= 1952–53 Blackpool F.C. season =

English football club season

Blackpool F.C.
1952–53 season
- Manager: Joe Smith
- First Division: 7th
- FA Cup: Winners
- Top goalscorer: League: Stan Mortensen & Allan Brown (15); All: Stan Mortensen (18)
- Highest home attendance: 36,159 vs Preston North End, First Division, 25 August 1952
- Lowest home attendance: 13,284 vs Stoke City, First Division. 15 April 1953
- Average home league attendance: 25,835
Home colours

The 1952–53 season was Blackpool F.C.'s 45th season (42nd consecutive) in the Football League. They competed in the 22-team Division One, then the top tier of English football, finishing seventh.

They were also the winners of the FA Cup, the only time they have done so to date, beating Bolton Wanderers 4–3 in the final. Although it subsequently became known as "The Matthews Final", Stan Mortensen, Blackpool's top scorer in all competitions that season, scored a hat-trick in the match. It remained the only such feat achieved in an FA Cup Final held at the original Wembley Stadium.

Stan Mortensen was the club's top scorer for the ninth consecutive season, with eighteen goals in all competitions. He shared the accolade in the league with Allan Brown. The two scored fifteen goals apiece.

== First-team squad ==
Name	Position(s)	Nationality	Place of birth	Date of birth	Apps	Goals	Signed from	Date signed	Fee
Goalkeepers
George Farm	GK	(Scotland)	Slateford	13 June 1924 (aged 27)	177	0	(Scotland) Hibernian	September 1948	Free transfer
Willie Hall	GK	(England)	Walton-le-Dale	6 February 1926 (aged 26)	0	0	(England) Preston North End	July 1949	
Harry Sharratt	GK	(England)	Wigan	16 December 1929 (aged 22)	0	0	(England) Wigan Athletic	May 1952	
Full-backs
John Crosland	FB	(England)	Lytham St Annes	10 November 1922 (aged 29)	38	0	(England) Ansdell Rovers	May 1946	
David Frith	FB	(England)	Liverpool	17 March 1929 (aged 23)	0	0	Apprentice	May 1949	
Tommy Garrett	LB	(England)	South Shields	28 February 1926 (aged 26)	114	0	(England) Horden Colliery Welfare	October 1944	
Roy Gratrix	FB	(England)	Salford	9 February 1932 (aged 20)	0	0	(England) Taylor Brothers	March 1953	
Dai Powell	LB	(Wales)	Swansea	19 January 1935 (aged 17)	0	0	Apprentice	December 1952	
Eddie Shimwell	RB	(England)	Birchover	27 February 1920 (aged 32)	219	7	(England) Sheffield United	20 December 1946	£7,000
Jackie Wright	FB	(England)	Atherton	11 August 1926 (aged 25)	54	0	(England) Mossley	June 1946	
Half-backs
Jack Ainscough	CH	(England)	Adlington	26 March 1926 (aged 26)	2	0	(England) Astley Bridge	August 1949	
Ewan Fenton	RH	(Scotland)	Dundee	17 November 1929 (aged 22)	34	1	(Scotland) Lochee Harp	November 1946	
Stan Hepton	WH	(England)	Leeds	3 December 1932 (aged 19)	0	0	(England) Ashley Road Methodists	March 1950	
Harry Johnston	CH/LH/RH	(England)	Manchester	26 September 1919 (aged 32)	297	11	(England) Droylsden	October 1936	Free transfer
Hughie Kelly	LH	(Scotland)	Valleyfield	23 July 1923 (aged 28)	167	3	(Scotland) Jeanfield Swifts	August 1944	
Cyril Robinson	LH	(England)	Bulwell	4 March 1929 (aged 23)	11	2	(England) Mansfield Town	September 1949	
Forwards
Allan Brown	IF	(Scotland)	Kennoway	12 October 1926 (aged 25)	61	19	(Scotland) East Fife	December 1950	£26,500
Dave Durie	IF	(England)	Blackpool	13 August 1931 (aged 20)	0	0	(England) Oxford Amateurs	May 1952	
Sandy Harris	OR	(Scotland)	Hong Kong	22 October 1934 (aged 17)	0	0	(Scotland) Scone	November 1951	
Albert Hobson	OR	(England)	Glossop	7 April 1925 (aged 27)	42	1	(England) Glossop	August 1945	
Stanley Matthews	OR	(England)	Stoke-on-Trent	1 February 1915 (aged 37)	164	5	(England) Stoke City	10 May 1947	£11,500
George McKnight	IF	(Northern Ireland)	Newtownards	17 November 1923 (aged 28)	41	10	(Northern Ireland) Coleraine	June 1946	
Stan Mortensen	CF	(England)	South Shields	26 May 1921 (aged 31)	242	170	(England) South Shields ex-schoolboys	May 1938	
Jackie Mudie	IF	(Scotland)	Dundee	10 April 1930 (aged 22)	61	25	(Scotland) Lochee Harp	May 1947	
Bill Perry	OL	(England)	Johannesburg	10 September 1930 (aged 21)	98	10	(Union of South Africa) Johannesburg Rangers	November 1949	
Alan Withers	OL	(England)	Bulwell	20 October 1930 (aged 21)	14	6	(England) Aspley Boys Club	4 July 1949	
Graham Williams	OF	(Wales)	Wrexham	31 December 1936 (aged 15)	0	0	(England) Wolverhampton Wanderers		
Billy Wright	OL	(England)	Blackpool	4 March 1931 (aged 21)	5	1	Apprentice	May 1950	
Len Stephenson	CF	(England)	Blackpool	14 July 1930 (aged 21)	4	1	(England) Highfield Youth Club	November 1948	
Ernie Taylor	IF	(England)	Sunderland	2 September 1925 (aged 26)	31	5	(England) Newcastle United	10 October 1951	£25,000

== Competitions ==
=== Overall record ===
Competition	First match	Last match	Starting round	Final position	Record							
Competition	First match	Last match	Starting round	Final position	Pld	W	D	L	GF	GA	GD	Win %
First Division	23 August 1952	25 April 1953	Matchday 1	7th	42	19	9	14	71	70	+1	45.24
FA Cup	10 January 1953	2 May 1953	Third round	Winners	7	6	1	0	14	8	+6	85.71
Total					49	25	10	14	85	78	+7	51.02

Source: Competitions

=== Football League First Division ===
==== League table ====
Pos	Team	Pld	W	D	L	GF	GA	GAv	Pts
5	Charlton Athletic	42	19	11	12	77	63	1.222	49
6	Burnley	42	18	12	12	67	52	1.288	48
7	Blackpool	42	19	9	14	71	70	1.014	47
8	Manchester United	42	18	10	14	69	72	0.958	46
9	Sunderland	42	15	13	14	68	82	0.829	43

Source: World Football
Rules for classification: 1) Points; 2) Goal average; 3) Goals scored

==== Results ====
===== In summary =====
Overall								Home						Away					
Pld	W	D	L	GF	GA	GAv	Pts	W	D	L	GF	GA	Pts	W	D	L	GF	GA	Pts
42	19	9	14	71	70	1.014	47	13	5	3	45	22	31	6	4	11	26	48	16

===== By matchday =====
Matchday	1	2	3	4	5	6	7	8	9	10	11	12	13	14	15	16	17	18	19	20	21	22	23	24	25	26	27	28	29	30	31	32	33	34	35	36	37	38	39	40	41	42
Ground	A	H	H	A	A	H	H	A	H	A	H	A	H	A	H	A	H	A	H	A	H	H	A	A	A	H	A	H	H	A	A	H	A	H	A	H	H	A	A	H	H	A
Result	W	D	W	W	L	W	W	W	W	L	W	L	L	D	L	W	D	D	W	L	W	D	L	L	L	D	D	W	W	L	W	W	L	L	W	W	W	D	L	D	W	L
Position	1	2	1	3	6	4	3	2	1	3	2	2	3	4	6	5	6	6	4	5	4	4	5	7	8	9	10	8	7	8	7	7	7	7	7	7	6	5	7	5	4	7

Source: 11v11
A = Away; H = Home; W = Win; D = Draw; L = Loss

===== In detail =====
23 August 1952 1	Portsmouth	0–2	Blackpool	Portsmouth
			Brown 4'; Mortensen 49'	Stadium: Fratton Park; Attendance: 43,478; Referee: R.J. Leafe

25 August 1952 2	Blackpool	1–1	Preston North End	Blackpool
	Mortensen		Wayman 37'	Stadium: Bloomfield Road; Attendance: 36,159; Referee: C. Fletcher

30 August 1952 3	Blackpool	3–0	Bolton Wanderers	Blackpool
	Taylor; Matthews; Barrass (o.g.)			Stadium: Bloomfield Road; Attendance: 31,317; Referee: F. Thurman

6 September 1952 4	Aston Villa	1–5	Blackpool	Aston
	Dixon		Taylor; Mortensen; Brown	Stadium: Villa Park; Attendance: 52,688; Referee: A.E. Ellis

10 September 1952 5	Chelsea	4–0	Blackpool	Fulham
	Bentley 5'; Gray 11'; McNichol 69', 90'			Stadium: Stamford Bridge; Attendance: 47,632; Referee: F.L. Overton

13 September 1952 6	Blackpool	2–0	Sunderland	Blackpool
	Mortensen; Perry			Stadium: Bloomfield Road; Attendance: 35,350; Referee: A.W. Luty

15 September 1952 7	Blackpool	3–1	Chelsea	Blackpool
	Perry; Mortensen; Matthews		Bentley 4'	Stadium: Bloomfield Road; Attendance: 28,892; Referee: F.L. Overton

20 September 1952 8	Wolverhampton Wanderers	2–5	Blackpool	Wolverhampton
	Flowers 42'; Swinbourne 64'		Mortensen 28'; Matthews 34'; Perry 49'; Taylor 68'; Brown 80'	Stadium: Molineux; Attendance: 48,598; Referee: C. Fletcher

27 September 1952 9	Blackpool	8–4	Charlton Athletic	Blackpool
	Hammond 6' (o.g.); Brown 7', 43', 44'; Mortensen 26'; Garrett 46'; Matthews 63'; Taylor 65'		Evans 29', 70'; Lock 75' (pen.); Vaughan 82'	Stadium: Bloomfield Road; Attendance: 33,498; Referee: C.W. Bucknall

4 October 1952 10	Arsenal	3–1	Blackpool	Highbury
	Logie; Roper		Taylor 20'	Stadium: Highbury; Attendance: 66,642; Referee: J.R. Dunbar

11 October 1952 11	Blackpool	4–2	Burnley	Blackpool
	Mortensen 33'; Perry 60', 70'; Brown 82' (pen.)		Elliott 62' (pen.); Shannon 72'	Stadium: Bloomfield Road; Attendance: 35,671; Referee: G. Black

18 October 1952 12	Tottenham Hotspur	4–0	Blackpool	Tottenham
	Ramsey (pen.); Duquemin; Baily			Stadium: White Hart Lane; Attendance: 53,928; Referee: P.F. Power

25 October 1952 13	Blackpool	0–1	Sheffield Wednesday	Blackpool
			Woodhead	Stadium: Bloomfield Road; Attendance: 28,162; Referee: T.W. Glendenning

1 November 1952 14	Cardiff City	2–2	Blackpool	Cardiff
	Northcott; Chisholm		Taylor; Hobson	Stadium: Ninian Park; Attendance: 43,662; Referee: H. Ball

8 November 1952 15	Blackpool	0–2	Newcastle United	Blackpool
			Robledo; Brander	Stadium: Bloomfield Road; Attendance: 26,362; Referee: T. Seymour

15 November 1952 16	West Bromwich Albion	0–1	Blackpool	West Bromwich
			Mortensen	Stadium: The Hawthorns; Attendance: 33,712; Referee: L.N. Peake

22 November 1952 17	Blackpool	1–1	Middlesbrough	Blackpool
	Brown 7'		Norris 9'	Stadium: Bloomfield Road; Attendance: 19,934; Referee: A. Wilkinson

29 November 1952 18	Liverpool	2–2	Blackpool	Liverpool
	Payne		Perry; Taylor	Stadium: Anfield; Attendance: 32,336; Referee: H. Jackson

6 December 1952 19	Blackpool	4–1	Manchester City	Blackpool
	Brown; Mortensen; Taylor		Williamson	Stadium: Bloomfield Road; Attendance: 19,496; Referee: R.P. Hartley

13 December 1952 20	Stoke City	4–0	Blackpool	Stoke-on-Trent
	Mountford; Oscroft; Fenton (o.g.)			Stadium: Victoria Ground; Attendance: 19,118; Referee: B.J. Flanagan

20 December 1952 21	Blackpool	3–2	Portsmouth	Blackpool
	Fenton; Perry; Taylor		Harris 37'; Froggatt 88'	Stadium: Bloomfield Road; Attendance: 13,562; Referee: R.J. Leafe

25 December 1952 22	Blackpool	0–0	Manchester United	Blackpool
				Stadium: Bloomfield Road; Attendance: 27,778; Referee: W.H.E. Evans

26 December 1952 23	Manchester United	2–1	Blackpool	Manchester
	Carey 40'; Lewis 80'		Mortensen 10'	Stadium: Old Trafford; Attendance: 49,934; Referee: W.H.E. Evans

1 January 1953 24	Preston North End	4–2	Blackpool	Preston
	Wayman; Morrison; Finney		Hobson; Perry	Stadium: Deepdale; Attendance: 30,696; Referee: C. Fletcher

3 January 1953 25	Bolton Wanderers	4–0	Blackpool	Bolton
	Wheeler; Moir			Stadium: Burnden Park; Attendance: 36,572; Referee: F. Thurman

17 January 1953 26	Blackpool	1–1	Aston Villa	Blackpool
	Mudie		Gibson	Stadium: Bloomfield Road; Attendance: 21,258; Referee: A.E. Ellis

24 January 1953 27	Sunderland	1–1	Blackpool	Sunderland
	Wright		Hepton	Stadium: Roker Park; Attendance: 53,653; Referee: A.W. Luty

7 February 1953 28	Blackpool	2–0	Wolverhampton Wanderers	Blackpool
	Brown 4', 84'			Stadium: Bloomfield Road; Attendance: 21,702; Referee: C. Fletcher

21 February 1953 29	Blackpool	3–2	Arsenal	Blackpool
	Mudie 20', 27'; Brown 85'		Mercer 54'; Goring 77'	Stadium: Bloomfield Road; Attendance: 30,034; Referee: J.R. Dunbar

23 February 1953 30	Charlton Athletic	2–0	Blackpool	Charlton
	Firmani 7'; Kiernan 31'		Hepton	Stadium: The Valley; Attendance: 15,913; Referee: C.W. Bucknall

3 March 1953 31	Burnley	0–1	Blackpool	Burnley
			Perry 65'	Stadium: Turf Moor; Attendance: 20,874; Referee: G. Black

7 March 1953 32	Blackpool	2–0	Tottenham Hotspur	Blackpool
	Mudie; Perry			Stadium: Bloomfield Road; Attendance: 26,796; Referee: P.F. Power

14 March 1953 33	Sheffield Wednesday	2–0	Blackpool	Sheffield
	Marriott; Sewell		Perry 65'	Stadium: Hillsborough Stadium; Attendance: 40,961; Referee: T.W. Glendenning

25 March 1953 34	Blackpool	0–1	Cardiff City	Blackpool
			Northcott	Stadium: Bloomfield Road; Attendance: 15,227; Referee: H. Ball

28 March 1953 35	Newcastle United	0–1	Blackpool	Newcastle upon Tyne
			Taylor	Stadium: St James' Park; Attendance: 41,205; Referee: T. Seymour

3 April 1953 36	Blackpool	2–1	Derby County	Blackpool
	Taylor; Mortensen		McLaren	Stadium: Bloomfield Road; Attendance: 27,382; Referee: E. Plinston

4 April 1953 37	Blackpool	2–0	West Bromwich Albion	Blackpool
	Mortensen			Stadium: Bloomfield Road; Attendance: 30,592; Referee: L.N. Peake

6 April 1953 38	Derby County	1–1	Blackpool	Derby
	Lee		Mortensen	Stadium: The Baseball Ground; Attendance: 24,795; Referee: E. Plinston

11 April 1953 39	Middlesbrough	1–1	Blackpool	Middlesbrough
	Mannion 14'; Fitzsimons 32', 43'; Spuhler 36', 79'		Durie 11'	Stadium: Ayresome Park; Attendance: 38,847; Referee: A. Wilkinson

15 April 1953 40	Blackpool	1–1	Stoke City	Blackpool
	Perry		Mountford	Stadium: Bloomfield Road; Attendance: 13,284; Referee: B.J. Flanagan

18 April 1953 41	Blackpool	3–1	Liverpool	Blackpool
	Garrett; Perry; Mudie		Smyth	Stadium: Bloomfield Road; Attendance: 20,073; Referee: G. Gibson

25 April 1953 42	Manchester City	5–0	Blackpool	Manchester
	Cuncliffe; McCourt; Spurdle; Williamson			Stadium: Maine Road; Attendance: 35,507; Referee: R.P. Hartley

=== FA Cup ===
10 January 1953 Third round	Sheffield Wednesday	1–2	Blackpool	Sheffield
	Sewell 75'		Matthews; Taylor	Stadium: Hillsborough Stadium; Attendance: 60,199; Referee: H. Jackson

31 January 1953 Fourth round	Blackpool	1–0	Huddersfield Town	Blackpool
	Garrett			Stadium: Bloomfield Road; Attendance: 29,293; Referee: B.M. Griffiths

14 February 1953 Fifth round	Blackpool	1–1	Southampton	Blackpool
	Perry		Horton	Stadium: Bloomfield Road; Attendance: 27,543; Referee: B.J. Flanagan

18 February 1953 Fifth round replay	Southampton	1–2	Blackpool	Southampton
	Walker		Horton 47' (o.g.); Brown 49'	Stadium: The Dell; Attendance: 29,223; Referee: B.J. Flanagan

28 February 1953 Sixth round	Arsenal	1–2	Blackpool	London
	Logie		Brown; Taylor	Stadium: Highbury Stadium; Attendance: 69,158; Referee: A.W. Luty

21 March 1953 Semi-final	Blackpool	2–1	Tottenham Hotspur	Aston
	Perry 8'; Mudie 89'		Duquemin 50'	Stadium: Villa Park; Attendance: 68,221; Referee: A.E. Ellis

2 May 1953 Final	Blackpool	4–3	Bolton Wanderers	Wembley
15:00 BST	Mortensen 35', 68', 89'; Perry 90+2'		Lofthouse 2'; Moir 40'; Bell 55'	Stadium: Wembley Stadium; Attendance: 100,000; Referee: B.M. Griffiths

== Squad statistics ==
=== Appearances and goals ===
Pos.	Nat.	Name	First Division		FA Cup		Total	
Pos.	Nat.	Name	Apps	Goals	Apps	Goals	Apps	Goals
GK	(Scotland)	George Farm	38	0	7	0	45	0
GK	(England)	Willie Hall	3	0	0	0	3	0
GK	(England)	Harry Sharratt	1	0	0	0	1	0
DF	(England)	John Crosland	25	0	3	0	28	0
DF	(England)	David Frith	10	0	0	0	10	0
DF	(England)	Tommy Garrett	38	2	7	1	40	3
DF	(England)	Roy Gratrix	0	0	0	0	0	0
DF	(Wales)	Dai Powell	0	0	0	0	0	0
DF	(England)	Eddie Shimwell	35	0	7	0	42	0
DF	(England)	Jackie Wright	0	0	0	0	0	0
MF	(England)	Jack Ainscough	4	0	0	0	4	0
MF	(Scotland)	Ewan Fenton	28	1	6	0	34	1
MF	(England)	Stan Hepton	1	1	0	0	1	1
MF	(England)	Harry Johnston	36	0	7	0	43	0
MF	(Scotland)	Hughie Kelly	31	0	3	0	34	0
MF	(England)	Cyril Robinson	2	0	1	0	3	0
FW	(Scotland)	Allan Brown	26	15	5	2	31	17
FW	(England)	Dave Durie	8	1	0	0	8	1
FW	(Scotland)	Sandy Harris	2	0	0	0	2	0
FW	(England)	Albert Hobson	17	2	0	0	17	2
FW	(England)	Stanley Matthews	20	4	7	1	27	5
FW	(Northern Ireland)	George McKnight	2	0	1	0	3	0
FW	(England)	Stan Mortensen	34	15	2	3	36	18
FW	(Scotland)	Jackie Mudie	20	5	7	1	27	6
FW	(England)	Bill Perry	36	12	7	3	43	15
FW	(England)	Alan Withers	0	0	0	0	0	0
FW	(Wales)	Graham Williams	0	0	0	0	0	0
FW	(England)	Billy Wright	7	0	0	0	7	0
FW	(England)	Len Stephenson	0	0	0	0	0	0
FW	(England)	Ernie Taylor	38	11	7	2	45	13
Players used:		24						
Goals scored:		85 (including 3 own goals)						

=== Goalscorers ===
Rank	Pos.	Player	First Division	FA Cup	Total
1	FW	(England) Stan Mortensen	15	3	18
2	FW	(Scotland) Allan Brown	15	2	17
3	FW	(England) Bill Perry	12	3	15
4	FW	(England) Ernie Taylor	11	2	13
5	FW	(Scotland) Jackie Mudie	5	1	6
6	FW	(England) Stanley Matthews	4	1	5
7	DF	(England) Tommy Garrett	2	1	3
8	FW	(England) Albert Hobson	2	0	2
9	MF	(Scotland) Ewan Fenton	1	0	1
9	MF	(England) Stan Hepton	1	0	1
9	FW	(England) Dave Durie	1	0	1
Own Goals			2	1	3
Total			71	14	85

=== Clean sheets ===
Rank	Pos.	Player	First Division	FA Cup	Total
1	GK	(Scotland) George Farm	10	1	11

== Transfers ==
=== Transfers in ===
Date	Pos.	Nat.	Name	From	Fee
May 1952	GK	(England)	Harry Sharratt	Wigan Athletic	—
May 1952	IF	(England)	Dave Durie	Oxford Amateurs	—
December 1952	LB	(Wales)	Dai Powell	Free agency	—
March 1953	FB	(England)	Roy Gratrix	Taylor Brothers	—
	OF	(Wales)	Graham Williams	Wolverhampton Wanderers	—

=== Transfers out ===
Date	Pos.	Nat.	Name	To	Fee
May 1952	CH	(England)	Eric Hayward	Retired	—
