= Hughie Kelly =

Scottish footballer and manager

Personal information
- Full name: Hugh Thomas Kelly
- Date of birth: 23 July 1923
- Place of birth: Valleyfield, Fife, Scotland
- Date of death: 28 March 2009 (aged 85)
- Place of death: Lytham St Annes, England
- Position: Left half

Youth career
- 19??–1943: Jeanfield Swifts

Senior career*
Years	Team	Apps	(Gls)
1943–1960	Blackpool	428	(8)

International career
195?	Scotland B	2	(0)
1952	Scotland	1	(0)

Managerial career
- 1961–1963: Ashton United (player-manager)
- * Club domestic league appearances and goals

Hugh Thomas Kelly (23 July 1923 – 28 March 2009) was a Scottish professional football player and manager. He played as a left half and spent his entire 14-year professional career with Blackpool.

== Club career ==
Born in Valleyfield, Fife, Kelly began his career with Perth-based junior club Jeanfield Swifts. He joined English club Blackpool in 1943 as a 20-year-old, but due to the ongoing World War II, he didn't make his League debut for the Seasiders until September 1946. During the war, he guested for several clubs, including East Fife.

It took some time for Kelly to establish himself in Blackpool's half-back line, but by 1948–49, the trio of Harry Johnston, Eric Hayward and Kelly was becoming legendary. He played in both the 1948 and 1951 FA Cup Finals. However, in the final home league game of the 1952–53 season against Liverpool he suffered a broken ankle following a tackle by centre-forward Louis Bimpson and he missed the famous 1953 match-up with Bolton Wanderers, although the club asked the Football Association to produce a special winners' medal for his nomination as "twelfth man". Kelly later said, "I lived a great journey to Wembley. That's what fascinated me. And it was a privilege to know such a good crowd of players. They were lovely. Even though we'd lost the other two, it was great to have played on the sacred turf at Wembley and I have fond memories."

The 1950s was the most successful decade in Blackpool's history to date, and Kelly was at the club playing top division football throughout, as were goalkeeper George Farm, defender Tommy Garrett, right winger Stanley Matthews, forward Jackie Mudie and outside left Bill Perry.

In 1955–56 he took over as Blackpool skipper from Johnston and helped the club to their highest-ever league finish, runners-up to Manchester United. He remained club captain until his retirement from the professional game in 1960. At the end of 1959–60 he was given a free transfer, and Lancashire Combination side Ashton United came in for his services as their player-manager.

== International career ==
Kelly won one cap for Scotland, in a 6–0 victory over the United States on 30 April 1952. He also appeared twice for Scotland B.

== Personal life ==
Kelly was married in 1949 and had three daughters. After retiring, he remained in Blackpool and was later on the backroom staff at Bloomfield Road. He also started a business in the North Shore area of the town as a grocer and ice-cream manufacturer. After a short illness in 2008, Kelly underwent an emergency operation in Victoria Hospital on 14 February 2009. He then contracted pneumonia and died in Clifton Hospital in Lytham St Annes on 28 March. His funeral was held at Sacred Heart Roman Catholic Church, Blackpool, and he was cremated at Carleton Crematorium.

== Career statistics ==
=== Club statistics ===
Appearances and goals by club, season and competition
Club	Season	League			FA Cup		Other		Total	
Club	Season	Division	Apps	Goals	Apps	Goals	Apps	Goals	Apps	Goals
Blackpool	1945–46	—	—		1	0	0	0	1	0
Blackpool	1946–47	First Division	6	0	0	0	0	0	6	0
Blackpool	1947–48	First Division	24	0	6	0	0	0	30	0
Blackpool	1948–49	First Division	38	2	3	0	0	0	41	2
Blackpool	1949–50	First Division	40	0	5	0	0	0	45	0
Blackpool	1950–51	First Division	37	1	7	0	0	0	44	1
Blackpool	1952–53	First Division	31	0	3	0	0	0	34	0
Blackpool	1953–54	First Division	36	0	6	0	1 (Note: Appearance in the FA Charity Shield)	0	43	0
Blackpool	1954–55	First Division	35	0	1	0	0	0	36	0
Blackpool	1955–56	First Division	41	0	1	0	0	0	42	0
Blackpool	1956–57	First Division	18	0	0	0	0	0	18	0
Blackpool	1957–58	First Division	36	3	1	1	0	0	37	4
Blackpool	1958–59	First Division	36	2	6	0	0	0	42	2
Blackpool	1959–60	First Division	18	0	2	0	0	0	20	0
Career total			429	8	42	1	1	0	472	9

=== International statistics ===
Appearances and goals by national team and year
National team	Year	Apps	Goals
Scotland	1952	1	0
Total		1	0

== Honours ==
Blackpool

- FA Cup runner-up: 1947–48, 1950–51
