= Joe Smith (football forward, born 1889) =

English footballer and manager

Personal information
- Full name: Joseph Smith
- Date of birth: 25 June 1889
- Place of birth: Dudley, England
- Date of death: 11 August 1971 (aged 82)
- Place of death: Blackpool, England
- Height: 5 ft 7 1/4 in (1.71 m)
- Position: Inside left

Youth career
- 1904–1908: Newcastle Parish Schools

Senior career*
Years	Team	Apps	(Gls)
1908–1927	Bolton Wanderers	449	(254)
1927–1929	Stockport County	70	(61)
1929–1931	Darwen (player-manager)	51	(42)
Total		570	(357)

International career
1913–1920	England	5	(1)

Managerial career
- 1929–1931: Darwen (player-manager)
- 1931–1935: Reading
- 1935–1958: Blackpool
- * Club domestic league appearances and goals

Joseph Smith (25 June 1889 – 11 August 1971) was an English professional football player and manager. He is eleventh on the list of England's top-flight goal scorers, scoring 243 league goals. He was manager of Blackpool for 23 years and guided them to victory in the 1953 FA Cup final, the only time they have won the competition since their 1887 inception.

A forward, he began his career at Crewe Alexandra but did not play a first-team game for the club. He instead made his name at Bolton Wanderers, where with 277 league and cup goals between 1908 and 1927, he is the club's second highest goalscorer, only eight behind Nat Lofthouse. He won the Second Division title with Bolton 1908–09, and played in FA Cup final victories in 1923 and 1926. He later hit 61 goals in 70 league games for Stockport County, before being appointed player-manager at Darwen in 1929. Two years later, he was appointed manager of Reading and narrowly missed out on promotion during his four seasons in charge. He became Blackpool manager in August 1935 and remained in this position until April 1958. He led the "Seasiders" to one victory in three FA Cup final appearances (1948, 1951, and 1953), and also led the club to runners-up spot in the Second Division in 1936–37, second place in the First Division in 1955–56, and runners-up in the 1953 FA Charity Shield.

== Early and personal life ==
Joseph Smith was born in 1889, with the birth registered in Dudley, and the family moved to Newcastle-under-Lyme when he was three months old. His father, also named Joseph, was an iron puddler, and his mother was named Rosina. He was the youngest of three sons, and one brother, Philip, played professional football and was killed during the First World War. He married Priscilla (Cissie) Bond on 7 June 1921, at Manchester Cathedral.

== Club career ==
=== Bolton Wanderers ===
Smith began his junior career at the age of 15 with Newcastle Parish Schools Association in the North Staffordshire Sunday School League. Both Stoke and Crewe Alexandra showed an interest in him, before he signed with Bolton Wanderers for a £10 transfer fee in 1908. Wanderers won the Second Division title in 1908–09, but were immediately relegated out of the First Division in 1909–10. They regained their top-flight status after securing a second-place finish in the Second Division in 1910–11. Smith then became the club's top-scorer in 1911–12 with 24 goals, as Bolton posted a fourth-place finish, six points behind champions Blackburn Rovers. He scored 22 goals in 1912–13, as Bolton dropped to eighth position. George Lillycrop then became the club's leading scorer in 1913–14, before Smith finished as the club's top-scorer for the third time in four seasons with 36 goals in 1914–15. During the First World War he guested for Chelsea and Port Vale.

After the war, Bolton finished sixth in 1919–20. With the help of "Trotters" teammate Ted Vizard, during the 1920–21 season Smith scored a club record 38 goals, which put him top of the First Division goalscoring chart for that season; the club recorded a third-place finish. However, Bolton dropped to sixth position again in 1921–22. Smith recorded 19 goals in 1922–23 to become the club's top-scorer for the fifth time. His goals helped Bolton to reach the 1923 FA Cup final – the first FA Cup final to be held at Wembley. Smith captained Bolton to a 2–0 victory over West Ham United. David Jack then took the mantle as the club's main source of goals in 1923–24 and 1924–25, as Bolton posted two top-four finishes in succession. Smith scored 21 goals in 1925–26 to finish as the club's top-scorer for the sixth and final time. He also captained the club to another FA Cup final victory, as a goal from namesake Jack Smith was enough to beat Manchester City 1–0. The 1926–27 season was then his last at the club, as he led Bolton to fourth in the league, eight points behind leaders Newcastle United. In his 19 years with Bolton, Smith scored 277 goals in 492 games (his league record being 254 goals in 449 appearances).

=== Later career ===
On 16 March 1927, Smith signed for Stockport County for a fee of £1,000. However, an administration error meant that County were deducted two points and fined £125. He went on to score 61 goals in 70 league games at Edgeley Park. With 38 Third Division North goals in 1927–28, he was the division's top-scorer that season, though the "Hatters" could only manage a third-place finish. County then finished second in 1928–29, just one point behind champions Bradford City.

Upon leaving County, Smith joined Manchester Central on 22 June 1929, reuniting with his old Bolton teammate, Frank Roberts. In 1930, aged 41, and without a club for the 1930–31 season, rumours regarding Smith's retirement arose, but they were abated when he signed on for Darwen, also in the Lancashire Combination, on 8 September 1930, being appointed as club captain. Darwen had hoped to have him for another year, but Smith went on to end his career with Hyde United.

== International career ==
The first of Smith's five England caps came on 15 February 1913, in a 2–1 defeat to Ireland at Belfast's Windsor Park in the Home Championship. He then scored the opening goal of a 2–0 win over Wales at Ninian Park on 16 March 1914. He then played England's next three games either side of World War I: a 3–1 defeat to Scotland at Hampden Park (14 April 1914), a 1–1 draw with Ireland at Windsor Park (25 October 1919), and a 2–1 defeat to Wales at Highbury (15 March 1920).

== Managerial career ==
=== Darwen ===
In 1929, Smith became player-manager of Darwen. As a player, he scored 42 goals in 51 games. As manager, he guided them to wins in the Lancashire Combination Championship (twice), the Combination Cup (twice), the Lancashire Junior Cup, and the Lancashire Challenge Trophy.

=== Reading ===
Upon hanging up his playing boots in 1931, Smith became manager of Reading. In each of his four seasons at Elm Park, he took the club to within a few places of promotion out of the Third Division South. He led the "Biscuitmen" as they were then known to a second-place finish in 1931–32 – two points behind champions Fulham, a fourth-place finish in 1932–33 – 11 points behind leaders Brentford, third in 1933–34 – seven points short of Norwich City, and second in 1934–35 – eight points behind promoted Charlton Athletic.

His success was due mostly to his phenomenal home record. In 84 matches at Elm Park, he won 66 and lost only 3, scoring an average of three goals per game and steering the club on a 55-game unbeaten home run that lasted from April 1933 until after he left in 1935.

=== Blackpool ===
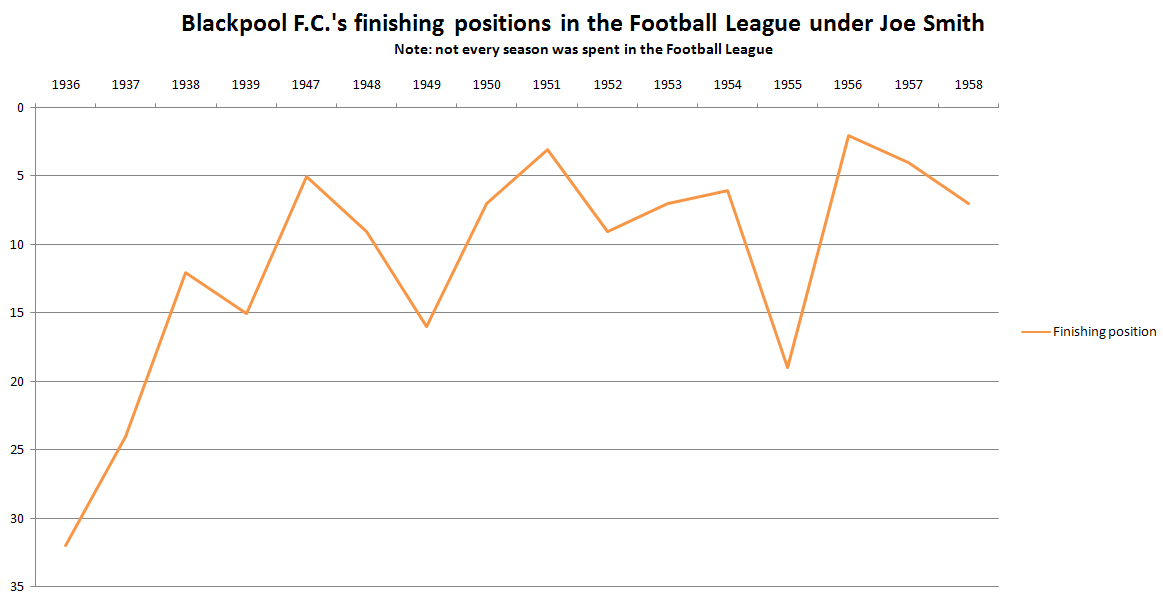
Blackpool's finishing positions in the Football League under Smith.

In August 1935, Smith was approached to become the new manager of Blackpool, in place of the departed Sandy MacFarlane, an offer he immediately accepted; a love of the seaside being one of the main deciding factors. After a tenth-place finish in 1935–36, he led the club to promotion in 1936–37 with a second-place finish in the Second Division. He then secured the club's First Division status with mid-table finishes in 1937–38 and 1938–39. On 10 March 1939, Smith and club director Albert Hindley made the football headlines when they completed the £10,000 record signing of Jock Dodds from Sheffield United. However, World War II ensured that Smith's big signing barely featured in the Football League, though he went on to score well over 200 goals at Bloomfield Road during the war.

After the war, Smith built a formidable "M" forward line of Stan Mortensen, Stanley Matthews and Jackie Mudie. Mortensen and Mudie began their professional careers at the club, whilst Smith signed Matthews from Stoke City for an £11,500 fee in May 1947. Other key signings Smith made during his time at the club include: defender Danny Blair (joined from Aston Villa in 1936), George Farrow (defender signed from Bournemouth & Boscombe Athletic for £1,250 in 1936), Scotland winger Alex Munro (signed from Hearts in March 1937 for £3,500), inside-forward Willie Buchan (signed from Celtic for £10,000), defender Eric Hayward (free signing from Port Vale in May 1937), Eddie Shimwell (signed from Sheffield United for £7,000 in December 1946), full-back Jackie Wright (signed from Mossley), goalkeeper George Farm (joined on a free transfer from Hibernian), midfielder Allan Brown (signed from East Fife in December 1950), forward Ernie Taylor (signed from Newcastle United for £25,000 in October 1951), defender Jimmy Kelly (signed from Watford in October 1954 for £15,000), and striker Ray Charnley (signed from Morecambe for a £750 fee in May 1957). Many significant players also began their professional careers under Smith, including Barrie Martin, Ron Suart, Ewan Fenton, Tommy Garrett, Bill Perry, Dave Durie, Roy Gratrix, Brian Peterson, Hughie Kelly, and Jimmy Armfield. Though he was at Bloomfield Road before Smith, after the war, defender Harry Johnston went on to win caps for England whilst at Blackpool.

Blackpool finished fifth in the league in 1946–47, just seven points behind champions Liverpool. The next season, 1947–48, they reached the FA Cup final at Wembley, which ended in a 4–2 defeat to Manchester United. The "Seasiders" dropped to 16th place in 1948–49, but rose to seventh in 1949–50, just four points behind champions Portsmouth. Though they finished in third place in 1950–51, they ended the campaign ten points behind champions Tottenham Hotspur. Smith led the club to another FA Cup final in 1951, where they were beaten 2–0 by Newcastle United after a brace from Jackie Milburn. Blackpool could only finished ninth and seventh in 1951–52 and 1952–53, but reached another FA Cup final in 1953. Known as the "Matthews final", Stan Mortensen scored a hat-trick against Bolton Wanderers to secure Blackpool a 4–3 victory and their first-ever FA Cup title. The club finished sixth in the league in 1953–54 and then dropped down to 19th place in 1954–55. Smith then led the club to a record high league finish of second in 1955–56. However, they ended up with 11 points short of the champions, Manchester United. They finished fourth in 1956–57 and seventh in 1957–58. After 714 Football League games in charge of Blackpool, Smith resigned in 1958, at 68, due to poor health. The Blackpool board rewarded his services by giving him a hefty "golden handshake" and bought him a house in the town.

== Career statistics ==
=== Playing statistics ===
Appearances and goals by club, season and competition
Club	Season	League			FA Cup		Total	
Club	Season	Division	Apps	Goals	Apps	Goals	Apps	Goals
Bolton Wanderers	1908–09	Second Division	1	0	0	0	1	0
Bolton Wanderers	1909–10	First Division	6	0	0	0	6	0
Bolton Wanderers	1910–11	Second Division	32	11	1	0	33	11
Bolton Wanderers	1911–12	First Division	37	22	3	2	40	24
Bolton Wanderers	1912–13	First Division	33	22	1	0	34	22
Bolton Wanderers	1913–14	First Division	35	17	3	4	38	21
Bolton Wanderers	1914–15	First Division	38	29	7	3	45	32
Bolton Wanderers	1919–20	First Division	27	18	1	0	28	18
Bolton Wanderers	1920–21	First Division	41	38	1	0	42	38
Bolton Wanderers	1921–22	First Division	39	18	2	0	41	18
Bolton Wanderers	1922–23	First Division	37	17	7	2	44	19
Bolton Wanderers	1923–24	First Division	39	16	3	0	42	16
Bolton Wanderers	1924–25	First Division	36	24	3	2	39	26
Bolton Wanderers	1925–26	First Division	36	15	8	6	44	21
Bolton Wanderers	1926–27	First Division	12	7	3	0	15	7
Bolton Wanderers	Total		450	254	43	19	493	273
Stockport County	1926–27	Third Division North	8	4	0	0	8	4
Stockport County	1927–28	Third Division North	40	38	2	2	42	40
Stockport County	1928–29	Third Division North	22	19	1	0	23	19
Stockport County	Total		70	61	3	2	73	63
Career total			520	315	46	21	566	336

According to RSSSF, Smith scored over 616 career goals in 903 official matches, making him the highest goalscorer in football history at the end of the 1920s, with the next closest being Hungarian Imre Schlosser at +570 goals (1905–1928).

=== International statistics ===
Appearances and goals by national team and year
National team	Year	Apps	Goals
England	1913	1	0
England	1914	2	1
England	1919	1	0
England	1920	1	0
Total		5	1

=== Managerial statistics ===
Managerial record by team and tenure
Team	From	To	Record				
Team	From	To	G	W	D	L	Win %
Reading	1 July 1931	1 August 1935	184	92	43	49	50.00
Blackpool	1 August 1935	30 April 1958	688	299	157	232	43.46
Total			872	391	200	281	44.84

== Honours ==
=== As a player ===
Bolton Wanderers

- FA Cup: 1922–23, 1925–26
- Football League Second Division: 1908–09
- Football League Second Division second-place promotion: 1910–11

Darwen

- Lancashire Combination: 1930–31
- Lancashire Combination Cup: 1931
- East Lancashire Charity Shield: 1931

England

- British Home Championship: 1912–13

=== As a manager ===
Blackpool

- FA Cup: 1952–53; runner-up: 1947–48, 1950–51
- Football League Second Division second-place promotion: 1936–37

== Death ==
Smith died in 1971, aged 82.

== See also ==
- List of men's footballers with 500 or more goals
