= Jackie Wright (footballer) =

English footballer (1926–2005)

Personal information
- Full name: John Wright
- Date of birth: 11 August 1926
- Place of birth: Atherton, Lancashire, England
- Date of death: 22 June 2005 (aged 78)
- Place of death: Lancashire, England
- Position: Defender

Senior career*
Years	Team	Apps	(Gls)
1945–1946	Mossley	1	(0)
1948–1959	Blackpool	157	(1)

Managerial career
- 1969–1972: Tranmere Rovers
- * Club domestic league appearances and goals

John Wright (11 August 1926 – 22 June 2005) was an English professional footballer who played as a defender – specifically, a full back.

He spent eleven years with Blackpool in the 1940s and 1950s, making 157 league appearances and scoring one goal. He made his debut for Blackpool, who were then managed by Joe Smith, on 6 September 1948, in a 1–1 draw with Derby County at Bloomfield Road. He went on to make a further five appearances during the 1948–49 league campaign, deputising for Ron Suart.

Wright made fourteen league appearances in 1949–50, during which season Suart left for Blackburn Rovers.

In 1950–51, Wright made twelve league appearances, but sat out Blackpool's entire run to their second FA Cup Final.

The following season, 1951–52, he made fifteen appearances, before missing the whole 1952–53 term.

In 1953–54, Wright returned to the line-up; however, he was still unable to nudge out Tommy Garrett from the left-back berth, and therefore made only eight league appearances. Once again, he did not appear in the club's run to another, this time successful, FA Cup Final.

Wright was absent again for the entirety of the 1954–55 campaign, but it was in 1955–56, his eighth season with the Tangerines, that he was given an extended run in the team. He made thirty-eight starts in the club's 42 league games as they finished as runners-up in Division One.

He scored his first and only goal for the club in 1956–57, in a 4–0 victory over Luton Town at Bloomfield Road on 8 September, during one of his sixteen league appearances.

Wright had another sustained run in the Blackpool team during 1957–58, making 31 appearances.

1958–59 was Wright's eleventh and final season on the Fylde. Ron Suart, with whom he had competed for the number-3 shirt earlier in his Seasiders career, succeeded Joe Smith as manager. Suart gave seventeen starts to Wright, the final one occurring on 3 January in a 3–1 defeat at Manchester United at Old Trafford.

== Post-retirement ==
After retiring, Wright became a coach and then manager (from 1969 to 1972) at Tranmere Rovers.

Wright died in 2005.
