= 1953 FA Charity Shield =

- Event: FA Charity Shield
Arsenal	Blackpool
3	1
- Date: 12 October 1953
- Venue: Highbury, London
- Man of the Match: Stanley Matthews (Blackpool)
- Attendance: 39,853
- Weather: Misty, drizzly

The 1953 Football Association Charity Shield was the 29th FA Charity Shield, an annual football match played between the winners of the previous season's Football League First Division and FA Cup competitions. It was held at Highbury Stadium on 12 October 1953. The game was played between Arsenal, champions of the 1952–53 Football League and Blackpool, who had beaten Bolton Wanderers to win the 1953 FA Cup Final. This was Blackpool's first FA Charity Shield appearance to Arsenal's ninth.

In the match, Blackpool started strongly and scored first with Stan Mortensen's goal in the 30th minute. Against the run of play, however, Arsenal equalised through Tommy Lawton and in the second half they went ahead when Doug Lishman reacted first to a rebounded shot. Lishman scored his second of the match in the 80th minute, which sealed a seventh Charity Shield honour for Arsenal.

== Background ==
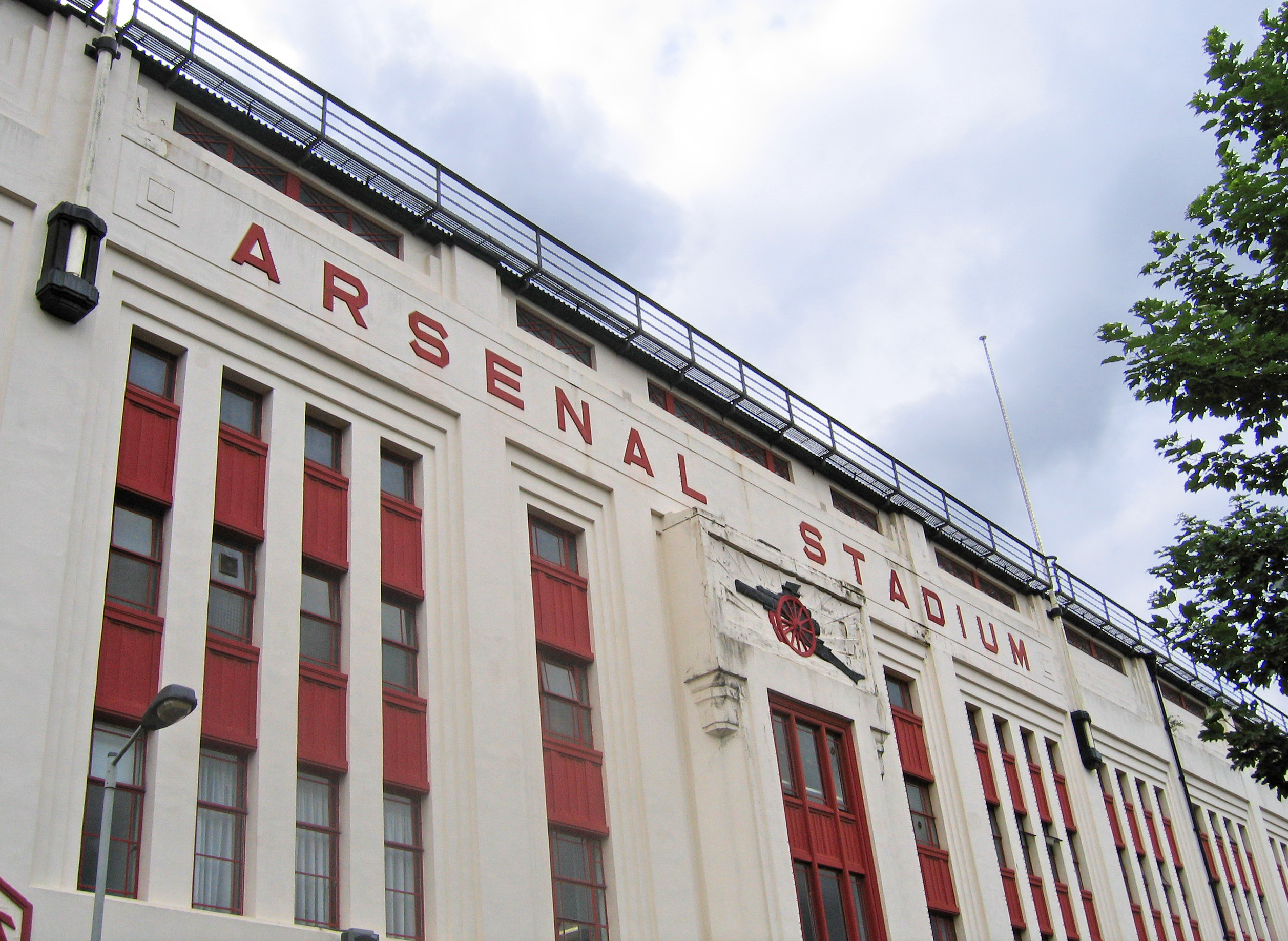
Highbury was the venue for the Charity Shield.

The FA Charity Shield was founded in 1908 as a successor to the Sheriff of London Charity Shield. It was a contest between the respective champions of the Football League and Southern League, and then by 1913 teams of amateur and professional players. In 1921, it was played by the Football League champions and FA Cup winners for the first time.

Arsenal qualified for the 1953 FA Charity Shield as champions of the 1952–53 Football League First Division. The other Charity Shield place went to Blackpool who won the 1952–53 FA Cup. The final of the competition, which pitted Blackpool against Bolton Wanderers, was best remembered for Stanley Matthews' performance, and later associated by his name. The 1953 Shield marked Blackpool's first appearance in the annual contest. By contrast, this was Arsenal's ninth Charity Shield appearance; prior to the game they had won six Shields (1930, 1931, 1933, 1934, 1938 and 1948), and lost two (1935 and 1936).

Arsenal announced their team two days before the match, recalling Cliff Holton who had recovered from injury. Blackpool refused to reveal their team until the evening of 12 October, but manager Joe Smith did confirm to the press that Matthews would start.

== Match ==
=== Summary ===
On a foggy, floodlit night at Highbury, it was the visitors who dominated the early proceedings; The Times football correspondent assessing that Blackpool's forward line had "...flowed sweetly, the ball on the ground in the most lovely [sic], sweeping movements." Matthews was at the heart of their best moves and, in particular, one pass through the Arsenal defence sent Bill Perry clear on goal. He tripped over the incoming Arsenal goalkeeper Jack Kelsey, but quickly managed to get up. With Kelsey out of his line, Perry was presented with the chance to score, but his shot hit the post. Blackpool continued to create chances and went ahead after 30 minutes of play. Breaking forward with the ball from the half-way line, Matthews combined with his team-mate Ernie Taylor, which culminated in Stan Mortensen getting the better of his marker and shooting past Kelsey.

Despite Blackpool's dominance, Arsenal managed to equalise seconds before half-time. From the left wing, Holton got the better of his opponent Eddie Shimwell by taking the ball off him, and proceeded to cross; the ball found Tommy Lawton who scored from the byline. Once play resumed in the second half, Blackpool struggled to reproduce the same kind of intensity that had merited their earlier lead. Arsenal dictated play the longer the match went on, and looked more assured in defence – The Times singled out Mercer’s growing influence, adding "...one noticed the improvement of [Bill] Dodgin at centre-half, and the high promise of young [Len] Wills, playing only his second game at right back."

Arsenal took the lead in the 65th minute when Jimmy Logie's pass was collected by Holton. His shot at goal rebounded into the path of Doug Lishman, who was following up, and he scored. Ten minutes before the end, a cross by Don Roper into Blackpool’s penalty area was headed down by Lawton; the ball reached Lishman who scored again to make sure of Arsenal's win.

The Shield was presented to Arsenal by Lord Alexander of Tunis, the Minister of Defence. Gate receipts for the match totalled £6,589. In his assessment of the game, The Manchester Guardian's football correspondent John Woodcock wrote: "The football was not the only thing that had been of a high order. The sportsmanship and spirit in which it was played had been in every way as fine." Arsenal ended the season 12th in the First Division, and reached the fourth round of the FA Cup. Blackpool finished six positions higher in the league, but progressed no further than the fifth round of the cup competition.

=== Details ===
12 October 1953
19:30 GMT

Arsenal	3–1	Blackpool
Lawton 45'; Lishman 65', 80'		Mortensen 30'

Highbury Stadium, London
Attendance: 39,853

GK	1	(Wales) Jack Kelsey
RB	2	(England) Len Wills
LB	3	(Wales) Walley Barnes
RH	4	(Scotland) Alex Forbes
CH	5	(England) Bill Dodgin
LH	6	(England) Joe Mercer (c)
OR	7	(England) Cliff Holton
IR	8	(Scotland) Jimmy Logie
CF	9	(England) Tommy Lawton
IL	10	(England) Doug Lishman
OL	11	(England) Don Roper
Manager:
(England) Tom Whittaker

GK	1	(Scotland) George Farm
RB	2	(England) Eddie Shimwell
LB	3	(England) Tommy Garrett
RH	4	(Scotland) Ewan Fenton
CH	5	(England) Harry Johnston (c)
LH	6	(England) Cyril Robinson
OR	7	(England) Stanley Matthews
IR	8	(England) Ernie Taylor
CF	9	(England) Stan Mortensen
IL	10	(Scotland) Jackie Mudie
OL	11	(England) Bill Perry
Manager:
(England) Joe Smith

== See also ==
- 1953–54 Football League
- 1952–53 FA Cup
