= Dave Durie =

English footballer

Personal information
- Full name: David George Durie
- Date of birth: 13 August 1931
- Place of birth: Blackpool, England
- Date of death: 30 August 2016 (aged 85)
- Position: Inside forward

Senior career*
Years	Team	Apps	(Gls)
–1952	Oxford Amateurs	?	(?)
1952–1964	Blackpool	301	(84)
1964–1967	Chester	89	(4)
1967–1968	Fleetwood	48	(4)

Managerial career
- 1968: Fleetwood
- * Club domestic league appearances and goals

David George Durie (13 August 1931 – 30 August 2016) was an English professional footballer. He played as a forward and spent the majority of his playing career at Blackpool.

== Career ==
Blackpool-born Durie began his professional career with his hometown club in 1952. He was signed as a deputy to Allan Brown, but eventually succeeded him. He made his Football League debut on 23 February 1953 in a 2–0 defeat at Charlton Athletic. He made seven more league appearances that season, and scored one goal in a 5–1 defeat at Middlesbrough on 11 April.

In 1953–54, Durie made three league appearances. He again scored one goal, in a 4–2 victory over local rivals Preston North End at Bloomfield Road on 31 March 1954. Durie attained the same statistics in 1954–55, his goal this time coming in a 3–3 draw at Charlton Athletic on 16 September 1954. In 1955–56, with Allan Brown out through injury, Durie made fifteen league appearances, scoring fourteen goals. He also made his FA Cup debut, against Manchester City on 3 January 1956. The match was abandoned after 50 minutes due to fog, however.

Durie was the club's second-top scorer behind Jackie Mudie in 1956–57, with 22 goals in all competitions to his name. He scored a hat-trick in the second league game of the season, a 3–2 victory at Everton in front of 55,000 spectators. He also scored his first FA Cup goal, in a 6–2 win at home to Fulham in the fourth round. Two seasons later, it was Durie's strike against Bristol City in an FA Cup fourth-round replay that put Blackpool through to the next round. He scored again in the fifth round, with Blackpool eventually being eliminated after a sixth-round replay.

Durie scored the second hat-trick of his career in a 4–1 victory over Burnley in a league fixture on 10 October 1959. He scored another hat-trick later that season in an FA Cup third-round tie at home to Mansfield Town. His treble were the only goals of the game. In 1960–61, Durie scored his first goal in the brand-new League Cup competition. It came in a second-round replay at home to Leeds United, but Leeds progressed with a 3–1 scoreline. Durie had become the first Blackpool player to score in the League, FA Cup and League Cup.

In December 1963, club managers, players and the Professional Footballers' Association voted Durie as the best example of a player who had never been sent off or booked in over 300 League and cup games. Although he remained a regular in the team, Durie's goals dried up after manager Ron Suart moved him back in the formation. Durie's final appearance for Blackpool occurred on 28 December 1964, in a single-goal league defeat at Chelsea. He had scored in the reverse fixture two days earlier, although Blackpool lost 5–1 in front of their own fans.

He went on to play for Chester for three years, before finishing his career back on the Fylde Coast with Fleetwood, initially as a player for the 1967–68 season. He became player-manager in February 1968 but he broke his leg in Fleetwood's opening game of the 1968–69 season (their first in the newly formed Northern Premier League) and he was dismissed as manager shortly afterwards.

== Personal life ==
Durie was a Methodist Sunday School teacher during his playing days. His religious beliefs meant he would not play on Christian holidays. One such example was the Blackpool v. Preston North End West Lancashire derby on 4 April 1958, which happened to be Good Friday.

Durie died in August 2016, at the age of 85.
