= Roy Gratrix =

English footballer

Personal information
- Date of birth: 9 February 1932
- Place of birth: Salford, England
- Date of death: 20 April 2002 (aged 70)
- Position: Defender

Senior career*
Years	Team	Apps	(Gls)
–1953	Taylor Bros.	?	(?)
1953–1964	Blackpool	400	(0)
1961	→ Toronto City (loan)	8	(0)
1964–1965	Manchester City	15	(0)
1965	Toronto City	24	(1)
1965–1966	Bangor City	?	(?)
1966–1967	Fleetwood	63	(0)
- * Club domestic league appearances and goals

Roy Gratrix (9 February 1932 – 2002) was an English professional footballer. He played as a defender.

Gratrix began his professional career with Blackpool as a 20-year-old in September 1952, joining from Manchester side Taylor Bros. He made his debut for Blackpool on 13 March 1954, succeeding Eddie Shimwell in the right-back berth in a goalless draw against Middlesbrough at Bloomfield Road.

The following campaign, 1954–55, he retained his position, teaming-up with Tommy Garrett, although occasionally being asked to play at left-back.

In 1955–56, with Harry Johnston leaving to manage Reading, Gratrix moved to centre-half and remained there for the rest of his career.

Also during the 1955–56 season, Gratrix represented England at "B" level, playing against Switzerland at The Dell. England B won 4–1.

For the 1956–57 campaign, Gratrix was an ever-present in Blackpool's 46 league and cup fixtures, helping them to their second consecutive top-four finish in Division One. He repeated the feat the following season and also in 1961–62 (52 league and cup games).

On 19 October 1957, Gratrix had the chance to open his scoring account with the club. He took a penalty against Manchester United at Bloomfield Road, but he put it over the bar. He remained without a goal in his 436 games for Blackpool.

In 1964, after eleven years and four hundred league appearances for Blackpool, Gratrix was sold to Manchester City. He made fifteen league appearances for City before trying his hand at playing in Canada with Toronto City, where he finally experienced the sweet sensation of scoring a goal (away v Montreal Italica, 4 July 1965). He returned to the United Kingdom to finish his playing career with Welsh club Bangor City and Lancashire Combination club Fleetwood, who were at that time managed by his old Blackpool teammate Jimmy Kelly.

Gratrix died in 2002.
