= Harry Johnston (footballer, born 1919) =

English footballer (1919–1973)

Personal information
- Full name: Henry Johnston
- Date of birth: 26 September 1919
- Place of birth: Manchester, England
- Date of death: 12 October 1973 (aged 54)
- Place of death: Manchester, England
- Position: Defender

Youth career
- 193?–1934: Droylsden

Senior career*
Years	Team	Apps	(Gls)
1934–1955	Blackpool	386	(11)

International career
1946–1953	England	10	(0)

Managerial career
- 1955–1962: Reading
- 1969: Blackpool (caretaker)
- * Club domestic league appearances and goals

Henry Johnston (26 September 1919 – 12 October 1973) was an English footballer. He was the Football Writers' Association Footballer of the Year in 1951. He spent his entire professional playing career with Blackpool, with whom he appeared in three FA Cup Finals, winning one. During his career, he appeared in all three half-back positions, and even moved up to centre forward when needed.

== Club career ==
Blackpool signed Manchester-born Johnston as a 15-year-old apprentice. Three years later, on 20 November 1937, he made his debut in a 2–0 defeat to arch-rivals Preston North End at Deepdale. Despite the result, Johnston was named Man of the Match. For the final game of the season, at home to West Bromwich Albion, he was moved to the forward line. He responded by scoring Blackpool's third goal in their 3–1 victory. By the following season, he was a regular in the Seasiders' team.

After the war, during which he served in the Middle East, Johnston became the foundation on which the Blackpool team was built. As captain, he led them to FA Cup Final appearances in 1948, 1951, and the most famous final of all in 1953, when he became the first and, thus far, only Blackpool skipper to lift the trophy. He made 40 appearances and scored three goals in the competition in his career.

In 1951, Johnston was voted FWA Footballer of the Year. He was the subject of bids from other big clubs, but he always remained a one-club player.

He played his last game on 25 April 1955, at Newcastle United. At that point he had made more appearances for Blackpool than any other player; a record later broken by Jimmy Armfield.

== Blackpool F.C. Hall of Fame ==
Johnston was inducted into the Hall of Fame at Bloomfield Road, when it was officially opened by former Blackpool player Jimmy Armfield in April 2006. Organised by the Blackpool Supporters Association, Blackpool fans around the world voted on their all-time heroes. Five players from each decade are inducted; Johnston is in the 1950s.

== International career ==
For a man of his stature, his international career was very short, with only ten appearances for England in a seven-year span. His appearances were limited due to the consistent performances of Billy Wright.

Johnston made his England debut on 27 November 1946, in an 8–2 friendly victory over the Netherlands at Leeds Road. His tenth and final international appearance occurred on 25 November 1953, in the 6–3 defeat by Hungary at Wembley.

== Post-retirement ==
In late 1955 Johnston became manager of Reading, with whom he spent seven seasons. He returned to Bloomfield Road in 1967 as assistant manager to Stan Mortensen, and when Morty was sacked late in the 1968–69 campaign, he took over as caretaker manager. In February 1970, he became assistant secretary, a role that meant he was in charge of the ticket office and editing the club's programme.

When he died in his hometown of Manchester in 1973 at age 54, "the whole town of Blackpool mourned, for Harry Johnston was one of the greatest players ever to wear the tangerine shirt."

== Career statistics ==
=== Club ===
Appearances and goals by club, season and competition
Club	Season	League			FA Cup		Other		Total	
Club	Season	Division	Apps	Goals	Apps	Goals	Apps	Goals	Apps	Goals
Blackpool	1937–38	First Division	20	1	2	0	0	0	22	1
Blackpool	1938–39	First Division	35	0	1	0	0	0	36	0
Blackpool	1939–40	First Division	0	0	0	0	3 (Note: Three appearances in the league before the season was abandoned due to World War II which are not included in the league match total.)	0	3	0
Blackpool	1946–47	First Division	39	0	1	0	0	0	40	0
Blackpool	1947–48	First Division	36	1	6	1	0	0	36	2
Blackpool	1948–49	First Division	36	0	3	0	0	0	39	0
Blackpool	1949–50	First Division	39	2	4	0	0	0	43	0
Blackpool	1950–51	First Division	38	7	8	0	0	0	46	7
Blackpool	1951–52	First Division	31	0	1	1	0	0	32	1
Blackpool	1952–53	First Division	36	0	7	0	0	0	43	0
Blackpool	1953–54	First Division	35	0	4	1	1 (Note: Appearance in the FA Charity Shield)	0	40	0
Blackpool	1954–55	First Division	41	0	1	0	0	0	42	0
Blackpool	Total		386	11	38	3	4	0	428	14
Career total			386	11	38	3	4	0	428	14

=== International ===
Appearances and goals by national team and year
National team	Year	Apps	Goals
England	1946	1	0
England	1947	1	0
England	1951	1	0
England	1953	7	0
Total		10	0

=== Managerial statistics ===
Managerial record by team and tenure
Team	From	To	Record				
Team	From	To	P	W	D	L	Win %
Reading	1 November 1955	1 January 1963	356	143	76	137	40.2
Blackpool (caretaker)	April 1969	April 1969	?	?	?	?	?
Total			356	143	76	137	40.2

== Honours ==
Blackpool

- FA Cup: 1952–53; runner-up: 1947–48, 1950–51
- Lancashire FA Cup: 1953–54

England

- British Home Championship: 1946–47, 1953–54

Individual

- FWA Footballer of the Year: 1951

== See also ==
- List of one-club men in association football
