= Ralph Banks (footballer) =

English footballer

Personal information
- Date of birth: 20 June 1920
- Place of birth: Farnworth, Lancashire, England
- Date of death: 1 October 1993 (aged 73)
- Place of death: Bolton, England
- Position: Defender

Senior career*
Years	Team	Apps	(Gls)
1940–1954	Bolton Wanderers	104	(0)
1954–1955	Aldershot	43	(1)
Total		147	(1)
- * Club domestic league appearances and goals

Ralph Banks (20 June 1920 – 1 October 1993) was an English footballer.

He played for Bolton Wanderers from 1940 to 1954, although for the first years of his career he fought in the Second World War and, after the cessation of hostilities, was called up for national service. He played over a hundred games for the club, mostly at left back, and came up against Stanley Matthews in the 1953 FA Cup Final, which turned out to be his last game for the club. After leaving Bolton, he played for a season and a half at Aldershot before retiring.

Banks' younger brother Tommy Banks also played for Bolton Wanderers. Ralph Banks died in Bolton in 1993.

== Honours ==
Bolton Wanderers

- FA Cup runner-up: 1952–53
