= Stan Hanson =

English footballer

Personal information
- Full name: Stanley Hanson
- Date of birth: 27 December 1915
- Place of birth: Bootle, England
- Date of death: 24 November 1987 (aged 71)
- Place of death: Bolton, England
- Position: Goalkeeper

Senior career*
Years	Team	Apps	(Gls)
1936–1956	Bolton Wanderers	384	(0)
- * Club domestic league appearances and goals

Stanley Hanson (27 December 1915 – 24 November 1987) was an English footballer who played for Bolton Wanderers for his whole professional career.

== Career ==
Starting off as an amateur with Liverpool and Southport he turned down Aston Villa to sign professional forms for Bolton in October 1935.

He did not make the goalkeepers shirt his own until the 1938–39 season and then his career was interrupted by the Second World War.

He returned to top-flight football and stayed playing with Bolton until he was nearly 40. He was Bolton's keeper in the Matthews' Cup Final. When he retired from football he stayed with the club as coach of the reserve side as well as running the post office near Burnden Park.

== Personal life ==
Hanson was of Norwegian descent and had a brother, Alf, who also played for Liverpool as well as Chelsea. He served in the 53rd (Bolton) Field Regiment, Royal Artillery, during the Second World War.

== Honours ==
Bolton Wanderers

- FA Cup runner-up: 1952–53
