= Alan Withers =

English footballer

Personal information
- Full name: Alan Withers
- Date of birth: 20 October 1930
- Place of birth: Bulwell, Nottinghamshire, England
- Date of death: 29 November 2017 (aged 87)
- Place of death: Nottingham, England
- Position: Outside left

Youth career
- Aspley B.C.

Senior career*
Years	Team	Apps	(Gls)
1950–1955	Blackpool	17	(6)
1955–1958	Lincoln City	97	(18)
1958–1962	Notts County	121	(22)
- Wisbech Town
- * Club domestic league appearances and goals

Alan Withers (20 October 1930 – 29 November 2017) was an English footballer who scored 42 goals from 240 appearances in the Football League. He played for Blackpool, Lincoln City and Notts County, before moving into non-league football. He played on the left wing.

== Blackpool ==
Signed to Blackpool by Joe Smith on 4 July 1949, Withers made his League debut against Huddersfield Town on 18 November 1950, at inside-left, and became the first player to score a hat-trick on his First Division debut in the Seasiders' 3–1 victory. He was sold to Lincoln City for £350 on 28 February 1955 and went on to score seven other hat-tricks in League football whilst playing in the Second and Third Divisions.
