= Ewan Fenton =

Scottish footballer

Personal information
- Full name: Alexander Ewan Fenton
- Date of birth: 17 November 1929
- Place of birth: Dundee, Scotland
- Date of death: 3 April 2006 (aged 76)
- Place of death: Limerick, Ireland
- Position: Defender

Youth career
- Lochee Harp
- –1946: Dundee North End

Senior career*
| Years | Team | Apps | (Gls) |
| 1946–1959 | Blackpool | 195 | (20) |
| 1959–1960 | Wrexham | 24 | (0) |
| 1960–1967 | Limerick | ? | (?) |
| Total | | 219 + | (20 +) |

Managerial career
- 1960–1967: Limerick
- 1967–1970: Linfield
- 1970–1972: Limerick
- 1975–1976: Limerick
- * Club domestic league appearances and goals

Alexander Ewan Fenton (17 November 1929 – 3 April 2006) was a Scottish professional footballer. He spent thirteen seasons at Blackpool, with whom he was victorious in the famous FA Cup Final of 1953.

== Playing career ==
Born in Dundee, Fenton began his career with Scottish junior side Lochee Harp. In 1946, at the age of 17, he signed professional forms with Blackpool. He made his Seasiders debut at Bloomfield Road two years later, in September 1948, as understudy to skipper Harry Johnston.

In 1952–53, his patience was rewarded when he appeared regularly in the first team. He had established himself enough to the liking of manager Joe Smith that he made the starting eleven for the FA Cup Final.

In 1956, Fenton was named club captain.

Fenton had a transfer request turned down in 1958, but in May of 1959, he was released, and joined Wrexham for a small fee. He spent just over a year at the Racecourse Ground, although a serious injury almost ended his career.

== Managerial career ==
At the start of the 1960–61 season, Fenton joined Irish club Limerick as player/manager, the same season they played in the European Cup. He played in the 1965–66 European Cup Winners' Cup against PFC CSKA Sofia.

In 1967, he moved north of the border to become manager of Linfield. Three years later, however, he returned to Limerick, this time as full-time manager. In 1971, under his guidance, Limerick won their first ever cup, the FAI Cup, beating Drogheda in the final.

In 2003, Fenton returned to Bloomfield Road to attend a 50th anniversary reunion of the Tangerines' FA Cup victory with fellow surviving teammates.

== Personal life ==
Fenton settled in Limerick in 1960 and operated a driving school, "Ewan Fenton's School of Motoring" from 1965 to the late 1990s. He died there in 2006 at the age of 76 after a short illness and was survived by his Blackpool-born wife, Vera, son Ewan, and three grandchildren.

== Honours ==
=== As a player ===
Blackpool

- FA Cup: 1952–53

=== As a manager ===
Linfield

- IFA Premiership: 1968–69
- Irish Cup: 1970

Limerick

- FAI Cup: 1971
- FAI League Cup: 1975–76
