= Bobby Cunliffe (footballer, born 1928) =

English footballer

Personal information
- Full name: Robert Arthur Cunliffe
- Date of birth: 27 December 1928
- Place of birth: Garswood, England
- Date of death: 25 January 2000 (aged 71)
- Place of death: Wigan, England
- Position: Left wing

Youth career
- Haydock C & B

Senior career*
Years	Team	Apps	(Gls)
1949–1956	Manchester City	44	(9)
1956–1958	Chesterfield	62	(19)
1958–1959	Southport	17	(2)
- Earlstown
Total		123	(30)
- * Club domestic league appearances and goals

Bobby Cunliffe (27 December 1928 – 25 January 2000) was a footballer who played as a left winger in the Football League for Manchester City, Chesterfield and Southport.
