= Tommy Garrett (footballer) =

English footballer

Personal information
- Full name: Thomas Garrett
- Date of birth: 28 February 1926
- Place of birth: South Shields, England
- Date of death: 16 April 2006 (aged 80)
- Place of death: Wallsend, Australia
- Position: Defender

Senior career*
Years	Team	Apps	(Gls)
1946–1961	Blackpool	308	(3)
1961–1962	Millwall	12	(0)
1962–1963	Fleetwood	39	(0)
1963–1964	Wigan Athletic		
1964	Mayfield United		
Total		359	(3)

International career
1952–1953	England	3	(0)
- * Club domestic league appearances and goals

Thomas Garrett (28 February 1926 – 16 April 2006) was an English professional footballer. He represented his country on three occasions.

== Career ==
Garrett was a miner playing for Horden Colliery when Blackpool signed him as a 16-year-old in 1942, initially as a forward. It was as a full-back, however, that he established himself – and as a "footballing" defender, who preferred to pass his way out of trouble rather than kicking it downfield. He also spent hours practising heading the ball.

Garrett made his debut for the Seasiders on 29 March 1948, in a single-goal defeat at Derby County. He did not become a regular in the side until Ron Suart left for Blackburn Rovers in 1949.

The 1950s are the most successful decade in Blackpool's history to date. Garrett would be at the club playing top division football throughout, as would goalkeeper George Farm, fellow defender Hugh Kelly, right winger Stanley Matthews, forward Jackie Mudie and outside left Bill Perry.

He could perform equally well on either flank, and played in both the 1951 and 1953 FA Cup Finals, appearing in the latter with a broken nose sustained a week beforehand. It was during this period of his career that he gained his England caps, partnering Alf Ramsey. He made his international debut against Scotland on 5 April 1952.

After 14 years with Blackpool, Garrett joined Millwall on a free transfer in May 1961, making a dozen appearances for the Lions before retiring from the professional game and joining Fleetwood. He then played for a short time in Australia, with Mayfield United, and eventually settled there.

== Death ==
He died on 16 April 2006 in Wallsend, New South Wales.

== Honours ==
Blackpool

- FA Cup: 1952–53; runner-up: 1950–51
