= Dai Powell =

Welsh footballer

Personal information
- Full name: David Morgan Powell
- Date of birth: 19 January 1935 (age 91)
- Place of birth: Swansea, Wales
- Position: Left back

Senior career*
Years	Team	Apps	(Gls)
1952–1958	Blackpool	0	(0)
1958–1961	Rochdale	76	(1)
1961–1962	Rochdale Police		
Total		76	(1)
- * Club domestic league appearances and goals

David Morgan Powell (born 19 January 1935) is a Welsh former professional footballer who played as a left back.
