= 1953 FA Cup final =

1953 UK football match

- Event: 1952–53 FA Cup
Blackpool	Bolton Wanderers
4	3
- Date: 2 May 1953
- Venue: Wembley Stadium, London
- Referee: Sandy Griffiths (Abertillery)
- Attendance: 100,000

The 1953 FA Cup final, also known as the Matthews Final, was the eighth to be held at Wembley Stadium after the Second World War. The football match was contested between Blackpool and Bolton Wanderers, with Blackpool winning 4–3, equalling the record for the highest scoring FA Cup Final which had been set in the final of 1890. The match became famous for the performance of Blackpool winger Stanley Matthews, after whom it was nicknamed. It was the third FA Cup Final (after those in 1890 and 1894) to feature a hat-trick, scored by Blackpool's Stan Mortensen. Blackpool were making their third FA Cup final appearance in six years having been losing finalists twice, in 1948 and 1951.

In February 2010, the boots worn by Matthews in the match were auctioned at Bonhams in Chester for £38,400, to an undisclosed buyer and in November 2014 Matthews' winning medal was sold for £220,000. The match ball fetched £5,250 in 2018.

== Road to Wembley ==
- Third round
  - Sheffield Wednesday 1 Blackpool 2
  - Bolton Wanderers 4 Fulham 1
- Fourth round
  - Blackpool 1 Huddersfield Town 0
  - Bolton Wanderers 1 Notts County 1 – Replay 2–2, 2nd replay 1–0
- Fifth round
  - Blackpool 1 Southampton 1 – Replay 2–1
  - Luton Town 0 Bolton Wanderers 1
- Sixth round
  - Arsenal 1 Blackpool 2
  - Gateshead 0 Bolton Wanderers 1
- Semi-final
  - Blackpool 2 Tottenham Hotspur 1
  - Bolton Wanderers 4 Everton 3

== Match summary ==
Matthews inspired his team to come from 3–1 down against Bolton Wanderers, to win 4–3, and on a personal note, he claimed the trophy that had eluded him in two previous finals. Despite the final being more famous for the heroics of Matthews, Stan Mortensen scored three goals for Blackpool on the day, becoming the first and only player to have scored an FA Cup Final hat-trick at the original Wembley Stadium. Bill Perry scored the winning goal, following another Matthews' assist. Nat Lofthouse, who scored Bolton's first goal, scored in every round of that year's FA Cup. Bolton took the lead after just 75 seconds with a Nat Lofthouse shot. Mortensen equalised after 35 minutes with a deflected "cross-shot". Four minutes later, Bolton took the lead again when Willie Moir outstripped Blackpool's goalkeeper George Farm after short crossing pass of Bobby Langton and Bolton went in at half-time 2–1 ahead. Ten minutes into the second half, Eric Bell, playing through injury with a torn hamstring, put Bolton further ahead, a lead they kept for 13 minutes. Then came the turnaround for which the match has become famous, when Matthews proved to be the inspiration for a Blackpool comeback. His cross from the right wing, with 22 minutes remaining, was met by Mortensen who netted his and Blackpool's second goal. In the 89th minute, Mortensen completed his hat-trick and Blackpool's comeback to equalise directly from a free-kick. Then, with just seconds remaining, Matthews again crossed from the right wing. His cross, which passed just behind Mortensen, was met by Bill Perry, whose shot made the score 4–3 and won the match for the Seasiders. Even Nat Lofthouse, in defeat, is said to have stood and applauded.

=== Coverage ===
The match was considered the first major TV audience for a sporting event. Televisions had been bought or rented by many households for the forthcoming Coronation of Queen Elizabeth II. On radio the match was broadcast in full on the BBC World Service and the second half on the domestic Light Programme. After this final proved to be so popular, the Cup Final was given its own standalone slot and broadcast in full on TV and radio.

== Match details ==
2 May 1953
15:00 BST

Blackpool	4–3	Bolton Wanderers
Mortensen 35', 68', 89'; Perry 90+2'	(Report)	Lofthouse 2'; Moir 39'; Bell 55'

Wembley Stadium, London
Attendance: 100,000
Referee: B. M. Griffiths

Blackpool	Bolton Wanderers

GK	1	(Scotland) George Farm
RB	2	(England) Eddie Shimwell
LB	3	(England) Tommy Garrett
RH	4	(Scotland) Ewan Fenton
CH	5	(England) Harry Johnston (c)
LH	6	(England) Cyril Robinson
OR	7	(England) Stanley Matthews
IR	8	(England) Ernie Taylor
CF	9	(England) Stan Mortensen
IL	10	(Scotland) Jackie Mudie
OL	11	(England) Bill Perry
Manager:
(England) Joe Smith

GK	1	(England) Stan Hanson
RB	2	(England) John Ball
LB	3	(England) Ralph Banks
RH	4	(England) Johnny Wheeler
CH	5	(England) Malcolm Barrass
LH	6	(England) Eric Bell
OR	7	(England) Doug Holden
IR	8	(Scotland) Willie Moir (c)
CF	9	(England) Nat Lofthouse
IL	10	(England) Harold Hassall
OL	11	(England) Bobby Langton
Manager:
(England) Bill Ridding
