= David Frith (footballer) =

English footballer

Personal information
- Date of birth: 17 March 1929
- Place of birth: Liverpool, England
- Date of death: 29 May 2011 (aged 82)
- Place of death: Blackpool, Lancashire, England
- Position: Full back

Youth career
- Blackpool

Senior career*
Years	Team	Apps	(Gls)
1952–58	Blackpool	32	(0)
1958–63	Tranmere Rovers	177	(0)
1964	Fleetwood	11	(0)
Total		220	(0)
- * Club domestic league appearances and goals

David Frith was a footballer who played as full back for Blackpool, Tranmere Rovers and Fleetwood.
