= Eric Bell (footballer, born 1929) =

English footballer

Personal information
- Date of birth: 27 November 1929
- Place of birth: Manchester, England
- Date of death: 22 July 2012 (aged 82)
- Place of death: Wythenshawe, England
- Position: Wing-half

Senior career*
Years	Team	Apps	(Gls)
1950–1958	Bolton Wanderers	102	(1)
- * Club domestic league appearances and goals

Eric Bell (27 November 1929 – 22 July 2012) was an English football wing half who played in the 1950s. He only played for one club, Bolton Wanderers, for the whole of his senior career, and made over 100 Football League appearances for them.

He played for Bolton in the 1953 FA Cup final but was injured during the game. However, he still managed to score, and put Bolton 3–1 up, although they eventually lost to Blackpool 4–3.

Despite success at club level, he failed to receive a call-up for the England national team.

On 22 July 2012 Eric Bell died at the age of 82 after battling with Alzheimer's disease.

== Honours ==
Bolton Wanderers

- FA Cup runner-up: 1952–53
