= Johnny Walker (footballer, born 1928) =

Scottish footballer (1928–2019)

Personal information
- Full name: John Young Hilley Walker
- Date of birth: 17 December 1928
- Place of birth: Glasgow, Scotland
- Date of death: 23 January 2019 (aged 90)
- Position: Inside forward

Youth career
- 1944–1945: Campsie Black Watch

Senior career*
Years	Team	Apps	(Gls)
1947–1952	Wolverhampton Wanderers	37	(21)
1952–1957	Southampton	172	(48)
1957–1964	Reading	287	(24)
Total		496	(93)
- * Club domestic league appearances and goals

John Young Hilley Walker (17 December 1928 – 23 January 2019) was a Scottish footballer who played as an inside forward in the Football League for Wolverhampton Wanderers, Southampton and Reading.

== Career ==
Walker began his professional career when he joined Football League First Division side Wolverhampton Wanderers in 1947. He had to wait until 18 February 1950 to make his senior debut, when he played in a 1–0 win against Portsmouth, the first of twelve appearances during this season, which yielded eight goals.

The forward scored eleven times during the 1950–51 campaign, but found himself out of favour with manager Stan Cullis as time progressed, and by the next season he made only five appearances. Despite his record of 26 goals in 44 games, Walker was allowed to leave Molineux in October 1952 to join Southampton for £12,000.

He continued to score goals for his new club, netting 52 in total for the Saints during a six-season stay before he departed to join Reading in December 1957 for a £2,500 fee. He played for the Royals in the Third Division until retiring from playing in 1964.

Walker later also served Reading as their reserve team coach before leaving football in 1979 to work for the Royal Mail.

His death was reported on 24 January 2019.

== Bibliography ==
- Matthews, Tony (2001). The Wolves Who's Who. West Midlands: Britespot. ISBN 1-904103-01-4.
- Holley, Duncan; Chalk, Gary (2003). In That Number – A post-war chronicle of Southampton FC. Hagiology Publishing. ISBN 0-9534474-3-X.
