= Harry Sharratt =

English footballer (1929–2002)

Personal information
- Full name: Harold Sharratt
- Date of birth: 16 December 1929
- Place of birth: Wigan, England
- Date of death: 19 August 2002 (aged 72)
- Place of death: Lancaster, England
- Position: Goalkeeper

Senior career*
Years	Team	Apps	(Gls)
1949–1952	Wigan Athletic	63	(0)
1952–1953	Blackpool	1	(0)
- Bishop Auckland
1955–1956	Oldham Athletic	1	(0)
- Bishop Auckland
	Charlton Athletic	0	(0)
- Bishop Auckland
1957–1958	Nottingham Forest	1	(0)
- Bishop Auckland

International career
1956	Great Britain	2	(0)
- * Club domestic league appearances and goals

Harold Sharratt (16 December 1929 – 19 August 2002) was an English footballer who represented Great Britain at the 1956 Summer Olympics. Sharratt, who played as a goalkeeper, remained an amateur player throughout his career, working as a school teacher during the week. Sharratt played for non-league clubs including Wigan Athletic and Bishop Auckland, and also played as an amateur in the Football League for Blackpool, Oldham Athletic, Charlton Athletic and Nottingham Forest.

== Career ==
Sharratt started his career at Wigan Athletic. He spent three seasons at the club, making 86 appearances in all competitions.

Sharratt made his only League appearance for Blackpool in a 4–0 defeat at Tottenham Hotspur on 18 October 1952, deputising for George Farm. Farm had played 111 consecutive Football League games for the Tangerines, but he was making his debut for Scotland in their victory over Wales in the British International Championship the same day.

He returned to non-League football with Northern League club Bishop Auckland, making his debut in April 1953. He helped the club win three consecutive FA Amateur Cup finals between 1955 and 1957.
