= Billy Wright (footballer, born 1931) =

English footballer (1931–2020)

Personal information
- Full name: John William Wright
- Date of birth: 4 March 1931
- Place of birth: Blackpool, England
- Date of death: 14 April 2020 (aged 89)
- Position: Midfielder

Senior career*
Years	Team	Apps	(Gls)
1951–1955	Blackpool	15	(2)
1955–1958	Leicester City	27	(10)
1958–1959	Newcastle United	5	(3)
1959–1961	Plymouth Argyle	42	(9)
1961–1962	Millwall	15	(0)
- Tonbridge
- Bexley United
- * Club domestic league appearances and goals

John William Wright (4 March 1931 – 14 April 2020) was an English footballer who played in midfield. He played for Blackpool, Leicester City, Newcastle United, Plymouth Argyle and Millwall.

== Career ==
Wright began his career with his hometown club Blackpool in 1951. In four years he made fifteen League appearances, his chances largely limited by Stanley Matthews being ahead of him in the pecking order.

In 1955 he joined Leicester City, for whom he made 27 League appearances and scored ten goals.

After three years at Filbert Street, Wright moved north to Newcastle United in 1958. In five League appearances he scored three goals.

The south coast was Wright's next destination, in 1959. He joined Plymouth Argyle, and went onto make 42 League appearances for the club, netting nine goals.

In 1961 Wright signed for Millwall. He made fifteen League appearances in his one season with the Lions.

He moved into non-League football with Tonbridge Angels.

== Death ==
Wright died on 14 April 2020, aged 89.
