= Ernie Taylor (footballer, born 1925) =

English footballer and manager

Personal information
- Full name: Ernest Taylor
- Date of birth: 2 September 1925
- Place of birth: Sunderland, County Durham, England
- Date of death: 9 April 1985 (aged 59)
- Place of death: Birkenhead, England
- Height: 5 ft 4 in (1.63 m)
- Position: Inside forward

Senior career*
Years	Team	Apps	(Gls)
?–1942	Hylton Colliery		
1942–1951	Newcastle United	107	(19)
1951–1958	Blackpool	217	(53)
1958	Manchester United	22	(2)
1958–1961	Sunderland	68	(11)
1961	Altrincham	6	(0)
1961–1962	Derry	8	(1)
Total		414	(85)

International career
1953	England	1	(0)

Managerial career
- 1964–1965: New Brighton (NZ)
- * Club domestic league appearances and goals

Ernest Taylor (2 September 1925 – 9 April 1985) was an English footballer who played for four clubs in a 19-year professional career.

After Blackpool's defeat by Newcastle United in the 1951 FA Cup Final, it is said that Stanley Matthews told his manager, Joe Smith, that he would like the Magpies' inside-right in the Blackpool team. On 10 October that year, Taylor signed for Blackpool for £25,000.

Born in Sunderland, County Durham, in 1925, Taylor was a naval submariner when he joined Newcastle in 1942. At 5 ft 4 in, he was one of the shortest players in the game, but his defence-splitting passes caused problems amongst the opposition. It was his back-heel that set up one of Jackie Milburn's goals in the 1951 Final.

Taylor submitted a transfer request in September 1951, after being left out of the Newcastle side that defeated Burnley 7–1, claiming that he had been told he was not fit to play, despite getting a second opinion from his own doctor, who stated he was fit.

Within a month, he signed for Blackpool and made his debut on 13 October 1951 in a 2–1 home loss to Charlton. When Matthews had recovered from an injury, the pair created a well-respected right-wing partnership. On 25 November 1953, Walter Winterbottom employed the same partnership in England's match against Hungary. England lost 6–3 in what was Taylor's only appearance for his country.

Earlier in 1953, he had been a member of Blackpool's famous FA Cup-winning side that beat Bolton Wanderers. In the same competition in 1958, he helped the devastated Manchester United to an albeit unsuccessful appearance in the FA Cup Final soon after the Munich air disaster.

On 12 December 1958 Taylor signed for Sunderland for £6,000, and later played for Altrincham and Derry before emigrating to New Zealand, where he coached New Brighton and also played for Auckland club East Coast Bays.

== Honours ==
Newcastle United

- FA Cup: 1950–51

Blackpool

- FA Cup: 1952–53

Manchester United

- FA Cup runner-up: 1957–58
