= Jack Ainscough =

English footballer

Personal information
- Full name: John Ainscough
- Date of birth: 26 March 1926
- Place of birth: Adlington, England
- Date of death: 16 December 2004 (aged 78)
- Place of death: Bolton, England
- Position: Centre-half

Senior career*
Years	Team	Apps	(Gls)
1950–1954	Blackpool	7	(0)
1954–1966	Fleetwood Town	421	(?)
- * Club domestic league appearances and goals

John Ainscough (26 March 1926 – 16 December 2004) was an English professional footballer. A centre-half, he played in the Football League for Blackpool. He played seven League games for the club between 1950 and 1954. He moved to near neighbours Fleetwood Town in 1954, playing a then record 421 games for the club before retiring in 1966.
