= 1951 FA Cup final =

- Event: 1950–51 FA Cup
Newcastle United	Blackpool
2	0
- Date: 28 April 1951
- Venue: Wembley Stadium, London
- Referee: Bill Ling (Stapleford)
- Attendance: 100,000

The 1951 FA Cup final was contested by Newcastle United and Blackpool at Wembley on 28 April 1951. Newcastle won 2–0, with both goals scored by Jackie Milburn.

Bill Slater, who played at inside left for losers Blackpool, was the last surviving player to have appeared in the final. He died in December 2018 at the age of 91. The last surviving Newcastle United player from the final was Charlie Crowe, who died in February 2010 at the age of 85.

== Match details ==
28 April 1951

Newcastle United	2–0	Blackpool
Milburn 50' 55'	(Report)

Wembley, London
Attendance: 100,000 approx.
Referee: Bill Ling

Newcastle United	Blackpool

GK	1	(England) Jack Fairbrother
RB	2	(England) Bobby Cowell
LB	3	(England) Bobby Corbett
RH	4	(England) Joe Harvey (c)
CH	5	(Scotland) Frank Brennan
LH	6	(England) Charlie Crowe
OR	7	(England) Tommy Walker
IR	8	(England) Ernie Taylor
CF	9	(England) Jackie Milburn
IL	10	(Chile) George Robledo
OL	11	(Scotland) Bobby Mitchell
Manager:
(England) Stan Seymour

GK	1	(Scotland) George Farm
RB	2	(England) Eddie Shimwell
LB	3	(England) Tommy Garrett
RH	4	(England) Harry Johnston (c)
CH	5	(England) Eric Hayward
LH	6	(Scotland) Hugh Kelly
OR	7	(England) Stanley Matthews
IR	8	(Scotland) Jackie Mudie
CF	9	(England) Stan Mortensen
IL	10	(England) Bill Slater
OL	11	(England) Bill Perry
Manager:
(England) Joe Smith

== Broadcasting ==
Radio listeners around the nation could tune in to hear the match on the BBC light programme with commentary from Raymond Glendenning. However, only the second half of the match was televised by the BBC with commentary from Jimmy Jewell, his last cup final before his death the following year, and Kenneth Wolstenholme. The Television footage has since been lost.
