= 1951–52 Blackpool F.C. season =

English football club season

Blackpool F.C.
1951–52 season
- Manager: Joe Smith
- Division One: 9th
- FA Cup: Third Round
- Top goalscorer: League: Stan Mortensen (26); All: Stan Mortensen (26)
Home colours

The 1951–52 season was Blackpool F.C.'s 44th season (41st consecutive) in the Football League. They competed in the 22-team Division One, then the top tier of English football, finishing ninth. Stan Mortensen was the club's top scorer for the eighth consecutive season, with 26 goals in all competitions.

== Table ==
Pos	Team	Pld	W	D	L	GF	GA	GAv	Pts
7	Preston North End	42	17	12	13	74	54	1.370	46
8	Newcastle United	42	18	9	15	98	73	1.342	45
9	Blackpool	42	18	9	15	64	64	1.000	45
10	Charlton Athletic	42	17	10	15	68	63	1.079	44
11	Liverpool	42	12	19	11	57	61	0.934	43

Source: World Football
Rules for classification: 1) Points; 2) Goal average; 3) Goals scored
