= Bill Perry (footballer) =

South African footballer (1930–2007)

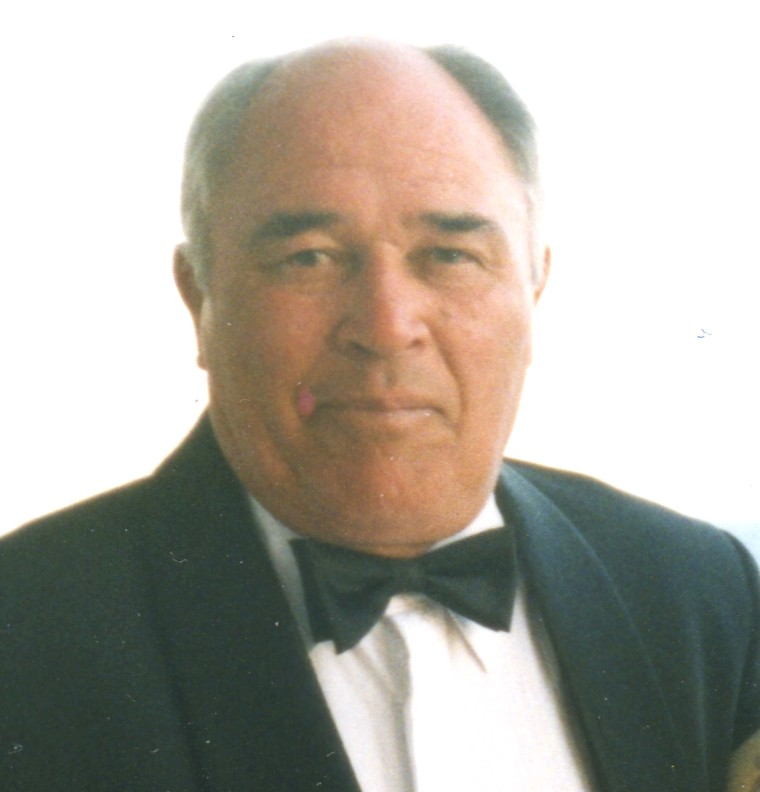

Personal information
- Full name: William Perry
- Date of birth: 10 September 1930
- Place of birth: Johannesburg, South Africa
- Date of death: 27 September 2007 (aged 77)
- Position: Outside left

Senior career*
Years	Team	Apps	(Gls)
1947–1949	Johannesburg Rangers	?	(?)
1949–1962	Blackpool	394	(119)
1962–1963	Southport	26	(0)
1963–1964	Hereford United	29	(0)
1964–1965	South Coast United		
1966–1967	Holyhead Town		

International career
1955–1956	England	3	(2)
- * Club domestic league appearances and goals

William Perry (10 September 1930 – 27 September 2007) was a professional footballer. He spent thirteen seasons at Blackpool from 1949 to 1962. Born in South Africa, he played for the England national team.

== Club career ==
Perry during his Blackpool days

Perry, an outside-left, signed for Blackpool in 1949 after being recommended to the club by scout Billy Butler, who coached him at Johannesburg Rangers.

Perry made his league debut for Blackpool on 18 March 1950, in a win at Manchester United. The following season, his FA Cup semi-final replay goal against Birmingham City helped put Blackpool into the Final against Newcastle United.

Perry's most notable achievement was scoring the injury-time winner in the 1953 FA Cup Final against Bolton Wanderers, cementing a comeback from 1–3 to 4–3 thanks to an earlier Stan Mortensen hat-trick. As in 1951, his semi-final goal, this time against Tottenham Hotspur, sent Blackpool on their way to Wembley.

During the 1955–56 season, Perry scored twenty goals (a record for a winger) (including a hat-trick in the first of two West Lancashire derbies in the space of twenty-four hours) to help Blackpool to their highest-ever league position of runners-up in the First Division.

A cartilage operation virtually ended Perry's playing career, and after being in and out of the side, he was transfer-listed in the summer of 1962.

Southport came in for his services, where he played 26 games from August 1962 until May 1963 when he joined Hereford United.

He remained at Edgar Street for just the one season and made a total of 29 appearances for Hereford during his time there. Perry left Hereford at the end of the 1963–64 season and had a short spell in Australia before retiring with Holyhead Town. He became a director of Fleetwood Town between 1967 and 1970.

== Blackpool F.C. Hall of Fame ==
Perry was inducted into the Hall of Fame at Bloomfield Road, when it was officially opened by former Blackpool player Jimmy Armfield in April 2006. Organised by the Blackpool Supporters Association, Blackpool fans around the world voted on their all-time heroes. Five players from each decade are inducted; Perry is in the 1950s.

== International career ==
Perry made three appearances for England, scoring two goals.

== Post-retirement ==
After retiring, Perry ran a couple of businesses in Blackpool, where he lived with his wife, Jean.

In January 2007, he was reunited with the FA Cup after 54 years when the trophy was taken to Bloomfield Road as part of the build-up to the Seasiders' fourth-round tie with Norwich City. Also in attendance was Cyril Robinson, at the time the only other surviving member of the cup-winning team. Perry died eight months later at the age of 77.

== Honours ==
Blackpool

- FA Cup: 1952–53; runner-up: 1950–51

== See also ==
- List of England international footballers born outside England
