= 1948–49 Blackpool F.C. season =

English football club season

Blackpool F.C.
1948–49 season
- Manager: Joe Smith
- Division One: 16th
- FA Cup: Fourth round
- Top goalscorer: League: Stan Mortensen (18); All: Stan Mortensen (20)
Home colours

The 1948–49 season was Blackpool F.C.'s 41st season (38th consecutive) in the Football League. They competed in the 22-team Division One, then the top tier of English football, finishing sixteenth.

Stan Mortensen was the club's top scorer for the fifth consecutive season, with twenty goals (eighteen in the league and two in the FA Cup).

== Table ==
Pos	Team	Pld	W	D	L	GF	GA	GAv	Pts
14	Bolton Wanderers	42	14	10	18	59	68	0.868	38
15	Burnley	42	12	14	16	43	50	0.860	38
16	Blackpool	42	11	16	15	54	67	0.806	38
17	Birmingham City	42	11	15	16	36	38	0.947	37
18	Everton	42	13	11	18	41	63	0.651	37

Source: World Football
Rules for classification: 1) Points; 2) Goal average; 3) Goals scored
