= Cyril Robinson (footballer) =

English footballer (1929–2019)

Personal information
- Date of birth: 4 March 1929
- Place of birth: Bulwell, England
- Date of death: 9 November 2019 (aged 90)
- Position: Wing-half

Youth career
- Nottingham Boys Club
- Basford Hall Youth Club

Senior career*
Years	Team	Apps	(Gls)
1947–1951	Mansfield Town		
1951–1955	Blackpool	21	(2)
1955–1956	Northwich Victoria		
1956–1959	Bradford Park Avenue	89	(3)
1959–1960	Southport	37	(0)
Total		147+	(5+)
- * Club domestic league appearances and goals

Cyril Robinson (4 March 1929 – 9 November 2019) was an English professional footballer.

He played for Nottingham Boys Club, Basford Hall Youth Club, Mansfield Town, Blackpool, Northwich Victoria, Bradford Park Avenue, Southport, Buxton, Lancaster City, Toronto City, Fleetwood, Blackpool Mechanics, Hellas, and Newcastle.

Robinson died in November 2019, aged 90. He was the last surviving member of the 1953 FA Cup-winning Blackpool team.

== Honours ==
Blackpool

- FA Cup: 1952–53
