= 1949–50 Blackpool F.C. season =

English football club season

Blackpool F.C.
1949–50 season
- Manager: Joe Smith
- Division One: 7th
- FA Cup: Sixth round
- Top goalscorer: League: Stan Mortensen (22); All: Stan Mortensen (25)
Home colours

The 1949–50 season was Blackpool F.C.'s 42nd season (39th consecutive) in the Football League. They competed in the 22-team Division One, then the top tier of English football, finishing seventh.

Stan Mortensen was the club's top scorer for the sixth consecutive season, with 25 goals (22 in the league and three in the FA Cup).

== Table ==
Pos	Team	Pld	W	D	L	GF	GA	GAv	Pts
5	Newcastle United	42	19	12	11	77	55	1.400	50
6	Arsenal	42	19	11	12	79	55	1.436	49
7	Blackpool	42	17	15	10	46	35	1.314	49
8	Liverpool	42	17	14	11	64	54	1.185	48
9	Middlesbrough	42	20	7	15	59	48	1.229	47

Source: World Football
Rules for classification: 1) Points; 2) Goal average; 3) Goals scored
