= 1954–55 Blackpool F.C. season =

English football club season

Blackpool F.C.
1954–55 season
- Manager: Joe Smith
- Division One: 19th
- FA Cup: Third round
- Top goalscorer: League: Stan Mortensen (11); All: Stan Mortensen (11)
Home colours

The 1954–55 season was Blackpool F.C.'s 47th season (44th consecutive) in the Football League. They competed in the 22-team Division One, then the top tier of English football, finishing nineteenth.

Stan Mortensen was the club's top scorer for the eleventh consecutive season, with eleven goals in all competitions.

Harry Johnston retired at the end of the season after 21 years of service for Blackpool, his only professional club. He remains the club's longest-serving player.

== Table ==
Pos	Team	Pld	W	D	L	GF	GA	GAv	Pts	Qualification or relegation
17	West Bromwich Albion	42	16	8	18	76	96	0.792	40	
18	Bolton Wanderers	42	13	13	16	62	69	0.899	39	
19	Blackpool	42	14	10	18	60	64	0.938	38	
20	Cardiff City	42	13	11	18	62	76	0.816	37	
21	Leicester City (R)	42	12	11	19	74	86	0.860	35	Relegation to the Second Division

Source: World Football
Rules for classification: 1) Points; 2) Goal average; 3) Goals scored
(R) Relegated
