= 1953–54 Blackpool F.C. season =

English football club season

Blackpool F.C.
1953–54 season
- Manager: Joe Smith
- Division One: 6th
- FA Cup: Fifth round
- Top goalscorer: League: Stan Mortensen (21); All: Stan Mortensen (22)
Home colours

The 1953–54 season was Blackpool F.C.'s 46th season (43rd consecutive) in the Football League. They competed in the 22-team Division One, then the top tier of English football, finishing sixth.

West Bromwich Albion succeeded Blackpool as the holders of the FA Cup. Blackpool were knocked out in the fifth round by Port Vale.

Stan Mortensen was the club's top scorer for the tenth consecutive season, with 22 goals (21 in the league and one in the FA Cup).

== Table ==
Pos	Team	Pld	W	D	L	GF	GA	GAv	Pts
4	Manchester United	42	18	12	12	73	58	1.259	48
5	Bolton Wanderers	42	18	12	12	75	60	1.250	48
6	Blackpool	42	19	10	13	80	69	1.159	48
7	Burnley	42	21	4	17	78	67	1.164	46
8	Chelsea	42	16	12	14	74	68	1.088	44

Source: World Football
Rules for classification: 1) Points; 2) Goal average; 3) Goals scored
