= George Farm =

Scottish footballer and manager

- Farm playing for Scotland in 1959

Personal information
- Full name: George Neil Farm
- Date of birth: 13 July 1924
- Place of birth: Slateford, Scotland
- Date of death: 18 July 2004 (aged 80)
- Place of death: Edinburgh, Scotland
- Position: Goalkeeper

Youth career
- Armadale Thistle

Senior career*
Years	Team	Apps	(Gls)
1947–1948	Hibernian	7	(0)
1948–1960	Blackpool	461	(1)
1960–1964	Queen of the South	119	(0)
Total		587	(1)

International career
1952–1959	Scotland	10	(0)

Managerial career
- 1961–1964: Queen of the South (player-manager)
- 1964–1967: Raith Rovers
- 1967–1970: Dunfermline Athletic
- 1971–1974: Raith Rovers
- * Club domestic league appearances and goals

George Neil Farm (13 July 1924 – 18 July 2004) was a Scottish professional football goalkeeper and manager.

Born in Slateford, a suburb of Edinburgh, Farm represented his country on ten occasions, the last three of which occurred after a gap of five years. He played briefly for Hibernian before making over 500 appearances for Blackpool winning the FA Cup once and collecting one FA Cup runners-up medal. With Blackpool he also finished runners-up once in the league to Manchester United. He made over 100 appearances for Queen of the South who he also managed in a promotion to Scotland's top division. he repeated that promotion managing Raith Rovers. He managed Dunfermline Athletic to a Scottish Cup victory and the semi-finals of the European Cup Winners' Cup.

== Style of play ==
Well-built, Farm possessed a distinctive way of holding the ball, preferring to catch it with one hand above and one below, as opposed to the more orthodox style of one hand on either side of the ball. He was a perfectionist, and could often be seen practicing long after his teammates had left.

== Hibernian ==
After playing junior football with Armadale Thistle, Farm began his professional career in 1947 at Hibernian. After a year and only seven first-team appearances at Easter Road, Farm signed for Blackpool. Farm was kept out of the Hibs team by the good form of Jimmy Kerr.

== Blackpool ==
Farm signed for Blackpool, then in the England first division, on a free transfer. He went on to break several appearance records. Farm made his league debut for Blackpool on 18 September 1948, replacing an out-of-form Joe Robinson, in a home draw against Bolton Wanderers. Robinson did not play for Blackpool again, as Farm went on to play in 111 consecutive league games. The first game he missed, due to his receiving a first cap for Scotland, on 18 October 1952, Blackpool lost, 4–0 at Tottenham Hotspur. Harry Sharratt deputised for that game.

Farm also played in all 47 of Blackpool's FA Cup ties between 1949 and 1960. He was runner-up in the 1951 FA Cup Final and winner in the 1953 FA Cup Final

On 29 October 1955, in a 6–2 home defeat by Preston North End, Farm became one of the few goalkeepers to score a goal. He injured a shoulder and replaced Mudie at centre-forward, where he proceeded to open the scoring with his head. That season, Blackpool finished league runners-up to Manchester United, the highest finish in the club's history.

In February 1960, at the age of 35 and after over 500 first-team appearances for the Tangerines (all while in the top division), Farm was granted a transfer. Blackpool manager Ron Suart, who had once been the goalkeeper's teammate, accepted a bid of £3,000 for the Scot from Queen of the South.

== Scotland ==
Farm's ten full Scotland caps included a 3 – 2 victory over West Germany at Hampden Park in 1959. In both games he played against England, he opposed future Queen of the South teammate Ivor Broadis. Farm was not part of Scotland's trip to the 1954 FIFA World Cup finals despite having played in the qualification campaign.

#	Date	Opponent	Result	Competition
1	18 October 1952	Wales	Scotland 2 – 1 Wales	British International Championship
2	5 November 1952	Northern Ireland	Scotland 1 – 1 Northern Ireland	British International Championship
3	18 April 1953	England	England 2 – 2 Scotland	British International Championship
4	6 May 1953	Sweden	Scotland 1 – 2 Sweden	Challenge match
5	3 October 1953	Northern Ireland	Northern Ireland 1 – 3 Scotland	FIFA World Cup qualifier
6	4 November 1953	Wales	Scotland 3 – 3 Wales	FIFA World Cup qualifier
7	3 April 1954	England	Scotland 2 – 4 England	FIFA World Cup qualifier
8	6 May 1959	Germany	Scotland 3 – 2 West Germany	Challenge match
9	27 May 1959	Netherlands	Netherlands 1 – 2 Scotland	Challenge match
10	3 June 1959	Portugal	Portugal 1 – 0 Scotland	Challenge match

== Queen of the South ==
With his dedication to fitness and practice, 35-year-old Farm was still a highly capable goalkeeper (only eight months before he played for Scotland) when he was signed to Queen of the South by manager Jimmy McKinnell, Jr. He went on to make 119 league appearances for the Dumfries club, replacing McKinnell to become player-manager in three of his four years with the club. He guided Queens to the semi-final of the 1960–61 Scottish League Cup. He also steered Queens back to the Scottish First Division with promotion as Second Division runners-up in 1961–62 with a team that included future Scotland centre forward Neil Martin, right winger Ernie Hannigan (later re-united with Martin in England's top flight at Coventry City) and goals king of Queens Jim Patterson. On their return to the top flight Farm played when his team defeated Celtic 1–0 at Celtic Park in the league on 10 November 1962. John Murphy scored Queen's goal.

In January 1964, Farm was sacked. The local press was filled with comments backing Farm and criticising the Willie Harkness-led board. Harkness initially announced Farm had "left by mutual consent" before admitting the club's directors had met to "relieve Mr. Farm of his duties as manager". The board retained him as a player, even though Farm had promptly dropped himself the month before after Queens signed young goalkeeper Allan Ball to take over the number 1 jersey debuting on 14 December 1963 against Falkirk. Harkness and the board took charge of team affairs, but the club were relegated.

== Raith Rovers (first spell) ==
A trio of three-year managerial appointments followed between the mid-1960s and mid-'70s. Firstly, from 1964 until 1967, he was in charge of Raith Rovers. In his final season at Raith, Farm repeated his achievements at Queens by guiding Rovers to promotion to Scotland's top division.

== Dunfermline Athletic ==
Between 1967 and 1970, Farm took charge of Dunfermline, with whom he won 51 out of 107 league games, in addition to winning the Scottish Cup in 1968 and guiding them to the semi-finals of the resulting 1969 UEFA Cup Winners' Cup campaign. Dunfermline lost by one goal on aggregate to eventual winners Slovan Bratislava (Slovan beat FC Barcelona in the final). This is the greatest achievement in Dunfermline's history, surpassing even that of Jock Stein's time at the club.

He was subsequently a first time inductee into the Dunfermline Athletic Hall of Fame in 2005.

== Raith Rovers (second spell) ==
A second stint followed at Raith Rovers, from 1971 until 1974.

== Retirement ==
When Farm finally retired from football in 1974, he and his wife enjoyed a quiet life in Edinburgh. He was known in his later years as a commentator and journalist, but also spent a short spell as a lighthouse keeper.

In 1988, Farm returned to Bloomfield Road to take part in Blackpool F.C.'s celebrations to mark the Football League's centenary.

Farm died in 2004 in the city of his birth, five days after his 80th birthday.

== Honours ==
=== As a player ===
Blackpool

- FA Cup: 1952–53; runner-up: 1950–51

=== As a player-manager ===
Queen of the South

- Scottish Second Division promotion: 1961–62

=== As a manager ===
Raith Rovers

- Scottish Second Division promotion: 1966–67

Dunfermline Athletic

- Scottish Cup: 1968
