= 1955–56 Blackpool F.C. season =

English football club season

Blackpool F.C.
1955–56 season
- Manager: Joe Smith
- Division One: 2nd
- FA Cup: Third round
- Top goalscorer: League: Jackie Mudie (22); All: Jackie Mudie (22)
Home colours

The 1955–56 season was Blackpool F.C.'s 48th season (45th consecutive) in the Football League. They competed in the 22-team Division One, then the top tier of English football, finishing second, their highest finish in the English league system to date, despite losing their final four League games.

Jackie Mudie was the club's top scorer, with 22 goals in all competitions.

== Table ==
Pos	Team	Pld	W	D	L	GF	GA	GAv	Pts	Qualification or relegation
1	Manchester United (C)	42	25	10	7	83	51	1.627	60	Qualification for the European Cup preliminary round
2	Blackpool	42	20	9	13	86	62	1.387	49	
3	Wolverhampton Wanderers	42	20	9	13	89	65	1.369	49	
4	Manchester City	42	18	10	14	82	69	1.188	46	
5	Arsenal	42	18	10	14	60	61	0.984	46	

Source: World Football
Rules for classification: 1) Points; 2) Goal average; 3) Goals scored
(C) Champions
