= 1956–57 Blackpool F.C. season =

English football club season

Blackpool F.C.
1956–57 season
- Manager: Joe Smith
- Division One: 4th
- FA Cup: Fifth round
- Top goalscorer: League: Jackie Mudie (32); All: Jackie Mudie (38)
Home colours

The 1956–57 season was Blackpool F.C.'s 49th season (46th consecutive) in the Football League. They competed in the 22-team Division One, then the top tier of English football, finishing fourth.

Jackie Mudie was the club's top scorer for the second consecutive season, with 38 goals (32 in the league and six in the FA Cup, including four against Fulham in the fourth round).

== Table ==
Pos	Team	Pld	W	D	L	GF	GA	GAv	Pts
2	Tottenham Hotspur	42	22	12	8	104	56	1.857	56
3	Preston North End	42	23	10	9	84	56	1.500	56
4	Blackpool	42	22	9	11	93	65	1.431	53
5	Arsenal	42	21	8	13	85	69	1.232	50
6	Wolverhampton Wanderers	42	20	8	14	94	70	1.343	48

Source: World Football
Rules for classification: 1) Points; 2) Goal average; 3) Goals scored
