= 1950–51 FA Cup =

Tournament details
- Country: England; Wales

Final positions
- Champions: Newcastle United (4th title)
- Runners-up: Blackpool

The 1950–51 FA Cup was the 70th season of the world's oldest football cup competition, the Football Association Challenge Cup, commonly known as the FA Cup. Newcastle United won the competition for the fourth time, beating Blackpool 2–0 in the final at Wembley, London.

Matches were scheduled to be played at the stadium of the team named first on the date specified for each round, which was always a Saturday. If scores were level after 90 minutes had been played, a replay would take place at the stadium of the second-named team later the same week. If the replayed match was drawn further replays would be held at neutral venues until a winner was determined. If scores were level after 90 minutes had been played in a replay, a 30-minute period of extra time would be played.

== Calendar ==
Round	Date
Extra preliminary round	Saturday 2 September 1950
Preliminary round	Saturday 16 September 1950
First round qualifying	Saturday 30 September 1950
Second round qualifying	Saturday 14 October 1950
Third round qualifying	Saturday 28 October 1950
Fourth round qualifying	Saturday 11 November 1950
First round proper	Saturday 25 November 1950
Second round proper	Saturday 9 December 1950
Third round proper	Saturday 6 January 1951
Fourth round proper	Saturday 27 January 1951
Fifth round proper	Saturday 10 February 1951
Sixth round proper	Saturday 24 February 1951
Semi-finals	Saturday 10 March 1951
Final	Saturday 28 April 1951

== Qualifying rounds ==
Most teams that were not members of the Football League competed in the qualifying rounds to secure one of 25 places available in the first round. This season, newly-elected Third Division clubs Colchester United, Scunthorpe & Lindsey United and Shrewsbury Town were also entered in the qualifying rounds, although Shrewsbury Town had to forfeit their preliminary round match against Oswestry Town as it clashed with a League fixture against York City. Colchester and Scunthorpe were entered in the fourth qualifying round, and were (as of 2026) the last Football League clubs to compete in FA Cup qualifying round fixtures.

The 25 winners from the fourth qualifying round were Ashington, North Shields, Bishop Auckland, Scarborough, Cleator Moor Celtic, Nelson, Witton Albion, Rhyl, Bromsgrove Rovers, Hereford United, Linby Colliery, Worcester City, Gainsborough Trinity, Dartford, Tooting & Mitcham United, Guildford City, Walthamstow Avenue, Tonbridge, Chelmsford City, Bromley, Glastonbury, Cheltenham Town, Llanelli, Gloucester City and Colchester United.

Those appearing in the competition proper for the first time were Cleator Moor Celtic, Linby Colliery, Tonbridge and Glastonbury. Of the others, Nelson had not featured at this stage since 1932–33, Ashington since 1929-30, Worcester City since 1928-29 and Llanelli since 1923-24. With the FA tightening Cup entry requirements in the following seasons, it would also be Cleator Moor Celtic's last appearance at any stage of the competition for 38 years.

Linby Colliery was also the only club to progress from the extra preliminary round to the main draw, defeating Parliament Street Methodists, Retford Town, Shirebrook, Boston United, Spalding United and Nuneaton Borough in order to qualify.

== Results ==
=== First round proper ===
At this stage 42 of 48 clubs from the Football League Third Division North and South joined the 24 non-league clubs and Colchester United who came through the qualifying rounds. Gateshead, Northampton Town and Stockport County were given byes to the third round. The fourth of the new clubs admitted to the League this season, Gillingham entered in this round as did non-league Willington, who were the champions from the previous season's FA Amateur Cup.

Matches were played on Saturday, 25 November 1950. Six matches were drawn, with replays taking place later the same week.

Tie no	Home team	Score	Away team	Date	Attendance	Notes
1	Chester	1–2	Bradford Park Avenue	25 November 1950		
2	Darlington	2–7	Rotherham United	25 November 1950		
3	Bournemouth & Boscombe Athletic	1–0	Colchester United	25 November 1950		
4	Bristol City	4–0	Gloucester City	25 November 1950		
5	Rochdale	3–1	Willington	25 November 1950		
6	Reading	3–1	Cheltenham Town	25 November 1950		
7	Nottingham Forest	6–1	Torquay United	25 November 1950		
8	Crewe Alexandra	4–0	North Shields	25 November 1950		
9	Lincoln City	1–1	Southport	25 November 1950		
Replay	Southport	3–2	Lincoln City	28 November 1950		
10	Gainsborough Trinity	0–3	Plymouth Argyle	25 November 1950		
11	Scarborough	1–2	Rhyl	25 November 1950		
12	Wrexham	1–0	Accrington Stanley	25 November 1950		
13	Bishop Auckland	2–2	York City	25 November 1950		
Replay	York City	2–1	Bishop Auckland	29 November 1950		
14	Bristol Rovers	1–1	Llanelli	25 November 1950		
Replay	Llanelli	1–1	Bristol Rovers	28 November 1950		
2nd replay	Bristol Rovers	3–1	Llanelli	4 December 1950		^{[A]}
15	Norwich City	2–0	Watford	25 November 1950		
16	Glastonbury	1–2	Exeter City	25 November 1950		
17	Bradford City	2–2	Oldham Athletic	25 November 1950		
Replay	Oldham Athletic	2–1	Bradford City	28 November 1950		
18	Carlisle United	2–1	Barrow	25 November 1950		
19	Crystal Palace	1–4	Millwall	29 November 1950		^{[B]}
20	Worcester City	1–4	Hartlepools United	25 November 1950		
21	Witton Albion	1–2	Nelson	25 November 1950		
22	Southend United	0–3	Swindon Town	25 November 1950		
23	Mansfield Town	1–0	Walthamstow Avenue	25 November 1950		
24	Bromsgrove Rovers	1–3	Hereford United	25 November 1950		
25	Port Vale	3–2	New Brighton	25 November 1950		
26	Halifax Town	2–3	Ashington	25 November 1950		
27	Newport County	4–2	Walsall	25 November 1950		
28	Cleator Moor Celtic	0–5	Tranmere Rovers	25 November 1950		^{[C]}
29	Aldershot	2–2	Bromley	25 November 1950		
Replay	Bromley	0–1	Aldershot	29 November 1950		
30	Guildford City	1–5	Dartford	25 November 1950		
31	Tooting & Mitcham United	2–3	Brighton & Hove Albion	25 November 1950		
32	Chelmsford City	2–2	Tonbridge	25 November 1950		
Replay	Tonbridge	0–1	Chelmsford City	29 November 1950		
33	Leyton Orient	1–2	Ipswich Town	25 November 1950	10,560	
34	Linby Colliery	1–4	Gillingham	25 November 1950		

=== Second round proper ===
The matches were played on Saturday, 9 December 1950. Three matches were drawn, with replays taking place on the following Wednesday. One second replay was played on Monday, 18 December 1950.

Tie no	Home team	Score	Away team	Date	Attendance	Notes
1	Ashington	1–2	Rochdale	9 December 1950		
2	Bristol City	2–1	Wrexham	9 December 1950		
3	Reading	4–0	Dartford	9 December 1950		
4	Crewe Alexandra	2–2	Plymouth Argyle	9 December 1950		
Replay	Plymouth Argyle	3–0	Crewe Alexandra	13 December 1950		
5	Bristol Rovers	2–2	Gillingham	9 December 1950		
Replay	Gillingham	1–1	Bristol Rovers	13 December 1950		
2nd replay	Bristol Rovers	2–1	Gillingham	18 December 1950		^{[D]}
6	Brighton & Hove Albion	2–0	Ipswich Town	9 December 1950	14,411	
7	Rhyl	0–1	Norwich City	9 December 1950		
8	Millwall	1–1	Bradford Park Avenue	9 December 1950		
Replay	Bradford Park Avenue	0–1	Millwall	13 December 1950		
9	Exeter City	3–0	Swindon Town	9 December 1950		
10	Hartlepools United	1–2	Oldham Athletic	9 December 1950		
11	Port Vale	3–2	Nelson	9 December 1950		
12	Southport	1–3	Carlisle United	9 December 1950		
13	York City	2–1	Tranmere Rovers	9 December 1950		
14	Hereford United	0–3	Newport County	9 December 1950		
15	Rotherham United	3–1	Nottingham Forest	9 December 1950		
16	Aldershot	3–0	Bournemouth & Boscombe Athletic	9 December 1950		
17	Chelmsford City	1–4	Mansfield Town	9 December 1950		

=== Third round proper ===
The 44 First and Second Division clubs entered the competition at this stage along with Gateshead, Northampton Town and Stockport County.

The matches were scheduled to be played on Saturday, 6 January 1951, though two were postponed until later the same week. Five matches were drawn, with replays taking place later the same week. For the first time since 1924–25, no teams from the qualifying rounds reached this stage (or its pre-1925 equivalent).

Tie no	Home team	Score	Away team	Date	Attendance	Notes
1	Bristol City	2–1	Blackburn Rovers	6 January 1951		
2	Rochdale	2–3	Chelsea	9 January 1951		
3	Leicester City	0–3	Preston North End	6 January 1951		
4	Notts County	3–4	Southampton	6 January 1951		
5	Aston Villa	2–0	Burnley	6 January 1951		
6	Bolton Wanderers	2–0	York City	6 January 1951		
7	Grimsby Town	3–3	Exeter City	6 January 1951		
Replay	Exeter City	4–2	Grimsby Town	10 January 1951		
8	Sunderland	2–0	Coventry City	6 January 1951		
9	Derby County	2–2	West Bromwich Albion	6 January 1951		
Replay	West Bromwich Albion	0–1	Derby County	10 January 1951		
10	Luton Town	2–0	Portsmouth	6 January 1951		
11	Sheffield United	1–0	Gateshead	6 January 1951		
12	Stockport County	2–1	Brentford	6 January 1951		
13	Newcastle United	4–1	Bury	6 January 1951		
14	Queens Park Rangers	3–4	Millwall	6 January 1951		
15	Fulham	1–0	Sheffield Wednesday	6 January 1951		
16	Bristol Rovers	5–1	Aldershot	10 January 1951		
17	Northampton Town	3–1	Barnsley	6 January 1951		
18	West Ham United	2–1	Cardiff City	6 January 1951		
19	Brighton & Hove Albion	2–1	Chesterfield	6 January 1951		
20	Manchester United	4–1	Oldham Athletic	6 January 1951		
21	Norwich City	3–1	Liverpool	6 January 1951		
22	Plymouth Argyle	1–2	Wolverhampton Wanderers	6 January 1951		
23	Hull City	2–0	Everton	6 January 1951		
24	Huddersfield Town	2–0	Tottenham Hotspur	6 January 1951		
25	Mansfield Town	2–0	Swansea Town	6 January 1951		
26	Newport County	3–2	Reading	6 January 1951		
27	Charlton Athletic	2–2	Blackpool	6 January 1951		
Replay	Blackpool	3–0	Charlton Athletic	10 January 1951		
28	Arsenal	0–0	Carlisle United	6 January 1951		
Replay	Carlisle United	1–4	Arsenal	11 January 1951		
29	Leeds United	1–0	Middlesbrough	6 January 1951		
30	Stoke City	2–2	Port Vale	6 January 1951		
Replay	Port Vale	0–1	Stoke City	8 January 1951		^{[E]}
31	Rotherham United	2–1	Doncaster Rovers	6 January 1951		
32	Birmingham City	2–0	Manchester City	6 January 1951	30,057	

=== Fourth round proper ===
The matches were played on Saturday, 27 January 1951. Two matches were drawn, the replays being played on Wednesday, 31 January 1951.

Tie no	Home team	Score	Away team	Date	Attendance	Notes
1	Blackpool	2–1	Stockport County	27 January 1951		
2	Bristol City	1–0	Brighton & Hove Albion	27 January 1951		
3	Preston North End	0–2	Huddersfield Town	27 January 1951		
4	Wolverhampton Wanderers	3–1	Aston Villa	27 January 1951		
5	Sunderland	2–0	Southampton	27 January 1951		
6	Derby County	1–3	Birmingham City	27 January 1951	37,384	
7	Luton Town	1–2	Bristol Rovers	27 January 1951		
8	Sheffield United	0–0	Mansfield Town	27 January 1951		
Replay	Mansfield Town	4–2	Sheffield United	31 January 1951		
9	Newcastle United	3–2	Bolton Wanderers	27 January 1951		
10	Manchester United	4–0	Leeds United	27 January 1951		
11	Millwall	0–1	Fulham	27 January 1951		
12	Hull City	2–0	Rotherham United	27 January 1951		
13	Exeter City	1–1	Chelsea	27 January 1951		
Replay	Chelsea	2–0	Exeter City	31 January 1951		
14	Newport County	0–2	Norwich City	27 January 1951		
15	Arsenal	3–2	Northampton Town	27 January 1951		
16	Stoke City	1–0	West Ham United	27 January 1951		

=== Fifth round proper ===
The matches were played on Saturday, 10 February 1951. One match was drawn and replayed the following Wednesday.

Tie no	Home team	Score	Away team	Date	Attendance	Notes
1	Blackpool	2–0	Mansfield Town	10 February 1951		
2	Wolverhampton Wanderers	2–0	Huddersfield Town	10 February 1951		
3	Sunderland	3–1	Norwich City	10 February 1951		
4	Bristol Rovers	3–0	Hull City	10 February 1951		
5	Manchester United	1–0	Arsenal	10 February 1951		
6	Chelsea	1–1	Fulham	10 February 1951		
Replay	Fulham	3–0	Chelsea	14 February 1951		
7	Stoke City	2–4	Newcastle United	10 February 1951		
8	Birmingham City	2–0	Bristol City	10 February 1951	47,831	

=== Sixth round proper ===
24 February 1951

Blackpool	1 – 0	Fulham

Bloomfield Road, Blackpool
24 February 1951

Sunderland	1 – 1	Wolverhampton Wanderers

Roker Park, Sunderland
24 February 1951

Newcastle United	0 – 0	Bristol Rovers

St James' Park, Newcastle upon Tyne
24 February 1951

Birmingham City	1 – 0	Manchester United
Higgins

St Andrew's, Birmingham
Attendance: 50,000

==== Replays ====
28 February 1951

Wolverhampton Wanderers	3 – 1	Sunderland

Molineux, Wolverhampton
28 February 1951

Bristol Rovers	1 – 3	Newcastle United

Eastville, Bristol

=== Semi-finals ===
10 March 1951

Blackpool	0 – 0	Birmingham City

Maine Road, Manchester
Attendance: 70,000

10 March 1951

Newcastle United	0 – 0	Wolverhampton Wanderers

Hillsborough, Sheffield

==== Replays ====
14 March 1951

Birmingham City	1 – 2	Blackpool
Smith

Goodison Park, Liverpool
Attendance: 70,114

14 March 1951

Wolverhampton Wanderers	1 – 2	Newcastle United

Leeds Road, Huddersfield

=== Final ===
The final took place on Saturday, 28 April 1951 at Wembley and ended in a victory for Newcastle United over Blackpool by 2–0, with both goals scored by Jackie Milburn. The attendance was 100,000.

28 April 1951
15:00 BST

Newcastle United	2 – 0	Blackpool
Milburn 50' 55'

Wembley, London
Attendance: 100,000
Referee: Bill Ling

Newcastle United	Blackpool

== Notes ==
A.: Match played at Ninian Park, Cardiff.
B.: The original tie was abandoned after 34 minutes due to fog, with the score 0–0.
C.: Match played at Borough Park, Workington.
D.: Match played at White Hart Lane, London.
E.: Match played at Victoria Ground, Stoke-on-Trent.
