= 1952–53 FA Cup =

Tournament details
- Country: England; Wales

Final positions
- Champions: Blackpool (1st title)
- Runners-up: Bolton Wanderers

The 1952–53 FA Cup was the 72nd season of the world's oldest football cup competition, the Football Association Challenge Cup, commonly known as the FA Cup. Blackpool won the competition for the first time, beating Bolton Wanderers 4–3 in the final at Wembley.

Matches were scheduled to be played at the stadium of the team named first on the date specified for each round, which was always a Saturday. Some matches, however, might be rescheduled for other days if there were clashes with games for other competitions or the weather was inclement. If scores were level after 90 minutes had been played, a replay would take place at the stadium of the second-named team later the same week. If the replayed match was drawn further replays would be held until a winner was determined. If scores were level after 90 minutes had been played in a replay, a 30-minute period of extra time would be played.

== Calendar ==
| Round | Date |
|---|---|
| Preliminary round | Saturday 13 September 1952 |
| First round qualifying | Saturday 27 September 1952 |
| Second round qualifying | Saturday 11 October 1952 |
| Third round qualifying | Saturday 25 October 1952 |
| Fourth round qualifying | Saturday 8 November 1952 |
| First round proper | Saturday 22 November 1952 |
| Second round proper | Saturday 6 December 1952 |
| Third round proper | Saturday 10 January 1953 |
| Fourth round proper | Saturday 31 January 1953 |
| Fifth round proper | Saturday 14 February 1953 |
| Sixth round proper | Saturday 28 February 1953 |
| Semi-finals | Saturday 21 March 1953 |
| Final | Saturday 2 May 1953 |

== Qualifying rounds ==
Most participating clubs that were not members of the Football League competed in the qualifying rounds to secure one of 30 places available in the first round.

The winners from the fourth qualifying round were Ashington, North Shields, Bishop Auckland, Horden Colliery Welfare, Scarborough, Netherfield, Ashton United, Rhyl, Bangor City, Kidderminster Harriers, Wellington Town, Beighton Miners Welfare, Gainsborough Trinity, Boston United, Hereford United, Selby Town, Peterborough United, Grays Athletic, Leytonstone, Great Yarmouth Town, Finchley, Tonbridge, Wimbledon, Hendon, Guildford City, Weymouth, Newport (IOW), Bath City, Yeovil Town and Llanelli.

Those advancing to the competition proper for the first time were Beighton Miners Welfare, Selby Town and Grays Athletic. Additionally, Hendon had not featured at this stage since 1934–35, Boston United had not done so since 1936-37 and Ashton United had not done so since 1887-88 when the club was still known as Hurst.

Finchley was the most successful club from the qualifying rounds this season, participating in seven rounds of the competition. They defeated Clapton, Woodford Town, Eton Manor, Chelmsford City, Kidderminster Harriers and Crystal Palace before going out in the third round to Shrewsbury Town.

== First round proper ==
At this stage the 48 clubs from the Football League Third Division North and South joined the 30 non-league clubs who came through the qualifying rounds. The final two non-league sides in the draw, Walthamstow Avenue and Leyton, were given byes to this round as the champions and runners-up from the previous season's FA Amateur Cup.

Matches were scheduled to be played on Saturday, 22 November 1952. Fourteen were drawn and went to replays, with two going on to second replays.

| Tie no | Home team | Score | Away team | Date |
|---|---|---|---|---|
| 1 | Chester | 0–1 | Hartlepools United | 22 November 1952 |
| 2 | Chesterfield | 1–0 | Workington | 22 November 1952 |
| 3 | Darlington | 2–3 | Grimsby Town | 22 November 1952 |
| 4 | Bath City | 3–1 | Southend United | 22 November 1952 |
| 5 | Tonbridge | 2–2 | Norwich City | 22 November 1952 |
| Replay | Norwich City | 1–0 | Tonbridge | 27 November 1952 |
| 6 | Weymouth | 1–1 | Colchester United | 22 November 1952 |
| Replay | Colchester United | 4–0 | Weymouth | 27 November 1952 |
| 7 | Yeovil Town | 1–4 | Brighton & Hove Albion | 22 November 1952 |
| 8 | Leyton | 0–0 | Hereford United | 22 November 1952 |
| Replay | Hereford United | 3–2 | Leyton | 27 November 1952 |
| 9 | Gainsborough Trinity | 1–1 | Netherfield (Kendal) | 22 November 1952 |
| Replay | Netherfield (Kendal) | 0–3 | Gainsborough Trinity | 27 November 1952 |
| 10 | Swindon Town | 5–0 | Newport (IOW) | 22 November 1952 |
| 11 | Scarborough | 0–8 | Mansfield Town | 22 November 1952 |
| 12 | Ipswich Town | 2–2 | Bournemouth & Boscombe Athletic | 22 November 1952 |
| Replay | Bournemouth & Boscombe Athletic | 2–2 | Ipswich Town | 26 November 1952 |
| Replay | Ipswich Town | 3–2 | Bournemouth & Boscombe Athletic | 1 December 1952 |
| 13 | Tranmere Rovers | 8–1 | Ashington | 22 November 1952 |
| 14 | Wellington Town | 1–1 | Gillingham | 22 November 1952 |
| Replay | Gillingham | 3–0 | Wellington Town | 26 November 1952 |
| 15 | Kidderminster Harriers | 0–1 | Finchley | 22 November 1952 |
| 16 | Queens Park Rangers | 2–2 | Shrewsbury Town | 22 November 1952 |
| Replay | Shrewsbury Town | 2–2 | Queens Park Rangers | 27 November 1952 |
| Replay | Queens Park Rangers | 1–4 | Shrewsbury Town | 1 December 1952 |
| 17 | Leytonstone | 0–2 | Watford | 22 November 1952 |
| 18 | Coventry City | 2–0 | Bristol City | 22 November 1952 |
| 19 | Bradford City | 4–0 | Rhyl | 22 November 1952 |
| 20 | Crystal Palace | 1–1 | Reading | 22 November 1952 |
| Replay | Reading | 1–3 | Crystal Palace | 26 November 1952 |
| 21 | Bradford Park Avenue | 2–1 | Rochdale | 22 November 1952 |
| 22 | Scunthorpe & Lindsey United | 1–0 | Carlisle United | 22 November 1952 |
| 23 | Grays Athletic | 0–5 | Llanelli | 22 November 1952 |
| 24 | Port Vale | 2–1 | Exeter City | 22 November 1952 |
| 25 | Halifax Town | 1–1 | Ashton United | 22 November 1952 |
| Replay | Ashton United | 1–2 | Halifax Town | 25 November 1952 |
| 26 | Newport County | 2–1 | Walsall | 22 November 1952 |
| 27 | Southport | 3–1 | Bangor City | 22 November 1952 |
| 28 | Selby Town | 1–5 | Bishop Auckland | 22 November 1952 |
| 29 | Walthamstow Avenue | 2–2 | Wimbledon | 22 November 1952 |
| Replay | Wimbledon | 0–3 | Walthamstow Avenue | 26 November 1952 |
| 30 | York City | 1–2 | Barrow | 22 November 1952 |
| 31 | Aldershot | 0–0 | Millwall | 22 November 1952 |
| Replay | Millwall | 7–1 | Aldershot | 27 November 1952 |
| 32 | Guildford City | 2–2 | Great Yarmouth Town | 22 November 1952 |
| Replay | Great Yarmouth Town | 1–0 | Guildford City | 27 November 1952 |
| 33 | Horden CW | 1–2 | Accrington Stanley | 22 November 1952 |
| 34 | Gateshead | 2–0 | Crewe Alexandra | 22 November 1952 |
| 35 | North Shields | 3–6 | Stockport County | 22 November 1952 |
| 36 | Boston United | 1–2 | Oldham Athletic | 22 November 1952 |
| 37 | Peterborough United | 2–1 | Torquay United | 22 November 1952 |
| 38 | Leyton Orient | 1–1 | Bristol Rovers | 22 November 1952 |
| Replay | Bristol Rovers | 1–0 | Leyton Orient | 24 November 1952 |
| 39 | Hendon | 0–0 | Northampton Town | 22 November 1952 |
| Replay | Northampton Town | 2–0 | Hendon | 27 November 1952 |
| 40 | Beighton Miners Welfare | 0–3 | Wrexham | 22 November 1952 |

== Second round proper ==
The matches were scheduled for Saturday, 6 December 1952, with Finchley and Crystal Palace (famously) competing on the 10th instead. Five matches were drawn, with replays taking place later the same week.

| Tie no | Home team | Score | Away team | Date |
|---|---|---|---|---|
| 1 | Barrow | 2–2 | Millwall | 6 December 1952 |
| Replay | Millwall | 4–1 | Barrow | 10 December 1952 |
| 2 | Finchley | 3–1 | Crystal Palace | 10 December 1952 |
| 3 | Grimsby Town | 1–0 | Bath City | 6 December 1952 |
| 4 | Swindon Town | 2–0 | Northampton Town | 6 December 1952 |
| 5 | Shrewsbury Town | 0–0 | Chesterfield | 6 December 1952 |
| Replay | Chesterfield | 2–4 | Shrewsbury Town | 10 December 1952 |
| 6 | Bishop Auckland | 1–4 | Coventry City | 6 December 1952 |
| 7 | Tranmere Rovers | 2–1 | Hartlepools United | 6 December 1952 |
| 8 | Stockport County | 3–1 | Gillingham | 6 December 1952 |
| 9 | Accrington Stanley | 0–2 | Mansfield Town | 6 December 1952 |
| 10 | Great Yarmouth Town | 1–2 | Wrexham | 6 December 1952 |
| 11 | Brighton & Hove Albion | 2–0 | Norwich City | 6 December 1952 |
| 12 | Bradford City | 1–1 | Ipswich Town | 6 December 1952 |
| Replay | Ipswich Town | 5–1 | Bradford City | 10 December 1952 |
| 13 | Bradford Park Avenue | 1–2 | Gateshead | 6 December 1952 |
| 14 | Port Vale | 0–3 | Oldham Athletic | 6 December 1952 |
| 15 | Halifax Town | 4–2 | Southport | 6 December 1952 |
| 16 | Newport County | 2–1 | Gainsborough Trinity | 6 December 1952 |
| 17 | Walthamstow Avenue | 1–1 | Watford | 6 December 1952 |
| Replay | Watford | 1–2 | Walthamstow Avenue | 10 December 1952 |
| 18 | Hereford United | 0–0 | Scunthorpe & Lindsey United | 6 December 1952 |
| Replay | Scunthorpe & Lindsey United | 2–1 | Hereford United | 11 December 1952 |
| 19 | Peterborough United | 0–1 | Bristol Rovers | 6 December 1952 |
| 20 | Colchester United | 3–2 | Llanelli | 6 December 1952 |

== Third round proper ==
The 44 First and Second Division clubs entered the competition at this stage.

The matches were scheduled for Saturday, 10 January 1953, although two matches were postponed until the mid-week fixtures. Six matches were drawn and went to replays. Finchley was the last club from the qualifying rounds remaining in the draw.

| Tie no | Home team | Score | Away team | Date |
|---|---|---|---|---|
| 1 | Preston North End | 5–2 | Wolverhampton Wanderers | 10 January 1953 |
| 2 | Leicester City | 2–4 | Notts County | 10 January 1953 |
| 3 | Aston Villa | 3–1 | Middlesbrough | 10 January 1953 |
| 4 | Sheffield Wednesday | 1–2 | Blackpool | 10 January 1953 |
| 5 | Bolton Wanderers | 3–1 | Fulham | 14 January 1953 |
| 6 | Grimsby Town | 1–3 | Bury | 10 January 1953 |
| 7 | Sunderland | 1–1 | Scunthorpe & Lindsey United | 10 January 1953 |
| Replay | Scunthorpe & Lindsey United | 1–2 | Sunderland | 15 January 1953 |
| 8 | Derby County | 4–4 | Chelsea | 10 January 1953 |
| Replay | Chelsea | 1–0 | Derby County | 14 January 1953 |
| 9 | Lincoln City | 1–1 | Southampton | 10 January 1953 |
| Replay | Southampton | 2–1 | Lincoln City | 14 January 1953 |
| 10 | Luton Town | 6–1 | Blackburn Rovers | 10 January 1953 |
| 11 | Everton | 3–2 | Ipswich Town | 10 January 1953 |
| 12 | Shrewsbury Town | 2–0 | Finchley | 10 January 1953 |
| 13 | Tranmere Rovers | 1–1 | Tottenham Hotspur | 10 January 1953 |
| Replay | Tottenham Hotspur | 9–1 | Tranmere Rovers | 12 January 1953 |
| 14 | Newcastle United | 3–0 | Swansea Town | 14 January 1953 |
| 15 | Manchester City | 7–0 | Swindon Town | 10 January 1953 |
| 16 | Barnsley | 4–3 | Brighton & Hove Albion | 10 January 1953 |
| 17 | Brentford | 2–1 | Leeds United | 10 January 1953 |
| 18 | Portsmouth | 1–1 | Burnley | 10 January 1953 |
| Replay | Burnley | 3–1 | Portsmouth | 13 January 1953 |
| 19 | West Ham United | 1–4 | West Bromwich Albion | 10 January 1953 |
| 20 | Plymouth Argyle | 4–1 | Coventry City | 10 January 1953 |
| 21 | Millwall | 0–1 | Manchester United | 10 January 1953 |
| 22 | Hull City | 3–1 | Charlton Athletic | 10 January 1953 |
| 23 | Oldham Athletic | 1–3 | Birmingham City | 10 January 1953 |
| 24 | Huddersfield Town | 2–0 | Bristol Rovers | 10 January 1953 |
| 25 | Mansfield Town | 0–1 | Nottingham Forest | 10 January 1953 |
| 26 | Halifax Town | 3–1 | Cardiff City | 10 January 1953 |
| 27 | Newport County | 1–4 | Sheffield United | 10 January 1953 |
| 28 | Arsenal | 4–0 | Doncaster Rovers | 10 January 1953 |
| 29 | Walthamstow Avenue | 2–1 | Stockport County | 10 January 1953 |
| 30 | Stoke City | 2–1 | Wrexham | 10 January 1953 |
| 31 | Rotherham United | 2–2 | Colchester United | 10 January 1953 |
| Replay | Colchester United | 0–2 | Rotherham United | 15 January 1953 |
| 32 | Gateshead | 1–0 | Liverpool | 10 January 1953 |

- The first match between Newcastle United and Swansea on the 10th of January was abandoned after only 8 minutes due to heavy fog. The match was rescheduled to the 14th of January.

== Fourth round proper ==
The matches were scheduled for Saturday, 31 January 1953. Seven matches were drawn and went to replays, which were all played in the following midweek match. Two matches then went to a second replay, with the Chelsea–West Bromwich Albion tie going to a third replay before it was settled. Walthamstow Avenue was the last non-league side left in the competition.

| Tie no | Home team | Score | Away team | Date |
|---|---|---|---|---|
| 1 | Blackpool | 1–0 | Huddersfield Town | 31 January 1953 |
| 2 | Burnley | 2–0 | Sunderland | 31 January 1953 |
| 3 | Preston North End | 2–2 | Tottenham Hotspur | 31 January 1953 |
| Replay | Tottenham Hotspur | 1–0 | Preston North End | 4 February 1953 |
| 4 | Aston Villa | 0–0 | Brentford | 31 January 1953 |
| Replay | Brentford | 1–2 | Aston Villa | 4 February 1953 |
| 5 | Bolton Wanderers | 1–1 | Notts County | 31 January 1953 |
| Replay | Notts County | 2–2 | Bolton Wanderers | 5 February 1953 |
| Replay | Bolton Wanderers | 1–0 | Notts County | 9 February 1953 |
| 6 | Everton | 4–1 | Nottingham Forest | 31 January 1953 |
| 7 | Shrewsbury Town | 1–4 | Southampton | 31 January 1953 |
| 8 | Sheffield United | 1–1 | Birmingham City | 31 January 1953 |
| Replay | Birmingham City | 3–1 | Sheffield United | 4 February 1953 |
| 9 | Newcastle United | 1–3 | Rotherham United | 31 January 1953 |
| 10 | Manchester City | 1–1 | Luton Town | 31 January 1953 |
| Replay | Luton Town | 5–1 | Manchester City | 4 February 1953 |
| 11 | Manchester United | 1–1 | Walthamstow Avenue | 31 January 1953 |
| Replay | Walthamstow Avenue | 2–5 | Manchester United | 5 February 1953 |
| 12 | Plymouth Argyle | 1–0 | Barnsley | 31 January 1953 |
| 13 | Hull City | 1–2 | Gateshead | 31 January 1953 |
| 14 | Chelsea | 1–1 | West Bromwich Albion | 31 January 1953 |
| Replay | West Bromwich Albion | 0–0 | Chelsea | 4 February 1953 |
| Replay | Chelsea | 1–1 | West Bromwich Albion | 9 February 1953 |
| Replay | West Bromwich Albion | 0–4 | Chelsea | 11 February 1953 |
| 15 | Halifax Town | 1–0 | Stoke City | 31 January 1953 |
| 16 | Arsenal | 6–2 | Bury | 31 January 1953 |

== Fifth round proper ==
The matches were scheduled for Saturday, 14 February 1953. The Blackpool–Southampton game went to a replay.

| Tie no | Home team | Score | Away team | Date |
|---|---|---|---|---|
| 1 | Blackpool | 1–1 | Southampton | 14 February 1953 |
| Replay | Southampton | 1–2 | Blackpool | 18 February 1953 |
| 2 | Burnley | 0–2 | Arsenal | 14 February 1953 |
| 3 | Luton Town | 0–1 | Bolton Wanderers | 14 February 1953 |
| 4 | Everton | 2–1 | Manchester United | 14 February 1953 |
| 5 | Plymouth Argyle | 0–1 | Gateshead | 14 February 1953 |
| 6 | Chelsea | 0–4 | Birmingham City | 14 February 1953 |
| 7 | Halifax Town | 0–3 | Tottenham Hotspur | 14 February 1953 |
| 8 | Rotherham United | 1–3 | Aston Villa | 14 February 1953 |

== Sixth round proper ==
The four quarter-final ties were scheduled to be played on Saturday, 28 February 1953. The Birmingham City–Tottenham Hotspur game went to two replays before it was settled.

| Tie no | Home team | Score | Away team | Date |
|---|---|---|---|---|
| 1 | Aston Villa | 0–1 | Everton | 28 February 1953 |
| 2 | Arsenal | 1–2 | Blackpool | 28 February 1953 |
| 3 | Gateshead | 0–1 | Bolton Wanderers | 28 February 1953 |
| 4 | Birmingham City | 1–1 | Tottenham Hotspur | 28 February 1953 |
| Replay | Tottenham Hotspur | 2–2 | Birmingham City | 4 March 1953 |
| Replay | Birmingham City | 0–1 | Tottenham Hotspur | 9 March 1953 |

== Semi-finals ==
The semi-final matches were played on Saturday, 21 March 1953. Blackpool and Bolton Wanderers won their ties to meet in the final at Wembley.

21 March 1953
15:00

| Blackpool | 2–1 | Tottenham Hotspur |

Villa Park, Birmingham

21 March 1953
15:00

| Bolton Wanderers | 4–3 | Everton |

Maine Road, Manchester

== Final ==
The 1953 FA Cup Final, known as the "Matthews Final" due to Stanley Matthews' dribbling in the last 30 minutes of the game, was contested by Blackpool and Bolton Wanderers at Wembley. Blackpool won 4–3, with Stan Mortensen the third player to score an FA Cup Final hat-trick.

2 May 1953

| Blackpool | 4–3 | Bolton Wanderers |
|---|---|---|
| Mortensen 35', 68', 89'; Perry 90+2' | Report | Lofthouse 2'; Moir 40'; Bell 55' |

Wembley Stadium, London
Attendance: 100,000
Referee: B. M. Griffiths (Newport)

| Blackpool | Bolton Wanderers |

== See also ==
- FA Cup Final Results 1872—
