= 1946–47 Arsenal F.C. season =

English football club season

Arsenal
1946–47 season
- Chairman: Samuel Hill-Wood
- Manager: George Allison (until 31 May 1947); Tom Whittaker (from 2 June 1947)
- Division One: 13th
- FA Cup: Third round
- Top goalscorer: League: Reg Lewis (29); All: Reg Lewis (29)
- Highest home attendance: 60,643 v Derby County (21 September 1946)
- Lowest home attendance: 23,785 v Everton (31 May 1947)
Home colours	Away colours

The 1946–47 season was Arsenal Football Club's 21st consecutive season in the top flight of English football.

In 1946 the Football League in the United Kingdom fully resumed on a national basis following the disruption caused by World War II. In the club's first post-war First Division match, on 31 August 1946; Arsenal lost 6–1 to Wolves, their biggest League defeat in nearly twenty years. Although the Gunners had been the dominant force in English football in the 1930s, they struggled in their first season after the war, escaping relegation and finishing 13th. They were knocked out of the FA Cup by Chelsea in the third round after two replays.

It was George Allison's last season as manager for Arsenal. Tom Whittaker, his assistant, succeeded him as manager.

== Players ==
Players returning after the break included Cliff Bastin, Bryn Jones, Reg Lewis, Jimmy Logie, George Male, David Nelson and Laurie Scott. George Swindin established himself as Arsenal's undisputed No. 1, a position he would hold for the next six seasons. The squad included brothers Leslie Compton and Denis Compton both of whom also played Cricket for Middlesex. Ian McPherson made his Arsenal debut in the opening match against Wolves. He played 40 times that season on the right wing.

Due to Arsenal's wartime move to White Hart Lane and the War itself, there was little young talent available to the club on short-notice.. Arsenal found solutions in players like the amateur Albert Guðmundsson, later Iceland's Minister of Finance. Dr. Kevin O'Flanagan made 14 First Division appearances and scored three goals. He made his first-class league debut against Blackburn Rovers on 4 September and his last appearance for the senior team came on 28 December 1946 against Wolves. Bernard Joy played the first half of the 1946–47 season before deciding that his age (35) was counting against him; he retired from top-flight football in December 1946. George Curtis played 12 times in the 1946–47 season, but was sold to Southampton in part-exchange for Don Roper in summer 1947.

Joe Mercer, near retirement from football to concentrate on his grocery business, made his Arsenal debut against Bolton Wanderers on 30 November 1946 and soon after became club captain. Everton boss Theo Kelly had brought Mercer's boots to the transfer negotiations to prevent Mercer having a reason to go back to say goodbye to the other players at Everton. His transfer fee was set at £9,000 (2015: £236,000) and he remained in Liverpool to live and train.

Arsenal were unsuccessful in their attempts to land Archie Macaulay, who signed with Brentford F.C. in October 1946.

Despite being nearly 35 and having never played in the top flight, Ronnie Rooke was signed by Arsenal (Cyril Grant going in the other direction). The move was surprising, but Rooke immediately made an impact, scoring the winner on his debut against Charlton Athletic on 14 December. He scored 21 goals in just 24 League matches that season.

The season marked the last for Cliff Bastin, who played just six league matches of the season and required a major ear operation in April, and for manager George Allison who had been involved with the club for four decades who announced his retirement in May.

== Matches ==
Arsenal began the season with a 6-1 loss to Wolves, their biggest defeat in nearly 20 years.Their home season began on 4 September against Blackburn Rovers. On 21 September 63,000 attended Highbury to see Arsenal beaten by Derby County.

Czech Champions, AC Sparta opened their tour of Britain with a 2–2 draw against Arsenal on 2 October with Albert Guðmundsson, later Iceland's Minister of Finance, playing inside forward for The Gunners.

Despite leading at half time, Arsenal lost to Sheffield United in early November. Six changes were made for the match against Preston North End the following week: Walley Barnes replaced Joy at left back. With Jones still injured, Lewis was moved to inside forward and Cyril Grant made his Arsenal debut as centre forward. However, the poor form continued and Arsenal lost 2–0.

Each November between 1930 and 1962, Racing Club de Paris hosted a prestige game with Arsenal. In 1946 The London club were beaten 2–1 at Colombes Stadium. In mid November they beat Oxford University 6–0 with goals by Doug Farquhar, Morgan (2) and Whalley (3).

== Results ==
Arsenal's score comes first

https://www.11v11.com/teams/arsenal/tab/matches/season/1947/

=== Legend ===
Win	Draw	Loss

=== Football League First Division ===
Date	Opponent	Venue	Result	Attendance	Scorers
31 August 1946	Wolverhampton Wanderers	A	1–6	50,845	Lewis
4 September 1946	Blackburn Rovers	H	1–3	28,700	Lewis
7 September 1946	Sunderland	H	2–2	53,377	Lewis (2)
11 September 1946	Everton	A	2–3	40,000	Lewis (2)
14 September 1946	Aston Villa	A	2–0	53,778	Lewis, O'Flanagan
17 September 1946	Blackburn Rovers	A	2–1	24,563	Lewis (2)
21 September 1946	Derby County	H	0–1	60,643	
28 September 1946	Manchester United	A	2–5	62,718	Lewis, McPherson
5 October 1946	Blackpool	A	1–2	24,039	Logie
12 October 1946	Brentford	H	2–2	45,000	Lewis, Logie
19 October 1946	Stoke City	H	1–0	60,266	O'Flanagan
26 October 1946	Chelsea	A	1–2	56,568	Lewis
2 November 1946	Sheffield United	H	2–3	41,173	Lewis, Logie
9 November 1946	Preston North End	A	0–2	29,971	
16 November 1946	Leeds United	H	4–2	36,377	Lewis (2 including 1 penalty), Logie, McPherson
23 November 1946	Liverpool	A	2–4	51,435	Lewis, Logie
30 November 1946	Bolton Wanderers	H	2–2	42,522	Lewis (penalty), O'Flanagan
7 December 1946	Middlesbrough	A	0–2	30,357	
14 December 1946	Charlton Athletic	H	1–0	38,606	Rooke
21 December 1946	Grimsby Town	A	0–0	13,308	
25 December 1946	Portsmouth	H	2–1	32,108	Rooke, Logie
26 December 1946	Portsmouth	A	2–0	38,000	Rooke (2)
28 December 1946	Wolverhampton Wanderers	H	1–1	58,075	Rooke
4 January 1947	Sunderland	A	4–1	36,812	Rooke (2), Lewis (2)
18 January 1947	Aston Villa	H	0–2	57,524	
1 February 1947	Manchester United	H	6–2	29,145	Rooke (3), Rudkin, Logie, McPherson
8 February 1947	Blackpool	H	1–1	31,111	Rooke
22 February 1947	Stoke City	A	1–3	30,000	Rooke
1 March 1947	Chelsea	H	1–2	52,606	Rudkin
15 March 1947	Preston North End	H	4–1	45,775	Lewis (3), Rooke
22 March 1947	Leeds United	A	1–1	32,000	Lewis
4 April 1947	Huddersfield Town	H	1–2	46,105	Jones
5 April 1947	Bolton Wanderers	A	3–1	34,398	Rooke (2), Lewis
7 April 1947	Huddersfield Town	A	0–0	33,381	
12 April 1947	Middlesbrough	H	4–0	44,230	Rooke (4 including 1 penalty)
19 April 1947	Charlton Athletic	A	2–2	57.983	McPherson, Logie
26 April 1947	Grimsby Town	H	5–3	42,100	Lewis 4, Compton
10 May 1947	Derby County	A	1–0	19,153	Rooke
24 May 1947	Liverpool	H	1–2	44,265	McPherson
26 May 1947	Brentford	A	1–0	17,599	Sloan
31 May 1947	Everton	H]	2–1	23,785	Lewis, Rooke
7 June 1947	Sheffield United	H	1–2	14,939	McPherson

==== Final League table ====
Pos	Team	Pld	W	D	L	GF	GA	GAv	Pts
11	Middlesbrough	42	17	8	17	73	68	1.074	42
12	Portsmouth	42	16	9	17	66	60	1.100	41
13	Arsenal	42	16	9	17	72	70	1.029	41
14	Derby County	42	18	5	19	73	79	0.924	41
15	Chelsea	42	16	7	19	69	84	0.821	39

Source: World Football
Rules for classification: 1) Points; 2) Goal average; 3) Goals scored

Date	Opponent	Venue	Result	Score F–A	Scorer(s)	Attendance
12 April 1947	Middlesbrough	H	W	4–0	Rooke (4) (1 pen.)	44,230
19 April 1947	Charlton Athletic	A	D	2–2	McPherson, Logie	57,983
26 April 1947	Grimsby Town	H	W	5–3	Lewis (4), D. Compton	42,100
10 May 1947	Derby County	A	W	1–0	Rooke	19,153
24 May 1947	Liverpool	H	L	1–2	McPherson	44,265
26 May 1947	Brentford	A	W	1–0	Sloan	17,599
31 May 1947	Everton	H	W	2–1	Rooke, Lewis	23,785
7 June 1947	Sheffield United	A	L	1–2	McPherson	14,939

Season	League									Top scorer	
Season	Division	P	W	D	L	F	A	Pts	Pos	Top scorer	
1946–47	Div 1	42	16	9	17	72	70	41	13th	Reg Lewis	29

=== Results by round ===
Round	1	2	3	4	5	6	7	8	9	10	11	12	13	14	15	16	17	18	19	20	21	22	23	24	25	26	27	28	29	30	31	32	33	34	35	36	37	38	39	40	41	42
Ground	A	H	H	A	A	A	H	A	A	H	H	A	H	A	H	A	H	A	H	A	H	A	H	A	H	H	H	A	H	H	A	H	A	A	H	A	H	A	H	A	H	A
Result	L	L	D	L	W	W	L	L	L	D	W	L	L	L	W	L	D	L	W	D	W	W	D	W	L	W	D	L	L	W	D	L	W	D	W	D	W	W	L	W	W	L
Position	19	20	21	22	17	16	17	18	21	20	18	19	20	21	19	21	21	21	20	17	17	16	16	13	15	15	16	17	18	17	17	18	18	18	15	16	15	15	16	13	13	13

Source: Statto
A = Away; H = Home; W = Win; D = Draw; L = Loss

=== FA Cup ===
Round	Date	Opponent	Venue	Result	Attendance	Goalscorers
R3	11 January 1947	Chelsea	A	1–1	70,195	McPherson
R3 R	15 January 1947	Chelsea	H	1–1 (aet)	53,350	Rooke
R3 2R	20 January 1947	Chelsea	N	0–2	59,590	

== Player statistics ==
Players with name struck through and marked † left the club during the playing season.

Pos.	Nat.	Name	First Division		FA Cup		Total	
Pos.	Nat.	Name	Apps	Goals	Apps	Goals	Apps	Goals
DF	WAL	Walley Barnes	26	0	3	0	29	0
FW	ENG	~~Cliff Bastin~~ †	6	0	—	—	6	0
FW	ENG	Alf Calverley	11	0	—	—	11	0
MF	ENG	Ernie Collett	6	0	—	—	6	0
DF	ENG	Leslie Compton	36	0	3	0	39	0
FW	ENG	Denis Compton	1	1	—	—	1	1
FW	ENG	George Curtis	11	0	1	—	12	0
FW	ENG	~~George Drury~~ †	4	0	—	—	4	0
DF	ENG	Alf Fields	8	0	—	—	8	0
FW	ENG	~~Cyril Grant~~ †	2	0	—	—	2	0
FW	ISL	~~Albert Guðmundsson~~ †	2	0	—	—	2	0
FW	ENG	~~Cyril Hodges~~ †	2	0	—	—	2	0
FW	WAL	Bryn Jones	26	1	2	0	28	1
DF	ENG	~~Bernard Joy~~ †	13	0	—	—	13	0
FW	ENG	Reg Lewis	28	29	3	0	31	29
FW	SCO	Jimmy Logie	35	8	3	0	38	8
DF	ENG	George Male	15	0	2	0	17	0
MF	SCO	Ian McPherson	37	6	3	1	40	7
DF	ENG	Joe Mercer	25	0	3	0	28	0
FW	WAL	Stan Morgan	2	0	—	—	2	0
MF	ENG	~~David Nelson~~ †	10	0	—	—	10	0
FW	IRE; IRE	Kevin O'Flanagan	14	3	—	—	14	3
GK	ENG	Ted Platt	4	0	—	—	4	0
FW	ENG	Ronnie Rooke	24	21	3	1	27	22
FW	ENG	Tommy Rudkin	5	2	—	—	5	2
DF	ENG	Laurie Scott	28	0	1	0	29	0
DF	IRE; IRE	Paddy Sloan	30	1	3	0	33	1
FW	ENG	~~Alan Smith~~ †	3	0	—	—	3	0
GK	ENG	George Swindin	38	0	3	0	41	0
DF	ENG	Joe Wade	2	0	—	—	2	0
DF	ENG	Harry Waller	8	0	—	—	8	0
