= Don Roper =

English footballer

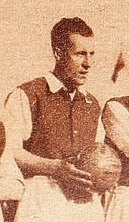

Personal information
- Full name: Donald George Beaumont Roper
- Date of birth: 14 December 1922
- Place of birth: Botley, Hampshire, England
- Date of death: 8 June 2001 (aged 78)
- Place of death: Southampton, Hampshire, England
- Height: 5 ft 9 in (1.75 m)
- Positions: Centre forward; winger

Youth career
- ?: Bitterne Nomads
- 1940: Eastleigh

Senior career*
Years	Team	Apps	(Gls)
1940–1947	Southampton	40	(8)
1947–1957	Arsenal	297	(88)
1957–1959	Southampton	80	(32)
1959–1960	Weymouth	33	(10)
1960–1963	Dorchester Town	103	(31)

International career
1953	England B	1	(0)
- Cricket career
Cricket information
- Batting: Right-handed
Domestic team information
- Years: Team
- 1947: Hampshire
Career statistics
Competition	First-class
Matches	1
Runs scored	30
Batting average	15.00
100s/50s	–/–
Top score	30
Catches/stumpings	–/–
- Source: Don Roper at Cricinfo
- * Club domestic league appearances and goals

Donald George Beaumont Roper (14 December 1922 – 8 June 2001) was an English footballer who played for Southampton and Arsenal, winning two league titles with the latter in the 1947–48 and 1952–53 seasons. Playing as a winger, he made nearly 300 appearances for Arsenal, scoring 88 goals. In addition to playing association football, Roper also made one appearance in first-class cricket for Hampshire in 1947.

== Sporting career ==
=== Football ===
Roper was born in December 1922 at Botley, Hampshire. He was a prolific schoolboy footballer, who played for Hedge End at youth level and played his early league football for Bitterne Nomads in the Hampshire League. It was while playing for Bitterne Nomads what he was scouted by Toby Keleher, assistant manager to Tom Parker, and in July 1940 was persuaded to sign for his local club, Southampton, making his debut for them during wartime matches. During the war, he was employed in Southampton at the Supermarine factory, where he helped to manufacture the Spitfire. During the war, he was Southampton's leading goalscorer in wartime competitions, having formed a successful strike partnership with Ted Bates. Against Arsenal in 1944, his performance in a 4–2 victory was described as "remarkable", with then Arsenal manager George Allison monitoring his development as a player. By the resumption of competitive football in 1946, Roper had established himself as a "two-footed powerful (right) winger" in the Football League Second Division.

After impressing in the Second Division in 1946–47, he was signed by Arsenal in the close season by Allison's successor Tom Whittaker (who had watched Roper at The Dell eleven times during that season) for £12,000, plus George Curtis and Tom Rudkin moving in the opposite direction, an estimated total fee of £24,000. His move to Arsenal was described as "one of the most drawn-out and delicate deals in the history of football transfers". Roper immediately became a regular for Arsenal, playing 40 times and scoring ten goals in 1947–48, as Arsenal won the First Division. He formed partnerships with Archie Macaulay and Ronnie Rooke, with Arsenal's success being in stark contrast to their previous season, in which they had avoided relegation. He switched to the left wing in 1949–50, but was displaced by both Denis Compton and Freddie Cox in Arsenal's FA Cup-winning side of 1950. The loss of his first-team place proved to be temporary, with him regaining his place in the Arsenal side from the 1950–51 season.

After a strong start in the 1950–51 season, where Arsenal competed with Newcastle United for the league leadership in the opening weeks of the season, their season fell away. This was attributed to problems on the Arsenal wings, with Compton having given up playing, Ian McPherson being less effective, and Roper losing speed due to an increase in his weight; Roper built a reputation for his "gargantuan appetite" at Highbury. He later played in Arsenal's 1952 FA Cup final defeat to Newcastle United, although in that match he was forced to deputise for full back Walley Barnes after Barnes was stretchered off with an injury, with his performance in the match being described as "outstanding". During the 1952–53 season, Roper enjoyed one of his finest seasons, winning another League title, in which he scored 14 goals in 41 appearances. Earlier in the season, in a friendly match against Hibernian, he scored 5 times; the match was one of the first in the country to be played under floodlights and televised in the evening. Roper's performances during that season earned him an England B cap against Scotland B, although he never played for the full England side. He played for another two seasons as a first-team regular, but lost his Arsenal first-team place during 1955–56, dropping to the reserves. He played 321 matches for Arsenal in total, scoring 95 goals in league and cup competitions.

Roper rejoined former club Southampton who were now in the Third Division (South), in January 1957. He went on to become club captain, playing alongside star player Derek Reeves and the young Terry Paine. At the end of the 1958–59 season, Roper fell out with the club over terms and alleged promises from Ted Bates that he would be given post-playing employment as a club trainer. He left holding a grudge that he never overcame, refusing to attend any club reunions or even to visit The Dell. In 1993, he was visited by Bill Stroud who attempted to persuade Roper, in vain, to forgo his grudge against Bates and attend his 75th birthday celebrations. During his second spell at Southampton, he played in 80 matches and scored 32 goals. He finished his career by playing for Weymouth under the management of Arthur Coles during the 1959–60 season, and Dorchester Town from the 1960–61 season. He retired in 1963, having made 103 appearances for Dorchester Town, scoring 31 goals.

=== Cricket ===
Described by Wisden as a "useful middle order batsman", Roper made a single appearance as an amateur in first-class cricket for Hampshire against Cambridge University at Portsmouth in 1947. Batting twice in the match, he was dismissed in Hampshire's first innings for 30 runs by Michael Mills, while in their second innings he was dismissed without scoring by Guy Willatt. After joining Arsenal, he played club cricket in London for Southgate Cricket Club.

== Later life and death ==
After retiring from football, he settled in Southampton and worked as an engineer in the aviation industry, before working for a local engineering firm which went out of business in the 1980s, forcing him into an early retirement. In his latter years, he was afflicted by Parkinson's disease, succumbing to the disease at Southampton in June 2001, at the age of 78. He was survived by his wife, Joyce, and their two sons.

== Honours ==
Arsenal

- Football League First Division: 1947–48, 1952–53
- FA Charity Shield: 1948, 1953
- FA Cup runner-up: 1951–52
