= 1947–48 Arsenal F.C. season =

English football club season

Arsenal
1947–48 season
- Chairman: Samuel Hill-Wood
- Manager: Tom Whittaker
- Stadium: Highbury
- First Division: 1st
- FA Cup: Third Round
- Top goalscorer: Ronnie Rooke (33)
Home colours	Away colours

The 1947–48 season was Arsenal Football Club's 22nd consecutive season in the top flight of English football. Having avoided relegation the previous season, Arsenal returned to their winning ways of the 1930s by winning the league title. Arsenal finished seven points ahead of title rivals Manchester United and Burnley.

Tom Whittaker won the league in his first season as manager but was unable to lift the FA Cup. The Gunners went out to lower-league Bradford Park Avenue in the third round.

== Season summary ==
Joe Shaw returned from Chelsea to serve as Tom Whittaker's right-hand man in his first full season as manager. Arsenal made two new signings: Scottish international Archie Macauly from Brentford (whom Arsenal had unsuccessfully pursued a year prior) and Don Roper from Southampton.

Arsenal began the season at home to Sunderland. Defender Joe Mercer served as captain as Les Compton was caught up with cricket responsibilities at Middlesex. Finally back at Highbury after it had been used for Air Raid Precautions during World War II, the pitch was reseeded and the track had been resurfaced. Arsenal won their first match 3-1, scoring thrice in the first fifteen minutes of the second half. The team then headed to Charlton, the FA Cup holders, and won 4-2, before demolishing them 6-0 at home a few weeks later. After beating Manchester United 2-1 at home and then extending their run of victories to six with a 2-0 win over Bolton, injuries began to set in. Les Compton returned to strengthen the team, insisting Mercer remained captain. Arsenal fell into a slump in which goals were difficult to come by.

Post-war match attendances soared. Arsenal played in front of a crowd of 67,277 at Stamford Bridge. 27,000 watched the reserve game between Arsenal and Chelsea that same afternoon. Arsenal beat 4-3 to Racing Club in Paris in a traditional international friendly and then returned to league play. They remained unbeaten in the league until the end of November when they lost 1-0 away at Derby.

On New Year's Day, Arsenal were five points clear at the top of the table after beating Bolton 1-0 on a snowmelt sodden pitch. Such highs were immediately contrasted by Arsenal's entrance into the FA Cup. Facing second-division Bradford Park Avenue, Arsenal found little success and went out of the Cup in their first game, losing 1-0. Arsenal then traveled to Manchester United, still playing their home matches at Maine Road due to wartime damage to Old Trafford, and tied in front of a then-record crowd of 83,260.

Denis Compton, returning from a knee surgery, was recalled into the side in place of the injured Ian McPherson. Playing Burnley at home on Valentine's Day, Compton assisted the first goal fourteen minutes into the match, helping Arsenal to a 3-0 victory. Fielding one of the oldest sides in the competition, Arsenal held an eight-point advantage over the rest of the league.

Whittaker brought in Cliff Holton, Peter Goring, and Alex Forbes mid-season to help strengthen the Arsenal side. Forbes, bought for £12,000 from Sheffield United, scored eight minutes into his debut at Wolves. Whittaker had convinced him to come to the club by sending Macauly to convince him when Forbes had been laid up in the hospital, recovering from appendicitis.

Arsenal had lost only thrice in their first thirty two games. However, Arsenal followed up such fine form with two losses in their next three matches, losing 2-0 to Chelsea at home and 3-0 away at Blackpool. Several ties and one more loss were to follow. However, Arsenal won the league with a 1–1 draw at Huddersfield Town, and after discovering that United and Burnley had lost via the newspapers at Doncaster Station on the journey, knew that they had won the league. They finished the season seven points ahead of their nearest rivals, Manchester United. It was Arsenal's sixth league title.

Over the course of the season Arsenal claimed some big wins, beating Charlton Athletic and Middlesbrough 6-0 and 7-0 respectively, and hammering bottom club Grimsby Town 8–0 on the final day, with Ronnie Rooke netting four times to bring his final tally for the league season to 33 in 42 Division 1 matches, thus becoming the second Arsenal player-after Ted Drake in 1934–35 to win the Golden Boot. Rooke, who played in every match of the season, was 36 at the time.

Goalkeeper George Swindin conceded only 32 goals. A reliable "retreating defense" was essential to Arsenal's season-long success. Arsenal would leave the ball with the opposition and back off, packing the defense. Few teams could get through with only Derby County doing the double over Arsenal.

== Results ==
Arsenal's score comes first

=== Legend ===
Win	Draw	Loss

=== Football League First Division ===
Date	Opponent	Venue	Result	Attendance	Scorers
23 August 1947	Sunderland	H	3–1	58,184	Logie, Rooke, McPherson
27 August 1947	Charlton Athletic	A	4–2	60,323	Roper, Logie, Lewis, McPherson
30 August 1947	Sheffield United	A	2–1	39,123	Roper, Rooke
3 September 1947	Charlton Athletic	H	6–0	54,684	Lewis 4, Rooke 2
6 September 1947	Manchester United	H	2–1	64,905	Lewis, Rooke
10 September 1947	Bolton Wanderers	H	2–0	46,969	Rooke(pen), McPherson
13 September 1947	Preston North End	A	0–0	40,060	
20 September 1947	Stoke City	H	3–0	61,579	Logie, McPherson 2
27 September 1947	Burnley	A	1–0	46,568	Lewis
4 October 1947	Portsmouth	H	0–0	62,461	
11 October 1947	Aston Villa	H	1–0	60,427	Rooke
18 October 1947	Wolverhampton Wanderers	A	1–1	55,998	Rooke(pen)
25 October 1947	Everton	H	1–1	56,645	Lewis
1 November 1947	Chelsea	A	0–0	67,277	
8 November 1947	Blackpool	H	2–1	67,057	Roper, Rooke(pen)
15 November 1947	Blackburn Rovers	A	1–0	37,447	Rooke
22 November 1947	Huddersfield Town	H	2–0	47,514	Rooke, Logie
29 November 1947	Derby County	A	0–1	35,713	
6 December 1947	Manchester City	H	1–1	41,274	Rooke(pen)
13 December 1947	Grimsby Town	A	4–0	18,700	Roper, Logie, Rooke 2
20 December 1947	Sunderland	A	1–1	58,397	Jones
25 December 1947	Liverpool	A	3–1	53,604	Roper, Rooke 2
27 December 1947	Liverpool	H	1–2	56,650	Lewis
1 January 1948	Bolton Wanderers	A	1–0	30,028	Lewis
3 January 1948	Sheffield United	H	3–2	48,993	Lewis, Rooke 2
17 January 1948	Manchester United	A	1–1	83,260	Lewis
31 January 1948	Preston North End	H	3–0	63,132	Rooke, Lewis 2
7 February 1948	Stoke City	A	0–0	44,836	
14 February 1948	Burnley	H	3–0	62,125	Roper, Rooke 2
28 February 1948	Aston Villa	A	2–4	68,690	Rooke, Moss(og)
6 March 1948	Wolverhampton Wanderers	H	5–2	57,711	Roper, Logie, Rooke 2, Forbes
13 March 1948	Everton	A	2–0	64,059	D.Compton 2
20 March 1948	Chelsea	H	0–2	56,596	
26 March 1948	Middlesbrough	H	7–0	57,557	Roper, Rooke 3, D.Compton 2, Robinson(og)
27 March 1948	Blackpool	A	0–3	32,678	
29 March 1948	Middlesbrough	A	1–1	38,249	Rooke
3 April 1948	Blackburn Rovers	H	2–0	45,801	Logie, Rooke
10 April 1948	Huddersfield Town	A	1–1	38,110	Roper
17 April 1948	Derby County	H	1–2	49,677	Roper
21 April 1948	Portsmouth	A	0–0	42,250	
24 April 1948	Manchester City	A	0–0	23,391	
1 May 1948	Grimsby Town	H	8–0	34,644	Logie(pen), Rooke 4, Forbes, D.Compton 2

==== Final League table ====
Pos	Team	Pld	W	D	L	GF	GA	GAv	Pts
1	Arsenal (C)	42	23	13	6	81	32	2.531	59
2	Manchester United	42	19	14	9	81	48	1.688	52
3	Burnley	42	20	12	10	56	43	1.302	52
4	Derby County	42	19	12	11	77	57	1.351	50
5	Wolverhampton Wanderers	42	19	9	14	83	70	1.186	47

Source: World Football
Rules for classification: 1) Points; 2) Goal average; 3) Goals scored
(C) Champions

=== FA Cup ===
Arsenal entered the FA Cup in the third round, in which they were drawn to face Bradford Park Avenue.

Round	Date	Opponent	Venue	Result	Attendance	Goalscorers
R3	10 January 1948	Bradford Park Avenue	H	0–1	47,738	

== See also ==
- 1947–48 in English football
- List of Arsenal F.C. seasons
