= 1949–50 Arsenal F.C. season =

English football club season

Arsenal
1949–50 season
- Chairman: Bracewell Smith
- Manager: Tom Whittaker
- Stadium: Highbury
- First Division: 6th
- FA Cup: Winners
Home colours	Away colours

The 1949–50 season was Arsenal Football Club's 24th consecutive season in the top flight of English football. They would finish sixth in the league but only four points off champions Portsmouth, with Peter Goring top scoring with 21 Division 1 goals, with Joe Mercer winning the FWA Player of the Year. That season, Arsenal would first have their new crest—emblazoned with the motto "Victoria Concordia Crescit" ("Victory Grows Through Harmony")—used on official club publications. In the FA Cup, Arsenal won the first four ties at Highbury before beating Chelsea after a replay to set up a final against Liverpool. The Gunners would dominate the final and win 2–0 thanks to Reg Lewis' double, his fourth and fifth FA Cup goals that season, as Arsenal claimed the cup for the third time in their history—having played every match in London. The club's biggest win in all competitions was 6–0 against Sunderland in the league; in all competitions, Reg Lewis scored the most goals, netting 24.

== Results ==
Arsenal's score comes first

=== Legend ===
Win	Draw	Loss

=== Football League First Division ===
Date	Opponent	Venue	Result	Attendance	Scorers
20 August 1949	Burnley	H	0–1	47,797	
24 August 1949	Chelsea	A	2–1	62,392	
27 August 1949	Sunderland	A	2–4	56,504	
31 August 1949	Chelsea	H	2–3	52,901	
3 September 1949	Liverpool	H	1–2	51,866	
7 September 1949	West Bromwich Albion	A	2–1	49,663	
10 September 1949	Huddersfield Town	A	2–2	20,822	
14 September 1949	West Bromwich Albion	H	4–1	46,755	
17 September 1949	Bolton Wanderers	A	2–2	33,867	
24 September 1949	Birmingham City	H	4–2	50,850	
1 October 1949	Derby County	H	2–1	30,417	
8 October 1949	Everton	H	5–2	53,224	
15 October 1949	Middlesbrough	A	1–1	36,221	
22 October 1949	Blackpool	H	1–0	66,391	
29 October 1949	Newcastle United	A	3–0	54,670	
5 November 1949	Fulham	H	2–1	40,593	
12 November 1949	Manchester City	A	2–0	28,404	
19 November 1949	Charlton Athletic	H	2–3	57,318	
26 November 1949	Aston Villa	A	1–1	45,863	
3 December 1949	Wolverhampton Wanderers	H	1–1	56,227	
10 December 1949	Portsmouth	A	1–2	39,027	
17 December 1949	Burnley	A	0–0	25,651	
24 December 1949	Sunderland	H	5–0	43,249	
26 December 1949	Manchester United	A	0–2	55,757	
27 December 1949	Manchester United	H	0–0	65,133	
31 December 1949	Liverpool	A	0–2	55,020	
14 January 1950	Huddersfield Town	H	1–0	46,815	
21 January 1950	Bolton Wanderers	H	1–1	47,493	
4 February 1950	Birmingham City	A	1–2	34,031	
18 February 1950	Derby County	H	1–0	67,445	
25 February 1950	Everton	A	1–0	43,632	
8 March 1950	Middlesbrough	H	1–1	34,464	
11 March 1950	Charlton Athletic	A	1–1	51,615	
25 March 1950	Fulham	A	2–2	35,703	
29 March 1950	Aston Villa	H	1–3	24,736	
1 April 1950	Manchester City	H	4–1	39,420	
8 April 1950	Blackpool	A	1–2	32,022	
10 April 1950	Stoke City	H	6–0	27,226	
15 April 1950	Newcastle United	H	4–2	51,997	
22 April 1950	Wolverhampton Wanderers	A	0–3	53,082	
3 May 1950	Portsmouth	H	2–0	63,124	
6 May 1950	Stoke City	A	5–2	22,689	

==== Final League table ====
Pos	Team	Pld	W	D	L	GF	GA	GAv	Pts
4	Manchester United	42	18	14	10	69	44	1.568	50
5	Newcastle United	42	19	12	11	77	55	1.400	50
6	Arsenal	42	19	11	12	79	55	1.436	49
7	Blackpool	42	17	15	10	46	35	1.314	49
8	Liverpool	42	17	14	11	64	54	1.185	48

Source: World Football
Rules for classification: 1) Points; 2) Goal average; 3) Goals scored

=== FA Cup ===
Arsenal entered the FA Cup in the third round, in which they were drawn to face Sheffield Wednesday.

Round	Date	Opponent	Venue	Result	Attendance	Goalscorers
R3	7 January 1950	Sheffield Wednesday	H	1–0	54,193	Lewis
R4	28 January 1950	Swansea Town	H	2–1	57,305	Logie, Barnes
R5	11 February 1950	Burnley	H	2–0	55,458	Compton D, Lewis
R6	4 March 1950	Leeds United	H	1–0	62,573	Lewis
SF	18 March 1950	Chelsea	N	2–2	67,752	Cox, Compton L
SF R	22 March 1950	Chelsea	N	1–0 (aet)	66,482	Cox
F	29 April 1950	Liverpool	N	2–0	100,000	Lewis (2)

== See also ==
- 1949–50 in English football
- List of Arsenal F.C. seasons
