= Lionel Smith (footballer) =

English footballer (1920–1980)

Personal information
- Date of birth: 23 August 1920
- Place of birth: Mexborough, Yorkshire, England
- Date of death: 6 November 1980 (aged 60)
- Place of death: London, England
- Position: Full back

Youth career
- Mexborough Albion
- Yorkshire Tar Distillers
- Denaby United

Senior career*
| Years | Team | Apps | (Gls) |
| 1939–1954 | Arsenal | 162 | (0) |
| 1954–1955 | Watford | 7 | (0) |

International career
| 1950–1953 | England | 6 | (0) |

Managerial career
- 1955–1960: Gravesend & Northfleet
- * Club domestic league appearances and goals

Lionel Smith (23 August 1920 – 6 November 1980) was an English footballer who played in the Football League as a full back for Arsenal and Watford. He was capped six times for England in the 1950s.

== Biography ==
Born in Mexborough, West Riding of Yorkshire, Smith played for local non-league sides before signing as an amateur with London club Arsenal in April 1939. He turned professional that summer, only for World War II to break out; Smith joined the Royal Engineers and served as a sapper, but also played in some wartime matches for Arsenal (17 in all). An injury incurred in a crane accident threatened to disrupt his career, but when first-class football resumed in 1946-47, Smith had made a full recovery, and was made captain of the Gunners' reserve side.

Smith primarily played as a full back, but his initial chances were few and far between; Arsenal already had experienced full backs in Laurie Scott and Walley Barnes. Smith made his debut at centre half, deputising for Leslie Compton, in an 8–0 victory over Grimsby Town on 1 May 1948, the final match of their 1947-48 First Division-winning season. Smith finally gained a regular place at left back, after Scott suffered a series of injuries and Barnes switched sides to cover for him.

Smith was known for his pace and the quality of his distribution (whenever possible, he eschewed "hoofing" the ball up the pitch), and finally picked up a medal when he played in the Gunners' FA Cup final victory over Liverpool in 1950. Smith got international recognition when he was picked for England for a match against Wales on 15 November 1950, making his debut at the relatively late age of 30. He went on to win six caps for his country.

Having only played once in the Gunners' 1947-48 title-winning season, Smith finally picked up a League winners' medal in 1952-53, making 31 appearances that season. However, by now he was 33, and his age was starting to count against him, especially with the younger Dennis Evans threatening his place. He only played ten matches in 1953-54, and at the end of that season he left the club on a free transfer. In all he had played 181 games for Arsenal, never scoring a goal.

He spent a single season at Watford, before moving to Gravesend & Northfleet as manager, where he won the 1957-58 Southern League title. Smith stepped down as Gravesend manager in 1960, and retired from football altogether. He died in 1980, aged 60.

== Honours ==
Arsenal

- Football League First Division: 1952–53
- FA Charity Shield: 1948
- FA Cup runner-up: 1951–52
