= Jimmy Logie =

Scottish footballer

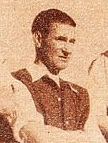

Personal information
- Full name: James Tullis Logie
- Date of birth: 23 November 1919
- Place of birth: Edinburgh, Scotland
- Date of death: 30 April 1984 (aged 64)
- Place of death: London, England
- Position: Inside forward

Youth career
- Lochore Welfare

Senior career*
Years	Team	Apps	(Gls)
1939–1955	Arsenal	296	(68)
1955–1960	Gravesend & Northfleet		

International career
1952	Scotland	1	(0)

Managerial career
- 1955–1960: Gravesend & Northfleet
- * Club domestic league appearances and goals

James Tullis Logie (23 November 1919 – 30 April 1984) was a Scottish footballer.

== Career ==
Born in Edinburgh and raised in the city's Grassmarket, Logie first played for Scottish junior side Lochore Welfare, before being signed by London giants Arsenal in June 1939. Soon afterwards World War II broke out, and Logie was called up; he served in the Royal Navy for the entire duration of the conflict, guesting for hometown St Bernards, Dunfermline Athletic and Grimsby Town when his service permitted. In 1940, he made a guest appearance, scoring once, for Southampton.

After being demobbed he rejoined Arsenal, playing several wartime matches, before making his full first-team debut against Wolves on 31 August 1946. Logie was a talented and creative player (many observers likened him to his fellow countryman Alex James, who had played for Arsenal in the 1930s), and for the next eight seasons he was a regular in the Arsenal side, playing at inside forward. He took part in all of Arsenal's early post-war successes; Arsenal won two First Division titles in 1947–48 and 1952–53, and the 1949–50 FA Cup – Logie set up both goals in a 2–0 win over Liverpool in the final. In the latter stages of his career he also served as Arsenal vice-captain, behind Joe Mercer.

Despite his success at Arsenal, Logie only ever won a single a cap for Scotland, playing against Northern Ireland on 5 November 1952. In all he played 328 matches for Arsenal, scoring 76 goals. He left the Gunners in February 1955, joining non-league Gravesend & Northfleet, helping them win the 1957-58 Southern League championship and lasting there until 1960.

After retirement Logie fell on hard times; football was not the lucrative profession it is currently, He eventually ended up working in a newsagents in Piccadilly Circus. He died in 1984, aged 64.

== Honours ==
Arsenal

- Football League First Division: 1947–48, 1952–53
- FA Cup: 1949–50; runner-up: 1951–52
- FA Charity Shield: 1948, 1953

Gravesend & Northfleet

- Southern League Championship: 1958
