= Laurie Scott (footballer) =

English footballer and manager

Personal information
- Full name: Lawrence Scott
- Date of birth: 23 April 1917
- Place of birth: Sheffield, Yorkshire, England
- Date of death: 18 July 1999 (aged 82)
- Height: 5 ft 8 in (1.73 m)
- Position: Full back

Senior career*
Years	Team	Apps	(Gls)
1935–1937	Bradford City	39	(0)
1937–1951	Arsenal	115	(0)
1951–1952	Crystal Palace	28	(0)
Total		182	(0)

International career
1946–1948	England	17	(0)
1950	England B	4	(0)

Managerial career
- 1951–1954: Crystal Palace
- 1954–1957: Hendon
- 1958–1968: Hitchin Town
- * Club domestic league appearances and goals

Lawrence Scott (23 April 1917 – 18 July 1999) was an English footballer who played as a full back for Bradford City, Arsenal and Crystal Palace either side of World War II. He also made 17 appearances for the England national team.

== Career ==
Born in Sheffield, Scott joined Bradford City as a youth player, and played 39 times for the club, mostly as a winger. In February 1937 he was signed by Arsenal, in exchange for Ernie Tuckett, though he only played as a reserve for the first two years at the club. At the start of World War II, Scott joined the Royal Air Force as a PT instructor, but still guested as a player for the RAF, Arsenal, Sheffield United, and England in wartime matches.

By the time peace broke out, Scott had grown into being one of the country's most assured full backs, known for his pace and composure on the ball. He made his official first-team debut for Arsenal against West Ham United in the FA Cup in 1946, and his League debut on the first day of the 1946–47 season; he also made his official England debut against Ireland in September of that year. Arsenal won the First Division title in 1947–48, but after that Scott was blighted by injury; he was stricken with a bout of appendicitis in 1948, and then injured his knee whilst playing in an international for England against Wales on 10 November 1948.

Scott was out for the rest of the 1948–49 season and his appearances for Arsenal were limited for the next few seasons. However, he still figured in Arsenal's 1950 FA Cup-winning side and after a successful run in the England B side, he was picked for England's squad for the 1950 FIFA World Cup. By now though, he was 33, and had not played for his country for two years; England's first choice right-back for the entire tournament was Alf Ramsey, and Scott did not play a single minute. In 1950–51 Scott played 17 matches for Arsenal, but with his injury often recurring, he was no longer an automatic first-team choice, sharing the right-back position with Walley Barnes. In all he played for Arsenal in 127 official matches (and 191 unofficial wartime matches), and 17 times for England (plus 16 wartime caps).

He joined Crystal Palace, initially as player-manager, in October 1951. He managed the Eagles (then known as the Glaziers) for three years, but with little success; the club had to apply for re-admission to the Football League at the end of the 1953–54 season. He retired as a player in August 1953 having made 30 senior appearances for Palace and left the club in October 1954, with Palace having made a poor start to the season. He later had stints with non-league Hendon and Hitchin Town, reaching the semi-finals of the FA Amateur Cup twice with the latter.

He died on 18 July 1999 after a long illness, aged 82 years.

== Honours ==
Arsenal

- Football League First Division: 1947–48
- FA Cup: 1949–50
