= 1948 FA Charity Shield =

- The match programme cover
- Event: FA Charity Shield
Arsenal	Manchester United
4	3
- Date: 6 October 1948
- Venue: Highbury, London
- Attendance: 31,000
- Weather: Cold

The 1948 FA Charity Shield was the 26th Charity Shield, an annual English association football match played between the winners of the previous season's Football League and FA Cup. It was the first edition held since the postponement of football during the Second World War. The match, held at Highbury on 6 October 1948, was contested by Arsenal, champions of the 1947–48 Football League and Manchester United, who beat Blackpool in the final of the 1947–48 FA Cup. This was Arsenal's eighth Charity Shield appearance to Manchester United's third.

Watched by a crowd of over 30,000, Reg Lewis, Bryn Jones, and Ronnie Rooke each scored for the league champions inside the first 15 minutes. Manchester United responded by scoring twice before the half-time break through Jack Rowley and Ronnie Burke. Lionel Smith's own goal in the 53rd minute made the scoreline 4–3, and though United's attack were dominant in the second half, there were no further goals. Arsenal were awarded the Shield by A.V. Alexander, the Minister of Defence. Gate receipts for the match came to a total of £4,300.

== Background ==
The FA Charity Shield was founded in 1908 as a successor to the Sheriff of London Charity Shield. It was a contest between the respective champions of the Football League and Southern League, and then by 1913 teams of amateur and professional players. In 1921, it was played by the Football League champions and FA Cup winners for the first time. After a ten-year absence due to the suspension of football during the Second World War, the Charity Shield made a return in 1948.

Arsenal qualified for the 1948 FA Charity Shield as winners of the 1947–48 Football League First Division. It was the club's sixth league title and striker Ronnie Rooke scored 33 goals in the campaign to become the division's top goalscorer. The other Charity Shield place went to Manchester United who beat Blackpool to win the final of the 1947–48 FA Cup. Manchester United's progress in the competition was unique as the club was drawn against teams from the First Division in every round. Their home ties were staged at three different grounds as Old Trafford was being repaired from the damage sustained in the Manchester Blitz.

This was Arsenal's eighth Charity Shield appearance; prior to the game they had won five Shields (1930, 1931, 1933, 1934, 1938), and lost two (1935, 1936). By contrast Manchester United were undefeated in the Charity Shield; the club won their previous two appearances, in 1908 and 1911. Manchester United had beaten Arsenal 1–0 the last time the two clubs met at Highbury, for a league fixture on 30 August 1948; Charlie Mitten scored the only goal of the match.

== Match ==
=== Summary ===
Arsenal began the quicker of the two teams. Inside a minute, a miskick by Manchester United left back John Aston troubled his defence, and presented Reg Lewis and Rooke with shooting opportunities. After three minutes, Arsenal took the lead; combination play from Jimmy Logie and Bryn Jones forced goalkeeper Jack Crompton out of his area, and ended with Jones hitting the ball high into an empty net. Lewis headed in Archie Macaulay's cross from the right to double Arsenal's lead, and the team scored their third almost immediately, when Rooke maneuvered past the United defence to shoot past Crompton.

United regrouped and scored immediately. Charging forward, John Anderson and Jack Rowley each shot wide, before Johnny Morris's effort hit the post. The ball rebounded to Rowley, whose shot went in past goalkeeper George Swindin. United were in full ascendancy – "Anderson and Warner were winning the ball in mid-field, and bringing it through to their forwards [...], making the Arsenal defence feel the strain," so said The Times football correspondent. In the 35th minute however, Lewis scored his second goal of the match, beating Allenby Chilton to the ball first and going past Crompton. Five minutes before half-time, United halved Arsenal's lead – a well-worked move started by Carey in his own half was finished off by Burke.

Arsenal struggled to regain fluency in the second half, as their opponents dominated play. In the 53rd minute, United scored to make it 4–3; Charlie Mitten's flick in the area was diverted into the Arsenal net by Lionel Smith for an own goal. United fashioned further chances through Burke and Rowley, but for large periods of the second half the Arsenal defence stood firm. Jones' headed goal was rule out for offside, after which the match descended into a contest between United's attack and Arsenal's defence. Jimmy Delaney came closest to equalising late on, when he darted forward and missed by inches.

=== Details ===
6 October 1948
15:30 BST

Arsenal	4–3	Manchester United
Jones 3'; Lewis (?) 35'; Rooke (?)		Rowley 15'; Burke 40'; Smith 53' (o.g.)

Arsenal Stadium, London
Attendance: 31,000

Arsenal	Manchester United

GK	1	(England) George Swindin
RB	2	(Wales) Walley Barnes
LB	3	(England) Lionel Smith
RH	4	(Scotland) Archie Macaulay
CH	5	(England) Leslie Compton
LH	6	(England) Joe Mercer (c)
OR	7	(England) Don Roper
IR	8	(Scotland) Jimmy Logie
CF	9	(England) Reg Lewis
IL	10	(England) Ronnie Rooke
OL	11	(Wales) Bryn Jones
Manager:
(England) Tom Whittaker

GK	1	(England) Jack Crompton
RB	2	(Republic of Ireland) Johnny Carey (c)
LB	3	(England) John Aston
RH	4	(England) John Anderson
CH	5	(England) Allenby Chilton
LH	6	(Wales) Jack Warner
OR	7	(Scotland) Jimmy Delaney
IR	8	(England) Johnny Morris
CF	9	(England) Ronnie Burke
IL	10	(England) Jack Rowley
OL	11	(England) Charlie Mitten
Manager:
(Scotland) Matt Busby

== Post-match ==
A.V. Alexander, the Minister of Defence presented Arsenal with the Shield. Assessing the match the next day, Daily Express football correspondent John MacAdam wrote: "Charity begins at home, they say, and, by golly, it began at Highbury yesterday, for Arsenal were the luckiest team in the world to beat Manchester United 4–3 in the F.A. Charity Shield match between the winners of the League and the Cup." The Times correspondent assessed, "Arsenal won because they sneaked a commanding lead of three goals, before Manchester had realised they were in London," and concluded the piece with the sentence "It had been a game worthy of the occasion and of two fine clubs." Gate receipts for the match totalled £4,300.

Manchester United ended the season as runners-up to Portsmouth in the Football League First Division, and reached the semi-final stage of the FA Cup. Arsenal progressed no further than the fourth round of the cup competition, and finished sixth in the league. The two clubs next faced each other in the Charity Shield in 1993, when Manchester United won the inaugural Premier League title, and Arsenal were FA Cup winners in the 1992–93 season.

== See also ==
- 1948–49 Football League
- 1948–49 FA Cup
- Arsenal F.C.–Manchester United F.C. rivalry
