= Jack Wilkins (footballer) =

Irish footballer

Personal information
- Full name: Leonard Henry John Wilkins
- Date of birth: 12 August 1920
- Place of birth: Dublin, Ireland
- Date of death: March 2009 (aged 88)
- Place of death: Cornwall, England
- Height: 5 ft 10 in (1.78 m)
- Position: Defender

Senior career*
Years	Team	Apps	(Gls)
194?–1948	Guildford City		
1948–1952	Brighton & Hove Albion	45	(1)
1952–1954	Bedford Town	83	(0)
1954–19??	Haywards Heath		
- * Club domestic league appearances and goals

Leonard Henry John Wilkins (12 August 1920 – March 2009) was an Irish professional footballer who played as a full back or centre half in the Football League for Brighton & Hove Albion.

== Life and career ==
Wilkins was born in 1920 in Dublin and raised in London. He served as a sergeant in the Royal Electrical and Mechanical Engineers during the Second World War, and played for Guildford City of the Southern League while stationed in the area. He signed for Brighton & Hove Albion in October 1948, initially as an amateur, and by the time he turned professional after his demobilisation in July 1950, he had already made 27 appearances in the Third Division South. He played in a further 20 first-team matches as a professional, but lost his place before the 1951–52 season and was sold at the end of it, to Bedford Town of the Southern League for a fee of £3,500.

He was ever-present in his first season and was appointed captain. When Ronnie Rooke was removed as manager halfway through the 1953–54 season, Wilkins and Doug Gardiner acted as joint caretakers for some months. Wilkins was released at the end of the season, having made 109 appearances, of which 83 were in the Southern League. He rejoined Rooke at Haywards Heath of the Metropolitan & District League, and remained with them for some years, as player, player-coach, and manager.

Outside football, he worked as a wholesale confectionery salesman. Wilkins died in Cornwall in 2009 at the age of 88.
