= 1944–45 Arsenal F.C. season =

English football club season

Arsenal
1944–45 season
- Chairman: Robin Vane-Tempest-Stewart, 8th Marquess of Londonderry
- Manager: George Allison
- Football League South: 8th
- Football League South Cup: Semi-final

The 1944–45 season was Arsenal Football Club's sixth season playing wartime football during World War II. They finished eighth the Football League South, their poorest performance of the wartime era. Arsenal reached the semifinals in the Football League South Cup.

== Background ==
Arsenal played their home games at White Hart Lane, as Highbury had been transformed to support Air Raid Precautions.

Arsenal had a poor start to the league and failed to recover, finishing eighth in the Football League South. Arsenal's most reliable scorer Reg Lewis was unavailable due to his military service. Stan Mortensen, a guest player from Blackpool, scored 18 goals for Arsenal in 12 games. Ted Drake, another reliable scorer, was injured with a slipped disk and his career came to an end.

Arsenal reached the semifinals of the Football League South Cup but did not reach the finals, losing to Millwall.

== Results ==
Arsenal's score comes first

=== Legend ===
Win	Draw	Loss

=== Football League South ===
Selected results from the league.

Date	Opponent	Venue	Result	Attendance	Scorers
2 September 1944	Tottenham Hotspur	A	0–4		
21 October 1944	West Ham United	H	0–3	27,800	
28 October 1944	Crystal Palace	A	3–4		
25 November 1944	Chelsea	A	1–2		
9 December 1944	Tottenham Hotspur	H	2–3		
23 December 1944	Brentford	H	5–2	18,527	
24 February 1945	Reading	H	0–2		
24 March 1945	Crystal Palace	H	1–0		
2 April 1945	Brentford	A	1–3		
28 April 1945	Chelsea	H	3–0		
5 May 1945	West Ham United	A	1–1	9,000	
	Reading	A	1–3		

==== Final League table ====
Pos	Team	Pld	W	D	L	GF	GA	GR	Pts
1	Tottenham Hotspur (C)	30	23	6	1	81	30	2.700	52
2	West Ham United	30	22	3	5	96	47	2.043	47
3	Brentford	30	17	4	9	87	57	1.526	38
4	Chelsea	30	16	5	9	100	55	1.818	37
5	Southampton	30	17	3	10	96	69	1.391	37
6	Crystal Palace	30	15	5	10	74	70	1.057	35
7	Reading	30	14	6	10	78	68	1.147	34
8	Arsenal	30	14	3	13	77	67	1.149	31
9	Queen's Park Rangers	30	10	10	10	70	61	1.148	30
10	Watford	30	11	6	13	66	84	0.786	28
11	Fulham	30	11	4	15	79	83	0.952	26
12	Portsmouth	30	11	4	15	59	61	0.967	26
13	Charlton Athletic	30	12	2	16	72	81	0.889	26
14	Brighton & Hove Albion	30	10	2	18	66	95	0.695	22
15	Luton Town	30	6	7	17	59	104	0.567	19
16	Aldershot	30	7	4	19	44	85	0.518	18
17	Millwall	30	5	7	18	50	84	0.595	17
18	Clapton Orient	30	5	7	18	39	86	0.453	17

(C) League Champions

=== Football League South Cup ===
Round	Date	Opponent	Venue	Result	Attendance	Goalscorers
GS	3 February 1945	Reading	A	3–1		
GS	10 February 1945	Clapton Orient	H	5–0		
GS	17 February 1945	Portsmouth	A	4–2		
GS	24 February 1945	Reading	H	3–0		
GS	3 March 1945	Clapton Orient	A	3–1		
GS	10 March 1945	Portsmouth	H	2–4		
SF	17 March 1945	Millwall	N	0–1		
