= Alf Fields =

English footballer

Personal information
- Date of birth: 15 November 1918
- Place of birth: Canning Town, England
- Date of death: 14 November 2011 (aged 92)
- Place of death: England
- Position: Centre half

Youth career
- 1936–1939: Arsenal

Senior career*
Years	Team	Apps	(Gls)
1939–1952	Arsenal	19	(0)
- * Club domestic league appearances and goals

Alf Fields BEM (15 November 1918 – 14 November 2011) was an English professional footballer who played as a centre half.

== Career ==
Fields signed with Arsenal in 1936, turned professional in 1937, and made his debut in 1939. Between then and 1952, Fields made a total of 19 appearances in the Football League. Arsenal won the old First Division in 1947–48, but he only made six league appearances all season. After retiring as a player, Fields spent time as a coach at Arsenal, before eventually retiring in November 1983.

Fields played himself in the 1939 film The Arsenal Stadium Mystery.

During World War II, Fields served in North Africa and Italy, earning the British Empire Medal.

As the time of his death, Fields was Arsenal's oldest surviving player. He died on 14 November 2011, one day before his 93rd birthday.
