= George Curtis (footballer, born 1919) =

English footballer and manager

Personal information
- Full name: George Frederick Curtis
- Date of birth: 3 December 1919
- Place of birth: West Thurrock, Essex, England
- Date of death: 17 November 2004 (aged 84)
- Place of death: Basildon, Essex, England
- Height: 5 ft 8 in (1.73 m)
- Position: Inside forward

Youth career
- 19??–1936: Anglo (Purfleet)

Senior career*
Years	Team	Apps	(Gls)
1936–1947	Arsenal	13	(0)
1936–1938	→ Margate (loan)		
1947–1952	Southampton	174	(11)
1952–1953	Valenciennes		
1953–1954	Chelmsford City		

Managerial career
- 1945: Mohun Bagan
- 1961–1963: Brighton & Hove Albion
- 1963–1967: Stevenage Town
- 1968: San Diego Toros
- 1969–1970: Rosenborg
- 1971–1974: Norway
- 1976: Rosenborg
- * Club domestic league appearances and goals

George Frederick Curtis (3 December 1919 – 17 November 2004) was an English professional footballer and coach, who played as an inside forward.

== Playing career ==
=== Arsenal ===
Curtis played as a youth for Anglo (Purfleet) before signing for Arsenal in December 1936. He spent over a year at Arsenal's nursery club, Margate, before returning to Highbury in February 1938; he made his Arsenal debut in a 2–1 win at Highbury against Blackpool on 10 April 1939. He went on to make only one other first team appearance during that season. World War II intervened that September and he spent the war serving in the Royal Air Force stationed in India, but also played over 50 wartime matches for Arsenal. He also appeared as a guest player for West Ham United later in World War II.

After hostilities ended he played 12 times in the 1946–47 season, but was sold to Southampton in part-exchange for Don Roper in summer 1947; in all he played 14 times for the Gunners, never scoring.

=== Southampton ===
Curtis had impressed Southampton manager Bill Dodgin who valued him at £10,000, in an exchange transfer that also saw Tom Rudkin arrive at The Dell, with Don Roper moving to Highbury.

Nicknamed Twinkletoes by his teammates, Curtis was a clever, nimble player, whose feints and tricks were appreciated by the supporters, although they often frustrated his colleagues. 'Soccer Star' magazine described Curtis as an "inside-forward-cum-wing-half".

During his five seasons at Southampton the club narrowly missed promotion to Division 1 for three consecutive seasons; 1947–48 they finished in third place, a feat repeated the following season (despite having an 8-point lead with 8 games to play) whilst in 1949–50 they were to be denied promotion by 0.06 of a goal, missing out on second place to Sheffield United.

After five memorable seasons at The Dell, he moved to the French second division. In all he played 183 games for Southampton, scoring 12 goals.

=== Later career ===
He then joined French team Valenciennes for a fee of £1,500 staying for a year between 1952 and 1953, before returning to see out his playing days as player-coach at Chelmsford City. Curtis' move to Chelmsford City was somewhat hindered due to a strike in France, but he eventually joined the Southern League side for 'a four-figure fee'.

He then embarked on a coaching course at Lilleshall working with Walter Winterbottom. His coaching skills were quickly in demand and between 1957 and 1961 he was a coach with Sunderland.

== Management career ==
=== Mohun Bagan ===
Before the beginning of his coaching career, Curtis went on to manage noted Indian club Mohun Bagan for a while in 1945, during his wartime visit to the country.

=== Brighton and Hove Albion ===
His first managerial position came in June 1961 when he was appointed manager at Brighton & Hove Albion. At the end of his first season in charge, Brighton were relegated from the Second division in last place. He stayed at Brighton until February 1963, when he was replaced by Archie Macaulay.

=== Stevenage Town ===
After leaving Brighton, Curtis joined Stevenage Town in June 1963 as the first manager of their professional era. He guided the club to promotion to the Southern League Premier Division in 1966/67, before leaving the club at the end of that campaign. Curtis's tenure lasted for 260 games, during which time the club won 134 matches.

=== Rosenborg ===
He was appointed as head coach at Norwegian side Rosenborg ahead of the 1969 season replacing Knut Næss.

His first meeting with the Rosenborg players is legendary:

"This is a ball," Curtis stated whilst pointing to the round leather ball. "Don't go too fast, now!" Odd Iversen laughed.

Curtis introduced modern defensive football to Norway, with a flat backline 4–4–2 formation, pressure on the ball carrier and tactical focus. The 1969 debut season ended with a premiership title for Rosenborg, with Odd Iversen scoring 26 of the team's 36 league goals. Despite this success, both the club leadership and the spectators disliked George Curtis's defensive style and pressure was put on Curtis to play a more attacking style.

In September 1969, Rosenborg met Curtis's former club, Southampton, in the first round of the Inter-Cities Fairs Cup, with Southampton going through 2–1 on aggregate, the goals coming from Ron Davies and Terry Paine with Rosenborg's goal scored by Sunde.

Curtis was allowed to continue for one more season. Despite coming second in the 1970 league season, it was an anti-climax. The dynamic duo of Iversen and Harald Sunde had been sold to Belgian Division 2 club Racing Mechelen before the start of the season and with them went all of Rosenborg's attacking play. 18 league games later, Rosenborg ended up with an almost unbelievable goal difference of 15–5! At the end of the season, George Curtis was dismissed and was replaced by Nils Arne Eggen.

=== Norway national team ===
Curtis returned to England, but in 1972 he returned to Norway to coach the national team. During the Euro 72 qualifying campaign, Norway picked up only one point in six games, and in a World Cup qualifier against the Netherlands on 1 November 1972, Norway lost 9–0. The next year, they suffered a perhaps even more humiliating result by losing 2–1 against Luxembourg.

Under his management, Norway played 17 international matches (of which only 3 were won) before he was sacked in June 1974. Again, he was replaced by Eggen.

=== Rosenborg (again) ===
Before the 1976 season, he was once again appointed as head coach at Rosenborg. After a car accident in which his Norwegian wife died, Curtis's focus shifted elsewhere and Rosenborg quickly ended up struggling to avoid relegation. A 0–4 defeat against Division 3 side Røros in the 2nd round of the cup sealed his fate: Curtis was released from his contract on 27 August 1976. Again, his successor was Nils Arne Eggen. His final coaching job was spent in Qatar from 1979 to 1981.

=== Coaching ===
Curtis's time in football also included spells coaching at Cambridge University, Hastings, Hull City and San Diego Toros.

== After football ==
He retired to live on the Essex coast where he continued to coach youngsters as part of the FIFA coaching scheme, remaining as passionate about the game as ever.

He died in 2004, reportedly spending the final years of his life living on his own in a caravan in Chelmsford.

== Honours ==
=== Managerial ===
Rosenborg BK

- Eliteserien: 1969

== Bibliography ==
- Harris, Jeff (1995). Hogg, Tony (ed.). Arsenal Who's Who. Independent UK Sports. ISBN 1-899429-03-4.
- Håvard Lindheim (2004). "George Curtis is dead". RBKweb.
