= David Nelson (footballer) =

Scottish footballer and manager

Personal information
- Full name: David Nelson
- Date of birth: 3 February 1918
- Place of birth: Douglas Water, Scotland
- Date of death: 27 September 1988 (aged 70)
- Place of death: West Haven, Connecticut, United States
- Position: Wing half

Senior career*
Years	Team	Apps	(Gls)
–1936	Douglas Water Thistle		
1936	St Bernard's	10	(7)
1936–1946	Arsenal	27	(4)
1940	→ Motherwell (guest)		
1942	→ Celtic (guest)		
- → Tottenham Hotspur (guest)
1945–1946	→ Colchester United (guest)		
1946–1947	Fulham	23	(3)
1947–1950	Brentford	106	(5)
1950–1952	Queens Park Rangers	31	(0)
1952–1953	Crystal Palace	12	(0)
1953–1955	Ashford Town	44	(2)
Total		253	(21)

Managerial career
- 1953–1955: Ashford Town (player-manager)
- * Club domestic league appearances and goals

David Nelson (3 February 1918 – 27 September 1988) was a Scottish professional football player and manager, who played in the Football League for Brentford, Queens Park Rangers, Arsenal, Fulham and Crystal Palace as a wing half.

== Career ==
A wing half, Nelson began his career with hometown junior club Douglas Water Thistle, before moving to Scottish League Second Division club St Bernard's in January 1936. He scored seven goals in 12 appearances during the second half of the 1935–36 season and moved to England to sign for First Division club Arsenal for a £200 fee in May 1936. Nelson made just 9 appearances before the Second World War broke out in September 1939, but he had experienced some joy in the reserve team, winning the London Combination in 1936–37, 1937–38 and 1938–39. Nelson made 164 appearances for the Gunners during the war and also played as a guest for Motherwell, Celtic, Clapton Orient, Tottenham Hotspur, Brentford and Chesterfield during the Second World War. He made further competitive Arsenal appearances during the 1945–46 and 1946–47 seasons, before leaving Highbury in December 1946. Nelson made 29 competitive appearances and scored four goals in over a decade with Arsenal.

Nelson joined Second Division club Fulham in December 1946, as a makeweight in the deal that took Ronnie Rooke to Arsenal. He made 24 appearances and scored four goals before he and teammate Peter Buchanan transferred to newly relegated Second Division club Brentford for a £6,000 deal in August 1947. Nelson was a regular at wing half and made 113 appearances, scoring five goals, before transferring to Second Division club Queens Park Rangers in February 1950, in exchange for Bill Pointon. He remained at Loftus Road for just over two years and departed having made 31 appearances.

Nelson dropped down to the Third Division South to join Crystal Palace in March 1952, but he made just 12 appearances before his departure the following year. Nelson ended his career as player-manager at Kent League club Ashford Town between March 1953 and May 1955.

== Personal life ==
Nelson served as a sergeant in the British Army during the Second World War. He emigrated to the United States in the late 1950s and worked at a car plant in St. Louis. At the time of his death, he was living in Greenwich, Connecticut.

== Career statistics ==
=== Player ===
Appearances and goals by club, season and competition
Club	Season	League			National cup (Note: Includes Scottish Cup, FA Cup)		Other		Total	
Club	Season	Division	Apps	Goals	Apps	Goals	Apps	Goals	Apps	Goals
St Bernard's	1935–36	Scottish Second Division	10	7	2	0	—		12	7
Arsenal	1936–37	First Division	8	3	0	0	—		8	3
Arsenal	1938–39	First Division	9	1	0	0	—		9	1
Arsenal	1945–46	—			2	0	—		2	0
Arsenal	1946–47	First Division	10	0	—		—		10	0
Arsenal	Total		27	4	2	0	—		29	4
Colchester United (loan)	1945–46	Southern League	3	0	—		—		3	0
Fulham	1946–47	Second Division	23	3	1	0	—		24	3
Brentford	1947–48	Second Division	40	3	2	0	—		42	3
Brentford	1948–49	Second Division	40	2	4	0	—		44	2
Brentford	1949–50	Second Division	26	0	1	0	—		27	0
Brentford	Total		106	5	7	0	—		113	5
Queens Park Rangers	1949–50	Second Division	13	0	—		—		13	0
Queens Park Rangers	1950–51	Second Division	18	0	0	0	—		18	0
Queens Park Rangers	Total		31	0	0	0	—		31	0
Ashford Town	1952–53	Kent League	4	0	—		—		4	0
Ashford Town	1953–54	Kent League	24	2	3	0	3 (Note: 2 appearances and 1 goal in Kent League Cup, 1 goal in Kent Senior Shield)	1	30	3
Ashford Town	1954–55	Kent League	16	0	1	0	3 (Note: Appearances in Kent Senior Cup)	0	20	0
Ashford Town	Total		44	2	4	0	6	1	54	3
Career total			244	21	16	0	6	1	266	22

=== Manager ===
Managerial record by team and tenure
Team	From	To	Record				
Team	From	To	P	W	D	L	Win %
Ashford Town	21 March 1953	31 May 1955	86	24	20	42	27.9
Total			86	24	20	42	27.9
