= Knut Næss =

Norwegian footballer and manager (1927-2015)

Personal information
- Full name: Knut Næss
- Date of birth: 11 March 1927
- Place of birth: Trondheim, Norway
- Date of death: 11 September 2015 (aged 88)
- Place of death: Trondheim, Norway
- Position: Left half

Youth career
- 1937–1945: Rosenborg

Senior career*
Years	Team	Apps	(Gls)
1945–1960	Rosenborg	~200	

Managerial career
- 1959–1960: Rosenborg
- 1960–1963: Nidelv
- 1963–1968: Rosenborg
- * Club domestic league appearances and goals

Knut Næss (11 March 1927 – 11 September 2015) was a Norwegian footballer and manager who coached Rosenborg BK to the club's first three major trophies: the Norwegian Cup in 1960 and 1964, and the 1967 League Championship.

Næss joined Rosenborg in 1937 and spent his entire player career there, except during World War II when he played for an illegal team called "Falkenkameratene" at a time when all organized football in Norway was suspended because of the wartime sports boycott which lasted from 1941 until the end of the war. He played around 200 games for Rosenborg as a left half (midfielder), and also was their captain. He had to retire in 1960 due to an injury.

In the 1959-60 season Næss coached Rosenborg, with fellow player Olav Wang as his assistant, and secured both victory in the 1960 Norwegian Cup (the first club from Trøndelag to do so) as well as the club's first-ever promotion to the top division.

Næss then left Rosenborg, and coached Nidelv IL to double promotion (from fourth to second division), before returning to Rosenborg at the end of the 1963 season. With Næss as coach, Rosenborg won the Norwegian Cup for the second time in 1964 and again secured a promotion to the top division. In 1967, Næss guided Rosenborg to its first-ever league title, and finished second in 1968. Næss then chose to retire from coaching, and was succeeded by George Curtis from England.
