= Ian McPherson (footballer) =

Scottish footballer

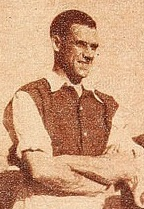

Personal information
- Full name: Ian Buchanan McPherson
- Date of birth: 26 July 1920
- Place of birth: Glasgow, Scotland
- Date of death: 20 March 1983 (aged 62)
- Place of death: St Albans, England
- Position: Winger

Youth career
- –1939: Rangers

Senior career*
Years	Team	Apps	(Gls)
1939–1945	Rangers	1	(0)
1945–1946	Notts County	0	(0)
1946–1951	Arsenal	152	(19)
1951–1953	Notts County	50	(7)
1953–1954	Brentford	4	(0)
1954	Bedford Town	17	(6)
1954–1955	Cambridge United		
- * Club domestic league appearances and goals

Ian Buchanan McPherson DFC (26 July 1920 – 20 March 1983) was a Scottish footballer whose clubs included Rangers, Notts County and Arsenal.

== Career ==
A native of Glasgow, McPherson first joined Rangers as a youth player and made his debut in a 3–1 victory over Arbroath on 26 August 1939, although World War II intervened during the early part of his career, and all competitive football was suspended. After 15 goals in 16 wartime appearances, McPherson left Rangers to serve in the RAF and was awarded the Distinguished Flying Cross in 1944 and 1945. After returning from duty, he joined Notts County in 1945, playing in regional wartime leagues. After a single season with the Magpies, McPherson was signed by Arsenal in August 1946 (in part-exchange for Reg Cumner), in time for the resumption of competitive League football that autumn.

He made his Arsenal debut against Wolves in the club's first post-war First Division match, on 31 August 1946; Arsenal lost 6–1, their biggest League defeat in nearly twenty years. Although the Gunners had been the dominant force in English football in the 1930s, they struggled in their first season after the war, only finishing 13th; McPherson played 40 times that season on the right wing.

However, with the appointment of Tom Whittaker as manager in the summer of 1947 the Gunners immediately went back to winning ways, and McPherson was a regular in the First Division Championship-winning of 1947–48, playing 29 League matches, mostly on the right wing but also the left after Denis Compton was injured. Characterised by his pace, physical strength and powerful shooting (but also known for his inconsistent form, much to the frustration of Arsenal's fans), McPherson continued to be a regular in the Arsenal side for the next three seasons, although he missed Arsenal's only other success at the time, the 1950 FA Cup Final, with Freddie Cox and Denis Compton playing on the wings that day.

Having passed the age of thirty and with his place under threat from the likes of Cox and Arthur Milton. McPherson left Arsenal in the summer of 1951, returning to his old club Notts County. In total, he played 163 matches for the Gunners, scoring 21 goals. He spent two seasons at Notts County before spells at Brentford, then non-league Bedford Town and Cambridge United. He died in St Albans in 1983, aged 62.

== Honours ==
Arsenal

- First Division: 1947–48
