= Cyril Grant =

English footballer

Personal information
- Date of birth: 10 July 1920
- Place of birth: Wath-on-Dearne, England
- Date of death: 2002 (aged 81–82)
- Position: Forward

Senior career*
Years	Team	Apps	(Gls)
1938–1946	Lincoln City	0	(0)
1946–1947	Arsenal	2	(0)
1947–1948	Fulham	14	(4)
1948–1955	Southend United	175	(63)
- Gravesend & Northfleet
- * Club domestic league appearances and goals

Cyril Grant (10 July 1920 – 2002) was an English professional footballer. He was born in Wath, Yorkshire.

Grant started his career with Lincoln City during World War II as a centre forward. He was transferred to Arsenal in August 1946 as a possible replacement for Ted Drake, but he spent only five months with the club. During this time he played two league matches before being transferred to Fulham in January 1947 as part of a swap deal for Ronnie Rooke.

He scored four goals in fourteen league matches for Fulham, but he left the club in March 1948 for Southend United of the Third Division South. In seven years with the club, he scored 64 goals in 183 matches. He finished his career with Gravesend & Northfleet.
