= Tommy Rudkin =

English footballer

Personal information
- Full name: Thomas William Rudkin
- Date of birth: 16 June 1919
- Place of birth: Peterborough, England
- Date of death: 30 April 1969 (aged 49)
- Place of death: Wisbech, England
- Position: Winger

Youth career
- 193?–1938: Creswell

Senior career*
Years	Team	Apps	(Gls)
1938–1938	Wolverhampton Wanderers	0	(0)
1938–1939	Lincoln City	2	(1)
1939–1946	Peterborough United	44	(0)
1943	→ Lincoln City (war guest)	1	(0)
1944	→ Hartlepool United (war guest)	1	(0)
1947–1947	Arsenal	5	(2)
1947–1949	Southampton	9	(0)
1949–1951	Bristol City	34	(4)
1951–1952	Hastings United	?	(?)
1952–1953	Weston-super-Mare		
1953	Peterborough United	2	(0)
Total		98+	(7+)

Managerial career
- 1952–1953: Weston-super-Mare player-manager
- * Club domestic league appearances and goals

Thomas William Rudkin (16 June 1919 – 30 April 1969) was an English professional footballer who played as a left winger. He made 50 appearances in the Football League in the years before and after the Second World War.

== Career ==
=== Pre-war ===
Born in Peterborough, Rudkin played for Creswell before joining Wolverhampton Wanderers as an amateur in February 1938 before moving to Lincoln City in May 1938.

=== Wartime ===
In the Second World War, Rudkin joined a tank regiment based at Catterick, before being sent to Germany

During the war, Rudkin had a number of spells with hometown club Peterborough United in the Midland League, as well as guest appearances for Lincoln City, Hartlepool United, Darlington, Southampton and Middlesbrough.

=== Post-war ===
After the war Rudkin played for Peterborough United in their pre-Football League days and joined First Division Arsenal in January 1947. He made five appearances for Arsenal during the 1946–47 season. Rudkin and George Curtis joined Southampton in exchange for Don Roper in August 1947 with Rudkin valued at £3,000. He made only a few sporadic appearances over the next two seasons before moving to Ashton Gate.

Bob Wright signed Rudkin for Bristol City in May 1949 from Southampton Rudkin made his debut for Bristol City at outside left in the opening fixture of Third Division South season in a 3–1 win over Northampton Town on 20 August 1949. Rudkin made 27 appearances scoring three goals in 1949–50 and a further seven appearances with one goal in 1950–51 as Bristol City languished in mid table. However, in 1951, Rudkin (with three appearances) helped the "Robins" to reach the fifth round of the FA Cup before losing 2–0 at Birmingham City.

Rudkin left Bristol City to join struggling Southern League club Hastings United in June 1951, but later returned to the south-west as player-manager of Weston-super-Mare before settling in his native Peterborough.

== Later career ==
After retiring from football, he joined the Sunday Pictorial as a circulation agent and then became a steward at a Peterborough nightclub. Later, he became the licensee of the Angel Hotel, Wisbech where he collapsed suddenly and died, at age 49.
