= Reg Lewis (footballer) =

English footballer

Personal information
- Full name: Reginald Lewis
- Date of birth: 7 March 1920
- Place of birth: Bilston, Staffordshire, England
- Date of death: 2 April 1997 (aged 77)
- Place of death: Chadwell Heath, London, England
- Position: Centre forward

Senior career*
Years	Team	Apps	(Gls)
1935–1953	Arsenal	154	(103)

International career
1950	England B	2	(2)
- * Club domestic league appearances and goals

Reginald Lewis (7 March 1920 – 2 April 1997) was an English footballer. Playing as a striker, Lewis solely featured for Arsenal throughout his footballing career. Lewis is Arsenal's 12th highest goalscorer of all time.

== Playing career ==
Born in Bilston, Staffordshire and raised in South London Lewis spent his entire career at Arsenal, however as a youth team player he played for Margate FC which in those days was a nursery club for The Arsenal. He joined the club as a schoolboy in 1935, and scored on his debut against Everton on 1 January 1938. He made only four appearances in 1937-38, however, and as a result missed out on a League Championship winners' medal. Lewis broke into the first-team more in 1938-39, making 16 appearances in league and cup, scoring 7 goals, but the advent of the Second World War interrupted his career.

During the war Lewis continued to play for Arsenal and shone as a natural goalscorer; although wartime appearances and goals are not officially counted, Lewis scored 143 goals in 130 games, including four in the 1943 War Cup Southern Final, in a 7–1 defeat of Charlton Athletic. Towards the end of the war he served in the British Army of the Rhine in Occupied Germany, but returned to play for Arsenal once first-class football resumed in 1946.

On 24 August 1946 an additional fixture was arranged between England and Scotland with all proceeds going to the Bolton Disaster Fund. Lewis was called up to replace the injured Tommy Lawton.

Although most of the Arsenal side of the 1930s were past their best by this time, Lewis was still only 26 and he continued to be a regular in the first team throughout the remainder of the 1940s. He was the club's top scorer in 1946-47 with 29 goals, and the following 1947-48 season, he partnered new signing Ronnie Rooke and between them they scored 47 goals as Arsenal won the First Division title. Lewis continued to be a regular for the rest of the decade and he enjoyed arguably his best season in 1949-50. As such in this season, he scored 19 goals in 31 league games and played twice for the England B team. Lewis capped it altogether by scoring both goals in Arsenal's 2–0 victory over Liverpool in the 1950 FA Cup Final.

However, during the early 1950s, Lewis became constantly afflicted with injuries, and he made only 12 appearances in 1951-52 and none at all in 1952-53. In the close season of 1953, he retired from the game at the age of 33. His 116 goals in 176 matches makes him Arsenal's twelfth top goalscorer of all time. After retiring, Lewis first ran a pub, then worked in insurance. He died in Chadwell Heath, London in April 1997 at the age of 77.

== Honours ==
Arsenal

- Football League First Division: 1947–48
- FA Cup: 1949–50
- FA Charity Shield: 1948
