= Cyril Hodges =

English footballer

Personal information
- Full name: Cyril Leslie Hodges
- Date of birth: 18 September 1919
- Place of birth: Hackney, England
- Date of death: September 1979 (aged 59–60)
- Place of death: Brighton, England
- Position: Forward

Senior career*
Years	Team	Apps	(Gls)
19??–1944	Eton Manor		
1944–1946	Arsenal	2	(0)
1946–1947	Brighton & Hove Albion	9	(3)
1947–19??	Haywards Heath		
Total		11	(3)

Managerial career
- 1947–195?: Haywards Heath (coach)
- * Club domestic league appearances and goals

Cyril Leslie Hodges (18 September 1919 – September 1979) was an English professional footballer who played as a forward in the Football League.

== Career ==
Hodges was born in Hackney, London, in 1919. After playing with Eton Manor, Hodges joined Arsenal in 1944 and turned professional in April 1945. He made two appearances for them in the Football League, before joining Brighton & Hove Albion, where he made a further nine League appearances. After a spell as a player-coach with Haywards Heath, Hodges spent eleven years as trainer and then coach at Brighton & Hove Albion. He remained living in Brighton, and died in the town in September 1979.
