= 1950 FA Cup final =

- Event: 1949–50 FA Cup
Arsenal	Liverpool
2	0
- Date: 29 April 1950
- Venue: Wembley Stadium, London
- Referee: Harry Pearce (Luton)
- Attendance: 100,000

The 1950 FA Cup final was the 69th final of the FA Cup. It took place on 29 April 1950 at Wembley Stadium and was contested between Arsenal and Liverpool.

Arsenal won the match 2–0 to win the FA Cup for the third time, with both goals scored by Reg Lewis. The Arsenal team also featured cricketer Denis Compton, who played alongside his brother Leslie. Liverpool dropped future manager Bob Paisley for the match, even though he had scored against Merseyside rivals Everton in the semi-final.

== Match details ==
29 April 1950
15:00 BST

Arsenal	2–0	Liverpool
Lewis 18' 63'	(Report)

Wembley Stadium, London
Attendance: 100,000
Referee: Harry Pearce

Arsenal	Liverpool

GK	1	(England) George Swindin
RB	2	(England) Laurie Scott
LB	3	(Wales) Walley Barnes
RH	4	(Scotland) Alex Forbes
CH	5	(England) Leslie Compton
LH	6	(England) Joe Mercer (c)
OR	7	(England) Freddie Cox
IR	8	(Scotland) Jimmy Logie
CF	9	(England) Peter Goring
IL	10	(England) Reg Lewis
OL	11	(England) Denis Compton
Manager:
(England) Tom Whittaker

GK	1	(Wales) Cyril Sidlow
RB	2	(Wales) Ray Lambert
LB	3	(England) Eddie Spicer
RH	4	(England) Phil Taylor (c)
CH	5	(England) Laurie Hughes
LH	6	(England) Bill Jones
OR	7	(England) Jimmy Payne
IR	8	(England) Kevin Baron
CF	9	(England) Albert Stubbins
IL	10	(Scotland) Willie Fagan
OL	11	(Scotland) Billy Liddell
Manager:
(England) George Kay
