= Eddie Quigley =

English footballer and manager (1921–1997)

Personal information
- Full name: Edward Quigley
- Date of birth: 13 July 1921
- Place of birth: Bury, England
- Date of death: 18 April 1997 (aged 75)
- Position: Centre forward

Senior career*
Years	Team	Apps	(Gls)
1946–1947	Bury	42	(18)
1947–1949	Sheffield Wednesday	74	(50)
1949–1951	Preston North End	52	(17)
1951–1955	Blackburn Rovers	159	(92)
Total		327	(177)
- * Club domestic league appearances and goals

Edward Quigley (13 July 1921 – 18 April 1997) was an English football player and manager.

He was born in Bury, Lancashire, the son of Edward and Martha (née Rowley) Quigley.

A forward, he scored 179 goals from 337 appearances in the Football League playing as a forward for Bury, Sheffield Wednesday, Preston North End and Blackburn Rovers in the post World War II era. He was transferred from Sheffield Wednesday to Preston for a fee of £26,500, which was at the time a British transfer record.

Quigley began his football career playing for Bury as a 16-year-old full back and he came to prominence in February 1947 when playing as a centre forward for the first time, against Millwall, he scored all their five goals in a 5–2 win. In October 1947 after netting 18 goals for Bury he was snapped up by Sheffield Wednesday for £12,000 and was their top scorer for the next two seasons. After his record breaking transfer to Preston, he struggled with injury and form, with only five goals in 20 games in his first season, nine in 20 in the next as Preston gained promotion to the first division and after 12 games in the top flight he lost his place in the team. In mid November 1951 he transferred to Blackburn Rovers for a fee of £20,000 where over four seasons he recaptured his prolific scoring form back in the Second Division.

He re-signed for Bury in 1956 where he made ten League appearances before retiring from League football at the end of the 1956–57 season. Later in life, he lamented that only at Bury did he play regularly as a centre forward, with the clubs who signed him usually deploying him as a right sided forward.

He joined Mossley as player-manager in the summer of 1957. Over the next six seasons he appeared 197 times for the club scoring 56 goals, before retiring from playing when he left the club in 1962, aged 41.

He then returned to Bury as a youth-team coach. In April 1967, after a brief spell as caretaker manager at Blackburn, Quigley was confirmed in the position on a permanent basis. In October 1970, he was replaced by Johnny Carey and became chief scout. He and Carey were both sacked on 7 June 1971. He later managed Stockport County.

He died in Blackpool in 1997 at the age of 75.
