= Ronnie Rooke =

English footballer (1911–1985)

Personal information
- Full name: Ronald Leslie Rooke
- Date of birth: 7 December 1911
- Place of birth: Guildford, Surrey, England
- Date of death: 9 June 1985 (aged 73)
- Place of death: Bedford, Bedfordshire, England
- Height: 5 ft 10 in (1.78 m)
- Position: Centre forward

Senior career*
Years	Team	Apps	(Gls)
1931–1933	Guildford City	19	(20)
1932–1933	Woking	25	(29)
1933–1936	Crystal Palace	18	(6)
1936–1946	Fulham	287	(247)
1946–1949	Arsenal	88	(68)
1949–1950	Crystal Palace	45	(26)
1951–1954	Bedford Town	136	(96)
1954–1956	Haywards Heath Town	71	(67)
1956–1957	Addlestone	23	(13)
1959–1961	Bedford Town	50	(22)
Total		762	(594)

International career
1935	The Football League XI	1	(1)
1942	England (wartime)	1	(0)

Managerial career
- 1949–1950: Crystal Palace (player-manager)
- 1951–1953: Bedford Town (player-manager)
- 1954–1956: Haywards Heath Town (player-manager)
- 1956–1957: Addlestone (player-manager)
- 1959–1961: Bedford Town (player-manager)
- * Club domestic league appearances and goals

Ronald Leslie Rooke (7 December 1911 – 9 June 1985) was an English footballer who played as a centre forward. During his three decades' playing career, he scored at least 934 goals in 1030 official matches, among which more than 768 league goals at all levels. According to the RSSSF, he is the best league goalscorer of all time, and the fourth overall behind Erwin Helmchen, Josef Bican and Cristiano Ronaldo.

Including wartime results and appearances in reserve teams, he has made over 1,000 appearances in his career.

== Playing career ==
Rooke was born in Guildford, Surrey, and began his playing career with local club Guildford City. He then had a spell with Woking in 1932–33 during which he scored 29 goals from 16 appearances in all competitions. In 1933, he joined Crystal Palace, who were at the time in the Third Division South. He played mainly for the Palace reserve side, only playing eighteen league matches and scoring six goals between 1933 and 1936. He then moved to Second Division club Fulham for a £300 fee in November 1936. He was the club's leading scorer for three consecutive seasons and contributed all six goals in a 6–0 FA Cup demolition of Bury, which is still (as of 2013) a club record.

He had scored 57 goals in 87 league matches for Fulham before the outbreak of the second world war. However, Rooke's career did not stop, serving as a physical training instructor in the RAF, enabled him to continue playing, where he made 199 appearances in the wartime games for Fulham, scoring 212 goals. He also won a Wartime International cap for England in 1942, against Wales. In 1945, Rooke had guested for Arsenal in a match against the touring Dynamo Moscow team. The resumption of league football in 1946 saw Rooke score a further 13 goals in 18 appearances for Fulham, before a surprising transfer to the first division strugglers Arsenal in December that year. Rooke left Fulham after scoring 70 goals in 105 league appearances for the club and a total of 291 including war games. Despite being 35 years old and never having played in the top flight, the Gunners paid £1,000 with two players, Cyril Grant and Dave Nelson, moving to Craven Cottage.

However surprising the signing may have been, Rooke made an immediate impact: he scored the winner on his debut, against Charlton Athletic on 14 December 1946, and by the end of the season had taken his total to 21 goals from 24 league matches and helped Arsenal finish in mid-table. He scored 33 league goals in 1947–48, a total that made him that season's First Division top scorer, and helped propel the Gunners to their sixth League title. He remains (as of 2020) Arsenal's all-time record-holder for the most goals scored in a postwar season. Rooke scored another 15 goals in 1948–49, including one in Arsenal's 4–3 victory over Manchester United in the 1948 FA Charity Shield. For the Gunners Rooke scored 70 goals in 94 matches in all competitions.

In total he scored 170 goals from 256 appearances in the Football League for Crystal Palace, Fulham and Arsenal. His goal exploits continued in non-league football, becoming a player-manager for various clubs before his eventual retirement, ending a career that stretched over thirty years.

== Managerial career ==
Rooke left Arsenal in the summer of 1949, to rejoin former club Crystal Palace as player-manager. His first season as manager was moderately successful as Palace finished seventh in the Third Division South. The next season began poorly, and in November 1950 he moved on to Bedford Town, having increased his appearances and goals totals for Palace to 63 and 32 respectively. He initially featured as a player for Bedford, before being appointed player-manager in February 1951, a job he held until December 1953. During this spell at the club Rooke scored 101 goals from 139 appearances in all competitions.

He then moved on to become player-manager at Haywards Heath Town and Addlestone, before returning to Bedford in 1959. Although his second spell saw him appointed only as a manager, he made two first team appearances when the club were lacking players. He was sacked after the club lost an FA Cup match against Hitchin Town in September 1961.

== Personal life ==
Rooke later worked at Heathrow Airport and Whitbread brewery. He died of lung cancer in Bedford, Bedfordshire, in June 1985.

== Honours ==
=== As player ===
Arsenal

- First Division: 1947–48
- FA Charity Shield: 1948

=== As manager ===
Bedford Town

- Huntingdonshire Premier Cup: 1951–52

=== Individual ===
- First Division top scorer: 1947–48
- Daily Express Footballer of the Season: 1947–48

== See also ==
- List of men's footballers with 500 or more goals
