= 1949–50 FA Cup =

Tournament details
- Country: England; Wales

Final positions
- Champions: Arsenal (3rd title)
- Runners-up: Liverpool

The 1949–50 FA Cup was the 69th season of the world's oldest football cup competition, the Football Association Challenge Cup, commonly known as the FA Cup. Arsenal won the competition for the third time, beating Liverpool 2–0 in the final at Wembley, through two goals from Reg Lewis.

Matches were scheduled to be played at the stadium of the team named first on the date specified for each round, which was always a Saturday. Some matches, however, might be rescheduled for other days if there were clashes with games for other competitions or the weather was inclement. If scores were level after 90 minutes had been played, a replay would take place at the stadium of the second-named team later the same week. If the replayed match was drawn further replays would be held until a winner was determined. If scores were level after 90 minutes had been played in a replay, a 30-minute period of extra time would be played.

== Calendar ==
Round	Date
Extra preliminary round	Saturday 3 September 1949
Preliminary round	Saturday 17 September 1949
First round qualifying	Saturday 1 October 1949
Second round qualifying	Saturday 15 October 1949
Third round qualifying	Saturday 29 October 1949
Fourth round qualifying	Saturday 12 November 1949
First round proper	Saturday 26 November 1949
Second round proper	Saturday 10 December 1949
Third round proper	Saturday 7 January 1950
Fourth round proper	Saturday 28 January 1950
Fifth round proper	Saturday 11 February 1950
Sixth round proper	Saturday 4 March 1950
Semi-finals	Saturday 18 March 1950
Final	Saturday 29 April 1950

== Qualifying rounds ==
Most participating clubs that were not members of the Football League competed in the qualifying rounds to secure one of 25 places available in the first round.

The 25 winners from the fourth qualifying round were Billingham Synthonia, North Shields, Stockton, Netherfield, Fleetwood, Rhyl, Mossley, Bromsgrove Rovers, Witton Albion, Goole Town, Nuneaton Borough, Grantham, Hereford United, King's Lynn, Wealdstone, Tilbury, Gravesend & Northfleet, Walthamstow Avenue, Chelmsford City, Gillingham, Hastings United, Leytonstone, Romford, Weymouth and Gloucester City.

Those appearing in the competition proper for the first time were Fleetwood, Mossley, Nuneaton Borough, Wealdstone, Tilbury and Hastings United, while Goole Town had not featured at this stage since 1914–15. Mossley was also the most successful team from the extra preliminary round, progressing to the second round proper by defeating Ashton United, Altrincham, Northwich Victoria, Buxton, Droylsden, Runcorn and Witton Albion.

== First round proper ==
At this stage 41 clubs from the Football League Third Division North and South joined the 25 non-league clubs that came through the qualifying rounds. Rotherham United, Reading and Bournemouth & Boscombe Athletic were given byes to the third round. To make the number of matches up, non-league sides Yeovil Town and Bromley were given byes to this round, Yeovil after reaching the fifth round of the previous FA Cup tournament and Bromley as the champions from the previous season's FA Amateur Cup.

Bradford City defeated Fleetwood Town 9–0 at Valley Parade; this game is Bradford's second-largest victory and Fleetwood's largest defeat in their respective histories.

34 matches were scheduled to be played on Saturday, 26 November 1949. Three were drawn and went to replays.

Tie no	Home team	Score	Away team	Date
1	Chester	4–1	Goole Town	26 November 1949
2	Darlington	2–2	Crewe Alexandra	26 November 1949
Replay	Crewe Alexandra	1–0	Darlington	30 November 1949
3	Hastings United	1–3	Gillingham	26 November 1949
4	Weymouth	2–2	Aldershot	26 November 1949
Replay	Aldershot	2–3	Weymouth	30 November 1949
5	Yeovil Town	4–1	Romford	26 November 1949
6	Notts County	4–0	Tilbury	26 November 1949
7	Nottingham Forest	1–0	Bristol City	26 November 1949
8	Swindon Town	1–0	Bristol Rovers	26 November 1949
9	Doncaster Rovers	5–1	New Brighton	26 November 1949
10	Wrexham	4–1	Grantham	26 November 1949
11	Ipswich Town	2–1	Brighton & Hove Albion	26 November 1949
12	Tranmere Rovers	2–1	Halifax Town	26 November 1949
13	Stockport County	3–0	Billingham Synthonia	26 November 1949
14	Leytonstone	1–2	Chelmsford City	26 November 1949
15	Accrington Stanley	0–1	Hartlepools United	26 November 1949
16	Northampton Town	4–1	Walthamstow Avenue	26 November 1949
17	Bromley	1–2	Watford	26 November 1949
18	Rhyl	0–3	Rochdale	26 November 1949
19	Bradford City	9–0	Fleetwood	26 November 1949
20	Millwall	3–5	Exeter City	26 November 1949
21	Carlisle United	1–0	Lincoln City	26 November 1949
22	Oldham Athletic	4–0	Stockton	26 November 1949
23	Crystal Palace	0–3	Newport County	26 November 1949
24	Witton Albion	0–1	Mossley	26 November 1949
25	Mansfield Town	4–1	Walsall	26 November 1949
26	Port Vale	1–0	Wealdstone	26 November 1949
27	Southport	1–1	Barrow	26 November 1949
Replay	Barrow	0–1	Southport	1 December 1949
28	Hereford United	3–0	Bromsgrove Rovers	26 November 1949
29	Netherfield (Kendal)	4–3	North Shields	26 November 1949
30	Gloucester City	2–3	Norwich City	26 November 1949
31	Gateshead	3–1	York City	26 November 1949
32	Leyton Orient	0–2	Southend United	26 November 1949
33	Nuneaton Borough	2–1	King's Lynn	26 November 1949
34	Gravesend & Northfleet	1–3	Torquay United	26 November 1949

== Second round proper ==
The matches were played on Saturday, 10 December 1949. Six matches were drawn, with replays taking place later the same week. One of these replays went to a second replay.

Tie no	Home team	Score	Away team	Date
1	Rochdale	1–2	Notts County	10 December 1949
2	Watford	6–0	Netherfield (Kendal)	10 December 1949
3	Weymouth	2–1	Hereford United	10 December 1949
4	Yeovil Town	3–1	Gillingham	10 December 1949
5	Nottingham Forest	0–2	Stockport County	10 December 1949
6	Crewe Alexandra	1–1	Oldham Athletic	10 December 1949
Replay	Oldham Athletic	0–0	Crewe Alexandra	13 December 1949
Replay	Crewe Alexandra	0–3	Oldham Athletic	19 December 1949
7	Doncaster Rovers	1–0	Mansfield Town	10 December 1949
8	Wrexham	2–2	Southend United	10 December 1949
Replay	Southend United	2–0	Wrexham	15 December 1949
9	Northampton Town	4–2	Torquay United	10 December 1949
10	Carlisle United	2–0	Swindon Town	10 December 1949
11	Exeter City	2–0	Chester	10 December 1949
12	Hartlepools United	1–1	Norwich City	10 December 1949
Replay	Norwich City	5–1	Hartlepools United	16 December 1949
13	Port Vale	1–0	Tranmere Rovers	10 December 1949
14	Newport County	1–1	Gateshead	10 December 1949
Replay	Gateshead	1–2	Newport County	15 December 1949
15	Southport	2–1	Bradford City	10 December 1949
16	Chelmsford City	1–1	Ipswich Town	10 December 1949
Replay	Ipswich Town	1–0	Chelmsford City	15 December 1949
17	Nuneaton Borough	0–0	Mossley	10 December 1949
Replay	Mossley	0–3	Nuneaton Borough	17 December 1949

== Third round proper ==
The 44 First and Second Division clubs entered the competition at this stage along with Rotherham United, Reading and Bournemouth & Boscombe Athletic.

The matches were scheduled for Saturday, 7 January 1950. Nine matches were drawn and went to replays, with one of these going to a second replay. Weymouth, Yeovil Town and Nuneaton Borough were the last non-league clubs left in the competition.

Tie no	Home team	Score	Away team	Date
1	Blackpool	4–0	Southend United	7 January 1950
2	Chesterfield	3–1	Yeovil Town	7 January 1950
3	Bury	5–4	Rotherham United	7 January 1950
4	Watford	2–2	Preston North End	7 January 1950
Replay	Preston North End	0–1	Watford	11 January 1950
5	Reading	2–3	Doncaster Rovers	7 January 1950
6	Notts County	1–4	Burnley	7 January 1950
7	Blackburn Rovers	0–0	Liverpool	7 January 1950
Replay	Liverpool	2–1	Blackburn Rovers	11 January 1950
8	Aston Villa	2–2	Middlesbrough	7 January 1950
Replay	Middlesbrough	0–0	Aston Villa	11 January 1950
Replay	Aston Villa	0–3	Middlesbrough	16 January 1950
9	Sunderland	6–0	Huddersfield Town	7 January 1950
10	Luton Town	3–4	Grimsby Town	7 January 1950
11	Sheffield United	3–1	Leicester City	7 January 1950
12	Stockport County	4–2	Barnsley	7 January 1950
13	Manchester City	3–5	Derby County	7 January 1950
14	Queens Park Rangers	0–2	Everton	7 January 1950
15	Brentford	0–1	Chelsea	7 January 1950
16	Northampton Town	1–1	Southampton	7 January 1950
Replay	Southampton	2–3	Northampton Town	11 January 1950
17	Coventry City	1–2	Bolton Wanderers	7 January 1950
18	Portsmouth	1–1	Norwich City	7 January 1950
Replay	Norwich City	0–2	Portsmouth	12 January 1950
19	West Ham United	5–1	Ipswich Town	7 January 1950
20	Manchester United	4–0	Weymouth	7 January 1950
21	Plymouth Argyle	1–1	Wolverhampton Wanderers	7 January 1950
Replay	Wolverhampton Wanderers	3–0	Plymouth Argyle	11 January 1950
22	Carlisle United	2–5	Leeds United	7 January 1950
23	Oldham Athletic	2–7	Newcastle United	7 January 1950
24	Bradford Park Avenue	0–1	Bournemouth & Boscombe Athletic	7 January 1950
25	Exeter City	3–0	Nuneaton Borough	7 January 1950
26	Cardiff City	2–2	West Bromwich Albion	7 January 1950
Replay	West Bromwich Albion	0–1	Cardiff City	11 January 1950
27	Newport County	1–2	Port Vale	7 January 1950
28	Swansea Town	3–0	Birmingham City	7 January 1950
29	Charlton Athletic	2–2	Fulham	7 January 1950
Replay	Fulham	1–2	Charlton Athletic	11 January 1950
30	Arsenal	1–0	Sheffield Wednesday	7 January 1950
31	Southport	0–0	Hull City	7 January 1950
Replay	Hull City	5–0	Southport	12 January 1950
32	Stoke City	0–1	Tottenham Hotspur	7 January 1950

== Fourth round proper ==
The matches were scheduled for Saturday, 28 January 1950. Six games were drawn and went to replays, which were all played in the following midweek match.

Tie no	Home team	Score	Away team	Date
1	Blackpool	2–1	Doncaster Rovers	28 January 1950
2	Chesterfield	3–2	Middlesbrough	28 January 1950
3	Bournemouth & Boscombe Athletic	1–1	Northampton Town	28 January 1950
Replay	Northampton Town	2–1	Bournemouth & Boscombe Athletic	2 February 1950
4	Burnley	2–1	Port Vale	28 January 1950
5	Bury	2–2	Derby County	28 January 1950
Replay	Derby County	5–2	Bury	1 February 1950
6	Liverpool	3–1	Exeter City	28 January 1950
7	Watford	0–1	Manchester United	28 January 1950
8	Wolverhampton Wanderers	0–0	Sheffield United	28 January 1950
Replay	Sheffield United	3–4	Wolverhampton Wanderers	1 February 1950
9	Stockport County	0–0	Hull City	28 January 1950
Replay	Hull City	0–2	Stockport County	2 February 1950
10	Tottenham Hotspur	5–1	Sunderland	28 January 1950
11	Portsmouth	5–0	Grimsby Town	28 January 1950
12	West Ham United	1–2	Everton	28 January 1950
13	Chelsea	3–0	Newcastle United	28 January 1950
14	Charlton Athletic	1–1	Cardiff City	28 January 1950
Replay	Cardiff City	2–0	Charlton Athletic	1 February 1950
15	Arsenal	2–1	Swansea Town	28 January 1950
16	Leeds United	1–1	Bolton Wanderers	28 January 1950
Replay	Bolton Wanderers	2–3	Leeds United	1 February 1950

== Fifth round proper ==
The matches were scheduled for Saturday, 11 February 1950. There were three replays in total, each taking place four days later.

Tie no	Home team	Score	Away team	Date
1	Chesterfield	1–1	Chelsea	11 February 1950
Replay	Chelsea	3–0	Chesterfield	15 February 1950
2	Wolverhampton Wanderers	0–0	Blackpool	11 February 1950
Replay	Blackpool	1–0	Wolverhampton Wanderers	15 February 1950
3	Derby County	4–2	Northampton Town	11 February 1950
4	Everton	1–0	Tottenham Hotspur	11 February 1950
5	Stockport County	1–2	Liverpool	11 February 1950
6	Manchester United	3–3	Portsmouth	11 February 1950
Replay	Portsmouth	1–3	Manchester United	15 February 1950
7	Arsenal	2–0	Burnley	11 February 1950
8	Leeds United	3–1	Cardiff City	11 February 1950

== Sixth round proper ==
The four quarter-final ties were scheduled to be played on Saturday, 4 March 1950. There were no replays.

Tie no	Home team	Score	Away team	Date
1	Liverpool	2–1	Blackpool	4 March 1950
2	Derby County	1–2	Everton	4 March 1950
3	Chelsea	2–0	Manchester United	4 March 1950
4	Arsenal	1–0	Leeds United	4 March 1950

== Semi-finals ==
The semi-final matches were intended to be played on Saturday, 18 March 1950, although the Liverpool–Everton fixture was not played until the week after. The London derby clash of Arsenal–Chelsea went to a replay, with Arsenal eventually winning their tie to meet Liverpool in the final at Wembley.

25 March 1950
15:00

Liverpool	2–0	Everton

Maine Road, Manchester

18 March 1950
15:00

Arsenal	2–2	Chelsea

White Hart Lane, London

Replay

22 March 1950
19:45

Chelsea	0–1 (a.e.t.)	Arsenal

White Hart Lane, London

== Final ==
The 1950 FA Cup Final was contested by Arsenal and Liverpool at Wembley. Arsenal won 2–0, with both goals scored by Reg Lewis. Future legendary Liverpool manager Bob Paisley was famously dropped for the final, even after scoring the winning goal against rivals Everton in the semi-final.

=== Match facts ===
29 April 1950
15:00 BST

Arsenal	2–0	Liverpool
Lewis 18' 63'	(Report)

Wembley Stadium, London
Attendance: 100,000

Arsenal	Liverpool

== See also ==
- FA Cup Final Results 1872-
