= 1947–48 in English football =

Football in England
- Season: 1947–48

Men's football
- First Division: Arsenal
- Second Division: Birmingham City
- FA Cup: Manchester United

The 1947–48 season was the 68th season of competitive football in England.

Arsenal won the league title this season for the sixth time in their history, having been league champions five times during the 1930s.

Manchester United won the FA Cup, defeating Blackpool 4-2 in the final.

== Honours ==
Competition	Winner	Runner-up
First Division	Arsenal	Manchester United
Second Division	Birmingham City	Newcastle United
Third Division North	Lincoln City	Rotherham United
Third Division South	Queens Park Rangers	Bournemouth & Boscombe Athletic
FA Cup	Manchester United	Blackpool
Home Championship	England	Wales

== Football League ==
=== First Division ===
Arsenal won the title in their first season under new manager Tom Whittaker. Manchester United finished as runners-up for the second season in a row, though won their first silverware under Matt Busby by emerging victorious in the FA Cup. Burnley finished third, impressing in their first top-flight season in 18 years.

Grimsby Town and Blackburn Rovers were relegated to Division Two.

Pos	Team	Pld	W	D	L	GF	GA	GAv	Pts	Relegation
1	Arsenal (C)	42	23	13	6	81	32	2.531	59	
2	Manchester United	42	19	14	9	81	48	1.688	52	
3	Burnley	42	20	12	10	56	43	1.302	52	
4	Derby County	42	19	12	11	77	57	1.351	50	
5	Wolverhampton Wanderers	42	19	9	14	83	70	1.186	47	
6	Aston Villa	42	19	9	14	65	57	1.140	47	
7	Preston North End	42	20	7	15	67	68	0.985	47	
8	Portsmouth	42	19	7	16	68	50	1.360	45	
9	Blackpool	42	17	10	15	57	41	1.390	44	
10	Manchester City	42	15	12	15	52	47	1.106	42	
11	Liverpool	42	16	10	16	65	61	1.066	42	
12	Sheffield United	42	16	10	16	65	70	0.929	42	
13	Charlton Athletic	42	17	6	19	57	66	0.864	40	
14	Everton	42	17	6	19	52	66	0.788	40	
15	Stoke City	42	14	10	18	41	55	0.745	38	
16	Middlesbrough	42	14	9	19	71	73	0.973	37	
17	Bolton Wanderers	42	16	5	21	46	58	0.793	37	
18	Chelsea	42	14	9	19	53	71	0.746	37	
19	Huddersfield Town	42	12	12	18	51	60	0.850	36	
20	Sunderland	42	13	10	19	56	67	0.836	36	
21	Blackburn Rovers (R)	42	11	10	21	54	72	0.750	32	Relegation to the Second Division
22	Grimsby Town (R)	42	8	6	28	45	111	0.405	22	Relegation to the Second Division

Source: World Football
Rules for classification: 1) Points; 2) Goal average; 3) Goals scored
(C) Champions; (R) Relegated

=== Second Division ===
Pos	Team	Pld	W	D	L	GF	GA	GAv	Pts	Qualification or relegation
1	Birmingham City (C, P)	42	22	15	5	55	24	2.292	59	Promotion to the First Division
2	Newcastle United (P)	42	24	8	10	72	41	1.756	56	Promotion to the First Division
3	Southampton	42	21	10	11	71	53	1.340	52	
4	Sheffield Wednesday	42	20	11	11	66	53	1.245	51	
5	Cardiff City	42	18	11	13	61	58	1.052	47	
6	West Ham United	42	16	14	12	55	53	1.038	46	
7	West Bromwich Albion	42	18	9	15	63	58	1.086	45	
8	Tottenham Hotspur	42	15	14	13	56	43	1.302	44	
9	Leicester City	42	16	11	15	60	57	1.053	43	
10	Coventry City	42	14	13	15	59	52	1.135	41	
11	Fulham	42	15	10	17	47	46	1.022	40	
12	Barnsley	42	15	10	17	62	64	0.969	40	
13	Luton Town	42	14	12	16	56	59	0.949	40	
14	Bradford (Park Avenue)	42	16	8	18	68	72	0.944	40	
15	Brentford	42	13	14	15	44	61	0.721	40	
16	Chesterfield	42	16	7	19	54	55	0.982	39	
17	Plymouth Argyle	42	9	20	13	40	58	0.690	38	
18	Leeds United	42	14	8	20	62	72	0.861	36	
19	Nottingham Forest	42	12	11	19	54	60	0.900	35	
20	Bury	42	9	16	17	58	68	0.853	34	
21	Doncaster Rovers (R)	42	9	11	22	40	66	0.606	29	Relegation to the Third Division North
22	Millwall (R)	42	9	11	22	44	74	0.595	29	Relegation to the Third Division South

Rules for classification: 1) Points; 2) Goal average; 3) Goals scored
(C) Champions; (P) Promoted; (R) Relegated

=== Third Division North ===
Pos	Team	Pld	W	D	L	GF	GA	GAv	Pts	Promotion
1	Lincoln City (C, P)	42	26	8	8	81	40	2.025	60	Promotion to the Second Division
2	Rotherham United	42	25	9	8	95	49	1.939	59	
3	Wrexham	42	21	8	13	74	54	1.370	50	
4	Gateshead	42	19	11	12	75	57	1.316	49	
5	Hull City	42	18	11	13	59	48	1.229	47	
6	Accrington Stanley	42	20	6	16	62	59	1.051	46	
7	Barrow	42	16	13	13	49	40	1.225	45	
8	Mansfield Town	42	17	11	14	57	51	1.118	45	
9	Carlisle United	42	18	7	17	88	77	1.143	43	
10	Crewe Alexandra	42	18	7	17	61	63	0.968	43	
11	Oldham Athletic	42	14	13	15	63	64	0.984	41	
12	Rochdale	42	15	11	16	48	72	0.667	41	
13	York City	42	13	14	15	65	60	1.083	40	
14	Bradford City	42	15	10	17	65	66	0.985	40	
15	Southport	42	14	11	17	60	63	0.952	39	
16	Darlington	42	13	13	16	54	70	0.771	39	
17	Stockport County	42	13	12	17	63	67	0.940	38	
18	Tranmere Rovers	42	16	4	22	54	72	0.750	36	
19	Hartlepools United	42	14	8	20	51	73	0.699	36	
20	Chester	42	13	9	20	64	67	0.955	35	
21	Halifax Town	42	7	13	22	43	76	0.566	27	Re-elected
22	New Brighton	42	8	9	25	38	81	0.469	25	Re-elected

Source: rsssf.com
(C) Champions; (P) Promoted

=== Third Division South ===
Pos	Team	Pld	W	D	L	GF	GA	GAv	Pts	Promotion
1	Queens Park Rangers (C, P)	42	26	9	7	74	37	2.000	61	Promotion to the Second Division
2	Bournemouth & Boscombe Athletic	42	24	9	9	76	35	2.171	57	
3	Walsall	42	21	9	12	70	40	1.750	51	
4	Ipswich Town	42	23	3	16	67	61	1.098	49	
5	Swansea Town	42	18	12	12	70	52	1.346	48	
6	Notts County	42	19	8	15	68	59	1.153	46	
7	Bristol City	42	18	7	17	77	65	1.185	43	
8	Port Vale	42	16	11	15	63	54	1.167	43	
9	Southend United	42	15	13	14	51	58	0.879	43	
10	Reading	42	15	11	16	56	58	0.966	41	
11	Exeter City	42	15	11	16	55	63	0.873	41	
12	Newport County	42	14	13	15	61	73	0.836	41	
13	Crystal Palace	42	13	13	16	49	49	1.000	39	
14	Northampton Town	42	14	11	17	58	72	0.806	39	
15	Watford	42	14	10	18	57	79	0.722	38	
16	Swindon Town	42	10	16	16	41	46	0.891	36	
17	Leyton Orient	42	13	10	19	51	73	0.699	36	
18	Torquay United	42	11	13	18	63	62	1.016	35	
19	Aldershot	42	10	15	17	45	67	0.672	35	
20	Bristol Rovers	42	13	8	21	71	75	0.947	34	
21	Norwich City	42	13	8	21	61	76	0.803	34	Re-elected
22	Brighton & Hove Albion	42	11	12	19	43	73	0.589	34	Re-elected

(C) Champions; (P) Promoted

=== Top goalscorers ===
First Division

- Ronnie Rooke (Arsenal) – 33 goals

Second Division

- Eddie Quigley (Sheffield Wednesday) – 23 goals

Third Division North

- Jimmy Hutchinson (Lincoln City) – 32 goals

Third Division South

- Len Townsend (Bristol City) – 31 goals
