= 1947–48 Football League =

49th season of the Football League

The Football League
- Season: 1947–48
- Champions: Arsenal

The 1947–48 season was the 49th completed season of The Football League.

== Final league tables ==
The tables below are reproduced here in the exact form that they can be found at The Rec.Sport.Soccer Statistics Foundation website and in Rothmans Book of Football League Records 1888–89 to 1978–79, with home and away statistics separated.

Beginning with the season 1894–95, clubs finishing level on points were separated according to goal average (goals scored divided by goals conceded), or more properly put, goal ratio. In case one or more teams had the same goal difference, this system favoured those teams who had scored fewer goals. The goal average system was eventually scrapped beginning with the 1976–77 season.

From the 1922–23 season, the bottom two teams of both Third Division North and Third Division South were required to apply for re-election.

== First Division ==
First Division
- Season: 1947–48
- Champions: Arsenal; 6th English title
- Relegated: Blackburn Rovers; Grimsby Town
- Matches: 462
- Goals: 1,343 (2.91 per match)
- Top goalscorer: Ronnie Rooke (33 goals)

Arsenal, the most successful English club side of the 1930s, picked up their first postwar silverware, finishing top of the First Division by seven points. Their nearest rivals were Manchester United, who lifted the FA Cup with a dramatic 4–2 win over Blackpool at Wembley to end their 37-year wait for a major trophy. Burnley finished level on points with Matt Busby's team. Derby County, the 1946 FA Cup-winners, finished fourth in the league. Defending champions Liverpool finished 11th.

Grimsby Town were relegated in bottom place, 14 points adrift of safety, and were joined in the Second Division by Blackburn Rovers.

Pos	Team	Pld	W	D	L	GF	GA	GAv	Pts	Relegation
1	Arsenal (C)	42	23	13	6	81	32	2.531	59	
2	Manchester United	42	19	14	9	81	48	1.688	52	
3	Burnley	42	20	12	10	56	43	1.302	52	
4	Derby County	42	19	12	11	77	57	1.351	50	
5	Wolverhampton Wanderers	42	19	9	14	83	70	1.186	47	
6	Aston Villa	42	19	9	14	65	57	1.140	47	
7	Preston North End	42	20	7	15	67	68	0.985	47	
8	Portsmouth	42	19	7	16	68	50	1.360	45	
9	Blackpool	42	17	10	15	57	41	1.390	44	
10	Manchester City	42	15	12	15	52	47	1.106	42	
11	Liverpool	42	16	10	16	65	61	1.066	42	
12	Sheffield United	42	16	10	16	65	70	0.929	42	
13	Charlton Athletic	42	17	6	19	57	66	0.864	40	
14	Everton	42	17	6	19	52	66	0.788	40	
15	Stoke City	42	14	10	18	41	55	0.745	38	
16	Middlesbrough	42	14	9	19	71	73	0.973	37	
17	Bolton Wanderers	42	16	5	21	46	58	0.793	37	
18	Chelsea	42	14	9	19	53	71	0.746	37	
19	Huddersfield Town	42	12	12	18	51	60	0.850	36	
20	Sunderland	42	13	10	19	56	67	0.836	36	
21	Blackburn Rovers (R)	42	11	10	21	54	72	0.750	32	Relegation to the Second Division
22	Grimsby Town (R)	42	8	6	28	45	111	0.405	22	Relegation to the Second Division

Source: World Football
Rules for classification: 1) Points; 2) Goal average; 3) Goals scored
(C) Champions; (R) Relegated

=== Results ===
Home \ Away	ARS	AST	BLB	BLP	BOL	BUR	CHA	CHE	DER	EVE	GRI	HUD	LIV	MCI	MUN	MID	POR	PNE	SHU	STK	SUN	WOL
Arsenal		1–0	2–0	2–1	2–0	3–0	6–0	0–2	1–2	1–1	8–0	2–0	1–2	1–1	2–1	7–0	0–0	3–0	3–2	3–0	3–1	5–2
Aston Villa	4–2		3–2	0–1	3–1	2–2	2–1	3–0	2–2	3–0	2–2	2–1	2–1	1–1	0–1	1–1	2–1	4–1	2–0	1–0	2–0	1–2
Blackburn Rovers	0–1	0–0		1–1	4–0	1–2	0–0	1–1	3–4	2–3	4–0	1–2	1–2	1–0	1–1	1–7	1–0	2–3	4–0	2–0	4–3	1–0
Blackpool	3–0	1–0	1–0		1–1	0–1	3–1	3–0	2–2	5–0	3–1	4–0	2–0	1–1	1–0	1–0	1–0	0–1	2–1	1–2	0–1	2–2
Bolton Wanderers	0–1	1–0	1–0	1–0		1–1	1–0	2–1	0–3	0–0	2–0	1–5	3–0	2–1	0–1	1–3	4–0	1–2	2–3	0–1	3–1	3–2
Burnley	0–1	1–0	0–0	1–0	2–0		0–2	1–0	0–2	0–1	4–1	2–1	3–0	1–1	0–0	3–0	3–2	1–0	0–0	4–0	4–0	1–1
Charlton Athletic	2–4	1–1	0–1	2–0	2–1	1–1		3–1	1–5	2–3	2–3	0–0	2–0	0–1	1–2	1–0	2–2	1–2	4–0	0–1	1–0	5–1
Chelsea	0–0	4–2	1–0	2–2	1–1	0–2	3–0		1–0	3–1	2–3	2–4	3–1	2–2	0–4	4–2	1–0	2–0	1–0	4–1	1–1	1–1
Derby County	1–0	1–3	5–0	1–0	2–1	1–1	0–3	5–1		1–0	4–1	0–0	0–4	0–0	1–1	4–2	2–1	2–1	1–1	1–1	5–1	1–2
Everton	0–2	3–0	4–1	1–2	2–0	0–3	0–1	2–3	1–3		3–1	1–1	0–3	1–0	2–0	2–1	0–2	2–1	2–0	0–1	3–0	1–1
Grimsby Town	0–4	3–0	2–2	0–1	0–2	1–2	1–3	0–0	2–3	3–0		3–0	0–2	1–0	1–1	0–5	1–0	1–1	0–3	0–0	1–2	0–4
Huddersfield Town	1–1	0–1	1–1	2–0	1–2	0–1	0–1	3–1	2–1	1–3	5–1		1–1	1–1	0–2	2–1	0–2	1–0	2–1	0–0	2–2	0–1
Liverpool	1–3	3–3	2–1	2–0	0–0	1–1	2–3	3–0	2–2	4–0	3–1	4–0		1–1	2–2	0–1	0–3	3–1	4–0	0–0	0–0	2–1
Manchester City	0–0	0–2	1–3	1–0	0–2	4–1	4–0	1–0	3–2	0–1	3–1	1–1	2–0		0–0	2–0	1–0	0–3	4–3	3–0	3–0	4–3
Manchester United	1–1	2–0	4–1	1–1	0–2	5–0	6–2	5–0	1–0	2–2	3–4	4–4	2–0	1–1		2–1	3–2	1–1	0–1	1–1	3–1	3–2
Middlesbrough	1–1	1–3	1–1	4–0	4–1	1–2	1–2	0–0	1–1	0–1	4–1	1–0	3–1	2–1	2–2		1–2	1–1	3–0	2–1	2–2	2–4
Portsmouth	0–0	2–4	1–1	1–1	2–0	0–1	3–1	2–1	0–0	3–0	4–0	3–2	1–0	1–0	1–3	6–1		1–0	6–0	3–0	2–2	2–0
Preston North End	0–0	3–0	2–1	0–7	1–0	3–2	2–1	2–0	7–4	3–0	2–1	0–2	3–3	2–1	2–1	2–1	1–2		3–3	2–1	2–2	1–3
Sheffield United	1–2	3–1	4–1	2–1	2–1	1–1	1–1	3–1	1–2	2–1	4–0	0–1	3–1	2–1	2–1	1–1	1–2	3–1		3–0	3–2	2–2
Stoke City	0–0	1–2	2–1	1–1	2–0	3–0	0–1	2–0	1–0	1–1	2–1	1–1	0–2	3–0	0–2	2–4	2–1	0–1	1–1		3–1	2–3
Sunderland	1–1	0–0	0–1	1–0	1–2	2–0	0–1	2–3	1–1	2–0	4–2	2–0	5–1	0–1	1–0	3–0	4–1	0–2	1–1	1–0		2–1
Wolverhampton Wanderers	1–1	4–1	5–1	1–1	1–0	1–1	2–0	1–0	1–0	2–4	8–1	2–1	1–2	1–0	2–6	1–3	3–1	4–2	1–1	1–2	2–1	

Updated to match(es) played on unknown. Source: Ian Laschke: Rothmans Book of Football League Records 1888–89 to 1978–79. Macdonald and Jane’s, London & Sydney, 1980.
Legend: Blue = home team win; Yellow = draw; Red = away team win.

=== Maps ===
Locations of the Football League First Division London teams 1947–1948
Locations of the Football League First Division 1947–1948 teams

== Second Division ==
Second Division
- Season: 1947–48
- Champions: Birmingham City
- Promoted: Birmingham City; Newcastle United
- Relegated: Doncaster Rovers; Millwall
- Matches: 462
- Goals: 1,247 (2.7 per match)
- Top goalscorer: Eddie Quigley (23 goals)

Pos	Team	Pld	W	D	L	GF	GA	GAv	Pts	Qualification or relegation
1	Birmingham City (C, P)	42	22	15	5	55	24	2.292	59	Promotion to the First Division
2	Newcastle United (P)	42	24	8	10	72	41	1.756	56	Promotion to the First Division
3	Southampton	42	21	10	11	71	53	1.340	52	
4	Sheffield Wednesday	42	20	11	11	66	53	1.245	51	
5	Cardiff City	42	18	11	13	61	58	1.052	47	
6	West Ham United	42	16	14	12	55	53	1.038	46	
7	West Bromwich Albion	42	18	9	15	63	58	1.086	45	
8	Tottenham Hotspur	42	15	14	13	56	43	1.302	44	
9	Leicester City	42	16	11	15	60	57	1.053	43	
10	Coventry City	42	14	13	15	59	52	1.135	41	
11	Fulham	42	15	10	17	47	46	1.022	40	
12	Barnsley	42	15	10	17	62	64	0.969	40	
13	Luton Town	42	14	12	16	56	59	0.949	40	
14	Bradford (Park Avenue)	42	16	8	18	68	72	0.944	40	
15	Brentford	42	13	14	15	44	61	0.721	40	
16	Chesterfield	42	16	7	19	54	55	0.982	39	
17	Plymouth Argyle	42	9	20	13	40	58	0.690	38	
18	Leeds United	42	14	8	20	62	72	0.861	36	
19	Nottingham Forest	42	12	11	19	54	60	0.900	35	
20	Bury	42	9	16	17	58	68	0.853	34	
21	Doncaster Rovers (R)	42	9	11	22	40	66	0.606	29	Relegation to the Third Division North
22	Millwall (R)	42	9	11	22	44	74	0.595	29	Relegation to the Third Division South

Rules for classification: 1) Points; 2) Goal average; 3) Goals scored
(C) Champions; (P) Promoted; (R) Relegated

=== Results ===
Home \ Away	BAR	BIR	BPA	BRE	BRY	CAR	CHF	COV	DON	FUL	LEE	LEI	LUT	MIL	NEW	NOT	PLY	SHW	SOU	TOT	WBA	WHU
Barnsley		0–1	2–2	1–1	2–1	1–2	0–3	0–1	2–0	1–2	3–0	2–0	3–0	1–0	1–1	2–2	2–1	3–1	2–1	2–1	0–1	1–1
Birmingham	2–3		4–3	0–0	2–0	2–0	0–0	1–1	3–0	3–1	5–1	1–0	2–1	1–0	0–0	2–1	1–1	1–0	0–0	0–0	4–0	0–1
Bradford Park Avenue	3–2	1–2		1–1	5–3	0–1	1–3	2–2	4–0	3–0	3–1	0–2	2–2	4–0	0–3	3–1	3–0	2–0	1–3	0–2	3–1	4–1
Brentford	3–3	1–2	2–1		4–1	0–0	0–3	1–4	2–0	0–2	3–0	2–2	0–3	2–1	1–0	3–1	0–0	1–0	2–2	2–0	1–0	1–1
Bury	1–1	1–1	0–4	2–2		1–2	2–0	0–0	4–2	1–0	1–1	0–2	2–2	0–0	3–5	1–0	0–0	1–2	3–0	2–0	1–2	1–2
Cardiff City	1–0	2–0	1–0	1–0	2–2		0–0	1–1	3–0	0–0	0–0	3–0	1–0	6–0	1–1	4–1	3–0	2–1	5–1	0–3	0–5	0–3
Chesterfield	1–1	0–3	0–1	4–0	1–2	2–2		4–3	0–3	1–0	3–0	2–3	2–0	2–0	0–1	0–0	1–1	0–2	0–1	3–1	0–2	6–0
Coventry City	3–2	0–1	5–0	3–0	0–0	1–0	3–0		1–0	5–2	1–2	0–1	4–1	0–1	1–1	1–1	0–0	3–1	0–1	1–1	1–0	0–1
Doncaster Rovers	1–2	0–0	3–0	0–0	1–3	2–2	1–0	0–0		0–1	3–0	1–1	0–2	2–2	0–3	2–0	2–0	0–1	1–1	1–1	2–1	1–0
Fulham	0–1	1–1	0–0	5–0	1–1	4–1	0–0	0–2	0–0		3–2	3–1	1–1	1–0	3–0	0–0	1–1	0–2	0–2	0–2	0–1	1–1
Leeds United	4–1	0–1	2–0	1–1	5–1	4–0	3–0	2–1	0–0	0–1		3–1	0–2	2–1	3–1	2–2	5–0	2–2	0–0	1–3	3–1	2–1
Leicester City	4–1	0–0	2–0	1–2	2–1	2–1	1–2	2–2	3–2	0–2	2–0		3–2	3–0	2–2	3–1	2–1	2–3	0–0	0–3	1–1	1–3
Luton Town	2–1	0–1	3–3	3–0	1–1	1–1	2–1	2–3	2–1	0–3	6–1	2–1		1–2	2–1	2–1	0–0	1–1	0–2	0–0	1–1	0–0
Millwall	3–3	0–0	0–1	0–1	1–7	0–1	0–2	6–2	1–0	1–2	1–1	0–4	3–1		2–1	2–0	2–0	0–0	3–0	0–0	1–1	1–1
Newcastle United	1–0	1–0	2–0	1–0	1–0	4–1	2–3	0–0	2–0	1–0	4–2	2–0	4–1	1–0		0–2	6–1	4–2	5–0	1–0	3–1	1–0
Nottingham Forest	1–1	0–2	1–2	2–0	2–1	1–2	1–3	4–0	4–2	0–2	1–0	1–0	1–2	5–2	0–0		1–1	0–0	1–1	1–0	3–1	2–1
Plymouth Argyle	1–0	0–3	2–2	0–0	0–0	3–0	1–2	1–0	2–2	3–2	1–0	0–0	1–3	1–1	3–0	1–1		0–2	3–1	1–1	2–1	1–1
Sheffield Wednesday	5–2	0–0	3–1	1–1	2–2	2–1	1–0	1–1	2–0	2–0	3–1	1–1	1–0	3–2	1–0	2–1	1–1		1–2	1–0	1–2	5–3
Southampton	4–1	2–0	1–2	2–1	1–0	2–2	3–0	3–1	6–1	1–0	1–2	3–1	3–1	5–1	4–2	2–1	2–3	3–1		1–1	1–1	3–1
Tottenham Hotspur	0–3	1–2	3–1	4–0	2–2	2–1	3–0	2–1	2–0	0–2	3–1	0–0	0–1	3–2	1–1	0–3	2–0	5–1	0–0		1–1	2–2
West Bromwich Albion	0–2	1–1	6–0	3–2	3–3	2–3	1–0	3–1	1–3	2–1	3–2	1–3	1–0	2–1	0–1	3–2	1–1	1–1	1–0	1–0		1–2
West Ham United	2–1	0–0	0–0	0–1	2–0	4–2	4–0	1–0	2–1	3–0	2–1	1–1	0–0	1–1	0–2	2–1	1–1	1–4	2–0	1–1	0–2	

Updated to match(es) played on unknown. Source: Ian Laschke: Rothmans Book of Football League Records 1888–89 to 1978–79. Macdonald and Jane’s, London & Sydney, 1980.
Legend: Blue = home team win; Yellow = draw; Red = away team win.

=== Maps ===
Locations of the Football League Second Division London teams 1947–1948
Locations of the Football League Second Division 1947–1948 teams

== Third Division North ==
Football League Third Division North
- Season: 1947–48
- Champions: Lincoln City (2nd title)
- Failed re-election: none
- Matches: 462
- Goals: 1,369 (2.96 per match)
- Top goalscorer: Jimmy Hutchinson (Lincoln City), 32

Pos	Team	Pld	W	D	L	GF	GA	GAv	Pts	Promotion
1	Lincoln City (C, P)	42	26	8	8	81	40	2.025	60	Promotion to the Second Division
2	Rotherham United	42	25	9	8	95	49	1.939	59	
3	Wrexham	42	21	8	13	74	54	1.370	50	
4	Gateshead	42	19	11	12	75	57	1.316	49	
5	Hull City	42	18	11	13	59	48	1.229	47	
6	Accrington Stanley	42	20	6	16	62	59	1.051	46	
7	Barrow	42	16	13	13	49	40	1.225	45	
8	Mansfield Town	42	17	11	14	57	51	1.118	45	
9	Carlisle United	42	18	7	17	88	77	1.143	43	
10	Crewe Alexandra	42	18	7	17	61	63	0.968	43	
11	Oldham Athletic	42	14	13	15	63	64	0.984	41	
12	Rochdale	42	15	11	16	48	72	0.667	41	
13	York City	42	13	14	15	65	60	1.083	40	
14	Bradford City	42	15	10	17	65	66	0.985	40	
15	Southport	42	14	11	17	60	63	0.952	39	
16	Darlington	42	13	13	16	54	70	0.771	39	
17	Stockport County	42	13	12	17	63	67	0.940	38	
18	Tranmere Rovers	42	16	4	22	54	72	0.750	36	
19	Hartlepools United	42	14	8	20	51	73	0.699	36	
20	Chester	42	13	9	20	64	67	0.955	35	
21	Halifax Town	42	7	13	22	43	76	0.566	27	Re-elected
22	New Brighton	42	8	9	25	38	81	0.469	25	Re-elected

Source: rsssf.com
(C) Champions; (P) Promoted

=== Results ===
Home \ Away	ACC	BRW	BRA	CRL	CHE	CRE	DAR	GAT	HAL	HAR	HUL	LIN	MAN	NWB	OLD	ROC	ROT	SOU	STP	TRA	WRE	YOR
Accrington Stanley		0–1	2–0	1–2	1–0	2–1	3–0	1–0	2–0	4–2	2–4	2–1	1–0	5–3	2–3	1–2	0–1	0–0	5–2	1–0	0–2	1–0
Barrow	3–0		0–1	2–0	1–0	2–0	0–0	1–2	2–1	1–2	0–2	0–1	1–0	1–1	2–4	0–1	1–3	2–0	0–0	3–0	1–1	1–0
Bradford City	1–2	1–1		1–1	3–2	1–2	4–0	2–2	2–1	3–1	2–0	2–4	0–1	1–1	0–2	4–0	0–1	4–2	1–0	4–1	1–0	1–3
Carlisle United	2–3	1–2	1–2		2–0	5–2	4–2	1–1	5–2	1–1	0–0	2–5	3–1	2–1	4–1	5–0	0–3	2–3	4–0	4–3	1–2	1–1
Chester	1–0	0–0	2–1	4–1		4–2	1–1	2–3	0–0	2–0	4–1	1–1	1–2	4–2	2–1	2–1	2–3	0–0	2–2	4–0	4–1	2–3
Crewe Alexandra	0–0	1–2	3–2	0–2	1–0		4–1	0–1	0–1	2–0	3–1	3–0	0–0	4–0	2–2	2–1	3–3	4–1	4–2	3–2	1–0	1–3
Darlington	3–1	2–2	1–1	4–3	1–1	0–1		1–1	4–1	1–0	2–0	1–3	1–2	3–1	0–6	0–0	1–1	1–3	0–0	0–2	3–1	1–1
Gateshead	4–2	0–2	2–2	1–3	2–1	2–0	1–2		3–0	7–0	0–1	3–2	2–1	3–1	3–5	5–0	1–1	3–2	1–1	3–0	2–2	0–0
Halifax Town	3–3	1–1	0–0	2–1	1–1	4–1	1–1	0–0		0–0	0–2	0–1	1–1	1–2	1–5	2–3	2–1	0–0	4–0	2–2	0–1	0–1
Hartlepool	4–0	0–3	0–2	1–1	2–1	0–1	3–0	3–2	1–1		3–1	1–2	1–0	1–0	3–1	4–1	2–2	2–0	0–0	1–1	0–2	2–2
Hull City	4–2	0–0	2–1	3–1	2–1	2–1	0–3	2–3	1–2	5–0		0–1	1–1	3–0	1–0	0–0	5–3	1–0	1–0	3–0	1–1	1–1
Lincoln City	2–3	2–1	3–0	3–0	4–2	0–0	3–1	3–0	3–1	5–0	2–3		0–0	1–2	0–2	3–0	3–1	3–1	3–0	2–0	2–1	0–0
Mansfield Town	1–0	1–0	1–1	2–3	2–1	3–1	4–0	1–2	3–1	3–2	1–1	0–2		5–0	1–1	1–1	2–1	2–0	1–2	1–3	1–0	1–2
New Brighton	0–1	1–1	0–2	1–3	0–1	1–2	2–1	1–2	1–0	1–2	1–0	0–1	2–2		2–2	0–0	1–2	2–2	1–0	0–2	1–1	2–1
Oldham Athletic	1–0	2–1	3–0	2–1	3–1	0–0	3–3	0–1	1–1	0–2	0–0	0–0	1–1	3–0		1–1	1–5	1–1	0–0	0–1	1–4	2–2
Rochdale	1–3	2–2	2–0	2–1	2–2	1–2	2–1	2–1	2–1	0–2	1–0	1–1	1–2	1–0	2–0		1–0	2–1	1–2	1–1	2–1	3–0
Rotherham United	1–0	0–0	4–1	7–2	2–1	5–1	0–0	0–0	3–0	3–2	0–0	0–2	2–1	6–1	4–1	4–1		0–2	4–1	2–0	6–0	3–2
Southport	1–1	1–2	1–2	0–4	3–0	2–0	2–0	2–1	2–0	2–0	1–2	1–1	1–1	4–0	4–0	2–2	1–2		0–4	1–4	1–0	2–1
Stockport County	1–1	2–3	3–3	2–3	4–1	2–1	1–3	1–1	2–1	2–0	0–0	1–1	5–0	1–2	3–0	4–0	2–2	0–3		2–0	0–1	4–2
Tranmere	0–1	1–0	2–1	0–3	2–3	2–0	0–1	3–0	0–1	1–0	2–1	1–4	0–1	1–0	1–0	4–1	0–1	2–2	2–3		2–3	4–2
Wrexham	1–1	3–1	4–2	2–1	2–1	1–1	1–2	0–3	6–3	3–1	1–0	3–0	2–1	0–0	1–2	5–1	1–3	2–0	2–0	6–0		3–0
York City	1–2	0–0	3–3	2–2	2–0	0–1	0–2	3–1	6–0	4–0	2–2	0–1	1–2	3–1	1–0	0–0	2–0	3–3	3–2	1–2	1–1	

Updated to match(es) played on unknown. Source: Ian Laschke: Rothmans Book of Football League Records 1888–89 to 1978–79. Macdonald and Jane’s, London & Sydney, 1980.
Legend: Blue = home team win; Yellow = draw; Red = away team win.

=== Maps ===
Locations of the Football League Third Division North teams 1947–1948

== Third Division South ==
Football League Third Division South
- Season: 1947–48
- Champions: Queens Park Rangers (1st title)
- Failed re-election: none
- Matches: 462
- Goals: 1,327 (2.87 per match)
- Top goalscorer: Len Townsend (Bristol City), 31

Pos	Team	Pld	W	D	L	GF	GA	GAv	Pts	Promotion
1	Queens Park Rangers (C, P)	42	26	9	7	74	37	2.000	61	Promotion to the Second Division
2	Bournemouth & Boscombe Athletic	42	24	9	9	76	35	2.171	57	
3	Walsall	42	21	9	12	70	40	1.750	51	
4	Ipswich Town	42	23	3	16	67	61	1.098	49	
5	Swansea Town	42	18	12	12	70	52	1.346	48	
6	Notts County	42	19	8	15	68	59	1.153	46	
7	Bristol City	42	18	7	17	77	65	1.185	43	
8	Port Vale	42	16	11	15	63	54	1.167	43	
9	Southend United	42	15	13	14	51	58	0.879	43	
10	Reading	42	15	11	16	56	58	0.966	41	
11	Exeter City	42	15	11	16	55	63	0.873	41	
12	Newport County	42	14	13	15	61	73	0.836	41	
13	Crystal Palace	42	13	13	16	49	49	1.000	39	
14	Northampton Town	42	14	11	17	58	72	0.806	39	
15	Watford	42	14	10	18	57	79	0.722	38	
16	Swindon Town	42	10	16	16	41	46	0.891	36	
17	Leyton Orient	42	13	10	19	51	73	0.699	36	
18	Torquay United	42	11	13	18	63	62	1.016	35	
19	Aldershot	42	10	15	17	45	67	0.672	35	
20	Bristol Rovers	42	13	8	21	71	75	0.947	34	
21	Norwich City	42	13	8	21	61	76	0.803	34	Re-elected
22	Brighton & Hove Albion	42	11	12	19	43	73	0.589	34	Re-elected

(C) Champions; (P) Promoted

=== Results ===
Home \ Away	ALD	B&BA	B&HA	BRI	BRR	CRY	EXE	IPS	LEY	NPC	NOR	NWC	NTC	PTV	QPR	REA	STD	SWA	SWI	TOR	WAL	WAT
Aldershot		0–3	1–1	1–1	2–0	2–0	0–0	0–1	0–0	1–2	1–1	2–2	1–0	1–1	1–4	1–2	1–1	0–3	2–2	1–0	3–1	1–1
Bournemouth & Boscombe Athletic	1–1		4–1	2–0	3–0	0–0	2–1	4–0	1–1	5–0	2–0	1–3	2–0	3–0	0–1	2–0	0–1	1–0	1–0	6–2	1–1	1–1
Brighton & Hove Albion	1–1	0–2		0–2	3–1	1–1	0–1	4–1	0–0	3–0	2–3	2–0	1–3	2–2	0–5	2–0	1–0	0–1	1–0	2–1	0–4	1–3
Bristol City	2–4	0–4	1–2		5–2	2–0	1–1	4–0	6–0	1–0	1–1	6–0	1–0	2–1	2–1	0–2	6–0	3–2	2–2	1–2	0–0	1–2
Bristol Rovers	7–1	1–2	4–1	0–2		1–1	2–2	2–0	0–2	2–3	1–2	2–3	2–0	2–1	0–1	2–3	1–2	2–2	3–1	0–2	2–3	3–0
Crystal Palace	1–0	2–0	0–0	4–0	0–0		1–2	2–1	2–0	2–1	1–0	2–0	1–1	2–0	0–1	2–1	0–0	4–0	1–1	2–1	2–3	1–2
Exeter City	4–0	1–1	1–0	3–1	4–0	2–0		1–0	1–1	4–4	1–1	2–0	0–1	0–0	1–2	1–0	0–0	3–1	2–1	0–2	0–6	3–1
Ipswich Town	2–0	1–1	4–0	1–0	0–4	3–0	2–0		1–0	3–0	5–2	1–2	2–0	2–1	1–0	1–0	4–0	3–2	0–1	2–1	3–1	1–3
Leyton Orient	0–3	2–0	2–1	0–2	2–4	1–1	2–4	1–1		2–2	5–0	2–1	2–1	0–0	1–3	2–2	2–0	1–0	0–3	4–1	0–1	0–2
Newport County	2–2	2–2	1–1	1–0	2–2	3–1	3–0	3–1	3–2		1–2	1–1	3–1	0–0	0–0	2–0	1–5	1–1	2–0	0–1	4–2	3–4
Northampton Town	2–1	3–6	4–0	0–4	1–3	3–1	3–1	4–2	1–1	1–1		1–0	1–2	4–1	1–1	1–1	2–0	0–1	0–0	1–0	2–1	0–1
Norwich City	0–1	0–1	2–2	2–3	1–5	3–1	3–0	1–5	3–0	1–2	2–3		0–1	1–2	5–2	2–1	1–0	1–2	2–2	1–1	1–0	1–0
Notts County	0–2	1–2	4–0	3–1	4–2	1–0	1–1	0–1	1–4	4–1	3–2	1–2		2–1	1–1	5–1	2–1	5–1	2–1	0–0	1–0	3–3
Port Vale	6–4	2–1	5–0	1–0	1–1	4–1	1–1	4–1	3–0	4–1	1–0	2–0	1–2		0–2	1–0	2–1	1–1	1–0	1–1	0–1	7–0
Queens Park Rangers	0–0	1–0	2–0	2–0	5–2	1–0	3–1	2–0	1–2	1–0	2–0	3–1	4–1	2–1		2–0	3–2	0–0	0–2	3–3	2–1	5–1
Reading	0–0	3–0	1–0	2–7	0–0	0–0	2–1	1–2	6–2	0–0	1–1	2–4	3–1	2–0	3–2		1–3	4–1	2–3	2–0	0–1	2–0
Southend	4–0	0–2	2–2	4–0	1–0	2–1	2–0	3–2	2–1	1–0	3–1	0–0	1–2	1–1	0–0	1–1		1–1	1–0	1–0	1–1	1–1
Swansea Town	2–1	3–2	0–0	6–1	0–1	2–0	2–0	1–1	5–0	3–0	5–1	3–2	1–1	2–0	3–1	1–1	3–0		1–0	1–1	1–1	3–0
Swindon Town	1–0	0–1	1–1	2–2	1–1	0–0	3–2	0–1	0–1	1–2	0–0	3–2	1–1	1–0	0–0	1–1	0–0	1–0		2–2	0–3	3–0
Torquay United	2–0	0–1	1–2	2–3	1–2	3–3	1–2	3–0	0–1	4–1	4–2	1–1	2–2	5–0	1–1	1–2	4–1	1–1	1–1		3–2	0–1
Walsall	3–0	0–0	0–0	2–0	2–0	1–1	4–0	1–2	3–1	1–1	2–0	3–2	2–1	1–2	0–1	0–0	6–0	2–1	1–0	1–0		2–0
Watford	1–2	0–3	2–3	1–1	3–2	0–5	3–1	2–3	2–1	1–2	1–1	2–2	1–3	1–1	0–1	0–1	2–2	4–1	1–0	2–2	2–0	

Updated to match(es) played on unknown. Source: Ian Laschke: Rothmans Book of Football League Records 1888–89 to 1978–79. Macdonald and Jane’s, London & Sydney, 1980.
Legend: Blue = home team win; Yellow = draw; Red = away team win.

=== Maps ===
Locations of the Football League Third Division South London teams 1947–1948
Locations of the Football League Third Division South teams 1947–1948

== Attendances ==
=== Division One ===
No.	Club	Average
1	Arsenal FC	54,982
2	Manchester United	54,890
3	Chelsea FC	47,592
4	Liverpool FC	44,299
5	Everton FC	44,205
6	Sunderland AFC	42,888
7	Manchester City FC	42,725
8	Aston Villa FC	41,431
9	Wolverhampton Wanderers FC	39,636
10	Charlton Athletic FC	36,253
11	Sheffield United FC	35,094
12	Middlesbrough FC	33,901
13	Burnley FC	33,621
14	Stoke City FC	31,590
15	Portsmouth FC	31,226
16	Preston North End FC	30,400
17	Bolton Wanderers FC	29,408
18	Blackburn Rovers FC	27,883
19	Derby County FC	27,044
20	Huddersfield Town AFC	25,548
21	Blackpool FC	25,195
22	Grimsby Town FC	16,031

=== Division Two ===
No.	Club	Average
1	Newcastle United FC	56,283
2	Birmingham City FC	38,365
3	Cardiff City FC	37,871
4	Tottenham Hotspur FC	37,679
5	Sheffield Wednesday FC	35,858
6	West Bromwich Albion FC	30,860
7	Leeds United FC	28,493
8	Leicester City FC	27,110
9	West Ham United FC	24,875
10	Nottingham Forest FC	24,247
11	Brentford FC	23,341
12	Plymouth Argyle FC	23,081
13	Doncaster Rovers FC	22,317
14	Coventry City FC	22,288
15	Millwall FC	21,823
16	Fulham FC	21,437
17	Barnsley FC	21,262
18	Southampton FC	20,789
19	Luton Town FC	17,948
20	Bradford Park Avenue AFC	17,687
21	Bury FC	16,037
22	Chesterfield FC	15,372

=== Division Three ===
No.	Club	Average
1	Notts County FC	25,380
2	Hull City AFC	24,019
3	Queens Park Rangers FC	22,273
4	Norwich City FC	21,444
5	Bristol City FC	20,951
6	Swansea City AFC	17,858
7	AFC Bournemouth	16,854
8	Swindon Town FC	15,829
9	Walsall FC	15,711
10	Bristol Rovers FC	15,036
11	Crystal Palace FC	14,937
12	Rotherham United FC	14,330
13	Reading FC	13,610
14	Port Vale FC	13,569
15	Leyton Orient FC	13,345
16	Ipswich Town FC	13,234
17	Lincoln City FC	13,187
18	Carlisle United FC	13,128
19	Oldham Athletic FC	12,950
20	Mansfield Town FC	11,545
21	Watford FC	11,506
22	Brighton & Hove Albion FC	11,486
23	Wrexham AFC	11,303
24	Newport County AFC	11,240
25	Stockport County FC	11,024
26	Southend United FC	10,129
27	Bradford City AFC	10,104
28	Exeter City FC	9,900
29	York City FC	9,006
30	Tranmere Rovers	8,862
31	Northampton Town FC	8,571
32	Rochdale AFC	8,124
33	Southport FC	8,034
34	Chester City FC	7,870
35	Barrow AFC	7,814
36	Crewe Alexandra FC	7,540
37	Halifax Town AFC	7,508
38	Hartlepool United FC	7,485
39	Torquay United FC	7,186
40	Darlington FC	6,877
41	Aldershot Town FC	6,729
42	Gateshead AFC	6,341
43	Accrington Stanley FC	6,230
44	New Brighton AFC	5,229

== See also ==
- 1947-48 in English football
- 1947 in association football
- 1948 in association football
