= List of Blackpool F.C. players =

The following is a list of notable footballers who have played for Blackpool Football Club. Generally, this refers to players who have played 100 or more Football League matches for the club. Those listed who do not meet this criterion are considered to have made significant contributions to the club's history.

== List ==
Players are listed alphabetically, but each column is sortable. Appearances and goals apply to league matches only; wartime matches are excluded. Substitute appearances included. Names in bold denote current players.

Name	Nationality	Position	Blackpool career	Appearances	Goals
Charlie Adam^{1} ^{2}	Scotland	MF	2009–2011	91	30
Alan Ainscow	England	MF	1971–1978	192	28
Terry Alcock	England	DF	1967–1976	191	21
William Anderton	England	MF	1901–1907	102	10
Jimmy Armfield^{1} ^{3}	England	DF	1954–1971	569	6
Joe Bainbridge	England	DF	1911–1921	114	11
Alan Ball^{1}	England	MF	1962–1966 & 1980–1981	146	45
Dave Bamber	England	FW	1979–1982 & 1990–1994	194	89
Steve Banks	England	GK	1995–1999	153	0
Alex Baptiste	England	DF	2008–2013	170	8
David Bardsley	England	DF	1982–1983 & 1998–2000	109	0
Shaun Barker	England	DF	2006–2009	134	5
Phil Barnes	England	GK	1997–2004	141	0
Matt Barrass	England	MF/DF	1919–1925	168	53
Junior Bent	England	FW	1997–2001	104	5
Bill Bentley	England	DF	1968–1977	296	10
Billy Benton	England	MF	1920–1931	353	24
Harry Bedford^{1}	England	FW	1921–1925	169	112
Bob Birkett^{3}	England	FW	1896–1906	215	44
Danny Blair	Scotland	DF	1936–1939	121	0
Mark Bonner	England	MF	1992–1998	178	14
Gary Briggs	England	DF	1989–1995	137	4
Ian Britton	Scotland	MF	1983–1986	106	15
Allan Brown^{1}	Scotland	MF	1950–1956	157	68
Marvin Bryan	England	DF	1995–2000	184	4
Willie Buchan	Scotland	FW	1937–1948	100	35
Martin Bullock	England	MF	2001–2005	153	4
Ben Burgess	Republic of Ireland	FW	2006–2010	126	23
Dave Burgess	England	DF	1988–1993	101	1
Micky Burns	England	FW	1969–1974	179	53
John Burridge	England	GK	1971–1975	134	0
Tony Butler	England	DF	1996–1999 & 2005–2006	133	1
DJ Campbell^{5}	England	FW	2009–2011	66	30
Louis Cardwell	England	DF	1931–1937	132	6
Sonny Carey	England	MF	2021–2025	133	21
David Carney^{1}	Australia	DF	2010–2011	11	0
Craig Cathcart^{1}	Northern Ireland	DF	2010–2014	112	3
John Charles	England	MF	1912–1924	228	30
Ray Charnley^{1}	England	FW	1957–1967	363	193
Peter Clarke	England	DF	2002, 2004–2006 & 2014–2015	139	16
T. Clarke	England	MF	1906–1912	141	0
Phil Clarkson	England	MF	1997–2002	171	35
Danny Coid	England	DF	1998–2011	263	10
Jimmy Connor	England	DF	1905–1914	281	30
Russell Coughlin	Wales	MF	1987–1990	101	8
Stephen Crainey^{1}	Scotland	DF	2007–2013	214	4
John Craven	England	MF	1965–1971	163	24
Bob Crewdson	England	DF	1904–1913	209	0
John Curtis	England	DF	1973–1977	102	0
Mike Davies^{3}	England	DF	1984–1995	310	16
Nathan Delfouneso	England	FW	2012–2013, 2013–2014, 2014–2015 & 2017–2020	215	33
John Deary	England	MF	1980–1989	285	18
Jock Dodds	Scotland	FW	1939–1946	15^{4}	13^{4}
Kenny Dougall^{1}	Australia	MF	2020–2024	129	8
Percy Downes	England	MF	1925–1931	152	32
Dave Durie	England	FW	1952–1964	301	84
Alex Dyer	England	DF	1983–1987	108	19
Neal Eardley^{1}	Wales	DF	2009–2013	104	2
Tony Ellis	England	FW	1994–1997	147	55
Ian Evatt	England	DF	2006–2013	230	9
David Eyres	England	MF	1989–1993	147	38
George Farm^{1}	Scotland	GK	1948–1960	461	1
George Farrow	England	DF	1936–1948	148	15
Ewan Fenton	Scotland	DF	1946–1959	195	20
Bobby Finan	Scotland	FW	1933–1947	173	85
William Fiske	England	GK	1907–1914	217	0
Paul Gardner	England	DF	1976–1982	152	1
Andy Garner	England	MF	1988–1992	160	37
Tommy Garrett^{1}	England	DF	1946–1961	308	3
Matt Gilks^{1}	Scotland	GK	2008–2014	182	0
Armand Gnanduillet	France	FW	2016–2018 & 2018–2020	118	32
Andy Gouck	England	MF	1990–1996	148	22
Ian Gore	England	DF	1988–1995	200	0
Kaspars Gorkšs^{1}	Latvia	DF	2006–2008	51	7
William Grant	Scotland	DF	1927–1935	220	0
Roy Gratrix	England	DF	1953–1964	400	0
Simon Grayson	England	DF	2002–2005	126	6
John Green	England	MF	1960–1967	135	9
Tony Green^{1}	Scotland	FW	1966–1971	123	13
Colin Greenall	England	DF	1981–1986	183	9
Paul Groves	England	MF	1990–1992	107	21
Jimmy Hampson^{1}	England	FW	1927–1938	361	248
Steve Harrison	England	DF	1971–1978	146	2
Paul Hart	England	DF	1973–1978	143	15
Dave Hatton	England	MF/DF	1969–1976	251	7
Eric Hayward	England	DF	1937–1952	275	15
Iain Hesford	England	GK	1977–1983	202	0
Steve Hetzke	England	DF	1982–1986	140	18
John Hills	England	DF	1994–1995, 1998–2003 & 2007–2008	167	16
Wes Hoolahan^{1}	Republic of Ireland	MF	2007–2008	87	13
Des Horne	England	MF	1960–1966	118	17
Phil Horner	England	DF	1990–1996	187	22
Emlyn Hughes^{1}	England	DF	1964–1967	28	0
Ian Hughes	Wales	DF	1997–2003	160	4
Arthur Hull	England	GK	1902–1906	116	0
James Husband	England	DF	2020–2026	212	5
Tommy Hutchison	Scotland	MF	1967–1973 & 1987–1988	171	10
Tom Ince	England	MF	2011–2014	100	31
Glyn James^{1} ^{3}	Wales	DF	1960–1975	399	22
Harry Johnston^{1} ^{3}	England	DF	1937–1955	398	11
Jimmy Jones	England	DF	1912–1920	113	0
Sammy Jones^{1}	Ireland	DF	1933–1939	165	6
Tommy Jones	England	FW	1933–1938	153	38
Claus Jørgensen	Faroe Islands	MF	2006–2009	100	6
Harold Keenan	England	DF	1913–1922	101	3
Hugh Kelly^{1} ^{3}	Scotland	DF	1943–1960	428	8
Jimmy Kelly	England	DF	1954–1961	200	9
Richard Kingson^{1}	Ghana	GK	2010–2011	20	0
Jordan Lawrence-Gabriel	England	DF	2020–2025	142	5
Leslie Lea	England	MF	1960–1967	160	13
Jimmy Leaver	England	DF	1920–1926	106	4
David Linighan	England	DF	1995–1998	100	5
Stanley Matthews^{1}	England	MF	1947–1961	391	17
Chris Maxwell	England	GK	2020–2023	101	0
Stan McEwan	Scotland	DF	1974–1982	213	24
Sandy McGinn	England	MF	1919–1925	132	2
Steve McIlhargey	Scotland	GK	1989–1993	101	0
John McPhee	Scotland	MF	1962–1970	259	15
Barrie Martin	England	DF	1957–1964	187	1
Georgie Mee	England	MF	1920–1925	216	21
Micky Mellon	Scotland	MF	1994–1997	124	14
Jack Meredith	England	MF	1923–1928	190	27
Harry Mingay	England	GK	1919–1924	155	0
Colin Methven	Scotland	DF	1986–1990	175	11
David Moore	England	DF	1984–1986	115	1
Steve Morgan	England	DF	1986–1990	144	10
Stan Mortensen^{1}	England	FW	1946–1955	317	197
Jackie Mudie^{1}	Scotland	FW	1947–1961	324	144
Alex Munro^{1}	Scotland	FW	1936–1950	136	17
John Murphy	England	FW	1999–2006	229	83
Graham Oates	England	MF	1961–1968	121	26
Brett Ormerod	England	FW	1997–2001 & 2009–2012	212	65
Keigan Parker	Scotland	FW	2004–2008	141	34
Jack Parkinson	England	FW	1896–1910	365	55
Ray Parry	England	FW	1960–1965	128	27
Terry Pashley	England	DF	1978–1983	201	7
Bill Perry^{1}	England	MF	1949–1962	394	119
Brian Peterson	South Africa	FW	1956–1962	101	16
Andy Preece	England	FW	1995–1998	129	35
James Quinn^{1}	Northern Ireland	FW	1993–1998	151	36
Peter Quinn	England	MF	1910–1920	152	16
Paul Rachubka	England	GK	2002–2011	118	0
Stan Ramsay	England	DF	1927–1932	105	2
Clark Robertson	Scotland	DF	2015–2018	121	4
Tony Rodwell	England	MF	1990–1994	137	19
Billy Ronson	England	MF	1974–1979 & 1985–1986	131	12
Graham Rowe	England	DF	1963–1971	105	12
Jack Scott	England	DF	1898–1909	309	15
Eddie Shimwell^{1}	England	DF	1946–1957	283	5
Barry Siddall	England	GK	1983–1989	117	0
Trevor Sinclair	England	MF	1990–1993	112	15
Keith Southern	England	MF	2002–2012	321	25
Jay Spearing	England	MF	2017–2020	104	0
Paul Stewart	England	FW	1981–1987	201	56
Harry Stirzaker^{3}	England	DF	1894–1903	154	14
Ron Suart	England	DF	1946–1949	103	0
Peter Suddaby	England	DF	1970–1980	331	10
Alan Suddick	England	MF	1966–1976	310	65
Ernie Taylor^{1}	England	FW	1951–1958	217	53
Mark Taylor	England	FW	1986–1992	121	43
Scott Taylor	England	FW	1998 & 2002–2004	116	43
Gary Taylor-Fletcher	England	FW	2007–2013	215	36
Tommy Thompson	England	DF	1961–1970	152	1
Percy Thorpe	England	DF	1924–1928	113	5
Edward Threlfall	England	DF	1900–1911	320	10
Billy Tremelling	England	DF	1925–1930	114	43
Bert Tulloch^{3}	England	DF	1914–1924	178	0
Ollie Turton	England	DF	2017–2021	140	2
David Vaughan^{1}	Wales	MF	2008–2011	105	4
Tony Waiters^{1}	England	GK	1959–1967	257	0
Jock Wallace	Scotland	GK	1934–1948	243	0
Mickey Walsh^{1}	Republic of Ireland	FW	1973–1978	180	72
Mike Walsh	England	DF	1984–1989	153	5
Dickie Watmough	England	MF	1934–1937	100	31
Albert Watson	England	MF	1923–1936	373	22
Andy Watson	England	FW	1993–1996	115	43
Phil Watson^{1}	Scotland	DF	1932–1937	171	11
Richie Wellens	England	MF	2000–2005	188	16
Jimmy Weston	England	MF	1975–1980	105	8
Dick Witham	England	DF	1934–1938	149	0
George Wood	Scotland	GK	1971–1977 & 1989–1990	132	0
Jackie Wright	England	DF	1948–1959	157	1
Jerry Yates	England	FW	2020–2023	124	42

== Notes ==
- GK = Goalkeeper
- DF = Defender
- MF = Midfielder
- FW = Forward
- ^1 Represented his country as a Blackpool player
- ^2 Blackpool's record sale
- ^3 Spent entire professional career at Blackpool
- ^4 Only includes pre-War statistics
- ^5 Blackpool's record signing
