= John Green (footballer, born 1939) =

English footballer

Personal information
- Full name: John Green
- Date of birth: 22 May 1939
- Place of birth: Warrington, England
- Date of death: 15 August 2010 (aged 71)
- Place of death: Warrington, England
- Height: 5 ft 9 in (1.75 m)
- Position: Midfielder

Senior career*
Years	Team	Apps	(Gls)
1956–1958	Stockton Heath	18	(13)
1958–1959	Tranmere Rovers	17	(5)
1959–1967	Blackpool	135	(9)
1967–1971	Port Vale	94	(7)
1968	→ Vancouver Royals (loan)	25	(4)
1971–1972	Northwich Victoria		
Total		289	(38)

Managerial career
- 1971–1972: Northwich Victoria (player-manager)
- * Club domestic league appearances and goals

John Green (22 May 1939 – 15 August 2010) was an English professional footballer who played as a midfielder. He played 250 league games in the English Football League.

Green moved from non-League club Stockton Heath to Tranmere Rovers in February 1958. He played 21 league games before he was transferred to top-flight Blackpool in March 1959. He went on to make 145 appearances for the club before he was signed by Stanley Matthews for Port Vale in September 1967. He was allowed to spend the summer of 1968 in Canada with Vancouver Royals, who were then coached by Ferenc Puskás. He returned to help Vale to win promotion out of the Fourth Division in 1969–70 and was also named as the club's Player of the Year. He later served as player-manager of Northwich Victoria in 1971–72.

== Career ==
=== Tranmere Rovers ===
John Green was born and grew up near Warrington, like his lifelong friend Roger Hunt; both played as amateurs for Mid-Cheshire League club Stockton Heath before becoming professional footballers. Green scored on his debut in a win over I.C.I. Alkali and went on to score 22 goals in 25 league and cup games for Stockton Heath. He began his professional career with Tranmere Rovers, signing in February 1958, with the club in the Third Division North. At the end of the 1957–58 season, the Third Division North and South were dissolved and replaced by the Third Division and the Fourth Division. Tranmere were allowed to join the new Third Division, having finished in the top twelve in 1957–58 – they finished ahead of 13th place York City on goal average.

=== Blackpool ===
National service from August 1959 to August 1961 limited his appearances as a Blackpool player in his first few seasons. Green made his debut for Ron Suart's Blackpool on 5 March 1960, in a 4–2 victory at Leeds United. Green went on to make a further six appearances in the 1959–60 campaign. The following season, 1960–61, Green made just one league appearance, on 8 October 1960, as Suart rang the changes following a single-goal defeat at Preston North End in the West Lancashire derby in the previous outing.

In 1961–62, Green made nine league appearances. He also scored his first goals for the club. The first came on 14 April 1962, in a 3–2 defeat at Sheffield Wednesday. A second followed seven days later, this time in a 3–1 victory over Manchester City at Bloomfield Road. Green also made two appearances for the club in the League Cup: firstly in their third-round tie at Workington on 5 November, his strike being the only goal of the game; and secondly in their semi-final second leg game at home to Norwich City on 16 April 1962, which proved to be their elimination match.

Green made twelve league appearances in 1962–63, scoring one goal in the process. It was during the 1963–64 season that Suart gave Green an extended run in the team. He made 23 appearances and scored two goals. In 1964–65, though, he was ever-present throughout Blackpool's 42 league games. He also scored twice. Green returned to being a rotation player in 1965–66, making 26 appearances.

For 1966–67, Green's final season with the club, the midfielder became one of two Greens in the team after the arrival of Tony Green, a Scot, from Albion Rovers. The Englishman made 15 league appearances, a third of which occurred under new manager Stan Mortensen. Green's final appearance for the club took place in the penultimate league game of the season, a 3–1 defeat at home to West Bromwich Albion on 6 May 1967. After maintaining a First Division status during Green's eight seasons with the club, Blackpool were relegated to the Second Division at the end of the campaign. Green had played 145 league and cup games for Blackpool, scoring 11 goals in all competitions.

=== Port Vale ===
In September 1967, Green was signed for Fourth Division Port Vale by Stanley Matthews, who Green had admired from childhood and alongside whom he had played towards the end of Matthews' playing career with Blackpool. He made a 'superb' start to his Vale career and was seen as one of the club's most skilful players. However, he soon lost his first-team place, and made just eleven appearances in 1967–68.

Green then spent May to October 1968 with Vancouver Royals. Although Green was originally recruited by Bobby Robson, by the time he joined the Vancouver Royals, Robson had been replaced as coach by Ferenc Puskás, who made Green captain for his season with the Canadian club. While there, he notched 4 goals in 25 matches as the Royals struggled in the North American Soccer League, and finished bottom of the Pacific Division.

Returning to Vale Park for the rest of the 1968–69 campaign, he found himself working under a new manager in Gordon Lee. Green struggled with his fitness but played twelve games, finding himself on the scoresheet in home wins against Newport County and Chester. He then helped the club to win promotion in 1969–70, and was an ever-present with 46 league and six cup appearances. He was given the club's Player of the Year award for contributing to the campaign. He said that "It came as a complete surprise, all the lads were sure it would be John James". However, he could not translate this success over to the 1970–71 Third Division campaign, and new signings Brian Horton and Tony Lacey established themselves in the first XI. He was not offered a new contract at the end of the season. Green had played a total of 98 league and cup games for Port Vale, scoring a total of 9 goals in all competitions.

=== Later career ===
Green rounded off his career in professional football as player-manager of Northern Premier League side Northwich Victoria for the latter part of the 1971–72 season.

== Career statistics ==
Appearances and goals by club, season and competition
Club	Season	League			FA Cup		Other		Total	
Club	Season	Division	Apps	Goals	Apps	Goals	Apps	Goals	Apps	Goals
Stockton Heath	1956–57	Mid-Cheshire League	16	12	1	2	6	7	23	21
Stockton Heath	1957–58	Mid-Cheshire League	2	1	0	0	0	0	2	1
Stockton Heath	Total		18	13	1	2	6	7	25	22
Tranmere Rovers	1958–59	Third Division	17	5	2	1	—		19	6
Blackpool	1959–60	First Division	7	0	0	0	—		7	0
Blackpool	1960–61	First Division	1	0	0	0	0	0	1	0
Blackpool	1961–62	First Division	9	2	0	0	2	1	11	3
Blackpool	1962–63	First Division	12	1	0	0	0	0	12	1
Blackpool	1963–64	First Division	23	2	0	0	1	0	24	2
Blackpool	1964–65	First Division	42	2	1	0	2	0	45	2
Blackpool	1965–66	First Division	26	2	2	0	2	1	30	3
Blackpool	1966–67	First Division	15	0	1	0	1	0	17	0
Blackpool	Total		135	9	4	0	8	2	147	11
Port Vale	1967–68	Fourth Division	11	0	0	0	0	0	11	0
Port Vale	1968–69	Fourth Division	12	2	0	0	0	0	12	2
Port Vale	1969–70	Fourth Division	46	4	5	1	1	0	52	5
Port Vale	1970–71	Third Division	25	1	1	0	1	0	27	1
Port Vale	Total		94	7	6	1	2	0	102	8
Vancouver Royals (loan)	1968	NASL	25	4	—		—		25	4
Career total			289	38	13	4	16	9	318	51

== Honours ==
Individual

- Port Vale F.C. Player of the Year: 1969–70
- Football League Fourth Division promotion: 1969–70
