= Glyn James =

Welsh footballer

Personal information
- Full name: Edward Glyn James
- Date of birth: 17 December 1941 (age 84)
- Place of birth: Llangollen, Wales
- Position: Centre half

Youth career
- Gobowen Juniors
- Druids
- 1957–1959: Blackpool

Senior career*
Years	Team	Apps	(Gls)
1959–1974	Blackpool	399	(22)

International career
1965–1971	Wales	9	(0)
- * Club domestic league appearances and goals

Edward Glyn James (born 17 December 1941) is a Welsh former professional footballer. He played as a defender. He spent his entire professional career with Blackpool.

James also represented Wales on nine occasions.

== Early life ==
James became a Welshman in unusual circumstances: his parents were both English and lived a few miles from the Welsh border but James was delivered in the nearest nursing home across the border in Llangollen. He was brought up in Weston Rhyn near Oswestry in Shropshire.

He was educated at Oswestry Boys High School, where one of his contemporaries was Alan Ball, Jr who later played alongside James when Ball played for Blackpool during 1961 to 1966. He played for the school team as well as turning out for Gobowen Juniors and the Druids club at Ruabon.

== Club career ==
He was recommended to Blackpool by the former Wales international Billy Matthews, who was a Blackpool scout. He joined the Seasiders as a trainee in December 1957 and signed as a professional in May 1959.

Blackpool manager Ron Suart gave James his Blackpool debut on 28 September 1960, in a goalless draw at Leeds United in the League Cup. He made four more appearances in 1960–61 – three in the League and one in the League Cup.

== Later career ==
Following his retirement from football, James set up a laundry and dry cleaning business and included his former club amongst his clientele.

== Blackpool F.C. Hall of Fame ==
James was inducted into the Hall of Fame at Bloomfield Road, when it was officially opened by former Blackpool player Jimmy Armfield in April 2006. Organised by the Blackpool Supporters Association, Blackpool fans around the world voted on their all-time heroes. Five players from each decade are inducted; James is in the 1960s.

== International career ==
James won nine caps for Wales between 1965 and 1971.

== Career statistics ==
=== Club statistics ===
Appearances and goals by club, season and competition
Club	Season	Division	League		FA Cup		League Cup		Other		Total	
Club	Season	Division	Apps	Goals	Apps	Goals	Apps	Goals	Apps	Goals	Apps	Goals
Blackpool	1960–61	First Division	3	0	0	0	2	0	0	0	5	0
Blackpool	1961–62	First Division	1	0	0	0	0	0	0	0	1	0
Blackpool	1962–63	First Division	7	0	0	0	0	0	0	0	7	0
Blackpool	1963–64	First Division	9	0	0	0	1	0	0	0	10	0
Blackpool	1964–65	First Division	35	0	1	0	2	0	0	0	38	0
Blackpool	1965–66	First Division	37	1	2	1	1	0	0	0	40	2
Blackpool	1966–67	First Division	34	0	1	0	3	0	0	0	38	0
Blackpool	1967–68	Second Division	31	2	1	0	3	0	0	0	35	2
Blackpool	1968–69	Second Division	42	4	1	0	3	0	0	0	46	4
Blackpool	1969–70	Second Division	38	2	3	0	2	1	0	0	43	3
Blackpool	1970–71	First Division	36	1	2	0	2	0	1 (Note: Appearances in the Anglo-Italian Cup)	0	41	1
Blackpool	1971–72	Second Division	39	8	1	0	4	1	5	2	49	11
Blackpool	1972–73	Second Division	34	1	0	0	4	0	4 (Note: One appearance in the Watney Cup and three appearances in the Anglo-Italian Cup)	1	42	2
Blackpool	1973–74	Second Division	42	3	1	0	2	0	0	0	45	3
Blackpool	1974–75	Second Division	12	0	0	0	3	0	0	0	15	0
Career total			400	22	13	1	33	2	10	3	456	28

=== International statistics ===
Appearances and goals by national team and year
National team	Year	Apps	Goals
Wales	1966	3	0
Wales	1967	2	0
Wales	1971	4	0
Total		9	0

== See also ==
- One-club man.
