= Tommy Thompson (footballer, born 1938) =

English footballer (born 1938)

Personal information
- Full name: Thomas William Thompson
- Date of birth: 9 March 1938 (age 88)
- Place of birth: Stockton-on-Tees, England
- Height: 5 ft 8 in (1.73 m)
- Position: Defender

Senior career*
Years	Team	Apps	(Gls)
?–1961	Stockton		
1961–1970	Blackpool	156	(1)
1970–1972	York City	4	(0)
Total		160	(1)

International career
1959–1960	England Amateurs	4	(0)
1959–1960	Great Britain	5	(0)
- * Club domestic league appearances and goals

Thomas William Thompson (born 9 March 1938) is an English former professional footballer. He spent nine years at Blackpool in the 1960s, making more than 150 Football League appearances for the club. He played as a defender, specifically at full back. He also played briefly for York City. He also represented Great Britain at the 1960 Summer Olympics.

== Club career ==
Thompson signed for Ron Suart's Blackpool in August of the 1961–62 season, from Stockton, making his debut on 14 October in a 2–1 victory over Bolton Wanderers at Bloomfield Road. He went on to make a further five league appearances for the club that season. He also made two appearances in their FA Cup campaign, as they reached the semi-finals stage.

The following season, 1962–63, Thompson made three league starts, his only appearances of the campaign.

In 1963–64, with his chances again limited, he made eight league appearances.

It was in 1964–65, however, that he made his breakthrough as a first-team regular. He replaced the departed Barrie Martin at left-back, and went on to appear in 43 of Blackpool's 45 league and cup matches.

Thompson scored his only goal for the club in 1965–66, in a 5–3 home League victory over Arsenal on 16 October, en route to making 36 appearances.

He switched between the left- and right-back berths throughout 1966–67, deputising in the latter position when Jimmy Armfield was unavailable. He made 36 league, one FA Cup and four League Cup appearances.

The 1967–68 season was Stan Mortensen's first full season in charge of Blackpool, after replacing Ron Suart two-thirds of the way through the previous term, and he gave twelve starts to Thompson, plus one appearance as substitute. Thompson did, however, appear in both of the club's FA Cup ties and one of their three League Cup fixtures.

Thompson's final season at Blackpool, 1968–69, saw his make sixteen league appearances, the final one being in a 3–2 defeat at home to Charlton Athletic on 11 January. He spent the 1969–70 season playing in the reserves.

He joined York City, who were then in the Fourth Division, in July 1970 and played four matches for the team, with these appearances coming after an injury to Chris Topping after the opening day of the 1970–71 season.

== International career ==
Thompson made his debut for the England national amateur team on 26 September 1959, in a 1–1 draw with Northern Ireland in the 1959–60 British Amateur Championship. He played in a 2–1 win over Scotland on 26 March 1960, which saw England win the 1959–60 British Amateur Championship. Between 1959 and 1960, Thompson played four matches for the England amateur team.

He first played for the Great Britain Olympic team on 21 November 1959 in a 3–2 win over the Republic of Ireland in a qualifier for the 1960 Summer Olympics. He played in all four of Great Britain's qualifying matches, as the team qualified for the tournament after finishing top of their qualifying group. Thompson was part of the Great Britain squad for the 1960 Summer Olympics, and started in their first match against Brazil. He was stretchered off with a broken leg on 56 minutes with Great Britain leading 2–1, after which the Brazilian team capitalised on their numerical advantage to win 4–3. He did not play again in the tournament, and Great Britain were eliminated after finished third in their group. Thompson made five appearances for Great Britain between 1959 and 1960.

== Honours ==
England Amateurs

- British Amateur Championship: 1959–60
