= Steve Hill (footballer) =

English footballer

Steve "Mandy" Hill

Personal information
- Full name: Stephen Hill
- Date of birth: 15 February 1940
- Place of birth: Blackpool, England
- Date of death: 27 November 2010 (aged 70)
- Position: Winger

Senior career*
Years	Team	Apps	(Gls)
1959–1964	Blackpool	71	(1)
1964–1968	Tranmere Rovers	131	(10)
1968–1970	Wigan Athletic	36	(4)
Total		202	(11)
- * Club domestic league appearances and goals

Stephen Hill (15 February 1940 – 27 November 2010) was an English professional footballer. He played as a forward.

Hill began his career with his hometown club, Blackpool, in May 1959. He made his debut for the Tangerines on 3 October 1959, in a 3–1 defeat to Manchester City at Bloomfield Road, as a deputy for the injured Stanley Matthews. He made a further six appearances in the 1959–60 campaign.

In 1960–61, Hill made ten league appearances, as well as appearing in his first Football League Cup tie – a 3–1 second-round-replay loss at home to Leeds United on 5 October 1960.

Blackpool manager Ron Suart gave Hill an extended run in the team during the 1961–62 season, after Stanley Matthews was allowed to return to Stoke City. He started 36 of the club's 42 league games, and scored his first goal in the process – the second in a 2–0 victory at home to West Ham on 4 September 1961. He also helped Blackpool to the semi-finals of the League Cup, appearing from the second round onwards.

In 1962–63, Hill's appearances were limited due to injury. He started only nine league games. The same applied for the following 1963–64 season, which proved to be his final one for the club. After losing his place to Leslie Lea, Hill made only nine league appearances, the final one occurring on 18 January 1964, in a 2–0 loss at home to Spurs.

Hill joined Tranmere Rovers in September 1964, with whom he scored ten goals in 131 league appearances. He moved to Wigan Athletic in July 1968, where he appeared 36 times in the Northern Premier League during his two seasons at the club.

Hill later managed a TV rental shop in Blackpool. He died on 27 November 2010, aged 70.
