= Graham Oates (footballer, born 1943) =

English footballer

Personal information
- Date of birth: 4 December 1943 (age 82)
- Place of birth: Scunthorpe, Lincolnshire, England
- Position: Midfielder

Senior career*
Years	Team	Apps	(Gls)
1961–1968	Blackpool	121	(26)
1968–1971	Grimsby Town	81	(9)
1971–1973	Wigan Athletic	100	(30)
- * Club domestic league appearances and goals

Graham Oates (born 4 December 1943) is an English former professional footballer who played as a midfielder. He began his career with Blackpool, where he spent seven years, before shorter stints at Grimsby Town and Wigan Athletic. He made 302 Football League appearances, scoring 65 goals.

== Early life ==
Oates began playing football during his years at senior school, mostly around his birthplace of Scunthorpe, Lincolnshire. Aged 14, he signed for Scunthorpe United's under-18s team. His father, uncle and elder brother had all played for the club on a part-time or amateur basis. The following year, he played for Scunthorpe Reserves.

Not wanting to stay in Scunthorpe, due to its industrial nature, he asked for a trial at Blackpool. Aged 16, he went on trial with around 300 others at Blackpool's Stanley Park. The club agreed to sign him, Oates thinks because he had a good left foot. He rejected the club's initial weekly wage offering of £5 because, after paying for his accommodation, he was left with only £1 from each wage packet. They counter-offered with £8, which he accepted. He became Blackpool's first-ever apprentice; prior to this, young arrivals were put on the ground staff. He trained with the first-team squad.

== Career ==
Oates began his career with Ron Suart's Blackpool in 1961. He made his debut for the Division One club on 16 September 1961, aged 17, in a 3–1 defeat at home to Nottingham Forest. He made three more league appearances during the 1961–62 campaign, but scored Blackpool's goal in their 1–1 draw with Leyton Orient in their League Cup second round, first leg tie on 4 October 1961.

In 1962–63, Oates made one appearance in the entire season – a goalless draw at Sheffield Wednesday on 27 October 1962.

The following season, 1963–64, he made 25 league appearances and scored eight goals. On four occasions, a single strike by Oates was enough to give Blackpool a victory: against Fulham at Bloomfield Road on 30 September 1963; against West Bromwich Albion at home on 16 November, against Stoke City, again at Bloomfield Road, on 8 February 1964; and at Nottingham Forest in the very next game seven days later. He also scored one goal in the League Cup, in Blackpool's 7–1 second-round victory over Charlton Athletic at Bloomfield Road on 25 September 1963.

In 1964–65, Oates made 30 appearances and scored twelve goals in the league, finishing second-top scorer behind Ray Charnley.

Oates' strike-rate dried up in 1965–66, with only one goal in 21 league appearances, and in the first two-thirds of the 1966–67 campaign, Ron Suart gave Oates only three starts. Stan Mortensen replaced Suart in the Blackpool hot seat in the New Year, and the former Blackpool striker provided more opportunities in the team. Oates scored in the final league game of the season, a 3–1 victory against Liverpool at Anfield on 13 May 1967. Blackpool, however, had already been relegated to Division Two at that point.

In Stan Mortensen's first full season in charge, 1967–68, Oates made 23 league appearances and scored three goals (all of which came in victories).

Oates' final appearance for Blackpool occurred seven games into the 1968–69 season, in a single-goal victory over Bolton Wanderers at Bloomfield Road on 7 September 1968.

He joined Grimsby Town, with whom he went on to make 81 league appearances and score nine goals in three years.

Oates also played for Wigan Athletic in the early 1970s, scoring 30 goals in 100 Northern Premier League appearances.

=== Post-retirement ===
After retiring from playing football, Oates went into the licensing trade, a move he regretted. He then worked several clerical jobs before working in the logistics department at British Aerospace, a role in which he remained for 26 years prior to retiring.
