= Leslie Lea =

English footballer (1942–2026)

Personal information
- Date of birth: 5 October 1942
- Place of birth: Manchester, England
- Date of death: c. 20 August 2026 (aged 83)
- Position: Midfielder

Senior career*
Years	Team	Apps	(Gls)
1960–1967	Blackpool	160	(13)
1967–1970	Cardiff City	76	(7)
1970–1976	Barnsley	205	(32)
Total		441	(52)
- * Club domestic league appearances and goals

Leslie Lea (5 October 1942 – c. 20 August 2026) was an English professional footballer who played as a midfielder.

== Career ==
Lea began his professional career with Blackpool in 1960, making his debut in the opening game of the 1960–61 league campaign. He scored his first goal for the club in their fourth league game, a 3–1 defeat at Tottenham on 31 August 1960. He made six other league appearances that term, the last one being on 1 October, meaning he sat out the remaining six months of the season.

He didn't feature at all in 1961–62, but the following season, 1962–63, he featured in half of the league campaign. He also scored two goals, in consecutive games as the season drew to a close: firstly in a 3–2 victory over Arsenal at Bloomfield Road on 27 April 1963, and then in a 3–0 win against Manchester City at Maine Road on 4 May.

In 1963–64, Lea made 30 league starts, scoring a solitary goal (in the final league game of the season).

Lea continued to be a regular fixture in Ron Suart's teams throughout 1964–65, making another 30 league appearances and scoring twice, both in victories: 4–2 at home to Blackburn Rovers on 24 August 1964, and 3–1 in Blackpool's hosting of Sunderland on 26 September. He also scored in their League Cup second round win against Newcastle three days earlier.

His goals during the 1965–66 league season all came in victories once more: one in a 2–1 scoreline against Sheffield Wednesday on 27 November 1965; both goals in a 2–1 victory at Leeds United on 26 March 1966; and one in a 3–0 win at home over Northampton in the penultimate game of the league season. He scored in the League Cup for the second consecutive season, again in the second round, but this time in a 5–1 victory over Manchester United, with Ray Charnley netting a hat-trick. His goals could not save Blackpool from relegation, however, and they dropped into Division Two at the end of the season, four months after Ron Suart was replaced as manager by Stan Mortensen.

Lea's final appearance for Blackpool came eighteen games into the 1967–68 league calendar, a 2–0 defeat at home to Norwich City. Stan Mortensen, who had brought in Alan Skirton, sold him to Cardiff City for £20,000 on 15 December 1967. He went on to make 76 league appearances for the Bluebirds in three years, scoring seven goals.

He joined Barnsley in August 1970. In six years at Oakwell, he made over 200 league appearances and scored 32 goals.

== Death ==
On 20 August 2026, it was announced that Lea had died, aged 83.

== Sources ==
- Stats for Blackpool
- Stats for Cardiff
- Stats for Barnsley
- Calley, Roy (1992). Blackpool: A Complete Record 1887-1992. Breedon Books Sport. ISBN 1-873626-07-X.
