= Barrie Martin =

English footballer (1935–2019)

Personal information
- Date of birth: 29 September 1935
- Place of birth: Birmingham, England
- Date of death: 27 February 2019 (aged 83)
- Position: Defender

Senior career*
Years	Team	Apps	(Gls)
1957–1964	Blackpool	187	(1)
1964–1965	Oldham Athletic	42	(4)
1965–????	Tranmere Rovers	102	(0)
- * Club domestic league appearances and goals

Barrie Martin (29 September 1935 – 27 February 2019) was an English professional footballer. He spent seven years at Blackpool in the 1950s and 1960s, making almost 200 Football League appearances for the club.

== Blackpool ==
Martin made his debut for Joe Smith's Blackpool on 28 December 1957, in a 3–2 defeat to Bolton Wanderers. He also appeared in the final league game three days later, another defeat, this time at Tottenham Hotspur.

Joe Smith retired after 23 years as Blackpool manager at the end of 1957–58. His successor for the 1958–59 campaign was former Pool player Ron Suart. Suart gave six league starts to Martin.

It was Martin's third season at Blackpool, 1959–60, that he properly broke into the team. He made 38 league appearances, missing only four games. He also scored his first goal for the club, in a 3–1 victory over Chelsea at Bloomfield Road on 12 December.

In 1960–61, Martin was ever-present in Blackpool's first twelve games of the league campaign, but he went on to miss the next 22. He returned to the line-up on 31 March, with eight games remaining, of which he appeared in six.

Conversely, Martin missed only one league game of the 1961–62 campaign (and one of Blackpool's 52 total games, which included a run to the semi-finals of the League Cup).

He went one better in 1962–63, appearing in all of the club's 47 league and cup games.

Martin chalked up another forty league appearances in 1963–64, his final season at the seaside. His swan song was in the final game of the league campaign, a 4–3 defeat at Ipswich Town on 25 April.
