= Jimmy Armfield =

English footballer and manager (1935–2018)

Jimmy Armfield CBE DL
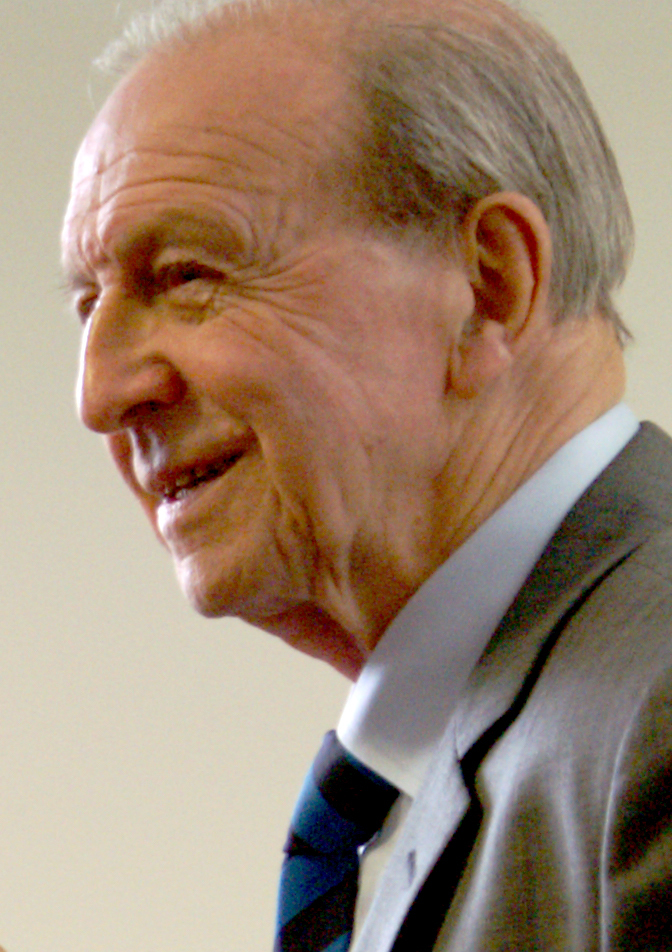
- Armfield in 2012

Personal information
- Full name: James Christopher Armfield
- Date of birth: 21 September 1935
- Place of birth: Denton, Lancashire, England
- Date of death: 22 January 2018 (aged 82)
- Place of death: Blackpool, Lancashire, England
- Height: 5 ft 10 in (1.78 m)
- Position: Right back

Senior career*
Years	Team	Apps	(Gls)
1954–1971	Blackpool	569	(6)
Total		569	(6)

International career
1956–1959	England U23	9	(0)
1959–1966	England	43	(0)

Managerial career
- 1971–1974: Bolton Wanderers
- 1974–1978: Leeds United
Medal record
Men's football
Representing England
FIFA World Cup
Winner	1966 England
- * Club domestic league appearances and goals

James Christopher Armfield (21 September 1935 – 22 January 2018) was an English professional football player and manager. He played the whole of his Football League career at Blackpool, usually at right-back. Between 1954 and 1971, he played 627 games in all competitions, scored six goals, and spent a decade as the club's captain. He also represented the England national team 43 times between 1959 and 1966, and captained them in fifteen games. He was a member of England's 1966 World Cup-winning squad. After retiring from playing, Armfield managed Bolton Wanderers and Leeds United, leading the latter to the 1975 European Cup final.

== Club career ==
Armfield was born in 1935 to Christopher and Doris Armfield. After Armfield's family moved to Blackpool from Denton during the Second World War, he was spotted in a practice match at Bloomfield Road by manager Joe Smith. Armfield, who played on the left wing for that game, scored all of Blackpool's goals in a 4–1 victory. Impressed, Smith offered him a trial. After finishing his studies at Arnold School in Blackpool and obtained his higher school certificate, he joined Blackpool at the age of 17. On 27 December 1954, Armfield made his Blackpool debut at Portsmouth. He recalled of the game: "That League debut at Fratton Park was not, I fear, a very conspicuous one for me. I found myself up against Gordon Dale, a very clever and strong winger with plenty of experience. He was far too good and we lost 3–0. Gordon really gave me the run-around, and I realised just how much I had to learn. They were a very good team in those days, and they scored a goal in about the first two minutes — and I hadn't touched the ball. We were three down after fifteen minutes."

He was part of the Blackpool side that finished in what is to date still the club's highest-ever Football League position when they finished as First Division (then the top flight in England) runners-up in the 1955–56 season.

Armfield was voted Young Player of the Year in 1959. He was awarded Granada TV's Sports Outlook Northern Sports Star of the year trophy in 1961.

In 1966, he narrowly lost out to Bobby Charlton for the Footballer of the Year award and had to content himself with being Blackpool's Player of the Year. Blackpool achieved little success in his seventeen years with them, the club having won the FA Cup the year before his arrival. The exception was promotion to the First Division in 1969–70.

Armfield was awarded a testimonial match, played on 2 September 1970, his 35th birthday, and thousands turned out to pay tribute to him. He played his final game for Blackpool on 1 May 1971, in front of a crowd of over 30,000 against Manchester United at Bloomfield Road, in what would be the last game played by Blackpool in the top flight of English football for almost 40 years. He came back from a ten-game injury lay-off to make his swan-song appearance.

== International career ==
Armfield won 43 caps for England between 1959 and 1966, and captained his country on fifteen occasions. He made his international debut on 13 May 1959, against Brazil in front of over 120,000 fans at the Maracanã Stadium. He played in the 1962 World Cup in Chile, where he was acclaimed as "the best right-back in the world". He was also voted "best right-back in Europe" between 1962 and 1964. However, a groin injury suffered in Blackpool's last match of the 1963–64 season, against Ipswich Town ruled him out of the side for England's busy summer programme. Fulham's George Cohen took the opportunity to establish himself as England's first choice right-back with a series of strong performances, and Armfield was unable to force his way back into the team. He played two further matches in the warm-up to the 1966 World Cup and was included in the winning squad but a toe injury sustained in the pre-tournament appearance against Finland and Cohen's incumbency ensured he played no part in the tournament. His appearance against Finland was his last for his country.

In the 1966 World Cup final only the eleven players on the pitch at the end of the 4–2 win over West Germany received medals. Following a Football Association-led campaign to persuade FIFA to award medals to all the winners' squad members, Armfield was presented with his medal by Gordon Brown at a ceremony at 10 Downing Street on 10 June 2009.

== Management career ==
=== Bolton Wanderers ===
Not long after the end of his playing career, Armfield became manager of Bolton Wanderers in 1971, leading them to promotion to the Second Division in the 1972–73 season as Third Division champions.

=== Leeds United ===
On 4 October 1974, Armfield took the helm at Leeds United, replacing Brian Clough as manager, leading them to the European Cup Final in the 1974–75 season in which they lost 2–0 to Bayern Munich under controversial circumstances. Assisted by Don Howe, Armfield was responsible for rebuilding Don Revie's ageing, but still formidable, side; a task which he achieved with some success. Armfield bought in players such as Tony Currie and Brian Flynn, and under his stewardship Leeds never finished outside of the top ten, qualified for the UEFA Cup, and reached the semi-finals of the FA Cup in 1976–77 and the League Cup in 1977–78. He was dismissed as manager in July 1978, being replaced by Celtic manager Jock Stein.

== Post-management ==
Leeds was Armfield's final managerial role, and he decided to work in the media. He worked as a journalist with the Daily Express from 1979 to 1991. Later he was known as a match summariser for BBC Radio 5 Live. 2009 marked his 30th year on the BBC. To mark the occasion, Armfield picked his personal Top 5 Players from each decade he had been summarising and these were broadcast as part of 5 Live's 2009 FA Cup Final pre-game programme.

He also worked as a consultant with the Football Association and in this role was responsible for the appointment of Terry Venables as England coach in 1994 and was also a key figure in Glenn Hoddle's appointment two years later. In 2000, he was awarded an OBE for services to football and in 2004 he was appointed a Deputy Lieutenant of his home county of Lancashire. In 2005–2006 he served as High Sheriff of Lancashire.

Although born in Denton, Armfield lived mainly in Blackpool, moving there in a Second World War evacuation, and in 2003 he was awarded the freedom of the resort. In 2004, he released his autobiography, Right Back to the Beginning: The Autobiography, which a book review in The Times described as "Authoritative and engaging, but at the same time warm-hearted and kind, there is not a harsh word, and hardly a critical one, in it".

On 23 September 2005, he received a civic reception in Blackpool just after his 70th birthday on 21 September when a tangerine flag was flown from the town hall for the day in his honour.

In 2006, Armfield was awarded with an Honorary Fellowship from nearby Myerscough College, recognising his pioneering contribution to developing the attacking full-back role.

On 22 September 2007, Armfield was the half-time guest at Blackpool's Championship home match against Colchester United. He received a standing ovation, and he thanked the Blackpool fans for their support, which, he said, helped him get through the recent dark days.

On 2 March 2008, Armfield was awarded the Outstanding Contribution honour at the Football League Awards ceremony in London. On 18 September 2008 Armfield was awarded a place in the football Hall of Fame at the National Football Museum in Preston, joining fellow former Seasiders Stanley Matthews and Stan Mortensen in the list of Blackpool players selected. The panel which consisted of Bobby Charlton, Tom Finney and Mark Lawrenson opted to induct Armfield. He was presented with the honour by former England teammate, Jimmy Greaves at the National Football Museum Hall of Fame Night, held in London.

On 27 April 2008, Armfield was awarded the PFA Merit Award at the 35th Annual Awards Dinner at London's Grosvenor Hotel. He received three standing ovations when he got up to accept the award.

In July 2009 he was honoured by Tameside Council in Denton, where he was born, and the Denton and Audenshaw District Assembly presented him with a lifetime-achievement award.

Armfield was appointed Commander of the Order of the British Empire (CBE) in the 2010 New Year's Honours list for services to the community in Lancashire.

Armfield's son, John, also played football, albeit to a less successful level and became a teacher in Lancashire. In October 1980, he signed associated schoolboy forms with Manchester United, but never made a professional appearance before going on to play non-league football for Runcorn, Barrow and Workington.

On 5 May 2012, Armfield presented the trophy to the winning captain. at the FA Cup Final between Chelsea and Liverpool.

Armfield was awarded Global Football Ambassador at the Football Business Awards 2016.

== Health and death ==
On 11 May 2007, Armfield announced on BBC Radio Lancashire that he had been undergoing chemotherapy treatment for non-Hodgkin lymphoma in his throat, and was being advised to rest by his doctors, but he remained positive about his future. The cancer was successfully treated, but returned in November 2016.

Armfield died of the disease in 2018, at the age of 82.

== Recognition ==
Armfield was inducted into Blackpool's Hall of Fame at Bloomfield Road, when it was officially opened by him in April 2006. Organised by the Blackpool Supporters Association, Blackpool fans around the world voted on their all-time heroes. Five players from each decade are inducted; Armfield is in the 1960s.

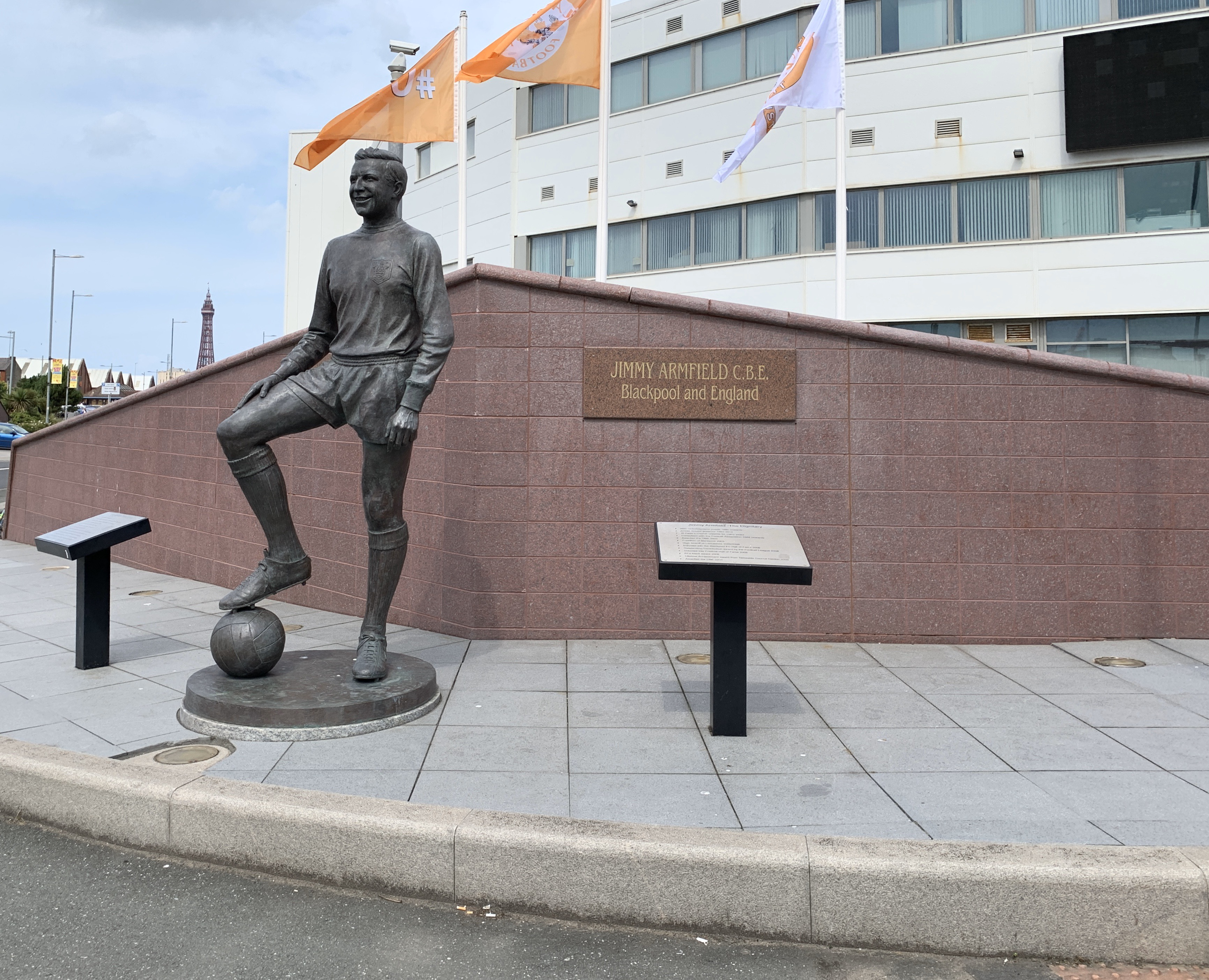
Jimmy Armfield's statue outside Bloomfield Road, pictured in 2019

The South Stand at Bloomfield Road, which was opened on 20 March 2010, is named the "Jimmy Armfield South Stand" with ARMFIELD spelled out in white seats amongst the tangerine majority. A statue of Armfield was commissioned by the Blackpool Supporters' Association in 2009. The nine foot high statue, costing £100,000, is located outside the main entrance, behind the West Stand facing Seasiders Way, and was unveiled by Sir Trevor Brooking on 1 May 2011.

"I feel quite humble about it and I must be honest I will be very proud to see it as I am with the stand, as Blackpool is my team and my town. It is nice to think that anything I have done has been appreciated, all people like to think that."

— Armfield talking in October 2009 about the statue commissioned of him at Bloomfield Road

Armfield Academy, which was built on the site of Armfield's old school Arnold School, was named in his honour following a campaign by former Blackpool mayor Robert Wynne.

On 2 September 2019, The FA unveiled the Jimmy Armfield Briefing Room at St. George's Park in his honour.

== Career statistics ==
=== Club ===
Appearances and goals by club, season and competition
Club	Season	League			FA Cup		League Cup		Total	
Club	Season	Division	Apps	Goals	Apps	Goals	Apps	Goals	Apps	Goals
Blackpool	1954–55	First Division	2	0	0	0	—		2	0
Blackpool	1955–56	First Division	30	0	1	0	—		31	0
Blackpool	1956–57	First Division	38	0	4	0	—		42	0
Blackpool	1957–58	First Division	28	0	1	0	—		29	0
Blackpool	1958–59	First Division	32	0	6	0	—		38	0
Blackpool	1959–60	First Division	41	1	3	0	—		44	1
Blackpool	1960–61	First Division	40	0	1	0	1	0	42	0
Blackpool	1961–62	First Division	37	0	2	0	6	0	45	0
Blackpool	1962–63	First Division	39	0	2	0	2	0	43	0
Blackpool	1963–64	First Division	35	0	2	0	2	0	39	0
Blackpool	1964–65	First Division	40	2	1	0	1	0	42	2
Blackpool	1965–66	First Division	35	1	2	0	2	0	39	1
Blackpool	1966–67	First Division	30	0	0	0	2	0	32	0
Blackpool	1967–68	Second Division	41	1	2	0	2	0	45	1
Blackpool	1968–69	Second Division	34	0	1	0	4	0	39	0
Blackpool	1969–70	Second Division	40	1	3	0	2	0	45	1
Blackpool	1970–71	First Division	27	0	2	0	1	0	30	0
Career total			569	6	33	0	25	0	627	6

=== Managerial ===
Managerial record by team and tenure
Team	From	To	Record				
Team	From	To	P	W	D	L	Win %
Bolton Wanderers	1 August 1971	4 October 1974	180	80	47	53	44.4
Leeds United	4 October 1974	30 June 1978	193	87	47	59	45.1
Total			373	167	94	112	44.8

== Honours ==
=== Player ===
England

- FIFA World Cup: 1966

=== Manager ===
Bolton Wanderers

- Football League Third Division: 1972–73

Leeds United

- European Cup runner-up: 1974–75

== See also ==
- List of one-club men

== Bibliography ==
- Armfield, Jimmy; Collomosse, Andrew (2 February 2004). Right Back to the Beginning: The Autobiography. Headline. ISBN 978-0-7553-1276-4.
