= Brian Peterson (soccer) =

South African soccer player (1936–2020)

Personal information
- Date of birth: 28 October 1936
- Place of birth: Victoria, South Africa
- Date of death: 21 September 2020 (aged 83)
- Place of death: South Africa
- Position: Forward

Senior career*
Years	Team	Apps	(Gls)
1953–1956	Berea	?	(?)
1956–1962	Blackpool	103	(16)
1962–1968	Durban United	172	(71)
1969	Durban City	21	(2)
1970	Durban Spurs United	1	(0)
- * Club domestic league appearances and goals

Brian Peterson (28 October 1936 – 21 September 2020) is a South African professional footballer. He spent six years at Blackpool in the 1950s and 1960s, making over 100 Football League appearances for the club. He played as a forward.

== Playing career ==
As a 17-year-old Brian Peterson, who was playing for Berea Park club in South Africa, was selected for his senior provincial team Natal v Israel.1954.

Peterson signed for Joe Smith's Blackpool from the South African club Berea Park in 1956. He made his debut for the Blackpool late in the 1956–57 season, in a single-goal victory over Chelsea at Bloomfield Road on 13 April. He went on to make four further league appearances before the end of the season.

In the 1957–58 season, Peterson made 25 league appearances and scored four goals, including two in a 5–1 win against Leicester City at Bloomfield Road on Christmas Day. His other two goals also came in victories. He also made his debut in the FA Cup, in Blackpool's third-round defeat at West Ham on 5 January.

In summer 1958, Smith retired after 23 years as Blackpool manager. He was succeeded by the former Blackpool player Ron Suart. Under Suart in the 1958–59 season, Peterson made thirteen league appearances, scoring once.

He made eighteen league appearances in 1959–60, scoring twice.

Sixteen league appearances followed in the 1960–61 season, along with two more goals. He also made one appearance in the new League Cup competition, at Leeds United in a second-round replay.

Peterson appeared in over half of Blackpool's 52 league and cup games in the 1961–62 season, his final season with the club. He scored seven league goals in 24 appearances. He also played his part in Blackpool's run to the semi-finals of the League Cup, making four appearances and scoring one goal in the competition. Indeed, his final appearance for the club was in the first semi-final tie, in which he scored, at Norwich City on 11 April.

After leaving Blackpool, Peterson returned to South Africa to play for Durban United, Durban City and Durban Spurs United.

== Death ==
Peterson died on 21 September 2020, at the age of 83.
