= Ian Moir (footballer) =

Scottish footballer

Personal information
- Full name: Ian Moir
- Date of birth: 30 June 1943
- Place of birth: Aberdeen, Scotland
- Date of death: 26 March 2015 (aged 71)
- Place of death: Chester, England
- Position: Midfielder

Youth career
- 1958–1960: Manchester United

Senior career*
| Years | Team | Apps | (Gls) |
| 1960–1965 | Manchester United | 45 | (5) |
| 1965–1967 | Blackpool | 61 | (12) |
| 1967–1968 | Chester | 25 | (3) |
| 1968–1972 | Wrexham | 150 | (20) |
| 1972–1973 | Shrewsbury Town | 25 | (2) |
| 1973–1975 | Wrexham | 15 | (0) |
| 1975 | Arcadia Shepherds | ? | (?) |
| 1975–1976 | Oswestry Town | ? | (?) |
| 1976 | Colwyn Bay | ? | (?) |
| Total | | 321 | (42) |
- * Club domestic league appearances and goals

Ian Moir (30 June 1943 – 26 March 2015) was a Scottish footballer who played as a midfielder.

Moir played over 300 Football League games for five clubs, including top-flight sides Manchester United and Blackpool, before going on to play in South Africa with Arcadia Shepherds. He returned to Britain and had spells with non-League sides Oswestry Town and Colwyn Bay.

== Career ==
Moir began his career with Matt Busby's Manchester United in 1960. In four years at Old Trafford, he made 45 league appearances and scored five goals.

In 1964, he joined Blackpool, who were then under the managership of Ron Suart. Moir made his debut on 13 February 1965, in a 1–1 draw with Leicester City at Bloomfield Road. He played in the remaining thirteen games of the 1964–65 campaign, scoring four goals in the process.

In 1965–66, he appeared in two-thirds of Blackpool's league games, scoring three goals.

His final season at Bloomfield Road, 1966–67, saw Ron Suart replaced by former Blackpool player Stan Mortensen. Moir made 22 appearances in the league and scored five goals (including two in a 6–0 whitewash of Newcastle United at home on 22 October 1966). He also scored two goals in the League Cup, assisting in Blackpool's reaching the fifth round.

Moir's final game for Blackpool occurred on 27 March 1967, a 2–0 defeat at home to Chelsea.

He left to join Chester, for whom he made 25 league appearances and scored three goals.

In 1968, he joined Wrexham, and went on to make 150 league appearances for the Welsh club.

After a spell with Shrewsbury, Moir returned to Wrexham once more, before moving to South Africa to play for Arcadia Shepherds.

Moir finished his career back in Britain with non-League outfits Oswestry Town and Colwyn Bay. He died in 2015.
