= John McPhee (footballer) =

Scottish footballer (1937–2015)

Personal information
- Full name: John McPhee
- Date of birth: 21 November 1937
- Place of birth: Motherwell, Scotland
- Date of death: 4 January 2015 (aged 77)
- Place of death: Walsall, England
- Height: 1.73 m (5 ft 8 in)
- Position: Defender

Youth career
- –1957: Douglas Water Thistle

Senior career*
Years	Team	Apps	(Gls)
1957–1962	Motherwell	74	(16)
1962–1970	Blackpool	259	(15)
1970–1971	Barnsley	26	(3)
1971–1973	Southport	85	(1)
Total		444	(35)
- * Club domestic league appearances and goals

John McPhee (21 November 1937 – 4 January 2015) was a Scottish professional footballer, who played as a defender.

Nicknamed Chopper, McPhee began his professional career in his native Scotland with his hometown club, Motherwell. In five years, he made 74 league appearances and scored sixteen goals for the club.

In July 1962, he moved south of the border to join Ron Suart's Blackpool. He made his debut for the club on 1 September 1962, in a 1–1 draw at Aston Villa. He made 36 further appearances in the 1962–63 season, scoring six goals.

In 1963–64, he made 30 league appearances and scored five goals (including one in a 2–1 victory over Liverpool at Anfield on 31 August 1963).

After missing the first sixteen games of the 1964–65 campaign, McPhee played in the remaining 26, scoring one goal. At the end of the season, he was voted the club's Player of the Year. He won the accolade again three years later.

During 1965–66, McPhee became Blackpool's first participating substitute when he replaced John Craven after 83 minutes in a 3–0 victory over Leicester City on 14 September. Up until that point, Blackpool had played 713 minutes of the season without using a substitute.

In 1967–68, Blackpool were playing Second Division football after suffering relegation the previous campaign. Stan Mortensen was in his first full season in charge after succeeding Ron Suart, and under his managership McPhee was an ever-present in Blackpool's 47 league and cup games.

He made 38 league appearances the following season, 1968–69, and scored one goal.

Under new manager Les Shannon in 1969–70, McPhee made 29 league appearances in his final season with the club. His last appearance occurred in the final game of the season, a 2–0 league defeat at Oxford United. It didn't matter, however, since Blackpool had sealed promotion back to Division One the previous week.

After over 250 league games for the Tangerines, McPhee was sold to Barnsley at the end of the season. He spent one term at Oakwell before joining Southport in 1971, with whom he finished his career.

John Mcphee’s granddaughter is pop star Suzi Wu

== Post-retirement ==
After retiring, McPhee became a businessman in Blackpool.

McPhee was the owner of the family-run Hotel Sheraton, situated on Blackpool's Queens Promenade.
