= Stanley Matthews =

English footballer (1915–2000)

Sir Stanley Matthews CBE
- Matthews with Blackpool, lifting his 1953 FA Cup final winner's medal to the sky, so that his deceased father could see it.

Personal information
- Full name: Stanley Matthews
- Date of birth: 1 February 1915
- Place of birth: Hanley, Stoke-on-Trent, England
- Date of death: 23 February 2000 (aged 85)
- Place of death: Newcastle-under-Lyme, England
- Height: 5 ft 9 in (1.75 m)
- Position: Outside right

Youth career
- 1930–1932: Stoke City

Senior career*
Years	Team	Apps	(Gls)
1932–1947	Stoke City	259	(51)
1947–1961	Blackpool	379	(17)
1961	→ Toronto City (loan)	14	(0)
1961–1965	Stoke City	59	(3)
1965	→ Toronto City (loan)	6	(0)
Total		717	(71)

International career
1929	England Schoolboys	1	(0)
1934–1956	The Football League XI	13	(2)
1934–1957	England	54	(11)
1947–1965	United Kingdom	3	(0)

Managerial career
- 1967–1968: Port Vale
- 1970–1971: Hibernians
- * Club domestic league appearances and goals

Sir Stanley Matthews (1 February 1915 – 23 February 2000) was an English footballer who played as an outside right. Often regarded as one of the greatest English players, he is the only player to have been knighted while still playing football, as well as being the first winner of both the European Footballer of the Year and the Football Writers' Association Footballer of the Year awards. His nicknames included "The Wizard of Dribble" and "The Magician".

Matthews kept fit enough to play at the top level until he was 50. He was also the oldest player to play in England's top football division (50 years and 5 days) and the oldest to represent the country (42 years and 104 days). He was an inaugural inductee to the English Football Hall of Fame in 2002 to honour his contribution to the English game.

Matthews spent 19 years with Stoke City, playing for the Potters from 1932 to 1947 and again from 1961 to 1965. He helped Stoke to the Second Division title in 1932–33 and 1962–63. Between his two spells at Stoke, he spent 14 years with Blackpool, where, after being on the losing side in the 1948 and 1951 FA Cup finals, he helped Blackpool to win the cup with a formidable personal performance in the "Matthews final" of 1953. In 1956, he was named the winner of the inaugural Ballon d'Or, a prize given to the best European footballer each year. Between 1934 and 1957, he won 54 caps for England, playing in the FIFA World Cup in 1950 and 1954, and winning nine British Home Championship titles.

Following an unsuccessful stint as Port Vale's general manager between 1965 and 1968, he travelled around the world, coaching enthusiastic amateurs. His experiences included coaching in South Africa, where, despite the harsh apartheid laws of the time, he established an all-black team in 1975 in Soweto known as "Stan's Men".

Including wartime results and appearances in reserve teams, he made over 1,150 appearances in his career.

== Family and early life ==
Stanley Matthews was born on 1 February 1915 in a terraced house in Seymour Street, Hanley, Stoke-on-Trent, Staffordshire. He was the third of four sons born to Jack Matthews, a local boxer known as the "Fighting Barber of Hanley". In the summer of 1921, Jack Matthews took six-year-old Stanley to the Victoria Ground, home of the local club Stoke City, for an open race for boys under the age of 14, with a staggered start according to age. His father placed a bet on his son winning, and he did. Matthews attended Hanley's Wellington Road School and later described himself as "in many respects a model pupil". He also said the kickabout games the children played helped to improve his dribbling and prepared the children for future life by giving them "a focus, a purpose, discipline, and in many respects an escape". At home he also spent "countless hours" practising dribbling around kitchen chairs he placed in his backyard.

Though he would later become indelibly associated with Stoke City, Matthews grew up supporting that club's local rivals Port Vale. His father wanted him to follow in his footsteps and become a boxer, but Stanley decided at the age of 13 that he wanted to be a footballer. After a rigorous training session that made Matthews vomit, his mother, Elizabeth, stood firm and made Jack realise that his son, who had one more year at school, should follow his passion for football. His father conceded that should he be picked for England Schoolboys then he could continue his footballing career; around this time his school football master picked Matthews as an outside-right, rather than as his then-preferred position of centre-half. Matthews played for England Schoolboys against Wales in 1929, in front of around 20,000 spectators at Dean Court, Bournemouth.

== Playing career ==
=== Stoke City ===
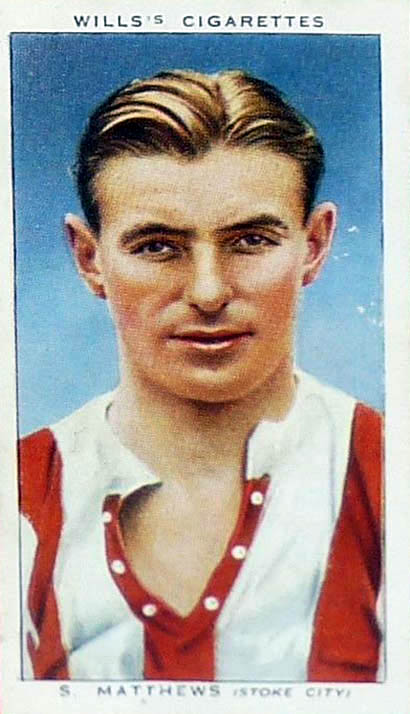
Matthews on a football card in 1939

Wolverhampton Wanderers, Birmingham City, Aston Villa and West Bromwich Albion were all rumoured to be interested in Matthews in the wake of his appearance for England Schoolboys. The Stoke City manager Tom Mather persuaded Matthews' father to allow Stanley to join his club's staff as an office boy on his 15th birthday for pay of £1-a-week. Matthews played for Stoke's reserve team during the 1930–31 season, coming up first against Burnley. After the game, his father gave his usual realist assessment: "I've seen you play better and I've seen you play worse".

Matthews played 22 reserve games in 1931–32, shunning the social scene to focus on improving his game. In one of these games, against Manchester City, he attempted to run at the left-back and take him on with a deft swerve as the defender committed himself to a challenge, rather than follow the accepted wisdom of the day which was first to wait for the defender to run at the attacker – his new technique "worked a treat". The national press were already predicting a bright future for the teenager, and though he could have then joined any club in the country, he signed as a professional with Stoke on his 17th birthday. Paid the maximum wage of £5-a-week (£3 in the summer break), he was on the same wage as seasoned professionals before he even kicked a ball. Despite this, his father insisted that Matthews save this money and only spend any winning bonus money he earned. He made his first-team debut against Bury at Gigg Lane on 19 March 1932; the "Potters" won the game 1–0 and Matthews learned how physical and dirty opponents could be – and get away with it.

After spending the 1932–33 pre-season training intensely by himself (as opposed to playing golf with his teammates), Mather selected Matthews in 15 games, enough to earn him in a winners medal after Stoke were crowned Second Division champions, one point ahead of Tottenham Hotspur. On 4 March 1933 he scored his first senior goal in a 3–1 win over local rivals Port Vale at the Old Recreation Ground.

He played 29 First Division games in 1933–34, as Stoke secured their top-flight status with a 12th-place finish. Matthews added a Staffordshire Senior Cup winners' medal in 1934. He continued to progress in the 1934–35 campaign and was selected by The Football League for an Inter-League game with the Irish League at The Oval, which finished 6–1 to the English. His England debut followed, and so did a further game for the Football League against the Scottish League. Stoke finished the season in 10th place.

In 1935–36, Matthews continued to improve, adding the double body swerve technique to his increasing arsenal of tricks. Largely out of the international picture, he put in 45 games for the "Potters" as Stoke finished fourth under Bob McGrory – the club's best finish. He played 42 games in 1936–37, including the club's record 10–3 win over West Brom at the Victoria Ground. At the end of the season, he was paid a loyalty bonus of £650, though the Stoke board initially insisted he was only due £500 as he had spent his first two years at the club as an amateur – this attitude left a sour taste in Matthews' mouth.

Stoke slipped down the league in an extremely tight 1937–38 season, and, annoyed by rumours circulating the city of resentment in the dressing room against him for his England success, Matthews requested a transfer in February; his request was denied. His request became public knowledge, and, disturbed by the attention and harassment he was receiving from Stoke supporters urging him to stay, Matthews decided to take a few days off from the club to relax in Blackpool. Finding no peace there either, Stoke chairman Albert Booth told Matthews he would not be allowed to leave the club, and 3,000 City supporters organised a meeting to make their feelings known; they too demanded that he stay. Touched by their strength of feeling and worn out by the attention he was receiving, Matthews agreed to stay. Despite playing regularly for the national side, Matthews put in 38 games for Stoke in 1938–39, helping them to a seventh-place finish. There would not be another full season of Football League action until 1946.

=== Wartime career ===
The war cost Matthews his professional career from the age of 24 to the age of 30. He instead joined the Royal Air Force and was based just outside Blackpool, with Ivor Powell his NCO. He rose to the rank of corporal, though he admitted to being one of the most lenient and easy-going NCOs in the forces. He played 69 Wartime League and Cup games for Stoke and also made 87 guest appearances for Blackpool. In addition to these he made appearances for several other clubs, including one for Welsh side Wrexham. He also played a handful of games for Scottish sides Airdrieonians, Morton and Rangers, where he collected a Charity Cup winners' medal, and also played for an unofficial Scotland XI, Arsenal against Millwall on 13 January 1945 plus FC Dynamo Moscow on 21 November 1945 in extremely thick fog. He also played 29 times for England, though no caps were awarded as these were unofficial games.

One of the last games of the period was an FA Cup sixth round second-leg tie clash between Stoke and Bolton Wanderers; the match ended in tragedy in a "Crowd Crush" known as the Burnden Park disaster – 33 people died and 500 were injured. Matthews sent £30 to the disaster fund and could not bring himself to train for several days afterwards.

Matthews' father died in 1945. From his deathbed, he made his son promise him two things: to look after his mother and to win an FA Cup final.

=== Post-war resumption with Stoke ===
The regular Football League returned in time for the 1946–47 season, during which Matthews played 23 league games and contributed to 30 of the club's 41 league goals. Stoke matched their record finish of fourth in the league, finishing just two points shy of champions Liverpool after losing to Sheffield United on the final day of the season. However, in February, Matthews was returning from a knee injury when manager McGrory told him he was not in the first XI for the game against Arsenal; the press reported this as a bust-up. Relations between McGrory, the Stoke City board, and Matthews had indeed always been sour, though once again a story that the players sided against Matthews was untrue. Recalled against Brentford, only after the game did he find out that this was only because he was a last-minute replacement for an injured Bert Mitchell. Matthews put in a second transfer request, which the Stoke board eventually accepted. He selected Blackpool as his next club as he still lived in the area following his service in the RAF; the Stoke board sanctioned the move on the condition that the deal was to remain a secret until the end of the season, not to disrupt the club's title bid. The secret was revealed in a matter of hours by an unknown person informing the press.

=== Blackpool ===
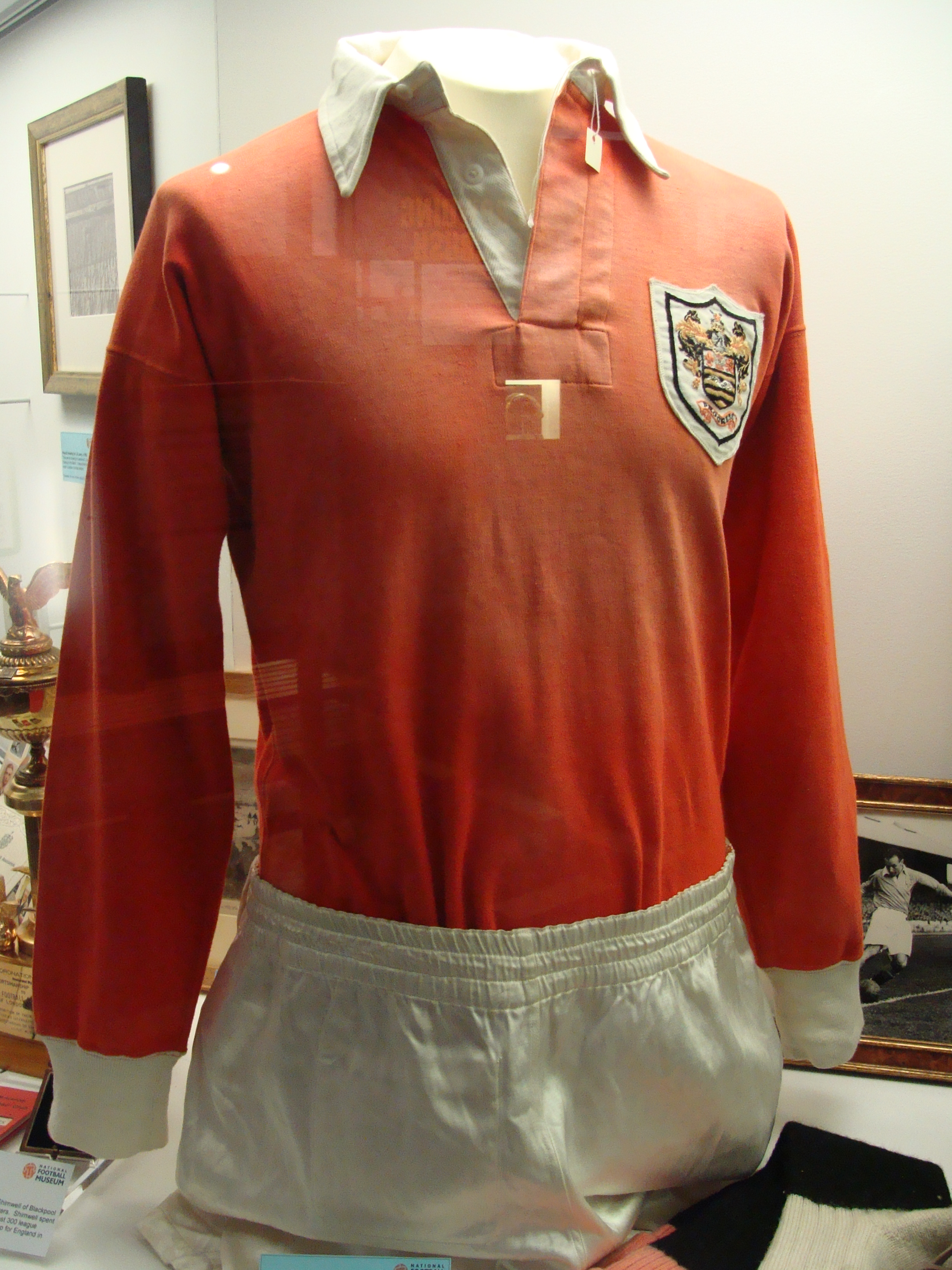
Matthews's jersey for FA Cup final 1953

On 10 May 1947, immediately after a Great Britain versus Rest of Europe match in Glasgow (Britain won 6–1), he made the move for £11,500, at the age of 32. The match raised £30,000 for the four Home Nations Football Associations, and since the eleven British players received £14 each, Matthews questioned where exactly this money ended up – he doubted that much of it ended up as funding for grass-roots football.

"You're 32, do you think you can make it for another couple of years?" – Blackpool manager Joe Smith in 1947.

Smith told Matthews, "There are no shackles here ... express yourself ... play your own game and whatever you do on the pitch, do it in the knowledge that you have my full support." He assembled a talented frontline in Matthews, Stan Mortensen, Jimmy McIntosh, and Alex Munro; with an emphasis on entertaining football. The Seasiders finished in ninth place and reached the 1948 FA Cup final. On 23 April 1948, the eve of the final, Matthews won the inaugural Football Writers' Association Footballer of the Year award. Despite taking the lead twice in the match, Blackpool lost out 4–2 to Matt Busby's Manchester United in the final, with Matthews assisting Mortensen for Blackpool's second.

Injury limited him to only 28 appearances in 1948–49, as Blackpool struggled to a 16th-place finish. He spent the summer touring theatres in a variety act with his brother Ronnie, though he was troubled by an ankle injury he picked up in a charity game. Blackpool finished seventh in 1949–50, and though they were never title contenders, vast crowds still turned out home and away to witness the entertaining football they displayed. At this time he received the maximum wage allowed for a professional player – £12 a week.

In 1950–51 Blackpool stormed to a third-place finish, and Matthews played 44 games in league and cup. He cited his highlights of the season as a 2–0 win at Sunderland, a 4–4 draw at Arsenal, and a 4–2 defeat at Newcastle United. They also reached the 1951 FA Cup final, where they were favourites to beat opponents Newcastle; However, Matthews ended up with a second runners-up medal thanks to a brace from Jackie Milburn.

After picking up an ankle injury in November, he missed most of the 1951–52 campaign and was forced to spend most of his time instead working at the hotel he and his wife ran. It was during this time that he cut red meat from his diet to begin his new near-vegetarian diet. At this point new Stoke manager Frank Taylor enquired as to whether he might bring Matthews back to the club; all parties agreed to the idea in principle until Joe Smith put his foot down to ensure he stayed, with an inspirational speech he promised Matthews that an FA Cup winners medal was still possible, telling him that "a lot of people think I'm mad, but even though you're 37, I believe your best football is still to come."

Despite spending some three months of the season out with a muscle injury, the 1952–53 campaign proved Smith's words to be accurate, as a 38-year-old Matthews won an FA Cup winners medal in a match which was, despite Mortensen's hat-trick, subsequently dubbed the "Matthews final". Bolton were leading 3–1 with 35 minutes to go, but Matthews had "the game of his life" in "the greatest ever FA Cup final" and spurred his team on to a last gasp 4–3 victory. He always credited the team and especially Mortensen for the victory and never accepted the nickname of the "Matthews final".

He helped the Tangerines to record a sixth-place finish in 1953–54, though hopes of retaining their FA Cup title were ended with a defeat to Port Vale at Vale Park in the fifth round. Matthews missed just eight league games in 1954–55, though journalists were keen to write him off with every occasional off-performance and missed game – "it was all balderdash", he replied. Despite his age, and more pertinently the media's constant references to his age, Arsenal manager Tom Whittaker tried, unsuccessfully, to lure Matthews to Highbury with a lucrative, if somewhat illegal approach.

As Smith began to establish a new side with talents such as Jackie Mudie and Jimmy Armfield, Blackpool posted a second-place finish in 1955–56. However, they ended up some 11 points behind champions Manchester United. Matthews believed that the performance he gave in a 3–1 win over Arsenal on the season's opening day was the finest he ever gave. At the end of the campaign, Matthews was named the winner of the inaugural European Footballer of the Year award, having narrowly defeated Alfredo Di Stéfano 47 to 44 in the poll.

Remaining a key first-team member in 1956–57, injury restricted him to 25 league appearances, though Blackpool claimed a creditable fourth-place finish. Matthews scored his 18th and final goal for Blackpool in a 4–1 league victory over Tottenham Hotspur at Bloomfield Road on 3 September 1956. Blackpool finished seventh in 1957–58, after which Joe Smith left the club.

In 1957, at the age of 42, Matthews travelled to Ghana to play some exhibition games for Ghanaian club Hearts of Oak. On 26 May 1957, Matthews made his 'debut' for Hearts of Oak at Accra Sports Stadium against Asante Kotoko in front of 20,000 spectators. Similar attendances were recorded for Matthews' next two games against Sekondi Hasaacas and Kumasi Cornerstone. As a result of Matthews' visit to the country, he was installed as a "soccerhene" (soccer chief). Matthews' visit to Ghana also convinced Ghana's first prime minister Kwame Nkrumah that sport could help the development of Ghanaian football, as well as push the ideals of Pan-Africanism. Ghana won their first Africa Cup of Nations six years later in 1963 under the management of Charles Gyamfi.

Back in England, Smith's replacement was Ron Suart, who wanted Matthews to stay out wide and did not value his contribution as Smith did. Suart limited Matthews to 19 league appearances in 1958–59. Matthews was then used just 15 times in 1959–60, as Suart signed Arthur Kaye to take his place. Local lad Steve Hill also vied for the outside-right position. He enjoyed more games in 1960–61, playing 27 league games as the club narrowly avoided relegation by the odd point.

In 1961, during the English off-season, he played abroad in the Eastern Canada Professional Soccer League with Toronto City, appearing in 14 matches. He returned for the 1965 season, playing in another five matches for Toronto City.

He started the 1961–62 season behind Hill in the pecking order, only getting his place back in time for a 4–0 win over Chelsea after Hill picked up an injury. He made his 440th and final appearance in a Blackpool shirt in a 3–0 defeat at Arsenal on 7 October 1961. It was a fitting final bow as he always enjoyed playing against Arsenal. He had "so many wonderful memories" at Highbury. With former teammate and close friend Jackie Mudie at Stoke City, and with Tony Waddington keen to welcome Matthews back to the Victoria Ground, his return to his home-town club was sealed. However, Matthews was not impressed when the Blackpool board demanded a £3,500 transfer fee, with one director being so bold as to tell him "You forget. As a player, we made you." Having kept secret from Stoke a niggling knee injury Matthews had been carrying, Blackpool got their £3,500 for the player.

=== Return to Stoke ===
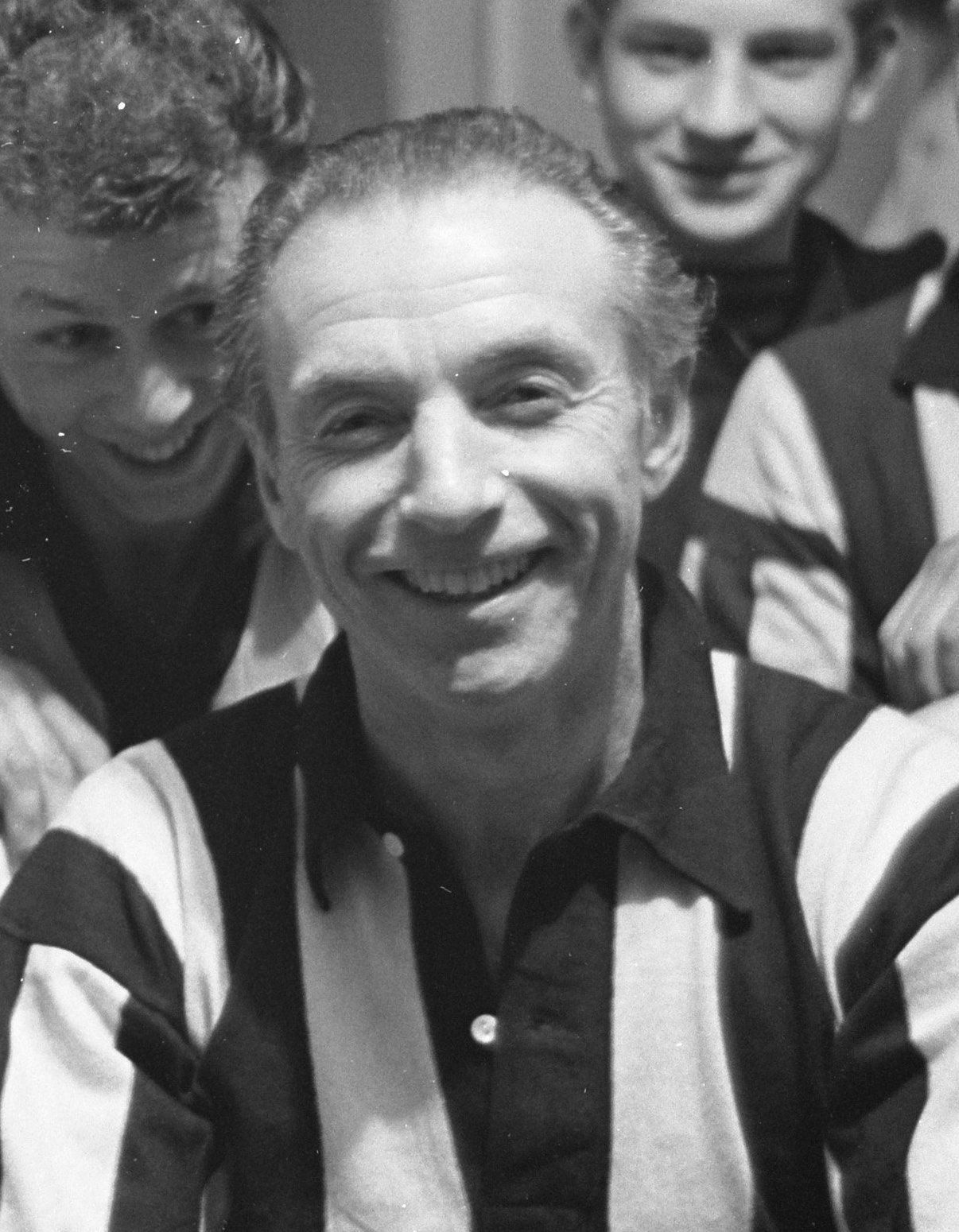
Matthews in 1962

At Stoke, Matthews played Second Division football for the first time in 28 years. Despite Stoke being strapped for cash, Tony Waddington gave him a two-year contract at £50-a-week; this was double the wages he received at Blackpool. The signing was broadcast live on Sportsview, as Waddington whispered in his ear "Welcome home, Stan. For years this club has been going nowhere. Now we're on our way". Waddington delayed his return debut until 24 October 1961, when Stoke played Huddersfield Town at the Victoria Ground, the attendance was 35,974 – more than treble the previous home game – and Matthews set up one of City's goals in a 3–0 win. He went on to score three goals in 21 games in the rest of the 1961–62 campaign.

Waddington signed hardman Eddie Clamp to protect Matthews in the 1962–63 season, and the two would also become close friends off the pitch. Along with veteran teammates Jackie Mudie, Jimmy O'Neill, Eddie Stuart, Don Ratcliffe, Dennis Viollet, and Jimmy McIlroy, Stoke had the oldest team in the Football League. Matthews scored his only goal of the season in the final home game of the campaign, as Luton Town were beaten 2–0, the result ensured Stoke gained promotion to the top flight. Stoke went up as Second Division champions. Matthews was voted FWA Footballer of the Year for the second time in his career, 15 years after he was made the award's inaugural winner. When he was 48, he picked up this award, and he became the oldest award winner by a wide margin, which remains so more than half a century later.

After picking up an injury, he missed January onwards of the 1963–64 campaign and thereby missed the 1964 Football League Cup final defeat to Leicester City, playing in just nine of Stoke's 42 First Division matches that season. Discovering that niggling injuries, which would have cost him one day out of action, now required more than two weeks' worth of rest to recover from, Matthews decided to retire after one more season, taking his playing career into his 50th year.

He spent the 1964–65 season playing for the reserve side. On 1 January 1965, he became the only footballer to ever be knighted (for services to football) whilst still an active professional player. However, he never thought himself worthy of such an honour. His only first-team appearance of the season was also the last Football League game of his career; it came on 6 February 1965, just after his 50th birthday, and was necessitated by injuries to both Peter Dobing and Gerry Bridgwood. The opponents that day were Fulham, and Stoke won the game 3–1. Though he felt he had retired too early and could have carried on playing for another two years, this brought an end to his 35-year professional career.

Stoke City arranged a testimonial match in honour of Matthews; it was much needed as he had spent most of his career constricted to the tight maximum wage that had been enforced upon the English game and only abolished a few years before his retirement. The game was played at the Victoria Ground on 28 April 1965. By that time, Matthews had decided to retire as a player, and the pre-match entertainment consisted of another match of two veteran teams featuring many legends of the game. Harry Johnston led out a team consisting of Bert Trautmann, Tim Ward, George Hardwick, Jimmy Hill, Neil Franklin, Don Revie, Stan Mortensen, Nat Lofthouse, Jimmy Hagan, Tom Finney and Frank Bowyer (reserve). Walley Barnes led out an opposing team consisting of Jimmy O'Neill, Jimmy Scoular, Danny Blanchflower, Jimmy Dickinson, Hughie Kelly, Bill McGarry, Jackie Mudie, Jackie Milburn, Jock Dodds, Ken Barnes, and Arthur Rowley (reserve).

In the main game itself, two teams of legends were formed, a Stan's XI (consisting of Football League players) and an International XI (including Ferenc Puskás, Alfredo Di Stefano, Josef Masopust and Lev Yashin). The International side won 6–4, and Matthews was carried shoulder-high from the field at full time by Puskás and Yashin.

=== England international career ===
After playing for England Schoolboys, playing in a trial at Roker Park in front of the England selectors, and representing The Football League, Matthews was given his England debut at Ninian Park in 1934. Matthews scored the third goal as England beat the Welsh 4–0. His second game would be the infamous Battle of Highbury, where he set up Eric Brook for the first goal of a 3–2 win over world champions Italy.

His third cap came in a 3–0 over Germany at White Hart Lane on 4 December 1935, after Ralph Birkett was unable to play due to injury; Matthews was outplayed by his opposite number Reinhold Münzenberg in both attack and defence. Matthews was jeered by England supporters and condemned by the press.

He would have to wait until 17 April 1937 for another chance in an England shirt, when he was selected to play in front of 149,000 spectators against the auld enemy at Scotland's Hampden Park. He was physically sick before the match, as he would be before any big game. The "Hampden Roar" a big factor; the Scots won 3–1 despite a good English performance. After another game against Wales, Matthews scored a hat-trick in a 5–4 win against Czechoslovakia.

In 1938 he played eight games for England, starting with defeat to a Scotland team containing a young Bill Shankly. He then travelled to Berlin for another encounter with Münzenberg, where pre-match he witnessed first hand the foreboding devotion the people showed the Führer when his motorcade drove past a café the England team were dining in. The game became infamous as The FA, themselves under instruction from the British government, informed the England team that they had to perform the Nazi salute as part of the strategy of appeasement. England won 6–3 with Matthews himself getting on the scoreboard having got the better of Münzenberg this time. The next game was a shock 2–1 defeat to Switzerland, which in turn was followed by a 4–2 win over France in Paris. Following the conclusion of this summer tour of the continent, Matthews scored in a 4–2 defeat to Wales in Cardiff, and then played in England's 3–0 win over a Europe XI at Highbury, their 4–0 win over Norway in Newcastle, and their 7–0 win over Ireland at Old Trafford.

On 15 April 1939, he returned to a muddy Hampden Park with England to claim a 2–1 victory in front of 142,000 rain-soaked supporters; he set up Tommy Lawton for the winner with seconds to spare. That summer was the last time England would tour Europe before Hitler's Nazis were defeated. The first game was against Italy, who gave the English a warm reception despite Benito Mussolini's breast-beating and the bad blood of five years previous. Again, the World Champions, the Italians, managed to salvage a 2–2 draw at the San Siro after scoring with a clear handball; this time Matthews left the field with a chipped hip bone for his efforts. The next game was a 2–1 loss to Yugoslavia, with Matthews and captain Eddie Hapgood passengers in the game after picking up early injuries; this injury forced him to sit out the following encounter with Romania.

Following the war, his return for England came against Scotland on 12 April 1947 at Wembley, in a match which finished as a 1–1 draw. In the summer he took part in England's tour of Switzerland and Portugal. Following a surprise defeat to the Swiss, England cantered to a 10–0 win over the Portuguese, with Matthews scoring the 10th. In September, he put in one of his finest performances in an England shirt as he set up all of England's five goals in a 5–2 victory over Belgium.

In April 1948, he once again travelled with England to Hampden Park, helping his country to a 2–0 victory. However, after the match, he was the subject of an FA inquiry after he claimed tea and scones on his expenses (at the cost of sixpence). Regardless of this treatment by the FA, the next month he helped England record a 4–0 victory over Italy in Turin. Folklore said that he beat Alberto Eliani only to have the audacity to then pull a comb from his shorts pocket and comb his hair; the reality was that he used his hand to wipe his sweating brow in the beating Italian sun. However, the legend would follow him around the world in later life, and spectators in the crowd were convinced that they had witnessed it. Later in the year, he played in a goalless draw with Denmark, a 6–2 win over Northern Ireland, a 1–0 win over Wales, and a 6–0 triumph over Switzerland.

Manager Walter Winterbottom began to look for a more defensive winger, and so used Matthews just once in 1949 – a 3–1 defeat to Scotland in the British Home Championship. Only after impressing in an FA tour of Canada was he named as a last-minute inclusion in the England squad for the 1950 FIFA World Cup in Brazil. He did not play in the win over Chile or in the infamous defeat to the United States, but played just once, in the 1–0 defeat to Spain at the Maracanã Stadium. The preparation was not ideal as the FA did not take the competition seriously, and the hotel had "unpalatable" food and no training facilities.

After playing only in two further games, a 4–4 draw with a Europe XI and a 3–1 win over Northern Ireland, he found himself back on the international scene following his heroics in the 1953 FA Cup final. He was selected to play Hungary's Golden Team on 25 November 1953, in a 6–3 defeat that became known as the "Match of the Century". He blamed the FA and the selectors for the heavy loss, though he had great admiration for the Hungarians, particularly Ferenc Puskás.

He did not play in England's 7–1 defeat to Hungary in Budapest in May 1954. However, he was in the squad for the 1954 FIFA World Cup in Switzerland. Matthews helped England to a 4–4 draw with Belgium, though was left out of a win over Switzerland before he returned to the first XI as England crashed out of the competition with a 4–2 defeat to Uruguay at the St. Jakob Stadium after mistakes from goalkeeper Gil Merrick. His third match of the year was a 2–0 win over Northern Ireland at Windsor Park in the 1954–55 British Home Championship, though on the pitch he did not gel well with Don Revie. Matthews then put in a superb performance in a 2–0 win over the Welsh before he helped England to record a 3–1 victory over World Champions West Germany, though only three of the Germans used at Wembley had been in the first XI in the World Cup final.

England beat Scotland 7–2 in April 1955, and this time, Matthews linked up much better with Revie and 40-year-old Matthews was largely credited for the outstanding margin of victory. In this game, Duncan Edwards was making his England debut; when Matthews made his, Edwards had not even been born. Matthews went on England's unsuccessful tour of the continent in 1955, as the selectors erratic choices helped to ensure a 1–0 defeat to France, a 1–1 draw with Spain, and a 3–1 defeat to Portugal. Left out against Denmark, he was back in the team in October for a 1–1 draw with Wales.

Having been awarded the inaugural Ballon d'Or in 1956, that May he was recalled to the England front line for an encounter against Brazil in a crowded Wembley in what was the first friendly match played by both teams. England won the match 4–2, though the Brazilians would later become world champions in 1958. He then refused to take part in that summer's European tour, having already committed himself to his second summer of coaching in South Africa. In his next international game, against Northern Ireland on 6 October 1956, aged 41 years and 248 days, he became the oldest England player ever to score an international goal.

He played three of England's four qualification games for the 1958 FIFA World Cup: a 5–1 victory over the Republic of Ireland, and the 5–2 and 4–1 wins over Denmark. On 15 May 1957, Matthews became the oldest player ever to represent England, when at 42 years and 104 days old he turned out for the victory over the Danes in Copenhagen. Despite calls by the press for him to be included in the 1958 World Cup squad, this time the selectors did not bow to the pressure. Yet after 23 years, nobody would ever enjoy a longer career with the England team.

He was the subject of This Is Your Life in 1956 when he was surprised by Eamonn Andrews at the BBC Television Theatre.

He was one of many signatories in a letter to The Times on 17 July 1958 opposing "the policy of apartheid" in international sport and defending "the principle of racial equality which is embodied in the Declaration of the Olympic Games".

== Style of play ==
Franz Beckenbauer said that the speed and skill Matthews possessed meant that "almost no one in the game could stop him". John Charles noted that "he was the best crosser I've ever seen – and he had to contend with the old heavy ball". Johnny Giles said that "he had everything – good close control, great dribbling ability. He was lightning quick. He was also an intelligent player, who knew how to pass the ball". Despite his great talents, he rarely tackled opponents and was not adept at heading the ball or using his left foot.

An outside right, before 1937–38 he had scored 43 goals in four seasons, and full-backs began to mark him more tightly; because of this, he decided to drop deeper to collect the ball and aim to play pinpoint crosses as opposed to going for glory himself. Though he would never again score more than six goals in a season, this made him a more effective team player and a greater threat to the opposition.

His daughter Jean Gough told how Matthews would wear lead in his shoes walking to the ground so that "when he put his football boots on, they felt like ballerina shoes." Having trained to a level of fitness few other players would reach, by the mid-1950s he was able to cut back on his intense training as his level of fitness was by then ingrained in his body. He never smoked (despite promoting cigarette brands for advertising money); instead, he was very conscious of every item of food and drink he consumed, and he maintained a rigid daily training regime from childhood up until his old age. In an interview with the FA he said, "I had some very good advice and started to eat more salads and fruit, and every Monday I had no food. Just one day, on a Monday, but I felt better." The only time he knowingly consumed alcohol was when drinking champagne out of the FA Cup in 1953.

In addition to his attention to detail in diet and fitness, he also afforded scrutiny to his kit. 1950–51 he struck a boot sponsorship deal with the Co-op, though he instead began wearing a more lightweight pair of boots he had discovered on show at the World Cup – at the time they were not available to buy in England. He would wear the customised boots until his retirement, though they were so delicate that he got through countless pairs every season.

An avid student of the game, in the 1950 FIFA World Cup Matthews stayed on to watch teams such as Brazil and Uruguay compete in the tournament after England's elimination; the English FA, manager and media all returned home to, as Matthews said, "bury their heads in the sand." Matthews regularly condemned the "blazer brigade" at the FA in his autobiography, slating them as "conservative" and stressing that many of them were Old Etonians; in his view they treated players and supporters poorly, demonstrated arrogance by ignoring competitions they did not control (such as the World Cup and European domestic competitions), and viewed innovations with excessive suspicion (for example the FA sanctioned only the use of floodlights in 1952 despite artificial lighting having been experimented with as far back as 1878, and for years insisted on using outdated kit such as heavy "reinforced" boots). Writing about the FA allocating only 12,000 of the 100,000 available tickets for the 1953 FA Cup final to Blackpool supporters, Matthews wrote: "I couldn't make my mind up whether they were dunderheads or simply didn't care about the genuine supporters who were the lifeblood of the game".

He was never booked or sent off throughout his entire career, and teammate Jimmy Armfield noted that Matthews would never retaliate to the many extremely physical challenges opponents would often make to try and take him out of the game. Indeed, he ran the full gauntlet of emotions that all footballers run, but always retained a level head on the pitch, never losing his temper or allowing his emotions to affect his game.

== Coaching and management career ==
Matthews was appointed general manager at Stoke's rivals Port Vale in July 1965, alongside good friend Jackie Mudie; Matthews was unpaid, though was given expenses. The pair had a plan of bringing through talented schoolboys and selling one or two off every so often to improve the club's bleak financial picture whilst at the same time advancing through the leagues; in his autobiography he said that what Dario Gradi later achieved at Crewe Alexandra is what he had in mind for the Vale. Matthews concentrated his search in North East England and Central Scotland, where he discovered talented striker Mick Cullerton, though overlooked a teenage Ray Kennedy.

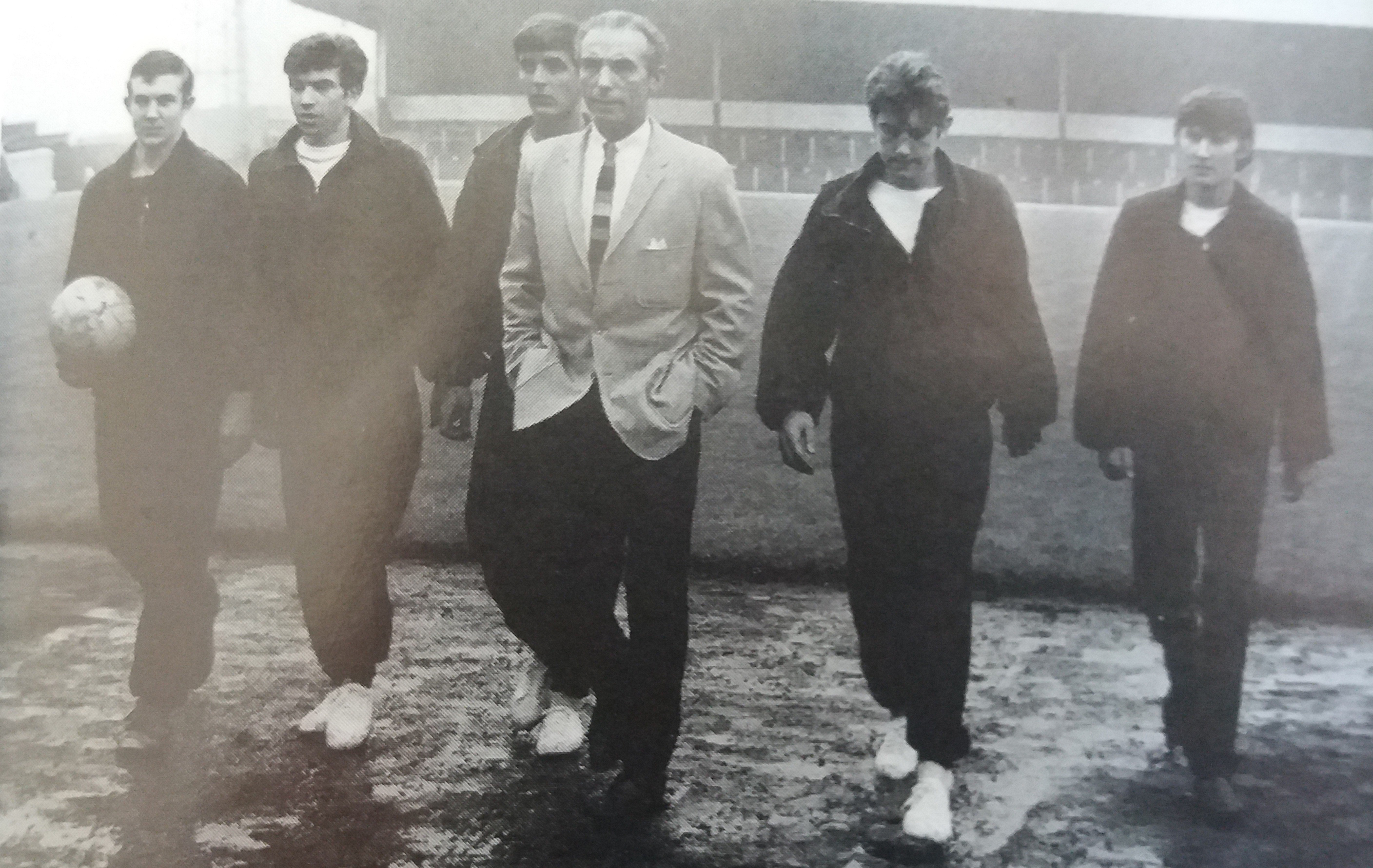
Matthews as Port Vale manager with youth players

Following Mudie's resignation in May 1967, he was handed complete managerial control, but Matthews could not guide the club to success. Instead, Port Vale were fined £4,000 in February/March 1968 and expelled from the Football League for financial irregularities. He was forced to use his name to plead with the other Football League clubs to re-elect the Vale, which they duly did. He stood down as manager in May 1968 and, despite being owed £9,000 in salary and expenses, agreed to stay at Vale Park to continue his work with the youth team. A "final settlement" was reached in December 1970, and Matthews was given £3,300, with the other £7,000 he was owed to be written off. Player Roy Sproson later said that "he [Matthews] trusted people who should never have been trusted and people took advantage of him. I am convinced a lot of people sponged off him and, all the while, the club were sliding." The experience "left a sour taste" in his mouth, and was enough to convince him never to try his hand as management in English football again.

Matthews gave up his summers every year between 1953 and 1978 to coach poor children in South Africa, Nigeria, Ghana, Uganda and Tanzania. In South Africa in 1975, he ignored apartheid to form a team of black schoolboys in Soweto called "Stan's Men". The members of his team told him that it was their dream to play in Brazil, so Matthews organised a trip there; they were the first black team ever to tour outside of South Africa. He did not have the money to fund the trip himself, though used his connections (for the only time other than when he used them to save Port Vale in 1968) to arrange sponsorship from Coca-Cola and the Johannesburg Sunday Times newspaper. The South African authorities did not want to cause an international incident, so did not prevent Stan's Men from getting on the plane to Rio de Janeiro, where they would meet legendary player Zico. On the way back from the trip, the Stan's Men captain Gilbert Moiloa called Matthews "black man with the white face". In a 2017 documentary film on his life, Matthews, the film crew travelled to Soweto to interview Stan's Men about their memories with Matthews.

He played his final game of football for an England Veterans XI against a Brazil Veterans XI in Brazil in 1985 at the age of 70; the English lost 6–1 to a team that included Amarildo, Tostão and Jairzinho. He damaged his cartilage during the match: "a promising career cut tragically short", he wrote in his autobiography.

== Retirement and death ==
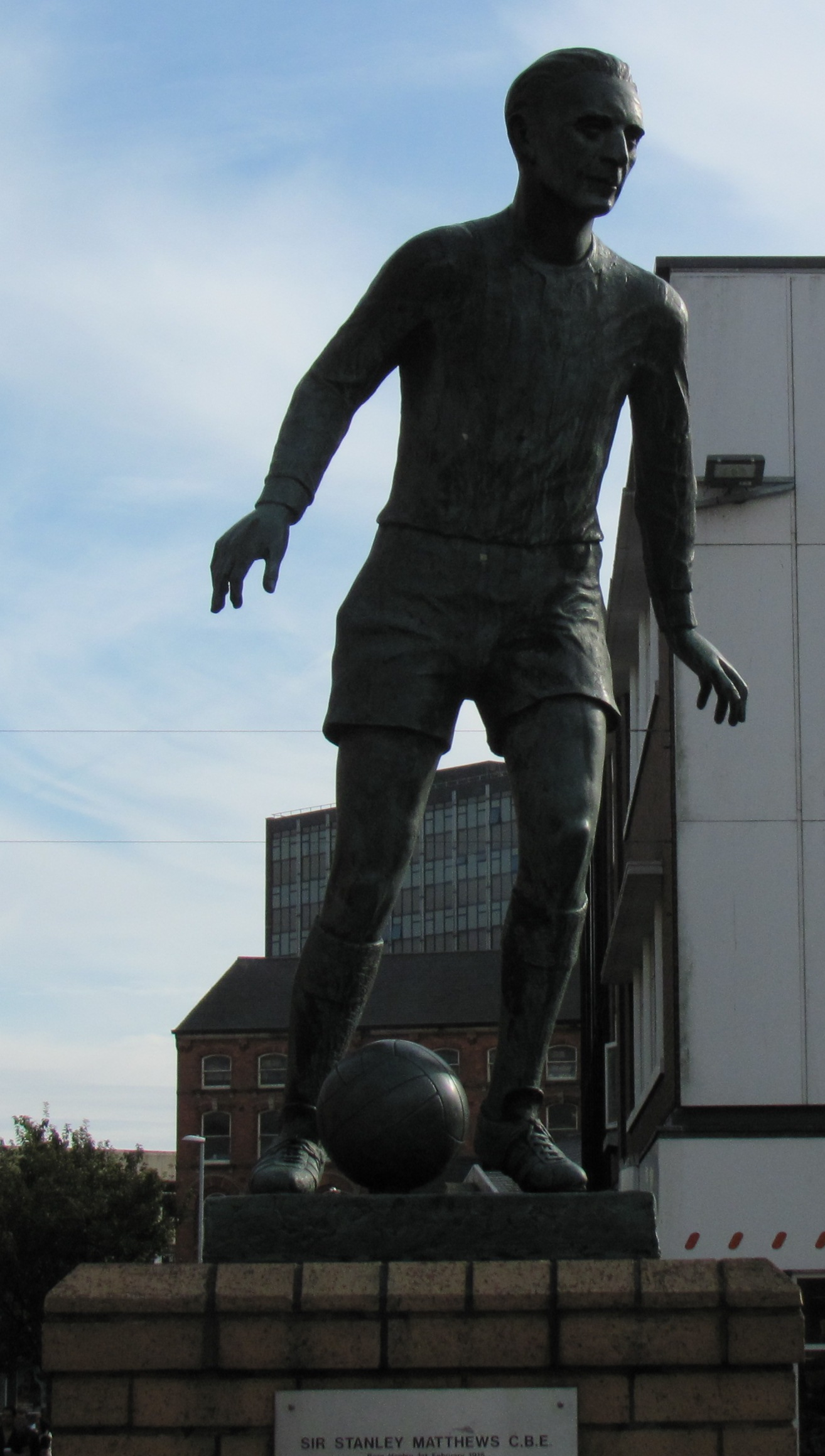
The statue of Matthews at Hanley town centre

Having toured the world coaching in Australia, the United States, Canada and especially in Africa, Matthews returned to Stoke-on-Trent with wife Mila in 1989. The couple moved to The Views in Penkhull, a listed building which was the birth_place of Oliver Lodge. He later served as president of Stoke City and honorary vice-president of Blackpool

Matthews remained physically fit into his seventies and eighties. He undertook early-morning runs, had never smoked and was a vegetarian for years, fasting for one day a week. He suffered a heart attack in May 1997. He died in North Staffordshire Nuffield Hospital in Newcastle-under-Lyme on 23 February 2000, aged 85, after suffering a fall at his holiday home in Tenerife. Mila had died the previous year.

His death was announced on the radio just before starting an England v Argentina friendly match. He was cremated following a funeral service in Stoke on 3 March 2000. His funeral was attended by many of his fellow footballers, such as Bobby Charlton and Jack Charlton, Gordon Banks, Nat Lofthouse and Tom Finney. His ashes were buried beneath the centre circle of Stoke City's Stadium, which he had officially opened in August 1997. After his death, more than 100,000 people lined the streets of Stoke-on-Trent to pay tribute.

After his death, dozens of footballing legends paid tribute to him, and his autobiography's epilogue contains several quotations. Pelé said he was "the man who taught us the way football should be played", and Brian Clough added that "he was a true gentleman and we shall never see his like again". Former England goalkeeper Gordon Banks said: "I don't think anyone since had a name so synonymous with football in England", whilst World Cup winning German defender Berti Vogts commented that "It is not just in England where his name is famous. All over the world he is regarded as a true football genius".

=== Legacy ===
Stanley Matthews was inducted into the Ontario Sports Hall of Fame in 1995. Matthews was made an inaugural inductee of the English Football Hall of Fame in 2002 in recognition of his talents. The International Federation of Football History & Statistics voted him the 11th greatest footballer of the 20th century. Matthews was placed 17th in World Soccer magazine's "100 Greatest Players of the 20th Century" list, published in 1999.

He was inducted into the Blackpool F.C. Hall of Fame at Bloomfield Road when it was officially opened by Jimmy Armfield in April 2006. Organised by the Blackpool Supporters Association, Blackpool fans around the world voted on their all-time heroes. Five players from each decade are inducted; Matthews is in the 1950s. The West Stand at Blackpool's Bloomfield Road is named in his honour. He was also inducted into the Stoke-on-Trent Hall of Fame when it was opened in January 2011. There is a statue of Matthews outside Stoke City's Britannia Stadium and another in the centre of Hanley. The dedication on the former reads: "His name is symbolic of the beauty of the game, his fame timeless and international, his sportsmanship and modesty universally acclaimed. A magical player, of the people, for the people."

The Stanley Matthews Collection is held by the National Football Museum. In February 2010, the boots worn by Matthews in the 1953 FA Cup final were auctioned at Bonhams in Chester for £38,400 to an undisclosed buyer. Sierra Leonean football club Mighty Blackpool F.C., based in the capital city of Freetown, changed their name from Socro United in 1954 because of their admiration for Matthews. Ormiston Sir Stanley Matthews Academy is a secondary school in Blurton, Stoke-on-Trent, named after him.

In 2017 a documentary film was made about Matthews' life entitled Matthews with son Stanley Jr. as Executive Producer.

In November 1985 a British Rail Mark 3 carriage was named Sir Stanley Matthews by British Rail.

== Personal life ==
On 19 August 1935 in Eaglesham, Scotland, Matthews married Betty Vallance, daughter of Stoke City trainer Jimmy, whom he first met on his 15th birthday in 1930 on his first day as office boy at the Victoria Ground. The couple had two children together, including Stanley Jr.

In 1967, while on a tour of Czechoslovakia with Port Vale, Matthews met 44-year-old Mila, the group's interpreter. Matthews was still married to Betty, but as he was convinced he had found the true love of his life in Mila, he and Betty divorced. He and Mila spent the ensuing years living at various times in Marsaxlokk in Malta, South Africa and Burlington, Ontario, Canada. They also travelled extensively as Matthews's coaching jobs and guest appearances dictated. After Mila died on 5 May 1999 at the age of 76, according to Les Scott (who helped Matthews write his autobiography), Matthews "was never the same person".

"Self-willed, strong-minded, humorous, generous of spirit and, for all his fame, as down to earth as the folk who once adorned the terraces in the hope of seeing him sparkle gold dust onto their harsh working lives."

— Les Scott describing Matthews' personality in the epilogue to his autobiography.

== Career statistics ==
=== Club ===
Appearances and goals by club, season and competition
Club	Season	League			FA Cup		Total	
Club	Season	Division	Apps	Goals	Apps	Goals	Apps	Goals
Stoke City	1931–32	Second Division	2	0	0	0	2	0
Stoke City	1932–33	Second Division	15	1	0	0	15	1
Stoke City	1933–34	First Division	29	11	4	4	33	15
Stoke City	1934–35	First Division	36	10	1	1	37	11
Stoke City	1935–36	First Division	40	10	5	0	45	10
Stoke City	1936–37	First Division	40	7	2	0	42	7
Stoke City	1937–38	First Division	38	6	3	0	41	6
Stoke City	1938–39	First Division	36	2	2	0	38	2
Stoke City	1939–40	First Division	3 (Note: These three matches were played before competitive football was suspended due to the outbreak of the Second World War and are not included in the total)	0	—		3	0
Stoke City	1945–46	Football League North	—		8	0	8	0
Stoke City	1946–47	First Division	23	4	5	1	28	5
Stoke City	Total		259	51	30	6	289	57
Blackpool	1947–48	First Division	33	1	6	0	39	1
Blackpool	1948–49	First Division	25	3	3	0	28	3
Blackpool	1949–50	First Division	31	0	3	0	34	0
Blackpool	1950–51	First Division	36	0	8	0	44	0
Blackpool	1951–52	First Division	18	1	1	0	19	1
Blackpool	1952–53	First Division	20	4	7	1	27	5
Blackpool	1953–54	First Division	30	2	7	0	37	2
Blackpool	1954–55	First Division	34	1	1	0	35	1
Blackpool	1955–56	First Division	36	3	1	0	37	3
Blackpool	1956–57	First Division	25	2	4	0	29	2
Blackpool	1957–58	First Division	28	0	1	0	29	0
Blackpool	1958–59	First Division	19	0	6	0	25	0
Blackpool	1959–60	First Division	15	0	0	0	15	0
Blackpool	1960–61	First Division	27	0	1	0	28	0
Blackpool	1961–62	First Division	2	0	—		2	0
Blackpool	Total		379	17	49	1	428	18
Stoke City	1961–62	Second Division	18	2	3	1	21	3
Stoke City	1962–63	Second Division	31	1	0	0	31	1
Stoke City	1963–64	First Division	9	0	4	1	13	1
Stoke City	1964–65	First Division	1	0	0	0	1	0
Stoke City	Total		59	3	7	2	66	5
Toronto City (loan)	1961	Eastern Canada; Professional Soccer League	14	0	—		14	0
Toronto City (loan)	1965	Eastern Canada; Professional Soccer League	6	0	—		6	0
Toronto City (loan)	Total		20	0	0	0	20	0
Career total			717	71	86	9	803	80

=== International ===
Appearances and goals by national team and year
National team	Year	Apps	Goals
England	1934	2	1
England	1935	1	0
England	1936	0	0
England	1937	3	4
England	1938	8	3
England	1939	3	0
England	1940	0	0
England	1941	0	0
England	1942	0	0
England	1943	0	0
England	1944	0	0
England	1945	0	0
England	1946	0	0
England	1947	6	1
England	1948	6	1
England	1949	1	0
England	1950	2	0
England	1951	1	0
England	1952	0	0
England	1953	3	0
England	1954	5	0
England	1955	5	0
England	1956	5	1
England	1957	3	0
Total		54	11

Scores and results list England's goal tally first, score column indicates score after each Matthews goal.

List of international goals scored by Stanley Matthews
No.	Date	Venue	Opponent	Score	Result	Competition
1	29 September 1934	Ninian Park, Cardiff, Wales	Wales		4–0	1934–35 British Home Championship
2	17 November 1937	Ayresome Park, Middlesbrough, England	Wales		2–1	1937–38 British Home Championship
3	1 December 1937	White Hart Lane, London, England	Czechoslovakia		5–4	Friendly
4	1 December 1937	White Hart Lane, London, England	Czechoslovakia		5–4	Friendly
5	1 December 1937	White Hart Lane, London, England	Czechoslovakia		5–4	Friendly
6	14 May 1938	Olympiastadion, Berlin, Germany	Germany		6–3	Friendly
7	22 October 1938	Ninian Park, Cardiff, Wales	Wales		2–4	1938–39 British Home Championship
8	18 November 1938	Old Trafford, Manchester, England	Ireland		7–0	1938–39 British Home Championship
9	25 May 1947	Estádio Nacional, Lisbon, Portugal	Portugal		10–0	Friendly
10	9 October 1948	Windsor Park, Belfast, Northern Ireland	Ireland		6–2	1948–49 British Home Championship
11	6 October 1956	Windsor Park, Belfast, Northern Ireland	Northern Ireland		1–1	1956–57 British Home Championship

=== Managerial statistics ===
Managerial record by team and tenure
Team	From	To	Record				
Team	From	To	P	W	D	L	Win %
Port Vale	31 May 1967	31 May 1968	49	13	15	21	26.5
Total			49	13	15	21	26.5

== Honours ==
=== Player ===
Stoke City

- Football League Second Division: 1932–33, 1962–63
- Staffordshire Senior Cup: 1933–34

Rangers

- Glasgow Charity Cup: 1940–41

Blackpool

- FA Cup: 1952–53; runner-up: 1947–48, 1950–51
- Football League War Cup: 1942–43

England

- British Home Championship: 1935^{[a]}, 1938, 1939^{[a]}, 1947, 1948, 1954, 1955, 1956^{[a]}, 1957

a. The Championship was shared with Scotland in 1935, with Wales and Scotland in 1939, and with Scotland, Wales and Northern Ireland in 1956.

=== Manager ===
Hibernians

- Maltese FA Trophy: 1970–71
- Independence Cup: 1970–71
- Sons of Malta Cup: 1970–71

=== Individual ===
- FWA Footballer of the Year: 1948, 1963
- Ballon d'Or: 1956
- Pierre de Coubertin World Trophy: 1986
- PFA Merit Award: 1987
- FIFA Gold Order of Merit: 1992
- FWA Tribute Award: 1995
- Ontario Sports Hall of Fame: 1995 (Honorary member)
- Football League 100 Legends: 1998
- English Football Hall of Fame: 2002
- PFA Team of the Century (1907–1976): 2007
- IFFHS Legends
- IFFHS men's All Time England dream team
- IFFHS England Player of the Century: #2
- IFFHS European Player of the Century: #8
- IFFHS World Player of the Century: #11

=== Orders ===
- Order of the British Empire: 1957
- Knight Bachelor: 1965

== Autobiography ==
Matthews' autobiography, The Way It Was, was released by Headline in 2000. The book is dedicated to his wife Mila, who died the year before its publication. Matthews, then 84, collaborated with Les Scott, his friend of 10 years, in the writing of the book over an 18-month period on an almost daily basis. "Stan, as he had been all his life, was an early riser", wrote Scott in the epilogue. "Our collaborations were over by eleven in the morning and, without fail, took place in his den. He loved working on his book and, after I had left him, he would give the morning's session more applied thought — more often than not ringing me at home to provide additional thoughts or anecdotes."

Matthews had previously written another autobiography. Titled Feet First, it was published by Ewen And Dale in 1948.
