= Armfield Academy =

Location
- 488 Lytham Road, Blackpool, Lancashire, FY4 1TL; Blackpool, Lancashire; 53°47′22″N 3°02′52″W

Information
- School type: Free school
- Established: September 1, 2018
- Local authority: Blackpool
- Department for Education URN: 145863 Tables
- Ofsted: Reports
- Head teacher: Mr Mark Kilmurray
- Age range: 3-16
- Website: https://www.armfieldacademy.co.uk/

Armfield Academy is an all-through school in Blackpool, Lancashire. It is part of the Fylde Coast Academy Trust.

== History ==
After Arnold School merged with King Edward VII and Queen Mary School and moved to Lytham in 2013, its old building was left vacant. In 2016, the land was acquired by the Fylde Coast Academy Trust, who announced their intention to open a new all-through school. At first the plan was to name it Avenue School, but following a campaign by former Blackpool mayor Robert Wynne, it was named after footballer Jimmy Armfield, who attended Arnold.

== Ofsted ==
The school has been inspected once since opening, on 7^{th} February 2023, and was rated Good in all areas. Inspectors praised the school culture, behaviour management and careers advice, but noted "some variability in how the ambitious curriculum is delivered". It was also noted that in some cases disadvantaged pupils had low school attendance and assessment data was not always used as effectively as it could be.
