= Matthews (film) =

2017 film

- Official poster
- Directed by: Ryan Scott Warren
- Written by: J. David Everhart
- Produced by: Joe Pierce; Mitch Horn; Ryan Scott Warren
- Edited by: Alexander Gabrielli; Ben Westlake; Joshua King Ortiz
- Music by: Bill Conn
- Production company: Imagination Factory Studios
- Release date: October 18, 2017
- Running time: 78 minutes
- Country: United States
- Language: English

Matthews is a 2017 documentary film directed by Ryan Scott Warren, produced by Joe Pierce, and written by J. David Everhart. It is about the life and legacy of British footballer Sir Stanley Matthews.

== Synopsis ==
Matthews tells the true story of the life and career of Sir Stanley Matthews considered by many to be the greatest footballer of all time. It documents his early years to his football career playing for Stoke City, Blackpool, and England, playing in the 1950 FIFA World Cup and 1954 FIFA World Cup, to his retired years as a coach for an all-black team in Soweto known as "Stan's Men". The film includes interviews from Sir Richard Branson, Sir Michael Parkinson, Gary Lineker, and Stanley Matthews's son Stanley Jr.

== Release ==
The premiere of Matthews was held at the Stoke Film Theatre in Stoke-on-Trent on 18 October 2017 and it was released digitally on 23 October 2017.

== Reception ==
Colin Lomas of Vulture Hound calls Matthews "an excellent portrait of a very humble man" and UK magazine Radio Times has given the film a 3/5 star review.
