= Ray Charnley =

English footballer (1935–2009)

Personal information
- Full name: Raymond Ogden Charnley
- Date of birth: 29 May 1935
- Place of birth: Lancaster, England
- Date of death: 15 November 2009 (aged 74)
- Place of death: Rossall, England
- Position: Centre forward

Senior career*
Years	Team	Apps	(Gls)
1954–1957	Morecambe	?	(?)
1957–1967	Blackpool	363	(193)
1967–1968	Preston North End	23	(4)
1968–1969	Wrexham	20	(5)
1969–1970	Bradford Park Avenue	59	(15)
1970–1972	Morecambe	?	(?)
Total		605	(293)

International career
1962	England	1	(0)
- * Club domestic league appearances and goals

Raymond Ogden Charnley (29 May 1935 – 15 November 2009) was an English professional footballer. He was a centre forward and was one of the most prolific scorers for Blackpool, with whom he spent ten years, including all but one season in the top flight of English football.

With 193 goals in 363 league games, Charnley is the third-highest scorer in Blackpool's history, behind Jimmy Hampson and Stan Mortensen.

In a playing career spanning eighteen years, Charnley also played for Morecambe (with whom he began and ended his career), Preston North End, Wrexham and Bradford Park Avenue. He scored a total of 293 career league goals in 605 games.

He won one England cap, in 1962.

There have been Blackpool footballers who have played more games for the club than Ray Charnley; and there have been men who have contributed more league goals to the Bloomfield Road cause than the tall, rangy Lancastrian centre-forward. But on both counts, from faithful fans of the Seasiders whose memories stretch back half a century and beyond, there would have to come the heartfelt and grateful rider: not many

— From Ray Charnley's obituary in The Independent

== Club career ==
=== Early career ===
Born in Lancaster, Lancashire, Charnley started out as a teenager in the Preston North End B team. When the team was disbanded, he joined North Lancashire and District Football League side Bolton-le-Sands. He later signed as a part-time professional with non-League Morecambe, in the Lancashire Combination, joining them from Bolton-le-Sands for £15 in September 1954, whilst also working as a painter and decorator apprentice.

He made his Morecambe debut on 29 September, in a 5–2 defeat at Lancaster City in the Lancashire Combination Cup. In his three seasons at Christie Park he was a regular scorer. In the 1956–57 season he scored 31 goals in 37 league games and 12 goals in 15 cup games.

=== Blackpool ===
On 27 May 1957, Charnley moved to nearby Blackpool, who were then in the First Division, the top flight of English football, for £750. He was bought by then-manager Joe Smith. After being injured in pre-season training, the 22-year-old first played three reserve-team games before making his first-team debut in September, a 2–0 defeat at Luton Town. A month later, he scored two goals in Blackpool's record home victory, 7–0 against Sunderland, before being forced to leave the game with a severely gashed head. He ended the 1957–58 season as the club's third-highest scorer, with 12 goals in 20 games, behind Jackie Mudie and Bill Perry, who both netted 18. At the end of the season he was voted as the club's "most promising player".

Charnley eventually teamed up with Jackie Mudie, a move inspired by Joe Smith and later used to good effect by his successor as Blackpool manager, Ron Suart. Charnley was the Seasiders' top scorer for nine seasons., including five consecutive seasons starting in 1958–59, when he scored a total of 26 goals (20 in 35 league games and six in six games in the FA Cup). He had started that season by scoring three goals in the first two games. Then, after scoring against Aston Villa in a 1–1 draw on 20 September 1958, he collided with Villa goalkeeper Nigel Sims and suffered a broken clavicle, which caused him to miss the next seven games. On 4 April 1959, he scored his first league hat-trick, in a 3–0 win over Leeds United.

He again scored three goals in his first two games in 1959–60; however, he then went five games without scoring and was relegated to the reserve team. After eight games in the second string, he returned to the first team, scoring a hat-trick in a 4–2 win over Leeds United on 5 March 1960. He finished the season on 18 goals. In 1960–61, Blackpool struggled against relegation. On 15 April 1961, he scored the winning goal in a 2–1 victory over Newcastle United at Bloomfield Road, a result that secured safety for Blackpool. He finished the season on 27 goals.

He was my room-mate for 10 years and one of my closest friends. The money Blackpool paid to Morecambe must go down as their best-ever signing – apart from Stanley Matthews, of course. Jack Charlton once told me that he hated playing against Ray.

— Former teammate at Blackpool, Jimmy Armfield on Charnley

His most goals came in 1961–62: 36 goals (30 in the league and six in the League Cup). He had started the season with eight goals in eight games. On 20 January 1962 he scored four goals in a 7–2 victory over Wolverhampton Wanderers. Then on 3 February, against Nottingham Forest he scored his 100th league goal in only his 156th game – a record only marginally beaten by Harry Bedford – playing his best football alongside Alan Ball.

He scored Blackpool's opening goal of the 1962–63 season, in a 2–1 victory over Liverpool at Anfield. He scored two hat-tricks that season – firstly, in a 4–0 win over Aston Villa on 29 March 1963, and then in a 6–3 victory over Birmingham City on 20 April. The following season was the first time he did not score in his first game, but he then scored one in each of the next two games. After a run of eight goals in 24 games, he was left out of the side. In March 1964, he was placed on the transfer list, before being removed when no other club came in for him. Alan Ball finished the season as the leading scorer in the league, with 13 goals to Charnley's ten. However, Charnley was overall top scorer as he also scored five in cup games. The 1964–65 season saw Charnley score eight goals in the opening nine games. This occurred while he was on a month-to-month contract because he could not agree the new terms that the club had offered. On 1 October 1964, he signed a new deal, earning £24 a week, with an extra £5 when he played in the first team. That season, he only missed four games through injury and finished with 21 goals.

In May and June 1965, Charnley was a member of the Blackpool squad that played in New Zealand for the B.O.A.C. Trophy against Sheffield United. A total of eleven games were played, and Charnley was Blackpool's top scorer, with five goals.

Charnley, once again, began the 1965–66 season by scoring in the opening game, a 2–2 draw with Fulham. He missed just one game all season and lead, jointly with Alan Ball, the scoring in the league, with 16 goals, although he was again overall top scorer with another three cup goals. The 1966–67 saw Blackpool finish bottom of the First Division and relegated to the Second Division, although Charnley was again top scorer on 14 goals. He also scored six goals in the League Cup as Blackpool reached the fifth round, including a hat-trick in a second-round 5–1 win over Manchester United.

He started the 1967–68 season, with Blackpool then in the Second Division, in typical fashion: scoring in his first game, a 2–0 victory over arch-rivals Preston North End; however, after two more league games, and after a home defeat at the hands of Millwall, 'Pool manager Stan Mortensen made the unpopular decision and dropped Charnley into the reserve team, with Gerry Ingram being moved to centre forward. After eight goals in nine reserve games, Charnley made one more first-team appearance, scoring in a 2–0 win over Crystal Palace. On 7 December, after a total of 222 goals in 407 games in all competitions, the forward was on his way out of Bloomfield Road, to Preston North End for a transfer fee of £12,500.

=== Move to Preston North End, then Wrexham and Bradford Park Avenue ===
After signing for Preston North End, Charnley returned to face Blackpool nine days later, and scored, though the Tangerines won 4–1. He scored four goals in 23 league games for Preston, who just avoided relegation at the end of the 1967–68 season, finishing third-bottom, while former club Blackpool just missed out on promotion back to the First Division on goal average.

In 1968, Charnley signed for Fourth Division side Wrexham, scoring a total of seven goals in 24 games in all competitions before moving to Bradford Park Avenue in January 1969.

They finished bottom of the Fourth Division in the 1968–69 season. The following season they again finished bottom, but this time lost their application for re-election and were voted out of the Football League and dropped into the Northern Premier League. He scored fifteen goals in 59 league games for the Avenue that season.

=== Return to Morecambe ===
At the end of the season, Charnley re-signed for former club Morecambe, who were by then playing in the Northern Premier League. He made 24 league starts in 1970–71, finishing the season as top scorer with 13 goals. After 14 games in the 1971–72 season, he was released. His last game came on Good Friday 1972, when he scored in a 3–0 home win over Chorley. In his two stints with Morecambe, Charnley scored a total of 98 goals in 177 appearances in all competitions. After his release, Charnley retired from football, at the age of 37.

== International career ==
Despite his goalscoring record, Charnley won just one England cap, in 1962, when he received a call-up for a 1964 European Nations' Cup Preliminary round game against France on 3 October at Hillsborough. When asked in later years if he felt bitter about not being picked more for England, Charnley said: "No, I thought I might have been given another chance. But I was not surprised when I was dropped. I just could not get into the match. I think four of the five forwards were making their first, and last, appearances."

== English FA World Tour ==
In May and June 1961, Charnley was a member of the squad for The English FA World Tour. He played in seven games, scoring a total of eleven goals.

Date	Venue	Opponent	Result	goals
13 May 1961	Merdeka Stadium, Kuala Lumpur	Malaysia	4–2	3
17 May 1961	Jalan Besar Stadium, Singapore	Singapore	9–0	2
21 May 1961	Government Stadium, Hong Kong	Hong Kong	4–2	2
23 May 1961	Government Stadium, Hong Kong	Combined Chinese XI	3–0	1
3 June 1961	English Park, Canterbury, New Zealand	Canterbury	11–1	1
10 June 1961	Epsom Showgrounds, Epsom	New Zealand	6–1	1
19 June 1961	San Francisco, United States	San Francisco	2–1	1

== Blackpool F.C. Hall of Fame ==
Charnley was inducted into the Hall of Fame at Bloomfield Road, when it was officially opened by former Blackpool player Jimmy Armfield in April 2006. Organised by the Blackpool Supporters Association, Blackpool fans around the world voted on their all-time heroes. Five players from each decade are inducted; Charnley is in the 1960s.

== Personal life ==
After he retired, Charnley moved back to Blackpool, where he set up his own painting and decorating company. He had married his wife Edna in 1958. They had one son, Wayne.

After a short illness, Charnley died on 15 November 2009 at Rossall Hospital, aged 74. His funeral took place on 24 November at Holy Trinity Church, South Shore, Blackpool. Jimmy Armfield told the packed church: "As you get older you learn to face upset, but I still have problems saying goodbye to friends, especially one of 52 years. He hadn't been well for a while, nevertheless losing him is hard to take. Somehow, this planet we share is less attractive when people like Ray Charnley leave." His son, Wayne, paid tribute to his father, saying he was proud of the tributes which had remembered his father as a gentleman, as that was what he was, adding, "Not many people can drop into a conversation that their dad played for England. I could, and I was very proud to do so."

There was a minute's applause before the first West Lancashire derby of the 2009–10 season between Blackpool and Preston North End at Bloomfield Road on 30 November.

== Career statistics ==
=== Club statistics ===
Appearances and goals by club, season and competition
Club	Season	League			FA Cup		League Cup		Other		Total	
Club	Season	Division	Apps	Goals	Apps	Goals	Apps	Goals	Apps	Goals	Apps	Goals
Blackpool	1957–58	First Division	20	12	1	0	0	0	0	0	21	12
Blackpool	1958–59	First Division	35	20	6	6	0	0	0	0	41	26
Blackpool	1959–60	First Division	34	18	3	0	0	0	0	0	37	18
Blackpool	1960–61	First Division	41	27	1	1	0	0	0	0	42	28
Blackpool	1961–62	First Division	41	30	2	0	7	6	0	0	50	36
Blackpool	1962–63	First Division	41	22	2	0	3	0	0	0	46	22
Blackpool	1963–64	First Division	28	10	2	1	2	4	0	0	32	15
Blackpool	1964–65	First Division	38	21	1	0	2	1	0	0	41	22
Blackpool	1965–66	First Division	41	16	2	1	2	2	0	0	45	19
Blackpool	1966–67	First Division	40	14	1	1	5	6	0	0	46	21
Blackpool	1967–68	Second Division	4	3	0	0	2	0	0	0	6	3
Blackpool	Blackpool total		363	193	21	10	23	19	0	0	407	222
Preston North End	1967–68	Second Division	23	4	2	3	0	0	0	0	25	7
Wrexham	1968–69	Fourth Division	20	5	1	1	3	1	0	0	24	7
Bradford Park Avenue	1968–69	Fourth Division	19	3	0	0	0	0	0	0	19	3
Bradford Park Avenue	1969–70	Fourth Division	40	12	1	0	1	0	0	0	42	12
Bradford Park Avenue	Bradford Park Avenue total		59	15	1	0	1	0	0	0	61	15
Career total			465	217	25	14	27	19	0	0	517	250

=== International statistics ===
Appearances and goals by national team and year
National team	Year	Apps	Goals
England	1962	1	0
Total		1	0
