= 1958–59 Blackpool F.C. season =

English football club season

Blackpool F.C.
1958–59 season
- Manager: Ron Suart
- Division One: 8th
- FA Cup: Sixth round
- Top goalscorer: League: Ray Charnley (20); All: Ray Charnley (26)
Home colours

The 1958–59 season was Blackpool F.C.'s 51st season (48th consecutive) in the Football League. They competed in the 22-team Division One, then the top tier of English football, finishing eighth.

This was Ron Suart's first season as manager, after his succession of the long-serving Joe Smith.

Ray Charnley was the club's top scorer, with 26 goals (20 in the league and six in the FA Cup).

== Table ==
Pos	Team	Pld	W	D	L	GF	GA	GAv	Pts
6	West Ham United	42	21	6	15	85	70	1.214	48
7	Burnley	42	19	10	13	81	70	1.157	48
8	Blackpool	42	18	11	13	66	49	1.347	47
9	Birmingham City	42	20	6	16	84	68	1.235	46
10	Blackburn Rovers	42	17	10	15	76	70	1.086	44

Source: World Football
Rules for classification: 1) Points; 2) Goal average; 3) Goals scored
