= 1966–67 Blackpool F.C. season =

English football club season

Blackpool F.C.
1966–67 season
- Manager: Ron Suart (succeeded by Stan Mortensen on 1 February 1967)
- Division One: 22nd (relegated)
- FA Cup: Third round
- League Cup: Fifth round
- Top goalscorer: League: Ray Charnley (14); All: Ray Charnley (21)
Home colours

The 1966–67 season was Blackpool F.C.'s 59th season (56th consecutive) in the Football League. They competed in the 22-team Division One, then the top tier of English football, finishing bottom. As a result, they were relegated to Division Two.

After eight seasons in charge, Ron Suart resigned as manager in January. He was replaced by former player Stan Mortensen.

Ray Charnley was the club's top scorer for the ninth consecutive season, with 21 goals (fourteen in the league, one in the FA Cup and six in the League Cup).

== Table ==
Pos	Team	Pld	W	D	L	GF	GA	GAv	Pts	Qualification or relegation
18	Fulham	42	11	12	19	71	83	0.855	34	
19	Southampton	42	14	6	22	74	92	0.804	34	
20	Newcastle United	42	12	9	21	39	81	0.481	33	
21	Aston Villa (R)	42	11	7	24	54	85	0.635	29	Relegation to the Second Division
22	Blackpool (R)	42	6	9	27	41	76	0.539	21	Relegation to the Second Division

Source: World Football
Rules for classification: 1) Points; 2) Goal average; 3) Goals scored
(R) Relegated
