= 1959–60 Blackpool F.C. season =

English football club season

Blackpool F.C.
1959–60 season
- Manager: Ron Suart
- Division One: 11th
- FA Cup: Fourth round
- Top goalscorer: League: Ray Charnley (18); All: Ray Charnley (18)
Home colours

The 1959–60 season was Blackpool F.C.'s 52nd season (49th consecutive) in the Football League. They competed in the 22-team Division One, then the top tier of English football, finishing eleventh, mid-table.

Ray Charnley was the club's top scorer for the second consecutive season, with eighteen goals.

Hugh Kelly retired at the end of the season after seventeen years of service for Blackpool, his only professional club. George Farm left mid season to join Queen of the South after becoming the first player to make 500 first team appearances for Blackpool.

== Table ==
Pos	Team	Pld	W	D	L	GF	GA	GAv	Pts
9	Preston North End	42	16	12	14	79	76	1.039	44
10	Fulham	42	17	10	15	73	80	0.913	44
11	Blackpool	42	15	10	17	59	71	0.831	40
12	Leicester City	42	13	13	16	66	75	0.880	39
13	Arsenal	42	15	9	18	68	80	0.850	39

Source: World Football
Rules for classification: 1) Points; 2) Goal average; 3) Goals scored
