= 1960–61 Blackpool F.C. season =

English football club season

Blackpool F.C.
1960–61 season
- Manager: Ron Suart
- Division One: 20th
- FA Cup: Fourth round
- League Cup: Second round
- Top goalscorer: League: Ray Charnley (27); All: Ray Charnley (28)
Home colours

The 1960–61 season was Blackpool F.C.'s 53rd season (50th consecutive) in the Football League. They competed in the 22-team Division One, then the top tier of English football, finishing twentieth.

The League Cup competition was introduced this season, and Blackpool exited at the second-round stage (the round in which they entered) at the hands of Leeds United, after a replay.

Ray Charnley was the club's top scorer for the third consecutive season, with 28 goals (27 in the league and one in the FA Cup).

On 10 September 1960, Bloomfield Road became the venue for the first televised football game in England for the visit of Bolton Wanderers. The Trotters won by a single goal.

== Table ==
| Pos | Team | Pld | W | D | L | GF | GA | GAv | Pts | Qualification or relegation |
|---|---|---|---|---|---|---|---|---|---|---|
| 18 | Bolton Wanderers | 42 | 12 | 11 | 19 | 58 | 73 | 0.795 | 35 | |
| 19 | Birmingham City | 42 | 14 | 6 | 22 | 62 | 84 | 0.738 | 34 | Qualification for the Inter-Cities Fairs Cup second round |
| 20 | Blackpool | 42 | 12 | 9 | 21 | 68 | 73 | 0.932 | 33 | |
| 21 | Newcastle United (R) | 42 | 11 | 10 | 21 | 86 | 109 | 0.789 | 32 | Relegation to the Second Division |
| 22 | Preston North End (R) | 42 | 10 | 10 | 22 | 43 | 71 | 0.606 | 30 | Relegation to the Second Division |

Source: World Football
Rules for classification: 1) Points; 2) Goal average; 3) Goals scored
(R) Relegated
