= 1965–66 Blackpool F.C. season =

English football club season

Blackpool F.C.
1965–66 season
- Manager: Ron Suart
- Division One: 13th
- FA Cup: Third round
- League Cup: Third round
- Top goalscorer: League: Alan Ball & Ray Charnley (16); All: Ray Charnley (19)
Home colours

The 1965–66 season was Blackpool F.C.'s 58th season (55th consecutive) in the Football League. They competed in the 22-team Division One, then the top tier of English football, finishing thirteenth.

Ray Charnley was the club's top overall scorer for the eighth consecutive season, with 19 goals. Alan Ball (sixteen goals) shared the accolade with him in the league.

Christmas during the Middle Ages was a public festival with annual indulgences included the sporting. When Puritans outlawed Christmas in England in December 1647 the crowd brought out footballs as a symbol of festive misrule. The Orkney Christmas Day Ba' tradition continues. In the former top tear of English football, home and away Christmas Day and Boxing Day double headers were often played guaranteeing football clubs large crowds by allowing many working people their only chance to watch a game. Champions Preston North End faced Aston Villa on Christmas Day 1889 and the last Christmas Day fixture was in 1965 in England, Blackpool beating Blackburn Rovers 4–2.

== Table ==
| Pos | Team | Pld | W | D | L | GF | GA | GAv | Pts | Qualification or relegation |
|---|---|---|---|---|---|---|---|---|---|---|
| 11 | Everton | 42 | 15 | 11 | 16 | 56 | 62 | 0.903 | 41 | Qualification for the European Cup Winners' Cup first round (Note: Everton qualified for the European Cup Winners' Cup as the 1965–66 FA Cup winners.) |
| 12 | West Ham United | 42 | 15 | 9 | 18 | 70 | 83 | 0.843 | 39 | |
| 13 | Blackpool | 42 | 14 | 9 | 19 | 55 | 65 | 0.846 | 37 | |
| 14 | Arsenal | 42 | 12 | 13 | 17 | 62 | 75 | 0.827 | 37 | |
| 15 | Newcastle United | 42 | 14 | 9 | 19 | 50 | 63 | 0.794 | 37 | |

Source: World Football
Rules for classification: 1) Points; 2) Goal average; 3) Goals scored
