= 1964–65 Blackpool F.C. season =

English football club season

Blackpool F.C.
1964–65 season
- Manager: Ron Suart
- Division One: 17th
- FA Cup: Third round
- League Cup: Third round
- Top goalscorer: League: Ray Charnley (21); All: Ray Charnley (22)
Home colours

The 1964–65 season was Blackpool F.C.'s 57th season (54th consecutive) in the Football League. They competed in the 22-team Division One, then the top tier of English football, finishing seventeenth.

Ray Charnley was the club's top scorer for the seventh consecutive season, with 22 goals (21 in the league and one in the League Cup).

== Table ==
| Pos | Team | Pld | W | D | L | GF | GA | GAv | Pts |
|---|---|---|---|---|---|---|---|---|---|
| 15 | Sunderland | 42 | 14 | 9 | 19 | 64 | 74 | 0.865 | 37 |
| 16 | Aston Villa | 42 | 16 | 5 | 21 | 57 | 82 | 0.695 | 37 |
| 17 | Blackpool | 42 | 12 | 11 | 19 | 67 | 78 | 0.859 | 35 |
| 18 | Leicester City | 42 | 11 | 13 | 18 | 69 | 85 | 0.812 | 35 |
| 19 | Sheffield United | 42 | 12 | 11 | 19 | 50 | 64 | 0.781 | 35 |

Source: World Football
Rules for classification: 1) Points; 2) Goal average; 3) Goals scored
