= 1962–63 Blackpool F.C. season =

English football club season

Blackpool F.C.
1962–63 season
- Manager: Ron Suart
- Division One: 13th
- FA Cup: Third round
- League Cup: Second round
- Top goalscorer: League: Ray Charnley (22); All: Ray Charnley (22)
Home colours

The 1962–63 season was Blackpool F.C.'s 55th season (52nd consecutive) in the Football League. They competed in the 22-team Division One, then the top tier of English football, finishing thirteenth for the second consecutive season.

The Big Freeze of 1962–1963 was one of the coldest winters on record. Football matches in the English leagues suffered because of the severe effects of the winter weather. Matches in the fifth and sixth rounds, scheduled for 16 February and 9 March, were played on 16 and 30 March. A board known as the Pools Panel was set up to adjudicate postponed matches to provide the football pool results. Blackpool's FA Cup third-round tie with Norwich City was postponed eleven times before finally being played at Carrow Road on 4 March. The delays occurred before under-soil heating became common at major venues. When the thaw arrived, a backlog of fixtures had to be hastily determined. The Football League season was extended by four weeks from its original finishing date of 27 April. The final league fixtures took place one day before the rescheduled FA Cup final.

Ray Charnley was the club's top scorer for the fifth consecutive season, with 22 goals.

== Table ==
| Pos | Team | Pld | W | D | L | GF | GA | GAv | Pts |
|---|---|---|---|---|---|---|---|---|---|
| 11 | Blackburn Rovers | 42 | 15 | 12 | 15 | 79 | 71 | 1.113 | 42 |
| 12 | West Ham United | 42 | 14 | 12 | 16 | 73 | 69 | 1.058 | 40 |
| 13 | Blackpool | 42 | 13 | 14 | 15 | 58 | 64 | 0.906 | 40 |
| 14 | West Bromwich Albion | 42 | 16 | 7 | 19 | 71 | 79 | 0.899 | 39 |
| 15 | Aston Villa | 42 | 15 | 8 | 19 | 62 | 68 | 0.912 | 38 |

Source: World Football
Rules for classification: 1) Points; 2) Goal average; 3) Goals scored
