= 1963–64 Blackpool F.C. season =

English football club season

Blackpool F.C.
1963–64 season
- Manager: Ron Suart
- Division One: 18th
- FA Cup: Third round
- League Cup: Third round
- Top goalscorer: League: Alan Ball (13); All: Ray Charnley (15)
Home colours

The 1963–64 season was Blackpool F.C.'s 56th season (53rd consecutive) in the Football League. They competed in the 22-team Division One, then the top tier of English football, finishing eighteenth.

Ray Charnley was the club's top overall scorer for the sixth consecutive season, with fifteen goals. Alan Ball, meanwhile, was the club's top scorer in the league, with thirteen goals.

== Table ==
Pos	Team	Pld	W	D	L	GF	GA	GAv	Pts
16	Wolverhampton Wanderers	42	12	15	15	70	80	0.875	39
17	Stoke City	42	14	10	18	77	78	0.987	38
18	Blackpool	42	13	9	20	52	73	0.712	35
19	Aston Villa	42	11	12	19	62	71	0.873	34
20	Birmingham City	42	11	7	24	54	92	0.587	29

Source: World Football
Rules for classification: 1) Points; 2) Goal average; 3) Goals scored
