= 1961–62 Blackpool F.C. season =

English football club season

Blackpool F.C.
1961–62 season
- Manager: Ron Suart
- Division One: 13th
- FA Cup: Third round
- League Cup: Semi-finals
- Top goalscorer: League: Ray Charnley (30); All: Ray Charnley (36)
Home colours

The 1961–62 season was Blackpool F.C.'s 54th season (53rd consecutive) in the Football League. They competed in the 22-team Division One, then the top tier of English football, finishing thirteenth.

Blackpool also made it to the semi-finals of the League Cup. They were eliminated by Norwich City 4–3 on aggregate. Norwich won 4–1 at Carrow Road; Blackpool won 2–0 at Bloomfield Road.

Ray Charnley was the club's top scorer for the fourth consecutive season, with 36 goals (30 in the league and six in the League Cup).

== Table ==
Pos	Team	Pld	W	D	L	GF	GA	GAv	Pts
11	Bolton Wanderers	42	16	10	16	62	66	0.939	42
12	Manchester City	42	17	7	18	78	81	0.963	41
13	Blackpool	42	15	11	16	70	75	0.933	41
14	Leicester City	42	17	6	19	72	71	1.014	40
15	Manchester United	42	15	9	18	72	75	0.960	39

Source: World Football
Rules for classification: 1) Points; 2) Goal average; 3) Goals scored
