= Ron Suart =

English footballer (1920–2015)

Personal information
- Full name: Ronald Suart
- Date of birth: 18 November 1920
- Place of birth: Barrow-in-Furness, England
- Date of death: 25 March 2015 (aged 94)
- Place of death: Surrey, England
- Position: Defender

Senior career*
Years	Team	Apps	(Gls)
1946–1949	Blackpool	103	(0)
1949–1955	Blackburn Rovers	176	(0)
1955–1956	Wigan Athletic	23	(0)
Total		302	(0)

Managerial career
- 1955–1956: Wigan Athletic
- 1956–1958: Scunthorpe & Lindsey United
- 1958–1967: Blackpool
- 1974–1975: Chelsea
- * Club domestic league appearances and goals

Ronald Suart (18 November 1920 – 25 March 2015) was an English football player and manager. His only honour was winning the Division Three North championship as manager of Scunthorpe & Lindsey United in 1957–58.

== Playing days ==
Born in Barrow-in-Furness, Suart started his career as a full-back at Blackpool. He played alongside fellow defenders George Farrow and Harry Johnston in a team which also included Stanley Matthews and Stan Mortensen. Blackpool reached the 1948 FA Cup Final, but Suart missed it through injury. He transferred to Blackburn Rovers in 1949, before retiring in 1955. A 29 August 1953 issue of Soccer Star magazine described Suart as "capable at right and left-back as he is when taking over the centre-half position. A fine man to have in any defence."

== Managerial career ==
Suart took over at Wigan Athletic as player-manager, making 34 appearances in all competitions during the 1955-56 season. He left the club join Scunthorpe & Lindsey United in 1956. After leading the club to promotion as Division Three North champions in 1957-58 he returned to Blackpool — the first ex-Seasider to return to the club as manager — who were then in the First Division. "I intend to work really hard at Blackpool," he said. "I have my own plans and, with the co-operation of the directors, players, staff and public, I am sure they will work out to the good. Following a man like Joe Smith, with his wonderful record, will not be easy, but I feel confident, and the thought of managing the club I once played for gives me a great thrill."

Suart managed to retain Blackpool's place in the top tier for the next eight seasons and reached the League Cup semi-finals in 1962, losing to eventual winners Norwich City. While at Blackpool, he helped unearth future England internationals Alan Ball, Ray Charnley, and Emlyn Hughes, though with the abolition of the maximum wage and the new freedom which players had, he was unable to prevent many of his star players moving on. He resigned in January 1967, four months before Blackpool were relegated to Division Two, and was succeeded by Stan Mortensen. He remains Blackpool's second-longest-serving manager behind Joe Smith.

Suart became assistant manager to Tommy Docherty at Chelsea, where he spent seven years. Docherty left the club in October, and Suart briefly became caretaker manager. His services were retained by new manager Dave Sexton. He was with the club as they won the FA Cup in 1970 and the Cup Winners' Cup in 1971, but declined thereafter. When Sexton was sacked in October 1974 after a poor start to the season, Suart took charge of the first team. However, he was unable to prevent the club's slide towards relegation and was replaced by Eddie McCreadie the following April. He later became a scout at Wimbledon but, with the club in heavy financial trouble, he was released in February 2002.

== Death ==
Suart died on 25 March 2015, aged 94, in Surrey.

== Honours ==
Scunthorpe & Lindsey United

- Division Three North: 1957–58
