= 1946–47 Blackpool F.C. season =

English football club season

Blackpool F.C.
1946–47 season
- Manager: Joe Smith
- Division One: 5th
- FA Cup: Third round
- Top goalscorer: League: Stan Mortensen (28); All: Stan Mortensen (29)
- Highest home attendance: 28,907 (v. Preston North End)
- Lowest home attendance: 14,501 (v. Leeds United)
Home colours

The 1946–47 season was Blackpool F.C.'s 39th season (36th consecutive) in the Football League. They competed in the 22-team Division One, then the top tier of English football, finishing fifth.

New signings included John Crosland (from local club Ansdell Rovers), George Dick, Jimmy McIntosh (from Preston North End), George McKnight, Sammy Nelson and Eddie Shimwell (from Sheffield United). Out went, amongst others, Dai Astley, Dick Burke, Malcolm Butler, the prolific goalscorer Jock Dodds (to Shamrock Rovers), Bobby Finan, Frank O'Donnell (to Aston Villa) and Alec Roxburgh.

Stan Mortensen was the club's top scorer for the third consecutive season, with 29 goals (28 in the league and one in the FA Cup).

== Season review ==
Blackpool's first league game took them to Yorkshire to face Huddersfield Town on 31 August. Stan Mortensen, Jimmy Blair and Alex Munro got the visitors' goals in a 3–1 victory.

Three more victories followed: 4–2 against Brentford at Bloomfield Road (Mortensen, Willie Buchan (two) and Jimmy McIntosh the scorers), 2–0 at home to Wolverhampton Wanderers (George Eastham and Mortensen), and 1–0 at Portsmouth (Eastham).

Eastham scored two more goals in the next game, at Sunderland, making it four in three games, but Blackpool lost 3–2.

Another four-game win streak ended September and began October: 1–0 at home to Aston Villa (Mortensen) on 21 September, 4–3 at home to Portsmouth two days later (a Buchan hat-trick and Blair), 2–1 at Derby County (Mortensen and McIntosh), and 2–1 against Arsenal at Bloomfield Road (Mortensen and debutant George Dick).

On 12 October, Blackpool lost at Preston North End 0–2 in the first West Lancashire derby of the season.

A week later, Blackpool hosted Manchester United at Bloomfield Road and won 3–1, with George Farrow, Mortensen, and Dick the scorers for the home side.

Blackpool recorded their first draw of the campaign on 26 October — 1–1 at Bolton Wanderers, McIntosh getting the Seasiders' goal.

Chelsea visited Bloomfield Road on 2 November, and they returned to the capital pointless after a single-goal defeat. Blair scored the goal.

Blackpool travelled to Sheffield United the following weekend and lost 4–2. A Mortensen penalty and an Eastham strike accounted for the Blackpool half of the scoreline.

Two more defeats ensued — 2–3 at Grimsby Town (McIntosh and Mortensen) and 2–4 at Leeds United (Hugh O'Donnell, in his only appearance of the season, and Mortensen).

Blackpool got back to winning ways on 30 November with a 3–2 result against Liverpool at home. McIntosh, Blair and Mortensen were the scorers for the hosts.

Into December, Blackpool travelled to Stoke City and lost 4–1 (Dick getting the Blackpool goal), before a heavy 5–0 home defeat at the hands of Middlesbrough.

On 21 December, Blackpool visited Charlton Athletic, where a Buchan penalty was enough to give them both points.

On Christmas Day, Blackpool travelled to Lancashire neighbours Blackburn Rovers. Mortensen scored Blackpool's goal in a 1–1 draw.

The following day, the return fixture, saw the first all-ticket game at Bloomfield Road. Mortensen's goal, his fourteenth of the season, gave Blackpool the victory.

On 28 December, Huddersfield Town visited Bloomfield Road, and goals by Dick and Buchan (a penalty) gave Blackpool a 2–1 win.

The first game of 1947 took Blackpool to Wolves, where they lost 3–1 (Mortensen getting the visitors' goal).

On 11 January, Blackpool travelled to Hillsborough for an FA Cup third-round tie with Sheffield Wednesday. Wednesday won 4–1, with Mortensen scoring Blackpool's goal.

Sunderland completed the double over Blackpool on 18 January with a 5–0 victory.

A draw followed, at Aston Villa, 1–1, with Mortensen again finding the net for Blackpool.

On 1 February, Blackpool recorded one more in the win column with a 2–1 edging of Derby County at Bloomfield Road, Munro and Dick getting the goals.

Seven days later, Blackpool travelled to London to face Arsenal and drew 1–1, Mortensen adding to his season's tally.

The Tangerines exacted revenge on arch-rivals Preston North End after their 2–0 victory back in October by beating them 4–0 at Bloomfield Road on 15 February. Dick and Mortensen scored two apiece.

Blackpool's joy was short-lived, however: they lost 3–0 at Manchester United seven days later, and then by a single goal at home to Bolton Wanderers.

For the fourth time this season, Blackpool strung four consecutive wins together, beginning on 8 March at Chelsea. Dick (two), Buchan and Mortensen were the Blackpool scorers in the 4–1 scoreline. They also beat Sheffield United at home 4–2 (Mortensen, Munro and another Dick double), Grimsby Town away, 3–2 (two from Mortensen and one from George McKnight), and Leeds United at home, 3–0, with the same scorers.

On 4 April, Blackpool drew 1–1 with Everton at Goodison Park. Blackpool's goal came from a T. G. Jones own-goal.

Blackpool remained in Liverpool for the following day's game at Anfield. The visitors won 3–2, with Mortensen (two) and Buchan getting their goals. It remained their last League double over the eventual champions for 64 years.

Everton travelled to Bloomfield Road two days later and won 3–0.

Blackpool suffered a second consecutive home defeat (0–2 on this occasion) when Stoke City visited on 12 April.

Middlesbrough hosted Blackpool the following week, and goals from Eastham and Mortensen gave the visitors both points in a 2–1 scoreline.

The season was rounded off on 28 April with a visit by Charlton Athletic to Bloomfield Road. The match finished goalless.

== Table ==
Pos	Team	Pld	W	D	L	GF	GA	GAv	Pts
3	Wolverhampton Wanderers	42	25	6	11	98	56	1.750	56
4	Stoke City	42	24	7	11	90	53	1.698	55
5	Blackpool	42	22	6	14	71	70	1.014	50
6	Sheffield United	42	21	7	14	89	75	1.187	49
7	Preston North End	42	18	11	13	76	74	1.027	47

Source: World Football
Rules for classification: 1) Points; 2) Goal average; 3) Goals scored

== Player statistics ==
=== Appearances ===
==== League ====
- Jock Wallace – 42
- Harry Johnston – 40
- Stan Mortensen – 40
- George Dick – 31
- Bill Lewis – 31
- George Farrow – 28
- Jimmy McIntosh – 28
- Eric Sibley – 26
- Jimmy Blair – 25
- Alec Munro – 24
- Willie Buchan – 23
- George Eastham – 22
- Eddie Shimwell – 21
- Ron Suart – 21
- Eric Hayward – 20
- Tom Buchan – 9
- Sammy Nelson – 9
- George McKnight – 7
- Hugh Kelly – 6
- Gordon Kennedy – 5
- John Crosland – 4
- Hugh O'Donnell – 1

Players used: 22

No appearances: Ewan Fenton

==== FA Cup ====
- Willie Buchan – 1
- George Dick – 1
- George Farrow – 1
- Harry Johnston – 1
- Jimmy McIntosh – 1
- Stan Mortensen – 1
- Alec Munro – 1
- Eddie Shimwell – 1
- Eric Sibley – 1
- Ron Suart – 1
- Jock Wallace – 1

Players used: 11

=== Goals ===
==== League ====
- Stan Mortensen – 28
- George Dick – 11
- Willie Buchan – 9
- George Eastham – 6
- Jimmy McIntosh – 5
- Jimmy Blair – 4
- Alec Munro – 3
- George McKnight – 2
- George Farrow – 1
- Hugh O'Donnell – 1

Goals scored: 70 (plus one own-goal)

==== FA Cup ====
- Stan Mortensen – 1

Goals scored: 1
