= West Lancashire derby =

Rivalry in English football

- Other names: M55 derby
- Location: Lancashire, England
- Teams: Blackpool; Preston North End
- First meeting: Blackpool 1–4 Preston North End; 1901–02 Football League; (23 November 1901)
- Latest meeting: Preston North End 3–1 Blackpool; 2022–23 EFL Championship; (1 April 2023)
- Stadiums: Bloomfield Road (Blackpool); Deepdale (Preston)

Statistics
- Total meetings: 98
- Most wins: Preston North End (47)
- All-time series: Blackpool (32); Drawn (19); Preston North End (47)
- Largest victory: Preston North End 0–7 Blackpool; 1947–48 Football League; (1 May 1948)

The West Lancashire derby (sometimes also known as the M55 derby) is a local rivalry in English football between Lancashire clubs Blackpool and Preston North End. The derby has taken place across all four tiers of English football, but not the top flight since the formation of the Premier League. Blackpool were promoted to the Premier League in 2010; Preston North End have yet to reach it. They did not meet in the League between the 2009–10 and 2020–21 seasons, but did so again in the 2021–22 EFL Championship campaign following Blackpool's promotion from the third tier.

The first West Lancashire derby took place on 23 November 1901 at Blackpool's Bloomfield Road. In front of a crowd of 6,000, Preston won 4–1. There have been 97 meetings between the two clubs in all competitions, with North End winning 47 to Blackpool's 32. The remaining 19 matches have been draws.

== Background ==
The derby is also known as the M55 derby because the town of Blackpool and city of Preston are at either end of the M55 motorway. The clubs' stadiums – Bloomfield Road and Deepdale, respectively – are seventeen miles apart. In the 2003 The Football Fans Census, fans of both clubs listed the derby as being the main derby, with both sets of fans agreeing that the other club is their main rival. Based on the survey, it was one of only 44 such rivalries in England.

Preston player Tom Finney, who played for the Lilywhites from 1946 to 1960, said: "We always saw Blackpool as our main rivals and we had some great matches against them. But there was none of the current nastiness from some fans." While Blackpool player Jimmy Armfield, who played for the Seasiders from 1954 to 1971, said: "The rivalry is mainly between the fans. It started with arguments over whether Stanley Matthews was better than Tom Finney in the '50s."

Ahead of the first derby of the 2008–09 season at Bloomfield Road on 15 November 2008, which Preston won 3–1, Blackpool chairman Karl Oyston said: "As chairman I get excited. It's difficult not to. I feel like telling the manager to feed the players on raw meat all week. I absolutely understand the rivalry, I am probably the person with the fiercest tribal views you can get. It's not to be under-estimated how strongly I feel about this game."

Preston fans refer to Blackpool and their fans as Donkey Lashers, in reference to the walking of donkeys along Blackpool beach. Likewise, Blackpool fans refer to Preston and their fans as Nobbers using an amendment of the word North from Preston North End, which is changed to Nob and sometimes Knob. Gary Peters, who was Preston manager from 1994 to 1998, took the rivalry so seriously that he would not use the word "Blackpool" in public, always referring to the club as "that lot with the tower".

In 2008, journalist Andy Mitten's book, Mad for It: From Blackpool to Barcelona: Football's Greatest Rivalries, included the derby as one of a number of "classic football derby matches".

== Matches ==
Chart of yearly table positions of the derby participants in the football league.

Matches between the two clubs have at times had significant consequences. For example, on 30 April 1904, Blackpool visited Deepdale for the final game of the season, and the home side's single-goal victory gave them the Division Two championship, edging out Woolwich Arsenal.

In 1912–13, Preston won the Division Two championship (and fellow Lancastrians Burnley were also promoted) while Blackpool finished bottom of the table. The Seasiders, however, were successful in their re-application to the League.

On 4 May 1921, Blackpool played a benefit match against Preston, with the proceeds going to the widow of Seasiders defender Horace Fairhurst, who died in February after suffering on-field head injury, and to the children of his partner at full-back, Bert Tulloch, whose wife had died the same weekend as Fairhurst.

It was until November 1925, at the sixth attempt, that Blackpool recorded their first home success against Preston. A brace by Bert Fishwick, together with a goal by Billy Meredith, gave the Seasiders a 3–1 victory.

Between 1946 and 1961, the derby took place in the top flight of English football for all but two seasons, with both clubs playing in the First Division. In the 1947–48 season both clubs were joint-favourites to win the FA Cup; however, Preston lost 4–1 to Manchester United in the quarter-finals while Blackpool made it to the final, in which they lost 4–2 to Manchester United.

On 1 May 1948, at Deepdale, Blackpool inflicted what still remains Preston's record loss in the Football League: 7–0. Jimmy McIntosh scored five goals and Alex Munro and Walter Rickett scored one apiece. The 1950s saw eighteen matches between the two clubs in the top flight in English football.

A record attendance at Bloomfield Road was set for the 9 October 1954 meeting of the two clubs. 36,204 witnessed a 2–1 victory for the visitors.

On 29 October 1955, in a 6–2 victory for Preston North End, George Farm became one of the few goalkeepers to score a goal. He injured a shoulder and replaced Jackie Mudie at centre-forward, where he proceeded to open the scoring with his head.

Blackpool ruined Preston North End's Christmas of 1958 with a festive double in the space of twenty-four hours. The Seasiders inflicted a 4–2 Christmas Day defeat on their neighbours at Bloomfield Road. When the two sides met again, on Boxing Day at Deepdale, the visitors were 3–0 victors.

During the first half of a friendly between the two clubs on 15 August 1966 came the news that Alan Ball had been transferred to Everton for a fee of £112,000. Ball was left on the bench, alongside Emlyn Hughes. Blackpool won this match, plus the two other meetings played inside seven days.

One of the most significant West Lancashire derbies took place on 13 April 1970, at Deepdale. Blackpool won the Second Division match 3–0, a result which saw them promoted back to the First Division, which was then the top flight, while the result later assisted in Preston's being relegated to the Third Division for the first time in the club's history. Blackpool striker Fred Pickering scored a hat-trick in front of a crowd of over 34,000 – over 15,000 of whom travelled from Blackpool, with another 3,000 Tangerines fans locked outside the stadium. Jimmy Armfield later said of that night: "The real rivalry started that night. It was such a significant result for both teams. Many [Blackpool fans] walked back to Blackpool and our bus passed them on the way home, dancing and singing by the road." Blackpool's joy was short-lived, however, as they spent just one season in the First Division before being relegated the next year.

In the 1972–73 season, Alan Ainscow scored his only hat-trick when Blackpool won 3–0 at Deepdale on 9 December 1972.

Alan Suddick scored his 100th League goal, a penalty, in Blackpool's 3–0 victory at Bloomfield Road on 23 March 1974. It was the last West Lancashire derby to take place at Bloomfield Road for fourteen years.

The two clubs met at Deepdale in the Anglo-Scottish Cup on 4 August 1979. With Preston leading 3–1 in the final minute, Blackpool goalkeeper Tom McAlister saved Ricky Thomson's penalty, tipping the ball onto the bar. It bounced down over the line, but by then the referee Ashley had blown his whistle to signal the end of the game. The goal did not count, but the spectators went home in the belief that the scoreline was 3–2. The official explained to Thomson and McAlister that the moment the ball had stopped travelling forwards the game was over and ruled it had ended the moment McAlister touched the ball. They met on two other occasions in the same competition: on 2 August 1978 at Deepdale (Preston won 4–2) and on 5 August 1980 at Bloomfield Road (Blackpool won 1–0).

In the Football League Group Cup at Deepdale on 15 August 1981, Preston won 2–1.

In the Lancashire Manx Cup, the two clubs met on several occasions. Firstly, on 17 August 1982, Blackpool won 2–1 at Bloomfield Road. 364 days later, the fixture was repeated, this time with the visitors winning 3–2. Two years later, on 3 August 1985, Blackpool won 2–1 at Deepdale. They did not meet again until 9 August 1988, when the teams drew 1–1 at Bloomfield Road. The following season, on 8 August 1989, Blackpool won 2–0 at home in the final meeting of the two clubs in the competition.

With both clubs languishing in the lower tiers of the Football League, some consolation came for Preston in the 1992–93 season, when they won 3–2 at Bloomfield Road, with Tony Ellis scoring a hat-trick.

On 17 April 1999, Brett Ormerod scored an injury-time winner for Blackpool at Deepdale.

The following campaign, after Preston's 3–0 Division Two victory over Blackpool at Deepdale on 18 December 1999, Nigel Worthington resigned as Blackpool manager.

The 1999–2000 season was also significant for Preston, who were then under the management of David Moyes. Their draw at Bloomfield Road in April 2000 assisted in their promotion from Division Two to the second tier of English football for the first time in twenty years. Later that month, Preston were crowned champions, while by the end of the season Blackpool were relegated to Division Three, the bottom division of the Football League, leaving two divisions between the clubs. The two clubs did not play each other for another seven years, during which time Preston finished fourth in their first season in Division One and reached the play-offs, losing out on promotion to the Premier League to Bolton Wanderers in the final. Two further play-off appearances followed, in 2004–05, when they again reached the final, and the following season, when they reached the semi-finals. Meanwhile, Blackpool languished in the bottom two divisions, before finally winning promotion back to the second tier (the Championship) in the 2006–07 season.

The two teams competed in the second tier between 2006–07 and 2009–10, at which point Blackpool won promotion to the Premier League for the first time and a return the top flight for the first time in 39 years. Blackpool survived in the Premier League for one season, but Preston were also relegated from the second tier to League One.

Four years later, at the end of the 2014–15 campaign, Blackpool dropped to the third tier for the first time since 2006–07. Preston, meanwhile, ended a run of nine consecutive unsuccessful appearances in the play-offs and returned to the second tier after four seasons away.

The 2020–21 season saw Blackpool promoted to the Championship. In October 2021 they won 2-0 at home, while Preston won the return game 1-0, while celebrating what would have been the 100th birthday of Tom Finney, who is considered to be Preston's greatest player.

=== Head-to-head record ===
Preston have won 15 more West Lancashire derbies than Blackpool, with 47 victories compared to Blackpool's 32. There have been 19 draws. The teams have met three times in the FA Cup, with Preston winning on each occasion. Blackpool have also never beaten Preston in the League Cup — Preston winning four, with the other drawn.

Competition	Played	Blackpool	Draw	Preston North End
League	90	32	18	40
FA Cup	3	0	0	3
League Cup	5	0	1	4
Totals	98	32	19	47

Current as of 1 April 2023. Statistics obtained from Soccerbase.

== Crossing the divide ==
At least 53 individuals have represented both Blackpool and Preston North End at some point in their careers. 28 of these moved directly between the two clubs. One such example is Tony Ellis, who had two spells with Preston, in 1987–1989 and 1992–1994, and was Player of the Year in his final two seasons with the Lilywhites. During his second spell at the club, he scored a hat-trick for Preston at Bloomfield Road in a 3–2 Preston victory. However, after a much-publicised fall out with Preston manager John Beck over a new contract and his role within the club, Ellis signed for Blackpool for £165,000.

Players moving directly between the two clubs was more prevalent in the first half of the 20th century. Albert Brown moved from Preston North End to Blackpool in 1905, and Benny Green did the same in 1913. Billy Tremelling moved in the opposite direction in 1930, as did Jimmy McIntosh and Dickie Watmough in 1937. As part of the same deal, Frank O'Donnell exchanged the white of Preston for Blackpool tangerine, and his brother, Hugh, followed him two years later. In 1967, Ray Charnley moved from Bloomfield Road to Deepdale.

The most recent of these occurred in 2015, when Northern Irish striker Andy Little moved directly to Blackpool on loan from Preston.

Players who have moved directly between the two clubs:

- Tom Bradshaw: Blackpool (1896), Preston North End (1896 and 1902)
- Laurence Halsall: Blackpool (1897), Preston North End (1897–1899)
- Wilf Gillow: Blackpool to Preston North End
- Lawrence Cook, Blackpool (1904), Preston North End (1905–1906)
- Albert Brown: Preston North End (1904–1905), Blackpool (1905–1906)
- Herbert Crossthwaite: Preston North End (1905–1906), Blackpool (1906–1907)
- Benny Green: Preston North End (1911–1913), Blackpool (1913–1915)
- Billy Mercer: Preston North End (1919–1924), Blackpool (1925)
- Peter Quinn: Blackpool (1910–1920), Preston North End (1920–1922)
- Bobby Crawford: Preston North End (1921–1932), Blackpool (1932–1933)
- Billy Tremelling: Blackpool (1925–1930), Preston North End (1930–1937)
- Jimmy McClelland: Preston North End (1929–1930), Blackpool (1930–1933)
- Albert Butterworth: Blackpool (1932–1933), Preston North End (1933–1935)
- Jimmy McIntosh: Blackpool (1935–1937), Preston North End (1937–1946), Blackpool (1946–1948)
- Dickie Watmough: Blackpool (1934–1937), Preston North End (1937)
- Frank O'Donnell: Preston North End (1935–1937), Blackpool (1937–1946)
- Hugh O'Donnell: Preston North End (1935–1939), Blackpool (1939–1946)
- Billy McIntosh: Preston North End (1946–1948), Blackpool (1948–1951)
- Les Campbell: Preston North End (1953–1960), Blackpool (1960–1961)
- Kit Napier: Blackpool (1960–1963), Preston North End (1963–1964)
- Ray Charnley: Blackpool (1957–1967), Preston North End (1967–1968)
- Gerry Ingram: Blackpool (1967–1968), Preston North End (1968–1971)
- Andy McAteer: Preston North End (1977–1986), Blackpool (1986–1988), Preston North End (1988–1989)
- Tony Ellis: Preston North End (1987–1989 and 1992–1994), Blackpool (1994–1997)
- Gary Parkinson: Preston North End (1997–2001), Blackpool (2001–2002)
- Andrew Lonergan Preston North End (2000–2011), Blackpool (2003)
- Brett Ormerod: Preston North End (2006–2009), Blackpool (2009–2012)^{[a]}
- Andy Little: Preston North End (2014–2016), Blackpool (2015)

Players who have appeared for both clubs at some point during their career:

- Fred Griffiths: Blackpool (1899–1900), Preston North End (1902)
- James Mitchell: Blackpool (1914–1915), Preston North End (1920–1922)
- Gordon Milne: Preston North End (1956–1960), Blackpool (1967–1970)
- Mel Holden: Preston North End (1972–1975), Blackpool (1978–1979)
- Barry Siddall: Blackpool (1983–1984 and 1986–1989), Preston North End (1992–1993)
- Mike Conroy: Preston North End (1993–1995), Blackpool (1998–1999)
- David Eyres: Blackpool (1989–1993), Preston North End (1997–2000)
- Mike Flynn: Preston North End (1989–1993), Blackpool (2003–2004)
- Colin Greenall: Blackpool (1980–1986), Preston North End (1992–1993)
- Colin Hendry: Preston North End (2002, loan), Blackpool (2002–2003)
- Michael Jackson: Preston North End (1997–2004), Blackpool (2006–2008)
- Adam Nowland: Blackpool (1998–2001), Preston North End (2005–2008)
- Brett Ormerod: Blackpool (1997–2001, 2009–2012), Preston North End (2006–2009)^{[a]}
- Marlon Broomes: Preston North End (2002–2005), Blackpool (2008–2009)
- Matt Hill: Preston North End (2005–2008), Blackpool (2011–2012)
- Ricardo Fuller: Preston North End (2002–2004), Blackpool (2013–2014)
- Eddie Nolan: Preston North End (2008–2011), Blackpool (2016–2017)
- Tom Barkhuizen: Blackpool (2010–2015), Preston North End (2017–2022)
- Alex Baptiste: Blackpool (2008-2013), Preston North End (2016–2017)
- Brad Potts: Blackpool (2015-2017), Preston North End (2019–present)
- Nick Anderton: Preston North End (2014–2016), Blackpool (2017–2020)
- Chris Maxwell: Preston North End (2016–2020), Blackpool (2020–2023)
- Josh Bowler: Blackpool (2021–2022 and 2023, loan), Preston North End (2024–2025, loan), Blackpool (2025–)
- Josh Onomah: Preston North End (2023), Blackpool (2024–2025)
- Jordan Thompson: Blackpool (2018–2020), Preston North End (2025–)

Seven players who played for one club went on to manage the other:

- Sydney Beaumont, who played one league game for Preston North End in 1911–12, was manager of Blackpool for the 1927–28 season
- Sam Allardyce, who played for Preston North End from 1986 to 1989 and also in 1992, was manager of Blackpool from 1994 to 1996
- Paul Simpson, who played for Blackpool from 2000 to 2002, was manager of Preston North End from 2006 to 2007
- Phil Brown, who played for and coached Blackpool under Allardyce between 1994 and 1996, was named manager of Preston North End in January 2011
- Michael Appleton, who played for Preston North End between 1997 and 2001, was appointed Blackpool manager in both 2012 and 2022
- Simon Grayson, who both played for and managed Blackpool, was appointed Preston manager in February 2013
- Neil McDonald, who played and coached at Preston, was appointed Blackpool manager in June 2015

Prior to the 4 April 1958 derby at Bloomfield Road, Blackpool manager Joe Smith commented: "Every time we play Preston, something nearly always happens. This was one weekend when we wanted something like a full-strength team. Still, I expect the two youngsters [Starkey and Gregson] to play with enthusiasm." Preston won 2–1, but one critic wrote: "The good thing in the match from Blackpool's point of view was the showings of Starkey and Gregson. Starkey showed just what hard grafting can achieve, while his application of the game was most promising. Both can be developed."

a Brett Ormerod had his contract cancelled at Preston North End so that he could sign for Blackpool without transferring directly between the two clubs.

== Supporters ==
On 6 May 1978, at a concert by The Vibrators in Preston, a young man from Preston was stabbed to death during clashes between Preston and Blackpool fans. In 1996 there were 78 arrests when serious disorder broke out when the clubs met at Deepdale and pubs were trashed in Preston. The match was played on a Friday night and broadcast live on Sky. This derby saw significant disorder – including several pitch invasions – and was dubbed the "Night of Shame" by both the Lancashire Evening Post and the Blackpool Gazette.

Another fan died, this time of natural causes, on 17 April 1999. Kevin Halliwell, a 47-year-old lifelong Blackpool fan, collapsed just minutes before kick-off at Deepdale and died before reaching the Royal Preston Hospital.

Despite there being no match between the two clubs since 2000, the rivalry between the two sets of fans reignited itself on 2 September 2006, when a mini-riot broke out on Preston railway station between Blackpool fans returning from their match at Millwall and local Preston fans returning from an England match in Manchester. Bottles, cans and signs were hurled as the two sets of fans fought each other, and two British Transport Police officers were injured in what the police described as a large-scale disorder.

Blackpool were promoted to the Championship at the end of the 2006–07 season, winning the play-off final at Wembley. Promotion ensured that the rivalry with Preston North End would once again happen on the pitch with each club being in the Championship in the 2007–08 season. In June 2007, following threats from Blackpool and Preston hooligans to cause mayhem when the two clubs meet, Preston's top police officer, Chief Superintendent Mike Barton, warned that "The history of these derbies means we will have to have a significant policing operation both at Deepdale and Bloomfield Road." This led to the police making plans for "significant operations" at the two matches involving the clubs. In November 2007 Blackpool police warned football hooligans not to attend the match in Preston on 8 December 2007. The Blackpool Gazette reported on 17 November 2007, how comments on a message board used by the Blackpool Muckers hooligan firm claimed that Blackpool fans were planning to infiltrate the home stands at the Deepdale stadium in Preston, with members of the Preston hooligan firm also posting threats. The match had already been moved forward to a 12:30 pm kick off at the request of the police in an attempt to avoid violence and local pubs told not to open until 12:00 pm and not to serve alcohol until 12:30 pm, the same time as the kick off.

Blackpool won the match 1–0. However, the day saw outbreaks of violence in both Preston and Blackpool. A huge police operation saw 300 police officers on duty outside Deepdale and in Preston city centre while 19 people were arrested. Blackpool fans arriving at Preston railway station went through airport-style security scanners to check for potential weapons. Blackpool hooligans went on a rampage smashing windows and ripping seats out of specially chartered buses laid on to transport them from the railway station to Deepdale, causing thousands of pounds worth of damage. Nine people were arrested. Later that same day, a group of about 30 Preston hooligans attacked a pub in Blackpool in "revenge" throwing bins and bottles at the pub while staff and customers were inside.

The return fixture on 15 March 2008 at Bloomfield Road, was marred by racist and homophobic chanting. Nine Blackpool fans were immediately banned from the stadium for twelve months. Two fans were arrested at the match on suspicion of racial disorder. Blackpool F.C. and the police said they would be investigating whether to ban any additional fans. Some Preston fans were accused of homophobic chants and some Blackpool fans accused of racist chants. The Football Association stated that they were awaiting the Referees report before making a decision about whether to take any action.

Three Blackpool fans were arrested at Deepdale on 13 February 2010, when two flares were lit on the Kop during the 0–0 draw.

While Blackpool fans travelled to Wembley for their 2010 Championship play-off final with Cardiff City on 22 May 2010, Preston fans hung a banner over a flyover on the M55 saying "Forever in Our Shadow". Then on 7 May 2011, a plane flew twice over Deepdale with trailing banners taunting Preston for their relegation from The Championship. The aircraft trailed two banners over the stadium reading: "Poor Little Preston Enjoy League One" and "We Are Superior, Love Blackpool FC." Preston manager Phil Brown called the stunt "distasteful", adding, "if I had a gun I would have shot the plane down". The club, however, reacted by taking the stunt in good humour issuing a statement saying: "We can see the funny side of the joke and accept that with any setback you will always have opposition supporters ready to poke fun."

Three days later on 12 May, in an episode of the Channel 4 quiz show Countdown, the conundrum 'PNECRISIS' appeared at the show's conclusion, a deliberate reference put in by the show's producer, Damian Eadie, a lifelong Blackpool fan.

By contrast to the violence that sometimes surrounds the West Lancashire derby, fans of both clubs have joined to raise money for local charities. In March 2007, Blackpool and Preston fans joined for a seventeen-mile sponsored bicycle ride between Deepdale and Bloomfield Road in aid of the Brian House Children's Hospice in Bispham, Blackpool, and Derian House Children's Hospice in Chorley. Dubbed as "To Hell and Back", about 140 cyclists took part.

In August 2013, Preston hosted Blackpool in the League Cup at Deepdale, the first meeting between the two clubs since 2010. Preston won the game by a single goal, but the victory was marred by a pitch invasion by Preston supporters after the final whistle, with a pitch steward being trampled by a police horse during the incident. The FA later announced via a spokesman that they would look into the disorder, with a local senior police officer condemning the fans' behaviour as "absolutely disgraceful".

== Popular culture ==
In April 2008, football magazine FourFourTwo ran a four-page article about the derby, entitled "Sheep Shaggers vs Donkey Lashers". The article concentrated on events around the match at Deepdale in December 2007, and the history of the derby.
