= George Dick (footballer) =

Scottish football player and manager (1921–1960)

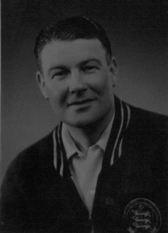

Personal information
- Full name: George White Dick
- Date of birth: 12 June 1921
- Place of birth: Torphichen, Scotland
- Date of death: 7 September 1960 (aged 39)
- Place of death: Carlisle, England
- Position: Outside left

Senior career*
Years	Team	Apps	(Gls)
1946–1948	Blackpool	47	(13)
1948–1949	West Ham United	14	(1)
1949–1951	Carlisle United	52	(23)
1951	Stockport County	25	(12)
1951–1953	Workington	56	(16)

Managerial career
- 1953–1955: Racing Club Ghent
- 1957–1958: Boldklubben 1909
- 1958–1959: Galatasaray
- 1959–1960: Boldklubben 1909
- * Club domestic league appearances and goals

George White Dick (12 June 1921 – 7 September 1960) was a Scottish Guardsman, B.A.O.R. cruiserweight boxing champion, and professional football player and manager.

After leaving the army, while making up his mind whether to take a letter of recommendation to a London club, Dick worked as a waiter in Blackpool. He asked Joe Smith, Blackpool F.C. manager, for a trial in August 1946, and within ten minutes was signed on. He played in the 1948 FA Cup Final for Blackpool against Manchester United. He also wrote training manuals and was one of the first qualified FA coaches. He managed Galatasaray in Turkey on two occasions. His life was cut short when he was killed in a road accident in 1960.

== Football career ==
=== Playing ===
Dick began his professional career in 1946 with Blackpool. He made his debut for the club in their tenth league game of the 1946–47 campaign, against Arsenal at Bloomfield Road on 5 October 1946. Wearing the number 8 shirt, he scored the hosts' second goal (Stan Mortensen scored the first).

Dick scoring with a header against Everton at Bloomfield Road on 3 January 1948.

Dick went on to make a further 30 league and one FA Cup appearances that season. He scored eleven goals in the league, and finished second-top scorer behind Mortensen. Aside from his debut goal, his other strikes came against Manchester United (home, 3–1, 19 October); Stoke City (away, 1–4, 7 December); Huddersfield Town (home, 2–1, 28 December); Derby County (home, 2–1, 1 February 1947); Preston North End (two goals) (home, 4–0, 15 February); Chelsea (two goals) (away, 4–1, 8 March); and Sheffield United (two goals) (home, 4–2, 15 March).

In the 1947–48 season, Dick made sixteen league appearances, scoring two goals. Both goals came in a 5–0 victory over Everton at the seaside on 3 January 1948, which was George Farrow's last game for Blackpool. He also played in each of Blackpool's six FA Cup ties, including their unsuccessful appearance in the final against Manchester United, in what proved to be his final game for the club. He scored one of their goals in the 4–0 victory over Leeds United in the third round.

In August 1948, Dick was sold to West Ham for £7,000. He remained with the Hammers for a season, at the end of which he moved north to sign for Carlisle United. Two years later, in October 1951, he joined Stockport County for a short spell.

In late 1951 he signed for Workington. He retired, as captain, from the playing side of the game two years later.

=== Coaching ===
Ghent (Belgium), U.S. Army (Germany), Galatasaray, B.1909 (Denmark)

1953–55 July 1953 Royal Racing Club de Ghent (Belgium)

1956 U.S. army coach based in Germany, 5 August travelled for interview for position with Galatasaray

1957 Boldklubben.1909 Denmark

1958–59 Galatasaray

1959–60 Boldklubben 1909 Denmark, won championship Danish Champions 1959

== Honours ==
Blackpool

- FA Cup runner-up: 1947–48
