= 1943 Football League War Cup final =

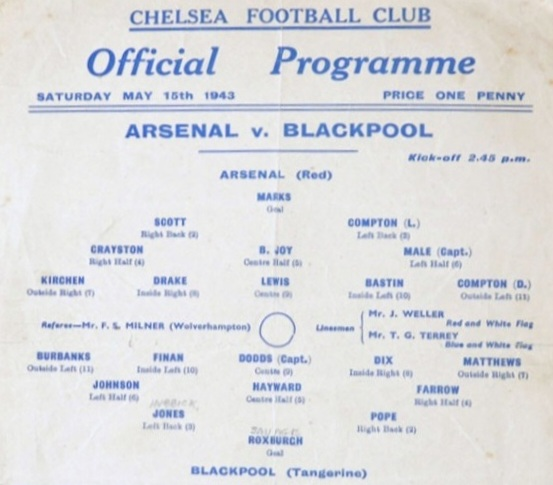
- Official programme
- Event: 1943 Football League War Cup
| Arsenal | Blackpool |
| 2 | 4 |
- Date: 15 May 1943
- Venue: Stamford Bridge, London
- Referee: F. S. Milner (Wolverhampton)
- Attendance: 55,195

The 1943 Football League War Cup final was an association football match contested by Arsenal and Blackpool. The match was held at Chelsea's home stadium Stamford Bridge on 15 May 1943, with Blackpool winning 4–2. According to British sportswriter Jon Henderson, it was "widely regarded as the greatest club match" of World War II.

== Events ==
=== Background ===
Arsenal became the first and only team to participate in two Football League War Cup finals after playing in the 1941 Football League War Cup final, losing 2–1 in playoffs by Preston North End. Blackpool were the favourites to win the 1942 Football League War Cup having defeated the eventual winners Wolverhampton Wanderers 6–1. They withdrew due to the news that military personnel had to stay on their bases during the Easter holidays as the team did not have time to find suitable replacements.

On 1 May 1943, Arsenal defeated Charlton Athletic 7–1 in the South final and on 8 May 1943, Blackpool defeated Sheffield Wednesday 2–1 in the North final.

Prior to the match, Burnley player Harry Hubbick replaced Sammy Jones as Blackpool's left back and Queen of the South player Willie Savage replaced Alec Roxburgh as their goalkeeper. Secretary of State for Dominion Affairs Clement Attlee and First Lord of the Admiralty A.V. Alexander were in attendance at the match.

=== Match and post-match ===
At five minutes played, Reg Lewis scored a 20 yard shot for Arsenal which, according to one report, "did everything but talk." Two minutes later, Arsenal player Denis Compton scored with an individual run. John Ross wrote in the Daily Mirror that "after seven minutes", he thought he "would need a cash register to tot up Arsenal's goals".

However, Ronnie Dix scored for Blackpool with a rising shot from 20 yards which Ross said "might have brought a plane down if the net hadn't been in the way". At the 75th minute, Blackpool equalised when Eddie Burbanks scored a low shot against George Marks. With Arsenal focusing their attention on right-winger Stanley Matthews, Burbanks on the other side set up goals in the closing minutes for Jock Dodds and Bobby Finan to see Blackpool defeat Arsenal 4-2.

In his biography of Stanley Matthews, journalist Jon Henderson wrote that the 1943 Football League War Cup Final "was widely regarded as the greatest club match of the war". The Daily Mirror put the combined market price of the Blackpool team at £70,000 which is over £2.5 million in today's money. Football chairman Will Cuff said in April 1944 that Blackpool had been the team of the season and the "epitome of good football" having a side who maintained a "fine football standard". Blackpool contested the 1944 North final against Aston Villa in which they won 2–1 in the first leg but were defeated in the second leg 4–2. Aston Villa having the higher aggregate score progressed to the final.

=== Match details ===
15 May 1943
14:45 BST

| Arsenal | 2–4 | Blackpool |
|---|---|---|
| Lewis 5'; Compton 7' | | Dix; Burbanks 75'; Dodds; Finan |

Stamford Bridge, London
Attendance: 55,195
Referee: F. S. Milner (Wolverhampton)

| Arsenal | Blackpool |

| GK | 1 | (England) George Marks |
| RB | 2 | (England) Laurie Scott |
| LB | 3 | (England) Leslie Compton |
| RH | 4 | (England) Jack Crayston |
| CH | 5 | (England) Bernard Joy |
| LH | 6 | (England) George Male (c) |
| OR | 7 | (England) Alf Kirchen |
| IR | 8 | (England) Ted Drake |
| CF | 9 | (England) Reg Lewis |
| IL | 10 | (England) Cliff Bastin |
| OL | 11 | (England) Denis Compton |
Manager:
(England) George Allison

| GK | 1 | (Scotland) Willie Savage |
| RB | 2 | (Scotland) Fred Pope |
| LB | 3 | (England) Harry Hubbick |
| RH | 4 | (England) George Farrow |
| CH | 5 | (England) Eric Hayward |
| LH | 6 | (England) Harry Johnston |
| OR | 7 | (England) Stanley Matthews |
| IR | 8 | (England) Ronnie Dix |
| CF | 9 | (Scotland) Jock Dodds (c) |
| IL | 10 | (Scotland) Bobby Finan |
| OL | 11 | (England) Eddie Burbanks |
Manager:
(England) Joe Smith

Assistant referees:
J. Weller
T. G. Terrey

== Sources ==
- Henderson, Jon (2 May 2013). The Wizard: The Life of Stanley Matthews. Random House. ISBN 9781448114351.
- Matthews, Stanley (12 December 2016). The Way It Was: My Autobiography. Canelo. ISBN 9781910859520.
