= George Farrow =

English footballer

Personal information
- Full name: George Henry Farrow
- Date of birth: 4 October 1913
- Place of birth: Whitburn, England
- Date of death: 1980 (aged 66–67)
- Height: 5 ft 10 in (1.78 m)
- Position: Defender

Senior career*
Years	Team	Apps	(Gls)
1931–1932	Stockport County	6	(0)
1932–1933	Wolverhampton Wanderers	11	(0)
1933–1936	Bournemouth & Boscombe Athletic	107	(12)
1936–1948	Blackpool	148	(15)
1948	Sheffield United	1	(0)
Total		273	(27)
- * Club domestic league appearances and goals

George Henry Farrow (4 October 1913 – 1980) was an English professional footballer. He played for six clubs in a seventeen-year professional career.

In the years before, during and after World War II, Blackpool were one of the most powerful teams in England, and the trio of George Farrow, Eric Hayward and Harry Johnston became legendary. Farrow's main assets were accurate long-range passes, penalty taking, strong tackling, and a fierce strike of the ball. He was also one of the earliest exponents of the long throw-in.

Born in Whitburn, South Tyneside, Farrow joined Bournemouth & Boscombe Athletic from Wolves in July 1933. Farrow impressed in the struggling third division side. In the 1934/35 season, Farrow was the club's top scorer with 11 league goals and 2 goals in the F.A cup. While at Bournemouth, he was the club's penalty taker.

Farrow moved north from Bournemouth in 1936, for a £1,250 fee, and made his debut for the Seasiders in September of that year, in a home win over West Ham United. He went on to make a further 32 league appearances in the 1936–37 campaign, scoring five goals. Initially an inside-left, he soon moved to wing-half, where his tackling was of more use. At the end of the season, Blackpool won promotion to Division One for only the second time in their existence. A nine-game win streak between 21 November and 1 January assisted the achievement.

In 1937–38, Farrow made thirty league appearances and scored another five goals, and the following season appeared in all but four of the club's league games. His only goal of the season was a penalty, Blackpool's second goal in a 2–1 victory at Sunderland on 17 September.

Wartime football intervened between August 1939 and May 1945, and when League football resumed in 1945–46, Farrow continued where he had left off, making 28 league appearances and scoring six goals.

Farrow missed the first eleven games of the 1946–47 campaign, but he went on to appear in 28 of the remaining 31. His one-goal came in his first appearance of the season, a 3–1 victory over Manchester United at Bloomfield Road on 19 October.

1947–48 proved to be Farrow's final season at the seaside. He made sixteen league appearances, scoring three goals, before being transferred to Sheffield United in the new year of 1948. He missed out on Blackpool's FA Cup run, which saw them reach that year's final, only to lose out to Manchester United at Wembley. His final appearance for Blackpool occurred on 3 January, a 5–0 home victory over Everton.

He finished his career with Bacup Borough and Whitburn St. Mary's.

Farrow died in 1980, and was survived by his wife and two children – a daughter, Julie, and a son, Tony.
