= Eric Hayward =

English footballer

Personal information
- Full name: Lionel Eric Hayward
- Date of birth: 2 August 1917
- Place of birth: Newcastle-under-Lyme, England
- Date of death: 1976 (aged 58–59)
- Place of death: Blackpool, England
- Height: 5 ft 11 in (1.80 m)
- Position: Defender

Youth career
- Hanley and Wardle's

Senior career*
Years	Team	Apps	(Gls)
1934–1937	Port Vale	35	(0)
1937–1952	Blackpool	269	(0)
Total		304	(0)
- * Club domestic league appearances and goals

Lionel Eric Hayward (2 August 1917 – 1976) was an English professional footballer who played as a defender. He was the elder brother of Basil and Doug Hayward.

He began his career as an amateur at Port Vale in July 1934 before turning professional in 1936. He was never a first-team regular and was allowed to join Blackpool in May 1937. He remained at Bloomfield Road for the next 15 years, during one of the brightest periods in the club's history, and played twice at Wembley in the FA Cup final defeats of 1948 and 1951. In total, he played 305 league games in the Football League, not including appearances during World War II.

== Career ==
Hayward began his career with Port Vale as an amateur in July 1934, signing professional forms two years later. He made his debut at the Old Recreation Ground in a 1–0 defeat to Bury on 30 March 1935, and made four appearances in 1934–35 and 13 appearances in 1935–36. He continued to skirt the fringes of the first-team as the "Valiants" were relegated from the Second Division into the Third Division North, featuring 21 times in 1936–37. He was transferred to Joe Smith's Blackpool in May 1937, with whom he would spend the next 15 years.

He made his debut for the "Seasiders" on 27 November 1937, in a single-goal defeat by Liverpool at Bloomfield Road. He went on to make 23 further appearances during the 1937–38 season. He missed only one game of the 1938–39 campaign before World War II intervened. During the hostilities he guested for Stoke City, Wolverhampton Wanderers, Wrexham, Walsall, Birmingham and Luton Town when he wasn't stationed with the Army in India. He also featured for Blackpool in the 1943 League War Cup final victory over Arsenal. When the Football League resumed in a regional form in 1945–46, Hayward returned to his club.

In 1946–47, Hayward made 20 appearances. In the following season, he missed only one game as Blackpool finished in the top ten in the First Division for a second consecutive season. He played in the 1948 FA Cup final at Wembley, which ended in a 4–2 defeat to Matt Busby's Manchester United. He was an ever-present in 1948–49.

Hayward appeared in the first third of the 1949–50 campaign before an injury ruled him out of the remaining 15 games. In 1950–51, Hayward made 37 league appearances as Blackpool finished third, their highest-ever finishing place in the League. Hayward also made his second appearance in an FA Cup final; again, they were unsuccessful, losing 2–0 to Newcastle United. Hayward missed out on Blackpool's third – this time successful – attempt at winning the FA Cup by twelve months. He retired at the end of the 1951–52 season after making almost 300 league and cup appearances at the club.

== Career statistics ==
Appearances and goals by club, season and competition
Club	Season	League			FA Cup		Other		Total	
Club	Season	Division	Apps	Goals	Apps	Goals	Apps	Goals	Apps	Goals
Port Vale	1934–35	Second Division	4	0	0	0	0	0	4	0
Port Vale	1935–36	Second Division	13	0	0	0	0	0	13	0
Port Vale	1936–37	Third Division North	18	0	1	0	2	0	21	0
Port Vale	Total		35	0	1	0	2	0	38	0
Blackpool	1937–38	First Division	24	0	2	0	0	0	26	0
Blackpool	1938–39	First Division	40	0	1	0	0	0	41	0
Blackpool	1939–40		0	0	0	0	3	0	3	0
Blackpool	1946–47	First Division	21	0	0	0	0	0	21	0
Blackpool	1947–48	First Division	41	0	6	0	0	0	47	0
Blackpool	1948–49	First Division	41	0	3	0	0	0	44	0
Blackpool	1949–50	First Division	26	0	4	0	0	0	30	0
Blackpool	1950–51	First Division	36	0	5	0	0	0	41	0
Blackpool	1951–52	First Division	40	0	1	0	0	0	41	0
Blackpool	Total		269	0	22	0	3	0	294	0
Career total			304	0	23	0	5	0	332	0

== Honours ==
Blackpool

- Football League War Cup: 1943
- FA Cup runner-up: 1947–48, 1950–51
