= John Crosland =

English footballer

Personal information
- Full name: John Ronald Crosland
- Date of birth: 10 November 1922
- Place of birth: Lytham St Annes, England
- Date of death: 6 May 2006 (aged 83)
- Position: Defender

Senior career*
Years	Team	Apps	(Gls)
–1946	Ansdell Rovers		
1946–1954	Blackpool	64	(0)
1954–1957	Bournemouth & Boscombe Athletic	106	(0)
1957–1961	Wisbech Town		

International career
1950	England "B"	2	(0)
- * Club domestic league appearances and goals

John Ronald Crosland DSC (10 November 1922 – 6 May 2006) was an English professional footballer, who played as a defender and could switch from centre-half to full-back.

Born in Lytham St Annes, Lancashire, Crosland was signed by Blackpool manager Joe Smith from Ansdell Rovers after being awarded the Distinguished Service Cross as a pilot in the Fleet Air Arm in World War II. After being unable to break into the first team due to the form of Ron Suart and Harry Johnston, he made his debut on 18 September 1946, in a defeat at Brentford. He played in the next three games, before sitting out the remaining seven months of the 1946–47 campaign.

He made only two league appearances in the 1947–48 season, but made his FA Cup debut in the 1948 FA Cup Final against Manchester United deputising for the injured Suart, and marking Reds winger Jimmy Delaney.

Crosland did not feature at all during the 1948–49 term, but made sixteen appearances in the 1949–50 season. After veteran centre-half Eric Hayward began to succumb to injuries, Crosland became more of a fixture in Smith's teams. In addition, the England selectors capped him at "B" level in 1950 before he was given regular first-team football during 1952–53.

A series of injuries curtailed his Blackpool career, and after 64 league appearances during eight years of service, he was sold to Bournemouth & Boscombe Athletic in 1954. He was selected to Captain the Third Division South representative side in 1954/55. He made just over one hundred league appearances for the South Coast club before finishing his career with Wisbech Town between 1957 and 1961.

== Personal life ==
Crosland was married to Peggy, and the couple opened a pub, the Old George, in Wisbech after Crosland's retirement. Stanley Matthews acted as a reference for them to the licensing authority. They were landlords until 1961 and later ran a hotel and taxi business. The Croslands, who celebrated their golden anniversary in January 2006, had three daughters, six grandchildren, and five great-grandchildren.

== Death ==
Crosland died on 6 May 2006 after collapsing. He was 83. His funeral was held at The Church of Michael the Archangel, in Huntingdon, where the couple had lived.

== Honours ==
Blackpool

- FA Cup runner-up: 1947–48
