= Jimmy McIntosh =

Scottish footballer and manager (1918–2000)

Personal information
- Full name: James McLauchlan McIntosh
- Date of birth: 5 April 1918
- Place of birth: Dumfries, Scotland
- Date of death: 4 April 2000 (aged 81)
- Place of death: Berwick-on-Tweed, England
- Height: 5 ft 10 in (1.78 m)
- Position: Forward

Senior career*
Years	Team	Apps	(Gls)
–1935	Droylsden		
1935–1937	Blackpool	5	(0)
1937–1946	Preston North End	27	(3)
1946–1948	Blackpool	66	(22)
1948–1951	Everton	58	(19)
1952–1955	Distillery		

Managerial career
- 1952–1955: Distillery (player-manager)
- 1955–1957: Glentoran
- 1957–1960: Greenock Morton
- 1960–1963: Berwick Rangers
- * Club domestic league appearances and goals

James McLaughlin McIntosh (5 April 1918 – 4 April 2000) was a Scottish professional footballer and manager. As a player McIntosh was a fast, strong, stocky forward.

== Blackpool (first spell) ==
McIntosh began his professional career with Joe Smith's Blackpool in 1935. At 17 years 169 days he became the then youngest player to appear in Blackpool's first team when he made his debut on 21 September 1935, in a single-goal defeat at Swansea Town. He made only three more appearances in the 1935–36 campaign; indeed, he wasn't selected again until the opening game of the 1936–37 season.

== Preston North End ==
In 1937 he joined Blackpool's arch-rivals Preston North End. He was part of a deal that brought Frank O'Donnell to the club, with Dickie Watmough joining McIntosh on his way to Deepdale. He made 27 league appearances and scored three goals.

== Blackpool (second spell) ==
After World War II (during which McIntosh turned out for Chester City), McIntosh returned to Blackpool, who were still under the management of Joe Smith. He appeared in the first 26 and final two games of the 1946–47 league season, scoring five goals in the process (including one in a 3–2 victory over that season's eventual champions, Liverpool, at Bloomfield Road on 30 November 1946).

In 1947–48, on 1 November 1947, he scored both goals in another home victory over Liverpool. He also scored the only goal in a home victory over Aston Villa on 31 January 1948 and five in a 7–0 victory at his former club Preston on 1 May.

After scoring five goals in the five ties (Tottenham were defeated 3–1 in the semi with Stan Mortensen netting all three) that led to the 1948 FA Cup final, McIntosh missed the 4–2 final defeat (after being ahead 2–1 at half time) against Manchester United. The following Monday the two sides played each other again, this time in a rearranged League fixture. Blackpool recalled McIntosh and won 1–0 courtesy of another Mortensen goal. The following Saturday, on League business, McIntosh scored five goals in a 7–0 whitewash of his former club Preston at Deepdale in the final game of the season. He had become the first Blackpool player to score five goals in one match.

In McIntosh's final season at Blackpool, 1948–49, he made just thirteen league appearances, scoring four goals. All of the goals game in three consecutive February league games (one against Bolton Wanderers, the only goal of the game; one at Liverpool in a 1–1 draw; and both goals in a 2–2 draw at home to Preston).

His final appearance for Blackpool occurred in the final game of the season, a 1–1 draw at Lancashire neighbours Burnley.

== Everton ==
McIntosh joined Everton, with whom he went on to make 58 league appearances and score nineteen goals. On 5 March 1949 he scored for the Toffees against ex club Blackpool in a 5–0 win at Goodison. Another of McIntosh's goals was on 28 April 1949 when he scored in the 2–0 home win v Manchester United.

== Distillery ==
McIntosh continued his career in Northern Ireland with then Belfast based Distillery as player/manager he led Distillery to the final of the Ulster Cup scoring eight goals in the competition before they were beat 3–0 in the final by Glentoran.

== Glentoran and after ==
McIntosh was installed as Manager of Glentoran, his first game in charge of the Belfast Glens an Irish League game on 16 April 1955 against Portadown, winning 4–2, he then followed this up with a 6–1 win over Derry City.

After a few seasons he moved back to Scotland to manage Greenock Morton.

McIntosh died in Berwick-on-Tweed on 4 April 2000, at the age of 81.
