= 1942–43 Chelsea F.C. season =

English football club season

Chelsea
1942–43 season
- Chairman: Joe Mears
- Manager: Billy Birrell
- Stadium: Stamford Bridge
- Football League South: 7th
- Football League South Cup: Group stage
Home colours	Away colours

The 1942–43 season was Chelsea Football Club's fourth season of wartime football during the Second World War. As the Football League and the FA Cup were suspended for the duration, the club instead competed in regional competitions. Records and statistics for these matches are considered unofficial. Due to the disruption of the war, the club often fielded guest players from other clubs. Chelsea finished 8th in the 18-team Football League South.
