= Tom Smith (footballer, born 1909) =

Scottish footballer and manager

Personal information
- Full name: Thomas McCall Smith
- Date of birth: 4 October 1909
- Place of birth: Fenwick, Scotland
- Date of death: 21 June 1998 (aged 88)
- Place of death: Preston, England
- Position: Centre half

Youth career
- Cumnock Juveniles
- Townhead Thistle

Senior career*
Years	Team	Apps	(Gls)
1927–1936	Kilmarnock	218	(1)
1928–1929	→ Galston (loan)		
1936–1945	Preston North End		

International career
1934–1938	Scotland	2	(0)
1936	Scottish League XI	1	(0)
1942	Scotland (wartime)	1	(0)
- * Club domestic league appearances and goals

Thomas McCall Smith (4 October 1909 – 21 June 1998) was a Scottish association football player and manager who played as a centre half for Kilmarnock, Preston North End and Scotland.

== Club career ==
=== Player ===
Smith, who was born in Fenwick, East Ayrshire, played in juvenile football before signing for Kilmarnock in late 1927. He was out on loan at non-league Galston when the club won the Scottish Cup in 1929, but was part of the Killie team that lost the 1932 final to Rangers after a replay.

A good performance for the Scottish Football League XI in a 1936 inter-league match against Football League XI attracted the interest of Preston North End, and Smith agreed to sign for the Lancashire club soon afterwards. He initially had to compete for the position with Billy Tremelling, and did not play in the 1937 FA Cup Final defeat by Sunderland. Smith played more regularly during the following season, when Preston finished third in the First Division. The club also had a significant cup run, culminating in the 1938 FA Cup Final win against Huddersfield, with Smith lifting the trophy as captain (he was one of seven Scots, including four from Ayrshire, in the Preston team).

The outbreak of the Second World War in September 1939 effectively curtailed Smith's playing career. He continued to play for Preston during the War, winning the Football League War Cup in 1941.

=== Manager ===
He returned to Kilmarnock in 1945 to serve as their manager – the club were struggling, having been mothballed during the conflict and its Rugby Park pitch requisitioned by the military. Smith took charge of the last wartime season in 1945–46 and the first on the resumption of regular competitions in 1946–47, which ended in relegation.

== International career ==
Smith first won international recognition while with Kilmarnock when he played for Scotland against England in the 1934 British Home Championship. He then took part in a Scottish Football Association tour of the US and Canada in the summer of 1935, but none of the fixtures counted as full internationals. To cap a highly successful year at with Preston, Smith made his second and last official appearance in the 1938 British Home Championship, a 1–0 victory over England; Three of his teammates at club level also played for Scotland in that match. He additionally played in one wartime international against England.

== Honours ==
Preston North End

- FA Cup: 1937–38
