= Alexander Munro =

Alexander Munro may refer to:

- Alexander Munro of Bearcrofts (died 1704), Scottish soldier and politician
- Alexander Munro (sculptor) (1825–1871), Pre-Raphaelite sculptor
- Alexander Munro (athlete) (1870–1934), British Olympic medal winner
- Alex Munro (comedian) (1911–1986), Scottish actor and comedian
- Alex Munro (footballer, born 1912) (1912–1986), Scottish footballer
- Alex Munro (footballer, born 1944) (1944–2009), Scottish footballer
- Alex Munro, a character in Star Trek: Voyager – Elite Force

== See also ==
- Alexander Monro (disambiguation)
