= Jimmy Blair (footballer, born 1918) =

Scottish footballer (1918–1983)

Personal information
- Full name: James Alfred Blair
- Date of birth: 6 January 1918
- Place of birth: Whiteinch, Scotland
- Date of death: 1983 (aged 64–65)
- Place of death: Llanelli, Wales
- Position: Forward

Senior career*
Years	Team	Apps	(Gls)
–1935	Cardiff City	0	(0)
1935–1947	Blackpool	50	(8)
1947–1949	Bournemouth & Boscombe Athletic	80	(8)
1949–1953	Leyton Orient	104	(26)
- Ramsgate Athletic
- Canterbury City
Total		234	(42)

International career
	Wales schoolboys	?	(?)
1946	Scotland	1	(0)

Managerial career
- Ramsgate Athletic (player-manager)
- * Club domestic league appearances and goals

James Alfred Blair (6 January 1918 – 1983) was a Scottish professional footballer. A forward, he was the son of Scottish international Jimmy Blair, Sr. and brother of Doug Blair.

== Career ==
Blair began his professional career with Cardiff City in the 1930s, but after failing to break into the Bluebirds first team, he was transferred to Joe Smith's Blackpool in June 1935. He made his debut for the Tangerines in the third league game of the 1937–38 season, in a single-goal victory over Everton at Bloomfield Road on 4 September 1937. His strike partner, Bobby Finan, scored the goal. Blair went on to make a further twenty appearances in the league that campaign, scoring four goals in the process: two in a 4–2 victory at Brentford on 16 September, one in a 4–2 defeat in the following game at home to Leicester City two days later, and one in a 2–1 victory at Portsmouth on 23 October.

In 1938–39, Blair managed just four league appearances as Joe Smith tried out several partners for Bobby Finan. In the first full season after World War II, 1946–47, Blair made twenty-five league appearances and scored four goals as Blackpool achieved a fifth-placed finish in Division One. One of his goals gave Blackpool both points against Chelsea at Bloomfield Road on 2 November 1946, while another helped them to a 3–2 victory over Liverpool, also at home, at the end of the month. Blair's final appearance for Blackpool occurred on 12 April 1947, in a 2–0 loss at home to Stoke City. It was his fiftieth league appearance for the club.

Blair joined Bournemouth & Boscombe Athletic in 1947, and in two years with the south-coast club he made eighty league appearances and scored eight goals.

In 1949, Blair joined Leyton Orient, with whom he made the most appearances and scored the most goals of his career: 104 league games and twenty-six goals. Blair's final two clubs were non-League outfits Ramsgate Athletic and Canterbury City.

== International career ==
Blair won one cap for Scotland, on 19 October 1946, in a 3–1 defeat to Wales. Blair had played for the Wales schoolboys team.

== Death ==
Blair died in 1983, at the age of 65.
