= Joe Robinson (footballer, born 1919) =

English footballer

Personal information
- Full name: Joseph Robinson
- Date of birth: 4 March 1919
- Place of birth: Morpeth, England
- Date of death: 12 July 1991 (aged 72)
- Position: Goalkeeper

Senior career*
Years	Team	Apps	(Gls)
19??–1947	Hartlepools United	?	(?)
1947–1948	Blackpool	25	(0)
1948–1953	Hull City	70	(0)

Managerial career
- 1953–1956: Wisbech Town (player-manager)
- * Club domestic league appearances and goals

Joseph Robinson (4 March 1919 – 12 July 1991) was an English football goalkeeper. He played for Blackpool in their appearance in the 1948 FA Cup Final against Manchester United.

== Playing career ==
=== Hartlepools United ===
Born in Morpeth, Northumberland, Robinson began his career at Third Division North side Hartlepools United.

=== Blackpool ===
Robinson joined First Division side Blackpool in 1947. After He made his Football League debut for them on 17 January 1948, in a 1–1 draw with Wolverhampton Wanderers at Molineux Stadium, replacing Jock Wallace for the second half of the 1947–48 season.

He kept four successive clean sheets in the club's FA Cup run that season, which took them to the final at Wembley, where they lost 4–2 to Manchester United. Robinson's appearance in the final came after only seventeen games for Blackpool.

Robinson played in the first eight League games of the 1948–49 campaign before being sold to Hull City. He had made a total of 25 League appearances for Blackpool, and was succeeded in the Seasiders' goal by George Farm.

=== Hull City ===
Robinson moved across the Pennines to join Hull City in 1948, helping them to win the Third Division North title, and with it promotion to the Second Division in the 1948–49 season.

In five years with the Tigers, he made seventy League appearances.

== Managerial career ==
Robinson had a brief career as a player-manager. He was in charge of non-League side Wisbech Town between 1953 and 1956.

== Post-retirement ==
=== Death ===
Robinson died on 12 July 1991, at the age of 72.

=== Theft ===
In January 2010, Robinson's FA Cup runners-up medal was stolen in a burglary from his son, Keith's house in Lower Withington, Cheshire.

== Honours ==
Blackpool

- FA Cup runner-up: 1947–48

Hull City

- Football League Third Division North: 1948–49
