= 1942–43 Blackpool F.C. season =

English football club season

Blackpool F.C.
1942–43 season
- Manager: Joe Smith
- League North: 1st (first competition); 13th (second competition)
- FA Cup: Competition suspended
- League War Cup: Winners (Northern Section)
- Top goalscorer: League: All: Jock Dodds (47)
Home colours

The 1942–43 season was Blackpool F.C.'s fourth season in special wartime football during World War II. They competed in League North, finishing first in the first competition and thirteenth in the second. Blackpool also won the League War Cup Northern Section, beating Sheffield Wednesday in the final. They also won the Challenge Cup, a meeting with the winners of the southern section of the League War Cup, Arsenal. Blackpool beat the Londoners 4–2 at Stamford Bridge in front of 55,195 spectators.

Jock Dodds was the club's top scorer for the fifth consecutive season, with 47 goals in all competitions.
