= Rex Adams =

English footballer

Personal information
- Full name: Rex Malcolm Adams
- Date of birth: 13 February 1928
- Place of birth: Oxford, England
- Date of death: 14 January 2014 (aged 85)
- Place of death: Blackpool, England
- Position: Winger

Senior career*
| Years | Team | Apps | (Gls) |
| –1948 | Oxford City | | |
| 1948–1951 | Blackpool | 16 | (1) |
| 1952–1953 | Worcester City | | |
| 1953–1954 | Oldham Athletic | 23 | (1) |
- * Club domestic league appearances and goals

Rex Malcolm Adams (13 February 1928 – 14 January 2014) was an English professional footballer who played as a winger. He played in the Football League with Blackpool and Oldham Athletic.

== Career ==
Adams was given a trial by Blackpool in April 1948 while on the books of Oxford City. He was signed for the Tangerines' 1948–49 campaign on 29 May, and was marked as being one of Stanley Matthews' understudies.

He made his League debut for Blackpool on 25 September 1948 as a deputy for Matthews, who was on international duty, in a single-goal victory over Liverpool at Bloomfield Road.

When Billy Wardle was injured later in the season, Adams had a four-game run at outside left and then, when Matthews was injured, at outside right for four games. It was in his first game in the latter position that he scored the only goal of the game in a victory over Portsmouth on 9 April 1949.

At the end of his maiden season, he had played nine League games.

It wasn't until 7 January, in the following 1948–49 season, that Adams returned to the first team as cover for the injured Wardle. He played four League games this season.

Due to a lack of first-team opportunities due to the presence of Stanley Matthews, coupled with the signing of Bill Perry, Adams requested a transfer in May 1950. The directors turned down the request. He initially refused the club's terms for the 1950–51 season, but eventually re-signed, on the eve of the campaign.

He had to wait until 14 April for his next League appearance. He played two other games that campaign, which proved to be his final ones for the club.

Adams joined non-League Worcester City in September 1952, before returning to the Football League when he signed for Second Division Oldham Athletic the following June.

He went on to play for Northwich Victoria, either side of a spell with Mossley, before retiring in the close season of 1957.

== Post-retirement ==
Adams became a salesman for the Manchester Evening News, but continued to live on Bloomfield Road, close to the football ground where he made his League debut.

== Personal life ==
Adams was married to Muriel. He had two children, Ken and Mark.

== Death ==
Adams died on 14 January 2014, aged 85.
