= Watmough =

Watmough is a surname. Notable people with the surname include:

- Anthony Watmough, Australian rugby league footballer
- Chris Watmough, English cricketer
- David Watmough, Canadian playwright, short story writer, and novelist
- Dickie Watmough, English footballer and cricketer
- John Goddard Watmough, American politician
