= Walter Rickett =

English footballer

Walter Rickett (20 March 1917 – 1991) was an English professional footballer who played as a winger for Sheffield United, Blackpool, Sheffield Wednesday, Rotherham United and Halifax Town.

== Blackpool ==
Rickett signed for Joe Smith's Blackpool during the 1947–48 season, making his debut on 14 February 1948, in a 3–1 victory over Grimsby Town at Bloomfield Road. He went on to make a further thirteen league appearances for the club that season, scoring twice (one in 2–1 defeat at Sheffield United and one in a 7–0 victory at Preston North End in the final game of the season). He also played in two FA Cup ties, including Blackpool's 4–2 defeat to Manchester United in the final.

== Honours ==
Blackpool

- FA Cup runner-up: 1947–48
