= Eric Sibley =

English footballer

Personal information
- Full name: Eric Seymour Sibley
- Date of birth: 17 November 1915
- Place of birth: Christchurch, Hampshire, England
- Date of death: 1996 (aged 80–81)
- Position: Defender

Youth career
- 1934–1937: Tottenham Hotspur

Senior career*
Years	Team	Apps	(Gls)
1937	Bournemouth	7	(0)
1937–1947	Blackpool	78	(0)
1947–1949	Grimsby Town	23	(0)
1949–1950	Chester	7	(0)
- * Club domestic league appearances and goals

Eric Seymour Sibley (17 November 1915 – 1996) was a professional footballer who played as a defender for Bournemouth, Blackpool, Grimsby Town and Chester.

== Playing career ==
=== Blackpool ===
Sibley joined Blackpool from Bournemouth during the second half of the 1937–38 season, and made his debut on 29 January in a single-goal victory at Leicester City. He went on to appear in the remaining fifteen games of the campaign.

The following season, 1938–39, Sibley started 29 of Blackpool's 42 league games, before World War II intervened. In 1945–46, Sibley made six guest appearances for Southampton.

After the conclusion of the war, in 1945–46, Sibley made six appearances for Blackpool in the Football League North.

In Sibley's final season at Bloomfield Road, 1946–47, he made 37 league appearances, as well as making his debut for the Tangerines in the FA Cup. His final game for the club occurred on 7 April, a 3–0 home defeat by Everton. He was sold to Grimsby Town.

=== Grimsby Town ===
In two years at Blundell Park, Sibley made 23 league appearances.

=== Chester ===
Sibley finished his professional career with Chester in 1950 after seven league appearances for the club. He left to become player-manager at a Lytham St Annes-based club.
