= Willie Buchan =

Scottish footballer and manager

Personal information
- Full name: William Ralston Murray Buchan
- Date of birth: 17 October 1914
- Place of birth: Grangemouth, Scotland
- Date of death: 6 July 2003 (aged 88)
- Place of death: Polmont, Scotland
- Position: Inside forward

Youth career
- Cowie Thistle Juveniles
- –1933: Grange Rovers

Senior career*
Years	Team	Apps	(Gls)
1933–1937	Celtic	123	(50)
1937–1948	Blackpool	100	(35)
1948–1949	Hull City	40	(12)
1949–1952	Gateshead	88	(16)
1953–1954	Coleraine	?	(?)
1955–1956	East Stirlingshire	10	(0)

International career
1935–1937	Scottish League XI	2	(3)
1943	Scotland (wartime)	1	(0)

Managerial career
- 1953–1954: Coleraine (player-manager)
- * Club domestic league appearances and goals

William Ralston Murray Buchan (17 October 1914 – 6 July 2003) was a Scottish professional football player and manager. He played for Celtic, Blackpool, Hull City, Gateshead, Coleraine and East Stirlingshire.

Buchan signed professional forms with Celtic in 1933 and spent four years with the Glasgow club, winning the Scottish League Division One championship with them in 1935–36 and the Scottish Cup in 1937.

In 1937, Buchan signed for Joe Smith's Blackpool for £10,000, then a record transfer fee involving a Scottish club, making his debut on 20 November 1937 in a 2–0 defeat at local rivals Preston North End. He scored his first goals for the club two games later, in a 2–2 draw at Middlesbrough on 4 December. He went on to score ten more goals in the 23 remaining games of the league season and, with his total twelve goals, finished joint-top scorer with Bobby Finan (see Blackpool F.C. season 1937–38).

The following season, 1938–39, he finished joint-top scorer again, this time with new signing Jock Dodds, the pair scoring ten goals apiece. During the first of six seasons of inter-war football that followed, Buchan returned to Glasgow in an attempt to re-join Celtic, but the club showed little enthusiasm. He instead joined his local team, Stenhousemuir, as a guest player. When the club closed down for the duration of the war, Buchan returned to England to become a PT instructor in the Royal Air Force. Buchan made one appearance for Scotland in a wartime international.

At the end of the war, Buchan returned to Blackpool. In Buchan's final season at the seaside, 1947–48, he made fourteen appearances in a start-stop season, his place in the line-up restricted due to the form of Stan Mortensen, Stanley Matthews and Ernie Taylor. His four goals game in two games: two in a 2–2 draw with Wolves on 6 September 1947, and two (one a penalty) in a 3–1 victory over Charlton Athletic at Bloomfield Road on 29 November. His final appearance for the club occurred on 1 May 1948, the final day of the league season, in a 7–0 demolition of Preston North End at Deepdale.

Buchan joined Hull for the start of the 1948–49 campaign. In his only season with the club, he made forty league appearances, scoring twelve goals.

In 1949, he joined Gateshead, with whom he made 88 league appearances and scored 16 goals. After a short spell as player-manager of Northern Irish club Coleraine, Buchan finished his career in his native Scotland with East Stirlingshire.

Buchan died on 6 July 2003, aged 88.

== Honours ==
Celtic

- Scottish League championship: 1935–36
- Scottish Cup winner: 1936–37

Hull City

- Football League Third Division North championship: 1948–49
