= 1942–43 Arsenal F.C. season =

English football club season

Arsenal
1942–43 season
- Chairman: Robin Vane-Tempest-Stewart, 8th Marquess of Londonderry
- Manager: George Allison
- Football League South: 1st
- Football League South Cup: Winners
- Football League War Cup: Finalists
Home colours

The 1942–43 season was Arsenal Football Club's fourth season playing wartime football during World War II. They won the Football League South and the Football League South Cup. Arsenal were finalists in the Football League War Cup.

== Background ==
Arsenal played their home games at White Hart Lane, as Highbury had been transformed to support Air Raid Precautions.

After participating in the rebel London War League for the 1941-42 season, the Football League allowed the London clubs to rejoin their system. After the rebel clubs wrote formal apology letters and fines, the League South was created for the new season.

Arsenal won the Football League South and the League South Cup. In the League South Cup final, Arsenal faced Charlton whom they beat 7-1 at Wembley. Reg Lewis, a prolific wartime scorer with 142 goals in 128 wartime appearances, scored 4 goals in that final. Lewis scored 53 goals in all competitions during the 1942-43 season, boosting the club's attendance numbers.

Arsenal faced Blackpool in the finals of the Football League War Cup, a matchup which now pitted the winners of the League South and League North Cups against each other at Stamford Bridge. Blackpool won 4-2, making Arsenal the only team to reach two War Cup finals and lose.

== Results ==
Arsenal's score comes first

=== Legend ===
Win	Draw	Loss

=== Football League South ===
Selected results from the league.

Date	Opponent	Venue	Result	Attendance	Scorers
29 August 1942	Charlton Athletic	A	6–2		
5 September 1942	Southampton	H	6–1		
12 September 1942	Millwall	A	2–1		
19 September 1942	Luton Town	H	2–0		
26 September 1942	Portsmouth	A	2–2		
3 October 1942	Fulham	A	4–3		
10 October 1942	Clapton Orient	A	4–1		
17 October 1942	Brentford	H	0–2	16,700	
24 October 1942	Reading	H	4–1		
31 October 1942	Crystal Palace	A	7–1		
7 November 1942	Tottenham Hotspur	A	0–1		
14 November 1942	Queen's Park Rangers	H	3–0		
21 November 1942	Aldershot	A	7–4		
28 November 1942	Charlton Athletic	H	3–0		
5 December 1942	Southampton	A	3–1		
12 December 1942	Millwall	H	?–?		
19 December 1942	Luton Town	A	?–?		
25 December 1942	Chelsea	A	2–5		
26 December 1942	Chelsea	H	1–5		
2 January 1943	Portsmouth	H	?–?		
9 January 1943	Fulham	H	?–?		
16 January 1943	Clapton Orient	H	?–?		
23 January 1943	Brentford	A	1–0		
30 January 1943	Reading	A	?–?		
6 February 1943	Crystal Palace	H	?–?		
13 February 1943	Tottenham Hotspur	H	?–?		
20 February 1943	Queen's Park Rangers	A	?–?		
27 February 1943	Aldershot	H	?–?		

==== Final League table ====
Pos	Team	Pld	W	D	L	GF	GA	GR	Pts
1	Arsenal	28	21	1	6	102	40	2.550	43
2	Tottenham Hotspur	28	16	6	6	68	28	2.429	38
3	Queen's Park Rangers	28	18	2	8	64	49	1.306	38
4	Portsmouth	28	16	3	9	66	52	1.269	35
5	Southampton	28	14	5	9	86	58	1.483	33
6	West Ham United	28	14	5	9	80	66	1.212	33
7	Chelsea	28	14	4	10	52	45	1.156	32
8	Aldershot	28	14	2	12	87	77	1.130	30
9	Brentford	28	12	5	11	64	63	1.016	29
10	Charlton Athletic	28	13	3	12	68	75	0.907	29
11	Clapton Orient	28	11	5	12	54	72	0.750	27
12	Brighton & Hove Albion	28	10	5	13	64	72	0.889	25
13	Reading	28	9	6	13	67	74	0.905	24
14	Fulham	28	10	2	16	69	78	0.885	22
15	Crystal Palace	28	7	5	16	49	75	0.653	19
16	Millwall	28	6	5	17	66	88	0.750	17
17	Watford	28	7	2	19	51	88	0.580	16
18	Luton Town	30	6	4	20	47	114	0.412	16

Source: https://www.rsssf.org/tablese/eng43.html

=== Football League South Cup ===
Round	Date	Opponent	Venue	Result	Attendance	Goalscorers
GS	6 March 1943	Brighton & Hove Albion	A	5–1		
GS	13 March 1943	Watford	H	4–1		
GS	20 March 1943	West Ham United	A	3–1		
GS	27 March 1943	Brighton & Hove Albion	H	5–0		
GS	3 April 1943	Watford	A	1–1		
GS	10 April 1943	West Ham United	H	3–1		
SF	24 April 1943	Queen's Park Rangers	N	4–1		
F	1 May 1943	Charlton Athletic	N	7–1	75,000	

=== Football League War Cup ===
The winners of the Football League South Cup and the Football League North Cup faced each other in the Football League War Cup.

Round	Date	Opponent	Venue	Result	Attendance	Goalscorers
F	15 May 1943	Blackpool	N	2–4	55,195
