= Eddie Shimwell =

English footballer (1920–1988)

Personal information
- Full name: Edmund Shimwell
- Date of birth: 27 February 1920
- Place of birth: Birchover, England
- Date of death: 30 September 1988 (aged 68)
- Position: Defender

Youth career
- 19??–1939: Wirksworth

Senior career*
Years	Team	Apps	(Gls)
1939–1946	Sheffield United	14	(0)
1946–1957	Blackpool	283	(5)
1957–1958	Oldham Athletic	7	(0)
1958–1959	Burton Albion	?	(?)
1959–1960	Matlock Town	?	(?)
Total		304	(5)

International career
1949	England	1	(0)

Managerial career
- Burton Albion (player-manager)
- * Club domestic league appearances and goals

Edmund Shimwell (27 February 1920 – 30 September 1988) was an English professional footballer.

== Playing career ==
Born in Birchover, Derbyshire, Shimwell was a trainee with Sheffield United in 1939, but failed to break into the first team before the outbreak of World War II. In 1943–44, he made 15 guest appearances for Southampton.

Shimwell began his professional career with Sheffield United in 1946, but on 20 December he made the move to the club with which he made his name, Blackpool. The Blades had refused Shimwell permission to run a pub — the Plough Inn, in Two Dales — which prompted him to put in a transfer request. Blackpool manager Joe Smith jumped in to sign the full-back for £7,000.

His debut for Blackpool was supposed to be against Charlton Athletic, the day after his signing, but it was put back after his train got stuck in snow, which meant he did not arrive at The Valley until half-time. His first game came four days later, on Christmas Day, against Blackburn Rovers at Ewood Park. He replaced Eric Sibley, and from that moment he made the right-back position his own.

Shimwell scored two important FA Cup goals for Blackpool; the first, against Chester City on 24 January 1948, was a 60-yard lob, the combination of a following wind and frozen pitch saw it bounce over the goalkeeper's head. Blackpool reached that year's final, in which they met eventual victors Manchester United, and Shimwell became the first full-back to score in such a Wembley event when his 12th-minute penalty gave Blackpool the lead.

Shimwell played in two more FA Cup Finals with Blackpool, firstly in 1951 against Newcastle United (in which they were on the losing side again, thanks to a Jackie Milburn double), and then in 1953, the famous "Matthews Final" Blackpool victory.

On 13 May 1949, at the age of 29, Shimwell gained his only England cap, against Sweden.

A dislocated shoulder, suffered in a win over Wolverhampton Wanderers at Bloomfield Road on 17 September 1955, meant Shimwell was out for the rest of the season. Indeed, he made only one more start for the Seasiders, on 19 January 1957, at home to Sunderland, but it gave the Blackpool faithful amongst the 18,702 present the chance to say farewell to the defender after thirteen years of service. In May, Shimwell was given a free transfer to Third Division Oldham Athletic. He played only seven games for the club before joining Burton Albion as player-manager. He finished his playing career while at Matlock Town in 1960.

== Retirement ==
After retiring, Shimwell became licensee at The Royal Volunteer, a pub in Clay Cross, Derbyshire. He was also the licensee of the Plough Inn, Two Dales, and later of the Duke of Wellington, Matlock.

Shimwell died in 1988 at the age of 68.

== Honours ==
Blackpool

- FA Cup: 1952–53; runner-up: 1947–48, 1950–51
- Lancashire Cup: 1954
