= John Anderson (footballer, born 1921) =

English footballer

Personal information
- Date of birth: 11 October 1921
- Place of birth: Salford, Lancashire, England
- Date of death: 8 August 2006 (aged 84)
- Height: 1.68 m (5 ft 6 in)
- Position: Winger

Senior career*
Years	Team	Apps	(Gls)
1946–1949	Manchester United	33	(1)
1949–1951	Nottingham Forest	40	(1)
1952–1955	Peterborough United	83	(4)
- * Club domestic league appearances and goals

John Anderson (11 October 1921 – 8 August 2006) was an English football player, whose career started in 1946.

Anderson was born in Salford, Lancashire. He played as a midfielder for Manchester United, and helped the club win the FA Cup in 1948 with a goal against Blackpool in the final, a match that is still widely regarded as one of the finest games ever played at Wembley Stadium. Manchester United won 4–2 and this was the first of Stanley Matthews' three cup final appearances for Blackpool. Anderson was transferred to Nottingham Forest in October 1949 before transferring to Peterborough United, where upon retiring from playing professional football he was recruited to Posh's backroom staff as trainer/coach. His firstborn son John Anderson and family still live in Peterborough although his other siblings all relocated in Manchester.

He died in August 2006, at age 84.

== Honours ==
=== As a player ===
Manchester United

- FA Cup: 1947–48
