= Ricky Thomson =

Scottish footballer (born 1957)

Personal information
- Full name: Richard Blair Thomson
- Date of birth: 26 June 1957 (age 69)
- Place of birth: Edinburgh, Scotland
- Position: Forward

Senior career*
Years	Team	Apps	(Gls)
1975–1979	Preston North End	71	(11)
- * Club domestic league appearances and goals

Richard Blair Thomson (born 26 June 1957) is a Scottish former professional footballer played as a forward for Preston North End.

== Early life ==
Thomson was born in Edinburgh, Scotland, on 26 June 1957.

== Career ==
Preston North End was Thomson's only club. He joined the Lilywhites as an apprentice, and went on to make 71 Football League appearances for the club, scoring 11 goals.

On 4 August 1979, Preston and arch-rivals Blackpool met at Deepdale in the Anglo-Scottish Cup. With the hosts leading 3–1 in the final minute, Blackpool goalkeeper Tom McAlister saved Thomson's penalty, tipping the ball onto the bar. It bounced down over the line, but by then the referee, Ashley, had blown his whistle to signal the end of the game. The goal did not count, but the spectators went home in the belief that the scoreline was 3–2. The official explained to Thomson and McAlister that the moment the ball had stopped travelling forwards the game was over and ruled it had ended the moment McAlister touched the ball.
