= George Marks (footballer, born 1915) =

English footballer

Personal information
- Full name: William George Marks
- Date of birth: 9 April 1915
- Place of birth: Figheldean, Wiltshire, England
- Date of death: 22 January 1998 (aged 82)
- Place of death: Salisbury, Wiltshire, England
- Position: Goalkeeper

Youth career
- Salisbury Corinthians

Senior career*
Years	Team	Apps	(Gls)
1936–1946	Arsenal	2	(0)
1936–1938	→ Margate (loan)		
1946–1948	Blackburn Rovers	67	(0)
1948	Bristol City	9	(0)
1948–1953	Reading	118	(0)

International career
1941–1943	England (wartime)	8	(0)
- * Club domestic league appearances and goals

William George Marks (9 April 1915 – 22 January 1998) was an English association football player, who played as a goalkeeper.

Born in Figheldean, Wiltshire, Marks started his career at local club Salisbury Corinthians before joining Arsenal as an amateur in March 1936; he turned professional two months later. Marks spent two years on loan at Arsenal's nursery club Margate before returning in May 1938. He played twice for Arsenal before the outbreak of war, but served mainly as understudy to George Swindin and Alex Wilson; however he did play the final two games of the 1938-39 season, his debut coming against Derby County on 29 April 1939. His second and final league appearance in goal for Arsenal was memorable, as it was their 2–0 win over Brentford at Highbury, a match recorded on film for the movie The Arsenal Stadium Mystery.

Official football was suspended during the war; Marks served in the Royal Air Force in Northern Ireland, but still found time to play 129 wartime matches for Arsenal and win one Football League War Cup and two Football League South medals, as well as eight wartime caps for England. Once war was over and football resumed, Marks was deemed too old for Arsenal and sold for £5,000 in August 1946 to Blackburn Rovers - at the time a record fee for a keeper. Despite spending ten years with Arsenal, thanks to the war Marks had only two official League appearances to his name.

He spent two seasons with Rovers, his career there punctuated by a period out with a jaw injury. He moved to Bristol City in August 1948, but stayed only two months before signing for Reading. There he spent five years before retiring as a player. He went on to be a coach with Reading for two years before quitting the game entirely, and becoming a local government officer in his native Wiltshire. He died in 1998, aged 82.
