= 1942–43 in English football =

Football in England
- Season: 1942–43

Men's football
- Football League: not held
- FA Cup: not held

The 1942–43 season was the fourth season of special wartime football in England during the Second World War.

== Overview ==
Between 1939 and 1946 normal competitive football was suspended in England. Many footballers signed up to fight in the war and as a result many teams were depleted, and fielded guest players instead. The Football League and FA Cup were suspended and in their place regional league competitions were set up. Appearances in these tournaments do not count in players' official records.

== Honours ==
League competition was split into three regional leagues, North, South and West.

Competition	Winner
League South	Arsenal
League West	Lovell's Athletic
League North	Blackpool (First Championship); Liverpool (Second Championship)
League North Cup	Manchester City
Football League War Cup	Blackpool (Northern Section); Arsenal (Southern Section); Blackpool beat Arsenal 4–2 in a playoff.
Lancashire War Cup	Manchester United

== See also ==
- England national football team results (unofficial matches)
