= Doug Hayward (footballer) =

English footballer

Personal information
- Date of birth: 23 August 1920
- Place of birth: Oakengates, England
- Date of death: 31 August 2008 (aged 88)
- Place of death: Weston-super-Mare, Somerset, England
- Position: Full-back

Senior career*
Years	Team	Apps	(Gls)
1939–1946	Huddersfield Town	0	(0)
1946	Bristol Rovers	1	(0)
1946–1956	Newport County	260	(11)
- Bath City
Total		261	(11)
- * Club domestic league appearances and goals

Doug Hayward (23 August 1920 – 31 August 2008) was an English professional footballer. He was born in Wellington St. George's. A full back, Hayward began his career with Huddersfield Town in 1939 before joining Bristol Rovers in 1946 but he only played once for Rovers. In 1946 he joined Newport County and went on to make 260 appearances for the club, scoring 11 goals. In 1956 he joined Bath City. He was brother to Basil and Eric Hayward.
