= Alexander Monro =

Alexander Monro may refer to:

- Alexander Monro (educator), Principal of the University of Edinburgh, 1685–1690
- Alexander Monro (primus) (1697–1767), Scottish physician, founder of Edinburgh Medical School
- Alexander Monro (secundus) (1733–1817), son of previous, Scottish physician and medical educator
- Alexander Monro (tertius) (1773–1859), son of previous, Scottish physician, Professor of anatomy

== See also ==
- Alexander Munro (disambiguation)
- Monro Family (Physicians)
