= Jock Wallace Sr. =

Scottish footballer

Jock Wallace

Personal information
- Full name: John Martin Wallace
- Date of birth: 13 April 1911
- Place of birth: Deantown, Scotland
- Date of death: 5 September 1978 (aged 67)
- Place of death: Wallyford, Scotland
- Height: 6 ft 0 in (1.83 m)
- Position: Goalkeeper

Youth career
- Wallyford Bluebell

Senior career*
Years	Team	Apps	(Gls)
1931–1934	Raith Rovers	107	(0)
1934–1948	Blackpool	243	(0)
1948	Derby County	16	(0)
1948	Leith Athletic		
- * Club domestic league appearances and goals

John Martin Wallace (13 April 1911 – 5 September 1978) was a Scottish professional football goalkeeper.

He began his senior career at Raith Rovers, before moving south of the border in March 1934 to join compatriot Sandy MacFarlane's Blackpool. He made his debut at Lincoln City on 17 February 1934 and became almost an ever-present, remaining at the club for fourteen years and notching up 243 league appearances for the Tangerines. During the Second World War, he appeared as a guest player for Dumbarton in the unofficial competitions of the time.

On more than one occasion, the Scot fell out with the Blackpool board or management, and on one occasion he refused to join the team to play Leeds United in the FA Cup. He was replaced by his understudy, Joe Robinson. Wallace's argument was over contractual terms, and he eventually joined Derby County for a nominal £500 fee in February 1948. The Rams had a goalkeeping crisis, and Wallace, who was not cup-tied, played in the FA Cup sixth round and semi-finals. Derby were knocked out, and it was Blackpool who went on to Wembley from the other semi-final.

His job done, Wallace left Derby for Leith Athletic in August 1948, returning to his hometown of Edinburgh, where he had guested for Leith's rivals St Bernard's during the war.

His son, Jock Wallace Jr., also played as a goalkeeper and managed Rangers, Leicester City and Sevilla. Wallace Sr died in 1978 at the age of 67.
