= Alex Munro (footballer, born 1944) =

Scottish footballer

Personal information
- Full name: Alexander Munro
- Date of birth: 3 October 1944
- Place of birth: Glasgow, Scotland
- Date of death: 24 May 2009 (aged 64)
- Place of death: St Austell, England
- Height: 5 ft 9 1/2 in (1.77 m)
- Positions: Outside left; left back

Youth career
- Drumchapel Juniors

Senior career*
Years	Team	Apps	(Gls)
1962–1971	Bristol Rovers	168	(11)
1971–1974	Durban City		
1975–1977	East London United		
- * Club domestic league appearances and goals

Alexander Munro (3 October 1944 – 24 May 2009) was a Scottish footballer who spent his career playing in England and South Africa. The son of former Scotland international Alex Munro, Munro Jr. represented Glasgow Schoolboys as a child before joining Bristol Rovers as a seventeen-year-old, following a successful trial.

Munro initially played as a left half, but was soon moved to outside left where he was a regular between 1966 and 1968. Later in his career he was converted to a left back, a position where he broke his leg in the Gloucestershire Cup final in May 1968, but after a year he had recovered sufficiently to play in the position regularly until he was replaced by Lindsay Parsons in 1970.

Following the loss of his position at Bristol Rovers, Munro moved to South Africa in 1971, when he joined Durban City. He went on to play for Durham City and East London, both also in South Africa, before retiring from football. He remained in the country until 2007, when he moved back to England to live in Cornwall, dying in St Austell on 24 May 2009.
