= Dickie Watmough =

English footballer and cricketer

Personal information
- Full name: Richard Watmough
- Date of birth: 1912
- Place of birth: Sheffield, England
- Date of death: 7 September 1962 (aged 49–50)
- Height: 5 ft 4 in (1.63 m)
- Position: Midfielder

Senior career*
| Years | Team | Apps | (Gls) |
| –1934 | Bradford City | 94 | (24) |
| 1934–1937 | Blackpool | 100 | (31) |
| 1937–1938 | Preston North End | 20 | (4) |
| Total | | 214 | (59) |
- * Club domestic league appearances and goals

Richard Watmough (1912 – 7 September 1962) was an English professional footballer and cricketer. He played as a midfielder in the former sport.

== Football ==
Born in Sheffield (then the West Riding of Yorkshire) but brought up in Idle, Bradford, West Yorkshire, Watmough signed for his hometown club in the early 1930s. He went on to make almost one hundred league appearances for the Bantams, scoring 24 goals.

In 1934, he signed for Blackpool. He made his debut for the club on 13 October 1934, ten games into the 1934–35 season, and scored the winning goal in Blackpool's 2–1 victory over Norwich City at Bloomfield Road. He went on to make a further 31 league appearances and score another eight goals.

The following season, 1935–36, under new manager Joe Smith, he made 23 league appearances and scored eight goals. He also scored twice in Blackpool's short FA Cup campaign, netting two goals in a 3–1 victory over Margate in the third round (the round in which they entered the competition).

In 1936–37, Watmough scored thirteen goals in his 31 league appearances, helping the club to a runners-up finishing position and promotion to Division One.

In their first season back in the top flight, 1937–38, Watmough's place came under pressure from Alex Munro, who was signed from Hearts. Watmough made fourteen league appearances and scored two goals before he was sold to arch-rivals Preston North End in early December 1937, in an exchange deal that brought Frank O'Donnell to Blackpool and also took Jim McIntosh to Deepdale. Watmough's final game for Blackpool was in a single-goal defeat at home to Liverpool on 27 November.

At Preston, he won the FA Cup in 1938, at the end of his only season with the club.

== Cricket ==
Watmough played for Yorkshire County Cricket Club's Second XI in the 1932 Minor Counties Cricket Championship and was once twelfth man for the First XI.

== Post-retirement ==
After retiring, Watmough became a publican in his hometown of Idle with his wife Ruth Watmough (née Farrar [1912-2012]) and scouted for Bradford Park Avenue.

He died on 7 September 1962.

== Honours ==
Blackpool

- Football League Second Division promotion: 1936–37

Preston North End

- FA Cup: 1937–38
