= 1950–51 Blackpool F.C. season =

English football club season

Blackpool F.C.
1950–51 season
- Manager: Joe Smith
- Division One: 3rd
- FA Cup: Final
- Top goalscorer: League: Stan Mortensen (30); All: Stan Mortensen (35)
Home colours

The 1950–51 season was Blackpool F.C.'s 43rd season (40th consecutive) in the Football League. They competed in the 22-team Division One, then the top tier of English football, finishing third.

The club also appeared in their second FA Cup Final in four seasons; however, as on the first occasion, they lost, this time to Newcastle United (see 1951 FA Cup Final), who finished one place behind them in the league.

Stan Mortensen was the club's top scorer for the seventh consecutive season, with 35 goals (30 in the league and five in the FA Cup).

== Table ==
Pos	Team	Pld	W	D	L	GF	GA	GAv	Pts
1	Tottenham Hotspur (C)	42	25	10	7	82	44	1.864	60
2	Manchester United	42	24	8	10	74	40	1.850	56
3	Blackpool	42	20	10	12	79	53	1.491	50
4	Newcastle United	42	18	13	11	62	53	1.170	49
5	Arsenal	42	19	9	14	73	56	1.304	47

Source: World Football
Rules for classification: 1) Points; 2) Goal average; 3) Goals scored
(C) Champions
