= 1948 FA Cup final =

1948 FA Cup Final
- Event: 1947–48 FA Cup
Manchester United	Blackpool
4	2
- Date: 24 April 1948
- Venue: Wembley Stadium, London
- Referee: Jack Barrick (Little Billing)
- Attendance: 99,842

The 1948 FA Cup final was contested by Manchester United and Blackpool at Wembley Stadium on 24 April 1948. United, who had not appeared in an FA Cup Final for 39 years, won 4–2, with two goals from Jack Rowley and one apiece from Stan Pearson and John Anderson. Eddie Shimwell and Stan Mortensen scored Blackpool's goals. With his goal, Shimwell became the first full-back to score in a Wembley cup final. Blackpool manager Joe Smith decided not to select Jimmy McIntosh for the final despite McIntosh having scored five goals in the five ties leading up to the final. The two sides met in a rearranged league fixture the Monday after the Wembley final. McIntosh was selected to play for Blackpool, who won 1–0 with McIntosh scoring the winner.

The previous month it was announced that Blackpool would not be wearing their traditional tangerine-and-white strip due to its clashing with United's red. Instead, they wore white shirts with black shorts, but would be allowed to wear their normal socks, even though they too came under the auspices of the colour-clash ban. The FA also instructed United to wear blue shirts and white shorts, meaning both teams played in change strip.

Hugh Kelly was the last surviving Blackpool player from the game when he died in March 2009 at the age of 85. The last surviving player from the game was Manchester United goalkeeper Jack Crompton who died in July 2013 at the age of 91.

== Match details ==
24 April 1948

Manchester United	4–2	Blackpool
Rowley 28', 70'; Pearson 80'; Anderson 82'	Report	Shimwell 12' (pen.); Mortensen 35'

Wembley Stadium, London
Attendance: 99,842
Referee: C. J. Barrick (Northamptonshire)

Manchester United	Blackpool

GK	1	(England) Jack Crompton
RB	2	(Republic of Ireland) Johnny Carey (c)
LB	3	(England) John Aston
RH	4	(England) John Anderson
CH	5	(England) Allenby Chilton
LH	6	(England) Henry Cockburn
OR	7	(Scotland) Jimmy Delaney
IR	8	(England) Johnny Morris
CF	9	(England) Jack Rowley
IL	10	(England) Stan Pearson
OL	11	(England) Charlie Mitten
Manager:
(Scotland) Matt Busby

GK	1	(England) Joe Robinson
RB	2	(England) Eddie Shimwell
LB	3	(England) John Crosland
RH	4	(England) Harry Johnston (c)
CH	5	(England) Eric Hayward
LH	6	(Scotland) Hugh Kelly
OR	7	(England) Stanley Matthews
IR	8	(Scotland) Alex Munro
CF	9	(England) Stan Mortensen
IL	10	(Scotland) George Dick
OL	11	(England) Walter Rickett
Manager:
(England) Joe Smith
