= 1941 Football League War Cup final =

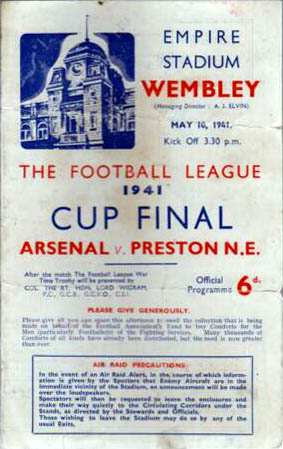
- Event: 1941 Football League War Cup
Preston North End	Arsenal
1	1
- Date: 4 May 1941
- Venue: Wembley Stadium, London

Playoff
- Event: 1941 Football League War Cup
Preston North End	Arsenal
2	1
- Date: 31 May 1941
- Venue: Ewood Park, Blackburn

The 1941 Football League War Cup final was contested by Arsenal and Preston North End. The first tie, played at Wembley Stadium on 4 May 1941, was drawn 1–1, McLaren scoring for Preston before Denis Compton equalised for Arsenal.

The replay took place three weeks later, on 31 May 1941, at Ewood Park. Preston took the lead through Bobby Beattie, but Arsenal equalised late in the game courtesy of an own goal by Frank Gallimore. Within thirty seconds, Beattie had scored again for Preston, to secure the victory 2–1.

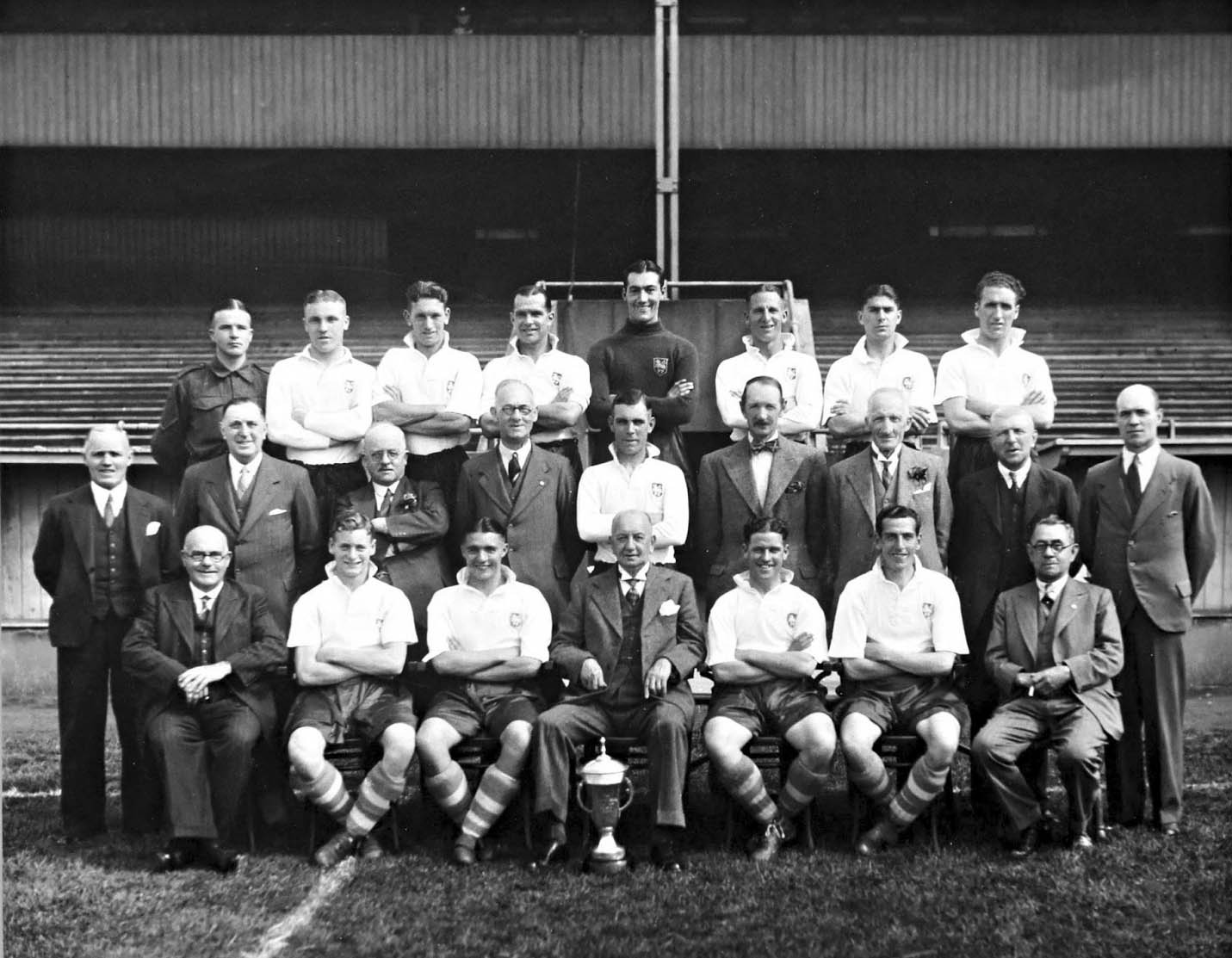
Preston North End, champions

== Match details ==
=== Final ===
4 May 1941
Final

Preston North End	1–1	Arsenal
McLaren		Compton

Wembley Stadium, London

=== Replay ===
31 May 1941
Replay

Preston North End	2–1	Arsenal
Beattie		Gallimore

Ewood Park, Blackburn

Preston North End
Arsenal
