= 1945–46 Blackpool F.C. season =

English football club season

Blackpool F.C.
1945–46 season
- Manager: Joe Smith
- Football League North: 9th
- FA Cup: Fourth round
- Top goalscorer: League: Stan Mortensen (34); All: Stan Mortensen (38)
Home colours

The 1945–46 season was Blackpool F.C.'s first season of post-World War II football. They competed in the 22-team Football League North, a stop-gap competition introduced between the end of inter-war football and the recommencement of the Football League proper the following season, finishing ninth. The statistics from this season are not included in official publications.

Blackpool won 18 games, drew 9 and lost 15 of their league games.

Stan Mortensen was the club's top scorer for the second consecutive season, with 38 goals (34 in the league and four in the FA Cup).

== League table ==
Pos	Team	Pld	W	D	L	GF	GA	GR	Pts
7	Chesterfield	42	17	12	13	68	49	1.388	46
8	Barnsley	42	17	11	14	76	68	1.118	45
9	Blackpool	42	18	9	15	94	92	1.022	45
10	Manchester City	42	20	4	18	78	75	1.040	44
11	Liverpool	42	17	9	16	80	70	1.143	43

Source: rsssf.com
