= Bobby Finan =

Scottish footballer

Personal information
- Full name: Robert Joseph Finan
- Date of birth: 1 March 1912
- Place of birth: Old Kilpatrick, Scotland
- Date of death: 25 July 1983 (aged 71)
- Place of death: Old Kilpatrick, Scotland
- Height: 5 ft 6 1/2 in (1.69 m)
- Position: Forward

Senior career*
Years	Team	Apps	(Gls)
–1933	Yoker Athletic		
1933–1947	Blackpool	173	(85)
1947–1949	Crewe Alexandra	59	(14)
1949–1950	Wigan Athletic	31	(12)
Total		263	(111)

International career
1939	Scotland (wartime)	1	(0)
- * Club domestic league appearances and goals

Robert Joseph Finan (1 March 1912 – 25 July 1983) was a Scottish professional footballer. He played as a forward.

== Club career ==
Finan was born in Old Kilpatrick in West Dunbartonshire. He started his career at Scottish junior club Yoker Athletic before signing for Blackpool, managed by fellow Scot Sandy MacFarlane, in 1933. He made his debut for the club in the penultimate league game of the 1933–34 season, a 7–0 defeat at Grimsby Town on 28 April 1934. He went on to score three more goals during that league campaign.

Finan scored his first professional goal in the opening game of the following 1934–35 campaign, a 5–1 victory at Bury on 25 August 1934.

In 1935–36, with Jimmy Hampson injured, Finan deputised at centre-forward and ended the season as the Second Division's joint-top scorer with 34 goals. He scored two hat-tricks: the first in a 6–2 win against Charlton Athletic at Bloomfield Road on 22 February 1936, and the second in a 6–0 whitewash of Newcastle United at home on 22 April.

The following campaign, 1936–37, Finan (28) and Hampson (16) scored 44 league goals between them, as Blackpool finished the season as runners-up in the Football League Second Division and were promoted to the Football League First Division. As he grew older, his speed began to wane, and he was moved to outside-left, where he laid on goals for Willie Buchan and, later, Jock Dodds.

Finan scored 85 league goals for Blackpool before finally leaving the club in 1947, when he signed for Crewe Alexandra, scoring 14 goals in 59 games. In 1949 he moved to non-League football with Wigan Athletic, with whom he finished his career in 1950 having scored 12 goals in 31 games in the Lancashire Combination.

After his playing career ended, Finan returned to Blackpool as chief scout.

== International career ==
Finan won one cap for Scotland in a wartime international, during the early stages of World War II. As the conflict progressed, he went on to serve in the Middle East and was a regular in the RAF (Egypt) side, once severely injuring his knee in a Cairo Canal-area match at El Alamein.
