= Stan Mortensen =

English footballer (1921–1991)

Personal information
- Full name: Stanley Harding Mortensen
- Date of birth: 26 May 1921
- Place of birth: South Shields, County Durham, England
- Date of death: 22 May 1991 (aged 69)
- Position: Centre forward

Senior career*
Years	Team	Apps	(Gls)
1941–1955	Blackpool	317	(197)
1955–1957	Hull City	42	(18)
1957–1958	Southport	36	(10)
1958–1959	Bath City	45	(27)
1960–1962	Lancaster City		
Total		440	(252)

International career
1947–1953	England	25	(23)

Managerial career
- 1967–1969: Blackpool
- * Club domestic league appearances and goals

Stanley Harding Mortensen (26 May 1921 – 22 May 1991) was an English professional footballer, notable for his part in the 1953 FA Cup final (subsequently known as the "Matthews Final"), in which he became the only player ever to score a hat-trick in a Wembley FA Cup Final. He was also both the first player to score for England in a FIFA World Cup qualifying campaign and the first England player to score in the tournament proper.

== Wartime career ==
South Shields-born Mortensen went to war in 1939 as a teenage wireless operator and overcame an injury—sustained when his RAF bomber crashed, leaving him as the only survivor—to be signed by Blackpool in 1941. While stationed at RAF Lossiemouth in Scotland, he scored 13 times in 12 unofficial matches for Aberdeen, also turning out as a guest for Arsenal with a scoring record of 25 goals in 19 appearances.

During the war, he scored dozens of goals before making a strange piece of history by switching teams to play for Wales when they needed a reserve during a game against England on 25 September 1943. Wales' Ivor Powell was injured and had to leave the field and, as England's reserve, Mortensen took his place in the Welsh side. Wales lost 8–3, and Stanley Matthews later wrote of the game: "Nobody in the 80,000 crowd had any idea that Mortensen was going to change. When, a quarter of an hour later, the player in the red jersey returned to the field, a cheer went up from the crowd, who — not knowing the seriousness of Powell's injury — were under the impression the injured Welsh wing half was returning. Even when "Powell" went to inside-left, the onlookers did not suspect anything unusual, as team switches are often necessary after a player has been injured. Even some of the England players did not know that Mortensen was playing on the other side, and the football reporters, whose headquarters at Wembley are at the top of the main stand, did not know of the change until after half-time."

== Post-war club career ==
In a playing career spent mostly with Blackpool, Mortensen scored 197 league goals in 317 games. His 197 goals for Blackpool, all in the top flight, ranks him as the 33rd-highest goalscorer in history. He is the second-highest top scorer for Blackpool, behind Jimmy Hampson.

Mortensen holds the record of scoring in the most consecutive league matches, with 15. Another record he still holds today is that he scored in twelve consecutive rounds of the FA Cup, including the defeat in the 1948 FA Cup Final. In the FA Cup semi-final of 1947–48, Tottenham Hotspur were leading 1–0 with four minutes remaining when Mortensen equalised from a cross from Stanley Matthews. Mortensen scored two more goals in extra-time as Blackpool reached the final of the FA Cup for the first time. Mortensen had scored in every round thus far, seven goals in total. In the final, Blackpool took an early lead from a penalty against Manchester United before Jack Rowley equalised. Mortensen scored before half time to make it 2–1, becoming the first player in history to score in every round of the FA Cup in one season. Rowley scored again in the second half, before two goals in the last ten minutes secured a 4–2 win for United.

Blackpool were back at Wembley for the 1951 FA Cup final. Mortensen had scored five goals during the competition, but could not add to his tally as Blackpool suffered disappointment again. A second-half brace from Jackie Milburn secured a 2–0 win for Newcastle United.

It was third time lucky for Mortensen and Blackpool as they reached their third final in five years in the 1952–53 season. Mortensen wrote himself into the record books, although the final is commonly referred to as the "Matthews Final". A 2–1 victory against Tottenham took them to their third Wembley final, with Bolton Wanderers their opponents. Nat Lofthouse gave Bolton a second-minute lead, before a Mortensen shot was deflected in for the equaliser. Bolton eventually led 3–1, before Matthews set up Mortensen who made it 3–2. With two minutes, remaining Mortensen scored a twenty-yard free kick to bring the scores level at 3–3, becoming the first player to score a hat-trick in a FA Cup final at Wembley. In injury time, Bill Perry converted a Matthews cross to seal a 4–3 win for Blackpool.

Mortensen's hat-trick became a fact retrospectively: his first goal was widely considered an own goal by Harold Hassell at the time. Kenneth Wolstenholme, the BBC commentator, attributed the goal to Hassell, as did the Sunday newspapers the following morning. In the book The Great English Final, author David Tossell states that only since the publication of the FA Yearbook two months later, which awarded Mortensen with all three goals, that the hat-trick became accepted as fact. In the Charity Shield match at Highbury against Arsenal, Mortensen put the FA Cup winners ahead. However, Tommy Lawton, and a brace from Doug Lishman, resulted in a 3–1 for Arsenal.

The 1950–51 league season saw Mortensen break the record of scoring in the most consecutive matches, a record set by Irishman Jimmy Dunne twenty years earlier. Although missing two games through injury during the span, Mortensen scored in 15-consecutive matches before a blank, but scored again for 16 goals in 17 matches. He scored 25 goals in 22 games from December as he finished that season with 30 league goals. He was top scorer every season during his time at the club. He started his tenth season with the club before being transferred to Second Division Hull City. After joining Southport, Mortensen announced his retirement from playing on 24 April 1958, at the age of 37. "I have been having trouble with my knee and have had several injections," he said, after deciding against renewing his contract. "Making the decision was not easy." Despite the announcement, he went on to play for non-League clubs Bath City and Lancaster City.

== International career ==
Mortensen won his first international cap for England in a friendly international against Portugal on 25 May 1947. He scored four goals as England won 10–0. His first competitive match came in October, a British home championship match against Wales at Ninian Park. He was on target as England won 3–0. In a friendly the following month against Sweden he hit a hat-trick in a 4–2 win at Highbury. He scored another hat-trick, this time in a 1948 British home championship match as England beat Ireland 6–2 at Windsor Park, Belfast.

On 25 June 1950, Mortensen scored England's first goal at a World Cup tournament, as England beat Chile 2–0 at the Maracana Stadium in Rio de Janeiro, Brazil.

Mortensen won his last international cap for England against Hungary on 25 November 1953. In a fixture dubbed Match of the Century, England lost their long unbeaten home record against foreign opposition. The score was 6–3, with Mortensen scoring before half-time after England went 4–1 down.

Mortensen scored 23 goals in 25 appearances, but a series of knee injuries restricted his appearances. He was also eligible to play for Norway, due to his grandfather Hans, who emigrated to South Shields.

== Post-retirement ==
After retiring, Mortensen returned to Blackpool as manager between 1967 and 1969, when he was sacked. He also auctioned his football medals in order to help Blackpool through a tough spell.

On 20 October 1983, at the Blackpool supporters' annual general meeting, Mortensen was voted vice-president.

On 18 November 1989, Mortensen led the Blackpool team out onto the Bloomfield Road pitch for their FA Cup first-round tie with Bolton Wanderers. Former Bolton Wanderers forward Nat Lofthouse, who faced Mortensen and Blackpool in the 1953 FA Cup Final, led the visitors out.

Twelve days later, on 30 November, a tribute dinner for Mortensen was held at Blackpool's Savoy Hotel. Attended by many former Blackpool players, the event was arranged to honour Morty's fifty years of service to both Blackpool Football Club and the town.

== Death and legacy ==
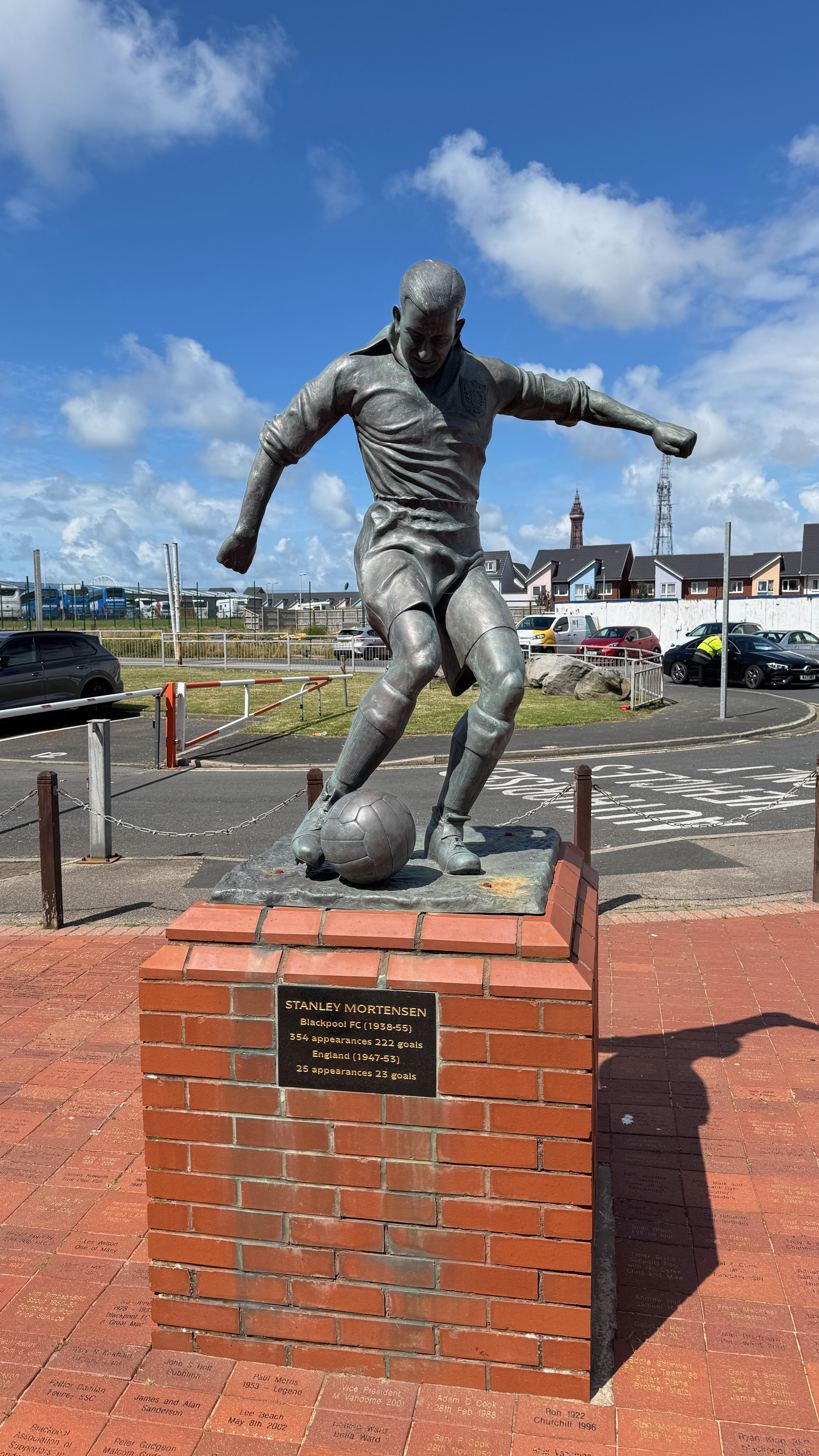
Statue outside Bloomfield Road

Mortensen died, aged 69, on 22 May 1991, the day Blackpool reached Wembley for the first time since 1953. They had beaten Scunthorpe United 3–2 on aggregate to reach the Fourth Division play-off final. A minute's silence was held before the final against Torquay United.

On his death, it was said, "They'll probably call it the Matthews funeral," in reference to Mortensen's overshadowing by Stanley Matthews after the 1953 FA Cup final. His funeral was held at St John's parish church, Blackpool, and he was cremated at Carleton Crematorium in Carleton, Lancashire.

The month of May became associated with much of his life. During May, he was born, signed professionally, made his England debut, won the FA Cup, and died.

Mortensen is mentioned with admiration in the song "1966 and All That" on the 1986 vinyl EP The Trumpton Riots (incorporated into the 2003 CD re-release of the 1985 album Back in the DHSS) by the indie band Half Man Half Biscuit, who call him "The Tangerine Wizard" (Note: Blackpool F.C. are nicknamed "The Tangerines".) and "The Jesus Christ of Bloomfield Road".

In 2003, Mortensen was posthumously inducted into the English Football Hall of Fame in recognition of his talent and achievements.

On 23 August 2005, a statue of Mortensen was unveiled by his widow, Jean, and former Blackpool teammate Jimmy Armfield in front of Bloomfield Road's new North Stand, which now bears his name. "Of all the honours that Stan won in football, he would think this was top of the league. He was so very proud of playing for Blackpool and loved everything about the town. Nothing was ever too much trouble for him when the club or town came knocking. For him to be remembered in a statue, he would think it was the creme de la creme. A massive thank-you has to go to the generous people of Blackpool, who have dug deep to raise money for this. Stan would have been really proud." Jean Mortensen died in July 2009 at the age of 88.

In the 2005 film The Game of Their Lives he is portrayed by Gavin Rossdale, of Bush fame. The BBC notes that some viewers may be amused by the fact that "Mortensen – a working class Geordie – [is] portrayed [in the film] as [a] sneering toff," suggesting that the American film stereotyped English players in a "wooden and clichéd" manner.

== Blackpool F.C. Hall of Fame ==
Mortensen was inducted into the Hall of Fame at Bloomfield Road, when it was officially opened by Jimmy Armfield in April 2006. Organised by the Blackpool Supporters Association, Blackpool fans around the world voted on their all-time heroes. Five players from each decade are inducted; Mortensen is in the 1950s.

== Career statistics ==
=== Club ===
Appearances and goals by club, season and competition
Club	Season	Division	League		FA Cup		Other		Total	
Club	Season	Division	Apps	Goals	Apps	Goals	Apps	Goals	Apps	Goals
Blackpool	1945–46	—	—		5	4	0	0	5	4
Blackpool	1946–47	First Division	38	28	1	1	0	0	39	29
Blackpool	1947–48	First Division	34	21	6	10	0	0	40	31
Blackpool	1948–49	First Division	34	18	3	2	0	0	37	20
Blackpool	1949–50	First Division	37	22	5	3	0	0	42	25
Blackpool	1950–51	First Division	35	30	8	5	0	0	43	35
Blackpool	1951–52	First Division	35	26	1	0	0	0	36	26
Blackpool	1952–53	First Division	34	15	2	3	0	0	36	18
Blackpool	1953–54	First Division	31	21	2	1	1 (Note: Appearance in FA Charity Shield)	1	34	23
Blackpool	1954–55	First Division	28	11	1	0	0	0	29	11
Blackpool	1955–56	First Division	11	5	0	0	0	0	11	5
Blackpool	Total		317	197	34	29	1	1	352	227
Hull City	1955–56	Second Division	21	8	2	0	0	0	23	8
Hull City	1956–57	Third Division	21	10	2	2	0	0	23	12
Hull City	Total		42	18	4	2	0	0	46	20
Southport	1956–57	Third Division	11	5	0	0	0	0	11	5
Southport	1957–58	Third Division	25	5	1	0	0	0	26	5
Southport	Total		36	10	1	0	0	0	37	10
Bath City	1958–59	Southern League	45	27	?	?	?	?	45	27
Career total			440	252	39	31	1	1	480	284

=== International ===
Appearances and goals by national team and year
National team	Year	Apps	Goals
England	1947	5	9
England	1948	4	5
England	1949	6	3
England	1950	6	3
England	1951	2	1
England	1952	0	0
England	1953	2	2
Total		25	23

Scores and results list England's goal tally first, score column indicates score after each Mortensen goal.

Stats taken from England national football team results (1930–59).

List of international goals scored by Stan Mortensen
No.	Date	Venue	Opponent	Cap	Score	Result	Competition
1	25 May 1947	Estádio Nacional, Lisbon, Portugal	Portugal	1	2–0	10–0	Friendly
2	25 May 1947	Estádio Nacional, Lisbon, Portugal	Portugal	1	6–0	10–0	Friendly
3	25 May 1947	Estádio Nacional, Lisbon, Portugal	Portugal	1	8–0	10–0	Friendly
4	25 May 1947	Estádio Nacional, Lisbon, Portugal	Portugal	1	9–0	10–0	Friendly
5	21 September 1947	Heysel Stadium, Brussels, Belgium	Belgium	2	2–0	5–2	Friendly
6	18 October 1947	Ninian Park, Cardiff, Wales	Wales	3	2–0	3–0	1948 British Home Championship
7	9 November 1947	Highbury, London, England	Sweden	5	1–0	4–2	Friendly
8	9 November 1947	Highbury, London, England	Sweden	5	3–1	4–2	Friendly
9	9 November 1947	Highbury, London, England	Sweden	5	4–2	4–2	Friendly
10	10 April 1948	Hampden Park, Glasgow, Scotland	Scotland	6	2–0	2–0	1948 British Home Championship
11	16 May 1948	Stadio Comunale, Turin, Italy	Italy	7	1–0	4–0	Friendly
12	9 October 1948	Windsor Park, Belfast, Northern Ireland	Ireland	8	2–1	6–2	1949 British Home Championship
13	9 October 1948	Windsor Park, Belfast, Northern Ireland	Ireland	8	4–1	6–2	1949 British Home Championship
14	9 October 1948	Windsor Park, Belfast, Northern Ireland	Ireland	8	5–1	6–2	1949 British Home Championship
15	15 October 1949	Ninian Park, Cardiff, Wales	Wales	13	1–0	4–1	1950 British Home Championship; 1950 FIFA World Cup qualification - Group 1
16	6 November 1949	Maine Road, Manchester, England	Ireland	14	4–0	9–2	1950 British Home Championship; 1950 FIFA World Cup qualification - Group 1
17	6 November 1949	Maine Road, Manchester, England	Ireland	14	6–0	9–2	1950 British Home Championship; 1950 FIFA World Cup qualification - Group 1
18	14 May 1950	National Stadium, Lisbon, Portugal	Portugal	17	2–0	5–3	Friendly
19	18 May 1950	Heysel Stadium, Brussels, Belgium	Belgium	18	2–1	4–1	Friendly
20	25 June 1950	Maracanã, Rio de Janeiro, Brazil	Chile	19	1–0	2–0	1950 FIFA World Cup - Group 2
21	9 May 1951	Wembley Stadium, London, England	Argentina	23	1–1	2–1	Friendly
22	21 November 1953	Wembley Stadium, London, England	The Rest of Europe	24	1–1	4–4	Friendly
23	25 November 1953	Wembley Stadium, London, England	Hungary	25	2–4	3–6	Friendly

=== Managerial statistics ===
Managerial record by team and tenure
Team	From	To	Record				
Team	From	To	P	W	D	L	Win %
Blackpool	1 February 1967	1 April 1969	105	43	27	35	41.0
Total			105	43	27	35	41.0

== Honours ==
Blackpool

- FA Cup: 1952–53; runner-up: 1947–48, 1950–51

== See also ==
- List of English football first tier top scorers
- List of footballers in England by number of league goals
- List of men's footballers with 500 or more goals
