= Alex Munro (footballer, born 1912) =

Scottish footballer (1912–1986)

Personal information
- Full name: Alexander Dewar Munro
- Date of birth: 6 April 1912
- Place of birth: Carriden, Bo'ness, Scotland
- Date of death: 29 August 1986 (aged 74)
- Place of death: Blackpool, England
- Positions: Winger; forward

Senior career*
| Years | Team | Apps | (Gls) |
- Bo'ness
- Champfleurie
- Newtongrange Star
| 1932–1936 | Hearts | 18+ | (21) |
| 1936–1950 | Blackpool | 136 | (17) |

International career
| 1936–1938 | Scotland | 3 | (1) |
- * Club domestic league appearances and goals

Alexander Dewar Munro (6 April 1912 – 29 August 1986) was a Scottish professional footballer.

== Club career ==
Born in the West Lothian village of Carriden, Bo'ness, Munro began his career with Bo'ness F.C., before reverting to junior football with Champfleurie and Newtongrange Star. He returned to league football when signed by Hearts in April 1932 and had gradually worked his way into the first team by 1934, appearing mainly as a left-winger. He switched to the right flank from 1934–35 and that season helped Hearts to the Scottish Cup semi-finals, playing in both games as Double-winning Rangers proved too strong in a replay at Hampden Park.

Munro joined Blackpool in March 1937 for £3,500. He went on to spend thirteen years with the Tangerines, making 136 league appearances and scoring seventeen goals for them. This total would have been considerably greater but for the disruption of the Second World War, during which time he "guested" for Middlesbrough and Brighton and Hove Albion.

Upon his playing retirement in 1950 Munro joined the Blackpool coaching staff. He was later to serve the club as a scout.

Munro's son, also called Alex Munro, was also a professional footballer, playing in England and South Africa.

== International career ==
Munro won three caps for Scotland (the first two during his Hearts days; the other while with Blackpool) and scored one goal, against Ireland on 31 October 1936.

== Honours ==
Blackpool

- FA Cup runner-up: 1947–48
