= 1938–39 Blackpool F.C. season =

English football club season

Blackpool F.C.
1938–39 season
- Manager: Joe Smith
- Division One: 15th
- FA Cup: Third round
- Top goalscorer: League: Willie Buchan & Jock Dodds (10 each); All: Willie Buchan & Jock Dodds (10 each)
Home colours

The 1938–39 season was Blackpool F.C.'s 38th season (35th consecutive) in the Football League. They competed in the 22-team Division One, then the top tier of English football, finishing fifteenth.

Willie Buchan was the club's top scorer for the second consecutive season, this time jointly with Jock Dodds, with ten goals each in all competitions.

== Table ==
Pos	Team	Pld	W	D	L	GF	GA	GAv	Pts
13	Leeds United	42	16	9	17	59	67	0.881	41
14	Manchester United	42	11	16	15	57	65	0.877	38
15	Blackpool	42	12	14	16	56	68	0.824	38
16	Sunderland	42	13	12	17	54	67	0.806	38
17	Portsmouth	42	12	13	17	47	70	0.671	37

Source: World Football
Rules for classification: 1) Points; 2) Goal average; 3) Goals scored
