= 1947–48 FA Cup =

Tournament details
- Country: England; Wales

Final positions
- Champions: Manchester United (2nd title)
- Runners-up: Blackpool

The 1947–48 FA Cup was the 67th staging of the world's oldest football cup competition, the Football Association Challenge Cup, commonly known as the FA Cup. Manchester United won the competition for only the second time, beating Blackpool 4–2 in the final at Wembley.

Matches were scheduled to be played at the stadium of the team named first on the date specified for each round, which was always a Saturday. Some matches, however, might be rescheduled for other days if there were clashes with games for other competitions or the weather was inclement. If scores were level after 90 minutes had been played, a replay would take place at the stadium of the second-named team later the same week. If the replayed match was drawn further replays would be held until a winner was determined. If scores were level after 90 minutes had been played in a replay, a 30-minute period of extra time would be played.

== Calendar ==
Round	Date
Extra preliminary round	Saturday 6 September 1947
Preliminary round	Saturday 20 September 1947
First qualifying round	Saturday 4 October 1947
Second qualifying round	Saturday 18 October 1947
Third qualifying round	Saturday 1 November 1947
Fourth qualifying round	Saturday 15 November 1947
First round proper	Saturday 29 November 1947
Second round	Saturday 13 December 1947
Third round	Saturday 10 January 1948
Fourth round	Saturday 24 January 1948
Fifth round	Saturday 7 February 1948
Sixth round	Saturday 28 February 1948
Semifinals	Saturday 13 March 1948
Final	Saturday 24 April 1948

== Qualifying rounds ==
Most participating clubs that were not members of the Football League competed in the qualifying rounds to secure one of 25 places available in the first round.

The 25 winners from the fourth qualifying round were Bishop Auckland, Stockton, South Shields, Workington, Lancaster City, Marine, Runcorn, Stalybridge Celtic, Bromsgrove Rovers, Shrewsbury Town, Scunthorpe & Lindsey United, Grantham, Vauxhall Motors (Luton), Colchester United, Great Yarmouth Town, Banbury Spencer, Gillingham, Bromley, Horsham, Dartford, Guildford City, Trowbridge Town, Cheltenham Town, Merthyr Tydfil and Street.

Those appearing in the competition proper for the first time were Bromsgrove Rovers, Vauxhall Motors (Luton), Great Yarmouth Town, Banbury Spencer, Horsham and the re-formed South Shields. Bromsgrove's surprise qualification marked the first time the club had progressed past the preliminary round since 1921–22.

Banbury Spencer was the only club to progress from the extra preliminary round to the competition proper, defeating Oxford City, Osberton Radiator, the team from the Cowley-based Metal & Produce Recovery Depot, Maidenhead United, Southall and Grays Athletic before losing to Colchester United in that club's historic run to the fifth round.

== First round proper ==
At this stage 41 clubs from the Football League Third Division North and South joined the 25 non-league clubs that came through the qualifying rounds. Rotherham United, Queens Park Rangers and Swansea Town were given byes to the third round. To make the number of matches up, non-league Leytonstone and Wimbledon, the previous season's F. A. Amateur Cup winners and runners-up, were given byes to this round.

34 matches were scheduled to be played on Saturday, 29 November 1947. Six were drawn and went to replays.

Tie no	Home team	Score	Away team	Date
1	Chester	3–1	Bishop Auckland	29 November 1947
2	Dartford	0–0	Bristol City	29 November 1947
Replay	Bristol City	9–2	Dartford	6 December 1947
3	Bournemouth & Boscombe Athletic	2–0	Guildford City	29 November 1947
4	Barrow	3–2	Carlisle United	29 November 1947
5	Watford	1–1	Torquay United	29 November 1947
Replay	Torquay United	3–0	Watford	6 December 1947
6	Gillingham	1–0	Leyton Orient	29 November 1947
7	Notts County	9–1	Horsham	29 November 1947
8	Crewe Alexandra	4–1	South Shields	29 November 1947
9	Lincoln City	0–2	Workington	29 November 1947
10	Swindon Town	4–2	Ipswich Town	29 November 1947
11	Stockton	2–1	Grantham	29 November 1947
12	Wrexham	5–0	Halifax Town	29 November 1947
13	Tranmere Rovers	2–0	Stalybridge Celtic	29 November 1947
14	Stockport County	3–1	Accrington Stanley	29 November 1947
15	Trowbridge Town	1–1	Brighton & Hove Albion	29 November 1947
Replay	Brighton & Hove Albion	5–0	Trowbridge Town	6 December 1947
16	Bristol Rovers	3–2	Leytonstone	29 November 1947
17	Bromley	3–3	Reading	29 November 1947
Replay	Reading	3–0	Bromley	6 December 1947
18	Great Yarmouth Town	1–4	Shrewsbury Town	29 November 1947
19	Norwich City	3–0	Merthyr Tydfil	29 November 1947
20	Hull City	1–1	Southport	29 November 1947
Replay	Southport	2–3	Hull City	6 December 1947
21	Oldham Athletic	6–0	Lancaster City	29 November 1947
22	Crystal Palace	2–1	Port Vale	29 November 1947
23	Wimbledon	0–1	Mansfield Town	29 November 1947
24	Exeter City	1–1	Northampton Town	29 November 1947
Replay	Northampton Town	2–0	Exeter City	6 December 1947
25	Hartlepools United	1–0	Darlington	29 November 1947
26	Newport County	3–2	Southend United	29 November 1947
27	Cheltenham Town	5–0	Street	29 November 1947
28	Runcorn	4–2	Scunthorpe & Lindsey United	29 November 1947
29	Vauxhall Motors (Luton)	1–2	Walsall	29 November 1947
30	New Brighton	4–0	Marine	29 November 1947
31	York City	0–1	Rochdale	29 November 1947
32	Aldershot	2–1	Bromsgrove Rovers	29 November 1947
33	Gateshead	1–3	Bradford City	29 November 1947
34	Colchester United	2–1	Banbury Spencer	29 November 1947

== Second round proper ==
The matches were played on Saturday, 13 December 1947. Seven matches were drawn, with replays taking place the following Saturday. One of these then went to a second replay.

Tie no	Home team	Score	Away team	Date
1	Bournemouth & Boscombe Athletic	1–0	Bradford City	13 December 1947
2	Bristol City	0–1	Crystal Palace	13 December 1947
3	Rochdale	1–1	Gillingham	13 December 1947
Replay	Gillingham	3–0	Rochdale	20 December 1947
4	Reading	3–0	Newport County	13 December 1947
5	Notts County	1–1	Stockton	13 December 1947
Replay	Stockton	1–4	Notts County	20 December 1947
6	Tranmere Rovers	0–1	Chester	13 December 1947
7	Stockport County	1–1	Shrewsbury Town	13 December 1947
Replay	Shrewsbury Town	2–2	Stockport County	20 December 1947
Replay	Stockport County	3–2	Shrewsbury Town	22 December 1947
8	Bristol Rovers	4–0	New Brighton	13 December 1947
9	Northampton Town	1–1	Torquay United	13 December 1947
Replay	Torquay United	2–0	Northampton Town	20 December 1947
10	Norwich City	2–2	Walsall	13 December 1947
Replay	Walsall	3–2	Norwich City	20 December 1947
11	Hull City	4–2	Cheltenham Town	13 December 1947
12	Oldham Athletic	0–1	Mansfield Town	13 December 1947
13	Hartlepools United	1–1	Brighton & Hove Albion	13 December 1947
Replay	Brighton & Hove Albion	2–1	Hartlepools United	20 December 1947
14	Runcorn	0–1	Barrow	13 December 1947
15	Workington	1–2	Crewe Alexandra	13 December 1947
16	Aldershot	0–0	Swindon Town	13 December 1947
Replay	Swindon Town	2–0	Aldershot	20 December 1947
17	Colchester United	1–0	Wrexham	13 December 1947

== Third round proper ==
The 44 First and Second Division clubs entered the competition at this stage, along with Rotherham United, Queens Park Rangers and Swansea Town.

The matches were scheduled for Saturday, 10 January 1948. Two matches were drawn and went to replays on the following Saturday.

Tie no	Home team	Score	Away team	Date
1	Blackpool	4–0	Leeds United	10 January 1948
2	Bournemouth & Boscombe Athletic	1–2	Wolverhampton Wanderers	10 January 1948
3	Burnley	0–2	Swindon Town	10 January 1948
4	Liverpool	4–1	Nottingham Forest	10 January 1948
5	Southampton	1–0	Sunderland	10 January 1948
6	Gillingham	1–1	Queens Park Rangers	10 January 1948
Replay	Queens Park Rangers	3–1	Gillingham	17 January 1948
7	Leicester City	1–0	Bury	10 January 1948
8	Blackburn Rovers	0–0	West Ham United	10 January 1948
Replay	West Ham United	2–4	Blackburn Rovers	17 January 1948
9	Aston Villa	4–6	Manchester United	10 January 1948
10	Bolton Wanderers	0–2	Tottenham Hotspur	10 January 1948
11	Grimsby Town	1–4	Everton	10 January 1948
12	Crewe Alexandra	3–1	Sheffield United	10 January 1948
13	West Bromwich Albion	2–0	Reading	10 January 1948
14	Derby County	2–0	Chesterfield	10 January 1948
15	Stockport County	3–0	Torquay United	10 January 1948
16	Manchester City	2–1	Barnsley	10 January 1948
17	Fulham	2–0	Doncaster Rovers	10 January 1948
18	Bristol Rovers	3–0	Swansea Town	10 January 1948
19	Coventry City	2–1	Walsall	10 January 1948
20	Portsmouth	4–1	Brighton & Hove Albion	10 January 1948
21	Plymouth Argyle	2–4	Luton Town	10 January 1948
22	Millwall	1–2	Preston North End	10 January 1948
23	Hull City	1–3	Middlesbrough	10 January 1948
24	Crystal Palace	0–1	Chester	10 January 1948
25	Chelsea	5–0	Barrow	10 January 1948
26	Mansfield Town	2–4	Stoke City	10 January 1948
27	Cardiff City	1–2	Sheffield Wednesday	10 January 1948
28	Charlton Athletic	2–1	Newcastle United	10 January 1948
29	Arsenal	0–1	Bradford Park Avenue	10 January 1948
30	Rotherham United	0–3	Brentford	10 January 1948
31	Colchester United	1–0	Huddersfield Town	10 January 1948
32	Birmingham City	0–2	Notts County	10 January 1948

== Fourth round proper ==
The matches were scheduled for Saturday, 24 January 1948. One game was drawn and went to a replay, which was played on the following Saturday.

Tie no	Home team	Score	Away team	Date
1	Blackpool	4–0	Chester	24 January 1948
2	Southampton	3–2	Blackburn Rovers	24 January 1948
3	Leicester City	2–1	Sheffield Wednesday	24 January 1948
4	Wolverhampton Wanderers	1–1	Everton	24 January 1948
Replay	Everton	3–2	Wolverhampton Wanderers	31 January 1948
5	Crewe Alexandra	0–3	Derby County	24 January 1948
6	Luton Town	3–2	Coventry City	24 January 1948
7	Swindon Town	1–0	Notts County	24 January 1948
8	Tottenham Hotspur	3–1	West Bromwich Albion	24 January 1948
9	Manchester City	2–0	Chelsea	24 January 1948
10	Queens Park Rangers	3–0	Stoke City	24 January 1948
11	Fulham	5–2	Bristol Rovers	24 January 1948
12	Brentford	1–2	Middlesbrough	24 January 1948
13	Portsmouth	1–3	Preston North End	24 January 1948
14	Manchester United	3–0	Liverpool	24 January 1948
15	Charlton Athletic	3–0	Stockport County	24 January 1948
16	Colchester United	3–2	Bradford Park Avenue	24 January 1948

== Fifth round proper ==
The matches were scheduled for Saturday, 7 February 1948. There was one replay, taking place the following Saturday. Colchester United, the first non-league club to reach this stage (or its pre-1925 equivalent) since Cardiff City in 1919-20, was the last club from the qualifying rounds left in the competition.

Tie no	Home team	Score	Away team	Date
1	Blackpool	5–0	Colchester United	7 February 1948
2	Southampton	3–0	Swindon Town	7 February 1948
3	Middlesbrough	1–2	Derby County	7 February 1948
4	Tottenham Hotspur	5–2	Leicester City	7 February 1948
5	Manchester City	0–1	Preston North End	7 February 1948
6	Queens Park Rangers	3–1	Luton Town	7 February 1948
7	Fulham	1–1	Everton	7 February 1948
Replay	Everton	0–1	Fulham	14 February 1948
8	Manchester United	2–0	Charlton Athletic	7 February 1948

== Sixth round proper ==
The four quarter-final ties were scheduled to be played on Saturday, 28 February 1948. There was one replay, in the QPR–Derby County match.

Tie no	Home team	Score	Away team	Date
1	Southampton	0–1	Tottenham Hotspur	28 February 1948
2	Queens Park Rangers	1–1	Derby County	28 February 1948
Replay	Derby County	5–0	Queens Park Rangers	6 March 1948
3	Fulham	0–2	Blackpool	28 February 1948
4	Manchester United	4–1	Preston North End	28 February 1948

== Semi-finals ==
The semi-final matches were played on Saturday, 13 March 1948. Manchester United and Blackpool won their ties to meet in the final at Wembley. The gate receipts for the tie at Villa Park were £18,817 a record at the time for that ground.

13 March 1948
15:00

Blackpool	3–1 (a.e.t.)	Tottenham Hotspur
Stan Mortensen 86', 93' (?)		Duquemin 64'

Villa Park, Birmingham
Attendance: 70,687

13 March 1948
15:00

Manchester United	3–1	Derby County
Stan Pearson

Hillsborough, Sheffield

== Final ==
The 1948 FA Cup final was contested by Manchester United and Blackpool at Wembley Stadium on 24 April 1948. Both teams played in a changed strip, Blackpool in white shirts and blue shorts and Manchester United in unfamiliar blue shirts and white shorts. Stanley Matthews was playing his first season for Blackpool and they led the favourites 2-1 only to lose to United, who hadn't appeared in an FA Cup final for 39 years, won 4–2, with two goals from Jack Rowley and one apiece from Stan Pearson and John Anderson. Eddie Shimwell and Stan Mortensen scored Blackpool's goals. With his goal, Shimwell became the first full-back to score at Wembley whilst Stan Mortensen maintained his record of scoring in every round. The cup had gone to United in a game that many critics still rate as the best footballing final ever seen at Wembley Stadium. One reporter David Pole, commented; "If United's display was as close to perfection as any team could hope to go, Blackpool's was not far behind."

=== Match details ===
24 April 1948

Manchester United	4–2	Blackpool
Rowley 28' 70'; Pearson 80'; Anderson 82'	(Report)	Shimwell 12' (pen.); Mortensen 35'

Wembley Stadium, London
Attendance: 99,842
Referee: C. J. Barrick (Northamptonshire)

Manchester United	Blackpool

== See also ==
- List of FA Cup finals
