= 1947–48 Blackpool F.C. season =

English football club season

Blackpool F.C.
1947–48 season
- Manager: Joe Smith
- Division One: 9th
- FA Cup: Final
- Top goalscorer: League: Stan Mortensen (21); All: Stan Mortensen (31)
Home colours

The 1947–48 season was Blackpool F.C.'s 40th season (37th consecutive) in the Football League. They competed in the 22-team Division One, then the top tier of English football, finishing ninth. They also reached the FA Cup Final, in which they lost 4–2 to Manchester United (see 1948 FA Cup Final).

Stan Mortensen was the club's top scorer for the fourth consecutive season, with 31 goals (21 in the league and ten in the FA Cup, including a hat-trick against Tottenham in the semi-finals).

== Table ==
Pos	Team	Pld	W	D	L	GF	GA	GAv	Pts
7	Preston North End	42	20	7	15	67	68	0.985	47
8	Portsmouth	42	19	7	16	68	50	1.360	45
9	Blackpool	42	17	10	15	57	41	1.390	44
10	Manchester City	42	15	12	15	52	47	1.106	42
11	Liverpool	42	16	10	16	65	61	1.066	42

Source: World Football
Rules for classification: 1) Points; 2) Goal average; 3) Goals scored
