= Football League War Cup =

English association football cup in World War II

- Organiser(s): FA
- Founded: 1939
- Abolished: 1945; 81 years ago
- Region: United Kingdom
- Related competitions: FA Cup
- Last champions: Bolton Wanderers (1st title)

The Football League War Cup was an association football tournament held between 1939 and 1945. It aimed to fill the gap left in English football by the suspension of the FA Cup during the Second World War. Though it was often referred to in contemporary coverage as the "League Cup" or "Football League Cup", it is not to be confused with the later English football competition with the same name, which was formed in 1960 and is currently known as the EFL Cup. As with all wartime football in England, records and statistics from the competition are not considered official.

== Overview ==
The Football League (War) Cup was formed in 1940 to be a replacement for the FA Cup, which had been suspended for the duration of the conflict. Ties were played over two legs in order to boost revenue for clubs. In the 1941–42 season, 16 clubs from London and South East England did not participate owing to a dispute with the Football League over the formation of a separate London League. Instead they competed in the London War Cup. The winners of the London War Cup faced the winners of the Football League War Cup in a play-off. The London clubs re-joined the Football League in the summer of 1942 and the separate London cup competition was discontinued.

To reduce traveling distances for clubs, after 1942 the competition was split into north and south sections, each with its own final. The South Cup had a round-robin group stage comprising four groups of four clubs who would play each other at home and away, with the group winners advancing to the semi-finals. The North Cup had 48 entrants and used a more complicated format. The standings in the North Football League table after ten matches determined the 32 qualifiers for the competition proper. Teams would then progressively knock each other out in two-legged ties that also counted as league matches. The north final was decided over two legs. The south final was a single match held at Wembley Stadium. The North and South champions would then meet in a play-off to decide the competition's overall winner; play-off matches were held at Stamford Bridge. Gate receipts from the play-off matches were donated to King George's Fund for Sailors.

== Results ==
=== Finals ===
Keys

- playoff result after the final ended in a tie.

Ed.	Year	Winner	Score	Runner-up	Venue	City
1	1940	West Ham United	1–0	Blackburn Rovers	Wembley	London
2	1941	Preston North End	1–1	Arsenal	Wembley	London
2	1941	Preston North End	2–1	Arsenal	Ewood Park	Blackburn
3	1942	Wolverhampton Wanderers	2–2	Sunderland	Roker Park	Sunderland
3	1942	Wolverhampton Wanderers	4–1	Sunderland	Molineux	Wolverhampton
4	1943	Blackpool	4–2	Arsenal	Stamford Bridge	London
5	1944	Charlton Athletic (Note: As no replay match was held, the title was awarded to both clubs.)	1–1	(none)	Stamford Bridge	London
5	1944	Aston Villa	1–1	(none)	Stamford Bridge	London
6	1945	Bolton Wanderers	2–1	Chelsea	Stamford Bridge	London

=== Northern Final ===
Season	Winner	Runner-up
1943	Blackpool	Sheffield Wednesday
1944	Aston Villa	Blackpool
1945	Bolton Wanderers	Manchester United

=== Southern Final ===
Season	Winner	Runner-up
1943	Arsenal	Charlton Athletic
1944	Charlton Athletic	Chelsea
1945	Chelsea	Millwall

== Finals details ==
=== 1939–40 ===
Final
8 June 1940

West Ham United	1–0	Blackburn Rovers
Small

Wembley
Attendance: 42,399

137 games (including replays) were played to get to the final of the inaugural Football League War Cup. These matches were condensed into just 9 weeks. Despite the fears that London would be bombed by the Luftwaffe fans came in thousands to watch the game at Wembley, despite its obvious danger as a bombing target.

=== 1940–41 ===
Final
10 May 1941

Preston North End	1–1	Arsenal
McLaren		Compton

Wembley
Attendance: 60,000
31 May 1941
Replay

Preston North End	2–1	Arsenal
Beattie		Gallimore (o.g.)

Ewood Park
Attendance: 5,000

In the nine months leading up to the final, 127 large-scale night-raids had taken place, with London, the home of the final, being a regular target. This threat did not stop 60,000 people turning up to watch the game.

Preston North End beat Bury, Bolton, Tranmere Rovers (20-2 on aggregate), Manchester City and Newcastle (2–0 on aggregate) to reach the final. Andrew McLaren had scored nine goals during the tournament, including five goals in Preston's 12–1 home leg win over Tranmere. Thanks to a 40th minute equaliser from Arsenal's D. Compton in the game at Wembley, this was the first final of the tournament to go to a replay. L. Compton of Arsenal struck the Preston post with a missed penalty in the 3rd minute.

The replay was moved away from London to Ewood Park. The win for Preston meant that they had completed the first wartime league and cup double, having also won the Northern Regional League.

=== 1941–42 ===
Final
23 May 1942
First leg

Sunderland	2–2	Wolverhampton Wanderers
Carter 54'; Stubbins 77'		Westcott 11', 85'

Roker Park, Sunderland
Attendance: 34,776
Referee: J. M. Wiltshire
30 May 1942
Second leg

Wolverhampton Wanderers	4–1	Sunderland
Westcott 35'; Broome 51'; Rowley 59', 70'		Carter 58'

Molineux, Wolverhampton
Attendance: 43,038
Referee: J. M. Wiltshire

The third competition in 1942 saw the final switched to a two-legged format with each team playing one leg on their home ground. This was the only time in the tournament's history that the final was decided in such a way.

Eric Robinson of Wolves was to die soon after his team won the tournament, during a military exercise.

On 6 June 1942, Wolves faced Brentford, winners of the London War Cup (clubs from London did not participate in the FLWC that season), in a cup winners play-off held at Stamford Bridge. The match ended 1–1 and was not replayed, so the clubs shared the honour.

=== 1942–43 ===
North Final
1 May 1943
First leg

Blackpool	2–2	Sheffield Wednesday

Bloomfield Road
Attendance: 28,000
8 May 1943
Second leg

Sheffield Wednesday	1–2	Blackpool

Hillsborough Stadium
Attendance: 42,657.
South Final
1 May 1943

Arsenal	7–1	Charlton Athletic

Wembley
Attendance: 75,000
Final
15 May 1943

Arsenal	2–4	Blackpool

Stamford Bridge
Attendance: 55,195

In its final three years, the competition was split into north and south halves, with the winners of each section competing in a play-off, staged at Stamford Bridge, to decide the cup winner. The northern winners were decided over two legs, while the southern finalists met in a one-off Wembley final.

The overall final marked the second time Arsenal had got to the final. They would end up being the club who had reached the most Football League War Cup finals, yet did not win once. The final was also notable because both clubs had won their respective wartime divisions.

=== 1943–44 ===
North final
First leg

Blackpool	2–1	Aston Villa

Bloomfield Road
Attendance: 28,000
Second leg

Aston Villa	4–2	Blackpool

Villa Park
Attendance: 54,824
South Final

Charlton Athletic	3–1	Chelsea

Wembley
Attendance: 85,000
Final
20 May 1944

Charlton Athletic	1–1	Aston Villa
	Shared

Stamford Bridge
Attendance: 38,540

The score in the final was tied at 1–1 but due to transport restrictions and bombing threats, a replay was not held and the game ended a draw. Charlton Athletic and Aston Villa shared the 1944 trophy, an event that had not happened before and did not happen again.

=== 1944–45 ===
North final
First leg

Bolton Wanderers	1–0	Manchester United

Burnden Park
Attendance: 40,000
Second leg

Manchester United	2–2	Bolton Wanderers

Maine Road
Attendance: 40,000
South Final
7 April 1945

Chelsea	2–0	Millwall

Wembley
Attendance: 90,000
Final
2 June 1945

Chelsea	1–2	Bolton Wanderers

Stamford Bridge
Attendance: 35,000

== See also ==
- Association football during World War I
- Association football during World War II
- London War Cup
