= History of Blackpool F.C. (1887–1962) =

History of an English football club

This is a history of Blackpool Football Club from 1887 to 1962. For their history between 1962 and the present day, see History of Blackpool F.C. (1962–present). For the club's season-by-season stats, see Blackpool F.C. seasons.

Blackpool F.C.'s finishing positions in the Football League between 1897 and 1962

The history of Blackpool Football Club between 1887 and 1962 covers the years from the club's foundation, via a split from another Blackpool-based club; the period of nine years before they gained membership to the Football League; their recovery after losing their League status after only three seasons; and finally their rise into Division One, which was then the top tier of English football. Aside from the League, Blackpool also appeared in three FA Cup Finals in six years, finding success in their third attempt, in 1953. The same year, the club supplied the England team with four players for an international game against Hungary.

Between 1903 and 1962, Blackpool had nine different managers, with Joe Smith occupying the role for 23 of those 59 years. Prior to 1903, team selections were made by the board.

== Early years ==
Blackpool Football Club were formed on 26 July 1887, through a breakaway group from the local St. John's F.C. Mike Jackman's Blackburn Rovers: A Complete Record, 1875–1990, published in 1990, makes reference to a game against "Blackpool" in December 1880, but whether this was today's club is not clear. The St. John's club had been in existence for a decade or so, risen from the ashes of the disbanded Victoria Club. Five members of the club – Revd. N.S. Jeffrey, Sam Bancroft, Dick Swanbrick, Dick Worthington and W.J. Brown – felt it was necessary for the town of Blackpool to have a football club bearing its name. After a disagreement with the other members regarding the possibility of having their name drop the denominational suffix and become a town team, the men left the meeting, went next door to the Stanley Arms Hotel, and immediately founded Blackpool Football Club. The remainder of the St. John's players eventually defected to join the new club, in turn making the former defunct. It was with these individuals that Blackpool F.C. played their first competitive game, at Dole Lane, the home of Chorley, in which they recorded a 2–1 victory. Hargreaves scored Blackpool's first-ever goal with "a ponderous kick half the length of the field". Corry added a second, before the hosts scored a late consolation.

In the club's first season, 1887–88, they won the Fylde Cup and the Lancashire Junior Cup. In the second competition, Blackpool faced Preston St. Joseph's at Preston North End's Deepdale ground, a venue that the seaside club argued was not neutral. The match took place on 24 March 1888. Blackpool went a goal down after 35 minutes, and that is how the score remained at half-time. Two minutes into the second half, Joe Nelson equalised. T. Parr scored the winner in the final minute.

At the end-of-season annual general meeting on 14 May 1888, held at the Stanley Arms, club president Alderman John Bickerstaff announced a small profit of around £20, with £66 contributed in membership and subscription fees.

At this point in time, Blackpool played home matches at Raikes Hall (or the Royal Palace Gardens), part of a large entertainment complex containing several attractions, including a theatre and a boating lake. This meant that average attendances hovered around the two-thousand mark, making the club's early years financially successful. Profits almost trebled by the end of the following season, at which point the club became founder members of the Lancashire League. In the league's first season, 1889–90, Blackpool finished fifth out of the thirteen member clubs. The following three seasons saw them finish runners-up, to Bury in 1890–91 and 1891–92, and on goal-difference to Liverpool in 1892–93.

In 1891, Blackpool faced overseas opposition for the first time when a touring Canadian side played at Raikes Hall.

Blackpool's debut in the first-round proper of the FA Cup occurred in 1891–92, with a visit from Sheffield United to Raikes Hall. The Yorkshiremen won 3–0. A second tie against the same opposition occurred the following season, with the Blades again victorious, this time by a 3–1 margin.

On 25 February 1893, after Blackpool defeated South Shore 4–0, the contentious issue of the amalgamation of the two clubs was raised. The Gazette and News commented: "He must be a hot-headed supporter of either South Shore or Fleetwood Rangers who will not admit that the Blackpool team is the strongest in the Fylde. To our mind, the sooner the South Shore and Blackpool clubs are fused into one, the better it will be." Despite both clubs' committees being in favour, a meeting of over two hundred South Shore members on 10 April decided to carry on independently, and further talk of a merger was not discussed for another six years.

In 1893–94, Blackpool claimed the Lancashire League title, winning fifteen out of their 22 games to finish three points clear of the nearest competition. After returning to the runners-up berth the following season, they went on to struggle near the foot of the table. The board decided that they could make no further headway in local football and, on 13 May 1896, the club became a limited company and applied for entry to the Football League. They failed with their first attempt, but their second was successful.

Blackpool's third FA Cup encounter, which took place earlier in 1896, proved marginally more successful than the previous two, as they defeated Burton Swifts in the first round, only to be eliminated three weeks later at the hands of Bolton Wanderers. It was reported that the Blackpool players were on a win bonus of around ten shillings (fifty pence), whereas their opponents were paid an extra 45 shillings (£2.25) if they were the victors.

== In and out of the Football League ==
Blackpool's application to the Football League was successful, and for the club's debut season, they joined the sixteen-team Second Division along with Gainsborough Trinity and Walsall, replacing Crewe Alexandra, Burslem Port Vale and Rotherham County.

The club's first-ever Football League game took place on 5 September 1896, at Lincoln City. The fact that the game took place at all is notable in itself, because it took the Blackpool team six hours to travel what was just a 150-mile (240 km) journey. The players, directors and club doctor caught the 7am train from Blackpool North and endured a journey via Manchester and Birmingham. They had to change trains on two occasions, with the players' only exercise being a run up and down the platform.

The game was due to kick off at 2pm, but due to the fact that it was "raining incessantly", causing the pitch to resemble a swamp, the referee delayed the start by fifteen minutes while the players acclimatized themselves.

When the match got underway, Blackpool found themselves a goal behind after five minutes. The Imps doubled their lead a minute before half-time.

The players reluctantly came out for the second half as conditions got steadily worse. Most of the 1,500 spectators had decided that a warm seat by the fireside was infinitely more enjoyable than standing around a muddy field.

Ten minutes after the restart, Blackpool scored their first-ever League goal, courtesy of a Charlie Mount free-kick. Blackpool could not find the equalising goal, however, and five minutes from time they conceded a third. The Athletic News reported that Blackpool had "a weakness in front of goal, plus a rather poor defence."

The club finished the season in eighth position, which would remain their highest placing for the next fourteen years, and had managed to attract relatively large attendances to Raikes Hall. One year later, however, that all changed when they announced a loss of £1,183. The club had started with capital of around £2,000, but the players' wages amounted to almost exactly three-quarters of that total. With attendance numbers declining to an average of two thousand, the club's financial position, which had once been healthy, was now looking bleak.

On the pitch, too, Blackpool had begun to struggle. They finished the 1897–98 season in eleventh place and failed to make the first-round proper of the FA Cup. This came after moving to a new home, the Athletic Grounds in the town's present-day Stanley Park, as Raikes Hall required upgrading. The move was made without damaging their financial status too much; they announced a loss of only £441 2s 5½d, despite a reduction in admission prices. The club's League status became increasingly worse, however. They finished the 1898–99 season in sixteenth place, two points ahead of Loughborough, and, along with fellow Lancastrians Darwen, failed to gain re-election. They were replaced by Middlesbrough and Chesterfield. They also set a new and existing club record of consecutive defeats: eight, between 26 November and 7 January.

The first seven home games of that doomed 1898–99 campaign were played at the Athletic Grounds, but when it became apparent that the proposed redevelopment of Raikes Hall would be delayed, the club returned to the ground for the remainder of the season.

During the close season, Frank Wilson, a centre-forward signed from Gravesend United two years earlier, died at the age of 22 from "maniacal exhaustion caused by football and excitement". On the day he died, he should have been transferred to Aston Villa or Sunderland.

Much to the dismay of the Blackpool faithful, in 1899, during the season back in Lancashire League football, it was decided that the club would amalgamate with local rivals South Shore F.C., the thinking being that one club would be more successful than two. South Shore had experienced limited success in the Lancashire League but had put their name on the football map four years earlier when they defeated Notts County in the FA Cup at the former's Cow Gap Lane home in what was a huge giantkilling act.

After the merger, which was completed on 12 December 1899, most of South Shore's players joined Blackpool, with Blackpool moving to South Shore's Bloomfield Road ground.

Blackpool's one season out of the Football League was only moderately successful, with their finishing in third place in the Lancashire League. However, at the League's annual meeting on 25 May 1900, they were able to regain a place in Division Two, along with Lancashire League champions Stockport County.

The club's committee set about rebuilding the team in an attempt to cope with League football again. Notable signings included Joe Dorrington, a goalkeeper from Blackburn Rovers; Harold Hardman, a local schoolboy who played at outside-left but went on to bigger things at Everton and as a director at Manchester United; and Jack Parkinson, who had been the club's top scorer in their first season in the League, returned after a brief taste of First Division football with Liverpool. On his way out of the club was Jack Cox, who was sold to Liverpool for the large sum of £150.

== Early 20th century ==
In their first season back in the League, the club attained a twelfth-placed finish despite suffering their record defeat; 10–1 at Small Heath. The referee blew the whistle for time four minutes early, with the score 9–1, and did not realise until the players had reached the dressing room and the crowd had all left. He took them out for the remaining four minutes, during which Small Heath scored a tenth goal. No joy was to be had in the FA Cup yet again.

Blackpool began the 1901–02 season at Gamble's Field, the former home of South Shore, on the town's Bloomfield Road. The name of the ground was subsequently renamed for the road on which it stood. They finished thirteenth at the end of the campaign, at which point the club was surviving solely on the income from gate receipts and the increasing generosity of members of its committee.

In 1903, R.B. Middleton moved to Blackburn Rovers to become secretary of the East Lancashire club, and 33-year-old Rossendale native Tom Barcroft took over his duties at Bloomfield Road. It was meant to be a temporary appointment, but Barcroft remained in the role for well over thirty years. He stabilised the club as it tried to find its feet in the early years of its existence.

Between 1902–03 and 1904–05, Blackpool enjoyed little in the way of success, with one fourteenth- and two fifteenth-placed finishing positions in the table. There was, however, a significant increase in attendances, with as many as 7,000 turning out for the visit of Bolton Wanderers on 10 October 1903, although it was reported that at least 3,000 of them were travelling supporters.

Finances were still in a precarious state, and for the start of the 1905–06 season a new board of directors was formed, with Charles Ramsden as chairman and Tom Barcroft remaining in his capacity as secretary.

In January of the same season, the club made the first round of the FA Cup after two seasons of elimination in its qualifying rounds, but a 2–1 defeat at Bristol City ensued. A year later, in the same competition, Blackpool enjoyed their finest moment to date: after beating Crystal Palace over three games, they were drawn at home to the powerful Sheffield United. The board, mindful about financial restrictions, "sold" the ground rights and agreed to play at Bramall Lane. Despite protests from the Blackpool support, the move was agreed, and on 3 February 1906, Blackpool travelled to South Yorkshire and won the game 2–1. What made the victory all the more sweet for the club was that they still made around £300 from the game. They banked a further £650 from the third-round tie at Newcastle United, which they lost 5–0 in front of 35,000 fans.

Also during 1905–06, Blackpool had their first serious reprimand from the football authorities over crowd behaviour. It came after a 3–0 home defeat to West Brom, when referee W. Gilgryst had to be escorted from the field, protected from furious spectators who vented their anger regarding some controversial decisions. One of these had included the "sending-off" of a Blackpool fan for abusive language. Gilgryst was forced to leave the ground with the assistance of two police officers, and at the sounding of the final whistle, two hundred fans invaded the Bloomfield Road pitch. The club was severely censured by the Football League and told to take every step to prevent a repeat of such scenes.

A year on from the Sheffield United game, the Blackpool directors again sold the ground rights of an FA Cup tie, this time for a first-round game against West Ham on 12 January 1907. The recently opened Upton Park attracted 13,000 on that day, which resulted in Blackpool's receiving £300 from the gate receipts. The FA Cup did not offer any further financial gain, however – a 2–1 win for the Hammers ending the Lancashire club's interest in the competition. They finished thirteenth in the League.

For the 1907–08 season, a new board was introduced, with the availability of more money being promised. Fred Seed succeeded Charles Ramsden as chairman, and the club began to purchase new players. Serious injuries at the start of the season left Blackpool struggling, and they finished in the lower half of the table once again. They also experienced another early exit from the FA Cup, this time at the hands of Manchester United.

Forward Bob Whittingham was sold to Bradford City in January 1909. Although he left Blackpool midway through the 1908–09 season, he finished as the Seasiders' top scorer at the end of the season. Yet again, the club had struggled again; they finished bottom and successfully applied for re-election.

Jack Cox returned to Blackpool at the start of the 1909–10 season, as an unofficial player-manager, and the team's fortunes took an upturn as they achieved a mid-table finish.

Increasingly dire financial straits meant the club were again obliged to sell the ground rights of another FA Cup game. This time, the match against Manchester United at Old Trafford netted Blackpool £680, with 20,000 spectators witnessing a home victory, 2–1.

Back in the League, there was a marked improvement in Blackpool's fortunes. They finished seventh in what was their most successful season to date. The following two seasons – 1911–12 and 1912–13 – saw a return to previous form, however, with final positions of fourteenth and rock-bottom twentieth achieved, the latter meaning they had to apply for re-election again. Their application was successful once more.

The 1913–14 season concluded with Blackpool in sixteenth place, and an early FA Cup exit at the hands of lowly Gillingham, then in the Southern League, proved to be somewhat of a shock. One of the notable signings that season was Joe Lane, who moved south from Sunderland. Lane, who had been playing Hungarian football prior to joining the Roker Park club, cost Blackpool £400. He proceeded to repay them immediately, however, netting eleven goals in his first season and 28 (which was the leading total for the club) the following season. He continued to score regularly for the remainder of his Bloomfield Road career.

Almost predictably, Blackpool's involvement in the 1914–15 FA Cup ended in the first round, which was the final season before World War II's intervention, at which point football, like other professional sports, was abandoned until hostilities ended.

Eventually, football was resurrected with unfamiliar regional leagues, and Blackpool stitched together a side during the remaining war years. They were relatively successful during the first season, finishing third in the principal competition of the Lancashire section, followed by second in the subsidiary tournament. They were not as successful again until the end of the 1918–19 season, when they were victorious in Section "A" of the subsidiary competition. Their section contained only local clubs Burnley, Preston North End and Blackburn Rovers. The winners of the four sections qualified for the semi-finals of the Lancashire Senior Cup, in which Blackpool lost to Liverpool by a single goal at Bloomfield Road.

When football-proper was resumed, in 1919–20, Blackpool had by that point joined the increasing number of clubs to appoint a full-time manager, in the form of Bill Norman. Norman had taken over the role twelve months earlier after leaving Huddersfield Town. A fitness fanatic, Norman organised strict training routines in an attempt to make his footballers achieve the highest possible level of fitness. It seemed to do the trick, as Blackpool finished fourth in Division Two, their highest finish yet, and won the Central League Championship; however, their progress in the FA Cup ended in the second round.

In March 1920, Joe Lane was sold to Birmingham City for a then-record fee of £3,600. His departure, not for the first time, caused an uproar in the town, with many fans questioning the board's ambition. At the end of the season, however, the club announced a profit of £2,383, a marked difference from the £1,337 loss the previous year. It was not all good news: a fire in the West Stand all but destroyed the structure, and a large outlay was needed for its reconstruction.

The club's improvement continued into the 1920–21 season, with another promotion push; however, a poor run-in cost them. Their fourth-placed finish was viewed as a huge disappointment by the fans, particularly because the team had spent the majority of the campaign atop the table. They exited the FA Cup in the second round again, this time at the hands of non-League Southend United. On the goalscoring front, only one player broke into double figures: Heathcote, with 18.

On 27 December 1920, in a League encounter at Barnsley, young full-back Horace Fairhurst received a blow to the head. He died at home eleven days later as a result of the injury.

The 1921–22 season saw Blackpool flirt with relegation to the new Division Three North. They went into the final two games, both against West Ham, knowing that they had to take six points out of six to make safety. The Londoners were on the coattails of promotion, but Blackpool won both fixtures – 2–0 at Upton Park and 3–1 at Bloomfield Road seven days later – escaping the drop by a single point, at the expense of Bradford City and Bristol City.

Blackpool struggled despite the fact that they had acquired the signature of goalscoring machine Harry Bedford from Nottingham Forest. Bedford would go on to emulate Joe Lane by scoring the majority of the team's goals over the following seasons.

Also joining the club was Bert Baverstock from Bolton Wanderers, who was installed as captain, although an injury early on in his Blackpool career limited his appearances.

Again, without a cup run to swell their finances, the club announced another loss, this time totalling £2,994, for the 1921–22 season. Nonetheless, the Bloomfield Road ground continued to be improved, with extra concrete added to the Spion Kop, increasing the overall capacity to 18,000.

As the 1922–23 campaign drew to a close, the club found themselves in the running for promotion; however, three defeats in their final six games meant only a fifth-placed finish was achieved, largely as a result of Harry Bedford's 32 goals. After the final curtain came down, Bill Norman and his assistant, son-in-law Allan Ure, both moved to Leeds United. Ure returned to Bloomfield Road as trainer in 1928.

Norman's ability to strengthen the team had been handicapped by a lack of funds, with the only real exception being the purchase of Harry White from Arsenal for £1,225. White's fee increased Blackpool's overall loss at the end of the season to £4,000, and measures were put in place to rectify it.

Blackpool adopted this crest in 1923.

For the 1923–24 season, Major Frank Buckley, previously manager at Norwich City, was installed as Norman's successor. Blackpool failed to win any of their first seven games; however, they eventually began to play as a unit and, with the help of another 32 goals by Bedford, attained a fourth-placed finish.

It was at this time that Blackpool adopted their famous tangerine shirts. Albert Hargreaves, who officiated a Netherlands–Belgium international match, was impressed by the Dutchmen's colours and suggested that Blackpool start the season wearing them. The colours were adopted and received with universal praise from the fans, although the black collars, cuffs and shorts made the kit seem "uneven". After an FA Cup game at Blackburn on 7 March 1925, the black was dropped when it was suggested that visitors had lost because the players could not see each other in the murky atmosphere.

For the 1924–25 season there were more off-the-field problems, the majority of a financial nature. A writ was presented to the club for £3,618 from the builders of the redeveloped South Stand, of which the club had only managed to pay £1,000. After a drawn-out meeting, it was decided to double the share capital, bringing it up to £10,000 in order to pay off the outstanding debt. In addition, the board underwent several changes, with new members being added in the hope of providing much-needed cash to help alleviate the dire situation. Sir Lindsay Parkinson resigned as president, to be replaced by Alderman John Bickerstaffe. Also, the Blackpool Supporters' Club was formed, and in its early days boasted a membership of over three hundred.

On the field, the team, without new blood, struggled. They spent most of the season fighting relegation, although Harry Bedford top-scored for the fourth consecutive season, with 28 goals in all competitions. Only the consistent Matt Barrass also reached double figures. The club made it into the fourth round of the FA Cup for the first time, in which they lost to Blackburn Rovers by a single goal in front of 60,000 fans.

On 9 May 1925, Blackpool won the inaugural end-of-season Victoria Hospital Cup, defeating Everton 2–1 at Bloomfield Road.

Two of Blackpool's top players left the club during the 1925–26 season, both for much-welcomed large fees. Herbert Jones went to Blackburn for £3,850 and "goalscoring machine" Harry Bedford was sold to Derby County for £3,500.

Despite the loss in playing talent, Blackpool attained a League finish of sixth place. The board spent a large part of the transfer money on the new South Stand, although its final cost of £13,146 was slightly more than they had foreseen. Nevertheless, it had increased the capacity of Bloomfield Road to well over 20,000.

The 1926–27 season saw Teddy Rosebroom and Stanley Streets move to Chesterfield and Clapton Orient, respectively. In came forward Tommy Browell from Manchester City for £1,100. Then at the veteran stage of his career, Browell had played in the previous season's FA Cup Final, and he expected to add experience to the Blackpool team; however, the club made little progress, finishing ninth. One success, though, was the form of centre-forward Billy Tremelling, who scored 31 goals in total. He later moved to centre-half to accommodate an even richer goalscoring talent in the shape of Jimmy Hampson.

Hampson was signed from Nelson in October 1927 for £1,000, and he proved to be one of the club's most astute buys. In his first season he scored 31 goals in 32 League appearances, including four in a home win over Nottingham Forest. He went on to contribute immensely to the team over the next decade, and he could rightly stake his claim as one of the club's greatest talents.

Other new faces in the 1927–28 season included Johnny McIntyre from Bristol Rovers, Horace Williams from New Brighton, William Grant from East Stirlingshire, Syd Brookes from Scunthorpe United, and a twin signing for £4,500 of Jack Oxberry and Stan Ramsay from the North-East.

There was also a new manager. Sydney Beaumont, a former Preston North End player, replaced Major Frank Buckley, who left for Wolves. Beaumont only lasted a season, however, in which Blackpool finished nineteenth, avoiding relegation by a single point. A milestone occurred on Christmas Eve 1927, when Blackpool played their 1,000th Football League game, at Fulham.

In a bid to cut costs, the club decided against appointing another full-time manager. Instead, they gave the title of "honorary manager" to director Harry Evans. Evans went on to hold the position for five years.

Despite another 40 goals from Jimmy Hampson in 1928–29, Blackpool could finish no higher than ninth. They were also embarrassed by Plymouth Argyle in the FA Cup, losing 3–0 on the south coast. The side's inconsistency was exposed in October and November 1928 when they recorded successive League results of 1–4, 4–0, 2–8 and 7–0. Hampson scored five goals in the last game of the sequence, against Reading.

There were a few additions to the squad, with the tough-tackling Scot Jimmy Hamilton joining from St Mirren, and goalkeeper Billy Mercer from Huddersfield Town. All in all, though, it had been another below-par campaign, and the pressure on the team to bring success to the town had become intense.

== League success ==
It was said that the 1929–30 season would be a make-or-break one. The team responded to the pressure. Under Harry Evans' guidance, Blackpool were crowned Division Two champions, their only League title to date, and reached the top flight for the first time in their history. The team held their nerve in the important run-in, including a victory at fellow title-challengers Oldham Athletic in front of a crowd of over 45,000. Blackpool claimed the title on the final day of the season, 3 May, with a goalless draw at Nottingham Forest. Runners-up Chelsea could have won the title themselves the same afternoon if they had won and Blackpool had lost, but the Londoners were defeated at Bury by a single goal. Jimmy Hampson's 45 League goals (the most in the country that season) was a Blackpool record for a single season, and still stands as such. In addition, the final points tally of 58 was equalled only once more before the three-for-a-win points system was introduced in 1981–82. For his part, Hampson wanted to avoid the spotlight and sneaked off to get the train home from Kirkham to avoid the fans who had gathered to welcome the team at Blackpool North.

During the successful season, Hampson had scored his 100th goal for Blackpool in only his 97th game. Also, the team had played in front of the largest crowds since the club's formation, including over 24,000 for the visit of Oldham.

Very few additions were made to the squad during the season, with only Charles Broadhurst and Percy Downes joining the Bloomfield Road staff. The players spent the subsequent summer months enjoying civic receptions and dinners held in their honour.

There were many changes made to the club prior to its first season of First Division football. With regards to the ground, a vast new terrace was erected on the north side of the ground, the Spion Kop, which at its peak could hold 12,000. It was not concreted for quite some time, but it did increase the capacity to around 30,000.

The playing staff was strengthened by the arrivals of J. McLelland, Eric Longden, Jack O'Donnell and Jackie Carr, yet the 1930–31 season must go down as one of the most disastrous in the club's history. The players found themselves out of their depth, and proceeded to capitulate to virtually all opposition. In the first game of the season, Arsenal won 4–1 at Bloomfield Road in front of a crowd of nearly 29,000. The team won the following game four days later, 4–2 at Manchester City, but the remaining nine months of the season proved to be a defensive nightmare. Four goals were conceded on five occasions; five goals four times; six goals twice, seven on three occasions, and finally ten without reply against Huddersfield Town, a result that remains a record victory for the Yorkshiremen, as well as Blackpool's joint-record defeat. All told, the Blackpool back line leaked a First Division record of 125 goals and lost 21 games during a season in which they finished twentieth.

Despite their defensive frailties, the club escaped relegation, with Jimmy Hampson's 32 goals being enough to secure First Division football for at least one more season. Also, a "£10,000 goal" from Albert Watson occurred in the final match, a 2–2 draw at home to Manchester City. The equaliser by the half-back was said to be worth at least that amount as it secured the club's short-term future with the guarantee of large attendances for the next twelve months. Finances were still an immediate concern, however, with the club now possessing a bank overdraft of over £17,000.

The 1931–32 season saw an improvement, in that only 102 goals were conceded, including another seven at Manchester City and five occurrences of a concession of five goals. Harry Evans had been busy during the close season, most notably signing Phil Watson from Hamilton Academical for £3,000. Watson replaced Billy Tremelling, who had moved to Preston North End. Walter Lax was brought in from Lincoln City, for whom he had scored 26 goals the previous season, plus Jack Everest from Rochdale, and a new goalkeeper, Alec Roxburgh.

Blackpool avoided the drop by yet again winning the final two games of the season, against Huddersfield and Sheffield United. Again, Hampson was top scorer, with 24 goals in total, and FA Cup interest ended again in the third round.

Season 1932–33, however, saw the club's luck run out. Hampson's goals had dried up by his own standards, with only eighteen to his name in the League, and Blackpool finished bottom of the table. After only three seasons in the top flight, they were relegated back to Division Two.

Eric Longden returned to Hull City for a "nominal" fee, but tricky outside-right Alec Reid signed from Preston. Changes were afoot in the boardroom too, with no less than six long-standing directors resigning. This came after a requisition was served on the board less than 48 hours after the club's relegation. The directors had no alternative but accept this as a vote "no confidence" in their management of the club's affairs. Two months later, only Sam Butterworth and Harry Evans remained with the club. Butterworth eventually became Life President, while Evans became chairman.

There were calls for the board to appoint a full-time manager again, and the request was answered with the appointment of Alex "Sandy" MacFarlane, a former Scotland international with fourteen years of managerial experience behind him. MacFarlane was a strict disciplinarian, a perfectionist who demonstrated his ruthlessness at the end of his first season by having a mass clear-out. Departing were Frank McDonough, Bobby Crawford, Bertie Thomson, Charlie Rattray, Walter Bussey, Albert Butterworth, Sammy Armes and Sidney Tufnell, all regulars during their years with the club.

The exodus was likely prompted by the side's inability to adjust to Second Division football, as they could finish only in mid-table, plus the almost-obligatory third-round FA Cup exit.

Also at the end of the 1933–34 campaign, Blackpool won the Victoria Hospital Cup after beating holders Everton 2–0.

On 3 July 1934, Blackpool's long-serving secretary Tom Barcroft received an illuminated manuscript in recognition of his 31 years of service to the club. He had been secretary for most of that period.

The following season, with the signing of Dickie Watmough from Bradford City for £3,000 and John Middleton from Darlington, a push for promotion was made. Blackpool missed out by only three points, finishing fourth, a marked improvement on the previous campaign. Only their failure to win any of their final three games denied them. Jimmy Hampson seemed back to his former self, once again topping the scoring chart, with twenty goals.

Hampson was joined in the forward line by a newcomer who had signed from Glentoran a year earlier for £1,000. His name was Peter Doherty, a player who went on to become one of his country's greatest-ever footballers. The planned regular link-up of Hampson, Doherty and Bobby Finan, who had joined the club from non-League football, did not become a realisation due to injuries to one or the other.

For the beginning of the 1935–36 season, the Blackpool board appointed former Reading manager Joe Smith to the Bloomfield Road hot seat, a seat he would occupy for the next 23 years.

Smith was a relaxed man who thoroughly enjoyed his football, and this showed in the teams that he produced at Bloomfield Road over the years. One of his first signings was Fred Chandler, from his old club, but for the most part he kept together the team he inherited from his predecessor Sandy MacFarlane, who, after leaving Blackpool, retired from the game at the age of 57.

On 11 January 1936, Blackpool hosted Margate in the FA Cup in what is believed to be the first game captured on film at Bloomfield Road. The tie, which Blackpool won 3–1, was filmed by the Tower Company and was later shown at the Winter Gardens and Grand Theatre.

Blackpool finished tenth in Smith's first season, and Bobby Finan racked-up 34 League goals and two FA Cup strikes.

A year later, the club finished runners-up to Leicester City and were promoted back to the top division. This was achieved with a minimal outlay on new players, with only Alex Munro costing a substantial fee. The Scot was signed from Hearts for £3,500. Other signings included Danny Blair from Aston Villa, Frank Hill from Arsenal and Willie Cook from Bolton Wanderers.

The twin strike-force of Hampson and Finan resulted in 44 goals, and with two other forwards – Dickie Watmough and Sammy Jones – also netting in the double-figures, Blackpool seemed a safe bet in Division One. However, finances were once again causing problems, and the Irish star Peter Doherty had to be sold. He went to Manchester City for the enormous fee of £10,000.

The 1937–38 season was overshadowed by the death of Jimmy Hampson. The forward was on a fishing expedition off the Fleetwood coast on 10 January 1938, when his boat collided with a trawler and sank. Hampson drowned, but his body was never recovered. His 252 goals in all competitions remains a Blackpool club record.

On the field, Blackpool settled well into the First Division and finished in twelfth place. Among the players who were emerging in the team were George Farrow, a right-back signed from Bournemouth, and Jock Wallace, who was challenging Alec Roxburgh hard for the goalkeeper's jersey. New signings Frank O'Donnell and Willie Buchan, both from Celtic, each cost £10,000, but there were less expensive imports too, such as Eric Sibley and Malcolm Butler.

Blackpool's 1938 club crest, which remained until 1968 before being revived again in the 1990s. It is still used today.

For the 1938–39 season, Blackpool spent over £60,000 on new players, a huge amount for the era. In came George Eastham from Bolton for £5,000, Tommy Lewis from Bradford City, Jock Dodds from Sheffield United for £10,500, and Hugh O'Donnell, brother of the departing Frank, for a further £2,500, plus many others such as Dai Astley, Malcolm McLaren, Dick Burke and William Park.

Frank O'Donnell's destination was Aston Villa, for £10,500. Also departing was Dickie Watmough, to Preston North End.

After five seasons of wearing dark- and light-blue-striped shirts, the team changed their home colours for the final time, back to tangerine.

At the outbreak of World War II, in September 1939, Blackpool sat atop the First Division after winning their opening three games. The team's good form continued through the non-competitive wartime period with the help of many guest players. In 1939–40, the first season of the wartime regional league, Blackpool finished third and reached the quarter-finals of the War Cup, assisted by the scoring feats of Jock Dodds. He netted thirty goals in eighteen league appearances, including seven in an 11–2 defeat of Oldham. Over the wartime seasons, Dodds scored over 200 goals. In 1941–42 alone, he scored 66 times. The team, meanwhile, won the Northern Section's first competition on three occasions, lifted the Lancashire Cup once, and reached the War Cup North final twice, winning the overall 1943 Football League War Cup final by defeating Arsenal, winners of the southern section, 4–2 at Stamford Bridge.

Blackpool's guest players, who, as in World War I, found themselves stationed in the town, including Ronnie Dix (Tottenham) and Alex Stevenson (Everton). There was also an outside-right who was a regular England international and played club football for Stoke City. His name was Stanley Matthews, and he made regular appearances for Blackpool during the war years, teaming up with a promising youngster by the name of Stan Mortensen.

For Blackpool as a club, one positive aspect of the war was the wiping-out of their bank overdraft, which stood at £33,704. With the armed forces requiring Bloomfield Road for various reasons, the rent paid by the War Office helped the club to become solvent once again.

When peace returned to Europe, Blackpool found themselves in a stronger position than before the intervention of war, even with the sales of Jock Dodds to Shamrock Rovers and Hugh O'Donnell to Rochdale. Manager Joe Smith gathered around him some of the most talented footballers in the country, and with the help of Stan Mortensen's 28 goals, the team finished the 1946–47 season in fifth position, by far the highest final position that they had achieved up to that point.

== Matthews and Mortensen: the post-war years ==
After the war, attendances at grounds across the country were booming, and Blackpool's attractive football appealed to local fans as they flocked to Bloomfield Road in their thousands. The visit of Blackburn Rovers on 26 December 1946, was the ground's first all-ticket affair.

In May and June 1947, Blackpool ventured overseas for the first time with a five-match tour of Sweden and Denmark. They opened with a 24 May draw with Malmö FF, with George Dick scoring the Seasiders' debut goal on the continent. Next, they had a three-game stand against a Stævnet (or Copenhagen XI), losing 3–1, before winning 6–1 and 5–0. The tour was brought to a close with a victory over Odense. Peter Doherty scored the only goal of the game.

During the summer of 1947, Joe Smith persuaded Stoke City to release Stanley Matthews for £11,500. The winger had fallen in love with Blackpool town and club and was eager to don the tangerine shirt again.

Other new names for 1947–48 included Joe Robinson, Albert Hobson and Walter Rickett, but the club sold Jimmy Blair to Bournemouth and long-serving goalkeeper Jock Wallace to Derby County for just £500.

In the League, Blackpool finished ninth, but they made their first-ever trip to Wembley Stadium for an FA Cup Final against Manchester United. In the final, a highly competitive game saw them finally lose 4–2 after leading 2–1 at half-time. Stan Mortensen's goal, Blackpool's second, meant that he had scored in every round, a feat rarely achieved. That evening, at 10 p.m., a "Celebration Evening" was held for the team at London's May Fair hotel.

The two teams met again at Bloomfield Road four days later in the League, with the hosts winning by a single goal.

In the final game of the season, Blackpool put seven goals past local rivals Preston North End without reply, including five from Jimmy McIntosh. McIntosh was dropped from the team seven days before the Cup Final.

In May 1948, Blackpool were invited back for a pre-season tour of Sweden and Denmark. Again they played five matches, of which they won two (against a Copenhagen Combination and AIK Stockholm), drew one (IFK Gothenburg) and lost two (both against a Copenhagen Combination).

The 1948–49 season saw Blackpool attain a sixteenth-placed League finish, although injuries to both Mortensen and the supplying Matthews meant a lack of firepower up front. Many players left the club, such as Jimmy McIntosh, Murdoch McCormack, George Farrow and Tommy Lewis. Incomers included Rex Adams from amateurs Oxford City, Willie Wardle from Grimsby Town, Ewan Fenton, Jackie Wright, and a giant of a goalkeeper from Hibernian, George Farm. Farm was only playing third-string football for the Edinburgh club when Blackpool signed him, yet he went on to become a regular in Joe Smith's starting elevens, breaking several appearance records along the way.

Blackpool finished the 1949–50 season in seventh place. A quarter-final defeat at Liverpool ended the club's FA Cup interest for another season. Blackpool's reserve team, however, won the Central League championship, scoring 82 goals in the process. They were assisted significantly by Jackie Mudie, who was just beginning to knock on the door of the first team. Other new members included the amateur Bill Slater and Bill Perry. Out went goalkeeper Joe Robinson, who was unable to win back the number-one jersey from Farm, as well as Alex Munro, who retired, and Ron Suart, who joined Blackburn.

=== 1950s ===
Blackpool's success was reflected in the crowds they were drawing, both at home and at grounds all across England. Over 70,000 attended Everton's hosting of Blackpool at Goodison Park on 7 April 1950, although they were ultimately disappointed to discover that, as was the case in the corresponding fixture a year earlier, Stanley Matthews was injured and would not be playing.

At home, over 12,000 turned up to watch Blackpool's reserves beat Burnley. Financially, the club had never been in a better position.

At this time, the club's players were paid the maximum wage of £12, which included a win bonus. Wages were to be picked up from the club office on Friday lunchtimes. The money, which was for the previous week's game, was in cash form. It was given in a small brown envelope, and each player had to sign a chitty to declare that he had received his payment.

The club undertook a pre-season tour of Switzerland in May. They played St Gallen (won 2–0), Grasshoppers (won 4–3), a Geneva-Zürich XI (won 4–0) and a Basel-Zurich XI (lost 2–0).

Another Cup Final appearance in 1951, this time against Newcastle United, almost overshadowed the fact that the team had enjoyed their most successful League season to date by finishing in third position (see Blackpool F.C. season 1950–51). Newcastle lifted the cup with a 2–0 scoreline. Both goals came from Jackie Milburn.

There had been few additions to the Blackpool squad, with the exception of Allan Brown, who signed from East Fife for £26,500, then a record transfer fee paid to a Scottish club. Brown missed the Cup Final, however, after seriously injuring himself at Huddersfield Town three weeks earlier. Offsetting the transfer fee, Ian McCall was sold to West Brom for £10,500.

Blackpool's finishing League position was assisted by a combined 47 goals from Mortensen and Mudie, with Matthews' trickery on the wing rounding out the "M" forward line.

In May 1951, Blackpool played in a mini-series of challenge matches as part of the Festival of Britain. On 14 May, they hosted Rennes at Bloomfield Road and ran out 3–0 victors.

The 1951–52 season was, by comparison, unsuccessful for Blackpool. They finished ninth in Division One, and exited the FA Cup in an "embarrassing" defeat to West Ham at the Boleyn Ground.

Ernie Taylor, who had impressed in the Cup Final, was signed from Newcastle United for £25,000, but Willie McIntosh and Bill Slater both left, to Stoke and Brentford, respectively.

Stan Mortensen scored 26 League goals, although Stanley Matthews could manage only nineteen appearances due to injury. The crowds still flocked to Bloomfield Road, however, with over 32,000 taking in a goalless draw with Arsenal during the Easter holiday.

Blackpool had a successful 1952–53 League season, finishing seventh, with over 36,000 watching the opening home game against Preston North End. New names emerging in the team at this time included Dave Durie, David Frith and the giant Roy Gratrix. Leaving Bloomfield Road were Len Stephenson and Jackie Wright. The forward line of Taylor, Mortensen, Brown and Perry provided most of the goals, but Matthews was still experiencing niggling injuries, which meant played in only half of the first-team matches.

In the FA Cup, it was third time lucky for Blackpool as they finally won the nation's primary cup competition. After trailing 3–1 to Bolton Wanderers with twenty minutes to go at Wembley, Matthews inspired a turnaround in fortunes as Blackpool triumphed 4–3, thanks to a hat-trick by Mortensen, the only such feat to have occurred in an FA Cup final. Blackpool equalised with one minute to go, and then, courtesy of Bill Perry, scored the winner in stoppage time, lifting the club to the high point of their 66-year history. Allan Brown missed his second successive Cup Final, however, after breaking his leg in scoring the winner in Blackpool's sixth-round victory over Arsenal.

Blackpool met champions Arsenal in the annual FA Charity Shield in October 1953. The Gunners won 3–1.

Now in high demand as an opponent, Blackpool visited Germany to face Essen (winning 2–1).

The following season saw another push for the elusive League Championship, but an unfruitful Christmas period, during which only five points were procured from a possible fifty, contributed to a final position of sixth. New players had been added in the form of Jim Kelly from Watford for around £15,000, and Northern Irish international Johnny McKenna from Huddersfield Town.

Leaving were John Crosland, who went to Bournemouth, George McKnight, bound for Chesterfield, and Jack Ainscough, who went into non-League football. In addition, Allan Brown was still recovering from his broken leg and also a cartilage injury, but Stan Mortensen continued to score goals.

In the FA Cup, after three third-round replays against Luton Town, Cup holders Blackpool made it past West Ham in the fourth round, only to be knocked out in the fifth at Third-Division Port Vale by a 2–0 scoreline.

A pre-season tour of Europe began in France in May 1954. To help celebrate the 35th anniversary of the Alsace Football Association, Blackpool played three friendlies. Firstly, they defeated Alsace 4–0, then followed with two draws, against 1. FC Saarbrücken and an Alsace Amateur XI.

In the 1953–54 campaign, Blackpool went out of the Cup at the third-round stage, the round in which they entered the competition, again by a 2–0 scoreline, at the hands of another third-tier team, this time York City, and at home. The result was deemed "a disaster", and without the efforts of George Farm it could have been far more humiliating for the hosts.

The League offered little respite, with a fight against relegation on their hands. With only three games remaining, Blackpool's fate appeared sealed, but a 6–1 victory at Manchester City, with Bill Perry scoring a hat-trick, went a long way to sparing them, and First Division football was ensured for another campaign.

The 1955–56 season was significant for many reasons; firstly, two of the club's greatest servants, captain Harry Johnston and Stan Mortensen, both departed to face new challenges. Johnston became manager of Reading, while Morty went to Hull City. Their places were filled by Roy Gratrix and Jackie Mudie, who switched to centre-forward, allowing Dave Durie to take over the inside-left position.

The highest-ever attendance of 38,098 at Bloomfield Road was recorded this season, when Wolverhampton Wanderers visited on 17 September 1955.

On 29 October 1955, in a 6–2 home defeat by Preston North End, George Farm became one of the few goalkeepers to score a goal. He injured a shoulder and replaced Jackie Mudie at centre-forward, where he proceeded to open the scoring with his head.

At the season's conclusion, Blackpool had attained their highest-ever League finish. They were runners-up to Manchester United, finishing eleven points behind the Red Devils and ahead of third-placed Wolves on goal average.

Gradually, the Cup-winning squad of 1953 was beginning to break up, but to Joe Smith's credit, they were replaced by new talent. A young defender, Jimmy Armfield, was demonstrating his credentials with Jim and Hughie Kelly in the half-back line. Up front, Jackie Mudie had quickly taken over the scoring mantle from Stan Mortensen, and during the 1956–57 season scored 32 goals, while Dave Durie netted twenty. Blackpool finished fourth in the table, despite scoring 93 goals.

Attendances were down significantly, with only four home games attracting over 30,000 people. This prompted the local newspaper to declare that the Blackpool public did not deserve First Division football, and unless a new, comfortable stadium was built, it could not see football being played in the town for much longer. Fans had to wait another forty years before any ground modernisation got underway.

In March 1957, Blackpool played a friendly against R.S.C. Anderlecht in Brussels. The match finished 2–2.

Also in 1956–57, there were two major departures from Bloomfield Road: Allan Brown joined Luton Town for £10,000, and Jim Kelly quit League football at the end of the season. Also at the end of the season, on 24 May, Blackpool hosted FC Barcelona in a friendly.

Barcelona was the opposition for a pre-season friendly in May 1957. Blackpool fought out a 3–3 draw with the Spanish club.

Seventh place in 1957–58 was seen by fans as another piece of evidence that the team's best days were now behind them, and with no player able to achieve the twenty-goal mark, Blackpool's challenge was fading fast.

In August, Blackpool faced Sparta in a Rotterdam friendly, winning 3–2.

On 19 October 1957, Blackpool played their 2,000th match in the Football League. It occurred against Manchester City at Bloomfield Road.

The future appeared less bleak, however, with the emergence of a new scorer in the shape of Ray Charnley at centre-forward, but there were signs that the maestro himself, Stanley Matthews, was inevitably bowing to the passing years. There were rumours that he would return to Stoke City, but at the end of the season he was still in tangerine.

On 19 April 1957, Blackpool became the first club to fly to a Football League match. Highbury was the venue for the Good Friday fixture against Arsenal.

Also at the end of the season, in April 1958, Joe Smith retired as Blackpool manager. His final game in charge was a 2–1 defeat by Tottenham Hotspur at White Hart Lane on 26 April. He had transformed Blackpool into one of the great sides of the post-war era and only ill–health prevented him continuing.

One of the club's former players, Ron Suart, took over the reins for the 1958–59 campaign, and he had the unenviable task of continuing Smith's work. A quietly spoken, deep-thinking man, Suart did not do badly in his first year in charge, guiding the team to eighth place. Ray Charnley scored twenty goals, with Jackie Mudie and Bill Perry also breaking double-figures.

In May and June 1958, Blackpool embarked on a tour of Australia. En route, they stopped in Los Angeles on 29 April to face a Los Angeles All Stars team in Inglewood. The visitors won 13–2. Their first fixture Down Under was against Australia in Sydney on 3 May. The following day they travelled to Wallsend to face a New South Wales team. On 10 May they returned to Sydney to face Australia again, before moving on to Wollongong the next day for another game against New South Wales. On 13 May, Blackpool faced a Queensland XI in Brisbane. The tour continued with games against Australia (Brisbane, 17 May), Northern Districts (Cessnock, 20 May), Australia (Adelaide, 24 May), Victoria (Melbourne, 25 May), Australia (Melbourne, 31 May), Western Australia (Perth, 2 June) and South Australia (Adelaide, 4 June). Blackpool came away from the twelve-game Australian leg with a 100% record. This record was maintained after their two games against in Hong Kong against a Hong Kong XI (8 June) and a Combined Chinese XI (10 June). Both fixtures were played at the Government Stadium in front of 28,000 fans. Blackpool scored 93 goals and conceded 13. The sixteen Blackpool players (goals scored) who partook in the tour were Jimmy Armfield (2), Ray Charnley (28), George Farm, Ewan Fenton (1), Tommy Garrett, Roy Gratrix (1), Jimmy Hagan (21), Peter Hauser (4), Hughie Kelly (4), Jimmy Kelly (2), Barrie Martin, Stanley Matthews (4), Bill Perry (14), Brian Snowdon, Malcolm Starkey (11) and Jackie Wright (1). New manager Ron Suart did not make the trip, preferring instead to learn the ropes at Bloomfield Road.

Blackpool reached the sixth round of the 1958–59 FA Cup, going out to eventual finalists Luton Town, with former Blackpool man Allan Brown netting the only goal. Also, Ernie Taylor said farewell to the seaside by joining Manchester United in the wake of the Munich air disaster.

The following season saw many changes in playing personnel, with Ewan Fenton, Jackie Wright and George Farm all departing Bloomfield Road. In came junior Bruce Crawford, Arthur Kay from Barnsley, local schoolboy "Mandy" Hill, and goalkeeper Tony Waiters from Macclesfield, who later played for England.

Ray Charnley kept on finding the back of the net, eighteen this season, and Stanley Matthews kept defying his age by turning out regularly, indeed now enjoying a new partnership with Charnley. The team as a whole, however, failed to make any impact on the Championship, and their eleventh place was to be the last time that Blackpool finished in the top half of the First Division.

At the end of the season, the club embarked on a tour of Nigeria, Ghana and Rhodesia. They won seven of the eight games played. The tour began on 4 May, with a game against a Kumasi XI, and finished with a fixture against Nyasaland on the 31st. The six games in between were against Nigeria, a Northern Nigeria XI, the Black Star Group i.e. the Ghana national team (lost), Northern Rhodesia and two matches against Southern Rhodesia.

Blackpool won only one of their first thirteen League games of the 1960–61 season. Relegation looked highly probable until they picked up six points in the last four matches, lifting the club into twentieth place and eventual safety, with Preston North End and Newcastle making the drop. After 440 games for the club, Stanley Matthews made his final appearance in a Blackpool shirt on 7 October 1961, in a 3–0 defeat at Arsenal, before returning to Stoke City.

There had been many changes, with Hugh Kelly, Brian Snowdon and Peter Smethurst, a South African import who did not make the grade, all leaving. No less than eight players made their debuts for the club this season, amongst them Glyn James, a future Wales international; Gordon West, who shared goalkeeping duties with Tony Waiters; Ray Parry; and Leslie Lea.

Ron Suart's tenure as manager looked in some danger. The Blackpool fans had now turned on him, especially after a 6–2 defeat at Second Division Scunthorpe United in the FA Cup. A home attendance fell below 10,000 for the first time in over fifteen years, the visit of Leicester City on 17 December 1960. Suart rode out the storm, however, and continued to rebuild the side as he saw fit.

Blackpool became one of the first clubs in Europe to sign a player from Asia. Cheung Chi Doy joined from Hong Kong's Tung Wah F.C., becoming the first Chinese player in the Football League. Chi Doy scored his first goal for the club against Sheffield Wednesday on 25 November 1961.

The new League Cup competition provided little interest as Blackpool lost a replay to Leeds United at Bloomfield Road.

The final proof that the golden days had ended for Blackpool Football Club came during the 1961–62 season, when Stanley Matthews returned to Stoke after fourteen years on the Lancashire coast. Despite the loss, Blackpool finished the season thirteenth. They also reached the semi-finals of the League Cup, in which they were beaten by Norwich City over two legs. The competition was still very much in its infancy, however; indeed there was no Wembley final to look forwards to.

Ray Charnley scored thirty goals, and Graham Oates made his debut, but overall it was a quite undramatic campaign.
