= List of Blackpool F.C. seasons =

As of 3 May 2025

A graph displaying Blackpool's finishing positions in the Football League from 1896 to the present.

This is a record of every completed season of Blackpool Football Club in English and European football, from 1896 to 1897, their first season in the Football League, to their current campaign. It details the club's achievements in major competitions and the top scorers in the League for each season.

Note: The 1945–46 post-War season statistics are not recognised officially.

== Seasons ==
Season	League									FA Cup	EFL Cup (Note: The EFL Cup was first contested in the 1960–61 season.)	EFL Trophy (Note: The EFL Trophy was first contested in the 1983–84 season.)	Other		Top scorer(s) (Note: League goals only.)	
Season	Division	Pld	W	D	L	GF	GA	Pts	Pos	FA Cup	EFL Cup	EFL Trophy	Other		Top scorer(s)	
1889–90	Lancs	24	10	6	8	61	46	26	5th	—						
1890–91	Lancs	20	14	2	4	62	39	30	2nd	—						
1891–92	Lancs	22	16	3	3	74	32	35	2nd	R1						
1892–93	Lancs	22	17	2	3	82	31	36	2nd	R1						
1893–94	Lancs	22	15	3	4	73	32	33	1st	—						
1894–95	Lancs	26	16	2	8	89	34	34	2nd	—						
1895–96	Lancs	30	11	6	13	65	50	28	13th	R2						
1896–97	Div 2	30	13	5	12	59	56	31	8th	QR5					Jack Parkinson	15
1897–98	Div 2	30	10	5	15	49	61	25	11th	—					Jack Cox	12
1898–99	Div 2	34	8	4	22	49	90	20	16th	—					Bob Birkett	15
1899–1900	Lancs	28	16	6	6	79	36	38	3rd	—						
1900–01	Div 2	34	12	7	15	33	58	31	12th	—					Bob Birkett	10
1901–02	Div 2	34	11	7	16	40	56	29	13th	—					Geordie Anderson	12
1902–03	Div 2	34	9	10	15	44	59	28	14th	—					Walter Cookson; Geordie Anderson	8
1903–04	Div 2	34	11	5	18	40	67	27	15th	—					Charles Bennett	9
1904–05	Div 2	34	9	10	15	36	48	28	15th	INT					Edgar Chadwick	8
1905–06	Div 2	38	10	9	19	37	62	29	14th	R3					Jimmy Connor; Harry Hancock; E. Francis	6
1906–07	Div 2	38	11	11	16	33	51	33	13th	R1					William Grundy	8
1907–08	Div 2	38	11	9	18	51	58	31	15th	R1					Bob Whittingham	15
1908–09	Div 2	38	9	11	18	46	68	29	20th	R2					Bob Whittingham	13
1909–10	Div 2	38	14	8	16	50	52	36	12th	R1					Walter Miller	14
1910–11	Div 2	38	16	10	12	49	38	42	7th	R1					Joe Clennell	18
1911–12	Div 2	38	13	8	17	32	52	34	14th	R2					Arthur Wolstenholme	9
1912–13	Div 2	38	9	8	21	39	69	26	20th	R1					George Wilson	10
1913–14	Div 2	38	9	14	15	33	44	32	16th	R1					Joe Lane	11
1914–15	Div 2	38	17	5	16	58	57	39	10th	R1					Joe Lane	28
No competitive football was played between 1915 and 1919 due to the First World War
1919–20	Div 2	42	21	10	11	65	47	52	4th	R2					Joe Lane	26
1920–21	Div 2	42	20	10	12	54	42	50	4th	R2					Jimmy Heathcote	18
1921–22	Div 2	42	15	5	22	44	57	35	19th	R1					Harry Bedford	11
1922–23	Div 2	42	18	11	13	60	43	47	5th	R1					Harry Bedford	32
1923–24	Div 2	42	18	13	11	72	47	49	4th	R2					Harry Bedford	32
1924–25	Div 2	42	14	9	19	65	61	37	17th	QF					Harry Bedford	24
1925–26	Div 2	42	17	11	14	76	69	45	6th	R3					Bert Fishwick	19
1926–27	Div 2	42	18	8	16	95	80	44	9th	R3					Billy Tremelling	30
1927–28	Div 2	42	13	8	21	83	101	34	19th	R3					Jimmy Hampson	31
1928–29	Div 2	42	19	7	16	92	76	45	8th	R3					Jimmy Hampson	40
1929–30	Div 2 ↑	42	27	4	11	98	67	58	1st	R4					Jimmy Hampson	45
1930–31	Div 1	42	11	10	21	71	125	32	20th	R4					Jimmy Hampson	32
1931–32	Div 1	42	12	9	21	65	102	33	20th	R3					Jimmy Hampson	23
1932–33	Div 1 ↓	42	14	5	23	69	85	33	22nd	R5					Jimmy Hampson	18
1933–34	Div 2	42	15	13	14	62	64	43	11th	R4					Jimmy Hampson	13
1934–35	Div 2	42	21	11	10	79	57	53	4th	R3					Jimmy Hampson	20
1935–36	Div 2	42	18	7	17	93	72	43	10th	R4					Bobby Finan	34
1936–37	Div 2 ↑	42	24	7	11	88	53	55	2nd	R3					Bobby Finan	28
1937–38	Div 1	42	16	8	18	61	66	40	12th	R4					Bobby Finan; Willie Buchan	12
1938–39	Div 1	42	12	14	16	56	68	38	15th	R3					Willie Buchan; Jock Dodds	10
1939–40	Div 1	3	3	0	0	5	2	6	— (Note: The 1939–40 season was abandoned due to the outbreak of the Second World War. Regional competitions were implemented during this time.)	—						
No competitive football was played between 1939 and 1945 due to the Second World War
1945–46	FL N (Note: The 1945–46 post-War season statistics are not recognised officially.)	42	18	9	15	94	92	45	9th	R4					Stan Mortensen	35
1946–47	Div 1	42	22	6	14	71	70	50	5th	R3					Stan Mortensen	28
1947–48	Div 1	42	17	10	15	57	41	44	9th	RU					Stan Mortensen	21
1948–49	Div 1	42	11	16	15	54	67	38	16th	R4					Stan Mortensen	18
1949–50	Div 1	42	17	15	10	46	35	49	7th	QF					Stan Mortensen	22
1950–51	Div 1	42	20	10	12	79	53	50	3rd	RU					Stan Mortensen	30
1951–52	Div 1	42	18	9	15	64	64	45	9th	R3					Stan Mortensen	26
1952–53	Div 1	42	19	9	14	71	70	47	7th	W					Stan Mortensen; Allan Brown	15
1953–54	Div 1	42	19	10	13	80	69	48	6th	R5					Stan Mortensen	21
1954–55	Div 1	42	14	10	18	60	64	38	19th	R3					Stan Mortensen	11
1955–56	Div 1	42	20	9	13	86	62	49	2nd (Note: Highest-ever League finish.)	R3					Jackie Mudie	22
1956–57	Div 1	42	22	9	11	93	65	53	4th	R5					Jackie Mudie	32
1957–58	Div 1	42	19	6	17	80	67	44	7th	R3					Jackie Mudie; Bill Perry	18
1958–59	Div 1	42	18	11	13	66	49	47	8th	QF					Ray Charnley	20
1959–60	Div 1	42	15	10	17	59	71	40	11th	R4					Ray Charnley	18
1960–61	Div 1	42	12	9	21	68	73	33	20th	R3	R2				Ray Charnley	27
1961–62	Div 1	42	15	11	16	70	75	41	13th	R3	SF				Ray Charnley	30
1962–63	Div 1	42	13	14	15	58	64	40	13th	R3	R2				Ray Charnley	22
1963–64	Div 1	42	13	9	20	52	73	35	18th	R3	R3				Alan Ball Jr.	13
1964–65	Div 1	42	12	11	19	67	78	35	17th	R3	R3				Ray Charnley	21
1965–66	Div 1	42	14	9	19	55	65	37	13th	R3	R3				Alan Ball Jr. Ray Charnley	16
1966–67	Div 1 ↓	42	6	9	27	41	76	21	22nd	R3	QF				Ray Charnley	14
1967–68	Div 2	42	24	10	8	71	43	58	3rd	R4	R3				Gerry Ingram; Alan Skirton	17
1968–69	Div 2	42	14	15	13	51	41	43	8th	R3	QF				Alan Suddick	12
1969–70	Div 2 ↑	42	20	13	9	56	45	53	2nd	R4	R3				Fred Pickering	17
1970–71	Div 1 ↓	42	4	15	23	34	66	23	22nd	R4	R3		Anglo-Italian Cup	W	Micky Burns	10
1971–72	Div 2	42	20	7	15	70	50	47	6th	R3	QF				Micky Burns	17
1972–73	Div 2	42	18	10	14	56	51	46	7th	R3	QF				Alan Ainscow; Alan Suddick	10
1973–74	Div 2	42	17	13	12	57	40	47	5th	R3	R2				Micky Burns	14
1974–75	Div 2	42	14	17	11	38	33	45	7th	R3	R2				Mickey Walsh	12
1975–76	Div 2	42	14	14	14	40	49	42	10th	R4	R2		Anglo-Scottish Cup	GS	Mickey Walsh	17
1976–77	Div 2	42	17	17	8	58	42	51	5th	R3	R3		Anglo-Scottish Cup	GS	Mickey Walsh	26
1977–78	Div 2 ↓	42	12	13	17	59	60	37	20th	R3	R2		Anglo-Scottish Cup	GS	Bob Hatton	22
1978–79	Div 3	46	18	9	19	61	59	45	12th	R2	R3		Anglo-Scottish Cup	GS	Derek Spence	16
1979–80	Div 3	46	15	11	20	62	74	41	18th	R1	R2				Tony Kellow; Stan McEwan	12
1980–81	Div 3 ↓	46	9	14	23	45	75	32	23rd	R2	R2				Colin Morris	12
1981–82	Div 4	46	15	13	18	66	60	58 (Note: The 1981–82 season saw the introduction of three points for a win.)	12th	R4	R1				Dave Bamber	15
1982–83	Div 4	46	13	12	21	55	74	49 (Note: Deducted two points for fielding an ineligible player.)	21st (Note: Lowest-ever League finish.)	R3	R3				Dave Bamber	10
1983–84	Div 4	46	21	9	16	70	52	72	6th	R4	R1	R1(N)			Paul Stewart	10
1984–85	Div 4 ↑	46	24	14	8	73	39	86	2nd	R1	R2	R1(N)			Kevin Stonehouse	11
1985–86	Div 3	46	17	12	17	66	55	63	12th	R2	R1	PR(N)			Eamon O'Keefe	17
1986–87	Div 3	46	16	16	14	74	59	64	9th	R1	R1	PR(N)			Paul Stewart	21
1987–88	Div 3	46	17	14	15	71	62	65	10th	R4	R2	PR(N)			Mark Taylor	21
1988–89	Div 3	46	14	13	19	56	59	55	19th	R3	R3	F(N)			Andy Garner	11
1989–90	Div 3 ↓	46	10	16	20	49	73	46	23rd	R5	R3	R1(N)			Andy Garner	8
1990–91	Div 4	46	23	10	13	78	47	79	5th	R3	R1	QF(N)	League play-offs	RU	Dave Bamber	17
1991–92	Div 4 ↑	42 (Note: The two Football League matches against Aldershot in 1991–92 were expunged from the record books when Aldershot went out of business that season.)	22	10	10	71	45	76	4th	R2	R2	R1(N)	League play-offs	W	Dave Bamber	28
1992–93	Div 2 (Note: After formation of the Premier League, the Football League restructured and Division Three became Division Two.)	46	12	15	19	63	75	51	18th	R1	R2	R2(N)			David Eyres	16
1993–94	Div 2	46	16	5	25	63	75	53	20th	R1	R3	R1(N)			Andy Watson	20
1994–95	Div 2	46	18	10	18	64	70	64	12th	R1	R1	R1(N)			Tony Ellis	17
1995–96	Div 2	46	23	13	10	67	40	82	3rd	R3	R1	QF(N)	League play-offs	SF	Tony Ellis; Andy Preece	14
1996–97	Div 2	46	18	15	13	60	47	69	7th	R2	R2	QF(N)			Tony Ellis	15
1997–98	Div 2	46	17	11	18	59	67	62	12th	R2	R2	SF(N)			Phil Clarkson	13
1998–99	Div 2	46	14	14	18	44	54	56	14th	R1	R2	R1(N)			Phil Clarkson	9
1999–2000	Div 2 ↓	46	8	17	21	49	77	41	22nd	R3	R1	QF(N)			John Murphy	10
2000–01	Div 3 ↑	46	22	6	18	74	58	72	7th	R2	R2	R2(N)	League play-offs	W	John Murphy	18
2001–02	Div 2	46	14	14	18	66	69	56	16th	R3	R2	W			John Murphy; Brett Ormerod	13
2002–03	Div 2	46	15	13	18	56	64	58	13th	R3	R1	R2(N)			John Murphy	16
2003–04	Div 2	46	16	11	19	58	65	59	14th	R3	R3	W			Scott Taylor	16
2004–05	Lge 1 (Note: Divisions One, Two and Three were renamed Football League Championship, Football League One and Football League Two, respectively.)	46	15	12	19	54	59	57	16th	R3	R1	QF(N)			Scott Taylor	12
2005–06	Lge 1	46	12	17	17	56	64	53	19th	R1	R2	R2(N)			Keigan Parker	12
2006–07	Lge 1 ↑	46	24	11	11	76	49	83	3rd	R4	R1	R2(N)	League play-offs	W	Andy Morrell	16
2007–08	Champ	46	12	18	16	59	64	54	19th	R3	R4	—			Ben Burgess	9
2008–09	Champ	46	13	17	16	47	58	56	16th	R3	R1	—			DJ Campbell	9
2009–10	Champ ↑	46	19	13	14	74	58	70	6th	R3	R3	—	League play-offs	W	Charlie Adam	16
2010–11	Prem ↓	38	10	9	19	55	78	39	19th	R3	R2	—			DJ Campbell	13
2011–12	Champ	46	20	15	11	79	59	75	5th	R5	R1	—	League play-offs	RU	Kevin Phillips	16
2012–13	Champ	46	14	17	15	62	63	59	15th	R3	R1	—			Tom Ince	18
2013–14	Champ	46	11	13	22	38	66	46	20th	R3	R1	—			Tom Ince	7
2014–15	Champ ↓	46	4	14	28	36	91	26	24th	R3	R1	—			Andrea Orlandi	4
2015–16	Lge 1 ↓	46	12	10	24	40	63	46	22nd	R1	R1	QF(N)			Mark Cullen	9
2016–17	Lge 2 ↑	46	18	16	12	69	46	70	7th	R4	R2	R3	League play-offs	W	Mark Cullen	13
2017–18	Lge 1	46	15	15	16	60	55	60	12th	R1	R1	R3			Kyle Vassell	11
2018–19	Lge 1	46	15	17	14	50	52	62	10th	R3	R4	GS			Armand Gnanduillet	10
2019–20	Lge 1	35	11	12	12	44	43	45	13th (Note: The 2019–20 season was curtailed due to the COVID-19 pandemic, with league positions decided on a points-per-game basis. Blackpool averaged 1.29 points from 35 games.)	R3	R1	R2			Armand Gnanduillet	15
2020–21	Lge 1 ↑	46	23	11	12	60	37	80	3rd	R4	R1	R2	League play-offs	W	Jerry Yates	20
2021–22	Champ	46	16	12	18	54	58	60	16th	R3	R2	—			Shayne Lavery	10
2022–23	Champ ↓	46	11	11	24	48	72	44	23rd	R4	R1	—			Jerry Yates	15
2023–24	Lge 1	46	21	10	15	65	84	73	8th	R3	R2	SF			Jordan Rhodes	15
2024–25	Lge 1	46	17	16	13	72	60	67	9th	R2	R3	R2			Sonny Carey; Ashley Fletcher	11
2025–26	Lge 1	46	17	9	20	54	65	60	13th	R3	R1	R1			Ashley Fletcher	15

== Key ==
- Pld – Matches played
- W – Matches won
- D – Matches drawn
- L – Matches lost
- GF – Goals for
- GA – Goals against
- Pts – Points
- Pos – Final position
- Prem – Premier League
- Champ – EFL Championship
- Lge 1 – EFL League One
- Lge 2 – EFL League Two
- Div 1 – Football League First Division
- Div 2 – Football League Second Division
- Div 3 – Football League Third Division
- Div 4 – Football League Fourth Division
- FL N – Football League North
- Lancs – Lancashire League
- n/a – Not applicable
- QR – Qualifying round
- PR – Preliminary round
- INT – Intermediate round
- GS – Group stage
- R1 – First round
- R2 – Second round
- R3 – Third round
- R4 – Fourth round
- R5 – Fifth round
- QF – Quarter-finals
- SF – Semi-finals
- F – Regional final
- RU – Runners-up
- W – Winners
- (N) – Northern section of regionalised stage

Champions	Runners-up	Promoted ↑	Relegated ↓
