= Louis Cardwell =

English footballer

Personal information
- Full name: Louis Cardwell
- Date of birth: 20 August 1912
- Place of birth: Blackpool, England
- Date of death: 23 April 1986 (aged 73)
- Place of death: Blackpool, England
- Height: 5 ft 11 in (1.80 m)
- Position: Centre-half

Senior career*
Years	Team	Apps	(Gls)
- South Shore
- Imperial Hydro
1931–1937	Blackpool	131	(6)
1937–1946	Manchester City	39	(0)
1946	→ Netherfield (loan)		
1947–1949	Crewe Alexandra	25	(0)
Total		195	(6)
- * Club domestic league appearances and goals

Louis Cardwell (20 August 1912 – 23 April 1986) was an English professional footballer. A centre-half, he spent six years at Blackpool in the 1930s, making over 100 the Football League appearances for the club, and helping them to win promotion out of the Second Division in 1936–37. He later played for Manchester City, Netherfield, and Crewe Alexandra.

== Career ==
=== Blackpool ===
After starting his career with South Shore and Imperial Hydro, Cardwell made his debut for Blackpool on 17 January 1931, in a 5–1 defeat at Middlesbrough. It was his only league appearance of the 1930–31 season; he did, however, appear in the club's two FA Cup ties. He missed the entire 1931–32 campaign due to injury and only returned with ten games of the following 1932–33 season remaining, appearing in six of them. Sandy MacFarlane succeeded Harry Evans as Blackpool manager before the 1933–34 season, and the Scot only gave one start to Cardwell, in a 3–0 Boxing Day defeat at Hull City. The following season, however, he selected him in 29 of the club's 42 league games.

Cardwell served under his third Blackpool manager (this time Joe Smith) for the 1935–36 term, and he went on to be ever-present for the season. He also scored five goals. The first three came in consecutive games: against Bradford City on 7 March, Plymouth Argyle a week later, and then against Barnsley on 21 March. The remaining two were both from the penalty spot: against Hull City on 11 April and against Newcastle United on 22 April, in the penultimate game of the league campaign.

Cardwell was also ever-present the following season, 1936–37, as Blackpool were promoted to the First Division as runners-up of the Second Division. In 1937–38, Cardwell started in eleven of the first twelve league games (and scored in one of them) before being sold to Manchester City. His final game for the "Seasiders" came on 16 October, a 2–0 defeat to Chelsea at Bloomfield Road.

=== Manchester City and beyond ===
Cardwell played 39 League games for Manchester City. The "Citizens" were relegated out of the top-flight in 1937–38, and finished fifth in the Second Division in 1938–39 – they were five points behind promoted Sheffield United.

He joined Port Vale as a wartime guest in January 1945, making his debut in a 5–0 defeat at Wrexham on 20 January. He scored one goal in seven further games before departing in March 1945. He also guested for Blackpool, Fulham, Millwall, Portsmouth and West Ham United.

Cardwell moved on loan to Netherfield and then left Maine Road permanently on a transfer to Crewe Alexandra in 1947. The "Railwaymen" finished tenth and 12th in the Third Division North in 1947–48 and 1948–49 under the stewardship of Frank Hill and Arthur Turner. He played 25 league games during his two seasons at Gresty Road.

== Career statistics ==
Appearances and goals by club, season and competition
Club	Season	League			FA Cup		Total	
Club	Season	Division	Apps	Goals	Apps	Goals	Apps	Goals
Blackpool	1930–31	First Division	1	0	2	0	3	0
Blackpool	1931–32	First Division	0	0	0	0	0	0
Blackpool	1932–33	First Division	5	0	0	0	5	0
Blackpool	1933–34	Second Division	1	0	0	0	1	0
Blackpool	1934–35	Second Division	29	0	1	0	30	0
Blackpool	1935–36	Second Division	42	5	2	0	47	5
Blackpool	1936–37	Second Division	42	0	2	0	44	0
Blackpool	1937–38	First Division	11	1	0	0	11	1
Blackpool	Total		131	6	7	0	138	6
Manchester City	1938–39	Second Division	37	0	2	0	39	0
Manchester City	1945–46		0	0	4	0	4	0
Manchester City	1946–47	Second Division	2	0	0	0	2	0
Manchester City	Total		39	0	6	0	45	0
Crewe Alexandra	1947–48	Third Division North	20	0	4	0	24	0
Crewe Alexandra	1948–49	Third Division North	5	0	0	0	5	0
Crewe Alexandra	Total		25	0	4	0	29	0
Career total			195	6	17	0	212	6

== Honours ==
Blackpool

- Football League Second Division second-place promotion: 1936–37
