= William Grant (footballer) =

Scottish footballer

Personal information
- Full name: William Middleton Grant
- Date of birth: 14 November 1904
- Place of birth: Bo'ness, Scotland
- Date of death: 23 September 1994 (aged 89)
- Place of death: Bo'ness, Scotland
- Position: Defender

Youth career
- Bo'ness

Senior career*
Years	Team	Apps	(Gls)
1925–1927	East Stirlingshire	56	(1)
1927–1935	Blackpool	220	(0)
1935–1939	Motherwell	100	(1)
Total		376	(2)
- * Club domestic league appearances and goals

William Middleton Grant (14 November 1904 – 23 September 1994) was a Scottish professional footballer. He spent eight years at Blackpool, making over 200 Football League appearances for the club. He played as a defender.

== Career ==
Grant, who had been signed from Scottish club East Stirlingshire for a then record fee of £1600 for a second division player, made his debut for Blackpool eighteen games into their 1927–28 league season, a 2–2 draw at South Shields on 10 December 1927. He went on to make seventeen further league appearances that campaign, and one in the FA Cup. The following season, 1928–29, Grant made 27 league appearances. This was under a new manager, Harry Evans, who succeeded Sydney Beaumont.

Grant appeared in all but two of Blackpool's league games as captain in 1929–30 as the club won the Division Two championship. Only Jimmy Hampson appeared in more games than he did. In 1930–31, Blackpool's first season in English football's top flight, Grant was ever-present in the club's 42 league games — the only player at the club to claim such an achievement that particular season. He achieved the same feat the following season, 1931–32, sharing the honour with Hampson. 1932–33 saw Grant's appearances limited, with only eighteen in the league to his name, as Blackpool returned to Division Two. He did, however, appear in the club's FA Cup fifth-round defeat at Sunderland in February 1933.

Sandy MacFarlane was appointed as Blackpool manager for the 1933–34 term, and Grant found himself surplus to requirements, making just five league starts. He was given more chances in 1934–35 (28 appearances), but this proved to be his (and MacFarlane's) last season with the club. His 220th and final league appearance for Blackpool occurred on 4 May 1935, in a final-day 1–1 draw with Bolton Wanderers at Bloomfield Road.

He finished his career back in his native land with Motherwell, playing right back in an 8–0 win against Celtic on 30 April 1937, to date Celtic's biggest ever defeat. He continued to play there until he retired in 1939. He then worked as a miner for many years in various pits around is home town of Bo'ness.
