= Phil Watson (footballer) =

Scottish footballer (1907–1990)

Personal information
- Full name: Philip Ross Watson
- Date of birth: 23 February 1907
- Place of birth: Shotts, Scotland
- Date of death: 1990 (aged 82–83)
- Height: 5 ft 9 1/2 in (1.77 m)
- Position: Centre half

Senior career*
Years	Team	Apps	(Gls)
- Wishaw Juniors
1927–1932	Hamilton Academical	173	(6)
1932–1937	Blackpool	171	(11)
1937–1938	Barnsley	4	(0)
1938–1939	Queen of the South	23	(0)
Total		371	(17)

International career
1933	Scotland	1	(0)
1930	Scottish Football League XI	1	(0)
- * Club domestic league appearances and goals

Philip Ross Watson (23 February 1907 – 1990) was a Scottish professional footballer. He made one appearance for the Scotland national team. He played as a centre half.

== Club career ==
=== Hamilton Academical ===
Watson began his senior career in his native Scotland in 1927 with Hamilton Academical.

=== Blackpool ===
In 1932, he moved south to join Blackpool. He made his debut for the Lancashire club on 13 February 1932, in a 2–0 victory over Everton at Bloomfield Road. He came into a defence which had leaked seven goals at Manchester City a week earlier.

He made a further fourteen league appearances in the 1931–32 season, scoring one goal – in a 2–2 draw at home to Liverpool on 5 March. The previous month, he marked Everton's Dixie Dean out of the game, and the Toffees player congratulated him at the final whistle as Jimmy Hampson's brace gave Blackpool a 2–0 win.

The following season, 1932–33, he was an ever-present in the club's 45 league and cup games. He scored seven league goals, including a hat-trick against Aston Villa at Bloomfield Road on 18 March 1933. He was deputising in the forward line for the injured Jimmy Hampson. Despite his contributions, Blackpool finished bottom of Division One and were relegated.

Another ever-present season followed in 1933–34. He scored one league goal and one FA Cup goal.

His run of 129 consecutive games for Blackpool ended midway through the 1934–35 campaign, in which he made 34 appearances and scored two goals. After the signing of centre-half Louis Cardwell, Watson moved to the right-back position. He appeared in the forward line again for two games, alongside Bobby Finan firstly, then Peter Doherty.

Watson continued at right-back for the 1935–36 season, making 35 league appearances. He missed the entire 1936–37 season through injury, but returned to the team in 1937–38, his final one as a Blackpool player, back in the centre-half position.

Watson's 178th and final appearance for Blackpool occurred on 13 November 1937, in a 3–0 home defeat at the hands of Birmingham City.

=== Barnsley ===
Barnsley became his third club, but he only made four league appearances for the Tykes before returning to Scotland to finish his career with Queen of the South.

=== Queen of the South ===
Signed by Willie Ferguson in 1938, Watson played in the final game of the 1937–38 season, a 3–2 victory against Rangers at Ibrox Park; his pass to Jackie Oakes led to Queens' first goal. This was the club's first league victory against Rangers (although they had knocked them out of the Scottish Cup the season before).

== International career ==
Watson's sole cap for Scotland came against Austria in 1933 while playing for Blackpool. He had been selected once for the Scottish Football League XI in 1930 while with Hamilton.

== Personal life ==
His father, likewise named Philip Ross Watson, was also a footballer who made over 100 appearances for Hamilton Academical. His brother Martin played in Scotland's second tier, mainly for Dumbarton.

Watson died in 1990 at the age of 83.
