= Albert Watson (footballer, born 1903) =

English footballer

Personal information
- Date of birth: 19 August 1903
- Place of birth: Felling, Gateshead, England
- Height: 5 ft 9 1/2 in (1.77 m)
- Position: Midfielder

Youth career
- 1923: Felling Colliery

Senior career*
Years	Team	Apps	(Gls)
1923–1936	Blackpool	373	(22)
1936–1937	Halifax Town	29	(2)
1937–1938	Gateshead	67	(24)
Total		469	(48)
- * Club domestic league appearances and goals

Albert Watson (born 19 August 1903) was an English professional football midfielder. He made nearly 400 league appearances for Blackpool between 1923 and 1936.

== Career ==
Watson signed for Blackpool from Felling Colliery F.C. in Felling, Gateshead, making his debut on 20 October 1923. He scored two goals in a 5–0 victory over Coventry City at Bloomfield Road and made a further 14 league appearances in the 1923–24 season, scoring another three goals.

In his second season, 1924–25, Watson made 47 league and cup appearances, missing only two games in early March 1924. He was an ever-present the following season, 1925–26, and continued to appear regularly over the next few seasons.

He won the Second Division championship in 1929–30 under the guidance of Harry Evans.

Watson's equalising goal against Manchester City seven minutes from the end of the final league game of the 1930–31 season was dubbed a "£10,000 goal": it was said to be worth at least that amount because it secured the club's Division One survival and its short-term future, with the guarantee of large attendances for the next 12 months. He also ensured himself free meals at local restaurants for the rest of his life. "I hit the ball for all it was worth," he said, after the match. "It went into the net like a bullet."

In 1931–32, Watson scored seven league goals, including two in a 7–2 demolition of West Ham at Bloomfield Road on 2 April 1932.

In 1933–34, Sandy MacFarlane's first season as Blackpool manager, Watson suffered an injury that limited his league appearances to just three games. He missed the entire 1934–35 campaign, but returned for half of the 1935–36 season, his final one with the club. His last appearance in a Blackpool shirt occurred on 13 April 1936, in a single-goal defeat at Southampton. In his 13 years at Blackpool, Watson made 390 total appearances and scored 22 goals.

His career wound down with a season each at Halifax Town and home-town club Gateshead. At the latter, he scored 24 league goals in 67 appearances.

Post-retirement, he became a scout for Blackpool.

== Honours ==
Blackpool

- Second Division championship: 1929–30
