= List of Blackpool F.C. managers =

Including repeat appointments, there have been 41 full-time managers of Blackpool F.C., the first being Bill Norman between 1918 and 1923. The longest-serving manager was Joe Smith, who occupied the role for 23 years; Michael Appleton, meanwhile, lasted 65 days in the role in his first stint at the club. Blackpool have, on average, appointed a new manager just under every three years. As of October 2025, the club have had fourteen full-time managers in thirteen years.

There have been five repeat appointments: Bob Stokoe, Allan Brown, Simon Grayson, Michael Appleton and Neil Critchley.

In 2014, Jose Riga became the club's first foreign manager.

In 2020, Neil Critchley became the first appointment to be known as a head coach.

== List of managers ==
The statistics in the table below account for Football League and Premier League games only. Play-off games are excluded.

As of 21 October 2025

Name	From	To	Games	Won	Drawn	Lost	Win%	Honours won
No manager	1896	1903	196	63	38	95	32.14
Tom Barcroft^{1} (secretary-manager)	1903	1909	220	61	55	104	27.73
Jack Cox^{1} (player-manager)	1909	1911	76	30	18	28	39.47
No manager	1911	1915	152	48	35	69	31.58
Bill Norman^{2}	c. 1 August 1918	c. 31 May 1923	168	74	36	58	44.05
No manager	c. 31 May 1923	5 October 1923	8	1	5	2	12.50
Major Frank Buckley	6 October 1923	c. 31 May 1927	160	66	36	58	41.25
Sydney Beaumont	c. 1 August 1927	c. 31 May 1928	42	13	8	21	30.95
Harry Evans (honorary manager)	c. 1 August 1928	c. 31 May 1933	210	83	35	92	39.52	Division Two championship (1929–30)
Sandy MacFarlane	1 July 1933	31 July 1935	84	36	24	24	42.86
Joe Smith	c. 1 August 1935	30 April 1958	672	288	155	229	42.86	Promotion to Division One (1936–37), FA Cup (1953)
Ron Suart^{1}	1 May 1958	1 February 1967	363	116	91	156	31.96
Stan Mortensen^{1}	1 February 1967	April 1969	99	40	27	32	40.40
Harry Johnston (caretaker manager)	April 1969	April 1969	?	?	?	?	??.??
Les Shannon	1 May 1969	26 October 1970	56	22	17	17	39.29	Promotion to Division One (1969–70)
Jimmy Meadows (caretaker manager)	26 October 1970	20 December 1970	8	1	1	6	12.50
Bob Stokoe	20 December 1970	23 November 1972	80	28	24	28	35.00	1971 Anglo-Italian Cup
No manager	23 November 1972	1 January 1973	7	4	0	3	57.14
Harry Potts	1 January 1973	5 May 1976	143	52	47	44	36.36
Allan Brown^{1}	5 May 1976	6 February 1978	69	28	23	18	40.58
Bobby Smith (caretaker manager)	6 February 1978	7 March 1978	2	0	1	1	00.00
Jimmy Meadows (caretaker manager)	7 March 1978	20 May 1978	13	1	6	6	07.69
Bob Stokoe (second time)	20 May 1978	17 August 1979	46	18	9	19	39.13
Stan Ternent	19 September 1979	1 February 1980	29	9	7	13	31.03
Freddie Scott (caretaker manager)	February 1980	February 1980	?	?	?	?	??.??
Alan Ball^{1}	February 1980	28 February 1981	51	13	14	24	25.49
Allan Brown^{1} (second time)	1 March 1981	31 May 1982	58	17	17	24	29.31
Sam Ellis	1 June 1982	28 March 1989	311	117	89	105	37.62	Promotion to Division Three (1984–85)
Jimmy Mullen (caretaker manager)	28 March 1989	20 May 1989	11	5	1	5	45.45
Jimmy Mullen	20 May 1989	30 April 1990	45	10	16	19	22.22
Tom White^{1} (caretaker manager)	30 April 1990	11 June 1990	1	0	0	1	00.00
Graham Carr	11 June 1990	30 November 1990	16	5	3	8	31.25
Billy Ayre	30 November 1990	10 June 1994	164	68	37	59	41.46	Promotion to (new) Division Two (1991–92)
Sam Allardyce	19 July 1994	29 May 1996	92	41	23	28	44.57
Gary Megson	5 July 1996	1 July 1997	46	18	15	13	39.13
Nigel Worthington^{1}	8 July 1997	23 December 1999	113	34	32	47	30.09
Mike Hennigan & Mike Davies^{1} (caretaker managers)	23 December 1999	7 January 2000	3	0	1	2	00.00
Steve McMahon	7 January 2000	6 June 2004	206	72	53	81	34.95	Promotion to Division Two (2000–01), League Trophy (2002 and 2004)
Colin Hendry^{1}	7 June 2004	10 November 2005	62	18	19	25	29.03
Simon Grayson^{1} (caretaker manager)	10 November 2005	5 June 2006	30	9	10	11	30.00
Simon Grayson^{1}	5 August 2006	23 December 2008	116	43	37	36	37.06	Promotion to The Championship (2006–07)
Tony Parkes & Steve Thompson (caretaker managers)	24 December 2008	18 May 2009	22	6	9	7	27.27
Ian Holloway	21 May 2009	3 November 2012	143	54	40	49	37.76	Promotion to the Premier League (2009–10)
Steve Thompson (caretaker manager)	3 November 2012	7 November 2012	2	1	0	1	50
Michael Appleton	7 November 2012	11 January 2013	11	2	7	2	18.18
Steve Thompson (caretaker manager)	11 January 2013	18 February 2013	6	2	0	4	33.33
Paul Ince	18 February 2013	21 January 2014	40	12	15	13	30
Barry Ferguson^{1} (caretaker manager)	21 January 2014	3 May 2014	20	3	5	12	15
José Riga	11 June 2014	27 October 2014	14	1	3	10	7.14
Lee Clark	30 October 2014	9 May 2015	32	3	11	18	9.38
Neil McDonald	2 June 2015	18 May 2016	14	4	4	6	28.57
Gary Bowyer	1 June 2016	6 August 2018	115	42	40	33	36.52	Promotion to League One (2016–17)
Terry McPhillips	6 August 2018	5 July 2019	56	21	18	17	37.50
Simon Grayson^{1}	6 July 2019	12 February 2020	29	10	9	10	34.48
David Dunn (caretaker manager)	12 February 2020	2 March 2020	4	2	1	1	50
Neil Critchley^{3}	2 March 2020	2 June 2022	94	39	24	31	41.49	Promotion to The Championship (2020–21)
Michael Appleton	17 June 2022	18 January 2023	27	6	8	13	22.22
Mick McCarthy	19 January 2023	8 April 2023	14	2	3	9	14.29
Stephen Dobbie (interim)	8 April 2023	23 May 2023	6	3	0	3	50
Neil Critchley	23 May 2023	21 August 2024	48	21	10	17	43.75
Richard Keogh (interim)	21 August 2024	3 September 2024	2	0	2	0	0
Steve Bruce	3 September 2024	4 October 2025	62	22	19	21	40
Ian Evatt	21 October 2025	19 November 2026

== Notes ==
^1 – Also played for Blackpool
^2 – Norman was the club's first full-time manager
^3 – Position known as head coach henceforth
