= Charlie Rattray =

English footballer (1911–1995)

Personal information
- Full name: Charles Robert Rattray
- Date of birth: 11 May 1911
- Place of birth: Fleetwood, England
- Date of death: 1 October 1995 (aged 84)
- Place of death: Fleetwood, England
- Height: 5 ft 6 in (1.68 m)
- Position: Right winger

Youth career
- 1928–1929: Fleetwood Windsor Villa

Senior career*
Years	Team	Apps	(Gls)
1929–1933	Blackpool	54	(9)
1934–1935	Watford	19	(0)
1936–1937	Mansfield Town	36	(5)
1937–1938	Port Vale	22	(1)
1938–1939	Accrington Stanley	19	(1)
- Fleetwood
Total		150+	(16+)
- * Club domestic league appearances and goals

Charles Robert Rattray (11 May 1911 – 1 October 1995) was an English footballer who scored 16 goals in 150 league games in a nine-year career in the Football League with Blackpool, Watford, Mansfield Town, Port Vale, and Accrington Stanley.

== Career ==
Rattray played for Fleetwood Windsor Villa, before joining Blackpool for a fee of £10. He scored one goal in nine Second Division appearances in the 1929–30 season, as the "Tangerines" won promotion as champions; his goal came in a 6–0 win over Charlton Athletic at Bloomfield Road on 22 March. After avoiding relegation by slender margins in 1930–31 and 1931–32, Blackpool dropped out of the First Division in 1932–33. He then played 19 Third Division South games in an injury-hit spell at Watford before scoring five goals in 36 Third Division North games for Mansfield Town. He joined Port Vale in May 1937. He scored one goal in 22 Third Division North appearances in the 1937–38 season. He was given a free transfer from the Old Recreation Ground in May 1938. He moved on to Accrington Stanley, scoring one goal in 19 Third Division North games. He played for Mossley as a wartime guest player in the 1939–40 season, scoring two goals in seven appearances before ending his career with hometown club Fleetwood.

== Style of play ==
Rattray was a skilful dribbling winger who was known by the nickname "Jazz" due to his tendency to "jazz around with the ball".

== Career statistics ==
Appearances and goals by club, season and competition
Club	Season	League			FA Cup		Other		Total	
Club	Season	Division	Apps	Goals	Apps	Goals	Apps	Goals	Apps	Goals
Blackpool	1929–30	Second Division	9	1	0	0	0	0	9	1
Blackpool	1930–31	First Division	19	1	2	0	0	0	21	1
Blackpool	1931–32	First Division	7	1	0	0	0	0	7	1
Blackpool	1932–33	First Division	7	0	0	0	0	0	7	0
Blackpool	1933–34	First Division	12	6	1	0	0	0	13	6
Blackpool	Total		54	9	3	0	0	0	57	9
Watford	1934–35	Third Division South	19	0	3	1	4	0	26	1
Mansfield Town	1936–37	Third Division North	36	5	2	0	1	0	39	5
Port Vale	1937–38	Third Division North	22	1	1	0	2	1	25	2
Accrington Stanley	1938–39	Third Division North	19	1	1	0	2	0	22	1
Career total			150	16	10	1	9	1	169	18

== Honours ==
Blackpool

- Football League Second Division: 1929–30
