= Sammy Jones (footballer) =

Irish footballer (1911–1993)

Personal information
- Full name: Samuel Jones
- Date of birth: 11 June 1911
- Place of birth: Lurgan, Ireland
- Date of death: 7 March 1993 (aged 81)
- Height: 5 ft 10 in (1.78 m)
- Position: Defender

Senior career*
| Years | Team | Apps | (Gls) |
| 1930–1933 | Distillery | | |
| 1933–1946 | Blackpool | 165 | (6) |

International career
| 1933–1934 | Ireland | 2 | (1) |
- * Club domestic league appearances and goals

Samuel Jones (11 June 1911 – 7 March 1993) was an Irish professional footballer who played as a defender.

== Club career ==
Born in Lurgan, Ireland, Jones began his professional career with Distillery in his native land. In 1933, he joined Sandy MacFarlane's Blackpool, making his debut on 21 October 1933, in a goalless draw against Oldham Athletic at Bloomfield Road. He made a further 21 appearances during the 1933–34 campaign, scoring one goal.

In 1934–35, he appeared in all but one of Blackpool's league games, scoring one goal in the process.

The following season, 1935–36, in Joe Smith's first season as manager, he made 37 league appearances and scored twice.

Jones was also a regular in the team during Blackpool's successful 1936–37 season, in which they finished runners-up and gained promotion to Division One.

In 1937–38, he shared the number-6 shirt with future club captain Harry Johnston, who began to knock on the door of the first team after a few years in the reserves. Jones made 24 league appearances, and Johnston 20.

In Jones' final season in League football, 1938–39, he made seven league appearances and scored two goals. He played for Blackpool throughout the World War II regional competitions, but retired before football proper resumed in 1946–47.

== International career ==
Jones received two caps for Ireland, during the 1933–34 season, and scored on his debut.

== Death ==
Jones died in his early 80s in 1993.
