= James Hamilton (footballer, born 1901) =

Scottish footballer

Personal information
- Date of birth: 16 June 1901
- Place of birth: Bargeddie, Scotland
- Date of death: 1958 (aged 56–57)
- Place of death: cambuslang
- Position: Left back

Senior career*
| Years | Team | Apps | (Gls) |
| – | Vale of Clyde | | |
| 1922–1925 | St Mirren | 80 | (0) |
| 1925–1928 | Rangers | 35 | (2) |
| 1927 | → Hull City (loan) | | |
| 1928–1930 | Blackpool | 28 | (0) |
| 1930 | Barrow | | |
| 1931 | Armadale | 5 | (0) |

International career
| 1924 | Scotland | 1 | (0) |
| 1924 | Scottish League XI | 1 | (0) |
- * Club domestic league appearances and goals

James Hamilton (16 June 1901 – 1975) was a Scottish footballer who played as a left back for Vale of Clyde, St Mirren, Rangers, Blackpool, Barrow, Armadale and Scotland. He was a full-back.

== Career ==
=== Blackpool ===
Bargeddie (Lanarkshire)-born Hamilton made his debut for Harry Evans' Blackpool at home to Bristol City on 15 September 1928, six games into their 1928–29 Football League campaign. He made a further 24 League appearances that season as the Tangerines finished eighth in Division Two.

He started the first three League games of the following 1929–30 season, which proved to be the club's first and, as of 2015, only championship that saw them promoted to the top flight for the first time. They were his final appearances for the club.
