= Billy Tremelling =

English footballer

Personal information
- Full name: William Reuben Tremelling
- Date of birth: 9 May 1905
- Place of birth: Newhall, England
- Date of death: 5 November 1961 (aged 56)
- Height: 5 ft 8 1/2 in (1.74 m)
- Positions: Centre forward; centre half

Youth career
- Shirebrook
- Kirby Colliery
- Welbeck Colliery

Senior career*
Years	Team	Apps	(Gls)
- Mansfield Town
- Retford Town
1925–1930	Blackpool	114	(43)
1930–1937	Preston North End	209	(11)
- * Club domestic league appearances and goals

William Reuben Tremelling (9 May 1905 — 5 November 1961) was an English professional footballer. He played as a forward at the beginning of his career, but was later played as a defender.

== Family ==
His brothers Dan and Sol were also footballers, as was a fourth brother, Jack. His nephew Arthur (son of Sol) was also a footballer.

== Career ==
After starting out with Shirebrook, Kirby Colliery, Welbeck Colliery, Mansfield Town, Retford Town and Worksop Town, in 1925 he joined Blackpool, then in the Second Division, with whom he spent five years.

Tremelling made his debut for Blackpool on 28 March 1925, in a goalless draw at Manchester United in front of a crowd of 30,000. He made one more league appearance in the 1924–25 season, in the very next game (a home victory over Southampton), but missed the final eight games of the season.

In 1925–26, he only appeared in three league games, after breaking his leg in a 6–1 defeat at Swansea Town on 25 February 1926.

He made a major impact in 1926–27, with 30 goals in 26 league games. He scored his first goal for Blackpool on 13 November 1926, in a 3–0 victory over Bradford City at Bloomfield Road. He went on to score in the next five games, including a hat-trick in a 6–0 home victory over Clapton Orient on 11 December. He scored another treble in a 4–2 victory at Port Vale on 16 April 1927, the second of Blackpool's two games in as many days. Tremelling also scored Blackpool's sole goal in the FA Cup that season, in a 3–1 third-round loss at home to Bolton Wanderers on 8 January 1927.

In 1927–28, Tremelling, under new Blackpool boss Sydney Beaumont, was switched to a defensive position. As such, his goal hauls dried up: he made 22 appearances and scored just four goals that season.

Tremelling was returned to the forward line for part of the 1928–29 as new manager Harry Evans struggled to find a partner for Jimmy Hampson. He scored five goals in twelve league appearances.

Back in a defensive role for the 1929–30 campaign, Tremelling helped Blackpool to the Division Two championship. He made 38 league appearances and scored three goals in the club's successful season.

Tremelling's final game for Blackpool was on 6 December 1930, in a 3–1 home defeat by West Ham United.

He left the club to join arch-rivals Preston North End, with whom he made over 200 appearances, captaining the side in the 1937 FA Cup Final.

After retirement, Tremelling returned to Blackpool as a coach.

== Honours ==
Blackpool

- Football League Second Division: 1929–30

Preston North End

- FA Cup runner-up: 1936–37

== Bibliography ==
- Calley, Roy (1992). Blackpool: A Complete Record 1887-1992. Breedon Books Sport. ISBN 1-873626-07-X.
- Joyce, Michael (2004). Football League Players' Records 1888-1939. ISBN 1-899468-67-6.
