= Philip Watson (footballer) =

Scottish footballer

Personal information
- Full name: Philip Ross Watson
- Date of birth: 29 April 1881
- Place of birth: Shotts, Scotland
- Date of death: 20 April 1953 (aged 71)
- Place of death: Shotts, Scotland
- Positions: Centre half; wing half

Senior career*
Years	Team	Apps	(Gls)
–	Shotts Hawthorn		
1901–1902	Dykehead		
1902–1903	Celtic	3	(0)
1903–1907	Ayr	52	(5)
1906–1907	→ Dykehead (loan)		
1907–1912	Hamilton Academical	120	(4)
1912–1915	Motherwell	13	(0)
1914–1915	→ Dykehead (loan)		
Total		188	(9)
- * Club domestic league appearances and goals

Philip Ross Watson (29 April 1881 – 20 April 1953) was a Scottish footballer who played as a wing half or centre half. His longest and most prominent spell was with Hamilton Academical, and he appeared in the 1911 Scottish Cup Final while with the club – this ended in defeat after a replay to Celtic, one of his former employers. He also spent time with Ayr, Motherwell and local team Dykehead, including several loans back when out of favour for a place in the side at his senior clubs.

His son of the same name, known as Phil, was also a footballer who made over 170 appearances each for Hamilton Academical and Blackpool and received one cap for Scotland. Another son Martin played in Scotland's second tier, mainly for Dumbarton.
