= 1941–42 Blackpool F.C. season =

English football club season

Blackpool F.C.
1941–42 season
- Manager: Joe Smith
- League North: 1st
- FA Cup: Competition suspended
- League War Cup: Qualifying round
- Top goalscorer: League: All: Jock Dodds (65)
Home colours

The 1941–42 season was Blackpool F.C.'s third season in special wartime football during World War II. They competed in League North, finishing first. Blackpool also won the Lancashire Cup, beating Blackburn Rovers 7–1 in the final.

Jock Dodds was the club's top scorer for the fourth consecutive season, with 65 goals in all competitions. These don't count in official statistics, however.
