= 1929–30 Blackpool F.C. season =

English football club season

Blackpool F.C.
1929–30 season
- Manager: Harry Evans
- Division Two: 1st (promoted to Division One)
- FA Cup: Fourth round
- Top goalscorer: League: Jimmy Hampson (45); All: Jimmy Hampson (46)
- Highest home attendance: 24,144 (v. Oldham Athletic)
- Lowest home attendance: 9,608 (v. Wolves)
Home colours

The 1929–30 season was Blackpool F.C.'s 29th season (26th consecutive) in the Football League. They competed in the 22-team Division Two, then the second tier of English football, finishing first, winning their only League championship to date.

Jimmy Hampson was the club's top scorer for the third consecutive season, with 46 goals in total (45 in the league and one in the FA Cup). He was also the top goal scorer in England.

== Season review ==
The league season began on 31 August with a visit to Bloomfield Road by Millwall. The hosts won 4–3, with goals from Percy Downes, Dick Neal, Jimmy Hampson and Alex Ritchie, in front of a crowd of 15,760.

Another home game followed on 2 September. Bury were the opponents on this occasion, and they returned to Gigg Lane pointless after strikes by Hampson and Downes gave Blackpool a 2–1 victory.

Hampson scored twice in a 4–2 defeat at Southampton five days later, but Blackpool returned to winning ways on 9 September with a 5–1 win against Nottingham Forest at Bloomfield Road. Billy Upton (two), Downes and Hampson (two) were the scorers for the home side.

Tottenham travelled north to Lancashire on 14 September, and they returned whence they had come with a 3–2 defeat behind them. Another double from Hampson was coupled with a strike from Upton to give the Seasiders a 3–2 victory.

Hampson scored his ninth goal in six games on 21 September, in a 5–1 defeat at West Bromwich Albion.

Blackpool finished off a busy September with a single-goal home victory over Bradford Park Avenue, with Downes netting his fourth of the season.

Into October, and Blackpool travelled to Barnsley on the 5th. They won 4–2, courtesy of Hampson hat-trick and Jock Lauderdale's first goal of the season.

Blackpool hosted Cardiff City on 12 October, and the home side made it three wins on the trot with a 3–0 scoreline. Billy Tremelling, Hampson and Cyril Quinn got the goals.

Another victory followed, at Preston North End in the first West Lancashire derby of the season. Another Hampson treble, along with two goals from Downes and one from Lauderdale, resulted in a 6–4 scoreline.

Bristol City visited the seaside on 26 October, and Blackpool continued their winning trend. A hat-trick from Downes, two goals from Hampson, and one each from Lauderdale and Upton gave Harry Evans' men a 7–1 victory.

Blackpool travelled to Notts County on 2 November, and returned home with both points after a 2–0 victory. Lauderdale and Hampson were the goalscorers.

Seven days later, Blackpool welcomed Reading to Bloomfield Road. A Hampson double, and one goal apiece from Upton and Quinn gave the home side a 4–2 victory.

Charlton Athletic was the destination on 16 November, and Blackpool recorded their eighth consecutive victory, courtesy of goals by Hall, Hampson and Upton (two).

Blackpool suffered only their third defeat in fifteen games at home to Hull City on 23 November. Hampson scored the hosts' goal in the 1–2 scoreline.

Hampson was the sole Blackpool scorer once again in the following game, and this time it was the only goal of the game as the Seasiders won at Stoke City.

December began with a 3–2 edging of Wolves at Bloomfield Road, Neal, Hampson and Upton the scorers for Pool.

Bradford City were their next opponents, at Valley Parade, on 14 December. Honours were shared in a 1–1 draw, Blackpool's first such result of the season. Downes got the visitors' goal.

Swansea Town visited Bloomfield Road a week later. Blackpool won 3–0, with goals from Hampson (two) and Downes.

Two games in as many days against Chelsea followed. At Bloomfield Road on Christmas Day the two sides drew 1–1, with Ritchie getting the Seasiders' goal. On Boxing Day, Chelsea hosted the Lancastrians at Stamford Bridge. The home side were victorious 4–0. It was the first time Blackpool had failed to score in their 21 league games up until that point.

The Seasiders remained in London for their next game, at Millwall on 28 December, their fourth game in seven days. Millwall won 3–1. Upton scored the visitors' goal.

On New Year's Day, Blackpool travelled to Bury, and returned to winning ways with a single-goal result. Ritchie was the scorer.

On 4 January, Southampton made the long trip to Bloomfield Road. Blackpool won 5–1, courtesy of a Hampson's hat-trick of hat-tricks for the season and one each from Tremelling and Ritchie.

The FA Cup intervened on 11 January. Blackpool hosted Stockport County at Bloomfield Road in a third-round tie and won 2–1, both strikes by Tommy Browell, his only goals of the season.

Back to League affairs, Blackpool returned to London to face Tottenham Hotspur at White Hart Lane. Spurs won 6–1, Quinn getting the visitors' goal.

Blackpool exited the FA Cup at the fourth-round stage on 25 January. Hull City knocked them out with a 3–1 home victory. Hampson scored Blackpool's goal.

A third consecutive defeat for Blackpool ensued, this time in the League at Bradford Park Avenue on 1 February. The 0–5 scoreline meant Blackpool had conceded fourteen goals in those three matches.

Blackpool completed a double over Barnsley on 8 February. Downes and Hampson scored the goals in the 2–1 Bloomfield Road victory.

Inconsistency remained the theme as Blackpool lost their next game, at Cardiff City on 15 February. Albert Watson, with his only strike of the season, and Charles Broadhurst, with his first of the season, were the scorers for the visitors in their 4–2 defeat.

Goals from Ritchie, Broadhurst, Upton (two) and Hampson gave Blackpool a 5–1 home victory over Preston North End on 22 February, making a total of sixteen goals scored in the two West Lancashire derbies this season.

Bristol City were the next opponents for Blackpool, at Ashton Gate on 1 March. A Broadhurst strike was the only goal of the game.

Four days later, at home to West Brom, Blackpool made it three wins on the trot with another single-goal scoreline. Hampson scored his 33rd league goal of the campaign, and was not done yet.

Notts County were the visitors to Bloomfield Road on 8 March, and they returned to Nottingham with both points after a 2–1 victory. A Broadhurst penalty accounted for Blackpool's side of the scoreline.

Blackpool travelled to Reading seven days later, and they returned home with a point. Hampson got the visitors' goal in the 1–1 scoreline.

Hampson took his league goals haul to forty courtesy of four goals in a 6–0 win at home to Charlton Athletic on 22 March. Charlie Rattray and Upton got Pool's other goals.

Blackpool also defeated Hull City, at Anlaby Road, the following weekend. Hampson, with a brace, and Broadhurst got the goals in the 3–0 result.

Stoke City exacted revenge for their defeat back in November with a 2–0 victory at Bloomfield Road on 5 April.

The second of April's five league fixtures for Blackpool took them to Wolves on the 12th. Hampson and Tremelling scored in the visitors' 2–1 win.

On 18 April, Blackpool and Oldham Athletic faced each other in the first of two meetings in three days. Blackpool won the first match-up, at Bloomfield Road, 3–0. Jack Oxberry, Hampson and Downes scored the goals.

The scoreline was repeated the next day at the same venue. Bradford City were on the receiving end of two goals from Hampson and one from Oxberry.

Blackpool also won the return fixture with Oldham Athletic, at Boundary Park, 1–2. Hampson and Oxberry (his third goal in as many games) were the scorers once more.

April's final game took Blackpool to Swansea, where they were dealt a 3–0 defeat.

Blackpool claimed the championship on the final day of the season, 3 May, with a goalless draw at Nottingham Forest. Runners-up Chelsea could have won the title themselves the same afternoon if they had won and Blackpool had lost, but the Londoners were defeated at Bury by a single goal.

== Table ==
Pos	Team	Pld	W	D	L	GF	GA	GAv	Pts	Relegation
1	Blackpool (C, P)	42	27	4	11	98	67	1.463	58	Promotion to the First Division
2	Chelsea (P)	42	22	11	9	74	46	1.609	55	Promotion to the First Division
3	Oldham Athletic	42	21	11	10	90	51	1.765	53	
4	Bradford (Park Avenue)	42	19	12	11	91	70	1.300	50	
5	Bury	42	22	5	15	78	67	1.164	49	

Rules for classification: 1) Points; 2) Goal average; 3) Goals scored
(C) Champions; (P) Promoted

== Player statistics ==
=== Appearances ===
Name	League	FA Cup	Total
Jimmy Hampson	41	2	43
William Grant	40	2	42
Billy Tremelling	38	2	40
Albert Watson	37	2	39
Percy Downes	37	1	38
Stan Ramsay	37	1	38
Syd Tuffnell	29	2	31
Billy Upton	29	1	30
George Wolf	26	2	28
Alex Ritchie	17	2	19
Cyril Quinn	16	2	18
Charles Broadhurst	15	0	15
Jock Lauderdale	15	0	15
Horace Pearson	15	0	15
Harry Wilson	11	0	11
Jack Oxberry	10	0	10
Billy Benton	9	0	9
Charlie Rattray	9	0	9
Willie Hall	8	0	8
Dick Neal	7	0	7
Percy Jennings	3	1	4
Tommy Browell	1	2	3
Jimmy Hamilton	3	0	3
Billy Gibson	2	0	2
Syd Brookes	1	0	1
Fred Swift	1	0	1
Arthur Smalley	4	0	4

Players used: 27

=== Goals ===
Name	League	FA Cup	Total
Jimmy Hampson	45	1	46
Percy Downes	13	0	13
Billy Upton	12	0	12
Charles Broadhurst	5	0	5
Alex Ritchie	5	0	5
Jock Lauderdale	4	0	4
Jack Oxberry	3	0	3
Cyril Quinn	3	0	3
Billy Tremelling	3	0	3
Dick Neal	2	0	2
Tommy Browell	0	2	2
Willie Hall	1	0	1
Charlie Rattray	1	0	1
Albert Watson	1	0	1

Total goals scored: 101
