= Jack Oxberry =

English footballer

Personal information
- Full name: John Oxberry
- Date of birth: 4 January 1901
- Place of birth: Sunderland, England
- Date of death: 1962 (aged 60–61)
- Position: Inside forward

Senior career*
Years	Team	Apps	(Gls)
1917–1918	Hylton Colliery		
1918–1919	Boldon Colliery Welfare		
1919–1928	South Shields	170	(63)
1928–1932	Blackpool	74	(20)
1932–1935	Reading	87	(24)
1935–1936	Aldershot	14	(1)
1936	Ashington		
Total		345	(108)
- * Club domestic league appearances and goals

John Oxberry (4 January 1901 – 1962) was an English footballer who played in the Football League for Aldershot, Blackpool, Reading and South Shields.
