= Jack O'Donnell (footballer) =

English footballer

Personal information
- Full name: John O'Donnell
- Date of birth: 25 March 1897
- Place of birth: Gateshead, England
- Date of death: 24 August 1952 (aged 55)
- Height: 5 ft 8 1/2 in (1.74 m)
- Position: Defender

Senior career*
Years	Team	Apps	(Gls)
1923–1924	Darlington	30	(0)
1924–1930	Everton	188	(10)
1930–1932	Blackpool	55	(0)
1932	Hartlepools United	28	(2)
1933	Wigan Athletic		
1933-1935	Dolphin		
- * Club domestic league appearances and goals

John O'Donnell (25 March 1897 – 1952) was an English professional footballer.

== Career ==
Born in Gateshead, County Durham, on 25 March 1897, O'Donnell, like so many other footballers from the North East, started his career playing for his local colliery team (in his case, Felling). Darlington soon signed him, and he earned a reputation as a hard-tackling full-back. Everton paid around £3,000 for him soon afterwards, a fee that was rare for a defender. The move didn't work out, however, and Blackpool bought him for a similar price.

O'Donnell joined the Seasiders in late 1930, making his debut for the club on 20 December, in a home game against Grimsby Town. For the next two seasons he became a regular in the back line as Blackpool tried desperately to retain their recently achieved First Division status.

O'Donnell's move coincided with a time of trouble for the Blackpool defence. By the end of the 1930-31 season, the club had conceded 125 goals, followed by 102.

Disciplinary problems followed O'Donnell. It was reported on three occasions that the club had suspended him for various matters. Eventually it was mutually agreed to terminate his contract, and O'Donnell played out the remainder of his career in the lower leagues, notably with Wigan Athletic. After just three months with Wigan, O'Donnell moved across the Irish Sea to join Dublin side Dolphin in the League of Ireland.
