= Jimmy Hampson =

English footballer (1906–1938)

Personal information
- Full name: James Hampson
- Date of birth: 23 March 1906
- Place of birth: Little Hulton, England
- Date of death: 10 January 1938 (aged 31)
- Place of death: Fleetwood, England
- Height: 5 ft 6 1/4 in (1.68 m)
- Position: Centre forward

Youth career
- 192?–1925: Walkden Park

Senior career*
Years	Team	Apps	(Gls)
1925–1927	Nelson	64	(42)
1927–1938	Blackpool	361	(248)
Total		425	(290)

International career
1930–1932	England	3	(5)
- * Club domestic league appearances and goals

James Hampson (23 March 1906 – 10 January 1938) was an English professional footballer. He spent eleven seasons at Blackpool, where he remains record goalscorer with 252 goals in 373 games, and is still regarded as one of the best centre forwards to play for the club.

== Club career ==
Born in Little Hulton, Lancashire, Hampson began his career with Walkden Park. In 1925 he joined Football League Third Division, Nelson, and in his first season, 1925–26, he scored 13 goals in 20 league games. During his first season at Nelson, Hampson scored hat-tricks in three consecutive games. The following season, 1926–27, he scored 23 goals in 35 games.

In October 1927, he joined Blackpool for a fee of £1,000, scoring on his debut in a 3–1 defeat at Notts County on 15 October. He went on to score 31 goals in the remaining 32 games of the 1927–28 season, including two in his second game for the club, against Manchester City. He missed just one game in his first season for the club, and his goals helped Blackpool stave off relegation, finishing the season 19th in the Second Division.

The following season, 1928–29, he scored 40 goals to become the Second Division's top scorer. He scored five goals in the first four games that season, prompting other clubs to take an interest in signing him. In September, Blackpool denied that they had received an offer from Arsenal. After a 2–0 defeat to Stoke City on 13 October 1928, Blackpool fans cheered him off the pitch and he was described as being the "darling of Blackpool". On 10 November, he scored a then club-record five goals in a 7–0 victory over Reading. The record has since been equalled by Jimmy McIntosh. Blackpool finished that season in eighth place.

In July 1929, Millwall tried unsuccessfully to sign him. The following December, Derby County also tried to sign him but were also turned down.

In 1929–30, Blackpool won the Second Division championship and were promoted to the top flight for the first time in their history. Hampson was the top goalscorer in England with 46 strikes in 44 league and cup games. He played one game, against local rivals Preston North End, at inside-right, but still scored one goal as Blackpool won 5–1.

Hampson (right), shaking hands with former Blackpool forward Peter Doherty, of Manchester City, in the late 1930s.

At the end of their debut season in the First Division (1930–31), Blackpool drew their final game against Manchester City to escape relegation back to the Second Division. Although Blackpool conceded 125 goals, Hampson still managed to score 31 goals in 41 games. The following season, 1931–32, Blackpool again struggled against relegation, with Hampson scoring 23 league goals in 42 games as the club finished one place above the relegation places. Again the club had to deny transfer rumours. At the Supporters Club's annual dinner, held at the resort's Winter Gardens on 10 November 1931, the club stated that they had "no intention of parting with Hampson".

The following season, 1932–33, Blackpool were relegated, finishing bottom of the league with Hampson scoring 18 league goals in 34 games. During the season, Hampson lost his position as centre-forward to defender Phil Watson before being moved to the right wing for the game against Sheffield United on 22 April 1933. He was reinstated as centre-forward, however, for the final game of the season, at Newcastle United.

During the following 1933–34 season, it was reported that he had turned down the club's terms for a new contract; however, the terms were soon sorted and he signed on again for the next season. After 21 games and 13 goals, he was injured and he made just one more appearance for the club that season.

He scored a hat-trick in the opening game of the 1934–35 season against Bury; however, following a spell in which he did not score, he was dropped and Blackpool stated that they would be prepared to transfer him. He did not play again until February 1935, and ended the season on 21 goals from 25 starts. He missed the start of the 1935–36 season with an injury, coupled with the club signing Scottish international striker Bobby Finan. Hampson did not play until 9 October 1935, against Charlton Athletic, when he scored in a 1–1 draw. He was not a regular starter that season and finished on just six goals from 21 games, although he had to play at inside-left for much of them.

Hampson and Finan scored 44 goals between them in the 1936–37 season, with Hampson scoring 16 of them (not 15 as sometimes listed) as Blackpool finished as runners-up and were once again promoted to the First Division. Hampson started the 1937–38 season scoring four goals in 19 league games.

Hampson held the record for the fastest century of goals: 101 in 97 games between 1927 and 1930.

== Blackpool F.C. Hall of Fame ==
Hampson was inducted into the Hall of Fame at Bloomfield Road, when it was officially opened by former Blackpool player Jimmy Armfield in April 2006. Organised by the Blackpool Supporters Association, Blackpool fans around the world voted on their all-time heroes. Five players from each decade are inducted; Hampson is in the pre-1950s.

== International career ==
Hampson's international career was brief, due to the presence of Dixie Dean combined with Hampson's club playing in the League's second tier. He scored five goals in just three appearances. He scored one goal on his debut against Ireland on 20 October 1930, which England won 5–1. He then scored twice against Wales on 22 November in a 4–0 win. His last appearance for his country came in December 1932 against Austria when he again scored twice. He played for the Football League representative team four times, scoring nine goals – including a hat-trick in a game against the Irish Football League held at Bloomfield Road. He also played for a Football League XI against a combined Wales and Ireland XI in a game held to celebrate the jubilee of King George V in May 1935. Hampson scored five goals in a 10–2 win for the Football League XI.

== Death ==
On 8 January 1938, Hampson played his last-ever match, an FA Cup tie for Blackpool against Birmingham City. His final contribution was a quick throw-in, seven minutes before the end of the match, from which Blackpool scored.

On 10 January, a day after visiting his wife, Betty, who was ill in a nursing home, Hampson went out fishing with some friends off the Fleetwood coast. Their 40-foot yacht, Defender, collided with a trawler and the 31-year-old Hampson was knocked overboard. He drowned, and his body was never recovered.

== See also ==
- List of people who disappeared mysteriously at sea

== Career statistics ==
=== Club statistics ===
Appearances and goals by club, season and competition
Club	Season	League			FA Cup		Other		Total	
Club	Season	Division	Apps	Goals	Apps	Goals	Apps	Goals	Apps	Goals
Nelson	1925–26	Third Division	20	13	0	0	0	0	20	13
Nelson	1926–27	Third Division	35	23	2	2	0	0	37	25
Nelson	1927–28	Third Division	9	6	0	0	0	0	9	6
Nelson	Total		64	42	2	2	0	0	66	44
Blackpool	1927–28	Second Division	32	31	1	0	0	0	33	31
Blackpool	1928–29	Second Division	41	40	1	0	0	0	42	40
Blackpool	1929–30	Second Division	41	45	2	1	0	0	43	46
Blackpool	1930–31	First Division	41	32	2	1	0	0	43	33
Blackpool	1931–32	First Division	42	23	2	1	0	0	44	24
Blackpool	1932–33	First Division	35	18	3	1	0	0	38	19
Blackpool	1933–34	Second Division	23	13	0	0	0	0	23	13
Blackpool	1934–35	Second Division	25	20	0	0	0	0	25	20
Blackpool	1935–36	Second Division	21	6	0	0	0	0	21	6
Blackpool	1936–37	Second Division	42	16	0	0	0	0	42	16
Blackpool	1937–38	First Division	18	4	1	0	0	0	19	4
Blackpool	Total		361	248	12	4	0	0	373	252
Career total			425	290	14	6	0	0	439	296

=== International statistics ===
Appearances and goals by national team and year
National team	Year	Apps	Goals
England	1930	2	3
England	1932	1	2
Total		3	5

=== International goals ===
Scores and results list England's goal tally first. Score after each Hampson goal is shown in bold with asterisk.

List of international goals scored by Jimmy Hampson
#	Date	Venue	Opponent	Cap	Minute	Score	Result	Competition
1	20 October 1930	Bramall Lane, Sheffield, England	Ireland	1	25'	**2***–0	5–1	1930–31 British Home Championship
2	22 November 1930	Racecourse Ground, Wrexham, Wales	Wales	2	12'	**1***–0	4–0	1930–31 British Home Championship
3	22 November 1930	Racecourse Ground, Wrexham, Wales	Wales	2	70'	**3***–0	4–0	1930–31 British Home Championship
4	7 December 1932	Stamford Bridge, London, England	Austria	3	5'	**1***–0	4–3	Friendly
5	7 December 1932	Stamford Bridge, London, England	Austria	3	27'	**2***–0	4–3	Friendly

== Honours ==
Blackpool

- Football League Second Division: 1929–30
- Football League Second Division runner-up: 1936–37

England

- British Home Championship: 1930–31
