= 1939–40 Blackpool F.C. season =

English football club season

Blackpool F.C.
1939–40 season
- Manager: Joe Smith
- North-West Regional League: 3rd
- FA Cup: Competition suspended
- League War Cup: Fourth round
- Top goalscorer: League: Jock Dodds (30); All: Jock Dodds (38)
Home colours

The 1939–40 season was Blackpool F.C.'s first season in special wartime football during World War II. Upon the abandonment of League football in September 1939 (after three games, at which point Blackpool were top of Division One with a 100% record), they competed in the North-West Regional League, finishing third.

Jock Dodds was the club's top scorer for the second consecutive season, with 38 goals in all competitions. These do not count in official statistics, however.
