= 1926–27 Blackpool F.C. season =

English football club season

Blackpool F.C.
1926–27 season
- Manager: Major Frank Buckley
- Division Two: 9th
- FA Cup: Third round
- Top goalscorer: League: Billy Tremelling (30); All: Billy Tremelling (31)

The 1926–27 season was Blackpool F.C.'s 26th season (23rd consecutive) in the Football League. They competed in the 22-team Division Two, then the second tier of English football, finishing ninth.

Billy Tremelling was the club's top scorer, with 31 goals in total (thirty in the league and one in the FA Cup).

== Season synopsis ==
An opening day defeat at Nottingham Forest was tempered by three straight victories.

A run of four consecutive defeats in October set the team back, but the fourteen victories that they put on the board during the remainder of the season helped them obtain a top-half finish.

The team sent Frank Buckley on his way to pastures new with a 5–0 home victory over Notts County on the final day. He became manager of Wolves the following season, remaining with them for seventeen years.

== Table ==
Pos	Team	Pld	W	D	L	GF	GA	GAv	Pts
7	Hull City	42	20	7	15	63	52	1.212	47
8	Port Vale	42	16	13	13	88	78	1.128	45
9	Blackpool	42	18	8	16	95	80	1.188	44
10	Oldham Athletic	42	19	6	17	74	84	0.881	44
11	Barnsley	42	17	9	16	88	87	1.011	43
