= Charles Broadhurst =

English footballer

Personal information
- Place of birth: Moston, Greater Manchester, England
- Position: Centre forward

Senior career*
Years	Team	Apps	(Gls)
	Ashton National	0	(0)
1926–1928	Manchester City	33	(25)
1929–1930	Blackpool	18	(6)
- * Club domestic league appearances and goals

Charles Broadhurst was an English professional footballer. A centre forward, he played for two Football League clubs during the 1920s and 1930s.

== Career ==
Moston-born Broadhurst began his career with Ashton National, before turning professional with Manchester City in the 1926–27 season. He scored on his professional debut, a 2–2 draw at Darlington in April 1927. He played again in the return match three days later, and this time scored four goals in a 7–0 win.

At this time Manchester City were in contention for promotion to the First Division. The race for promotion went to the final match, with Manchester City and Portsmouth chasing the second of the two promotion places. Broadhurst scored twice in a resounding City win, an 8–0 victory against Bradford City. The watching crowd believed the result to be sufficient for promotion, but Portsmouth's match had been delayed by 15 minutes and was still in progress. A late Portsmouth goal meant the final scoreline in their match was a 5–1 win, enough to give Portsmouth second place on goal average by a margin of one two-hundredth of a goal.

The following season Broadhurst scored 20 goals in 28 appearances as Manchester City won the Second Division championship. However, he made no appearances after February, and made just five appearances in the 1928–29 season. In total, he made 33 League appearances and scored 25 goals in his two years with the Maine Road club.

In 1929 he moved to nearby Blackpool, for whom he made eighteen League appearances and scored six goals in his season-and-a-half with the club.
