= 1957–58 Blackpool F.C. season =

English football club season

Blackpool F.C.
1957–58 season
- Manager: Joe Smith
- Division One: 7th
- FA Cup: Third round
- Top goalscorer: League: Jackie Mudie & Bill Perry (18 each); All: Jackie Mudie & Bill Perry (18 each)
Home colours

The 1957–58 season was Blackpool F.C.'s 50th season (47th consecutive) in the Football League. They competed in the 22-team Division One, then the top tier of English football, finishing seventh.

This was Joe Smith's 23rd and final season as Blackpool manager.

Jackie Mudie was the club's top scorer for the third consecutive season; this time, however, he shared the accolade with Bill Perry, who matched his eighteen goals.

== Table ==
Pos	Team	Pld	W	D	L	GF	GA	GAv	Pts
5	Manchester City	42	22	5	15	104	100	1.040	49
6	Burnley	42	21	5	16	80	74	1.081	47
7	Blackpool	42	19	6	17	80	67	1.194	44
8	Luton Town	42	19	6	17	69	63	1.095	44
9	Manchester United	42	16	11	15	85	75	1.133	43

Source: World Football
Rules for classification: 1) Points; 2) Goal average; 3) Goals scored
