= Sydney Beaumont =

English footballer and manager (1884–1939)

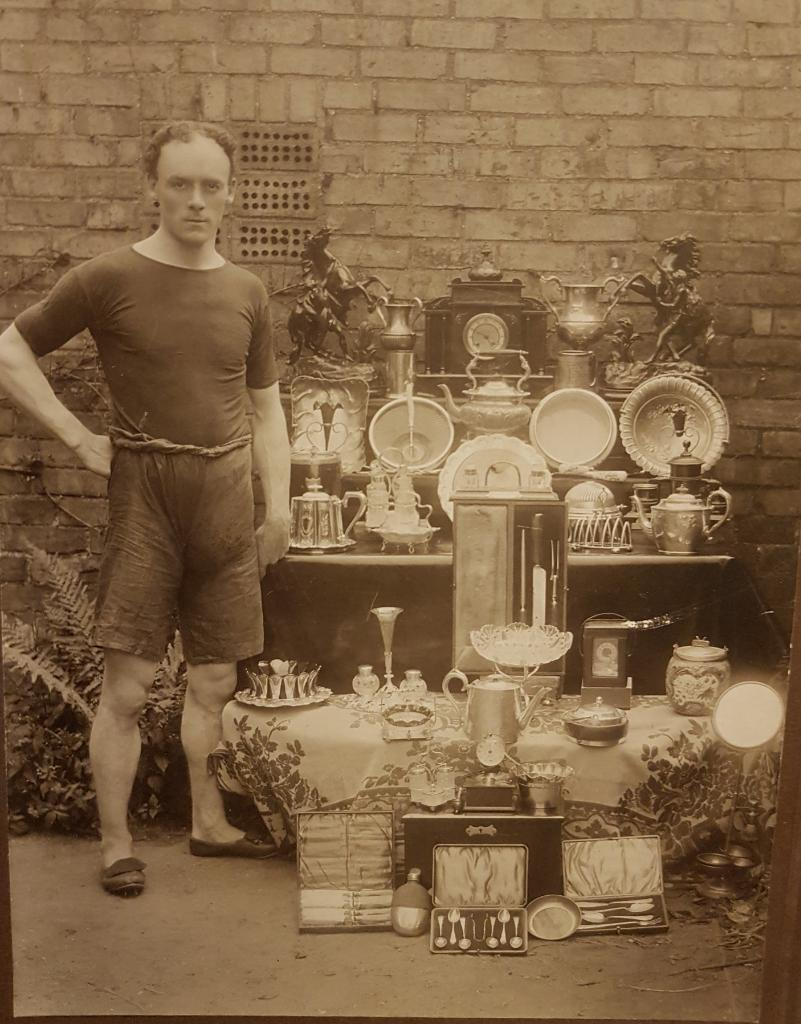
- Beaumont with his athletics trophies

Personal information
- Date of birth: 8 October 1884
- Place of birth: Wrestlingworth, England
- Date of death: May 1939 (aged 54–55)
- Positions: Half back; left winger

Senior career*
Years	Team	Apps	(Gls)
- Colchester Town
1904–1905	Lincoln City	5	(0)
????–1909	Biggleswade & District		
1909–1911	Watford	27	(1)
1911–1912	Preston North End	1	(0)
1912–1913	Merthyr Town		
1913–????	Troedyrhiw		
- Llanelli

Managerial career
- 1920–1923: Barry Town
- 1923–1927: Aberdare Athletic
- 1927–1928: Blackpool
- 1928–????: Bangor City
- * Club domestic league appearances and goals

Sydney Beaumont (8 October 1884 – May 1939) was an English professional footballer and football manager, runner and cricketer. He played at both half back and left wing during his football career and won many trophies for middle-distance running.

== Early life and playing career ==
Beaumont was born in Wrestlingworth, Bedfordshire, and began his career with Colchester Town. He moved on to Lincoln City, making his league debut in the 1904–05 season. However, he made just five league appearances for the Imps before joining Bedfordshire side Biggleswade & District.

He joined Watford in 1909, playing in the Southern League. He played 25 times for Watford before joining Preston North End in 1911, but made just one league appearance before joining Merthyr Town in the 1912 close season. He also played for Merthy Town Cricket Club.

He spent just one season with Merthyr, making fifteen appearances, before joining Troedyrhiw in the summer of 1913. He later finished his playing career with Llanelli.

== Managerial career ==
After steering Barry Town to their first ever league championship in 1921, the summer of 1923 saw Beaumont appointed as manager of Third Division South side Aberdare Athletic. Aberdare finished 9th in the 1925–26 season, but a combination of circumstances, including industrial action amongst the local mining community which affected attendances and the burning down of a wooden grandstand, meant that Aberdare's poor financial situation deteriorated. At the end of the 1926–27 season, Aberdare failed to gain re-election to the league and were replaced by Torquay United.

Beaumont left that summer, but was soon appointed as manager of Blackpool, another club with severe financial problems at that time. He took over from Frank Buckley and immediately began to dismantle the team and bring in big-money names. His outlook was different from that of his predecessor, and his overhaul of tactics resulted in problems. The team struggled, losing five of their first six league games (a draw at Swansea on the opening day being the exception to the rule). One tactic that did work, however, was his moving Billy Tremelling from centre-forward back to half back, which resulted in a fruitful partnership with Jimmy Hampson (a player Beaumont had brought to the seaside).

Being a former Preston North End player hardly endeared Beaumont to the Blackpool faithful. As the Seasiders struggled in Division Two, criticism of Beaumont grew. Eventually, in May 1928, with the team in the bottom three, he resigned — at the time becoming the club's shortest-serving manager with 42 League games to his name.

Two months later, he took over as secretary-manager of Bangor City.

He joined the ground staff of Chester Football Club in 1933 and served as their assistant trainer from 1936 until his death in 1939.

== Death ==
Beaumont died in May 1939, leaving his widow Elizabeth Beaumont and five children. His son, Robert, was a footballer and cricketer.

== Gallery ==
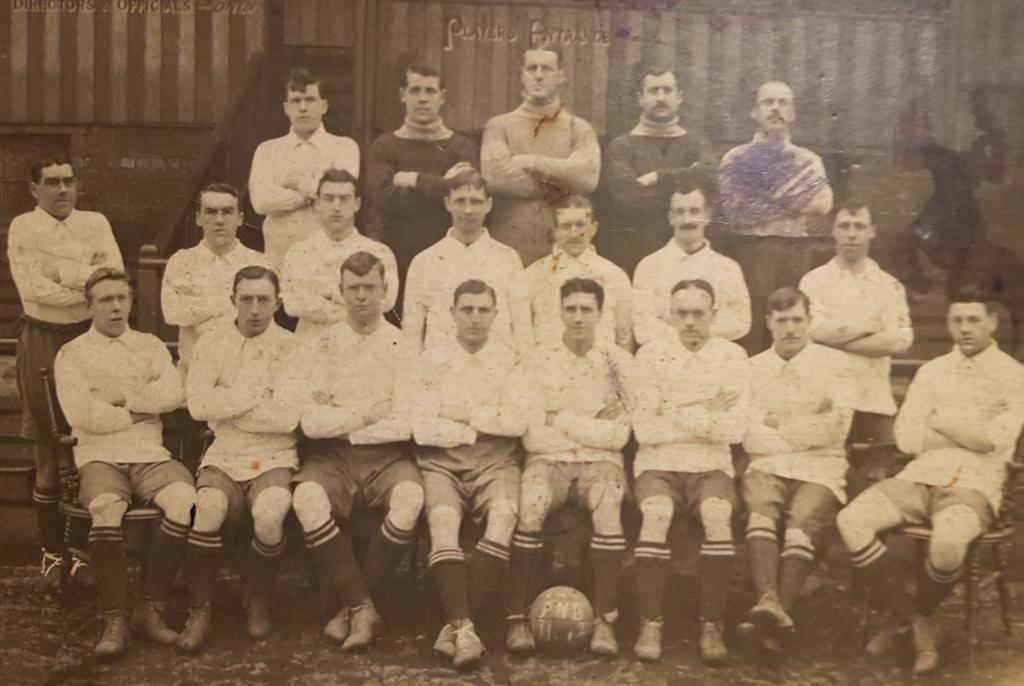
Beaumont at Preston North End. Bottom row, third from right

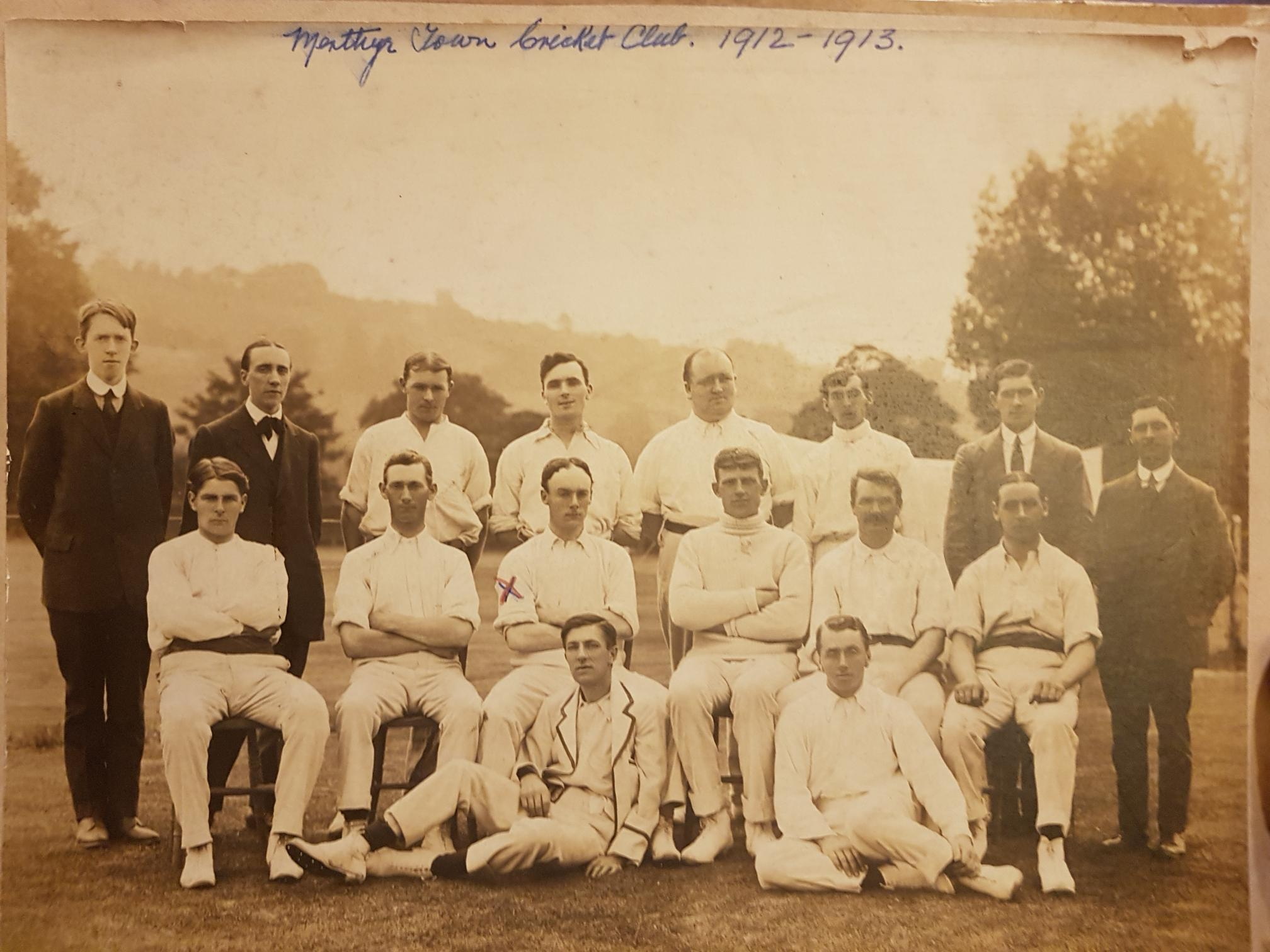
Beaumont at Merthyr Town Cricket Club

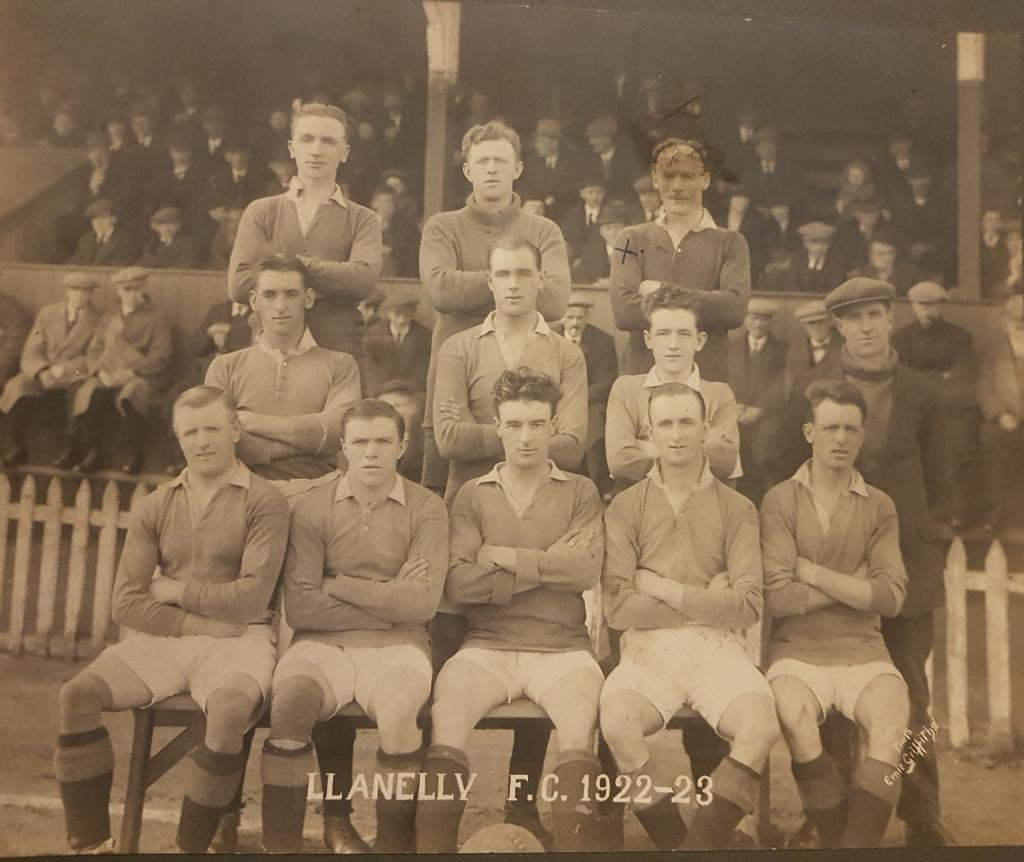
Beaumont at Llanelly FC
