= 1925–26 Blackpool F.C. season =

English football club season

Blackpool F.C.
1925–26 season
- Manager: Major Frank Buckley
- Division Two: 6th
- FA Cup: Third round
- Top goalscorer: League: Bert Fishwick (19); All: Bert Fishwick (19)
Home colours

The 1925–26 season was Blackpool F.C.'s 25th season (22nd consecutive) in the Football League. They competed in the 22-team Division Two, then the second tier of English football, finishing sixth.

Bert Fishwick was the club's top scorer, with nineteen goals.

== Season synopsis ==
It was a slow start to the season, with only two victories procured in their first eight games.

Despite Harry Bedford being sold to Derby County in late September, Blackpool's fortunes began to change. Bert Fishwick, signed from Plymouth Argyle as Bedford's replacement, assisted in a recovery that saw the club vanquish the previous campaign's tussle with relegation from their minds.

== Table ==
Pos	Team	Pld	W	D	L	GF	GA	GAv	Pts
4	Wolverhampton Wanderers	42	21	7	14	84	60	1.400	49
5	Swansea Town	42	19	11	12	77	57	1.351	49
6	Blackpool	42	17	11	14	76	69	1.101	45
7	Oldham Athletic	42	18	8	16	74	62	1.194	44
8	Port Vale	42	19	6	17	79	69	1.145	44

== Transfers ==
=== In ===
Date	Player	From	Fee

=== Out ===
Date	Player	From	Fee
