= 1928–29 Blackpool F.C. season =

English football club season

Blackpool F.C.
1928–29 season
- Manager: Harry Evans (honorary manager)
- Division Two: 8th
- FA Cup: Third round
- Top goalscorer: League: Jimmy Hampson (40); All: Jimmy Hampson (40)
Home colours

The 1928–29 season was Blackpool F.C.'s 28th season (25th consecutive) in the Football League. They competed in the 22-team Division Two, then the second tier of English football, finishing eighth.

Harry Evans became the club's honorary manager, succeeding Sydney Beaumont after his one season in charge.

Jimmy Hampson was the club's top scorer for the second consecutive season, with 40 goals.

== Season synopsis ==
The league campaign began with a West Lancashire derby fixture at Preston North End. The home side won 3–1.

Blackpool's first victory didn't come until the sixth game, a 2–1 scoreline over Bristol City at Bloomfield Road.

Out of the seven games in December, Blackpool won five, which — coupled with five victories in the final eight games of the season — assisted in their eighth-place finish.

Their FA Cup campaign ended at the first hurdle, the Third Round stage, again.

== Table ==
Pos	Team	Pld	W	D	L	GF	GA	GAv	Pts
6	Stoke City	42	17	12	13	74	51	1.451	46
7	West Bromwich Albion	42	19	8	15	80	79	1.013	46
8	Blackpool	42	19	7	16	92	76	1.211	45
9	Chelsea	42	17	10	15	64	65	0.985	44
10	Tottenham Hotspur	42	17	9	16	75	81	0.926	43
