= 1930–31 Blackpool F.C. season =

English football club season

Blackpool F.C.
1930–31 season
- Manager: Harry Evans (honorary manager)
- Division One: 20th
- FA Cup: Fourth round
- Top goalscorer: League: Jimmy Hampson (32); All: Jimmy Hampson (33)
Home colours

The 1930–31 season was Blackpool F.C.'s 30th season (27th consecutive) in the Football League. They competed in the 22-team Division One, then the top tier of English football, finishing twentieth and conceding a record 125 goals. Albert Watson's equalising goal against Manchester City in the final league game of the season was dubbed a "£10,000 goal", because it was said to be worth at least that amount as it secured the club's top-flight survival and its short-term future with the guarantee of large attendances for the next twelve months.

Jimmy Hampson was the club's top scorer for the fourth consecutive season, with 33 goals in total (32 in the league and one in the FA Cup).

== Table ==
Pos	Team	Pld	W	D	L	GF	GA	GAv	Pts	Relegation
18	West Ham United	42	14	8	20	79	94	0.840	36	
19	Birmingham	42	13	10	19	55	70	0.786	36	
20	Blackpool	42	11	10	21	71	125	0.568	32	
21	Leeds United (R)	42	12	7	23	68	81	0.840	31	Relegation to the Second Division
22	Manchester United (R)	42	7	8	27	53	115	0.461	22	Relegation to the Second Division

Source: World Football
Rules for classification: 1) Points; 2) Goal average; 3) Goals scored
(R) Relegated
