= 1937–38 Blackpool F.C. season =

English football club season

Blackpool F.C.
1937–38 season
- Manager: Joe Smith
- Division One: 12th
- FA Cup: Fourth round
- Top goalscorer: League: Bobby Finan & Willie Buchan (12 each); All: Bobby Finan & Willie Buchan (12 each)
Home colours

The 1937–38 season was Blackpool F.C.'s 37th season (34th consecutive) in the Football League. They competed in the 22-team Division One, then the top tier of English football, finishing twelfth.

Bobby Finan, the club's top scorer for the previous two seasons, shared the accolade this season with Willie Buchan, with twelve goals each in all competitions.

== Table ==
Pos	Team	Pld	W	D	L	GF	GA	GAv	Pts
10	Chelsea	42	14	13	15	65	65	1.000	41
11	Liverpool	42	15	11	16	65	71	0.915	41
12	Blackpool	42	16	8	18	61	66	0.924	40
13	Derby County	42	15	10	17	66	87	0.759	40
14	Everton	42	16	7	19	79	75	1.053	39

Source: World Football
Rules for classification: 1) Points; 2) Goal average; 3) Goals scored
