= 1934–35 Blackpool F.C. season =

English football club season

Blackpool F.C.
1934–35 season
- Manager: Sandy MacFarlane
- Division Two: 4th
- FA Cup: Third round
- Top goalscorer: League: Jimmy Hampson (20); All: Jimmy Hampson (20)
Home colours

The 1934–35 season was Blackpool F.C.'s 34th season (31st consecutive) in the Football League. They competed in the 22-team Division Two, then the second tier of English football, finishing fourth.

Jimmy Hampson was the club's top scorer for the eighth consecutive season, with twenty goals.

== Table ==
Pos	Team	Pld	W	D	L	GF	GA	GAv	Pts	Promotion or relegation
2	Bolton Wanderers (P)	42	26	4	12	96	48	2.000	56	Promotion to the First Division
3	West Ham United	42	26	4	12	80	63	1.270	56	
4	Blackpool	42	21	11	10	79	57	1.386	53	
5	Manchester United	42	23	4	15	76	55	1.382	50	
6	Newcastle United	42	22	4	16	89	68	1.309	48	

Rules for classification: 1) Points; 2) Goal average; 3) Goals scored
(P) Promoted
