= 1936–37 Blackpool F.C. season =

English football club season

Blackpool F.C.
1936–37 season
- Manager: Joe Smith
- Division Two: 2nd (promoted)
- FA Cup: Third round
- Top goalscorer: League: Bobby Finan (28); All: Bobby Finan (30)
Home colours

The 1936–37 season was Blackpool F.C.'s 36th season (33rd consecutive) in the Football League. They competed in the 22-team Division Two, then the second tier of English football, finishing second. They were promoted to Division One, their second time in the top flight.

Bobby Finan was the club's top scorer for the second consecutive season, with thirty goals (28 in the league and two in the FA Cup).

When Blackpool visited Bury on New Year's Day, the Gigg Lane club presented the Tangerines with a box of black puddings in recognition of their eight-match winning streak. Blackpool then promptly extended the streak to nine games.

== Table ==
| Pos | Team | Pld | W | D | L | GF | GA | GAv | Pts | Promotion or relegation |
|---|---|---|---|---|---|---|---|---|---|---|
| 1 | Leicester City (C, P) | 42 | 24 | 8 | 10 | 89 | 57 | 1.561 | 56 | Promotion to the First Division |
| 2 | Blackpool (P) | 42 | 24 | 7 | 11 | 88 | 53 | 1.660 | 55 | Promotion to the First Division |
| 3 | Bury | 42 | 22 | 8 | 12 | 74 | 55 | 1.345 | 52 | |
| 4 | Newcastle United | 42 | 22 | 5 | 15 | 80 | 56 | 1.429 | 49 | |
| 5 | Plymouth Argyle | 42 | 18 | 13 | 11 | 71 | 53 | 1.340 | 49 | |

Rules for classification: 1) Points; 2) Goal average; 3) Goals scored
(C) Champions; (P) Promoted
