= 1933–34 Blackpool F.C. season =

English football club season

Blackpool F.C.
1933–34 season
- Manager: Sandy MacFarlane
- Division Two: 11th
- FA Cup: Fourth round
- Top goalscorer: League: Jimmy Hampson (13); All: Jimmy Hampson (13)
Home colours

The 1933–34 season was Blackpool F.C.'s 33rd season (30th consecutive) in the Football League. They competed in the 22-team Division Two, then the second tier of English football, finishing eleventh.

Sandy MacFarlane succeeded Harry Evans as manager prior to the start of the season.

Jimmy Hampson was the club's top scorer for the seventh consecutive season, with thirteen goals.

== Table ==
Pos	Team	Pld	W	D	L	GF	GA	GAv	Pts
9	Oldham Athletic	42	17	10	15	72	60	1.200	44
10	Plymouth Argyle	42	15	13	14	69	70	0.986	43
11	Blackpool	42	15	13	14	62	64	0.969	43
12	Bury	42	17	9	16	70	73	0.959	43
13	Burnley	42	18	6	18	60	72	0.833	42

Rules for classification: 1) Points; 2) Goal average; 3) Goals scored
