= 1932–33 Blackpool F.C. season =

English football club season

Blackpool F.C.
1932–33 season
- Manager: Harry Evans (honorary manager)
- Division One: 22nd (relegated)
- FA Cup: Fifth round
- Top goalscorer: League: Jimmy Hampson (18); All: Jimmy Hampson (19)

The 1932–33 season was Blackpool F.C.'s 32nd season (29th consecutive) in the Football League. They competed in the 22-team Division One, then the top tier of English football, finishing bottom. They were relegated to Division Two.

Jimmy Hampson was the club's top scorer for the sixth consecutive season, with nineteen goals in total (eighteen in the league and one in the FA Cup).

On 17 October 1932, two days after Blackpool played Leicester City at Bloomfield Road, the ground hosted its first and thus far only full international match: England versus Ireland. England won by a single goal.

== Table ==
Pos	Team	Pld	W	D	L	GF	GA	GAv	Pts	Relegation
18	Chelsea	42	14	7	21	63	73	0.863	35	
19	Leicester City	42	11	13	18	75	89	0.843	35	
20	Wolverhampton Wanderers	42	13	9	20	80	96	0.833	35	
21	Bolton Wanderers (R)	42	12	9	21	78	92	0.848	33	Relegation to the Second Division
22	Blackpool (R)	42	14	5	23	69	85	0.812	33	Relegation to the Second Division

Source: World Football
Rules for classification: 1) Points; 2) Goal average; 3) Goals scored
(R) Relegated
