= 1935–36 Blackpool F.C. season =

English football club season

Blackpool F.C.
1935–36 season
- Manager: Joe Smith
- Division Two: 10th
- FA Cup: Fourth round
- Top goalscorer: League: Bobby Finan (34); All: Bobby Finan (36)
Home colours

The 1935–36 season was Blackpool F.C.'s 35th season (32nd consecutive) in the Football League. They competed in the 22-team Division Two, then the second tier of English football, finishing tenth.

Joe Smith succeeded Sandy MacFarlane as manager prior to the start of the season.

Bobby Finan was the club's top scorer with 36 goals (34 in the league and two in the FA Cup).

== Table ==
Pos	Team	Pld	W	D	L	GF	GA	GAv	Pts
8	Newcastle United	42	20	6	16	88	79	1.114	46
9	Fulham	42	15	14	13	76	52	1.462	44
10	Blackpool	42	18	7	17	93	72	1.292	43
11	Norwich City	42	17	9	16	72	65	1.108	43
12	Bradford City	42	15	13	14	55	65	0.846	43

Rules for classification: 1) Points; 2) Goal average; 3) Goals scored
