= Harry Evans (football manager) =

English football manager

Harold Evans was the manager of Blackpool F.C. between 1928 and 1933. After the resignation of Sydney Beaumont, the Blackpool directors, concerned about financial pressure, decided against appointing a full-time replacement and instead appointed Evans, also a director of the club, with the title of honorary manager. He was in charge for the next five seasons, aided by the club's trainers.

In 1929–30, under Evans' guidance, Blackpool won the Division Two championship, their only league title and could look forward to their debut in the top flight. After three seasons amongst the elite, they were relegated back to Division Two, which expedited a move to appoint a recognised manager. Evans, who is Blackpool's fourth longest serving manager, was succeeded by Sandy MacFarlane. He later became the club's chairman.

== Honours ==
Blackpool

- Division Two championship: 1929/30

== Managerial stats ==
Team	Nat	From	To	Record				
Team	Nat	From	To	G	W	L	D	Win %
Blackpool	(England)	1 August 1928	31 May 1933	220	87	97	36	39.54

== See also ==
- Blackpool F.C. season 1928-29
- Blackpool F.C. season 1929-30
- Blackpool F.C. season 1930-31
- Blackpool F.C. season 1931-32
- Blackpool F.C. season 1932-33
