= 1931–32 Blackpool F.C. season =

English football club season

Blackpool F.C.
1931–32 season
- Manager: Harry Evans (honorary manager)
- Division One: 20th
- FA Cup: Third round
- Top goalscorer: League: Jimmy Hampson (23); All: Jimmy Hampson (24)
Home colours

The 1931–32 season was Blackpool F.C.'s 31st season (28th consecutive) in the Football League. They competed in the 22-team Division One, then the top tier of English football, finishing twentieth.

Jimmy Hampson was the club's top scorer for the fifth consecutive season, with 24 goals in total (23 in the league and one in the FA Cup).

== Table ==
Pos	Team	Pld	W	D	L	GF	GA	GAv	Pts	Relegation
18	Middlesbrough	42	15	8	19	64	89	0.719	38	
19	Leicester City	42	15	7	20	74	94	0.787	37	
20	Blackpool	42	12	9	21	65	102	0.637	33	
21	Grimsby Town (R)	42	13	6	23	67	98	0.684	32	Relegation to the Second Division
22	West Ham United (R)	42	12	7	23	62	107	0.579	31	Relegation to the Second Division

Source: World Football
Rules for classification: 1) Points; 2) Goal average; 3) Goals scored
(R) Relegated
