= 1932–33 Burnley F.C. season =

English football club season

Burnley F.C.
1932–33 season
- Chairman: Edward Tate
- Manager: Tom Bromilow (from October 1932)
- Football League Second Division: 19th
- FA Cup: Quarter final
- Top goalscorer: League: Tommy Jones (16); All: Tommy Jones & Cecil Smith (16)
- Highest home attendance: 48,717 vs Manchester City (4 March 1933)
- Lowest home attendance: 4,845 vs Nottingham Forest (31 January 1933)
- Average home league attendance: 9,401
Home colours

The 1932–33 season was Burnley's 45th season of league football.

== Transfers ==
In
| Player | From | Date |
|---|---|---|
| Wilf Crompton | Blackburn Rovers | May 1932 |
| Charlie Hillam | Clitheroe | May 1932 |
| Gilbert Richmond | Clitheroe | May 1932 |
| Billy Jeavons | Chesterfield | June 1932 |
| Wally Reynolds | Leeds United | June 1932 |
| Cecil Smith | Stalybridge Celtic | June 1932 |
| William Graham | Blyth Spartans | September 1932 |
| Georgie Mee | Derby County | September 1932 |
| Ray Bennion | Manchester United | November 1932 |
| George Bellis | Wolverhampton Wanderers | December 1932 |
| Ted Hancock | Liverpool | February 1933 |
| Jack Mustard | Preston North End | March 1933 |
| William Wood | Blackburn Rovers | March 1933 |

Out
| Player | To | Date |
|---|---|---|
| Sam Jennings | Olympique de Marseille | May 1932 |
| Bob Weaver | Luton Town | May 1932 |
| Thomas Conway | Northampton Town | July 1932 |
| George Sommerville | Bristol City | August 1932 |
| Richard Twist | Preston North End | October 1932 |
| Stan Bowsher | Rochdale | March 1933 |
| Jack Kelly | Newcastle United | April 1933 |
| Charlie Hillam | Manchester United | May 1933 |
| Tom Manns | Manchester United | May 1933 |

== Football League Second Division ==
| Pos | Team | Pld | W | D | L | GF | GA | GAv | Pts | Promotion or relegation |
|---|---|---|---|---|---|---|---|---|---|---|
| 17 | Port Vale | 42 | 14 | 10 | 18 | 66 | 79 | 0.835 | 38 | |
| 18 | Lincoln City | 42 | 12 | 13 | 17 | 72 | 87 | 0.828 | 37 | |
| 19 | Burnley | 42 | 11 | 14 | 17 | 67 | 79 | 0.848 | 36 | |
| 20 | West Ham United | 42 | 13 | 9 | 20 | 75 | 93 | 0.806 | 35 | |
| 21 | Chesterfield (R) | 42 | 12 | 10 | 20 | 61 | 84 | 0.726 | 34 | Relegation to the Third Division North |

Rules for classification: 1) Points; 2) Goal average; 3) Goals scored
(R) Relegated

=== Match results ===
Key

- In Result column, Burnley's score shown first
- H = Home match
- A = Away match
- pen. = Penalty kick
- o.g. = Own goal

Results

| Date | Opponents | Result | Goalscorers | Attendance |
|---|---|---|---|---|
| 27 August 1932 | Chesterfield (H) | 1–1 | Forrest | 8,935 |
| 30 August 1932 | Preston North End (A) | 1–6 | Crompton | 12,732 |
| 3 September 1932 | Bradford (A) | 4–0 | Harker, Kelly (2), Mee | 11,020 |
| 5 September 1932 | Preston North End (H) | 4–0 | C. Smith, Kelly (2), Mee | 14,271 |
| 10 September 1932 | Plymouth Argyle (H) | 1–1 | Fairhurst (pen.) | 12,438 |
| 17 September 1932 | Nottingham Forest (A) | 1–1 | Harker | 9,736 |
| 24 September 1932 | Charlton Athletic (H) | 0–1 | | 10,657 |
| 1 October 1932 | Stoke City (A) | 0–3 | | 13,056 |
| 8 October 1932 | Manchester United (H) | 2–3 | Prest, Forrest (pen.) | 5,314 |
| 15 October 1932 | Tottenham Hotspur (A) | 1–4 | Prest | 26,097 |
| 22 October 1932 | Fulham (H) | 3–3 | Mee, Fairhurst, Jones | 6,603 |
| 29 October 1932 | West Ham United (A) | 4–4 | Jones (4) | 12,009 |
| 5 November 1932 | Lincoln City (H) | 0–0 | | 9,046 |
| 12 November 1932 | Bradford City (A) | 1–2 | Bicknell (o.g.) | 11,378 |
| 19 November 1932 | Port Vale (H) | 1–1 | Edwards | 7,940 |
| 26 November 1932 | Millwall (A) | 1–4 | Edwards | 10,865 |
| 3 December 1932 | Southampton (H) | 2–0 | Jones, Edwards | 7,139 |
| 10 December 1932 | Notts County (A) | 2–4 | Crompton (2) | 8,216 |
| 17 December 1932 | Swansea Town (H) | 1–2 | Jones | 6,637 |
| 24 December 1932 | Bury (A) | 3–5 | Crompton, Reynolds, Jones | 7,789 |
| 26 December 1932 | Grimsby Town (A) | 2–1 | Harker, Reynolds | 11,186 |
| 27 December 1932 | Grimsby Town (H) | 2–0 | Harker (2) | 13,602 |
| 31 December 1932 | Chesterfield (A) | 0–6 | | 8,403 |
| 7 January 1933 | Bradford (H) | 2–0 | C. Smith, Jones | 7,460 |
| 21 January 1933 | Plymouth Argyle (A) | 0–4 | | 11,529 |
| 31 January 1933 | Nottingham Forest (H) | 3–3 | C. Smith, Crompton (2) | 4,845 |
| 4 February 1933 | Charlton Athletic (A) | 2–2 | Crompton, Richmond | 7,777 |
| 11 February 1933 | Stoke City (H) | 1–2 | C. Smith | 12,228 |
| 22 February 1933 | Manchester United (A) | 1–2 | C. Smith | 18,533 |
| 8 March 1933 | Fulham (A) | 1–2 | Jones | 11,506 |
| 11 March 1933 | West Ham United (H) | 4–0 | C. Smith (3), Hancock | 10,771 |
| 18 March 1933 | Lincoln City (A) | 4–1 | C. Smith, Mustard, Jones (2) | 8,617 |
| 25 March 1933 | Bradford City (H) | 0–0 | | 12,228 |
| 1 April 1933 | Port Vale (A) | 1–1 | C. Smith | 7,221 |
| 8 April 1933 | Millwall (H) | 3–0 | C. Smith, Mustard, Jones | 8,691 |
| 14 April 1933 | Oldham Athletic (H) | 1–1 | Mustard (pen.) | 13,787 |
| 15 April 1933 | Southampton (A) | 1–3 | C. Smith | 7,302 |
| 17 April 1933 | Oldham Athletic (A) | 2–2 | Hancock, C. Smith | 13,501 |
| 22 April 1933 | Notts County (H) | 2–1 | Hancock, Reynolds | 7,665 |
| 24 April 1933 | Tottenham Hotspur (H) | 1–1 | Jones | 11,353 |
| 29 April 1933 | Swansea Town (A) | 0–2 | | 3,843 |
| 6 May 1933 | Bury (H) | 1–0 | Jones | 5,697 |

== FA Cup ==
=== Match results ===
Key

- In Result column, Burnley's score shown first
- H = Home match
- A = Away match
- pen. = Penalty kick
- o.g. = Own goal
- — = Attendance not known

Results

| Round | Date | Opponents | Result | Goalscorers | Attendance |
|---|---|---|---|---|---|
| Third round | 14 January 1933 | Swindon Town (A) | 2–1 | Harker, C. Smith | — |
| Fourth round | 28 January 1933 | Sheffield United (H) | 3–1 | Mee (2), C. Smith | 25,380 |
| Fifth round | 18 February 1933 | Chesterfield (H) | 1–0 | Hancock | 31,699 |
| Quarter final | 4 March 1933 | Manchester City (H) | 0–1 | | 48,717 |

== Player details ==
=== Player statistics ===
| Player | Position | Second Division | | FA Cup | | Total |
| Player | Position | Apps | Goals | Apps | Goals | Apps | Goals |
|---|---|---|---|---|---|---|---|
| George Bellis | HB | 23 | 0 | 3 | 0 | 26 | 0 |
| Ray Bennion | HB | 24 | 0 | 4 | 0 | 28 | 0 |
| Stan Bowsher | HB | 5 | 0 | 1 | 0 | 6 | 0 |
| James Brown | HB | 19 | 0 | 0 | 0 | 19 | 0 |
| Herman Conway | GK | 23 | 0 | 2 | 0 | 25 | 0 |
| Wilf Crompton | OF | 25 | 7 | 3 | 0 | 28 | 7 |
| Reg Edwards | CF | 6 | 3 | 0 | 0 | 6 | 3 |
| Dick Fairhurst | HB | 14 | 2 | 0 | 0 | 14 | 2 |
| Alex Forrest | HB | 28 | 2 | 4 | 0 | 32 | 2 |
| John Hall | OF | 1 | 0 | 0 | 0 | 1 | 0 |
| Ted Hancock | IF | 15 | 3 | 2 | 1 | 17 | 4 |
| Billy Harker | IF | 15 | 5 | 2 | 1 | 17 | 6 |
| Charlie Hillam | GK | 19 | 0 | 2 | 0 | 21 | 0 |
| Billy Jeavons | OF | 1 | 0 | 0 | 0 | 1 | 0 |
| Evan Jenkins | OF | 0 | 0 | 1 | 0 | 1 | 0 |
| Tommy Jones | IF | 40 | 16 | 4 | 0 | 44 | 16 |
| Jack Kelly | CF | 10 | 2 | 0 | 0 | 10 | 2 |
| Tom Manns | HB | 10 | 0 | 0 | 0 | 10 | 0 |
| Georgie Mee | OF | 18 | 3 | 3 | 2 | 21 | 5 |
| Clifford Merrick | HB | 1 | 0 | 0 | 0 | 1 | 0 |
| Jack Mustard | OF | 9 | 3 | 0 | 0 | 9 | 3 |
| Tommy Prest | IF | 14 | 2 | 0 | 0 | 14 | 2 |
| Wally Reynolds | OF | 19 | 3 | 1 | 0 | 20 | 3 |
| Gilbert Richmond | FB | 24 | 1 | 4 | 0 | 28 | 1 |
| Jack Schofield | HB | 2 | 0 | 0 | 0 | 2 | 0 |
| Cecil Smith | CF | 27 | 14 | 4 | 2 | 31 | 16 |
| Ernie Smith | IF | 19 | 0 | 0 | 0 | 19 | 0 |
| George Waterfield | FB | 36 | 0 | 3 | 0 | 39 | 0 |
| Tom Willighan | FB | 22 | 0 | 1 | 0 | 23 | 0 |
| William Wood | FB | 2 | 0 | 0 | 0 | 2 | 0 |
| William Wood | OF | 7 | 0 | 0 | 0 | 7 | 0 |
