= 1930–31 Nelson F.C. season =

Nelson
1930–31 season
- Manager: Jack English
- Football League Third Division North: 22nd (failed re-election)
- FA Cup: Second round
- Top goalscorer: League: Leslie Raisbeck (11); All: Leslie Raisbeck (15)
- Highest home attendance: 5,128 (vs Hull City, 2 September 1930)
- Lowest home attendance: 1,323 (vs Southport, 18 April 1931)
- Average home league attendance: 2,412
Home colours

The 1930–31 season was the 50th season in the history of Nelson Football Club, and their tenth and final as a member of The Football League. As they had done in 1927–28, the team finished bottom of the Third Division North, with a record of 6 wins, 7 draws and 29 defeats giving them a total of 19 points. As a result, Nelson were forced to apply for re-election to the League. The application was not successful; in a recount following a tied vote, Chester received one more vote than Nelson and subsequently took their place in the Third Division North for the 1931–32 season. Nelson were poor throughout the season, and lost all 22 league and cup matches away from home. They fell to the bottom of the table on 26 December 1930 and remained there until the end of the season. The 0–4 defeat away at Hull City on 2 May 1931 was to be their last match in the Football League.

Nelson also entered the 1930–31 FA Cup, and reached the Second Round for the second time in their history. After defeating North Eastern League side Workington in the First Round, Nelson were knocked out by York City following a replay. The team's top goalscorer was Leslie Raisbeck, a new signing from Stockport County, who scored a total of 15 goals in all competitions. The average attendance at Seedhill was just over 2,400, by far the lowest average during Nelson's spell in the Football League.

== Football League ==
Pos	Team	Pld	W	D	L	GF	GA	GAv	Pts	Promotion or relegation
18	Crewe Alexandra	42	14	6	22	66	93	0.710	34	
19	New Brighton	42	13	7	22	49	76	0.645	33	
20	Hartlepools United	42	12	6	24	67	86	0.779	30	
21	Rochdale	42	12	6	24	62	107	0.579	30	Re-elected
22	Nelson (R)	42	6	7	29	43	113	0.381	19	Failed re-election and demoted

Source: rsssf.com
(R) Relegated

=== Key ===
- H = Home match
- A = Away match
- In Result column, Nelson's score shown first

=== Match results ===
Date	Opponents	Result	Goalscorers	Attendance
30 August 1930	Rochdale (A)	4–5	Bate (3), Carmedy	4,822
2 September 1930	Hull City (H)	0–2		5,128
6 September 1930	Darlington (H)	3–1	Bate (2), Howarth	3,299
10 September 1930	Lincoln City (H)	1–2	Howarth	3,955
13 September 1930	Halifax Town (A)	0–1		5,433
15 September 1930	Lincoln City (A)	0–2		6,741
20 September 1930	New Brighton (H)	2–2	Hawes, Robinson	2,585
27 September 1930	Stockport County (A)	0–1		6,822
4 October 1930	Gateshead (H)	2–2	Raisbeck (2)	2,321
11 October 1930	Doncaster Rovers (A)	0–2		3,542
18 October 1930	Crewe Alexandra (A)	2–4	Raisbeck, Robinson	4,143
25 October 1930	Accrington Stanley (H)	4–2	Carmedy (3), Raisbeck	2,756
1 November 1930	Tranmere Rovers (A)	1–7	Bate	3,257
8 November 1930	Carlisle United (H)	1–2	Carmedy	2,737
15 November 1930	York City (A)	0–3		3,874
22 November 1930	Rotherham United (H)	0–0		1,606
6 December 1930	Barrow (H)	0–3		2,154
20 December 1930	Wrexham (H)	2–0	Raisbeck, Robinson	1,685
25 December 1930	Hartlepools United (A)	0–4		4,518
26 December 1930	Hartlepools United (H)	1–1	Carmedy	2,267
27 December 1930	Rochdale (H)	0–0		2,774
1 January 1931	Southport (A)	1–8	Raisbeck	4,534
3 January 1931	Darlington (A)	1–2	Raisbeck	2,585
10 January 1931	Chesterfield (A)	1–2	Harker	5,296
17 January 1931	Halifax Town (H)	3–2	Harker, Hawes, Martin	2,462
24 January 1931	New Brighton (A)	0–2		2,227
31 January 1931	Stockport County (H)	1–1	Harker	1,593
7 February 1931	Gateshead (A)	0–2		3,161
14 February 1931	Doncaster Rovers (H)	2–0	Harker, Raisbeck	2,304
21 February 1931	Crewe Alexandra (H)	1–1	Hawes	2,232
28 February 1931	Accrington Stanley (A)	1–3	Raisbeck	2,216
7 March 1931	Tranmere Rovers (H)	0–4		1,546
14 March 1931	Carlisle United (A)	1–8	Harker	3,468
21 March 1931	York City (H)	2–5	Dixon, Raisbeck	1,645
28 March 1931	Rotherham United (A)	0–3		3,442
3 April 1931	Wigan Borough (H)	2–1	Raisbeck, Tebb	1,666
4 April 1931	Chesterfield (H)	0–5		1,827
6 April 1931	Wigan Borough (A)	1–3	Seabrook (o.g.)	2,943
11 April 1931	Barrow (A)	1–2	Carmedy	5,307
18 April 1931	Southport	1–4	Manock	1,323
25 April 1931	Wrexham (A)	1–5	Tebb	1,413
2 May 1931	Hull City (A)	0–4		4,542

== FA Cup ==
=== Match results ===
Round	Date	Opponents	Result	Goalscorers	Attendance
First round	29 November 1930	Workington (H)	4–0	Hawes, Raisbeck (3)	2,600
Second round	13 December 1930	York City (H)	1–1	Allen	3,000
Second round replay	18 December 1930	York City (A)	2–3	Raisbeck, Robinson	2,206

== Player statistics ==
Key to positions

- CF = Centre forward
- FB = Fullback
- GK = Goalkeeper
- HB = Half-back
- IF = Inside forward
- OF = Outside forward

Statistics

Nat.	Position	Player	Third Division North		FA Cup		Total
Nat.	Position	Player	Apps	Goals	Apps	Goals	Apps	Goals
(England)	IF	Frank Allen	14	0	3	1	17	1
(England)	HB	Len Baker	7	0	0	0	7	0
(England)	CF	Arthur Bate	24	6	2	0	26	6
(England)	HB	James Caine	3	0	0	0	3	0
(England)	OF	Tom Carmedy	29	7	1	0	30	7
(England)	OF	Ralph Chapman	4	0	0	0	4	0
(England)	FB	Harry Counsell	3	0	0	0	3	0
(England)	OF	Arthur Dawson	10	0	0	0	10	0
(England)	HB	Charlie Dixon	16	1	0	0	16	1
(England)	FB	Billy Fairhurst	36	0	3	0	39	0
(England)	IF	Billy Harker	18	5	0	0	18	5
(England)	IF	Arthur Hawes	26	3	3	1	29	4
(England)	GK	Charlie Hillam	3	0	0	0	3	0
(England)	OF	Archie Howarth	8	2	0	0	8	2
(England)	HB	George Howes	35	0	3	0	38	0
(England)	OF	John Jewell	3	0	0	0	3	0
(England)	IF	Edward Manock	5	1	0	0	5	1
(England)	HB	Jack Martin	27	1	3	0	30	1
(England)	CF	Robert Nuttall	4	0	0	0	4	0
(England)	CF	Leslie Raisbeck	29	11	3	4	32	15
(England)	FB	Gilbert Richmond	16	0	0	0	16	0
(England)	FB	Ernie Robinson	27	0	3	0	30	0
(England)	OF	Henry Robinson	20	3	3	1	23	4
(England)	HB	Charles Sandbach	2	0	0	0	2	0
(Scotland)	GK	Peter Shevlin	16	0	2	0	18	0
(Scotland)	HB	David Suttie	38	0	3	0	41	0
(England)	IF	Tommy Tebb	14	2	0	0	14	2
(England)	CF	Stan Walker	2	0	0	0	2	0
(England)	GK	Sam Warhurst	23	0	1	0	24	0

== See also ==
- List of Nelson F.C. seasons
