= List of Wigan Borough F.C. players =

Wigan Borough F.C. was an English football club based in the town of Wigan. The club was founded in 1920 and joined the Lancashire Combination. In 1921, Borough turned professional when their application was accepted to play in the inaugural season of the newly formed Football League Third Division North. The team played in the Football League for ten seasons, with their most successful season coming in 1928–29, finishing fourth in the league and reaching the third round of the FA Cup. Wigan Borough folded during the 1931–32 season due to financial problems, and League football did not return to the town until Wigan Athletic F.C. were elected into the Football League in 1978.

The following list contains all the players who made at least one appearance for the club in the Football League. Appearances and goals for the 1931–32 season are also included, but have been expunged from official records.

Positions
GK	Goalkeeper
FB	Full back
HB	Half back
IF	Inside forward
OF	Outside forward
CF	Centre forward

Name	Nationality	Position	Club career	Appearances	Goals	Notes
Haughton Ackroyd	England	GK	1921–1922	5	0	
Len Armitage	England	CF	1923–1924	28	21	
Billy Ashurst	England	CF	1921–1922	5	0	
Geoffrey Bamforth	England	HB	1921	1	0	
Albert Barnett	England	IF	1926	3	0	
Harry Baron	England	HB	1921–1922	7	0	
Jimmy Barrington	England	FB	1925–1927	71	1	
William Barrowman	England	GK	1927–1928	5	0	
Frank Barson	England	HB	1930–1931	19	0	
John Berry	England	HB	1929	1	0	
Joseph Bibby	England	FB	1921–1922	9	0	
James Bimson	England	HB	1930–1931	41	1	
Ronnie Blake	England	HB	1925–1926	13	0	
John Boylen	Scotland	OF	1923	1	0	
Jimmy Bradley	England	HB	1924–1925	3	1	
Tom Brandon	England	FB	1925	8	0	
George Brodie	Scotland	IF	1921–1922	11	2	
William Bromilow	England	GK	1921–1922	33	0	
John Broster	England	HB	1921–1922	31	3	
Edward Brown	England	OF	1921	1	0	
James Brown	England	HB	1924–1925	6	0	
John Bryce	Scotland	FB	1927	3	0	
John Callagher	Scotland	HB	1925–1926	8	2	
Joe Campbell	England	OF	1921–1922	7	0	
Thomas Capper	England	GK	1923	5	0	
Dick Carlisle	England	HB	1921–1922	32	3	
James Cherry	England	OF	1931	4	0	(Note: All appearances were made during the 1931–32 season in which the club folded, and have been expunged from official records.)
Billy Chesser	England	IF	1921–1922	13	1	
Ernie Cockle	England	IF	1928–1931	75	16	
Henry Codd	Wales	HB	1929–1930	26	0	
Sammy Collier	England	GK	1925–1930	12	0	
Leigh Collins	England	HB	1921–1923	5	0	
Bob Collins	England	CF	1930–1931	19	7	
Charlie Cook	Scotland	OF	1924	3	0	
George Cooke	England	OF	1926–1928	61	10	
Billy Crewe	England	IF	1930–1931	24	4	
Sam Currie	Scotland	FB	1922–1924	33	2	
Tom Davis	?	OF	1923–1924	7	1	
Billy Dennis	England	FB	1928–1930	67	0	
Harry Dennison	England	IF	1922–1923	30	13	
Billy Dickinson	England	IF	1925–1928	104	61	
Owen Dorrans	Scotland	IF	1931	17	4	
Billy Down	England	GK	1930	2	0	
John Dunn	Scotland	IF	1925–1926	13	6	
Tommy Eatock	England	OF	1921–1923	10	1	
Harry Entwistle	England	HB	1931	2	0	
Billy Fairhurst	England	GK	1930–1931	22	0	
Harry Fare	England	FB	1922–1925	112	12	
Tom Fenner	England	IF	1924–1928	92	36	
Alex Ferguson	Scotland	GK	1924–1925	1	0	
Andy Findlay	England	HB	1922–1924	30	0	
Jimmy Finney	England	HB	1927–1929	7	0	
William Fisher	England	HB	1927–1928	4	0	
John Flanagan	England	IF	1930	1	0	
Tom Fleming	Scotland	FB	1925–1927	22	0	
Hugh Forshaw	England	CF	1925–1926	1	1	
Paul Fort	England	FB	1922–1923	1	0	
Bert Freeman	England	CF	1921–1922	25	13	
Richard Gaskell	England	CF	1926–1927	3	1	
Teddy Glover	England	FB	1927–1928	10	0	
Billy Glover	England	IF	1923–1926	94	33	
John Goodwin	Scotland	GK	1924–1925, 1926	44	0	
Henry Green	England	HB	1928–1929	3	0	
Billy Green	England	FB	1929–1930	12	0	
Walter Hale	England	FB	1925	1	0	
Jack Hallam	England	HB	1931	12	1	
Chris Harrington	England	OF	1922–1923	21	4	
Thomas Harris	England	IF	1928–1929	24	8	
Albert Harrison	England	HB	1922–1923	6	0	
Arthur Hartley	England	FB	1930–1931	7	0	
Thomas Helsby	England	HB	1925–1926	29	0	
Billy Herbert	England	IF	1921–1922	24	6	
Ted Heyes	England	GK	1922–1925	34	0	
Richard Higson	England	GK	1923–1924	2	0	
John Hobson	England	HB	1921–1922	3	0	
Frank Hodges	England	OF	1921–1922	33	5	
Joe Hodgkinson	England	FB	1926	1	0	
William Hornby	England	CF	1921–1922	1	1	
Stan Horrocks	England	HB	1930–1931	16	0	
John Houghton	England	FB	1921–1922	29	0	
Bobby Hughes	England	OF	1928–1930	66	15	
Bert Humpish	England	HB	1925–1929	161	15	
Alex Hunter	Scotland	GK	1922–1924	39	0	
Henry Hurst	England	HB	1931	2	0	
John Ingram	England	IF	1929–1930	11	1	
Bill Jenkinson	England	FB	1921	11	0	
Jack Jennings	England	HB	1923–1925	47	1	
Jimmy Jepson	England	CF	1930–1931	35	28	
Alf Jewett	England	HB	1926	1	0	
George Johnson	England	FB	1925	3	0	
Joe Johnson	England	IF	1930–1931	30	9	
Dickie Jones	Wales	HB	1926	1	0	
George Jones	England	OF	1923–1925	89	7	
Sammy Julian	England	FB	1931	11	0	
Jimmy Keen	England	OF	1925–1926	12	0	
Thomas Kelly	England	CF	1930	1	0	
Jack Kershaw	England	FB	1921–1924	41	1	
Billy Kettle	England	IF	1924–1925	39	13	
Ernest Kidd	England	OF	1922–1923	26	0	
Mick Kilhoury	England	IF	1930–1931	17	4	
John Knight	England	OF	1921–1922	15	0	
Denis Lawson	Scotland	OF	1927–1928	28	2	
Albert Leeming	England	OF	1924–1925	1	0	
Charles Leigh	England	HB	1923–1924	2	0	
Bert Lewins	England	FB	1930–1931	26	0	
Wilfred Lievesley	England	IF	1928–1929	26	13	
Tommy Lindsay	Scotland	OF	1928–1929	22	5	
Tommy MacDonald	Scotland	CF	1921	1	0	
Tom MacIntyre	Scotland	OF	1922–1923	5	1	
James McCrae	Scotland	HB	1923–1924	32	5	
Jimmy McGraham	England	HB	1923–1924	34	1	
John McGuire	England	CF	1926–1927	33	13	
Tommy Mandy	England	OF	1925–1930	77	17	
Jack Marshall	England	HB	1924–1925, 1926	41	2	
Jack Martin	England	HB	1931	12	0	
Arthur Mercer	England	IF	1922–1925	39	16	
Jackie Mittell	Wales	GK	1929–1930, 1931	70	0	
Tommy Moon	England	OF	1931	10	1	
Jack Moran	England	FB	1925–1931	201	0	
Harry Morris	England	HB	1924–1925	15	0	
William Morton	England	IF	1923–1924	10	1	
Jimmy Murphy	England	OF	1931	2	0	
Michael Murray	Scotland	OF	1930–1931	27	2	
Pat Nelis	Ireland	IF	1925–1926	16	1	
Alf Oakes	England	IF	1931	11	4	
Arthur Ormston	England	CF	1924–1925	19	5	
Tommy Pearson	England	IF	1930–1931	5	2	
Jack Pendleton	England	HB	1922–1924	39	1	
Arthur Phoenix	England	HB	1929–1930	25	0	
Albert Potter	England	FB	1927–1929	67	4	
Charles Preedy	England	GK	1928–1929	41	0	
Peter Pursell	Scotland	HB	1924–1926	35	0	
George Rae	Scotland	IF	1923–1924	19	1	
Herbert Reddyhough	England	CF	1929	3	1	
Jimmy Riddell	Scotland	HB	1925–1928	88	2	
Will Rigby	England	OF	1930–1931	8	1	
William Rigby	England	CF	1921–1922	15	6	
Arthur Rimmer	England	FB	1930	1	0	
David Robb	Scotland	HB	1926–1930	107	3	
Leslie Russell	England	FB	1930–1931	19	0	
Ernie Salt	England	GK	1925–1926	26	0	
Stan Sayer	England	CF	1925–1926	16	7	
Bob Scorer	England	HB	1925–1926	21	0	
Jimmy Scullion	Scotland	IF	1930–1931	27	11	
Tommy Scully	England	FB	1921	6	0	
Tommy Scurr	England	OF	1929–1930	19	6	
Eddie Seabrook	England	HB	1930–1931	4	0	
Peter Sedgwick	England	HB	1921–1922	4	0	
Sammy Sharp	England	HB	1931	4	0	
George Shaw	England	OF	1927	2	0	
Bert Shears	England	HB	1931	4	0	
Frank Sheldon	England	IF	1926–1927	2	1	
John Simmons	England	IF	1930	2	0	
Bert Simpson	England	OF	1924–1926	69	7	
Andy Smith	England	IF	1924	3	1	
Cecil Smith	Wales	CF	1928–1930	38	22	
Harry Spencer	England	IF	1922–1924	35	7	
Albert Stevenson	Scotland	CF	1924–1925	7	2	
Arthur Stevenson	England	OF	1922–1923, 1931	45	2	
Bob Stewart	Scotland	FB	1923	3	0	
Jimmy Swift	England	IF	1924	1	0	
Tommy Tebb	England	IF	1931	6	0	
James Thomas	England	HB	1922	1	0	
Charles Tilbrook	England	IF	1927–1928	1	0	
James Twiss	England	CF	1921–1922	7	3	
Albert Valentine	England	CF	1931	12	1	
Bill Wade	England	FB	1931	8	0	
John Wakefield	England	IF	1928–1929	1	0	
Jimmy Walker	Scotland	IF	1927–1928	8	1	
Fred Ward	England	FB	1923–1925	70	0	
Arthur Welsby	England	OF	1924–1931	220	31	
Billy Welsh	Scotland	IF	1928–1930	55	16	
Cecil White	England	HB	1930–1931	32	0	
Frank Whitfield	England	HB	1922–1924	68	6	
Archie Williams	England	CF	1922–1924	24	10	
Owen Williams	Wales	HB	1921–1922, 1924	58	0	
Tom Wilson	England	HB	1926–1930	108	4	
Tommy Wilson	England	IF	1930–1931	5	2	
William Winter	England	GK	1926–1929	85	0	
Wilf Woodcock	England	IF	1924–1925	14	2	
Fred Woodward	England	HB	1921–1922	3	0	
George Yates	England	CF	1926–1928	35	10	
