= 1982–83 in English football =

Football in England
- Season: 1982–83

Men's football
- First Division: Liverpool
- Second Division: Queens Park Rangers
- Third Division: Portsmouth
- Fourth Division: Wimbledon
- Alliance Premier League: Enfield
- FA Cup: Manchester United
- Football League Trophy: Millwall
- League Cup: Liverpool
- Charity Shield: Liverpool

The 1982–83 season was the 103rd season of competitive football in England.

== Diary of the season ==
11 August 1982: Tottenham Hotspur pay Bristol Rovers £105,000 for defender Gary Mabbutt, who turns 21 later this month.

19 August 1982: Newcastle United pay Southampton £100,000 for Kevin Keegan.

21 August 1982: Liverpool beat Tottenham Hotspur 1–0 in the Charity Shield at Wembley with a goal from Ian Rush.

24 August 1982: The Shankly Gates are unveiled at Anfield, honouring former Liverpool manager Bill Shankly almost a year after his death.

25 August 1982: Arsenal sign 22-year-old striker Lee Chapman from Stoke City for £500,000.

26 August 1982: Bob Paisley announces that this season as Liverpool manager, his ninth in charge, will be his last.

28 August 1982: The first games of the First Division season are played. Manchester United achieve the biggest win of the opening day of the season beating Birmingham City 3–0. Peter Shilton exits Nottingham Forest in a £325,000 move to Southampton. In the Second Division, Kevin Keegan scores on his Newcastle debut in a 1–0 home win over QPR.

4 September 1982: Manchester City's victory over Watford ensures the Maine Road side are top of the table and the only First Division side with a 100% record after three games. Their win comes despite having outfield player Bobby McDonald as goalkeeper after Joe Corrigan is rendered unavailable after just three minutes. Paul Walsh scores his first three goals for Luton Town against Notts County as the Hatters win 5–3. Bob Latchford scores three of Swansea City's four without reply against Norwich City, Southampton's Justin Fashanu, on loan from Nottingham Forest, scores the winning goal in a 1–0 victory Aston Villa, West Bromwich Albion beat Manchester United and a Liverpool win 2–0 at Arsenal.

9 September 1982: Peter Beardsley, a 21-year-old former Carlisle United playing for Vancouver Whitecaps in Canada, signs for Manchester United in a £325,000 deal.

11 September 1982: Watford, in the First Division for the first time, go top of the league on goal difference (level with Manchester United and Manchester City) by beating West Bromwich Albion 3–0 in their fifth league game of the season. Ron Atkinson's side beat Ipswich Town 3–1 at Old Trafford. A six-goal thriller at Anfield sees Liverpool draw 3–3 with Luton Town. Aston Villa beat Nottingham Forest 4–1 at Villa Park. Stoke City beat Swansea City 4–1 at the Victoria Ground. West Ham United beat Birmingham City 5–0 at Upton Park. In the Second Division, Steve Lynex and Gary Lineker score hat-tricks in Leicester City's 6–0 home win over Carlisle United. A Yorkshire derby at Hillsborough sees Leeds United beat Sheffield Wednesday 3–2.

18 September 1982: Manchester United go top of the First Division with a 1–0 win over Southampton at The Dell. Liverpool go second with a 3–0 win over Swansea City at the Vetch Field. Stoke City go fourth by beating Ipswich Town 3–2 at Portman Road.

22 September 1982: England draw 2–2 with Denmark in Copenhagen in their opening 1984 European Championship qualifier, their first game under the management of Bobby Robson.

25 September 1982: Watford beat Sunderland 8–0 at Vicarage Road, with Luther Blissett scoring four goals and Ross Jenkins and Nigel Callaghan both scoring twice. Liverpool go top of the First Division with a 5–0 home win over Southampton after Manchester United are held to a goalless draw at home to Arsenal. Luton Town are the First Division's top scorers so far with 20 goals from their first seven games after drawing 4-4 at Stoke. Coventry City win 4–2 at home to Everton. There are 4–1 wins at home for Tottenham Hotspur against Nottingham Forest and West Ham United against Manchester City. In all, today's 11 First Division fixtures have produced a total of 50 goals.

30 September 1982: The month ends with defending champions Liverpool top of the First Division, with Manchester United in second place. Watford occupy third place, West Ham United and Tottenham Hotspur complete the top five, and Southampton, Birmingham City and Norwich City occupy the bottom three places. In the Second Division, surprise promotion contenders Grimsby Town head the race for a place in the First Division, joined by Wolverhampton Wanderers and Sheffield Wednesday in the top three.

2 October 1982: Liverpool's unbeaten start to the season ends when they are beaten 1–0 by Ipswich Town at Portman Road. However, Bob Paisley's men are still top of the First Division on goal difference after Manchester United are held to a 1–1 draw by Luton Town at Kenilworth Road.

6 October 1982: Nottingham Forest smash six past West Bromwich Albion in the League Cup.

9 October 1982: Manchester United go top of the First Division with a 1–0 home win over Stoke City, while Liverpool crash down to fifth place with a 3–1 defeat away to West Ham, who go second.

13 October 1982: Karl-Heinz Rummenigge scores twice as West Germany beat England 2–1 in a friendly at Wembley.

16 October 1982: Manchester United stay top of the First Division after a goalless draw with Liverpool at Anfield. West Ham squander the chance to go top by losing 3–0 at Southampton.

23 October 1982: First Division leaders Manchester United draw 2–2 in the Manchester derby at Old Trafford. West Ham miss another chance to go top of the league when they lose 3–1 to Brighton at the Goldstone Ground. West Bromwich Albion go second with a 1–0 home win over Luton Town. Fulham go top of the Second Division and look well-placed for a second successive promotion after winning 3–1 at home to Burnley.

30 October 1982: Liverpool go top of the First Division after they beat Brighton 3–1 at Anfield, while West Ham go second with a 3–1 home win over Manchester United. The top three are all level on 22 points after 12 games. West Bromwich Albion miss the chance to go top after they crash 6–1 at Ipswich.

6 November 1982: In the Merseyside derby at Goodison Park, Liverpool beat Everton 5–0 with four goals from Ian Rush and a further goal from Mark Lawrenson to maintain their lead of the First Division. West Ham's title hopes take a hit when they lose 5–2 at Stoke, as do Manchester United's with a 1–0 defeat at Brighton. Manchester City take advantage to go second with a 2–0 win over Southampton at Maine Road. Ipswich Town, runners-up in the league for the last two seasons, are now fourth from bottom after a 2–1 defeat at Nottingham Forest.

10 November 1982: Colchester United striker John Lyons, 26, dies at his home in Essex; he is believed to have committed suicide.

13 November 1982: The Ballon d'Or award winner for 1977, Allan Simonsen, scores on his début for Charlton Athletic, who are beaten 3–2 by Middlesbrough in the Second Division. In the First Division, Liverpool maintain a three-point lead at the top by beating Coventry City 4–0 at Anfield. West Ham go second with a 1–0 home win over bottom-of-the-table Norwich City. Manchester United maintain their title push with a 1–0 home win over Tottenham, as do Watford by beating Stoke City by the same scoreline at Vicarage Road. There are six goals in a thrilling clash at The Hawthorns, where West Bromwich Albion draw 3–3 with Swansea City.

17 November 1982: England beat Greece 3–0 in Salonika in a European Championship qualifier.

20 November 1982: The FA Cup first round ties produce giant-killing victories against Football League opposition for non-league sides Altrincham, Boston United, North Shields, Bishop's Stortford and Slough Town. Liverpool are now four points ahead at the top of First Division with a 2–1 win over Notts County at Meadow Lane. Watford go second with a 4–1 win at home to Brighton. Manchester United's title hopes are hit by a 2–1 away defeat to Aston Villa. Manchester City's hopes are hit by a goalless draw at home to struggling Birmingham City.

25 November 1982: Derby County are fined £10,000 and "warned as to their future conduct" by the Football League over breaches of two regulations relating to illicit negotiations with Roy McFarland, who resigns his post as player-manager at Bradford City to return to the club for a second spell as a player.

27 November 1982: The First Division title race sees Liverpool maintain their four-point lead over Watford, as Bob Paisley's team triumph 3–0 at home to Tottenham and Graham Taylor's side beat Arsenal 4–2 at Highbury.

30 November 1982: Liverpool remain top of the First Division as November draws to a close, four points ahead of second-placed Watford. Nottingham Forest, Manchester United and West Ham United complete the top five, while the bottom three clubs remain unchanged from the end of last month. Queens Park Rangers, Fulham and Sheffield Wednesday head the Second Division promotion race.

4 December 1982: Leaders Liverpool suffer a shock 1–0 defeat to Norwich City at Carrow Road. Manchester United go second with a 1–0 at Watford. Aston Villa go third with a 1–0 home win over West Ham. Nottingham Forest's title hopes are hit by a 3–2 defeat to local rivals Notts County at Meadow Lane. Down in the Second Division, Middlesbrough find themselves fifth from bottom and in real danger of a second consecutive relegation after they lose 4–0 at Wolves.

6 December 1982: Mike Bailey is sacked from his job as manager at Brighton & Hove Albion, reportedly because Albion's supporters deemed the team "too boring". Coach Jimmy Melia takes over. Millwall, bottom of the Third Division, appoint former Arsenal and Manchester United midfielder George Graham, 38, as their new manager.

11 December 1982: There is a major upset in the FA Cup second round as Third Division Wrexham lose 2–1 to non-league Worcester City. The gap between Liverpool and Manchester United at the top of the First Division remains three points wide after Bob Paisley guides his team to a 3–1 home win over Watford, and Ron Atkinson watches his side put four without reply past Notts County at Old Trafford. Nottingham Forest revive their title challenge with a 2–1 home win over Swansea City.

12 December 1982: Aston Villa lose the Intercontinental Cup final 2–0 to Uruguayan side Penarol in Tokyo.

15 December 1982: England beat Luxembourg 9–0 at Wembley in the European Championship qualifiers. Luther Blissett scores a hat-trick on his England debut and becomes the nation's first black goalscorer. Débutant Mark Chamberlain is also on the scoresheet.

18 December 1982: Liverpool extend their lead of the First Division to five points with a 4–2 away win over Aston Villa, while Manchester United can only manage a goalless away draw with Swansea City. In the Second Division promotion race, Wolves beat leaders QPR 4–0 at the Molineux to cut the gap between first and second place to three points. Wolves have a game in hand over the leaders and now have a superior goal difference.

22 December 1982: Everton sign 26-year-old midfielder Peter Reid from Bolton Wanderers in a £60,000 deal.

26 December 1982: With the 26th being on a Sunday for the last time until 1993, there are just two fixtures in the whole Football League. In the Second Division, promotion challengers Oldham Athletic and Leeds United draw 2–2 at Boundary Park. In the Third Division, there is a London derby at The Den, where Millwall lose 1–0 at home to Orient in a relegation crunch match.

27 December 1982: The last Boxing Day to fall on the 27th until 1993. Liverpool remain in pole position at the top of the First Division with a 5–2 home win over Manchester City. There is an East Anglian derby clash at Portman Road, where Norwich boost their survival bid with a 3–2 win over their Suffolk neighbours. Birmingham City are on the winning side at home to their neighbours Aston Villa, winning 3–0 to dent Tony Barton's team's hopes of winning a second league title in three seasons, while Birmingham's three points are vital in their battle to avoid relegation. Wolves go top of the Second Division with a 2–0 away win over Shrewsbury Town, as QPR lose 2–1 at home to London rivals Chelsea.

29 December 1982: Watford rise to third in the table with a win over West Ham, who move into fifth. At the lower reaches of the table, Norwich beat Luton and Birmingham draw with Swansea; all four clubs and Brighton are separated by four points. In the Second Division, QPR beat Charlton to go level on points with Wolverhampton Wanderers at the top of the table.

31 December 1982: The year ends with Liverpool's lead at the top of the First Division increased to six points, with Nottingham Forest their nearest challengers and Watford and Manchester United two points further back. Sunderland, Birmingham City and Brighton & Hove Albion occupy the bottom three places. An excellent month for Wolverhampton Wanderers has seen the Midlands side storm to the top of the Second Division, joined in the top three by Queens Park Rangers and Fulham.

1 January 1983: Alan Ball, aged 37 and the only England World Cup winner still playing, leaves Southampton on a free transfer and signs a contract with Bristol Rovers. Liverpool are now eight points ahead at the top of the First Division after beating Notts County 5–1 at Anfield, with Manchester United now their nearest challengers after a 3–1 home win over Aston Villa, while Watford are held to a 1–1 draw at Brighton and Nottingham Forest are unable to break the deadlock in their home clash with Sunderland which ends goalless. Wolves move closer to sealing an immediate return to the First Division by beating fellow promotion challengers Fulham 3–1 at Craven Cottage. Shrewsbury Town are now on the brink of the promotion places after a 2–0 win at home to Chelsea. Derby County, First Division champions eight seasons ago, are now bottom of the First Division and faced with huge debts and falling crowds.

4 January 1983: West Ham are now 13 points off the top of the First Division after losing 3–2 at home to Luton Town.

8 January 1983: Holders Tottenham Hotspur beat Southampton 1–0 in the FA Cup third round. Nottingham Forest are surprisingly beaten 2–0 by manager Brian Clough's former team, Second Division Derby County.

15 January 1983: Liverpool maintain their 10-point lead over their nearest title rivals Manchester United and Nottingham Forest by beating West Bromwich Albion 1–0 at The Hawthorns.

19 January 1983: Aston Villa lose 1–0 to Barcelona at the Nou Camp in the first leg of the European Super Cup. On the domestic scene, Manchester United remain in contention for all three domestic trophies by beating Nottingham Forest 4–0 in the Football League Cup quarter-final clash at Old Trafford. Tottenham suffer a shock 4–1 home defeat to Second Division strugglers Burnley in the same stage of the competition.

26 January 1983: Aston Villa clinch the European Super Cup by beating Barcelona 3–0 at Villa Park.

29 January 1983: Brighton beat Manchester City 4–0 in the FA Cup fourth round at the Goldstone Ground. Burnley continue their good cup form with a 3–1 home win over Swindon Town. Liverpool beat Stoke City 2–0 at Anfield and Manchester United beat Luton Town by the same scoreline at Kenilworth Road, keeping both of the victorious sides in contention for a unique domestic treble.

31 January 1983: As January ends, Liverpool are ten points clear at the top of the First Division, their nearest rivals now being Manchester United. Watford are third, level on points with Nottingham Forest, and Coventry City have moved into the top five. Brighton & Hove Albion and Birmingham City are still in the bottom three, but Sunderland have climbed out of the relegation zone at the expense of Norwich City. Wolverhampton Wanderers, Queens Park Rangers and Fulham continue to lead the way in the Second Division, with third placed Fulham now nine points ahead of their nearest challengers Sheffield Wednesday. At the other end of the table, fallen giants Derby County show no sign of improvement as they remain bottom of the division and are now eight points adrift of safety.

3 February 1983: John Bond resigns after more than two years as manager of Manchester City. Coach John Benson takes over on an interim basis.

5 February 1983: Liverpool extend their First Division lead to 12 points with a 3–1 away win over Luton Town, while Manchester United can only manage a 1–1 draw with Ipswich Town at Portman Road. In the Second Division, the top three of Wolves, QPR and Fulham look certain to win promotion, with more than 10 points separating them from their nearest challengers.

6 February 1983: Watford keep up the pressure on Liverpool with a 3–1 away win over Swansea City, who finished sixth in the First Division last season but are now just one point and one place outside the relegation zone.

12 February 1983: Liverpool are now 15 points ahead at the top of the First Division after beating Ipswich Town 1–0 at Anfield, but Manchester United have a game in hand over them. Coventry City go fifth with a 4–0 home win over Manchester City.

19 February 1983: Tottenham Hotspur lose their first FA Cup match since March 1980, 2–0 to Everton in the fifth round. Aston Villa beat Watford 4–1, while Norwich City beat Ipswich Town 1–0 in the East Anglian derby. Manchester United beat Derby County 1–0 at the Baseball Ground. In the First Division, Southampton remain in the hunt for a UEFA Cup place by beating Southampton 2–0 at The Dell. Manchester City's downturn continues with a 1–0 defeat at home to Notts County.

20 February 1983: Liverpool's hopes of a unique domestic treble are ended when they suffer a shock 2–1 home defeat against Brighton & Hove Albion in the FA Cup fifth round.

26 February 1983: Arsenal goalkeeper Pat Jennings, 37, becomes the first footballer to appear in 1,000 competitive games in England, reaching the milestone in a 0–0 league draw with West Bromwich Albion at The Hawthorns. Manchester United and Liverpool draw 1–1 at Old Trafford, allowing Watford to move into second place with a 2–1 home win over Aston Villa. Notts County move closer to securing a third successive season in the First Division by demolishing Coventry City 5–1 at Meadow Lane. Sunderland stay clear of the danger zone by inflicting a 3–2 defeat on Manchester City at Roker Park. Leicester City cast doubt on the seemingly certain promotion status of the Second Division's top three by beating Wolves 5–0 at Filbert Street.

28 February 1983: Liverpool now have a 14-point advantage at the top of the First Division, with Watford one place behind and with a game in hand. Manchester United, Nottingham Forest and Aston Villa complete the top five. The bottom three remain unchanged from the end of last month. Wolverhampton Wanderers, Queens Park Rangers and Fulham remain the leading force in the Second Division promotion race, but Leicester City are starting to put pressure on the leading pack. In the FA Cup fifth round replays, Arsenal beat Middlesbrough 3–2 at Highbury and Burnley beat Crystal Palace 1–0 at Turf Moor.

1 March 1983: Peter Beardsley leaves Manchester United and returns to Vancouver Whitecaps on a free transfer, having only made one appearance for the Old Trafford club. In the only First Division action of the day, Brighton win 2–1 at Swansea to draw level on points with their opponents in the battle against relegation. Second Division leaders Wolves at Sheffield Wednesday 1–0 at home.

2 March 1983: European action resumes with European Cup holders Aston Villa losing 2–1 at home to Juventus in the quarter-final first leg, while Liverpool's hopes of a fourth European Cup triumph in seven seasons are hit hard when they go down 2–0 to Polish champions Widzew Lodz. However, Bob Paisley's team still look assured to retain their league title after their nearest rivals Watford and Manchester United are both beaten away from home in the First Division, with Watford going down 3–0 to Norwich City at Carrow Road and Manchester United lose 1–0 away to a Stoke City side who are now pushing for UEFA Cup qualification for the first time in eight years. Everton miss the chance of break into the top five when they are held to a goalless draw by Manchester City at Maine Road.

5 March 1983: Liverpool continue their surge towards the First Division title with a 5–1 home win over Stoke City, although Watford keep up the pressure with a 1–0 win at Coventry, as do Manchester United who triumph 1–2 in the Manchester derby at Maine Road.

8 March 1983: Aston Villa go fourth in the First Division with a 2–0 home win over Notts County.

12 March 1983: Arsenal go through to the FA Cup semi-finals with a 2–0 home win over Aston Villa, as do Brighton with a 1–0 home win over Norwich City. Manchester United are in the semi-finals for the first time in four seasons after beating Everton 1–0 at Old Trafford. The fourth quarter-final clash ends in a 1–1 draw between Burnley and Sheffield Wednesday at Turf Moor. Leaders Liverpool beat West Ham 3–0 in the First Division. In the race for a UEFA Cup place, West Bromwich Albion beat Ipswich Town 4–1 at home. Manchester City, who were among the title contenders as recently as November, are now in danger of relegation after going down 4–1 at Swansea, a result which lifts the hosts out of the bottom three. An eight-goal thriller at Vicarage Road sees Watford beat Notts County 5-3.

15 March 1983: Birmingham City boost their survival hopes with a 2–1 home win over Arsenal. The race for a UEFA Cup place features a 2–0 home win for Everton over Southampton.

16 March 1983: Sheffield Wednesday thrash Burnley in the Hillsborough replay 5–0 to reach the FA Cup semi-finals for the first time since 1966.

22 March 1983: Manchester United keep their slim hopes of catching Liverpool alive by beating West Ham 2–1 at Old Trafford, as do Watford with a 2–1 home win over Birmingham City. Liverpool are held to a 2–2 draw at Brighton. The race for a UEFA Cup place features a 2–2 draw between Arsenal and Ipswich Town at Highbury. QPR move closer to ending their four-year exile from the First Division by beating Charlton Athletic 5–1 at Loftus Road. Leicester City's hopes of breaking into the top three are hit when Sheffield Wednesday hold them to a 2–2 draw at Hillsborough.

26 March 1983: Liverpool clinch the League Cup for the third season running by beating Manchester United 2–1 in the final at Wembley. Alan Kennedy and Ronnie Whelan score for Liverpool, and 17-year-old Norman Whiteside becomes the youngest scorer in a major Wembley final for United. On the same day, legendary former Manchester United player George Best signs for Third Division side AFC Bournemouth two months before his 37th birthday.

30 March 1983: England are held to a 0–0 draw by Greece at Wembley in a European Championship qualifier.

31 March 1983: Liverpool are looking all set to add the league title to their League Cup this season, as they end March as First Division leaders with a 13-point lead over nearest challengers Watford. Manchester United, Aston Villa and Southampton complete the top five. The bottom three clubs remain unchanged for the second month-end running. Queens Park Rangers have overhauled Wolverhampton Wanderers at the top of the Second Division, while Fulham remain third but still under pressure from a determined Leicester City side. Derby County are at last showing some sign of being able to avoid relegation as they are now just two points adrift of safety.

2 April 1983: Liverpool take another step towards title glory by beating Sunderland 1–0 at Anfield, although Manchester United keep up the pressure with a 3–0 home win over Coventry City. Watford's title hopes are now virtually dead after they lose 2–1 at West Ham.

4 April 1983: Tottenham give their hopes of qualifying for the UEFA Cup a huge boost by beating Arsenal 5–0 in the North London derby at White Hart Lane. Watford go second with a 5–2 home win over local rivals Luton Town, who remain second from bottom of the First Division. Manchester United are held to a goalless draw at Sunderland. In the Third Division, Newport County go top of the table with a 1–0 win over South Wales rivals Cardiff City in a promotion crunch game at Somerton Park, boosting the Monmouthshire side's chances of reaching the Second Division for only the second time in the club's history.

5 April 1983: Nottingham Forest go fifth in the First Division with a 2–1 win over Coventry City at Highfield Road. Brighton miss the chance to move out of the bottom three when they are held to a goalless draw at Southampton. West Ham's resurgence continues with a 5–1 away win over Swansea City, which puts them firmly back in the hunt for a UEFA Cup place and deepens the home side's relegation worries.

9 April 1983: Liverpool now need just five points from their last seven games to clinch the First Division title after beating Swansea City, managed by former Liverpool striker John Toshack, 3–0 at Anfield, a result which sends the Swans back into the bottom three. Luton Town climb out of the relegation zone at Swansea's expense by beating Aston Villa 2–1 at Kenilworth Road. Manchester United drop two points when Southampton hold them to a 1–1 draw at Old Trafford, but Watford help delay Liverpool's wait for the title by beating West Bromwich Albion 3–1 away from home. A relegation crunch game at St Andrew's sees Birmingham City lose 4–0 at home to Norwich City.

12 April 1983: Liverpool drop two points when Coventry City hold them to a goalless draw at Highfield Road. Time is running out for Birmingham City in their battle to avoid relegation when they go down 3–1 to Luton Town in a relegation crunch clash at Kenilworth Road.

16 April 1983: Manchester United reach their ninth FA Cup final with a 2–1 win over Arsenal at Villa Park. Brighton reach a cup final for the first time by winning the other semi-final 2–1 against Sheffield Wednesday at Highbury. Liverpool's wait for the First Division title is further delayed by a 3–2 defeat at Southampton. Norwich City move closer to safety with a 2–0 home win over Sunderland, while Birmingham City's survival bid is boosted by a 1–0 away win over Coventry City.

19 April 1983: Manchester United's 2–0 defeat at Everton means that Liverpool now need just one point from their final five league games to be sure of the title, while the win is also a boost to Howard Kendall's team in their challenge for a UEFA Cup place. FA Cup finalists Brighton move closer to relegation after being held to a 1–1 draw at Sunderland. QPR now need just two points from their final six Second Division games to secure promotion after a 1–0 away win over Sheffield Wednesday.

20 April 1983: Norwich City move closer to survival with a 3–1 home win over Arsenal. Newcastle United keep their faint promotion hopes alive in the Second Division by beating struggling Rotherham United 4–0 on Tyneside.

23 April 1983: Liverpool are made to wait for the league title after losing 2–0 at home to Norwich City, with Manchester United's 2–0 home win over Watford ensuring that Bob Paisley's team have to wait at least another game to seal the title. A Second Division promotion crunch game at Craven Cottage sees Leicester City beat Fulham 1–0 and cut the gap between third and fourth place to just two points. Meanwhile, Fulham's West London rivals QPR confirm their promotion with a 1–0 home win over Leeds United. Hull City are promoted from the Fourth Division with a 1–0 win over Crewe Alexandra at Boothferry Park.

27 April 1983: England beat Hungary 2–0 at Wembley in a European Championship qualifier.

30 April 1983: Manchester United's 1–1 draw at Norwich seals the First Division title for Liverpool, despite their 2–0 defeat to Tottenham at White Hart Lane. Nottingham Forest move closer to securing a UEFA Cup place with a 2–1 away win over Manchester City, which leaves the hosts on the brink of the relegation zone. Wolves beat Crystal Palace 1–0 in their Second Division clash at the Molineux, leaving them needing just two points from their final three games to secure an immediate return to the First Division. Wimbledon also seal an immediate return to the Third Division after beating Crewe Alexandra 2–0 at Gresty Road.

2 May 1983: Arsenal keep their hopes of qualifying for the UEFA Cup alive by beating Manchester United 3–0 at Highbury. FA Cup finalists Brighton slide closer to relegation after only being able to manage a 1–1 draw at Birmingham, a result which lifts the hosts out of the relegation zone at the expense of Manchester City. QPR clinch the Second Division title with a 3–1 home win over West London rivals Fulham, which promotes Wolves (who draw 3–3 with Charlton Athletic at The Valley) and allows Leicester City to go third on goal difference despite only being able to manage a 2–2 draw on their visit to Leeds United. Portsmouth miss the chance to seal promotion from the Third Division when Orient hold them to a 2–2 draw at Fratton Park.

3 May 1983: Cardiff City's promotion from the Third Division is delayed by a 3–0 defeat to Gillingham at Priestfield.

4 May 1983: Newcastle United keep their Second Division promotion push alive with a 5–0 win over Barnsley at Oakwell.

6 May 1983: Port Vale win promotion from the Fourth Division with a 2–0 win over Stockport County at Edgeley Park.

7 May 1983: FA Cup finalists Brighton are relegated from the First Division with a 1–0 defeat to Manchester City in the relegation crunch game at the Goldstone Ground. Swansea City's 2–1 defeat at Manchester United also sends them down, just one season after finishing sixth in the First Division. Birmingham City stay clear of the bottom three with a 2–0 home win over Tottenham. Coventry City arrest their alarming slide down the table and stay clear of the bottom three with a 3–0 win at Stoke. Portsmouth, Cardiff City and Huddersfield Town all seal promotion to the Second Division, with Huddersfield seeing off their last remaining promotion rivals Newport County 1–0 at Leeds Road.

8 May 1983: Millwall move closer to securing a remarkable escape from relegation in the Third Division by beating their London rivals Brentford 1–0 at The Den.

9 May 1983: Luton Town miss the chance to climb out of the bottom three when they lose their penultimate First Division game 3–0 to Manchester United at Old Trafford, meaning that they will need to win their final game of the season when they return to Manchester to face City at Maine Road.

11 May 1983: Manchester United miss the chance to clinch runners-up spot in the First Division when they lose 2–0 at Tottenham.

14 May 1983: The First Division season ends with Watford beating Liverpool 2–1 to finish runners-up in their first season as a First Division team. Manchester United finish third after losing 3–2 away to Notts County. Tottenham Hotspur book another European campaign, this time in the UEFA Cup, with a 4–1 home win over Stoke City ensuring a fourth-place finish for Keith Burkinshaw's team. Nottingham Forest seal a return to European competitions after missing out last season by beating doomed Swansea 3–0 at the Vetch Field to fifth. The final UEFA Cup place goes to Aston Villa, who beat Arsenal 2–1 at Villa Park to finish sixth. Luton Town pull off a remarkable escape from relegation when a late goal from Yugoslav defender Radomir Antic gives them a 1–0 away win over Manchester City and sends the hosts down after 17 years in the First Division. Leicester City seal the final promotion place in the Second Division, drawing 0–0 at home to Burnley while Fulham lose 1–0 at Derby and Newcastle draw 2–2 at Wolves. Bolton Wanderers are relegated from the Second Division after going down 4–1 at Charlton Athletic in their final game of the season, as are Rotherham United after being held to a 2–2 draw by Leeds United at Elland Road. The final remaining game of the Second Division is a relegation decider between Burnley and Crystal Palace which has yet to be played. Reading and Wrexham join Doncaster Rovers in relegation from the Third Division. Scunthorpe United pip Bury to the final promotion place in the Fourth Division with a 2–1 win over Chester at Sealand Road, with the Gigg Lane side missing out on promotion after losing 3–1 at home to champions Wimbledon.

17 May 1983: The Football League season draws to a close with the Second Division relegation decider at Selhurst Park and a dead-rubber match at Feethams. In the Selhurst Park clash, Crystal Palace beat Burnley 1–0 to send their Lancastrian opponents down to the Third Division at the end of a season where two good cup runs took their strain on a side which couldn't repeat the same form in the league. The Fourth Division clash between Darlington and Peterborough United is a seven-goal thriller with the home side winning 4–3.

20 May 1983: Everton sell 21-year-old winger Steve McMahon, 21, to Aston Villa for £175,000.

21 May 1983: Manchester United and Brighton & Hove Albion draw 2–2 in the FA Cup final to book a replay in five days time. Brighton nearly win the game with a late shot by Gordon Smith, which United goalkeeper Gary Bailey saves.

26 May 1983: Manchester United thrash Brighton & Hove Albion 4–0 in the FA Cup final replay to lift the trophy on legendary former manager and current director Sir Matt Busby's 74th birthday. Bryan Robson scores twice, with Norman Whiteside becoming the youngest scorer in an FA Cup final shortly after his 18th birthday, while an Arnold Muhren penalty makes the Dutchman one of the first foreign players to score in an English cup final.

31 May 1983: Coventry City sack manager Dave Sexton after two seasons in charge. His successor is the Bristol Rovers manager and former Sky Blues player Bobby Gould.

1 June 1983: England clinch the Home Championship by beating Scotland 2–0 at Wembley. 19-year-old Swindon Town striker Paul Rideout moves from the Fourth Division to the First in a £200,000 transfer to Aston Villa.

30 June 1983: Billy McNeill steps down as manager of Scottish league champions Celtic to take over as manager of Manchester City.

== UEFA competitions ==
Aston Villa won the European Super Cup with midfield dynamo Gordon Cowans playing a major part in the win.

== FA Cup ==
Manchester United won their first major trophy under Ron Atkinson's management by beating Brighton 4–0 in the FA Cup final replay after a 2–2 draw in the first match.

== League Cup ==
Liverpool won their third successive League Cup as an added bonus for manager Bob Paisley during his final season in charge. When his team prepared to ascend the 39 steps to the Royal Box, they all insisted that he should be the man to collect the trophy.

== Football League ==
=== First Division ===
Bob Paisley went out on a high when retiring as Liverpool manager after nine years and numerous trophies by winning the league title and the Football League Cup. His formidable team had looked uncatchable in the league by the turn of 1983, and finished top of the table by 11 points. Their nearest rivals were Watford, in the First Division for the first time and spearheaded by the ownership of Elton John, management of Graham Taylor and the attacking prowess of Luther Blissett and John Barnes. Third placed Manchester United had been on the losing side to Liverpool in the League Cup final and were very nearly beaten by a last minute Brighton goal in the FA Cup final, only for a Gary Bailey save to force a replay which United won 4-0. The top five was completed by Nottingham Forest and Tottenham Hotspur.

FA Cup finalists Brighton & Hove Albion were relegated after four seasons in the top flight. Next to go down were Swansea City, whose second season among the elite was a complete contrast to their first, where they had finished sixth. The final relegation place was decided in dramatic fashion at Maine Road, where Luton Town had to beat their hosts Manchester City to stay up and send the home side (who had never been in the relegation zone at any point of the season until then, and had been safely in mid-table until the controversial sacking of manager John Bond in February, leading to a disastrous run of results under replacement manager John Benson) down. A late winner by Luton's Raddy Antic gave Luton survival, which manager David Pleat famously celebrated by galloping on the pitch, arms aloft, when the final whistle was blown.

Pos	Team	Pld	W	D	L	GF	GA	GD	Pts	Qualification or relegation
1	Liverpool (C)	42	24	10	8	87	37	+50	82	Qualification for the European Cup first round
2	Watford	42	22	5	15	74	57	+17	71	Qualification for the UEFA Cup first round
3	Manchester United	42	19	13	10	56	38	+18	70	Qualification for the Cup Winners' Cup first round (Note: Manchester United qualified for the European Cup Winners' Cup first round as the 1982–83 FA Cup winners.)
4	Tottenham Hotspur	42	20	9	13	65	50	+15	69	Qualification for the UEFA Cup first round
5	Nottingham Forest	42	20	9	13	62	50	+12	69	Qualification for the UEFA Cup first round
6	Aston Villa	42	21	5	16	62	50	+12	68	Qualification for the UEFA Cup first round
7	Everton	42	18	10	14	66	48	+18	64	
8	West Ham United	42	20	4	18	68	62	+6	64	
9	Ipswich Town	42	15	13	14	64	50	+14	58	
10	Arsenal	42	16	10	16	58	56	+2	58	
11	West Bromwich Albion	42	15	12	15	51	49	+2	57	
12	Southampton	42	15	12	15	54	58	−4	57	
13	Stoke City	42	16	9	17	53	64	−11	57	
14	Norwich City	42	14	12	16	52	58	−6	54	
15	Notts County	42	15	7	20	55	71	−16	52	
16	Sunderland	42	12	14	16	48	61	−13	50	
17	Birmingham City	42	12	14	16	40	55	−15	50	
18	Luton Town	42	12	13	17	65	84	−19	49	
19	Coventry City	42	13	9	20	48	59	−11	48	
20	Manchester City (R)	42	13	8	21	47	70	−23	47	Relegation to the Second Division
21	Swansea City (R)	42	10	11	21	51	69	−18	41	Cup Winners' Cup preliminary round and relegation to the Second Division (Note: Swansea City qualified for the European Cup Winners' Cup preliminary round as the 1983 Welsh Cup winners.)
22	Brighton & Hove Albion (R)	42	9	13	20	38	68	−30	40	Relegation to the Second Division

Source: World Football
Rules for classification: 1) Points; 2) Goal difference; 3) Goals scored
(C) Champions; (R) Relegated

=== Second Division ===
A year after being runners-up in the FA Cup, Queens Park Rangers won the Second Division title and secured a return to the First Division after four years away. Runners-up spot went to Wolverhampton Wanderers, who had been saved from closure by former player Derek Dougan just before the start of the season, while Leicester City clinched the final promotion place, a point ahead of a Fulham side who came close to a second successive promotion under the management of former England striker Malcolm Macdonald. Another former England striker, Kevin Keegan, who was still playing, had an impressive first season at Newcastle United but could not quite inspire them to promotion, nor could World Cup winner Jack Charlton as manager of FA Cup semi-finalists Sheffield Wednesday.

Bolton Wanderers, Rotherham United and League Cup semi-finalists Burnley ended the season relegated, while Chelsea narrowly avoided the drop, as did Derby County after the return of former coach Peter Taylor to the club as manager.

Pos	Team	Pld	W	D	L	GF	GA	GD	Pts	Relegation
1	Queens Park Rangers (C, P)	42	26	7	9	77	36	+41	85	Promotion to the First Division
2	Wolverhampton Wanderers (P)	42	20	15	7	68	44	+24	75	Promotion to the First Division
3	Leicester City (P)	42	20	10	12	72	44	+28	70	Promotion to the First Division
4	Fulham	42	20	9	13	64	47	+17	69	
5	Newcastle United	42	18	13	11	75	53	+22	67	
6	Sheffield Wednesday	42	16	15	11	60	47	+13	63	
7	Oldham Athletic	42	14	19	9	64	47	+17	61	
8	Leeds United	42	13	21	8	51	46	+5	60	
9	Shrewsbury Town	42	15	14	13	48	48	0	59	
10	Barnsley	42	14	15	13	57	55	+2	57	
11	Blackburn Rovers	42	15	12	15	58	58	0	57	
12	Cambridge United	42	13	12	17	42	60	−18	51	
13	Derby County	42	10	19	13	49	58	−9	49	
14	Carlisle United	42	12	12	18	68	70	−2	48	
15	Crystal Palace	42	12	12	18	43	52	−9	48	
16	Middlesbrough	42	11	15	16	46	67	−21	48	
17	Charlton Athletic	42	13	9	20	63	86	−23	48	
18	Chelsea	42	11	14	17	51	61	−10	47	
19	Grimsby Town	42	12	11	19	45	70	−25	47	
20	Rotherham United (R)	42	10	15	17	45	68	−23	45	Relegation to the Third Division
21	Burnley (R)	42	12	8	22	56	66	−10	44	Relegation to the Third Division
22	Bolton Wanderers (R)	42	11	11	20	42	61	−19	44	Relegation to the Third Division

Rules for classification: 1) Points; 2) Goal difference; 3) Goals scored
(C) Champions; (P) Promoted; (R) Relegated

=== Third Division ===
Portsmouth's revival continued as they clinched the Third Division title to secure a second promotion in four seasons. Cardiff City won promotion back to the Second Division after suffering relegation the previous season, as well as Huddersfield Town, who like Portsmouth continued their revival by also securing a second promotion in four seasons. Newport County's collapse in the final weeks of the season cost them a place in the Second Division, a similar fate befalling Oxford United in the first full season of Robert Maxwell's ownership and Jim Smith's management. For the second season running, Lincoln City just missed out on promotion.

Chesterfield, Doncaster Rovers, Wrexham and Reading ended the season relegated.

Pos	Team	Pld	W	D	L	GF	GA	GD	Pts	Promotion or relegation
1	Portsmouth (C, P)	46	27	10	9	74	41	+33	91	Promotion to the Second Division
2	Cardiff City (P)	46	25	11	10	76	50	+26	86	Promotion to the Second Division
3	Huddersfield Town (P)	46	23	13	10	84	49	+35	82	Promotion to the Second Division
4	Newport County	46	23	9	14	76	54	+22	78	
5	Oxford United	46	22	12	12	71	53	+18	78	
6	Lincoln City	46	23	7	16	77	51	+26	76	
7	Bristol Rovers	46	22	9	15	84	58	+26	75	
8	Plymouth Argyle	46	19	8	19	61	66	−5	65	
9	Brentford	46	18	10	18	88	77	+11	64	
10	Walsall	46	17	13	16	64	63	+1	64	
11	Sheffield United	46	19	7	20	62	64	−2	64	
12	Bradford City	46	16	13	17	68	69	−1	61	
13	Gillingham	46	16	13	17	58	59	−1	61	
14	Bournemouth	46	16	13	17	59	68	−9	61	
15	Southend United	46	15	14	17	66	65	+1	59	
16	Preston North End	46	15	13	18	60	69	−9	58	
17	Millwall	46	14	13	19	64	77	−13	55	
18	Wigan Athletic	46	15	9	22	60	72	−12	54	
19	Exeter City	46	14	12	20	81	104	−23	54	
20	Orient	46	15	9	22	64	88	−24	54	
21	Reading (R)	46	12	17	17	64	79	−15	53	Relegation to the Fourth Division
22	Wrexham (R)	46	12	15	19	56	76	−20	51	Relegation to the Fourth Division
23	Doncaster Rovers (R)	46	9	11	26	57	97	−40	38	Relegation to the Fourth Division
24	Chesterfield (R)	46	8	13	25	43	68	−25	37	Relegation to the Fourth Division

(C) Champions; (P) Promoted; (R) Relegated

=== Fourth Division ===
Wimbledon set the Football League points record in the second season of three points for a win, gaining 98 points to win the Fourth Division title and their third promotion at this level since joining the Football League in 1977. They were joined by Hull City, Port Vale and Scunthorpe United.

Hereford United, Crewe Alexandra and Hartlepool United had to apply for re-election alongside fallen giants Blackpool, of Stanley Matthews fame and 1953 FA Cup glory. However, all four clubs were successful in gaining re-election.

Crewe Alexandra built for the future by appointing Dario Gradi as manager, hoping that he could keep them clear of the Fourth Division's lower reaches and achieve some of the success with them that he had achieved in two promotion winning campaigns at Wimbledon (although he did not complete the second promotion campaign at Wimbledon).

Pos	Team	Pld	W	D	L	GF	GA	GD	Pts	Promotion
1	Wimbledon (C, P)	46	29	11	6	96	45	+51	98	Promotion to the Third Division
2	Hull City (P)	46	25	15	6	75	34	+41	90	Promotion to the Third Division
3	Port Vale (P)	46	26	10	10	67	34	+33	88	Promotion to the Third Division
4	Scunthorpe United (P)	46	23	14	9	71	42	+29	83	Promotion to the Third Division
5	Bury	46	23	12	11	74	46	+28	81	
6	Colchester United	46	24	9	13	75	55	+20	81	
7	York City	46	22	13	11	88	58	+30	79	
8	Swindon Town	46	19	11	16	61	54	+7	68	
9	Peterborough United	46	17	13	16	58	52	+6	64	
10	Mansfield Town	46	16	13	17	61	70	−9	61	
11	Halifax Town	46	16	12	18	59	66	−7	60	
12	Torquay United	46	17	7	22	56	65	−9	58	
13	Chester City	46	15	11	20	55	60	−5	56	
14	Bristol City	46	13	17	16	59	70	−11	56	
15	Northampton Town	46	14	12	20	65	75	−10	54	
16	Stockport County	46	14	12	20	60	79	−19	54	
17	Darlington	46	13	13	20	61	71	−10	52	
18	Aldershot	46	12	15	19	61	82	−21	51	
19	Tranmere Rovers	46	13	11	22	49	71	−22	50	
20	Rochdale	46	11	16	19	55	73	−18	49	
21	Blackpool	46	13	12	21	55	74	−19	49 (Note: Blackpool had two points deducted.)	Re-elected
22	Hartlepool United	46	13	9	24	46	76	−30	48	Re-elected
23	Crewe Alexandra	46	11	8	27	53	71	−18	41	Re-elected
24	Hereford United	46	11	8	27	42	79	−37	41	Re-elected

(C) Champions; (P) Promoted

=== Top goalscorers ===
First Division

- Luther Blissett (Watford) – 27 goals

Second Division

- Gary Lineker (Leicester City) – 26 goals

Third Division

- Kerry Dixon (Reading) – 26 goals

Fourth Division

- Steve Cammack (Scunthorpe United) – 25 goals

== Non-league football ==
The divisional champions of the major non-League competitions were:

Competition	Winners
Alliance Premier League	Enfield
Isthmian League	Wycombe Wanderers
Northern Premier League	Gateshead
Southern League	AP Leamington
FA Trophy	Telford United
FA Vase	VS Rugby

== Star players ==
- Liverpool's dominant side ran away with the honours as Kenny Dalglish was voted both PFA Players' Player of the Year and FWA Footballer of the Year.
- 21-year-old Liverpool striker Ian Rush established himself as one of the league's finest goalscorers after collecting the PFA Young Player of the Year award as well as league championship and League Cup medals.
- Manchester United's FA Cup winning squad included star players like Bryan Robson, Ray Wilkins and the 18-year-old Norman Whiteside.
- Aston Villa's midfield dynamo Gordon Cowans helps inspire Villa to win the European Super Cup.
- The key player in Watford's rise to the top of the English game was prolific striker Luther Blissett.

== Successful managers ==
- Bob Paisley's illustrious career as Liverpool manager went out on a high as they were league champions and League Cup winners.
- Graham Taylor guided Watford to an impressive second-place finish in their First Division debut season.
- Ron Atkinson won the FA Cup to end Manchester United's six-year trophy drought.
- Terry Venables took Queens Park Rangers back into the First Division after a four-year exile.
- Jimmy Melia guided Brighton to their first-ever FA Cup final although he couldn't save them from relegation to the Second Division.
- Graham Hawkins took Wolverhampton Wanderers back into the First Division a year after relegation.
- Dave Bassett guided Wimbledon to Fourth Division championship glory with 98 points.
- Malcolm Macdonald took Fulham to fourth place in the Second Division – just missing out on promotion – to achieve their highest league finish for nearly 20 years.
- Keith Burkinshaw inspired Tottenham to fourth place in the First Division and ensured that they would qualify for the following season's UEFA Cup.
- Brian Clough ensured that Nottingham Forest remained among English football's leading sides by inspiring them to fifth place in the league and achieving qualification for the UEFA Cup.

== Famous debutants ==
1 January 1983: Tony Cottee, 17-year-old striker, scores on his debut for West Ham United in 3–0 win over Tottenham Hotspur at Upton Park.

26 February 1983: Ian Baird, 18-year-old striker, makes his debut for Southampton in 1–1 draw with West Ham United at Upton Park.

20 April 1983: Colin Hill, 19-year-old defender, makes his debut for Arsenal in 3–1 defeat by Norwich City at Carrow Road.

== Deaths ==
- 6 September 1982 -
  - - Ken Barton, 44, played four league games for Tottenham Hotspur and 11 for Luton Town at full-back in the 1960s before dropping into non-league football.
  - - Robert Done, 78, played 147 league games at full-back for Liverpool between 1926 and 1935, later playing for Reading, Chester, Accrington Stanley and Bangor City.
- 13 October 1982 - Denis William Cashmore, 75, played for Watford until his career was ended by an injury in 1932 which resulted in the loss of all of his hearing.
- 25 October 1982 - Bill Eckersley, 57, played 406 league games for Blackburn Rovers at left-back between 1947 and 1961 and was capped 17 times for England.
- 8 November 1982 – Jimmy Dickinson, 57, former Portsmouth wing-half and captain, and England international, who played more than 800 matches for Pompey, winning two league championship medals.
- 11 November 1982 – John Lyons, 26, Colchester United striker, died of suicide.
- 19 November 1982 - Herbie Evans, 88, was a wing-half for Cardiff City in the 1920s before a broken leg ended his career in 1926.
- 12 January 1983 - Cecil Poynton, 81, played 152 league games at left-back for Tottenham Hotspur in the interwar years.
- 1 March 1983 - Charlie Dixon, 79, played 60 league games during the interwar years for Bournemouth & Boscombe Athletic, Nelson and Southport.
- 21 March 1983 - Roy Chapman, 49, scored 200 league goals between 1952 and 1969 for Aston Villa, Lincoln City, Mansfield Town, Port Vale and Chester. He player-managed Lincoln City in the mid-1960s and later took charge of Stockport County between two spells in charge of non-league Stafford Rangers. He was the father of fellow footballer Lee Chapman. Died of a heart attack while participating in a five-a-side tournament.
- 29 March 1983 - Tommy Graham, 78, played at centre-half for Nottingham Forest and won two England caps in 1931.
- 3 April 1983 – Jimmy Bloomfield, 49, former inside-forward, most notably at Arsenal and Birmingham City; later manager at Leyton Orient and Leicester City. Died from cancer.
- 13 April 1983 – Gerry Hitchens, 48, former England international striker who scored five goals in seven internationals, and played at club level for Cardiff City, Aston Villa and several teams in the Italian Serie A, including Inter and Torino.
- 17 April 1983 - George Holdcroft, 74, played 359 league games in the interwar years for Port Vale, Darlington and Preston North End, keeping goal for England twice in 1936. He collected an FA Cup winner's medal for Preston in 1938.
