= Robert Weaver =

Robert Weaver may refer to:

- Robert Weaver (editor) (1921–2008), Canadian editor and broadcaster
- Robert C. Weaver (1907–1997), American economist and political appointee
- Robert Weaver (illustrator) (1924–1994), American illustrator
- Robert Weaver (surfer) (born 1965), American surfer
- Robert Weaver (MP) (1630–1687), British Member of Parliament
- Robert Weaver (antiquary) (1773–1852), English antiquary
- Robert Edward Weaver (1913–1991), American regionalist artist and illustrator
- Robert M. Weaver (born 1979), healthcare consultant
- Bobby Weaver (born 1958), wrestler
- Bob Weaver (weatherman) (1928–2006), American TV weatherman
- Bob Weaver (footballer) (1912–?), English footballer
