= Archie Williams (disambiguation) =

Archie Williams (1915–1993) was an athlete.

Archie Williams may also refer to:

- Archie Williams (footballer) (1927–1985), Scottish football player, who played for Hearts, Motherwell and Dunfermline
- Archie Williams (footballer born 1898) from List of Wigan Borough F.C. players
- Archie Williams (singer) (born 1961), contestant in 2020 in America's Got Talent season 15

== See also ==
- Archibald Williams (disambiguation)
