= Tebb =

Tebb is an English surname. Notable people with the surname include:

- Barry Tebb (born 1942), English poet, publisher, and author
- Tommy Tebb (1911–1957), English footballer
- William Tebb (1830–1917), British businessman and reformer
