= Bellis (surname) =

Bellis is a surname. Notable people with the surname include:

- Alf Bellis (1920–2013), English footballer
- Antonio de Bellis (c. 1616 – c. 1656), Italian painter
- Benjamin N. Bellis (1924–2019), United States Air Force officer
- Charlotte Bellis, New Zealand journalist
- CiCi Bellis (born 1999), American tennis player
- Gavin Bellis (born 1973), Australian rower
- George Bellis (1904–1969), English footballer
- Guy Bellis (1886–1980), English actor
- Jonathan Bellis (born 1988), Manx cyclist
- Joseph H. Bellis (1867–1920), American politician
- Richard Roe Bellis (1964), American film and television music composer
- Scott Bellis, Canadian actor and film director
