= Sandbach (surname) =

Origin
- Language: Old English
- Meaning: sandy brook
- Region of origin: Cheshire, England

Other names
- Variant forms: Sanbach, Sandbadge

Sandbach is an English language toponymic surname. It derives from Sandbach in Cheshire, England, which was named for a sandy brook.

== Notable people named Sandbach ==
- Antoinette Sandbach (born 1969), British politician
- Arthur Sandbach (1859–1928), British Army general officer
- Charles Sandbach (1909–1990), British footballer
- Chris Sandbach (born 1985), English cricketer
- Harry Sandbach (1903–1991), British classical scholar
- Margaret Sandbach (1812–1852), British poet and novelist
- Richard de Sandbach, High Sheriff of Cheshire (1230)
- Samuel Sandbach (1769–1851), British politician
