= Arthur Hawes =

Arthur Hawes may refer to:

- Arthur Hawes (footballer) (1895–1963), English footballer
- Arthur Hawes (priest) (born 1943), English priest of the Anglican church
- Arthur W. Hawes (fl. 1940s), architect of 10050 Cielo Drive, scene of the Tate–LaBianca murders

== See also ==
- Leonard Arthur Hawes (1892−1986), senior officer in the British Army
