= William Wade =

William, Billy or Bill Wade may refer to:

== Politicians ==
- William Wade (Maldon MP), in 1410, MP for Maldon
- William Wade (English politician) (1546–1623), English statesman and diplomat
- William H. Wade (1835–1911), American politician, U.S. Representative from Missouri
- Sir William Wade (lord mayor) (1849–1935), British politician, Lord Mayor of Bradford
- Arthur Wade (William Arthur Wade, 1919–2014), Australian politician, member of the New South Wales Legislative Assembly
- William Wade, Baron Wade of Chorlton (1932–2018), British politician, businessman and agriculturalist
- Will Wade (Georgia politician), American politician from Georgia

== Sports ==
- Bill Wade (footballer) (1901–1958), English footballer
- Billy Wade (cricketer) (1914–2003), South African cricketer
- Bill Wade (1930–2016), American football quarterback
- Billy Wade (racing driver) (1930–1965), American race car driver
- Will Wade (born 1982), American college basketball coach

== Others ==
- William Wade (Canon of Windsor) (1672–1733), Irish Anglican priest
- William Wade (Dean of Glasgow and Galloway) (died 1845), Scottish Episcopalian priest
- Sir William Wade (legal scholar) (1918–2004), British academic lawyer
- William Wade (journalist) (1918–2006), American war correspondent during World War II
