= Thomas Conway (disambiguation) =

Thomas Conway (1735–1800) was an Irish-born soldier who served in the French Army and in the American Continental Army.

Thomas or Tom Conway may also refer to:

- Thomas W. Conway (1840–1887), Freedmen Bureau official in Alabama and Louisiana during the Reconstruction Era
- Thomas F. Conway (1862–1945), American lawyer and politician; Lieutenant Governor of New York, 1911–1912
- Thomas G. Conway, Canadian lawyer, former Treasurer of the Law Society of Upper Canada
- Thomas H. Conway (1860–1940), American politician; Wisconsin State Assemblyman
- Tom Conway (1904–1967), British actor
- Tom Conway (footballer, born 1933) (1933–2019), English football player for Port Vale
- Tom Conway (footballer, born 1959), Irish soccer player
- Thomas Conway (footballer), footballer from Northern Ireland
- Tommy Conway (born 2002), British footballer
- Tim Conway (1933–2019), American comedian and actor born Thomas Conway
- Thomas Conway (MP) (1597 – c. 1631), MP for Rye in 1624
