= Joseph Hodgkinson =

Joseph Hodgkinson may refer to

- Joe Hodgkinson (footballer, born 1882) (1882–1926), English footballer, see List of Bury F.C. players (1–24 appearances)
- Joe Hodgkinson (footballer, born 1905) (1905–1975), English footballer, see List of Wigan Borough F.C. players
