= Tommy Tebb =

English footballer

Personal information
- Full name: Thomas Edward Tebb
- Date of birth: 1911
- Place of birth: Westerhope, England
- Date of death: 23 June 1957 (aged 46)
- Place of death: Westerhope, England
- Position: Inside forward

Youth career
- Scotswood

Senior career*
Years	Team	Apps	(Gls)
1929–1930	Washington Colliery	?	(?)
1930–1931	Nelson	14	(2)
1931–1932	Wigan Borough	6	(0)
1932–1933	Lancaster Town	?	(?)
1933–1934	Tottenham Hotspur	0	(0)
1933	→ Northfleet United (loan)	?	(?)
1934–19xx	Blyth Spartans	?	(?)
- * Club domestic league appearances and goals

Thomas Edward Tebb (1911 – 23 June 1957) was an English professional footballer who played as an inside forward. Born in Westerhope, he began his career in amateur football before joining Third Division North side Nelson in 1930. He made 14 senior appearances for the club and scored Nelson's last goal in the Football League. Tebb went on to assist Wigan Borough and Lancaster Town and had an unsuccessful spell with Tottenham Hotspur.

== Biography ==
Tebb was born in Westerhope, a mining village near Newcastle upon Tyne, in the first quarter of 1911. Aside from football, he was also a keen sprint runner. After retiring from professional football, he returned to live in Westerhope and died there on 23 June 1957, at the age of 46.

== Football career ==
At the age of 16, Tebb started to play for Scotswood in the North Eastern League. In 1928 he was selected to represent "The Rest of the North Eastern League" in an exhibition match against the league champions, Sunderland Reserves. While at Scotswood, he had trial spells with Aston Villa and Hull City, but was not offered a contract by either club. In August 1929, Tebb transferred to North Eastern League First Division side Washington Colliery as was part of the team that finished 18th in the division in the 1929–30 season. His performances for Washington led to him being signed by Football League Third Division North club Nelson in June 1930.

Tebb was one of several new signings acquired by Nelson in the summer of 1930, along with fellow forwards Arthur Bate and Leslie Raisbeck, as the club aimed to improve on a 19th-placed finish from the previous campaign. He made his debut for Nelson in the opening fixture of the 1930–31 season, playing at inside-left in the 4–5 defeat away at Rochdale. Tebb was dropped for the next three matches in favour of Arthur Hawes but returned on 13 September 1930, appearing at inside-right in place of Frank Allen as Nelson lost 0–1 at Halifax Town. He retained his place in the team for the following five games, but was then dropped again as manager Jack English made several changes for the trip to Crewe Alexandra on 18 October 1930.

Over the next five months Tebb made just one senior appearance, deputising for Hawes in the goalless draw with Rochdale at Seedhill on 27 December 1930. However, with Nelson bottom of the division and seven matches of the season remaining he was recalled to the starting line-up. He made his return for the visit of Wigan Borough on 3 April 1931 and scored the first goal in a 2–1 win. The victory proved to be Nelson's last of the season as the team lost its remaining six matches to finish 11 points adrift at the foot of the table. Tebb played in five of those defeats, and in his last appearance for Nelson in the penultimate game of the campaign he netted a consolation goal in the 1–5 loss away at Wrexham. The goal turned out to be Nelson's last in the Football League as their re-election application was unsuccessful and their place in the Third Division North was usurped by Chester.

Along with many of the Nelson team, Tebb left Seedhill, preferring to stay in League football. He subsequently linked up with Wigan Borough in July 1931 and played six league matches for them before the club was wound-up midway through the season after suffering financial problems. Again without a club, Tebb joined Lancashire Combination outfit Lancaster Town in the summer of 1932. He spent one season at Lancaster, during which he was linked with a return to the Football League with Preston North End. Although the transfer never materialised, his return to professional football was confirmed when he signed with First Division side Tottenham Hotspur in June 1933. However, Tebb failed to break into the first team at White Hart Lane and was loaned out to Northfleet United two months later. After being released by Tottenham at the end of the 1933–34 season, Tebb returned to the North Eastern League with Blyth Spartans, where he ended his career.
