= Ernie Robinson (footballer) =

English footballer

Personal information
- Full name: Ernest George Robinson
- Date of birth: 21 January 1908
- Place of birth: Shiney Row, England
- Date of death: 22 May 1991 (aged 83)
- Place of death: Vancouver, British Columbia, Canada
- Height: 5 ft 10 in (1.78 m)
- Position: Right back

Youth career
- Shiney Row Swifts
- Houghton Colliery Welfare

Senior career*
Years	Team	Apps	(Gls)
1926–1927	Shildon	?	(?)
1927–1929	York City	9	(0)
1929–1930	Notts County	0	(0)
1930–1931	Nelson	27	(0)
1931–1932	Tunbridge Wells Rangers	?	(?)
1932–1933	Barnsley	23	(0)
1933–1934	Sheffield United	17	(0)
1934–1935	Carlisle United	38	(0)
1935–1939	Lincoln City	64	(0)
- * Club domestic league appearances and goals

Ernest George Robinson (21 January 1908 – 22 May 1991) was an English professional footballer who played as a right back. As a youth, he worked as a coal miner while playing local-league football. He played for several non-League clubs before joining Notts County in 1929. Over the following ten years, Robinson played for five different Football League sides and made a total of 169 appearances. He later worked as a coach in the Netherlands before emigrating to Canada in later life.

== Biography ==
Robinson was born on 21 January 1908 in the mining village of Shiney Row, County Durham and worked as a collier before becoming a professional footballer. In 1985, after retiring from work, he emigrated to Canada. Robinson died in Vancouver in 1991.

== Football career ==
While working as a miner, Robinson played for his village club Shiney Row Swifts, and later assisted Houghton Colliery Welfare. In June 1926, he signed as an amateur with North Eastern League club Shildon, where he spent one season. The following summer he joined Midland Football League side York City, initially on amateur terms. Robinson was awarded a professional contract in August 1928 and made a total of nine league appearances during his two years at Fulfordgate. In May 1929, he was signed by Notts County of the Football League Second Division, but he failed to play in a first-team fixture for the club.

Robinson left Notts County at the end of the 1929–30 season and joined Third Division North club Nelson in June 1930. He was signed to replace Ted Ferguson, who had departed to Annfield Plain during the summer. Robinson made his Nelson debut in the opening match of the 1930–31 campaign, a 4–5 defeat away at Rochdale, and kept his place in the side for 28 consecutive matches. However, the club struggled during that time, recording only five wins and suffering heavy defeats to Tranmere Rovers (1–7) and Southport (1–8). He was dropped for the trip to New Brighton on 24 January 1931 in favour of Gilbert Richmond, who retained his starting place for the next three games. Robinson returned for two matches during February 1931 but again lost his place to Richmond, who shared right-back duties with Harry Counsell over the remainder of the season. The following month, Robinson left Nelson in order to join Northampton Town on trial.

After an unsuccessful trial spell at Northampton, Robinson returned to non-League football with Southern League outfit Tunbridge Wells Rangers. In July 1932 he signed for Barnsley, where he made 23 league appearances during the 1932–33 season. Robinson moved to First Division club Sheffield United for a transfer fee of £750 in the summer of 1933. After playing 17 league matches for the Bramall Lane side, he found himself surplus to requirements and was sold to Carlisle United in August 1934 for £175, less than a quarter of the fee paid the previous year. Robinson was an ever-present for Carlisle throughout the 1934–35 campaign, appearing in all 38 league fixtures. Despite this, he moved clubs again in August 1935 and signed for Lincoln City on a free transfer. Robinson spent more than four years at Sincil Bank, making 64 league appearances, before his career was brought to an end by the outbreak of the Second World War. After the war, he worked as a football coach in the Netherlands with Enschede.
