= Bellis (disambiguation) =

Bellis is a genus of flowering plants in the family Asteraceae.

Bellis may also refer to:

- Bellis (surname)
- Bellis, Alberta, hamlet in Alberta, Canada
- Belgian minehunter Bellis (M916), Tripartite-class minehunter of the Belgian Naval Component

== See also ==
- Belli
