= Arthur Smith (Welsh footballer) =

Welsh footballer

Personal information
- Full name: Arthur Harold Smith
- Place of birth: Marchwiel, Wales
- Position: Goalkeeper

Senior career*
Years	Team	Apps	(Gls)
1927–1928	Wrexham	3	(0)
1930	Macclesfield	14	(0)
- * Club domestic league appearances and goals

Arthur Harold Smith was a Welsh footballer who played as a goalkeeper in the Football League for Wrexham.

== Personal life ==
Smith's brother Cecil was also a footballer.

== Career statistics ==
Appearances and goals by club, season and competition
Club	Season	League			FA Cup		Other		Total	
Club	Season	Division	Apps	Goals	Apps	Goals	Apps	Goals	Apps	Goals
Wrexham	1927–28	Third Division North	3	0	2	0	―		5	0
Macclesfield	1930–31	Cheshire County League	14	0	2	0	1 (Note: Appearance in Cheshire Senior Medal Competition)	0	17	0
Career total			17	0	4	0	1	0	19	0
