= Archibald Williams =

Archibald Williams may refer to:

- A. H. A. Williams (Archibald Hunter Arrington Williams, 1842–1895), Democratic U.S. congressman from North Carolina
- Archibald Williams (judge) (1801–1863), United States federal judge

== See also ==
- Archie Williams (disambiguation)
