= Albert Potter =

English footballer (1897–1942)

Personal information
- Full name: Albert Edward Potter
- Date of birth: 23 September 1897
- Place of birth: Exeter, England
- Date of death: 4 May 1942 (aged 44)
- Place of death: Exeter, England
- Height: 5 ft 10 in (1.78 m)
- Positions: Left half; left back

Senior career*
Years	Team	Apps	(Gls)
- Woodbury
–1922	Pinhoe		
1922–1927	Exeter City	89	(3)
1927–1929	Wigan Borough	67	(4)
1929–1930	Colwyn Bay United		
- Devon General Bus Company
- * Club domestic league appearances and goals

Private Albert Edward Potter (23 September 1897 – 4 May 1942) was an English professional footballer who played in the Football League for Exeter City and Wigan Borough as a left half.

== Personal life ==
Potter served as a private in the Devonshire Regiment during the First World War and saw action on the Western Front (where he was wounded) and in the Siege of Kut in Mesopotamia. He served as an Air Raid Warden during the Second World War and was killed during the Exeter Blitz in May 1942. Potter was buried in All Saints Cemetery, Whipton, Exeter.
