= Thomas Kelly (footballer, born 1902) =

English footballer

Personal information
- Full name: Thomas Kelly
- Date of birth: 13 January 1902
- Place of birth: Manchester, England
- Date of death: 1949 (aged 53–54)
- Position: Centre forward

Senior career*
Years	Team	Apps	(Gls)
1919–1920	Corpus Christi		
1920–1921	Ancoats Lads Club		
1921–1922	Bradford Road Gasworks		
1922–1923	Hadfield		
1923	Stalybridge Celtic		
1923–1925	Barnsley	15	(5)
1925–1930	Rhyl Athletic		
1930–1931	Wigan Borough	1	(0)
Total		16	(5)
- * Club domestic league appearances and goals

Thomas Kelly (13 January 1902 – 1949) was an English footballer who played in the Football League for Barnsley and Wigan Borough.
