= Charlie Hillam =

English footballer

Personal information
- Full name: Charles Emmanuel Hillam
- Date of birth: 6 October 1908
- Place of birth: Burnley, England
- Date of death: 16 June 1958 (aged 49)
- Place of death: Southend-on-Sea, England
- Height: 5 ft 11 1/2 in (1.82 m)
- Position: Goalkeeper

Senior career*
Years	Team	Apps	(Gls)
–1930	Clitheroe		
1930–	Nelson	3	(0)
–1932	Clitheroe		
1932–1933	Burnley	19	(0)
1933–1934	Manchester United	8	(0)
1934–1938	Clapton Orient	125	(0)
1938–1941	Southend United	13	(0)
1946	Ekco Sports		
1948	Chingford Town		
- * Club domestic league appearances and goals

Charles Emmanuel Hillam (6 October 1908 – 16 June 1958) was an English professional footballer who played as a goalkeeper in the Football League for Nelson, Burnley, Clapton Orient, Manchester United and Southend United.

== Personal life ==
During the early years of his football career, Hillam worked as a miner. After retiring from professional football, he worked as a policeman.

== Career statistics ==
Appearances and goals by club, season and competition
Club	Season	League			FA Cup		Total	
Club	Season	Division	Apps	Goals	Apps	Goals	Apps	Goals
Nelson	1930–31	Third Division North	3	0	0	0	3	0
Manchester United	1933–34	Second Division	8	0	0	0	8	0
Southend United	1938–39	Third Division South	13	0	1	0	14	0
Career total			24	0	1	0	25	0
