= William Wood (footballer, born April 1910) =

English footballer

Personal information
- Full name: William Horace Wood
- Date of birth: 5 April 1910
- Place of birth: Mereclough, England
- Position: Full back

Senior career*
Years	Team	Apps	(Gls)
1930–1934	Burnley	32	(0)
1934–19xx	Yeovil Town		
- * Club domestic league appearances and goals

William Horace Wood (5 April 1910 – ?) was an English professional footballer who played as a full back. He began his career with Football League Second Division side Burnley, and was promoted to the senior team at the start of the 1930–31 season. Wood made his competitive debut for the club on 3 January 1931 in the 3–2 win against Southampton at Turf Moor. He went on to make 32 league appearances for Burnley before leaving to join Yeovil Town in May 1934.

== Career statistics ==
Appearances and goals by club, season and competition
Club	Season	League			FA Cup		Total	
Club	Season	Division	Apps	Goals	Apps	Goals	Apps	Goals
Burnley	1930–31	Second Division	11	0	0	0	11	0
Burnley	1931–32	Second Division	13	0	0	0	13	0
Burnley	1932–33	Second Division	2	0	0	0	2	0
Burnley	1933–34	Second Division	6	0	0	0	6	0
Total			32	0	0	0	32	0
