= John Jewell (footballer) =

English footballer

Personal information
- Date of birth: 1909
- Place of birth: Brierfield, England
- Position: Outside forward

Senior career*
| Years | Team | Apps | (Gls) |
| ?–1930 | Colne Town | | |
| 1930 | Burnley | 0 | (0) |
| 1930–1931 | Nelson | 3 | (0) |
| 1932–? | Bacup Borough | | |
- * Club domestic league appearances and goals

John Jewell (born 1909, date of death unknown) was an English footballer who played as an outside forward. He played for several clubs in East Lancashire during his career, and made three appearances in the Football League while playing for Nelson.

== Career ==
Born in Brierfield, Lancashire, Jewell played for nearby Colne Town as a youngster. He joined Burnley as an amateur in 1930. After failing to break into the first team, he signed for Football League Third Division North side Nelson in December of the same year. After taking only one point from the previous five league matches, Jewell was drafted into the Nelson team as the selectors attempted to change the side's fortunes. He was the fifth outside-right to be used by Nelson in the 1930–31 season, and made his debut on 20 December 1930 in the 2–0 win against Wrexham at Seedhill. The local newspaper, the Nelson Leader, was impressed by Jewell's performance, claiming that he deserved an extended run in the team.

Jewell was selected for the following match away at Hartlepools United but after Nelson suffered a 0–4 defeat, he was dropped from the team along with David Suttie. After almost a month out of the side, Jewell was reinstated for the visit of Halifax Town on 17 January 1931, which finished in a 3–2 victory for Nelson. He did not make another appearance for the club, and left soon afterwards. Jewell joined Lancashire Combination outfit Bacup Borough in November 1932, but his whereabouts thenceforth are untraced.
