= Georgie Mee =

English footballer

Personal information
- Full name: George Wilfred Mee
- Date of birth: 12 April 1900
- Place of birth: Bulwell, Nottingham, England
- Date of death: July 1978 (aged 78)
- Place of death: Poulton-le-Fylde, England
- Height: 1.68 m (5 ft 6 in)
- Position: Midfielder

Youth career
- Highbury Vale Athletic

Senior career*
| Years | Team | Apps | (Gls) |
| –1920 | Notts County | 0 | (0) |
| 1920–1926 | Blackpool | 216 | (21) |
| 1926–1932 | Derby County | 148 | (15) |
| 1932–1933 | Burnley | 18 | (3) |
| 1933 | Mansfield Town | 11 | (0) |
| 1934–1935 | Great Harwood | | |
| 1935–1938 | Accrington Stanley | 106 | (8) |
| 1938 | Rochdale | 0 | (0) |
| 1938–1939 | Accrington Stanley | 17 | (2) |
- * Club domestic league appearances and goals

George Wilfred Mee (12 April 1900 – July 1978) was an English professional footballer. He played as a midfielder.

Nicknamed the Mighty Atom, he was the older brother of former Arsenal manager Bertie Mee.

== Career ==
Born in Bulwell, Nottinghamshire, Mee started his career at Notts County, before moving to Blackpool on a free transfer in July 1920.

Bill Norman gave Mee his Blackpool debut on 18 September 1920, replacing Joe Donachie at outside-left in a 2–0 league victory at Coventry. He went on to make a further 28 appearances during the 1920–21 campaign, scoring two goals, including the only goal in a victory over Nottingham Forest at Bloomfield Road on 22 January 1921.

Over the next four seasons (1921–22 to 1924–25), he was an ever-present, with over 200 consecutive matches (195 in the League), a feat which still stands as a club record.

In his second season, 1921–22, he scored seven goals, including the only goal in a victory at Coventry City on 28 January 1922, and both goals in a 2–1 win at home to Nottingham Forest on 4 March. One of them was described as "one of the greatest goals ever seen at Bloomfield Road".

Mee's final appearance for Blackpool occurred on 19 December 1925, in a single-goal victory over Sheffield Wednesday at Bloomfield Road. He was transferred to Derby County in February, along with Jimmy Gill, where he played until 1932 and made 148 appearances, scoring 15 goals. He went on to play for Burnley, Mansfield Town, Great Harwood, Accrington Stanley and Rochdale before returning to Accrington Stanley in 1938 where he ended his career.

== Blackpool F.C. Hall of Fame ==
Mee was inducted into the Hall of Fame at Bloomfield Road, when it was officially opened by former Blackpool player Jimmy Armfield in April 2006. Organised by the Blackpool Supporters Association, Blackpool fans around the world voted on their all-time heroes. Five players from each decade are inducted; Mee is in the pre-1950s.

== Post-retirement ==
After retiring, Mee bought a pub in Blackpool. He died in July 1978 in Poulton-le-Fylde.
