= Stan Bowsher =

Welsh footballer

Personal information
- Full name: Stanley James Bowsher
- Date of birth: 3 October 1899
- Place of birth: Newport, Wales
- Date of death: 1968 (aged 68–69)
- Position: Defender

Senior career*
Years	Team	Apps	(Gls)
19??–1925	Lovells Athletic		
1925–1929	Newport County	115	(3)
1929–1932	Burnley	82	(2)
1932–1933	Rochdale	10	(0)
1933–1934	Newport County	5	(0)

International career
1929	Wales	1	(0)
- * Club domestic league appearances and goals

Stanley James Bowsher (3 October 1899 – 1968) was a Welsh professional footballer who played as a central defender. He was awarded one cap for the Wales national football team.

Bowsher also played Welsh baseball and won one baseball cap for Wales in the annual match against England, 1931.
