= Tom Manns =

English footballer

Thomas Manns (born January 1911 – unknown) was an English footballer. His regular position was at full back. He was born in Rotherham. He played for Manchester United, Burnley and Clapton Orient.
