= Wilf Crompton =

English footballer

Personal information
- Full name: Wilfred Crompton
- Date of birth: 1 April 1908
- Place of birth: Blackburn, England
- Date of death: 1971 (aged 62–63)
- Height: 5 ft 8 in (1.73 m)
- Position: Outside forward

Senior career*
Years	Team	Apps	(Gls)
1929–1932	Blackburn Rovers	20	(5)
1932–1934	Burnley	31	(8)
1934–1935	Gillingham	14	(6)
1935–1937	Luton Town	48	(15)
- * Club domestic league appearances and goals

Wilfred Crompton (1 April 1908 – 1971) was an English professional footballer who played as an outside forward. He played in the Football League with Blackburn Rovers, Burnley, Gillingham and Luton Town.
