= Dick Fairhurst =

English footballer

Personal information
- Full name: Richard Fairhurst
- Date of birth: 5 September 1911
- Place of birth: St Helens, England
- Height: 5 ft 10 1/2 in (1.79 m)
- Position: Full back

Senior career*
| Years | Team | Apps | (Gls) |
| | Skelmersdale United | ? | (?) |
| 1931–1934 | Burnley | 23 | (3) |
| 1934–1935 | Hartlepool United | 11 | (0) |
| 1935–1937 | Tranmere Rovers | 30 | (0) |
- * Club domestic league appearances and goals

Richard Fairhurst (born 5 September 1911, date of death unknown) was an English professional association footballer who played as a full back.
