= Reg Edwards (footballer, born 1912) =

English footballer

Personal information
- Date of birth: 1912
- Place of birth: Coseley, England
- Date of death: Unknown
- Position: Centre forward

Senior career*
Years	Team	Apps	(Gls)
19xx–1931	Brierley Hill Alliance	?	(?)
1931–1933	Burnley	18	(5)
1933–19xx	Walsall	?	(?)
- * Club domestic league appearances and goals

Reginald T. Edwards (born 1912, date of death unknown) was an English professional footballer who played as a centre forward. He started his career with Brierley Hill Alliance and joined Football League Second Division club Burnley in June 1931. Edwards made 18 league appearances for Burnley and scored five goals before moving to Walsall in September 1933.
