= Ted Hancock =

English footballer

Personal information
- Full name: Edmund Hancock
- Date of birth: 29 March 1907
- Place of birth: Denaby Main, Yorkshire, England
- Height: 5 ft 7 in (1.70 m)
- Position: Winger

Senior career*
Years	Team	Apps	(Gls)
1931–1933	Denaby United	?	(?)
1931–1933	Gainsborough Trinity	?	(?)
1931–1933	Liverpool	10	(2)
1933–1936	Burnley	123	(31)
1936–1938	Luton Town	27	(3)
1938	Northwich Victoria	?	(?)
1938–1939	Lincoln City	33	(5)
1939	Frickley Colliery	?	(?)
- * Club domestic league appearances and goals

Edmund Hancock was an English professional association footballer who played as a winger.

Following spells at Denaby United and Gainsborough Trinity, he signed for Liverpool in January 1931, before making his debut in March 1932 against Huddersfield Town.

He played ten games for Liverpool before departing for Burnley in 1933.
