= Richard Twist =

English footballer

Personal information
- Place of birth: England
- Position: Goalkeeper

Senior career*
Years	Team	Apps	(Gls)
1931–1932	Burnley	10	(0)
1932–1933	Preston North End	3	(0)
Total		13	(0)
- * Club domestic league appearances and goals

Richard Twist was an English professional footballer who played as a goalkeeper. He played in The Football League for Burnley and Preston North End, making 13 league appearances in total.
