= Tom Willighan =

Irish footballer (1903–1936)

Thomas Willighan
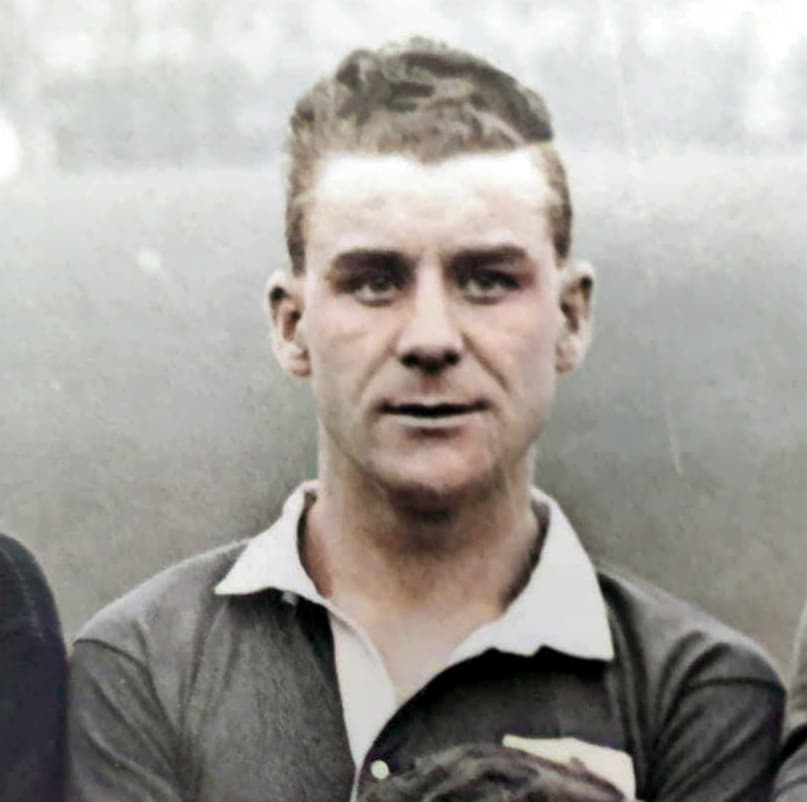
- Making Ireland debut v Wales 1932

Personal information
- Full name: Thomas Willighan
- Date of birth: 22 March 1903
- Place of birth: Belfast, Ireland
- Date of death: 7 July 1936 (aged 33)
- Place of death: Belfast, Northern Ireland
- Position: Full back

Senior career*
| Years | Team | Apps | (Gls) |
| 1923-1925 | Forth River | | |
| 1925-1926 | St. Mary's | | |
| 1926-1928 | Willowfield | | |
| 1928-1934 | Burnley | 61 | |
| 1935-1936 | Linfield | 2 | |

International career
| 1932-1933 | Ireland (IFA) | 2 | (0) |
- * Club domestic league appearances and goals

Tom (Thomas) Willighan (22 March 1903 - 7 July 1936) was an Irish full-back football player. He was capped twice for the Ireland national football team (Northern Ireland), played five seasons for Burnley FC and won leagues and cups during his early days in his hometown of Belfast.

== Early Days ==
Tom Willighan began his playing career in Belfast for Forth River FC, St Mary's FC and Willowfield FC.

He was captain of the St. Mary's team that won the Steel and Sons Cup in the 1925-26 season, beating Summerfield 4-0 in the final. During his time at St. Mary's he was also captain of North-East Juniors (regional team) and was soon called up to play for Ireland Juniors.

After moving to Willowfield FC, he again tasted victory in the Steel and Sons in 1927-28, beating Ormiston 2-1 in a final replay. This was a remarkable season for the club as they won the Irish Cup that year, becoming the first from outside the Irish League to win the Irish Cup since the League's formation in 1890. They defeated Larne 1-0 in the final at Windsor Park. Also that season, Willowfield won the Irish Intermediate League and Irish Intermediate Cup. During his time at Willowfield, Tom Willighan represented the Irish Intermediate League XI.

== Burnley ==
Tom moved to English First Division side Burnley in January 1928 and made his debut against Manchester United in March 1930. However, the team finished in 21st place and were relegated down to the Second Division. He was a strong, robust defender and made sixty-one appearances over a further four seasons for the Lancashire club. His professional career ended in May 1934 after suffering a serious leg injury playing against Manchester United at Old Trafford. Willighan never properly recovered from the injury and returned home to Belfast where he joined Linfield.

== International ==
Willighan twice represented Ireland (now known as Northern Ireland). On 7 December 1932, he was a defender in the 4-1 defeat to Wales at Wrexham and on 16 September 1933 he was in the starting XI that beat Scotland 2-1 in Glasgow.

== Personal life ==
Capt of St. Mary's, Tom Willighan, on the right shakes hands with Cliftonville captain Quinn ahead of the County Antrim Shield match at Solitude on 12th December 1925.

Tom Willighan was the third of ten children born in Cambrai Street, Belfast. He married Alice Bradshaw in Burnley in 1934 and witness to their wedding were Burnley team-mate and best friend George Waterfield, along with wife Nellie. After retiring from professional football he and his wife moved to Belfast for a short time before returning to Burnley in 1936 just before the birth of his son.

Willighan died from cancer on 7 July 1936 at the age of 33.
