= John Hall (1930s footballer) =

English footballer

Personal information
- Place of birth: Hetton-le-Hole, England
- Position: Winger

Senior career*
Years	Team	Apps	(Gls)
1930–1933	Burnley	38	(4)
- * Club domestic league appearances and goals

John Hall was an English professional footballer who played as a winger.
