= Joseph H. Bellis =

American politician (1867–1920)

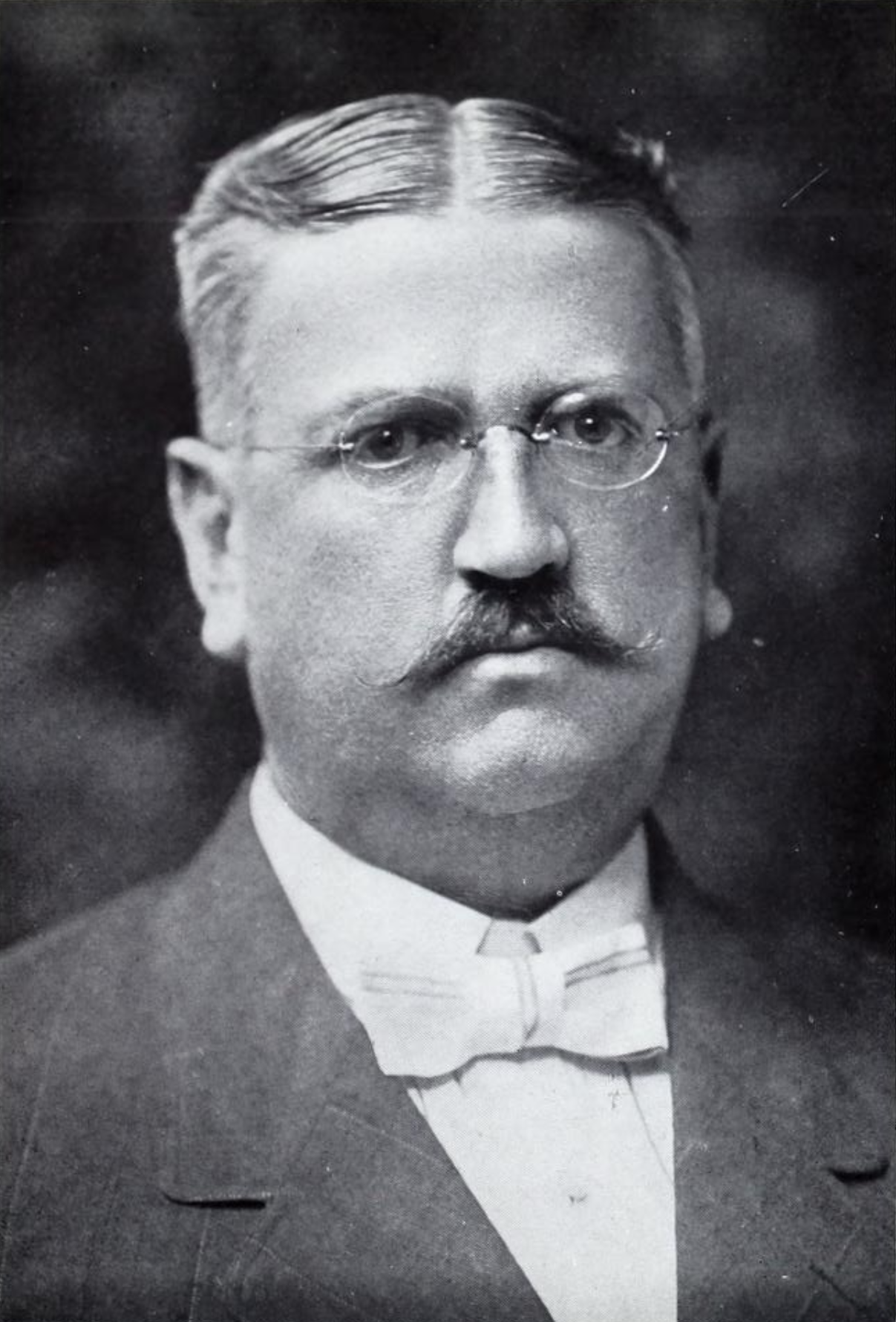
- Bellis in 1914 publication

Member of the Maryland Senate
- In office 1912
- Preceded by: A. Theodore Brady
- Succeeded by: Benjamin Watkins Jr.

Personal details
- Born: April 26, 1867 Annapolis, Maryland, U.S.
- Died: March 1, 1920 (aged 52) Annapolis, Maryland, U.S.
- Resting place: St. Anne's Cemetery; Annapolis, Maryland, U.S.
- Party: Democratic
- Education: St. John's College
- Occupation: Politician; sheriff; businessman

Joseph H. Bellis (April 26, 1867 – March 1, 1920) was a politician from Maryland. He served as a member of the Maryland Senate in 1912 and served as sheriff of Anne Arundel County from 1918 to 1919.

== Early life ==
Joseph H. Bellis was born on April 26, 1867, in Annapolis, Maryland, to Ellen (née Tolson) and William Henry Bellis. He attended private and public schools in Annapolis. He attended St. John's College for three years.

== Career ==
Bellis owned William H. Bellis & Co., a naval outfitter business. He then served as president of the company.

Bellis was a Democrat. He served in the Maryland Senate, representing Anne Arundel County, in 1912. He resigned in anticipation of being elected postmaster of Annapolis, but did get the position. He served as sheriff of Anne Arundel County from 1918 to 1919. Bellis served one term on the Annapolis City Council. He also served as president of the Board of Supervisors of Annapolis. Bellis also as chief marshal of the volunteer fire department of Annapolis. He served three years as president of the Board of Election Supervisors in Anne Arundel County.

Bellis served as a member of the board of governors and visitors of St. John's College.

== Personal life ==
Bellis did not marry. Bellis died on March 1, 1920, at his home in Annapolis. He was buried at St. Anne's Cemetery in Annapolis.
