= Ernie Smith (footballer) =

English footballer (1912–1996)

Personal information
- Full name: Ernest Smith
- Date of birth: 13 January 1912
- Place of birth: Shirebrook, England
- Date of death: 14 October 1996 (aged 84)
- Position: Inside forward

Senior career*
Years	Team	Apps	(Gls)
1931–1934	Burnley	7	(1)
1934–1935	Nottingham Forest	2	(23)
1935–1938	Rotherham United	100	(44)
1938–1939	Plymouth Argyle	12	(5)
Total		121	(73)
- * Club domestic league appearances and goals

Ernest Smith (13 January 1912 – 14 October 1996) was an English professional footballer who played as an inside forward.
