= Ernie Salt =

English footballer (1897–1940)

Personal information
- Full name: Ernest Salt
- Date of birth: 10 February 1897
- Place of birth: Walsall, England
- Date of death: 1940 (aged 42–43)
- Position: Goalkeeper

Senior career*
Years	Team	Apps	(Gls)
1914–1915	Walsall		
1919–1920	Talbot Stead Tube Works		
1921–1922	Everton	4	(0)
1923–1924	Accrington Stanley	72	(0)
1925–1926	Wigan Borough	26	(0)
Total		102	(0)
- * Club domestic league appearances and goals

Ernest Salt (10 February 1897 – 1940) was an English footballer who played in the Football League for Accrington Stanley, Everton and Wigan Borough.
