= Alex Forrest (footballer) =

Scottish footballer

Personal information
- Full name: Alexander Forrest
- Date of birth: 2 April 1905
- Place of birth: Hamilton, Scotland
- Date of death: 1974, Hamilton Scotland
- Positions: Wing half; half back

Senior career*
Years	Team	Apps	(Gls)
	Bo'ness	?	(?)
1927–1933	Burnley	108	(4)
1933–1935	Chesterfield	42	(1)
- * Club domestic league appearances and goals

Alexander Forrest (2 April 1905 – 1974) was a Scottish professional footballer who played as a wing half. Son of Alexander Forrest and Marion Bulloch. Alexander married Eliza Ann Sneddon Dick (1910–1989) 23 October 1928 in Hamilton, Lanark, Scotland.
