= William Wood (footballer, born June 1910) =

English footballer

Personal information
- Full name: William Wood
- Date of birth: 29 June 1910
- Place of birth: Darwen, England
- Date of death: 1958 (aged 47–48)
- Position: Wing half

Senior career*
Years	Team	Apps	(Gls)
1931–1932	Blackburn Rovers	7	(0)
1932–1934	Burnley	7	(0)
1934	Mansfield Town	5	(0)
1935	Chorley		
1936	Darwen		
- * Club domestic league appearances and goals

William Wood (29 June 1910 – 1958) was an English professional footballer who played in the Football League for Blackburn Rovers, Burnley and Mansfield Town.
