= Harry Counsell =

English footballer

Personal information
- Full name: Henry James Counsell
- Date of birth: 10 April 1909
- Place of birth: Preston, England
- Date of death: January 1990 (aged 80)
- Place of death: Burnley, England
- Position: Defender

Senior career*
Years	Team	Apps	(Gls)
19xx–1929	Chorley		
1929–1931	Nelson	3	(0)
1931–1933	Great Harwood		
1933–1935	Clitheroe		
1935–19xx	Lancaster Town		
- * Club domestic league appearances and goals

Henry James Counsell (10 April 1909 – January 1990) was an English footballer who played as a defender. He made three appearances in the Football League Third Division North while playing for Nelson. He also spent several seasons in non-league football.

== Biography ==
Harry Counsell was born in the town of Preston, Lancashire, on 10 April 1909 and attended Great Marsden School in Nelson before beginning his football career. He died in Burnley in January 1990, at the age of 80.

== Playing career ==
Counsell started his career with Chorley in the Lancashire Combination. He moved to Football League Third Division North side Nelson for the 1929–30 season, but did not feature for the first team during the campaign. He made his Football League debut on 28 March 1931, deputising at right-back for the injured Gilbert Richmond in the 0–3 defeat away at Rotherham United. Counsell made two more appearances for the club, including the 2–1 win against Wigan Borough, which proved to be Nelson's final Football League victory. In May 1931, after ten years in the League, Nelson finished bottom of the division and failed re-election. Counsell stayed with the club as they joined the Lancashire Combination for the 1931–32 season, but left shortly afterwards.

Upon leaving Nelson, Counsell signed for fellow Combination side Great Harwood. He stayed with the club for two seasons, helping them to 15th-place and 17th-place finishes, before transferring to Clitheroe in August 1933. Two years later, he joined Lancaster Town (again in the Lancashire Combination), where he ended his career.
