= Frank Allen (footballer, born 1901) =

English footballer

Personal information
- Full name: Frank Allen
- Date of birth: 5 May 1901
- Place of birth: Altofts, England
- Date of death: 30 October 1989 (aged 88)
- Place of death: Ravenshead, England
- Height: 5 ft 9 in (1.75 m)
- Positions: Inside forward; wing half

Youth career
- 1919–1925: Altofts West Riding Colliery

Senior career*
Years	Team	Apps	(Gls)
1925–1926	Castleford Town		
1926–1928	Barnsley	68	(2)
1928–1929	Bangor City		
1929	Port Vale	0	(0)
1929	Clapton Orient	0	(0)
1929–1930	Southport	31	(6)
1930	Nelson	14	(0)
1930–1933	Barrow	67	(11)
1933–1935	New Brighton	51	(18)
1935–1937	Le Havre		
1937–193?	Ollerton Colliery		
Total		233	(37)
- * Club domestic league appearances and goals

Frank Allen (5 May 1901 – 30 October 1989) was an English professional footballer who played as an inside forward and later as a wing half. Originally a coal miner by trade, he became a full-time footballer at the age of 24 and went on to play professionally for the next 11 years. He played for six different teams in the Football League, making over 230 league appearances in total.

== Early and personal life ==
Allen was born on 5 May 1901 in Altofts, West Yorkshire and was brought up in a mining background, which was typical of the area at the time. He started working at Altofts Colliery in 1919 and played part-time football for the Colliery. After he retired from football, he returned to the mines, working at Ollerton Colliery from 1937. He regularly played golf and was a keen gardener, entering several flower shows and gardening competitions. In his later years, he lived in Ravenshead in Nottinghamshire. Allen died from pneumonia on 30 October 1989 at the age of 88.

== Career ==
Allen left Altofts in 1925 to join amateur side Castleford Town, who played in the Midland Football League. Castleford finished bottom of the division in the 1925–26 campaign, but Allen's performances had attracted professional clubs to secure his signature, and he joined Football League Second Division side Barnsley in February 1926 at the age of 24. He was moved from right-half to inside forward to accommodate Dai Jones. He scored two goals in his first 10 matches with Barnsley, but despite playing as an inside forward he failed to get on the scoresheet in the next two seasons and was released by the club at the end of the 1927–28 season having scored two goals in 68 league matches.

Upon his release by Barnsley, Allen joined Bangor City in August 1928. He remained at the club for only six months before transferring to Second Division clubs Port Vale and then Clapton Orient. He failed to make a single first-team appearance for either club, and Orient were relegated in 1928–29; he left Orient to sign for Football League Third Division North side Southport in June 1929. He spent one season at Southport, scoring six goals in 31 league games.

In August 1930, Allen moved to fellow Third Division North club Nelson on a free transfer. He made his debut for the team on 30 August 1930 in the 5–4 away defeat to Rochdale. He played 17 first-team games for Nelson and scored once, in an FA Cup tie. Nelson struggled in the league in the 1930–31 season, eventually failing re-election at the end of the campaign, and Allen departed the club to join Barrow in January 1931 where manager Jimmy Commins signed him for the third time in his career. He was converted into a wing half during his time at Holker Street, and his goalscoring rate was significantly increased as he scored seven goals in his first 18 league matches. Allen left Barrow in August 1933, having played 67 matches and scored 11 goals for the club. Before the start of the 1933–34 season, Allen signed for New Brighton where he played for two seasons, netting 18 times in 51 games, the most prolific period of his career. This tally included a hat-trick against former club Southport on 7 April 1934. In 1935, Allen joined Ligue 2 side Le Havre and subsequently had two years in France before retiring from professional football in 1937.

== Career statistics ==
Appearances and goals by club, season and competition
Club	League			Season	FA Cup		Total	
Club	Division	Apps	Goals	Season	Apps	Goals	Apps	Goals
Barnsley	Second Division	1925–26	10	2	0	0	10	2
Barnsley	Second Division	1926–27	30	0	2	0	32	0
Barnsley	Second Division	1927–28	28	0	1	0	29	0
Barnsley	Total		68	2	3	0	71	2
Port Vale	Second Division	1928–29	0	0	0	0	0	0
Clapton Orient	Second Division	1928–29	0	0	0	0	0	0
Southport	Third Division North	1929–30	31	6	2	1	33	7
Nelson	Third Division North	1930–31	14	0	3	1	17	1
Barrow	Third Division North	1930–31	18	7	0	0	18	7
Barrow	Third Division North	1931–32	18	0	4	0	22	0
Barrow	Third Division North	1932–33	31	4	1	0	32	4
Barrow	Total		67	11	5	0	72	11
New Brighton	Third Division North	1933–34	20	8	4	0	24	8
New Brighton	Third Division North	1934–35	33	10	3	1	36	11
New Brighton	Total		53	18	7	1	60	19
Career total			233	37	20	3	253	40
