= Robert Nuttall =

English footballer

Personal information
- Full name: Robert Nuttall
- Date of birth: 19 November 1906
- Place of birth: Tottington, England
- Date of death: 8 December 1980 (aged 72)
- Place of death: Ramsbottom, England
- Positions: Wing half; centre forward

Senior career*
Years	Team	Apps	(Gls)
19xx–1930	Tottington		
1931–1933	Nelson	4	(0)
1933–1935	Turton		
1935–19xx	Tottington St. John's		
- * Club domestic league appearances and goals

Robert Nuttall (19 November 1906 – 8 December 1980) was an English footballer who played as a winger or as a centre forward during his career. Born in Tottington, Lancashire, he began his playing career with his hometown club before joining Football League Third Division North side Nelson in February 1931. One of Nelson's final signings as a League club, Nuttall made his debut at left-half in the 2–5 defeat to York City on 21 March 1931. He played as a centre forward in the team's following match, a 0–3 defeat away at Rotherham United. After two games out of the side, he returned for the 1–3 defeat against Wigan Borough. Nuttall made his final Football League appearance on the penultimate match of the 1930–31 season, the 1–5 loss to Wrexham on 25 April 1931. At the end of the campaign, Nelson failed their re-election to the League and subsequently joined the Lancashire Combination.

Nuttall was one of the few players who remained at Seedhill following the descent into non-league football, staying with Nelson until November 1933. He subsequently joined Turton and spent two years with the club before returning to his place of birth to sign for amateur side Tottington St. Anne’s in October 1935.
