= Tommy Jones (footballer, born 1907) =

English footballer (1907–1980)

Personal information
- Full name: Thomas William Jones
- Date of birth: 23 March 1907
- Place of birth: Oakengates, England
- Date of death: 24 June 1980 (aged 73)
- Place of death: Telford, England
- Height: 5 ft 8 in (1.73 m)
- Position: Forward

Senior career*
| Years | Team | Apps | (Gls) |
- Oakengates Town
| 1929–1930 | West Bromwich Albion | 0 | (0) |
| 1930–1933 | Burnley | 94 | (24) |
| 1933–1938 | Blackpool | 153 | (38) |
| 1938–1947 | Grimsby Town | 51 | (8) |
| 1947–1948 | Accrington Stanley | 0 | (0) |
- * Club domestic league appearances and goals

Thomas William Jones (23 March 1907 – 24 June 1980) was an English professional footballer. He spent five years at Blackpool in the 1930s, making over 150 Football League appearances for the club. He played as a forward.

== Blackpool ==
Jones made his debut for Blackpool on 4 September 1933, in a 4–3 victory over Fulham at Bloomfield Road. He scored Blackpool's fourth goal. He went on to make a further 32 league appearances for the club in 1933–34, which was Blackpool manager Sandy MacFarlane's first season in charge. He also scored six more goals in his first campaign with the Seasiders, including both Blackpool goals in their 2–1 victory at Bradford City on 23 December.

In Jones's second season with the club, 1934–35, he made 35 league appearances and scored five goals, while in 1935–36, he made 36 league appearances and scored twelve goals, finishing as Blackpool's second-top scorer behind Bobby Finan in Joe Smith's first season as manager. He also scored his first FA Cup goal for the club. It came in their 5–2 fourth-round defeat at Fulham on 25 January 1936.

In 1936–37, Jones again scored twelve league goals; this time, however, in 26 appearances as Blackpool finished runners-up in Division Two and gained promotion to the top flight. He scored four goals in a 7–1 victory over Nottingham Forest at Bloomfield Road on 28 November 1936.

In Jones's final season at Blackpool, 1937–38, he made 23 league appearances and scored two goals. He also scored the only goal of their FA Cup third-round tie at Birmingham City on 8 January 1938. His final appearance for the club occurred on 23 April in the penultimate league game of the season, a single-goal defeat at Grimsby Town.

== Later career ==
Ironically, Jones subsequently joined Grimsby Town for the start of the 1938–39 season, and played until 1947, when he began his final professional season with Accrington Stanley. After retirement he returned to his native Oakengates where he kept a shop.
