= Billy Jeavons =

English footballer

Personal information
- Full name: William Henry Jeavons
- Date of birth: 9 February 1912
- Place of birth: Woodhouse Mill, Sheffield, England
- Date of death: 1992 (aged 79 or 80)
- Position: Winger

Senior career*
Years	Team	Apps	(Gls)
1931–1932	Chesterfield	4	(0)
1932–1933	Burnley	1	(0)
1933–1934	Accrington Stanley	17	(7)
1934	Oldham Athletic	3	(1)
1934–1935	Southport	16	(1)
1935–1936	Wrexham	2	(0)
- * Club domestic league appearances and goals

William Henry Jeavons (9 February 1912 – 1992) was an English professional footballer who played as a winger.
