= Billy Welsh =

English footballer

Personal information
- Full name: William Welsh
- Date of birth: 2 May 1904
- Place of birth: Douglas Water, South Lanarkshire, Scotland
- Date of death: 1978 (aged 73–74)
- Position: Inside forward

Senior career*
Years	Team	Apps	(Gls)
1921	Douglas Water Thistle		
1921–1925	Hearts	17	(4)
1925	→ Dundee United (loan)		
1925–1927	Dundee United	61	(21)
1927–1928	Charlton Athletic	29	(9)
1928–1930	Wigan Borough	57	(16)
1930	Southport	11	(3)
1930–1931	Newport County	6	(1)
1930	→ Connah's Quay & Shotton (loan)		
1931	Wrexham	9	(1)
1931–1934	Gateshead	65	(23)
1934–1936	Hartlepools United	3	(0)
1936	Jarrow		
- * Club domestic league appearances and goals

William Welsh (2 May 1904 – 1978) was a Scottish professional footballer who played as an inside forward. He made appearances in the Scottish and English football league throughout his career.
