= Charles Sandbach =

English footballer

Personal information
- Date of birth: 8 December 1909
- Place of birth: Northwich, England
- Date of death: January 1990 (aged 80)
- Place of death: Bury, England
- Position: Half-back

Senior career*
Years	Team	Apps	(Gls)
1930–1931	Nelson	2	(0)
1931–1933	Northampton Town	0	(0)
1933–1934	Northwich Victoria	?	(?)
- * Club domestic league appearances and goals

Charles Sandbach (8 December 1909 – January 1990) was an English professional footballer who played as a half-back. Born in Northwich, Cheshire, he started his football career midway through the 1930–31 season when he was signed by Football League Third Division North side Nelson to deputise for the injured first-team left-half David Suttie. Sandbach made his league debut on 27 December 1930 in the goalless draw away at Rochdale. The following month, he made a second senior appearance in the 3–2 home win against Halifax Town. Nelson finished bottom of the Third Division North in the 1930–31 and failed in their application for re-election, forcing many players to leave the club in the summer of 1931.

Sandbach subsequently signed for Northampton Town of the Third Division South. Despite spending two years with the club, he did not make an appearance for the first team, and left to join Northwich Victoria in the summer of 1933. At Northwich he played alongside former Nelson teammate Leslie Raisbeck. The team finished 20th in the Cheshire League at the end of the 1933–34 season and Sandbach left the club, his career in football at an end. Sandbach died in Bury, Greater Manchester, in January 1990 at the age of 80.
