= Jack Mustard =

English footballer

Personal information
- Place of birth: Boldon, England
- Height: 5 ft 7 1/2 in (1.71 m)
- Position: Winger

Senior career*
| Years | Team | Apps | (Gls) |
| 1926–1929 | Queens Park Rangers | 37 | (4) |
| 1929–1930 | South Shields | 31 | (4) |
| 1930–1932 | Wrexham | 70 | (17) |
| 1932–1933 | Preston North End | 15 | (5) |
| 1933 | Burnley | 15 | (4) |
| 1933–1934 | Southend United | 20 | (3) |
| 1934–1935 | Crewe Alexandra | 38 | (17) |
| 1935–1936 | Wrexham | 16 | (1) |
| 1936–1938 | New Brighton | 78 | (11) |
- * Club domestic league appearances and goals

John Mustard was an English professional footballer who played as a winger. During his 12-year career, he played for eight different clubs in the Football League.
