= Robert Weaver (antiquary) =

English congregational divine and antiquarian

- Born: 23 January 1773; Trowbridge, Wiltshire, England
- Died: 12 October 1852 (aged 79); Mansfield, Nottinghamshire
- Occupation(s): Congregational divine and antiquarian

Robert Weaver (23 January 1773 – 12 October 1852) was an English congregational divine and antiquarian.

== Biography ==
Weaver was born at Trowbridge in Wiltshire on 23 January 1773, the son of Richard Weaver, clothier, by his wife Mary. He was intended to follow his father's trade, but, preferring to study for the congregational ministry, he entered Rotherham College early in 1794, residing with the president Edward Williams. On 15 February 1802 he became pastor at Mansfield in Nottinghamshire, a charge which he retained till his death. When he went to Mansfield, affairs were in confusion and the congregation had been broken up. He reconstituted it in 1805, and twice enlarged the place of worship, in 1812 and in 1829.

Weaver was an ardent student of the Greek Testament, in which he was accustomed to give instruction to resident pupils. He also took an interest in antiquities, and in 1840 published "Monumenta Antiqua, or the Stone Monuments of Antiquity yet remaining in the British Isles" (London, 12mo), in which he ascribed the remains of pre-Roman times to Phœnician influence and supported his theory by the particulars of similar Canaanitish and Jewish monuments given in the Bible. Weaver died at Mansfield on 12 October 1852, and was buried in the ground attached to the independent chapel.

Besides the work mentioned, he was the author of:

- "The Scriptures Fulfilled", seven lectures, London, 1829, 8vo.
- "Heaven: A Manual for the Heirs of Heaven", London, 1837, 12mo.
- "Education based on Scriptural Principles, the True Source of Individual and Social Happiness", London, 1838, 8vo.
- "The Pagan Altar and Jehovah's Temple", London, 1840, 12mo.
- "The Reconciler: an Attempt to exhibit … the Harmony and Glory of the Divine Government", London, 1841, 8vo.
- "A Complete View of Puseyism", London, 1843, 12mo.
- "Dissent: its Character", London, 1844, 8vo.
- "Rationalism", London, 1850, 12mo.
- "Popery, calmly, closely, and comprehensively considered", London, 1851, 8vo.
