= Denis William Cashmore =

English footballer (1907–1982)

Watford Football Club Programme - 30 Nov 1929

Denis William Cashmore (21 May 1907 – 13 October 1982) was a footballer for Watford Football Club, like his father George Cashmore before him. He played for the club from 1928 until 1932.

== Sources ==
- Watford Association Football Club Official Journal - Watford v. Fulham, 30 November 1929
