= Clifford Merrick =

English footballer

Personal information
- Date of birth: 3 July 1915
- Place of birth: Todmorden, England
- Date of death: May 2004 (aged 88)
- Place of death: Doncaster, England
- Position: Wing half

Senior career*
Years	Team	Apps	(Gls)
1931–1933	Burnley	12	(0)
1933–1935	Swindon Town	46	(0)
- * Club domestic league appearances and goals

Clifford Merrick (3 July 1915 – May 2004) was an English professional footballer who played as a wing half. He was born in Todmorden, West Riding of Yorkshire and played over 50 matches in the Football League for Burnley and Swindon Town during the 1930s.
