= George Bellis =

English footballer

Personal information
- Full name: George Alfred Bellis
- Date of birth: 8 June 1904
- Place of birth: Khadki, British India
- Date of death: 1969 (aged 64)
- Place of death: England
- Height: 5 ft 11 in (1.80 m)
- Position: Defender

Senior career*
Years	Team	Apps	(Gls)
1921–1923	Formby United		
1924–1927	Southport	41	(4)
1927–1929	Wrexham	82	(5)
1929–1932	Wolverhampton Wanderers	42	(0)
1932–1935	Burnley	86	(0)
1935–1937	Bournemouth & Boscombe Athletic	56	(0)
1937–19??	Wellington Town		
- * Club domestic league appearances and goals

George Alfred Bellis (8 June 1904 – 1969) was an English professional footballer who played as a defender.

Bellis' father was serving with the Royal Engineers in India when his son was born. The family moved back to England soon after and settled in Seaforth, Lancashire, where Bellis began to excel at football. He was playing open-age football for top Bootle league side Seaforth Fellowship when he was just sixteen years old and signed for Formby United in August 1921, aged 17.

After two seasons he moved to Southport for three years before moving to fellow Third Division North side Wrexham in 1927. He scored on his debut for the Welsh club, the only goal in a 1–0 win at Chesterfield, and became a mainstay of the team's defence.

Bellis graduated to the Second Division to play with Wolverhampton Wanderers in 1929, and was part of the championship-winning side of 1931–32. Bellis's stay in the top flight lasted only a matter of months before he joined Burnley in December 1932. He was soon awarded the captaincy.

In the close season of 1935 Bellis joined his final league club, Bournemouth and Boscombe Athletic in Division Three South.

In 1937, aged 33, he left to join Wellington Town.

He later moved back to Seaforth and died in the area in 1969, aged 64.
