= Cecil Smith (footballer, born 1904) =

Welsh footballer

Personal information
- Full name: Frederick Cecil Smith
- Date of birth: 30 October 1904
- Place of birth: Marchwiel, Wales
- Date of death: 1977 (aged 72–73)
- Height: 5 ft 9 in (1.75 m)
- Position: Centre forward

Youth career
- –1924: Marchwiel

Senior career*
Years	Team	Apps	(Gls)
1924–????	Oswestry Town		
–1926	Welshpool Town		
1927–1928	Wrexham	46	(26)
1928–1930	Wigan Borough	38	(23)
1930	Notts County	0	(0)
1930–1931	Macclesfield	40	(48)
1931–1932	Stalybridge Celtic		
1932–1936	Burnley	106	(49)
1936–1937	Cardiff City	16	(8)
1937–1938	Stalybridge Celtic		
1938–1939	Rhyl		
1939	Bangor City		
- * Club domestic league appearances and goals

Frederick Cecil Smith (30 October 1904 – 1977) was a Welsh professional footballer who played as a centre forward in the Football League for Burnley, Wrexham, Wigan Borough and Cardiff City.

== Personal life ==
Smith's brother Arthur was also a footballer.

== Career statistics ==
Appearances and goals by club, season and competition
Club	Season	League			National Cup		Other		Total	
Club	Season	Division	Apps	Goals	Apps	Goals	Apps	Goals	Apps	Goals
Wrexham	1926–27	Third Division North	15	13	―		―		15	13
Wrexham	1927–28	Third Division North	31	13	3	1	2 (Note: Appearances in Welsh Cup)	2	36	16
Wrexham	Total		46	26	3	1	2	2	51	29
Macclesfield	1930–31	Cheshire County League	40	48	2	1	7 (Note: 4 appearances and 4 goals in Cheshire Senior Cup, 2 appearances in Cheshire Challenge Cup, 1 appearance in Cheshire Senior Medal Competition)	2	49	54
Career total			86	74	5	2	9	4	100	80
