= Thomas Conway (footballer) =

Association footballer from Northern Ireland

Personal information
- Full name: Thomas Conway
- Place of birth: Belfast, Northern Ireland
- Position: Full back

Senior career*
Years	Team	Apps	(Gls)
1928–1929	Burnley	3	(0)
1932–1933	Northampton Town	3	(0)
- * Club domestic league appearances and goals

Thomas Conway was a professional association footballer from Northern Ireland who played as a full back. He played in the Football League with Burnley and Northampton Town.
