= Jack Martin (footballer, born 1903) =

English footballer

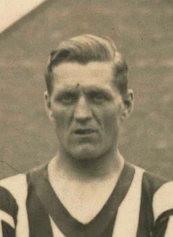
- Martin with Southport F.C. during the 1930/31 season

Personal information
- Full name: John Charles Martin
- Date of birth: 25 July 1903
- Place of birth: Leeds, England
- Date of death: 31 December 1976 (aged 73)
- Place of death: Padiham, England
- Height: 5 ft 10 in (1.78 m)
- Position: Central defender

Senior career*
Years	Team	Apps	(Gls)
1923–1924	Burnley	0	(0)
1924–1926	Accrington Stanley	28	(1)
1926–1927	Blackpool	3	(0)
1927–1929	Southport	73	(2)
1929–1930	Macclesfield Town	29	(1)
1930	Southport	5	(0)
1930–1931	Nelson	27	(1)
1931	Wigan Borough	12	(0)
1931–1932	Oldham Athletic	11	(1)
- * Club domestic league appearances and goals

John Charles Martin (25 July 1903 – 31 December 1976) was an English professional footballer who played as a central defender.

== Career ==
Yorkshire-born Martin crossed the Pennines to begin his career with Lancashire club Burnley in 1923. After failing to break into the Clarets' first team, he joined Accrington Stanley the following year.

The defender made twenty-eight league appearances for Stanley, scoring one goal, before joining Frank Buckley's Blackpool in 1926.

Martin made his debut for the Seasiders on 27 November, in a 2–2 draw with Port Vale at Bloomfield Road. He made two further league appearances in 1926–27, before being released at the end of the season.

He remained in the north-west for the remainder of his career, playing for Southport (two spells), Macclesfield Town, Nelson, Wigan Borough and Oldham Athletic. He retired in 1932, after a nine-year and eight-club playing career.

He is survived by his daughter Irene, born 1925 during his time at Accrington Stanley, her two daughters, Diane and Karen, her grandchildren, Andrew, Laura, Matthew, David and six great grandchildren, Siân, Mason, Anderson, Blake, Ada and Thea. His great-grandsons all followed in his footsteps and were keen amateur footballers in their day;two now coach youth teams in the area. Three of his great-great-grandsons currently play for local teams in Burnley.
