= Bill Wade (footballer) =

English footballer (1901–1958)

William Wade
Personal information
- Full name: William Alexander Wade
- Date of birth: 22 March 1901
- Place of birth: Jarrow, England
- Date of death: 23 August 1958 (aged 57)
- Height: 5 ft 11 in (1.80 m)
- Position: Inside right

Senior career*
Years	Team	Apps	(Gls)
- Jarrow
1923–1929	Preston North End	139	(0)
1929–1931	West Ham United	16	(0)
1931	Wigan Borough	8	(0)
1931–1932	Frickley Colliery		
1932	Nelson		
- * Club domestic league appearances and goals

William Alexander Wade (22 March 1901 – 23 August 1958) was an English professional footballer who played in the Football League for Preston North End, West Ham United and Wigan Borough. He played as an inside right.

== Playing career ==
Wade was born in Jarrow. He made his debut in the Football League with Preston North End. He was a loyal player, representing Preston North End 139 times.

He began the 1931–32 season with Wigan Borough. After twelve matches, the club folded and its results were expunged from official records. Wade had played in eight of those twelve, including their last ever league game, a 5–0 defeat at Wrexham on 24 October 1931. Together with Wigan teammates Alf Oakes and Tommy Moon, Wade signed for non-league Frickley Colliery. He had a brief stint with Nelson before retiring.
