= Charlie Dixon (English footballer, born 1903) =

English footballer

Personal information
- Full name: Charles Hubert Dixon
- Date of birth: 16 June 1903
- Place of birth: Ansley, England
- Date of death: 1 March 1983 (aged 79)
- Place of death: Stafford, England
- Height: 5 ft 11 in (1.80 m)
- Position: Centre-half

Senior career*
Years	Team	Apps	(Gls)
1922–1925	Rugeley Villa	?	(?)
1925–1927	Cannock Town	?	(?)
1927–1928	Sunderland	0	(0)
1928–1929	Bournemouth & Boscombe Athletic	25	(0)
1929	Connah's Quay & Shotton	?	(?)
1929–1930	Southport	19	(0)
1930–1931	Nelson	16	(1)
1931–1932	Hednesford Town	?	(?)
- * Club domestic league appearances and goals

Charles Hubert Dixon (16 June 1903 – 1 March 1983) was an English professional footballer who played as a centre-half. He played a total of 60 matches in the Football League for Bournemouth & Boscombe Athletic, Nelson and Southport.
