= Arthur Bate =

English footballer

Personal information
- Full name: Arthur Bate
- Date of birth: 14 October 1908
- Place of birth: Little Hulton, England
- Date of death: February 1993 (aged 84)
- Place of death: Lancaster, England
- Height: 5 ft 8 1/2 in (1.74 m)
- Position: Centre forward

Senior career*
Years	Team	Apps	(Gls)
1929–1930	Chorley	?	(?)
1930–1931	Nelson	24	(6)
1932	Chorley	?	(?)
1932–1934	Bacup Borough	?	(?)
1934	Fleetwood	?	(?)
1934–1935	Bacup Borough	?	(?)
- * Club domestic league appearances and goals

Arthur Bate (14 October 1908 – February 1993) was an English professional footballer who played predominantly as a centre forward and occasionally as an outside right. Born in Little Hulton, he began his career playing amateur football with nearby club Walkden PM. During this time, Bate had a trial with Football League club Bury but this was unsuccessful and he instead transferred to Little Hulton United. Following a trial with Winsford United in August 1929, Bate joined Lancashire Combination outfit Chorley in October of the same year.

He was signed on professional terms in the summer of 1930 by Football League Third Division North club Nelson. Bate made his League debut on 30 August 1930 and scored a hat-trick, yet still finished on the losing side in a 4–5 defeat to Rochdale. He then scored two goals in the 3–1 victory over Darlington on 6 September 1930. It was then almost two months before he got on the scoresheet again, his sixth goal for Nelson coming in the 1–7 loss away at Tranmere Rovers on 1 November 1930. After suffering a loss of form, Bate was left out of the team for two months in mid-season, before playing a nine games in an unfamiliar outside-right position throughout February and March 1931. After three matches out of the team, he was reinstated as centre-forward for the trip to Barrow on 11 April 1931. He kept his place in the side for the next three matches, Nelson's final games in the Football League. After a total of 24 appearances and six goals, Bate left Nelson following their failed re-election to the League.

In January 1932, Bate rejoined his former club Chorley and played for them until the end of the 1931–32 season, when he left to join Lancashire Combination rivals Bacup Borough. In his first campaign with Bacup, the team struggled in the league, finishing 19th out of 20 teams. Bate continued to play for Bacup Borough through the 1933–34 season, but left in September 1934 to join Fleetwood. However, his spell at the Highbury Stadium was brief and he returned to Bacup in November of the same year, and went on to end his career with the club. Bate died in Lancaster in February 1993, at the age of 84.
