= Bob Weaver (footballer) =

Welsh footballer

Personal information
- Full name: Robert Samuel Weaver
- Date of birth: 1912
- Place of birth: Ponciau, Wales
- Position: Forward

Senior career*
Years	Team	Apps	(Gls)
–1930	Altrincham		
1930–1932	Burnley	6	(0)
1932–1933	Luton Town	3	(1)
1933–1934	Bristol City	3	(0)
Total		12	(1)
- * Club domestic league appearances and goals

Robert Samuel Weaver (born 1912) was a Welsh professional footballer who played as an outside-right or centre-forward.

Weaver played for Altrincham before moving into the Football League with Burnley, Luton Town and Bristol City
