= Billy Harker =

English footballer

Personal information
- Full name: William Harker
- Date of birth: 21 December 1911
- Place of birth: Brierfield, England
- Date of death: 1973 (aged 62–63)
- Position: Inside forward

Senior career*
Years	Team	Apps	(Gls)
1930–1931	Nelson	18	(5)
1931–1933	Burnley	24	(6)
1933–1934	Torquay United	9	(0)
1934–1936	Accrington Stanley	62	(23)
1936–1937	Portsmouth	0	(0)
1937–1939	Stockport County	35	(3)
1939–1940	Rochdale	0	(0)
- * Club domestic league appearances and goals

William Harker (21 December 1910 – 1973) was an English professional association footballer who played as an inside forward for several teams in the Football League.
