= Arthur Hawes (footballer) =

English footballer

Personal information
- Full name: Arthur Robert Hawes
- Date of birth: 2 October 1895
- Place of birth: Swanton Morley, England
- Date of death: 1963 (aged 67–68)
- Height: 5 ft 7 in (1.70 m)
- Position: Inside forward

Senior career*
Years	Team	Apps	(Gls)
	Norwich City	?	(?)
1920–1922	South Shields	52	(18)
1922–1927	Sunderland	139	(39)
1927–1929	Bradford Park Avenue	52	(17)
1929–1930	Accrington Stanley	39	(9)
1930–1931	Nelson	26	(3)
1931–1932	Rochdale	13	(0)
Total		321	(86)
- * Club domestic league appearances and goals

Arthur Robert Hawes (2 October 1895 – 1963) was an English footballer who played for Sunderland as an inside forward. He made his debut for Sunderland on 24 December 1921 against West Bromwich Albion in a 5–0 at Roker Park where he also scored two goals. He played for Sunderland from 1921 to 1927 where he made 139 league appearances and scored 39 goals.
