= Leslie Raisbeck =

English footballer

Personal information
- Full name: Leslie Raisbeck
- Date of birth: 23 May 1907
- Place of birth: Shotley Bridge, England
- Date of death: 24 August 1990 (aged 83)
- Place of death: Consett, England
- Height: 5 ft 10 in (1.78 m)
- Position: Centre forward

Senior career*
| Years | Team | Apps | (Gls) |
| 1925–1926 | Willington | ? | (?) |
| 1926–1927 | Tow Law Town | ? | (?) |
| 1927–1930 | Stockport County | 1 | (1) |
| 1930–1931 | Nelson | 29 | (11) |
| 1931–1932 | Stockport County | 1 | (0) |
| 1932 | Stalybridge Celtic | ? | (?) |
| 1932–1933 | Buxton | ? | (?) |
| 1933–19xx | Northwich Victoria | ? | (?) |
- * Club domestic league appearances and goals

Leslie Raisbeck (23 May 1907 – 24 August 1990) was an English professional footballer who played as a centre forward. He made a total of 31 appearances in the Football League for Stockport County and Nelson, and was Nelson's top scorer in the 1930–31 season with 15 goals.

Raisbeck started his career in local league football with Willington and Tow Law Town before moving to Third Division North side Stockport County in 1927. He Raisbeck made his senior debut for Stockport against Wigan Borough on 1 January 1929 and scored the first goal in a 2–1 win. In July 1930, Raisbeck joined fellow Third Division North club Nelson and scored 11 times in 29 league matches. He also netted four goals in the FA Cup, including a hat-trick against Workington, as the team reached the Second Round.

Nelson finished bottom of the division in 1930–31 and failed re-election to the League; subsequently many of the players left the club and Raisbeck returned to Stockport County. He made one more first-team appearance for the Hatters but was released in April 1932 and went on to play for several non-League clubs in the Cheshire area.
