= Gilbert Richmond =

English footballer

Personal information
- Full name: Gilbert Richmond
- Date of birth: 2 April 1909
- Place of birth: Bolton, England
- Date of death: 14 March 1968 (aged 58)
- Place of death: Halmstad, Sweden
- Height: 5 ft 9 in (1.75 m)
- Position: Full back

Senior career*
Years	Team	Apps	(Gls)
1929–1931	Nelson	21	(0)
1931–1932	Clitheroe	?	(?)
1932–1939	Burnley	176	(1)

Managerial career
- 1947–1948: IS Halmia
- 1949–1953: Heracles
- 1953–1957: USV Elinkwijk
- 1957–1962: Go Ahead
- 1962–1963: IS Halmia
- * Club domestic league appearances and goals

Gilbert Richmond (2 April 1909 – 14 March 1968) was an English professional footballer who played as a full back. He played in the Football League with Nelson and Burnley.

Richmond was manager of Swedish club IS Halmia from 1947 to 1948 and from 1962 to 1963.
