= Sandy McGinn =

Scottish footballer

Personal information
- Full name: Alexander McGinn
- Place of birth: New Cumnock, Scotland
- Height: 5 ft 8 in (1.73 m)
- Position: Midfielder

Senior career*
| Years | Team | Apps | (Gls) |
- Lanemark
| 1913–1919 | Bradford City | 5 | (0) |
| 1919–1925 | Blackpool | 132 | (2) |
| 1925–1926 | Halifax Town | 7 | (0) |
- Great Harwood
- * Club domestic league appearances and goals

Alexander McGinn was a Scottish professional footballer. He spent six years at Blackpool in the 1920s, making over 100 Football League appearances for the club. He also played for Bradford City and Halifax Town.

== Career ==
Born in New Cumnock, McGinn joined Bradford City from Lanemark in March 1914. He made 5 league appearances for the club. He left the club in December 1919 to join Blackpool.

McGinn made his debut for Bill Norman's Blackpool midway through the 1919–20 season, in a goalless draw at Bristol City on 20 December. He went on to make a further nineteen league appearances that season, scoring one goal (in a 3–0 victory at Wolves on 6 March).

In 1920–21, McGinn made 24 league appearances. He scored one goal, in the FA Cup in Blackpool's first-round replay victory at home to Darlington.

McGinn started 34 of Blackpool's 42 league games in 1921–22. He scored one goal, the first in a 2–0 win against Bristol City at Bloomfield Road on 25 March.

36 league starts followed in 1922–23, before a spell out of the line-up in 1923–24 under Blackpool's new manager Frank Buckley. The Major selected him in seventeen of their final nineteen games of the league season, however, as well as in the club's two FA Cup ties in the New Year.

McGinn was out of favour again in 1924–25, managing just one league appearance. That appearance, at Coventry City on 9 March, was his final one for Blackpool.
