= Bert Tulloch =

English footballer

Personal information
- Full name: Albert Tulloch
- Date of birth: 23 February 1889
- Place of birth: Blaydon, England
- Date of death: 15 February 1953 (aged 63)
- Place of death: Blackpool, England
- Height: 5 ft 8 in (1.73 m)
- Position: Defender

Senior career*
| Years | Team | Apps | (Gls) |
- Scotswood
| 1914–1924 | Blackpool | 178 | (0) |
- * Club domestic league appearances and goals

Albert Tulloch (23 February 1889 – 15 February 1953) was an English professional footballer. He played as a full-back, and spent his entire ten-year professional career at Blackpool.

Tulloch made his debut for Blackpool on 24 October 1914, in a 2–1 defeat by Leicester Fosse at Bloomfield Road. He went on to make a further 24 appearances in the 1914–15 season, displacing Jimmy Jones. After four seasons of wartime football, during World War I, Tulloch, under the guidance of new manager Bill Norman, became a regular fixture in the defence in the number-2 shirt. He made 35 league appearances in 1919–20, 40 in 1920–21 (helping the team to consecutive fourth-placed finishes in Division Two).

In 1921–22, Tulloch appeared in all but one of the club's league games, only missing the single-goal home defeat by Bury on 5 September 1921. He split the season between the right- and left-back berths, after the arrival of Bert Baverstock from Bolton Wanderers. Baverstock was installed as captain, but Norman kept faith with Tulloch at left-back for the 1922–23 campaign.

Under new manager Major Frank Buckley, Tulloch's place in the team came under threat by Herbert Jones. Indeed, during the 1923–24 season, Tulloch made only eight appearances. It was at this time that he decided to retire from the game. He returned to the club as trainer and masseur.

== See also ==
- One-club man
