= Harry Mingay =

English footballer (1895–1969)

Personal information
- Full name: Harold Mingay
- Date of birth: 19 October 1895
- Place of birth: Luton, England
- Date of death: 1969 (aged 73–74)
- Height: 5 ft 9 in (1.75 m)
- Position: Goalkeeper

Senior career*
Years	Team	Apps	(Gls)
1919–1924	Blackpool	155	(0)
1924	Clapton Orient	0	(0)
1925–1926	Luton Town	29	(0)
1927	Watford	2	(0)
- Bedford Town
- * Club domestic league appearances and goals

Henry Joseph Mingay (19 October 1895 – 1969) was an English professional football goalkeeper. He spent five years at Blackpool in the 1900s, making over 150 Football League appearances for the club.

== Career ==
Mingay signed for Bill Norman's Blackpool during World War I, and played for the club during the inter-war years. He made his Football League debut for the club on 30 August 1919, in a 4–2 home victory over Leeds City at Bloomfield Road in the opening game of the 1919–20 season. He went on to start all but one of the club's 42 league games that campaign, keeping sixteen clean sheets in the process. Harold Jacklin deputised for the 4–2 defeat at Birmingham City on 11 October.

In 1920–21, Mingay appeared in the first six and final seven league games, his place in the interim taken by Billy Richardson.

Mingay also sat out the opening three games of 1921–22, but he returned to the line-up when Richardson left the club. He initially only appeared for three games, at which point Jack Hacking took over for six games, but Mingay returned for the remaining thirty league games and one FA Cup tie.

Mingay was ever-present in Blackpool's 43 league and cup games of 1922–23. He also kept five consecutive clean sheets during the club's unbeaten run between 28 August and 16 September.

Frank Buckley succeeded Bill Norman for the 1923–24 season, but Mingay kept his place as the club's first-choice goalkeeper for the 26 league games prior to his departure from the seaside. His final appearance occurred on 2 February, in Blackpool's exit game from the FA Cup at Southampton. Jack Hacking stepped up from his position as Mingay's understudy for the remainder of the season.
