= John Charles (English footballer) =

English footballer

Personal information
- Place of birth: Crook, England
- Height: 5 ft 9 in (1.75 m)
- Position: Midfielder

Senior career*
Years	Team	Apps	(Gls)
- Crook Town
1912–1924	Blackpool	228	(30)
- * Club domestic league appearances and goals

John W. Charles was an English professional footballer. He spent his entire professional career at Blackpool in the early 1900s, making over 200 Football League appearances for the club. He played as a midfielder.

== Blackpool ==
Crook-born Charles made his debut for Blackpool in the opening game of the 1912–13 season — a 1–1 draw at Grimsby Town. He went on to be ever-present in the club's 38 league games and two FA Cup ties against Tottenham Hotspur at White Hart Lane. He scored four goals in the league and both of the club's two goals in the FA Cup (the first in a 1–1 draw that took the tie to a replay; the second in a 6–1 defeat).

The following season, 1913–14, Charles made 31 league appearances and scored seven goals.

In 1914–15, he made 35 league appearances and scored six goals, five of which came in the final seven games of the campaign.

Four seasons of inter–war football ensued, after which, in 1919–20, Blackpool had appointed their first full-time manager in Bill Norman. Charles found himself alternating between the right and left flanks as he made 27 league appearances and scored four goals (including the only goal of the game in a victory over Bury at Bloomfield Road on 2 April. He also scored in their 4–1 FA Cup first-round replay victory at Derby County on 14 January.

In 1920–21, Charles appeared in 33 of the Blackpool's 42 league games, scoring three goals (including two in a 3–2 home victory over South Shields on 19 March.

Charles also made 33 league appearances the following 1921–22 season, and found the net on two occasions. The first was the only goal in a victory at Rotherham United on 5 November; the second in another victory, this time the first in a 4–0 result at home to South Shields on 8 April.

A quarter-century of league appearances followed in 1922–23, Blackpool's final season under the guidance of Norman. Charles scored three goals, all in victories (one a single-goal result against Manchester United at Bloomfield Road on 31 March).

Frank Buckley was installed as manager for the 1923–24 campaign, and he selected Charles on only six occasions in the league. He managed to score one goal, however, in a 1–1 draw at home to Stoke City on 15 September. His 241st and final appearance for the club occurred in their FA Cup second-round tie at Southampton on 2 February. The Seasiders lost 3–1.
