= Jimmy Leaver =

English footballer and manager (1897–1959)

Personal information
- Date of birth: 26 December 1897
- Place of birth: Blackburn, England
- Date of death: 1959 (aged 61–62)
- Height: 5 ft 11 in (1.80 m)
- Position: Defender

Senior career*
Years	Team	Apps	(Gls)
1919–1920	Blackburn Rovers	0	(0)
1920–1926	Blackpool	106	(4)
1926–1927	Watford	35	(3)
1928–1932	Mossley		
1932–193?	Stalybridge Celtic		

Managerial career
- 1932–1939: Stalybridge Celtic
- 1939–1940: Mossley
- * Club domestic league appearances and goals

James Leaver (born 26 December 1897, died 1959) was an English professional footballer. He spent six years at Blackpool in the early 1900s, making over 100 Football League appearances for the club. Born in Blackburn, he played as a defender.

== Blackpool ==
Leaver made his debut for Blackpool on 7 February 1920, in a 1–0 victory at Sheffield Wednesday. He went on to make two further appearances (in the succeeding two matches) in the 1920–21 season.

Leaver made four appearances in 1921–22. He also scored his first goal for the club, in a 3–1 victory over West Ham at Bloomfield Road on 6 May in the final league game of the season. In 1922–23, Leaver appeared in over half of the Seasiders' league games. In his 28 starts, he scored one goal – in a 2–1 defeat to Manchester United at Old Trafford on 7 April. Leaver achieved exactly the same stats in 1923–24. This time, however, his goal came in the first game of the league campaign, a 2–2 draw at home to Oldham Athletic on 25 August.

For the 1924–25 term, Leaver made 33 league appearances, his most in a Blackpool shirt. He also helped the club to the fourth round of the FA Cup. The 1925–26 season was Leaver's final one with Blackpool. He made ten league appearances and scored one goal. His strike came in a busy September, during which Blackpool played eight league games, in a 2–2 draw at home to Port Vale.

Leaver left Blackpool to join Watford, joining Mossley in August 1928 where he was immediately made club captain. He left for Stalybridge Celtic in the 1932 close season and later became their manager. He took over as manager of Mossley in August 1939 remaining in that poast until May 1940 when football was ended due to World War II.
