= Herbert Jones (footballer, born 1896) =

English footballer (1896-1973)

Personal information
- Full name: Herbert Jones
- Date of birth: 3 September 1896
- Place of birth: Blackpool, England
- Date of death: 11 September 1973 (aged 77)
- Height: 5 ft 8 in (1.73 m)
- Position: Defender

Senior career*
Years	Team	Apps	(Gls)
- South Shore Strollers
- South Shore
- Fleetwood
1922–1925	Blackpool	94	(0)
1925–1934	Blackburn Rovers	247	(0)
1934–1935	Brighton	37	(0)
1935–?	Fleetwood Town		

International career
1927–1928	England	6	(0)
- * Club domestic league appearances and goals

Herbert Jones (3 September 1896 – 11 September 1973) was an English professional footballer who played as a defender. He played for various clubs in England, including Blackpool, Blackburn Rovers, where he won the FA Cup in 1928, and Brighton. He also played six times for the England national team.

== Early life ==
Jones trained as a plumber before World War I. During the war, he was stationed in France. He took part in the truce of Christmas 1915. He became a pacifist and remained so for the rest of his life.

In the summer of 1915 or 1916 he was hit by shrapnel when a shell exploded nearby. As a result of this injury he was honourably discharged.

== Football career ==
Jones began his football career, whilst still a part-time plumber, with his hometown club, Blackpool, making his debut on 16 December 1922, in a goalless draw against Hull City at Bloomfield Road. He went on to make a further fifteen league appearances during the 1922–23 campaign, in what was Bill Norman's final season in charge of the Seasiders.

Under new manager Major Frank Buckley in 1923–24, Jones made 28 league appearances. He also featured in Blackpool's two FA Cup ties that season.

The following season, 1924–25, Jones appeared in 34 of the club's 42 league dates. He again appeared during the club's FA Cup run, this time helping them to the fourth round. They were knocked out by Blackburn Rovers at Ewood Park by a single goal in front of a crowd of 60,000.

Blackburn approached Blackpool the following season, 1925–26, with a view to signing the defender. Blackpool accepted the £6,000 offer, and in mid-January he moved east across Lancashire. His final appearance for Blackpool occurred on 12 December 1925, in a goalless draw at Wolverhampton Wanderers.

Jones went on to play 247 league games for Rovers spanning from 1925 to 1934. He won the FA Cup with the club in 1928 (see 1928 FA Cup Final). After their relegation to Division Two in 1935–36, Rovers returned to the top flight in 1938–39.

Jones then joined Brighton & Hove Albion for a season, making 37 league appearances.

He finished his career back on the Fylde with Fleetwood Town.

== International career ==
While at Blackburn, Jones received six caps for England. He made his debut for his country against Scotland on 2 April 1927. His final cap was also gained against the Scots, on 31 March 1928.

== Personal life ==
Jones was married to Florence and had one daughter, Ivy, who was born in May 1926. Jones died on 11 September 1973, at the age of 77.

== Honours ==
Blackburn Rovers

- FA Cup: 1927–28
