= Jack Hacking =

England international footballer (1897–1955)

Personal information
- Full name: John Hacking
- Date of birth: 22 December 1897
- Place of birth: Blackburn, England
- Date of death: 31 May 1955 (aged 57)
- Place of death: Accrington, England
- Height: 5 ft 11 in (1.80 m)
- Position: Goalkeeper

Youth career
- Grimshaw Park Co-operative

Senior career*
| Years | Team | Apps | (Gls) |
| 1919–1925 | Blackpool | 32 | (0) |
| 1925–1926 | Fleetwood | | |
| 1926–1934 | Oldham Athletic | 223 | (0) |
| 1934–1935 | Manchester United | 32 | (0) |
| 1935 | Accrington Stanley | 17 | (0) |

International career
| 1928–1929 | England | 3 | (0) |
| | The Football League XI | 2 | (0) |

Managerial career
- 1935–1936: Accrington Stanley
- 1949–1955: Barrow
- * Club domestic league appearances and goals

John Hacking (22 December 1897 – 31 May 1955) was an English footballer who played as a goalkeeper. Born in Blackburn, he played for Blackpool, Fleetwood Town, Oldham Athletic, Manchester United and Accrington Stanley.

== Domestic career ==
=== Blackpool ===
Hacking made his debut for Bill Norman's Blackpool on 24 September 1921, in a 2–0 defeat at Hull City. He was the third goalkeeper Blackpool had used in their first seven league games. He remained in goal for the following five games, all of which Blackpool lost.

With Harry Mingay being Blackpool's first-choice goalkeeper, Hacking didn't start again for the Seasiders until 6 February 1924, under a new manager, Frank Buckley, in a single-goal victory over Manchester United at Bloomfield Road. He went on to appear in the remaining fifteen games of their league campaign, helping them to a fourth-placed finish in Division Two.

Hacking started the first three league games of the 1924–25 season, before being replaced for five games by Algy Wilkinson. He returned for seven games, but another goalkeeper, Len Crompton, took over for 26 of the remaining 27 league games. Hacking returned for a 1–0 defeat at Bradford City on 14 April. It was his final appearance for Blackpool.

=== Oldham Athletic ===
After a season at non-league Fleetwood that finished with a win in the Lancashire Combination Cup Final, Hacking signed for Second Division Oldham Athletic together with close friend and Fleetwood teammate Billy Porter. He went on to make 223 appearances for the club over the next eight seasons, during which he proved to be a model of consistency, being rarely absent from the team. One short spell of absence came at Easter 1930 when the club were candidates for promotion back to Division One, which they had left seven years earlier. With Hacking down with flu, they picked up just one point out of three games, losing home and away to Blackpool, who were promoted with Chelsea at the end of the season, with the Oldham club just two points behind. His three England caps in the 1928–29 season, against Scotland, Wales and Northern Ireland make him Oldham's most-capped England international.

=== Manchester United ===
When Hacking joined Manchester United in March 1934 with 10 games to play, they were second from bottom in the Second Division, three points behind Millwall, who had a game in hand. Their fate remained in doubt until the last game of the season, when Millwall and Manchester United went head-to-head at The Den with Millwall needing just one point from the game to avoid relegation; Hacking kept a clean sheet and Manchester United won 2–0 to remain in the Second Division. Hacking finished the season having conceded just six goals in his 10 appearances, including five clean sheets. He made a further 22 league appearances for Manchester United in 1934–35, plus another two in the FA Cup, but ultimately lost the number one jersey after conceding six goals in two games at the start of February 1935, and left the club at the end of the season.

Ten years later, Hacking made an unusual last appearance for United, when his son, Jack junior, who was also a goalkeeper, was appearing as a wartime guest player in the 1945–46 season; Jack junior was unfit to play in one game, so at the age of 47, Hacking deputised and became the oldest player to appear in a league match that season.

=== Accrington Stanley ===
After leaving Manchester United at the end of the 1934–35 season, Hacking took over as player-manager at Third Division Accrington Stanley, but his playing days only lasted until the end of the year. In appreciation for his long service at Oldham Athletic, he chose to play his final league game for Accrington against Oldham at Boundary Park.

He held the role of manager until the end of the season, but went back into management as secretary-manager of Barrow from May 1949 until his death.

== International career ==
Hacking's three appearances for England came during the 1928–29 season against Northern Ireland on 22 October 1928 (won 2–1), Wales on 17 November 1928 (won 3–2) and Scotland on 13 April 1929 (lost 1–0). As a result, England finished runners-up in the 1928–29 British Home Championship.
