= Harold Jacklin =

English footballer

Personal information
- Date of birth: 6 February 1897
- Place of birth: Chesterfield, England
- Date of death: 1966 (aged 68–69)
- Place of death: Chesterfield, England
- Height: 5 ft 11 in (1.80 m)
- Position: Goalkeeper

Senior career*
Years	Team	Apps	(Gls)
1919–1920	Blackpool	1	(0)
1920–1922	Leeds United	3	(0)
1922–1926	Doncaster Rovers	105	(0)
- * Club domestic league appearances and goals

Harold Jacklin (6 February 1897−1966) was an English footballer who played as a goalkeeper mainly for Doncaster Rovers.

== Playing career ==
He started off in Sheffield Junior football and was signed by Blackpool for the 1919–20 season. He only made one appearance for them as Harry Mingay was first choice, with Jacklin deputising for him in the 4–2 defeat at Birmingham City on 11 October.

Joining Leeds United in 1920, where he was the understudy to Billy Down, he made two FA Cup appearances in his first season, and three league appearances in his second season.

His move in 1922 to Doncaster was more successful, playing a total of 117 league and cup games. His former Leeds colleague, Billy Down, joined him at Doncaster in 1925 and once more Harold became second choice, leaving the club at the end of the 1925−26 season.
