= Gazeley =

Village in Suffolk, England

Coordinates: 52.247904°N 0.518245°E

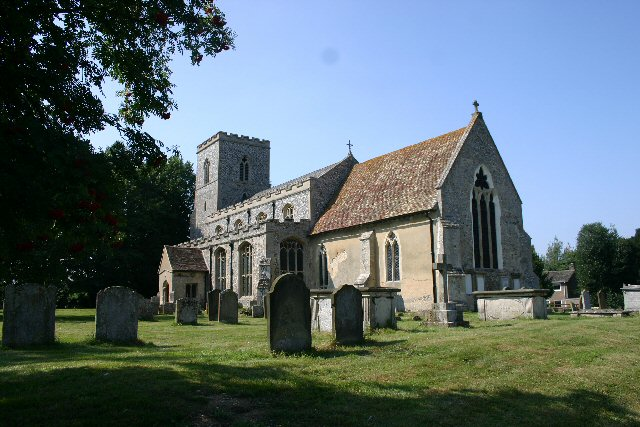
- Gazeley, Church of All Saints

- Location within Suffolk
- Population: 686 (2011)
- OS grid reference: TL720641
- District: West Suffolk
- Shire county: Suffolk
- Region: East
- Country: England
- Sovereign state: United Kingdom
- Post town: Newmarket
- Postcode district: CB8
- Police: Suffolk
- Fire: Suffolk
- Ambulance: East of England
- UK Parliament: West Suffolk

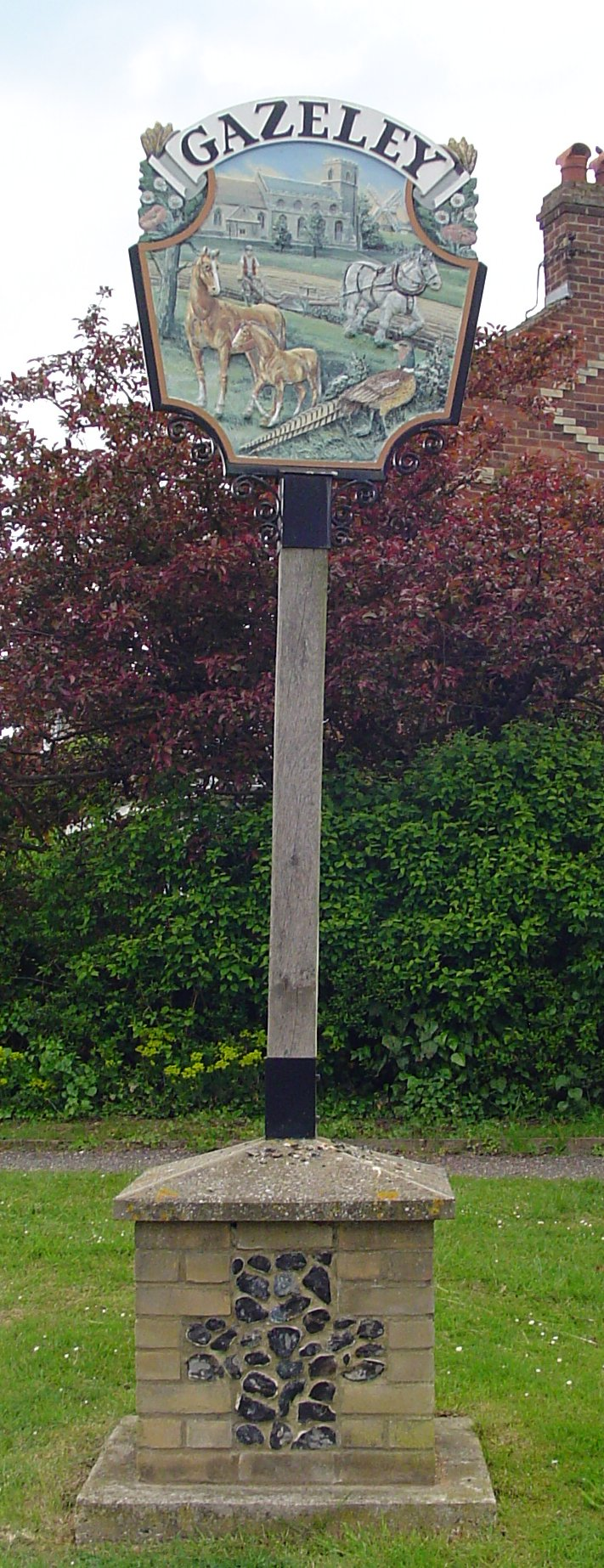
Signpost in Gazeley

Gazeley is a village and civil parish in the West Suffolk district of Suffolk in eastern England and is part of the West Suffolk UK Parliament constituency. In 2005 it had a population of 740. A house converted from a windmill survives in the village. The surnames of Gazeley, Gazley and Gazlay derive from this source.

The Icknield Way Path passes through the village on its 110-mile journey from Ivinghoe Beacon in Buckinghamshire to Knettishall Heath in Suffolk. The Icknield Way Trail, a multi-user route for walkers, horse riders and off-road cyclists also passes through the village.

== Notable people ==
- Bill Norman, football manager

== Nearby ==
- (5.0 mi) from Newmarket, Suffolk

== See also ==
- Desning Hall
