= Malcolm Butler (Irish footballer) =

Northern Irish footballer (1913–1987)

Personal information
- Full name: Malcolm Partridge Butler
- Date of birth: 6 August 1913
- Place of birth: Belfast, Northern Ireland
- Date of death: December 1987 (age 74)
- Height: 5 ft 8 in (1.73 m)
- Position: Full back

Youth career
- Elmgrove

Senior career*
| Years | Team | Apps | (Gls) |
| –1935 | Belfast Celtic | | |
| 1935–1939 | Blackpool | 25 | (0) |
| 1947–1948 | Accrington Stanley | 32 | (0) |
| Total | | 57 | (0) |

International career
| 1939 | Ireland | 1 | (0) |
- * Club domestic league appearances and goals

Malcolm Partridge Butler (6 August 1913 – December 1987) was a Northern Irish professional footballer who played as a full-back in The Football League for Blackpool and Accrington Stanley. He also won one cap for Ireland.

== Club career ==
Belfast-born Butler left Belfast Celtic to sign for Blackpool in January 1935. His four-year career with the club was ended by the outbreak of the Second World War.

During the war he guested for both Chelsea and Brighton, playing around his time as a Flight-Lieutenant navigator in the Royal Air Force.

In July 1947 he signed with Accrington Stanley, and captained the club to a sixth-place finish in the Football League Third Division North before retiring in May 1948.

== International career ==
On 15 March 1939, he played for Ireland in their 3–1 defeat to Wales. It was the country's last match before World War II.

== Post-retirement ==
After leaving the game he became a licensee in Blackpool.
