= Bert Baverstock =

English footballer

Personal information
- Full name: Herbert Baverstock
- Date of birth: January 1883
- Place of birth: Dudley, England
- Date of death: 15 December 1951 (aged 68)
- Place of death: Bolton, England
- Height: 6 ft 1/2 in (1.84 m)
- Position: Full back

Senior career*
Years	Team	Apps	(Gls)
- Netherton St. James
- Brierley Hill Alliance
1905–1921	Bolton Wanderers	366	(4)
1921–1922	Blackpool	18	(1)
Total		384+	(5+)
- * Club domestic league appearances and goals

Herbert Baverstock (January 1883 – 15 December 1951) was an English professional footballer who made over 360 appearances in the Football League for Bolton Wanderers. A full back, he made 388 appearances and scored four goals for the club.

== Personal life ==
Baverstock was married with two children and worked as an upholsterer. He served as a private in the Royal Flying Corps (latterly the Royal Air Force) during the First World War.

== Career statistics ==
Appearances and goals by club, season and competition
Club	Season	League			FA Cup		Total	
Club	Season	Division	Apps	Goals	Apps	Goals	Apps	Goals
Bolton Wanderers	1914–15	First Division	27	0	2	0	29	0
Career total			27	0	2	0	29	0

== Honours ==
Bolton Wanderers

- Football League Second Division: 1908–09
- Football League Second Division second-place promotion: 1910–11
