= Segantii Capital Management =

Hong Kong hedge fund investment firm

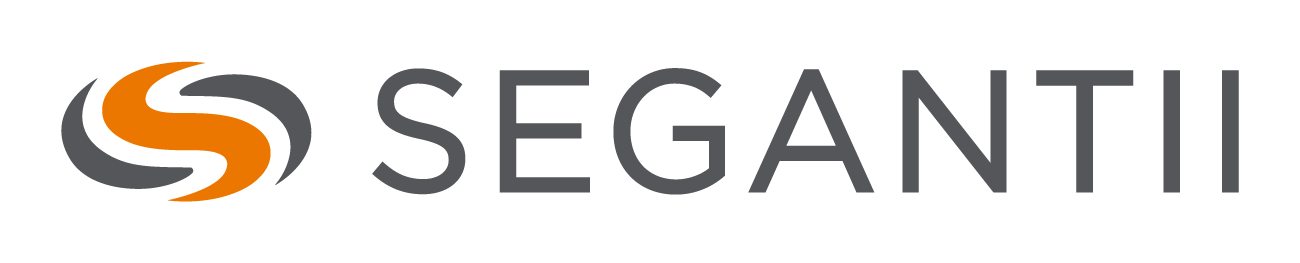

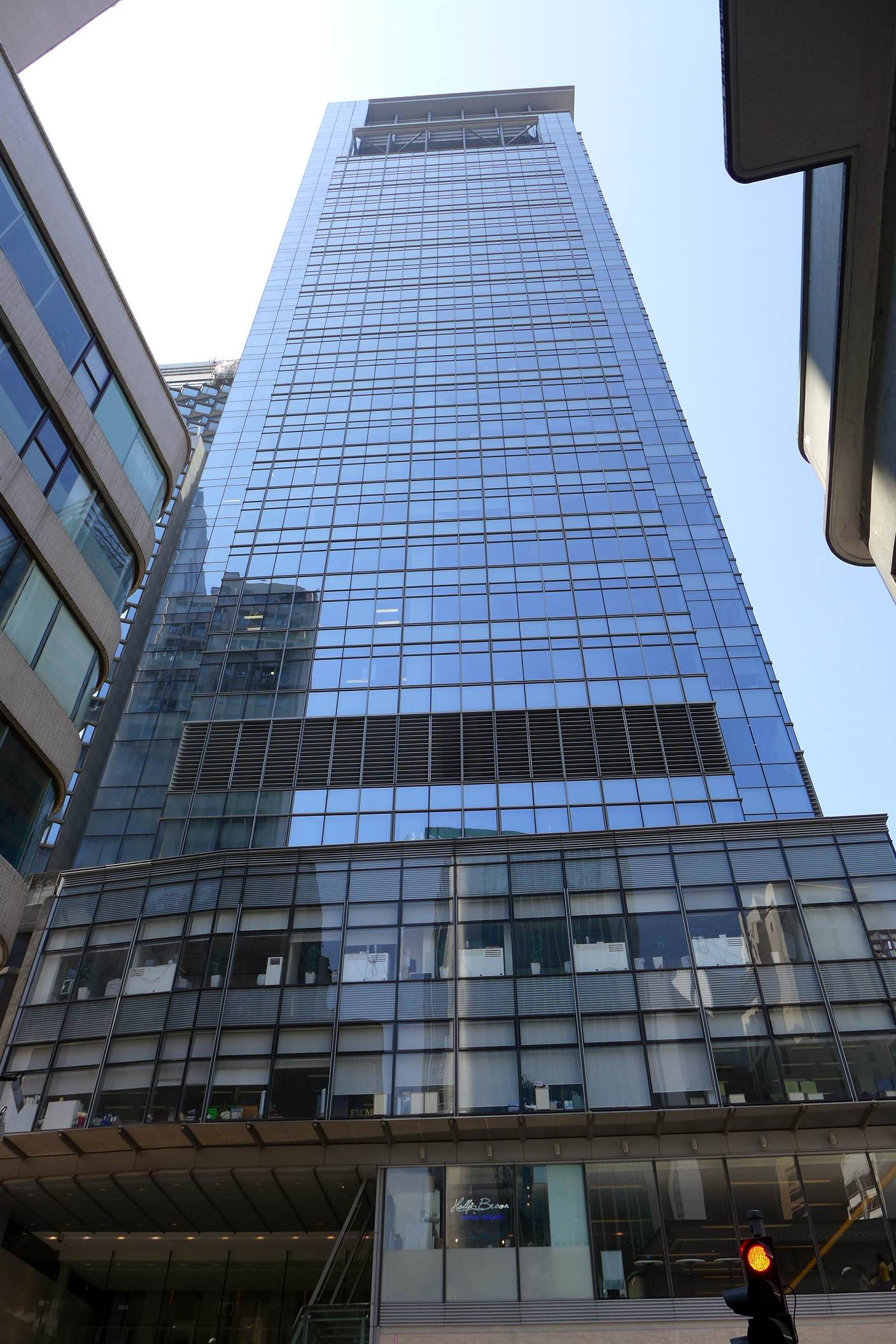
- Office at 100 Queen's Road Central
- Company type: Private
- Industry: Hedge fund
- Founded: 2007 (19 years ago)
- Founder: Simon Sadler
- Headquarters: Hong Kong
- Key people: Kurt Ersoy (CEO)
- AUM: US$4.8 billion (March 2024)
- Number of employees: 151 (March 2024)
- Website: segantii.com

Segantii Capital Management (Segantii) was a hedge fund management firm headquartered in Hong Kong. The firm developed a multi-strategy investment approach and is known as one of the biggest players in Asia for block trades.

Its founder and owner was Simon Sadler, who also owns Blackpool Football Club.

== Background ==
Segantii was founded in 2007 by Simon Sadler. Sadler was previously the head of Asian equity trading for HSBC Securities in Hong Kong. Sadler currently holds a 75% stake in the firm.

In 2008, when Asian hedge funds lost 20% due to the 2008 financial crisis, Segantii had a return of 23.8%.

In 2011, Segantii had a return of 40.75% when the Eurekahedge Asian index fell 7.4%.

In 2014, after two straight years of underperformance, the firm was hit with the resignation of six employees including its chief operating officer.

The firm's flagship fund is the Asia-Pacific Equity Multi-Strategy Fund. The fund employs two strategies, relative value and event-driven. In 2018, it posted a return of 11.36% and an annualized return of 17.6% over the past five years.

According to former employees and counterparties, the culture at Segantii has been described as hard charging.

In January 2024, Segantii's assets declined to about $4.8 billion resulting from investors withdrawing their capital due to poor performance. This was the second time the firm recorded an annual loss with the first being in 2013.

Towards the end of May 2024, Sadler told investors that Sengatii will be closing its hedge fund. This came a few weeks after Hong Kong authorities charged the firm with insider trading. Clients had asked to withdraw almost US$ 1 billion from the fund.

== Regulatory issues ==
=== Block Trades ===
Segantii participates in block trades and is one of the largest players in Asia.

In May 2022, Bank of America and Citigroup suspended all equity trading activities with Segantii due to their concerns on the firm's bets on large scale block trades. This edict was considered very rare for a firm with such a big name and size. During the same year, the U.S. Securities and Exchange Commission was conducting an investigation into block trades. US authorities had sought communications between Morgan Stanley and a former employee of Segantii. However Segantii has not been accused of wrongdoing and it is not known if it has been contacted as part of the US investigation.

In December 2023, Korea regulators fined Segantii $1.15 million in connection with “certain hedging trades” after it purchased SK Hynix stock in a block transaction in October 2019.

=== Insider trading ===
In May 2024, the Securities and Futures Commission started criminal proceedings against Segantii and Sadler accusing them of possessing insider information about Esprit Holdings shares in June 2017 from a former Merrill Lynch employee. In response to the case, JPMorgan Chase and Nomura Holdings limited their dealings with Segantii.
