= Simon Sadler (businessman) =

Owner of Blackpool F.C

- Born: Simon Peter Sadler; 18 October 1969 (age 57); Blackpool, Lancashire, England
- Education: UMIST
- Occupation: Businessman
- Known for: Founder of Segantii Capital Management; Owner and chairman of Blackpool F.C. (since 13 June 2019)

Simon Peter Sadler (born 18 October 1969) is a British businessman, founder of Segantii Capital Management and the current owner of Blackpool Football Club. He acquired the club out of receivership in 2019, purchasing a 96.2% share in the club, ending the Oyston family's 32-year ownership in the process.

In his second full season as Blackpool's owner, the club won promotion to the second tier of English football after an absence of six years.

== Career ==
Sadler has worked in investment banking in London, Moscow and Hong Kong for large multinationals, including HSBC, until eventually founding his own capital firm, Segantii Capital, in 2007. (Segantii is the name of pre-Roman tribe from the Blackpool area.) As of 2022, Segantii had a portfolio worth £3.5 billion.

Towards the end of May 2024, Sadler told investors that Sengatii will be closing its hedge fund. This came a few weeks after Hong Kong authorities charged the firm with insider trading. Clients had asked to withdraw almost US$1 billion from the fund.

He has been described as a "tough but fair character" in the business world.

=== Blackpool F.C. ===
In 2014, Sadler bought Stanley Matthews' FA Cup winners' medal from 1953 for £220,000. Five years later, he purchased Blackpool F.C. for around £10 million.

Blackpool won promotion to the EFL Championship, England's second tier of professional football, in Sadler's first full season of ownership. After the promotion, Sadler explained that he alone cannot fund the investment needed by the club, that it is supported by season-ticket purchases.

In January 2025, it was revealed that Sadler was looking to sell the club as he faces accusations of insider trading with Segantii.

In the six years between 2019 and 2025, Sadler has appointed seven full-time managers of Blackpool: Simon Grayson (2019–2020), Neil Critchley (2020–2022 and 2023–2024), Michael Appleton (2022–2023), Mick McCarthy (2023), Steve Bruce (2024–2025) and Ian Evatt (2025–present).

== Personal life ==
Sadler grew up on Bispham Road in Bispham, Blackpool. He once had a summer job renting out deckchairs.

He attended Moor Park Primary School, Warbreck School and Blackpool and The Fylde College. He completed a Business Science undergraduate degree at UMIST.

He owns a pug, which he named Kenny, after Kenny Dougall, who scored both of Blackpool's goals in their 2021 EFL League One play-off final victory over Lincoln City.

Sadler is married to Gillian and has two children. During the COVID-19 pandemic, the Sadlers relocated from Hong Kong to London, partly because he has become less involved with Segantii's main base in Hong Kong and partly to focus on running the football club.
