= Harry Bedford (footballer) =

English footballer (1899–1976)

Personal information
- Full name: Henry Bedford
- Date of birth: 15 October 1899
- Place of birth: Calow, England
- Date of death: 24 June 1976 (aged 76)
- Place of death: Derby, England
- Height: 5 ft 8 1/2 in (1.74 m)
- Position: Forward

Youth career
- –1919: Grassmoor Ivanhoe

Senior career*
Years	Team	Apps	(Gls)
1919–1921	Nottingham Forest	18	(8)
1921–1925	Blackpool	172	(112)
1925–1930	Derby County	203	(142)
1930–1932	Newcastle United	30	(17)
1932	Sunderland	7	(2)
1932–1933	Bradford Park Avenue	33	(15)
1933–1934	Chesterfield	25	(12)
Total		488	(308)

International career
1923–1924	England	2	(1)

Managerial career
- Heanor Town
- * Club domestic league appearances and goals

Henry Bedford (15 October 1899 – 24 June 1976) was an English professional footballer who played as a forward. He scored 308 league goals in 488 league appearances.

== Club career ==
Harry Bedford began his playing career playing with hometown club Bonds Main FC and then joined his older brother Walter, at Grassmoor Ivanhoe FC in the Chesterfield League. It was here both brothers were invited for trials with Nottingham Forest FC in 1916. During the war years Harry made two appearances for Forest and also played in a match for Huddersfield Town. Second division Forest signed Harry as a professional after the war in August 1919. He made 5 appearances and scored 3 goals in his first season and after scoring 5 in 13 matches of the 1920–21 season, he left for Blackpool on 8 March 1921, for a fee of £1,200.

He made his debut for the Tangerines in a 1–0 league defeat at South Shields on 12 March 1921 and scored his first goal for the club in the return match at Bloomfield Road seven days later. In 1921–22, his first full season, he managed 11 goals and scored in their one FA Cup match. The following two years saw him finish the season as not only Blackpool's top scorer but also the football leagues. In the 1922–23 season he played in all 42 league games and scored 32 goals, then one better in 1923–24, the country's top scorer with 33 goals, a feat which only Jimmy Hampson equalled. In 1924–25, Bedford's goals helped Blackpool reach the fourth round of the FA Cup for the first time and he scored 24 goals in 40 league games. Bedford started the 1925–26 season scoring 6 goals in 7 matches, before he was transferred to Derby County for £3,900 on 25 September 1925. Title chasing Derby required a centre forward after Stan Fazackerley was abruptly forced to retire through injury. Bedford had scored 112 goals in 172 league games and scored 6 goals in 11 FA Cup appearances.

His Rams debut was at the City Ground helping his new side beat his old side 2–1. His home debut came against Swansea, scoring a hat-trick in a 5–0 victory. He hit two more hat-tricks against Stoke City and Sheffield Wednesday as he finished top scorer with 27 goals for the Rams, who won promotion finishing as runners up to Sheffield Wednesday. His form continued in the first division, ending the next four seasons as the club's top scorer. He made 203 league appearances and scored 142 goals and in his 15 FA Cup matches he scored 10 goals.

In December 1930, with the prolific Jack Bowers the preferred centre forward, he was transferred to Newcastle United, the 31-year-old costing £4,000 to replace the outgoing Hughie Gallacher on Tyneside. In February he scored for the Magpies in their 5–1 win at the Baseball Ground. He ended the season with 12 goals in 23 league games. He had scored 5 goals in 7 matches the next season before leaving for rivals Sunderland in January 1932, making 7 appearances, scoring twice. He was back in the second division for the start of the 1932–33 season, after signing for Bradford Park Avenue where he scored 15 goals in 33 matches. The following season he was playing in the Third Division North, with Chesterfield. He then became player-manager of non-League Heanor Town.

He died in Derby on 24 June 1976.

== International career ==
Bedford was capped twice for England. He made his debut in a friendly match against Sweden on 21 May 1923, included in England's end of season tour of Scandinavia. England won 4–2. His only other England cap came in a British Home Championship match against Ireland on 22 October 1924, at Goodison Park, Liverpool. He scored England's second goal in a 3–1 victory.

== Managerial career ==
In October 1937 he joined the backroom staff at Newcastle United as a masseur and later took the same position at Derby County. He moved into management in 1954 with Belper Town before making a return to Heanor Town, a position he held until he resigned in 1955.

== Blackpool F.C. Hall of Fame ==
Bedford was inducted into the Hall of Fame at Bloomfield Road, when it was officially opened by former Blackpool player Jimmy Armfield in April 2006. Organised by the Blackpool Supporters Association, Blackpool fans around the world voted on their all-time heroes. Five players from each decade are inducted; Bedford is in the pre-1950s.

== Career statistics ==
=== Club statistics ===
Appearances and goals by club, season and competition
Club	Season	Division	League		FA Cup		Other		Total	
Club	Season	Division	Apps	Goals	Apps	Goals	Apps	Goals	Apps	Goals
Nottingham Forest	1919–20	Second Division	5	3	0	0	0	0	5	3
Nottingham Forest	1920–21	Second Division	13	5	2	1	0	0	15	6
Nottingham Forest	Total		18	8	2	1	0	0	20	9
Blackpool	1920–21	Second Division	11	6	0	0	0	0	11	6
Blackpool	1921–22	Second Division	32	11	1	1	0	0	33	12
Blackpool	1922–23	Second Division	42	32	1	0	0	0	43	32
Blackpool	1923–24	Second Division	40	33	2	1	0	0	42	34
Blackpool	1924–25	Second Division	40	24	7	4	0	0	46	28
Blackpool	1925–26	Second Division	7	6	0	0	0	0	7	6
Blackpool	Total		172	112	11	6	0	0	183	118
Derby County	1925–26	Second Division	31	27	4	1	0	0	35	28
Derby County	1926–27	First Division	33	22	2	4	0	0	35	26
Derby County	1927–28	First Division	38	27	3	1	0	0	41	28
Derby County	1928–29	First Division	41	27	3	3	0	0	44	30
Derby County	1929–30	First Division	42	30	3	1	0	0	45	31
Derby County	1930–31	First Division	18	9	0	0	0	0	18	9
Derby County	Total		203	142	15	10	0	0	218	152
Newcastle United	1930–31	First Division	23	12	2	1	0	0	25	13
Newcastle United	1931–32	First Division	7	5	0	0	0	0	7	5
Newcastle United	Total		30	17	2	1	0	0	32	18
Sunderland	1931–32	First Division	7	2	0	0	0	0	7	2
Bradford Park Avenue	1932–33	Second Division	33	15	0	0	0	0	33	15
Chesterfield	1933–34	Third Division North	25	12	0	0	1 (Note: Appearance in the Football League Third Division North Cup)	0	26	12
Career total			488	308	30	18	1	0	519	326

=== International statistics ===
Appearances and goals by national team and year
National team	Year	Apps	Goals
England	1923	1	0
England	1924	1	1
Total		2	1

=== International goals ===
Scores and results list England's goal tally first. Score after each Bedford goal is shown in bold with asterisk.

List of international goals scored by Harry Bedford
No.	Date	Venue	Opponent	Cap	Minute	Score	Result	Competition
1	22 October 1924	Goodison Park, Liverpool, England	Ireland	2	60'	**2***–1	3–1	1924–25 British Home Championship
