= 1923–24 Blackpool F.C. season =

English football club season

Blackpool F.C.
1923–24 season
- Manager: Major Frank Buckley
- Division Two: 4th
- FA Cup: Second round
- Top goalscorer: League: Harry Bedford (32); All: Harry Bedford (33)
Home colours

The 1923–24 season was Blackpool F.C.'s 23rd season (twentieth consecutive) in the Football League. They competed in the 22-team Division Two, then the second tier of English football, finishing fourth.

Major Frank Buckley became the club's new manager prior to the start of the season, succeeding Bill Norman.

The team first began wearing tangerine for this season, after a recommendation from referee Albert Hargreaves, who officiated a Holland-Belgium international match and was impressed by the Dutchmen's colours. For the 2023–24 season, Blackpool wore a specially designed shirt to mark their centenary in tangerine.

Harry Bedford was the club's top scorer for the third consecutive season, with 33 goals in all competitions (32 in the league and one in the FA Cup).

Bert Tulloch retired this season, after ten years of service for Blackpool, his only professional club.

== Season synopsis ==
Draws were the common theme for the first month of Blackpool's League campaign, with five of them occurring in the first six games. They remained without a win until 29 September, a 2–0 scoreline at Crystal Palace.

October brought two wins, one draw and one defeat, and this inconsistency continued until March.

A 2–1 home victory over Brighton on 1 March started a run of four successive wins, which included nine goals by Jimmy Hampson, and they remained undefeated until 21 April.

A final-day win over Clapton Orient at Bloomfield Road secured fourth spot from Southampton.

== Table ==
Pos	Team	Pld	W	D	L	GF	GA	GAv	Pts	Promotion or relegation
2	Bury (P)	42	21	9	12	63	35	1.800	51	Promotion to the First Division
3	Derby County	42	21	9	12	75	42	1.786	51	
4	Blackpool	42	18	13	11	72	47	1.532	49	
5	Southampton	42	17	14	11	52	31	1.677	48	
6	Stoke	42	14	18	10	44	42	1.048	46	

(P) Promoted

== Transfers ==
=== In ===
Date	Player	From	Fee

=== Out ===
Date	Player	From	Fee
