= 1924–25 Blackpool F.C. season =

English football club season

Blackpool F.C.
1924–25 season
- Manager: Major Frank Buckley
- Division Two: 17th
- FA Cup: Fourth round
- Top goalscorer: League: Harry Bedford (24); All: Harry Bedford (28)
Home colours

The 1924–25 season was Blackpool F.C.'s 24th season (21st consecutive) in the Football League. They competed in the 22-team Division Two, then the second tier of English football, finishing seventeenth.

Harry Bedford was the club's top scorer for the fourth consecutive season, with 28 goals in total (24 in the league and four in the FA Cup).

== Season synopsis ==
Four victories in their opening six League fixtures put the Seasiders in and around the top of the table for the first couple of weeks of the campaign; however, the wheels started to fall off from that point onwards. Ten further victories were offset by nineteen defeats, which left the club three points above the drop zone at the end of the season.

Their FA Cup journey ended in the fourth round, the only stage that they did not have to replay. It was the furthest they had ventured in the tournament to date.

== Table ==
Pos	Team	Pld	W	D	L	GF	GA	GAv	Pts
15	Barnsley	42	13	12	17	46	59	0.780	38
16	Bradford City	42	13	12	17	37	50	0.740	38
17	Blackpool	42	14	9	19	65	61	1.066	37
18	Oldham Athletic	42	13	11	18	35	51	0.686	37
19	Stockport County	42	13	11	18	37	57	0.649	37

== Transfers ==
=== In ===
Date	Player	From	Fee

=== Out ===
Date	Player	From	Fee
