= 1922–23 Blackpool F.C. season =

English football club season

Blackpool F.C.
1922–23 season
- Manager: Bill Norman
- Division Two: 5th
- FA Cup: First round
- Top goalscorer: League: Harry Bedford (32); All: Harry Bedford (32)
Home colours

The 1922–23 season was Blackpool F.C.'s 22nd season (nineteenth consecutive) in the Football League. They competed in the 22-team Division Two, then the second tier of English football, finishing fifth.

Harry Bedford was the club's top scorer for the second consecutive season, with 32 goals.

== Season synopsis ==
After two opening draws, four consecutive wins kickstarted Blackpool's League campaign. Inconsistency came into play once more, with victories being interspersed with draws and defeats.

Nine wins in the second half of the season assisted in their fifth-placed finish.

The FA Cup saw another first-round exit, this time at Derby County.

== Table ==
Pos	Team	Pld	W	D	L	GF	GA	GAv	Pts
3	Leicester City	42	21	9	12	65	44	1.477	51
4	Manchester United	42	17	14	11	51	36	1.417	48
5	Blackpool	42	18	11	13	60	43	1.395	47
6	Bury	42	18	11	13	55	46	1.196	47
7	Leeds United	42	18	11	13	43	36	1.194	47

== Transfers ==
=== In ===
Date	Player	From	Fee
1922	Frank Watson	Aston Villa

=== Out ===
Date	Player	From	Fee
