= Frank Buckley (footballer) =

English footballer and manager

Major Frank Buckley

Personal information
- Full name: Franklin Charles Buckley
- Date of birth: 9 November 1882
- Place of birth: Urmston, England
- Date of death: 21 December 1964 (aged 82)
- Place of death: Walsall, England
- Height: 5 ft 11 in (1.80 m)
- Position: Defender

Senior career*
Years	Team	Apps	(Gls)
1902–1904	Aston Villa	0	(0)
1904–1905	Brighton & Hove Albion	25	(2)
1905–1906	Manchester United	3	(0)
1907–1908	Manchester City	11	(0)
1909–1913	Birmingham	55	(4)
1913–1914	Derby County	92	(3)
1913–1914	Bradford City	4	(0)
1919–1920	Norwich City	1	(0)
Total		191	(9)

International career
1914	England	1	(0)

Managerial career
- 1919–1920: Norwich City
- 1923–1927: Blackpool
- 1927–1944: Wolverhampton Wanderers
- 1944–1946: Notts County
- 1946–1948: Hull City
- 1948–1953: Leeds United
- 1953–1955: Walsall
- * Club domestic league appearances and goals

Franklin Charles Buckley (more commonly known as Major Frank Buckley) (9 November 1882 – 21 December 1964) was an English football player and, later, manager. He was the brother of Chris Buckley, who played for Aston Villa.

== Early life ==
Buckley was born in Urmston, Lancashire. He attended St Francis Xavier's College, Liverpool, and became an office clerk. Already part of the Manchester Regiment, Buckley signed up for a 12-year enlistment in King's Regiment (Liverpool) and expected to serve in the Boer War, but was instead sent to Ireland. He bought himself out of the army in 1902 to become a professional footballer.

== Playing career ==
He went from Aston Villa to Brighton and Hove Albion to Manchester United and Manchester City all within six years, and found something approaching stability only with Birmingham, where he made 56 appearances. Soon after that he was on the move again, this time to Derby County. It was with the Rams, in 1914, that he gained his sole England cap, in a shock 3–0 defeat by Ireland at Ayresome Park, before upping sticks, again, to join Bradford City; his stay in Yorkshire shortened by the start of the First World War.

== Managerial career ==
=== Army service, and introduction to management ===
Buckley went to war with the 17th Middlesex Regiment (where he commanded the Football Battalion), seeing action and receiving wounds to his lung and shoulder in the Battle of the Somme, and rose to the rank of major. On his return, he was appointed manager of Norwich City. The Canaries had been so debt-ridden that the receivers had wound the club up, but following an extraordinary general meeting, the club was resurrected; Buckley was placed in charge in February 1919, and returned the club to Southern League football. Despite having retired from playing during the war, he played one game for Norwich in September 1919, when he was the club's secretary-manager.

Once again, his stay was short; by July 1920 he was gone, financial disputes precipitating a wholesale change of personnel.

=== Blackpool ===
He returned to football management with Blackpool on 6 October 1923; there, his ideas began to come to the fore. He was lured to Bloomfield Road with the promise of an extremely high salary and enough money to strengthen the squad. Buckley is credited with implementing a youth system and scouting scheme to 'the Seasiders'.

Despite a total change of tactics, he did not have much more success with Blackpool than did his predecessor, Bill Norman. During the 1924–25 season Buckley sold established players such as Herbert Jones and Harry Bedford, which proved unpopular amongst the fans.

As of 2013, Buckley was the eighth-longest serving Blackpool manager in terms of Football League games in charge.

=== Wolverhampton Wanderers ===
In July 1927, he took up an appointment with Wolverhampton Wanderers. Stan Cullis wrote of him: "I soon realised that Major Buckley was one out of the top drawer. He did not suffer fools gladly. His style of management in football was very similar to his attitude in the army. Major Buckley implanted into my mind the direct method of playing which did away with close interpassing and square-ball play. If you didn't like his style you'd very soon be on your bicycle to another club. He didn't like defenders over-elaborating in their defensive positions. Major Buckley also knew how to deal with the press." (Quoted in Taylor and Ward, 1995, pp. 31–2)

Buckley's stay at Wolves can be looked at in two ways. On the face of it, he appeared to achieve only modest success with the club; they won the Division Two title in 1931–32 and finished runners-up in the Division One in 1937–38 and in both the First Division and the FA Cup the following season. An alternative view is that during his stay at Molineux, Buckley once made the club a £100,000 profit within one year, purely on transfer deals; he toyed, provocatively, with the media, instigating the empty rumour that his players were using a monkey gland treatment (see Serge Voronoff) to aid performance; he used psychologists to instill confidence in his players and was responsible for bringing through Stan Cullis and offering Billy Wright a start in professional football. After he had left the club, however, the full value of his vision, not least the Wolves youth programme, came to fruition and did so much to shape the Wolves side of the 1950s, when they won three Division One championships, twice won the FA Cup, and were one of few genuine challengers to the Busby Babes.

Buckley left Wolves in 1944 and another non-committal couple of years followed at Notts County (for a then-unheard-of £4,000 a year) and Hull City before starting work at Leeds United, where one of his first discoveries was John Charles just after Christmas 1948. He was not afraid to try all manner of ideas to induce the Elland Road club out of mediocrity: dancing songs broadcast through the public address system during training days, so-called 'shooting' boxes (a contraption designed to send the ball out at different speeds and angles to players), increasing admission costs, banning players from smoking two days before a match and youth development programmes. John Charles did excel during the 1954–55 season, but the team failed to respond in kind.

=== Influence ===
Buckley's influence on the rise of the Blackpool and Wolves sides of the 1950s, of the Leeds United 'club culture' of the 1960s and 1970s should never be understated. His principles may not have been adopted directly by Matt Busby, Bill Shankly, Brian Clough and Alex Ferguson but they were innovative principles that are now quite commonplace.

A stern disciplinarian throughout his career, Buckley earned devotion and affection, not least because he was also a 'tracksuit' manager. He brought in Jack Charlton, who had this to say about him:

"Unlike the pros, we got just two weeks' holidays in the summer, and while they were away our job was to remove the weeds from the pitch and replace them with grass seed. I remember being sat out there one day with Keith Ripley, another ground staff boy, when Major Buckley came over to us. We must have looked pretty forlorn, the two of us, and to gee us up he said he'd give us five shillings for every bucket we filled with weeds. Now that was an offer we couldn't refuse. By the time we were finished, we had filled six buckets, and, cheeky bugger that I was, I marched straight up to the Major's office. And when he asked what I wanted, I told him I was there to claim my thirty bob for the weeds. He nearly blew a bloody gasket! 'Get out of here!' he bellowed. 'You're already getting paid to do that work – don't ever let me see you up here again with your buckets.'

"Yet beneath the gruff exterior, he was a kind man, as he demonstrated once when I met him. My shoes must have been a sight, for when he looked down at them, he asked me if they were the only pair I had. I nodded. The next morning, he summoned me to his office and handed me a pair of Irish brogues, the strongest, most beautiful shoes I'd ever seen. And I had them for years."

Buckley left Leeds in April 1953, moving to Walsall, but left them in September 1955.

He died in Walsall in December 1964, aged 82.
