= 1921–22 Blackpool F.C. season =

English football club season

Blackpool F.C.
1921–22 season
- Manager: Bill Norman
- Division Two: 19th
- FA Cup: First round
- Top goalscorer: League: Harry Bedford (11); All: Harry Bedford (12)
Home colours

The 1921–22 season was Blackpool F.C.'s 21st season (eighteenth consecutive) in the Football League. They competed in the 22-team Division Two, then the second tier of English football, finishing nineteenth.

Harry Bedford was the club's top scorer, with twelve goals (eleven in the league and one in the FA Cup).

== Season synopsis ==
An opening-day victory, at home to Derby County, was the only time maximum points were achieved for the next eleven outings, a sequence that saw ten defeats and one draw. By the halfway point, Blackpool only had eleven points to their name.

A markedly-improved second half kept their heads just above water as they finished just two points above the relegation spots.

Any hope of an FA Cup run was ended in the first round by Watford.

== Table ==
Pos	Team	Pld	W	D	L	GF	GA	GAv	Pts	Promotion or relegation
17	Wolverhampton Wanderers	42	13	11	18	44	49	0.898	37	
18	Port Vale	42	14	8	20	43	57	0.754	36	
19	Blackpool	42	15	5	22	44	57	0.772	35	
20	Coventry City	42	12	10	20	51	60	0.850	34	
21	Bradford (Park Avenue) (R)	42	12	9	21	46	62	0.742	33	Relegation to the Third Division North

(R) Relegated

== Transfers ==
=== In ===
Date	Player	From	Fee

=== Out ===
Date	Player	From	Fee
