= Blackpool F.C. =

Association football club in England

Coordinates: 53°48′17″N 03°02′53″W

Blackpool
- Full name: Blackpool Football Club
- Nicknames: The Seasiders; The Tangerines
- Short name: Blackpool
- Founded: 26 July 1887 (139 years ago)
- Ground: Bloomfield Road
- Capacity: c.16,500
- Owner: Simon Sadler
- Manager: Steve Thompson (caretaker)
- League: EFL League One
- 2025–26: EFL League One, 13th of 24
- Website: blackpoolfc.co.uk
Home colours

Blackpool Football Club is a professional association football club based in the seaside resort of Blackpool, Lancashire, England. The team competes in EFL League One, the third tier of the English football league system.

Founded in 1887, the club formerly played its home games at Raikes Hall and the Athletic Grounds before moving to Bloomfield Road in 1901. Blackpool were founder members of the Lancashire League in 1889 and were invited into the Football League Second Division in 1896. They failed re-election in 1899 but had their Football League membership reinstated the following year. From 1923 onwards, Blackpool have worn the tangerine shade of orange shirts, traditionally accompanied by white shorts and tangerine socks.

Blackpool remained in the Second Division until they won the league title in 1929–30, though they were relegated after three seasons in the First Division. Promoted again in 1936–37, the club entered a golden period under the stewardship of long-time manager Joe Smith. Blackpool lost the 1948 and 1951 FA Cup finals before winning the competition in 1953, the so-called "Matthews final", in which they beat Bolton Wanderers 4–3, overturning a 3–1 deficit in the closing stages of the game. That same year, four Blackpool players were in the England team which lost against Hungary at Wembley. In the 1950s they had four top-six finishes in the First Division, with their best position being runners-up to Manchester United in 1955–56. In 1956, Stanley Matthews was the inaugural recipient of the Ballon d'Or.

Blackpool were relegated from the First Division in 1967, and again in 1971 after winning promotion in 1969–70. They dropped into the fourth tier after suffering relegations in 1978 and 1981, then gained promotion in 1984–85. They won the 1971 Anglo-Italian Cup final, and remain the only Lancashire club to have won a European trophy.

Between 1987 and 2019, the club was owned by the Oyston family. In 1996, Owen Oyston was jailed for the rape and indecent assault of a 16-year-old girl four years earlier. His wife, Vicki, took over the chairmanship of the club during her husband's three-year prison term. The couple's son, Karl, took over in 1999 and remained in the role for nineteen years. In 2018, after the Oyston family was found, in a High Court judgement, to have operated an "illegitimate stripping" of the club, paying out £26.77 million to companies they owned, Owen relieved Karl of his role and gave it to his daughter, Natalie. In June 2019, Simon Sadler, a 49-year-old Blackpool-born businessman, bought a 96.2% share in the club, completely removing the Oyston family from any involvement.

During the long years of Oyston ownership, Blackpool were relegated to the fourth tier in 1990, promoted via the play-offs in 1992, then relegated again in 2000. Blackpool reached the Premier League in 2010, after becoming the first club to gain promotion from every division of the Football League via the play-off system; they won the 2001 Third Division play-offs, 2007 League One play-offs and the 2010 Championship play-offs. They spent one season in the Premier League, under manager Ian Holloway, and later suffered a double relegation into League Two by 2016, though gained immediate promotion by winning the 2017 League Two play-off final, their sixth success in the format in eight finals. They remained in League One for four seasons, before winning promotion, again via the play-offs, in 2021. After two seasons in the Championship, they returned to League One in 2023, where they have since remained.

== History ==
A graph displaying Blackpool's finishing positions in the Football League from 1896 to the present

=== Formation and early years (1877–1900) ===
Football had developed in Blackpool by 1877, when Victoria F.C. were founded as a church club with a ground in Caunce Street. This team disbanded a few years later but some of its members are understood to have merged with old boys from St John's School to form a new club called Blackpool St John's. The two factions remained disunited, however, and on 26 July 1887, at a meeting in the Stanley Arms public house, the members resolved to wind up St John's and form a new club to represent the whole town. It was named Blackpool Football Club.

The new club managed to win two pieces of silverware in its first season in existence, 1887–88: the Fylde Cup and the Lancashire Junior Cup.

At the conclusion of the following 1888–89 season, Blackpool became founder members of the Lancashire League. In their first season in the competition, the club finished fifth out of the 13 member clubs. They finished as runners-up over the following three seasons (to Bury twice and Liverpool once), before winning the championship themselves on their fourth attempt.

Blackpool's home at that point in time was Raikes Hall (also known as the Royal Palace Gardens), which was part of a large entertainment complex that included a theatre and a boating lake, amongst other attractions. This meant that the club's average attendances were around the 2,000 mark, making the club's formative years a financial success.

After struggling to repeat the success of the 1893–94 season, the Blackpool board decided it was time to leave local football behind, so on 13 May 1896 the club became a limited company and applied for entry to the Football League.

Their application was successful, and for the club's debut season, 1896–97, they joined the 16-team Second Division. Blackpool's first-ever Football League game took place on 5 September 1896, at Lincoln City, which they lost 3–1 in front of around 1,500 spectators.

For the 1897–98 campaign, the club played their home games at the Athletic Grounds (at the present-day Stanley Park). They remained there for the first seven home games of 1898–99, before returning to Raikes Hall for the remaining 10.

After finishing third-bottom, the club were not re-elected at the end of the 1898–99 season, and spent the 1899–1900 term back in the Lancashire League. They finished third, and after the Football League's annual meeting, on 25 May 1900, were permitted back into Division Two. It was during this season out of the League that Blackpool amalgamated with local rivals South Shore and moved to Bloomfield Road.

=== Early 20th century (1900–1946) ===
During the 10 seasons that followed, Blackpool could finish no higher than 12th place. The club's top goalscorers in the league included Bob Birket (10 goals in 1900–01), Geordie Anderson (12 goals in 1901–02) and Bob Whittingham (13 in 1908–09).

At the end of 1910–11, the club found themselves in seventh place, thanks largely to Joe Clennell's haul of 18 goals.

It was a case of "as you were", however, for the four seasons leading up to the First World War, with finishing positions of 14th, 20th, 16th and 10th. For the last of those seasons, Joe Lane netted 28 goals.

The outbreak of war forced the cancellation of League football for four years, during which time regional competitions were introduced. When normality resumed, in 1919–20, Blackpool had appointed their first full-time manager in the form of Bill Norman. Norman guided the club to fourth-placed finishes in his first two league seasons in charge (he was installed as manager during the final inter-war season), with Lane again netting close to 30 goals in the former.

The club's form nosedived in the 1921–22 season, with a finishing position of 19th, before bouncing back to a fifth-placed finish the following campaign. Harry Bedford, who had joined the club from Nottingham Forest, was the country's top league scorer, with 32 goals to his name.

Bedford repeated the feat the following season, this time under the watchful eye of new manager Frank Buckley, who replaced Bill Norman after his four years of service. Blackpool finished fourth in Buckley's first season in charge.

The 1924–25 season was not as successful; a 17th-placed finish tempered only slightly by the club's reaching the fourth round of the FA Cup for the first time. A single-goal defeat at fellow Lancastrians Blackburn Rovers ended the Seasiders' run.

Buckley guided Blackpool to top-10 finishes in his final two seasons as manager – with Billy Tremelling's 30 goals in the latter helping considerably – before he left to take the helm at Wolverhampton Wanderers.

Buckley's replacement was Sydney Beaumont, who took charge for the 1927–28 season, but he lasted only until the spring after the club finished in 19th position.

Harry Evans was installed as the new Blackpool manager, in an honorary capacity, for the 1928–29 campaign. Due in no small part to Jimmy Hampson's 40 goals, the club finished eighth. In his second season, Evans guided Blackpool to the Division Two championship (their only championship to date), finishing ahead of promotion rivals Chelsea and Oldham Athletic by three and four points respectively. Hampson had bagged 45 of the club's 98 league goals.

Blackpool lasted only three seasons in the First Division. Two third-bottom finishes were followed by a last-placed finish, and the club returned to the Second Division.

The club's relegation prompted the Blackpool board to install a recognised manager, and they opted for Sandy MacFarlane. MacFarlane occupied the Bloomfield Road hot seat for just two seasons, in which the club finished 11th and fourth. MacFarlane's final season, 1934–35, marked Jimmy Hampson's eighth successive (and final) season as Blackpool's top League goalscorer.

Joe Smith was appointed Blackpool's sixth manager in August 1935, a role in which he remained for the next 23 years.

The club finished 10th in Smith's first season, with Bobby Finan taking over from Hampson as top scorer, with 34 goals. It was Smith's second season in charge, however, that marked the starting point of the success to come. Blackpool finished the 1936–37 season as runners-up in the Second Division to Leicester City and were promoted back to the First Division.

Two seasons of Division One football were played before the Second World War intervened. Blackpool sat atop the table at the time the abandonment occurred. Regional competitions were implemented again between 1939 and 1945. For the 1945–46 season, after the war's conclusion, Blackpool spent one season in the Football League North.

=== Post-Second World War (1946–1967) ===
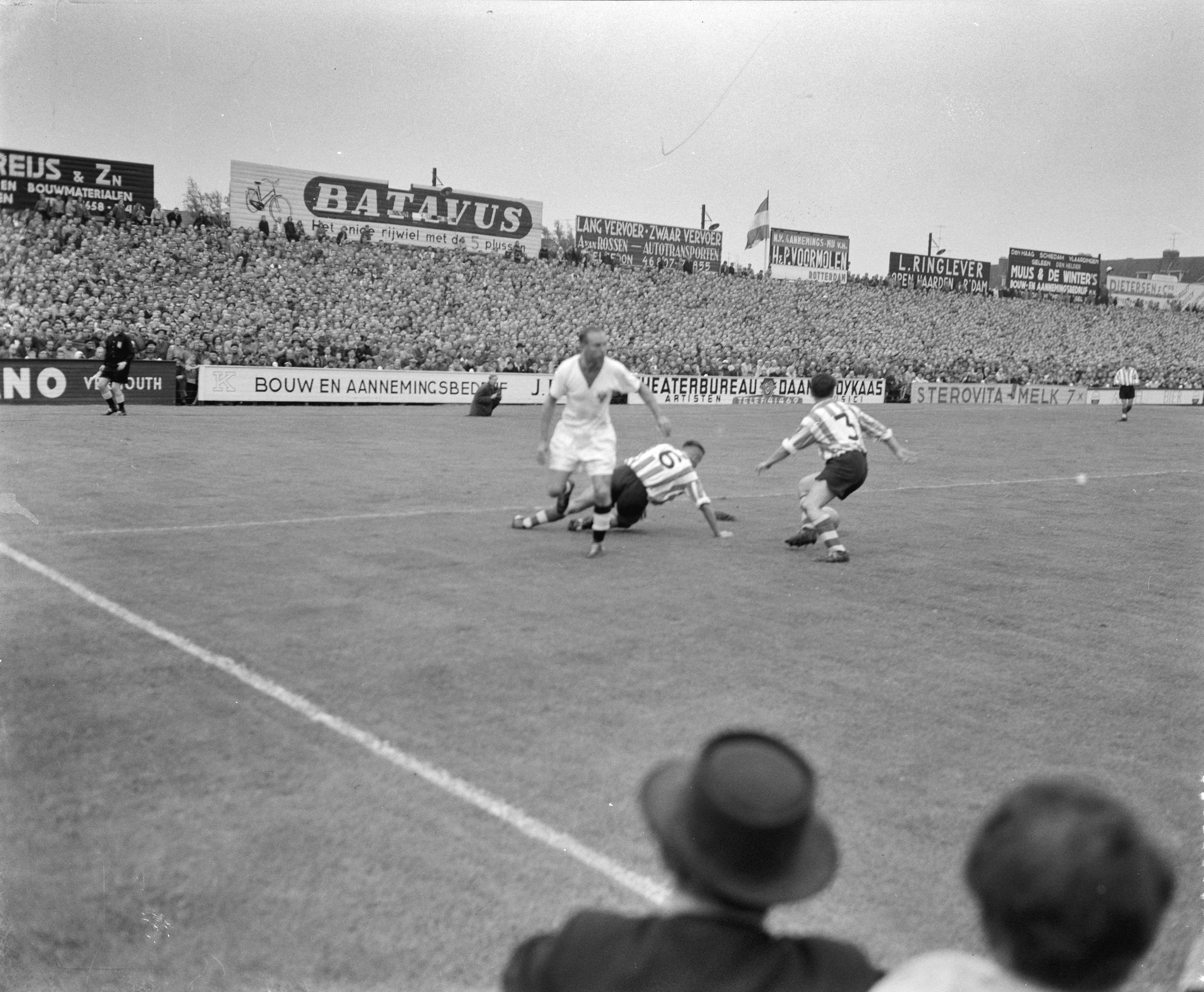
Sparta Rotterdam vs. Blackpool, August 1957

Scottish defender Hugh Kelly had arrived at Blackpool in 1943, as had fellow defender Tommy Garrett in 1942. Forward Stan Mortensen joined the club after the war in 1946. Mortensen went on to become Blackpool's top League goalscorer for the next nine seasons, sharing the honour with Allan Brown in 1952–53. Stanley Matthews, who became a regular source of goals for Mortensen, joined Blackpool in 1947, as did centre-forward Jackie Mudie. Goalkeeper George Farm signed in 1948, followed by outside-left Bill Perry in 1949. Kelly, Garrett, Matthews, Mudie, Farm and Perry would play with the club throughout the 1950s, the most successful decade in the club's history.

Post-war Blackpool reached the FA Cup final on three occasions, losing to Manchester United in 1948 and Newcastle United three years later, and winning it in 1953, captained by Harry Johnston.

For the first and only time in the club's history, four Blackpool players (Johnston, Matthews, Mortensen and debutant Ernie Taylor) represented England in the infamous 6–3 defeat by Hungary at Wembley on 25 November 1953. Of the four, only Matthews would ever represent his country again.

In 1955–56, and now captained by Kelly, Blackpool attained their highest-ever finish in the Football League: runners-up to Manchester United, despite losing their final four league games. It was a feat that could not be matched or bettered over the following two seasons, with fourth and seventh-placed finishes, and Smith left Blackpool as the club's most successful and longest-serving manager.

Smith was succeeded, in May 1958, by Ron Suart, the first former Tangerine to return to the club as manager. In his first season, he led the club to eighth in the First Division and the sixth round of the FA Cup. A 23-year-old Ray Charnley topped the club's goalscoring chart with 20, in his first season as a professional, and went on to repeat the feat for seven of the eight seasons that followed.

The League Cup came into existence in 1960–61. Blackpool were knocked out in the second round, the round in which they entered. The club's First Division status came under threat, but they managed to avoid relegation by one point, at the expense of Newcastle United. Local arch-rivals Preston North End were the other club to make the drop.

In October 1961, Matthews, now aged 46, was sold back to Stoke City. Mid-table finishes in 1961–62 and 1962–63 (and an appearance in the League Cup semi-finals during the former) were offset by another lowly finish of 18th in 1963–64, with Alan Ball top-scoring with 13 goals. Much of the same ensued over the following two seasons, before relegation finally occurred in 1966–67. Blackpool finished bottom of the table, eight points adrift of fellow demotion victims Aston Villa. Suart had resigned four months before the end of the season. His replacement was another former Blackpool player, Stan Mortensen.

=== Late 20th century (1967–2000) ===
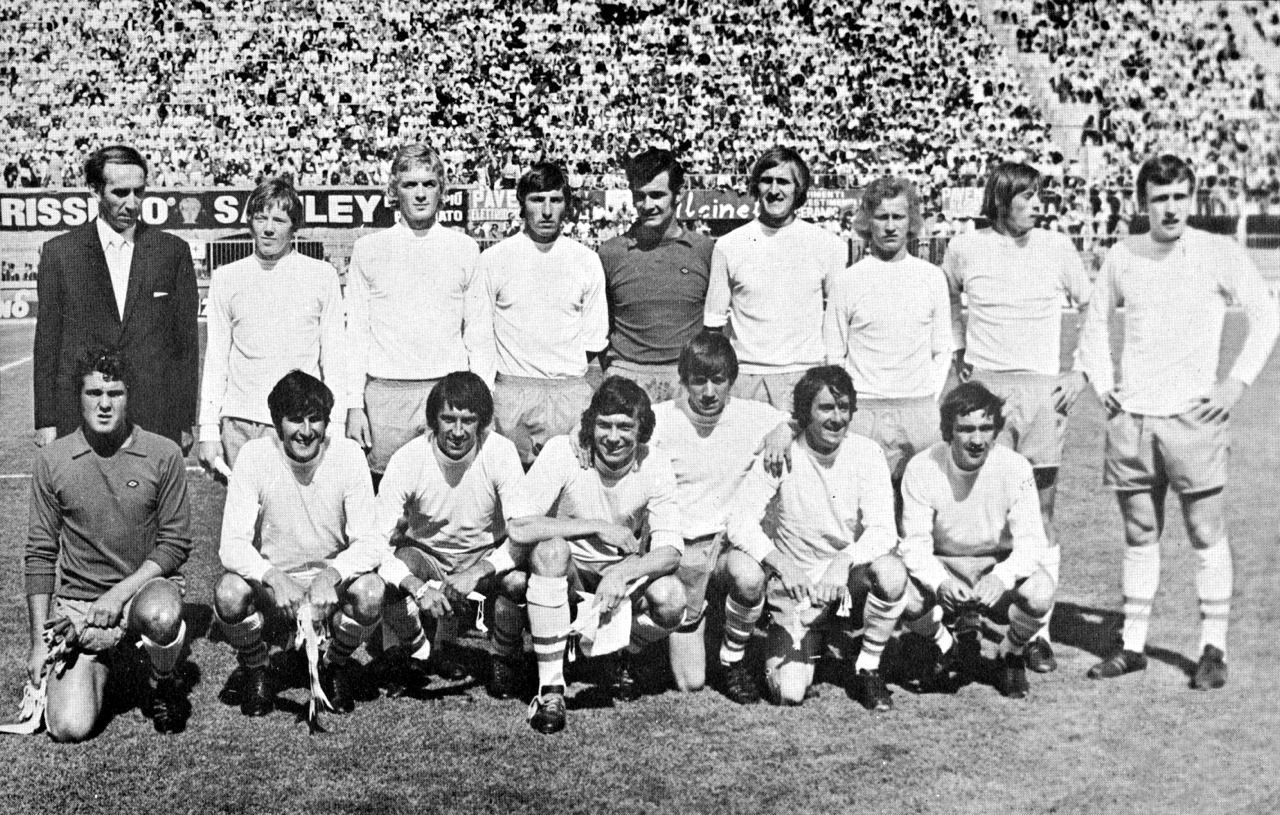
1971 Anglo-Italian Cup winners Blackpool F.C.

Mortensen picked up the pieces for the club's first season back in the Second Division in 30 years, guiding them to a third-placed finish. They had gone into the final game of the season at Huddersfield Town knowing that a win would likely secure a return to the First Division. They won 3–1, but once the premature celebrations had ended, they discovered that their nearest rivals, Queens Park Rangers, had scored a last-minute winner at Aston Villa. Q.P.R. were promoted by virtue of a better goal-average: 1.86, to Blackpool's 1.65.

At the end of the following 1968–69 campaign, the Blackpool board made the decision to sack Mortensen after just over two years in the job. Their decision was met by fans with shock and anger, as Mortensen was as popular a manager as he was a player.

Les Shannon, who spent the majority of his playing career with Blackpool's Lancashire rivals Burnley, was installed as manager for the 1969–70 season. In his first season, he succeeded where Mortensen had failed, by guiding the club back to the top flight as runners-up behind Huddersfield Town. Their promotion had been sealed after the penultimate game of the season, a 3–0 victory at rivals Preston North End, courtesy of a Fred Pickering hat-trick. The result effectively relegated the hosts to the Third Division.

As quickly as Shannon had taken Blackpool up, he saw them return whence they came. The club finished at the foot of the table and were relegated back to Division Two, along with Burnley. Before the season's conclusion, Shannon was briefly replaced by Jimmy Meadows as caretaker manager, who in turn was permanently replaced by Bob Stokoe. On 12 June 1971, well over a month after the conclusion of the League season, Blackpool won the Anglo-Italian Cup with a 2–1 victory over Bologna in the final. This was achieved without the services of Jimmy Armfield, who retired in May after 17 years and 627 appearances for the club.

Blackpool finished amongst the top 10 teams in the Second Division for six consecutive seasons, under three different managers: Stokoe, Harry Potts and Allan Brown. Twice Blackpool narrowly missed promotion to Division One, by two points in 1974 and 1977.

In February 1978, midway through 1977–78, Brown's second season at the helm, Blackpool were seventh in the division. Having just beaten local rivals Blackburn Rovers 5–2, on 6 February 1978, Brown was sacked by chairman Billy Cartmell for personal reasons. The team won only one more game that season, which ended with their relegation to the Division Three for the first time in their history.

On 1 April 1978, with six games to go, Blackpool were in eighth place, nine points off the third relegation slot. On 25 April, with one game to go, Blackpool were 14th, three points above Cardiff City in the third relegation slot. Four days later, Blackpool completed their programme and were 16th with 37 points – two points clear of Leyton Orient in the third relegation slot, with a vastly superior goal difference (−1, which was four better than fifth-placed Blackburn Rovers). At that point, all the teams below Blackpool still had games to play, apart from bottom placed Hull City. The bottom of the Division Two table read:

| Position | Team | Played | Points |
|---|---|---|---|
| 16 | Blackpool | 42 | 37 |
| 17 | Charlton Athletic | 41 | 37 |
| 18 | Millwall | 41 | 36 |
| 19 | Cardiff City | 40 | 36 |
| 20 | Leyton Orient | 40 | 35 |
| 21 | Mansfield Town | 41 | 31 |
| 22 | Hull City | 42 | 28 |

The only other team in the division with games to play was Notts County, in 14th place with 38 points.

After Millwall achieved safety by beating already relegated Mansfield Town, the three remaining fixtures were Cardiff City v. Notts County, Leyton Orient v. Charlton Athletic, and Cardiff City v. Leyton Orient. Only one combination from the 27 possible outcomes of those three games would have resulted in all three teams getting more than 37 points and Blackpool being relegated. Inevitably, Cardiff City beat Notts County, Leyton Orient drew with Charlton and, in the final match, Leyton Orient, who up to that point had only won one away game all season, and had lost six out of their previous eight away games, with no wins, beat now-safe Cardiff City, who had lost only two home games all season and had won six out of their previous seven homes games, with no defeats. Blackpool were relegated with 37 points (the seven teams above them all having 38 ), and were not to return to the second tier for 29 years:

| Position | Team | Played | Points |
|---|---|---|---|
| 16 | Millwall | 42 | 38 |
| 17 | Charlton Athletic | 42 | 38 |
| 18 | Bristol Rovers | 42 | 38 |
| 19 | Cardiff City | 42 | 38 |
| 20 | Blackpool | 42 | 37 |
| 21 | Mansfield Town | 42 | 31 |
| 22 | Hull City | 42 | 28 |

Bob Stokoe returned for a second stint as manager for the 1978–79 campaign, at the end of which Blackpool finished mid-table. Stokoe resigned during the summer.

Stan Ternent became Blackpool's seventh manager in nine years, only to be replaced in February 1980 by Alan Ball, the popular former Blackpool midfielder who left the club for Everton 14 years earlier. Ball himself only lasted a year in the job, and departed when the club were relegated to the League's basement division.

Allan Brown had taken over from Ball in February 1981, and he remained in charge for the following 1981–82 term. Blackpool finished twelfth in their first season in Division Four; however, unable to handle the pressure of the job, Brown resigned during the close season.

Sam Ellis took over from Brown in June 1982, three years after he finished his playing career with Watford. His first season saw Blackpool finish 21st, with Dave Bamber topping the club's goalscoring chart for the second consecutive season with 10 strikes.

It was Ellis's third season, however, that brought the success the club had been looking for. Blackpool finished second behind Chesterfield and were back in Division Three.

The club managed to finish in the top half of the table for their first three seasons in the Third Division, but slipped to 19th in Ellis's seventh and final season in charge.

On 17 April 1986, the board of directors put the club on the market after councillors rejected plans to sell Bloomfield Road for a supermarket site in a £35 million redevelopment scheme. The club was then sold to Owen Oyston for £1.

For the 1989–90 season, Blackpool appointed Jimmy Mullen as manager. Mullen's reign last only 11 months, however, and he left the club after their relegation back to Division Four.

Graham Carr replaced Mullen, but his spell in the manager's seat was even shorter – just four months. He was sacked in November 1990 with Blackpool in 18th place.

Carr's replacement was his assistant, Billy Ayre. Ayre guided the team to a fifth-placed finish and qualification for the play-offs. They lost only five of their 30 league games that remained at the time of Ayre's appointment. The run included 13 consecutive home league wins in an eventual 24–game unbeaten run at Bloomfield Road. The run was extended to 15 consecutive home wins at the start of the 1991–92 campaign, which remains the club record.

After beating Scunthorpe United in the two-legged semi-finals of the play-offs, Blackpool lost to Torquay United in the Wembley final, on penalties after the score was tied 2–2 after regular and extra time.

The following 1991–92 season finished with Blackpool in fourth place, missing out on automatic promotion by one point, which meant another play-offs experience. This time they met Barnet in the semi-finals and won 2–1 on aggregate. They returned to Wembley, where they faced Scunthorpe United in the final, the team they knocked out of the play-offs 12 months earlier. Again the score was tied at the end of regular and extra time, but Blackpool were victorious in the penalty shootout and booked their place in the new Division Two.

Blackpool struggled in their first term back in the third tier of English football but pulled to safety in 18th place by the end. In late 1993 they were as high as fourth but tumbled down the table in the second half of that season to miss the drop by a whisker in 20th, avoiding relegation by virtue of a 4–1 victory over Leyton Orient on the final day of the season. Ayre was sacked in the summer of 1994 and was replaced by Sam Allardyce.

Allardyce led Blackpool to a mid-table finish in his first season and saw the club knocked out of both cup competitions at the first hurdle. Tony Ellis was the club's top scorer with 17 league goals.

The 1995–96 season saw Blackpool finish third and claim a place in the play-offs for the third time in six seasons. In the semi-finals, Blackpool travelled to Bradford City and won 2–0. Three days later, they hosted the Yorkshiremen at Bloomfield Road and lost 3–0. Blackpool remained in Division Two, and Allardyce was sacked not long afterwards.

In 1996, owner Oyston was convicted of the rape of a 16-year-old girl. Former Norwich City manager Gary Megson replaced Allardyce, and attained a seventh-placed finish in his only season in charge. Nigel Worthington succeeded Megson in the summer of 1997, and in the Northern Irishman's two full campaigns in the hot seat, Blackpool finished 12th and 14th. Worthington resigned towards the end of the 1999–2000 season, and his seat was filled by the former Liverpool and England midfielder Steve McMahon.

=== Rise to the Premier League (2001–2010) ===
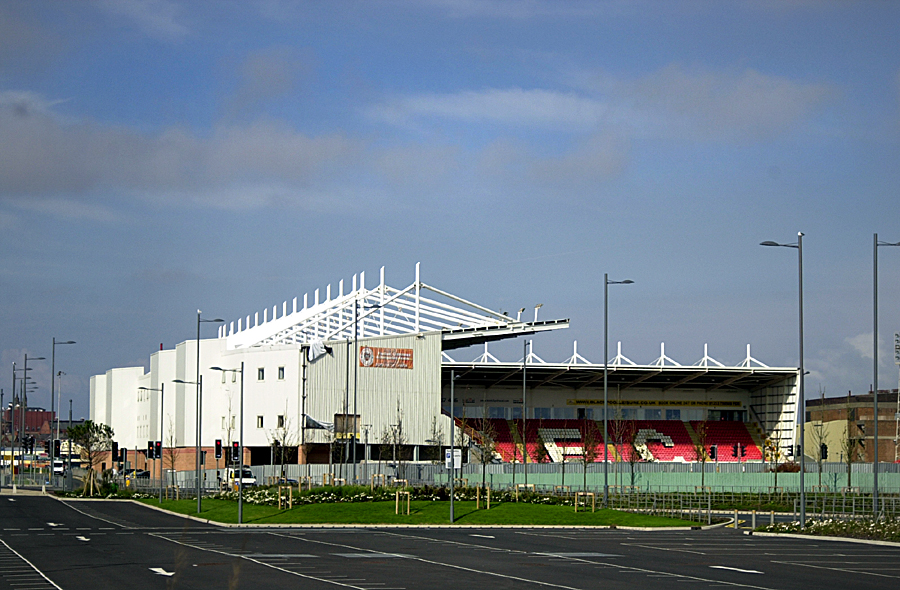
Bloomfield Road, Blackpool's home since 1899, during its reconstruction phase in the early part of the 21st century. This view is looking north

McMahon arrived too late to save the club from relegation to the Third Division (fourth tier) after a 22nd-placed finish in the table. In his first full season in charge, Blackpool were promoted to Division Two by winning the play-offs. The following season the club received its then record outgoing transfer fee; £1.75million from Southampton for Brett Ormerod, eclipsing the £600,000 QPR paid for Trevor Sinclair eight years earlier. They also gained the first of two Football League Trophy wins in 2002 as Blackpool beat Cambridge United 4–1 at the Millennium Stadium. Their second win was in 2004, this time beating Southend United 2–0 again in Cardiff. In the summer following the Trophy win, McMahon resigned, believing he could not take the club any further with the budget he was being offered. Colin Hendry became the new manager, but was replaced by Simon Grayson in November 2005 after an unsuccessful stint which left Blackpool languishing just above the relegation zone of League One (third tier).

In the 2006–07 FA Cup Blackpool reached the fourth round for the first time in 17 years, after beating Aldershot Town 4–2 at Bloomfield Road, but were knocked out by Norwich City, 3–2 after a replay at Carrow Road. They finished in third place, and qualified for the play-offs, and as top scorers in League One with 76 goals. After beating Oldham Athletic 5–2 on aggregate in the semi-final they met Yeovil Town in the final at the new Wembley Stadium, their first appearance at England's national stadium in 15 years. Blackpool won 2–0, a club-record 10th consecutive victory, and were promoted to the Championship in their 100th overall season in the Football League. The promotion marked their return to English football's second tier for the first time in 29 years.

Blackpool knocked Premier League side Derby County out of the League Cup at the second-round stage on 28 August 2007. The match ended 1–1 after 90 minutes and 2–2 after extra time. The Seasiders won the resulting penalty shootout 7–6. On 25 September, Blackpool beat Southend United 2–1 after extra time to reach the fourth round for the first time in 35 years. They were drawn away to Premiership side Tottenham Hotspur in the last 16, a match they lost 2–0. Tottenham went on to win the competition.

Blackpool finished the 2007–08 season in 19th place, escaping relegation by two points and ensuring their safety in a 1–1 draw with Watford on the final day of the Championship season.

On 23 December 2008, Simon Grayson left the club to join League One club Leeds United after just over three years in charge at Bloomfield Road. Under the guidance of Grayson's assistant Tony Parkes, as caretaker manager, Blackpool finished the 2008–09 campaign in 16th place. Parkes left the club on 18 May 2009 after a meeting with chairman Karl Oyston about finances.

On 21 May 2009, Ian Holloway was appointed as manager, signing a one-year contract with the club with an option of a further year. On 31 July it was announced that club president Valērijs Belokoņs was setting up a new transfer fund, into which he was adding a "considerable amount" to invest in new players identified by Holloway. Four days later Blackpool broke their transfer record by signing Charlie Adam from Scottish champions Rangers for £500,000 (equivalent to about £798,000 in 2025), topping the £275,000 paid to Millwall for Chris Malkin in 1996.

Blackpool finished the 2009–10 regular season in sixth place in the Championship, their highest finish in the Football League since 1970–71, and claimed a spot in the play-offs. On 2 May 2010, the 57th anniversary of Blackpool's FA Cup final victory, Blackpool hosted Bristol City for the final League game of the season. They needed to match or better Swansea City's result in their match at home to Doncaster Rovers. Both matches ended in draws, with Swansea's Lee Trundle having a late goal disallowed for handball, which meant Blackpool secured the remaining play-off place.

On 8 May, Blackpool beat Nottingham Forest 2–1 at Bloomfield Road in the semi-final first leg. Three days later, they beat them 4–3 (6–4 on aggregate) at the City Ground in the second leg to progress to the final against Cardiff. The result meant Blackpool had beaten Forest in all four of the clubs' meetings in 2009–10.

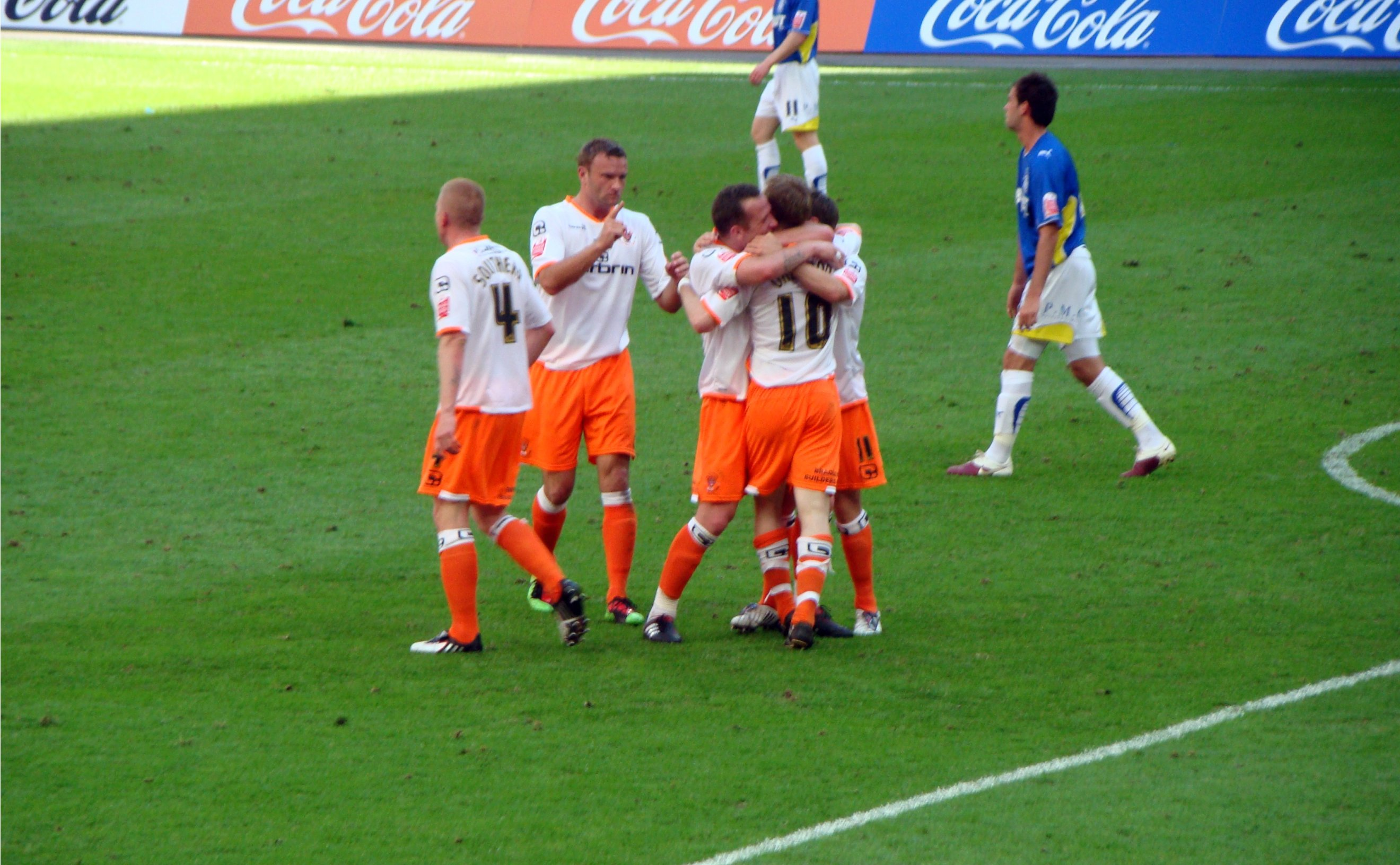
Blackpool celebrating at Wembley in 2010

Blackpool defeated Cardiff City 3–2 on 22 May in the Championship play-off final at Wembley Stadium to earn promotion to the Premier League. It was Blackpool's debut appearance in the Premier League in its 18-year existence and their first appearance in English football's top flight in 39 years. Blackpool had now, uniquely, been promoted through all three tiers of the Football League via the play-off system. Furthermore, they won all nine play-off games they were involved in during the 10 seasons between 2001 and 2010. The fixture was dubbed "the richest game in football", because the victorious club would receive a £90 million windfall. It was more than double the £36 million that the winners of the Champions League received.

On 24 May, a promotion parade was held along Blackpool's promenade for the club's personnel, who travelled on an open-top double-decker bus from Gynn Square down the Golden Mile to the Waterloo Headland. The police estimated that about 100,000 people lined the route. At the Headland, the manager and squad took to a stage to address the gathered mass crowd. "This is the most unbelievable moment of my life," said Ian Holloway. "I've jumped on the best ride of my life and I don't want to go home."

=== Premier League campaign (2010–11) ===
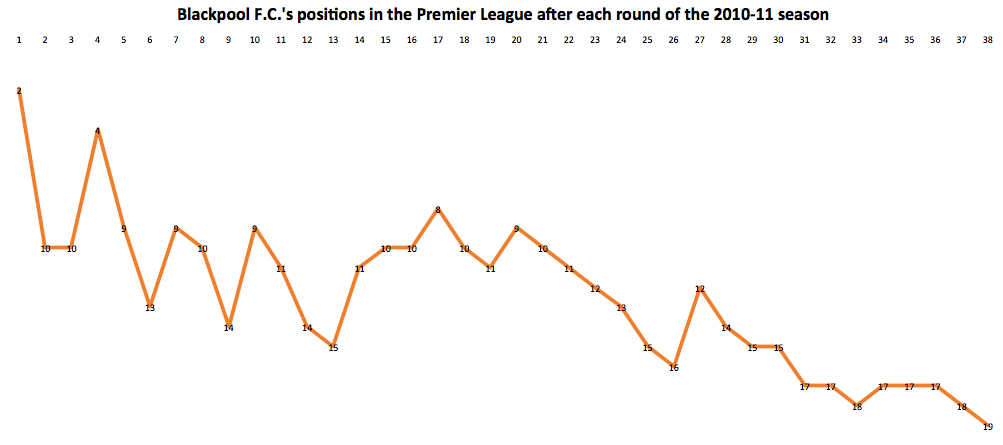
Blackpool F.C.'s positions in the Premier League after each round of the 2010–11 season

In their first-ever Premier League match on 14 August 2010, Blackpool defeated Wigan Athletic 4–0 at the DW Stadium. The result saw the Seasiders at the top of the entire English football pyramid until Chelsea's 6–0 victory over West Bromwich Albion later in the day. It was the first time they had been in such a position since they won their opening game of the 1957–58 top-flight campaign. The initial fixture list had the game being played at Bloomfield Road, but the Premier League allowed the fixture to be reversed because construction work on Bloomfield Road's East Stand had not been completed in time.

On 27 January 2011, the Premier League fined Blackpool £25,000 (equivalent to about £37,000 in 2025) for fielding what they believed to be a weakened team against Aston Villa on 10 November. Ian Holloway, who initially threatened to resign if punishment was dealt, had made 10 changes to the team for the fixture. The club had 14 days to appeal against the decision but chose not to, with Karl Oyston saying that if the punishment was upheld there was a threat of a point deduction and an increase in the fine.

On 22 May 2011, exactly 365 days after their promotion, Blackpool were relegated back to the Championship after losing 4–2 at champions Manchester United on the final day of the season, though results elsewhere also impacted the final league standings. Despite predictions that they "would not get 10 points," Blackpool took 39 from their 38 games, including home and away victories over Liverpool, consecutive away wins at Stoke City and Sunderland, and a home victory over Tottenham Hotspur. Seven of their 10 overall wins were obtained before the new year, and at the end of 2010 they sat in eighth place; however, seven defeats in the opening eight fixtures of 2011 saw them drop down the table. The next match, a draw at home Aston Villa, left them in 15th, their lowest placing of the campaign to date. Another run of defeats – this time five in six – put them in the relegation zone for the first time. They climbed out of the bottom three, at the expense of Wigan Athletic, with successive home draws against Newcastle United and Stoke City. Blackpool dropped back into the relegation zone after conceding a late equaliser to draw at Tottenham, switching places with Wolves; they were level on points with Wigan and three ahead of bottom club West Ham United. A victory, their first in three months, over Bolton Wanderers, in their penultimate league fixture, was not enough to change the position as Wolves won at Sunderland. Blackpool went to Old Trafford for the final match and were leading 2–1 12 minutes into the second half, but Manchester United, who were crowned champions a week earlier, took control and won 4–2 to condemn 19th-placed Blackpool to relegation along with Birmingham City and West Ham United.

=== Fall to the fourth tier (2011–2017) ===
In July 2011, Blackpool smashed their outgoing transfer record when Charlie Adam signed for Liverpool in a £7-million deal (equivalent to about £10M in 2025). A portion of these funds was used to bring former Scotland, Rangers, Blackburn Rovers and Birmingham captain Barry Ferguson to Bloomfield Road, where he once again assumed the armband. On 9 May 2012, Blackpool secured their place in the Championship play-off final in their second consecutive season in the division after beating Birmingham City 3–2 on aggregate in the semi-finals. They met West Ham United in the final at Wembley on 19 May, losing 2–1, conceding a last-gasp goal to the Hammers' Ricardo Vaz Tê, their first play-off final reversal in 21 years.

On 3 November 2012, Ian Holloway decided to leave Blackpool after accepting an offer from fellow Championship club Crystal Palace to be their manager. He was replaced four days later by Michael Appleton, who left League One side Portsmouth to take up the position; however, after being in charge for just two months, Appleton left for Lancashire neighbours Blackburn Rovers, becoming the shortest-serving manager in Blackpool's history. On 18 February, after just over a month without an appointment, the club made former England captain Paul Ince their third manager of the campaign. It was under Ince that the club made their best-ever start to a league season. Their victory at AFC Bournemouth on 14 September 2013 gave them 16 points out of a possible 18. The sequence of results was two wins, a draw, and three wins. This was countered by a run of nine defeats in 10 games, which resulted in Ince being sacked on 21 January 2014, 11 months into his tenure.

Barry Ferguson was named caretaker manager upon Ince's dismissal. Of Ferguson's 20 league games in charge, Blackpool won just three and finished the 2013–14 season in 20th place. On 11 June 2014, almost five months after Paul Ince's dismissal, the club appointed Belgian José Riga as manager. He was Blackpool's first overseas manager.

Prior to the start of the 2014–15 season Blackpool suffered a major crisis with some 27 players leaving the club; just two weeks before the season started, the club had only eight outfield players and no goalkeeper. Riga was able to assemble a squad in time for Blackpool's first game against Nottingham Forest, but could still only name four substitutes instead of the permitted seven. Blackpool lost the match 2–0. On 27 October 2014, after 15 games in charge, Riga was sacked and replaced by Lee Clark.

On 6 April 2015, with six league fixtures remaining, Blackpool were relegated to League One. On 2 May 2015, the final match of the Championship season against Huddersfield Town was abandoned in the 48th minute following an on-pitch protest by hundreds of Blackpool supporters regarding the actions and management style of the directors and owners. The Football League subsequently declared the result the 0–0 scoreline it was at the time of abandonment, which meant Blackpool finished the season with 26 points. Following the resignation of Lee Clark on 9 May 2015, Blackpool appointed Neil McDonald as manager on 2 June.

In May 2016, a second successive relegation occurred, which put Blackpool in the bottom tier of English professional football for the first time in 15 years. Less than two weeks later, Neil McDonald was sacked as manager. He was replaced by Gary Bowyer, the club's eighth manager in three-and-a-half years.

In late 2016, as the sexual abuse scandal developed, former Blackpool player Paul Stewart alleged he had been abused by Frank Roper, a coach associated with Blackpool in the 1980s.

In May 2017, under Bowyer, Blackpool won promotion to League One after beating Exeter City 2–1 at Wembley in the play-off final. The victory meant that Blackpool became the most successful side in English play-off history, winning their fifth final.

=== End of the Oyston era (2017–2019) ===
On 10 November 2017, Blackpool was put up for sale by the Oyston family. The sale included the club itself and the properties division that owns Bloomfield Road stadium.

On 2 February 2018, Owen Oyston relieved Karl Oyston of his role as chairman and appointed his 32-year-old daughter, Natalie Christopher, in his place, just two weeks after appointing her to the club's board.

Gary Bowyer resigned in August 2018 after two years in charge, after the first game of the season for undisclosed reasons. He was replaced with his assistant Terry McPhillips as caretaker manager. McPhillips was made the permanent manager a month later.

On 13 February 2019, the football club was put into receivership by the High Court, which forced Owen Oyston to pay ex-director Valērijs Belokoņs some of the £25m he was owed. Oyston was removed from the board of the club by the receiver on 25 February 2019. The receiver was tasked with discharging some of Oyston's assets, as well as Blackpool Football Club (Properties) Ltd, which owns the football club. The ruling could have resulted in the club being deducted 12 league points; however, this was eventually ruled against by the EFL on 11 April 2019.

=== Under new ownership (2019–present) ===
On 13 June 2019, Simon Sadler was announced as the new owner of the club, officially ending the Oystons' 32-year tenure, purchasing a 96.2% stake. Sadler was born and raised in Blackpool and has worked in asset management in Hong Kong since 2007. He is the founder and Chief Investment Officer of Segantii Capital Management.

Terry McPhillips resigned as Blackpool manager on 5 July 2019, having informed the club's board that he had no long-term desire to be a manager. He was replaced by Simon Grayson, who returned for a second spell in charge; however, after a long run of defeats, he was sacked on 12 February 2020. Grayson's last game in charge was a 3–2 home loss to Gillingham. Liverpool U23s manager Neil Critchley was appointed head coach – the first such role for the club – as his replacement on 2 March 2020. After a curtailed regular season due to the COVID-19 pandemic in the United Kingdom, Blackpool finished the 2019–20 season in 13th position after standings were amended to reflect a points-per-game ratio.

At the end of the following campaign, Blackpool were promoted back to the second tier of English football, after a six-year absence, after winning the 2021 EFL League One play-off final. It was Blackpool's sixth victory in a play-off final in eight such appearances.

The 2021–22 season saw Blackpool secure a sixteenth-place finish in the Championship. On 2 June 2022, Neil Critchley resigned from his role as head coach and joined Aston Villa as assistant head coach. Critchley told Simon Sadler he was keen to work again with Steven Gerrard and "pit himself against some of the best coaches in the world". Just over two weeks later, the club appointed its former manager Michael Appleton as Critchley's successor. Appleton was sacked seven months later, on 18 January 2023, after the club managed one win in eleven games. Veteran Mick McCarthy was appointed to oversee the rest of the season, but an Easter Monday defeat at home to fellow strugglers Cardiff City ended his spell in charge. Interim manager and former Seasiders striker Stephen Dobbie could not keep them in the division. Blackpool were relegated to League One after a home defeat to Millwall on 28 April 2023.

Neil Critchley returned for a second spell as manager in the summer, and the following 2023–24 season saw an eighth-placed finish in League One, two places outside the play-off positions. He was sacked in August 2024. On 3 September 2024, Steve Bruce was appointed as head coach.

In January 2025, it was revealed that Sadler was looking to sell the club as he faces accusations of insider trading with Segantii. After achieving a ninth-placed finish in the 2024–25 season, Bruce was sacked as head coach on 4 October 2025 with the club second-bottom of League One. Former Blackpool captain Ian Evatt was appointed as Bruce's replacement on 21 October. In November 2026, Ian Evatt is sacked after a year in charge.

== Colours ==
Blackpool first began wearing tangerine for the 1923–24 season, after a recommendation from referee Albert Hargreaves, who officiated an international match between the Netherlands and Belgium and was impressed by the Dutchmen's colours.

Before changing to tangerine permanently, the team tried several different colours: blue-and-white striped shirts in the 1890s (becoming known as the Merry Stripes); a mixture of red or white shirts at the turn of the 20th century; and, during the First World War, black, yellow and red. The latter was adopted to include the colours of the flag of Belgium, a show of support for the large number of Belgian refugees that had arrived in the town. After the war, they wore white shirts and navy-blue shorts. The board introduced another change in 1934 when the team appeared in alternating dark- and light-blue stripes (which have been reintroduced several times in the mid-1990s and 2002, for Blackpool's return to the top flight in 2010 as the club's third kit, and as their away kit in 2019–20), but they bowed to public pressure in 1939 and settled on tangerine. Between 1938 and 1958 Blackpool's kit consisted of tangerine shirts, white shorts and navy blue socks. The club now uses tangerine socks, though navy was used as a secondary colour in the late 1980s and early 1990s.

== Stadium ==
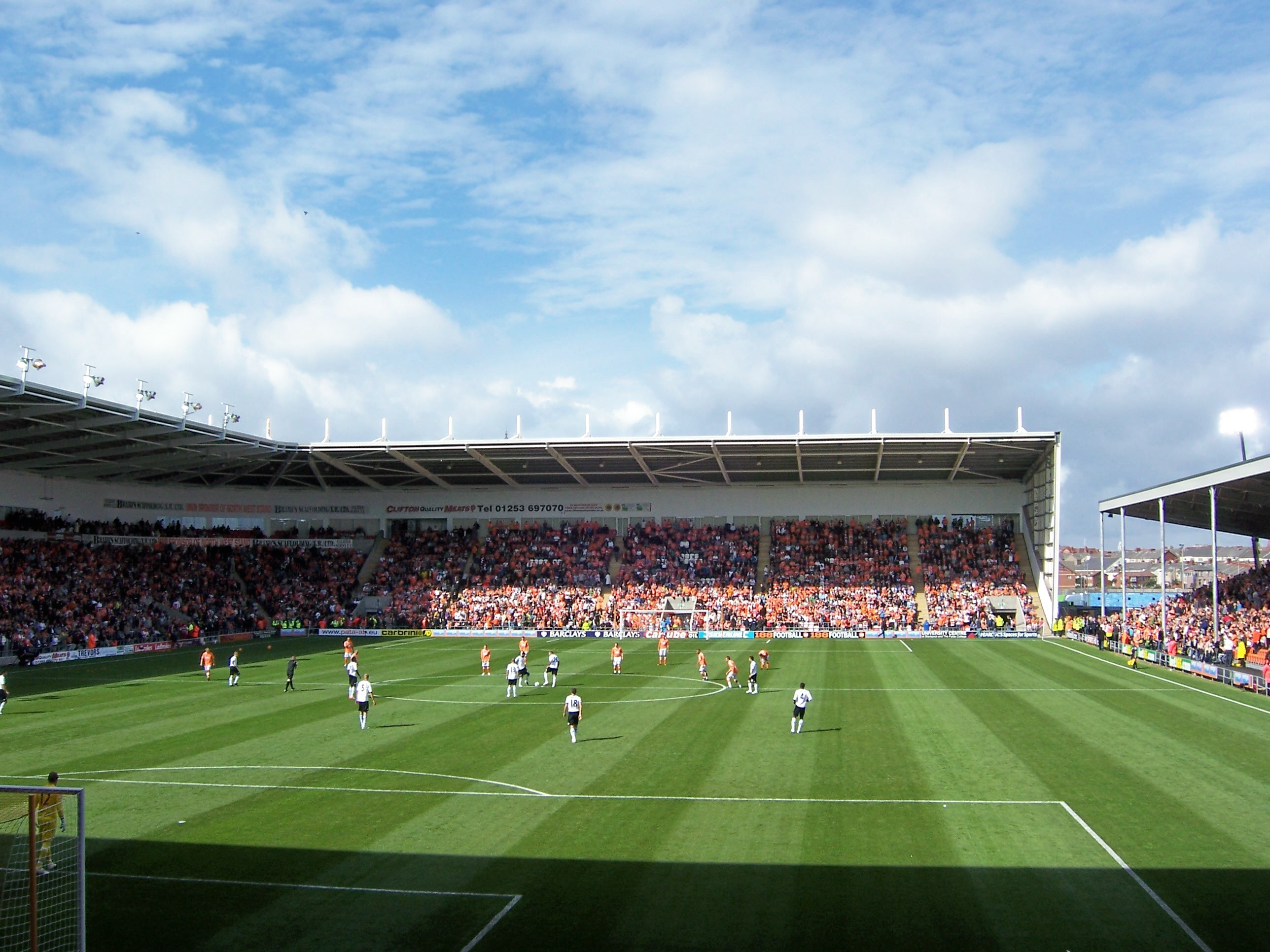
Bloomfield Road, looking north, during a Premier League game against Fulham in 2010

Blackpool have played their home games at Bloomfield Road since 1901. As of April 2025, Blackpool F.C.'s official website states that Bloomfield Road has a capacity of "just under 16,500".

In the summer of 2010, work was done on the stadium to prepare for the club's debut season in the Premier League. A new 5,120-capacity temporary East Stand was built, together with improvements to the floodlighting, media and medical facilities and the dugouts. Painting work was also done on the Stanley Matthews (West) Stand and the Mortensen Kop (North Stand). A new video screen was also installed. A new South Stand named after Jimmy Armfield was opened in 2010 with 3,600 seats. From the first home game in the Premier League, against Fulham on 28 August 2010, the capacity was 16,220, the highest at Bloomfield Road in 30 years.

In the 2011–12 season, the south east corner between the Armfield Stand and the temporary East Stand was filled with an additional 500 seats, the area also incorporating the BFC Hotel, which welcomed its first guests at the end of June 2012. It was officially opened on 26 July 2012, the club's 125th anniversary. The hotel has a four-star rating, although the source of the accreditation is not specified on its website. It also houses a conference centre. From the 2015–16 season to Blackpool's homecoming game against Southend United, the East Stand had been closed to fans. In the latter part of the 2018–19 EFL League One season, away fans moved to the North-East Stand. As of the 2019–20 season, away fans are now accommodated in the East Stand.

== Supporters ==
Blackpool supporters are known by the general terms Tangerine Army or Seaside Barmy Army. Whilst Blackpool had the lowest average home attendance in the Premier League, the atmosphere generated by the home support was regarded as loud and intimidating.

After Steve McMahon resigned as Blackpool manager in 2004, he said of the Tangerine support: "During my time here, the supporters have been fantastic and are a credit to the club. Whilst they have that support, I am sure they can go a long way. I think both on and off the pitch the club is going forward in a big way and unfortunately I'm not part of that anymore." The club was promoted three years later to the Championship, and again in 2010 to the Premier League for the 2010–11 season.

In September 2009, freelance journalist Mike Whalley said after attending a game against Peterborough United: "The home fans certainly make plenty of noise. Bloomfield Road does not lack for atmosphere. Or a drummer. Every home game is played to a thumping drum beat." After Blackpool beat Newcastle United 2–1 on 16 September 2009, Scott Wilson of the Northern Echo wrote: "Almost 10,000 spectators created a hostile and intimidating atmosphere that was a throwback to footballing days gone by" while the Sky Sports match report described the Blackpool support as "boisterous".

On 28 August 2010 Blackpool played Fulham in their first-ever home Premier League game, in front of a crowd of 15,529, the largest attendance for over 30 years at Bloomfield Road. On Sky Sports' Football First programme, co-commentator Barry Horne said: "They are a fantastic crowd. I've watched a lot of Championship games here and the crowd have always been brilliant; they get behind their team." Commentator Will Cope later said: "It's deafening; deafening by the seaside. You wouldn't have thought 15,000 fans could make so much noise." After the game Fulham manager Mark Hughes also praised the home support saying that the atmosphere in the stadium would really help the team in their debut season in the Premier League.

During the 2010–11 Premier League campaign, a decibel-metre was set up three times at each stadium, and an average then taken to indicate the loudest supporters. Despite having a capacity of 16,220, the Blackpool support was ranked the fifth-loudest, at 85 decibels.

In January 2013, a supporters' group named SISA (Seasiders Independent Supporters Association) was formed. It folded in July the following year to become Blackpool Supporters Trust.

Blackpool Fans' Progress Group, a supporters' liaison group, was founded in 2015.

=== Rivalries ===
Blackpool's primary rival is Preston North End, and matches between the two clubs are known as the West Lancashire derby.

Since 2012–13, a Fylde Coast derby has developed with Fleetwood Town.

According to a survey conducted in 2019, Blackpool's other significant rivalries are with Bolton Wanderers, Burnley and Blackburn Rovers.

== Sponsors ==
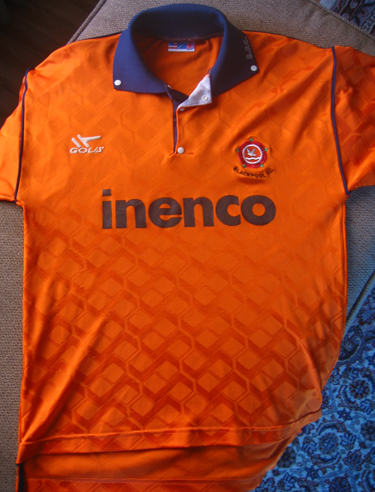
Lytham St Annes-based energy-conservation company Inenco sponsored Blackpool for three seasons in the early 1990s

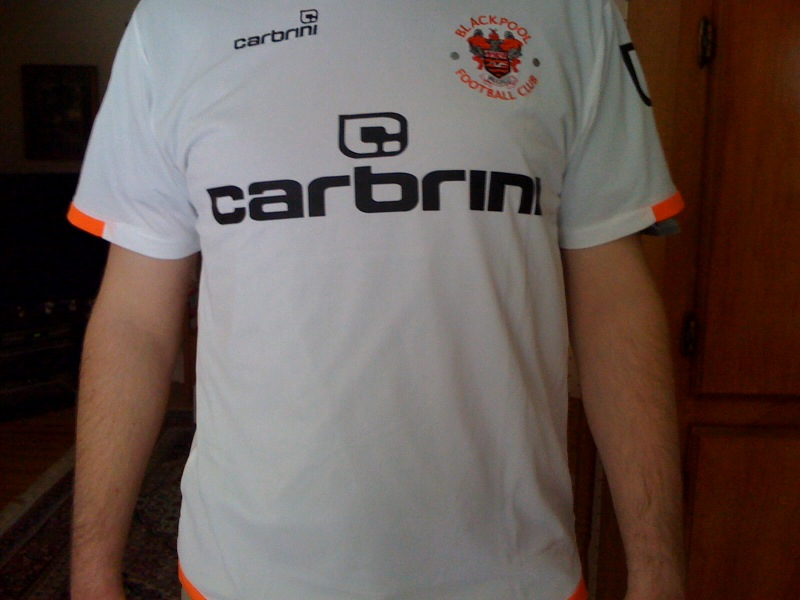
Blackpool's away shirt for the 2009–10 campaign

| Period | Kit manufacturer | Shirt sponsor |
|---|---|---|
| 1974–1979 | Umbro | None |
| 1979–1981 | Umbro | Easywear |
| 1981–1982 | Umbro | None |
| 1982–1983 | Umbro | Pembroke Hotel |
| 1983–1984 | Hobott | None |
| 1984–1985 | Umbro | JK Brown |
| 1986–1987 | Scoreline | Harry Feeney Autos |
| 1987–1988 | Lowfields | Harry Feeney Autos |
| 1988–1989 | Scoreline | Bass |
| 1989–1990 | None | Bass |
| 1990–1991 | None | Vaux |
| 1991 August–1991 October | Gola | None |
| 1991 October–1993 | Gola | Inenco |
| 1993–1994 | Pelada | Inenco |
| 1994–1997 | Pelada | Rebecca's Jewellers of Southport |
| 1997–1999 | Lotto | Telewest |
| 1999–2001 | Super League | Telewest |
| 2001–2003 | TFG Sport | Electricity Direct |
| 2003–2004 | Sporta | Life Repair Group |
| 2004–2005 | Sporta | Pricebusters |
| 2005–2007 | Uhlsport | Pointbetgames.com (home and away)^{1} Kimmel Lager (third) |
| 2007–2008 | Carlotti | Floors-2-Go^{2} |
| 2008–2009 | Carlotti | Carbrini |
| 2009–2010 | Carbrini | Carbrini |
| 2010–2011 | Carbrini | Wonga.com |
| 2011–2013 | Fila | Wonga.com |
| 2013–2015 | Erreà | Wonga.com |
| 2015–2016 | Erreà | Village |
| 2016–2018 | Erreà | tp. |
| 2018–2019 | Erreà | BetSid |
| 2019–2020 | Erreà | Blackpool Council ("VisitBlackpool.com" on home kits; "GET VOCAL" on away kits) |
| 2020–2022 | Puma | VisitBlackpool.com (home kit); Utility Team (away kit); Get Vocal (third kit)^{3} |
| 2022–2023 | Puma | Utilita |
| 2023–2024 | Puma | LeoVegas; Utilita (back-of-shirt) |
| 2024– | Puma | TreadTracker.com (home kit); Pleasure Beach (away kit) Pleasure Beach (third kit) |

^{1} Derek Woodman BMW sponsored the club's home shorts, while Derek Woodman Mini sponsored their away versions

^{2} Blackpool Leisure were the shorts sponsors

^{3} Tower Insurance were the shorts sponsors

Between the 2005–06 season and the 2009–10 season, Glyn Jones Estate Agents appeared in the back of their home shirts, while JMB Properties Ltd. appeared on the back of their away shirts. For the 2020–21 season, FTS became the back-of-shirt sponsor.

== Players ==
=== First-team squad ===
As of 12 October 2026

Note: EFL clubs are limited to a squad of 22 senior players (aged 21 or over). There is no limit to the number of players who were aged 20 or younger on 1 January 2025, that the club can use.

Note: Flags indicate national team as defined under FIFA eligibility rules; some limited exceptions apply. Players may hold more than one non-FIFA nationality.

| No. | Pos. | Nation | Player |
|---|---|---|---|
| 1 | GK | NIR | Bailey Peacock-Farrell |
| 2 | DF | IRL | Andy Lyons |
| 3 | DF | WAL | Zac Ashworth |
| 4 | DF | ENG | Oliver Casey |
| 5 | DF | ENG | Fraser Horsfall |
| 6 | MF | ENG | Jordan Brown |
| 7 | MF | ENG | Leighton Clarkson |
| 8 | MF | ENG | Albie Morgan |
| 9 | FW | ENG | Niall Ennis |
| 10 | MF | ENG | George Honeyman (captain) |
| 11 | MF | ENG | Josh Bowler |
| 12 | FW | ENG | Jerry Yates (on loan from Luton Town) |
| 14 | FW | ENG | Tom Bloxham |
| 15 | DF | ENG | Hayden Coulson |
| 17 | MF | JAM | Karoy Anderson |

| No. | Pos. | Nation | Player |
|---|---|---|---|
| 18 | FW | NIR | Dale Taylor |
| 19 | FW | NIR | Dion Charles (on loan from Huddersfield Town) |
| 20 | DF | ENG | Michael Ihiekwe |
| 21 | MF | FIN | Ilmari Niskanen |
| 22 | MF | IRL | CJ Hamilton |
| 23 | GK | NIR | Luke Southwood |
| 26 | DF | ENG | Finley Munroe (on loan from Middlesbrough) |
| 28 | DF | ENG | Jordan Williams (on loan from Portsmouth) |
| 32 | DF | ENG | Josh Earl |
| 39 | FW | ENG | Shay Mannix |
| 41 | FW | ENG | Billy Whaite |
| 43 | GK | ENG | Charlie Brier |
| 46 | DF | ENG | Oli Hunter |
| 48 | GK | ENG | Kai Crowe |
| 49 | DF | ENG | Harry Quinn |

=== Out on loan ===
Note: Flags indicate national team as defined under FIFA eligibility rules; some limited exceptions apply. Players may hold more than one non-FIFA nationality.

| No. | Pos. | Nation | Player |
|---|---|---|---|
| 29 | MF | ENG | Theo Upton (at AFC Fylde until 30 June 2027) |
| 37 | FW | ENG | James Butterworth (at Bamber Bridge until 1 January 2027) |

=== Reserve team ===
Up until the 2009–10 season the reserve team competed in the Central League Division One West. They have been Central League champions twice, in 1919–20 and 1949–50.

With the first team promoted to the Premier League, for the 2010–11 season the reserves competed in the Premier Reserve League. They were in North Group B, with Blackburn Rovers, Everton, Liverpool and Sunderland. At the end of the campaign, the club withdrew from reserve league football, preferring to play such games behind closed doors.

Blackpool reintroduced reserve-team football for the 2019–20 season. They joined a regional five-team Central Division. But at the end of the 2023–24 season, it was announced that the team would withdraw from the Central Division, with the club opting for loan-based development for younger players coming through the ranks.

=== Academy ===
The club's Academy, headed by Ciaran Donnelly, is rated as Category 3 (the highest, of four categories, being Category 1). It consists of an under-18s squad and a development squad. As of 2021, the academy had around 140 players, ranging in age from six to twenty-one, and employed twelve full-time members of staff. Its facilities are split between Myerscough College and Blackpool's Stanley Park.

=== Internationals ===
Blackpool have had 59 full-international representatives. Their first was Fred Griffiths, for Wales, in 1900. Their most recent was Bailey Peacock-Farrell, for Northern Ireland, in 2025. In 1996, Northern Ireland's James Quinn became the club's first player in sixteen years to be selected for a full international, the previous one being Derek Spence in 1980.

Many players won additional caps with other clubs, but the totals given below apply solely to appearances made while with Blackpool.

As of 4 September 2025

United Kingdom and Ireland

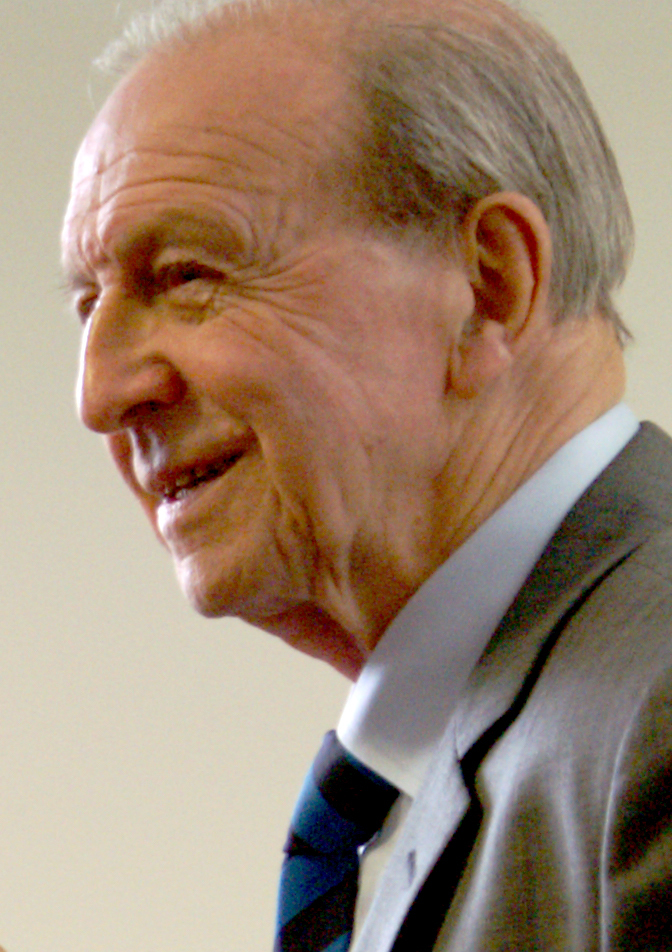
Jimmy Armfield won 43 caps for England between 1959 and 1966, and captained his country on fifteen occasions

England (13)
| Name | Years | Caps | Goals |
|---|---|---|---|
| Harry Bedford | 1923–1924 | 2 | 1 |
| Jimmy Hampson | 1930–1932 | 3 | 5 |
| Harry Johnston | 1946–1953 | 10 | 0 |
| Stan Mortensen | 1947–1953 | 25 | 23 |
| Stanley Matthews | 1947–1957 | 37 | 3 |
| Eddie Shimwell | 1949 | 1 | 0 |
| Tommy Garrett | 1952–1953 | 3 | 0 |
| Ernie Taylor | 1953 | 1 | 0 |
| Bill Perry | 1955–1956 | 3 | 2 |
| Jimmy Armfield | 1959–1966 | 43 | 0 |
| Ray Charnley | 1962 | 1 | 0 |
| Tony Waiters | 1964 | 5 | 0 |
| Alan Ball | 1965–1966 | 14 | 1 |

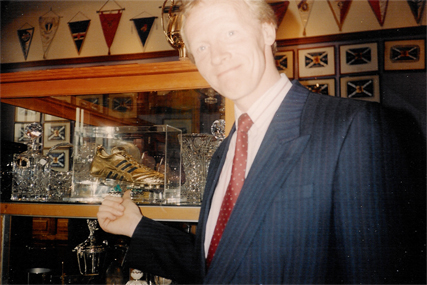
Derek Spence, who had two spells at Blackpool, won fifteen caps and scored three goals for Northern Ireland during his time at the club

Northern Ireland (10) (Note: Prior to 1924, there was only one Irish national team. In that year, the Republic of Ireland began playing separate matches, and that position is reflected here.)
| Name | Years | Caps | Goals |
|---|---|---|---|
| Sammy Jones | 1933 | 1 | 1 |
| Peter Doherty | 1934 | 4 | 0 |
| Malcolm Butler | 1939 | 1 | 0 |
| Derek Spence | 1977–1979 | 14 | 3 |
| James Quinn | 1996–1997 | 10 | 1 |
| Craig Cathcart | 2010–2014 | 18 | 0 |
| Jordan Thompson | 2019 | 5 | 0 |
| Daniel Ballard | 2020–2021 | 5 | 0 |
| Shayne Lavery | 2021–2023 | 12 | 3 |
| Bailey Peacock-Farrell | 2025– | 1 | 0 |

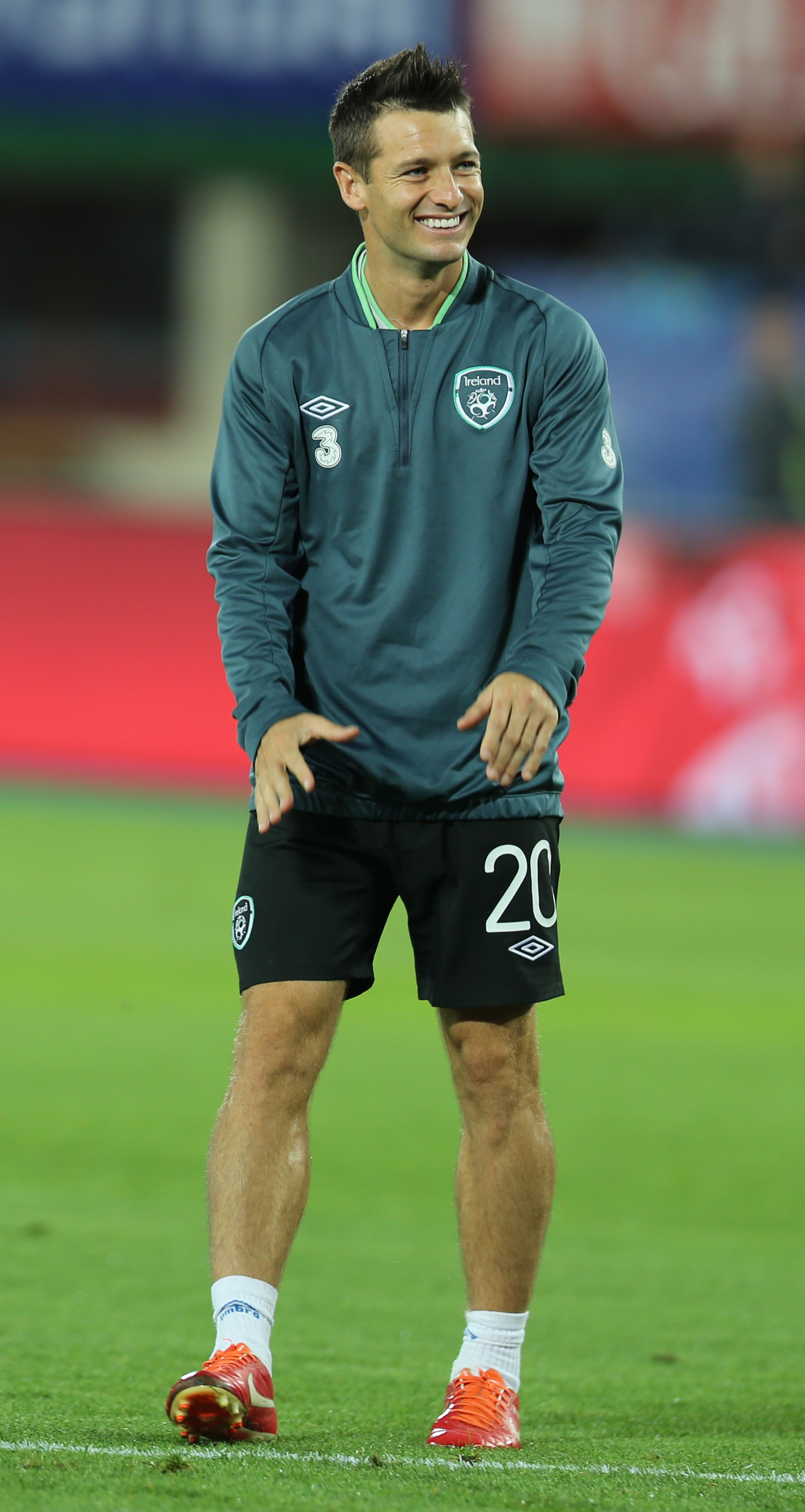
Wes Hoolahan received his first cap for the Republic of Ireland while at Blackpool in 2008

Republic of Ireland (3)
| Name | Years | Caps | Goals |
|---|---|---|---|
| Mickey Walsh | 1976–1977 | 4 | 1 |
| Wes Hoolahan | 2008 | 1 | 0 |
| CJ Hamilton | 2022 | 1 | 0 |

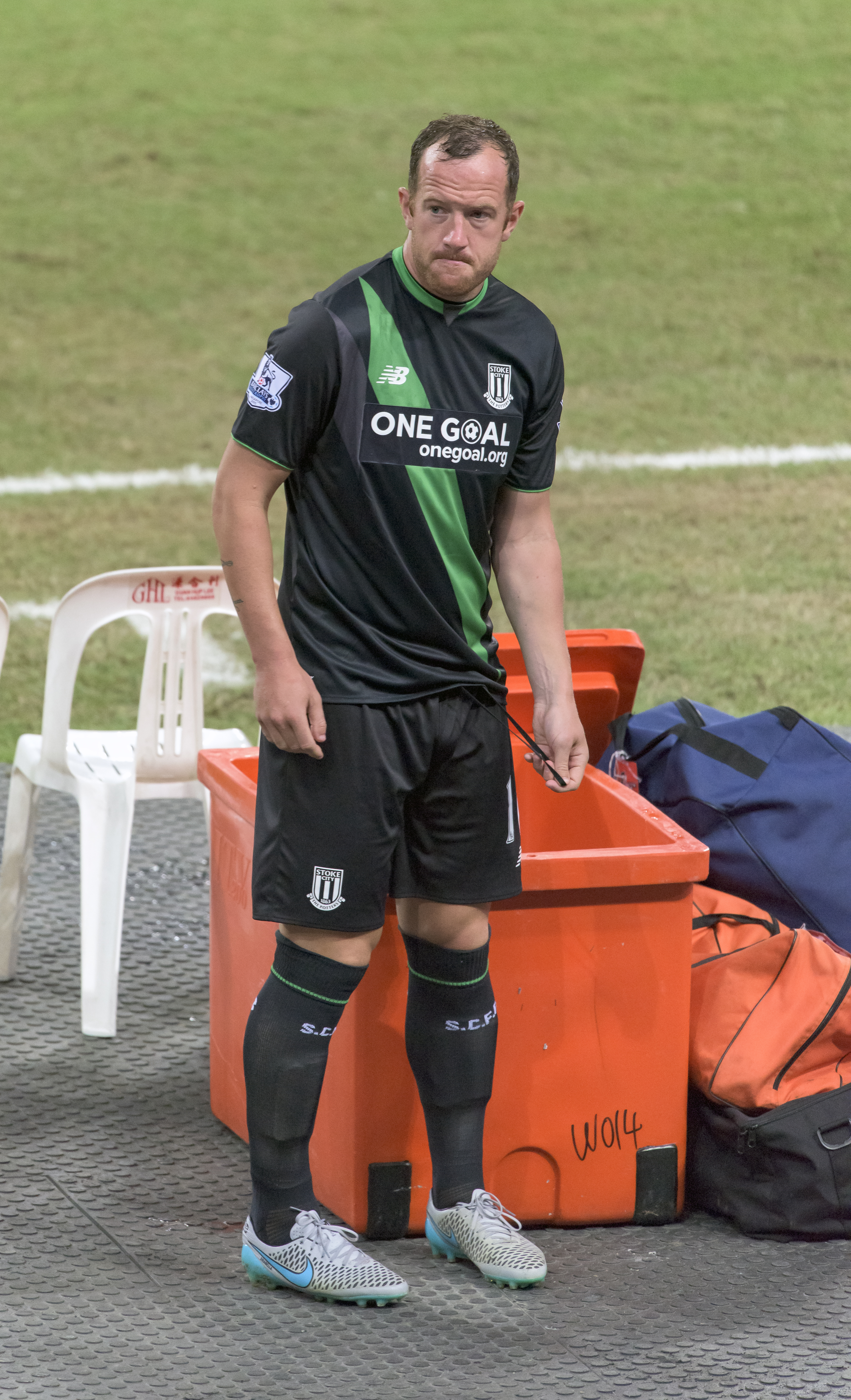
Charlie Adam won seven Scotland caps during his two years with the club

Scotland (13)
| Name | Years | Caps | Goals |
|---|---|---|---|
| Phil Watson | 1933 | 1 | 0 |
| Alex Munro | 1938 | 1 | 0 |
| Frank O'Donnell | 1938 | 2 | 0 |
| Jimmy Blair | 1946 | 1 | 0 |
| Allan Brown | 1952–1954 | 10 | 3 |
| George Farm | 1952–1959 | 10 | 0 |
| Hugh Kelly | 1952 | 1 | 0 |
| Jackie Mudie | 1956–1958 | 17 | 9 |
| Tony Green | 1971–1972 | 6 | 0 |
| Charlie Adam | 2009–2011 | 9 | 0 |
| Stephen Crainey | 2010–2011 | 6 | 0 |
| Matt Phillips | 2012 | 2 | 0 |
| Matt Gilks | 2012–2013 | 3 | 0 |

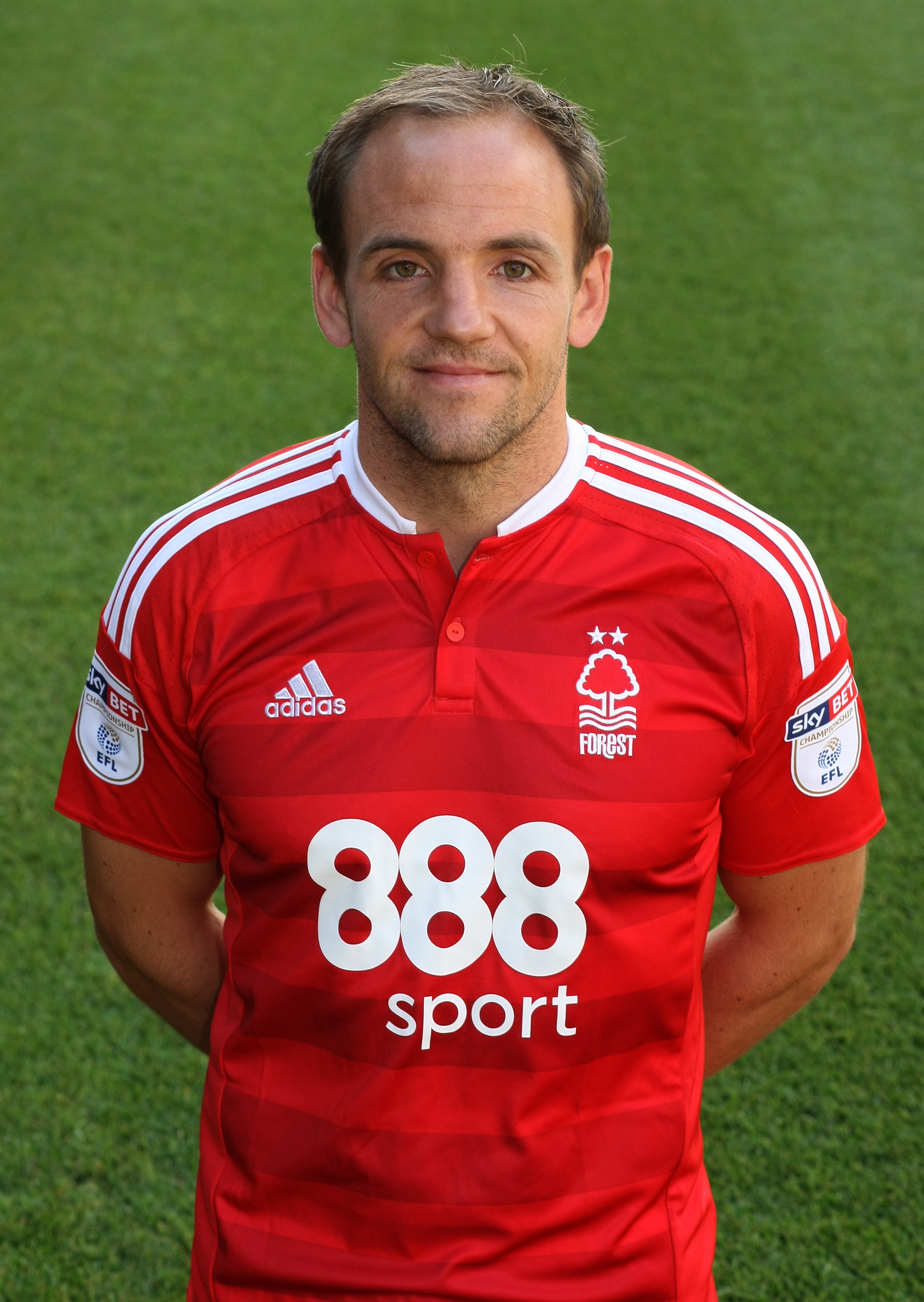
David Vaughan was capped eight times for Wales during his three years at Bloomfield Road

Wales (6)
| Name | Years | Caps | Goals |
|---|---|---|---|
| Fred Griffiths | 1900 | 2 | 0 |
| Dai Astley | 1939 | 1 | 1 |
| Glyn James | 1966–1971 | 9 | 0 |
| Wyn Davies | 1973 | 1 | 0 |
| David Vaughan | 2008–2011 | 12 | 1 |
| Neal Eardley | 2009–2011 | 6 | 0 |

Europe

Belarus (1)
| Name | Years | Caps | Goals |
|---|---|---|---|
| Sergei Kornilenko | 2011 | 2 | 1 |

Estonia (1)
| Name | Years | Caps | Goals |
|---|---|---|---|
| Sergei Zenjov | 2014 | 6 | 0 |

Iceland (1)
| Name | Years | Caps | Goals |
|---|---|---|---|
| Daníel Grétarsson | 2021 | 4 | 0 |

Israel (1)
| Name | Years | Caps | Goals |
|---|---|---|---|
| Dekel Keinan | 2010 | 3 | 0 |

Latvia (1)
| Name | Years | Caps | Goals |
|---|---|---|---|
| Kaspars Gorkšs | 2007–2008 | 14 | 1 |

Malta (1)
| Name | Years | Caps | Goals |
|---|---|---|---|
| Daniel Bogdanović | 2011–2012 | 3 | 0 |

Oceania

Australia (2)
| Name | Years | Caps | Goals |
|---|---|---|---|
| David Carney | 2010–2011 | 7 | 2 |
| Kenny Dougall | 2021 | 4 | 0 |

Africa

Algeria (1)
| Name | Years | Caps | Goals |
|---|---|---|---|
| Hamer Bouazza | 2009–2010 | 6 | 1 |

Congo (1)
| Name | Years | Caps | Goals |
|---|---|---|---|
| Christoffer Mafoumbi | 2019 | 3 | 0 |

Ghana (1)
| Name | Years | Caps | Goals |
|---|---|---|---|
| Richard Kingson | 2010–2011 | 3 | 0 |

Sierra Leone (1)
| Name | Years | Caps | Goals |
|---|---|---|---|
| Sullay Kaikai | 2021 | 1 | 0 |

CONCACAF

Costa Rica (1)
| Name | Years | Caps | Goals |
|---|---|---|---|
| José Miguel Cubero | 2014 | 1 | 0 |

Jamaica (1)
| Name | Years | Caps | Goals |
|---|---|---|---|
| Kevin Stewart | 2022 | 2 | 0 |

=== One-club men ===
Nine players spent their entire professional playing careers with Blackpool:

| Name | Years | Apps | Goals |
|---|---|---|---|
| Bob Birket | 1896–1906 (10) | 215 | 44 |
| Edward Threlfall | 1900–1911 (11) | 320 | 11 |
| John Charles | 1912–1924 (12) | 228 | 30 |
| Bert Tulloch | 1914–1924 (10) | 178 | 0 |
| Harry Johnston | 1934–1955 (21) | 398 | 11 |
| Hugh Kelly | 1943–1960 (17) | 428 | 8 |
| Jimmy Armfield | 1954–1971 (17) | 569 | 6 |
| Glyn James | 1960–1975 (15) | 399 | 22 |
| Mike Davies | 1984–1995 (11) | 310 | 16 |

=== Training facility ===
Blackpool's training ground, currently known as the e-Energy Training Centre, is located in the Squires Gate area of Blackpool's South Shore. It has been used, with minimal upkeep, since the 1940s. It was described by Blackpool manager Ian Holloway as a "hell hole" in 2009, shortly after which chairman Karl Oyston pledged to build a new facility. "We are never going back to our training ground again," explained Holloway. "Every player this club has ever had hates it, and every player we have is frightened of it. It is a horrible environment to work in." In 2009, with the training ground frozen, Holloway attempted to train on Blackpool's beach, but that too was iced over. An initial plan was to use the facilities of Fylde Rugby Club, but training is still held at the two-pitch Squires Gate, however, and no development has come to fruition.

In August 2014, former Blackpool defender Alex Baptiste reminisced on his time at Squires Gate: "No balls in training, having to run on the beach because the pitch had been frozen for two weeks, no food after training, leaks in the Portacabins, having to buy our own weights – just random stuff like that! It was definitely an experience!"

In June 2020, the club purchased a modular building for the training ground. It includes changing facilities for players and staff, along with eating areas, meeting rooms and medical facilities.

A site for a new training facility, bordering the Grange Park Estate and Baines School on Garstang Road, was purchased in May 2022. The new training facility, combined with replacing Bloomfield Road's temporary East Stand with a permanent structure, is estimated to cost between £30 and £40 million. A planning application was expected to be submitted in May 2023.

== Managers ==
Including repeat appointments, there have been 43 full-time managers of Blackpool F.C., the first being Bill Norman between 1918 and 1923. The longest-serving manager was Joe Smith, who occupied the role for 23 years; Michael Appleton, meanwhile, lasted 65 days in the role in his first stint at the club. Blackpool has, on average, appointed a new manager just under every three years. As of October 2025, the club has had fourteen full-time managers in thirteen years.

There have been five repeat appointments: Bob Stokoe, Allan Brown, Simon Grayson, Michael Appleton and Neil Critchley.

In 2014, Jose Riga became the club's first foreign manager.

In 2020, Neil Critchley became the first appointment to be known as a head coach.

== Non-playing staff ==
Owner: Simon Sadler

Chief executive officer: David Downes

Head of Finance: Jordan Sumner

Chief Operating Officer: Nick Horne

Club Secretary: Harry Lyons

Head coach: Ian Evatt

Assistant head coach: Stephen Crainey

First-team coach: Stephen Dobbie

First-team coach: Steve Thompson

Goalkeeping coach: Steve Banks

Under-18s coach: Matthew Blinkhorn

Academy director: Ciaran Donnelly

== Honours ==
Blackpool were the first team to be promoted through all divisions of the Football League via the play-off system and the club has the most play-off trophies (6).

League

- Second Division / Championship (level 2)
  - Champions: 1929–30
  - Promoted: 1936–37, 1969–70
  - Play-off winners: 2010
- League One (level 3)
  - Play-off winners: 2007, 2021
- Fourth Division / Third Division / League Two (level 4)
  - Promoted: 1984–85
  - Play-off winners: 1992, 2001, 2017

Cup

- FA Cup
  - Winners: 1952–53
- Football League Trophy
  - Winners: 2001–02, 2003–04
- Anglo-Italian Cup
  - Winners: 1971
- Football League War Cup
  - Winners: 1943
- Lancashire Senior Cup
  - Winners: 1935–36, 1936–37, 1941–42, 1953–54, 1993–94, 1994–95, 1995–96

== Records ==
=== Club ===
- Highest finish: 2nd in Division One (1955–56)
- Lowest finish: 21st in Division Four (1982–83)

=== Players ===
- Most Football League appearances: Jimmy Armfield (569; between 27 December 1954 and 1 May 1971)
- Top goalscorer: Jimmy Hampson (252; between 15 October 1927 and 8 January 1938)
- Most capped player: Jimmy Armfield (43; for England)

=== Managers ===
- Longest-serving manager: Joe Smith (22 years, 9 months; from 1 August 1935 to 30 April 1958)

== Tangerine TV ==
In August 2021, the club launched Tangerine TV as a direct replacement to the EFL's iFollow streaming service.
