= Bill Norman (football manager) =

English football manager (1873–1931)

- Bill Norman, circa 1920

Personal information
- Full name: William Lewis Norman
- Date of birth: 1 June 1873
- Place of birth: Gazeley, Suffolk
- Date of death: 16 September 1931 (aged 58)
- Place of death: West Hartlepool, County Durham

Managerial career
- Years: Team
- 1918–1923: Blackpool
- 1927–1931: Hartlepools United

William Lewis Norman (1 June 1873 – 16 September 1931) was an English football manager for Blackpool and Hartlepools United. He managed a total of 345 games, securing a 37.7 win-percentage over his career.

== Life and career ==
William Lewis Norman was born on 1 June 1873 in Gazeley, Suffolk. Norman was born into a single-parent household and spent seven years in the Army as a reservist. He served in the Boer War for three years, leaving with the rank of sergeant-major.

After leaving the Army, Norman became a trainer at Barnsley. He left to join Birmingham City for a season in 1905 but returned to Oakwell, where he remained until 1913. During this period, Barnsley won the FA Cup in the 1911–12 season. He joined Huddersfield Town, along with Arthur Fairclough, in 1913.

=== Blackpool ===
Between 1918 and 1923, he was in charge of Blackpool, who became one of a growing number of clubs to appoint a full-time manager. Before that point, the team selection had been the responsibility of a committee comprising directors, the captain, and vice-captain. In his four seasons in charge at Bloomfield Road he led the Seasiders to challenge seriously for promotion on three occasions. Upon taking up his position at the seaside, Norman immediately implemented spartan training routines, assisted by his son-in-law, Alan Ure, who was also the club's trainer. This disciplined regime led to his nickname of "Sergeant-major".

After World War One, the job of rebuilding the team was always going to be a difficult one. He could rely on a number of established players, but he was also prepared to move into the transfer market as necessary, which he did frequently. His most successful signing was Harry Bedford who would score 118 goals in 180 games for the club. In 1919–20, Norman's second season at the Blackpool helm, the club missed out on promotion by a narrow margin, finishing fourth. The following season saw Blackpool finish fourth again.

After spending heavily prior to the 1921–22 season, the club struggled against relegation; indeed, only a double victory over West Ham United at the end of the season saved Blackpool from relegation into the Third Division North. Despite attracting several critics, Norman led Blackpool to the top of the table for the majority of the 1922–23 season, but once again the team collapsed in the latter stages and promotion passed them by again.

=== Leeds United ===
In the summer of 1923, Norman and Ure left Blackpool to join Leeds United. At Elland Road, the former became assistant to Arthur Fairclough, with whom he had worked at Barnsley. Norman helped take Leeds into First Division. However, when the Yorkshire club were relegated in 1927, both he and Fairclough resigned.

=== Hartlepools United ===
Following the departure of Jack Manners, Norman was appointed as the new manager of Third Division North side Hartlepools United on 1 August 1927. In his first season with the club, Norman's striker, Billy Robinson, set a new club record of 28 goals in 33 league games. He also discovered W.G. Richardson, who later became a star with West Bromwich Albion. In the summer of 1931, Norman fell ill and was unable to continue full time. Hartlepools appointed Jackie Carr as a player-coach to replace him. On 16 September 1931, Norman died at the age of 58 in Howbeck Hospital, West Hartlepool.

== Managerial statistics ==
Team	Nat	From	To	Record				
Team	Nat	From	To	G	W	L	D	Win %
Blackpool	(England)	1 August 1918	31 May 1923	176	76	62	38	43.18
Hartlepools United	(England)	29 July 1927	16 September 1931	169	54	85	30	31.29
Total				345	130	147	68	37.68
