= 1918–19 Blackpool F.C. season =

English football club season

Blackpool F.C.
1918–19 season
- Manager: Bill Norman
- Football League, Lancashire Section: 11th (Principal Competition)
- Football League, Lancashire Section, Group A: 1st (Subsidiary Competition)
- FA Cup: Competition suspended
- Top goalscorer: League: All: Thomas Hunter (18)
- Highest home attendance: 12,000
- Lowest home attendance: 2,000
Home colours

The 1918–19 season was Blackpool F.C.'s fourth and final season in special wartime football during World War I. They competed in two Football League competitions spread over the full season — the Lancashire Section, Northern Group Principal Competition, for thirty games, and then in the Lancashire Section, Group A, Subsidiary Competition, for a further six games. The club finished in 11th place in the principal competition and first in the subsidiary competition, which led to their appearance in the Lancashire Senior Cup. They lost to Liverpool at the semi-final (or first) stage by a single goal at Bloomfield Road.

Bill Norman became Blackpool's first full-time manager prior to the start of the season. Thomas Hunter was, for the second consecutive season, the club's top scorer, with eighteen goals (fourteen in the principal competition and four in the subsidiary), including four in the penultimate game of the Principal Competition, a 6–0 victory at home to Southport Vulcan.

The FA Cup was suspended for the duration of the war.

== Background ==
As with the previous wartime seasons, Blackpool had to rely on a small nucleus of players supplemented by soldiers stationed in the town and the occasional league players as guests to make up the numbers. Again, they also had to rely on staff from the Royal Army Medical Corps Depot (RAMC) based at Squires Gate. Three of the players who made their debuts for the club in the 1918–19 season — Jimmy Heathcote, Harry Mingay and Eugene O'Doherty — went on to sign professional terms with the club for the 1919–20 season, as did Edmund Berry and Horace Fairhurst, who had made their debuts the previous season, as well as striker Thomas Hunter.

== Football League Group A ==
=== Lancashire Section, Northern Group Principal Competition ===
The Principal competition for the 1917–18 season consisted of sixteen teams:

- Blackpool
- Blackburn Rovers
- Bolton Wanderers
- Bury
- Burnley
- Everton
- Liverpool
- Manchester City
- Manchester United
- Oldham Athletic
- Port Vale
- Preston North End
- Rochdale
- Southport Vulcan
- Stockport County
- Stoke City

Blackpool began the campaign on 7 September 1918, with a home match against Oldham Athletic, which they lost 4–1, and Bolton completed the double over the Seasiders in the following match with a 2–1 win at Burnden Park on 14 September. As with previous wartime seasons, they found team selection a problem, and by the sixth game had used twenty different players. Against Port Vale on 28 September they had only ten players and had to borrow a player from the home side. They remained without a win in the first nine games (three draws and six losses), which saw them in last place, and it took until 9 November for their first victory, 3–1 at home to Oldham Athletic. They followed that up with a double over Blackburn Rovers, beating them at Ewood Park 3–0 on 16 November and then a week later at Bloomfield Road, 2–0. However, they followed this up with three consecutive defeats, and after a 5–1 win over Rochdale on 21 December, by mid-February 1919 they had won only two further games. Jimmy Heathcote, who was at the time a soldier based at the RAMC Depot, made his debut for the club on 8 February in a 1–1 draw at home to Burnley, a game which also saw the return of Horace Fairhurst. In the return fixture, another RAMC soldier, Harry Mingay, made his debut in goal in a 3–0 defeat. He was the club's goalkeeper for the final seven games of the season as they won five and lost two. Both he and Heathcote signed professional terms with the club at the end of the season. On 15 Mar Blackpool played Liverpool at Anfield, and although the Seasiders lost 3–1, the game was notable for its being played in front of the largest wartime crowd: 24,000. With five wins in six games, Blackpool moved off the bottom of the table and the club's directors declared: "The appeal was made to them to favour us with three home victories has not been in vain, and they unselfishly threw in two away victories for make-weight. Truly they deserve our unstinting praise, which every Blackpool supporter will disperse individually and collectively." However, they ended the season with a 5–1 defeat to Manchester United at Old Trafford and finished the season in 11th place, with Everton crowned champions.

Pos	Team	Pld	W	D	L	GF	GA	GR	Pts
11	Blackpool	30	10	5	15	45	61	0.738	25

=== Lancashire Section, Group A, Subsidiary Competition ===
For the Subsidiary Competition, the Lancashire League was again divided into four, with the games played amalgamated at the end of the season to give a composite table. The winners of each group then competed in the Lancashire Senior Cup, with the winner of that going on to meet the winner of the Football League, Midland Section subsidiary tournament in a Championship play-off match.

Blackpool were again placed in Group A which contained four teams:

- Blackburn Rovers
- Blackpool
- Burnley
- Preston North End

As with previous seasons, the first match in the Subsidiary Competition was held in the middle of the Principal Competition, with an away game at Burnley on Christmas Day, 1918, which they lost 5–1. It was to be their only defeat, and when the competition resumed in April 1919 they won three and drew two of the remaining five fixtures. On 5 April, they drew 1–1 with Blackburn Rovers at Ewood Park in front of a crowd of 12,000, which Rovers described as their best gate since 1914. In the matchday programme for the return fixture on 12 April was the message, "With pardonable pride we approach the Easter programme full of confidence and on the tip-toe of expectancy, for have we not three home games in a week? What a feast! 'The Rovers', 'Burnley' and 'North End' come to Bloomfield Road, gentlemen, so mark the occasion and line the ropes yards deep, after signifying your appreciation at the turnstiles. Then yell 'Blackpool' for all you're worth! And don't forget t'others!" A crowd of 8,000 saw them achieve their largest victory of the season, 6–1. They followed that up on Good Friday, 18 April, with a 1–1 draw against Burnley in front of their first five-figure crowd of the wartime seasons, 12,000. The following day they beat Preston North End at Bloomfield Road 3–0 in front of a crowd of 10,000, and ended the'season on 26 April with a 2–0 win at Deepdale. As winners of Group C, they qualified along with the other three group winners — Oldham Athletic (Group B), Manchester City (Group C) and Liverpool (Group D) — for the Lancashire Senior Cup semi-finals.

Pos	Team	Pld	W	D	L	GF	GA	GR	Pts
1	Blackpool	6	3	2	1	13	7	1.857	8

==== Lancashire Senior Cup ====
Blackpool met Liverpool in the semi-finals at Bloomfield Road on 24 May, with Liverpool winning 1–0. However, the game was overshadowed by controversy as many in the crowd of 7,000 felt that Blackpool had been "over-refereed", with claims that the official, Mr J. A. Alderston of Earlstown, distinctly favoured Liverpool, in particular when in the last few minutes of the game he denied what many thought was a clear penalty for Blackpool. At the final whistle, supporters demonstrated against the referee who had to be escorted off the pitch by police officers, as fans hurled sand and pieces of the turf at him. What was described as "a large number of people" stood outside the stand after the match and it took an appeal by the club's directors "to disperse in the interests of the club" before they left the ground. An official enquiry was launched, and the Lancashire County Football Association (LFA) appointed their president to chair it. The final hearing was held on 3 July when the referee, Mr Alderson was "lightly reprimanded" for not originally reporting the incident (he had not done so until instructed by members of the LFA who had been at the match); however, no action was taken against the club as the demonstration was deemed "not to be of so serious a nature," although club director Albert Hargreaves was cautioned for "making indscreet remarks" about the officials in the referee's dressing room after the game.

== Summary ==
A mixed season saw Blackpool struggle in the Principal Competition, in which they only climbed off the foot of the table toward the end of the season to finish in 11th place. They won Group A of the Subsidiary Competition, however, and so qualified for the Lancashire Senior Cup semi-finals, in which the defeat to Liverpool, which caused controversy, saw the four-year period of wartime football draw to a close for the club.

Harold Keenan made the most appearances, with 34 (28 in the Principal Competition and six in the Subsidiary Competition). Thomas Hunter was next, with 33 league appearances (27 in the Principal Competition and six in the Subsidiary Competition), followed by Bobby Booth, with 29 (23 in the Principal Competition and six in the Subsidiary Competition) and Eugene O'Doherty, with 27 (21 in the Principal Competition and six in the Subsidiary Competition).

Over the four wartime seasons, Blackpool had used a total of 153 different players in the 145 official wartime games, plus at least another 21 in friendly games. Bobby Booth made the most appearances, playing in 88 official plus six other games. Jack Connor played in 76 official plus eight other games, Joe Bainbridge 73 plus four and Jimmy Jones 68 plus four. Of the soldiers who appeared, Dunn played in the most games, 59 plus five. Seven of the soldiers who had played for Blackpool in the wartime seasons went on to sign professional terms with the club — Edmund Berry, Horace Fairhurst, Jimmy Heathcote, Thomas Hunter, Henry Mingay, Albert Moorcroft and Eugene O'Doherty.

== Transfers ==
=== In ===
Date	Player	From	Fee

=== Out ===
Date	Player	From	Fee
