= Jimmy Jones (footballer, born 1889) =

English footballer

Personal information
- Full name: James Jones
- Date of birth: 9 July 1889
- Place of birth: Newburn-on-Tyne, England
- Height: 5 ft 7 3/4 in (1.72 m)
- Position: Defender

Senior career*
Years	Team	Apps	(Gls)
–1912	Gateshead Co-op	?	(?)
1912–1920	Blackpool	113	(0)
1920–1922	Bolton Wanderers	70	(0)
1922–1927	New Brighton	141	(1)
Total		324	(1)
- * Club domestic league appearances and goals

James Jones (9 July 1889 – after 1926) was a footballer who played as a defender in The Football League in the 1910s and 1920s.

Born in Newburn-on-Tyne, Jones began his career with local side Gateshead Co-op. In 1912, he signed for Blackpool, then in Division Two. He made his debut on 28 September 1912, in a 2–0 victory over Fulham at Bloomfield Road. He went on to make a further 31 league appearances during the 1912–13 campaign.

Jones was an ever-present during the 1913–14 season, only to see his place come under pressure from Bert Tulloch in 1914–15.

After four seasons of inter-war football, Jones split starting appearances in the left-back position with Horace Fairhurst in 1919–20. Jones left Blackpool at the end of the season, but Fairhurst died during the following campaign, 1920–21, from a head injury suffered during a game.

Jones joined Bolton Wanderers in the summer of 1920, and went on to make 70 league appearances for the Trotters in his two years with the club.

Jones finished his career with New Brighton in 1927, after five years with the Merseyside club.

== Post-retirement ==
After retiring, Jones returned to Blackpool as a publican.
