= Joe Bainbridge =

English footballer

Personal information
- Full name: Joseph Bainbridge
- Date of birth: 11 March 1888
- Place of birth: South Shields, England
- Date of death: 1954 (aged 65–66)
- Height: 5 ft 9 in (1.75 m)
- Position: Centre-forward

Senior career*
Years	Team	Apps	(Gls)
- South Shields
- Blyth Spartans
1911–1921	Blackpool	114	(11)
1921–1924	Southport	65	(0)
- * Club domestic league appearances and goals

Joe Bainbridge (11 March 1888 – 1954) was an English professional footballer. He spent ten years at Blackpool in the 1900s, making over 100 Football League appearances for the club. He played as a centre-forward.

== Blackpool ==
Bainbridge made his debut for Blackpool on 2 January 1911, in a 1–1 draw with Gainsborough Trinity at Bloomfield Road. He went on to make a further five appearances in the 1910–11 season, scoring once (in his second appearance, a 3–1 victory at Stockport County).

In the 1911–12 campaign, Bainbridge made ten league appearances. He didn't find the net in the league, but he did score in an FA Cup first-round (second replay) victory over Crewe Alexandra.

Bainbridge scored nine league goals in 1912–13, his third season with Blackpool, before being moved into a midfield role in 1913–14. After his change of position, he did not score again until the final game of the following 1914–15 term — the winner at Fulham on 24 April 1915.

In 1919–20, after four inter-war seasons, new Seasiders manager Bill Norman gave only one start to Bainbridge, at left-back as deputy to Horace Fairhurst. Blackpool lost the game, at South Shields, 0–6.

He was given two starts the following season, 1920–21, his final one with the club. The latter came in a 3–1 defeat at Nottingham Forest on 15 January 1921.
