= Harold Keenan =

English footballer

Personal information
- Date of birth: 20 December 1893
- Place of birth: Warrington, England
- Date of death: Unknown
- Height: 5 ft 8 in (1.73 m)
- Position: Defender

Senior career*
Years	Team	Apps	(Gls)
- Atherton
1913–1922	Blackpool	101	(3)
- * Club domestic league appearances and goals

Harold Keenan (born 20 December 1893, date of death unknown) was an English professional footballer. He spent his entire professional career with Blackpool in the early 1900s, making over 100 Football League appearances for the club. He played as a defender.

== Blackpool ==
Warrington-born Keenan made his debut for Blackpool on 25 January 1913, in a 4–2 defeat at Fulham. It was his only appearance of the 1912–13 season.

He also made one league appearance the following season, 1913–14, in a goalless draw against Notts County at Bloomfield Road on 13 April 1914, fifteen months after his first start for the club.

Keenan didn't make any appearances in 1914–15; however, in 1917–18, the third season of regional football during World War I, Keenan was ever-present in Blackpool's 36 games in the principal and subsidiary competitions. He also scored three goals.

The following season, 1918–19, the final season of inter-war football, Bill Norman was installed as Blackpool's first full-time manager. He selected Keenan in 33 of the club's 37 games.

Football League programmes returned for 1919–20, and Keenan made 35 starts in Blackpool's 42 league games. He also helped steer the club to the third round of the FA Cup, at which point they were knocked out by arch-rivals Preston North End.

In 1920–21, Keenan was again ever-present. He also scored his first League goals for the club. The first came in the opening game of the season, a 2–2 draw at Bury on 28 August. The second was in a 2–0 victory at Rotherham County on 12 February. His third was the only goal of the game at Port Vale on 26 February.

Keenan's appearances were limited in 1921–22, with just fifteen league starts.

In 1922–23, Keenan's final season with Blackpool, he appeared in just the first seven league games, the final one being a 2–1 defeat at home to Southampton on 23 September, in front of a crowd of 13,500.
