= List of Middlesbrough F.C. managers =

The following is a list of Middlesbrough managers, starting from the time when Middlesbrough turned professional in 1899 until the present.

From 1876 to 1899, the team was managed by a secretary. The most successful person to manage the club was Steve McClaren, who won the Football League Cup in 2004, the only major trophy in the club's history. Until the appointment of Aitor Karanka in November 2013, all of Middlesbrough's managers had been born in either England or Scotland.

Middlesbrough managers have retained the position an average of four years over the club's history. Since Steve Gibson's takeover as chairman in 1994, the managers initially lasted longer than the average time, as he showed patience with them, allowing them time to accomplish what they wish to with the squad; but, since 2009, managers have lasted less than the average time.

== Managers ==
Caretaker manager

- n/a Information not available

Information correct as of 31 October 2026. Only competitive matches are counted

Name	Nationality	From	To	Matches	Won	Drawn	Lost	Win%	Honours	Notes
Jack Robson	England	May 1889	May 1905	215	82	47	86	38.14	-	
Alex Mackie	Scotland	June 1905	May 1906	52	13	15	24	25.00	-	
Andy Aitken	Scotland	October 1906	February 1909	95	40	18	37	42.11	-	
John Gunter	Unknown	February 1909	June 1910	79	25	19	35	31.65	-	
Andy Walker	Scotland	June 1910	January 1911	20	9	7	4	45.00	-	
Thomas H. McIntosh	England	August 1911	December 1919	179	69	42	68	38.55	-	
James Howie	Scotland	April 1920	July 1923	132	47	37	48	35.61	-	
Herbert Bamlett	England	August 1923	March 1927	110	30	27	53	27.27	-	
Peter McWilliam	Scotland	April 1927	March 1934	328	132	75	121	40.24	Second Division 1926–27, 1928–29	
Wilf Gillow	England	March 1934	March 1944	236	92	55	89	38.98	-	
David Jack	England	November 1944	April 1952	270	100	61	109	37.04	-	
Walter Rowley	England	June 1952	February 1954	73	22	16	35	30.14	-	
Bob Dennison	England	July 1954	January 1963	381	158	77	146	41.47	-	
Raich Carter	England	January 1963	February 1966	143	46	41	56	32.17	-	
Stan Anderson	England	April 1966	25 January 1973	332	139	89	104	41.87	-	
Harold Shepherdson	England	25 January 1973	7 May 1973	17	9	4	4	52.94	-	
Jack Charlton	England	7 May 1973	21 April 1977	193	88	49	56	45.60	Second Division 1973–74, Anglo-Scottish Cup 1975–76	
John Neal	England	1 May 1977	July 1981	196	69	52	75	35.20	Kirin Cup 1980	
Bobby Murdoch	Scotland	July 1981	29 September 1982	54	9	19	26	16.67	-	
Malcolm Allison	England	23 October 1982	28 March 1984	77	24	24	29	31.17	-	
Jack Charlton	England	28 March 1984	June 1984	9	3	3	3	33.33	-	
Willie Maddren	England	3 June 1984	2 February 1986	77	17	20	40	22.08	-	
Bruce Rioch	Scotland	2 February 1986	9 March 1990	205	82	52	71	40.00	-	
Colin Todd	England	9 March 1990	24 June 1991	70	28	16	26	40.00	-	
Lennie Lawrence	England	10 July 1991	19 May 1994	157	61	43	53	38.85	-	
Bryan Robson	England	June 1994	6 December 2000	314	127	86	101	40.45	Division One 1994–95	
Terry Venables	England	6 December 2000	12 June 2001	25	8	11	6	32.00	-	
Steve McClaren	England	12 June 2001	11 May 2006	250	97	60	93	38.80	League Cup 2004	
Gareth Southgate	England	7 June 2006	20 October 2009	151	45	43	63	29.80	-	
Colin Cooper	England	20 October 2009	26 October 2009	1	0	1	0	0.00	-	
Gordon Strachan	Scotland	26 October 2009	18 October 2010	51	15	13	23	28.26	-	
Steve Agnew	England	18 October 2010	26 October 2010	2	0	0	2	0.00	-	
Tony Mowbray	England	26 October 2010	22 October 2013	153	61	37	55	39.87	-	
Mark Venus	England	23 October 2013	12 November 2013	3	1	1	1	33.33	-	
Aitor Karanka	Spain	13 November 2013	16 March 2017	171	80	42	49	47.06	-	
Steve Agnew	England	16 March 2017	9 June 2017	11	1	3	7	9.1	-	
Garry Monk	England	9 June 2017	23 December 2017	26	12	5	9	46.2	-	
Craig Liddle	England	23 December 2017	26 December 2017	1	1	0	0	100.00	-	
Tony Pulis	Wales	26 December 2017	17 May 2019	80	35	22	23	43.75	-	
Jonathan Woodgate	England	14 June 2019	23 June 2020	41	9	16	16	21.95	-	
Neil Warnock	England	23 June 2020	6 November 2021	75	29	14	32	38.7	-	
Chris Wilder	England	7 November 2021	3 October 2022	45	18	11	16	40.0	-	
Leo Percovich	Uruguay	3 October 2022	24 October 2022	5	2	1	2	40.00	-	
Michael Carrick	England	24 October 2022	4 June 2025	136	63	24	49	46.32	-	
Rob Edwards	Wales	25 June 2025	12 November 2025	16	8	5	3	50.00	-	
Adi Viveash	England	12 November 2025	26 November 2025	3	1	1	1	33.33	-	
Kim Hellberg	Sweden	26 November 2025	Present	47	24	12	11	51.06	-	
