= George Wilson (footballer, born 1892) =

English footballer

Personal information
- Date of birth: 14 January 1892
- Place of birth: Kirkham, England
- Date of death: 25 November 1961 (aged 69)
- Place of death: Blackpool, England
- Height: 5 ft 9 in (1.75 m)
- Position: Centre half

Youth career
- Willow's Rovers
- Fleetwood

Senior career*
Years	Team	Apps	(Gls)
- Morecambe
1912–1920	Blackpool	83	(14)
1920–1925	Sheffield Wednesday	185	(5)
1925–1930	Nelson	160	(18)

International career
1921–1924	England	12	(0)
- * Club domestic league appearances and goals

George Wilson (14 January 1892 – 25 November 1961) was an English footballer who played in his club career at Blackpool and Sheffield Wednesday between 1912 and 1925. He made twelve appearances for England, seven as captain.

== Career ==
Wilson was born in Kirkham, Lancashire, and after playing schoolboy football in both Blackpool and Preston, he joined Fleetwood and then Morecambe, playing in the West Lancashire League. He was spotted by a third Fylde Coast club, Blackpool, and signed for the Bloomfield Road outfit in early 1912, making his debut on 27 January in a home victory over Fulham.

After starting his first two games as a forward, Wilson was moved into a midfield role for the final seven games of the 1911–12 season. His only goal for Blackpool that campaign was the winner in a single-goal victory over Birmingham City at Bloomfield Road on 20 April 1912. He was Blackpool's top scorer in his second season at the club, with ten goals in 24 League appearances. Despite his efforts, Blackpool finished at the foot of the Second Division table, but were re-elected for the following season, of which he missed all but one game due to injury. On his return to the team during 1914–15, he established himself at centre half, and managed to get two goals to his name – the first in a 5–1 rout of Clapton Orient on 6 February 1915, and the second in a 2–1 defeat at Nottingham Forest seven days later.

By the time that League football resumed after the First World War, he was "reckoned to be one of the best centre-halves in the game". In his final season at Blackpool, 1919–20, he made 22 League appearances and scored one goal – in the opening game of the season, a 4–2 victory over Leeds City at Bloomfield Road.

His form attracted him to clubs in the First Division and in March 1920 he crossed the Pennines to join The Wednesday for a fee of £3,000. Unfortunately, his arrival came too late to prevent Wednesday being relegated to the Second Division at the end of the 1919–20 season. Once again, he soon became the first-choice centre-half and, despite playing outside the top division, he was selected for the British Home Championship match against Wales on 14 March 1921. His England debut ended in a goalless draw. He retained his place for the next three matches, and was appointed captain for the match against Northern Ireland on 22 October 1921, which ended in a 1–1 draw.

He was unavailable for the next England match, and his place in the side, and his role as captain, was taken by Max Woosnam who thus gained his solitary England cap. Over the next few matches, Wilson shared the captaincy with Arthur Grimsdell and Charlie Buchan. He was appointed captain for a friendly match against Belgium played at The Arsenal Stadium on 19 March 1923 which ended in a 6–1 victory, with Kenneth Hegan scoring England's first two goals on his debut.

He continued to captain England until his final match against France on 17 May 1924. The match ended in a 3–1 victory, with England's goals coming from Vivian Gibbins (two) and Harry Storer. France's consolation goal was scored by Jules Dewaquez. In his England career, Wilson played twelve matches, seven as captain, with a record of four victories, four draws and four defeats.

He continued to play for Wednesday until July 1925, playing a total of 197 games in all competitions for the club, he then returned to Lancashire joining Nelson for a fee of £2,000. He gave good service to the Third Division North club over five years, before retiring from playing in the summer of 1930.

After retirement, he returned to Blackpool, where he became a licensee for thirty years until he retired in May 1961. He died six months later on 25 November 1961, aged 69.
