= James Dollins =

English footballer

Personal information
- Place of birth: Fleetwood, England
- Position: Inside forward

Senior career*
Years	Team	Apps	(Gls)
1909–1910	Burnley	8	(0)
1911–1913	Blackpool	18	(1)
- * Club domestic league appearances and goals

James W. Dollins was an English professional association footballer who played as an inside forward.

Dollins began his career with Burnley in 1909; however, after just eight league appearances he signed for the Clarets' Lancashire rivals Blackpool.

He made his debut for the Seasiders, who were yet to appoint their first full-time manager, on 4 November 1911, in a goalless draw at Gainsborough Trinity. He went on to appear in a further four games during the 1911–12 league campaign.

Dollins made thirteen starts in 1912–13 and scored his only professional goal. It came in the penultimate league game of the season: a 2–1 victory over Huddersfield Town at Bloomfield Road on 19 April. He made his final appearance for the club in the next game, a 2–1 defeat at arch-rivals Preston North End.
