= 1915–16 Blackpool F.C. season =

English football club season

Blackpool F.C.
1915–16 season
- Manager: None
- Lancashire Section, Northern Group: 3rd (Principal Competition)
- Lancashire Section, Northern Group (Group B): 2nd (Subsidiary Competition)
- FA Cup: Competition suspended
- Top goalscorer: League: All: Eddie Latheron (16)
- Highest home attendance: 5,000
- Lowest home attendance: 4,000
Home colours

The 1915–16 season was Blackpool F.C.'s first season in special wartime football during World War I. They competed in two Football League competitions spread over the full season – the Lancashire Section, Northern Group Principal Competition, for 26 games, and then in the Lancashire Section, Northern Group Subsidiary Competition, for a further ten games. The club finished third in the principal competition and second in the subsidiary competition. Eddie Latheron was the club's top scorer, with sixteen goals (thirteen in the principal competition and three the subsidiary). The FA Cup was suspended for the duration of the war.

== Background ==
With the outbreak of World War I, many professional footballers were called up to fight in the war. A conference was held in Blackpool's Winter Gardens on 3 July 1915, with representatives from the English, Irish, Scottish and Southern Football Leagues to consider whether football should be played in the 1915–16 season. A meeting of the Management Committee of the English Football League was held after the conference, during which a decision was made that football should continue, and that each league should organise their own programme. The national League was suspended and regional leagues formed with clubs being allowed to use whichever players they could get, and the registration policy was scrapped.

With a large number of British Army personnel based in the town, many of the Blackpool players during the four seasons of wartime football were soldiers. Blackpool were placed Group B, the Lancashire League, which consisted of fourteen teams. To make the season longer, it was divided into two competitions, the Principal Competition and the Subsidiary Competition.

== Football League Group A ==
=== Lancashire Section, Northern Group Principal Competition ===
The Principal competition for the 1915–16 season consisted of fourteen teams:

- Blackpool
- Bolton Wanderers
- Bury
- Burnley
- Everton
- Liverpool
- Manchester City
- Manchester United
- Oldham Athletic
- Preston North End
- Rochdale
- Southport Central
- Stockport County
- Stoke City

Some Blackpool players had enlisted, but the nucleus of the team remained for the start of the season, including goalkeeper James Mitchell, who had played only five league games the previous season and who wore glasses in matches. Other players included Jimmy Jones, Joe Bainbridge, George Wilson, Bobby Booth, Jack Charles, Len Appleton and Ben Green. With Blackburn Rovers not having a team in the competition, some of their players joined Blackpool, including Bob Crompton, who was made captain, Eddie Latheron and George Chapman.

Blackpool began the campaign on 4 September 1915, with an away match at Southport Central. The visitors lost 2–0 in front of a crowd of around 1,100 (attendances recorded during the war years were often estimated). In their next match, at home to Oldham Athletic, which they won 4–1, Blackpool played in an all-white kit, rather than the black, red and yellow hoops they had adopted the previous season. After fourteen games, Blackpool were in sixth place in the league, and with four games left were pushing for a top-two finish. On 5 February 1916, they lost 1–0 at Liverpool in front of a crowd given as 16,000, the second-highest recorded attendance to watch the club during the war years. It was their final defeat of the season, and they finished in third place with a 4–0 win over Rochdale at home in front of 4,000 on 26 February. The competition was won by Manchester City. Blackpool had used just nineteen players in the first part of the season, with Eddie Latheron finishing as top scorer with thirteen goals, and Jack Chapman second-top with nine goals.

Pos	Team	Pld	W	D	L	GF	GA	GR	Pts
3	Blackpool	26	14	3	9	54	41	1.317	31

=== Lancashire Section, Northern Group Subsidiary Competition ===
For the Subsidiary Competition, the Lancashire League was divided in two with the games played amalgamated at the end of the season to give a composite table.

Blackpool were placed in Group B which contained six teams:

- Blackpool
- Burnley
- Bury
- Bolton Wanderers
- Preston North End
- Southport Central

Blackpool's first match in the subsidiary competition was a 2–1 away win at Bury in front of a crowd of about 3,000 on 4 March 1916. After three games, Blackpool were top of the subsidiary table and they finished the season in second place. Peter Quinn, who Blackpool had originally signed in December 1910 from Spennymoor United, and who for much of the war fought with the London Scottish Regiment, spent part of his holiday time playing for Blackpool. He was the leading scorer, with seven goals. On 24 April, they played a friendly match at home to the 3rd West Lancashire Division Grouped Depots, winning 6–3.

Pos	Team	Pld	W	D	L	GF	GA	GR	Pts
2	Blackpool	10	8	0	2	24	13	1.846	16

== Overall ==
The season as a whole was considered a success by the club, both financially and on the pitch, with consistently decent attendances providing gate receipts that enabled the club's committee to reduce the club's debt. The star players were considered to be Bob Crompton, who regularly won the Man of the Match award, and Eddie Latheron for his sixteen goals.

== Transfers ==
=== In ===
Date	Player	From	Fee

=== Out ===
Date	Player	From	Fee
