= Joe Lane (footballer) =

English footballer (1892–1959

Personal information
- Full name: James Charles Lane
- Date of birth: 11 July 1892
- Place of birth: Hereford, England
- Date of death: February 1959 (aged 66)
- Place of death: Abbots Langley, England
- Height: 5 ft 9 1/2 in (1.77 m)
- Position: Forward

Youth career
- 1906–1908: Watford

Senior career*
Years	Team	Apps	(Gls)
1908–1910	Ferencváros		
1910–1912	Watford		
1912–1913	Sunderland	2	(0)
1913–1920	Blackpool	94	(65)
1920–1922	Birmingham	67	(26)
1922–1923	Millwall	28	(6)
Total		191	(97)
- * Club domestic league appearances and goals

James Charles "Joe" Lane (11 July 1892 – February 1959) was an English professional footballer who played as a forward.

After spells with Hungarian club Ferencváros and English side Sunderland, Lane signed for another English club, Blackpool, in 1913 for £400. He made his debut for the club on 22 November 1913, in a 2–2 draw at home to Leeds City, scoring one of Blackpool's goals. He went on to make a further 25 appearances during the 1913–14 campaign, scoring ten more goals.

The following season, 1914–15, he was an ever-present in Blackpool's 38 league games and one FA Cup tie. He scored 28 goals, including two hat-tricks: one in the second league game of the season, a 3–1 victory at Hull City on 5 September 1914, and all of the goals in Blackpool's victory against Glossop at Bloomfield Road on 21 November. Despite Lane's goal haul, Blackpool still only managed a tenth-placed finish after losing almost as many games as they won.

In 1915–16, World War I intervened, leading to the implementation of regional competitions. Lane served in Egypt with the Hertfordshire Yeomanry during the conflict.

When the Football League resumed in 1919–20, with Blackpool's new manager, Bill Norman, in his second season in charge, Lane continued where he had left off, netting 26 goals in 30 league appearances. He scored one hat-trick, in a 6–0 whitewash of Lincoln City at Bloomfield Road on 8 September 1919. He left Blackpool with two months of the season remaining, joining Birmingham for a Blackpool club-record fee of £3,600.

After a spell at Millwall, he finished his playing career with Watford Printing when he was in his 40s. He went on to coach at Barcelona for a period.

Lane died in Abbots Langley in February 1959, aged 66.
