= James Mitchell (footballer, born 1897) =

English footballer (1897–1975)

Personal information
- Full name: James Frederick Mitchell
- Date of birth: 18 November 1897
- Place of birth: Manchester, England
- Date of death: 30 May 1975 (aged 77)
- Height: 6 ft 1 in (1.85 m)
- Position: Goalkeeper

Senior career*
Years	Team	Apps	(Gls)
1914–1915	Blackpool	5	(0)
- Northern Nomads
1920–1922	Preston North End	21	(0)
1922–1926	Manchester City	99	(0)
1926–1927	Leicester City	0	(0)
Total		125	(0)

International career
1920	Great Britain	1	(0)
1924	England	1	(0)
- * Club domestic league appearances and goals

James Frederick Mitchell, also known as Jim Mitchell, and sometimes Fred Mitchell, (18 November 1897 – 30 May 1975) was an English footballer who played at both professional and international levels as a goalkeeper. Mitchell played professionally for five different clubs – Blackpool, Northern Nomads, Preston North End, Manchester City and Leicester City – across two different leagues – the Football League and Lancashire Combination. Mitchell played in the 1922 FA Cup final and also earned one cap for the England national side in 1924.

== Early life ==
Mitchell was born in Manchester on 18 November 1897, and he attended Arnold School and Manchester University.

== Professional career ==
Mitchell spent time with a number of different clubs including Blackpool, Northern Nomads, Preston North End, Manchester City and Leicester City. Mitchell played in leagues including the Football League and Lancashire Combination. He started his career with Football League outfit Blackpool, joining them in the 1914–15 season at the age of 17. He played five league matches for the club, deputising for Jimmy Kidd. He made his debut in a goalless draw against Lincoln City at Bloomfield Road on 20 March. Fred Thompson stood in for three matches, before Mitchell returned to the team for the final four games.

Mitchell's career was interrupted by the First World War. He played for Blackpool in the first nine games of the 1915–16, in the Principal Competition, Lancashire Section, after which Kidd took over for the remaining 27 games. After the war, he joined Northern Nomads who played in the Lancashire Combination.

Mitchell returned to the Football League when he was signed by Preston North End in 1920. In his first season with the club, he played just seven matches, five of them in the league. In the following season, he made 16 league appearances and played six FA Cup matches including the 1922 FA Cup final, which was held on 29 April 1922 at London's Stamford Bridge stadium. Preston North End, playing against Huddersfield Town, lost the match 1–0, after Billy Smith scored a penalty in the 67th minute. Mitchell wore spectacles in the match.

Mitchell left Preston in 1922 to join Manchester City and between 1922 and 1926, he played a total of 109 games for Manchester City, 99 of them in the Football League. He played 17 times in the league as Manchester City were relegated to the Football League Second Division at the end of the 1925–26 campaign. After leaving the club in 1926, Mitchell spent one season with Leicester City. However, he failed to make a first team appearance for the club, and retired from professional football in 1927.

== International career ==
While playing for Manchester City, Mitchell earned one international cap for the England national side on 22 October 1924, in a game against Ireland; England ran out as 3–1 victors. The match, which was held at the Goodison Park stadium in Liverpool, was part of the 1925 British Home Championship. Mitchell also wore spectacles in that game, and to date he remains the only player capped for England while wearing spectacles.

Mitchell also represented Great Britain at the 1920 Summer Olympics.

== Later life ==
Mitchell died at the age of 77 on 30 May 1975.

== Honours ==
Preston North End

- FA Cup runner-up: 1921–22
