= Eugene O'Doherty =

Eugene O'Doherty may refer to:

- Eugene O'Doherty (bishop)
- Eugene O'Doherty (footballer)
