= Phil Bach =

English footballer (1872–1937)

Personal information
- Full name: Philip Bach
- Date of birth: September 1872
- Place of birth: Ludlow, Shropshire, England
- Date of death: 30 December 1937
- Position: Full back

Senior career*
Years	Team	Apps	(Gls)
1888(?)–1895	Middlesbrough		
1895–1897	Reading		
1897–1899	Sunderland	43	(1)
1899–1900	Middlesbrough	0	(0)
1900–1904	Bristol City	3	(0)
1904–????	Cheltenham Town		

International career
1899	England	1	(0)
- * Club domestic league appearances and goals

Philip Bach (September 1872 – 30 December 1937) was an English footballer who played at full back. He played his club football for various teams including Middlesbrough and Sunderland and made one appearance for England in 1899. He was later the chairman of Middlesbrough F.C. for a total of 18 years.

== Playing career ==
Bach was born in Ludlow, Shropshire, but moved to Middlesbrough as a child. He was signed by the local club, Middlesbrough, then an amateur club, straight from school. In 1895, he moved to Reading and spent two seasons with the club playing in the Southern League, before returning to the north-east to join Sunderland in June 1897.

He made his Sunderland debut in a 1–0 victory at Sheffield Wednesday on 4 September 1897. In his first season at the Newcastle Road club, Sunderland finished as runners-up in the Football League with Bach making twenty appearances. On 18 February 1899, Bach made his only international appearance against Ireland. The match was played at Roker Park, Sunderland's new ground and ended in a 13–2 victory for England, with four goals from Gilbert Smith and three from Jimmy Settle. The scoreline in this match is the record number of goals scored by England in a single match, and also the highest aggregate goals (15) in a game involving England.

While England were playing at Roker Park, Sunderland were away to Sheffield Wednesday. In Bach's absence on international duty, Andy McCombie took over at right-back in a 1–0 victory. Bach was unable to regain his place, making only two further appearances.

Two months later, in April 1899, he signed for Middlesbrough again, but failing to break into the first team he was on the move again a year later joining Bristol City. Bach made his debut for Bristol City in the Southern League at right back in a 1–0 win at Swindon Town on 1 September 1900. Bach made 29 appearances in the Southern League, 10 appearances in the Western League and 3 appearances in FA Cup ties during 1900–01 as Bristol City finished runners up in the Southern League. Bristol City gained Football League status for 1901–02 but in the summer of 1901 manager Sam Hollis signed Billy Tuft from Walsall who established himself as the regular right back for the next four seasons. Bach spent four years at Ashton Gate after helping City gain Football League status in 1901 making only 3 league appearances in 1903–04. Bach made his football league debut for Bristol City at right back in the 5–0 win v Glossop on 12 September 1903. In 1904 he was re-instated as an amateur, turning out for Cheltenham Town.

== Later career ==
He developed hotel interests in Cheltenham and later Middlesbrough. He returned to Middlesbrough F.C. for the third time becoming a director in February 1911. In July he was appointed chairman in place of the disgraced Thomas Gibson-Poole. He was charged with rebuilding the club following the match-fixing scandal involving Gibson-Poole and manager Andy Walker. He appointed Thomas H. McIntosh as the new manager, who guided the club to their highest ever league position – third in the First Division in 1913–14 – but with a potential championship team taking shape his plans were interrupted by the outbreak of World War I. During the war, Boro released their players and closed down, while Ayresome Park was used as a munitions store.

Bach served as chairman until 1925, and again from 1931 to 1935. He later served on the FA Council from 1925 until his death in 1937 and was on the international selection committee from October 1929. He was also on the Football League Management Committee and President of the North Eastern League.
