= List of English football championship–winning managers =

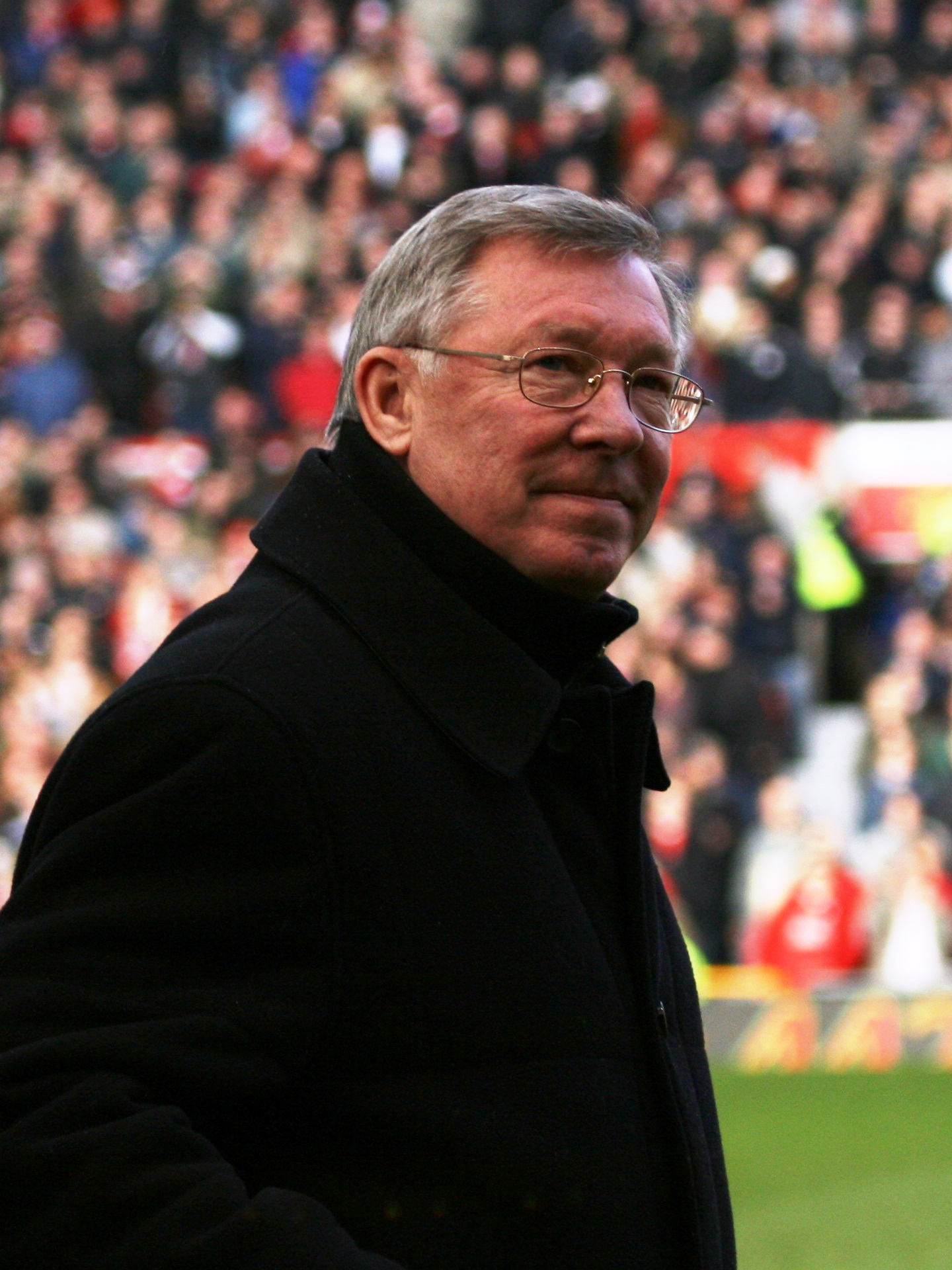
Alex Ferguson won a record 13 league championships from 1993 to 2013 as manager of Manchester United.

The top level of the English football league system from its formation in 1888 was the Football League, until the introduction of a Second Division in 1892 when it became known as the Football League First Division. This remained the top level of English football until 1992 when it was replaced by the Premier League. The role of the manager is to select the squad during the league season, develop the tactics of the team and manage potential issues within the squad.

William Sudell managed Preston North End to the inaugural championship in 1888–89, which they retained the following season, with Suddell becoming the first manager to win multiple championships. Since then, a further 24 managers have won the championship on more than one occasion. Alex Ferguson won 13 league championships as manager of Manchester United, which is the most a manager has won. George Ramsay and Bob Paisley won six league championships as managers of Aston Villa and Liverpool respectively.

Nine managers — Ted Drake, Bill Nicholson, Alf Ramsey, Joe Mercer, Dave Mackay, Bob Paisley, Howard Kendall, Kenny Dalglish and George Graham – have won the championship as a player and a manager. Dalglish is the only one to have won the championship as a player-manager, a feat he achieved in the 1985–86, 1987–88 and 1989–90 seasons. Four managers - Tom Watson, Herbert Chapman, Brian Clough and Kenny Dalglish - have won the championship with more than one club.

English managers have won the most championships, with a total of 58 championships won by 38 different managers. Scottish managers are next with 37 championships won by 10 different managers and Spanish managers are third with seven titles, six won by Pep Guardiola and one by Mikel Arteta. The last English manager to win the championship was Howard Wilkinson, who led Leeds United to victory in the 1991–92 season. Arsène Wenger became the first manager from outside the British Isles to win the championship when he guided Arsenal to the 1997–98 Premier League title. Manuel Pellegrini became the first manager from outside of Europe to win the championship when he guided Manchester City to the 2013–14 Premier League title.

== Managers ==
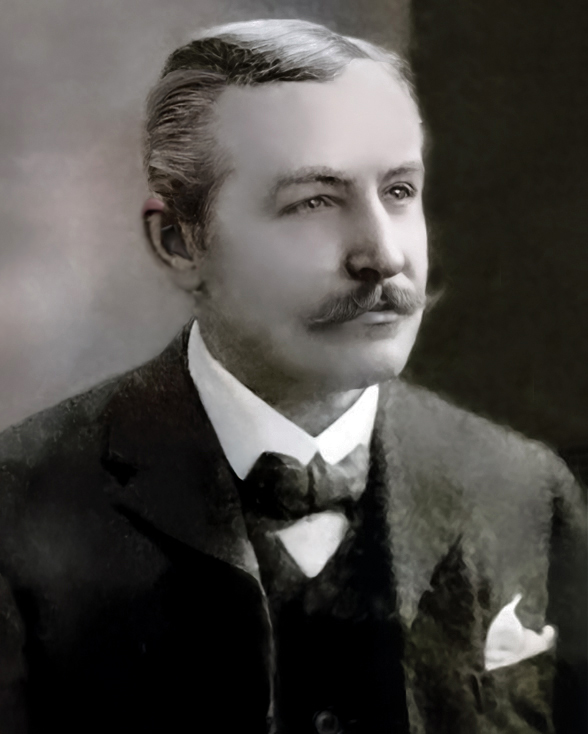
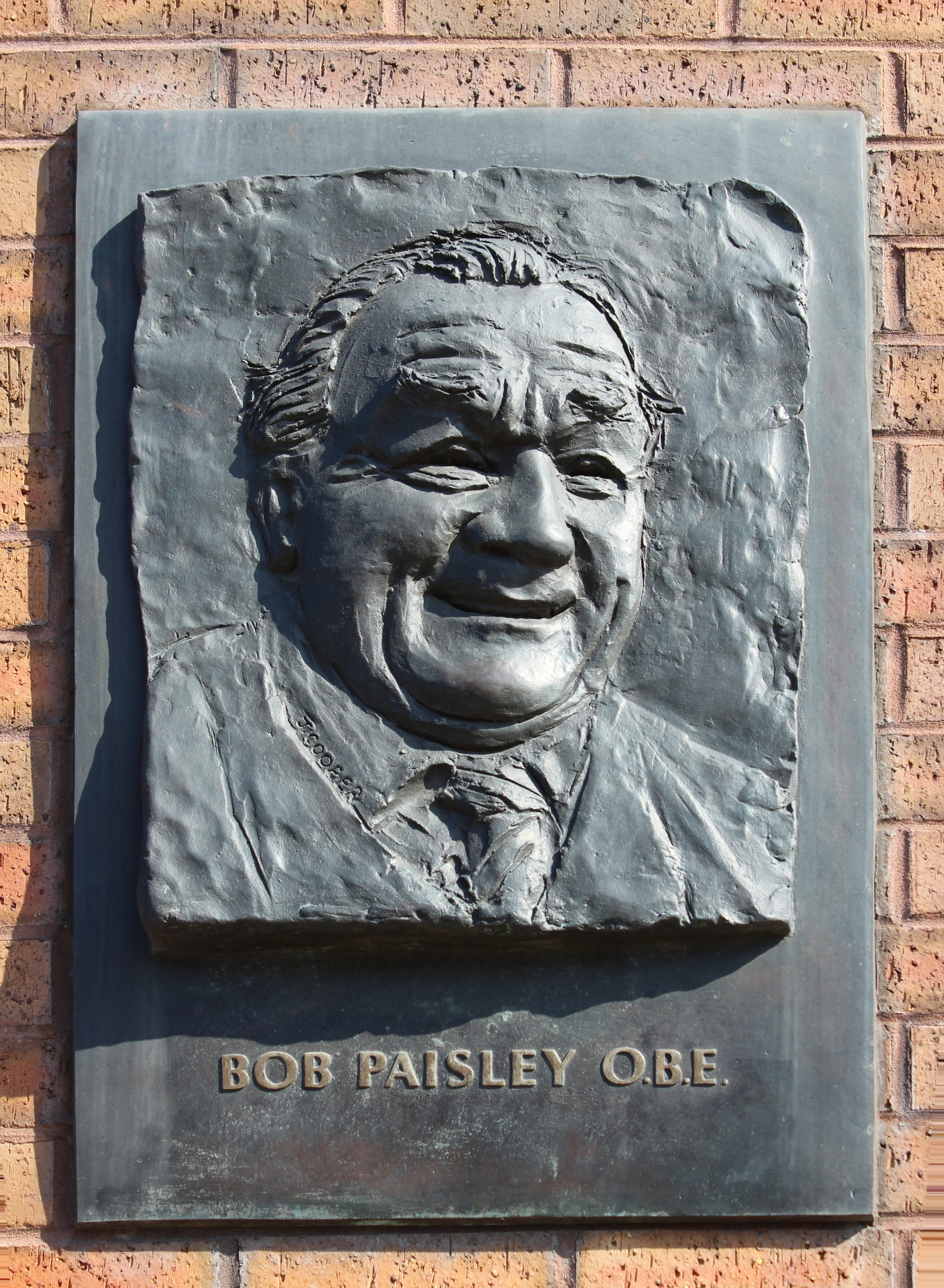
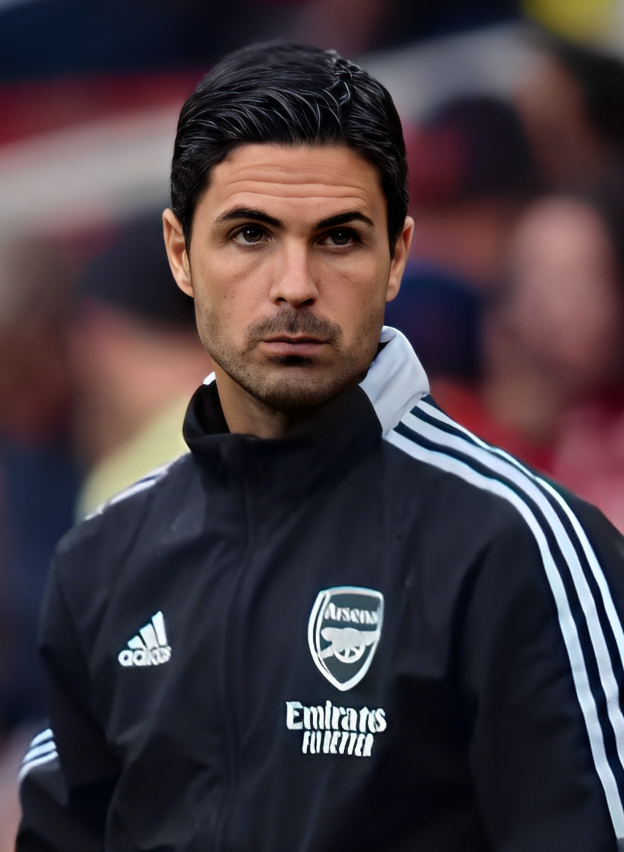
George Ramsay (left) and Bob Paisley (centre) won six league championships as managers of Aston Villa and Liverpool respectively. Mikel Arteta (right) of Arsenal is the most recent manager to have won the league championship.

English football championship-winning managers
| Season | Nationality | Manager | Club | Ref. |
|---|---|---|---|---|
| 1888–89 | England | William Sudell | Preston North End | |
| 1889–90 | England | William Sudell | Preston North End | |
| 1890–91 | England | Dick Molyneux | Everton | |
| 1891–92 | England | Tom Watson | Sunderland | |
| 1892–93 | England | Tom Watson | Sunderland | |
| 1893–94 | Scotland | George Ramsay | Aston Villa | |
| 1894–95 | England | Tom Watson | Sunderland | |
| 1895–96 | Scotland | George Ramsay | Aston Villa | |
| 1896–97 | Scotland | George Ramsay | Aston Villa | |
| 1897–98 | England | Joseph Wostinholm | Sheffield United | |
| 1898–99 | Scotland | George Ramsay | Aston Villa | |
| 1899–1900 | Scotland | George Ramsay | Aston Villa | |
| 1900–01 | England | Tom Watson | Liverpool | |
| 1901–02 | Scotland | Alex Mackie | Sunderland | |
| 1902–03 | England | Arthur Dickinson | The Wednesday | |
| 1903–04 | England | Arthur Dickinson | The Wednesday | |
| 1904–05 | Scotland | Frank Watt | Newcastle United | |
| 1905–06 | England | Tom Watson | Liverpool | |
| 1906–07 | Scotland | Frank Watt | Newcastle United | |
| 1907–08 | England | Ernest Mangnall | Manchester United | |
| 1908–09 | Scotland | Frank Watt | Newcastle United | |
| 1909–10 | Scotland | George Ramsay | Aston Villa | |
| 1910–11 | England | Ernest Mangnall | Manchester United | |
| 1911–12 | England | Robert Middleton | Blackburn Rovers | |
| 1912–13 | Ireland | Bob Kyle | Sunderland | |
| 1913–14 | England | Robert Middleton | Blackburn Rovers | |
| 1914–15 | England | Will Cuff | Everton | |
| 1915–19 (Note: No competitive football was played between 1915 and 1919 due to the First World War.) | — | — | — | — |
| 1919–20 | England | Fred Everiss | West Bromwich Albion | |
| 1920–21 | England | John Haworth | Burnley | |
| 1921–22 | England | David Ashworth | Liverpool | |
| 1922–23 | Scotland | Matt McQueen | Liverpool | |
| 1923–24 | England | Herbert Chapman | Huddersfield Town | |
| 1924–25 | England | Herbert Chapman | Huddersfield Town | |
| 1925–26 | England | Cecil Potter | Huddersfield Town | |
| 1926–27 | Scotland | Frank Watt | Newcastle United | |
| 1927–28 | England | Thomas H. McIntosh | Everton | |
| 1928–29 | England | Robert Brown | The Wednesday | |
| 1929–30 | England | Robert Brown | The Wednesday | |
| 1930–31 | England | Herbert Chapman | Arsenal | |
| 1931–32 | England | Thomas H. McIntosh | Everton | |
| 1932–33 | England | Herbert Chapman | Arsenal | |
| 1933–34 | England | Joe Shaw (caretaker) | Arsenal | |
| 1934–35 | England | George Allison | Arsenal | |
| 1935–36 | Scotland | Johnny Cochrane | Sunderland | |
| 1936–37 | England | Wilf Wild | Manchester City | |
| 1937–38 | England | George Allison | Arsenal | |
| 1938–39 | England | Theo Kelly | Everton | |
| 1939–46 (Note: In September 1939 first-class football was suspended due to the Second World War, with the 1939–40 league table voided and regional competitions contested instead.) | — | — | — | — |
| 1946–47 | England | George Kay | Liverpool | |
| 1947–48 | England | Tom Whittaker | Arsenal | |
| 1948–49 | England | Bob Jackson | Portsmouth | |
| 1949–50 | England | Bob Jackson | Portsmouth | |
| 1950–51 | England | Arthur Rowe | Tottenham Hotspur | |
| 1951–52 | Scotland | Matt Busby | Manchester United | |
| 1952–53 | England | Tom Whittaker | Arsenal | |
| 1953–54 | England | Stan Cullis | Wolverhampton Wanderers | |
| 1954–55 | England | Ted Drake | Chelsea | |
| 1955–56 | Scotland | Matt Busby | Manchester United | |
| 1956–57 | Scotland | Matt Busby | Manchester United | |
| 1957–58 | England | Stan Cullis | Wolverhampton Wanderers | |
| 1958–59 | England | Stan Cullis | Wolverhampton Wanderers | |
| 1959–60 | England | Harry Potts | Burnley | |
| 1960–61 | England | Bill Nicholson | Tottenham Hotspur | |
| 1961–62 | England | Alf Ramsey | Ipswich Town | |
| 1962–63 | England | Harry Catterick | Everton | |
| 1963–64 | Scotland | Bill Shankly | Liverpool | |
| 1964–65 | Scotland | Matt Busby | Manchester United | |
| 1965–66 | Scotland | Bill Shankly | Liverpool | |
| 1966–67 | Scotland | Matt Busby | Manchester United | |
| 1967–68 | England | Joe Mercer | Manchester City | |
| 1968–69 | England | Don Revie | Leeds United | |
| 1969–70 | England | Harry Catterick | Everton | |
| 1970–71 | England | Bertie Mee | Arsenal | |
| 1971–72 | England | Brian Clough | Derby County | |
| 1972–73 | Scotland | Bill Shankly | Liverpool | |
| 1973–74 | England | Don Revie | Leeds United | |
| 1974–75 | Scotland | Dave Mackay | Derby County | |
| 1975–76 | England | Bob Paisley | Liverpool | |
| 1976–77 | England | Bob Paisley | Liverpool | |
| 1977–78 | England | Brian Clough | Nottingham Forest | |
| 1978–79 | England | Bob Paisley | Liverpool | |
| 1979–80 | England | Bob Paisley | Liverpool | |
| 1980–81 | England | Ron Saunders | Aston Villa | |
| 1981–82 | England | Bob Paisley | Liverpool | |
| 1982–83 | England | Bob Paisley | Liverpool | |
| 1983–84 | England | Joe Fagan | Liverpool | |
| 1984–85 | England | Howard Kendall | Everton | |
| 1985–86 | Scotland | Kenny Dalglish | Liverpool | |
| 1986–87 | England | Howard Kendall | Everton | |
| 1987–88 | Scotland | Kenny Dalglish | Liverpool | |
| 1988–89 | Scotland | George Graham | Arsenal | |
| 1989–90 | Scotland | Kenny Dalglish | Liverpool | |
| 1990–91 | Scotland | George Graham | Arsenal | |
| 1991–92 | England | Howard Wilkinson | Leeds United | |
| 1992–93 | Scotland | Alex Ferguson | Manchester United | |
| 1993–94 | Scotland | Alex Ferguson | Manchester United | |
| 1994–95 | Scotland | Kenny Dalglish | Blackburn Rovers | |
| 1995–96 | Scotland | Alex Ferguson | Manchester United | |
| 1996–97 | Scotland | Alex Ferguson | Manchester United | |
| 1997–98 | France | Arsène Wenger | Arsenal | |
| 1998–99 | Scotland | Alex Ferguson | Manchester United | |
| 1999–2000 | Scotland | Alex Ferguson | Manchester United | |
| 2000–01 | Scotland | Alex Ferguson | Manchester United | |
| 2001–02 | France | Arsène Wenger | Arsenal | |
| 2002–03 | Scotland | Alex Ferguson | Manchester United | |
| 2003–04 | France | Arsène Wenger | Arsenal | |
| 2004–05 | Portugal | José Mourinho | Chelsea | |
| 2005–06 | Portugal | José Mourinho | Chelsea | |
| 2006–07 | Scotland | Alex Ferguson | Manchester United | |
| 2007–08 | Scotland | Alex Ferguson | Manchester United | |
| 2008–09 | Scotland | Alex Ferguson | Manchester United | |
| 2009–10 | Italy | Carlo Ancelotti | Chelsea | |
| 2010–11 | Scotland | Alex Ferguson | Manchester United | |
| 2011–12 | Italy | Roberto Mancini | Manchester City | |
| 2012–13 | Scotland | Alex Ferguson | Manchester United | |
| 2013–14 | Chile | Manuel Pellegrini | Manchester City | |
| 2014–15 | Portugal | José Mourinho | Chelsea | |
| 2015–16 | Italy | Claudio Ranieri | Leicester City | |
| 2016–17 | Italy | Antonio Conte | Chelsea | |
| 2017–18 | Spain | Pep Guardiola | Manchester City | |
| 2018–19 | Spain | Pep Guardiola | Manchester City | |
| 2019–20 | Germany | Jürgen Klopp | Liverpool | |
| 2020–21 | Spain | Pep Guardiola | Manchester City | |
| 2021–22 | Spain | Pep Guardiola | Manchester City | |
| 2022–23 | Spain | Pep Guardiola | Manchester City | |
| 2023–24 | Spain | Pep Guardiola | Manchester City | |
| 2024–25 | Netherlands | Arne Slot | Liverpool | |
| 2025–26 | Spain | Mikel Arteta | Arsenal | |

=== By individual ===
Key
| * | Manager is currently active |

English football championship-winning managers by individual
| Rank | Manager | Titles | Club(s) | Winning seasons |
|---|---|---|---|---|
| 1 | Alex Ferguson | 13 | Manchester United | 1992–93, 1993–94, 1995–96, 1996–97, 1998–99, 1999–2000, 2000–01, 2002–03, 2006–07, 2007–08, 2008–09, 2010–11, 2012–13 |
| 2 | George Ramsay | 6 | Aston Villa | 1893–94, 1895–96, 1896–97, 1898–99, 1899–1900, 1909–10 |
| 2 | Bob Paisley | 6 | Liverpool | 1975–76, 1976–77, 1978–79, 1979–80, 1981–82, 1982–83 |
| 2 | Pep Guardiola | 6 | Manchester City | 2017–18, 2018–19, 2020–21, 2021–22, 2022–23, 2023–24 |
| 5 | Tom Watson | 5 | Sunderland, Liverpool | 1891–92, 1892–93, 1894–95, 1900–01, 1905–06 |
| 5 | Matt Busby | 5 | Manchester United | 1951–52, 1955–56, 1956–57, 1964–65, 1966–67 |
| 7 | Frank Watt | 4 | Newcastle United | 1904–05, 1906–07, 1908–09, 1926–27 |
| 7 | Herbert Chapman | 4 | Huddersfield Town, Arsenal | 1923–24, 1924–25, 1930–31, 1932–33 |
| 7 | Kenny Dalglish | 4 | Liverpool, Blackburn Rovers | 1985–86, 1987–88, 1989–90, 1994–95 |
| 10 | Stan Cullis | 3 | Wolverhampton Wanderers | 1953–54, 1957–58, 1958–59 |
| 10 | Bill Shankly | 3 | Liverpool | 1963–64, 1965–66, 1972–73 |
| 10 | Arsène Wenger | 3 | Arsenal | 1997–98, 2001–02, 2003–04 |
| 10 | José Mourinho | 3 | Chelsea | 2004–05, 2005–06, 2014–15 |
| 14 | Arthur Dickinson | 2 | The Wednesday | 1902–03, 1903–04 |
| 14 | Ernest Mangnall | 2 | Manchester United | 1907–08, 1910–11 |
| 14 | Robert Middleton | 2 | Blackburn Rovers | 1911–12, 1913–14 |
| 14 | Thomas H. McIntosh | 2 | Everton | 1927–28, 1931–32 |
| 14 | Robert Brown | 2 | Sheffield Wednesday | 1928–29, 1929–30 |
| 14 | George Allison | 2 | Arsenal | 1934–35, 1937–38 |
| 14 | Tom Whittaker | 2 | Arsenal | 1947–48, 1952–53 |
| 14 | Bob Jackson | 2 | Portsmouth | 1948–49, 1949–50 |
| 14 | Harry Catterick | 2 | Everton | 1962–63, 1969–70 |
| 14 | Don Revie | 2 | Leeds United | 1968–69, 1973–74 |
| 14 | Brian Clough | 2 | Derby County, Nottingham Forest | 1971–72, 1977–78 |
| 14 | Howard Kendall | 2 | Everton | 1984–85, 1986–87 |
| 14 | George Graham | 2 | Arsenal | 1988–89, 1990–91 |

=== Won the League as a player and a manager ===
Nine managers have won the championship having previously won the title as a player. Of those, only one, Kenny Dalglish with Liverpool, has won the title in both roles in the same season, triumphing as player-manager in 1985–86.

Managers who won the league as player and a manager
| Name | Player club(s) | Player season(s) | Manager club(s) | Manager season(s) |
|---|---|---|---|---|
| Ted Drake | Arsenal | 1934–35, 1937–38 | Chelsea | 1954–55 |
| Bill Nicholson | Tottenham Hotspur | 1950–51 | Tottenham Hotspur | 1960–61 |
| Alf Ramsey | Tottenham Hotspur | 1950–51 | Ipswich Town | 1961–62 |
| Joe Mercer | Everton, Arsenal | 1938–39, 1947–48, 1952–53 | Manchester City | 1967–68 |
| Dave Mackay | Tottenham Hotspur | 1960–61 | Derby County | 1974–75 |
| Bob Paisley | Liverpool | 1946–47 | Liverpool | 1975–76, 1976–77, 1978–79, 1979–80, 1981–82, 1982–83 |
| Howard Kendall | Everton | 1969–70 | Everton | 1984–85, 1986–87 |
| Kenny Dalglish | Liverpool | 1978–79, 1979–80, 1981–82, 1982–83, 1983–84, 1985–86 | Liverpool, Blackburn Rovers | 1985–86, 1987–88, 1989–90, 1994–95 |
| George Graham | Arsenal | 1970–71 | Arsenal | 1988–89, 1990–91 |

=== By nationality ===
| Country | Managers | Total |
|---|---|---|
| England | 38 | 65 |
| Scotland | 11 | 41 |
| Spain | 2 | 7 |
| Italy | 4 | 4 |
| France | 1 | 3 |
| Portugal | 1 | 3 |
| Ireland | 1 | 1 |
| Chile | 1 | 1 |
| Germany | 1 | 1 |
| Netherlands | 1 | 1 |

== Bibliography ==
- Butler, Byron (1988). The Football League: The First 100 Years. Colour Library Books. ISBN 0-86283-583-6.
