= Tom Buchan =

Tom Buchan may refer to:

- Tom Buchan (footballer)
- Tom Buchan (poet)

== See also ==
- Thomas Buchan, Scottish soldier
