= Len Baker =

English footballer

Personal information
- Full name: Leonard Henry Baker
- Date of birth: 18 November 1897
- Place of birth: Sheffield, England
- Date of death: 1979 (aged 81)
- Place of death: Barnsley, England
- Height: 5 ft 10 in (1.78 m)
- Position: Wing half

Senior career*
Years	Team	Apps	(Gls)
1919–1923	Blackpool	21	(0)
1923–1925	Leeds United	11	(0)
1925–1929	Barnsley	78	(1)
1929–1930	Rochdale	34	(0)
1930–1931	Nelson	7	(0)
Total		151	(1)
- * Club domestic league appearances and goals

Leonard Henry Baker (18 November 1897 – 1979), also known as Lawrie Baker, was an English professional footballer who played as a wing half.

Baker began his professional career with Bill Norman's Blackpool in 1919, during 1918–19 inter-war competitions. When Football League competition resumed the following campaign, Baker made seven appearances, in the final seven games of the season, as the Seasiders obtained a fourth-placed finish.

In 1920–21, he made twelve appearances in sporadic fashion throughout the season, before appearing once in both 1921–22 and 1922–23.

Norman's successor, Frank Buckley, chose not to retain Baker's services for the following term, and sold him to Leeds United.

Baker made eleven League appearances for the Elland Road club, before joining Barnsley in 1925. In four years with the Tykes, he made 78 League appearances, as well as scoring his only League goal.

He joined Rochdale in 1929, for whom he made 34 League appearances, and then finished his career with Nelson.
