= List of Everton F.C. managers =

List of managers of Everton FC

Everton F.C. is a professional association football club based in Liverpool, England. The club was founded in 1878, but did not participate in competitive football until 1887, when they first took part in the FA Cup. The club has had 27 permanent managers, though this role was previously filled by the club secretary.

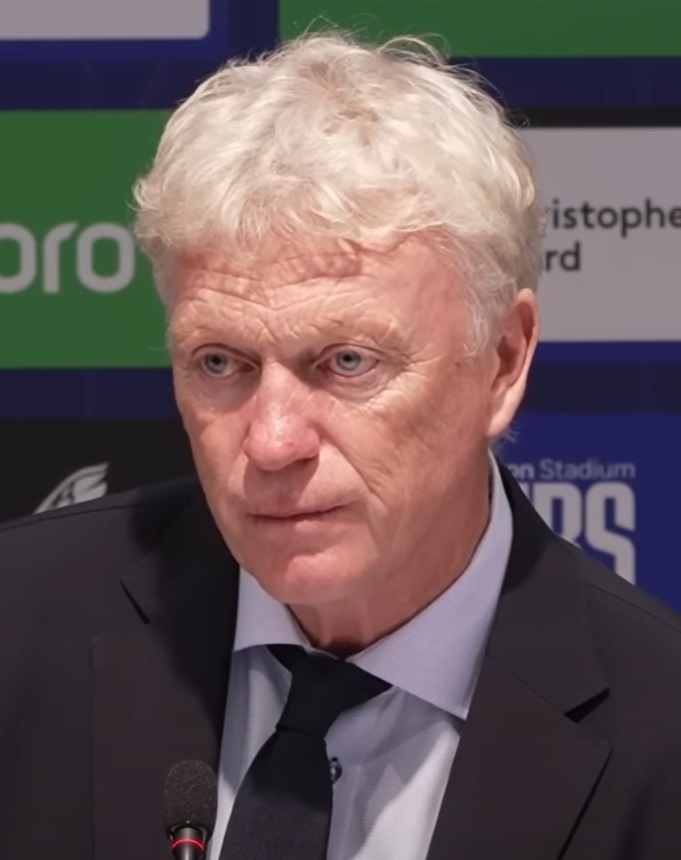
David Moyes (pictured in 2025) has served as Everton manager since January 2025, having previously served from 2002 to 2013.

== History ==
Alexander Nisbet was the club secretary, before William Edward Barclay became the club secretary for Everton's first season in the newly founded Football League but was replaced the following season by Dick Molyneux. Molyneux brought the first title to the club, winning the First Division in the 1890–91 season. He managed the club for eleven seasons before being replaced in 1901 by William C. Cuff who brought further success in the shape of another League title in the 1914–15 season and the club's first FA Cup, a 1–0 victory over Newcastle United at Crystal Palace. Between the First and Second World Wars, the club enjoyed its first prolonged period of success under the guidance of Thomas H. McIntosh. Despite relegation to the Second Division in the 1928–29 season, he led the team to back-to-back Second and First Division championships in 1931 and 1932, the 1933 FA Cup and two successful appearances in the Charity Shield. A fifth league title was secured in 1938–39 while the club was managed by Theo Kelly, while in 1946 Kelly was appointed as the club's first manager after the succession of secretaries and senior coaches who were responsible for team selection.

With the pre-War team dispersed, the club struggled to reassert its dominance in the late 1940s and eventually suffered relegation to the Second Division under Cliff Britton in the 1950–51 season. After finishing second in the 1953–54 season, the club returned to the top tier of English football, the level at which they have played ever since. In 1961, the club appointed former player Harry Catterick as manager who led the club to the league title again in both the 1962–63 and 1969–70 seasons, with the league successes punctuated by another FA Cup triumph, this time a 3–2 victory over Sheffield Wednesday at Wembley.

The club failed to achieve further league or cup success until the appointment of former Everton player and club captain Howard Kendall in 1981. While results were initially mixed under Kendall, they eventually improved, as Kendall led Everton to their most successful season ever winning the European Cup Winners' Cup and the First Division title in the 1984–85 season. Following success in the Charity Shield thrice and another League championship in 1986–87, Kendall resigned as Everton manager, to manage Spanish side Athletic Bilbao. He returned for two further spells in the 1990s (1990–1993 & 1997–1998) but without such success. Former Everton player and Oldham Athletic manager Joe Royle was appointed in 1994 following the disastrous reign of Mike Walker (1994 for 10 months) winning the FA Cup in the same season. Injury crises and players such as Andrei Kanchelskis being sold led to Royle's resignation in March 1997. Former Rangers manager, Walter Smith, took the position in August 1998, but he failed to transfer the success he had achieved in Scotland. With three bottom-half finishes in his first three seasons and facing relegation in the 2001–02 season, Smith was sacked. He was replaced by fellow Scot David Moyes who led the club back into European football, finishing fourth in the 2004–05 season. Under Moyes's 11-year managership, the club prospered, qualifying for the Champions League in 2005 and reaching the FA Cup final in 2009. He also signed young players like Séamus Coleman. However, the long-awaited trophy that his leadership deserved eluded him. Having stalled on contract renewal discussions, and following the announcement of Sir Alex Ferguson's retirement as manager of Manchester United at the end of the 2013 season, Moyes succeeded him at Old Trafford.

Moyes's replacement was Roberto Martínez, the club's first manager from outside Britain and Ireland. After three seasons, the last of which saw Everton return their worst home record in the club's 138-year history until the 2022–23 season, Martínez was sacked in May 2016 and replaced by Ronald Koeman a month later. Koeman was sacked in October 2017 after 16 months in the job following a 5–2 defeat to Arsenal that had dropped the club into the relegation zone. Sam Allardyce was named as Koeman's permanent replacement in November 2017. He was replaced at the end of 2017–18 by Marco Silva after finishing in 8th Silva was sacked in December 2019 following a 5–2 defeat to Liverpool, with Duncan Ferguson taking over as interim manager until the arrival of Carlo Ancelotti on 21 December 2019. Ancelotti would depart the club at the end of the 2020–21 season, returning to coach Real Madrid. On 30 June 2021, Rafael Benítez was named as Ancelotti's successor. He himself would be relieved of his duties on 16 January 2022 following a defeat to Norwich City which left Everton in 15th in the league. Benítez's six-and-a-half month tenure meant that he was the shortest-serving permanent manager in Everton's history. He was replaced temporarily with Duncan Ferguson as caretaker manager again that same day, playing and losing one game against Aston Villa, before being replaced by Frank Lampard on 31 January 2022. Lampard barely kept Everton up, but after a very poor first half the following season, combined with protests from fans against the board, he was sacked on 23 January 2023 with the Toffees sitting bottom alongside Southampton with only 15 points, he was replaced by Sean Dyche a week later on 30 January 2023. Dyche too was sacked almost two years later on 9 January 2025, after having only won 3 league games during the first half of the season. David Moyes returned as manager two days later on 11 January 2025.

== List of managers ==
As of match played 6 November 2026. Only professional, competitive matches are counted.

=== Key: ===
•=club secretary

*= caretaker manager

Table of Everton F.C. managers, including tenure and record
Manager	Nationality	From	To	Games	W	D	L	Win %
Alexander Nisbet•	England	August 1886	12 June 1888	4	1	2	1	25.00
William Edward Barclay•	Ireland	12 June 1888	23 August 1889	22	9	2	11	40.91
Dick Molyneux•	England	23 August 1889	11 September 1901	388	196	64	128	50.52
Will Cuff•	England	11 September 1901	3 December 1918	575	273	110	192	47.48
W.J. Sawyer•	England	August 1918	May 1919	16	7	3	6	43.75
Thomas H. McIntosh•	England	1 December 1919	29 October 1935	715	282	179	254	39.44
Theo Kelly•	England	30 October 1935	4 March 1946	170	73	34	63	42.94
Theo Kelly	England	5 March 1946	10 October 1948	103	39	19	45	37.86
Cliff Britton	England	11 October 1948	24 February 1956	336	124	91	121	36.90
Ian Buchan	Scotland	3 May 1956	25 September 1958	99	32	22	45	32.32
Johnny Carey	Ireland	20 October 1958	15 April 1961	122	51	22	49	41.80
Harry Catterick	England	17 April 1961	11 April 1973	592	275	156	161	46.45
Tom Eggleston*	England	12 April 1973	28 May 1973	6	1	2	3	16.67
Billy Bingham	Northern Ireland	28 May 1973	10 January 1977	172	64	55	53	37.21
Steve Burtenshaw*	England	10 January 1977	30 January 1977	4	0	2	2	0.00
Gordon Lee	England	30 January 1977	31 May 1981	234	92	72	70	39.32
Howard Kendall	England	1 June 1981	18 June 1987	338	183	78	77	54.14
Colin Harvey	England	19 June 1987	31 October 1990	176	75	52	49	42.61
Jimmy Gabriel*	Scotland	3 November 1990	3 November 1990	1	1	0	0	100.00
Howard Kendall	England	5 November 1990	4 December 1993	162	63	40	59	38.89
Jimmy Gabriel*	Scotland	8 December 1993	3 January 1994	7	0	1	6	0.00
Mike Walker	Wales	7 January 1994	8 November 1994	35	6	11	18	17.14
Joe Royle	England	10 November 1994	27 March 1997	118	47	36	35	39.83
Dave Watson*	England	5 April 1997	11 May 1997	7	1	3	3	14.29
Howard Kendall	England	27 June 1997	25 June 1998	42	11	13	18	26.19
Walter Smith	Scotland	1 July 1998	13 March 2002	168	53	50	65	31.55
David Moyes	Scotland	14 March 2002	30 June 2013	518	218	139	161	42.08
Roberto Martínez	Spain	5 July 2013	12 May 2016	143	61	39	43	42.66
David Unsworth*, Joe Royle*	England; England	15 May 2016	15 May 2016	1	1	0	0	100.00
Ronald Koeman	Netherlands	14 June 2016	23 October 2017	58	24	14	20	41.38
David Unsworth*	England	24 October 2017	30 November 2017	8	2	1	5	25.00
Sam Allardyce	England	30 November 2017	16 May 2018	26	10	7	9	38.46
Marco Silva	Portugal	31 May 2018	5 December 2019	60	24	12	24	40.00
Duncan Ferguson*	Scotland	5 December 2019	21 December 2019	4	1	3	0	25.00
Carlo Ancelotti	Italy	21 December 2019	1 June 2021	67	31	14	22	46.27
Rafael Benítez	Spain	30 June 2021	16 January 2022	22	7	5	10	31.82
Duncan Ferguson*	Scotland	16 January 2022	31 January 2022	1	0	0	1	0.00
Frank Lampard	England	31 January 2022	23 January 2023	44	12	8	24	27.27
Sean Dyche	England	30 January 2023	9 January 2025	84	26	26	32	30.95
Leighton Baines*, Séamus Coleman*	England; Ireland	9 January 2025	11 January 2025	1	1	0	0	100.00
David Moyes	Scotland	11 January 2025	Present	74	29	22	23	39.19

=== Managers by competitive honours won ===
Only professional, competitive honours are included. Only managers who won professional, competitive honours are included. Managers are ranked by honours won.

Table of Everton F.C. managers with list of honours won
Manager	Nationality	Tenure	FD	SD	FA	CS	WC	Total
Howard Kendall	England	1981–1987, 1990–1993, 1997–1998	2 (1984–85, 1986–87)	0	1 (1984)	3 (1984, 1985, 1986)	1 (1985)	7
Thomas H. McIntosh	England	1919–1935	2 (1927–28, 1931–32)	1 (1930–31)	1 (1933)	2 (1928)	0	6
Harry Catterick	England	1961–1973	2 (1962–63, 1969–70)	0	1 (1966)	2 (1963, 1970)	0	5
Will Cuff	England	1901–1918	1 (1914–15)	0	1 (1906)	0	0	2
Joe Royle	England	1994–1997, 2016	0	0	1 (1995)	1 (1995)	0	2
Dick Molyneux	England	1889–1901	1 (1890–91)	0	0	0	0	1
Theo Kelly	England	1935–1948	1 (1938–39)	0	0	0	0	1
Colin Harvey	England	1987–1990	0	0	0	1 (1987)	0	1
Total	—	—	9	1	5	9	1	25
