= Fred Wilkinson (footballer) =

English footballer

Personal information
- Date of birth: 1889
- Place of birth: Bury, Lancashire, England
- Height: 5 ft 7 in (1.70 m)
- Position: Left half

Senior career*
Years	Team	Apps	(Gls)
1908	St Augustines		
1909	Lancaster		
1910	Norwich City		
1911	Darlington		
1912–1913	Blackpool	15	(1)
1913–1919	Newport County		
1919–1920	Stalybridge Celtic		
1920–1921	Watford	37	(0)
1921	Stoke	3	(0)
1922	Bury St Edmunds		
Total		55	(1)
- * Club domestic league appearances and goals

Fred Wilkinson (born 1889) was an English footballer who played in the Football League for Blackpool, Watford and Stoke.

== Career ==
Wilkinson was born in Bury, Lancashire, and played football for Lancaster, Norwich City and Darlington before joining Football League side Blackpool in 1912.

Wilkinson made his debut for Blackpool in the opening league game of the 1912–13 campaign, a 1–1 draw at Grimsby Town on 3 September. He went on to make a further fourteen appearances, scoring once (in a 2–1 victory over Bury at Bloomfield Road on 14 September). His final start for the "Tangerines" occurred on 5 April, in a 5–1 defeat at Leicester Fosse on 29 March. He was replaced in the line-up by Wilf Gillow.

After leaving Blackpool he went on to play for Newport County and Stalybridge Celtic before re-entering league football with Watford where he spent the 1920–21 season. At the start of the 1921–22 season he joined Stoke and played in the first three matches before leaving Stoke. He went on to play for Suffolk side Bury St Edmunds.

== Career statistics ==
Appearances and goals by club, season and competition
Club	Season	League			FA Cup		Total	
Club	Season	Division	Apps	Goals	Apps	Goals	Apps	Goals
Blackpool	1912–13	Second Division	15	1	0	0	15	1
Watford	1920–21	Third Division South	37	0	2	0	39	0
Stoke	1921–22	Second Division	3	0	0	0	3	0
Career total			55	1	2	0	57	1
