= Eddie Latheron =

English footballer (1887-1917)

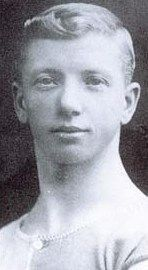

Personal information
- Full name: Edwin Gladstone Latheron
- Date of birth: 1887
- Place of birth: Carlin How, England
- Date of death: 14 October 1917 (aged 29–30)
- Place of death: Passchendaele salient, Belgium
- Position: Inside forward

Youth career
- South Bank Corinthians

Senior career*
Years	Team	Apps	(Gls)
–1906	Grangetown Athletic		
1906–1917	Blackburn Rovers	258	(94)
1915–1916	→ Blackpool (guest)	0	(0)

International career
1913–1914	England	2	(1)
- * Club domestic league appearances and goals

Edwin Gladstone Latheron (1887 – 14 October 1917) was an English footballer who played as an inside forward for Blackburn Rovers, who won the Football League title in 1912 and 1914. He also made two appearances for England in 1913 and 1914. He was killed at the Battle of Passchendaele in World War I.

== Playing career ==
Latheron was born at Carlin How, near Middlesbrough and after playing for South Bank Corinthians he joined Grangetown Athletic, playing in the Northern League. He was discovered by Blackburn Rovers in 1906 playing for Grangetown against Blackburn Crosshill in an FA Amateur Cup tie. Rovers had originally gone to watch another player but it was Latheron who caught their eye and Rovers' manager Robert Middleton paid £25 to bring him to Ewood Park.

Due to his complexion and red hair, Latheron was known affectionately as "Pinkie" on the terraces.

Latheron soon became a regular selection at inside-left and in 1907–08 he was joint top scorer with nine goals from 27 appearances as Rovers struggled, finishing in 14th place in the table. The following season, Middleton appointed Bob Holmes, the former Preston North End star as trainer. This appointment had a great impact on the team as they obtain fourth place in the table, with Latheron scoring ten goals.

Blackburn continued their good form the following season and by October 1909 they became leaders of the First Division. They lost their position in January 1910 and finally finished in third place behind Aston Villa and Liverpool with Latheron again scoring ten goals. In 1910–11, Blackburn struggled away from home, with only one win, and, although they won 12 games at home, they could only finish in mid-table. They did, however, have a good run in the FA Cup, reaching the FA Cup semi-finals where they went down 3–0 to eventual winners Bradford City; Latheron scored three goals in the cup run, including two against Southend United in the first round.

The 1911–12 season began badly with Blackburn Rovers losing two of the first three games. Blackburn's form gradually improved and the team went on an unbeaten run that lasted three months, which took them to the top of the league. Despite being defeated by Bolton Wanderers and Arsenal, Blackburn went on another good run and by the end of the season they had three more points than main challengers, Everton. This was Blackburn's first Football League title. Despite missing a substantial part of the season through injury, Latheron was one of the stars of the team, contributing seven goals, including vital goals against Everton and Oldham Athletic in the final weeks of the season.

For the 1912–13 season, the team was undefeated until December, followed by a run of five successive defeats. In an attempt to regain the championship, Middleton broke the British transfer record by buying Danny Shea from West Ham United for £2,000. Shea's twelve goals were not enough, and Blackburn finished fifth that season, with Latheron the club's top scorer on 14.

His form earned him a call up to the England team for the British Home Championship match against Wales played at Ashton Gate, Bristol on 17 March 1913, when he was joined by his Rovers teammates, Bob Crompton, Joseph Hodkinson and Billy Bradshaw. Latheron scored England's second goal in a 4–3 victory. His second international appearance came at Ayresome Park, Middlesbrough the following February, in a 3–0 defeat by Ireland with two goals from Liverpool's Bill Lacey as Ireland claimed the British Home Championship outright for the first time.

In the league, Rovers took the Football League title for the second time in 1913–14 with a seven-point margin over Aston Villa, thanks in no small part to Danny Shea's 27 goals with Latheron contributing 13.

Despite the outbreak of the First World War, league football continued in England for a further season, and in 1914–15, Blackburn finished in third place behind Everton and Oldham Athletic. Rovers scored 83 league goals in the season, with top scorer Percy Dawson on 20 goals, with Latheron scoring 17.

In his nine league seasons at Ewood Park, Latheron played 258 games, scoring 94 goals.

For the 1915–16 season, Latheron was one of several Blackburn Rovers players who guested for Blackpool, for whom he was top scorer with 16 goals in wartime leagues.

Latheron returned to Blackburn for the 1916–17 season and played his final game for Blackburn Rovers on 17 March 1917. Including wartime matches, Latheron made a total of 303 appearances for Blackburn, scoring 120 goals. He remains the 4th highest scorer in Blackburn Rovers' history.

== Death and memorial ==
After the cessation of League football, Latheron enlisted, joining the Royal Field Artillery as a gunner, and within a week of his last match for Blackburn Rovers, he was on the Front. He was killed on 14 October 1917, aged 29 at the Battle of Passchendaele, and was buried in the military cemetery at Vlamertinghe near to the town of Ypres, Belgium. He left behind a widow, Bertha, and a son, Walter.

After Latheron's death, the Liverpool Echo received a letter from Alex McPhie, a former teammate of Latheron who was also fighting on the Western Front. He wrote:

A shell burst near their dugout and the splinters, passing through the opening, killed Latheron and another gunner. Latheron was happy and strong and was a tremendous worker, and if anybody has done his bit in this war it is he. We are going out of action tomorrow, and intended to have a good time.

In October 2007, a group of Belgian fans of Blackburn Rovers honoured the 90th anniversary of Latheron's death by a ceremony at his grave.

== Honours ==
Blackburn Rovers

- Football League champions: 1911–12, 1913–14

== See also ==
- List of one-club men
