= Jimmy Kidd =

English footballer

James Kidd
Personal information
- Full name: James Kidd
- Place of birth: Darlington, England
- Height: 5 ft 11 in (1.80 m)
- Position: Goalkeeper

Senior career*
| Years | Team | Apps | (Gls) |
- Darlington
| 1906–1910 | Spennymoor United | | |
| 1910–1915 | Blackpool | 61 | (0) |
| 1915 | Bolton Wanderers | 9 | (0) |
| 1919–1921 | Derby County | 20 | (0) |
| – | Fleetwood | | |
| Total | | 90 | (0) |
- * Club domestic league appearances and goals

James Kidd was a footballer who played in the Football League as a goalkeeper for Blackpool, Bolton Wanderers and Derby County.

== Early life and career ==
Kidd was born in Darlington, County Durham. He played for Northern League club Darlington and spent four years with Spennymoor United (two in the Northern League, two in the North-Eastern) before joining Football League Second Division club Blackpool in July 1910.

== Blackpool ==
Kidd made his debut for Blackpool late in the 1910-11 season, in a goalless draw with West Bromwich Albion at Bloomfield Road on 8 April. He took over from William Fiske, who up until that point had been present for 72 consecutive League games, for the four remaining games of the season that followed.

Fiske returned to the team for the first 23 League games of the 1911-12 campaign. Hoad took over for another goalless draw, this time at Bradford City on 6 February. He also played in the five games that followed, four of which were losses.

Kidd (16 League appearances) and Fiske (22) shared the goalkeeping role in 1912-13, before the latter made it his own again in 1913-14.

Fiske left the club at the end of the season, allowing Kidd to become the first-choice 'keeper for 1914-15. He played in the first 30 League games before leaving the club for Bolton Wanderers. Two other goalkeepers — James Mitchell and Fred Thompson — played for Blackpool in the eight remaining games of the season.

== Later career ==
Kidd signed for Bolton Wanderers of the First Division in March 1915, and made nine appearances before the Football League was abandoned for the duration of the First World War. On the eve of its resumption in September 1919, he joined Derby County, for whom he played 20 First Division matches over three seasons.
