= Richard Cahill =

English footballer

Personal information
- Place of birth: Newcastle upon Tyne, England
- Position: Outside right

Senior career*
Years	Team	Apps	(Gls)
- Houghton Rovers
1911	Blackpool	21	(0)
- Houghton Rovers
- * Club domestic league appearances and goals

Richard Cahill was an English professional footballer. An outside right, he played in the Football League for just one club, Blackpool. He played 21 League games for the club during the 1911–12 campaign.
