= 1916–17 Blackpool F.C. season =

English football club season

Blackpool F.C.
1916–17 season
- Manager: None
- Football League, Lancashire Section: 16th (Principal Competition)
- Football League, Lancashire Section, Group C: 10th (Subsidiary Competition)
- FA Cup: Competition suspended
- Top goalscorer: League: All: Williamson (10)
- Highest home attendance: 6,000
- Lowest home attendance: 1,000
Home colours

The 1916–17 season was Blackpool F.C.'s second season in special wartime football during World War I. They competed in two Football League competitions spread over the full season — the Lancashire Section, Northern Group Principal Competition, for thirty games, and then in the Lancashire Section, Group C, Subsidiary Competition, for a further six games. The club finished in last place, 16th, in the principal competition and 10th in the subsidiary competition. Williamson was the club's top scorer, with ten goals (six in the principal competition, three in the subsidiary and one in other games). Harry Hampton, who scored over 200 goals for Aston Villa between 1904 and 1920, briefly played for Blackpool this season, scoring eight goals in seven league games.

The FA Cup was suspended for the duration of the war.

== Background ==
For Blackpool, the second wartime season was quite different from the first. With the war escalating, the club's own players were not able to play as much for Blackpool. In addition, Blackburn Rovers decided to play in the league which meant that their players, who had played for Blackpool the previous season, would no longer be available. Blackpool often had to rely on finding players at the last minute for matches; therefore, unlike the first season, Blackpool rarely put out the same side in consecutive matches. Staff and recovering patients from the King's Lancashire Medical Convalescent Hospital (KLMCH) and staff from the Royal Army Medical Corps Depot (RAMC), both based at Squires Gate, provided players throughout the season.

== Football League Group A ==
=== Lancashire Section, Northern Group Principal Competition ===
The Principal competition for the 1916–17 season consisted of sixteen teams, two more than in the 1915–16 season with the addition of Blackburn Rovers and Port Vale:

- Blackpool
- Blackburn Rovers
- Bolton Wanderers
- Bury
- Burnley
- Everton
- Liverpool
- Manchester City
- Manchester United
- Oldham Athletic
- Port Vale
- Preston North End
- Rochdale
- Southport Central
- Stockport County
- Stoke City

Blackpool began the campaign on 2 September 1916, with a home match against Preston North End. The Seasiders team contained only six players who had played for the club in the previous season. The team included Jim Simmons, a Sheffield United player who was on honeymoon in Blackpool. Blackpool won the match 5–1 in front of a crowd of 3,000. By the third game, Blackpool had already used 17 different players, whereas they had used only 19 players throughout the whole of the 1915-16 season. The often-makeshift side suffered five consecutive defeats between 7 October and 4 November before a 1–1 draw at home to Bury on 11 November. However, a week later they lost 11–1 away to Port Vale. Although it is the club's heaviest defeat, it does not count in official records, being a wartime-season game.

The club continued to struggle to field a team, and against Stoke City on 25 November began the game with only nine players. Two soldiers were called in at the last minute to join the game, and the side then managed to get a 1–1 draw. Private Williamson, a soldier from Merseyside, made his debut against Oldham Athletic on 2 December, and he went on to become the club's top scorer this season.

The next win, only the second of the season following the opening day victory, came on 23 December with a 2–1 home victory over Blackburn Rovers, with Williamson scoring both goals. They won just four more games throughout the remainder of the principal-competition season, suffering further heavy defeats — 7–0 to Burnley on 30 December, when they had only nine players and had to borrow two players from their hosts, and 6–0 to Stockport County on 10 February 1917. However, they ended the season with a 9–0 win over Oldham Athletic on 17 March (including four goals from Hampton). They still finished bottom of the table with 19 points from thirty games. Liverpool were the Principal Competition champions.

Pos	Team	Pld	W	D	L	GF	GA	GR	Pts
16	Blackpool	30	6	7	17	44	80	0.550	19

=== Lancashire Section, Group C, Subsidiary Competition ===
For the Subsidiary Competition, the Lancashire League was divided into four groups, unlike the 1915-16 season when there were two groups with six teams each (Northern and Southern). The games played were again though amalgamated at the end of the season to give a composite table.

Blackpool were placed in Group C which contained four teams:

- Blackburn Rovers
- Blackpool
- Burnley
- Preston North End

Blackpool's first match in the subsidiary competition was on Christmas Day 1916, even though the Principal Competition was mid-season. They began with a defeat at Burnley. The next match was not until 31 March 1917, away at Preston North End, and another defeat, this time 2–1. Blackpool won two of their six games, both against Blackburn Rovers, beating them 4–1 at Bloomfield Road on 7 April and 3–2 at Ewood Park in the last game of the season on 21 April. In the combined Subsidiary Competition table Blackpool finished 10th, with Rochdale emerging as champions.

Pos	Team	Pld	W	D	L	GF	GA	GR	Pts
10	Blackpool	6	2	1	3	10	12	0.833	5

== Summary ==
In the Principal Competition, Blackpool used 54 different players, with a further eight players appearing in the Subsidiary Competition. Booth made the most appearances with 31 (28 in the Principal Competition and three in the Subsidiary Competition), missing just five league games all season. Connor was next with 30 league appearances (24 in the Principal Competition and six in the Subsidiary Competition), followed by Carlisle with 26 (25 in the Principal Competition and one in the Subsidiary Competition) and Bainbridge, with 24 (23 in the Principal Competition and one in the Subsidiary Competition).

== Transfers ==
=== In ===
Date	Player	From	Fee

=== Out ===
Date	Player	From	Fee
