= 1917–18 Blackpool F.C. season =

English football club season

Blackpool F.C.
1917–18 season
- Manager: None
- Football League, Lancashire Section: 12th (Principal Competition)
- Football League, Lancashire Section, Group C: 5th (Subsidiary Competition)
- FA Cup: Competition suspended
- Top goalscorer: League: All: Thomas Hunter (8)
- Highest home attendance: 4,000
- Lowest home attendance: 500
Home colours

The 1917–18 season was Blackpool F.C.'s third season in special wartime football during World War I. They competed in two Football League competitions spread over the full season — the Lancashire Section, Northern Group Principal Competition, for thirty games, and then in the Lancashire Section, Group C, Subsidiary Competition, for a further six games. The club finished in 12th place in the principal competition and fifth in the subsidiary competition. Thomas Hunter was the club's top scorer, with eight goals (five in the principal competition and three in the subsidiary).

The FA Cup was suspended for the duration of the war.

== Background ==
As with the 1916–17 season, Blackpool had to rely on a small nucleus of players supplemented by soldiers stationed in the town and the occasional league players as guests to make up the numbers. Again, they had to rely on staff from the Royal Army Medical Corps Depot (RAMC) based at Squires Gate. Edgar Chadwick, who had played for Blackpool in the 1904–05 season after a successful career at Everton, made two appearances for them again at the age of 48. George Beel, who went on to score 178 goals in 316 league games for Burnley, scored two goals in eleven appearances. Two RAMC men, Albert Moorcroft and Edmund Berry, who made their debut during this period, went on to sign professional terms with the club, as did Thomas Hunter, who played in the latter part of the season. Fred Pagnam, who had played for the club before the war, appeared in one Subsidiary Competition match.

== Football League Group A ==
=== Lancashire Section, Northern Group Principal Competition ===
The Principal competition for the 1917–18 season consisted of sixteen teams, with the same teams as the 1916–17 season:

- Blackpool
- Blackburn Rovers
- Bolton Wanderers
- Bury
- Burnley
- Everton
- Liverpool
- Manchester City
- Manchester United
- Oldham Athletic
- Port Vale
- Preston North End
- Rochdale
- Southport Central
- Stockport County
- Stoke City

Blackpool began the campaign on 1 September 1917, with a home match against Oldham Athletic, which they won 3–2, with all three goals coming from Kirrage, a soldier based at the RAMC depot. The Seasiders also fielded a new full back partnership of Dunn with Horace Fairhurst, both based at the RAMC Depot. Fairhurst would go on to sign permanently for the club after the war, before his death in 1921.

Blackpool lost just one of their first five matches, with three guest players scoring. However, they then went on a five-game losing streak from 6 October, when they lost 3–1 at Stockport County, to 3 November when they were beaten at home 6–0 by Liverpool. The Seasiders still struggled to raise a full team, and against Manchester United at Old Trafford on 8 December they could only field ten players, having to borrow a player from the home team. On 5 January 1918, Blackpool beat Everton 1–0 at home, but followed this up with a run of six defeats and one draw, including a 7–2 defeat at Everton, a 4–0 loss to Port Vale, and a 5–0 loss to Bolton Wanderers, in which Edgar Chadwick made his second appearance of the season. Results started to improve, and they ended the season with a run of six matches undefeated (four wins and two draws), including a 4–1 win over Blackburn Rovers, with Thomas Hunter scoring all four goals. By this time, Moorcroft and Fairhurst had "gone away on the draft" and the club once again were having to find new players, even though the season was drawing to a close.

For the final match of the Principal Competition, at home to Burnley on 29 March, the Blackpool Committee stated that they had to rely entirely on local soldiers, and even then they could only announce the team just before kick-off. Blackpool won the match 1–0, with Hunter scoring his sixth goal in four games.

| Pos | Team | Pld | W | D | L | GF | GA | GR | Pts |
|---|---|---|---|---|---|---|---|---|---|
| 12 | Blackpool | 30 | 9 | 6 | 15 | 38 | 67 | 0.567 | 24 |

=== Lancashire Section, Group C, Subsidiary Competition ===
For the Subsidiary Competition, the Lancashire League was again divided into four, with the games played amalgamated at the end of the season to give a composite table.

Blackpool were again placed in Group C which contained four teams:

- Blackburn Rovers
- Blackpool
- Burnley
- Preston North End

Blackpool again had to rely on soldiers stationed in the town for the Subsidiary Competition. The first two matches were held in mid-season during the Principal Competition. The home and away fixtures against Burnley were played with Blackpool losing at Turf Moor 3–1 on 24 November, and winning the return fixture 5–1 at Bloomfield Road on 1 December, when Edgar Chadwick made his return to the side at the age of 48. They won both matches against Blackburn Rovers: 2–0 at home on 30 March 1918, and 4–1 at Ewood Park on 6 April. They ended the season with the two games against Preston North End, losing 3–2 at home on 13 April then winning the final match of the season at Deepdale 4–1 on 20 April. In the combined Subsidiary Competition table Blackpool finished sixth, with Liverpool emerging as champions.

| Pos | Team | Pld | W | D | L | GF | GA | GR | Pts |
|---|---|---|---|---|---|---|---|---|---|
| 6 | Blackpool | 6 | 4 | 0 | 2 | 18 | 9 | 2.000 | 8 |

== Summary ==
As with the previous season, Blackpool used a lot of personnel throughout the season, with a total of 53 different players being used in both competitions. Harold Keenan made the most appearances, with 34 (28 in the Principal Competition and six in the Subsidiary Competition). Dunn was next with 32 league appearances (27 in the Principal Competition and five in the Subsidiary Competition), followed by Horace Fairhurst with 27 (25 in the Principal Competition and two in the Subsidiary Competition).

== Military international ==
On 2 January 1918, Bloomfield Road hosted a military international between England and Scotland. The match ended in a 1–1 draw, with a number of the RAMC men who played for Blackpool appearing in the match. For England, Monaghan (who had just started playing as Blackpool's goalkeeper), Bates, Kinsella, Grice and Moorcroft (who scored the English goal) all played. Robb and Sperrin, together with Englishman Horace Fairhurst, turned out for the Scots.

== Transfers ==
=== In ===
| Date | Player | From | Fee |

=== Out ===
| Date | Player | From | Fee |
