= Bert Yarnall =

English footballer

Personal information
- Full name: Herbert George Yarnall
- Date of birth: 1892
- Place of birth: Goole, England
- Date of death: 1943 (aged 50–51)
- Positions: Inside left; centre forward

Senior career*
Years	Team	Apps	(Gls)
- Kidsgrove Wellington
1914	Blackpool	9	(1)
1916–1917	Airdrieonians	46	(45)
1917–1918	Clydebank	14	(4)
1918–1919	Dumbarton	14	(5)
1920	Reading	5	(1)
- Oswestry Town
- * Club domestic league appearances and goals

Herbert George Yarnall (1892–1943) was an English professional footballer who played as a forward in the Scottish League for Airdrieonians, Clydebank and Dumbarton. He was the top scorer in the Scottish League Division One during the 1916–17 season, with 39 goals. Yarnall also played in the Football League for Blackpool and Reading.

== Career statistics ==
Appearances and goals by club, season and competition
Club	Season	League			National Cup		Other		Total	
Club	Season	Division	Apps	Goals	Apps	Goals	Apps	Goals	Apps	Goals
Blackpool	1914–15	Second Division	9	1	0	0	—		9	1
Airdrieonians	1916–17	Scottish Division One	33	39	—		—		33	39
Airdrieonians	1917–18	Scottish Division One	13	6	—		—		13	6
Airdrieonians	Total		46	45	—		—		46	45
Clydebank	1917–18	Scottish Division One	14	4	—		—		14	4
Dumbarton	1918–19	Scottish Division One	14	5	—		0	0	14	5
Career total			83	55	0	0	0	0	83	55

== Honours ==
- Scottish League Division One top scorer: 1916–17
