= Danny Shea =

English footballer

- Shea at West Ham United in 1912

Personal information
- Full name: Daniel Harold Shea
- Date of birth: 6 November 1887
- Place of birth: Wapping, England
- Date of death: 25 December 1960 (aged 73)
- Place of death: Wapping, England
- Height: 5 ft 7 in (1.70 m)
- Position: Inside forward

Senior career*
| Years | Team | Apps | (Gls) |
| 1907–1913 | West Ham United | 179 | (111) |
| 1913–1920 | Blackburn Rovers | 97 | (61) |
| 1920 | West Ham United | 16 | (1) |
| 1920–1923 | Fulham | 100 | (23) |
| 1923–1924 | Coventry City | 60 | (11) |
| 1924–1926 | Clapton Orient | 33 | (8) |
| 1926–1927 | Sheppey United | | |
| Total | | 485 | (215) |

International career
| 1914 | England | 2 | (0) |
- * Club domestic league appearances and goals

Daniel Harold Shea (6 November 1887 – 25 December 1960) was an English footballer who played as an inside-forward.

== Football career ==
=== West Ham United ===
Born in Wapping, London, Shea played for the Builders Arms pub in Stratford, as well as other local teams Pearl United and Manor Park Albion, when he was discovered by West Ham United boss Charlie Paynter. He joined the Hammers in 1907, making his debut as an amateur against Norwich City in a December Southern League game. He was the club's top scorer for four consecutive seasons between 1908 and 1912, His 15 Southern League goals in were enough to record a fifth season as the club's top league scorer in 1912–13; a recently recruited George Hilsdon claimed the main honour with his four FA Cup goals taking him to 17 in all competitions. Now favoured to Billy Grassam, the 1908–09 season saw 20 goals in 49 appearances, including all four in a game against Plymouth Argyle, and a hat-trick in a 4–2 win over Swindon Town. His best was yet to come though; in the 1909–10 season, Shea scored 31 goals in 43 appearances. The following season, he managed 28 goals in 39 appearances, including four against Southend United on 31 December 1910. He scored twice in an FA Cup game against Nottingham Forest on 14 January 1911, although he admitted afterwards that he had taken full advantage of the dense fog: "I punched both goals into the net in full view of several opponents".

In 1911–12, Shea managed another two hat-tricks – against Brentford in a 7–4 win on 21 October 1911, and Norwich City in a 4–0 win on 5 April 1912 – to make it 24 goals in 41 appearances that season. He formed a great partnership with Fred Harrison and together they scored 40 goals in the season. As Shea's stock continued to rise, other clubs could not fail to notice the qualities of the skilful ball player and prolific scorer, and he was described by one football writer as having an "uncanny ability to pass to himself". He transferred to Blackburn Rovers halfway through the 1912–13 season for a then-record fee of £2000. Despite this, he still managed to appear as the east London club's top scorer for that season, totalling 15 goals in 15 league and cup games.

=== Blackburn Rovers ===
His time at Blackburn was interrupted by World War I, but he scored regularly and his 27 goals (together with Eddie Latheron's 13) in 1913–14 helped the club win the Football League Division One championship that season. He also gained two caps for England and represented the Football League while at the club. During the war, he returned to West Ham and made 73 London Combination appearances for the club and scored a total of 63 goals, including a run of 32 goals in 32 appearances. He also played for Birmingham and Fulham, where he scored 19 goals in 36 games. In January 1919, he made one appearance for Celtic and so renowned was Shea that Patsy Gallacher was moved to outside-right to accommodate him. He also appeared for Nottingham Forest, where he was part of the team that beat Everton 1–0 on 17 May 1919 in the second leg of the Victory Shield, contested between the winners of the Lancashire and Midland sections of the Football League.

After the War, Shea continued to play for Blackburn until 1920 and gained a further two England caps in Victory International games against Scotland.

=== Later career ===
He then returned for another spell at Upton Park, but only managed 16 appearances and one goal before moving to Fulham, where he scored 24 in 107 league and cup appearances. Teammate Peter Gavigan once said of him: "At Fulham in 1920–21, I had as my inside-right one of the greatest ball artists who has ever played for England – Danny Shea. His manipulation was bewildering. He was the Prince of Partners', the intellectual footballer". He went on to play for Coventry City and spent two seasons at Clapton Orient, before signing for Kent League club Sheppey United in October 1926.

== Later life and coaching career ==
After his retirement, Shea worked as a docker and, in 1927, was working as a publican with his sister in Wapping. On 13 August 1928, he joined Swiss club Winterthur as coach, returning to England to join Woking as a trainer on 26 September 1929. He later ran a sub-post office in West Ham.
