= Levy Thorpe =

English footballer

Personal information
- Full name: Levy Thorpe
- Date of birth: 18 November 1889
- Place of birth: Seaham, England
- Date of death: 1935 (aged 45–46)
- Height: 5 ft 7 in (1.70 m)
- Position: Wing half

Senior career*
Years	Team	Apps	(Gls)
1907–1908	Seaham Albion		
1908–1909	Seaham White Star		
1909–1911	Seaham Harbour		
1911–1913	Blackpool	92	(1)
1913–1920	Burnley	72	(3)
1920–1922	Blackburn Rovers	85	(1)
1922–1924	Lincoln City	69	(9)
1924–1925	Rochdale	31	(0)
1926	Farnworth Town		
Total		349	(14)
- * Club domestic league appearances and goals

Levy Thorpe (18 November 1889 – 1935) was an English professional footballer who played as a wing half. He made 98 appearances for Blackpool, all of which were in consecutive games. 92 of these were in the Football League; the other six were in the FA Cup.

== Career ==
Thorpe made his debut for Blackpool late in the 1910–11 campaign, in a 2–0 victory against Leicester Fosse at Bloomfield Road on 29 March 1911. He went on to appear in their six remaining League games, beginning a long run of consecutive appearances for the club.

The following season, 1911–12, he was an ever-present, appearing in the number-4 jersey in all of Blackpool's 42 League and FA Cup games. He also scored his first and only goal for the club. It came in a 2–0 victory over Nottingham Forest at Bloomfield Road on 23 March 1912.

The ever-present record was preserved the following 1912–13 season, at the end of which he had made 89 consecutive appearances for the Tangerines.

In 1913–14, Thorpe appeared in the first 9 League games, continuing his appearance streak to 98 games, before being sold to Lancashire rivals Burnley. However, during World War I, he returned to Blackpool as a guest player.

== Personal life ==
Thorpe served as a private in the Loyal North Lancashire Regiment during the First World War.
