= Edmund Berry =

English footballer

Personal information
- Place of birth: England
- Position: Outside left

Senior career*
Years	Team	Apps	(Gls)
1920	Blackpool	5	(1)
- * Club domestic league appearances and goals

Edmund Berry was an English footballer. He played professionally for Blackpool in the early 20th century.

Berry made his debut for Blackpool late in the 1919–20 campaign, in a 1–1 draw with Wolves at Bloomfield Road on 13 March. He played in four other League matches before the end of the season, and scored the only goal in the victory at Hull City on 20 March, helping the Seasiders to a fourth-place finish in Division Two. He left the club at the end of the season.
