= Theo Kelly =

English football manager (1896–1964)

Louis Alford Theodore Kelly (17 January 1896 – 30 April 1964) was manager of Everton Football Club from 1939 to 1948.

== Biography ==
Kelly was born in Liverpool on 17 January 1896. His father, Louis Theophilus Kelly, was Manx. His mother, Lilian Mabel May, was Cornish. Theo Kelly married Emily Gladys Wilson at Walton Methodist Chapel, County Road, Liverpool in 1925. He joined Everton as a coach in 1929. He is best known for designing the club's official crest featuring the Everton Lock-Up (Prince Rupert's Tower) in 1938, and for becoming the club's first appointed manager in 1946.

== Pre-war ==
Everton were one of the last league teams to appoint a manager. Before this, the team selection was made by coaches and boardroom members. Kelly had been club secretary before his appointment as manager in May 1939 and had been closely involved in team matters, so there is some dispute when he actually took over. Kelly was ambitious and a self-publicist, manoeuvring himself into the position after the death of his successful predecessor, Thomas H. McIntosh. While he was club secretary Kelly devised the club badge and motto.

The First Division of 1938-39 had already been won by Everton by the time that Kelly was appointed as full-time manager. The League was then suspended for seven seasons during the war though some matches were played with Kelly in charge.

== Post-war ==
After the war Kelly disagreed with Joe Mercer. Kelly accused Mercer of "not trying" in an international against Scotland, but in reality Mercer had sustained a severe cartilage injury. Even after consulting an orthopaedic specialist, Kelly refused to believe him and Mercer had to pay for the surgery himself (after fourteen years with the club). Understandably upset, Mercer moved in 1946 for £9,000 to Arsenal, although he commuted from Liverpool. Theo Kelly brought Mercer's boots to the transfer negotiations to prevent Mercer having a reason to go back to say goodbye to the other players at Everton.

Kelly was also unable to persuade Tommy Lawton to stay and he attempted to sell T. G. Jones to A.S. Roma to raise £15,000, but exchange control prevented the transfer. Many players saw Kelly as a remote, autocratic and petty figure. Dixie Dean said that the main reason for leaving Everton in 1937 was Kelly. Kelly distrusted players bought on the transfer market and so the playing resources were quickly depleted.

After two poor seasons (finishing 10th and 14th) and a poor start to the 1948–49 season in which Everton finished 18th, Kelly resigned as manager in September 1948 and reverted to being club secretary. Cliff Britton replaced him as manager, though relegation in 1950/51 can be partly traced back to Kelly's period as manager. Kelly was better known for his administrative skills and to his credit he left the club in a better financial state.
