= James Dumper =

English footballer

Personal information
- Position: Outside right

Senior career*
Years	Team	Apps	(Gls)
1919	Blackpool	1	(0)
- * Club domestic league appearances and goals

James Dumper was a professional footballer. An outside right, he played in the Football League for Blackpool.
