= John Gunter (football manager) =

- Known for: Secretary-manager of Middlesbrough F.C. from 1909 to 1910

John Gunter was secretary-manager of Middlesbrough F.C. from February 1909 to June 1910.

Following the departure of Andy Aitken to Leicester Fosse, Boro were left without a manager in name for sixteen months, and so the responsibilities of management fell to secretary John Gunter.

Gunter joined the board in 1893, after Middlesbrough had reverted to amateur status. When he took over first team affairs in 1909, he guided the team from mid-table to finish ninth. However, his reign included heavy defeats, one being 7–3 to Bradford at home on Christmas Day and a 5–0 defeat to Bury at home six weeks later.

He stepped down in June 1910 to be replaced by Andy Walker.
