= Horace Fairhurst =

English footballer

Personal information
- Date of birth: 2 June 1893
- Place of birth: Bolton, England
- Date of death: 7 January 1921 (aged 27)
- Position: Defender

Senior career*
Years	Team	Apps	(Gls)
–1919	Darwen		
1919–1921	Blackpool	47	(0)
- * Club domestic league appearances and goals

Horace Fairhurst (2 June 1893 – 7 January 1921) was an English professional footballer. He played as a defender.

After playing for Darwen for a number of years, Fairhurst joined fellow Lancashire club Blackpool in May 1919 after previously playing for them during the 1916–17 and 1917–18 World War I wartime seasons.

== Career ==
Fairhurst first played for Blackpool in the 1917–18 wartime season, on 1 September 1917 against Oldham Athletic, while he was serving at the Royal Army Medical Corps Depot in the town. He made a total of 27 appearances for the club that season. He returned to the club on 8 February 1919, in a 1–1 draw at Burnley and made a total of ten appearances for the Seasiders that season. The club then signed him in May 1919.

He made his official league debut at left-back on 8 September 1919, in a 6–0 home win over Lincoln City in the 1919–20 season. He made 27 league appearances as Blackpool finished fourth in Division Two. His nine appearances for the reserve team won him a Central League championship medal.

In his twentieth league appearance of the 1920–21 season, on 27 December 1920, Fairhurst suffered a head injury during Blackpool's single-goal win over Barnsley at Oakwell. At one point it looked as though he would recover, and he reported for training at the Balmoral Hotel for the FA Cup tie at Darlington on 8 January; however, he was deemed "not recovered sufficiently to run the risk of playing him". He was initially named in the Blackpool team to face Notts County on New Year's Day, but he had "a touch of gastritis" and did not travel. He died at home on 7 January 1921 as a result of the injury, with the club stating, "We have lost one of the best backs in England". He was buried at Tonge Cemetery on 13 January. He had made just short of 50 league appearances for the Seasiders. On 4 May, Blackpool played a benefit match against Preston North End with the proceeds to go to his widow and to the children of his partner at full-back, Bert Tulloch, whose wife had died the same weekend as Fairhurst.

== See also ==
- List of association footballers who died while playing
