= Thomas H. McIntosh =

English footballer and secretary manager

Thomas McIntosh
Personal information
- Full name: Thomas Herbert McInotsh
- Date of birth: 24 February 1879
- Place of birth: Sedgefield, County Durham, England
- Date of death: 29 October 1935 (aged 56)
- Place of death: Liverpool, England

Senior career*
Years	Team	Apps	(Gls)
1895–1902	Darlington		

Managerial career
- 1902–1911: Darlington (secretary)
- 1911–1919: Middlesbrough (secretary)
- 1919–1935: Everton (secretary)
- * Club domestic league appearances and goals

Thomas Herbert McIntosh (24 February 1879 – 29 October 1935) was secretary manager of Darlington, Middlesbrough and Everton.

== Biography ==
He played for Darlington before becoming secretary manager in 1902. He moved to Middlesbrough nine years later where new chairman Philip Bach was charged with rebuilding the club following the match-fixing scandal involving the previous chairman Thomas Gibson-Poole and manager Andy Walker. He helped the club achieve their highest ever league position - third in the first division - but with a potential championship team taking shape his plans were interrupted by the outbreak of World War I. During the war, Boro released their players and closed down, while Ayresome Park was used as a munitions store.

McIntosh joined the Teesside Pioneers, a battalion of Alexandra, The Princess of Wales's Own (Yorkshire Regiment), formed in Middlesbrough in December 1914. He saw active service in France as a sergeant. Was commissioned and became 2nd Lieutenant 29 January 1917. When the war ended he guided Boro to the Northern Victory League title and prepared the club for a return to normality. In December 1919, however, an offer came in for his services from Everton and he left with the blessing of the Boro board.

At Everton he was most famous for spotting and signing Dixie Dean. Under McIntosh's guidance Everton won the FA Cup and twice won the Football League Championship. He died from cancer in October 1935, and was eventually replaced as secretary manager at Everton by Theo Kelly.

== Honours ==
=== As a secretary manager ===
Everton

- First Division Title winner: 1927–28, 1931–32
- Second Division Title winner: 1930–31
- FA Charity Shield winner: 1928, 1932
- FA Cup winner: 1933
- FA Charity Shield runner-up: 1933

== Managerial statistics ==
Team	From	To	Record					
Team	From	To	G	W	L	D	Win %	
Darlington (secretary)	1902	1911	142	60	23	59	42.25	
Middlesbrough (secretary)	1911	1919	179	88	49	56	38.55	
Everton (secretary)	August 1919	May 1935	719	286	254	179	39.8	
Total				1,054	434	326	294	41.18

== See also ==
- List of English football championship winning managers
