= Eugene O'Doherty (footballer) =

English footballer

Personal information
- Full name: Eugene F.J. O'Doherty
- Date of birth: 1896
- Place of birth: Ballaghaderreen, Ireland
- Position: Inside forward

Senior career*
Years	Team	Apps	(Gls)
1919–1920	Blackpool	5	(0)
1920–1921	Leeds United	0	(0)
1920	Fleetwood		
1920	Wigan Borough		
1921–1922	Ashton National		
1922	Halifax Town	0	(0)
1922–1923	Blackpool	1	(0)
1923–1924	Walsall	18	(2)
1924–1925	Morecambe		
1925	Clitheroe		
Total		24	(2)
- * Club domestic league appearances and goals

Eugene F.J. O'Doherty (1896–unknown) was an Irish footballer who played in the Football League for Blackpool and Walsall and made two FA Cup appearances for Leeds United.
