= Tom Buchan (footballer) =

English footballer

Personal information
- Full name: Thomas Murray Buchan
- Date of birth: September 1889
- Place of birth: Plumstead, England
- Date of death: 1952 (aged 62–63)
- Height: 5 ft 9 1/2 in (1.77 m)
- Position: Left half

Senior career*
Years	Team	Apps	(Gls)
- Woodhall Thistle
1910	Sunderland	0	(0)
- Leyton
- Sunderland Rovers
1913	Blackpool	24	(2)
1914	Bolton Wanderers	116	(14)
1923	Tranmere Rovers	36	(0)
- Runcorn
- Atherton Collieries
- * Club domestic league appearances and goals

Thomas Murray Buchan (September 1889 – 1952) was an English professional footballer. A left half who was also capable of playing as a right half or inside right, he played for nine clubs in his career. He was the older brother of Charlie Buchan.

== Career ==
Buchan began his career with non-League clubs Woodhall Thistle and Northfleet United. In 1911 he signed for Leyton and then Sunderland, but did not make any Football League appearances for the Black Cats.

He signed for Blackpool in 1913. He made 24 League appearances for the Seasiders, scoring two goals. In 1914 he joined nearby Bolton Wanderers, for whom he made 116 League appearances and scored fourteen goals in eight years.

He spent a season with Tranmere Rovers in 1923–24, before finishing his career with Runcorn and Atherton.
