= Wilf Gillow =

English footballer and manager (1892–1944)

Personal information
- Full name: Wilfred Bernard Gillow
- Date of birth: 8 July 1892
- Place of birth: Preston, Lancashire, England
- Date of death: 11 March 1944 (aged 51)
- Place of death: Middlesbrough, England
- Height: 5 ft 10 in (1.78 m)

Senior career*
Years	Team	Apps	(Gls)
1912–1914	Blackpool	25	(3)
- Preston North End
- Fleetwood
- Grimsby Town
Total		25	(3)

Managerial career
- 1924–1932: Grimsby Town
- 1934–1944: Middlesbrough
- * Club domestic league appearances and goals

Wilfred Bernard Gillow (8 July 1892 – 11 March 1944) was an English professional football player and manager. Gillow also played cricket at county level.

== Football career ==
Gillow played club football for Blackpool, Preston North End, Fleetwood and Grimsby Town.

Gillow began his coaching career as player-manager at Grimsby Town, and was in charge from 1924 to 1932. He also managed Middlesbrough from March 1934 until his death in March 1944, which came after a "serious" operation.

== Cricket career ==
Gillow played club cricket for Cleethorpes, and represented Lincolnshire in 1926.

== Managerial statistics ==
Managerial record by team and tenure
Team	From	To	Record					Ref
Team	From	To	P	W	D	L	Win %	Ref
Grimsby Town	June 1924	April 1932	353	142	68	143	40.2	
Middlesbrough	March 1934	March 1944	236	92	55	89	39.0	
Total			589	234	123	232	39.7	—
