= Jimmy Heathcote =

English footballer

Personal information
- Full name: James Heathcote
- Date of birth: 17 January 1894
- Place of birth: Bolton, Lancashire, England
- Height: 5 ft 9 1/2 in (1.77 m)
- Positions: Centre forward; inside forward

Senior career*
Years	Team	Apps	(Gls)
1914–191?	Bolton Wanderers	0	(0)
1919–1922	Blackpool	89	(33)
1922–1923	Notts County	12	(1)
1923–1924	Pontypridd		
1924–1925	Lincoln City	33	(13)
1925–1926	Mansfield Town		
1926–1928	Coventry City	60	(37)
1928–1929	Accrington Stanley	0	(0)
- * Club domestic league appearances and goals

James Heathcote (17 January 1894 – after 1928) was an English footballer who scored 83 goals from 197 appearances in the Football League playing for Blackpool, Notts County, Lincoln City and Coventry City. He played as a centre forward or inside forward. He was on the books of Bolton Wanderers and Accrington Stanley without representing either club in the league, and also played in the Southern League for Pontypridd and in the Midland League for Mansfield Town.
