= 1920–21 Blackpool F.C. season =

English football club season

Blackpool F.C.
1920–21 season
- Manager: Bill Norman
- Division Two: 4th
- FA Cup: Second round
- Top goalscorer: League: Jimmy Heathcote (18); All: Jimmy Heathcote (18)
Home colours

The 1920–21 season was Blackpool F.C.'s twentieth season (seventeenth consecutive) in the Football League. They competed in the 22-team Division Two, then the second tier of English football, finishing fourth.

Blackpool defender Horace Fairhurst suffered a head injury during Blackpool's game against Barnsley at Oakwell on 27 December 1920. He died at home eleven days later as a result of the injury.

Jimmy Heathcote was the club's top scorer, with eighteen goals.

== Season synopsis ==
Although Blackpool matched the previous season's fourth-placed finishing position, this campaign's League season got off to a slow start, picking up only two points from a possible eight from their opening four games. A victory, 4–0 at home to Coventry City on 11 September, got them on their way. Two wins in their next three games followed.

At the halfway point, they had 25 points to their name. They acquired another 25 in the second half, but a loss and three draws in their final four fixtures saw them unable to keep pace with Birmingham and Cardiff City.

For the second straight season, Blackpool exited the FA Cup in Round Two.

== Table ==
Pos	Team	Pld	W	D	L	GF	GA	GAv	Pts	Promotion or relegation
2	Cardiff City (P)	42	24	10	8	59	32	1.844	58	Promotion to the Frst Division
3	Bristol City	42	19	13	10	49	29	1.690	51	
4	Blackpool	42	20	10	12	54	42	1.286	50	
5	West Ham United	42	19	10	13	51	30	1.700	48	
6	Notts County	42	18	11	13	55	40	1.375	47	

(P) Promoted

== Player statistics ==
=== Appearances ===
==== League ====
Mingay 13, Fairhurst 20, Tulloch 40, Keenan 42, Halstead 1, Howard 8, Charles 33, Heathcote 40, Ratcliffe 13, McGinn 24, Donachie 19, Benton 39, Popplewell 1, Barrass 32, Burke 7, Gavin 18, Brown 1, Richardson 29, Bainbridge 2, Rooks 17, Mee 29, Baker 12, Hunter 2, Reid 3, Lovett 2, Marsh 1, Leaver 3, Bedford 10

Players used: 28

==== FA Cup ====
Tulloch 2, Keenan 3, Charles 3, Heathcote 3, Ratcliffe 2, McGinn 3, Benton 3, Barrass 3, Gavin 3, Richardson 3, Mee 3, Rooks 2

Players used: 12

=== Goals ===
==== League ====
Heathcote 18, Barrass 9, Bedford 7, Benton 6, Keenan 3, Charles 3, Ratcliffe 2, Mee 2, Reid 2, Donachie 1, Rooks 1

Goals scored: 54

==== FA Cup ====
Ratcliffe 2, Barrass 1, McGinn 1

Goals scored: 4

== Transfers ==
=== In ===
Date	Player	From	Fee

=== Out ===
Date	Player	From	Fee
