= Andy Walker (football manager) =

English football manager

- Occupation: Football team manager
- Known for: Lifetime ban stemming from a bribing scandal

Andy Walker was manager of English football team Middlesbrough F.C. from June 1910 to January 1911.

Following Andy Aitken's departure in February 1909, Boro had been managed by secretary-manager John Gunter for sixteen months before Walker signed on 27 June 1910.

Controversy was set to follow Walker throughout his brief time as manager. Soon after his appointment, he was in trouble for illegally approaching one of his former Airdrie players to try to convince him to sign for Boro. He was caught and banned for four weeks, while the club were fined £100.

In December 1910, chairman Thomas Gibson-Poole, the local Conservative Party candidate, believed that if Middlesbrough beat Sunderland in the derby game at Ayresome Park two days prior to the election, it would improve his chances of winning. Before the game took place, Walker offered Sunderland captain Charlie Thompson £30 to throw the match, but he rejected and reported the matter to his chairman who subsequently informed the Football Association. Middlesbrough actually won the game, but Gibson-Poole lost the election by over 3000 votes.

On 16 January 1911, an FA Commission decided that money had been offered and both Walker and Gibson-Poole were suspended from football for life. Some believed that Walker had only been a pawn, but despite a 12,500 strong petition to the FA to reconsider his ban, it was upheld.
