= Len Appleton =

English footballer

Personal information
- Full name: Leonard Appleton
- Date of birth: 16 November 1892
- Place of birth: Bamfurlong, England
- Date of death: 1970 (aged 77–78)
- Height: 5 ft 7 in (1.70 m)
- Position: Midfielder

Senior career*
Years	Team	Apps	(Gls)
- Scowcroft's Colliery
- Atherton Town
1914–1919	Blackpool	33	(3)
1920	Exeter City	37	(2)
1921	Southport	25	(0)
- * Club domestic league appearances and goals

Leonard Appleton (16 November 1892 – 1970) was an English footballer. He played for Blackpool, Exeter City and Southport.
