= 1913–14 Blackpool F.C. season =

English football club season

Blackpool F.C.
1913–14 season
- Manager: None
- Division Two: 16th
- FA Cup: First round
- Top goalscorer: League: Joe Lane (11); All: Joe Lane (11)
Home colours

The 1913–14 season was Blackpool F.C.'s 17th season (14th consecutive) in the Football League. They competed in the twenty-team Division Two, then the second tier of English football, finishing sixteenth.

Joe Lane was the club's top scorer, with eleven goals.

When Levy Thorpe left the club in late October, he was on a streak of playing in 98 consecutive games for the club.

== Season synopsis ==
After drawing their opening league game, 2–2 at home to Hull City, Blackpool went on to lose their next four games, scoring only once in the process. After their victory over Lincoln City at Bloomfield Road on 4 October, Blackpool went on an eight-game winless streak.

After winning only nine games all season, the club finished fifth from the bottom of the table, with the lowest goals-scored tally (33) in the division.

Their FA Cup run ended at the first hurdle with a single-goal defeat at Gillingham on New Year's Day.

== Table ==
Pos	Team	Pld	W	D	L	GF	GA	GAv	Pts
14	Birmingham	38	12	10	16	48	60	0.800	34
15	Grimsby Town	38	13	8	17	42	58	0.724	34
16	Blackpool	38	9	14	15	33	44	0.750	32
17	Glossop	38	11	6	21	51	67	0.761	28
18	Leicester Fosse	38	11	4	23	45	61	0.738	26

== Player statistics ==
=== Appearances ===
==== League ====
Fiske 3, Millership 16, Jones 38, Thorpe 9, Heslop 2, Booth 38, Charles 31, Turley 7, Brown 13, Gillow 2, Quinn 21, Connor 36, Buchan 24, Pagman 20, Sharp 3, Robson 21, Bainbridge 29, Rushton 1, Burke 2, Lane 26, Charlton 22, Rooks 7, Green 10, Wilson 1, Kidd 4, Keenan 1

Players used: 26

==== FA Cup ====
Fiske 1, Jones 1, Booth 1, Charles 1, Connor 1, Robson 1, Bainbridge 1, Lane 1, Charlton 1, Rooks 1, Green 1

Players used: 11

=== Goals ===
==== League ====
Lane 11, Charles 7, Connor 4, Charlton 3, Brown 2, Quinn 2, Buchan 2, Turley 1, Pagman 1,

Goals scored: 33

== Transfers ==
=== In ===
Date	Player	From	Fee

=== Out ===
Date	Player	From	Fee
