= 1914–15 Blackpool F.C. season =

English football club season

Blackpool F.C.
1914–15 season
- Manager: None
- Division Two: 10th
- FA Cup: First round
- Top goalscorer: League: Joe Lane (28); All: Joe Lane (28)
Home colours

The 1914–15 season was Blackpool F.C.'s 18th season (15th consecutive) in the Football League. They competed in the twenty-team Division Two, then the second tier of English football, finishing tenth.

Joe Lane, ever-present throughout the season, was the club's top scorer for the second consecutive season, with 28 goals to his name. Harold Keenan, though still a member of the squad, didn't make any appearances for the club.

== Season synopsis ==
The season started slowly for the Seasiders, with five defeats in their opening six league games — a 3–1 victory (thanks to a Joe Lane hat-trick) at Hull City on 5 September being the anomaly. The run did not get any better; indeed in ten league games, Blackpool lost eight times. Their form picked up from November onwards, however, but inconsistency was rife.

The players redeemed themselves somewhat with eight victories in their final ten games, which resulted in their top-ten finish.

For the third consecutive season, Blackpool's FA Cup campaign ended at the first-round stage.

== Table ==
Pos	Team	Pld	W	D	L	GF	GA	GAv	Pts
8	Huddersfield Town	38	17	8	13	61	42	1.452	42
9	Clapton Orient	38	16	9	13	50	48	1.042	41
10	Blackpool	38	17	5	16	58	57	1.018	39
11	Bury	38	15	8	15	61	56	1.089	38
12	Fulham	38	15	7	16	53	47	1.128	37

== Player statistics ==
=== Appearances ===
==== League ====
Kidd 30, Robson 25, Jones 21, Bainbridge 38, Connor 9, Rooks 14, Charles 35, Turley 4, Lane 38, Yarnall 9, Quinn 37, Green 21, Booth 27, Millership 2, Tulloch 25, Sibbald 27, Wilson 27, Appleton 18, Gregson 3, Mitchell 5, Thompson 3

Players used: 21

==== FA Cup ====
Kidd 1, Robson 1, Bainbridge 1, Charles 1, Lane 1, Quinn 1, Green 1, Booth 1, Tulloch 1, Sibbald 1, Wilson 1

Players used: 11

=== Goals ===
==== League ====
Lane 28, Sibbald 7, Charles, 6, Quinn 4, Green 4, Appleton 3, Booth 2, Wilson 2, Bainbridge 1, Yarnall 1

Goals scored: 58

==== FA Cup ====
Sibbald 1

Goals scored: 1

== Transfers ==
=== In ===
Date	Player	From	Fee

=== Out ===
Date	Player	From	Fee
