= 1911–12 Blackpool F.C. season =

English football club season

Blackpool F.C.
1911–12 season
- Manager: None
- Division Two: 14th
- FA Cup: Second round
- Top goalscorer: League: Arthur Wolstenholme (9); All: Arthur Wolstenholme (10)
Home colours

The 1911–12 season was Blackpool F.C.'s 15th season (12th consecutive) in the Football League. They competed in the twenty-team Division Two, then the second tier of English football, finishing fourteenth.

Arthur Wolstenholme was the club's top scorer, with ten goals (nine in the league and one in the FA Cup).

== Season synopsis ==
Inconsistency throughout Blackpool's league season saw three straight defeats in their second, third and fourth outings, followed by three victories. Four defeats in a row occurred between 10 February and 2 March, with only one goal scored in their favour.

After two first-round replays against Crewe Alexandra (the first being abandoned after 61 minutes) in the FA Cup, Blackpool were knocked out at Bolton Wanderers in round two.

== Table ==
Pos	Team	Pld	W	D	L	GF	GA	GAv	Pts
12	Birmingham	38	14	6	18	55	59	0.932	34
13	Bristol City	38	14	6	18	41	60	0.683	34
14	Blackpool	38	13	8	17	32	52	0.615	34
15	Nottingham Forest	38	13	7	18	46	48	0.958	33
16	Stockport County	38	11	11	16	47	54	0.870	33

== Player statistics ==
=== Appearances ===
==== League ====
- Fiske – 32
- Crewdson – 35
- Gladwin – 26
- Thorpe – 38
- Connor – 38
- Evans – 18
- Morley – 21
- Wolstenholme – 31
- Milne – 21
- Metcalfe – 3
- Nesbitt – 12
- Cahill – 21
- Clarke, W – 6
- Owen – 2
- Quinn – 27
- Dale – 14
- Downhall – 1
- Cowie – 3
- Dollins – 5
- Cox – 15
- Bradshaw – 17
- Kidd – 6
- Bainbridge – 10
- Clarke, T – 2
- Mitchell – 3
- Wilson – 9
- Spencer – 1
- Howard – 1

Players used: 28

==== FA Cup ====
- Fiske – 2
- Crewdson – 4
- Gladwin – 4
- Thorpe – 4
- Connor – 4
- Morley – 2
- Wolstenholme – 2
- Milne – 1
- Cahill – 4
- Clarke, W – 1
- Quinn – 3
- Cowie – 2
- Cox – 3
- Bradshaw – 4
- Kidd – 2
- Bainbridge – 2

Players used: 16

=== Goals ===
==== League ====
- Wolstenholme – 9
- Milne – 6
- Morley – 4
- Nesbitt – 4
- Quinn – 3
- Connor – 2
- Clarke, W – 1
- Thorpe – 1
- Wilson – 1

League goals scored: 31 (plus one own-goal)

==== FA Cup ====
- Bainbridge – 1
- Cowie – 1
- Milne – 1
- Quinn – 1
- Wolstenholme – 1

FA Cup goals scored: 5

== Transfers ==
=== In ===
Date	Player	From	Fee

=== Out ===
Date	Player	From	Fee
