= 1912–13 Blackpool F.C. season =

English football club season

Blackpool F.C.
1912–13 season
- Manager: None
- Division Two: 20th (bottom)
- FA Cup: First round
- Top goalscorer: League: George Wilson (10); All: George Wilson (10)
Home colours

The 1912–13 season was Blackpool F.C.'s 16th season (13th consecutive) in the Football League. They competed in the twenty-team Division Two, then the second tier of English football, finishing bottom. Their application for re-election was successful.

George Wilson was the club's top scorer, with ten goals.

== Season synopsis ==
Other than two victories in their opening four league games, Blackpool's nine wins were spaced out over the course of the season. By the league season's halfway point, a 4–0 Christmas Day defeat at Lancashire rivals Burnley, they had won only two further games. Of the remaining nineteen matches, Blackpool lost ten, a sequence that contributed to their finishing at the foot of the table.

In the FA Cup, Blackpool took Tottenham to a first-round replay after a 1–1 draw at White Hart Lane on 11 January. Three days later, the replay was played at the same venue after Blackpool sold Spurs the ground rights. The Londoners were victorious 6–1.

To the consternation of the Seasiders' fans, their arch-rivals Preston North End won the championship and Burnley took the second promotion spot.

== Table ==
Pos	Team	Pld	W	D	L	GF	GA	GAv	Pts	Promotion
16	Bristol City	38	9	15	14	46	72	0.639	33	
17	Nottingham Forest	38	12	8	18	58	59	0.983	32	
18	Glossop	38	12	8	18	49	68	0.721	32	
19	Stockport County	38	8	10	20	56	78	0.718	26	Re-elected
20	Blackpool	38	9	8	21	39	69	0.565	26	Re-elected

== Player statistics ==
=== Appearances ===
==== League ====
- Fiske – 22
- Dale – 5
- Gladwin – 10
- Thorpe – 38
- Connor – 28
- Booth – 23
- Charles – 38
- Heslop – 27
- Dollins – 13
- Wilkinson – 15
- Quinn – 32
- Wilson – 24
- Chapman – 2
- Bainbridge – 28
- Jones – 32
- Kidd – 16
- Gillow – 23
- Crewdson – 17
- Millership – 12
- Davies – 3
- McCulloch – 1
- Keenan – 1
- Reeves – 4
- Pagnam – 3

Players used: 24

==== FA Cup ====
- Thorpe – 2
- Booth – 2
- Charles – 2
- Heslop – 2
- Dollins – 2
- Quinn – 1
- Wilson – 2
- Jones – 2
- Kidd – 2
- Gillow – 2
- Crewdson – 2
- Davies – 1

Players used: 12

=== Goals ===
==== League ====
- Wilson – 10
- Bainbridge – 9
- Charles – 4
- Heslop – 4
- Connor – 3
- Gillow – 3^{1}
- Quinn – 3
- Booth – 1
- Dollins – 1
- Wilkinson – 1

League goals scored: 39

==== FA Cup ====
- Charles – 2

FA Cup goals scored: 2

== Transfers ==
=== In ===
Date	Player	From	Fee

=== Out ===
Date	Player	From	Fee

== Footnotes ==
- ^1 In Roy Calley's book, Gillow is incorrectly stated as having scored two league goals
