= 1919–20 Blackpool F.C. season =

English football club season

Blackpool F.C.
1919–20 season
- Manager: Bill Norman
- Division Two: 4th
- FA Cup: Second round
- Top goalscorer: League: Joe Lane (26); All: Joe Lane (28)
Home colours

The 1919–20 season was Blackpool F.C.'s 19th season (16th consecutive) in the Football League. They competed in the 22-team Division Two, then the second tier of English football, finishing fourth.

Joe Lane was the club's top scorer, with 28 goals (26 in the league and two in the FA Cup).

== Season synopsis ==
Blackpool's League season began with three victories in their opening four fixtures. Inconsistency then took over until mid-October, when they managed to string four consecutive wins together. The unbeaten run continued for four more games, before a 3–0 home defeat to Huddersfield Town on 13 December blotted their copybook.

Eleven wins in the second half of the campaign assisted in their fourth-placed finish.

The club's FA Cup run ended in the second round, with a defeat at local rivals Preston North End.

== Table ==
Pos	Team	Pld	W	D	L	GF	GA	GAv	Pts	Promotion or relegation
2	Huddersfield Town (P)	42	28	8	6	97	38	2.553	64	Promotion to the First Division
3	Birmingham	42	24	8	10	85	34	2.500	56	
4	Blackpool	42	21	10	11	65	47	1.383	52	
5	Bury	42	20	8	14	60	44	1.364	48	
6	Fulham	42	19	9	14	61	50	1.220	47	

(P) Promoted

== Player statistics ==
=== Appearances ===
==== League ====
Mingay 41, Tulloch 35, Jones 22, Keenan 35, Wilson 22, Rooks 39, Charles 27, Heathcoate 31, Lane 30, Sibbald 32, Quinn 24, Fairhurst 27, Booth 8, Appleton 15, O'Doherty 1, Tremelling 7, Jacklin 1, McGinn 20, Burke 9, Hunter 11, Marsh 4, Bainbridge 1, Berry 5, Baker 7, Kent 5, Howard 1, Dumper 1, Barrass 1

Players used: 28

==== FA Cup ====
Mingay 3, Tulloch 3, Keenan 3, Wilson 3, Rooks 3, Charles 3, Heathcote 1, Lane 3, Quinn 3, Fairhurst 3, McGinn 2, Sibbald 3

Players used: 12

=== Goals ===
==== League ====
Lane 26, Heathcote 13, Sibbald 6, Charles 4, Quinn 4, Hunter 4, Rooks 3, Booth 2, Wilson 1, McGinn 1, Berry 1

Goals scored: 65

==== FA Cup ====
Lane 2, Charles 1, Sibbald 1, Quinn 1

Goals scored: 5

== Transfers ==
=== In ===
Date	Player	From	Fee

=== Out ===
Date	Player	From	Fee
