= 1989–90 Blackpool F.C. season =

English football club season

Blackpool F.C.
1989–90 season
- Owner and chairman: Owen Oyston
- Manager: Jimmy Mullen (succeeded by Tom White)
- Division Three: 23rd (relegated)
- FA Cup: Fifth round
- League Cup: Third round
- Top goalscorer: League: Andy Garner (8); All: Andy Garner (10)

The 1989–90 season was Blackpool F.C.'s 82nd season (79th consecutive) in the Football League. They competed in the 24-team Division Three, then the third tier of English league football, finishing second-bottom. As a result, they were relegated to the league's basement division.

Jimmy Mullen replaced Sam Ellis as manager prior to the start of the season. It was to be his only season in charge of the club.

Blackpool had a prolonged run in the FA Cup, eventually succumbing to Queens Park Rangers after two fifth-round replays.

Andy Garner was the club's top scorer for the second consecutive season, with ten goals (eight in the league, one in the FA Cup and one in the League Cup).

A squad photograph taken prior to the club's FA Cup tie with Q.P.R. appeared in Match magazine. Appearing were Carl Richards, Shaun Elliott, Shaun Dunn, Gary Brook, Ian Gore, Steve Morgan, Mark Gayle, Andy Garner, manager Jimmy Mullen, Steve McIlhargey, Mark Bradshaw, Nigel Hawkins, Alan Wright, David Eyres, Russell Coughlin, Mark Taylor, Paul Groves and Colin Methven.

== Table ==
Pos	Team	Pld	W	D	L	GF	GA	GD	Pts	Promotion or relegation
20	Fulham	46	12	15	19	55	66	−11	51	
21	Cardiff City (R)	46	12	14	20	51	70	−19	50	Relegation to the Fourth Division
22	Northampton Town (R)	46	11	14	21	51	68	−17	47	Relegation to the Fourth Division
23	Blackpool (R)	46	10	16	20	49	73	−24	46	Relegation to the Fourth Division
24	Walsall (R)	46	9	14	23	40	72	−32	41	Relegation to the Fourth Division

(R) Relegated
