= 1990–91 Blackpool F.C. season =

English football club season

Blackpool F.C.
1990–91 season
- Owner and chairman: Owen Oyston
- Manager: Graham Carr (until 30 November 1990); Billy Ayre (from 1 December 1990)
- Division Four: 5th
- Play-offs: Runners-up
- FA Cup: Third round
- League Cup: First round
- League Trophy: Quarter-finals
- Top goalscorer: Dave Bamber (17)
- Highest home attendance: 9,563 v Tottenham Hotspur, FA Cup, 5 January 1991
- Lowest home attendance: 1,696 v Darlington, League Cup, 4 September 1990

The 1990–91 season was Blackpool F.C.'s 83rd season (80th consecutive) in the Football League. They competed in the 24-team Division Four, then the fourth tier of English football. They finished fifth, missing out on automatic promotion by one point after a final-day defeat at Walsall, and made the play-offs; however, they lost in the final, against Torquay United, in a penalty-shootout after the game finished 2–2 after normal and extra time.

Graham Carr was replaced as manager by his assistant, Billy Ayre, on 30 November. Between 10 November and the end of the season, the club went on to record thirteen consecutive League wins at Bloomfield Road.

Dave Bamber was the club's top scorer, with seventeen league goals.

== Results ==
| Date | Competition | Opponent (home/away) | Result | Scorer(s) | Attendance |
|---|---|---|---|---|---|
| 25 August 1990 | League | Scunthorpe United (a) | L 0–2 | | 3,024 |
| 28 August 1990 | League Cup, first round, first leg | Darlington (a) | D 0-0 | | 2,254 |
| 1 September 1990 | League | Rochdale (h) | D 0-0 | | 3,357 |
| 4 September 1990 | League Cup, first round, second leg | Darlington (h) | D 1–1 | Brook | 1,696 |
| 8 September 1990 | League | Northampton Town (a) | L 0–1 | | 4,300 |
| 15 September 1990 | League | Wrexham (h) | W 4–1 | Stant, Eyres, opposition own goal, Rodwell | 3,497 |
| 18 September 1990 | League | Burnley (h) | L 1–2 | Stant | 4,737 |
| 22 September 1990 | League | Chesterfield (a) | D 2–2 | Groves, Garner (penalty) | 3,549 |
| 29 September 1990 | League | Hartlepool United (h) | W 2–0 | Eyres, Groves | 3,181 |
| 3 October 1990 | League | Scarborough (a) | W 1–0 | Groves | 1,713 |
| 6 October 1990 | League | Torquay United (a) | L 1–2 | Stant | 2,884 |
| 13 October 1990 | League | Darlington (h) | L 1–2 | Garner | 4,092 |
| 20 October 1990 | League | Gillingham (h) | W 2–0 | Stant, Eyres | 3,041 |
| 22 October 1990 | League | Stockport County (a) | D 0-0 | | 4,337 |
| 27 October 1990 | League | Halifax Town (a) | L 3–5 | Rodwell 2, Stant | 1,945 |
| 3 November 1990 | League | Walsall (h) | L 1–2 | Groves | 3,233 |
| 10 November 1990 | League | Aldershot (h) | W 4–2 | Sinclair, Taylor, Garner (penalty), Lancaster | 2,065 |
| 17 November 1990 | FA Cup, first round | Grimsby Town (h) | W 2–0 | Groves, Garner | 4,175 |
| 24 November 1990 | League | Doncaster Rovers (a) | L 0–0 | | 2,113 |
| 1 December 1990 | League | Hereford United (a) | D 1–1 | Bamber | 2,588 |
| 10 December 1990 | FA Cup, second round | Huddersfield Town (a) | W 2–0 | Groves, opposition own goal | 6,329 |
| 15 December 1990 | League | Maidstone United (h) | D 2–2 | Garner, Bamber | 2,341 |
| 23 December 1990 | League | Carlisle United (a) | L 0–0 | | 5,195 |
| 26 December 1990 | League | Peterborough United (h) | D 1–1 | Garner | 3,658 |
| 29 December 1990 | League | Lincoln City (h) | W 5–0 | Groves 2 (1 penalty), Bamber 2, Eyres | 2,519 |
| 1 January 1991 | League | York City (a) | W 1–0 | Horner | 3,115 |
| 5 January 1991 | FA Cup, third round | Tottenham Hotspur (h) | L 0–1 | | 9,563 |
| 12 January 1991 | League | Rochdale (a) | L 1–2 | Bamber | 2,621 |
| 19 January 1991 | League | Scunthorpe United (h) | W 3–1 | Bamber 2, Garner | 2,494 |
| 26 January 1991 | League | Wrexham (a) | W 1–0 | Garner (penalty) | 2,393 |
| 5 February 1991 | League | Chesterfield (h) | W 3–0 | Bamber, Horner, Garner | 2,357 |
| 16 February 1991 | League | Doncaster Rovers (h) | W 2–0 | Taylor, Horner | 3,533 |
| 23 February 1991 | League | Aldershot (a) | W 4–1 | Bamber 2, Garner 2 | 2,164 |
| 2 March 1991 | League | Hereford United (h) | W 3–0 | Bamber 2, Richards | 3,636 |
| 9 March 1991 | League | Maidstone United (a) | D 1–1 | Richards | 2,253 |
| 12 March 1991 | League | Scarborough (h) | W 3–1 | Richards, Taylor, Bamber | 3,798 |
| 16 March 1991 | League | Hartlepool United (a) | W 2–1 | Horner, Rodwell | 2,840 |
| 19 March 1991 | League | Darlington (a) | D 1–1 | Opposition own goal | 4,108 |
| 23 March 1991 | League | Torquay United (h) | W 1–0 | Bamber | 4,778 |
| 30 March 1991 | League | Peterborough United (a) | L 0–2 | | 7,721 |
| 2 April 1991 | League | Carlisle United (h) | W 6–0 | Bamber 2, Horner, Groves (penalty), Rodwell, Richards | 5,368 |
| 6 April 1991 | League | Lincoln City (a) | W 1–0 | Bamber | 4,003 |
| 13 April 1991 | League | York City (h) | W 1–0 | Groves | 5,086 |
| 17 April 1991 | League | Cardiff City (h) | W 3–0 | Groves, Horner, Rodwell | 4,813 |
| 20 April 1991 | League | Gillingham (a) | D 2–2 | Davies, Horner | 3,028 |
| 23 April 1991 | League | Burnley (a) | L 0–2 | | 18,398 |
| 27 April 1991 | League | Stockpot County (h) | W 3–2 | Eyres, Garner 2 | 8,590 |
| 30 April 1991 | League | Halifax Town (h) | W 2–0 | Rodwell, Groves | 5,883 |
| 2 May 1991 | League | Cardiff City (a) | D 1–1 | Garner (penalty) | 1,793 |
| 7 May 1991 | League | Northampton Town (h) | W 2–1 | Eyres, Groves | 7,298 |
| 11 May 1991 | League | Walsall (a) | L 0–2 | | 8,051 |
| 19 May 1991 | Play-off semi-finals, first leg | Scunthorpe United (a) | D 1–1 | Rodwell | 6,536 |
| 22 May 1991 | Play-off semi-finals, second leg | Scunthorpe United (h) | W 2–1 | Eyres 2 | 7,596 |
| 31 May 1991 | Play-off final | Torquay United (n) | D 2–2 | Groves, opposition own goal | 21,615 |

== Table ==
| Pos | Team | Pld | W | D | L | GF | GA | GD | Pts | Promotion |
|---|---|---|---|---|---|---|---|---|---|---|
| 3 | Hartlepool United (P) | 46 | 24 | 10 | 12 | 67 | 48 | +19 | 82 | Promotion to the Third Division |
| 4 | Peterborough United (P) | 46 | 21 | 17 | 8 | 67 | 45 | +22 | 80 | Promotion to the Third Division |
| 5 | Blackpool | 46 | 23 | 10 | 13 | 78 | 47 | +31 | 79 | Qualification for the Fourth Division play-offs |
| 6 | Burnley | 46 | 23 | 10 | 13 | 70 | 51 | +19 | 79 | Qualification for the Fourth Division play-offs |
| 7 | Torquay United (O, P) | 46 | 18 | 18 | 10 | 64 | 47 | +17 | 72 | Qualification for the Fourth Division play-offs |

(O) Play-off winners; (P) Promoted

=== Play-offs ===
==== Semi-finals ====
Blackpool and Scunthorpe United met in the two-legged semi-finals of the play-offs. The first leg, played at Glanford Park on 19 May, finished 1–1. Three days later, Blackpool won the return leg at Bloomfield Road 2–0, courtesy of a double by David Eyres, and took the tie 3–2 on aggregate. Blackpool's celebration of reaching Wembley since the famous "Matthews Final" thirty-eight years earlier was overshadowed by the news that their former player and manager Stan Mortensen, who scored a hat-trick in that final, had died earlier in the day, at the age of 69.

==== Final ====
On 31 May, Blackpool met Torquay United in the final at Wembley. The game finished 2–2 after normal time and extra time. It went to a penalty-shootout, which Torquay won 5–4. Dave Bamber missed the decisive penalty, the second of sudden death, putting it well wide of Gareth Howells' left-hand post.

1991-05-31
15:00 BST

| Blackpool | 2-2 (4-5 on penalties) | Torquay United |
|---|---|---|
| Groves; Curran (o.g.) | (Report) | Saunders; Edwards |

Wembley Stadium, London
Attendance: 21,615
Referee: George Courtney, Spennymoor

Blackpool

1McIlhargey
2Davies (substituted off) (for Sinclair)
3Wright
4Groves
5Horner
6Gore
7Rodwell
8Taylor
9Bamber
10Garner (c)
11Eyres

Substitutes:

12Sinclair (substituted on) (for Davies)
14Richards

Manager:
Billy Ayre

Torquay United

1Howells
2Curran
3P. Holmes
4Saunders
5Elliott
6Joyce
7Myers
8M. Holmes
9Evans
10Edwards
11Loram

Substitutes:

12Hall
14

Manager:
John Impey

== Player statistics ==
=== Appearances ===
| Name | League | Play-offs | FA Cup | League Cup | Total |
|---|---|---|---|---|---|
| Paul Groves | 46 | 3 | 3 | 2 | 54 |
| Alan Wright | 45 | 3 | 3 | 2 | 53 |
| Steve McIlhargey | 44 | 3 | 3 | 2 | 52 |
| Tony Rodwell | 45 | 3 | 3 | 1 | 52 |
| Ian Gore | 41 | 3 | 3 | 2 | 49 |
| Phil Horner | 39 | 3 | 3 | 0 | 45 |
| Andy Garner | 36 | 3 | 3 | 2 | 44 |
| David Eyres | 36 | 3 | 1 | 2 | 42 |
| Mike Davies | 37 | 3 | 1 | 0 | 41 |
| Trevor Sinclair | 31 | 2 | 3 | 2 | 38 |
| Gary Briggs | 30 | 2 | 3 | 2 | 37 |
| Dave Bamber | 23 | 1 | 1 | 0 | 25 |
| Carl Richards | 22 | 0 | 2 | 1 | 25 |
| Chris Hedworth | 20 | 0 | 3 | 0 | 23 |
| Mark Taylor | 19 | 3 | 0 | 1 | 23 |
| Phil Stant | 12 | 0 | 0 | 0 | 12 |
| Dave Lancaster | 8 | 0 | 0 | 2 | 10 |
| Gary Brook | 4 | 0 | 0 | 2 | 6 |
| A. Smalley | 6 | 0 | 0 | 0 | 6 |
| Andy Gouck | 5 | 0 | 0 | 0 | 5 |
| Mark Bradshaw | 1 | 0 | 0 | 2 | 3 |
| Mark Wright | 3 | 0 | 0 | 0 | 3 |
| Fred Barber | 2 | 0 | 0 | 0 | 2 |
| Gordon Owen | 1 | 0 | 0 | 0 | 1 |
| Russell Coughlin | 0 | 0 | 0 | 0 | 0 |

Players used: 24

=== Goals ===
| Name | League | Play-offs | FA Cup | League Cup | Total |
|---|---|---|---|---|---|
| Dave Bamber | 17 | 0 | 0 | 0 | 17 |
| Paul Groves | 11 | 1 | 2 | 0 | 14 |
| Andy Garner | 13 | 0 | 1 | 0 | 14 |
| David Eyres | 6 | 2 | 0 | 0 | 8 |
| Tony Rodwell | 7 | 1 | 0 | 0 | 8 |
| Phil Horner | 7 | 0 | 0 | 0 | 7 |
| Phil Stant | 5 | 0 | 0 | 0 | 5 |
| Carl Richards | 4 | 0 | 0 | 0 | 4 |
| Mark Taylor | 3 | 0 | 0 | 0 | 3 |
| Gary Brook | 0 | 0 | 0 | 1 | 1 |
| Mike Davies | 1 | 0 | 0 | 0 | 1 |
| Dave Lancaster | 1 | 0 | 0 | 0 | 1 |
| Trevor Sinclair | 1 | 0 | 0 | 0 | 1 |

Total goals scored: 84 (plus four own-goals)
