= 1987–88 Blackpool F.C. season =

English football club season

Blackpool F.C.
1987–88 season
- Manager: Sam Ellis
- Division Three: 10th
- FA Cup: Fourth round
- League Cup: Second round
- Top goalscorer: League: Mark Taylor (21); All: Mark Taylor (23)
Home colours

The 1987–88 season was Blackpool F.C.'s 80th season (77th consecutive) in the Football League. They competed in the 24-team Division Three, then the third tier of English league football, finishing tenth.

Mark Taylor was the club's top scorer, with 23 goals (21 in the league and two in the FA Cup).

The following players partook in the squad photo before the season's commencement: John Deary, Andy McAteer, Colin Methven, Richard Powell, Tony Cunningham, Barry Siddall, Paul Jones, Neil Matthews, Mark Bradshaw, Mike Davies, Mark Taylor, Craig Madden, Steve Morgan, Mike Walsh, Keith Walwyn, Brian Butler, Carl Lancashire and Alan Mayes.

== Table ==
| Pos | Team | Pld | W | D | L | GF | GA | GD | Pts |
|---|---|---|---|---|---|---|---|---|---|
| 8 | Bristol Rovers | 46 | 18 | 12 | 16 | 68 | 56 | +12 | 66 |
| 9 | Fulham | 46 | 19 | 9 | 18 | 69 | 60 | +9 | 66 |
| 10 | Blackpool | 46 | 17 | 14 | 15 | 71 | 62 | +9 | 65 |
| 11 | Port Vale | 46 | 18 | 11 | 17 | 58 | 56 | +2 | 65 |
| 12 | Brentford | 46 | 16 | 14 | 16 | 53 | 59 | −6 | 62 |

Rules for classification: 1) Points; 2) Goal difference; 3) Goals scored

== Results ==
=== Third Division ===
| Win | Draw | Loss |

Third Division match results
| Date | Opponent | Venue | Result F–A | Scorers | Attendance |
|---|---|---|---|---|---|
| 15 August 1987 | Gillingham | A | 0–0 | | 4,430 |
| 22 August 1987 | Walsall | H | 1–2 | Cunningham | 4,614 |
| 29 August 1987 | Bury | A | 1–3 | Walwyn | 3,053 |
| 31 August 1987 | Bristol Rovers | H | 2–1 | Cunningham (2) | 3,319 |
| 5 September 1987 | Brighton & Hove Albion | A | 3–1 | Cunningham (2), Taylor | 7,166 |
| 12 September 1987 | Chester City | H | 0–1 | | 4,035 |
| 15 September 1987 | Doncaster Rovers | A | 1–2 | Cunningham | 1,558 |
| 19 September 1987 | Brentford | A | 1–2 | Walwyn | 3,886 |
| 26 September 1987 | Preston North End | H | 3–0 | Walwyn, Wrightson o.g., Madden pen. | 8,406 |
| 29 September 1987 | York City | A | 3–1 | Cunningham, Morgan, Madden | 2,559 |
| 3 October 1987 | Fulham | H | 2–1 | Madden (2, 1 pen.) | 4,973 |
| 17 October 1987 | Sunderland | H | 0–2 | | 8,476 |
| 20 October 1987 | Grimsby Town | A | 1–1 | Taylor | 2,260 |
| 24 October 1987 | Wigan Athletic | H | 0–0 | | 4,821 |
| 31 October 1987 | Mansfield Town | A | 0–0 | | 3,221 |
| 3 November 1987 | Bristol City | H | 4–2 | Morgan, Taylor, Madden (2, 1 pen.) | 3,140 |
| 7 November 1987 | Rotherham United | H | 3–0 | Deary, Taylor, Madden | 3,447 |
| 22 November 1987 | Port Vale | A | 0–0 | | 3,594 |
| 28 November 1987 | Northampton Town | H | 3–1 | Cunningham, Walwyn, Morgan | 3,593 |
| 12 December 1987 | Chesterfield | A | 1–1 | Taylor | 2,279 |
| 19 December 1987 | Southend United | H | 1–1 | Walwyn | 3,277 |
| 26 December 1987 | Preston North End | A | 1–2 | Madden | 11,155 |
| 28 December 1987 | Notts County | H | 1–1 | Coughlin | 4,627 |
| 1 January 1988 | Bury | H | 5–1 | Butler, Cunningham, Morgan, Madden, Deary | 4,240 |
| 2 January 1988 | Chester City | A | 1–1 | Madden | 3,093 |
| 16 January 1988 | Brentford | H | 0–1 | | 3,911 |
| 6 February 1988 | Brighton & Hove Albion | H | 1–3 | Lester | 4,081 |
| 13 February 1988 | Notts County | A | 3–2 | Morgan, Taylor (2) | 5,794 |
| 20 February 1988 | Gillingham | H | 3–3 | Coughlin, Taylor, Walwyn | 3,045 |
| 23 February 1988 | Walsall | A | 2–3 | Taylor (2, 1 pen.) | 4,252 |
| 27 February 1988 | Fulham | A | 1–3 | Walwyn | 4,072 |
| 1 March 1988 | York City | H | 2–1 | Taylor, Methven | 2,249 |
| 5 March 1988 | Sunderland | A | 2–2 | Taylor, Walwyn | 15,513 |
| 12 March 1988 | Aldershot | H | 3–2 | Taylor, Walwyn, Cunningham | 2,661 |
| 19 March 1988 | Mansfield Town | H | 2–0 | Taylor (2, 1 pen.) | 2,847 |
| 25 March 1988 | Wigan Athletic | A | 0–0 | | 4,505 |
| 29 March 1988 | Aldershot | A | 0–0 | | 2,091 |
| 2 April 1988 | Rotherham United | A | 1–0 | Deary | 3,001 |
| 4 April 1988 | Port Vale | H | 1–2 | Taylor | 5,516 |
| 9 April 1988 | Bristol City | A | 1–2 | Taylor | 6,460 |
| 15 April 1988 | Doncaster Rovers | H | 4–2 | Madden, Taylor (2), Walwyn | 2,291 |
| 23 April 1988 | Grimsby Town | H | 3–0 | Walwyn, Taylor (2, 1 pen.) | 2,555 |
| 27 April 1988 | Bristol Rovers | A | 0–2 | | 3,546 |
| 30 April 1988 | Northampton Town | A | 3–3 | Walwyn, Methven, Morgan | 5,730 |
| 2 May 1988 | Chesterfield | H | 1–0 | Walwyn | 2,950 |
| 7 May 1988 | Southend United | A | 0–4 | | 5,541 |

=== FA Cup ===
FA Cup match details
| Round | Date | Opponent | Venue | Result F–A | Scorers | Attendance |
|---|---|---|---|---|---|---|
| First round | 14 November 1987 | Bishop Auckland | A | 4–1 | Morgan, Madden pen., Taylor (2) | 2,462 |
| Second round | 6 December 1987 | Northwich Victoria | A | 2–0 | Madden, Walwyn | 2,528 |
| Third round | 9 January 1988 | Scunthorpe United | A | 0–0 | | 6,217 |
| Third round replay | 12 January 1988 | Scunthorpe United | H | 1–0 | Madden | 6,127 |
| Fourth round | 30 January 1988 | Manchester City | H | 1–1 | Sendall | 10,835 |
| Fourth round replay | 3 February 1988 | Manchester City | A | 1–2 | Deary | 26,503 |

=== League Cup ===
League Cup match details
| Round | Date | Opponent | Venue | Result F–A | Scorers | Attendance |
|---|---|---|---|---|---|---|
| First round, first leg | 18 August 1987 | Chester City | H | 2–0 | Cunningham, Methven | 3,114 |
| First round, second leg | 26 August 1987 | Chester City | A | 0–1 | | 2,143 |
| Second round, first leg | 23 September 1987 | Newcastle United | H | 1–0 | Cunningham | 7,691 |
| Second round, second leg | 7 October 1987 | Newcastle United | A | 1–4 | Morgan | 20,808 |

=== Associate Members' Cup ===
Associate Members' Cup match details
| Round | Date | Opponent | Venue | Result F–A | Scorers | Attendance |
|---|---|---|---|---|---|---|
| Group stage | 28 October 1987 | Chester City | A | 1–2 | Greenough o.g. | 1,226 |
| Group stage | 24 November 1987 | Carlisle United | H | 0–1 | | 1,491 |
