= 1988–89 Birmingham City F.C. season =

Birmingham City F.C.
1988–89 season
- Chairman: Ken Wheldon; (until April 1989); Samesh Kumar
- Manager: Garry Pendrey; (until April 1989); Dave Mackay
- Ground: St Andrew's
- Football League Second Division: 23rd (relegated)
- FA Cup: Third round (eliminated by Wimbledon)
- League Cup: Second round (eliminated by Aston Villa)
- Full Members' Cup: First round (eliminated by Aston Villa)
- Top goalscorer: League: Steve Whitton; Colin Robinson (5); All: Steve Whitton (6)
- Highest home attendance: 21,177 vs Aston Villa, League Cup 2nd round, 27 September 1988
- Lowest home attendance: 4,026 vs Swindon Town, 18 April 1989
- Average home league attendance: 6,289
Home colours

The 1988–89 Football League season was Birmingham City Football Club's 86th in the Football League and their 26th in the Second Division. They finished in 23rd position in the division, expanded for this season to 24 teams as part of a restructuring process, so were relegated to the Third Division for the first time in the club's history. They entered the 1988–89 FA Cup in the third round proper and lost to Wimbledon in that round, were eliminated at the second-round stage of the League Cup by local rivals Aston Villa 7–0 over two legs, and lost in the first round of the Full Members' Cup, again to Aston Villa, this time by six goals to nil.

The top scorers in league matches were Steve Whitton and Colin Robinson with five goals apiece; Whitton scored six, if goals scored in all competitions are counted. The average attendance, of 6,289, was the lowest ever at St Andrew's.

In April 1989, Ken Wheldon sold the club to the Kumar brothers, owners of a Manchester-based fashion and leisurewear company. Dave Mackay was brought in as general manager, previous manager Garry Pendrey refused to stay on as part of Mackay's staff, and Wheldon retained a seat on the board while Samesh Kumar became chairman.

== Football League Second Division ==
Date	League position	Opponents	Venue	Result	Score F–A	Scorers	Attendance
27 August 1988	22nd	Watford	A	L	0–1		12,656
3 September 1988	22nd	Leicester City	H	L	2–3	Walsh og, Robinson	7,932
10 September 1988	24th	Oldham Athletic	A	L	0–4		5,810
17 September 1988	20th	Sunderland	H	W	3–2	Childs, Atkins, Robinson	6,871
20 September 1988	22nd	Walsall	A	L	0–5		8,780
24 September 1988	23rd	Blackburn Rovers	A	L	0–3		7,562
1 October 1988	24th	Barnsley	H	L	3–5	Atkins, Robinson, Langley	4,892
4 October 1988	24th	Plymouth Argyle	H	L	0–1		4,435
8 October 1988	22nd	AFC Bournemouth	A	W	1–0	Frain	6,186
15 October 1988	22nd	West Bromwich Albion	H	L	1–4	Bremner	10,453
22 October 1988	24th	Manchester City	A	D	0–0		20,205
25 October 1988	24th	Stoke City	H	L	0–1		6,262
29 October 1988	24th	Swindon Town	A	L	1–2	Atkins pen	6,937
5 November 1988	24th	Portsmouth	H	D	0–0		5,866
12 November 1988	24th	Oxford United	A	L	0–3		5,600
19 November 1988	24th	Hull City	A	D	1–1	Langley	5,134
22 November 1988	24th	Leeds United	H	D	0–0		6,168
26 November 1988	24th	Ipswich Town	H	W	1–0	Whitton	5,932
3 December 1988	24th	Bradford City	A	D	2–2	Whitton, Richards	9,503
10 December 1988	24th	Crystal Palace	H	L	0–1		6,523
16 December 1988	24th	Chelsea	H	L	1–4	Whitton	7,897
26 December 1988	23rd	Shrewsbury Town	A	D	0–0		7,347
31 December 1988	23rd	Brighton & Hove Albion	A	L	0–4		9,324
2 January 1988	23rd	Oldham Athletic	H	D	0–0		5,998
14 January 1989	23rd	Leeds United	A	L	0–1		21,843
21 January 1989	23rd	Watford	H	L	2–3	Whitton 2 (1 pen)	6,396
4 February 1989	23rd	Plymouth Argyle	A	W	1–0	Robinson	7,721
11 February 1989	23rd	AFC Bournemouth	H	L	0–1		6,444
18 February 1989	23rd	Manchester City	H	L	0–2		11,707
25 February 1989	23rd	West Bromwich Albion	A	D	0–0		16,148
28 February 1989	24th	Stoke City	A	L	0–1		7,904
4 March 1989	24th	Oxford United	H	D	0–0	Whitton	4,954
11 March 1989	24th	Portsmouth	A	L	0–1		8,110
18 March 1989	23rd	Walsall	H	W	1–0	Wigley	6,558
25 March 1989	24th	Leicester City	A	L	0–2		9,464
27 March 1989	24th	Shrewsbury Town	H	L	1–2	Sturridge	4,964
1 April 1989	24th	Sunderland	A	D	2–2	Frain, Yates	10,927
4 April 1989	24th	Chelsea	A	L	1–3	Richards	14,796
8 April 1989	24th	Brighton & Hove Albion	H	L	1–2	Sturridge	4,579
15 April 1989	24th	Barnsley	A	D	0–0		6,464
18 April 1989	24th	Swindon Town	H	L	1–2	Peer	4,026
22 April 1989	24th	Blackburn Rovers	H	W	2–0	Robinson, Yates	5,813
29 April 1989	24th	Ipswich Town	A	L	0–4		9,998
1 May 1989	23rd	Bradford City	H	W	1–0	Frain	4,735
6 May 1989	23rd	Hull City	H	W	1–0	Yates	4,686
13 May 1989	23rd	Crystal Palace	A	L	1–4	Sturridge	17,581

=== League table (part) ===
Final Second Division table (part)
Pos	Team	Pld	W	D	L	GF	GA	GD	Pts
20th	Portsmouth	46	13	12	21	53	62	−9	51
21st	Hull City	46	11	14	21	52	68	−16	47
22nd	Shrewsbury Town	46	8	18	20	40	67	−27	42
23rd	Birmingham City	46	8	11	27	31	76	−45	35
24th	Walsall	46	5	16	25	41	80	−39	31

=== Results summary ===
Overall								Home						Away					
Pld	W	D	L	GF	GA	GD	Pts	W	D	L	GF	GA	GD	W	D	L	GF	GA	GD
46	8	11	27	31	76	−45	35	6	4	13	21	33	−12	2	7	14	10	43	−33

== FA Cup ==
Round	Date	Opponents	Venue	Result	Score F–A	Scorers	Attendance
Third round	7 January 1989	Wimbledon	H	L	0–1		10,431

== League Cup ==
Round	Date	Opponents	Venue	Result	Score F–A	Scorers	Attendance
First round 1st leg	30 August 1988	Wolverhampton Wanderers	A	L	2–3	Thompson og, Bird	11,007
First round 2nd leg	6 September 1988	Wolverhampton Wanderers	H	W	1–0	Whitton	8,981
Second round 1st leg	27 September 1988	Aston Villa	H	L	0–2		21,177
Second round 2nd leg	12 October 1988	Aston Villa	A	L	0–5		19,753

== Full Members' Cup ==
Round	Date	Opponents	Venue	Result	Score F–A	Scorers	Attendance
First round	9 November 1988	Aston Villa	A	L	0–6		8,324

== Appearances and goals ==
Numbers in parentheses denote appearances made as a substitute.
Players marked † left the club during the playing season.
Key to positions: GK – Goalkeeper; DF – Defender; MF – Midfielder; FW – Forward

Players' appearances and goals by competition
Pos.	Nat.	Name	League		FA Cup		League Cup		Full Members' Cup		Total	
Pos.	Nat.	Name	Apps	Goals	Apps	Goals	Apps	Goals	Apps	Goals	Apps	Goals
GK	ENG	Tony Elliott †	0	0	0	0	1	0	0	0	1	0
GK	ENG	Tony Godden	7	0	0	0	3	0	0	0	10	0
GK	ENG	Roger Hansbury	3	0	1	0	0	0	0	0	4	0
GK	WAL	Martin Thomas	36	0	0	0	0	0	1	0	37	0
DF	ENG	Kevin Ashley	15	0	1	0	0	0	0	0	15	1
DF	ENG	Adrian Bird	11 (1)	0	0	0	2	1	1	0	14 (1)	1
DF	ENG	Ian Clarkson	9 (1)	0	0	0	2	0	0	0	11 (1)	0
DF	ENG	Matthew Fox	3	0	0	0	0	0	0	0	3	0
DF	ENG	Vince Overson	41	0	1	0	3	0	0	0	45	0
DF	ENG	Ray Ranson †	17	0	0	0	4	0	0	0	21	0
DF	ENG	Brian Roberts	41	0	1	0	3	0	1	0	46	0
DF	ENG	John Trewick †	10 (1)	0	1	0	1	0	0	0	12 (1)	0
MF	ENG	Ian Atkins	43	3	0	0	4	0	1	0	48	3
MF	SCO	Des Bremner	28 (1)	1	1	0	1 (2)	0	1	0	31 (3)	1
MF	ENG	Micky Burton	0 (4)	0	0	0	0	0	0	0	0 (4)	0
MF	ENG	Gary Childs	16 (7)	1	0	0	0 (1)	0	1	0	17 (8)	1
MF	ENG	John Frain	28	3	0	0	3	0	1	0	32	3
MF	ENG	Robert Hopkins	9	0	0	0	0	0	0	0	9	0
MF	ENG	Kevin Langley	34 (2)	2	1	0	3	0	1	0	39 (2)	2
MF	ENG	Ronnie Morris	3 (7)	0	0	0	2 (1)	0	0 (1)	0	5 (9)	0
MF	ENG	Dean Peer	15 (2)	1	0	0	2	0	0	0	17 (2)	1
MF	ENG	Paul Tait	6 (4)	0	1	0	0	0	0	0	7 (4)	0
MF	ENG	Steve Wigley †	33	1	1	0	4	0	1	0	39	1
MF	ENG	Mark Yates	16 (3)	3	0 (1)	0	1	0	1	0	18 (4)	3
FW	ENG	Carl Richards	18 (1)	2	0	0	0	0	0	0	18 (1)	2
FW	ENG	Colin Robinson	31 (2)	5	1	0	4	0	0	0	36 (2)	5
FW	ENG	Guy Russell †	0	0	0	0	0 (1)	0	0	0	0 (1)	0
FW	ENG	Simon Sturridge	13 (8)	3	0	0	0 (1)	0	1	0	14 (9)	3
FW	ENG	Steve Whitton †	23	5	1	0	2 (1)	1	0	0	26 (1)	6

== See also ==
- Birmingham City F.C. seasons

== Sources ==
- Matthews, Tony (1995). Birmingham City: A Complete Record. Derby: Breedon Books. ISBN 978-1-85983-010-9.
- Matthews, Tony (2010). Birmingham City: The Complete Record. Derby: DB Publishing. ISBN 978-1-85983-853-2.
- For match dates, league positions and results: "Birmingham City 1988–1989: Results". Statto Organisation. Archived from the original on 7 April 2011.
- For lineups, appearances, goalscorers and attendances: Matthews (2010), Complete Record, pp. 412–13, 480.
