= Matthew Fox (disambiguation) =

Matthew Fox (born 1966) is an American actor.

Matthew Fox may also refer to:

- Matt Fox (baseball) (born 1982), former baseball pitcher
- Matthew Fox (cyclist) (born 2002), Australian cyclist
- Matthew Fox (footballer) (born 1971), English football defender with Birmingham City and Northampton Town
- Matt Fox (musician) (born 1973), American musician and Shai Hulud guitarist
- Matthew Fox (priest) (born 1940), American Episcopalian (formerly Roman Catholic) priest and author
- Matt Fox (comics) (1906–1988), American illustrator and comic book artist
- Matthew Fox (author), Canadian author and magazine editor
- Matthew M. Fox (1911–1964), American film and television executive
