= 2001–02 West Ham United F.C. season =

English football team season

West Ham United
2001–02 season
- Chairman: Terry Brown
- Manager: Glenn Roeder
- Stadium: Boleyn Ground
- Premier League: 7th
- FA Cup: Fourth round (eliminated by Chelsea)
- League Cup: Second round (eliminated by Reading)
- Top goalscorer: League: Frédéric Kanouté (11); All: Jermain Defoe (14)
- Average home league attendance: 31,359
Home colours	Away colours

During the 2001–02 English football season, West Ham United F.C. competed in the FA Premier League (known as the FA Barclaycard Premiership for sponsorship reasons).

== Final league table ==
Pos	Team	Pld	W	D	L	GF	GA	GD	Pts	Qualification or relegation
5	Leeds United	38	18	12	8	53	37	+16	66	Qualification for the UEFA Cup first round (Note: Since Arsenal qualified for the Champions League, their UEFA Cup place as FA Cup winners defaulted to Chelsea, the losing finalists.)
6	Chelsea	38	17	13	8	66	38	+28	64	Qualification for the UEFA Cup first round
7	West Ham United	38	15	8	15	48	57	−9	53	
8	Aston Villa	38	12	14	12	46	47	−1	50	Qualification for the Intertoto Cup third round
9	Tottenham Hotspur	38	14	8	16	49	53	−4	50	

Source: Premier League
Rules for classification: 1) points; 2) goal difference; 3) number of goals scored.

== Players ==
=== First-team squad ===
Squad at end of season

Note: Flags indicate national team as defined under FIFA eligibility rules; some limited exceptions apply. Players may hold more than one non-FIFA nationality.

No.	Pos.	Nation	Player
1	GK	ENG	David James
2	DF	CZE	Tomáš Řepka
3	DF	ENG	Nigel Winterburn
4	MF	SCO	Don Hutchison (Note: Hutchison was born in Gateshead, England, but also qualified to represent Scotland internationally through his father, and made his international debut for Scotland in March 1999.)
5	DF	SVK	Vladimír Labant
6	DF	AUS	Hayden Foxe
7	DF	SCO	Christian Dailly
8	MF	ENG	Trevor Sinclair
10	FW	ITA	Paolo Di Canio
11	MF	NIR	Steve Lomas (Note: Lomas was born in Hanover, Germany, but also qualified to represent Northern Ireland internationally and made his international debut for Northern Ireland in 1994.)
12	FW	ENG	Paul Kitson
14	FW	FRA	Frédéric Kanouté (Note: Kanouté was born in Sainte-Foy-lès-Lyon, France, and represented them at U-21 level, but also qualified to represent Mali internationally through his father and made his international debut for Mali in 2004.)
15	DF	CMR	Rigobert Song
16	MF	ENG	John Moncur

No.	Pos.	Nation	Player
17	GK	TRI	Shaka Hislop (Note: Hislop was born in Hackney, England, and represented them at U-21 level, but was raised in Trinidad and Tobago and made his international debut for Trinidad and Tobago in 1999.)
19	DF	ENG	Ian Pearce
20	DF	ENG	Scott Minto
21	MF	ENG	Michael Carrick
24	DF	NOR	Ragnvald Soma
25	FW	ENG	Jermain Defoe
26	MF	ENG	Joe Cole
27	DF	IRL	Shaun Byrne (Note: Byrne was born in Taplow, England, but qualifies to represent the Republic of Ireland internationally and has represented them at U-16 and U-21 level.)
28	MF	FRA	Laurent Courtois
29	FW	GUI	Titi Camara
30	DF	FRA	Sébastien Schemmel
33	MF	AUS	Richard Garcia
34	MF	NIR	Grant McCann

=== Left club during season ===
Note: Flags indicate national team as defined under FIFA eligibility rules; some limited exceptions apply. Players may hold more than one non-FIFA nationality.

No.	Pos.	Nation	Player
18	FW	BUL	Svetoslav Todorov (to Portsmouth)
36	MF	ENG	Adam Newton (Note: Newton was born in Ascot, England, and represented them at U-21 level, but also qualified to represent Saint Kitts and Nevis internationally and would make his international debut for Saint Kitts and Nevis in 2004.) (to Peterborough United)
38	MF	ENG	Steven Clark (to Southend United)

No.	Pos.	Nation	Player
39	DF	ENG	Anwar Uddin (to Sheffield Wednesday)
40	DF	AUS	Steve Laurie (to Peterborough United)
—	MF	ITA	Emmanuel Cascione (to Pistoiese)

=== Reserve squad ===
The following players did not appear for the first team this season.

Note: Flags indicate national team as defined under FIFA eligibility rules; some limited exceptions apply. Players may hold more than one non-FIFA nationality.

No.	Pos.	Nation	Player
13	GK	SWE	Sven Andersson
22	GK	CAN	Craig Forrest
23	DF	ENG	Steve Potts
31	FW	TUR	Omer Riza (Note: Rıza was born in Edmonton, England, but qualified to represent Turkey internationally and has represented them at A2 level.)
32	GK	ENG	Stephen Bywater

No.	Pos.	Nation	Player
35	DF	ENG	Gary Charles
37	MF	AUS	Michael Ferrante
39	DF	ENG	Izzy Iriekpen
41	GK	IRL	David Forde
—	MF	ENG	Leon Britton

== Results ==
=== Premier League ===
18 August 2001 1	Liverpool	2–1	West Ham United	Liverpool
15:00 BST	Owen 17', 77'	Report	Di Canio 30' (pen.)	Stadium: Anfield; Attendance: 43,935; Referee: Jeff Winter

25 August 2001 2	West Ham United	0–0	Leeds United	Upton Park, London
15:00 BST		Report		Stadium: Boleyn Ground; Attendance: 24,517; Referee: Paul Durkin

8 September 2001 3	Derby County	0–0	West Ham United	Derby
15:00 BST		Report		Stadium: Pride Park; Attendance: 27,802; Referee: Clive Wilkes

15 September 2001 4	Middlesbrough	2–0	West Ham United	Middlesbrough
15:00 BST	Deane 31'; Johnston 41'	Report		Stadium: Riverside Stadium; Attendance: 25,445; Referee: Mike Riley

23 September 2001 5	West Ham United	3–0	Newcastle United	Upton Park, London
16:00 BST	Hutchison 18'; Di Canio 53'; Kanouté 82'	Report		Stadium: Boleyn Ground; Attendance: 28,840; Referee: Peter Jones

29 September 2001 6	Everton	5–0	West Ham United	Liverpool
15:00 BST	Campbell 45'; Hutchison 52' (o.g.); Gravesen 56'; Watson 75'; Radzinski 79'	Report		Stadium: Goodison Park; Attendance: 32,049; Referee: Paul Durkin

14 October 2001 7	Blackburn Rovers	7–1	West Ham United	Blackburn
14:00 BST	Flitcroft 18'; Dunn 27'; Johnson 28'; McCann 63' (o.g.); Tugay 80'; Jansen 82'; Hignett 90'	Report	Carrick 39'	Stadium: Ewood Park; Attendance: 22,712; Referee: Andy D'Urso

20 October 2001 8	West Ham United	2–0	Southampton	Upton Park, London
15:00 BST	Kanouté 53', 81'	Report		Stadium: Boleyn Ground; Attendance: 25,842; Referee: Neale Barry

24 October 2001 9	West Ham United	2–1	Chelsea	Upton Park, London
19:45 BST	Carrick 5'; Kanouté 13'	Report	Hasselbaink 22'	Stadium: Boleyn Ground; Attendance: 26,520; Referee: Dermot Gallagher

28 October 2001 10	Ipswich Town	2–3	West Ham United	Ipswich
14:00 GMT	Hreiðarsson 63'; Holland 90'	Report	Di Canio 22'; Kanouté 71'; Defoe 90'	Stadium: Portman Road; Attendance: 22,834; Referee: Steve Dunn

3 November 2001 11	West Ham United	0–2	Fulham	Upton Park, London
19:45 GMT		Report	Legwinski 44'; Malbranque 65'	Stadium: Boleyn Ground; Attendance: 26,217; Referee: Graham Barber

19 November 2001 12	Charlton Athletic	4–4	West Ham United	Charlton, London
20:00 GMT	Euell 21', 28'; Johansson 51', 90'	Report	Kitson 3', 30', 64'; Defoe 84'	Stadium: The Valley; Attendance: 23,198; Referee: Alan Wiley

24 November 2001 13	West Ham United	0–1	Tottenham Hotspur	Upton Park, London
15:00 GMT		Report	Ferdinand 50'	Stadium: Boleyn Ground; Attendance: 32,780; Referee: David Elleray

1 December 2001 14	Sunderland	1–0	West Ham United	Sunderland
15:00 GMT	Phillips 85'	Report		Stadium: Stadium of Light; Attendance: 47,437; Referee: Peter Jones

5 December 2001 15	West Ham United	1–1	Aston Villa	Upton Park, London
19:45 GMT	Defoe 90'	Report	Dublin 1'	Stadium: Boleyn Ground; Attendance: 28,377; Referee: Mike Dean

8 December 2001 16	Manchester United	0–1	West Ham United	Manchester
15:00 GMT		Report	Defoe 64'	Stadium: Old Trafford; Attendance: 67,582; Referee: Paul Durkin

15 December 2001 17	West Ham United	1–1	Arsenal	Upton Park, London
15:00 GMT	Kanouté 36'	Report	Cole 39'	Stadium: Boleyn Ground; Attendance: 34,523; Referee: Mike Riley

22 December 2001 18	Leicester City	1–1	West Ham United	Leicester
15:00 GMT	Izzet 43'	Report	Di Canio 74' (pen.)	Stadium: Filbert Street; Attendance: 20,131; Referee: Dermot Gallagher

26 December 2001 19	West Ham United	4–0	Derby County	Upton Park, London
12:00 GMT	Schemmel 5'; Di Canio 73'; Sinclair 86'; Defoe 90'	Report		Stadium: Boleyn Ground; Attendance: 31,379; Referee: Graham Poll

29 December 2001 20	West Ham United	1–1	Liverpool	Upton Park, London
15:00 GMT	Sinclair 39'	Report	Owen 88'	Stadium: Boleyn Ground; Attendance: 35,103; Referee: Rob Styles

1 January 2002 21	Leeds United	3–0	West Ham United	Leeds
20:00 GMT	Viduka 4', 7'; Fowler 50'	Report		Stadium: Elland Road; Attendance: 39,320; Referee: Steve Dunn

12 January 2002 22	West Ham United	1–0	Leicester City	Upton Park, London
15:00 GMT	Di Canio 36'	Report		Stadium: Boleyn Ground; Attendance: 34,698; Referee: Dermot Gallagher

20 January 2002 23	Chelsea	5–1	West Ham United	Fulham, London
14:00 GMT	Hasselbaink 45', 60'; Guðjohnsen 51', 87'; Forssell 90'	Report	Defoe 88'	Stadium: Stamford Bridge; Attendance: 40,035; Referee: Andy D'Urso

30 January 2002 24	Southampton	2–0	West Ham United	Southampton
19:45 GMT	Davies 43'; Fernandes 66'	Report		Stadium: St. Mary's Stadium; Attendance: 31,879; Referee: Phil Dowd

2 February 2002 25	West Ham United	2–0	Blackburn Rovers	Upton Park, London
15:00 GMT	Sinclair 17'; Kanouté 56'	Report		Stadium: Boleyn Ground; Attendance: 35,307; Referee: Peter Jones

9 February 2002 26	Bolton Wanderers	1–0	West Ham United	Horwich
15:00 GMT	Gardner 38'	Report		Stadium: Reebok Stadium; Attendance: 24,342; Referee: David Pugh

23 February 2002 27	West Ham United	1–0	Middlesbrough	Upton Park, London
15:00 GMT	Kanouté 76'	Report		Stadium: Boleyn Ground; Attendance: 35,420; Referee: Chris Foy

2 March 2002 28	Aston Villa	2–1	West Ham United	Birmingham
15:00 GMT	Ángel 23'; Darius Vassell 90'	Report	Di Canio 13', pen.'	Stadium: Villa Park; Attendance: 37,341; Referee: Graham Barber

6 March 2002 29	West Ham United	1–0	Everton	Upton Park, London
19:45 GMT	Sinclair 59'	Report		Stadium: Boleyn Ground; Attendance: 29,883; Referee: Barry Knight

16 March 2002 30	West Ham United	3–5	Manchester United	Upton Park, London
15:00 GMT	Lomas 8'; Kanouté 20'; Defoe 78'	Report	Beckham 17', 89' (pen.); Butt 22'; Scholes 55'; Solskjær 64'	Stadium: Boleyn Ground; Attendance: 35,281; Referee: Mark Halsey

30 March 2002 31	West Ham United	3–1	Ipswich Town	Upton Park, London
15:00 GMT	Lomas 36'; Di Canio 74'; Defoe 86'	Report	M. Bent 71'	Stadium: Boleyn Ground; Attendance: 33,871; Referee: Alan Wiley

1 April 2002 32	Fulham	0–1	West Ham United	Fulham, London
15:00 BST		Report	Kanouté 20'	Stadium: Craven Cottage; Attendance: 19,416; Referee: Mark Halsey

6 April 2002 33	West Ham United	2–0	Charlton Athletic	Upton Park, London
15:00 BST	Di Canio 23', pen.' Kanouté 34'	Report		Stadium: Boleyn Ground; Attendance: 32,389; Referee: Mike Riley

13 April 2002 34	Tottenham Hotspur	1–1	West Ham United	Tottenham, London
15:00 BST	Sheringham 53'	Report	Pearce 89'	Stadium: White Hart Lane; Attendance: 36,083; Referee: Neale Barry

20 April 2002 35	West Ham United	3–0	Sunderland	Upton Park, London
15:00 BST	Sinclair 28'; Lomas 52'; Defoe 77'	Report		Stadium: Boleyn Ground; Attendance: 33,319; Referee: Steve Bennett

24 April 2002 36	Arsenal	2–0	West Ham United	Holloway, London
20:00 BST	Ljungberg 77'; Kanu 80'	Report		Stadium: Highbury; Attendance: 38,038; Referee: Steve Dunn

27 April 2002 37	Newcastle United	3–1	West Ham United	Newcastle-upon-Tyne
15:00 BST	Shearer 41'; LuaLua 53'; Robert 66'	Report	Defoe 20'	Stadium: St. James' Park; Attendance: 52,127; Referee: Paul Durkin

11 May 2002 38	West Ham United	2–1	Bolton Wanderers	Upton Park, London
15:00 BST	Lomas 45'; Pearce 89'	Report	Djorkaeff 67'	Stadium: Boleyn Ground; Attendance: 35,546; Referee: Mike Dean

=== League Cup ===
11 September 2001 Second Round	Reading	0–0 (a.e.t.) (6–5 p)	West Ham United	Reading
19:45 BST		Report		Stadium: Madejski Stadium; Attendance: 21,173; Referee: Bill Jordan
	Penalties
	A. Smith (penalty scored); Murty (penalty scored); Rougier (penalty scored); Harper (penalty missed); Igoe (penalty scored); Henderson (penalty scored); Viveash (penalty scored)		Hutchison (penalty scored); Courtois (penalty scored); Carrick (penalty scored); Sinclair (penalty scored); Defoe (penalty missed); Dailly (penalty scored); Minto (penalty missed)

=== FA Cup ===
6 January 2002 Third Round	Macclesfield Town	0–3	West Ham United	Macclesfield
13:00 GMT		Report	Defoe 45', 72'; Cole 84'	Stadium: Moss Rose; Attendance: 5,706; Referee: Jeff Winter

26 January 2002 Fourth Round	Chelsea	1–1	West Ham United	Fulham, London
15:00 GMT	Hasselbaink 21'	Report	Kanouté 82'	Stadium: Stamford Bridge; Attendance: 33,443; Referee: David Elleray

6 February 2002 Fourth Round Replay	West Ham United	2–3	Chelsea	Upton Park, London
19:45 GMT	Defoe 37', 50'	Report	Hasselbaink 41'; Forssell 65'; Terry 90'	Stadium: Boleyn Ground; Attendance: 27,272; Referee: Graham Poll

== Statistics ==
=== Overview ===
Competition	Record							
Competition	P	W	D	L	GF	GA	GD	Win %
Premier League	38	15	8	15	48	57	−9	39.47
FA Cup	3	1	1	1	6	4	+2	33.33
League Cup	1	0	1	0	0	0	+0	0.00
Total	42	16	10	16	54	61	−7	38.10

=== Goalscorers ===
Rank	Pos	No.	Nat	Name	Premier League	FA Cup	League Cup	Total
1	ST	25	(England)	Jermain Defoe	10	4	0	14
2	ST	14	(France)	Frédéric Kanouté	11	1	0	12
3	ST	10	(Italy)	Paolo Di Canio	9	0	0	9
4	MF	8	(England)	Trevor Sinclair	5	0	0	5
5	MF	11	(Northern Ireland)	Steve Lomas	4	0	0	4
6	ST	9	(England)	Paul Kitson	3	0	0	3
7	DF	19	(England)	Ian Pearce	2	0	0	2
7	MF	21	(England)	Michael Carrick	2	0	0	2
9	MF	4	(Scotland)	Don Hutchison	1	0	0	1
9	MF	26	(England)	Joe Cole	0	1	0	1
9	DF	30	(France)	Sebastien Schemmel	1	0	0	1
Totals					48	6	0	54

=== League position by matchday ===
Matchday	1	2	3	4	5	6	7	8	9	10	11	12	13	14	15	16	17	18	19	20	21	22	23	24	25	26	27	28	29	30	31	32	33	34	35	36	37	38
Ground	A	H	A	A	H	A	A	H	H	A	H	A	H	A	H	A	H	A	H	H	A	H	A	A	H	H	H	A	H	H	H	A	H	H	H	A	A	H
Result	L	D	D	L	W	L	L	W	W	W	L	D	L	L	D	W	D	D	W	D	L	W	L	L	W	L	W	L	W	L	W	W	W	D	W	L	L	W
Position	12	17	17	20	15	18	19	15	14	11	14	15	15	16	16	16	14	15	11	11	11	11	12	14	11	12	10	13	10	10	10	8	7	7	7	7	8	7

A = Away; H = Home; W = Win; D = Draw; L = Loss

=== Appearances and goals ===
No.	Pos	Nat	Player	Total		Premier League		FA Cup		League Cup	
No.	Pos	Nat	Player	Apps	Goals	Apps	Goals	Apps	Goals	Apps	Goals
Goalkeepers
1	GK	(England) ENG	David James	29	0	26	0	3	0	0	0
17	GK	(Trinidad and Tobago) TRI	Shaka Hislop	13	0	12	0	0	0	1	0
Defenders
2	DF	(Czech Republic) CZE	Tomáš Řepka	34	0	31	0	3	0	0	0
3	DF	(England) ENG	Nigel Winterburn	34	0	29+2	0	3	0	0	0
5	DF	(Slovakia) SVK	Vladimír Labant	14	0	7+5	0	0+2	0	0	0
6	DF	(Australia) AUS	Hayden Foxe	7	0	4+2	0	0+1	0	0	0
7	DF	(Scotland) SCO	Christian Dailly	42	0	38	0	3	0	1	0
15	DF	(Cameroon) CMR	Rigobert Song	6	0	5	0	0	0	1	0
19	DF	(England) ENG	Ian Pearce	9	2	8+1	2	0	0	0	0
20	DF	(England) ENG	Scott Minto	6	0	5	0	0	0	1	0
24	DF	(Norway) NOR	Ragnvald Soma	4	0	1+2	0	1	0	0	0
27	DF	(Republic of Ireland) IRL	Shaun Byrne	1	0	0+1	0	0	0	0	0
30	DF	(France) FRA	Sebastian Schemmel	39	1	35	1	3	0	1	0
Midfielders
4	MF	(Scotland) SCO	Don Hutchison	28	1	24	1	3	0	1	0
8	MF	(England) ENG	Trevor Sinclair	37	5	34	5	2	0	1	0
11	MF	(Northern Ireland) NIR	Steve Lomas	17	4	14+1	4	1+1	0	0	0
16	MF	(England) ENG	John Moncur	21	0	7+12	0	1	0	1	0
21	MF	(England) ENG	Michael Carrick	32	2	30	2	1	0	1	0
26	MF	(England) ENG	Joe Cole	33	1	29+1	0	3	1	0	0
28	MF	(France) FRA	Laurent Courtois	8	0	5+2	0	0	0	0+1	0
33	MF	(Australia) AUS	Richard Garcia	9	0	2+6	0	0	0	0+1	0
34	MF	(Northern Ireland) NIR	Grant McCann	3	0	0+3	0	0	0	0	0
Forwards
10	FW	(Italy) ITA	Paolo Di Canio	27	9	26	9	1	0	0	0
12	FW	(England) ENG	Paul Kitson	9	3	3+4	3	2	0	0	0
14	FW	(France) FRA	Frédéric Kanouté	28	12	27	11	1	1	0	0
25	FW	(England) ENG	Jermain Defoe	39	13	14+21	10	2+1	3	1	0
29	FW	(Guinea) GUI	Titi Camara	1	0	0+1	0	0	0	0	0
Players transferred out during the season
18	FW	(Bulgaria) BUL	Svetoslav Todorov	8	0	2+4	0	0+1	0	1	0

== Transfers ==
=== In ===
Date	Pos.	Name	From	Fee
4 July 2001	RB	(France) Sebastien Schemmel	(England) FC Metz	£465,000
11 July 2001	GK	(England) David James	(England) Aston Villa	£4,300,000
7 August 2001	MF	(France) Laurent Courtois	(France) Toulouse	Free
30 August 2001	MF	(Scotland) Don Hutchison	(England) Sunderland	£5,000,000
14 September 2001	DF	(Czech Republic) Tomáš Řepka	(Italy) Fiorentina	£5,500,000
25 November 2001	GK	(Sweden) Sven Andersson	(Sweden) Helsingborgs IF	Free
11 January 2002	DF	(Slovakia) Vladimír Labant	(Czech Republic) Sparta Prague	£1,200,000
1 February 2002	GK	(Republic of Ireland) David Forde	(Wales) Barry Town	£15,000

=== Out ===
Date	Pos.	Name	To	Fee
14 June 2001	MF	(England) Frank Lampard	(England) Chelsea	£11,000,000
20 June 2001	DF	(England) Stuart Pearce	(England) Manchester City	Free
5 July 2001	FW	(Nigeria) Amos Foyewa	(England) Bournemouth	Free
11 July 2001	DF	(England) Stevland Angus	(England) Cambridge United	Free
13 July 2001	DF	(Croatia) Igor Štimac	(Croatia) Hajduk Split	Free
14 July 2001	DF	(England) Terrell Forbes	(England) Queens Park Rangers	Free
9 August 2001	FW	(England) Gavin Holligan	(England) Wycombe Wanderers	Free
16 November 2001	FW	(Croatia) Davor Šuker	(Germany) 1860 Munich	Free
17 January 2002	DF	(Australia) Steve Laurie	(England) Peterborough United	Free
25 January 2002	MF	(England) Steven Clark	(England) Southend United	£15,000
27 February 2002	DF	(England) Anwar Uddin	(England) Sheffield Wednesday	Free
19 March 2002	FW	(Bulgaria) Svetoslav Todorov	(England) Portsmouth	£750,000
1 May 2002	DF	(England) Adam Newton	(England) Peterborough United	Free
