= Schemmel =

Schemmel is a surname. Notable people with the surname include:

- Jerry Schemmel (born 1959), American sportscaster
- Sean Schemmel (born 1968), American voice actor, ADR director and screenwriter
- Sébastien Schemmel (born 1975), French footballer
