= Trevor Sinclair =

English footballer

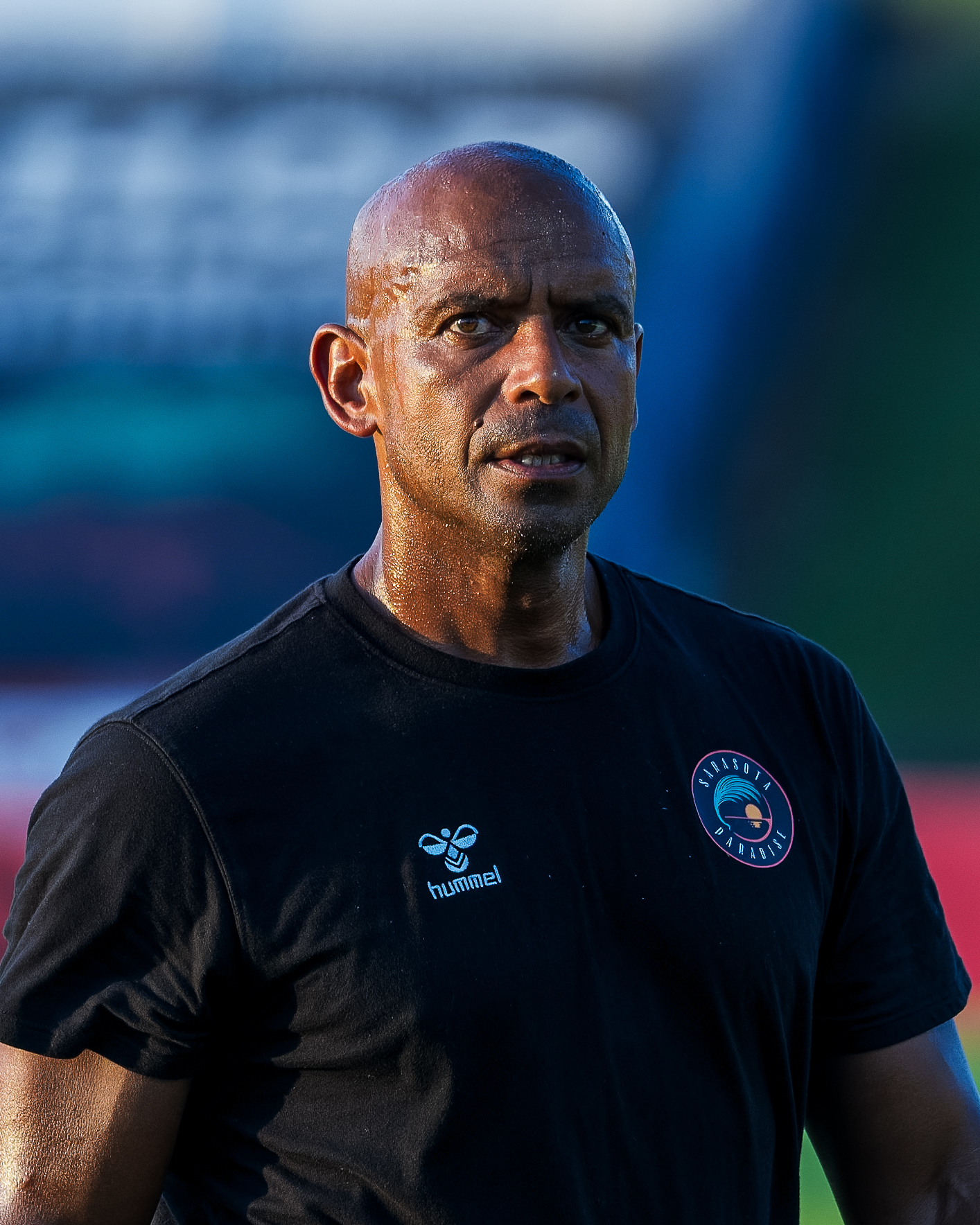
- Sinclair with Sarasota Paradise in 2026

Personal information
- Full name: Trevor Lloyd Sinclair
- Date of birth: 2 March 1973 (age 53)
- Place of birth: Dulwich, England
- Height: 5 ft 10 in (1.78 m)
- Position: Left winger

Youth career
- –1989: Blackpool

Senior career*
Years	Team	Apps	(Gls)
1989–1993	Blackpool	112	(15)
1993–1998	Queens Park Rangers	167	(16)
1998–2003	West Ham United	177	(37)
2003–2007	Manchester City	82	(5)
2007–2008	Cardiff City	21	(1)
2014–2015	Lancaster City	1	(0)
2018	Squires Gate	1	(0)
Total		561	(74)

International career
1993–1998	England U21	14	(5)
1998	England B	1	(0)
2001–2003	England	12	(0)
- * Club domestic league appearances and goals

Trevor Lloyd Sinclair (born 2 March 1973) is an English football coach, former professional footballer and pundit.

As a player, he was a left winger who notably played in the Premier League for Queens Park Rangers, West Ham United and Manchester City. He also played in the Football League for Blackpool and Cardiff City where he retired in 2008. He has since come out of retirement on two occasions and has featured for non-league sides Lancaster City in 2014 and Squires Gate in 2018.

He was capped twelve times by England, four of which came in the 2002 FIFA World Cup. He won the 1997 Match of the Day Goal of the Season after scoring a bicycle kick in an FA Cup tie against Barnsley. Following his retirement, Sinclair largely worked as a pundit on both television and radio, most notably for BBC Sport on Football Focus and Final Score. During the 2014–15 season, he was named assistant manager of Lancaster City, who he briefly came out of retirement with. In 2018 he played a single game for Squires Gate.

== Club career ==
=== Blackpool ===
Sinclair was born in Dulwich, London, but grew up in Manchester. He began his career at Blackpool where he played from 1989 to 1993. When he made his debut for Blackpool, on 19 August 1989, he became the club's youngest ever player, at 16 years, five months, breaking Colin Greenall's record set nine years earlier. Sinclair's record was in turn broken by Matty Kay in November 2006.

Sinclair was inducted into the Hall of Fame at Bloomfield Road when it was officially opened by former Blackpool player Jimmy Armfield in April 2006. Organised by the Blackpool Supporters Association, Blackpool fans around the world voted on their all-time heroes. Five players from each decade are inducted; Sinclair is in the 1990s.

He made 112 league appearances for the Seasiders, scoring 15 goals.

=== Queens Park Rangers ===
In 1993, Sinclair moved to Queens Park Rangers for £600,000, a figure which broke Blackpool's record transfer sale. He won the October 1995 Premier League Player of the Month award, although he was unable to prevent QPR from being relegated from the Premier League that season. Throughout the 1995-96 season, Sinclair's name was constantly linked with a move to several of the Premier League's leading clubs, namely Leeds United, Manchester United and Newcastle United - with fees of up to £6million being mentioned.

In May 1997, he won the BBC's Match of the Day "Goal of the Season" competition with a bicycle kick from outside the penalty area whilst playing for QPR in an FA Cup match against Barnsley.

=== West Ham United ===
In January 1998, Sinclair moved to West Ham United for a combined fee of £2.3 million; £2.7 million minus West Ham players Iain Dowie and Keith Rowland moving to Q.P.R as part of the deal. He scored seven goals in the remaining 14 games to help West Ham achieve an eighth-place finish in the Premier League. He was a regular over the next two seasons, but a serious knee injury ruled him out of the final four months of the 2000–01 season. His absence coincided with a loss of form for the team, and by the end of the season manager Harry Redknapp had been sacked. Sinclair recovered in time for the 2001–02 season and featured 34 times, often on the left wing, as he won his bid to play at the World Cup for England in that position.

2002–03 was Sinclair's final season with West Ham. They were relegated at the end of the season. Forced to cut costs, West Ham accepted a £3.3m bid for the player from Manchester City.

In total Sinclair spent five years at Upton Park, playing in a variety of positions including wingback, left and right wing and as a striker when called upon. He made 177 league appearances and scored 37 goals including two goals on his West Ham debut, on 31 January 1998, in a 2–2 home draw against Everton.

=== Manchester City ===
After West Ham's relegation, Sinclair joined Manchester City in 2003 for £3.3 million, and went on to score City's first competitive goal at the new City of Manchester Stadium in a UEFA Cup tie against Welsh side Total Network Solutions.

At the beginning of his career at Manchester City, he played on the left wing, where he had performed for England at the 2002 FIFA World Cup. However, the departure of Shaun Wright-Phillips presented the opportunity for Sinclair to play on his preferred right wing.

Sinclair was released by Manchester City at the end of the 2006–07 season.

=== Cardiff City ===
On 10 July 2007, he joined Championship club, Cardiff City. He began the season as a first-team player, scoring his first Cardiff goal on 24 September in a 4–2 win in the League Cup over West Bromwich Albion. Early on in the season, he suffered from a buildup of fluid in his knee and underwent two operations on the injury which ruled him out until mid-February. He made his return on 16 February 2008 coming on as a late substitute in a 2–0 FA Cup victory over Wolverhampton Wanderers.

On 12 April 2008, Sinclair faced his first club, Blackpool, for the first time since leaving them fifteen years earlier. He scored Cardiff's second goal in a 3–1 win; however, he refused to celebrate his goal. On 17 May he made an 86th-minute substitute appearance in the 2008 FA Cup Final at Wembley Stadium, which Cardiff lost 1–0 to Portsmouth. However, four days later it was announced that his contract would not be renewed for the forthcoming season and he was released.

=== Squires Gate ===
On 21 February 2018, he joined North West Counties Football Premier League club Squires Gate at the age of 44 after a 2014–15 season at Lancaster City.

== International career ==
In 1994, Sinclair was called up to the Republic of Ireland squad by Jack Charlton, but was unable to declare for his mother's homeland as he had already played at U21 level for England. This meant he missed out on the World Cup on 1994. Sinclair was called up to Terry Venables' get-together England squad in April 1995, and again by Kevin Keegan in 1999, but was not capped for the senior side until 2001. Sinclair earned 12 caps for England, four of which came in the 2002 World Cup, in which he was a last-minute replacement for the injured Danny Murphy. In turn, he replaced Owen Hargreaves, who was injured early in the competition, in the team and was widely regarded as one of England's best players in the tournament, doing a job on England's then "problem left hand side".

== Coaching career ==
Sinclair was the assistant manager of Lancaster City. On 25 August 2014, he made a substitute appearance in the second half of a 3–1 defeat to Clitheroe in the league.

As of October 2021, Sinclair runs a football academy with Bamber Bridge manager Jamie Milligan.

In January 2024, Sinclair was appointed as an assistant coach for the men's India national team.

In January 2026, he was announced as an assistant coach for USL 1 Sarasota Paradise.

== Media career ==
Following his retirement, Sinclair largely worked as a pundit on both television and radio, most notably for BBC Sport on Football Focus and Final Score.

Sinclair has worked as a sports commentator, notably on Talksport.

== Personal life ==
Sinclair is of partial Irish and Scottish descent through his mother, who was born in Sligo and Jamaican descent through his birth father. His stepfather was from Glasgow. He lives on the Fylde coast and is a supporter of his previous clubs West Ham, Manchester City, Blackpool and QPR, as well as Scottish club Celtic. In February 2015, he said that three of his children had joined Blackpool's academy. His eldest son, Isaac plays for Accrington Stanley. His middle son, Sky, was named as an under-21 player in Blackpool's squad for the 2021–22 EFL Championship campaign. He signed a professional contract at the end of the previous campaign. Sinclair's youngest son, Kobe, began a scholarship with Blackpool in 2021.

=== Controversies ===
In January 1999, Sinclair was convicted of causing criminal damage to a car, following a night of drinking with other West Ham players at the club's Christmas party in Romford.

In November 2017, Sinclair was arrested on suspicion of drink driving, common assault and criminal damage after a woman was hit by a car in Lytham St Annes. On 2 January 2018, Sinclair was convicted of drink driving, urinating in a police car and racially abusing a police officer by calling him a 'white cunt'. He was sentenced to 150 hours of unpaid work, disqualified from driving for 20 months and ordered to pay £500 compensation to the abused police officer. Following this conviction, he was subsequently fired from his role as a BBC pundit.

Following the death of Elizabeth II, Sinclair tweeted asking why "black and brown" people should mourn. His comments were met with widespread condemnation, including that of his fellow Talksport colleague Simon Jordan. Talksport subsequently announced that Sinclair would not be featured on air at the station whilst an investigation into the tweet was carried out. Sinclair returned from his suspension to feature on the station for one further time in January 2023 but would not be featured on TalkSport thereafter.

== Career statistics ==
=== Club ===
Appearances and goals by club, season and competition
Club	Season	League			FA Cup		League Cup		Other		Total	
Club	Season	Division	Apps	Goals	Apps	Goals	Apps	Goals	Apps	Goals	Apps	Goals
Blackpool	1989–90	Third Division	9	0	0	0	0	0	0	0	9	0
Blackpool	1990–91	Fourth Division	31	1	3	0	2	0	5 (Note: Three appearances and one goal in Football League Trophy, two in Fourth Division play-offs)	1	41	2
Blackpool	1991–92	Fourth Division	27	3	2	0	2	0	5	0	36	3
Blackpool	1992–93	Second Division	45	11	2	0	4	0	3 (Note: Appearances in Football League Trophy)	0	54	11
Blackpool	Total		112	15	7	0	8	0	13	1	140	16
Queens Park Rangers	1993–94	Premier League	32	4	1	0	3	1	—		36	5
Queens Park Rangers	1994–95	Premier League	33	4	1	0	3	1	—		37	5
Queens Park Rangers	1995–96	Premier League	37	2	2	1	3	1	—		42	4
Queens Park Rangers	1996–97	First Division	39	3	4	1	2	0	—		45	4
Queens Park Rangers	1997–98	First Division	26	3	2	0	2	0	—		30	3
Queens Park Rangers	Total		167	16	10	2	13	3	—		190	21
West Ham United	1997–98	Premier League	14	7	—		—		—		14	7
West Ham United	1998–99	Premier League	36	7	2	0	2	0	—		40	7
West Ham United	1999–2000	Premier League	36	7	1	0	4	0	10 (Note: Ten appearances and one goal in UEFA Intertoto Cup, four in UEFA Cup)	1	51	8
West Ham United	2000–01	Premier League	19	3	1	0	3	0	—		23	3
West Ham United	2001–02	Premier League	34	5	2	0	1	0	—		37	5
West Ham United	2002–03	Premier League	38	8	2	0	1	0	—		41	8
West Ham United	Total		177	37	8	0	11	0	10	1	206	38
Manchester City	2003–04	Premier League	29	1	4	0	2	0	3 (Note: Appearances in UEFA Cup)	1	38	2
Manchester City	2004–05	Premier League	4	1	0	0	1	0	—		5	1
Manchester City	2005–06	Premier League	31	3	3	0	0	0	—		34	3
Manchester City	2006–07	Premier League	18	0	2	0	1	0	—		21	0
Manchester City	Total		82	5	9	0	4	0	3	1	98	6
Cardiff City	2007–08	Championship	21	1	4	0	1	1	—		26	2
Career total			559	74	38	2	37	4	26	3	660	83

=== International ===
Appearances and goals by national team and year
National team	Year	Apps	Goals
England	2001	1	0
England	2002	9	0
England	2003	2	0
Total		12	0

== Honours ==
Blackpool

- Football League Fourth Division play-offs: 1992

West Ham United

- UEFA Intertoto Cup: 1999

Cardiff City

- FA Cup runner-up: 2007–08

England U21

- Toulon Tournament: 1994

Individual

- Premier League Player of the Month: October 1995
- PFA Team of the Year: 1996–97 First Division
