= 1996–97 Queens Park Rangers F.C. season =

English football club season

Queens Park Rangers
1996–97 season
- Chairman: Chris Wright
- Manager: Ray Wilkins (until 3 September); Stewart Houston (from 16 September)
- Stadium: Loftus Road
- First Division: 9th
- FA Cup: Fifth round
- League Cup: Second round
- Top goalscorer: League: John Spencer (17); All: John Spencer (18)
- Highest home attendance: 17,376 (vs. Wolverhampton Wanderers, 31 March)
- Lowest home attendance: 7,354 (vs. Stoke City, 2 November)
- Average home league attendance: 12,554
- Biggest win: 4-0 Vs Southend United (14 December 1996)
- Biggest defeat: 1-4 Vs West Bromwich Albion (28 December 1996)
Home colours	Away colours

During the 1996–97 English football season, Queens Park Rangers competed in the Football League First Division.

== Season summary ==
In August 1996, media tycoon Chris Wright, a QPR fan for 20 years, bought the club and also stated his plans for London Wasps to distribute the stadium.

Wright later suggested forming a new Loftus Road plc, including both QPR and London Wasps, on the Alternative Investment Market. A month later, Ray Wilkins left the club by mutual consent after a board meeting when he wanted money in an attempt to sign 34-year-old Ghana skipper Abedi Pele as well as being pushed to retire from his playing career. Ex-Arsenal caretaker manager Stewart Houston took over the reins with former Arsenal manager Bruce Rioch as his assistant.

Houston's first signing for QPR broke the club's previous transfer record when Scottish international striker John Spencer was signed from Chelsea for £2.35 million in November 1996. A month later, his ex-Chelsea teammate and former QPR player Gavin Peacock rejoined the club for a second spell. Northern Ireland international Steve Morrow also joined from Arsenal.

Ultimately, QPR's poor home form during the season cost them a chance of a play-off place and they finished 9th, five points outside the play-off places.

== Kit ==
View From remained as QPR's kit manufacturers. Telecommunications giant Ericsson replaced Compaq as kit sponsors.

== Final league table ==
Pos	Team	Pld	W	D	L	GF	GA	GD	Pts
7	Portsmouth	46	20	8	18	59	53	+6	68
8	Port Vale	46	17	16	13	58	55	+3	67
9	Queens Park Rangers	46	18	12	16	64	60	+4	66
10	Birmingham City	46	17	15	14	52	48	+4	66
11	Tranmere Rovers	46	17	14	15	63	56	+7	65

Rules for classification: 1) Points; 2) Goals scored; 3) Goal difference

== Results ==
Queens Park Rangers' score comes first

=== Legend ===
Win	Draw	Loss

=== Football League First Division ===
Date	Opponents	Venue	Result F–A	Scorers	Attendance	Position
17 August 1996	Oxford United	H	2–1	Gallen, Dichio	14,703	6
23 August 1996	Portsmouth	A	2–1	Gallen (2)	7,501	4
28 August 1996	Wolverhampton Wanderers	A	1–1	Dichio	25,767	6
1 September 1996	Bolton Wanderers	H	1–2	McDonald	11,225	6
7 September 1996	West Bromwich Albion	H	0–2		12,886	10
11 September 1996	Norwich City	A	1–1	Impey	14,000	10
14 September 1996	Barnsley	A	3–1	Barker, Perry, Dichio	13,003	6
21 September 1996	Swindon Town	H	1–1	Murray 27'	13,662	9
28 September 1996	Birmingham City	A	0–0		17,430	12
2 October 1996	Port Vale	H	1–2	Barker	8,727	13
5 October 1996	Grimsby Town	A	0–2		5,472	13
12 October 1996	Manchester City	H	2–2	Sinclair 22', Murray 30'	16,265	12
16 October 1996	Bradford City	H	1–0	Brazier	7,776	11
20 October 1996	Tranmere Rovers	A	3–2	Slade, McDonald, Charles	7,025	8
26 October 1996	Sheffield United	A	1–1	Slade	17,096	9
30 October 1996	Ipswich Town	H	0–1		10,562	9
2 November 1996	Stoke City	H	1–1	Sinclair	7,354	11
10 November 1996	Crystal Palace	A	0–3		15,324	12
16 November 1996	Charlton Athletic	H	1–2	Sinclair	12,360	15
23 November 1996	Reading	A	1–2	Spencer	12,847	19
30 November 1996	Sheffield United	H	1–0	Barker (pen)	11,891	16
7 December 1996	Oldham Athletic	A	2–0	Peacock, Spencer	5,590	14
14 December 1996	Southend United	H	4–0	Barker (pen), Harris (own goal), Spencer, Peacock	11,117	11
21 December 1996	Huddersfield Town	A	2–1	Dichio 45', Brazier	10,718	7
26 December 1996	Norwich City	H	3–2	Peacock, Dichio, McDermott	15,699	6
28 December 1996	West Bromwich Albion	A	1–4	Spencer	19,061	7
1 January 1997	Swindon Town	A	PP			
11 January 1997	Barnsley	H	3–1	Spencer (3)	12,058	6
19 January 1997	Port Vale	A	4–4	Holwyn (own goal), Impey, Murray, Spencer	5,736	7
29 January 1997	Birmingham City	H	1–1	Spencer	12,138	7
1 February 1997	Crystal Palace	H	0–1		16,467	10
5 February 1997	Swindon Town	A	1–1	Hateley 41'	10,830	7
8 February 1997	Ipswich Town	A	0–2		12,983	10
19 February 1997	Reading	H	PP			
22 February 1997	Stoke City	A	0–0		13,121	12
1 March 1997	Oldham Athletic	H	0–1		10,180	13
4 March 1997	Charlton Athletic	A	1–2	Dichio	10,610	13
8 March 1997	Huddersfield Town	H	2–0	McDermott, Spencer	9,789	13
12 March 1997	Reading	H	0–2		10,316	13
15 March 1997	Southend United	A	1–0	Roget (own goal)	6,747	13
22 March 1997	Portsmouth	H	2–1	Murray, Spencer	15,746	11
29 March 1997	Oxford United	A	3–2	Yates, Spencer, Peacock	8,365	12
31 March 1997	Wolverhampton Wanderers	H	2–2	Spencer, Peacock	17,376	10
5 April 1997	Bolton Wanderers	A	1–2	Morrow	19,198	12
12 April 1997	Grimsby Town	H	3–0	Spencer, Murray, Slade	10,765	11
19 April 1997	Manchester City	A	3–0	Spencer 49', 53' Slade 76'	27,580	9
26 April 1997	Tranmere Rovers	H	2–0	Dichio, Spencer	14,859	7
4 May 1997	Bradford City	A	0–3		14,723	9

=== FA Cup ===
Round	Date	Opponent	Venue	Result F–A	Attendance	Scorers
R3	4 January 1997	Huddersfield Town (First Division)	H	1–1	11,776	Hateley 88'
R3R	14 January 1997	Huddersfield Town (First Division)	A	2–1	11,814	Peacock 26', McDonald 89'
R4	25 January 1997	Barnsley (First Division)	H	3–2	14,317	Peacock 20', Spencer 26', Sinclair 74'
R5	15 February 1997	Wimbledon (FA Premiership)	A	1–2	22,395	Hateley 41'

=== Coca-Cola Cup ===
Round	Date	Opponent	Venue	Result F–A	Attendance	Scorers
R2 First Leg	18 September 1996	Swindon Town (First Division)	A	2–1	7,843	Dichio 77', Impey 79'
R2 Second Leg	25 September 1996	Swindon Town (First Division)	H	1–3 (lost 3–4 on agg)	6,976	Brazier 55'

=== Friendlies ===
Date	Opponents	Venue	Result F–A	Scorers	Attendance
24-Jul-96	Millwall v Queens Park Rangers	A			
26-Jul-96	Wycombe Wanderers v Queens Park Rangers	A			
30-Jul-96	Barnet v Queens Park Rangers	A			
2-Aug-96	Brentford v Queens Park Rangers	A			
3-Aug-96	Leyton Orient v Queens Park Rangers	A			
6-Aug-96	Fulham v Queens Park Rangers	A			
10-Aug-96	Queens Park Rangers v Wimbledon	H			

== Squad ==
Position	Nationality	Name	League Appearances	League Goals	Cup Appearances	Coca-Cola Cup Goals	F.A.Cup Goals	Total Appearances	Total Goals
GK	USA	Juergen Sommer	33		3			36	
GK	WAL	Tony Roberts	13		3			16	
DF	ENG	Danny Maddix	18		2			27	
DF	ENG	Trevor Challis	2					2	
DF	WAL	Karl Ready	28		4			33	
DF	NIR	Alan McDonald	38	2	5		1	44	3
DF	ENG	Rufus Brevett	44		6			50	
DF	ENG	Matt Brazier	22	2	3	1		30	3
DF	ENG	Matt Jackson	7					7	
DF	NIR	Steve Morrow	5	1				5	1
DF	ENG	Steve Yates	16	1	1			17	1
DF	ENG	Chris Plummer	4		2			7	
MF	ENG	Ray Wilkins	4					4	
MF	ENG	Paul Murray	26	5	5			37	5
MF	ENG	Andrew Impey	26	2	3	1		36	3
MF	ENG	Simon Barker	38	4	4			42	4
MF	ENG	Mark Perry	2	1				2	1
MF	ENG	Gavin Peacock	27	5	4		2	31	7
MF	ENG	Trevor Sinclair	39	3	7		1	46	4
MF	ENG	Mark Graham	16		4			22	
FW	ENG	Mark Hateley	8	1	2		2	17	3
FW	ENG	Kevin Gallen	2	3				2	3
FW	ENG	Nigel Quashie	9					14	
FW	ENG	Michael Mahoney-Johnson						2	
FW	AUS	Andy McDermott	6	2				6	2
FW	SCO	John Spencer	25	17	4		1	29	18
FW	ENG	Steve Slade	11	4				16	4
FW	ENG	Lee Charles	6	1				13	1
FW	ENG	Danny Dichio	31	7	4	1		43	8

== Transfers Out ==
Name	from	Date	Fee	Date	Club	Fee
Gregory Goodridge	Torquay United	9 August 1995	£100,000	August 1996	Bristol City	£50,000
Mark Hateley	Rangers	3 November 1995	£1,500,000	August 1996	Leeds United	Loan
Michael Mahoney-Johnson	Queens Park Rangers Juniors	April 1995		August 1996	Wycombe Wanderers	Loan
Matthew Jackson	Everton	19 Aug 1996	Loan	Sep 96	Everton	Loan
Ray Wilkins	Crystal Palace	November 1994	Free	September 1996	Wycombe Wanderers	Free
Sieb Dijkstra	Motherwell	12 July 1994	£250,000	Dec 96	Dundee United	£50,000
Lee Sharp	Lincoln United	23 Oct 1995	Nominal	Feb 97	Retired (Inj.)	
Andy McDermott	Australian Institute of Sport	5 August 1995	£20,000	March 1997	West Bromwich Albion	£400,000

== Transfers In ==
Name	from	Date	Fee
Steve Slade	Tottenham	12 July 1996	£350,000
Paul Bruce	Queens Park Rangers Juniors	15 July 1996	
Matt Jackson	Everton	19 Aug 1996	Loan
Karl Owen	Queens Park Rangers Juniors	Oct1996	
John Spencer	Chelsea	21 Nov 1996	£2,500,000
Gavin Peacock	Chelsea	21 Nov 1996	£800,000
Richard Langley	Queens Park Rangers Juniors	31 Dec 1996	
Steve Morrow	Arsenal	27 Mar 1997	£1,000,000
David Whittle	Queens Park Rangers Juniors	1 Mar 1997	
Wayne Purser	Queens Park Rangers Juniors	21 Apr 1997	
Matthew Rose	Arsenal	19 May 1997	£500,000
Paul Hart	Queens Park Rangers Juniors	May1997	
Mario Lusardi	Queens Park Rangers Juniors	May1997	
Rik Lopez	Queens Park Rangers Juniors	May1997	
Richard Graham	Queens Park Rangers Juniors	June1997	
Lee Harper	Arsenal	6 June 1997	£125,000
Jeff Woolsey	Arsenal	June1997	Free
Fraser Murray	Queens Park Rangers Juniors	June1997	
