= Andy Garner =

English footballer and coach

Personal information
- Full name: Andrew Garner
- Date of birth: 8 March 1966 (age 60)
- Place of birth: Stonebroom, England
- Height: 6 ft 0 in (1.83 m)
- Positions: Midfielder; centre forward

Team information
- Current team: Mansfield Town (first-team coach)

Senior career*
Years	Team	Apps	(Gls)
1983–1988	Derby County	71	(17)
1988–1992	Blackpool	160	(37)
1992–1997	Gresley Rovers		
1997–2005	Burton Albion		
Total			(107)
- * Club domestic league appearances and goals

Andrew Garner (born 8 March 1966) is an English former professional footballer who played in the Football League for Derby County and Blackpool. He is a first-team coach at Mansfield Town.

== Playing career ==
Born in Stonebroom, Derbyshire, Garner began his career as an apprentice with Derby County in 1983. He scored some vital goals in the Rams' Division Three promotion season of 1985–86.

In August 1988, Garner joined Sam Ellis's Blackpool for £75,000. He made his debut on opening day, 27 August, in a 1–1 draw at Chester City. Jimmy Mullen took over the manager's seat for 1989–90 and moved Garner into a central-midfield position, where he went on to enjoy more success in a partnership with Paul Groves, although he couldn't help the Seasiders avoid relegation to the Football League's basement division.

Under Billy Ayre, and after Blackpool's failure in the Fourth Division playoff final of 1990–91, Garner was the subject of intense transfer speculation, and it seemed almost certain that he would leave for pastures new. However, the proposed move fell through and he remained at the club for another season, which saw another Wembley playoff final, this time ending in success for Blackpool.

Garner managed to make only seven appearances during the 1992–93 season before joining Gresley Rovers.

== Blackpool F.C. Hall of Fame ==
Garner was inducted into the Hall of Fame at Bloomfield Road, when it was officially opened by former Blackpool player Jimmy Armfield in April 2006. Organised by the Blackpool Supporters Association, Blackpool fans around the world voted on their all-time heroes. Five players from each decade are inducted; Garner is in the 1980s.

== Post-retirement ==
Garner is now a football coach. He has been the first-team coach at his first club, Derby County.

In 2013 Garner followed Nigel Clough to Sheffield United.

After mixed results at Sheffield United, Garner followed Nigel Clough and returned to previous club Burton Albion in 2015 in a coaching role. Subsequently, Burton Albion have achieved promotion to the Championship for the first time in their history.

In November 2020, he joined Mansfield Town as first team coach.

== Honours ==
Derby County

- Football League Second Division: 1986–87
- Football League Third Division promotion: 1985–86

Blackpool

- Football League Fourth Division play-offs: 1992

Gresley Rovers

- Southern Football League Premier Division: 1996–97
