= Micky Burton =

English footballer

Personal information
- Full name: Michael James Burton
- Date of birth: 5 November 1969 (age 56)
- Place of birth: Kings Heath, Birmingham, England
- Height: 5 ft 9 in (1.75 m)
- Position: Midfielder

Youth career
- 1986–1987: Birmingham City

Senior career*
Years	Team	Apps	(Gls)
1987–1991	Birmingham City	4	(0)
1991	Sheffield Wednesday	0	(0)
1991–1992	Shrewsbury Town	6	(0)
1992	Moor Green		
1992	Milton Keynes Borough		
1992–199?	Moor Green		
–	Bromsgrove Rovers		
1994	Solihull Borough		
1994–199?	Redditch United		
- * Club domestic league appearances and goals

Michael James Burton (born 5 November 1969) is an English former professional footballer who played in the Football League for Birmingham City and Shrewsbury Town. He played as a midfielder.

Burton was born in Kings Heath, Birmingham. He joined Birmingham City as a YTS trainee in 1986, and turned professional the following year. He made his first-team debut as a substitute in the League Cup in September 1988, and his first appearance in the Second Division on 25 March 1989, coming on as substitute for Gary Childs in a 2–0 defeat away to Leicester City. He made two more appearances from the bench in the 1988–89 season, but that was the end of his first-team career at Birmingham. He joined Sheffield Wednesday briefly in 1991, but without playing for their first team, and then spent a year with Shrewsbury Town before dropping into non-league football.
