= Mark Taylor (footballer, born 1964) =

English footballer

Personal information
- Full name: Peter Mark Richard Taylor
- Date of birth: 20 November 1964 (age 61)
- Place of birth: Hartlepool, England
- Height: 5 ft 7 in (1.70 m)
- Position: Winger

Senior career*
| Years | Team | Apps | (Gls) |
| 1984–1986 | Hartlepool United | 47 | (4) |
| 1985–1986 | → Crewe Alexandra (loan) | 3 | (0) |
| 1986–1992 | Blackpool | 121 | (43) |
| 1992 | → Cardiff City (loan) | 6 | (3) |
| 1992–1995 | Wrexham | 61 | (9) |
| Total | | 238 | (59) |
- * Club domestic league appearances and goals

Peter Mark Richard Taylor (born 20 November 1964) is an English former professional footballer. He played as a winger.

== Playing career ==
Taylor began his career with his hometown club, Hartlepool United, in 1984. Over two years, he made 47 league appearances for Pools and scored four goals.

After a loan spell at Crewe Alexandra in 1985–86, Taylor signed for Sam Ellis's Blackpool in 1986. He made his debut at Doncaster Rovers on 14 September 1986 in the fourth league game of the 1986–87 season. Over the course of the season, Taylor made 40 league appearances and scored fourteen goals in a strike partnership with Paul Stewart.

In his second season at Blackpool, 1987–88, Taylor made 41 league appearances and scored 21 goals, finishing as the club's top scorer in the wake of Stewart's departure to Manchester City at the end of the previous season.

Taylor suffered an injury in December of the 1988–89 season that put him out of action for the rest of that campaign and the whole of the next.

He started the 1990–91 season on the bench, but he returned to the starting line-up on 10 November 1990, in a 4–2 victory over Aldershot at Bloomfield Road. Taylor scored the Seasiders' second goal. His season stopped again shortly thereafter, however, when he missed seven games (the first two under new manager Billy Ayre, who succeeded Graham Carr). He returned in mid-January 1991 and helped the team to a fifth-placed finish in Division Four and qualification for the play-offs. Taylor played in both legs of the semi-final against Scunthorpe United, as well as in the final against Torquay United. It wasn't to be for Blackpool, as the Gulls were victorious in the deciding penalty shoot-out.

In 1991–92, Taylor made only two starts (scoring a goal in each) in Billy Ayre's first full season in charge, before being loaned out to Cardiff City in the New Year. At Ninian Park, Taylor scored three goals in six appearances. In his absence, Blackpool made the play-offs once more, and this time won promotion after another penalty shoot-out.

At the end of the 1991–92 season, Taylor was sold to another Welsh club, Wrexham, where he finished his career.

== Physio career ==
=== Blackpool ===
Taylor was appointed Physiotherapist at Bloomfield Road in the summer of 1995 where he was to develop a strong relationship with Sam Allardyce and later Gary Megson. Highlights include reaching the playoffs in 1995/96.

=== Blackburn Rovers ===
Taylor joined the defending Premier League champions to work alongside England Physiotherapist Alan Smith and it was at this time he first worked with Roy Hodgson, proving influential due to Hodgson's previous exposure to sports science in Italy. During his time at Ewood Park, Taylor also worked under Brian Kidd and Graeme Souness and experienced 2 European campaigns.

=== Bolton Wanderers ===
Bolton's return to the top flight coincided with Sam Allardyce re-joining forces with Taylor and appointing him as Head of Sports Science and Medicine. They believed innovation in sport could offer a performance advantage and they set about investing in one of the most respected sports science and medical teams in the Premier League. Highlights included 4 consecutive top 10 finishes, 2 UEFA Cup campaigns and a League Cup final appearance.

It was during Bolton's most successful period in modern history that Taylor became instrumental in player recruitment with players such as Fernando Hierro, Ivan Campo and Youri Djorkaeff based at the Euxton Lane training ground.

=== Newcastle United ===
After Allardyce became manager of The Magpies, Taylor was appointed Head of Sports Medicine and Science on Tyneside.

=== Fulham ===
Being reunited with Roy Hodgson once more as Head of Sports Medicine and Exercise Science, Taylor oversaw Fulham's most successful period in modern history building a department that achieved unrivalled results in injury prevention. Fulham peaked reaching the 2010 UEFA Europa League Final.

Promoted to board director in 2012 and becoming Performance Director, Taylor worked closely alongside Mark Hughes who believed "this club is at the cutting edge of the modern game. Mark Taylor is Head of Sports Medicine and Exercise Science and he's the most qualified of his type. Mark and his team can give you the extra one or two per cent that can make a difference on a Saturday afternoon".

=== Sunderland ===
On 22 October 2015 Taylor was once again re-united with Sam Allardyce where he was appointed in the role of Performance Director for Sunderland. Having achieved the objective of avoiding relegation with Sunderland AFC and Sam Allardyce being appointed the new English manager, Taylor was linked with a move to the national team, but Allardyce's reign as managers was cut short.

== Bibliography ==
- Mark Taylor at Soccerbase
- Calley, Roy (1992). Blackpool: A Complete Record 1887-1992. Breedon Books Sport. ISBN 1-873626-07-X.
