= Carl Richards =

Jamaican footballer (born 1960)

Personal information
- Full name: Carroll Lloyd Richards
- Date of birth: 12 January 1960 (age 66)
- Place of birth: Port Maria, Jamaica
- Height: 6 ft 0 in (1.83 m)
- Position: Forward

Senior career*
Years	Team	Apps	(Gls)
- Dulwich Hamlet
19??–1986	Enfield		
1986–1988	Bournemouth	71	(16)
1988–1989	Birmingham City	19	(2)
1989–1990	Peterborough United	20	(5)
1990–1992	Blackpool	41	(8)
1991	→ Maidstone United (loan)	4	(2)
- Enfield
- Bromley
- * Club domestic league appearances and goals

Carroll Lloyd Richards (born 12 January 1960), known as Carl Richards, is a former professional footballer. He played for five Football League clubs in a six-year professional career during the 1980s and 1990s, making over 150 League appearances. He played as a forward.

== Career ==
Richards played non-league football for Dulwich Hamlet and Enfield before signing for AFC Bournemouth in 1986. He made 71 league appearances for the "Cherries" in two years with the club, scoring 16 goals. In 1988, he signed for Birmingham City. In one season at St Andrew's, he made 19 league appearances and scored twice. Peterborough United signed Richards in 1989, and in one season with the club he made 20 league appearances and scored 5 goals.

In 1990, he joined Jimmy Mullen's Blackpool. He made his debut for the club on 3 February, in a 3–1 victory over Mansfield Town at Bloomfield Road. He scored the hosts' third goal. He went on to make a further fifteen league appearances in the 1989–90 campaign, scoring three more goals in the process (including the only goal of the game in a victory over Leyton Orient on 20 March. At the season's end, however, Blackpool were relegated to Division Four, and Jimmy Mullen was sacked.

Mullen was replaced by Graham Carr for the start of the 1990–91 season. Richards did not start in any of Carr's seventeen league games in charge, but he did appear in one League Cup and one FA Cup tie under Carr. Carr was sacked at the end of November, and his replacement, Billy Ayre, eventually gave Richards a starting place alongside Dave Bamber. Richards made 22 league appearances in 1990–91 and scored 4 goals. In 1991–92, Richards made just three league appearances as Blackpool won promotion back to the third tier of English football via the end-of-season play-offs.

Richards left Blackpool to return to non-league football with Enfield, from where he moved on to Bromley.

== Honours ==
Bournemouth

- Football League Third Division: 1986–87
