= Phil Horner =

English footballer (born 1966)

Personal information
- Full name: Philip Matthew Horner
- Date of birth: 10 November 1966 (age 59)
- Place of birth: Leeds, England
- Height: 6 ft 1 in (1.85 m)
- Position: Defender

Team information
- Current team: Blackpool (physio)

Senior career*
Years	Team	Apps	(Gls)
1983–1988	Leicester City	10	(0)
1985–1986	→ Rotherham United (loan)	4	(0)
1988–1990	Halifax Town	72	(4)
1990–1996	Blackpool	187	(22)
1995–1996	→ Southport (loan)	?	(?)
1996–1999	Southport	?	(?)
1999–2000	Lancaster City	?	(?)
Total		273	(26)
- * Club domestic league appearances and goals

Philip Matthew Horner (born 10 November 1966) is an English former professional footballer. He is now a qualified physiotherapist and works at his former playing club Blackpool.

== Career ==
Horner was born in Leeds, West Yorkshire. He began his career with Leicester City in 1983, but he only made ten league appearances in five years at Filbert Street and spent a short spell on loan at Rotherham United in the 1985–86 season.

In 1988, he joined Halifax Town, then managed by Billy Ayre. Horner followed Ayre to Blackpool when the latter became manager of the Tangerines in 1990. In six years at Bloomfield Road he made 187 league appearances, scoring 22 goals.

He joined non-League Southport on loan in the 1995–96 season. After finishing his professional playing career at Bloomfield Road, Horner returned to Southport on a permanent basis while he studied for a Bachelor of Science degree in physiotherapy. He finished his playing career with Lancaster City in the 1999–2000 season in the Northern Premier League Premier Division.

== Post-football career ==
After gaining his degree in Physiotherapy from the University of Salford, Horner worked as a physiotherapist at Royal Preston Hospital before returning to Bloomfield Road to become Blackpool's club physiotherapist in November 2000, a role he continues to fulfill. Horner is a member of both the Chartered Society of Physiotherapy and the Council of Professional Supplementary Medicine.

== Honours ==
Blackpool

- Football League Fourth Division play-offs: 1992

Southport

- FA Trophy runner-up: 1997–98
