= Crookhill =

- Area
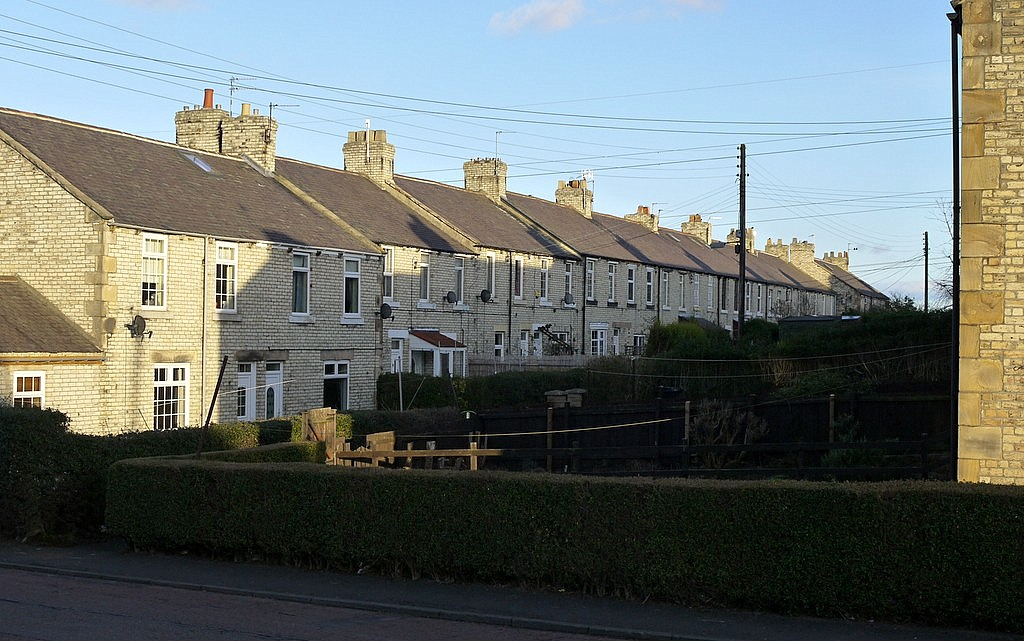
- Simpson Street

- Location in Tyne and Wear
- Coordinates: 54.968°N 1.755°W
- OS grid reference: NZ157636
- Sovereign state: United Kingdom
- Country: England
- District: Tyne and Wear

Crookhill is an area of Ryton in Tyne and Wear, England. The original terraced housing was built mostly as accommodation for NCB workers, and lies to the east of the centre of Ryton, approx 6 miles west of Newcastle upon Tyne.

== Notable people ==
- Billy Ayre, former professional football player and manager
