= Gary Brook =

Gary Brook may refer to:

- Gary Brook (footballer) (born 1964), English footballer
- Gary Brook (cricketer) (born 1968), English cricketer

== See also ==
- Garry Brooke (1960–2025), English footballer
- Gary Brooks (born 1983), Jamaican footballer
- Gary Brooker (1945–2022), British singer and pianist with Procul Harum
- Gary Brooks Faulkner (born 1958), American vigilante arrested in Pakistan in 2010
