= Adrian Bird (footballer) =

English footballer

Personal information
- Full name: Adrian Lee Bird
- Date of birth: 8 July 1969 (age 57)
- Place of birth: Bristol, England
- Height: 6 ft 1 in (1.85 m)
- Position: Centre half

Youth career
- 1985–1986: Birmingham City

Senior career*
Years	Team	Apps	(Gls)
1986–1990	Birmingham City	27	(0)
1990–1991	Moor Green		
- * Club domestic league appearances and goals

Adrian Lee Bird (born 8 July 1969) is an English former professional footballer who played 27 games in the Football League for Birmingham City. He played as a centre half.

Bird was born in Bristol. When he left school in 1985 he joined Birmingham City as an apprentice, turning professional two years later. He made his debut for the club as a 17-year-old apprentice, on 29 December 1986 in a 1–1 draw at home to Millwall in the Second Division. By the 1988–89 season Bird was beginning to establish himself as a first-team player when he suffered a knee injury which effectively ended his career. He spent a year at the Football Injuries Treatment Centre at Lilleshall, and attempted a comeback with Moor Green, but was forced to retire from the game in 1991 at the age of only 21.
