= Russell Coughlin =

Welsh footballer

Personal information
- Full name: Russell James Coughlin
- Date of birth: 15 February 1960
- Place of birth: Swansea, Wales
- Date of death: 3 August 2016 (aged 56)
- Place of death: Carlisle, England
- Height: 5 ft 8 in (1.73 m)
- Position: Midfielder

Senior career*
Years	Team	Apps	(Gls)
1977–1978	Manchester City	0	(0)
1978–1980	Blackburn Rovers	24	(0)
1980–1984	Carlisle United	130	(13)
1984–1987	Plymouth Argyle	131	(18)
1987–1990	Blackpool	101	(8)
1990	→ Shrewsbury Town (loan)	5	(0)
1990–1993	Swansea City	101	(2)
1993–1995	Exeter City	68	(0)
1995–1996	Torquay United	25	(0)
1996–1997	Dorchester Town		
Total		585	(41)
- * Club domestic league appearances and goals

Russell James Coughlin (15 February 1960 – 3 August 2016) was a Welsh professional footballer who played as a midfielder.

Coughlin began his professional career with Manchester City in 1977, but after failing to break into the first team at Maine Road, he joined Blackburn Rovers the following year. At Ewood Park, he made 24 league appearances in two years.

In 1980, Coughlin moved north to join Carlisle United. He went on to make 130 league appearances for the Cumbrians, scoring thirteen goals.

Four years later, in 1984, Coughlin moved to England's south coast to sign for Plymouth Argyle. There, he broke the 130-league-game mark again, scoring eighteen goals in the process.

In 1987, he returned to the north-west to join Sam Ellis's Blackpool. He made his debut for the Seasiders on 12 December, in a 1–1 draw at Chesterfield in the league. He scored his first goal for the club three games later, in another 1–1 draw, this time at Notts County. He went on to make 24 appearances and score two goals in total during the 1987–88 league campaign.

The following season, 1988–89, Coughlin spent the majority of his games as strike partner to new signing Andy Garner. In 42 league appearances, he scored five goals, three of which were from the penalty spot. He also scored in Blackpool's League Cup campaign, in a 2–0 second round, first leg victory over Sheffield Wednesday at Bloomfield Road on 27 September 1988.

In 1989–90, under new manager Jimmy Mullen, Coughlin returned to his favoured midfield role. He made 34 league appearances and scored one goal as Blackpool finished second-bottom and were relegated to Division Four. Coughlin left the seaside early the following season after a loan spell at Shrewsbury Town.

Coughlin joined his hometown club, Swansea City, for the 1990–91 season, and went on to make 101 league appearances for the Welshmen, before leaving for Exeter City in 1993, in part-exchange for John Hodge.

After a two-year spell with Exeter, Coughlin brought his career to a close with Torquay United in 1996. He made almost 600 appearances and scored 41 goals in his 19-year Football League career.

In August 2016, Coughlin died after suffering a medical event while behind the wheel of his car in Carlisle. A wreath was laid for him at Bloomfield Road before the opening 2016–17 Football League Two fixture between Blackpool and Exeter City, both of whom he had played for in his career.
