= Steven Clark (English footballer) =

English footballer (born 1982)

Personal information
- Date of birth: 2 February 1982 (age 44)
- Place of birth: London, England
- Position: Midfielder

Youth career
- West Ham United

Senior career*
Years	Team	Apps	(Gls)
2001–2002	West Ham United	0	(0)
2002–2004	Southend United	50	(1)
2004	Macclesfield Town (loan)	4	(0)
2004	Hornchurch		
2004–2005	Dagenham & Redbridge	12	(1)
2005–2006	Fisher Athletic		
- Weymouth
- Wingate & Finchley

Managerial career
- 2019: Wingate & Finchley
- 2021–2025: Sporting Bengal United
- 2025-2026: May & Baker
- * Club domestic league appearances and goals as of 18:46, 15 May 2007 (UTC)

Steven Clark (born 2 February 1982) is a football manager who played as a midfielder. He was last manager of May & Baker.

== Club career ==
Clark started as a trainee with West Ham United before moving to Southend United in 2002 for £50,000. After a season at the club he signed on for another year in June 2003. He was released in May 2004.

He had several clubs over a short period of time starting with the demise of what was Hornchurch. After Hornchurch folded, he moved to Dagenham & Redbridge then to Weymouth with various loan spells along the way. Clark then played for Fisher Athletic.

== Managerial career ==
Following his retirement, Clark joined Sporting Bengal United as a coach under Anwar Uddin. In May 2019, Clark returned to former club Wingate & Finchley as manager, before leaving in September 2019 after three wins from ten games. On 24 December 2021, Clark returned to Sporting Bengal as manager, succeeding Shipon Miah. He left the club in 2025 and was later appointed manager of May & Baker.
