= Tony Cunningham (footballer) =

Jamaican footballer (born 1957)

Personal information
- Full name: Anthony Eugene Cunningham
- Date of birth: 12 November 1957 (age 68)
- Place of birth: Kingston, Jamaica
- Height: 6 ft 2 in (1.88 m)
- Position: Striker

Senior career*
Years	Team	Apps	(Gls)
	Kidderminster Harriers	?	(?)
197?–1979	Stourbridge	?	(?)
1979–1982	Lincoln City	123	(32)
1982–1984	Barnsley	42	(11)
1984	Sheffield Wednesday	28	(5)
1984–1985	Manchester City	18	(1)
1985–1987	Newcastle United	47	(4)
1987–1989	Blackpool	71	(17)
1989–1991	Bury	58	(17)
1991	Bolton Wanderers	9	(4)
1991–1993	Rotherham United	69	(24)
1993	Doncaster Rovers	25	(1)
1993–1994	Wycombe Wanderers	5	(0)
–	Gainsborough Trinity	?	(?)
Total		495	(116)
- * Club domestic league appearances and goals as of 25 June 2007

Anthony Eugene Cunningham (born 12 November 1957) is a Jamaican former professional footballer.

Cunningham, a striker, began his professional career with Lincoln City in 1979. In three years with the Imps, he made 123 league appearances and scored 32 goals.

Barnsley came in for his services in 1982, and he went on to make 42 appearances for the South Yorkshire club, scoring eleven goals.

After leaving Oakwell, Cunningham remained in the White Rose county, making 28 appearances and scoring five goals for Sheffield Wednesday.

In 1984 Cunningham had a short spell with Manchester City before moving to the North East to join Jack Charlton's Newcastle United. He spent two years on Tyneside, making just short of 50 appearances for the Magpies, scoring four goals. He was commonly known to his friends while at Newcastle as 'Slug'.

Cunningham traded the North East for the North West in July 1987 when he signed for Sam Ellis' Blackpool for a tribunal-set fee of £25,000. He made his debut for the Seasiders in the opening day of the 1987–88 season, a draw at Gillingham.

What started as a promising Blackpool career became a disappointing one. As the team struggled, Cunningham was made a scapegoat, and at the end of the 1988–89, he rejoined Ellis, who had become manager of Bury.

On his return to Bloomfield Road with the Shakers, on 31 October 1989, Cunningham was sent off in the first half. The visitors, however, won the game by a single goal.

After Bury, Cunningham played for Bolton Wanderers, Rotherham United, Doncaster Rovers and Wycombe Wanderers. After almost 500 league games and over one hundred goals, he ended his career with non-league Gainsborough Trinity.

== Post-retirement ==
Cunningham now lives and works in Lincoln as a solicitor.
