= Mark Gayle =

English footballer

Personal information
- Full name: Mark Samuel Roye Gayle
- Date of birth: 21 October 1969 (age 57)
- Place of birth: Bromsgrove, England
- Height: 6 ft 0 in (1.83 m)
- Position: Goalkeeper

Youth career
- 1988–1989: Leicester City

Senior career*
Years	Team	Apps	(Gls)
1989–1990	Blackpool	1	(0)
1990–1991	Worcester City		
1991–1993	Walsall	75	(0)
1993–1998	Crewe Alexandra	83	(0)
1994	→ Liverpool (loan)	0	(0)
1997	→ Birmingham City (loan)	0	(0)
1997	→ Hereford United (loan)	5	(0)
1997	→ Chesterfield (loan)	5	(0)
1998	→ Luton Town (loan)	0	(0)
1998–1999	Rushden & Diamonds	10	(0)
1999–2000	Chesterfield	30	(0)
2000–2002	Hednesford Town	92	(0)
2002–2003	Solihull Borough		(0)
2003	Hereford United	0	(0)
2003	Halesowen Town	7	(0)
2003–2005	Solihull Borough	38	(0)
2005–2006	Tamworth	3	(0)
2006–2007	Halesowen Town	6	(0)
2007	Rushall Olympic	1	(0)
- * Club domestic league appearances and goals

Mark Samuel Roye Gayle (born 21 October 1969) is a former professional footballer who made 193 appearances as a goalkeeper in the English Football League. After his playing career finished, he coached at clubs including Leamington.
