= Colin Robinson (footballer) =

English footballer (born 1960)

Personal information
- Full name: Colin Roy Robinson
- Date of birth: 15 May 1960
- Place of birth: Birmingham, England
- Height: 5 ft 10 in (1.78 m)
- Position: Forward

Youth career
- Mile Oak Rovers

Senior career*
Years	Team	Apps	(Gls)
1982–1988	Shrewsbury Town	194	(41)
1988–1989	Birmingham City	37	(6)
1989–1991	Hereford United	64	(6)
1991–1992	Worcester City	?	(16)
- Bridgnorth Town
- Halesowen Town
- Shifnal Town
- * Club domestic league appearances and goals

Colin Roy Robinson (born 15 May 1960) is an English former professional footballer who played as a forward.

Born in Birmingham, Robinson began his football career with local club Mile Oak Rovers before turning professional with Shrewsbury Town in 1982. He was a regular goalscorer with the club before joining Birmingham City in January 1988. Though an injury sustained in his second game caused him to miss the rest of the season, he played regularly in the 1988–89 season, but his goals were insufficient to prevent the club's relegation to the Third Division. Two relatively unproductive seasons with Hereford United, the highlight being scoring the opening goal in Hereford's 2–1 victory over Wrexham in the 1990 Welsh Cup final at Cardiff Arms Park, preceded his moving into non-league football with clubs including Worcester City, Bridgnorth Town, Halesowen Town and Shifnal Town.
