= Roy Calley =

English journalist

Roy Calley is an English journalist. He works for the BBC in Salford but was brought up in Blackpool, Lancashire, but now lives full-time in Nice, France.

He joined the BBC in 1990 at Radio Lancashire, working as a sports journalist. Three years later he joined BBC GMR in Manchester and was the morning sports reporter on the breakfast programme, as well as presenting his own sports preview show every Friday night.

He then moved to BBC Radio Leeds, where, despite being a Lancastrian, he reported on the fortunes of Yorkshire County Cricket Club for the local stations. That was followed by a move to London, where he joined the sports department at Broadcasting House, combining reporting duties for BBC Radio stations, 1, 2, 4 and 5 Live. This included attending numerous events such as the World Athletics Championships and the Commonwealth Games.

Calley then moved to a producer-based role and was involved heavily in the coverage of football, motor sport, rugby league and numerous programmes on the network, travelling across the world. He joined BBC News 24 as a TV editor in 2002, combining producing and reporting. He was responsible for producing Formula One on the News Channel and started the Inside F1 show. He now works for BBC World and has had a combined biography of James Hunt and Niki Lauda called 'The Playboy and the Rat (ISBN 1780910533) released. He has also had a history of the World Water Speed Record called The Fast and the Forgotten published in September 2014

== Publications ==
In late 1990, Calley published the first edition of the short-lived fanzine of Blackpool F.C., View from the Tower. He has been a supporter of his hometown club since the 1960s.

In 1992, he published Blackpool: A Complete Record 1887–1992, the first statistical history of the club. A copy of the book is available at Harvard University Library, Trinity College, Dublin, and the University of Oxford, amongst other libraries.

In 2007, his first novel was published, entitled Days Like These (ISBN 1434303888).

In 2011, he published an updated version of Blackpool: The Complete Record (ISBN 978-1-85983-976-8), which took the Blackpool story to 22 May 2011, the day the club were relegated from the Premier League. The book's two forewords are written by former Blackpool captain Jimmy Armfield and BBC Radio sport commentator David Oates.

In 2014, he wrote The Fast and the Forgotten, a history of the World Water Speed Record (ISBN 1445637863)

In 2016, Calley left the BBC after moving full-time to Nice, France. He was present on the night of the 14 July terror attack, and reported through the night on the events.

In November 2017, his new book, On the trail of Mary, Queen of Scots, will be released by Amberley Publishing.
