= Mark Graham (footballer, born 1974) =

Northern Irish footballer

Personal information
- Date of birth: 24 October 1974 (age 52)
- Place of birth: Newry, Northern Ireland
- Height: 5 ft 7 in (1.70 m)
- Position: Midfielder

Senior career*
Years	Team	Apps	(Gls)
1995–1999	Queens Park Rangers	20	(0)
1999	Cambridge United	1	(0)
2000	Stevenage Borough	10	(1)
2000–2002	Aldershot Town	58	(2)
2002–2003	Billericay Town		
2003	Canvey Island		
2003–2006	St Albans City		
- * Club domestic league appearances and goals

Mark Graham (born 24 October 1974) is a Northern Irish footballer who played in The Football League for Cambridge United and Queens Park Rangers.
