= Ian Gore =

English footballer

Personal information
- Full name: Ian George Gore
- Date of birth: 10 January 1968 (age 58)
- Place of birth: Whiston, Lancashire, England
- Height: 5 ft 11 in (1.80 m)
- Position: Defender

Youth career
- 19??–1986: Blackpool

Senior career*
Years	Team	Apps	(Gls)
1986–1987	Birmingham City	0	(0)
1987–1988	Southport		
1988–1995	Blackpool	200	(0)
1995–1996	Torquay United	25	(2)
1996–1998	Doncaster Rovers	66	(1)
1998	Marine Castle		
1998–1999	Boreham Wood		
1999–2002	Gainsborough Trinity		
- * Club domestic league appearances and goals

Ian George Gore (born 10 January 1968) is an English former professional footballer. He played as a centre-back.

== Football career ==
Gore began his career as an apprentice with Birmingham City, turning professional in May 1986, but was released without playing a first-team game. He joined non-league Southport before joining Blackpool on a free transfer in January 1988, beginning a seven-year spell at Bloomfield Road in which he played exactly 200 league games. He was voted the Blackpool supporters' Player of the Year for 1990–91, and the following year he was a member of the Blackpool side that won promotion, via the Division Four play-off final at Wembley, to the new Division Two in 1991–92.

In August 1995, Gore joined Torquay United on a free transfer, having played against the Gulls at Wembley for Blackpool in the 1991 play-off final, which Torquay won on penalties. Although a regular in the side he moved to Doncaster Rovers in March 1996. He played 66 times for Rovers, mostly alongside Darren Moore, who he had replaced at Torquay. Gore scored once before being released.

Gore played the summer of 1998 in Singapore with Marine Castle before returning to England with non-league side Boreham Wood. He then moved on to Gainsborough Trinity in September 1999. He retired in 2002.

== Honours ==
Blackpool

- Football League Fourth Division play-offs: 1992

Individual

- Blackpool Supporters' Player of the Year: 1990–91
