= Matthew Fox (author) =

Canadian author and magazine editor

Matthew Fox is a Canadian fiction writer, editor, and literary critic. He's the author of the novel This Is It and the short story collection Cities of Weather.

== Early life ==
Fox studied creative writing at both Concordia University in Montreal and The New School in New York City.

== Writing ==
In 2005, Fox authored Cities of Weather, a collection of short stories. Quill & Quire magazine, in a review by Robert Wiersema, described the book as "a promising foray into the short fiction arena" and details how the short stories are "set largely in urban landscapes and populated with characters in transition or crisis. The stories deal, in the main, with the psychological spaces between gay and straight, youth and adult, single and committed, life and death.

Reviewing Cities of Weather in the Montreal Review of Books, Andrea Belcham observed that "Fox has a knack for bringing his readers into his cerebral worlds and for sustaining their interest with his spot-on observations."

His second fiction book, the novel-in-stories This Is It, was released in 2024. It was chosen by the CBC as one of the fiction books to read in fall of 2024. The novel is a multigenerational family drama told in a series of stories linked by an overarching narrative about the narrator, Giovanni, and his partner, BF. Shawn Syms, reviewing the work in Quill & Quire, stated that This Is It "balances thematic and formal complexity with bold characterization and vivid descriptions to create a work of significant emotional resonance." Jonathan Dee observed that "Fox has written a family saga that’s as formally inventive as it is funny and tender."

Carley Fortune offered advance praise for the book, stating that "Matthew Fox’s This Is It—about the stories and secrets that bind families and lovers—is nothing less than a modern masterpiece. Gut-wrenching, sharply observed, and deeply funny, the novel excavates generations of Zappacosta family lore to take the reader on an emotional journey unlike any other."

When interviewed by Books in Canada magazine, Fox described his literary influences as Lorrie Moore, Alice Munro, Leonard Cohen, Mavis Gallant, Guy de Maupassant, J. M. Coetzee and Anton Chekhov.

Fox's work has also appeared in magazines such as Grain, The New Quarterly, Big Fiction, Toronto Life, and Maisonneuve. His short fiction has been anthologized in A Room at the Heart of Things edited by Elisabeth Harvor, Fresh Men 2: New Voices in Gay Fiction edited by Donald Weise, and Here & Now: An Anthology of Queer Italian-Canadian Writing edited by Licia Canton.

== Editorial career ==
From 2003 to 2006, Fox worked at Maisonneuve magazine in Montreal as a fiction and associate editor. He subsequently moved to Toronto and joined the staff of Toronto Life magazine as online editor. With the exception of a short sabbatical, he remained with the publication for eight years.

Under his leadership, the magazine dramatically expanded its online reach. In October 2009, Torontolife.com was awarded "Best overall magazine website" at the inaugural Canadian Online Publishing Awards. The same month, Toronto Life announced that under Fox's direction, online readership had grown by 90,000 unique visitors to a monthly average of more than 300,000 readers.

Fox now lives in Berlin, Germany.
