= 1992–93 Blackpool F.C. season =

English football club season

Blackpool F.C.
1992–93 season
- Owner and chairman: Owen Oyston
- Manager: Billy Ayre
- Division Two: 18th
- FA Cup: First round
- League Cup: Second round
- Top goalscorer: David Eyres (16)

The 1992–93 season was Blackpool F.C.'s 85th season (82nd consecutive) in the Football League. They competed in the 24-team Division Two, then the third tier of English league football (after the formation of the new Premier League), finishing eighteenth. It was Billy Ayre's second full season as manager.

David Eyres was the club's top league goalscorer, with sixteen goals.

Hartlepool United set a new English football record of thirteen consecutive games without scoring a goal. The streak ended when they visited Bloomfield Road for a league match on 6 March.

== Table ==
Pos	Team	Pld	W	D	L	GF	GA	GD	Pts
16	Hartlepool United	46	14	12	20	42	60	−18	54
17	Bournemouth	46	12	17	17	45	52	−7	53
18	Blackpool	46	12	15	19	63	75	−12	51
19	Exeter City	46	11	17	18	54	69	−15	50
20	Hull City	46	13	11	22	46	69	−23	50

Rules for classification: 1) Points; 2) Goals scored; 3) Goal difference
