= Craig Madden =

English footballer and manager (born 1958)

Personal information
- Full name: Craig Anthony Madden
- Date of birth: 25 September 1958 (age 68)
- Place of birth: Manchester, England
- Height: 5 ft 8 in (1.73 m)
- Position: Striker

Youth career
- 19??–1977: Northern Nomads

Senior career*
Years	Team	Apps	(Gls)
1977–1986	Bury	297	(129)
1986–1987	West Brom	12	(3)
1987–1990	Blackpool	91	(24)
1990	→ Wrexham (loan)	8	(0)
1990	York City	4	(0)
1990–1992	Fleetwood Town		
Total		412	(156)

Managerial career
- 2001: Stockport County (caretaker)
- * Club domestic league appearances and goals

Craig Anthony Madden (born 25 September 1958) is an English former professional footballer who played as a striker and made more than 400 appearances in the Football League.

== Playing career ==
After playing for Northern Nomads, Madden began his professional career at Bury in 1977. He spent nine years at Gigg Lane, making almost 300 league appearances and scoring 129 goals. He still holds the record for the most goals (42) in a season (1981-82) and remains the clubs' all-time record goalscorer.

A short spell at West Brom followed, before he joined Blackpool, then under the guidance of Sam Ellis, in February 1987. At Bloomfield Road he began to fall prey to niggling injuries, and each time he dropped out of the team it became more difficult for him to break back in. On 11 November 1989, he opened the scoring in Blackpool's home League game against Brentford after just eighteen seconds, which was only seven seconds outside Bill Slater's all-time record for the club. Midway through that disastrous 1989-90 season for Blackpool, Jimmy Mullen allowed him to move to non-league Fleetwood Town, where he found his scoring touch again and continued to enjoy the game.

Madden maintained his connection with Blackpool, becoming the community officer at Bloomfield Road in April 1991. "I am delighted to have landed the job here at Bloomfield Road," he said at the time. "I am looking forward to getting out and about and meeting people from different groups of the community. My immediate aims are to settle in and carry on with the same activities as before — but hopefully there will be some new ideas too, including two new summer schools for the children's holidays in the summer." He was succeeded in the position by his former Bury and Blackpool teammate Derek Spence.

== Management ==
In 2001, Madden became caretaker manager of Stockport County after the dismissal of Andy Kilner. He is still at the club coaching Stockport's youth team having also helped with the first team in the past.

In June 2010 Madden was appointed assistant manager at newly promoted Fleetwood Town, alongside Micky Mellon.

Following Micky Mellon's departure in December 2012 he became youth team manager.
