= Mark Bradshaw (footballer) =

English footballer and manager

Personal information
- Date of birth: 7 September 1969 (age 57)
- Place of birth: Ashton-under-Lyne, England
- Position: Left-back

Youth career
- 1985–1986: Blackpool

Senior career*
| Years | Team | Apps | (Gls) |
| 1986–1990 | Blackpool | 42 | (1) |
| 1990 | → York City (loan) | 1 | (0) |
| 1990–1994 | Stafford Rangers | 160 | (7) |
| 1994–1997 | Macclesfield Town | 66 | (4) |
| 1997–2001 | Halifax Town | 125 | (12) |
- Droylsden
- Mossley
- Woodley
- Curzon Ashton

International career
| 1998 | England Semi-Pro | 1 | (1) |

Managerial career
- 2008–2010: Curzon Ashton Ladies
- 2025–2026: Curzon Ashton
- * Club domestic league appearances and goals

Mark Bradshaw (born 7 September 1969) is an English football coach and former player who played as a left-back.

== Coaching career ==
On 20 June 2025, Bradshaw was appointed head coach of National League North side Curzon Ashton having been involved with the club in various capacities over the previous twenty years.

On 18 March 2026, Bradshaw departed the club.
