= Matthew Fox (footballer) =

English footballer

Personal information
- Full name: Matthew Christopher Fox
- Date of birth: 13 July 1971 (age 55)
- Place of birth: Birmingham, England
- Height: 6 ft 0 in (1.83 m)
- Position: Centre back

Youth career
- 1987–1989: Birmingham City

Senior career*
Years	Team	Apps	(Gls)
1989–1993	Birmingham City	14	(0)
1991	→ Cheltenham Town (loan)		
1993	Northampton Town	1	(0)
1993–19??	Bridgnorth Town		
- * Club domestic league appearances and goals

Matthew Christopher Fox (born 13 July 1971) is an English former professional footballer who played in the Football League for Birmingham City and Northampton Town. He played as a centre back.

Fox was born in the Sheldon district of Birmingham. When he left school in 1987, he joined Birmingham City as a YTS trainee, and turned professional two years later. Fox, described as a "dogged defender, hard in the tackle and quick to cover", made his debut in the Second Division on 25 February 1989, deputising for Vince Overson in the starting eleven for a goalless draw away at West Bromwich Albion. He played twice more in the league that season, and then missed the entire 1989–90 season through injury. He played seven times in the league in 1990, then spent a month on loan at Cheltenham Town of the Conference, but was unable to establish himself in the first team on his return. He joined Division Two (third tier) club Northampton Town towards the end of the 1992–93 season, but played only once before being released. After an unsuccessful trial with Shrewsbury Town, he moved into non-league football with Bridgnorth Town.
