= Colin Methven =

Indian-born Scottish footballer

Personal information
- Full name: Colin John Methven
- Date of birth: 10 December 1955 (age 70)
- Place of birth: India
- Height: 6 ft 2 in (1.88 m)
- Position: Defender

Youth career
- –1974: Leven Royals

Senior career*
Years	Team	Apps	(Gls)
1974–1979	East Fife	154	(15)
1979–1986	Wigan Athletic	296	(21)
1986–1990	Blackpool	175	(11)
1990–1991	→ Carlisle United (loan)	12	(0)
1990–1993	Walsall	97	(3)
1993–1994	Barrow	7	(0)
Total		741	(50)
- * Club domestic league appearances and goals

Colin John Methven (born 10 December 1955) is a Scottish former professional footballer.

A centre-half, Methven began his career with East Fife in 1974, whilst also working as a mineworker. He went on to make 154 league appearances and score fifteen goals in five years, before joining Wigan Athletic in September 1979 for a fee of £30,000.

Methven remained at Springfield Park for seven years, making close to 300 appearances for the club and scoring 21 goals. He was part of the team that won the Freight Rover Trophy in 1985. He was the club's captain when Blackpool came in for his services in 1986 for £20,000.

He made his debut for the Seasiders on the opening day of the 1986–87 season in a goalless draw with Chesterfield at Bloomfield Road and became a virtual ever-present for the next four years.

Methven was a "footballing" centre-half who enjoyed going up for attacking corners, as evidenced by his 50 career league goals, and he was voted Player of the Year for two consecutive years by Blackpool's fans, who were angry when he was sold to Walsall in November 1990 after an earlier loan spell at Carlisle. In his early days of his short spell as Blackpool manager, Graham Carr declared that Methven was "neither fast enough nor good enough for Fourth Division football".

In the final game of the 1990–91 season, on 11 May 1991, Methven helped Walsall to a 2–0 win at Blackpool, denying the hosts automatic promotion to Division Three.

In 1998, Wigan Athletic fans voted Methven as the club's Best Football League Player of All-Time.

Methven finished his career with Barrow in 1994.

== Honours ==
Wigan Athletic

- Associate Members' Cup: 1984–85
