= Sébastien Schemmel =

French footballer (born 1975)

Personal information
- Date of birth: 2 June 1975 (age 51)
- Place of birth: Nancy, France
- Height: 1.78 m (5 ft 10 in)
- Position: Defender

Senior career*
Years	Team	Apps	(Gls)
1993–1998	Nancy	146	(1)
1998–2001	Metz	60	(2)
2001	→ West Ham United (loan)	12	(0)
2001–2003	West Ham United	51	(1)
2003–2004	Portsmouth	12	(0)
2004–2005	Le Havre	8	(0)
Total		289	(4)
- * Club domestic league appearances and goals

Sébastien Schemmel (born 2 June 1975) is a French former professional footballer who played as a defender, most notably for AS Nancy, Metz and West Ham United.

== Career ==
Schemmel was born in Nancy. He played for his hometown club of AS Nancy for 5 seasons, helping them to promotion to Ligue 1 in 1999. His performances earned him a transfer to fellow Ligue 1 club Metz. After a promising start to his Metz career Schemmel was dropped from the first team after an incident in December 2000 when he insulted two journalists, who later lodged a formal complaint with police. This culminated in Metz president Carlo Molinari had describing Schemmel as "phenomenally unstable."

Hearing of Schemmel being unsettled at Metz the West Ham manager Harry Redknapp approached the club to loan the player in January 2001, and he subsequently went on to make his Premier League debut on 22 January against Charlton Athletic. Schemmel had played against West Ham in the 1999 UEFA Intertoto Cup final, and then West Ham scout Glenn Roeder described Schemmel as outstanding. Schemmel impressed through the remainder of the season.

In the off-season, Harry Redknapp left West Ham and Glenn Roeder became the West Ham manager. One of Roeders first decisions was to make Schemmels transfer permanent for £765,000. In his first full season in the he won the "Hammer of the Year" award. Whilst at West Ham he played in their 1–0 victory over Manchester United at Old Trafford in the 2000–01 FA Cup, and scored once in the league against Derby County. The following season saw a downturn in form, perhaps caused by family problems. He left West Ham for Portsmouth in 2003. He scored once during his spell with Portsmouth, in a 2–1 win over Blackpool in the FA Cup.

After being released by Portsmouth in December 2004, he joined Le Havre AC for the rest of the season and played eight games.
