= Billy Ayre =

English footballer and manager

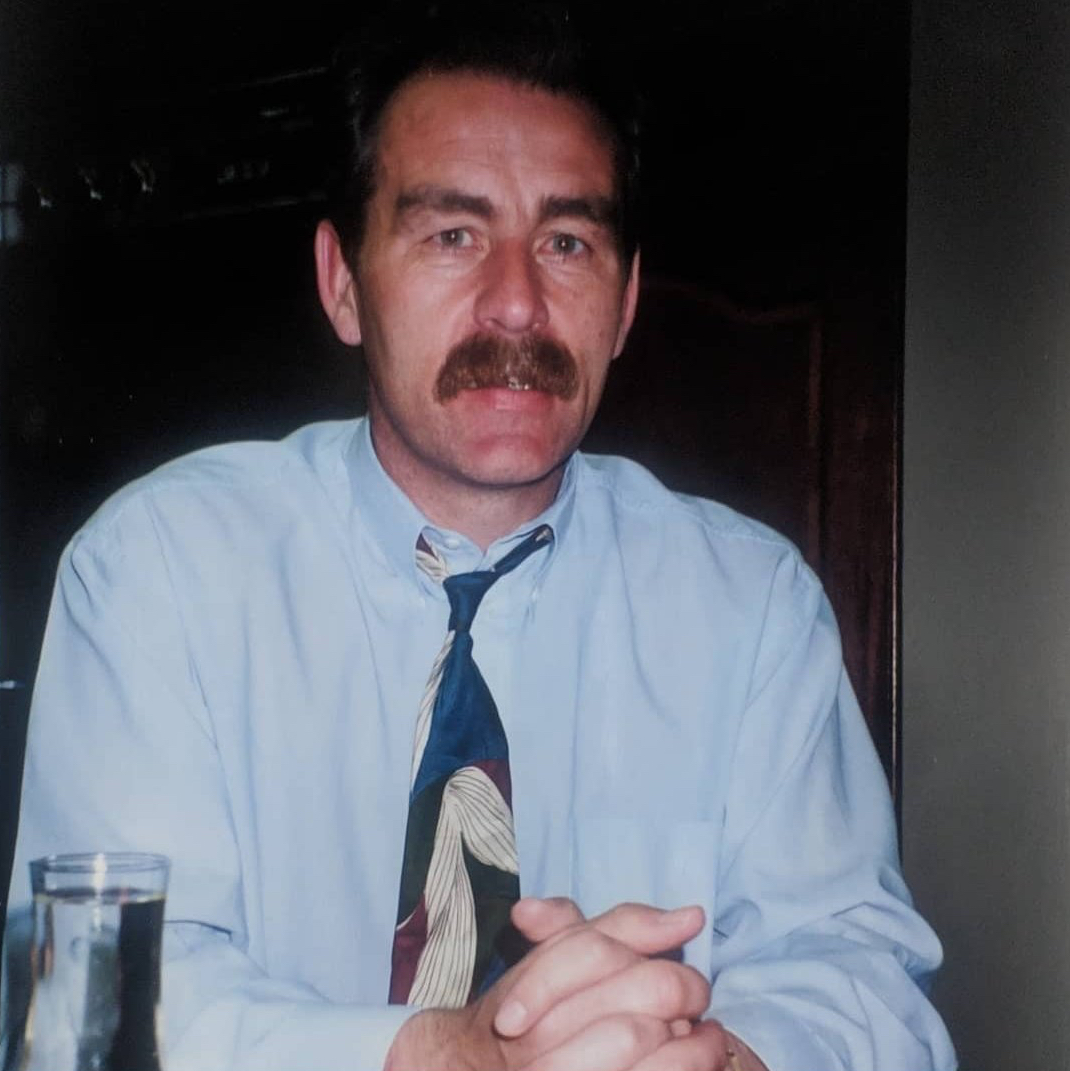
- Billy Ayre around 1990

Personal information
- Full name: William Ayre
- Date of birth: 7 May 1952
- Place of birth: Crookhill, England
- Date of death: 16 April 2002 (aged 49)
- Place of death: Ormskirk, England
- Height: 6 ft 0 in (1.83 m)
- Position: Centre back

Youth career
- Darlington

Senior career*
Years	Team	Apps	(Gls)
1971–1973	Crook Town	?	(?)
1974–1975	Bishop Auckland	?	(?)
1975–1977	Scarborough	?	(?)
1977–1981	Hartlepool United	141	(27)
1981–1982	Halifax Town	63	(5)
1982–1984	Mansfield Town	67	(7)
1984–1986	Halifax Town	32	(2)

Managerial career
- 1983–1984: Mansfield Town (caretaker)
- 1984: Halifax Town (caretaker)
- 1986–1990: Halifax Town
- 1990–1994: Blackpool
- 1994: Scarborough
- 1995–1996: Southport
- 2000: Cardiff City
- * Club domestic league appearances and goals

William Ayre (7 May 1952 – 16 April 2002) was an English footballer who played for three clubs in a sixteen-year professional career, making over three hundred League appearances in the process. After retiring from the playing side of the game, he became a manager, and took the helm at five clubs between 1984 and 2000. He guided Blackpool to two successive play-off finals, in 1991 and 1992 (winning promotion in the second appearance), during his four years in charge of the club.

== Playing career ==
Billy Ayre was born in the Gateshead suburb of Crookhill. After trying his hand at refereeing in his teenage years, he played for several years in non-League football at two amateur clubs in County Durham: Crook Town and Bishop Auckland.

=== Scarborough ===
Ayre began his professional playing career at Scarborough in 1975 whilst balancing a teaching profession at St Leonard's Catholic School in Durham, where he taught art and physical education. He won the Scarborough Supporters' Player of the Year award in 1977. It was his uncompromising performances for Boro that earned him a move, also in 1977, to Hartlepool United.

=== Hartlepool United ===
Ayre played over one hundred league games for Hartlepool, scoring 27 goals. He made his debut for the club on 13 August 1977, in a 3–0 League Cup defeat at Grimsby Town. He made his league debut seven days later in a 2–1 home defeat to Torquay United. He was the club's top scorer in an ever-present season with the club, 1977–78, with thirteen goals, which assisted in his being named as the Supporters' Player of the Year. In 2008, Ayre was posthumously named United's "Player of the 1970s".

In Ayre's second season at Hartlepool, 1978–79, he made 42 league appearances and scored five goals. In 1979–80, he made 43 league appearances and score nine goals. In his final season at the club, 1980–81, he made ten league appearances and scored one goal before he was sold to Halifax Town. He played against Hartlepool in Halifax's visit to Victoria Park later in the season.

=== Halifax Town ===
At Halifax, Ayre made 63 league appearances and scored five goals in his first spell at The Shay.

=== Mansfield Town ===
The summer of 1982 saw Ayre move again, this time to Mansfield Town, then managed by Stuart Boam. He spent two seasons with the Stags, making 67 league appearances and scoring seven goals. He scored a headed goal on his first-team debut in a Football League Trophy tie at Field Mill.

The following season, 1983–84, Ayre found himself acting as caretaker manager after the sacking of Boam. Ian Greaves was eventually appointed as the new manager, and Ayre was released on a free transfer.

=== Halifax Town ===
Ayre re-joined Halifax for a second spell in 1984. In two years, he made 32 league appearances and scored two goals. He brought his playing career to a close with the club in 1986. On 5 August 1987, Halifax played a benefit match for Ayre against Halifax RLFC. At this point, he was the club's manager.

== Managerial career ==
=== Halifax ===
In October 1984, Ayre took over as caretaker manager of Halifax for less than a month. Mick Jones, who was godfather to Ayre's daughter, Rachel, was installed on 10 November.

In December 1986, Ayre became manager of Halifax again, this time on a full-time basis. (He was also managing director of the club.) Three years later, in April of the 1989–90 season, he resigned, having failed to get them out of the league's basement division.

=== Blackpool ===
Ayre in a Blackpool shirt at Wembley Stadium in May 1992

A few days after departing Halifax, Ayre joined Blackpool as assistant to manager Jimmy Mullen. After Mullen's departure at the end of the month, Ayre worked alongside caretaker manager Tom White. Graham Carr was installed during the close season, and he kept Ayre on as assistant. When Carr himself was sacked in November 1990, Ayre was promoted in his place. His first game in charge was a draw at Hereford United on 1 December 1990. As Roy Calley wrote in his 1992 book, Blackpool: A Complete Record 1887–1992, Ayre, almost unknown outside the lower leagues, was "greeted reservedly by Blackpool supporters, yet in the space of two years [had] become the club's most popular – and certainly most successful – boss since Stan Mortensen". On matchdays, he wore the number 15 Blackpool shirt, in the days when only three substitutes (numbers 12 to 14) were permitted for league games.

When Carr left, Blackpool were lying in eighteenth position in the Division Four table; six months later, however, the team had qualified for the play-offs after losing only five of their remaining thirty games. Between 10 November 1990 and 19 November 1991 two new (and still existing) club records were set: fifteen consecutive home League wins in what turned out to be a twenty-four-game unbeaten run at Bloomfield Road. (The match that set the ball rolling, a 4–2 victory over Aldershot, was under the guidance of Carr.) Their good fortune came undone at the last hurdle, however, when they lost in a penalty shoot-out to Torquay United in the final at Wembley and remained in the Fourth Division for another season. (In an interview at the final whistle, Ayre said, "I've never had a worse moment in my life, never mind football.")

Ayre was able to keep largely the same team together and guided them back to Wembley the following 1991–92 season, in which they finally gained promotion after another, more successful penalties experience. Scunthorpe United were the unlucky team on this occasion. Blackpool had booked their place in the new Division Two. Ayre dedicated the victory to his parents, who died the previous year. Ayre's son, David, was Blackpool's mascot, and accompanied his father in the pre-match walk out to the centre circle.

The following season saw the Seasiders finish in a lowly eighteenth position after winning only twelve of their forty-six games.

On the final day of the 1993–94 season, Blackpool avoided relegation by a single point by virtue of beating Leyton Orient 4–1 at Bloomfield Road. Ayre was sacked in June by then-chairman Owen Oyston after the Seasiders failed to impress at their new level. He was succeeded by Sam Allardyce. Ayre's league record in his three and a half years at Bloomfield Road: 191 games, 77 wins, 70 draws, 44 losses. At the time of his departure, Ayre was the sixth-longest-serving Blackpool manager in terms of Football League games in charge.

Ayre achieved not only promotion but subsequently survival with very little financial backing from Oyston. After a defeat at his former club, Hartlepool United, on 2 October 1992, Ayre confronted the travelling support, who had been shouting to Ayre to spend some money. He explained how his access to finances were tied by his chairman. During this period, players such as Alan Wright, Paul Groves, and, most notably, Trevor Sinclair all left the club for bigger and better things. Despite this, Ayre's sides battled, grafted, and occasionally shocked sides with far greater resources at their disposal. As demonstrated in the retrospective DVD The Seasiders, a feature of the Geordie's time at Bloomfield Road was his "ticker-tape entrance" in games at Bloomfield Road – fans throwing paper aloft whilst Ayre made his way across to the dugout on the east side of the ground. He would acknowledge the fans, then clench his fists, urging the Seasiders' faithful to back his team.

=== Scarborough ===
Ayre's next stop was Scarborough, where he arrived in August 1994, some twenty years after playing for the Yorkshiremen. His reign at the McCain Stadium lasted four months, after he was sacked for failing to turn around the Division Three strugglers.

=== Southport ===
A short-but-successful stint at non-League Southport followed during the 1994–95 season. Ayre had guided the Sandgrounders to a third-placed finishing position. He continued to manage the club in the 1995–96 season, in which they finished in sixth position.

=== Swansea City ===
In March 1996, Ayre was asked by new Swansea City boss Jan Mølby to be his assistant, but the duo arrived too late to prevent the Swans from sliding into Division Three. They reached the play-off final a year later, but a last-minute goal saw them lose to Northampton Town and miss out on promotion. Ayre and Mølby were both sacked soon after the disappointment.

=== Cardiff City ===
Ayre then assisted Frank Burrows at Cardiff City and helped them to promotion to Division Two in 1998–99.

After a month-long break while having a benign tumor removed, Ayre was installed to the manager's seat at Cardiff when Burrows resigned in January 2000. "This came as a complete shock," he said at the time. "I was on the motorway driving back to South Wales when the chairman rang me. I want to keep the job, and I hope I'm given the chance to prove myself."

"There will be changes," he continued. "I will be tweaking a few things, and we will be looking at the playing system. I'm still stunned about what has happened, but we have to revitalise and rejuvenate the team quickly. Frank Burrows brought me to Cardiff and did everything within his power for the club. But we have to look forward, we have to work quickly. That's what Frank would want."

Regarding the tumor, Ayre said: "That wasn't something which bothered me too much. That may sound strange, but it was outside my control, so I got on with things. Now the Cardiff City job has been given to me, albeit temporarily for now, and that is within my control. I haven't spoken to Frank yet, because he has gone away. But I will talk to him soon."

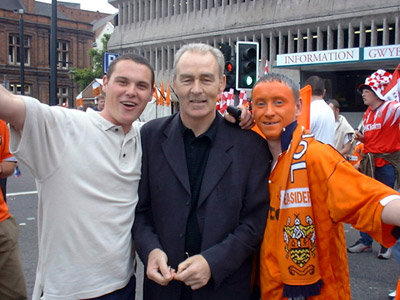
Ayre (centre) in 2001 on 26 May 2001 at the Millennium Stadium, Cardiff, just under a year before his death

Also regarding his tumor, he stated: "I'm not at all frightened. I know the risks. The odds of people not even surviving the treatment are 20–1, but that doesn't bother me. I've backed a few 20–1 winners in my time. One in four people get cancer, and I'm pleased it's me and not somebody else in my family. I'd rather take it, because I think I can deal with it."

Ayre stayed on beyond the end of the season despite the Bluebirds falling back into Division Three. He was demoted to assistant manager when owner Sam Hammam installed Bobby Gould in August 2000. His services were disposed of completely two months later when Alan Cork was put in charge of first-team affairs and Gould was appointed general manager.

=== Bury ===
Ayre's final job in football came within weeks of leaving Cardiff. He joined Division Two side Bury as assistant to Andy Preece, but in the spring of 2001 it was found that the lymph node cancer he had initially been diagnosed with in 1995 had returned. Graham Barrow was given the temporary job of assistant manager while Ayre received treatment for his illness, and he appeared to be recovering; however, he suffered a setback in early 2002 and was admitted to Clatterbridge Hospital in Bebington, Merseyside.

== Death ==
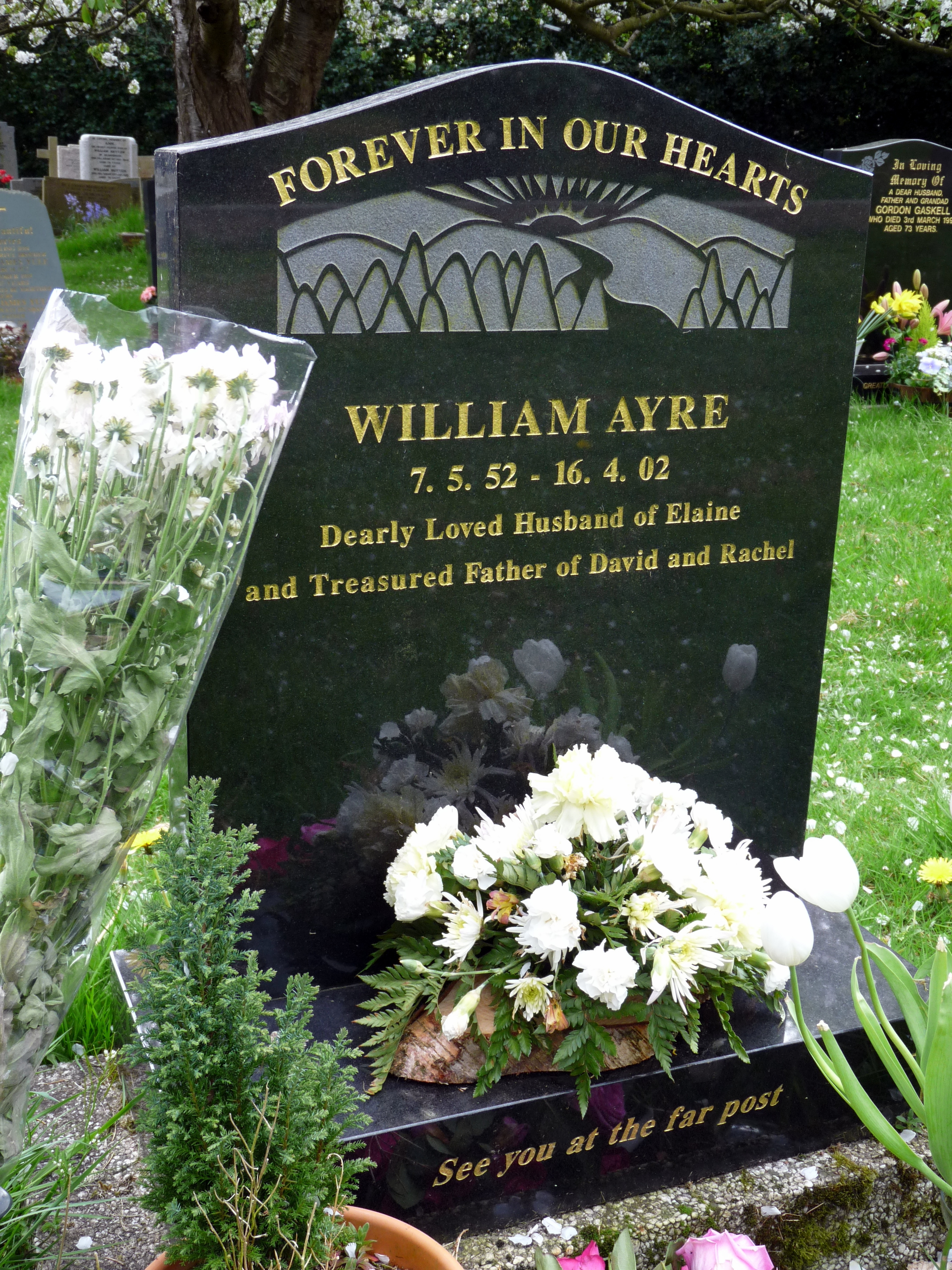
Ayre's grave at St Cuthbert's Churchyard in Halsall

Ayre died from cancer on 16 April 2002, aged 49.

During a Tranmere Rovers v. Cardiff City league encounter four days after Ayre's death, the away fans rang out an impromptu rendition of "There's Only One Billy Ayre", followed by spontaneous applause, in honour of their former manager. Mark Bonner, who Ayre nurtured through from the Blackpool youth ranks, was in the Cardiff team that day.

Ayre's funeral took place on 21 April at St. Cuthbert's Church in Halsall, near Ormskirk, and his final wish was to have the Blackpool team with whom he won promotion in 1992 be present. His wish was granted.

During the service, Revd. Heather Penman related an event that had touched Ayre during the final year of his life. On 26 May 2001, Ayre had attended the Football League Two play-off final between Blackpool and Leyton Orient at the Millennium Stadium in his then-home, Cardiff. As he was walking to the stadium, he was spotted by some Blackpool fans, who proceeded to pick up their former manager and carry him shoulder-high into the stadium. "I expect he did that famous fist sign as they took him in," said Penman. "And Elaine said Billy was absolutely delighted by that gesture."

"He was a fantastic fella, I couldn't speak highly enough about him," said Phil Brown, who played alongside Ayre at Hartlepool United and Halifax Town and under him at the latter. "He tried to play the game the way it should be played. He had a funny side to him that not many people saw, and had the ability to turn a serious situation and make light of it. He was the salt of the earth, a man you could trust with your life. There weren't many people like him."

On 17 April 2012, ten minutes into Blackpool's Championship fixture with Leeds United at Bloomfield Road, the home support sang "Billy Ayre's tangerine army", for ten minutes, while a photograph of their former manager appeared on the television screen, along with the words "Billy Ayre, gone but never forgotten". It marked ten years and one day since the death of Ayre. His daughter, Rachel, was in attendance.

On 5 October 2012, a special tribute evening was held at Bloomfield Road in his honour. A specially-commissioned painting of Ayre was unveiled by his widow, his daughter and his son.

To mark two decades since Ayre's death, a minute's applause was held in the 15th minute of Blackpool's match against Birmingham City at Bloomfield Road on 18 April 2022. Ayre was also featured on the front cover of the matchday programme. His wife and children were in attendance at the match, after which Blackpool manager Neil Critchley said he remembered Ayre when he used to bring his teams to Crewe Alexandra in the 1990s. "I remember him as a young boy myself, growing up when I was at Crewe. I remember Blackpool coming and seeing Billy, and he was different because he wore the kit. But you could see the passion he had, and you could see the connection he had with the Blackpool supporters."

== Managerial statistics ==
League games only. Only statistics that are available are listed.

Team	Nation	From	To	Record				
Team	Nation	From	To	G	W	D	L	Win %
Blackpool	(England)	30 November 1990	10 June 1994	191	77	44	70	40.31
Scarborough	(England)	1 August 1994	12 December 1994	25	6	5	14	24.00
Southport	(England)	22 March 1995	4 May 1996	55	23	14	18	41.81
Cardiff City	(Wales)	2 February 2000	14 August 2000	19	5	7	7	26.31

== Honours ==
=== As a player ===
Individual

- Hartlepool United Player of the 1970s

=== As a manager ===
Blackpool

- Football League Fourth Division play-offs: 1992
- Lancashire Senior Cup: 1993–94
