= Gary Brook (footballer) =

English footballer (born 1964)

Personal information
- Date of birth: 9 May 1964 (age 62)
- Place of birth: Dewsbury, England
- Position: Striker

Senior career*
Years	Team	Apps	(Gls)
?–1987	Frickley Athletic		
1987–1988	Newport County	14	(2)
1988–1989	Scarborough	64	(15)
1989–1992	Blackpool	30	(6)
1990	→ Notts County (loan)	1	(0)
1990	→ Scarborough (loan)	8	(0)
1998–2003	→ Ossett Town		

Managerial career
- 1994–1995: Gainsborough Trinity
- 1998–2003: Ossett Town
- 2005–2006: Bradford Park Avenue
- * Club domestic league appearances and goals

Gary Brook (born 9 May 1964) is an English former footballer.

He played for Frickley Athletic, Newport County, Scarborough, Blackpool, Notts County and Ossett Town

He later managed three clubs. Victories under his stewardship include a 4–0 away win at Harrogate Town and a 5–2 home victory over Radcliffe Borough.
