= 1991 Football League Fourth Division play-off final =

Association football match

- The match was played at Wembley Stadium.
- Event: 1990–91 Football League Fourth Division
Blackpool	Torquay United
2	2
- After extra time Torquay United won 5–4 on penalties
- Date: 31 May 1991
- Venue: Wembley Stadium, London
- Referee: George Courtney
- Attendance: 21,615

The 1991 Football League Fourth Division play-off final was an association football match played on 31 May 1991 at the Wembley Stadium, London, between Blackpool and Torquay United. The match determined the fifth and final team to gain promotion from the Football League Fourth Division, English football's fourth tier, to the Third Division. The top four teams of the 1990–91 Fourth Division season gained automatic promotion to the Third Division, while those placed from fifth to eighth in the table took part in play-offs, the semi-final winners of which competed for the final place for the 1991–92 season in the Third Division. Blackpool finished in fifth place while Torquay ended the season in seventh position. Burnley and Scunthorpe United were the losing semi-finalists, being defeated by Torquay and Blackpool respectively.

The match was refereed by George Courtney in front of a crowd of 21,615. Paul Groves opened the scoring for Blackpool with an angled shot from 8 yards (7.3 m) following a pass from Mark Taylor after seven minutes. Torquay equalised on 28 minutes after a cross from Mark Loram was headed past Steve McIlhargey, the Blackpool goalkeeper, by Wes Saunders. In the 37th minute, Dave Bamber was adjudged to have handled a cross from Paul Holmes in the Blackpool penalty area and Dean Edwards scored the penalty make it 2–1 to Torquay at half time. After the interval, Blackpool dominated the game and scored the equaliser in the 76th minute with an own goal from Chris Curran, and the match ended 2–2 and went into extra time. No goals were scored in additional time so the match had to be decided by a penalty shootout. The first two shots were saved before the next nine penalties were converted. Bamber then sliced his shot wide of the goal, concluding the shootout with a 5–4 victory to Torquay who were promoted to the Third Division for the first time in 20 years. It was the first play-off final to be decided by a penalty shootout.

In their following season, Blackpool finished in fourth position in the Fourth Division and participated in the play-offs where they defeated Scunthorpe United on penalties in the final. Torquay United ended their next season in 23rd place in the Third Division table and were relegated back to the Fourth Division after a single season.

== Route to the final ==
Football League Fourth Division final table, leading positions
Pos	Team	Pld	W	D	L	GF	GA	GD	Pts
1	Darlington	46	22	17	7	68	38	+30	83
2	Stockport County	46	23	13	10	84	47	+37	82
3	Hartlepool United	46	24	10	12	67	48	+19	82
4	Peterborough United	46	21	17	8	67	45	+22	80
5	Blackpool	46	23	10	13	78	47	+31	79
6	Burnley	46	23	10	13	70	51	+19	79
7	Torquay United	46	18	18	10	64	47	+17	72
8	Scunthorpe United	46	20	11	15	71	62	+9	71

Blackpool finished the regular 1990–91 season in fifth place in the Football League Fourth Division, the fourth tier of the English football league system, two positions ahead of Torquay United. Both therefore missed out on the four automatic places for promotion to the Third Division and instead took part in the play-offs to determine the fifth promoted team. Blackpool finished one point behind Peterborough United (who were promoted in fourth place), three behind Hartlepool and Stockport County (who were promoted in third and second place respectively), and four behind league winners Darlington. Torquay ended the season seven points behind Blackpool, who missed out on automatic promotion when they lost their final league game to finish fifth.

Torquay United faced Burnley in their play-off semi-final with the first match of the two-legged tie being held at Plainmoor in Torquay on 19 May 1991. Dean Edwards opened the scoring for the home side before Burnley's David Hamilton was shown the red card for a late tackle on Micky Holmes. Five minutes later Matt Elliott doubled Torquay's lead and the match ended 2–0. The second leg was played three days later at Turf Moor in Burnley. The home team dominated the game but it was not until the 89th minute that they scored through an own goal from Stewart Evans. The match ended 1–0 to Burnley but Torquay progressed to the final with a 2–1 aggregate victory.

Blackpool's opponents for their play-off semi-final were Scunthorpe United and the first leg took place at Glanford Park in Scunthorpe on 19 May 1991. After a goalless first half, Tony Rodwell put the visitors ahead in the 57th minute before Steve Lister was sent off for insulting the linesman. Twenty minutes later, Mark Lillis turned with the ball and struck an equaliser to ensure the match ended 1–1. The second leg was held on 22 May 1991 at Bloomfield Road in Blackpool. Scunthorpe took the lead in the 38th minute with a 30 yards (27 m) free kick off the post from Dave Hill. Eleven minutes after half-time, David Eyres scored from an Andy Garner cross. In the 67th minute, Eyres then scored from a headed pass from Garner to make it 2–1, and Blackpool progressed to the final 3–2 on aggregate.

== Match ==
=== Background ===
This was Blackpool's first appearance in the English Football League play-offs and their first appearance at the national stadium since the 1953 FA Cup Final where they defeated Bolton Wanderers. Stan Mortensen, who had scored a hat-trick for Blackpool in that final, had died the previous week. The club had played in the Fourth Division for a single season having been relegated in the 1989–90 season. Billy Ayre had taken over as manager of Blackpool in December 1990 with the team sixth from bottom but led them into the play-offs with a club-record winning streak of 13 games at home. Torquay were making their second appearance in the play-offs having lost in the semi-finals in 1988. They had played in the Fourth Division after being relegated in the 1971–72 season. Their manager Dave Smith had been replaced by John Impey in April 1991 after the side had slipped from top to mid-table. This was Torquay's second visit to Wembley Stadium, their previous appearance being in the 1988–89 Associate Members' Cup which they lost 4–1 against Bolton Wanderers. In the matches between the clubs during the regular season, each side won their home game: Torquay secured a 2–1 victory in October 1990 while Blackpool won 1–0 the following March.

The referee for the match was George Courtney.

=== Summary ===
The match kicked off around 8 p.m. on 31 May 1991 in front of a crowd of 21,615. Paul Groves opened the scoring for Blackpool with an angled shot from 8 yards (7.3 m) following a pass from Mark Taylor after seven minutes. Torquay equalised on 28 minutes after a Mark Loram cross was headed past Steve McIlhargey, the Blackpool goalkeeper, by Wes Saunders. In the 37th minute, Dave Bamber was adjudged to have handled a cross from Paul Holmes in the Blackpool penalty area and Edwards dispatched the resulting spot kick to make it 2–1 to Torquay at half time. After the interval, Blackpool dominated the game and scored the equaliser in the 76th minute: Garner's overhead kick was tipped onto the crossbar by Torquay's goalkeeper Gareth Howells before Chris Curran played the ball into the net for an own goal. Regular time ended with the score as 2–2 and the game went into extra time.

Bamber scored in extra time but his goal was disallowed as he was adjudged to have been offside. Both Elliott and Evans had shots cleared from beneath the Blackpool crossbar and the game ended 2–2 sending it to a penalty shootout. Loram and Rodwell both saw their shots saved before the next nine penalties were converted. Bamber then sliced his shot wide of the goal, concluding the shootout with a 5–4 victory to Torquay who were promoted to the Third Division for the first time in 20 years.

=== Details ===
31 May 1991	Blackpool	2–2 (a.e.t.) (4–5 p)	Torquay United	Wembley Stadium, London
20:00 UTC	Groves 7'; Curran 76' (o.g.)		Saunders 28'; Edwards 37' (pen.)	Attendance: 21,615; Referee: George Courtney
	Penalties
	Rodwell (penalty missed); Taylor (penalty scored); Gore (penalty scored); Groves (penalty scored); Garner (penalty scored); Bamber (penalty missed)		(penalty missed) Loram; (penalty scored) M. Holmes; (penalty scored) Saunders; (penalty scored) P. Holmes; (penalty scored) Myers; (penalty scored) Howells

GK	1	Steve McIlhargey
RB	2	Mike Davies (substituted off) 103'
CB	3	Alan Wright
CB	4	Paul Groves
LB	5	Phil Horner
RM	6	Ian Gore
CM	7	Tony Rodwell
CM	8	Mark Taylor
FW	9	Dave Bamber
FW	10	Andy Garner
LM	11	David Eyres
Substitutes:
MF	12	Trevor Sinclair (substituted in) 103'
Manager:
Billy Ayre

GK	1	Gareth Howells
RB	2	Chris Curran
CB	3	Paul Holmes
CB	4	Wes Saunders
LB	5	Matt Elliott
RM	6	Sean Joyce
CM	7	Chris Myers
CM	8	Micky Holmes
FW	9	Stewart Evans (substituted off) 115'
FW	10	Dean Edwards (substituted off) 87'
LM	11	Mark Loram
Substitutes:
MF	12	Andy Rowland (substituted in) 115'
FW	13	Paul Hall (substituted in) 87'
Manager:
John Impey

== Post-match ==
It was the first time that a play-off final had been settled by a penalty shootout and there was some dismay in the media over the method. Keith Blackmore, writing in The Times, described it as "the least desirable way" to win the match and a "sad conclusion", while Rothmans Football Yearbook described the game as being "settled by that most unsatisfactory of methods" and that "such an outcome did nothing to enhance the wretched reputation of this most misguided vehicle for deciding football matches". Ayre, the defeated manager, said "It is unfortunate from our point of view but we knew the rules, and we abide by them. There's no use complaining about it".

In their following season, Blackpool finished in fourth position in the Fourth Division and participated in the play-offs where they defeated Scunthorpe United on penalties in the final. Torquay manager Impey was sacked in October 1991 with the club second from bottom, having lost eight of their first ten league matches. They ended their next season in 23rd place in the Third Division table and were relegated back to the Fourth Division after a single season.
