= 1989 Associate Members' Cup final =

1989 Associate Members' Cup Final
- Event: 1988–89 Associate Members' Cup
Bolton Wanderers	Torquay United
4	1
- Date: 28 May 1989
- Venue: Wembley Stadium, London
- Attendance: 46,513

The 1989 Associate Members' Cup Final, known as the Sherpa Van Trophy for sponsorship reasons, was the 6th final of the domestic football cup competition for teams from the Third Division and Fourth Division. The final was played at Wembley Stadium, London on 28 May 1989, and was contested by Bolton Wanderers and Torquay United. Bolton won the match 4–1, with Julian Darby, Dean Crombie, Trevor Morgan and Jeff Chandler scoring the goals for the winning team.

== Match details ==
28 May 1989

Bolton Wanderers	4–1	Torquay United
Darby; Crombie; Morgan; Chandler	Report	Edwards

Wembley Stadium, London
Attendance: 46,513
Referee: G.Courtney (Spennymoor)

Bolton Wanderers	Torquay United

David Felgate
Phil Brown
Barry Cowdrill
Robbie Savage
Dean Crombie
Mark Winstanley
Jeff Chandler	(substituted off) 81'
Steve Thompson
Trevor Morgan
John Thomas
Julian Darby
Substitutes:
Stuart Storer	(substituted on) 81'
Manager:
Phil Neal

Kenny Allen
Daral Pugh
Tom Kelly
Jim McNichol
Matt Elliott
Mark Loram
Carl Airey	(substituted off) 73'
Phil Lloyd
Dean Edwards
Ian Weston	(substituted off) 74'
John Morrison
Substitutes:
Sean William Joyce	(substituted on) 74'
Paul Smith	(substituted on) 73'
Manager:
Cyril Knowles
