= List of Torquay United F.C. managers =

Torquay United Football Club is an English professional association football club based in Torquay, Devon. This is a chronological list of all Torquay United managers from 1921 until the current season.

== History ==
When the second incarnation of Torquay United was formed by the merger of Torquay Town and Babbacombe in 1921, Torquay Town striker Crad Evans was installed as the club's first player-manager. After three seasons at Plainmoor, he was succeeded by Harry Raymond before Percy Mackrill took over the reins in 1925. Under Mackrill, United won the Southern League Western Section in 1927 and were elected to the Football League later that same year. Despite requiring re-election after the club's first League season, Torquay managed to establish a place in the Third Division South, albeit without ever finishing any higher than 10th position in all the seasons leading up to World War II. The club's most successful pre-War manager was Frank Brown who achieved three top 10 finishes in six seasons until 1938. After the War, Johnny McNeil brought greater success to the club and had led Torquay to second place in the Third Division South before suddenly leaving in March 1950. Unable to maintain the momentum following McNeil's departure, United eventually had to settle for a 5th-place finish.

Torquay's longest serving manager, Eric Webber, joined the club in October 1951 and remained in charge for nearly fourteen years. During this period, Torquay achieved their best ever finish to a season after narrowly missing out on promotion to the Second Division in 1957. When the League was divided into four nationwide divisions, Webber oversaw Torquay's first ever promotion after finishing third in Division Four in 1960. Torquay only lasted two seasons in Division Three and Webber eventually parted company with the club in 1965. Webber's successor, Frank O'Farrell, achieved promotion back to Division Three in 1966 after only his first season in charge. This marked the beginning of Torquay's most successful period to date, enjoying six consecutive seasons in the Third Division. However, O'Farrell himself left the club in December 1968 to take over the manager's job at Leicester City before eventually becoming manager of Manchester United in the summer of 1971.

O'Farrell's departure triggered a slow decline in Torquay's fortunes. His successor Allan Brown managed to keep Torquay in Division Three before being sacked in October 1971. However, Brown's replacement, Jack Edwards, failed to maintain the club's Third Division status and they were relegated in 1972. With Edwards unable to return Torquay to Division Three, the rest of the 1970s saw Malcolm Musgrove and then Mike Green preside over a period which was largely characterised by falling attendances and (at best) mid-table finishes. This was despite Frank O'Farrell returning to take temporary charge of first team affairs before the appointment of Green in 1977. O'Farrell would take over for one more season after Green's departure in 1981 while at the same time grooming his successor Bruce Rioch. After Rioch left the club under unfortunate circumstances in 1984, things got even worse for Torquay with the arrival of David Webb, whose reign coincided with two rock bottom League finishes and a fire which destroyed part of the grandstand at Plainmoor. Later preferring to concentrate on his role as the club's Managing Director, Webb eventually appointed Stuart Morgan as first-team manager in 1985. Morgan was the man in charge in 1987 when a last minute equaliser against Crewe Alexandra on the final day of the season saved Torquay from relegation to the Football Conference.

Arriving in the summer of 1987, Cyril Knowles managed to revitalise Torquay United and led the club to the Division Four play-offs in 1988. The following year, Knowles was responsible for Torquay's first ever Wembley appearance after reaching the 1989 Sherpa Van Trophy Final. The former Tottenham man was also notable for introducing a young Lee Sharpe to the Torquay first-team, attracting the attention of Manchester United who were prepared to pay a club record £185,000 for the teenager in 1988. Dave Smith replaced Knowles in 1989 and helped build the squad which eventually beat Blackpool in the 1991 Division Four play-off final, although John Impey was the man in charge for Torquay's second appearance at Wembley after Smith had left the club just weeks before the final. However, Impey would not survive as manager for long and Torquay were relegated after only one season in Division Three.

The next two decades would see a succession of managers experience a wide variety of fortunes at Plainmoor. Yugoslavian Ivan Golac lasted barely a few months in 1992, while Paul Compton needed the experienced Neil Warnock to take over and save Torquay from the threat of relegation to the Conference in 1993. Don O'Riordan performed well enough to get United to the 1994 Division Three play-offs before being sacked in 1995 with the club again in danger of losing its League status. Kevin Hodges guided Torquay to another Wembley play-off final in 1998, but were second best to Colchester United on that occasion. Just three years later, the club had to call upon the experience of ex-Torquay striker Colin Lee to replace Wes Saunders when the club were again veering perilously close to non-League football in 2001. Nevertheless, by 2004 the club's fortunes had changed yet again with Leroy Rosenior becoming the first Torquay manager since Frank O'Farrell in 1966 to achieve automatic promotion. However, Torquay would again only enjoy one season in the newly named League One, and by 2006, it was the turn of Ian Atkins to pull off the 'great escape' and keep United in the Football League. While he was successful on that occasion, with turmoil on and off the pitch throughout the following season, neither Atkins nor Luboš Kubík nor Keith Curle could prevent Torquay from finally dropping out of League football in 2007.

It had been announced that Rosenior would have a second term as manager, but the club changed hands before that came to pass; the job of returning Torquay to the Football League was given to former United midfielder Paul Buckle. Despite a largely successful first campaign in the Conference, United would lose in the play-off semi-finals to local rivals Exeter City, while a week later, a first appearance at the new Wembley Stadium would result in more disappointment with a defeat by Ebbsfleet United in the 2008 FA Trophy Final. However, Torquay would make another return to Wembley the following season and were this time victorious after beating Cambridge United in the Conference play-off final, ensuring United's return to League Two after only a two-year absence. In 2011, at the end of Paul Buckle's fourth season in charge, Torquay reached the League Two play-off final at Old Trafford but were beaten by Stevenage. Immediately after the defeat, Buckle accepted an offer to become the new Bristol Rovers manager which led to the appointment of the current Torquay manager, former Leyton Orient and Cambridge boss, Martin Ling. With Ling currently on long-term sick leave, after Alan Knill successfully kept Torquay afloat, Martin Ling was sacked immediately and Knill was appointed permanently 2 weeks later.

== Managers ==
Statistics include all first team competitive matches from 1921 until 21st Nov 2026.

It does not include statistics for any pre-season friendlies, Wartime Leagues or Devon County tournaments such as the Devon Senior Cup or Devon Bowl.

Name	Nationality	From	To	P	W	D^{[A]}	L	Win%^{[B]}	Honours and achievements	Refs
Crad Evans	Wales	July 1921	May 1924	104	54	21	29	51.92		
Harry Raymond	England	July 1924	December 1924	16	5	5	6	31.25		
F.G.B. Mortimer	England	December 1924	May 1925	25	5	7	13	20.00		
Percy Mackrill	South Africa	July 1925	March 1929	176	76	37	63	43.18	1926–27 Southern League Winners; 1926–27 Western League Runners-up; Election to 1927–28 Football League	
unknown ^{[C]}		March 1929	May 1929	14	4	4	6	28.57		
Frank Womack	England	July 1929	May 1932	132	41	30	61	31.06		
Frank Brown	England	May 1932	May 1938	279	93	62	124	33.33	1933–34 Third Division South Cup Runners-up	
Alf Steward ^{[D]}	England	May 1938	May 1940	48	18	10	20	37.50	1938–39 Third Division South Cup Finalists ^{[E]}	
Billy Butler ^{[F]}	England	August 1945	May 1946	2	0	1	1	0.00		
Jack Butler	England	June 1946	May 1947	43	15	12	16	34.88		
Johnny McNeil	Scotland	June 1947	March 1950	130	53	33	44	40.77		
Bob John	Wales	March 1950	November 1950	27	6	7	14	22.22		
Alex Massie	Scotland	November 1950	October 1951	42	10	9	23	23.81		
Eric Webber	England	25 October 1951	3 May 1965	680	275	164	241	40.44	1956–57 Third Division South Runners-up; Promotion to 1960–61 Division Three	
Frank O'Farrell	Ireland	May 1965	14 December 1968	177	79	40	58	44.63	Promotion to 1966–67 Division Three	
Jack Edwards (caretaker)	Wales	14 December 1968	8 January 1969	2	0	1	1	0.00		
Allan Brown	Scotland	8 January 1969	11 October 1971	140	50	43	47	35.71		
Jack Edwards	Wales	11 October 1971	January 1973	68	18	16	34	26.47		
Malcolm Musgrove	England	January 1973	22 November 1976	188	61	58	69	32.45		
Lew Chatterley (caretaker)	England	22 November 1976	November 1976	1	0	0	1	0.00		
Frank O'Farrell (caretaker)	Ireland	November 1976	March 1977	14	4	2	8	28.57		
Mike Green	England	March 1977	May 1981	221	82	54	85	37.10		
Frank O'Farrell	Ireland	June 1981	June 1982	53	14	18	21	26.42		
Bruce Rioch	Scotland	July 1982	14 January 1984	86	32	18	36	37.21		
Jimmy Hargreaves (caretaker)	England	16 January 1984	4 February 1984	2	1	0	1	50.00		
David Webb	England	4 February 1984	21 August 1985	75	20	20	35	26.67		
John Sims	England	21 August 1985	21 September 1985	8	1	1	6	12.50		
Stuart Morgan	Wales	23 September 1985	21 May 1987	96	20	32	44	20.83		
Cyril Knowles	England	22 June 1987	30 September 1989	133	55	28	50	41.35	1988 Division Four play-off Runners-up; 1989 League Trophy Runners-up	
Dave Smith	Scotland	7 October 1989	2 April 1991	90	34	31	25	37.78		
John Impey	England	6 April 1991	8 October 1991	28	10	4	14	35.71	1991 Division Four play-off Winners	
Wes Saunders (caretaker)	England	9 October 1991	February 1992	23	7	5	11	30.43		
Ivan Golac	Yugoslavia	February 1992	May 1992	19	5	4	10	26.32		
Paul Compton	England	May 1992	February 1993	35	9	3	23	25.71		
Neil Warnock	England	15 February 1993	2 June 1993	15	5	5	5	33.33		
Don O'Riordan	Ireland	June 1993	29 October 1995	122	38	39	45	31.15	1994 Division Three play-off Semi-finals	
Paul Compton; Kevin Hodges (caretakers)	England; England	29 October 1995	November 1995	2	0	0	2	0.00		
Mick Buxton (caretaker)	England	November 1995	17 November 1995	1	0	0	1	0.00		
Eddie May	England	17 November 1995	May 1996	32	3	11	18	9.38		
Kevin Hodges	England	May 1996	June 1998	107	38	26	43	35.51	1998 Division Three play-off Runners-up	
Wes Saunders	England	June 1998	28 March 2001	149	47	42	60	31.54		
Colin Lee	England	28 March 2001	2 July 2001	9	3	4	2	33.33		
Roy McFarland	England	20 July 2001	23 April 2002	50	13	15	22	26.00		
Leroy Rosenior	Sierra Leone	9 May 2002	25 January 2006	184	59	59	66	32.07	Promotion to 2004–05 League One	
John Cornforth	Wales	26 January 2006	13 April 2006	12	4	3	5	33.33		
Ian Atkins	England	26 January 2006	27 November 2006	28	9	7	12	32.14		
Luboš Kubík	Czech Republic	27 November 2006	5 February 2007	15	2	5	8	13.33		
Keith Curle	England	8 February 2007	17 May 2007	15	2	4	9	13.33		
Paul Buckle	England	2 June 2007	30 May 2011	226	104	58	64	46.02	2008 Conference National play-off Semi-finals; 2008 FA Trophy Runners-up; 2009 Conference National play-off Winners; 2011 League Two play-off Runners-up	
Martin Ling	England	13 June 2011	15 January 2013^{[H]}	81	32	23	26	39.51	2012 League Two play-off Semi-finals	
Shaun Taylor (caretaker)	England	28 January 2013	19 February 2013	6	1	0	5	16.67		
Alan Knill	Wales	20 February 2013	2 January 2014	41	9	12	20	21.95		
Chris Hargreaves	England	6 January 2014	15 June 2015	75	27	15	33	36.00		
Paul Cox	England	17 June 2015	18 September 2015	10	2	4	4	20.00		
Kevin Nicholson	England	28 September 2015	17 August 2017	93	28	23	42	30.11		
Robbie Herrera (caretaker)	England	17 August 2017	12 September 2017	6	0	2	4	0.00		
Gary Owers	England	12 September 2017	12 September 2018	45	12	12	21	26.67		
Gary Johnson	England	13 September 2018	22 February 2024	229	104	50	75	45.41	2018-19 National League South Winners; 2020-21 National League play-off Runners-up	
Aaron Downes (caretaker)	Australia	22 February 2024	14 May 2024	13	5	3	5	38.46		
Paul Wotton	England	14 May 2024	1 March 2026	87	44	20	23	50.57	2024-25 National League South play-off Semi-finals	
Neil Warnock (caretaker)	England	1 March 2026	18 March 2026	4	2	1	1	50.00		
Jimmy Ball	England	18 March 2026	Present	30	14	7	9	46.67	2025-26 National League South play-off Runners-up	

== Notes ==
A. Drawn matches decided by penalty shoot-outs are counted as draws.
B. Win% is rounded to two decimal places.
C. Although Albert Hoskins was announced in the press as Percy Mackrill's successor, he never actually took charge of the team. Frank Womack was the man in charge from the beginning of the 1929–30 season.
D. Steward also took charge of the three drawn games of the 1939–40 season which were played before the outbreak of World War II forced the abandonment of the Football League as well as the entire 1939–40 Wartime League South Western Division season (P28 W14 D6 L8). These matches do not count towards official records.
E. Although Torquay had qualified for the Third Division South Cup Final, their opponents (either Queens Park Rangers or Port Vale) had yet to be decided. The final, which was scheduled for September 1939, was not played due to the outbreak of World War II and the tournament would never be contested again.
F. Butler also took charge of the 1945–46 Wartime Third Division South season (P36 W11 D8 L17) which was played before the recommencement of the Football League in 1946. These matches do not count towards official records.
H. Martin Ling's last game in charge before going on long-term sick leave.
