= Carl Airey =

English footballer

Personal information
- Full name: Carl Airey
- Date of birth: 6 February 1965 (age 61)
- Place of birth: Wakefield, England
- Height: 6 ft 0 in (1.83 m)
- Position: Centre forward

Senior career*
Years	Team	Apps	(Gls)
1983–1984	Barnsley	38	(5)
1983	→ Bradford City (loan)	5	(0)
1984–1986	Darlington	75	(28)
1986	Charleroi	3	(0)
1986–1987	→ Chesterfield (loan)	26	(4)
1987–1988	Rotherham United	32	(11)
1988–1990	Torquay United	29	(11)
1989	→ Shamrock Rovers (loan)	5	(0)
1990–19??	Salisbury		(5)
- * Club domestic league appearances and goals

Carl Airey (born 6 February 1965) is an English former professional footballer who made more than 200 appearances in the Football League playing as a centre forward during the 1980s.

== Career ==
Carl Airey, a bustling centre-forward, began his professional career as an apprentice with Barnsley, turning professional in February 1983 and making his league debut the same season. He also spent a period on loan at Bradford City where he failed to score in five games at the start of the 1983–84 season. He left Oakwell in August 1984, after 38 league games in which he scored five goals, joining Darlington. He was top scorer the following season as Darlington, under Cyril Knowles, won promotion to the Third Division. He went on to score 28 goals in 75 league games before his transfer to Belgian side Charleroi in May 1986. His stay in Belgium was a short one, making 3 appearances without scoring, before returning to England in December of the same year to join Chesterfield on loan for whom he played 26 league games, scoring four goals. In August 1987, Airey was on the move once more, this time to Rotherham United, where he averaged a goal every three games, scoring 11 in 32 league games. He teamed up again with Knowles and former teammate Phil Lloyd when he joined Torquay United in December 1988. He made his debut on 20 January 1989 when he came on as a substitute for Ian Weston in a 2–0 defeat away to Halifax Town. He struggled to establish himself in the starting line-up, although he did start at Wembley in the 1989 Associate Members' Cup Final against Bolton Wanderers.

The following season, he started as first choice, but soon lost his place and along with Weston joined Shamrock Rovers on loan in September 1989 where after 5 appearances he returned to the Torquay side the following month and equalled Sammy Collins' record of scoring in seven consecutive games before losing his place again and not featuring again in the first team after the end of January. He was released at the end of the season, joining Salisbury in July 1990. He was later reported to be working as a milkman in Salisbury.

== Honours ==
=== Player ===
Darlington

- Football League Fourth Division third-place promotion: 1984–85

Torquay United

- Associate Members' Cup runner-up: 1988–89
