= 1989–90 Southampton F.C. season =

Southampton F.C.
1989–90 season
- Chairman: Guy Askham
- Manager: Chris Nicholl
- Stadium: The Dell
- First Division: 7th
- FA Cup: Fifth round
- League Cup: Fifth round
- Top goalscorer: League: Matt Le Tissier (20); All: Matt Le Tissier (24)
- Highest home attendance: 20,510 v Manchester; United (24 March 1990)
- Lowest home attendance: 8,096 v York City (3 October 1989)
- Average home league attendance: 16,494
- Biggest win: 4–1 v Queens Park; Rangers (14 October 1989); 4–1 v Liverpool (21 October 1989); 6–3 v Luton Town (25 November 1989); 4–1 v Norwich City (27 February 1990); 3–0 v Coventry City (28 April 1990)
- Biggest defeat: 0–3 v Everton (26 August 1989); 0–3 v Liverpool (17 February 1990)
Home colours	Away colours	Third colours

The 1989–90 Southampton F.C. season was the club's 89th season of competitive football and their 20th in the First Division of the Football League. The season was Chris Nicholl's most successful as manager in the league, as the club finished in 7th place after four consecutive seasons finishing in the bottom half of the league table under Nicholl. Outside the First Division, the Saints reached the fifth round of both the FA Cup and the League Cup.

Southampton had a quiet summer transfer window in 1989, with the departure of Derek Statham the only business prior to the start of the league. Danny Wallace and John Burridge left during the campaign, while Ian Andrews, Sammy Lee and Oleksiy Cherednyk were brought in during the second half of the season. Following several disappointing years, the Saints enjoyed good spells of form throughout 1989–90, including several high-scoring wins and victories over title contenders such as Liverpool, Aston Villa and Arsenal. The team's best spell came during a seven-game unbeaten run between August and October, during which time they reached a season-high position of third in the table; poor spells later in the season saw them drop as low as 12th position.

In the FA Cup, Southampton beat title contenders Tottenham Hotspur in the third round, followed by a narrow victory over Second Division side Oxford United. They were knocked out in the fifth round by defending champions Liverpool, who picked up a convincing 3–0 home win. In the League Cup, the Saints made it past Fourth Division club York City, top-flight strugglers Charlton Athletic and Second Division promotion hopefuls Swindon Town, before facing elimination in a fifth round replay at the hands of another second-flight side, Oldham Athletic. The club opted out of competing in the 1989–90 Full Members' Cup.

Southampton used 23 players during the 1989–90 season and had 11 different goalscorers. Their top scorer was Matt Le Tissier, who scored 24 times in all competitions, including 20 in the league – making him the joint third-highest scorer in the division. The previous season's top scorer Rod Wallace scored 21 times and also made the most appearances for the club, playing 47 games. Le Tissier won the Southampton F.C. Player of the Season award – his first win of a record three during his career – and was also named PFA Young Player of the Year. The average league attendance at The Dell during 1989–90 was 16,494. The highest attendance was 20,510 against Manchester United on 24 March 1990 and the lowest was 8,906 against York City on 3 October 1989.

== Background and transfers ==
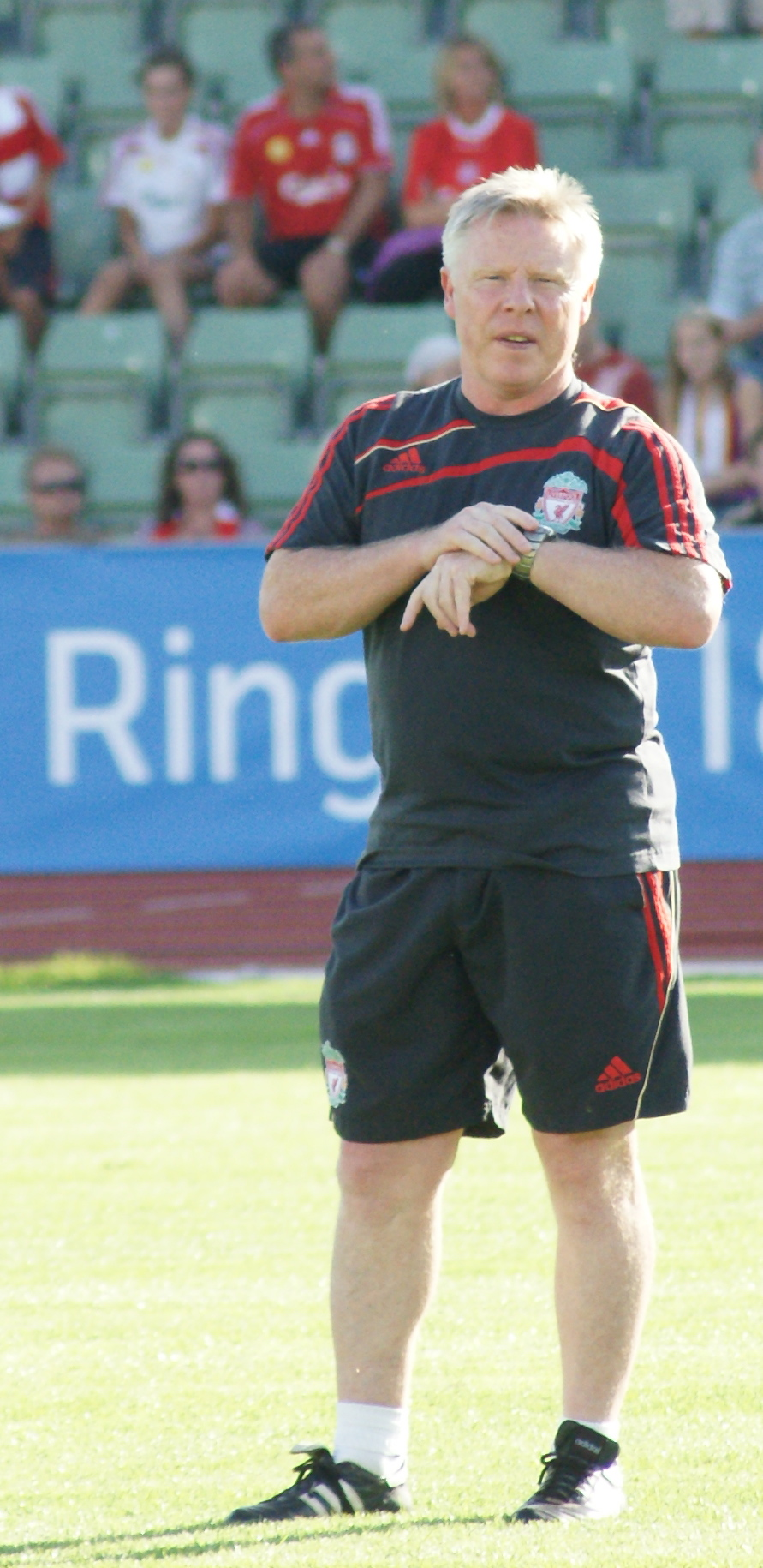
Sammy Lee signed on a free transfer in January 1990, but would make only three substitute appearances for the club before leaving in October.

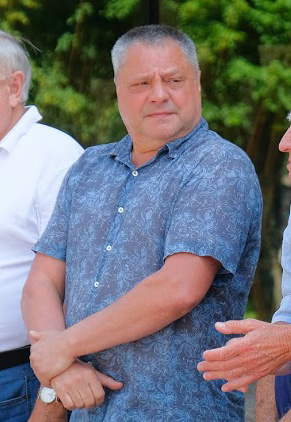
Oleksiy Cherednyk became the first Soviet player in the First Division when he signed for Southampton in March 1990.

Southampton made no signings in the summer of 1989. The only transfer involving the club prior to the start of the season was the sale of left-back Derek Statham – who had lost his place in the starting lineup to Micky Adams following injury – to Second Division side Stoke City for a fee of £75,000 as determined by a tribunal. A few games into the season, striker Danny Wallace joined Manchester United for a new Saints record fee of £1.2 million, after an offer of £750,000 was rejected. Russell Osman and Danny's brother Rod Wallace also requested transfers, but these were turned down. Also in September, Mark Blake was sent out on loan to Colchester United in the Fourth Division. The month after, John Burridge was sold to Newcastle United; and in November, Steve Davis was loaned out to Fourth Division side Burnley.

After Burridge's departure in October, Southampton brought in Celtic goalkeeper Ian Andrews on loan in December as backup for Tim Flowers, before signing him permanently for a fee of £200,000 in January 1990. The same month, midfielder Sammy Lee was signed on a free transfer from Spanish club Osasuna. Southampton's final signing of the season came towards the end of the campaign, in March 1990, when they signed Soviet Union right-back Oleksiy Cherednyk from Dnipro for a fee of £300,000. When he made his first team debut a few weeks later, he became the first Soviet player to appear in an English First Division match. In April, Blake – having returned from Colchester the previous month – was loaned out again, this time to Shrewsbury Town in the Third Division; come the end of the season, he would join the club permanently.

Players transferred in

Name	Nationality	Pos.	Club	Date	Fee	Ref.
Andy Rowland	England	FW	(England) Exmouth Town	November 1989	Unknown	
Ian Andrews	England	GK	(Scotland) Celtic	January 1990	£200,000	
Sammy Lee	England	MF	(Spain) Osasuna	January 1990	Free	
Oleksiy Cherednyk	Soviet Union	DF	(Soviet Union) Dnipro	March 1990	£300,000	

Players transferred out

Name	Nationality	Pos.	Club	Date	Fee	Ref.
Derek Statham	England	DF	(England) Stoke City	July 1989	£75,000	
Danny Wallace	England	FW	(England) Manchester United	September 1989	£1,200,000	
John Burridge	England	GK	(England) Newcastle United	October 1989	Unknown	

Players loaned in

Name	Nationality	Pos.	Club	Date from	Date to	Ref.
Ian Andrews	England	GK	(Scotland) Celtic	December 1989	January 1990	

Players loaned out

Name	Nationality	Pos.	Club	Date from	Date to	Ref.
Mark Blake	England	DF	(England) Colchester United	September 1989	March 1990	
Steve Davis	England	DF	(England) Burnley	November 1989	February 1990	
Mark Blake	England	DF	(England) Shrewsbury Town	April 1990	End of season	

== Pre-season friendlies ==
Ahead of the 1989–90 league campaign, Southampton played seven pre-season friendlies. The first two, on the same day at the end of July, saw the Saints beating non-league opponents Bath City and Farnborough 3–1 and 6–0, respectively, with Matt Le Tissier scoring a hat-trick in the latter. The club continued their winning form with 3–0 wins over Aldershot and Bashley, followed by a 6–0 victory against Swansea City, featuring another Le Tissier hat-trick. The final two pre-season games ended in draws: 2–2 away to Basingstoke Town and 3–3 at home to Soviet side Dnipro.

29 July 1989 Friendly	Bath City	1–3	Southampton	Bath
			Rideout; Ruddock; D. Wallace	Stadium: Twerton Park

29 July 1989 Friendly	Farnborough	0–6	Southampton	Farnborough
			Le Tissier; Blake; Rod Wallace; Shearer	Stadium: Cherrywood Road

1 August 1989 Friendly	Aldershot	0–3	Southampton	Aldershot
			Maddison; Shearer; Ray Wallace	Stadium: Recreation Ground

2 August 1989 Friendly	Bashley	0–3	Southampton	Bashley
			Rideout; Ruddock; Rod Wallace	Stadium: Bashley Road

4 August 1989 Friendly	Swansea City	0–6	Southampton	Swansea, Wales
			Le Tissier; Baker; Shearer; D. Wallace	Stadium: Vetch Field

7 August 1989 Friendly	Basingstoke Town	2–2	Southampton	Basingstoke
			Adams; D. Wallace	Stadium: The Camrose

11 August 1989 Friendly	Southampton	3–3	Dnipro	Southampton
	Case; Le Tissier; Rod Wallace			Stadium: The Dell

== First Division ==
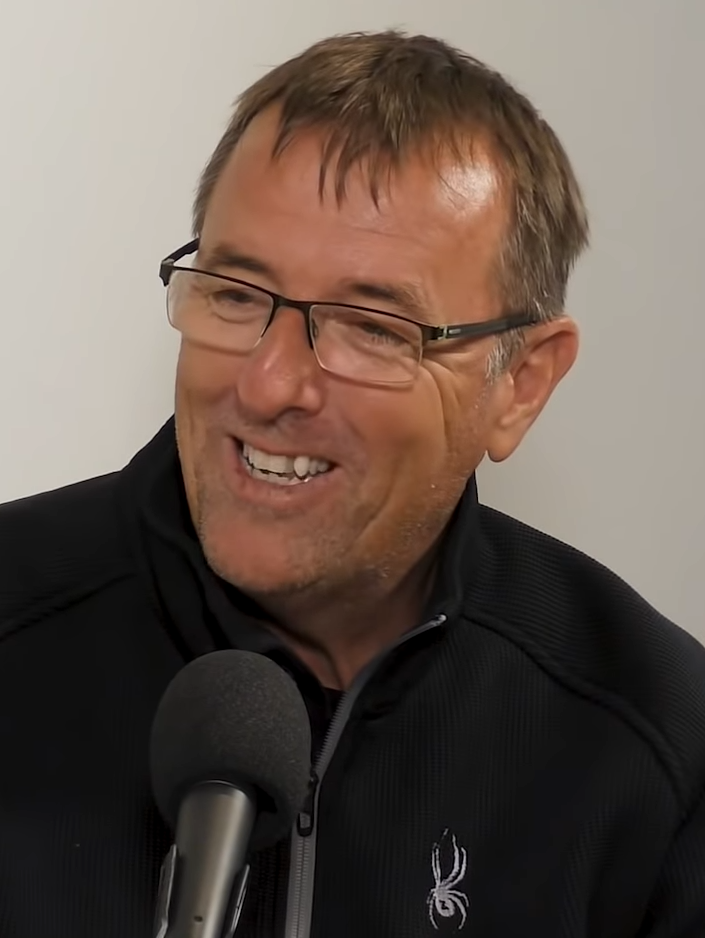
1989–90 was the first season in which Matt Le Tissier finished as Southampton's top scorer.

Southampton had a mixed start to their 1989–90 league campaign, picking up two wins, two draws and two defeats in their opening six games. The season started with a 1–2 home defeat to Millwall, who scored the winning goal in the penultimate minute; this was followed by a 2–1 away win over recently promoted Manchester City in which Danny Wallace scored both goals. A 0–3 thrashing at the hands of Everton was followed by a narrow 2–1 win over Aston Villa, after which the Saints shared eight goals with Norwich City at Carrow Road, in a match described by club historians as "remarkable". The 4–4 draw was Danny Wallace's last game for Southampton before his record transfer to Manchester United; he assisted one of brother Rod Wallace's two goals in the game. After two more draws and a 1–0 win over Derby County, Southampton sat eighth in the First Division table.

Mid-October saw the Saints pick up two 4–1 wins in a row and move all the way up to third in the league. The first was an away victory over Queens Park Rangers, which saw the Hampshire side pick up two goals in the last three minutes after the London-based hosts threatened a late comeback. The second was a home win over Liverpool, who sat atop the table before the game, unbeaten to that point in the league; Paul Rideout and a brace from Rod Wallace put the Saints 3–0 up within an hour, before a Peter Beardsley penalty was followed by a late Matt Le Tissier header to give Southampton their first league win over the Reds in three years. Despite these strong displays, it would be another month before the club won again, as they picked up two draws (against Tottenham Hotspur and Chelsea) and two marginal defeats (at Manchester United and Coventry City).

Southampton's last game in November saw them score six goals in a league fixture for the first time since April 1984, as they beat Luton Town (who had thrashed the Saints 6–1 the previous season and 7–0 in 1985–86) 6–3 at The Dell. Rideout opened the scoring in the second minute and Le Tissier scored the hosts' second just before half-time, although the visitors responded to both goals in kind. After the break, however, Rod Wallace added two, Alan Shearer added another, and Rideout doubled his tally, to send the Saints back up to fifth in the table. December saw the club pick up narrow wins over strugglers Manchester City and defending champions Arsenal, while dropping points against Nottingham Forest and eventual relegatees Millwall and Sheffield Wednesday. Come the end of 1989, the Saints sat fourth in the First Division table.

1990 started with similarly mixed fortunes for Southampton. After a 4–2 away win over Charlton Athletic on New Year's Day, the club held title challengers Everton to a 2–2 draw, before dropping all three points in a 1–2 defeat at Aston Villa, who picked up their tenth home win in a row with the result. In February, a defeat at Crystal Palace and a draw at Luton Town were followed by a third 4–1 win of the season, this time over mid-table side Norwich City, in which Le Tissier scored his first hat-trick of the season. He would score his second hat-trick just three weeks later in a 3–3 draw with Wimbledon, overcoming a 1–3 deficit and the dismissal of Francis Benali to salvage a point. The club's worst spell of the season followed, as the Saints lost three in a row including two at home – the first defeat saw the struggling Manchester United win 2–0 at The Dell; the second saw Southampton sacrifice a 2–1 lead at Anfield to lose 2–3 to eventual title winners Liverpool; and the third saw the club drop all three points to Queens Park Rangers.

Now sitting 12th in the league table – their worst position since the third game of the season – Southampton went on a four-game winning streak, their best of the campaign. First was a first away win since 1 January, a 1–0 victory over strugglers Sheffield Wednesday; second was a 3–2 home win over Charlton Athletic, in which all three of the hosts' goals (including two for Neil Ruddock) were scored in the first half; third was a 2–0 victory at home over Nottingham Forest, in which Rod Wallace scored his final two goals of the season (for a total of 18 in the league); and the fourth was a 3–0 win, again at home, over Coventry City. The winning run put Southampton back up to 7th in the table, where they would finish the season. The final two games of the campaign ended in defeat, as the Hampshire side lost 1–2 to two top-four sides: Arsenal and Tottenham Hotspur. The 7th-place finish was the best the club achieved under Chris Nicholl, and saw them score 19 more goals than the previous season.

=== List of match results ===
19 August 1989 1	Southampton	1–2	Millwall	Southampton
	Ruddock 71'	Report	Briley 38'; Sheringham 89'	Stadium: The Dell; Attendance: 14,201

23 August 1989 2	Manchester City	1–2	Southampton	Manchester
	Gleghorn 48'	Report	D. Wallace 38', 57'	Stadium: Maine Road; Attendance: 25,416

26 August 1989 3	Everton	3–0	Southampton	Liverpool
	Whiteside 5'; Newell 36'; McCall 46'	Report		Stadium: Goodison Park; Attendance: 27,807

29 August 1989 4	Southampton	2–1	Aston Villa	Southampton
	Cockerill 59'; Case 72'	Report	Platt 85'	Stadium: The Dell; Attendance: 14,401

9 September 1989 5	Norwich City	4–4	Southampton	Norwich
	Rosario 27', 77', 83'; Sherwood 48'	Report	Rideout 6', 50'; Rod Wallace 38', 47'	Stadium: Carrow Road; Attendance: 14,259

16 September 1989 6	Southampton	1–1	Crystal Palace	Southampton
	Horne 42'	Report	Hopkins 72'	Stadium: The Dell; Attendance: 15,368

23 September 1989 7	Derby County	0–1	Southampton	Derby
		Report	Rod Wallace 67'	Stadium: Baseball Ground; Attendance: 13,694

30 September 1989 8	Southampton	2–2	Wimbledon	Southampton
	Le Tissier 53', 75' (pen.)	Report	Young 24'; Wise 73'	Stadium: The Dell; Attendance: 12,904

14 October 1989 9	Queens Park Rangers	1–4	Southampton	London
	Francis 81'	Report	R. Wallace 32', 89'; Le Tissier 66' (pen.); Shearer 87'	Stadium: Loftus Road; Attendance: 10,022

21 October 1989 10	Southampton	4–1	Liverpool	Southampton
	Rideout 24'; R. Wallace 39', 56'; Le Tissier 85'	Report	Beardsley 59'	Stadium: The Dell; Attendance: 20,501

28 October 1989 11	Manchester United	2–1	Southampton	Manchester
	McClair 16', 61'	Report	Le Tissier 17'	Stadium: Old Trafford; Attendance: 37,122

4 November 1989 12	Southampton	1–1	Tottenham Hotspur	Southampton
	Cockerill 60'	Report	Gascoigne 44'	Stadium: The Dell; Attendance: 19,601

11 November 1989 13	Coventry City	1–0	Southampton	Coventry
	Drinkell 75'	Report		Stadium: Highfield Road; Attendance: 12,151

18 November 1989 14	Chelsea	2–2	Southampton	London
	Monkou 74'; Wilson 75'	Report	Le Tissier 44' (pen.), 66'	Stadium: Stamford Bridge; Attendance: 23,093

25 November 1989 15	Southampton	6–3	Luton Town	Southampton
	Rideout 2', 84'; Le Tissier 41'; Rod Wallace 53', 71'; Shearer 73'	Report	Dreyer 24'; Black 46'; Elstrup 75'	Stadium: The Dell; Attendance: 14,014

2 December 1989 16	Millwall	2–2	Southampton	London
	Cascarino 24'; Stephenson 70'	Report	Rideout 16'; Le Tissier 88' (pen.)	Stadium: The Den; Attendance: 10,470

9 December 1989 17	Southampton	2–1	Manchester City	Southampton
	Rod Wallace 75'; Horne 80'	Report	Allen 11'	Stadium: The Dell; Attendance: 15,832

17 December 1989 18	Nottingham Forest	2–0	Southampton	Nottingham
	Hodge 2'; Chapman 71'	Report		Stadium: City Ground; Attendance: 16,437

26 December 1989 19	Southampton	1–0	Arsenal	Southampton
	Rod Wallace 82'	Report		Stadium: The Dell; Attendance: 20,229

30 December 1989 20	Southampton	2–2	Sheffield Wednesday	Southampton
	Le Tissier 44' (pen.), 59'	Report	Atkinson 33'; Shirtliff 64'	Stadium: The Dell; Attendance: 16,417

1 January 1990 21	Charlton Athletic	2–4	Southampton	London
	Lee 24'; MacKenzie 90'	Report	Le Tissier 30'; Osman 32'; Rod Wallace 37', 70'	Stadium: Selhurst Park; Attendance: 7,614

13 January 1990 22	Southampton	2–2	Everton	Southampton
	Osman 14', 74'	Report	Whiteside 44', 46'	Stadium: The Dell; Attendance: 19,381

20 January 1990 23	Aston Villa	2–1	Southampton	Birmingham
	Daley 39'; Gage 79'	Report	Cockerill 54'	Stadium: Villa Park; Attendance: 33,118

10 February 1990 24	Crystal Palace	3–1	Southampton	London
	Salako 12'; Gray 51'; Barber 57'	Report	Osman 58'	Stadium: Selhurst Park; Attendance: 13,363

24 February 1990 25	Luton Town	1–1	Southampton	Luton
	Dowie 3'	Report	Shearer 45'	Stadium: Kenilworth Road; Attendance: 9,417

27 February 1990 26	Southampton	4–1	Norwich City	Southampton
	Le Tissier 55', 60', 86'; Moore 82'	Report	Allen 18'	Stadium: The Dell; Attendance: 13,668

3 March 1990 27	Southampton	2–3	Chelsea	Southampton
	Rod Wallace 18', 29'	Report	K. Wilson 34'; Dorigo 81'; Durie 82'	Stadium: The Dell; Attendance: 16,526

10 March 1990 28	Southampton	2–1	Derby County	Southampton
	Rod Wallace 47'; Le Tissier 50'	Report	Saunders 80'	Stadium: The Dell; Attendance: 16,430

17 March 1990 29	Wimbledon	3–3	Southampton	London
	Young 28'; Scales 37'; Fashanu 53'	Report	Le Tissier 19', 63', 67' (pen.)	Stadium: Plough Lane; Attendance: 5,382

24 March 1990 30	Southampton	0–2	Manchester United	Southampton
		Report	Gibson 65'; Robins 88'	Stadium: The Dell; Attendance: 20,510

31 March 1990 31	Liverpool	3–2	Southampton	Liverpool
	Barnes 15'; Moore 72' (o.g.); Rush 82'	Report	Rideout 35'; Case 48'	Stadium: Anfield; Attendance: 37,027

3 April 1990 32	Southampton	0–2	Queens Park Rangers	Southampton
		Report	Maddix 75'; Wegerle 85'	Stadium: The Dell; Attendance: 14,757

7 April 1990 33	Sheffield Wednesday	0–1	Southampton	Sheffield
		Report	Cockerill 70'	Stadium: Hillsborough; Attendance: 18,329

14 April 1990 34	Southampton	3–2	Charlton Athletic	Southampton
	Ruddock 23', 35'; Case 36'	Report	Jones 52'; Caton 64'	Stadium: The Dell; Attendance: 14,725

21 April 1990 35	Southampton	2–0	Nottingham Forest	Southampton
	Rod Wallace 4', 60'	Report		Stadium: The Dell; Attendance: 17,006

28 April 1990 36	Southampton	3–0	Coventry City	Southampton
	Le Tissier 36' (pen.); Horne 43'; Osman 85'	Report		Stadium: The Dell; Attendance: 16,359

2 May 1990 37	Arsenal	2–1	Southampton	London
	Dixon 76' (pen.); Rocastle 80'	Report	Horne 47'	Stadium: Highbury; Attendance: 23,732

5 May 1990 38	Tottenham Hotspur	2–1	Southampton	London
	Stewart 21'; Allen 35'	Report	Cook 89'	Stadium: White Hart Lane; Attendance: 31,038

=== Final league table ===
Pos	Team	Pld	W	D	L	GF	GA	GD	Pts
5	Chelsea	38	16	12	10	58	50	+8	60
6	Everton	38	17	8	13	57	46	+11	59
7	Southampton	38	15	10	13	71	63	+8	55
8	Wimbledon	38	13	16	9	47	40	+7	55
9	Nottingham Forest	38	15	9	14	55	47	+8	54

Source: RSSSF
Rules for classification: 1) Points; 2) Goal difference; 3) Goals scored

=== Results by matchday ===
Round	1	2	3	4	5	6	7	8	9	10	11	12	13	14	15	16	17	18	19	20	21	22	23	24	25	26	27	28	29	30	31	32	33	34	35	36	37	38
Ground	H	A	A	H	A	H	A	H	A	H	A	H	A	A	H	A	H	A	H	H	A	H	A	A	A	H	H	H	A	H	A	H	A	H	H	H	A	A
Result	L	W	L	W	D	D	W	D	W	W	L	D	L	D	W	D	W	L	W	D	W	D	L	L	D	W	L	W	D	L	L	L	W	W	W	W	L	L
Position	14	8	15	6	9	10	8	8	6	3	5	5	8	8	5	7	5	6	6	4	4	4	5	8	10	5	6	7	7	9	11	12	10	7	7	7	7	7

Source: 11v11.com
A = Away; H = Home; W = Win; D = Draw; L = Loss

== FA Cup ==
Southampton entered the 1989–90 FA Cup in the third round against First Division rivals Tottenham Hotspur, with both clubs in the top five of the league table. Despite the tie taking place at White Hart Lane, the visiting Saints dominated most of the first half, breaking the deadlock just before the half-hour mark through Matt Le Tissier, who converted a setup from Jimmy Case. Just before the break, Barry Horne doubled Southampton's lead when he "effortlessly" scored a setup from Le Tissier. Tottenham increased the pressure after the break and finally scored in the 78th minute, thanks to a "thunderous" shot from outside the box by David Howells. However, despite pushing for an equaliser, it was the Saints who would score the final goal of the match, when Rod Wallace scored in injury time.

In the fourth round, Southampton hosted Second Division side Oxford United. Despite the difference in divisions, the visitors almost went ahead on multiple occasions in the first half, with the "below par" Saints saved only by goalkeeper Tim Flowers and his defenders. After the break, Le Tissier set up Neil Ruddock from a corner for a headed goal to put the top-flight side ahead; this proved to be the only goal of the game, as the Saints were unable to assert their dominance. The fifth round of the tournament saw Southampton drawn away to Liverpool, the defending FA Cup champions and current First Division leaders, whose only loss of the season had come at the hands of the Saints. Playing without top scorer Le Tissier, the visitors struggled throughout the opening half of the game, eventually conceding five minutes before the break to Ian Rush. The second half saw the hosts continue to take advantage of their chances on goal, with a Peter Beardsley chip just after the hour mark doubling their lead, before Steve Nicol would complete the 3–0 win later on.

6 January 1990 Round 3	Tottenham Hotspur	1–3	Southampton	London
	Howells 78'		Le Tissier 29'; Horne 42'; Rod Wallace 90'	Stadium: White Hart Lane; Attendance: 33,134

27 January 1990 Round 4	Southampton	1–0	Oxford United	Southampton
	Ruddock 59'			Stadium: The Dell; Attendance: 19,802

17 February 1990 Round 5	Liverpool	3–0	Southampton	Liverpool
	Rush 40'; Beardsley 62'; Nicol 78'			Stadium: Anfield; Attendance: 35,961

== League Cup ==
Southampton entered the 1989–90 League Cup in the second round against Fourth Division side York City. The Saints won the first leg by a single Rod Wallace goal just two minutes before full-time, before securing a 3–0 aggregate win in the return leg at The Dell thanks to a brace from Alan Shearer (his first goals for the club since his April 1988 full league debut). In the third round, Southampton edged out First Division strugglers Charlton Athletic by a single goal, scored by Glenn Cockerill just after the half-time break. In the fourth round, a goalless draw at Second Division side Swindon Town made way for a replay at The Dell which the Saints won 4–2 after extra time, thanks to winning goals from Matt Le Tissier and Rod Wallace. The fifth round saw Southampton host another Second Division side, Oldham Athletic, who held the top-flight home side to a 2–2 draw thanks to a goal in injury time which forced a replay. Oldham won the replay 2–0, with club historians reflecting that the "Saints created virtually nothing against a well-organised Oldham side".

20 September 1989 Round 2 Leg 1	York City	0–1	Southampton	York
			Rod Wallace 88'	Stadium: Bootham Crescent; Attendance: 4,526

3 October 1989 Round 2 Leg 2	Southampton	2–0 (3–0 agg.)	York City	Southampton
	Shearer 10', 76'			Stadium: The Dell; Attendance: 8,096

24 October 1989 Round 3	Southampton	1–0	Charlton Athletic	Southampton
	Cockerill 46'			Stadium: The Dell; Attendance: 13,590

29 November 1989 Round 4	Swindon Town	0–0	Southampton	Swindon
				Stadium: County Ground; Attendance: 15,085

16 January 1990 Round 4 Replay	Southampton	4–2 (a.e.t.)	Swindon Town	Southampton
	Horne 47'; Rideout 84'; Le Tissier 91'; Rod Wallace 113'		McLoughlin 33'; White 36'	Stadium: The Dell; Attendance: 19,018

24 January 1990 Round 5	Southampton	2–2	Oldham Athletic	Southampton
	Le Tissier 6', 84' (pen.)		Ritchie 81', 90+3'	Stadium: The Dell; Attendance: 21,026

31 January 1990 Round 5 Replay	Oldham Athletic	2–0	Southampton	Oldham
	Ritchie 9'; Milligan 50'			Stadium: Boundary Park; Attendance: 18,862

== Other matches ==
Southampton played three additional matches during the latter stages of the 1989–90 season. In April, they beat Southern League side Salisbury 9–0 in a testimonial for Barry Cramner, with eight different players on the scoresheet. This was followed in May by an 8–1 thrashing of Sussex County League side Pagham (in which Alan Shearer scored five) and a 10–0 victory over Isthmian League side Hungerford Town in which Shearer and Matt Le Tissier each scored hat-tricks.

17 April 1990 Barry Cramner Testimonial	Salisbury	0–9	Southampton	Salisbury
			Banger; Cockerill; Le Tissier; Rideout; Rowland; Ruddock; Shearer; Rod Wallace

10 May 1990 Friendly	Pagham	1–8	Southampton	Pagham
			Shearer; Rideout; Cockerill	Stadium: Nyetimber Lane

15 May 1990 Chard Testimonial	Hungerford Town	0–10	Southampton	Hungerford
			Le Tissier; Shearer; Banger; Rideout; Rowland	Stadium: Bulpit Lane

== Player details ==
Southampton used 23 players during the 1989–90 season, 11 of whom scored during the campaign. Five players made their debut appearances for the club, including three of their four new signings (Ian Andrews, Oleksiy Cherednyk, and Sammy Lee) and two players making the step up from youth to the first team (Steve Davis and Jason Dodd). Five players made their final appearances for the Saints during the campaign: Lee, Graham Baker, Gerry Forrest, Ray Wallace, Danny Wallace. Striker Rod Wallace made the most appearances for Southampton during 1989–90, missing only one game in the League Cup; while Matt Le Tissier scored the most goals during the campaign, with 20 in the league, one in the FA Cup, and three in the League Cup. Midfielder Glenn Cockerill had the second most appearances of the season with 45, while Rod Wallace was the second-highest scorer with 21 goals across all competitions. Le Tissier won the Southampton F.C. Player of the Season award for the 1989–90 season.

=== Squad statistics ===
Name	Pos.	Nat.	League		FA Cup		League Cup		Total	
Name	Pos.	Nat.	Apps.	Goals	Apps.	Goals	Apps.	Goals	Apps.	Goals
Micky Adams	DF	(England)	15	0	0	0	1	0	16	0
Ian Andrews	GK	(England)	3	0	0	0	0	0	3	0
Graham Baker	MF	(England)	2(1)	0	0	0	0	0	2(1)	0
Nicky Banger	FW	(England)	0	0	0	0	0	0	0	0
Francis Benali	DF	(England)	23(4)	0	3	0	5	0	31(4)	0
Jimmy Case	MF	(England)	33	3	3	0	6	0	42	0
Oleksiy Cherednyk	DF	(Soviet Union)	7(1)	0	0	0	0	0	7(1)	0
Glenn Cockerill	MF	(England)	35(1)	4	3	0	6	1	44(1)	5
Andy Cook	DF	(England)	2(2)	1	0	0	0	0	2(2)	1
Steve Davis	DF	(England)	4	0	0	0	0	0	4	0
Jason Dodd	DF	(England)	21(1)	0	2	0	4(1)	0	27(2)	0
Tim Flowers	GK	(England)	35	0	3	0	6	0	44	0
Gerry Forrest	DF	(England)	1	0	0	0	0	0	1	0
Barry Horne	MF	(Wales)	28(1)	4	3	1	3(1)	1	34(2)	6
Jeff Kenna	DF	(Republic of Ireland)	0	0	0	0	0	0	0	0
Matt Le Tissier	MF	(England)	35	20	2	1	5(1)	3	42(1)	24
Sammy Lee	MF	(England)	0(2)	0	0(1)	0	0	0	0(3)	0
Lee Luscombe	FW	(Guernsey)	0	0	0	0	0	0	0	0
Neil Maddison	MF	(England)	0(2)	0	0(1)	0	0	0	0(3)	0
Kevin Moore	DF	(England)	18(3)	1	2	0	2(1)	0	22(4)	1
Russell Osman	DF	(England)	34(1)	5	3	0	6	0	43(1)	5
Dean Radford	DF	(England)	0	0	0	0	0	0	0	0
Paul Rideout	FW	(England)	30(1)	7	3	0	6	1	39(1)	8
Andy Rowland	FW	(England)	0	0	0	0	0	0	0	0
Neil Ruddock	DF	(England)	25(4)	3	1	1	4(1)	0	30(5)	4
Alan Shearer	FW	(England)	19(7)	3	1(2)	0	4(1)	2	24(10)	5
Ray Wallace	DF	(England)	8(1)	0	1	0	2	0	11(1)	0
Rod Wallace	FW	(England)	35(3)	18	3	1	6	2	44(3)	21
J. Webb	MF	(England)	0	0	0	0	0	0	0	0
Players with appearances who left before the end of the season
Danny Wallace	FW	(England)	5	2	0	0	0	0	5	2

=== Most appearances ===
Rank	Name	Pos.	League		FA Cup		League Cup		Total		
Rank	Name	Pos.	Starts	Subs	Starts	Subs	Starts	Subs	Starts	Subs	Total
1	Rod Wallace	FW	35	3	3	0	6	0	44	3	47
2	Glenn Cockerill	MF	35	1	3	0	6	0	44	1	45
3	Tim Flowers	GK	35	0	3	0	6	0	44	0	44
3	Russell Osman	DF	34	1	3	0	6	1	43	1	44
5	Matt Le Tissier	MF	35	0	2	0	5	1	42	1	43
6	Jimmy Case	MF	33	0	3	0	6	0	42	0	42
7	Paul Rideout	FW	30	1	3	0	6	1	39	1	40
8	Barry Horne	MF	28	1	3	0	3	1	34	2	36
9	Francis Benali	DF	23	4	3	0	5	0	31	4	35
9	Neil Ruddock	DF	25	4	1	0	4	1	30	5	35

=== Top goalscorers ===
Rank	Name	Pos.	League		FA Cup		League Cup		Total		
Rank	Name	Pos.	Goals	Apps	Goals	Apps	Goals	Apps	Goals	Apps	GPG
1	Matt Le Tissier	MF	20	35	1	2	3	6	24	43	0.56
2	Rod Wallace	FW	18	38	1	3	2	6	21	47	0.45
3	Paul Rideout	FW	7	31	0	3	1	6	8	40	0.20
4	Barry Horne	MF	4	29	1	3	1	4	6	36	0.17
5	Alan Shearer	FW	3	26	0	3	2	6	5	34	0.15
5	Russell Osman	DF	5	35	0	3	0	6	5	44	0.11
5	Glenn Cockerill	MF	4	36	0	3	1	6	5	45	0.11
8	Neil Ruddock	DF	3	29	1	1	0	5	4	35	0.11
9	Jimmy Case	MF	3	33	0	3	0	6	3	42	0.07
10	Danny Wallace	FW	2	5	0	0	0	0	2	5	0.40

== Bibliography ==
- Holley, Duncan; Chalk, Gary (2003), Bull, David (ed.), In That Number: A Post-War Chronicle of Southampton FC, Bristol, England: Hagiology Publishing, ISBN 0-9534474-3-X
