= Sean Joyce (footballer) =

English footballer and manager

Personal information
- Full name: Sean William Joyce
- Date of birth: 15 February 1967 (age 59)
- Place of birth: Conisbrough, Yorkshire, England
- Height: 5 ft 8 in (1.73 m)
- Position: Midfielder

Team information
- Current team: Bideford (manager)

Senior career*
Years	Team	Apps	(Gls)
1986–1988	Doncaster Rovers	41	(2)
1986	→ Exeter City (loan)	1	(0)
1988–1993	Torquay United	158	(15)
- Elmore
????–1996	Taunton Town		
1996-1998	Bideford		

Managerial career
- 1998–: Bideford
- * Club domestic league appearances and goals

Sean William Joyce (born 15 February 1967 in Conisbrough, Yorkshire) is a British former professional footballer who made 200 appearances in the Football League playing for Doncaster Rovers, Exeter City and Torquay United. Since 1998 he has been manager of Devon non-league side Bideford of the Southern Football League

Sean Joyce began his career as an apprentice with Doncaster Rovers, making his debut prior to turning professional in September 1986. In November 1986 he joined Exeter City on loan to gain additional experience and returned to Doncaster, going on to make 41 appearances and score twice.

He moved to Torquay United on a free transfer in August 1988, playing at Wembley Stadium in the Football League Trophy Final against Bolton Wanderers, and again at Wembley in the 1991 play-off final victory on penalties against Blackpool. He remained with the Gulls after their relegation the following season before leaving league football, joining Elmore, having made 158 league appearances, scoring 15 goals, for the Gulls.

He later played for Taunton Town, but was released by Taunton in April 1996 and joined Bideford, then managed by former Torquay teammate Dean Edwards. In September 1998 he stepped up from club captain when he was appointed player-manager, though a knee injury soon made his role that of only being the manager, and he guided Bideford away from the danger of relegation. He made Bideford one of the top teams in the Western League and a serious challenger to Taunton Town's dominance of the competition since Tiverton Town's promotion.

Subsequently, Bideford have been promoted to the Evo-Stik Southern League Premier, where the team are beginning to establish themselves.

== Honours ==
Torquay United

- Football League Fourth Division play-offs: 1991
- Associate Members' Cup runner-up: 1988–89
