= Albert Holmes (footballer, born 1942) =

English footballer

Personal information
- Full name: Albert Valentine Holmes
- Date of birth: 14 February 1942 (age 84)
- Place of birth: Ecclesfield, England
- Position: Full-back

Senior career*
Years	Team	Apps	(Gls)
1960–1976	Chesterfield.	470	(10)
1976–19??	Boston United		
- * Club domestic league appearances and goals

Albert Holmes (born 14 February 1942) is an English footballer who played as a full-back in the Football League with Chesterfield between 1961–62 and 1975–76.

He was a fitter with the East Midlands Gas Board, and played football for them before signing semi-pro for Chesterfield in 1960, and became a full professional the following year. He went on to make a total of 514 senior appearances for the club (scoring 10 goals). Of these, 470 were League appearances, putting him, as of May 2014, in fourth position on the all-time league appearance list for Chesterfield.

After leaving Chesterfield he moved to Boston United. His son Paul was also a professional footballer.
