= Pelsall Villa F.C. =

Association football club in England

Coordinates: 52°37′16.64″N 1°57′58.27″W

Pelsall Villa
- Full name: Pelsall Villa Football Club
- Nickname(s): The Villains
- Founded: 1897; 128 years ago
- Ground: Oak Park, Walsall Wood
Home colours	Away colours

Pelsall Villa F.C. was a football club based in the village of Pelsall, near Walsall, West Midlands, England. The team kit consisted of black and red striped shirts, black shorts and black socks.

== History ==
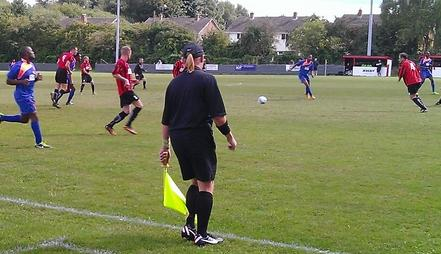
Pelsall Villa in action against Barnt Green Spartak in 2013

Records from the Walsall Observer newspaper show that football was played in Pelsall as long ago as 1898. The two World Wars caused a temporary halt to proceedings, but in 1961 the club reformed and this heralded the beginning of Pelsall Villa as it is known today. Using changing facilities in the nearby Red Cow public house was never a satisfactory situation and in 1978 a liaison was formed by then chairman, Vic Dolphin with Pelsall Cricket & Sports Club. As a result of the link-up, Villa not only gained improved dressing rooms, but also real headquarters.

In 1982 the club left the Staffordshire County League having been accepted into the West Midlands (Regional) League Division Two. Promotion was secured after two seasons at that level, but it was obvious that a number of improvements were needed at The Bush ground to bring it up to the required standard for an assault on the Premier Division.

During the summer of 1991 floodlights were installed and Aston Villa provided the opposition as they were officially switched on in front of a crowd of 2,000 in November 1991. Manager Reg Priest set about the task of strengthening the playing squad and success soon followed in both the FA Cup and FA Vase competitions. In fact, Villa were within three games of making it to Wembley Stadium in the FA Vase in 1992–93 before narrowly losing out to an extra-time own goal at the hands of Buckingham Town. The next stage of the club's ongoing development saw hard-standing laid all around the perimeter and a 500-seater stand erected at The Bush end of the ground.

The aim was to secure a place in the newly formed Midland Alliance, but, having taken the West Midlands (Regional) League Premier Division title in 1994–95, the eagerly-awaited promotion was not granted. It did arrive at the end of the following season, however, following a second-placed berth during a campaign that also saw the League Cup and Midland Invitation Cup secured. The first season at the higher level ended with a mid-table finish as captain Adrian Horne won the Alliance Player of the Year. A position in the middle of the table was the norm for the next few years as the club consolidated.

1998–99 saw chairman Vic Dolphin and club stalwart Tony Gough resign after more than two decades of service. Ron New took over the chair in 1999–2000 before relegation followed in 2003–04 as the club returned to the West Midlands (Regional) League. In January 2004, former Wolverhampton Wanderers player Dean Edwards was appointed as player-manager but was unable to prevent the club's relegation and left at the end of the season.

There was another change of personnel at the helm when former player Shaun Mason returned to the club, initially as first-team manager then chairman as Mark Bentley took over the reins. For the 2009–10 season, the club was transferred into the Midland Combination, which subsequently merged with the Midland Alliance to form the Midland League. In November 2014, former professional goalkeeper Scott Cooksey was appointed joint manager alongside Barry Dedman. At the end of the 2017–18 season, the club was expelled from the Midland League after failing to fulfill a number of fixtures. From the 2018–19 season onwards the club has not fielded a side in Saturday football and effectively no longer exists. The Bush Ground is now disused and has been earmarked as a potential site for a supermarket. An unrelated team called Pelsall Villa Colts now compete in the Staffordshire County Senior League.

== Managers ==
- (England) Stephen Cooke 2016–?
- (England) Scott Cooksey 2014–2015
- (England) Barry Dedman 2014–
- (England) Dave Dowling 2014
- (England) Mark Bentley 2004–2014
- (England) Shaun Mason 2004–2005
- (England) Steve Hicks 2002–2004
- (England) Kevin Gough 1999–2002
- (England) Reg Priest 1991–1999
- (England) S.Hart 1987–1991
- (England) B.Hill 1984–1987

== Honours ==
- Staffordshire County League
  - Runners-up: 1968–69
- West Midlands (Regional) League
  - Premier Division
    - Champions: 1994–95,
    - Runners-up: 1995–96
  - Division One
    - Runners-up: 1989–90
  - Division Two
    - Runners-up: 1983–84
  - Premier Division Cup
    - Winners: 1995–96
  - Division One Cup
    - Winners: 1988–89
    - Runners-up: 1989–90
  - Division Two Cup
    - Runners-up: 1983–84
- Sporting Star Cup
  - Champions: 1976–77
  - Runners-up: 1961–62,
- Cannock Charity Cup
  - Champions: 1963–64,
- Wednesbury Charity Cup
  - Champions: 1967–68, 1968–69, 1972–73, 1973–74, 1988–89, 1989–90
  - Runners-up: 1966–67, 1969–70, 1970–71, 1987–88, 1990–91, 1992–93, 1993–94
- Rugeley Charity Cup
  - Winners: 1969–70, 1978–79
- D. Stanton Shield
  - Winners: 1973–74
  - Runners-up: 1975–76
- Bloxwich Charity Cup
  - Winners: 1981–82, 1982–83
- Edge Cup
  - Winners: 1983–84
- Walsall Challenge Cup
  - Runners-up: 1989–90
- Ike Cooper Trophy
  - Runners-up: 1989–90
- Walsall Senior Cup
  - Runners-up: 1992–93
- Midland Triangular Invitation Cup
  - Winners: 1995–96
- Staffordshire FA Challenge Vase
  - Runners-up: 2006–07

=== Youth honours ===
- Midland Floodlit Youth League
  - Northern Division champions: 2009–10
- Staffordshire FA Floodlit Youth County Cup
  - Runners Up: 2009–10
- Staffordshire Junior Cup
  - Champions: 1968–69

== Club records ==
- Best league position: 14th in Midland Alliance, 1997–98
- Best FA Cup performance: 3rd round qualifying, 1992–93
- Best FA Vase performance: 5th round, 1992–93

== Ground ==
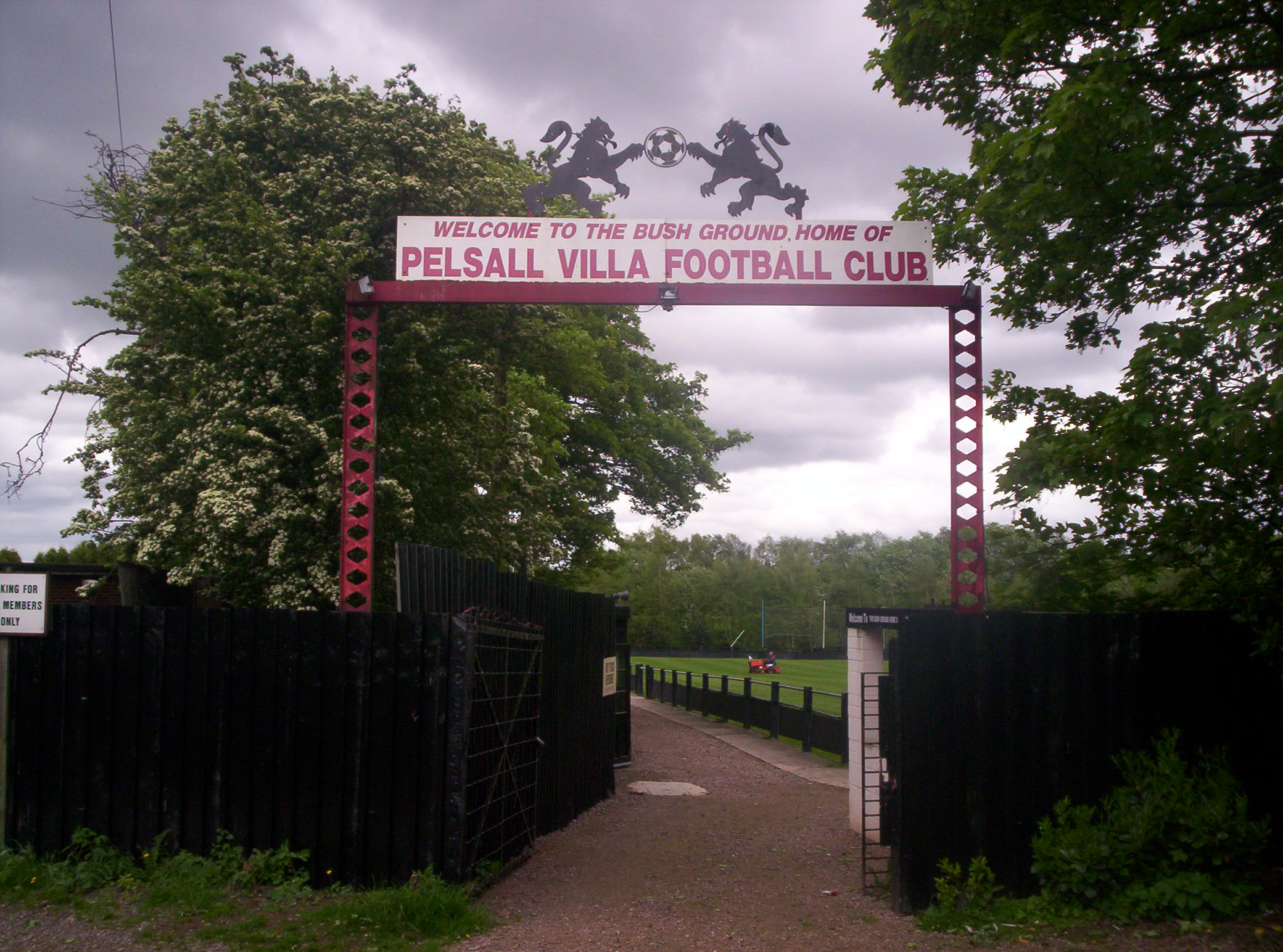
The Bush Ground, former home of Pelsall Villa

The club's long-standing home, the Bush Ground, takes its name from the Old Bush pub which is next to it. It has a stand behind one goal which came from the ground of the defunct Telford-based club GKN Sankey, and seats which came from Molineux, home of Wolverhampton Wanderers, as well as unusually-shaped concrete dugouts. In 2017, however, the club began a groundshare with Walsall Wood following vandalism at the Bush Ground.
