= Scott Cooksey =

English footballer (born 1972)

Personal information
- Full name: Scott Andrew Cooksey
- Date of birth: 24 June 1972 (age 54)
- Place of birth: Birmingham, England
- Height: 1.93 m (6 ft 4 in)
- Position: Goalkeeper

Senior career*
Years	Team	Apps	(Gls)
1988–1991	Derby County	0	(0)
1991	Shrewsbury Town	0	(0)
1991–1993	Bromsgrove Rovers	134	(0)
1993–1995	Peterborough United	20	(0)
1994	→ Stalybridge Celtic (loan)	13	(0)
1995	→ Welling United (loan)	5	(0)
1995–1998	Hednesford Town	178	(0)
1998–2000	Shrewsbury Town	3	(0)
1999	→ Weymouth (loan)	10	(0)
2000	→ Hereford United (loan)	17	(0)
2000–2002	Hereford United	53	(0)
Total		453	(0)

International career
1997–2001	England C	4	(0)

Managerial career
- 2014 – 2016: Pelsall Villa
- * Club domestic league appearances and goals

Scott Andrew Cooksey (born 24 June 1972 in Birmingham) is an English former professional footballer who played as a goalkeeper. During his career he played for several professional and semi-professional clubs, including Derby County, Shrewsbury Town, Peterborough United, Hednesford Town, and Hereford United. His career ended prematurely during the 2001–02 season after a wrist injury.

== Early career ==
Cooksey started his professional career at Derby County in 1988 where he spent two season, followed by a half season at Shrewsbury Town. He was unable to break into the first squad at either club. Cooksey then joined Bromsgrove Rovers and started to attract the attention of the professional rank officials with stints at West Ham and Sheffield United. Cooksey eventually moved to Peterborough United in 1993, however he was restricted from studying under Fred Barber and started 20 first-team games. During this period, Cooksey also had successful loan stints at non-league sides, Welling United and Stalybridge Celtic.

== Hednesford Town ==
In July 1995, Cooksey was signed to Hednesford, who had recently won a promotion to the Football Conference. Cooksey was able to establish himself as one of the team's star players, and Hednesford established itself as one of the country's top non-league sides during the mid-1990s. During his three and a half years at the club, Cooksey was the first-choice goalkeeper.

Cooksey was part of Hednesford's FA Cup run during the 1996–97 season, which saw Hednesford progress to the fourth round. Cooksey played an important role during the second round against Blackpool F.C., where a series of saves allowed Hednesford to hold onto a 1-0 lead to win the match.

After Hednesford's strong performance during the mid-1990s, several Football League clubs showed an interest in Cooksey. There was speculations of a transfer to a higher league during his last few months at Hednesford. He was also called to the England semi-professional side, making two appearances.

== Shrewsbury Town ==
In October 1998, Shrewsbury Town manager Jake King signed Cooksey from Hednesford for £15,000. Cooksey had been a squad member at Shrewsbury during part of the 1992–93 season.

Cooksey did not manage the same success with Shrewsbury Town as he did with Hednesford.. The club was entering a mediocre period of its history and struggled to remain in the Football League. Shrewsbury's first-choice goalkeeper Paul Edwards was a central team member, with Cooksey being second-choice. His first-team debut was against Cardiff City at Ninian Park, which ended with a 3–0 defeat for Shrewsbury. He was only to make one more league appearance, a 3–2 win against Hull City at Gay Meadow, and an appearance in the Associate Members Cup.

Late in 1999, Jake King was replaced by Kevin Ratcliffe as manager. Cooksey was replaced as second-choice goalkeeper by former Liverpool trainee Ian Dunbavin, leaving him to find a place elsewhere.

== Hereford United ==
In January 2000, Hereford United, then part of the Football Conference, signed Cooksey on loan from Shrewsbury. Cooksey was again first-choice, and was signed on a free transfer in the summer of 2000. He quickly established himself as a fan favourite for his passionate displays.

Cooksey was a first-team regular as Hereford pushed for promotion from the Football Conference. While they were not promoted during Cooksey's stay, he became well-regarded at the club, establishing himself as the first-choice goalkeeper. During this spell, Cooksey also became the first-choice goalkeeper in the England semi-professional squad, earning two more caps.

In late 2001, Cooksey injured his wrist. He received injections which allowed him to continue to compete, however his injury eventually became infected. Cooksey missed the entire 2001–02 season, and spent three weeks in the hospital with blood poisoning. These complications destroyed his wrist ligaments and left him severely weakened.

Cooksey went through rehabilitation and returned to football in January 2002 with a solitary appearance on the bench in the FA Trophy replay against Chesham United. He was unable to fully recover from the wrist injury, and with the need for further surgeries, he opted to retire from professional football in February 2002 at age 29.

== Coaching and management ==
After retiring from football, Cooksey started a career in education in his hometown of Birmingham. He has also been involved in junior football, and managed Cradley in the Alliance during the 2006–07 campaign. In November 2014, he was appointed joint manager alongside Barry Dedman of Midland League side Pelsall Villa. Cooksey took over the reins after saving Pelsall from relegation. During the 2015–16 campaign, Cooksey made the club more competitive but parted company in early February 2016 due to ill health. After recovering from illness Cooksey went on to become goalkeeping coach at Rushall Olympic, Boldmere St Michael’s, Darlaston Town and currently at Stafford Rangers
