= Micky Holmes =

English footballer (born 1965)

Personal information
- Full name: Michael Arthur Holmes
- Date of birth: 9 September 1965 (age 61)
- Place of birth: Bradford, England
- Height: 5 ft 8 in (1.73 m)
- Position: Midfielder

Team information
- Current team: Oadby Town (co-manager)

Youth career
- Ventus United & Yeadon Celtic

Senior career*
Years	Team	Apps	(Gls)
1984–1985	Bradford City	5	(0)
1985–1988	Wolverhampton Wanderers	83	(13)
1988	Huddersfield Town	7	(0)
1989	Cambridge United	11	(0)
1989–1990	Rochdale	55	(7)
1990–1991	Torquay United	40	(3)
1991–1993	Carlisle United	34	(4)
1993	Northampton Town	6	(0)
- Wisbech Town

Managerial career
- 2008–: Oadby Town
- * Club domestic league appearances and goals

Michael Arthur Holmes (born 9 September 1965) is an English professional footballer who played as a midfielder in the Football League for eight teams during the 1980s and 1990s.

== Career ==
Born in Bradford, Holmes began his professional career when he joined Bradford City his home town team on a non-contract basis, making his league debut during the 1984–85 season. After only a handful of appearances at Valley Parade, he moved on to Wolverhampton Wanderers in November 1985. He made his Wolves' debut on 30 November 1985 in a 1–1 draw at Cardiff City.

The midfielder became a regular player at Molineux, but could not halt relegation to the fourth tier. The 1986–87 season proved his best with the club as he played in a majority of the games, helping them to the play-offs. He scored eight times during the campaign – all coming in a nine-match hot streak. Several new signings in the close season meant Holmes' second season didn't offer as much playing time, but he still managed 30 appearances in all competitions as the club lifted the Fourth Division championship. He also played in every game in their success in the Football League Trophy.

He was released in summer 1988, whereupon he joined Huddersfield Town in a short-lived move. He ended the season with an equally swift stay at Cambridge United, before signing for Rochdale. His spell there saw the club reach the fifth round of the FA Cup for the first time in their history, but after making over 60 appearances, he moved on again, signing for Torquay United, then Carlisle United and Northampton Town, but his professional career was ended at the age of 29 by a back injury sustained in a car crash. He then moved into non-league football with Wisbech Town.

After spending several years in the pub trade, as a representative and running a pub-restaurant, Holmes and wife Bernadette run a sandwich shop in Leicester. He combines the role with coaching football at Leicester College, and is also co-manager, alongside former Leicester City player Matt Elliott, of Oadby Town in the Midland Alliance.

== Honours ==
Wolverhampton Wanderers

- Football League Fourth Division: 1987–88
- Associate Members' Cup: 1987–88

Torquay United

- Football League Fourth Division play-offs: 1991
