= Chris Myers (footballer) =

English footballer

Personal information
- Full name: Christopher Myers
- Date of birth: 1 April 1969 (age 57)
- Place of birth: Yeovil, England
- Height: 5 ft 10 in (1.78 m)
- Position: Midfielder

Youth career
- –1987: Torquay United

Senior career*
Years	Team	Apps	(Gls)
1986–1988	Torquay United	9	(0)
1988–1989	Dawlish Town		
1989–1990	Barnstaple Town		
1990–1993	Torquay United	96	(7)
1993–1996	Dundee United	6	(0)
1993–1994	→ Torquay United (loan)	6	(0)
1996	Wrexham	0	(0)
1996	Scarborough	9	(0)
1996–1997	Exeter City	35	(2)
1997–1998	Dorchester Town		
1998–2003	Taunton Town		
2003–2008	Dawlish Town		

Managerial career
- 2003–2008: Dawlish Town
- 2009: Burscough
- * Club domestic league appearances and goals

Christopher Myers (born 1 April 1969) is an English former professional footballer who played for clubs including Torquay United and Exeter City.

== Career ==
Myers began his career with Torquay United, making his debut in 1986 whilst still a trainee. He turned professional in June 1987, but was released after just nine league games. He played for Dawlish Town and then Barnstaple Town until August 1990, but was re-signed by Torquay United. His second spell at the club was more successful, and he was a member of Torquay's promotion winning side in 1991.

He was sold to Dundee United for a fee of £100,000 in August 1993, but struggled to establish himself at Tannadice and returned to Torquay on loan in December 1993. On leaving Dundee United in January 1996, Myers joined Wrexham, but left to join Scarborough later that month without appearing for Wrexham. In March 1996, Myers returned to the South-West of England, joining Exeter City. Myers was released by Exeter in May 1997 and, after an unsuccessful trial with Torquay United, returned to playing non-league football with Dorchester Town under manager Stuart Morgan who had given him his debut for Torquay eleven years earlier.

He signed for Taunton Town in July 1998 and helped Taunton to the Western League title in 2000. He missed most of the following season through injury, but returned to play for Taunton until October 2003 when he left by mutual consent after discovering he required a knee operation. Two weeks later he took over as player-manager of Dawlish Town where he remained until June 2008 when resigned in order to spend more time with his Southport-based family. The previous season had seen him lead Dawlish to 2nd place in the Western League, their highest ever league finishing position.

In April 2009, Myers was appointed manager of Burscough on a temporary basis, although his first game in charge saw his side's relegation confirmed.

== Personal life ==
Myers' father, Cliff was a professional footballer and in 2014, Myers' son Spencer signed a scholarship deal with Premier League side Everton. At one point outside of football, Myers ran a golf shop with former Torquay United teammate Ken Veysey. He has also worked as a firefighter for the Lancashire Fire and Rescue Service.

== Honours ==
Torquay United

- Football League Fourth Division play-offs: 1991
