= Mark Loram (footballer) =

English football defender

Personal information
- Full name: Mark Julian Loram
- Date of birth: 13 August 1967 (age 59)
- Place of birth: Paignton, England
- Height: 6 ft 0 in (1.83 m)
- Position: Midfielder

Senior career*
Years	Team	Apps	(Gls)
1982–1984	Brixham Villa		
1984–1986	Torquay United	52	(8)
1986–1987	Queens Park Rangers	0	(0)
1987–1992	Torquay United	209	(41)
1991–1992	→ Stockport County (loan)	4	(0)
1992–1993	→ Exeter City (loan)	3	(0)
1993	Yate Town		
1993	Minehead		
1994	Torquay United	1	(0)
1995	Elmore		
- * Club domestic league appearances and goals

Mark Julian Loram (born 13 August 1967) is an English former footballer who played for Torquay United on over 260 occasions. He was contracted to Queens Park Rangers without making a first team appearance, and had brief loan spells at Stockport County and Exeter City.

== Honours ==
Torquay United

- Football League Fourth Division play-offs: 1991
- Associate Members' Cup runner-up: 1988–89
