= Jack Edwards (footballer, born 1929) =

Welsh footballer and manager

Personal information
- Full name: William John Edwards
- Date of birth: 6 July 1929
- Place of birth: Risca, Wales
- Date of death: May 2014 (aged 84)
- Place of death: Plymouth, England
- Position: Full back

Youth career
- Cardiff City
- Lovells Athletic

Senior career*
Years	Team	Apps	(Gls)
1949–1959	Crystal Palace	223	(0)
1959–1961	Rochdale	68	(1)
1961–1962	Ashford Town	22	(0)

Managerial career
- 1963–1965: Exeter City
- 1971–1973: Torquay United
- * Club domestic league appearances and goals

William John Edwards (6 July 1929 – May 2014) was a Welsh professional football player and manager. In his playing career he was a full-back.

== Playing career ==
Edwards began his career as an amateur, initially with Cardiff City and then Lovells Athletic, from whom he joined Crystal Palace in June 1949. Over the next ten seasons Edwards was a regular in the Crystal Palace side and made 223 League appearances before moving to Rochdale in June 1959. After 68 appearances for Rochdale, Edwards moved into Non-League football with Ashford Town (Kent), where he also held a coaching position.

== Coaching and management career ==
In February 1963 he became manager of Exeter City, remaining in charge until early 1965.

Edwards was appointed as Torquay United manager in October 1971, a post he held until January 1973. He later returned to Exeter, for a short spell, before becoming assistant manager at Plymouth Argyle. He subsequently served Leeds United as a scout.
