= Paul Holmes (footballer) =

English footballer (1968–2024)

Personal information
- Full name: Paul Holmes
- Date of birth: 18 February 1968
- Place of birth: Stocksbridge, England
- Date of death: 7 May 2024 (aged 56)
- Place of death: Torquay, England
- Height: 5 ft 10 in (1.78 m)
- Position: Right back

Senior career*
| Years | Team | Apps | (Gls) |
| 1986–1988 | Doncaster Rovers | 47 | (1) |
| 1988–1992 | Torquay United | 138 | (4) |
| 1992–1993 | Birmingham City | 12 | (0) |
| 1993–1996 | Everton | 21 | (0) |
| 1996 | → West Bromwich Albion (loan) | 4 | (0) |
| 1996–1999 | West Bromwich Albion (Note: The English National Football Archive confirms that Holmes made four league appearances (and one in the Anglo-Italian Cup) before his transfer was made permanent on 15 February 1996.) | 99 | (1) |
| 1999–2003 | Torquay United | 87 | (2) |
| Total | | 408 | (8) |
- * Club domestic league appearances and goals

Paul Holmes (18 February 1968 – 7 May 2024) was an English professional footballer who played as a right back. He made more than 400 appearances in the Football League and Premier League playing for Doncaster Rovers, Torquay United, Birmingham City, Everton and West Bromwich Albion. His father, Albert Holmes, played football for Chesterfield. Holmes died aged 56 at Rowcroft Hospice, Torquay, on 7 May 2024, after being diagnosed with cancer in 2023.

== Honours ==
Torquay United

- Football League Fourth Division play-offs: 1991
