= Johnny McNeil =

Scottish footballer and manager

John Law McNeil (1 September 1906 - 20 March 1971) was born in Inverkeithing and was a Scottish football player (a centre-half), and manager. He was born as John Law and later took the McNeil surname after his mother re-married with Law often cited as his middle name, though it was his previous surname.

McNeil signed for Portsmouth from Musselburgh Bruntonians In December 1928. He moved to Reading in January 1930 where he was a regular for a while. After a spell with non-league Guildford City he moved to Inverness Caledonian from where he joined Plymouth Argyle in August 1934. He played 143 times, scoring 13 goals for Plymouth, leaving Home Park in the summer of 1939 when he joined Clapton Orient.

He later managed Merthyr Tydfil until June 1947, when he was appointed as manager of Torquay United. His first season was not a great success, Torquay finishing in 18th place, but the following two seasons saw finishes in 9th and 5th and the discovery of future club greats Don Mills and Sammy Collins. He resigned in March 1950 to take the manager's job at Second Division Bury, not before complaining about the low attendances at Plainmoor, even when the team was doing relatively well. His time at Gigg Lane saw Bury constantly battle against relegation – albeit to his credit this was achieved – until he left in November 1953.

He died in Crieff on 20th March 1971, aged 64 years old.

He was 6 ft 0 in (1.83 m) tall.
