= Dean Crombie =

English footballer

Personal information
- Date of birth: 9 August 1957 (age 69)
- Place of birth: Lincoln, England
- Height: 6 ft 0 in (1.83 m)
- Position: Defender

Youth career
- Lincoln United
- Adelaide Park
- Lincoln City Juniors
- Ruston Bucyrus

Senior career*
Years	Team	Apps	(Gls)
1977–1978	Lincoln City	33	(1)
1978–1987	Grimsby Town	320	(4)
1987	→ Reading (loan)	4	(0)
1987–1991	Bolton Wanderers	95	(1)
1991	Lincoln City	1	(0)

Managerial career
- 1991–1998: Bolton Wanderers Academy
- * Club domestic league appearances and goals

Dean Crombie (born 9 August 1957) is an English former professional footballer.

== Playing career ==
Crombie came through the youth ranks of local side Lincoln United and played Sunday football for Adelaide Park also playing for Lincoln City juniors and Ruston Bucyrus first team before joining Lincoln City, managed by Graham Taylor, in 1977 as a professional player. He later transferred to Grimsby Town where he spent nine years as a regular player in the first team winning a promotion and a championship with Grimsby. After leaving Grimsby in 1987 he was signed by Bolton Wanderers managed by Phil Neal gaining promotion and scoring at Wembley in the Sherpa Van final with Bolton winning 4–1 he finished his career with Bolton Wanderers, in 1991 although he did have a brief spell as Assistant player manager at Lincoln City where he made one appearance before returning to Bolton to take up a coaching position.

== Coaching career ==
After a long playing career Crombie continued to work for several years at Bolton Wanderers taking up a number of positions within the club initially as youth coach before moving into a senior coaching position with the 1st team and then taking on the role of chief scout. He then left Bolton to become a football agent for 2 years before returning to Bolton to recruit players for the Academy. He then moved to Wigan Athletic as the Centre of Excellence Manager. Crombie returned to Bolton after 3 years at Wigan to take up the role of Head of Academy Recruitment where he spent a further 6 years before he left the role in 2014. He rejoined Wigan Athletic on a part time basis where he became a scout reporting mainly on up and coming opposition, after spending a further four years at Wigan he joined Sunderland FC in similar role where he spent the next two years.

== Honours ==
Grimsby Town

- Football League Third Division: 1979–80

Bolton Wanderers

- Associate Members' Cup: 1988–89

Individual

- Grimsby Town Player of the Season: 1980
- Bolton Wanderers Player of the Year: 1989
