= Andy Rowland (footballer, born 1965) =

English footballer (1965–2017)

Personal information
- Full name: Andrew James Rowland
- Date of birth: 1 October 1965 (age 61)
- Place of birth: Taunton, England
- Date of death: 2017 (aged 51–52)
- Position: Forward

Youth career
- Torquay United

Senior career*
Years	Team	Apps	(Gls)
- Kiveton Park
- Exmouth Town
1989–1991	Southampton	0	(0)
1991–?	Torquay United	16	(1)
- Tiverton Town
- * Club domestic league appearances and goals

Andrew James Rowland (1 October 1965 – 2017) was an English footballer who played in the Football League for Torquay United. He came on as a substitute in Torquay's 1991 Play-off final win at Wembley. Rowland died in 2017.

== Honours ==
Torquay United

- Football League Fourth Division play-offs: 1991
