= Stewart Evans =

English former professional footballer

Personal information
- Full name: Stewart John Evans
- Date of birth: 15 November 1960 (age 65)
- Place of birth: Rotherham, England
- Height: 6 ft 4 in (1.93 m)
- Positions: Centre forward; defender

Youth career
- Rotherham United

Senior career*
Years	Team	Apps	(Gls)
1978–1979	Rotherham United	0	(0)
1979–1980	Gainsborough Trinity		
1980–1982	Sheffield United	0	(0)
1982–1986	Wimbledon	175	(50)
1986–1987	West Bromwich Albion	14	(1)
1987–1988	Plymouth Argyle	45	(10)
1988–1991	Rotherham United	65	(14)
1991	Torquay United (loan)	15	(5)
1991–1994	Crewe Alexandra	83	(12)
1994–199x	Denaby United		
199x–1999	Maltby Main		
1999–200x	Parkgate		

Managerial career
- 2002–2004: Parkgate
- * Club domestic league appearances and goals

Stewart John Evans (born 15 November 1960) is an English former professional footballer who scored 92 goals from 397 games in the Football League playing for Wimbledon, West Bromwich Albion, Plymouth Argyle, Rotherham United, Torquay United and Crewe Alexandra.

== Career ==
Evans was born in Rotherham, then in the West Riding of Yorkshire. A tall centre-forward who could also play in the centre of defence, he began his career as an apprentice with Rotherham United. He turned professional in November 1978, but was released without making his league debut. In November 1980 he joined Sheffield United from Gainsborough Trinity, but left to join Wimbledon in March 1982 before appearing in the Blades first team.

He had more success with the Dons, instantly slotting into Dave Bassett's side, partnering Alan Cork up front. He helped Wimbledon to promotions from the Fourth to the First Division, scoring 50 times in 175 games in the process, but in August 1986, just before Wimbledon were about to embark on their first ever season in the top flight, Evans was sold to newly relegated West Bromwich Albion for £60,000. He stayed less than a season at the Hawthorns, joining Plymouth Argyle for £50,000 and, after recovering from injury played his part in Argyle's surprising challenge for promotion.

In November 1988, after 10 goals in 45 games for the Pilgrims, he moved to Rotherham United for £40,000. He joined Torquay United on loan in March 1991, hitting 5 goals in 15 games and playing in the successful play-off final at Wembley against Blackpool. In September that year he left Rotherham, after 14 goals in 65 league games, joining Crewe Alexandra. He played 83 times for Crewe, scoring 12 times, but left after helping them to promotion in the 1993–94 season.

Evans then moved back into non-League football with Denaby United, where he won the Northern Counties East Football League title in the 1996–97 season, Maltby Main and Parkgate. In March 2002 he took over as player-manager of the Northern Counties East League club, resigning during the 2004–05 season.

== Honours ==
Wimbledon

- Football League Fourth Division: 1982–83

Rotherham United

- Football League Fourth Division: 1988–89

Torquay United

- Football League Fourth Division play-offs: 1991
