= Wes Saunders =

English footballer and manager

Personal information
- Full name: Wesley Saunders
- Date of birth: 23 February 1963 (age 63)
- Place of birth: Sunderland, England
- Height: 6 ft 0 in (1.83 m)
- Position: Central defender

Youth career
- –1981: Newcastle United

Senior career*
Years	Team	Apps	(Gls)
1981–1985	Newcastle United	79	(0)
1985	→ Bradford City (loan)	4	(0)
1985–1988	Carlisle United	97	(11)
1988–1990	Dundee	50	(2)
1990–1993	Torquay United	61	(6)
- Spennymoor United
Total		291	(19)

Managerial career
- 1991–1992: Torquay United (caretaker)
- 1998–2001: Torquay United
- * Club domestic league appearances and goals

Wesley Saunders (born 23 February 1963) is an English former professional football player and manager, who played as a central defender. He played for Newcastle United, Bradford City, Carlisle United and Torquay United in the Football League and Dundee in the Scottish Football League. He later managed Torquay United from 1998 to 2001.

== Playing career ==
Saunders was born in Sunderland and brought up in East Boldon, attending Boldon Comprehensive School. He began his career as a junior with Newcastle United, turning professional in June 1981.

Increasingly out of the first team picture at Newcastle United, Saunders joined Bradford City on loan in March 1985, moving to Carlisle United for a fee of £20,000 in August 1985.

Saunders subsequently joined Dundee before joining Torquay United in July 1990 for a then club record fee of £60,000. He captained the Torquay United side to promotion the following season, Torquay United beating Blackpool on penalties in the play-off final at Wembley. The following season he had a lengthy spell as caretaker manager of the team following the sacking of John Impey, and reverted to his playing role upon the appointment of Ivan Golac as manager. His professional playing career was ended by a knee ligament injury just a couple years later.

On leaving Torquay United he played non-league football for Spennymoor United and went on to play for and coach a number of non-league sides in the north east of England while working in his family's textile firm.

== Management career ==
In summer 1998, Saunders became manager of Torquay United, this time on a permanent basis, after the departure of Kevin Hodges. He struggled to maintain the progress made by Hodges and in the 2000–01 season, Torquay struggled to the extent that former player Colin Lee was brought in as a consultant. Saunders was dismissed by Torquay on 28 March 2001 after a 1–0 defeat to Carlisle United the previous week had left the club at the bottom of the league and facing relegation to the Football Conference.

He subsequently became a player agent and his players included former England international Paul Gascoigne.

== Honours ==
Torquay United

- Football League Fourth Division play-offs: 1991
