= Phil Lloyd (footballer) =

English footballer

Personal information
- Date of birth: 26 December 1964 (age 61)
- Place of birth: Hemsworth, England
- Position: Central defender

Senior career*
Years	Team	Apps	(Gls)
1982–1983	Middlesbrough	0	(0)
1983–1984	Barnsley	0	(0)
1984–1987	Darlington	137	(3)
1987–1992	Torquay United	170	(7)
- Elmore
Total		307	(10)
- * Club domestic league appearances and goals

Phil Lloyd (born 26 December 1964) is an English former professional footballer who played as a central defender.

== Career ==
Born in Hemsworth, Lloyd played for Middlesbrough, Barnsley, Darlington, Torquay United and Elmore.

== Honours ==
Torquay United

- Associate Members' Cup runner-up: 1988–89
