= Matt Elliott (footballer) =

Footballer (born 1968)

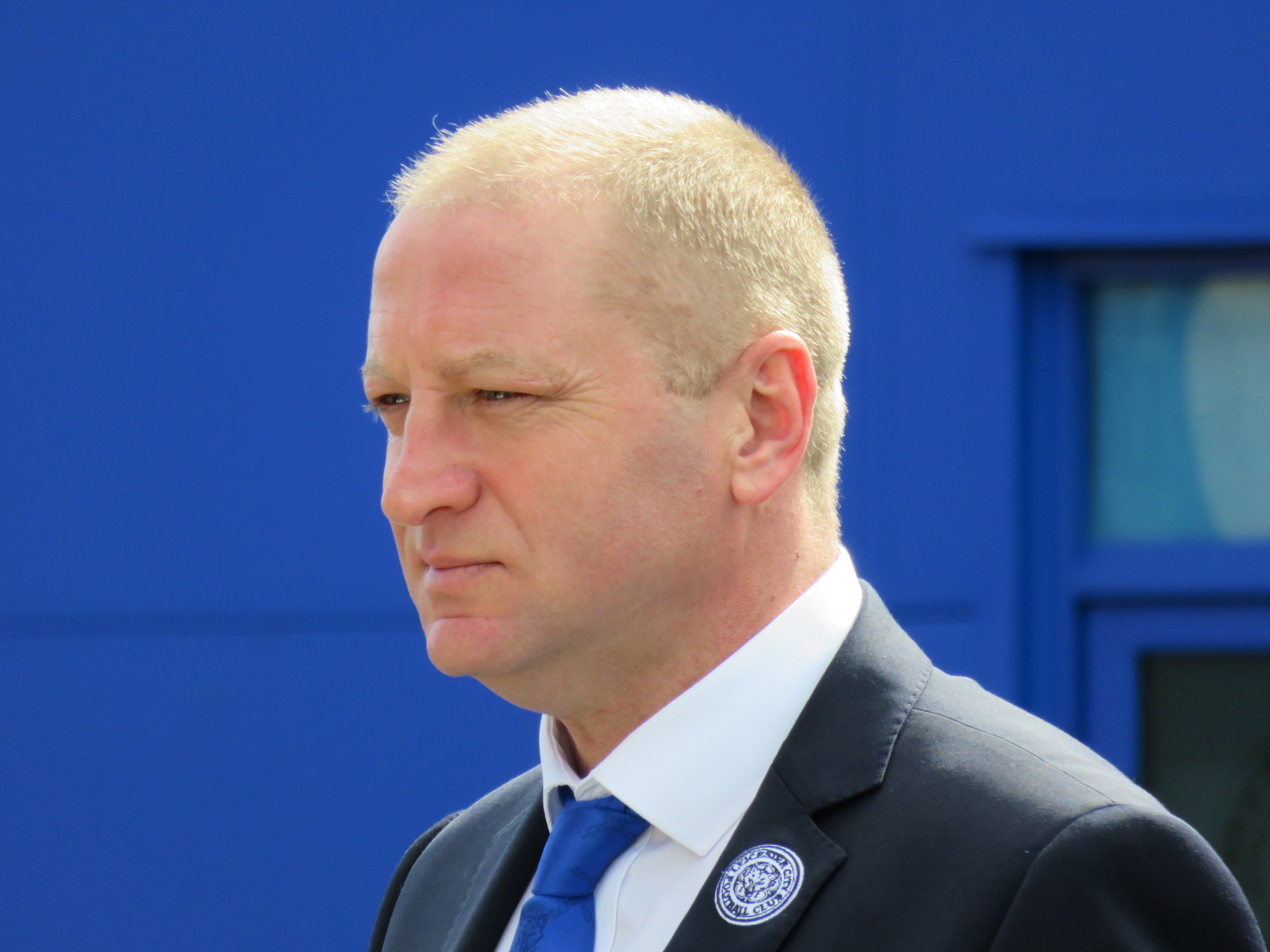
- Elliott in 2016

Personal information
- Full name: Matthew Stephen Elliott
- Date of birth: 1 November 1968 (age 58)
- Place of birth: Wandsworth, England
- Position: Defender

Youth career
- Leatherhead
- 1987–1988: Epsom & Ewell

Senior career*
Years	Team	Apps	(Gls)
1988–1989	Charlton Athletic	1	(0)
1989–1992	Torquay United	124	(15)
1992	→ Scunthorpe United (loan)	8	(1)
1992–1993	Scunthorpe United	53	(7)
1993–1997	Oxford United	148	(21)
1997–2005	Leicester City	245	(26)
2004	→ Ipswich Town (loan)	10	(0)
Total		589	(70)

International career
1997–2001	Scotland	18	(1)

Managerial career
- 2011: Stafford Rangers (caretaker)
- 2014: Army United
Medal record
Representing Leicester City F.C.
Gold medal – first place	League Cup	2000
- * Club domestic league appearances and goals

Matthew Stephen Elliott (born 1 November 1968) is a former professional footballer, most notably as a defender for Leicester City. Born in England, he played for the Scotland national team.

He captained Leicester to victory in the 2000 Football League Cup Final scoring both goals.

== Club career ==
Elliott began his career in non-league football with Leatherhead and Epsom & Ewell, before getting his first taste of professional football with Charlton Athletic. Unable to break into the Charlton first-team, he moved to Torquay United within a year. He then worked his way up the ladder, signing for Scunthorpe United in March 1992, moving on to Oxford United in November 1993, and finally getting his chance in the Premiership when he was signed by Leicester City in early 1997 for a transfer fee of £1.6 million. This remained the record for a sale by Oxford until 2016, when Kemar Roofe moved to Leeds United. He was cup-tied for their victory in the 1997 Football League Cup Final.

Elliott became a mainstay in a Leicester side that surprised many in the top flight, and also performed well in cup competitions. The defender became synonymous with The Foxes' bruising style of play that made them one of the hardest sides to play in the Premiership. Elliott sometimes courted controversy with his discipline throughout his time at Leicester, but remained a key player under both Martin O'Neill and his successor Peter Taylor.

Elliott was influential in Leicester's run to the 2000 Football League Cup Final, and their victory in the game itself. He scored the only goal of the two-legged semi final against Aston Villa and then scored both goals in the final as Leicester beat Tranmere Rovers 2–1.

When Martin O'Neill left to manage Celtic in July 2000, he made an attempt to lure Elliott to the club in a £3.5 million bid (O'Neill would raid his former club for the likes of Neil Lennon and Steve Guppy). It was unsuccessful when Elliott signed the last contract of his career in August 2001, which would last until June 2005. Elliott's made his last European appearance in a 3–1 defeat to Red Star Belgrade in Vienna on 28 September 2000 in the 2001 UEFA Cup.

He had a loan spell at Ipswich Town before his retirement. His final season was thwarted by a knee injury and, after making only three appearances, Elliott retired from football in January 2005.

== International career ==
Elliott won 18 caps for the Scotland national team, scoring one goal which was a header from an Allan Johnston cross in a 2–0 win against San Marino. He made 16 starts and two appearances from the bench, including his debut against France in November 1997. He was in the Scotland squad for the 1998 World Cup although he did not appear in any of the games.

== After retirement ==
=== Coaching ===
On 9 June 2008, Elliott was unveiled as the new assistant manager to former Torquay teammate Dean Edwards at Northern Premier League team Hednesford Town. After a season that saw the Pitmen finish just outside the play-offs, Elliott stepped down from his position at Keys Park in May 2009 to concentrate on other business interests. He then became assistant manager of Midland Alliance side Oadby Town, until in October 2010 he became assistant manager of Conference North club Stafford Rangers, working under Tim Flowers. Elliott was appointed manager after Flowers resigned from his managerial role on 11 January 2011.

In January 2014, Elliott became manager of Thailand Premier League side Army United, a club affiliated with Elliott's former club, Leicester City. Elliott left Army United in June 2014 with the side in 11th place, in order to take up a role with Leicester City.

In September 2015 De Montfort University announced that Elliott had been appointed first team coach for the University's men's and women's teams.

=== Media ===
In August 2014, Elliott took over as an analyst for BBC Radio Leicester. On 10 October 2015, Elliott was interviewed on Danny Baker's 5Live radio show, discussing his life and career.

== Honours ==
Torquay United

- Football League Fourth Division play-offs: 1991
- Associate Members' Cup runner-up: 1988–89

Oxford United

- Football League Second Division runner-up: 1995–96

Leicester City

- Football League Cup: 1999–2000; runner-up: 1998–99
- Football League First Division runner-up: 2002–03

Individual

- PFA Team of the Year: 1992–93 Third Division
- Alan Hardaker Trophy: 2000

== See also ==
- List of Scotland international footballers born outside Scotland
