= John Impey =

English association football player and manager (born 1954)

Personal information
- Full name: John Edward Impey
- Date of birth: 11 August 1954 (age 72)
- Place of birth: Exeter, England
- Height: 5 ft 11 in (1.80 m)
- Position: Centre-back

Youth career
- Cardiff City

Senior career*
Years	Team	Apps	(Gls)
1972–1975	Cardiff City	21	(0)
1975–1983	AFC Bournemouth	284	(7)
1979	→ Seattle Sounders (loan)	22	(1)
1983–1985	Torquay United	72	(0)
1985–1986	Exeter City	26	(0)
1986–1988	Torquay United	58	(2)
1988–1989	Weymouth		(1)
1989–1990	Tiverton Town		(5)

International career
1969	England Schoolboys	1	(0)
1973	England Youth	5	(0)

Managerial career
- 1989: Weymouth (caretaker manager)
- 1991: Torquay United
- 1999–200x: Totnes Town
- * Club domestic league appearances and goals

John Edward Impey (born 11 August 1954) is an English former professional football player and manager. As player, he made 461 appearances in the Football League representing Cardiff City, AFC Bournemouth, Torquay United and Exeter City, and spent a season in the North American Soccer League with the Seattle Sounders. As manager, he led Torquay United to promotion from the Football League Fourth Division. He represented England at Schools and Youth level.

== Career ==
Impey joined Cardiff City as a 14-year-old after being spotted playing at Barnstaple for Exeter Schools against North Devon Schools. He turned professional with Cardiff in August 1972, moving on to AFC Bournemouth in July 1975 where he established himself as a centre-back. He spent the summer of 1979 on loan with the Seattle Sounders in the North American Soccer League. He made a total of 284 league appearances for Bournemouth before leaving to join Torquay United in August 1983.

He moved to Exeter City in July 1985 for a season but returned to Torquay in July 1986 and was appointed as captain by new manager Cyril Knowles a year later as Torquay almost reached the play-offs. He retired from full-time football after one more season, and joined Conference club Weymouth as player-assistant manager, spending a brief period as caretaker manager in early 1989. In the 1989–90 season he played in the Western Football League for Tiverton Town.

Impey remained at Torquay United as youth coach under first Knowles and then Dave Smith. Smith was dismissed in April 1991 after Torquay's promotion push appeared to be falling apart and Impey was appointed manager, the first to be appointed by chairman Mike Bateson, guiding them to the play-offs by finishing in seventh place in the Fourth Division. They beat Burnley in the play-off semi-final and on 31 May 1991 Impey led his side out at Wembley for the final against Blackpool. The game went to a penalty shootout, which went to sudden death. Goalkeeper Gareth Howells scored Torquay's sixth penalty, Blackpool forward Dave Bamber missed, and Torquay were in the Third Division for the first time in 19 years. Impey was dismissed in October 1991 after Torquay had lost seven of the first eight games of the season.

In July 1999 he was appointed manager of Totnes Town, a position he still held in April 2000. In May 2001, the Herald Express reported that Impey was still living in Torquay.

== Honours ==
Torquay United

- Football League Fourth Division play-offs: 1991
