= Chris Curran (footballer, born September 1971) =

English footballer

Personal information
- Full name: Christopher Curran
- Date of birth: 17 September 1971 (age 55)
- Place of birth: Birmingham, England
- Height: 5 ft 11 in (1.80 m)
- Position: Defender

Youth career
- 1988–1990: Torquay United

Senior career*
Years	Team	Apps	(Gls)
1990–1995	Torquay United	152	(4)
1995–1997	Plymouth Argyle	30	(0)
1997–2003	Exeter City	157	(6)
2002–2003	→ Tiverton Town (loan)	8	(1)
2004	Weymouth	0	(0)
2004–2005	Willenhall Town		
2005	Newport County	9	(0)
2005–2006	Willenhall Town		
- * Club domestic league appearances and goals

Christopher Curran (born 17 September 1971) is an English former professional footballer.

Curran was born in Birmingham and began his career as a trainee with Torquay United, making his debut during the 1989–90 season whilst still a trainee. He turned professional on 13 July 1990 and went on to make 152 appearances for the Gulls, scoring 4 goals. On 22 December 1995 he was, surprisingly, sold to local rivals Plymouth Argyle for £40,000, but failed to settle at Home Park, moving to Exeter City on 31 July 1997 for £20,000.

This move made him one of only a handful of players to have played for all three of the Football League sides in Devon. He made an impressive start to his career at Exeter, but in September 1997 picked up a serious knee ligament injury which ruled him out for the remainder of the season. He returned to the side and a regular place in the team, so much so that he was one of only a handful of players not released or transfer listed by manager Noel Blake in May 2000.

He was appointed as club captain and in January 2001 was sent off in the game against Torquay United after only six minutes of the game.

Having struggled with knee and hamstring problems, Curran was loaned to Tiverton Town in December 2002. He played eight times for Tiverton, before being recalled by Exeter as they unsuccessfully struggled to avoid relegation from the Football League. He suffered a ruptured Achilles tendon just before the end of the 2002–03 season and was released by Exeter.

He relocated back to the Midlands to recuperate and enrolled on a Physical Education course at the University of Wolverhampton.

In February 2004 he was reported to be looking to join a non-league club, and agreed terms with Weymouth, managed by Steve Claridge, the following month. However, he failed to appear for Weymouth and returned to the Midlands.

He joined Willenhall Town in August 2004. In January 2005 he joined Newport County on trial, which resulted in a permanent move. He was released by Newport in September 2005 and returned to Willenhall Town.

== Honours ==
Torquay United

- Football League Fourth Division play-offs: 1991

Plymouth Argyle

- Football League Third Division play-offs: 1996
