= Gareth Howells =

English footballer

Personal information
- Full name: Gareth Jonathan Howells
- Date of birth: 13 June 1970 (age 56)
- Place of birth: Guildford, England
- Position: Goalkeeper

Senior career*
Years	Team	Apps	(Gls)
1988–1990	Tottenham Hotspur	0	(0)
1989	→ Swindon Town (loan)	0	(0)
1990	→ Leyton Orient (loan)	0	(0)
1990	→ Enfield (loan)		
1990–1992	Torquay United	83	(0)
1992	Farnborough Town		
1992	Kettering Town		
1993–1995	Hellenic		
1995	Dorking		
1996–1998	St Albans City	209	
1999–2001	Sutton United		
2001–2003	Aldershot Town		
2003	Havant & Waterlooville		
- * Club domestic league appearances and goals

Gareth Jonathan Howells (born 13 June 1970) is an English former footballer who played in the Football League for Torquay United.

== Honours ==
Torquay United

- Football League Fourth Division play-offs: 1991
