= 1991 Football League play-offs =

Football League play-offs
- Season: 1990–91
- Champions: Notts County (Second Division); Tranmere Rovers (Third Division); Torquay United (Fourth Division)
- Matches played: 15
- Goals scored: 36 (2.4 per match)
- Biggest home win: Brighton 4–1 Millwall (Second Division)
- Biggest away win: Millwall 1–2 Brighton (Second Division)
- Highest scoring: Brighton 4–1 Millwall (5 goals)
- Highest attendance: 59,940 – Brighton v Notts County (Second Division final)
- Lowest attendance: 5,600 – Torquay v Burnley (Fourth Division semi-final)
- Average attendance: 17,629

The Football League play-offs for the 1990–91 season were held in May and June 1991, with the finals taking place at Wembley Stadium. The play-off semi-finals were also played over two legs and were contested by the teams who finished in 3rd, 4th, 5th and 6th place in the Football League Second Division, the 4th, 5th, 6th and 7th placed teams in the Football League Third Division and the 3rd, 4th, 5th and 6th place teams in the Football League Fourth Division table. The winners of the semi-finals progressed through to the finals, with the winner of these matches gaining promotion for the following season.

== Second Division ==
Pos	Team	Pld	W	D	L	GF	GA	GD	Pts
4	Notts County	46	23	11	12	76	55	+21	80
5	Millwall	46	20	13	13	70	51	+19	73
6	Brighton & Hove Albion	46	21	7	18	63	69	–6	70
7	Middlesbrough	46	20	9	17	66	47	+19	69

=== Semi-finals ===
First leg

19 May 1991
12:00

Brighton & Hove Albion	4–1	Millwall
Barham 40'; Small 53'; Walker 55'; Codner 60'		Stephenson 14'

Goldstone Ground, Brighton
Attendance: 15,390
Referee: Keith Hackett

19 May 1991
12:00

Middlesbrough	1–1	Notts County
Phillips 86'		Turner 27'

Ayresome Park, Middlesbrough
Attendance: 22,343
Referee: Tony Ward

Second leg

22 May 1991
19:45

Millwall	1–2	Brighton & Hove Albion
McGinlay 17'		Codner 47'; Robinson 72'

The Den, London
Attendance: 17,370
Referee: John Martin

Brighton & Hove Albion won 6–2 on aggregate.

22 May 1991
19:45

Notts County	1–0	Middlesbrough
Harding 78'

Meadow Lane, Nottingham
Attendance: 16,249

Notts County won 2–1 on aggregate.

=== Final ===
2 June 1991
15:00

Brighton and Hove Albion	1–3	Notts County
Wilkins 89'		Johnson 29', 59'; Regis 71'

Wembley Stadium, London
Attendance: 59,940
Referee: David Elleray

== Third Division ==
Pos	Team	Pld	W	D	L	GF	GA	GD	Pts
4	Bolton Wanderers	46	24	11	11	64	50	+14	83
5	Tranmere Rovers	46	23	9	14	64	46	+18	78
6	Brentford	46	21	13	12	59	47	+12	76
7	Bury	46	20	13	13	67	56	+11	73

=== Semi-finals ===
First leg

19 May 1991
12:00

Bury	1–1	Bolton Wanderers
Lee 42' (pen.)		Philliskirk 59' (pen.)

Gigg Lane, Bury
Attendance: 8,000

19 May 1991
15:00

Brentford	2–2	Tranmere Rovers
Evans 13'; Godfrey 90'		Cooper 52', 72'

Griffin Park, London
Attendance: 9,330

Second leg

22 May 1991
19:30

Bolton Wanderers	1–0	Bury
Philliskirk 45'

Burnden Park, Bolton
Attendance: 19,198

Bolton Wanderers won 2–1 on aggregate.

22 May 1991
19:30

Tranmere Rovers	1–0	Brentford
Brannan 34'

Prenton Park, Birkenhead
Attendance: 11,438

Tranmere Rovers won 3–2 on aggregate.

=== Final ===
1 June 1991
15:00

Bolton Wanderers	0–1 (a.e.t.)	Tranmere Rovers
		Malkin 98'

Wembley Stadium, London
Attendance: 30,217
Referee: Keith Hackett

== Fourth Division ==
Pos	Team	Pld	W	D	L	GF	GA	GD	Pts
5	Blackpool	46	23	10	13	78	47	+31	79
6	Burnley	46	23	10	13	70	51	+19	79
7	Torquay United	46	18	18	10	64	47	+17	72
8	Scunthorpe United	46	20	11	15	71	62	+9	71

=== Semi-finals ===
First leg

19 May 1991
12:00

Scunthorpe United	1–1	Blackpool
Lillis 77'		Rodwell 57'

Glanford Park, Scunthorpe
Attendance: 6,536

19 May 1991
12:00

Torquay United	2–0	Burnley
Edwards 5'; Elliott 83'

Plainmoor, Torquay
Attendance: 5,600

Second leg

22 May 1991
19:30

Blackpool	2–1	Scunthorpe United
Eyres 55', 66'		Hill 38'

Bloomfield Road, Blackpool
Attendance: 7,596

Blackpool won 3–2 on aggregate.

22 May 1991
19:30

Burnley	1–0	Torquay United
Evans 90' (o.g.)

Turf Moor, Burnley
Attendance: 13,620

Torquay United won 2–1 on aggregate.

=== Final ===
31 May 1991
20:00

Blackpool	2–2 (a.e.t.)	Torquay United
Groves 7'; Curran 68' (o.g.)		Saunders 28'; Edwards 37' (pen.)
Penalties
Rodwell (penalty missed); Taylor (penalty scored); Gore (penalty scored); Groves (penalty scored); Garner (penalty scored); Bamber (penalty missed)	4–5	(penalty missed) Loram; (penalty scored) M. Holmes; (penalty scored) Saunders; (penalty scored) P. Holmes; (penalty scored) Myers; (penalty scored) Howells

Wembley Stadium, London
Attendance: 21,615
Referee: George Courtney
