= Dean Edwards (footballer) =

English footballer and manager

Personal information
- Full name: Dean Stephen Edwards
- Date of birth: 25 February 1962 (age 64)
- Place of birth: Wolverhampton, England
- Height: 5 ft 11 in (1.80 m)
- Position: Forward

Youth career
- 1980: Shrewsbury Town

Senior career*
Years	Team	Apps	(Gls)
1980–1982	Shrewsbury Town	13	(2)
1982	Kuopion Palloseura	3	(0)
1982–1984	Vaasan Palloseura	38	(42)
1983–1985	Telford United	54	(24)
1985–1987	Wolverhampton Wanderers	31	(10)
1987–1988	Exeter City	54	(17)
1988–1991	Torquay United	116	(30)
1991–1992	Exeter City	4	(0)
1992	Northampton Town	7	(0)
1992	Sliema Wanderers	6	(2)
1993	Hong Kong Rangers	4	(2)
1996–1998	Bideford		
2004	Pelsall Villa		
2006–2008	Willenhall Town		

Managerial career
- 1996–1998: Bideford (player/manager)
- 2004: Pelsall Villa (player/manager)
- 2007–2008: Willenhall Town (player/manager)
- 2008–2009: Hednesford Town
- 2019–2021: Barnstaple Town
- * Club domestic league appearances and goals

Dean Stephen Edwards (born 25 February 1962) is an English former professional footballer. After starting his career at Shrewsbury Town, he played for Kuopion Palloseura and Vaasan Palloseura in Finland, before returning to England to play for Telford United, Wolverhampton Wanderers, Exeter City, Torquay United and Northampton Town, scoring for Torquay in two different Wembley appearances. After ending his career at Sliema Wanderers and Hong Kong Rangers, he managed several clubs in non-league football.

== Playing career ==
Edwards was born in Wolverhampton and began his career as an apprentice with Shrewsbury Town, turning professional in February 1980. He played only 13 times, in the old 2nd division (now Championship) scoring twice for the Shrews before joining Finnish side Kuopion Palloseura. From there he moved to Vaasan Palloseura. He subsequently moved to Telford United from where he joined Wolverhampton Wanderers in October 1985, playing for Wolves and forming a partnership with Andy Mutch.

He left Molineux in March 1987, having scored 10 times in 30, joining Exeter City. He became a regular both on the teamsheet and the scoresheet at Exeter, hitting the net 17 times in 54 league games before moving to Torquay United in August 1988.

He became an integral part of Cyril Knowles' side, scoring Torquay's goal at Wembley in the Football League Trophy final defeat against Bolton Wanderers, 1989 and scored again at Wembley two years later v Blackpool as Torquay won promotion via the play-offs to league 1 1991.

In December 1991 he moved back to Exeter City on a free transfer, having played 116 league games and scored 26 league goals for the Gulls. He stayed only a few months at Exeter before another short spell at Northampton Town to finish his league career. He played in Hong Kong, and Malta with Sliema Wanderers.

== Managerial career ==
In Autumn 1996 he became player-manager of Bideford in the Western League, but resigned on 30 July 1998 out of despair at the lack of commitment to pre-season training amongst his squad.

In January 2004, Edwards was appointed as player-manager of non-league side Pelsall Villa.

In March 2006 he became assistant manager, under former Wolves teammate Mel Eves, at Willenhall Town and in September 2006, at the age of 44, was still registered as a player for Willenhall. After Eves departed in October 2007, Edwards took over as manager.

Edwards resigned as Willenhall manager in April 2008 and was appointed manager of Northern Premier League side Hednesford Town the following month. After a strong start took them to the top of the table, a dramatic dip in form saw the Pitmen eventually finish outside the play-offs, despite spending the majority of the season in the top five. He won the Birmingham senior cup for the first time in 73 years, signing players Tyrone Barnett, (Peterborough), Ross Draper (Inverness Caledonian), and Elliott Durrell (Wrexham).

The 2009–10 season saw Hednesford return to the Southern League, after the league restructured, with Edwards bringing in a number of experienced names in a bid to push the club back into the Conference North. Shortly after being knocked out of the FA Cup by Hellenic League minnows Pegasus Juniors at the first qualifying round stage, Edwards departed the club on 15 September 2009.

In June 2015 he was appointed as Director of Football at Torquay United. However, he left the club in September 2015. In October 2019 Edwards was appointed the manager of Barnstaple Town. He resigned from his post at Barnstaple in September 2021.

== Honours ==
Torquay United

- Football League Fourth Division play-offs: 1991
- Associate Members' Cup runner-up: 1988–89
