= 1988–89 Associate Members' Cup =

1988–89 Associate Members Cup
Sherpa Van Trophy

Tournament details
- Country: England; Wales

The 1988–89 Associate Members' Cup (known as the 1988–89 Sherpa Van Trophy) was the eight staging of a secondary football league tournament, and the sixth staging of the Associate Members' Cup, a knock-out competition for English football clubs in the Third Division and the Fourth Division. The winners were Bolton Wanderers and the runners-up were Torquay United.

The competition began on 21 November 1988 and ended with the final on 28 May 1989 at Wembley Stadium.

In the first round, there were two sections (North and South) split into eight groups. Each section gradually eliminates teams in knock-out rounds until each has a finalist. At this point, the two winning finalists face each other in the combined final for the honour of the trophy.

== Preliminary round ==
=== Northern Section ===
Group 1
Team	Pld	W	D	L	GF	GA	GD	Pts
Scarborough	2	1	1	0	5	1	+4	4
Darlington	2	1	0	1	3	6	−3	3
Carlisle United	2	0	1	1	3	4	−1	1

Date	Team 1	Score	Team 2
29 Nov	Carlisle United	1–1	Scarborough
6 Dec	Darlington	3–2	Carlisle United
14 Dec	Scarborough	4–0	Darlington

Group 2
Team	Pld	W	D	L	GF	GA	GD	Pts
Burnley	2	2	0	0	5	0	+5	6
York City	2	1	0	1	2	2	0	3
Hartlepool United	2	0	0	2	0	5	−5	0

Date	Team 1	Score	Team 2
22 Nov	York City	0–2	Burnley
29 Nov	Burnley	3–0	Hartlepool United
13 Dec	Hartlepool United	0–2	York City

Group 3
Team	Pld	W	D	L	GF	GA	GD	Pts
Blackpool	2	2	0	0	4	1	+3	6
Wigan Athletic	2	1	0	1	3	2	+1	3
Rochdale	2	0	0	2	0	4	−4	0

Date	Team 1	Score	Team 2
22 Nov	Wigan Athletic	1–2	Blackpool
6 Dec	Blackpool	2–0	Rochdale
13 Dec	Rochdale	0–2	Wigan Athletic

Group 4
Team	Pld	W	D	L	GF	GA	GD	Pts
Grimsby Town	2	1	1	0	2	1	+1	4
Rotherham United	2	1	0	1	2	2	0	3
Doncaster Rovers	2	0	1	1	2	3	−1	1

Date	Team 1	Score	Team 2
29 Nov	Grimsby Town	1–0	Rotherham United
6 Dec	Doncaster Rovers	1–1	Grimsby Town
13 Dec	Rotherham United	2–1	Doncaster Rovers

Group 5
Team	Pld	W	D	L	GF	GA	GD	Pts
Halifax Town	2	2	0	0	3	1	+2	6
Huddersfield Town	2	1	0	1	1	1	0	3
Scunthorpe United	2	0	0	2	1	3	−2	0

Date	Team 1	Score	Team 2
6 Dec	Scunthorpe United	1–2	Halifax Town
13 Dec	Huddersfield Town	1–0	Scunthorpe United
20 Dec	Halifax Town	1–1	Huddersfield Town

Group 6
Team	Pld	W	D	L	GF	GA	GD	Pts
Preston North End	2	1	0	1	4	1	+3	3
Bolton Wanderers	2	1	0	1	1	1	0	3
Bury	2	1	0	1	1	4	−3	3

Date	Team 1	Score	Team 2
6 Dec	Bolton Wanderers	1–0	Preston North End
13 Dec	Preston North End	4–0	Bury
20 Dec	Bury	1–0	Bolton Wanderers

Group 7
Team	Pld	W	D	L	GF	GA	GD	Pts
Tranmere Rovers	2	1	1	0	3	2	+1	4
Crewe Alexandra	2	0	2	0	2	2	0	2
Stockport County	2	0	1	1	2	3	−1	1

Date	Team 1	Score	Team 2
28 Nov	Stockport County	1–1	Crewe Alexandra
5 Dec	Tranmere Rovers	2–1	Stockport County
13 Dec	Crewe Alexandra	1–1	Tranmere Rovers

Group 8
Team	Pld	W	D	L	GF	GA	GD	Pts
Wrexham	2	2	0	0	3	2	+1	6
Sheffield United	2	1	0	1	3	3	0	3
Chester City	2	0	0	2	3	4	−1	0

Date	Team 1	Score	Team 2
5 Dec	Wrexham	1–1	Sheffield United
13 Dec	Sheffield United	2–2	Chester City
21 Dec	Chester City	1–2	Wrexham

=== Southern Section ===
Group 1
Team	Pld	W	D	L	GF	GA	GD	Pts
Brentford	2	2	0	0	4	0	+4	6
Gillingham	2	1	0	1	2	3	−1	3
Fulham	2	0	0	2	1	4	−3	0

Date	Team 1	Score	Team 2
22 Nov	Fulham	0–2	Brentford
29 Nov	Brentford	2–0	Gillingham
10 Dec	Gillingham	2–1	Fulham

Group 2
Team	Pld	W	D	L	GF	GA	GD	Pts
Chesterfield	2	1	1	0	3	2	+1	4
Notts County	2	0	2	0	2	2	0	2
Mansfield Town	2	0	1	1	2	3	−1	1

Date	Team 1	Score	Team 2
29 Nov	Mansfield Town	1–1	Notts County
6 Dec	Notts County	1–1	Chesterfield
10 Dec	Chesterfield	2–1	Mansfield Town

Group 3
Team	Pld	W	D	L	GF	GA	GD	Pts
Colchester United	2	2	0	0	4	2	+2	6
Southend United	2	1	0	1	3	3	0	3
Lincoln City	2	0	0	2	2	4	−2	0

Date	Team 1	Score	Team 2
22 Nov	Southend United	2–1	Lincoln City
30 Nov	Lincoln City	1–2	Colchester United
20 Dec	Colchester United	2–1	Southend United

Group 4
Team	Pld	W	D	L	GF	GA	GD	Pts
Bristol Rovers	2	1	1	0	2	1	+1	4
Bristol City	2	1	0	1	2	1	+1	3
Exeter City	2	0	1	1	1	3	−2	1

Date	Team 1	Score	Team 2
23 Nov	Bristol Rovers	1–0	Bristol City
6 Dec	Bristol City	2–0	Exeter City
14 Dec	Exeter City	1–1	Bristol Rovers

Group 5
Team	Pld	W	D	L	GF	GA	GD	Pts
Torquay United	2	1	0	1	3	2	+1	3
Cardiff City	2	1	0	1	3	3	0	3
Swansea City	2	1	0	1	1	2	−1	3

Date	Team 1	Score	Team 2
29 Nov	Swansea City	1–0	Torquay United
6 Dec	Cardiff City	2–0	Swansea City
20 Dec	Torquay United	3–1	Cardiff City

Group 6
Team	Pld	W	D	L	GF	GA	GD	Pts
Wolverhampton Wanderers	2	1	1	0	7	3	+4	4
Hereford United	2	0	2	0	3	3	0	2
Port Vale	2	0	1	1	2	6	−4	1

Date	Team 1	Score	Team 2
21 Nov	Port Vale	1–1	Hereford United
30 Nov	Hereford United	2–2	Wolverhampton Wanderers
13 Dec	Wolverhampton Wanderers	5–1	Port Vale

Group 7
Team	Pld	W	D	L	GF	GA	GD	Pts
Reading	2	1	1	0	6	3	+3	4
Leyton Orient	2	1	1	0	4	2	+2	4
Aldershot	2	0	0	2	3	8	−5	0

Date	Team 1	Score	Team 2
30 Nov	Reading	5–2	Aldershot
6 Dec	Leyton Orient	1–1	Reading
10 Jan	Aldershot	1–3	Leyton Orient

Group 8
Team	Pld	W	D	L	GF	GA	GD	Pts
Northampton Town	2	1	1	0	3	1	+2	4
Cambridge United	2	0	2	0	3	3	0	2
Peterborough United	2	0	1	1	2	4	−2	1

Date	Team 1	Score	Team 2
22 Nov	Northampton Town	1–1	Cambridge United
29 Nov	Cambridge United	2–2	Peterborough United
21 Dec	Peterborough United	0–2	Northampton Town

== First round ==
=== Northern Section ===
Date	Home team	Score	Away team
7 January	Scarborough	3–1	York City
17 January	Blackpool	4–3	Rotherham United
17 January	Burnley	1–1	Crewe Alexandra
Crewe Alexandra won 4–2 on penalties
17 January	Grimsby Town	1–3	Huddersfield Town
17 January	Halifax Town	3–0	Darlington
17 January	Preston North End	0–1	Bolton Wanderers
17 January	Tranmere Rovers	0–1	Wigan Athletic
17 January	Wrexham	2–1	Sheffield United

=== Southern Section ===
Date	Home team	Score	Away team
17 January	Brentford	2–0	Notts County
17 January	Chesterfield	4–2	Cambridge United
17 January	Colchester United	3–1	Leyton Orient
17 January	Northampton Town	2 – 1	Southend United
17 January	Torquay United	3–0	Gillingham
18 January	Reading	2–3	Hereford United
24 January	Bristol Rovers	2–1	Cardiff City
24 January	Wolverhampton Wanderers	3–0	Bristol City

== Quarter-finals ==
=== Northern Section ===
Date	Home team	Score	Away team
21 February	Bolton Wanderers	3 – 1	Wrexham
21 February	Halifax Town	0–2	Blackpool
21 February	Huddersfield Town	1–2	Scarborough
21 February	Wigan Athletic	0–1	Crewe Alexandra

=== Southern Section ===
Date	Home team	Score	Away team
14 February	Colchester United	0–1	Hereford United
21 February	Chesterfield	0–1	Brentford
21 February	Wolverhampton Wanderers	3 – 1	Northampton Town
22 February	Bristol Rovers	0–1	Torquay United

== Area semi-finals ==
=== Northern Section ===
Date	Home team	Score	Away team
21 March	Blackpool	1 – 0	Scarborough
21 March	Crewe Alexandra	1 – 2	Bolton Wanderers

=== Southern Section ===
Date	Home team	Score	Away team
21 March	Brentford	0–1	Torquay United
22 March	Hereford United	0–2	Wolverhampton Wanderers

== Area finals ==
=== Northern Area final ===
11 April 1989

Bolton Wanderers	1–0	Blackpool
	Report

Burnden Park, Bolton
Attendance: 10,345
18 April 1989

Blackpool	(1) 1 – 1 (2)	Bolton Wanderers
	Report

Bloomfield Road, Blackpool
Attendance: 9,027

=== Southern Area final ===
12 April 1989

Torquay United	1–2	Wolverhampton Wanderers
	Report

Plainmoor, Torquay
Attendance: 4,612
18 April 1989

Wolverhampton Wanderers	(2) 0 – 2 (3)	Torquay United
	Report

Molineux Stadium, Wolverhampton
Attendance: 22,532

== Final ==
28 May 1989

Bolton Wanderers	4–1	Torquay United
Darby; Crombie; Morgan; Chandler		Edwards

Wembley Stadium, London
Attendance: 46,513
Referee: G.Courtney (Spennymoor)

== Notes ==
General

- statto.com

Specific
