= 1992 Football League Fourth Division play-off final =

Association football match

- The match was played at Wembley Stadium.
Blackpool	Scunthorpe United
1	1
- After extra time Blackpool won 4–3 on penalties
- Date: 23 May 1992
- Venue: Wembley Stadium, London
- Referee: Keith Hackett
- Attendance: 22,741
- Weather: Hot

The 1992 Football League Fourth Division play-off final was an association football match which was played on 23 May 1992 at Wembley Stadium, London, between Blackpool and Scunthorpe United to determine the fourth and final team to gain promotion from the Football League Fourth Division to the Third Division. The top three teams of the 1991–92 Football League Fourth Division, Burnley, Rotherham United and Mansfield Town, gained automatic promotion, while those placed from fourth to seventh place took part in play-offs. The winners of the play-off semi-finals competed for the final place in the Third Division for the 1992–93 season. Blackpool and Scunthorpe United beat Barnet and Crewe Alexandra, respectively, in the semi-finals.

The match was refereed by Keith Hackett in front of 22,741 spectators. In the 40th minute, Tony Rodwell won the ball from Scunthorpe's Paul Longden and his cross found Dave Bamber at the far post who scored through the legs of goalkeeper Mark Samways with a low header. Scunthorpe equalised in the 52nd minute. Tony Daws received a pass from John Buckley which he volleyed past Steve McIlhargey in the Blackpool goal to make it 1–1. No further goals were scored and with the score level, the game went into extra time. Both sides had chances to score in the additional period but the game headed to a penalty shootout. The first six penalties were converted, making it 3–3, before the two Scunthorpe substitutes, Graham Alexander and Jason White, failed to score. Blackpool won the shootout 4–3, securing promotion to the third tier of English football.

== Route to the final ==
Football League Fourth Division final table, leading positions
Pos	Team	Pld	W	D	L	GF	GA	GD	Pts
1	Burnley	42	25	8	9	79	43	+36	83
2	Rotherham United	42	22	11	9	70	37	+33	77
3	Mansfield Town	42	23	8	11	75	53	+22	77
4	Blackpool	42	22	10	10	71	45	+26	76
5	Scunthorpe United	42	21	9	12	64	59	+5	72
6	Crewe Alexandra	42	20	10	12	66	51	+15	70
7	Barnet	42	21	6	15	81	61	+20	69

Blackpool finished the regular 1991–92 season in fourth position in the Football League Fourth Division, the fourth tier of the English football league system, one place and four points ahead of Scunthorpe United. Both therefore missed out on the three automatic places for promotion to the Third Division and instead took part in the play-offs to determine the fourth promoted team. Blackpool finished one point behind Mansfield Town and Rotherham United (who were promoted in third and second place respectively, the latter with superior goal difference), and seven behind league winners Burnley.

Scunthorpe United's opponents for their play-off semi-final were Crewe Alexandra with the first match of the two-legged tie taking place at Gresty Road in Crewe on 10 May 1992. Craig Hignett gave Crewe the lead after six minutes with a strike from the edge of the Scunthorpe penalty area before Ian Helliwell equalised from close range eleven minutes later. He then scored his and Scunthorpe's second with a header ten minutes before half-time. In the 39th minute, Hignett's shot rebounded off the Scunthorpe goal-post and fell to Tony Naylor who scored to level the score. The second half was goalless and the match ended 2–2. The second leg was held three days later at Glanford Park in Scunthorpe. After a goalless first half, Dean Martin put the home side ahead in the 83rd minute before Ian Hamilton added a second one minute before full time to give Scunthorpe a 2–0 win and a 4–2 aggregate victory.

Blackpool faced Barnet in the other semi-final and the first match was played on 10 May 1992 at Underhill in London. Mark Carter scored from close range in the 27th minute when Carl Hoddle's shot was not gathered by Blackpool's goalkeeper Steve McIlhargey to give Barnet the lead. With the second half goalless, the match ended 1–0. The second leg took place three days later at Bloomfield Road in Blackpool. Both Dave Bamber and Mitch Cook made goal-line clearances for Blackpool after McIlhargey failed to clear crosses, but in the 41st minute, the home side took the lead. Bamber headed a corner from David Eyres back across goal for Paul Groves who scored with a header from close range. After McIlhargey had made a save to deny a diving header from Jonathan Hunt, Andy Garner doubled Blackpool's lead from the penalty spot after Mick Bodley was penalised for handball. Blackpool won the match 2–0 and progressed to the final with a 2–1 aggregate victory.

== Match ==
=== Background ===
This was Blackpool's second appearance in the play-offs and their second final: they had lost to Torquay United on penalties in the 1991 Football League Fourth Division play-off final at the old Wembley Stadium. Blackpool had been relegated to the fourth tier of English football in the 1989–90 season. Scunthorpe United were participating in their fourth play-offs in five seasons but were appearing in the final for the first time. They had been relegated to the Fourth Division in the 1983–84 season. The two sides had faced one another in the 1991 Football League play-offs, with Blackpool securing a 3–2 aggregate victory. During the regular 1991–92 season, both sides won their home matches 2–1, Blackpool winning at Bloomfield Road in August 1991 and Scunthorpe victorious at Glandford Park the following December.

The referee for the match was Keith Hackett. Both sides adopted a 4–4–2 formation for the final.

=== Summary ===
The match kicked off around 3 p.m. on 23 May 1992 at Wembley Stadium in hot conditions with 22,741 spectators in attendance. Scunthorpe made the better start, although in the 30th minute, Tony Rodwell made an opportunity for Bamber to score but he missed. In the 39th minute Hamilton sliced the ball over the Blackpool goal from around 8 yards (7.3 m) and a minute later, Blackpool took the lead. Rodwell won the ball from Scunthorpe's Paul Longden and his cross found Bamber at the far post who scored through the legs of Mark Samways with a low header. Neither side made any personnel changes at half time. In a much more open second half, Scunthorpe equalised in the 52nd minute. Tony Daws received a pass from John Buckley which he volleyed past McIlhargey in the Blackpool goal to make it 1–1. In the 68th minute, Blackpool made their first substitution of the match with Jamie Murphy coming on to replace Mike Davies. No further goals were scored and with the score level, the game went into extra time.

During the additional time, Bamber's shot passed just outside the Scunthorpe post and Samways made a save to deny a strike from Rodwell. Scunthorpe made a double-substitution at the beginning of the second half of extra time with Jason White and Graham Alexander, two 20-year-olds, coming on in place of Daws and Buckley. With no change to the scoreline after 120 minutes, the match went to a penalty shootout. The first six spot-kicks were converted, making it 3–3, before Alexander's weak shot was saved by McIlhargey. Eyres then made it 4–3 to Blackpool before White struck his penalty over the crossbar. Blackpool won the shootout 4–3 and secured promotion to the third tier of English football.

=== Details ===
23 May 1992	Blackpool	1–1 (a.e.t.) (4–3 p)	Scunthorpe United	Wembley Stadium, London
	Bamber 40'	Report	Daws 52'	Attendance: 22,741; Referee: Keith Hackett
	Penalties
	Cook (penalty scored); Groves (penalty scored); Garner (penalty scored); Eyres (penalty scored)		(penalty scored) Hamilton; (penalty scored) Longden; (penalty scored) Elliott; (penalty missed) Alexander; (penalty missed) White

GK	1	Steve McIlhargey
RB	2	Dave Burgess
CB	3	Mitch Cook
CB	4	Paul Groves
LB	5	Mike Davies (substituted off) 68'
RM	6	Ian Gore
CM	7	Tony Rodwell
CM	8	Phil Horner (substituted off) 90'
FW	9	Dave Bamber
FW	10	Andy Garner
LM	11	David Eyres
Substitutes:
MF	12	Jamie Murphy (substituted in) 68'
MF	13	Trevor Sinclair (substituted in) 90'
Manager:
Billy Ayre

GK	1	Mark Samways
RB	2	Joe Joyce
CB	3	Paul Longden
CB	4	Dave Hill
LB	5	Matt Elliott
RM	6	Glenn Humphries
CM	7	Dean Martin
CM	8	Ian Hamilton
FW	9	Tony Daws (substituted off) 106'
FW	10	John Buckley (substituted off) 106'
LM	11	Ian Helliwell
Substitutes:
MF	12	Jason White (substituted in) 106'
FW	13	Graham Alexander (substituted in) 106'
Manager:
Bill Green

== Post-match ==
Bill Green, the Scunthorpe manager, described it as "a very, very sad way to lose". His counterpart, Billy Ayre, was sympathetic: "It is like judging a marathon on a 40-yard sprint ... It is not a fair way of doing it and now I can say that without it sounding like sour grapes." Bamber suggested that Blackpool were worthy winners: "We finished higher in the League ... We deserved it. Justice was done."

Blackpool's next season saw them finish in eighteenth in the newly renamed Second Division (which remained third tier of English football). Scunthorpe ended their following season in thirteenth position in the newly renamed Third Division (which remained the fourth tier of English football).
