= 1991–92 Blackpool F.C. season =

English football club season

Blackpool F.C.
1991–92 season
- Owner and chairman: Owen Oyston
- Manager: Billy Ayre
- Division Four: 4th (promoted via play-offs to Division Two)
- FA Cup: Second round
- League Cup: Second round
- Top goalscorer: League: Dave Bamber (28); All: Dave Bamber (36)
- Highest home attendance: 8,007 (v. Burnley)
- Lowest home attendance: 2,155 (v. Mansfield Town)
Home colours

The 1991–92 season was Blackpool F.C.'s 84th season (81st consecutive) in the Football League. They competed in the 22-team Division Four, then the fourth tier of English football. They finished fourth, missing out on automatic promotion by one point for the second consecutive season after a final-day defeat at Lincoln City, and were promoted via the play-offs to the new Division Two. It was Billy Ayre's first full season as manager.

The first two home League fixtures saw Blackpool extend their win streak at Bloomfield Road to fifteen League games. Their 24-game unbeaten run at home ended, after just over a year, with a defeat by Crewe Alexandra on 23 November.

Dave Bamber was the club's top scorer for the second consecutive season, with 36 goals (28 in the league, one in the play-offs, one in the FA Cup and six in the League Cup).

The six goals Blackpool scored against Aldershot were expunged from the record books when the latter went out of business in March 1992, hence only 71 of Blackpool's actual 77 league goals scored in the 1991–92 season are accounted for in the table below.

== Table ==
Pos	Team	Pld	W	D	L	GF	GA	GD	Pts	Promotion or relegation
2	Rotherham United (P)	42	22	11	9	70	37	+33	77	Promotion to the Second Division (Note: From the 1992–93 season, the third tier - then known as the Third Division - was renamed to the Second Division, and the fourth tier - then known as the Fourth Division - was renamed to the Third Division.)
3	Mansfield Town (P)	42	23	8	11	75	53	+22	77	Promotion to the Second Division
4	Blackpool (O, P)	42	22	10	10	71	45	+26	76	Qualification for the Fourth Division play-offs
5	Scunthorpe United	42	21	9	12	64	59	+5	72	Qualification for the Fourth Division play-offs
6	Crewe Alexandra	42	20	10	12	66	51	+15	70	Qualification for the Fourth Division play-offs

(O) Play-off winners; (P) Promoted

== Play-offs ==
=== Semi-finals ===
Blackpool and Barnet met in the two-legged semi-finals of the play-offs. Barnet won the first leg by a single goal, at Underhill on 10 May. Blackpool, however, managed to turn the tie around in the return leg at Bloomfield Road three days later. Paul Groves (40') and an Andy Garner penalty in front of the South Stand, ten minutes into the second half, gave the Seasiders a 2–0 victory on the night and 2–1 on aggregate. A pitch invasion ensued at the final whistle.

=== Final ===
On 23 May, Blackpool met Scunthorpe United in the final at Wembley. Blackpool manager Billy Ayre was accompanied by the club mascot — his son, David — during the pre-match walk out to the centre circle.

The game finished 1–1 after normal time and extra time, a Tony Daws strike equalising Dave Bamber's close-range header. It went to a penalty-shootout, which Blackpool won 4–3. Mitch Cook, Paul Groves, Andy Garner and David Eyres were the successful takers for Blackpool, but it was Steve McIlhargey's save from substitute Graham Alexander that set up the victory. After Eyres' effort, Scunthorpe's other substitute, Jason White, stepped up, put the ball over the bar, and Blackpool were promoted.

23 May 1992
15:00 BST

Blackpool	1-1 (4-3 on penalties)	Scunthorpe United
Bamber	(Report)	Daws

Wembley Stadium, London
Attendance: 22,741
Referee: Keith Hackett, Sheffield

Blackpool

1McIlhargey
2Burgess
3Cook
4Groves (c)
5Davies (substituted off) (for Murphy)
6Gore
7Rodwell
8Horner (substituted off) (for Sinclair)
9Bamber
10Garner
11Eyres

Substitutes:

12Murphy (substituted on) (for Davies)
14Sinclair (substituted on) (for Horner)

Manager:
Billy Ayre

Scunthorpe United

1Samways
2Joyce
3Longden
4Hill
5Elliott
6Humphries
7Martin
8Hamilton
9Daws (substituted off) (for White)
10Buckley (substituted off) (for Alexander)
11Helliwell

Substitutes:

12White (substituted on) (for Daws)
14Alexander (substituted on) (for Buckley)

Manager:
Bill Green

== Player statistics ==
=== Appearances ===
Name	League	Play-offs	FA Cup	League Cup	Total
Dave Bamber	44	3	2	4	53
Paul Groves	44	3	2	4	53
David Eyres	43	3	1	4	51
Ian Gore	43	3	1	4	51
Tony Rodwell	42	3	2	4	51
Steve McIlhargey	29	3	2	4	38
Mike Davies	30	3	1	4	38
Andy Garner	31	2	1	3	37
Phil Horner	29	3	1	2	35
Trevor Sinclair	29	2	2	2	35
Gary Briggs	26	0	1	2	29
Andy Gouck	25	1	0	2	28
Paul Stoneman	20	0	2	3	25
Dave Burgess	17	3	1	0	21
Alan Wright	12	0	0	4	16
Jason Kearton	15	0	0	0	15
Dylan Kerr	13	0	0	0	13
Mitch Cook	8	3	0	0	11
Mark Taylor	9	0	1	0	10
Grant Leitch	7	0	0	0	7
Mark Bonner	4	0	1	0	5
Chris Hedworth	4	0	1	0	5
Carl Richards	3	0	0	1	4
Mark Murray	2	1	0	0	3
Andy Howard	1	0	1	0	2
Jamie Murphy	0	1	1	0	2
Gary Brook	1	0	0	0	1
Neil Mitchell	1	0	0	0	1

Players used: 28

=== Goals ===
Name	League	Play-offs	FA Cup	League Cup	Total
Dave Bamber	28	1	1	6	36
Paul Groves	10	1	1	1	13
Tony Rodwell	11	0	0	0	11
David Eyres	10	0	0	0	10
Andy Garner	4	1	0	0	5
Phil Horner	4	0	0	0	4
Trevor Sinclair	3	0	0	0	3
Andy Gouck	2	0	0	0	2
Mark Taylor	2	0	0	0	2
Mike Davies	1	0	0	0	1
Dylan Kerr	1	0	0	0	1

Total goals scored: 88

== Transfers ==
=== In ===
Date	Player	From	Fee
1991	Mark Bonner	Trainee
1991	Andy Howard	Unknown	Unknown
1991	Dylan Kerr	Leeds United	Loan
1991	Grant Leitch	Trainee
1991	Neil Mitchell	Trainee
1991	Mark Murray	Unknown	Unknown
1991	Paul Stoneman	Unknown	Unknown
9 January 1992	Jason Kearton	Everton	Two-month loan
26 March 1992	Mitch Cook	Darlington	Unknown

=== Out ===
Date	Player	To	Fee
1991	Dave Lancaster	Unknown	Unknown
1991	Alan Wright	Blackburn Rovers	£400,000
