= 1997–98 Doncaster Rovers F.C. season =

English football team season

Doncaster Rovers
1997–98 season
- Chairman: Ken Richardson
- Manager: Kerry Dixon (until August); Dave Cowling (during October); Danny Bergara (during November); Danny Bergara and Mark Weaver (from November to May)
- Stadium: Belle Vue
- Third Division: 24th (relegated)
- FA Cup: First round
- League Cup: First round
- Football League Trophy: First round
- Top goalscorer: League: Prince Moncrieffe (8); All: Prince Moncrieffe (8)
- Highest home attendance: 4,547 (vs. Nottingham Forest, 11 August)
- Lowest home attendance: 580 (vs. Rochdale, 9 December)
- Average home league attendance: 1,772
Home colours

During the 1997–98 English football season, Doncaster Rovers competed in the Football League Third Division. Doncaster had an awful season finishing bottom of the table and being relegated to the Football Conference. They lost 34 matches, setting a new league record.

== Season summary ==
Doncaster suffered the worst season in their history. They were rooted to the bottom of the table for almost the entirety of the season, had to wait 21 matches for a first league victory of the season, won only four league games all season, finished 15 points adrift of 23rd-placed Brighton & Hove Albion and lost 34 league games, the most for any English club in a season – the worst of these defeats being 7–1 at Cardiff City (who finished 21st) and 8–0 at Leyton Orient. This poor form saw Doncaster rightly relegated from the Football League to the Conference for the first time in their history.

Rovers' poor form came amidst a background of gross interference and poor judgement from the board. Player-manager Kerry Dixon was sacked in August; youth-team coach Dave Cowling replaced him, but only managed the club for two games (losing both) before resigning due to interference from chairman Ken Richardson. Cowling was replaced by experienced Uruguayan Danny Bergara, who allowed Richardson to pick the team: Bergara lasted seven games, picking up only two points. Eventually Richardson's right-hand man Mark Weaver appointed himself manager.

In 1999, Richardson was found guilty of conspiracy to set fire to the main stand at the Belle Vue ground in 1995, apparently to compel the club to relocate to a new stadium.

== Kit ==
Rovers wore four kits during the season, all produced by new kit manufacturer Olympic Sports. The first, worn from August to September, featured sleeves with jagged red shapes on a white background. An alternate kit, with the jagged red shapes also featured on white panels on the sides of the shorts, was also used during this period. From October to April Rovers wore a red kit with white panels on the sides of the shorts, plain red socks with a white band around the ankle and a buttoned collar; this kit was the only one worn by Doncaster this season to bear the club's crest. During May the club returned to wear the first kit, albeit with completely red shorts. The away kit evoked that worn by the Brazil national side, with a yellow shirt with green collar, sky blue shorts with white panels on the side, and white socks.

None of the kits worn by Doncaster this season carried sponsorship.

== Final league table ==
Pos	Team	Pld	W	D	L	GF	GA	GD	Pts	Promotion or relegation
20	Swansea City	46	13	11	22	49	62	−13	50	
21	Cardiff City	46	9	23	14	48	52	−4	50	
22	Hull City	46	11	8	27	56	83	−27	41	
23	Brighton & Hove Albion	46	6	17	23	38	66	−28	35	
24	Doncaster Rovers (R)	46	4	8	34	30	113	−83	20	Relegation to Football Conference

Rules for classification: In the Football League goals scored (GF) takes precedence over goal difference (GD).
(R) Relegated

== Results ==
Doncaster's score comes first

=== Legend ===
Win Draw Loss

=== Football League Third Division ===
Match	Date	Opponent	Venue	Result	Attendance	Scorers
1	9 August 1997	Shrewsbury Town	A	1–2	3,029	Conlon
2	16 August 1997	Peterborough United	H	0–5	1,920	
3	23 August 1997	Macclesfield Town	A	0–3	2,635	
4	30 August 1997	Exeter City	H	0–1	1,186	
5	2 September 1997	Leyton Orient	H	1–4	1,098	Moncrieffe
6	5 September 1997	Mansfield Town	A	1–1	2,874	Moncrieffe
7	13 September 1997	Scunthorpe United	A	1–1	3,378	McDonald
8	20 September 1997	Cambridge United	H	0–0	1,258	
9	27 September 1997	Torquay United	A	0–2	1,650	
10	4 October 1997	Brighton & Hove Albion	H	1–3	2,351	Cunningham
11	11 October 1997	Hartlepool United	H	2–2	1,526	Moncrieffe (2)
12	18 October 1997	Darlington	A	1–5	2,451	Moncrieffe
13	21 October 1997	Colchester United	A	1–2	2,588	McDonald
14	24 October 1997	Swansea City	H	0–3	1,170	
15	1 November 1997	Scarborough	A	0–4	2,345	
16	4 November 1997	Cardiff City	H	1–1	1,004	Moncrieffe
17	8 November 1997	Barnet	A	1–1	2,015	Warren
18	18 November 1997	Lincoln City	A	1–2	2,957	Moncrieffe
19	22 November 1997	Rochdale	H	0–3	1,503	
20	29 November 1997	Hull City	A	0–3	4,721	
21	2 December 1997	Chester City	H	2–1	846	Helliwell, Smith
22	13 December 1997	Notts County	A	2–5	4,024	Pell, Smith
23	19 December 1997	Rotherham United	H	0–3	3,533	
24	28 December 1997	Leyton Orient	A	0–8	4,437	
25	10 January 1998	Shrewsbury Town	H	1–0	1,116	Moncrieffe
26	17 January 1998	Exeter City	A	1–5	4,145	Pemberton
27	27 January 1998	Macclesfield Town	H	0–3	1,707	
28	30 January 1998	Scunthorpe United	A	1–2	2,036	Mike
29	3 February 1998	Mansfield Town	H	0–3	1,538	
30	7 February 1998	Cambridge United	A	1–2	2,478	Wilson
31	10 February 1998	Peterborough United	A	1–0	4,577	Smith
32	14 February 1998	Brighton & Hove Albion	A	0–0	6,339	
33	21 February 1998	Torquay United	H	0–1	1,424	
34	24 February 1998	Darlington	H	0–2	1,342	
35	28 February 1998	Hartlepool United	A	1–3	1,920	Rowe
36	3 March 1998	Barnet	H	0–2	739	
37	10 March 1998	Scarborough	H	1–2	1,129	Rowe
38	14 March 1998	Cardiff City	A	1–7	2,931	Mike
39	21 March 1998	Lincoln City	H	2–4	2,357	George, Donnelly
40	28 March 1998	Rochdale	A	1–4	1,858	Tedaldi
41	4 April 1998	Hull City	H	1–0	2,597	Mike
42	11 April 1998	Chester City	A	1–2	1,593	Mike
43	13 April 1998	Notts County	H	1–2	2,485	Messer
44	18 April 1998	Rotherham United	A	0–3	4,328	
45	25 April 1998	Swansea City	A	0–0	3,661	
46	2 May 1998	Colchester United	H	0–1	3,572	

=== FA Cup ===
Round	Date	Opponent	Venue	Result	Attendance	Scorers
R1	15 November 1997	Preston North End	A	2–3	7,953	Mike, Hammond

=== League Cup ===
Round	Date	Opponent	Venue	Result	Attendance	Scorers
R1 1st Leg	11 August 1997	Nottingham Forest	H	0–8	4,547	
R1 2nd Leg	27 August 1997	Nottingham Forest	A	1–2	9,908	Armstrong (o.g.)

=== Football League Trophy ===
Round	Date	Opponent	Venue	Result	Attendance	Scorers
R1	9 December 1997	Rochdale	H	0–1	580	

== Squad ==
Appearances for competitive matches only

Name	League		FA Cup		League Cup		Football League Trophy		Total	
Name	Apps	Goals	Apps	Goals	Apps	Goals	Apps	Goals	Apps	Goals
(England) Robert Betts	2(1)	0	0	0	0	0	0	0	2(1)	0
(England) John Borg	1	0	0	0	0	0	0	0	1	0
(England) Darren Brookes	9(2)	0	1	0	2	0	0(1)	0	12(3)	0
(England) Ian Clark	1(1)	0	0	0	0	0	0	0	1(1)	0
(England) Paul Conlon	4(10)	1	0	0	0	0	0	0	4(10)	1
(England) Harvey Cunningham	32(1)	1	0	0	1(1)	0	1	0	34(2)	1
(England) Craig Davis	15	0	0	0	0	0	1	0	16	0
(England) Robert Debenham	4(2)	0	0	0	0	0	0	0	4(2)	0
(Scotland) Jim Dobbin	28(3)	0	1	0	0	0	1	0	30(3)	0
(England) Mark Donnelly	8(1)	1	0	0	0	0	0	0	8(1)	1
(England) Wayne Dowell	1	0	0	0	0	0	0	0	1	0
(England) Paul Edwards	5(4)	0	0	0	0	0	0	0	5(4)	0
(England) David Esdaille	9(3)	0	0	0	2	0	0	0	11(3)	0
(England) Darren Esdaille	22(1)	0	0	0	1	0	0	0	23(1)	0
(England) Gary Finley	6(1)	0	0	0	1	0	0	0	7(1)	0
(England) Daniel George	16(2)	1	0	0	0	0	0	0	16(2)	1
(England) Ian Gore	25	0	1	0	2	0	1	0	29	0
(England) Andrew Hammond	1	0	0(1)	1	0	0	0	0	1	1
(England) Steve Hawes	8(3)	0	0	0	0	0	0	0	8(3)	0
(England) Mark Hawthorne	7(1)	0	0	0	0	0	0	0	7(1)	0
(England) Ian Helliwell	8	1	0	0	0	0	1	0	9	1
(England) Maurice Hilton	9(1)	0	1	0	0	0	0	0	10(1)	0
(England) Gary Hoggeth	8	0	0	0	0	0	0	0	8	0
(England) Gary Ingham	10	0	0	0	2	0	0	0	12	0
(England) Simon Ireland	34	0	1	0	1(1)	0	1	0	37(1)	0
(Scotland) Martin McDonald	15	2	1	0	2	0	0	0	18	2
(England) Gary Messer	4(9)	1	0	0	0	0	0	0	4(9)	1
(England) Adie Mike	42	4	1	1	2	0	1	0	46	5
(Jamaica) Prince Moncrieffe	30(8)	8	1	0	2	0	1	0	34(8)	8
(England) Tony Parks	6	0	0	0	0	0	0	0	6	0
(England) Robert Pell	6(4)	1	0	0	0	0	0	0	6(4)	1
(England) Martin Pemberton	24(2)	1	0	0	0(1)	0	0	0	24(3)	1
(England) John Ramsay	2(8)	0	0(1)	0	0(1)	0	0	0	2(10)	0
(England) Zeke Rowe	6	2	0	0	0	0	0	0	6	2
(England) Matt Russell	4(1)	0	0	0	0	0	0	0	4(1)	0
(England) Steve Sanders	19(6)	0	0	0	2	0	1	0	22(6)	0
(England) David Smith	1	0	0	0	0	0	0	0	1	0
(England) Mike Smith	10(10)	3	1	0	1	0	1	0	13(10)	3
(Wales) Dominico Tedaldi	0(2)	1	0	0	0	0	0	0	0(2)	1
(England) Rob Thornley	1	0	0	0	0	0	0	0	1	0
(England) Andy Thorpe	2	0	0	0	0	0	0	0	2	0
(England) Darren Utley	2(2)	0	0	0	0	0	0	0	2(2)	0
(England) Lee Warren	44	1	1	0	1	0	1	0	47	1
(England) Dean Williams	6	0	1	0	0	0	0	0	7	0
(England) Padi Wilson	10	1	0	0	0	0	0	0	10	1
