= History of Scunthorpe United F.C. =

History of an English football club

Chart of table positions of Scunthorpe in the Football League.

Scunthorpe United Football Club is a professional association football club based in the town of Scunthorpe, North Lincolnshire, England. The team compete in the National League North, the sixth level of the English football league system.

The club was formed in 1899 and turned professional after joining the Midland League in 1912. Crowned Midland League champions in the 1926–27 and 1938–39 campaigns, they were elected into the Football League in 1950. They went on to secure promotion as champions of the Third Division North in 1957–58 and spent six seasons in the Second Division, before they were relegated in 1964 and then down to the Fourth Division in 1968. United spent 34 of the next 37 seasons in the basement tier, punctuated by one-season stays in the third tier after they secured promotions in 1971–72, 1982–83 and 1998–99. Brian Laws saw the club promoted out of League Two at the end of the 2004–05 season and his successor, Nigel Adkins, led the club to the League One title in 2006–07. Scunthorpe spent just one season in the Championship, but victory in the 2009 League One play-off final saw the club promoted back into the Championship. They remained in the second tier until two relegations in as many years saw them back into the fourth tier by 2013. Scunthorpe were promoted to League One at the end of the 2013–14 campaign, before being relegated back to League Two in 2019. In 2022, the club was relegated to the National League, ending a 72-year spell in the Football League, and a year later were relegated again, to the National League North.

== History ==
=== Early years: 1899–1958 ===
Scunthorpe United was formed in 1899. In 1910 they merged with local rivals North Lindsey United to become Scunthorpe & Lindsey United and joined the Midland Football League in 1912. After an unsuccessful application to join the Football League in 1921, Scunthorpe & Lindsey won the Midland League in 1926–27 and in 1938–39. When the 1939–40 season came to an abrupt end, due to the outbreak of the Second World War, Scunthorpe & Lindsey finished as runners-up in the second emergency competition, losing 3–2 to Peterborough United in an unofficial play-off game.

After the end of the war, in 1945, Scunthorpe & Lindsey United would re-apply to join the Football League at every opportunity. The club finished as runners-up in the Midland League in 1947–48, and in 1950 was accepted into the Football League, ahead of Workington and Wigan Athletic when the league structure was expanded. The club's first game in Football League Division Three North was against fellow new entrants Shrewsbury Town.

After an unremarkable few years in the Football League, which included the club's first-ever third and fourth-round FA Cup ties (against Tottenham Hotspur and Portsmouth respectively), the "& Lindsey" was dropped from the club's name in 1958.

=== The Second Division years: 1958–1964 ===
In 1958 Scunthorpe United won promotion to the Second Division as champions of the Third Division North under the guidance of manager Ron Suart. The Iron then began a steady rise through the Second Division over the next four years under a variety of managers, improving its league position each season until reaching fourth place at the close of the 1961–1962 season, the club's highest league position to date. This was despite the sale of its leading marksman Barrie Thomas to Newcastle United for a reported £40,000.

The year 1962 proved to be a turning point in the fortunes of the club, and in 1964 they finished bottom of the Second Division and were relegated to the now national Third Division. At the same time Scunthorpe United stalwart Jack Brownsword retired after 597 Football League appearances for the club, and Freddie Goodwin replaced Dick Duckworth as the club's manager.

=== Decline and stagnation: 1964–1987 ===
After relegation from Division Two, the Iron spent the next four years bouncing around in the Third Division. Freddie Goodwin left the club during the 1967–68 season, however his replacement Ron Ashman was unable to save the club from relegation to Division Four at the end of the season. A slight resurgence occurred in the very early 70s, with the Iron first defeating top-flight Sheffield Wednesday in the FA Cup during January 1970, and then gaining promotion back to the Third Division in 1972. It was during this short period that a young Kevin Keegan was discovered and developed by Ashman before being sold to Liverpool in 1971 for £35,000, having racked up 124 appearances and 18 goals for Scunthorpe.

The Iron were unable to cement a place in the Third Division, and relegation back to the Fourth Division followed immediately in 1973. At the same time, Ron Ashman departed to manage local rivals Grimsby Town, only to return during 1976. The period between his two tenures saw several management changes and a disastrous league campaign which saw the Iron finish rock bottom of the Football League in 1975. In 1980, cricketer Ian Botham was signed as a player for Scunthorpe by Ron Ashman. Botham played for the club until 1984 making 14 appearances. He was also a regular in the Central League for Scunthorpe United Reserves, once scoring a hat-trick against Blackpool at the Old Show Ground. But the next five years saw United stagnate in the bottom half of Division Four, with the club finishing second-bottom at the end of the 1981–82 campaign. Promotion to Division Three was achieved under manager John Duncan in 1983, but immediate relegation was to follow under his successor Allan Clarke in 1984, with United then entering a further period of stagnation in the middle of the Fourth Division table.

=== New home, new horizons: 1987–1997 ===
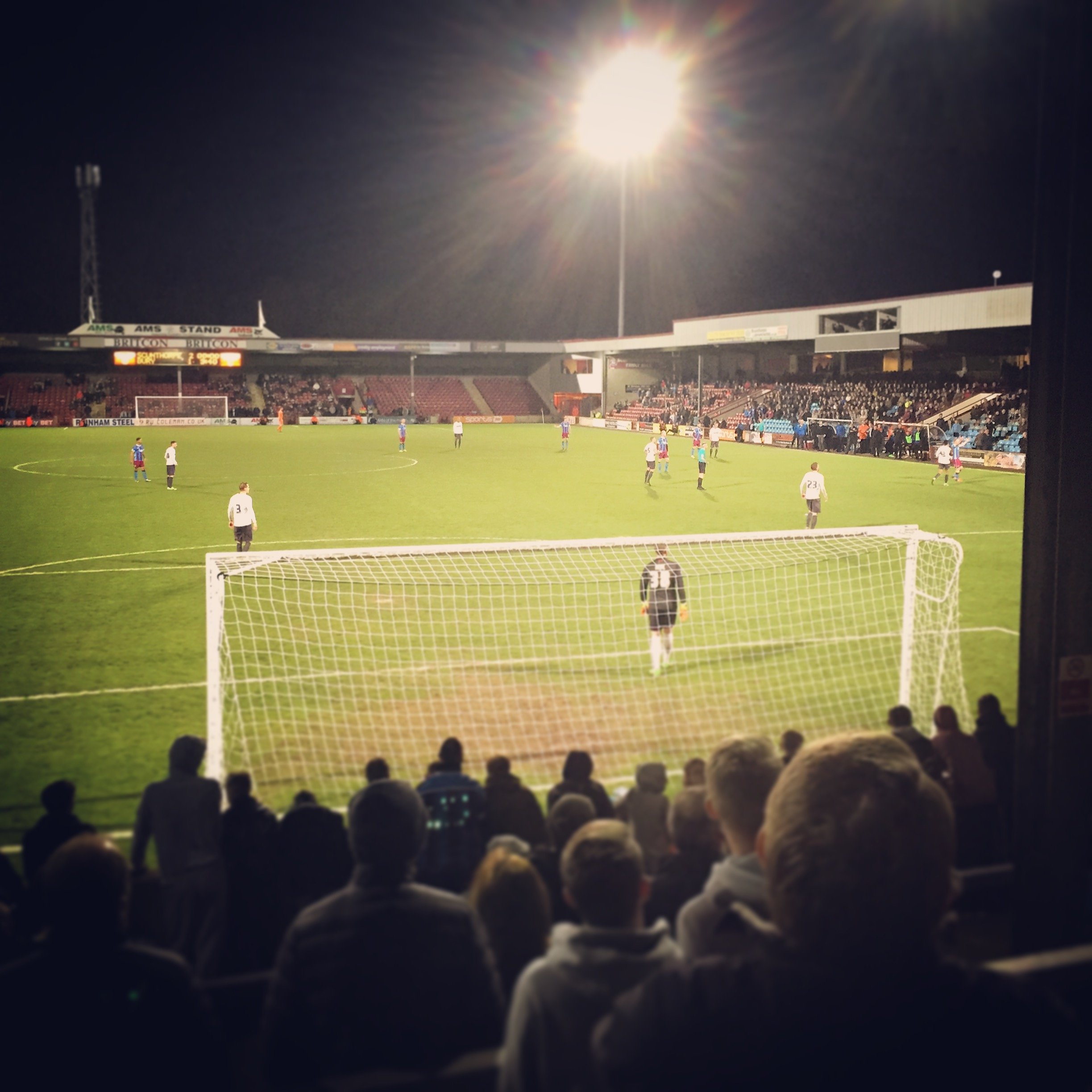
Glanford Park as seen from the Britcon stand

In 1988 Scunthorpe United became the first English football club in the modern era to move to a new, purpose-built stadium, Glanford Park. Whilst preparations for the new ground were underway, the club's final season at the Old Show Ground very nearly yielded success. Under the management of Mick Buxton, United qualified for the Division Four play-offs. Ultimately this was not to be, with the Iron losing 2–3 on aggregate to Torquay United in the semi-final. The second leg of this semi-final was to be the last game played at the Old Show Ground, with Steve Lister being the last player to score at the ground.

The club's first season at Glanford Park ended in another play-off semi-final heartbreak, this time losing out 1–5 on aggregate to Wrexham. Further playoff failure occurred in 1991 as the Iron lost out to Blackpool 2–3 (on aggregate) in the semi-final under Buxton's replacement Bill Green. Finally, in 1992 the club made it to the Fourth Division play-off final at Wembley, losing out eventually on a penalty shootout to Blackpool by 4 goals to 3 (see here). This was the club's first-ever appearance at Wembley.

The following four seasons saw United sit consistently in the middle of the now Third Division table under a succession of managers, namely Richard Money and David Moore. Mick Buxton made a surprise return to the club as manager following Moore's sacking in 1996.

=== The Brian Laws era: 1997–2006 ===
In February 1997, following the end of Mick Buxton's second spell in charge of Scunthorpe United, Brian Laws, one of Buxton's signings to the club as a player, was appointed manager, with Mark Lillis (another Buxton signing) as his assistant. In 1997–98, his first full season in charge, the Iron finished one point outside the play-offs. The following season, the club finished fourth in Division Three. This ensured qualification for the play-offs, which they won after a 3–2 aggregate win in the semi-finals over Swansea City and a 1–0 win over Leyton Orient in the final at Wembley with an early goal from Alex Calvo-Garcia. They were unable to maintain their Division Two status the following season however, and were relegated after finishing in 23rd place.

Laws guided the Iron to their second play-off position finish under his management during the 2002–03 season, with the club finishing in 5th place. Scunthorpe were ultimately denied by their county rivals Lincoln City however, losing the semi-finals 6–3 on aggregate.

On 25 March 2004, following a 2–3 home defeat to Carlisle United two days previously, Laws was sacked from his position as Scunthorpe United manager after a poor run of results saw the Iron sitting just 6 points above the Division Three relegation zone. Assistant manager Russ Wilcox was given the job of caretaker manager, with his first game in charge being a 1–1 draw at home to Leyton Orient. Exactly three weeks later on 15 April 2004, it was announced that Laws had been reinstated as the manager of the Iron after a boardroom shake-up. With only four games of the season left, Laws was tasked with preventing the Iron's relegation from the Football League. Despite three of these four games ending in defeat, results elsewhere swung in the Iron's favour, with the club eventually avoiding the drop to the Conference National by four points, finishing 22nd.

Laws remained with the Iron for the 2004–05 season, which Scunthorpe started in the newly rebranded Football League Two. This gamble ultimately paid off, with the Iron gaining promotion to Football League One as runners up. This was the first time that a Scunthorpe side had obtained automatic promotion in 22 years. Another highlight of this season came with the Iron leading Chelsea, the Premiership champions, 0–1, in the FA Cup third round at Stamford Bridge thanks to an 8th minute Paul Hayes goal. Scunthorpe were ultimately denied, eventually going down 3–1.

In the 2005–06 season, the club secured a mid-table League One finish, marking the first time that the Iron had managed to avoid immediate relegation following a promotion since 1958. Young strikers Billy Sharp and Andy Keogh established themselves as the first-choice strike partnership, and scored 38 goals between them. Again the club led away in the FA Cup third round at a Premier League club – this time, Manchester City – before eventually losing 3–1.

After a successful start to the 2006–07 season, Laws was offered the job of manager at Sheffield Wednesday, which he accepted, ending almost a decade in charge of the Iron.

=== Into the Championship: 2006–2011 ===
Following Laws' departure, physiotherapist Nigel Adkins was put in temporary charge. After obtaining good results, his role was made permanent. Fans responded with the chant: "Who needs Mourinho, we've got our physio." Despite selling Keogh to Wolverhampton Wanderers in the January transfer window, the club went on to win League One and promotion to the Championship that season, in the process setting a club record 16-match unbeaten run and accumulating 91 points. Billy Sharp was the leading goalscorer in the top four divisions, netting 30.

Billy Sharp was sold to Sheffield United before the start of the following season for a then-club record £2 million. Despite his ostensible replacement, Martin Paterson, scoring 13 league goals, Scunthorpe were unable to cement their place in the second tier, and were relegated in 23rd place. Paterson was sold to Burnley at the end of the season for £1.6m.

The 2008–09 season saw Scunthorpe reach Wembley twice. The Iron qualified for the Football League Trophy final, but were beaten 3–2 after extra time by Luton Town. The club then qualified for the League One play-offs through an 88th-minute equaliser by club captain Cliff Byrne against promotion rivals Tranmere Rovers on the last day of the regular season. Scunthorpe beat MK Dons on penalties after a 1–1 aggregate draw in the semi-finals, before beating Millwall in the Wembley final 3–2, with two goals from Matt Sparrow and one from Martyn Woolford, to achieve promotion back to the Championship at the first time of asking.

In 2009–10, the Iron managed to retain their second-tier status, a feat no Scunthorpe side had achieved since 1963. The campaign included a 2–1 home win over eventual champions, Newcastle United, Scunthorpe's first appearance on UK terrestrial television in the FA Cup third-round 4–2 home defeat to Manchester City, and Gary Hooper as the club's top scorer (and the Championship's third-highest) with 19 goals; he was sold to Scottish club Celtic at the end of the season for £2.4 million.

Seven games into the 2010–11 season, Nigel Adkins left Scunthorpe to become Southampton's manager. Coach and former player Ian Baraclough was appointed as his replacement, but he was sacked half a year later after a slide into the relegation zone. Former Scunthorpe defender Alan Knill was appointed from Bury with eight games of the season remaining, but was unable to prevent the Iron from finishing bottom and returning to League One.

=== The final Football League years: 2011–2022 ===
Although Scunthorpe had been hopeful of bouncing back to the Championship, the club endured a difficult first half of the 2011–12 season, just above the relegation zone at New Year and knocked out in the first round of the FA Cup by League Two's AFC Wimbledon (although they did take Premier League Newcastle United to extra time in the League Cup). They fared somewhat better in the second half of the season, embarking on a ten-match unbeaten run. They finished the season in 18th place with 52 points.

The 2012–13 league season started poorly for Scunthorpe, but in the first round of the League Cup the club drew 5–5 with Derby County and won 7–6 on penalties. By 27 October they had just two league wins. On 29 October 2012 Alan Knill was sacked as Scunthorpe manager, after a 3–0 defeat by MK Dons left the club 22nd in League One. On the same day it was confirmed that ex-United boss Brian Laws would return after a six-year absence, along with former assistant manager Russ Wilcox. Laws' first game in charge was a 4–0 defeat to Gillingham in the FA Cup, but this was followed by consecutive away wins against Walsall and Coventry City in the league. Ultimately, however, Laws was unable to stop the club's slide back into League Two, with relegation confirmed on the last day of the season despite a 3–1 home victory over Swindon Town. At the end of the 2012–13 season, the then chairman Steve Wharton stepped down from his position with immediate effect. Businessman Peter Swann was appointed as his successor on 24 May 2013.

During the 2013–14 season in League Two, on 20 November 2013 following a 2–1 home defeat to local rivals Grimsby Town in the FA Cup, Laws was sacked after a run of five games without a win. Wilcox took over as manager around halfway through the season, and after a 28-game unbeaten run, ending in a 2–0 defeat to Exeter City, which broke the all-time football league record, Scunthorpe achieved instant promotion back to League One. Russ Wilcox was the LMA League Two Manager of the Season while forward Sam Winnall picked up the Golden Boot for his 23 goals. Wilcox also picked up a special merit award from Sir Alex Ferguson for his unbeaten start as manager.

Despite these accolades, Wilcox could not sustain momentum into the following season and was sacked on 8 October 2014, with the club 23rd in League One, to be replaced by Mark Robins on 13 October. The change proved successful with the club finishing 16th, six points clear of relegation. The 2014–15 season also saw the Iron involved in a then record-breaking penalty shootout against non-league Worcester City in the FA Cup 2nd round replay, with 32 penalties taken. Despite this dramatic advance to the third round, the club bowed out in a disappointing fashion, going down 0–2 to Chesterfield in a third round replay.

Although Robins had saved the club from relegation during the 2014–15 season, the club's performances during the first half of the 2015–16 season were disappointing and inconsistent. On 18 January 2016, Robins was sacked after a 5–0 away defeat to Blackpool. Nick Daws and Andy Dawson were placed in temporary charge of the club, with their first game (a 3–0 home win over Colchester United) coming on 23 January. A spell of positive results followed, and on 22 February it was announced that Daws had been installed as manager until the end of the season, with Dawson as his assistant.

Just over a month after the appointment of Daws and Dawson, Graham Alexander was appointed as the club's new manager on 22 March 2016. Alexander's first game in charge was a 0–0 draw away to Barnsley on 25 March, followed by an emphatic 6–0 home victory over Swindon Town a week later. Alexander continued the revival of Scunthorpe's season which had begun following Robins' departure. The club mounted a late charge towards the League One play-off positions, narrowly missing out to Barnsley on goal difference, finishing the season in seventh place with 74 points.

Under Alexander, the Iron won six of their first ten games in the 2016–17 season and were top of League One from 17 September, after a 0–1 away win at Shrewsbury Town, to 31 December, when a 2–1 away defeat to Bolton Wanderers saw the Iron drop to third. This run also saw United go a calendar year unbeaten at home after a 3–0 victory over Millwall on 17 December 2016 (the Iron's previous home defeat was on 19 December 2015 by Sheffield United). Despite climbing back to the top of the table in January, a dramatic slump in form saw Scunthorpe fail to win through February; the club was fifth in early March 2017. However, an upturn in the club's home form saw a 2–1 victory over Rochdale on 14 March thanks to a late Matt Crooks strike, and on 14 April the club recorded its first away victory since January with a 0–1 win over MK Dons. The side then won its last five games of the regular season, enough for the Iron to finish third with 82 points, having never been outside the top six during the season. Following the third-place finish, the Iron were drawn against sixth-placed Millwall in the play-off semi-final. The first leg ended 0–0, then the Iron suffered a 2–3 home defeat in the second leg, despite having first taken the lead.

In the 2017–18 season, the Iron recorded their first league win three games into the regular season with a 1–0 win over Oxford United. United climbed into the top six of League One with a 0–4 away victory at Plymouth Argyle on 26 August 2017. The club remained in a play-off spot for most of the season, but a disastrous run of form in February and March jeopardised the Iron's play-off hopes. On 24 March 2018, the club was 5th in League One but without a victory in eight games following a 1–1 home draw against Rochdale, and Graham Alexander was sacked as manager. Nick Daws and Andy Dawson were reappointed caretaker manager and assistant respectively but the Iron won neither of their next two games and slipped to 9th. A 0–1 away victory at fellow play-off hopefuls Charlton Athletic was followed by three consecutive wins, with United securing their play-off position on 1 May 2018 with a 2–0 home win over Plymouth Argyle. Scunthorpe finished the season in 5th place and were drawn against Rotherham United in the play-off semi-finals. Despite holding the Millers to a 2–2 draw in the first leg at Glanford Park, Scunthorpe were again denied a trip to Wembley with a 2–0 defeat in the second leg.

Until 2018, the club had been considered one of the most financially prudent in English football, being one of only three in the top four divisions to be debt-free. In October 2018, it was revealed that a £2 million loan from the outgoing chairman Steven Wharton was helping to keep the club financially stable.

Stuart McCall was appointed manager on 27 August 2018, but despite a January sequence of four wins out of five games that earned him the January 2019 League One Manager of the Month award, the Iron dropped to 18th and McCall was sacked in March 2019; Andy Dawson was again put in temporary charge until the end of the season. The team took only two points from their remaining seven games, ending four points short of safety, and were relegated in 23rd position. Former boss of rivals Grimsby, Paul Hurst, was appointed as first team manager on 13 May 2019, nine days after the season's end. On 30 July 2019, the club signed a stadium naming-rights deal; Glanford Park was renamed The Sands Venue Stadium for the 2019–20 EFL League Two season. On 29 January 2020, Hurst was sacked with Scunthorpe in 16th place, with Russ Wilcox returning as caretaker manager until the end of the season. Due to COVID-19 impacts, the 2019–20 season was terminated early and decided on a points per game basis, placing Scunthorpe 20th. During pre-season, Neil Cox was appointed as the permanent manager. In 2020–21, the majority of fixtures were played behind closed doors; Scunthorpe finished 22nd, after not winning any of their final ten fixtures, avoiding relegation by three points.

After a disappointing start to the 2021–22 season, Cox was sacked on 1 November 2021 with his side sitting bottom of the Football League with just eleven points from the first 15 matches. On 5 November 2021, Keith Hill was appointed as Cox's successor. On 31 March 2022, with the Iron bottom of League Two and 10 points from safety, chairman Peter Swann announced his resignation with immediate effect. The club said that Lee Turnbull would take over Swann's duties. On 15 April 2022, Scunthorpe lost 3–0 at Leyton Orient and were relegated from League Two, ending a 72-year spell in the Football League. The club's final league game was a 7–0 hammering away at Bristol Rovers, leaving the Iron bottom of the table with just 26 points. Manager Keith Hill said he wanted to get the club back into the Football League but a change in its "terrible" culture was needed. The club released ten players following relegation.

=== Non-League: 2022–present ===
Scunthorpe United won their first match in the National League, beating Yeovil Town 2–1, but then lost the next five. On 30 August 2022, Hill was sacked. The club was second from bottom of the league and had won three times and lost 27 out of 39 matches under him. On 14 September 2022, the club was reported to be "in genuine danger of entering administration" after a proposed takeover deal collapsed, though Peter Swann, the club's owner, said he was "not going down that route". Tony Daws was appointed interim manager pending completion of a takeover at the club, overseeing a six-game unbeaten run in the league at the start of his tenure, but by mid November, following a home defeat to fellow strugglers Maidstone United, Scunthorpe were 22nd, third from bottom of the National League. Daws stepped down as interim manager on 28 November 2022, resuming his role as academy manager. Interim assistant manager, Michael Nelson, became interim manager, with support from goalkeeping coach, Paul Musselwhite, and acting COO, Lee Turnbull.

In late November 2022, a takeover bid headed by a London consortium failed to due a lack of proof of funds. However, following reports of missed wage payments, it was announced on 1 December 2022 that a local consortium, headed by ex-director Simon Elliot and Scunthorpe-born entrepreneur Ian Sharp, had agreed to buy the club. Swann said the missed wage payments were the reason why the sale happened when it did. With the takeover yet to be completed and the club at the bottom of the National League, on 11 January 2023, the club were served with a winding-up petition over an unpaid tax bill. On 14 January 2023, United fans invaded the pitch during the second half of their 2–0 National League defeat by Woking, in a protest against Swann (also involved in separate court action regarding gambling debts) while another consortium, led by former Notts County owner Alan Hardy, was reported to be interested in a takeover. On 19 January 2023, two potential buyers – a group including former Port Vale owner Norman Smurthwaite, and the local Elliot/Sharp consortium – pulled out of takeover bids, while Hardy had submitted a final bid for the club, its debts and Glanford Park.

On 25 January 2023, the club announced the immediate takeover of the club by former Ilkeston Town chairman David Hilton, and won their first away game for over a year, securing a 1–0 victory at Halifax Town. On 29 January 2023, Peterborough Sports manager Jimmy Dean was appointed Iron manager, with Nelson staying on as head coach. Hilton settled the club's HMRC tax debt, spelling the end of the transfer embargo, and the club signed six new players, but the club still suffered their ninth home league defeat of the season, beaten 3–1 by Barnet on 3 February 2023 to stay 23rd in the National League. In April 2023, Hilton announced that, to cut costs, the club would be closing its academy and training 70 miles (110 km) away in Ilkeston, but fan feedback led to the latter decision being reversed – players would continue to train at Glanford Park, but the academy closure and some staff redundancies would go ahead. On 10 April 2023, with a 2–0 loss to Oldham Athletic, the side were relegated, for the second successive season, to the National League North.

In September 2023, Hilton put the club up for sale. The move followed publication of an article in The Athletic detailing past fraud offences and prison sentences served by him. On 28 September 2023, Hilton reportedly withdrew the club's funding, and the club said that, after its 7 October league game against Brackley, future fixtures would be played at Gainsborough Trinity's home ground, The Northolme, due to a land dispute with Glanford Park's owner, Coolsilk (owned by Peter Swann). Gainsborough, however, said Scunthorpe's statement was issued without their knowledge or consent. HMRC was also set to issue a winding-up petition against Scunthorpe United.

On 4 October 2023, the club was sold to local businesswoman Michelle Harness. Tahina Akther, a local born Barrister, crafted a deal that enabled The New Show Ground Community Interest Company, a not for profit entity, to purchase Glanford Park. By utilising a CIC structure it ensured that Glanford Park is now "asset locked" and is for the benefit of the community going forward. The purchase was completed on 29 November. As part of the deal the local council also purchased the surrounding land including the training fields and car parks for development.

They finished their first season in the sixth tier as runners-up but lost on penalties in the play-off semi-final to Boston United. A year later, at the end of the 2024–25 season, the club earned promotion back to the National League at the second time of asking, defeating Chester 2–1 in the play-off final having finished second in the regular season.
