= Richard Money =

English football player and manager (born 1955)

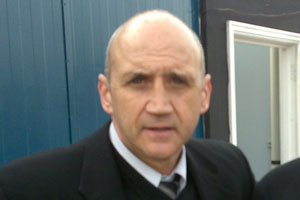
- Money in 2007

Personal information
- Full name: Richard Money
- Date of birth: 13 October 1955 (age 71)
- Place of birth: Lowestoft, England
- Height: 5 ft 11 in (1.80 m)
- Position: Defender

Youth career
- Ipswich Town

Senior career*
Years	Team	Apps	(Gls)
1972–1973	Lowestoft Town		
1973–1977	Scunthorpe United	173	(4)
1977–1980	Fulham	106	(3)
1980–1982	Liverpool	14	(0)
1981	→ Derby County (loan)	5	(0)
1982–1983	Luton Town	44	(1)
1983–1985	Portsmouth	17	(0)
1985–1990	Scunthorpe United	106	(0)
Total		465	(8)

International career
1979	England B	1	(0)

Managerial career
- 1987: Scunthorpe United (Caretaker)
- 1993–1994: Scunthorpe United
- 2003–2004: AIK
- 2004–2005: Västerås SK
- 2005–2006: Newcastle Jets
- 2006–2008: Walsall
- 2009–2011: Luton Town
- 2012–2015: Cambridge United
- 2017: Solihull Moors
- 2018–2019: Hartlepool United
- * Club domestic league appearances and goals

Richard Money (born 13 October 1955) is an English former footballer and manager who was most recently manager of National League club Hartlepool United. Before this, he managed Cambridge United, overseeing the side's return to the Football League after a nine-year absence. Money was dismissed by Cambridge in November 2015.

== Playing career ==
Born in Lowestoft, Suffolk, Money grew up a Norwich City fan. After captaining Lowestoft and Suffolk Boys as a youngster, he joined Ipswich Town as an associate schoolboy when he was 14. The 90-mile return journey between home and Portman Road proved difficult however, leading to Money not being retained by the Tractor Boys when he left school.

Money joined local Eastern Counties Football League side Lowestoft Town, where despite only turning 17 two months into the season, he quickly became a star for the Suffolk outfit. Scunthorpe United's then-management duo of Ron Ashman and Ron Bradley, had both played for Norwich City and had lots of contacts across East Anglia, leading to them being recommended Money by local scout Jack Harper. Bradley later scouted Money in-person during a cup match between Lowestoft and Norwich City, leading to Scunthorpe offering Money professional terms at the end of the 1972-73 season.

News of Scunthorpe's offer reignited Ipswich's interest in their former associate schoolboy; but Money elected to reject The Tractor Boys' offer of apprenticeship terms - instead turning professional with Scunthorpe. The Iron and manager Ron Ashman did however, strike a gentleman's agreement with then-Ipswich manager Sir Bobby Robson to offer the club first-refusal should they ever sell Money on.

The teenage Money was an immediate hit in Lincolnshire, making 32 appearances in his debut season at the Old Showground, including making his league debut and scoring his first professional goal when he was still 17. Despite Scunthorpe having finished rock-bottom of the Fourth Division in 1974–75, Money's unusually athletic and ball-playing style of play saw him extensively linked with a move away from the club.

This included Brian Clough allegedly attempting to 'tap up' Money in the Old Showground's dressing rooms during Scunthorpe's 1-0 victory over local rivals Doncaster Rovers in April 1976, after Money had been sent off. Clough's Nottingham Forest later formally requested to take Money on a month's loan, with a view to permanently signing him, but Scunthorpe manager Ashman refused, later citing his concern that Money's confidence could be damaged, or be harder to sell, if the loan spell was unsuccessful. Money later admitted that he was "distraught" at the decision and "fell out with Ron big time over it."

Despite the move to Forest falling through, many suitors remained interested in the defender and in November 1977 - Scunthorpe accepted Fulham's £50,000 offer. This was a then-club record sale for Scunthorpe and also included a 10 per cent cut of any profit Fulham made in the future by selling Money on.

During his time in West London, Money received four call-ups to the England under-21 squad, gained one England B cap in a game against New Zealand, before eventually making 106 league appearances for the Cottagers.

Money again attracted a number of suitors whilst at Craven Cottage, before eventually signing for Bob Paisley's Liverpool on 1 May 1980. for £350,000; with Scunthorpe gaining a £30,000 slice of Fulham's £300,000 profit.

During his time on Merseyside, Money grew particularly close to club icon Kenny Dalglish, who is the godfather of Money's son. Money made his debut for The Reds against West Brom on 13 September 1980, before going on to make 17 appearances in his first season at the club; including in both the League Cup and European Cup semi-final second legs.

Following Alan Kennedy breaking his wrist in the first leg at Anfield, Money starred in the second leg away at Bayern Munich in the unfamiliar role of left-back. Defying their huge underdog status after the first-leg 0–0 draw, Liverpool progressed to the European Cup final on away goals thanks to a 1–1 draw, with Money's performance drawing public praise from Real Madrid winger Laurie Cunningham. This would prove to be the highlight of Money's career at Liverpool however, as he was later an unused substitute for the final, saying: "There was a break before the final and I knew Alan (Kennedy) would be fit. I genuinely felt in my own mind that Alan would play. I'd never thought of it as anything other than a foregone conclusion that he'd back."

However, after Liverpool's signing of Mark Lawrenson from Brighton that summer, Money fell down the pecking order at Anfield and did not make any appearances for Liverpool the following season. In pursuit of first-team football, he engineered a loan move to Derby in late 1981, before eventually joining Luton Town permanently for £100,000 in March 1982. Admitting, that he "lost patience too quickly", Money has since expressed regret regarding his departure from Liverpool, saying: "I look back now and you should never leave Liverpool until you're kicked out. I wasn't, but I wanted to play, so decided to leave."

Managed by David Pleat, Luton won promotion to the First Division in the remainder of their 1981–82 campaign, before they duly survived in the top-flight the following season. Money made 44 league appearances and scored one goal for the Hatters, but in August 1983 he was reunited with his previous Fulham manager Bobby Campbell, who was now in charge of Portsmouth.

Money had terrible injury luck at Fratton Park, with two cruciate operations meaning he was only able to make 17 league appearances before rejoining Scunthorpe United in October 1985. Despite initially signing as a player-coach, Money swiftly became an instrumental part of Scunthorpe's defence, overcoming injuries to play a combined 80 games in all competitions for the club across their 1985–86 and 1986–87 Fourth Division campaigns.

Following the departure of manager Frank Barlow in March 1987, Money was appointed caretaker player-manager, aged just 31. He later admitted that "I wasn't ready" for the role, adding: "I had good support from Bill Green, but it was tough. I certainly didn't know how to handle the directors at that time. I also found it difficult picking a team with me in it."

With the appointment of Mick Buxton as manager in April 1987, Scunthorpe came close to automatic promotion in the 1987–88 and 1988–89 Fourth Division seasons, but lost in the play-offs on both occasions. Highlighting Andy Flounders, Tony Daws, Kevin 'Ticker' Taylor and Ron Green as particularly talented team-mates during this time, when asked if the team was good enough to get promoted, Money admitted: "Yes, definitely. We should have gone up automatically."

Owing to consistent injury problems, Money retired from playing after making just two appearances in Scunthorpe's following 1988–89 campaign, to focus solely on his coaching role at the club.

== Coaching career ==
After returning to Scunthorpe 1985, and for the duration of his second spell as a player, Money combined his playing with his role as a youth development coach. He later remembered: "There were some tough days. I coached the schoolboys in the evening, and, when I trained with the first team in the morning, I'd take (the schoolboys) in the morning, go and report and then play (for the first team) in the afternoon. That's how it was in those days. You did all sorts."

During this time, Money was also responsible for Scunthorpe's 1988 youth intake of Graham Alexander, Richard Hall and Neil Cox. This is the only time in the club's history that three academy graduates from the same year have all gone on to play in the top flight, whilst Alexander and Cox also both later returned to manage the club.

Money later left the club to take up a Youth Coach role at Aston Villa, working under first-team managers Graham Taylor, Jozef Vengloš and Ron Atkinson. In January 1993 however, he joined Scunthorpe for a third time - this time succeeding his previous mentor Bill Green as first-team manager.

He was in charge of The Iron for exactly 70 games in all competitions; of which they won 23, drew 24 and lost 23. Despite highlights including a strong start to the club's 1993–94 Division Three campaign and a 7-0 victory over Northampton, the club suffered from the sales of top-goalscorer Ian Helliwell and star centre-half Matt Elliott and Money later confessed that he should not have taken the job. "The fact that Tom Belton (the club chairman) was a good family friend made it difficult to have tough conversations. Going back for the third time was a mistake. I thought taking Scunthorpe as my first job was the right thing to do, but it wasn't. There was too much familiarity."

Money eventually left the club for a third and final time in March 1994 however, after movement in the boardroom. "It was driven by me" he said. "The reason I left was because Tom (Belton) was ousted. I found it very difficult to have a relationship with someone knowing that Tom was no longer chairman. That sense of loyalty to Tom was really difficult to deal with. I agreed to part pretty quickly. I didn't dislike anyone who took over. But I just didn't feel right."

After leaving Scunthorpe, he went on to become a coach at Nottingham Forest during their successful return to the premiership and Europe in the 1990s before leaving with manager Frank Clark to coach at Manchester City. He also had very successful spells as both Academy Director and First Team Coach at Coventry City. He built up extensive experience in management and coaching in Sweden, as manager of successful club AIK, gaining experience of coaching in the UEFA Cup, and then at Västerås SK, saving them from certain relegation. He then coached in Australia with Newcastle United Jets in the newly formed A-League, leading the club to a fourth-place finish and a place in the Grand final series.

Money returned to England to become manager of Walsall in May 2006, signing a two-year contract. He guided Walsall to the League Two title in the 2006–07 season, with the club conceding just 34 goals over 46 games, which led to the Saddlers faithful coining his eponymous 'Dickie Dosh' nickname. He was then linked with the vacant managerial position at local rivals Coventry City in February 2008.

Money resigned from Walsall on 22 April 2008, after it was confirmed the club could not reach the League One play-offs.

On 24 June 2008, it was confirmed that Money would become Newcastle United's Academy Director.

On 30 October 2009, Money was announced as manager of Conference Premier side Luton Town, the club he had played for in the 1982–83 season. After a run of games in March 2010 where Luton won seven out of eight games, scoring twenty-seven goals, Money was given the Conference Manager of the Month award. Luton finished the season in second place, losing to York City in the play-off semi-final. In August 2010 Money apologised to Luton supporters for confronting them over criticism and abuse of his players. He later released a statement apologising to the club and supporters. He was replaced six months later by his assistant Gary Brabin on 28 March 2011. He left the club third in the league and with the most successful win ratio of any Luton Town manager.

Touching on his time at Luton and supporters' abuse of midfielder Pavel Besta however, Money later stated: "There's a clue in the word 'supporter', in that you 'support'. I know in my own heart of hearts that I haven't handled that as well as I should have. I've always been very pro-player, but to a degree this got me into trouble at times. I think people who know me and have worked with me would say that I'm a pretty good guy in the main: very supportive of people, very open, giving people an opportunity to have their say, very inclusive. But I don't think that's the view on some of the terraces where I've managed, which is a shame. I think I'd do quite a few things differently."

On 4 October 2012, Money joined Cambridge United as head coach, with the then current manager, Jez George, returning to his role as Director of Football. Cambridge finished 14th at the end of the 2012–13 campaign before undertaking a significant rebuild of the squad. A host of players arrived in readiness for the new campaign, Money's first full season in charge, and Cambridge were unbeaten after the first 16 games of the Conference season. Though that run was eventually ended by Southport, Cambridge remained in the top two for the remainder of the season – winning the FA Trophy along the way. Money then led the club to promotion via the play-offs, a 2–1 victory over Gateshead at Wembley securing a return to the Football League after a nine-year absence.

Money then guided his newly promoted Cambridge side to a replay against Manchester United in the FA Cup Fourth Round at Old Trafford in January 2015. On 11 May 2015 Money signed a new 3-year contract with Cambridge - prolonging his stay until 2018, and officially giving him the title of manager, rather than head coach. Money was sacked as manager on 2 November 2015, and he later admitted that: "It was a real blow to leave. I enjoyed Cambridge so much. It's a great city and we were successful."

On 16 April 2016, Money was announced as the Atlanta United Academy Director.

On 14 December 2016, Money was announced as the Norwich City Academy Director.

On 15 August 2017, Norwich City announced that Money had left the Club by mutual consent. Money stating the recent club overhaul and his own desire to return to management as reasons for his departure.

On 5 October 2017, he was appointed manager of Solihull Moors with the club 23rd in the National League and four points from safety, but resigned after 26 days, with the club bottom of the league.

On 11 December 2018, Money was appointed as the new manager of Hartlepool United. It was later announced on 23 January 2019 that Money was to take a senior role overseeing football matters strategically and that first team duties were to be passed onto the club's director of football and former manager, Craig Hignett. After just five days in the role, Money departed the club after being verbally abused in a fish and chip shop.

== Managerial statistics ==
Competitive matches only. Correct as of match played 19 January 2019.

Team	Nat	From	To	Record				
Team	Nat	From	To	P	W	D	L	Win %
Scunthorpe United	(England)	6 January 1993	31 July 1994	70	23	24	23	32.86
AIK	(Sweden)	1 January 2003	19 April 2004	37	16	13	8	43.24
Västerås SK	(Sweden)	25 May 2004	31 October 2004	24	11	6	7	45.83
Newcastle Jets	(Australia)	23 August 2005	2 May 2006	27	9	7	11	33.33
Walsall	(England)	3 May 2006	22 April 2008	103	44	33	26	42.72
Luton Town	(England)	30 October 2009	28 March 2011	84	46	21	17	54.76
Cambridge United	(England)	4 October 2012	2 November 2015	170	67	45	58	39.41
Solihull Moors	(England)	5 October 2017	31 October 2017	6	2	1	3	33.33
Hartlepool United	(England)	11 December 2018	23 January 2019	8	2	2	4	25.00
Total				492	204	139	149	41.46

== Honours ==
=== Player ===
Liverpool

- European Cup: 1980–81

=== Manager ===
Walsall

- Football League Two: 2006–07

Cambridge United

- Football Conference play-offs: 2014
- FA Trophy: 2013–14

Individual

- Football League Two Manager of the Month: November 2006
- Football Conference Manager of the Year: 2013–14
