= Jamie Murphy (footballer, born 1973) =

English footballer and physiotherapist

Personal information
- Date of birth: 25 February 1973 (age 53)
- Place of birth: Manchester, England
- Position: Defender

Senior career*
Years	Team	Apps	(Gls)
1990–1995	Blackpool	77	(4)
1995–1997	Doncaster Rovers	25	(1)
1997	Cambridge United	0	(0)
1997–2000	Halifax Town	83	(4)
2000–2004	Morecambe	91	(3)
2004–2005	Lancaster City		
Total		276	(12)
- * Club domestic league appearances and goals

Jamie Murphy (born 25 February 1973) is an English physiotherapist and former professional footballer. He played as a left-back.

Manchester-born Murphy began his career at Blackpool in 1990, where he was mainly a deputy to Mitch Cook. In five years at Bloomfield Road, the defender made 77 league appearances and scored four goals. He appeared as a substitute for Mike Davies in Blackpool's Division Four play-off final victory against Scunthorpe United on 23 May 1992 at Wembley.

In 1995, Murphy was released by Seasiders' manager Sam Allardyce. He joined Doncaster Rovers, with whom he remained for two years.

His next stop was Cambridge United. He signed a rolling contract with the U's, but left the club after only three months.

In November 1997 Murphy signed for Halifax Town. He made 83 appearances and scored four goals for the Shaymen in three years.

Murphy returned to Lancashire in 2000 to join Morecambe, where he played alongside ex-Blackpool teammate Steve McIlhargey. He left the Shrimps in 2004 and finished his career with neighbours Lancaster City.

Murphy then went on to do his physiotherapy degree and gained a First class honours at the University of Salford and worked for Bolton Wanderers from 2004 until 2007. He then joined Newcastle United, where he worked as a fitness coach and/or physio.

Murphy was later to return to his hometown of Manchester. He became a Manchester City physio during the time of Mark Hughes' management and later became head physio; however, during the second season of Roberto Mancini's management he stopped being seen acting on match days with the first-team players, although the club later denied he had been demoted or forced to work with the club's Academy players. The club confirmed that he was never asked or took any duties within the academy. On 17 February he left the club by mutual consent. It was reported that he received a £250,000 pay-off from the club.

After resigning from his post as head of sports medicine and sports science at Manchester City, he joined Major League Soccer team New York Red Bulls. He works as the team's performance director.

== Honours ==
Blackpool

- Football League Fourth Division play-offs: 1992
