= Steve Sanders =

Steve, Steven or Stephen Sanders may refer to:

- Steve Sanders (American football) (born 1982), American wide receiver
- Steve Sanders (90210), fictional American television drama Beverly Hills, 90210 character
- Steve Sanders (footballer) (born 1978), English footballer
- Steve Sanders (musician) (1952–1998), vocalist and guitarist for The Oak Ridge Boys
- Steve Sanders (karate) (born 1939)
- Steven 'gaze' Sanders (born 1976), Belgian guitarist for Spoil Engine
- Stephen Sanders, an alias used by the fictional character Doctor Strange

== See also ==
- Stephen Saunders (disambiguation)
