= Robert Pell =

Robert Pell may refer to:

- Robert Pell (footballer) (born 1979), English footballer
- Robert Livingston Pell (1818–1880), American landowner
