= McIlhargey =

McIlhargey is a surname of Irish origin, coming from the Irish Mac Giolla Fhearga, meaning "Son of the Servant of Saint Fergus". Notable people with the surname include:

- Jack McIlhargey (1952–2020), Canadian ice hockey player
- Steve McIlhargey (born 1962), Scottish footballer
