= Samways =

Samways is a surname. Notable people with the surname include:

- Mark Samways (born 1968), British footballer
- Vinny Samways (born 1968), British footballer
