= Jason White (footballer, born 1971) =

English footballer

Personal information
- Full name: Jason Gregory White
- Date of birth: 19 October 1971 (age 55)
- Place of birth: Meriden, England
- Position: Striker

Senior career*
Years	Team	Apps	(Gls)
1990–1991	Derby County	0	(0)
1991–1993	Scunthorpe United	68	(16)
1993	→ Darlington (loan)	4	(1)
1994–1995	Scarborough	63	(20)
1995–1997	Northampton Town	77	(18)
1997–2000	Rotherham United	73	(22)
2000–2003	Cheltenham Town	31	(1)
2000	→ Mansfield Town (loan)	7	(0)
2003	Sengkang Marine	?	(14)
2003	Grantham Town		
- * Club domestic league appearances and goals as of 19:31, 14 September 2007 (UTC)

Jason Gregory White (born 19 October 1971) is an English former professional footballer. He played as a striker.

== Career ==
White began his career with Derby County in 1990, but after failing to break into the Rams' first team, he left to join Scunthorpe United the following year. In his first season with the North Lincolnshire club, they reached the Division Four play-off final, in which they faced Blackpool at Wembley. The match went to a sudden-death penalty-shootout, in which White, who was a second-half substitute for Tony Daws, sent his effort high over Blackpool goalkeeper Steve McIlhargey's crossbar to hand promotion to the Lancastrians. In his two years with Scunthorpe, White made 68 league appearances and scored 16 goals.

White joined Scarborough in 1994. He spent one year with the club, making 63 league appearances and scoring twenty goals. He was named Scarborough's Clubman of the Year. In 1995, he signed for Northampton Town, making a total of 77 league appearances and scored 18 goals. Two years later, he was on the move again, this time to Rotherham United making a total of 73 league appearances and scored 22 goals.

Cheltenham Town came in for his services in 2000, and in his three years at Whaddon Road, he made 31 league appearances and scored only one goal, against Leyton Orient. After a loan spell at Mansfield Town, White spent a short spell in Singapore with Sengkang Marine.

White finished his career back in England with Grantham Town.

== Honours ==
Northampton Town

- Football League Third Division play-offs: 1997
