= Grant Leitch =

English footballer

Personal information
- Date of birth: 31 October 1972 (age 54)
- Place of birth: South Africa
- Position: Winger

Senior career*
Years	Team	Apps	(Gls)
1991–1994	Blackpool	25	(1)
1994–1995	Halifax Town		
- * Club domestic league appearances and goals

Grant Leitch is a former professional footballer who played primarily as a winger. Leitch played 25 Football League games for Blackpool between 1991 and 1994, scoring one goal in the competition, and went on to play for Conference club Halifax Town.

== Honours ==
Blackpool

- Football League Fourth Division play-off winner: 1991-92
