= Stephen Saunders =

Stephen Saunders may refer to:

- Stephen Saunders (British Army officer) (1947–2000), British military attaché based in Greece
- Stephen Saunders (24 character), character in U.S. TV series 24
- Stephen Saunders (entrepreneur), entrepreneur, author, and media consultant
- Steven Saunders, pseudonym of British children's writer Allan Frewin Jones (born 1954)
- Steve Saunders (footballer) (born 1964), English footballer

== See also ==
- Steve Sanders (disambiguation)
- Steven Saunders (born 1991), Scottish footballer
