= Mike Hennigan (footballer) =

English footballer and manager

Personal information
- Full name: Michael Hennigan
- Date of birth: 20 December 1942 (age 83)
- Place of birth: Thrybergh, England
- Height: 5 ft 11 in (1.80 m)
- Position: Central defender

Youth career
- 1961–1962: Sheffield Wednesday

Senior career*
Years	Team	Apps	(Gls)
1962–1964	Southampton	3	(0)
1964–1965	Brighton & Hove Albion	4	(0)
1965	Durban United		

Managerial career
- 1999–2000: Blackpool (caretaker)
- 2005: Malawi
- * Club domestic league appearances and goals

Michael Hennigan (born 20 December 1942) is an English retired professional football player and manager.

== Career ==
=== Playing career ===
Hennigan played as a central defender and began his career with the youth team of Sheffield Wednesday, but he never made a first team league appearance. Hennigan later played in the Football League for Southampton and Brighton & Hove Albion, before moving to South Africa to play with Durban United.

=== Managerial career ===
Hennigan briefly took joint temporary management of Blackpool in 1999, along with Mike Davies, after the departure of Nigel Worthington.

Hennigan managed the Malawi national side in 2005.
