= David Esdaille =

English footballer

Personal information
- Full name: David Esdaille
- Date of birth: 22 July 1963 (age 63)
- Place of birth: Manchester, England
- Position: Midfielder

Senior career*
Years	Team	Apps	(Gls)
- Winsford United
1992–1993	Wrexham	4	(0)
1993	Bury	6	(0)
- Altrincham
- Droylsden
1996-1997	Hyde United	17	(0)
1997–1998	Doncaster Rovers	13	(0)
- Flixton
1998-2000	Hyde United	5	(0)
- * Club domestic league appearances and goals

David Esdaille (born 22 July 1963) is an English former professional footballer who played as a midfielder. He made appearances in the English football league for Wrexham, Bury, and Doncaster Rovers.
