= Matt Russell (footballer) =

English footballer (born 1978)

Personal information
- Full name: Matthew Russell
- Date of birth: 17 January 1978 (age 48)
- Place of birth: Dewsbury, England
- Position: Defender

Senior career*
Years	Team	Apps	(Gls)
1996–1999	Scarborough	44	(3)
1997–1998	→ Doncaster Rovers (loan)	5	(0)
1999–2000	Halifax Town	7	(0)
–	Scarborough		
Total		56	(3)
- * Club domestic league appearances and goals

Matthew Russell (born 17 January 1978) is an English former professional footballerfrom Dewsbury who played in the Football League for Scarborough, Doncaster Rovers and Halifax Town. He was primarily listed as a midfielder.

== Career ==
Russell began his senior career with Scarborough. During the 1997–98 season, The Northern Echo reported that he deputised for suspended Scarborough captain John Kay. He also had a loan spell with Doncaster Rovers before returning to Scarborough.

In November 1998, The Press reported that Russell had been brought into the Scarborough side shortly before kick-off and scored the winning goal against Rochdale.

Russell joined Halifax Town in 1999 and later returned to Scarborough the same year. He later played for Forest Green Rovers. By June 2001, Russell was reported as having signed for Frickley Athletic.
