= Tony Rodwell =

English footballer

Personal information
- Full name: Anthony Rodwell
- Date of birth: 26 August 1962 (age 64)
- Place of birth: Southport, England
- Position: Right wing

Senior career*
Years	Team	Apps	(Gls)
- Southport
- Buxton
- Runcorn
–1990	Colne Dynamoes		
1990–1994	Blackpool	142	(17)
1994–1995	Scarborough	8	(1)
1995	→ Wigan Athletic (loan)	5	(1)
- Witton Albion
1998-1999	Hyde United	28	(0)
- * Club domestic league appearances and goals

Anthony Rodwell (born 26 August 1962) is an English former professional footballer. His preferred position was on the right wing.

Prior to turning professional, Southport-born Rodwell played for his hometown club, Buxton, Runcorn, and Colne Dynamoes. His most successful period came under the guidance of Billy Ayre at Blackpool, where, in May 1992, he won promotion to the new Division Two after a penalty shoot-out win over Scunthorpe in the Division Four play-off final at Wembley (after losing out to Torquay at the same venue twelve months earlier). He followed Ayre to Scarborough when the latter became manager at the McCain Stadium in 1994.

== Blackpool ==
Rodwell joined Graham Carr's Blackpool from Colne Dynamoes in the summer of 1990. He appeared in 49 of Blackpool's 51 league and cup games in his debut 1990–91 season, as well is in their three play-off ties (scoring Blackpool's goal in their semi-final, first leg draw at Scunthorpe United, a goal he has named his favourite), making the number-7 shirt his own. He scored on his full debut, in a 4–1 victory over Wrexham at Bloomfield Road on 15 September, after deputising for the injured on-loan Phil Stant in the forward line. He went on to score a further six league goals during the campaign, the majority of which came under the managership of Graham Carr's assistant, Billy Ayre, who took over the reins when Carr was fired.

In 1991–92, Rodwell scored eleven goals in 42 league appearances, including a hat-trick in Blackpool's 5–2 win at Aldershot on 5 November 1991; however, all records against Aldershot that season were expunged when, at the end of the campaign, the club went bankrupt.

Rodwell made a further 57 league appearances and scored two goals in his final three seasons with Blackpool.

After a short spell at Scarborough (which included a loan stint at Wigan Athletic), and Witton Albion, he finished his playing career with non-League Hyde United .

== Post-retirement ==
In January 2003, Rodwell returned to his hometown of Southport to become an assistant to Mike Walsh (formerly a coach at Blackpool) and, later, Programme for Academic and Sporting Excellence (PASE)/reserve-team coach. In September 2004 he left the role as reserve-team manager and later the role of PASE team Head Coach to become the Press Association's statistical floor manager at Old Trafford and the Eithad. He regularly provides stats on Manchester United and Southport, when they are at home.

== Personal life ==
Rodwell is married to Pauline. His daughter, Stacey, played for Everton L.F.C., Manchester United W.F.C. and California State University, Los Angeles' women's team. He is an uncle of fellow midfielder Jack Rodwell.

== Honours ==
Blackpool

- Football League Fourth Division play-offs: 1992
- Lancashire Cup: 1993–94
