= Martin McDonald =

Scottish footballer

Personal information
- Full name: Martin Joseph McDonald
- Date of birth: 4 December 1973 (age 52)
- Place of birth: Irvine, Scotland
- Position: Midfielder

Senior career*
Years	Team	Apps	(Gls)
1991–1992	Bramhall		
1992–1993	Stockport County	0	(0)
1993–1995	Macclesfield Town	75	(5)
1995–1996	Southport	21	(4)
1996–1997	Doncaster Rovers	48	(4)
1997–1998	Macclesfield Town	45	(3)
1998	Mossley	2	(1)
1998–1999	Droylsden		
1999–2000	Altrincham		
2000	Droylsden		
2000–2001	Hyde United	27	(1)
2001–2002	Flixton		
2002	Kidsgrove Athletic	?	(?)
2002–2003	Flixton		
2003	Salford City		
2003–2004	Cheadle Town		
2004–2005	Leek Town	16	(1)
2005–2006	Flixton		
2006	Witton Albion	2	(0)
2006	New Mills		
2006	Cheadle Town		
Total		236	(19)
- * Club domestic league appearances and goals

Martin Joseph McDonald (born 4 December 1973) is a Scottish former professional footballer who played as a midfielder for various teams in the Football League. He was born in Irvine, Scotland.
