= Adie Mike =

English footballer

Personal information
- Full name: Adrian Roosevelt Mike
- Date of birth: 16 November 1973 (age 52)
- Place of birth: Manchester, England
- Height: 6 ft 0 in (1.83 m)
- Position: Forward

Youth career
- –1992: Manchester City

Senior career*
Years	Team	Apps	(Gls)
1992–1995	Manchester City	16	(2)
1993	→ Bury (loan)	7	(1)
1994	→ Linköping (loan)		
1995–1997	Stockport County	9	(0)
1996	→ Hartlepool United (loan)	7	(1)
1997	→ Doncaster Rovers (loan)	5	(1)
1997–1998	Doncaster Rovers	44	(4)
1998–1999	Leek Town		
1999	Hednesford Town	18	(3)
1999–2000	Southport	15	(1)
2000–2002	Northwich Victoria	54	(13)
2002	Stalybridge Celtic	7	(0)
2002–2003	Lincoln City	17	(2)
2002–2003	→ Gainsborough Trinity (loan)		
2003	Cliftonville		
2003	Droylsden		
2003	Mossley	6	(3)
2003–2004	Leek Town		
- * Club domestic league appearances and goals

Adrian Roosevelt Mike (born 16 November 1973) is an English former professional footballer who played as a forward from 1992 to 2004.

He notably played in the Premier League for Manchester City, and in the Football League for Bury, Stockport County, Hartlepool United, Doncaster Rovers and Lincoln City. He also played in Sweden for Linköping and at Non-league level for Leek Town, Hednesford Town, Southport, Northwich Victoria, Stalybridge Celtic, Gainsborough Trinity, Droylsden and Mossley.

== Club career ==
=== Manchester City ===
Mike was born in Manchester, Lancashire. He came through the youth ranks at Manchester City, and made his professional debut against Notts County on 25 April 1992, scoring his first goal in the following match against Oldham Athletic. Whilst at City he played in the Premier League before leaving the club in 1995. He played 16 times in the league, scoring twice. Whilst at Maine Road he was loaned out twice, to Bury and Linköping.

=== Later career ===
Mike went on to play in the Football League for Stockport County, Hartlepool United, Doncaster Rovers and Lincoln City, and in the IFA Premiership for Cliftonville. He also played non-League football for Leek Town, Hednesford Town, Southport, Northwich Victoria, Stalybridge Celtic, Gainsborough Trinity, Droylsden and Mossley.

== International career ==
Mike played for England at schoolboy and youth international level.

== Personal life ==
After retirement, he worked as a personal trainer before studying law at BPP Law School in 2011, and is now managing director at Falcona Private Jets in Manchester. His cousin is Leon Mike.
