= Jack Brownsword =

English footballer (1923–2009)

Personal information
- Full name: Nathan John Brownsword
- Date of birth: 15 May 1923
- Place of birth: Campsall, England
- Date of death: 19 December 2009 (aged 86)
- Place of death: Scunthorpe, England
- Position: Left-back

Youth career
- Frickley Colliery

Senior career*
Years	Team	Apps	(Gls)
1946–1947	Hull City	10	(0)
1947	Frickley Colliery		
1947–1964	Scunthorpe United	597	(50)
- * Club domestic league appearances and goals

Nathan John Brownsword (15 May 1923 – 19 December 2009) was a professional footballer who spent eighteen seasons with Scunthorpe United, and holds the club's all-time appearance record, having played 597 league games, and 791 first-team games overall for the club. He was a defender, playing in the left-back position.

== Playing career ==
Originally from Doncaster, Brownsword left school aged 15 and spent the duration of the Second World War working as a miner at nearby Bentley Colliery. He began playing part-time for Frickley Colliery, before being recruited for Hull City's 1946–47 Third Division North season.

Continuing to play part-time alongside his work as a miner, Brownsword made eleven league and cup appearances for Hull, before being released after allegations that he had fallen out with manager Major Frank Buckley after accidentally sitting on Buckley's dog on the way to an away game.

He then returned to his first club Frickley Colliery and despite them finishing bottom of the Midland League, Brownsword re-established his reputation as the league's best left-back. This inspired then-leading non-league club Scunthorpe & Lindsey United to sign him for a fee of £2, plus expenses.

Brownsword continued to play football part-time alongside his work as a miner for the first three years of his career at Scunthorpe, before their election to the Football League in 1950. This elevation led to him accepting manager Leslie Jones's offer of a full-time professional contract of a £9 basic weekly wage, which was reduced to £6 in the summer.

Brownsword went on to make a club-record 597 league appearances (and 783 in all competitions, including non-league and cup games), during his 18 seasons as a player at the Old Showground. These records will almost certainly never be beaten, as he sits an enormous 322 appearances clear of second-place Paul Longden on the club's rankings.

Brownsword earned a reputation as a fearsome sprinter (completing the 100-yard dash in just 10.3 seconds) and a faultless penalty taker; scoring 52 of his 53 career league and cup goals for Scunthorpe from the spot. His excellent disciplinary (he was never once booked in his entire career) and injury records ensured that he only missed 26 League matches and never missed an FA Cup game across his whole time at the club.

With Scunthorpe having already been crowned Third Division North champions prior to their final 1957–58 game, Brownsword later alleged that he was offered a bribe by an unnamed visiting Carlisle United official to ensure Scunthorpe threw the game, guaranteeing Carlisle's place in the upcoming national 1958–59 Third Division season. "I was standing in the tunnel before the game and when someone approached me and offered us money to lose the game. I immediately told them to 'Get stuffed!' and we went out to show them how we could play. I would never throw a game". Brownsword later scored in a 3–1 Scunthorpe victory which relegated Carlisle to the Fourth Division.

Arguably Brownsword's finest hour in a Scunthorpe shirt arrived in their 1960-61 FA Cup campaign and their 6–2 Third Round victory over top-flight Blackpool. As left-back, Brownsword was directly responsible for marking the legendary "Wizard of Dribble" Stanley Matthews, with ex-England manager Graham Taylor remembering how Matthews "never got a kick against Jackie." The Independent newspaper also recalled how Matthews "was humbled by Scunthorpe's finest, at one point even changing his boots in a vain attempt to make an impact."

Matthews and Brownsword were due a reunion in the following 1961–62 Second Division season, but when Brownsword asked Stoke City's stand-in outside-right why Matthews was not in the team, he was told: "He was until he saw your name on the team-sheet!" Brownsword later described this reply as the "ultimate compliment".

Later that season, Brownsword's Scunthorpe finished an all-time club high of fourth in the Second Division, but having controversially sold star striker Barrie Thomas in January, Brownsword later bemoaned the missed opportunity: "I'm certain that if we hadn't sold Barrie, we would've made the First Division. The directors said we couldn't afford to go into the top flight and that disillusioned the players."

Having previously turned down lucrative moves to bigger clubs, including to the likes of Manchester City, Brownsword made his final professional appearance against Workington on 29 September 1964, at the age of 41.

== Coaching ==
Rejecting a two-year contract from Lincoln City that would have kept him playing, Brownsword immediately transitioned to coaching – becoming Scunthorpe United's club trainer. He would go on to become the only club figure involved in both of Scunthorpe United's only two runs in history to the FA Cup fifth round. The first in 1957–58 as player and the second in 1969–70 as coach.

His keen work ethic and knowledge of the game were cited as being instrumental in helping develop numerous players of the era, including Ray Clemence and Kevin Keegan. Keegan particularly praised Brownsword, saying: "He was great with me when I was developing as a player. I think we may have got on so well because he was from a similar background. He wasn't easy on us and was definitely a hard taskmaster. He always demanded 100 per cent and that is a great value to teach young players. I used to envy Jack, because he was good at everything technical and could repair anything. He believed that if you were fit, you could run for 90 minutes. Whether or not you could play was another matter!"

It also later transpired that Brownsword was instrumental in Keegan's dramatic transfer from Scunthorpe to Liverpool, personally recommending the player to legendary Liverpool manager Bill Shankly; with Keegan himself later recalling: "My move to Liverpool really came out of the blue. Jack had a big part to play in it."

Brownsword was later controversially dismissed from his coaching role at the club prior to the 1973–74 Fourth Division campaign, however. "I did feel a bit bitter when I got the bullet. Nobody ever told me why I was sacked, but my understanding was that a coach had written to the club asking if there were any vacancies and I created one! I was exceptionally disappointed that I was dispensed with in this way after all the service."

After 25 years of service, Brownsword was offered a testimonial, something he had never had as a player, as a "golden goodbye", but refused, stating: "I wasn't happy about that because it would have meant the supporters having to pay for it. I didn't think that was fair." This was Brownsword's final role within football.

== Honours ==
Third Division North champions: 1957–58

Scunthorpe United all-time record appearance holder (both in the Football League and all competitions).

He was also chosen to play five times by the Third Division North against the Third Division South, but was only able to play in two of the matches due to his club commitments.

The Professional Footballers' Association Hall of Fame.

== Legacy ==
Throughout Brownsword's career, he won many admirers, including legendary Liverpool manager Bill Shankly and England boss Graham Taylor. Shankly called Brownsword "the finest full-back operating outside the top division" and "the best full-back never to play for England"; whilst Taylor cited Brownsword as one of his footballing "heroes", before adding: "Jackie ... must have played 2,000 games for Scunthorpe. He was never injured. He was lightning quick and a magnificent penalty taker."

Despite his acrimonious departure, Brownsword returned to the Old Showground as the club's guest of honour for their final-ever game at the ground in 1988. And when the club was previously on the verge of bankruptcy in 1981, he had also helped organise a fundraising match, with a "Jack Brownsword XI" boasting the likes of Kevin Keegan and Jack Charlton taking part.

He was also made a Vice-President of Scunthorpe United and President of the Scunthorpe United Official Supporters Club.

The approach road to Glanford Park, Scunthorpe United's current home, was named Jack Brownsword Way on 4 July 2010 as a memorial to him.

In early 2012, the Winterton Iron Supporters' Club raised thousands of pounds for the Scunthorpe Alzheimer's Society in memory of Brownsword, with his widow Queenie, plus many of his ex-teammates and colleagues, including Kevin Keegan, in attendance.

== Personal life ==
Brownsword married his wife Queenie on Saturday 19 December 1953 at St. Andrew's Church in Burton-upon-Stather, on the morning of Scunthorpe's 2–1 victory over local rivals Grimsby Town.

Following his departure from Scunthorpe, Brownsword became a sales rep for a local glass company in Scunthorpe, until his retirement in 1988.

After a prolonged battle with Alzheimer's disease, Brownsword died on 19 December 2009, his 56th wedding anniversary, at the age of 86. There is also a small memorial stone dedicated to him in St. Andrew's churchyard Burton-upon-Stather, the village where he had lived for more than sixty years since signing for Scunthorpe.
