= Ian Helliwell =

English footballer (born 1962)

Personal information
- Full name: Ian Helliwell
- Date of birth: 7 November 1962 (age 63)
- Place of birth: Rotherham, England
- Height: 6 ft 3 in (1.91 m)
- Position: Striker

Youth career
- Sheffield Wednesday
- 1982–1983: Chesterfield

Senior career*
Years	Team	Apps	(Gls)
1983–1987	Matlock Town		
1987–1991	York City	160	(40)
1991–1993	Scunthorpe United	80	(22)
1993–1995	Rotherham United	52	(4)
1995–1996	Stockport County	39	(13)
1996–1998	Burnley	4	(0)
1996	→ Mansfield Town (loan)	5	(1)
1996	→ Chester City (loan)	9	(1)
1997–1998	→ Doncaster Rovers (loan)	8	(1)
1998–2002	Ilkeston Town		
Total		357	(82)

Managerial career
- 2000: Ilkeston Town (caretaker)
- 2001: Ilkeston Town (joint)
- 2002: Ilkeston Town (caretaker)
- * Club domestic league appearances and goals

Ian Helliwell (born 7 November 1962) is an English former professional footballer who played as a striker. He played in the Football League for York City, Scunthorpe United, Rotherham United, Stockport County, Burnley, Mansfield Town, Chester City and Doncaster Rovers.

He played for Sheffield Wednesday and Chesterfield as a youth, before joining Matlock Town in non-League football. After four seasons, he moved to the Football League with York City, where he was top scorer for three successive seasons. He moved on to Scunthorpe United, where he was top scorer for one season, before having spells with Rotherham United, Stockport County and Burnley. He was loaned out on three occasions while at Burnley and he finished his career with Ilkeston Town.

== Career ==
Born in Rotherham, West Riding of Yorkshire, Helliwell attended Old Hall Comprehensive School and started his football career as a junior with Sheffield Wednesday. He had trials at Stoke City before joining the reserve team at Chesterfield in 1982, and during his time as a youth player worked for steel producer British Steel Corporation. Helliwell moved into non-League football in 1983 with Northern Premier League club Matlock Town, where he scored 68 goals in just over four seasons before signing for Third Division club York City on 23 October 1987 for a £10,000 fee, which remains the record fee paid for a Matlock player. He made his debut a day later in a 4–2 away defeat to Sunderland, and scored his first goal on 7 November 1987 in a 1–1 home draw with Bury. He finished the 1987–88 season with 33 appearances and eight goals, while York were relegated into the Fourth Division. Helliwell finished 1988–89 as York's top scorer with 11 goals from 47 matches, and was voted as the Clubman of the Year by the club's supporters. His only hat-trick for the club came on 7 November 1989 in a 7–1 home victory over Hartlepool United in the Associate Members' Cup, and he finished 1989–90 as York's top scorer for the second successive season with 19 goals, playing in all 54 matches that season. In 1990–91, he finished as top scorer for a third successive season with 10 goals from 49 appearances.

Helliwell signed for York's Fourth Division rivals Scunthorpe United on 16 August 1991 for an £80,000 fee. He became the first player to miss a penalty kick in a penalty shoot-out, in an FA Cup match against Rotherham United on 26 November 1991. He played in the 1992 Fourth Division play-off final, which Scunthorpe lost on penalties to Blackpool. Helliwell scored 14 goals from 50 appearances for Scunthorpe in 1991–92. He finished as top scorer for 1992–93 with 17 goals from 51 matches, and before the start of the following season, signed for Second Division club Rotherham United on 1 August 1993 for a £50,000 fee. He played some matches as a centre-back at Rotherham, where he made 47 appearances and scored three goals in 1993–94. Having made 16 appearances and scored three goals during 1994–95, Helliwell signed for Second Division club Stockport County on 12 January 1995 as a replacement for Kevin Francis. He scored twice on his debut on 14 January 1995 in a 4–0 home win over Hull City, and finished the season with 17 appearances and 4 goals for Stockport. Having scored 11 goals in 29 matches during 1995–96, Helliwell signed for Second Division club Burnley on 9 February 1996 for a £30,000 fee. He made four appearances for Burnley before the end of 1995–96.

He was loaned out to Third Division club Mansfield Town on 6 September 1996 for one month, and made his debut the following day in a 0–0 away draw with Doncaster Rovers. He scored his only goal in his final match, a 1–1 away draw with Carlisle United on 5 October 1996, finishing his loan at Mansfield with five appearances. Helliwell was soon loaned out to another Third Division club, joining Chester City on 11 October 1996, making his debut a day later in a 0–0 draw away to Scarborough. His only goal came on 19 October 1996 in a 2–1 home win over Exeter City, and having made nine appearances returned to Burnley in December. His only appearances of 1997–98 came after joining Third Division club Doncaster on loan on 3 November 1997, debuting the following day in a 1–1 home draw with Cardiff City. He finished the loan with nine appearances and one goal, which came on 2 December 1997 in a 2–1 home win over Chester.

Helliwell returned to playing non-League football when joining Southern League club Ilkeston Town in 1998 and featured for them in FA Cup matches against Football League teams Carlisle United and Swindon Town. Having returned to semi-professional football, he worked part-time as an electrician. Helliwell took over as caretaker manager at Ilkeston after Keith Alexander resigned in October 2000, and led the team to the first round of the FA Cup before John McGovern was appointed in November. In March 2001, Helliwell was appointed as one of a three-man management team at Ilkeston alongside former Burnley teammate Charlie Bishop and former York teammate Chris Marples. The trio guided the club to safety at the end of 2000–01; Marples was consequently hired as manager on a permanent basis in May 2001 and Helliwell returned to his playing role. After Marples left Ilkeston in March 2002, Bishop and Helliwell took caretaker charge before John McGinlay was appointed later that month. Helliwell retired from football following 2001–02, having spent four seasons with Ilkeston.

== Style of play ==
Helliwell played as a striker and, at 6 ft 3 in (1.91 m), his height made him a "useful aerial weapon".

== Career statistics ==
Appearances and goals by club, season and competition
Club	Season	League			FA Cup		League Cup		Other		Total	
Club	Season	Division	Apps	Goals	Apps	Goals	Apps	Goals	Apps	Goals	Apps	Goals
York City	1987–88	Third Division	32	8	0	0	0	0	1 (Note: Appearance(s) in Associate Members' Cup)	0	33	8
York City	1988–89	Fourth Division	41	11	1	0	2	0	3	0	47	11
York City	1989–90	Fourth Division	46	14	1	0	4	1	3	4	54	19
York City	1990–91	Fourth Division	41	7	3	0	2	0	3	3	49	10
York City	Total		160	40	5	0	8	1	10	7	183	48
Scunthorpe United	1991–92	Fourth Division	39	9	2	2	4	1	5 (Note: Two appearances in Associate Members' Cup, three appearances and two goals in Fourth Division play-offs)	2	50	14
Scunthorpe United	1992–93	Third Division	41	13	2	0	4	4	4 (Note: Appearance(s) in Football League Trophy)	0	51	17
Scunthorpe United	Total		80	22	4	2	8	5	9	2	101	31
Rotherham United	1993–94	Second Division	40	3	1	0	4	0	2	0	47	3
Rotherham United	1994–95	Second Division	12	1	2	1	1	0	1	1	16	3
Rotherham United	Total		52	4	3	1	5	0	3	1	63	6
Stockport County	1994–95	Second Division	17	4	—		—		—		17	4
Stockport County	1995–96	Second Division	22	9	2	1	4	1	1	0	29	11
Stockport County	Total		39	13	2	1	4	1	1	0	46	15
Burnley	1995–96	Second Division	4	0	—		—		—		4	0
Burnley	1996–97	Second Division	0	0	0	0	0	0	0	0	0	0
Burnley	1997–98	Second Division	0	0	—		0	0	—		0	0
Burnley	Total		4	0	0	0	0	0	0	0	4	0
Mansfield Town (loan)	1996–97	Third Division	5	1	—		—		—		5	1
Chester City (loan)	1996–97	Third Division	9	1	0	0	—		—		9	1
Doncaster Rovers (loan)	1997–98	Third Division	8	1	0	0	—		1	0	9	1
Career total			357	82	14	4	25	7	24	10	420	103

== Honours ==
Individual

- York City Clubman of the Year: 1988–89
