= Dave Burgess (footballer) =

English footballer (born 1960)

Personal information
- Full name: David John Burgess
- Date of birth: 20 January 1960 (age 66)
- Place of birth: Liverpool, England
- Height: 5 ft 10 in (1.78 m)
- Position: Defender

Senior career*
| Years | Team | Apps | (Gls) |
| 1981–1986 | Tranmere Rovers | 218 | (1) |
| 1986–1988 | Grimsby Town | 69 | (0) |
| 1988–1993 | Blackpool | 101 | (1) |
| 1992–1993 | → Carlisle United (loan) | 6 | (0) |
| 1993–1994 | Carlisle United | 40 | (1) |
| 1994–1995 | → Hartlepool United (loan) | 11 | (0) |
| 1995–1996 | Northwich Victoria | ? | (?) |
| 1996–1997 | Bamber Bridge | ? | (?) |
| Total | | 445 | (3) |
- * Club domestic league appearances and goals

David John Burgess (born 20 January 1960) is an English former professional footballer. He played as a right-back.

Burgess began his career at Tranmere Rovers in 1981, and went on to make over 200 league appearances for the Wirral club in five years.

In 1986, he signed for Grimsby Town. In two years at Blundell Park he made 69 appearances.

He returned to the west coast in 1988 when he joined Sam Ellis' Blackpool. He made just over 100 appearances for the Seasiders in five years, and was a member of the team that won the Fourth Division play-off final at Wembley in May 1992. This was after sitting out the entire 1990–91 season through injury.

During the following season, he was loaned out to Carlisle United for a month, and made the move permanent later that season. He spent a year with the Cumbrians, making 40 appearances and scoring one goal.

Another loan spell followed, this time at Hartlepool United, before moves to Northwich Victoria and Bamber Bridge, with whom he finished his career.

== Honours ==
Blackpool

- Football League Fourth Division play-offs: 1992

== Sources ==
- Dave Burgess at Post War English & Scottish Football League A–Z Player's Transfer Database
- Profile at PlayerHistory.com
