= John Buckley (footballer, born 1962) =

Scottish footballer (born 1962)

Personal information
- Full name: John William Buckley
- Date of birth: 18 May 1962 (age 64)
- Place of birth: East Kilbride, Scotland
- Height: 5 ft 9 in (1.75 m)
- Position: Midfielder

Youth career
- Claremont BC
- Queen's Park
- 1978–1983: Celtic

Senior career*
Years	Team	Apps	(Gls)
1982–1983	Celtic	0	(0)
1983–1984	Partick Thistle	45	(5)
1984–1986	Doncaster Rovers	84	(11)
1986–1987	Leeds United	12	(1)
1987	→ Leicester City (loan)	5	(0)
1987	→ Doncaster Rovers (loan)	6	(0)
1987–1990	Rotherham United	105	(13)
1990–1991	Partick Thistle	26	(5)
1991–1993	Scunthorpe United	43	(8)
1993	Rotherham United	4	(0)

Managerial career
- 2003–2013: Doncaster Rovers Belles
- * Club domestic league appearances and goals

John William Buckley (born 18 May 1962) is a Scottish football coach and former player, who was manager of English FA WSL club Doncaster Rovers Belles from 2003 until 2013.

Buckley made over 350 league appearances as a winger in a playing career that began with Celtic, where he made his professional debut. He later played for clubs including Partick Thistle, Doncaster Rovers and Leeds United before ending his playing career with Rotherham United. A serious head injury suffered in March 1993 brought about Buckley's retirement from playing at the age of 31.

In June 2003 Buckley became manager of Doncaster Rovers Belles and under him the club qualified for the FA Women's Premier League Cup final in 2009. The club had won on the last day of the season in 2004–05 to avoid relegation. In September 2008 Buckley was in charge when the club came close to folding due to lack of finances. Despite operating with a limited budget Doncaster Rovers Belles were named as founder members of the FA WSL in 2010. He left by mutual consent in September 2013.

== Playing career ==
=== Celtic ===
Buckley began his professional career in the youth ranks of Celtic, and won the Glasgow Cup in 1982. In the final against Rangers at Ibrox in front of 15,000 spectators Buckley created a goal for John Sludden, as Celtic's mixture of first team and reserves won 2–1. Buckley made his first and, it would transpire, only, first-team appearance against Arbroath in a 4–1 Scottish League Cup win at Celtic Park in September 1982.

After a period of understudying Davie Provan at Celtic, Buckley went on loan to Partick Thistle in March 1983.

=== Partick Thistle ===
Buckley's speed and crossing ability quickly made him a crowd favourite at Firhill, as Peter Cormack's team competed for promotion to the Scottish Premier Division. He scored on his Scottish Football League debut in April 1983. In August 1983 Buckley joined Thistle permanently, as part of Celtic's £65,000 capture of Brian Whittaker. He remained a regular throughout the 1983–84 season.

=== Doncaster Rovers ===
Third Division Doncaster Rovers' Scottish manager Billy Bremner paid £30,000 to take Buckley to South Yorkshire in July 1984. At Doncaster Rovers Buckley's pace down the wings earned him the nickname "Road Runner". In 2009 Buckley recalled that Doncaster's Belle Vue ground "had the biggest playing surface in Britain at the time, which suited my game. And although Bremner was not a brilliant coach, he was a fantastic motivator. I would run through granite for him."

=== Leeds United ===
Two years later, Bremner brought Buckley with him to Second Division Leeds United for £35,000. Whilst at Elland Road, Buckley was sent on two short loan spells; at First Division club Leicester City, then back at Doncaster Rovers. He was unable to produce his best form at Leeds and—after one goal in ten League appearances—was sold to Rotherham United in November 1987 for £30,000.

=== Rotherham United ===
At Millmoor Buckley scored 13 goals in 105 League games, of which 20 were substitute appearances. He also scored twice in 21 appearances in Cup competitions. Capable of playing on either wing, Buckley was highly regarded by Rotherham supporters and was part of the club's Fourth Division championship winning side in 1989.

=== Partick Thistle again ===
Rejoining Partick Thistle in October of the 1990–91 season, Buckley played 26 games and scored five goals as the team displayed attractive football but failed to win promotion. The unfavourable economic climate meant Buckley could not sell his house in northern England, so he was granted a transfer to Scunthorpe United in August 1991. The fee of £40,000 represented a £5,000 loss on Partick's initial outlay.

=== Scunthorpe United ===
Buckley hit six goals in 28 League appearances as Scunthorpe made it to Wembley Stadium in the 1991–92 Fourth Division play–off final against Blackpool. He featured in Scunthorpe's defeat by penalty shootout following a 1–1 draw. After a total of eight League goals in 43 games, Scunthorpe accepted a £20,000 transfer offer for Buckley from Rotherham United.

=== Rotherham United again ===
In only his fourth game in his second spell at Rotherham, versus Plymouth Argyle on 13 March 1993, Buckley fractured his skull in a clash of heads with Gary Poole. He required emergency surgery to remove a blood clot from the brain and was in a coma on life support for four days afterwards. Buckley recovered from his injuries but had to retire from professional football aged 31.

He made comeback attempts with Buxton and Hatfield Main, but was knocked unconscious while playing for the latter in a Northern Counties East Football League match at Maltby Miners Welfare in October 1995. He then decided to retire from playing for good.

== Coaching career ==
Buckley obtained his football coaching qualifications and worked with the youth teams at Leeds United and Hull City.

In June 2003 he was appointed manager of FA Women's Premier League club Doncaster Rovers Belles, the female section of Doncaster Rovers.

Throughout his tenure at Doncaster Rovers Belles, Buckley placed a strong emphasis on youth development. This was partly because the club could no longer compete financially with rival clubs in the transfer market. He left the club by mutual consent in September 2013, following the decision by the Football Association to demote the Belles from the top level. In April 2014 Buckley revealed that he left because the board appointed Julie Chipchase as director of football behind his back. He roundly criticised the role played by vice chairman Alan Smart: "We were friends and I felt like he went behind my back. I won't engage with him again." John was a football coach at Balby Carr Community Academy. He now coaches Doncaster New College first team who play in the AOC leagues.

== Honours ==
Rotherham United

- Football League Fourth Division: 1988–89
