= Robert Pell (footballer) =

English footballer

Personal information
- Date of birth: 5 February 1979 (age 47)
- Place of birth: Leeds, England
- Position: Striker

Senior career*
Years	Team	Apps	(Gls)
1996–1998	Rotherham United	2	(0)
1997–1998	→ Doncaster Rovers (loan)	10	(1)
1999–2000	Northwich Victoria	4	(1)
2000–2001	Southport	11	(2)
2002	Larvik		
2003	Southport	11	(3)
2003–????	Worksop Town		
- * Club domestic league appearances and goals

Robert Pell (born 5 February 1979) is an English football forward.

He was born in Leeds. Between 1996 and 2001 he played for Rotherham United, Doncaster Rovers, Northwich Victoria and Southport. In late 2002 he played abroad for Larvik Fotball. He then returned to Southport in January 2003, and also played for Worksop Town later that year.
