= Joe Joyce (footballer) =

English footballer

Personal information
- Full name: Joseph Patrick Joyce
- Date of birth: 18 March 1961 (age 65)
- Place of birth: Consett, England
- Height: 5 ft 8 in (1.73 m)
- Position: Right back

Youth career
- 1979: Barnsley

Senior career*
Years	Team	Apps	(Gls)
1979–1991	Barnsley	334	(4)
1991–1993	Scunthorpe United	91	(2)
1993–1995	Carlisle United	50	(0)
- * Club domestic league appearances and goals

Joseph Patrick Joyce (born 18 March 1961) is an English former footballer who made 479 appearances in the Football League playing for Barnsley, Scunthorpe United, Carlisle United and Darlington. He played as a right back. He was appointed Academy Director at Newcastle United in 2006.

== Playing career ==
Born in Consett, County Durham, Joyce made more than 350 appearances for Barnsley, where he began his career. He later played for Scunthorpe United and Carlisle United and had a brief loan spell at Darlington.

== Coaching career ==
Joyce began his coaching career with Carlisle United, and was assistant manager of the club under Mervyn Day until 1997. He went on to become Head of Coaching with the Professional Footballers' Association, and was appointed Academy Director at Newcastle United in 2006.

== Honours ==
Carlisle United

- Football League Third Division: 1994–95
