= Paul Longden =

English footballer

Personal information
- Full name: David Paul Longden
- Date of birth: 28 September 1962 (age 64)
- Place of birth: East Ardsley, England
- Height: 5 ft 9 in (1.75 m)
- Position: Left-back

Senior career*
Years	Team	Apps	(Gls)
1981–1982	Barnsley	5	(0)
1983–1993	Scunthorpe United	455	(0)
Total		460	(0)
- * Club domestic league appearances and goals

David Paul Longden (born 28 September 1962) is an English former footballer who played in the Football League for Barnsley and Scunthorpe United. After his release by Barnsley, Longden turned down a move to Australia to join Scunthorpe on a free transfer.

He became a regular for The Iron over the next decade and was voted by supporters as the club's player of the year following the 1989–1990 season. Nicknamed 'Longy' or 'Waxy' by teammates, Longden was awarded a testimonial prior to the start of the 1992–93 season.

Despite being forced to retire after breaking his leg aged just 30, he is second on Scunthorpe's all-time appearance list with 461 games, behind only Jack Brownsword in first place. His only two professional goals both came in penalty shoot-outs.

After retirement, Longden managed the Scunthorpe United club restaurant and 'Iron Bar' alongside coaching in the club's academy, before relocating to North Yorkshire in 2005 to run a post office.
