= Steve Sanders (footballer) =

English footballer

Personal information
- Full name: Steven Sanders
- Date of birth: 2 June 1978 (age 48)
- Place of birth: Halifax, England
- Position: Full-back

Youth career
- Huddersfield Town

Senior career*
Years	Team	Apps	(Gls)
1996–1997	Huddersfield Town	0	(0)
1997–1998	Doncaster Rovers	25	(0)
1998	Lincoln City	0	(0)
1998–1999	Boreham Wood		
1999	Harrogate Town		
1999–200x	Guiseley		
–	Liversedge		
2002–2003	Chelmsford City	14	(1)
2003–2004	Maidenhead United		
2004–200?	Kingstonian		
- * Club domestic league appearances and goals

Steven Sanders (born 2 June 1978 in Halifax) is an English former professional footballer who played in the Football League as a full-back for Doncaster Rovers. He began his career with Huddersfield Town, but never played in the league. After Doncaster he joined Lincoln City, but again never played league football, and then went on to play non-league football for Boreham Wood, Harrogate Town, Guiseley, Liversedge, Chelmsford City, Maidenhead United and Kingstonian.

Sanders is now working for Jones Lang LaSalle as a quantity surveyor after graduating from Leeds Metropolitan University.
