= Dave Hill (footballer) =

English footballer and manager

Personal information
- Full name: David Michael Hill
- Date of birth: 6 June 1966 (age 60)
- Place of birth: Nottingham, England
- Height: 5 ft 9 in (1.75 m)
- Position: Midfielder

Senior career*
Years	Team	Apps	(Gls)
1983–1988	Scunthorpe United	140	(10)
1988–1991	Ipswich Town	61	(0)
1991–1993	Scunthorpe United	65	(6)
1993–1995	Lincoln City	58	(6)
1994	→ Chesterfield (loan)	3	(0)
1995–2000	Cork City		
2000–2002	Bohemians		
- Cobh Ramblers

Managerial career
- Cobh Ramblers (Player/Manager)
- Cork City (Assistant manager)
- 2009–2014: Cobh Ramblers
- * Club domestic league appearances and goals

David Michael Hill (born 6 June 1966 in Nottingham) is an English former professional footballer and is the former manager of Cobh Ramblers.

He made 327 league appearances in England with Scunthorpe United, Ipswich Town, Lincoln City and Chesterfield before moving to Ireland in 1995 and joining Cork City. He spent 5 seasons at the club, winning an FAI Cup winners medal and League of Ireland Cup winners medal. He also picked up 2 runners up medals in the League of Ireland Premier Division.

In August 2000, Hill moved to Dublin to Bohemians. In his first season, he finally won a Premier Division winners medal and to top it off, he was part of the team that completed the "Double" a week later when winning the FAI Cup. Hill spent another season at Bohs before taking up the offer of the player/manager job at First Division side Cobh Ramblers. He spent 2 seasons here and reached the playoffs but couldn't get the club promoted. He then became assistant manager at Cork City. He left when Damien Richardson was sacked.

== Honours ==
- League of Ireland: 1
  - Bohemians - 2000–01
- FAI Cup: 2
  - Cork City - 1998
  - Bohemians - 2001
- League of Ireland Cup: 1
  - Cork City - 1998-99
