= Steve McIlhargey =

Scottish footballer

Personal information
- Date of birth: 23 August 1964 (age 62)
- Place of birth: Glasgow, Scotland
- Position: Goalkeeper

Youth career
- Blantyre Celtic

Senior career*
Years	Team	Apps	(Gls)
1987–1989	Walsall	1	(0)
1988	Rotherham United	0	(0)
1989–1994	Blackpool	141	(0)
1993	→ Chester City (loan)	1	(0)
1994–2004	Morecambe	171	(0)
2000	→ Lancaster City (loan)	2	(0)
2003	Chorley (loan)	3	(0)
2003	→ Fleetwood Town (loan)	1	(0)
- * Club domestic league appearances and goals

Stephen McIlhargey (born 23 August 1964) is a Scottish retired professional footballer who played as a goalkeeper. During his career, he played for Walsall, Chester City and Blackpool. He also represented Scotland at schoolboy level.

== Playing career ==
McIlhargey joined Blackpool from Walsall in the summer of 1989. He made his league debut in the opening game, against Wigan Athletic at Bloomfield Road on 19 August, and kept a clean sheet in a goalless draw. His first season with the Seasiders wasn't a successful one. The club finished second-bottom of Division Three and were relegated, though McIlhargey only started 22 of the 46 games.

In October 1989, McIlhargey required fifty stitches in a facial injury sustained during a training-ground accident three weeks earlier.

In the 1990–91 season, McIlhargey missed only two league games and kept seventeen clean sheets. Blackpool finished the campaign in fifth place, but missed out on promotion after losing to Torquay United in the play-off final.

During Blackpool's FA Cup third-round tie against Tottenham Hotspur at Bloomfield Road on 5 January 1991, BBC commentator Tony Gubba mispronounced McIlhargey's surname as McIlluggy for the duration of the tie.

The conclusion of the following season, 1991–92, was the moment for which he is best remembered. Blackpool made the Wembley play-off final for the second consecutive season, this time against Scunthorpe United. After 90 minutes, the score was tied at 1–1, and the match went to extra time and then a penalty shoot-out. It was in the latter that McIlhargey's save from Scotland international Graham Alexander's penalty, combined with Jason White's subsequent miss, sent the Seasiders into the new Division Two. In an act of sportsmanship, McIlhargey broke away from celebrating with his teammates and was the first to commiserate with White.

With Lee Martin and Mel Capleton selected as goalkeeper numbers one and two, the Scot traded the Blackpool seaside for that of nearby Morecambe in the summer of 1993 for the remaining decade of his playing career. He helped the Shrimps to secure their place in the Conference, and his league experience was crucial in their push for promotion.

In the years leading up to his retirement, McIlhargey became the Shrimps' back-up goalkeeper but was rarely named on the substitutes' bench, with manager Jim Harvey preferring to have five outfield players to choose from.

McIlhargey retired from playing in May 2004 but remained at Morecambe in the capacity of goalkeeping coach. He was named on the bench for both of Morecambe's Johnstone's Paints Trophy regional final matches during the 2007–08 season, due to first-choice goalkeeper Jalal being cup-tied.

== Honours ==
Blackpool

- Football League Fourth Division play-offs: 1992

Morecambe

- Northern Premier League second-place promotion: 1994–95
- Lancashire FA Challenge Trophy: 1995–96, 1998–99
- Spalding Cup: 1997–98
