= Mark Samways =

English footballer (born 1968)

Personal information
- Full name: Mark Samways
- Date of birth: 11 November 1968 (age 57)
- Place of birth: Doncaster, England
- Height: 6 ft 2 in (1.88 m)
- Position: Goalkeeper

Team information
- Current team: Doncaster Rovers (youth coach)

Youth career
- 19??–1987: Doncaster Rovers

Senior career*
Years	Team	Apps	(Gls)
1987–1992	Doncaster Rovers	121	(0)
1991–1997	Scunthorpe United	180	(0)
1997–1998	York City	29	(0)
1998–2000	Darlington	34	(0)
–	Matlock Town		
–	Frickley Athletic		
- * Club domestic league appearances and goals

Mark Samways (born 11 November 1968) is an English former professional footballer who made 364 appearances in the Football League playing as a goalkeeper for Doncaster Rovers, Scunthorpe United, York City and Darlington.

== Career ==
Samways was born in Doncaster, and began his career in the youth system of hometown club Doncaster Rovers. He made his debut in the Third Division on 11 March 1988 in a 2–2 draw at home to Chester City. He was ever-present in the League in the 1989–90 season, before moving on to Scunthorpe United in March 1992, initially on loan. He was first-choice goalkeeper for that club for four and a half seasons, and was voted Player of the Season for 1994–95. He spent time at York City and Darlington, and had an unsuccessful trial back at Doncaster, before moving into non-League football with Matlock Town and Frickley Athletic.

In 2012, Samways was coaching at Doncaster Rovers' Centre of Excellence.
