= Mitch Cook =

English association footballer and manager

Personal information
- Full name: Mitchell Christopher Cook
- Date of birth: 15 October 1961 (age 65)
- Place of birth: Scarborough, England
- Height: 5 ft 10 in (1.78 m)
- Positions: Left-back; midfielder

Senior career*
Years	Team	Apps	(Gls)
1980–1984	Scarborough	230	(56)
1984–1985	Darlington	34	(4)
1985–1986	Middlesbrough	3	(0)
1986–1989	Scarborough	61	(10)
1989–1991	Halifax Town	52	(2)
1990	→ Scarborough (loan)	2	(0)
1991–1992	Darlington	35	(3)
1992–1994	Blackpool	66	(0)
1994–1995	Hartlepool United	22	(0)
1995–1996	Guiseley	?	(?)
1996	Scarborough	2	(0)
1996–1999	Whitby Town	?	(?)

Managerial career
- 1996: Scarborough
- 2010–2011: Pickering Town
- 2011–2014: Bridlington Town
- * Club domestic league appearances and goals

Mitchell Christopher Cook (born 15 October 1961) is an English retired professional footballer. He played for seven different Football League clubs during a twenty-year career, and had four separate spells at Scarborough, his hometown club. He later coached at the club and ran the club's Centre of Excellence and Football in the Community sections until the club's demise in 2007, whereupon he moved the youth system, community section and Under-19 team of Scarborough F.C. to George Pindar Community Sports College on the outskirts of town.

In 2008, Cook was appointed Director of Football for the newly formed Scarborough Town F.C., an adult extension of the Under-19 Academy and which he led to the championship of Teesside League Division Two in 2008–09, whilst his youth team won the "double" in the Northern Under-19 Alliance (Eastern Division). In 2009–10 he guided Scarborough Town to the championship of the Wearside League (Step 7) with the team also winning the prestigious Sunderland Shipowners Cup. The youth team retained its title in the Northern Under-19 Alliance.

In October 2010, Cook replaced Mark Wood as the manager of Pickering Town, taking control of both the first team and the under 19 side. After one season at the club, he left in May 2011 to take over at Bridlington Town.

== Honours ==
=== As a player ===
Scarborough

- Football Conference: 1986–87

Blackpool

- Football League Fourth Division play-offs: 1992
- Lancashire Senior Cup: 1993–94

Whitby Town

- Northern League: 1996–97
- FA Vase: 1996–97
