= Mike Davies (footballer) =

English footballer (born 1966)

Personal information
- Full name: Michael John Davies
- Date of birth: 19 January 1966 (age 60)
- Place of birth: Stretford, England
- Height: 5 ft 8 in (1.73 m)
- Position: Right-back

Youth career
- Blackpool

Senior career*
Years	Team	Apps	(Gls)
1984–1995	Blackpool	310	(16)

Managerial career
- 1999–2000: Blackpool (temporary)
- * Club domestic league appearances and goals

Michael John Davies (born 19 January 1966) is an English former professional footballer. He spent the entirety of his eleven-year playing career with Blackpool, for whom he became a coach after his retirement from playing in 1995. He was also their joint temporary manager with Mick Hennigan between December 1999 and January 2000.

== Playing career ==
Born in Stretford, Lancashire, and nicknamed Ginge because of his hair colour, he played for Trafford Boys. He became a successful product of Blackpool's youth department, and made over 300 appearances for the Seasiders. He made his debut in May 1984 in a home win over Halifax Town.

Initially a right winger, he won a regular place in the team, replacing Ian Britton and forming a partnership with John Deary. Under Sam Ellis's guidance, Davies continued to play on the wide right for the next few seasons, scoring important goals that helped the team to promotion.

On 29 March 1986, Davies, a 27th-minute substitute, scored the winning goal in a 2–1 victory over Rotherham United at Bloomfield Road. The goal was greeted by "roars of acclaim" that were "a fickle contrast to the boos that greeted Davies' arrival off the subs' bench."

During the 1987–88 season, Davies was moved to the full back position, prompted by the arrival of Tony Cunningham, a move he adapted well to – so much so that the Blackpool supporters voted him the club's Player of the Year.

"A fast, tricky player with tremendous commitment, the flame-haired terrier often found himself in trouble with over-zealous referees, who didn't always appreciate his approach," wrote Roy Calley in his 1992 book, Blackpool: A Complete Record 1887–1992. "One feels that if every man to have worn a Blackpool shirt over the years had showed as much commitment to the cause as Mike Davies, then the Seasiders would never have fallen from grace."

== Blackpool F.C. Hall of Fame ==
Davies was inducted into the Hall of Fame at Bloomfield Road, when it was officially opened by former Blackpool player Jimmy Armfield in April 2006. Organised by the Blackpool Supporters Association, Blackpool fans around the world voted on their all-time heroes. Five players from each decade are inducted; Davies is in the 1980s.

== Post-retirement ==
After he retired from playing, Davies remained on the Fylde coast, becoming a coach with Blackpool. Then also became a care worker in Blackpool.

== Honours ==
Blackpool

- Football League Fourth Division play-offs: 1992
- Lancashire Cup: 1993–94, 1994–95

== See also ==
- One-club man
