= Bill Green (footballer, born 1950) =

English footballer and manager

Personal information
- Full name: William Green
- Date of birth: 22 December 1950
- Place of birth: Newcastle, England
- Date of death: 21 August 2017 (aged 66)
- Position: Central defender

Senior career*
Years	Team	Apps	(Gls)
1969–1973	Hartlepool United	131	(9)
1973–1976	Carlisle United	119	(4)
1976–1978	West Ham United	35	(1)
1978–1979	Peterborough United	30	(0)
1979–1983	Chesterfield	160	(5)
1983–1984	Doncaster Rovers	11	(1)
Total		475	(20)

Managerial career
- 1991–1993: Scunthorpe United
- 1994–1996: Buxton
- 2002: Sheffield Wednesday (caretaker)
- * Club domestic league appearances and goals

William Green (22 December 1950 – 21 August 2017) was an English professional football player and manager.

Born on 22 December 1950 in Newcastle upon Tyne, he attended St Mary's RC Boy's Technical School.

He joined Hartlepool United from school and made his league debut for them against Newport County in September 1969. He joined Carlisle United in July 1973 for £15,000. Then he signed for West Ham United in June 1976 for £75,000. He later went on to play for Peterborough United, Chesterfield and Doncaster Rovers as a centre-half. He also managed Scunthorpe United from 1991 to 1993, with a record of playing 101, won 43, lost 32, drawn 26. He lost his job after an expected promotion push in 1993 never happened. In 2002, he took caretaker charge of Sheffield Wednesday for one game, which they lost. He was the chief European Scout at Wigan Athletic and worked in a similar role at Derby County, alongside former Burton Albion manager Nigel Clough before being sacked in March 2009.

== Death ==
Green died following a short illness, on 21 August 2017, aged 66
