= Tony Daws =

English footballer (born 1966)

Personal information
- Full name: Anthony Daws
- Date of birth: 10 September 1966 (age 60)
- Place of birth: Sheffield, England
- Height: 5 ft 9 in (1.75 m)
- Position: Striker

Team information
- Current team: Scunthorpe United (Academy manager)

Youth career
- 1980–1981: Manchester United
- 1981–1983: Notts County
- 1983–1985: Notts County (apprentice)

Senior career*
| Years | Team | Apps | (Gls) |
| 1984–1986 | Notts County | 8 | (1) |
| 1986–1987 | Sheffield United | 11 | (3) |
| 1987–1993 | Scunthorpe United | 183 | (63) |
| 1993–1994 | Grimsby Town | 16 | (1) |
| 1994–1996 | Lincoln City | 51 | (13) |
| 1995–1996 | Halifax Town | 5 | (1) |
| 1996–1997 | Scarborough | 6 | (0) |
| 1996–1997 | Altrincham | 6 | |
| 1996–1997 | Bradford Park Avenue | | |

International career
| 1981–1982 | England U15s | 1 | (0) |
| 1984 | England Youth | 1 | (0) |

Managerial career
- 2011: Scunthorpe United (interim manager)
- 2022: Scunthorpe United (interim manager)
- * Club domestic league appearances and goals

Anthony Daws (born 10 September 1966) is an English football coach and former professional footballer. He is academy manager of National League side Scunthorpe United.

As a player, he was a striker and played for Notts County, Sheffield United, Scunthorpe United, Grimsby Town, Lincoln City, Halifax Town, Scarborough and Altrincham. A recurring back injury that first occurred during his spell at Scunthorpe United forced him to retire from playing at a relatively early age.

He then took up junior coaching positions at Sheffield United and Sheffield Wednesday before becoming academy manager at Scunthorpe United – he was interim manager of the club from 1 September to 28 November 2022.

== Early life ==
Daws attended Gleadless Junior and Ashleigh Comprehensive School in Sheffield. He represented his country at U15 and U18 level at football. His first appearance at Wembley was on 5 June 1982 in the Dentyne Trophy, which was contested against Scotland's U15s. Alongside him in that England U15 squad was his fellow Ashleigh school pupil John Beresford. A third pupil from Sheffield was also in that England squad: Fraser Digby of Jordanthorpe School. The trio were key members of the Sheffield Boys U15s team along with Scott Sellers of Hinde House School and Steven Harris of Abbeydale Grange School that won the ESFA Inter Association Trophy in that year, the boys also played for the Sheffield Sunday League team Throstles.

The England starting line up that day was: 1. Darren Heyes; 2. Alan Spiers; 3. Michael Thomas; 4. Mark Seagraves; 5. Simon Ratcliffe (captain); 6. Ian Sankey; 7. Dale Gordon; 8. Ian Fairbrother; 9. Darren Beckford; 10. Kevin Keen; 11. Tony Daws.

Daws also represented Yorkshire Boys in cricket, rugby and athletics and if he had not made it as a professional footballer he was tipped to have a promising future in athletics.

In Daws' childhood, a boy could not sign a contract with a club until age 14, and the big clubs would "court" the most talented boys in the country in the years leading up to their 14th birthday. Daws' pace, strength and predatory scoring had alerted the big clubs, and there were multiple eager to sign him.

== Playing career ==
=== Schoolboy contracts ===
Daws was spotted by a Manchester United scout and subsequently signed for the club, with his registration filed on his 14th birthday. One year later it occurred to him and his father, James, that he would have to be a truly exceptional player to make the Manchester United first team. In front of him in the pecking order were established first-team players Joe Jordan, Steve Coppell, Andy Ritchie, Mickey Thomas and Gary Birtles. Then there were the Youth Team players Norman Whiteside and Mark Hughes and the "unknowns" in the U16 and U15 age groups. Daws and his father decided to ask for his release from the club.

In 1981 following persuasion from Jimmy Sirrel (general manager) and Howard Wilkinson (Head Coach) of Notts County, Daws signed schoolboy forms for the Nottingham club. Sirrell had known of Daws from when he was the manager of Sheffield United in 1977, having watched him play for the Sheffield Boys team at United's training ground. Daws went on to play for Notts County's Youth (U18) team as a 15- and 16-year-old.

=== Notts County ===
Daws signed a two-year apprenticeship with Notts County upon leaving school in 1983. He made his reserve-team debut for County whilst still at school and went on to make his first-team debut whilst still an apprentice, aged 18. That first League appearance was on 9 March 1985 in a 1–2 loss at Birmingham City in the old Second Division. The following week Daws opened his goalscoring account in the second minute of a 4–1 away success against Cardiff City. He made seven appearances (6 + 1sub) that season, scoring one goal. The following season Daws made just the one substitute appearance. He was released at the end of the 1985–86 season following Notts County's relegation to the old Third Division.

=== Sheffield United ===
Daws moved to Second Division club Sheffield United on a free transfer for the 1986–87 season. He made his debut for his hometown club on 8 November 1986, scoring both goals in a 2–0 win at Blackburn Rovers for Billy McEwan's Blades team. Daws made eleven appearances for the club that season, scoring three goals. His contract was for only one year, and it was not renewed at the end of the season. Once again Daws was on the free-transfer list.

=== Scunthorpe United ===
The 1987–88 season saw Daws playing for Scunthorpe United in the Fourth Division. Daws made the short journey to North Lincolnshire to sign for new manager Mick Buxton in the summer of 1987. He made his debut for The Iron in the opening game of the season, a 3–0 home league win over Tranmere Rovers on 15 August 1987. It was during his time at Scunthorpe that he incurred the back injury that was to bring his playing career to a relatively early end.

=== Later career ===
On leaving Scunthorpe Daws moved to Grimsby Town, then Lincoln City, Halifax Town, Scarborough and Altrincham before his back problems forced him to retire from playing at a relatively early age.

== Coaching career ==
After retiring he took up coaching positions at Sheffield United as part-time youth development officer (1996–2000), then assistant academy and U19 coach (2001–2004) before becoming under-nine to under-18 youth development officer at Sheffield Wednesday (2004–05).

He has been the academy manager at Scunthorpe United since 2005, and was appointed caretaker manager on 16 March 2011, following the sacking of manager Ian Baraclough, managing one game, a defeat at Ipswich Town on 19 March, before the appointment of Alan Knill on 31 March 2011. Following the sacking of Keith Hill, Daws was appointed interim manager of the financially troubled club (which was now in the National League) for a second time in September 2022, overseeing a six-game unbeaten run in the league at the start of his tenure, but by mid November, following a home defeat to fellow strugglers Maidstone United, Scunthorpe were 22nd, third from bottom of the National League. On 28 November 2022, Daws stepped down to return to his role as academy manager; the first team had won just twice during his tenure and were in 23rd position, six points from safety, with only goal difference preventing them from being bottom of the league. In April 2023, new club owner David Hilton announced that, to save costs, the club would be closing its academy.
