= Barry Siddall =

English footballer (born 1954)

Personal information
- Full name: Barry Alfred Siddall
- Date of birth: 12 September 1954 (age 72)
- Place of birth: Ellesmere Port, England
- Height: 6 ft 1 in (1.85 m)
- Position: Goalkeeper

Youth career
- 1970–1972: Bolton Wanderers

Senior career*
Years	Team	Apps	(Gls)
1972–1976	Bolton Wanderers	137	(0)
1976–1982	Sunderland	167	(0)
1980–1981	→ Darlington (loan)	8	(0)
1981	→ Vancouver Whitecaps (loan)	24	(0)
1982–1984	Port Vale	81	(0)
1983–1984	→ Blackpool (loan)	7	(0)
1984–1986	Stoke City	20	(0)
1985–1986	→ Tranmere Rovers (loan)	12	(0)
1985–1986	→ Manchester City (loan)	6	(0)
1986–1989	Blackpool	110	(0)
1989–1990	Stockport County	21	(0)
1990	Hartlepool United	11	(0)
1990	West Bromwich Albion	0	(0)
1990	Mossley	4	(0)
1990–1991	Carlisle United	24	(0)
1991–1992	Chester City	9	(0)
1992–1993	Preston North End	1	(0)
199?–199?	→ Lincoln City (loan)	0	(0)
1993	Northwich Victoria	2	(0)
1995	Burnley	0	(0)
1995	Birmingham City	0	(0)
Total		640	(0)

International career
1973	England Youth	7	(0)
- * Club domestic league appearances and goals

Barry Alfred Siddall (born 12 September 1954) is an English former professional football goalkeeper. When he retired from the game he had 614 appearances over a 21-year career in the Football League, playing for numerous clubs. He played for 13 different Football League clubs: Bolton Wanderers, Sunderland, Darlington, Port Vale, Blackpool, Stoke City, Tranmere Rovers, Manchester City, Stockport County, Hartlepool United, Carlisle United, Chester City and Preston North End. He won promotion out of the Second Division, Third Division, and Fourth Division, and also played in the First Division.

== Career ==
Siddall was educated at Ellesmere Port Grammar school; where he was spotted by a Bolton scout, together with Paul Jones and Neil Whatmore. He played seven games for England Youth in 1973.

He began his career with Bolton Wanderers, turning professional in January 1972 after a two-year apprenticeship. In four years with the Burnden Park club he made 137 league appearances. Jimmy Armfield's "Trotters" won the Third Division title in the 1972–73 season, and finished mid-table in the Second Division in 1973–74 and 1974–75. Under the stewardship of Ian Greaves, they went on to finish fourth in 1975–76, one point behind promoted West Bromwich Albion.

In September 1976, he moved north-east to join Sunderland for a £80,000 fee, intending to replace retiring club legend Jimmy Montgomery. He made 167 league appearances for Jimmy Adamson's "Black Cats". The Roker Park club were relegated out of the First Division in 1976–77, and came close to winning promotion in 1977–78 and 1978–79 before they regained their top-flight status with a second-place finish under the stewardship of Ken Knighton in 1979–80; they finished just one point behind champions Leicester City. He was loaned out to Darlington during the 1980–81 season, who were managed by his former Sunderland boss Billy Elliott; Siddall played eight Fourth Division games at Feethams. Now managed by Alan Durban, Sunderland avoided relegation by one place and two points in 1981–82.

In August 1982, Siddall signed for John McGrath's Fourth Division Port Vale and went on to make 81 league appearances for the "Valiants" in a two spell. The first choice keeper in the 1982–83 promotion campaign, he was sidelined for three months after sustaining a knee injury in a 3–1 win over Bristol City at Ashton Gate on 27 December 1982; Neville Southall was signed on loan to take his place. Teammate and club legend Phil Sproson named Siddall as the club's best goalkeeper of the 1980s. However, he handed in his notice at Vale Park in October 1983 following a contract dispute, and was loaned to Sam Ellis's Blackpool. Despite only spending one month at Bloomfield Road, during his seven league games for the "Seasiders", Blackpool were the victor in six of them, which assisted in their finishing sixth in the Fourth Division. He ended the 1983–84 season with 45 appearances for Port Vale, though he could not prevent the club from suffering relegation out of the Third Division. He was in goal for Vale against Blackpool in a 1–1 draw on 18 September 1984. Still, his return to Bloomfield Road was unhappy as he injured his ankle. He featured just 12 times in the 1984–85 season, as new boss John Rudge preferred Chris Pearce.

Siddall was loaned out to Vale's rivals Stoke City in January 1985, and the move was made permanent two months later. He played 15 First Division games at the end of the 1984–85 season, though he could not prevent Bill Asprey's "Potters" from being relegated in last place. He featured in just five Second Division games at the Victoria Ground in the 1985–86 campaign, as new boss Mick Mills preferred Peter Fox. He was also loaned out to Frank Worthington's Tranmere Rovers and Billy McNeill's Manchester City during the season, keeping goal in 12 Fourth Division games at Prenton Park and playing six First Division games during his time at Maine Road.

In 1986, Siddall returned to Blackpool, this time permanently. Sam Ellis was still in charge of the Bloomfield Road club, now a division higher, and Siddall went on to make 37 appearances during the 1986–87 season, as the club finished ninth in the Third Division. He was also first-choice during 1987–88, making 38 appearances, but in 1988–89 he was dropped a couple of times in favour of his deputies, Gary Kelly and Vince O'Keefe. He still made 35 starts in the league but was sold at the end of the season to Stockport County.

Siddall went on the books of six clubs in four years: Hartlepool United, West Bromwich Albion, Mossley (where he played four Northern Premier League Premier Division games), Carlisle United, Chester City, Preston North End and Lincoln City. Leaving the Football League in 1993, he later played for Northwich Victoria, Horwich R.M.I. and Burnley. He was signed by Birmingham City manager Barry Fry on the mid-season transfer-deadline day in March 1995. He played a total of 614 Football League and two Conference games throughout his career, before becoming a freelance goalkeeping coach.

== Post-retirement ==
Upon retiring, Siddall worked for the Post Office in Kirkham, Lancashire.

== Career statistics ==
Appearances and goals by club, season and competition
Club	Season	League			FA Cup		League Cup		Other^{[A]}		Total	
Club	Season	Division	Apps	Goals	Apps	Goals	Apps	Goals	Apps	Goals	Apps	Goals
Bolton Wanderers	1972–73	Third Division	4	0	0	0	0	0	0	0	4	0
Bolton Wanderers	1973–74	Second Division	42	0	3	0	5	0	0	0	50	0
Bolton Wanderers	1974–75	Second Division	42	0	2	0	2	0	0	0	46	0
Bolton Wanderers	1975–76	Second Division	42	0	6	0	1	0	0	0	49	0
Bolton Wanderers	1976–77	Second Division	7	0	0	0	1	0	5	0	13	0
Bolton Wanderers	Total		137	0	11	0	9	0	5	0	162	0
Sunderland	1976–77	First Division	34	0	2	0	0	0	0	0	36	0
Sunderland	1977–78	Second Division	42	0	1	0	2	0	0	0	45	0
Sunderland	1978–79	Second Division	41	0	2	0	1	0	2	0	46	0
Sunderland	1979–80	Second Division	12	0	1	0	5	0	3	0	21	0
Sunderland	1980–81	First Division	15	0	0	0	0	0	0	0	15	0
Sunderland	1981–82	First Division	23	0	3	0	3	0	0	0	29	0
Sunderland	Total		167	0	9	0	11	0	5	0	192	0
Darlington (loan)	1980–81	Fourth Division	8	0	0	0	0	0	0	0	8	0
Vancouver Whitecaps (loan)	1981	NASL	24	0	—		—		—		24	0
Port Vale	1982–83	Fourth Division	33	0	1	0	2	0	0	0	36	0
Port Vale	1983–84	Third Division	39	0	1	0	3	0	2	0	45	0
Port Vale	1984–85	Fourth Division	9	0	1	0	1	0	1	0	12	0
Port Vale	Total		81	0	3	0	6	0	3	0	93	0
Blackpool (loan)	1983–84	Fourth Division	7	0	0	0	0	0	0	0	7	0
Stoke City	1984–85	First Division	15	0	0	0	0	0	0	0	15	0
Stoke City	1985–86	Second Division	5	0	0	0	0	0	0	0	5	0
Stoke City	Total		20	0	0	0	0	0	0	0	20	0
Tranmere Rovers (loan)	1985–86	Fourth Division	12	0	4	0	0	0	0	0	16	0
Manchester City (loan)	1985–86	First Division	6	0	0	0	0	0	0	0	6	0
Blackpool	1986–87	Third Division	37	0	1	0	2	0	1	0	41	0
Blackpool	1987–88	Third Division	38	0	6	0	4	0	2	0	50	0
Blackpool	1988–89	Third Division	35	0	3	0	5	0	6	0	49	0
Blackpool	Total		110	0	10	0	11	0	9	0	140	0
Stockport County	1989–90	Fourth Division	21	0	2	0	4	0	2	0	29	0
Hartlepool United	1989–90	Fourth Division	11	0	0	0	0	0	0	0	11	0
Mossley	1990–91	Northern Premier League; Premier Division	4	0	0	0	0	0	0	0	4	0
Carlisle United	1990–91	Fourth Division	24	0	0	0	0	0	1	0	25	0
Chester City	1991–92	Third Division	9	0	1	0	1	0	1	0	12	0
Preston North End	1992–93	Second Division	1	0	0	0	0	0	0	0	1	0
Career total			642	0	40	0	42	0	26	0	750	0

A. The "Other" column constitutes appearances and goals in the Anglo-Scottish Cup and Football League Trophy.

== Honours ==
Bolton Wanderers

- Football League Third Division: 1972–73

Sunderland

- Football League Second Division second-place promotion: 1979–80

Port Vale

- Football League Fourth Division third-place promotion: 1982–83
