= Eamonn O'Keefe =

English-Irish footballer (born 1953)

Personal information
- Full name: Eamonn Gerard O'Keefe
- Date of birth: 13 October 1953 (age 73)
- Place of birth: Manchester, England
- Height: 5 ft 7 in (1.70 m)
- Positions: Midfielder; forward

Youth career
- 1974: Stalybridge Celtic

Senior career*
Years	Team	Apps	(Gls)
1974	Plymouth Argyle	0	(0)
1975–1976	Hyde United	19	(12)
1976	Al-Hilal		
1976–1979	Mossley	83	(34)
1979–1982	Everton	40	(6)
1982–1983	Wigan Athletic	58	(25)
1983–1985	Port Vale	59	(17)
1985–1986	Blackpool	36	(23)
1987–1988	Cork City	34	(9)
1989	St Patrick's Athletic	6	(0)
1989–1990	Chester City	17	(4)
1990–1991	Bangor City	3	(0)

International career
1979	England Semi-Pro	2	(1)
1983	Republic of Ireland U21	4	(4)
1981–1985	Republic of Ireland	5	(1)

Managerial career
- 1987–1988: Cork City (player-manager)
- * Club domestic league appearances and goals

Eamonn Gerard O'Keefe (born 13 October 1953) is a former professional footballer. He played as a forward, but in later years was moved into a midfield role.

He moved from non-League Stalybridge Celtic to Plymouth Argyle, and back into the non-League scene with Hyde United in 1975. The next year, he moved to Saudi Arabia to play for Al-Hilal before returning to England in 1976 to sign with Mossley. His 1978–79 Northern Premier League success at the club won him a move to Everton in 1979, before he was sold to Wigan Athletic in 1982, who were on the verge of promotion into the Third Division. He switched to Port Vale the next year before penning a deal with Blackpool in 1985. His goals took the club out of the Fourth Division in 1984–85. In 1987, he was appointed player-manager at Cork City, where he won the Munster Senior Cup and League of Ireland Cup in 1988. He moved to Chester City in 1989 after a spell with St Patrick's Athletic. He joined Bangor City the next year before retiring in 1991.

An England Semi-Pro international, he also won four under-21s caps for the Republic of Ireland and five senior caps between 1981 and 1985, scoring one goal at full international level.

== Early life ==
O'Keefe was born and raised in Blackley, in the city of Manchester. He went to school with Mike Pickering, who later found fame as a musician.

O'Keefe's father ran a football school for the priest of the local church, and O'Keefe would accompany him to matches to assist in the setting up of the equipment. He also played for his school's football team. He was one of three boys from his school who were chosen to represent Manchester Boys. O'Keefe came home one day, Joe Armstrong, the chief scout for Manchester United, was in his living room with O'Keefe's father. Armstrong wanted O'Keefe to be a ball boy for the club. Two weeks later, he was in the role in front of the Stretford End at Old Trafford.

== Club career ==
With his role as a ball boy, O'Keefe was on course to join the Manchester United youth team when he broke his leg in a collision with David Allison, son of Malcolm Allison, in a regional schoolboy game. Upon his recovery, he joined Stalybridge Celtic, of the Cheshire County League, who were managed by George Smith. He played as a right-back, before being moved into midfield, and he won the club's Player of the Year award. This won him a chance in the Football League, and he turned down Crystal Palace to instead sign with Third Division club Plymouth Argyle in February 1974. He was told by manager Tony Waiters that he would never be anything more than a fringe player in the professional game, who then allowed him to leave Home Park on a free transfer. He returned to Manchester and signed with Hyde United for the 1975–76 season. He scored on his Cheshire County League debut for the club in a 5–3 defeat at Nantwich Town. He scored four goals in a 6–3 victory over Rhyl at Ewen Fields. In total, he scored 19 goals in 36 appearances for the club.

In November 1975, he flew out to Saudi Arabia for a trial at top-flight Al-Hilal, managed by George Smith, who offered him the chance to earn a tax-free contract in the oil-rich nation. He impressed on the trial and was offered a contract, this made him the first European to play professionally in Saudi Arabia. Club president, Prince Abdullah bin Nasser bin Abdulaziz Al Saud, bought O'Keefe a Pontiac Ventura, before taking the young player on a luxurious tour of Europe, visiting five-star hotels in London, Paris, Cannes, and Rome, before returning to Riyadh for the start of the new Saudi season of football. However, on the trip he asked O'Keefe to give up his football career to become his lover, and was refused. As Prince Abdullah was a wealthy and powerful man in Saudi Arabia, (Note: A member of the ruling House of Saud, Abdullah was a younger son of Prince Abdullah bin Nasser bin Abdulaziz Al Saud, half-brother of the then reigning monarch of Saudi Arabia.) out of fear for his safety, O'Keefe fled the kingdom. As he needed Abdullah's permission to leave, O'Keefe had to convince him that he was only going to stay in England for one week so as to visit his ill father (who was in fact in good health). Upon return he informed FBA, who advised him after convening an emergency meeting on issue.

As the Saudi affair was being resolved, Mossley A.F.C. manager Bob Murphy offered O'Keefe a contract at the Northern Premier League club. In December 1976, he duly signed for Mossley after the Saudi club eventually agreed to release him from his contract. Howard Wilkinson was appointed as Mossley's manager in 1976, only for Murphy to return the following year. Wilkinson used O'Keefe as a left-back, though Murphy decided to play him an attacking midfielder due to his 'pace, power and eye for goal'. Under Murphy, the club won the Northern Premier League and Premier League Cup double in 1978–79 – this was the club's first significant success in seventy years. A part-time player, he also worked as a van driver for the Manchester Evening News.

O'Keefe was signed by Gordon Lee at First Division side Everton for a £25,000 fee. He received a red card in the Merseyside derby, after a late challenge on Liverpool's Ronnie Whelan. He played in the derby again on 24 January 1981, in an FA Cup third round clash, and unwittingly set up Imre Varadi for Everton's second goal of a 2–1 win. He went on to score the only goal of the fourth round replay against Southampton at Goodison Park; however, Manchester City knocked Everton out at the quarter-final stage, whilst O'Keefe broke his leg in a game against Manchester United.

O'Keefe recovered in time for the club's pre-season tour of Japan and the United States and was rewarded with a new two-year contract. However, he found himself on the bench in the 1981–82 season under new manager Howard Kendall, and put in a transfer request. He was then transferred to Wigan Athletic for a £65,000 fee in January 1982, signing a four-year contract. Under manager Larry Lloyd the "Latics" won promotion out of the Fourth Division in third place in 1981–82. He helped Wigan to consolidate their Third Division status in 1982–83. He was transfer-listed after the club went into liquidation, his wages being too high for the club to sustain.

In July 1983, John McGrath's Port Vale paid £10,000 for his services. With eleven goals in 43 games, he was the club's top scorer and Player of the Year in his debut season. The day after picking up his award, he put in a transfer request because Vale had been relegated. O'Keefe had also taken a dislike towards new manager John Rudge, as well as the lengthy daily commute from his home to Vale Park. During the following season, he played less regularly but carried two children to safety when a perimeter fence collapsed during an FA Cup 2–1 win at Macclesfield Town on 17 November 1984. On 25 March 1985, he refused to play for the "Vale" against Wrexham because he was due to play for his country, against England at Wembley, the following night. Rudge had asked O'Keefe to drop out of the Ireland squad, but O'Keefe refused. O'Keefe started the international.

Three days later, on 28 March, he joined Sam Ellis's Blackpool for £17,500. New teammate Mike Walsh answered a call from an official at Blackpool's rivals Preston North End and, impersonating O'Keefe, turned down the approach. He made his debut for the "Seasiders" two days later, in a 4–2 victory over Peterborough United at Bloomfield Road, scoring Blackpool's fourth goal. With Blackpool second in the table, he scored against leaders Chesterfield in his second appearance for the club. He went on to score four more goals in ten games before the end of the campaign, at which point Blackpool won promotion to Third Division.

The following season, 1985–86, O'Keefe scored 17 goals in 19 league starts (including a hat-trick in a 4–0 home win over Doncaster Rovers on 1 October 1985). With 17 goals, he finished the season as the club's top scorer. After only two games in 1986–87, O'Keefe announced his retirement from professional football due to injury. His final game for Blackpool came on 6 September 1986, in a 2–1 home defeat by Carlisle United. He was awarded a testimonial match as the summer wound down, with First Division champions Everton visiting Bloomfield Road. He repaid the favour in August 1987, when O'Keefe organised a fun run to raise £15,000 for Blackpool F.C. The club was in great financial trouble then.

Upon the recommendation of Harry McNally, O'Keefe was appointed as manager of Cork City, a club in the League of Ireland Premier Division. He appointed former Blackpool coach Billy Haydock as his assistant, and signed Blackpool goalkeeper Phil Harrington for a small fee. Also coming out of retirement as a player, his team won the pre-season Munster Senior Cup. He then signed former Stoke City defender Alan Dodd on a month-long deal. O'Keefe also doubled up as the club's commercial manager, and he arranged four Sportsman's Dinner events, with special guests as Jack Charlton, Sir Alex Ferguson, Tommy Docherty, and Emlyn Hughes. The club finished in seventh place in 1987–88 and lifted the League of Ireland Cup. Cork were heading to another mid-table place finish in 1988–89 when O'Keefe was sacked. Cork terminated his contract to cut costs, as the directors were forced to subsidise the club out of their own pockets. Following his dismissal he turned out for Brian Kerr's St Patrick's Athletic in a handful of games.

In March 1989, he came out of professional retirement to sign for Chester City, then managed by friend and former colleague Harry McNally. The signing was delayed due to lengthy negotiations with the Football League over his insurance payout two years earlier. He was also appointed as the club's commercial manager, and attempted to form a football pool for the entire Football League, in conjunction with the FA and the Daily Mirror; however, he could not break the Littlewoods monopoly due to a law that specifically banned newspapers from becoming involved in a pools game – O'Keefe believed that this arrangement "reeked of corruption". On the playing side, his Chester debut came at his former club, Blackpool, on 18 March 1989; he came off the bench to score in a 1–1 draw, denying Blackpool two points in their battle against relegation. Although he appeared in every game until the end of the season and became the club's penalty taker, O'Keefe only featured in three more matches in 1989–90 and drifted out of professional football circles, signing for Bangor City.

== International career ==
O'Keefe became an England semi-pro international, playing against Scotland and the Netherlands in a tournament in May 1979, scoring the winning goal against the Dutch in the final.

In January 1981, the FAI arranged for him to be given an Irish passport; he qualified for the Republic of Ireland because his father was born in Ireland. He made his debut in a 3–1 defeat to Wales at Tolka Park in Dublin. After the game, he was informed by FIFA that he would not be permitted to play other international games as he had voided himself from the Ireland team due to his England semi-pro appearances, and that he had voided himself from the England team due to his appearance for Ireland.

In the summer of 1983, FIFA agreed to permit him to play for Ireland again, so he travelled to Toulouse in France to play as an over-age player with the Republic of Ireland under-21s in a friendly tournament. His four goals against the Chinese made him the competition's leading scorer, and his performances in his three other games impressed the management team of Eoin Hand and Terry Conroy enough to win him a place in the senior team.

He was selected to play for the Ireland senior team in the 1984 Kirin Cup and scored the only goal of the semi-final tie with China. However, the Irish lost 2–1 to Brazilian side Internacional in the final. He also played in a 1–0 win over the Soviet Union in a World Cup qualifier at Lansdowne Road on 12 September 1984, as he came on for Mickey Walsh as an 80th-minute substitute. On 26 March 1985, he played for Ireland in a friendly against England at Wembley; the English won 2–1, with Gary Lineker scoring his first international goal. This would be the last of his five senior caps.

== Legacy and personal life ==
O'Keefe was inducted into the Hall of Fame at Bloomfield Road when it was officially opened by former Blackpool player Jimmy Armfield in April 2006. Organised by the Blackpool Supporters Association, Blackpool fans around the world voted on their all-time heroes. Five players from each decade are inducted; O'Keefe is in the 1980s.

After retiring from football he became a social worker, helping adults with disabilities and special needs and children in care. O'Keefe lived in the Portuguese town of Vilamoura, where he worked for Monarch Property Group, with his wife, Lorna. His son, Paul, was a youth team player at Manchester United, but he failed to make the grade and never turned professional.

As of April 2019, O'Keefe was semi-retired, living near Manchester and working part-time for former club Everton.

== Autobiography ==
In 2010, he released his autobiography, entitled ... I Only Wanted to Play Football. The foreword is written by Fred Eyre, his manager at Stalybridge Celtic. He decided to write the book under persuasion by wife Lorna, who also edited it.

== Career statistics ==
=== Club statistics ===
Appearances and goals by club, season and competition
Club	Season	League			FA Cup		Other		Total	
Club	Season	Division	Apps	Goals	Apps	Goals	Apps	Goals	Apps	Goals
Hyde United	1975–76	Cheshire County League	19	12	2	1	15	6	36	19
Everton	1979–80	First Division	4	0	0	0	1	0	5	0
Everton	1980–81	First Division	25	3	4	1	1	0	30	4
Everton	1981–82	First Division	11	3	1	0	4	1	16	4
Everton	Total		40	6	5	1	6	1	51	8
Wigan Athletic	1981–82	Fourth Division	22	9	0	0	0	0	22	9
Wigan Athletic	1982–83	Third Division	36	16	0	0	3	1	39	17
Wigan Athletic	Total		58	25	0	0	3	1	61	26
Port Vale	1983–84	Third Division	37	10	1	0	5	1	43	11
Port Vale	1984–85	Fourth Division	22	7	3	1	2	0	27	8
Port Vale	Total		59	17	4	1	7	1	70	19
Blackpool	1984–85	Fourth Division	12	6	0	0	0	0	12	6
Blackpool	1985–86	Third Division	22	17	0	0	2	0	24	17
Blackpool	1986–87	Third Division	2	0	0	0	0	0	2	0
Blackpool	Total		36	23	0	0	2	0	38	23
Chester City	1988–89	Third Division	14	4	0	0	0	0	14	4
Chester City	1989–90	Third Division	3	0	0	0	0	0	3	0
Chester City	Total		17	4	0	0	0	0	17	4
Cork City	1987–88	League of Ireland Premier Division	25	7						
Career total			254	94	11	3	33	9	298	106

=== International statistics ===
Republic of Ireland national team
Year	Apps	Goals
1981	1	0
1984	3	1
1985	1	0
Total	5	1

== Honours ==
Individual

- Stalybridge Celtic F.C. Player of the Year: 1974
- Port Vale F.C. Player of the Year: 1984

Mossley

- Northern Premier League: 1978–79
- Premier League Cup: 1979

Wigan Athletic

- Football League Fourth Division promotion (in third place): 1981–82

Blackpool

- Football League Fourth Division promotion (as runners-up): 1984–85

Cork City

- Munster Senior Cup: 1988
- League of Ireland Cup: 1988

== See also ==
- List of Republic of Ireland international footballers born outside the Republic of Ireland
