= Chris Thompson (footballer, born 1960) =

English footballer (1960–2012)

Personal information
- Full name: Christopher David Thompson
- Date of birth: 24 January 1960
- Place of birth: Walsall, England
- Date of death: 5 June 2012 (aged 52)
- Place of death: Tipton, England
- Height: 5 ft 11 in (1.80 m)
- Positions: Midfielder; forward

Youth career
- Bolton Wanderers

Senior career*
| Years | Team | Apps | (Gls) |
| 1977–1983 | Bolton Wanderers | 73 | (18) |
| 1983 | → Lincoln City (loan) | 6 | (0) |
| 1983–1986 | Blackburn Rovers | 85 | (24) |
| 1986–1988 | Wigan Athletic | 74 | (12) |
| 1988–1990 | Blackpool | 39 | (8) |
| 1990 | Cardiff City | 2 | (0) |
| 1991 | Walsall | 3 | (0) |

International career
| 1977 | England Youth | 2 | (0) |
- * Club domestic league appearances and goals

Christopher Thompson (24 January 1960 – 5 June 2012) was an English footballer who played as a midfielder or a forward.

== Career ==
Thompson was born in Walsall, West Midlands, on 24 January 1960. He started his career at Bolton Wanderers, signing professional terms with the club in 1977 after impressing in the club's youth teams. He debuted for the club on 25 October 1977 in a League Cup match against Peterborough United. His first league appearance for the club came during the 1979–80 season, appearing as a substitute in a 3–1 defeat against Coventry City. He made 81 appearances in all competitions for Bolton, scoring 20 goals, before being transferred to Blackburn Rovers in 1983.

During his three-year spell at Blackburn, Thompson made 100 appearances and scored 26 goals before moving to Wigan Athletic in 1986. In his fourth league game for Wigan, he scored a hat-trick in a 5–1 win against his hometown club Walsall. He scored nine goals during the 1986–87 season, helping the club reach the inaugural Football League play-offs. Despite Thompson scoring the opening goal in the first leg of the play-off semi-final against Swindon Town, the club lost the game 3–2 and would ultimately be knocked out by the same scoreline on aggregate. Thompson also played an important role in the club's 1986–87 FA Cup run, scoring in the Second and Third Round against Darlington and Gillingham. He also scored the opening goal in the Fifth Round match against Hull City, which Wigan went on to win 3–0, reaching the quarter-finals for the first time in their history.

In 1988, Thompson joined Sam Ellis' Blackpool. In his first season at Bloomfield Road, he made 36 League appearances and scored eight goals. The following season, 1989–90, under Jimmy Mullen, who had taken over with five games remaining of the previous term, Thompson made three appearances before being sold to Cardiff City.

He made only five more League appearances (two for Cardiff and three for Walsall) before retiring in 1991 at 31.

== Death ==
Thompson was found dead at his flat in Anderson Gardens, Tipton, on 5 June 2012. An inquest into his death six months later failed to identify a specific cause of death. Still, the pathologist had discovered cirrhosis of the liver, and due to the decomposed state of his body, he may have died several weeks before his body was discovered. His sister, Maureen Bradshaw, told the coroner that he had struggled with depression in later life and was a heavy drinker.
