= 1988–89 Carlisle United F.C. season =

Carlisle United F.C.
1988–89 season
- Manager: Clive Middlemass
- Stadium: Brunton Park
- Fourth Division: 12th
- FA Cup: Third round
- League Cup: First round
- Football League Trophy: Group stage

For the 1988–89 season, Carlisle United F.C. competed in Football League Division Four.

== Results & fixtures ==
=== Football League Fourth Division ===
==== League table ====
Pos	Team	Pld	W	D	L	GF	GA	GD	Pts
10	Lincoln City (Note: New club in the league)	46	18	10	18	64	60	+4	64
11	York City	46	17	13	16	62	63	−1	64
12	Carlisle United	46	15	15	16	53	52	+1	60
13	Exeter City	46	18	6	22	65	68	−3	60
14	Torquay United	46	17	8	21	45	60	−15	59

==== Matches ====
Match Day	Date	Opponent	H/A	Score	Carlisle United Scorer(s)	Attendance
1	27 August	Peterborough United	H	2–2		
2	3 September	York City	A	1–1		
3	10 September	Tranmere Rovers	H	1–1		
4	16 September	Halifax Town	A	3–3		
5	20 September	Scunthorpe United	A	1–1		
6	24 September	Rotherham United	H	0–2		
7	30 September	Cambridge United	A	2–3		
8	4 October	Colchester United	H	1–2		
9	8 October	Hereford United	A	1–2		
10	15 October	Torquay United	H	2–1		
11	22 October	Exeter City	A	0–3		
12	25 October	Burnley	H	0–0		
13	29 October	Lincoln City	A	2–0		
18	5 November	Scarborough	H	0–1		
14	8 November	Leyton Orient	A	0–2		
15	12 November	Darlington	H	1–2		
16	26 November	Grimsby Town	H	2–1		
17	3 December	Wrexham	A	1–2		
19	17 December	Hartlepool United	A	2–0		
20	26 December	Rochdale	H	1–0		
21	31 December	Stockport County	H	1–1		
22	2 January	Crewe Alexandra	A	0–1		
23	10 January	Doncaster Rovers	A	3–1		
24	14 January	York City	H	0–0		
25	21 January	Peterborough United	A	4–1		
26	28 January	Halifax Town	H	3–1		
27	4 February	Scunthorpe United	H	0–3		
28	11 February	Rotherham United	A	1–2		
29	18 February	Hereford United	H	3–0		
30	4 March	Exeter City	H	1–0		
31	11 March	Scarborough	A	1–0		
32	14 March	Lincoln City	H	2–1		
33	17 March	Tranmere Rovers	A	0–0		
34	21 March	Burnley	A	0–0		
35	25 March	Crewe Alexandra	H	0–1		
36	27 March	Rochdale	A	0–0		
37	1 April	Hartlepool United	H	2–1		
38	4 April	Doncaster Rovers	H	0–1		
39	7 April	Stockport County	A	1–1		
40	15 April	Cambridge United	H	1–1		
41	21 April	Colchester United	A	1–1		
42	29 April	Grimsby Town	A	0–0		
43	1 May	Leyton Orient	H	2–1		
44	3 May	Torquay United	A	0–1		
45	6 May	Wrexham	H	1–2		
46	13 May	Darlington	A	3–2		

=== Football League Cup ===
Round	Date	Opponent	H/A	Score	Carlisle United Scorer(s)	Attendance
R1 L1	30 August	Blackpool	H	1–1		2,336
R1 L2	6 September	Blackpool	A	0–3		2,955

=== FA Cup ===
Round	Date	Opponent	H/A	Score	Carlisle United Scorer(s)	Attendance
R1	19 November	Telford United	A	1–1		2,163
R1 R	22 November	Telford United	H	4–1		2,833
R2	10 December	Scarborough	A	1–0		2,849
R3	7 January	Liverpool	H	0–3		18,556

=== Football League Trophy ===
Round	Date	Opponent	H/A	Score	Carlisle United Scorer(s)	Attendance
GS	29 November	Scarborough	H	1–1		1,437
GS	6 December	Darlington	A	2–3		867
