= 1990–91 Carlisle United F.C. season =

Carlisle United F.C.
1990–91 season
- Manager: Clive Middlemass (to March); Aidan McCaffery (caretaker manager)
- Stadium: Brunton Park
- Fourth Division: 20th
- FA Cup: First round
- League Cup: Second round
- Football League Trophy: Group stage

For the 1990–91 season, Carlisle United F.C. competed in Football League Division Four.

== Results & fixtures ==
=== Football League Fourth Division ===
==== League table ====
| Pos | Team | Pld | W | D | L | GF | GA | GD | Pts |
|---|---|---|---|---|---|---|---|---|---|
| 18 | Chesterfield | 46 | 13 | 14 | 19 | 47 | 62 | −15 | 53 |
| 19 | Maidstone United | 46 | 13 | 12 | 21 | 66 | 71 | −5 | 51 |
| 20 | Carlisle United | 46 | 13 | 9 | 24 | 47 | 89 | −42 | 48 |
| 21 | York City | 46 | 11 | 13 | 22 | 45 | 57 | −12 | 46 |
| 22 | Halifax Town | 46 | 12 | 10 | 24 | 59 | 79 | −20 | 46 |

==== Matches ====
| Match Day | Date | Opponent | H/A | Score | Carlisle United Scorer(s) | Attendance |
|---|---|---|---|---|---|---|
| 1 | 25 August | Doncaster Rovers | H | 2–3 | | |
| 2 | 1 September | Peterborough United | A | 1–1 | | |
| 3 | 8 September | Maidstone United | H | 1–0 | | |
| 4 | 15 September | Hereford United | A | 2–4 | | |
| 5 | 17 September | Stockport County | A | 1–3 | | |
| 6 | 22 September | Hartlepool United | H | 1–0 | | |
| 7 | 28 September | Burnley | H | 1–1 | | |
| 8 | 2 October | Gillingham | A | 1–2 | | |
| 9 | 6 October | Walsall | A | 1–1 | | |
| 10 | 13 October | Halifax Town | H | 0–3 | | |
| 11 | 20 October | Chesterfield | H | 1–0 | | |
| 12 | 24 October | Scarborough | A | 1–1 | | |
| 13 | 27 October | Torquay United | A | 0–3 | | |
| 14 | 3 November | Lincoln City | H | 0–0 | | |
| 15 | 10 November | York City | H | 1–0 | | |
| 16 | 24 November | Rochdale | A | 1–0 | | |
| 17 | 1 December | Wrexham | A | 0–1 | | |
| 18 | 15 December | Northampton Town | H | 4–1 | | |
| 19 | 23 December | Blackpool | H | 1–0 | | |
| 20 | 26 December | Cardiff City | A | 1–3 | | |
| 21 | 29 December | Scunthorpe United | A | 0–2 | | |
| 22 | 1 January | Aldershot | H | 1–2 | | |
| 23 | 5 January | Darlington | A | 1–3 | | |
| 24 | 12 January | Peterborough United | H | 3–2 | | |
| 25 | 19 January | Doncaster Rovers | A | 0–4 | | |
| 26 | 26 January | Hereford United | H | 0–1 | | |
| 27 | 2 February | Stockport County | H | 1–0 | | |
| 28 | 5 February | Hartlepool United | A | 1–4 | | |
| 29 | 16 February | Rochdale | H | 1–1 | | |
| 30 | 23 February | York City | A | 0–2 | | |
| 31 | 26 February | Darlington | H | 0–2 | | |
| 32 | 2 March | Wrexham | H | 2–0 | | |
| 33 | 9 March | Northampton Town | A | 1–1 | | |
| 34 | 12 March | Gillingham | H | 0–4 | | |
| 35 | 16 March | Burnley | A | 1–2 | | |
| 36 | 19 March | Halifax Town | A | 1–1 | | |
| 37 | 23 March | Walsall | H | 0–3 | | |
| 38 | 30 March | Cardiff City | H | 3–2 | | |
| 39 | 2 April | Blackpool | A | 0–6 | | |
| 40 | 6 April | Scunthorpe United | H | 0–3 | | |
| 41 | 13 April | Aldershot | A | 0–3 | | |
| 42 | 20 April | Chesterfield | A | 1–4 | | |
| 43 | 27 April | Scarborough | H | 4–1 | | |
| 44 | 1 May | Maidstone United | A | 0–0 | | |
| 45 | 4 May | Torquay United | H | 3–1 | | |
| 46 | 11 May | Lincoln City | A | 2–6 | | |

=== Football League Cup ===
| Round | Date | Opponent | H/A | Score | Carlisle United Scorer(s) | Attendance |
|---|---|---|---|---|---|---|
| R1 L1 | 28 August | Scunthorpe United | H | 1–0 | | |
| R1 L2 | 4 September | Scunthorpe United | A | 1–1 | | |
| R2 L1 | 25 September | Derby County | H | 1–1 | | |
| R2 L1 | 10 October | Derby County | A | 0–1 | | |

=== FA Cup ===
| Round | Date | Opponent | H/A | Score | Carlisle United Scorer(s) | Attendance |
|---|---|---|---|---|---|---|
| R1 | 17 November | Wigan Athletic | A | 0–5 | | |

=== Football League Trophy ===
| Round | Date | Opponent | H/A | Score | Carlisle United Scorer(s) | Attendance |
|---|---|---|---|---|---|---|
| GS | 6 November | Preston North End | H | 1–1 | | |
| GS | 18 December | Rochdale | A | 1–0 | | |
