= James O'Keefe (disambiguation) =

James O'Keefe may refer to:

- Vince O'Keefe (James Vincent O'Keefe, born 1957), English footballer
- James O'Keefe (born 1984), American political activist

== See also ==
- James O'Keeffe (died 1926), Irish politician
- Jim O'Keeffe (born 1941), Irish politician
