= 1985–86 Blackpool F.C. season =

English football club season

Blackpool F.C.
1985–86 season
- Manager: Sam Ellis
- Division Three: 12th
- FA Cup: Second round
- League Cup: First round
- Top goalscorer: League: Eamon O'Keefe (17); All: Eamon O'Keefe (17)
Home colours

The 1985–86 season was Blackpool F.C.'s 78th season (75th consecutive) in the Football League. They competed in the 24-team Division Three, then the third tier of English league football, finishing twelfth.

Eamon O'Keefe was the club's top scorer, with seventeen goals.

== Table ==
Pos	Team	Pld	W	D	L	GF	GA	GD	Pts
10	Brentford	46	18	12	16	58	61	−3	66
11	Doncaster Rovers	46	16	16	14	45	52	−7	64
12	Blackpool	46	17	12	17	66	55	+11	63
13	Darlington	46	15	13	18	61	78	−17	58
14	Rotherham United	46	15	12	19	61	59	+2	57
