= Vince O'Keefe =

English footballer

Personal information
- Full name: James Vincent O'Keefe
- Date of birth: 2 April 1957 (age 69)
- Place of birth: Birmingham, England
- Height: 6 ft 2 in (1.88 m)
- Position: Goalkeeper

Senior career*
Years	Team	Apps	(Gls)
1974–1976	Birmingham City	0	(0)
1976	→ Peterborough United (loan)	0	(0)
1976–1977	Walsall	0	(0)
1977–1978	AP Leamington	42	(0)
1978–1980	Exeter City	53	(0)
1980–1982	Torquay United	108	(0)
1982–1989	Blackburn Rovers	68	(0)
1983	→ Bury (loan)	2	(0)
1986	→ Blackpool (loan)	1	(0)
1988	→ Blackpool (loan)	6	(0)
1989–1992	Wrexham	83	(0)
1992–1993	Exeter City	2	(0)
2001–2002	Rochdale	0	(0)
Total		365	(0)
- * Club domestic league appearances and goals

James Vincent O'Keefe (born 2 April 1957) is an English former professional footballer. He played as a goalkeeper for a number of Football League clubs between 1974 and 1993, making over 400 appearances.

== Career ==
=== Blackpool ===
O'Keefe had two loan stints at Blackpool during the 1980s. The first occurred during the 1986–87 campaign, when he deputised for Barry Siddall in a 4–1 victory at Chester City on 27 December.

Two years later, Sam Ellis brought him back for a further six League games.

=== Blackburn Rovers ===
A significant moment in O'Keefe's career was when he helped the Blackburn Rovers win the now defunct Full Members' Cup at the old Wembley Stadium, beating Charlton Athletic 1–0 in 1987. Vince is the father of current Chorley F.C. midfielder Josh O'Keefe.

== After Football ==
Vince became a financial consultant based around Nottingham and has acted as a financial advisor for the PFA. He is also a football agent to the likes of Ben Foster.

== Honours ==
Blackburn Rovers

- Full Members' Cup: 1986–87
