= Karl Austin =

English footballer

Personal information
- Full name: Karl Austin
- Date of birth: 7 August 1961 (age 65)
- Place of birth: Stoke-on-Trent, England
- Position: Goalkeeper

Youth career
- Stafford Rangers

Senior career*
Years	Team	Apps	(Gls)
1985	Port Vale	1	(0)
- Gresley Rovers
- * Club domestic league appearances and goals

Karl Austin (born 7 August 1961) is an English former footballer who played as a goalkeeper for Stafford Rangers, Port Vale and Gresley Rovers in the 1980s.

== Career ==
Austin played for Alliance Premier League club Stafford Rangers before joining John Rudge's Fourth Division side Port Vale on non-contract terms in February 1985. His rivals for the number one jersey were Barry Siddall and Chris Pearce. He played in a 3–3 draw with Scunthorpe United at the Old Showground on 10 May, the last day of the 1984–85 season, but was not signed to a permanent deal at Vale Park.

== Career statistics ==
Appearances and goals by club, season and competition
Club	Season	League			FA Cup		Other		Total	
Club	Season	Division	Apps	Goals	Apps	Goals	Apps	Goals	Apps	Goals
Port Vale	1984–85	Fourth Division	1	0	0	0	0	0	1	0
