= 1984–85 Blackpool F.C. season =

English football club season

Blackpool F.C.
1984–85 season
- Manager: Sam Ellis
- Division Four: 2nd (promoted)
- FA Cup: First round
- League Cup: Second round
- Top goalscorer: League: John Deary (13); All: John Deary (15)
Home colours

The 1984–85 season was Blackpool F.C.'s 77th season (74th consecutive) in the Football League. They competed in the 24-team Division Four, then the bottom tier of English league football, finishing second. As a result, they were promoted to Division Three. As of 2020, this remains the last time they achieved automatic promotion.

John Deary was the club's top scorer, with fifteen goals (thirteen in the league and two in the League Cup).

== Table ==
Pos	Team	Pld	W	D	L	GF	GA	GD	Pts	Promotion
1	Chesterfield (C, P)	46	26	13	7	64	35	+29	91	Promotion to the Third Division
2	Blackpool (P)	46	24	14	8	73	39	+34	86	Promotion to the Third Division
3	Darlington (P)	46	24	13	9	66	49	+17	85	Promotion to the Third Division
4	Bury (P)	46	24	12	10	76	50	+26	84	Promotion to the Third Division
5	Hereford United	46	22	11	13	65	47	+18	77	

(C) Champions; (P) Promoted
