= 1980–81 Everton F.C. season =

English football club season

Everton
1980–81 season
- Chairman: Philip Carter
- Manager: Gordon Lee
- Ground: Goodison Park
- First Division: 15th
- FA Cup: Sixth Round
- League Cup: Third Round
- Top goalscorer: League: Peter Eastoe (15); All: Peter Eastoe (19)
Home colours	Away colours

During the 1980–81 English football season, Everton F.C. competed in the Football League First Division. They finished 15th in the table with 36 points.

== Final league table ==
Pos	Team	Pld	W	D	L	GF	GA	GD	Pts
13	Birmingham City	42	13	12	17	50	61	−11	38
14	Middlesbrough	42	16	5	21	53	61	−8	37
15	Everton	42	13	10	19	55	58	−3	36
16	Coventry City	42	13	10	19	48	68	−20	36
17	Sunderland	42	14	7	21	52	53	−1	35

Source: World Football
Rules for classification: 1) Points; 2) Goal difference; 3) Goals scored

== Results ==
Win	Draw	Loss

=== Football League First Division ===
Date	Opponent	Venue	Result	Scorers	Attendance
16 August 1980	Sunderland	A	1–3	Eastoe	32,005
19 August 1980	Leicester City	H	1–0	Eastoe	23,337
23 August 1980	Nottingham Forest	H	0–0	—	25,981
30 August 1980	Ipswich Town	A	0–4	—	20,879
6 September 1980	Wolverhampton Wanderers	H	2–0	Eastoe, Wright	21,820
13 September 1980	Aston Villa	A	2–0	Lyons, Eastoe	25,673
20 September 1980	Crystal Palace	H	5–0	Latchford (3), Gidman (pen.), Eastoe	26,950
27 September 1980	Coventry City	A	5–0	Eastoe, Latchford (2), McBride (2)	14,810
4 October 1980	Southampton	H	2–1	McBride (2, 2 pens.)	36,544
7 October 1980	Brighton & Hove Albion	A	3–1	McMahon, Lyons, McBride	16,523
11 October 1980	Leeds United	A	0–1	—	25,601
18 October 1980	Liverpool	H	2–2	Hartford, McBride	52,565
21 October 1980	West Bromiwch Albion	H	1–1	Eastoe	24,046
25 October 1980	Manchester United	A	0–2	—	54,260
1 November 1980	Tottenham Hotspur	H	2–2	Eastoe, McMahon	26,174
8 November 1980	Norwich City	A	1–2	Latchford	14,557
12 November 1980	Leicester City	A	1–0	Eastoe	15,511
15 November 1980	Sunderland	H	2–1	O'Keefe, Hartford	24,099
22 November 1980	Arsenal	A	1–2	Wright	30,911
29 November 1980	Birmingham City	H	1–1	O'Keefe	22,258
6 December 1980	Stoke City	D	2–2	McBride, Varadi	15,650
13 December 1980	Brighton & Hove Albion	H	4–3	Eastoe (2), McMahon, Varadi	19,157
26 December 1980	Manchester City	H	0–2	—	36,194
27 December 1980	Middlesbrough	A	0–1	—	20,210
10 January 1981	Arsenal	H	1–2	O'Keefe	29,360
17 January 1981	Ipswich Town	H	0–0	—	25,516
31 January 1981	Nottingham Forest	A	0–1	—	25,611
7 February 1981	Aston Villa	H	1–3	Ross (pen.)	31,434
21 February 1981	Coventry City	H	3–0	Ross, McMahon, Eastoe	26,731
28 February 1981	Crystal Palace	A	3–2	Eastoe, McMahon, Varadi	14,594
14 March 1981	Leeds United	H	1–2	Varadi	23,014
17 March 1981	Southampton	A	0–3	—	20,829
21 March 1981	Liverpool	A	0–1	—	49,743
28 March 1981	Manchester United	H	0–1	—	25,854
31 March 1981	West Bromwich Albion	A	0–2	—	14,833
4 April 1981	Tottenham Hotspur	A	2–2	Hartford, Varadi	27,208
11 April 1981	Norwich City	H	0–2	—	16,254
18 April 1981	Middlesbrough	H	4–1	Hartford (2, 1 pen.), Megson, Eastoe	15,706
20 April 1981	Manchester City	A	1–3	Varadi	34,434
25 April 1981	Stoke City	H	0–1	—	15,352
2 May 1981	Birmingham City	A	1–1	Eastoe	12,863
4 May 1981	Wolverhampton Wanderers	A	0–0	—	16,269

=== FA Cup ===
Round	Date	Opponent	Venue	Result	Scorers	Attendance
Third round	3 January 1981	Arsenal	H	2–0	Sansom (o.g.), Lyons,	34,240
Fourth round	24 January 1981	Liverpool	H	2–1	Eastoe, Varadi	53,084
Fifth round	14 February 1981	Southampton	A	0–0	—	24,152
Fifth round replay	17 February 1981	Southampton	H	1–0 (a.e.t.)	O'Keefe	49,192
Sixth round	14 February 1981	Manchester City	H	2–2	Eastoe, Ross (pen.)	52,791
Sixth round replay	17 February 1981	Manchester City	A	1–3	Eastoe	52,532

=== League Cup ===
Round	Date	Opponent	Venue	Result	Scorers	Attendance
Second round, first leg	26 August 1980	Blackpool	H	3–0	Eastoe, Latchford, McBride	20,156
Second round, second leg	3 September 1980	Blackpool	A	2–2	Latchford (2)	10,579
Third round	24 September 1980	West Bromwich Albion	H	1–2	Gidman	23,436

== Squad ==
Player Age Nat. Current club Contract Market value - Billy Wright Billy Wright Defence 23 England Retired - - - Gary Stanley Gary Stanley Midfield 27 England Retired - - - Paul Lodge Paul Lodge Midfield 20 England Retired - - - Seamus McDonagh Seamus McDonagh Goalkeeper 28 Ireland England Retired - - - Martin Hodge Martin Hodge Goalkeeper 22 England Retired - - - Kevin Ratcliffe Kevin Ratcliffe Centre-Back 20 Wales Retired - - - Mick Lyons Mick Lyons Centre-Back 29 England Retired - - - Mark Higgins Mark Higgins Centre-Back 22 England Retired - - - John Bailey John Bailey Left-Back 24 England Retired - - - John Gidman John Gidman Right-Back 27 England Retired - - - John Barton John Barton Right-Back 27 England Retired - - - Gary Megson Gary Megson Defensive Midfield 22 England Retired - - - Steve McMahon Steve McMahon Central Midfield 19 England Retired - - - Kevin Richardson Kevin Richardson Central Midfield 18 England Retired - - - Asa Hartford Asa Hartford Central Midfield 30 Scotland Retired - - - Trevor Ross Trevor Ross Central Midfield 24 Scotland Retired - - - Joe McBride Joe McBride Left Winger 20 Scotland Retired - - - Graeme Sharp Graeme Sharp Centre-Forward 20 Scotland Retired - - - Peter Eastoe Peter Eastoe Centre-Forward 27 England Retired - - - Bob Latchford Bob Latchford Centre-Forward 30 England Retired - - - Eamon O'Keefe Eamon O'Keefe Centre-Forward 27 Ireland Retired - - - Imre Varadi Imre Varadi Centre-Forward 21 England Hungary Retired - - - George Telfer George Telfer Centre-Forward 25 England Retired - -
