= Wayne Kerrins =

English footballer

Personal information
- Full name: Wayne Michael Kerrins
- Date of birth: 5 August 1965 (age 61)
- Place of birth: Brentwood, Essex, England
- Height: 5 ft 8 in (1.73 m)
- Position: Midfielder

Youth career
- Fulham

Senior career*
Years	Team	Apps	(Gls)
1984–1989	Fulham	66	(1)
1985	→ Port Vale (loan)	8	(0)
1988–1989	→ Leyton Orient (loan)	3	(0)
- Farnborough Town
- Dulwich Hamlet
- Kingstonian
- * Club domestic league appearances and goals

Wayne Michael Kerrins (born 5 August 1965) is an English former footballer who played for Fulham, Port Vale, Leyton Orient, Farnborough Town, Dulwich Hamlet and Kingstonian.

== Career ==
Kerrins started his career with Fulham, who finished the 1984–85 campaign in ninth place in the Second Division. He was sent out on loan to John Rudge's Port Vale in March 1985. He played eight Fourth Division games for the "Valiants" at the end of the 1984–85 season. Back with Ray Harford's "Cottagers", he was unable to prevent the club from being relegated in last place in 1985–86. New boss Ray Lewington then led Fulham to 18th in the Third Division in 1986–87 and ninth in 1987–88. He was loaned out to Frank Clark's Leyton Orient in the 1988–89 season and played three Fourth Division games for the "O's". His spell on Brisbane Road was brief, and he was released from his contract after returning to Craven Cottage. He moved on to Conference club Farnborough Town, and later Dulwich Hamlet and Kingstonian.

== Career statistics ==
Appearances and goals by club, season and competition
Club	Season	League			FA Cup		Other		Total	
Club	Season	Division	Apps	Goals	Apps	Goals	Apps	Goals	Apps	Goals
Fulham	1984–85	Second Division	2	0	0	0	0	0	2	0
Fulham	1985–86	Second Division	16	0	0	0	2	0	18	0
Fulham	1986–87	Third Division	30	1	4	0	6	0	40	1
Fulham	1987–88	Third Division	14	0	0	0	4	0	18	0
Fulham	1988–89	Third Division	4	0	0	0	1	0	5	0
Fulham	Total		66	1	4	0	13	0	83	1
Port Vale (loan)	1984–85	Fourth Division	8	0	0	0	0	0	8	0
Leyton Orient (loan)	1988–89	Fourth Division	3	0	0	0	0	0	3	0
