= Martyn Smith (footballer) =

English footballer

Personal information
- Full name: Martyn Christopher Smith
- Date of birth: 16 September 1961 (age 65)
- Place of birth: Stoke-on-Trent, England
- Position: Midfielder

Youth career
- Leek College

Senior career*
Years	Team	Apps	(Gls)
1981–1983	Leek Town	12	(1)
1983–1985	Port Vale	13	(1)
1985–1986	Macclesfield Town	24	(1)
1986	Eastwood		
1986–1995	Leek Town	189	(31)
- * Club domestic league appearances and goals

Martyn Christopher Smith (born 16 September 1961) is an English former footballer who played as a midfielder for Leek Town, Port Vale, Macclesfield Town, and Eastwood Hanley.

== Career ==
Smith played for Alsager College before joining Nantwich Town in September 1980. Moved to North West Counties League side Leek Town in November 1981 before signing for John Rudge's Port Vale in August 1984. He played 13 Fourth Division games and one FA Cup game in the 1984–85 season. His only goal in the Football League came on 28 December, in a 3–2 defeat to Colchester United at Layer Road. He was handed a free transfer away from Vale Park in May 1985. He moved on to Macclesfield Town of the Northern Premier League, becoming a first-team regular until losing his place when manager Neil Griffiths left in February 1986. He moved on to Eastwood, before moving back to old club Leek Town, later being appointed as Leek's assistant manager. Also served as Assistant Manager of Newcastle Town and Manager of Rocester.

== Career statistics ==
Appearances and goals by club, season and competition
Club	Season	League			FA Cup		Other		Total	
Club	Season	Division	Apps	Goals	Apps	Goals	Apps	Goals	Apps	Goals
Leek Town	1981–82	Cheshire County League	8	1	0	0	5	1	13	2
Leek Town	1982–83	North West Counties League; Division One	4	0	0	0	0	0	4	0
Leek Town	Total		12	1	0	0	5	1	17	2
Port Vale	1984–85	Fourth Division	13	1	0	0	4	0	17	1
Macclesfield Town	1985–86	Northern Premier League	24	1	1	0	5	0	30	1
Leek Town	1986–87	North West Counties League; Division One	18	1	0	0	2	0	20	1
Leek Town	1987–88	Northern Premier League; Division One	24	4	1	0	12	0	37	4
Leek Town	1988–89	Northern Premier League; Division One	31	15	8	1	11	5	50	21
Leek Town	1989–90	Northern Premier League; Division One	24	2	1	0	2	1	27	3
Leek Town	1990–91	Northern Premier League; Premier Division	9	2	0	0	2	0	11	2
Leek Town	1991–92	Northern Premier League; Premier Division	22	3	1	0	6	4	29	7
Leek Town	1992–93	Northern Premier League; Premier Division	24	3	3	2	4	0	31	5
Leek Town	1993–94	Northern Premier League; Premier Division	9	0	6	2	8	0	23	2
Leek Town	1994–95	Southern League; Premier Division	28	1	0	0	13	0	41	1
Leek Town	Total		189	31	20	5	60	10	269	46
