= Derek Monaghan =

English footballer

Personal information
- Full name: Derek James Monaghan
- Date of birth: 20 January 1959 (age 67)
- Place of birth: Bromsgrove, England
- Height: 5 ft 9 in (1.75 m)
- Position: Forward

Senior career*
Years	Team	Apps	(Gls)
1979–1984	West Bromwich Albion	19	(2)
1984–1985	Port Vale	7	(0)
- Redditch United
Total		26+	(2+)

International career
1977	England Youth	6	(0)
- * Club domestic league appearances and goals

Derek James Monaghan (born 20 January 1959) is an English former footballer who played as a forward for West Bromwich Albion, Port Vale, and Redditch United.

== Career ==
Monaghan started his career at West Bromwich Albion in 1979, having won seven caps for England Youth in 1977. During a five-year stay, he scored two goals in 19 First Division matches. He suffered with knee injuries at The Hawthorns. After two years on the sidelines, he returned to action in time to score a winning goal against Arsenal at Highbury in December 1983; however, he was again struck down by injury a week later. He played under four different managers: Ron Atkinson, Ronnie Allen, Ron Wylie, and Johnny Giles, before joining John Rudge's Port Vale in July 1984. He played seven Fourth Division and two cup games in the 1984–85 season, but suffered badly with injuries. He was given a free transfer in May 1985 and moved on to Redditch United. United won promotion out of the Southern Football League Midland Division in 1985–86.

== Post-retirement ==
After retiring as a footballer, Monaghan set up his own financial consultancy business in Warwickshire.

== Career statistics ==
Appearances and goals by club, season and competition
Club	Season	League			FA Cup		Other		Total	
Club	Season	Division	Apps	Goals	Apps	Goals	Apps	Goals	Apps	Goals
West Bromwich Albion	1979–80	First Division	4	0	0	0	1	0	5	0
West Bromwich Albion	1980–81	First Division	4	0	0	0	1	0	5	0
West Bromwich Albion	1981–82	First Division	8	1	1	0	2	1	11	2
West Bromwich Albion	1982–83	First Division	0	0	0	0	0	0	0	0
West Bromwich Albion	1983–84	First Division	3	1	0	0	0	0	3	1
West Bromwich Albion	Total		19	2	1	0	4	1	24	3
Port Vale	1984–85	Fourth Division	7	0	0	0	2	0	9	0

== Honours ==
Redditch United

- Southern Football League Midland Division second-place promotion: 1985–86
