= 1984–85 Port Vale F.C. season =

Port Vale F.C.
1984–85 season
- Chairman: Jim Lloyd
- Manager: John Rudge
- Stadium: Vale Park
- Football League Fourth Division: 12th (60 points)
- FA Cup: Third Round (eliminated by West Ham United)
- League Cup: Second Round (eliminated by Wolverhampton Wanderers)
- Associate Members' Cup: Second Round (eliminated by Bristol City)
- Player of the Year: Alan Webb
- Top goalscorer: League: Ally Brown (17); All: Ally Brown (21)
- Highest home attendance: 6,949 vs. Wolverhampton Wanderers, 24 September 1984
- Lowest home attendance: 1,386 vs. Northampton Town, 29 January 1985
- Average home league attendance: 3,267
- Biggest win: 5–1 vs. Exeter City, 1 January 1985
- Biggest defeat: 0–4 vs. Bury, 26 December 1984
Home colours	Away colours

The 1984–85 season was Port Vale's 73rd season of football in the English Football League, and first (12th overall) back in the Fourth Division following their relegation from the Third Division. John Rudge led his first full campaign as manager, overseeing a period of rebuilding that resulted in a mid-table 12th‑place finish

Veteran striker Ally Brown emerged as both league and season top‑scorer with 17 and 21 goals respectively, while young midfield dynamo Robbie Earle added 19 goals, signalling the club's attacking promise for the future. Defender Alan Webb, solid and consistent at the back, was voted the club's Player of the Year. In cup competitions, Vale reached the Third Round of the FA Cup, were eliminated in the Second Round of the Associate Members' Cup, and made it to the Second Round of the League Cup. Off the pitch, the club recorded its largest league win of 5–1 against Exeter City on New Year's Day, suffered a heaviest defeat of 4–0 at Bury on Boxing Day, and averaged an attendance of 3,267 at Vale Park.

A season under John Rudge, with key players Brown, Earle, and Webb, laid the groundwork for future progress despite a return to the lower tier.

== Overview ==
=== Fourth Division ===
The pre-season saw four new arrivals: veteran striker Ally Brown (Walsall); winger Peter Griffiths (Stoke City); and both forward Derek Monaghan and reliable defender Alan Webb (West Bromwich Albion). This came after John Rudge stated that "Vale's reputation has been built on grit and determination and I will be looking to bring in the player who is willing to die for the cause". Attempts to re-sign Brian Horton failed once again, whilst Martin Henderson had his contract cancelled after failing to report for pre-season training – he later signed with Spalding United. Just before the season began Gary Brazil was signed on loan from Sheffield United.

The season opened with a 1–0 defeat to Mansfield Town. Tommy Gore soon announced his retirement due to a neck injury. The Vale then went five games unbeaten, starting with a 1–1 draw at Wrexham on 1 September. The club announced a new five-year shirt sponsorship deal with Trentham firm Eagle Delivery Service. Young winger Ray Walker also arrived on loan from Aston Villa. On 22 September, Vale defeated Tranmere Rovers 2–1, due in part to a superb performance from Robbie Earle. However, the fans chanted 'what a load of rubbish' on 1 October, as Vale lost 3–0 at home to struggling side Northampton Town. Rudge stated that 'In truth we were rubbish' and promptly cancelled the player's day off. Another five-game unbeaten run followed, as Brown showed his 'class' and Walker impressed. On 20 October, Vale won 1–0 away at Swindon Town, who were coached by player-manager Lou Macari.

On 5 November, Eamonn O'Keefe scored a 'brilliant' hat-trick past Southend United in a 4–1 win. Rudge then signed Stockport County's outside-right Oshor Williams for £7,000. Vale's form then suffered after Walker returned to Villa Park. To remedy this Rudge signed Southend United midfielder Billy Kellock, who made 'a stunning impact' in his debut, playing a key part in the 5–1 victory over Exeter City on New Year's Day. This was the first of a 16-game unbeaten run, in which the team equalled a club-record six straight away draws between 19 January and 29 March.

On 2 February, Earle scored a hat-trick past Hereford United. Striker partner Ally Brown claimed "He is my brains and I am his legs". John Rudge received the Manager of the Month award for February. The next month Barry Siddall joined Stoke City on a free transfer, after Chris Pearce had established himself as the Vale's #1. Wayne Cegielski also signed with Blackpool and Eamonn O'Keefe followed him to Bloomfield Road for a £10,000 fee. On 16 March, Vale celebrated Rudge's Manager of the Month award for February with a 3–1 home win over Rochdale. Five victories in the opening six games of April took Vale sliding down the league, as Brown was out with a knee injury. Vale rallied to go through the final five games unbeaten. The season concluded with a 3–3 draw at Scunthorpe United after a two-goal lead was lost and only a late Williams strike salvaged a draw.

They finished in twelfth place with sixty points, winning and losing 14 games. Between them, Brown and Earle racked up a combined total of 40 goals in all competitions. Yet it was Russell Bromage who was selected for the PFA Fourth Division team.

=== Finances ===
On the financial side, a loss was made of £7,793 due to a 20% drop in attendance figures. The wage bill stood at £389,341, whilst gate receipts took in £128,954 and the lottery raised £191,000. The club's shirt sponsors were EDS. Five players left on free transfers, most significant were the departures of: Terry Armstrong and Derek Monaghan (retired); Colin Tartt (Shepshed Charterhouse); and Ian Griffiths (Wigan Athletic). Billy Kellock also refused terms, and so joined Halifax Town, whilst John Ridley joined Stafford Rangers as a player-coach. Vale received £700 following a tribunal claim, becoming the first Football League club to take a non-League club to a tribunal. The Sentinel's Vale reporter Chris Harper wrote that "Mr Rudge has shown himself to be a diligent, responsible type of manager and the Board could rest assured that he is not likely to pour money down the drain."

=== Cup competitions ===
In the FA Cup, Vale beat Northern Premier League leaders Macclesfield Town by two goals to one at Moss Rose. This game was overshadowed by a fence collapse that left 13 injured and led to 21 arrests. Town Chairman Alan Brocklehurst blamed 'the hooligan element of the Vale support'; however, Vale Chairman Jim Lloyd laid the blame at the feet of the police. The next round saw Vale come from a goal down to claim a 4–1 home victory over Scunthorpe United in a Friday night game, with Brown's equalising goal changing the pattern of the game just before half-time. In the third round they travelled to West Ham United's Upton Park, where the First Division club beat the "Valiants" 4–1.

In the League Cup, Vale went past Bury on away goals, having scored one of their two goals at Gigg Lane. In the second round they lost 2–1 at home to Second Division Wolverhampton Wanderers, though they did earn a goalless draw at Molineux.

In the Associate Members' Cup, Vale eliminated Northampton Town in a 2–1 replay victory at Sixfields. The original match saw an attendance of just 1,386 at Vale Park. At the replay, Ian Griffiths required a skin graft after getting his hand trapped in a toilet door. Vale were knocked out in the next round by Bristol City, losing 2–1 to the Third Division side at Ashton Gate.

== Results ==
=== Football League Fourth Division ===
==== League table ====
Pos	Team	Pld	W	D	L	GF	GA	GD	Pts
10	Crewe Alexandra	46	18	12	16	65	69	−4	66
11	Peterborough United	46	16	14	16	54	53	+1	62
12	Port Vale	46	14	18	14	61	59	+2	60
13	Aldershot	46	17	8	21	56	63	−7	59
14	Mansfield Town	46	13	18	15	41	38	+3	57

==== Results by matchday ====
Round	1	2	3	4	5	6	7	8	9	10	11	12	13	14	15	16	17	18	19	20	21	22	23	24	25	26	27	28	29	30	31	32	33	34	35	36	37	38	39	40	41	42	43	44	45	46
Ground	H	A	H	A	A	H	A	H	H	A	A	H	H	A	H	A	H	A	H	H	A	A	H	A	H	H	H	A	A	H	A	H	A	H	A	A	H	A	H	A	A	H	H	A	H	A
Result	L	D	D	W	D	W	L	L	W	W	W	D	W	L	W	L	D	L	L	D	L	L	W	D	D	W	W	D	D	W	D	W	D	D	D	L	D	L	L	L	L	D	W	D	W	D
Position	18	18	19	13	13	9	10	12	11	8	6	6	7	11	6	9	8	9	11	12	14	14	13	13	13	11	13	12	12	12	12	12	12	12	12	12	12	12	12	12	13	13	13	12	12	12
Points	0	1	2	5	6	9	9	9	12	15	18	19	22	22	25	25	26	26	26	27	27	27	30	31	32	35	38	39	40	43	44	47	48	49	50	50	51	51	51	51	51	52	55	56	59	60

Source: Statto
A = Away; H = Home; W = Win; D = Draw; L = Loss

==== Matches ====
25 August 1984 1	Port Vale	0–1	Mansfield Town	Burslem
		Report	Caldwell	Stadium: Vale Park; Attendance: 3,552

1 September 1984 2	Wrexham	1–1	Port Vale	Wrexham
15:00 BST	Rogers 38'	Report	Brazil 63'	Stadium: Racecourse Ground; Attendance: 1,849; Referee: K Walmsley; Assistant referees: N J Ellis, J E Tong

8 September 1984 3	Port Vale	1–1	Hartlepool United	Burslem
	Sproson 60'	Report	Linighan 13'	Stadium: Vale Park; Attendance: 3,232; Referee: Ray Guy

15 September 1984 4	Torquay United	1–3	Port Vale	Torquay
		Report	Walker; Earle; Brown	Stadium: Plainmoor; Attendance: 1,692

18 September 1984 5	Blackpool	1–1	Port Vale	Blackpool
		Report	Brazil	Stadium: Bloomfield Road; Attendance: 4,902

22 September 1984 6	Port Vale	2–1	Tranmere Rovers	Burslem
	Brazil; Earle	Report		Stadium: Vale Park; Attendance: 3,301

29 September 1984 7	Hereford United	1–0	Port Vale	Hereford
	Kearns 39'	Report		Stadium: Edgar Street; Attendance: 4,093

1 October 1984 8	Port Vale	0–3	Northampton Town	Burslem
		Report		Stadium: Vale Park; Attendance: 3,235

6 October 1984 9	Port Vale	2–0	Crewe Alexandra	Burslem
	Brown; P.Griffiths	Report		Stadium: Vale Park; Attendance: 4,145

13 October 1984 10	Rochdale	1–2	Port Vale	Rochdale
	Cooke 37'	Report	O'Keefe 22'; Brown 33'	Stadium: Spotland Stadium; Attendance: 1,722; Referee: A Saunders

20 October 1984 11	Swindon Town	0–1	Port Vale	Swindon
		Report	O'Keefe 58'	Stadium: County Ground; Attendance: 3,056; Referee: A. Buksh

22 October 1984 12	Port Vale	0–0	Chesterfield	Burslem
		Report		Stadium: Vale Park; Attendance: 4,988

27 October 1984 13	Port Vale	3–1	Peterborough United	Burslem
	Brown; O'Keefe	Report	Cassidy	Stadium: Vale Park; Attendance: 3,943; Referee: T. Simpson

3 November 1984 14	Stockport County	3–1	Port Vale	Stockport
15:00 GMT	Hendrie 11'; Coyle 24'; Taylor 51'	Report	O'Keefe 60'	Stadium: Edgeley Park; Attendance: 2,698; Referee: David Richardson

5 November 1984 15	Port Vale	4–1	Southend United	Burslem
	O'Keefe; Earle	Report		Stadium: Vale Park; Attendance: 2,989

10 November 1984 16	Aldershot	1–0	Port Vale	Aldershot
		Report		Stadium: Recreation Ground; Attendance: 2,188

23 November 1984 17	Port Vale	0–0	Chester City	Burslem
		Report		Stadium: Vale Park; Attendance: 3,391

30 November 1984 18	Halifax Town	2–1	Port Vale	Halifax, West Yorkshire
		Report	Hunter	Stadium: The Shay; Attendance: 1,689

15 December 1984 19	Port Vale	0–1	Darlington	Burslem
		Report		Stadium: Vale Park; Attendance: 3,645

22 December 1984 20	Port Vale	1–1	Scunthorpe United	Burslem
	P.Griffiths	Report		Stadium: Vale Park; Attendance: 2,521

26 December 1984 21	Bury	4–0	Port Vale	Bury, Greater Manchester
		Report		Stadium: Gigg Lane; Attendance: 4,664

28 December 1984 22	Colchester United	3–2	Port Vale	Colchester
19:30 GMT	Groves 4'; Bowen 32' (pen.), 56' (pen.)	Report	Brown 50'; Smith 66'	Stadium: Layer Road; Attendance: 2,014; Referee: E Scales

1 January 1985 23	Port Vale	5–1	Exeter City	Burslem
15:00 BST	Kellock (pen.); Brown; Earle	Report	Belfon; Cavener; Hayes	Stadium: Vale Park; Attendance: 3,306; Referee: Allan Banks

19 January 1985 24	Hartlepool United	2–2	Port Vale	Hartlepool
	Dixon 2', 65'	Report	Brown 50'; Williams 87'	Stadium: Victoria Park; Attendance: 2,285; Referee: David Scott

26 January 1985 25	Port Vale	2–2	Torquay United	Burslem
	Hunter; Earle	Report		Stadium: Vale Park; Attendance: 2,839

2 February 1985 26	Port Vale	3–1	Hereford United	Burslem
	Earle 9', 18', 31'	Report	Phillips 32'	Stadium: Vale Park; Attendance: 3,453

23 February 1985 27	Port Vale	3–2	Stockport County	Burslem
15:00 GMT	Bromage 6'; Brown 10', 61'	Report	Power 46'; Crawford 83'	Stadium: Vale Park; Attendance: 3,154; Referee: John Ball

2 March 1985 28	Peterborough United	0–0	Port Vale	Peterborough
		Report		Stadium: London Road Stadium; Attendance: 2,817; Referee: K. Miller

5 March 1985 29	Chesterfield	0–0	Port Vale	Chesterfield, Derbyshire
		Report		Stadium: Saltergate; Attendance: 3,480

9 March 1985 30	Port Vale	2–0	Swindon Town	Burslem
	Sproson 53'; Brown	Report		Stadium: Vale Park; Attendance: 3,300; Referee: K.S. Hackett

13 March 1985 31	Port Vale	1–1	Mansfield Town	Burslem
	Sproson	Report	Whatmore	Stadium: Vale Park; Attendance: 2,161

16 March 1985 32	Port Vale	3–1	Rochdale	Burslem
	Griffiths 46'; Kellock 70' (pen.); Brown 89'	Report	Gamble 80'	Stadium: Vale Park; Attendance: 2,788; Referee: HW King

22 March 1985 33	Crewe Alexandra	0–0	Port Vale	Crewe
		Report		Stadium: Gresty Road; Attendance: 4,763

25 March 1985 34	Port Vale	0–0	Wrexham	Burslem
19:30 GMT		Report		Stadium: Vale Park; Attendance: 2,964; Referee: L R Dilkes; Assistant referees: P S Danson, D B Scrimshaw

29 March 1985 35	Southend United	1–1	Port Vale	Southend-on-Sea
		Report	Earle	Stadium: Roots Hall; Attendance: 2,407

1 April 1985 36	Tranmere Rovers	4–1	Port Vale	Prenton
		Report	Earle	Stadium: Prenton Park; Attendance: 1,450

6 April 1985 37	Port Vale	0–0	Bury	Burslem
		Report		Stadium: Vale Park; Attendance: 3,544

8 April 1985 38	Exeter City	2–1	Port Vale	Exeter
		Report	Earle	Stadium: St James Park; Attendance: 2,427

13 April 1985 39	Port Vale	1–2	Aldershot	Burslem
	Earle	Report		Stadium: Vale Park; Attendance: 2,562

17 April 1985 40	Northampton Town	1–0	Port Vale	Northampton
19:30 BST	Gage	Report		Stadium: County Cricket Ground; Attendance: 1,311

20 April 1985 41	Chester City	2–0	Port Vale	Chester
	Walker	Report		Stadium: Sealand Road; Attendance: 1,575

22 April 1985 42	Port Vale	1–1	Blackpool	Burslem
	Brown	Report		Stadium: Vale Park; Attendance: 3,725

27 April 1985 43	Port Vale	3–1	Halifax Town	Burslem
	Brown; Earle; Williams	Report		Stadium: Vale Park; Attendance: 2,029

4 May 1985 44	Darlington	1–1	Port Vale	Darlington
		Report	Earle	Stadium: Feethams; Attendance: 3,565

6 May 1985 45	Port Vale	3–2	Colchester United	Burslem
	Brown 40'; Kellock 65'; Earle 71' (pen.)	Report	Shinners 85'; Groves 89'	Stadium: Vale Park; Attendance: 2,526; Referee: G Aplin

10 May 1985 46	Scunthorpe United	3–3	Port Vale	Scunthorpe
		Report	Brown; Tartt; Williams	Stadium: Old Show Ground; Attendance: 1,867

=== FA Cup ===
19 November 1984 R1	Macclesfield Town	1–2	Port Vale	Macclesfield
	White	Report	Brown; Earle	Stadium: Moss Rose; Attendance: 4,672

7 December 1984 R2	Port Vale	4–1	Scunthorpe United	Burslem
	Brown; O'Keefe (pen.); Bromage; I.Griffiths	Report		Stadium: Vale Park; Attendance: 4,268

5 January 1985 R3	West Ham United	4–1	Port Vale	Upton Park, London
	Goddard; Dickens	Report	P.Griffiths	Stadium: Boleyn Ground; Attendance: 11,452

=== League Cup ===
28 August 1984 R1 1st Leg	Port Vale	1–0	Bury	Burslem
	Earle	Report		Stadium: Vale Park; Attendance: 2,498

4 September 1984 R1 2nd Leg	Bury	2–1 (a.e.t.) (2a–2 agg.)	Port Vale	Bury, Greater Manchester
		Report	Tartt	Stadium: Gigg Lane; Attendance: 2,257

24 September 1984 R2 1st Leg	Port Vale	1–2	Wolverhampton Wanderers	Burslem
	Brown 30'	Report	Evans 49'; Dodd 83'	Stadium: Vale Park; Attendance: 6,949; Referee: J Worrall

9 October 1984 R2 2nd Leg	Wolverhampton Wanderers	0–0 (2–1 agg.)	Port Vale	Wolverhampton
		Report		Stadium: Molineux Stadium; Attendance: 5,964; Referee: H King

=== Associate Members' Cup ===
29 January 1985 R1	Port Vale	1–1	Northampton Town	Burslem
19:30 GMT	Williams	Report	Benjamin	Stadium: Vale Park; Attendance: 1,386

5 February 1985 Replay	Northampton Town	1–2	Port Vale	Northampton
19:30 GMT	Belfon	Report	Earle	Stadium: County Cricket Ground; Attendance: 1,405

18 March 1985 R2	Bristol City	2–1	Port Vale	Ashton Gate, Bristol
		Report	Brown	Stadium: Ashton Gate; Attendance: 3,635

== Squad statistics ==
=== Appearances and goals ===
Key to positions: GK – Goalkeeper; DF – Defender; MF – Midfielder; FW – Forward

No.	Pos	Nat	Player	Total		Fourth Division		FA Cup		League Cup		Associate Members' Cup	
No.	Pos	Nat	Player	Apps	Goals	Apps	Goals	Apps	Goals	Apps	Goals	Apps	Goals
	GK	(England) ENG	Karl Austin	1	0	1	0	0	0	0	0	0	0
	GK	(Wales) WAL	Chris Pearce	43	0	36	0	2	0	3	0	2	0
	DF	(England) ENG	Chris Banks	10	0	7	0	0	0	0	0	3	0
	DF	(England) ENG	Russell Bromage	46	2	37	1	3	1	4	0	2	0
	DF	(England) ENG	Wayne Ebanks	11	0	11	0	0	0	0	0	0	0
	DF	(England) ENG	Phil Sproson	54	3	44	3	3	0	4	0	3	0
	DF	(England) ENG	Alan Webb	56	0	46	0	3	0	4	0	3	0
	MF	(England) ENG	Terry Armstrong	6	0	4	0	0	0	2	0	0	0
	MF	(Jamaica) JAM	Robbie Earle	56	19	46	15	3	1	4	1	3	2
	MF	(England) ENG	Ian Griffiths	15	1	12	0	1	1	0	0	2	0
	MF	(England) ENG	Peter Griffiths	39	4	31	3	2	1	4	0	2	0
	MF	(England) ENG	Geoff Hunter	51	2	42	2	3	0	3	0	3	0
	MF	(Scotland) SCO	Billy Kellock	13	4	11	4	0	0	0	0	2	0
	MF	(England) ENG	Wayne Kerrins	8	0	8	0	0	0	0	0	0	0
	MF	(England) ENG	John Ridley	51	0	43	0	2	0	4	0	2	0
	MF	(England) ENG	Adrian Reeves-Jones	3	0	3	0	0	0	0	0	0	0
	MF	(England) ENG	Martyn Smith	17	1	13	1	0	0	3	0	1	0
	MF	(England) ENG	Colin Tartt	15	2	12	1	0	0	3	1	0	0
	MF	(England) ENG	Ray Walker	15	1	15	1	0	0	0	0	0	0
	FW	(Scotland) SCO	Ally Brown	49	21	40	17	3	2	4	1	2	1
	FW	(England) ENG	Derek Monaghan	9	0	7	0	0	0	1	0	1	0
	FW	(England) ENG	Oshor Williams	22	4	17	3	3	0	0	0	2	1
Players who featured but departed the club during the season:
	GK	(England) ENG	Barry Siddall	12	0	9	0	1	0	1	0	1	0
	DF	(Wales) WAL	Wayne Cegielski	10	0	8	0	1	0	1	0	0	0
	MF	(England) ENG	Tommy Gore	1	0	0	0	0	0	1	0	0	0
	MF	(England) ENG	Paul Lodge	3	0	3	0	0	0	0	0	0	0
	FW	(England) ENG	Gary Brazil	6	3	6	3	0	0	0	0	0	0
	FW	(Republic of Ireland) IRL	Eamonn O'Keefe	27	8	22	7	3	1	1	0	1	0

=== Top scorers ===
Place	Position	Nation	Name	Fourth Division	FA Cup	League Cup	Associate Members' Cup	Total
1	FW	Scotland	Ally Brown	17	2	1	1	21
2	MF	Jamaica	Robbie Earle	15	1	1	2	19
3	FW	Ireland	Eamonn O'Keefe	7	1	0	0	8
4	MF	Scotland	Billy Kellock	4	0	0	0	4
–	FW	England	Oshor Williams	3	0	1	0	4
–	MF	England	Peter Griffiths	3	1	0	0	4
7	FW	England	Gary Brazil	3	0	0	0	3
–	DF	England	Phil Sproson	3	0	0	0	3
9	MF	England	Geoff Hunter	2	0	0	0	2
–	MF	England	Colin Tartt	1	0	1	0	2
–	DF	England	Russell Bromage	1	1	0	0	2
12	MF	England	Ray Walker	1	0	0	0	1
–	MF	England	Martyn Smith	1	0	0	0	1
–	FW	England	Ian Griffiths	0	1	0	0	1
			TOTALS	61	7	3	4	75

== Transfers ==
=== Transfers in ===
Date from	Position	Nationality	Name	From	Fee	Ref.
1984	MF	ENG	Oshor Williams	Stockport County	Free transfer	
July 1984	FW	SCO	Alistair Brown	Walsall	Free transfer	
July 1984	MF	ENG	Peter Griffiths	Stoke City	Free transfer	
July 1984	FW	ENG	Derek Monaghan	West Bromwich Albion	Free transfer	
July 1984	DF	ENG	Alan Webb	West Bromwich Albion	Free transfer	
August 1984	MF	ENG	Martyn Smith	Leek Town	Free transfer	
October 1984	MF	ENG	Ian Griffiths	Rochdale	Free transfer	
December 1984	MF	SCO	Billy Kellock	Southend United	Free transfer	
February 1985	GK	ENG	Karl Austin	Stafford Rangers	Non-contract	

=== Transfers out ===
Date from	Position	Nationality	Name	To	Fee	Ref.
October 1984	MF	ENG	Tommy Gore	Retired		
March 1985	DF	WAL	Wayne Cegielski	Blackpool	Free transfer	
March 1985	MF	IRL	Eamonn O'Keefe	Blackpool	£17,500	
March 1985	GK	ENG	Barry Siddall	Stoke City	Free transfer	
May 1985	MF	ENG	Terry Armstrong	Nuneaton Borough	Free transfer	
May 1985	FW	ENG	Derek Monaghan	Redditch United	Free transfer	
May 1985	MF	ENG	Adrian Reeves-Jones	Leek Town	Free transfer	
May 1985	MF	ENG	Martyn Smith	Macclesfield Town	Free transfer	
May 1985	MF	ENG	Colin Tartt	Shepshed Charterhouse	Free transfer	
June 1985	MF	SCO	Billy Kellock	Halifax Town	Free transfer	
Summer 1985	GK	ENG	Karl Austin	Gresley Rovers	Free transfer	
Summer 1985	MF	ENG	Ian Griffiths	Wigan Athletic	Free transfer	
Summer 1985	MF	ENG	John Ridley	Stafford Rangers	£700	

=== Loans in ===
Date from	Position	Nationality	Name	From	Date to	Ref.
August 1984	FW	ENG	Gary Brazil	Aston Villa	August 1984	
August 1984	MF	ENG	Ray Walker	Aston Villa	End of season	
November 1984	MF	ENG	Paul Lodge	Bolton Wanderers	January 1985	
March 1985	DF	ENG	Wayne Ebanks	West Bromwich Albion	End of season	
March 1985	MF	ENG	Wayne Kerrins	Fulham	End of season	

=== Loans out ===
Date from	Position	Nationality	Name	To	Date to	Ref.
January 1985	GK	ENG	Barry Siddall	Stoke City	March 1985	
