= Adrian Reeves-Jones =

British footballer

Personal information
- Full name: Adrian Kenneth Reeves-Jones
- Date of birth: 18 October 1966 (age 60)
- Place of birth: Stoke-on-Trent, England
- Position: Midfielder

Youth career
- Port Vale

Senior career*
Years	Team	Apps	(Gls)
1984–1985	Port Vale	3	(0)
1986	Leek Town	13	(1)
- Eastwood
- * Club domestic league appearances and goals

Adrian Kenneth Reeves-Jones (born 18 October 1966) is an English former footballer who played for Port Vale, Leek Town, and Eastwood Town.

== Career ==
Reeves-Jones graduated through Port Vale's youth team to sign as a professional in November 1984. He made his first appearance at Vale Park as a substitute in a goalless draw with Wrexham on 25 March 1985 and made his full debut on 17 April, in a 1–0 defeat by Northampton Town at the County Ground. Three days after making his full debut he played in a 2–0 defeat to Chester City at Sealand Road. However, these were his only Fourth Division games for the "Valiants" in the 1984–85 season, and manager John Rudge gave him a free transfer to North West Counties League side Leek Town in May 1985. He played 18 games in the 1986–87 season, scoring one goal against Glossop North End on 12 August. He later played for Eastwood Town.

== Career statistics ==
Appearances and goals by club, season and competition
Club	Season	League			FA Cup		Other		Total	
Club	Season	Division	Apps	Goals	Apps	Goals	Apps	Goals	Apps	Goals
Port Vale	1984–85	Fourth Division	3	0	0	0	0	0	3	0
Leek Town	1986–87	North West Counties League; Division One	13	1	1	0	4	0	18	1
