= Peter Griffiths (footballer, born 1957) =

English footballer

Personal information
- Full name: Peter James Griffiths
- Date of birth: 14 August 1957 (age 69)
- Place of birth: Barnstaple, England
- Position: Right winger

Youth career
- Pilton Centre

Senior career*
Years	Team	Apps	(Gls)
1978–1980	Bideford		
1980–1984	Stoke City	60	(5)
1984	→ Bradford City (loan)	2	(0)
1984–1986	Port Vale	36	(4)
- Salisbury United
- Newcastle KB United
- Stafford Rangers
- Northwich Victoria
- Matlock Town
- Milton United
Total		98+	(9+)
- * Club domestic league appearances and goals

Peter James Griffiths (born 14 August 1957) is an English former footballer who made 98 league appearances on the right-wing in the English Football League for Stoke City, Bradford City, and Port Vale in the 1980s. He also played non-League football for Bideford, Salisbury United (Australia), Newcastle KB United (Australia), Stafford Rangers, Northwich Victoria, Matlock Town and Milton United. He played for Stoke in the First Division. He helped Port Vale to win promotion out of the Fourth Division in 1985–86.

== Career ==
=== Stoke City ===
Griffiths moved from Bideford (Western League) to Alan Durban's Stoke City for a £15,000 fee after a successful trial in November 1980, giving up his job as a self-employed panel beater in the process. He scored his first goal at the Victoria Ground on 27 December 1980, in a 2–2 draw with Coventry City; this was his only goal in five starts and five substitute appearances in the 1980–81 season. Everton made a £150,000 offer for Griffiths, which was rejected by the Stoke board. He scored three goals in 33 games in the 1981–82 season, finding the net against Aston Villa, Middlesbrough and Swansea City early on in the campaign. He soon fell out of the first-team picture under Richie Barker and made just 11 First Division starts in the 1982–83 campaign, finding the net once in a 4–1 win over Birmingham City at St Andrew's on 4 September. He featured just five times for the "Potters" in the 1983–84 season and was loaned out to Bradford City. He played two Third Division games for Trevor Cherry's "Bantams", in a brief stay at Valley Parade.

=== Port Vale ===
Griffiths was signed by Stoke's rivals Port Vale in July 1984. He played regular football in the 1984–85 season, scoring four goals in 39 games, until tearing a groin muscle in April 1985. Upon his recovery, he failed to gain his first-team spot back at Vale Park. He featured just nine times in the 1985–86 Fourth Division promotion winning campaign. "Valiants" manager John Rudge handed him a free transfer in May 1986.

=== Later career ===
He emigrated to Australia to play for Salisbury United, and then National Soccer League side Newcastle KB United, before returning to Staffordshire to play for Conference club Stafford Rangers. After leaving Rangers he played for Northwich Victoria, Matlock Town (Northern Premier League) and Milton United.

== Career statistics ==
Appearances and goals by club, season and competition
Club	Season	League			FA Cup		League Cup		Other^{[A]}		Total	
Club	Season	Division	Apps	Goals	Apps	Goals	Apps	Goals	Apps	Goals	Apps	Goals
Stoke City	1980–81	First Division	10	1	0	0	0	0	0	0	10	1
Stoke City	1981–82	First Division	31	3	1	0	1	0	0	0	33	3
Stoke City	1982–83	First Division	15	1	0	0	1	0	0	0	16	1
Stoke City	1983–84	First Division	4	0	0	0	1	0	0	0	5	0
Stoke City	Total		60	5	1	0	3	0	0	0	64	5
Bradford City (loan)	1983–84	Third Division	2	0	0	0	0	0	1	0	3	0
Port Vale	1984–85	Fourth Division	31	3	2	1	4	0	2	0	39	4
Port Vale	1985–86	Fourth Division	5	1	0	0	1	0	3	0	9	1
Port Vale	Total		36	4	2	1	5	0	5	0	48	5
Career total			98	9	3	1	8	0	6	0	115	10

A. The "Other" column constitutes appearances and goals in the Football League Trophy.

== Honours ==
Port Vale

- Football League Fourth Division fourth-place promotion: 1985–86
