= 1988–89 Blackpool F.C. season =

English football club season

Blackpool F.C.
1988–89 season
- Owner and chairman: Owen Oyston (from 31 May)
- Manager: Sam Ellis (succeeded by Jimmy Mullen)
- Division Three: 19th
- FA Cup: Third round
- League Cup: Third round
- Top goalscorer: League: Andy Garner (11); All: Andy Garner (15)

The 1988–89 season was Blackpool F.C.'s 81st season (78th consecutive) in the Football League. They competed in the 24-team Division Three, then the third tier of English league football, finishing nineteenth.

Andy Garner was the club's top scorer, with fifteen goals (eleven in the league, two in the FA Cup and two in the League Cup).

== Table ==
Pos	Team	Pld	W	D	L	GF	GA	GD	Pts	Promotion or relegation
17	Wigan Athletic	46	14	14	18	55	53	+2	56	
18	Reading	46	15	11	20	68	72	−4	56	
19	Blackpool	46	14	13	19	56	59	−3	55	
20	Northampton Town	46	16	6	24	66	76	−10	54	
21	Southend United (R)	46	13	15	18	56	75	−19	54	Relegation to the Fourth Division

(R) Relegated
