= 1986–87 Blackpool F.C. season =

English football club season

Blackpool F.C.
1986–87 season
- Manager: Sam Ellis
- Division Three: 9th
- FA Cup: First round
- League Cup: First round
- Top goalscorer: League: Paul Stewart (21); All: Paul Stewart (21)
Home colours

The 1986–87 season was Blackpool F.C.'s 79th season (76th consecutive) in the Football League. They competed in the 24-team Division Three, then the third tier of English league football, finishing ninth.

Paul Stewart was the club's top scorer, with 21 goals.

During the close season, on 26 July, the club celebrated their centenary.

== Table ==
Pos	Team	Pld	W	D	L	GF	GA	GD	Pts
7	Notts County	46	21	13	12	77	56	+21	76
8	Walsall	46	22	9	15	80	67	+13	75
9	Blackpool	46	16	16	14	74	59	+15	64
10	Mansfield Town	46	15	16	15	52	55	−3	61
11	Brentford	46	15	15	16	64	66	−2	60
