= Sam Ellis (footballer) =

English footballer and manager (born 1946)

Personal information
- Full name: Samuel Ellis
- Date of birth: 12 September 1946 (age 80)
- Place of birth: Ashton-under-Lyne, Lancashire, England
- Height: 6 ft 0 in (1.83 m)
- Position: Centre-half

Senior career*
| Years | Team | Apps | (Gls) |
| 1964–1972 | Sheffield Wednesday | 155 | (1) |
| 1972–1973 | Mansfield Town | 64 | (7) |
| 1973–1977 | Lincoln City | 173 | (33) |
| 1977–1979 | Watford | 30 | (4) |
| Total | | 422 | (45) |

International career
| 1968–1969 | England U-23 | 3 | (0) |

Managerial career
- 1982–1989: Blackpool
- 1989–1990: Bury
- 1994–1995: Lincoln City
- * Club domestic league appearances and goals

Samuel Ellis (born 12 September 1946) is an English football coach and former player. He was most recently the assistant manager of Middlesbrough. His only honour was guiding Blackpool to promotion from Division Four to Division Three in 1984–85.

== Career ==
Ellis was born in Ashton-under-Lyne, Lancashire. In his younger days, he played as a centre-half for Sheffield Wednesday in the 1960s. As a teenager he made his debut in the 1966 FA Cup final against Everton, which his team lost 3–2. He then moved on to play for Mansfield Town, Lincoln City, and Watford. It was at Vicarage Road that he became coach and assistant manager to future England boss Graham Taylor. With Ellis' help, Watford climbed the divisions before turning down a new contract in favour of trying his hand at management. When the Blackpool job was advertised, Ellis applied and was given the job on 1 June 1982.

Ellis was manager at the seaside for seven years, from 1982 to 1989, with no prior managerial experience, but the new board at Bloomfield Road were confident in his ability. Despite finishing in the bottom four of the Fourth Division in his first season, thus forcing the club to apply for re-election to the Football League, Ellis managed to turn the side around and gain promotion two years later with only limited funds handed to him. Although he kept the Tangerines in the Third Division, they were unable to make further progress and Ellis' contract was terminated on 28 March 1989, with relegation looking a possibility. At the time of his departure, Ellis was the third longest serving Blackpool manager in terms of Football League games in charge.

Ellis then had a brief spell as manager of Bury before moving to Manchester City as Peter Reid's assistant manager. In 1994, he was appointed manager of Lincoln City before returning to Gigg Lane as Stan Ternent's assistant the following year. When Ternent moved to Burnley in 1998, Ellis followed him. After six years at Turf Moor, Ellis became assistant manager to Kevin Blackwell at Leeds United for two years. Ellis later worked with Blackwell at Luton Town (after a spell at Stoke City) and Sheffield United.

On 13 July 2018, he returned to football as the new assistant manager of Middlesbrough replacing David Kemp who had left at the end of the previous season. After the departure of Tony Pulis, his contract was also not renewed by the club in May 2019.

== Personal life ==
On 31 October 2001, Ellis' 28-year-old son, Timothy, was killed in a car accident. Ellis' other son, Steven, is a professional rugby player.

== Honours ==
=== As a player ===
Sheffield Wednesday

- FA Cup runner-up: 1965–66

Lincoln City

- Division 4 winner: 1975–76

=== As a manager ===
Blackpool

- Football League Fourth Division promotion: 1984–85
