= Fernando del Valle =

American opera singer (born 1964)

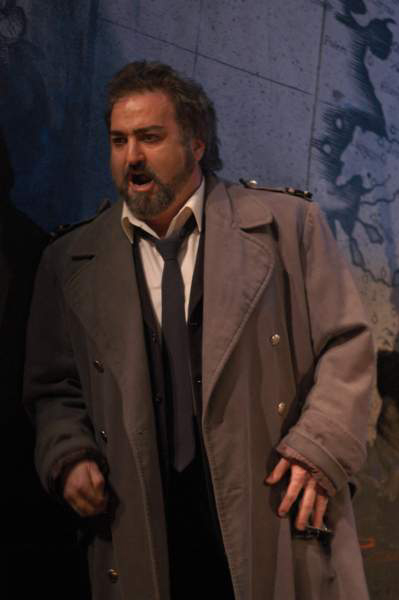
- del Valle in 2010

Background information
- Born: Brian Stephen Skinner; February 28, 1964; New Orleans, Louisiana, United States
- Genres: Opera
- Occupation: Opera singer
- Instrument: Tenor

Fernando del Valle (né Brian Stephen Skinner; February 28, 1964) is an American operatic tenor. He is the son of Edward King Skinner II, a Korean War veteran and Concha Marina Meléndez del Valle the cousin of George Melendez Wright. He is the grandson of Aranka Bischitz great-great-granddaughter of Baroness Johanna Bischitz von Heves and niece of Hungarian radiochemist and Nobel Prize in Chemistry laureate George de Hevesy. He is the nephew of the Architect Manuel Roberto Meléndez Bischitz.

== Ancestry ==
He took the name del Valle in honour of his grandfather, Fernando Meléndez del Valle, who was also a tenor and diplomat for El Salvador at the consulate of El Salvador in New Orleans.

He is the great-great-grandson of Andrés del Valle President of El Salvador in 1876 and a direct descendant of Colonel José María San Martín, President of El Salvador (1854–56) and founder of Santa Tecla, El Salvador.

A fourth generation New Orleanian, he is the grandson of the Honorable Judge Robert J. Skinner, former recorder and treasurer (for the City of New Orleans), a regimental sergeant-major in World War I, and the great-grandson of Judge Edward King Skinner, who served on the city, criminal and civil district court benches, successively, over a total period of 52 years

In 1880, he was appointed to first district court after the American Civil War. A year after his retirement attorneys gave civil district court a portrait in oils of Judge Skinner.

The portrait by John Paul Parker, was presented to the court by United States Attorney Rene A. Viosca, who was then president of the New Orleans Bar Association.

== Biography ==
He was born in New Orleans. A graduate of Brother Martin High School, he received his Bachelor of Fine Arts from Tulane University as the recipient of the Treville Scholarship in Voice, and the Artists Diploma from Southern Methodist University as the Haggar Scholar where he studied under Thomas Hayward. As a winner of the Dallas Opera Guild Vocal Competition he was awarded a Career Grant from The Dallas Opera, the winner of the Stewart Award, the Austin Lyric Opera Vocal Competition, the Fort Worth Opera Competition and the Vocal Competition of the San Antonio Opera judged by Evelyn Lear and Richard Gaddes.

In 1986 he won the "Bel Canto" competition of Chicago, under the direction of the legendary tenor Carlo Bergonzi. He remained in Busseto, Italy and subsequently relocated to Europe where he studied for years with Regina Resnik and later Nicolai Gedda.

He is an alumnus of the San Francisco Opera's Merola Opera Program and in 1992 and 1993.

=== Early years ===
Del Valle made his operatic debut at the age of seventeen (1981), as the First Shepherd in John Blow's Venus and Adonis (Blow), at Loyola University followed by roles in La rondine, conducted by Maurice Peress, Brigadoon, Shenandoah and The Merry Widow.

The next year, after advice of his Tulane professor, Deborah Drattell, he became tenor soloist in Bach's "St Matthew Passion" with the New Orleans Philharmonic-Symphony Orchestra, Andrew Massey, conducting. In 1986, he made his Boston debut in that composer's Christmas Oratorio in Jordan Hall as the winner of the Boston Premiere Ensembles Young Artist Competition. The following spring, his New York debut took place at Alice Tully Hall, Lincoln Center, with the Beethoven Society of New York, Lorna Cooke deVaron conducting the Boston Symphony Orchestra.

He continued his career as a concert tenor with a repertoire that included Beethoven's Missa Solemnis, and the Requiems of Verdi, Britten and Lloyd Webber. The tenor's Carnegie Hall debut occurred in 1993, with Mozart's "Great" Mass in C minor with the American Symphony Orchestra. He performed the tenor solos in George Frideric Handel's Messiah for the Dallas Symphony Orchestra, at the Morton H. Meyerson Symphony Center in 1994. He made his European debut in 1995, singing in Beethoven's Symphony No. 9 with the Orchestra Sinfonica di Milano Giuseppe Verdi, Alun Francis, conducting.

Del Valle's European operatic debut took place with the role of "Don José" in the Hugo de Ana production of Carmen at the Teatro Comunale di Treviso under the vocal direction of Regina Resnik and conducted by Peter Maag. In 1996, he appeared as Rodolfo in La bohème, at the Teatro dell'Opera di Roma, Vladimir Jurowski, conducting.

=== 1997–present ===
In 1997, del Valle appeared as 'don José' at the Gran Teatro La Fenice in Venice, Isaac Karabtchevsky, conducting 'Pinkerton' in Madama Butterfly with the Palm Beach Opera, Anton Guadagno, conducting and 'Faust' in Colmar, France. He made his German debut in 1998 as 'Rodolfo' with the Frankfurt Opera, under the direction of the venerated pedagogue/conductor, Klauspeter Seibel, immediately following he appeared to critical acclaim, at the Wexford Festival in Ireland as 'Paolo' in Fosca (opera) by Antônio Carlos Gomes. A series of important engagements followed, and since 1999, del Valle has appeared around the world, including performances in Frankfurt Alte Oper, Strasbourg (Beethoven 9th Symphony, op. 125, with John Storgards conducting), Maastricht, Deutsche Oper am Rhein, Theater Augsburg, La Scala, Opera Australia, Tonhalle Düsseldorf, Deutsche Oper Berlin, Theater Dortmund, Teatro Carlo Felice, Bremen, Bergen, Costa Rica, Munich Gasteig, Finnish National Opera, Helsinki, Belo Horizonte in Brazil, the HIFA Festival in Harare, Zimbabwe, Malmö, Sweden, New Symphony Orchestra of Sofia, Bulgaria, Teatro Petruzzelli di Bari, Turin, Baveno, Inaugural concert of the Umberto Giordano Festival with the RAI National Symphony Orchestra, Paolo Vaglieri conducting, National Theatre Mannheim, Badisches Staatstheater Karlsruhe, Staatstheater Kassel, Hamburg and Hessisches Staatstheater Wiesbaden.

For three years, del Valle was engaged as the Principal Tenor at the Staatstheater Darmstadt, at the invitation of Marc Albrecht. His career followed by performances in Israel, Korea, Catania, Sydney (recording Elgar's The Dream of Gerontius at the Sydney Opera House), Lisbon and Prague.

He has collaborated with some of the most notable conductors in the world including, Vladimir Jurowski, Ralf Otto, Asher Fisch, Anton Guadagno, Claudio Abbado, Eduardo Mata, Benjamin Zander, Isaac Karabtchevsky, Peter Maag, John DeMain, Helge Dotsch, Daniel Pinkham, Carl St. Clair, JoAnn Falletta, John Nelson, Dan Ettinger, Carlo Maria Giulini, Daniel Cohen, Alexander Lazarev, Alexander Anissimov, Patrick Summers, Philippe Entremont, Joseph Rescigno, and Richard Bonynge.

In 2003 his portrait was realised by Ricarda Jaccobi protégé of Oskar Kokoschka.

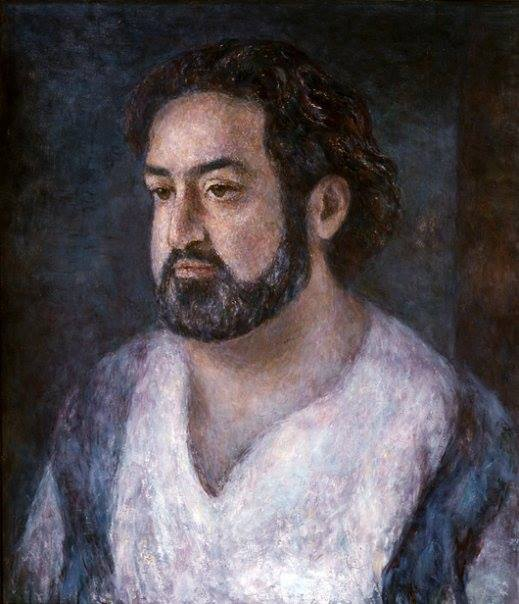
Fernando del Valle by Ricarda Jacobi

On the occasion of the 150th (1854–2004) Anniversary of Santa Tecla, El Salvador, del Valle was invited by former Salvadoran Ambassador Ernesto Rivas-Gallont to present 2 Concerts. A devotee of Saint Thérèse of Lisieux, the Tenor requested that the first performance take place on September 23, the feast-day of Saint Thecla, the Saint for whom the city is named.

Since 2011, due to health issues, he does not perform in large scale staged productions, concentrating on benefit and charity events instead.

=== Health ===
In 1995, he was diagnosed with Type 1 diabetes when he was 31 years old, and treated at Parkland Memorial Hospital. Legally blind, he suffers from diabetic retinopathy, glaucoma, macular degeneration, ocular ischemic syndrome, cataracts, macular edema, diabetic cardiomyopathy and diabetic neuropathy.

== Sample reviews ==
Salvator Rosa by Carlos Gomes (Dorset Opera, London)

"Fernando del Valle produced some of the most beautiful tenor sounds to be heard today, carried effortlessly throughout the range." Andrew Porterr OPERA 2000"In the title role, Fernando del Valle produced firm, true tone and shapely, phrasing, matched by vocal strength and dramatic power."

Verdi's Attila (The Israeli Opera, Tel Aviv)

"Fernando del Valle's tenor - soft and lyric in the love scenes, resolute in his heroic moments, and childishly excited in his jealousy - made for a perfectly credible Foresto."

Fosca by Carlos Gomes (The Wexford Festival)

"...an exciting Tenor, especially at the top of the register, who can shape a phrase with real sensitivity."

Rodney Milnes The Times October 28, 1998

== Roles sung on stage ==
Bizet

- Carmen - Don José
- Les pêcheurs de perles - Nadir

Boito

- Mefistofele - Faust

Donizetti

- L'elisir d'amore - Nemorino
- Lucia di Lammermoor - Edgardo
- Lucrezia Borgia - Rustighello

Giordano

- Andrea Chénier - Title role

Gomes

- Fosca - Paolo
- Salvator Rosa - Title role

Gounod

- Faust - Title role

André Ernest Modeste Grétry

- Zémire et Azor - Azor

Lehar

- Die lustige Witwe - Camille de Rosillon

Leoncavallo

- Pagliacci - Canio

Mascagni

- Cavalleria rusticana - Turiddu

Massenet

- Manon - des Grieux
- Werther - Title role

Mozart

- Die Zauberflöte - Tamino

Ponchielli

- La Gioconda - Enzo

Jacques Offenbach

- Les contes d'Hoffmann - Title role

Puccini

- La fanciulla del West - Dick Johnson
- Tosca - Cavaradossi
- La rondine - Prunier
- La bohème - Rodolfo
- Madama Butterfly - B.F. Pinkerton
- Manon Lescaut - des Grieux
- Le Villi - Roberto

Johann Strauss

- Die Fledermaus - Alfred, Eisenstein

Strauss

- Salome - Narraboth
- Die Frau ohne Schatten - Die Stimme des Jünglings

Verdi

- Attila - Foresto
- I Lombardi alla prima crociata - Oronte
- La traviata - Alfredo Germont
- Macbeth - Macduff
- Nabucco - Ismaele
- Rigoletto - Duca di Mantua
- Falstaff - Fenton/Bardolfo
- Simon Boccanegra - Gabriele Adorno
- Messa da Requiem

Richard Wagner

- Tannhauser - Walther von der Vogelweide
- The Flying Dutchman - Steuermann
- Tristan und Isolde - Stimme eines jungen Seemanns

== Discography ==
- Antonín Dvořák Stabat Mater, op. 58, Akademischer Chor Zuerich, Universitaetsorchester Innsbruck, December 2010
- Elgar's The Dream of Gerontius, Sydney Philharmonia Choirs, recorded live at Sydney Opera House, June 13, 2010
- Beethoven's Symphony No. 9, Orchestra Sinfonica di Roma, La Vecchia, ASIN B003916FH6 (Allegro)
- Antônio Carlos Gomes's Salvator Rosa (opera), Patrick Shelly, Dorset Opera and the Musicians Union of Great Britain, ASIN B000G16FG6
- "Fernando del Valle" Arias, Eraldo Salmieri The New Symphony Orchestra (Sofia) Producer: Michael A. Skinner, ASIN B00004RKGZ
- "Magna res est amor", Martin Sander, Organ, ASIN B00008ZAZD
- Verdi's Requiem, John Nelson with Staatsphilharmonie Rheinland-Pfalz, ASIN B00IT6SHTA (Naxos)
