= Otello =

1887 opera by Giuseppe Verdi

- Opera by Giuseppe Verdi
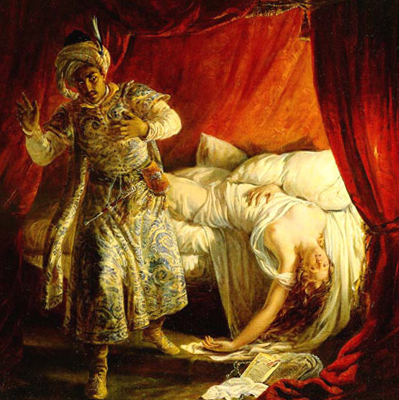
- Otello and Desdemona by Alexandre-Marie Colin, 1829
- Librettist: Arrigo Boito
- Language: Italian
- Based on: Othello by Shakespeare
- Premiere: 5 February 1887; Teatro alla Scala, Milan

Otello (Italian pronunciation: [oˈtɛllo]) is an opera in four acts by Giuseppe Verdi to an Italian libretto by Arrigo Boito, based on Shakespeare's play Othello. It was Verdi's penultimate opera, first performed at the Teatro alla Scala, Milan, on 5 February 1887.

The composer was reluctant to write anything new after the success of Aida in 1871, and he retreated into retirement. It took his Milan publisher Giulio Ricordi the next ten years, first to encourage the revision of Verdi's 1857 Simon Boccanegra by introducing Boito as librettist and then to begin the arduous process of persuading and cajoling Verdi to see Boito's completed libretto for Otello in July/August 1881. However, the process of writing the first drafts of the libretto and the years of their revision, with Verdi all along not promising anything, dragged on. It was not until 1884, five years after the first drafts of the libretto, that composition began, with most of the work finishing in late 1885. When it finally premiered in Milan on 5 February 1887, it proved to be a resounding success, and further stagings of Otello soon followed at leading theatres throughout Europe and America.

== Composition history ==
=== Verdi's intended retirement ===
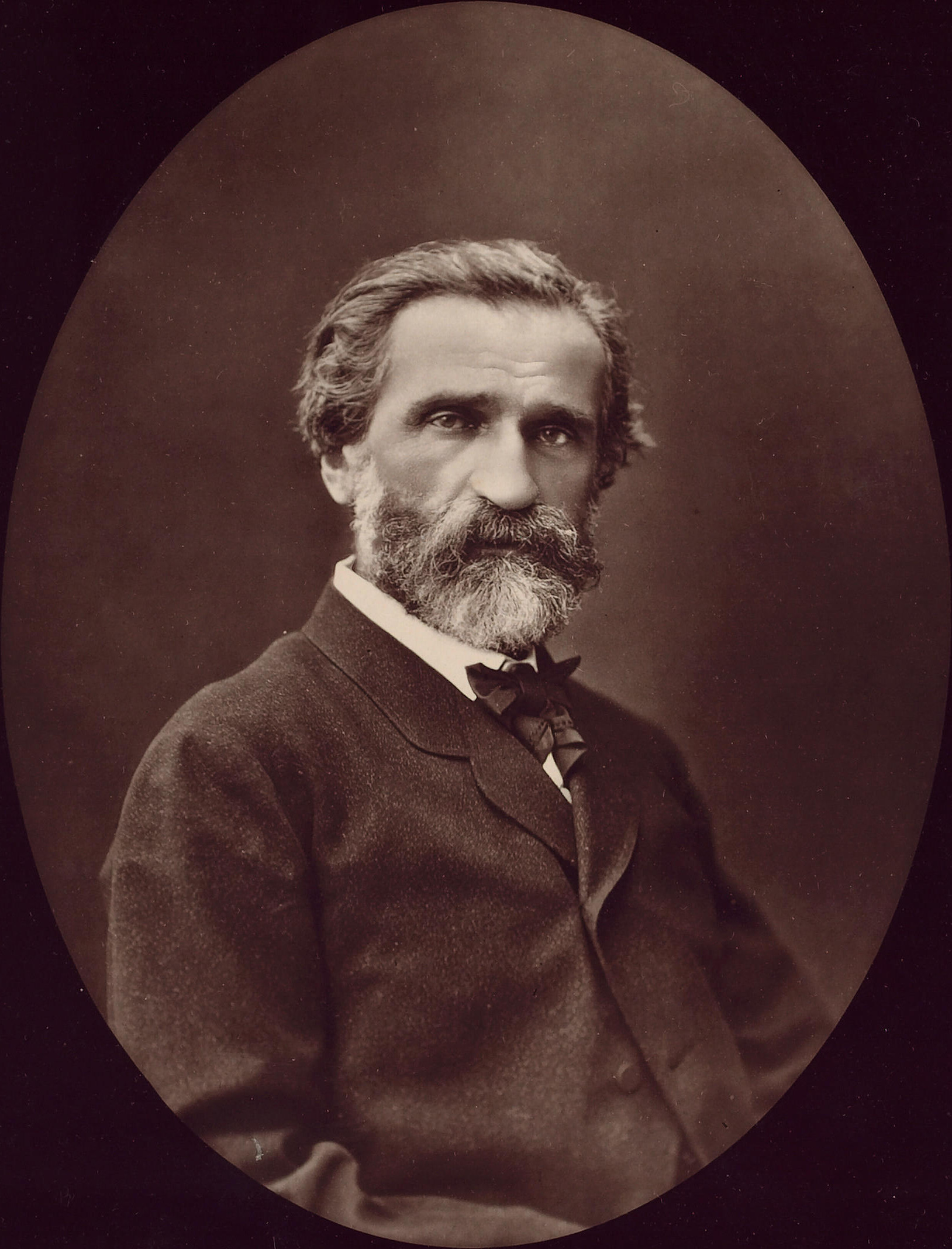
Verdi, c. 1870

After the completion and premiere of his opera Aida in December 1871, Verdi decided that it was time for him to end his successful career as a composer of opera, much as Rossini had done after the completion of the opera William Tell, though he was easily the most popular, and possibly the wealthiest, composer in Italy at the time. However, Verdi's sixties were not good years: as musicologist Julian Budden notes, "he seemed to have entered [those years] in a mood of gloom and depression [..and..] his letters at the time were full of complaints about the Italian theatre, Italian politics and Italian music in general [all] seen by him as sinking beneath a tide of Germanism".

Because of the immense popularity of Verdi's music in Italy by the 1870s, Verdi's retirement seemed to his publisher, Giulio Ricordi, to be a waste of talent and possible profits. Thus a plot of sorts was hatched in order to coax the composer out of retirement to write another opera. Because of the importance of the dramatic aspects of opera to the composer, Verdi was especially selective in his choice of subjects. Consequently, if he were to agree to create another opera after a decade of retirement, the libretto would need to be one that would capture his interest.

During the period when a suitable story was being sought for what became Aida, Ricordi had come across Boito's partly finished libretto of his own opera Nerone, and he even suggested in a letter of February 1870 to Verdi that, with Boito's permission, he set it to music. Verdi ignored it, and so Ricordi tried again in January 1871, enclosing with his letter a copy of Boito's libretto for Boito's friend and collaborator Franco Faccio's Amleto which had been given in 1865 and was revived in February 1871. Nothing came of this approach, although Ricordi persevered in various ways, as seen by the composer's gruff response to the publisher's statement "The whole salvation of the theatre and the art is in your hands" when Verdi wrote in April 1875 that "I cannot take it as but a joke", continuing with "Oh no, never fear, composers for the theatre will never be lacking".

Verdi's refusals continued as the 1870s progressed. Knowing of his interest in the soprano Adelina Patti, Ricordi tried to entice him into writing an opera for her, but Verdi's refusal resulted in another approach via a letter to the composer's wife Giuseppina, who was to present the idea at an opportune time. But she confessed defeat yet again. Clara Maffei also tried, unsuccessfully, in March 1878 to interest Verdi, who replied: "For what reason should I write? What would I succeed in doing?"

While he was attempting to get Verdi involved a new opera, in May 1879 Ricordi also tried to engage the composer in revising Simon Boccanegra. This suggestion, originally expressed ten years before but ignored, was once again shrugged off by Verdi, who sent a note saying that the 1857 score, which had been sent to the composer for review, would remain untouched "just as you sent it to me".

Persisting with further attempts to convince the composer, Ricordi had also broached the idea of a collaboration with Boito for a new opera based on Shakespeare's Othello. Verdi admired the dramatic works of Shakespeare and had, throughout his career, desired to create operas based on his plays, although his one attempt at doing so, Macbeth in 1847, although initially successful, was not well received when revised for performance in Paris in 1865. Because of its relatively straightforward story, the play Othello was selected as a likely target.

Collaborations with Boito in the revision of the 1857 opera Simon Boccanegra helped to convince Verdi of Boito's ability as a librettist. Musicologist Roger Parker speculates that Verdi's final agreement to revise Boccanegra was based on a desire to "test the possibility" of working with Boito before possibly embarking on the larger project. Frank Walker expresses much the same thoughts, noting that "some of the results, such as the magnificent scene in the Council Chamber and the villainous Paolo's Iago-like recitatives, foreshadow the later opera."

=== Verdi is introduced to the idea of Otello ===
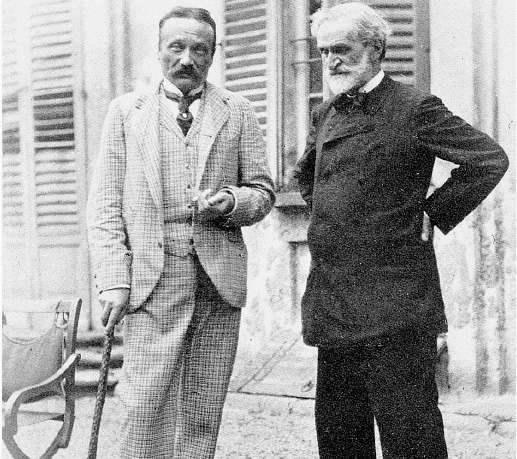
Boito and Verdi at Sant'Agata

Verdi visited Milan on 30 June 1879, and conducted his Requiem Mass in a benefit performance at La Scala. He received the great acclaim of the public, which included the La Scala orchestra playing outside his hotel. Walker assumes that it was both Ricordi and Faccio who stage managed the effects to give the composer the sense of being welcome and respected in Milan.

Finally, after some plotting, Ricordi, in conjunction with Verdi's friend, the conductor Franco Faccio, subtly introduced the idea of a new opera to Verdi. During a dinner at Verdi's Milan residence during the summer of 1879, Ricordi and Faccio guided the conversation towards Shakespeare's play Othello and to the librettist Arrigo Boito (whom Ricordi claimed to be a great fan of the play also). Ricordi told the story to Giuseppe Adami, a librettist for three of Puccini's operas:

The idea of a new opera arose during a dinner among friends, when I turned the conversation, by chance, on Shakespeare and on Boito. At the mention of Othello I saw Verdi fix his eyes on me, with suspicion, but with interest. He had certainly understood; he had certainly reacted. I believed the time was ripe.

Suggestions were made, despite initial skepticism on the part of the composer, that Boito would be interested in creating a new libretto based upon the play. Within several days, Ricordi approached Verdi with the request that he would like to visit Sant' Agata "with a friend" in September. Verdi's reaction was clearly non-committal: "I wish absolutely to avoid committing myself [...] The best thing ... is for him to send me the finished poem".

Meanwhile, Boito began work on the libretto in spite of illness and, by late October/early November had sent a copy of the work so far. After appealing to Giuseppina, Ricordi was told that the Verdis would be coming to Milan and that he would meet privately with Boito. However, she noted in her letter of 7 November: "Between ourselves, what Boito has so far written of the African seems to please him, and is very well done."

At this point the opera was being referred to as Iago rather than Otello, due to the tradition—"an unwritten law of the theatre"—that any new opera would have a new title rather than that of one still in the repertoire, in this case by Rossini.

=== From libretto to first performance: 1879 to 1887 ===
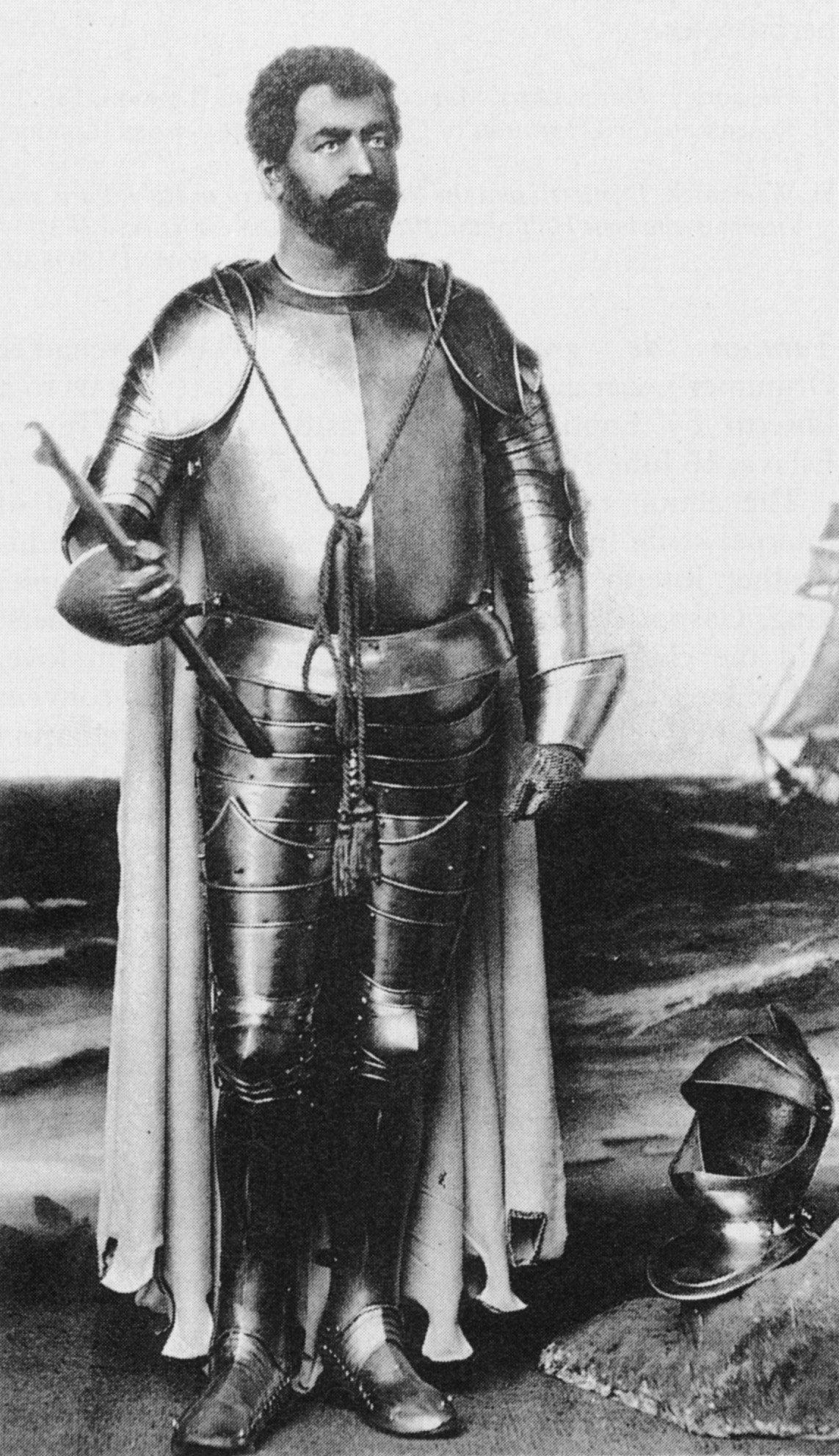
Francesco Tamagno as Otello in a costume designed by Alfred Edel for the original production

The process of writing the first drafts of the libretto and the years of their revision, with Verdi all along not promising anything, dragged on. As Walker charts it, the opera was completed:

in three comparatively short bouts of composition: the first, very brief, was at Genoa in March 1884 [five years after the first drafts of the libretto began!]; the second, the principal one, at Genoa from December 1884 to April 1885; the third at Sant' Agata from the middle of September to early October 1885.

By late August 1881, it appears that the text of the finale of act 3, over which there had been some considerable discussion (with ideas exchanged between both men) was sent to Verdi, who responded in a long letter from Milan regarding his feelings about its overall structure, the role of the chorus, and other issues. Throughout 1882 and 1883 very little happened, although during the winter of 1883 Verdi and Boito met in Genoa where the Verdis spent their winters, but it prompted Ricordi for three Christmases in a row to send a cake to Verdi with the figure of the Moor—in chocolate—on the top. In order to keep information about the composition within the group, this gesture may have been the cause for the name given to the project for many years, "chocolate", as in Boito's letter of 1864 noting that "the manufacture of chocolate was going ahead".

Early the following year, Verdi began to compose and on 20 March 1884, in a letter from Boito to Ricordi, the librettist announced that Verdi had begun with the "opening of first act and seems to be working with fervor". There then occurred an event which unsettled both Verdi and Boito, and which nearly caused the project to come to a complete stop. While attending a banquet in Naples following the successful presentation of his opera Mefistofele, Boito gave an interview to a journalist and, in trying to keep information about the proposed Otello as quiet as possible, appears to have been misquoted by another journalist who overheard part of the conversation. The key point was that Boito, himself a composer, appeared to want to compose the music for Otello himself. When Verdi read this in a Milan newspaper, he was horrified and, in a letter to Faccio (rather than directly confronting Boito) stated that he wanted Faccio to directly tell the librettist that "I will give him his manuscript intact, without a shadow of resentment, without rancor of any kind".

When he heard of the newspaper report, Boito was horrified. Writing immediately to Verdi, he states:

The theme and my libretto are yours by right of conquest. You alone can set Othello to music—all the dramatic creations you have given us proclaim the truth.
[He continues by discussing his own preoccupation with Emperor Nero and his love for the period of Ancient Roman history, pointing to his ongoing work on his own opera, Nerone]

... no other subject in the world can distract me, not even Shakespeare's Othello, could distract me from my theme.
[He asks the composer, given the above comments, whether he really believes that he would accept his offer. Boito begs Verdi not to abandon Otello:] It is predestined for you. Create it. You had begun work upon it [so..] take up you pen again and write me soon: 'Dear Boito, do me the favour of altering these verses, etc. etc...'

Verdi's response, which came right away was quite blunt: in addition to complaining of his age, his years of service, and raising other objections, he states: "The conclusion is that all this has cast a chill over this Otello, and stiffened the hand that had begun to trace out a few bars!", but, in total contrast, Boito appears to have simply decided to carry on. Albeit "somewhat disquieted", he immediately proposes "a sort of evil Credo [which] I did... for my own comfort and personal satisfaction, because I felt the need of doing it". On 3 May, Verdi wrote back, calming this down: "Most beautiful this Credo; most powerful and wholly Shakespearian... it would be well to leave this Otello in peace for a bit ... [and encouraging Boito to come to Sant'Agata where] "we shall be able to talk it over again, and by then with the necessary calm". Boito did visit Verdi in September for three days.

"It seems impossible, but it's true all the same! I'm busy, writing!! ... without purpose, without worries, without thinking of what will happen next..." So Verdi wrote to Boito, with a request for a few more lines for act two, to which the librettist immediately responded: "One can't escape one's destiny, and by a law of intellectual affinity that tragedy of Shakespeare's is predestined for you".

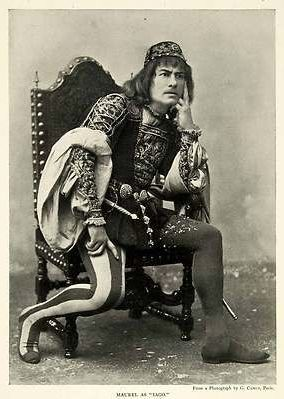
Baritone Victor Maurel, the first Iago

Verdi's second burst of creative energy lasted until mid-April 1885, and was followed by the usual summer break and a lack of any activity. He confesses to Boito in a letter of 10 September of that year, when he invites him to come to Sant'Agata the following Sunday, stating "since I've been here [from the end of April] (I blush to say it) I've done nothing!" It was during this time that the fourth act was pulled together. Walker speculates that Boito's visit and his conversations with the composer must have had some effect on Verdi because, on 5 October, Verdi made the announcement: "I have finished the fourth act, and I breathe again".

Scoring took another year which, from January 1886 onward, involved the librettist in re-writes and additions at Verdi's request. It was at this time that it was decided to call the opera Otello rather than Iago (as noted above). Verdi's letter to Boito in January settles the matter: "I would find it hypocritical not to call it Otello. Emanuele Muzio (Verdi's long-time assistant) tells Ricordi in March that the love duet in act 1 was finished and performed.

In May, Verdi "hit upon the precise form of one of the most famous entrances in all opera" – Otello's "Esultate" – in act 1. Boito modified his verses accordingly. Other minor changes and proposed revisions were wrapped up into September so that Verdi could write to Ricordi on 9 September: "Tomorrow I shall send to Casa Ricordi, completely finished, all the first act and all scene vi of the third; and thus with the fourth, already sent, perhaps three-fifths of the Moor are ready".

But on 1 November 1886, in a laconic communication, Verdi was able to proclaim: "DEAR BOITO, It is finished! All honour to us! (and to Him!!). Farewell. G. VERDI".(sic) This left only a few minor tweaks to be done, with Boito providing two more lines in December and Verdi writing to him on the 18th saying "I have just consigned to [Ricordi] the last acts of Otello! Poor Othello!... He won't come back here any more!!!" The librettist replied: "The Moor will come back no more to knock on the door of the Palazzo Doria [Verdi's Genoa residence], but you will go to meet the Moor at La Scala. Otello exists. The great dream has become reality".

== Performance history ==
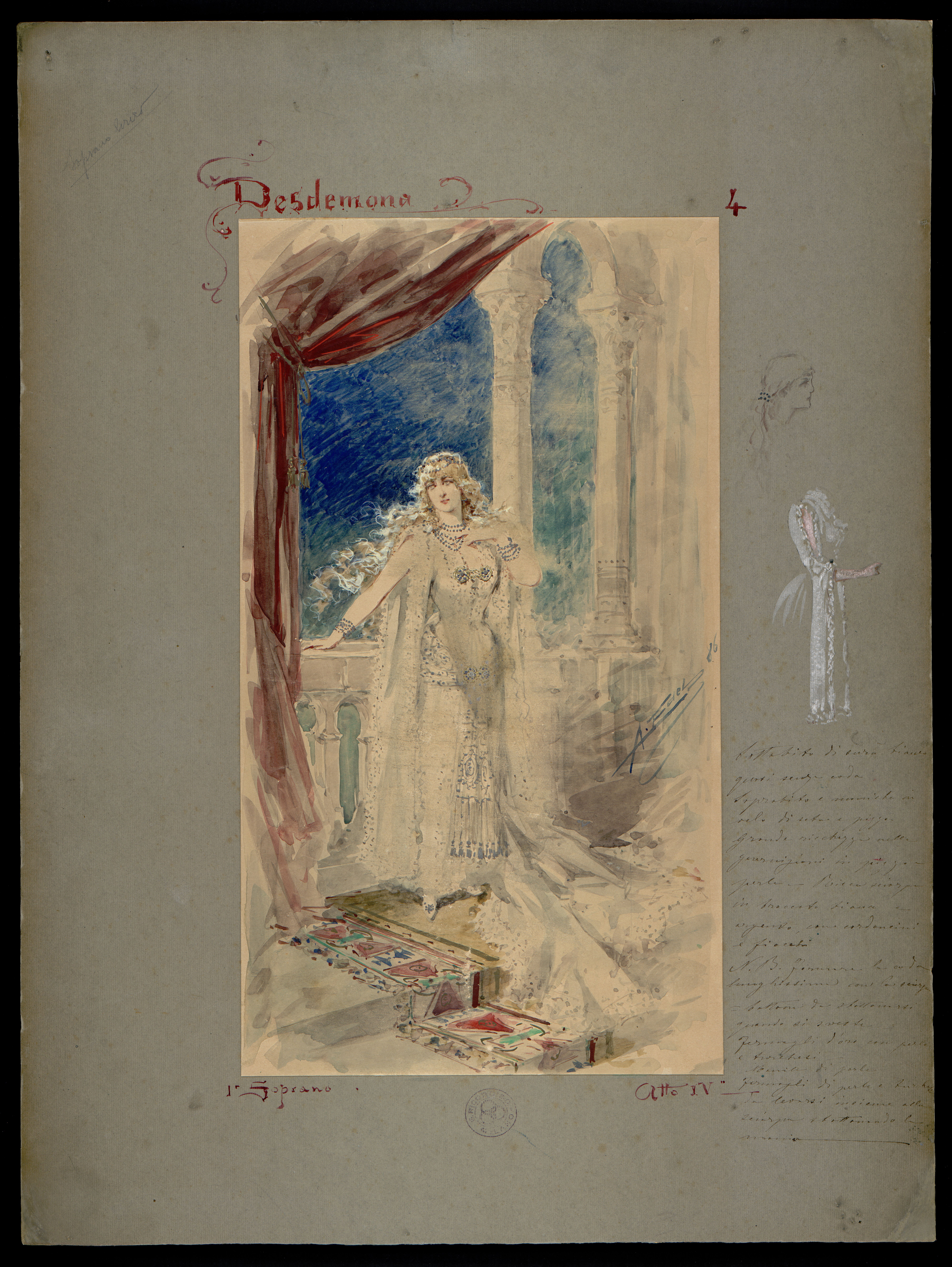
Costume design by Alfredo Edel for Desdemona in Act IV

=== Premiere ===
As the Italian public became aware that the retired Verdi was composing another opera, rumors about it abounded. At the same time, many of the most illustrious conductors, singers and opera-house managers in Europe were vying for an opportunity to play a part in Otello's premiere, despite the fact that Faccio and La Scala, Milan, had already been selected as the conductor and the venue for the first performance. The two male protagonists had been selected, too: Italy's foremost dramatic tenor, Francesco Tamagno, was to sing Otello while the esteemed French singing-actor Victor Maurel would assume the villainous baritone role of Iago. Romilda Pantaleoni, a well-known singing-actress, was assigned Desdemona's soprano part.

Upon the completion of the opera, preparations for the initial performance were conducted in absolute secrecy and Verdi reserved the right to cancel the premiere up to the last minute. In particular, the composer expressed reservations about Tamagno's softer singing, though not about the power and ring of his vocalism in dramatic passages of the score.

Verdi need not have worried: Otello's debut proved to be a resounding success. The audience's enthusiasm for Verdi was shown by the 20 curtain calls that he took at the end of the opera. Further stagings of Otello soon followed at leading theatres throughout Europe and America.

=== Subsequent productions ===
The opera was first seen in the US at the Academy of Music in New York on 16 April 1888 and in the UK on 5 July 1889 in London. At its first appearance in Vienna (14 March 1888), the title role was sung by Hermann Winkelmann, who had created the title role in Wagner's Parsifal at Bayreuth in 1882.

Otello was first performed in Buenos Aires, Argentina in 1888 by two opera companies in quick succession and the casts included singers who had performed main roles in the world premiere in Milan the year before. On 12 June 1888 the opera was first performed at the Teatro Politeama by the Ciacchi opera company, featuring Roberto Stagno (Otello), Romilda Pantaleoni (the Desdemona in the world premiere), and Delfino Menotti (Iago). A few days later, on 6 July 1888, the Ferrari opera company presented the opera at the old Teatro Colón with Francesco Tamagno (the Otello in the world premiere), Mila Kupfer-Berger (Desdemona), and Jules Devoyod (Iago).

Otello was given its Paris premiere by the Opéra at the Palais Garnier on 12 October 1894 with Albert Saléza in the title role, Rose Caron as Desdemona, and Paul Taffanel conducting. It was performed in a French translation by Arrigo Boito and Camille Du Locle. Verdi composed a short ballet for the finale of Act 3 (ceremony of welcome for the Venetian ambassadors). The production was directed by Alexandre Lapissida, the costumes were designed by Charles Bianchini, and the sets, by Marcel Jambon (Act I); Amable and Eugène Gardy (Act II); Eugène Carpezat (Act III); and Auguste Alfred Rubé and Philippe Chaperon (Act IV).

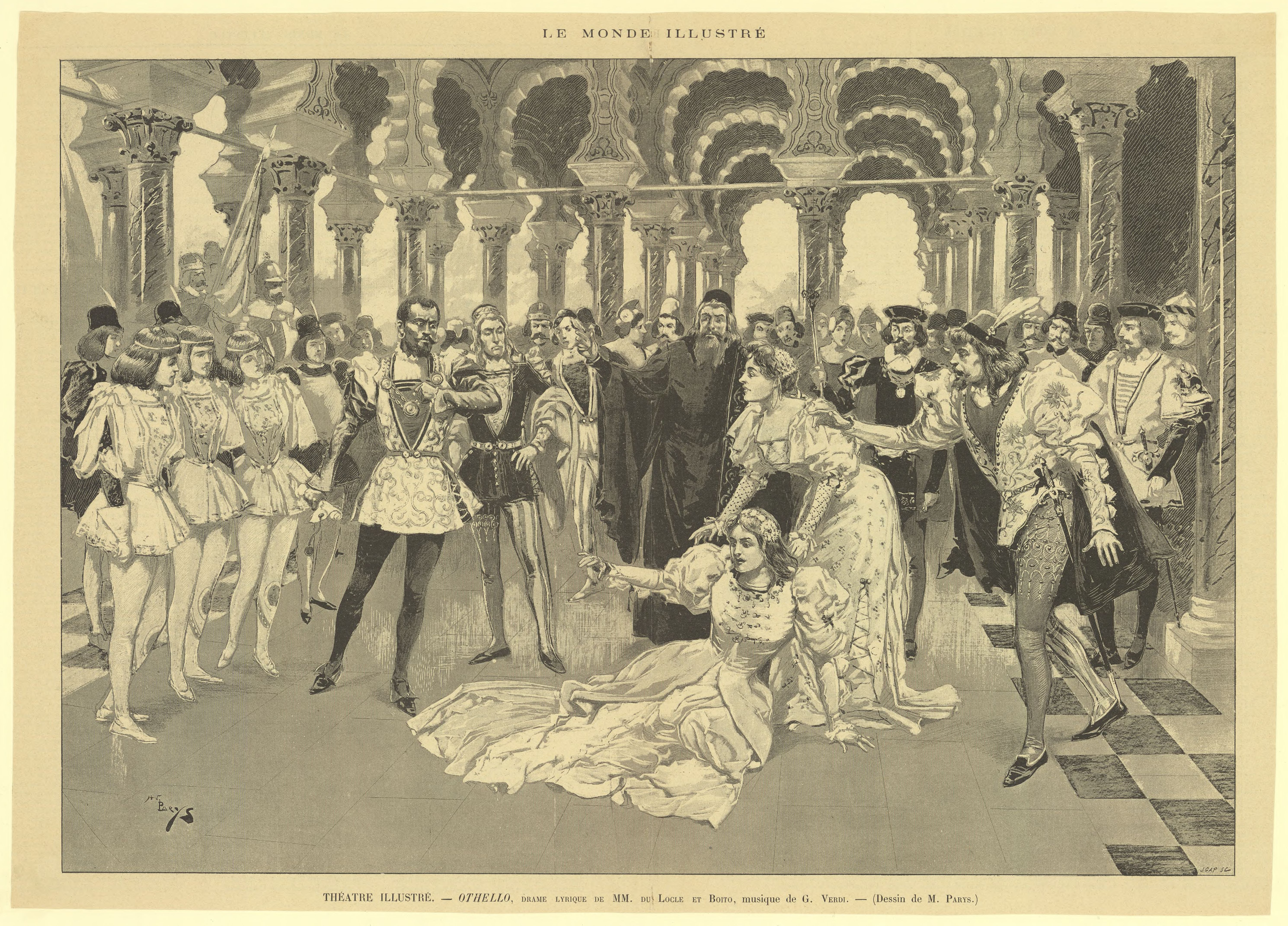
Illustration from Le Monde illustré of the 1894 Paris premiere

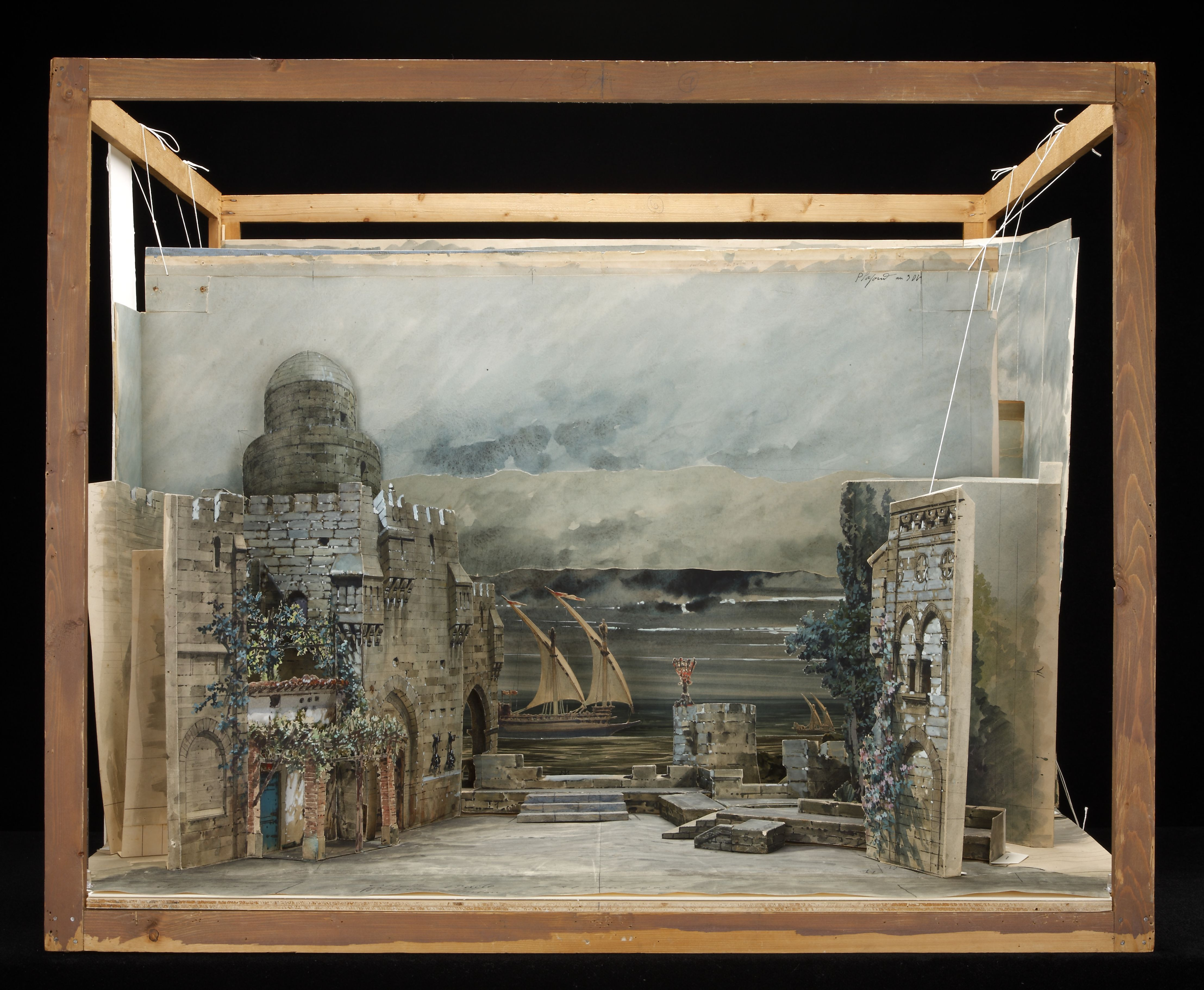
Set-design model by Marcel Jambon for Act 1 of the Paris premiere

Today, the opera is frequently performed throughout the world, a staple of the standard repertoire.

=== Roles, their demands, and the singers who met them ===
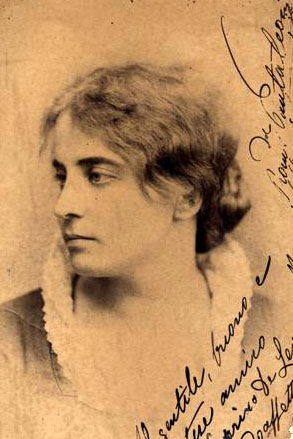
Romilda Pantaleoni, the first Desdemona

Since the three leading roles of the opera (Otello, Desdemona and Iago) are among Verdi's most demanding, both vocally and dramatically, some of the most illustrious singers of the past 130 years have made Otello part of their repertoire. Famous Otellos of the past have included Tamagno, the role's trumpet-voiced creator, as well as Giovanni Battista De Negri, Albert Alvarez, Francesc Viñas, Giuseppe Borgatti, Antonio Paoli, Giovanni Zenatello, Renato Zanelli, Giovanni Martinelli, Aureliano Pertile, Francesco Merli, Giacomo Lauri-Volpi, Frank Mullings, Leo Slezak, Jose Luccioni, Ramón Vinay, Mario Del Monaco, James McCracken, Jon Vickers, David Rendall, Jeffrey Lawton and Carlo Cossutta. Pre-Second World War Wagnerian tenors such as Jacques Urlus, Heinrich Knote, Alexander Kirchner, Lauritz Melchior and Franz Völker also undertook the part (usually singing it in German). The Russian heroic tenor Ivan Yershov was a renowned pre-World War I Otello in his native country. His compatriot Arnold Azrikan achieved his greatest recognition as a dramatic tenor in Otello. For this performance he was awarded the Stalin Prize in 1946. Enrico Caruso was studying Otello when he died unexpectedly in 1921, thus thwarting the New York Metropolitan Opera company's plans to stage the opera as a new vehicle for its star tenor.

Currently, Plácido Domingo has appeared in more video productions of the opera than any other tenor. Also, he has recorded the complete role several times on CD and appeared in numerous stage productions of the work on both sides of the Atlantic. In his book My First Forty Years, Domingo has written about different approaches over the years towards singing the role of Otello:

As to the other question — that of singing roles that, according to self-proclaimed experts, we ought not to be singing — I have a little story to tell. When I decided to sing Otello, many people told me that I was crazy. Mario Del Monaco, they said, had had the proper kind of voice for the role, and my voice was nothing like his. Twenty years earlier, Del Monaco had been warned not to sing Otello because his voice was nothing like that of Ramon Vinay, who was then performing the opera all over the world. Vinay, of course, had heard that only a tenor with a piercing sound like Giovanni Martinelli's ought to sing the part. Some years earlier, Martinelli had had Antonin Trantoul, who had sung Otello at La Scala in the twenties, held up to him as a shining example; but at La Scala, those who still remembered the very first Otello, Francesco Tamagno, had found Trantoul completely unsatisfactory. But there exists a letter from Verdi to his publisher in which the composer makes it quite clear that Tamagno left a great deal to be desired.

A long lineage of renowned baritones have sung Iago since 1887. Among them: Victor Maurel (the role's first exponent), Mattia Battistini, Mario Ancona, Antonio Scotti, Titta Ruffo, Pasquale Amato, Carlo Galeffi and Lawrence Tibbett. Leading post-war exponents of the part have included Giuseppe Valdengo, Leonard Warren, Robert Merrill, Tito Gobbi, Sherrill Milnes, Dietrich Fischer-Dieskau and James Morris. Many lyric sopranos have also sung the role of Desdemona since 1887, including Renata Tebaldi (1954), Leonie Rysanek (1960), Gwyneth Jones (1968), Mirella Freni (1974), Kiri Te Kanawa (1974), Margaret Price (1977), Renata Scotto (1978), Katia Ricciarelli (1985), Cheryl Studer (1993), Renée Fleming (1996) and Sonya Yoncheva (2015).

=== Blackface controversy ===
For many years it was common for white singers to wear dark makeup when playing Otello. The Metropolitan Opera stopped the practice in 2015. Some have argued that using dark makeup for the character is a matter of costuming, and not a true example of racist blackface. The Metropolitan decision led to calls for casting more people of color in opera.

== Roles ==
Roles, voice types, premiere cast
Role	Voice type	Premiere cast, 5 February 1887 Conductor: Franco Faccio
Otello, a Moorish general	tenor	Francesco Tamagno
Desdemona, his wife	soprano	Romilda Pantaleoni
Iago, Otello's ensign	baritone	Victor Maurel
Emilia, wife of Iago and maid of Desdemona	mezzo-soprano	Ginevra Petrovich
Cassio, Otello's captain	tenor	Giovanni Paroli
Roderigo, a gentleman of Venice	tenor	Vincenzo Fornari
Lodovico, ambassador of the Venetian Republic	bass	Francesco Navarini
Montano, former Governor of Cyprus	bass	Napoleone Limonta
A herald	bass	Angelo Lagomarsino
Chorus: Venetian soldiers and sailors; and Cypriot townsfolk and children

== Synopsis ==
Time: The late 16th century.
Place: A coastal city on the island of Cyprus.

=== Act 1 ===
A town in Cyprus, outside the castle. An inn with a pergola, in the background the quayside and sea. It is evening. Lightning, thunder, gale force winds.

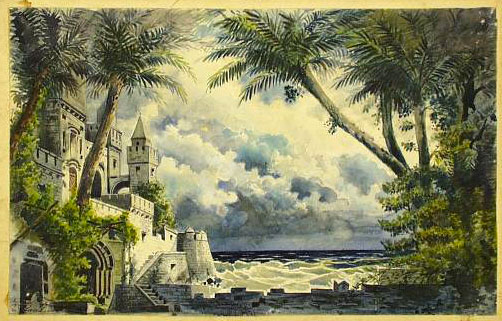
Otello, act 1. Teatro Costanzi Rome-1887; set design by Giovanni Zuccarelli

On a stormy evening, the people of Cyprus anxiously await the arrival of the new governor, Otello, from a naval battle with the Turks (Chorus, Montano, Cassio, Iago, Roderigo: Una vela! / "A sail!"). For a moment it seems as if Otello's ship will founder, to the delight of Otello's treacherous ensign, Iago, but Otello arrives safely and announces that the Turkish fleet has been destroyed, and the Cypriots cheer (Otello, chorus: Esultate! L'orgoglio musulmano sepolto è in mar / "Rejoice! The Muslim’s pride is buried in the sea").

Iago offers to help the young Venetian gentleman Roderigo in his seduction of Otello's wife, Desdemona – Iago envies Otello's success and longs to destroy the Moor (Iago, Roderigo: Roderigo, ebben che pensi? / "Well, Roderigo, what are you thinking?"). Among his grievances, Iago is outraged that Otello has appointed Cassio to be the captain of the navy, a position that Iago hoped to have. The people of Cyprus celebrate the safe return of Otello and his men by lighting a bonfire and drinking (Chorus: Fuoco di gioia!/ "Fire of joy").

Iago proposes a toast to Otello and his wife, while Cassio praises Desdemona (Iago, Cassio, Chorus, Roderigo: Roderigo, beviam! / "Roderigo, let's drink!"). Iago offers Cassio more wine, but Cassio says he has had enough. Iago pressures him and offers a toast to Otello and Desdemona. Cassio gives in. Iago sings a drinking song and continues to pour Cassio wine (Iago, Cassio, Roderigo, chorus: Inaffia l'ugola! / "Wet your throat").

Montano enters and calls for Cassio to begin his watch; he is surprised to find Cassio drunk and barely able to stand upright. Iago lies to Montano, telling him that this is how Cassio spends every evening. Roderigo laughs at Cassio's drunkenness and Cassio attacks him. Montano tells Cassio to calm down, but Cassio draws his sword and threatens to crack open Montano's head. (Montano, Cassio, Iago, Roderigo, chorus: Capitano, v'attende la fazione ai baluardi / "Captain, the guard awaits you on the ramparts".) Cassio and Montano begin to duel, and Iago sends Roderigo to call the alarm. Montano is wounded and the fight is stopped only by the appearance of Otello.

Otello orders Montano and Cassio to lower their swords. He then asks "honest Iago" to explain how the duel began, but Iago says he doesn't know. Otello then turns to Cassio, who is embarrassed and cannot excuse his actions. When Otello discovers that Montano is wounded, he becomes enraged. Desdemona enters, and, upon seeing that his bride's rest has been disturbed, Otello declares that Cassio is no longer Captain. (Otello, Iago, Cassio, Montano: Abbasso le spade / "Down with your swords".) He tells Iago to patrol the town to restore quiet, calls for help for Montano and orders everyone to return to their houses.

The Cypriots leave Otello alone with Desdemona. Together Otello and Desdemona recall why they fell in love. Otello, in an ecstasy of joy, invites death, fearing that he will never know such happiness again. Desdemona prays that their love will remain unchanged. They kiss, overcome with love for each other. (Otello, Desdemona: Già nella notte densa s'estingue ogni clamor /"Now in the dark night all noise is silenced".)

=== Act 2 ===
A hall on the ground floor of the castle, divided by a glass partition from the garden at the back, with a balcony.

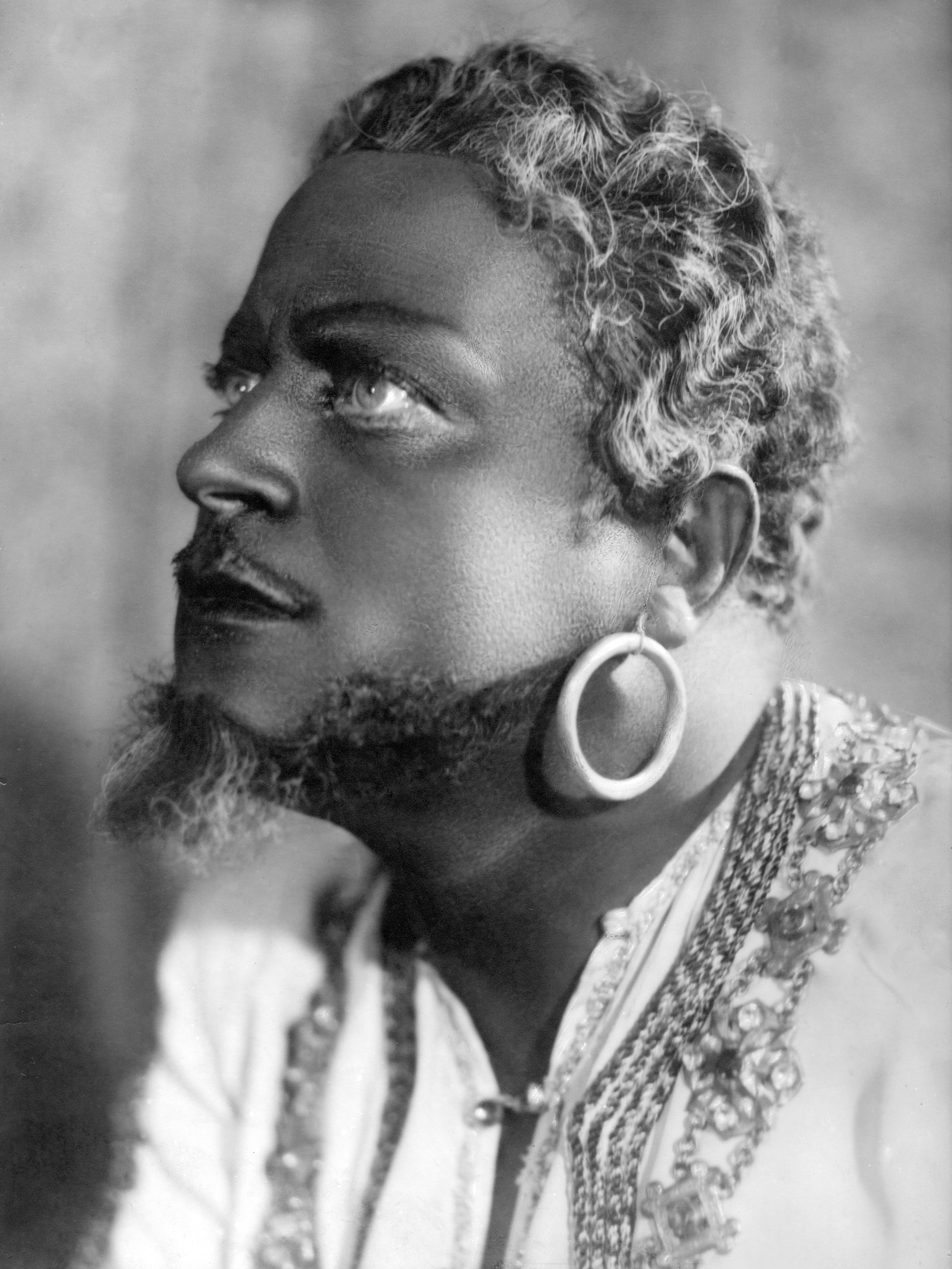
Arnold Azrikan as Otello

Iago suggests to Cassio that he should ask Desdemona to talk to Otello about his demotion; Desdemona can influence her husband to reinstate him (Iago, Cassio: Non ti crucciar / "Do not fret"). Desdemona and Emilia can be seen walking the garden. Cassio approaches Desdemona. Watching from the room, Iago voices his nihilistic beliefs and hatred of humankind (Credo in un Dio crudel / "I believe in a cruel God").

Otello enters the room; Iago, pretending not to notice him, says that he is deeply troubled. Cassio sees Otello from afar and goes discreetly away. Otello asks what's wrong, but Iago gives only vague answers. Finally, he hints that Cassio and Desdemona are having an affair. Otello begins to get suspicious, but declares that he needs proof before believing that Desdemona has been unfaithful. (Iago, Otello: Ciò m'accora... Che parli? / "That worries me..." "What did you say?") Iago warns Otello against jealousy, but also advises him to be vigilant.

A crowd of children, sailors, and Cypriots sing to Desdemona, praising her beauty and purity (Chorus, Iago, children, Desdemona, Otello: Dove guardi splendono raggi / "Wherever you look, brightness shines..."). They present her with gifts and wish her happiness before leaving.

Desdemona carries Cassio's request for reinstatement to Otello. Otello sourly tells her to ask him another time; as she persists, he grows impatient and says he has a headache. Desdemona offers to wrap his head in a handkerchief Otello once gave her, linen embroidered with strawberries. Otello throws it to the ground and says he doesn't need it (Desdemona, Otello: D'un uom che geme sotto il tuo disdegno la preghiera ti porto / "I bring a petition from one who suffers under your displeasure"). Emilia picks up the handkerchief. Desdemona asks for Otello's forgiveness. Aside, Iago demands that Emilia give him the handkerchief. When she refuses, Iago forcibly takes it from her.

"Sì, pel ciel marmoreo giuro!"
1914 recording by Titta Ruffo and Enrico Caruso

Otello dismisses the others, and declares that he now believes that Desdemona may be deceiving him (Otello: Ora e per sempre addio sante memorie / "Now and forever farewell, holy memories"). Iago returns, and the jealous Otello demands proof of Desdemona's infidelity. Iago says that once, when he and Cassio were sleeping in the same room, he heard Cassio talking to Desdemona in a dream. In the dream, says Iago, Cassio told Desdemona that they must be careful to conceal their love. (Iago: Era la notte, Cassio dormia / "It was night, Cassio was sleeping".) Iago says that dreams don't prove anything, but remarks that he saw Cassio carrying Desdemona's strawberry-embroidered handkerchief just the day before. Otello swears vengeance on Desdemona and Cassio, and Iago joins him in his vow (Otello, Iago: Sì, pel ciel marmoreo giuro / "Yes, by the marble heavens I swear").

=== Act 3 ===
The great hall of the castle. To the right, a large colonnade leading to a smaller hall, in the back of which is a balcony. Otello and Iago talking in the hall as a herald enters.

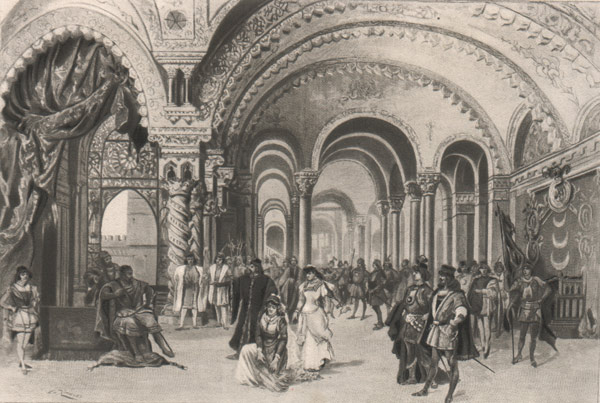
The Act 3 set at the 1887 premiere in Milan. Illustration by Ed. Ximenes after the original stage design by Carlo Ferrario.

A herald brings news of the approach of ambassadors from Venice. Iago explains to Otello that he will lure Cassio here and talk with him while Otello watches, hidden. He leaves to go get Cassio. (Iago: Qui trarrò Cassio / "Here I will bring Cassio".)

Desdemona enters and reminds Otello of Cassio's request. Otello says that his headache has returned, and asks Desdemona to wrap her handkerchief around his head. When Desdemona produces a different handkerchief, Otello demands the one with strawberries. When she says she does not have it, Otello says that it was a talisman, and troubles will befall her if she loses it. Desdemona says that he is trying to ignore Cassio's plea, and as she asks him about Cassio, he demands the handkerchief ever more insistently. (Desdemona, Otello: Dio ti giocondi, o sposo / "God keep you merry, husband".) Desdemona protests that she is faithful; Otello sends her away (Desdemona, Otello: Esterrefatta fisso lo sguardo tuo tremendo / "Terrified, I face your dreadful look").

Otello laments his fate (Dio! mi potevi scagliar tutti i mali / "God, you could have thrown every evil at me" ). When Iago calls out "Cassio is here!" Otello hides as Iago and Cassio enter. Cassio says he had hoped to see Desdemona here, for he wanted to know whether she had been successful with Otello (Iago, Cassio, Otello: Vieni; l'aula è deserta / "Come, the hall is deserted"). Iago asks him to tell of his adventures with that woman. Cassio asks which woman, and, softly, so that Otello cannot hear, Iago says "Bianca" (the name of Cassio's actual lover). As Cassio laughs about his romantic adventures, Otello assumes he is speaking of Desdemona. In a conversation only partially heard, Cassio seems to be telling Iago that another woman, a secret admirer, left him a handkerchief as a token. At Iago's urging, Cassio produces it, whereupon Iago seizes it—for it is Desdemona's—and holds it out where he knows Otello can see it. He then returns it to Cassio and teases him, while in his hiding place Otello fumes (Iago, Cassio, Otello: Questa è una ragna dove il tuo cuor casca / "This is a spiderweb in which your heart is caught").

Bugles sound, announcing the arrival of the Venetian ambassador, Lodovico. Iago warns Cassio that he should leave unless he wants to see Otello. Cassio exits, and Otello asks Iago how he should kill his wife. Iago advises Otello to kill Desdemona by suffocating her in her bed, while he will take care of Cassio. Otello promotes Iago to Captain.

Lodovico, Desdemona, Emilia, Roderigo, and other dignitaries enter. When Lodovico notes Cassio's absence, Iago tells him that Cassio is out of favor. Desdemona interrupts, telling Lodovico that she hopes he will soon be restored. Otello calls her a demon and almost strikes her violently but is held back by Lodovico. Otello then calls for Cassio. (Lodovico, Otello, Desdemona, Emilia, Iago, chorus: Il Doge ed il Senato salutano l'eroe trionfatore / "The Doge and the Senate greet the triumphant hero".) Cassio enters and Otello reads (mixing in insults to Desdemona) a letter from the Doge, announcing that he (Otello) has been called back to Venice and Cassio is to succeed him as governor of Cyprus. Enraged, Otello throws Desdemona to the ground. (Otello, Roderigo, Iago, Cassio, Lodovico: Messeri! il Doge mi richiama a Venezia / "Gentlemen! The Doge recalls me to Venice".)

Desdemona, on the ground, laments (A terra! … sì … nel livido fango / "Fallen! yes, in the foul mud..."). The various characters express their feelings: Emilia and Lodovico express their sympathy for Desdemona, Cassio marvels at his sudden change of fortune, and Roderigo laments that Desdemona will soon depart. In separate asides, Iago urges Otello to take his revenge as soon as possible, while he will take care of Cassio. He advises Roderigo that the only way to prevent Desdemona from leaving is for Cassio, the new Duke, to die, and suggests that Roderigo murder Cassio that night. (Emilia, Cassio, Desdemona, Roderigo, Lodovico, Iago, Otello, chorus: Quell'innocente un fremito d'odio non ha nè un gesto / "That innocent one is without feeling or gesture of hatred"). In a fury, Otello orders everyone to leave. Desdemona goes to comfort him, but Lodovico pulls her away as Otello curses her. As the others leave, Otello raves about the handkerchief, then collapses. Outside, the crowd of Cypriots hails the victory and glory for Otello, whom they call "the Lion of Venice". Iago presses Otello's forehead with his heel, and snarls, with contemptuous irony: "Ecco il Leone! ("This is the lion!"), and then walks away. (Otello, Desdemona, Emilia, Cassio, Roderigo, Lodovico, Iago, chorus: Fuggite! / "Begone".)

=== Act 4 ===
Desdemona's bedchamber. A bed, a prie-dieu, a table, a mirror, some chairs. A light burns in front of an image of the Madonna which hangs above the prie-dieu. To the right is a door. On the table a light. It is night.

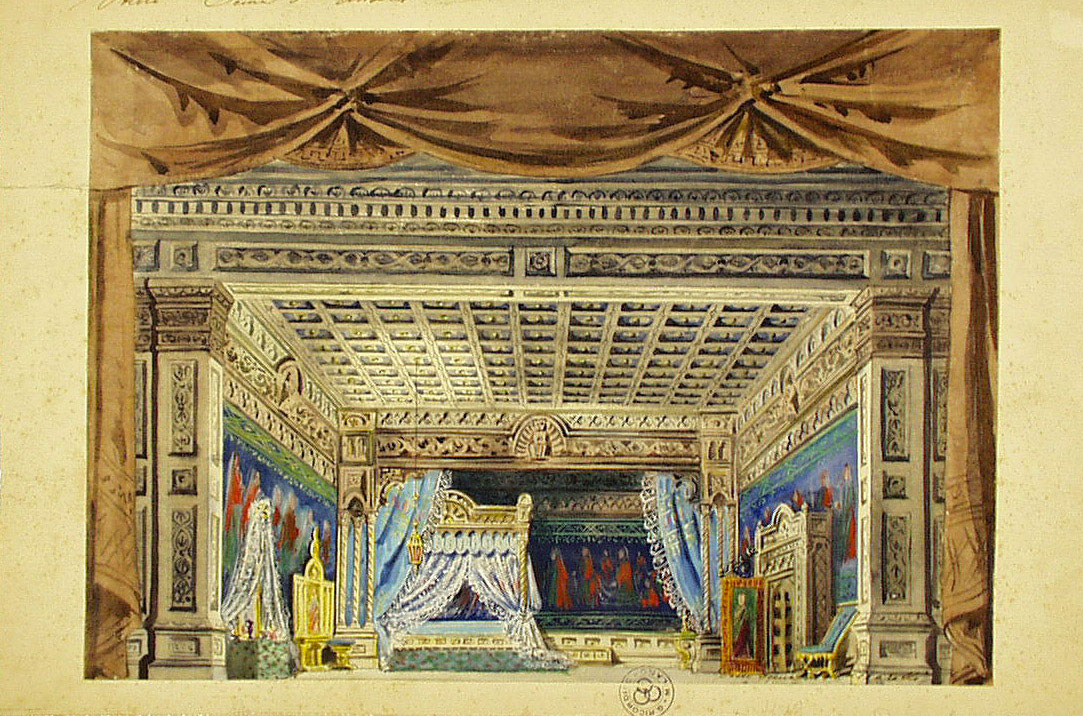
Otello: set design by Giovanni Zuccarelli for Act IV as staged at the Teatro Costanzi in Rome, 1887.

Desdemona is preparing for bed with the assistance of Emilia. She asks Emilia to put out the bridal gown she used on her wedding day, and says that if she dies, she wants to be buried in it. Emilia tells her not to talk about such things. Desdemona recalls how her mother's servant Barbara was abandoned by her lover, and how she used to sing the Willow Song (Desdemona: Piangea cantando nell'erma landa / "Singing, she wept on the lonely hearth"). After Emilia leaves, Desdemona prays (Ave Maria) and then falls asleep.

Silently, Otello enters, with a sword. He kisses his wife three times; she awakens. Otello asks her if she has prayed tonight; she must die, and he does not wish to condemn her soul. She asks God for mercy, both for her and for Otello. Otello accuses her of sin, saying that he must kill her because she loves Cassio. Desdemona denies it and asks that he summon Cassio to testify to her innocence. Otello says that Cassio is already dead. Desdemona, horrified, pleads for mercy, but Otello tells her it's too late and strangles her (Otello, Desdemona: Diceste questa sera le vostre preci / "Have you said your prayers tonight?").

"Niun mi tema"
Francesco Tamagno, the original Otello, sings "Niun mi tema" (Morte d'Otello). This 1903 recording dates from just two years before Tamagno's death.

Emilia knocks at the door, (Emilia: Aprite! Aprite! / "Open up!") announcing that Cassio has killed Roderigo. Desdemona softly calls out that she has been unjustly accused, but refuses to blame Otello. She dies. Emilia calls Otello a murderer; he retorts that Iago gave him proof of Desdemona's infidelity. Otello begins to threaten Emilia, who calls for help. Iago, Cassio, and Lodovico enter. Emilia demands that Iago deny Otello's accusation; he refuses. Otello says that the handkerchief Desdemona gave to Cassio is proof enough. Emilia, horrified, explains that Iago stole the handkerchief from her—Cassio confirms that the handkerchief appeared mysteriously in his lodgings. Montano enters and says that Roderigo, with his dying breath, has revealed Iago's plot. Iago, brandishing his sword, runs away.

After he realizes what has happened, Otello grieves over Desdemona's death. Initially he draws his scimitar (Otello: Niun mi tema / "That none fear me") but then relinquishes it. He then stealthily draws a dagger from his robe (Otello: Ho un'arma ancor! / I still have another weapon!) and stabs himself. Others try to stop him, but it is too late. Before he dies, he drags himself next to his wife and kisses her (Otello: Un bacio...un bacio ancora...ah!...un altro bacio... / A kiss.. another kiss...ah...and yet another kiss). He lies dead next to Desdemona.

== Ballet ==
In 1894, Verdi composed a short ballet for a French production of Otello, which takes place during the third act and precedes the entrance of Lodovico. It is rarely performed as part of the opera.

== Instrumentation ==
Otello is scored for the following instruments:

In the orchestra:

- 3 flutes (the third doubles as a piccolo),
- 2 oboes,
- 1 english horn,
- 2 clarinets,
- 1 bass clarinet,
- 4 bassoons,
- 4 horns,
- 2 cornets,
- 2 trumpets,
- 3 trombones,
- 1 trombone basso,
- 1 harp,
- percussion (timpani, cymbals, bass drum, gong, thunder machine),
- strings (violin I and II, viola, cello, double bass)

Offstage:

- 6 trumpets,
- 4 trombones,
- organ,
- bagpipes,
- mandolins,
- guitars

== See also ==
- After Aida, a stage play dramatizing the inception of Otello
