= Ricarda Jacobi =

German painter (1923–2020)

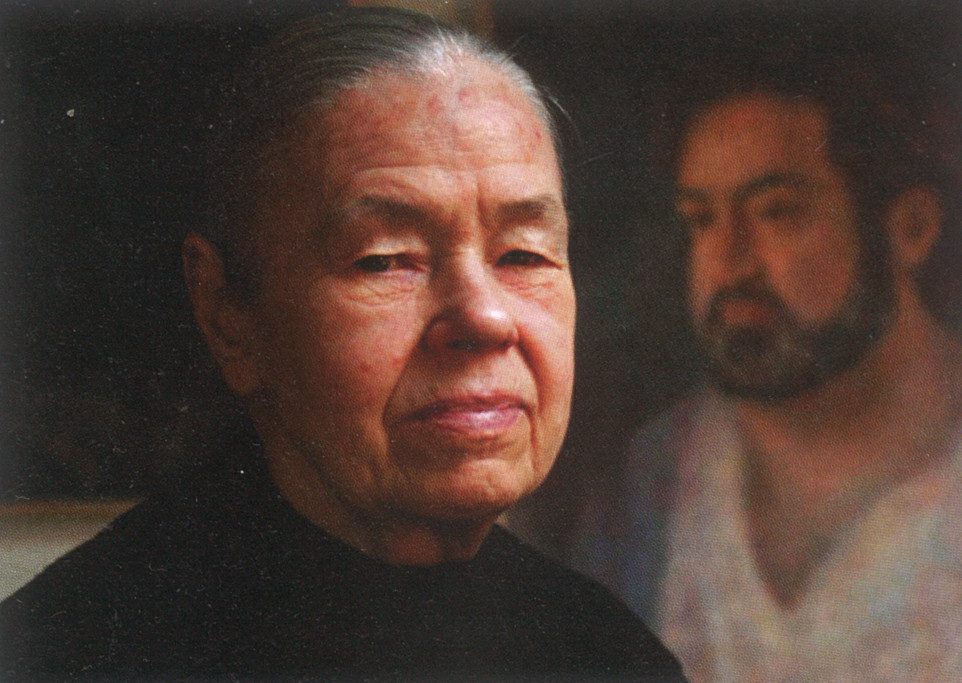
Ricarda Jacobi with tenor Fernando del Valle in background)

Ricarda Jacobi (June 7, 1923 Braunschweig–January 23, 2020 Darmstadt) was a painter and a protégée of Oscar Kokoschka.

== Biography ==
Ricarda Jacobi lived in Darmstadt beginning in 1953. After graduating from high school in Halle, she studied at the Hochschule for Kunsterziehung in Berlin from 1942 to 1944. One of her teachers there was Willy Jaeckel, one of the most important representatives of German Expressionism. She then studied at the Academy of Fine Arts in Munich with Julius Hess.

== Kokoschka ==
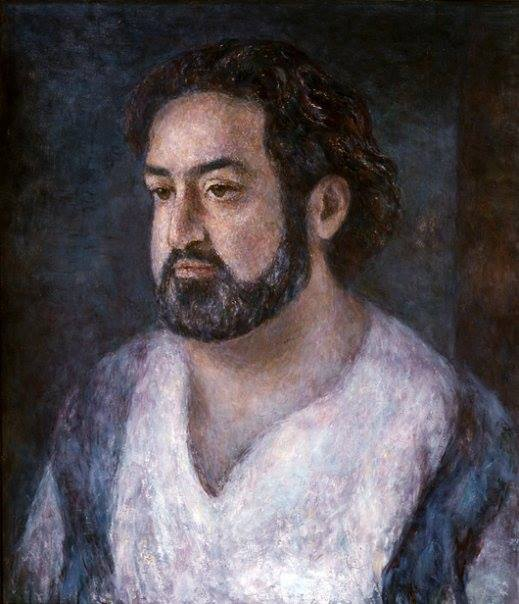
Fernando del Valle by Ricarda Jacobi

From 1946 to 1949 she belonged to the painting class of the famous expressionist Erwin Hahs at Burg Giebichenstein, Halle. In 1953 she participated for the first time in the International Summer Academy of Fine Arts Salzburg "School of Seeing", newly founded by Oskar Kokoschka (1953–1957), with extraordinary success; further stays at this summer academy followed in the following years. Oskar Kokoschka, with whom the artist remained connected throughout his life, became a formative role model for her.

== Life and oeuvre ==
Ricarda Jacobi saw herself primarily as a portraitist. She created an extensive oeuvre of portraits, including several prominent contemporaries. Among them Karl Bohm, featured as the cover of Deutsche Gramophone recordings, tenor Fernando del Valle(2003) and others. Although still life and paintings of flowers are also part of her oeuvre, the main focus of her painting was the search for the image of man.

"Ricarda Jacobi lived in Darmstadt since 1953. After finishing high school in Halle, she studied at the Hochschule für Kunsterziehung in Berlin from 1942 to 1944. One of her teachers there was Willy Jaeckel, one of the most important representatives of German Expressionism. She then studied at the Academy of Fine Arts in Munich with Julius Hess. From 1946 to 1949 she belonged to the painting class of the famous expressionist Erwin Hahs at Burg Giebichenstein, Halle. In 1953 she participated for the first time in the International Summer Academy of Fine Arts Salzburg "School of Seeing", newly founded by Oskar Kokoschka (1953–1957), with extraordinary success; further stays at this summer academy followed in the following years. Oskar Kokoschka, with whom the artist remained connected throughout his life, became a formative role model for her. In August 1954, Kokoschka wrote to Dr. Erich Wiese, director of the Landesmuseum Darmstadt: "I hereby emphatically recommend a young protégé, Miss Ricarda Jacobi, whom I already mentioned in Villeneuve. I see in her a great serious talent, comparable to that of Paula Modersohn. Prof. Dr. Heinrich Petzet, author of the book 'Portraits by Ricarda Jacobi' (Portraits by Ricarda Jacobi) emphasises the portraits of children in 1988: "A picture like Gunter's is of an internalisation that is rarely achieved even in the depiction of older, experienced people ..."

== Death ==
She died on 23 January 2020 in Darmstadt.

== Awards ==
- 1954 – Salzburger Kunstförderpreis
- 1957 – Oskar-Kokoschka-Preis
