= Paul D. Blumenthal =

American physician

Paul D. Blumenthal (born March 1, 1952) is an American physician, researcher, cervical cancer prevention advocate, and abortion provider who is certified in obstetrics and gynecology. He is known for his cervical cancer, abortion, and contraception research. He is also known for his commitment to international women's health—evidenced by his contribution to public health initiatives in over 30 countries.

== Early life and personal life ==
Blumenthal was born and raised in Chicago, Illinois, US. He now resides between Palo Alto, California, and Santa Fe, New Mexico. He is married to Lynne Gaffikin and has one son.

== Education ==
Following high school, Blumenthal attended Tel Aviv University (1969–1970), completing his undergraduate education in 1972 at the University of Illinois cum laude with a Bachelor of Arts in history.

== Career ==
Blumenthal is professor of obstetrics and gynecology at Stanford University School of Medicine. He is the chief of the Stanford Gynecology Service and directors of the Division of Family Planning Services and Research at Stanford. Blumenthal founded and directs SPIRES, the Stanford Program for International Reproductive Education and Services. SPIRES provides quality assurance evaluation services and training to family planning focused NGOs and programs around the globe. For over 30 years, Blumenthal has been an advisor to several domestic and international agencies, such as Gynuity Health Projects, Ipas, Pathfinder, Family Health International 360, Path, JHPIEGO Corporation, Planned Parenthood, and the World Health Organization, and served as the Special Advisor to Ministry of Health and Family Planning of the Republic of Madagascar. He is the Global Medical Director for Population Services International.

As global medical director at Population Services International (PSI), Blumenthal is responsible for overseeing PSI's quality assurance activities, specific to sexual and reproductive health. He is the inventor of the dedicated post-partum intrauterine device (PPIUD) inserter, developed in partnership with PSI.

Blumenthal also teaches a course called Perspectives on the Abortion Experience in Western Fiction to undergraduate students at Stanford University.

=== Early career timeline ===
- 1983–1984, Adjunct Assistant Professor; Department of Obstetrics and Gynecology, Division of Women's Health, UCLA, Los Angeles, California
- 1984–1988, Assistant Professor; Department of Obstetrics and Gynecology, University of Chicago, Pritzker School of Medicine, Chicago, Illinois
- 1988–1990, Visiting Lecturer; Department of Obstetrics and Gynaecology, Kenyatta National Hospital, University of Nairobi, Nairobi, Kenya
- 1990–1995, Associate Professor; Department of Obstetrics and Gynecology, The Johns Hopkins University, Baltimore, Maryland
- 1995–2007, Director; Fellowship of Family Planning, Department of Obstetrics and Gynecology, The Johns Hopkins University, Baltimore, Maryland
- 1995- , Associate; Population Center, Johns Hopkins University, School of Hygiene and Public Health, Baltimore, Maryland
- 2005–2007, Professor; Department of Obstetrics and Gynecology, The Johns Hopkins University, Baltimore, Maryland
- 2005–2006, Visiting professor; Department of Obstetrics and Gynecology, Centre Maternite’ Befeletenana, University of Antananarivo, Antananarivo, Madagascar

== Research ==
Blumenthal's research ranges from cervical cancer screening to contraception access to simplifying abortion in over 20 countries. Thematically, Blumenthal's research aims to increase access to health care for women in low-resource settings and simplifying the medical process.

=== Cervical cancer ===
An author of several peer-reviewed publications on cervical cancer, Blumenthal has significantly contributed to screening and prevention of cancer. Notably, he investigated and implemented a simplified means of screening or detecting cervical cancer in low-resource settings.

=== Contraception ===
Blumenthal has conducted research with many diverse contraceptive methods, most notably, has greatly contributed to long-acting reversible contraception (LARC) literature. He invented a specialized inserter for immediate post-partum intrauterine device (PPIUD) provision. Currently, the dedicated inserter is used in over 10 countries and Blumenthal is working to expand its use in additional countries. Alike his previous research endeavors, the purpose of this inserter is to expand access and simplify methodology.

=== Abortion ===
Specifically, Blumenthal is committed to simplifying the medication abortion process through the development and testing of multilevel pregnancy tests (MLPTs). Additionally, Blumenthal has contributed to a number of research protocols seeking to simplify and improve surgical abortion in the first and second trimester through investigation of different pain control, cervical preparation, and surgical techniques.

== Awards and honors ==
- Rubinstein Scholar in Obstetrics and Gynecology, Chicago Medical School, 1977
- Edward and Teresa Levy Scholarship, Jewish Vocational Service of Chicago, 1975–77
- “Golden Apple” Award for outstanding resident teaching, Michael Reese Hospital and Medical Center, 1987
- Michael Burnhill Award, Association of Reproductive Health Professionals, Planned Parenthood Federation of America, 2007
- Kenneth J. Ryan, MD Physician Leadership Award, Physician for Reproductive Choice and Health, American College of Obstetricians and Gynecologists, Annual Clinical Meeting, 2008
- Best Faculty Teacher in Gynecology, Department of Obstetrics and Gynecology, Stanford University School of Medicine, 2008
- Rothstein Visiting professor, Department of Obstetrics and Gynecology, Washington University School of Medicine, St. Louis, MO, 2009
- Roland Crohn Visiting professor, Department of Obstetrics and Gynecology, Medical College of Wisconsin, Milwaukee, WI, 2010
- Best Faculty Teacher in Gynecology, Department of Obstetrics and Gynecology, Stanford University School of Medicine, 2011
- APGO-CREOG Award for Teaching Excellence, Department of Obstetrics and Gynecology, Stanford University School of Medicine, 2013
- Allan Rosenfield Award for Lifetime Achievement in International Family Planning, Society for Family Planning, 2013
- John S. Long 40th Annual Visiting Professor and Lecturer, Rush University Medical Center, Chicago, USA, 2015
