= New Symphony Orchestra =

New Symphony Orchestra may refer to

- New Symphony Orchestra (London) – British ensemble founded in 1905 and later called the Royal Albert Hall Orchestra
- New Symphony Orchestra (Sofia) – Bulgarian ensemble founded in 1991
- NHK Symphony Orchestra – Japanese ensemble founded in 1926 as the New Symphony Orchestra and renamed in 1951
- An ad hoc recording ensemble also called the New Symphony Orchestra (sometimes the New Symphony Orchestra of London) which played on more than 150 Decca studio recordings between 1948 and 1964.
- New Symphony Orchestra (New York) - short-lived orchestra founded, lead and soon abandoned by Edgard Varèse in 1919
