= Lundeen =

Lundeen is a surname. Notable people with the surname include:

- Bob Lundeen (born 1952), American ice hockey player
- Ernest Lundeen (1878–1940), American lawyer and politician
- Evelyn Lundeen (1900–1963), American nurse
- Paul Lundeen, American politician
