= Salvator Rosa (opera) =

Opera by Antônio Carlos Gomes

- Opera seria by Antônio Carlos Gomes
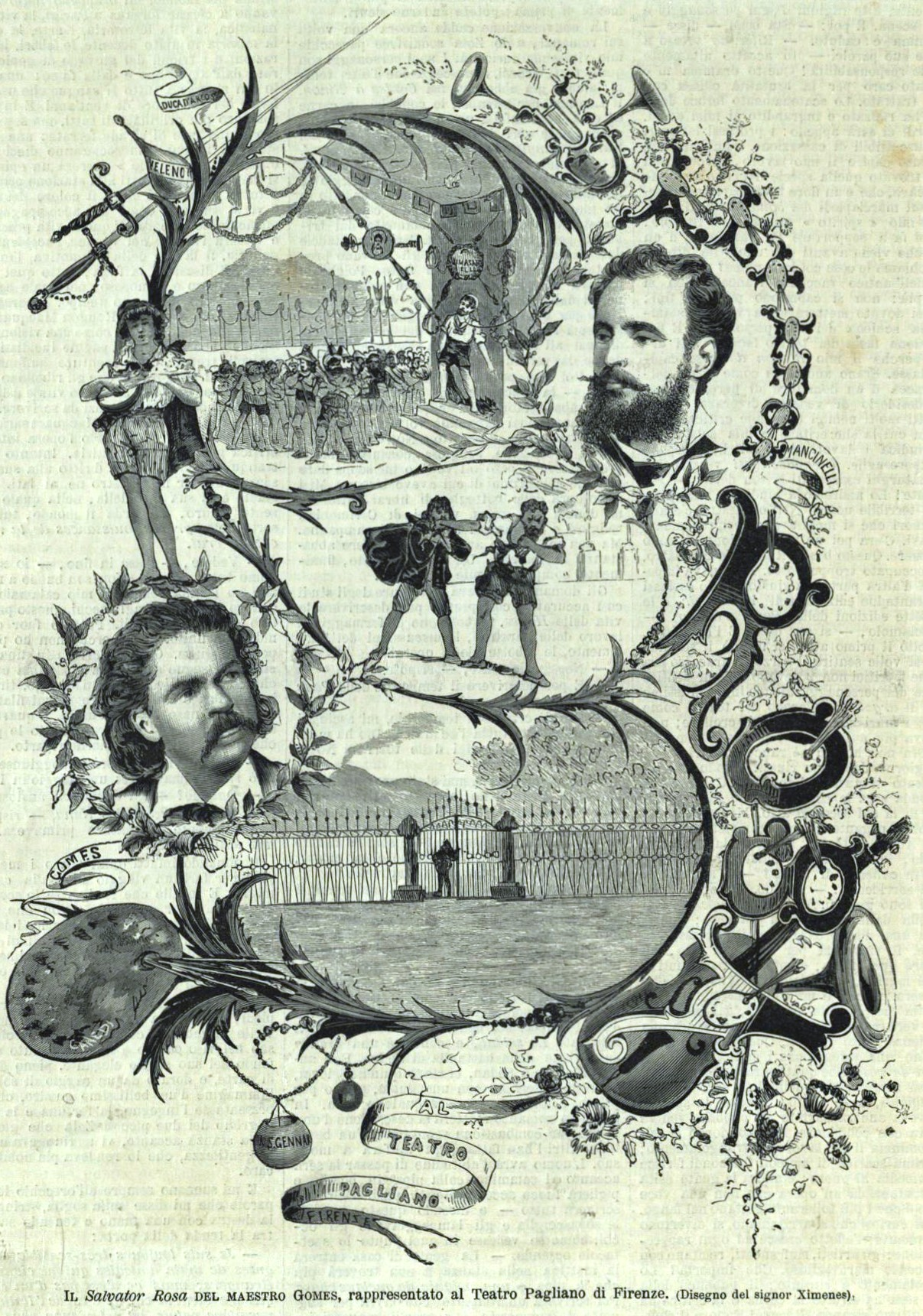
- Salvator Rosa, performed at the Teatro Pagliano in Florence (1878)
- Librettist: Antonio Ghislanzoni
- Language: Italian
- Based on: Eugène de Mirecourt's Masaniello
- Premiere: 21 March 1874; Teatro Carlo Felice, Genoa

Salvator Rosa is an opera seria in four acts composed by Antônio Carlos Gomes to a libretto in Italian by Antonio Ghislanzoni. It premiered at the Teatro Carlo Felice in Genoa on 21 March 1874. The plot is based on Eugène de Mirecourt's 1851 adventure novel, Masaniello, in turn loosely based on the lives of the Italian painter and poet, Salvator Rosa and Masaniello, a Neapolitan fisherman, who became leader of the 1647 revolt against the Spanish Habsburg rule in Naples.

== Background and performance history ==
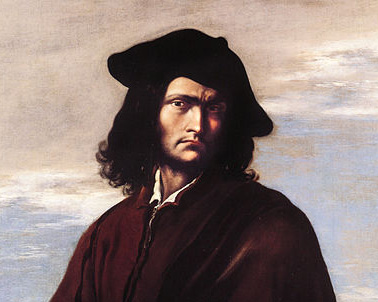
Salvator Rosa (self-portrait circa 1645)

Salvator Rosa was Gomes' fifth opera and the third to have its world premiere in Italy. He and his librettist, Ghislanzoni, had originally wanted to call the opera Masaniello, after Eugène de Mirecourt's novel on which it is based. However, Auber's 1828, La muette de Portici set in the same historical period, was already known in Italy by that name. Instead, Ghislanzoni made Salvator Rosa (a secondary character in de Mirecourt's novel) the chief protagonist. The central love affair between Isabella and Masaniello in the novel became one between Salvator Rosa and Isabella in the opera. Like many fictional works based on the life of Salvator Rosa, de Mirecourt's novel derived from an 1824 biography of the painter by Lady Morgan, The Life and Times of Salvator Rosa, which perpetuated the legends that Rosa had been imprisoned by bandits when he was a young man and that he returned to Naples in 1647 to aid Masaniello in his revolt against Spanish rule. It is the latter legend which forms the basis of Ghislanzoni's libretto.

Salvator Rosa premiered at the Teatro Carlo Felice on 21 March 1874 in a performance conducted by Giovanni Rossi with Guglielmo Anastasi in the title role, Leone Giraldoni as Masaniello, Romilda Pantaleoni as Isabella, and the French bass François-Marcel Junca as her father, the Duke of Arcos. Following the Genoa premiere, the opera was performed in Italy at the Teatro Regio (Turin) (1875), the Teatro Riccardi in Bergamo (1876), and the Teatro Regio (Parma) (1882). In South America, it was first performed in Uruguay at the Teatro Solis in 1876, but it was another six years before the opera was performed in Brazil, Gomes' native country. The Brazilian premiere took place in the city of Belém on 29 July 1882. Although largely forgotten now apart from its great aria for bass, "Di sposo, di padre", the opera's rare 20th century revivals include those in Rio de Janeiro at the Theatro Municipal in 1946 (attended by Gomes' daughter and broadcast on Brazilian radio), São Paulo at the Theatro Municipal in 1977, and at New York City's Amato Opera in 1987. The opera was revived again in 2000 by the Dorset Opera (its UK premiere) with Fernando del Valle in the title role, and 2004 at the Festival della Valle d'Itria in Martina Franca.

== Roles ==
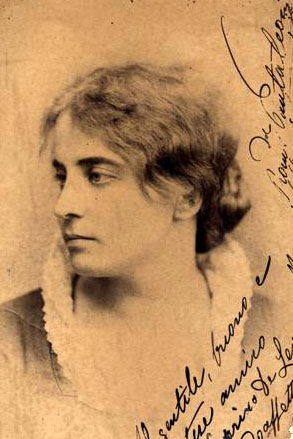
Romilda Pantaleoni who created the role of Isabella

Roles, voice types, premier cast
Role	Voice type	Premiere cast, 21 March 1874
Il duca d'Arcos, Viceroy of Naples	bass	François-Marcel Junca
Isabella, his daughter	soprano	Romilda Pantaleoni
Salvator Rosa, a painter in love with Isabella	tenor	Guglielmo Anastasi
Masaniello, rebel leader and friend of Rosa	baritone	Leone Giraldoni
Gennariello, a young friend of Rosa and Masaniello	soprano (en travesti)	Clelia Blenio
Fernandez, commander of the Spanish troops	tenor	Giacomo Origo
Il conte di Badajoz, a Spanish nobleman	tenor	Carlo Casarini
Corcelli, a brigand allied to the Spanish rulers	bass	Emanuele Dall'Aglio
Bianca, a Spanish lady	mezzo-soprano	Antonietta Pozzoni-Anastasi
Suora Ines, a nun	soprano	Clelia Cappelli
Fra Lorenzo, a monk	bass	Luigi Torre

== Recordings ==
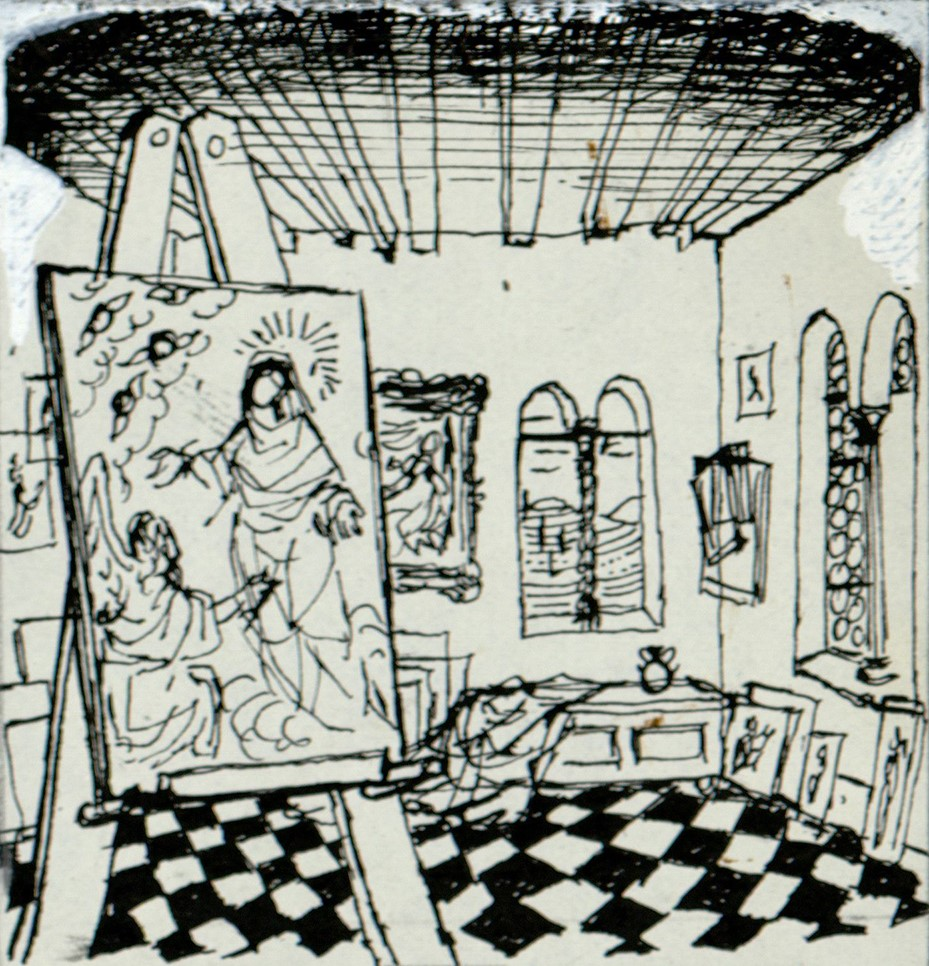
Disegno per copertina di libretto, drawing for Salvator Rosa (undated).

- "Mia piccirella", aria from Salvator Rosa, sung by Enrico Caruso and recorded in 1919. Label: Victor
- Gomes: Salvator Rosa – Michail Milanov (Il Duca d'Arcos), Lisa Livingston (Isabella), Fernando del Valle (Salvator Rosa), Michael Gluecksmann (Masaniello); Dorset Opera Orchestra and Chorus; Patrick Shelley, conductor. Recorded from live performances at Sherborne School, Dorset, England, August 11 and 12, 2000. Label: Regis Records
- Gomes: Salvator Rosa – Francesco Ellero D’Artegna (Il Duca d'Arcos), Francesca Scaini (Isabella), Mauro Pagano (Salvator Rosa), Gianfranco Cappelluti (Masaniello); Italian International Orchestra; Bratislava Chamber Chorus; Maurizio Benini, conductor. Recorded live at the Ducal Palace, Martina Franca, Italy, July 2004. Label: Dynamic
- Gomes: Salvator Rosa – Dae-Bum Lee (Il Duca d'Arcos), Maria Porubcinova (Isabella), Ray M. Wade Jr. (Salvator Rosa), Malte Roesner (Masaniello); Staatsorchester Braunschweig; Braunschweig State Theatre Chorus; Georg Menskes, conductor. Recorded live at the Staatstheater Braunschweig, Germany on January 20, 2010. Label: Oehms Classics in co-production with NDR Kultur and the Braunschweig State Theatre
