= Evelyn Lundeen =

American nurse (1900–1963)

- Born: February 15, 1900; Rockford, Illinois
- Died: January 29, 1963 (aged 62); Chicago, Illinois
- Medical career
- Profession: Nursing
- Field: Neonatal nursing
- Institutions: Michael Reese Hospital
- Sub-specialties: Prematurity

Evelyn Lundeen (February 15, 1900 – January 29, 1963) was an American nurse who headed the first premature nursery in the United States with Dr. Julius Hess. Outside of her work at the nursery, Lundeen traveled to other cities to teach the principles of nursing care for premature infants. With Hess, she also co-authored an early textbook on premature baby care.

== Biography ==
=== Early life ===
Lundeen was born in Rockford, Illinois on February 15, 1900. She graduated from Augustana College in Rock Island, Illinois. She then completed nursing school at Lutheran Hospital in Moline, Illinois, and she worked at the hospital after graduation. Early in her career, Lundeen read a paper at the annual meeting of the Illinois State Association of Graduate Nurses in which she suggested that private duty nurses were too educated to accept cases involving incurable patients; the paper was subsequently published in the American Journal of Nursing.

=== Career ===
Hess had established the first American premature nursery at the Sarah Morris Children's Hospital within Chicago's Michael Reese Hospital in 1922. In 1924, he hired Lundeen to head the nursery. Hess and Lundeen focused on three goals in the care of preterm infants: maintaining body temperature, avoiding infection and providing nutrition. The pair advocated for breast milk as the optimal nutrition source for the preterm baby. In their attempts to prevent infection, staff in premature nurseries of the time wore gowns, masks and caps, and they even excluded parents from visitation. Feedings were given by eyedropper.

By 1940, Lundeen had overseen the nursing care of more than 4,000 infants. As premature nurseries began to appear in other cities, she traveled extensively to teach other nurses about the care of preterm babies. Historians credit Lundeen with shaping the role of nurses in neonatal care. According to American Nursing: A Biographical Dictionary, Volume 3, "because premature infants required such constant and labor-intensive care, neonatal nursing, as devised by Lundeen, became one of the rare places in a hospital where all medical personnel deemed nurses at least as important as doctors, if not more so."

Jeffrey P. Baker wrote that Lundeen was "a tireless worker who oversaw every aspect of the nursery, developing standards of care and detailed protocols addressing virtually any situation that might arise. Under her direction, nurses assumed practical control of the nursery, often provoking resentment from younger physicians who sought to work with Hess."

=== Later life ===
Lundeen worked at Michael Reese for 38 years, retiring in 1962. She died on June 29, 1963. Lundeen had suffered from a chronic heart-related illness.

=== Recognition ===
Lundeen was posthumously inducted into the Neonatal Nursing Hall of Fame in 2019.

== Works ==
=== Books ===
- Premature and Congenitally Diseased Infants (multiple editions, with Hess)
- Care of the Premature Infant (1958, with Ralph Kunstadter)

=== Articles ===
- "Feeding the premature baby." (1939). American Journal of Nursing, 39, 596-604.
- "Safe hospital care of the premature baby." (1940). Hospitals, 14, 110-115.
- "Newer trends in the care of premature infants." (1959). Nursing World, 133, 9-11.
