= Romilda Pantaleoni =

Italian soprano

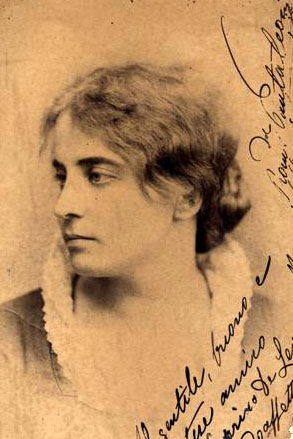
Romilda Pantaleoni circa 1875

Romilda Pantaleoni (1847 – 20 May 1917) was an Italian dramatic soprano who had a prolific opera career in Italy during the 1870s and 1880s. She sang a wide repertoire that encompassed bel canto roles, Italian and French grand opera, verismo operas, and the German operas of Richard Wagner. She became particularly associated with the roles of Margherita in Boito's Mefistofele and the title role in Ponchielli's La Gioconda; two roles which she performed in opera houses throughout Italy. She is best remembered today for originating the roles of Desdemona in Giuseppe Verdi's Otello (1887) and Tigrana in Giacomo Puccini's Edgar (1889). Universally admired for her acting skills as well as her singing abilities, Pantaleoni was compared by several critics to the great Italian stage actress Eleonora Duse.

== Biography ==
Pantaleoni was born into a musical family in Udine, Italy. Her father, Luigi Pantaleoni (?–1872), was a composer and her brother, Adriano Pantaleoni (1837–1908), also became a successful opera singer. She studied singing in Milan under R. Rossi, B. Prati, and Francesco Lamperti before making her professional opera début at the Teatro Carcano in Jacopo Foroni's Margherita in 1868. She appeared in operas throughout Italy over the next fifteen years, including performances in Rome, Genoa, Modena, Naples, Turin, and Brescia. Her repertoire included such roles as Mathilde in Rossini's Guillaume Tell, Paolina in Donizetti's Poliuto, Sélika in Meyerbeer's L'Africaine, Marguerite in Gounod's Faust, and Elsa in Wagner's Lohengrin. She also was known for her portrayals of Verdi heroines including: Leonora in both Il trovatore and La forza del destino, Amelia in Un ballo in maschera, Elisabeth de Valois in Don Carlos and the title role in Aida.

In 1874 Pantaleoni sang the role of Isabella in the world premiere of Antônio Carlos Gomes' Salvator Rosa at the Teatro Carlo Felice in Genoa. The following year she sang the role of Margherita in Boito's Mefistofele at the Teatro Regio di Torino. Her performance was greatly admired and is considered by music historians to be one of the reasons that Boito's opera enjoyed a renewed popularity after its less than enthusiastic reception in 1868. In 1884 she appeared in several opera with the Vienna State Opera, the only time that she performed outside of Italy.

Pantaleoni joined the roster at La Scala in 1883, making her debut in the title role of La Gioconda. She performed numerous roles at La Scala over the next eight years including Valentine in Meyerbeer's Les Huguenots (1884), Anna in Puccini's Le villi (1885), the title role in the world premiere of Amilcare Ponchielli's Marion Delorme (1885), Desdemona in the first performance of Verdi's Otello (1887), and Tigrana in the world premiere of Puccini's Edgar (1889) among others. She retired from the stage in 1891 after the death of conductor Franco Faccio, who was her longtime lover. Her last performance was as Santuzza in La Scala's first production of Mascagni's Cavalleria rusticana. She died in Milan.
