= Arnold Azrikan =

Russian opera singer (1906–1976)

Arnold Grigorevich Azrikan (Russian: Арнольд Григорьевич Азрикан; Ukrainian: Арнольд Григорович Азрікан; February 23, 1906 – July 19, 1976) was a Soviet operatic dramatic tenor.

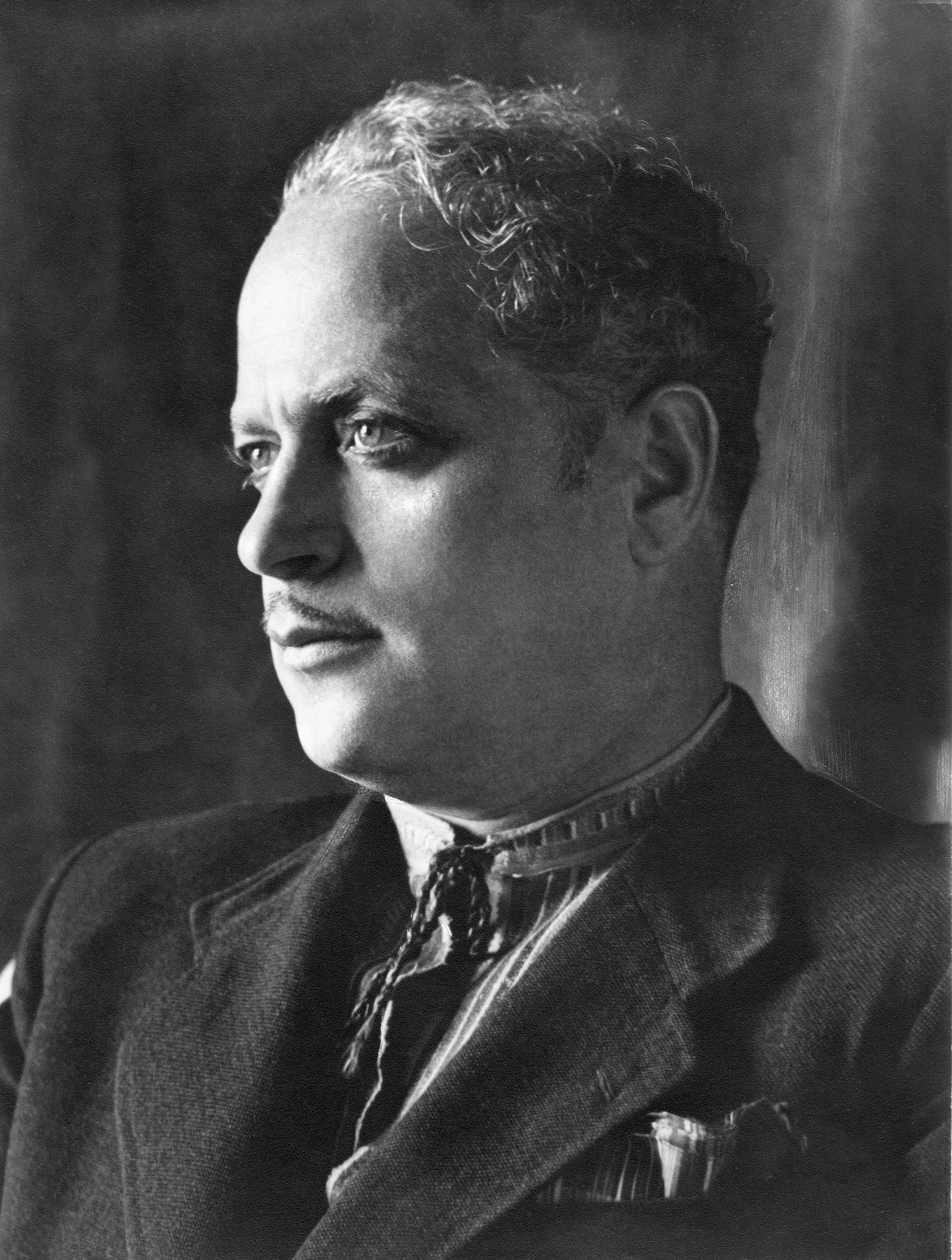
Arnold Azrikan (1906-1976). Russian and Ukrainian opera singer

== Biography and career ==
He began to sing at the age of twelve in a chorus of the city church in Odessa. Between 1926 and 1929, he studied at the Odessa Conservatory where he was coached by the singers Menner-Kanevskaya and Julia Reider. Later, in Kharkov, he had further studies with the Spanish tenor and voice teacher Carlo Barrera. He began first as a chorister at the Odessa Opera Theater in 1926, and in 1928 he made his debut there as Nathanael in Offenbach's The Tales of Hoffmann.

In 1930, he was invited to the opera theater in Kharkov (the capital of Ukraine at that time) where he sang in the Ukrainian, Russian and Italian repertoires. In 1934 both the capital and the opera's leading soloists, including Azrikan, moved to Kyiv.

In 1939, Azrikan first sang the title role in Giuseppe Verdi's Otello which later became his signature role. He was awarded the title of Honored Artist of Ukraine in 1940, and along with his friendly rival Yuri Kiporenko-Domansky, Azrikan was the leading tenor at the Kyiv Opera and Ballet Theatre until 1943. He sang vocal parts in the film “Vozdushnyi Izvozchik” [Taxi to Heaven] filmed in 1943 by Lenfilm in Alma-Ata. He toured the same year in Novosibirsk and soon he joined the Yekaterinburg (then called Sverdlovsk) Opera Theatre where he achieved his greatest recognition as a dramatic tenor in Otello. For this performance he was awarded the Stalin Prize in 1946. He remained with this theatre until 1951. Later, he toured extensively all over the Soviet Union while having long time engagements with the Odessa Opera and Ballet Theatre and the Baku Opera and Ballet Theatre. He retired from stage in 1964 during his engagement with the Moldova Opera Theatre but returned to the same theater for his farewell performance in Otello in 1968. He taught singing at the Chișinău Conservatory.

Azrikan was also the stage director of several opera productions in which he also sang the leading roles. After his retirement from stage, he taught singing at the Chișinău Conservatory. He died in 1976 in Moscow.

== Repertoire ==
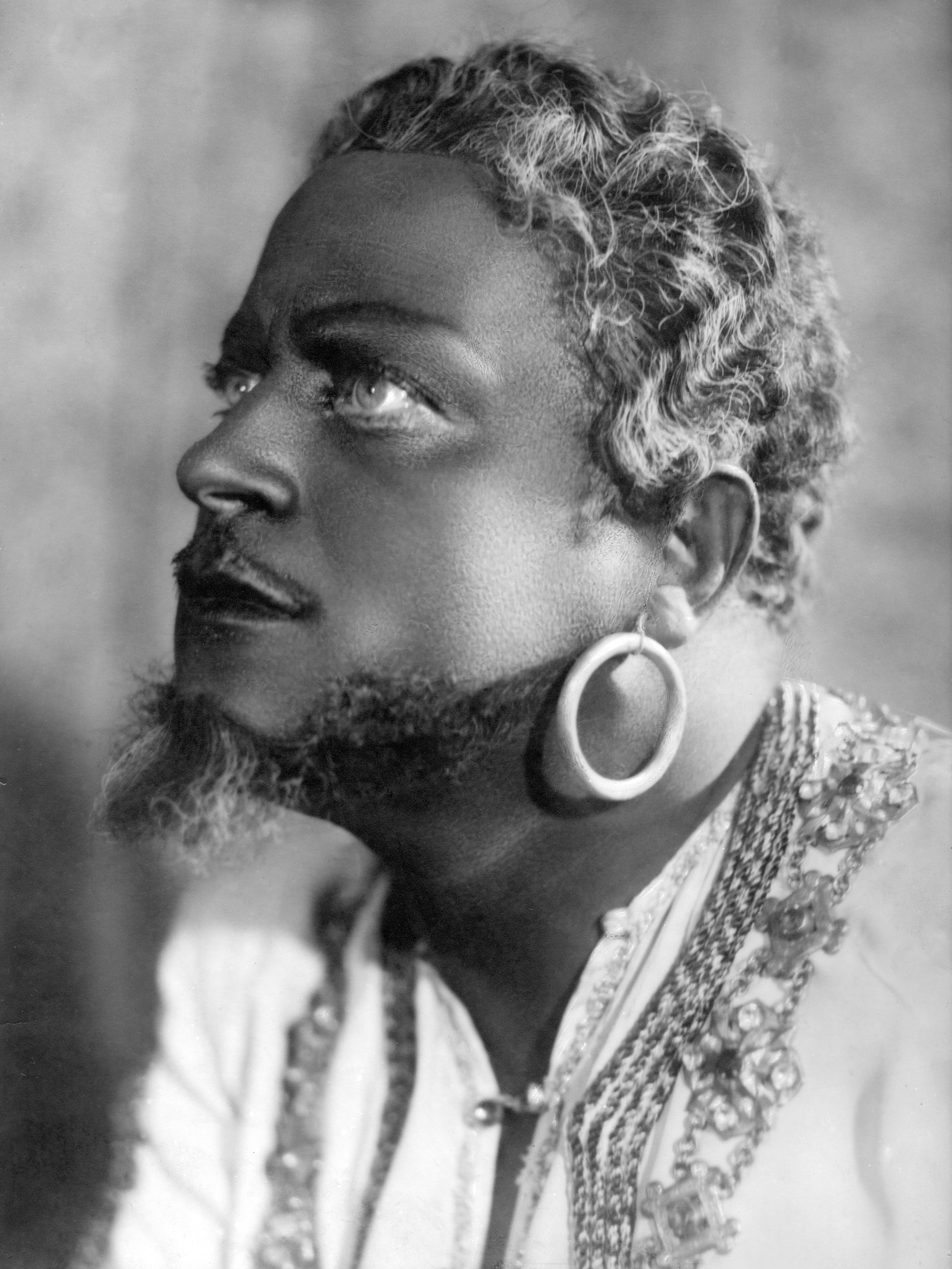
Russian tenor Arnold Azrikan in Verdi's Otello. Sverdlovsk (Ekaterinburg) State Academic Opera and Ballet Theater

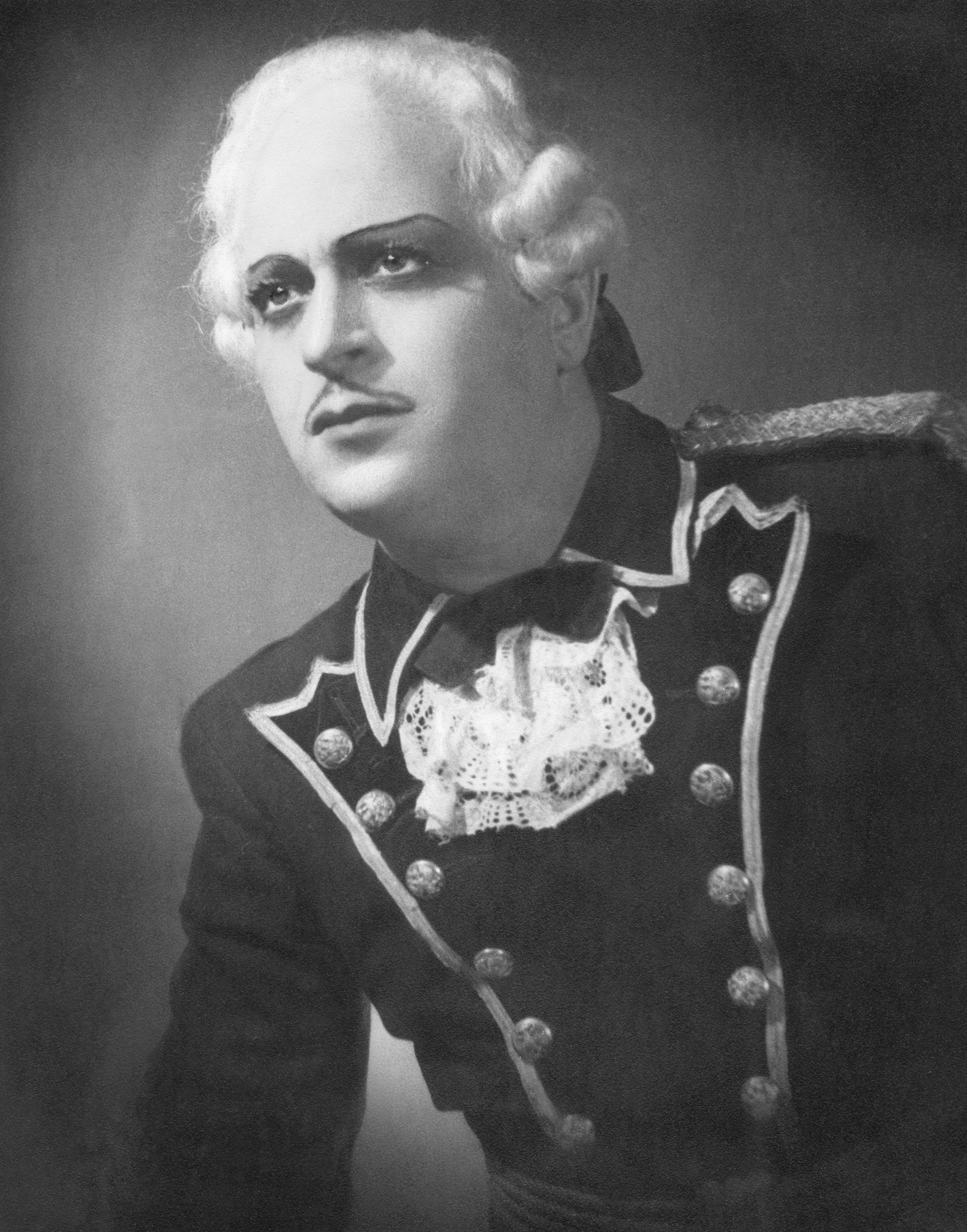
Arnold Azrikan as Herman in Tchaikovsky's The Queen of Spades

- Vladimir Igorevich (Prince Igor by Borodin)
- Vladimir (Dubrovsky by Nápravník)
- Sobinin (A Life for the Tsar by Glinka)
- Pretender (Boris Godunov by Mussorgsky)
- Andrei (Mazeppa by Tchaikovsky)
- Vakula (Cherevichki by Tchaikovsky)
- Sadko (Sadko by Rimsky-Korsakov)
- Hermann (The Queen of Spades by Tchaikovsky)
- Lyonka (Into the storm by Khrennikov)
- Godun (Razlom by Vladimir Femelidi)
- Grigory (Quiet Flows the Don by Dzerzhinsky)
- Andrei (Taras Bulba by Lysenko)
- Andrei (Zaporozhets za Dunayem by Hulak-Artemovsky)
- Petro (Natalka Poltavka by Lysenko)
- Iontek (Halka by Moniuszko)
- Nathanael (The Tales of Hoffmann by Offenbach)
- Raul (Les Huguenots by Meyerbeer)
- Faust (Faust by Gounod)
- Calaf (Turandot by Puccini)
- Radames (Aida by Verdi)
- Manrico (Il trovatore by Verdi)
- Canio (Pagliacci by Leoncavallo)
- Arrigo (The Sicilian Vespers by Verdi)
- Cavaradossi (Tosca by Puccini)
- Don Jose (Carmen by Bizet)
- Pinkerton (Madame Butterfly by Puccini)
- Turiddu (Cavalleria rusticana by Mascagni)
- Des Grieux (Manon Lescaut by Puccini)
- Otello (Otello by Verdi)

== Stage director ==
- Otello by Verdi (Kuibyshev Opera and Ballet Theater, 1950; Saratov Opera and Ballet Theater, 1951; Baku Opera and Ballet Theater, 1952; Chisinau Opera and Ballet Theater, 1964)
- Iolanta by Tchaikovsky (Baku Opera and Ballet Theater, 1953)
- Manon Lescaut by Puccini (Baku Opera and Ballet Theater, 1956)

== Discography ==
Two Ukrainian romances - Arnold Azrikan - Gramplast, No.5230/5232, 1937.

== Awards ==
- Deserved Artist of Ukraine, 1940
- Stalin Prize, 1946 (renamed as the USSR State Prize in 1954)

== Sources ==
English

- Azrikan, Dina and Dmitry. Arnold Azrikan: Romance for a Dramatic Tenor. Highland Park, Illinois: Azrikan. 2006. 256. ISBN 978-0-615-13263-1 (also in Russian)
- Azrikan, Dina. Arnold Azrikan, part II: Curtain Call. Highland Park, Illinois: Azrikan. 2012. 110. ISBN 978-0-615-50775-0 (also in Russian)

Russian

- Agin, M.S. Vokalno-entsiklopedichskii slovar [Encyclopedic Dictionary of Vocalists], Moscow, 1991. 15
- Azrikan, Dina and Azrikan, Dmitry. Arnold Azrikan: romans dlia dramaticheskogo tenora. Highland Park, Illinois. 2006. 256. ISBN 978-0-615-13263-1 (also in English).
- Azrikan, Dina. Arnold Azrikan, chast II: vozvrashchenie na avanstsenu. Highland Park, Illinois. 2012. 110. ISBN 978-0-615-50775-0 (also in English).
- Belza, I. (April 17, 1946)."Otello" v Sverdlovskom opernom teatre ["Otello" at the Sverdlovsk Opera Theater], Izvestia.
- Demianenko, S. (July 31, 1946). "Glazami rezhissera" [By the director's eye], Teatr i zritel.
- Ebergardt, S., Porska V. Nash opernyi [Our opera theater], Yekaterinburg: Uralskoe literaturnoe agentstvo, 1998. 73-75, 128.
- Maksimenko, V.S. Dva veka odesskogo Gorodskogo teatra [Two Centuries of the Odessa Civic Theater], Odessa: Astroprint, 2005. 248. ISBN 978-966-318-261-2
- Maksimenko, V.S.Gorodskoi teatr Odessy: 1809-2009 [The Odessa Civic Theater: 1809-2009], Odessa: Astroprint, 2010. 177-179. ISBN 978-966-19-0260-1
- Matafonova, Y. (April 27, 2007). "Vertinskii pisal o nem tak…" [Vertinsky wrote about him these words…], Uralskii rabochii [The Urals Worker].
- Pozhar, S. "Luchshii Otello" (Best Otello), "Moldova" 5-6 (2007): 19-21.
- Vertinskaia, Lidiia. Siniaia ptitsa liubvi [Blue bird of love], Moskva: Vagrius, 2004. 168. ISBN 978-5-475-00006-9
- Deviatova, O.L. Zhivaia zhizn teatra [Live life of the theater], Ekaterinburg: Avtograf, 2012. 193-196. ISBN 978-5-98955-109-5
- Matafonova, Y. Golosa iz XX veka (Voices from the XX century), Ekaterinburg: Sokrat, 2014. 83-87. ISBN 978-5-906350-24-4

Ukrainian

- Entsyklopediia sychasnoi Ukrainy [Contemporary Ukrainian encyclopedia], Kyiv: NAU, 2001. T.1. 229. ISBN 978-966-02-2075-1
- Lysenko, Ivan. Slovnyk spivakiv Ukrainy [Dictionary of the Ukrainian singers], Kyiv: Rada, 1997. 10. ISBN 978-966-7087-11-1
- Lysenko, Ivan. Ukrainski spivaky u spohadakh suchasnykiv [Ukrainian singers in the memoirs of their contemporaries], Kyiv: Rada, 2003, 531. ISBN 978-966-7087-51-7
- Myttsi Ukrainy: entsyklopedychnyi dovidnyk [Muses of Ukraine: encyclopedia], Kyiv: Ukrainska entsyklopediia, 1992. 16.

Czech

- Petišková, Dagmar. Návrat "zapomenutého" jména: příběh Arnolda Azrikana. Knihovna [online]. 2013, roč. 24, č. 1, s. 79-88 [cit. 2013-10-17].

Romanian

- Eskenasy, Victor (21—27 April 2007). «Arnold Azrikan — Tenorul de neuitat». Suplimentul de Cultura 124, p. 12
- Eskenasy, Victor (18—24 Feb. 2012). "Arnold Azrikan - Chemare la rampă" ("Arnold Azrikan - Curtain Call). Radio Free Europe (in Romanian)
