= Julius Hess =

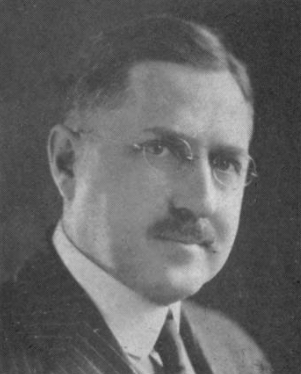
- Born: January 26, 1876; Ottawa, Illinois, US
- Died: November 2, 1955 (aged 79); Los Angeles, California, US
- Education: Northwestern University Medical School
- Spouse: Clara E. Merrifield (m. 1902)
- Medical career
- Profession: Medicine
- Field: Pediatrics
- Institutions: Rush Medical College; Northwestern University Medical School; University of Illinois College of Medicine
- Sub-specialties: Neonatology
- Research: Prematurity

Julius H. Hess (January 26, 1876 – November 2, 1955) was an American physician who is often considered the father of American neonatology. In 1922, he published the first textbook focused on the care of prematurity and birth defects in infants. That same year, Hess and nurse Evelyn Lundeen created the first premature infant station in the United States, recognizing the importance of nursing care and temperature management in the care of preterm babies. Hess also made early contributions to the transport of such infants to specialty centers.

== Biography ==
=== Early life ===
Hess was born on January 26, 1876, in Ottawa, Illinois. He graduated from Northwestern University Medical School, remained in Chicago for an internship, then went to Johns Hopkins University for more training. He married Clara E. Merrifield on April 15, 1902, and they had two children.

=== Career ===
Working at Michael Reese Hospital, Hess created a form of infant incubator in 1914, then invented an incubator designed for the transport of infants in 1922. By 1934, the Hess incubator was also capable of oxygen administration. Hess created the first premature infant nursery, where he worked with nurse Evelyn Lundeen to optimize care for preterm infants. Around that time, pediatricians had just become involved in the delivery room and nursery care of newborns. Hess and Lundeen focused on providing minimal stimulation and managing the temperature of premature babies. Hess was a member of the Jewish Children's Bureau in Chicago.

=== Later life ===
Hess remained in practice as a physician until his death. He died suddenly while visiting his daughter in Los Angeles on November 2, 1955.

== Works ==
- Principles and Practice of Infant Feeding (1919)
- Premature and Congenitally Diseased Infants (1922)
- Infant Feeding: A Handbook for the Practitioner (1923)
- The Premature Infant: Its Medical and Nursing Care (1941, with Lundeen)
