= Mila Kupfer-Berger =

Austrian singer

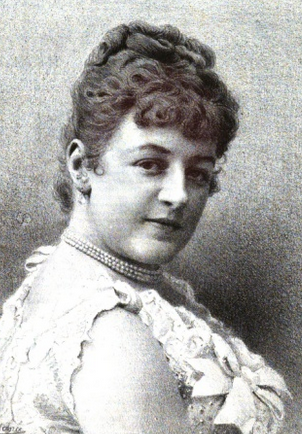
- Mila Kupfer-Berger, from an 1888 publication
- Born: Ludmilla Berger; 6 September 1852; Vienna
- Died: 12 May 1905; Neuwaldegg
- Occupation(s): Singer, voice teacher

Ludmilla "Mila" Kupfer-Berger (6 September 1852 – 12 May 1905) was an Austrian dramatic soprano and voice teacher.

== Early life ==
Ludmilla Berger was born in Vienna; her father was a manufacturer, and she trained in music from childhood, including piano, violin, and voice lessons in Vienna, under teachers including Adele Passy-Cornet.

== Career ==
In 1871, Berger made her opera stage debut in Linz, as Marguerite in Gounod's Faust. She sang at the Berlin Court Opera for four years, from 1871 to 1875. She sang with the Vienna Court Opera from 1875 to 1885, including as Micäela in the first Viennese performance of Carmen in 1875. Her other roles included Aida (1883-1885), Fricka, Freia, and Siegelinde in The Ring Cycle (1878-1885), and Pamina in The Magic Flute (1876-1884). Angelo Neumann recalled Berger as "one of the most beautiful creatures" who ever played Elsa von Brabant in Lohengrin (1875-1885).

Berger performed in most of the major opera houses in Europe, and toured in South America. In 1887, she sang the title role in Aida in London's Drury Lane; a reviewer commented that "Signora Mila Kupfer-Berger was not the girlish Aida to which we have become accustomed; but she threw all her energies into the part, and was warmly applauded." During the same London stay, however, her performance as Elsa in Lohengrin was criticized: "her music would have been far more satisfactory without the eternal vibrato", noted The Era. In her later years she retired from the stage but continued performing in recitals and teaching voice students. She was a popular subject of portrait artists and her image appeared often in periodicals.

== Personal life ==
Mila Berger married Ernst Kupfer, a Viennese businessman. She died in 1905, aged 52 years, in Neuwaldegg.
