= Michael Reese Hospital =

Former hospital in Chicago, Illinois

Michael Reese Hospital and Medical Center
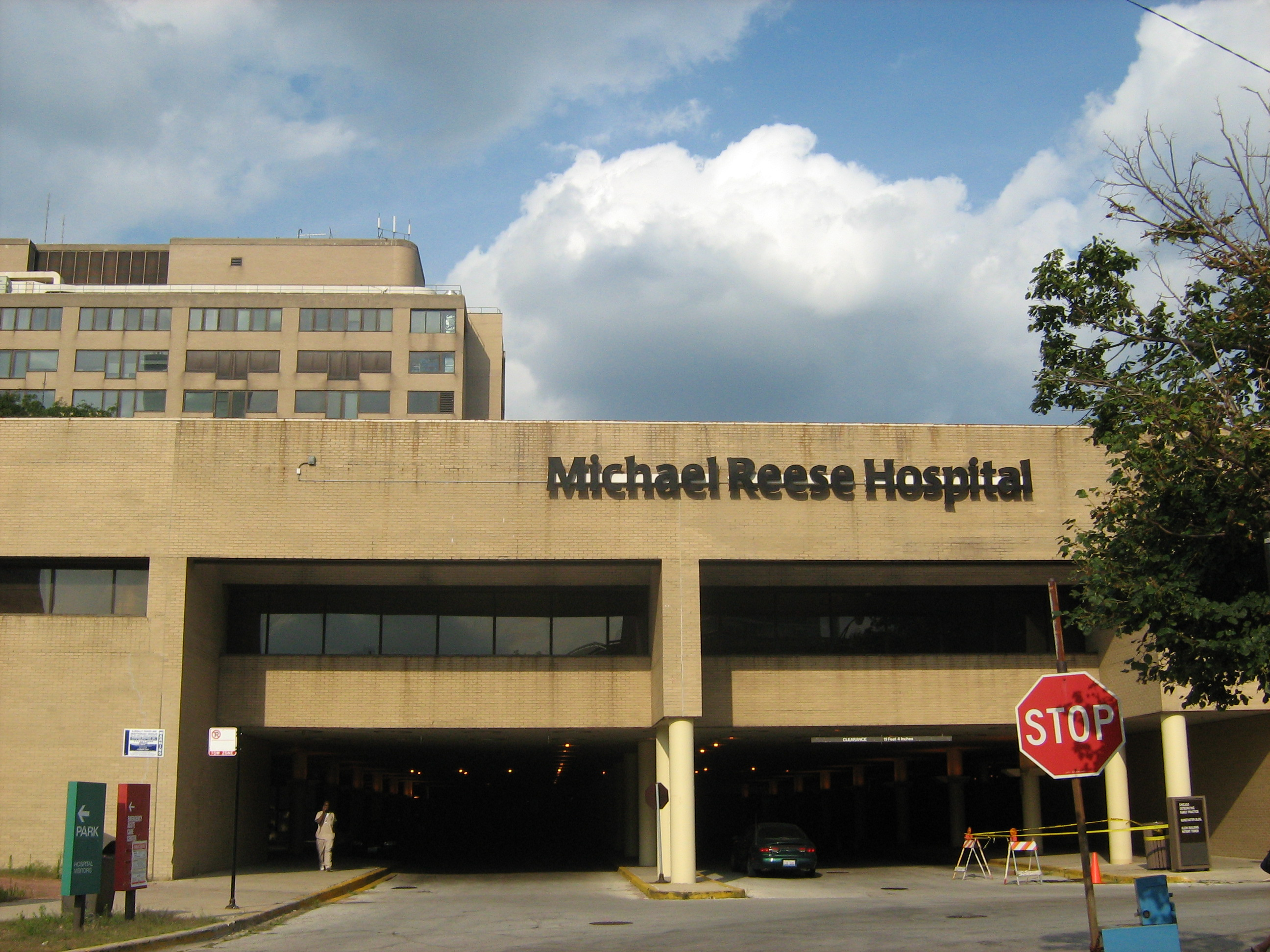
- 2008 photograph of Michael Reese Hospital underpass entrance view from 29th Street.

Geography
- Location: 2929 S. Ellis Avenue; Bronzeville, Chicago, Illinois, 60616, United States
- Coordinates: 41.84138°N 87.61356°W

Organization
- Type: Community; Teaching

Services
- Beds: 1,008 (1991)

History
- Founded: 1881
- Closed: August 31, 2009
- Demolished: October 2009–2013

Links
- Lists: Hospitals in the United States

Michael Reese Hospital and Medical Center was a hospital in the Bronzeville neighborhood of Chicago, Illinois, United States. Founded in 1881, Michael Reese Hospital was a major research and teaching hospital and one of the oldest and largest hospitals in Chicago. It was located at 2929 S. Ellis Avenue on the near south side of Chicago, next to Lake Shore Drive (U.S. Route 41) which lies along Lake Michigan. The hospital closed its Internal Medicine Residency at the end of the 2007–2008 academic year and finished transferring patients to Mercy Hospital and Medical Center before the end of 2008. The 48-acre campus was then vacated by January 2009. From 2007 to its closing, Michael Reese had been owned by Envision Hospital Corporation of Scottsdale, Arizona. The hospital officially closed August 31, 2009.

At one time, the hospital had a large health plan which included 300,000 patients; at the time of the hospital's closure the health plan was terminated and it only had 2,900 clients. The streets through the campus were closed and demolition began in October 2009.

== History ==
Michael Reese was a real estate developer who died August 1, 1878, leaving funds in his will to build a new hospital. Reese's heirs requested that the hospital would be open to all people, regardless of creed, nationality, or race. Construction of the first hospital on the corner of 29th and Groveland Avenue was completed in 1880. In its early years, it served a diverse array of mostly European immigrants; by the time the hospital was shuttered in 2009, it primarily served the black community. For much of its history, Michael Reese was dedicated to charity care as well as medical research and education. In 1890, the hospital established a training school for nurses in order to ensure a steady supply of nursing staff. In 1899, the hospital became famous as the first US institution to implement a motorized ambulance service. The vehicle was electric, running on a 44-cell battery. Similar models used shortly thereafter in New York City had a top speed of 16 miles (26 km) per hour and a range of approximately 25 miles (40 km) before they needed to be recharged.

The original Michael Reese building was demolished in 1905 and replaced in 1907 by another, larger, 1000-bed building on the same site. Leonidas Berry was a pioneer in the development and use of the gastroscope. Dr. Samuel Soskin and Dr. Rachmiel Levine made important discoveries about the "gatekeeper" action in insulin, which is of fundamental importance to the understanding of diabetes. Dr. Albert Milzer and his research team were the first to kill the polio virus and make an effective vaccine against this debilitating virus. The hospital was also the first to have an infant incubator in 1915, and the first permanent incubator station for prematurely born babies 1922, both of which were innovated by Dr. Julius Hess.

As early as the 1940s, the area surrounding Michael Reese Hospital was already in economic and physical decline. The hospital, along with Illinois Institute of Technology (IIT) and Mercy Hospital and Medical Center, was one of the businesses in the area responsible for creating the South Side Planning Board. IIT and Michael Reese opted to try urban renewal instead of abandoning the neighborhood altogether. From 1954 to 1986, Reese purchased adjacent properties, (such as the Conrad Seipp Brewery on 27th Street, which had failed and closed in 1933 as a result of Prohibition). Reese demolished existing structures on those properties, and constructed additional clinics and pavilions on the growing campus. The new buildings housed many specialty clinics, including a tumor center, a Psychosomatic and Psychiatric Institute, a city public health clinic, a nurse's residence and school building, a heart surgery center, the Siegel Institute for Communicative Disorders, and the Simon Wexler outpatient psychiatric facility. At its height, the hospital had 2,400 beds and was the largest hospital in Chicago. At the time of its closure, there were only 150. In 1991, Michael Reese Hospital was acquired by Humana. In March 1993, Humana spun off its hospitals under the name Galen Health Care. In June, Galen merged with Columbia Healthcare. In 1994, Columbia merged with HCA to form Columbia/HCA.

=== Nursing School ===
The Michael Reese Hospital School of Nursing put new students to work assisting in the hospital wards, where they learned working along with hospital physicians. In addition to practical training, students took courses in anatomy, physiology, and medicine. What began as a two-year program was extended to three years in 1895. Many young women came to Michael Reese directly after finishing high school; some had ambitions to go beyond their clinical nursing training to attend college afterward. By the time the school closed in 1981, changes in the nursing profession discouraged diploma nursing programs and emphasized associate degree and bachelor's degrees in nursing, and prospective nurses opted for university-based programs. Before its closure, Michael Reese's nursing school provided both a diploma and an associate degree to its graduates. Over the course of nearly a century, the Michael Reese Hospital School of Nursing graduated 4,160 students.

=== Financial difficulties ===
In 1998, ownership was transferred from Columbia/HCA Healthcare Corporation to what is now known as Envision Hospital Corporation. At this time, the number of beds was reduced from 1,100 to 450 beds, and the hospital began closing clinics and laying off employees. Operating expenses for the aging facilities continued increasing, while the hospital itself operated at a loss for the last several years. Heating and physical plant expenditures were staggeringly high compared to newer and more modern facilities such as Mercy Catholic Hospital and Little Company Of Mary Hospital.

In the face of escalating financial challenges, the hospital abandoned their effort to return to profitability. Many buildings on the campus had fallen into disrepair, and some were already completely unused. In 2004, archived medical records were kept in unsorted piles on wooden pallets, in a gutted clinical research building on the campus. In mid-2007, the number of beds was reduced to 150. By this time, almost all of the clinics had closed and the medical research centers had closed. On June 5, 2008, WLS-TV reported that the hospital filed with the State of Illinois a letter of intent to close by the end of 2008. And on September 28, 2008, the hospital filed for Chapter 11 bankruptcy protection. Healthcare Business News reported on September 29, 2008, that the hospital owed $6.6 million to its landlord (Medline Industries), $4.7 million to gas, electric, and water utilities, $2.3 million to the University of Illinois Medical Center, and more than $860,000 in county and state taxes. When the hospital closed patients were transferred to Mercy Medical Center And Hospital.

== Demolition progress and preservation efforts ==
Portions of the hospital campus were over 100 years old and believed by some preservationists to hold historic value. The older buildings were constructed in an ornate style. The Rothschild Nurses' Residence was built in extensive detail and ornate styling, with molded ceilings, arched double windows, solid hardwood floors, and extensive woodwork throughout. The oldest portion of the main hospital building, which was shuttered in 1997 and soon fell into disrepair, also had significant detail and ornate styling in the auditorium and common areas. Although small-scale preservation efforts were made, both buildings were eventually demolished. A series of newer buildings were completed after a 1946 plan created by Walter Gropius, the first director of the Bauhaus in Germany. These buildings, built from 1946 to 1959, were designed by Chicago firms based in part on the Gropius plan. In addition, the landscaping on the campus was designed by modernist landscape architect Hideo Sasaki, a colleague of Gropius's at the Harvard Graduate School of Design.

Preservation Magazine reported in June 2009 that "according to [Molly] Sullivan in the city's Community Development department, the original 1907 Prairie-style building designed by Schmidt, Garden & Martin will be preserved, but the rest of the 29-building campus is not "feasible to save," she says. "Our intention is to utilize the main Michael Reese building, but everything in addition to that, including the Gropius buildings, needs to be cleared from the area." However, the original hospital building, which had been neglected since 1997 and was in poor condition, was later demolished after repeated break ins and acts of looting and vandalism, and due to lack of interest in redevelopment. Initial demolition began in 2009 and continued through 2010. By 2012, all buildings with the exception of a small former administration building had been cleared from the site. Construction and demolition work was complicated in August 2009 by the discovery of radioactive contamination of soil on the site. A radium separation company had previously operated on site in the early 1900s and was purchased by the hospital to supply radium for medical procedures. The US Environmental Protection Agency has mandated a cleanup of the site to remove contamination.

== Current status ==
The site is currently vacant, with the exception of the Singer Pavilion building (formerly the psychiatric institute), and is fenced off. The site was proposed as the location for the Barack Obama Presidential Library and Museum, but the Obama Foundation ultimately selected Jackson Park (in part due to its proximity to the University of Chicago).

=== 2016 Olympics use plan ===
The Chicago 2016 Olympic organizing committee had advocated a plan to construct the Olympic Village on the Michael Reese site as a reuse project, should Chicago be awarded the Games. The city had originally planned to build an Olympic Village above the truck yards south of McCormick Place, but focused their planning on the Michael Reese campus after the hospital announced its planned closure. Under the new plan, the city would borrow $85 million to buy the Michael Reese Hospital campus from its then owner, Medline Industries. Medline would have received $65 million because the company agreed to make a $20 million charitable contribution back to the city. The city would then have used that $20 million to pay up to five years of interest on its $85 million debt, demolish the hospital, and clean up the 48-acre site. Then sometime in the next couple years it planned to sell the site for at least $85 million to a developer or developers, who in turn would build a complex big enough to house about 15,000 Olympians. After the games the developer would then sell or rent out the units. Instead, demolition and cleanup costs were projected at $32 million and rising; as a result Medline agreed to raise its charitable contribution to $32.5 million. The site was purchased in July 2009 for $86 million after Medline agreed to the changes in the contract. After Rio de Janeiro was selected, the Olympic Village plan was discontinued in favor of large scale residential development.

=== Redevelopment plans ===
On June 2, 2017, it was revealed that plans to redevelop the former property of the Michael Reese Hospital and Medical Center in Chicago are currently underway. On September 27, 2017, a proposal to develop the new headquarters of Amazon at the site was revealed. On July 17, 2019, the site was selected as one of 5 possible locations for a Chicago casino.

The latest plans are for the site to return to use for the health sciences with Israel's Sheba Medical Center saying they will occupy up to 25% of a planned 500,000 sq ft (46,000 m^{2}) medical research and innovation center.

==== Bronzeville Lakefront redevelopment ====
In July 2021, the Chicago City Council approved a $3.8 billion redevelopment project for the former site of Michael Reese Hospital, designed by architecture firm Skidmore, Owings & Merrill (SOM). The project, called Bronzeville Lakefront, will be led by Farpoint Development and encompass approximately 8 million square feet of mixed-use space, including 5,000 residential units and 15 million square feet of office and retail space. The redevelopment will occur in two phases: the $500 million first phase, expected to break ground in 2021, will focus on the ARC Innovation Center, senior housing, park space, retail, and infrastructural improvements. The second phase, estimated at $3 billion, is set to begin in 2025 and will complete the development with a mix of office, retail, and residential buildings. The Bronzeville Lakefront project is part of a larger trend of megadevelopments in Chicago aimed at reshaping the city and revitalizing neighborhoods.
