= New Symphony Orchestra (Sofia) =

Bulgarian orchestra

The New Symphony Orchestra is an orchestra in Bulgaria.

== History ==
The New Symphony Orchestra was founded in 1991 in Sofia, Bulgaria by the music critic Julia Hristova as an alternative to the existing Bulgarian musical institutions (which had been financially supported and controlled by the state until the fall of Communism in 1989). Since its inception, the New Symphony Orchestra has produced a cultural model of its own and has created a Society of Friends, dedicated to the welfare of this cultural institution, which is unique in Bulgaria. The Julia Hristova Concert House, which opened in 1990, serves as a home for the Orchestra. This House had its own unique system of organizing and financing the orchestra and working with its young musicians. According to the words of its founder, Julia Hristova, "We worked not to survive but to create."

From the very beginning, the idea of the New Symphony Orchestra was to be both a school and an institution taking care of young, talented musicians who had no experience on the stages of concert halls, but who had the strong desire to work and perfect themselves. Over eight hundred musicians have played for the Orchestra. (The average age of these musicians is 26.) Graduates of the School of the New Symphony Orchestra are now members of the biggest Bulgarian orchestras and opera houses, and of orchestras in the United States, Latin America, South Africa, Western and Central Europe. The leading principles in the work with the young musicians, most of whom are still students, is respect for one's personal opinions, equal opportunities and flexibility in the system of work.

Petko Dimitrov has served as the orchestra's Music Director since 2013.

=== Music Directors ===
- Alexey Izmirliev (1991–1992)
- Eraldo Salmieri (Italy) (1992–1995)
- Rossen Milanov (1997–2013)
- Petko Dimitrov (2013–present)
