= List of works for the stage by Antônio Carlos Gomes =

This is a list of stage works by Antônio Carlos Gomes (1836–1896).

== List ==
File	Title	Genre	Subdivisions	Libretto	Première date	Place, theatre
	A noite do castelo	opera seria	3 acts	José Fernandes dos Reis, after the novel of the same name by António Feliciano de Castilho	4 September 1861	Rio de Janeiro, Theatro Lyrico Fluminense
	Joanna de Flandres	opera seria	4 acts	Salvador de Mendonça	15 September 1863	Rio de Janeiro, Theatro Lírico Fluminense
	Se sa minga	musical comedy		Antonio Scalvini	1867	Milan
	Nella luna	musical comedy		Antonio Scalvini	1868	Milan
	Il Guarany	opera ballo	4 acts	Antonio Scalvini and Carlo D'Ormeville, after José de Alencar's novel O Guarani	19 March 1870	Milan, Teatro alla Scala
	Telégrafo eléctrico	operetta		Joaquim José de França Júnior	1871	Rio de Janeiro
	Os mosqueteiros do rei					started in 1871, but unfinished
	Fosca	opera seria	4 acts	Antonio Ghislanzoni, after Luigi Capranica's novel La festa delle Marie	16 February 1873, revised 1878	Milan, Teatro alla Scala (both versions)
	Salvator Rosa	opera seria	4 acts	Antonio Ghislanzoni, after Eugène de Mirecourt's novel Masaniello	21 March 1874	Genoa, Teatro Carlo Felice
	Maria Tudor	opera seria	4 acts	Arrigo Boito and Emilio Praga, after Victor Hugo's drama Marie Tudor	29 March 1879	Milan, Teatro alla Scala
	Lo schiavo	opera seria	4 acts	Rodolfo Paravicini, after a play by the Vicomte de Taunay	27 September 1889	Rio de Janeiro, Theatro Imperial D. Pedro II
	Condor	opera seria	3 acts	Mário Canti	21 February 1891	Milan, Teatro alla Scala
