= Grand opera =

19th-century opera genre

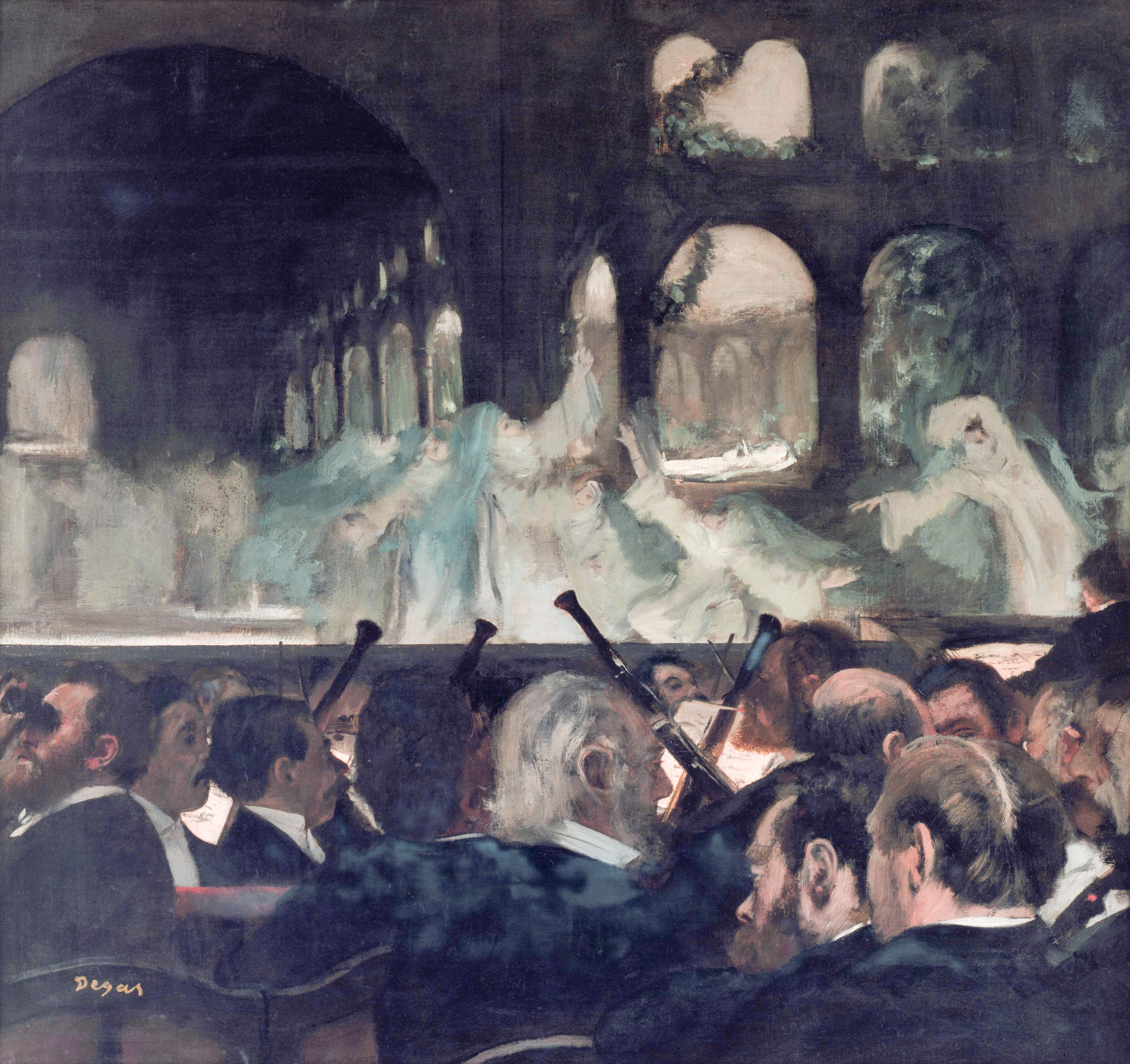
Degas (1871): Ballet of the Nuns from Meyerbeer's Robert le diable (1831); one of the earliest sensations of grand opera

Grand opera is a genre of 19th-century opera generally in four or five acts, characterized by large-scale casts and orchestras. The original productions consisted of spectacular design and stage effects with plots normally based on or around dramatic historic events. The term is particularly applied (sometimes specifically used in its French-language equivalent grand opéra, pronounced [ɡʁɑ̃t‿ɔpeʁa]) to certain productions of the Paris Opéra from the late 1820s to around 1860; 'grand opéra' has sometimes been used to denote the Paris Opéra itself.

The term 'grand opera' is also used in a broader application in respect of contemporary or later works of similar monumental proportions from France, Germany, Italy, and other countries.

It may also be used colloquially in an imprecise sense to refer to 'serious opera without spoken dialogue'.

== Origins ==
Paris at the turn of the 19th century was a magnet for composers, both French and foreign, especially those of opera. The term "grand opéra" became current in the early 19th century, with contemporaries like the critic Castil-Blaze defining it as a work that was sung throughout (in contrast to opéra comique), performed at the prestigious Paris Opéra, and had a noble subject. The librettist Étienne de Jouy further advocated for a five-act structure and plots drawn from heroic historical events. The aesthetic goals of the Empire were exemplified by works like Gaspare Spontini's Fernand Cortez (1809), which combined an exotic setting with melodramatic plots and spectacular tableaux, such as a cavalry charge and the burning of an Aztec temple. These large-scale works were the immediate forerunners of grand opéra. Other factors contributing to Parisian supremacy in operatic spectacle were the Opéra's ability to stage sizeable productions, its long tradition of French ballet, and its skilled staff of innovative designers like Duponchel, Cicéri, and Daguerre. The first theater performance lit by gas, for example, was Aladin ou La lampe merveilleuse at the Opéra in 1823.

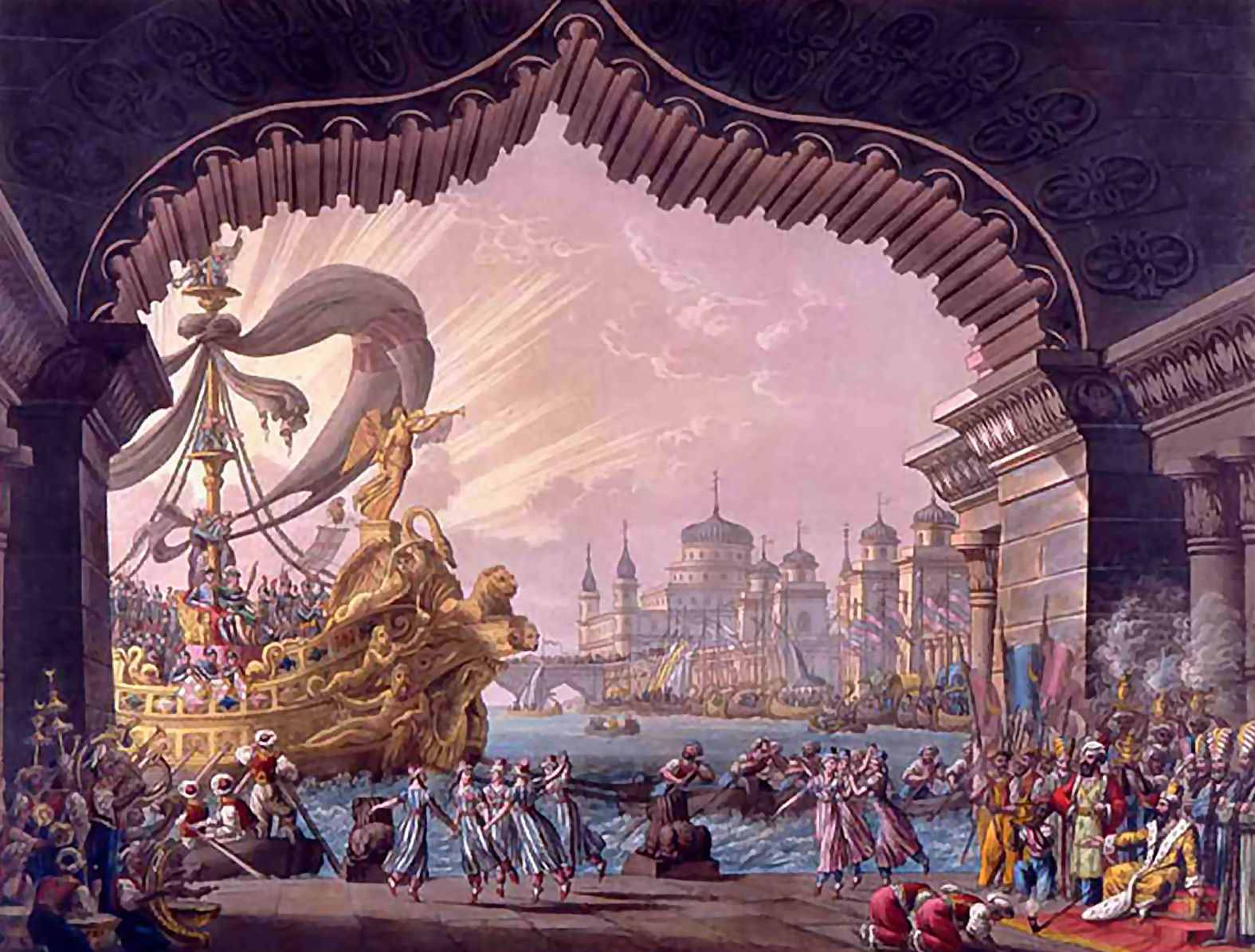
Set design by Francesco Bagnara for act 1 of Il crociato in Egitto by Meyerbeer

Several operas by Spontini, Luigi Cherubini, and Gioachino Rossini can be regarded as direct precursors to the genre. These include Spontini's La vestale (1807) and Fernand Cortez (1809), Cherubini's Les Abencérages (1813), and Rossini's Le siège de Corinthe (1827) and Moïse et Pharaon (1828). All of these have the characteristics of size and spectacle that would become hallmarks of grand opéra. An especially important forerunner was Giacomo Meyerbeer's Il crociato in Egitto (1824). Produced by Rossini in Paris in 1825, this opera successfully blended the Italian vocal style with German orchestral techniques, introducing a wider range of musical-theatrical effects than traditional Italian opera. With its exotic historical setting, on-stage bands, and themes of culture clash, Il crociato exhibited many of the features that would form the basis of grand opera's popularity.

What became the essential features of 'grand opéra' were foreseen by Étienne de Jouy, the librettist of Guillaume Tell, in an essay of 1826:

Division into five acts seems to me the most suitable for any opera that would reunite the elements of the genre: [...] where the dramatic focus was combined with the marvellous: where the nature and majesty of the subject [...] demanded the addition of attractive festivities and splendid civil and religious ceremonies to the natural flow of the action, and consequently needed frequent scene changes.

== France ==
=== The first grand operas (1828–1829) ===
The first opera of the grand opera canon is, by common consent, Daniel Auber's La muette de Portici (1828). This tale of a revolution set in Naples in 1647, which culminates in an eruption of Mount Vesuvius into which the heroine throws herself, embodied the musical and scenic sensationalism that would become the genre's hallmark. The libretto for La muette was by Eugène Scribe, a dominant force in French theater who specialized in melodramatic and historical plots. Scribe's first libretto for the Opéra, it was so well-suited to the public taste that he went on to write or be associated with many of the most successful grand operas that followed. La muette's reputation was further cemented by its being the catalyst for a genuine revolution when it was performed in Brussels in 1830.

This was followed in 1829 by Gioachino Rossini's swansong, Guillaume Tell. Rossini, a master of Italian opera, recognized the potential of new technology and larger-scale production, including bigger theatres and orchestras. In this undoubted grand opera, he proved he could meet these new demands. However, his comfortable financial position and the change in political climate after the July Revolution persuaded him to quit the field, making Guillaume Tell his last public composition.

=== The golden age of grand opera: 1830–1850 ===
After the Revolution, the new regime determined to privatize the previously state-run Opéra and the winner of the contract was a businessman who acknowledged that he knew nothing of music, Louis-Désiré Véron. However, he soon showed himself extremely shrewd at discerning public taste by investing heavily in the grand opera formula. His first new production was a work long contracted from Meyerbeer, whose premiere had been delayed by the Revolution. This was fortunate for both Véron and Meyerbeer. As Berlioz commented, Meyerbeer had "not only the luck to be talented, but the talent to be lucky." Meyerbeer's new opera Robert le diable chimed well with the liberal sentiments of 1830s France. Moreover, its potent mixture of melodrama, spectacle, titillation (including a ballet of the ghosts of debauched nuns), and dramatic arias and choruses went down extremely well with the new leaders of taste, the affluent bourgeoisie. The success of Robert was as spectacular as its production.

Over the next few years, Véron brought on Auber's Gustave III (1833, libretto by Scribe, later adapted for Verdi's Un ballo in maschera), and Fromental Halévy's La Juive (1835, libretto also by Scribe), and commissioned Meyerbeer's next opera Les Huguenots (1836, libretto by Scribe and Deschamps), whose success was to prove the most enduring of all grand operas during the 19th century. These demanding productions required expensive singers; for example, Les Huguenots was known as 'the night of the seven stars' because it needed seven top-grade artists.

Having made a fortune in his stewardship of the Opéra, Véron cannily handed on his concession to Henri Duponchel, who continued his winning formula, if not to such financial reward. Between 1838 and 1850, the Paris Opéra staged numerous grand operas of which the most notable were Halévy’s La reine de Chypre (1841) and Charles VI (1843), Donizetti's La favorite and Les martyrs (1840) and Dom Sébastien (1843, librettos by Scribe), and Meyerbeer's Le prophète (1849) (Scribe again). 1847 saw the premiere of Giuseppe Verdi's first opera for Paris, Jérusalem, an adaptation, meeting the grand opera conventions, of his earlier I Lombardi alla prima crociata.

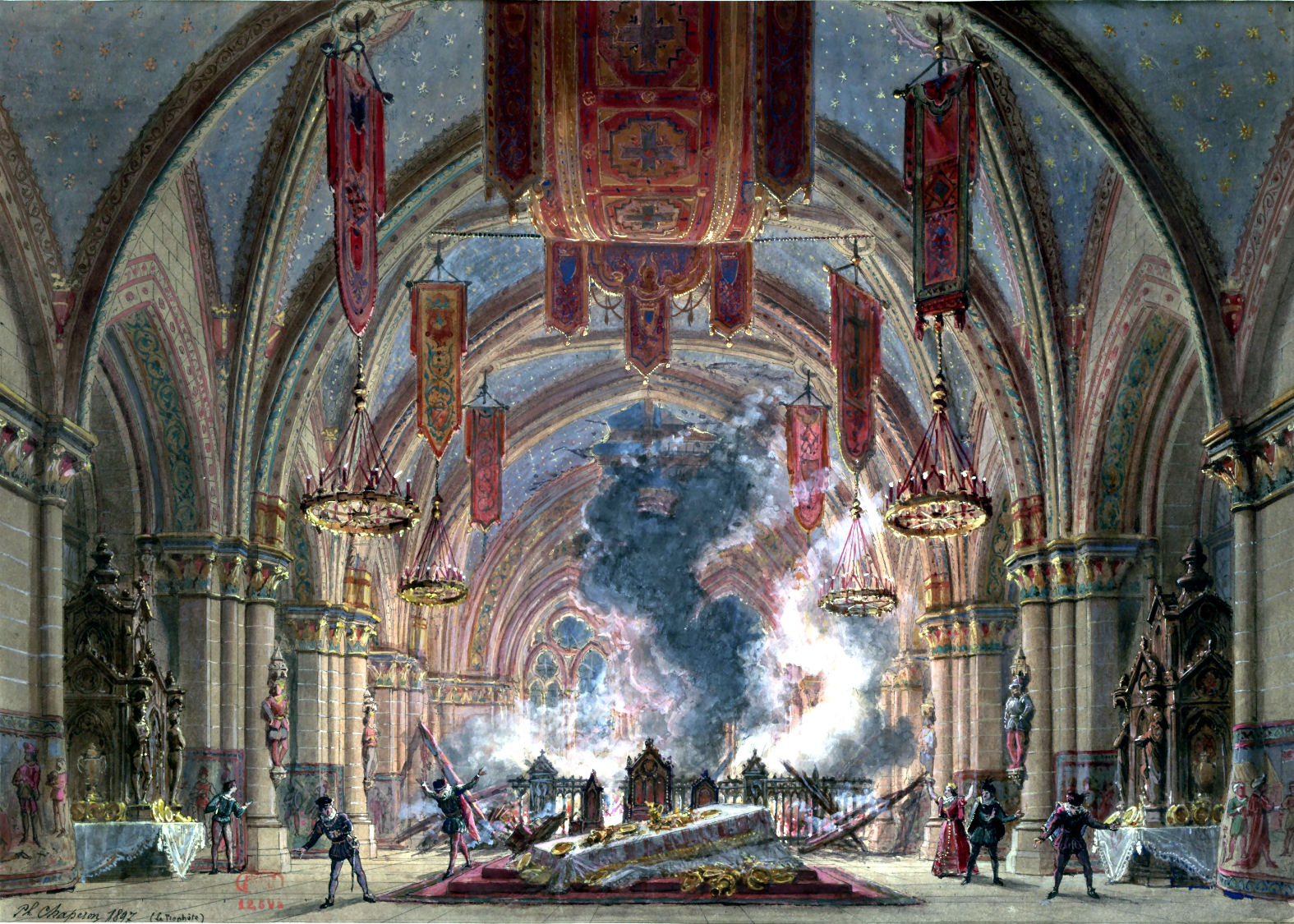
Meyerbeer Le Prophète set design for the final conflagration by Philippe Chaperon

For production statistics of grand opera in Paris, see List of performances of French grand operas at the Paris Opéra.

=== Ballet in grand opera ===
A notable feature of grand opera as it developed in Paris through the 1830s was the presence of a lavish ballet, to appear at or near the beginning of its second act. This was required, not for aesthetic reasons, but to satisfy the demands of the Opera's wealthy and aristocratic patrons, many of whom were more interested in the dancers themselves than the opera. These individuals also did not want their regular meal-times disturbed. The ballet therefore became an important element in the social prestige of the Opéra. Composers who did not comply with this tradition might suffer as a consequence, as did Richard Wagner with his attempt to stage a revised Tannhäuser as a grand opera in Paris in 1861, which had to be withdrawn after three performances, partly because the ballet was in act 1 (when the dancers' admirers were still at dinner).

=== Grand operas of the 1850s and 1860s ===
The most significant development, or transformation, of grand opera after the 1850s was its handling by Giuseppe Verdi, whose Les vêpres siciliennes (1855), proved to be more widely given in Italy and other Italian-language opera houses than in France. The taste for luxury and extravagance at the French theatre declined after the 1848 revolution, and new productions on the previous scale were not so commercially viable. The popular Faust (1859) by Charles Gounod started life as an opéra comique and did not become a grand opera until rewritten in the 1860s. Les Troyens by Hector Berlioz (composed 1856–1858, later revised), was not given a full performance until nearly a century after Berlioz had died, although portions had been staged before, but the spirit of this work is far removed from the bourgeois taste of the grand opera of the 1830s and 1840s.

By the 1860s, taste for the grand style was returning. La reine de Saba by Charles Gounod was rarely given in its entirety, although the big tenor aria, "Inspirez-moi, race divine", was a popular feature of tenor recitals. Meyerbeer died on 2 May 1864; his late opera, L'Africaine, was premiered posthumously in 1865. Giuseppe Verdi returned to Paris for what many see as the greatest French grand opera, Don Carlos (1867). Ambroise Thomas contributed his Hamlet in 1868, and finally, at the end of the decade, the revised Faust was premiered at the Opéra in its grand opera format.

=== Late French grand operas ===
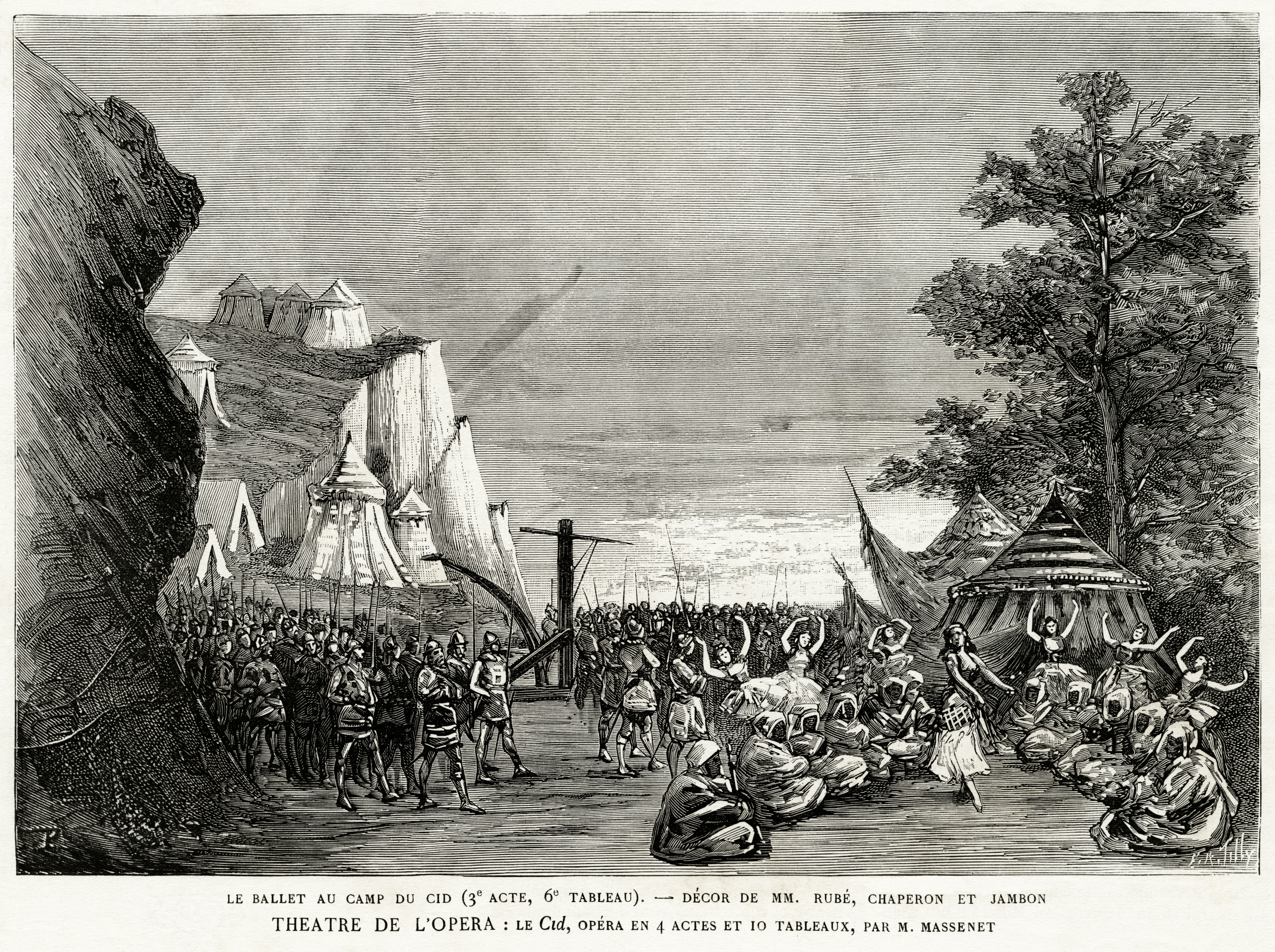
Le Cid: ballet at Le Cid's camp. Set by Rubé, Chaperon and Jambon.

During the 1870s and 1880s, a new generation of French composers continued to produce large-scale works in the tradition of grand opera but often broke its melodramatic boundaries. The influence of Wagner's operas began to be felt, and it is a moot point whether these works can be simply called grand opera. Jules Massenet had at least two large scale historical works to his credit, Le roi de Lahore (Paris, 1877, assessed by Grove as "the last grand opera to have a great and widespread success".) and Le Cid (Paris, 1885). Other works in this category include Polyeucte (Paris, 1878) by Charles Gounod and Henry VIII by Camille Saint-Saëns (Paris, 1883). Ernest Reyer had started to compose his Sigurd years earlier, but, unable to get it premiered in Paris, settled for La Monnaie in Brussels (1884). What may have been one of the last successful French grand operas was by an unfamiliar composer, Émile Paladilhe: Patrie! (Paris, 1886). It ran up nearly 100 performances in Paris, and quite a few in Belgium, where the action takes place, but has since disappeared without a trace.

=== Decline of French grand opera ===
The expensive artifacts of grand opera (which also demanded expensive singers)—Les Huguenots was known as 'the night of the seven stars' because of its requirement of seven top-grade artistes—meant that they were economically the most vulnerable as new repertoire developed. Hence they lost pride of place at the Paris Opéra (especially when many of the original stage sets were lost in fire in the late 19th century). However, as late as 1917, the Gaîté-Lyrique devoted an entire season to the genre, including Halévy's La reine de Chypre.

=== French grand opera today ===
Some of these works – Guillaume Tell, La favorite, Les vêpres siciliennes and Don Carlos, for instance – continue to have a place in the operatic repertoire. Even the pieces that are rarely staged are increasingly being resuscitated for compact disc recordings, and many are revived at opera festivals and by companies such as Palazetto Bru Zane.

After virtually disappearing from the operatic repertory worldwide in the 20th century, Meyerbeer's major grand operas are once again being staged by leading European opera houses.

== Grand opera outside France ==
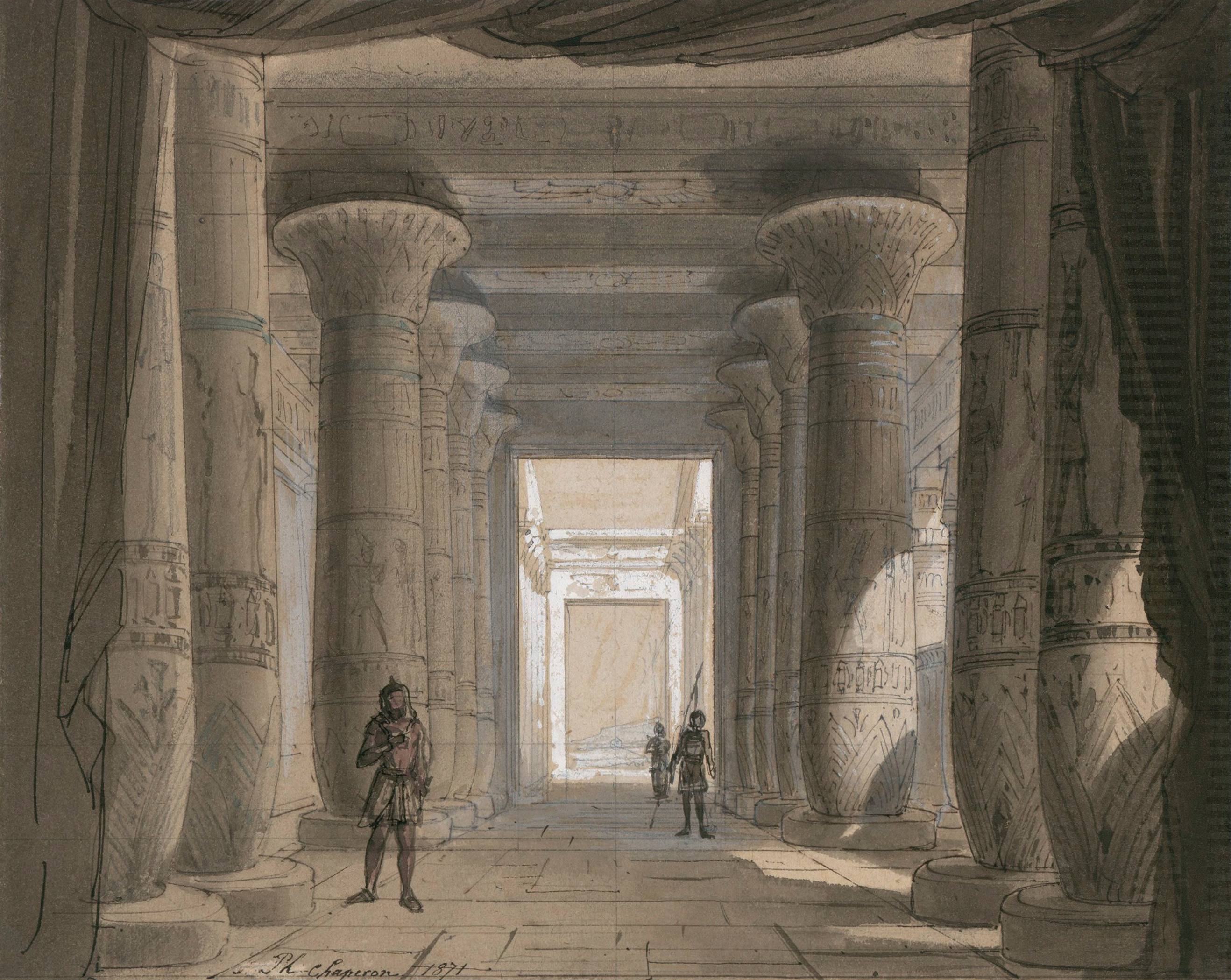
Set design by Philippe Chaperon for act 1 of Aida by Verdi, premiere production 1871 Cairo

=== Italy ===
French grand opera was generally well received in Italy, where it was always performed in Italian translation. The genre's influence sparked an evolution in local opera, leading to a formative phase that spanned over twenty years and produced works that challenged traditional formulas, such as Arrigo Boito's initially failed but iconoclastic Mefistofele (1868, revised 1875). This period saw composers experiment with stylistic innovations, including structural unity through recurring motifs and effective orchestration that utilized solo instruments like the bassoon in the Prelude to Filippo Marchetti's Ruy Blas (1869). Italian operas with their own ballet became relatively common in the late 1860s and 1870s. Some of these, like Antônio Carlos Gomes's Il Guarany (1870), were designated as "opera-ballo".

Giuseppe Verdi's Aida (1871), despite having only four acts, corresponds in many ways to the grand opera formula. Its immense success, both at its world premiere in Cairo and in its final form in its Italian premiere in Milan (1872), led to an increase in the scale of operas by other composers that followed. This trend was particularly noticeable in works that also featured free-flowing forms, dynamic declamation, and impressive stage effects. The "tumult" scene in Amilcare Ponchielli's La Gioconda (1876), for example, was built almost entirely in a spoken style with orchestral support, while audiences were deeply captivated by dramatic spectacles like the burning ship at the end of Act 2 or the exploding castle in Gomes's Il Guarany. Other works from this time included Gomes's Fosca (1873) and Salvator Rosa (1874), and Ponchielli's I Lituani (1874).

This style continued, though with less frequency, with later notable works including Gomes's Maria Tudor (1879) and Lo schiavo (1889); Marchetti's Gustavo Wasa (1875) and Don Giovanni d'Austria (1880); and Ponchielli's Il figliuol prodigo (1880) and Marion Delorme (1885). The last of these works, such as Alberto Franchetti's Asrael (1888) and Cristoforo Colombo (1892) and Ruggero Leoncavallo's I Medici (1893), coincided with the rise of verismo, an antithetical genre defined by its narrative concision and absence of dance. Italian composers began to modify vocal forms to better suit these new dramatic needs. As the Turin critic Ippolito Valetta observed in 1898, audiences' interest was flagging in long, inflated operas, as the public now preferred performances of two hours or so.

=== Germany ===
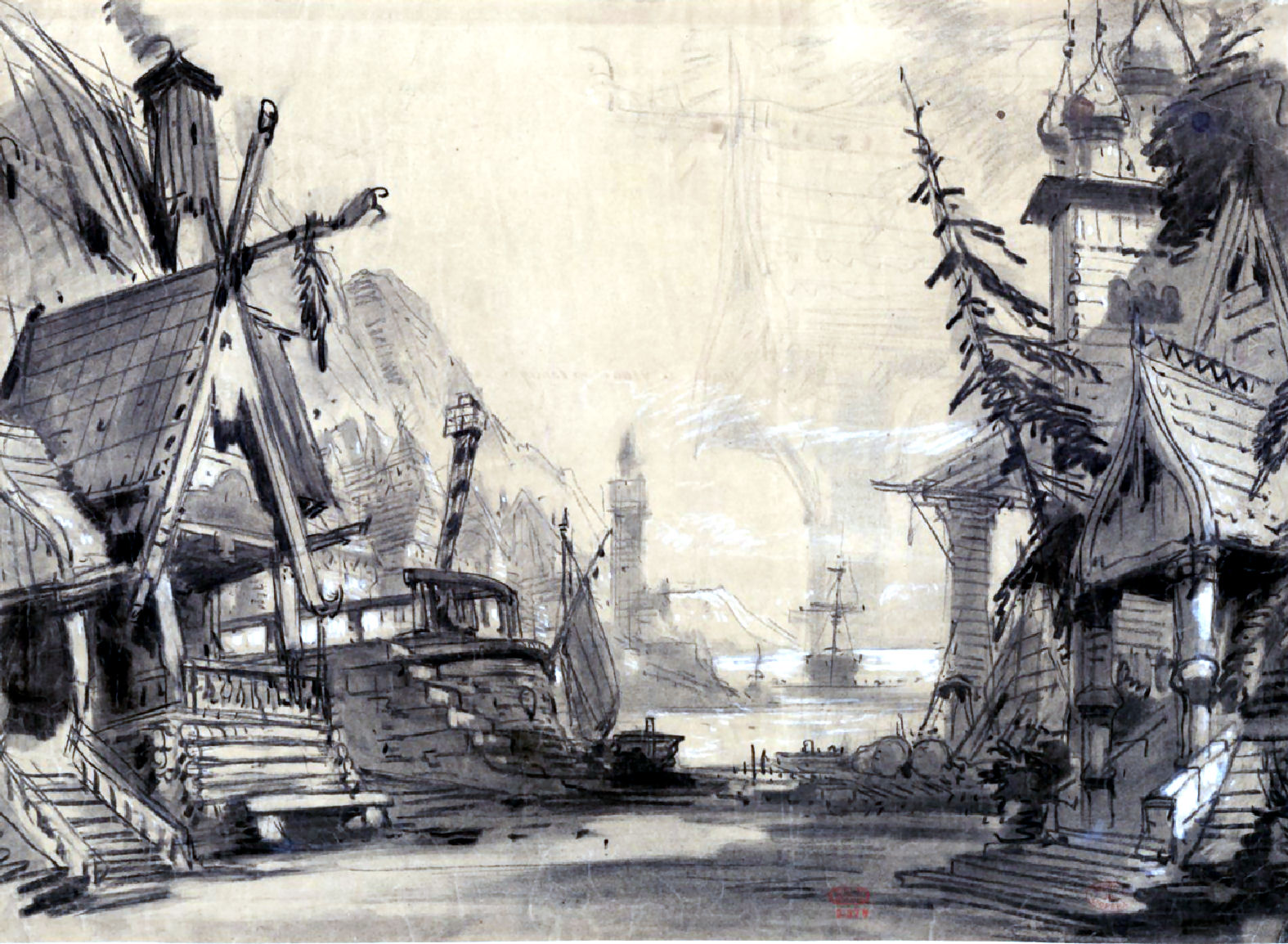
Stage design for act 1 of L'étoile du nord by Charles Cambon.

French grand operas were regularly staged by German opera houses; an early article by Richard Wagner depicts German opera managers hurrying to Paris to try to identify the next hit. The Dresden performances of Le prophète (in German) in 1850 were the occasion for a series of articles by Wagner's disciple, Theodor Uhlig, condemning Meyerbeer's style and crudely attributing his alleged aesthetic failure to his Jewish origins, inspiring Wagner to write his anti-Jewish diatribe Das Judenthum in der Musik ("Jewishness in Music").

Meyerbeer himself was German by birth, but directed nearly all his mature efforts to success in Paris. Richard Wagner's Rienzi, the composer's first success (produced Dresden, 1842) is totally Meyerbeerean in style. Wagner was at that time a sincere admirer of the older composer, who assisted him in arranging performances of Rienzi and Der fliegende Holländer in Dresden and Berlin. As described above, Wagner attempted in 1860/1861 to recast Tannhäuser as a grand opera, and this Paris version, as later adapted for Vienna, is still frequently produced today. Götterdämmerung, as noted by George Bernard Shaw, shows clear traces of some return by Wagner to the grand opera tradition, and a case could also be argued for Die Meistersinger von Nürnberg.

Meyerbeer's only mature German opera, Ein Feldlager in Schlesien is in effect a Singspiel, although act 2 has some of the characteristics of grand opera, with a brief ballet and an elaborate march. The opera was eventually transformed by the composer to L'étoile du nord.

In many German-language houses, especially in Vienna, where Eduard Hanslick and later Gustav Mahler championed Meyerbeer and Halévy respectively, the operas continued to be performed well into the 20th century. The growth of antisemitism in Germany, especially after the Nazi Party obtained political power in 1933, spelled the end of the works of these composers on German stages until modern times when La Juive, Les Huguenots, Le prophète and L'Africaine have been revived.

=== Czech lands ===
French grand opera found a receptive audience in the Czech lands, with works from composers like Auber and Rossini appearing in Prague and Brno from the early 19th century. The genre's popularity truly surged after the opening of the Provisional Theatre in 1862, which provided a platform for regular performances in Czech and for native composers to create new works. This tradition was carried forward by the grand new Czech National Theatre after it was rebuilt and reopened in 1883.

During the National Revival, many Czech composers adopted the grand opera model to create works based on national and historical subjects. Examples include Karel Šebor's The Templars in Moravia (1865) and The Hussite Bride (1868), as well as Karel Bendl's Lejla (1868) and Bretislav (1870). However, the success of Antonín Dvořák's grand operas provides a particularly important case study. His three full-scale works—Vanda (1876), Dimitrij (1882), and Armida (1904)—dealt with overtly political and religious themes. Dimitrij, in particular, was a quintessential grand opera featuring impressive crowd scenes, extended duets, and a ballet. It proved a resounding success with audiences at both the Provisional and National Theatres, despite being seen as "old-fashioned" by some critics. This stood in sharp contrast to the less successful premiere of Zdeněk Fibich's more Wagnerian The Bride of Messina at the National Theatre in 1884. Ultimately, while some composers like Bedřich Smetana with Dalibor explored other aesthetics, the grand opera style remained a powerful medium for Czech composers to express national sentiment.

=== Britain ===
In early 19th-century London, French grand operas were predominantly experienced in adapted forms. Performances occurred at three principal theatres: Her Majesty's Theatre (Italian language), Covent Garden (English, then Italian from 1847), and Drury Lane (English). Language choice reflected social stratification, with Italian associated with high culture and English with popular audiences. Key figures in adaptation included Henry Bishop, musical director at Covent Garden (1810–24) and later at Drury Lane, who created English versions of works like Rossini's Guillaume Tell (as Hofer, the Tell of the Tyrol, 1830) and Meyerbeer's Robert le Diable (as The Demon, or The Mystic Branch, 1832). Michael Lacy and James Robinson Planché also produced significant adaptations; Planché reworked Auber's Gustave III (1833) for Covent Garden, condensing it to three acts and altering morally sensitive plot elements. While adaptations varied in fidelity—Bishop's Robert largely preserved Meyerbeer's score, whereas Hofer radically reshaped Rossini—they fueled intense rivalry among theatres. London's first exposure to Robert le Diable (1831) was through these English versions, preceding the "authentic" Italian performance at the King's Theatre in 1832.

British composers began experimenting with grand opera conventions in the 1830s–40s, though often derivative of continental models. John Barnett's The Mountain Sylph (1834, Lyceum) integrated music and drama innovatively, influenced by Weber and French opera. His Fair Rosamond (1837, Drury Lane) featured grand opera elements like large choral tableaux. Michael Balfe emerged as the most prominent figure, blending Italian lyricism with French spectacle in works like Joan of Arc (1837), The Bohemian Girl (1843), and the Paris-composed The Daughter of St Mark (1844). Edward Loder's Raymond and Agnes (1855) also showed French influence. Later efforts approached Meyerbeerian scale: William Wallace's Lurline (1860) included expansive scenes and opposing choruses, while Charles Villiers Stanford's The Veiled Prophet (1881) featured processions, ballet, and political conflict. Arthur Sullivan's Ivanhoe (1891), commissioned for the Royal English Opera House, was explicitly conceived as English grand opera, boasting massive resources (large orchestra, chorus, elaborate staging) but faced criticism for dramatic incoherence and financial failure. By century's end, composers like Frederick Cowen (Harold, 1895) struggled to reconcile Wagnerian techniques with grand opera traditions, often resulting in stylistic disunity.

=== North America ===
French grand opera initially reached North American audiences primarily through adapted English-language performances in major cities like New York, Philadelphia, and Boston from 1835 onwards. Visiting English troupes and American companies staged works such as Meyerbeer's Robert le Diable, Rossini's Guillaume Tell, and Halévy's La Juive, often with significant cuts, modifications, and spoken dialogue replacing recitatives to suit local resources and tastes. New York venues like Niblo's Garden (hosting Meyerbeer), the short-lived Italian Opera House (1833–35), Palmo’s Opera House (1844–48), the Astor Place Opera House (1847–52), and the Academy of Music (from 1854) became key centers. A pivotal development occurred in 1843 when New Orleans' Théâtre d’Orléans introduced French comic opera and Donizetti to New York. Their 1845 return season firmly established grand opera in the repertory, featuring superior productions of Guillaume Tell, Robert le Diable, La Juive, Auber's La Muette de Portici, and Meyerbeer's Les Huguenots in French, achieving great success. New Orleans itself saw intense rivalry, with James Caldwell's Camp Street theatre premiering Robert le Diable in English in 1834, featuring minstrel performer 'Daddy' Rice, followed weeks later by John Davis's French production at the Théâtre d’Orléans. Davis's company later toured the Northeast extensively.

From the 1850s, demographic shifts, including an influx of German immigrants post-1848 and broader European emigration, gradually shifted preferences. Large opera houses were built, and Italian opera, later supplemented by German repertoire, supplanted English-language performances. All serious opera, regardless of origin (Auber, Meyerbeer, Verdi, Wagner), was termed "grand opera." By the 1880s, New York's cultural scene, epitomized by Edith Wharton's observation of the Italian translation tradition, saw the Metropolitan Opera (opened 1883) under Leopold Damrosch and later Anton Seidl champion German-language performances. French grand operas like Les Huguenots, Guillaume Tell, La Muette, La Juive, and Goldmark's Die Königin von Saba, sung in German, gained significant popularity in the 1880s-1890s.

San Francisco experienced mixed success with grand opera, such as the Bishop and Bochsa Company's English La Muette (1854) and Robert le Diable (1855), often hampered by limited resources for spectacle.

American compositional efforts emerged mid-century. William Fry's Leonora (1845, Philadelphia; envisioned with Ann Childe Seguin in the title role), often cited as the first American grand opera, leaned on Italian models, while his earlier Aurelia the Vestal (1841) engaged grand opera themes like religious conflict. New Orleans' strong French tradition arguably stifled local composition, though works like Eugène Prévost's opéra comique La Esmeralda (1840) were popular. Post-Civil War, composers often trained in Germany. Later attempts combined grand opera themes with Wagnerian or modernist influences, including Walter Damrosch's The Scarlet Letter (1896, Boston), criticized for its Germanic weight, John Knowles Paine's unperformed Azara (1883–98) featuring Christian/Muslim conflict and local colour, and Victor Herbert's highly publicized Natoma (1911, Philadelphia), set in Mexican-era California. Ultimately, Wagner's dominance and German musical training ensured grand opera's influence on American composers remained largely indirect by the early 20th century.

=== Latin America ===
Throughout the 19th century, Latin American opera was overwhelmingly dominated by Italian repertoire performed by local companies and visiting troupes. French grand opera itself was rarely staged directly. Exposure to the genre came indirectly, primarily through Italian opera-ballo (popular in the 1870s). Early performances of French works occurred through touring companies, such as Prosper Fleuriet's French troupe, which brought La Favorite and Guillaume Tell to Montevideo and Buenos Aires between 1852 and 1854. Grand operas also featured occasionally in repertories at major houses like Buenos Aires' Teatro de la Victoria (1850s) and the Teatro Colón (until 1888).

Native Latin American composers, often trained in Europe, began creating serious operas linked to expressions of national identity, though largely modelled on Italian and German forms rather than directly on French grand opera.

In Brazil, Emperor Pedro II fostered Italian opera in Rio de Janeiro (1844–56). The most significant figure was Antônio Carlos Gomes (1836–96), whose works like Il Guarany (1870, Milan), an opera-ballo featuring stylized indigenous music and spectacle, premiered successfully in Italy but dealt with Brazilian subjects. Later composers studied in Europe: Leopoldo Miguéz (1850–1902), influenced by Wagner and Franchetti, composed Os saldunes (1901, Rio, in Italian) set in Roman Gaul. Francisco Braga (1868–1945), a pupil of Massenet in Paris and visitor to Bayreuth, wrote Jupira (1900, Rio, in Italian).

In Argentina, Arturo Berutti (1858–1938), considered the first nationalist composer, studied in Leipzig and Italy. His lyric dramas Pampa (1897) on gaucho life and Yupanki (1899) on Incas blended Italianate style with Wagnerian influences and national history.

Elsewhere, composers like Mexico's Cenobio Paniagua y Vasques (1821–82) set Italian libretti (e.g., the Huguenot-themed Catalina di Guisa, 1859) within an Italian musical framework, incorporating epic qualities reminiscent of grand opera. Ultimately, the pervasive influence of Italian models and the later impact of Wagner overshadowed direct engagement with French grand opera in the development of Latin American national operatic traditions.

== General bibliography ==
- Bartlet, M. Elizabeth C.: "Grand opéra" in The New Grove Dictionary of Opera, 2: 512–517, ed. Stanley Sadie, Macmillan Publishers, London, 1992 ISBN 978-0-935859-92-8
- Charlton, David: "On the nature of 'grand opera'", pp. 94–105 in Hector Berlioz: Les Troyens, ed. Ian Kemp, Cambridge University Press, 1988 ISBN 978-0-521-34813-3
- Charlton, David, editor: The Cambridge Companion to Grand Opera, Cambridge University Press, 2003 ISBN 978-0-521-64683-3
- Crosten, William Loren: French Grand Opera: an Art and a Business, King's Crown Press, 1948. OCLC 557984867, 608910
- Cruz, Gabriela: Grand Illusion: Phantasmagoria in Nineteenth-Century Opera, Oxford University Press, 2020 ISBN 978-0-190-91505-6
- Gerhard, Anselm: The Urbanization of Opera: Music Theater in Paris in the Nineteenth Century, University of Chicago Press, 1998 ISBN 978-0-226-28857-4
- Huebner, Steven: French Opera at the Fin de Siècle: Wagnerism, Nationalism, and Style, Oxford University Press, 1999 ISBN 978-0-19-518954-4
- Pendle, Karin: Eugène Scribe and French Opera in the Nineteenth Century, UMI Research Press, Ann Arbor, 1979 ISBN 978-0-8357-1004-6
- Soubies, Albert: Soixante-sept Ans a L'Opéra en une Page, 1826–1893, Paris, 1893 OCLC 17710718, 503911859
- Warrack, John; West, Ewan, editors: "Grand Opera" in The Oxford Dictionary of Opera, Oxford University Press, 1992 ISBN 978-0-19-869164-8
- Wolff, Stéphane: L'Opéra au Palais Garnier (1875–1962), Paris, Deposé au journal L'Entr'acte [1962] OCLC 7068320, 460748195. Reprint: Slatkine, 1983 ISBN 978-2-05-000214-2
