= Theatro Lyrico Fluminense =

Demolished theatre in Rio de Janeiro, Brazil

- The Theatro Provisório (later renamed Theatro Lyrico Fluminense) depicted shortly after its construction in 1852
- Interactive map of the Theatro Lyrico Fluminense area
- Former names: Theatro Provisório

General information
- Architectural style: Neoclassical
- Location: Campo da Aclamação, Rio de Janeiro, Brazil
- Coordinates: 22°54′24.66″S 43°11′23.50″W
- Construction started: 29 September 1851
- Inaugurated: 25 March 1852
- Renovated: 1865
- Demolished: 30 April 1875

Design and construction
- Architect: Vicente Rodrigues

The Theatro Lyrico Fluminense (also spelled as Teatro Lírico Fluminense) was one of the main theatres in Rio de Janeiro, Brazil, during the mid-19th century and was for many years the primary theatre for opera performances in that city. It was demolished on 30 April 1875 to make way for a park.

== History ==
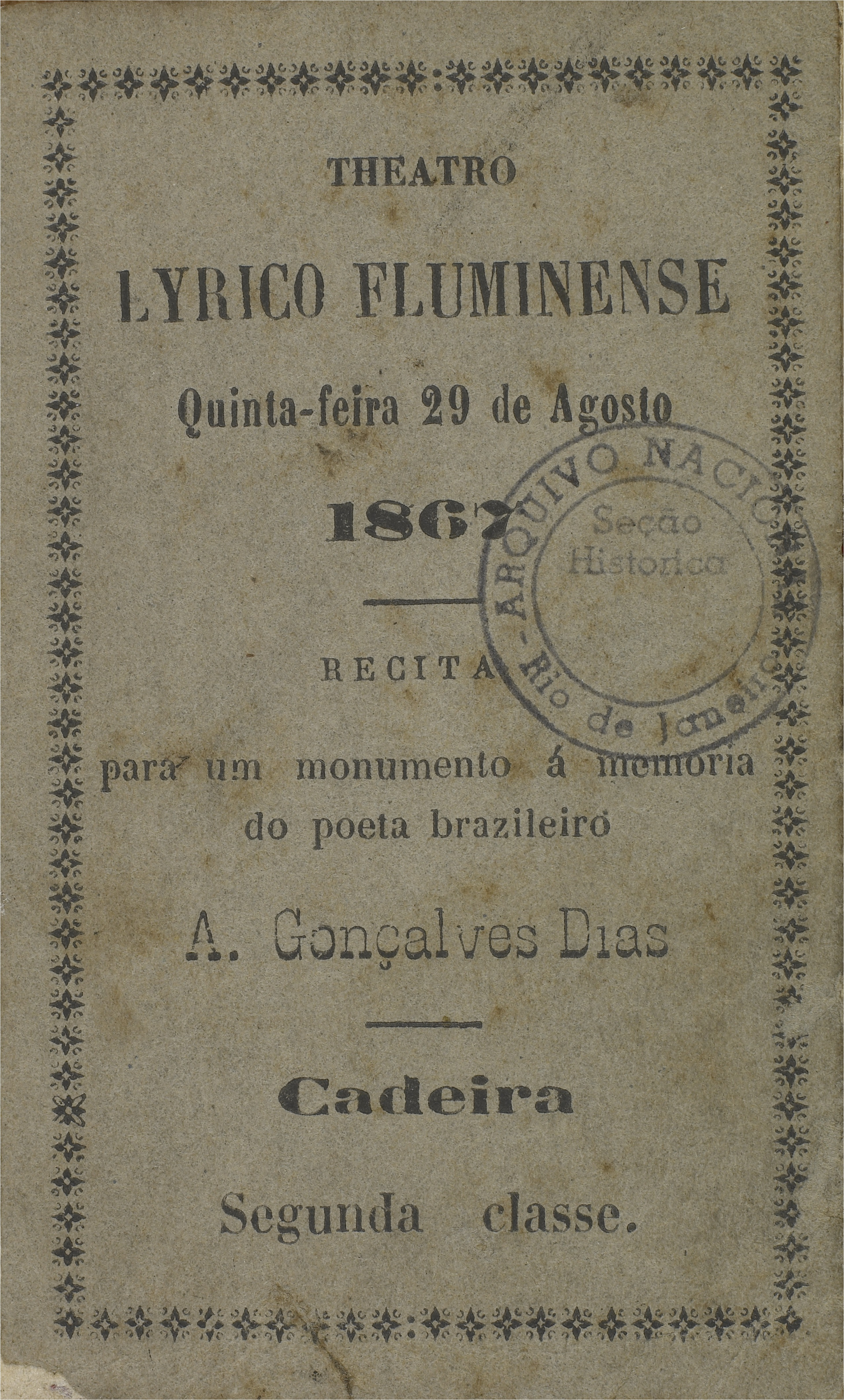
Ticket to the Theatro Lyrico Fluminense, 19th century (Brazilian National Archives)

When the Theatro São Pedro de Alcântara burned down in 1851, Rio de Janeiro was left without a theatre big enough to host the touring European opera, theatre and dance companies that had been performing in the city since the late 1820s. The city decided to build a new theatre as a matter of urgency. The theatre was originally intended to last for only three years, until the Theatro São Pedro de Alcântara could be rebuilt. Its construction was entrusted to a relatively inexperienced contractor, Vicente Rodrigues, and work began on 29 September 1851. Initially called the Theatro Provisório (the Provisional Theatre), it was completed six months later. The contractor held a masked ball there on 21 February 1852, and on 25 March 1852, the theatre was officially inaugurated with a performance of Verdi's Macbeth.

By 1854 the Theatro São Pedro de Alcântara had been rebuilt, but it was decided to keep the Theatro Provisório as well. As the theatre was no longer "provisional", it was officially renamed the Theatro Lyrico Fluminense on 19 May 1854, celebrating with a performance of Verdi's Ernani. For the next twenty years it was the leading opera house in Rio. The first two operas by Brazil's most famous opera composer, Antônio Carlos Gomes were premiered at the theatre: A noite do castelo (1861) and Joana de Flandres (1862). In 1871, the theatre saw the Brazilian premiere of Gomes' most famous work, Il Guarany. In addition to its opera season, the theatre also put on plays and concerts with appearances by performers such as Adelaide Ristori and Sigismond Thalberg.

Located in the Campo da Aclamação, the theatre had a simple neoclassical facade. Its rose-painted interior was more elaborate. The ceiling was decorated with portrait medallions honouring various composers and dramatists including Auber, Donizetti, Verdi, Bellini, Meyerbeer, Schiller, and Servandoni. In the center was Rossini surrounded by palm leaves and a laurel wreath. The arena section provided seating for 830 men (514 in seats, and 316 on benches). Seating for women and their escorts was provided by four tiers of boxes built of pine wood. However, the theatre's rapid and faulty construction led to many problems, not the least of which was the fear that it could collapse at any moment. There were also complaints about the poor acoustics and the ever-present dust that plagued the interior. The theatre was remodelled in 1865 when French tapestries and wallpaper, a ceiling fresco, and gas lighting were added.

Its demise began with the inauguration of the more magnificent Theatro Dom Pedro II in 1871. The Theatro Dom Pedro had better acoustics, a slightly larger seating capacity, and was located in a more fashionable street. The Theatro Lyrico Fluminense gradually went into decline and was demolished on 30 April 1875 to make way for a park.
