= A noite do castelo =

- Opera seria by Antônio Carlos Gomes
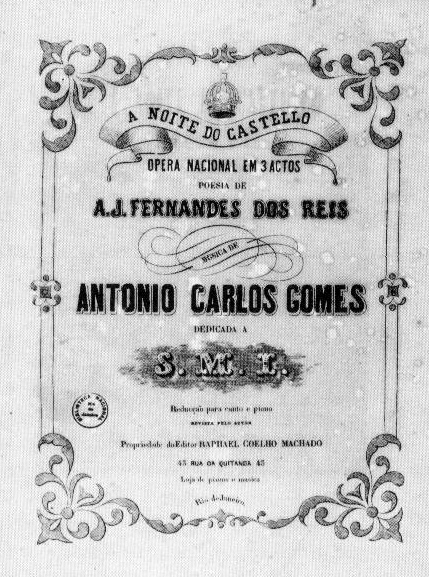
- Title page of the original score
- Librettist: Antônio José Fernandes dos Reis
- Language: Portuguese
- Based on: António Feliciano de Castilho's poem
- Premiere: 4 September 1861; Theatro Lyrico Fluminense in Rio de Janeiro

A noite do castelo ("The Night of the Castle") is an opera seria in three acts by the Brazilian Romantic era composer, Antônio Carlos Gomes. The libretto in Portuguese by Antônio José Fernandes dos Reis was based on António Feliciano de Castilho's 1830 poem of the same name. The work premiered at the Theatro Lyrico Fluminense in Rio de Janeiro on September 4, 1861.

== Performance history ==
A noite do castelo was Gomes' first opera and composed during his student years in Rio de Janeiro. He was encouraged to have the opera performed by José Amat, the first administrator of the Imperial Academy of Music and Opera Lyrica Nacional. In 1860, Gomes wrote a letter from Rio de Janeiro to his father, inviting him to the opening night which would take place the following year:

"Meu bom pai. Escrevo esta só para não demorar uma boa notícia. Afinal tenho um libreto. Foi extraído do poema de Castilho - A Noite do Castelo. Hoje mesmo começo a trabalhar na composição da ópera, prepare-se portanto, para vir ao Rio de Janeiro em 1861. Saudades muitas às manas e aos manos, principalmente ao Juca, abençoe-me como a seu filho muito grato. Carlos"

(Translation: "My good father. I write you this so that I do not delay any longer some good news to you. Finally, I have a libretto. It has been taken from a poem by Castilho - A Noite do Castelo. Today, I started working on the composition for the opera. Get yourself ready, then, to come to Rio de Janeiro in 1861. Send my longing love to my sisters and brothers, specially to Juca, bless me as your very thankful son, Carlos.")

The first performance of A noite do castelo by the Opera Lyrica Nacional at the Theatro Lyrico Fluminense on September 4, 1861, was loudly applauded, with contemporary accounts describing the audience as being "in delirium". Gomes conducted the performance, which coincided with the wedding anniversary of Emperor Pedro II, to whom the work was dedicated. Gomes was made a Cavalier of the Imperial Order of the Rose on the stage that night with Pedro II himself pinning the medal on the composer.

A noite do castelo never entered the operatic repertory outside of Brazil and in modern times it is very rarely performed even there. However, there is a 1978 live recording of a performance by the Orquestra Sinfônica da Campinas, the Coral da Universidade Estadual de Campinas and the Coral da Universidade de São Paulo.

== Roles ==
Role	Voice type	Premiere Cast, September 4, 1861 (Conductor: Antônio Carlos Gomes)
Leonor	soprano	Luiza Amat
Fernando, Leonor's fiancé	baryton martin/low tenor	Luiz Marina
Henrique, Leonor's husband, believed to be dead	tenor	Andrea Marchetti
Count Orlando, Leonor's father	bass	Mr. L. Ribas
Inêz, Leonor's lady-in-waiting	mezzo-soprano	Mme. Guillemet
Raimundo, Count Orlando's servant	baritone	Mr. H. Trindade
A Page	tenor	Mr. Soares
Roberto, Henrique's squire	silent role	unknown

== Synopsis ==
The story takes place during the first crusade. Henrique, Leonor's husband and a Knight Templar, has been reported to have died in battle by a messenger named Fernando who is also in love with Leonor. After around a year of mourning, Leonor finally gives in to Fernando's advances and the two are now set to be married. Leonor is very content with her new fiancé, who also loves her deeply, and all seems to be well. But things are not quite what they seem to be...

=== Act 1 ===
==== The Grand Ballroom at Count Orlando's Castle. ====
A large group of noblemen, maidens, and villagers have come to the castle to celebrate on the eve of the wedding of Leonor and Fernando. A page enters and announces to everyone that, Raimundo, a servant of the Count, will soon arrive with bad news. Everyone is curious, wondering what Raimundo will say. Raimundo enters and in his aria, "Era Alta Noite" , he tells the story of how, in one terrible night, while he was sitting at the porch of his house, alone, he suddenly heard a strange moan. When he raised his eyes, he almost died of fright; he saw the ghost of a knight, dressed all in black armor, gazing at the castle and whispering Leonor's name. When the guests inquire about the identity of the strange knight, Raimundo explains that he is already very old, his eyesight is not quite what it used to be, but that he thinks it was the ghost of Orlando's nephew, Henrique, who apparently had died in the Battle of Mount Zion. They then comment that Leonor will not be able to marry anyone else, if Henrique returns alive. Raimundo says that on the other hand, if it really is Henrique's ghost, then a horrible disaster shall fall upon everyone tonight. Suddenly, a strange knight enters the hall, dressed in black armor. The people want to know who this stranger is; whose face could be behind that helmet. The strange knight ends up cursing everyone, especially Leonor, whom he accuses of having broken the Promise of Eternal Love (aria "Nestes Sítios"). As he swears revenge, the party guests conclude that this knight really is Henrique's ghost and flee the scene.

==== Leonor's Bedroom ====
The scene changes to Leonor's chambers in the Castle, where she has retreated to with Fernando. Fernando tries to calm Leonor down, but she is completely distraught. She tells him that she has seen this very same knight in her dreams; in her aria, "Em Sono Plácido" , she goes into great detail about these dreams. At first, everything is lovely; she and Fernando are enjoying their day together, when suddenly, everything turns into darkness and a demented looking knight appears with a macabre expression on his face and lunges at her. Fernando tries to convince her that it is just a bad dream, but she retreats in fear, seeing, somewhere in her room, the terrible apparition of her dreams. Fernando is able to calm her down, indicating that she was hallucinating. They then hear the guests singing outside the room, "Hooray to Leonor and the noble Fernando!". Leonor, finally at ease, declares her love for Fernando, who in turn swears to always be by her side. They then leave the room and return to the party downstairs (cabaletta "Sim, Meu Amor"; this number has more often been performed as "As Fagueiras Esperanças". This change in the text comes from a later edition of the score with alterations made by an unknown author).

==== Back at the Ballroom ====
The guests rejoice and congratulate the soon-to-be husband and wife as well as the bride's father (choral ensemble "Exulta Orlando! Exulta Leonor!") who in turn express their gratitude for their kindness. Suddenly, the dark knight returns and frightens everyone; Count Orlando, Leonor's father, tries to deescalate the situation and offers the stranger a glass of wine, but it is in vain. The knight angrily replies that he would rather drink blood, and goes on to say that he was betrayed by the same people who are now partying. Fernando starts to lose his patience, especially after the knight ends up insulting everyone again. After Orlando presses him on what this is all about, the knight goes on to tell a story of two young lovers, who grew up together and where about to be married, when the man was called to battle and had to leave his betrothed behind. While at battle, he was captured by the enemy, but managed to escape; only to return and find his fiancée in the arms of another man (aria "Desde crianças"). Everyone is deeply moved by the tale, but he is not done yet; he produces a blue ribbon, and claims that it was given to him by a treacherous woman whom he once called his lover. He then proceeds to throw the ribbon at Leonor's feet, who faints. The men, outraged by the suffering inflicted upon Leonor by this strange knight, proceed to draw their swords and throw the knight out of the castle.

=== Act 2 ===
TBA
