= Anna D'Angeri =

Austrian-Italian opera singer (1853–1907)

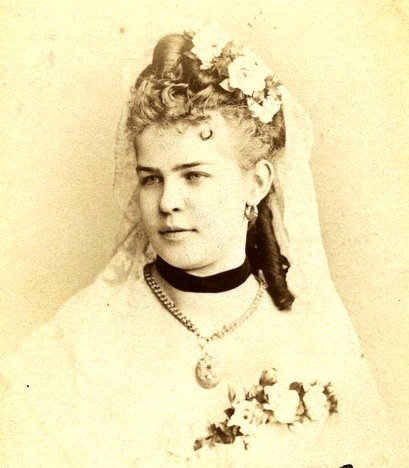
D'Angeri in St Petersburg, 1874

Anna D'Angeri (Angermayer de Redenburg; 14 April 1853 – 14 December 1907) was an Austrian-born opera singer, who adopted Italy as her country and Italianized her surname. She had a brief (1873–1881) but eminent career singing leading soprano roles at the venues of Vienna Hofoper and La Scala, Milan. Particularly admired by Verdi, she sang the role of Amelia in the premiere of the revised version of his, Simon Boccanegra. She also sang the roles of Ortrud and Venus in the London premiere of Wagner's Lohengrin and Tannhäuser. Additionally, she created the roles of Jefte in Ponchielli's Il figliuol prodigo and Maria in Gomes's Maria Tudor.
