= Lo schiavo =

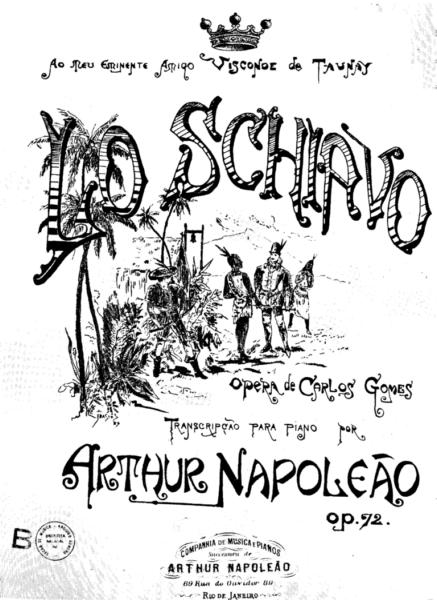
Cover of the score "Lo Schiavo" by Antônio Carlos Gomes

Lo schiavo (O escravo in Portuguese, The Slave in English) is an opera in four acts by the Brazilian composer Antônio Carlos Gomes. The Italian libretto was by Rodolfo Paravicini (1828–1900), after a 1876 play, Les Danicheff, by Alexandre Dumas fils and the travel experiences of Alfredo Taunay. The opera deals with the subject of slavery, a major concern in Brazil at the time (the institution had only been abolished by the Lei Áurea in 1888).

As Gerard Béhague explains, "Lo schiavo is considered in Brazil to be the best of Gomes's operas, as it reflects a national subject which required and was given new treatment."

== Performance history ==
It was first performed at the Theatro Imperial Dom Pedro II, Rio de Janeiro on 27 September 1889. Also in 1889, in her first presentation as the first female conductor in Brazilian history, Chiquinha Gonzaga conducted Lo schiavo in the presence of Carlos Gomes, her close friend, who paid her homage. Upon his premiere, audiences were highly favorable but critics were less positive in their view, finding fault with the libretto primarily. The work was later performed eight times in Rio de Janeiro and then three times in São Paulo. The opera would make a reemergence in 1921 and then again in 2010 and 2019.

== History of the libretto ==
Work on the libretto began in 1881 with a rough, four-act sketch created by Taunay taking inspiration from slavery and featuring a black protagonist. The draft was accepted but the prevailing complaint by Gomes was the overabundance of indigenous characters, leading to edits being taken beginning in 1883. However, Taunay would express his disagreements with the changes in an article published in 1889. Scholarship is still unclear as to who is truly responsible for the changes in the libretto.

It is known that at the time of editing the libretto the novel, The Confederation of Tamoios (1856) by Gonçalves de Magalhães had been published, its main premise being used in the painting The Last Tamoio (1883) by Rodolfo Amoedo. Although it is unlikely Gomes and Taunay would see the painting, it is likely the pair were influenced by the novel to some degree, as its plot deals with indigenous-conqueror warfare.

== Roles ==
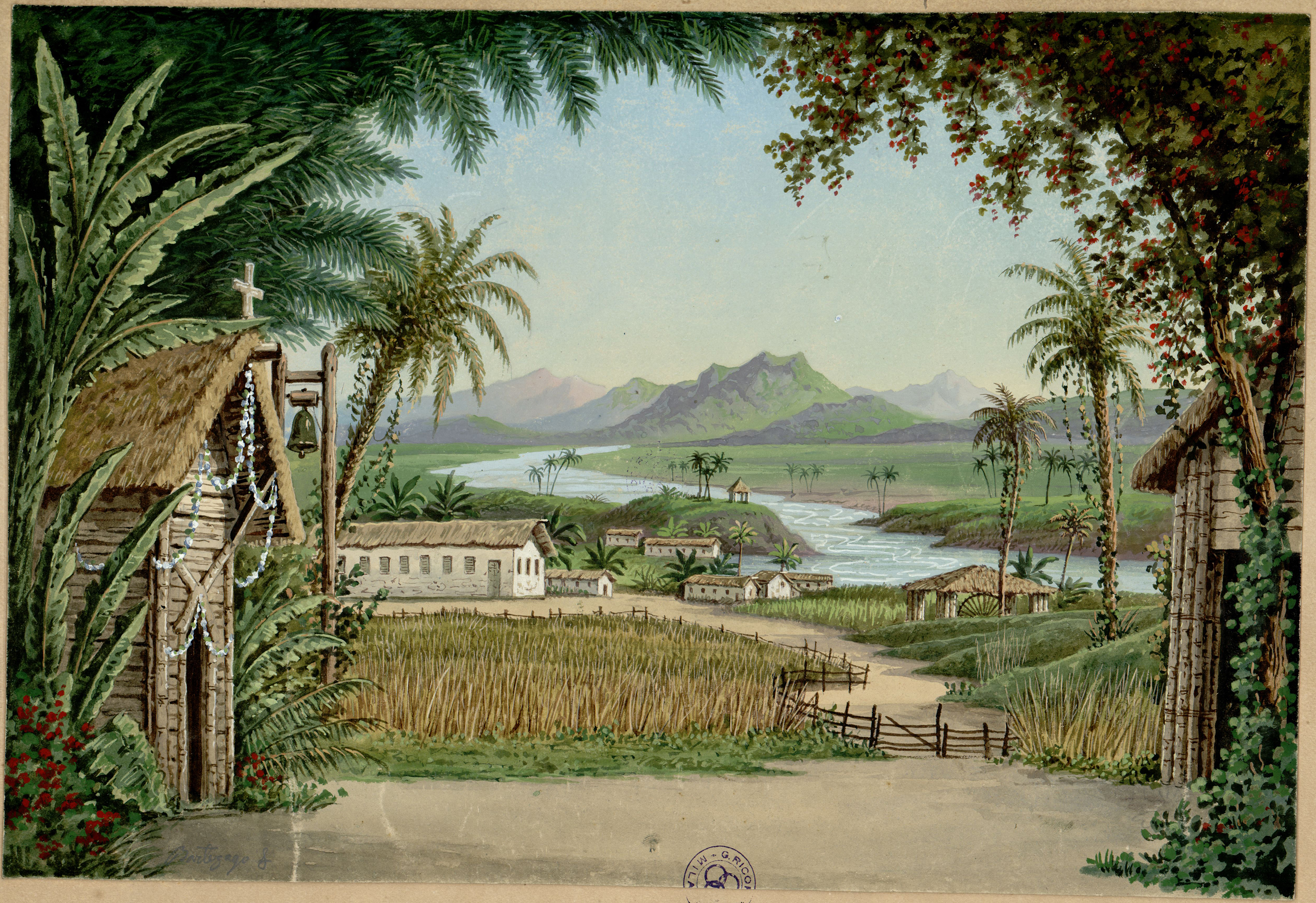
Set design for act 1

Roles, voice types, premiere cast
Role	Voice type	Premiere cast, 27 September 1889 Conductor: Carlos Gomes
Ilàra	soprano	Maria Peri
Condesa Boissy	soprano	Marie Oster van Cauteren
Américo	tenor	Franco Cardinali
Ibère	baritone	Innocente De Anna
Gianfèra	baritone	Francesco Bartolomasi
Conde Rodrigo	bass	Enrico Serbolini
Guarûco	tenor	
Tapacoà	tenor	
Tupinambà	baritone	
Goitacà	bass	
Lion	bass	
Indigenous warriors, French ladies, French officials, comrades, henchmen, count's servants (chorus)

== Synopsis ==
Time: 1567
Place: Rio de Janeiro and outskirts, Brazil

=== Act 1 ===
Ilàra and Iberè are currently held captive on Count Rodrigo's farm. Americo has fallen in love with Ilàra and the love is reciprocated who wishes for freedom. The Count hears about the ongoing revolt in Guanabara and fearing the same will befall his farm, sends to have the most troublesome slave punished as an example. However, Americo interferes and saves Ibere from punishment. Being fed up with his son's love interest, the Count sends Americo to Rio de Janeiro to fight against the native uprising and promises to ratify his marriage to Illara when he returns. But the Count instead marries Illara and Ibere and sells them on a slave market in Guanabara.

=== Act 2 ===
Place: Niterói

A French garrison has been created to help the natives fight against the Portuguese conquerors. Countess of Boissy, known for her abolitionist sympathies, invites Americo to her home. She begins to fall in love with him but he refuses due to his devotion to Ilara. Later, she organizes the liberation of her slaves and to Americo's surprise, Ilara and Ibere are among them. He begins to feel anger and vows to kill Ibere.

=== Act 3 ===
Place: Jacarepaguá

Now free, Ibere tries hard to win the eye of Ilara who refuses because of her faithfulness to Americo. Reluctantly, Ibere accepts the situation and joins the anti-Portuguese force.

=== Act 4 ===
Leading various tribes, Ibere charges the Portuguese forces, although at the same time internally dealing with the loss of his former love and realization of her love to Americo. The orchestra depicts the battle and the sounds of the animals, environment, and the forces battling each other. Americo is eventually imprisoned and brought to Ibere but is freed by him. Americo and Ilara try to escape but are caught. However, Ibere kills himself in their place out his respect for the couple's love.
