= Teatro de la Victoria (Buenos Aires) =

19th-century theatre building

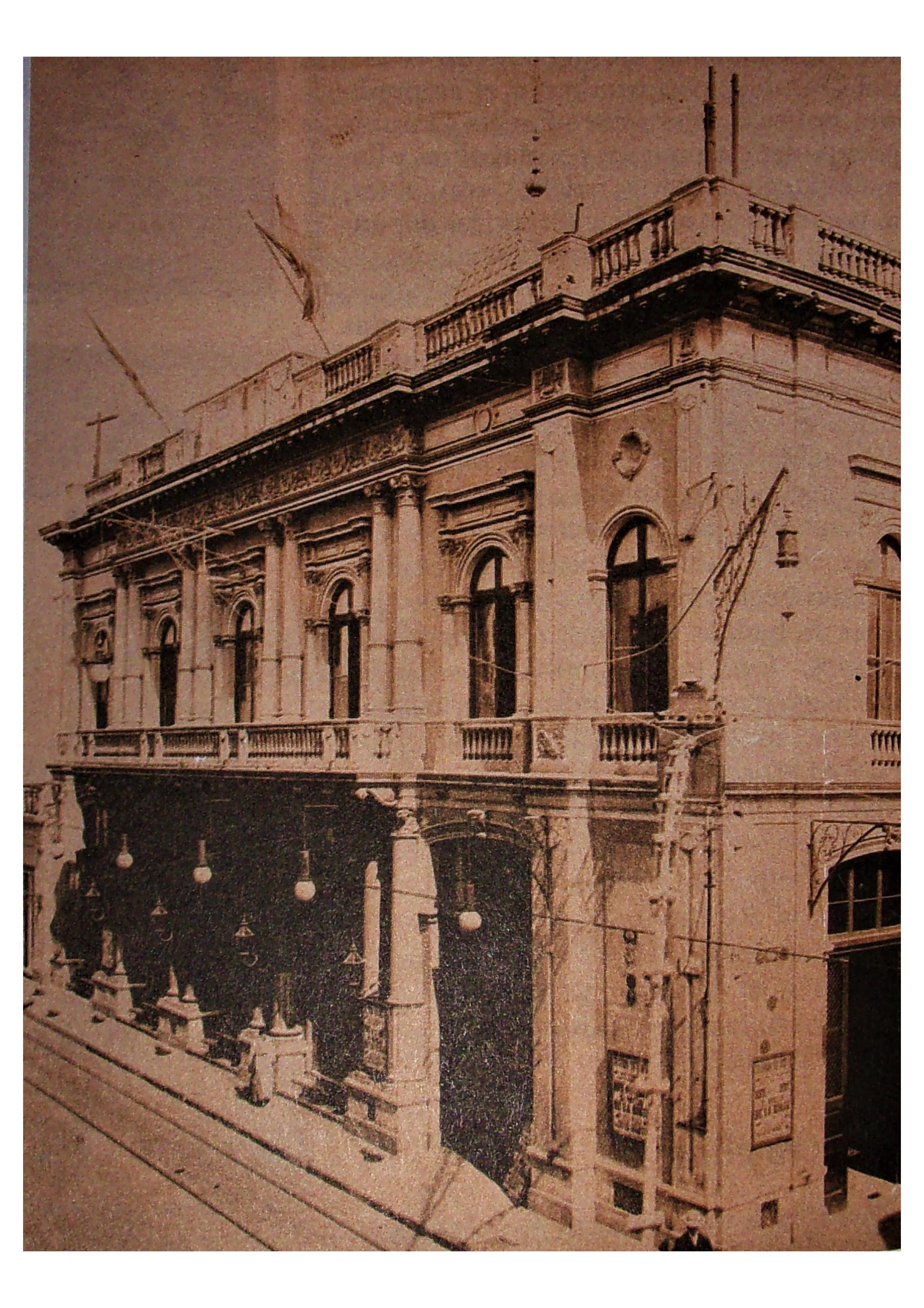
- Teatro de la Victoria, c. 1880
- Interactive map of the Teatro de la Victoria area

General information
- Status: Theater
- Location: Monserrat, Buenos Aires, Calle de la Victoria No. 954
- Inaugurated: May 24, 1838
- Closed: c. 1880

Design and construction
- Architects: José Santos Sartorio; Ildefonso Pagano

Teatro de la Victoria was one of the main theaters in the city of Buenos Aires around the middle of the 19th century. It was one of the most modern and luxurious of its time, built by an Italian architect who also had carried out the works of the Parroquia Nuestra Señora de Balvanera.

== History ==
The Teatro de la Victoria of Buenos Aires was built during the government of Juan Manuel de Rosas by the architects José Santos Sartorio and Ildefonso Pagano. His building was established on Victoria street No. 954, current Hipolito Irigoyen between Tacuarí and Bernardo de Irigoyen, Monserrat neighborhood.

It was inaugurated on May 24, 1838, with the function of "Amantes y celesos, todos son locos", a comedy written by Ventura de la Vega. Among the most distinguished artists who made presentations at the Teatro de la Victoria, are included the Compañia Dramatica Española of Matilde Duclós and José Ortiz, the Italian musician Agostino Robbio, and the Argentine pianist Remigio Navarro.

It was attended by notable members of the national and international aristocracy as María del Carmen Sáenz de la Quintanilla, wife of General Carlos María de Alvear, Miguel Otero, governor of Salta, and John James Onslow, Captain of the HMS Daphne.

== Gallery ==
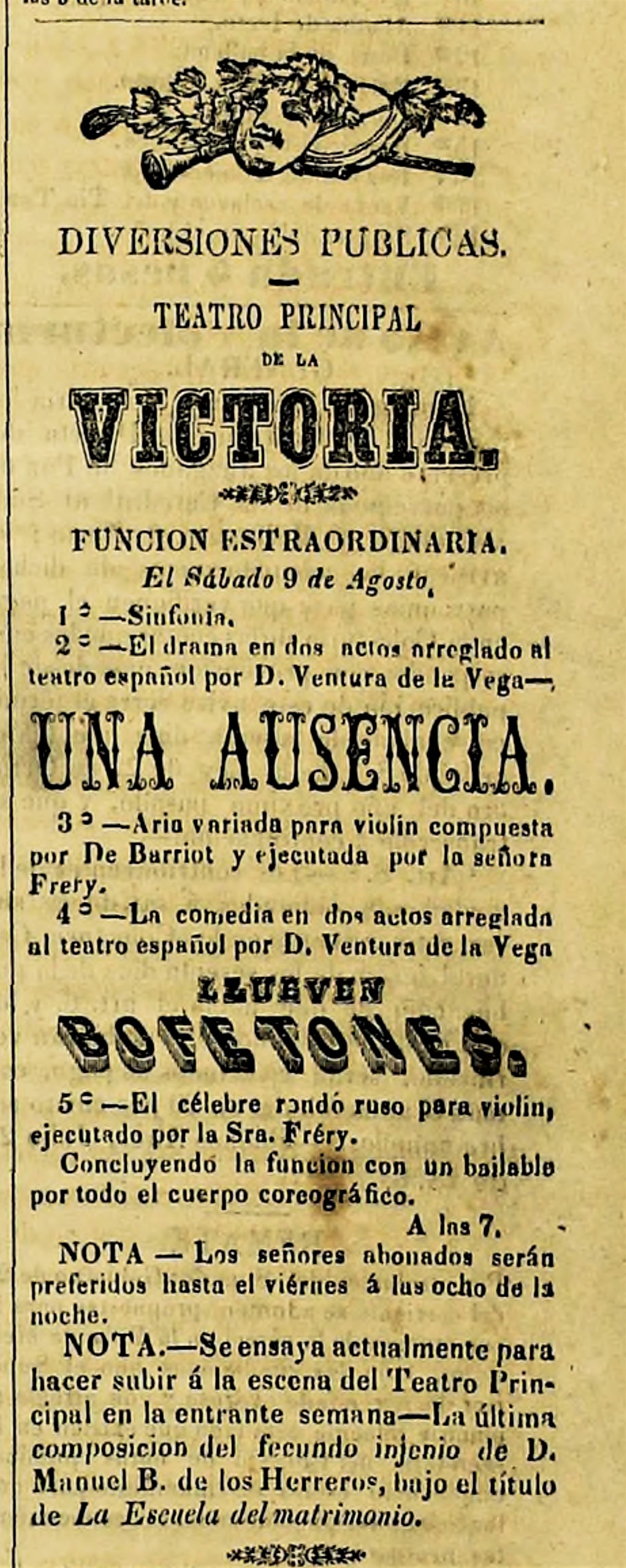
Billboard of the Teatro de la Victoria in 1856

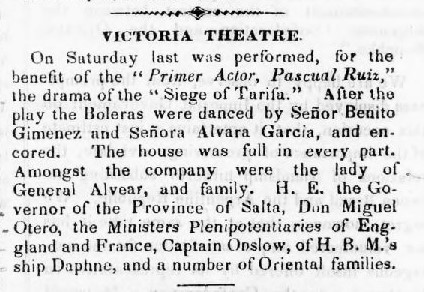
announcement about the Victory Theatre in the British Packett

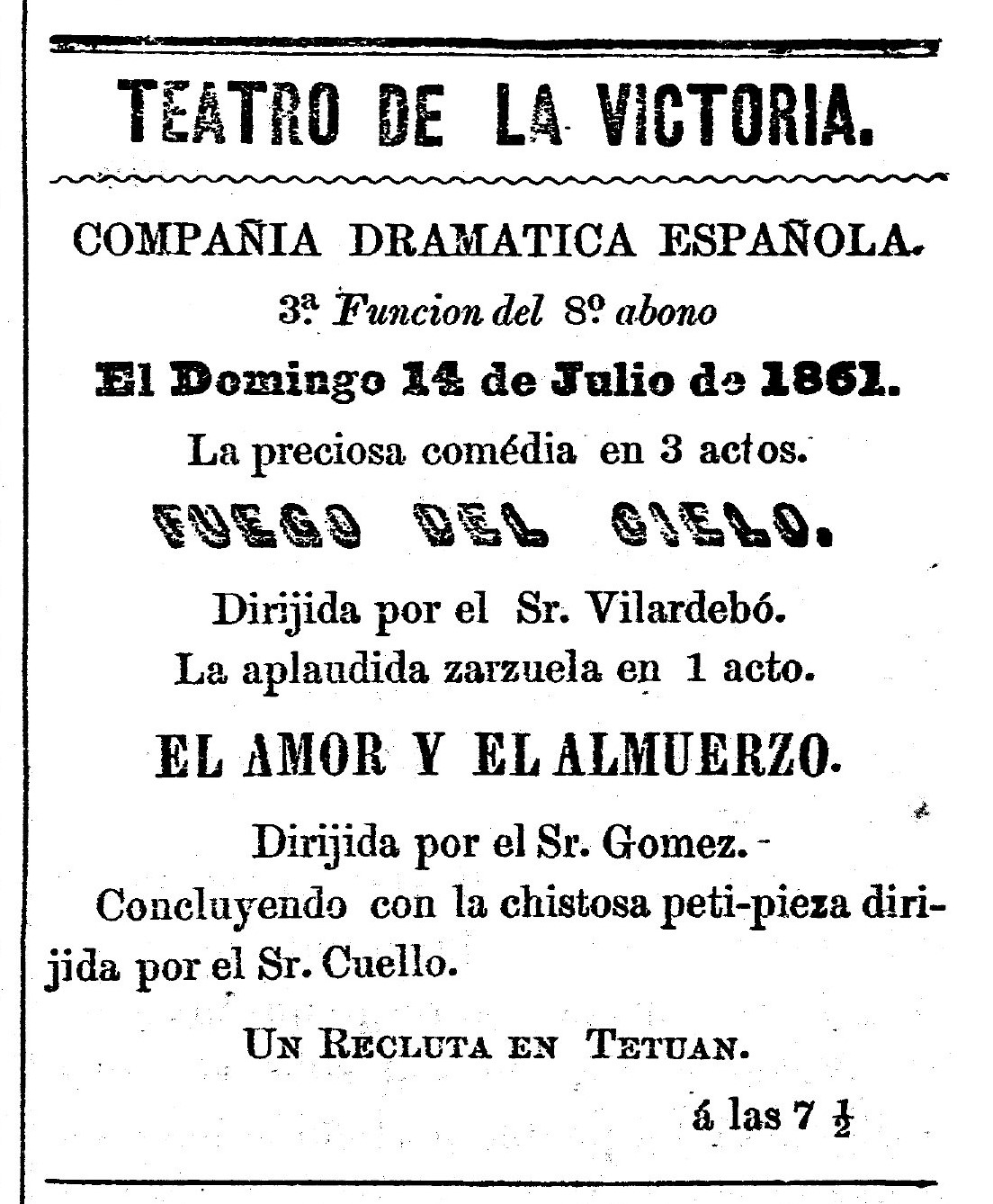
billboard of the Compañía Dramática Española
