= Maria Tudor =

Italian opera by Gomes

- Opera by Antônio Carlos Gomes
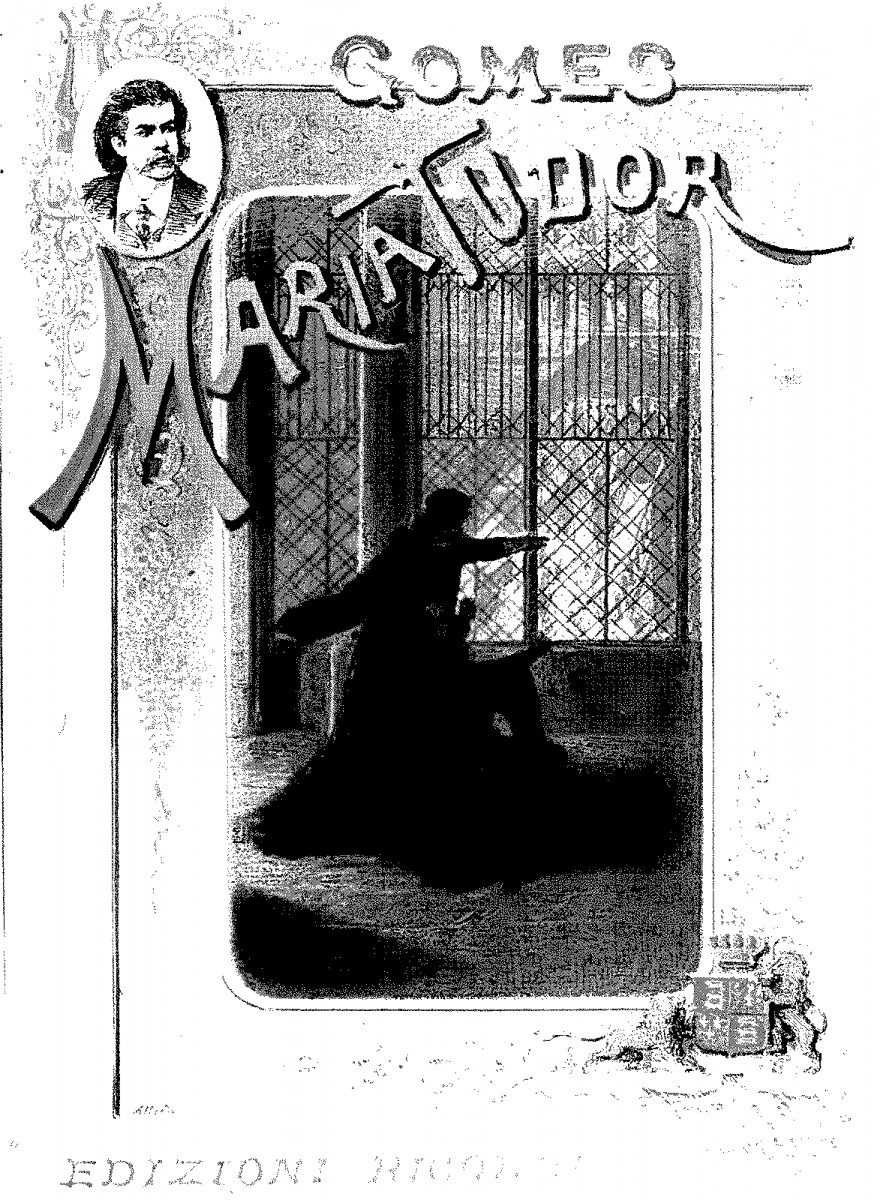
- Reproduction of the cover of the opera Maria Tudor, composed by Carlos Gomes.
- Librettist: Emilio Praga
- Language: Italian
- Based on: Hugo's Marie Tudor
- Premiere: 27 March 1879; La Scala, Milan

Maria Tudor is an opera in four acts composed by Antônio Carlos Gomes to an Italian-language libretto by Emilio Praga (completed by Arrigo Boito). The libretto is based on Victor Hugo's 1833 play Marie Tudor, which centers on the rise, fall and execution of Fabiano Fabiani, a fictional favourite of Mary I of England. The opera premiered on 27 March 1879 at La Scala, Milan, with Anna D'Angeri in the title role and Francesco Tamagno as Fabiani. The cast also included Joseph Kaschmann as the villainous Don Gil and Édouard de Reszke as Gilberto. The opera was a failure at its premiere and withdrawn, a heavy blow to Gomes who was facing serious financial and family difficulties at the time. He returned to his native Brazil the following year.

Maria Tudor was revived in November 1998 at the Bulgarian National Opera in Sofia with Eliane Coelho in the title role. The performance was televised and a live recording released on CD by the Brazilian label ImagemData.
