= Il Guarany =

Opera by Carlos Gomes

- Opera by Antônio Carlos Gomes
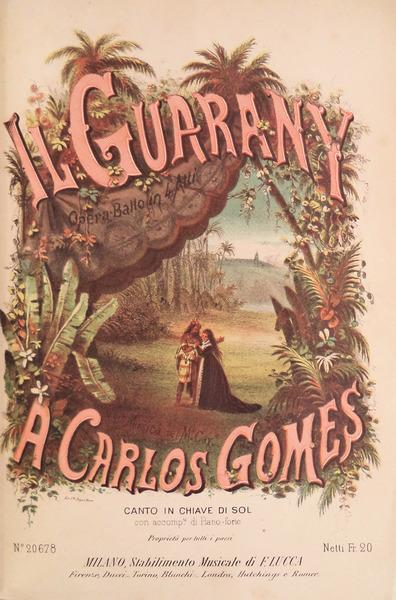
- Cover of the score
- Librettist: Antonio Scalvini; Carlo D'Ormeville
- Language: Italian
- Based on: José de Alencar's O Guarani
- Premiere: 19 March 1870; La Scala, Milan

Il Guarany (The Guarany) is an opera ballo composed by Antônio Carlos Gomes, based on the novel O Guarani by José de Alencar. Its libretto, in Italian rather than Gomes' native Portuguese, was written by Antonio Scalvini and Carlo D'Ormeville. The work is notable as the first Brazilian opera to gain acclaim outside Brazil. Maria Alice Volpe has analysed the historical subtext of the indianism movement behind Il Guarany.

The operatic version of the story takes place near Rio de Janeiro in 1560, and the plot centers around an interracial love story between Pery, a Guarani Indian prince, and Cecilia, the daughter of a Portuguese nobleman. The work emphasizes the Romanticized concept of the "noble savage" in an exotic Brazilian tropical setting as well as the concept of racial miscegenation, which had been a significant part of Brazilian life since the country's inception. In the Overture to the opera, Gomes creates a Romantic Indianist atmosphere over an Italian orchestral backdrop as he introduces intimate lyrical passages in the winds and strings contrasted by tempestuous dramatic moments that utilize the full dynamic range of the orchestra.

== Performance history ==
Overture
United States Marine Band

The world premiere took place at La Scala, Milan, on 19 March 1870 and was a tremendous success, which resulted in immediate international fame for Gomes and numerous performances of the work in opera theaters throughout Europe. Among the productions, it was performed at the Zagreb theater in 1883 and 1886. The first Brazilian performance was in Rio de Janeiro on 2 December 1870, at the Theatro Lyrico Fluminense. More recently, in 1996, Il Guarany was mounted by the Washington National Opera with Plácido Domingo in the role of Pery.

The duet "Sento una forza indomita" for tenor and soprano was in the recorded repertoire of Francesco Marconi with Bice Mililotti, 1908, and of Enrico Caruso with Emmy Destinn, 1914.

== Roles ==
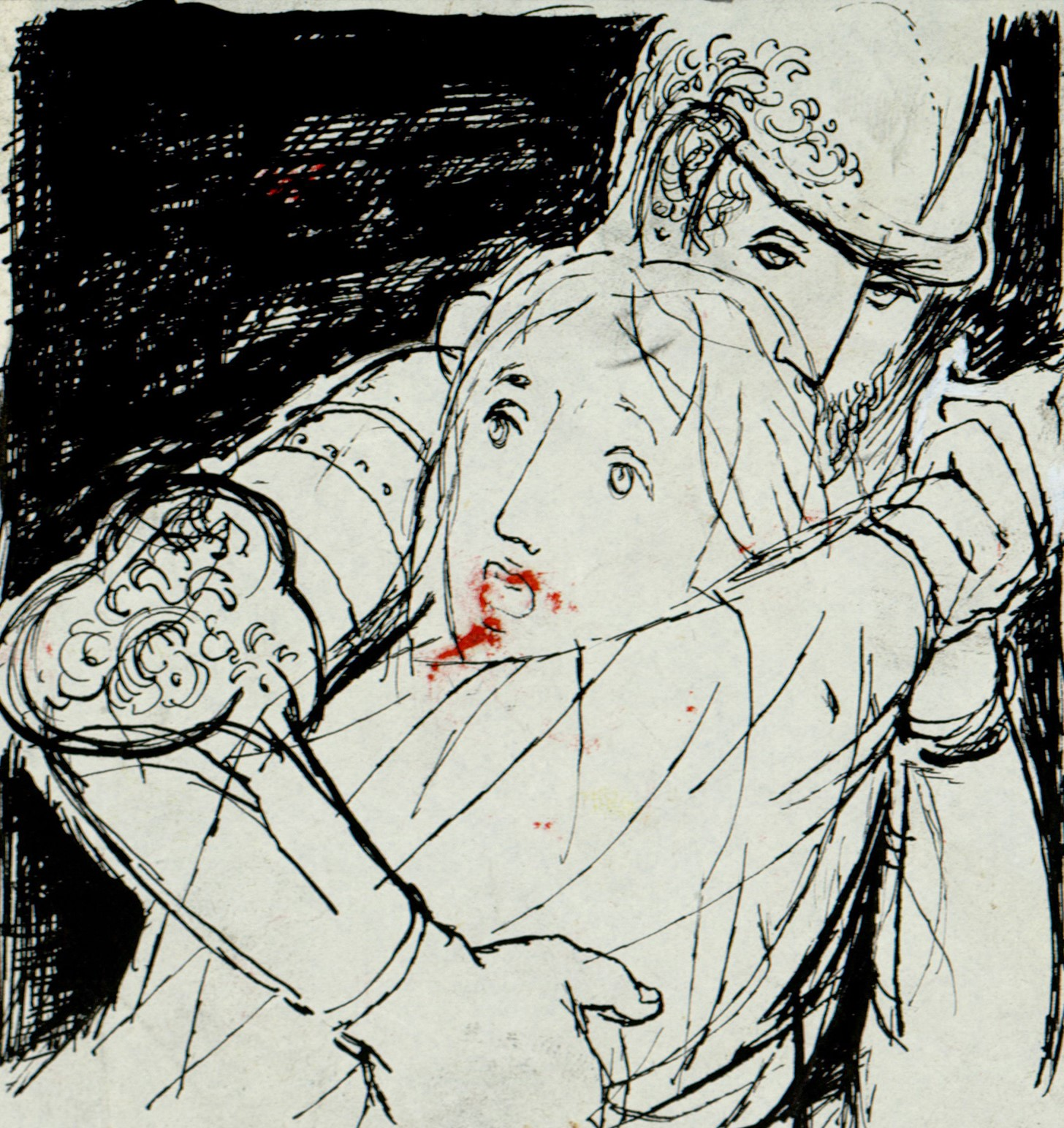
Disegno per copertina di libretto, drawing for Il Guarany (undated).

Roles, voice types, premiere cast
Role	Voice type	Premiere cast, 19 March 1870 Conductor: Eugenio Terziani
Dom Antonio de Mariz, a Portuguese nobleman	bass	Teodoro Coloni
Cecilia, his daughter	soprano	Marie Sasse
Peri, son of the Guarani tribal chief	tenor	Giuseppe Villani
Gonzales, a Spanish adventurer	baritone	Enrico Storti
Il Cacico, chief of the Aymoré Indians	bass	Victor Maurel
Alonso	bass	Severino Mazza
Don Alvaro	tenor	Giuseppe Masato
Ruy-Bento	tenor	Annibale Micheloni
Pedro	bass	Severino Mazza
