= Theatro D. Pedro II =

Theatre in Rio de Janeiro, Brazil

Teatro D. Pedro II

General information
- Location: Rio de Janeiro, Brazil
- Named for: Dom Pedro II
- Inaugurated: 1875
- Demolished: 1934

The Teatro D. Pedro II was a theatre in Rio de Janeiro, Brazil, and named after Dom Pedro II, monarch of Brazil at the time. The theatre was inaugurated in 1871, and received the name of Teatro Imperial D. Pedro II in 1875.

In 1890, after the proclamation of the Republic of Brazil, the theatre was renamed Theatro Lyrico. The building was demolished in 1934.
