= Antônio Carlos Gomes =

Brazilian composer (1836–1896)

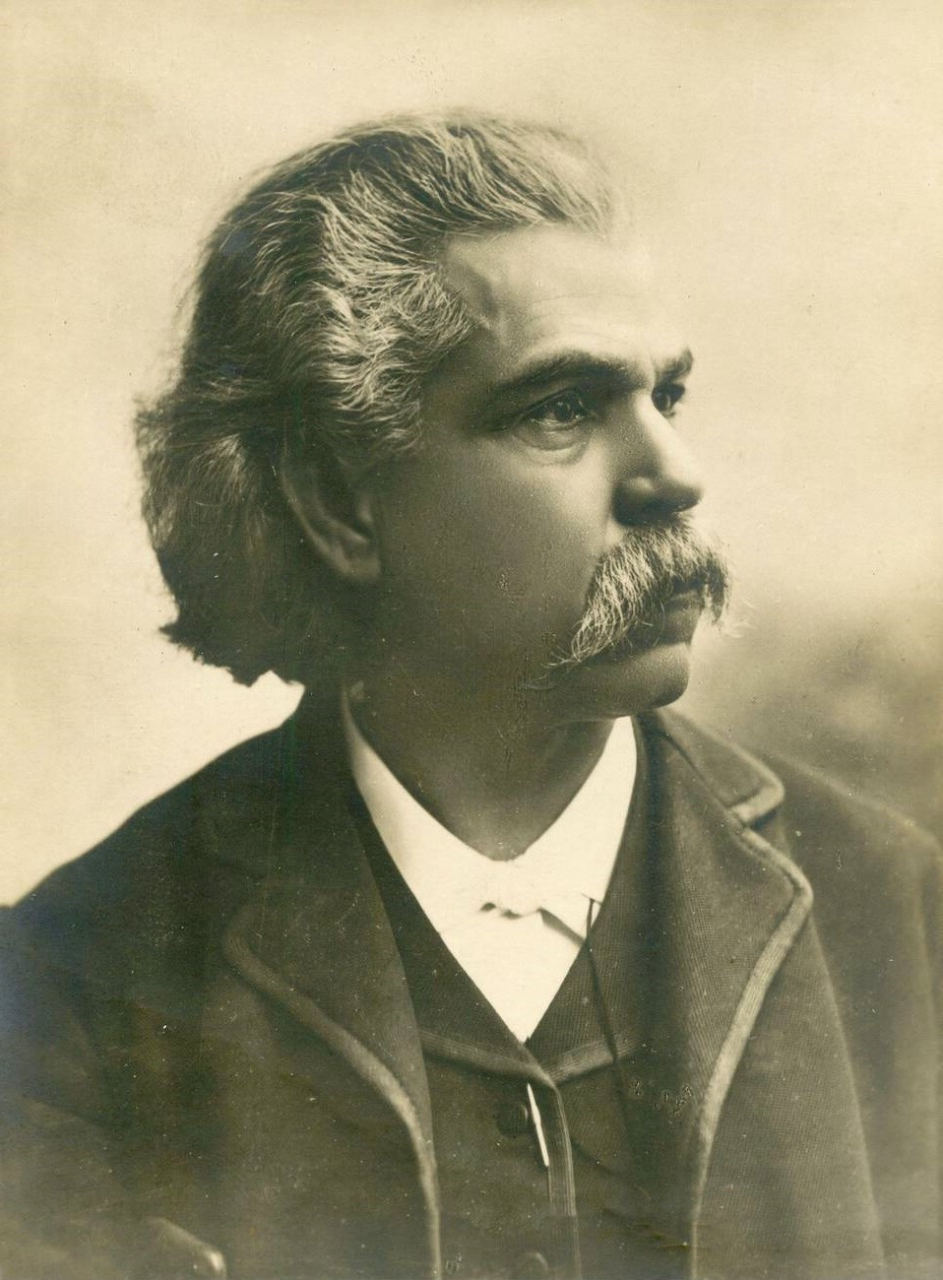
- Gomes in 1886
- Born: 11 July 1836; Campinas, São Paulo, Empire of Brazil
- Died: 16 September 1896 (aged 60); Belém, Pará, Brazilian Republic
- Occupation: Composer

Antônio Carlos Gomes (Brazilian Portuguese: [ɐ̃ˈtoni.u ˈkaʁluz ˈɡomis, ɐ̃ˈtonju -]; 11 July 1836 in Campinas – 16 September 1896 in Belém) was a Brazilian composer notable for being the first New World composer whose work was accepted by Europe. He was the only non-European who was successful as an opera composer in Italy, during the "golden age of opera" contemporary to Verdi and Puccini, and the first composer of non-European lineage to be accepted into the classic tradition of music.

Younger than Verdi, yet older than Puccini, Carlos Gomes achieved his first major success in a time when the Italian audiences were eager for a new name to celebrate and Puccini had not yet officially started his career. After the successful premiere of Il Guarany, Gomes was considered the most promising new composer. Verdi said his work was an expression of "true musical genius". Liszt said that “it displays dense technical maturity, full of harmonic and orchestral maturity.”

== Life ==
Il Guarany
Overture to Il Guarany.

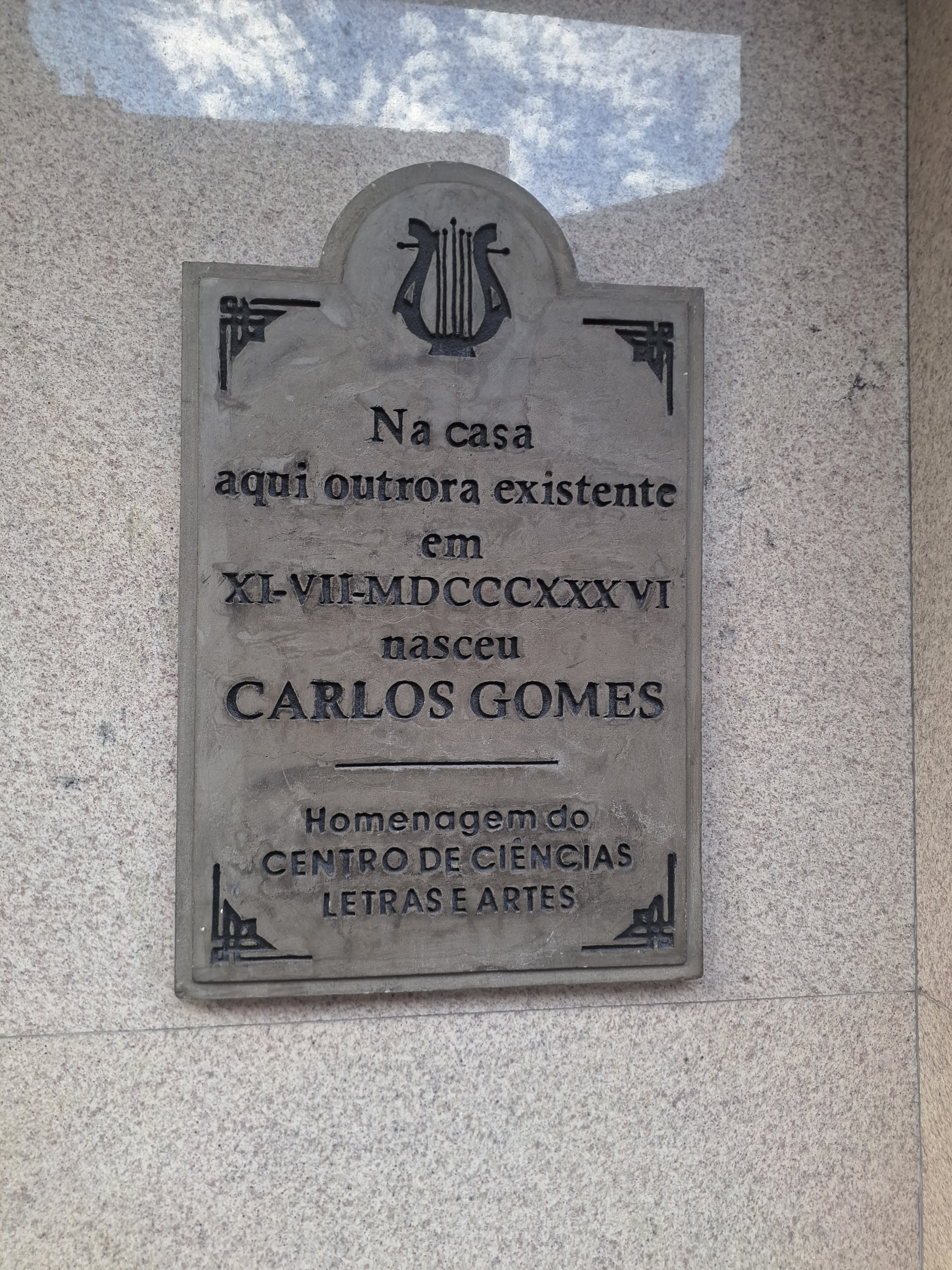
Plaque honoring the conductor at his former residence, in Campinas

He was born on 11 July 1836 in Campinas, São Paulo Province, son of Maestro Manuel José Gomes and Fabiana Maria Jaguari Cardoso.

His childhood's musical tendencies were soon stimulated by his father and by his older brother, José Pedro de Sant'Ana Gomes, also a conductor. José Pedro was the most dedicated guide and adviser in his brother's artistic career. He convinced Antônio to visit the Court where he became a protégé of Emperor Dom Pedro II, who, being notoriously interested in the careers of Brazilian artists and intellectuals, made it possible for Antônio Carlos to study at the Musical Conservatory of Rio de Janeiro.

After having graduated with honours, Carlos produced his first opera, A noite do castelo (September 1861), which was a big success. Two years later, he scored an even bigger success with his second opera, Joanna de Flandres, which was considered superior to the first. Mysteriously however, Joanna de Flandres was shelved after its original run and not performed again until the 21st Century (it was even believed to be lost for a time). These two pieces convinced the Emperor to give him a Royal scholarship to study in Italy in 1864. He studied in Milan at the local conservatory with Lauro Rossi and Alberto Mazzucato and completed in three years a course which was normally completed in four years, obtaining the title of Maestro Composer.

Interested in composing an opera which dealt with a truly Brazilian subject, Carlos Gomes chose as the theme of his next work the novel O Guarani, by Brazilian writer José de Alencar. The opera premiered in May 1870 at the La Scala Theater in Milan as Il Guarany.

The success was enormous. Even the most strict musical critics compared the Brazilian musician to the great European maestros, such as Rossini and Verdi (Verdi himself was present at the premiere and later told Gomes backstage that he would be his successor). The King of Italy, Victor Emmanuel II, even decorated Gomes; after which, the opera was presented in all major European capitals. Before that year was over, Gomes returned to Brazil, where he organized the premiere of Il Guarany in Rio de Janeiro. The piece achieved the same success Gomes had seen in Italy.

Returning to Italy, Carlos Gomes married Adelina Peri, an Italian pianist he had met while studying in Milan.

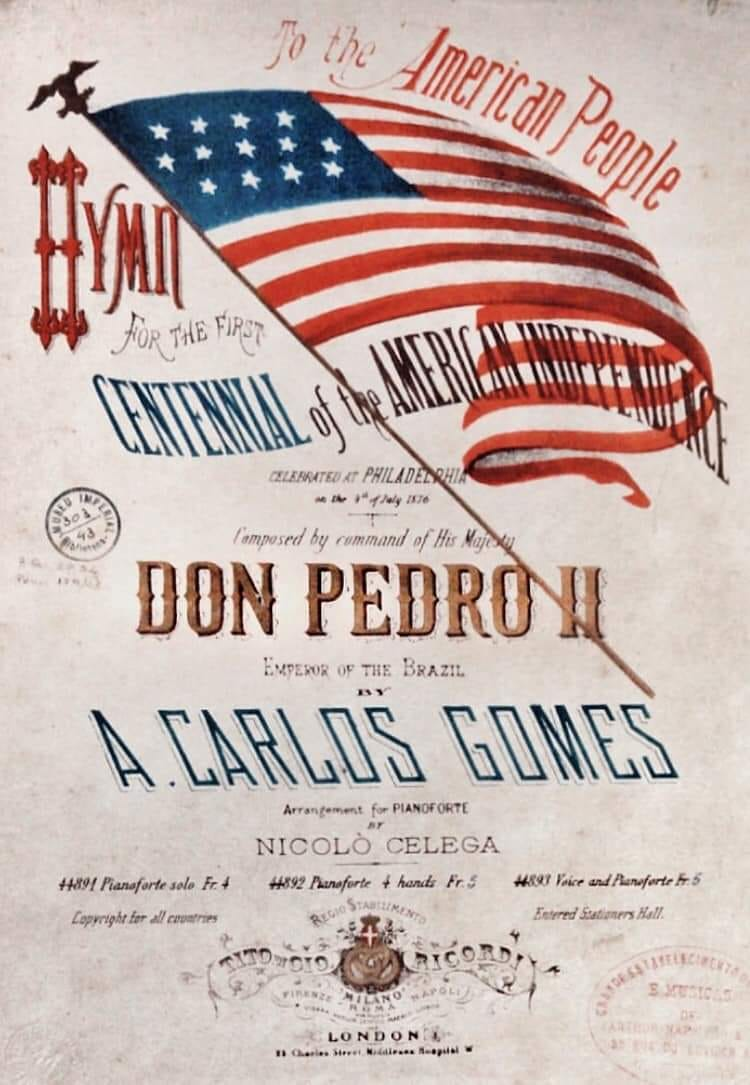
Cover of Carlos Gomes’s hymn for the 1876 U.S. Centennial.

In 1876, at the request of Emperor Dom Pedro II, Carlos Gomes composed the Hymn for the First Centennial of the American Independence (also known as Saluto del Brasile), written especially for the celebrations of the centennial of the United States’ independence. The work was performed during the Centennial Exposition on July 4 of that year, and again in New York on July 9. The emperor, who attended the ceremony and presented U.S. President Ulysses S. Grant with a copy of the score, recorded in his diary that the performance received little attention due to the noise and distance from the audience (the performance took place at a fair). The original handwritten score is now part of the Carlos Gomes Collection at the Imperial Museum in Petrópolis.

In 1883 Gomes traveled to Brazil, receiving homages in every city he visited. When he returned to Italy, he dedicated himself to the composition of an opera themed against slavery, inspired by the liberation struggles of black slaves in Brazil, which got the title of Lo schiavo. The composition, which had been suggested by a great friend of Antônio's, a black engineer named André Rebouças, only debuted several years later in 1889 with its theme changed from 19th Century black slavery to 17th Century Indigenous slavery (due to censors who thought that the work was too controversial in its original form).

When the Brazilian republic was proclaimed in 1889, Carlos Gomes, who at this time was in Campinas, sailed once more to Italy. Faithful to the Brazilian monarchy and Dom Pedro II, Gomes refused the opportunity given to him by president Deodoro da Fonseca to compose the new Brazilian National Anthem. In the following years, he composed the opera Condor and the cantata Colombo, for the Columbus Festival (12 October 1892), in celebration of the fourth centenary of the discovery of America.

Invited by the governor of the Brazilian province of Pará to direct the Musical Conservatory, the maestro traveled to the capital Belém, willing to take the position. However, shortly after arriving, Carlos Gomes, by then an elderly man in poor health, died at 22:20 BRT on 16 September 1896. Besides his eight operas, he composed songs (3 books), choruses, and piano pieces.

Studies have discussed how the public image of Carlos Gomes was historically presented as that of a white man, despite references to his mixed-race background and experiences of racial prejudice in 19th-century Brazil. Scholars link this portrayal to visual and narrative standards of the period, such as studio photography and the monumentalization of the composer, which contributed to a “whitened” social memory. The debate relates Gomes’s case to figures like Machado de Assis and Castro Alves and to broader discussions of scientific racism and memory politics in Brazil. Recent perspectives emphasize that recognizing his racial background enriches the understanding of his artistic path and inspires new interpretations, such as educational projects in Campinas and the upcoming biopic Bravo! Carlos Gomes do Brasil, starring tenor Jean William.

== Operas ==
See List of works for the stage by Antônio Carlos Gomes

== Gallery ==
Many honours were given to conductor Carlos Gomes throughout Brazil and abroad where he ruled and made fame.

Maestro Carlos Gomes

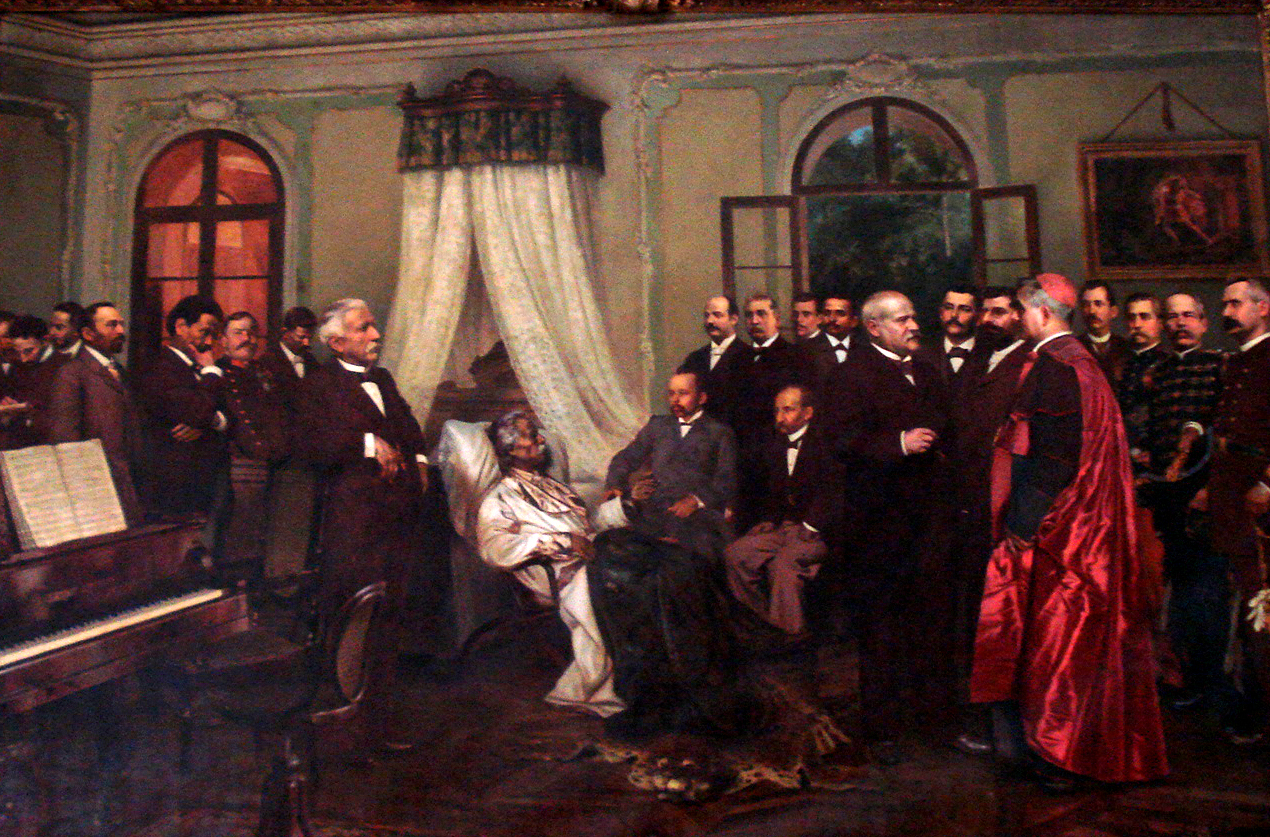
Last days of Carlos Gomes.

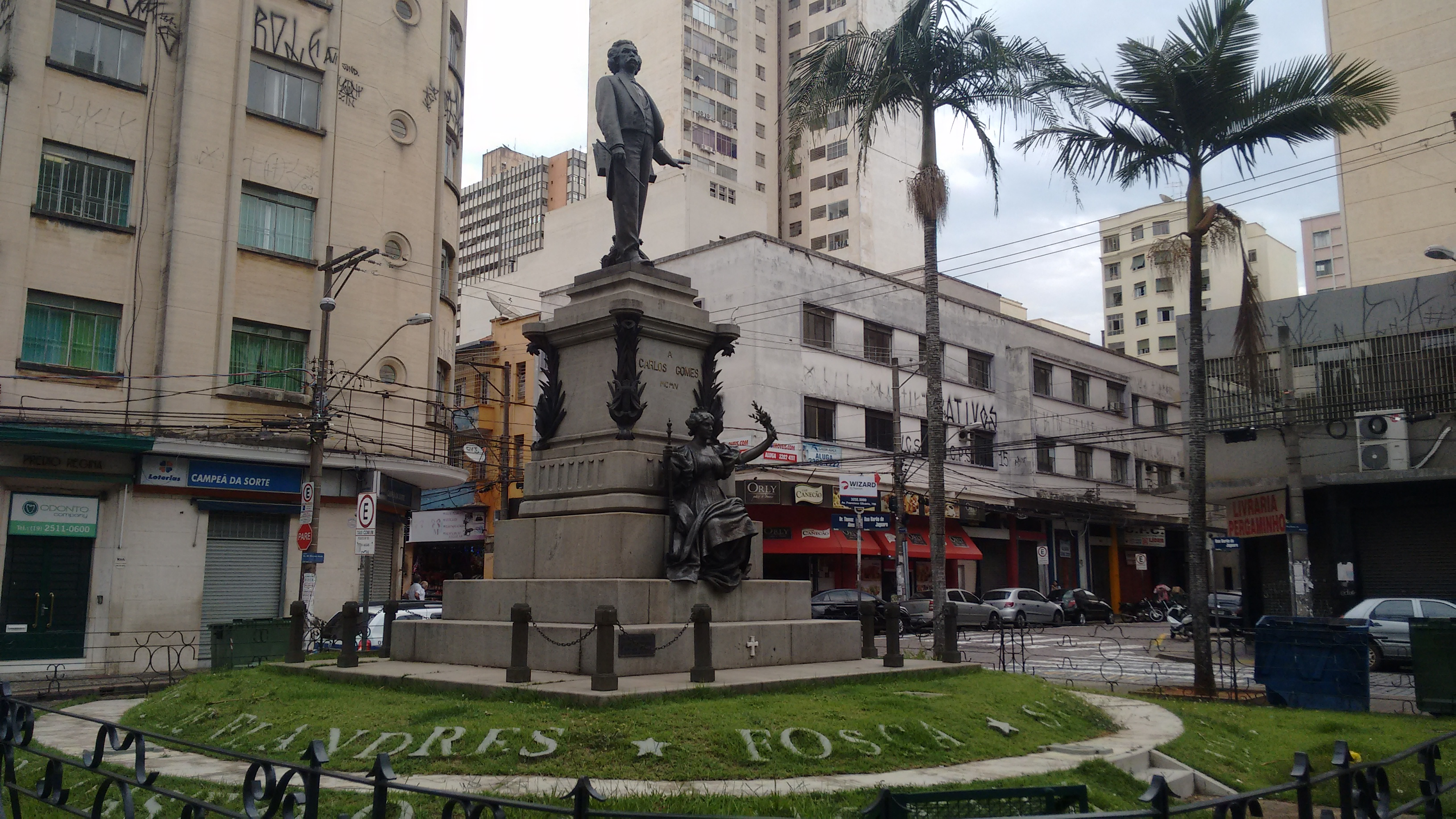
Gomes's tomb located at Bento Quirino Square, on his hometown, Campinas.

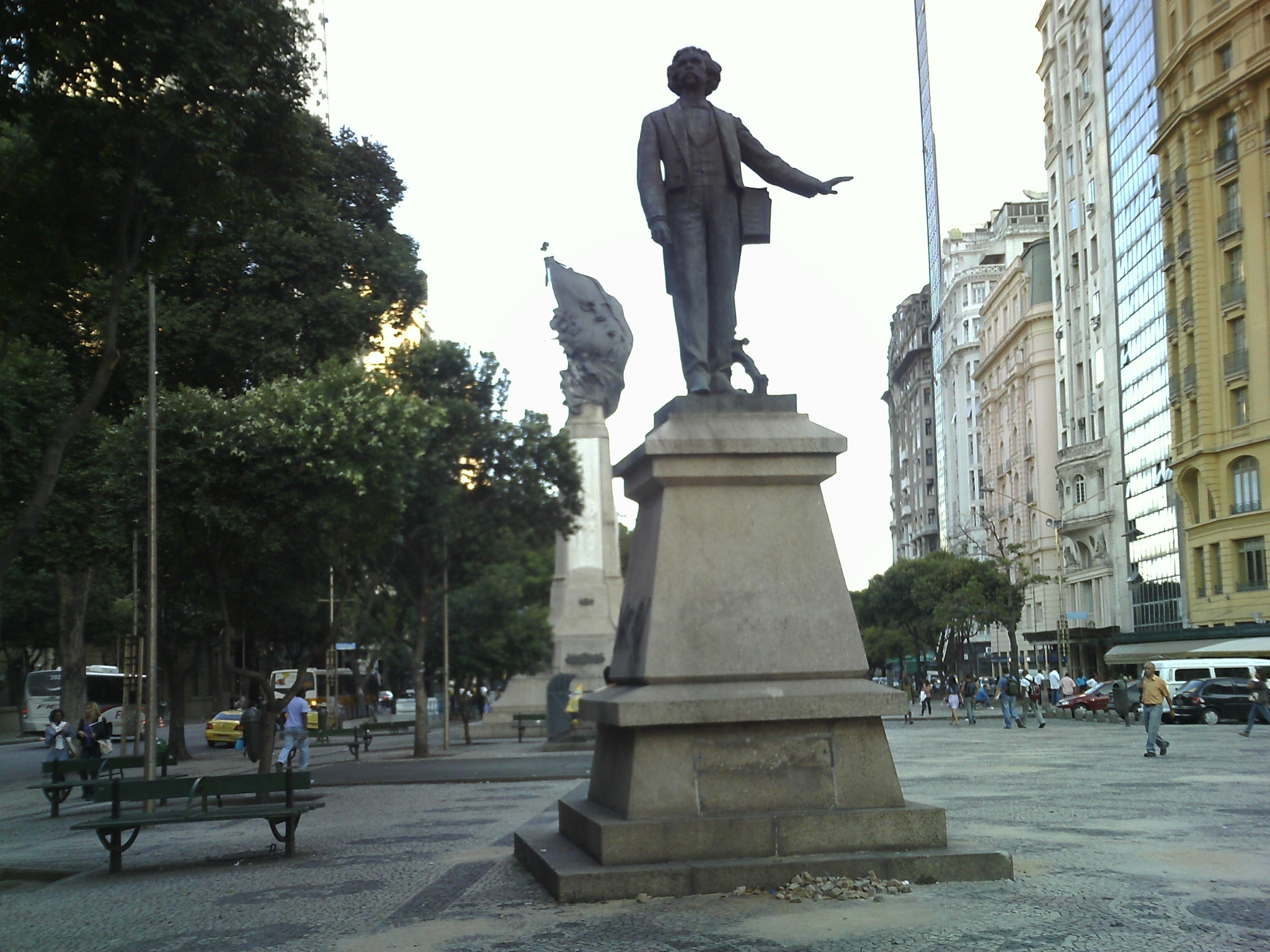
Statue of Carlos Gomes in Cinelândia, downtown Rio de Janeiro

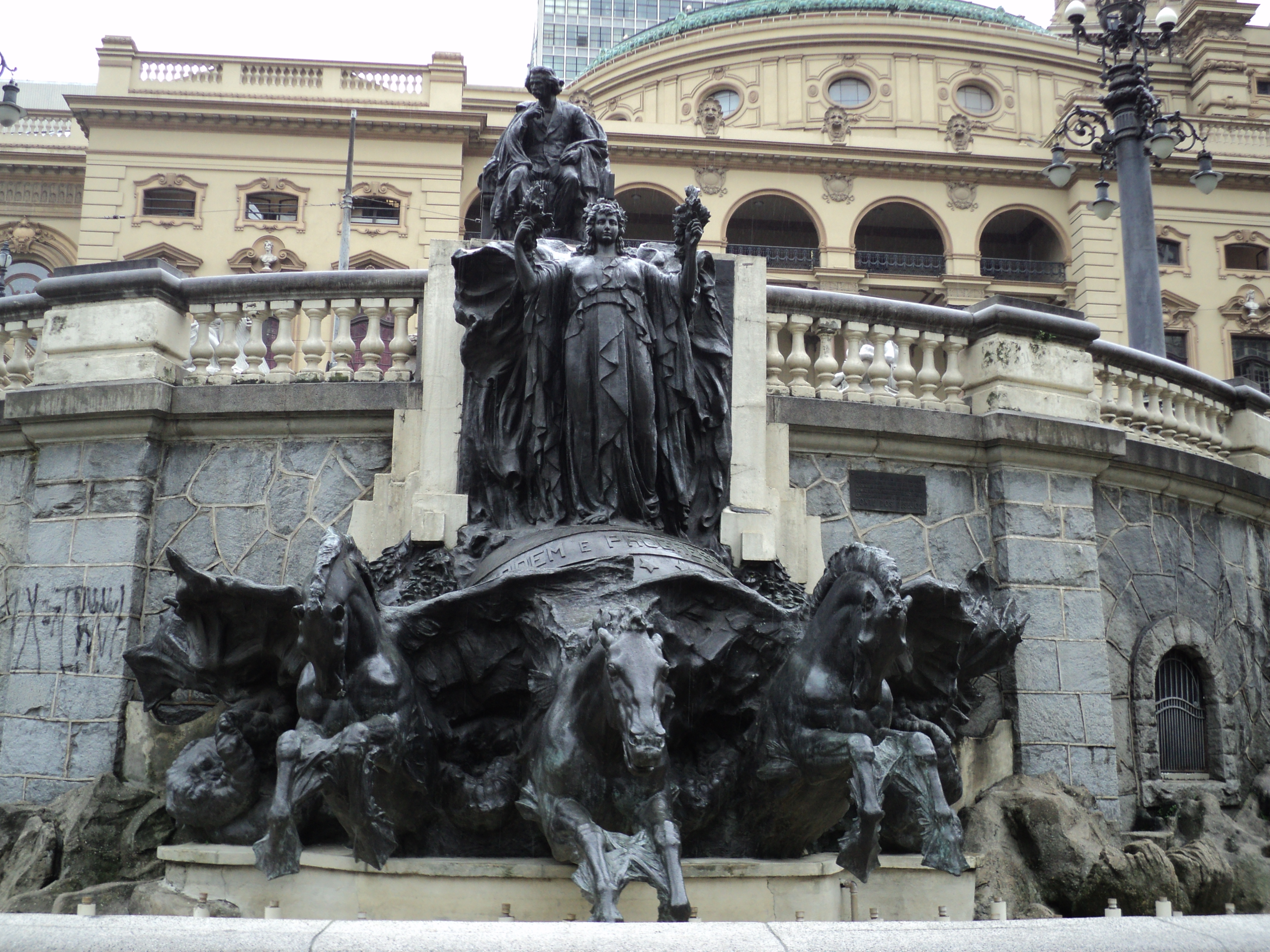
Monument to Carlos Gomes in front of the São Paulo Municipal Theatre.

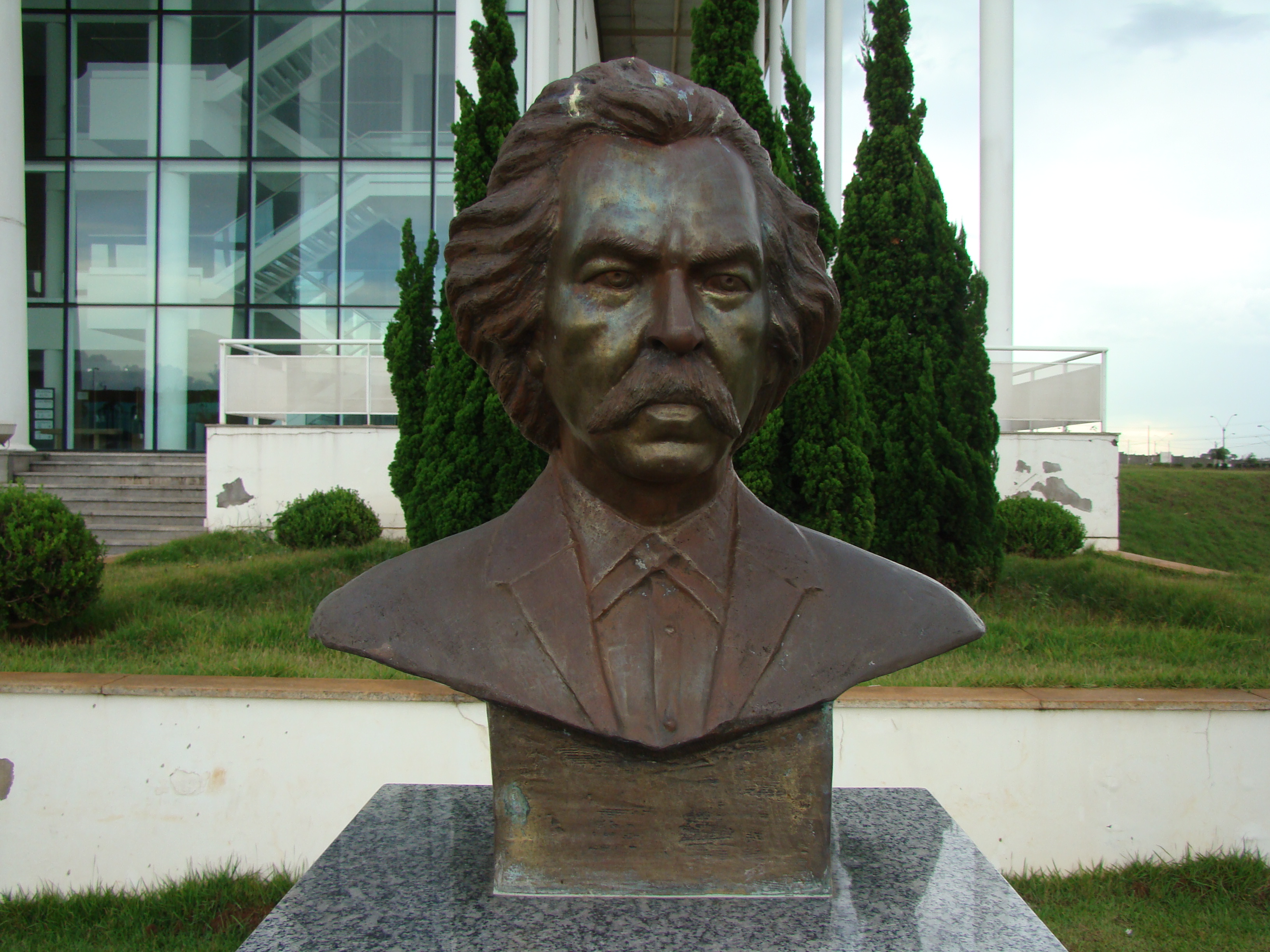
Bust of Carlos Gomes in front of the Municipal Theatre of Paulinia.

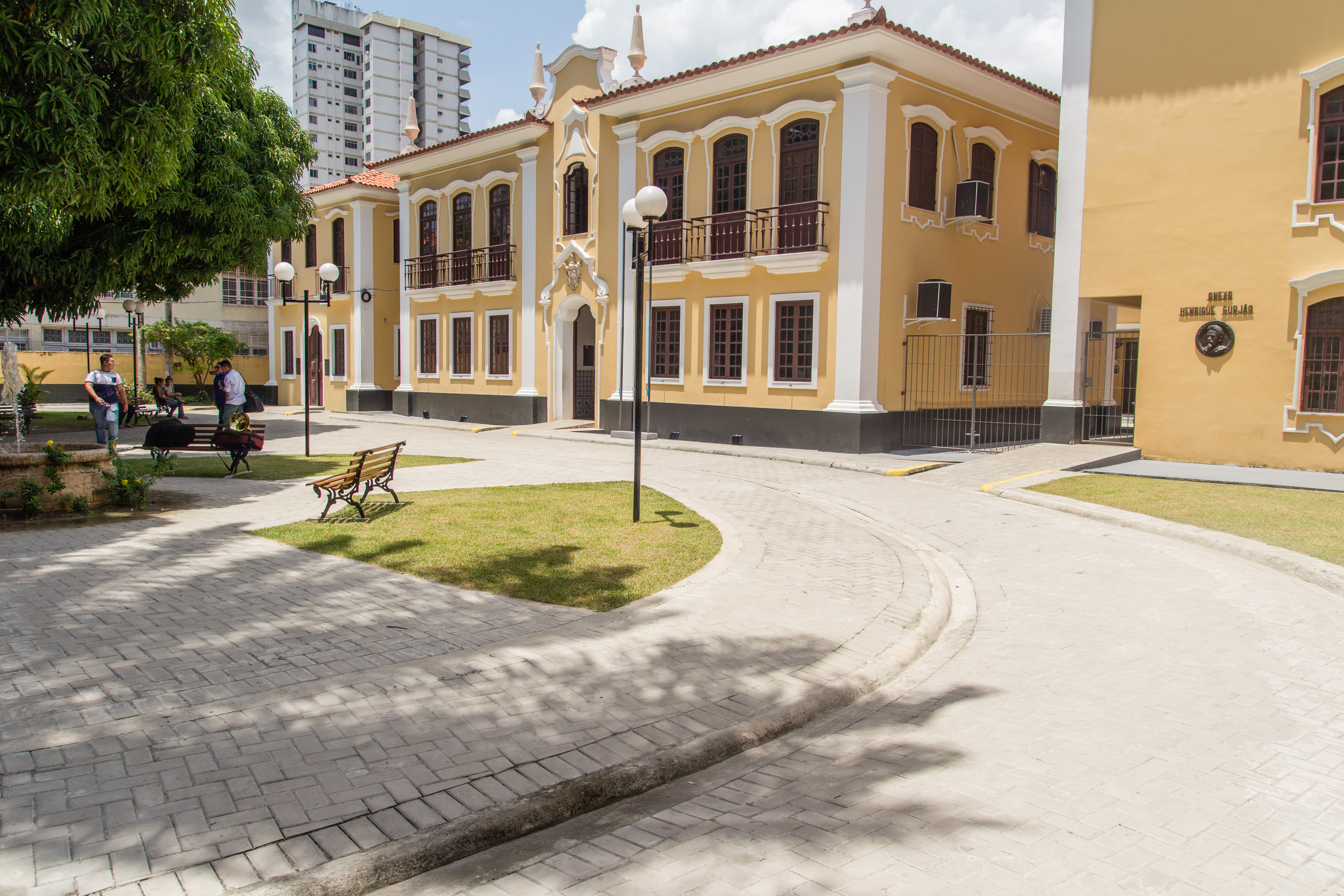
Carlos Gomes State Institute Building, the conservatory that bears his name, in Belém.

== Bibliography ==
- Góes, Marcus: Carlos Gomes – A Força Indômita; Secult, Pará, 1996
- Kaufman: Annals of Italian Opera: Verdi and his Major Contemporaries; Garland Publishing, New York and London, 1990. (contains premiere casts and performance histories of the operas by Gomes)
- Vetro, Gaspare Nello: Antônio Carlos Gomes; Nuove Edizione, Milano, 1977
- Vetro, Gaspare Nello: Antônio Carlos Gomes Il Guarany, Parma, 1996
- Vetro, Gaspare Nello: A. Carlos Gomes Carteggi Italiani, Parma, 2002
- Baker's Biographical Dictionary of Musicians, 8th ed., s.v. "Antonio Carlos Gomes."
