= List of Tranmere Rovers F.C. seasons =

Tranmere Rovers Football Club is an English professional association football club founded in 1884, and based in Birkenhead, Wirral. Originally known as Belmont Football Club, they adopted their current name in 1885. They were a founder member of Division Three North in 1921, and were a member of The Football League until 2015, when they were relegated to the National League, the fifth tier of English football. They returned to the Football League in 2018 after defeating Boreham Wood 2-1 in the National League play-off final.

== Key ==
Key to league record

- Year shown in bold when linked to club season article
- Level = Level of the league in the current league system
- Pld = Games played
- W = Games won
- D = Games drawn
- L = Games lost
- GF = Goals for
- GA = Goals against
- GD = Goals difference
- Pts = Points
- Position = Position in the final league table
- Top scorer and number of goals scored shown in bold when he was also top scorer for the division. Number of goals includes goals scored in play-offs.

Key to cup records

- Res = Final reached round
- Rec = Final club record in the form of wins-draws-losses
- PR = Preliminary round
- QR1 (2, etc.) = Qualifying Cup rounds
- G = Group stage
- R1 (2, etc.) = Proper Cup rounds
- QF = Quarter-finalists
- SF = Semi-finalists
- F = Finalists
- A (QF, SF, F) = Area quarter-, semi-, finalists
- W = Winners

== Seasons ==
Year	League	Lvl	Pld	W	D	L	GF	GA	GD	Pts	Position	Leading league scorer		FA Cup		EFL Cup		FL Trophy FA Trophy		Average home attendance (Note: Average home attendance = for league games only)
Year	League	Lvl	Pld	W	D	L	GF	GA	GD	Pts	Position	Name	Goals	Res	Rec	Res	Rec	Res	Rec	Average home attendance
1891–92														QR1	0-0-1					
1892–93	**Lancashire Combination**		20	4	1	15	30	81	-51	9	**11th of 11**			QR1	0-0-1					
1893–94	**Lancashire Combination**		16	6	2	8	29	53	-24	14	**4th of 9**			QR2	0-0-1					
1894–95	Club left the Lancashire Combination after the 1894–95 season and didn't participate in other league competitions for three seasons.													PR	0-0-1					
1895–96	Club left the Lancashire Combination after the 1894–95 season and didn't participate in other league competitions for three seasons.													PR	0-0-1					
1896–97	Club left the Lancashire Combination after the 1894–95 season and didn't participate in other league competitions for three seasons.													QR2	1-0-1					
1897–98	**The Combination**		24	9	3	12	35	45	-10	19	**12th of 13**									
1898–99	**The Combination**		28	15	4	9	54	33	+21	34	**3rd of 15**									
1899–1900	Club left The Combination after 1898–99 season and didn't participate in other league competitions for one season.													QR1	0-0-1					
1900–01	**The Combination**		22	6	5	11	32	37	-5	17	**8th of 12**			QR1	0-0-1					
1901–02	**The Combination**		26	8	7	11	46	49	-3	23	**10th of 14**									
1902–03	**The Combination**		26	4	5	17	30	64	-34	13	**13th of 14**									
1903–04	**The Combination**		24	14	1	9	54	42	+12	29	**4th of 13**			QR3	1-1-1					
1904–05	**The Combination**		26	10	7	9	41	37	+4	27	**6th of 14**			QR2	0-0-1					
1905–06	**The Combination**		28	13	8	7	40	36	+4	32	**5th of 15**			QR1	0-1-1					
1906–07	**The Combination**		26	10	5	11	35	39	-4	25	**8th of 14**			QR1	0-0-1					
1907–08	**The Combination**		26	20	4	2	83	21	+62	44	**1st of 14**			QR2	2-0-1					
1908–09	**The Combination**		30	15	5	10	86	48	+38	35	**3rd of 16**									
1909–10	**The Combination**		30	18	2	10	92	50	+42	38	**4th of 16**			QR3	3-0-1					
Joined the Lancashire Combination.
1910–11	**Lancashire Combination**; **Division Two**		38	14	6	18	60	69	-9	34	**13th of 20**			PR	0-0-1					
1911–12	**Lancashire Combination**; **Division Two**		30	18	6	6	83	41	+42	42	**3rd of 16**; Promoted									
1912–13	**Lancashire Combination**; **Division One**		34	16	6	12	92	58	+34	38	**6th of 18**			QR1	1-0-1					
1913–14	**Lancashire Combination**; **Division One**		34	25	4	5	85	32	+53	54	**1st of 18**			QR1	1-0-1					
1914–15	**Lancashire Combination**; **Division One**		32	19	3	10	84	52	+32	41	**3rd of 17**			QR3	3-2-1					
No competitive football was played between 1915 and 1919 due to the World War I. Joined newly created the Cheshire County League, but resigned during the season to join the Central League.
1919–20	**Central League**		42	23	5	14	103	61	+42	51	**4th of 22**			QR1	0-0-1					
1920–21	**Central League**		42	21	7	14	87	63	+24	49	**7th of 22**			QR5	1-0-1					
Football League Third Division North created. The club were invited to join.
**1921–22**	**Football League**; **Third Division**; **North**	3	38	9	11	18	51	61	-10	29	**18th of 20**	Frederick Groves	7	QR4	0-1-1					6,525
**1922–23**	**Football League**; **Third Division**; **North**	3	38	12	8	18	49	59	-10	32	**16th of 20**			QR4	0-0-1					5,655
**1923–24**	**Football League**; **Third Division**; **North**	3	42	13	15	14	51	60	-9	41	**12th of 22**			QR6	2-1-1					7,280
**1924–25**	**Football League**; **Third Division**; **North**	3	42	14	4	24	59	78	-19	32	**21st of 22**			QR4	1-2-1					5,475
**1925–26**	**Football League**; **Third Division**; **North**	3	42	19	6	17	73	83	-10	44	**7th of 22**			R1	0-1-1					6,653
**1926–27**	**Football League**; **Third Division**; **North**	3	42	19	8	15	85	67	+18	46	**9th of 22**			R1	0-1-1					6,668
**1927–28**	**Football League**; **Third Division**; **North**	3	42	22	9	11	105	72	+33	53	**5th of 22**			R3	2-0-1					5,893
**1928–29**	**Football League**; **Third Division**; **North**	3	42	22	3	17	79	77	+2	47	**7th of 22**			R2	1-0-1					5,125
**1929–30**	**Football League**; **Third Division**; **North**	3	42	16	9	17	83	86	-3	41	**12th of 22**			R1	0-1-1					4,632
**1930–31**	**Football League**; **Third Division**; **North**	3	42	24	6	12	111	74	+37	54	**4th of 22**			R1	0-1-1					7,358
**1931–32**	**Football League**; **Third Division**; **North**	3	40	19	11	10	107	58	+49	50	**4th of 21**			R3	2-1-1					5,856
**1932–33**	**Football League**; **Third Division**; **North**	3	42	17	8	17	70	66	+4	42	**11th of 22**			R4	3-2-1					4,200
**1933–34**	**Football League**; **Third Division**; **North**	3	42	20	7	15	84	63	+21	47	**7th of 22**			R4	3-1-1					4,926
**1934–35**	**Football League**; **Third Division**; **North**	3	42	20	11	11	74	55	+19	51	**6th of 22**			R2	1-0-1					7,362
**1935–36**	**Football League**; **Third Division**; **North**	3	42	22	11	9	93	58	+35	55	**3rd of 22**	**Bunny Bell**	36	R4	3-1-1					8,872
**1936–37**	**Football League**; **Third Division**; **North**	3	42	12	9	21	71	88	-17	33	**19th of 22**			R1	0-0-1					5,999
**1937–38**	**Football League**; **Third Division**; **North**	3	42	23	10	9	81	41	+40	56	**1st of 22**; Promoted			R3	2-0-1					9,584
**1938–39**	**Football League**; **Second Division**	2	42	6	5	31	39	99	-60	17	**22nd of 22**; Relegated			R3	0-0-1					9,938
No competitive football was played between 1939 and 1946 due to the World War II.
**1945–46**														R2	2-1-1					
**1946–47**	**Football League**; **Third Division**; **North**	3	42	17	7	18	66	77	-11	41	**10th of 22**			R1	0-0-1					8,076
**1947–48**	**Football League**; **Third Division**; **North**	3	42	16	4	22	54	72	-18	36	**18th of 22**			R2	1-0-1					8,862
**1948–49**	**Football League**; **Third Division**; **North**	3	42	13	15	14	46	57	-11	41	**11th of 22**			R1	0-0-1					8,298
**1949–50**	**Football League**; **Third Division**; **North**	3	42	19	11	12	51	48	+3	49	**5th of 22**			R2	1-0-1					9,026
**1950–51**	**Football League**; **Third Division**; **North**	3	46	24	11	11	83	62	+21	59	**4th of 24**			R2	1-0-1					9,869
**1951–52**	**Football League**; **Third Division**; **North**	3	46	21	6	19	76	71	+5	48	**11th of 24**			R4	3-2-1					7,568
**1952–53**	**Football League**; **Third Division**; **North**	3	46	21	5	20	65	63	+2	47	**13th of 24**			R3	2-1-1					7,798
**1953–54**	**Football League**; **Third Division**; **North**	3	46	18	7	21	59	70	-11	43	**14th of 24**			R3	2-2-1					6,212
**1954–55**	**Football League**; **Third Division**; **North**	3	46	13	11	22	55	70	-15	37	**19th of 24**			R1	0-1-1					5,374
**1955–56**	**Football League**; **Third Division**; **North**	3	46	16	9	21	59	84	-25	41	**16th of 24**			R2	1-0-1					6,500
**1956–57**	**Football League**; **Third Division**; **North**	3	46	7	13	26	51	91	-40	27	**23rd of 24**			R1	0-0-1					6,061
**1957–58**	**Football League**; **Third Division**; **North**	3	46	18	10	18	82	76	+6	46	**11th of 24**			R3	2-0-1					10,373
Regional Third divisions merged creating nationwide Third Division and Fourth Division. Club qualified to join Third Division.
**1958–59**	**Football League**; **Third Division**	3	46	21	8	17	82	67	+15	50	**7th of 24**			R2	1-0-1					11,815
**1959–60**	**Football League**; **Third Division**	3	46	14	13	19	72	75	-3	41	**20th of 24**			R1	0-0-1					9,965
**1960–61**	**Football League**; **Third Division**	3	46	15	8	23	79	115	-36	38	**21st of 24**; Relegated			R2	1-1-1	R4	2-0-1			9,460
**1961–62**	**Football League**; **Fourth Division**	4	44	20	4	20	70	81	-11	44	**15th of 23**			R1	0-0-1	R1	0-0-1			8,079
**1962–63**	**Football League**; **Fourth Division**	4	46	20	10	16	81	67	+14	50	**8th of 24**			R3	2-1-1	R1	0-0-1			7,614
**1963–64**	**Football League**; **Fourth Division**	4	46	20	11	15	85	73	+12	51	**7th of 24**			R1	0-0-1	R3	2-0-1			7,072
**1964–65**	**Football League**; **Fourth Division**	4	46	27	6	13	99	56	+43	60	**5th of 24**			R1	0-1-1	R2	1-0-1			11,656
**1965–66**	**Football League**; **Fourth Division**	4	46	24	8	14	93	66	+27	56	**5th of 24**			R1	0-0-1	R1	0-0-1			8,031
**1966–67**	**Football League**; **Fourth Division**	4	46	22	14	10	66	43	+23	58	**4th of 24**; Promoted	George Yardley	15	R2	1-1-1	R2	1-1-1			7,839
**1967–68**	**Football League**; **Third Division**	3	46	14	12	20	62	74	-12	40	**19th of 24**			R5	4-1-1	R2	1-0-1			7,403
**1968–69**	**Football League**; **Third Division**	3	46	19	10	17	70	68	+2	48	**7th of 24**			R1	0-0-1	R2	1-3-1			6,040
**1969–70**	**Football League**; **Third Division**	3	46	14	16	16	56	72	-16	44	**16th of 24**			R4	3-2-1	R3	2-0-1			4,394
**1970–71**	**Football League**; **Third Division**	3	46	10	22	14	45	55	-10	42	**18th of 24**			R1	0-2-1	R2	1-2-1			3,949
**1971–72**	**Football League**; **Third Division**	3	46	10	16	20	50	71	-21	36	**20th of 24**			R4	3-3-1	R2	1-1-1			4,355
**1972–73**	**Football League**; **Third Division**	3	46	15	16	15	56	52	+4	46	**10th of 24**			R2	1-0-1	R1	0-0-1			5,615
**1973–74**	**Football League**; **Third Division**	3	46	15	15	16	50	44	+6	45	**16th of 24**			R2	1-0-1	R3	2-2-1			4,215
**1974–75**	**Football League**; **Third Division**	3	46	14	9	23	55	57	-2	37	**22nd of 24**; Relegated			R3	2-1-1	R2	1-1-1			2,803
**1975–76**	**Football League**; **Fourth Division**	4	46	24	10	12	89	55	34	58	**4th of 24**; Promoted	**Ronnie Moore**	34	R1	0-0-1	R1	1-0-2			3,880
**1976–77**	**Football League**; **Third Division**	3	46	13	17	16	51	53	-2	43	**14th of 24**			R1	0-0-1	R2	1-0-2			3,251
**1977–78**	**Football League**; **Third Division**	3	46	16	15	15	57	52	+5	47	**12th of 24**			R1	0-1-1	R1	0-1-1			3,926
**1978–79**	**Football League**; **Third Division**	3	46	6	16	24	45	78	-33	28	**23rd of 24**; Relegated			R2	1-1-1	R1	0-1-1			2,179
**1979–80**	**Football League**; **Fourth Division**	4	46	14	13	19	50	56	-6	41	**15th of 24**			R2	1-1-1	R2	2-1-1			2,246
**1980–81**	**Football League**; **Fourth Division**	4	46	13	10	23	59	73	-24	36	**21st of 24**			R2	1-1-1	R2	1-0-3			1,901
**1981–82**	**Football League**; **Fourth Division**	4	46	14	18	14	51	56	-5	60	**11th of 24**			R1	0-1-1	R4	4-1-1			1,735
**1982–83**	**Football League**; **Fourth Division**	4	46	13	11	22	49	71	-22	50	**19th of 24**			R3	2-1-1	R2	0-2-2			1,921
**1983–84**	**Football League**; **Fourth Division**	4	46	17	15	14	53	53	0	66	**10th of 24**			R1	0-1-1	R1	0-1-1	AF	3-1-1	2,138
**1984–85**	**Football League**; **Fourth Division**	4	46	24	3	19	83	66	+17	75	**6th of 24**	**John Clayton**	31	R2	1-1-1	R1	0-1-1	AQF	1-1-2	1,595
**1985–86**	**Football League**; **Fourth Division**	4	46	15	9	22	74	73	+1	54	**19th of 24**			R2	1-2-1	R1	0-1-1	AQF	2-0-1	1,566
**1986–87**	**Football League**; **Fourth Division**	4	46	11	17	18	54	72	-18	50	**20th of 24**			R2	1-0-1	R1	0-1-1	G	0-0-2	2,126
**1987–88**	**Football League**; **Fourth Division**	4	46	19	9	18	61	53	+8	64	**14th of 24**			R1	0-1-1	R1	1-0-1	G	0-1-1	3,322
**1988–89**	**Football League**; **Fourth Division**	4	46	21	17	8	62	43	+19	80	**2nd of 24**; Promoted			R3	2-2-1	R4	3-2-1	R1	1-1-1	5,331
**1989–90**	**Football League**; **Third Division**	3	46	23	11	12	86	49	+37	80	**4th of 24**			R1	0-0-1	R4	5-1-1	W	7-1-0	7,449
**1989–90**	**Football League**; **Third Division**	3	Lost in the play-off final.											R1	0-0-1	R4	5-1-1	W	7-1-0	7,449
**1990–91**	**Football League**; **Third Division**	3	46	23	9	14	64	46	+18	78	**5th of 24**			R2	1-0-1	R1	0-1-1	F	5-0-3	6,740
**1990–91**	**Football League**; **Third Division**	3	Promoted after winning the play-offs.											R2	1-0-1	R1	0-1-1	F	5-0-3	6,740
**1991–92**	**Football League**; **Second Division**	2	46	14	19	13	56	56	0	61	**14th of 24**	John Aldridge	22	R3	2-1-1	R3	3-1-1			8,845
Football League divisions renamed after the Premier League creation.
**1992–93**	**Football League**; **First Division**	2	46	23	10	13	72	56	+16	79	**4th of 24**			R4	1-0-1	R1	1-0-1			8,071
**1992–93**	**Football League**; **First Division**	2	Lost in the play-off semifinal.											R4	1-0-1	R1	1-0-1			8,071
**1993–94**	**Football League**; **First Division**	2	46	21	9	16	69	53	+16	72	**5th of 24**			R3	0-0-1	SF	5-2-1			8,099
**1993–94**	**Football League**; **First Division**	2	Lost in the play-off semifinal.											R3	0-0-1	SF	5-2-1			8,099
**1994–95**	**Football League**; **First Division**	2	46	22	10	14	67	58	+9	76	**5th of 24**	**John Aldridge**	24	R4	1-1-1	R3	1-2-1			8,906
**1994–95**	**Football League**; **First Division**	2	Lost in the play-off semifinal.											R4	1-1-1	R3	1-2-1			8,906
**1995–96**	**Football League**; **First Division**	2	46	14	17	15	64	60	+4	59	**13th of 24**	**John Aldridge**	27	R3	0-0-1	R3	2-1-1			7,861
**1996–97**	**Football League**; **First Division**	2	46	17	14	15	63	56	+7	65	**11th of 24**	John Aldridge	18	R3	0-0-1	R2	1-2-1			8,127
**1997–98**	**Football League**; **First Division**	2	46	14	14	18	54	57	-3	56	**14th of 24**	David Kelly	11	R5	2-0-1	R3	2-1-2			7,999
**1998–99**	**Football League**; **First Division**	2	46	12	20	14	63	63	+2	56	**15th of 24**	Kenny Irons	15	R3	0-0-1	R3	3-0-2			6,930
**1999–2000**	**Football League**; **First Division**	2	46	15	12	19	57	68	-11	57	**13th of 24**	Wayne Allison	16	QF	3-0-1	F	7-0-3			7,273
**2000–01**	**Football League**; **First Division**	2	46	9	11	26	46	77	-31	38	**24th of 24**; Relegated	Jason Koumas	10	QF	3-1-1	R4	4-2-0			9,049
**2001–02**	**Football League**; **Second Division**	3	46	16	15	15	63	60	+3	63	**12th of 24**	Stuart Barlow	14	R5	4-0-1	R3	2-0-1	R2	0-0-1	8,577
**2002–03**	**Football League**; **Second Division**	3	46	23	11	12	66	57	+9	80	**7th of 24**	Simon Haworth	20	R1	0-1-1	R2	1-0-1	AQF	2-0-1	7,869
**2003–04**	**Football League**; **Second Division**	3	46	17	16	13	59	56	+3	67	**8th of 24**	Eugène Dadi	16	QF	5-2-1	R2	1-1-0	R1	0-0-1	7,606
Football League divisions renamed.
**2004–05**	**Football**; **League One**	3	46	22	13	11	73	55	+18	79	**3rd of 24**	Iain Hume	15	R1	0-0-1	R2	1-0-1	ASF	2-1-0	9,044
**2004–05**	**Football**; **League One**	3	Lost in the play-off semifinal.											R1	0-0-1	R2	1-0-1	ASF	2-1-0	9,044
**2005–06**	**Football**; **League One**	3	46	13	15	18	50	52	-2	54	**18th of 24**	Chris Greenacre	15	R1	0-0-1	R1	0-0-1	AQF	2-1-0	7,211
**2006–07**	**Football**; **League One**	3	46	18	13	15	58	53	+5	67	**9th of 24**	Chris Greenacre	17	R2	1-0-1	R1	0-0-1	R2	1-0-1	6,930
**2007–08**	**Football**; **League One**	3	46	18	11	17	52	47	+5	65	**11th of 24**	Chris Greenacre	11	R3	2-1-1	R1	0-0-1	R1	0-0-1	6,504
**2008–09**	**Football**; **League One**	3	46	21	11	14	62	49	+13	74	**7th of 24**	Antony Kay	11	R2	1-2-1	R1	0-0-1	ASF	3-0-1	5,820
**2009–10**	**Football**; **League One**	3	46	14	9	23	45	72	-27	51	**19th of 24**	Ian Thomas-Moore	13	R3	2-2-1	R2	1-0-1	R2	0-0-1	5,671
**2010–11**	**Football**; **League One**	3	46	15	11	20	53	60	-7	56	**18th of 24**	Enoch Showunmi	11	R1	0-0-1	R2	1-0-1	ASF	1-2-1	5,467
**2011–12**	**Football**; **League One**	3	46	14	14	18	49	53	-4	56	**12th of 24**	Jake Cassidy; Joss Labadie; Lucas Akins	5	R1	0-0-1	R1	0-0-1	AQF	1-1-1	5,130
**2012–13**	**Football**; **League One**	3	46	19	10	17	58	48	+10	67	**11th of 24**	Jake Cassidy	11	R3	2-0-1	R2	1-0-1	R1	0-0-1	6,196
**2013–14**	**Football**; **League One**	3	46	12	11	23	52	79	-27	47	**21st of 24**; Relegated	Ryan Lowe	19	R2	1-0-1	R3	1-1-1	R1	0-0-1	5,113
**2014–15**	**Football**; **League Two**	4	46	9	12	25	45	67	-22	39	**24th of 24**; Relegated	Max Power	7	R3	2-1-1	R1	0-0-1	ASF	1-2-0	5,192
**2015–16**	**National League**	5	46	22	12	12	61	44	+17	78	**6th of 24**	James Norwood	19	QR4	0-1-1			R1	0-0-1	5,214
**2016–17**	**National League**	5	46	29	8	9	79	39	+40	95	**2nd of 24**	Andy Cook	23	QR4	0-0-1			SF	4-2-1	5,173
**2016–17**	**National League**	5	Lost in the play-off final.											QR4	0-0-1			SF	4-2-1	5,173
**2017–18**	**National League**	5	46	24	10	12	78	46	+32	82	**2nd of 24**	Andy Cook	26	R1	1-1-1			R1	0-0-1	5,136
**2017–18**	**National League**	5	Promoted after winning the play-offs.											R1	1-1-1			R1	0-0-1	5,136
**2018–19**	**EFL League Two**	4	46	20	13	13	63	50	+13	73	**6th of 24**	James Norwood	29	R3	2-2-1	R1	0-0-1	GS	0-0-3	6,541
**2018–19**	**EFL League Two**	4	Promoted after winning the play-offs.											R3	2-2-1	R1	0-0-1	GS	0-0-3	6,541
**2019–20**	**EFL League One**	3	34	8	8	18	36	60	-24	32	**21st of 23**; Demoted	Morgan Ferrier	5	R4	3-2-1	R1	0-0-1	R3	2-0-2	6,799
**2019–20**	**EFL League One**	3	Demoted by PPG due to curtailment from COVID-19 pandemic.											R4	3-2-1	R1	0-0-1	R3	2-0-2	6,799
**2020–21**	**EFL League Two**	4	46	20	13	13	55	50	+5	73	**7th of 24**	James Vaughan	18	R3	2-0-1	R1	0-1-0	F	5-2-1	1,749 (Note: Majority of League games played behind closed doors. Restricted attendances for 2 home league games due to COVID-19 pandemic, 2000 Walsall (h), 1498 Bradford (h))
**2020–21**	**EFL League Two**	4	Lost in play-off semifinal											R3	2-0-1	R1	0-1-0	F	5-2-1	1,749
**2021–22**	**EFL League Two**	4	46	21	12	13	53	40	+13	75	**9th of 24**	Kane Hemmings	8	R2	1-0-1	R1	0-1-0	R2	3-0-1	6,723
**2022–23**	**EFL League Two**	4	46	15	13	18	45	48	-3	58	**12th of 24**	Josh Hawkes	11	R1	0-0-1	R2	0-1-1	R2	1-2-1	6,142
**2023–24**	**EFL League Two**	4	46	17	6	23	67	70	-3	57	**16th of 24**	Connor Jennings; Rob Apter	12	R1	0-0-1	R2	0-1-1	GS	0-1-2	6,302
**2024–25**	**EFL League Two**	4	46	12	15	19	45	65	-20	51	**20th of 24**	Omari Patrick	11	R1	0-0-1	R2	0-1-1	R32	2-0-2	6,306
**2025–26**	**EFL League Two**	4	46	10	11	25	54	79	-25	41	**21st of 24**	Charlie Whitaker	9	R1	0-0-1	R1	0-1-0	R32	2-1-1	6,714
