= Harry Littlehales =

English footballer

Personal information
- Full name: Henry Littlehales
- Date of birth: 26 August 1901
- Place of birth: Burslem, England
- Date of death: 1989 (aged 87–88)
- Height: 5 ft 7 1/2 in (1.71 m)
- Position: Inside forward

Senior career*
Years	Team	Apps	(Gls)
1919–1920	Goldenhill Wanderers		
1920–1921	Rudyard		
1921–1922	Port Vale	0	(0)
1922–1923	Reading	6	(1)
1923–1932	Tranmere Rovers	162	(50)
1932–1933	Wrexham	5	(0)
Total		173+	(51+)
- * Club domestic league appearances and goals

Henry Littlehales (26 August 1901 – 1989) was an English footballer who played as an inside forward for Reading, Tranmere Rovers and Wrexham. He made 173 appearances for Tranmere, scoring 52 goals.

== Career statistics ==
Appearances and goals by club, season and competition
Club	Season	League			FA Cup		Total	
Club	Season	Division	Apps	Goals	Apps	Goals	Apps	Goals
Port Vale	1921–22	Second Division	0	0	0	0	0	0
Reading	1922–23	Third Division South	6	1	0	0	6	1
Tranmere Rovers	1923–24	Third Division North	17	7	0	0	17	7
Tranmere Rovers	1924–25	Third Division North	20	10	4	1	24	11
Tranmere Rovers	1925–26	Third Division North	12	4	0	0	12	4
Tranmere Rovers	1926–27	Third Division North	4	1	1	1	5	2
Tranmere Rovers	1927–28	Third Division North	33	15	3	0	36	15
Tranmere Rovers	1928–29	Third Division North	39	13	2	0	41	13
Tranmere Rovers	1929–30	Third Division North	16	0	0	0	16	0
Tranmere Rovers	1930–31	Third Division North	3	0	0	0	3	0
Tranmere Rovers	1931–32	Third Division North	18	0	1	0	19	0
Tranmere Rovers	Total		162	50	11	2	173	52
Wrexham	1932–33	Third Division North	5	0	0	0	5	0
Career total			173	51	11	2	184	53
