= 1927–28 Blackpool F.C. season =

English football club season

Blackpool F.C.
1927–28 season
- Manager: Sydney Beaumont
- Division Two: 19th
- FA Cup: Third round
- Top goalscorer: League: Jimmy Hampson (31); All: Jimmy Hampson (31)
Home colours

The 1927–28 season was Blackpool F.C.'s 27th season (24th consecutive) in the Football League. They competed in the 22-team Division Two, then the second tier of English football, finishing nineteenth.

Sydney Beaumont became the club's new manager prior to the start of the season, succeeding Major Frank Buckley.

Jimmy Hampson was the club's top scorer, with 31 goals, including four goals against Nottingham Forest at Bloomfield Road on 24 March 1928, Blackpool winning 5–3. He also scored two hat-tricks: one at Wolves on 26 November 1927, and one at home to Fulham on 5 May 1928, the final day of the season. Two other players also scored hat-tricks during the season: Tommy Browell, in a 6–2 victory over Bristol City at Bloomfield Road, and Bert Fishwick, in a 3–1 victory at home to Reading.

A milestone occurred on Christmas Eve, when Blackpool played their 1,000th Football League game, at Fulham.

== Season synopsis ==
It took until the seventh game (after a run of five consecutive defeats) for Blackpool to chalk up their first victory, a 6–2 scoreline at home to Bristol City. Tommy Browell scored a hat-trick, while Albert Watson, Sidney Tufnell and Horace Williams netted one each.

They were victorious in only three further games before Christmas, at which point they had accrued just thirteen points.

1928 saw a slight improvement, with eight victories, which kept them just clear of relegation.

Their FA Cup campaign started and ended at the Third Round stage with a 4–1 home defeat by Oldham Athletic.

=== Squad ===
- Len Crompton
- Percy Thorpe
- Arthur Tilford
- Albert Watson
- George Ayres
- Billy Benton
- Jack Meredith
- Tommy Browell
- Billy Tremelling
- Mark Crook
- Percy Downes
- Ted Malpas
- Fred Mobbs
- John Grimwood
- William Cowan
- Horace Williams
- Syd Tuffnell
- Jimmy Hampson
- Laurie Barnett
- Dick Neal
- Reg Wright
- William Grant
- Syd Brookes
- Bert Fishwick
- Bobby Hughes
- Johnny McIntyre
- Arthur Purdy
- Jack Oxberry
- Stan Ramsay

== Table ==
| Pos | Team | Pld | W | D | L | GF | GA | GAv | Pts | Promotion or relegation |
|---|---|---|---|---|---|---|---|---|---|---|
| 17 | Southampton | 42 | 14 | 7 | 21 | 68 | 77 | 0.883 | 35 | |
| 18 | Reading | 42 | 11 | 13 | 18 | 53 | 75 | 0.707 | 35 | |
| 19 | Blackpool | 42 | 13 | 8 | 21 | 83 | 101 | 0.822 | 34 | |
| 20 | Clapton Orient | 42 | 11 | 12 | 19 | 55 | 85 | 0.647 | 34 | |
| 21 | Fulham (R) | 42 | 13 | 7 | 22 | 68 | 89 | 0.764 | 33 | Relegation to the Third Division South |

(R) Relegated
