= Bert Fishwick =

English footballer (1899-1961)

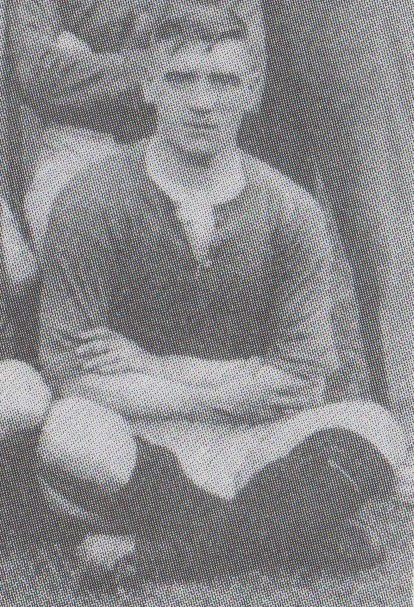
- Fishwick in 1929

Personal information
- Full name: Albert Edward Fishwick
- Date of birth: 1899
- Place of birth: Chorley, England
- Date of death: 1961 (aged 61–62)
- Place of death: Chorley, England
- Position: Forward

Youth career
- Leyland
- Hamilton Central
- Chorley

Senior career*
Years	Team	Apps	(Gls)
1923–1925	Plymouth Argyle	7	(1)
1925–1928	Blackpool	58	(36)
1928–1931	Port Vale	39	(15)
1931–1933	Tranmere Rovers	83	(9)
- Chorley
Total		187+	(61+)
- * Club domestic league appearances and goals

Albert Edward Fishwick (1899–1961) was an English footballer. He scored 61 goals in 188 league games in a ten-year career in the Football League, playing for Plymouth Argyle, Blackpool, Port Vale, and Tranmere Rovers. He helped Vale to the Third Division North title in 1929–30.

== Career ==
Fishwick played for Leyland, Hamilton Central and Chorley (in two spells) before joining Plymouth Argyle. He made his debut in the Third Division South, in a 1–0 defeat at Northampton Town on 10 November 1923. He signed with Blackpool in 1925. He made his debut for Frank Buckley's team on 24 October, in a 4–0 victory over Wolves at Bloomfield Road. He scored his first (two) goals for the club in the next game – a 4–3 win at South Shields on 31 October. He went on to make a total of 28 league appearances in the 1925–26 campaign. He finished as the team's top scorer, with 19 goals to his name, helping the "Seasiders" to a sixth-placed finish in the Second Division. The following season, 1926–27, Fishwick made 25 league appearances, scoring 13 goals in the process, including a hat-trick in the third league game of the season – a 6–1 win at home to Barnsley.

After making six league appearances for Blackpool during the 1927–28 season, Fishwick joined Port Vale in March 1928. His first game was a Potteries derby match on 17 March 1928, which finished goalless. He enjoyed regular football for the rest of the season, scoring once in nine Second Division games. He hit six goals in 15 appearances in 1928–29, as the "Valiants" were relegated into the Third Division North. They came straight back up as champions in 1929–30, with Fishwick scoring four goals in five games. He hit four goals in 12 games in 1930–31, all coming within the space of three games. He was sold to Tranmere Rovers in March 1931 and later returned to his hometown club Chorley. Rovers finished fourth in the Third Division North in 1931–32 and 11th in 1932–33.

== Career statistics ==
Appearances and goals by club, season and competition
Club	Season	League			FA Cup		Other		Total	
Club	Season	Division	Apps	Goals	Apps	Goals	Apps	Goals	Apps	Goals
Plymouth Argyle	1923–24	Third Division South	6	1	0	0	0	0	6	1
Plymouth Argyle	1924–25	Third Division South	1	0	0	0	0	0	1	0
Plymouth Argyle	Total		7	1	0	0	0	0	7	1
Blackpool	1925–26	Second Division	26	19	0	0	0	0	26	19
Blackpool	1926–27	Second Division	25	13	0	0	0	0	25	13
Blackpool	1927–28	Second Division	7	4	0	0	0	0	7	4
Blackpool	Total		58	36	0	0	0	0	58	36
Port Vale	1927–28	Second Division	9	1	0	0	0	0	9	1
Port Vale	1928–29	Second Division	14	6	1	0	0	0	15	6
Port Vale	1929–30	Third Division North	5	4	0	0	0	0	5	4
Port Vale	1930–31	Second Division	11	4	1	0	0	0	12	4
Port Vale	Total		39	15	2	0	0	0	41	15
Tranmere Rovers	1930–31	Third Division North	1	0	0	0	0	0	1	0
Tranmere Rovers	1931–32	Third Division North	15	5	0	0	0	0	15	5
Tranmere Rovers	1932–33	Third Division North	39	4	6	0	0	0	45	4
Tranmere Rovers	1933–34	Third Division North	28	0	3	0	1	0	32	0
Tranmere Rovers	Total		83	9	9	0	1	0	93	9
Career total			187	61	11	0	1	0	199	61

== Honours ==
Port Vale

- Football League Third Division North: 1929–30
