= Jack Watson (Scottish footballer) =

Scottish footballer (1911–1944)

Personal information
- Full name: John George Watson
- Date of birth: 3 December 1911
- Place of birth: Edinburgh, Scotland
- Date of death: 9 September 1944 (aged 32)
- Place of death: Italy
- Height: 6 ft 0 in (1.83 m)
- Positions: Centre half; inside forward

Senior career*
Years	Team	Apps	(Gls)
–1930	Dunoon Milton Rovers		
1930–1937	Tranmere Rovers	4	(1)
1937–19??	South Liverpool		
- * Club domestic league appearances and goals

John George Watson (3 December 1911 – 9 September 1944) was a Scottish professional footballer who played as a centre half or inside forward in the English Football League for Tranmere Rovers.

== Life and career ==
John George Watson was born on 3 December 1911 in Edinburgh, Scotland, to J. Elder Watson, a Baptist minister, and his wife. The family moved home several times following Rev. Watson's calling, from Bellshill to Cowdenbeath in 1921, then to Dunoon in 1924, and to Birkenhead, England, in 1930.

Watson played football as an inside left for junior club Dunoon Milton Rovers before signing for his new home-town club, Tranmere Rovers, in 1930. He was captain of Tranmere's reserve team in the 1933–34 season, and came into the first team at centre half for the Welsh Cup seventh-round replay against Newport County. Despite narrowly failing to score an own goal, he was on the winning side. He kept his place, and made his Football League debut on 10 March 1934 in the Third Division North visit to Walsall. Tranmere lost 5–3, but with Watson still in the team, they beat York City 3–0 the following week. Playing at inside left, the position for which he was signed, Watson scored his first senior goal to tie the scores at home to Stockport County on 23 April.

He captained the Cheshire Football Association's amateur representative team in the final of the Northern Counties Amateur Championship; Cheshire lost 3–1 to the East Riding of Yorkshire. The last of his five senior appearances for Tranmere came in April 1936, but he remained with the club until February 1937, when he joined South Liverpool of the Lancashire Combination.

== Military service and death ==
Watson served in the Royal Artillery during the Second World War. At the rank of Captain and becoming attached to the 1st Battalion London Scottish, Gordon Highlanders, he was killed in action on the Gothic Line in Italy on 9 September 1944 and was buried at Montecchio War Cemetery.

== Career statistics ==
Appearances and goals by club, season and competition
Club	Season	League			FA Cup		Other		Total	
Club	Season	Division	Apps	Goals	Apps	Goals	Apps	Goals	Apps	Goals
Tranmere Rovers	1933–34	Third Division North	3	1	0	0	0	0	3	1
Tranmere Rovers	1934–35	Third Division North	0	0	0	0	1 (Note: Appearance in Third Division North Cup)	0	1	0
Tranmere Rovers	1935–36	Third Division North	1	0	0	0	0	0	1	0
Career total			4	1	0	0	1	0	5	1
