= Horace Baker (footballer) =

English footballer

Personal information
- Full name: Horace Anthony Baker
- Date of birth: 1 September 1910
- Place of birth: Fenton, England
- Date of death: 1 March 1974 (aged 63)
- Place of death: Creswell, England
- Height: 5 ft 8 in (1.73 m)
- Positions: Outside right; right winger

Youth career
- Longton Hall

Senior career*
Years	Team	Apps	(Gls)
1932–1934	Port Vale	10	(1)
1934–1936	Tranmere Rovers	23	(10)
1936–1937	Shrewsbury Town		
1937–1938	Southport	20	(3)
- Shrewsbury Town
Total		53	(14)
- * Club domestic league appearances and goals

Horace Anthony Baker (1 September 1910 – 1 March 1974) was an English footballer who played at outside-right for Port Vale, Tranmere Rovers, Shrewsbury Town and Southport. His younger brother, Frank, was also a professional footballer.

== Early and personal life ==
Horace Anthony Baker was the son of a former Fenton Town player and four of his brothers also played football, including the youngest Frank, who went on to play for Stoke City. Baker worked as a bus conductor before World War II and was working as a spot-welder when he died of a heart attack during his sleep on 1 March 1974.

== Career ==
Baker played for Longton Hall before joining Port Vale as an amateur in March 1932, signing professional forms two months later. He made seven Second Division appearances in the 1932–33 season, scoring one goal in a 4–0 win over Notts County at the Old Recreation Ground on 20 March. He featured just three times in the 1933–34 season, and was given a free transfer to Tranmere Rovers in May 1934. Tranmere finished sixth and third in the Third Division North in 1934–35 and 1935–36; Baker played 23 league games at Prenton Park, scoring ten goals. He later played for Shrewsbury Town, scoring 30 goals in the Birmingham League from outside-right. He went on to sign with Southport, where he scored on his league debut against Accrington Stanley. He lost his first-team place to Albert Stapleton after a 5–0 defeat at Crewe Alexandra. He later returned to Shrewsbury Town.

== Career statistics ==
Appearances and goals by club, season and competition
Club	Season	League			Other		Total	
Club	Season	Division	Apps	Goals	Apps	Goals	Apps	Goals
Port Vale	1932–33	Second Division	7	1	0	0	7	1
Port Vale	1933–34	Second Division	3	0	0	0	3	0
Port Vale	Total		10	1	0	0	10	1
Tranmere Rovers	1934–35	Third Division North	19	8	2	2	21	10
Tranmere Rovers	1935–36	Third Division North	4	2	0	0	4	2
Tranmere Rovers	Total		23	10	2	2	25	12
Southport	1937–38	Third Division North	20	3	4	2	24	5
