= Royal Academy of Music =

Conservatoire in London

Coordinates: 51°31′25″N 0°09′07″W

- Type: Public
- Established: 1822; 204 years ago
- Parent institution: University of London
- Affiliations: ABRSM; King's College London
- Endowment: £64.3 million (2025)
- Budget: £33.2 million (2024/25)
- President: The Duchess of Gloucester
- Principal: Jonathan Freeman-Attwood
- Students: 775 (2024/25)
- Undergraduates: 385 (2024/25)
- Postgraduates: 390 (2024/25)
- Location: Marylebone Road, Westminster, Greater London, England
- Website: ram.ac.uk

The Royal Academy of Music (RAM) in Westminster, London, England, is one of the oldest music schools in the United Kingdom, founded in 1822 by John Fane and Nicolas-Charles Bochsa. It received its royal charter in 1830 from King George IV with the support of the first Duke of Wellington.

The academy provides undergraduate and postgraduate training across instrumental performance, composition, jazz, musical theatre and opera, and recruits musicians from around the world, with a student community representing more than 50 nationalities. It is committed to lifelong learning, from Junior Academy, which trains musicians up to the age of 18, through Open Academy community music projects, to performances and educational events for all ages.

The academy's museum houses one of the world's most significant collections of musical instruments and artefacts, including stringed instruments by Stradivari, Guarneri, and members of the Amati family; manuscripts by Purcell, Handel and Vaughan Williams; and a collection of performing materials that belonged to leading performers. It is a constituent college of the University of London and a registered charity under English law.

Famous academy alumni include Henry Wood, Simon Rattle, Brian Ferneyhough, Elton John, and Annie Lennox.

== History ==
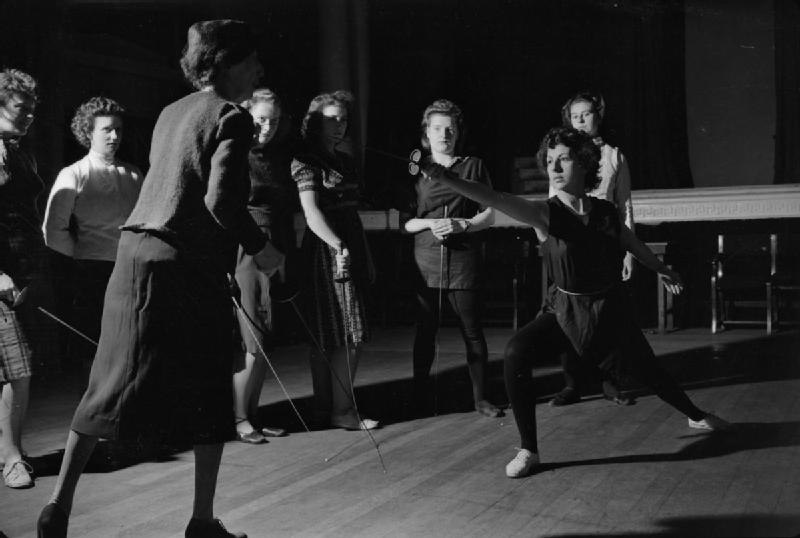
Students take a lesson in fencing in 1944

The academy was founded by John Fane, 11th Earl of Westmorland, in 1822 with the help and ideas of the French harpist and composer Nicolas Bochsa. It was granted a royal charter by King George IV in 1830. The founding of the academy was greatly supported by Arthur Wellesley, 1st Duke of Wellington, this was primarily thanks to the Earl's wife Priscilla Fane, Countess of Westmorland being the niece of the Duke but he was a keen violinist himself and determined to make the academy a success.

The academy faced closure in 1866; this was part of the reason for the founding of the Royal College of Music in South Kensington. The academy's history took a turn for the better when its recently appointed Principal (and former pupil) William Sterndale Bennett took on the chairmanship of the academy's board of directors and established its finances and reputation on a sounder footing.

The academy's first building was in Tenterden Street, Hanover Square. Arnold Bax recalled it as an architectural rabbit warren. "The three eighteenth-century houses which the institution comprised were departitioned, one conjectured, with fearsome violence. Wherefore else the need for those torturous tunnellings, that labyrinthine intricacy of passages, the cul-de-sacs, and follies? It took the average new student about a month to get his or her bearings." In 1911 the institution moved to the current premises, designed by Sir Ernest George (which include the 450-seat Duke's Hall), built at a cost of £51,000 on the site of an orphanage. In 1976 the academy acquired the houses situated on the north side and built between them a new opera theatre donated by the philanthropist Sir Jack Lyons and named after him and two new recital spaces, a recording studio, an electronic music studio, several practice rooms and office space.

The academy again expanded its facilities in the late 1990s, with the addition of 1–5 York Gate, designed by John Nash in 1822, to house the new museum, a musical theatre studio and several teaching and practice rooms. To link the main building and 1–5 York Gate a new underground passage and the underground barrel-vaulted 150-seat David Josefowitz recital hall were built on the courtyard between the mentioned structures.

== Campus and location ==
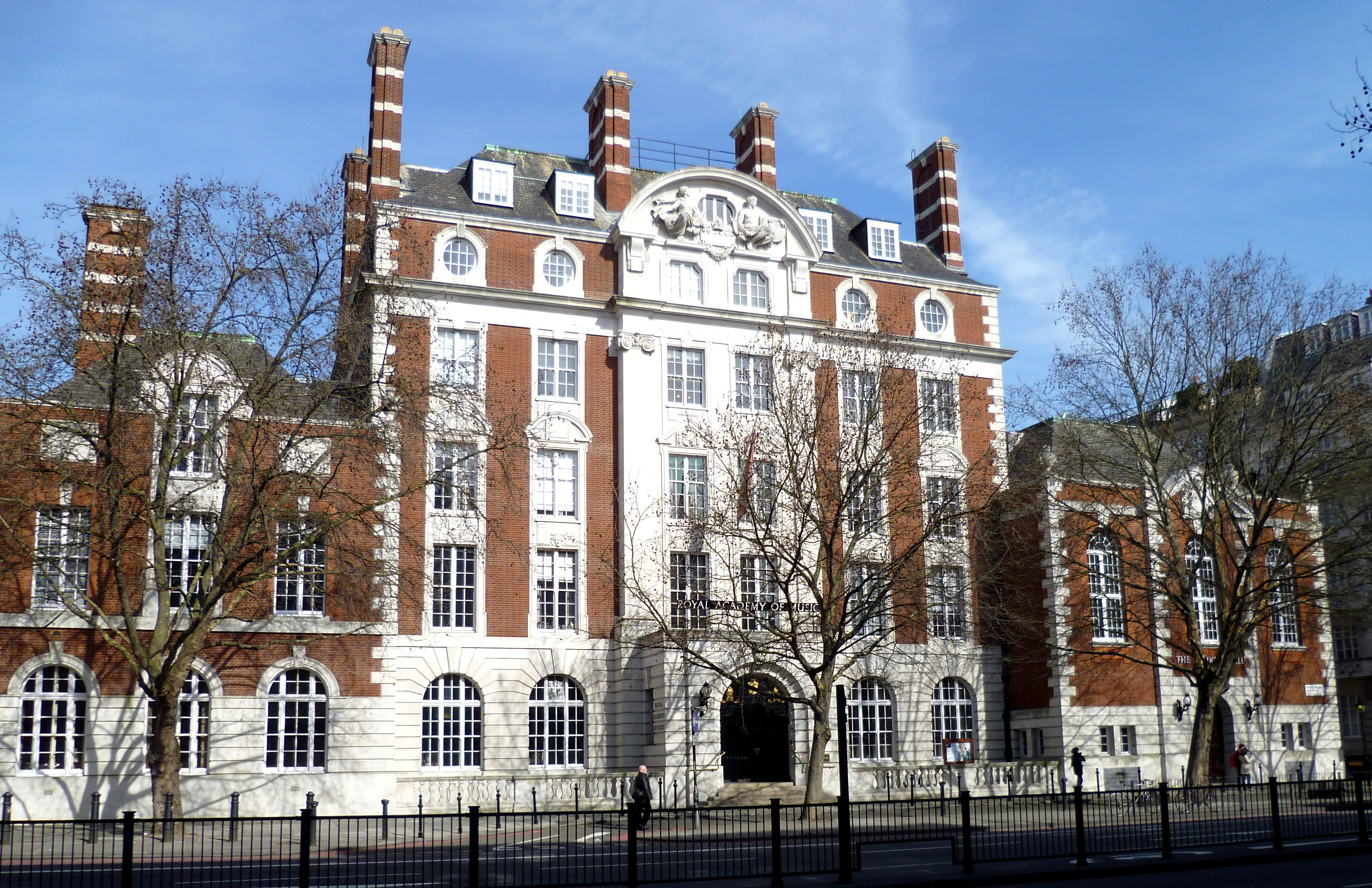
The facade of the Royal Academy of Music

The academy's current facilities are situated on Marylebone Road in central London adjacent to Regent's Park.

== Teaching ==
The Royal Academy of Music offers training from infant level (Junior Academy), with the senior Academy awarding the LRAM diploma, BMus and higher degrees to PhD/ DMus. The former degree GRSM, equivalent to a university honours degree and taken by some students, was phased out in the 1990s. All undergraduates now take the University of London degree of BMus.

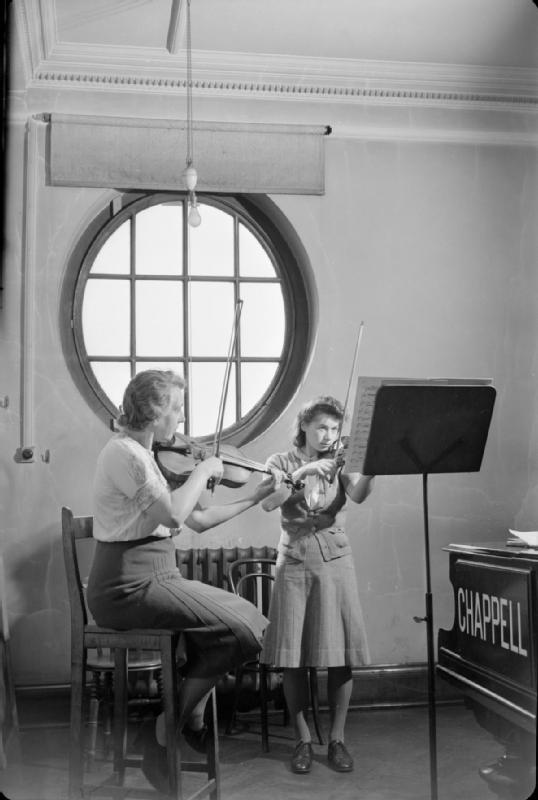
A violin lesson in 1944

Most academy students are classical performers: strings, piano, vocal studies including opera, brass, woodwind, conducting and choral conducting, composition, percussion, harp, organ, accordion, guitar. There are also departments for historical performance, musical theatre performance and jazz.

The academy collaborates with other conservatoires worldwide, including participating in the SOCRATES student and staff exchange programme. In 1991, the academy introduced a fully accredited degree in performance studies, and in September 1999, it became a full constituent college of the University of London, in both cases becoming the first UK conservatoire to do so.

The academy has students from over 50 countries, following diverse programmes including instrumental performance, conducting, composition, jazz, musical theatre, historical performance, and opera. The academy has an established relationship with King's College London, particularly the Department of Music, whose students receive instrumental tuition at the academy. In return, many students at the academy take a range of humanities choices at King's, and its extended academic musicological curriculum.

The Junior Academy, for pupils under the age of 18, meets every Saturday.

== Library and archives ==
The academy's library contains over 160,000 items, including significant collections of early printed and manuscript materials and audio facilities. The library also houses archives dedicated to Sir Arthur Sullivan and Sir Henry Wood. Among the Library's most valuable possessions are the autograph manuscripts of Purcell's The Fairy-Queen, Sullivan's The Mikado and The Martyr of Antioch, Vaughan Williams' Fantasia on a Theme by Thomas Tallis and Serenade to Music, and the newly discovered Handel Gloria. A grant from the National Heritage Memorial Fund has assisted in the purchase of the Robert Spencer Collection—a set of Early English Song and Lute music, as well as a fine collection of lutes and guitars. The academy's museum displays many of these items. The Orchestral Library has approximately 4,500 sets of orchestral parts. Other collections include the libraries of Sir Henry Wood and Otto Klemperer.

Soon after violinist Yehudi Menuhin's death, the Royal Academy of Music acquired his personal archive, which includes sheet music marked up for performance, correspondence, news articles and photographs relating to Menuhin, autograph musical manuscripts, and several portraits of Paganini.

Harriet Cohen bequeathed a large collection of paintings, some photographs and her gold bracelet to the academy, with a request that the room in which the paintings were to be housed was named the "Arnold Bax Room". Noted for her performances of Bach and modern English music, she was a friend and advocate of Arnold Bax and also premièred Vaughan Williams' Piano Concerto—a work dedicated to her—in 1933. In 1886, Franz Liszt performed at the academy to celebrate the creation of the Franz Liszt Scholarship and in 1843 Mendelssohn was made an honorary member of the academy.

== Student performances and festivals ==
Academy students perform regularly in the academy's concert venues, and also nationally and internationally under conductors such as the late Sir Colin Davis, Yan Pascal Tortelier, Christoph von Dohnányi, the late Sir Charles Mackerras and Trevor Pinnock. In summer 2012, John Adams conducted an orchestra which combined students from the academy and New York's Juilliard School at the Proms and at New York's Lincoln Center. Conductors who have recently worked with the orchestras include Semyon Bychkov, Daniel Barenboim, Sir Simon Rattle, Pierre-Laurent Aimard and Christian Thielemann. Famous people who have conducted the academy's orchestra also include Carl Maria von Weber in 1826 and Richard Strauss in 1926.

For many years, the academy celebrated the work of a living composer with a festival in the presence of the composer. Previous composer festivals at the academy have been devoted to the work of Witold Lutosławski, Michael Tippett, Krzysztof Penderecki, Olivier Messiaen, Hans Werner Henze, Luciano Berio, Elliott Carter, as well as academy graduates, Alfred Schnittke, György Ligeti, Franco Donatoni, Galina Ustvolskaya, Arvo Pärt, György Kurtág and Mauricio Kagel.

In February–March 2006, an academy festival celebrated the violin virtuoso Niccolò Paganini, who first visited London 175 years earlier in 1831. The festival included a recital by academy professor Maxim Vengerov, who performed on Il Cannone Guarnerius, Paganini's favourite violin. Academy instrumentalists and musical theatre students have also performed in a series of concerts with the academy alumnus Sir Elton John.

The students and ensembles of the Royal Academy of Music perform in other venues around London including Kings Place, St Marylebone Parish Church and the South Bank Centre.

== Museum and collections ==
The academy's public museum is situated in the York Gate building, which is connected to the academy's building via a basement link. The museum houses the academy's collections, including a major collection of Cremonese stringed instruments dated between 1650 and 1740, a selection of historical English pianos from 1790 to 1850, from the famous Mobbs Collection, original manuscripts by Purcell, Mendelssohn, Liszt, Brahms, Sullivan and Vaughan Williams, musical memorabilia and other exhibits.

== People ==
=== Alumni ===
Former students include Olga Athaide Craen, John Barbirolli, Judith Bingham, Dennis Brain, Alan Bush, Doreen Carwithen, Rebecca Clarke, Jacob Collier, Clifford Curzon, Louis Dowdeswell, Edward Gardner, Lesley Garrett, David Patrick Gedge, Evelyn Glennie, Eleanor Greenwood, Amy Horrocks, Dorothy Howell, Joe Jackson, Katherine Jenkins, Elton John, Annie Lennox, Kate Loder, Felicity Lott, Moura Lympany, Margot MacGibbon, Vanessa-Mae, Denis Matthews, Michael Nyman, Ashan Pillai, Agnes Clune Quinlan, Simon Rattle, Elsie Southgate, Eva Ruth Spalding, Florence Margaret Spencer Palmer, Jonas Stark, Cecile Stevens, Arthur Sullivan, Bryceson Treharne, Eva Turner, Maxim Vengerov, Kate Lucy Ward, Jonathan Waterworth, E. Florence Whitlock, Margaret Jones Wiles, Carol Anne Williams, Henry Wood and some members of the London Vegetable Orchestra.

=== Academics and staff ===
The current principal of the academy is Jonathan Freeman-Attwood, appointed in July 2008. The Patron was Queen Elizabeth II and the president is the Duchess of Gloucester. Diana, Princess of Wales, was the president of the academy from 1985 until 1997.

== Prizes and honorary awards ==
The Royal Academy of Music publishes every year a list of persons who have been selected to be awarded one of the Royal Academy's honorary awards. These awards are for alumni who have distinguished themselves within the music profession (Fellow of the Royal Academy of Music, FRAM), distinguished musicians who are not alumni (Honorary Member of the Royal Academy of Music, Hon RAM), alumni who have made a significant contribution to the music profession (Associate of the Royal Academy of Music, ARAM) and to people who are not alumni but have offered important services to the institution (Honorary Associate of the Royal Academy of Music, Hon ARAM). Honorary Fellowship of the Royal Academy of Music (Hon FRAM) is awarded by the Governing Body of the academy. As a full member of the University of London, the academy can nominate people to the University of London honorary doctorate (Hon DMus).

The Royal Academy of Music manages the Royal Academy of Music Bach Prize (sponsored by the Kohn Foundation), a music award to musicians or scholars who have made an important contribution to the music of Johann Sebastian Bach.

The Gilbert Betjemann Prize is a gold medal awarded by the Royal Academy of Music "for operatic singing".
