= 1922–23 Tranmere Rovers F.C. season =

Tranmere Rovers F.C.
1922–23 season
- Manager: Bert Cooke
- Stadium: Prenton Park
- Third Division North: 16th
- FA Cup: Fourth Qualifying Round
Team colours

Tranmere Rovers F.C. played the 1922–23 season in the Football League Third Division North. It was their second season of league football, and they finished 16th of 20. They reached the Fourth Qualifying Round of the FA Cup.

== Football League ==
Pos	Team	Pld	W	D	L	GF	GA	GAv	Pts
14	Grimsby Town	38	14	5	19	55	52	1.058	33
15	Hartlepools United	38	10	12	16	48	54	0.889	32
16	Tranmere Rovers	38	12	8	18	49	59	0.831	32
17	Southport	38	12	7	19	32	46	0.696	31
18	Barrow	38	13	4	21	50	60	0.833	30

Source: rsssf.com
