= Elsie Southgate =

British violinist (1880–1946)

Elsie Muriel Southgate (23 January 1880 – 5 May 1946) was a British violinist and composer who toured England as a classical musician, played in vaudeville in the United States and Canada, and recorded commercially accompanied by her sister, organist and composer Dorothy Southgate (1889 - 1946).

Southgate was born in London to Violet and Frank Sewell Southgate, a singing teacher. She married Charles Edward Pearse in 1904 and they had two daughters, Olga Odin-Pearse (1908) and actress Daphne Odin-Pearse (1909).

Thanksgiving (1916)
A sound recording made with her sister, Dorothy.

Southgate studied violin at the Royal Academy of Music with Émile Sauret. She made her debut as a violin soloist in 1901, performing at the Promenade Concerts in 1905 and throughout Europe in recitals. She played at Buckingham Palace and for the Shah of Iran and the King of Italy on her Guarneri violin.

Southgate stopped performing briefly after her marriage. When her husband died sometime before 1911, she resumed performing to support her two small daughters. In addition to playing classical violin music, she played in music halls and vaudeville theatres, touring the United States and Canada in 1926.

Southgate made several commercial recordings on Zonophone records, often accompanied by her sister Dorothy on organ. Her compositions included:

- Thanksgiving (violin and organ; with Dorothy Southgate)
- Vale Egyptienne (violin and organ)
