= Percy Downes =

English footballer (1905-1989)

Personal information
- Full name: Percy Downes
- Date of birth: 19 September 1905
- Place of birth: Langold, England
- Date of death: 1989 (aged 83 or 84)
- Height: 5 ft 10 1/2 in (1.79 m)
- Position: Midfielder

Senior career*
Years	Team	Apps	(Gls)
- Gainsborough Trinity
1925–1931	Blackpool	153	(32)
1931–1932	Hull City	11	(3)
1932–1934	Stockport County	82	(27)
1934–1936	Burnley	61	(6)
1936–1938	Oldham Athletic	51	(4)
- Gainsborough Trinity
- * Club domestic league appearances and goals

Percy Downes (19 September 1905 – 1989) was an English professional footballer. He spent six years at Blackpool in the early 20th century, making over 150 Football League appearances for the club, and over 350 league appearances in total. He played as a midfielder.

== Playing career ==
=== Early career ===
Downes' first senior team was Dinnington Main Colliery Welfare, where he started playing during the early 1920s. He later transferred to Gainsborough Trinity, where his performances earned him a move into professional football in the Football League with Blackpool.

=== Blackpool ===
Downes made his debut for the Seasiders six games into their 1925–26 league season, a single-goal defeat to Darlington at Bloomfield Road on 14 September 1925. He went on to make 21 further league appearances that campaign, scoring five goals. He also appeared in Blackpool's sole FA Cup tie that season.

The following season, 1926–27, Downes made 28 starts in the league, and scored six goals. Again, he appeared in the FA Cup as Blackpool exited at the third-round stage once more.

Frank Buckley, who signed Downes, was replaced as Blackpool manager by Sydney Beaumont prior to the 1927–28 term, but he was still kept in favour, making nineteen appearances in the league and scoring four goals.

Downes appeared in well over half of Blackpool's league games in 1928–29, which was Harry Evans' first season in charge. Downes scored four goals, all in Blackpool victories. He also appeared in Blackpool's FA Cup third-round exit match at Plymouth Argyle.

In the 1929–30 campaign, Downes missed only five games as Blackpool finished as Division Two champions. He also scored thirteen goals, his highest season-total for the club, including a hat-trick in a 7–1 victory at home to Bristol City on 26 October 1929. Blackpool also made it to the fourth round of the FA Cup for the first time in four seasons, but Downes missed out on the match.

Downes' final season with Blackpool, 1930–31, saw his make sixteen appearances in the top flight for the club. He failed to score in the league for the first time in his six seasons with the Seasiders, but he did score Blackpool's goal in their FA Cup fourth-round 2–1 defeat at Southport on 24 January 1931.

His final appearance for Blackpool occurred on 18 February 1931, in a single-goal defeat at home to Birmingham City.

=== Hull City ===
In 1931, Downes joined Football League Third Division North side Hull City, where he played eleven matches and scored three goals as the team finished eighth in their division. He stayed at Hull for just one season.

=== Stockport County ===
Downes signed for Third Division North outfit Stockport prior to the 1932–33 season. He racked up 82 appearances and notched 17 goals for the club as they secured consecutive third-placed finishes in the division.

=== Burnley ===
Downes' consistent goalscoring in the Third Division earned him a move to Second Division side Burnley in the summer of 1934. He spent two seasons with the Clarets, but only managed to score a total of six goals in the league. He helped Burnley to the semi-final of the FA Cup in the 1934–35 season, and played a total of 61 league games before he left to join Oldham Athletic.

=== Oldham Athletic ===
Downes played a total of 51 matches for the Latics, scoring just 4 times in two seasons. In 1938, he retired from professional football and returned to Gainsborough Trinity.
