= Florence Percy McIntyre =

American short story writer, journalist and clubwoman

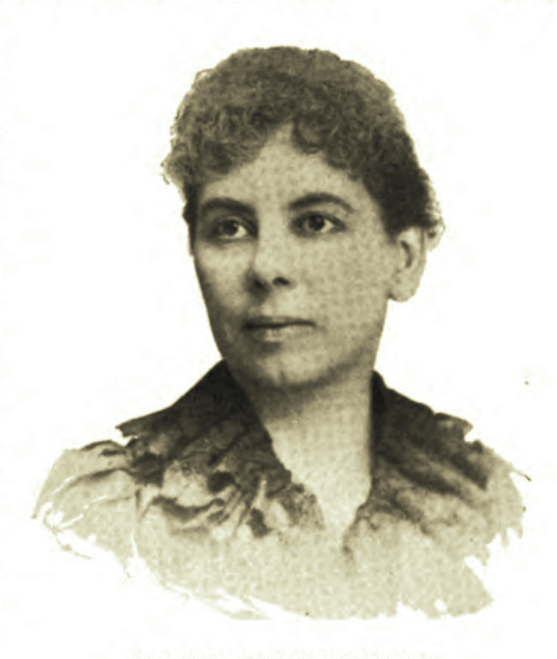
- McIntyre in 1893
- Born: Florence Percy Taylor; 1855; Farmington, Maine, U.S.
- Died: January 17, 1923 (aged 67–68); Portland, Maine, U.S.
- Education: Female Collegiate Institute
- Occupations: journalist; writer; clubwoman
- Spouses: Alexander Matheson (m. 1877; died 1904); Philip Willis McIntyre (m. 1905; died 1912)
- Relatives: Elizabeth Akers Allen (mother)
- Writing career
- Pen name: Annie L. Forcello; Florence Allen
- Genre: short stories

Florence Percy McIntyre (pen names Annie L. Forcello and Florence Allen; née Taylor; after first marriage Matheson; after second marriage McIntyre; 1855–1923) was an American short story writer, journalist, and clubwoman with a wide reputation in literary and journalistic circles. She was a charter member and president of the Pacific Coast Women's Press Association; charter member and director of the California Historic Landmarks League; ex-officio vice president of the Women's Council of San Francisco; and director of the State of Maine Association (600 members) of California. McIntyre opposed women's suffrage.

== Early life and education ==
Florence Percy Taylor was born in Farmington, Maine, in 1855. She was the eldest daughter of Elizabeth Akers Allen. Through her mother, McIntyre was a direct descendant of the Thomas Chase who served with John Paul Jones on the Bonhomme Richard.

Her young childhood was passed principally in Portland, Maine.

The chief part of her education was acquired in the Female Collegiate Institute at Richmond, Virginia, from which institution she was graduated with honors at the age of 17.

== Career ==
At a very early age, she began to write under the pen name of "Annie L. Forcelle" (an anagram of her own), and while still scarcely more than a child, was a paid contributor to the Saturday Evening Post, Lady's Friend, and Peterson's Magazine of Philadelphia.

Later, over the signature of "Florence Allen", she contributed short stories, sketches, and verses to the Aldine, Frank Leslie's publications, the Metropolitan, ToDay, the Home Journal, Old Dominion Magazine, Wide Awake, and other publications, besides regularly supplying illustrated stories under contract to E. C. Allen & Co., of Augusta, Georgia for 15 years.

After her marriage to Matheson in 1877, she spent several years in North Carolina, and later resided for a time in Baltimore, and in Waterville, Massachusetts, where the state of her health deteriorated and her physician recommended that she move to the Pacific Coast. There she visited the principal cities, and lived for a time in Sacramento and San Francisco; and then, for some years, made her home in the Santa Cruz Mountains. Returning to San Francisco in 1889, she soon identified herself with the leaders of the different progressive movements in that city, and entered upon practical and regular journalistic work, joining the repertorial staff of the San Francisco Call, which at that time employed only one woman besides herself in its local room.

Having for a brief time in her girlhood done reporting and desk work on the Advertiser in Portland, Maine, she was able to take up journalistic work in California, and before long, gave up reporting for the position of special writer on the Sunday edition of the Call. In that position, she remained for seven years, until she took charge of the Book Page of the Examiner, while at the same time writing specials for its Sunday supplement.

While in San Francisco, she was for a time assistant editor of Society, and edited and published its P.C.W.P.A. Bulletin, besides contributing to the Chronicle, Traveler, Town Talk, Pacific States Illustrated, Rural Press, City Argus, and Bull's Eye of that city.

She contributed to the American Magazine of Civics, Kate field's Washington, Ladies' Home Journal, Good Housekeeping, Table Talk, Boy's Magazine, Ladies' World, Munsey's Magazine, Record-union, and Santa Cruz Surf. She also conducted departments in the House Wife (New York) and in the Golden West and California Review, besides writing stories for these publications.

McIntyre wrote several musical comedies and vaudeville sketches for amateur production, besides composing a number of songs which were well received.

During the later years of McIntyre's residence in California, she read and lectured professionally before many of the clubs there. Her lecture on "Journalism as a Professor for Women" was delivered before the Laurel Hall Club and the Mills College Alumnae of San Francisco, the Ebell Club of Oakland, the Tea Club of Alameda, and the Southern California Press Club in Los Angeles. For the most part, her reading were from the poems of Elizabeth Akers, although she occasionally read some of the more dramatic of her own short stories in public.

She was also a member of the faculty of the Holmes College of Oratory (San Francisco), filling the chair of journalism, literature, and rhetoric in that institution.

While in San Francisco, McIntyre served as Treasurer and in 1902, was elected President of the Press Association. During her term as Presidentthere were 100 active and 20 associate members. She also served on the Board of Directors of the California Historic Landmarks League, and as Recording Secretary of the Women's Federation for Public Good (1896).

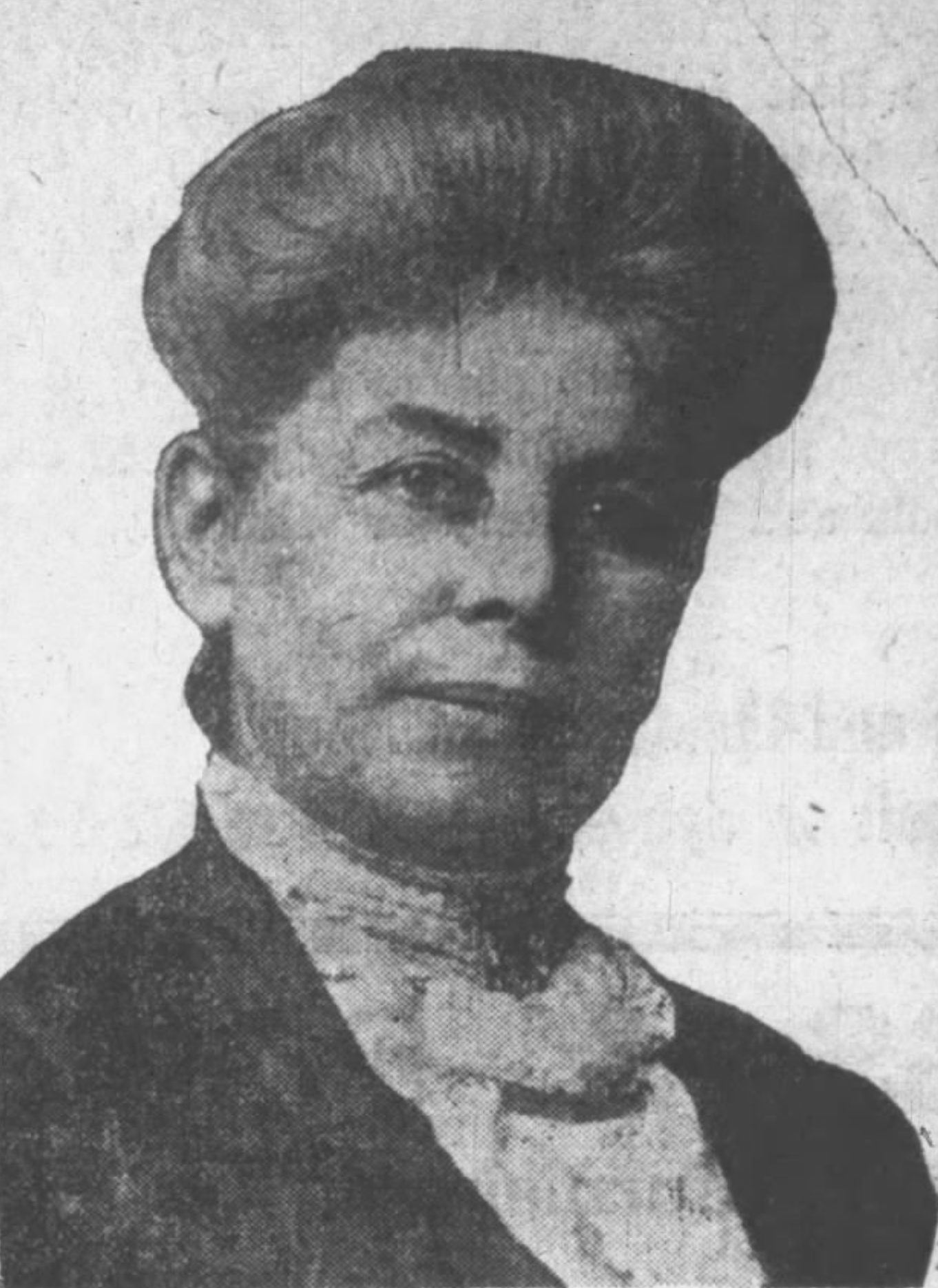
McIntyre in 1906

In the summer of 1903, poor health required that McIntyre stop working for a time. She removed to New York City where she remained at her mother's home until autumn of 1904, when she returned to Maine. Since coming to Portland, Maine, McIntyre wrote special articles for the Telegram, and contributed to the local magazine, The Pine Tree. She served on the editorial staff of the American Home Magazine, in which monthly she conducted two departments.

During World War I, McIntyre was active in the Liberty Bond drives and the Red Cross work. For a time, she was in charge of a hostess house in Washington, D.C.

== Personal life ==
Firstly, in New York City, on October 6, 1877, she married Alexander Matheson, Jr. (1844–1904). In December 1903, McIntyre was denied a divorce form her husband, Alexander Matheson, having failed to prove that she was a deserted wife.

On February 2, 1905, she married Philip Willis McIntyre (1847-1912) of Portland, Maine, where she subsequently made her home. The couple met in Portland years earlier. Her mother, Elizabeth Akers Allen, was then employed in the office of the Portland Advertiser, and Mr. McIntyre was on the editorial staff. During one of Florence's occasional visits at the Advertiser office, the couple met.

== Death ==
Florence Percy Taylor Matheson McIntyre died in Portland, Maine, on January 17, 1923.

== Selected works ==
- A book of verse, by Florence McIntyre. With illustrations by Mary Connell (1909) (text)
