= Mobbs =

Mobbs is an English surname. Notable people with the surname include:

- Edgar Mobbs (1882–1917), English rugby union footballer
- Fred Mobbs (1904–1979), English footballer
- Hedley Adams Mobbs (1891–1970), British architect
- Leslie Mobbs (1926–2005), South African cricketer
- Michael Mobbs, a Sydney-based author and environmental consultant
- Noel Mobbs (1878–1959), English businessman and founder of Slough Estates
- Nigel Mobbs (1937–2005), businessman and Lord Lieutenant of Buckinghamshire
- Noel Mobbs (1878–1959), founder of Slough Estates
- Ralph Mobbs, Australian neurosurgeon

== See also ==
- Dobbs (surname)
- Hobbs (surname)
