= Elizabeth Akers Allen =

American poet and journalist (1832–1911)

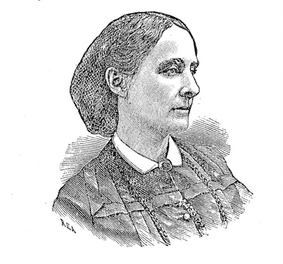
- c. 1881
- Born: Elizabeth Anne Chase; October 9, 1832; Strong, Maine, U.S.
- Died: August 7, 1911 (aged 78); Tuckahoe, New York
- Occupations: poet, journalist
- Spouses: Marshall S. M. Taylor (m. 1851) Benjamin Paul Akers (m. 1860) Elijah M. Allen (m. 1865)
- Children: Florence Percy McIntyre
- Writing career
- Language: English

Elizabeth Akers Allen (pen name, Florence Percy; October 9, 1832 – August 7, 1911) was an American poet and journalist. Her early poems appeared over the signature of "Florence Percy", and many of them were first published in the Portland Transcript. She came to Portland, Maine in 1855, and a volume of her fugitive poems appeared in that city just before her marriage to sculptor Paul Akers, whom she accompanied to Italy, and buried there. For several years, she was on the editorial staff of the Portland Advertiser. She wrote for many leading magazines, and several editions of her collected poems were published. She later resided in Ridgewood, New Jersey for several years.

== Early life ==
Elizabeth Anne Chase was born in 1832 in Strong, Maine. Her mother died when she was an infant, and her father moved the family to Farmington, where she attended Farmington Academy.

Her earliest poems are said to have been published when she was between 12 and 15 years old, under the pen name "Florence Percy".

== Career ==
In 1855, using her pen name, Allen published her first book of poetry, Forest Buds from the Woods of Maine. She started contributing poems to the Atlantic Monthly in 1858. In 1866, she published her second collection, Poems, under the name of "Elizabeth Akers". All subsequent volumes were published under the name "Elizabeth Akers Allen".

For much of her career, Allen earned her living partly as a journalist. The success of her first book allowed her to travel in Europe in 1859–60. While in Europe she served as a correspondent for the Portland Transcript and the Boston Evening Gazette. In 1874, she moved to Portland, Maine, where she spent seven years as the literary editor of the Daily Advertiser. She was a member of the professional women's club Sorosis, which had many writer members.

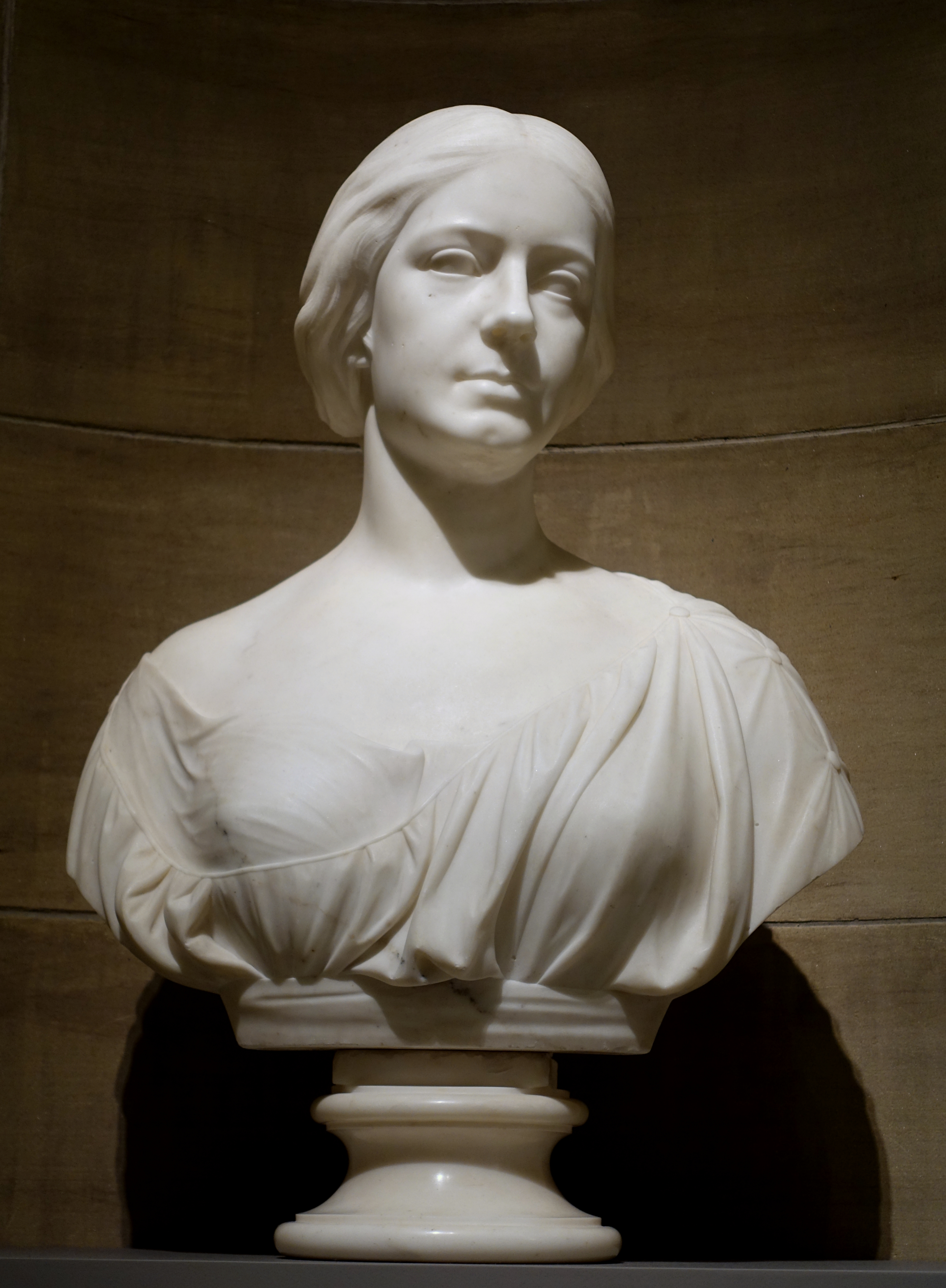
Bust of Elizabeth Akers Allen by her husband Benjamin Paul Akers, c. 1860

Allen is best known for the first couplet of her sentimental poem "Rock me to sleep" (1859), which was written during her time in Europe and first published in the Saturday Evening Post of Philadelphia, Pennsylvania. Though it is not considered her finest work, it was very popular during the American Civil War and quoted in the (unpublished) manuscript Mark Twain's No. 44, The Mysterious Stranger. For some years, Allen was forced to dispute its authorship with a number of claimants after the poem was set to music by Ernest Leslie and became a hit song. The first couplet runs:

Backward, turn backward, O time, in thy flight;

Make me a child again, just for to-night.

Composer Kate Lucy Ward also set Allen's poem Do Not Look Long at Life's Sorrow to music.

During the Civil War, in 1863, Allen had an appointment as a government clerk in the War Office in Washington, D.C., and also worked as a nurse.

== Personal life ==
In 1851, Allen married Marshall S. M. Taylor, but he abandoned her and their infant daughter, Florence Percy McIntyre and the couple were divorced in 1857. Then, she married Paul Akers, a Maine sculptor whom she had met in Rome, in 1860; he died of tuberculosis in 1861.

Thirdly, in 1865 or 1866, she married Elijah M. Allen and they lived in Richmond, Virginia, and Ridgewood, New Jersey, before settling in New York City.

== Death and legacy ==
Allen moved to Tuckahoe, New York in 1881 and died there in 1911.

Her papers are held by Colby College and the Maine Women Writers Collection at the University of New England.

== Selected publications ==
- Forest Buds from the Woods of Maine (1855, as Florence Percy)
- Poems (1866, as Elizabeth Akers)
- Queen Catharine's Rose (1885)
- The Silver Bridge, and Other Poems (1885)
- Two Saints (1888)
- The High-Top Sweeting, and Other Poems (1891)
- The Proud Lady of Stavoven (1897)
- The Ballad of the Bronx (1901)
- The Sunset Song, and Other Verses (1902)
