= Kate Lucy Ward =

British composer

Catherine Lucy Ward Bridgen Carter (29 April 1829 – 20 October 1915), was a British composer, teacher, and vocalist. She published her music under the name Kate Lucy Ward.

Ward was born in Highworth, Wiltshire, the fifth daughter of Isaiah, a painter, and Anne Ward. She had five sisters, Lydia Atmore, Anne, Helen Rose, Frances "Fanny" Agnes, and Adelaide, and younger brothers Henry Isaiah, Jabez Paul, and Francis. She was baptised in a non-conformist church in 1829, but was baptised into the Church of England in 1846. She studied at the Royal Academy of Music in London. Felix Mendelssohn praised her compositions during one of his visits to England.

In 1886, she married Alfred Thomas Bridgen Carter. She died in Richmond, Surrey in 1915.

Ward's music was published by A. Hammond & Co. Her compositions include:

Theatre

- music for small stage productions
- The Tempest (text by James T. Fields)

Vocal

- "Ah, My Heart is Weary"
- "At the Gate"
- "Bell of the Wreck"
- "Do Not Look at Life's Long Sorrow" (text by Adelaide A. Procter)
- "Lock of Brown Hair"
- "Love is Timid" (text by Daniel Weir)
- "Mother, the Winds are at Play"
- "O Loving Eyes" (text by Florence Percy)
- "Poppies Pale on Thy Pillow Weep" (text by Florence Percy)
- "Silver Moth"
- "True Hearts"
- "True Song" (text by Florence Percy)
- "Warrior's Grave"
- "Watching"
