= Benjamin Paul Akers =

American sculptor

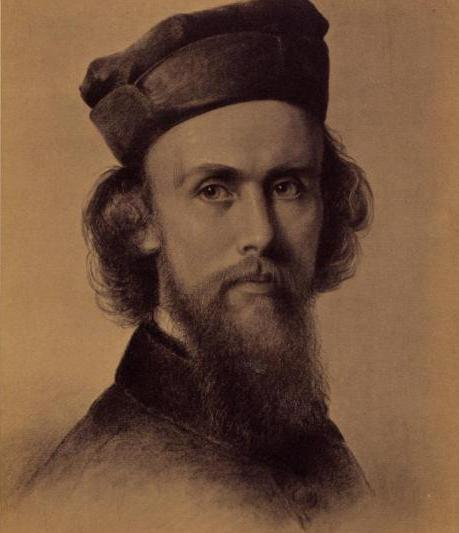
- Portrait of Paul Akers
- Born: July 10, 1825; Westbrook, Maine, U.S.
- Died: May 21, 1861 (aged 35); Philadelphia, Pennsylvania, U.S.
- Known for: Sculpture
- Awards: Commemorative Silver Medal in 1854
- Patrons: Samuel Appleton and John Neal

Signature of Paul Akers

Benjamin Paul Akers (July 10, 1825 – May 21, 1861) was an American sculptor from Maine.

== Early life ==
He was born in 1825 in rural Saccarappa, Maine, into a large and indigent family. When his father, Deacon Akers, moved the family from Saccarappa to Salmon Falls on the Saco River, he started a wood-turning mill. For six years the young Akers worked in his father's mill, where he invented beautiful patterns and "turned" toys. His brother, Charles "Carl" Akers, was also a sculptor and crayon portrait artist. He wrote articles on art for the Atlantic Monthly and also The Crayon, a short-lived New York art magazine in the mid-19th century. Akers spent the winter of 1849 in Boston learning the art of plaster casting with the sculptor Joseph Carew. In 1850 he opened a studio in Portland, Maine. He received a "Commemorative Silver Medal" in the 1854 Exhibition and Fair of the Maine Charitable Mechanic Association. The award was for his bas relief called Peace. In 1855, at age 30, he went to Rome, Italy where he worked for several years.

His experience in Italy and its revelation to his immature art-spirit he discloses in a letter written in 1853:

"I was thrown at once from a world where not in all my life had I seen art, although I lived there with my own shadowy creations—not strong, for I knew not the mighty or the feeble—thrown at once into a world where all was art. All around me, on earth, in the far heavens, were multitudes of forms, all silent but all demanding place; and none might help me, none to say 'here' or 'there'; I only in this mighty realm to appoint, to assign. I was set down in the Louvre a boy from the woods of that new world, no idle spectator."

== Career ==
Patron John Neal claimed Akers was "the first person, man or woman, that ever tried to model anything in the shape of a head" in Portland, Maine. Neal provided Akers a studio space and commissioned his first bust. Among his works are busts of Edward Everett and Henry Wadsworth Longfellow, a head of John Milton and The Dead Pearl Diver, on display at the Portland Museum of Art. Nathaniel Hawthorne described Dead Pearl Diver as an important work of the protagonist, Kenyon, in his novel The Marble Faun, acknowledging his debt to Akers in the introduction. Neal lamented his passing, claiming that "had he lived a few years longer, he would have built up a reputation for himself and his beloved country, well worth coveting.

He planned a free gallery of art for New York, to contain copies in marble of the chief works of ancient art, but in the midst of his work and plans his health failed and he returned home in 1858, and the next year started for Rome, where after his arrival he entered upon the execution of a commission from August Belmont of a statue of Commodore Perry for Central Park, New York, which was left unfinished.

== Marriage and children ==
In 1858 Akers met Elizabeth Taylor Allen a young mother, journalist and poet, and they married in August 1860 in Hollis. Their only child, Gertrude Rothermel, died in infancy. Akers died in Philadelphia, Pennsylvania on May 21, 1861, from tuberculosis. He is buried in Portland's Evergreen Cemetery.

== Gallery ==
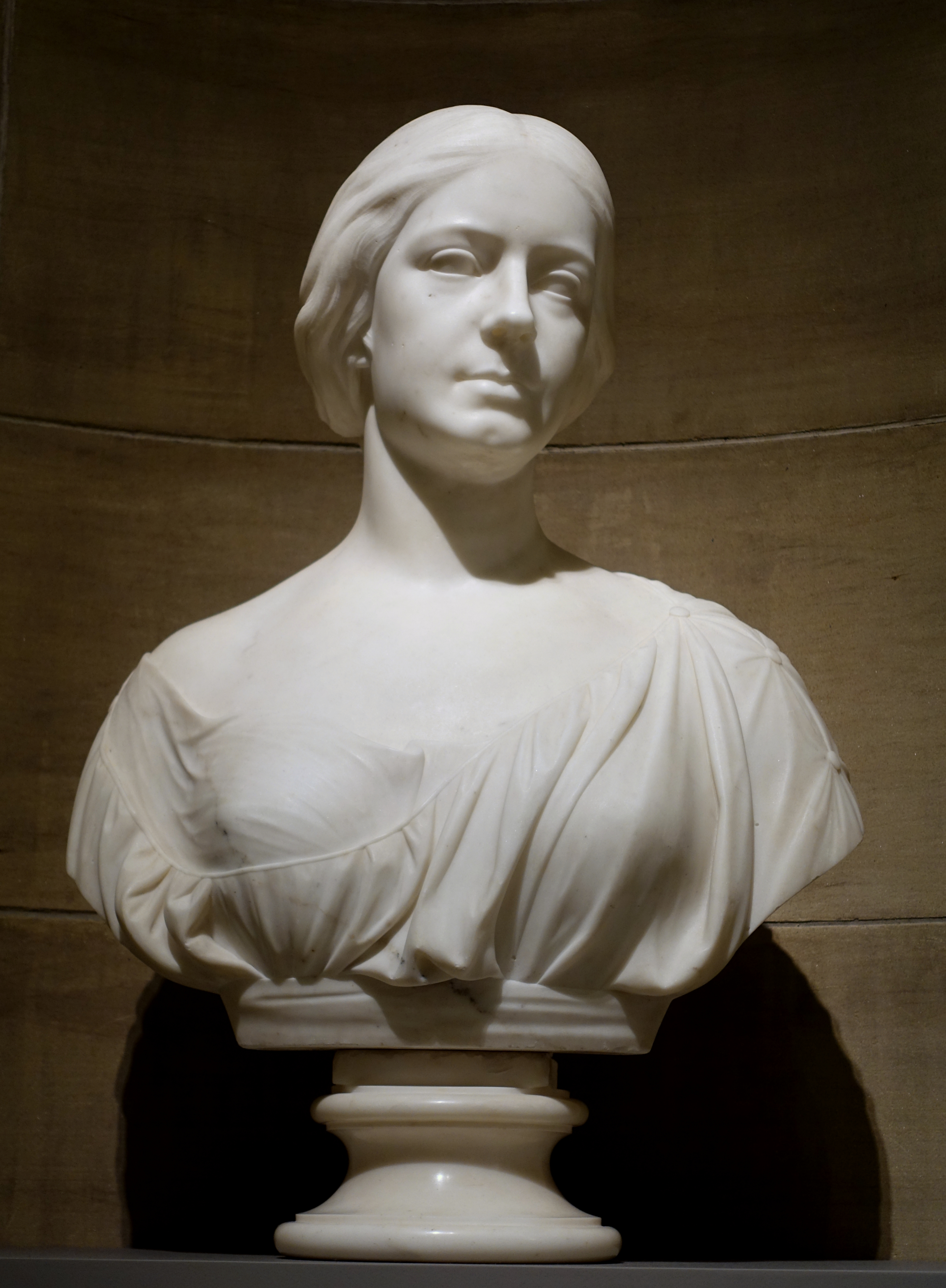
Elizabeth Ann Chase Taylor Akers Allen by Benjamin Paul Akers, c. 1860, in the Portland Museum of Art

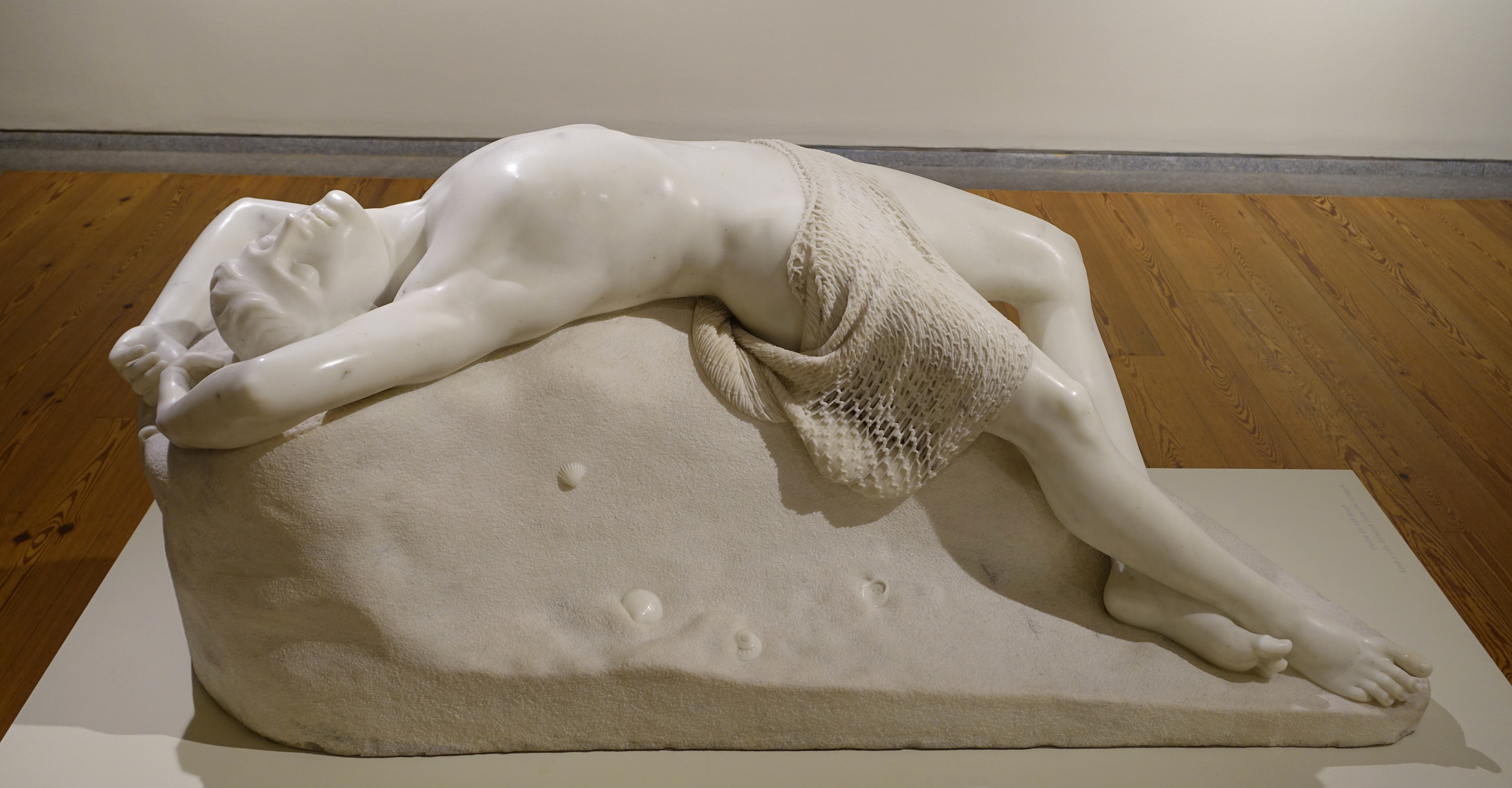
The Dead Pearl Diver by Benjamin Paul Akers. Portland Museum of Art

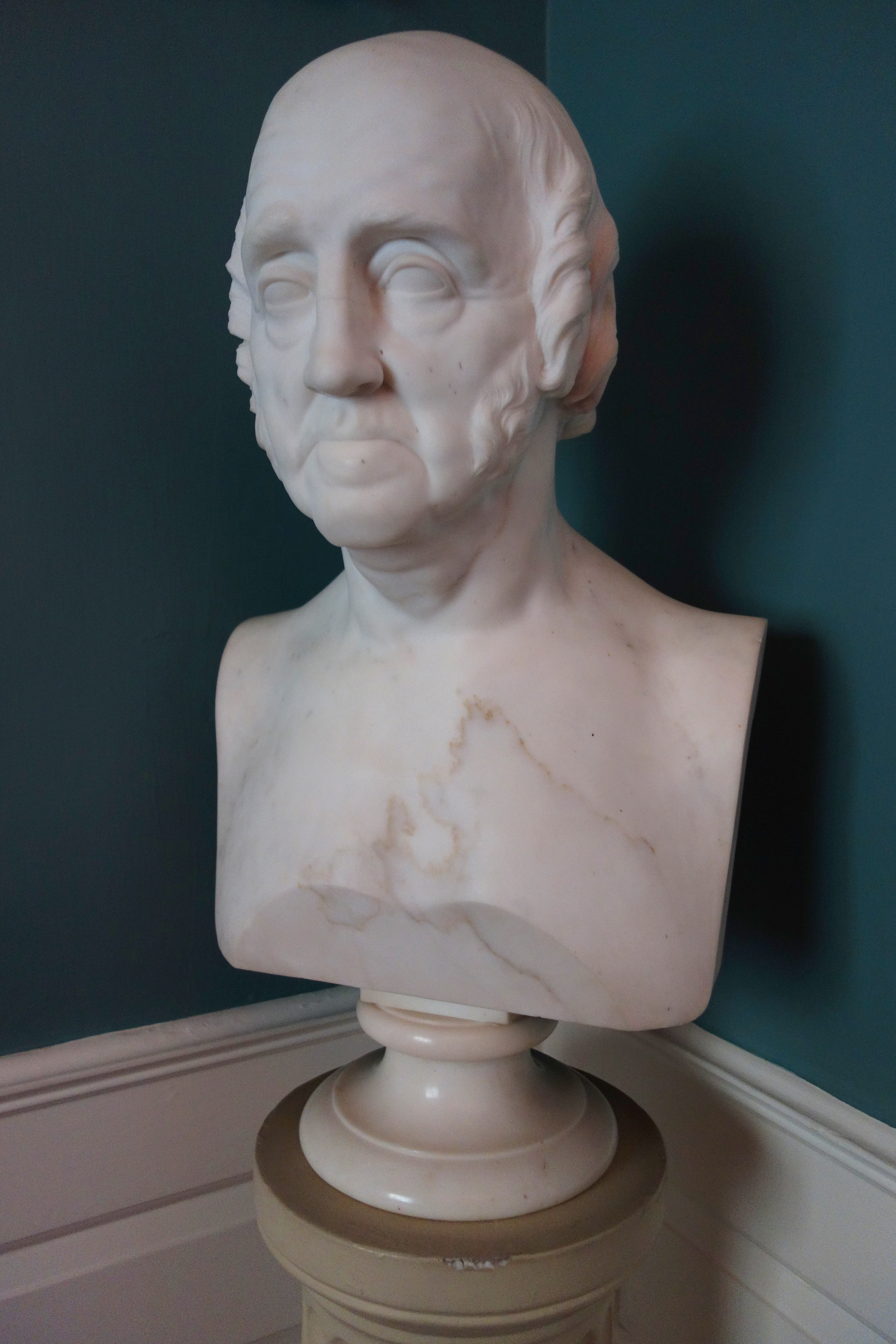
Samuel Appleton by Benjamin Paul Akers - Longfellow National Historic Site - DSC04802

== Collections ==
Collections:

- Boston Museum of Fine Art, Boston, Massachusetts
- Harvard University Art Museums, Massachusetts
- Portland Museum of Art, Maine

== Books about Akers ==
- Akers, Benjamin Paul by Thomas William Herringshaw
- Akers, Benjamin Paul, article in National Cyclopedia of American Biography, Vol. 6
- Akers, Benjamin Paul, book by George C. Groce
- The Brick House and Its People, book ca. 1930 by Janet Webb Hobbs
- Akers Brothers: brief sketch concerning those American artists, book ca. 1900 by Franklin Staples
