= Horace Williams =

Welsh footballer

Personal information
- Date of birth: 1900
- Place of birth: Pembroke, Wales
- Date of death: 29 October 1960 (aged 59–60)
- Position: Inside forward

Senior career*
Years	Team	Apps	(Gls)
- Liverpool Regiment
- St Johnstone
1919–1921	Hibernian	26	(3)
1921–1922	Dundee Hibernian	24	(13)
1922–1923	Gillingham	26	(10)
1923	Wrexham	0	(0)
- Mold
1926–1927	New Brighton	46	(38)
1927–1928	Blackpool	5	(3)
- Peterborough & Fletton United
- Macclesfield Town
- Caernarvon Athletic
- Lovells Athletic
- Hereford United
- Amiens
- Tunbridge Wells Rangers
1931	Abergele		

Managerial career
- 1930: ZAC Zwolle
- 1931–1933: Luzern
- * Club domestic league appearances and goals

Horace F. Williams (1900 – 29 October 1960) was a Welsh professional footballer.

Williams began his senior career in Scotland, playing for St Johnstone and then Hibernian. He joined Dundee Hibernian in July 1921 for a fee of £30. After scoring 13 goals in 25 appearances, he was transferred to Gillingham in March 1922, having been transfer listed in December for £200. He finished as Dundee Hibs' top scorer despite leaving before the end of the season.

Williams went on to make a total of over 70 English Football League appearances for Gillingham, New Brighton and Blackpool.
