= 1924–25 Tranmere Rovers F.C. season =

Tranmere Rovers F.C.
1924–25 season
- Manager: Bert Cooke
- Stadium: Prenton Park
- Third Division North: 21st
- FA Cup: Fifth Qualifying Round
Team colours

Tranmere Rovers F.C. played the 1924–25 season in the Football League Third Division North. It was their fourth season of league football, and they finished 21st of 22. They reached the Fifth Qualifying Round of the FA Cup.

== Football League ==
Pos	Team	Pld	W	D	L	GF	GA	GAv	Pts	Qualification
18	Doncaster Rovers	42	14	10	18	54	65	0.831	38	
19	Walsall	42	13	11	18	44	53	0.830	37	
20	Hartlepools United	42	12	11	19	45	63	0.714	35	
21	Tranmere Rovers	42	14	4	24	59	78	0.756	32	Re-elected
22	Rotherham County	42	7	7	28	42	88	0.477	21	Re-elected as Rotherham United

Source: rsssf.com
