= 1925–26 Tranmere Rovers F.C. season =

Tranmere Rovers F.C.
1925–26 season
- Manager: Bert Cooke
- Stadium: Prenton Park
- Third Division North: 7th
- FA Cup: First Round
Team colours

The 1925–26 Tranmere Rovers F.C. season was the football team's fifth season in the Football League Third Division North. They finished 7th of 22 teams in the league, and reached the First Round of the FA Cup.

== Football League ==
Pos	Team	Pld	W	D	L	GF	GA	GAv	Pts
5	Halifax Town	42	17	11	14	53	50	1.060	45
6	Hartlepools United	42	18	8	16	82	73	1.123	44
7	Tranmere Rovers	42	19	6	17	73	83	0.880	44
8	Nelson	42	16	11	15	89	71	1.254	43
9	Ashington	42	16	11	15	70	62	1.129	43
