= 1927–28 Tranmere Rovers F.C. season =

Tranmere Rovers F.C.
1927–28 season
- Manager: Bert Cooke
- Stadium: Prenton Park
- Third Division North: 5th
- FA Cup: Third Round
Team colours

Tranmere Rovers F.C. played the 1927–28 season in the Football League Third Division North. It was their seventh season of league football, and they finished 5th of 22. They reached the Third Round of the FA Cup.

== Football League ==
Pos	Team	Pld	W	D	L	GF	GA	GAv	Pts
3	Stockport County	42	23	8	11	89	51	1.745	54
4	Doncaster Rovers	42	23	7	12	80	44	1.818	53
5	Tranmere Rovers	42	22	9	11	105	72	1.458	53
6	Bradford City	42	18	12	12	85	60	1.417	48
7	Darlington	42	21	5	16	89	74	1.203	47

Source: rsssf.com
