= 1932–33 Tranmere Rovers F.C. season =

Tranmere Rovers F.C.
1932–33 season
- Manager: Bert Cooke
- Stadium: Prenton Park
- Third Division North: 11th
- FA Cup: Fourth Round
Team colours

Tranmere Rovers F.C. played the 1932–33 season in the Football League Third Division North. It was their 12th season of league football, and they finished 11th of 22. They reached the Fourth Round of the FA Cup.

== Football League ==
Pos	Team	Pld	W	D	L	GF	GA	GAv	Pts
9	Barrow	42	18	7	17	60	60	1.000	43
10	Crewe Alexandra	42	20	3	19	80	84	0.952	43
11	Tranmere Rovers	42	17	8	17	70	66	1.061	42
12	Southport	42	17	7	18	70	67	1.045	41
13	Accrington Stanley	42	15	10	17	78	76	1.026	40

Source: rsssf.com
