= 1928–29 Tranmere Rovers F.C. season =

Tranmere Rovers F.C.
1928–29 season
- Manager: Bert Cooke
- Stadium: Prenton Park
- Third Division North: 7th
- FA Cup: Second Round
Team colours

Tranmere Rovers F.C. played the 1928–29 season in the Football League Third Division North. It was their eighth season of league football, and they finished 7th of 22. They reached the Second Round of the FA Cup.

== Football League ==
Pos	Team	Pld	W	D	L	GF	GA	GAv	Pts
5	Doncaster Rovers	42	20	10	12	76	66	1.152	50
6	Lincoln City	42	21	6	15	91	67	1.358	48
7	Tranmere Rovers	42	22	3	17	79	77	1.026	47
8	Carlisle United	42	19	8	15	86	77	1.117	46
9	Crewe Alexandra	42	18	8	16	80	68	1.176	44

Source: rsssf.com
