= 1929–30 Tranmere Rovers F.C. season =

Tranmere Rovers F.C.
1929–30 season
- Manager: Bert Cooke
- Stadium: Prenton Park
- Third Division North: 12th
- FA Cup: First Round
Team colours

Tranmere Rovers F.C. played the 1929–30 season in the Football League Third Division North. It was their ninth season of league football, and they finished 12th of 22. They reached the first round of the FA Cup.

== Football League ==
| Pos | Team | Pld | W | D | L | GF | GA | GAv | Pts |
|---|---|---|---|---|---|---|---|---|---|
| 10 | Rochdale | 42 | 18 | 7 | 17 | 89 | 91 | 0.978 | 43 |
| 11 | Crewe Alexandra | 42 | 17 | 8 | 17 | 82 | 71 | 1.155 | 42 |
| 12 | Tranmere Rovers | 42 | 16 | 9 | 17 | 83 | 86 | 0.965 | 41 |
| 13 | New Brighton | 42 | 16 | 8 | 18 | 69 | 79 | 0.873 | 40 |
| 14 | Doncaster Rovers | 42 | 15 | 9 | 18 | 62 | 69 | 0.899 | 39 |

Source: rsssf.com
