= George Ayres =

English footballer

Personal information
- Date of birth: 1899
- Place of birth: Sutton, London, England
- Position: Forward

Senior career*
Years	Team	Apps	(Gls)
- RAF
1922–1923	Charlton Athletic	33	(5)
1923–1925	Sheffield Wednesday	27	(11)
1926–1927	Blackpool	33	(4)
- * Club domestic league appearances and goals

George A. Ayres (born 1899, date of death unknown) was an English footballer who played in The Football League for Charlton Athletic, Sheffield Wednesday and Blackpool. He was born in Sutton, London, England.
