= Syd Tuffnell =

English footballer

Personal information
- Full name: Sydney James Tuffnell
- Date of birth: 11 October 1904
- Place of birth: Sheffield, England
- Date of death: 1990 (aged 85–86)
- Position: Wing half

Senior career*
Years	Team	Apps	(Gls)
- Worksop Town
1927–1934	Blackpool	90	(4)
1934–1937	Wigan Athletic	108	(9)
- Buxton
- * Club domestic league appearances and goals

Sydney James Tuffnell (11 October 1904 – 1990) was an English professional footballer. Born in Sheffield, he joined Blackpool from Worksop Town in 1927, making 90 Football League appearances for the club.

He was signed by Wigan Athletic in August 1934. He spent three seasons at the club, scoring nine goals in 108 Cheshire League appearances. In June 1937, he joined Buxton.
