= Syd Brookes =

English footballer

Personal information
- Full name: Sydney Brookes
- Date of birth: 19 July 1907
- Place of birth: Ashby-de-la-Zouch, England
- Position: Inside left

Senior career*
Years	Team	Apps	(Gls)
- Scunthorpe & Lindsey United
1927–1931	Blackpool	26	(4)
1932–1933	Swindon Town	30	(6)
1933–19??	Scarborough		
- * Club domestic league appearances and goals

Sydney Brookes (born 19 July 1907) was an English professional footballer. An inside left, he played for two Football League clubs during the 1920s and 1930s.

== Career ==
Ashby-de-la-Zouch-born Brookes began his career with Scunthorpe & Lindsey United, before turning professional with Blackpool in 1927. He made 26 League appearances and scored four goals in his four seasons with the club.

In 1932 he joined Swindon Town, making 33 appearances and scoring seven goals, before finishing his career at Scarborough.
