= 1937–38 Tranmere Rovers F.C. season =

Tranmere Rovers F.C.
1937–38 season
- Manager: Jim Knowles
- Stadium: Prenton Park
- Third Division North: 1st (Promoted)
- FA Cup: Third Round
Team colours

Tranmere Rovers F.C. played the 1937–38 season in the Football League Third Division North. It was their 17th season of league football, and they finished first of 22, and were promoted. They reached the Third Round of the FA Cup. This remains Tranmere's sole championship in the Football League.

== Football League ==
Pos	Team	Pld	W	D	L	GF	GA	GAv	Pts	Promotion
1	Tranmere Rovers (C, P)	42	23	10	9	81	41	1.976	56	Promotion to the Second Division
2	Doncaster Rovers	42	21	12	9	74	49	1.510	54	
3	Hull City	42	20	13	9	80	43	1.860	53	
4	Oldham Athletic	42	19	13	10	67	46	1.457	51	
5	Gateshead	42	20	11	11	84	59	1.424	51	

Source: rsssf.com
(C) Champions; (P) Promoted
