= Arthur Purdy =

English footballer (1904–1979)

Personal information
- Full name: Arthur Purdy
- Date of birth: 23 July 1904
- Place of birth: Evenwood, England
- Date of death: 1979 (aged 83–84)
- Position: Goalkeeper

Senior career*
Years	Team	Apps	(Gls)
1920–1921	Evenwood Juniors		
1921–1922	Cockfield St Mary's		
1922–1923	Coundon United		
1923–1924	Tottenham Hotspur	0	(0)
1925–1926	Luton Town	24	(0)
1926–1927	Southend United	2	(0)
1927–1928	Durham City	27	(0)
1928–1929	Blackpool	31	(0)
1929–1930	Colwyn Bay United		
1930–1933	Norwich City	11	(0)
1933–1935	Fleetwood		
1935	Evenwood Comrades		
1936	Throckley Welfare		
Total		95	(0)
- * Club domestic league appearances and goals

Arthur Purdy (23 July 1904 – 1979) was an English footballer who played in the Football League for Blackpool, Durham City, Luton Town, Norwich City and Southend United.
