= 1926–27 Tranmere Rovers F.C. season =

Tranmere Rovers F.C.
1926–27 season
- Manager: Bert Cooke
- Stadium: Prenton Park
- Third Division North: 9th
- FA Cup: First Round
Team colours

Tranmere Rovers F.C. played the 1926–27 season in the Football League Third Division North. It was their sixth season of league football, and they finished 9th of 22. They reached the First Round of the FA Cup.

== Football League ==
Pos	Team	Pld	W	D	L	GF	GA	GAv	Pts
7	Chesterfield	42	21	5	16	92	68	1.353	47
8	Doncaster Rovers	42	18	11	13	81	65	1.246	47
9	Tranmere Rovers	42	19	8	15	85	67	1.269	46
10	New Brighton	42	18	10	14	79	67	1.179	46
11	Lincoln City	42	15	12	15	90	78	1.154	42

Source: rsssf.com
