= 1936–37 Tranmere Rovers F.C. season =

Tranmere Rovers F.C.
1936–37 season
- Manager: Jack Carr; Jim Knowles
- Stadium: Prenton Park
- Third Division North: 19th
- FA Cup: First Round
Team colours

Tranmere Rovers F.C. played the 1936–37 season in the Football League Third Division North. It was their 16th season of league football, and they finished 19th of 22. They reached the First Round of the FA Cup.

== Football League ==
Pos	Team	Pld	W	D	L	GF	GA	GAv	Pts	Promotion or relegation
17	Rotherham United	42	14	7	21	78	91	0.857	35	
18	Rochdale	42	13	9	20	69	86	0.802	35	
19	Tranmere Rovers	42	12	9	21	71	88	0.807	33	
20	Crewe Alexandra	42	10	12	20	55	83	0.663	32	
21	Gateshead	42	11	10	21	63	98	0.643	32	Re-elected

Source: rsssf.com
Rules for classification: 1) Points; 2) Goal average; 3) Goals scored
