= 1923–24 Tranmere Rovers F.C. season =

Tranmere Rovers F.C.
1923–24 season
- Manager: Bert Cooke
- Stadium: Prenton Park
- Third Division North: 12th
- FA Cup: Sixth Qualifying Round
Team colours

Tranmere Rovers F.C. played the 1923–24 season in the Football League Third Division North. It was their third season of league football, and they finished 12th of 22. They reached the Sixth Qualifying Round of the FA Cup.

== Football League ==
Pos	Team	Pld	W	D	L	GF	GA	GAv	Pts
10	Wigan Borough	42	14	14	14	55	53	1.038	42
11	Grimsby Town	42	14	13	15	49	47	1.043	41
12	Tranmere Rovers	42	13	15	14	51	60	0.850	41
13	Accrington Stanley	42	16	8	18	48	61	0.787	40
14	Halifax Town	42	15	10	17	42	59	0.712	40

Source: rsssf.com
