= 1933–34 Tranmere Rovers F.C. season =

Tranmere Rovers F.C.
1933–34 season
- Manager: Bert Cooke
- Stadium: Prenton Park
- Third Division North: 7th
- FA Cup: Fourth Round
Team colours

Tranmere Rovers F.C. played the 1933–34 season in the Football League Third Division North. It was their 13th season of league football, and they finished 7th of 22. They reached the Fourth Round of the FA Cup.

== Football League ==
Pos	Team	Pld	W	D	L	GF	GA	GAv	Pts
5	Doncaster Rovers	42	22	9	11	83	61	1.361	53
6	Wrexham	42	23	5	14	102	73	1.397	51
7	Tranmere Rovers	42	20	7	15	84	63	1.333	47
8	Barrow	42	19	9	14	116	94	1.234	47
9	Halifax Town	42	20	4	18	80	91	0.879	44

Source: rsssf.com
