= 1931–32 Tranmere Rovers F.C. season =

Tranmere Rovers F.C.
1931–32 season
- Manager: Bert Cooke
- Stadium: Prenton Park
- Third Division North: 4th
- FA Cup: Third Round
Team colours

Tranmere Rovers F.C. played the 1931–32 season in the Football League Third Division North. It was their 11th season of league football, and they finished 4th of 21. They reached the Third Round of the FA Cup.

== Football League ==
Pos	Team	Pld	W	D	L	GF	GA	GAv	Pts
2	Gateshead	40	25	7	8	94	48	1.958	57
3	Chester	40	21	8	11	78	60	1.300	50
4	Tranmere Rovers	40	19	11	10	107	58	1.845	49
5	Barrow	40	24	1	15	86	59	1.458	49
6	Crewe Alexandra	40	21	6	13	95	66	1.439	48

Source: rsssf.com
