= Fred Mobbs =

English footballer

Personal information
- Full name: Frederick Wilfred Mobbs
- Date of birth: 29 July 1904
- Place of birth: Gainsborough, England
- Date of death: 1973 (aged 68–69)
- Position: Goalkeeper

Senior career*
Years	Team	Apps	(Gls)
1925–1927	Gainsborough Trinity		
1927–1928	Blackpool	24	(0)
1928–1930	Aldershot Town		
1930–1931	Grantham		
1931–1932	Gainsborough Trinity		
1932–1933	Newark Town		
Total		24	(0)
- * Club domestic league appearances and goals

Frederick Wilfred Mobbs (29 July 1904 – 1979) was an English footballer who played in the Football League for Blackpool.
