= 1930–31 Tranmere Rovers F.C. season =

Tranmere Rovers F.C.
1930–31 season
- Manager: Bert Cooke
- Stadium: Prenton Park
- Third Division North: 4th
- FA Cup: First Round
Team colours

Tranmere Rovers F.C. played the 1930–31 season in the Football League Third Division North. It was their tenth season of league football, and they finished 4th of 22 teams. They reached the First Round of the FA Cup.

== Football League ==
Pos	Team	Pld	W	D	L	GF	GA	GAv	Pts
2	Lincoln City	42	25	7	10	102	59	1.729	57
3	Wrexham	42	21	12	9	94	62	1.516	54
4	Tranmere Rovers	42	24	6	12	111	74	1.500	54
5	Southport	42	22	9	11	88	56	1.571	53
6	Hull City	42	20	10	12	99	55	1.800	50

Source: rsssf.com
