= 1934–35 Tranmere Rovers F.C. season =

Tranmere Rovers F.C.
1934–35 season
- Manager: Bert Cooke; Jack Carr
- Stadium: Prenton Park
- Third Division North: 12th
- FA Cup: First Round
Team colours

Tranmere Rovers F.C. played the 1934–35 season in the Football League Third Division North. It was their 14th season of league football, and they finished 12th of 22. They reached the First Round of the FA Cup.

The first man to hold a position at Tranmere equivalent to what is today referred to as a manager was Bert Cooke, who was appointed manager in 1912, though the directors continued to choose the team for each game. Cooke stayed in charge for 23 years, the longest spell of any manager at the club. He oversaw the club's victory in the Lancashire Combination in 1914, promotion to the Central League in 1919 and, as founder members of Division Three North, their first Football League match on 27 August 1921. He also developed a string of talented local youngsters, including Dixie Dean and Pongo Waring. However, in 1935, Cooke's career ended in discredit; following illegal payments to directors and players, he was sacked and replaced by Jack Carr.

== Football League ==
| Pos | Team | Pld | W | D | L | GF | GA | GAv | Pts |
|---|---|---|---|---|---|---|---|---|---|
| 4 | Lincoln City | 42 | 22 | 7 | 13 | 87 | 58 | 1.500 | 51 |
| 5 | Darlington | 42 | 21 | 9 | 12 | 80 | 59 | 1.356 | 51 |
| 6 | Tranmere Rovers | 42 | 20 | 11 | 11 | 74 | 55 | 1.345 | 51 |
| 7 | Stockport County | 42 | 22 | 3 | 17 | 90 | 72 | 1.250 | 47 |
| 8 | Mansfield Town | 42 | 19 | 9 | 14 | 75 | 62 | 1.210 | 47 |

Source: rsssf.com
