= 1935–36 Tranmere Rovers F.C. season =

Tranmere Rovers F.C.
1935–36 season
- Manager: Jack Carr
- Stadium: Prenton Park
- Third Division North: 12th
- FA Cup: First Round
Team colours

Tranmere Rovers F.C. played the 1935–36 season in the Football League Third Division North. It was their 15th season of league football, and they finished 12th of 22. They reached the first round of the FA Cup.

== Football League ==
| Pos | Team | Pld | W | D | L | GF | GA | GAv | Pts | Promotion or relegation |
|---|---|---|---|---|---|---|---|---|---|---|
| 1 | Chesterfield (C, P) | 42 | 24 | 12 | 6 | 92 | 39 | 2.359 | 60 | Promotion to the Second Division |
| 2 | Chester | 42 | 22 | 11 | 9 | 100 | 45 | 2.222 | 55 | |
| 3 | Tranmere Rovers | 42 | 22 | 11 | 9 | 93 | 58 | 1.603 | 55 | |
| 4 | Lincoln City | 42 | 22 | 9 | 11 | 91 | 51 | 1.784 | 53 | |
| 5 | Stockport County | 42 | 20 | 8 | 14 | 65 | 49 | 1.327 | 48 | |

Source: rsssf.com
(C) Champions; (P) Promoted
