= Bert Cooke =

English football manager

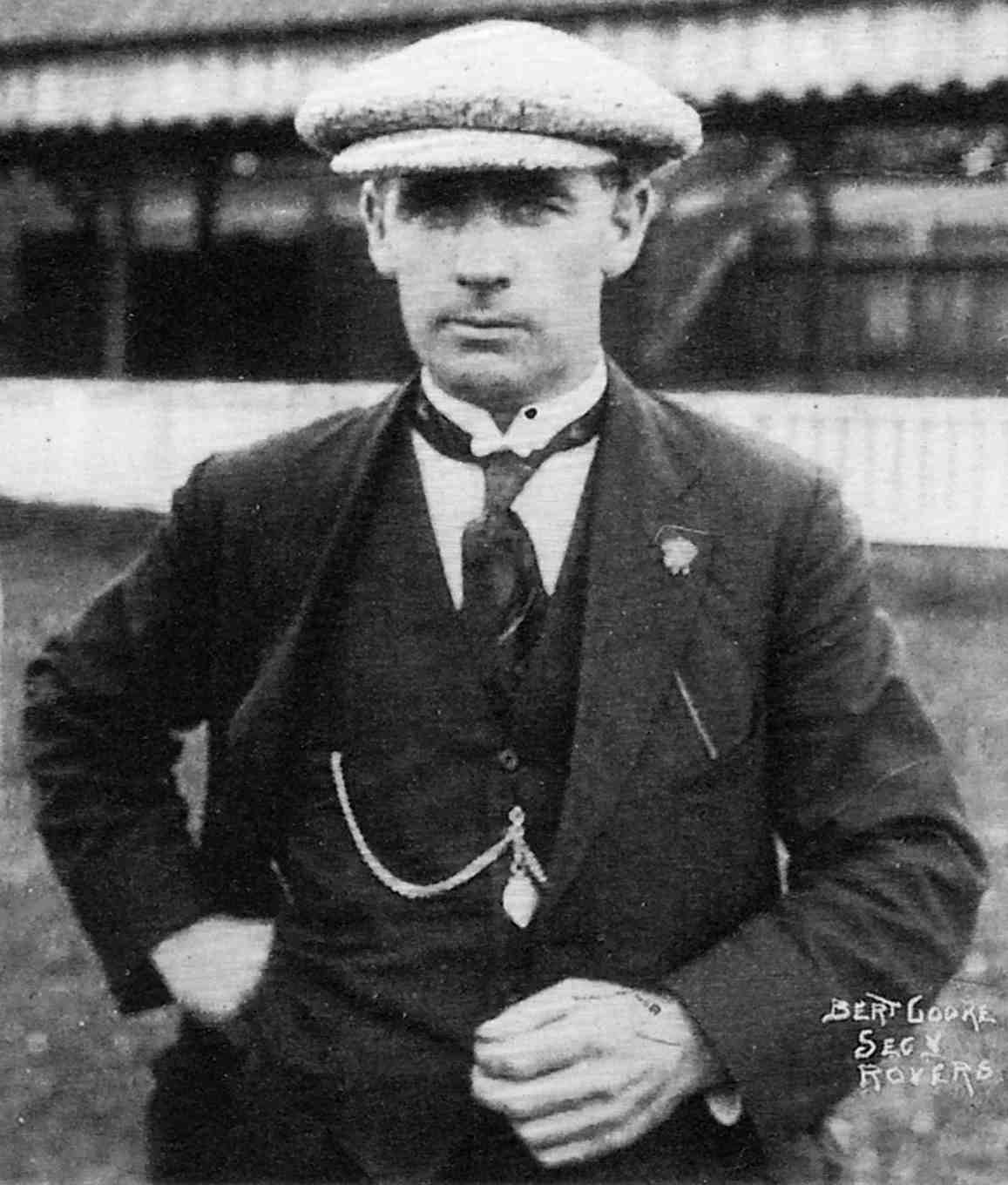
- Cooke in 1921

Personal information
- Full name: Herbert Michael Cooke
- Date of birth: 1882
- Place of birth: Birkenhead, England
- Date of death: 1959 (aged 76)
- Place of death: Wirral, England

Managerial career
- Years: Team
- 1912–1935: Tranmere Rovers

Herbert Michael Cooke was a football manager. He managed Tranmere Rovers from 1912 to 1935, the longest spell of any manager at the club. He oversaw their first Football League match in 1921.

== Management career ==
Born in Birkenhead in 1882, Cooke became manager of Tranmere in 1912, and stayed in charge for 23 years, the longest spell of any manager at the club.

In 1919, Tranmere were promoted to the Central League. Within a year, Division Three North was created and, in 1921, Cooke oversaw the club's first Football League match. A string of talented local youngsters were developed by Cooke before moving to First Division clubs - Dixie Dean, Ellis Rimmer, Pongo Waring and Nibbler Ridding.

In the 1934–35 season – Cooke's last in charge – Rovers led Division Three North for most of the campaign but, in the last few weeks, blew their promotion chance. They did however win the Welsh Cup that year. He left under acrimonious circumstances, amid FA enquiries into illegal payments to players to induce them to sign for Rovers and the dismissal of several directors. Cooke was replaced by former England international, Jackie Carr.

Cooke died in Wirral in 1959, aged 76.
