= Bill Bentley (footballer) =

English footballer (born 1947)

Personal information
- Full name: William John Bentley
- Date of birth: 21 October 1947 (age 79)
- Place of birth: Longton, Stoke-on-Trent, England
- Height: 5 ft 11 in (1.80 m)
- Position: Left-back

Youth career
- 1962–1964: Stoke City

Senior career*
Years	Team	Apps	(Gls)
1964–1968	Stoke City	48	(1)
1968–1977	Blackpool	296	(11)
1977–1980	Port Vale	95	(0)
1980–1981	Stafford Rangers	20	(1)
Total		459	(13)

International career
- England Youth

Managerial career
- 1979: Port Vale (caretaker)
- * Club domestic league appearances and goals

William John Bentley (born 21 October 1947) is an English former professional footballer who played as a left-back. He made 439 league appearances in a 15-year career in the Football League.

Beginning his career at Stoke City in 1964, he moved on to Blackpool in 1968. He spent the next nine years with Blackpool, helping them to win promotion out of the Second Division in 1969–70 and to lift the Anglo-Italian Cup in 1971. He spent 1977 to 1980 at Port Vale, also briefly serving the club as caretaker manager in 1979. He ended his career at non-League club Stafford Rangers in 1981.

== Early and later life ==
William John Bentley was born on 21 October 1947 in Longton, Stoke-on-Trent and attended St Gregory's School. He played for Stoke-on-Trent schoolboys, winning two consecutive national titles in a side that included Terry Alcock, Clint Boulton, John Woodward and Denis Smith. He went on to represent both Staffordshire and England at schoolboy level, and was also capped at England Youth level.

After retiring from football he became a window cleaner in the Trentham area of Stoke-on-Trent.

== Career ==
=== Stoke City ===
Bentley began his career as an apprentice with Stoke City, joining the club straight from school at age 15. He signed as a professional with the club in October 1964. He made five First Division appearances in 1965–66 and seven appearances in 1966–67, before breaking into Tony Waddington's first-team plans during the 1967–68 campaign, when he played a total of 37 games for the "Potters". The young defender's physique and temperament had won him comparisons to John Charles. However, Bentley fell out with Waddington after finding himself out of the first XI for an extended period.

=== Blackpool ===
On 9 January 1969, five months into the 1968–69 season, Bentley joined Stan Mortensen's Blackpool for £30,000. Two days later, he debuted for the club in a 3–2 home defeat by Charlton Athletic. The following season he helped the "Seasiders" win promotion to the First Division as runners-up of the Second Division under new manager Les Shannon. However, they were immediately relegated in 1970–71. He was part of the Blackpool team that won the Anglo-Italian Cup in 1971, beating Bologna in the final at the Stadio Renato Dall'Ara.

Blackpool finished sixth in 1971–72 under Bob Stokoe's stewardship, but reached the 1972 Anglo-Italian Cup final at the Stadio Olimpico, where they were beaten by Roma. They dropped to seventh place in 1972–73 under new boss Harry Potts, but reached the quarter-finals of the League Cup. Blackpool finished fifth in 1973–74, missing out on promotion by just three points. They again finished seventh in 1974–75, before falling to tenth in 1975–76. On 3 January 1976, Bentley scored a "stunning" winning goal against Burnley in the third round of the FA Cup, his only goal in eleven appearances in the competition for the club. Blackpool finished fifth in 1976–77 under new manager Allan Brown, finishing only four points behind promoted Chelsea. Bentley's final appearance for the club came on 7 May 1977, in a 1–1 draw at Hereford United. He made 296 league appearances and scored ten goals for Blackpool, for whom he was mostly used as a left-back but also had times playing in midfield. He returned to live in Staffordshire as his wife needed to look after her elderly father, and the Blackpool chairman agreed to let him leave on a free transfer in light of his eight years of service to the club. Hereford United had previously agreed to a £20,000 transfer fee, but insisted that all players live locally so the deal was called off.

It was close to eight years I spent with the club. It was brilliant. When I put the tangerine shirt on I grew another foot. I wasn't bothered about anyone else. The Blackpool supporters really took me to heart. Even when I go back now I'm always made very, very welcome. That's always stayed with me and it's something special.

— Bentley speaking of his eight years at Bloomfield Road.

=== Port Vale ===
In July 1977, he was sold to Port Vale as one of manager Roy Sproson's last signings. Upon his arrival at Vale Park, Bentley stated that "I am a Potteries lad and I want to play for the club. There is no question of me coming here to be put out to grass. I still think I have plenty to offer". He played 37 games in 1977–78, retaining his first-team place under new boss Bobby Smith, as the "Valiants" slipped out of the Third Division after losing 3–2 at Plymouth Argyle on the final day.

He made 34 appearances in the 1978–79 season, as new manager Dennis Butler took the club to a lowly finish of 16th in the Fourth Division. Bentley was placed in temporary charge of team affairs in December 1979 after newly appointed manager Alan Bloor unexpectedly resigned, and before a replacement in John McGrath was found. Despite playing 35 games in 1979–80, he did not get along with McGrath and was given a free transfer in May 1980.

=== Stafford Rangers ===
Bentley moved on to Stafford Rangers, with whom he finished his professional career in 1981, after making 20 Alliance Premier League appearances in the 1980–81 season. After Rangers he became the player-manager of Fenton British Legion and Foley.

== Style of play ==
Bentley, a former England Youth international, was known for being a tough-tackling defender. This was the source of the "Bill Bentley, Hatchet Man" chant that emanated from the stands during his time at Blackpool.

== Career statistics ==
=== Club ===
Appearances and goals by club, season and competition
Club	Season	League			FA Cup		League Cup		Other (Note: Includes Anglo-Italian Cup, Anglo-Scottish Cup, Texaco Cup, Watney Cup.)		Total	
Club	Season	Division	Apps	Goals	Apps	Goals	Apps	Goals	Apps	Goals	Apps	Goals
Stoke City	1965–66	First Division	5	0	0	0	0	0	—		5	0
Stoke City	1966–67	First Division	7	0	0	0	0	0	—		7	0
Stoke City	1967–68	First Division	32	1	1	0	4	1	—		37	2
Stoke City	1968–69	First Division	4	0	0	0	0	0	—		4	0
Stoke City	Total		48	1	1	0	4	1	0	0	53	2
Blackpool	1968–69	Second Division	17	0	0	0	0	0	—		17	0
Blackpool	1969–70	Second Division	33	1	3	0	2	1	—		38	2
Blackpool	1970–71	First Division	34	0	0	0	1	1	3	1	38	2
Blackpool	1971–72	Second Division	23	1	1	0	1	0	5	0	30	1
Blackpool	1972–73	Second Division	40	1	1	0	6	0	5	0	52	1
Blackpool	1973–74	Second Division	38	2	1	0	2	0	—		41	2
Blackpool	1974–75	Second Division	36	3	1	0	1	0	3	0	41	3
Blackpool	1975–76	Second Division	36	0	2	1	1	0	3	0	42	2
Blackpool	1976–77	Second Division	39	3	2	0	4	0	3	0	48	3
Blackpool	Total		296	11	11	1	18	2	22	1	347	15
Port Vale	1977–78	Third Division	32	0	2	0	3	0	—		37	0
Port Vale	1978–79	Fourth Division	31	0	1	0	2	0	—		34	0
Port Vale	1979–80	Fourth Division	32	0	1	0	2	0	—		35	0
Port Vale	Total		95	0	4	0	7	0	0	0	106	0
Career total			439	12	16	1	29	3	22	1	506	17

=== Managerial ===
Managerial record by team and tenure
Team	From	To	Record				
Team	From	To	P	W	D	L	Win %
Port Vale (caretaker)	2 December 1979	20 December 1979	1	0	0	1	0.0
Total			1	0	0	1	0.0

== Honours ==
Blackpool

- Football League Second Division second-place promotion: 1969–70
- Anglo-Italian Cup: 1971; runner-up: 1972
