= Terry Alcock =

English footballer (born 1946)

Personal information
- Full name: Terrence Alcock
- Date of birth: 9 December 1946 (age 79)
- Place of birth: Hanley, Stoke-on-Trent, England
- Height: 6 ft 1 in (1.85 m)
- Position: Defender

Youth career
- Wellington Road School

Senior career*
Years	Team	Apps	(Gls)
1963–1967	Port Vale	112	(0)
1967–1977	Blackpool	193	(21)
1971–1972	→ Bury (loan)	6	(1)
1976–1977	→ Blackburn Rovers (loan)	3	(1)
1977	Port Vale	4	(0)
1977	→ Portland Timbers (loan)	7	(2)
1978	Halifax Town	14	(2)
- Lancaster City
Total		339+	(27+)
- * Club domestic league appearances and goals

Terrence Alcock (born 9 December 1946) is an English former footballer. A defender, he played 330 league games in a 15-year career in the English Football League.

He played for Port Vale from 1963 to 1967 before spending nine years with Blackpool following a £30,000 transfer. He helped the "Seasiders" to win promotion out of the Second Division in 1969–70. Also, he featured in the club's Anglo-Italian Cup success in 1971. He made 112 league appearances for Port Vale and 191 for Blackpool. After 1976, he had short spells back at Port Vale, and then Halifax Town and Lancaster City. He also had short loan spells with Bury, Blackburn Rovers and American side Portland Timbers.

== Career ==
=== Port Vale ===
Alcock was born in Hanley and attended Wellington Road School, where he played as a goalkeeper before later converting into a versatile central defender. Starting his career at Third Division club Port Vale in 1963, he played two games in 1963–64, before he turned professional in September 1964 under Freddie Steele. He then featured 31 times in the 1964–65 season, as the "Valiants" were relegated into the Fourth Division. He made 46 appearances in 1965–66, as new boss Jackie Mudie struggled to keep Vale off the foot of the table; they eventually finished 19th, four points ahead of bottom club Wrexham. He played 45 games in 1966–67, picking up attention from higher profile clubs.

=== Blackpool ===
Alcock left Vale Park in August 1967, when he was signed by Blackpool manager Stan Mortensen, whose side were then playing in the Second Division, for a fee of £30,000, which was a Port Vale club record at the time. His new team missed out on promotion to the First Division in 1967–68 after they finished one point behind champions Ipswich Town and level on points with Queens Park Rangers, who had a superior goal average. They dropped to eighth in 1968–69, before winning promotion as runners-up in 1969–70 under the stewardship of Les Shannon. However, the new boss Bob Stokoe could not prevent the club from dropping straight back out of the top flight with a bottom-placed finish in 1970–71. Alcock was a member of the Blackpool team that won the 1971 Anglo-Italian Cup, beating Bologna 2–1 after extra time in the final at the Stadio Renato Dall'Ara on 12 June 1971. In the 1971–72 season he spent a short time on loan at Fourth Division club Bury, playing six league games and scoring one goal. Alcock played in the 1972 Anglo-Italian Cup, scoring in Blackpool's 10–0 victory over Lanerossi Vicenza on 10 June 1972 at Bloomfield Road, en route to Blackpool's appearance in the final. Alcock scored the "Seasiders"' goal as they lost out 3–1 to Roma at the Stadio Olimpico. Blackpool finished seventh in the second tier in 1972–73, before posting a fifth-place finish in 1973–74 under Harry Potts; they ended the campaign just two places and two points behind promoted Carlisle United. They then finished seventh in 1974–75 and tenth in 1975–76. In December 1976, he joined league rivals Blackburn Rovers on loan, playing three league and two FA Cup games. He played a total of 191 league games for the "Seasiders", scoring 21 goals.

=== Later career ===
He re-joined Port Vale in February 1977, who were now managed by former teammate Roy Sproson. However, he just played the one game in 1976–77. He then spent a short period on loan with North American Soccer League club Portland Timbers, scoring two goals in seven appearances in 1977. He returned to Burslem to replace an absent David Harris, and scored twice in three League Cup appearances in 1977–78. He joined Fourth Division club Halifax Town in 1978, and then later that same year moved into non-League football with Lancaster City, of the Northern Premier League, with whom he finished his playing career.

== Post-retirement ==
After retiring from football, Alcock became the licensee of the Blackpool Supporters Club at Bloomfield Road, before taking on similar positions at pubs in Burscough, Warton and then Wrea Green.

== Career statistics ==
Appearances and goals by club, season and competition
Club	Season	League			FA Cup		Other		Total	
Club	Season	Division	Apps	Goals	Apps	Goals	Apps	Goals	Apps	Goals
Port Vale	1963–64	Third Division	2	0	0	0	0	0	2	0
Port Vale	1964–65	Third Division	28	0	2	0	1	0	31	0
Port Vale	1965–66	Fourth Division	41	0	4	0	1	0	46	0
Port Vale	1966–67	Fourth Division	41	0	3	0	1	0	45	0
Port Vale	Total		112	0	9	0	3	0	124	0
Blackpool	1967–68	Second Division	6	0	0	0	0	0	6	0
Blackpool	1968–69	Second Division	15	1	0	0	1	0	16	1
Blackpool	1969–70	Second Division	9	0	0	0	1	0	10	0
Blackpool	1970–71	First Division	21	0	0	0	6	1	27	1
Blackpool	1971–71	Second Division	24	0	0	0	6	1	30	1
Blackpool	1972–73	Second Division	30	3	1	0	10	0	41	3
Blackpool	1973–74	Second Division	41	12	1	0	2	0	44	12
Blackpool	1974–75	Second Division	23	4	1	0	2	0	26	4
Blackpool	1975–76	Second Division	24	1	2	1	3	0	29	2
Blackpool	Total		193	21	5	1	31	2	229	24
Bury (loan)	1971–72	Fourth Division	6	1	0	0	0	0	6	1
Blackburn Rovers (loan)	1976–77	Second Division	3	1	2	0	0	0	5	1
Port Vale	1976–77	Third Division	1	0	0	0	0	0	1	0
Port Vale	1977–78	Third Division	3	0	0	0	3	2	6	2
Port Vale	Total		4	0	0	0	3	2	7	2
Portland Timbers (loan)	1977	NASL	7	2	—		—		7	2
Halifax Town	1977–78	Fourth Division	14	2	0	0	0	0	14	2
Career total			339	27	16	1	37	4	392	32

== Honours ==
Blackpool

- Football League Second Division second-place promotion: 1969–70
- Anglo-Italian Cup: 1971; runner-up: 1972
