= Dave Hatton =

English footballer (born 1943)

Personal information
- Full name: David Howcroft Hatton
- Date of birth: 30 October 1943 (age 82)
- Place of birth: Farnworth, England
- Positions: Midfielder; defender

Senior career*
Years	Team	Apps	(Gls)
1961–1969	Bolton Wanderers	231	(8)
1969–1976	Blackpool	251	(7)
1976–1979	Bury	97	(2)
Total		579	(17)

Managerial career
- 1977–1979: Bury (player-manager)
- * Club domestic league appearances and goals

David Howcroft Hatton (born 30 October 1943) is an English former professional footballer. He played as a midfielder and, later, a defender for three clubs in North West England.

== Career ==
=== Bolton ===
Hatton began his career at Bolton Wanderers in 1961. In eight years with the Trotters, for whom he was also captain, he made 259 league and cup appearances.

=== Blackpool ===
In 1969, Hatton joined Les Shannon's Blackpool for £40,000. He made his debut for the club on 6 September 1969, in a 3–2 victory over Swindon Town at Bloomfield Road. He went on to play in all of the remaining 35 league games of the 1969–70 campaign, at the end of which Blackpool were promoted to Division One as runners-up.

Hatton made another 36 league appearances in 1970–71 as Blackpool immediately returned to Division Two. In a league match against Chelsea at Bloomfield Road on 24 October 1970, Blackpool were leading 3–0 when the Londoners fought back to make the scoreline 3–3. Hatton then proceeded to score a last-minute own-goal to give the visitors the points.

In 1971–72, under new manager Bob Stokoe, Hatton appeared in all but two league games. He also scored his first goal for Blackpool — the only goal in a home victory over Sheffield Wednesday on 28 August 1971. He scored three more goals in the league — one in a 2–1 home defeat to Norwich City on 11 September; another one against Sheffield Wednesday, this time at Hillsborough, in a 2–1 victory on 8 January 1972; and one in a final-day 5–0 whitewash of Charlton Athletic at Bloomfield Road.

Hatton continued to be a regular at right-back during 1972–73, making 33 league appearances and scoring one goal — his third against Sheffield Wednesday in two seasons, this time in a 2–1 defeat at Bloomfield Road on 16 December 1972. He also scored in the FA Cup to help the Seasiders into the third round after two replays against AFC Bournemouth. Hatton scored in the second replay, which Blackpool won 2–1 after extra time. It was played at Villa Park.

During the 1973–74 season, under new manager Harry Potts, Hatton played at right-back, left-back, and one game as a forward. He made 31 league appearances, scoring one goal — in a 2–2 draw at Oxford United on 15 December 1973.

Hatton missed only one league game of the 1974–75 campaign. He scored one goal — a penalty at Bristol City on 23 November 1974, which gave Blackpool the points.

Hatton missed the first five games of the 1975–76 league season, which proved to be his last as a Blackpool player. He went on to make 34 subsequent appearances, however, the last of which occurred on 24 August 1976, in a final-day 3–0 defeat at Luton Town. He had made a total of 274 appearances for Blackpool in seven years, scoring eight goals.

=== Bury ===
Hatton joined Bury in the summer of 1976 after new Blackpool manager, Allan Brown, released him. In three years at Gigg Lane, he made 97 league appearances and scored two goals. For the final two years of his stint at the club, he was their player-manager. He was sacked after the Shakers narrowly avoided relegation to Division Four.

== Personal life ==
After retiring, Hatton owned a newsagents in St Annes. He sold it to former Blackpool player Dennis Wann, after Wann's retirement in the mid-1980s.
