= Peter Suddaby =

English footballer (born 1947)

Personal information
- Date of birth: 23 December 1947 (age 78)
- Place of birth: Stockport, England
- Position: Defender

Senior career*
Years	Team	Apps	(Gls)
–1969	Skelmersdale United		
1969–1970	Wycombe Wanderers	17	(3)
1970–1979	Blackpool	331	(10)
1979–1980	Brighton & Hove Albion	23	(2)
1981–1982	Wimbledon		
1982	Wycombe Wanderers	10	(1)
Total		387	(16)

Managerial career
- 1987–1988: Wycombe Wanderers
- * Club domestic league appearances and goals

Peter Suddaby (born 23 December 1947) is an English former professional footballer who played as a defender.

== Playing career ==
After spells as an amateur with Colwyn Bay, Skelmersdale United and Wycombe Wanderers, Suddaby began his professional career with Blackpool in 1970, and went on to make over 300 league appearances in a decade at the club. He made his debut for Blackpool on 23 January 1971, in a defeat at West Ham United in the fourth round of the FA Cup. He made a twelve League appearances in the 1970–71 season, at the conclusion of which Blackpool were relegated to Division Two after one season in the top flight.

In 1971–72, Suddaby appeared in all but the final league game of the season. He scored two goals – against Leyton Orient in a 4–1 victory at Bloomfield Road on 9 October 1971, and in a 5–0 whitewash of Watford, also at home, on New Year's Day.

During a single-goal defeat by Fulham on 30 November 1974, Suddaby damaged his back and had to have a disc removed to alleviate the problem. As a consequence, he missed almost the rest of the 1974–75 campaign.

Over the next three seasons, Suddaby made 102 league appearances. In 1975–76, he made 38 league appearances and scored four goals – two of which came in a 3–2 victory over Luton Town at Bloomfield Road on 4 October 1975.

In 1976–77, Suddaby was an ever-present in new manager Allan Brown's teams, helping the club to a fifth-placed Division Two finish.

The following season, 1977–78, Suddaby scored Blackpool's goal in the opening league game of the season, at home to Oldham Athletic. He went on to make 39 more appearances in the league campaign, at the end of which Blackpool were relegated to Division Three for the first time.

In 1978–79, under new manager Bob Stokoe, Suddaby appeared in 42 of Blackpool's 46 league games, scoring twice.

Suddaby's final season at Blackpool, 1979–80, saw him start in fifteen of the first sixteen league games, before he was sold to Brighton & Hove Albion in November 1979. His final game for Blackpool was in a single-goal home defeat to Swindon Town on 27 October 1979.

After 23 league games for Brighton, Suddaby had a short stint at Wimbledon, before returning to Wycombe Wanderers in 1982 for his final spell as a player.

== Later career ==
Suddaby was appointed manager of his final club, Wycombe Wanderers, in 1987, nearly five years after hanging up his boots. His managerial career was unsuccessful, however, and he left the club in January 1988 after five league wins from 25 matches.

Suddaby was the Academy Director at Tottenham Hotspur from September 1999 to April 2005. He became a mathematics teacher in September 2005 and retired in July 2018.
