= Alan Suddick =

English footballer

Personal information
- Date of birth: 2 May 1944
- Place of birth: Chester-le-Street, England
- Date of death: 15 March 2009 (aged 64)
- Place of death: Manchester, England
- Position: Midfielder

Senior career*
Years	Team	Apps	(Gls)
1961–1966	Newcastle United	144	(41)
1966–1976	Blackpool	310	(65)
1976–1977	Stoke City	9	(1)
1977–1978	→ Southport (loan)	6	(0)
1977–1978	Bury	34	(2)
1978–1979	Barrow	38	(3)
1979–19??	Lancaster City		
Total		541	(112)

International career
196?	England U23	2	(1)

Managerial career
- Barrow
- * Club domestic league appearances and goals

Alan Suddick (2 May 1944 – 15 March 2009) was an English professional footballer who played at inside-right for Blackpool, Bury, Newcastle United, Southport and Stoke City. A talented player, he was a dead ball specialist, with a unique ability to bend the ball, and was known in particular for his "banana" free-kicks; he would often crouch down before taking set pieces, so that the keeper could not see him, thus making his strikes more difficult to read.

== Club career ==
=== Newcastle United ===
Born in Chester-le-Street, County Durham, at the age of 17 years and 158 days, Suddick became Newcastle United's then-youngest-ever player. He was part of the Newcastle team that were Second Division champions and won promotion to the First Division in 1964–65. In his time at Newcastle, he played 152 games and scored 43 goals.

On 22 October 1966, Blackpool beat Newcastle 6–0 at Bloomfield Road. Suddick was in the Magpies' team that day, and so impressed were the home side with his commitment that, two months later, they paid a then-club-record £63,000 for his services.

=== Blackpool ===
Suddick made his Blackpool debut on 26 December 1966, in a 4–1 home defeat by West Ham United, and was virtually ever-present from that point on, striking up a partnership with Tommy Hutchison on the left or deep in midfield. Five days after his debut Suddick scored his first goal for the club in a 5–1 win at Southampton. In 1968–69, he was Blackpool's top scorer with twelve goals, missing just one game all season. He was part of the Blackpool team that won promotion to the First Division in 1969–70, and played in every league and cup match. He also played a big part in the Seasiders' FA Cup third round replay victory over Arsenal at Bloomfield Road on 15 January 1970, when Blackpool, 2–0 down at half-time, came back to win 3–2 with Suddick scoring the first goal.

He missed the majority of the 1970–71 season with a leg injury. In the 1971 Anglo-Italian Cup, Suddick scored what he considered to be the best goal he ever scored, in a 3–3 draw with Verona at Bloomfield Road on 26 May. In the final against Bologna in Rome on 12 June, he took the opposition apart in a 2–1 extra-time victory. On 27 October 1971, Charlton Athletic tried to sign Suddick, but the deal was turned down, with Blackpool manager Bob Stokoe refusing to even comment on it. At the end of the 1971–72 he won the club's Player of the Year award. In the close season he once again played in the Anglo-Italian Cup and scored one goal as Blackpool beat Lanerossi Vicenza 10–0 at home. Blackpool again reached the final, losing to Roma.

He helped the club reach the quarter-finals of the League Cup in 1972–73 and in an earlier round captained the side against AFC Bournemouth on 6 September 1972. He became the first player to score a penalty in all of the major competitions – the League, FA Cup and League Cup – when he scored from the spot in Blackpool's 2–1 victory over Bradford City A.F.C. at Valley Parade on 13 January. At the end of the season he again played in the Anglo-Italian Cup as Blackpool went undefeated, but were eliminated at the group stage by not scoring enough goals. Suddick scored his 100th League goal, a penalty, in Blackpool's 3–0 victory over Preston North End at Bloomfield Road on 23 March 1974. He missed much of the 1974–75 season with a re-occurrence of the leg injury that kept him out of action in 1970–71. Injuries would limit his appearances toward the end of his time at Blackpool and in October 1976 he was put on the transfer list. His last game came on 30 October, a 2–2 draw with Wolverhampton Wanderers.

He made a total of 371 appearances for the Seasiders, scoring 81 goals. His talent, however, was never truly realised, with his temper sometimes getting the better of him. Such was his popularity at Blackpool that he became known as "The King of Bloomfield Road" a title which the fans still affectionately call him. During his time playing for the club, Seasiders fans adapted two lines from the traditional English Christmas carol, "The First Nowell" to,

Suddick! Suddick! Suddick! Suddick!
Born is the King of Bloomfield Road!

Toward the end of his time at Blackpool, Suddick established an unofficial keepie uppie world record, completing three laps and 20 yards of the pitch, keeping the ball off the ground at Bloomfield Road in just under 20 minutes.

=== Later career ===
On 31 December 1976, he moved to Stoke City for a fee of £12,000. Injury restricted him to just nine matches for Stoke in the 1976–77 season, he did score once which came in a defeat away at West Bromwich Albion. In August 1977 he joined Fourth Division club Southport on loan, playing six games. Then in September he joined Third Division club Bury, before ending his league career at the end of the 1977–78 season. After spending a time coaching with Blackpool, in August 1978 he moved into non-league football with Barrow who were then in the Northern Premier League, where he played 38 games, scoring three goals. He also became the club's part-time player-manager, balancing a role as a hotel manager at the same time. On 2 November 1979 he joined Northern Premier League club Lancaster City teaming up at Giant Axe with former Blackpool teammate Keith Dyson.

== Blackpool F.C. Hall of Fame ==
Suddick was inducted into the Hall of Fame at Bloomfield Road, when it was officially opened by former Blackpool player Jimmy Armfield in April 2006. Organised by the Blackpool Supporters Association, Blackpool fans around the world voted on their all-time heroes. Five players from each decade are inducted; Suddick is in the 1970s.

== International career ==
Suddick played twice at Under-23 level for England, against Belgium when he scored one of the goals in a 6–1 victory and then against Yugoslavia when England won 4–2.

== Post-retirement ==
After he retired Suddick continued to live in Blackpool, close to Bloomfield Road, where he regularly attended matches.

He was inducted into the Hall of Fame at Bloomfield Road when it was officially opened by former Blackpool and England captain Jimmy Armfield in April 2006.

In December 2008 Suddick revealed that he would be undergoing stem cell replacement therapy in his battle against cancer, at Manchester Royal Infirmary in early 2009. On 18 February 2009 it was revealed that he was seriously ill in hospital. He underwent a tracheotomy on 27 February; however, his condition deteriorated and three weeks later both his legs were amputated below the knees after he contracted an infection and developed gangrene. His condition worsened again during 14 March and he died in his sleep the following day.

== Career statistics ==
Appearances and goals by club, season and competition
Club	Season	League			FA Cup		League Cup		Other^{[A]}		Total	
Club	Season	Division	Apps	Goals	Apps	Goals	Apps	Goals	Apps	Goals	Apps	Goals
Newcastle United	1961–62	Second Division	14	3	0	0	0	0	0	0	14	3
Newcastle United	1962–63	Second Division	31	10	0	0	1	1	0	0	32	11
Newcastle United	1963–64	Second Division	31	7	1	0	2	0	0	0	34	7
Newcastle United	1964–65	Second Division	21	6	1	0	0	0	0	0	22	6
Newcastle United	1965–66	First Division	29	14	2	1	0	0	0	0	31	15
Newcastle United	1966–67	First Division	18	1	0	0	1	0	0	0	19	1
Newcastle United	Total		144	41	4	1	4	1	0	0	152	43
Blackpool	1966–67	First Division	19	4	1	0	0	0	0	0	20	4
Blackpool	1967–68	Second Division	23	9	2	0	0	0	0	0	25	9
Blackpool	1968–69	Second Division	41	12	1	0	5	2	0	0	47	14
Blackpool	1969–70	Second Division	42	10	3	1	3	2	0	0	48	13
Blackpool	1970–71	First Division	20	1	1	0	2	1	5	1	28	3
Blackpool	1971–72	Second Division	41	10	1	0	2	1	5	2	49	13
Blackpool	1972–73	Second Division	42	10	1	1	7	2	4	1	54	14
Blackpool	1973–74	Second Division	39	6	1	0	2	0	0	0	41	6
Blackpool	1974–75	Second Division	5	0	0	0	0	0	3	1	8	1
Blackpool	1975–76	Second Division	27	1	0	0	1	0	3	1	31	2
Blackpool	1976–77	Second Division	11	2	0	0	4	0	3	1	18	3
Blackpool	Total		310	65	11	2	26	8	23	7	370	82
Stoke City	1976–77	First Division	9	1	0	0	0	0	0	0	9	1
Southport (loan)	1977–78	Fourth Division	6	0	0	0	2	0	0	0	8	0
Bury	1977–78	Third Division	34	2	1	0	0	0	0	0	35	2
Career Total			503	109	16	3	32	9	23	7	522	128

A. The "Other" column constitutes appearances and goals in the Anglo-Italian Cup, Anglo-Scottish Cup, Texaco Cup and Watney Cup.

== Honours ==
Newcastle United

- Second Division champion: 1964–65

Blackpool

- Anglo-Italian Cup winner: 1971
