= Graham Rowe =

English footballer

Personal information
- Full name: Graham Edward Rowe
- Date of birth: 28 August 1945 (age 81)
- Place of birth: Southport, England
- Position: Defender

Senior career*
| Years | Team | Apps | (Gls) |
| 1963–1971 | Blackpool | 105 | (12) |
| 1970–1971 | → Tranmere Rovers (loan) | 7 | (0) |
| 1971–1972 | Bolton Wanderers | 6 | (0) |
| Total | | 118 | (12) |
- * Club domestic league appearances and goals

Graham Edward Rowe (born 28 August 1945 in Southport, Lancashire) is an English former professional footballer. He played as a defender.

Rowe began his career just up the Lancashire coast at Ron Suart's Blackpool in 1963. He made his debut on 1 February 1963, in a draw at Wolves. He went on to make a further ten league appearances in the 1963–64 season and scored one goal, in a 3–2 victory over Blackburn Rovers at Bloomfield Road on 30 March 1963.

In 1964–65, Rowe was a regular in the defence, making 23 league appearances and scoring four goals. The following season, 1965–66, saw him make limited appearances, just thirteen overall. The same applied for 1966–67.

In Stan Mortensen's first full season in the manager's hotseat, Rowe again only saw action for a quarter of the season. He did score his first goal in two season, however, in a 2–1 win at Norwich City on 20 April 1968.

Season 1968–69 saw Mortensen move Rowe into a forward position for part of the season. It seemed to work, as he finished third-top scorer behind Alan Suddick and Ronnie Brown with six goals. This included a hat-trick in a 6–0 whitewash of Bury at Bloomfield Road on 23 November 1968.

In 1969–70, Rowe made just six league appearances. He scored one goal in the League Cup, in a 3–1 second-round victory over Gillingham on 3 September 1969.

Rowe's final season at Blackpool, 1970–71, saw him make five league appearances, partly because he joined Tranmere Rovers on loan during the season. He scored in the League Cup again, this time in a 4–1 victory over Newport County on 9 September 1970.

His final appearance for Blackpool occurred on 13 April 1971, in a draw at Stoke City.

Rowe finished his career with Bolton Wanderers in 1972, making six appearances for the Trotters.
