= Stuart Parker (footballer, born 1954) =

English footballer, manager, and club chairman

Personal information
- Full name: Stuart Parker
- Date of birth: 16 February 1954 (age 72)
- Place of birth: Preston, England
- Height: 6 ft 1 in (1.85 m)

Team information
- Current team: A.F.C. Blackpool (chairman)

Senior career*
Years	Team	Apps	(Gls)
1972–1975	Blackpool	16	(2)
1975–1977	Southend United	64	(23)
1977–1978	Chesterfield	34	(8)
1978–1979	Sparta Rotterdam	7	(1)
1979–1980	Blackburn Rovers	9	(1)
1980–1981	Tsuen Wan		
1981–1982	Racing Mechelen		
1982–1983	Bury	34	(9)
1983	Chester City	9	(5)
1983–1984	Drogheda United	3	(1)
1984	Stockport County	1	(0)
1984	Witton Albion		
1984	Irlam Town		
1984–1985	Runcorn	29	(3)
1985–1986	Barrow	15	(0)
1985–1986	South Liverpool	48	(1)
1986–1988	Northwich Victoria	58	(5)
1988–1989	Hyde United	5	(2)

Managerial career
- 2000–2005: Blackpool Mechanics
- 2005–2006: Squires Gate
- 2007–2017: A.F.C. Blackpool
- * Club domestic league appearances and goals

Stuart Parker (born 16 February 1954) is an English former professional footballer and a current English non-league football manager. He is currently chairman of A.F.C. Blackpool.

== Playing career ==
Parker began his career with Blackpool in 1972, making his debut under Bob Stokoe as a substitute in a 1–1 draw with Orient at Bloomfield Road on 16 September. He made two more appearances, both starts, during the remainder of the 1972–73 season.

He sat out the entirety of the domestic season of 1973–74, but appeared for the club in the "Caligaris" International (under-21) Tournament in northern Italy during the summer. He scored two goals in the final, against Napoli, as Blackpool became the first English club to win the tournament.

Parker made thirteen league appearances (eight starts, five substitute) in 1974–75. He scored his first goal for the club on 24 September, in a 4–0 home victory over Cardiff City. He scored his only other goal for the Tangerines in the very next game, four days later, a 3–1 win at Bristol Rovers. His final appearance for the club occurred in a 4–0 defeat at Manchester United in the final game of the season, on 26 April.

Parker signed for Drogheda United in January 1984 and on his debut won the only trophy in his career.

== Managing career ==
Parker started his managerial career as Assistant Manager at the top Blackpool Sunday league side Mammas FC who won back to back Lancashire Sunday Trophy titles in the mid nineties before he became manager of Blackpool Mechanics in 2000. In 2005 he was appointed manager of Squires Gate, leaving the following year. He returned to Blackpool Mechanics as manager in 2007, with the club being renamed AFC Blackpool the following year. He remained manager until the end of the 2016–17, when he became club chairman.

== Honours ==
=== As a player ===
Drogheda United

- League of Ireland Cup: 1983–84

=== As a manager ===
A.F.C. Blackpool

- North West Counties Football League First Division: 2010–11
