= Peter Hardcastle (footballer) =

English footballer

Personal information
- Full name: Peter David Hardcastle
- Date of birth: 27 January 1949 (age 77)
- Place of birth: Leeds, England
- Position: Full back

Youth career
- Skelmersdale United

Senior career*
Years	Team	Apps	(Gls)
1971–1973	Blackpool	36	(0)
1973–1976	Plymouth Argyle	14	(1)
1976–1978	Bradford City	62	(1)
Total		112	(2)

International career
1971	England amateur	1	(0)
- * Club domestic league appearances and goals

Peter David Hardcastle (born 27 January 1949) was an English professional footballer who played as a full back. Active for three clubs between 1971 and 1978, Hardcastle made over 100 appearances in the Football League.

== Career ==
Hardcastle was born in Leeds, and began his career as an amateur with Skelmersdale United. He represented the England amateur team that attempted to qualify for the 1972 Summer Olympics in March 1971. Hardcastle turned professional that same summer with Blackpool, making 36 appearances in the Football League over the next three seasons. During the 1971–72 campaign, which was Bob Stokoe's first full season in charge of the Seasiders, Hardcastle made sixteen appearances. His debut came on 4 December, when Blackpool played host to Preston North End at Bloomfield Road in the West Lancashire derby. The following season, he made nineteen League appearances, as well as helping the club to the fifth round of the League Cup. He made one appearance in 1973–74. It was as a substitute in a 3–2 defeat at Leyton Orient on 15 September, which proved to be his final appearance for the Tangerines, who were by then under the guidance of Harry Potts.

Hardcastle then signed for Plymouth Argyle, making a further 14 League appearances over the next two and a half seasons. Hardcastle's final club was Bradford City, where he spent two further seasons, and made a further 62 appearances in the League.
