= John Evanson =

English footballer

Personal information
- Date of birth: 10 May 1947 (age 79)
- Place of birth: Newcastle-under-Lyme, England
- Position: Midfielder

Senior career*
Years	Team	Apps	(Gls)
1966–1974	Oxford United	154	(10)
1974–1976	Blackpool	67	(0)
1976	Miami Toros	16	(1)
1976–1979	Fulham	95	(5)
1979–1981	A.F.C. Bournemouth	53	(2)
- Poole Town
Total		375	(18)
- * Club domestic league appearances and goals

John Evanson (born 10 May 1947) is an English former professional footballer who played for Oxford United, Blackpool, Miami Toros, Fulham, A.F.C. Bournemouth and Poole Town. During his spell at Oxford, he played 154 league games.

== Blackpool ==
Evanson made his debut for Harry Potts' Blackpool on 23 February 1974, in a 3–0 victory at Notts County. He made a further eight starts and two substitute appearances before the end of the 1973–74 campaign, at which point Blackpool lay fifth in the table.

He appeared in all but five League games of the following 1974–75 season as the Seasiders finished seventh.

The midfielder missed the majority of the first half of 1975–76, a start in a defeat to Bristol Rovers at Bloomfield Road on 25 October being the anomaly. From December onwards, he became a regular in the side, and made nineteen appearances by season's end. Harry Potts left his managerial seat at the seaside at the end of the season, and Evanson also departed. He made his final appearance for the club in the final game of the season, a 3–0 defeat at Luton Town on 24 April. He joined American club Miami Toros during the summer.
