= 1977–78 Port Vale F.C. season =

Port Vale F.C.
1977–78 season
- Chairman: Arthur McPherson
- Manager: Roy Sproson (until 31 October); Colin Harper (caretaker 31 October – 17 November); Bobby Smith (from 17 November)
- Stadium: Vale Park
- Football League Third Division: 21st (36 points)
- FA Cup: Second Round (eliminated by Walsall)
- League Cup: First Round (eliminated by Preston North End)
- Player of the Year: Ken Beamish
- Top goalscorer: League: Ken Beamish (13); All: Ken Beamish (16)
- Highest home attendance: 7,051 vs. Walsall, 19 December 1977
- Lowest home attendance: 3,220 vs. Hereford United, 22 March 1978
- Average home league attendance: 3,947
- Biggest win: 4–0 vs. Exeter City, 8 February 1978
- Biggest defeat: 0–3 (four games) and 1–4
Home colours

The 1977–78 season was Port Vale's 66th season of football in the Football League, and their eighth successive season (14th overall) in the Third Division. A poor start led to the dismissal of long-standing manager Roy Sproson in October, followed by a brief caretaker spell by Colin Harper, before the appointment of Bobby Smith in mid‑November — though the managerial change failed to arrest the club's slide toward relegation. Vale finished 21st with 36 points, ensuring relegation to the Fourth Division.

Ken Beamish stood out as the club's league top scorer with 13 goals, and finished the season as overall top scorer with 16 in all competitions. In cup competitions, Vale reached the Second Round of the FA Cup, where they were eliminated by Walsall, and bowed out in the First Round of the League Cup. Support on the terraces remained modest: the average attendance was 3,947, with the highest home attendance of 7,051 coming against Walsall on 19 December 1977, and the lowest being 3,220 against Hereford United on 22 March 1978. The club's largest win was a 4–0 victory over Exeter City on 8 February 1978, while several three-goal losses marked their heaviest reversals.

A season of turmoil on and off the pitch culminated in Val's relegation, despite late efforts under Bobby Smith and dependable scoring from Ken Beamish.

== Overview ==
=== Third Division ===
The pre-season saw manager Roy Sproson attempt to re-sign Sammy Morgan for £12,000, however, Morgan refused personal terms. Former Player of the Year David Harris also refused terms and demanded a transfer, so Terry Alcock re-joined on a month's trial to take his place. Three players arrived on free transfers: Jeff Hemmerman and Grahame McGifford from Hull City, and Bill Bentley from Blackpool. At a board meeting on 28 June, Sproson was severely criticized for his poor judgement of players and his seeming to place greater priority on his newsagent business than the club. Sproson did not attend the meeting but was informed the board would review his position after 15 games. The Football Association also hit the club with a £500 fine for their continuing problem with player indiscipline, despite Sproson's argument that no Vale players had been sent off in the last two years.

The season began poorly with a 3–1 defeat at home to Chesterfield. Harris returned to the first XI and Alcock thus departed. Goalkeeper John Connaughton picked up a knee injury, whilst a reporter from The Sentinel was allegedly told "I'll kill you" by a club official after he criticised the team in the paper. The reporter noted that "there is disenchantment in the air". The situation was calmed on 27 September, when Vale beat league leaders Colchester United 3–2 at Layer Road, reserve keeper Trevor Dance making a double penalty save. This was only a reprieve for Sproson however, as Vale would go the next 14 league games without a victory, and the Vale Park faithful turned against the team. This run was not too damaging however, as eleven of the games were drawn. Included in this was a club record streak of six home draws, lasting from 10 October to 27 December. On 1 October, Vale lost 2–1 at home to third-placed Bury after a "dreadful performance" and a missed penalty.

Sproson complained of Mick Cullerton's attitude and had to endure speculation of former Stoke City manager Tony Waddington taking his job. Sproson was sacked in October, and he rejected the offer of an executive position at the club. Colin Harper was made caretaker manager. The board tried and failed to attract Bill McGarry to the vacant managerial position, and so advertised the position with a significant salary increase to attract applicants. On 17 November, Bobby Smith was sacked as Bury manager, and the next day walked into the Vale job. He appointed Dennis Butler as his assistant, as Harper left the club. Sproson also returned to Vale with an offer 'to help in any capacity'. Victory finally came on New Year's Eve with a 3–0 win over Rotherham United. Soon after this, the 'Vale Lottery' was introduced, which proved to be a real money-spinner, and a five-a-side pitch was built for training.

In January, veteran defender Graham Hawkins was signed as a player-coach from Blackburn Rovers for £6,000. Forward Neville Chamberlain also joined the club as a professional, becoming the club's first black pro. John Froggatt also joined the club, signing from Colchester United for £10,000. Chairman Arthur McPherson celebrated this abandonment of frugality by declaring that "we are going places". Chris Harper slated the board for their decisions, calling them 'berserk'. Froggatt scored 15 seconds into his debut in a 4–0 win over Exeter City. However, this would be as good as it got for both Froggatt and Vale this season. Smith decided to row back on his initial attacking philosophy at the club as "we do not have the players to attack".

In February, Vale beat Fort Lauderdale Strikers in a friendly, but also started a five-game sequence without a win. Midfielder Ged Stenson arrived the next month from Everton for a 'bargain' £3,000, and right-back John Lumsdon joined on loan from Stoke City. Vale improved, and were unbeaten in six of their seven March games, with Chamberlain scoring the only goal of the game against Swindon Town on his debut on 11 March. On 28 March, they started a club-record streak of twelve home games without a win that would continue into the following season. Encouragement came from the youth side, who reached the Quarter Finals of the FA Youth Cup. With four games to go, Vale were point clear of the drop; however, by losing all of their remaining games, they doomed themselves to the Fourth Division. Their nerves had been shredded during a 3–0 defeat to Colchester United on the penultimate day. They took the lead at Plymouth Argyle on the final day, though they ended up losing the match by three goals to two.

They finished in 21st place with 36 points, three short of Rotherham United and safety. Their tally of 46 goals scored was the third-lowest in the division. They had failed to keep a clean sheet on their travels all season, achieving just one away win. Player of the Year Ken Beamish hit 16 goals, far outscoring his rivals.

=== Finances ===
On the financial side, a loss of £1,575 was made. The massive transfer outlay was paid for by huge donations of £51,428 from the Sportsmen's Association and the Development Fund. The lottery also brought in £600 a week. Gate receipts had brought in £78,965, a downturn in attendance being outweighed by an increase in ticket prices. Seven players were handed free transfers, five of which were: Mick Cullerton and Grahame McGifford (Northwich Victoria); Derek Brownbill (Cleveland Cobras); Alan Lamb (Dundee); and Kevin Kennerley (Stafford Rangers). Manager Bobby Smith also departed, having taken the vacant position at Swindon Town – Vale received £10,500 in compensation. Dennis Butler rejected the opportunity to leave with him and instead was appointed as Smith's replacement at Vale. Graham Hawkins became Butler's assistant.

=== Cup competitions ===
In the FA Cup, Smith's first game in charge was a goalless draw at Midland Counties League side Arnold. The replay in Burslem was won 5–2, the club's biggest win since January 1969. In the second round, Vale drew 1–1 with Walsall at Fellows Park before losing the replay 3–1 after Connaughton allowed a speculative shot from 25 yards (23 m) out to trickle through his hands. He later admitted, "I deserve to be strung up!".

In the League Cup, Vale beat Preston North End 2–1 in the home leg, though the fixture was unsettled by crowd violence. Preston won the return leg at Deepdale, and also the replay at Edgeley Park, Stockport.

== Results ==
=== Football League Third Division ===
==== League table ====
Pos	Team	Pld	W	D	L	GF	GA	GD	Pts	Promotion or relegation
19	Plymouth Argyle	46	11	17	18	61	68	−7	39	
20	Rotherham United	46	13	13	20	51	68	−17	39	
21	Port Vale (R)	46	8	20	18	46	67	−21	36	Relegation to the Fourth Division
22	Bradford City (R)	46	12	10	24	56	86	−30	34	Relegation to the Fourth Division
23	Hereford United (R)	46	9	14	23	34	60	−26	32	Relegation to the Fourth Division

Source: rsssf.com
(R) Relegated

==== Results by matchday ====
Round	1	2	3	4	5	6	7	8	9	10	11	12	13	14	15	16	17	18	19	20	21	22	23	24	25	26	27	28	29	30	31	32	33	34	35	36	37	38	39	40	41	42	43	44	45	46
Ground	H	A	H	A	H	H	A	A	H	A	H	A	H	A	H	A	A	H	A	H	A	H	H	A	H	A	A	H	A	A	H	H	A	H	A	H	A	H	A	A	H	H	A	H	H	A
Result	L	D	W	L	W	D	L	W	L	L	D	D	D	D	D	L	D	D	D	D	L	D	W	L	W	L	L	W	L	L	D	L	D	W	D	W	D	D	L	D	D	D	L	L	L	L
Position	20	19	17	20	12	15	20	17	21	23	22	22	21	21	21	22	21	21	21	20	21	21	18	18	17	18	20	18	19	19	19	19	19	19	18	18	19	19	19	19	19	19	19	20	20	21
Points	0	1	3	3	5	6	6	8	8	8	9	10	11	12	13	13	14	15	16	17	17	18	20	20	22	22	22	24	24	24	25	25	26	28	29	31	32	33	33	34	35	36	36	36	36	36

Source: Statto
A = Away; H = Home; W = Win; D = Draw; L = Loss

==== Matches ====
20 August 1977 1	Port Vale	1–3	Chesterfield	Burslem
	Hemmerman (pen.)	Report		Stadium: Vale Park; Attendance: 4,091

27 August 1977 2	Wrexham	1–1	Port Vale	Wrexham
15:00 BST	Griffiths 30' (pen.)	Report	Brownbill 17'	Stadium: Racecourse Ground; Attendance: 5,797; Referee: J.B. Worrall; Assistant referees: J.W. Lancaster, P.E. Wise

3 September 1977 3	Port Vale	2–1	Lincoln City	Burslem
	Hemmerman (pen.)	Report		Stadium: Vale Park; Attendance: 3,520

10 September 1977 4	Exeter City	4–1	Port Vale	Exeter
	Robertson (pen.) (pen.); Hodge; Holman	Report	Cullerton	Stadium: St James Park; Attendance: 5,026

12 September 1977 5	Port Vale	1–0	Bradford City	Burslem
	Lamb	Report		Stadium: Vale Park; Attendance: 3,814

17 September 1977 6	Port Vale	0–0	Sheffield Wednesday	Burslem
		Report		Stadium: Vale Park; Attendance: 5,136

24 September 1977 7	Walsall	2–0	Port Vale	Walsall
		Report		Stadium: Fellows Park; Attendance: 4,897

27 September 1977 8	Colchester United	2–3	Port Vale	Colchester
	Gough 17'; Garwood 90'	Report	Beech 10'; Beamish 55', 85'	Stadium: Layer Road; Attendance: 4,820; Referee: M Taylor

1 October 1977 9	Port Vale	1–2	Bury	Burslem
	Cullerton	Report		Stadium: Vale Park; Attendance: 3,672

8 October 1977 10	Shrewsbury Town	3–0	Port Vale	Shrewsbury
		Report		Stadium: Gay Meadow; Attendance: 3,553

10 October 1977 11	Port Vale	2–2	Gillingham	Burslem
	Bailey; Brownbill	Report		Stadium: Vale Park; Attendance: 3,418

15 October 1977 12	Swindon Town	1–1	Port Vale	Swindon
	Aizlewood 37'	Report	Sutcliffe 31'	Stadium: County Ground; Attendance: 6,327; Referee: D. Nippard

22 October 1977 13	Port Vale	0–0	Peterborough United	Burslem
		Report		Stadium: Vale Park; Attendance: 3,502; Referee: K. Walmsley

29 October 1977 14	Hereford United	1–1	Port Vale	Hereford
	Carter 7'	Report	Sutcliffe 33'	Stadium: Edgar Street; Attendance: 5,393

5 November 1977 15	Port Vale	0–0	Preston North End	Burslem
		Report		Stadium: Vale Park; Attendance: 4,208

12 November 1977 16	Chester	2–1	Port Vale	Chester
	Ian Edwards; Jeffries	Report	Brownbill	Stadium: Sealand Road; Attendance: 3,321

15 November 1977 17	Portsmouth	1–1	Port Vale	Portsmouth
	Kemp	Report	Hemmerman	Stadium: Fratton Park; Attendance: 7,071

19 November 1977 18	Port Vale	1–1	Tranmere Rovers	Burslem
	Hemmerman (pen.)	Report		Stadium: Vale Park; Attendance: 3,576

3 December 1977 19	Carlisle United	1–1	Port Vale	Carlisle
		Report	Bailey (pen.)	Stadium: Brunton Park; Attendance: 4,323

9 December 1977 20	Port Vale	3–3	Plymouth Argyle	Burslem
	Beamish 7'; Harris 29'; Lamb 50'	Report	Austin 38', 87'; Horswill 63'	Stadium: Vale Park; Attendance: 3,650; Referee: J. Bray

26 December 1977 21	Cambridge United	2–0	Port Vale	Cambridge
		Report		Stadium: Abbey Stadium; Attendance: 6,124

27 December 1977 22	Port Vale	1–1	Oxford United	Burslem
	Harris	Report	Stott	Stadium: Vale Park; Attendance: 3,997

31 December 1977 23	Port Vale	3–0	Rotherham United	Burslem
	Beamish; Sutcliffe	Report		Stadium: Vale Park; Attendance: 3,861

2 January 1978 24	Preston North End	2–0	Port Vale	Preston, Lancashire
		Report		Stadium: Deepdale; Attendance: 10,940

7 January 1978 25	Port Vale	2–0	Portsmouth	Burslem
	Beamish	Report		Stadium: Vale Park; Attendance: 3,481

14 January 1978 26	Chesterfield	2–0	Port Vale	Chesterfield, Derbyshire
		Report		Stadium: Saltergate; Attendance: 4,619

28 January 1978 27	Lincoln City	3–0	Port Vale	Lincoln
		Report		Stadium: Sincil Bank; Attendance: 3,205

8 February 1978 28	Port Vale	4–0	Exeter City	Burslem
	Froggatt; Sutcliffe; Beamish (pen.)	Report		Stadium: Vale Park; Attendance: 3,333

11 February 1978 29	Sheffield Wednesday	3–1	Port Vale	Owlerton
	Leman; Mullen; Tynan	Report	Griffiths (pen.)	Stadium: Hillsborough Stadium; Attendance: 9,659

25 February 1978 30	Bury	3–0	Port Vale	Bury, Greater Manchester
		Report		Stadium: Gigg Lane; Attendance: 4,475

28 February 1978 31	Port Vale	2–2	Walsall	Burslem
	Beamish; Lamb	Report		Stadium: Vale Park; Attendance: 4,682

4 March 1978 32	Port Vale	1–2	Shrewsbury Town	Burslem
	Griffiths (pen.)	Report		Stadium: Vale Park; Attendance: 3,499

8 March 1978 33	Bradford City	1–1	Port Vale	Bradford
		Report	Bailey	Stadium: Valley Parade; Attendance: 6,205

11 March 1978 34	Port Vale	1–0	Swindon Town	Burslem
	Chamberlain 90+1'	Report		Stadium: Vale Park; Attendance: 3,723; Referee: M. Peck

17 March 1978 35	Peterborough United	1–1	Port Vale	Peterborough
	Hughes 22'	Report	Chamberlain 76'	Stadium: London Road Stadium; Attendance: 4,277; Referee: C. Downey

22 March 1978 36	Port Vale	1–0	Hereford United	Burslem
	Froggatt 10'	Report		Stadium: Vale Park; Attendance: 3,220

25 March 1978 37	Oxford United	1–1	Port Vale	Oxford
	Foley	Report	Beamish	Stadium: Manor Ground; Attendance: 4,120

28 March 1978 38	Port Vale	1–1	Cambridge United	Burslem
	Griffiths (pen.)	Report		Stadium: Vale Park; Attendance: 4,240

1 April 1978 39	Rotherham United	2–0	Port Vale	Rotherham
		Report		Stadium: Millmoor; Attendance: 3,707

4 April 1978 40	Gillingham	1–1	Port Vale	Gillingham, Kent
		Report	Beamish	Stadium: Priestfield Stadium; Attendance: 7,627

8 April 1978 41	Port Vale	0–0	Chester	Burslem
		Report		Stadium: Vale Park; Attendance: 3,615

11 April 1978 42	Port Vale	1–1	Wrexham	Burslem
19:30 BST	Hawkins 86'	Report	Lyons 18'	Stadium: Vale Park; Attendance: 6,912; Referee: W.B. Johnson; Assistant referees: G. Bailey, A. Dobson

14 April 1978 43	Tranmere Rovers	2–1	Port Vale	Prenton
		Report	Beamish	Stadium: Prenton Park; Attendance: 2,460

22 April 1978 44	Port Vale	0–1	Carlisle United	Burslem
		Report		Stadium: Vale Park; Attendance: 3,942

24 April 1978 45	Port Vale	0–3	Colchester United	Burslem
		Report	Allinson 37'; Foley 54', 60'	Stadium: Vale Park; Attendance: 3,684; Referee: T Morris

29 April 1978 46	Plymouth Argyle	3–2	Port Vale	Plymouth
	Johnson 28'; Binney 52', 68'	Report	Beamish; Froggatt	Stadium: Home Park; Attendance: 9,474; Referee: L. Burden

=== FA Cup ===
26 November 1977 R1	Arnold	0–0	Port Vale	Arnold, Nottinghamshire
		Report		Stadium: Gedling Road; Attendance: 3,600

28 November 1977 Replay	Port Vale	5–2	Arnold	Burslem
	Sutcliffe; Bailey; Beamish; Ridley	Report		Stadium: Vale Park; Attendance: 5,205

17 December 1977 R2	Walsall	1–1	Port Vale	Walsall
		Report	Beamish	Stadium: Fellows Park; Attendance: 5,978

19 December 1977 Replay	Port Vale	1–3	Walsall	Burslem
	Beamish	Report		Stadium: Vale Park; Attendance: 7,051

=== League Cup ===
13 August 1977 R1 1st Leg	Port Vale	2–1	Preston North End	Burslem
	Beech; Alcock	Report		Stadium: Vale Park; Attendance: 4,630

16 August 1977 R1 2nd Leg	Preston North End	2–1 (3–3 agg.)	Port Vale	Preston, Lancashire
		Report	Hemmerman (pen.)	Stadium: Deepdale; Attendance: 5,816

23 August 1977 Replay	Preston North End	2–1	Port Vale	Stockport
		Report	Alcock	Stadium: Edgeley Park; Attendance: 2,201

== Squad statistics ==
=== Appearances and goals ===
Key to positions: GK – Goalkeeper; DF – Defender; MF – Midfielder; FW – Forward

No.	Pos	Nat	Player	Total		Third Division		FA Cup		League Cup	
No.	Pos	Nat	Player	Apps	Goals	Apps	Goals	Apps	Goals	Apps	Goals
	GK	(England) ENG	John Connaughton	45	0	38	0	4	0	3	0
	GK	(England) ENG	Trevor Dance	8	0	8	0	0	0	0	0
	DF	(England) ENG	Bill Bentley	37	0	32	0	2	0	3	0
	DF	(England) ENG	Russell Bromage	6	0	6	0	0	0	0	0
	DF	(England) ENG	Garry Dulson	22	0	20	0	2	0	0	0
	DF	(England) ENG	Neil Griffiths	40	4	33	4	4	0	3	0
	DF	(England) ENG	David Harris	45	2	41	2	4	0	0	0
	DF	(England) ENG	Graham Hawkins	16	1	16	1	0	0	0	0
	DF	(England) ENG	John Lumsdon	5	0	5	0	0	0	0	0
	DF	(England) ENG	Grahame McGifford	27	0	20	0	4	0	3	0
	DF	(England) ENG	Phil Sproson	2	0	2	0	0	0	0	0
	MF	(England) ENG	Terry Bailey	44	4	39	3	4	1	1	0
	MF	(England) ENG	Kenny Beech	30	2	26	1	1	0	3	1
	MF	(England) ENG	Kevin Kennerley	1	0	1	0	0	0	0	0
	MF	(Scotland) SCO	Alan Lamb	47	3	40	3	4	0	3	0
	MF	(England) ENG	John Lowey	0	0	0	0	0	0	0	0
	MF	(England) ENG	Mick Moore	13	0	13	0	0	0	0	0
	MF	(England) ENG	John Ridley	47	1	40	0	4	1	3	0
	MF	(England) ENG	Peter Sutcliffe	34	6	30	4	4	2	0	0
	FW	(England) ENG	Ken Beamish	49	16	42	13	4	3	3	0
	FW	(England) ENG	Derek Brownbill	28	3	21	3	4	0	3	0
	FW	(England) ENG	Neville Chamberlain	10	2	10	2	0	0	0	0
	FW	(Scotland) SCO	Mick Cullerton	17	2	17	2	0	0	0	0
	FW	(England) ENG	John Froggatt	12	3	12	3	0	0	0	0
	FW	(England) ENG	Jeff Hemmerman	20	6	15	5	2	0	3	1
Players who featured but departed the club during the season:
	DF	(England) ENG	Terry Alcock	6	2	3	0	0	0	3	2
	DF	(England) ENG	Brian Bithell	2	0	2	0	0	0	0	0
	DF	(England) ENG	John Brodie	0	0	0	0	0	0	0	0
	DF	(England) ENG	Colin Harper	4	0	4	0	0	0	0	0

=== Top scorers ===
Place	Position	Nation	Name	Third Division	FA Cup	League Cup	Total
1	FW	England	Ken Beamish	13	3	0	16
2	FW	England	Jeff Hemmerman	5	0	1	6
–	MF	England	Peter Sutcliffe	4	2	0	6
4	DF	England	Neil Griffiths	4	0	0	4
–	MF	England	Terry Bailey	3	1	0	4
6	MF	Scotland	Alan Lamb	3	0	0	3
–	FW	England	Derek Brownbill	3	0	0	3
–	FW	England	John Froggatt	3	0	0	3
9	FW	England	Neville Chamberlain	2	0	0	2
–	FW	Scotland	Mick Cullerton	2	0	0	2
–	MF	England	Kenny Beech	1	0	1	2
–	DF	England	David Harris	2	0	0	2
–	DF	England	Terry Alcock	0	0	2	2
14	DF	England	Graham Hawkins	1	0	0	1
–	MF	England	John Ridley	0	1	0	1
			TOTALS	46	7	4	57

== Transfers ==
=== Transfers in ===
Date from	Position	Nationality	Name	From	Fee	Ref.
June 1977	FW	ENG	Jeff Hemmerman	Hull City	Free transfer	
June 1977	DF	ENG	Grahame McGifford	Hull City	Free transfer	
July 1977	DF	ENG	Bill Bentley	Blackpool	Undisclosed	
July 1977	DF	ENG	Colin Harper	Ipswich Town	Free transfer	
January 1978	DF	ENG	Graham Hawkins	Blackburn Rovers	£6,000	
February 1978	FW	ENG	John Froggatt	Colchester United	£10,000	
March 1978	MF	ENG	Mick Moore	Wigan Athletic	£3,000	
March 1978	MF	ENG	Ged Stenson	Everton	£3,000	

=== Transfers out ===
Date from	Position	Nationality	Name	To	Fee	Ref.
1978	DF	ENG	Terry Alcock	Halifax Town	Free transfer	
January 1978	DF	ENG	Colin Harper	(Republic of Ireland) Waterford	Sacked	
April 1978	DF	ENG	John Brodie	Retired		
May 1978	FW	ENG	Derek Brownbill	(United States) Cleveland Cobras	Free transfer	
May 1978	FW	SCO	Mick Cullerton	Northwich Victoria	Free transfer	
May 1978	FW	ENG	Jeff Hemmerman	Portsmouth	Free transfer	
May 1978	MF	ENG	Kevin Kennerley	Stafford Rangers	Free transfer	
May 1978	MF	SCO	Alan Lamb	Dundee	Free transfer	
May 1978	DF	ENG	Grahame McGifford	Northwich Victoria	Free transfer	

=== Loans in ===
Date from	Position	Nationality	Name	From	Date to	Ref.
September 1977	DF	ENG	Brian Bithell	Stoke City	October 1977	
March 1978	DF	ENG	John Lumsdon	Stoke City	Summer 1978	

=== Loans out ===
Date from	Position	Nationality	Name	To	Date to	Ref.
February 1978	MF	ENG	Kevin Kennerley	Swansea City	February 1978	
