= Peter Hardcastle =

Peter Hardcastle is the name of:

- Peter Hardcastle (footballer) (born 1949), English professional footballer active in the 1970s
- Peter Hardcastle (rower) (born 1978), Australian three time Olympic rower.
