= Colin Harper (footballer) =

English footballer and manager

Personal information
- Full name: Colin George Harper
- Date of birth: 25 July 1946
- Place of birth: Ipswich, England
- Date of death: 29 March 2018 (aged 71)
- Place of death: Ipswich, England
- Height: 5 ft 9 in (1.75 m)
- Position: Left-back

Youth career
- 1964–1966: Ipswich Town

Senior career*
Years	Team	Apps	(Gls)
1966–1977	Ipswich Town	148	(5)
1976	→ Grimsby Town (loan)	3	(0)
1977	→ Cambridge United (loan)	15	(0)
1977–1978	Port Vale	4	(0)
1978	Waterford		
1978–1980	Sudbury Town		
1980–1981	Chelmsford City		
Total		170	(5)

Managerial career
- 1977: Port Vale (caretaker)
- 1978: Waterford
- 1978–1980: Sudbury Town
- 1980–1981: Chelmsford City
- * Club domestic league appearances and goals

Colin Harper (25 July 1946 – 29 March 2018) was an English professional footballer and football manager. He played as a left-back and made 198 league and cup appearances in a 12-year career in the Football League.

He spent 1966 to 1977 at Ipswich Town, helping the club to win the Second Division title in 1967–68 and then to go on to compete in Europe under Bobby Robson. In 1976–77, he played on loan at Grimsby Town and Cambridge United, helping Ron Atkinson's Cambridge to the Fourth Division title. He became player-manager for brief spells at Port Vale, Waterford (Ireland), Sudbury Town and Chelmsford City, before entering the building trade. He was inducted into the Ipswich Town F.C. Hall of Fame in 2016.

== Playing career ==
=== Ipswich Town ===
Harper started his career at Ipswich Town, who were struggling in the Second Division in 1965–66. He made his first-team debut on 19 February, in a 3–0 defeat at Plymouth Argyle. He turned professional under manager Bill McGarry, and helped the "Blues" to rise to fifth in 1966–67, before finishing top of the division in 1967–68. They retained their First Division status in 1968–69, after Bobby Robson was appointed as manager. Ipswich hovered above the relegation places in 1969–70 and 1970–71, before rising to 13th in 1971–72. He scored his first senior goal on 9 October 1971, in a 1–1 draw with Nottingham Forest at Portman Road. He was sent off for the first-time in his career on 15 April 1972, during a 0–0 draw with Sheffield United. Three days later he scored the second goal of his career, his header helping to deny Manchester City the title as it proved to be the winning goal in a 2–1 victory on the penultimate day of the season.

Town finished fourth in 1972–73 and 1973–74. However, Harper picked up a knee injury in 1973 that would plague the rest of his career. Their fourth-place finishes entitled them to compete in the UEFA Cup. Harper competed in Europe under Sir Bobby Robson and was part of the team which beat Real Madrid in the 1973 UEFA Cup. Still, Ipswich Town lost 4–3 on penalties against Lokomotiv Leipzig in the UEFA Quarter-final 2nd leg away at Bruno Plache Stadion with a high attendance of 57,000. They posted a third-place finish in 1974–75 and were just two points behind champions Derby County. Harper was granted a testimonial match in 1975. Ipswich dropped to sixth in 1975–76, before rising again to third-place in 1976–77, five points behind champions Liverpool. Harper had two loan spells in 1976–77, playing three Third Division games for relegated Grimsby Town and 15 games under Ron Atkinson on loan at Fourth Division champions Cambridge United.

=== Port Vale ===
Harper joined Third Division club Port Vale as player-coach in July 1977, with manager Roy Sproson appointing him to replace Roy Chapman. He made his debut in a 1–1 draw at Wrexham on 27 August, but was to only make a further three appearances for the "Valiants" in 1977–78. He was made acting manager on 18 October 1977, and insisted that there was to be no smiling during training as it was a serious matter. His reign at Vale Park only lasted a month as new manager Bobby Smith brought in his own staff, including assistant Dennis Butler, and Harper's contract was cancelled by the club in January 1978.

== Management career ==
After leaving Port Vale, he was appointed player-manager of Waterford. He led the "Blues" to the FAI Cup semi-finals and fifth in the League of Ireland. He signed with Sudbury Town in September 1978. He gave up playing three months later due to arthritis in his knee, though he stayed on at the club as manager. He then moved on to Chelmsford City, and led the club to an 18th-place finish in the Southern League in 1980–81.

== Later life ==
Harper became a builder after leaving the game. In May 2002, it was reported by the Ipswich Star that he had £7,000 worth of tools stolen from his van in Ipswich. He continued to follow Ipswich Town until his death from illness on 29 March 2018. An inquest revealed that he died from an asbestos-related disease, having been exposed to asbestos whilst working as an apprentice joiner and carpenter before he took up his football career.

== Career statistics ==
=== Playing statistics ===
Appearances and goals by club, season and competition
Club	Season	League			FA Cup		League Cup		Total	
Club	Season	Division	Apps	Goals	Apps	Goals	Apps	Goals	Apps	Goals
Ipswich Town	1965–66	Second Division	6	0	0	0	0	0	6	0
Ipswich Town	1966–67	Second Division	4	0	0	0	0	0	4	0
Ipswich Town	1967–68	Second Division	2	0	0	0	0	0	2	0
Ipswich Town	1968–69	First Division	4	0	0	0	0	0	4	0
Ipswich Town	1969–70	First Division	18	0	1	0	1	0	20	0
Ipswich Town	1970–71	First Division	13	0	0	0	0	0	13	0
Ipswich Town	1971–72	First Division	42	2	2	0	1	0	45	2
Ipswich Town	1972–73	First Division	35	1	2	1	10	0	47	2
Ipswich Town	1973–74	First Division	14	2	0	0	6	0	20	2
Ipswich Town	1974–75	First Division	10	0	0	0	5	0	15	0
Ipswich Town	Total		148	5	5	1	23	0	176	6
Grimsby Town (loan)	1976–77	Third Division	3	0	0	0	0	0	3	0
Cambridge United (loan)	1976–77	Fourth Division	15	0	0	0	0	0	15	0
Port Vale	1977–78	Third Division	4	0	0	0	0	0	4	0
Career total			170	5	5	1	23	0	198	6

=== Managerial statistics ===
Managerial record by team and tenure
Team	From	To	Record				
Team	From	To	P	W	D	L	Win %
Port Vale (caretaker)	31 October 1977	17 November 1977	3	0	2	1	0.0

== Honours ==
Ipswich Town

- Football League Second Division: 1967–68

Cambridge United

- Football League Fourth Division: 1976–77

Individual

- Ipswich Town Hall of Fame: Inducted 2016
