= Mickey Walsh =

Footballer (born 1954)

Personal information
- Full name: Michael Anthony Walsh
- Date of birth: 13 August 1954 (age 72)
- Place of birth: Chorley, England
- Position: Striker

Senior career*
Years	Team	Apps	(Gls)
–1973	Chorley		
1973–1978	Blackpool	180	(72)
1978	Everton	21	(1)
1978–1981	Queens Park Rangers	18	(3)
1980–1986	Porto	84	(42)
1986–1987	Salgueiros	29	(5)
1987–1988	Espinho	26	(4)
1988–1989	Rio Ave	2	(0)
Total		360	(127)

International career
1975–1984	Republic of Ireland	21	(3)
- * Club domestic league appearances and goals

Michael Anthony Walsh (born 13 August 1954) is a former professional footballer who works as a football agent. A striker, he spent his club career in England and Portugal. Born in England, he played for the Republic of Ireland national team at international level.

== Club career ==
Walsh began his professional career at Blackpool in 1973, making his debut in a goalless draw at Fulham on 12 September. He went on to score 72 league goals for the Seasiders in 180 games during his five years at the club. His strike in a 3–2 win against Sunderland at Bloomfield Road on 1 February 1975 earned him the "Goal of the Season" award on the BBC's Match of the Day. He signed for Everton in August 1978 for a fee of £375,000, a record fee for Blackpool at the time.

Walsh scored in both legs against Finn Harps in the 1978–79 UEFA Cup.

He was swapped for Queens Park Rangers striker Peter Eastoe in March 1979 and spent 18 months at QPR - who had a young Allen and Goddard to keep him out.

Then he was sold to Porto where he spent six years playing and appeared in their 2–1 defeat by Juventus in the 1984 European Cup Winners' Cup final, having scored at Shaktar Donetsk in the quarter-final.

== International career ==
Walsh qualified for the Republic of Ireland through his County Mayo-born father. He scored the only goal of the game as Ireland defeated the Soviet Union in a World Cup qualifier in Dublin in September 1984.

== Legacy ==
Walsh was inducted into the Hall of Fame at Bloomfield Road, when it was officially opened by former Blackpool player Jimmy Armfield in April 2006. Organised by the Blackpool Supporters Association, Blackpool fans around the world voted on their all-time heroes. Five players from each decade are inducted; Walsh is in the 1970s.

== Career statistics ==
=== Club ===
Appearances and goals by club, season and competition
Club	Season	League			National cup		League cup		Europe		Other		Total	
Club	Season	Division	Apps	Goals	Apps	Goals	Apps	Goals	Apps	Goals	Apps	Goals	Apps	Goals
Blackpool	1973–74	Second Division	21	3	0	0	0	0	0	0	0	0	21	3
Blackpool	1974–75	Second Division	37	12	1	0	1	1	0	0	3 (Note: Appearances in the Texaco Cup)	0	42	13
Blackpool	1975–76	Second Division	42	17	2	0	1	0	0	0	3 (Note: Appearances in the Anglo-Scottish Cup)	1	48	18
Blackpool	1976–77	Second Division	41	26	2	1	4	1	0	0	1	0	48	28
Blackpool	1977–78	Second Division	39	14	1	0	2	1	0	0	3	4	45	19
Blackpool	Total		180	72	6	1	8	3	0	0	10	5	204	81
Everton	1978–79	First Division	21	1	1	0	3	0	4 (Note: Appearances in the UEFA Cup)	2	0	0	29	3
Queen's Park Rangers	1978–79	First Division	10	3	0	0	0	0	0	0	0	0	10	3
Queen's Park Rangers	1979–80	Second Division	7	0	1	0	1	0	0	0	0	0	9	0
Queen's Park Rangers	1980–81	Second Division	1	0	0	0	0	0	0	0	0	0	1	0
Queen's Park Rangers	Total		18	3	1	0	1	0	0	0	0	0	20	3
Porto	1980–81	Primeira Liga	19	14	6	2	0	0	0	0	0	0	25	16
Porto	1981–82	Primeira Liga	8	0	3	2	0	0	4 (Note: Appearances in the UEFA Cup Winner's Cup)	2	2 (Note: Appearances in the Supertaça Cândido de Oliveira)	0	17	4
Porto	1982–83	Primeira Liga	25	15	4	2	0	0	3	2	0	0	32	19
Porto	1983–84	Primeira Liga	16	9	4	3	0	0	7	1	0	0	27	13
Porto	1984–85	Primeira Liga	8	1	1	0	0	0	2	0	1	0	12	1
Porto	1985–86	Primeira Liga	8	3	1	2	0	0	1 (Note: Appearance in the European Cup)	0	0	0	10	3
Porto	Total		84	42	19	9	0	0	17	5	3	0	123	56
Salgueiros	1986–87	Primeira Liga	29	5	0	0	0	0	0	0	0	0	29	5
Espinho	1987–88	Primeira Liga	26	4	0	0	0	0	0	0	0	0	26	4
Rio Ave	1988–89	Segunda Divisão	2	0	0	0	0	0	0	0	0	0	2	0
Career total			360	127	27	10	12	3	21	7	13	5	433	152

=== International ===
Appearances and goals by national team and year
National team	Year	Apps	Goals
Republic of Ireland	1976	3	1
Republic of Ireland	1977	1	0
Republic of Ireland	1978	1	0
Republic of Ireland	1979	3	0
Republic of Ireland	1981	2	0
Republic of Ireland	1982	3	0
Republic of Ireland	1983	3	1
Republic of Ireland	1984	5	1
Total		21	3

Scores and results list Republic of Ireland's goal tally first, score column indicates score after each Walsh goal.

List of international goals scored by Mickey Walsh
No.	Date	Venue	Cap	Opponent	Score	Result	Competition
1	24 March 1976	Dalymount Park, Dublin, Ireland	1	Norway	3*–0	3–0	Friendly
2	21 September 1983	Laugardalsvöllur, Reykjavík, Iceland	15	Iceland	3*–0	3–0	UEFA Euro 1984 qualification
3	12 September 1984	Lansdowne Road, Dublin, Ireland	19	Soviet Union	1*–0	1–0	1986 FIFA World Cup qualification

== Honours ==
Porto

- Primeira Liga: 1984–85, 1985–86
- Taça de Portugal: 1983–84
- Supertaça Cândido de Oliveira: 1981, 1983, 1984
- UEFA Cup Winners' Cup runner-up: 1983–84

== See also ==
- List of Republic of Ireland international footballers born outside the Republic of Ireland
