= John Lumsdon =

English footballer

Personal information
- Full name: John David Lumsdon
- Date of birth: 20 July 1956 (age 70)
- Place of birth: Newcastle-under-Lyme, England
- Height: 5 ft 6 in (1.68 m)
- Position: Right-back

Senior career*
Years	Team	Apps	(Gls)
1975–1978	Stoke City	28	(0)
1978	→ Port Vale (loan)	5	(0)
- Telford United
Total		33+	(0+)
- * Club domestic league appearances and goals

John David Lumsdon (born 20 July 1956) is an English former footballer who played at right-back for Stoke City, Port Vale, and Telford United in the 1970s.

== Career ==
Lumsdon started his career with Stoke City, playing ten First Division games in the 1975–76 season. He made 13 appearances in the 1976–77 season as Tony Waddington's "Potters" suffered relegation. He played five Second Division games in the 1977–78 season. He was loaned to Potteries derby rivals Port Vale in March 1978. He played five Third Division games for Bobby Smith's "Valiants" before returning to Victoria Ground at the end of the season. As of March 2017, he is the last player to have joined Port Vale on loan from Stoke City. He later moved on to Southern League side Telford United.

== Career statistics ==
Appearances and goals by club, season and competition
Club	Season	League			FA Cup		League Cup		Total	
Club	Season	Division	Apps	Goals	Apps	Goals	Apps	Goals	Apps	Goals
Stoke City	1975–76	First Division	10	0	0	0	0	0	10	0
Stoke City	1976–77	First Division	13	0	0	0	0	0	13	0
Stoke City	1977–78	Second Division	5	0	0	0	0	0	5	0
Stoke City	Total		28	0	0	0	0	0	28	0
Port Vale (loan)	1977–78	Third Division	5	0	0	0	0	0	5	0
Career total			33	0	0	0	0	0	33	0
