= Ronnie Brown (footballer) =

English footballer and manager

Personal information
- Date of birth: 26 December 1944 (age 81)
- Place of birth: Sunderland, England
- Position: Winger

Youth career
- Whitley Bay

Senior career*
Years	Team	Apps	(Gls)
1965–1970	Blackpool	61	(13)
1970–1972	Plymouth Argyle	36	(3)
1972–1975	Bradford City	97	(11)
- * Club domestic league appearances and goals

Ronald E. Brown (born 26 December 1944) is an English retired footballer who played for Blackpool, Plymouth Argyle and Bradford City. He was born in Sunderland.
