= Ged Stenson =

English footballer

Personal information
- Full name: Gerard Patrick Stenson
- Date of birth: 30 December 1959 (age 66)
- Place of birth: Bootle, England
- Height: 5 ft 7 in (1.70 m)
- Position: Midfielder

Youth career
- Everton

Senior career*
| Years | Team | Apps | (Gls) |
| 1978–1979 | Port Vale | 12 | (0) |
- Morecambe
- Prescot Cables
- * Club domestic league appearances and goals

Gerard Patrick Stenson (born 30 December 1959) is an English former footballer who played as a midfielder for Port Vale, Morecambe, and Prescot Cables in the late 1970s.

== Career ==
Stenson played for Everton before joining Third Division side Port Vale in March 1978 for a £3,000 fee. The club were relegated that season under the stewardship of Bobby Smith. Stenon was instead handed his debut by new manager Dennis Butler came on 12 August, in a League Cup first round 3–0 defeat to Chester at Vale Park. Despite the scoreline, Stenson made a big impression and started the next eight matches. His performances waned, however, and after September, he was only ever a back-up player. He played 11 Fourth Division and two League Cup games in the 1978–79 season, and featured in just one league game in the 1979–80 campaign. After having his contract cancelled by new boss Alan Bloor by 'mutual agreement' in October 1979, he moved on to Morecambe (Northern Premier League) and then Prescot Cables.

== Career statistics ==
Appearances and goals by club, season and competition
| Club | Season | League | | | FA Cup | | League Cup | | Total | |
| Club | Season | Division | Apps | Goals | Apps | Goals | Apps | Goals | Apps | Goals |
|---|---|---|---|---|---|---|---|---|---|---|
| Port Vale | 1978–79 | Fourth Division | 11 | 0 | 0 | 0 | 2 | 0 | 13 | 0 |
| Port Vale | 1979–80 | Fourth Division | 1 | 0 | 0 | 0 | 0 | 0 | 1 | 0 |
| Port Vale | Total | | 12 | 0 | 0 | 0 | 2 | 0 | 14 | 0 |
