= Bobby Smith (footballer, born 1944) =

English footballer and manager

Personal information
- Full name: Robert William Smith
- Date of birth: 14 March 1944 (age 82)
- Place of birth: Prestbury, England
- Height: 5 ft 8 in (1.73 m)
- Position: Inside forward

Senior career*
Years	Team	Apps	(Gls)
1961–1965	Manchester United	0	(0)
1965–1967	Scunthorpe United	82	(12)
1967–1968	Grimsby Town	52	(1)
1968–1971	Brighton & Hove Albion	75	(2)
1971	Chester	2	(0)
1971–1973	Hartlepool United	69	(7)
1973	Bury	0	(0)
Total		280	(20)

International career
	England Schoolboys	6	(0)
1961	England Youth	5	(0)

Managerial career
- 1973–1977: Bury
- 1977–1978: Port Vale
- 1978–1980: Swindon Town
- 1985–1986: Newport County
- 1995: Swansea City (caretaker)
- * Club domestic league appearances and goals

Robert William Smith (born 14 March 1944) is an English former footballer and football manager. He was capped by England at Schoolboys and Youth level. He is the son of Conway Smith and grandson of Billy Smith, from whom he gets his middle name.

A reserve player for Manchester United, he moved on to Scunthorpe United in 1965, where he established himself in the first team. Moving on to Grimsby Town in 1967, he transferred to Brighton & Hove Albion the following year. In 1971, he signed with Hartlepool United via Chester, before he finished his playing career with Bury in 1973.

Appointing as Bury's manager in 1973, he led the club to promotion out of the Football League Fourth Division in 1973–74, before he was sacked in November 1977. Quickly installed as Port Vale manager, he moved on to Swindon Town the following year, having failed to prevent the club from suffering relegation. Despite promising league campaigns and cup runs, he was sacked in October 1980. Spending time as a coach at Blackpool, he returned to management in 1985 with Newport County, as the club were in financial meltdown; he departed the following year. Remaining in the game as a coach at Cardiff City, Hereford United, and Swansea City, he was appointed caretaker manager at Swansea in 1995. However, he resigned after less than three months in charge and took a role in the back-room staff at Sheffield Wednesday.

== Club career ==
Smith began his career with Manchester United, turning professional in April 1961. He made over 200 appearances for the United reserve team, but Matt Busby did not give him his First Division debut. Smith left Old Trafford in March 1965 to join Scunthorpe United. Under Fred Goodwin, the Iron finished the 1964–65 campaign in 18th place in the Third Division. They rose to fourth in 1965–66, still 12 points short of a promotion place, before they dropped to 18th in 1966–67.

Smith moved to Grimsby Town, for a fee of £8,000, but failed to prevent Don McEvoy's Mariners from slipping into the Fourth Division in 1967–68. Smith remained in the Third Division, signing with Freddie Goodwin's Brighton & Hove Albion in June 1968. The Seagulls finished 12th in 1968–69, before rising to fifth in 1969–70, only five points shy of the promotion places. Goodwin chided the Goldstone Ground supporters for barracking Smith in January 1970, writing in the matchday programme that "he has done nothing to warrant this behaviour". Brighton dropped down to 14th-place in 1970–71 under Pat Saward.

In June 1971, Smith signed with Ken Roberts' Chester on a free transfer. He moved to Hartlepool United – initially on loan – in October of that year. Both teams struggled at the foot of the Football League, with Len Ashurst's Pools finishing just above the re-election places in 1971–72 and 1972–73. In August 1973, he moved to Bury as a player-coach, but failed to appear in their league side.

== International career ==
Smith won six caps for England Schoolboys and played twice for the England youth-team in a 1–0 loss to the Netherlands in Utrecht on 9 March 1961, and a 2–0 defeat to West Germany in Flensburg three days later.

== Style of play ==
Smith was a tough-tackling midfielder with aggression but limited technical skill.

== Managerial and coaching career ==
=== Bury ===
Smith began his managerial career with Bury in November 1973, taking over from Allan Brown. At the age of 29, he was the youngest manager in the Football League. He had initial success, guiding Bury to promotion from the Fourth Division in the fourth automatic place at the end of the 1973–74 season. He stabilised the Gigg Lane club in the Third Division in 1974–75 with a 14th-place finish. They went on to finish 13th in 1975–76, before finishing five points off the promotion places in 1976–77. He was sacked by Bury on 16 November 1977 after a poor start to the season. The Shakers finished the 1977–78 campaign in 15th place under the stewardship of Bob Stokoe.

=== Port Vale ===
A day after leaving Bury, he was appointed as manager of Port Vale. He replaced club legend Roy Sproson. He was given a large war chest to spend after a successful lottery scheme was set up at Vale Park. He took over with the club in 21st place in the Third Division. His first game in charge was a 0–0 draw with Midland Counties League side Arnold in the first round of the FA Cup. In January, veteran defender Graham Hawkins was signed as a player-coach from Blackburn Rovers for £6,000. Forward Neville Chamberlain also joined the club as a professional, becoming the club's first black pro. John Froggatt also joined the club, signing from Colchester United for £10,000. Chairman Arthur McPherson celebrated this abandonment of frugality by declaring "we are going places". Local journalist Chris Harper slated the board for their decisions, calling them 'berserk'. Froggatt scored 15 seconds into his debut in a 4–0 win over Exeter City. However, this would be as good as it got for both Froggatt and Vale that season. In February, Vale beat Fort Lauderdale Strikers in a friendly, but also started a five-game sequence without a win. Ged Stenson arrived the next month from Everton for a 'bargain' £3,000, and John Lumsdon joined on loan from Stoke City. Vale improved and were unbeaten in six of their seven March games, with Chamberlain scoring on his debut. Yet on 28 March, they started a club-record streak of twelve home games without a win that would continue into the following season. Encouragement came from the youth team, who reached the Quarter finals of the FA Youth Cup. With four games to go, Vale were one point clear of the drop, However, by losing all of their remaining games the Valiants ended the 1977–78 season in 21st place and were relegated into the Fourth Division. Smith was appointed as manager of Swindon Town in May 1978, with the club having to pay a compensation fee of £10,500 to Port Vale. His assistant, Dennis Butler, stayed on at the club and was appointed as his successor.

=== Swindon Town ===
Despite still being a relatively young manager, Smith guided Swindon to a Third Division promotion challenge in his first season in charge - missing out by three points after losing the last two games of the season. His two signings, Alan Mayes and Andy Rowland, formed a deadly strike partnership, and were both selected on the PFA Team of the Year.

The following season Swindon beat Stoke City, Wimbledon and Arsenal to reach the League Cup semi-final. They lost out to Wolverhampton Wanderers when Wolves scored the winner five minutes from the end of the second leg. However, Town squandered a promising league position to finish the campaign in tenth place. During the campaign, his team recorded an 8–0 win over former club Bury.

Having spent large amounts of money, particularly on £150,000 left-back David Peach and £110,000 midfielder Glenn Cockerill, expectations were high at Swindon for the 1980–81 season. However, Smith was sacked in October 1980 after Swindon lost their first five games and were stuck in the relegation zone. They finished the campaign in 17th place under the stewardship of John Trollope.

=== Newport County ===
In 1981, he joined the coaching staff at Blackpool and in July 1982 moved to be a coach at Newport County. He was appointed manager of Newport in June 1985. He kept the club rooted to 18th in the Third Division in 1985–86, before a run of seven straight defeats saw the club hovering above the relegation places and ultimately cost him his job. His replacement John Relish managed to steer the club to safety.

=== Coaching ===
He coached Cardiff City between 1989 and July 1990 after being brought to the club by manager Frank Burrows. Later that year, he became assistant manager to Colin Addison at Hereford United. He joined the coaching staff at Swansea City in March 1991, and the following year, Burrows appointed him as his assistant. In October 1995, he became caretaker manager of Swansea after the departure of Burrows but resigned just 80 days later in December of the same year. With four more managerial changes (Kevin Cullis, Jan Mølby as player-manager and Jimmy Rimmer as caretaker manager on two occasions), the Swans finished 1995–96 in the Second Division relegation zone. In 1996, Smith was appointed to the coaching staff at Sheffield Wednesday by David Pleat, where he performed a variety of roles before leaving in the summer of 1999.

== Career statistics ==
=== Playing statistics ===
Appearances and goals by club, season and competition
Club	Season	League			FA Cup		Other^{[A]}		Total	
Club	Season	Division	Apps	Goals	Apps	Goals	Apps	Goals	Apps	Goals
Scunthorpe United	1964–65	Third Division	12	0	0	0	0	0	12	0
Scunthorpe United	1965–66	Third Division	45	7	3	1	1	0	49	8
Scunthorpe United	1966–67	Third Division	25	5	2	1	1	0	28	6
Scunthorpe United	Total		82	12	5	2	2	0	89	14
Grimsby Town	1966–67	Third Division	22	0	0	0	0	0	22	0
Grimsby Town	1967–68	Third Division	30	1	2	0	2	0	34	1
Grimsby Town	Total		52	1	2	0	2	0	56	1
Brighton & Hove Albion	1968–69	Third Division	30	1	3	0	0	0	33	1
Brighton & Hove Albion	1969–70	Third Division	23	1	0	0	3	0	26	1
Brighton & Hove Albion	1970–71	Third Division	22	0	3	0	1	0	26	0
Brighton & Hove Albion	Total		75	2	6	0	4	0	85	2
Chester	1971–72	Fourth Division	2	0	0	0	0	0	2	0
Hartlepool United	1971–72	Fourth Division	32	2	2	0	0	0	34	2
Hartlepool United	1972–73	Fourth Division	37	5	3	0	2	1	42	6
Hartlepool United	Total		69	7	5	0	2	1	76	8
Bury	1973–74	Fourth Division	0	0	0	0	1	0	1	0
Career total			280	22	18	2	11	1	309	25

A. The "Other" column constitutes appearances and goals in the League Cup, Football League Trophy, English Football League play-offs and Full Members Cup.

=== Managerial statistics ===
Managerial record by team and tenure
Team	From	To	Record				
Team	From	To	P	W	D	L	Win %
Bury	19 October 1973	17 November 1977	215	90	58	67	41.9
Port Vale	17 November 1977	17 May 1978	33	6	14	13	18.2
Swindon Town	17 May 1978	30 September 1980	132	63	25	44	47.7
Newport County	1 June 1985	1 March 1986	39	11	16	12	28.2
Swansea City (caretaker)	2 October 1995	28 December 1995	15	2	5	8	13.3
Total			434	172	118	144	39.6

== Honours ==
Bury

- Football League Fourth Division fourth-place promotion: 1973–74
