= 1971 Anglo-Italian Cup =

Association football tournament

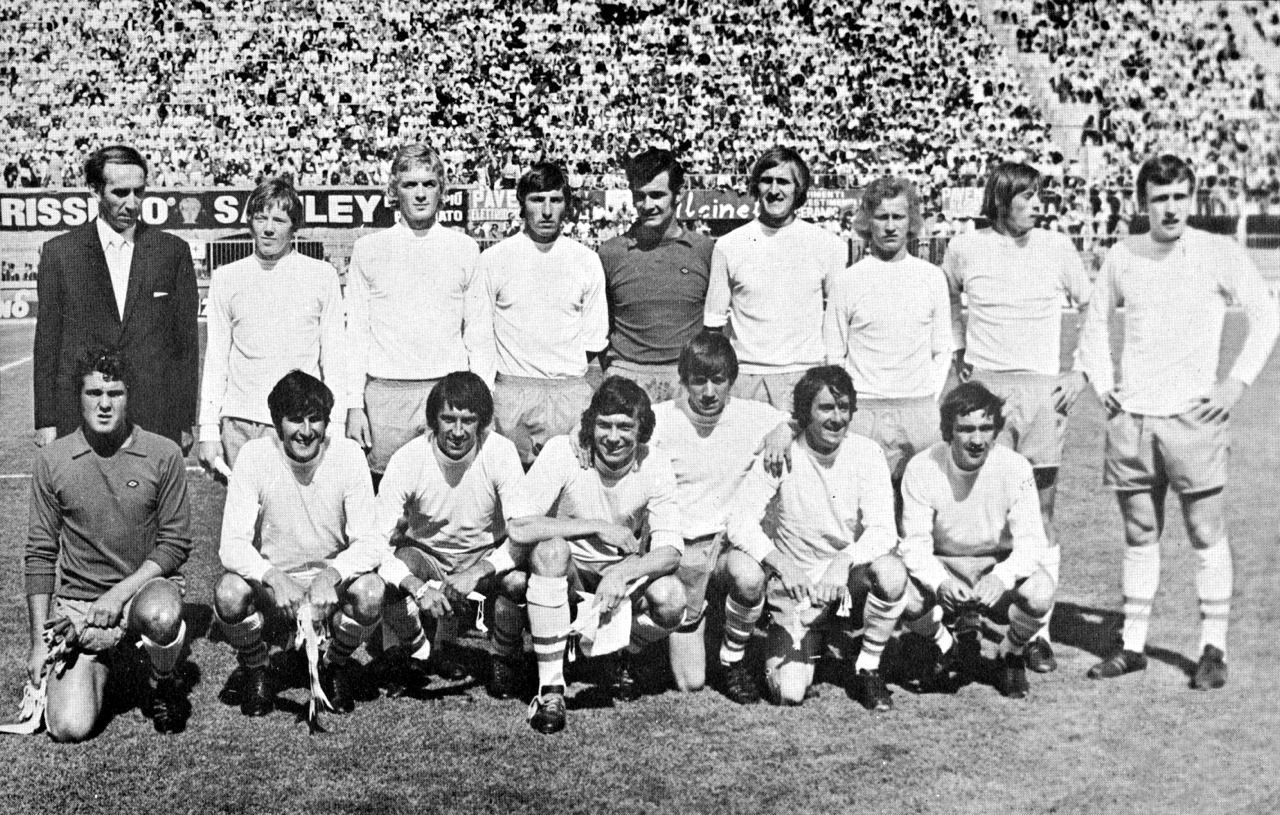
The first-team squad of Blackpool F.C. winners of final in Bologna, Italy.

The 1971 Anglo-Italian Cup was the second staging of the annual association football tournament. It featured twelve teams — six from England and six from Italy.

The competition started on 26 May 1971 and concluded on 12 June 1971 with Blackpool beating Bologna 2–1 in the final.

== Details ==
The twelve teams were divided into three groups of four teams — two from England and two from Italy. Each team plays the two foreign teams twice, home and away. The teams are then ranked against teams in their own country in a league, and the top-ranked teams from each country play off in a final for the trophy.

== Participating teams ==
=== England ===
- Blackpool
- Crystal Palace
- Huddersfield Town
- Stoke City
- Swindon Town
- West Brom

=== Italy ===
- Bologna
- Cagliari
- Inter Milan
- Roma
- Sampdoria
- Verona

== Group results ==
=== Group 1 ===
26 May 1971

| Huddersfield Town | 2 – 0 | Sampdoria |
|---|---|---|
| Ellam, Smith |

Attendance: 10,003
26 May 1971

| Swindon Town | 2 – 2 | Bologna |
|---|---|---|
| Noble Gough 60' | | Rizzo 24', Arini 82' |

The County Ground
29 May 1971

| Huddersfield Town | 2 – 3 | Bologna |
|---|---|---|
| Cherry Smith |

Attendance: 12,000
29 May 1971

| Swindon Town | 4 – 1 | Sampdoria |

1 June 1971

| Sampdoria | 2 – 3 | Huddersfield Town |

1 June 1971

| Bologna | 3 – 1 | Swindon Town |

4 June 1971

| Bologna | 1 – 0 | Huddersfield Town |

4 June 1971

| Sampdoria | 1 – 2 | Swindon Town |

=== Group 2 ===
26 May 1971

| Crystal Palace | 1 – 0 | Cagliari |
|---|---|---|
| Tambling | (ref) |

Selhurst Park
Attendance: 19,326
26 May 1971

| West Brom | 1 – 1 | Inter Milan |
|---|---|---|
| Wile 30' | | Gabriele Oriali 61' |

The Hawthorns
Attendance: 17,363
Referee: Antonio Sbardella
29 May 1971

| West Brom | 1 – 2 | Cagliari |
|---|---|---|
| Astle | | Mancin Domenghini |

The Hawthorns
29 May 1971

| Crystal Palace | 1 – 1 | Inter Milan |
|---|---|---|
| Birchenall 5' | (ref) | Boninsegna 73' |

Selhurst Park
Attendance: 25,152
Referee: Oralio Angonese
1 June 1971

| Inter Milan | 1 – 0 | West Brom |
|---|---|---|
| Bertini 52' | Report |

San Siro, Milan
1 June 1971

| Cagliari | 2 – 0 | Crystal Palace |
|---|---|---|
| Gigi Riva Gigi Riva | Report |

Stadio Comunale Sant'Elia
Attendance: 30,000
4 June 1971

| Inter Milan | 1 – 2 | Crystal Palace |
|---|---|---|
| Burgnich 48' | (ref) | Tambling 15' 55' |

San Siro
Attendance: 28,000
4 June 1971

| Cagliari | 1 – 0 | West Brom |

=== Group 3 ===
26 May 1971

| Blackpool | 3 – 3 | Verona |
|---|---|---|
| Burns, Suddick, Nicholson | | Clerici (2), Orazi |

Bloomfield Road
Attendance: 9,917
26 May 1971

| Stoke City | 2 – 2 | Roma |
|---|---|---|
| Greenhoff, Smith | | La Rosa, Vieri |

Victoria Ground
Attendance: 10,520
29 May 1971

| Blackpool | 1 – 3 | Roma |

Bloomfield Road
29 May 1971

| Stoke City | 2 – 0 | Verona |

Victoria Ground
Attendance: 10,500
1 June 1971

| Roma | 0 – 1 | Stoke City |

1 June 1971

| Verona | 1 – 4 | Blackpool |

4 June 1971

| Verona | 2 – 1 | Stoke City |

4 June 1971

| Roma | 1 – 2 | Blackpool |

== Final rankings ==
Total points are determined by points gained plus goals scored. (NB: two points for a win).

=== English rankings ===
| Team | Pts | Pld | W | D | L | GF | GA | GD |
|---|---|---|---|---|---|---|---|---|
| Blackpool | 15 | 4 | 2 | 1 | 1 | 10 | 8 | +2 |
| Swindon Town | 14 | 4 | 2 | 1 | 1 | 9 | 7 | +2 |
| Stoke City | 11 | 4 | 2 | 1 | 1 | 6 | 4 | +2 |
| Huddersfield Town | 11 | 4 | 2 | 0 | 2 | 7 | 6 | +1 |
| Crystal Palace | 9 | 4 | 2 | 1 | 1 | 4 | 4 | +0 |
| West Brom | 3 | 4 | 0 | 1 | 3 | 2 | 5 | -3 |

=== Italian rankings ===
| Team | Pts | Pld | W | D | L | GF | GA | GD |
|---|---|---|---|---|---|---|---|---|
| Bologna | 16 | 4 | 3 | 1 | 0 | 9 | 5 | +4 |
| Cagliari | 11 | 4 | 3 | 0 | 1 | 5 | 2 | +3 |
| Roma | 9 | 4 | 1 | 1 | 2 | 6 | 6 | +0 |
| Verona | 9 | 4 | 1 | 2 | 2 | 6 | 10 | -4 |
| Inter Milan | 8 | 4 | 1 | 2 | 1 | 4 | 4 | +0 |
| Sampdoria | 4 | 4 | 0 | 0 | 4 | 4 | 11 | -7 |

== Final ==
12 June 1971

| Bologna | 1 – 2 | Blackpool |
|---|---|---|
| Pace | | Craven; Burns |

Stadio Renato Dall'Ara, Bologna
Attendance: 26,000
Referee: P. Schiller
