= Les Shannon =

English football player and manager (1926–2007)

- Shannon in 2006

Personal information
- Full name: Leslie Shannon
- Date of birth: 12 March 1926
- Place of birth: Liverpool, Lancashire, England
- Date of death: 2 December 2007 (aged 81)
- Place of death: Leighton Buzzard, Bedfordshire, England
- Height: 5 ft 7 in (1.70 m)
- Positions: Centre forward; inside forward

Senior career*
Years	Team	Apps	(Gls)
1944–1949	Liverpool	11	(1)
1949–1958	Burnley	262	(39)
Total		273	(40)

International career
1952–1956	England B	3	(0)

Managerial career
- 1966–1969: Bury
- 1969–1970: Blackpool
- 1971–1974: PAOK
- 1975–1976: Iraklis
- 1976–1977: Olympiacos
- 1977–1978: Panachaiki
- 1979–1980: OFI
- 1980–1981: Brann
- 1982–1984: OFI
- 1985: Egaleo
- * Club domestic league appearances and goals

Leslie Shannon (12 March 1926 – 2 December 2007) was an English football player and manager.

As a forward, he scored 40 goals in 274 league games in the Football League, playing for Liverpool between November 1944 and November 1949 and then for Burnley from November 1949 to August 1958 following a £6,000 transfer. He also won three caps for the England B team.

He coached at Everton and Arsenal before he embarked on an 18-year career in management in England, Greece, and Norway. He is considered by Greek fans and media to have been one of the most successful foreign managers to ever work in Greek football. His first management role was at Bury from 1966 to 1969; he took the Shakers to promotion out of the Third Division in 1967–68, though they were twice relegated. He took charge at Blackpool, leading the Tangerines to promotion out of the Second Division in 1969–70. He spent the 1970s in Greece and found most of his success with PAOK, taking the club to two Greek Cup titles. He also won the Greek Cup with Iraklis. He also took charge at Olympiacos, Panachaiki, and OFI. He also led the Norwegian side Brann to promotion to the top flight in 1980. He returned to England in 1984 and scouted for Luton Town for 25 years.

== Playing career ==
Shannon was born in Liverpool, he was rejected by Everton for his short stature (5 ft 7 in (1.70 m)). A centre-forward, he instead started his playing career with his hometown club of Liverpool in November 1944. The next year he scored against Merseyside rivals Everton in the Liverpool Senior Cup. He made his debut for George Kay's "Reds" in the Football League four years later, against Manchester City at Anfield on 17 April 1948. His only goal for the Merseyside club came the following season, in a 2–1 win at Sheffield United on 30 August 1948. This was his only goal in ten appearances, and he was dropped from the first team.

He was sold to First Division rivals Burnley for £6,000 November 1949. He dropped back to the inside-forward position, and was described as "a feistily competitive, yet subtly creative, inside-forward cum wing-half". However, he disappointed in the 1949–50 (one goal in eight games) and 1950–51 seasons, before he showed his potential in the 1951–52 (11 goals in 34 games) season. He replaced Billy Morris as Jimmy McIlroy's midfield partner in the 1952–53 campaign, and scored 16 goals in 46 appearances as the "Clarets" posted a sixth-place finish under the stewardship of Frank Hill. Shannon claimed nine goals in 33 matches in the 1953–54 campaign, but after Alan Brown was installed as manager he only found the net just once in 43 appearances in 1954–55. He scored twice in 44 games in 1955–56, claimed two goals in 27 matches in the 1956–57 season, and then scored two goals in 38 games in 1957–58 under Billy Dougall's stewardship. He fell out of the first-team picture under new boss Harry Potts in 1958–59, playing just eight games. Shannon retired from playing first-team football in August 1959, and captained Burnley's reserve team for a year. He scored 44 goals in 281 appearances at Turf Moor.

== Coaching and management ==
In 1959, Shannon moved into youth team coaching with Everton, and remained at Goodison Park for three years. In 1962, he joined Billy Wright's backroom staff at Arsenal, rising to the rank of assistant manager.

After four years at Highbury, Shannon took over as manager of Second Division Bury. Bury finished bottom in his first season in charge, and Shannon was sacked, only to be re-instated two months later following boardroom changes at Gigg Lane. He guided the "Shakers" out of the Third Division the following season as runners-up to Oxford United, only to see them make the drop again in 1968–69.

After Bury's relegation, Shannon replaced Stan Mortensen as manager of Blackpool, with whom he had instant success, finishing as runners-up to Huddersfield Town and winning promotion back to the First Division. This was achieved without the services of the club's star player, Tony Green, who sat out the entire 1969–70 season due to injury. However, in 1970–71, Blackpool finished bottom and were relegated to the league's second tier again. Shannon had left his position only two months into the season and after only 17 months in charge. He was replaced, in a caretaker role, by Jimmy Meadows; his permanent successor at Bloomfield Road was Bob Stokoe.

Shannon accepted an offer to work in Greece in 1971, where he coached PAOK to fifth in Alpha Ethniki in 1971–72. He also led the club to victory in the Greek Cup in 1972 with a 2–1 win over Panathinaikos at the Karaiskakis Stadium; Giorgos Koudas scored both goals. He then took the club to second place in 1972–73, just two points behind rivals Olympiacos. They also had to settle for second place in the Greek Cup, as they lost 1–0 to Olympiacos in the final. In the European Cup-Winners' Cup, they reached the quarter-finals, bowing out to Italian giants AC Milan. He departed the Toumba Stadium following a fourth-place finish in 1973–74. Before leaving, he guided the club to another Greek Cup title, as they beat Olympiacos on penalties.

He moved on to another club of Thessaloniki, Iraklis, with whom he won their first and only major trophy to date, the Greek Cup, in 1976, as they beat Olympiacos on penalties at the Nikos Goumas Stadium. They posted an eighth-place finish in the league in 1975–76, before he departed the Kaftanzoglio Stadium.

Shannon moved on to Piraeus club Olympiacos, taking them to a second-place finish in 1976–77. He then spent six months at the Kostas Davourlis Stadium coaching Panachaiki in Patras, who finished 15th in 1978–79. He then led Crete club OFI to 11th place in 1979–80. He then had an interlude back in England as an adviser with Port Vale.

He had a two-year stay with Brann in Norway, leading Brann to promotion out of 2. divisjon in 1980, and then to tenth place in the 1. divisjon in 1981. He then departed Brann Stadion.

He returned to the Theodoros Vardinogiannis Stadium, leading OFI to seventh and eighth-place finishes in 1982–83 and 1983–84. After this, he returned permanently to Britain, where he settled in Bedfordshire. He became a scout for Luton Town in 1986 and remained at Kenilworth Road until 2001.

== Later life ==
Shannon's knowledge of football led to his working alongside Pelé in co-ordinating the football sequences of the 1981 war movie Escape to Victory. He was also enlisted as an advisor on the Channel 4 series The Manageress in 1989.

Shannon died after a long battle with Alzheimer's disease. At his memorial service at the Square Methodist Church, Dunstable, former Manchester United manager Wilf McGuinness gave a speech. One of the songs chosen was "You'll Never Walk Alone", sung by two of his great nephews, Tom Wing and James Wing, a homage to his beginnings in football.

== Career statistics ==
=== Playing statistics ===
Appearances and goals by club, season and competition
Club	Season	League			FA Cup		Total	
Club	Season	Division	Apps	Goals	Apps	Goals	Apps	Goals
Liverpool	1947–48	First Division	1	0	0	0	1	0
Liverpool	1948–49	First Division	10	1	0	0	10	1
Liverpool	Total		11	1	0	0	11	1
Burnley	1949–50	First Division	8	1	0	0	8	1
Burnley	1950–51	First Division	0	0	0	0	0	0
Burnley	1951–52	First Division	30	9	4	2	34	11
Burnley	1952–53	First Division	42	15	4	1	0	0
Burnley	1953–54	First Division	30	7	3	2	33	9
Burnley	1954–55	First Division	42	1	1	0	43	1
Burnley	1955–56	First Division	41	2	3	0	44	2
Burnley	1956–57	First Division	26	2	1	0	27	1
Burnley	1957–58	First Division	35	2	3	0	38	2
Burnley	1958–59	First Division	8	0	0	0	8	0
Burnley	Total		262	39	19	5	281	44
Career total			273	40	19	5	292	45

=== Managerial statistics ===
Managerial record by team and tenure
Team	From	To	Record				
Team	From	To	P	W	D	L	Win %
Bury	11 July 1966	29 May 1969	144	52	24	68	36.1
Blackpool	29 May 1969	26 October 1970	64	25	19	20	39.1
PAOK	23 February 1971	15 October 1974	152	90	35	27	59.2
Iraklis	3 September 1975	10 June 1976	36	13	11	12	36.1
Olympiacos	11 June 1976	31 May 1977	41	29	6	6	70.7
Total			437	209	95	133	47.8

== Honours ==
Bury

- Football League Third Division second-place promotion: 1967–68

Blackpool

- Football League Second Division second-place promotion: 1969–70

PAOK

- Greek Cup: 1971–72, 1973–74

Iraklis

- Greek Cup: 1975–76

Brann

- 2. divisjon: 1980
