= Micky Burns =

English footballer

Mickey Burns
Personal information
- Full name: Michael Edward Burns
- Date of birth: 21 December 1946 (age 79)
- Place of birth: Preston, England
- Position: Striker

Senior career*
Years	Team	Apps	(Gls)
1964–1965	Preston North End	0	(0)
1965–1969	Skelmersdale United	?	(?)
1969–1974	Blackpool	179	(53)
1974–1978	Newcastle United	145	(39)
1978	Cardiff City	6	(0)
1978–1981	Middlesbrough	61	(24)
Total		391	(116)
- * Club domestic league appearances and goals

Michael Edward Burns (born 21 December 1946) is an English former professional footballer.

== Career ==
A former England amateur international, Burns was signed to Blackpool from the very successful amateur side Skelmersdale United in 1969 by Les Shannon. Burns gained a teaching degree from the De La Salle College of Education at Hopwood Hall in Middleton, Greater Manchester. He was a striker with pace and could score goals. Indeed, he was the Seasiders' top scorer in three of his five seasons at Bloomfield Road.

He scored on his league debut, on 9 August 1969, in a 2–1 home win over Portsmouth, and helped the Tangerines to win promotion back to Division One.

On 10 June 1972, Burns scored four goals in a Blackpool's 10–0 win over Lanerossi Vicenza in the Anglo-Italian Cup, en route to an unsuccessful defence of their title in the final against Roma. He had scored the extra-time winner in the previous year's final that brought the cup to his home county of Lancashire.

He was unpopular with a section of the home fans, who regarded his playing style as too individualistic, and in the summer of 1974, he asked for a transfer. Newcastle United came in for his services for a £166,000 fee.

It was with the Magpies that he played in the 1976 League Cup final in which they lost to Manchester City.

After four years at St James' Park, Burns had a short spell at Cardiff City as a player-coach but he never settled at the club and was allowed to return to the North East to close out his career with Middlesbrough.

== Blackpool F.C. Hall of Fame ==
Burns was inducted into the Hall of Fame at Bloomfield Road, when it was officially opened by former Blackpool player Jimmy Armfield in April 2006. Organised by the Blackpool Supporters Association, Blackpool fans around the world voted on their all-time heroes. Five players from each decade are inducted; Burns is in the 1970s.

== Post-retirement ==
Upon retiring, Burns joined Middlesbrough's coaching staff. He later became the PFA's education officer, a post he left in 2003.

== Honours ==
Blackpool

- Football League Second Division promotion: 1969–70
- Anglo-Italian Cup: 1971

Newcastle United

- Football League Cup runner-up: 1975–76

Individual

- Newcastle United Player of the Year: 1976–77
