= 1976–77 Blackpool F.C. season =

English football club season

Blackpool F.C.
1976–77 season
- Manager: Allan Brown
- Division Two: 5th
- FA Cup: Third round
- League Cup: Third round
- Top goalscorer: League: Mickey Walsh (26); All: Mickey Walsh (28)
Home colours

The 1976–77 season was Blackpool F.C.'s 69th season (66th consecutive) in the Football League. They competed in the 22-team Division Two, then the second tier of English football, finishing fifth. The club came within two points of promotion to the first division.

Former Blackpool player Allan Brown succeeded Harry Potts as manager prior to the start of the season.

Mickey Walsh was the club's top scorer for the third consecutive season, with 28 goals (26 in the league, one in the FA Cup and one in the League Cup).

== Table ==
Pos	Team	Pld	W	D	L	GF	GA	GD	Pts	Qualification or relegation
3	Nottingham Forest (P)	42	21	10	11	77	43	+34	52	Promotion to the First Division
4	Bolton Wanderers	42	20	11	11	75	54	+21	51	
5	Blackpool	42	17	17	8	58	42	+16	51	
6	Luton Town	42	21	6	15	67	48	+19	48	
7	Charlton Athletic	42	16	16	10	71	58	+13	48	

Rules for classification: 1) Points; 2) Goal difference; 3) Goals scored
(P) Promoted
