= 1972–73 Blackpool F.C. season =

English football club season

Blackpool F.C.
1972–73 season
- Manager: Bob Stokoe (succeeded by Harry Potts)
- Division Two: 7th
- FA Cup: Third round
- League Cup: Fifth round
- Anglo-Italian Cup: Fourth round
- Top goalscorer: League: Alan Suddick & Alan Ainscow (10); All: Alan Suddick (13)
Home colours

The 1972–73 season was Blackpool F.C.'s 65th season (62nd consecutive) in the Football League. It was also the 75th anniversary season of their debut in the Football League. They competed in the 22-team Division Two, then the second tier of English football, finishing seventh.

Blackpool's third and final appearance in the Anglo-Italian Cup ended at the fourth-round stage.

Bob Stokoe resigned as manager in November, to take charge at Sunderland. He was succeeded by Harry Potts.

Alan Suddick was the club's top scorer, with thirteen goals (ten in the league, one in the FA Cup and two in the League Cup). Alan Ainscow was the joint-top scorer in the league.

== Table ==
Pos	Team	Pld	W	D	L	GF	GA	GAv	Pts	Qualification or relegation
5	Bristol City	42	17	12	13	63	51	1.235	46	Qualification for the Watney Cup
6	Sunderland	42	17	12	13	59	49	1.204	46	Qualification for the Cup Winners' Cup first round (Note: Sunderland qualified for the Cup Winners' Cup first round as the 1972–73 FA Cup winners.)
7	Blackpool	42	18	10	14	56	51	1.098	46	
8	Oxford United	42	19	7	16	52	43	1.209	45	
9	Fulham	42	16	12	14	58	49	1.184	44	

Rules for classification: 1) Points; 2) Goal average; 3) Goals scored
