= 1968–69 Blackpool F.C. season =

English football club season

Blackpool F.C.
1968–69 season
- Manager: Stan Mortensen
- Division Two: 8th
- FA Cup: Third round
- League Cup: Fifth round
- Top goalscorer: League: Alan Suddick (12); All: Alan Suddick (14)
Home colours

The 1968–69 season was Blackpool F.C.'s 61st season (58th consecutive) in the Football League. They competed in the 22-team Division Two, then the second tier of English football, finishing eighth.

Alan Suddick was the club's top scorer for the second consecutive season, with fourteen goals (twelve in the league and two in the League Cup).

== Table ==
Pos	Team	Pld	W	D	L	GF	GA	GAv	Pts
6	Huddersfield Town	42	17	12	13	53	46	1.152	46
7	Birmingham City	42	18	8	16	73	59	1.237	44
8	Blackpool	42	14	15	13	51	41	1.244	43
9	Sheffield United	42	16	11	15	61	50	1.220	43
10	Millwall	42	17	9	16	57	49	1.163	43

Rules for classification: 1) Points; 2) Goal average; 3) Goals scored
