= 1971–72 Blackpool F.C. season =

English football club season

Blackpool F.C.
1971–72 season
- Manager: Bob Stokoe
- Division Two: 6th
- FA Cup: Third round (Note: Entered competition in third round)
- League Cup: Fifth round (Note: Entered competition in second round)
- Anglo-Italian Cup: Final
- Top goalscorer: League: Micky Burns (17); All: Micky Burns (20)
Home colours

The 1971–72 season was Blackpool F.C.'s 64th season (61st consecutive) in the Football League. They competed in the 22-team Division Two, then the second tier of English football, finishing sixth.

Blackpool's defence of the Anglo-Italian Cup ended in the final against A.S. Roma at the Stadio Olimpico in Rome. The home side won 3–1.

Micky Burns was the club's top scorer for the second consecutive season, with twenty goals (seventeen in the league and three in the League Cup).

== Table ==
Pos	Team	Pld	W	D	L	GF	GA	GAv	Pts	Qualification or relegation
4	Queens Park Rangers	42	20	14	8	57	28	2.036	54	
5	Sunderland	42	17	16	9	67	57	1.175	50	
6	Blackpool	42	20	7	15	70	50	1.400	47	Qualification for the Watney Cup
7	Burnley	42	20	6	16	70	55	1.273	46	Qualification for the Watney Cup
8	Bristol City	42	18	10	14	61	49	1.245	46	

Rules for classification: 1) Points; 2) Goal average; 3) Goals scored
