= 1970–71 Blackpool F.C. season =

English football club season

Blackpool F.C.
1970–71 season
- Manager: Les Shannon (succeeded by Jimmy Meadows, then Bob Stokoe)
- Division One: 22nd (relegated)
- FA Cup: Fourth round
- League Cup: Third round
- Anglo-Italian Cup: Winners
- Top goalscorer: League: Micky Burns (10); All: Micky Burns (10)
Home colours

The 1970–71 season was Blackpool F.C.'s 63rd season (60th consecutive) in the Football League. They competed in the 22-team Division One, then the top tier of English football, finishing bottom. As a result, they were relegated back to Division Two a season after their promotion from it, and did not compete in the top flight again until 2010–11.

Blackpool won the Anglo-Italian Cup for the first and only time, beating Bologna 2–1 in the final at the Stadio Renato Dall'Ara in the Italian city.

Les Shannon left his position as manager during the season after only seventeen months in charge. He was replaced, in a caretaker manager role, by Jimmy Meadows. Meadows was, in turn, succeeded by Bob Stokoe.

Micky Burns was the club's top scorer, with ten goals.

Jimmy Armfield retired at the end of the season after seventeen years of service for Blackpool, his only professional club. His final appearance was against Manchester United at Bloomfield Road, in front of a crowd of 30,000. He had come back from an injury lay-off to make his swan song. His 569 appearances remains a club record.

== Table ==
| Pos | Team | Pld | W | D | L | GF | GA | GAv | Pts | Qualification or relegation |
|---|---|---|---|---|---|---|---|---|---|---|
| 18 | Crystal Palace | 42 | 12 | 11 | 19 | 39 | 57 | 0.684 | 35 | |
| 19 | Ipswich Town | 42 | 12 | 10 | 20 | 42 | 48 | 0.875 | 34 | |
| 20 | West Ham United | 42 | 10 | 14 | 18 | 47 | 60 | 0.783 | 34 | |
| 21 | Burnley (R) | 42 | 7 | 13 | 22 | 29 | 63 | 0.460 | 27 | Relegation to the Second Division |
| 22 | Blackpool (R) | 42 | 4 | 15 | 23 | 34 | 66 | 0.515 | 23 | Relegation to the Second Division |

Source: World Football
Rules for classification: 1) Points; 2) Goal average; 3) Goals scored
(R) Relegated
