= 1969–70 Blackpool F.C. season =

English football club season

Blackpool F.C.
1969–70 season
- Manager: Les Shannon
- Division Two: 2nd (promoted)
- FA Cup: Fourth round
- League Cup: Third round
- Top goalscorer: League: Fred Pickering (17); All: Fred Pickering (18)
Home colours

The 1969–70 season was Blackpool F.C.'s 62nd season (59th consecutive) in the Football League. They competed in the 22-team Division Two, then the second tier of English football, finishing second. As a result, they were promoted to Division One after an absence of three seasons.

This was Les Shannon's first season as manager, after his succession of Stan Mortensen. He was installed by new chairman Bill Gregson.

Fred Pickering was the club's top scorer, with eighteen goals (seventeen in the league and one in the FA Cup).

== Table ==
Pos	Team	Pld	W	D	L	GF	GA	GAv	Pts	Qualification or relegation
1	Huddersfield Town (C, P)	42	24	12	6	68	37	1.838	60	Promotion to the First Division
2	Blackpool (P)	42	20	13	9	56	45	1.244	53	Promotion to the First Division
3	Leicester City	42	19	13	10	64	50	1.280	51	
4	Middlesbrough	42	20	10	12	55	45	1.222	50	
5	Swindon Town	42	17	16	9	57	47	1.213	50	

Rules for classification: 1) Points; 2) Goal average; 3) Goals scored
(C) Champions; (P) Promoted
