= 1974–75 Blackpool F.C. season =

English football club season

Blackpool F.C.
1974–75 season
- Manager: Harry Potts
- Division Two: 7th
- FA Cup: Third round
- League Cup: Second round
- Top goalscorer: League: Mickey Walsh (12); All: Mickey Walsh (13)
Home colours

The 1974–75 season was Blackpool F.C.'s 67th season (64th consecutive) in the Football League. They competed in the 22-team Division Two, then the second tier of English football, finishing seventh.

Mickey Walsh was the club's top scorer, with thirteen goals (twelve in the league and one in the League Cup).

Glyn James retired at the end of the season after fifteen years of service for Blackpool, his only professional club.

On 24 August, 18-year-old Blackpool fan Kevin Olsson was fatally stabbed in the Bloomfield Road stands during the Blackpool v. Bolton Wanderers League match. No arrest was ever made for the murder. 25 years later, a plaque commemorating Olsson was installed on the exterior wall of Bloomfield Road's North-West Stand.

== Table ==
Pos	Team	Pld	W	D	L	GF	GA	GAv	Pts
5	Bristol City	42	21	8	13	47	33	1.424	50
6	West Bromwich Albion	42	18	9	15	54	42	1.286	45
7	Blackpool	42	14	17	11	38	33	1.152	45
8	Hull City	42	15	14	13	40	53	0.755	44
9	Fulham	42	13	16	13	44	39	1.128	42

Rules for classification: 1) Points; 2) Goal average; 3) Goals scored
