= 1975–76 Blackpool F.C. season =

English football club season

Blackpool F.C.
1975–76 season
- Manager: Harry Potts
- Division Two: 10th
- FA Cup: Fourth round
- League Cup: Second round
- Top goalscorer: League: Mickey Walsh (17); All: Mickey Walsh (17)
Home colours

The 1975–76 season was Blackpool F.C.'s 68th season (65th consecutive) in the Football League. They competed in the 22-team Division Two, then the second tier of English football, finishing tenth, with a symmetrical record of fourteen wins, fourteen draws and fourteen losses.

Mickey Walsh was the club's top scorer for the second consecutive season, with seventeen goals.

== Table ==
Pos	Team	Pld	W	D	L	GF	GA	GAv	Pts
8	Nottingham Forest	42	17	12	13	55	40	1.375	46
9	Charlton Athletic	42	15	12	15	61	72	0.847	42
10	Blackpool	42	14	14	14	40	49	0.816	42
11	Chelsea	42	12	16	14	53	54	0.981	40
12	Fulham	42	13	14	15	45	47	0.957	40

Rules for classification: 1) Points; 2) Goal average; 3) Goals scored
