= 1973–74 Blackpool F.C. season =

English football club season

Blackpool F.C.
1973–74 season
- Manager: Harry Potts
- Division Two: 5th
- FA Cup: Third round
- League Cup: Second round
- Top goalscorer: League: Micky Burns (14); All: Micky Burns (17)
Home colours

The 1973–74 season was Blackpool F.C.'s 66th season (63rd consecutive) in the Football League. They competed in the 22-team Division Two, then the second tier of English football, finishing fifth.

This was Harry Potts' first full season in charge.

Micky Burns was the club's top scorer, with seventeen goals (fourteen in the league and three in the League Cup).

Alan Suddick scored his 100th League goal, a penalty, in Blackpool's 3–0 victory over Preston North End at Bloomfield Road on 23 March 1974.

== Table ==
Pos	Team	Pld	W	D	L	GF	GA	GAv	Pts	Qualification or relegation
3	Carlisle United (P)	42	20	9	13	61	48	1.271	49	Promotion to the First Division
4	Orient	42	15	18	9	55	42	1.310	48	
5	Blackpool	42	17	13	12	57	40	1.425	47	
6	Sunderland	42	19	9	14	58	44	1.318	47	
7	Nottingham Forest	42	15	15	12	57	43	1.326	45	

Rules for classification: 1) Points; 2) Goal average; 3) Goals scored
(P) Promoted
