= Harry Potts =

English footballer and manager (1920–1996)

Personal information
- Full name: Harold Potts
- Date of birth: 22 October 1920
- Place of birth: Hetton-le-Hole, England
- Date of death: 16 January 1996 (aged 75)
- Place of death: Burnley, England
- Position: Inside forward

Youth career
- 1937–1946: Burnley

Senior career*
Years	Team	Apps	(Gls)
1946–1950	Burnley	165	(47)
1950–1956	Everton	59	(15)
Total		224	(62)

Managerial career
- 1957–1958: Shrewsbury Town
- 1958–1970: Burnley
- 1972–1976: Blackpool
- 1977–1979: Burnley
- * Club domestic league appearances and goals

Harold Potts (22 October 1920 – 16 January 1996) was an English football player and manager. As a player he won promotion with both Burnley and Everton, and both from Second Division. As Burnley manager, he guided them to the First Division championship in 1959–60, the Anglo-Scottish Cup in 1978–79 and an unsuccessful appearance in the 1962 FA Cup Final.

== Early life ==
Potts was born in Hetton-le-Hole, County Durham, as was another well-known name in football, Bob Paisley. The duo spent much of their childhood playing various sports, but it was football that Potts loved most. A promising young footballer as well as a good scholar, he was forced to choose between sport and studies, and he chose football as his career.

== Playing career ==
Potts joined Burnley, who had one of the first youth-development systems in football; however, his own development was interrupted by the outbreak of the Second World War in 1939, which came before he could make his début for the club. He served for the Royal Air Force, mainly in India as a PT instructor. Although playing for the club in a few wartime fixtures, his first league action for Burnley came after its conclusion. He took time to return to the form that saw him regarded as a promising youngster, but he eventually became a success as a Burnley player.

He made his Burnley first team début on 31 August 1946, in a position then referred to as "inside-left", which would now be considered one of the striker positions. He wore the number 10 shirt associated with that position, and played in all but two of Burnley's 42 games in the Second Division that season, becoming the club's leading goalscorer with fifteen goals. The Clarets finished second in the table and were promoted. They also reached the FA Cup Final at Wembley. Potts played all nine of Burnley's cup games, including the final, which Charlton Athletic won 1–0.

In the following season, the challenge of top-flight football did not seem to slow his progression. Burnley finished third, and Potts scored fourteen goals in the 38-game season. Burnley settled into a mid-table position over the next few years, and Potts added to his tally of goals. He eventually got 47 from 165 matches, before moving to Everton in October 1950. His next Burnley match would have been a trip to his native Sunderland. In his stead, future Burnley star Jimmy McIlroy would make his début at inside-left.

Everton were relegated in his first season with the Liverpool-based club. They were promoted in 1954 and then spent two top-flight seasons in mid-table. He ended his career as a player at Everton in 1956, having scored 15 in 59 League games for the club.

== Managerial career ==
After Potts left Everton, he was offered a coaching job at Leeds United but turned it down. After working for Wolverhampton Wanderers as chief scout, Potts took the more senior position of manager at Third Division South side Shrewsbury Town. He spent just over half a season at the Shropshire club before Burnley lured him back to become their manager in February 1958.

Burnley finished 1957–58 in sixth position and in his first full season in charge (1958–59) Burnley finished 7th. Potts made his first cash signing for the club, left back Alex Elder. His second cash signing was made eight years later.

1959–60 brought Burnley's their second league championship success (their first came in 1921). The following season the club represented England in the European Cup, reaching the quarter-finals. In 1962 Burnley were runners-up in both the FA Cup and First Division.

In 1963, when forced to sell Jimmy McIlroy to raise funds for the club, Potts's relationship with Burnley fans suffered. This dissipated, and Potts stayed on to steer the Clarets to European competition again, in the Inter-Cities Fairs Cup (now the UEFA Cup) in 1966–67.

Potts' last match as Burnley manager came on 21 February 1970 with a 5–0 win against Nottingham Forest. He moved into a more executive position of general manager. This was an unwanted and unhappy move for Potts, and he left Burnley just over two years later.

In December 1972, Potts became manager of Second Division side Blackpool. He guided the Seasiders to a seventh-place finish in the league, while his former club, Burnley, won the championship. His first full season in charge, 1973–74, almost ended in success. After leading Sunderland 1–0 with only seven minutes to go in their final match of the season, the team lost 2–1 and missed out on the third promotion place, which was filled by Carlisle United. He was named the division's Manager of the Month for December, and was presented with the award prior to Blackpool's home game with Luton Town on 22 December.

Potts bought wisely but expensively, most notably on players such as John Evanson, Wyn Davies and Paul Hart. The club demanded an instant return of results, and Potts walked a tightrope for the remainder of his Bloomfield Road career.

By the end of the 1975–76 campaign, chants of "Potts out" began to be heard, and with the team managing to finish only tenth, the board sacked him in May. As of 2013, Potts is the joint-ninth-longest-serving Blackpool manager in terms of Football League games in charge, alongside Ian Holloway.

Potts was re-hired by Burnley, becoming their chief scout in 1976. After a poor start to the 1976–77 season, manager Joe Brown was sacked in February and Potts became manager for the second time.

Burnley ended the season in 16th in the Second Division, two points clear of relegation. 1977–78 saw them finish mid-table and so did 1978–79, a season which saw them win the Anglo-Scottish Cup. The following season (1979–80) began badly, and Potts was sacked after a run of eleven games without a win. Burnley were relegated to the Third Division at the end of the season.

== Managerial statistics ==
Correct as of May 2015

Team	Nat	From	To	Record				
Team	Nat	From	To	G	W	D	L	Win %
Shrewsbury Town	(England)	1 June 1957	1 February 1958	31	11	9	11	
Burnley	(England)	1 February 1958	1 February 1970	605	272	142	191	
Blackpool	(England)	1 January 1972	5 May 1976	208	83	60	65	
Burnley	(England)	20 February 1977	16 October 1979	140	49	35	56	
Total				984	415	246	323	

== Death ==
Potts died on 16 January 1996, aged 75, after a long illness. Before his illness got too restrictive, he often attended Burnley matches. Burnley remembered him on his funeral day, as the 1959–60 title winning side, plus many of his former players, colleagues and Burnley supporters gathered at Turf Moor to pay their respects as his cortège stopped outside the stadium. The streets had been blocked to traffic for this occasion.

In 2001, a section of Brunshaw Road which runs past the stadium was renamed "Harry Potts Way" in his honour.

== Honours ==
=== As a player ===
Burnley

- Football League Second Division second-place promotion: 1946–47
- FA Cup runner-up: 1946–47

Everton

- Football League Second Division second-place promotion: 1953–54

=== As a manager ===
Burnley

- Football League First Division: 1959–60
- Anglo-Scottish Cup: 1978–79
- FA Cup runner-up: 1961–62

== See also ==
- List of English football championship winning managers
