= Bob Stokoe =

English footballer and manager (1930–2004)

Personal information
- Full name: Robert Stokoe
- Date of birth: 21 September 1930
- Place of birth: Mickley, England
- Date of death: 1 February 2004 (aged 73)
- Place of death: Hartlepool, England
- Position: Centre half

Youth career
- 1946–1950: Newcastle United

Senior career*
Years	Team	Apps	(Gls)
1950–1960	Newcastle United	261	(4)
1960–1964	Bury	82	(0)
Total		343	(4)

Managerial career
- 1961–1965: Bury
- 1965–1967: Charlton Athletic
- 1967–1968: Rochdale
- 1968–1970: Carlisle United
- 1970–1972: Blackpool
- 1972–1976: Sunderland
- 1977–1978: Bury
- 1978–1979: Blackpool
- 1979–1980: Rochdale
- 1980–1985: Carlisle United
- 1985–1986: Carlisle United
- 1987: Sunderland
- * Club domestic league appearances and goals

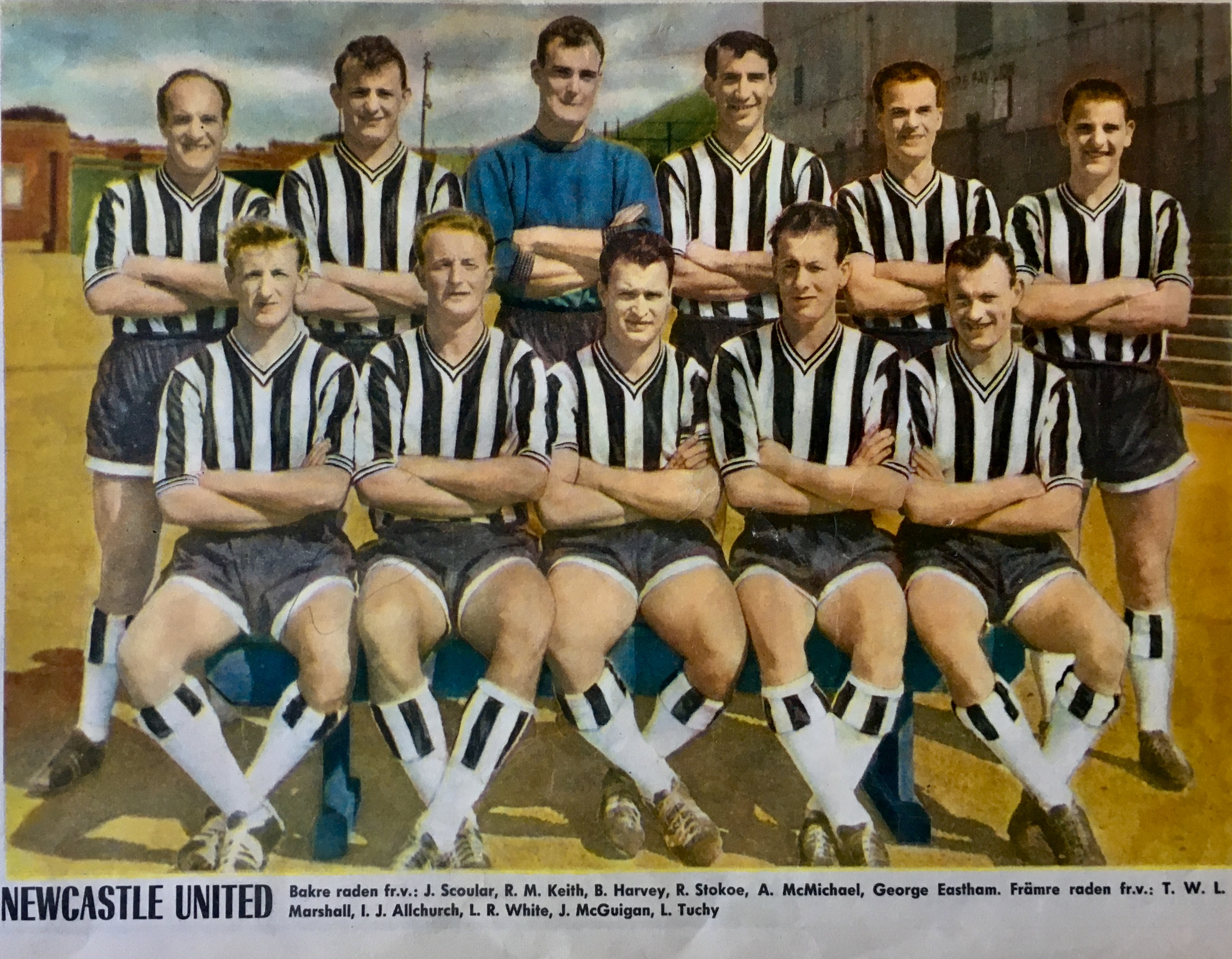
Newcastle United in 1960. Back row (from the left): Jimmy Scoular, Dick Keith, Bryan Harvey (goalkeeper), Bob Stokoe, Alf McMichael and George Eastham. Front row: "Terry" W. L. Marshall, Ivor Allchurch, Len White, John McGuigan and Liam Tuohy.

Robert Stokoe (21 September 1930 – 1 February 2004) was an English footballer and manager who was able, almost uniquely, to transcend the traditional north-east animosity between the region's footballing rivals, Newcastle United and Sunderland. As a player, he won an FA Cup winner's medal with Newcastle in 1955. As a manager, he guided Blackpool to victory in the 1971 Anglo-Italian Cup final. Two years later, he led Sunderland to success in the 1973 FA Cup final, and followed it up with promotion from the Second Division in 1975–76.

== Playing career ==
Born in Mickley, near Prudhoe, Northumberland, the son of a miner, Stokoe began his footballing career at Newcastle United, signing for them as an apprentice in 1947 and playing the first of 261 games, usually as centre-half, on Christmas Day 1950 against Middlesbrough, a game in which he also scored. The highlight of his 13 years at Newcastle was the 3–1 1955 FA Cup final victory over Manchester City. After leaving Newcastle and joining Bury in February 1961, Stokoe spent a short time as a player, leading the team in an undefeated run to promotion, before making the move into management with the same club as player-manager the following season.

== Management career ==
Stokoe took the post of player-manager at Bury in December 1961 which, at 31 years of age, made him the second-youngest manager in the Football League. He led them to the semi-finals of the League Cup in 1962–63. He retired from playing in 1964, staying on as manager for another year after which he moved south to take charge at Charlton Athletic from 1965 to 1967. He was manager of Rochdale from 1967 to 1968, followed by three separate spells at Carlisle United (1968–1970, 1980–1985 and 1985–1986).

When Carlisle faced Aston Villa on 28 December 1968 in the Second Division, Stokoe got into a war of words with Villa manager, Tommy Docherty. With many matches postponed due to weather, the media spotlight fell on this match. Carlisle were previously thirteen matches unbeaten but were undone by a single Willie Anderson goal on a rock-hard pitch. Stokoe was ungracious in defeat stating "I would rather sweep the streets than play like that..." referring to Villa's negative play and time-wasting tactics. Docherty hit back at Stokoe stating "he could get his fingers burnt" and threatened a complaint to the Football League. The bad blood continued through to the following season's fixture at Villa Park. Before the game, a Villa player pushed open the visitor's dressing room door and threw in a broom.

=== Blackpool ===
Between spells at Carlisle, Stokoe managed Blackpool from 1970 to 1972. He was initially approached by the club in the summer of 1969, after the departure of Stan Mortensen. At the time, he declined, preferring to stay with Carlisle; just over eighteen months later, however, he became the ninth official manager in Blackpool's history.

With Blackpool relegated to the Second Division before he took over, Stokoe began to clear out the "deadwood" and rebuilt the side more to his liking. Stokoe agreed to sell Tony Green to his old club, Newcastle, bringing striker Keith Dyson in the opposite direction.

Before the departure of Green, Blackpool enjoyed a successful venture into Europe, winning the Anglo-Italian Cup in June 1971. In the league, meanwhile, the Seasiders finished in sixth place. This still was not good enough for the fans, however, who became disenchanted with life outside the top flight again, and the club's style of play under Stokoe was not to their liking.

Another successful run in the Anglo-Italian Cup the following season, when Blackpool finished as runners-up to Roma, kept the critics at bay, but the feeling around Bloomfield Road was that the 1972–73 campaign would be critical.

Stokoe's third season at Blackpool started well enough when, with the team reasonably placed for a promotion push and having stated that he intended to remain at the club for five years, he left the club. He had been lured back to his native north-east by Sunderland.

=== Sunderland ===
Stokoe took over as manager of Sunderland on 29 November 1972 when they were fourth from bottom of the Second Division table after a run of just four wins in 18 games. Although his first game in charge was lost 1–0 at home to Burnley, the following week seemingly liberated players won 3–2 away at Portsmouth, starting a run of 32 games, with only five defeats. Just six months later, on 5 May 1973, having already beaten Manchester City and Arsenal on their way to the FA Cup final, Stokoe took the Second Division club to Wembley and defeated the cup holders Leeds United to secure Sunderland's first FA Cup title since 1937. Managed by Don Revie, whom Stokoe had opposed when playing for Newcastle United in their 1955 FA Cup final victory over Manchester City, Leeds United were a team packed with international players and strong favourites to retain the trophy. However, Sunderland scored in the first half through Ian Porterfield and with the help of a memorable second-half match-saving double save from goalkeeper Jim Montgomery, managed to win 1–0. The victory was the first time a Second Division team had won the Cup in 42 years. Stokoe is remembered for his impromptu jubilant run down the pitch at the end of the game, complete in Mackintosh and his trilby hat, to celebrate the victory with Montgomery. A statue of Stokoe with his arms held aloft in celebratory mid-run now stands outside Sunderland's Stadium of Light. None of the Sunderland players had been capped at the highest level when they lifted the cup, though some were capped later. Sunderland finished 6th in the Second Division that season and narrowly missed promotion in the following two seasons.

In 1975–76, he guided the club to the Second Division title. He tendered his resignation the following season after they struggled in the First Division with a start of nine straight games without a victory.

=== Later years ===
In May 1978, Stokoe returned to Blackpool with the club in dire straits. Under the management of Allan Brown they had been relegated to the Third Division for the first time in their history and were looking for someone who could rebuild the club. He guided them to a mid-table finishing position, and then resigned again before the start of the 1979–80 season.

There followed another spell with Rochdale (1979–1980) which ended with the club having to seek re-election to the League and spells with Carlisle United (1980–1985 and 1985–1986). He led Carlisle to promotion to the Second Division in 1982, and in the 1983–84 season they became promotion contenders before a poor run saw them finish 7th. He resigned in 1985, only to be reappointed and resign again seven months later.

Towards the end of the 1986–87 season, he was appointed caretaker manager of Sunderland as they struggled in the Second Division. They narrowly lost on the away goals rule, in the end-of-season relegation-promotion playoffs and were relegated to the Third Division for the first time in their history. His contract was not renewed and he retired from football. During his whole career as a manager he was never sacked by any of his clubs.

== Death ==
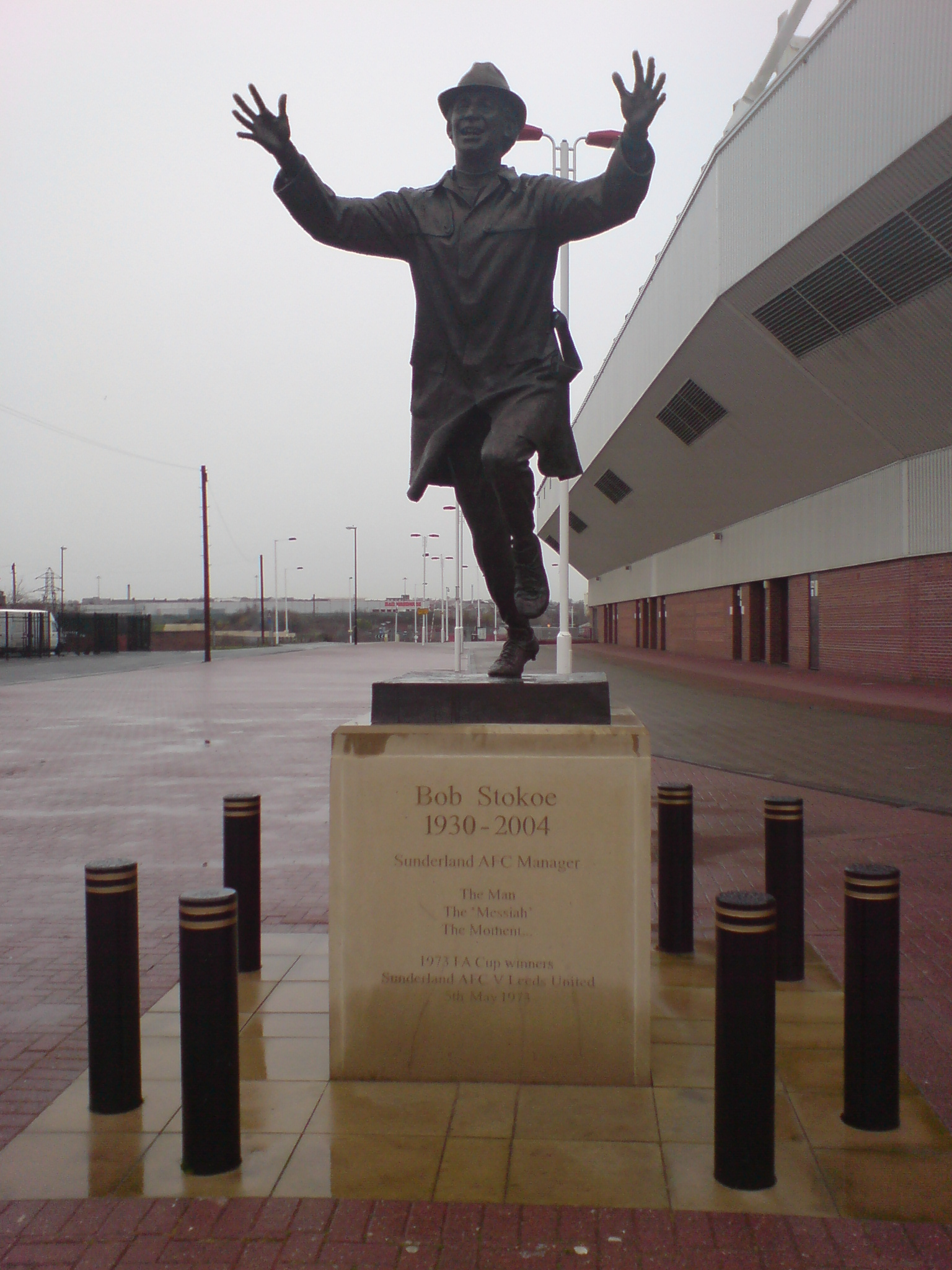
A statue of Stokoe stands outside Sunderland's Stadium of Light.

After being unwell for some time with Alzheimer's disease, Stokoe was admitted to hospital in Hartlepool suffering from pneumonia and died on 1 February 2004 aged 73. The respect offered by both rival fan groups of Newcastle United and Sunderland was marked by their attendance at his funeral at the crematorium at Newcastle upon Tyne. The Reverend Neil Cockling, the Methodist Minister for Prudhoe, who conducted the service, told mourners: "He will be remembered by all as a real gentleman. Such was Bob's standing that we can see Sunderland and Newcastle here together today to celebrate his life."

== Career statistics ==
Managerial record by team and tenure
Team	From	To	Record				
Team	From	To	P	W	D	L	Win %
Bury	13 December 1961	11 August 1965	166	61	37	68	36.7
Charlton Athletic	12 August 1965	23 May 1967	89	26	23	40	29.2
Rochdale	1 October 1967	1 October 1968	49	13	16	20	26.5
Carlisle United	2 October 1968	30 May 1970	86	37	22	27	43.0
Blackpool	20 December 1970	23 November 1972	80	28	24	28	35.0
Sunderland	23 November 1972	18 October 1976	197	92	49	56	46.7
Bury	17 November 1977	20 May 1978	32	9	12	11	28.1
Blackpool	20 May 1978	17 August 1979	46	18	9	19	39.1
Rochdale	20 November 1979	1 June 1980	34	7	10	17	20.6
Carlisle United	10 June 1980	30 May 1985	252	89	70	93	35.3
Carlisle United	14 September 1985	10 May 1986	39	14	5	20	35.9
Sunderland	16 April 1987	9 June 1987	9	3	2	4	33.3
			1,079	397	279	403	36.8

== Honours ==
=== As a player ===
Newcastle United

- FA Cup: 1954–55

=== As a manager ===
Blackpool

- Anglo-Italian Cup: 1971

Sunderland

- FA Cup: 1972–73
- Football League Second Division: 1975–76
