= History of Blackpool F.C. (1962–present) =

History of an English football club

This is a history of Blackpool Football Club from 1962 to the present. For their history between 1887 and 1962, see History of Blackpool F.C. (1887–1962). For the club's season-by-season stats, see Blackpool F.C. seasons.

Blackpool F.C.'s finishing positions in the Football League since 1963

The history of Blackpool Football Club between 1962 and the present day covers the periods of relative decline after their successful first half of the 20th century.

Blackpool spent the years between 1962 and 1967 in Division One, before being relegated to the second tier of English football for the first time since 1936–37. After three seasons in Division Two, the club returned to the top flight, but only for one season. In the decade between 1972 and 1982, Blackpool dropped down two more divisions, to Division Four, and in 1982–83 hit their lowest finishing point: 89th out of the total 92 League clubs.

In the years since Blackpool managed to climb into the upper reaches of the pyramid again. After five promotions and one relegation, the club reached the Premier League, the top tier of English football, in 2010–11; from 2013 to 2014 onwards, however, another decline occurred. As of the end of the 2014–15 season, the club had won just 15 league games out of the last 92 (or two full league seasons). This equates to 45 points out of a possible 276. They also failed to win in the first five league fixtures of the 2015–16 campaign, under new manager Neil McDonald.

Under Gary Bowyer's stewardship, Blackpool returned to the third tier at the end of the 2016–17 season. They remained there for four more seasons, before climbing into the second tier in 2020–21. Both of these promotions were again done via the play-offs — the club's sixth success in play-off finals in eight appearances.

== The post-Matthews era ==
With the maximum wage now abolished, Blackpool, like many other clubs, found it difficult to attract the top players to their club, and, indeed, keep the ones they had.

In 1962–63, Ray Charnley scored 22 goals, and a hard-tackling defender, John McPhee, made his debut. In addition, a young Alan Ball came onto the scene. Another chapter ended, however, when Bill Perry ended his thirteen-year association with the club. He was transfer-listed the previous summer, and Southport came in for his services.

During pre-season, Blackpool was invited to partake in the international Costa del Sol tournament at the Estadio La Rosaleda in Málaga. Along with the hosts, Málaga CF, AS Monaco and Real Madrid, they made up the four-team competition. The Seasiders were defeated 4–1 by Real Madrid, but they beat Monaco in the third/fourth place play-off the following day.

Another flirtation with relegation in 1963–64 fed the flames of Ron Suart's critics, and attendances dropped accordingly. Ball was the top scorer with thirteen goals.

There was little improvement in 1964–65, with a finishing position of 17th. There was a mid-season period where the team went 15 games without victory, including 8 consecutive defeats, which equalled the club record set in 1898–99. Charnley returned to the top of the goalscoring charts, with 21 strikes, but already the bigger clubs were keeping a very close eye on Alan Ball. Newcomers included Ian Moir and Jimmy Robson, but Roy Gratrix left the club after 11 years of service, and goalkeeper Gordon West joined Everton. Blackpool's debut on Match of the Day occurred with their visit to Craven Cottage to face Fulham on 21 November 1964. The match finished 3-3, with the visitors' Alan Ball netting a hat-trick.

In May and June 1965, Blackpool and Sheffield United were invited to tour New Zealand as a pre-season warm-up. As a result of an unsuccessful tour by the New Zealand national team the previous year, it was decided not to have any local sides involved in the tour. Consequently, the only matches played were between the two visiting clubs. Sheffield United won the ten-game series 6–4.

At the end of the 1965–66 season and after England's victory in the 1966 World Cup Final, during which he played, Alan Ball was sold to Everton for £112,000, Blackpool's record transfer fee receipt at that point, and so started a trend that would become increasingly familiar. Prior to his departure, Ball, along with Jimmy Armfield, was honoured by Blackpool's mayor councillor, Robert Brierley, JP, in a civic reception at Town Hall. Armfield stated: "It is a great privilege to be so honoured by the town and something I have hitherto only dreamed of. As far as the World Cup is concerned, it was a disappointment to me that I didn't get a game. But Blackpool Football Club's colours were kept flying for both of us by Alan, particularly in the Final."

New names Hugh Fisher, Ronnie Brown, goalkeeper and local boy Alan Taylor, and – for the final game of the season – Emlyn Hughes all made their debuts. Hughes, however, only made 33 appearances for Blackpool before Liverpool manager Bill Shankly bought him for £65,000.

Ray Charnley and Alan Ball shared the goalscoring spoils, with 16 in the League apiece, although Charnley edged the overall accolade with nineteen strikes in all competitions. The team finished 13th in the League but exited the FA Cup at the first hurdle and the League Cup at the second.

After so many near escapes over the years, Blackpool was finally relegated to Division Two at the end of the 1966–67 campaign after picking up only seven points (including one victory) at Bloomfield Road. On the road, however, Blackpool managed to beat both Liverpool and Everton, who went on to finish fifth and sixth, respectively. They also returned from a New Year's Eve trip to Southampton with both points after a 5–1 victory, including a hat-trick by Ray Charnley. This was all achieved with the help of two new forwards: Alan Skirton from Arsenal and Alan Suddick from Newcastle United for a Blackpool then-club-record outlay of £63,000.

In February 1967, Ron Suart, who had been under pressure for several seasons, was finally forced to resign after nine years in the hot seat. He was replaced by one of the club's most popular figures, Stan Mortensen.

Morty immediately began to dismantle the team, and was not afraid of making unpopular decisions, as evidenced by the sale of Ray Charnley to Preston North End after a heavy home defeat to Millwall. He brought in Gerry Ingram, a tall centre-forward, from Hull City; Tom White from Crystal Palace; the tricky Tommy Hutchison from Alloa Athletic; and the discovery of them all, Tony Green from Albion Rovers, who went on to fill the gap left by Alan Ball's departure 12 months earlier.

Blackpool spent the 1967–68 season challenging hard for promotion, and after six consecutive victories they went into the final game, at Huddersfield Town, knowing that two points would likely secure a return to the First Division. They did win, 6–3, but after the premature celebrations had died down, there came the news that their nearest rivals, Queens Park Rangers, had won at Villa Park by virtue of a last-minute own-goal. Q.P.R.'s 0.21 better goal-difference meant they were promoted alongside champions Ipswich Town.

For the following season, Stan Mortensen continued his rebuilding scheme in preparation for another push at promotion. Leslie Lea was sold to Cardiff City, Ian Moir to Chester City, Gerry Ingram to Preston North End, Graham Oates to Grimsby Town, and Alan Skirton to Bristol City. In addition to leaving room for new blood, the sales helped the rather shaky financial situation, something which had now become commonplace at Bloomfield Road.

Bill Bentley was signed from Stoke City, and he took over the left-back position, while Terry Alcock, signed one year earlier from Port Vale, had now broken into the first team. After the previous season's finish, eighth this time around was looked upon as a disappointment amongst the fans.

The board, perhaps panicked into action by a lack of immediate success and disturbed by rumours of player indiscipline, sacked Mortensen. Their decision was met with a mixture of shock and anger by the Blackpool faithful, as Mortensen was as popular a manager as he was a player. Former Seasiders skipper Harry Johnston stepped in for the few remaining games of the campaign.

Blackpool adopted this crest for the start of the 1969–70 campaign, although the initials minus the encompassing circle appeared for the previous season.

Les Shannon was appointed as Mortensen's successor on 1 May 1969, and the Liverpudlian succeeded in taking the club back to the First Division in his first season. Shannon brought in players such as Micky Burns, who had cost nothing from Skelmersdale United, Dave Hatton and the veteran Fred Pickering, with Harry Thomson becoming the latest in Blackpool's line of Scottish goalkeepers.

Promotion was gained on an emotional night at Preston North End's Deepdale stadium in the West Lancashire derby, when a Fred Pickering hat-trick gave Blackpool a 3–0 victory. The capacity 34,000 attendance included some 20,000 Blackpool fans who had made that short trip, and their joy was enhanced by the fact that the result had placed their arch-rivals in even deeper trouble at the foot of the table; indeed, Preston were relegated to the Third Division for the first time in their history not long afterwards.

The 1970–71 season was simply disastrous for Blackpool. The same team that had achieved success the previous season found life in Division One remarkably difficult. Only four victories were achieved, and at the end of the season, they were relegated, along with Lancashire neighbours Burnley, whence they came. Even the return of Tony Green after a long injury lay-off failed to inspire the team. The fact that 28 players were used illustrates that there was no consistency in Shannon's starting-eleven selections.

On 24 October 1970, in a 4–3 home defeat by Chelsea, Blackpool had led 3–0 at half-time. Shannon made the inexplicable decision to substitute the most effective man on the pitch, Fred Pickering. Shannon had little option but to resign from his brief-but-eventful career at Bloomfield Road.

Shannon was replaced temporarily by Jimmy Meadows as caretaker manager. In December 1970, the board appointed Bob Stokoe, a man who the club had tried to lure away from Carlisle United a year earlier, as the new full-time manager. Stokoe's arrival was too late to save the club, and Blackpool would play host to Second Division football once more.

During the summer of 1971, Blackpool had a chance to regain some pride when they entered the Anglo-Italian Cup. The competition involved 12 teams – 6 from England and 6 from Italy – with the winners from each group meeting in the final. Blackpool finished top of the English group by winning twice, drawing once and losing the other, and scored far more goals than any other team in their four qualifying matches.

The final, against Bologna at their Stadio Renato Dall'Ara, was played in front of 40,000 fans who saw Blackpool win 2–1 after extra time. The victory gave the club a morale-boost for the forthcoming League season, and the next day thousands of ecstatic Blackpool fans lined the promenade and gathered outside the town hall to welcome them home.

For the 1971–72 season, Bob Stokoe began player clearout, with a view to trimming a large playing staff. Amongst those leaving were Fred Pickering, Fred Kemp, Alan Taylor, Graham Rowe and Jimmy Armfield. The latter had retired from playing after the final game of the previous season, against Manchester United at Bloomfield Road, after giving seventeen years of service to the club. His 569 Football League appearances for the club remains a record.

New faces included goalkeepers John "Budgie" Burridge and George Wood, Chris Simpkin and Dave Lennard, and finally Keith Dyson. Dyson came in a part-exchange deal that took Tony Green to Tyneside and boosted Blackpool's finances to the tune of £150,000.

On the field, a sixth-placed finish was achieved, and there was a run to the quarter-finals of the League Cup, where Blackpool was beaten by eventual winners Tottenham Hotspur.

In the summer of 1972, Blackpool attempted to defend their hold on the Anglo-Italian Cup, and they made it to the final once again. En route, they won all of their group matches, including a 10–0 home victory over Lanerossi Vicenza, which remains their record victory. In the final, however, they met far stiffer competition in the form of A.S. Roma and were soundly beaten 3–1 in front of 70,000 fans at the Stadio Olimpico.

In the 1972–73 season, seventh place was achieved, as well as another appearance in the League Cup quarter-finals, in which a late goal in the replay gave Wolves victory.

The season's main transfer dealing involved Tommy Hutchison, who left for Coventry City, with Billy Rafferty going in the opposite direction. The biggest change, however, came in the manager's office when Bob Stokoe left in November for Sunderland in his native North-East.

Harry Potts, who was chased by Blackpool as a player in the 1950s, was appointed as manager in the new year. In Potts' first season, 1973–74, Blackpool finished fifth. If they had won at Stokoe's Sunderland on the final day of the season, they would have edged out Carlisle United on goal-difference for promotion. As it was, Carlisle won and Blackpool lost 2–1.

The squad had been strengthened with the additions of veteran Wyn Davies, future prolific scorer Mickey Walsh, and promising defender Paul Hart. At the end of the 1973–74 campaign, in May, Blackpool travelled to Casale Monferrato in northern Italy to partake in the "Caligaris" International Tournament, an under-21 knockout tournament named after local legend Umberto Caligaris. Tour manager Eddie Quigley and coach Ray Pointer, along with athletics coach Jack Chapman, were in charge of the seventeen young Blackpool players who made the trip. The tournament was structured along the lines of the World Cup Finals, with each team appearing in a group of four.

Blackpool's opening game in the tournament was a goalless draw with Napoli. This was followed by a 2–0 victory over Bulgarian side CSKA Sofia and a 5–0 win against A.C. Milan. Had Milan beaten the Seasiders, they would have topped their group, with Blackpool not even finishing in second place.

Blackpool faced Lanerossi Vicenza once more in the semi-finals. The score was tied 1–1 at the end of normal time. To penalties it went, and the English side won 4–3. 'Pool keeper Colin King saved two of the five penalties he faced.

Napoli were Blackpool's opponents in the final. A double from Stuart Parker and one from David Tong gave the Tangerines a 3–1 victory. Blackpool had become the first English club to win the tournament.

Over the next two seasons, Blackpool goals were scarce, with only 38 and 40 scored, respectively. Final positions of 7th and 12th were also frowned upon by the board, and Potts left Bloomfield Road in May 1976.

Although there had been little on-field success, Potts had succeeded in the transfer market, buying frugally but effectively and selling star players for large profits. Micky Burns went to Newcastle United for £175,000, and goalkeeper John Burridge also left for Aston Villa for a large fee.

Allan Brown, another former Blackpool player, returned to manage the club for the 1976–77 season. He immediately made some shrewd signings, notably that of Bob Hatton, who teamed up with Mickey Walsh for an effective strike partnership. Also joining was Iain Hesford, another goalkeeper who went on to make his name at Bloomfield Road.

Blackpool finished fifth in Brown's first season – indeed if they had obtained two more points, they would have pipped Nottingham Forest for promotion to Division One. The team also seemed to have rediscovered their goalscoring touch, with Walsh netting 28 goals overall.

The 1977–78 season, however, proved to be one that the club would prefer to forget. From what seemed like a safe mid-table position in March, Blackpool won only one of their final 16 games and was relegated to Division Three, by one point, for the first time in their 91-year history. Brown had been sacked in February, with the club in 9th place and having scored 10 goals in their previous two home games, and it was left to Jimmy Meadows once more to pick up the pieces for the remaining 3 months of the campaign.

The reasons for Brown's departure were never fully disclosed, but it started a downward spiral that continued for many years; indeed, Blackpool went on to spend the next 29 years in the lower two divisions of the Football League.

The 1978 close season brought the death of 29-year-old player Alan Groves from a heart attack.

It was also at this time that several players left Bloomfield Road in their droves, including Mickey Walsh and Bob Hatton, who had scored 36 goals between them the previous season.

== A sharp decline ==
Jimmy Meadows, who had been given the caretaker manager role for a second time, was replaced in May 1978 by the returning Bob Stokoe as the club faced up to life in the Third Division. Despite the goals of Derek Spence, now in his second spell with the club after a season on Greek shores with Olympiacos, the team struggled to find their feet and could only finish mid-table, with attendances at Bloomfield Road lower than ever. At the end of the 1978–79 season, Stokoe walked out for a second time, never to return.

The club's crest for the first half of the 1980s.

Stan Ternent was installed as Blackpool manager a month into the 1979–80 season, and he also kept the club in mid-table safety, with the Tony Kellow–Derek Spence partnership looking strong. Ternent, however, was not given the chance to improve on his encouraging start. The Blackpool board had persuaded former player Alan Ball to return to the club as manager. So, in February 1980, five months into his tenure, Ternent was dismissed.

Ball returned to Bloomfield road "on a tide of enthusiasm from the Blackpool public", and he was treated like a returning messiah. His "Second Coming", however, proved to be overhyped. Blackpool finished eighteenth, and avoided relegation only in the final match, a 2–0 victory at Rotherham United.

Ball proceeded to spend a lot of money on new players who subsequently failed to live up to the reputations they had earned in the past. He also introduced a large batch of youngsters who were unable to cope with League football. At the end of the 1980–81 season, Blackpool was in the Fourth Division, the League's basement, for the first time. Ball had departed three months earlier, replaced by Allan Brown for his second stint in the Bloomfield Road hot seat. On 21 March 1981, Blackpool played their 3,000th match in the Football League. It occurred against Chesterfield at Saltergate.

Blackpool was now in serious financial difficulty. They had paid a club-record £132,400 for Jack Ashurst two years earlier and had not recouped any of that sum and attendances were at an all-time low. There was talk of Blackpool Borough Council stepping in to help, and also of a Manchester supermarket chain willing to buy the Bloomfield Road ground.

On the field, however, Blackpool adjusted well to Fourth Division football, finishing twelfth after leading the table for some time.

A tall striker by the name of Dave Bamber was making a name for himself, although by now both Tony Kellow and Derek Spence had moved on. The team also made it to the fourth round of the FA Cup for the first time in six seasons. In April, though, Brown's short second reign came to an end as pressures from above forced him to resign.

During the summer months, there was something of a "coup" in the boardroom, with the new set of directors promising stability and a more positive outlook. They began the search for an ambitious young manager, and found him in Sam Ellis.

Ellis was a Lancastrian who had been a successful player and was learning the management ropes under Graham Taylor at Watford. Ellis was introduced to Blackpool by Tom White

His first season, however, was not a success: Blackpool finished 21st – four places from the bottom of the entire Football League, the lowest finishing position in their history – and had to seek re-election, but it was all part of a rebuilding process introduced by the manager.

The club was also to be hit hard by hooliganism, which was rampant throughout English football at the time, with Blackpool's firm, then known as Benny's Mob, being one of the most notorious in the country.

As there was still a lack of transfer funds, Ellis scoured the youth teams and free-transfer market for his buys. He also made some money by selling Dave Bamber and Colin Morris for large fees, and Bamber's replacement, Paul Stewart, began to emerge as a goalscorer. At the end of the 1983–84 season, Blackpool had just missed out on promotion, finishing sixth. There had also been a successful FA Cup run, which saw the Tangerines beat Manchester City in the third round. They succumbed to Oxford United in the fourth, however.

The following season, with the assistance of new signings Ian Britton, Eamon O'Keefe and Mike Walsh, the team finished runners-up to Chesterfield and gained promotion to the Third Division.

Sam Ellis was treated as a folk-hero at Bloomfield Road, and many clubs were watching him closely as a result. A first-round FA Cup exit at the hands of non-League Altrincham, at Bloomfield Road, had been an early-season shock, however. The scene was recreated the following campaign, this time in the second round, with Altrincham again the victors.

Back in the third tier of English football, in the 1985–86 season, Blackpool finished twelfth. They had been in the top four up until Christmas, but an injury to O'Keefe set them back in the new year. For the former Port Vale forward, meanwhile, the injury all but ended his career.

Off the field, the club was facing large bills for the upkeep of the now-dilapidated Bloomfield Road stadium, with the supermarket chain looming threateningly. It seemed at one stage that the final home game of the season, against Newport County on 3 May 1986, would be the last time the team would be seen in the town, with talk of a move to Preston. After another power-struggle in the boardroom, the club survived.

In 1986–87 there were many player movements. Paul Stewart was sold to Manchester City for £200,000 in March. Prior to that, Mike Conroy and Ian Britton had departed. Alex Dyer went to Hull City, but a new defender, Steve Morgan, was emerging as a professional. Also, the once-prolific scorer Craig Madden joined from West Brom.

By February, Blackpool was well placed for an attempt at promotion, but after Stewart's departure, they faded away and finished ninth. Stewart finished as the club's top scorer for the campaign, even after his departure two months earlier, with 21 strikes.

Attendances dropped again, with only 1,902 witnessing the visit of Fulham on 7 April, a new and unwanted club record. The style of play implemented by Ellis was now under fire, and the pressure to bring more success was intensifying.

The club's crest between 1987 and 1993.

Blackpool attained 10th position in 1987–88, leaving themselves with a slim chance of making the new play-offs system; however, 4 defeats in their final 8 games meant that 10th was now their finishing position. On 8 March 1988, the club celebrated its centenary with a champagne reception and seven-course dinner – advertised as a "Centenary Banquet and Ball" – at the Imperial Hotel. Russell Harty was the guest speaker, exactly three months prior to his death.

The "discovery" of the season was that of Mark Taylor, who scored 23 goals overall. He suffered an injury in December of the following season, which kept him out of the remainder of that season and the whole of the next.

In the boardroom, local entrepreneur Owen Oyston was gaining a larger financial stake in the club. He was made chairman, succeeding Ken Chadwick, after a shareholder meeting on 31 May 1988.

Despite the arrivals of several new players, such as Andy Garner from Derby County and the added firepower of Tony Cunningham, in April 1989, Sam Ellis paid for failure with his job. The team were struggling near the foot of the table, and after a 4–2 home defeat by Reading, Ellis' contract was terminated by mutual consent.

By winning four of their last five games, Blackpool stayed up, but it had been a close call. There was little interest in the cups, apart from a two-legged victory over First Division Sheffield Wednesday in the League Cup.

Many new faces were brought in for the start of the 1989–90 campaign, including Carl Richards, Steve McIlhargey in goal, Gordon Owen and Gary Brook. The man who had signed them was Jimmy Mullen, a 37-year-old who had been given the job on a wave of public acclaim after he had helped the team to survival the previous season.

During pre-season, Blackpool partook in the Manx Cup, and they reached the final for the first time. After a goalless draw with Rochdale, a victory over Preston North End, and another scoreless match, this time against Bury, they faced Blackburn Rovers in the 15 August final at Bloomfield Road. Rovers won by a single goal, thanks to Andy Kennedy's header twenty minutes from time.

Mullen's tenure was brief. After spending thousands of pounds on players who subsequently failed to impress, and with the team heading for relegation once more, his contract was ended – less than eleven months after his appointment.

The club managed an FA Cup run to the fifth round, before going out after two replays against Queens Park Rangers, but in the League, Blackpool were indeed relegated to the Fourth Division. Mullen left with seven games to play, and former Blackpool player and director Tom White became caretaker manager for the remaining games. He was assisted by Billy Ayre, who eventually became the manager. The final match of the campaign was a 3–0 home loss to Bristol Rovers, who were managed by Gerry Francis. The result crowned the visitors as champions.

In June 1990, prior to Blackpool's 1990–91 season, Graham Carr was appointed manager after finding success at Northampton Town.

As a pre-season warm-up, the club took part in the Isle of Man Festival tournament, for which they became eligible when they finished as runners-up in the Lancashire Manx Cup the previous year. In its ninth year, Blackpool faced the Isle of Man at Castletown and won 3–1. They drew the next game, against Oxford United, 1–1, before losing the third/fourth place play-off against Stoke City. They also conducted a tour of the North East in late July, playing North Shields, Alnwick and Dunstan.

On 30 November, with the team in 18th position, Carr was sacked. His assistant, Billy Ayre, largely unknown outside the lower tiers, was put in charge for the following day's game at Hereford United and proceeded to transform the team.

With only one signing – the return of Dave Bamber on a permanent basis after a loan spell – Blackpool climbed the table, losing only five of their remaining thirty games. It was during this period that two new (and still existing) club records were set: fifteen consecutive home League wins in what turned out to be a 24-game unbeaten run at Bloomfield Road. The run stretched from November of the 1990–91 season to November of the following campaign. Ayre had instilled new confidence in the players, a belief that had been lacking for the past several years.

On 5 January 1991, Tottenham Hotspur visited Bloomfield Road for an FA Cup third-round tie. In Terry Venables' team that day were the England trio of Gary Mabbutt, Gary Lineker (who at that point had 61 caps to his name) and a 24-year-old Paul Gascoigne. The Londoners won by a single goal, scored by former 'Pool striker Paul Stewart. The £72,949 gate receipts from the game remains a club record.

== A Wembley double ==
As the 1990–91 season drew to a close, Blackpool were in the heart of the promotion battle. They went into the final game of the season, at Walsall, in second place, knowing that one point would be good enough for automatic promotion. In front of a large following, however, the players "froze" and were beaten 2–0. The play-offs beckoned, and after disposing of Scunthorpe United in the semi-finals, Blackpool could look forwards to their first Wembley appearance in 38 years. On 22 May 1991, after the second leg of the semi-final, the news came through that Stan Mortensen, one of the club's most famous players, had died at the age of 69.

Some 15,000 Blackpool fans travelled to London for the play-off final. The game went from end to end before finishing 2–2 after extra time. For the first time, penalties would decide promotion in the Football League.

In sudden death, Dave Bamber, whose 17 League goals had helped them get to that point in the season, put his spot-kick wide of Gareth Howells' left-hand post and Torquay United were promoted, while Blackpool faced another season in the League's basement division.

Despite the loss, Ayre was rewarded with a new contract and directorship at the club.

For 1991–92, Blackpool were the favourites for not only promotion but for the championship. Little money was spent on new players, but £400,000 was raised via the club-record sale of Alan Wright to Kenny Dalglish's Blackburn Rovers.

Blackpool began the campaign in a strong manner and was in the top four throughout. By the end of the season, the team had managed a run of 31 wins in 35 League games stretching back to the previous season. They were not as successful on their travels, however, winning only five times.

It was a case of déjà vu when Blackpool went into the final game of the season, at Lincoln City, needing a solitary point for promotion. Again, they buckled under the pressure and lost 2–0, and the play-offs would decide their immediate future once more.

Blackpool faced Barnet in the semi-finals and won 2–1 on aggregate over the two legs, meaning a visit to Wembley for the final for the second consecutive year. Their opponents were Scunthorpe United, whom Blackpool knocked out at the semi-finals stage twelve months earlier, finished five points behind them in the table.

On 23 May 1992, a red-hot Saturday afternoon in the English capital, some 13,000 tangerine-clad fans witnessed another end-to-end battle, with the final score being 1–1 after extra time. Yet again, penalties were needed. This time Blackpool was victorious, after Scunthorpe substitute, 21-year-old Jason White blasted his kick high over the crossbar of Steve McIlhargey, who had just saved Graham Alexander's effort. Blackpool was back in English football's third tier after a two-year absence.

== Managerial merry-go-round ==
Blackpool were founder members of the new Division Two at the start of the 1992–93 campaign, following the formation of the Premier League. They narrowly avoided relegation over the next two seasons.

On 16 January 1993, Blackpool hosted Rotherham United in a "Buy A Player" League match, a scheme by which money from gate receipts was given to the manager for spending in the transfer market. The crowd of 6,144 there that day paid for the purchase of Andy Watson.

On 1 May 1993, Blackpool's draw at Burnley saved them from relegation back to the League's basement division. Billy Ayre compared the escape to winning promotion the previous year. "This has to be a much bigger achievement, especially after the dreadful start we made," Ayre said at the time. "It has to be the biggest day of my managerial career."

Blackpool adopted this crest in 1993. The club's current crest, adopted in 1999, is a modified version of this one.

Prior to the start of the latter 1993–94 campaign, the club sold their tricky right-winger Trevor Sinclair to Q.P.R. for a then-club-record £600,000. During pre-season, Blackpool won the Lancashire Senior Cup, beating Manchester United by a single Bryan Griffiths goal at Bloomfield Road. It was Blackpool's first success in the competition since 1953. The visitors included an 18-year-old David Beckham in their line-up. Blackpool successfully defended their title over the next two campaigns.

The club held their annual general meeting on 16 September 1993, and commercial manager Geoff Warburton announced that the reports showed a loss of only £6,999 for the year. He announced: "We are now the envy of many clubs and have only recently had visits from a number of clubs, including Aberdeen and Tranmere Rovers, to look at the work we are doing. This alone is testimony that we are making good progress off the field."

At the end of the season, when the club survived relegation by virtue of a final-day victory at home to Leyton Orient, chairman Owen Oyston decided it was time for a change and sacked Ayre. His replacement, in July 1994, was Sam Allardyce. His assistant was Phil Brown, who had just finished his playing career with the Seasiders.

Tony Ellis joined Blackpool from arch-rivals Preston North End for £165,000 in the summer of 1994. At that point, Ellis had scored 94 League goals in 235 games for three clubs, including two spells at Preston.

In Allardyce's first season, 1994–95, Blackpool finished mid-table in Division Two and exited both cups at the first-round stage.

In 1995–96, Allardyce led the club to a third-placed finish. This was despite a Christmas period that saw a 4–0 defeat at York City on Boxing Day, a home setback against Stockport County, and a 7–1 loss at Birmingham City. A recovery was mounted, and after defeating Burnley 3–1 at Bloomfield Road on 12 March, Blackpool went top of the table, their highest position since 1978. Allardyce, however, was sacked after they lost to eventual play-off winners Bradford City in the semi-finals, despite winning the away first leg 2–0. "There was a feeling all around the club that we were there," explained Andy Preece 24 years later. "Even in the programme they put directions for Wembley. Bradford probably picked up on a lot of that."

On 22 May 1996, Owen Oyston was found guilty of raping a 16-year-old girl and received a six-year prison sentence. His wife, Vicki, who had been on the board since 1987, took over as chairman. Oyston was given an early release from prison in 1999.

Allardyce's successor was Gary Megson, and it was during Megson's short reign that Blackpool had a taste of the big time again when, during the 1996–97 campaign, Premier League side Chelsea, then managed by the ex-Dutch international Ruud Gullit, came to Bloomfield Road for a League Cup second round, first leg match on 18 September 1996. It was also the first time that a game featuring Blackpool was broadcast live on Sky Sports. Blackpool took the lead through James Quinn's first-minute strike, but the visitors won 4–1, with goals by Jody Morris, Dan Petrescu, Mark Hughes and John Spencer. Blackpool won the return leg at Stamford Bridge 3–1 (a double by Tony Ellis and one from Quinn), but Spencer's 63rd-minute goal edged the tie 5–4 on aggregate in the home side's favour.

Nigel Worthington was appointed manager for the 1997–98 season, replacing Stockport County-bound Megson. He took the club on a "dour" pre-season tour of his native Northern Ireland in late July and early August and was relieved of his position two years later with Blackpool heading for relegation to Division Three.

In December 1998, a Midlands-based leisure group was behind an £18 million bid for the club. Chairman Vicki Oyston met with representatives from the consortium to discuss a deal that would see her family relinquish their control of the club after almost eleven years. The bid was for the club and its Bloomfield Road site and was also designed to involve moving the club to a new stadium at Whyndyke Farm. Mrs. Oyston admitted that it was "fan power" that had driven her to try and sell the club. "I don't like bullies, but so-called fan power has cost the club a lot of money and made us question whether we should do all this on our own."

Gill Bridge, the club's managing director since December 1993, resigned from her position on 3 April 1999. On the same day, chairman Vicki Oyston officially stood down, with her son, Karl, taking over.

A week later, on 10 April, the club was awarded £552,000, which was to be spread over four years, by the Sport England Lottery Fund. The money was to be put towards the club's centre of excellence and youth-development programme. Trevor Brooking, the acting chairman of the English Sports Council, stated, "I hope the benefits will become increasingly evident with more young players achieving higher standards of performance. In the future, I'm sure you'll see players that have been helped to develop with your Lottery money playing for your team."

On 13 December 1999, Blackpool travelled to Arsenal in the third round of the FA Cup. In front of 34,143 at Highbury, the Gunners won 3–1, with goals from Gilles Grimandi, Tony Adams and Marc Overmars. Phil Clarkson had equalised Grimandi's 23rd-minute opener.

== Revival ==
Steve McMahon succeeded Worthington in early 2000, but he was unable to stop Blackpool from sliding into Division Three — Oldham Athletic's injury-time leveller in the penultimate league game of the season sealing their fate.

During the close season, a squad of sixteen players left for a week-long Caribbean trip to the island of Saint Kitts to play in an international tournament. Blackpool won the tournament, but it was decided that they would not be returning to defend their trophy the following summer, due to frustrations caused by flight delays, hotel problems, their kit being sent to Grenada, goats on the training pitch and the general laid-back approach to island life.

A return to Division Two, via the play-offs, was attained at the first attempt, and they were still in English football's third tier when McMahon resigned in 2004. They won the Football League Trophy twice in McMahon's final three seasons at the helm, with Blackpool statistically being the most successful football club at the Millennium Stadium. They hold a 100% record from their three visits between 2001 and 2006, when English finals were moved to Cardiff while Wembley was being rebuilt.

On 18 January 2003, Blackpool played their 4,000th match in the Football League. It occurred against Northampton Town at Bloomfield Road. (Note: the count does not include the three games played in 1939-40 before the Football League abandoned its schedule upon the outbreak of WWII.)

The second incarnation of the Bloomfield Road facade, pulled down in 2003 as a long-awaited redevelopment of the ground got underway.

McMahon's successor was former Scotland captain Colin Hendry, who lasted little over a year before being replaced by Simon Grayson. Grayson had previously briefly teamed up with Mike Flynn for the final game of the 2003–04 season, after McMahon's departure. With assistance from experienced coaches Tony Parkes and Asa Hartford, Grayson was able to guide the team to nineteenth place and safety in his first managerial role.

The club's owners, the Oyston family, announced in December 2005 that they were considering three bids for the club. In early May 2006, it appeared that Valērijs Belokoņs, a Latvian businessman with connections in both banking and beer, was poised to make a considerable investment, possibly even taking over the chairmanship from Karl Oyston. On 19 May 2006, it was announced that Belokon had agreed to invest £5 million into the club, which will be spread over several years.

On 29 June 2006, Belokon invested in Blackpool, purely on the playing side of the club, of which he now has a shareholding of 20%, with the option to double the stake at a later date. Belokon became the new president, and both he and his assistant, Normund Malnacs, became directors of the club. The team travelled to Latvia for a three-match tour in mid-July as part of their pre-season preparations.

Belokon has also bought a football club in Riga, Latvia, with the sole intention of its being a feeder club and providing players for Blackpool.

In the 2006–07 FA Cup Blackpool reached the fourth round for the first time in seventeen years, after beating Aldershot Town 4–2 at Bloomfield Road, but were knocked out by Norwich City, 3–2 after a replay at Carrow Road. They finished the League in third place, and qualified for the play-offs, and as top scorers in League One with 76 goals. After beating Oldham Athletic 5–2 on aggregate in the semi-final they met Yeovil Town in the final at the new Wembley Stadium, their first appearance at England's national stadium in fifteen years. Blackpool won 2–0, a club-record tenth consecutive victory, and were promoted to The Championship in their 100th overall season in the Football League.

Blackpool knocked Premier League side Derby County out of the League Cup at the second-round stage on 28 August 2007. The match ended 1–1 after ninety minutes and 2–2 after extra time. The Seasiders won the resulting penalty shootout 7–6. On 25 September, Blackpool beat Southend United 2–1 after extra time to reach the fourth round for the first time in 35 years. They were drawn away to Premiership side Tottenham Hotspur in the last sixteen, a match they lost 2–0. Tottenham went on to win the competition.

Blackpool finished the 2007–08 season in 19th place, escaping relegation by two points and ensuring their safety in a 1–1 draw with Watford on the final day of The Championship season.

On 23 December 2008, Simon Grayson left the club to join League One club Leeds United after just over three years in charge at Bloomfield Road. Under the guidance of Grayson's assistant, Tony Parkes, in a caretaker manager capacity, Blackpool finished the 2008–09 campaign in 16th place. Parkes left the club on 18 May 2009 after a meeting with chairman Karl Oyston about finances.

On 21 May 2009, Ian Holloway was appointed as manager, signing a one-year contract with the club. On 31 July it was announced that club president Valeri Belokon was setting up a new transfer fund, into which he was adding a "considerable amount" on 5 August in order to invest in new players identified by Holloway. Four days later Blackpool broke their transfer record by signing Charlie Adam from Scottish champions Rangers for £500,000, eclipsing the £275,000 paid to Millwall for Chris Malkin in 1996.

Blackpool finished the 2009–10 regular season in sixth place in The Championship, their highest finish in the Football League since 1970–71, (Note: Blackpool finished the 1973–74 and 1976–77 seasons in fifth place in Division 2. However, there were then 22 teams in the first tier, rather than 20 as at present, and only the top two in Division 2 were promoted) and claimed a spot in the play-offs. On 2 May 2010, the 57th anniversary of Blackpool's FA Cup Final victory, Blackpool hosted Bristol City for the final League game of the season. They needed to match or better Swansea City's result in their match at home to Doncaster Rovers. Both matches ended in draws, with Swansea's Lee Trundle having a late goal disallowed for handball, which meant Blackpool secured the remaining play-off place.

On 8 May, Blackpool beat Nottingham Forest 2–1 at Bloomfield Road in the semi-final first leg. Three days later, they beat them 4–3 (6–4 on aggregate) at the City Ground in the second leg to progress to the final (their third in ten seasons) against Cardiff. The result meant Blackpool had beaten Forest in all four of the clubs' meetings in 2009–10.

Blackpool defeated Cardiff City 3–2 on 22 May in the Championship play-off final at Wembley Stadium to earn promotion to the Premier League. It was to be Blackpool's first appearance in the Premier League since the 1992 founding of the competition and their first appearance in English football's top flight in 39 years. Blackpool had now, uniquely, been promoted through all three tiers of the Football League via the play-off system.

On 24 May, a Promotion Parade was held along Blackpool's promenade for the club's personnel, who travelled on an open-top double decker bus from Gynn Square down the Golden Mile to the Waterloo Headland. The police estimated that about 100,000 people lined the route. At the Headland, manager and squad took to a stage to address the gathered mass crowd. "This is the most unbelievable moment of my life," said Ian Holloway. "I've jumped on the best ride of my life and I don't want to go home."

== Back in the top flight ==
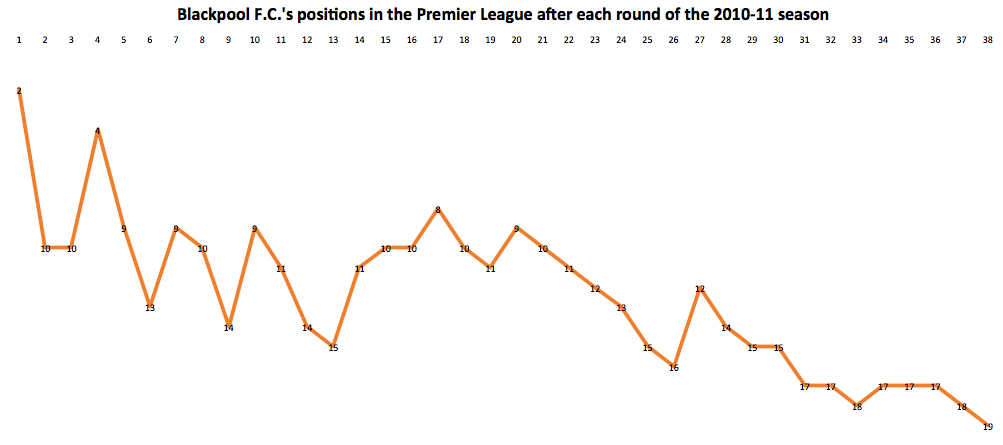
Blackpool F.C.'s positions in the Premier League after each round of the 2010–11 season.

In their first-ever Premier League match, Blackpool defeated Wigan Athletic 4–0 at the DW Stadium. The result saw the Seasiders sit atop the table until Chelsea's 6–0 victory over West Bromwich Albion later in the day. It was the first time they had been in such a position since they won their opening game of the 1957–58 top-flight campaign. The initial fixture list had the game being played at Bloomfield Road, but the Premier League permitted the switching of the game to Wigan because construction work on Bloomfield Road's East Stand had not been completed in time.

On 27 January 2011, the Premier League fined Blackpool £25,000 for fielding what they believed to be a weakened team against Aston Villa on 10 November. Ian Holloway, who initially threatened to resign if punishment was dealt, made ten changes to the team for the fixture. The club had fourteen days to appeal the decision, but chose not to, with Karl Oyston stating that if the fine was upheld there was a threat of a point deduction and an increase in the fine.

On 22 May 2011, exactly 365 days after their promotion, Blackpool were relegated back to The Championship, after losing 4–2 at champions Manchester United, coupled with results elsewhere, on the final day of the season.

== Another decline ==
After making an unsuccessful bid to return to the Premier League at the first attempt – West Ham beat them in the play-off final – Ian Holloway opted to resign just three months into the 2012–13 campaign to take the vacant managerial post at Crystal Palace. He had been in charge of Blackpool for 105 Football League and 38 Premier League games, of which he had won 54.

Steve Thompson took temporary charge while a successor to Holloway was found. Michael Appleton was installed four days later, after agreeing to leave Portsmouth. Thompson was kept on as joint-assistant manager with Ashley Westwood. Appleton resigned after two months to become the new manager of Blackburn Rovers in the wake of Steve Kean's departure, become Blackpool's shortest-serving manager in their history. (Appleton was out of work again 67 days later after he was sacked from the Ewood Park hotseat.)

Steve Thompson again stepped in to take on a caretaker manager role – a stint that lasted just over a month. Former Manchester United and England captain Paul Ince was named as Blackpool's third manager of the season on 18 February 2013. His son, Tom, was a member of the playing squad.

It was under Ince that Blackpool made their best-ever start to a League season. Their victory at Bournemouth on 14 September 2013 gave them sixteen points out of a possible eighteen. The sequence of results was two wins, a draw, and three wins. This was countered by a run of nine defeats in ten games, which resulted in Ince being sacked on 21 January 2014, eleven months into his tenure. Assistant managers Alex Rae and Steve Thompson were also given their marching orders. Then-club captain Barry Ferguson was appointed caretaker manager until the end of the campaign, but the club could muster only three further victories in the remaining twenty games. They finished 20th, avoiding relegation by two points. Tom Ince remained the club's top goalscorer, with seven goals, despite having gone on loan to Crystal Palace after his father's dismissal just over three months earlier.

On 11 June 2014, Belgian José Riga became Blackpool's first overseas manager. He had previously been in charge at Charlton Athletic. With the club having been bottom of the table since the opening weeks of the campaign, Riga was relieved of his duties four-and-a-half months later, with former Huddersfield Town and Birmingham City manager Lee Clark replacing him. He was Blackpool's eighth manager under Karl Oyston, and the fourth full-time appointment in two years. Clark resigned shortly after the conclusion of the 2014–15 season after Blackpool were relegated to the third tier for the first time in eight years.

Neil McDonald was installed as their new manager during the summer of 2015. He oversaw Blackpool's relegation to the bottom tier for the first time in fifteen years at the end of his only season in charge.

Gary Bowyer was installed as McDonald's successor on 1 June 2016, becoming Blackpool's eighth manager in three-and-a-half years. Bowyer guided the Seasiders back to the third tier in his first season. They beat Exeter City in the League Two play-off final, and became the most successful side in English play-off history, with five promotions to their name.

In November 2017, Blackpool was put up for sale by the Oyston family. Gary Bowyer resigned at the start of the 2018–19 campaign and was replaced by his assistant, Terry McPhillips.

On 2 February 2018, Owen Oyston relieved his son, Karl, of his role as chairman and appointed his daughter, Natalie Christopher, in his place.

The following February, the football club was put into receivership by the High Court. Owen Oyston was removed from the board by the receiver later that month.

== Life after the Oystons ==
On 13 June 2019, 49-year-old local businessman Simon Sadler was announced as the club's new owner, ending the Oystons' 32-year tenure.

On 5 July 2019, Terry McPhillips resigned as Blackpool's manager. He was succeeded by Simon Grayson, who returned to the role eleven years after leaving for Leeds United. He was sacked in February, six months into the season, and replaced by Neil Critchley, who became the club's 38th full-time manager in its 132-year history.

At the end of the following campaign, Critchley's first full season in charge, Blackpool were promoted back to the second tier of English football, after a six-year absence, after winning the 2021 EFL League One play-off final. It was Blackpool's sixth victory in a play-off final in eight such appearances.

On 2 June 2022, Neil Critchley resigned from his role as head coach and joined Aston Villa as assistant head coach. Just over two weeks later, the club appointed its former manager Michael Appleton as Critchley's successor. Critchley told Simon Sadler he was keen to work again with Steven Gerrard and "pit himself against some of the best coaches in the world". Appleton was sacked seven months later, on 18 January 2023, after the club managed one win in eleven games. Veteran Mick McCarthy was appointed to oversee the rest of the season, but an Easter Monday defeat at home to fellow strugglers Cardiff City ended his spell in charge. Interim manager, former Seasiders striker Stephen Dobbie, could not keep them in the division. Blackpool were relegated to League One after a home defeat to Millwall on 28 April 2023.

Neil Critchley returned for a second spell as manager in the summer, and the following 2023–24 season saw an eighth-placed finish in League One, two places outside the play-off positions. Critchley was sacked in August 2024 with Blackpool still in League One. He was succeeded by Steve Bruce. After achieving a ninth-placed finish in the 2024–25 season, Bruce was sacked as head coach on 4 October 2025 with the club second-bottom of League One. Former Blackpool captain Ian Evatt was appointed as Bruce's replacement on 21 October. He became the club's fourteenth full-time manager in thirteen years.
