= Dave Hockaday =

English footballer & manager (born 1957)

David Hockaday
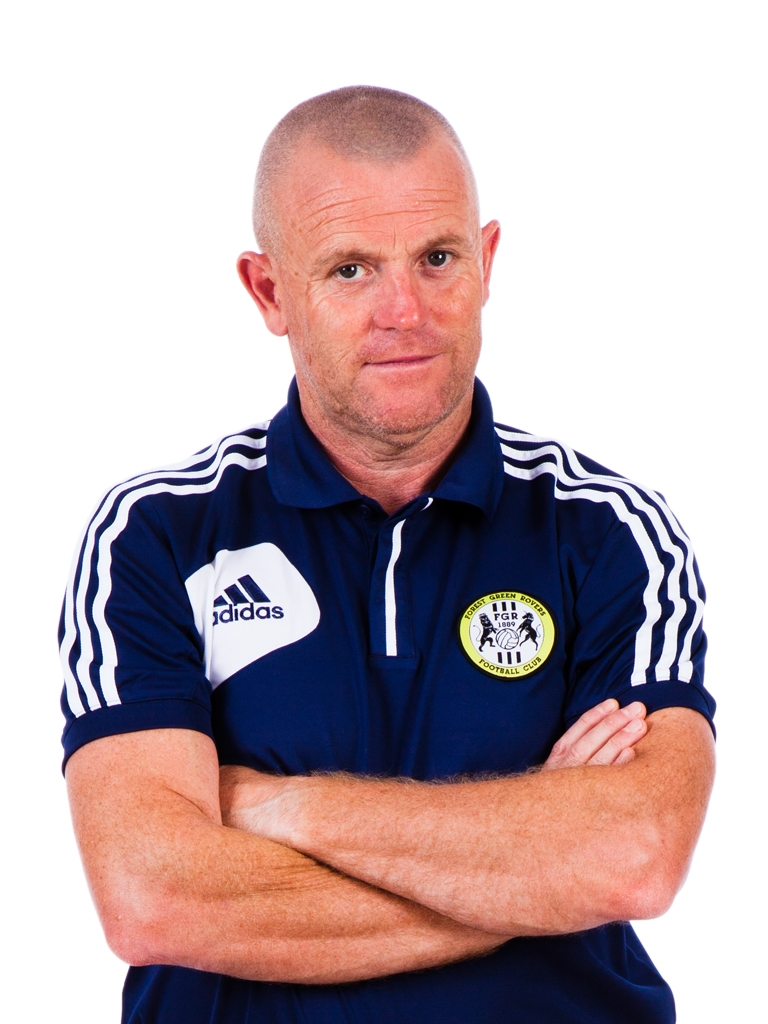
- Hockaday as manager of Forest Green Rovers

Personal information
- Full name: David Hockaday
- Date of birth: 9 November 1957 (age 69)
- Place of birth: Sedgefield, England
- Positions: Winger; right-back

Youth career
- Billingham Synthonia

Senior career*
Years	Team	Apps	(Gls)
1975–1983	Blackpool	147	(24)
1983–1990	Swindon Town	245	(7)
1990–1993	Hull City	72	(2)
1993	→ Stoke City (loan)	7	(0)
1993–1995	Shrewsbury Town	48	(0)
1995	Cirencester Town		
Total		519	(33)

Managerial career
- 2009–2013: Forest Green Rovers
- 2014: Leeds United
- 2015: Coventry City (caretaker)
- 2015–2016: Kidderminster Harriers
- * Club domestic league appearances and goals

David Hockaday (born 9 November 1957) is an English professional footballer who is Head of Male Football at South Gloucestershire and Stroud College. He has previously worked as a manager at Leeds United, Forest Green Rovers, Kidderminster Harriers and in a caretaker capacity at Coventry City.

A former professional footballer, Hockaday played for Blackpool, Hull City, Shrewsbury Town, Stoke City and Swindon Town. as a right-back. After his playing career ended he helped establish a football academy at Cirencester, as well as spending time as first team coach at Watford and as youth team coach at Southampton. He also spent four years as manager of Conference Premier side Forest Green Rovers.

In June 2014, Hockaday became the new head coach of Leeds United. On 28 August 2014, his contract was terminated by the owner of Leeds. During February 2015, Hockaday also had a short spell as caretaker manager of Coventry City. In October 2015, it was announced Hockaday would take over as head coach at National League side Kidderminster Harriers.

== Playing career ==
=== Blackpool ===
Hockaday was born in Sedgefield, County Durham. He started his career as a youth player with Billingham Synthonia. In June 1975, aged 17, he joined Blackpool, then playing in the Second Division. He made his first start for the Tangerines on 25 September 1976, in a 1–0 home loss to Chelsea. Aside from a League Cup second-round tie against Sheffield Wednesday, he sat out the entire 1977–78 campaign, but the following season he became a more regular first-team player as Blackpool slid down the leagues. He scored his first goal for the club in a 3–1 loss at Colchester United on 30 September 1978, and, later that season, scored both goals in Blackpool's 2–1 victory at Lincoln City.

Also on 30 September, this time in 1981, Hockaday was amongst the scorers in Blackpool's 7–1 rout of Halifax Town at Bloomfield Road. In his final season in Lancashire, he made 40 league appearances and scored eight goals, but was unable to prevent Blackpool from finishing fourth from bottom and needing to seek re-election. In his eight seasons at Blackpool he made over 190 first-team appearances, scoring 27 goals.

=== Swindon Town ===
In June 1983, he moved on a free transfer to fellow Fourth Division side Swindon Town. He was a solid, dependable right-back and was part of the team managed by Lou Macari that gained the Fourth Division championship in the 1985–86 season, following this with promotion to Division Two in 1986–87. In 1988–89 Swindon reached the Second Division play-offs but failed in their attempt to gain promotion to the top flight. In 1989–90 Swindon won the Second Division play-off final but Sunderland were promoted instead after the Swindon board admitted a series of financial irregularities. Swindon were initially demoted to the Third Division and replaced by Tranmere Rovers, the division's losing play-off finalists, but this decision was later reversed on appeal. In September 1990, Hockaday moved to Hull City for a fee of £50,000 having made 308 appearances for Swindon, with 11 goals.

=== Later career ===
At Hull City he was part of the side which suffered relegation from the Second Division at the end of the 1990–91 season. He played 15 times for Hull the following season and spent the end of the 1992–93 campaign on loan at Stoke City where he played seven times helping the Potters win the Second Division title. After a third season at Hull he moved on to Shrewsbury Town. He was a member of the Shrewsbury team who won the Third Division title at the end of his first season, before he dropped out of league football, moving to Cirencester Town in 1995.

== Coaching career ==
In 1996, Hockaday established one of the first football academies in the country at Cirencester, following the Thorp Arch model that Howard Wilkinson started at Leeds United in 1994. The Cirencester Football Academy was created in conjunction with the local Sixth Form College. The academy team soon built up a nationwide reputation by winning the National College Championship. In 2000, he joined Graham Taylor at Watford as the club's Under 18 coach. As Under 18 coach at Watford, Hockaday helped develop the careers of players such as Paul Robinson, Hamer Bouazza, Tommy Smith, Darren Ward, Ashley Young and Alhassan Bangura. In 2005, he was promoted to first-team coach and assisted the Hornets as the club won promotion to the Premier League in 2006.

In January 2007, as Watford struggled to avoid relegation, he was sacked by manager Adrian Boothroyd. In March 2007 he joined Martin Allen at Milton Keynes Dons until the end of the season, where the team reached the League Two play-offs. In May 2007, Martin Allen moved to Leicester City and on 6 June it was announced that Hockaday would be joining the Leicester City coaching staff.

On 19 June 2007, it was announced that he would be joining Southampton as youth team coach replacing Georges Prost, he was put on gardening leave by the club in January 2009 and was released from his contract in May of the same year. Hockaday again linked up with Martin Allen at his new club Cheltenham Town for a very short period on a non-contract basis however left the club when John Schofield was appointed as the club's assistant manager in March 2009.

== Managerial career ==
=== Forest Green Rovers ===
In September 2009 Hockaday became the first team manager at Forest Green Rovers. The job was the first time he had been appointed to a managerial position. He led Forest Green Rovers to the third round of the FA Cup in his debut season as a manager after overcoming Bath City in the second round. Rovers were knocked out in the third round however by League Two outfit Notts County meaning Forest Green missed out on the chance to face Premier League opposition in the shape of Wigan Athletic.

His first season as manager ended with relegation from the Conference Premier. However, Forest Green were reinstated following Salisbury City's failure in their appeal against demotion from the Conference for financial irregularities. Despite the team finishing in a relegation position and coming under fire from a number of the club's fans, Hockaday was offered a new one-year contract for the 2010–11 season. In his second season as Forest Green boss the team narrowly avoided relegation to the Conference South the team lost their final day fixture, a 2–1 loss away at Tamworth, but stayed in the league on goal difference.

In his third season as Forest Green manager the club finished the season in 10th place. Hockaday's fourth season as manager of the club again ended with another 10th-place finish in the Conference Premier despite reportedly having the largest transfer and wage budget in the division. In February 2013, Hockaday dismissed rumours linking him with the vacant managerial post at former club Swindon Town after the departure of Paolo Di Canio.

After a disappointing start to the 2013–14 season, and after a run which saw Forest Green suffer seven defeats in eight games, Hockaday left the club by mutual consent on 21 October 2013.

=== Leeds United ===
On 19 June 2014, Hockaday was appointed as head coach of Leeds United on a two-year contract. Junior Lewis was hired as Hockaday's assistant. The appointment was both a surprise and a great disappointment to a large majority of Leeds United fans. Hockaday was widely ridiculed on social media and became known as "The Hock", partly due to the pronouncements of a fake Twitter account set up in his name. His annual salary was reported as being about £90,000, compared to the £750,000 paid to his predecessor Brian McDermott.

Hockaday took his team to Italy for a two-week training camp, and his first pre-season game as head coach resulted in a 16–0 victory against Italian amateur minnows FC Gherdeina. After the sixteenth goal had been scored, United's new goalkeeper Marco Silvestri was allowed to switch sides and play for the amateur team until the end of the game. A second match in Italy was planned but failed to take place because the opposition did not show up. After returning to England, Leeds played several friendlies against lower league opposition, starting with a 2–0 win over local side Guiseley (who play in the sixth tier of English football) on 19 July, with goals coming from Matt Smith and Jason Pearce. The final game of pre-season resulted in a creditable win over Scottish Premiership side Dundee United at Elland Road. Hockaday referred to his team as a "work in progress", praised his players for "putting a shift in" and said that they were improving with every game.

However, Leeds lost their first game of the new season 2–0, away at Millwall on 9 August. Hockaday's first and only league victory was against Middlesbrough at Elland Road on 16 August, with new striker Billy Sharp scoring a late winner on his debut.

Two more defeats followed, 2–0 against Brighton and 4–1 against Watford – a game which Leeds finished with nine men. After the Watford game, Leeds United's owner Massimo Cellino was reported to have made up his mind to sack Hockaday, but then had a change of heart, deciding to blame himself for the club's poor start to the season. But Hockaday's reprieve did not last long. On 27 August 2014, Leeds were knocked out of the League Cup by League One side Bradford City. Leeds had to play most of the game with ten men after a red card was shown to Luke Murphy, who became the fourth Leeds player to be sent off in Hockaday's first six games in charge (the others being Gaetano Berardi in the previous round of the Cup against Accrington Stanley, and Giuseppe Bellusci and Sam Byram against Watford).

On 28 August 2014, Hockaday and assistant Lewis were sacked by Cellino, having been in the job for only 70 days.

=== Swindon Supermarine ===
In November 2014, he was appointed to an advisory role at non-league side Swindon Supermarine. Later that month, he took on the role of assistant manager at Swindon Supermarine on a temporary basis, with club director Jez Webb describing Hockaday's appointment as "humbling."

=== Coventry City ===
Following his temporary role with Swindon Supermarine, Football League One side Coventry City announced on 2 February 2015 that Hockaday had been appointed professional development coach for the rest of the 2014–15 season. Manager Steven Pressley said that Hockaday would be working with the first team in addition to his duties coaching the Under-21s.

On 23 February following the departure of Steven Pressley, Hockaday took on the role of joint caretaker manager with Neil MacFarlane. They were in charge of two games, a 2–1 victory over Milton Keynes Dons and a 1–0 defeat at Barnsley. On 3 March 2015, Tony Mowbray was appointed manager of Coventry City on a deal until the end of the 2014–15 season.

=== Kidderminster Harriers ===
In October 2015, National League side Kidderminster Harriers announced Hockaday had been appointed as new head coach. He guided them to their first league win in 22 games, when they beat Woking 1–0 on 31 October 2015. Hockaday was sacked on 7 January 2016 with the Harriers bottom of the league having won only two games in charge of the team.

After leaving Kidderminster he opened his own football academy for young footballers based in Wiltshire. In October 2016, he was appointed the new head of male football at South Gloucestershire and Stroud College.

== Career statistics ==
Appearances and goals by club, season and competition
Club	Season	League			FA Cup		League Cup		Other^{[A]}		Total	
Club	Season	Division	Apps	Goals	Apps	Goals	Apps	Goals	Apps	Goals	Apps	Goals
Blackpool	1976–77	Second Division	5	0	0	0	2	0	2	0	9	0
Blackpool	1977–78	Second Division	0	0	0	0	1	0	0	0	1	0
Blackpool	1978–79	Third Division	18	4	1	0	5	0	3	0	27	4
Blackpool	1979–80	Third Division	7	1	2	0	1	0	3	0	13	1
Blackpool	1980–81	Third Division	36	4	2	2	4	0	4	1	46	7
Blackpool	1981–82	Fourth Division	41	7	5	0	2	0	1	0	49	7
Blackpool	1982–83	Fourth Division	40	8	2	0	5	0	0	0	47	8
Blackpool	Total		147	24	12	2	20	0	13	1	192	27
Swindon Town	1983–84	Fourth Division	36	3	5	0	2	1	3	0	46	4
Swindon Town	1984–85	Fourth Division	22	1	1	0	1	0	0	0	24	1
Swindon Town	1985–86	Fourth Division	37	1	2	0	4	1	2	1	45	3
Swindon Town	1986–87	Third Division	40	2	4	0	4	0	9	0	57	2
Swindon Town	1987–88	Second Division	43	0	3	0	4	0	5	1	55	1
Swindon Town	1988–89	Second Division	44	0	4	0	2	0	3	0	53	0
Swindon Town	1989–90	Second Division	20	0	1	0	4	0	0	0	25	0
Swindon Town	1990–91	Second Division	3	0	0	0	0	0	0	0	3	0
Swindon Town	Total		245	7	20	0	24	2	22	2	311	11
Hull City	1990–91	Second Division	35	1	0	0	2	0	0	0	37	1
Hull City	1991–92	Third Division	12	0	1	0	0	0	2	0	15	0
Hull City	1992–93	Second Division	25	1	2	0	2	1	2	0	31	2
Hull City	Total		72	2	3	0	4	1	4	0	83	3
Stoke City (loan)	1992–93	Second Division	7	0	0	0	0	0	0	0	7	0
Shrewsbury Town	1993–94	Third Division	32	0	3	0	4	0	1	0	40	0
Shrewsbury Town	1994–95	Second Division	16	0	1	0	2	0	2	0	21	0
Shrewsbury Town	Total		48	0	4	0	6	0	3	0	61	0
Career total			519	33	39	2	54	3	42	3	654	41

A. The "Other" column constitutes appearances and goals in the Anglo-Scottish Cup, Football League Group Cup, Football League Trophy, Football League play-offs and Full Members Cup.

== Managerial statistics ==
As of 7 January 2016. Forest Green League Managerial Record confirmed by Sky Sports Yearbook

Managerial record by team and tenure
Team	From	To	Record				
Team	From	To	P	W	D	L	Win %
Forest Green Rovers	9 September 2009	21 October 2013	206	70	53	83	34.0
Leeds United	19 June 2014	28 August 2014	6	2	0	4	33.3
Coventry City (caretaker)	23 February 2015	3 March 2015	2	1	0	1	50.0
Kidderminster Harriers	9 October 2015	7 January 2016	13	2	1	10	15.4
Total			227	75	54	98	33.0

== Honours ==
Swindon Town

- Football League Third Division play-offs: 1987
- Football League Fourth Division: 1985–86

Stoke City

- Football League Second Division: 1992–93

Shrewsbury Town

- Football League Third Division: 1993–94
