= Max Thompson (footballer, born 1956) =

English footballer (1956–2023)

Personal information
- Full name: Maxwell Stuart Thompson
- Date of birth: 31 December 1956
- Place of birth: Liverpool, England
- Date of death: 27 June 2023 (aged 66)
- Height: 6 ft 1 in (1.85 m)
- Position: Central defender

Youth career
- Liverpool

Senior career*
| Years | Team | Apps | (Gls) |
| 1973–1977 | Liverpool | 1 | (0) |
| 1977–1981 | Blackpool | 99 | (7) |
| 1977 | → Dallas Tornado (loan) | 21 | (2) |
| 1978 | → Dallas Tornado (loan) | 22 | (2) |
| 1980 | → Seattle Sounders (loan) | 5 | (0) |
| 1981–1983 | Swansea City | 26 | (2) |
| 1983 | AFC Bournemouth | 9 | (0) |
| 1983 | → Port Vale (loan) | 2 | (0) |
| 1983–1985 | Baltimore Blast | 39 | (6) |
| 1985–1986 | Académica de Coimbra | | |
| 1986 | Northwich Victoria | | |
| 1987 | Caernarfon Town | | |
| 1988 | Fleetwood | | |
| 1988–1989 | Newport County | 15 | (1) |
| 1989 | Kramfors | | |
| 1989–1992 | Southport | 7 | (0) |
| Total | | 246+ | (20+) |

Managerial career
- Knowsley United
- * Club domestic league appearances and goals

Maxwell Stuart Thompson (31 December 1956 – 27 June 2023) was an English footballer. A central defender, he scored eight goals in 137 league games in a ten-year career in the Football League. At age 17 years and 128 days, he became Liverpool's youngest-ever player (his record has since been broken) when he made his debut in May 1974. He joined Blackpool three years later, and went on to play 99 league games for the club in four years, and was also loaned out to the Dallas Tornado and Seattle Sounders. He then spent the 1980s with various clubs across the world: AFC Bournemouth, Port Vale, Baltimore Blast (USA), Académica de Coimbra (Portugal), Northwich Victoria, Caernarfon Town, Fleetwood, Newport County, Kramfors (Sweden), and Southport. He later worked at Anfield as a physiotherapist.

== Career ==
Thompson started his career with Liverpool and broke the club record for being the youngest player to appear for Liverpool when Bill Shankly handed him his First Division debut at the end of the 1973–74 season against Tottenham Hotspur on 8 May 1974, at the age of 17 years and 128 days. His record was broken by Jack Robinson, who made his debut for Liverpool at the age of 16. Thompson was on the substitutes bench at Wembley in the 1974 FA Charity Shield victory over Leeds United. He never made it onto the pitch though for another league appearance under Bob Paisley in the 1974–75, 1975–76, and 1976–77 campaigns.

Thompson was sold to Allan Brown's Blackpool for a £80,000 fee in December 1977. The "Tangerines" were relegated out of the Second Division at the end of the 1977–78 season. New boss Bob Stokoe took them to 12th in the Third Division in 1978–79, before they ended the 1979–80 season in 18th place under Alan Ball's stewardship. The club in turmoil, Allan Brown returned to the hot seat and took them down to the Fourth Division in 1980–81. Thompson scored six goals in 99 league games during his time at Bloomfield Road. During his time at the club he also spent the 1977 and 1978 summers in the North American Soccer League with Dallas Tornado, and also spent the summer of 1980 with the Seattle Sounders.

Thompson signed with Swansea City, and helped John Toshack's "Swans" defy expectations with a sixth-place finish in the top-flight in 1981–82. However, they did suffer relegation at the end of the 1982–83 campaign. Thompson scored twice in 26 league games at Vetch Field. He then played nine Third Division games for AFC Bournemouth in a brief stay at Dean Court. He joined John McGrath's Port Vale on loan in November 1983, but played just two Third Division games for the "Valiants".

Thompson later played for American Major Indoor Soccer League side Baltimore Blast, Portuguese Académica de Coimbra, Conference club Northwich Victoria, Northern Premier League side Caernarfon Town, Fleetwood, Newport County, Swedish Kramfors, and Southport.

== Later life ==
Thompson became the manager of Knowsley United before becoming the physiotherapist at Liverpool and then Southport.

Thompson died on 27 June 2023, at the age of 66.

== Career statistics ==
Appearances and goals by club, season and competition
| Club | Season | League | | | FA Cup | | Other | | Total | |
| Club | Season | Division | Apps | Goals | Apps | Goals | Apps | Goals | Apps | Goals |
|---|---|---|---|---|---|---|---|---|---|---|
| Liverpool | 1973–74 | First Division | 1 | 0 | 0 | 0 | 0 | 0 | 1 | 0 |
| Liverpool | 1974–75 | First Division | 0 | 0 | 0 | 0 | 0 | 0 | 0 | 0 |
| Liverpool | 1975–76 | First Division | 0 | 0 | 0 | 0 | 1 | 0 | 1 | 0 |
| Liverpool | 1976–77 | First Division | 0 | 0 | 0 | 0 | 0 | 0 | 0 | 0 |
| Liverpool | Total | | 1 | 0 | 0 | 0 | 1 | 0 | 2 | 0 |
| Blackpool | 1977–78 | Second Division | 12 | 0 | 0 | 0 | 0 | 0 | 12 | 0 |
| Blackpool | 1978–79 | Third Division | 39 | 2 | 1 | 0 | 3 | 0 | 43 | 2 |
| Blackpool | 1979–80 | Third Division | 24 | 0 | 1 | 0 | 7 | 0 | 32 | 0 |
| Blackpool | 1980–81 | Third Division | 24 | 5 | 1 | 0 | 1 | 1 | 26 | 6 |
| Blackpool | 1981–82 | Fourth Division | 0 | 0 | 0 | 0 | 0 | 0 | 0 | 0 |
| Blackpool | Total | | 99 | 7 | 3 | 0 | 11 | 1 | 113 | 8 |
| Dallas Tornado (loan) | 1977 | NASL | 21 | 2 | — | | — | | 21 | 2 |
| Dallas Tornado (loan) | 1978 | NASL | 22 | 2 | — | | — | | 22 | 2 |
| Seattle Sounders (loan) | 1980 | NASL | 5 | 0 | — | | — | | 5 | 0 |
| Swansea City | 1981–82 | First Division | 23 | 1 | 1 | 0 | 1 | 0 | 25 | 1 |
| Swansea City | 1982–83 | First Division | 3 | 1 | 0 | 0 | 3 | 0 | 6 | 1 |
| Swansea City | Total | | 26 | 2 | 1 | 0 | 4 | 0 | 31 | 2 |
| AFC Bournemouth | 1983–84 | Third Division | 9 | 0 | 0 | 0 | 2 | 0 | 11 | 0 |
| Port Vale (loan) | 1983–84 | Third Division | 2 | 0 | 0 | 0 | 0 | 0 | 2 | 0 |
| Baltimore Blast | 1983–84 | MISL | 4 | 2 | — | | — | | 4 | 2 |
| Baltimore Blast | 1984–85 | MISL | 35 | 4 | — | | — | | 35 | 4 |
| Baltimore Blast | Total | | 39 | 6 | 0 | 0 | 0 | 0 | 39 | 6 |
| Newport County | 1989–90 | Football Conference | 15 | 1 | 0 | 0 | 0 | 0 | 15 | 1 |
| Southport | 1989–90 | Northern Premier League | 7 | 0 | 3 | 0 | 1 | 0 | 11 | 0 |
| Southport | 1991–92 | Northern Premier League | 0 | 0 | 0 | 0 | 3 | 0 | 3 | 0 |
| Southport | Total | | 7 | 0 | 3 | 0 | 4 | 0 | 14 | 0 |
| Career total | | | 246 | 20 | 7 | 0 | 22 | 1 | 275 | 21 |

== Honours ==
Liverpool

- FA Charity Shield: 1974
