= Terry Pashley =

English footballer (born 1956)

Personal information
- Full name: Terence Pashley
- Date of birth: 11 October 1956 (age 70)
- Place of birth: Chesterfield, England
- Height: 5 ft 8 in (1.73 m)
- Position: Defender

Youth career
- 1972–1973: Burnley

Senior career*
Years	Team	Apps	(Gls)
1973–1978	Burnley	18	(0)
1978–1983	Blackpool	201	(7)
1983–1990	Bury	217	(5)
Total		436	(12)

International career
1972	England Schoolboys	8	(0)

Managerial career
- 2007: Burnley (caretaker)
- 2010: Burnley (caretaker)
- 2012: Burnley (caretaker)
- * Club domestic league appearances and goals

Terence Pashley (born 11 October 1956) is an English former professional footballer. He played for Burnley, Blackpool and Bury in the 1970s and 1980s, making well over 400 Football League appearances for the three clubs. His position was as a defender, specifically a left full-back. He now works as a coach for Burnley, with the club confirming on 16 October 2012 that he has taken on the role of caretaker manager (following the departure of Eddie Howe to Bournemouth).

== Playing career ==
Pashley's career started when he was promoted from the youth team to the first-team squad by then Football League First Division side Burnley in 1972. He made his professional début on 18 September 1973, in an Anglo-Scottish Cup tie against East Fife at Turf Moor. He went on to play a total of 20 games for the Clarets over the following six seasons, making 18 league appearances in that time. His last game for Burnley came in the 1–2 defeat to Cardiff City on 19 November 1977.

Pashley signed for Bob Stokoe's Blackpool in 1978. He made his debut for the club in the third league game of the 1978–79 season, a 2–1 defeat at Rotherham United on 26 August. He went on to make 34 further league appearances, as well as two in the FA Cup and three in the League Cup.

He appeared in fifty of Blackpool's 52 league and cup games of 1979–80 (under Stan Ternent firstly, then Alan Ball), scoring three goals (all in the league). His first goal occurred in the opening league game of the season, a 2–1 victory over Gillingham at Bloomfield Road on 18 August. The other two came in a 5–4 home victory over Brentford on 13 October, and in a 2–1 defeat against the same opposition in the reverse fixture.

In 1980–81, Pashley made thirty league appearances, again under two managers – this time Alan Ball and his successor, Allan Brown.

Pashley was ever-present in Allan Brown's first full season in charge, 1981–82, appearing in each of the club's 53 league and cup games. He scored one league goal, in a 3–2 defeat at Aldershot on 17 October.

Brown left the club at the end of the season, and was replaced by Sam Ellis. Pashley was ever-present for the second consecutive season. His 53 appearances in 1982–83 meant he had made 106 consecutive appearances for Blackpool. This was, however, a long way short of Georgie Mee's record of 195 consecutive league appearances for the club. Pashley spent a large portion of the season up front alongside Dave Bamber, and scored three league goals (two from the penalty spot). He also helped put Blackpool into the second round of the FA Cup by scoring in their first-round victory at Horwich R.M.I. He also scored two goals in the League Cup.

Pashley left Blackpool for Bury at the end of the season. He remained at Gigg Lane for six years, making 217 League appearances and scoring five League goals.

== Managerial career ==
After retiring from playing, Pashley remained in Lancashire and became U18s Manager at Burnley. After former manager Owen Coyle, and other senior backroom staff left for Bolton, Pashley was made joint caretaker manager of the club with Martin Dobson. He held the same position when Eddie Howe left the club prior to Sean Dyche being appointed but this time solely. In his 3 games in charge of the Burnley senior team, Pashley guided the team to a 1–0 home victory over his local side Blackpool (only Burnleys 2nd clean sheet of the season) and a 4–3 victory away to Bristol City, where a 96th-minute goal from Chris McCann was enough to secure victory. However Terry lost his last game to an inform Cardiff City, who were top of the league at this time, by four goals to nil. Since his arrival at Burnley F.C., as part of the back-room staff, he has quickly made his way up the popularity scale with wins against Manchester United U18s with Burnley U18s and Fulham U18s with the same side.

=== Managerial statistics ===
As of 27 October 2012

Team	Nat	From	To	Record				
Team	Nat	From	To	G	W	D	L	Win %
Burnley (caretaker)	(England)	16 October 2012	30 October 2012	3	2	0	1	66.67
