= Paul Gardner (footballer) =

English footballer (born 1957)

Personal information
- Full name: Paul Anthony Gardner
- Date of birth: 22 September 1957 (age 69)
- Place of birth: Southport, England
- Height: 5 ft 9 in (1.75 m)
- Position: Right-back

Senior career*
Years	Team	Apps	(Gls)
1976–1982	Blackpool	152	(1)
1982–1984	Bury	90	(0)
1984	Swansea City	4	(0)
1984–1985	Wigan Athletic	5	(0)
Total		251	(1)
- * Club domestic league appearances and goals

Paul Anthony Gardner (born 22 September 1957 in Southport) is an English former professional footballer. He played as a right-back.

Gardner began his career with Allan Brown's Blackpool in 1976. He made his League debut for the club on 25 September, in a single-goal defeat at Chelsea, thus becoming Blackpool's first Black player. He went on to make a further 21 starts as Blackpool finished fifth in Division Two at the end of the 1976–77 campaign. He also played in the club's three games (two replays) against Arsenal in the third round of the League Cup. He had made his first appearance for the club in the initial tie on 21 September. After the third replay, Allan Brown said of Gardner: "The boy has had hard matches every game he has played: three against Arsenal and against Chelsea and Bolton Wanderers. He has responded superbly."

In 1977–78, Gardner made 31 league appearances as Blackpool finished 20th and were relegated to Division Three.

Under new manager Bob Stokoe, Gardner made 23 appearances during the 1978–79 campaign, and 40 the following season, 1979–80, under Stan Ternent, firstly, then Alan Ball.

In 1980–81, Gardner scored his first and only goal of his career. It came in a 4–2 defeat to Sheffield United at Bramall Lane on 16 September 1980.

Allan Brown, who signed Gardner for Blackpool, returned as manager during the 1980–81 season, but in 1981–82 he gave only twelve starts to the defender. At the end of the season, after just over 150 league games for the Seasiders, he was sold to Bury.

Gardner spent two years at Gigg Lane, making almost a century of league appearances for the club. In 1984, he had a short spell with Swansea City, and then finished his career with Wigan Athletic.
