= Stan McEwan =

Scottish footballer (born 1957)

Personal information
- Full name: Stanley McEwan
- Date of birth: 8 June 1957 (age 69)
- Place of birth: Newmains, Scotland
- Position: Defender

Senior career*
Years	Team	Apps	(Gls)
1974–1982	Blackpool	213	(24)
1982–1984	Exeter City	65	(15)
1984–1988	Hull City	113	(25)
1988–1989	Wigan Athletic	29	(4)
1989–1990	Hartlepool United	14	(2)
1989–1990	Boston United	16	(2)
Total		450	(72)
- * Club domestic league appearances and goals

Stanley McEwan (born 8 June 1957) is a Scottish former professional footballer. He spent eight years at Blackpool in the 1970s and 1980s, making over 200 Football League appearances for the club. He also played for four other professional clubs in his career. His position was as a defender.

== Career ==
=== Blackpool ===
Newmains-born McEwan made his debut for Harry Potts' Blackpool midway through the 1975–76 season, in a single-goal victory over Leyton Orient at Bloomfield Road on 12 December 1975. He went on to make sixteen further appearances in the league that season, as well as two in the FA Cup.

In 1976–77, under new manager, compatriot Allan Brown, McEwan made eleven league appearances; however, the following season, 1977–78, he was given an extended run in the team, making 39 league appearances. He also scored his first goal for the club, in a 2–2 draw at Crystal Palace on 25 April.

McEwan was ever-present in Blackpool's 53 league and cup games in 1978–79, under Bob Stokoe, his third manager in his time at the club. He scored five league goals (four from the penalty spot), including two in a 5–0 home victory over Shrewsbury Town on 20 March. He also scored one penalty in the FA Cup and two goals (one a penalty) in the League Cup.

Stan Ternent replaced Stokoe for the start of the 1979–80 campaign. He made 25 league appearances before Ternent was sacked. Former 'Pool player Alan Ball was installed as Ternent's successor, and McEwan went on to make a further fourteen appearances during the remainder of the league calendar. He scored twelve goals, including five penalties. His two goals gave Blackpool victory in a Lancashire derby with Blackburn Rovers at Bloomfield Road on 22 September, and his penalty at Reading on 26 April was the only goal of the game. In addition, he scored two cup goals, one in each competition, which put him at the top of the club's overall goalscoring chart for the season.

McEwan made 24 league appearances under Ball during 1980–81. Ball was fired in the New Year, and was replaced by Allan Brown for his second stint in charge during McEwan's Blackpool career. Ball had omitted McEwan from the team for his final eight games in charge, but Brown reinstated him to the line-up for his first game back in the hot seat and the subsequent eleven games leading up to Blackpool's relegation to Division Four.

In McEwan's final season at the seaside, 1981–82, saw him make 25 league appearances. His final appearance for the club occurred on 27 March, in a 2–2 draw with Peterborough United at Bloomfield Road.

=== After Blackpool ===
McEwan left Blackpool in March 1982 to join Exeter City. He made 65 league appearances in two years for the Grecians, scoring fifteen goals. In 1984, he joined Hull City, and went on to make 113 league appearances for the club, scoring 25 goals. Four years later, he signed for Wigan Athletic. He made 29 league appearances for the Latics and scored four goals. He rounded off his professional career with an equally-brief spell with Hartlepool United in 1989, making fourteen league appearances and finding the net on two occasions.

McEwan moved into non-League football with Boston United in 1990.

== Honours ==
Hull City

- Associate Members' Cup runner-up: 1983–84
