= Jimmy Weston =

English footballer

Personal information
- Full name: James John Weston
- Date of birth: 16 September 1955 (age 71)
- Place of birth: Prescot, St Helens, Lancashire
- Height: 5 ft 9 in (1.75 m)
- Position: Midfielder

Senior career*
Years	Team	Apps	(Gls)
19??–1974	Skelmersdale United		
1974–1980	Blackpool	105	(8)
1980–1981	Torquay United	38	(1)
1981–1983	Wigan Athletic	66	(2)
1983–19??	Morecambe		
- * Club domestic league appearances and goals

James John Weston (born 16 September 1955) is an English former professional footballer. He spent five years at Blackpool in the early 1970s and 1980s, making over one hundred Football League appearances for the club. He also played for two other Football League clubs, namely Torquay United and Wigan Athletic. He played as a midfielder.

== Blackpool ==
Signed from Skelmersdale United in January 1974, Weston made his debut for Harry Potts' Blackpool midway through the 1975–76 season, as a substitute in a single-goal victory over Notts County at Bloomfield Road on 29 November. He went on to make a further ten league appearances that campaign, scoring once — in a 1–1 home draw with Fulham on 20 December. He also appeared in both of the club's FA Cup ties.

In 1976–77, under new manager Allan Brown, Weston made nine league appearances and one League Cup appearance (the latter in the first of two third-round replays against Arsenal on 28 September).

Weston made nineteen league appearances in 1977–78, the majority prior to Allan Brown's departure. Brown was replaced, as caretaker manager, by Jimmy Meadows. Meadows gave only three starts to Weston before the end of the season, at which point Blackpool were relegated to Division Three.

Bob Stokoe was installed as Blackpool's new manager prior to the 1978–79 season, his second time in the role. Weston made 31 league appearances that season, scoring four goals.

Stan Ternent replaced Bob Stokoe in the Blackpool hot seat during the close season, and in the following 1979–80 campaign, Weston made 35 league appearances and scored three goals. Alan Ball succeeded Ternent two-thirds of the way through the season, making it six managers Weston had played under in five years at the club.

Weston made his final appearance for Blackpool in the final league game of the 1979–80 season, a 2–0 victory at Rotherham United on 6 May.

== Later career ==
Weston left Blackpool to join Torquay United in June 1980, making his league debut in a 1–0 win at home to Crewe Alexandra on 16 August, the opening day of the season. He played 35 times in the league that season, also playing both games in the League Cup and in all four games as Torquay reached the third round of the FA Cup. He started the first two games of the following season before losing his place, initially to Maurice Cox. He played once more before moving back to the north-west of England in September 1981, when he joined Wigan Athletic. He was Wigan's Player of the Year for the 1982–83 season, but returned to non-League football with Morecambe in 1983.
