= Derek Spence =

Northern Irish footballer

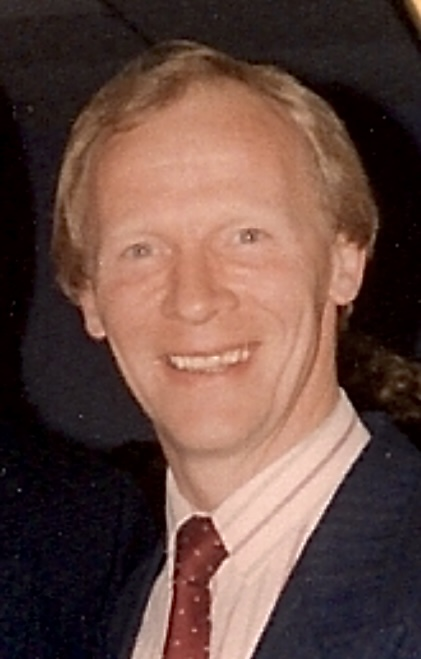
- Derek Spence in 1994

Personal information
- Full name: Derek William Spence
- Date of birth: 18 January 1952 (age 74)
- Place of birth: Belfast, Northern Ireland
- Position: Forward

Senior career*
Years	Team	Apps	(Gls)
1969–1971	Crusaders		
1971–1972	Oldham Athletic	6	(0)
1972–1976	Bury	140	(44)
1976–1978	Blackpool	27	(3)
1978	Olympiacos	21	(6)
1978–1980	Blackpool	58	(18)
1980–1982	Southend United	103	(32)
1982	Sparta Rotterdam		
1982	Sea Bee		
1982–1983	Hong Kong Rangers		
1983–1984	Bury	13	(1)
Total		348+	(98+)

International career
1975–1982	Northern Ireland	29	(3)
- * Club domestic league appearances and goals

Derek William Spence (born 18 January 1952) is a Northern Irish former professional footballer. He played as a forward in a career spanning seventeen years from 1969 to 1986.

He played for clubs in Northern Ireland, England, Greece, the Netherlands and Hong Kong. He also played for Northern Ireland.

== Club career ==
Belfast-born Spence started his career with Irish League club Crusaders in 1969, before making the short trip to England in 1971 to join Fourth Division side Oldham Athletic, signing his contract in a local pub to earn £18 a week. He spent three years in the Oldham reserves at Boundary Park. He went on to make just six league appearances for the Latics, before joining Bury in 1972. It was at Gigg Lane that he spent the majority of his thirteen-year career and scored the most league goals – 44 in 140 league games.

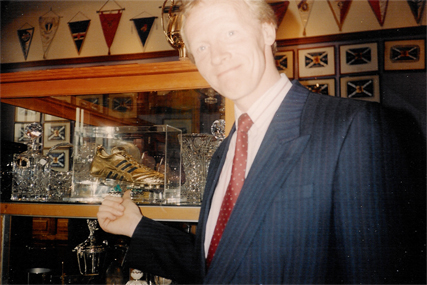
Spence posing with Ally McCoist's Golden Boot inside Rangers' trophy room at Ibrox Stadium in 1994

In 1976, Spence joined Second Division side Blackpool, and made his debut for the Seasiders against Brian Clough's Nottingham Forest on 16 October. He complemented the twin striking powers of Mickey Walsh and fellow new signing Bob Hatton. However, at the end of the season he found his place under threat from Stan McEwan.

A serious injury kept Spence out of the entire 1977–78 campaign, which ended with Blackpool's relegation to the Third Division for the first time in their history.

Spence then joined Greek Alpha Ethniki club Olympiacos, where he made 21 league appearances, scoring six goals. He then returned to Blackpool, who were then playing in the Third Division, for a fee of £27,000 and joined forces with Tony Kellow, who had signed from Exeter City. Between them, they scored 27 goals in the 1978–79 season, nearly half of the team's total, with Spence top scorer on sixteen goals. Speaking about his return to Lancashire, he said "I made quite a lot of money from my time in Greece, but being there put me in the international wilderness. From being a regular in the squad, I became an outcast. So, despite the crowd being fantastic and the players who loved me, I moved back to England." He nearly did not rejoin, however. "I had basically agreed terms with Arthur Cox at Chesterfield when Bob Stokoe rang me. He invited me back to Blackpool and, to be honest, I jumped at the chance. Needless to say, Arthur wasn't too happy."

On 26 December 1979, in a game against Hull City at Bloomfield Road, Spence suffered an injury serious enough that it eventually forced his premature retirement from the game. In 1980, he moved to Fourth Division side Southend United, helping them to win promotion in the 1980–81 season as champions. He scored 32 goals in 104 games over a two-year period.

Between 1982 and 1986, Spence spent spells with Dutch club Sparta Rotterdam and Hong Kong clubs Sea Bee and Hong Kong Rangers (playing alongside international teammate George Best) before finishing his professional career with a second spell at Bury in 1986. He retired in 1986 at the age of 34 and eventually retired in Non-League football with Oldham Town in the North West Counties Football League.

== International career ==
Spence won his first Northern Ireland cap on 16 March 1975, in a single-goal victory over Yugoslavia in Belfast. He went on to win 29 caps in total, scoring three goals. His most notable appearance occurred on 13 October 1976, when he came on as a late substitute and scored a late equaliser against the Netherlands in a World Cup qualifying game in Rotterdam.

He ended his international career after discovering, via Teletext, that Billy Bingham had left him out of the 1982 World Cup squad.

== Post-football career ==
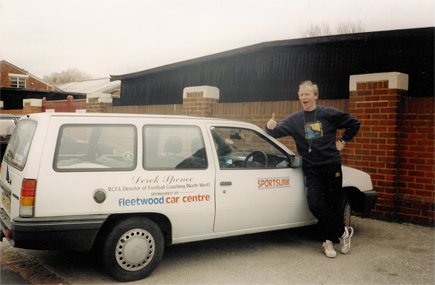
Spence, posing with his Sportslink car in 1994.

Spence ran his own off-licences in Walmersley, Bury, Greater Manchester, firstly, and then in Hambleton, Lancashire. He eventually returned to his first love of football by setting up his own coaching school, Sportslink. Then in 1996 he returned to Blackpool F.C. as the club's Football in the Community Officer, succeeding fellow ex-Tangerine and Shaker Craig Madden, a role he fulfilled until 2016, when he retired.

== Personal life ==
Born in Belfast in 1952, Spence was one of seven children. In 1970, at the age of 18, he had the option of staying in Northern Ireland and practise his trade as a joiner, or leave to try his fortunes in England. With terrorism rife in his homeland, he asked his father for advice. "He said, 'Well, if I were you, son, I'd get out.'"

Spence is married to Lyn, with whom he has two children, Thomas and Erin. He also has two children, Leanna and Matthew, from his first marriage.

== Honours ==
Southend United

- Football League Fourth Division: 1980–81

== Autobiography ==
Spence released a book about the early part of his life and playing career in 2019. The title, From the Troubles to the Tower, references the troubles in Northern Ireland and Blackpool Tower.
