= Gary Williams (footballer, born 1959) =

English footballer

Personal information
- Date of birth: 14 May 1959 (age 67)
- Place of birth: Birkenhead, England

Senior career*
Years	Team	Apps	(Gls)
1976–1977	Tranmere Rovers	1	(0)
1977–1980	Djurgården	41	(0)
1980–1981	Blackpool	31	(2)
1981–1982	Swindon Town	38	(3)
1982–1989	Tranmere Rovers	174	(16)
1985	→ Djurgården (loan)	22	(2)
1986	→ Djurgården (loan)	14	(1)
1989–	Morecambe		
- * Club domestic league appearances and goals

Gary Williams (born 14 May 1959) is an English former professional footballer.

== Career ==
=== Blackpool ===
Williams signed for Alan Ball's Blackpool in the summer of 1980. He started the first 26 League games of the 1980–81 season, before falling out of the team in favour of Terry Pashley.

Allan Brown succeeded Ball in March, with Blackpool heading for relegation, and Brown eventually sold Williams to Swindon Town.

=== Tranmere Rovers ===
Whilst in his second spell at Tranmere Rovers, he scored the goal that kept Tranmere in the Football League. In a 1–0 win against Exeter City, 8 May 1987, the last game of the 1986/87 season, a headed goal in the 84th minute from an Ian Muir cross in front of Tranmere's biggest home crowd for many years (6,983), thus ensuring Tranmere's survival against relegation into the then GM Vauxhall Conference, a fate which was to land on Lincoln City.
