= Dave Bamber =

English footballer

Personal information
- Full name: John David Bamber
- Date of birth: 1 February 1959 (age 67)
- Place of birth: Prescot, England
- Height: 6 ft 3 in (1.91 m)
- Position: Forward

Senior career*
Years	Team	Apps	(Gls)
1979–1983	Blackpool	81	(29)
1983–1984	Coventry City	19	(3)
1984	Walsall	20	(7)
1984	Portsmouth	4	(1)
1985	Trelleborgs FF	4	(1)
1985–1987	Swindon Town	108	(31)
1988	Watford	18	(3)
1988–1989	Stoke City	43	(8)
1989–1990	Hull City	28	(5)
1990	→ Blackpool (loan)	5	(4)
1990–1994	Blackpool	108	(56)
Total		438	(148)
- * Club domestic league appearances and goals

John David Bamber (born 1 February 1959) is an English former professional footballer. He played for nine clubs during a fifteen-year career. Over half of his 148 goals in the Football League were scored during his three spells with Blackpool.

== Career ==
Born in Prescot, Lancashire, Bamber played for Leicester University and St. Helens Town in youth and junior football. Bamber began his professional career at Blackpool in 1979. His starting debut came on 29 December 1979, in a loss at Chester City. He scored his first goal for the Seasiders on 7 April 1980, in a league encounter against Carlisle United at Bloomfield Road. During the next four years of struggle, Bamber scored 36 goals in 100 games in all competitions under four different managers. Coventry City came in for his services prior to the 1983–84 season. Bamber moved to Walsall in 1984, before a short stay at Portsmouth in 1984.

In 1985, he joined Swedish side Trelleborgs FF, making just four league appearances, scoring one goal, before moving back to England to play for Swindon Town later that same year. In two years with the Robins he made 108 league appearances, scoring 31 goals.

In 1988, he joined Watford with whom he made 18 league appearances and scored three goals before moving to Stoke City later that same year. In 1989, he joined Hull City, before returning to Blackpool in 1990 to bring his fifteen-year playing career to a close. He was re-signed by the Seasiders initially on loan, in December 1990, by the departing Graham Carr, who was immediately replaced by his assistant, Billy Ayre. "I signed for Graham Carr on the Thursday and got on the coach to go down to Hereford to find out that he'd been sacked," Bamber explained in 2012. "Nobody seemed to know what was going on. Billy Ayre got on the coach further down the M6." A month later, on 5 January 1991, shortly before kick-off in an FA Cup match against Tottenham Hotspur, new Seasiders manager Billy Ayre agreed to pay Hull £50,000 for Bamber, although Bamber claims it was half that amount.

In his second spell at Blackpool, Bamber played at Wembley twice in successive seasons (1990–91 and 1991–92), both in the play-off finals, and both of which went to penalty shoot-outs. In the first final, against Torquay United, Bamber put his spot-kick wide of Gareth Howells' left-hand post, handing promotion to the Tangerines' south-coast opponents. Following this loss, the Gulls named their fanzine Bamber's Right Foot, in mockery of the striker's miss.

The following year, however, Blackpool were victorious in the same manner against Scunthorpe United and were promoted to the new Division Two. Bamber, who played despite needing an operation on his knee (preserving his record of being an ever-present throughout the season), scored Blackpool's normal-time goal. He did not partake in the penalty shoot-out. A persistent pelvic injury forced Bamber to retire in 1994. Blackpool's owner Owen Oyston shortlisted Bamber as a candidate to replace Billy Ayre as manager the same year, but Sam Allardyce was ultimately selected.

== Blackpool F.C. Hall of Fame ==
Bamber was inducted into the Hall of Fame at Bloomfield Road, when it was officially opened by former Blackpool player Jimmy Armfield in April 2006. Organised by the Blackpool Supporters Association, Blackpool fans around the world voted on their all-time heroes. Five players from each decade are inducted; Bamber is in the 1990s.

== Personal life ==
Bamber is married to Joanne and has two daughters and a son.

== Post-retirement ==
After retiring from football, Bamber remained in Blackpool, becoming a property developer.

== Career statistics ==
Club	Season	League			FA Cup		League Cup		Other^{[A]}		Total	
Club	Season	Division	Apps	Goals	Apps	Goals	Apps	Goals	Apps	Goals	Apps	Goals
Blackpool	1979–80	Third Division	7	1	1	0	0	0	0	0	8	1
Blackpool	1980–81	Third Division	15	3	0	0	0	0	2	1	17	4
Blackpool	1981–82	Fourth Division	38	15	5	1	2	1	3	0	48	17
Blackpool	1982–83	Fourth Division	26	10	2	1	4	4	0	0	32	15
Blackpool	Total		81	29	8	2	6	5	5	1	100	37
Coventry City	1983–84	First Division	19	3	1	0	2	1	0	0	22	4
Walsall	1983–84	Third Division	10	3	0	0	0	0	0	0	10	3
Walsall	1984–85	Third Division	10	4	0	0	3	0	0	0	13	4
Walsall	Total		20	7	0	0	3	0	0	0	23	7
Portsmouth	1983–84	Second Division	4	1	0	0	0	0	0	0	4	1
Trelleborgs FF	1985	Allsvenskan	4	1	0	0	0	0	0	0	4	1
Swindon Town	1985–86	Fourth Division	23	9	0	0	1	0	0	0	24	9
Swindon Town	1986–87	Third Division	42	9	3	3	3	4	10	4	58	20
Swindon Town	1987–88	Second Division	41	13	3	2	6	3	5	0	55	18
Swindon Town	Total		106	31	6	5	10	7	15	4	137	47
Watford	1988–89	Second Division	18	3	0	0	2	1	2	0	22	4
Stoke City	1988–89	Second Division	23	6	3	2	0	0	0	0	26	8
Stoke City	1989–90	Second Division	20	2	0	0	2	0	1	1	23	3
Stoke City	Total		43	8	3	2	2	0	1	1	49	11
Hull City	1989–90	Second Division	19	3	0	0	0	0	0	0	19	3
Hull City	1990–91	Second Division	9	2	0	0	2	0	0	0	11	2
Hull City	Total		28	5	0	0	2	0	0	0	30	5
Blackpool	1990–91	Fourth Division	23	17	1	0	0	0	4	0	28	17
Blackpool	1991–92	Fourth Division	42	26	2	1	4	6	5	2	53	35
Blackpool	1992–93	Second Division	24	13	0	0	0	0	1	0	25	13
Blackpool	1993–94	Second Division	22	4	0	0	3	3	1	0	26	7
Blackpool	1994–95	Second Division	2	0	0	0	2	0	0	0	4	0
Blackpool	Total		113	60	3	1	9	9	11	2	136	72
Career Total			436	148	21	10	36	23	34	8	527	189

A. The "Other" column constitutes appearances and goals in the Anglo-Scottish Cup, Football League Group Cup, Football League play-offs, Football League Trophy and Full Members Cup.

== Honours ==
Swindon Town

- Football League Fourth Division: 1985–86
- Football League Third Division play-offs: 1987

Blackpool

- Football League Fourth Division play-offs: 1992

Individual

- PFA Team of the Year: 1991–92 Fourth Division
