= Paul Gardner =

Paul Gardner may refer to:

- Paul Gardner (writer), American writer and filmmaker
- Paul Gardner (journalist) (born 1930), American soccer journalist and author
- Paul Gardner (ice hockey) (born 1956), Canadian ice hockey player
- Paul Gardner (football administrator), Melbourne Football Club president
- Paul Gardner (Minnesota politician) (born 1967), member of the Minnesota House of Representatives
- Paul Gardner (footballer) (born 1957), English footballer (soccer player)
- Paul Gardner (priest) (born 1950), Christian priest and author
- Paul Fisher Gardner (1930–2020), American diplomat

== See also ==
- Paul Gardiner (1958–1984), British musician
- Paul Garner (disambiguation)
