= List of Blackpool F.C. records and statistics =

This page details Blackpool Football Club's all-time records.

== Club records ==
=== Results ===
- Largest victory: 10–0 (v. Lanerossi Vicenza, Anglo-Italian Cup on 10 June 1972)
- Largest defeat: 1–10 (v. Small Heath, Division Two, on 2 March 1901 and v. Huddersfield Town, Division One, on 13 December 1930)
- Consecutive victories: 12 (between 31 March 2007 and 14 August 2007)
- Consecutive defeats: 8 (between 26 November 1898 and 7 January 1899 and between 28 November 1964 and 16 January 1965)

=== League finishing positions ===
A graph displaying Blackpool's finishing positions in the English Football League from 1896 to the present.

- Highest: 2nd in Division One (1956)
- Lowest: 21st in Division Four (1983)

=== Transfer fees ===
- Largest transfer fee paid: £1,250,000 (DJ Campbell, to Leicester City, 2010)
- Largest transfer fee received: £6,750,000 (Charlie Adam, from Liverpool, 2011)

==== Record transfer-fee progression ====
===== Paid =====
Player	From	Fee	Year
Jock Dodds	Sheffield United	£10,000	1939
Alan Suddick	Newcastle United	£63,000	1966
Tony Kellow	Exeter City	£125,000	1978
Jack Ashurst	Sunderland	£132,400	1979
Andy Morrison	Blackburn Rovers	£245,000	1994
Chris Malkin	Millwall	£275,000	1996
Charlie Adam	Rangers	£500,000	2009
DJ Campbell	Leicester City	£1,250,000	2010

===== Received =====
Player	To	Fee	Year
Joe Lane	Birmingham City	£3,600	1920
Alan Ball	Everton	£112,000	1966
Tony Green	Newcastle United	£150,000	1971
Micky Burns	Newcastle United	£166,000	1974
Paul Stewart	Manchester City	£200,000	1987
Alan Wright	Blackburn Rovers	£400,000	1991
Trevor Sinclair	Q.P.R.	£600,000	1993
Brett Ormerod	Southampton	£1,750,000	2001
Charlie Adam	Liverpool	£6,750,000	2011

== Individual records ==
=== Players ===
- Most Football League appearances: Jimmy Armfield (569; between 27 December 1954 and 1 May 1971)
- Most consecutive League appearances: Georgie Mee (195; between 25 December 1920 and 12 September 1925)
- Most goals in total: Jimmy Hampson (252; between 15 October 1927 and 8 January 1938)
- Most Football League goals: Jimmy Hampson (248)
- Most League goals in one season: Jimmy Hampson (45; in 1929–30)
- Most goals in one game: 5 (Jimmy Hampson; v. Reading on 10 November 1928 and Jimmy McIntosh; v. Preston North End on 1 May 1948)
- Fastest goal: 11 seconds (Bill Slater; v. Stoke City on 10 December 1949 and James Quinn; v. Bristol City on 12 August 1995
- Most capped player: Jimmy Armfield (43; for England)

=== Managers ===
- Longest-serving manager: Joe Smith (22 years, 9 months; from 1 August 1935 to 30 April 1958)

== Personal honours ==
=== Ballon d'Or ===
The following players have won the Ballon d'Or while playing for Blackpool:

- Stanley Matthews – 1956

=== FWA Footballer of the Year ===
The following players have won the FWA Footballer of the Year award while playing for Blackpool:

- Stanley Matthews – 1947–48
- Harry Johnston – 1950–51

== Attendances ==
- Largest attendance – Pre-2002: 38,098; v. Wolverhampton Wanderers on 17 September 1955.
- Largest attendance – 2002 onwards: 16,116 (99.48% of capacity; v. Manchester City on 17 October 2010)

=== Home gate receipts ===
- Highest: £72,949 (v. Tottenham Hotspur, FA Cup third round, 5 January 1991)
