= History of Blackpool F.C. =

The history of Blackpool Football Club is described in two separate articles:

- History of Blackpool F.C. (1887–1962)
- History of Blackpool F.C. (1962–present)

For a general overview of the club's history, see Blackpool F.C.#History
