= 1974 FA Charity Shield =

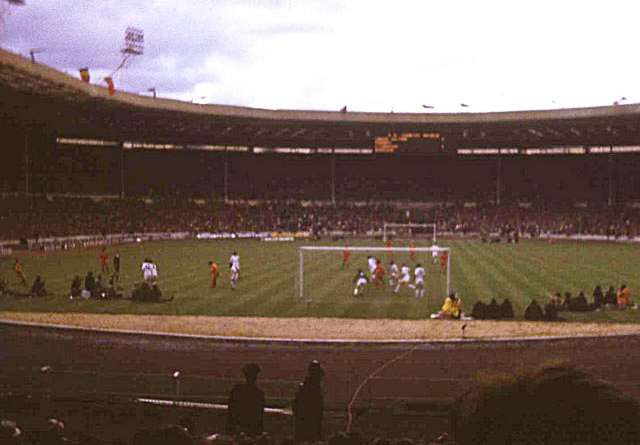
- Event: FA Charity Shield
| Liverpool | Leeds United |
| 1 | 1 |
- Liverpool won 6–5 on penalties
- Date: 10 August 1974
- Venue: Wembley Stadium, London
- Referee: Bob Matthewson
- Attendance: 67,000

The 1974 FA Charity Shield was the 52nd FA Charity Shield, an annual English association football match played between the winners of the previous season's Football League First Division and FA Cup. The match was contested by Leeds United, the champions of the 1973–74 Football League First Division, and Liverpool, the 1973–74 FA Cup winners. It was held at Wembley Stadium on Saturday, 10 August 1974. Watched by a crowd of 67,000, the match ended in a 1–1 draw and was decided by a penalty shoot-out which was won 6–5 by Liverpool.

The game was the first in which Bob Paisley and Brian Clough managed Liverpool and Leeds respectively. In recognition of his services to the club, Liverpool asked their recently retired manager Bill Shankly to lead the team out onto the field.

The match is mostly remembered for Billy Bremner and Kevin Keegan being jointly dismissed from the field by referee Bob Matthewson in the 60th minute after they had a fight. Keegan, who claimed provocation, was furious about being sent off, and threw his shirt away. Bremner copied him, and the two players were afterwards charged with bringing football into disrepute. The FA Disciplinary Committee imposed tough punishments, but were themselves heavily criticised by people in football who doubted their competence.

== Background and pre-match ==
The FA Charity Shield was founded in 1908 as a successor to the Sheriff of London Charity Shield, and began as a contest between the respective champions of the Football League and Southern League, although in 1913 it was played between an Amateurs XI and a Professionals XI. In 1921, it was played by the league champions of the Football League First Division and the FA Cup winners for the first time. The 1974 match was the first Charity Shield game to be played at Wembley Stadium as the Football Association (the FA) tried to revive the status of the match as a traditional season curtain-raiser by moving it to the country's showpiece venue. Furthermore, the FA insisted that the League champions and FA Cup winners must both take part for the first time since 1970.

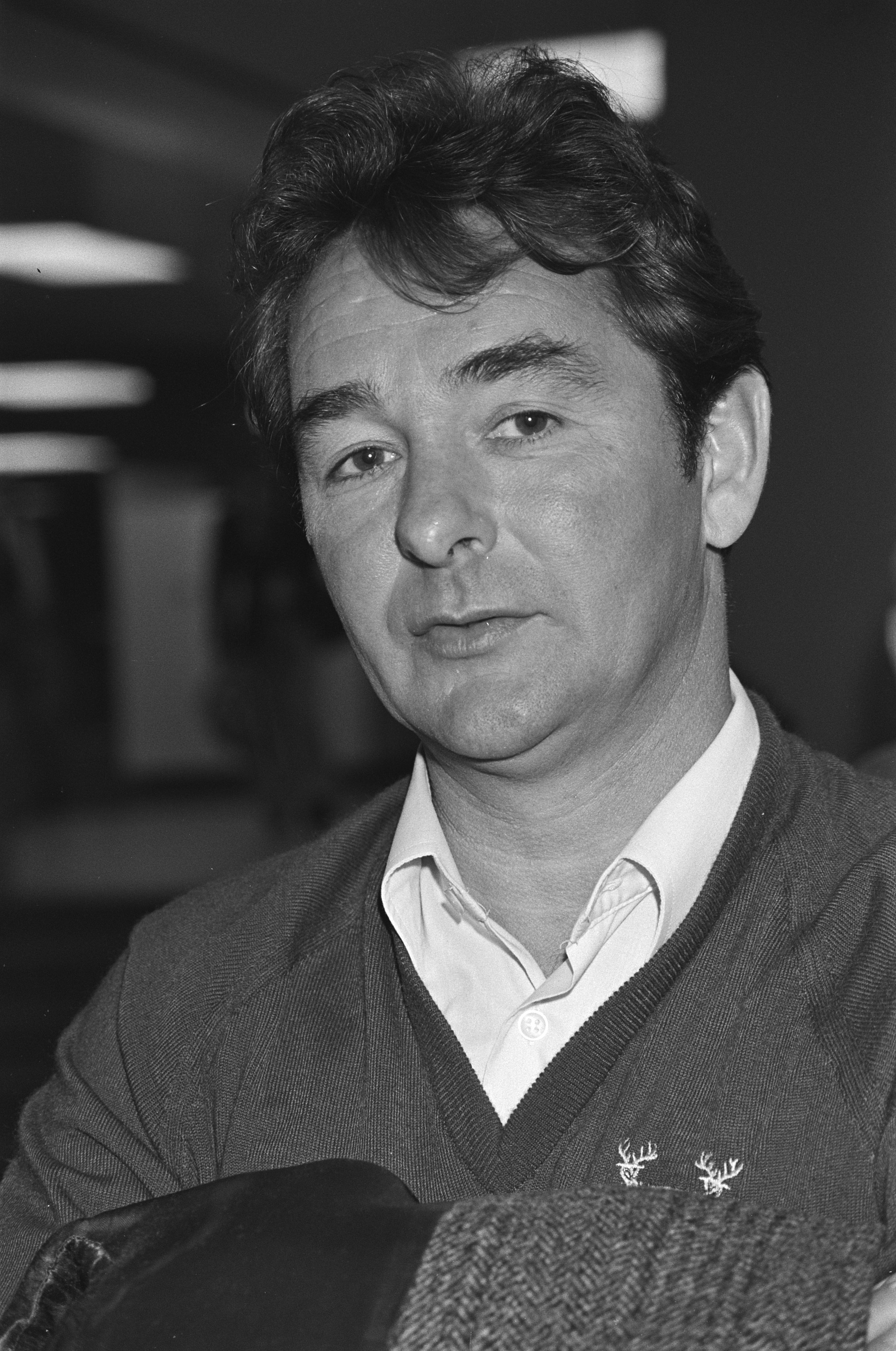
Brian Clough in 1980, when he was managing Nottingham Forest

The 1973–74 Football League champions Leeds United and the 1974 FA Cup winners Liverpool had been two of the best teams in England for the last ten years, and there was intense rivalry between them with, as the Leeds United website says, "some bitter battles down the years, but it is doubtful whether there had ever been an angrier encounter than [the 1974 Charity Shield]". Liverpool had been managed by Bill Shankly since December 1959 and Leeds by Don Revie since March 1961. Both managers had lifted their clubs out of the Second Division (Liverpool in 1962, Leeds in 1964) and established them as leading members of the First Division. Since Liverpool were promoted in 1962, they had won the league championship three times, the FA Cup twice and the UEFA Cup once. Leeds since promotion in 1964 had won the championship twice, the FA Cup once, the Football League Cup once and the Inter-Cities Fairs Cup twice. The two clubs had previously met at Wembley in May 1965 when Liverpool won the FA Cup for the first time, defeating Leeds 2–1 after extra time in the final.

Having won the League championship and the FA Cup respectively in 1973–74, Revie and Shankly both left their clubs. On 4 July 1974, Revie was appointed as manager of the England national team in succession to Sir Alf Ramsey. Only eight days later, on 12 July, Shankly announced his retirement from football management in a press conference at Anfield. There was much speculation about how two such high-profile jobs would be filled. In one case, at Liverpool, there was a straightforward solution which resulted in their young team taking, in the words of Leeds United's own website, "a vice like grip on the English game". At Leeds, however, the succession to Revie could not have been more controversial, especially when, as the Leeds website itself says of the club's ageing team, "Leeds were on the wane".

On 26 July, Liverpool decided to seek continuity and appointed Shankly's assistant Bob Paisley as their new manager. Reserve team coach Joe Fagan was promoted to be Paisley's assistant, and the Liverpool success story continued into the 1980s and beyond.

On 30 July, Brian Clough was appointed team manager of Leeds, parting company with Brighton & Hove Albion and his erstwhile assistant Peter Taylor, who succeeded him as Brighton manager. Clough had been a long-term and outspoken critic of Revie's team and his appointment was a major surprise. Problems quickly surfaced, beginning only two days later when Mike Bamber, the Brighton chairman, accused Leeds of reneging on a "gentleman's agreement" to compensate his club for Clough's services. Bamber claimed that Leeds had agreed to pay £75,000; this was rejected by Leeds who maintained, even after a writ was issued, that Clough had applied for the job with no enticement by them.

On 6 August, Clough completed the signing of Duncan McKenzie from his own future club Nottingham Forest for £250,000 – a record fee for both clubs at the time. Later the same day, Liverpool played a friendly at 1. FC Kaiserslautern in which Kevin Keegan was sent off. On 8 August, all Football League referees were given a new "get tough" charter requiring them to take firm action against offenders.

== Match ==
=== Team selections ===
Bob Paisley selected ten of the players who had represented Liverpool in the FA Cup Final three months earlier. John Toshack was unavailable due to injury and was replaced by Phil Boersma. The Leeds team consisted entirely of players from their 1973–74 championship-winning squad with new signing Duncan McKenzie on the bench as a substitute.

Although Paisley was now in charge of the Liverpool team, Bill Shankly was asked to lead them onto the pitch for the last time. Brian Clough later claimed that he wanted Don Revie to do the same for Leeds but Revie, who watched the match from a seat in the stand, declined the offer. A curiosity of the match was that Liverpool had no number 10 shirt and Leeds had no number 11. Phil Boersma and Eddie Gray both wore number 12.

=== Summary ===
The 1975–76 Rothmans Football Yearbook stated frankly that the 1974–75 season opened on 10 August "with a shabby Charity Shield game at Wembley". It criticised "continuous brawling" among the players, which climaxed in the joint dismissal of Kevin Keegan and Leeds captain Billy Bremner for "swapping punches". Bill Shankly, however, contradicted that in his autobiography, saying that "it was developing into an interesting game, but it was spoiled completely when Keegan and Bremner were sent off". He added that Leeds and Liverpool had been rivals for years "and there had been no trouble".

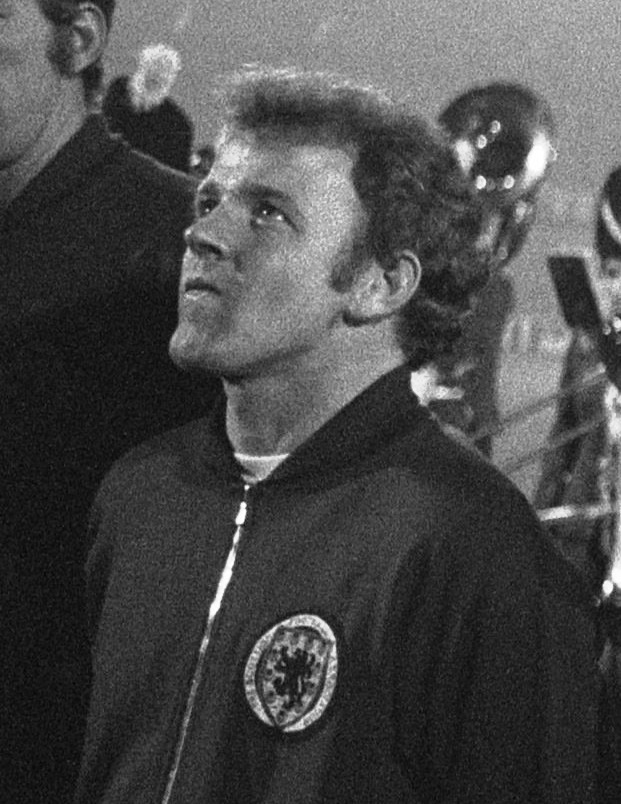
Billy Bremner in the Scotland team in 1971

The match started badly with an incident in the first minute of play, a tackle by Leeds striker Allan Clarke bringing down Phil Thompson who needed treatment. Clarke was then a marked man and was twice fouled badly himself, first by Tommy Smith and then by Alec Lindsay. Clarke was carried off after the second challenge and replaced by Duncan McKenzie. Smith was booked for his challenge on Clarke and Johnny Giles also received a booking after throwing a punch at Keegan.

Phil Boersma opened the scoring for Liverpool in the 20th minute when he was first to reach the loose ball that had been blocked by David Harvey from a shot by Keegan. Later in the first half, a shot by Emlyn Hughes from outside the penalty area hit the Leeds crossbar. The match was notorious for the fistfight between Bremner and Keegan, who were jointly dismissed by referee Bob Matthewson after sixty minutes' play. Keegan, who was angry with the decision because he claimed provocation, took off his shirt as he left the field and threw it away. Bremner, several yards behind him, then did the same. Trevor Cherry headed home the Leeds equaliser in the 70th minute and the match finished 1–1.

In earlier editions of the fixture, a draw had been an accepted result with the teams sharing the shield and each possessing it for six months. In 1974, the FA decided that a draw must be settled by a penalty shoot-out with a "best of five" round followed by "sudden death". All ten kicks taken in the best of five were converted and the round ended with the scores level at 5–5. The sudden death phase began and Leeds chose their goalkeeper David Harvey to take their first kick. He missed, hitting the ball over the crossbar. Ian Callaghan, despite slipping and falling as he kicked the ball, scored the winner for Liverpool. The final score was 6–5 and Liverpool were presented with the Charity Shield by Sir Stanley Rous, who had recently retired from his role as President of FIFA.

=== Details ===
10 August 1974
15:00

| Liverpool | 1–1 | Leeds United |
|---|---|---|
| Boersma 19' | | Cherry 70' |
Penalties
| Lindsay (penalty scored); Hughes (penalty scored); Hall (penalty scored); Smith (penalty scored); Cormack (penalty scored); Callaghan (penalty scored) | 6–5 | (penalty scored) Lorimer; (penalty scored) Giles; (penalty scored) Gray; (penalty scored) Hunter; (penalty scored) Cherry; (penalty missed) Harvey |

Wembley Stadium, London
Attendance: 67,000
Referee: Bob Matthewson

| Liverpool | Leeds United |

| GK | 1 | (England) Ray Clemence |
| RB | 2 | (England) Tommy Smith | Booked |
| LB | 3 | (England) Alec Lindsay |
| CB | 4 | (England) Phil Thompson |
| CM | 5 | (Scotland) Peter Cormack |
| CB | 6 | (England) Emlyn Hughes (c) |
| CF | 7 | (England) Kevin Keegan | (red card) 60' |
| CM | 8 | (Scotland) Brian Hall |
| LM | 9 | (Republic of Ireland) Steve Heighway |
| RM | 11 | (England) Ian Callaghan |
| CF | 12 | (England) Phil Boersma |
Substitutes:
| DF | 13 | (England) Brian Kettle |
| MF | 14 | (England) John McLaughlin |
| DF | 15 | (England) Max Thompson |
| MF | 16 | (England) Peter Spiring |
| GK | 17 | (England) Peter McDonnell |
Manager:
(England) Bob Paisley

| GK | 1 | (Scotland) David Harvey |
| RB | 2 | (England) Paul Reaney |
| LB | 3 | (England) Trevor Cherry |
| CM | 4 | (Scotland) Billy Bremner (c) | (red card) 60' |
| CB | 5 | (Scotland) Gordon McQueen |
| CB | 6 | (England) Norman Hunter |
| CM | 7 | (Scotland) Peter Lorimer |
| CF | 8 | (England) Allan Clarke | (substituted off) 58' |
| CF | 9 | (Scotland) Joe Jordan |
| RM | 10 | (Republic of Ireland) Johnny Giles | Booked |
| LM | 12 | (Scotland) Eddie Gray |
Substitutes:
| MF | 15 | (England) Duncan McKenzie | (substituted on) 58' |
Manager:
(England) Brian Clough

== Post-match ==
The actions of Bremner and Keegan were officially condemned and repercussions followed, initial statements to express "great disappointment" being made next day by both Ted Croker, FA Secretary, and Alan Hardaker, Football League Secretary. Croker, who had a greater concern about the impact on football of widespread hooliganism, was quoted as saying: "We are trying to make football more acceptable to a wider range of people. Football will survive, but players must learn they cannot throw punches at each other".

On 15 August, a Harrow resident called Tony Barlow applied to a court of law requesting that summonses be taken out against Bremner and Keegan "for behaviour in a public place likely to cause a breach of the peace". The next day, his application was refused by the magistrate.

On 28 August, the FA Disciplinary Committee charged Bremner and Keegan with "bringing the game into disrepute" and imposed what Rothmans described as "an unprecedented punishment". On top of their automatic three-match suspensions for being sent off, the FA fined Bremner and Keegan £500 each and banned them until the end of September, meaning they missed eleven matches each in total.

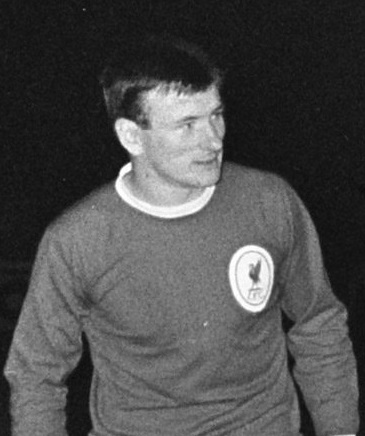
Tommy Smith in 1966, playing for Liverpool

There was much criticism of the FA's decision from people in football. Bob Paisley, for example, said: "People who don't know how to run the country are trying to run football, which they know even less about". In answer to this criticism, the chairman of the disciplinary committee, Vernon Stokes, admitted that "the punishments might not have been quite so severe" if the match had not been played at Wembley and shown on television.

Tommy Smith, booked during the game for his tackle on Clarke, had been called to the hearing to give evidence. He condemned the whole affair as a farce. Smith confirmed that the initial foul on Keegan was committed by Johnny Giles, not Bremner, but Bremner was the first Leeds player Keegan saw when he turned to retaliate. Smith says that as soon as he came into the hearing, an unnamed FA official immediately accused him of starting all the trouble with his "very first tackle of the game". Smith retorted that the man was not even at the game and so how could he know that? The FA official replied by saying: "This is a democratic hearing of the evidence, you're not allowed to ask questions". Smith says he laughed out loud at the absurdity of that statement. At this point Matt Busby, who was on the FA committee, intervened and said: "I saw what happened. That'll be all, Tommy, thanks for coming". Smith says he left the room "wondering how it was possible that a person such as that committee member could have a key role in the running of football in this country".

Brian Clough was not at Leeds much longer, being sacked on 12 September less than eight weeks after he arrived. In later years, he reflected on the 1974 Charity Shield and said: "Billy Bremner's behaviour was scandalous, producing one of the most notorious incidents in Wembley history". In response, a Leeds United fan website states that it was probably "six of one and half a dozen of the other", and that Clough's "one-eyed version of events" was coloured by his nightmare experience at the club.

Bob Paisley managed Liverpool for nine years until he retired after the 1982–83 season and was succeeded by Joe Fagan. Under Paisley's management, Liverpool won six League Championships, three League Cups, six Charity Shields, three European Cups, one UEFA Cup and one UEFA Super Cup. At the time of his retirement, he had won the Manager of the Year Award a record six times.

== See also ==
- 1974–75 Football League First Division
- 1974–75 FA Cup
