= Bob Matthewson =

English footballer and referee

Personal information
- Full name: Robert Matthewson
- Date of birth: 13 April 1930
- Place of birth: Newcastle upon Tyne, England
- Date of death: 10 November 2000 (aged 70)
- Place of death: Bolton, England
- Position: Centre half

Youth career
- Byker YC

Senior career*
Years	Team	Apps	(Gls)
1947–1953	Bolton Wanderers	3	(0)
1953–?	Lincoln City	?	(?)
Total		3	(0)
- * Club domestic league appearances and goals

Robert Matthewson (13 April 1930 – 10 November 2000) was an English footballer and FIFA referee. Born in Newcastle upon Tyne, Matthewson had a spell playing for the Byker Youth Club's football team before he was signed by Bolton Wanderers. After six appearances for Bolton in six seasons, including three appearances in the Football League, Matthewson was allowed to leave the club on a free transfer by manager Bill Ridding. He then joined Lincoln City but never played a league game for them. He then entered National Service. Upon his return an engineering colleague persuaded him to take up refereeing back in Bolton in 1958–1959, progressing through local leagues to the Lancashire Combination and Northern Premier League.

Matthewson became a Football League linesman in 1966 and two years later joined the list of referees. He made a quick impression and was senior linesman for the 1970 FA Cup final between Chelsea and Leeds. A year later he took charge of the League Cup semi-final between Stoke City and West Ham United and in late 1972 was promoted to the FIFA List of referees. He was in charge of the remarkable 1974 FA Charity Shield match. This was Brian Clough's first major match as manager of Leeds but became better-known for a double sending-off. Matthewson sent Leeds United's Billy Bremner and Liverpool's Kevin Keegan off for fighting, the first time players had been dismissed in a major British club match at Wembley. The following year he was referee for the FA Cup semi-final at Hillsborough between Birmingham City and Fulham. Matthewson refereed the return leg of the 1976–77 European Cup Winners' Cup semi-final match between Anderlecht and Napoli at the Stade Émile Versé in Belgium. His decision to disallow Walter Speggiorin's second-minute goal for Napoli was criticised. The Italian forward was adjudged by Matthewson to have been in an offside position when he scored. However, after reviewing the replay of the incident, both the Belgian commentary team and Anderlecht's own manager, Raymond Goethals, agreed with Napoli's assessment that Speggiorin was onside, and added that the goal should have stood. His career in England culminated with Manchester United's 2–1 win over Liverpool in the 1977 FA Cup Final, the result ending Liverpool's hopes of the domestic League and Cup double. In May 1977 he signed on to become an official in the North American Soccer League.

On the international stage he only officiated two full international matches: the first was a UEFA Euro 1976 qualifying Group 8 match between Malta and Greece on 23 February 1975 and the second was a friendly between Wales and West Germany on 6 October 1976. He also refereed the 1974–75 UEFA Cup semi-final first leg between Köln and Borussia Mönchengladbach on 8 April 1975.

With his wife, Pauline, Matthewson had a daughter Karen, a step-daughter Suzanne and three grandchildren. As well as playing and refereeing football, Matthewson also worked as an engineer for de Havilland in Horwich. Matthewson was portrayed in the 2009 film The Damned United by Peter Quinn, the secretary of Blackburn non-league football club Sporting Athletic.
