= Paul Garner (disambiguation) =

Paul Garner (1909–2004) was an American vaudeville actor

Paul Garner may also refer to:

- Paul Garner (comedian) (born 1968/1969), British comedy writer and performer
- Paul Garner (doctor) (born 1955), British epidemiologist
- Paul Garner (footballer) (born 1955), English footballer

== See also ==
- Paul Gardner (disambiguation)
