= Colin Morris (footballer) =

English footballer

Personal information
- Date of birth: 22 August 1953 (age 73)
- Place of birth: Blyth, England
- Height: 5 ft 7 in (1.70 m)
- Position: Midfielder

Senior career*
Years	Team	Apps	(Gls)
1974–1976	Burnley	10	(0)
1976–1979	Southend United	133	(25)
1979–1981	Blackpool	87	(26)
1981–1988	Sheffield United	240	(67)
1988–1989	Scarborough	24	(3)
1989–1990	Boston United	8	(3)
Total		502	(124)

Managerial career
- 1989: Scarborough
- * Club domestic league appearances and goals

Colin Morris (born 22 August 1953) is an English former footballer who played as an attacking midfielder.

Morris started his career with Burnley as an apprentice. He made his debut for Burnley in their home FA Cup defeat to non-league Wimbledon in January 1975. After six years at Turf Moor he joined Southend United. Another move took him to Blackpool, where he was the club's top League scorer in 1980–81 with twelve goals. A £100,000 transfer saw him join Sheffield United in February 1982.

His son, Lee, followed him into the Blades' ranks in the 1990s.

== Honours ==
Sheffield United

- Football League Fourth Division: 1981–82
