= 1994–95 Blackpool F.C. season =

English football club season

Blackpool F.C.
1994–95 season
- Owner and chairman: Owen Oyston
- Manager: Sam Allardyce
- Division Two: 12th
- FA Cup: First round
- League Cup: First round
- Top goalscorer: Tony Ellis (17)

The 1994–95 season was Blackpool F.C.'s 89th season (86th consecutive) in the Football League. They competed in the 24-team Division Two, then the third tier of English league football, finishing twelfth.

Sam Allardyce replaced Billy Ayre as manager prior to the start of the season.

Blackpool exited both domestic cup competitions at the first-round stage.

Tony Ellis was the club's top league scorer, with seventeen goals.

Mike Davies retired at the end of the season after eleven years of service for Blackpool, his only professional club. He subsequently moved into a coaching role at the club.

Blackpool signed veteran goalkeeper Les Sealey from Manchester United before the season began, but he transferred back to the Premier League with a move to West Ham on 28 November.

== Table ==
Pos	Team	Pld	W	D	L	GF	GA	GD	Pts	Promotion or relegation
10	Swansea City	46	19	14	13	57	45	+12	71	
11	Stockport County	46	19	8	19	63	60	+3	65	
12	Blackpool	46	18	10	18	64	70	−6	64	
13	Wrexham	46	16	15	15	65	64	+1	63	Qualification for the Cup Winners' Cup qualifying round
14	Bradford City	46	16	12	18	57	64	−7	60	
