= Tony Kellow =

English footballer (1952–2011)

Personal information
- Full name: Tony Kellow
- Date of birth: 1 May 1952
- Place of birth: Budock Water, Cornwall, UK
- Date of death: 20 February 2011 (aged 58)
- Place of death: Truro, Cornwall, UK
- Height: 5 ft 10 in (1.78 m)
- Position: Forward

Senior career*
Years	Team	Apps	(Gls)
1970?–1973	Penzance		
1973–1974	Falmouth Town	30	(43)
1974?–1975	Penzance		
1975–1976	Falmouth Town	44	(46)
1976–1978	Exeter City	107	(40)
1978–1980	Blackpool	57	(23)
1980–1984	Exeter City	143	(61)
1984	Plymouth Argyle	10	(2)
1984	Swansea City	1	(0)
1984–1985	Newport County	20	(8)
1985–1988	Exeter City	82	(28)
1998	Wendron FC	1	(0)
- * Club domestic league appearances and goals

Tony Kellow (1 May 1952 – 20 February 2011) was an English professional footballer. He played as a forward and made over 400 Football League appearances in the 1970s and 1980s.

== Early career ==
He was born in Budock Water, a village near Falmouth, and on leaving school he found employment in Falmouth Docks as an electrician, later turning out for the Falmouth Docks football side. At the age of seventeen he played in the South Western Football League for Penzance, helping them win the Cornwall Senior Cup in 1973. He then moved to his home-town side Falmouth Town, before moving back to play for Penzance in 1974/75, winning a South Western League championship medal. In 1975, he returned to Falmouth Town.

== Football League ==
A centre-forward, his professional career began when he signed for Exeter City from Falmouth Town in 1976, for a fee of £12,000. Tony won the Football League's "Golden Boot" in 1980/81 for being the highest goal scorer in all four divisions. He was sold to Blackpool, in November 1978, for £125,000, which was Blackpool's record outlay at the time.

He returned to Exeter City for a second spell, and joined Plymouth Argyle in 1983. After 13 appearances with Plymouth he moved to Swansea City in March 1984.

He then moved to Newport County, before a return for a third spell with Exeter City.

== Death ==
Kellow died on 20 February 2011, in Truro's Treliske Hospital of kidney failure after being found unconscious at his Budock Water home. He was 58 years old. His funeral service was held at St Budock Parish Church on 28 February 2011, and his body was then cremated at Truro's Penmount Crematorium. A memorial stone in honour of Kellow stands close to the Trelowarren Arms pub in Budock Water.
