= 1982–83 Blackpool F.C. season =

English football club season

Blackpool F.C.
1982–83 season
- Manager: Sam Ellis
- Division Four: 21st
- FA Cup: Second round
- League Cup: Third round
- Top goalscorer: League: Dave Bamber (10); All: Dave Bamber (15)
Home colours

The 1982–83 season was Blackpool F.C.'s 75th season (72nd consecutive) in the Football League. They competed in the 24-team Division Four, then the bottom tier of English football, finishing 21st, their lowest-ever finish in the Football League. The club had to seek re-election to the League, and they were successful in their application, as were the other three bottom-four clubs.

Sam Ellis succeeded Allan Brown as manager prior to the start of the season.

Dave Bamber was the club's top scorer for the second consecutive season, with fifteen goals (ten in the league, one in the FA Cup and four in the League Cup).

On 17 January 1983, the Football League deducted Blackpool two points for fielding an ineligible player. John Butler had played two League games and one League Cup game without his registration having been confirmed. The club explained that they had signed him on 8 September and immediately sent off his registration forms to the Football League, who were then based in nearby Lytham St. Annes. Blackpool chose not to appeal, as there were stiffer options available to the committee. The points deduction saw the Seasiders slip two places. Had they not been docked points, they would have finished safely in 18th and would not have needed to re-apply.

== Table ==
Pos	Team	Pld	W	D	L	GF	GA	GD	Pts	Promotion
19	Tranmere Rovers	46	13	11	22	49	71	−22	50	
20	Rochdale	46	11	16	19	55	73	−18	49	
21	Blackpool	46	13	12	21	55	74	−19	49 (Note: Blackpool had two points deducted.)	Re-elected
22	Hartlepool United	46	13	9	24	46	76	−30	48	Re-elected
23	Crewe Alexandra	46	11	8	27	53	71	−18	41	Re-elected
