= 1981–82 Blackpool F.C. season =

English football club season

Blackpool F.C.
1981–82 season
- Manager: Allan Brown
- Division Four: 12th
- FA Cup: Fourth round
- League Cup: First round
- Top goalscorer: League: Dave Bamber (15); All: Dave Bamber (17)
Home colours

The 1981–82 season was Blackpool F.C.'s 74th season (71st consecutive) in the Football League. They competed in the 24-team Division Four, then the bottom tier of English football, finishing twelfth.

This was the first season in which three points were awarded for a win, instead of two.

Dave Bamber was the club's top scorer, with seventeen goals (fifteen in the league, one in the FA Cup and one in the League Cup).

== Table ==
Pos	Team	Pld	W	D	L	GF	GA	GD	Pts
10	Hereford United	46	16	19	11	64	58	+6	67
11	Tranmere Rovers	46	14	18	14	51	56	−5	60
12	Blackpool	46	15	13	18	66	60	+6	58
13	Darlington	46	15	13	18	61	62	−1	58
14	Hartlepool United	46	13	16	17	73	84	−11	55
