= 1979–80 Blackpool F.C. season =

English football club season

Blackpool F.C.
1979–80 season
- Manager: Stan Ternent (succeeded by Alan Ball)
- Division Three: 18th
- FA Cup: First round
- League Cup: Second round
- Top goalscorer: League: Stan McEwan & Tony Kellow (12); All: Stan McEwan (14)
Home colours

The 1979–80 season was Blackpool F.C.'s 72nd season (69th consecutive) in the Football League. They competed in the 24-team Division Three, then the third tier of English football, finishing eighteenth.

Stan Ternent succeeded Bob Stokoe as manager prior to the start of the season; however, he too was replaced during the campaign itself, by former player Alan Ball.

Stan McEwan was the club's top scorer, with fourteen goals (twelve in the league, one in the FA Cup and one in the League Cup). Tony Kellow was the joint-top scorer in the league.

== Table ==
Pos	Team	Pld	W	D	L	GF	GA	GD	Pts
16	Gillingham	46	14	14	18	49	51	−2	42
17	Oxford United	46	14	13	19	57	62	−5	41
18	Blackpool	46	15	11	20	62	74	−12	41
19	Brentford	46	15	11	20	59	73	−14	41
20	Hull City	46	12	16	18	51	69	−18	40

Source: rsssf.com
