= 1977–78 Blackpool F.C. season =

English football club season

Blackpool F.C.
1977–78 season
- Manager: Allan Brown (succeeded by Jimmy Meadows)
- Division Two: 20th (relegated)
- FA Cup: Third round
- League Cup: Second round
- Top goalscorer: League: Bob Hatton (22); All: Bob Hatton (24)
Home colours

The 1977–78 season was Blackpool F.C.'s 70th season (67th consecutive) in the Football League. They competed in the 22-team Division Two, then the second tier of English football, finishing twentieth, their lowest League position since 1928. As a result, they were relegated to Division Three for the first time in their history.

Allan Brown was sacked as manager during the season, and replaced by Jimmy Meadows for his second stint as Blackpool's caretaker manager.

Bob Hatton was the club's top scorer, with 24 goals (22 in the league, one in the FA Cup and one in the League Cup).

== Table ==
Pos	Team	Pld	W	D	L	GF	GA	GD	Pts	Relegation
18	Bristol Rovers	42	13	12	17	61	77	−16	38	
19	Cardiff City	42	13	12	17	51	71	−20	38	
20	Blackpool (R)	42	12	13	17	59	60	−1	37	Relegation to the Third Division
21	Mansfield Town (R)	42	10	11	21	49	69	−20	31	Relegation to the Third Division
22	Hull City (R)	42	8	12	22	34	52	−18	28	Relegation to the Third Division

Rules for classification: 1) Points; 2) Goal difference; 3) Goals scored
(R) Relegated
