= 1978–79 Blackpool F.C. season =

English football club season

Blackpool F.C.
1978–79 season
- Manager: Bob Stokoe
- Division Three: 12th
- FA Cup: Second round
- League Cup: Third round
- Top goalscorer: League: Derek Spence (16); All: Derek Spence (17)
Home colours

The 1978–79 season was Blackpool F.C.'s 71st season (68th consecutive) in the Football League. They competed in the 24-team Division Three, then the third tier of English football, finishing twelfth.

Bob Stokoe was installed as manager during the summer, his second stint in the role. He remained in charge for only one season, however.

Derek Spence was the club's top scorer, with seventeen goals (sixteen in the league and one in the League Cup).

== Table ==
Pos	Team	Pld	W	D	L	GF	GA	GD	Pts
10	Brentford	46	19	9	18	53	49	+4	47
11	Oxford United	46	14	18	14	44	50	−6	46
12	Blackpool	46	18	9	19	61	59	+2	45
13	Southend United	46	15	15	16	51	49	+2	45
14	Sheffield Wednesday	46	13	19	14	53	53	0	45

Source: rsssf.com
