= 1980–81 Blackpool F.C. season =

English football club season

Blackpool F.C.
1980–81 season
- Manager: Alan Ball (succeeded by Allan Brown)
- Division Three: 23rd (relegated)
- FA Cup: Second round
- League Cup: Second round
- Top goalscorer: League: Colin Morris (12); All: Colin Morris (16)
- Highest home attendance: 10,427 (v. Rotherham United, 20 August 1980)
Home colours

The 1980–81 season was Blackpool F.C.'s 73rd season (70th consecutive) in the Football League. They competed in the 24-team Division Three, then the third tier of English football, finishing second-bottom. As a result, they were relegated to Division Four, the League's basement division, for the first time in their history.

Alan Ball was succeeded as manager during the season by Allan Brown, the Scot's second stint in the role.

Colin Morris was the club's top scorer, with sixteen goals (twelve in the league, one in the FA Cup and three in the League Cup).

Blackpool played local neighbours Fleetwood Town in the first round of the FA Cup. The 22 November tie was originally scheduled to be played at the Fishermen's Highbury Stadium; instead, it was switched to Bloomfield Road, and since Blackpool were the "away" team, they played in their alternative light-blue kit.

== Table ==
Pos	Team	Pld	W	D	L	GF	GA	GD	Pts	Promotion or relegation
20	Walsall	46	13	15	18	59	74	−15	41	
21	Sheffield United (R)	46	14	12	20	65	63	+2	40	Relegation to the Fourth Division
22	Colchester United (R)	46	14	11	21	45	65	−20	39	Relegation to the Fourth Division
23	Blackpool (R)	46	9	14	23	45	75	−30	32	Relegation to the Fourth Division
24	Hull City (R)	46	8	16	22	40	71	−31	32	Relegation to the Fourth Division

Source: rsssf.com
(R) Relegated
