= George Eastham =

English footballer (1936–2024)

George Eastham OBE
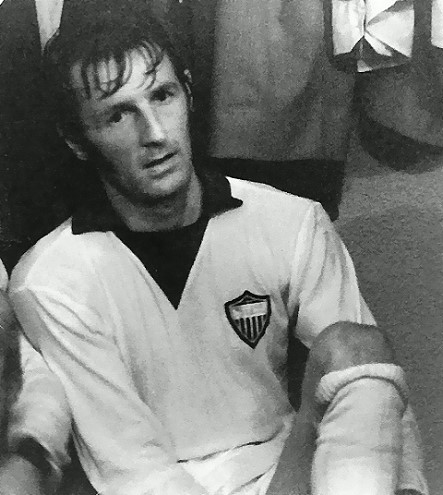
- Eastham with Hellenic in 1973

Personal information
- Full name: George Edward Eastham
- Date of birth: 23 September 1936
- Place of birth: Blackpool, Lancashire, England
- Date of death: 20 December 2024 (aged 88)
- Height: 1.70 m (5 ft 7 in)
- Positions: Midfielder; inside forward

Senior career*
Years	Team	Apps	(Gls)
1953–1956	Ards	51	(13)
1956–1960	Newcastle United	124	(29)
1960–1966	Arsenal	207	(41)
1966–1973	Stoke City	194	(4)
1967	→ Cleveland Stokers (loan)	11	(1)
1970	→ Cape Town City (loan)	17	(1)
1971	→ Hellenic (loan)	26	(2)
1972	→ Hellenic (loan)		
1975	East London United		
Total		536	(75)

International career
1959–1960	England U23	6	(3)
1963–1966	England	19	(2)

Managerial career
- 1977–1978: Stoke City
Medal record
Men's football
Representing England
FIFA World Cup
Winner	1966 England
- * Club domestic league appearances and goals

George Edward Eastham OBE (23 September 1936 – 20 December 2024) was an English footballer who played as a midfielder or inside forward for Newcastle United, Arsenal and Stoke City, as well as being a member of England's 1966 World Cup-winning squad. He is also notable for his involvement in a 1963 court case which proved a landmark in improving players' freedom to move between clubs.

Eastham began his career with Northern Irish side Ards before moving back to England to play for Newcastle United in 1956. He became an inside forward for them but then demanded a move away which Newcastle rejected. Eastham went to court and won his case before moving to Arsenal. Eastham spent six seasons at Highbury, making 223 appearances scoring 41 goals before joining Stoke City in 1966. His experience helped Stoke enjoy a successful spell in the early 1970s and Eastham scored the winning goal in the 1972 League Cup final.

Eastham also spent time coaching in South Africa, playing for Hellenic before returning to Stoke to become assistant manager to Tony Waddington. When Waddington resigned in March 1977, Eastham was appointed manager, but was unable to prevent Stoke being relegated in the 1976–77 season. After failing to mount a promotion challenge the following season, Eastham was sacked in January 1978. He then returned to coach in South Africa.

== Playing career ==
=== Newcastle United ===
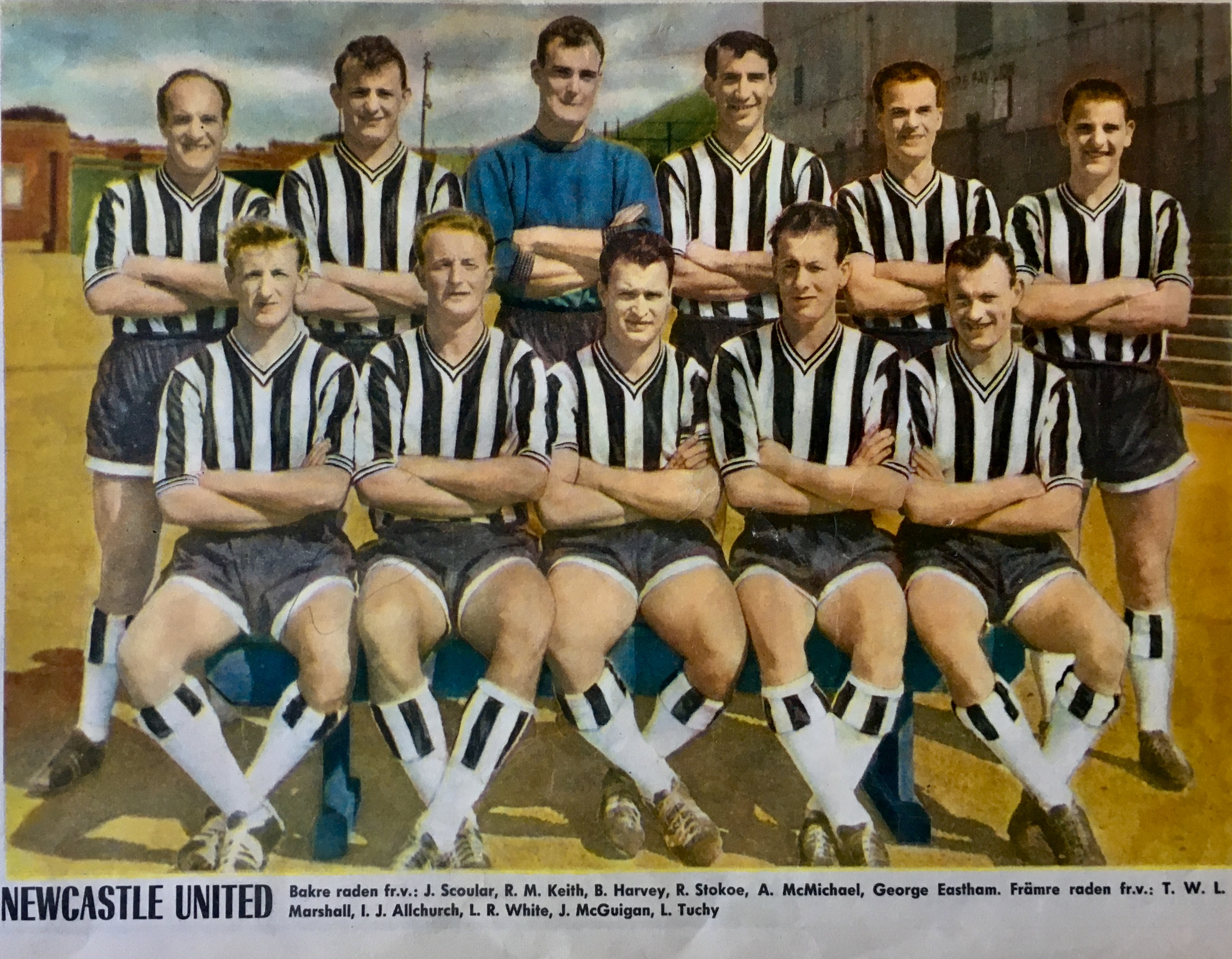
Newcastle United F.C. in 1960 with these players – from the left, standing: Jimmy Scoular, Dick Keith, Bryan Harvey (goalkeeper), Bob Stokoe, Alf McMichael and George Eastham; seated: Terry Marshall, Ivor Allchurch, Len White, John McGuigan and Liam Tuohy.

Eastham was part of a footballing family – his father, also named George, was an England international who played for Bolton Wanderers and Blackpool, while his uncle Harry Eastham played for Liverpool and Accrington Stanley. In his youth, he was a useful cricketer, playing in the same Blackpool CC team as his future fellow international, Jimmy Armfield.

Eastham Jnr first played for Northern Irish club Ards, where his father was player-manager, and the two played together on the pitch. A skilful midfielder/inside forward, he was signed by Newcastle United in 1956, and made his debut against Luton Town on 6 October 1956, in a match which finished 2–2. He spent four seasons with the Magpies and during his time there, he won caps for the Football League and the England U23 side. He played 125 games for Newcastle, scoring 34 goals; their best finish during this time being eighth in the 1959–60 season.

However, during his time at Newcastle, Eastham fell out with the club, with Eastham disputing whether the house the club had supplied him was habitable, the unsatisfactory secondary job that the club had arranged (as maximum wage rules at the time forbade clubs from paying the market rate) and their attempts to stop him playing for the England U23 team. With his contract due to expire soon, in 1959, Eastham refused to sign a new one and requested a transfer. However, Newcastle refused to let Eastham go. At the time, clubs operated a system known as retain-and-transfer, which meant that teams could keep a player's registration (thus preventing them from moving) while refusing to pay them if they had requested a transfer. As Eastham later recounted:

Our contract could bind us to a club for life. Most people called it the "slavery contract". We had virtually no rights at all. It was often the case that the guy on the terrace not only earned more than us – though there's nothing wrong with that – he had more freedom of movement than us. People in business or teaching were able to hand in their notice and move on. We weren't. That was wrong.

Unable to leave, Eastham went on strike at the end of the 1959–60 season, moving south to work for an old family friend, Ernie Clay (who later became chairman of Fulham), selling cork in Guildford, Surrey, a venture which earned him more money than his Newcastle contract paid. Finally in October 1960, Newcastle relented and sold Eastham to Arsenal for £47,500. However, Eastham considered the point worth fighting for, and backed by the Professional Footballers' Association (who provided £15,000 to pay for Eastham's legal fees), he took the club to the High Court in 1963.

In the case, Eastham v. Newcastle United [1964] Ch. 413, Eastham argued that it was an unfair restraint of trade, and that Newcastle owed him £400 in unpaid wages and £650 in unpaid bonuses. The judge, Mr Justice Wilberforce, ruled partly in Eastham's favour, stating that the retain-and-transfer system was unreasonable, although he ruled that as Eastham had refused to play for Newcastle, that any payment of wages for the disputed period was at Newcastle's discretion. As a result, although Eastham did not gain personally, he succeeded in reforming the British transfer market. The "retain" element of retain-and-transfer was greatly reduced, providing fairer terms for players looking to re-sign for their clubs, and setting up a transfer tribunal for disputes.

=== Arsenal ===
Eastham made his Arsenal debut against Bolton Wanderers on 10 December 1960, and scored twice as Arsenal won 5–1. Later on that same season, he scored the equaliser against his former club Newcastle United at St James' Park, in a 3–3 draw, during which he was called "Judas" and pelted with apples. Throughout his six seasons at Arsenal, he was a regular for the side; though not a prolific goalscorer, Eastham was one of the most talented players of what was an average Arsenal side at the time; under George Swindin and Billy Wright, Arsenal never finished higher than 7th during his time there.

Eastham's time at Arsenal was often turbulent; as well as the court case against Newcastle, he fell out with Arsenal after asking for a pay rise following the maximum wage's abolition in 1961 (but eventually Arsenal relented and met his demands), and he asked for a transfer after being replaced by Joe Baker up front at the start of the 1962–63 season. However, Wright sought a compromise and eventually restored Eastham to the side, behind Baker; Eastham's form returned, he came off the transfer list and in both the 1963–64 and 1964–65 seasons, he scored ten goals, the most per season during his Arsenal career, which included two in a 4–4 draw in a memorable North London derby match against Tottenham Hotspur at Highbury in October 1963.

Eastham continued to be a regular and served as Arsenal captain between 1963 and 1966, but Arsenal's declining form – finishing 14th in the 1965–66 season — led to Wright's dismissal in the summer of 1966. By this point, Eastham was nearly 30, and the new Arsenal management sought to dismantle Wright's side in favour of younger players. He joined Stoke City in August 1966, having scored 41 goals in 223 matches for the Gunners.

=== Stoke City ===
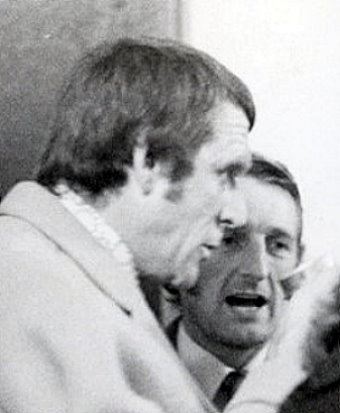
George Eastham (right)

Eastham was purchased by Stoke City manager, Tony Waddington, for a fee of £35,000, prior to the start of the 1966–67 season. Eastham spent the next eight seasons at Stoke, during which the club maintained their status in the First Division. He played in a side which combined home grown talent – such as the likes of Denis Smith, Alan Bloor and Mike Pejic — alongside the experience of veterans like Eastham and Peter Dobing. Stoke won the League Cup in the 1971–72 season, with Eastham scoring the winning goal in the final against Chelsea, which finished 2–1. At the age of 35 years 161 days, he became the oldest player to receive a winner's medal. He was also a beaten FA Cup semi-finalist in successive seasons (1970–71 and 1971–72) — both times in replays and both times by his former club Arsenal. Eastham also represented Stoke at European level, playing in the 1972–73 UEFA Cup; the first time the club had competed at European level in its history. In the first round, Stoke played Kaiserslautern of Germany but lost 5–3 on aggregate over two legs and were knocked out of the competition in the process.

In February 1971, at the age of 34, Eastham took a break from playing to develop his coaching ability, with the view of going into management. He embarked on a trip to South Africa, playing on loan with Cape Town City before having a spell as player-manager of Hellenic, who had previously been managed by his father. Eastham returned to Stoke in October 1971, to continue his playing career.

Eastham made 194 league appearances for Stoke City in total, ten of them as a substitute, scoring four goals. Eastham retired from playing in 1974, having been appointed an OBE for services to football the previous year.

== International career ==
Eastham joined the England squad for the 1962 FIFA World Cup as an uncapped player, but did not play in the tournament; his England debut finally came on 8 May 1963, against Brazil. His final game for England came in a warmup game for the 1966 FIFA World Cup, against Denmark in Copenhagen on 3 July 1966, scoring in a 2–0 win. Eastham was also part of the squad for that tournament, but did not play a single minute of England's win in the tournament.

In the 1966 World Cup final, only the 11 players on the pitch at the end of the 4–2 win over West Germany received medals. Following a Football Association led campaign to persuade FIFA to award medals to all the winners' squad members, Eastham was presented with his medal by Gordon Brown at a ceremony at 10 Downing Street on 10 June 2009.

== Managerial career ==
Eastham became Tony Waddington's assistant at Stoke, and succeeded Waddington as Stoke manager after the latter resigned in March 1977, becoming only the club's fourth manager since 1935. He took over a side depleted of their best players who had been sold off to pay for repair work at the Victoria Ground and in trouble, and their relegation from the First Division was confirmed while he was in charge, finishing 21st out of 22 in the 1976–77 season, after a run of just one win in 13 games. Eastham lasted only ten months, leaving the club in January 1978, after failing to sustain a push for promotion from the Second Division.

== Later life and death ==
After leaving the Stoke job, Eastham quit professional football completely and emigrated to South Africa in 1978. He set up his own sportswear business as well as being a football coach for local black children (being a noted opponent of apartheid). He was also chairman of the South African Arsenal Supporters' Club.

Eastham died on 20 December 2024, at the age of 88.

Since his death, only three members of England's 1966 World Cup-winning squad, Geoff Hurst, Terry Paine and Ian Callaghan, are still alive.

== Career statistics ==
=== Club ===
Appearances and goals by club, season and competition
Club	Season	League			FA Cup		League Cup		Other^{[A]}		Total	
Club	Season	Division	Apps	Goals	Apps	Goals	Apps	Goals	Apps	Goals	Apps	Goals
Newcastle United	1956–57	First Division	18	2	0	0	—		—		18	2
Newcastle United	1957–58	First Division	29	3	2	2	—		—		31	5
Newcastle United	1958–59	First Division	35	6	1	1	—		—		36	7
Newcastle United	1959–60	First Division	42	18	2	2	—		—		44	20
Newcastle United	Total		124	29	5	5	—		—		129	34
Arsenal	1960–61	First Division	19	5	1	0	0	0	—		20	5
Arsenal	1961–62	First Division	38	6	2	0	0	0	—		40	6
Arsenal	1962–63	First Division	33	4	3	0	0	0	—		36	4
Arsenal	1963–64	First Division	38	10	4	0	0	0	3 (Note: Appearances in Inter-Cities Fairs Cup)	0	45	10
Arsenal	1964–65	First Division	42	10	2	0	0	0	—		44	10
Arsenal	1965–66	First Division	37	6	1	0	0	0	—		38	6
Arsenal	Total		207	41	13	0	0	0	3	0	223	41
Stoke City	1966–67	First Division	41	1	1	0	1	0	—		43	1
Stoke City	1967–68	First Division	39	1	1	0	5	0	—		45	1
Stoke City	1968–69	First Division	27	1	4	0	2	0	—		33	1
Stoke City	1969–70	First Division	34	1	2	0	1	0	—		37	1
Stoke City	1970–71	First Division	19	0	6	0	2	0	1 (Note: Appearances in Texaco Cup)	0	28	0
Stoke City	1971–72	First Division	14	0	8	0	8	1	1	0	31	1
Stoke City	1972–73	First Division	18	0	1	0	0	0	0	0	19	0
Stoke City	1973–74	First Division	2	0	0	0	0	0	2 (Note: One appearance in Texaco Cup and one appearance in Watney Cup)	0	4	0
Stoke City	Total		194	4	23	0	19	1	4	0	240	5
Cleveland Stokers (loan)	1967	United Soccer Association	11	1	—		—		—		11	1
Career total			536	75	41	5	19	1	7	0	603	81

=== International ===
Appearances and goals by national team and year
National team	Year	Apps	Goals
England	1963	5	0
England	1964	7	1
England	1965	4	0
England	1966	2	1
Total		18	2

== Managerial statistics ==
Managerial record by team and tenure
Team	From	To	Record				
Team	From	To	P	W	D	L	Win %
Stoke City	22 March 1977	9 January 1978	37	9	12	16	24.3
Total			37	9	12	16	24.3

== Honours ==
Ards FC

- Gold Cup: 1953–54
- County Antrim Shield: 1955–56

Stoke City

- Football League Cup: 1971–72

England

- FIFA World Cup: 1966

Individual

- United Soccer Association All-Star Team: 1967
- PFA Merit Award: 1976
- English Football Hall of Fame: 2026
- Officer of the Order of the British Empire (OBE): 1973
