= Arsenal Player of the Season =

Award

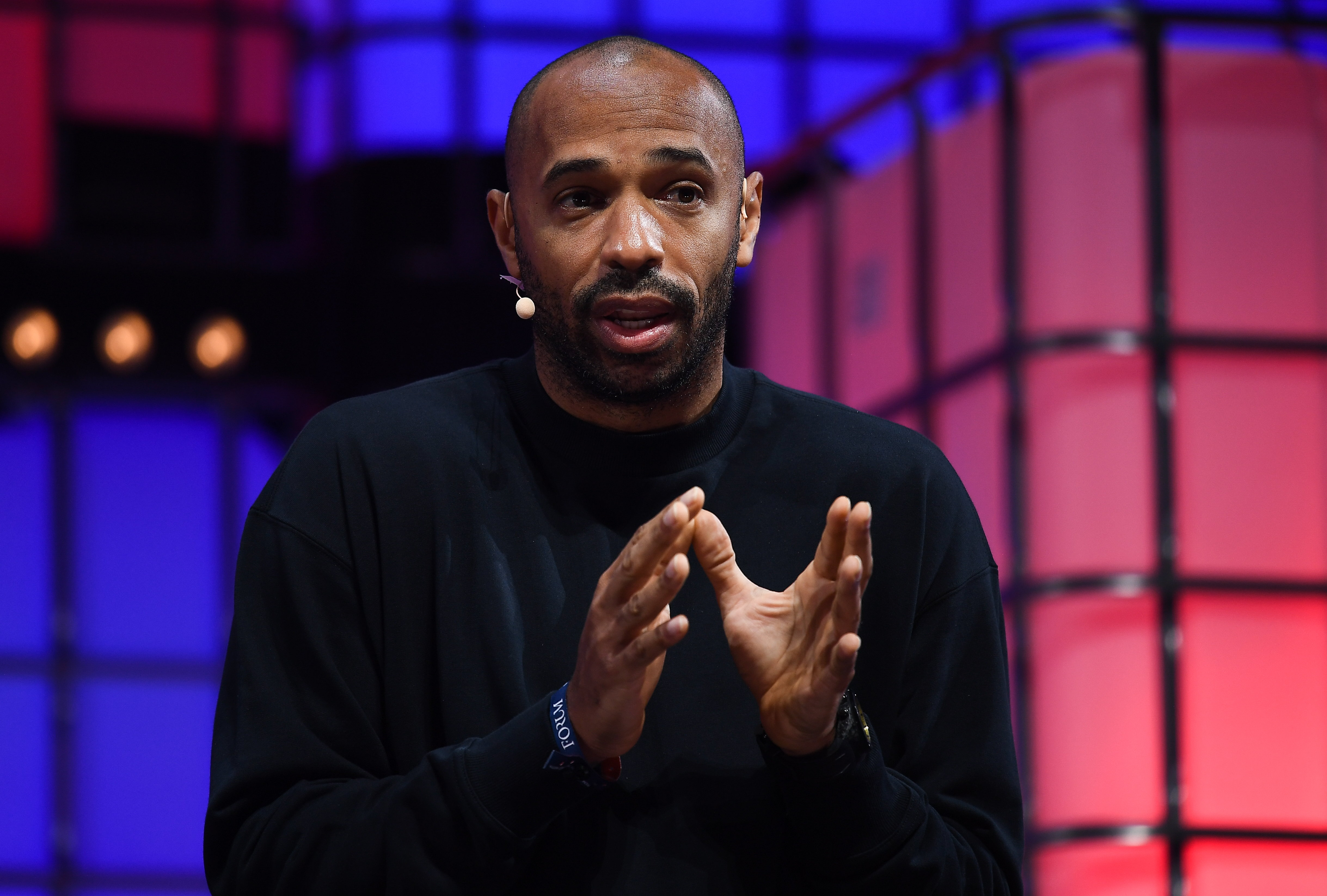
- Thierry Henry has won the award four times, the most of any player
- Sport: Association football
- Awarded for: being the best performing Arsenal player over the course of a season
- Presented by: Arsenal F.C.

History
- First award: 1967; 59 years ago
- Editions: 59 (as of 2025)
- First winner: (Scotland) Frank McLintock
- Most wins: (France) Thierry Henry (4 times)
- Most recent: (England) Declan Rice (2025–26)

The Arsenal Player of the Season award is an official award given by Arsenal Football Club to the best performing player from the club over the course of the season. The award is given based on votes by Arsenal fans on the club's website, it was previously based on votes by the Arsenal Supporters' Trust.

The inaugural award was handed to Frank McLintock in 1967 and it has been presented every season since. The 2015–16 and 2016–17 awards were officially called the Vitality Arsenal Player of the Season Award for sponsorship purposes. The award has been given to 42 different players over the course of 58 seasons, with 12 players being awarded on more than one occasion. Of these players, only Thierry Henry has won the award four times, and he is also the only player to have won the award in three consecutive years. In 1976, Republic of Ireland international Liam Brady became the first Arsenal player from outside the United Kingdom to win the award and in 1997, Dutch international Dennis Bergkamp became the first player from outside the British Isles to receive it. Following the 2014−15 season, Chilean international Alexis Sánchez was voted to become the first player from outside of Europe to win the award.

Declan Rice is the most recent winner of the award, following the 2025–26 Arsenal season.

== Award recipients ==
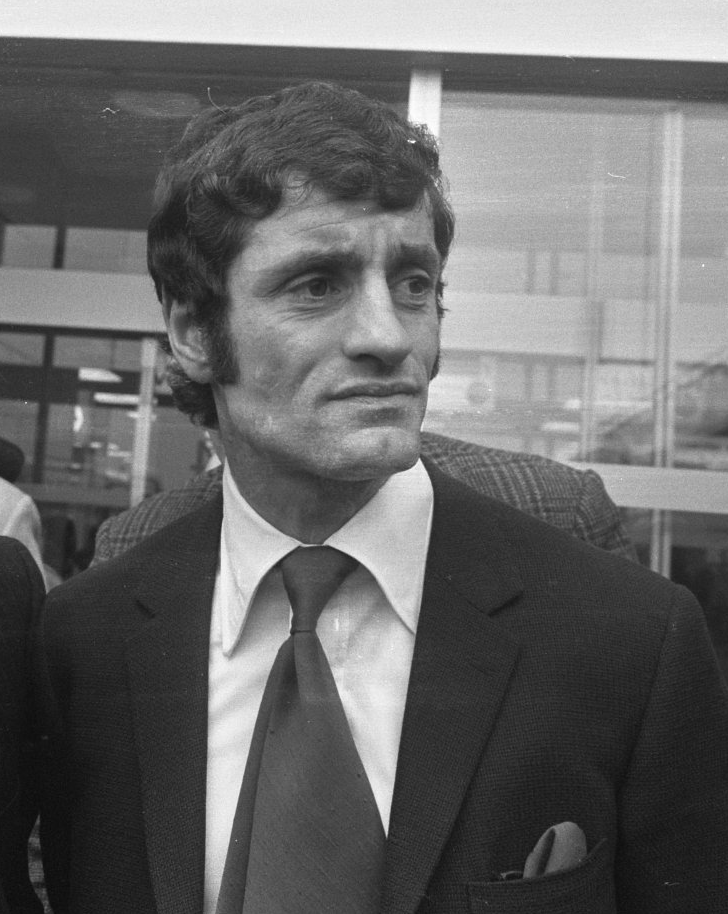
Frank McLintock won the inaugural award in 1967.

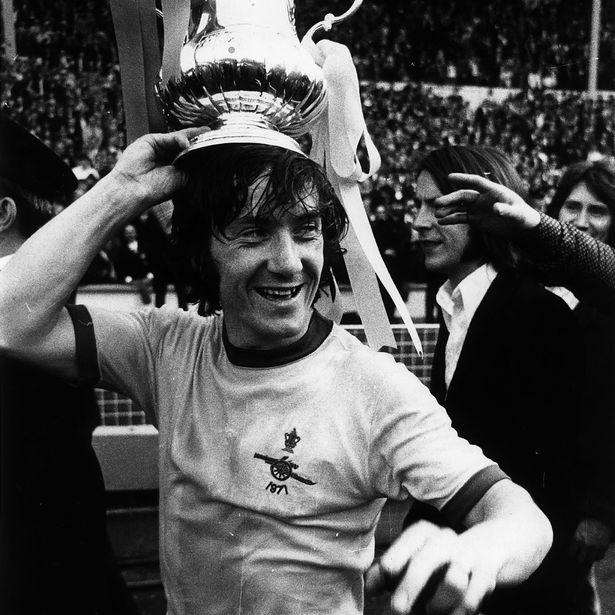
George Armstrong won the award in 1970.

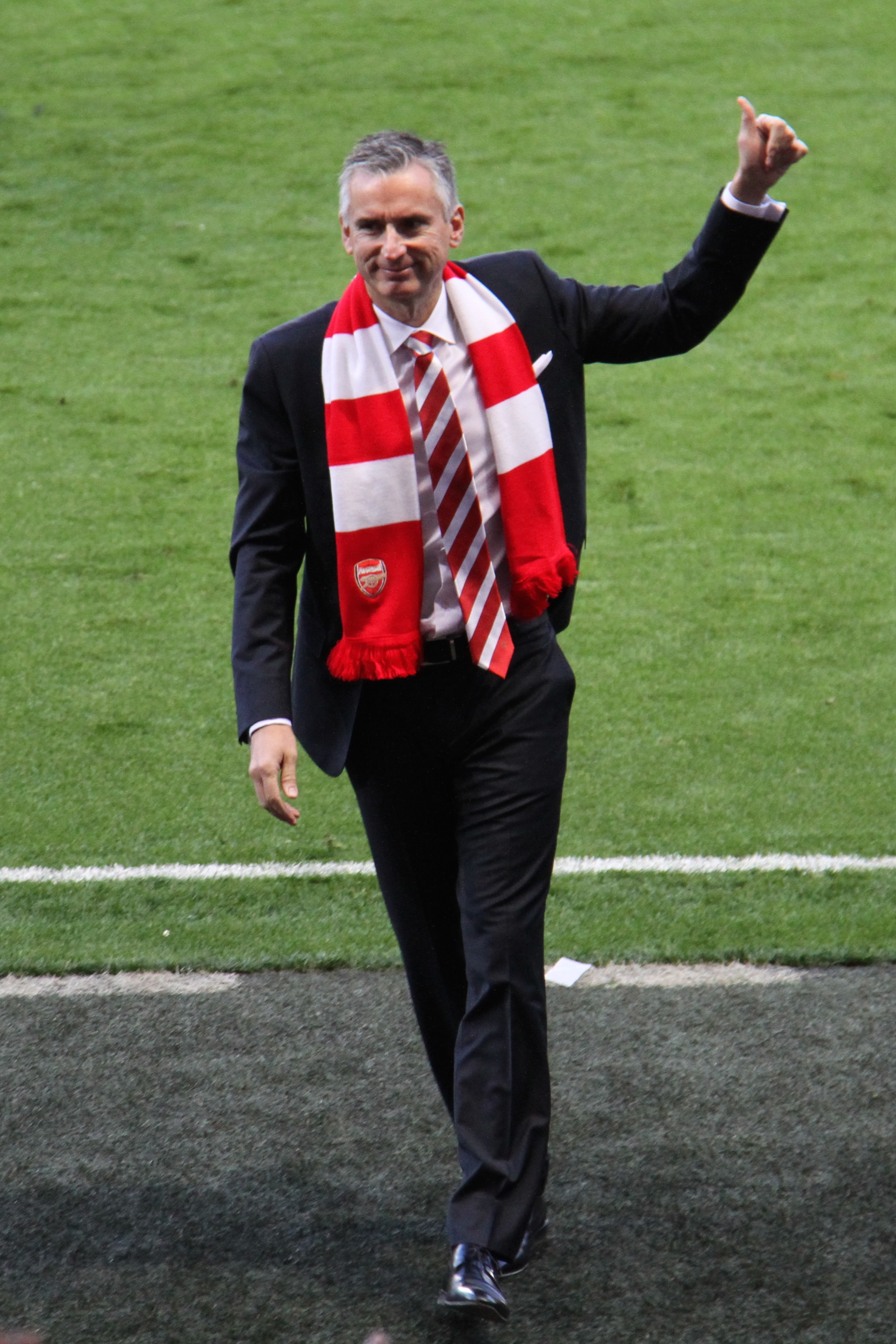
Alan Smith won the 1989 award, being the league's top scorer.

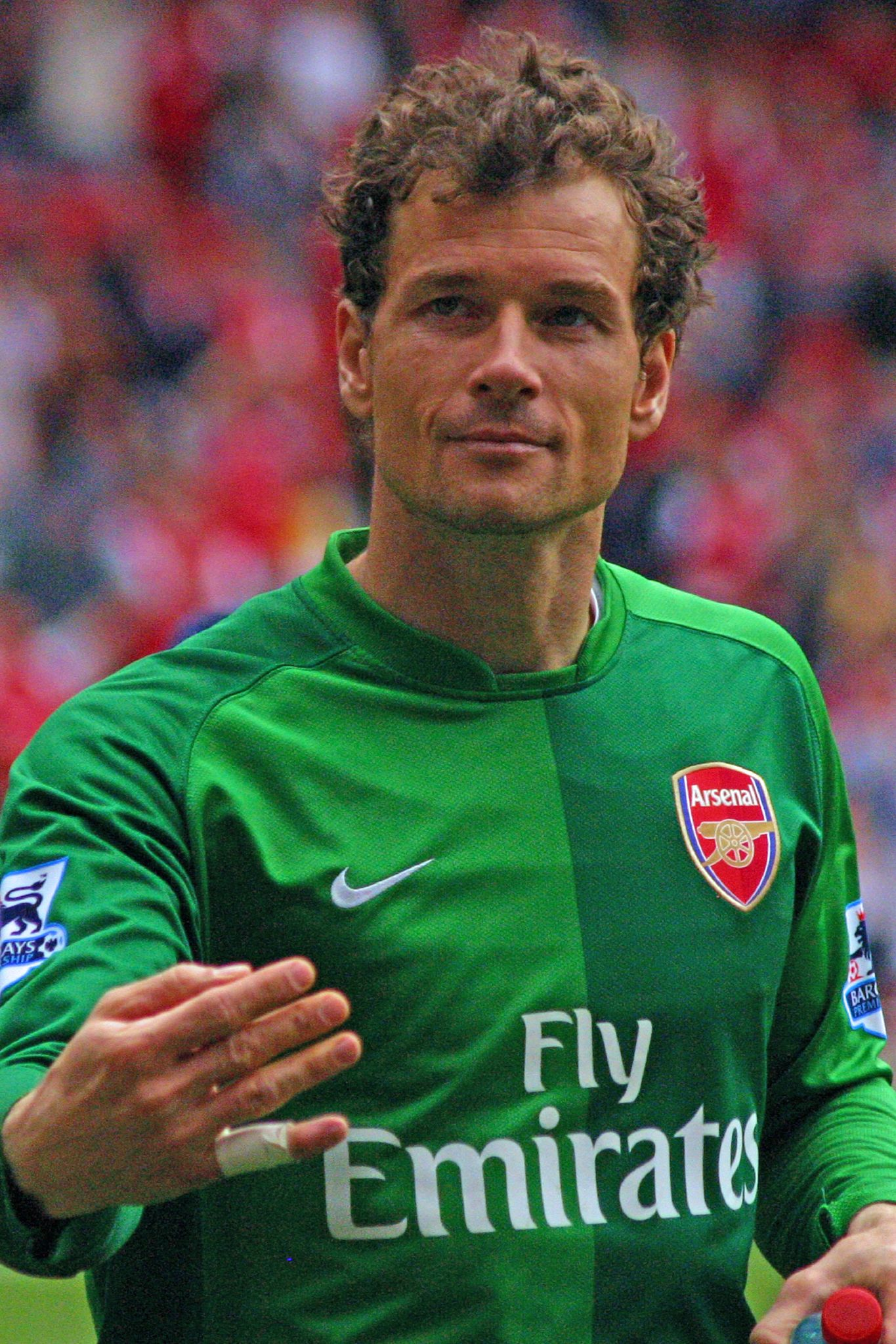
Jens Lehmann won the award in 2006.

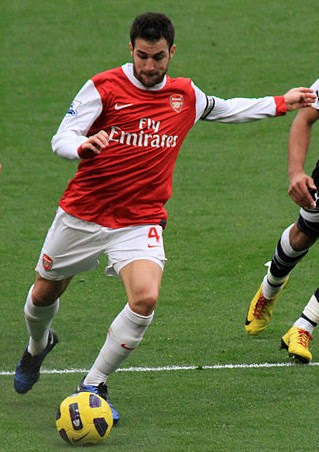
Cesc Fàbregas won the award in 2007 and 2010.

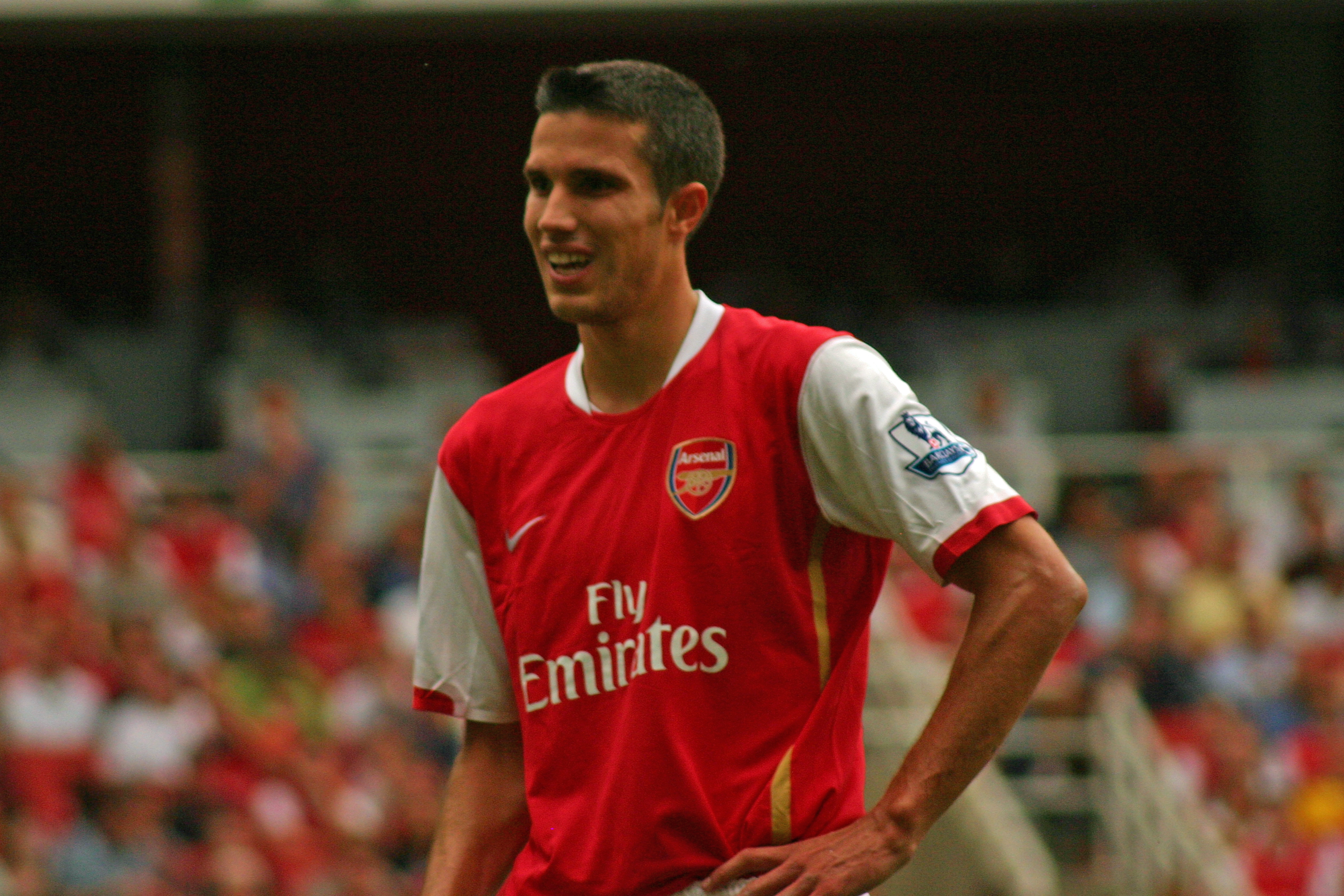
Robin van Persie won the award in 2009 and 2012.

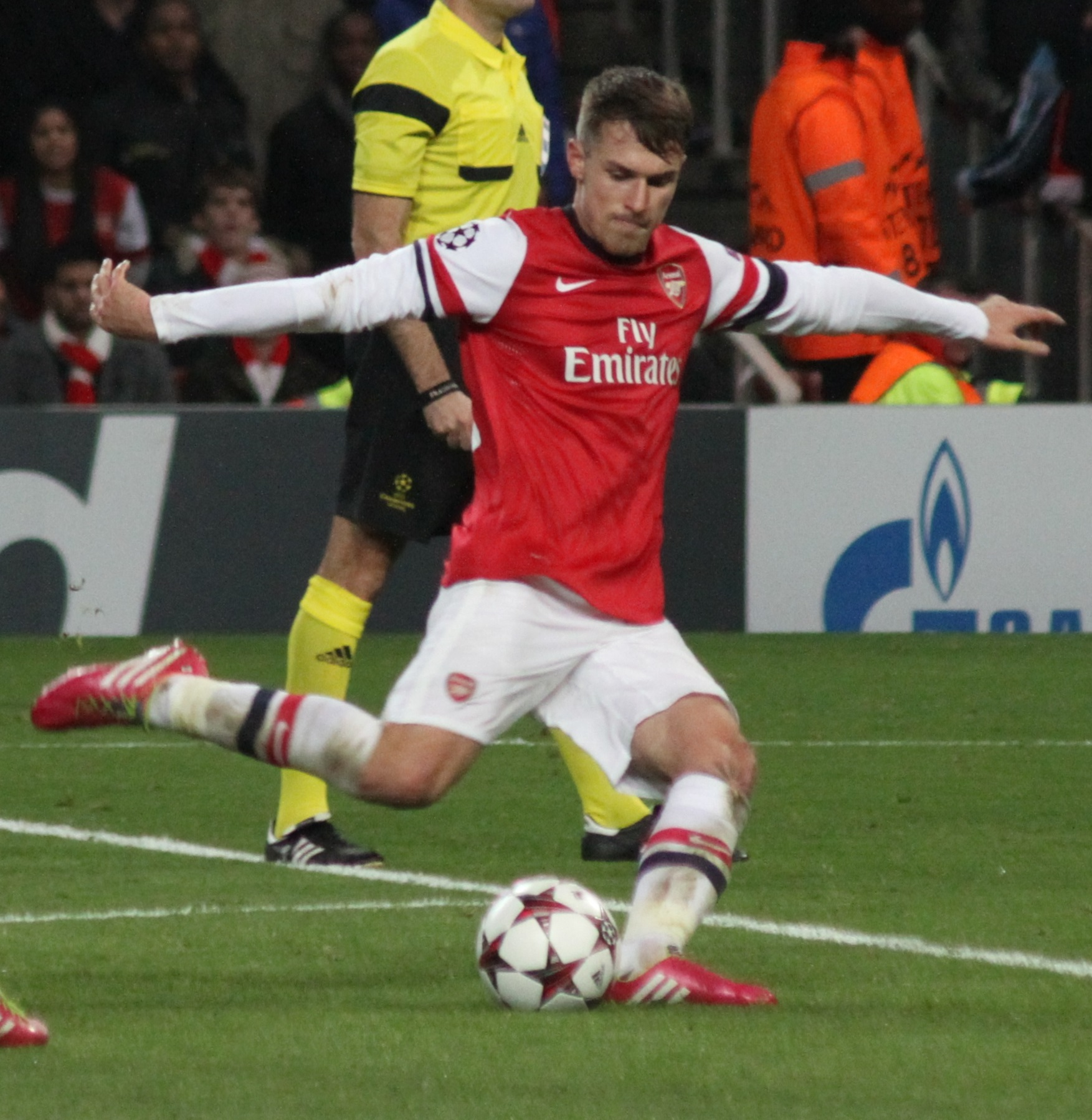
Aaron Ramsey won the award in 2014 and 2018.

Players in bold are still playing for Arsenal

Award recipients
Season	Player	Nationality	Position
1966–67	Frank McLintock	Scotland	Defender
1967–68	John Radford	England	Forward
1968–69	Peter Simpson	England	Defender
1969–70	George Armstrong	England	Forward
1970−71	Bob Wilson	Scotland	Goalkeeper
1971–72	Pat Rice	Northern Ireland	Defender
1972–73	John Radford (2)	England	Forward
1973–74	Alan Ball	England	Midfielder
1974–75	Jimmy Rimmer	England	Goalkeeper
1975–76	Liam Brady	Republic of Ireland	Midfielder
1976–77	Frank Stapleton	Republic of Ireland	Forward
1977–78	Liam Brady (2)	Republic of Ireland	Midfielder
1978–79	Liam Brady (3)	Republic of Ireland	Midfielder
1979–80	Frank Stapleton (2)	Republic of Ireland	Forward
1980–81	Kenny Sansom	England	Defender
1981–82	John Hollins	England	Defender
1982–83	Tony Woodcock	England	Forward
1983–84	Charlie Nicholas	Scotland	Forward
1984–85	Stewart Robson	England	Midfielder
1985–86	David Rocastle	England	Midfielder
1986–87	Tony Adams	England	Defender
1987–88	Michael Thomas	England	Midfielder
1988–89	Alan Smith	England	Forward
1989–90	Tony Adams (2)	England	Defender
1990–91	Steve Bould	England	Defender
1991–92	Ian Wright	England	Forward
1992–93	Ian Wright (2)	England	Forward
1993–94	Tony Adams (3)	England	Defender
1994–95	David Seaman	England	Goalkeeper
1995–96	Martin Keown	England	Defender
1996–97	Dennis Bergkamp	Netherlands	Forward
1997–98	Ray Parlour	England	Midfielder
1998–99	Nigel Winterburn	England	Defender
1999–2000	Thierry Henry	France	Forward
2000–01	Patrick Vieira	France	Midfielder
2001–02	Robert Pires	France	Forward
2002–03	Thierry Henry (2)	France	Forward
2003–04	Thierry Henry (3)	France	Forward
2004–05	Thierry Henry (4)	France	Forward
2005–06	Jens Lehmann	Germany	Goalkeeper
2006–07	Cesc Fàbregas	Spain	Midfielder
2007–08	Mathieu Flamini	France	Midfielder
2008–09	Robin van Persie	Netherlands	Forward
2009–10	Cesc Fàbregas (2)	Spain	Midfielder
2010–11	Jack Wilshere	England	Midfielder
2011–12	Robin van Persie (2)	Netherlands	Forward
2012–13	Santi Cazorla	Spain	Midfielder
2013–14	Aaron Ramsey	Wales	Midfielder
2014–15	Alexis Sánchez	Chile	Forward
2015–16	Mesut Özil	Germany	Midfielder
2016–17	Alexis Sánchez (2)	Chile	Forward
2017–18	Aaron Ramsey (2)	Wales	Midfielder
2018–19	Alexandre Lacazette	France	Forward
2019–20	Pierre-Emerick Aubameyang	Gabon	Forward
2020–21	**Bukayo Saka**	England	Midfielder
2021–22	**Bukayo Saka** (2)	England	Midfielder
2022–23	**Martin Ødegaard**	Norway	Midfielder
2023–24	**Martin Ødegaard** (2)	Norway	Midfielder
2024–25	**Declan Rice**	England	Midfielder
2025–26	**Declan Rice** (2)	England	Midfielder

=== Multiple wins ===
Players with multiple wins
Rank	Winner	Total wins	Years won
1	Thierry Henry (FRA)	4	2000, 2003, 2004, 2005
2	Liam Brady (IRL)	3	1976, 1978, 1979
2	Tony Adams (ENG)	3	1987, 1990, 1994
3	John Radford (ENG)	2	1968, 1973
3	Frank Stapleton (IRL)	2	1977, 1980
3	Ian Wright (ENG)	2	1992, 1993
3	Cesc Fàbregas (ESP)	2	2007, 2010
3	Robin van Persie (NED)	2	2009, 2012
3	Alexis Sánchez (CHI)	2	2015, 2017
3	Aaron Ramsey (WAL)	2	2014, 2018
3	Bukayo Saka (ENG)	2	2021, 2022
3	Martin Ødegaard (NOR)	2	2023, 2024
3	Declan Rice (ENG)	2	2025, 2026

=== Wins by nationality ===
Wins by nationality
Nationality	Wins
England	28
France	8
Republic of Ireland	5
Netherlands	3
Scotland	3
Spain	3
Chile	2
Germany	2
Norway	2
Wales	2
Gabon	1
Northern Ireland	1

=== Wins by playing position ===
Wins by playing position
Position	Wins
Goalkeeper	4
Defender	11
Midfielder	21
Forward	22

== See also ==
- List of Arsenal F.C. players
- List of Arsenal F.C. players (25–99 appearances)
- List of Arsenal F.C. players (1–24 appearances)
