= 1965–66 Arsenal F.C. season =

English football club season

Arsenal
1965–66 season
- Chairman: Denis Hill-Wood
- Manager: Billy Wright
- First Division: 14th
- FA Cup: Third Round
- Top goalscorer: League: Joe Baker (13); All: Joe Baker (13)
Home colours	Away colours

During the 1965–66 English football season, Arsenal F.C. competed in the Football League First Division.

== Final league table ==
Pos	Team	Pld	W	D	L	GF	GA	GAv	Pts
12	West Ham United	42	15	9	18	70	83	0.843	39
13	Blackpool	42	14	9	19	55	65	0.846	37
14	Arsenal	42	12	13	17	62	75	0.827	37
15	Newcastle United	42	14	9	19	50	63	0.794	37
16	Aston Villa	42	15	6	21	69	80	0.863	36

Source: World Football
Rules for classification: 1) Points; 2) Goal average; 3) Goals scored

== Results ==
Arsenal's score comes first

=== Legend ===
Win	Draw	Loss

=== Football League First Division ===
Date	Opponent	Venue	Result	Attendance	Scorers
21 August 1965	Stoke City	H	3–1		
25 August 1965	Northampton Town	A	1–1		
28 August 1965	Burnley	A	2–2		
4 September 1965	Chelsea	H	1–3		
7 September 1965	Nottingham Forest	A	1–0		
11 September 1965	Tottenham Hotspur	A	2–2		
14 September 1965	Nottingham Forest	H	1–0		
18 September 1965	Everton	A	1–3		
25 September 1965	Manchester United	H	4–2		
28 September 1965	Northampton Town	H	1–1		
2 October 1965	Newcastle United	A	1–0		
9 October 1965	Fulham	H	2–1		
16 October 1965	Blackpool	A	3–5		
23 October 1965	Blackburn Rovers	H	2–2		
30 October 1965	Leicester City	A	1–3		
6 November 1965	Sheffield United	H	6–2		
13 November 1965	Leeds United	A	0–2		
20 November 1965	West Ham United	H	3–2		
4 December 1965	Aston Villa	H	3–3		
11 December 1965	Liverpool	A	2–4		
27 December 1965	Sheffield Wednesday	A	0–4		
28 December 1965	Sheffield Wednesday	H	5–2		
1 January 1966	Fulham	A	0–1		
8 January 1966	Liverpool	H	0–1		
15 January 1966	Blackburn Rovers	A	1–2		
29 January 1966	Stoke City	A	3–1		
5 February 1966	Burnley	H	1–1		
19 February 1966	Chelsea	A	0–0		
5 March 1966	Blackpool	H	0–0		
8 March 1966	Tottenham Hotspur	H	1–1		
12 March 1966	Everton	H	0–1		
19 March 1966	Manchester United	A	1–2		
26 March 1966	Newcastle United	H	1–3		
5 April 1966	West Bromwich Albion	H	1–1		
11 April 1966	West Bromwich Albion	A	4–4		
16 April 1966	West Ham United	A	1–2		
20 April 1966	Sunderland	A	2–0		
23 April 1966	Sunderland	H	1–1		
25 April 1966	Sheffield United	A	0–3		
30 April 1966	Aston Villa	A	0–3		
5 May 1966	Leeds United	H	0–3		
7 May 1966	Leicester City	H	1–0		

=== FA Cup ===
Round	Date	Opponent	Venue	Result	Attendance	Scorers
R3	22 January 1966	Blackburn Rovers	A	0–3		

== Squad ==
Note: Flags indicate national team as defined under FIFA eligibility rules; some limited exceptions apply. Players may hold more than one non-FIFA nationality.

Pos.	Nation	Player
GK	SCO	Bob Wilson
GK	ENG	Tony Burns
GK	ENG	Jim Furnell
DF	ENG	David Court
DF	SCO	Ian Ure
DF	ENG	Roy Pack
DF	ENG	Peter Simpson
DF	NIR	Terry Neill
DF	ENG	Don Howe
DF	NIR	Billy McCullough
DF	ENG	Peter Storey
MF	SCO	Frank McLintock

Pos.	Nation	Player
MF	ENG	George Armstrong
MF	ENG	Jon Sammels
MF	SCO	Jimmy McGill
MF	WAL	Tom Walley
MF	ENG	Alan Skirton
FW	ENG	John Radford
FW	ENG	George Eastham
FW	SCO	Gordon Neilson
FW	ENG	Tommy Baldwin
FW	ENG	Joe Baker
