= 1963–64 Arsenal F.C. season =

English football club season

Arsenal
1963–64 season
- Chairman: Denis Hill-Wood
- Manager: Billy Wright
- First Division: 8th
- FA Cup: Fifth round
- Inter-Cities Fairs Cup: Second round
Home colours	Away colours

During the 1963–64 English football season, Arsenal F.C. competed in the Football League First Division.

== Final league table ==
Pos	Team	Pld	W	D	L	GF	GA	GAv	Pts
6	Sheffield Wednesday	42	19	11	12	84	67	1.254	49
7	Blackburn Rovers	42	18	10	14	89	65	1.369	46
8	Arsenal	42	17	11	14	90	82	1.098	45
9	Burnley	42	17	10	15	71	64	1.109	44
10	West Bromwich Albion	42	16	11	15	70	61	1.148	43

Source: World Football
Rules for classification: 1) Points; 2) Goal average; 3) Goals scored

== Results ==
Arsenal's score comes first

=== Legend ===
Win	Draw	Loss

=== Football League First Division ===
Date	Opponent	Venue	Result	Attendance	Scorers
24 August 1963	Wolverhampton Wanderers	H	1–3	50,302	
27 August 1963	West Bromwich Albion	H	3–2	35,467	
31 August 1963	Leicester City	A	2–7	29,620	
4 September 1963	West Bromwich Albion	A	0–4	26,598	
7 September 1963	Bolton Wanderers	H	4–3	26,016	
10 September 1963	Aston Villa	H	3–0	29,189	
14 September 1963	Fulham	A	4–1	34,910	
21 September 1963	Manchester United	H	2–1	56,776	
28 September 1963	Burnley	A	3–0	20,618	
2 October 1963	Everton	A	1–2	51,829	
5 October 1963	Ipswich Town	H	6–0	31,803	
9 October 1963	Stoke City	A	2–1	31,014	
15 October 1963	Tottenham Hotspur	H	4–4	67,857	
19 October 1963	Aston Villa	A	1–2	22,981	
26 October 1963	Nottingham Fores	H	4–2	41,121	
2 November 1963	Sheffield United	A	2–2	33,908	
5 November 1963	Birmingham City	H	4–1	23,499	
9 November 1963	West Ham United	H	3–3	52,742	
16 November 1963	Chelsea	A	1–3	47,050	
23 November 1963	Blackpool	H	5–3	33,847	
30 November 1963	Blackburn Rovers	A	1–4	21,000	
7 December 1963	Liverpool	H	1–1	40,551	
10 December 1963	Everton	H	6–0	33,644	
14 December 1963	Wolverhampton Wanderers	A	2–2	18,952	
21 December 1963	Leicester City	H	0–1	28,019	
28 December 1963	Birmingham City	A	4–1	23,329	
11 January 1964	Bolton Wanderers	A	1–1	14,651	
18 January 1964	Fulham	H	2–2	35,895	
1 February 1964	Manchester United	A	1–3	48,340	
8 February 1964	Burnley	H	3–2	30,863	
18 February 1964	Ipswich Town	A	2–1	17,486	
22 February 1964	Tottenham Hotspur	A	1–3	57,358	
29 February 1964	Stoke City	H	1–1	26,208	
7 March 1964	Nottingham Forest	A	0–2	18,416	
14 March 1964	Chelsea	H	2–4	25,513	
21 March 1964	West Ham United	A	1–1	28,170	
24 March 1964	Sheffield Wednesday	H	1–1	18,221	
28 March 1964	Sheffield United	H	1–3	21,001	
30 March 1964	Sheffield Wednesday	A	4–0	26,433	
4 April 1964	Blackpool	A	1–0	14,067	
11 April 1964	Blackburn Rovers	H	0–0	26,164	
18 April 1964	Liverpool	A	0–5	48,623	

=== FA Cup ===
Round	Date	Opponent	Venue	Result	Attendance	Scorers
R3	4 January 1964	Wolverhampton Wanderers	H	2–1	40,803	
R4	25 January 1964	West Bromwich Albion	A	3–3	49,703	
R4 R	29 January 1964	West Bromwich Albion	H	2–0	58,566	
R5	15 February 1964	Liverpool	H	0–1	61,295	

=== Inter-Cities Fairs Cup ===
Round	Date	Opponent	Venue	Result	Attendance	Scorers
R1 L1	25 September 1963	(Denmark) Staevnet	A	7–1	15,000	
R1 L2	22 October 1963	(Denmark) Staevnet	H	2–3	13,569	
R2 L1	13 November 1963	(Belgium) RFC Liège	H	1–1	22,003	
R2 L2	18 December 1963	(Belgium) RFC Liège	A	1–3	10,000	

== Squad ==
Note: Flags indicate national team as defined under FIFA eligibility rules; some limited exceptions apply. Players may hold more than one non-FIFA nationality.

Pos.	Nation	Player
GK	SCO	Bob Wilson
GK	ENG	Geoff Barnett
DF	NIR	Pat Rice
DF	SCO	Frank McLintock
DF	ENG	Peter Simpson
DF	ENG	Bob McNab
DF	NIR	Sammy Nelson
DF	WAL	John Roberts
MF	ENG	George Armstrong
MF	SCO	George Graham
MF	ENG	Jon Sammels

Pos.	Nation	Player
MF	ENG	Peter Storey
MF	SCO	Eddie Kelly
FW	ENG	Ray Kennedy
FW	ENG	John Radford
FW	ENG	Charlie George
FW	SCO	Peter Marinello
