= Frank McLintock =

Scottish footballer and manager

Frank McLintock MBE
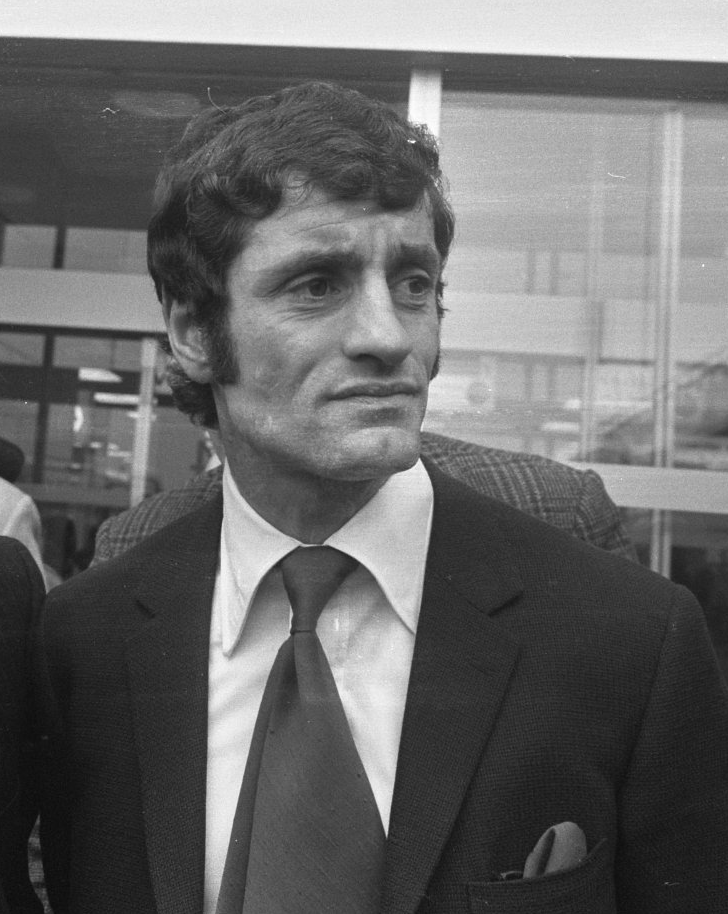
- McLintock in 1970

Personal information
- Full name: Francis McLintock
- Date of birth: 28 December 1939 (age 86)
- Place of birth: Glasgow, Scotland
- Height: 5 ft 9 in (1.75 m)
- Position: Centre-back

Youth career
- 1955–1956: Shawfield

Senior career*
Years	Team	Apps	(Gls)
1956–1964	Leicester City	168	(25)
1964–1973	Arsenal	314	(26)
1973–1977	Queens Park Rangers	127	(5)
Total		609	(56)

International career
1962–1964	SFA trial v SFL	2	(0)
1962	Scotland U23	1	(0)
1963–1971	Scotland	9	(1)

Managerial career
- 1977–1978: Leicester City
- 1984–1987: Brentford
- * Club domestic league appearances and goals

Francis McLintock MBE (born 28 December 1939) is a Scottish former footballer, football manager and businessman. He also worked as a sports agent and football pundit in his later life.

He began his career in Scottish Junior football with Shawfield, before earning a professional contract with English First Division club Leicester City in December 1956. He played in two FA Cup final defeats before he was sold to Arsenal for £80,000 in October 1964. He had a poor start to his career at Arsenal, though he did feature in two League Cup final defeats, but he found success at the club after being switched from right-half to centre-half in 1969. Appointed as captain he led the club to their first European trophy, the Inter-Cities Fairs Cup in 1970. The following season, 1970–71, he captained Arsenal to the Double, as they won the league and the FA Cup. He was sold to Queens Park Rangers in June 1973 for a fee of £25,000, and helped the club to finish as First Division runners-up in 1975–76, before he announced his retirement in May 1977. He scored a total of 66 goals in 766 league and cup games in a 20-year professional career, and won nine caps for Scotland in an eight-year international career.

McLintock was appointed manager of Leicester City in June 1977, but resigned in April 1978 with the club heading out of the First Division. After a spell coaching at QPR, he returned to management with Brentford in February 1984. He took the Bees to the 1985 Football League Trophy Final, before he resigned in January 1987. He later worked as assistant manager at Millwall, before becoming a sports agent and football pundit.

McLintock was appointed a Member of the Order of the British Empire (MBE) in the 1972 New Year Honours.

== Early life ==
McLintock was born in Sandyfaulds Street, Glasgow, and brought up in the Oatlands area of the Gorbals. He was the son of Catherine, a cleaner, and Archie McLintock, a casual labourer, and grew up in poverty with elder sister Jean. He was brought up Catholic and attended the local Catholic school, St Bonaventure's. He hated the sectarianism in Glasgow.

== Club career ==
McLintock started his semi-professional career at the age of 15 in the Scottish Juniors with his local club, Shawfield. He worked during the week as an apprentice painter and decorator. He soon began attracting interest from Scottish and English clubs, but decided to join an English club as he did not want to join a Scottish club only to be sent back on loan in the Junior leagues to gain experience.

=== Leicester City ===
He had a successful trial with Leicester City in December 1956, and was offered a part-time contract on his 17th birthday, with Shawfield receiving a £400 fee. At his mother's insistence, he continued his painting and decorating apprenticeship in Leicester, and would continue in the trade alongside playing football for the next five years. He found it easy to settle at the club as manager Dave Halliday and a total of 27 players and trainers at Filbert Street were Scottish. He was initially quite short but experienced a growth spurt, and gained extra leg muscles as he cycled to and from work and training. In fact McLintock's initial 5 ft 2 in (1.57 m) physique meant Halliday was keen to terminate his contract, but he was persuaded not to by coach Matt Gillies, who had witnessed the extra training McLintock put in every day. In his spare time he also trained with his left foot to become a two-footed player.

Gillies replaced Halliday as manager, and handed McLintock his debut eight games into the 1959–60 season, a 3–3 draw with Blackpool at Bloomfield Road. He kept his first-team place and picked up two-man of the match awards but after a mistimed tackle on Arsenal's Jackie Henderson he was initially diagnosed with extensive cartilage damage in his right knee and was scheduled in for a risky surgical procedure, but after demanding a second opinion he was diagnosed with a sprain and was sidelined for sixteen weeks. He returned to action in February after replacing new signing Ian White in the starting eleven, and scored his first goal for the Foxes in a 3–1 victory over Manchester United.

He was still struggling with his knee so missed the start of the 1960–61 season, but was returned to the starting line-up in September as City began to put a good set of results together, beating Manchester United 6–0, Arsenal home and away, and putting five goals past both West Ham United and Newcastle United. They went on to reach the 1961 FA Cup final against Tottenham Hotspur at Wembley Stadium; the day before the final McLintock painted a cellar as part of his painting and decorating job. An injury sustained by Len Chalmers early in the game meant that McLintock was shifted from right-half to fill in at right-back, and ten-men Leicester fell to a 2–0 defeat. In the summer he qualified as a painter and decorator, and immediately quit his job to focus on full-time football. Liverpool manager Bill Shankly made a transfer bid for him, but was rebuffed by the Leicester board, as was Leeds United manager Don Revie.

The 1961–62 campaign represented a step back for Leicester as they dropped eight places down to 14th place. Injury meant McLintock featured in only one European Cup Winners' Cup game, a 1–1 home draw with eventual winners Atlético Madrid, and prevented him from playing in the reverse fixture at the Estadio Metropolitano de Madrid, which Madrid won. In the summer, McLintock and goalkeeper Gordon Banks refused to sign new contracts at the club as they demanded a £10 a week raise to £30 a week – the pair were vilified in the local press to such an extent that McLintock went into the offices of the Leicester Mercury to forcibly put his case across to the sports editor – and eventually after three months they settled for £28 a week.

During the 1962–63 season he forged an effective half-back partnership with Colin Appleton and Ian King and was part of the revered "Ice Kings" team which won a series of games over the course of the brutal winter and came within nine points of winning the Football League. City were top of the First Division with five games to go but picked up only one point from these final five games. They also had an excellent run in the FA Cup to reach the 1963 FA Cup final, and were installed as favourites ahead of Manchester United. However McLintock and his teammates were poor on the day, and United won the match 3–1. Having been on course for the Double in April, Leicester ended May with a fourth-place finish and as runners-up in the cup.

Early in the 1964–65 season, McLintock was still unhappy with his contract at Leicester City and with what he perceived to be the club's lack of ambition. Despite the board relenting and offering him £80 a week to sign a new contract, he had already made up his mind to leave the club in favour of the chance to win "cups and caps" elsewhere and put in a formal transfer request.

=== Arsenal ===
In October 1964, McLintock was signed by Arsenal for a club record £80,000. He endured a poor début at Highbury, mishitting a back-pass to allow Nottingham Forest's John Barnwell – who ironically had been sold by Arsenal to finance McLintock's transfer – to score an easy goal. He found that manager Billy Wright had no identifiable system of play and McLintock soon regretted joining the club as his first four games all ended in defeat. He was in poor form in the 1964–65, 1965–66 and 1966–67 seasons but remained a regular first-team player as the Gunners struggled in mid-table. He insisted that the club change strip from red and white to all red so as to rid the team of the stigma of failing to live up to the highly successful red and white Arsenal teams of previous years; the experiment lasted for just the 1966–67 season before Arsenal reverted to red and white. Dissatisfied with the club's management, he put in a transfer request, which was denied by the board.

The new management duo of Bertie Mee and Dave Sexton began to slowly turn the team around, and Arsenal improved to ninth place by the 1967–68 campaign. After Sexton's departure, Don Howe was promoted to first-team coach and continued to improve the team's training methods. They reached the League Cup final at Wembley Stadium in 1968, but were beaten 1–0 by Leeds United, with Arsenal having an equalising goal ruled out after McLintock was judged to have fouled goalkeeper Gary Sprake. In the summer, he was named as Arsenal's Player of the Year and his initial four-year contract came to an end.

He was appointed as team captain for the 1968–69 season, taking over from Terry Neill, and signed a new four-year contract. For the second successive season, Arsenal reached the League Cup final, and as opponents Swindon Town were from the Third Division, McLintock expected that he would finally secure a trophy on his fourth visit to Wembley. However, Swindon won 3–1 after extra-time and McLintock blamed an influenza outbreak that affected him and five other teammates on the day and also blamed the Horse of the Year Show for ruining the pitch. The disappointment did not detract from their league form however, and they secured a place in the Inter-Cities Fairs Cup with a fourth-place finish.

He started the 1969–70 season at centre-half after initially filling in at the position for an injured Peter Simpson towards the end of the previous campaign; this in turn allowed George Graham to move back and play in midfield. McLintock and Simpson formed a highly effective centre-back partnership, and soon mastered the offside trap. In Europe, he missed the first two rounds due to injury, before returning to the starting eleven for victories over Rouen (France), FCM Bacău (Romania) and Ajax (Netherlands) to reach the final against Belgian club Anderlecht. Arsenal lost 3–1 in the first leg at Constant Vanden Stock Stadium as Anderlecht outplayed them. They turned the tie around at Highbury, though, and won the game 3–0 and the tie 4–3 to secure the club's first major trophy in 17 years.

He captained Arsenal to the Double in the 1970–71 season, in what was only the fourth time the feat had been accomplished in the history of the Football League. Aside from a 5–0 defeat to Stoke City, Arsenal built their success on a solid defence, and claimed ten 1–0 victories during the campaign. They secured the title with a 1–0 victory over North London derby rivals Tottenham Hotspur at White Hart Lane, Ray Kennedy scoring the winning goal. In the FA Cup final, they beat Liverpool 2–1 after extra-time, with Charlie George scoring the winning goal. To complete the campaign, McLintock was named as FWA Footballer of the Year.

The words used to describe us during the 1970–71 season – dull, sterile, unimaginative – reflect the generally dismissive tone levelled at us. Even the compliments we got – well organised, highly efficient, powerful – had the whiff of back-handed tributes.

— Arsenal were compared unfavourably with Spurs' Double-winning side of 1960–61.

McLintock later said that Arsenal were never the same force after Don Howe left to manage West Bromwich Albion in the summer of 1971, and that complacency crept into the squad. He felt that new coach Steve Burtenshaw was not tough enough on the squad and failed to keep the players focused. The pressing game was abandoned to suit new record signing Alan Ball, who was talented but did not fit the style of play that had brought the team success. McLintock held a clear the air meeting with the players in January, and asked the coaching staff not to attend, and though the team accepted that their standards had fallen the meeting still did not have the desired effect of improving performances. They exited the European Cup at the hands of Ajax, McLintock giving away a disputed penalty at the Olympic Stadium. They ended the 1971–72 league campaign in fifth place, six points behind champions Derby County. Arsenal did reach the FA Cup final, but were beaten 1–0 by Leeds United.

He was dropped midway through the 1972–73 campaign, and reacted badly to the news by exploding with anger towards Mee. He returned to the first team in February following an injury to Jeff Blockley, but was told by Mee his return was only temporary. He made a formal transfer request in March 1973, and in doing so gave up the chance to be granted a testimonial game for ten years' service to the club.

=== Queens Park Rangers ===
McLintock was signed by Queens Park Rangers in June 1973 for a fee of £25,000; he chose to join QPR ahead of West Bromwich Albion as he wanted to remain in the First Division. He spent the 1973–74 season in a centre-back partnership with Terry Mancini, in front of goalkeeper Phil Parkes and flanked by full-backs Dave Clement and Ian Gillard, and helped Rangers to an eighth-place finish in manager Gordon Jago's last season in charge.

Dave Sexton took charge from the 1974–75 campaign, and signed David Webb to replace Mancini who had moved on to Arsenal. McLintock enjoyed his time at Loftus Road and said that during the 1975–76 season, Rangers "were by miles the best football team in the country". By March 1976, Rangers were in a two-way battle for the league title with Liverpool, and with three games to go they could win the league with three victories. However, they were beaten by Norwich City and Liverpool won their remaining fixtures to become champions. He made 53 appearances in the 1976–77 campaign, before announcing his retirement in May 1977.

== International career ==
McLintock made his debut for Scotland in a 4–3 defeat to Norway on 4 June 1963, replacing Dave Mackay on 78 minutes. In his third appearance for Scotland, against Spain on 13 June, he scored one of the goals in a 6–2 win. However, he rarely featured after this game as Mackay, Paddy Crerand, John Greig, Bobby Murdoch, Pat Stanton and Billy Bremner were all preferred ahead of him at right-half.

"The majority of the press had disappeared so far up the Old Firm's arses that they could never be objective about English-based players and the Scottish Football Association (SFA) often treated us like the shit on their shoes."

— McLintock was heavily criticised by the Scottish press after many of his nine caps.

== Managerial career ==
=== Leicester City ===
McLintock joined his first club Leicester City as manager in June 1977, succeeding Jimmy Bloomfield who took the Foxes to an 11th-place finish in 1976–77. He sold striker Frank Worthington to Bolton Wanderers for £20,000 as the player needed a signing on fee and higher wages to avoid bankruptcy. He signed Alan Waddle in his place, who scored only one league goal for the club. He signed Eddie Kelly, David Webb, George Armstrong, Geoff Salmons and Lammie Robertson, all of whom were coming to the end of their careers. He spent £250,000 on Roger Davies, who also flopped at Filbert Street. City went through a spell where they had one win in 26 matches. He resigned in April 1978, with relegation into the Second Division all but confirmed.

He worked as a pundit for the BBC, before making his return to coaching when Terry Venables appointed him as a youth team coach at Queens Park Rangers in December 1982.

=== Brentford ===
He was appointed as manager of Brentford in February 1984, with the Bees second-from-bottom in the Third Division. His more successful signings included defender Terry Evans, midfielder Andy Sinton and forward Robbie Cooke. He took Brentford to the final of the Football League Trophy in 1985, where they were beaten 3–1 by Wigan Athletic. He resigned in January 1987, and was replaced by Steve Perryman.

He worked as assistant manager to John Docherty at Millwall from July 1987 to February 1990, helping the Lions to win promotion as champions of the Second Division in 1987–88.

== Later and personal life ==
McLintock found success as an after-dinner speaker, and as a pundit for BBC Radio and at Sky Sports, where he spent 12 years working with Rodney Marsh, George Best and Clive Allen. He also worked as a sports agent in the 1990s. In 2000, he helped form and began running H&M Security Services Ltd, with two partners, a company providing private security for a wealth of blue chip clients, only resigning as a director in 2019 on the death of his wife.

He bought a pub, and became an investor in prime residential property originally in his playing days his interest continued and he focused on the buy-to-let sector.

From 1963 to 2019, McLintock was married to Barbara Warner, a native of Leicester. The couple had four sons.

He has written two autobiographies: That's The Way The Ball Bounces in 1969 and True Grit in 2006.

== Career statistics ==
=== Club ===
Appearances and goals by club, season and competition
Club	Season	First Division		FA Cup		League Cup		Europe		Total	
Club	Season	Apps	Goals	Apps	Goals	Apps	Goals	Apps	Goals	Apps	Goals
Leicester City	1959–60	17	2	1	0	0	0	0	0	18	2
Leicester City	1960–61	34	1	10	0	2	0	0	0	46	1
Leicester City	1961–62	30	6	2	0	1	0	1	0	34	6
Leicester City	1962–63	42	4	6	0	2	0	0	0	50	4
Leicester City	1963–64	35	6	1	0	5	3	0	0	41	9
Leicester City	1964–65	10	6	0	0	1	0	0	0	11	6
Leicester City	Total	168	25	20	0	11	3	1	0	200	28
Arsenal	1964–65	35	2	2	0	0	0	0	0	27	2
Arsenal	1965–66	36	2	1	0	0	0	0	0	37	2
Arsenal	1966–67	40	9	3	0	2	2	0	0	45	11
Arsenal	1967–68	38	4	5	0	8	2	0	0	51	6
Arsenal	1968–69	37	1	4	0	7	0	0	0	48	1
Arsenal	1969–70	30	0	0	0	4	0	7	0	41	0
Arsenal	1970–71	42	5	9	0	5	0	7	1	63	6
Arsenal	1971–72	37	3	9	0	4	0	5	0	55	3
Arsenal	1972–73	29	0	3	1	4	0	0	0	36	1
Arsenal	Total	314	26	36	1	34	4	19	1	403	32
Queens Park Rangers	1973–74	26	1	6	0	3	0	0	0	35	1
Queens Park Rangers	1974–75	30	0	4	0	0	0	0	0	34	0
Queens Park Rangers	1975–76	35	2	2	0	4	0	0	0	41	2
Queens Park Rangers	1976–77	36	2	2	0	7	1	8	0	53	3
Queens Park Rangers	Total	127	5	14	0	14	1	8	0	163	6
Career total		609	56	70	1	59	8	28	1	766	66

=== International ===
Appearances and goals by national team and year
National team	Year	Apps	Goals
Scotland	1963	3	1
Scotland	1964	1	0
Scotland	1967	1	0
Scotland	1970	1	0
Scotland	1971	3	0
Total		9	1

== Honours ==
=== As a player ===
Leicester City

- FA Cup runner-up: 1960–61, 1962–63

Arsenal

- Football League First Division: 1970–71
- FA Cup: 1970–71; runner-up: 1971–72
- Inter-Cities Fairs Cup: 1969–70
- Football League Cup runner-up: 1967–68, 1968–69

Individual

- Arsenal Player of the Season: 1968
- FWA Footballer of the Year: 1971
- Rothmans Golden Boots Awards: 1971
- English Football Hall of Fame inductee: 2009
- Scottish Football Hall of Fame inductee: 2011

=== As a manager ===
Brentford

- Associate Members' Cup runner-up: 1984–85

== See also ==
- List of Scotland national football team captains
