= George Armstrong (footballer) =

English footballer and manager (1944–2000)

George "Geordie" Armstrong
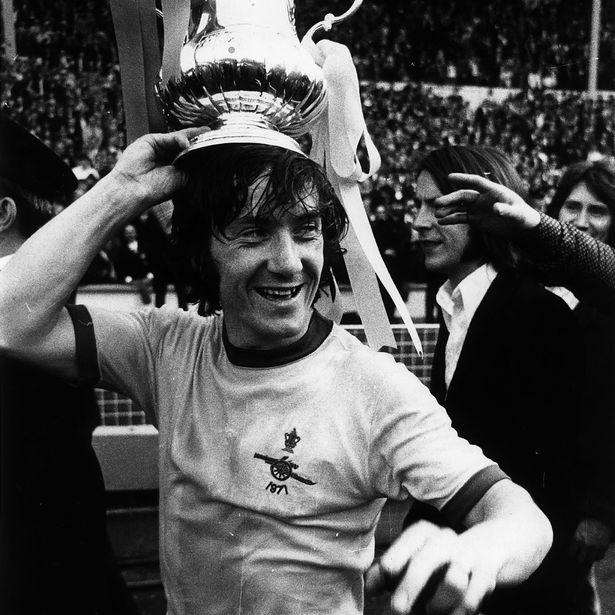
- Armstrong with the FA Cup trophy in 1971

Personal information
- Full name: George Armstrong
- Date of birth: 9 August 1944
- Place of birth: Hebburn, County Durham, England
- Date of death: 1 November 2000 (aged 56)
- Place of death: Hemel Hempstead, Hertfordshire, England
- Height: 5 ft 6 in (1.68 m)
- Position: Winger

Senior career*
Years	Team	Apps	(Gls)
1961–1977	Arsenal	500	(53)
1977–1978	Leicester City	15	(0)
1978–1979	Stockport County	34	(0)
1980–1981	Mjølner	33	(3)
Total		582	(56)

Managerial career
- 1980–1981: Mjølner
- 1983: Enderby Town
- 1984–1985: Worcester City
- 1988–1989: Kuwait
- * Club domestic league appearances and goals

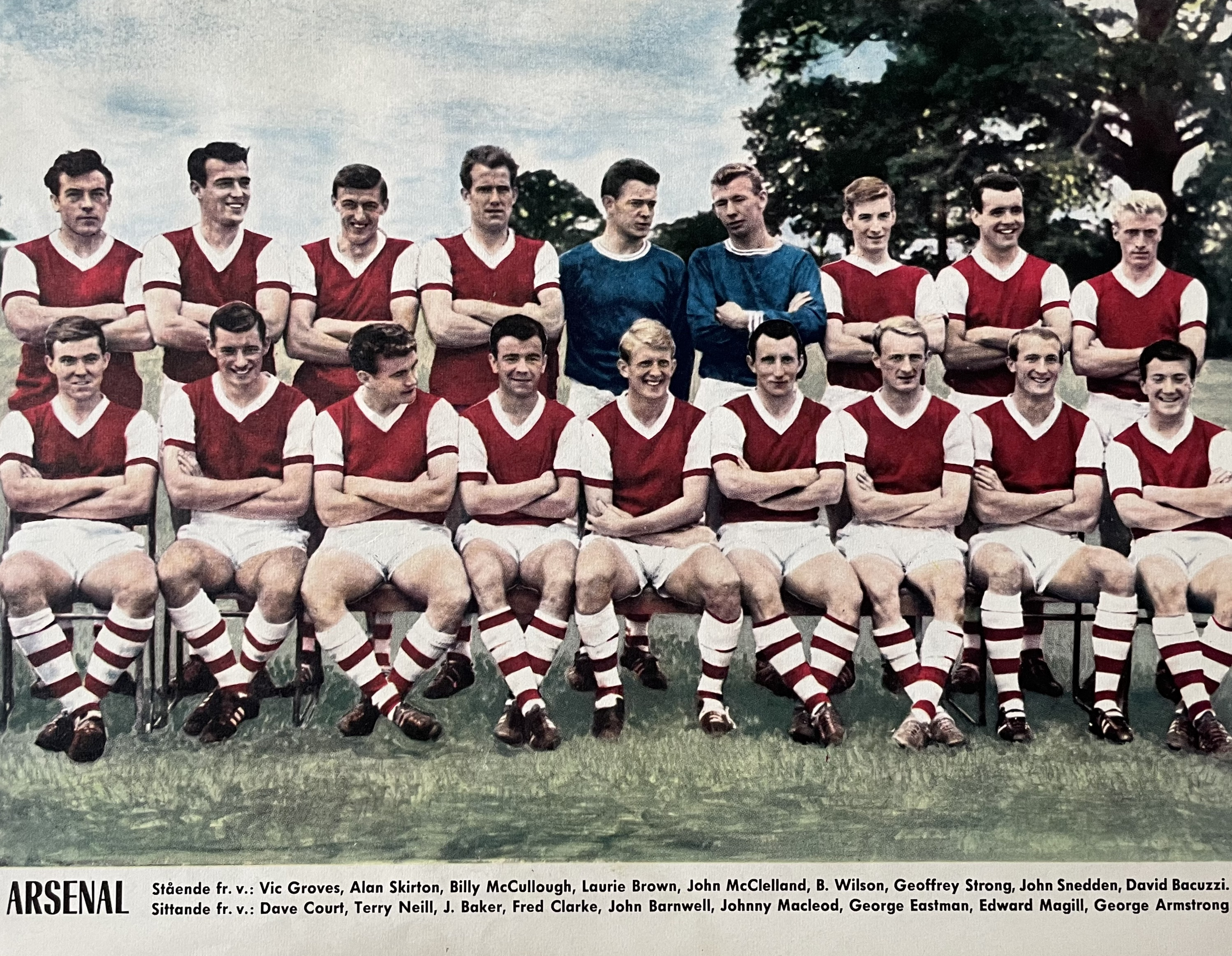
Arsenal F.C. in 1964, George Armstrong sits to the far right of the bench.

George "Geordie" Armstrong (9 August 1944 – 1 November 2000) was an English football player and coach, who was mostly associated with Arsenal. A winger, Armstrong made his Arsenal debut in 1962 at the age of 17 and went on to make 621 appearances – which was then an all-time club record – before he left Highbury in 1977. He spent a season each with Leicester City and Stockport County, and then took up coaching, both domestically and abroad. After a year as Kuwait national team manager, Armstrong returned to Arsenal as reserve-team coach in 1990, a post which he held for the remaining ten years of his life.

== Playing career ==
Armstrong was born in Kipling Avenue, Hebburn, County Durham. After leaving school he took up an apprenticeship as an electrician, at Hawthorne Leslie and played works football with his older brothers. He had an unsuccessful trial with Grimsby Town, and was on the books of Newcastle United as an amateur. The Newcastle United coaching staff fell out with Armstrong following a mix up which resulted in Armstrong missing one game, consequentially as a result of the fall out, the stubborn Newcastle staff would rarely pick him. He signed for Arsenal early in the 1961–62 season.

Armstrong arrived at Highbury as an inside forward but was soon switched to the wing. He made his senior debut while still only 17, against Blackpool on 24 February 1962 in a match that Arsenal won 1–0. Although he started out as understudy to Johnny MacLeod and Alan Skirton, by the 1963–64 season he had become a regular in the side, and in 1964–65 he missed only two matches.

Over time Armstrong became one of Arsenal's most consistent players, who was noted for the quality and accuracy of his crossing and corner kicks, as well as for his tireless running along the wing. He primarily played on the left, but was also effective on the right. Signed by George Swindin but maturing under Billy Wright's management, he was one of several players from the Wright era such as Jon Sammels and Peter Storey who became an integral part of successor Bertie Mee's Arsenal side.

After losing two successive League Cup finals, in 1967–68 and 1968–69, Armstrong was instrumental in the Gunners winning the 1969–70 Inter-Cities Fairs Cup, and was voted Arsenal's Player of the Year for 1970. He played in every match the following season as Arsenal completed the League and FA Cup double, and according to the club's website, "it was estimated that [he] had a hand in more than half of the goals scored in the Double season". These included Ray Kennedy's winning header in the last match of the season, against Tottenham Hotspur at White Hart Lane, that won Arsenal the League title.

Armstrong remained with the club through the 1970s, as Arsenal failed to win any further trophies after their Double win; he played at least thirty matches in each season he was at the club during that decade. However, after falling out with Mee's successor, Terry Neill, he moved to Leicester City in September 1977 for £15,000. He played only 14 League matches in his single season with the Foxes, and finished his career in England with Stockport County. In 1980-81 he was the player-manager for Mjølner, Norway, playing his last match against Bodø/Glimt on 5 July 1981.

Having spent fifteen full seasons at Arsenal, most of them as an ever-present, Armstrong set an all-time club record for appearances – 621 competitive first-team appearances, which included exactly 500 in the league; his record has since been overtaken only by David O'Leary and Tony Adams. He also scored 68 goals for Arsenal. His profile on the club's website suggests he was "one of the most accomplished players never to have won a full cap" for England, despite being capped at youth level and five times for the under-23 team; this was attributed to England manager Alf Ramsey's policy of not using wingers.

== Coaching career ==
After retiring as a player, Armstrong moved into coaching, and worked for clubs including Fulham, Aston Villa, Middlesbrough and Queens Park Rangers. He managed Enderby Town and Norwegian club FK Mjølner, and managed the Kuwaiti national team between 1988 and 1989. In 1990, before the Iraqi invasion of Kuwait, he returned to England, where he rejoined Arsenal as reserve team coach, a post which he retained for the rest of his life, despite the club's many managerial upheavals. During his time coaching at Arsenal Armstrong was responsible for bringing many young players through the ranks, including Steve Morrow, Ray Parlour and Paul Dickov.

== Death ==
On 31 October 2000, Armstrong collapsed after a brain haemorrhage while taking a training session. He died in Hemel Hempstead Hospital during the early hours of the following morning. He was survived by his wife, Marjorie, and their two children, Jill and Tom. A pitch at Arsenal's London Colney training ground has been named in his memory.

In March 2022 it was announced that his medals and awards, given to him throughout his career, would be sold at auction the following month. Memorabilia items were also auctioned in 2022.

== Playing statistics ==
Appearances and goals by club, season and competition
Club	Season	League			FA Cup		League Cup		Europe		Total	
Club	Season	Division	Apps	Goals	Apps	Goals	Apps	Goals	Apps	Goals	Apps	Goals
Arsenal	1961–62	First Division	4	1	0	0	—		—		4	1
Arsenal	1962–63	First Division	16	2	0	0	—		—		16	2
Arsenal	1963–64	First Division	28	3	4	2	—		3 (Note: Appearances in Inter-Cities Fairs Cup)	0	35	5
Arsenal	1964–65	First Division	40	4	2	1	—		—		42	5
Arsenal	1965–66	First Division	39	6	1	0	—		—		40	6
Arsenal	1966–67	First Division	40	7	4	1	3	0	—		47	8
Arsenal	1967–68	First Division	42	5	5	0	8	0	—		55	5
Arsenal	1968–69	First Division	29	5	3	1	6	2	—		38	8
Arsenal	1969–70	First Division	17	3	2	0	1	0	10	0	30	3
Arsenal	1970–71	First Division	42	7	9	0	5	0	8	1	64	8
Arsenal	1971–72	First Division	42	2	9	2	3	0	5 (Note: Appearances in European Cup)	1	59	5
Arsenal	1972–73	First Division	30	2	7	1	0	0	—		37	3
Arsenal	1973–74	First Division	41	0	3	0	1	0	—		45	0
Arsenal	1974–75	First Division	24	0	8	2	2	0	—		34	2
Arsenal	1975–76	First Division	29	4	1	0	0	0	—		30	4
Arsenal	1976–77	First Division	37	2	2	0	6	1	—		45	3
Arsenal	Total		500	53	60	10	35	3	26	2	621	68
Leicester City	1977–78	First Division	12	0	1	1	0	0	—		13	1
Leicester City	1978–79	Second Division	3	0	1	0	0	0	—		4	0
Leicester City	Total		15	0	2	1	0	0	—		17	1
Career total			515	53	62	11	35	3	26	2	638	69

== Honours ==
Arsenal

- Football League First Division: 1970–71
- FA Cup: 1970–71; runner-up: 1971–72
- Inter-Cities Fairs Cup: 1969–70
- Football League Cup runner-up: 1967–68, 1968–69

Individual

- Arsenal Player of the Season: 1969–70
