= 1964–65 Arsenal F.C. season =

English football club season

Arsenal
1964–65 season
- Chairman: Denis Hill-Wood
- Manager: Billy Wright
- First Division: 13th
- FA Cup: Fourth Round
Home colours	Away colours

During the 1964–65 English football season, Arsenal F.C. competed in the Football League First Division.

== Final league table ==
Pos	Team	Pld	W	D	L	GF	GA	GAv	Pts
11	Stoke City	42	16	10	16	67	66	1.015	42
12	Burnley	42	16	10	16	70	70	1.000	42
13	Arsenal	42	17	7	18	69	75	0.920	41
14	West Bromwich Albion	42	13	13	16	70	65	1.077	39
15	Sunderland	42	14	9	19	64	74	0.865	37

Source: World Football
Rules for classification: 1) Points; 2) Goal average; 3) Goals scored

== Results ==
Arsenal's score comes first

=== Legend ===
Win	Draw	Loss

=== Football League First Division ===
Date	Opponent	Venue	Result	Attendance	Scorers
22 August 1964	Liverpool	A	2–3	47,820	
25 August 1964	Sheffield Wednesday	H	1–1	35,590	
29 August 1964	Aston Villa	H	3–1	28,762	
2 September 1964	Sheffield Wednesday	A	1–2	22,555	
5 September 1964	Wolverhampton Wanderers	A	1–0	23,000	
8 September 1964	Blackburn Rovers	H	1–1	29,510	
12 September 1964	Sunderland	H	3–1	34,291	
16 September 1964	Blackburn Rovers	A	2–1	17,675	
19 September 1964	Leicester City	A	3–2	21,364	
26 September 1964	Chelsea	H	1–3	54,936	
6 October 1964	Nottingham Forest	H	0–3	35,041	
10 October 1964	Tottenham Hotspur	A	1–3	55,959	
17 October 1964	Burnley	H	3–2	24,962	
24 October 1964	Sheffield United	A	0–4	16,906	
31 October 1964	Everton	H	3–1	33,561	
7 November 1964	Birmingham City	A	3–2	20,210	
11 November 1964	Leeds United	A	1–3	38,620	
14 November 1964	West Ham United	H	0–3	36,026	
21 November 1964	West Bromwich Albion	A	0–0	20,869	
28 November 1964	Manchester United	H	2–3	59,627	
5 December 1964	Fulham	A	4–3	13,764	
12 December 1964	Liverpool	H	0–0	26,171	
19 December 1964	Aston Villa	A	1–3	16,000	
26 December 1964	Stoke City	H	3–2	27,663	
28 December 1964	Stoke City	A	1–4	20,491	
2 January 1965	Wolverhampton Wanderers	H	4–1	25,561	
16 January 1965	Sunderland	A	2–0	42,168	
23 January 1965	Leicester City	H	4–3	31,063	
6 February 1965	Chelsea	A	1–2	46,798	
13 February 1965	Leeds United	H	1–2	32,132	
20 February 1965	Fulham	H	2–0	22,101	
23 February 1965	Tottenham Hotspur	H	3–1	48,367	
27 February 1965	Burnley	A	1–2	12,841	
6 March 1965	Sheffield United	H	1–1	22,001	
13 March 1965	Nottingham Forest	A	0–3	24,497	
27 March 1965	West Ham United	A	1–2	24,000	
3 April 1965	West Bromwich Albion	H	1–1	18,797	
6 April 1965	Birmingham City	H	3–0	16,048	
16 April 1965	Blackpool	A	1–1	18,620	
19 April 1965	Blackpool	H	3–1	17,063	
24 April 1965	Everton	A	0–1	32,643	
26 April 1965	Manchester United	A	1–3	51,625	

=== FA Cup ===
Round	Date	Opponent	Venue	Result	Attendance	Scorers
R3	9 January 1965	Darlington	A	2–0	19,717	Armstrong, Radford
R4	30 January 1965	Peterborough United	A	1–2	30,056	Radford 43'

== Squad ==
Note: Flags indicate national team as defined under FIFA eligibility rules; some limited exceptions apply. Players may hold more than one non-FIFA nationality.

Pos.	Nation	Player
GK	SCO	Bob Wilson
GK	ENG	Geoff Barnett
DF	NIR	Pat Rice
DF	SCO	Frank McLintock
DF	ENG	Peter Simpson
DF	ENG	Bob McNab
DF	NIR	Sammy Nelson
DF	WAL	John Roberts
MF	ENG	George Armstrong
MF	SCO	George Graham
MF	ENG	Jon Sammels

Pos.	Nation	Player
MF	ENG	Peter Storey
MF	SCO	Eddie Kelly
FW	ENG	Ray Kennedy
FW	ENG	John Radford
FW	ENG	Charlie George
FW	SCO	Peter Marinello
