= 1967–68 Arsenal F.C. season =

English football club season

Arsenal
1967–68 season
- Chairman: Denis Hill-Wood
- Manager: Bertie Mee
- First Division: 9th
- FA Cup: Fifth round
- League Cup: Finalists
- Top goalscorer: League: George Graham (16); All: George Graham (21)
- Highest home attendance: 62,836 vs Tottenham Hotspur (16 September 1967)
- Lowest home attendance: 11,252 vs Sheffield Wednesday (30 April 1968)
Home colours	Away colours	Third colours

During the 1967–68 English football season, Arsenal Football Club competed in the Football League First Division. The team finished ninth in the league. Arsenal reached the final of the League Cup, losing 1–0 to Leeds United. It was the first of five major cup finals under manager Bertie Mee. Arsenal went out in the fifth round of the FA Cup to Birmingham City.

The only major transfer was the purchase of Bobby Gould in February. George Graham was again the top scorer in both the league and all competitions. Frank McLintock served as captain.

== Season summary ==
The 1967–68 season was the second of Bertie Mee's tenure as manager. From the beginning, Mee was looking to purchase a striker, as Arsenal had relied heavily on goals from midfielders. However, he did not make a purchase until midway through the season. In February 1968, Arsenal bought the hardworking goalscorer Bobby Gould for £90,000 from Coventry. Dave Sexton also departed from Arsenal's staff to manage Chelsea and Don Howe was promoted from reserve coach to chief coach.

Arsenal found their best form of the season in the League Cup. They easily reached the quarterfinals against Burnley. Interestingly, they faced the same team in the league just three days later, and as the League Cup tie required a replay, it meant Arsenal played Burnley three times in six days. After going 2–0 down in the first match, Arsenal responded admirably with goals from two George Graham and one from Frank McLintock, going ahead 3–2 by half. Arsenal went down to ten men when Bob McNab was sent off twelve minutes into the second half and Burnley equalized, leading to a replay. Tensions continued to boil in their league matchup and Arsenal finished the 0–1 loss with nine men. In the League Cup replay, McNab was replaced with Pat Rice. After squeaking past Huddersfield Town 3–2 in the home semifinal match, Arsenal beat them 3–1 away. They were headed to Wembley for the first time in sixteen years.

Arsenal faced Leeds United in the League Cup final. Leeds had won both their semifinal matchups and were twice recent-runners up of the First Division. They had also lost to Liverpool in the 1965 FA Cup Final. Arsenal, however, were to come in second on this occasion thanks to a Terry Cooper volley following a corner. Arsenal players protested as two of Leeds tallest players restricted Arsenal goalkeeper Jim Furnell by engaging in what Mee called "basketball." Arsenal were unable to respond to the Leeds goal due to their strong defense and lost 1–0 in the first major Cup final of the Mee era.

Following the League Cup final, Arsenal faced Birmingham City in the fifth round of the FA Cup. Arsenal lost the replay due to poor performance from goalkeeper Bob Wilson, letting in a last-minute goal.

Arsenal's form in the league was intermittent. However, they did end the season with five consecutive victories, securing a ninth-place finish.

== Final league table ==
Pos	Team	Pld	W	D	L	GF	GA	GAv	Pts	Qualification or relegation
7	Tottenham Hotspur	42	19	9	14	70	59	1.186	47	
8	West Bromwich Albion	42	17	12	13	75	62	1.210	46	Qualification for the European Cup Winners' Cup first round (Note: West Bromwich Albion qualified for the European Cup Winners' Cup as the 1967-68 FA Cup winners.)
9	Arsenal	42	17	10	15	60	56	1.071	44	
10	Newcastle United	42	13	15	14	54	67	0.806	41	Qualification for the Inter-Cities Fairs Cup first round (Note: Arsenal and Tottenham Hotspur were ineligible to participate in the Inter-Cities Fairs Cup as Chelsea had already qualified. Under the rules of the cup, only one team per city could participate. Newcastle United took their place as the highest-ranked team that hadn't already qualified for a European competition.)
11	Nottingham Forest	42	14	11	17	52	64	0.813	39	

Source: World Football
Rules for classification: 1) Points; 2) Goal average; 3) Goals scored

== Results ==
Arsenal's score comes first

=== Legend ===
Win	Draw	Loss

=== Football League First Division ===
Date	Opponent	Venue	Result	Attendance	Scorers
19 August 1967	Stoke City	H	2–0	27,144	
22 August 1967	Liverpool	A	0–2	52,033	
26 August 1967	Nottingham Forest	A	0–2	33,977	
28 August 1967	Liverpool	H	2–0	33,380	
2 September 1967	Coventry City	H	1–1	30,404	
6 September 1967	West Bromwich Albion	A	3–1	26,153	
9 September 1967	Sheffield United	A	4–2	14,939	
16 September 1967	Tottenham Hotspur	H	4–0	62,936	
23 September 1967	Manchester City	H	1–0	41,567	
30 September 1967	Newcastle United	A	1–2	33,377	
7 October 1967	Manchester United	A	0–1	60,201	
14 October 1967	Sunderland	H	2–1	30,864	
23 October 1967	Wolverhampton Wanderers	A	2–3	36,664	
28 October 1967	Fulham	H	5–3	29,867	
4 November 1967	Leeds United	A	1–3	31,492	
11 November 1967	Everton	H	2–2	36,371	
18 November 1967	Leicester City	A	2–2	28,150	
25 November 1967	West Ham United	H	0–0	42,029	
2 December 1967	Burnley	A	0–1	15,381	
16 December 1967	Stoke City	A	1–0	16,119	
23 December 1967	Nottingham Forest	H	3–0	32,512	
26 December 1967	Chelsea	A	2–1	51,672	
30 December 1967	Chelsea	H	1–1	47,157	
6 January 1968	Coventry City	A	1–1	32,839	
13 January 1968	Sheffield United	H	1–1	27,447	
20 January 1968	Tottenham Hotspur	A	0–1	57,886	
3 February 1968	Manchester City	A	1–1	42,392	
10 February 1968	Newcastle United	H	0–0	36,996	
24 February 1968	Manchester United	H	0–2	46,417	
16 March 1968	Wolverhampton Wanderers	H	0–2	25,983	
23 March 1968	Fulham	A	3–1	20,612	
29 March 1968	West Ham United	A	1–1	34,077	
6 April 1968	Everton	A	0–2	40,029	
10 April 1968	Southampton	A	0–2	23,207	
13 April 1968	Leicester City	H	2–1	19,108	
15 April 1968	Southampton	H	0–3	23,165	
20 April 1968	Sunderland	A	0–2	31,255	
27 April 1968	Burnley	H	2-0	15,278	
30 April 1968	Sheffield Wednesday	H	3–2	11,262	
4 May 1968	Sheffield Wednesday	A	2–1	24,500	
7 May 1968	Leeds United	H	4–3	24,053	
11 May 1968	West Bromwich Albion	H	2–1	25,896	

=== FA Cup ===
Round	Date	Opponent	Venue	Result	Attendance	Scorers
R3	27 January 1968	Shrewsbury Town	A	1–1	18,280	
R3 R	30 January 1968	Shrewsbury Town	H	2–0	41,958	
R4	17 February 1968	Swansea Town	A	1–0	32,796	
R5	9 March 1968	Birmingham City	H	1–1	45,515	
R5 R	12 March 1968	Birmingham City	A	1–2	51,586	

=== League Cup ===
Round	Date	Opponent	Venue	Result	Attendance	Scorers
R2	12 September 1967	Coventry City	A	2–1	22,605	
R3	11 October 1967	Reading	H	1–0	27,866	
R4	1 November 1967	Blackburn Rovers	H	2–1	20,044	
R5	29 November 1967	Burnley	A	3–3	16,033	
R5 R	5 December 1967	Burnley	H	2–1	36,570	
SF L1	17 January 1968	Huddersfield Town	H	3–2	39,986	
SF L2	6 February 1968	Huddersfield Town	A	3–1	27,312	
F	2 March 1968	Leeds United	N	0–1	97,877	

== Squad ==
Note: Flags indicate national team as defined under FIFA eligibility rules; some limited exceptions apply. Players may hold more than one non-FIFA nationality.

Pos.	Nation	Player
GK	SCO	Bob Wilson }
DF	SCO	Frank McLintock
DF	ENG	Peter Simpson
DF	ENG	Bob McNab
DF	NIR	Sammy Nelson
DF	WAL	John Roberts
MF	ENG	George Armstrong
MF	SCO	George Graham
