= 1968 Football League Cup final =

- Event: 1967–68 Football League Cup
Leeds United	Arsenal
1	0
- Date: 2 March 1968
- Venue: Wembley Stadium, London
- Referee: Les Hamer (Horwich)
- Attendance: 97,887

The 1968 Football League Cup final took place on 2 March 1968 at Wembley Stadium. It was the eighth final and the second to be played at Wembley. It was contested between Arsenal and Leeds United.

Terry Cooper scored the only goal of the game, hammering home a long-range goal after 20 minutes. It was the first major trophy of Don Revie's reign at Elland Road and started the most successful period in the club's history. Arsenal reached the League Cup final again the following year, only to lose to Swindon Town, but went on to win both domestic and European trophies in the following seasons.

== Match summary ==
The match day at Wembley was dull and overcast. In front of a crowd of 97,887, Leeds named a side which included several players with injury doubts, including Jack Charlton and Johnny Giles, both of whom made the starting eleven. Arsenal named their strongest side which included Frank McLintock and George Graham.

The match began with attacks from Leeds United, cleanly dealt with by Arsenal. Both teams played a long-ball game. For the first eighteen minutes, neither team could find a breakthrough. However, on a Leeds United corner, Eddie Gray placed the ball in the center of the box. Arsenal goalkeeper Jim Furnell had two players to contend with. The ball bounced out to the left side of the penalty area where Terry Cooper volleyed the ball in. Arsenal players protested that two of Leeds tallest players had impeded Furnell. Arsenal manager Bertie Mee later described the Leeds players' actions as "basketball." However, the goal stood, and Leeds went up 1–0.

Arsenal attacked the rest of the match, enjoying more possession than the leading side. However, they were unable to break through. Leeds had several more opportunities on the counterattack but also failed to convert. Leeds defense held, registering their fifth clean sheet in nine matches and the first major trophy of Don Revie's managerial career at Leeds. It was also the first major cup final for Arsenal under Bertie Mee.

== Match details ==
Leeds United	Arsenal

Leeds United; White shirts/White shorts and socks	1–0 (final score after 90 minutes)	Arsenal; Red shirts with White arms/White shorts/Red socks
Manager: (England) Don Revie Team: (Wales) Gary Sprake (GK) (England) Paul Reaney (England) Terry Cooper (Scotland) Billy Bremner (c) (England) Jack Charlton (England) Norman Hunter (England) Jimmy Greenhoff (Scotland) Peter Lorimer (England) Paul Madeley (Republic of Ireland) Johnny Giles (Scotland) Eddie Gray (substituted off); Substitute: (England) Rod Belfitt (substituted on) Scorer: Cooper 20'	Half-time: 1–0 Competition: Football League Cup (Final) Date: 15.00 BST Saturday 2 March 1968 Venue: Wembley Stadium, London Attendance: 97,887 Match rules: 90 minutes. 30 minutes extra-time if necessary. Match replayed if scores still level. One named substitute.	Manager: (England) Bertie Mee Team: (England) Jim Furnell (GK) (England) Peter Storey (England) Bob McNab (Scotland) Frank McLintock (c) (Scotland) Ian Ure (England) Peter Simpson (England) John Radford (England) David Jenkins (substituted off) (Scotland) George Graham (England) Jon Sammels (England) George Armstrong; Substitute: (Northern Ireland) Terry Neill (substituted on)

== Route to the final ==
Home teams listed first.

=== Leeds United ===
Round 2: Leeds United 3–1 Luton Town

Round 3: Leeds United 3–0 Bury

Round 4: Sunderland 0–2 Leeds United

Round 5: Leeds United 2–0 Stoke City

Semi-final:

1st Leg: Derby County 0–1 Leeds United
2nd Leg: Leeds United 3–2 Derby County
Agg Score: Leeds United 4–2 Derby County

=== Arsenal ===
Round 2: Coventry City 1–2 Arsenal

Round 3: Arsenal 1–0 Reading

Round 4: Arsenal 2–1 Blackburn Rovers

Round 5: Burnley 3–3 Arsenal

Replay: Arsenal 2–1 Burnley

Semi-final:

1st Leg: Arsenal 3–2 Huddersfield Town
2nd Leg: Huddersfield Town 1–3 Arsenal
Agg Score: Arsenal 6–3 Huddersfield Town

Leeds came into the final with much recent success but no silverwear to show for it. They had been Inter-Cities Fairs Cup finalists the previous season. They had been twice recent-runners up for the First Division and had lost to Liverpool in the 1965 FA Cup final. Leeds had conceded just three goals in six matches in their run-up to the final and their defence was on top again in a drab battle for the trophy against Arsenal. Leeds had won both their semifinal matchups and had gone 16 games unbeaten in all competitions, eight of those clean sheets.

Arsenal had languished in the mid-table and it was their first Wembley appearance since the 1952 FA Cup final. Arsenal found a touch match-up against Burnley in the quarterfinals of the League Cup. Interesting, they faced the same team in the league just three days later, and as the League Cup tie required a replay, it meant Arsenal played Burnley three times in six days. After going 2–0 down in the first match, Arsenal responded with two goals from George Graham and one from Frank McLintock, going ahead 3–2 by half. Arsenal went down to ten men when Bob McNab was sent off twelve minutes into the second half and Burnley equalized, leading to a replay. In the League Cup replay, McNab was replaced with Pat Rice. After squeaking past Huddersfield Town 3–2 in the home semifinal match, Arsenal beat them 3–1 away to reach the final at Wembley.

For both clubs, it was their first League Cup final.
