= Roy Pack =

English footballer

Personal information
- Full name: Roy James Pack
- Date of birth: 20 September 1946 (age 80)
- Place of birth: Stoke Newington, England
- Position: Full back

Youth career
- 1962–1965: Arsenal

Senior career*
Years	Team	Apps	(Gls)
1965–1966	Arsenal	1	(0)
1966–1969	Portsmouth	91	(0)
1969	Cape Town City		
1969–1970	Oxford United	0	(0)
Total		92	(0)
- * Club domestic league appearances and goals

Roy James Pack (born 20 September 1946) is an English former professional footballer who played as a full back.

== Career ==
Born in Stoke Newington, Pack joined Arsenal in 1962. He later played for Portsmouth, making 91 appearances in the Football League for them, before playing in South Africa with Cape Town City. He spent the 1969–70 season with Oxford United, but left without making an appearance, due to injury.
