= 1968–69 Arsenal F.C. season =

English football club season

Arsenal
1968–69 season
- Chairman: Denis Hill-Wood
- Manager: Bertie Mee
- First Division: 4th
- FA Cup: Fifth Round
- League Cup: Finalists
- Top goalscorer: League: John Radford (15); All: John Radford (19)
- Highest home attendance: 62,218 vs Manchester United (26 December 1968)
- Lowest home attendance: 23,891 vs Ipswich Town (19 February 1969)
Home colours	Away colours

During the 1968–69 English football season, Arsenal Football Club competed in the Football League First Division. The team finished fourth in the league, an improvement on their ninth place finish the previous season.

Arsenal reached the final of the League Cup, losing 3-1 to Swindon Town in extra time. It was their second League Cup loss in two years. Arsenal went out in the fifth round of the FA Cup to West Brom.

John Radford was the top scorer in both the league and all competitions. The previous season's top scorer, George Graham, began to feature in midfield. Frank McLintock served as captain.

== Season summary ==
Despite making several large bids, Arsenal did not bring in any major new players for the 1968-69 season. The team began the season with a victory at White Hart Lane, their first in eleven seasons. It kickstarted their best start to a season in twenty years, going eleven games unbeaten until a defeat at Elland Road.

Much of the 1968-69 season was represented in player growth. Bob Wilson, a former schoolteacher, improved markedly between the sticks. Peter Simpson became a more complete central defender, and manager Bertie Mee began to experiment with playing George Graham in midfield as his lack of pace was affecting his ability to play as a forward.

In the League Cup, Arsenal once again reached the final, having shown their mettle in the semifinals against Tottenham, with Radford scoring a crucial goal in the last minutes of the encounter at Highbury. Arsenal were to face Third Division side Swindon Town in the final. Wembley was in poor condition due to the International Horse of the Year Show, compounded by heavy rainfall. Upon match day, eight Arsenal players had just recovered from the flu while several Swindon players were recovering from injury. Arsenal, after a league record of letting in 18 goals in 30 games, conceded to Swindon in the 34th minute. The team recovered, playing against Swindon's second-half 9-1-0 formation, four minutes before time. Bobby Gould scored the equalizer. The game went into extra time, the pitch laden with mud. Don Rogers scored twice for Swindon in extra time and Arsenal lost their second League Cup final in two years.

Arsenal finished the season in fourth place, in part due to their strong defensive record and a string of 6 consecutive wins with only one goal conceded during the middle of the season.

== Final league table ==
Pos	Team	Pld	W	D	L	GF	GA	GAv	Pts	Qualification or relegation
2	Liverpool	42	25	11	6	63	24	2.625	61	Qualification for the Inter-Cities Fairs Cup first round
3	Everton	42	21	15	6	77	36	2.139	57	
4	Arsenal	42	22	12	8	56	27	2.074	56	Qualification for the Inter-Cities Fairs Cup first round (Note: Everton were ineligible to participate in the Inter-Cities Fairs Cup as Liverpool had already qualified. Under the rules of the cup, only one team per city could participate. Arsenal took their place as the highest-ranked team that had not already qualified for a European competition.)
5	Chelsea	42	20	10	12	73	53	1.377	50	
6	Tottenham Hotspur	42	14	17	11	61	51	1.196	45	

Source: World Football
Rules for classification: 1) Points; 2) Goal average; 3) Goals scored

== Results ==
Arsenal's score comes first

=== Legend ===
Win	Draw	Loss

=== Football League First Division ===
Date	Opponent	Venue	Result	Attendance	Scorers
10 August 1968	Tottenham Hotspur	A	2–1	56,280	
13 August 1968	Leicester City	H	3–0	32,164	
17 August 1968	Liverpool	H	1–1	43,535	
21 August 1968	Wolverhampton Wanderers	A	0–0	36,006	
24 August 1968	Ipswich Town	A	2–1	25,825	
27 August 1968	Manchester City	H	4–1	40,776	
31 August 1968	Queen's Park Rangers	H	2–1	44,407	
7 September 1968	Southampton	A	2–1	25,126	
14 September 1968	Stoke City	H	1–0	28,275	
21 September 1968	Leeds United	A	0–2	39,946	
28 September 1968	Sunderland	H	0–0	35,277	
5 October 1968	Manchester United	A	0–0	61,843	
9 October 1968	Manchester City	A	1–1	33,830	
12 October 1968	Coventry City	H	2–1	35,240	
19 October 1968	West Bromwich Albion	A	0–1	35,624	
26 October 1968	West Ham United	H	0–0	59,533	
9 November 1968	Newcastle United	H	0–0	34,168	
16 November 1968	Nottingham Forest	A	2–0	24,550	
23 November 1968	Chelsea	H	0–1	45,588	
30 November 1968	Burnley	A	1–0	16,264	
7 December 1968	Everton	H	3–1	40,108	
14 December 1968	Coventry City	A	1–0	27,332	
21 December 1968	West Bromwich Albion	H	2–0	30,785	
26 December 1968	Manchester United	H	3–0	62,300	
11 January 1969	Sheffield Wednesday	H	2–0	39,008	
18 January 1969	Newcastle United	A	1–2	34,227	
1 February 1969	Nottingham Forest	H	1–1	35,585	
15 February 1969	Burnley	H	2–0	27,614	
18 February 1969	Ipswich Town	H	0–2	23,891	
1 March 1969	Sheffield Wednesday	A	5–0	21,436	
22 March 1969	Queen's Park Rangers	A	1–0	23,076	
24 March 1969	Tottenham Hotspur	H	1–0	43,972	
29 March 1969	Southampton	H	0–0	28,740	
31 March 1969	Liverpool	A	1–1	44,843	
5 April 1969	Sunderland	A	0–0	23,214	
7 April 1969	Wolverhampton Wanderers	H	3–1	31,011	
8 April 1969	Leicester City	A	0–0	35,573	
12 April 1969	Leeds United	H	1–2	44,715	
14 April 1969	Chelsea	A	1–2	38,905	
19 April 1969	Stoke City	A	3–1	14,996	
21 April 1969	West Ham United	A	2–1	34,941	
29 April 1969	Everton	A	0–1	39,689	

=== FA Cup ===
Round	Date	Opponent	Venue	Result	Attendance	Scorers
R3	4 January 1969	Cardiff City	A	0–0	55,316	
R3 R	7 January 1969	Cardiff City	H	2–0	52,681	
R4	25 January 1969	Charlton Athletic	H	2–0	55,760	
R5	12 February 1969	West Bromwich Albion	A	0–1	50,354	

=== League Cup ===
Round	Date	Opponent	Venue	Result	Attendance	Scorers
R2	4 September 1968	Sunderland	H	1–0	28,460	Neill 46'
R3	25 September 1968	Scunthorpe United	A	6–1	17,450	
R4	15 October 1968	Liverpool	H	2–1	39,299	
R5	29 October 1968	Blackpool	H	5–1	32,321	
SF L1	20 November 1968	Tottenham Hotspur	H	1–0	55,237	Radford
SF L2	4 December 1968	Tottenham Hotspur	A	1–1	56,923	
F	15 March 1969	Swindon Town	N	1–3	98,189	Gould

== Squad ==
Note: Flags indicate national team as defined under FIFA eligibility rules; some limited exceptions apply. Players may hold more than one non-FIFA nationality.

Pos.	Nation	Player
GK	SCO	Bob Wilson
GK	ENG	Geoff Barnett
DF	NIR	Pat Rice
DF	SCO	Frank McLintock
DF	ENG	Peter Simpson
DF	ENG	Bob McNab
DF	NIR	Sammy Nelson
DF	WAL	John Roberts
MF	ENG	George Armstrong
MF	SCO	George Graham
MF	ENG	Jon Sammels

Pos.	Nation	Player
MF	ENG	Peter Storey
MF	SCO	Eddie Kelly
FW	ENG	Ray Kennedy
FW	ENG	John Radford
FW	ENG	Charlie George
FW	SCO	Peter Marinello
