= 1972–73 Arsenal F.C. season =

English football club season

Arsenal
1972–73 season
- Chairman: Denis Hill-Wood
- Manager: Bertie Mee
- First Division: 2nd
- FA Cup: Fourth place
- League Cup: Quarter-finals
- Top goalscorer: League: John Radford (15); All: John Radford (18)
- Highest home attendance: 56,194 vs Manchester United (6 January 1973)
- Lowest home attendance: 27,199 vs West Bromwich Albion F.C. (16 December 1972)
Home colours	Away colours

The 1972–73 season was Arsenal Football Club's 47th consecutive season in the Football League First Division. Arsenal were runners-up to Liverpool in the league. They were knocked out of the League Cup in the quarterfinals by Norwich and the FA Cup in the semifinals by Sunderland.

John Radford was the top scorer in both the league and in all competitions. Frank McLintock served as captain.

1972-73 was the last season under manager Bertie Mee in which Arsenal challenged for silverware.

== Season summary ==
In the summer of 1972, double-winners Charlie George and Eddie Kelly were put on the transfer list. Though neither left the club, it represented some of the internal struggles of the club at the time, as George and Kelly felt under-rewarded compared to more senior players. Dressing room tensions continued throughout the season, as Mee saw captain Frank McLintock's influence over the dressing room as a challenge to his own authority. Mee also continued to struggle with the absence of Don Howe who had left the previous season to manage West Brom.

Mee made one major purchase in October 1972, buying centre-back Jeff Blockley from Coventry for £200,000. Blockley, who received his first cap for England days after his move to Highbury, was considered the long-term replacement for McLintock. However, this view was not shared by McLintock himself or most of the Arsenal dressing room.

In league play, Mee attempted to respond to the regular criticism that "boring old" Arsenal failed to entertain. Mee attempted to make stylistic changes to play "total football," a style far from their regular long-ball game and unsuited to the English Game. Alan Ball, a player comfortable with possession and who wanted more midfield involvement, was essential to such an approach. However, instead of success, the style led to a 5-0 loss to Derby in the league and a 0-3 home defeat to Norwich, knocking Arsenal out of the League Cup. Returning to their standard tactics, Arsenal went 15 games without defeat. By early 1973, they were nearing Liverpool in the title race. However, they ended up finishing three points behind the league leaders.

In the FA Cup, Arsenal progressed over Leicester City, Bradford City, Carlisle United, and Chelsea before being drawn against Second Division Sunderland in the semifinals. Mee chose to start the dynamic George over the hardworking John Radford. Sunderland scored thanks to a Blockley mistake; he was then roundly criticized for his poor performance, as he played without being fully fit. He was then substituted at half for Radford. Although Arsenal hoped to recover in the second half, Sunderland doubled their lead through Billy Hughes. Arsenal's sole consolation came in the 85th minute from George. Out of the FA Cup, Arsenal lost the third place match 1-3 to Wolves.

After the season's lackluster results, Mee was convinced he had to rebuild Arsenal and let several key players go at the end of the season, including McLintock and George Graham. The 1972/73 season was the beginning of the end for Mee as Arsenal began to descend into mediocrity.

== Final league table ==
Pos	Team	Pld	W	D	L	GF	GA	GAv	Pts	Qualification or relegation
1	Liverpool (C)	42	25	10	7	72	42	1.714	60	Qualification for the European Cup first round
2	Arsenal	42	23	11	8	57	43	1.326	57	
3	Leeds United	42	21	11	10	71	45	1.578	53	Qualification for the UEFA Cup first round
4	Ipswich Town	42	17	14	11	55	45	1.222	48	Qualification for the UEFA Cup first round
5	Wolverhampton Wanderers	42	18	11	13	66	54	1.222	47	Qualification for the UEFA Cup first round

Source: World Football
Rules for classification: 1) Points; 2) Goal average; 3) Goals scored
(C) Champions

== Results ==
Arsenal's score comes first

=== Legend ===
Win	Draw	Loss

=== Football League First Division ===
Date	Opponent	Venue	Result	Attendance	Scorers
12 August 1972	Leicester City	A	1–0	28,003	
15 August 1972	Wolverhampton Wanderers	H	5–2	38,524	
19 August 1972	Stoke City	H	2–0	42,146	
22 August 1972	Coventry City	A	1–1	24,670	
26 August 1972	Manchester United	A	0–0	48,108	
29 August 1972	West Ham United	H	1–0	43,802	
2 September 1972	Chelsea	H	1–1	46,675	
9 September 1972	Newcastle United	A	1–2	23,878	
16 September 1972	Liverpool	H	0–0	47,597	
23 September 1972	Norwich City	A	2–3	32,273	
26 September 1972	Birmingham City	H	2–0	30,003	
30 September 1972	Southampton	H	1–0	34,694	
7 October 1972	Sheffield United	A	0–1	24,478	
14 October 1972	Ipswich Town	H	1–0	34,196	
21 October 1972	Crystal Palace	A	3–2	35,865	
28 October 1972	Manchester City	H	0–0	45,536	
4 November 1972	Coventry City	H	0–2	33,699	
11 November 1972	Wolverhampton Wanderers	A	3–1	25,988	
18 November 1972	Everton	H	1–0	35,738	
25 November 1972	Derby County	A	0–5	31,034	
2 December 1972	Leeds United	H	2–1	39,108	
9 December 1972	Tottenham Hotspur	A	2–1	47,505	
16 December 1972	West Bromwich Albion	H	2–1	30,199	
23 December 1972	Birmingham City	A	1–1	32,721	
26 December 1972	Norwich City	H	2–0	39,038	
30 December 1972	Stoke City	A	0–0	24,586	
6 January 1973	Manchester United	H	3–1	56,194	
20 January 1973	Chelsea	A	1–0	36,292	
27 January 1973	Newcastle United	H	2–2	37,906	
10 February 1973	Liverpool	A	2–0	49,898	
17 February 1973	Leicester City	H	1–0	42,047	
28 February 1973	West Bromwich Albion	A	0–1	29,308	
3 March 1973	Sheffield United	H	3–2	33,346	
10 March 1973	Ipswich Town	A	2–1	34,636	
24 March 1973	Manchester City	A	2–1	32,031	
26 March 1973	Crystal Palace	H	1–0	41,879	
31 March 1973	Derby County	H	0–1	45,217	
14 April 1973	Tottenham Hotspur	H	1–1	50,863	
21 April 1973	Everton	A	0–0	42,888	
23 April 1973	Southampton	A	2–2	23,919	
28 April 1973	West Ham United	A	2–1	37,366	
9 May 1973	Leeds United	A	1–6	25,088	

=== FA Cup ===
Round	Date	Opponent	Venue	Result	Attendance	Goalscorers
R3	13 January 1973	Leicester City	H	2–2	36,433	
R3 R	17 January 1973	Leicester City	A	2–1	32,973	
R4	3 February 1973	Bradford City	H	2–0	40,407	
R5	24 February 1973	Carlisle United	A	2–1	23,922	
R6	17 March 1973	Chelsea	A	2–2	37,685	
R6 R	20 March 1973	Chelsea	H	2–1	62,746	
SF	7 April 1973	Sunderland	N	1–2	55,000	
3rd	18 August 1973	Wolverhampton Wanderers	H	1–3	21,038	

=== League Cup ===
Round	Date	Opponent	Venue	Result	Attendance	Goalscorers
R2	5 September 1972	Everton	H	1–0	35,230	
R3	3 October 1972	Rotherham United	H	5–0	25,241	
R4	31 October 1972	Sheffield United	A	2–1	20,128	
QF	21 November 1972	Norwich City	H	0–3	37,671	

== Squad ==
Note: Flags indicate national team as defined under FIFA eligibility rules; some limited exceptions apply. Players may hold more than one non-FIFA nationality.

Pos.	Nation	Player
GK	SCO	Bob Wilson
GK	ENG	Geoff Barnett
DF	NIR	Pat Rice
DF	SCO	Frank McLintock
DF	ENG	Peter Simpson
DF	ENG	Bob McNab
DF	NIR	Sammy Nelson
DF	WAL	John Roberts
DF	ENG	Brendon Batson
DF	ENG	Jeff Blockley

Pos.	Nation	Player
MF	ENG	George Armstrong
MF	SCO	George Graham
MF	ENG	Peter Storey
MF	ENG	Alan Ball
MF	SCO	Eddie Kelly
FW	ENG	Ray Kennedy
FW	ENG	John Radford
FW	ENG	Charlie George
FW	SCO	Peter Marinello

== Top scorers ==
First Division

- John Radford - 15
- Alan Ball - 10
- Ray Kennedy - 9

Football League Cup

- John Radford - 3
- Peter Storey - 2
- Charlie George - 2

FA Cup

- Alan Ball - 4
- Bob McNab - 2
