= 1961–62 Arsenal F.C. season =

English football club season

Arsenal
1961–62 season
- Chairman: Bracewell Smith
- Manager: George Swindin
- First Division: 10th
- FA Cup: Fourth Round

During the 1961–62 English football season, Arsenal F.C. competed in the Football League First Division.

== Final league table ==
Pos	Team	Pld	W	D	L	GF	GA	GAv	Pts
8	West Ham United	42	17	10	15	76	82	0.927	44
9	West Bromwich Albion	42	15	13	14	83	67	1.239	43
10	Arsenal	42	16	11	15	71	72	0.986	43
11	Bolton Wanderers	42	16	10	16	62	66	0.939	42
12	Manchester City	42	17	7	18	78	81	0.963	41

Source: World Football
Rules for classification: 1) Points; 2) Goal average; 3) Goals scored

== Results ==
Arsenal's score comes first

=== Legend ===
Win	Draw	Loss

=== Football League First Division ===
Date	Opponent	Venue	Result	Attendance	Scorers
19 August 1961	Burnley	H	2–2	42,858	
23 August 1961	Leicester City	A	1–0	29,396	
26 August 1961	Tottenham Hotspur	A	3–4	59,371	
29 August 1961	Leicester City	H	4–4	35,055	
2 September 1961	Bolton Wanderers	A	1–2	18,414	
9 September 1961	Manchester City	H	3–0	41,478	
16 September 1961	West Bromwich Albion	A	0–4	26,498	
20 September 1961	Sheffield Wednesday	A	1–1	35,903	
23 September 1961	Birmingham City	H	1–1	31,749	
30 September 1961	Everton	A	1–4	43,389	
7 October 1961	Blackpool	H	3–0	41,166	
14 October 1961	Blackburn Rovers	A	0–0	14,000	
21 October 1961	Manchester United	H	5–1	54,245	
28 October 1961	Cardiff City	A	1–1	25,400	
4 November 1961	Chelsea	H	0–3	37,590	
11 November 1961	Aston Villa	A	1–3	24,200	
14 November 1961	Sheffield Wednesday	H	1–0	19,331	
18 November 1961	Nottingham Forest	H	2–1	34,317	
25 November 1961	Wolverhampton Wanderers	A	3–2	28,882	
2 December 1961	West Ham United	H	2–2	47,216	
9 December 1961	Sheffield United	A	1–2	19,213	
16 December 1961	Burnley	A	2–0	22,887	
23 December 1961	Tottenham Hotspur	H	2–1	63,440	
26 December 1961	Fulham	H	1–0	32,969	
13 January 1962	Bolton Wanderers	H	1–2	33,351	
20 January 1962	Manchester City	A	2–3	20,414	
3 February 1962	West Bromwich Albion	H	0–1	29,597	
10 February 1962	Birmingham City	A	0–1	27,797	
24 February 1962	Blackpool	A	1–0	13,728	
3 March 1962	Blackburn Rovers	H	0–0	25,744	
17 March 1962	Cardiff City	H	1–1	25,059	
24 March 1962	Chelsea	A	3–2	31,016	
31 March 1962	Aston Villa	H	4–5	20,107	
7 April 1962	Nottingham Forest	A	1–0	21,129	
11 April 1962	Fulham	A	2–5	26,517	
14 April 1962	Wolverhampton Wanderers	H	3–1	24,367	
16 April 1962	Manchester United	A	3–2	24,788	
20 April 1962	Ipswich Town	A	2–2	30,649	
21 April 1962	West Ham United	A	3–3	31,912	
23 April 1962	Ipswich Town	H	0–3	44,694	
28 April 1962	Sheffield United	H	2–0	18,761	
1 May 1962	Everton	H	2–3	20,030	

=== FA Cup ===
Round	Date	Opponent	Venue	Result	Attendance	Scorers
R3	6 January 1962	Bradford City	H	3–0	40,232	
R4	31 January 1962	Manchester United	A	0–1	54,082	
