= 1962–63 Arsenal F.C. season =

English football club season

Arsenal
1962–63 season
- Chairman: Denis Hill-Wood
- Manager: Billy Wright
- First Division: 7th
- FA Cup: Fifth Round
Home colours	Away colours

During the 1962–63 English football season, Arsenal F.C. competed in the Football League First Division.

The Big Freeze of 1962–1963, was one of the coldest winters on record Football matches in the English leagues suffered because of the severe effects of the winter weather. Some matches in the FA Cup were rescheduled ten or more times. Matches in the fifth and sixth rounds, scheduled for 16 February and 9 March respectively, were played on 16 and 30 March. A board known as the Pools Panel was set up to adjudicate postponed matches to provide the football pool results. From 15 December to 9 February, Arsenal completed no league matches. The delays occurred before under-soil heating became widespread at major venues. When the thaw arrived, a backlog of fixtures had to be hastily determined. The Football League season was extended by four weeks from its original finishing date of 27 April. The final league fixtures took place one day before the rescheduled FA Cup final.

== Final league table ==
Pos	Team	Pld	W	D	L	GF	GA	GAv	Pts	Qualification or relegation
5	Wolverhampton Wanderers	42	20	10	12	93	65	1.431	50	
6	Sheffield Wednesday	42	19	10	13	77	63	1.222	48	Qualification for the Inter-Cities Fairs Cup first round
7	Arsenal	42	18	10	14	86	77	1.117	46	Qualification for the Inter-Cities Fairs Cup first round
8	Liverpool	42	17	10	15	71	59	1.203	44	
9	Nottingham Forest	42	17	10	15	67	69	0.971	44	

Source: World Football
Rules for classification: 1) Points; 2) Goal average; 3) Goals scored

== Results ==
Arsenal's score comes first

=== Legend ===
Win	Draw	Loss

=== Football League First Division ===
Date	Opponent	Venue	Result	Attendance	Scorers
18 August 1962	Leyton Orient	A	2–1	26,300	
21 August 1962	Birmingham City	H	2–0	34,004	
25 August 1962	Manchester United	H	1–3	62,308	
29 August 1962	Birmingham City	A	2–2	27,135	
1 September 1962	Burnley	A	1–2	26,231	
4 September 1962	Aston Villa	H	1–2	33,861	
8 September 1962	Sheffield Wednesday	H	1–2	31,115	
10 September 1962	Aston Villa	A	1–3	36,705	
15 September 1962	Fulham	A	3–1	31,442	
22 September 1962	Leicester City	H	1–1	31,291	
29 September 1962	Bolton Wanderers	A	0–3	16,572	
6 October 1962	Tottenham Hotspur	A	4–4	61,749	
13 October 1962	West Ham United	H	1–1	49,000	
27 October 1962	Wolverhampton Wanderers	H	5–4	43,002	
3 November 1962	Blackburn Rovers	A	5–5	15,400	
10 November 1962	Sheffield United	H	1–0	25,503	
14 November 1962	Liverpool	A	1–2	38,452	
17 November 1962	Nottingham Forest	A	0–3	24,804	
24 November 1962	Ipswich Town	H	3–1	25,056	
1 December 1962	Manchester City	A	4–2	25,454	
8 December 1962	Blackpool	H	2–0	23,767	
15 December 1962	Leyton Orient	H	2–0	29,075	
9 February 1963	Leicester City	A	0–2	26,320	
16 February 1963	Bolton Wanderers	A	3–2	25,204	
23 February 1963	Tottenham Hotspur	H	2–3	59,980	
2 March 1963	West Ham United	A	4–0	31,967	
9 March 1963	Liverpool	H	2–2	30,246	
23 March 1963	Blackburn Rovers	H	3–1	21,467	
26 March 1963	Everton	H	4–3	38,061	
30 March 1963	Ipswich Town	A	1–1	16,686	
6 April 1963	Nottingham Forest	H	0–0	25,134	
8 April 1963	Wolverhampton Wanderers	A	0–1	18,593	
12 April 1963	West Bromwich Albion	H	3–2	30,619	
13 April 1963	Sheffield United	A	3–3	21,487	
15 April 1963	West Bromwich Albion	A	2–1	22,697	
20 April 1963	Manchester City	H	2–3	20,539	
24 April 1963	Everton	A	1–1	56,034	
27 April 1963	Blackpool	A	2–3	13,964	
6 May 1963	Manchester United	A	3–2	36,000	
11 May 1963	Burnley	H	2–3	23,356	
14 May 1963	Fulham	H	3–0	17,489	
18 May 1963	Sheffield Wednesday	A	3–2	20,514	

=== FA Cup ===
Round	Date	Opponent	Venue	Result	Attendance	Scorers
R3	30 January 1963	Oxford United	H	5–1	14,649	
R4	12 March 1963	Sheffield Wednesday	H	2–0	40,367	
R5	16 March 1963	Liverpool	H	1–2	55,245	
