= George Graham =

Scottish footballer and manager (born 1944)

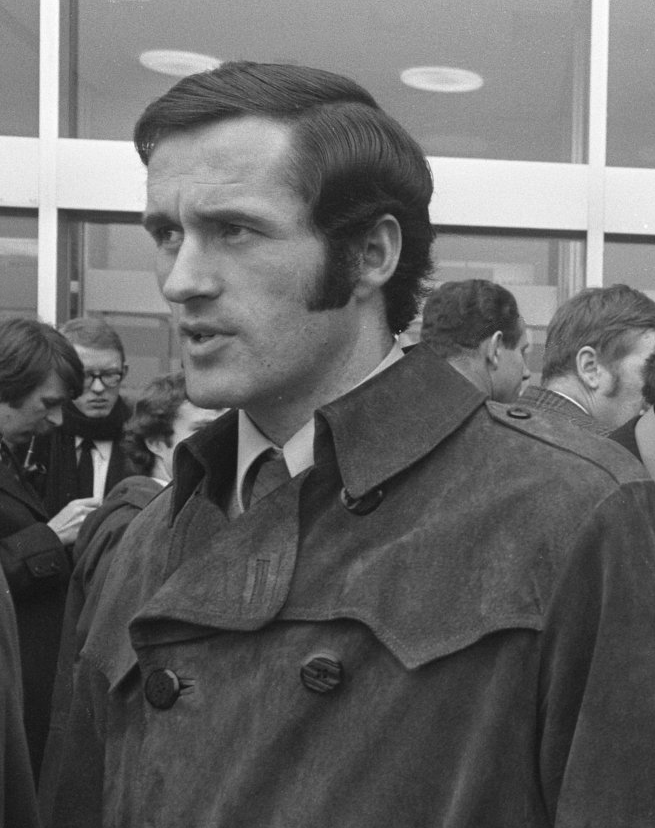
- Graham in 1970

Personal information
- Full name: George Graham
- Date of birth: 30 November 1944 (age 81)
- Place of birth: Bargeddie, Scotland
- Height: 5 ft 11 in (1.80 m)
- Positions: Midfielder; forward

Youth career
- 1959–1961: Aston Villa

Senior career*
Years	Team	Apps	(Gls)
1961–1964	Aston Villa	8	(2)
1964–1966	Chelsea	72	(35)
1966–1972	Arsenal	227	(60)
1972–1974	Manchester United	43	(2)
1974–1976	Portsmouth	61	(5)
1976–1977	Crystal Palace	44	(2)
1978	California Surf	17	(0)
Total		472	(106)

International career
1964–1965	Scotland U23	2	(0)
1971–1973	Scotland	13	(3)

Managerial career
- 1982–1986: Millwall
- 1986–1995: Arsenal
- 1996–1998: Leeds United
- 1998–2001: Tottenham Hotspur
- * Club domestic league appearances and goals

George Graham (born 30 November 1944) is a Scottish former football player and manager.

Nicknamed "Stroller", he made 455 appearances in England's Football League as a midfielder or forward for Aston Villa, Chelsea, Arsenal, Manchester United, Portsmouth and Crystal Palace. Approximately half of his appearances were for Arsenal, and he was part of the side that won the Football League Championship and FA Cup double in 1971. Graham also made 17 appearances for California Surf in the NASL in 1978.

Graham then moved to the coaching staff at Crystal Palace, before joining former Palace manager Terry Venables as a coach at Queens Park Rangers. As a manager, he won numerous honours with Arsenal between 1987 and 1995, including two league titles (in 1989 and 1991), the 1993 FA Cup, two Football League Cups (in 1987 and 1993), as well as the 1994 European Cup Winners' Cup. He also managed Millwall, Leeds United and Tottenham Hotspur.

Graham was one of the most successful managers in Arsenal's history, remaining in charge for almost a decade until he was sacked by the club's board after being found guilty by the Football Association of taking money from transfers. Graham was banned despite paying back the money, which he always claimed was an "unsolicited gift".

== Early life ==
The youngest of seven children, Graham was born at Dykehead Road, Bargeddie, near Coatbridge on Thursday 30 November 1944. He grew up in poverty and was raised by his mother, Janet (26 April 1908 – 27 March 1977), after his father, Robert Young Graham (born 22 June 1900), died of tuberculosis and heart failure on Christmas Day 1944, when George was not yet a month old. His elder sister also died of tuberculosis on 22 February 1950.

While growing up, Graham showed considerable promise as a footballer, and Newcastle United, Chelsea and Aston Villa displayed an interest in signing him.

== Playing career ==
=== Aston Villa ===
Graham received offers from Aston Villa, Chelsea and Newcastle United aged 15, in 1959, and visited all three clubs to see their facilities. He chose Aston Villa mainly as he and his family liked manager Joe Mercer, initially playing for their youth side, he signed professionally in 1961, on his 17th birthday. He spent five seasons at the Birmingham club, but only made ten appearances – though one of them was the club's 1963 League Cup final loss to Birmingham City.

=== Chelsea ===
Chelsea signed Graham in July 1964 for £5,000. He scored 35 goals in 72 league games for the club and won a League Cup medal in 1965 but he, along with several other Chelsea players, increasingly clashed with their volatile manager Tommy Docherty. This culminated in Graham and seven others being sent home and disciplined by Docherty for breaking a pre-match curfew in 1965.

=== Arsenal ===
Bertie Mee's Arsenal were looking for a replacement for Joe Baker, and paid £50,000 plus Tommy Baldwin in 1966 to bring Graham to Highbury. He made his debut on 1 October 1966 at home to Leicester City, and although the result was a 4–2 defeat he immediately became a regular in the Arsenal side. He was Arsenal's top scorer in both 1966–67 and 1967–68, having started out as a centre forward for the club, but later moved back into midfield as an inside forward with John Radford moving from the wing to central striker.

With Arsenal, Graham was a runner-up in both the 1968 and 1969 League Cup finals, before finally winning a medal with the 1969–70 Inter-Cities Fairs Cup. He followed it up with being an integral part of Arsenal's Double-winning side of 1970–71, and even had a claim to scoring Arsenal's equaliser in the FA Cup Final against Liverpool, although Eddie Kelly is officially credited with the goal.

Winning the Double brought the attention of Scotland and Graham was selected for the national side for the first time against Portugal on 13 October 1971. He would go on to win twelve caps over the next two years for Scotland, scoring three goals, his final one coming against Brazil on 30 June 1973. By then, however, Graham was no longer an Arsenal player. The arrival of Alan Ball midway through 1971–72 had made his place in the Arsenal side less assured. In total, he played 308 matches for Arsenal, scoring 77 goals. His final appearance was on 4 November 1972 when he came on as a substitute against Coventry City.

=== Manchester United ===
Graham moved for £120,000 to Manchester United in December 1972, where he was soon reunited with Docherty. He spent two years at United and was relegated to Division Two in 1974. He was sold to Portsmouth during the 1974–75 season.

=== Portsmouth, Crystal Palace and California Surf ===
Graham saw out his career in England at Portsmouth and Crystal Palace. He played the summer of 1978 in America for the California Surf.

== Managerial career ==
=== Millwall ===
After retiring from playing in 1978, Graham became the youth team coach at Crystal Palace and then from October 1980 Queens Park Rangers. On 6 December 1982, he was appointed manager of Millwall, who were then bottom of the old Third Division. Graham turned the side around in a short period of time—they avoided relegation that season on the final match of the season with a 1–0 win at Chesterfield. The following season they finished 9th and in 1984–85 they were promoted to the old Second Division. After Graham left the club in 1986 when Millwall finished mid table, they went on to win the Second Division and win promotion to the First in 1987–88.

=== Arsenal ===
Graham's achievements at Millwall attracted attention from First Division clubs, and with the resignation of Don Howe as Arsenal manager in March 1986, their directors first offered the job to FC Barcelona coach Terry Venables, but he rejected their offer and Arsenal switched their attention to Alex Ferguson, the Aberdeen manager, as their new manager with Graham as his assistant. However, Ferguson (then in temporary charge of the Scotland national football team following the death of Jock Stein the previous September, and still in charge of Aberdeen) had decided to wait until after the World Cup that summer before deciding on his future. Graham himself had never even applied for the Arsenal position but on 12 May 1986 his chairman at Millwall, Alan Thorne, told him that Arsenal wanted to speak to him about the manager's job. After an interview with Peter Hill-Wood, David Dein and Ken Friar at Hill-Wood's home, the Arsenal directors appointed Graham as their new manager on 14 May 1986. A month after arriving at Highbury, Graham was himself linked with the Scotland national team, possibly combining it with the Arsenal manager's job, but that role went to Andy Roxburgh instead.

Arsenal had not won a trophy since the FA Cup in 1978–79, and were drifting away from the top teams in the League, having not finished in the top five during any of the previous four seasons, during which the major honours were picked up by an all-conquering Liverpool as well as the likes of Manchester United and Everton.

Graham quickly discarded the likes of Paul Mariner, who already had been released on a free transfer, Tony Woodcock, Stewart Robson and Tommy Caton, and replaced them with new signings and youth team products. He also imposed much stricter discipline than his predecessors, both in the dressing room and on the pitch and told the team he expected them to be dressed in club blazers on match day. Arsenal's form immediately improved, so much so that the club were top of the League at Christmas 1986, the club's centenary, for the first time in a decade. However, Graham said he knew the team weren't ready to mount a sustained title challenge. This was proven to be correct as Arsenal finished fourth in Graham's first season in charge, but they went on to win the 1987 League Cup, beating Liverpool 2–1 at Wembley on 5 April. The key players in the upturn were young defender Tony Adams and high-scoring winger Martin Hayes.

While Arsenal lost the League Cup final the following year (a shock 3–2 defeat to Luton Town), they remained consistent in the league. Graham's side featured tight defensive discipline, embodied by his young captain Tony Adams, who along with Lee Dixon, Steve Bould and Nigel Winterburn, would form the basis of the club's defence for over a decade. However, contrary to popular belief, during this time Arsenal were not a purely defensive side; Graham also built up an impressive midfield containing David Rocastle, Paul Davis, Michael Thomas and Paul Merson, and striker Alan Smith, whose prolific goal-scoring regularly brought him more than 20 goals per season.

At the end of Graham's third season (1988–89), the club won their first League title since 1971 (when Graham had been an Arsenal player), in highly dramatic fashion, in the final game of the season against holders and league leaders Liverpool at Anfield. Arsenal needed to win by two goals to take the title; Alan Smith scored early in the second half to make it 1–0, but as time ticked by Arsenal struggled to get a second, and with the 90 minutes elapsed on the clock, they still needed another goal. With only seconds to go, a Smith flick-on found Michael Thomas surging through the Liverpool defence; the young midfielder calmly lifted the ball over Bruce Grobbelaar and into the net, and Arsenal were League Champions. However, there was no chance to enter the European Cup just yet for Graham's team, as the ban on English clubs in European competitions (which was imposed by UEFA in 1985 following the Heysel disaster) continued for another season.

After finishing fourth in 1989–90, Graham signed goalkeeper David Seaman and Swedish winger Anders Limpar in the close season; both players proved vital as Arsenal won a second title in 1990–91 and reached the FA Cup semi-finals, losing to arch-rivals Tottenham Hotspur. They lost just one league game all season - their 24th match of the league campaign against Chelsea on 2 February.

Arsenal finished ahead of runners-up Liverpool in the race for the league title that season; in February 1991 the Liverpool manager Kenny Dalglish had suddenly announced his resignation as manager, and Graham's name was among those mentioned by the media as a possible successor to Dalglish. However, Graham was quick to rule himself out of the running, and the job instead went to another Scot, Graeme Souness.

In the autumn of 1991, Graham went on to sign a striker who would break the club's all-time top scoring records, Ian Wright from Crystal Palace, and led the club into their first entry in the European Cup for twenty years. However, the continental adventure was short-lived: Arsenal were knocked out by S.L. Benfica in the second round and failed to make the lucrative final stages. 1991–92 brought more disappointment when the Gunners were knocked out of the FA Cup in the third round by lowly Wrexham, though Arsenal did reasonably well in the league, finishing fourth.

After this season, Graham changed his tactics; he became more defensive and turned out far less attack-minded sides, which depended mainly on goals from Wright rather than the whole team. Between 1986–87 and 1991–92, Arsenal averaged 66 League goals a season (scoring 81 in 1991–92), but between 1992–93 and 1994–95 only averaged 48; this included just 40 in 1992–93, when the club finished 10th in the inaugural season of the FA Premier League, scoring fewer than any other team in the division.

Graham's Arsenal became cup specialists, and in 1992–93 they became the first side to win the FA Cup and League Cup double, both times beating Sheffield Wednesday, 2–1 in the League Cup Final and 2–1 in the FA Cup Final replay. The next season they continued in the same vein, winning the UEFA Cup Winners' Cup, their second European trophy; in the final Arsenal beat favourites and holders Parma 1–0 with a tight defensive performance and Alan Smith's 21st-minute goal from a left foot volley.

The 1994 Cup Winners' Cup proved to be Graham's last trophy at the club. It was on 21 February 1995 that Graham, who had led Arsenal to six trophies in eight seasons, lost his job after a Premier League inquiry found he had accepted an illegal £425,000 payment from Norwegian agent Rune Hauge following Arsenal's 1992 acquisition of John Jensen and Pål Lydersen, two of Hauge's clients. Graham was eventually banned for a year by the Football Association for his involvement in the scandal, after he admitted he had received an "unsolicited gift" from Hauge. At the time, Arsenal were struggling a little in the league, had lost a League Cup quarter final to Liverpool, been dumped out of the FA Cup after a third round replay by Millwall, and (as Cup Winners' Cup holders) had also lost the Super Cup to AC Milan. Regardless, Graham's sacking was more down to the illegal 'brown envelopes' of money, as the word "bung" embedded itself in the football lexicon.

=== Leeds United ===
After serving his ban, Graham's return to football management came with Leeds United in September 1996. After the fifth game of the season he replaced the long-serving Howard Wilkinson. Graham was swiftly appointed but found himself unable to make an immediate impact, leading Leeds to five losses from his first six in the league and another defeat to Aston Villa in the League Cup.

Going into November, Leeds hovered just above the relegation zone with the worst defensive record in the league, having just lost 3-0 to an Arsenal team now coached by Arsene Wenger. Thereafter, however, Graham's defensive-minded strategies began to bear fruit; Leeds kept six clean sheets in their next seven matches, including a club-record five in a row. This was followed by a run of eight clean sheets in nine matches between 11 January and 12 March 1997, albeit with the sole exception being a 4-0 defeat at Anfield. By the end of the season, Leeds had climbed to 11th, having scored just 28 goals (the joint-lowest of any Premier League team to have escaped relegation) yet conceded just 38, fewer than eventual champions Manchester United, as well as accumulating 20 clean sheets, a club record for a 38-game season.

In the 1997–98 season, by contrast, Leeds scored 57 goals, in a season that laid the groundwork for their success in the following seasons. Jimmy Floyd Hasselbaink was signed in the summer of 1997, scoring 16 Premier League goals and 22 in all competitions, as Leeds finished 5th in what would prove to be Graham's solitary season in charge.

Graham left Leeds in acrimonious circumstances, returning to London to take over at Tottenham on 1 October 1998. Following Leeds' UEFA Cup first-round penalty shootout victory over Portuguese side Maritimo on 29 September 1998, Spurs chairman Alan Sugar telephoned Leeds chairman Peter Ridsdale, who admitted that after a brief telephone conversation a deal was done, with compensation agreed which would allow Graham to fulfil his wish of returning to London. Graham had made no secret of his desire to head back to the capital following Leeds' 3–3 draw with Tottenham three days prior, citing family and personal reasons.

=== Tottenham Hotspur ===
Five months after taking charge of Tottenham Hotspur, he guided the club to victory over Leicester City in the 1999 League Cup Final, and with it a place in the 1999–2000 UEFA Cup. Despite guiding the club to its first trophy in eight seasons, Graham could not achieve a finish higher than tenth in the Premier League.

Tottenham reached the last four of the 2000–01 FA Cup with a 3–2 victory over West Ham United on 11 March 2001 and Graham was looking forward to pitting his wits against his former club Arsenal in the semi-finals. He was sacked five days later, on 16 March 2001, soon after the club had been purchased by ENIC, for alleged breach of contract. The club stated that Graham had been issued "several written warnings prior to his sacking for giving out what was deemed by the club as being private information" before, earlier that week, apparently informing the media he had "a limited budget" for new players and expressing his disappointment with it. This led to his being summoned to a meeting with Spurs executive vice-chairman David Buchler, after which he was dismissed. Buchler subsequently questioned whether Graham had the interests of the club at heart and described his conduct in the meeting as "aggressive and defiant". Graham's legal representatives issued a statement expressing he was "shocked and upset to have been sacked and could not believe such a flimsy excuse was given". It went on to say that Graham "believes ENIC always intended to sack him."

=== Since 2001 ===
After Spurs, Graham never returned to management. He was a pundit on Sky TV for several years, in particular their PremPlus channel. He also commentated on the 2001, 2002, 2003 and 2005 FA Cup Finals featuring Arsenal.

However, he was linked with several managerial vacancies after leaving Tottenham. In October 2001, following the dismissal of Peter Taylor at Leicester City, he was linked with that vacancy, but it was filled by Dave Bassett instead.

The following season, with Glenn Roeder under fire at the helm of a West Ham United side heading for Premier League relegation, Graham's name was mentioned as a possible replacement, but Roeder actually lasted until the opening weeks of the 2003–04 season and this time there was little mention of Graham's name in the hunt for a successor, which ended with the appointment of Alan Pardew. In the 2003 close season, the resignation of Graham Taylor at Aston Villa saw Graham's name mentioned by the media as a possible successor, but again nothing came of it, with this vacancy being filled by David O'Leary, who had played under Graham at Arsenal and worked as his assistant at Leeds. He and O'Leary had both been mentioned as candidates for the job at Sunderland twice during the 2002–03 season following the departure of Peter Reid in October and Howard Wilkinson in March.

== Personal life ==
On 16 September 1967, Graham married model Marie Zia at Marylebone Register Office; his close friend Terry Venables acted as his best man and the two players took to the field the same afternoon for opposing teams in a North London derby; the groom's team won 4–0. The couple had two children. The marriage ended in 1988.

Graham married Susan Schmidt on 13 December 1998 in Marlow, Buckinghamshire, and live in Hampstead, London.

Graham revealed in 2009 that he has arthritis. "I love my golf but because of my arthritis, I've not played much in the last two years, if any. When I was a player, when I had a lot of time on my hands, I got down to an eight handicap. But when I was manager, I went back to 12. I've just taken up tennis and have to say I'm not very good."

== Career statistics ==
=== Club ===
Appearances and goals by club, season and competition
Club	Season	League			FA Cup		League Cup		Europe		Total	
Club	Season	Division	Apps	Goals	Apps	Goals	Apps	Goals	Apps	Goals	Apps	Goals
Aston Villa	1961–62	First Division	0	0	0	0	0	0	—		0	0
Aston Villa	1962–63	First Division	2	1	0	0	2	0	—		4	1
Aston Villa	1963–64	First Division	6	1	0	0	0	0	—		6	1
Aston Villa	Total		8	2	0	0	2	0	0	0	10	2
Chelsea	1964–65	First Division	30	17	5	0	7	4	—		42	21
Chelsea	1965–66	First Division	33	17	6	3	0	0	11	3	50	23
Chelsea	1966–67	First Division	9	1	—		1	1	—		10	2
Chelsea	Total		72	35	11	3	8	5	11	3	102	46
Arsenal	1966–67	First Division	33	11	4	1	—		—		37	12
Arsenal	1967–68	First Division	38	16	5	0	8	5	—		51	21
Arsenal	1968–69	First Division	26	4	1	0	5	0	—		32	4
Arsenal	1969–70	First Division	36	7	2	0	4	2	11	5	53	14
Arsenal	1970–71	First Division	38	11	6	1	5	1	8	1	57	14
Arsenal	1971–72	First Division	40	8	9	0	4	1	6	1	59	10
Arsenal	1972–73	First Division	16	2	—		3	0	—		19	2
Arsenal	Total		227	59	27	2	29	9	25	7	308	79
Manchester United	1972–73	First Division	18	1	1	0	—		—		19	1
Manchester United	1973–74	First Division	24	1	1	0	1	0	—		26	1
Manchester United	1974–75	Second Division	1	0	—		0	0	—		1	0
Manchester United	Total		43	2	2	0	1	0	0	0	46	2
Portsmouth	1974–75	Second Division	19	3	1	0	0	0	—		20	3
Portsmouth	1975–76	Second Division	39	2	4	0	4	1	—		47	3
Portsmouth	1976–77	Third Division	3	0	—		1	0	—		4	0
Portsmouth	Total		51	5	5	0	5	1	0	0	61	6
Crystal Palace	1976–77	Third Division	23	2	3	1	—		—		26	3
Crystal Palace	1977–78	Second Division	21	0	0	0	4	1	—		25	1
Crystal Palace	Total		44	2	3	1	4	1	0	0	51	4
California Surf	1978	NASL	17	0	—		—		—		17	0
Career total			472	106	48	6	49	16	36	10	605	138

== Managerial statistics ==
Managerial record by team and tenure
Team	From	To	Record				
Team	From	To	P	W	D	L	Win %
Millwall	6 December 1982	14 May 1986	201	91	51	59	45.3
Arsenal	14 May 1986	21 February 1995	460	225	133	102	48.9
Leeds United	10 September 1996	1 October 1998	95	37	27	31	38.9
Tottenham Hotspur	1 October 1998	16 March 2001	108	40	30	38	37.0
Total			844	373	241	230	44.2

== Honours ==
=== Player ===
Aston Villa

- Football League Cup runner-up: 1962–63

Chelsea

- Football League Cup: 1964–65

Arsenal

- Football League First Division: 1970–71
- FA Cup: 1970–71; runner-up: 1971–72
- Inter-Cities Fairs Cup: 1969–70
- Football League Cup runner-up: 1967–68, 1968–69

=== Manager ===
Millwall

- Football League Group Cup: 1982–83
- Football League Third Division promotion: 1984–85

Arsenal

- Football League First Division: 1988–89, 1990–91
- FA Cup: 1992–93
- Football League Cup: 1986–87, 1992–93; runner-up: 1987–88
- FA Charity Shield: 1991 (shared)
- Football League Centenary Trophy: 1988
- European Cup Winners' Cup: 1993–94

Tottenham Hotspur

- Football League Cup: 1998–99

Individual

- Premier League Manager of the Month: November 1997

=== Inductions ===
- Scottish Football Hall of Fame: 2015

== See also ==
- List of English football championship winning managers
