= 1981–82 Swansea City A.F.C. season =

Swansea City
1981–82 season
- Chairman: Malcolm Struel
- Manager: John Toshack (player-manager)
- Stadium: Vetch Field
- First Division: 6th
- FA Cup: Third round
- League Cup: Second round
- Welsh Cup: Winners
- Cup Winners' Cup: First round
- Top goalscorer: League: Robbie James(15); All: Robbie James(20)
- Highest home attendance: 24,115 vs Manchester United (30 January 1982)
- Lowest home attendance: 11,811 vs Stoke City (6 March 1982)
- Average home league attendance: 18,194
Home colours	Away colours

During the 1981–82 English football season, Swansea City A.F.C. competed in the Football League First Division, following promotion from the Second Division. It was their debut season in the English top flight and the first season in which a Welsh club was part of the top English league since arch-rivals Cardiff City were relegated at the end of 1961–62.

== Background ==
Swansea's rise to the top flight of English football had come only four seasons after competing in the Fourth Division and thus few tipped Swansea to survive in the First Division. Swansea soon proved the naysayers wrong by crushing Leeds United 5–1 in their first match ever in the top flight, with debutant Bob Latchford scoring a hat-trick. The win saw Swansea rise from the basement division to the top of the entire Football League in barely three years. Victories over footballing royalty such as Liverpool, Manchester United, Arsenal and Tottenham Hotspur followed as the club topped the league on several further occasions. However, injuries to key players took their toll, and the lack of depth in the squad meant that the season ended in sixth-place finish.

=== Transfers ===
==== In ====
- (Wales) Dai Davies - (Wales) Wrexham, July
- (England) Ray Kennedy - (England) Liverpool, January, £160,000
- (Wales) Ian Walsh - (England) Crystal Palace, February
- (England) Colin Irwin - (England) Liverpool, £338,800

==== Out ====
- (Wales) Leighton Phillips - (England) Charlton Athletic, June, £25,000
- (Wales) David Giles - (England) Leyton Orient, December, loan

== Football League First Division ==
=== Results ===
29 August 1981 1	Swansea City	5–1	Leeds United	Swansea
	Charles 5'; Latchford 46', 50', 55'; Curtis 70'		Parlane 26'	Stadium: Vetch Field; Attendance: 23,500; Referee: S Bates

1 September 1981 2	Brighton & Hove Albion	1–2	Swansea City	Hove
	Ritchie 33'		L.James 10'; Latchford 14'	Stadium: Goldstone Ground; Attendance: 19,885; Referee: D Vickers

5 September 1981 3	West Bromwich Albion	4–1	Swansea City	West Bromwich
	Regis 17', 67', 73'; MacKenzie 69'		Robinson 76'	Stadium: The Hawthorns; Attendance: 18,063; Referee: R Bridges

12 September 1981 4	Swansea City	3–2	Notts. County	Swansea
	Curtis 23'; L.James 37'; Latchford 52'		O'Brien 65' (pen.); McCulloch 85'	Stadium: Vetch Field; Attendance: 14,391; Referee: T Spencer

19 September 1981 5	Manchester United	1–0	Swansea City	Manchester
	Birtles 37'			Stadium: Old Trafford; Attendance: 47,309; Referee: GJ Napthine

22 September 1981 6	Swansea City	2–1	Tottenham Hotspur	Swansea
	R.James 62', 74'		Hoddle 65' (pen.)	Stadium: Vetch Field; Attendance: 22,206; Referee: DW Civil

26 September 1981 7	Swansea City	2–0	Sunderland	Swansea
	Curtis 56'; L.James 82' (pen.)			Stadium: Vetch Field; Attendance: 17,826; Referee: R Baker

3 October 1981 8	Liverpool	2–2	Swansea City	Liverpool
	McDermott 59' (pen.), 63' (pen.)		L.James 15' (pen.); Latchford 57'	Stadium: Anfield; Attendance: 48,645; Referee: A Challinor

10 October 1981 9	Swansea City	2–0	Arsenal	Swansea
	L.James 38'; Thompson 83'			Stadium: Vetch Field; Attendance: 20,600; Referee: LM Robinson

17 October 1981 10	Stoke City	1–2	Swansea City	Stoke-on-Trent
	Griffiths 35'		Stanley 65'; Latchford 79'	Stadium: Victoria Ground; Attendance: 14,665; Referee: D Scott

24 October 1981 11	Coventry City	3–1	Swansea City	Coventry
	Hateley 37', 53'; Kaiser 39'		Curtis 74'	Stadium: Highfield Road; Attendance: 14,050; Referee: M Lowe

31 October 1981 12	Swansea City	0–0	Wolverhampton Wanderers	Swansea
				Stadium: Vetch Field; Attendance: 17,750; Referee: E Read

7 November 1981 13	Ipswich Town	2–3	Swansea City	Ipswich
	Mariner 53'; Muhren 81'		Curtis 7'; Latchford 63'; Stanley 83'	Stadium: Portman Road; Attendance: 24,190; Referee: K Salmon

21 November 1981 14	Manchester City	4–0	Swansea City	Manchester
	Tueart 41' (pen.), 86'; Reeves 63', 84'			Stadium: Maine Road; Attendance: 34,744; Referee: G Courtney

24 November 1981 15	Swansea City	0–0	Brighton & Hove Albion	Swansea
				Stadium: Vetch Field; Attendance: 14,459; Referee: K Baker

28 November 1981 16	Swansea City	1–0	Birmingham City	Swansea
	R.James 66'			Stadium: Vetch Field; Attendance: 15,097; Referee: D Hutchinson

5 December 1981 17	Everton	3–1	Swansea City	Liverpool
	Sharp 49'; O'Keefe 62', 67'		Latchford 79'	Stadium: Goodison Park; Attendance: 23,860; Referee: KA Redfern

12 December 1981 18	Swansea City	1–2	Nottingham Forest	Swansea
	R.James 34'		Young 77'; Robertson 89' (pen.)	Stadium: Vetch Field; Attendance: 17,550; Referee: D Lloyd

15 December 1981 19	Swansea City	2–1	Aston Villa	Swansea
	R.James 12', 40'		Thompson 14'(o.g.)	Stadium: Vetch Field; Attendance: 15,191; Referee: AR Glasson

28 December 1981 20	Southampton	3–1	Swansea City	Southampton
	Armstrong 3'; Keegan 50', 67'		Rajković 14'	Stadium: The Dell; Attendance: 22,703; Referee: LC Shapter

16 January 1982 21	Leeds United	2–0	Swansea City	Leeds
	Stevenson 17'; Butterworth 48'			Stadium: Elland Road; Attendance: 18,709; Referee: NL Wilson

30 January 1982 22	Swansea City	2–0	Manchester United	Swansea
	Curtis 54'; R.James 56'			Stadium: Vetch Field; Attendance: 24,115; Referee: JE Martin

6 February 1982 23	Notts. County	0–1	Swansea City	Nottingham
			L.James 12' (pen.)	Stadium: Meadow Lane; Attendance: 10,070; Referee: N Midgley

13 February 1982 24	Middlesbrough	1–1	Swansea City	Middlesbrough
	McAndrew 67' (pen.)		Kennedy 38'	Stadium: Ayresome Park; Attendance: 11,209; Referee: D Webb

16 February 1982 25	Swansea City	2–0	Liverpool	Swansea
	L.James 74'; Curtis 89'			Stadium: Vetch Field; Attendance: 22,604; Referee: VG Callow

20 February 1982 26	Sunderland	0–1	Swansea City	Sunderland
			L.James 23'	Stadium: Roker Park; Attendance: 13,163; Referee: RF Nixon

27 February 1982 27	Arsenal	0–2	Swansea City	London
			Kennedy 17'; R.James 65' (pen.)	Stadium: Highbury Stadium; Attendance: 29,724; Referee: H Taylor

6 March 1982 28	Swansea City	3–0	Stoke City	Swansea
	R.James 34', 87'; Charles 72'			Stadium: Vetch Field; Attendance: 11,811; Referee: LF Burden

13 March 1982 29	Swansea City	0–0	Coventry City	Swansea
				Stadium: Vetch Field; Attendance: 16,425; Referee: LF Burden

20 March 1982 30	Wolverhampton Wanderers	0–1	Swansea City	Wolverhampton
			Walsh 35'	Stadium: Molineux; Attendance: 14,158; Referee: T Fitzharris

27 March 1982 31	Swansea City	1–2	Ipswich Town	Swansea
	R.James 31' (pen.)		Brazil 20'; Gates 88'	Stadium: Vetch Field; Attendance: 20,750; Referee: BL Newsome

30 March 1982 32	Swansea City	0–1	West Ham United	Swansea
			Van der Elst 9'	Stadium: Vetch Field; Attendance: 20,272; Referee: BT Stevens

6 April 1982 33	Swansea City	3–1	West Bromwich Albion	Swansea
	Marustik 59'; Curtis 80'; Latchford 89'		MacKenzie 45'	Stadium: Vetch Field; Attendance: 15,744; Referee: RG Milford

10 April 1982 34	West Ham United	1–1	Swansea City	London
	Goddard 89'		R.James 34'	Stadium: Boleyn Ground; Attendance: 26,566; Referee: A Robinson

13 April 1982 35	Swansea City	1–0	Southampton	Swansea
	Curtis 27'			Stadium: Vetch Field; Attendance: 23,771; Referee: AJ Hamil

17 April 1982 36	Swansea City	2–0	Manchester City	Swansea
	Stanley 11'; Latchford 36'			Stadium: Vetch Field; Attendance: 19,212; Referee: KW Baker

24 April 1982 37	Birmingham City	2–1	Swansea City	Birmingham
	Broadhurst 32'; Harford 78'		Walsh 54'	Stadium: St Andrew's (stadium); Attendance: 14,973; Referee: CB White

1 May 1982 38	Swansea City	1–3	Everton	Swansea
	R.James 76'		Heath 26'; Sharp 50' (pen.), 60'	Stadium: Vetch Field; Attendance: 16,243; Referee: DA Hedges

5 May 1982 39	Tottenham Hotspur	2–1	Swansea City	London
	Brooke 23', 55' (pen.)		L.James 70'	Stadium: White Hart Lane; Attendance: 26,358; Referee: LC Shapter

8 May 1982 40	Nottingham Forest	0–2	Swansea City	Nottingham
			R.James 2', 83'	Stadium: City Ground; Attendance: 15,037; Referee: KP Barratt

15 May 1982 41	Swansea City	1–2	Middlesbrough	Swansea
	Latchford 77'		Otto 84'; Stanley 89' (o.g.)	Stadium: Vetch Field; Attendance: 12,961; Referee: D Letts

21 May 1982 42	Aston Villa	3–0	Swansea City	Birmingham
	Morley 36'; Bremner 44'; Withe 65'			Stadium: Villa Park; Attendance: 18,294; Referee: M Dimblebee

Last updated: 4 September 2013

=== Classification ===
Pos	Team	Pld	W	D	L	GF	GA	GD	Pts	Qualification or relegation
4	Tottenham Hotspur	42	20	11	11	67	48	+19	71	Qualification for the Cup Winners' Cup first round (Note: Tottenham Hotspur qualified for the European Cup Winners' Cup first round as the 1981–82 FA Cup winners.)
5	Arsenal	42	20	11	11	48	37	+11	71	Qualification for the UEFA Cup first round
6	Swansea City	42	21	6	15	58	51	+7	69	Qualification for the Cup Winners' Cup preliminary round (Note: Swansea City qualified for the European Cup Winners' Cup preliminary round as the 1982 Welsh Cup winners.)
7	Southampton	42	19	9	14	72	67	+5	66	Qualification for the UEFA Cup first round
8	Everton	42	17	13	12	56	50	+6	64	

Source: World Football
Rules for classification: 1) Points; 2) Goal difference; 3) Goals scored

==== Results summary ====
Overall								Home						Away					
Pld	W	D	L	GF	GA	GD	Pts	W	D	L	GF	GA	GD	W	D	L	GF	GA	GD
42	21	6	15	58	51	+7	69	13	3	5	34	16	+18	8	3	10	24	35	−11

Source: statto.com

==== Results by round ====
Round	1	2	3	4	5	6	7	8	9	10	11	12	13	14	15	16	17	18	19	20	21	22	23	24	25	26	27	28	29	30	31	32	33	34	35	36	37	38	39	40	41	42
Ground	H	A	A	H	A	H	H	A	H	A	A	H	A	A	H	H	A	H	H	A	A	H	A	A	H	A	A	H	H	A	H	H	H	A	H	H	A	H	A	A	H	A
Result	W	W	L	W	L	W	W	D	W	W	L	D	W	L	D	W	L	L	W	L	L	W	W	D	W	W	W	W	D	W	L	L	W	D	W	W	L	L	L	W	L	L
Position	1	1	6	2	4	3	3	3	2	1	3	4	3	4	3	2	4	4	1	3	5	6	5	5	4	3	2	2	2	1	2	4	4	3	3	3	3	4	5	5	6	6

Source: statto.com
A = Away; H = Home; W = Win; D = Draw; L = Loss

== FA Cup ==
2 January 1982 Third round	Swansea City	0–4	Liverpool	Swansea
			Hansen 35'; Rush 45', 88'; Lawrenson 73'	Stadium: Vetch Field; Attendance: 24,179; Referee: CB White

Last updated: 4 September 2013

== Football League Cup ==
6 October 1981 Second round, first leg	Barnsley	2–0	Swansea City	Barnsley
	Riley 47'; Evans 73'			Stadium: Oakwell; Attendance: 12,793; Referee: RA Banks

27 October 1981 Second round, second leg	Swansea City	3–2 (a.e.t.) (3–4 agg.)	Barnsley	Swansea
	L.James 18' (pen.); Irwin 66'; Curtis 73'		Glavin 46'; Cooper 114'	Stadium: Vetch Field; Attendance: 9,897; Referee: A Seville

Last updated: 4 September 2013

== Welsh Cup ==
2 December 1981 Third round	Stafford Rangers	0–4	Swansea City	Stafford
			Curtis 23'; Thompson 30'; Harris 49' (o.g.); Latchford 90'	Stadium: Marston Road; Attendance: 3,077; Referee: EG Morgan

22 December 1981 Fourth Round	Swansea City	6–0	Worcester City	Swansea
	R.James 2', 21', 84'; L.James 29'; Stanley 34'; Attley 55'			Stadium: Vetch Field; Attendance: 4,838; Referee: C Thomas

9 February 1982 Fifth Round	Swansea City	2–2	Colwyn Bay	Swansea
	Stanley 25'; Irwin 62'		Phillips 9', 52'	Stadium: Vetch Field; Attendance: 3,385; Referee: EG Morgan

2 March 1982 Fifth Round Replay	Swansea City	3–0	Colwyn Bay	Swansea
	Curtis 2'; R.James 4', 58'			Stadium: Vetch Field; Attendance: 4,922; Referee: EG Morgan

16 March 1982 Semi-final first leg	Bangor City	1–2	Swansea City	Bangor, Gwynedd
	Urquhart 27'		L.James 57'; Curtis 78'	Stadium: Farrar Road Stadium; Attendance: 7,500; Referee: R Bridges

20 April 1982 Semi-final second leg	Swansea City	0–0 (2–1 agg.)	Bangor City	Swansea
				Stadium: Vetch Field; Attendance: 5,700; Referee: R Bridges

11 May 1982 Final first leg	Cardiff City	0–0	Swansea City	Cardiff
				Stadium: Ninian Park; Attendance: 11,960; Referee: GP Owen

19 May 1982 Final second leg	Swansea City	2–1 (2–1 agg.)	Cardiff City	Swansea
	Latchford 7', 18'		Bennett 3'	Stadium: Vetch Field; Attendance: 15,828; Referee: GP Owen

Last updated: 19 January 2014
Sources:, Welsh Football Data Archive

== European Cup Winners' Cup ==
16 September 1981 First round, first leg	Swansea City (Wales)	0–1	(East Germany) Lokomotive Leipzig	Swansea
			Kinne 70'	Stadium: Vetch Field; Attendance: 10,295; Referee: J Quinou

30 September 1981 First round, second leg	Lokomotive Leipzig (East Germany)	2–1 (3–1 agg.)	(Wales) Swansea City	Leipzig
	Kinne 13'; Moldt 22'		Charles 78'	Stadium: Bruno-Plache-Stadion; Attendance: 22,500; Referee: M Ciulli (Italy)

Last updated: 4 September 2013

== Kit ==
Swansea's kit was manufactured by Belgian company Patrick. The kit bore no sponsorship.

== Squad ==
Squad at end of season

Note: Flags indicate national team as defined under FIFA eligibility rules; some limited exceptions apply. Players may hold more than one non-FIFA nationality.

Pos.	Nation	Player
GK	WAL	Dai Davies
DF	ENG	Colin Irwin (captain)
DF	WAL	Wyndham Evans
DF	WAL	Dudley Lewis
DF	WAL	Nigel Stephenson
DF	YUG	Džemal Hadžiabdić
DF	YUG	Ante Rajković
MF	ENG	Ray Kennedy
MF	WAL	David Giles
MF	WAL	Leighton James

Pos.	Nation	Player
MF	WAL	Robbie James
MF	WAL	John Mahoney
MF	WAL	Chris Marustik
MF	WAL	Neil Robinson
FW	WAL	Jeremy Charles
FW	WAL	Alan Curtis
FW	WAL	Dean Saunders
FW	WAL	John Toshack (player-manager)
FW	WAL	Ian Walsh

=== Left club during season ===
Note: Flags indicate national team as defined under FIFA eligibility rules; some limited exceptions apply. Players may hold more than one non-FIFA nationality.

Pos.	Nation	Player
MF	WAL	David Giles (on loan to Leyton Orient)

== Squad statistics ==
Last updated on 4 September 2013

=== Appearances and goals ===
No.	Pos	Player	League		FA Cup		League Cup		Welsh Cup		Cup Winners' Cup		Total	
No.	Pos	Player	App.	Goals	App.	Goals	App.	Goals	App.	Goals	App.	Goals	App.	Goals
-	GK	(Wales) Dai Davies	41	0	1	0	2	0	7	0	2	0	53	0
-	GK	(Wales) Chris Sander	1	0	0	0	0	0	1	0	0	0	2	0
-	GK	(Scotland) David Stewart	0	0	0	0	0	0	0	0	0	0	0	0
-	DF	(Socialist Federal Republic of Yugoslavia) Ante Rajković	40	1	1	0	1	0	7	0	2	0	51	1
-	DF	(England) Colin Irwin	37	0	1	0	2	1	4	1	0	0	44	2
-	DF	(Socialist Federal Republic of Yugoslavia) Džemal Hadžiabdić	25(+1)	0	0	0	0	0	6	0	2	0	33(+1)	0
-	DF	(England) Max Thompson	22(+1)	1	0(+1)	0	1	0	4	1	0	0	27(+2)	2
-	DF	(Wales) Nigel Stevenson	20	0	1	0	0(+1)	0	5	0	2	0	28(+1)	0
-	DF	(Wales) Dudley Lewis	1	0	0	0	1	0	0	0	0	0	2	0
-	DF	(Wales) Wyndham Evans	1	0	0	0	0	0	0	0	0(+2)	0	1(+2)	0
-	DF	(Wales) Gary Richards	1	0	0	0	0	0	0	0	0	0	1	0
-	DF	(Wales) Dave Rushbury	0	0	0	0	0	0	0	0	0	0	0	0
-	MF	(Wales) Robbie James	42	15	1	0	1	0	8	5	1	0	53	20
-	MF	(Wales) Leighton James	34(+4)	9	1	0	2	1	7	2	2	0	46(+4)	12
-	MF	(Wales) Neil Robinson	27(+2)	1	0	0	2	0	5	0	2	0	37(+2)	1
-	MF	(Wales) John Mahoney	25	0	1	0	1	0	3(+2)	0	2	0	32(+2)	0
-	MF	(England) Gary Stanley	22(+7)	3	1	0	2	0	6	2	0	0	31(+7)	5
-	MF	(Wales) Chris Marustik	19(+3)	1	1	0	2	0	5	0	0	0	27(+3)	1
-	MF	(England) Ray Kennedy	18	2	0	0	0	0	4	0	0	0	22	2
-	MF	(Wales) Brian Attley	2(+2)	0	0	0	0(+1)	0	0(+1)	1	1	0	3(+4)	1
-	MF	(Wales) Jimmy Loveridge	1	0	0	0	0	0	0	0	0	0	1	0
-	MF	(Wales) David Giles	0(+2)	0	0	0	0	0	0	0	0(+2)	0	0(+4)	0
-	MF	(Scotland) Tommy Craig	0	0	0	0	0	0	0	0	0	0	0	0
-	FW	(Wales) Alan Curtis	40	9	1	0	2	1	7	3	2	0	52	13
-	FW	(England) Bob Latchford	31	12	1	0	2	0	5(+1)	3	2	0	41(+1)	15
-	FW	(Wales) Jeremy Charles	9(+4)	2	0	0	1	0	2	0	2	1	14(+4)	3
-	FW	(Wales) Ian Walsh	3(+2)	2	0	0	0	0	0(+1)	0	0	0	3(+3)	2
-	FW	(Wales) Darren Gale	0(+1)	0	0	0	0	0	0(+1)	0	0	0	0(+2)	0

=== Top scorers ===
Place	Position	Nationality	Number	Name	League	FA Cup	League Cup	Welsh Cup	Cup Winners' Cup	Total
1	MF	(Wales)	-	Robbie James	15	0	0	5	0	20
2	FW	(England)	-	Bob Latchford	12	0	0	3	0	15
3	FW	(Wales)	-	Alan Curtis	9	0	1	3	0	13
4	MF	(Wales)	-	Leighton James	9	0	1	2	0	12
5	MF	(England)	-	Gary Stanley	3	0	0	2	0	5
6	FW	(Wales)	-	Jeremy Charles	2	0	0	0	1	3
7	FW	(Wales)	-	Ian Walsh	2	0	0	0	0	2
8	MF	(England)	-	Ray Kennedy	2	0	0	0	0	2
9	MF	(Wales)	-	Chris Marustik	1	0	0	0	0	1
10	DF	(Socialist Federal Republic of Yugoslavia)	-	Ante Rajković	1	0	0	0	0	1
11	DF	(England)	-	Neil Robinson	1	0	0	0	0	1
12	DF	(England)	-	Max Thompson	1	0	0	1	0	2
13	DF	(England)	-	Colin Irwin	0	0	1	1	0	2
14	DF	(Wales)	-	Brian Attley	0	0	0	1	0	1
15	-	-	-	Own goal	0	0	0	1	0	1
TOTALS					58	0	3	19	1	81

== See also ==
- 1981–82 in English football
- List of Swansea City A.F.C. seasons
