= 1971–72 Arsenal F.C. season =

English football club season

Arsenal
1971–72 season
- Chairman: Denis Hill-Wood
- Manager: Bertie Mee
- First Division: 5th
- FA Cup: Runners-up
- League Cup: Fourth round
- European Cup: Quarter-finals
- Top goalscorer: League: Ray Kennedy (12); All: Ray Kennedy (19)
- Highest home attendance: 63,077 Derby County (29 February 1972)
- Lowest home attendance: 27,172 Southampton (28 March 1972)
- Average home league attendance: 40,500
| Home colours | Away colours |

The 1971–72 season was Arsenal Football Club's 46th consecutive season in the Football League First Division. Arsenal finished fifth in the league.

In Cup play, Arsenal featured for the first time in the European Cup, but went out to defending champions Ajax in the quarterfinals. Arsenal were knocked out of the League Cup in the fourth round by Sheffield United. In the FA Cup, Arsenal reached the final, their fifth cup final in five years. However, the team could not follow up on the previous year's victory and lost 1-0 to Leeds United.

Ray Kennedy was the top scorer in both the league and in all competitions. Frank McLintock served as captain.

In June 1971, the club saw the exit of Don Howe as manager Bertie Mee's hands-on coach. He was replaced with Steve Burtenshaw. In December, midfielder Alan Ball joined Arsenal to strengthen the squad.

== Season summary ==
Following up the 1970-71 Double was always going to be difficult. On 15 June, that proposition was made even harder by the departure of Don Howe, the hands-on second-in-command to Bertie Mee who was widely considered the originator of the Double. Howe accepted an offer to become the manager of West Brom. Two other Arsenal staff, George Wright and youth coach Brian Whitehouse, also moved to West Brom. Steve Burtenshaw was appointed to Howe's previous position. Arsenal's only other summer transfer news was that Jon Sammels left the club for Leicester City at a price of £100,000.

Arsenal began the season with a convincing win over Chelsea, followed up by beating Huddersfield. The dynamic Charlie George missed the opening of the season with cartilage trouble. However, Arsenal's fortunes soon turned and they were defeated three times in a row, including a loss to newly promoted Sheffield United at home, Arsenal's first loss at Highbury in 19 months.

Arsenal's inconsistencies prevented them from being serious title contenders. Injuries left John Radford, Charlie George, Peter Marinello, and Bob McNab out of the squad for parts of the seasons, and other players such as Peter Simpson and Peter Storey suffered from poor form. In December, Mee paid a Football League record fee of £200,000 for Everton's Alan Ball in order to strengthen the squad. Despite some of these issues, midway through the season, Arsenal went on a 14-match unbeaten run after a dismal 5-1 loss to Wolves. The run left them just four points from the top. However, they were to find rather less success with the rest of the season. They still affected the title race, as a 0-0 draw with Liverpool in the penultimate game of the season handed the league championship to Derby County. Arsenal ended the season with a 2-0 home defeat to Tottenham and finished fifth.

Arsenal featured in the European Cup for the first time, reaching the quarterfinals. Ball joined the team too late to be eligible for Arsenal's quarterfinal matchup. After beating Stroemsgodset 3-1 in their first game and 4-0 at home in the next, Arsenal faced Grasshopper Club Zurich, winning 5-0 on aggregate. Arsenal faced European Cup holders Ajax in the quarterfinals, playing against Johan Cruyff and other great young players. They lost 2-1 away, meaning a 1-0 victory at home would take Arsenal to the semifinals. Instead, Arsenal lost 1-0 thanks to a George Graham own goal.

New signing Ball was especially influential in Arsenal's FA Cup run. Facing Swindon in the third round, Ball provided first a goal and assist to help Arsenal ease past their opponents. Arsenal then muddled 2-1 away past Fourth Division Reading. Derby County in the fifth round took three games. The first was a 2-2 tie away at the Baseball Ground in which George netted twice, the field described as a "bog" and the game extremely tough. Then, the two teams tied 0-0 at Highbury. Arsenal won the second replay with a goal from Kennedy. In the quarterfinals, Arsenal faced Orient and beat them 1-0 away.

Arsenal's semifinal opponents were again Stoke City, with Arsenal fielding nearly an unchanged side from the same game the year before. Ball was included in place of Kennedy, all other starters from the previous season remained. After Armstrong opened the scoring, Arsenal's goalkeeper Bob Wilson was injured but left on the field. A mistake from Simpson trying to protect his goalkeeper led to an own goal and a tie. Wilson was pulled off the field for Kennedy, and Radford took to the goal to help his team stay in the Cup. With reserve keeper Geoff Barnett now in goal, Arsenal beat Stoke in the replay with goals from George and Radford, and faced Leeds United in the final. It was a tough match at Wembley, in front of the Queen and Prince Philip. Arsenal were outplayed and lost due to a headed goal from Allan Clarke.

Arsenal followed up their stellar Double season with disappointment in a fifth-place league finish and finalists medals in the FA Cup. The FA Cup final had been their fifth Cup final in five years.

== Final league table ==
| Pos | Team | Pld | W | D | L | GF | GA | GAv | Pts | Qualification or relegation |
|---|---|---|---|---|---|---|---|---|---|---|
| 3 | Liverpool | 42 | 24 | 9 | 9 | 64 | 30 | 2.133 | 57 | Qualification for the UEFA Cup first round |
| 4 | Manchester City | 42 | 23 | 11 | 8 | 77 | 45 | 1.711 | 57 | Qualification for the UEFA Cup first round |
| 5 | Arsenal | 42 | 22 | 8 | 12 | 58 | 40 | 1.450 | 52 | |
| 6 | Tottenham Hotspur | 42 | 19 | 13 | 10 | 63 | 42 | 1.500 | 51 | Qualification for the UEFA Cup first round (Note: Tottenham Hotspur qualified for the UEFA Cup as the 1971-72 UEFA Cup winners.) |
| 7 | Chelsea | 42 | 18 | 12 | 12 | 58 | 49 | 1.184 | 48 | |

Source: World Football
Rules for classification: 1) Points; 2) Goal average; 3) Goals scored

== Results ==
Arsenal's score comes first

=== Legend ===
| Win | Draw | Loss |

=== Football League First Division ===
| Date | Opponent | Venue | Result | Attendance | Scorers |
|---|---|---|---|---|---|
| 14 August 1971 | Chelsea | H | 3–0 | 49,174 | Kennedy, McLintock, Radford |
| 17 August 1971 | Huddersfield Town | A | 1–0 | 21,279 | Kennedy |
| 20 August 1971 | Manchester United | A | 1–3 | 27,649 | McLintock |
| 24 August 1971 | Sheffield United | H | 0–1 | 45,395 | |
| 28 August 1971 | Stoke City | H | 0–1 | 37,637 | |
| 4 September 1971 | West Bromwich Albion | A | 1–0 | 29,922 | Roberts |
| 11 September 1971 | Leeds United | H | 2–0 | 51,196 | Graham, Storey (pen.) |
| 18 September 1971 | Everton | A | 1–2 | 39,710 | Kennedy |
| 25 September 1971 | Leicester City | H | 3–0 | 40,201 | Radford (2), Rice |
| 2 October 1971 | Southampton | A | 1–0 | 23,738 | Simpson |
| 9 October 1971 | Newcastle United | H | 4–2 | 40,509 | Armstrong, Graham, Kennedy, Kelly |
| 16 October 1971 | Chelsea | A | 2–1 | 52,338 | Kennedy (2) |
| 23 October 1971 | Derby County | A | 1–2 | 36,480 | Graham |
| 30 October 1971 | Ipswich Town | H | 2–1 | 39,065 | George, (o.g.) |
| 6 November 1971 | Liverpool | A | 2–3 | 46,929 | Kennedy, (o.g.) |
| 13 November 1971 | Manchester City | H | 1–2 | 47,443 | Nelson |
| 20 November 1971 | Wolverhampton Wanderers | A | 1–5 | 28,851 | Kennedy |
| 24 November 1971 | Tottenham Hotspur | A | 1–1 | 52,884 | Kennedy |
| 27 November 1971 | Crystal Palace | H | 2–1 | 32,461 | Radford, Kelly |
| 4 December 1971 | West Ham United | A | 0–0 | 35,155 | |
| 11 December 1971 | Coventry City | H | 2–0 | 28,597 | Radford (2) |
| 18 December 1971 | West Bromwich Albion | H | 2–0 | 28,177 | Roberts (2) |
| 27 December 1971 | Nottingham Forest | A | 1–1 | 42,750 | Graham |
| 1 January 1972 | Everton | H | 1–1 | 47,031 | Simpson |
| 8 January 1972 | Stoke City | A | 0–0 | 18,965 | |
| 22 January 1972 | Huddersfield Town | H | 1–0 | 36,670 | Armstrong |
| 29 January 1972 | Sheffield United | A | 5–0 | 30,778 | George (2), Graham, Kennedy, Simpson |
| 12 February 1972 | Derby County | H | 2–0 | 52,055 | George (2; 1 pen.) |
| 19 February 1972 | Ipswich Town | A | 1–0 | 28,657 | George |
| 4 March 1972 | Manchester City | A | 0–2 | 44,213 | |
| 11 March 1972 | Newcastle United | A | 0–2 | 33,907 | |
| 25 March 1972 | Leeds United | A | 0–3 | 45,055 | |
| 28 March 1972 | Southampton | H | 1–0 | 27,172 | Marinello |
| 1 April 1972 | Nottingham Forest | H | 3–0 | 33,895 | George (pen.), Kennedy, Graham |
| 4 April 1972 | Leicester City | A | 0–0 | 27,431 | |
| 8 April 1972 | Wolerhampton Wanderers | H | 2–1 | 38,189 | Graham (2) |
| 11 April 1972 | Crystal Palace | A | 2–2 | 34,384 | Ball, Radford |
| 22 April 1972 | West Ham United | H | 2–1 | 42,251 | Ball (2) |
| 25 April 1972 | Manchester United | H | 3–0 | 49,125 | Kennedy, Radford, Simpson |
| 1 May 1972 | Coventry City | A | 1–0 | 23,509 | McLintock |
| 8 May 1972 | Liverpool | H | 0–0 | 39,289 | |
| 11 May 1972 | Tottenham Hotspur | H | 0–2 | 42,038 | |

=== FA Cup ===
| Round | Date | Opponent | Venue | Result | Attendance | Goalscorers |
|---|---|---|---|---|---|---|
| R3 | 15 January 1972 | Swindon Town | A | 2–0 | 32,000 | Armstrong, Ball |
| R4 | 5 February 1972 | Reading | A | 2–1 | 25,756 | Rice, (o.g.) |
| R5 | 26 February 1972 | Derby County | A | 2–2 | 39,622 | George (2) |
| R5 R | 29 February 1972 | Derby County | H | 0–0 | 63,077 | |
| R5 2R | 13 March 1972 | Derby County | N | 1–0 | 40,000 | Kennedy |
| R6 | 18 March 1972 | Orient | A | 1–0 | 31,768 | Ball |
| SF | 15 April 1972 | Stoke City | N | 1–1 | 56,576 | Armstrong |
| SF R | 19 April 1972 | Stoke City | N | 2–1 | 38,970 | George, Radford |
| F | 6 May 1972 | Leeds United | N | 0–1 | 100,000 | |

=== League Cup ===
| Round | Date | Opponent | Venue | Result | Attendance | Goalscorers |
|---|---|---|---|---|---|---|
| R2 | 8 September 1971 | Barnsley | H | 1–0 | 27,294 | Kennedy |
| R3 | 6 October 1971 | Newcastle United | H | 4–0 | 34,071 | Graham, Kennedy, Radford (2) |
| R4 | 26 October 1971 | Sheffield United | H | 0–0 | 44,061 | |
| R4 R | 8 November 1971 | Sheffield United | A | 0–2 | 35,461 | |

=== European Cup ===
| Round | Date | Opponent | Venue | Result | Attendance | Goalscorers |
|---|---|---|---|---|---|---|
| R2 L1 | 15 September 1971 | (Norway) Strømsgodset | A | 3–1 | 23,000 | Marinello, Simpson, Kelly |
| R2 L2 | 29 September 1971 | (Norway) Strømsgodset | H | 4–0 | 27,176 | Armstrong, Kennedy, Radford (2) |
| R3 | 20 October 1971 | (Switzerland) Grasshopper | A | 2–0 | 23,000 | Graham, Kennedy |
| R3 | 3 November 1971 | (Switzerland) Grasshopper | H | 3–0 | 31,105 | George, Kennedy, Radford |
| R4 | 8 March 1972 | (Netherlands) Ajax | A | 1–2 | 63,000 | Kennedy |
| R4 R | 22 March 1972 | (Netherlands) Ajax | H | 0–1 | 56,155 | |

== Squad ==
Note: Flags indicate national team as defined under FIFA eligibility rules; some limited exceptions apply. Players may hold more than one non-FIFA nationality.

| Pos. | Nation | Player |
|---|---|---|
| GK | SCO | Bob Wilson |
| GK | ENG | Geoff Barnett |
| DF | NIR | Pat Rice |
| DF | SCO | Frank McLintock |
| DF | ENG | Peter Simpson |
| DF | ENG | Bob McNab |
| DF | NIR | Sammy Nelson |
| DF | WAL | John Roberts |
| DF | ENG | Brendon Batson |
| MF | ENG | George Armstrong |
| MF | SCO | George Graham |

| Pos. | Nation | Player |
|---|---|---|
| MF | ENG | Peter Storey |
| MF | ENG | Alan Ball |
| MF | SCO | Eddie Kelly |
| FW | WAL | Paul Davies |
| FW | ENG | Ray Kennedy |
| FW | ENG | John Radford |
| FW | ENG | Charlie George |
| FW | SCO | Peter Marinello |
