= 1979–80 Liverpool F.C. season =

English football club season

Liverpool F.C.
1979–80 season
- Manager: Bob Paisley
- First Division: Champions
- European Cup: First round
- FA Cup: Semi-finals
- League Cup: Semi-finals
- FA Charity Shield: Winners
- Top goalscorer: League: David Johnson (21); All: David Johnson (27)
Home colours	Away colours	Third colours

The 1979–80 season was Liverpool Football Club's 88th season in existence and their 18th consecutive season in the First Division. Liverpool won its 12th league title, and its second in successive seasons. David Johnson was the top scorer while Kenny Dalglish, Phil Neal and Phil Thompson were regularly starting in the side. In the European Cup, there was an early disappointment with a 2-4 loss on aggregate to Dinamo Tbilisi in the first round. Liverpool went on to lose in the semi-finals of the FA Cup to the eventual runners-up, Arsenal, after a four-game marathon. They also lost in the semi-finals of the Football League Cup to the eventual runners-up, Nottingham Forest, who lost in the final to Wolverhampton Wanderers, a side captained by former Liverpool captain Emlyn Hughes, who left Liverpool before the start of the league season.

== Squad ==
=== Goalkeepers ===
- (England) Ray Clemence
- (England) Steve Ogrizovic

=== Defenders ===
- (Israel) Avi Cohen
- (England) Brian Kettle
- (England) Colin Irwin
- (England) Phil Neal
- (Scotland) Alan Hansen
- (England) Phil Thompson
- (England) Alan Kennedy
- (England) Richard Money

=== Midfielders ===
- (England) Jimmy Case
- (Republic of Ireland) Steve Heighway
- (England) Sammy Lee
- (England) Ray Kennedy
- (England) Terry McDermott
- (Republic of Ireland) Kevin Sheedy
- (Scotland) Graeme Souness

=== Attackers ===
- (England) David Fairclough
- (Scotland) Kenny Dalglish
- (England) Howard Gayle
- (England) David Johnson
- (Scotland) Frank McGarvey

== Squad statistics ==
=== Appearances and goals ===
No.	Pos	Nat	Player	Total		Division 1		FA Cup		Charity Shield		League Cup		European Cup	
No.	Pos	Nat	Player	Apps	Goals	Apps	Goals	Apps	Goals	Apps	Goals	Apps	Goals	Apps	Goals
	MF	(England) ENG	Jimmy Case	52	5	37+0	3	5+0	1	1+0	0	7+0	0	2+0	1
	GK	(England) ENG	Ray Clemence	59	0	41+0	0	8+0	0	1+0	0	7+0	0	2+0	0
	DF	(Israel) ISR	Avi Cohen	5	1	3+1	1	1+0	0	0+0	0	0+0	0	0+0	0
	FW	(Scotland) SCO	Kenny Dalglish	60	23	42+0	16	8+0	2	1+0	1	7+0	4	2+0	0
	FW	(England) ENG	David Fairclough	26	13	9+5	5	1+4	3	0+0	0	2+3	5	0+2	0
	DF	(Scotland) SCO	Alan Hansen	53	4	38+0	4	8+0	0	1+0	0	4+0	0	2+0	0
	MF	(Republic of Ireland) IRL	Steve Heighway	11	0	2+7	0	0+0	0	0+0	0	1+0	0	0+1	0
	DF	(England) ENG	Colin Irwin	14	2	7+1	2	2+0	0	0+0	0	2+0	0	2+0	0
	FW	(England) ENG	David Johnson	54	27	37+0	21	8+0	3	1+0	0	6+0	2	2+0	1
	DF	(England) ENG	Alan Kennedy	51	1	37+0	1	5+0	0	1+0	0	7+0	0	1+0	0
	MF	(England) ENG	Ray Kennedy	56	9	40+0	9	8+0	0	1+0	0	6+0	0	1+0	0
	MF	(England) ENG	Sammy Lee	11	0	6+1	0	4+0	0	0+0	0	0+0	0	0+0	0
	MF	(England) ENG	Terry McDermott	53	16	37+0	11	6+0	2	1+0	2	7+0	1	2+0	0
	DF	(England) ENG	Phil Neal	60	1	42+0	1	8+0	0	1+0	0	7+0	0	2+0	0
	GK	(England) ENG	Steve Ogrizovic	1	0	1+0	0	0+0	0	0+0	0	0+0	0	0+0	0
	MF	(Scotland) SCO	Graeme Souness	59	2	41+0	1	8+0	1	1+0	0	7+0	0	2+0	0
	DF	(England) ENG	Phil Thompson	60	1	42+0	0	8+0	0	1+0	0	7+0	1	2+0	0

== League table ==
Pos	Team	Pld	W	D	L	GF	GA	GD	Pts	Qualification or relegation
1	Liverpool (C)	42	25	10	7	81	30	+51	60	Qualification for the European Cup first round
2	Manchester United	42	24	10	8	65	35	+30	58	Qualification for the UEFA Cup first round
3	Ipswich Town	42	22	9	11	68	39	+29	53	Qualification for the UEFA Cup first round
4	Arsenal	42	18	16	8	52	36	+16	52	
5	Nottingham Forest	42	20	8	14	63	43	+20	48	Qualification for the European Cup first round (Note: Nottingham Forest qualified for the European Cup first round as the 1979–80 European Cup winners.)

Source: World Football
Rules for classification: 1) Points; 2) Goal difference; 3) Goals scored
(C) Champions

== Results ==
=== First Division ===
Date	Opponents	Venue	Result	Scorers	Attendance	Report 1	Report 2
21-Aug-79	Bolton Wanderers	H	0–0		45,900	Report	Report
25-Aug-79	West Bromwich Albion	H	3–1	Johnson 11', 58' McDermott 52'	48,021	Report	Report
01-Sep-79	Southampton	A	2–3	Johnson 16' Irwin 74'	21,402	Report	Report
08-Sep-79	Coventry City	H	4–0	Johnson 27', 90' Case 58' Dalglish 62'	39,926	Report	Report
15-Sep-79	Leeds United	A	1–1	McDermott 81'	39,779	Report	Report
22-Sep-79	Norwich City	H	0–0		44,120	Report	Report
29-Sep-79	Nottingham Forest	A	0–1		28,262	Report	Report
06-Oct-79	Bristol City	H	4–0	Johnson 3' Dalglish 30' R Kennedy 34' McDermott 80'	38,213	Report	Report
09-Oct-79	Bolton Wanderers	A	1–1	Dalglish 80'	25,571	Report	Report
13-Oct-79	Ipswich Town	A	2–1	Hunter o.g. 18' Johnson 54'	25,310	Report	Report
20-Oct-79	Everton	H	2–2	Lyons o.g. 8' R Kennedy 55'	52,201	Report	Report
27-Oct-79	Manchester City	A	4–0	Johnson 12' Dalglish 31', 67' R Kennedy 86'	48,128	Report	Report
03-Nov-79	Wolverhampton Wanderers	H	3–0	Dalglish 4', 52' R Kennedy 67'	49,541	Report	Report
10-Nov-79	Brighton & Hove Albion	A	4–1	R Kennedy 19' Dalglish 65', 83' Johnson 67'	29,682	Report	Report
17-Nov-79	Tottenham Hotspur	H	2–1	McDermott 34', 69'	51,092	Report	Report
24-Nov-79	Arsenal	A	0–0		55,561	Report	Report
01-Dec-79	Middlesbrough	H	4–0	McDermott 5' Hansen 13' Johnson 73' R Kennedy 84'	39,885	Report	Report
08-Dec-79	Aston Villa	A	3–1	R Kennedy 55' Hansen 60' McDermott 74'	41,160	Report	Report
15-Dec-79	Crystal Palace	H	3–0	Case 44' Dalglish 48' McDermott 67'	42,898	Report	Report
22-Dec-79	Derby County	A	3–1	Davies o.g. 16' McDermott 53 Pen' Johnson 55'	24,945	Report	Report
26-Dec-79	Manchester United	H	2–0	Hansen 15' Johnson 85'	51,073	Report	Report
29-Dec-79	West Bromwich Albion	A	2–0	Johnson 24', 44'	34,915	Report	Report
12-Jan-80	Southampton	H	1–1	McDermott 60 Pen'	44,655	Report	Report
19-Jan-80	Coventry City	A	0–1		31,578	Report	Report
09-Feb-80	Norwich City	A	5–3	Fairclough 4', 18', 75' Dalglish 88' Case 89'	25,624	Report	Report
19-Feb-80	Nottingham Forest	H	2–0	McDermott 80' R Kennedy 84'	45,093	Report	Report
23-Feb-80	Ipswich Town	H	1–1	Fairclough 8'	47,566	Report	Report
26-Feb-80	Wolverhampton Wanderers	A	0–1		36,693	Report	Report
01-Mar-80	Everton	A	2–1	Johnson 19' Neal 31 Pen'	53,013	Report	Report
11-Mar-80	Manchester City	H	2–0	Caton o.g. 56' Souness 83'	40,443	Report	Report
15-Mar-80	Bristol City	A	3–1	R Kennedy 5' Dalglish 55', 89'	27,187	Report	Report
19-Mar-80	Leeds United	H	3–0	Johnson 33', 80' A Kennedy 60'	37,008	Report	Report
22-Mar-80	Brighton & Hove Albion	H	1–0	Hansen 70'	42,747	Report	Report
29-Mar-80	Tottenham Hotspur	A	0–2		32,114	Report	Report
01-Apr-80	Stoke City	H	1–0	Dalglish 34'	36,415	Report	Report
05-Apr-80	Manchester United	A	1–2	Dalglish 14'	57,342	Report	Report
08-Apr-80	Derby County	H	3–0	Irwin 20' Johnson 50' Osgood o.g. 83'	40,932	Report	Report
19-Apr-80	Arsenal	H	1–1	Dalglish 12'	46,878	Report	Report
23-Apr-80	Stoke City	A	2–0	Johnson 34' Fairclough 60'	32,000	Report	Report
26-Apr-80	Crystal Palace	A	0–0		45,583	Report	Report
03-May-80	Aston Villa	H	4–1	Johnson 3', 72' Cohen 50' Blake o.g. 78'	51,541	Report	Report
06-May-80	Middlesbrough	A	0–1		24,458	Report	Report

=== FA Charity Shield ===
11 August 1979

Liverpool	3–1	Arsenal
McDermott 38' 65'; Dalglish 63'	Report	Sunderland 88'

Wembley Stadium, London
Attendance: 92,000

Liverpool	Arsenal

Liverpool:
GK	1	(England) Ray Clemence
DF	2	(England) Phil Neal
DF	3	(England) Alan Kennedy
DF	4	(England) Phil Thompson
MF	5	(England) Ray Kennedy
DF	6	(Scotland) Alan Hansen
FW	7	(Scotland) Kenny Dalglish
MF	8	(England) Jimmy Case
FW	9	(England) David Johnson
MF	10	(England) Terry McDermott
MF	11	(Scotland) Graeme Souness
Substitutes:
MF	12	(Republic of Ireland) Steve Heighway
MF	13	(England) Sammy Lee
DF	14	(Israel) Avi Cohen
FW	15	(England) David Fairclough
GK	16	(England) Steve Ogrizovic
Manager:
(England) Bob Paisley

Arsenal
GK	1	(Northern Ireland) Pat Jennings
DF	2	(England) Pat Rice
DF	3	(Northern Ireland) Sammy Nelson	Substituted off
MF	4	(England) Brian Talbot
DF	5	(Republic of Ireland) David O'Leary
DF	6	(England) Steve Walford
MF	7	(Republic of Ireland) Liam Brady
FW	8	(England) Alan Sunderland
FW	9	(Republic of Ireland) Frank Stapleton
MF	10	(England) David Price	Substituted off
MF	11	(England) Graham Rix
Substitutes:
DF		(Scotland) Willie Young	Substituted in
MF		(England) John Hollins	Substituted in
Manager:
(Northern Ireland) Terry Neill

Match rules

- 90 minutes, no extra time
- Five named substitutes
- Maximum of three substitutions

=== FA Cup ===
Date	Opponents	Venue	Result	Scorers	Attendance	Report 1	Report 2
05-Jan-80	Grimsby Town	H	5–0	Souness 19' Johnson 42', 65', 74' Case 87'	49,706	Report	Report
26-Jan-80	Nottingham Forest	A	2–0	Dalglish 31' McDermott 71 Pen'	33,277	Report	Report
16-Feb-80	Bury	H	2–0	Fairclough 64', 81'	43,769	Report	Report
08-Mar-80	Tottenham Hotspur	A	1–0	McDermott 38'	48,033	Report	Report
12-Apr-80	Arsenal	N	0–0		50,174	Report	Report
16-Apr-80	Arsenal	N	1–1	Fairclough 51'	40,679	Report	Report
28-Apr-80	Arsenal	N	1–1	Dalglish 90'	42,975	Report	Report
01-May-80	Arsenal	N	0–1		35,335	Report	Report

=== League Cup ===
Date	Opponents	Venue	Result	Scorers	Attendance	Report 1	Report 2
29-Aug-79	Tranmere Rovers	A	0–0		16,759	Report	Report
04-Sep-79	Tranmere Rovers	H	4–0	Thompson 46' Dalglish 49', 75' Fairclough 83'	24,785	Report	Report
25-Sep-79	Chesterfield	H	3–1	Fairclough 10' Dalglish 34' McDermott 80'	20,960	Report	Report
30-Oct-79	Exeter City	H	2–0	Fairclough 60', 90'	21,019	Report	Report
05-Dec-79	Norwich City	A	3–1	Johnson 11', 31' Dalglish 37'	23,000	Report	Report
22-Jan-80	Nottingham Forest	A	0–1		32,234	Report	Report
12-Feb-80	Nottingham Forest	H	1–1	Fairclough 89' (semi-final, second leg)	50,880	Report	Report

=== European Cup ===
Date	Opponents	Venue	Result	Scorers	Attendance	Report 1	Report 2
19-Sep-79	Dinamo Tbilisi	H	2–1	Johnson 19' Case 44'	35,720	Report	Report
03-Oct-79	Dinamo Tbilisi	A	0–3		80,000	Report	Report
