= Ray Kennedy =

English footballer (1951–2021)

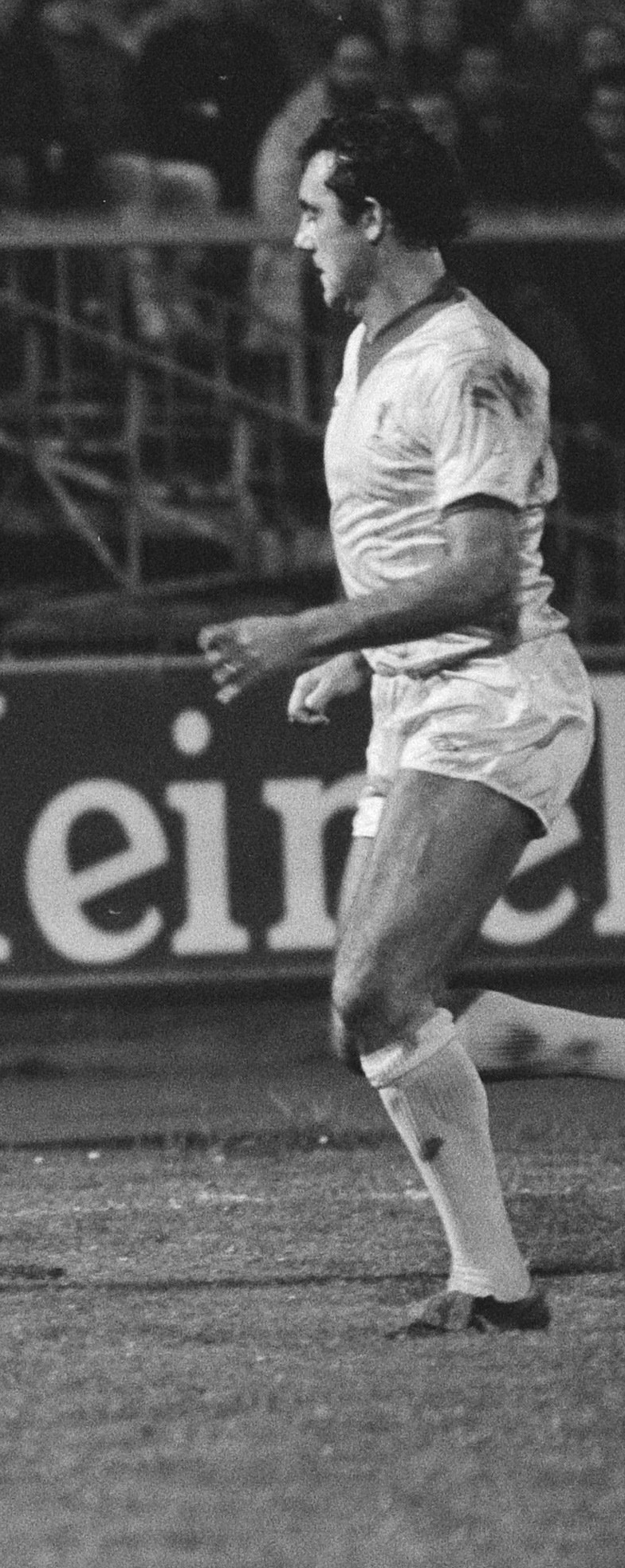
- Kennedy playing with Liverpool in 1981

Personal information
- Full name: Raymond Kennedy
- Date of birth: 28 July 1951
- Place of birth: Seaton Delaval, Northumberland, England
- Date of death: 30 November 2021 (aged 70)
- Height: 5 ft 11 in (1.80 m)
- Positions: Midfielder; centre-forward

Youth career
- 1966–1967: Port Vale
- 1967–1968: New Hartley Juniors
- 1968: Arsenal

Senior career*
Years	Team	Apps	(Gls)
1968–1974	Arsenal	158	(53)
1974–1982	Liverpool	275	(51)
1982–1983	Swansea City	41	(2)
1983–1984	Hartlepool United	23	(3)
1984–1985	Pezoporikos		
1985	Ashington		
Total		497	(109)

International career
1972–1973	England U23	6	(0)
1976–1980	England	17	(3)

Managerial career
- 1984–1985: Pezoporikos (player-manager)
- * Club domestic league appearances and goals

Raymond Kennedy (28 July 1951 – 30 November 2021) was an English footballer who won every domestic honour in the game with Arsenal and Liverpool in the 1970s and early 1980s. Kennedy played as a forward for Arsenal and then played as a left-sided midfielder for Liverpool. He scored 148 goals in 680 league and cup appearances in a 15-year career in the English Football League. Also, he won 17 caps for England between 1976 and 1980, scoring three international goals.

Kennedy turned professional for Arsenal in November 1968. He made his first-team debut 10 months later and went on to win the Inter-Cities Fairs Cup in 1970, the First Division and FA Cup Double in 1970–71, and then play on the losing side in the 1972 FA Cup final. His form then declined, and he was sold to Liverpool for a club record £200,000 fee in July 1974, at the same time that Bill Shankly resigned as manager. He initially struggled at the club, but after manager Bob Paisley converted him to a left-sided midfielder, he went on to help Liverpool become the dominant club in English football from 1975 to 1982. During his time at the club Liverpool won the First Division five times (1975–76, 1976–77, 1978–79, 1979–80, and 1981–82), the FA Charity Shield four times (1976, 1977, 1979 and 1980), the European Cup three times, (1977, 1978, and 1981), and the UEFA Cup (1976), UEFA Super Cup (1977), and League Cup (1981). He also picked up runners-up medals in the FA Cup (1977), UEFA Super Cup (1978), League Cup (1978), and World Club Championship (1981) and won the Match of the Day's Goal of the Season award in 1978–79.

He was a strong player with an excellent first touch, intelligence, and all-round ability. This allowed him to transition from a forward to a midfielder at Liverpool. Despite his trophy successes with Arsenal and Liverpool, after winning six caps for the England under-23 side, he could not translate his club form into a good international career. He was used as a stand-in for Trevor Brooking before he retired from international football in frustration in March 1981. His only international tournament appearance was at Euro 1980. Bob Paisley described him as "one of Liverpool's greatest players and probably the most underrated".

Kennedy joined Swansea City for a £160,000 fee in January 1982 and added a Welsh Cup winners medal to his collection four months later. However, the effects of Parkinson's disease began to reduce his effectiveness on the pitch, and he dropped into the Fourth Division with Hartlepool United in November 1983. During the 1984–85 season, he spent a brief time as player-manager of Cyprus club Pezoporikos and later played for Northern League club Ashington. He was diagnosed with Parkinson's disease in November 1984. His life after football was difficult, as he had to deal with the effects of Parkinson's, the loss of his business, and the breakdown of his 15-year marriage. He remained reliant on charity to fund his medical expenses and was forced to sell his medal collection and caps in 1993.

== Club career ==
Ray Kennedy was born on 28 July 1951 in Seaton Delaval, a former pit village in Northumberland, to Martin and Veronica Kennedy, a coal miner and housewife, respectively. He was the eldest of four children: Trevor, Michael, and Janet. He was spotted playing schoolboy football by a scout at Port Vale and began training at Vale Park after manager Stanley Matthews came to the Kennedy home to persuade him to sign schoolboy forms at the club. However, at the age of 16 Matthews felt Kennedy was "too slow to be a footballer". Kennedy was considered to be too big and clumsy to be a professional, and groundskeeper Dennis Dawson said he was the only man at the club to see any potential in the youngster. The club released him after being told that he would never make it as a professional.

Kennedy returned to his native north-east in March 1967 and started working in a sweet factory whilst playing as an amateur for New Hartley Juniors, where he built a successful attacking partnership with former England schoolboy international Ian Watts. The pair scored 142 goals between them and helped the club to win the East Northumberland Junior League, the Northumberland FA Junior Cup, the East Northumberland Junior League Cup, the North East Youth Challenge Cup, the East Northumberland Junior League Charlton Trophy, the Tynemouth Junior League Challenge Cup and the Magpie Trophy.

=== Arsenal ===
Kennedy was spotted by Arsenal playing for New Hartley Juniors. Though the scouts had initially gone to the game to watch his striker partner, Watts, Kennedy had impressed enough to win an apprentice contract with Arsenal in May 1968. He then signed professional forms with the club in November 1968. He had a difficult task though to win a first-team place, as manager Bertie Mee used only 15 players throughout the entire 1968–69 season, during which time Kennedy made 20 appearances for the Reserve team as they claimed the Football Combination Division One title.

He made his first-team debut on 29 September 1969, against Glentoran in the Inter-Cities Fairs Cup and his First Division debut as a substitute on 18 October, a 1–1 draw with Sunderland at Roker Park. He scored his first goal for the Gunners in the reverse fixture against Sunderland at Highbury, which ended in a 3–1 win. He went on to appear as a 77th-minute substitute in the first leg of the Inter-Cities Fairs Cup final against Belgian club Anderlecht at Constant Vanden Stock Stadium, and scored a late goal in a 3–1 defeat. Though he did not appear in the second leg, his goal proved to be decisive as Arsenal claimed a 4–3 aggregate victory to win the first European trophy in the club's history.

Charlie George broke his ankle on the opening game of the 1970–71 season, and Kennedy replaced him as John Radford's strike partner for the following game and went on to feature in the remaining league fixtures of the campaign as Arsenal went on to be crowned champions. They exited the Inter-Cities Fairs Cup with a defeat to the German side 1. FC Köln at the quarter-final stage, though after their draw with Lazio in the first round Kennedy was attacked by some of the Lazio players in an Italian restaurant, and in the ensuing brawl, police pulled a gun on teammate Eddie Kelly; Kennedy later said the Lazio players targeted him due to his "cheeky face". Back in the league, he scored his first hat-trick in victory over Nottingham Forest. However, he admitted after the match that he was "still expecting to be dropped any minute". Arsenal overtook Leeds United to win the league title on the final day of the season, Kennedy scoring the only goal of the game with a late header in a 1–0 victory over North London derby rivals Tottenham Hotspur at White Hart Lane. In the FA Cup, Arsenal progressed past Yeovil Town, Portsmouth (following a replay), Manchester City, Leicester City (following a replay), and Stoke City (following a replay), before meeting Liverpool in the final at Wembley Stadium. Liverpool led early in extra time, but goals from George Graham and Charlie George won the game for Arsenal. They secured only the fourth Double in English football. Kennedy had missed some good chances throughout the match, though he later pointed out that "nobody really remembers anything bad if you win".

Arsenal endured a poor start to the 1971–72 season, and as a result, Mee purchased Alan Ball from Everton for £220,000. They went on to go 14 games unbeaten over the winter, closing the gap on leaders Manchester City to four points. They were knocked out of the European Cup at the quarter-final stage by eventual winners Ajax. They ended the season in fifth place, and gifted Derby County the league title by denying Liverpool what would have proved to be a decisive victory on the penultimate day of the season. Arsenal returned to Wembley to defend the FA Cup, but lost 1–0 to Leeds United; Kennedy had lost his first-team place late in the season after fatigue began to affect his form, and was only named as a substitute for the final before he came on for Radford after 73 minutes. He scored 19 goals in 55 appearances to finish as the club's top goalscorer for the second successive season.

He struggled at the start of the 1972–73 season, his confidence and form suffered as defenders marked him more closely and poor diet saw his weight rise to over 14 stone (200 lb; 89 kg). Captain Frank McLintock remarked to the management that Kennedy was only operating at 60% capacity. Kennedy was fined £200 before he began to shed weight and rediscover his form. Arsenal finished the season in second place, and he scored just nine league goals throughout the campaign. Arsenal reached the semi-finals of the FA Cup, where Sunderland beat them.

Arsenal dropped into mid-table throughout the 1973–74 season, with McLintock's departure signalling the demise of the Double-winning team. Kennedy failed to score from 6 October to mid-January, and speculation rose of possible moves to Sunderland, Newcastle United, or Aston Villa. In February, he released a statement saying that "my game has gone downhill since I got married but has started to pick up again now I am in bachelordom... I feel that I am better off without her". He ended the season in good form, though Mee had already decided to move him on and replace him with Brian Kidd.

I couldn't believe it when he left and felt it was a great shame to have broken up our partnership which had wobbled slightly but which I was sure would come together again with a little time.

— Strike partner John Radford was particularly disappointed to see that Kennedy was sold on, and himself would leave the club in December 1976 after 12 seasons in the Arsenal first team.

=== Liverpool ===
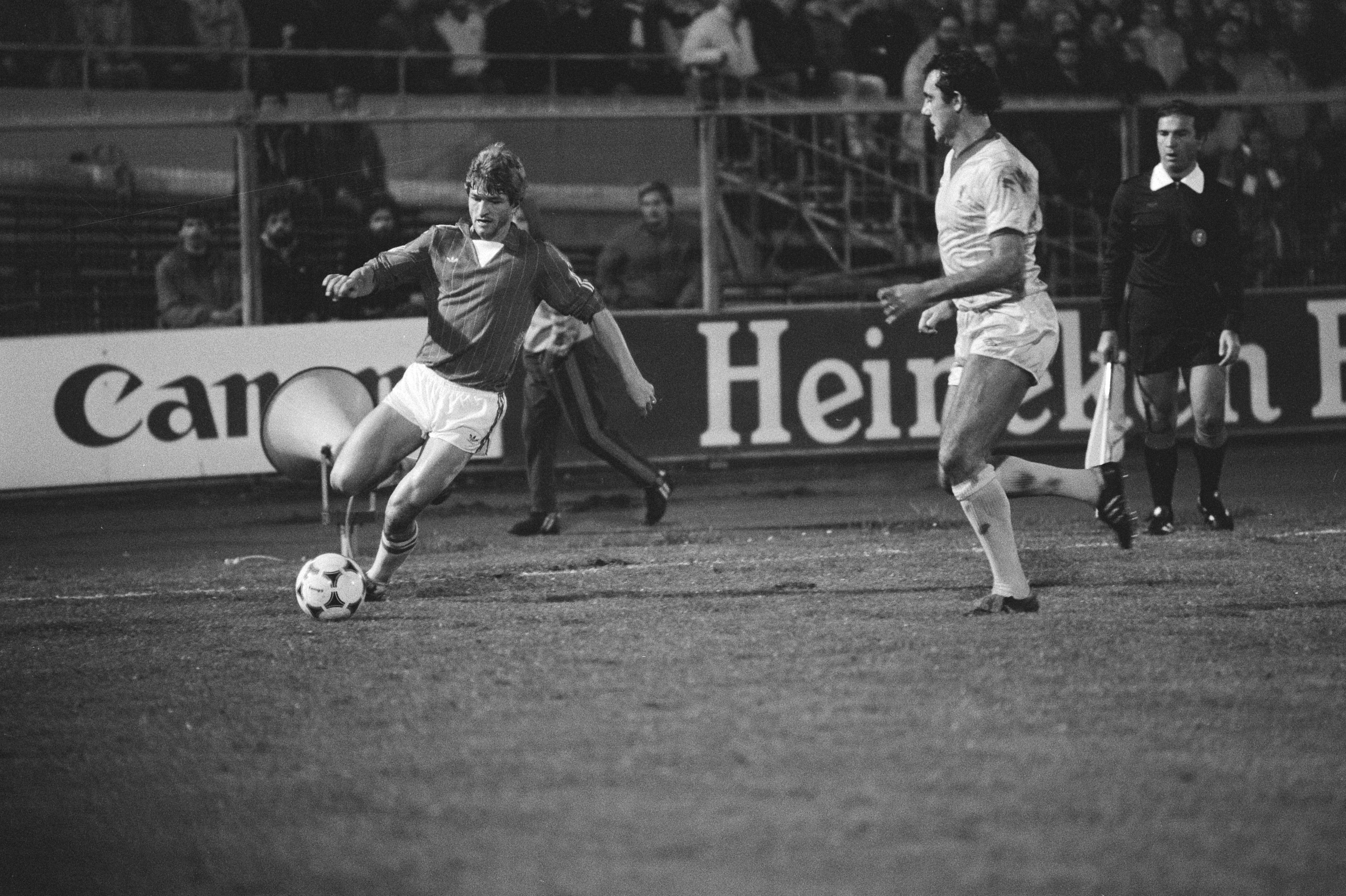
Kennedy (right) defending against AZ's Jan Peters in October 1981. This would be his final season playing for Liverpool, as he was sold to Swansea City in January 1982.

In July 1974, Kennedy was sold to Liverpool for a club record £200,000. Manager Bill Shankly resigned on the same day as the transfer was made, though had admired Kennedy for years and stated that "maybe it will be said that one of the last things I did at this club was to sign a great new player". Shortly after the move Kennedy got back in touch with his estranged wife. The pair began living together in Ainsdale. New manager Bob Paisley handed Kennedy his debut in place of John Toshack against Chelsea at Stamford Bridge on 31 August 1974. It took Kennedy 22 minutes to open his goalscoring account as the Reds recorded a comfortable 3–0 win. Liverpool ended the 1974–75 season as runners-up to Derby County in the league. Kennedy featured just 25 times in the league as Toshack formed an effective combination with Kevin Keegan up front and started to become frustrated and disillusioned in the club.

Bob Paisley felt Kennedy could perform as a midfielder. After Kennedy replaced an injured Peter Cormack against Middlesbrough on 1 November, he went on to make the number five shirt his own for the rest of the decade. His new position allowed him to use his vision and distribution to create chances for his teammates whilst still allowing him to make runs into scoring positions to add goals himself. Liverpool won the league title in 1975–76 with a final day victory over Wolverhampton Wanderers to beat Queens Park Rangers into second place. They also secured the UEFA Cup, knocking out Hibernian (Scotland), Real Sociedad (Spain), Śląsk Wrocław (Poland), Dynamo Dresden (Germany), and Barcelona (Spain), before facing Belgian side Club Brugge in the final. Liverpool were losing 2–0 in the first leg of the final at Anfield before Kennedy scored the first of Liverpool's three goals to overturn the deficit; in the return leg at the Olympiastadion, Liverpool drew 1–1 to win the tie 4–3 on aggregate.

Liverpool opened the new season by claiming the 1976 FA Charity Shield with a 1–0 win over Southampton and went on to win the league largely on their home form, Kennedy's goal in a 2–1 win over title contenders Ipswich Town on 30 April proving to be decisive. Though Liverpool failed to win any of their last four league matches, they finished one point clear of Manchester City in second. Liverpool won the European Super Cup with a comprehensive 7–1 victory over German club Hamburg. Liverpool also reached the 1977 FA Cup final but lost the chance to follow Arsenal's feat at achieving the Double as they were beaten 2–1 by bitter rivals Manchester United. In the European Cup, Liverpool beat Crusaders (Northern Ireland), Trabzonspor (Turkey), AS Saint-Étienne (France), and FC Zürich (Switzerland) to reach the final against German side Borussia Mönchengladbach. In the final at Rome's Stadio Olimpico, Keegan was fouled by Vogts and won a late penalty which Phil Neal converted to give Liverpool a 3–1 victory.

Following a 0–0 draw with Manchester United in the 1977 FA Charity Shield, a disappointing start to the 1977–78 season saw Liverpool out of the title race early on whilst they exited the FA Cup at the third round. They did, though, recover to post a second-place finish in the league after winning nine of their last 12 matches to end the campaign seven points behind Nottingham Forest. They progressed to the League Cup final after Kennedy scored the winning goal past former club Arsenal in the semi-final. However, Liverpool lost out 1–0 to Nottingham Forest in the replay of the final at Old Trafford. Despite these domestic disappointments, Liverpool went on to reach the final of the European Cup after defeating Dynamo Dresden, Benfica (Portugal), and Borussia Mönchengladbach; Mönchengladbach manager Udo Lattek singled out Kennedy as the best player of the semi-final, as Kennedy scored a goal and provided assists for both Kenny Dalglish and Jimmy Case in the second leg. In the final, Liverpool faced Club Brugge at Wembley and successfully defended the trophy after seeing out a 1–0 win.

Liverpool's chances of winning a third successive European Cup were ended with a defeat to Nottingham Forest in the first round. However, they opened the league campaign with six straight wins and dominated the league by finishing eight points clear of second-placed Forest, scoring 85 goals and conceding just 16 in the process. His goal against Derby County on 24 February won him Match of the Day's Goal of the Season award. Writing in his autobiography, Paisley named the 1978–79 team as the best championship team he had been associated with during his 40 years with the club. Manchester United again denied them the chance to win the Double, however, as United knocked Liverpool out of the semi-finals of the FA Cup following a replay at Goodison Park. Liverpool also lost the 1978 European Super Cup, following a 4–3 aggregate defeat to Anderlecht.

Liverpool won the 1979 FA Charity Shield with a 3–1 victory over Kennedy's former club Arsenal, but a knee ligament injury caused Kennedy to miss a small number of games early in the season. Kennedy also felt that left-back Alan Kennedy was not up to the required standard, saying, "he took five years off my career... Alan had no nerves and not much brain... we didn't gel on the pitch". Alan blamed nerves for his difficulty in finding Kennedy with accurate passes. Kennedy also began to face problems off the pitch, resulting in both he and Jimmy Case being arrested after they attacked a hotelier who had confused Kennedy with his namesake Alan. The pair pleaded guilty to affray and were fined £150 each; despite this and other similar incidents, Kennedy did manage to avoid his off-field antics affecting his form or discipline on the pitch. Kennedy later said "it was a good friendship" but "we were bad for each other". Liverpool finished two points clear of second-place Manchester United in the league, with Kennedy claiming nine goals in 56 appearances. They also reached the semi-finals of the FA Cup, where they were beaten by Arsenal in a replay following three draws in two replays and the original tie. In the summer, Kennedy signed a new four-year contract with the club.

Liverpool retained the Charity Shield by beating West Ham United 1–0; however, despite only losing eight league games all season they won 17 and drew 17 of their remaining fixtures and ended the 1980–81 season in fifth place, nine points behind champions Aston Villa. In the League Cup, they knocked out Bradford City, Swindon Town, Portsmouth, Birmingham City, and Manchester City to reach the final against West Ham United. They then beat West Ham 2–1 in a replay of the final to claim the first League Cup in the club's history. They also reached the European Cup final after getting past Oulun Palloseura (Finland), Aberdeen (Scotland), CSKA Sofia (Bulgaria), and Bayern Munich (Germany). In the semi-final against Bayern, Kennedy was named as captain as both Graeme Souness and Phil Thompson were injured and went on to score what proved to be the winning away goal at the Olympiastadion, cementing his reputation as a semi-final specialist. Liverpool then beat Spanish club Real Madrid 1–0 in a dour final to win a third European Cup.

Following the sale of Jimmy Case, Kennedy began to become disillusioned with Liverpool and was sent off twice in the space of a few weeks early in the 1981–82 season – the first red cards of his career. He made his final league appearance for the club on 5 December, when he scored in a 2–0 win over Nottingham Forest at the City Ground. His final cup game for the club came eight days later, in a 3–0 defeat to Brazilian side Flamengo in the 1981 Intercontinental Cup at Tokyo's National Stadium. He was replaced in the team by Ronnie Whelan. Liverpool went on to win the league title after finishing four points ahead of second-place Ipswich Town, and Kennedy's 15 league appearances in the first half of the campaign were enough to earn him another league championship medal. Sunderland attempted to sign him on loan in January 1982 but were denied by Liverpool, and Kennedy could not agree on personal terms with manager Alan Durban so was not signed by Sunderland on a permanent transfer.

"Ray's contribution to Liverpool's achievements was enormous and his consistency remarkable. So much so, in fact, that on the rare occasions he missed a match his absence was felt deeply simply because he was a midfield power house with tremendous vision and knowledge of the game... In my view he was one of Liverpool's greatest players and probably the most underrated."

— Paisley paid tribute to Kennedy in his 1983 autobiography.

=== Later career ===
In January 1982, Kennedy was signed by Swansea City on a four-year contract for a £160,000 fee to play under former teammate John Toshack. The Swans had an unsuccessful attempt to win the league title, and five defeats in their final six games saw them end up in sixth place, 17 points behind champions Liverpool. They did though win the Welsh Cup after beating South Wales derby rivals Cardiff City 2–1 in the final at Vetch Field. Despite voicing his concerns over the team and his own future at the club to Toshack, Kennedy was appointed club captain for the 1982–83 season. He became injured with niggling hamstring problems in mid-season, and after one increasingly rare performance the local press described him as seemingly "unwilling to work and his usual composure on the ball was lacking". Kennedy's declining physical abilities were due to Parkinson's disease. However, he would not be diagnosed with the condition until after his retirement. Toshack stripped Kennedy of the captaincy and suspended him from Vetch Field for two weeks. He was placed on the transfer list in March 1983, and Swansea went on to be relegated into the Second Division. The club's financial problems worsened, and players were asked to take a cut in wages to help ease the crisis, but Kennedy refused. Toshack was sacked in October 1983, and Kennedy agreed to have his contract terminated.

Kennedy signed with Mick Docherty's Hartlepool United of the Fourth Division in November 1983. Docherty was sacked the following month, and unsuccessfully attempted to report the club for negotiating an illegal contract with Kennedy. His assistant, Billy Horner, stepped up to manage the club for a second time in the face of a mounting financial crisis. Hartlepool were forced to apply for re-election at the end of the season, and Kennedy was promoted to player-coach for his help in boosting support for the club's re-election campaign. However, he left Victoria Park in summer 1984 to take up the position as player-manager of Cypriot side Pezoporikos. He became increasingly unable to play the game though due to his body's physical decline, and after a poor start to the 1984–85 season he returned to England in December against the board's wishes and handed in his resignation the following month, to allow him to run the Melton Constable public house in Seaton Sluice, Whitley Bay. In January 1985, he joined Northern League side Ashington, managed by former teammate Colin Todd, but could only manage six appearances after suffering from increasingly alarming stiffness in his right leg due to his worsening Parkinson's disease. Unable to turn out for his own Melton Constable Sunday League team, he soon found daily life difficult to cope with.

== International career ==
Kennedy won six England under-23 caps, following his first appearance in a win over Wales at the County Ground on 5 January 1972.

Don Revie gave Kennedy his first cap on 24 March 1976 in a friendly with Wales at the Racecourse Ground, Wrexham; Kennedy scored the opening goal as England won the game 2–1. However, he was never able to establish himself as England's left-sided midfielder of choice due to the form of Trevor Brooking. He played in British Home Championship games against Wales, Northern Ireland and Scotland, before he was dropped for the next seven games. He travelled with the squad for the 1977 tour of South America, and also that year claimed two more international goals in qualifying games against Luxembourg. He then dropped out of the England picture under new manager Ron Greenwood. He was named in the squad for UEFA Euro 1980 in Italy, playing against Belgium and Italy before he was dropped for England's final group game against Spain. He retired from international football on 17 caps in March 1981, citing dissatisfaction with the England hierarchy. Liverpool manager Bob Paisley wrote in his autobiography that "for England he [Kennedy] was played quite wrongly in a defensive role, being asked to pick people up. Ray closes people down by positional skill and does not need to chase around the pitch". Kennedy stated that "I feel more pride in the red jersey of Liverpool than the white shirt of England" and that "I am resigning here and now as Greenwood's bridesmaid".

== Style of play ==
Kennedy was a strong player with average speed, good technical ability, and an excellent first touch. Arsenal coach Don Howe compared Kennedy to Tommy Lawton, and stated that Kennedy had "all the hallmarks of a classical centre forward, size, strength, bravery and skill, heading ability and a powerful left-foot shot". He had a good temperament and could not be provoked by harsh opposition challenges. A psychological examination conducted on behalf of Arsenal revealed that Kennedy rated highly for his ability to respond to coaching; was rated above average for aggressiveness, determination, guilt-proneness (accepting responsibility for the team); was scored average for drive/ambition, self-confidence, emotional control, and mental toughness; and scored below average for leadership, conscientiousness, and trust.

Arsenal goalkeeper Bob Wilson said that Kennedy "had an alarming lack of self esteem... but there was an underlying fearsome strength, an assassin's eye and a hard-man interior". After Liverpool manager Bob Paisley moved Kennedy into midfield, he said that "Ray Kennedy was born to play. A natural, great ability and an obvious Liverpool player who could be moulded. I knew he could play anywhere." He showed minor signs of Parkinson's disease as early as 1970, such as fatigue after games and slowed movement in his right arm, though it was not until 1982 that it began to have a noticeable effect on his game.

== Later life ==
Kennedy was diagnosed with Parkinson's disease by a specialist on 4 November 1984. He permitted his image to be used to promote a public campaign to increase awareness of the disease. His involvement in the Parkinson's Disease Society led to him meeting his childhood hero Muhammad Ali. He was also invited to do some coaching at Sunderland in the 1986–87 season by manager Lawrie McMenemy, and worked as a part-time coach from February to April 1987. At this point, he was promoted to first-team coach.

His wife, Jennifer, left him in October 1987 after he punched her in the face and kicked her down the stairs of the family home; this ended a difficult 15-year marriage blighted by frequent infidelity on his part. They had two children: Cara (born July 1976) and Dale (born January 1981). Former Liverpool teammate Ray Clemence recalled how Kennedy "worked hard and played hard". Other teammates Steve Heighway and Phil Thompson noted that Kennedy was a "quiet man", though "women were always chasing after him" and "off the pitch he needed to be handled quite gently, and everything had to be organised just right otherwise there would be trouble". Completing a bad end to 1987, his licence at the Melton Constable was revoked. His prescribed L-DOPA medication also became less effective and he became increasingly isolated. His condition improved when he began injections of apomorphine. He was reliant on the Professional Footballers' Association to pay his medical expenses, and his divorce as well as business and tax problems wiped out his savings. A testimonial match was held between Arsenal and Liverpool in April 1991. A charity appeal was also set up to help pay his living costs. In late 1992 he began suffering from extreme paranoia, mostly due to the side effects of his medication, but regained his mental faculties following a short stay in hospital.

He published his autobiography Ray of Hope in 1993, co-authored by Dr. Andrew Lees, who at that time treated Kennedy for Parkinson's disease. Later that year he sold his collection of medals and international caps to raise funds. In 2002, he was reported as living alone in a bungalow in New Hartley. In an interview two years later, he said that he suffered from loneliness and hallucinations due to his condition and the side effects of his medication. Following the interview a Liverpool fan bought Kennedy a computer, which allowed him to make friends on football chat rooms. Kennedy remained a favourite amongst Liverpool supporters decades after leaving the club, and was voted in at No. 25 on the 2013 poll '100 Players Who Shook The Kop'. He died on 30 November 2021, at the age of 70.

== Career statistics ==
=== Club ===
Appearances and goals by club, season and competition
Club	Season	League			FA Cup		Other		Total	
Club	Season	Division	Apps	Goals	Apps	Goals	Apps	Goals	Apps	Goals
Arsenal	1969–70	First Division	4	1	0	0	2	1	6	2
Arsenal	1970–71	First Division	41	19	9	2	13	5	63	26
Arsenal	1971–72	First Division	37	12	8	1	10	6	55	19
Arsenal	1972–73	First Division	34	9	8	2	1	0	43	11
Arsenal	1973–74	First Division	42	12	3	1	1	0	46	13
Arsenal	Total		158	53	28	6	27	12	213	71
Liverpool	1974–75	First Division	25	5	0	0	8	5	33	10
Liverpool	1975–76	First Division	30	6	2	0	11	4	43	10
Liverpool	1976–77	First Division	41	7	8	1	12	1	61	9
Liverpool	1977–78	First Division	41	4	1	0	19	3	61	7
Liverpool	1978–79	First Division	42	10	7	1	5	0	54	11
Liverpool	1979–80	First Division	40	9	8	0	8	0	56	9
Liverpool	1980–81	First Division	41	8	2	1	19	4	62	13
Liverpool	1981–82	First Division	15	2	0	0	8	1	23	3
Liverpool	Total		275	51	28	3	90	18	393	72
Swansea City	1981–82	First Division	17	2	0	0	0	0	17	2
Swansea City	1982–83	First Division	21	0	0	0	7	0	28	0
Swansea City	1983–84	Second Division	3	0	0	0	2	0	5	0
Swansea City	Total		41	2	0	0	9	0	50	2
Hartlepool United	1983–84	Fourth Division	23	3	0	0	1	0	24	3
Career total			497	109	56	9	127	30	680	148

=== International ===
Appearances and goals by national team and year
National team	Year	Apps	Goals
England	1976	4	1
England	1977	7	2
England	1978	0	0
England	1979	1	0
England	1980	5	0
Total		17	3

== Honours ==
Arsenal

- Football League First Division: 1970–71
- FA Cup: 1970–71; runner-up: 1971–72
- Inter-Cities Fairs Cup: 1969–70

Liverpool

- Football League First Division: 1975–76, 1976–77, 1978–79, 1979–80, 1981–82
- Football League Cup: 1980–81; runner-up: 1977–78
- FA Charity Shield: 1976, 1977 (shared), 1979, 1980
- European Cup: 1976–77, 1977–78, 1980–81
- UEFA Cup: 1975–76
- UEFA Super Cup: 1977; runner-up: 1978
- FA Cup runner-up: 1976–77
- World Club Championship runner-up: 1981

Swansea City

- Welsh Cup: 1982

Individual

- BBC Goal of the Season: 1978–79
