= Yevheniy Izdebskyi =

Ukrainian footballer

Personal information
- Full name: Yevheniy Olehovych Izdebskyi
- Date of birth: 3 June 1995 (age 31)
- Place of birth: Kherson, Ukraine
- Height: 1.82 m (5 ft 11 1/2 in)
- Position: Defender

Team information
- Current team: Biali Sądów

Youth career
- 2008–2010: Krystal Kherson
- 2010–2012: Metalurh Zaporizhya

Senior career*
Years	Team	Apps	(Gls)
2012–2015	Metalurh Zaporizhya	4	(0)
2016	Enerhiya Nova Kakhovka	11	(0)
2016–2017	Metalurh Zaporizhya	14	(0)
2017–2018	Myr Hornostayivka	22	(0)
2018–2019	Motor Zaporizhzhia	7	(0)
2019	Kramfors-Alliansen	17	(0)
2019	Tavria-Skif Rozdol	0	(0)
2020	Sparta Węgorzyno	1	(0)
2020–2021	Hutnik Szczecin	31	(1)
2021–2025	Mirand Iskierka Szczecin	80	(6)
2025	Ina Ińsko	6	(1)
2026–	Biali Sądów	0	(0)
- * Club domestic league appearances and goals as of 22:40, 19 February 2026 (UTC)

Yevheniy Olehovych Izdebskyi (Ukrainian: Євгеній Олегович Іздебський; born 3 June 1995) is a Ukrainian footballer who plays as a defender for Polish IV liga West Pomerania club Biali Sądów.

== Career ==
Izdebskyi is a product of Krystal Kherson and Metalurh Zaporizhya youth systems. His first trainers were I. Zhosan, Ihor Paskhal, Oleksandr Chornyavskyi (in Podillya) and Oleksandr Rudyka (in Metalurh).

Izdebskyi made his Ukrainian Premier League debut for Metalurh against Zorya Luhansk on 7 November 2015.

== Honours ==
Mirand Iskierka Szczecin

- Regional league West Pomerania II: 2021–22

Ina Ińsko

- Regional league West Pomerania IV: 2024–25
