= Colin Irwin =

Colin Irwin may refer to:

- Colin Irwin (footballer) (born 1957), 1980s footballer
- Colin Irwin (journalist), music journalist
