= 1978–79 Liverpool F.C. season =

English football club season

Liverpool F.C.
1978–79 season
- Manager: Bob Paisley
- First Division: Champions
- European Cup: First round
- FA Cup: Semi-finals
- League Cup: Second round
- European Super Cup: Runners-up
- Top goalscorer: League: Kenny Dalglish (21); All: Kenny Dalglish (25)
Home colours	Away colours

The 1978–79 season was Liverpool Football Club's 87th season in existence and their 17th consecutive season in the First Division. Liverpool won its 11th league title with a record-breaking season. They amassed a record points total of 68, with Kenny Dalglish and Graeme Souness as commanding influences in the team that had the highest goal scoring ratio under Bob Paisley's management. Defensively, Liverpool conceded only 16 goals (just four of them at Anfield) and goalkeeper Ray Clemence kept a total of 28 clean sheets in 42 League matches. Disappointing for Liverpool was the early exit of the European Cup, losing to domestic rivals Nottingham Forest in the inaugural round; Forest went on to win the European Cup along with the League Cup, and were proving to be Liverpool's most fierce competitors as the decade drew to a close. This ended Liverpool's chances of taking three European Cups in a row, an achievement only Real Madrid, Ajax and Bayern Munich have ever succeeded in doing.

== Squad ==
=== Goalkeepers ===
- (England) Ray Clemence
- (England) Steve Ogrizovic

=== Defenders ===
- (England) Emlyn Hughes
- (Wales) Joey Jones
- (England) Brian Kettle
- (England) Colin Irwin
- (England) Phil Neal
- (Scotland) Alan Hansen
- (England) Phil Thompson
- (England) Alan Kennedy

=== Midfielders ===
- (England) Ian Callaghan
- (England) Jimmy Case
- (Republic of Ireland) Steve Heighway
- (England) Sammy Lee
- (England) Ray Kennedy
- (England) Terry McDermott
- (Republic of Ireland) Kevin Sheedy
- (Scotland) Graeme Souness

=== Attackers ===
- (England) David Fairclough
- (Scotland) Kenny Dalglish
- (England) Howard Gayle
- (England) David Johnson

== Squad statistics ==
=== Appearances and goals ===
No.	Pos	Nat	Player	Total		Division 1		FA Cup		League Cup		European Cup		European Super Cup	
No.	Pos	Nat	Player	Apps	Goals	Apps	Goals	Apps	Goals	Apps	Goals	Apps	Goals	Apps	Goals
	MF	(England) ENG	Jimmy Case	48	9	37+0	7	5+1	1	1+0	0	2+0	0	2+0	1
	GK	(England) ENG	Ray Clemence	53	0	42+0	0	7+0	0	1+0	0	2+0	0	1+0	0
	FW	(Scotland) SCO	Kenny Dalglish	54	25	42+0	21	7+0	4	1+0	0	2+0	0	2+0	0
	FW	(England) ENG	David Fairclough	10	3	3+1	2	3+0	0	0+1	0	0+1	0	1+0	1
	DF	(Scotland) SCO	Alan Hansen	42	2	34+0	1	6+0	1	0+0	0	0+0	0	2+0	0
	MF	(Republic of Ireland) IRL	Steve Heighway	37	4	26+2	4	2+3	0	1+0	0	2+0	0	0+1	0
	DF	(England) ENG	Emlyn Hughes	28	1	16+0	0	7+0	0	1+0	0	2+0	0	2+0	1
	FW	(England) ENG	David Johnson	37	18	26+4	16	4+0	2	0+1	0	0+1	0	1+0	0
	DF	(England) ENG	Alan Kennedy	43	3	37+0	3	2+0	0	1+0	0	2+0	0	1+0	0
	MF	(England) ENG	Ray Kennedy	54	11	42+0	10	7+0	1	1+0	0	2+0	0	2+0	0
	MF	(England) ENG	Sammy Lee	2	0	1+1	0	0+0	0	0+0	0	0+0	0	0+0	0
	MF	(England) ENG	Terry McDermott	49	8	34+3	8	7+0	0	1+0	0	2+0	0	2+0	0
	DF	(England) ENG	Phil Neal	54	5	42+0	5	7+0	0	1+0	0	2+0	0	2+0	0
	GK	(England) ENG	Steve Ogrizovic	1	0	0+0	0	0+0	0	0+0	0	0+0	0	1+0	0
	MF	(Scotland) SCO	Graeme Souness	53	9	41+0	8	7+0	1	1+0	0	2+0	0	2+0	0
	DF	(England) ENG	Phil Thompson	49	0	39+0	0	6+0	0	1+0	0	2+0	0	1+0	0

== League table ==
Pos	Team	Pld	W	D	L	GF	GA	GD	Pts	Qualification or relegation
1	Liverpool (C)	42	30	8	4	85	16	+69	68	Qualification for the European Cup first round (Note: Nottingham Forest qualified for the European Cup first round as the 1978–79 European Cup winners.)
2	Nottingham Forest	42	21	18	3	61	26	+35	60	Qualification for the European Cup first round
3	West Bromwich Albion	42	24	11	7	72	35	+37	59	Qualification for the UEFA Cup first round
4	Everton	42	17	17	8	52	40	+12	51	Qualification for the UEFA Cup first round
5	Leeds United	42	18	14	10	70	52	+18	50	Qualification for the UEFA Cup first round

Source: World Football
Rules for classification: 1) Points; 2) Goal difference; 3) Goals scored
(C) Champions

== Results ==
=== First Division ===
Date	Opponents	Venue	Result	Scorers	Attendance	Report 1	Report 2
19 August 1978	Queens Park Rangers	H	2–1	Dalglish 27' Heighway 76'	50,793	Report	Report
22 August 1978	Ipswich Town	A	3–0	Souness 17' Dalglish 22', 74'	28,114	Report	Report
26 August 1978	Manchester City	A	4–1	Souness 15', 48' R Kennedy 34' Dalglish 56'	46,710	Report	Report
2 September 1978	Tottenham Hotspur	H	7–0	Dalglish 8', 20' R Kennedy 28' Johnson 48', 58' Neal 64' (pen.) McDermott 76'	50,705	Report	Report
9 September 1978	Birmingham City	A	3–0	Souness 12', 57' A Kennedy 81'	31,740	Report	Report
16 September 1978	Coventry City	H	1–0	Souness 27'	51,130	Report	Report
23 September 1978	West Bromwich Albion	A	1–1	Dalglish 70'	33,834	Report	Report
30 September 1978	Bolton Wanderers	H	3–0	Case 13', 39', 55'	47,099	Report	Report
7 October 1978	Norwich City	A	4–1	Heighway 6', 10' Johnson 36' Case 49'	25,632	Report	Report
14 October 1978	Derby County	H	5–0	Johnson 29' R Kennedy 55', 78' Dalglish 61', 80'	47,475	Report	Report
21 October 1978	Chelsea	H	2–0	Johnson 6' Dalglish 71'	45,775	Report	Report
28 October 1978	Everton	A	0–1		53,131	Report	Report
4 November 1978	Leeds United	H	1–1	McDermott 81' (pen.)	51,657	Report	Report
11 November 1978	Queens Park Rangers	A	3–1	Heighway 29' R Kennedy 45' Johnson 85'	26,626	Report	Report
18 November 1978	Manchester City	H	1–0	Neal 86' (pen.)	47,765	Report	Report
22 November 1978	Tottenham Hotspur	A	0–0		50,393	Report	Report
25 November 1978	Middlesbrough	H	2–0	McDermott 30' Souness 69'	39,812	Report	Report
2 December 1978	Arsenal	A	0–1		51,902	Report	Report
9 December 1978	Nottingham Forest	H	2–0	McDermott 29' (pen.), 48'	51,469	Report	Report
16 December 1978	Bristol City	A	0–1		28,722	Report	Report
26 December 1978	Manchester United	A	3–0	R Kennedy 5' Case 25' Fairclough 67'	54,940	Report	Report
3 February 1979	West Bromwich Albion	H	2–1	Dalglish 21' Fairclough 53'	52,211	Report	Report
13 February 1979	Birmingham City	H	1–0	Souness 37'	35,207	Report	Report
21 February 1979	Norwich City	H	6–0	Dalglish 3', 48' Johnson 46', 51' A Kennedy 80' R Kennedy 90'	35,754	Report	Report
24 February 1979	Derby County	A	2–0	Dalglish 11' R Kennedy 70'	27,859	Report	Report
3 March 1979	Chelsea	A	0–0		40,594	Report	Report
6 March 1979	Coventry City	A	0–0		26,629	Report	Report
13 March 1979	Everton	H	1–1	Dalglish 15'	52,352	Report	Report
20 March 1979	Wolverhampton Wanderers	H	2–0	McDermott 34' Johnson 48'	39,695	Report	Report
24 March 1979	Ipswich Town	H	2–0	Dalglish 41' Johnson 81'	43,243	Report	Report
7 April 1979	Arsenal	H	3–0	Case 49' Dalglish 73' McDermott 88'	47,297	Report	Report
10 April 1979	Wolverhampton Wanderers	A	1–0	Hansen 33'	30,857	Report	Report
14 April 1979	Manchester United	H	2–0	Dalglish 36' Neal 46'	46,608	Report	Report
16 April 1979	Aston Villa	A	1–3	Johnson 65'	44,029	Report	Report
21 April 1979	Bristol City	H	1–0	Dalglish 5'	43,191	Report	Report
24 April 1979	Southampton	A	1–1	Johnson 12'	23,181	Report	Report
28 April 1979	Nottingham Forest	A	0–0		41,898	Report	Report
1 May 1979	Bolton Wanderers	A	4–1	Johnson 11' R Kennedy 51', 76' Dalglish 75'	35,200	Report	Report
5 May 1979	Southampton	H	2–0	Neal 16', 80'	46,687	Report	Report
8 May 1979	Aston Villa	H	3–0	A Kennedy 1' Dalglish 38' McDermott 57'	50,576	Report	Report
11 May 1979	Middlesbrough	A	1–0	Johnson 56'	32,244	Report	Report
17 May 1979	Leeds United	A	3–0	Johnson 21', 57' Case 42'	41,324	Report	Report

=== FA Cup ===
Date	Opponents	Venue	Result	Scorers	Attendance	Report 1	Report 2
10 January 1979	Southend United	A	0–0		31,033	Report	Report
17 January 1979	Southend United	H	3–0	Case 38' Dalglish 75' R Kennedy 85'	37.797	Report	Report
30 January 1979	Blackburn Rovers	H	1–0	Dalglish 82'	43,432	Report	Report
28 February 1979	Burnley	H	3–0	Johnson 43', 61' Souness 59'	47,161	Report	Report
10 March 1979	Ipswich Town	A	1–0	Dalglish 52'	31,322	Report	Report
31 March 1979	Manchester United	N	2–2	Dalglish 17' Hansen 82'	52,584	Report	Report
4 April 1979	Manchester United	N	0–1		53,069	Report	Report

=== League Cup ===
Date	Opponents	Venue	Result	Scorers	Attendance	Report 1	Report 2
28 August 1978	Sheffield United	A	0–1		35753	Report	Report

=== European Cup ===
Date	Opponents	Venue	Result	Scorers	Attendance	Report 1	Report 2
13 September 1978	Nottingham Forest	A	0–2		38,316	Report	Report
27 September 1978	Nottingham Forest	H	0–0		51,679	Report	Report

=== European Super Cup ===
Date	Opponents	Venue	Result	Scorers	Attendance	Report 1	Report 2
4 December 1978	R.S.C. Anderlecht	A	1–3	Case 27'	35,000	Report	Report
19 December 1978	R.S.C. Anderlecht	H	2–1	Hughes 13' Fairclough 85'	23,598	Report	Report
