= 1973–74 Arsenal F.C. season =

English football club season

Arsenal
1973–74 season
- Chairman: Denis Hill-Wood
- Manager: Bertie Mee
- First Division: 10th place
- FA Cup: 4th round
- League Cup: Second Round
- Top goalscorer: League: Alan Ball (13); All: Alan Ball (13), Ray Kennedy (13)
Home colours	Away colours

The 1973–74 season was Arsenal Football Club's 48th consecutive season in the Football League First Division. After a second-place finish the previous season, Arsenal slid to tenth and found no success in either the FA Cup or League Cup.

Captain Frank McLintock, after struggling with manager Bertie Mee, left the club and Bob McNab assumed the captaincy. George Graham also left the club.

The season did see Liam Brady break into the first team, partnering with Alan Ball. Ball was Arsenal's top scorer in the league.

== Season summary ==
After the previous season, Mee believed that a rebuild was necessary and let go of several key players. Captain Frank McLintock, age 34, moved to Queens Park Rangers with whom he finished a close second in the league in 1975-76. George Graham also departed, becoming Tommy Docherty's first purchase as Manchester United manager. Steve Burtenshaw, Mee's assistant, resigned just a few weeks into the season after losing the trust of the players and joined Queens Park Rangers. Brian Chambers from Sunderland was the only incoming transfer.

Arsenal began the season with 3-0 victory over Manchester United, but followed it up with two home losses and a 0-5 away loss to Sheffield United. Although Arsenal had a few decent performance including a 4-0 win over Norwich City (who had done the double over them the previous season), Arsenal continued to struggle in the league. Their cup prospects did not fare much better, as they lost to Tranmere Rovers in a second round League Cup tie and knocked out of the FA Cup in a fourth-round replay against Aston Villa.

The season had few silver linings. Liam Brady broke into the first team and benefited from playing with Alan Ball in the midfield. However, in the last match of the season which also brought Brady's first goal, Ball broke his leg in a tackle.

== Final league table ==
Pos	Team	Pld	W	D	L	GF	GA	GAv	Pts	Qualification or relegation
8	Queens Park Rangers	42	13	17	12	56	52	1.077	43	
9	Leicester City	42	13	16	13	51	41	1.244	42	
10	Arsenal	42	14	14	14	49	51	0.961	42	
11	Tottenham Hotspur	42	14	14	14	45	50	0.900	42	
12	Wolverhampton Wanderers	42	13	15	14	49	49	1.000	41	Qualification for the UEFA Cup first round (Note: Wolverhampton Wanderers qualified for the UEFA Cup as the 1973-74 Football League Cup winners.)

Source: World Football
Rules for classification: 1) Points; 2) Goal average; 3) Goals scored

== Results ==
Arsenal's score comes first

=== Legend ===
Win	Draw	Loss

=== Football League First Division ===
Date	Opponent	Venue	Result	Attendance	Scorers
25 August 1973	Manchester United	H	3–0	51,501	
28 August 1973	Leeds United	H	1–2	47,529	
1 September 1973	Newcastle United	A	1–1	30,665	
4 September 1973	Sheffield United	A	0–5	27,839	
8 September 1973	Leicester City	H	0–2	28,558	
11 September 1973	Sheffield United	H	1–0	29,434	
15 September 1973	Norwich City	A	4–0	29,378	
22 September 1973	Stoke City	H	2–1	30,968	
29 September 1973	Everton	A	0–1	31,359	
6 October 1973	Birmingham City	H	1–0	23,915	
13 October 1973	Tottenham Hotspur	A	0–2	41,855	
20 October 1973	Ipswich Town	H	1–1	28,344	
27 October 1973	Queen's Park Rangers	A	0–2	29,115	
3 November 1973	Liverpool	H	0–2	39,857	
10 November 1973	Manchester City	A	2–1	31,041	
17 November 1973	Chelsea	H	0–0	38,977	
24 November 1973	West Ham United	A	3–1	28,287	
1 December 1973	Coventry City	H	2–2	22,380	
4 December 1973	Wolverhampton Wanderers	H	2–2	13,751	
8 December 1973	Derby County	A	1–1	25,161	
15 December 1973	Burnley	A	1–2	13,200	
22 December 1973	Everton	H	1–0	19,886	
26 December 1973	Southampton	A	1–1	24,133	
29 December 1973	Leicester City	A	0–2	25,860	
1 January 1974	Newcastle United	H	0–1	29,558	
12 January 1974	Norwich City	H	2–0	22,084	
19 January 1974	Manchester United	A	1–1	38,869	
2 February 1974	Burnley	H	1–1	20,789	
5 February 1974	Leeds United	A	1–3	26,778	
16 February 1974	Tottenham Hotspur	H	0–1	38,892	
23 February 1974	Birmingham City	A	1–3	29,822	
2 March 1974	Southampton	H	1–0	19,210	
16 March 1974	Ipswich Town	A	2–2	22,297	
23 March 1974	Manchester City	H	2–0	25,319	
30 March 1974	Stoke City	A	0–0	18,532	
6 April 1974	West Ham United	H	0–0	37,868	
13 April 1974	Chelsea	A	3–1	29,152	
15 April 1974	Wolverhampton Wanderers	A	1–3	25,881	
20 April 1974	Derby County	H	2–0	26,017	
24 April 1974	Liverpool	A	1-0	47,997	
27 April 1974	Coventry City	A	3–3	19,945	
30 April 1974	Queen's Park Rangers	H	1–1	40,396	

=== FA Cup ===
Round	Date	Opponent	Venue	Result	Attendance	Goalscorers
R3	5 January 1974	Norwich City	A	1–0	21,500	
R4	26 January 1974	Aston Villa	H	1–1	41,682	
R4 R	30 January 1974	Aston Villa	A	0–2	47,821	

=== League Cup ===
Round	Date	Opponent	Venue	Result	Attendance	Goalscorers
R2	2 October 1973	Tranmere Rovers	H	0–1	20,337	

== Squad ==
Note: Flags indicate national team as defined under FIFA eligibility rules; some limited exceptions apply. Players may hold more than one non-FIFA nationality.

Pos.	Nation	Player
GK	SCO	Bob Wilson
DF	NIR	Pat Rice
DF	ENG	Bob McNab
DF	ENG	Peter Simpson
MF	ENG	Peter Storey
MF	SCO	Eddie Kelly
MF	ENG	George Armstrong
MF	ENG	Alan Ball
FW	ENG	John Radford
FW	ENG	Ray Kennedy
FW	ENG	Charlie George

Pos.	Nation	Player
DF	ENG	Jeff Blockley
DF	NIR	Sammy Nelson
MF	IRL	Liam Brady
MF	ENG	Brian Hornsby
MF	ENG	David Price
DF	ENG	Richie Powling
DF	ENG	Brendon Batson
GK	ENG	Jimmy Rimmer

== Top scorers ==
Football League

- Alan Ball - 13
- Ray Kennedy - 12
- John Radford - 7
