= Farnworth Grammar School =

Information
- School type: Grammar school
- Established: 1715
- Closed: 1982
- Gender: Boys (1715-1922); Mixed (1922-1982)

Farnworth Grammar School was a grammar school founded in 1715 at Farnworth, Lancashire.

The school was first established at Moses Gate and educated boys. It relocated to Bolton Road in 1922 and became coeducational at the same time. It closed in 1982.

== Former pupils ==
- Alan Ball, Jr. footballer
- Ian Ramsey, Anglican bishop
- Laurence Robertson MP
- Kenneth Wolstenholme, commentator
