= Wyndham Evans =

Welsh footballer and manager

Personal information
- Full name: Wyndham Edgar Evans
- Date of birth: 19 March 1951 (age 75)
- Place of birth: Llanelli, Wales
- Position: Right back

Youth career
- 1968: Llanelli Steel
- 1969–1971: Stoke City

Senior career*
Years	Team	Apps	(Gls)
1971–1983	Swansea City	352	(20)
1983	Llanelli		
1983–1985	Swansea City	37	(0)
1985	Pembroke Borough		
Total		389	(20)

Managerial career
- 1983: Llanelli
- 1985: Pembroke Borough
- Llanelli
- 1996: Carmarthen Town
- * Club domestic league appearances and goals

Wyndham Edgar Evans (born 19 March 1951) is a Welsh football commentator and former player and manager.

== Playing career ==
Born in Llanelli, Evans played as a right back. After playing as an amateur with Stoke City, Evans turned professional with Swansea City in February 1971, making 389 appearances in the Football League for them over two spells. While at Swansea, Evans competed in all four divisions of the Football League.

== Management career ==
Evans had spells as player-manager of both Llanelli and Pembroke Borough, before returning to manage Llanelli.

== Media career ==
Evans later became a commentator for Swansea City's TV service.

== Personal life ==
His nephew is Stuart Roberts, who also played for Swansea.

== Career statistics ==
Appearances and goals by club, season and competition
Club	Season	League			FA Cup		League Cup		Other		Total	
Club	Season	Division	Apps	Goals	Apps	Goals	Apps	Goals	Apps	Goals	Apps	Goals
Swansea City	1970–71	Third Division	3	0	0	0	0	0	0	0	3	0
Swansea City	1971–72	Third Division	25	0	2	0	1	0	0	0	28	0
Swansea City	1972–73	Third Division	38	5	1	0	0	0	0	0	39	5
Swansea City	1973–74	Fourth Division	39	2	1	0	2	0	0	0	42	2
Swansea City	1974–75	Fourth Division	42	7	1	1	1	0	0	0	44	8
Swansea City	1975–76	Fourth Division	45	3	1	0	2	0	0	0	48	3
Swansea City	1976–77	Fourth Division	43	0	1	0	4	0	0	0	48	0
Swansea City	1977–78	Fourth Division	46	3	4	0	2	0	0	0	52	3
Swansea City	1978–79	Third Division	35	0	3	0	5	0	0	0	43	0
Swansea City	1979–80	Second Division	16	0	0	0	0	0	0	0	16	0
Swansea City	1980–81	Second Division	13	0	0	0	0	0	0	0	13	0
Swansea City	1981–82	First Division	1	0	0	0	0	0	2	0	3	0
Swansea City	1982–83	First Division	6	0	0	0	0	0	1	0	7	0
Swansea City	1983–84	Second Division	17	0	0	0	0	0	0	0	17	0
Swansea City	1984–85	Third Division	20	0	1	0	2	0	0	0	23	0
Career total			389	20	15	1	19	0	3	0	426	21
