= Gary Stanley =

English footballer

Personal information
- Date of birth: 4 March 1954 (age 72)
- Place of birth: Burton upon Trent, England
- Position: Midfielder

Youth career
- 19xx–1971: Chelsea

Senior career*
Years	Team	Apps	(Gls)
1971–1979	Chelsea	109	(15)
1979	Fort Lauderdale Strikers	20	(0)
1979–1981	Everton	52	(1)
1981–1984	Swansea City	72	(4)
1984–1986	Portsmouth	47	(1)
1986–1988	Wichita Wings (indoor)	51	(2)
1988–1989	Bristol City	10	(0)
1989-1990	Welton Rovers		
1990-1991	Waterlooville		
- * Club domestic league appearances and goals

Gary Stanley (born 4 March 1954) is an English former professional footballer who played as a midfielder in the Football League for Chelsea, Everton, Swansea City, Portsmouth and Bristol City. He also played in the North American Soccer League with Fort Lauderdale Strikers and in the Major Indoor Soccer League with Wichita Wings.

== Career ==
Stanley started his career with Chelsea, where he turned professional in 1971 and made his league debut at the age of 21, on 16 August 1975 in a 2–1 defeat away to Sunderland in the Second Division. He helped the club to promotion to the First Division in the 1976–77 season, and remained with Chelsea until their relegation in 1979, when, after a summer in the NASL with Fort Lauderdale Strikers, he joined Everton for a fee of £300,000. He failed to show his Chelsea form with Everton, and moved on to Swansea City two years later for £150,000. Stanley won the Welsh Cup twice with Swansea, in 1982 and 1983, before spending two years with Portsmouth and three seasons in the MISL with the Wichita Wings. He returned to England in 1988 and spent a season with Bristol City before moving into non-league football with Waterlooville. After retiring as a player he worked for NTI Communications.
