= Kramfors-Alliansen Fotboll =

Swedish football club

- Full name: Kramfors-Alliansen Fotboll
- Founded: 1904
- Ground: Kramfors IP, Kramfors
- Coach: Daniel Sundell
- League: Division 3 Mellersta Norrland
- 2024: Division 3 Mellersta Norrland, 8th of 12

Kramfors-Alliansen Fotboll is a Swedish football club located in Kramfors.

== Background ==
Kramfors-Alliansen Fotboll currently plays in Division 3 Mellersta Norrland which is the fifth tier of Swedish football. They play their home matches at the Kramfors IP in Kramfors.

The club is affiliated to Ångermanlands Fotbollförbund.
