= Geoff Barnett =

Geoff or Jeff Barnett may refer to:

- Geoff Barnett (footballer) (1946–2021), English football player
- Geoff Barnett (cricketer) (born 1984), Canadian cricketer
