= Dudley Lewis =

Welsh footballer (1962–2025)

Personal information
- Full name: Dudley Keith Lewis
- Date of birth: 17 November 1962
- Place of birth: Swansea, Wales
- Date of death: 22 June 2025 (aged 62)
- Height: 5 ft 10 in (1.78 m)
- Position: Defender

Senior career*
Years	Team	Apps	(Gls)
1980–1989	Swansea City	300	(2)
1989–1991	Huddersfield Town	34	(0)
1991	→ Halifax Town (loan)	11	(0)
1991–1992	Wrexham	9	(0)
1992	Halifax Town	13	(0)
1993	Torquay United	9	(0)
1994–1995	Inter Cardiff	27	(0)
1996	Llanelli		
1996–1997	Carmarthen Town	12	(0)

International career
1983	Wales	1	(0)

Managerial career
- 1996: Llanelli (player/manager)
- * Club domestic league appearances and goals

Dudley Keith Lewis (17 November 1962 – 22 June 2025) was a Welsh professional footballer who played as a defender, spending most of his career at his hometown club, Swansea City. Lewis captained the Swansea schoolboys before skippering his country as a youth. Having signed apprenticeship forms at the Vetch Field, he captained the Welsh youth squad at the European Youth Championships in Germany in 1981. Lewis gained his one and only cap for Wales vs Brazil in 1983 where he exchanged shirts with Sócrates.

== Career ==
A Welsh schoolboy international, Lewis began his career as an apprentice at his home town club Swansea City, making his professional debut in a 2–1 defeat to Notts County. After establishing himself in the side, Lewis helped the club to three Welsh Cup victories and promotion to First Division football.

Lewis was involved in the famous game against Preston North End in 1981 that earned the Swans promotion to the top flight. When the Swans won promotion to the First Division in 1981 after that historic victory at Preston North End, manager John Toshack ran onto the pitch at the final whistle to hug one player. That player was Dudley Lewis. It was a show of appreciation from the manager to the youngster, who, in the final push for promotion, had displayed composure and maturity beyond his tender years.

Lewis was a Pentrehafod schoolboy, who, even at that level was assured on the ball, captaining the Swansea schoolboys before skippering his country as a youth. Having signed apprenticeship forms at the Vetch Field, he captained the Welsh youth squad at the European Youth Championships in Germany in 1981.

Lewis' star continued to rise, and he was handed his first-team debut for the Swans in February 1981 in an away fixture at Notts County before earning the first of his nine U21 Wales caps in a 2–1 victory over France at Somerton Park in October that year. But it was later on in the 1980–81 season that would define the composed defender's time with the Swans. With John Toshack's side slipping back in their chase for promotion to the top flight, Toshack chose to bring Dudley back into the team for the visit of Bolton Wanderers. And after an assured display in his role as sweeper, helping the Swans to a clean sheet and a 3–0 victory, Dudley kept his place in the side for the rest of the season.

After winning promotion and his first Welsh Cup winners medal at the end of the historic 1980-81 campaign, he featured in Swansea's inaugural season in the top flight, playing in the final game of the season against European Cup winners Aston Villa.

Recognition of Lewis' consistent displays came with his one and only full Welsh International cap against Brazil at Ninian Park in June 1983 – a game that saw Wales draw 1–1 with the South American giants. At the end of the game, Lewis swapped shirts with Brazilian legend Socrates.

== Death ==
Lewis died on 22 June 2025, at the age of 62.
