= Alan Ball Jr. =

English footballer (1945–2007)

Alan Ball MBE
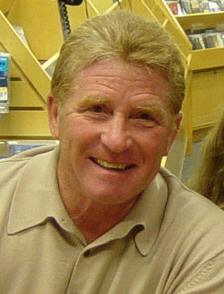
- Ball in 2004

Personal information
- Full name: Alan James Ball
- Date of birth: 12 May 1945
- Place of birth: Farnworth, Lancashire, England
- Date of death: 25 April 2007 (aged 61)
- Place of death: Warsash, Hampshire, England
- Height: 5 ft 6 in (1.68 m)
- Position: Midfielder

Youth career
- 1960–1961: Bolton Wanderers
- 1961–1962: Blackpool

Senior career*
| Years | Team | Apps | (Gls) |
| 1960–1961 | Ashton United | 7 | (1) |
| 1962–1966 | Blackpool | 116 | (40) |
| 1966–1971 | Everton | 208 | (66) |
| 1971–1976 | Arsenal | 177 | (45) |
| 1976 | → Hellenic (loan) | 4 | |
| 1976–1979 | Southampton | 132 | (9) |
| 1978 | → Philadelphia Fury (loan) | 33 | (5) |
| 1979 | Vancouver Whitecaps | 31 | (10) |
| 1980–1981 | Blackpool | 30 | (5) |
| 1981–1982 | Southampton | 63 | (2) |
| 1982 | → Floreat Athena (loan) | 3 | (2) |
| 1982–1983 | Eastern | 12 | |
| 1983 | Bristol Rovers | 17 | (2) |
| Total | | 833 | (187+) |

International career
| 1965–1975 | England | 72 | (8) |

Managerial career
- 1978: Philadelphia Fury
- 1980–1981: Blackpool
- 1984–1989: Portsmouth
- 1989–1991: Stoke City
- 1991–1994: Exeter City
- 1994–1995: Southampton
- 1995–1996: Manchester City
- 1998–1999: Portsmouth
Medal record
Men's football
Representing England
FIFA World Cup
| Winner | 1966 England |
- * Club domestic league appearances and goals

Alan James Ball (12 May 1945 – 25 April 2007) was an English professional football player and manager. He won the 1966 World Cup with England and scored more than 180 league goals in a career spanning 22 years. After retiring as a player, he had a 15-year career as a manager which included spells in the top flight of English football with Portsmouth, Southampton and Manchester City. He was inducted in the English Football Hall of Fame in 2003. He is also one of the few footballers with over 1,050 competitive appearances.

Following a brief non–league spell at Ashton United, Ball started his professional career at Blackpool at the age of 17 in 1962, becoming the club's star player and ensuring Blackpool's First Division status. He signed for Everton in 1966, winning the First Division in 1970 and the Charity Shield the same year. After five and a half years and over 250 appearances for the club, he signed with Double winners Arsenal in December 1971 for a record fee of £220,000 before being sold to Second Division side Southampton in December 1976. Whilst with Southampton, he captained the side to promotion in 1978 and the 1979 League Cup final. He spent time on loan managing Philadelphia Fury in the NASL and was transferred to the Vancouver Whitecaps for two seasons, before returning to Blackpool as player–manager and then Southampton for two years as a First Division outfit. Brief spells at Floreat Athena, Eastern and Bristol Rovers concluded his career in 1983.

Ball played 72 games and scored 8 goals for England between 1965 and 1975. First called up at age 19, he established himself in the national team, becoming a starter at the 1966 FIFA World Cup. England won the competition, with Ball playing in the final and being the team's youngest member at 21 years of age. He also was starter for England at UEFA Euro 1968 and the 1970 FIFA World Cup. Ball briefly captained England in 1975 before retiring from international football the same year. He died in April 2007, aged 61.

== Club career ==
=== Birth and early career at Blackpool ===
Ball was born in Farnworth, Lancashire, the son of (James) Alan Ball, a former professional football player and manager and later a publican, and his wife, Violet, née Duckworth. Ball started his footballing career whilst still a schoolboy, playing for Ashton United, the team his father managed, amongst the hurly burly of the Lancashire Combination. He fell out with his headmaster over missing games for his Farnworth Grammar School team due to him training/trialling at Wolverhampton Wanderers. He left Farnworth Grammar with no qualifications.

After he left school, Wolves decided not to take Ball on. The midfielder then started training with Bolton Wanderers but they too decided not to give him a professional deal, as manager Bill Ridding said he was too small.

Blackpool signed him after Ball's father called in a favour with the coach, an old friend with whom he used to play. Ball was given a trial in September 1961 and was immediately signed up as an apprentice. He turned professional in May 1962, making his Football League debut on 18 August 1962 against Liverpool at Anfield in a 2–1 victory. At age 17 years and 98 days, he became Blackpool's youngest League debutant. On 21 November 1964, Ball scored his first hat-trick as a professional, in a 3–3 draw with Fulham at Craven Cottage.

=== Everton ===
Ball's performances in the 1966 World Cup winning England team attracted the attention of a number of clubs bigger than Blackpool. He was eventually sold to Everton for a fee of £112,000 in August 1966, at the time a record transfer fee paid to an English club. At Everton, Ball settled into what became regarded as his generation's best Everton midfield trio, alongside Colin Harvey and Howard Kendall (they are still affectionately referred to as "The Holy Trinity"). Everton reached the 1968 FA Cup Final, but lost to West Bromwich Albion and were knocked out by Manchester City in the semi-finals the following year. Ball was as instrumental a player in the team as ever, as Everton took the 1970 Football League Championship title, seeing off a late challenge from Leeds United.

Back at club level, Everton again capitulated in the semi-finals of the FA Cup in 1971, with Ball's opening goal overhauled by two strikes from Merseyside rivals Liverpool, who went on to lose the final to "double"-chasing Arsenal. Ball played 259 times for the Toffees, in all scoring 79 goals.

=== Arsenal ===
On 22 December 1971, Arsenal paid a record fee of £220,000 to take Ball to Highbury. He was 26 years of age and at his peak for both form and fitness when he joined Arsenal; he made his debut against Nottingham Forest on 27 December 1971. However, Arsenal could not defend their League title in 1971–72 and also lost their grasp on the FA Cup when Leeds United beat them 1–0 in the centenary final at Wembley.

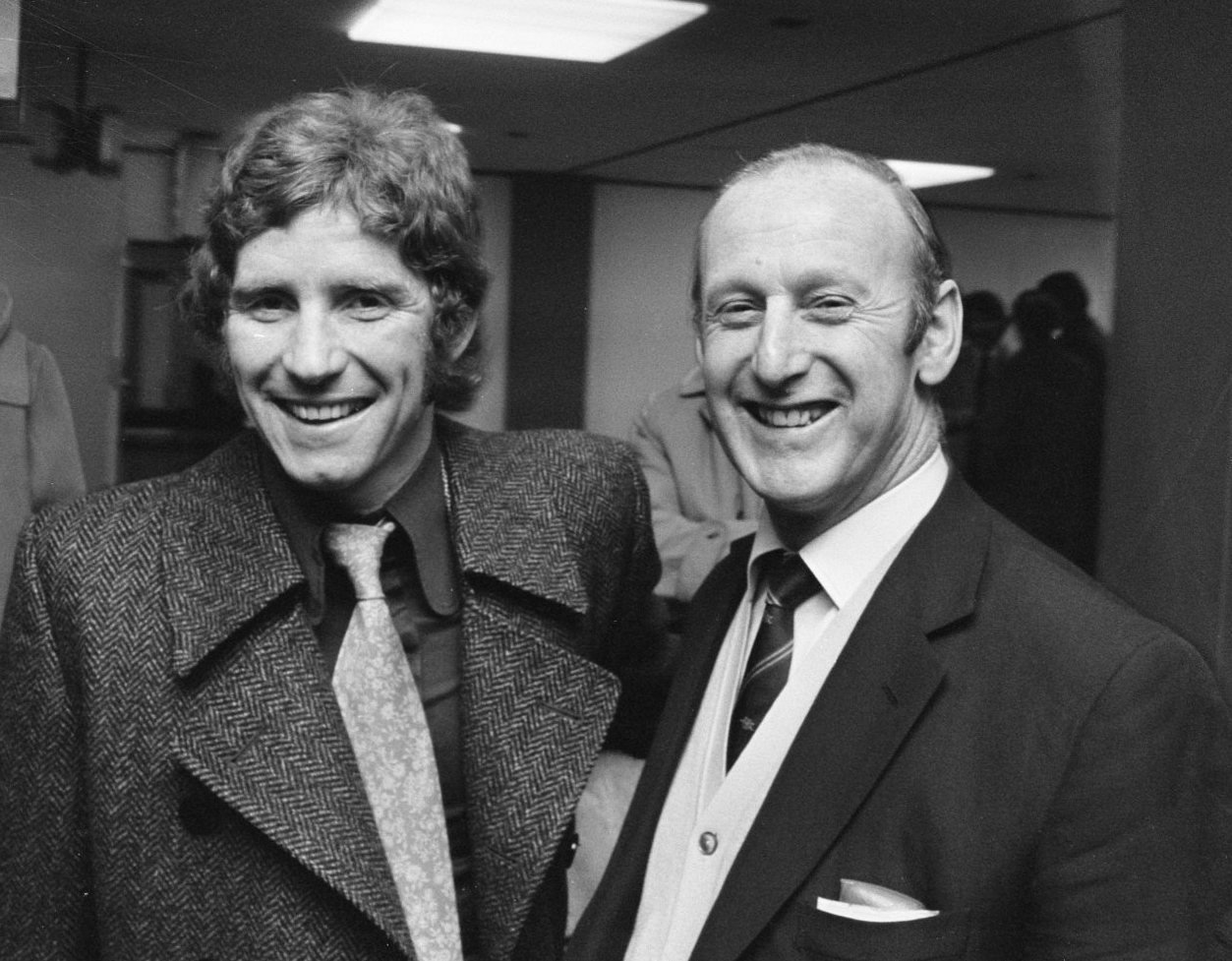
Ball and manager Bertie Mee in March 1972

Ball had continued to play for Arsenal through all this time, as a near-constant member of the first team at first, including 50 appearances in 1972–73. However, Arsenal's Double-winning side was soon dismantled and their replacements proved inadequate; Ball remained one of the few quality players in the Arsenal side, and he was made club captain in 1974. In April 1974 Ball broke his leg, resulting in his missing the start of the 1974–75 season, in which Arsenal finished 16th. Ball also missed the start of the 1975–76 season after an injury in the pre-season friendly at Crewe Alexandra, Arsenal subsequently finished in 17th place that season. Bertie Mee resigned as Arsenal manager in the summer of 1976 and it was clear new manager Terry Neill wanted to take the club in a new direction. Now aged 31, Ball continued to play for Arsenal until December 1976, when he was sold to Southampton for a fee of £60,000. In total he made 217 appearances for the Gunners, scoring 52 goals.

=== Southampton ===
Ball's move to Southampton was symmetrical in that he had arrived at clubs, namely Everton, Arsenal and Southampton in 1966, 1971 and 1976, when each were holders of the FA Cup. He helped Southampton earn promotion back to the First Division in 1978 and picked up a League Cup runners-up medal in 1979 after they were beaten 3–2 by Nottingham Forest.

=== Move to North America ===
Ball then went to play in the decade-old North American Soccer League, joining the Philadelphia Fury as a player in May 1978. He was named player-coach after former Newcastle United coach Richard Dinnis was fired in June. One season later, after he was no longer coaching, he was sold to the Vancouver Whitecaps in June 1979. Almost instantly he made a huge impact with the Whitecaps and helped lead them to the NASL Soccer Bowl title that September. He also walked away with the 1979 Playoff MVP award, scoring seven goals in nine games.

=== Return to Blackpool ===
He returned to Britain in February 1980 as player-manager of his first professional club, Blackpool, after honouring the remainder of his contract with Vancouver. Blackpool's general manager Freddie Scott substituted in the meantime. Ball's appointment was well received by the Blackpool supporters, and he returned with enthusiasm, a desire to bring back the good times to the club, and still had enough energy to take the field occasionally.

The year that followed saw Blackpool's recent ill-fortune slump even further. The club slid towards relegation, and only some determined performances (including four wins out of their final six games) ensured an 18th-placed finish and survival. During the close season, Ball brought in several new faces and was also prepared to gamble on youngsters. One of his most unpopular moves amongst the fans was the sale of Tony Kellow, a huge favourite at Bloomfield Road. The 1980–81 season began in similar fashion, with Blackpool struggling near the foot of the table. The optimism that had been in place during pre-season turned to anger as the team's performances failed to match up to Ball's promises.

After an FA Cup first-round win over Fylde neighbours Fleetwood Town on 22 November, Ball publicly criticised the fans for allegedly not wanting the team to succeed as much as he did. Eventually it all became too much for manager and club, and shortly after a defeat at Brentford on 28 February 1981, Ball's contract was terminated with immediate effect and the mutual love affair had ended in ruins. Blackpool were relegated at the end of the season. In March 2005, Ball finally commented on his time as Blackpool manager. He said, "Jack Charlton, a good friend, had offered me a coaching role at Sheffield Wednesday, and with hindsight I should have done that instead: got a bit of experience under my belt. Another thing I should have done was kept Stan Ternent on. I replaced him as manager, but he was very good. I think I was a bit big-headed, a little headstrong, and I thought being a player-manager would be no problem for me. It was a lot more difficult than I thought, and not helped by dealing with the boardroom."

=== Back at Southampton and end of playing career ===
In March 1981, Ball was tempted back to Southampton to play alongside fellow veterans and former England teammates Mick Channon and Kevin Keegan. He left Southampton in October 1982 to play for Hong Kong side Eastern, before joining Bristol Rovers in January 1983, where he remained until his retirement the following season. When Ball finally retired from playing, he had played 975 competitive games in 21 years.

== International career ==
=== 1966 World Cup ===
Despite being in a struggling Blackpool team, Ball's industry, stamina and distribution were noticed by England manager Alf Ramsey, who gave him his international debut on 9 May 1965 in a 1–1 draw with Yugoslavia in Belgrade, three days before his twentieth birthday. Ramsey was preparing for the World Cup a year later, which England was to host, and was developing a system whereby England could deploy midfielders with a defensive and industrious bent, something which was not wholly guaranteed from conventional wide men. As a result, Ball became a useful tool for Ramsey to use – able to play conventionally wide or in the centre but still in possession of the energy to help out his defence when required.

Ball was the youngest member of the squad of 22 selected by Ramsey for the tournament, aged only 21. Though England as a team emerged collectively heroic from the tournament, Ball was one of many players regarded as an individual success, especially as he was one of the more inexperienced charges with no proven record at the very highest level. Indeed, he, Geoff Hurst and Martin Peters emerged with enormous credit and eternal acclaim from the competition – and all of them were still only in single figures for caps won by the time they were named in the team for the final against West Germany.

In front of a crowd of 98,000 at Wembley Stadium, Ball played what is considered to be one of his better games, with an assist to a controversial goal in the 101st minute of the game scored by Geoff Hurst, and also putting in the corner that caused the 77th minute goal for England as well.

Ball returned to a civic reception in Walkden, Lancashire following the World Cup success, where he lived with his parents and sister. Ball's appearance in the final marked the last occasion on which a Blackpool player received a full England cap.

=== 1970 World Cup ===
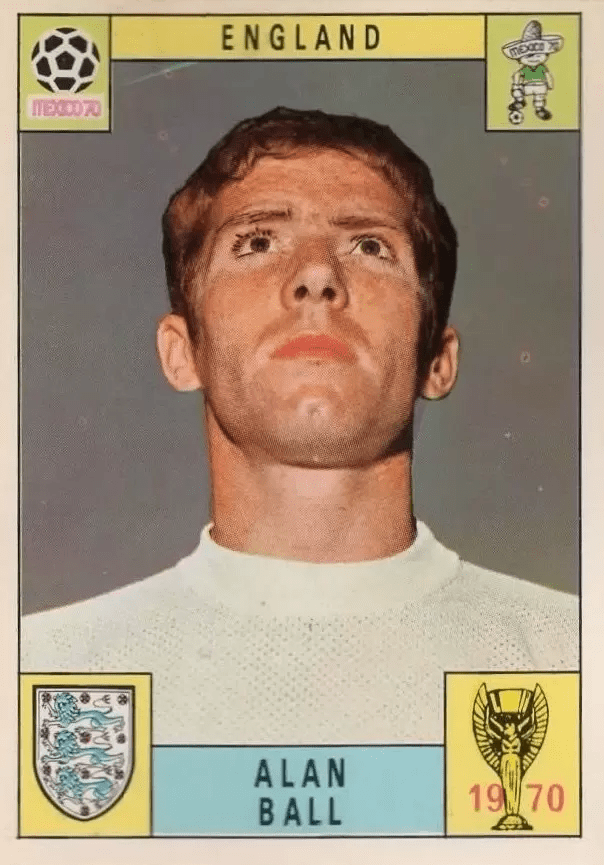
Ball's trading card from the Mexico 70 series issued by Panini.

By now, Ball was one of the first names on Ramsey's England teamsheet and he was in the squad which travelled as defending champions to the altitude of Mexico for the 1970 World Cup. Ball famously hit the crossbar with a shot as England lost one of their group games 1–0 to Brazil. England won their other group games and progressed to another showdown with West Germany in the quarter finals, but the heat sapped Ball's natural industry. England lost a 2–0 lead and their reign as world champions ended with a 3–2 loss.

=== 1974 World Cup ===
In a qualifier for the 1974 World Cup against Poland in Chorzów on 6 June 1973, Ball became the second England player to be sent off in a full international, after grabbing Lesław Ćmikiewicz by the throat and kneeing him in the groin during a player scuffle. As a result, he missed the return game at Wembley Stadium, which became one of the most notorious in English football history, ending in a 1–1 draw. England failed to qualify for the World Cup as a result of not winning.

=== Captaincy and retirement ===
Ramsey was sacked and Joe Mercer took over at a caretaker level, for whom Ball never appeared due to injury. However, Ball's relationship with his national side was enhanced and then soured beyond repair when Don Revie was appointed as Ramsey's permanent replacement. Ball was given the captaincy after the dropping of Emlyn Hughes and held it for six consecutive games, none of which England lost. They included a 2–0 victory over reigning World champions, West Germany in March 1975 and a 5–1 defeat of Scotland in May 1975.

After sustaining an injury in a pre-season friendly for Arsenal at Crewe Alexandra, Ball was not called up at all for England, let alone retained as captain, when Revie announced his squad for a game against Switzerland. Ball only found out when his wife took a call from a journalist asking for her reaction. Aged 30, Ball's international career had ended suddenly and acrimoniously after 72 appearances and eight goals. He was, however, the last of the 1966 World Cup winning team to leave the international stage (although not the last in the squad, as Ian Callaghan was unexpectedly called up by Ron Greenwood in 1977).

== Style of play ==
Considered one of the greatest players to have played for Everton, Ball was a complete and combative midfielder with good technique who possessed high levels of stamina, accurate passing abilities, and was capable of providing scoring chances for his teammates as well as scoring some spectacular goals himself. Primarily an attacking box-to-box midfielder who drove forward towards the opponents' goal, Ball would also help out the defenders of his team when they were in a pinch. Ken Rogers noted that Ball's fiery mentality was the key to his success as a footballer. Ball also stood out for being a motivator, with Johnny Morrissey noting that whenever Ball played one-twos with any of his teammates, they would be motivated to play.

== Coaching and managerial career ==
=== Portsmouth ===
Ball resumed his managerial career in May 1984 with Portsmouth and was a huge success. They just missed out on promotion to the First Division in his first two seasons as manager, and he finally guided them to the top flight in 1987. However, they were relegated after just one season back among the elite, and Ball was sacked in January 1989 for failing to mount a serious promotion challenge and because of a serious personality clash with Portsmouth's then chairman Jim Gregory.

=== Stoke City ===
The following month he joined Colchester United as assistant to Jock Wallace and in October 1989 took up a similar post under Mick Mills at Stoke City. However, Mills was sacked two weeks later and Ball was promoted to the manager's seat. He came to the conclusion that the squad he had inherited was simply not good enough and out went Chris Kamara, Dave Bamber, Leigh Palin, Carl Saunders, Gary Hackett and Nicky Morgan. Into the side came Tony Ellis, Lee Sandford, Tony Kelly, Dave Kevan, Paul Barnes and Noel Blake. It was a big gamble by Ball to change so much of the squad so quickly, and it did not pay off. Stoke stayed rooted to the bottom of the table and was relegated to the Third Division for the first time in 63 years.

Ball's next objective was to gain an instant return to the Second Division, which looked an achievable goal as after 12 matches in 1990–91 they were one of the favourites for promotion. But Stoke's form fell off and with some embarrassing results the side dropped down the table, until after a 4–0 defeat away at Wigan Athletic Ball was sacked. Stoke went on to finish 14th, their lowest league position.

=== Exeter City and England ===
In July 1991 he was appointed as manager of Third Division Exeter City. Although Exeter struggled (their form hardly helped by a tight budget), Ball managed to keep them in the Third Division (the new Division Two from the creation of the Premier League in 1992) in 1993, though by the time he moved on they were on their way to relegation to the bottom tier. Between February and August 1992 he also worked as a coach for the England team under Graham Taylor, including the 1992 European Championships, which were not a success for England, as they failed to progress beyond the group stages of the tournament in Sweden.

=== Southampton ===
In January 1994, Ball left Exeter to take over the reins at Southampton, replacing the unpopular Ian Branfoot. At the time of his appointment, Southampton seemed doomed to relegation, having spent virtually the whole season to that point in the drop zone. Ball's first task as manager was to re-establish Matthew Le Tissier's role in the team and to ensure that the other players recognised that he was the club's greatest asset. Le Tissier responded by scoring six goals in Ball's first four games in charge, including a hat-trick on 14 February 1994 in a 4–2 victory over Liverpool. In the second half of the 1993–94 season, Le Tissier played 16 games under Ball's management, scoring 15 times.

After three defeats over the Easter period, the Saints remained in the relegation zone. In the final six games Saints scored 15 goals (eight from Le Tissier) and gained 10 points which were sufficient to confirm safety on the final day of the season.

At the start of the following season, 1994–95, Ball signed goalkeeper Bruce Grobbelaar but more significantly signed Le Tissier on a new three-year deal. Despite not winning any of their first four games (including a 5–1 defeat at Newcastle), the Saints, assisted by three goals from loanee signing Ronnie Ekelund, then won four out of five games in September lifting them to seventh in the table. After this, they drifted away and only won two more games until mid-March, dropping into the relegation zone. On 22 March 1995, the Saints were at home to Newcastle and were trailing 1–0 with four minutes left; however, the team scored three goals, including two in injury time, to snatch an amazing and priceless victory.

This result inspired the Saints, who won five of their remaining 10 games and finished the season in 10th place.

=== Manchester City ===
Despite this success, Ball was tempted away in July 1995 to become Manchester City's manager under the ownership of former England teammate Francis Lee. His departure from The Dell was rather acrimonious and for some years afterwards, Ball's return visits to the Dell were greeted by abuse from some sections of the Saints' fans.

Ball's tenure at Maine Road was controversial, in that many observers and supporters felt he was appointed for his name and friendship with the chairman rather than for any credentials as a coach (and they argued that previous manager Brian Horton, appointed by Lee's predecessor Peter Swales, had done no wrong). This is debatable, as City had finished 16th and 17th under Horton, after finishing fifth, fifth and then ninth under Horton's predecessor Peter Reid.

Ball gave Paul Walsh, who had scored 15 league and cup goals for City in 1994–95, and cash, to Portsmouth in exchange for Gerry Creaney, who scored four goals for City in 1995–96. But a terrible start to the 1995–96 season saw City endure eight defeats and not win one of their opening 11 games. November saw a turnaround in fortunes when City finally managed to win a league game at the 12th attempt and follow this up with a draw and two wins which saw them end the month outside the relegation zone and Ball chosen Premier League Manager of the Month for November 1995.

City's form declined after that, and the team drew 2–2 with Liverpool on the final day of the season. The other relegation-threatened teams fared better, and City were relegated on goal difference, after seven successive seasons of top-flight football. The board kept faith with Ball, but he resigned three games into the next season's Division One campaign. He felt that he had been forced to sell their best players due to City's financial plight.

=== Back to Portsmouth ===
In January 1998, Ball was contacted by Brian Howe, who informed him he was to make a takeover bid for the club and that he would like Ball to manage the club. This led to Ball returning to Portsmouth as manager in February 1998, however the take-over never came about. When he was appointed Pompey were several points adrift at the bottom of the table and enduring a near-fatal financial crisis, going into administration for over a year. In 1998, he masterminded a miraculous escape that saw two of his former sides (Stoke City and Manchester City) relegated after Pompey won 3–1 at Bradford City on the final day of the season. He also kept them up in the 1998–99 season, but his contract was terminated on 9 December 1999 with the club in the lower half of Division One, having amassed 20 points in 21 games. His departure came six months after the club was rescued from financial oblivion by new owner Milan Mandaric. On his retirement, 54-year-old Ball was the last remaining England World Cup winner in management.

== Personal life ==
Ball was educated at Farnworth Grammar School. Ball's father Alan Sr., also a professional footballer and manager, died in a car crash in Cyprus in January 1982. In April 2021, Ball's son, Jimmy, became the third generation of the family to manage in the Football League after being appointed interim manager at Forest Green Rovers.

Ball was always a distinctive figure thanks to his diminutive stature, red hair, and his high-pitched voice. He wrote an autobiography, "Ball of Fire" in 1967, updated as It's All About a Ball, in 1978. His third autobiography, Playing Extra Time (2004) received critical acclaim giving insight into his highs and lows in the footballing world.

In April 2004, Ball appeared for Testwood Baptist Church in the Roger Frapwell Testimonial Match at the BAT ground, Totton, near Southampton, wearing the number 7 shirt as he did in the 1966 World Cup triumph. Also in that team were former Saints manager Dave Merrington and ex-Saints defender Francis Benali. The proceeds from the game were donated to local charity SCRATCH.

As a family man, Ball struggled privately after his wife and later his youngest daughter were both diagnosed with major illnesses. Lesley, whom he married on 21 May 1967 at the parish church of St Stephen, Kearsley, Lancashire, died on 16 May 2004, aged 57, after a three-year battle against ovarian cancer. Alan and Lesley, who had been together for five years prior to their marriage, had three children together: Mandy, Keely and Jimmy. They also had three grandchildren.

He had remained in the family home in Warsash, and from mid-2005, Ball was in a relationship with childhood friend Valerie Beech, ex-wife of former Bolton player Harry Beech. In May 2005, Ball put his World Cup winner's medal and commemorative tournament cap up for auction to raise money for his family, saying "They are just trinkets that take up space, I don't think I've even looked at them for years. My memories of the World Cup are more important than those things to me, and my family are even more important." The items were sold for £140,000.

Ball is the great-uncle of professional footballers John McAtee and James McAtee.

== Death ==
Ball, aged 61, died in the early hours of 25 April 2007 at his home in Hook, Fareham, Hampshire, after suffering a heart attack while attempting to put out a blaze in his garden that had started when a bonfire – on which he had been burning garden waste – re-ignited and spread to a nearby fence. His funeral was held in Winchester Cathedral on 3 May 2007. Many of Ball's former football colleagues were in attendance, and the flat cap that he had become well known for wearing was placed on top of his coffin.

The Alan Ball Memorial Cup, a charity match between two squads of former international players, in the shape of "England vs the World", was played on 29 July 2007, with proceeds going towards the Bobby Moore Fund for Cancer Research and the Warwickshire and Northamptonshire Air Ambulance Service.

== Career statistics ==
=== Club ===
Appearances and goals by club, season and competition
| Club | Season | League | | | FA Cup | | League Cup | | Europe | | Other | | Total | |
| Club | Season | Division | Apps | Goals | Apps | Goals | Apps | Goals | Apps | Goals | Apps | Goals | Apps | Goals |
|---|---|---|---|---|---|---|---|---|---|---|---|---|---|---|
| Ashton United | 1960–61 | Lancashire Combination | 7 | 1 | 0 | 0 | 0 | 0 | 0 | 0 | 0 | 0 | 7 | 1 |
| Blackpool | 1962–63 | First Division | 5 | 0 | 0 | 0 | 0 | 0 | 0 | 0 | 0 | 0 | 5 | 0 |
| Blackpool | 1963–64 | First Division | 31 | 13 | 2 | 0 | 1 | 1 | 0 | 0 | 0 | 0 | 34 | 14 |
| Blackpool | 1964–65 | First Division | 39 | 11 | 1 | 1 | 2 | 1 | 0 | 0 | 0 | 0 | 42 | 13 |
| Blackpool | 1965–66 | First Division | 41 | 16 | 2 | 0 | 2 | 1 | 0 | 0 | 0 | 0 | 45 | 17 |
| Blackpool | Total | | 116 | 40 | 5 | 1 | 5 | 3 | 0 | 0 | 0 | 0 | 126 | 44 |
| Everton | 1966–67 | First Division | 41 | 15 | 6 | 2 | 0 | 0 | 4 | 1 | 0 | 0 | 51 | 18 |
| Everton | 1967–68 | First Division | 34 | 20 | 4 | 0 | 2 | 0 | 0 | 0 | 0 | 0 | 40 | 20 |
| Everton | 1968–69 | First Division | 40 | 16 | 5 | 0 | 4 | 2 | 0 | 0 | 0 | 0 | 49 | 18 |
| Everton | 1969–70 | First Division | 37 | 10 | 1 | 1 | 3 | 1 | 0 | 0 | 0 | 0 | 41 | 12 |
| Everton | 1970–71 | First Division | 39 | 2 | 6 | 3 | 3 | 1 | 6 | 3 | 1 (Note: Appearance in FA Charity Shield) | 0 | 55 | 9 |
| Everton | 1971–72 | First Division | 17 | 3 | 0 | 0 | 1 | 0 | 0 | 0 | 0 | 0 | 18 | 3 |
| Everton | Total | | 208 | 66 | 22 | 6 | 13 | 4 | 10 | 4 | 1 | 0 | 254 | 80 |
| Arsenal | 1971–72 | First Division | 18 | 3 | 9 | 2 | 0 | 0 | 0 | 0 | 0 | 0 | 27 | 5 |
| Arsenal | 1972–73 | First Division | 40 | 10 | 8 | 4 | 3 | 0 | 0 | 0 | 0 | 0 | 51 | 14 |
| Arsenal | 1973–74 | First Division | 36 | 13 | 3 | 0 | 1 | 0 | 0 | 0 | 0 | 0 | 40 | 13 |
| Arsenal | 1974–75 | First Division | 30 | 9 | 8 | 1 | 0 | 0 | 0 | 0 | 0 | 0 | 38 | 10 |
| Arsenal | 1975–76 | First Division | 39 | 9 | 1 | 0 | 2 | 0 | 0 | 0 | 0 | 0 | 42 | 9 |
| Arsenal | 1976–77 | First Division | 14 | 1 | 0 | 0 | 6 | 0 | 0 | 0 | 0 | 0 | 20 | 1 |
| Arsenal | Total | | 177 | 45 | 29 | 7 | 12 | 0 | 0 | 0 | 0 | 0 | 218 | 52 |
| Hellenic (loan) | 1976 | National Football League (South Africa) | 4 | 0 | 0 | 0 | 0 | 0 | 0 | 0 | 0 | 0 | 4 | 0 |
| Southampton | 1976–77 | Second Division | 23 | 1 | 6 | 1 | 0 | 0 | 0 | 0 | 0 | 0 | 29 | 2 |
| Southampton | 1977–78 | Second Division | 41 | 5 | 4 | 0 | 3 | 0 | 0 | 0 | 0 | 0 | 48 | 5 |
| Southampton | 1978–79 | First Division | 42 | 2 | 6 | 1 | 8 | 0 | 0 | 0 | 0 | 0 | 56 | 3 |
| Southampton | 1979–80 | First Division | 26 | 1 | 1 | 0 | 1 | 0 | 0 | 0 | 0 | 0 | 28 | 1 |
| Southampton | Total | | 132 | 9 | 17 | 2 | 12 | 0 | 0 | 0 | 0 | 0 | 161 | 11 |
| Philadelphia Fury (loan) | 1978 | NASL | 25 | 5 | – | | – | | – | | – | | 25 | 5 |
| Philadelphia Fury (loan) | 1979 | NASL | 8 | 0 | – | | – | | – | | – | | 8 | 0 |
| Philadelphia Fury (loan) | Total | | 33 | 5 | – | | – | | – | | – | | 33 | 5 |
| Vancouver Whitecaps | 1979 | NASL | 15 | 8 | – | | – | | – | | – | | 15 | 8 |
| Vancouver Whitecaps | 1980 | NASL | 16 | 2 | – | | – | | – | | – | | 16 | 2 |
| Vancouver Whitecaps | Total | | 31 | 10 | – | | – | | – | | – | | 31 | 10 |
| Blackpool | 1980–81 | Third Division | 30 | 5 | 2 | 0 | 3 | 0 | 0 | 0 | 3 (Note: Appearances in Anglo-Scottish Cup) | 0 | 38 | 5 |
| Southampton | 1980–81 | First Division | 10 | 0 | 0 | 0 | 0 | 0 | 0 | 0 | 0 | 0 | 10 | 0 |
| Southampton | 1981–82 | First Division | 41 | 1 | 1 | 0 | 1 | 0 | 4 | 0 | 0 | 0 | 47 | 1 |
| Southampton | 1982–83 | First Division | 12 | 1 | 0 | 0 | 2 | 0 | 2 | 0 | 0 | 0 | 16 | 1 |
| Southampton | Total | | 63 | 2 | 1 | 0 | 3 | 0 | 6 | 0 | 0 | 0 | 73 | 2 |
| Floreat Athena (loan) | 1982 | West Australian Football League | 3 | 2 | 0 | 0 | 0 | 0 | 0 | 0 | 0 | 0 | 3 | 2 |
| Eastern | 1982–83 | Hong Kong First Division League | | | | | | | | | | | 12+ | 0+ |
| Bristol Rovers | 1983–84 | Third Division | 17 | 2 | 0 | 0 | 0 | 0 | 0 | 0 | 0 | 0 | 17 | 2 |
| Career total | | | 821+ | 187+ | 76+ | 16+ | 48+ | 7+ | 16+ | 4+ | 4+ | 0+ | 977+ | 214+ |

=== International ===
Appearances and goals by national team and year
| National team | Year | Apps | Goals |
|---|---|---|---|
| England | 1965 | 4 | 1 |
| England | 1966 | 13 | 0 |
| England | 1967 | 5 | 3 |
| England | 1968 | 6 | 0 |
| England | 1969 | 8 | 0 |
| England | 1970 | 10 | 3 |
| England | 1971 | 7 | 0 |
| England | 1972 | 5 | 1 |
| England | 1973 | 7 | 0 |
| England | 1974 | 1 | 0 |
| England | 1975 | 6 | 0 |
| Total | | 72 | 8 |

=== International goals ===
Scores and results list England's goal tally first, score column indicates score after each Ball goal.

List of international goals scored by Alan Ball
| No. | Date | Venue | Opponent | Score | Result | Competition | Ref(s) |
|---|---|---|---|---|---|---|---|
| 1. | 16 May 1965 | Stockholm, Sweden | Sweden | 1–0 | 2–1 | Friendly | |
| 2. | 27 May 1967 | Vienna, Austria | Austria | 1–0 | 1–0 | Friendly | |
| 3. | 21 October 1967 | Cardiff, Wales | Wales | 3–0 | 3–0 | 1967–68 British Home Championship | |
| 4. | 6 December 1967 | London, England | Soviet Union | 1–0 | 2–2 | Friendly | |
| 5. | 25 February 1970 | Brussels, Belgium | Belgium | 1–0 | 3–1 | Friendly | |
| 6. | 25 February 1970 | Brussels, Belgium | Belgium | 3–1 | 3–1 | Friendly | |
| 7. | 21 May 1970 | Bogotá, Colombia | Colombia | 4–0 | 4–0 | Friendly | |
| 8. | 27 May 1972 | Glasgow, Scotland | Scotland | 1–0 | 1–0 | 1971–72 British Home Championship | |

=== Manager ===
Managerial record by team and tenure
| Team | From | To | Record | | | | |
| Team | From | To | P | W | D | L | Win % |
|---|---|---|---|---|---|---|---|
| Blackpool | 1 July 1980 | 28 February 1981 | 34 | 7 | 10 | 17 | 20.6 |
| Portsmouth | 11 May 1984 | 17 January 1989 | 222 | 94 | 58 | 70 | 42.3 |
| Stoke City | 7 November 1989 | 23 February 1991 | 62 | 17 | 21 | 24 | 27.4 |
| Exeter City | 6 August 1991 | 20 January 1994 | 135 | 36 | 43 | 56 | 26.7 |
| Southampton | 21 January 1994 | 2 July 1995 | 67 | 22 | 24 | 21 | 32.8 |
| Manchester City | 3 July 1995 | 27 August 1996 | 49 | 13 | 14 | 22 | 26.5 |
| Portsmouth | 26 January 1998 | 9 December 1999 | 97 | 28 | 26 | 43 | 28.9 |
| Total | | | 666 | 217 | 196 | 253 | 32.6 |

== Honours ==
=== As a player ===
Everton

- Football League First Division: 1969–70
- FA Charity Shield: 1970
- FA Cup runner-up: 1967–68

Arsenal

- FA Cup runner-up: 1971–72

Southampton

- Football League Second Division runner-up: 1977–78
- Football League Cup runner-up: 1978–79

Vancouver Whitecaps

- North American Soccer League Soccer Bowl: 1979
- North American Soccer League National Conference Western Division: 1979

England

- FIFA World Cup: 1966

Individual

- Ballon d'Or nominee: 1966, 1967, 1968, 1970.
- Rothman's Golden Boots Awards: 1970, 1973
- Southampton Player of the Season: 1977–78
- Arsenal Player of the Season: 1973–74
- English Football Hall of Fame: 2003

=== As a manager ===
Individual

- Premier League Manager of the Month: November 1995

=== Orders and inductions ===
In 2000, Ball and four other members of the World Cup winning team were appointed MBE for their services to football. Ball, along with Roger Hunt, Nobby Stiles, Ray Wilson and George Cohen, had to wait more than three decades for official recognition of their achievements.

In 2003 Ball was inducted into the English Football Hall of Fame.

In 2011, the Canadian Soccer Hall of Fame inducted the 1979 NASL champion Vancouver Whitecaps team. Ball was a vital member of this squad. He was also named a 2nd Team NASL All-Star (Best XI) for that season, and the MVP of the 1979 NASL playoffs.

Ball was inducted into the Hall of Fame at Bloomfield Road, when it was officially opened by former Blackpool player Jimmy Armfield in April 2006. Organised by the Blackpool Supporters Association, Blackpool fans around the world voted on their all-time heroes. Five players from each decade are inducted; Ball is in the 1960s.

Ball was inducted into Everton's hall of fame "Everton Giants" in 2001, and at the start of the 2003–04 season, as part of the club's official celebration of their 125th anniversary, was elected by fans as a member of the greatest ever team.

== See also ==
- List of men's footballers with the most official appearances
