= Colin Irwin (footballer) =

English footballer

Personal information
- Full name: Colin Thomas Irwin
- Date of birth: 9 February 1957 (age 69)
- Place of birth: Liverpool, England
- Height: 6 ft 1 in (1.85 m)
- Position: Defender

Senior career*
Years	Team	Apps	(Gls)
1977–1981	Liverpool	29	(3)
1981–1984	Swansea City	48	(0)
Total		77	(3)

Managerial career
- 1985–1987: Bolton Wanderers (Assistant Manager)
- * Club domestic league appearances and goals

Colin Thomas Irwin (born 9 February 1957) is an English former professional footballer of the early 1980s.

A defender, able to play at left-back or in the centre, Irwin came through the youth ranks at Liverpool, and his first call-up to the first-team squad came, remarkably, in the 1978 European Cup Final. Irwin did not get on the pitch, but Liverpool won the game, and Irwin collected a winners medal.

He was not involved in the first-team squad for all the 1978–79 season, but he made his debut early the following season, against West Bromwich Albion, and went on to make 14 appearances throughout the season.

1980–81 saw a revamp of the Liverpool squad, with many young players given their chance, including Irwin. Although not an automatic first-team selection, he made 30 appearances and was a regular squad member as Liverpool won the League Cup and European Cup.

The summer of 1981 saw Liverpool sign Mark Lawrenson, Irwin was made surplus, and he and other players released by Liverpool moved on to Swansea, managed by John Toshack, for £340,000. This was the club's record transfer paid. Much of it was still owing when the club went bankrupt in 1984, and settled in when they paid out £400,000 for Ashley Williams. He was made captain, but suffered a knee injury in 1983 which forced him to retire.

Following retirement, he served as a coach at Bolton Wanderers, under former teammate Phil Neal, from 1985 to 1987.

== Honours ==
Liverpool

- Football League First Division: 1979–80
- Football League Cup: 1980–81
- FA Charity Shield: 1980
- European Cup: 1977–78, 1980–81

Swansea City

- Welsh Cup: 1982, 1983
