= 1974–75 Arsenal F.C. season =

English football club season

Arsenal
1974–75 season
- Chairman: Denis Hill-Wood
- Manager: Bertie Mee
- First Division: 16th
- FA Cup: Sixth round
- League Cup: Second round
- Top goalscorer: League: Brian Kidd (19); All: Brian Kidd (23)
- Highest home attendance: 56,742 West Ham United (8 March 1975)
- Lowest home attendance: 16,540 Newcastle United (18 March 1975)
- Average home league attendance: 28,315
Home colours	Away colours	Third colours

The 1974–75 season was Arsenal Football Club's 49th consecutive season in the Football League First Division. Arsenal finished sixteenth in the league, their poorest position since Herbert Chapman became manager in 1925. They reached the quarterfinals of the FA Cup but lost to West Ham.

Ray Kennedy departed the club for Liverpool. Arsenal used the money to buy Brian Kidd who went on to be their top scorer for the season. Alan Ball served as captain.

== Season summary ==
In the summer, Mee oversaw the departure of midfielder Ray Kennedy after his sub-par second half to the previous season. Kennedy was sold to Liverpool for £200,000. Arsenal then bought Brian Kidd for £100,000 from Manchester United who went on to be top scorer but failed partner successfully with John Radford in the midfield.

Alan Ball was appointed captain for the season as he recovered from his broken leg. He fractured his ankle the first match of the pre-season and was absent for the beginning of the season.

Arsenal's league campaign started fairlyale poorly. After winning the first match thanks to Kidd's goal against Leicester, Arsenal went ten games without a win. Kidd repeated his goal against Leicester to tie in the League Cup, but Arsenal lost the replay, knocking them out of the competition. In the midst of Arsenal's struggles, Jeff Blockley and Charlie George were put on the transfer list. Blockley left for Leicester in January. Desperate, Mee brought in Terry Mancini for £20,000. He also bought Alex Cropley from Hibs for £150,000. Unfortunately, Cropley broke his leg seven games into his Arsenal career and never fully recovered.

Arsenal's league form, despite the additions, was inconsistent. The FA Cup brought some respite, as Arsenal made it past Second Division York with a hat-trick from Kidd in the replay. After beating Coventry City, Arsenal were forced into a second replay with Leicester, winning thanks to a goal from Radford. However, prior to their quarterfinal appearance against West Ham, both Ball and Bob McNab were sent off for dissent in a league game against Derby. The club refused to back their appeals for their bookings, meaning both players would be unavailable for the cup tie. Arsenal were knocked out of the FA Cup.

At the end of the season, Arsenal had to fight for their position in the league to escape relegation. Increasingly disillusioned and unhappy, the team managed to beat the drop, finishing 16th.

== League standings ==
Pos	Team	Pld	W	D	L	GF	GA	GAv	Pts
14	Coventry City	42	12	15	15	51	62	0.823	39
15	Newcastle United	42	15	9	18	59	72	0.819	39
16	Arsenal	42	13	11	18	47	49	0.959	37
17	Birmingham City	42	14	9	19	53	61	0.869	37
18	Leicester City	42	12	12	18	46	60	0.767	36

Source: World Football
Rules for classification: 1) Points; 2) Goal average; 3) Goals scored

== Results ==
Arsenal's score comes first

=== Legend ===
Win	Draw	Loss

=== Football League First Division ===
Date	Opponent	Venue	Result	Attendance	Scorers
17 August 1974	Leicester City	A	1–0	26,448	Kidd
20 August 1974	Ipswich Town	H	0–1	31,027	
24 August 1974	Manchester City	H	4–0	27,143	Kidd (2), Radford (2)
27 August 1974	Ipswich Town	A	0–3	28,036	
31 August 1974	Everton	A	1–2	42,438	Kidd
7 September 1974	Burnley	H	0–1	23,586	
14 September 1974	Chelsea	A	0–0	34,596	
21 September 1974	Luton Town	H	2–2	21,649	Kidd (2)
28 September 1974	Birmingham City	A	1–3	25,584	George
5 October 1974	Leeds United	A	0–2	32,784	
12 October 1974	Queens Park Rangers	H	2–2	26,690	Kidd, Radford
16 October 1974	Manchester City	A	1–2	26,658	Radford
19 October 1974	Tottenham Hotspur	A	0–2	36,194	
26 October 1974	West Ham United	H	3–0	41,004	Brady, Kidd, Radford
2 November 1974	Wolverhampton Wanderers	H	0–0	27,572	
9 November 1974	Liverpool	A	3–1	43,850	Ball (2), Brady
16 November 1974	Derby County	H	3–1	32,286	Ball (2; 1 pen.), Kidd
23 November 1974	Coventry City	A	0–3	15,669	
30 November 1974	Middlesbrough	H	2–0	25,283	Ball (pen.), Brady
7 December 1974	Carlisle United	A	1–2	12,926	Kidd
14 December 1974	Leicester City	H	0–0	20,849	
21 December 1974	Stoke City	A	2–0	23,292	Kidd (2)
26 December 1974	Chelsea	H	1–2	33,784	Ball (pen.)
28 December 1974	Sheffield United	A	1–1	19,967	George
11 January 1975	Carlisle United	H	2–1	21,538	Cropley, Radford
18 January 1975	Middlesbrough	A	0–0	26,996	
1 February 1975	Liverpool	H	2–0	43,028	Ball (2; 1 pen.)
8 February 1975	Wolverhampton Wanderers	A	0–1	19,807	
22 February 1975	Derby County	A	1–2	24,002	Radford
1 March 1975	Everton	H	0–2	32,216	
15 March 1975	Birmingham City	H	1–1	17,845	Kidd
18 March 1975	Newcastle United	H	3–0	16,540	Ball (pen.), Kidd, Rostron
22 March 1975	Burnley	A	3–3	17,539	Hornsby (2), Rostron
25 March 1975	Luton Town	A	0–2	22,120	
29 March 1975	Stoke City	H	1–1	26,852	Kelly
31 March 1975	Sheffield United	H	1–0	24,338	Kidd
8 April 1975	Coventry City	H	2–0	17,291	Kidd (2)
12 April 1975	Leeds United	H	1–2	36,619	Kidd
19 April 1975	Queens Park Rangers	A	0–0	24,362	
23 April 1975	Newcastle United	A	1–3	21,895	Hornsby
26 April 1975	Tottenham Hotspur	H	1–0	43,762	Kidd
28 April 1975	West Ham United	A	0–1	30,195	

=== FA Cup ===
Round	Date	Opponent	Venue	Result	Attendance	Goalscorers
R3	4 January 1975	York City	H	1–1	27,029	Kelly
R3 R	7 January 1975	York City	A	3–1	15,362	Kidd (3)
R4	25 January 1975	Coventry City	A	1–1	31,165	Ball
R4 R	29 January 1975	Coventry City	H	3–0	30,867	Armstrong, Matthews (2)
R5	15 February 1975	Leicester City	H	0–0	43,841	
R5 R	19 February 1975	Leicester City	A	1–1	35,009	Radford
R5 2R	24 February 1975	Leicester City	A	1–0 (aet)	39,025	Radford
R6	8 March 1975	West Ham United	H	0–2	56,742	

=== League Cup ===
Round	Date	Opponent	Venue	Result	Attendance	Goalscorers
R2	10 September 1974	Leicester City	H	1–1	20,788	Kidd
R2R	18 September 1974	Leicester City	A	1–2	17,303	Brady

== Squad ==
Note: Flags indicate national team as defined under FIFA eligibility rules; some limited exceptions apply. Players may hold more than one non-FIFA nationality.

Pos.	Nation	Player
GK	ENG	Jimmy Rimmer
DF	NIR	Pat Rice
DF	ENG	Bob McNab
MF	SCO	Eddie Kelly
DF	IRL	Terry Mancini
DF	ENG	Peter Simpson
MF	ENG	Peter Storey
MF	ENG	Alan Ball
MF	IRL	Liam Brady
FW	ENG	Brian Kidd
FW	ENG	John Radford

Pos.	Nation	Player
MF	ENG	George Armstrong
MF	ENG	John Matthews
DF	NIR	Sammy Nelson
MF	ENG	Brian Hornsby
FW	ENG	Charlie George
MF	SCO	Alex Cropley
DF	ENG	Jeff Blockley
DF	ENG	Wilf Rostron
DF	ENG	Richie Powling
GK	ENG	Geoff Barnett
MF	ENG	Trevor Ross
FW	IRL	Frank Stapleton
MF	ENG	David Price
