= 1975–76 Arsenal F.C. season =

English football club season

Arsenal
1975–76 season
- Chairman: Denis Hill-Wood
- Manager: Bertie Mee
- First Division: 17th
- FA Cup: Third round
- League Cup: Second round
- Top goalscorer: League: Brian Kidd (11); All: Brian Kidd (11)
Home colours	Away colours

The 1975–76 season was Arsenal Football Club's 50th consecutive season in the Football League First Division. Arsenal finished seventeenth in the league, one position worse than the previous season, their worst finish since Herbert Chapman became manager of the club in 1925. Arsenal failed to find success in either the FA Cup or League Cup.

Manager Bertie Mee retired at the end of the season.

== Season summary ==
Bob McNab and Charlie George both departed Arsenal prior to the beginning of the season. McNab left on a free transfer to Wolves while George nearly joined manager Terry Neill at Tottenham but was tempted last-minute by Derby for £90,000. Alan Ball also requested a transfer but did not receive it. He was instead dropped for the opening games of the season and Eddie Kelly became the captain. This became a source of tension as many of the players still looked to Ball for leadership.

Arsenal were knocked out of the League Cup at home by Everton and soon after, exited the FA Cup thanks to a loss to Wolves. Arsenal's season quickly became a fight against relegation.

Youngsters Frank Stapleton and David O'Leary both featured regularly in the first team. Within the team, morale was low. In March, Peter Storey walked out for ten days and faced a club suspension. Bertie Mee soon announced his own retirement at the end of the season.

Arsenal's season neared the end with an essential game in the battle for relegation between the 17th place Gunners and the 19th place Wolves. Terry Mancini's only first-team goal against Wolves ensured Arsenal stayed up that season, despite three consecutive losses closing out the season.

== Final league table ==
Pos	Team	Pld	W	D	L	GF	GA	GAv	Pts
15	Newcastle United	42	15	9	18	71	62	1.145	39
16	Aston Villa	42	11	17	14	51	59	0.864	39
17	Arsenal	42	13	10	19	47	53	0.887	36
18	West Ham United	42	13	10	19	48	71	0.676	36
19	Birmingham City	42	13	7	22	57	75	0.760	33

Source: World Football
Rules for classification: 1) Points; 2) Goal average; 3) Goals scored

== Results ==
Arsenal's score comes first

=== Legend ===
Win	Draw	Loss

=== Football League First Division ===
Date	Opponent	Venue	Result	Attendance	Scorers
16 August 1975	Burnley	A	0–0		
19 August 1975	Sheffield United	A	3–1		Rice, Kidd, Brady
23 August 1975	Stoke City	H	0–1		
26 August 1975	Norwich City	H	2–1		Kelly, Ball
30 August 1975	Wolverhampton Wanderers	A	0–0		
6 September 1975	Leicester City	H	1–1		Stapleton
13 September 1975	Aston Villa	A	0–2		
20 September 1975	Everton	H	2–2		Stapleton, Kidd
27 September 1975	Tottenham Hotspur	A	0–0		
4 October 1975	Manchester City	H	2–3		Ball, Cropley
11 October 1975	Coventry City	H	5–0		Ball, Cropley (2), Kidd (2)
18 October 1975	Manchester United	A	1–3		Kelly
25 October 1975	Middlesbrough	H	2–1		Cropley, Hornsby
1 November 1975	Newcastle United	A	0–2		
8 November 1975	Derby County	H	0–1		
15 November 1975	Birmingham City	A	1–3		Ball
22 November 1975	Manchester United	H	3–1		Ball, Armstrong, Greenhoff o.g.
29 November 1975	West Ham United	A	0–1		
2 December 1975	Liverpool	A	2–2	47,751	Ball, Kidd
6 December 1975	Leeds United	H	1–2		Brady
13 December 1975	Stoke City	A	1–2		Armstrong
20 December 1975	Burnley	H	1–0		Radford
26 December 1975	Ipswich Town	A	0–2		
27 December 1975	Queen's Park Rangers	H	2–0		Ball, Kidd
10 January 1976	Aston Villa	H	0–0		
17 January 1976	Leicester City	A	1–2		Ross
31 January 1976	Sheffield United	H	1–0		Brady
7 February 1976	Norwich City	A	1–3		Kidd
18 February 1976	Derby County	A	0–2		
21 February 1976	Birmingham City	H	1–0		Brady
24 February 1976	Liverpool	H	1–0		Radford
28 February 1976	Middlesbrough	A	1–0		Radford
13 March 1976	Coventry City	A	1–1		Powling
16 March 1976	Newcastle United	H	0–0		
20 March 1976	West Ham United	H	6–1		Armstrong, Ball (2), Kidd (3)
27 March 1976	Leeds United	A	0–3		
3 April 1976	Tottenham Hotspur	H	0–2		
10 April 1976	Everton	A	0–0		
13 April 1976	Wolverhampton Wanderers	H	2–1		Cropley, Mancini
17 April 1976	Ipswich Town	H	1–2	26,659	Stapleton
19 April 1976	Queen's Park Rangers	A	1–2		Kidd
24 April 1976	Manchester City	A	1–3		Armstrong

=== FA Cup ===
Round	Date	Opponent	Venue	Result	Attendance	Goalscorers
R3	3 January 1976	Wolverhampton Wanderers	A	0–3		

=== League Cup ===
Round	Date	Opponent	Venue	Result	Attendance	Goalscorers
R2	9 September 1975	Everton	A	2–2		Cropley 65'; Stapleton 89'
R2R	23 September 1975	Everton	H	0–1		

== Squad ==
Note: Flags indicate national team as defined under FIFA eligibility rules; some limited exceptions apply. Players may hold more than one non-FIFA nationality.

Pos.	Nation	Player
GK	ENG	Jimmy Rimmer
DF	NIR	Pat Rice
DF	NIR	Sammy Nelson
DF	ENG	Richie Powling
DF	ENG	Terry Mancini
DF	IRL	David O'Leary
MF	ENG	George Armstrong
MF	ENG	Alan Ball
FW	IRL	Frank Stapleton
FW	ENG	Brian Kidd
MF	IRL	Liam Brady

Pos.	Nation	Player
MF	SCO	Alex Cropley
MF	SCO	Eddie Kelly
MF	ENG	Trevor Ross
FW	ENG	John Radford
DF	ENG	Peter Storey
DF	ENG	Peter Simpson
DF	ENG	Wilf Rostron
GK	ENG	Geoff Barnett
MF	ENG	John Matthews

== Top scorers ==
Football League First Division

- Brian Kidd - 11
- Alan Ball - 9
- Liam Brady - 5
