= 1976–77 Arsenal F.C. season =

English football club season

Arsenal
1976–1977 season
- Chairman: Denis Hill-Wood
- Manager: Terry Neill
- First Division: 8th place
- FA Cup: 5th round
- League Cup: Quarter finals
- Top goalscorer: League: Malcolm Macdonald (25); All: Malcolm Macdonald (29)
- Highest home attendance: 52,285 vs Chelsea (26 October 1976)
- Lowest home attendance: 19,517 vs West Bromwich Albion (23 October 1976)
- Average home league attendance: 32,671
| Home colours | Away colours |

The 1976–77 season was Arsenal Football Club's 51st consecutive season in the Football League First Division. The first season under new manager Terry Neill, Arsenal finished eighth in the league and reached the quarterfinals of the League Cup.

New signing Malcolm Macdonald was Arsenal's top scorer. Long-tenured defender Pat Rice assumed the captaincy. Neill oversaw significant turnover in the side throughout the season, seeing the exodus of players such as Alan Ball and John Radford. Along with Macdonald, Neill brought in players like Willie Young and Alan Hudson.

== Season summary ==
In the 1976–77 season, former Tottenham boss Terry Neill was recruited by the Arsenal board to replace Bertie Mee in the summer. At the age of 34 he became the youngest Arsenal manager to date. Neill brought his number two, Wilf Dixon, from Spurs. Bobby Campbell, the previous coach, left the club a few weeks later to become Fulham's coach. Alan Ball, who had favoured Campbell to become the next manager, was ousted with a move to Southampton for £60,000 in December.

As would become a trademark of Neill's management, Neill looked to bring in a big-name striker. Newcastle's star Malcolm Macdonald was available and Neill got him for £333,333, a British transfer record. Macdonald formed a fruitful partnership with Frank Stapleton.

Arsenal started the season well with just two defeats in their first nine league games but their title challenge soon began to fade. Arsenal relied heavily on Macdonald for goals. He rewarded them, scoring hat-tricks against both Newcastle and Birmingham. However, when Macdonald went through a poor run of form, Arsenal followed, finding 8 defeats in 11 league games picking up just 3 points out of the possible 22. The Gunners finished the season in a disappointing 8th place.

In the FA Cup, Arsenal easily beat Notts County and Coventry City. However, their run ended against Middlesbrough in a 4–1 loss. Arsenal penetrated deeper into the League Cup, beating Carlisle United before taking their tie with Blackpool to a second replay before triumphing. Arsenal overcame Chelsea in a 2–1 victory at home in front of a season-record crowd to reach the quarterfinals. They lost 2–1 to Queens Park Rangers, ending their League Cup run.

By the end of the season, only two members of the 1971 Double side remained in the first team: George Armstrong and Pat Rice. Armstrong left for Leicester at the end of the season. There were many other departures. John Radford, having lost his place to Stapleton, left to West Ham in December after 14 years at the club, playing 383 league games. Peter Storey was another player to leave, being unable to hold down a first-team place. He moved to Fulham for £10,000 and retired a few games later. Neill also moved Eddie Kelly to QPR, Alex Cropley (£135,000 to Aston Villa), and Terry Mancini (Aldershot). He brought in Willie Young who he had known at Spurs, and Alan Hudson in the spring for £200,000 from Stoke.

== Final league table ==
| Pos | Team | Pld | W | D | L | GF | GA | GD | Pts | Qualification or relegation |
|---|---|---|---|---|---|---|---|---|---|---|
| 6 | Manchester United | 42 | 18 | 11 | 13 | 71 | 62 | +9 | 47 | Qualification for the European Cup Winners' Cup first round (Note: Manchester United qualified for the European Cup Winners' Cup first round as the 1976–77 FA Cup winners.) |
| 7 | West Bromwich Albion | 42 | 16 | 13 | 13 | 62 | 56 | +6 | 45 | |
| 8 | Arsenal | 42 | 16 | 11 | 15 | 64 | 59 | +5 | 43 | |
| 9 | Everton | 42 | 14 | 14 | 14 | 62 | 64 | −2 | 42 | |
| 10 | Leeds United | 42 | 15 | 12 | 15 | 48 | 51 | −3 | 42 | |

Source: World Football
Rules for classification: 1) Points; 2) Goal difference; 3) Goals scored

== Results ==
Arsenal's score comes first

=== Legend ===
| Win | Draw | Loss |

=== Football League First Division ===
| Date | Opponent | Venue | Result | Attendance | Scorers |
|---|---|---|---|---|---|
| 21 August 1976 | Bristol City | H | 0–1 | 41,082 | |
| 25 August 1976 | Norwich City | A | 3–1 | 26,769 | Macdonald, Nelson, Stapleton |
| 28 August 1976 | Sunderland | A | 2–2 | 41,211 | Macdonald, Ross |
| 4 September 1976 | Manchester City | H | 0–0 | 35,132 | |
| 11 September 1976 | West Ham United | A | 2–0 | 31,965 | Ross, Stapleton |
| 18 September 1976 | Everton | H | 3–1 | 34,076 | Brady, Macdonald, Stapleton |
| 25 September 1976 | Ipswich Town | A | 1–3 | 25,505 | Hunter (own goal) |
| 2 October 1976 | Queens Park Rangers | H | 3–2 | 39,442 | Brady, Rice, Stapleton |
| 16 October 1976 | Stoke City | H | 2–0 | 28,745 | Macdonald, Rice |
| 20 October 1976 | Aston Villa | A | 1–5 | 33,860 | Ball |
| 23 October 1976 | Leicester City | A | 1–4 | 19,351 | Stapleton |
| 30 October 1976 | Leeds United | A | 1–2 | 33,566 | Matthews |
| 6 November 1976 | Birmingham City | H | 4–0 | 23,063 | Stapleton, Macdonald (pen.), Nelson, Ross |
| 20 November 1976 | Liverpool | H | 1–1 | 45,016 | Armstrong |
| 27 November 1976 | Coventry City | A | 2–1 | 18,313 | Macdonald, Stapleton |
| 4 December 1976 | Newcastle United | H | 5–3 | 35,000 | Macdonald (3), Ross, Stapleton |
| 15 December 1976 | Derby County | A | 0–0 | 24,016 | |
| 18 December 1976 | Manchester United | H | 3–1 | 39,572 | Brady, Macdonald (2) |
| 27 December 1976 | Tottenham Hotspur | A | 2–2 | 47,751 | Macdonald (2) |
| 3 January 1977 | Leeds United | H | 1–1 | 44,090 | Macdonald |
| 15 January 1977 | Norwich City | H | 1–0 | 30,537 | Rice |
| 18 January 1977 | Birmingham City | A | 3–3 | 23,247 | Macdonald (3) |
| 22 January 1977 | Bristol City | A | 0–2 | 26,282 | |
| 5 February 1977 | Sunderland | H | 0–0 | 30,925 | |
| 12 February 1977 | Manchester City | A | 0–1 | 45,368 | |
| 15 February 1977 | Middlesbrough | A | 0–3 | 26,083 | |
| 19 February 1977 | West Ham United | H | 2–3 | 38,221 | Brady, Stapleton |
| 1 March 1977 | Everton | A | 1–2 | 29,802 | Macdonald |
| 5 March 1977 | Ipswich Town | H | 1–4 | 34,688 | Macdonald (pen.) |
| 8 March 1977 | West Bromwich Albion | H | 1–2 | 19,517 | Macdonald |
| 12 March 1977 | Queens Park Rangers | A | 1–2 | 26,191 | Young |
| 23 March 1977 | Stoke City | A | 1–1 | 13,951 | Price |
| 2 April 1977 | Leicester City | H | 3–0 | 23,013 | O'Leary (2), Rix |
| 9 April 1977 | West Bromwich Albion | A | 2–0 | 24,275 | Macdonald, Stapleton |
| 11 April 1977 | Tottenham Hotspur | H | 1–0 | 47,432 | Macdonald |
| 16 April 1977 | Liverpool | A | 0–2 | 48,174 | |
| 23 April 1977 | Coventry City | H | 2–0 | 22,790 | Macdonald, Stapleton |
| 25 April 1977 | Aston Villa | H | 3–0 | 23,961 | Armstrong, Macdonald, Nelson |
| 30 April 1977 | Newcastle United | A | 2–0 | 44,677 | Macdonald, Matthews |
| 3 May 1977 | Derby County | H | 0–0 | 26,659 | |
| 7 May 1977 | Middlesbrough | H | 1–1 | 23,911 | Stapleton |
| 14 May 1977 | Manchester United | A | 2–3 | 53,232 | Brady, Stapleton |

=== FA Cup ===
| Round | Date | Opponent | Venue | Result | Attendance | Goalscorers |
|---|---|---|---|---|---|---|
| R3 | 8 January 1977 | Notts County | A | 1–0 | 17,328 | Ross |
| R4 | 29 January 1977 | Coventry City | H | 3–1 | 41,078 | Macdonald (2), Stapleton |
| R5 | 26 February 1977 | Middlesbrough | A | 1–4 | 35,208 | Macdonald |

=== League Cup ===
| Round | Date | Opponent | Venue | Result | Attendance | Goalscorers |
|---|---|---|---|---|---|---|
| R2 | 31 August 1976 | Carlisle United | H | 3–2 | 21,550 | Macdonald, Ross (2) |
| R3 | 21 September 1976 | Blackpool | A | 1–1 | 18,983 | Armstrong |
| R3R | 28 September 1976 | Blackpool | H | 0–0 | 27,195 | |
| R3R2 | 5 October 1976 | Blackpool | H | 2–0 | 26,791 | Stapleton, O'Leary |
| R4 | 26 October 1976 | Chelsea | H | 2–1 | 52,285 | Ross, Stapleton |
| QF | 1 December 1976 | Queens Park Rangers | A | 1–2 | 27,621 | Stapleton |

== Squad ==
Note: Flags indicate national team as defined under FIFA eligibility rules; some limited exceptions apply. Players may hold more than one non-FIFA nationality.

| Pos. | Nation | Player |
|---|---|---|
| GK | ENG | Jimmy Rimmer |
| DF | NIR | Pat Rice |
| DF | NIR | Sammy Nelson |
| MF | ENG | Trevor Ross |
| DF | IRL | David O'Leary |
| DF | ENG | Peter Simpson |
| MF | IRL | Liam Brady |
| MF | ENG | Alan Hudson |
| FW | IRL | Frank Stapleton |
| FW | ENG | Malcolm Macdonald |
| MF | ENG | George Armstrong |

| Pos. | Nation | Player |
|---|---|---|
| MF | ENG | Alan Ball |
| DF | ENG | Pat Howard |
| MF | ENG | John Matthews |
| DF | SCO | Willie Young |
| DF | ENG | Richie Powling |
| DF | ENG | Peter Storey |
| MF | ENG | David Price |
| DF | ENG | Wilf Rostron |
| MF | ENG | Graham Rix |
| MF | SCO | Alex Cropley |
| FW | ENG | John Radford |
