= 1970–71 Arsenal F.C. season =

English football club season

Arsenal
1970–71 season
- Chairman: Denis Hill-Wood
- Manager: Bertie Mee
- First Division: 1st
- FA Cup: Winners
- League Cup: Fourth round
- Inter-Cities Fairs Cup: Quarter–finals
- Top goalscorer: League: Ray Kennedy (19); All: Ray Kennedy (26)
- Highest home attendance: 62,087 vs Chelsea (3 April 1971)
- Lowest home attendance: 26,379 vs Ipswich Town (28 September 1970)
- Average home league attendance: 43,776
Home colours	Away colours	Third colours

During the 1970–71 English football season, Arsenal F.C. competed in the Football League First Division. Arsenal became just the fourth side in history to win the league and FA Cup double.

For the first time in their history, Arsenal remained unbeaten at home for the entirety of the league campaign, losing just once there in all competitions – 0–2 to Crystal Palace in the Football League Cup fourth round replay.

== Season summary ==
Arsenal's summer transfer window was quiet, with the transfer of Bobby Gould to Wolves for £50,000 as the only major business. David Court was also sold to Luton Town. Arsenal had a fruitful preseason, beating Watford, Gothenburg Alliance (made up of players from the Gothenburg clubs), Kungsbacka, and Crystal Palace, and tying the Copenhagen Football Alliance.

Arsenal's season began away at Everton, the 1970 League Champions. Due to pre-season injuries, Arsenal was missing Peter Simpson (cartilage operation) and Jon Sammels (broken leg). John Roberts was deputized in defense, while Pat Rice served as right back. Everton dominated, going up 1-0. Arsenal managed to equalize on the break. John Radford set up the chance for Charlie George who collided with the goalkeeper as he scored, cracking two bones in his ankle. Everton continued to attack fiercely and scored a controversial goal, as Alan Ball had used both his head and hand to help secure an advantage for Everton. Arsenal managed to equalize through George Graham and the opening match of the season ended 2-2.

When Arsenal next faced off against West Ham, Peter Marinello and Ray Kennedy were included in the squad (Marinello for the penultimate time that season). Arsenal again took a point from the match. Finally playing at home, Arsenal defeated Manchester United 4–0 at Highbury with a hattrick from Radford. Kennedy and Radford's relationship would be essential for Arsenal's goalscoring throughout the season. Arsenal faced Huddersfield Town next, a tough game won by a Kennedy header in the last fifteen minutes. The victory took Arsenal top of the table, tied with Liverpool on points.

Arsenal lost their first game of the season away at Chelsea. After going down 1-0 thanks to a John Hollins goal, Eddie Kelly equalized with a header. Paddy Mulligan sealed the deal for Chelsea with his first League goal. Arsenal returned to Highbury to face Leeds United who were now top of the table with a perfect record. Arsenal tied Leeds 0-0 at home, despite Arsenal going down to ten men after Kelly was sent off for kicking Billy Bremner. Arsenal then hosted the North London Derby and beat Tottenham by two goals to none, the brace being scored by George Armstrong. However, captain Frank McLintock, who had become increasingly more important to Arsenal with each successive season as captain, picked up an injury though he would continue to play. Arsenal then travelled to bottom-of-the-table Burnley, which was to be a tough game. Arsenal took the lead in the fourth minute through Kennedy, but Burnley equalized on a corner. Arsenal pulled out the win late in the game with a goal from Radford.

Arsenal's goal for the season was to win the league. However, they also had a trophy to defend in the Inter Cities Fairs Cup. Their 1970-71 campaign began with a match against Lazio, a team featuring Giorgio Chinaglia and a very tough away crowd. Arsenal tied after going up with two goals from Radford. The teams met for a post-match reception at a restaurant which ended rather less amicably than the game. Kennedy was attacked by a Lazio player which then devolved into a brawl between the two teams. Arsenal won the home performance 2-0 with goals from Armstrong and Radford.

After a 6-2 drubbing of West Brom (their highest score of the season) in-between Arsenal's Fairs Cup matches, Arsenal's form slipped and they lost 5-0 to Stoke. Ipswich felt the backlash as Arsenal scored three goals in thirty-five minutes and won 4-0 with a brace from Kennedy in the League Cup. The 19-year-old Kennedy went on to score a hattrick in a 4-0 victory over Nottingham Forest in the league. Arsenal faced Luton in the third round of the League Cup where they snuck through with a 1-0 victory thanks to a Graham header. League play resumed against Newcastle and after going down by one goal, Graham once-again scored to get the tie. Arsenal then faced Everton away and brought home a 4-0 win. Kennedy had scored another brace and was called up for England's U-23 squad. Arsenal's goals were coming from all over the pitch.

Arsenal then faced Sturm Graz in the Fairs Cup. Due to the threat of snow in Austria, they switched the order of the legs so the Austrians would play at home first. Sturm Graz won their home leg 1-0, but Arsenal prevailed 2-0 at Highbury with goals from Kennedy and a penalty for Peter Storey after a Graham volley was handled on the line. Arsenal then returned to the League Cup where they lost to Crystal Palace at home, their first home loss in ten months.

Arsenal kept performing in the league. Kennedy scored his twelfth goal of the season against Coventry City, while Graham and Radford each netted another—Radford breaking a bone in his wrist in the process. Arsenal then faced Derby County with goals from Kelly and Radford. Radford scored again versus Blackpool who had won only twice all season. A tie with Crystal Palace precluded a run of five wins, though their next match against Ipswich was not one for the record books. A tough match, manager Bertie Mee had made several changes to the lineup including bringing in Jon Sammels and Peter Simpson for their first matches of the season. Up until this point, Arsenal had used only 14 players (with only one match for George and three for Marinello). Both Sammels and Simpson were to go on to contribute their fair share to the league and cup campaigns, while Roberts had played his final match for Arsenal. Ipswich dominated the game but it was Arsenal that walked away with three points.

Arsenal's next game was at home against Liverpool. Mee kept the same teamsheet as against Ipswich and the players were again incapable of making much of the game. Once Graham came in for Kelly as a substitute, the game changed. Graham scored and Radford finished off the 2-0 win. Arsenal then faced SK Beveren in the Fairs Cup in which Storey missed a penalty but Arsenal won 4-0. The team were still chasing Leeds United in the League. They beat Manchester City away. Bob Wilson, who had been excellent under pressure all season, put in yet another key performance. The City keeper Joe Corrigan mishandled a corner which led to an Armstrong goal. Radford scored again for a 2-0 victory. Arsenal then faced Wolves at home, the club to which Bobby Gould had been transferred over the summer. Arsenal won again with goals from Graham and Radford. The match put them just two points behind Leeds with half the season yet to go.

Arsenal continued their good run of form with a 3-1 victory away at Manchester United. They then tied on Boxing Day at home to Southampton on a freezing, snowy day. Following this game, George Armstrong apparently said: "I bet we win the Double." Arsenal then faced Yeovil Town in the third round of the FA Cup, a club well known to slay giants. Arsenal put them away 3-0. Back in the League, Arsenal went up against West Ham and beat them 2-0 (Graham and Kennedy). Leeds lost to Tottenham Hotspur at Elland Road, reducing the gap between them to just one point.

Arsenal then dropped two league matches in a row: a 2-1 loss to Huddersfield Town in which Frank McLintock broke his nose and required an operation, and a 2-0 loss to Liverpool which left Arsenal five points behind Leeds. In between them, Arsenal tied Portsmouth on a boggy pitch. After it was proven that the left back George Lay had dove to save a Radford shot, Arsenal received a penalty and scored through Storey. It seemed to be enough until Mike Trebilcock equalized with the last kick of the game. The replay at Highbury made Portsmouth only the fourth visiting club to score at the ground. It also marked Charlie George's first start in a senior match since his early season injury. Arsenal finally pulled out a 3-2 victory to go through to the next round of the cup.

Arsenal won again away at Manchester City, again thanks to an excellent performance by Wilson. Liverpool beat Leeds at Elland Road which closed the gap back to three points. Arsenal faced City again in the FA Cup whom they beat with a brace from George, one of which was a gorgeous free kick from outside the box. In February, manager Mee told his players they could expect two matches a week for the rest of the season and to aim for all three trophies. Arsenal followed up this talk with a 3-2 win over Ipswich, marred by a knee injury to George. Arsenal then lost 2-0 to Derby but soon had a game-in-hand over Leeds—against Wolves. Arsenal won 4-0 against the eventual fourth-place finishers, narrowing the gap to the top to five points with Leeds having played one game more. However, Leeds were also out of the FA Cup as they had lost to Fourth Division Colchester United 3-2.

Arsenal faced Leicester City in the FA Cup, a tough match that ended in a 0-0 tie. Arsenal were facing three big matches in a week: home to FC Koln in the Fairs Cup, Crystal Palace in the league, and Leicester in the FA Cup replay. Although Arsenal beat Koln 2-1 at home, the defence of the Fairs Cup ended with a quarter-final defeat to the West German side on away goals (agg. 2-2), with Koln's home goal being a controversial penalty. Arsenal beat Crystal Palace 2-0, a game which brought Sammel's only league goal of the campaign and an ankle injury to Charlie George. The Leicester replay proved tough. In front of Highbury's largest crowd of the season (over 57,000), Arsenal won 1-0 thanks to a disallowed Leicester goal and a George header.

In the league, the near-relegation Blackpool were another hard match. Storey scored his first ever goal with his head to take a 1-0 victory. Arsenal lost to Koln away and then faced Stoke City in the FA Cup semifinals. Arsenal were down 2-0 by halftime against Stoke, lucky not to be behind by more. In the second half, Storey scored on the counterattack to make the score 2-1. Stoke continued to attack, and George was injured once again. In injury time, McLintock headed the ball towards goal where John Mahoney handled the ball and Arsenal were awarded a penalty. Storey scored and the game ended 2-2. Arsenal had one more game to reach the FA Cup final against Liverpool, who had beaten Everton in the opposite match. In the replay, Arsenal scored in the 13th minute off of a corner. Kennedy scored a second goal at the beginning of the second half, and Arsenal won 2-0. The dream of the Double was alive.

Arsenal had ten League games before the FA Cup final. Leeds had lost to Chelsea and sat with 54 points from 35 games, while Arsenal had 48 points from 32 games. Arsenal had a tough match against Chelsea. Kennedy opened the scoring two minutes into the second half, and got a second one fifteen minutes from time. However, a scuffle at the end of the match between McLintock and Peter Osgood had McLintock on the ground in pain. Luckily, the damage was just a pinched nerve. Arsenal eked out a 1-0 win over Coventry, a game that may have ended in a win but was a match of survival. Kennedy had scored four goals in three games. Arsenal beat Southampton while Leeds dropped a point at Newcastle. Arsenal pushed aside Nottingham Forest 3-0 with three different goalscorers with Leeds dropping another point at Huddersfield.

Leeds had four games left in the league while Arsenal had six with only two points separating the two sides. Arsenal pulled again with a 1-0 victory over Newcastle thanks to a goal from George while Leeds lost at home to West Brom. Arsenal again won 1-0 over Burnley, confirming them to relegation with a penalty taken by George. Leeds returned to their winning ways and Arsenal were held to a 2-2 draw at West Brom before the two teams fighting for the title were to face each other. McLintock scored his third goal in five games, just after he had been chosen as Footballer of the Year, and Rice left the match with a twisted ankle. Going into the game against Leeds, Arsenal had 61 points from 39 matches and Leeds had 60 from 40.

Leeds needed a victory against Arsenal to keep their League dreams alive. They also had just reached the final of the Fairs Cup and were to play Juventus. The game between the two First Division heavy-hitters looked most likely to be a draw. Neither team looked likely to find a goal in the first half. However, in the dying moments of the game, the ball broke for Jack Charlton who put the ball past Wilson. It rebounded off the corner, only for Charlton to put it away. Arsenal exploded in frustration and Leeds were back on top of the division.

Both teams won their next games, Leeds against Nottingham Forest and Arsenal against Stoke. Storey limped off with a groin strain, bringing Kelly on. Twelve minutes after coming in, Kelly scored and Arsenal won 1-0. Leeds had no more matches to play and had ended the season with a 27-10-5 record. Arsenal had one game to go against Tottenham Hotspur at White Hart Lane. If Spurs won, they would qualify for European football. A win would clinch Arsenal the title, as would a 0–0 draw, as the goal average system(the division of goals scored by goals conceded) was still being used.

At White Hart Lane, they played Tottenham Hotspur, the last side to win the double, in the 1960–61 season, and Arsenal won. Storey was still out for the match with Kelly playing in his place. Chances occurred on both sides of the pitch, but no ball went in. However, three minutes from time, Kinnear tried to dribble in his own penalty area. The ever-enigmatic George regained the ball and crossed to Radford. Spurs goalkeeper Pat Jennings made an excellent save to deny the goal. Armstrong collected the deflection and crossed to Kennedy. This time, there was no save to be made. Arsenal had scored. If Tottenham were to tie it up, it would give the championship to Leeds. Wilson collected the final corner of the match and the whistle blew. Arsenal had won the league for the first time in eighteen years, a record eighth title.

Arsenal still had to go to Wembley to face Bill Shankly's Liverpool on 8 May. They had recently lost in two League Cup finals at the stadium, but it was time to go again. Storey was chosen in the side for the first time since his injury. Liverpool came on strong at the beginning of the match, but brought no reward. Still 0-0, both sides used their substitutes in the second half with Storey giving way to Kelly. Neither team could break the deadlock in ninety minutes and the game was to go on to extra time. Two minutes into additional time, Steve Heighway scored for Liverpool, slipping the ball on the inside of Wilson. Don Howe made the call that Graham should move from midfield to forward while the exhausted George should drop into midfield. In the last four minutes of the first period of extra time, Radford hooked a ball to Kelly whose shot bumbled into the goal - with or without a touch from Graham (Kelly received the official credit). Arsenal were now going for the replay and once again shifted the lagging George around on the field, back to a forward position. George interpassed with Radford before letting off a right-footed shot from 20 yards out. The ball went in and proved to be the winning goal. George's celebration of lying flat on his back is now Arsenal memory. Arsenal had defeated Liverpool and won the Double.

== Final league table ==
Pos	Team	Pld	W	D	L	GF	GA	GAv	Pts	Qualification or relegation
1	Arsenal (C)	42	29	7	6	71	29	2.448	65	Qualification for the European Cup first round
2	Leeds United	42	27	10	5	72	30	2.400	64	Qualification for the UEFA Cup first round
3	Tottenham Hotspur	42	19	14	9	54	33	1.636	52	Qualification for the UEFA Cup first round
4	Wolverhampton Wanderers	42	22	8	12	64	54	1.185	52	Qualification for the UEFA Cup first round
5	Liverpool	42	17	17	8	42	24	1.750	51	Qualification for the European Cup Winners' Cup first round (Note: Liverpool qualified for the European Cup Winners' Cup as FA Cup runners-up, as winners, Arsenal, qualified for the European Cup.)

Source: World Football
Rules for classification: 1) Points; 2) Goal average; 3) Goals scored
(C) Champions

== Results ==
Arsenal's score comes first

=== Legend ===
Win	Draw	Loss

=== Football League First Division ===
Date	Opponent	Venue	Result	Attendance	Scorers
15 August 1970	Everton	A	2–2	49,684	George, Graham
17 August 1970	West Ham United	A	0–0	39,004	
22 August 1970	Manchester United	H	4–0	54,117	Radford (3), Graham
25 August 1970	Huddersfield Town	H	1–0	34,848	Kennedy
29 August 1970	Chelsea	A	1–2	53,722	Kelly
1 September 1970	Leeds United	H	0–0	47,749	
5 September 1970	Tottenham Hotspur	H	2–0	48,931	Armstrong (2)
12 September 1970	Burnley	A	2–1	12,675	Kennedy, Radford
19 September 1970	West Bromwich Albion	H	6–2	33,326	Armstrong, Graham (2), Kennedy (2), (o.g.)
26 September 1970	Stoke City	A	0–5	18,153	
3 October 1970	Nottingham Forest	H	4–0	32,053	Armstrong, Kennedy (3)
10 October 1970	Newcastle United	A	1–1	38,024	Graham
17 October 1970	Everton	H	4–0	50,012	Kennedy (2), Storey (pen.), Kelly
24 October 1970	Coventry City	A	3–1	30,017	Graham, Kennedy, Radford
31 October 1970	Derby County	H	2–0	43,013	Radford, Kelly
7 November 1970	Blackpool	A	1–0	17,115	Radford
14 November 1970	Crystal Palace	H	1–1	34,503	Radford
21 November 1970	Ipswich Town	A	1–0	22,856	Armstrong
28 November 1970	Liverpool	H	2–0	45,097	Radford, Graham
5 December 1970	Manchester City	A	2–0	33,027	Armstrong, Radford
12 December 1970	Wolverhampton Wanderers	H	2–1	38,816	Graham, Radford
19 December 1970	Manchester United	A	3–1	33,182	Graham, Kennedy, McLintock
26 December 1970	Southampton	H	0–0	34,169	
9 January 1971	West Ham United	H	2–0	49,007	Graham, Kennedy
16 January 1971	Huddersfield Town	A	1–2	30,455	Kennedy
30 January 1971	Liverpool	A	0–2	43,847	
6 February 1971	Manchester City	H	1–0	46,122	Radford
20 February 1971	Ipswich Town	H	3–2	39,822	George, McLintock, Radford
27 February 1971	Derby County	A	0–2	35,875	
2 March 1971	Wolverhampton Wanderers	A	3–0	33,644	Armstrong, Kennedy, Radford
13 March 1971	Crystal Palace	A	2–0	35,022	Graham, Sammels
20 March 1971	Blackpool	H	1–0	37,372	Storey
3 April 1971	Chelsea	H	2–0	62,087	Kennedy (2)
6 April 1971	Coventry City	H	1–0	37,029	Kennedy
10 April 1971	Southampton	A	2–1	30,231	McLintock, Radford
13 April 1971	Nottingham Forest	A	3–0	40,727	George, Kennedy, McLintock
17 April 1971	Newcastle United	H	1–0	48,106	George
20 April 1971	Burnley	H	1–0	47,484	George (pen.)
24 April 1971	West Bromwich Albion	A	2–2	36,858	McLintock, (o.g.)
26 April 1971	Leeds United	A	0–1	48,350	
1 May 1971	Stoke City	H	1–0	55,011	Kelly
3 May 1971	Tottenham Hotspur	A	1–0	51,992	Kennedy

=== FA Cup ===
Round	Date	Opponent	Venue	Result	Attendance	Goalscorers
R3	6 January 1971	Yeovil Town	A	3–0	14,500	Kennedy, Radford (2)
R4	23 January 1971	Portsmouth	A	1–1	39,659	Storey (pen.)
R4 R	1 February 1971	Portsmouth	H	3–2	47,865	Storey (pen.), George, Simpson
R5	17 February 1971	Manchester City	A	2–1	45,105	George (2) 17', 49'
R6	6 March 1971	Leicester City	A	0–0	42,000	
R6 R	15 March 1971	Leicester City	H	1–0	57,443	George
SF	27 March 1971	Stoke City	N	2–2	55,000	Storey 47', (pen) 90')
SF R	31 March 1971	Stoke City	N	2–0	62,500	Graham 13', Kennedy 47'
F	8 May 1971	Liverpool	N	2–1 (aet)	100,000	Kelly 101', George 111'

=== League Cup ===
Round	Date	Opponent	Venue	Result	Attendance	Goalscorers
R2	8 September 1970	Ipswich Town	A	0–0	21,564	
R2 R	28 September 1970	Ipswich Town	H	4–0	26,379	Kennedy (2), Radford, Roberts
R3	6 October 1970	Luton Town	A	1–0	27,023	Graham
R4	28 October 1970	Crystal Palace	A	0–0	40,451	
R4 R	9 November 1970	Crystal Palace	H	0–2	45,026	

=== Inter-Cities Fairs Cup ===
Round	Date	Opponent	Venue	Result	Attendance	Goalscorers
R1 L1	16 September 1970	(Italy) Lazio	A	2–2	60,000	Radford (2)
R1 L2	23 September 1970	(Italy) Lazio	H	2–0	53,013	Armstrong, Radford
R2 L1	21 October 1970	(Austria) SK Sturm Graz	A	0–1	13,000	
R2 L2	4 November 1970	(Austria) SK Sturm Graz	H	2–0	37,667	Kennedy, Storey (pen.)
R3 L1	2 December 1970	(Belgium) Beveren	H	4–0	33,444	Kennedy (2), Graham, Sammels
R3 L2	16 December 1970	(Belgium) Beveren	A	0–0	16,000	
QF L1	9 March 1971	(West Germany) 1. FC Köln	H	2–1	40,007	McLintock, Storey
QF L2	23 March 1971	(West Germany) 1. FC Köln	A	0–1	50,000	

== Squad ==
Note: Flags indicate national team as defined under FIFA eligibility rules; some limited exceptions apply. Players may hold more than one non-FIFA nationality.

Pos.	Nation	Player
GK	SCO	Bob Wilson
GK	ENG	Terry Unwin
GK	ENG	Geoff Barnett
DF	NIR	Pat Rice
DF	SCO	Frank McLintock
DF	ENG	Peter Simpson
DF	ENG	Bob McNab
DF	NIR	Sammy Nelson
DF	WAL	John Roberts
MF	ENG	George Armstrong
MF	SCO	George Graham
MF	ENG	Jon Sammels

Pos.	Nation	Player
MF	ENG	Peter Storey
MF	SCO	Eddie Kelly
FW	ENG	Ray Kennedy
FW	ENG	John Radford
FW	ENG	Charlie George
FW	SCO	Peter Marinello
