= 1977–78 Arsenal F.C. season =

English football club season

Arsenal F.C.
1977–78 season
- Chairman: Denis Hill-Wood
- Manager: Terry Neill
- First Division: 5th
- FA Cup: Finalists
- League Cup: Semi-Finalists
- Top goalscorer: League: Malcolm Macdonald (15); All: Malcolm Macdonald (26)
Home colours	Away colours

The 1977–78 season was Arsenal Football Club's 52nd consecutive season in the Football League First Division. It was Terry Neill's second season as manager. Arsenal finished fifth in the league. In cup play, Arsenal reached the semi-finals in the League Cup, losing to the previous season's league and European champions Liverpool. Arsenal were also in the finals of the FA Cup, the first of three consecutive FA Cup finals that Arsenal would reach under Neill. They lost 1-0 to Ipswich.

In the transfer business, Pat Jennings joined the club from Tottenham Hotspur. He would go on to make over two-hundred appearances for Arsenal. Alan Sunderland joined Arsenal at centre forward where he would remain an important player for several seasons. Neill also brought in Don Howe as an assistant.

Malcom Macdonald was again Arsenal's top scorer.

== Season summary ==
Beginning with a difficult pre-season tour in Singapore and Australia, Terry Neill struggled with Malcolm Macdonald and Alan Hudson and disciplined them due to poor behaviour. Arsenal had relied heavily especially on Macdonald in previous seasons and the management was hoping to strengthen team play, which Macdonald found difficult at times.

After an eighth place finish in Neill's first season, the manager was looking to improve the squad. First, he brought in former Arsenal player and coach Don Howe for £40,000 as his assistant. Neill then looked to improve Arsenal's goalkeeping in the transfer market. Jimmy Rimmer, a solid performer in the 1975-76 season as Arsenal fought relegation, moved to Aston Villa. In came Pat Jennings at age 32 after spending thirteen years at Tottenham. Arsenal also brought in striker Alan Sunderland from Wolves for £70,000. Outgoing players included left-back Wilf Rostron, and midfielder (and former academy player) Trevor Ross.

Arsenal began the season with a 1-0 loss to Ipswich while playing in a hailstorm in what would be an echo of the FA Cup final later in the season. Arsenal, though performing better than the previous season, struggled with the squad depth to challenge for the league championship. They ended up fifth in league play.

In the League Cup, Arsenal beat Hull and Southampton at Highbury before going to a second game against Manchester City in the quarterfinals. Macdonald won a penalty which was put in by Liam Brady, who at that point had scored a goal every round. Arsenal then faced Liverpool, English and European Champions, in the semifinals. Arsenal lost 2-1 at Anfield, followed by a goalless draw at Highbury.

In the FA Cup, Arsenal beat Manchester United 3-2 in the second-round tie at Highbury. They then faced Walsall who had knocked Arsenal out of the FA Cup 45 years previous, beating them 4-1 soon after their semifinal loss to Liverpool in the League Cup. Arsenal beat Wrexham 3-2 in the next round before clearing Orient 3-0 in the semifinal. Arsenal was to face Bobby Robson's Ipswich in the final. Arsenal struggled with injury problems, with Sunderland recovering from a broken foot, Macdonald requiring a knee operation, and Brady being carried off with an injured ankle versus Liverpool. All of them featured in the game. Roger Osborne scored the only goal for Ipswich. Macdonald went into surgery three days later, the beginning of the end of his career.

== Squad ==
Note: Flags indicate national team as defined under FIFA eligibility rules; some limited exceptions apply. Players may hold more than one non-FIFA nationality.

Pos.	Nation	Player
GK	NIR	Pat Jennings
DF	NIR	Pat Rice
DF	NIR	Sammy Nelson
MF	ENG	David Price
DF	IRL	David O'Leary
DF	SCO	Willie Young
MF	IRL	Liam Brady
FW	ENG	Alan Sunderland
FW	ENG	Malcolm Macdonald
FW	IRL	Frank Stapleton
MF	ENG	Graham Rix

Pos.	Nation	Player
MF	ENG	Alan Hudson
MF	ENG	Trevor Ross
DF	ENG	Peter Simpson
MF	ENG	John Matthews
DF	ENG	Richie Powling
DF	IRL	John Devine
MF	ENG	Mark Heeley
DF	ENG	Steve Walford
MF	NIR	Jim Harvey

== Results ==
=== First Division ===
Pos	Team	Pld	W	D	L	GF	GA	GD	Pts	Qualification or relegation
3	Everton	42	22	11	9	76	45	+31	55	Qualification for the UEFA Cup first round
4	Manchester City	42	20	12	10	74	51	+23	52	Qualification for the UEFA Cup first round
5	Arsenal	42	21	10	11	60	37	+23	52	Qualification for the UEFA Cup first round
6	West Bromwich Albion	42	18	14	10	62	53	+9	50	Qualification for the UEFA Cup first round
7	Coventry City	42	18	12	12	75	62	+13	48	

Source: World Football
Rules for classification: 1) Points; 2) Goal difference; 3) Goals scored

20 August 1977 1	Ipswich Town	1–0	Arsenal	Ipswich
				Stadium: Portman Road

23 August 1977 2	Arsenal	1–0	Everton	London
				Stadium: Highbury

27 August 1977 3	Wolverhampton Wanderers	1–1	Arsenal	Wolverhampton
				Stadium: Highbury

3 September 1977 4	Arsenal	3–0	Nottingham Forest	London
				Stadium: Highbury

10 September 1977 5	Aston Villa	1–0	Arsenal	Birmingham
				Stadium: Villa Park

17 September 1977 6	Arsenal	2–1	Leicester City	London
				Stadium: Highbury

24 September 1977 7	Norwich City	1–0	Arsenal	Norwich
				Stadium: Carrow Road

1 October 1977 8	Arsenal	3–0	West Ham United	London
				Stadium: Highbury

4 October 1977 9	Arsenal	0–0	Liverpool	London
				Stadium: Highbury

8 October 1977 10	Manchester City	2–1	Arsenal	Manchester
				Stadium: Maine Road

15 October 1977 11	Arsenal	1–0	Queen's Park Rangers	London
				Stadium: Highbury

22 October 1977 12	Bristol City	0–2	Arsenal	Bristol
				Stadium: Ashton Gate

29 October 1977 13	Arsenal	1–1	Birmingham City	London
				Stadium: Highbury

5 November 1977 14	Manchester United	1–2	Arsenal	Manchester
				Stadium: Old Trafford

12 November 1977 15	Arsenal	1–1	Coventry City	London
				Stadium: Highbury

19 November 1977 16	Newcastle United	1–2	Arsenal	Newcastle Upon Tyne
				Stadium: St James' Park

26 November 1977 17	Arsenal	1–3	Derby County	London
				Stadium: Highbury

3 December 1977 18	Middlesbrough	0–1	Arsenal	Middlesbrough
				Stadium: Ayresome Park

10 December 1977 19	Arsenal	1–1	Leeds United	London
				Stadium: Highbury

17 December 1977 20	Coventry City	1–2	Arsenal	Coventry
				Stadium: Highfield Road

26 December 1977 21	Arsenal	3–0	Chelsea	London
				Stadium: Highbury

27 December 1977 22	West Bromwich Albion	1–3	Arsenal	West Bromwich
				Stadium: The Hawthorns

31 December 1977 23	Everton	2–0	Arsenal	Liverpool
				Stadium: Goodison Park

2 January 1978 24	Arsenal	1–0	Ipswich Town	London
				Stadium: Highbury

14 January 1978 25	Arsenal	3–1	Wolverhampton Wanderers	London
				Stadium: Highbury

21 January 1978 26	Nottingham Forest	2–0	Arsenal	Nottingham
				Stadium: City Ground

4 February 1978 27	Arsenal	0–1	Aston Villa	London
				Stadium: Highbury

11 February 1978 28	Leicester City	1–1	Arsenal	Leicester
				Stadium: Filbert Street

25 February 1978 29	West Ham United	2–2	Arsenal	London
				Stadium: Upton Park

28 February 1978 30	Arsenal	0–0	Norwich City	London
				Stadium: Highbury

4 March 1978 31	Arsenal	3–0	Manchester City	London
				Stadium: Highbury

18 March 1978 32	Arsenal	4–1	Bristol City	London
				Stadium: Highbury

21 March 1978 33	Birmingham City	1–1	Arsenal	Birmingham
				Stadium: St Andrew's

25 March 1978 34	Arsenal	4–0	West Bromwich Albion	London
				Stadium: Highbury

27 March 1978 35	Chelsea	0–0	Arsenal	London
				Stadium: Stamford Bridge

1 April 1978 36	Arsenal	3–1	Manchester United	London
				Stadium: Highbury

11 April 1978 37	Queen's Park Rangers	2–1	Arsenal	London
				Stadium: Loftus Road

15 April 1978 38	Arsenal	2–1	Newcastle United	London
				Stadium: Highbury

22 April 1978 39	Leeds United	1–3	Arsenal	Leeds
				Stadium: Elland Road

25 April 1978 40	Liverpool	1–0	Arsenal	Liverpool
				Stadium: Anfield

29 April 1978 41	Arsenal	1–0	Middlesbrough	London
				Stadium: Highbury

9 May 1978 42	Derby County	3–0	Arsenal	Derby
				Stadium: Baseball Ground

=== Football League Cup ===
30 August 1977 Second round	Arsenal	3–2	Manchester United	London
				Stadium: Highbury

25 October 1977 Third round	Arsenal	2–0	Southampton	London
				Stadium: Highbury

29 November 1977 Fourth round	Arsenal	5–1	Hull City	London
				Stadium: Highbury

18 January 1978 Quarter-final	Manchester City	0–0	Arsenal	Manchester
				Stadium: Maine Road

24 January 1978 Quarter-final replay	Arsenal	1–0	Manchester City	London
				Stadium: Highbury

7 February 1978 Semi-final; 1st leg	Liverpool	2–1	Arsenal	Liverpool
				Stadium: Anfield

14 February 1978 Semi-final; 2nd leg	Arsenal	0–0	Liverpool	London
				Stadium: Highbury

=== FA Cup ===
Arsenal entered the FA Cup in the third round proper, in which they were drawn to face Sheffield United.

7 January 1978 Third round	Sheffield United	0–5	Arsenal	Sheffield
				Stadium: Bramall Lane

28 January 1978 Fourth round	Arsenal	2–1	Wolverhampton Wanderers	London
				Stadium: Highbury

18 February 1978 Fifth round	Arsenal	4–1	Walsall	London
				Stadium: Highbury

11 March 1978 Sixth round	Wrexham	2–3	Arsenal	Wrexham
				Stadium: Racecourse Ground

8 April 1978 Semi-Final	Arsenal	3–0	Orient	London
				Stadium: Stamford Bridge

6 May 1978 Final	Arsenal	0–1	Ipswich Town	London
				Stadium: Wembley Stadium; Attendance: 100,000
