= 1972 FA Cup final =

English association football match

- Event: 1971–72 FA Cup
Leeds United	Arsenal
1	0
- Date: 6 May 1972
- Venue: Wembley Stadium, London
- Referee: David Smith (Stonehouse)
- Attendance: 100,000

The 1972 FA Cup final took place on 6 May 1972 at Wembley Stadium. It was the centenary final (although only the 91st final due to the world wars) and the 44th to be played at Wembley.

It was contested between cup holders Arsenal, who had won the Football League and the FA Cup the previous season, and Leeds United, who had won the Inter-Cities Fairs Cup and finished second in the league the previous season, but had never won the FA Cup. Arsenal and Leeds became the first clubs to have faced one another in both English domestic cup finals: the two had previously contested the 1968 Football League Cup Final, which Leeds had won, 1–0. Arsenal planned to make it the third successive decade for a club to return as Cup-holders and win for a second successive year, as Newcastle United had done in 1952 and Tottenham Hotspur in 1962.

This final is the origin of the song "Leeds! Leeds! Leeds!" (commonly known as "Marching On Together"), which was the B-side of Leeds's Cup Final record. The song is still played by United and other Leeds sports teams.

To date, this remains Leeds's last victory in a competitive final of any type (not counting the 1992 FA Charity Shield), with their subsequent appearances in the 1973 FA Cup final, 1973 European Cup Winners' Cup final, 1975 European Cup final, 1996 Football League Cup final, and play-off final appearances in 1987, 2006, 2008 and 2024 all ending in defeat. Allan Clarke's winning goal likewise remains the last one scored by any Leeds player in a competitive final (not counting the 1987 play-off final, which took place across two legs and a replay).

== Road to Wembley ==
=== Leeds United ===
Home teams listed first.

Round 3: Leeds United 4–1 Bristol Rovers

Round 4: Liverpool 0–0 Leeds United

Replay: Leeds United 2–0 Liverpool

Round 5: Cardiff City 0–2 Leeds United

Round 6: Leeds United 2–1 Tottenham Hotspur

Semi-final: Leeds United 3–0 Birmingham City

(at Hillsborough Stadium, Sheffield)

=== Arsenal ===
Home teams listed first.

Round 3: Swindon Town 0–2 Arsenal

Round 4: Reading 1 –2 Arsenal

Round 5: Derby County 2–2 Arsenal

Replay: Arsenal 0–0 Derby County
2nd Replay: Arsenal 1–0 Derby County (at Filbert Street)

Round 6: Leyton Orient 0–1 Arsenal

Semi-final: Stoke City 1–1 Arsenal

(at Villa Park, Birmingham)
Replay: Arsenal 2–1 Stoke City

(at Goodison Park, Everton)

== Match summary ==
The Leeds duo Mick Jones and Allan 'Sniffer' Clarke combined to produce a goal in the fifty-third minute. Jones sent across a hard, shoulder-high centre and Clarke headed powerfully past Arsenal keeper Geoff Barnett's left hand from fifteen yards.

A match that often fell below the highest level began badly with a foul by Clarke on Alan Ball in the first five seconds and the first of four bookings – Bob McNab bringing down Peter Lorimer as early as the second minute. Neither side played consistently up to their capabilities, yet both had their moments. Charlie George's fierce volley cannoned back off the bar for Arsenal, and both Clarke and Lorimer struck the woodwork for Leeds.

Leeds' jubilation at the end was tempered by a last-minute injury to Mick Jones, who dislocated his elbow and had to be helped up the steps by Norman Hunter to receive his winners' medal.

== Match facts ==
6 May 1972
15:00 BST

Leeds United	1–0	Arsenal
Clarke 53'	(Report)

Wembley, London
Attendance: 100,000
Referee: David Smith

Leeds United	Arsenal

GK	1	(Scotland) David Harvey
RB	2	(England) Paul Reaney
LB	3	(England) Paul Madeley
MF	4	(Scotland) Billy Bremner (c)
CB	5	(England) Jack Charlton
CB	6	(England) Norman Hunter
RW	7	(Scotland) Peter Lorimer
FW	8	(England) Allan Clarke
FW	9	(England) Mick Jones
MF	10	(Republic of Ireland) Johnny Giles
LW	11	(Scotland) Eddie Gray
Substitute:
MF	12	(England) Mick Bates
Manager:
(England) Don Revie

GK	1	(England) Geoff Barnett
RB	2	(Northern Ireland) Pat Rice
LB	3	(England) Bob McNab
MF	4	(England) Peter Storey
CB	5	(Scotland) Frank McLintock (c)
CB	6	(England) Peter Simpson
MF	7	(England) George Armstrong
MF	8	(England) Alan Ball
FW	9	(England) Charlie George
FW	10	(England) John Radford (substituted off) 73'
MF	11	(Scotland) George Graham
Substitute:
FW	12	(England) Ray Kennedy (substituted in) 73'
Manager:
(England) Bertie Mee

Match rules

- 90 minutes.
- 30 minutes of extra-time if necessary.
- Replay if scores still level.
- One named substitute.
