= Bob McNab =

English footballer (born 1943)

Personal information
- Full name: Robert McNab
- Date of birth: 20 July 1943 (age 83)
- Place of birth: Huddersfield, England
- Height: 5 ft 7 1/2 in (1.71 m)
- Position: Left-back

Senior career*
Years	Team	Apps	(Gls)
1963–1966	Huddersfield Town	68	(0)
1966–1975	Arsenal	278	(4)
1975–1976	Wolverhampton Wanderers	13	(0)
1976	San Antonio Thunder	12	(1)
1976–1977	Barnet	16	(1)
1979	Vancouver Whitecaps	2	(0)
1983–1984	Tacoma Stars (indoor)	1	(0)
Total		390	(6)

International career
1968–1969	England	4	(0)

Managerial career
- 1980: Vancouver Whitecaps
- 1983: Tacoma Stars
- 1983–1985: Tacoma Stars (assistant)
- 1985–1986: Tacoma Stars
- 1994–1995: San Jose Grizzlies (indoor)
- 1999–2000: Portsmouth (caretaker)
- * Club domestic league appearances and goals

Robert McNab (born 20 July 1943) is an English former footballer who played as a defender. McNab featured for clubs Huddersfield Town, Arsenal, Wolverhampton Wanderers, San Antonio Thunder, Barnet, Vancouver Whitecaps and Tacoma Stars in his playing career. He also played for England's national football team.

As a manager he was at the helm of Vancouver Whitecaps, Tacoma Stars, San Jose Grizzlies and Portsmouth.

== Club career ==
Born in Huddersfield, Yorkshire, McNab started out at local club, Huddersfield Town, where he made close to seventy appearances. In October 1966 he was signed by Bertie Mee for Arsenal for £50,000.

He made his debut for the club in a defeat to Leeds United on 15 October 1966. McNab went on to become a regular and to play in the 1969 Football League Cup Final which Arsenal lost to Swindon Town.

With Arsenal he won the 1969–70 Inter-Cities Fairs Cup. In the back line alongside Pat Rice and Frank McLintock, McNab played 62 matches in Arsenal's Double-winning season, missing just two games, and winning a League and FA Cup Double in 1970–71.

He missed much of the 1971–72 season due to injury, with Sammy Nelson deputising for him, though he was able to play at Wembley in the 1972 FA Cup Final which Arsenal lost to Leeds United.

McNab returned to full fitness, playing over 50 matches the following season. However, in 1973–74 he suffered another curtailing injury and again had to share the role of left back. With the younger Nelson being in favour, the 32-year-old McNab left the club on a free transfer in the summer of 1975. In total he played 365 matches for Arsenal, scoring six goals.

After leaving Arsenal, he at first played for Wolverhampton Wanderers before linking up in the U.S. with the NASL's San Antonio Thunder. He then returned to England to join up Barnet, only to move back across the Atlantic to Canada where he played for the NASL's Vancouver Whitecaps, where he brought his playing days to a close.

McNab went on to coach the Whitecaps and thereafter the Tacoma Stars of the Major Indoor Soccer League. He left being at the helm of the Stars in December 1983 only to become the club's assistant manager. During the 1983–84 season, whilst in the aforesaid role he also played a solo game for the Stars. He was reappointed as the side's manager in March 1985.

McNab later emigrated to Los Angeles, California, where he presently lives and works as a property developer. In 1999, he was part of a consortium led by Milan Mandaric that took over Portsmouth. He was for an instance a caretaker manager of the side until the appointment of Tony Pulis within the following month.

== International career ==
McNab made his debut for England on 6 November 1968 against Romania. He made a sum total of four appearances for England. These caps came in home and away draws to Romania as well as a 3–1 win over Northern Ireland in Belfast and a 1–1 draw at Wembley against Bulgaria.

== Personal life ==
As well as being a footballer, Bob McNab was a media personality in the 1970s, appearing on the panel for ITV's coverage of the 1970 FIFA World Cup, and he had a cameo role in the 1973 On The Buses episode "The Football Match". His daughter Mercedes McNab is a retired actress known for her recurring role as Harmony Kendall on the American television series Buffy the Vampire Slayer and its spinoff series, Angel.

McNab was injured for the majority of the 1971–72 season and was thus doubtful for the FA Cup semi final played at the neutral venue of Villa Park against Stoke City. This scenario was referenced in the film Fever Pitch, where Paul Ashworth correctly predicts part of the game's lineup with the line, "McNab won't play. Bertie Mee wouldn't risk him."

== Honours ==
Arsenal

- Football League First Division: 1970–71
- FA Cup: 1970–71; runner-up: 1971–72
- Inter-Cities Fairs Cup: 1969–70
- Football League Cup runner-up: 1967–68, 1968–69
