= Billy Milne =

Scottish footballer

Bill Milne
Personal information
- Full name: William Milne
- Date of birth: 24 November 1895
- Place of birth: Buckie, Banffshire, Scotland
- Date of death: July 1975 (aged 79)
- Height: 5 ft 7 in (1.70 m)
- Position: Wing half

Senior career*
Years	Team	Apps	(Gls)
- Buckie Thistle
1921–1927	Arsenal	114	(1)
- * Club domestic league appearances and goals

William Milne DCM, also known locally as 'Stir', (24 November 1895 – July 1975), was a Scottish footballer who played for Arsenal, before becoming a long-standing member of the club's backroom staff.

Born in Buckie, Banffshire, Milne started his career at his hometown club, Buckie Thistle in the Scottish Highland Football League, although his career was interrupted early on by World War I. During the war, Milne served with the Seaforth Highlanders in France and won the Distinguished Conduct Medal in 1918. After hostilities ceased, Milne returned to Buckie, and to Buckie Thistle, where he made a name for himself as a tireless and enthusiastic wing half (what would today be approximately a midfield position).

In September 1921 he made the long journey south by train (Great North of Scotland Railway) from Buckie to join London side Arsenal. Milne made his debut for Arsenal away to Cardiff City on 27 December 1921, but only played another four games that season. However, the following season he became an established regular in the Arsenal side, as a right half, and continued to play there for another four seasons. However, after the arrival of Alf Baker he was dropped; he was a bit-part player for the next few seasons, but in a match against Huddersfield Town on 2 April 1927 he broke his leg and his playing career was effectively finished. In all he played 124 times for Arsenal, scoring three goals.

Milne's tenaciousness and high levels of fitness led Arsenal manager Herbert Chapman to retain Milne's services, appointing him as assistant trainer to Tom Whittaker. During World War II he was stationed as an ARP warden at Highbury and was present the night the stadium was bombed with incendiary devices; Milne helped put out the resulting fire and saved the stadium from even more serious damage.

Milne continued to hold the assistant trainer's position until Whittaker himself became Arsenal manager in 1947, upon which Milne became first-team trainer, and later club physiotherapist; he also served the England team in a similar capacity. He fully retired in 1960 and was succeeded by Bertie Mee, who would later become Arsenal's Double-winning manager. He died in 1975, at the age of 79.
