= Richie Powling =

English footballer (born 1956)

Personal information
- Date of birth: 21 May 1956 (age 70)
- Place of birth: Barking, England
- Position: Defender

Youth career
- 1971–1973: Arsenal

Senior career*
Years	Team	Apps	(Gls)
1973–1981	Arsenal	55	(3)
- Barnet
- Grays Athletic

International career
1973–1974	England youth	3	(0)

Managerial career
- 1984–19??: Tiptree United
- Harwich & Parkeston
- 1992–1997: Sudbury Town
- 1999: Braintree Town
- 2002–2003: Clacton Town
- * Club domestic league appearances and goals

Richie Powling (born 21 May 1956) is an English former professional footballer who played as a defender and who later became a manager.

== Playing career ==
Born in Barking, Powling began his career at Arsenal, signing on apprentice terms in September 1971. A regular for the club's reserve teams while still just fifteen, he turned professional in July 1973. He made his first-team debut in a 2–0 defeat to Queens Park Rangers on 27 October 1973, but only played twice more that season. He went on to win three England youth caps during the 1973–74 season.

A bit-part player during 1973–74, he made only eleven appearances during the 1974–75 season. Powling then established himself in the first team in November 1975, remaining in the team remainder of the 1975–76 season, during which he scored his first goal in a 1–1 draw at Coventry City and played a total of 33 matches. However, following the arrival of new manager Terry Neill, defenders Pat Howard and Willie Young, as well as a spate of injuries, Powling lost his regular place in the team, playing just 11 times in 1976–77 season.

After appearing against Nottingham Forest in September 1977, he suffered an ankle injury, then knee damage, causing him to miss the rest of the 1977–78 and 1978–79 seasons. He made a comeback in the reserves at the end of 1979–80 but never fully recovered and did not play for the first team again. In total he played 59 times for Arsenal, scoring three goals. He then left the club in 1981 to play for non-League clubs Barnet and Grays Athletic before retiring.

== Managerial career ==
Powling began his management career at Tiptree United in 1984, before moving to Harwich & Parkeston. Between 1992 and 1997 he managed Sudbury Town, leading them to their greatest period of success; during his time as manager Sudbury were promoted to the Premier Division of the Southern League and reached the FA Cup second round for the first (and only) time in their history.

After leaving Sudbury he took over as manager of Braintree Town in April 1999, but was sacked in December that year. After returning to Harwich on the coaching staff in 2000, he joined Clacton Town in 2002, and became the club's Director of Football in 2003.
