= Willie Ross (footballer, born 1919) =

Scottish footballer

Personal information
- Date of birth: 2 May 1919
- Place of birth: Glasgow, Scotland
- Date of death: 1990 (aged 70–71)
- Position: Centre forward

Senior career*
Years	Team	Apps	(Gls)
- Yoker Athletic
1948–1950	Arbroath	55	(26)
1950–1951	Bradford City	4	(2)
- Portadown
Total		59	(28)
- * Club domestic league appearances and goals

Willie Ross (2 May 1919 – 1990) was a Scottish professional footballer who played as a centre forward.

== Career ==
Born in Glasgow, Ross played for Yoker Athletic, Arbroath, Bradford City and Portadown.

His son Trevor was a professional footballer, playing for Arsenal and Everton.
