= Brian Hornsby =

English footballer (born 1954)

Personal information
- Full name: Brian Geoffrey Hornsby
- Date of birth: 10 September 1954 (age 72)
- Place of birth: Great Shelford, England
- Height: 5 ft 8 in (1.73 m)
- Position: Midfielder

Youth career
- –1970: Peterborough Boys
- 1970–1972: Arsenal

Senior career*
Years	Team	Apps	(Gls)
1972–1976	Arsenal	26	(6)
1976–1978	Shrewsbury Town	75	(16)
1978–1982	Sheffield Wednesday	106	(25)
1981–1982	→ Chester City (loan)	4	(0)
1982	Edmonton Drillers	16	(2)
1982–1984	Carlisle United	10	(1)
1983–1984	→ Chesterfield (loan)	1	(0)
1984–1985	IK Brage	20	(1)
1986–1988	Falu BS		
- Spalding United
- Holbeach United

International career
1970	England Schoolboys	8	(6)
1973	England Youth	7	(3)

Managerial career
- Falu BS
- * Club domestic league appearances and goals

Brian Hornsby (born 10 September 1954) is an English former professional footballer who played as a midfielder for Arsenal, Shrewsbury Town, Sheffield Wednesday and Carlisle United in the English league. He also had short spells playing abroad for Edmonton Drillers (Canada), IK Brage (Sweden) and Falu BS (Sweden) for whom he was player-manager. Hornsby played 222 English league games and scoring 48 goals. His career was seriously curtailed by a hamstring injury when playing for Sheffield Wednesday in 1980.

== Playing career ==
As a schoolboy Hornsby captained Peterborough Boys and earned England caps at School boy and Youth level.

=== Arsenal ===
Hornsby joined Arsenal straight from school in 1970, he was member of the Arsenal team which won the FA Youth Cup in 1971, beating Cardiff City 2–0 over two legs. He signed as a professional for Arsenal in September 1971. Arsenal had just won The Double in the 1970–71 season and had a very strong team. Hornsby's chances of breaking into the first team were very rare and he did not make his debut until May 1973 in the final league game of the 1972–73 season in a 6–1 defeat at Leeds United. He was very much a reserve and squad player for the Gunners making 26 league appearances in his almost five seasons at Highbury, scoring six goals. Hornsby was released by Arsenal at the end of Bertie Mee's reign as manager and he signed for Shrewsbury Town in May 1976 for £40,000.

=== Shrewsbury Town ===
Hornsby while playing under Shrewsbury boss Alan Durban and was virtually ever present during his almost two years at Gay Meadow playing in 75 league games and scoring 16 goals. He helped Town win the Welsh Cup in 1977. In February 1978 Durban left to be manager of Stoke City and the following month Hornsby signed for Sheffield Wednesday in a £45,000 deal.

=== Sheffield Wednesday ===
Sheffield Wednesday manager Jack Charlton had been tracking Hornsby for some time and he finally got his man. There is a famous anecdote regarding Hornsby which sums up Charlton's laconic personality. Wednesday were playing Shrewsbury away at the end of February 1978, just before Hornsby's move to Sheffield. Charlton was giving his pre-match team talk and midway through turned to Wednesday midfielder Jeff Johnson and said, "You're up against the lad Hornsby, he's a very skilful player ... I'm buying him to replace you". As it happened there was room for both Hornsby and Johnson in the Wednesday team.

Hornsby made his debut for Wednesday on 18 March 1978 in a 3–1 away defeat to Lincoln City, however after that Wednesday only suffered one more defeat in the remaining 12 matches that season. On signing, Hornsby had said on local radio that he would score plenty of goals from midfield, his first came on 25 March in a 2–0 away win at Rotherham. It was a 25-yard volley into the roof of the net which was named as Goal of the Season on Yorkshire Television by Martin Tyler. Jeff Johnson scored the other goal that day.

The 1978–79 season saw Hornsby finish as top scorer for Wednesday with 21 goals in all competitions including three in the FA Cup 3rd round marathon against former club Arsenal. 1979–80 saw Wednesday promoted from Division Three but Hornsby's goal contribution was only three, missing a third of the matches through injury. The following season (1980–81) in Division Two started well for Hornsby scoring three goals in 12 matches, however in October 1980 he suffered a troublesome hamstring problem and missed the rest of the season. Hornsby made one more appearance for Wednesday, as a substitute at Chelsea in December 1981. A few weeks earlier he had made four appearances for Chester City on loan.

=== Latter career ===
Hornsby spent part of 1982 playing for the Canadian NASL team Edmonton Drillers but returned to England after they hit financial trouble and folded. He signed for Carlisle United in the summer of 1982 and spent two years there, making ten appearances and scoring one goal against Newcastle United, described as "a brilliant chip over Kevin Carr" by one football writer. in November 1982. After a brief spell on loan at Chesterfield, Hornsby moved to Sweden in 1984 to play for IK Brage for a season, making 20 appearances and scoring 1 goal. He then moved to the town of Falun to be player-manager of Falu BS (Bollsällskap). On returning to the UK he played non-League football for Spalding United and Holbeach United.

== After football ==
Hornsby later lived in Peterborough. For more than 15 years he has been captain of the Arsenal F.C. former professionals and celebrity team raising money for charities and the Arsenal Trust. He is also involved with the charity Action Medical Research and along with friend Tony Hadley undertook a trek to Machu Picchu to raise funds for the charity.

== Honours ==
Arsenal

- FA Youth Cup: 1971

Shrewsbury Town

- Welsh Cup: 1977

Sheffield Wednesday

- Football League Third Division: 1980

Individual

- Football League Third Division PFA Team of the Year: 1979
