= Terry Mancini =

English footballer (born 1942)

Personal information
- Full name: Terence John Mancini
- Date of birth: 4 October 1942 (age 84)
- Place of birth: Camden Town, London, England
- Position: Centre half

Senior career*
Years	Team	Apps	(Gls)
1961–1966	Watford	67	(0)
1966–1967	Port Elizabeth City	48	(1)
1967–1971	Leyton Orient	167	(16)
1971–1974	Queens Park Rangers	94	(3)
1974–1976	Arsenal	52	(1)
1976–1977	Aldershot	21	(0)
1977	Los Angeles Aztecs	26	(3)
1978	Barnet	6	(0)
Total		481	(24)

International career
1973–1974	Republic of Ireland	5	(1)
- * Club domestic league appearances and goals

Terence John Mancini (born 4 October 1942) is a former professional footballer who played as a centre-half. Born in England, he earned five international caps for the Republic of Ireland national team.

== Playing career ==
Mancini was born in London, and was originally named Terry Seely. His father (who was Irish) died when Terry was seven, and his mother remarried, changing his surname to that of his stepfather. He began his career with Watford, joining the club in 1960 before being released midway through the 1965–66 season. After a 20-month spell in South Africa playing for Port Elizabeth City, he returned to London in November 1967 to join Leyton Orient. He spent four seasons with Orient, winning a Third Division medal in 1969–70.

In October 1971, he signed for Queens Park Rangers, and helped them to promotion to the First Division in 1972–73. Born and brought up in England, after a chance conversation with QPR teammate Don Givens, Mancini found out that through his Irish father, he could play for the Republic of Ireland. He won his first cap against Poland in 1973 and went on to win five in total. Mancini later reported that when he first appeared for the Republic of Ireland, he did not realize that the band was playing the Republic's national anthem, having never heard the tune before. Memorably for him, Mancini's one international goal came at the Maracana in a friendly against Brazil ahead of the 1974 FIFA World Cup. He was sent off on his last appearance, a 3–0 win in Dalymount Park over the Soviet Union on 30 October 1974: Mancini received a straight red card for punching Volodymyr Kaplichny ("[I] took half his nose off") in retaliation for persistent kidney punches.

Mancini signed for Arsenal in October 1974 for £20,000. Having made his debut against West Ham United on 26 October 1974, he played for Arsenal for two seasons, recording 62 appearances. However, after Arsenal's worst performance in over forty years in the league (17th) in 1975–76, Arsenal manager Bertie Mee resigned. Mancini was deemed surplus to requirements (being nearly 34) by Mee's replacement Terry Neill, and he was released on a free transfer in September 1976. He joined Aldershot and played a single season with them. He ended his career in the NASL, playing one summer with the Los Angeles Aztecs before returning to England

== Non-playing career ==
As well as playing, during the early 1970s, Mancini was an occasional presenter of London Weekend Television's The Big Match, when the programme, in an attempt to distance itself from the more staid Match of the Day, experimented with using current players as presenters.

On 6 November 1974, he judged the 'Children's Photograph Competition' in London with Kenneth Williams, and others. Williams' diary entry for that day includes: " When he (Mancini) left, he said to me ' I could stay here all night taking to you...I'd like to meet you again...this could go on forever as far as I'm concerned'. I was pleased and flattered and touched. More than I've been for years":('K.Williams' Diaries':HarperCollins:1993).

After retiring from the game in 1977, Mancini coached several teams before eventually leaving football altogether and running a variety of businesses.

== International ==
Republic of Ireland
Year	Apps	Goals
1973	1	0
1974	4	1
Total	5	1

== Honours ==
Leyton Orient

- Football League Third Division: 1969–70

== See also ==
- List of Republic of Ireland international footballers born outside the Republic of Ireland
