= Eddie Kelly (footballer) =

Scottish footballer (born 1951)

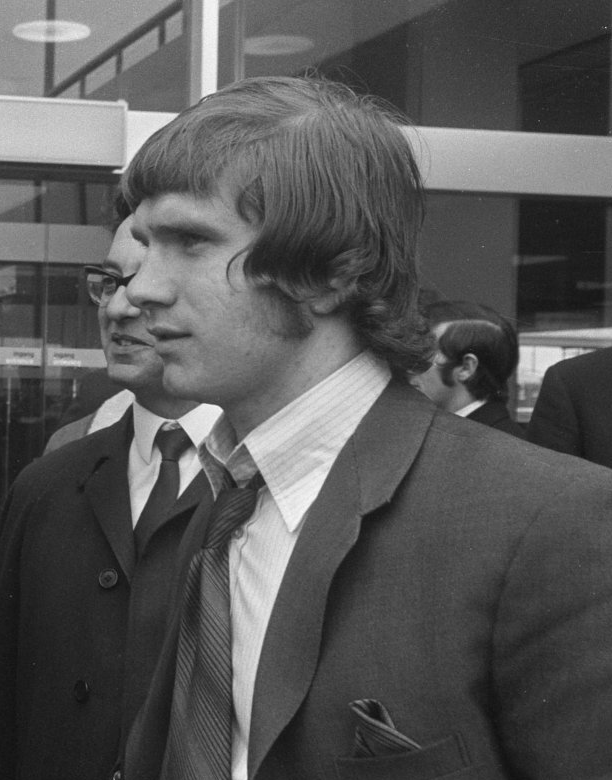
- Eddie Kelly, April 1970

Personal information
- Full name: Edward Patrick Kelly
- Date of birth: 7 February 1951 (age 75)
- Place of birth: Glasgow, Scotland
- Position: Midfielder

Youth career
- Possil YM

Senior career*
Years	Team	Apps	(Gls)
1969–1976	Arsenal	175	(13)
1976–1977	Queens Park Rangers	28	(1)
1977–1980	Leicester City	85	(3)
1980–1981	Notts County	27	(1)
1981	AFC Bournemouth	13	(0)
1981–1983	Leicester City	34	(0)
1983–1984	Kettering Town	1	(0)
1984–1986	Torquay United	35	(1)
Total		397	(19)

International career
1971–1974	Scotland U23	3	(0)
- * Club domestic league appearances and goals

Edward Patrick Kelly (born 7 February 1951) is a Scottish former footballer, who played as a midfielder. Kelly featured for clubs Arsenal, Queens Park Rangers, Leicester City, Notts County, AFC Bournemouth, Kettering Town and Torquay United.

== Club career ==
Kelly was born in Glasgow and played for local side Possil YM, an Arsenal nursery side, before moving south to join English club Arsenal as an apprentice in July 1966; he turned professional 18 months later. A regular in the reserves and for Scotland U-23 side, he made his debut for Arsenal on 6 September 1969 against Sheffield Wednesday and quickly made a name for himself. He made 16 appearances in the 1969–70 season, including scoring a goal in the Gunners' 4–3 aggregate win over Anderlecht in the Inter-Cities Fairs Cup final.

Better was to come the next season for the young central midfielder. Kelly made 34 appearances as Arsenal won the Double; he came on as a substitute in the FA Cup final against Liverpool, and scored the Gunners' equaliser in extra time in a goalmouth scramble. George Graham made a claim for the goal, but the replays show Kelly was the last Arsenal player to touch the ball. Kelly was thus the first substitute to score in an FA Cup final. Charlie George scored soon after to win the match 2–1.

Injury hampered Kelly's next two seasons at Arsenal, but he became a near-ever present in 1974–75. He was made club captain at the age of 23; only Tony Adams has captained Arsenal at a younger age. However, Kelly lost his place the following season and became quite unsettled. After making a transfer request, he joined Queens Park Rangers in September 1976, having played 222 times and scoring nine goals altogether for Arsenal.

Kelly spent only a single season at QPR before being signed for Leicester City by former Arsenal and QPR teammate Frank McLintock in the summer of 1977. He spent three seasons at Filbert Street, playing 119 times and scoring 3 goals. Leicester were relegated to the Second Division in 1978 but then returned to the top flight as champions the following year. He went on to have short spells at Notts County, AFC Bournemouth and Torquay United, before retiring.

== International career ==
Kelly featured for Scotland's Under 19 and Under 23 teams.

== Honours ==
Arsenal

- Football League First Division: 1970–71
- FA Cup: 1970–71
- Inter-Cities Fairs Cup: 1969–70

Leicester City

- Football League Second Division: 1980–81
