= John Radford (footballer) =

English footballer

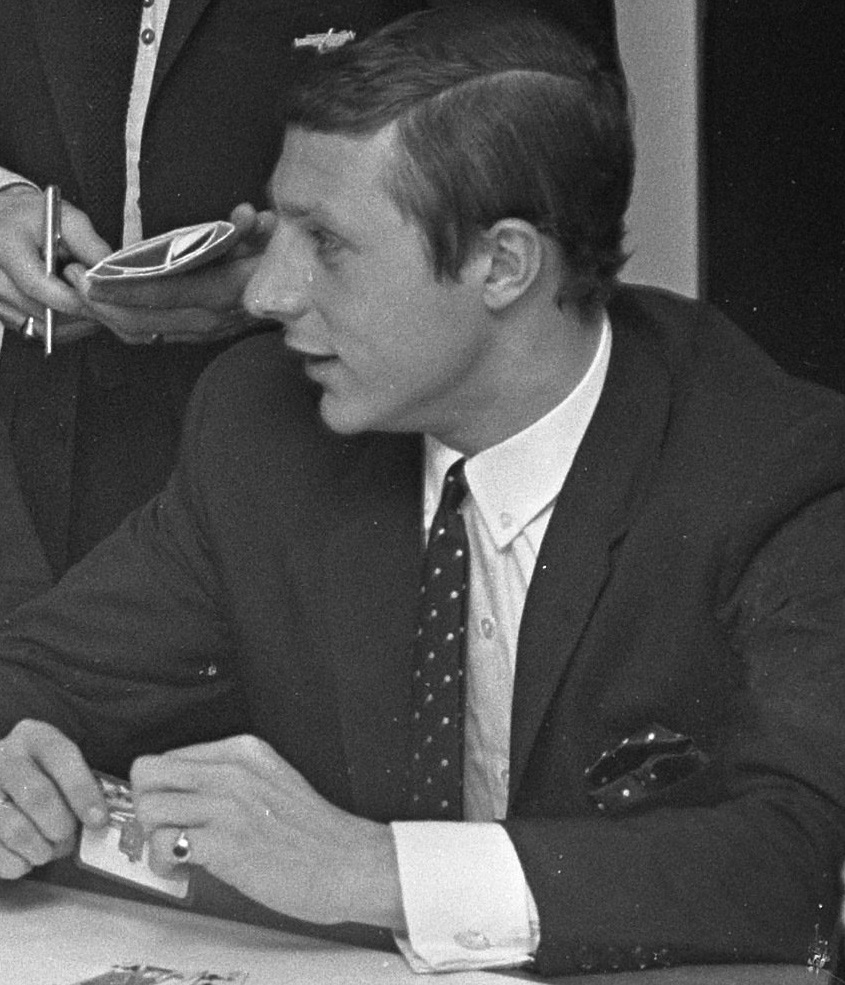

Personal information
- Date of birth: 22 February 1947 (age 79)
- Place of birth: Hemsworth, Yorkshire, England
- Positions: Centre forward; right winger

Youth career
- 1962–1964: Arsenal

Senior career*
Years	Team	Apps	(Gls)
1964–1976	Arsenal	379	(111)
1976–1977	West Ham United	28	(0)
1977–1979	Blackburn Rovers	38	(10)
1979–1983	Bishop's Stortford		
Total		445	(121)

International career
1969–1971	England	2	(0)

Managerial career
- 1987–1989: Bishop's Stortford
- 1991–????: Bishop's Stortford
- * Club domestic league appearances and goals

John Radford (born 22 February 1947) is an English former footballer who played for Arsenal, West Ham United and Blackburn Rovers throughout his career. Radford, who played as a forward, is Arsenal's fourth highest goal scorer of all time.

== Club career ==
=== Arsenal ===
John Radford was born in Hemsworth, Yorkshire to a butcher. He joined Arsenal as an apprentice in 1962, turning professional in February 1964. At the club he played mostly as an inside forward or centre forward and occasionally as a right-winger.

He was a prolific goalscorer in the youth and reserve teams, before making his first-team debut against West Ham United on 21 March 1964, his only appearance of the 1963-64 season. Radford was used slightly more the next season, playing 15 times, and became Arsenal's youngest ever hat-trick scorer, against Wolves on 2 January 1965, at the age of 17 years and 315 days, a record that remains to this day.

By the start of 1965-66 Radford was an Arsenal regular, and particularly blossomed under the stewardship of Bertie Mee. Although he had been moved out to the right wing, in the 1968-69 season he scored nineteen goals and reached the League Cup final. During the 1969-70 season he again scored nineteen goals, and helped Arsenal win the 1970 Inter-Cities Fairs Cup which was their first trophy in seventeen years. Radford scored the second goal in Arsenal's 3–0 win in the second leg of the final, which they won 4–3 on aggregate.

By now, Radford had been moved up front again and continued to score regularly. The following 1970-71 season Radford scored 21, his best single tally in a season, forming a partnership with Ray Kennedy that between them recorded 47 goals. With his goals, Radford was an instrumental part of Arsenal's FA Cup and League Championship double-winning side. His assists played an important role too as he set up Kennedy for the winning goal in Arsenal's FA Cup semi-final replay win against Stoke City, and set up both Eddie Kelly and Charlie George for their goals in the Final against Liverpool. The following season Arsenal again faced Stoke in the FA Cup semi-final. Bob Wilson had to go off injured and Radford went in goal. He helped Arsenal secure a 1–1 draw and then in the replay he scored the winning goal as Arsenal again got to the final, though this time they lost to Leeds United.

He continued to play for Arsenal through the early 1970s, scoring another 19 goals in 1972-73. However, his goal rate gradually reduced (only achieving single figures in 1973-74 and 1974-75) and he was injured in 1975-76, further restricting his appearances. By now, the partnership of Malcolm Macdonald and Frank Stapleton had become Arsenal's first-choice attacking duo and Radford only played twice in the first four months of 1976-77. In all he played 481 times for Arsenal, scoring 149 goals, which makes him Arsenal's fourth all-time top scorer.

=== Later career ===
Unable to stake a place in the side, Radford moved on to West Ham United in December 1976 for £80,000.

After a year and 28 league appearances and no goals with the Hammers, Radford joined Blackburn Rovers in 1977. He was moderately successful with the Second Division side, scoring ten times in 38 league appearances. He left Rovers in 1978 and then played for non-league side Bishop's Stortford, winning the Isthmian League and an FA Trophy with the club. After retiring, he enjoyed several spells as manager of Bishop's Stortford in the late 1980s and early 1990s. Radford worked as a youth coach with Queens Park Rangers as well. He now also gives tours of Arsenal's Emirates Stadium and appears as a football pundit on their TV station: Arsenal TV.

== International career ==
Radford as an England youth international, won four caps for the under-23 side. He made his full debut for the Three Lions in a friendly against Romania on 15 January 1969. However, he was not a favourite of England manager Sir Alf Ramsey and won only one further cap, against Switzerland on 13 October 1971; Radford scored in neither match.

== Personal life ==
Radford has been married to wife Engel since 1968. Engel, of the Netherlands and John have two sons, Ian and Robert. He became a landlord, running the Greyhound pub in Thaxted, Essex.

In 1997, Radford became a grandfather (through Ian) for the first time to a boy named Brandon. In 2001, a granddaughter was born (also by Ian) named Jovi-Lee.

== Honours ==
=== Player ===
Arsenal

- Football League First Division: 1970–71
- FA Cup: 1970–71; runner-up: 1971–72
- Inter-Cities Fairs Cup: 1969–70
- Football League Cup runner-up: 1967–68, 1968–69

Bishop's Storford

- Isthmian League: 1980–81
- FA Trophy: 1980–81

Individual

- Arsenal Player of the Season: 1967–68, 1972–73

=== Manager ===
Bishop's Stortford

- Isthmian League Cup: 1989
