= Charlie George =

English footballer (born 1950)

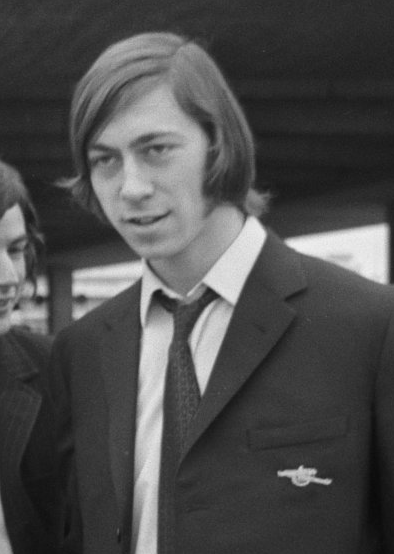
- George in 1970

Personal information
- Full name: Frederick Charles George
- Date of birth: 10 October 1950 (age 76)
- Place of birth: Islington, London, England
- Height: 5 ft 11 in (1.80 m)
- Positions: Forward; attacking midfielder

Youth career
- 1966–1968: Arsenal

Senior career*
Years	Team	Apps	(Gls)
1968–1975	Arsenal	133	(31)
1975–1978	Derby County	106	(34)
1977	→ St George Budapest (loan)	6	(1)
1978	Minnesota Kicks	18	(9)
1978–1981	Southampton	44	(11)
1980	→ Nottingham Forest (loan)	2	(0)
1981–1982	Bulova	7	(0)
1982	AFC Bournemouth	2	(0)
1982	Derby County	11	(2)
1982	Bulova	?	(?)
1982	Dundee United	0	(0)
1983	Coventry City	0	(0)
Total		322	(88)

International career
1972–1973	England U23	5	(1)
1976	England	1	(0)
- * Club domestic league appearances and goals

Frederick Charles George (born 10 October 1950) is an English former professional footballer who played as a forward.

George began his career as a youngster with Arsenal and was part of their 1970–71 League and FA Cup Double-winning team, scoring the winning goal in the FA Cup Final. In 1975, he left Arsenal to join up with Derby County. After playing for US club Minnesota Kicks, in 1978 George joined Southampton, where he spent another three seasons. Whilst there he had a brief spell on loan with Nottingham Forest with whom he won the 1979 European Super Cup. He then had a spell with Hong Kong side Bulova before he returned to England for short stints with AFC Bournemouth and Derby County. George was capped once for the England national team.

== Club career ==
=== Arsenal ===
Born in Islington, London, George attended the local Grafton, Holloway Road and Hugh Myddleton Schools. George supported Arsenal as a boy and played for Islington Schoolboys before joining Arsenal in May 1966.

He turned professional in 1968 and made his first-team debut on 9 August 1969 against Everton, on the first day of the 1969–70 season; Arsenal lost the match 1–0. George became a regular in the side that season making a total of 39 appearances. He was particularly prolific in Arsenal's 1969–70 Inter-Cities Fairs Cup campaign, including against Dinamo Bacau and Ajax. He played in both legs of the final against RSC Anderlecht, which Arsenal won 4–3 on aggregate.

George broke his ankle at the start of the following season in a collision with Everton goalkeeper Gordon West. After being out for five months he returned to play a significant part in Arsenal's run-in to the 1970–71 Division One title, scoring five times in 17 appearances in the League. However, the highlight of his season came in the FA Cup; he scored in the fourth, fifth and sixth rounds as well as proving the difference in the final against Liverpool. With the score at 1–1 in extra time, in the 111th minute George latched onto John Radford's square ball and scored a spectacular winner from 20 yards to win the match. He celebrated by lying flat on his back with arms aloft. With that Cup win, Arsenal completed their first Double win.

George was prolific in the Gunners' FA Cup run in the 1971–72 season, scoring the equalising goal in the Cup semi-final against Stoke City which Arsenal won by a 2–1 margin at Goodison Park. In the Cup Final at Wembley, Arsenal lost to Leeds United.

The latter stages of George's career with Arsenal were hampered by injuries and a rebellious streak at odds with the club's management; during the 1971–72 season he was disciplined by the club twice, first after headbutting Liverpool's Kevin Keegan, and then for flicking a V-sign at Derby County's fans after scoring away at the Baseball Ground.

As the Double-winning side were gradually broken up, Arsenal began to descend down the table, and although George hit eleven goals in both 1971–72 and 1972–73 his form declined alongside Arsenal's; he only scored five times in 28 matches in 1973–74 and he was dropped from the first team in 1974–75 after falling out with manager Bertie Mee. By Christmas 1974, he had been transfer-listed, and he moved to Derby County in July 1975 for £100,000. In total he played 179 times for Arsenal and scored 49 goals. George was ranked at No. 9 in a feature of Arsenal's greatest 50 players of all time.

=== Derby County ===
George played his first game for Derby County in the Charity Shield of 1975 which they won by a 2-0 margin over West Ham. He spent three and a half years at Derby, where he memorably scored a hat-trick against Real Madrid in a European Cup first leg of October 1975. Derby eventually lost the cup tie by a margin of 6–5 on aggregate in all. He later scored a hat-trick for Derby against Finn Harps in the first leg of a UEFA Cup tie in September 1976. Derby eventually altogether scored 12 goals in this match of European competition, becoming the first British club to ever do so. In June and July 1977 He also had a loan spell at St George Budapest in Australia where he played six matches in the first edition of the National Soccer League. George, whose exploits with the Rams earned him the chant "Charlie, Charlie, the King of Derby", remains a legendary and beloved figure among many of the fans of Derby County.

=== Later career ===
After Derby, he went on to play for the Minnesota Kicks in the North American Soccer League. At the Kicks, George scored what was an NASL record for the fastest playoff goal in a 9–2 thumping of the New York Cosmos. In all he made 18 appearances while scoring 9 goals in the 1978 season for the club. George then returned to England with Southampton in December 1978. He then had a short period on loan to Nottingham Forest in January 1980, where he played four games. One of these included the final of the 1979 UEFA Super Cup against FC Barcelona, where he scored the only goal in the home leg as Forest won 2–1 on aggregate. George could not agree an extension to his loan at Forest and later returned to Southampton, playing his last league game for them on 14 March 1981 against Stoke City. In the summer of 1981 he left the club to move to Bulova in Hong Kong. He made a total of 52 appearances for Southampton in which he scored 14 goals.

A year later, in 1982, he returned to England to have a short time at AFC Bournemouth and subsequently rejoined Derby County for a second spell. He also had a brief spell later with Scottish side Dundee United. He then linked up with Coventry City on a short-term contract prior to the 1983–84 season, but made no competitive appearances and retired soon after.

In April 1980, George lost a finger in a lawnmower accident.

=== After football ===
After retiring from football he moved to New Milton, Hampshire to run a pub. He later had joint-ownership for some years in a garage business. George is now employed by Arsenal in roles within corporate hospitality at the club.

== International career ==
George was capped five times for England at under-23 level. Whilst with Derby, he also won a solitary cap at senior level for England, playing for 60 minutes against the Republic of Ireland on 8 September 1976, out of position on the left wing, but fell out with coach Don Revie after being substituted and he was never picked again.

== Personal life ==
At the age of 19, George married Susan Farge and with her he has a daughter.

George was mentioned by musical act Steven North and the Flat Back Four in their songs titled "The Charlie George Calypso" and "I Wish I Could Play Like Charlie George", respectively.

== Honours ==
Arsenal

- Football League First Division: 1970–71
- FA Cup: 1970–71; runner-up: 1971–72
- Inter-Cities Fairs Cup: 1969–70

Derby County

- FA Charity Shield: 1975

Nottingham Forest

- UEFA Super Cup: 1979

Individual

- Derby County Player of the Year: 1976
