= Trevor Ross =

Footballer (born 1957)

Personal information
- Full name: Trevor William Ross
- Date of birth: 16 January 1957 (age 69)
- Place of birth: Ashton-under-Lyne, England
- Height: 5 ft 9 in (1.75 m)
- Position: Midfielder

Youth career
- 1972–1974: Arsenal

Senior career*
Years	Team	Apps	(Gls)
1974–1977	Arsenal	58	(5)
1977–1983	Everton	126	(16)
1982	→ Portsmouth (loan)	5	(0)
1982	→ Sheffield United (loan)	4	(0)
1983	AEK Athens	5	(0)
1984	Sheffield United	4	(0)
1984–1987	Bury	98	(11)
1987	Hyde United	5	(0)
1987–1988	Altrincham		

International career
1972	England Schoolboys	8	(0)
1977	Scotland U21	1	(0)

Managerial career
- 1989–1990: Ashton United
- * Club domestic league appearances and goals

Trevor William Ross (born 16 January 1957) is a former professional footballer who was a midfielder. Ross played for English clubs Arsenal, Everton, Portsmouth, Sheffield United and Bury. He also featured for AEK Athens of the Greek First Division. Born in England, Ross represented Scotland at under-21 level.

== Career ==
Ross started his career at Arsenal, joining the club's academy at 12. In 1972, he became an apprentice at the club, signing professionally just two years later. He then made his first-team debut as a substitute against Liverpool on 1 February 1975. Ross was a regular in the latter half of the 1975–76 and throughout the 1976–77 seasons. He was ousted from the side by David Price at the start of the 1977–78 season, and in November 1977 moved to Everton for £170,000. He played 67 games in all for Arsenal, scoring 9 goals.

Ross made his Everton debut on 5 November 1977 in a 1–0 defeat of Derby County. He then linked up on loan with sides Portsmouth and Sheffield United in the 1982–83 season. He went on to play 120 matches, scoring 16 goals for the Toffees. In the summer of 1982, Ross moved on to Sheffield.

On 30 June 1983 Ross was transferred to the Greek side, AEK Athens for a fee of 8 million drachma. His spell in Greece was cut short as he wasn't able to establish himself in the club and his contract was terminated on 14 December. Afterwards he returned for a brief stint with Sheffield United. Ross went on to see out his playing days in the Football League with three successful seasons at Bury, including a promotion to Division 3.

He then moved into non-league football, first a short spell with Hyde United before Tommy Docherty signed him up at Altrincham. He managed club Ashton United for the 1989–90 season until he was dismissed only three months into the next season.

== Personal life ==
After leaving football, Ross worked as an HGV driver. In 2007, he worked as a transport supervisor and coached youngsters at Oldham Sports Centre in his spare time.

Ross's father, Willie, was a footballer who played for Arbroath and Bradford City in the 1940s and 1950s. Ross could claim Scottish ancestry through his father and was capped once by Scotland at under-21 level, despite having played for his native England at schoolboy level.
