= Peter Simpson (footballer, born 1945) =

English footballer (1945–2026)

Personal information
- Full name: Peter Frederick Simpson
- Date of birth: 13 January 1945
- Place of birth: Gorleston, England
- Date of death: c. 13 May 2026 (aged 81)
- Positions: Centre half; left half

Youth career
- 1960–1964: Arsenal

Senior career*
Years	Team	Apps	(Gls)
1964–1978	Arsenal	370	(10)
1968	→ Boston Beacons (loan)	2	(0)
1969	→ Toronto Hellas (loan)		
1978–1979	New England Tea Men	50	(0)
1979–1981	Hendon	16	(0)
Total		438	(10)
- * Club domestic league appearances and goals

Peter Frederick Simpson (13 January 1945 – c. 13 May 2026) was an English footballer who played most of his career as a defender with Arsenal.

== Career ==
Born in Gorleston-on-Sea, Norfolk, Simpson initially joined Arsenal as a member of the club's groundstaff in 1960, before signing as an apprentice a year later in October 1961. He turned professional seven months later, in May 1962. He played for Arsenal's youth and reserve teams at first, before making his first team debut against Chelsea, in a First Division match on 14 March 1964; Arsenal lost 4–2.

Simpson was not immediately a regular in the Arsenal side, making just 22 appearances over the course of three seasons. However, with the appointment of Bertie Mee before the start of the 1966–67 season, Simpson was promoted to a first-team place, and became a mainstay of the Arsenal side for the best part of a decade. He started out as a utility man playing in every outfield position, but by the time he was a regular he had settled into the centre half position, usually alongside Frank McLintock.

He was a leading figure in Arsenal's brief period of success in the early 1970s. After losing both the 1968 and 1969 League Cup finals, Simpson was a key part of the side that won the Inter-Cities Fairs Cup in 1969–70, making a total of 57 appearances in all competitions that season. Simpson went on to be part of the side that won the League Championship and FA Cup Double in 1970–71; though he missed the first three months of that season with a cartilage problem, he returned in time for the FA Cup run, and appeared in the final, a 2–1 victory over Liverpool after extra time.

Despite his long career at the top, he was never capped for England, although he was called into a few squads by Alf Ramsey during 1969–70. He continued to play for the club in the trophyless years following the Double, playing more than 35 games a season for four seasons. However, by 1975 age was starting to get the better of him, and he only played nine times in 1975–76. He earned a recall in 1976–77, appearing in 25 games, but was dropped the following season. He left Arsenal in 1978, having played 477 times for the club, having scored 15 goals; as of 2026 he is tenth in the Arsenal all-time appearances list.

Following his time with Arsenal, he had a brief stint with the New England Tea Men of the NASL in the US, and then returned to England to play for non-league Hendon, before retiring. He had previously played in North America in 1968–69 with the NASL's Boston Beacons and the National Soccer League's Toronto Hellas.

== Death ==
Simpson's death at the age of 81 was announced on 13 May 2026.

== Honours ==
Arsenal

- Football League First Division: 1970–71
- FA Cup: 1970–71; runner-up 1971–72
- Inter-Cities Fairs Cup: 1969–70
- Football League Cup runner-up: 1967–68, 1968–69

Individual

- Arsenal Player of the Season: 1968−69
