= Pat Rice =

Northern Irish footballer (born 1949)

Pat Rice MBE
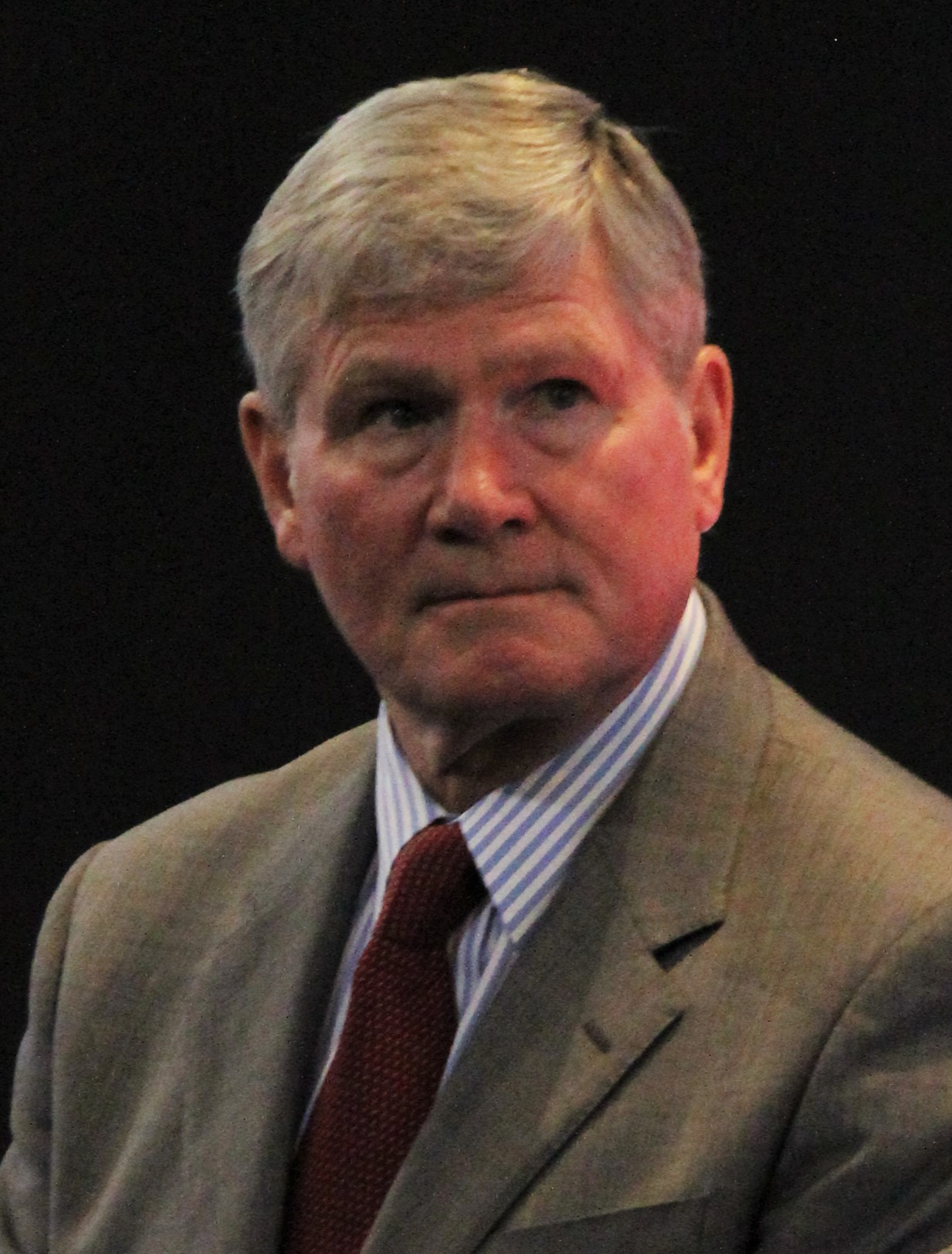
- Rice in 2015

Personal information
- Full name: Patrick James Rice
- Date of birth: 17 March 1949 (age 77)
- Place of birth: Belfast, Northern Ireland
- Height: 1.73 m (5 ft 8 in)
- Position: Right back

Senior career*
Years	Team	Apps	(Gls)
1967–1980	Arsenal	397	(12)
1980–1984	Watford	112	(1)
Total		509	(13)

International career
1968–1979	Northern Ireland	49	(0)

Managerial career
- 1996: Arsenal (caretaker)
- 1996–2012: Arsenal (assistant)
- * Club domestic league appearances and goals

Patrick James Rice, MBE (born 17 March 1949) is a Northern Irish former football player and coach. As a player, he made nearly 400 appearances for Arsenal, winning the Double, and later made a hundred more appearances for Watford. He also won 49 caps for Northern Ireland. After retirement from playing professionally he was at the helm of Arsenal's academy teams, before serving as caretaker manager and then assistant manager, a position he held since the appointment of Arsène Wenger in 1996. Rice helped the club to two more Doubles, amongst other silverware, in that time. He announced his retirement from the post on 10 May 2012.

== Playing career ==
=== Arsenal ===
Born in Belfast, Rice grew up in London where he attended Gifford Street Primary School as a young boy. He worked at a greengrocers shop on Gillespie Road within a mile of Highbury Stadium in Avenell Road. Veering toward the sport of football, Rice joined Arsenal as an apprentice in 1964. He turned professional in 1966 and worked his way up as a defender through the club's youth and reserve teams. Rice thereafter made his first-team debut in the League Cup against Burnley on 5 December 1967, a match that Arsenal won 2–1.

Playing in particular as a right back, Rice was initially a bit-part player, making only 16 appearances in his first three seasons at Arsenal. He also went on to miss out on Arsenal's 1969–70 Inter-Cities Fairs Cup win over RSC Anderlecht. However, during this time he won his first cap for Northern Ireland, against Israel on 10 September 1968, while still largely a reserve player. Peter Storey was Arsenal's first choice right back, but he was soon moved into central midfield at the start of the 1970–71 season. With this being so, Rice took his place and was a near-ever present figure in the side of that season, as Arsenal won the League and FA Cup Double. Rice remained first-choice right back for the club as he played in the 1972 FA Cup final as well. He was also a regular injury free presence for three full seasons being 1971–72, 1975–76 & 1976–77. Of the Double-winning side, he was the one who remained at the club the longest, taking up the role as club captain in 1977. As captain, Rice had the honour of lifting the FA Cup after Arsenal beat Manchester United in 1979, as well as losing two finals in 1978 and 1980. He is one of only 3 Arsenal players to have played in five FA Cup Finals (1970–71, 1971–72, 1977–78, 1978–79, 1979–80), the other two being David Seaman and Ray Parlour. He also led Arsenal to the 1980 UEFA Cup Winners' Cup Final, which Arsenal lost on penalties to Valencia.

Rice continued to play for Northern Ireland in this time, amassing 49 caps in an eleven-year career, which ended with his final international game against England on 17 October 1979, which ended in a 5–1 defeat. Rice finally left Arsenal in 1980 at the age of 31, by which time he had played 528 games in total for the club.

=== Watford ===
He moved to Graham Taylor's Watford where he helped the club as captain gain promotion to the First Division in 1981–82. Rice scored in Watford's first game in the top flight in 1982–83 against Everton before retiring from playing in 1984. In his final season he helped Watford reach the 1984 FA Cup final. After Wilf Rostron was suspended for the game Rice was considered to replace him but was ultimately left out of the squad. In all the defender played a total of 137 times for the Hornets.

== Coaching career ==
Rice rejoined Arsenal in 1984 as youth team coach, a post he held for the next 12 years, winning the FA Youth Cup twice in 1987–88 and 1993–94. In September 1996, Rice was briefly caretaker manager of the club after the resignation of Stewart Houston, who himself was caretaker after the sacking of Bruce Rioch. He managed the side for three FA Premier League matches (all of which Arsenal won) and a 3–2 defeat in the UEFA Cup at home to Borussia Mönchengladbach.

Upon the arrival of Arsène Wenger at the end of the month, Rice became his assistant, and played a key role in helping the club to their success in the 1990s and 2000s, including the Doubles of 1997–98 and 2001–02, and Arsenal's unbeaten League season of 2003–04. He holds the distinction (along with Bob Wilson) of having taken part, as player or coach, in all three of Arsenal's Doubles.

On 5 May 2012, it was announced that Rice would be stepping down after an accumulative 44 years with club, since joining as an apprentice, with the home game against Norwich being his final home game as Arsenal No.2. Wenger stated, "Pat is a true Arsenal legend and has committed almost his whole life to Arsenal Football Club, which shows huge loyalty and devotion to this club...I will always be indebted to him for his expert insight into Arsenal and football as a whole. On the training pitches and on matchdays, Pat has always been a passionate, loyal and insightful colleague, who we will all miss." His replacement was former Arsenal player Steve Bould.

Rice was appointed Member of the Order of the British Empire (MBE) in the 2013 New Year Honours for services to sport.

== Personal life ==
Pat Rice started training at Arsenal at age 14 and would spend all his spare time developing his fitness and football skills. Jon Sammels memory of Rice as a schoolboy who once requested Sammels autograph, "He [Pat] used to live down the road and his brother, Alf used to have the hairdressers at the bottom of Avenell Road where a lot of the lads used to get their hair cut. Pat was always outside kicking a ball around". Getty images pictured Rice, with his wife Betty holding son Stephen as a child, taken at their Cockfosters home in 1975. In the 1970s Rice co-wrote a regular football column with Steve Stammers for The Evening News.

In November 2013 it was announced that Rice had been admitted to hospital for cancer treatment.

After making a recovery in March 2014, he returned to The Emirates at half-time during an FA Cup game against Everton, making a joke about Spurs. The Gunners went on to win the game 4–1. After retiring from full time coaching Rice became an Arsenal scout.

== Honours ==
=== Player ===
Arsenal Youth

- FA Youth Cup: 1966

Arsenal

- Football League First Division: 1970–71
- FA Cup: 1970–71, 1978–79; runner-up: 1971–72, 1977–78, 1979–80

Watford

- Football League Second Division runner–up: 1981–82

Individual

- Arsenal Player of the Season: 1971–72

=== Youth Team Manager ===
Arsenal

- FA Youth Cup: 1988, 1994

=== Assistant Manager ===
Arsenal

- Premier League: 1997–98, 2001–02, 2003–04
- FA Cup: 1997–98, 2001–02, 2002–03, 2004–05
- FA Charity Shield / FA Community Shield: 1998, 1999, 2002, 2004

Sporting positions
Preceded by Alan Ball	Arsenal captain 1977–1980	Succeeded by David O'Leary
