= John Matthews (footballer) =

English footballer

Personal information
- Full name: John Melvin Matthews
- Date of birth: 1 November 1955 (age 71)
- Place of birth: Camden, London, England
- Height: 6 ft 0 in (1.83 m)
- Position: Midfielder

Youth career
- 1971–1973: Arsenal

Senior career*
Years	Team	Apps	(Gls)
1973–1978	Arsenal	45	(2)
1978–1982	Sheffield United	103	(14)
1982–1984	Mansfield Town	72	(6)
1984–1985	Chesterfield	38	(1)
1985–1989	Plymouth Argyle	135	(4)
1989–1990	Torquay United	25	(0)
1990–1991	Dorchester Town	3	(0)
- * Club domestic league appearances and goals

John Melvin Matthews (born 1 November 1955) is an English former professional footballer who played in the Football League as a midfielder for Arsenal, Sheffield United, Mansfield Town, Plymouth Argyle, Chesterfield and Torquay United.

== Career ==
Matthews was born in the London Borough of Camden, and played football for Islington Schools before joining Arsenal as an apprentice. He turned professional in August 1973 and made his league debut early the following season against Leicester City on 17 August 1974. He started his career in defence, mainly playing as a full back, but later moved into midfield; he made 57 appearances in four seasons with Arsenal but struggled to hold down a first team place, after breaking a leg and missing almost a whole season, and especially with Liam Brady and David Price monopolising the Arsenal midfield places. He left to join Sheffield United for a fee of £90,000 in August 1978, scoring 14 times in 103 games for the Blades before a free transfer move to Mansfield Town in August 1982. In August 1984, after six goals in 72 games for the Stags, he moved to Chesterfield, again on a free transfer.

The following season, he played a major role in Chesterfield's Fourth Division championship side, earning a free transfer move to Plymouth Argyle in August 1985 where he again gained promotion finishing runners up and promoted to the Second Division. He remained at Home Park until June 1989, joining Torquay United on a free transfer, having scored four times in 135 games for the Pilgrims. He played only 25 times for the Gulls before being released by his former Argyle manager, Dave Smith, at the end of the season, joining non-league Dorchester Town.

== Honours ==
Sheffield United

- Football League Fourth Division: 1981–82

Chesterfield

- Football League Fourth Division: 1984–85

Plymouth Argyle

- Football League Third Division runner-up: 1985–86
