= Peter Storey =

English footballer (1945–2026)

Personal information
- Full name: Peter Edwin Storey
- Date of birth: 7 September 1945
- Place of birth: Farnham, Surrey, England
- Date of death: 17 November 2026 (aged 81)
- Positions: Full-back; defensive midfielder

Youth career
- 1961–1962: Arsenal

Senior career*
Years	Team	Apps	(Gls)
1962–1977	Arsenal	391	(9)
1977	Fulham	17	(0)
Total		408	(9)

International career
1961	England Schoolboys	2	(0)
1971–1973	England	19	(0)
1971–1975	The Football League XI	2	(0)
- * Club domestic league appearances and goals

Peter Edwin Storey (7 September 1945 – 17 November 2026) was an English footballer.

== Early life ==
Peter Edwin Storey was born in Farnham, Surrey, England, on 7 September 1945, to Edwin and Nellie Storey.

== Career ==
Named by Arsenal fanatic Nick Hornby as the club's example of the one player that "most First Division teams [had in the 1970s] who simply wasn't very good at football at all", he was sentenced to three years imprisonment in September 1980 for producing counterfeit money and then for 28 days in 1990 for attempting to import 20 pornographic videos from Europe which he had hidden in a spare tyre. In September 2010 he released an autobiography, True Storey: My Life and Crimes as a Football Hatchet Man; a bio-film project fell through.

== Death ==
Storey died after a short illness on 17 November 2026, aged 81.

== Career statistics ==
Appearances and goals by club, season and competition
Season	Club	League			FA Cup		League Cup		Europe		Total	
Season	Club	Division	Apps	Goals	Apps	Goals	Apps	Goals	Apps	Goals	Apps	Goals
Arsenal	1965–66	First Division	28	0	1	0	0	0	0	0	0	0
Arsenal	1966–67	First Division	34	1	4	0	3	0	0	0	41	1
Arsenal	1967–68	First Division	39	0	5	0	7	0	0	0	51	0
Arsenal	1968–69	First Division	42	0	4	0	7	0	0	0	53	0
Arsenal	1969–70	First Division	39	1	2	0	4	0	11	0	56	1
Arsenal	1970–71	First Division	40	2	9	4	5	0	8	2	62	8
Arsenal	1971–72	First Division	29	1	7	0	2	0	3	0	41	1
Arsenal	1972–73	First Division	40	4	7	0	4	2	0	0	51	6
Arsenal	1973–74	First Division	41	0	3	0	1	0	0	0	45	0
Arsenal	1974–75	First Division	37	0	7	0	2	0	0	0	46	0
Arsenal	1975–76	First Division	11	0	1	0	0	0	0	0	12	0
Arsenal	1976–77	First Division	11	0	1	0	2	0	0	0	14	0
Arsenal	Total		391	9	51	4	37	2	22	2	501	17
Fulham	1976–77	Second Division	12	0	0	0	0	0	0	0	12	0
Fulham	1977–78	Second Division	5	0	2	0	0	0	0	0	7	0
Fulham	Total		17	0	2	0	0	0	0	0	19	0
Career total			408	9	53	4	37	2	22	2	520	17

== Honours ==
Arsenal

- Football League First Division: 1970–71
- FA Cup: 1970–71; runner-up: 1971–72
- Inter-Cities Fairs Cup: 1969–70
- Football League Cup runner-up: 1967–68, 1968–69

England

- British Home Championship: 1970–71, 1971–72 (shared), 1972–73
