= Wilf Rostron =

English footballer

Personal information
- Full name: John Wilfred Rostron
- Date of birth: 29 September 1956 (age 70)
- Place of birth: Sunderland, England
- Height: 5 ft 7 in (1.70 m)
- Positions: Defender; midfielder

Youth career
- Arsenal

Senior career*
Years	Team	Apps	(Gls)
1973–1977	Arsenal	17	(2)
1977–1979	Sunderland	76	(7)
1979–1989	Watford	317	(22)
1989	Sheffield Wednesday	7	(0)
1989–1991	Sheffield United	36	(3)
1991	Brentford	42	(2)
Total		495	(46)

International career
1972	England Schoolboys	8	(8)
- * Club domestic league appearances and goals

John Wilfred Rostron (born 29 September 1956) is an English former footballer who made nearly 500 appearances in the Football League. He spent ten years with Watford and had shorter spells with Arsenal, Sunderland, Sheffield Wednesday, Sheffield United and Brentford. He started off as a left-winger but then spent most of his career as a left-back.

== Playing career ==
Rostron started his career at Arsenal, signing professional terms in October 1973 after a season as an amateur playing in Arsenal's youth team. He made his first-team debut against Newcastle United on 18 March 1975 and played a total of six league matches that season. However, he could not fully break into the Arsenal first team, making only 19 appearances for the club in three seasons, scoring two goals. He moved to home town club Sunderland in July 1977 for £40,000.

After two seasons at Sunderland, Rostron signed for Watford in October 1979 for £150,000. Playing as a left-winger he had sporadic success. During the 1980–81 Watford manager Graham Taylor played Rostron as a left-back to his initial surprise. Rostron played well and went on to make that position his own. He was part of the Watford side that achieved promotion to Division One in the 1981–82 season. He then won the club's Player of the Season award as Watford got to their highest ever finish of 2nd in the 1982–83 season.

In the 1983–84 season Watford reached the FA Cup Final. Rostron, by this time Watford's captain, was sent off in a league fixture against Luton Town preceding the final and incurred a suspension. He was consigned to the sidelines as Watford lost 2–0 to Everton. Nonetheless, Rostron won the Player of the Season award again that year. Rostron was capped over 400 times for the Hornets, scoring 30 goals altogether.

He moved on to join Sheffield Wednesday on a free transfer in January 1989. His spell at Hillsborough lasted only 8 months, and he was loaned to the Owls' rivals Sheffield United in September 1989, a move which was made permanent in November of that year. Rostron made 36 appearances for the Blades, scoring three times in all. One of his goals was in the 5-2 victory at Leicester on 5th May 1990, which helped the Blades seal promotion to the top division as Wednesday got relegated on the same day. He moved to Brentford in January 1991 where he brought an end to his playing days two years later.

== Managerial career ==
He became the assistant manager of clubs Brentford and Gateshead in 1993. He then went on to manage Sunderland Ryhope CW during 1994.

== Personal life ==
After his playing days came to an end Rostron worked for a furniture company. He later went on to establish his own furniture business. He settled in Sunderland.

== Honours ==
Brentford

- Football League Third Division: 1991–92

Individual

- Watford Player of the Season: 1982–83, 1983–84
