= Sammy Nelson =

Northern Irish footballer

Personal information
- Full name: Samuel Nelson
- Date of birth: 1 April 1949 (age 77)
- Place of birth: Belfast, Northern Ireland
- Height: 1.78 m (5 ft 10 in)
- Position: Left-back

Senior career*
Years	Team	Apps	(Gls)
1966–1981	Arsenal	255	(10)
1981–1983	Brighton & Hove Albion	40	(1)
Total		295	(11)

International career
1970–1982	Northern Ireland	51	(1)
- * Club domestic league appearances and goals

Samuel Nelson (born 1 April 1949) is a former footballer who played as a left back in the Football League for Arsenal and Brighton & Hove Albion. He was capped 51 times for Northern Ireland and played at the 1982 FIFA World Cup.

== Club career ==
=== Arsenal ===
Nelson was born in Belfast where he attended the Royal Belfast Academical Institution, a rugby-playing school. He joined Arsenal as a 16-year-old, and turned professional on his 17th birthday in 1966. Originally a left-winger, he was later moved back into defence to become a left back. Nelson played in the 1966 FA Youth Cup final in which Arsenal beat Sunderland 5–3 over two legs.

He was a regular in Arsenal's reserve side for several seasons, before making his first-team debut against Ipswich Town on 25 October 1969. He was an understudy to the Gunners' established left back, Bob McNab, and only when McNab was injured in the 1971–72 season did Nelson become a regular. Even then, whenever McNab returned to fitness, Nelson was forced to step down. He made two appearances in Arsenal's successful 1969–70 Fairs Cup campaign but played no part in the final itself, and his four league matches during the 1970–71 Double-winning season were not sufficient for a medal.

McNab left Arsenal in the summer of 1975, and Nelson finally became Arsenal's first-choice left back. An aggressive, hard-tackling player, he was a crowd favourite and known for his cheeky sense of humour. For the next five seasons he was a near ever-present in the Arsenal side, and he played in all three of their successive FA Cup finals, in the starting eleven in 1978 and 1979 and as a substitute in 1980. The only win was in 1979, in which Arsenal beat Manchester United by a 3–2 scoreline. Nelson also played in the 1980 European Cup Winners' Cup Final, which Arsenal lost to Valencia on penalties.

With the arrival of England international Kenny Sansom at the club in 1980, Nelson again found himself out of the first team. He left Arsenal in 1981 to join Brighton & Hove Albion. He played 339 first-class matches for the Gunners in total, and scored 12 goals.

=== Brighton & Hove Albion ===
Nelson made 45 appearances in all competitions in his two seasons with Brighton. In the second, 1982–83, they were relegated from the First Division but reached the 1983 FA Cup Final, losing to Manchester United 4–0 in a replay after the original match finished 2–2; Nelson was not selected for either match. He retired as a player that summer.

== International career ==
Nelson made his debut for Northern Ireland as a substitute against England on 21 April 1970. He went on to win 51 international caps, two of which came in Northern Ireland's matches at the 1982 World Cup.

== Later career and personal life ==
After spending a season as a coach at Brighton & Hove Albion, Nelson left the game completely and went into the insurance industry. He has also led the "Legends Tour" at Arsenal's Emirates Stadium.

Nelson is married with three children. His daughter Emily is married to English cricketer Matt Prior.

== Honours ==
Arsenal Youth

- FA Youth Cup: 1965–66

Arsenal

- FA Cup: 1978–79; runner-up: 1977–78, 1979–80
