= Bertie Mee =

English football manager (1918–2001)

Bertie Mee OBE
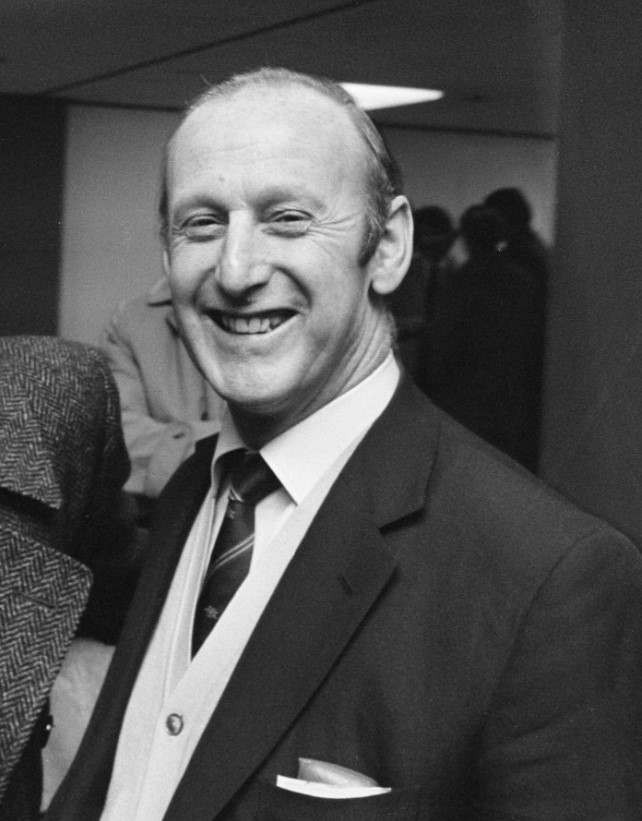
- Mee in 1972

Personal information
- Full name: Bertram Mee
- Date of birth: 25 December 1918
- Place of birth: Highbury Vale, Nottingham, England
- Date of death: 21 October 2001 (aged 82)
- Place of death: Barnet, England
- Position: Winger

Senior career*
Years	Team	Apps	(Gls)
1938–1939	Derby County	0	(0)
1939	Mansfield Town	13	(0)

Managerial career
- 1966–1976: Arsenal
- * Club domestic league appearances and goals

Bertram Mee OBE (25 December 1918 – 21 October 2001) was an English football player and manager. After his playing career was cut short by injury, he later became a manager and led Arsenal to their first Double win in 1971.

== Playing career ==
Born in Highbury Vale, Nottingham, and the younger brother of fellow footballer Georgie Mee, he played for Derby County and Mansfield Town. In the 1940–41 season, Mee made 16 guest appearances for Southampton, scoring twice.

After his playing career was cut short by injury, Mee joined the Royal Army Medical Corps where he trained as a physiotherapist and spent six years, rising to the rank of sergeant. After leaving, he worked for various football clubs as a physiotherapist before joining Arsenal in 1960, succeeding Billy Milne.

== Managerial career ==
=== Arsenal ===
After the sacking of Billy Wright in 1966, the club asked Mee to become manager, a highly surprising move, perhaps even to the man himself; Mee asked for a get-out clause for him to return to physiotherapist after twelve months if his tenure was unsuccessful. Mee recruited Dave Sexton and Don Howe as his assistants, in order to make up for any tactical shortcomings of his own.

Arsenal had not won a trophy since 1953, but, under Mee, with a crop of players from Arsenal's youth system, such as Charlie George, John Radford, Pat Rice and Ray Kennedy, began to show promise. Arsenal reached two successive League Cup finals in 1968 and 1969 but lost them both, to Leeds United and Swindon Town respectively. However, the following season, the club won its first European trophy and its first trophy of any kind for seventeen years, beating Anderlecht to claim the Inter-Cities Fairs Cup, 4–3 on aggregate. After being 3–0 down in the away leg, Arsenal grabbed a late consolation and then beat the Belgian side 3–0 at Highbury.

The Fairs Cup was only the warm-up for the main act, namely the FA Cup and League Double win in 1971. The League title was won at White Hart Lane, home of their rivals Tottenham Hotspur, on 3 May, the last day of the season; five days later, Arsenal beat Liverpool 2–1 at Wembley after extra-time, the winning goal scored by George. It was only the second time a team had won the Double in the 20th century.

Arsenal had ambitions to retain their title the following season and signed Alan Ball from Everton. However, their league campaign faltered and their hopes of a trophy depended on the FA Cup, where Arsenal had again reached the final, this time facing Leeds United. Arsenal lost by a single goal. Arsenal also participated in the European Cup, but was defeated in the quarter-finals by eventual winners Ajax.

In the 1972–73 season, Arsenal managed a serious championship challenge, at one point topping the table, but eventually finished runners-up. A run in the FA Cup was brought to an end by a semi-final defeat to eventual winners Sunderland.

Mee then began to break up the team which had won the double, and players such as Kennedy, George and captain Frank McLintock departed. Mee announced his resignation in 1976 as Arsenal's most successful manager in terms of victories with 241 wins, a number that would not be surpassed until 2006 by Arsène Wenger. Mee was succeeded by Terry Neill.

== Later career ==
In 1978, he joined Watford as assistant to Graham Taylor and in charge of scouting. He later became a director of the Hornets before retiring in 1991. In 2008, he was posthumously inducted into the National Football Museum's Hall of Fame.

== Personal life ==
Mee was made an Officer of the Order of the British Empire (OBE) in the 1984 New Year Honours for services to football. Mee died on 21 October 2001, survived by his wife Doris and two daughters, Alison and Beverley.

== Honours ==
=== Managerial ===
Arsenal

- Football League First Division: 1970–71
- FA Cup: 1970–71; runner up 1971–72
- Inter-Cities Fairs Cup: 1969–70
- Football League Cup runner up: 1967–68, 1968–69

=== Individual ===
- Manager of the Year: 1971
- Order of the British Empire: 1984
- English Football Hall of Fame: 2008

== See also ==
- List of English football championship winning managers
