= 1970–71 Football League First Division =

1970–71 season of Football League First Division

Football League First Division
- Season: 1970–71
- Champions: Arsenal; 8th English title
- Relegated: Burnley; Blackpool
- European Cup: Arsenal
- European Cup Winners' Cup: Liverpool; Chelsea
- UEFA Cup: Leeds United; Tottenham Hotspur; Wolverhampton Wanderers; Southampton
- Watney Cup: Manchester United; West Bromwich Albion
- Matches: 462
- Goals: 1,089 (2.36 per match)
- Top goalscorer: Tony Brown (28 goals)
- Biggest home win: Southampton 6–0 Crystal Palace (4 March 1971)
- Biggest away win: Burnley 0–4 Manchester City (19 December 1970)
- Highest scoring: Arsenal 6–2 West Bromwich Albion (19 September 1970); Derby County 4–4 Manchester United (26 December 1970); Crystal Palace 3–5 Manchester United (17 April 1971)
- Longest winning run: 9 matches Arsenal
- Longest unbeaten run: 16 matches Leeds United
- Longest losing run: 7 matches Blackpool

Statistics of Football League First Division in the 1970–71 season.

== Overview ==
Arsenal won the First Division title for the eighth time in the club's history that season. They also won the FA Cup to complete the club's first double. Arsenal wrapped up the title on 3 May, with a 1–0 win at North London rivals Tottenham Hotspur. Blackpool were relegated on 12 April, after only holding Tottenham Hotspur to a 0–0 draw at home. Burnley joined them on 24 April, after losing 2–1 at home to Derby County, which meant West Ham United's 1–1 draw at Manchester United saved the Hammers from relegation.

== League standings ==
Pos	Team	Pld	W	D	L	GF	GA	GAv	Pts	Qualification or relegation
1	Arsenal (C)	42	29	7	6	71	29	2.448	65	Qualification for the European Cup first round
2	Leeds United	42	27	10	5	72	30	2.400	64	Qualification for the UEFA Cup first round
3	Tottenham Hotspur	42	19	14	9	54	33	1.636	52	Qualification for the UEFA Cup first round
4	Wolverhampton Wanderers	42	22	8	12	64	54	1.185	52	Qualification for the UEFA Cup first round
5	Liverpool	42	17	17	8	42	24	1.750	51	Qualification for the European Cup Winners' Cup first round (Note: Liverpool qualified for the European Cup Winners' Cup as FA Cup runners-up, as winners, Arsenal, qualified for the European Cup.)
6	Chelsea	42	18	15	9	52	42	1.238	51	Qualification for the European Cup Winners' Cup first round (Note: Chelsea qualified for the European Cup Winners' Cup as the 1970-71 European Cup Winners' Cup winners.)
7	Southampton	42	17	12	13	56	44	1.273	46	Qualification for the UEFA Cup first round
8	Manchester United	42	16	11	15	65	66	0.985	43	Qualification for the Watney Cup (Note: Manchester United and West Bromwich Albion qualified for the Watney Cup as the two teams with the most goals that hadn't already qualified for a European competition.)
9	Derby County	42	16	10	16	56	54	1.037	42	
10	Coventry City	42	16	10	16	37	38	0.974	42	
11	Manchester City	42	12	17	13	47	42	1.119	41	
12	Newcastle United	42	14	13	15	44	46	0.957	41	
13	Stoke City	42	12	13	17	44	48	0.917	37	
14	Everton	42	12	13	17	54	60	0.900	37	
15	Huddersfield Town	42	11	14	17	40	49	0.816	36	
16	Nottingham Forest	42	14	8	20	42	61	0.689	36	
17	West Bromwich Albion	42	10	15	17	58	75	0.773	35	Qualification for the Watney Cup
18	Crystal Palace	42	12	11	19	39	57	0.684	35	
19	Ipswich Town	42	12	10	20	42	48	0.875	34	
20	West Ham United	42	10	14	18	47	60	0.783	34	
21	Burnley (R)	42	7	13	22	29	63	0.460	27	Relegation to the Second Division
22	Blackpool (R)	42	4	15	23	34	66	0.515	23	Relegation to the Second Division

Source: World Football
Rules for classification: 1) Points; 2) Goal average; 3) Goals scored
(C) Champions; (R) Relegated

== Results ==
Home \ Away	ARS	BLP	BUR	CHE	COV	CRY	DER	EVE	HUD	IPS	LEE	LIV	MCI	MUN	NEW	NOT	SOU	STK	TOT	WBA	WHU	WOL
Arsenal		1–0	1–0	2–0	1–0	1–1	2–0	4–0	1–0	3–2	0–0	2–0	1–0	4–0	1–0	4–0	0–0	1–0	2–0	6–2	2–0	2–1
Blackpool	0–1		1–1	3–4	1–0	3–1	0–1	0–2	2–2	0–2	1–1	0–0	3–3	1–1	0–1	2–3	0–3	1–1	0–0	3–1	1–1	0–2
Burnley	1–2	1–0		0–0	0–0	2–1	1–2	2–2	2–3	2–2	0–3	1–2	0–4	0–2	1–1	2–1	0–1	1–1	0–0	1–1	1–0	2–3
Chelsea	2–1	2–0	0–1		2–1	1–1	2–1	2–2	0–0	2–1	3–1	1–0	1–1	1–2	1–0	2–0	2–2	2–1	0–2	4–1	2–1	2–2
Coventry City	1–3	2–0	3–0	0–1		2–1	0–0	3–1	0–0	1–0	0–1	1–0	2–1	2–1	2–0	2–0	1–0	1–0	0–0	1–1	0–1	0–1
Crystal Palace	0–2	1–0	0–2	0–0	1–2		0–0	2–0	0–3	1–0	1–1	1–0	0–1	3–5	1–0	2–0	3–1	3–2	0–3	3–0	1–1	1–1
Derby County	2–0	2–0	1–0	1–2	3–4	1–0		3–1	3–2	2–0	0–2	0–0	0–0	4–4	1–2	1–2	0–0	2–0	1–1	2–0	2–4	1–2
Everton	2–2	0–0	1–1	3–0	3–0	3–1	1–1		2–1	2–0	0–1	0–0	0–1	1–0	3–1	1–0	4–1	2–0	0–0	3–3	0–1	1–2
Huddersfield Town	2–1	3–0	0–1	0–1	1–0	0–2	0–0	1–1		1–0	0–0	0–0	1–0	1–2	1–1	0–0	3–1	0–1	1–1	2–1	1–1	1–2
Ipswich Town	0–1	2–1	3–0	0–0	0–2	1–2	0–1	0–0	2–0		2–4	1–0	2–0	4–0	1–0	0–0	1–3	2–0	1–2	2–2	2–1	2–3
Leeds United	1–0	3–1	4–0	1–0	2–0	2–1	1–0	3–2	2–0	0–0		0–1	1–0	2–2	3–0	2–0	1–0	4–1	1–2	1–2	3–0	3–0
Liverpool	2–0	2–2	2–0	1–0	0–0	1–1	2–0	3–2	4–0	2–1	1–1		0–0	1–1	1–1	3–0	1–0	0–0	0–0	1–1	1–0	2–0
Manchester City	0–2	2–0	0–0	1–1	1–1	1–0	1–1	3–0	1–1	2–0	0–2	2–2		3–4	1–1	1–3	1–1	4–1	0–1	4–1	2–0	0–0
Manchester United	1–3	1–1	1–1	0–0	2–0	0–1	1–2	2–0	1–1	3–2	0–1	0–2	1–4		1–0	2–0	5–1	2–2	2–1	2–1	1–1	1–0
Newcastle United	1–1	1–2	3–1	0–1	0–0	2–0	3–1	2–1	2–0	0–0	1–1	0–0	0–0	1–0		1–1	2–2	0–2	1–0	3–0	1–1	3–2
Nottingham Forest	0–3	3–1	1–0	1–1	2–0	3–1	2–4	3–2	1–3	0–1	0–0	0–1	0–1	1–2	2–1		2–0	0–0	0–1	3–3	1–0	4–1
Southampton	1–2	1–1	2–0	0–0	3–0	6–0	4–0	2–2	1–0	1–0	0–3	1–0	1–1	1–0	2–0	4–1		2–1	0–0	1–0	1–2	1–2
Stoke City	5–0	1–1	0–0	1–2	2–1	0–0	1–0	1–1	3–1	0–0	3–0	0–1	2–0	1–2	3–0	0–0	0–0		0–1	2–0	2–1	1–0
Tottenham Hotspur	0–1	3–0	4–0	2–1	1–0	2–0	2–1	2–1	1–1	2–0	0–2	1–0	2–0	2–2	1–2	0–1	1–3	3–0		2–2	2–2	0–0
West Bromwich Albion	2–2	1–1	1–0	2–2	0–0	0–0	2–1	3–0	2–1	0–1	2–2	1–1	0–0	4–3	1–2	0–1	1–0	5–2	3–1		2–1	2–4
West Ham United	0–0	2–1	3–1	2–2	1–2	0–0	1–4	1–2	0–1	2–2	2–3	1–2	0–0	2–1	0–2	2–0	1–1	1–0	2–2	2–1		3–3
Wolverhampton Wanderers	0–3	1–0	1–0	1–0	0–0	2–1	2–4	2–0	3–1	0–0	2–3	1–0	3–0	3–2	3–2	4–0	0–1	1–1	0–3	2–1	2–0	

Updated to match(es) played on unknown. Source: Ian Laschke: Rothmans Book of Football League Records 1888–89 to 1978–79. Macdonald and Jane’s, London & Sydney, 1980.
Legend: Blue = home team win; Yellow = draw; Red = away team win.

== Managerial changes ==
Team	Outgoing manager	Manner of departure	Date of vacancy	Position in table	Incoming manager	Date of appointment
Blackpool	(England) Les Shannon	Sacked	26 October 1970	21st	(England) Jimmy Meadows (caretaker)	26 October 1970
Blackpool	(England) Jimmy Meadows	End of caretaker spell	20 December 1970	22nd	(England) Bob Stokoe	20 December 1970
Manchester United	(England) Wilf McGuinness	Demoted to coach	29 December 1970	18th	(Scotland) Matt Busby (caretaker)	29 December 1970

== Team locations ==
Locations of the Football League First Division 1970–1971 teams
Locations of the Football League First Division London teams 1970–1971

== Top goalscorers ==
- Goalscorers are listed order of total goals, then according to the number of league goals, then of FA cup goals, then of League Cup goals. A dash means the team of the player in question did not participate in European competitions.

Rank	Scorer	Club	League goals	FA Cup goals	League Cup goals	Texaco Cup goals	Euro competitions	Total
1	(England) Martin Chivers	Tottenham Hotspur	21	1	7	5	—	34
2	(England) Tony Brown	West Bromwich Albion	28	2	0	0	—	30
3	(England) Ray Kennedy	Arsenal	19	2	2	—	3	26
4	(England) Bobby Gould	Wolverhampton Wanderers	17	2	0	5	—	24
5	(England) Allan Clarke	Leeds United	19	1	0	—	3	23
6	(England) Joe Royle	Everton	17	2	0	—	4	23
7	(England) Ian Storey-Moore	Nottingham Forest	18	2	1	1	—	22
8	(Northern Ireland) George Best	Manchester United	18	1	2	—	—	21
9	(Wales) Ron Davies	Southampton	17	4	0	—	0	21
10	(England) John Radford	Arsenal	15	2	1	—	3	21
11	(England) Mick Channon	Southampton	18	1	1	—	0	20
12	(Scotland) Hugh Curran	Wolverhampton Wanderers	16	0	0	4	—	20
13	(England) Francis Lee	Manchester City	14	0	1	—	4	19
14	(England) Colin Bell	Manchester City	13	4	0	—	2	19
15	(Wales) John Toschack	Liverpool / Cardiff City	5 + 8	1	0	—	0 + 5	19
16	(Scotland) Peter Lorimer	Leeds United	12	2	0	—	5	19
17	(England) Martin Peters	Tottenham Hotspur	9	2	4	4	—	19
18	(England) John Ritchie	Stoke City	13	4	0	0	—	17
19	(Scotland) Alan Gilzean	Tottenham Hotspur	9	4	4	0	—	17
20	(Scotland) Denis Law	Manchester United	15	0	1	—	—	16
=	(England) Geoff Hurst	West Ham United	15	0	1	—	—	16
22	(Republic of Ireland) Johnny Giles	Leeds United	13	2	0	—	1	16
23	(England) Jeff Astle	West Bromwich Albion	13	1	1	0	—	15
=	(Scotland) John O’Hare	Derby County	13	1	1	—	—	15
25	(England) Alun Evans	Liverpool	10	1	1	—	3	15
26	(England) John Tudor	Newcastle United / Sheffield United	5 + 9	0	0	—	0	14
27	(England) Keith Weller	Chelsea	13	0	1	—	0	14
28	(Republic of Ireland) Terry Conroy	Stoke City	11	2	1	0	—	14
29	(Scotland) George Graham	Arsenal	11	1	1	—	1	14
30	(Scotland) Neil Martin	Coventry City / Nottingham Forest	1 + 9	2	0	0	2	14
31	(England) Pop Robson	Newcastle United / West Ham United	3 + 9	0 + 1	0	—	0	13
32	(Northern Ireland) Derek Dougan	Wolverhampton Wanderers	12	0	0	1	—	13
33	(England) Alan Birchenall	Crystal Palace	10	1	2	—	—	13
34	(England) Ernie Hunt	Coventry City	10	1	1	—	1	13
35	(England) Brian Kidd	Manchester United	8	0	5	—	—	13
36	(England) Kevin Hector	Derby County	11	0	1	—	—	12
37	(South Africa) / (England) Colin Viljoen	Ipswich Town	10	2	0	—	—	12
38	(England) Alan Hinton	Derby County	10	1	1	—	—	12
39	(Scotland) Gerry Queen	Crystal Palace	9	0	3	—	—	12
40	(Scotland) Peter Cormack	Nottingham Forest	8	1	1	2	—	12
41	(England) Frank Worthington	Huddersfield Town	9	2	0	—	—	11
42	(England) Micky Burns	Blackpool	10	0	0	—	—	10
43	(England) Frank James Clarke	Ipswich Town	8	2	0	—	—	10
44	(England) Jimmy Greenhoff	Stoke City	7	3	0	0	—	10
45	(England) Charlie George	Arsenal	5	5	0	—	0	10

- The listing above is from the Rothmans Football Yearbook 1971–72, pp. 465–468. The Queen Anne Press Limited. Compiled by Tony Williams and Roy Peskett. Editorial Board: Denis Howell, Sir Matt Busby, David Coleman, Jimmy Hill, Tony Williams and Roy Peskett.
