= 1957–58 Arsenal F.C. season =

English football club season

Arsenal
1957–58 season
- Chairman: Bracewell Smith
- Manager: Jack Crayston
- First Division: 12th
- FA Cup: Third round
Home colours	Away colours

During the 1957–58 English football season, Arsenal F.C. competed in the Football League First Division.

== Final league table ==
Pos	Team	Pld	W	D	L	GF	GA	GAv	Pts	Qualification or relegation
10	Nottingham Forest	42	16	10	16	69	63	1.095	42	
11	Chelsea	42	15	12	15	83	79	1.051	42	Qualification for the Inter-Cities Fairs Cup first round
12	Arsenal	42	16	7	19	73	85	0.859	39	
13	Birmingham City	42	14	11	17	76	89	0.854	39	Qualification for the Inter-Cities Fairs Cup first round
14	Aston Villa	42	16	7	19	73	86	0.849	39	

Source: World Football
Rules for classification: 1) Points; 2) Goal average; 3) Goals scored

== Results ==
Arsenal's score comes first

=== Legend ===
Win	Draw	Loss

=== Football League First Division ===
First Division match results
Date	Opponent	Venue	Result F–A	Scorers	Attendance
24 August 1957	Sunderland	A	1–0	Groves	56,493
27 August 1957	West Bromwich Albion	H	2–2	Herd (2)	48,988
31 August 1957	Luton Town	H	2–0	Groves, Holton	49,914
4 September 1957	West Bromwich Albion	A	2–1	Bloomfield, Swallow	29,117
7 September 1957	Blackpool	A	0–1		31,486
10 September 1957	Everton	H	2–3	Groves (2)	42,013
14 September 1957	Leicester City	H	3–1	Groves (2), Herd	45,369
21 September 1957	Manchester United	A	2–4	Tiddy, Herd	47,389
28 September 1957	Leeds United	H	2–1	Herd (2)	39,538
2 October 1957	Aston Villa	H	4–0	Swallow, Tiddy, Bloomfield, Herd	18,382
5 October 1957	Bolton Wanderers	A	1–0	Herd	20,212
12 October 1957	Tottenham Hotspur	A	1–3	Holton	60,671
16 October 1957	Everton	A	2–2	Bloomfield, Herd	54,345
19 October 1957	Birmingham City	H	1–3	Swallow	39,031
26 October 1957	Chelsea	A	0–0		66,007
2 November 1957	Manchester City	H	2–1	Tapscott, Bloomfield	43,692
9 November 1957	Nottingham Forest	A	0–4		34,266
16 November 1957	Portsmouth	H	3–2	Herd (2), Clapton	40,532
23 November 1957	Sheffield Wednesday	A	0–2		23,904
30 November 1957	Newcastle United	H	2–3	Holton, Clapton	41,697
7 December 1957	Burnley	A	1–2	Holton	18,593
14 December 1957	Preston North End	H	4–2	Nutt, Herd, Bloomfield, Dun (o.g.)	31,840
21 December 1957	Sunderland	H	3–0	Herd (2), Groves	28,156
26 December 1957	Aston Villa	A	0–3		38,383
28 December 1957	Luton Town	A	0–4		27,493
11 January 1958	Blackpool	H	2–3	Herd (2)	43,447
18 January 1958	Leicester City	A	1–2	Groves	31,778
1 February 1958	Manchester United	H	4–5	Bloomfield (2), Herd, Tapscott	63,578
18 February 1958	Bolton Wanderers	A	1–1	Bloomfield	28,425
22 February 1958	Tottenham Hotspur	H	4–4	Clapton, Herd, Nutt, Henry (o.g.)	59,118
1 March 1958	Birmingham City	A	1–4	Bloomfield	26,834
8 March 1958	Chelsea	H	5–4	Herd (3), Clapton, Bloomfield	41,620
15 March 1958	Manchester City	A	4–2	Bloomfield (3), Herd	31,645
19 March 1958	Leeds United	A	0–2		25,948
22 March 1958	Sheffield Wednesday	H	1–0	Herd	28,106
29 March 1958	Portsmouth	A	4–5	Bloomfield, Clapton, Nutt, Gunter (o.g.)	25,999
7 April 1958	Wolverhampton Wanderers	H	0–2		51,340
8 April 1958	Wolverhampton Wanderers	A	2–1	Groves, Wills (pen.)	47,501
12 April 1958	Newcastle United	A	3–3	Herd, Groves, Bloomfield	43,221
19 April 1958	Burnley	H	0–0		31,440
21 April 1958	Nottingham Forest	H	1–1	Bloomfield	23,217
26 April 1958	Preston North End	A	0–3		21,538

=== FA Cup ===
FA Cup match results
Round	Date	Opponent	Venue	Result F–A	Scorers	Attendance
Third round	4 January 1958	Northampton Town	A	1–3	Clapton	21,344

== Squad ==
Note: Flags indicate national team as defined under FIFA eligibility rules; some limited exceptions apply. Players may hold more than one non-FIFA nationality.

Pos.	Nation	Player
GK	WAL	Jack Kelsey
DF	ENG	Len Wills
DF	SCO	John Snedden
DF	NIR	Billy McCullough
MF	ENG	John Barnwell
MF	SCO	Tommy Docherty
FW	SCO	David Herd
FW	SCO	Jackie Henderson
FW	ENG	Vic Groves
GK	NIR	Jack McClelland
FW	WAL	Mel Charles
FW	ENG	George Eastham
FW	ENG	Geoff Strong
MF	ENG	Danny Clapton
MF	ENG	Alan Skirton

Pos.	Nation	Player
DF	NIR	Terry Neill
DF	ENG	Dave Bacuzzi
FW	ENG	Jimmy Bloomfield
MF	IRL	Joe Haverty
MF	ENG	Gerry Ward
DF	NIR	Eddie Magill
DF	ENG	Mike Everitt
FW	SCO	Peter Kane
DF	ENG	Allan Young
MF	IRL	Frank O'Neill
GK	ENG	Jim Standen
FW	ENG	Dennis Clapton
MF	WAL	Arfon Griffiths
MF	ENG	John Petts
