= 1956–57 Arsenal F.C. season =

English football club season

Arsenal
1956–57 season
- Chairman: Bracewell Smith
- Manager: Tom Whittaker (to 24 October); Jack Crayston (from 24 October)
- First Division: 5th
- FA Cup: Sixth round
Home colours	Away colours

During the 1956–57 English football season, Arsenal F.C. competed in the Football League First Division. They finished with a total of 50 points, while coming out victorious in 21 games, losing 13, and finishing 8 in a draw. They finished fifth place in the league just below Preston North End and Blackpool, which was a mediocre season for this organization.

== Final league table ==
Pos	Team	Pld	W	D	L	GF	GA	GAv	Pts
3	Preston North End	42	23	10	9	84	56	1.500	56
4	Blackpool	42	22	9	11	93	65	1.431	53
5	Arsenal	42	21	8	13	85	69	1.232	50
6	Wolverhampton Wanderers	42	20	8	14	94	70	1.343	48
7	Burnley	42	18	10	14	56	50	1.120	46

Source: World Football
Rules for classification: 1) Points; 2) Goal average; 3) Goals scored

== Results ==
Arsenal's score comes first

=== Legend ===
Win	Draw	Loss

=== Football League First Division ===
Date	Opponent	Venue	Result	Attendance	Scorers
18 August 1956	Cardiff City	H	0–0	51,069	
21 August 1956	Burnley	H	2–0	38,321	
25 August 1956	Birmingham City	A	2–4	37,197	
28 August 1956	Burnley	A	1–3	19,049	
1 September 1956	West Bromwich Albion	H	4–1	45,973	
4 September 1956	Preston North End	H	1–2	40,470	
8 September 1956	Portsmouth	A	3–2	30,768	
10 September 1956	Preston North End	A	0–3	35,510	
15 September 1956	Newcastle United	H	0–1	46,318	
22 September 1956	Sheffield Wednesday	A	4–2	40,043	
29 September 1956	Manchester United	H	1–2	62,479	
6 October 1956	Manchester City	H	7–3	33,652	
13 October 1956	Charlton Athletic	A	3–1	40,051	
20 October 1956	Tottenham Hotspur	H	3–1	60,588	
27 October 1956	Everton	A	0–4	52,478	
3 November 1956	Aston Villa	H	2–1	40,045	
10 November 1956	Wolverhampton Wanderers	A	2–5	34,019	
17 November 1956	Bolton Wanderers	H	3–0	33,377	
24 November 1956	Leeds United	A	3–3	39,113	
1 December 1956	Sunderland	H	1–1	36,442	
8 December 1956	Luton Town	A	2–1	19,792	
15 December 1956	Cardiff City	A	3–2	11,302	
22 December 1956	Birmingham City	H	4–0	28,644	
25 December 1956	Chelsea	A	1–1	34,094	
26 December 1956	Chelsea	H	2–0	22,526	
29 December 1956	West Bromwich Albion	A	2–0	32,162	
12 January 1957	Portsmouth	H	1–1	48,949	
19 January 1957	Newcastle United	A	1–3	46,815	
2 February 1957	Sheffield Wednesday	H	6–3	40,239	
9 February 1957	Manchester United	A	2–6	61,628	
23 February 1957	Everton	H	2–0	30,582	
9 March 1957	Luton Town	H	1–3	41,288	
13 March 1957	Tottenham Hotspur	A	3–1	64,555	
16 March 1957	Aston Villa	A	0–0	39,893	
20 March 1957	Manchester City	A	3–2	27,974	
23 March 1957	Wolverhampton Wanderers	H	0–0	50,921	
30 March 1957	Bolton Wanderers	A	1–2	23,897	
6 April 1957	Leeds United	H	1–0	40,388	
13 April 1957	Sunderland	A	0–1	34,749	
19 April 1957	Blackpool	H	1–1	50,310	
20 April 1957	Charlton Athletic	H	3–1	26,364	
22 April 1957	Blackpool	A	4–2	24,118	

=== FA Cup ===
Round	Date	Opponent	Venue	Result	Attendance	Goalscorers
R3	5 January 1957	Stoke City	H	4–2	56,173	
R4	26 January 1957	Newport County	A	2–0	22,450	
R5	16 February 1957	Preston North End	A	3–3	39,608	
R5 R	19 February 1957	Preston North End	H	2–1	61,501	
R6	2 March 1957	West Bromwich Albion	A	2–2	58,459	
R6 R	5 March 1957	West Bromwich Albion	H	1–2	63,797	

== Squad ==
Note: Flags indicate national team as defined under FIFA eligibility rules; some limited exceptions apply. Players may hold more than one non-FIFA nationality.

Pos.	Nation	Player
GK	WAL	Jack Kelsey
DF	ENG	Len Wills
DF	SCO	John Snedden
DF	NIR	Billy McCullough
MF	ENG	John Barnwell
MF	SCO	Tommy Docherty
FW	SCO	David Herd
FW	SCO	Jackie Henderson
FW	ENG	Vic Groves
GK	NIR	Jack McClelland
FW	WAL	Mel Charles
FW	ENG	George Eastham
FW	ENG	Geoff Strong
MF	ENG	Danny Clapton
MF	ENG	Alan Skirton

Pos.	Nation	Player
DF	NIR	Terry Neill
DF	ENG	Dave Bacuzzi
FW	ENG	Jimmy Bloomfield
MF	IRL	Joe Haverty
MF	ENG	Gerry Ward
DF	NIR	Eddie Magill
DF	ENG	Mike Everitt
FW	SCO	Peter Kane
DF	ENG	Allan Young
MF	IRL	Frank O'Neill
GK	ENG	Jim Standen
FW	ENG	Dennis Clapton
MF	WAL	Arfon Griffiths
MF	ENG	John Petts
