= 1953–54 Arsenal F.C. season =

English football club season

Arsenal
1953–54 season
- Chairman: Bracewell Smith
- Manager: Tom Whittaker
- First Division: 12th
- FA Cup: Fourth round
Home colours	Away colours

During the 1953–54 English football season, Arsenal F.C. competed in the Football League First Division.

== Final league table ==
Pos	Team	Pld	W	D	L	GF	GA	GAv	Pts
10	Cardiff City	42	18	8	16	51	71	0.718	44
11	Preston North End	42	19	5	18	87	58	1.500	43
12	Arsenal	42	15	13	14	75	73	1.027	43
13	Aston Villa	42	16	9	17	70	68	1.029	41
14	Portsmouth	42	14	11	17	81	89	0.910	39

Source: World Football
Rules for classification: 1) Points; 2) Goal average; 3) Goals scored

== Results ==
Arsenal's score comes first

=== Legend ===
Win	Draw	Loss

=== FA Charity Shield ===
Arsenal entered the FA Charity Shield as 1952-53 League champions, in which they faced FA Cup winners Blackpool.

Date	Opponent	Venue	Result	Attendance	Goalscorers
12 October 1953	Blackpool	H	3–1	39,583	

=== Football League First Division ===
Date	Opponent	Venue	Result	Attendance	Scorers
19 August 1953	West Bromwich Albion	A	0–2	46,812	
22 August 1953	Huddersfield Town	H	0–0	54,847	
24 August 1953	Sheffield United	A	0–1	50,723	
29 August 1953	Aston Villa	A	1–2	33,731	
1 September 1953	Sheffield United	H	1–1	42,077	
5 September 1953	Wolverhampton Wanderers	H	2–3	60,460	
8 September 1953	Chelsea	H	1–2	54,946	
12 September 1953	Sunderland	A	1–7	59,784	
15 September 1953	Chelsea	A	2–0	60,652	
19 September 1953	Manchester City	H	2–2	65,869	
26 September 1953	Cardiff City	A	3–0	49,137	
3 October 1953	Preston North End	H	3–2	61,807	
10 October 1953	Tottenham Hotspur	A	4–1	69,821	
17 October 1953	Burnley	H	2–5	47,353	
24 October 1953	Charlton Athletic	A	5–1	60,259	
31 October 1953	Sheffield Wednesday	H	4–1	52,543	
7 November 1953	Manchester United	A	2–2	29,914	
14 November 1953	Bolton Wanderers	H	4–3	52,319	
21 November 1953	Liverpool	A	2–1	47,814	
28 November 1953	Newcastle United	H	2–1	62,456	
5 December 1953	Middlesbrough	A	0–2	30,085	
12 December 1953	West Bromwich Albion	H	2–2	60,264	
19 December 1953	Huddersfield Town	A	2–2	34,018	
26 December 1953	Blackpool	A	2–2	29,347	
28 December 1953	Blackpool	H	1–1	63,661	
16 January 1954	Wolverhampton Wanderers	A	2–0	45,974	
23 January 1954	Sunderland	H	1–4	60,218	
6 February 1954	Manchester City	A	0–0	39,503	
13 February 1954	Cardiff City	H	1–1	45,497	
24 February 1954	Preston North End	A	1–0	25,633	
27 February 1954	Tottenham Hotspur	H	0–3	64,311	
6 March 1954	Burnley	A	1–2	22,726	
13 March 1954	Charlton Athletic	H	3–3	41,256	
20 March 1954	Sheffield Wednesday	A	1–2	41,194	
27 March 1954	Manchester United	H	3–1	42,735	
3 April 1954	Bolton Wanderers	A	1–3	30,525	
6 April 1954	Aston Villa	H	1–1	14,619	
10 April 1954	Liverpool	H	3–0	33,578	
16 April 1954	Portsmouth	H	3–0	44,948	
17 April 1954	Newcastle United	A	2–5	48,243	
19 April 1954	Portsmouth	A	1–1	30,898	
24 April 1954	Middlesbrough	H	1–2	35,069	

=== FA Cup ===
Round	Date	Opponent	Venue	Result	Attendance	Goalscorers
R3	9 January 1954	Aston Villa	H	5–1	50,990	
R4	30 January 1954	Norwich City	H	1–2	55,767	

== Squad ==
Note: Flags indicate national team as defined under FIFA eligibility rules; some limited exceptions apply. Players may hold more than one non-FIFA nationality.

Pos.	Nation	Player
GK	WAL	Jack Kelsey
DF	ENG	Len Wills
DF	SCO	John Snedden
DF	NIR	Billy McCullough
MF	ENG	John Barnwell
MF	SCO	Tommy Docherty
FW	SCO	David Herd
FW	SCO	Jackie Henderson
FW	ENG	Vic Groves
GK	NIR	Jack McClelland
FW	WAL	Mel Charles
FW	ENG	George Eastham
FW	ENG	Geoff Strong
MF	ENG	Danny Clapton
MF	ENG	Alan Skirton

Pos.	Nation	Player
DF	NIR	Terry Neill
DF	ENG	Dave Bacuzzi
FW	ENG	Jimmy Bloomfield
MF	IRL	Joe Haverty
MF	ENG	Gerry Ward
DF	NIR	Eddie Magill
DF	ENG	Mike Everitt
FW	SCO	Peter Kane
DF	ENG	Allan Young
MF	IRL	Frank O'Neill
GK	ENG	Jim Standen
FW	ENG	Dennis Clapton
MF	WAL	Arfon Griffiths
MF	ENG	John Petts
