= 1954–55 Arsenal F.C. season =

English football club season

Arsenal
1954–55 season
- Chairman: Bracewell Smith
- Manager: Tom Whittaker
- First Division: 9th
- FA Cup: Fourth round
Home colours	Away colours

During the 1954–55 English football season, Arsenal F.C. competed in the Football League First Division.

== Season summary ==
A lacklustre start to the season resulted in three consecutive defeats. This record poor start would last for 67 years, until Mikel Arteta's Arsenal side in the 2021–22 season went on to lose the first three games of the season.

== Final league table ==
Pos	Team	Pld	W	D	L	GF	GA	GAv	Pts
7	Manchester City	42	18	10	14	76	69	1.101	46
8	Newcastle United	42	17	9	16	89	77	1.156	43
9	Arsenal	42	17	9	16	69	63	1.095	43
10	Burnley	42	17	9	16	51	48	1.063	43
11	Everton	42	16	10	16	62	68	0.912	42

Source: World Football
Rules for classification: 1) Points; 2) Goal average; 3) Goals scored

== Results ==
Arsenal's score comes first

=== Legend ===
Win	Draw	Loss

=== Football League First Division ===
Date	Opponent	Venue	Result	Attendance	Scorers
21 August 1954	Newcastle United	H	1–3	65,334	
25 August 1954	Everton	A	0–1	69,034	
28 August 1954	West Bromwich Albion	A	1–3	51,547	
31 August 1954	Everton	H	2–0	42,146	
4 September 1954	Tottenham Hotspur	H	2–0	53,971	
8 September 1954	Manchester City	A	1–2	38,146	
11 September 1954	Sheffield United	H	4–0	41,679	
14 September 1954	Manchester City	H	2–3	33,898	
18 September 1954	Preston North End	A	1–3	35,812	
25 September 1954	Burnley	H	4–0	46,190	
2 October 1954	Leicester City	A	3–3	42,286	
9 October 1954	Sheffield Wednesday	A	2–1	38,635	
16 October 1954	Portsmouth	H	0–1	44,866	
23 October 1954	Aston Villa	A	1–2	38,038	
30 October 1954	Sunderland	H	1–3	65,423	
6 November 1954	Bolton Wanderers	A	2–2	31,223	
13 November 1954	Huddersfield Town	H	3–5	42,950	
20 November 1954	Manchester United	A	1–2	35,230	
27 November 1954	Wolverhampton Wanderers	H	1–1	55,055	
4 December 1954	Blackpool	A	2–2	16,348	
11 December 1954	Charlton Athletic	H	3–1	39,498	
18 December 1954	Newcastle United	A	1–5	35,122	
25 December 1954	Chelsea	H	1–0	47,178	
27 December 1954	Chelsea	A	1–1	65,922	
1 January 1955	West Bromwich Albion	H	2–2	45,246	
15 January 1955	Tottenham Hotspur	A	1–0	36,263	
5 February 1955	Preston North End	H	2–0	41,218	
12 February 1955	Burnley	A	0–3	24,940	
19 February 1955	Leicester City	H	1–1	27,384	
26 February 1955	Bolton Wanderers	H	3–2	27,010	
5 March 1955	Charlton Athletic	A	1–1	48,084	
12 March 1955	Aston Villa	H	2–0	30,136	
19 March 1955	Sunderland	A	1–0	40,279	
26 March 1955	Bolton Wanderers	H	3–0	32,852	
2 April 1955	Huddersfield Town	A	1–0	22,853	
8 April 1955	Cardiff City	H	2–0	39,052	
9 April 1955	Blackpool	H	3–0	59,381	
11 April 1955	Cardiff City	A	2–1	29,080	
16 April 1955	Wolverhampton Wanderers	A	1–3	34,985	
18 April 1955	Sheffield United	A	1–1	21,299	
23 April 1955	Manchester United	H	2–3	42,751	
30 April 1955	Portsmouth	A	1–2	28,156	

=== FA Cup ===
Round	Date	Opponent	Venue	Result	Attendance	Goalscorers
R3	8 January 1955	Cardiff City	H	1–0	51,298	
R4	29 January 1955	Wolverhampton Wanderers	A	0–1	52,857	

== Squad ==
Note: Flags indicate national team as defined under FIFA eligibility rules; some limited exceptions apply. Players may hold more than one non-FIFA nationality.

Pos.	Nation	Player
GK	WAL	Jack Kelsey
DF	ENG	Len Wills
DF	SCO	John Snedden
DF	NIR	Billy McCullough
MF	ENG	John Barnwell
MF	SCO	Tommy Docherty
FW	SCO	David Herd
FW	SCO	Jackie Henderson
FW	ENG	Vic Groves
GK	NIR	Jack McClelland
FW	WAL	Mel Charles
FW	ENG	George Eastham
FW	ENG	Geoff Strong
MF	ENG	Danny Clapton
MF	ENG	Alan Skirton

Pos.	Nation	Player
DF	NIR	Terry Neill
DF	ENG	Dave Bacuzzi
FW	ENG	Jimmy Bloomfield
MF	IRL	Joe Haverty
MF	ENG	Gerry Ward
DF	NIR	Eddie Magill
DF	ENG	Mike Everitt
FW	SCO	Peter Kane
DF	ENG	Allan Young
MF	IRL	Frank O'Neill
GK	ENG	Jim Standen
FW	ENG	Dennis Clapton
MF	WAL	Arfon Griffiths
MF	ENG	John Petts
