= 1958–59 Arsenal F.C. season =

English football club season

Arsenal
1958–59 season
- Chairman: Bracewell Smith
- Manager: George Swindin
- First Division: 3rd
- FA Cup: Fifth round
Home colours	Away colours

During the 1958–59 English football season, Arsenal F.C. competed in the Football League First Division.

== Final league table ==
Pos	Team	Pld	W	D	L	GF	GA	GAv	Pts	Qualification or relegation
1	Wolverhampton Wanderers (C)	42	28	5	9	110	49	2.245	61	Qualification for the European Cup preliminary round
2	Manchester United	42	24	7	11	103	66	1.561	55	
3	Arsenal	42	21	8	13	88	68	1.294	50	
4	Bolton Wanderers	42	20	10	12	79	66	1.197	50	
5	West Bromwich Albion	42	18	13	11	88	68	1.294	49	

Source: World Football
Rules for classification: 1) Points; 2) Goal average; 3) Goals scored
(C) Champions

== Results ==
Arsenal's score comes first

=== Legend ===
Win	Draw	Loss

=== Football League First Division ===
First Division match results
Date	Opponent	Venue	Result F–A	Scorers	Attendance
23 August 1958	Preston North End	A	1–2	Bloomfield	30,588
26 August 1958	Burnley	H	3–0	Bloomfield, Holton, Docherty	41,298
30 August 1958	Leicester City	H	5–1	Holton (2), Evans, Clapton, Nutt	35,497
2 September 1958	Burnley	A	1–3	Groves	28,444
6 September 1958	Everton	A	6–1	Groves, Herd (4), Bloomfield	40,557
9 September 1958	Bolton Wanderers	H	6–1	Herd, Nutt (2), Bloomfield, Clapton, Evans (pen.)	45,276
13 September 1958	Tottenham Hotspur	H	3–1	Nutt, Herd (2)	65,565
17 September 1958	Bolton Wanderers	A	1–2	Bloomfield	42,200
20 September 1958	Manchester City	H	4–1	Herd (2), Evans (pen.), Bloomfield	47,681
27 September 1958	Leeds United	A	1–2	Herd	33,961
4 October 1958	West Bromwich Albion	H	4–3	Henderson (2), Herd, Barlow (o.g.)	59,780
11 October 1958	Manchester United	A	1–1	Ward	56,168
18 October 1958	Wolverhampton Wanderers	H	1–1	Biggs	49,199
22 October 1958	Aston Villa	A	2–1	Ward, Nutt	30,563
25 October 1958	Blackburn Rovers	A	2–4	Evans (pen.), Ward	37,747
1 November 1958	Newcastle United	H	3–2	Groves, Henderson (2)	62,569
8 November 1958	West Ham United	A	0–0		37,871
15 November 1958	Nottingham Forest	H	3–1	Herd, Henderson, McKinlay (o.g.)	48,897
22 November 1958	Chelsea	A	3–0	Henderson, Clapton, Barnwell	57,910
29 November 1958	Blackpool	H	1–4	Clapton	54,629
6 December 1958	Portsmouth	A	1–0	Nutt	32,721
13 December 1958	Aston Villa	H	1–2	Henderson	31,970
20 December 1958	Preston North End	H	1–2	Henderson	32,640
26 December 1958	Luton Town	A	3–6	Julians, Evans (pen.), Bloomfield	21,870
27 December 1958	Luton Town	H	1–0	Bloomfield	56,277
3 January 1959	Leicester City	A	3–2	Julians (2), Bloomfield	33,979
17 January 1959	Everton	H	3–1	Groves (2), Bloomfield	39,272
31 January 1959	Tottenham Hotspur	A	4–1	Groves, Herd, Henderson (2)	60,241
7 February 1959	Manchester City	A	0–0		31,819
21 February 1959	West Bromwich Albion	A	1–1	Julians	42,706
24 February 1959	Leeds United	H	1–0	Herd	30,034
28 February 1959	Manchester United	H	3–2	Barnwell (2), Herd	67,162
7 March 1959	Wolverhampton Wanderers	A	1–6	Haverty	40,480
14 March 1959	Blackburn Rovers	A	1–1	Wills (pen.)	39,955
21 March 1959	Newcastle United	A	0–1		32,774
28 March 1959	West Ham United	H	1–2	Henderson	52,291
4 April 1959	Nottingham Forest	A	1–1	Haverty	32,708
11 April 1959	Chelsea	H	1–1	Ward	40,772
14 April 1959	Birmingham City	A	1–4	Clapton	25,792
18 April 1959	Blackpool	A	2–1	Haverty, Julians	17,118
25 April 1959	Portsmouth	H	5–2	Groves (3), Henderson, Gunter (o.g.)	24,369
4 May 1959	Birmingham City	H	2–1	Clapton, Groves	25,953

=== FA Cup ===
FA Cup match results
Round	Date	Opponent	Venue	Result F–A	Scorers	Attendance
Third round	10 January 1959	Bury	A	1–0	Herd	29,880
Fourth round	24 January 1959	Colchester United	A	2–2	Groves (2)	16,000
Fourth round replay	28 January 1959	Colchester United	H	4–0	Herd (2), Julians, Evans (pen.)	62,686
Fifth round	14 February 1959	Sheffield United	H	2–2	Evans (pen.), Julians	55,407
Fifth round replay	18 February 1959	Sheffield United	A	0–3		48,763

== Squad ==
Note: Flags indicate national team as defined under FIFA eligibility rules; some limited exceptions apply. Players may hold more than one non-FIFA nationality.

Pos.	Nation	Player
GK	WAL	Jack Kelsey
DF	ENG	Len Wills
DF	SCO	John Snedden
DF	NIR	Billy McCullough
MF	ENG	John Barnwell
MF	SCO	Tommy Docherty
FW	SCO	David Herd
FW	SCO	Jackie Henderson
FW	ENG	Vic Groves
GK	NIR	Jack McClelland
FW	WAL	Mel Charles
FW	ENG	George Eastham
FW	ENG	Geoff Strong
MF	ENG	Danny Clapton
MF	ENG	Alan Skirton

Pos.	Nation	Player
DF	NIR	Terry Neill
DF	ENG	Dave Bacuzzi
FW	ENG	Jimmy Bloomfield
MF	IRL	Joe Haverty
MF	ENG	Gerry Ward
DF	NIR	Eddie Magill
DF	ENG	Mike Everitt
FW	SCO	Peter Kane
DF	ENG	Allan Young
MF	IRL	Frank O'Neill
GK	ENG	Jim Standen
FW	ENG	Dennis Clapton
MF	WAL	Arfon Griffiths
MF	ENG	John Petts
