= 1960–61 Arsenal F.C. season =

English football club season

Arsenal
1960–61 season
- Chairman: Bracewell Smith
- Manager: George Swindin
- First Division: 11th
- FA Cup: Third round
- Top goalscorer: League: Herd (29); All: Herd (30)
Home colours	Away colours

During the 1960–61 English football season, Arsenal F.C. competed in the Football League First Division.

== Season summary ==
In the 1960–61 season, the Gunners had a satisfying season where they ended up in 7th place heading into 1961, but a poor run of just four wins in their final 17 games saw Swindin's side end the campaign in a disappointing 11th place and to make things worse for Arsenal supporters, they had to witness their fierce North London rivals Tottenham win the league and cup double.

== Final league table ==
Pos	Team	Pld	W	D	L	GF	GA	GAv	Pts
9	Aston Villa	42	17	9	16	78	77	1.013	43
10	West Bromwich Albion	42	18	5	19	67	71	0.944	41
11	Arsenal	42	15	11	16	77	85	0.906	41
12	Chelsea	42	15	7	20	98	100	0.980	37
13	Manchester City	42	13	11	18	79	90	0.878	37

Source: World Football
Rules for classification: 1) Points; 2) Goal average; 3) Goals scored

== Results ==
Arsenal's score comes first

=== Legend ===
Win	Draw	Loss

=== Football League First Division ===
Date	Opponent	Venue	Result	Attendance	Scorers
20 August 1960	Burnley	A	2–3	23,653	Bloomfield, Herd
23 August 1960	Preston North End	H	1–0	31,612	Everitt
27 August 1960	Nottingham Forest	H	3–0	28,878	Henderson, Skirton (2)
30 August 1960	Preston North End	A	0–2	20,105	
3 September 1960	Manchester City	A	0–0	36,656	
6 September 1960	Birmingham City	H	2–0	20,285	Herd, Kane
10 September 1960	Tottenham Hotspur	H	2–3	59,868	Herd, Ward
14 September 1960	Birmingham City	A	0–2	22,904	
17 September 1960	Newcastle United	H	5–0	34,885	Clapton, Herd (3), Strong
24 September 1960	Cardiff City	A	0–1	35,000	
1 October 1960	West Bromwich Albion	H	1–0	27,176	Herd
8 October 1960	Leicester City	A	1–2	22,501	Henderson
15 October 1960	Aston Villa	H	2–1	34,048	Herd, Strong
22 October 1960	Blackburn Rovers	A	4–2	21,500	Charles, Herd, Strong (2)
29 October 1960	Manchester United	H	2–1	45,715	Barnwell, Herd
5 November 1960	West Ham United	A	0–6	29,275	
12 November 1960	Chelsea	H	1–4	38,666	Charles
19 November 1960	Blackpool	A	1–1	15,417	Herd
26 November 1960	Everton	H	3–2	36,709	Herd (3)
3 December 1960	Wolverhampton Wanderers	A	3–5	25,658	Barnwell, Herd (2)
10 December 1960	Bolton Wanderers	H	5–1	30,818	Barnwell, Eastham (2), Strong (2)
17 December 1960	Burnley	H	2–5	37,209	Herd, Strong
23 December 1960	Sheffield Wednesday	A	1–1	29,311	Neill
26 December 1960	Sheffield Wednesday	H	1–1	43,555	Eastham
31 December 1960	Nottingham Forest	A	5–3	30,735	Eastham, Henderson, Herd (3)
14 January 1961	Manchester City	H	5–4	36,440	Clapton, Henderson, Herd (3)
21 January 1961	Tottenham Hotspur	A	2–4	65,251	Haverty, Henderson
4 February 1961	Newcastle United	A	3–3	34,394	Eastham, Strong (2)
11 February 1961	Cardiff City	H	2–3	33,754	Herd (2)
18 February 1961	West Bromwich Albion	A	3–2	21,500	Haverty (2), Skirton
25 February 1961	Leicester City	H	1–3	31,721	Henderson
4 March 1961	Aston Villa	A	2–2	35,000	Barnwell, Haverty
11 March 1961	Blackburn Rovers	H	0–0	34,250	
18 March 1961	Manchester United	A	1–1	29,732	Charles
25 March 1961	West Ham United	H	0–0	27,505	
31 March 1961	Fulham	A	2–2	35,476	Herd (2)
1 April 1961	Bolton Wanderers	A	1–1	18,618	Henderson
3 April 1961	Fulham	H	4–2	20,142	Barnwell (2), Henderson (2)
8 April 1961	Blackpool	H	1–0	36,301	Herd
15 April 1961	Chelsea	A	1–3	38,223	Strong
22 April 1961	Wolverhampton Wanderers	H	1–5	34,429	Henderson
29 April 1961	Everton	A	1–4	39,810	Herd

=== FA Cup ===
Round	Date	Opponent	Venue	Result	Attendance	Goalscorers
R3	7 January 1961	Sunderland	A	1–2	58,575	Herd 6'

== Squad ==
Note: Flags indicate national team as defined under FIFA eligibility rules; some limited exceptions apply. Players may hold more than one non-FIFA nationality.

Pos.	Nation	Player
GK	WAL	Jack Kelsey
DF	ENG	Len Wills
DF	SCO	John Snedden
DF	NIR	Billy McCullough
MF	ENG	John Barnwell
MF	SCO	Tommy Docherty
FW	SCO	David Herd
FW	SCO	Jackie Henderson
FW	ENG	Vic Groves
GK	NIR	Jack McClelland
FW	WAL	Mel Charles
FW	ENG	George Eastham
FW	ENG	Geoff Strong
MF	ENG	Danny Clapton
MF	ENG	Alan Skirton

Pos.	Nation	Player
DF	NIR	Terry Neill
DF	ENG	Dave Bacuzzi
FW	ENG	Jimmy Bloomfield
MF	IRL	Joe Haverty
MF	ENG	Gerry Ward
DF	NIR	Eddie Magill
DF	ENG	Mike Everitt
FW	SCO	Peter Kane
DF	ENG	Allan Young
MF	IRL	Frank O'Neill
GK	ENG	Jim Standen
FW	ENG	Dennis Clapton
MF	WAL	Arfon Griffiths
MF	ENG	John Petts
