= 1959–60 Arsenal F.C. season =

English football club season

Arsenal
1959–60 season
- Chairman: Bracewell Smith
- Manager: George Swindin
- First Division: 13th
- FA Cup: Third round
- Top goalscorer: League: Herd (29); All: Herd (30)
- Average home league attendance: 34,318
Home colours	Away colours

During the 1959–60 English football season, Arsenal F.C. competed in the Football League First Division.

== Final league table ==
Pos	Team	Pld	W	D	L	GF	GA	GAv	Pts
11	Blackpool	42	15	10	17	59	71	0.831	40
12	Leicester City	42	13	13	16	66	75	0.880	39
13	Arsenal	42	15	9	18	68	80	0.850	39
14	West Ham United	42	16	6	20	75	91	0.824	38
15	Everton	42	13	11	18	73	78	0.936	37

Source: World Football
Rules for classification: 1) Points; 2) Goal average; 3) Goals scored

== Results ==
Arsenal's score comes first

=== Legend ===
Win	Draw	Loss

=== Football League First Division ===
Date	Opponent	Venue	Result	Attendance	Scorers
22 August 1959	Sheffield Wednesday	H	0–1	47,585	
26 August 1959	Nottingham Forest	A	3–0	32,386	Danny Clapton 4', 59', 88'
29 August 1959	Wolverhampton Wanderers	A	3–3	45,885	David Herd 52', 68'Danny Clapton 83'
1 September 1959	Nottingham Forest	H	1–1	41,585	David Herd 45'
5 September 1959	Tottenham Hotspur	H	1–1	61,011	John Barnwell 90'
9 September 1959	Bolton Wanderers	A	1–0	32,571	David Herd 64'
12 September 1959	Manchester City	H	3–1	38,392	Danny Clapton 33' John Barnwell 44' Joe Haverty 78'
15 September 1959	Bolton Wanderers	H	2–1	38,795	David Herd 19' Danny Clapton 78'
19 September 1959	Blackburn Rovers	A	1–1	31,800	David Herd 47'
26 September 1959	Blackpool	H	2–1	47,473	John Barnwell 38' David Herd 71'
3 October 1959	Everton	A	1–3	40,587	John Barnwell 38'
10 October 1959	Manchester United	A	2–4	51,872	Jackie Henderson 14' David Herd 42'
17 October 1959	Preston North End	H	0–3	44,073	
24 October 1959	Leicester City	A	2–2	29,152	John Barnwell 52' Jimmy Bloomfield 64'
31 October 1959	Birmingham City	H	3–0	34,605	John Barnwell 3' David Herd 30' Jackie Henderson 65'
7 November 1959	Leeds United	A	2–3	21,500	David Herd 44' Jackie Henderson 62'
14 November 1959	West Ham United	H	1–3	49,760	Jimmy Bloomfield 5'
21 November 1959	Chelsea	A	3–1	52,748	Joe Haverty 9', 28' Jimmy Bloomfield 12'
28 November 1959	West Bromwich Albion	H	2–4	41,157	Vic Groves 2' Jimmy Bloomfield 61'
5 December 1959	Newcastle United	A	1–4	40,031	Joe Haverty 27'
12 December 1959	Burnley	H	2–4	26,249	Joe Haverty 39' Jimmy Bloomfield 43'
19 December 1959	Sheffield Wednesday	A	1–5	25,135	Len Julians 16'
26 December 1959	Luton Town	H	0–3	31,331	
28 December 1959	Luton Town	A	1–0	27,055	Len Julians 45'
2 January 1960	Wolverhampton Wanderers	H	4–4	47,854	Dennis Evans 32' Joe Haverty 41' Mel Charles 47' Len Wills 89' (pen.)
16 January 1960	Tottenham Hotspur	A	0–3	58,962	
23 January 1960	Manchester City	A	2–1	28,441	Kenneth Barnes 36' (own goal) Mel Charles 79'
6 February 1960	Blackburn Rovers	H	5–2	35,633	Mel Charles (3), Joe Haverty, David Herd
13 February 1960	Blackpool	A	1–2	14,868	Mel Charles
20 February 1960	Everton	H	2–1	28,872	Mel Charles (2)
27 February 1960	Newcastle United	H	1–0	47,657	John Barnwell (pen.)
5 March 1960	Preston North End	A	3–0	23,635	Jackie Henderson, Joe Haverty, Jimmy Bloomfield
15 March 1960	Leicester City	H	1–1	27,838	David Herd
19 March 1960	Burnley	A	2–3	20,166	Jackie Henderson (2)
26 March 1960	Leeds United	H	1–1	19,735	David Herd
2 April 1960	West Ham United	A	0–0	29,000	
9 April 1960	Chelsea	H	1–4	40,525	Jimmy Bloomfield
15 April 1960	Fulham	H	2–0	37,873	Jackie Henderson, David Herd
16 April 1960	Birmingham City	A	0–3	27,216	
18 April 1960	Fulham	A	0–3	31,058	
23 April 1960	Manchester United	H	5–2	41,057	Danny Clapton 7' Jimmy Bloomfield 16', 67', 79' Gerry Ward 88'
30 April 1960	West Bromwich Albion	A	0–1	30,480	

=== FA Cup ===
Round	Date	Opponent	Venue	Result	Attendance	Goalscorers
R3	9 January 1960	Rotherham United	A	2–2	24,750	
R3 R	13 January 1960	Rotherham United	H	1–1	57,598	
R3 2R	18 January 1960	Rotherham United	N	0–2	56,290	

== Squad ==
Note: Flags indicate national team as defined under FIFA eligibility rules; some limited exceptions apply. Players may hold more than one non-FIFA nationality.

Pos.	Nation	Player
GK	WAL	Jack Kelsey
DF	ENG	Len Wills
DF	SCO	John Snedden
DF	NIR	Billy McCullough
MF	ENG	John Barnwell
MF	SCO	Tommy Docherty
FW	SCO	David Herd
FW	SCO	Jackie Henderson
FW	ENG	Vic Groves
GK	NIR	Jack McClelland
FW	WAL	Mel Charles
FW	ENG	George Eastham
FW	ENG	Geoff Strong
MF	ENG	Danny Clapton
MF	ENG	Alan Skirton

Pos.	Nation	Player
DF	NIR	Terry Neill
DF	ENG	Dave Bacuzzi
FW	ENG	Jimmy Bloomfield
MF	IRL	Joe Haverty
MF	ENG	Gerry Ward
DF	NIR	Eddie Magill
DF	ENG	Mike Everitt
FW	SCO	Peter Kane
DF	ENG	Allan Young
MF	IRL	Frank O'Neill
GK	ENG	Jim Standen
FW	ENG	Dennis Clapton
MF	WAL	Arfon Griffiths
MF	ENG	John Petts
