= Petts =

Petts is a surname and may be:

- John Petts (artist) (1914–1991), Welsh artist
- John Petts (footballer), English football player and manager
- Judith Petts, British academic
- Kusha Petts (1921–2003), British artist
- Paul Petts (born 1950s), English professional footballer
- Valerie Petts, English watercolourist

== See also ==
- Pett
- Petts Wood
