= John Petts =

John Petts may refer to:

- John Petts (artist) (1914–1991), Welsh artist
- John Petts (footballer), English football player and manager
