= Joe Wade (footballer) =

English footballer & manager (1921–2005)

Personal information
- Full name: Joseph Samuel Wade
- Date of birth: 7 July 1921
- Place of birth: Shoreditch, England
- Date of death: 12 November 2005 (aged 84)
- Position: Defender

Senior career*
Years	Team	Apps	(Gls)
1946–1955	Arsenal	86	(0)

Managerial career
- 1958–1962: Hereford United
- * Club domestic league appearances and goals

Joseph Samuel Wade (7 July 1921 – 12 November 2005) was an English footballer and manager.

Wade was born in Shoreditch, London and joined Arsenal as an amateur in 1944. Wade was serving in the Royal Air Force during World War II; stationed at RAF Credenhill in Herefordshire, he guested a few times for Southern League side Hereford United during this period as well.

Wade was a reserve full back and only played in a handful of matches during the 1940s; he made his debut in an FA Cup match against West Ham United on 5 January 1946; a mainly reserve Arsenal side were thrashed 6–0, which remains to this day Arsenal's worst FA Cup defeat in modern times. Wade continued to be a bit-part player; he made his league debut in a 4–2 win over Leeds United on 16 November 1946, but in all he only made sixteen appearances between 1946 and 1952; the likes of Walley Barnes and Laurie Scott keeping him out of the side. Arsenal won the old First Division in 1947-48 but he only made three league appearances all season.

Barnes had badly injured his knee in the 1952 FA Cup Final, and Wade duly filled in for him for the whole of the 1952-53 season. Wade was a near ever-present and played 44 times as Arsenal won their seventh league title, pipping Preston North End on goal average; it would turn out to be their last trophy until 1970. However, the following season, 1953-54, Wade himself injured his knee in a floodlit friendly against Queens Park Rangers and after recovering, he struggled to take his place back off Len Wills and a now-recovered Barnes. He continued to flit in and out of the first team but spent all of the 1955-56 season in the reserve side, at the same time carrying out a role as coach of the Arsenal youth team.

In spring 1956 he left Arsenal to return to non-league Hereford United as player-manager. He played 91 first-team matches for Arsenal in total, never scoring a goal. At Hereford, he started the club's long-running tradition for knocking League sides out of the FA Cup, including Aldershot in 1956-57 and Queens Park Rangers in 1957-58. Wade won the "Double" of Southern League Cup and Southern League North-West Division in 1958-59, before leaving in 1962 to concentrate on his sports shop business.

Wade briefly returned as Hereford's caretaker manager after John Charles had quit in 1971, but apart from that he did not return to football management. He died in 2005, at the age of 84.

== Honours ==
- First Division: 1952-53
