= Arthur Milton =

English cricketer and footballer

Personal information
- Full name: Clement Arthur Milton
- Born: 10 March 1928; Bedminster, Bristol, England
- Died: 25 April 2007 (aged 79); Bristol, England
- Batting: Right-handed
- Bowling: Right-arm medium

International information
- National side: England
- Test debut: 3 July 1958 v New Zealand
- Last Test: 18 June 1959 v India

Career statistics
Competition	Test	First-class
Matches	6	620
Runs scored	204	32,150
Batting average	25.50	33.73
100s/50s	1/0	56/160
Top score	104*	170
Balls bowled	24	8,414
Wickets	0	79
Bowling average	–	46.07
5 wickets in innings	–	1
10 wickets in match	–	0
Best bowling	–	5/64
Catches/stumpings	5/–	760/–
- Source: ESPNcricinfo, 7 November 2022
Association football career
- Height: 5 ft 8 1/2 in (1.74 m)
- Position: Outside right
Youth career
- 1946–1951: Arsenal
Senior career*
Years	Team	Apps	(Gls)
1951–1955	Arsenal	75	(18)
1955	Bristol City	14	(3)
International career
1951	England	1	(0)
- * Club domestic league appearances and goals

Clement Arthur Milton (10 March 1928 – 25 April 2007) was an English cricketer and footballer; he was a double international. He played County cricket for Gloucestershire from 1948 to 1974, playing six Test matches for England in 1958 and 1959. He also played domestic football for Arsenal between 1951 and 1955, and then for a brief period for Bristol City. He played one match for England in 1951, against Austria at Wembley. He was the last man, and the last survivor, of the twelve people to have played at the highest international level for both England's football and cricket teams.

The cricket writer, Colin Bateman, described Milton as a, "stylish, relaxed run-maker".

== Early life ==
Milton was born in Bedminster, in Bristol, and was educated at Cotham Grammar School also in Bristol. A natural sportsman, he became School Captain of cricket, football and rugby union. He also showed talent at mathematics, but decided to pursue sporting glory rather than attend university.

== Cricket career ==
Milton played for Stapleton Cricket Club as an all-rounder, and then started to play for Gloucestershire Second XI. He made his first-class debut for Gloucestershire in June 1948, against Northants. He went on to play county cricket in 585 matches over 26 years, until he retired in 1974.

Milton was 12th man in the Ashes series against Australia in 1953, and was named as 12th man again for the first Test against South Africa in 1955 (although he was forced to withdraw through injury). He played six Tests for England between 1958 and 1959. He made his Test debut in the third Test against New Zealand on 3 July 1958 at Headingley. He opened the batting with MJK Smith (another double international, at cricket and rugby), scoring 104 not out. He was the first Gloucestershire player to score a century on his England Test debut since W.G. Grace. He was also the first England player to remain on the playing field the whole of a Test match: he fielded throughout New Zealand's first innings, then opened the batting for England and ended undefeated, and fielded again through New Zealand's second innings, as England won by an innings and 71 runs. He lost his place for the fourth Test, but returned for the fifth Test at the Oval. He was one of the Wisden Cricketers of the Year in 1959.

Milton was part of the England side that toured Australia that winter, playing in the first Test at Sydney and the third Test at Melbourne, but he struggled, and returned home with an injured finger. He played in the first two Tests against India in 1959, ending his short Test career in the second Test at Lord's that June.

Milton never played Test cricket again, but he continued to achieve success in county cricket. In all, he took 79 first-class wickets with his right-arm medium pace bowling, and his football fitness and quick reflexes also made him a notably fast runner in the field, taking 758 catches, but he was mainly a prolific opening batsman from 1951, noted for his running between the wickets. He scored over 32,000 first-class runs at the relatively low batting average of 33.66 runs, passing 1,000 runs in 16 seasons. He played 1,017 innings for Gloucestershire, a record for the county. Perhaps his best season was 1967, when, aged 39, he scored seven centuries and passed 2,000 runs. He was Gloucestershire captain in 1968.

He was a coach at the University of Oxford after his retirement.

== Football career ==
He joined Arsenal as an amateur in April 1945, turning professional the next year. National Service meant Milton had to break his football career for two years between 1946 and 1948, but he returned to Arsenal afterwards and continued to play in Arsenal's reserve side. He made his first-team debut against Aston Villa on his twenty third birthday, 10 March 1951. He went on to become a regular for Arsenal at right half and outside-right.

After making only twelve League appearances, Milton was called up for England, and won his first and only cap, in a 2–2 draw against Austria on 28 November 1951. Milton went on to win the First Division title with Arsenal in 1952–53, but soon after faced competition for his place from Danny Clapton and Derek Tapscott.

In all, Milton played 84 matches for Arsenal, scoring 21 goals. After only being a bit-part player for two seasons, he moved to Bristol City in February 1955 for a transfer fee of £4,000. He helped them win promotion to Division Two. After 15 matches at Bristol City, he retired from football altogether in the summer of 1955 to concentrate on his cricket career.

== Personal life, retirement and death ==
He married Joan, the daughter of his first landlady as a young recruit at Arsenal. After his sporting career ended, Milton became a postman in Bristol, where he was a big fan of greyhound racing. He also played golf, off a handicap of four, and snooker and billiards.

He received an honorary MA from Bristol University in 2002. He died at the age of 79 in hospital, shortly after suffering a heart attack in his house in Bristol on the morning of 25 April 2007. He was survived by his wife and their three sons.

== Honours ==
- First Division: 1952–53
