= Paul Petts =

English footballer (1961–2025)

Personal information
- Full name: Paul Andrew Petts
- Date of birth: 27 September 1961
- Place of birth: Hackney, England
- Date of death: 24 March 2025 (aged 63)
- Place of death: Swansea, Wales
- Height: 5 ft 9 in (1.75 m)
- Position: Winger

Youth career
- 19xx–1978: Bristol Rovers

Senior career*
| Years | Team | Apps | (Gls) |
| 1978–1980 | Bristol Rovers | 13 | (0) |
| 1980–1985 | Shrewsbury Town | 149 | (16) |
- Merthyr Tydfil
| Total | | 162 | (16) |

International career
| 1979 | England Youth | 1 | (0) |
- * Club domestic league appearances and goals

Paul Andrew Petts (27 September 1961 – 24 March 2025) was an English professional footballer who played as a winger.

== Career ==
Petts began his career with Bristol Rovers, making 13 appearances in the Football League for them between 1978 and 1980. He then played for Shrewsbury Town, making a further 149 appearances in the league over five seasons. Petts later played in Wales for Merthyr Tydfil.

== Death ==
Petts died from cancer on 24 March 2025, at the age of 63. He was survived by his father John, also a professional footballer.
