= Billy McCullough =

Northern Irish footballer (1935–2026)

Personal information
- Full name: William James McCullough
- Date of birth: 27 July 1935
- Place of birth: Carrickfergus, Northern Ireland
- Date of death: March 2026 (aged 90)
- Height: 5 ft 11 in (1.80 m)
- Position: Left-back

Senior career*
Years	Team	Apps	(Gls)
–1958	Portadown		
1958–1966	Arsenal	253	(4)
1966–1967	Millwall	19	(0)
- Derry City

International career
1961–1966	Northern Ireland	10	(0)
- * Club domestic league appearances and goals

William James McCullough (27 July 1935 – March 2026) was a Northern Irish footballer who made more than 250 appearances for Arsenal in the Football League and was capped 10 times for Northern Ireland.

== Career ==
Born in Carrickfergus, McCullough first played for Portadown, before being signed in 1958 for £5,000 by London club Arsenal. A left-back, he soon made his debut for the club, against Luton Town on 26 December 1958. He only played ten matches that season, but after Len Wills was moved to right back at the start of 1959–60, McCullough became Arsenal's' regular left back.

McCullough became known for his consistency and fitness – he wore the No. 3 shirt for Arsenal for the next six seasons, missing only a handful of matches. Although Arsenal had reached third place in his first season at the club, for the rest of his career in the side the club dwelled in mid-table and never challenged for honours.

McCullough won his first cap for Northern Ireland in a friendly against Italy on 25 April 1961, which Northern Ireland lost 3-2. He went on to appear ten times for his country, scoring no goals, with his final cap coming against England in a 2-0 defeat on 22 October 1966.

By 1965–66, McCullough had competition for his place, in the shape of the young Peter Storey. When Bertie Mee took over at Arsenal at the end of that season, looking to build a young side, he transfer listed the 31-year-old McCullough during the close season. He had played 268 matches in total for Arsenal, scoring 5 goals. He was sold to Millwall in August 1966, and later had spells at Bedford Town, Cork Celtic and Derry City.

== Death ==
On 13 March 2026, it was announced that McCullough had died at the age of 90.

== Career statistics ==
Appearances and goals by club, season and competition
Club	Season	League			FA Cup		Europe		Total	
Club	Season	Division	Apps	Goals	Apps	Goals	Apps	Goals	Apps	Goals
Arsenal	1958–59	First Division	10	0	1	0	—		11	0
Arsenal	1959–60	First Division	33	0	0	0	—		33	0
Arsenal	1960–61	First Division	41	0	1	0	—		42	0
Arsenal	1961–62	First Division	40	0	2	0	—		42	0
Arsenal	1962–63	First Division	42	3	3	0	—		45	3
Arsenal	1963–64	First Division	40	1	4	0	4 (Note: Appearances in Inter-Cities Fairs Cup)	1	48	2
Arsenal	1964–65	First Division	30	0	0	0	—		30	0
Arsenal	1965–66	First Division	17	0	0	0	—		17	0
Career total			253	4	11	0	4	1	268	5
