= Danny Clapton =

English footballer (1934–1986)

Personal information
- Full name: Daniel Robert Clapton
- Date of birth: 22 July 1934
- Place of birth: Stepney, London, England
- Date of death: 16 June 1986 (aged 51)
- Position: Winger

Senior career*
Years	Team	Apps	(Gls)
1949–1953	Leytonstone		
1953–1962	Arsenal	207	(25)
1962–1963	Luton Town	10	(0)
1963–1970	Corinthians (Sydney)		

International career
1958	England	1	(0)
- * Club domestic league appearances and goals

Daniel Robert Clapton (22 July 1934 – 16 June 1986) was an English footballer.

Born in Stepney, London, Clapton first started out as an amateur with Leytonstone before joining Arsenal in August 1953. He made his debut in a 1–0 win over Chelsea on 25 December 1954, and by the end of the 1954–55 he was Arsenal's first choice right-winger, taking Arthur Milton's place. He became a near ever-present for Arsenal for the next four seasons (aside from 1957–58, where he was out injured for a third of the season), helping Arsenal to third place in 1958–59, their highest league position in six years.

Clapton was also called up for England, playing a solitary international match against Wales on 26 November 1958 at Villa Park, which finished 2-2. Arsenal played a friendly match later that day against Juventus at Highbury, and Clapton played in that match as well, alongside teammate Jack Kelsey, who earlier in the day had been in goal for Wales.

After Arsenal signed Jackie Henderson and Alan Skirton, Clapton had to be content with sharing the right wing position in 1959–60 and 1960–61. Arsenal then signed Johnny MacLeod in the summer of 1961, and Clapton lost his place in the side altogether (only playing five matches in 1961–62) and was sold to Luton Town in September 1962. In all he played 225 matches for Arsenal, scoring 27 goals.

Clapton's spell at Luton was uneventful; he later moved to Australia to play for Sydney side Corinthians. He returned to England in 1970 and later ran a pub in Hackney. His younger brother Denis was also a footballer, but never achieved the same success, making only five league appearances for Arsenal and Northampton Town. He died aged 51, in 1986.
