= Mike Everitt (footballer) =

English former footballer and manager

Personal information
- Full name: Michael Dennis Everitt
- Date of birth: 16 January 1941 (age 85)
- Place of birth: Clacton-on-Sea, England
- Position: Left back

Youth career
- 1956–1958: Arsenal

Senior career*
Years	Team	Apps	(Gls)
1958–1961	Arsenal	9	(1)
1961–1967	Northampton Town	207	(15)
1967–1968	Plymouth Argyle	29	(0)
1968–1970	Brighton & Hove Albion	27	(1)
1970–1971	Plymouth City		
1971–1973	Wimbledon	33	(1)
Total		305	(18)

Managerial career
- 1970–1971: Plymouth City (player-manager)
- 1971–1973: Wimbledon (player-manager)
- 1973–1975: Brentford
- Al-Shabab
- El Mokawloon
- Al Ahly
- * Club domestic league appearances and goals

Michael Dennis Everitt (born 16 January 1941) is an English former professional football player and manager. As a left back, Everitt made over 200 appearances in the Football League for Northampton Town and he later managed in the Football League, Africa and the Middle East.

== Playing career ==
=== Arsenal ===
A left back, Everitt began his career in the youth system at First Division club Arsenal and turned professional in February 1958. He made his professional debut in a 2–0 victory over Fulham on 15 April 1960 and scored his only goal for the club with the winner versus Preston North End on 23 August 1960. He made just 9 appearances for the Gunners and departed Highbury in February 1961.

=== Northampton Town ===
Everitt dropped down to the Fourth Division to join high-flying Northampton Town for a £4,000 fee in February 1961. He helped the club to clinch promotion to the Third Division at the end of the 1960–61 season and was a part of the team that clinched two further promotions to secure First Division football for the first time in the club's history in 1965. The Cobblers' stay in the top flight was fleeting and with a second-successive relegation looking likely, Everitt left the County Ground in March 1967. In just over six years with Northampton, Everitt made 207 league appearances and scored 15 goals. For his contribution, Everitt was later named in the Northampton Town 'Team of the Century'.

=== Later years ===
Everitt joined Second Division club Plymouth Argyle in March 1967, but made just 31 appearances during just over a year at Home Park, before ending his League career with a two-season spell at Third Division club Brighton & Hove Albion. In 1970, Everitt dropped into non-League football to end his career with Plymouth City and Wimbledon before retiring in 1973.

== Managerial and coaching career ==
Everitt began his managerial career as player-manager of Plymouth City in 1970, but his tenure was ended when the club folded midway through the 1971–72 season. He took over from long-serving Les Henley at Southern League Premier Division club Wimbledon in April 1971, but was unable to achieve better than two mid-table finishes before surprisingly moving up to the Football League when he was appointed as manager of newly relegated Fourth Division club Brentford in August 1973. Everitt narrowly avoided a finish in the re-election places at the end of the 1973–74 season, but was sacked by incoming chairman Dan Tana in January 1975. After a spell coaching at Leicester City, Everitt moved abroad and managed clubs in Egypt, Kuwait and Morocco. He had particular success with El Mokawloon, winning the 1982–83 Egyptian Premier League title and two African Cup Winners' Cups.

== Honours ==
=== As a player ===
Northampton Town

- Football League Second Division second-place promotion (1): 1964–65
- Football League Third Division (1): 1962–63
- Football League Fourth Division third-place promotion (1): 1960–61

=== As a manager ===
El Mokawloon

- Egyptian Premier League (1): 1982–83
- African Cup Winners' Cup (2): 1982, 1983

== Career statistics ==
Appearances and goals by club, season and competition
Club	Season	League			FA Cup		League Cup		Total	
Club	Season	Division	Apps	Goals	Apps	Goals	Apps	Goals	Apps	Goals
Arsenal	1959–60	First Division	5	0	0	0	—		5	0
Arsenal	1960–61	First Division	4	1	0	0	0	0	4	1
Arsenal	Total		9	1	0	0	0	0	9	1
Plymouth Argyle	1966–67	Second Division	9	0	—		—		9	0
Plymouth Argyle	1967–68	Second Division	20	0	1	0	1	0	22	0
Plymouth Argyle	Total		29	0	1	0	1	0	31	0
Career total			38	1	1	0	1	0	40	1
