= Allan Young =

English footballer (1941–2009)

Personal information
- Full name: Allan Robert Young
- Date of birth: 20 January 1941
- Place of birth: Hornsey, England
- Date of death: 8 December 2009 (aged 68)
- Height: 6 ft 0 in (1.83 m)
- Position: Centre half

Senior career*
Years	Team	Apps	(Gls)
1960–1961	Arsenal	4	(0)
1961–1968	Chelsea	20	(0)
1968–1972	Torquay United	60	(1)
1972–1973	Wimbledon	9	(0)
Total		93	(1)
- * Club domestic league appearances and goals

Allan Robert Young (20 January 1941 – 8 December 2009) was an English professional footballer, playing mainly as a central defender.

== Career ==
Young began his career as a junior with Arsenal, turning professional in April 1959. His first league match was on 26 December 1960, a 1–1 draw at Highbury against Sheffield Wednesday, with Young taking the place of the regular number five, John Snedden. Between 21 January and 11 February 1961, Young played a further three league games consecutively; a 4–2 defeat at White Hart Lane against bitter rivals (and eventual Double winners) Tottenham Hotspur, a 3–3 draw at St James' Park against Newcastle United and a 3–2 defeat at Highbury against Cardiff City.

After being in a team that conceded ten goals in three games, Young never played for Arsenal again, and joined Chelsea in November 1961 for a fee of £6,000. He remained at Stamford Bridge for over seven years, but played in only 20 league games, never scoring, though he did play in their League Cup final win over Leicester City in 1965. In January 1969, he finally left Chelsea, joining Torquay United for a fee of £8,000. After 60 league games (one goal) for Torquay he retired from professional football.

== Death ==
In 2009, he was diagnosed with dementia and had been put into a care home. He died on 8 December 2009.

== Honours ==
Chelsea

- Football League Cup: 1964–65
