= Denis Clapton =

English footballer

Personal information
- Date of birth: 12 October 1939 (age 87)
- Place of birth: Hackney, England
- Position: Forward

Senior career*
| Years | Team | Apps | (Gls) |
| 1959–1961 | Arsenal | 4 | (0) |
| 1961–1962 | Northampton Town | 1 | (0) |
- Wisbech Town
- * Club domestic league appearances and goals

Denis Clapton (born 12 October 1939) is an English former footballer who played in the Football League for Arsenal and Northampton Town. His brother Danny was also a professional footballer.
