= Terry Neill =

Northern Irish football player and manager (1942–2022)

- Neill with Arsenal in 1964

Personal information
- Full name: William John Terence Neill
- Date of birth: 8 May 1942
- Place of birth: Belfast, Northern Ireland
- Date of death: 28 July 2022 (aged 80)
- Position: Centre-back

Youth career
- Bangor
- 1959–1960: Arsenal

Senior career*
Years	Team	Apps	(Gls)
1960–1970	Arsenal	241	(8)
1970–1973	Hull City	103	(4)
Total		344	(12)

International career
1961–1973	Northern Ireland	59	(2)

Managerial career
- 1970–1974: Hull City
- 1971–1974: Northern Ireland
- 1974–1976: Tottenham Hotspur
- 1976–1983: Arsenal
- * Club domestic league appearances and goals

William John Terence Neill (8 May 1942 – 28 July 2022) was a Northern Irish football player and manager. A centre-back, he captained and later managed Arsenal, guiding the club to a European final in 1980 and three consecutive FA Cup finals between 1978 and 1980, winning a dramatic final against Manchester United in 1979. Before his seven-year spell as manager of Arsenal, he managed Hull City, Tottenham Hotspur, and Northern Ireland.

== Playing career ==
Born in Belfast, Neill played as a youth for Bangor, before moving in December 1959 to Arsenal. He spent a year in Arsenal's youth side, before making his debut against Sheffield Wednesday on 23 December 1960, aged eighteen. At first, he played sporadically during the early 1960s, getting between 10 and 20 games a season through the first half of the decade, though on one occasion he became the youngest Arsenal captain in the club's history at 20 years of age.

Playing either at centre-half or wing-half, Neill established himself in the side in 1964–65, with 29 league appearances, and as one of the younger members of Billy Wright's team, was kept by Wright's successor Bertie Mee when he took over in 1966. Neill became a first-choice player through the mid-sixties, playing over 40 games a season for three consecutive seasons, and also playing in the 1968 Football League Cup Final against Leeds United, which Arsenal lost. Neill played no part in Arsenal's European Fairs Cup 1969–70 final win but he made five appearances earlier in the cup run.

During this time, Neill had also become a regular for Northern Ireland, having made his debut as far back as 1961. He became captain of his country in 1968, but a bout of jaundice restricted his appearances for club and country in 1968–69 and he missed the 1969 Football League Cup Final, which Arsenal lost to Swindon Town. Unable to regain his first-team place, Neill only made 25 appearances in 1969–70 and it became clear that he was surplus to requirements at Arsenal. In total he played 275 times for Arsenal, scoring ten goals.

== Managerial career ==
Although still only 28, Neill was signed by Hull City in July 1970 as player-manager, one of the youngest ever managers in the history of the game; he later became player-manager of his country as well. Neill retired from playing in 1973, by which time he had won 59 caps for Northern Ireland, breaking Danny Blanchflower's record (although Pat Jennings would go on to break Neill's record in due course).

Neill left Hull a year later to succeed Bill Nicholson as manager of Arsenal's fiercest rivals, Tottenham Hotspur. He managed Spurs for two seasons, narrowly avoiding relegation in his first term.

Having improved Tottenham Hotspur's fortunes with a 9th-place finish in his second season in charge, Neill was recruited by the Arsenal board to replace Bertie Mee on 9 July 1976 and at the age of 34 he became the youngest Arsenal manager to date. With new signings like Malcolm Macdonald and Pat Jennings, and a crop of talent in the side such as Liam Brady and Frank Stapleton, the club enjoyed their best form since the 1971 double, reaching a trio of FA Cup finals (1978, 1979 and 1980).

Arsenal lost the other two FA Cup finals that Neill guided the club to, but were victorious in the 1979 final, with the Gunners winning 3–2 against Manchester United in one of the most exhilarating endings to an FA Cup final in history. In the 86th minute, Arsenal were leading 2–0. United scored two late goals to equalise. With the game poised for extra time, Alan Sunderland scored a last-minute winner for Arsenal to end the match 3–2.

In 1979, Neill came close, but was unsuccessful in his attempt to pull off a major transfer coup for Arsenal by signing Diego Maradona as a highly rated teenager from Argentinos Juniors. Neill also wanted to sign midfielder Glenn Hoddle from Spurs, but Hoddle had reservations about moving across North London to join his team's arch rival. Hoddle later said: "I don't think my brother would have ever spoken to me again if I had joined Arsenal."

Neill guided Arsenal to the 1980 final of the UEFA Cup Winners' Cup. In the semi-final against Juventus, Arsenal drew 1–1 in the first leg at Highbury, and were expected to have a formidable task in the second leg in Turin. But a late goal two minutes from time by Arsenal's teenage substitute Paul Vaessen gave Arsenal a 1–0 away victory and a 2–1 aggregate win. It was the first time Juventus had lost to a British team on home soil. In the final, Arsenal lost on penalties to Valencia in front of 40,000 people at Heysel Stadium.

Arsenal's success in cup competitions could not be matched in the league. The retirement of Malcolm Macdonald at the premature age of 29 due to a knee injury, and the departures of stars such as Brady and Stapleton, hampered Arsenal's league title ambitions.

In the 1980–81 season, Neill guided Arsenal to a third-place finish in the final table – the closest in 10 years that they had come to winning the league title. In the 1981–82 season, Arsenal finished fifth in the league.

Neill's 1982 summer signing of striker Lee Chapman from Stoke City for £500,000 was not a success, with Chapman scoring just four goals in 23 appearances for Arsenal before being sold to Sunderland for £200,000. In the 1982–83 season, Arsenal reached the semi-finals of the FA Cup and the League Cup, but lost both semi-finals to Manchester United.

In June 1983, Neill signed striker Charlie Nicholas, from Celtic for £800,000. Liverpool and Manchester United had also been keen to buy Nicholas, who had scored an impressive total of 50 goals in all competitions for Celtic in the 1982–83 season. Nicholas reportedly became the highest paid footballer in Britain after his move to Arsenal, and later became a cult figure at the club.

After being given an improved three-year contract at the start of the 1983–84 season, Neill was sacked by Arsenal on 16 December 1983. The dismissal was a decision which club chairman Peter Hill-Wood had reportedly agonised over. Neill subsequently retired from football when only 41 years old.

== Personal life ==
Neill opened sports bars in Hendon and Holborn. He also commentated on Arsenal matches for Arsenal TV. Neill headed up the business development department of The Hub (London), a total media management company in the City.

Politically, he was a Conservative.

Neill died in July 2022, aged 80.

== Career statistics ==
Scores and results list Northern Ireland's goal tally first, score column indicates score after each Neill goal.

List of international goals scored by Terry Neill
No.	Date	Venue	Opponent	Score	Result	Competition
1	17 March 1965	Belfast, Northern Ireland	Netherlands	2–1	2–1	1966 FIFA World Cup qualification
2	23 May 1972	London, England	England	1–0	1–0	1972 British Home Championship

== Honours ==
=== Player ===
Arsenal

- Football League Cup runner-up: 1967–68

=== Managerial ===
Arsenal

- FA Cup: 1978–79; runner-up: 1977–78, 1979–80
- UEFA Cup Winners' Cup runner-up: 1979–80
