= Arfon Griffiths =

Welsh footballer and manager

Arfon Griffiths MBE
Personal information
- Full name: Arfon Trevor Griffiths
- Date of birth: 23 August 1941 (age 85)
- Place of birth: Wrexham, Wales
- Position: Midfielder

Youth career
- 1957–1959: Wrexham

Senior career*
Years	Team	Apps	(Gls)
1959–1961	Wrexham	41	(8)
1961–1962	Arsenal	15	(2)
1962–1979	Wrexham	550	(112)
1975	→ Seattle Sounders (loan)	16	(1)
Total		622	(123)

International career
1971–1976	Wales	17	(6)

Managerial career
- 1977–1981: Wrexham
- 1981–1982: Crewe Alexandra
- * Club domestic league appearances and goals

Arfon Trevor Griffiths MBE (born 23 August 1941) is a Welsh former football player and manager. During his playing career which lasted from 1959 to 1979, Griffiths played at both professional and international levels, before becoming a football manager.

== Career ==
Born in Wrexham, Griffiths was originally spotted in local junior football by former Wrexham player Frank Blew, who then alerted the club's manager Cliff Lloyd. He initially signed Griffiths on amateur forms in May 1957, as the youngster turned down offers of trials from both Liverpool and Sheffield Wednesday. This started a 22-year-long association between with Wrexham as both player and manager.

He made his first team in a 2–1 home win over Reading in November 1959, having been a member of the previous season's successful Welsh Youth Cup winning side. He kept his place in the side for the rest of the season, collecting a Welsh Cup winners' medal from a 1–0 win over Cardiff City in which he scored the winning goal.

He became an established member of the side during the 1960–61 season, and it was not long before the bigger clubs began to take an interest. In February 1961 Arsenal paid £15,500 to sign him, and he made his debut in a 5–1 defeat at the hands of Wolverhampton Wanderers on 22 April 1961. He played intermittently in the 1961–62 season for Arsenal, making 14 league appearances as an attacking midfielder and scoring twice.

He gained international recognition as a member of the Wales under-23 side. Unable to maintain a first-team place at Arsenal, Griffiths returned to Wrexham who paid a record fee of about £12,000 to re-sign him.

Affectionately known to Wrexham fans as the 'Prince of Wales', he played a major part to some of the most successful years in Wrexham Football Club's history. These include guiding the club to promotion in 1969–70; winning the Welsh Cup four times; playing in three European campaigns, which included reaching the quarter-final stages of the European Cup Winners' Cup in 1976, before losing out to the eventual winners RSC Anderlecht, 2–1, on aggregate. He was awarded a testimonial match in 1972 against Bill Shankly's Liverpool, which netted him £3,000 for his testimonial fund. In total he made a club record 591 Football League appearances and scored the second-highest total number of goals in the club's history, 120.

In 1975, Griffiths spent time on loan with Seattle Sounders in the North American Soccer League. He made his debut in a 4-1 defeat against Los Angeles Aztecs with Seattle's goal scored by Griffiths's Wales international teammate Mike England. Griffiths scored his only Seattle goal in a 2-1 defeat to the Aztecs. Although he played only 16 times for the Sounders - 15 regular season games and one post-season play-off - Griffiths was selected in the 1975 NASL All Stars team (alongside Mike England).

== International Career ==
These successes also led him on to international recognition by gaining 17 full caps, the highlight of which was scoring at the Racecourse Ground against Austria in 1975, which enabled Wales to qualify for the 1976 European Football Championship finals. He was also selected for a Football Association of Wales tour to New Zealand, Australia, Tahiti and Malaysia in 1971.

== Managerial career ==
=== Wrexham ===
He played under eight managers at Wrexham, before taking charge himself in May 1977 following the resignation of John Neal. Griffiths had previously been his assistant manager for a year. Wrexham's directors had no hesitation in appointing him as Neal's replacement, and he kept faith with the same squad that had just missed out on promotion at the end of the previous season.

Griffiths led Wrexham to the Football League Third Division championship in 1977–78, becoming the first manager in the club's history to win promotion to the then Football League Second Division.

An abundance of unforeseen injuries affected the team's performances in the Second Division and they struggled to come to terms with a higher grade of football. On 13 May 1981, Griffiths resigned after an internal disagreement with the board. A season of heavy winter's snow had caused many postponements, and gate receipts had virtually dried up. Griffiths was asked to cut the playing staff, his backroom staff and the youth development team to reduce overheads. Griffiths refused to do so as a matter of principle and thus he left the club.

=== Crewe Alexandra ===
Although he began to assist Bangor City with their training in an advisory capacity, he was to make a quick return to football management, when he was appointed manager of Crewe Alexandra on 3 August 1981. He spent just over a season at Gresty Road until he resigned on 25 October 1982. He did play for his local side, Gresford Athletic, in the Welsh National League, for a short while, before finishing with football altogether to concentrate on his newsagents' shop in the village and playing golf.

Griffiths was awarded the MBE in June 1976 for his services to Welsh soccer, and in 2006 he was made club president of his home town club, Wrexham, as well as being added to the club's Hall of Fame.
