= Jack McClelland (footballer, born 1940) =

Northern Ireland footballer

Personal information
- Full name: John McClelland
- Date of birth: 19 May 1940
- Place of birth: Lurgan, Northern Ireland
- Date of death: 15 March 1976 (aged 35)
- Place of death: Lurgan, Northern Ireland
- Height: 5 ft 11 in (1.80 m)
- Position: Goalkeeper

Senior career*
Years	Team	Apps	(Gls)
1958–1960	Glenavon		
1960–1964	Arsenal	46	(0)
1964–1969	Fulham	51	(0)
1968	→ Lincoln City (loan)	12	(0)
1969–1976	Barnet	?	(?)
Total		109	(0)

International career
1960–1966	Northern Ireland	6	(0)
- * Club domestic league appearances and goals

John "Jack" McClelland (19 May 1940 – 15 March 1976) was a Northern Irish international footballer who played as a goalkeeper. McClelland played professionally in England for Arsenal, Fulham and Lincoln City, making 109 appearances in the Football League, as well as earning six caps for the Northern Ireland national side. He died of a brain tumour in March 1976 at the age of 35.
