= Dave Bacuzzi =

English footballer (1940–2020)

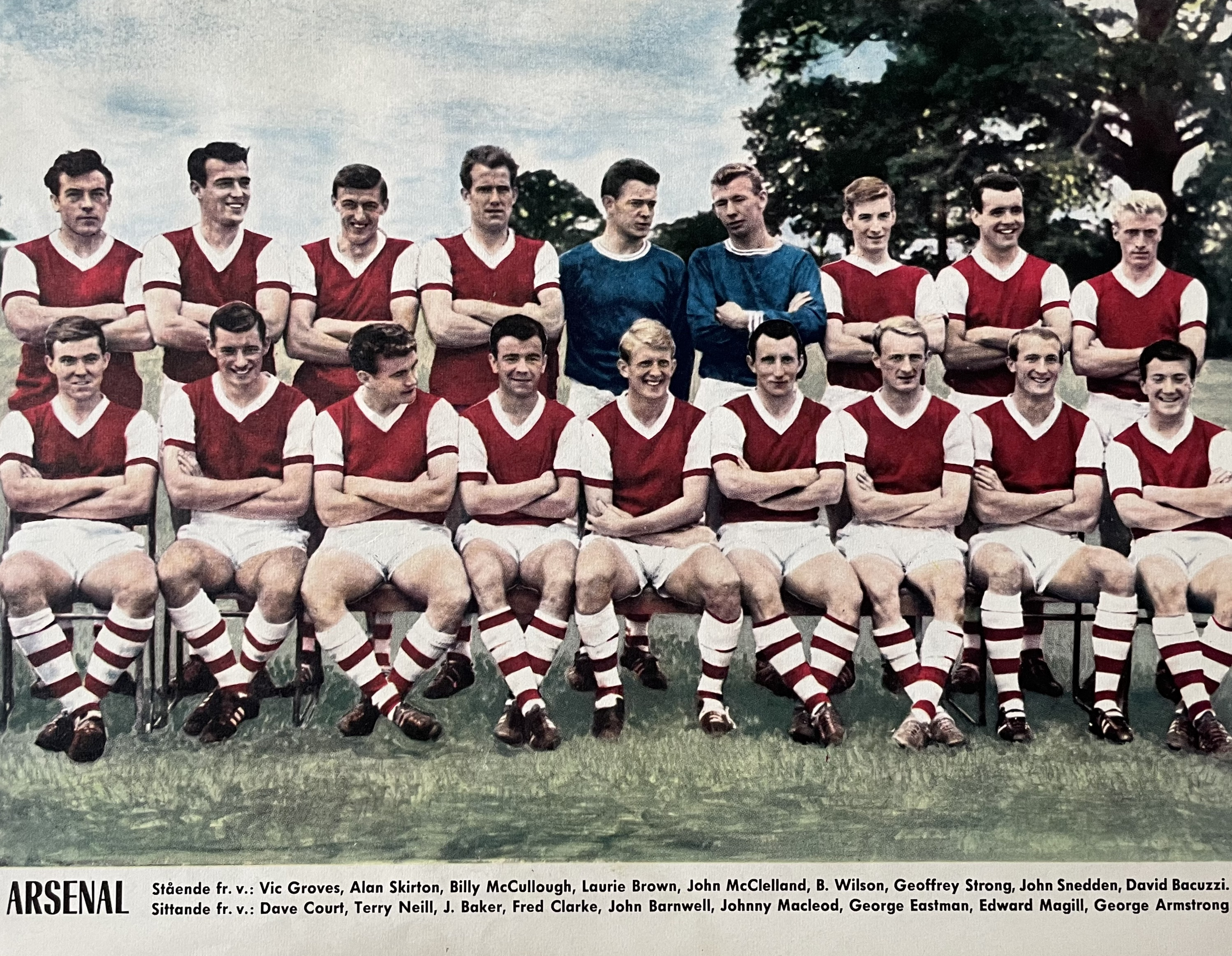

Personal information
- Full name: David Reno Bacuzzi
- Date of birth: 12 October 1940
- Place of birth: Islington, England
- Date of death: 21 April 2020 (aged 79)
- Place of death: Dublin, Ireland
- Position: Right back

Youth career
- Highgate School Old Boys
- Eastbourne United

Senior career*
Years	Team	Apps	(Gls)
1958–1964	Arsenal	46	(0)
1964–1966	Manchester City	57	(0)
1966–1970	Reading	107	(1)
1970–1974	Cork Hibernians	93	(0)

International career
1950s	England Youth	7	(0)
1971–1972	League of Ireland XI	2	(0)

Managerial career
- 1970–1974: Cork Hibernians
- 1974–1984: Home Farm
- 1973–1977: League of Ireland XI
- 1985: Shamrock Rovers (assistant manager)
- * Club domestic league appearances and goals

David Reno Bacuzzi (12 October 1940 – 21 April 2020) was an English footballer and manager who played for Arsenal, Manchester City and Reading. He also represented England as a youth international. After a moderately successful career in the English League, Bacuzzi settled in the Republic of Ireland where he enjoyed a successful spell as player-manager with Cork Hibernians before going on to manage Home Farm. He later opened a travel agency in Dublin.

Bacuzzi was born into an Anglo-Italian family that had settled in London. His paternal grandparents originally came from Milan. His father, Joe Bacuzzi, was also a notable footballer, playing as a defender for both Fulham and England during the Second World War.

== Playing career ==
=== Early years ===
Born in Islington, London, Bacuzzi began his career with Eastbourne United under the guidance of coach Ron Greenwood. When Greenwood was appointed assistant manager at Arsenal, Bacuzzi eventually followed him.

=== Arsenal ===
Bacuzzi signed as amateur for Arsenal in March 1958 and then as a professional in May 1959. He made his First Division debut for the club on 18 February 1961, taking the place of the injured Len Wills, in a 3–2 win against West Bromwich Albion. During the 1961–62 season he shared the right-back position with Eddie Magill, playing 22 games. The following season, he lost his place and, as Magill became the first-choice right-back, Bacuzzi only played another 11 first-team matches during 1962–63 and 1963–64 seasons. He did, however, help Arsenal Reserves win the Football Combination in 1962–63. In total he played 48 games for the Arsenal first team.

=== Manchester City ===
Bacuzzi signed for Manchester City on 24 April 1964 for a fee of £25,000 and made his league debut for the club in the second game of the 1964–65 season, a 6–0 win against Leyton Orient. During the season, which saw City finish as Second Division champions, he played a total of 44 games, a figure matched by only one other City player, Alan Oakes. Bacuzzi started the 1965–66 season as the first choice right-back under new manager Joe Mercer but as the season went on, he found his place taken by Bobby Kennedy. He played a further 16 times for City before being transferred to Reading.

=== Reading ===
Bacuzzi signed for Reading on 9 September 1966 for a fee of £5,000. On 31 January 1968 Reading played against Bacuzzi's former club Manchester City in the FA Cup. They held City to a credible 0–0 draw at Maine Road but then lost the replay 7–0.

== Coaching career ==
=== Cork Hibernians ===
In May 1970 Bacuzzi joined Cork Hibernians as player-manager. Initially, Bacuzzi thought he had been approached from a mysterious exotic location when he received a misspelled telegram asking him to contact Cork Island instead of Cork, Ireland. Bacuzzi subsequently guided Hibs to the League of Ireland title in 1971, beating Shamrock Rovers in a play-off. Then in 1972 and 1973 he also guided them to successive victories in FAI Cup finals.

=== Home Farm ===
In 1974 Bacuzzi was appointed manager of Home Farm and in 1975 he guided the club to victory in the FAI Cup for their first and only time. With a team that included Noel King, Dermot Keely and Martin Murray, they beat Dundalk, Cork Celtic and St Patrick's Athletic in earlier rounds before defeating Shelbourne 1–0 in the final at Dalymount Park. As a result, they became the first amateur team to win FAI Cup in forty years. The following season Bacuzzi took Home Farm into Europe as they competed in the European Cup Winners Cup, playing against French side, RC Lens. They drew 1–1 at home but lost the away leg 6–0.

As manager of Home Farm, Bacuzzi was responsible for the development of several Republic of Ireland internationals including Ronnie Whelan, Ken DeMange and Brian Mooney, all of whom subsequently signed for Liverpool. However, he also turned down the opportunity to sign a young Paul McGrath after a brief trial.

He also managed the League of Ireland XI during the qualifiers for the 1976 and 1980 Olympic Football Tournaments and the amateur team that qualified for the 1978 UEFA Amateur Cup.

He was briefly assistant manager at Shamrock Rovers under Jim McLaughlin in 1985.

== Honours ==
=== Player ===
Arsenal Reserves

- Football Combination: 1962–63

Manchester City

- Second Division: 1964–65

=== Manager ===
Cork Hibernians

- League of Ireland: 1970–71
- FAI Cup: 1972, 1973
- Blaxnit Cup: 1972
- Dublin City Cup: 1971, 1973
- League of Ireland Shield: 1970, 1973
- Munster Senior Cup: 1970, 1971, 1973

Home Farm

- FAI Cup: 1975

=== Individual ===
- SWAI Personality of the Year: 1971–72

== Death ==
Bacuzzi died on 21 April 2020, aged 79, in St. Vincent's University Hospital, Dublin, from COVID-19 during the COVID-19 pandemic in the Republic of Ireland.

== Sources ==
- Tony Matthews (2007). Who's Who of Arsenal. ISBN 1-84596-232-X.
- Maine Road Favourites – Where Are They Now ? (2006): Ian Penney with Fred Eyre ISBN 0-7509-4410-2
