= Alan Skirton =

English footballer (1939-2019)

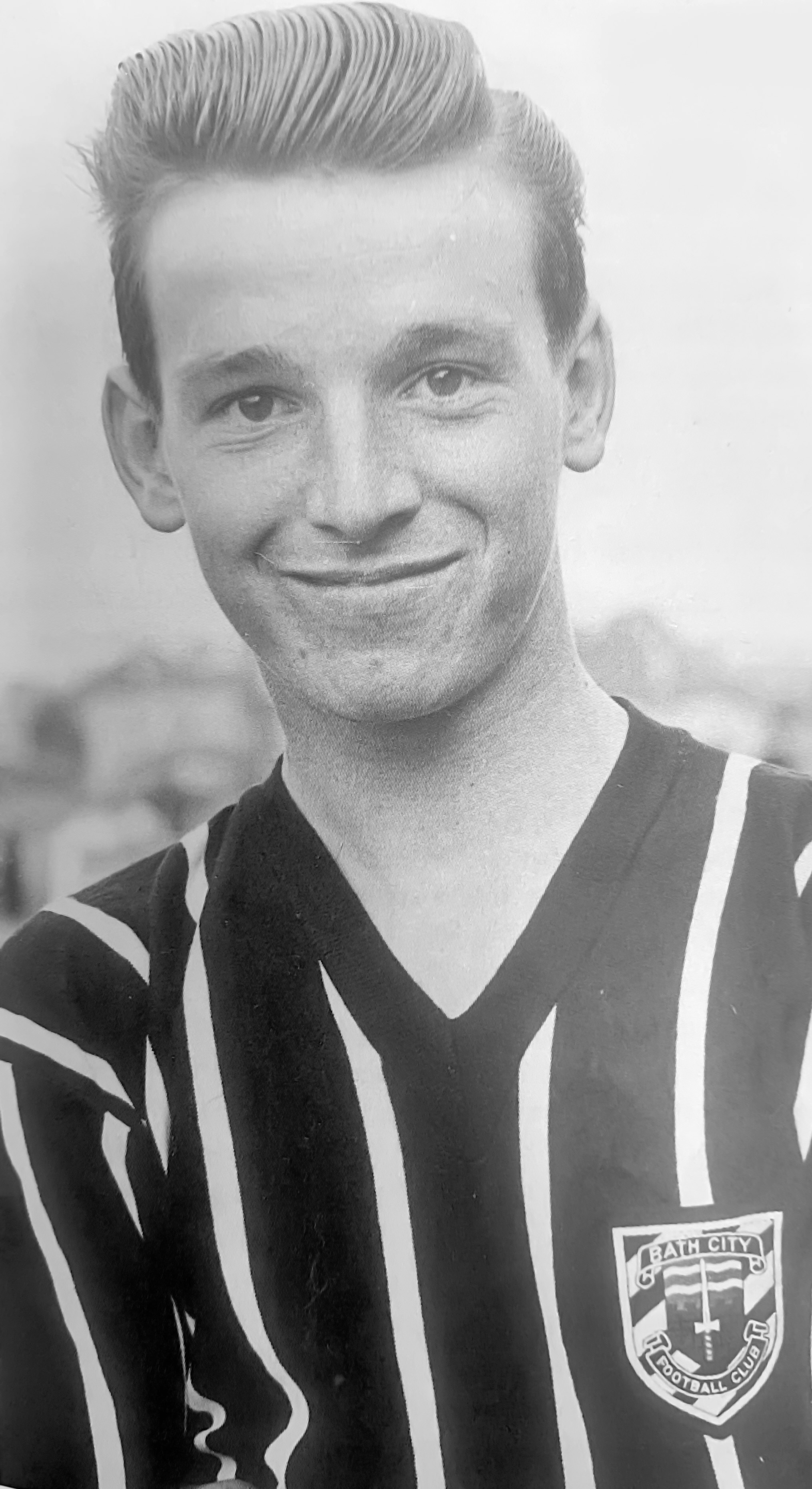
- Skirton for Bath City in 1957

Personal information
- Full name: Alan Frederick Graham Skirton
- Date of birth: 23 January 1939
- Place of birth: Bath, England
- Date of death: 12 May 2019 (aged 80)
- Position: Winger

Youth career
- West Twerton Youth Club

Senior career*
Years	Team	Apps	(Gls)
1956–1959	Bath City	144	(44)
1959–1966	Arsenal	145	(53)
1966–1968	Blackpool	77	(25)
1968–1971	Bristol City	78	(14)
1971–1972	Torquay United	38	(7)
1972	Durban City		
1972–1974	Weymouth		
Total		338	(99)
- * Club domestic league appearances and goals

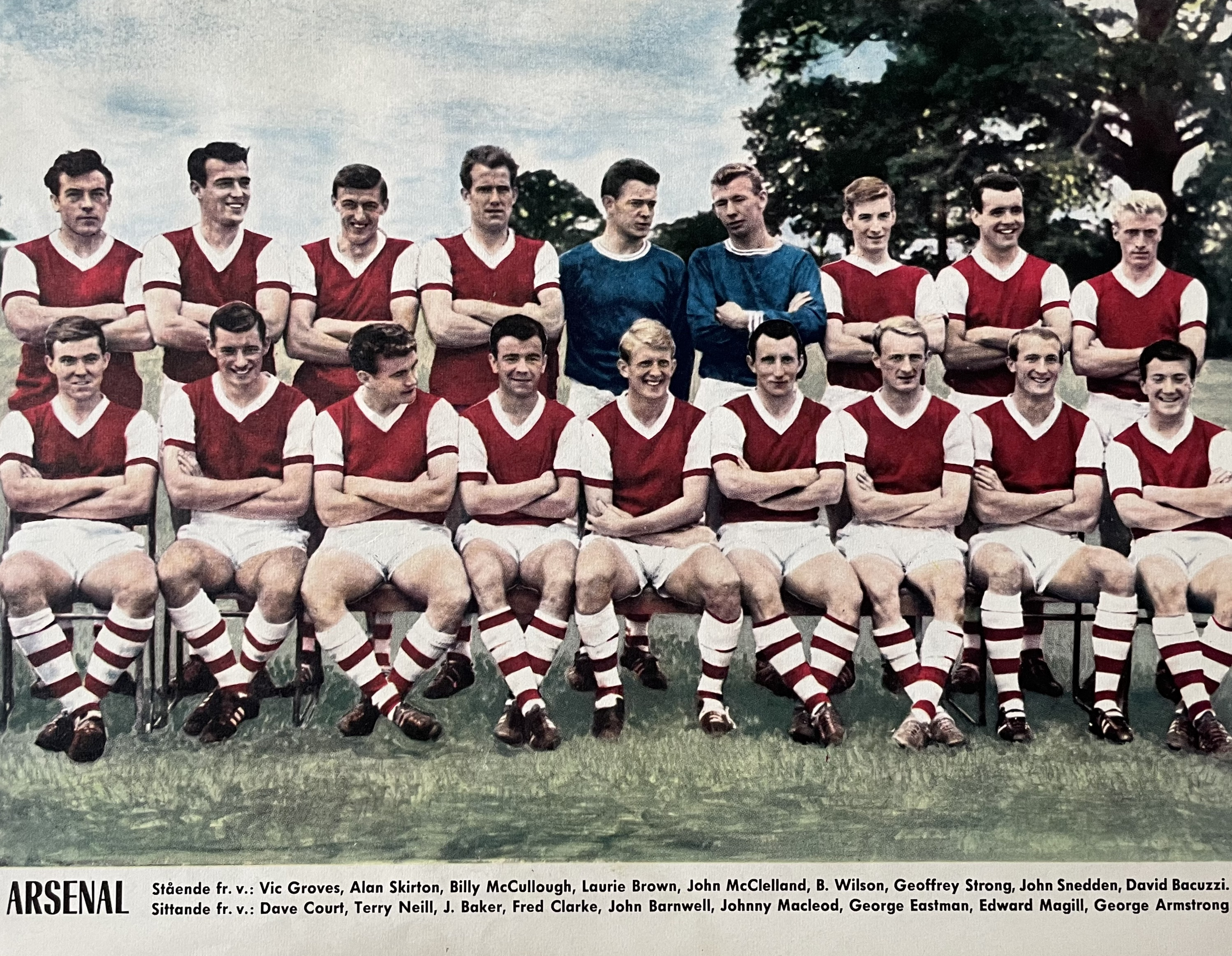
Arsenal F.C. in 1964, Alan Skirton standing as second from the left.

Alan Frederick Graham Skirton (23 January 1939 – 12 May 2019) was an English professional footballer, who played as a winger, spending the majority of his career at Arsenal. A "prolific winger", Skirton was known as the 'Highbury Express' during his seven-year tenure at the North London club.

== Playing career ==
Skirton started out as a player with West Twerton Youth Club in his home city of Bath before joining Bristol City as an amateur. However, they did not retain him and he then joined hometown club Bath City in the Southern League. He soon attracted the attention of several other clubs. Arsenal won the fight for his signature, signing him in January 1959 for £5,000. Soon after signing, however, Skirton contracted pleurisy and pneumonia and was out of action for eighteen months.

He finally made his debut for Arsenal against Burnley on 20 August 1960. He played sixteen games that season, sharing the right wing position with Danny Clapton. He supplanted Clapton altogether the following season, and scored nineteen goals in 40 matches, making him the club's top scorer for that season.

After the signing of Johnny MacLeod in the summer of 1962, Skirton was switched to the left wing, where he played for the next four seasons, albeit irregularly, as Arsenal manager Billy Wright preferred to field only one out-and-out winger. The emergence of the young George Armstrong also meant Skirton's place was under threat, and Skirton shared duties with Armstrong for his final two seasons at the club.

Nevertheless, Skirton still averaged twenty appearances a season, and made history by becoming the first Arsenal player to score a goal in a European match at Highbury, against Danish club, Stævnet on 22 October 1963. However, Wright's successor, Bertie Mee, was looking to youth as the means to success for the Gunners. After playing the first two matches of the 1966–67 season, Skirton signed for Blackpool on 12 September 1966 for £65,000. He had played 153 matches for Arsenal, scoring 53 goals.

Skirton scored on his debut for Blackpool five days later in the 1966–67 season, ironically at Highbury in a 1–1 draw, although he limped off injured later in the game. After missing three games, he scored once in a 3–1 victory over Tottenham Hotspur, and two more in a 3–1 win at Stamford Bridge over Chelsea. His home debut saw the Seasiders beat Newcastle United 6–0 at Bloomfield Road with Skirton scoring twice. However, his goalscoring was not so prolific in the rest of the season and he finished the season with ten league and cup goals in 28 games.

His eight league goals that season though couldn't save the Seasiders from relegation to Division Two. In the 1967–68 season, Blackpool narrowly missed out on promotion back to the top flight, finishing third on goal average behind Ipswich Town and Queens Park Rangers. Skirton scored 17 league goals that season.

After 17 games at the start of the 1968–69 season, Blackpool manager Stan Mortensen saw the emergence of Ronnie Brown on the right wing, and he allowed Skirton to return to the West Country where he joined Bristol City for £15,000 on 20 November 1968. He went on to play for Torquay United, and South African club Durban City F.C. He ended his career at Weymouth who he helped to win the Southern League Cup in the 1972–73 season.

== Post-retirement ==
Just before he retired from playing, Skirton became assistant commercial manager at Weymouth, before rejoining his old club Bath City as commercial manager in July 1974. On 14 September 1981 he joined Yeovil Town to take up the same position and remained there until his retirement in 2002.

He died on 12 May 2019 at the age of 80.

== Honours ==
Weymouth

- Southern League Cup: 1972–73
