= Gerry Ward (footballer) =

English footballer and manager

Personal information
- Full name: Gerald Ward
- Date of birth: 5 October 1936
- Place of birth: Stepney, London, England
- Date of death: January 1994
- Positions: Left wing; wing half

Youth career
- 1952–1953: Arsenal

Senior career*
Years	Team	Apps	(Gls)
1953–1963	Arsenal	81	(10)
1963–1964	Leyton Orient	44	(2)
- Cambridge City
- Barnet

Managerial career
- 1973–1974: Barnet
- * Club domestic league appearances and goals

Gerald Ward (5 October 1936 – January 1994) was an English footballer.

Born in Stepney, London, Ward joined Arsenal as a trainee in 1952 and was quickly propelled into the first team. He made his debut on the left wing in a home match against Huddersfield Town on 22 August 1953 at the age of 16 years and 321 days, this made him at the time Arsenal's youngest-ever player (since surpassed by Jermaine Pennant and then Cesc Fàbregas), and until 2008 he held the record for Arsenal's youngest-ever player in a league match, a record now held by Jack Wilshere. As Wilshere's appearance was as a substitute, Ward remains the youngest Arsenal player to ever start a league match.

Ward turned professional soon after his debut and made two more appearances in the 1953–54 season. However, he did not play for Arsenal for another four years after that; a large portion of that time was spent doing National Service, which prevented him from playing. He was demobbed in February 1957 and regained his place in the 1957–58 season, becoming a regular in 1958–59 at wing half. However, with competition from Tommy Docherty he was only a bit-part player between 1960 and 1963, making just 21 appearances over the three seasons. He left Arsenal in July 1963 for Leyton Orient; in all he played 84 times for Arsenal, scoring ten goals.

He spent one season at Orient, making 44 appearances and scoring two goals. He had a career in non-league football after that, playing for both Cambridge City and Barnet, whom he also managed for a brief period between 1973 and 1974. He died in 1994, aged 57.
