= John Barnwell =

English former football player and manager

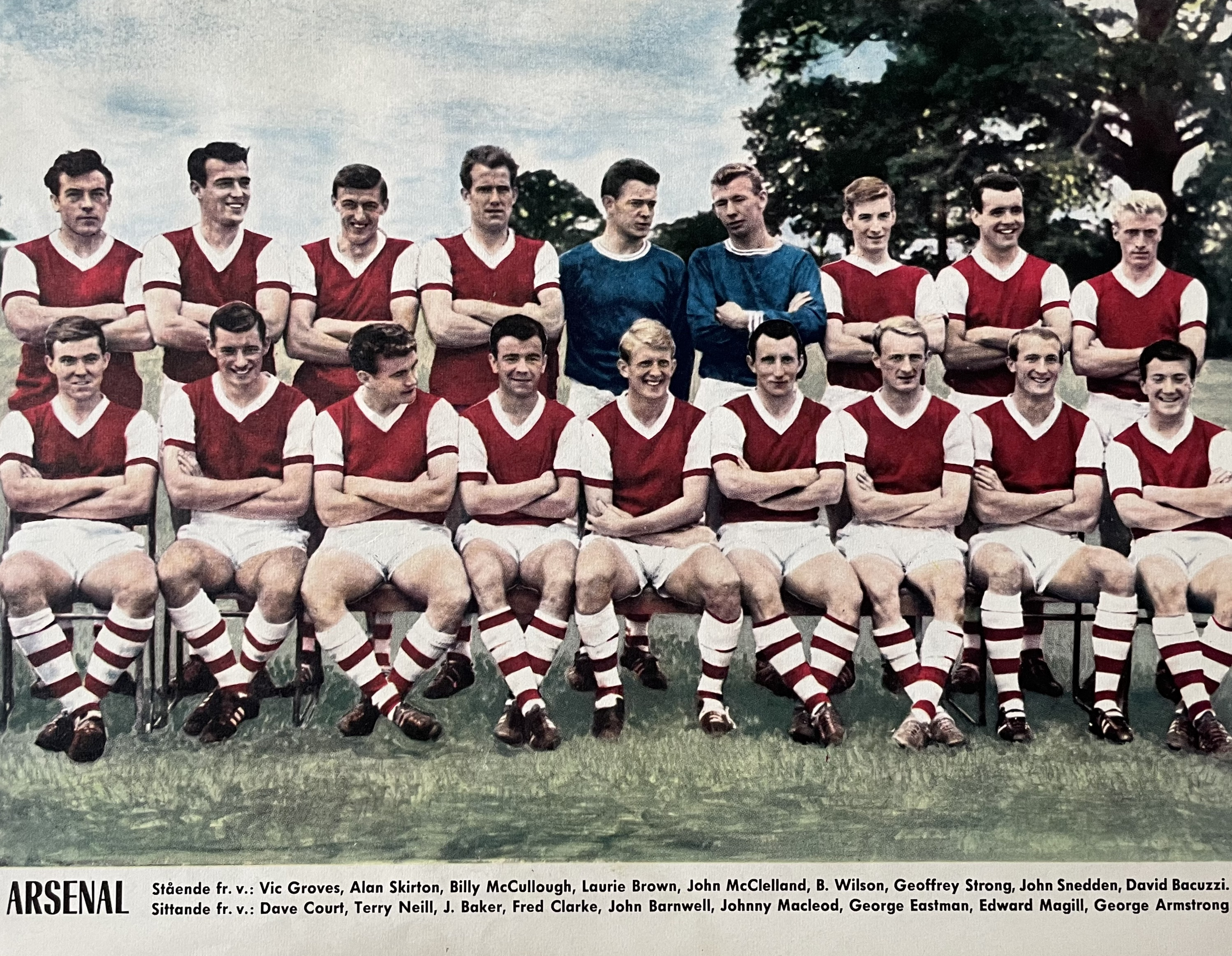

Personal information
- Date of birth: 24 December 1938 (age 87)
- Place of birth: High Heaton, Newcastle upon Tyne, England
- Height: 5 ft 7 in (1.70 m)
- Positions: Striker; midfielder

Youth career
- Bishop Auckland

Senior career*
Years	Team	Apps	(Gls)
1957–1964	Arsenal	151	(24)
1964–1970	Nottingham Forest	186	(22)
1970	Sheffield United	9	(2)
Total		346	(48)

Managerial career
- 1977–1978: Peterborough United
- 1978–1982: Wolverhampton Wanderers
- 1983–1984: AEK Athens
- 1987–1988: Notts County
- 1989–1990: Walsall
- 1993–1994: Northampton Town
- * Club domestic league appearances and goals

John Barnwell (born 24 December 1938) is an English former football player and manager. He was the chief executive of the League Managers Association.

== Career ==
=== Arsenal ===
Born in Newcastle, Barnwell first played as an amateur for Whitley Bay and Bishop Auckland before moving to Arsenal in 1955; turning professional in November 1956. A regular in the Arsenal youth side, gaining England youth and an England under 23 caps, he made his debut for the Arsenal first team against Sunderland on 13 April 1957.

Soon after Barnwell was called up for National Service, and did not play again for Arsenal till midway through the 1958–59 season. A semi-regular in the Arsenal side for the next six seasons, Barnwell initially played as an inside forward, behind the main strikers, but during 1961–62 he was switched to a more defensive wing half position. He couldn't maintain his place in the side and was dropped.

However, Barnwell returned in 1962-63, playing 37 games at wing half, only to lose form again the following season, however, and he was dropped from the side. Unable to find his way back into the Arsenal first team again, he transferred in March 1964 for £40,000. In total, he played 151 matches for Arsenal, scoring 24 goals.

=== Nottingham Forest ===
Barnwell joined Nottingham Forest playing there for six seasons, where he properly settled into a defensive midfield role; he did not win any major honours at Forest either, although they came close in 1966–67 – finishing as First Division runners-up and FA Cup semi-finalists. He played 186 matches, scoring 22 goals, for Forest.

=== Sheffield United ===
Barnwell left for Sheffield United in 1970. After a brief stint (playing nine games and scoring twice), he retired due to a persistent ankle injury.

=== Coaching and management ===
After retiring, Barnwell moved into coaching, becoming a coach under Noel Cantwell at Peterborough United, helping the club to promotion to the old Third Division. Barnwell succeeded Cantwell in 1977, and narrowly missed out on reaching the Second Division in his first and only season. He left United in 1978 after a dispute with the club's board, but soon joined Wolves, taking the club to an FA Cup semi-final against his old club Arsenal in 1979, and then victory in the 1980 League Cup final against Forest. Wolves finished 6th in the League in 1979–80. This was despite Barnwell being involved in a horrific car accident, in which he fractured his skull.

However, Wolves could not maintain their form at the turn of the decade, finishing 18th in 1980-81, although they did reach the FA Cup semi-finals for the second time in three seasons. With the club 18th in the First Division, Barnwell resigned on 8 January 1982 after a on-going dispute with the Chairman Harry Marshall.

Barnwell moved abroad, coaching in Saudi Arabia and later managing Greek side AEK Athens (1983–1984). He then returned to England in the lower divisions to manage Notts County (1987–1988), Walsall (1989–1990) and Northampton Town (1993–1994). After that, he semi-retired from management, before becoming manager of Grantham Town in February 1996.

Barnwell then took up his post as LMA chief executive in July 1996. Barnwell is now a life Vice President of the LMA, and is involved in various businesses related to football. He describes his passion as "the game, the people in it, and its future".

== Honours ==
Wolverhampton Wanderers

- Football League Cup: 1979–80
