= Eddie Magill =

Northern Irish footballer and manager

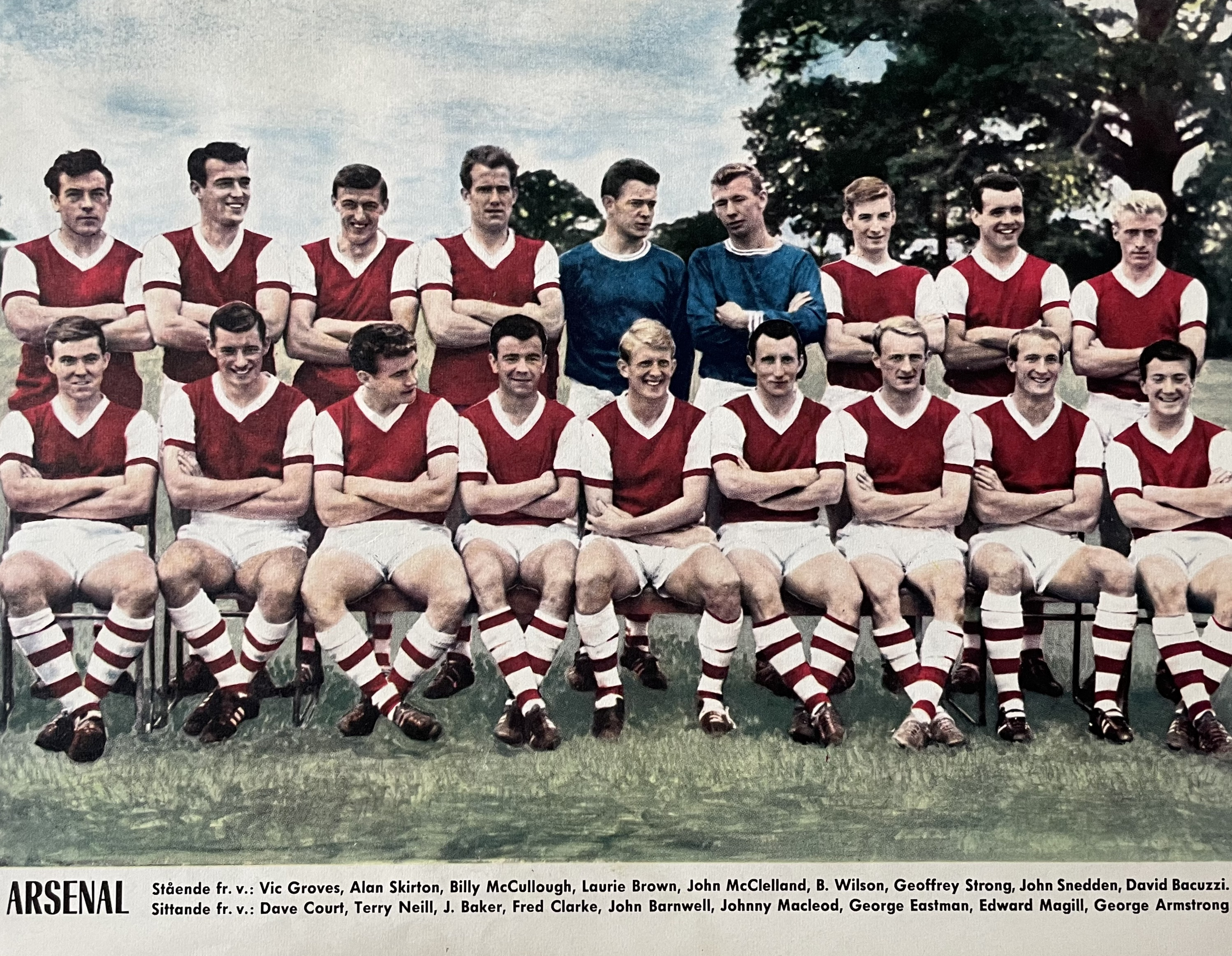

Personal information
- Full name: Edward James Magill
- Date of birth: 7 May 1939 (age 87)
- Place of birth: Lurgan, Northern Ireland
- Height: 5 ft 10 in (1.78 m)
- Position: Right back

Senior career*
Years	Team	Apps	(Gls)
–1959	Portadown		
1959–1965	Arsenal	116	(0)
1965–1968	Brighton & Hove Albion	50	(1)

International career
1961–1966	Northern Ireland	26	

Managerial career
- 1969: Viborg FF
- 1970–1973: B1909
- 1974–1978: Næstved BK
- 1979–1981: Frederikshavn
- 1995–1996: Frederikshavn
- * Club domestic league appearances and goals

Edward James Magill (known as Eddie or Ted as well as Jimmy) (born 7 May 1939 in Lurgan) is a Northern Irish former footballer.

Magill began his career with Portadown but moved to London club Arsenal in May 1959. He made his debut for the side against Sheffield Wednesday on 19 December 1959. A right back, he was seen as a potential replacement for the injured Dennis Evans and played for most of the rest of that season, but lost his place in 1960–61 to Len Wills and Dave Bacuzzi. He regained the right-back spot the following season, 1961–62, sharing it with Bacuzzi, before securing the place for good in 1962–63. In the meantime, he made his debut for Northern Ireland, and won 26 caps for his country in total.

Known for his passing and ball control, he kept his place in the Arsenal side until the signing of Don Howe at the end of 1963–64. Relegated to the reserves, Magill only made one more first-team appearance for Arsenal over the next fifteen months, mainly playing for the reserve team instead. He eventually joined Brighton & Hove Albion in October 1965. In total he played 131 matches for Arsenal, never scoring a goal. At Brighton, he spent three seasons before returning to Northern Ireland in 1968. After retiring from playing Magill coached in Denmark, first as coach at Viborg FF and B1909 and then as manager of Næstved BK and Frederikshavn.
