= Jackie Henderson =

Scottish footballer

Personal information
- Full name: John Gillespie Henderson
- Date of birth: 17 January 1932
- Place of birth: Glasgow, Scotland
- Date of death: 26 January 2005 (aged 73)
- Place of death: Poole, Dorset, England
- Height: 5 ft 9 in (1.75 m)
- Position: Forward

Senior career*
Years	Team	Apps	(Gls)
1947–1958	Portsmouth	217	(70)
1958	Wolverhampton Wanderers	9	(3)
1958–1962	Arsenal	103	(29)
1962–1964	Fulham	45	(7)
1964–1967	Poole Town		
1967–1971	Dorchester Town		

International career
1953–1954	Scotland B	2	(0)
1953–1958	Scotland	7	(1)
- * Club domestic league appearances and goals

John Gillespie Henderson (17 January 1932 – 26 January 2005) was a Scottish international footballer who played as a forward in the English Football League for Portsmouth, Wolverhampton Wanderers, Arsenal and Fulham.

== Club career ==
Henderson was born in Glasgow in 1932, and started playing football as a youth with his Bishopbriggs-based church team and for Kirkintilloch Boys Club. He signed for Portsmouth as a 17-year-old, and after completing his National Service in the Royal Army Ordnance Corps he made his debut for the first team against Sunderland in September 1951. At first playing as a centre forward, he also subsequently appeared at inside forward and on the left wing for the club. Henderson's performance with Portsmouth soon attracted the attention of the Scotland international management. A physical player known for his pace, fast crosses and good two feet, he was a regular goalscorer for his seven years with Portsmouth.

Henderson moved on in March 1958 to Wolverhampton Wanderers for £16,000. (Note: Reported transfer fees vary quite considerably. This article uses those from his obituary in The Independent: £16,000 (Portsmouth–Wolves), £20,000 (Wolves–Arsenal) and £14,000 (Arsenal–Fulham). The Herald's obituary gives £16,000 and £18,000. His profile on Arsenal's website gives £30,000, £20,000 and £14,000. Harris and Hogg's Arsenal Who's Who has £30,000, £30,000 and £15,000.) Wolves won the First Division title that season but Henderson did not qualify for a medal. He began the following season still at Molineux and appeared in a handful of early games in what would be another championship-winning campaign, but played only nine matches in all for Wolves.

Unable to secure a first-team place, Henderson moved on to Arsenal in October 1958 for £20,000, and made his debut against West Bromwich Albion at Highbury on 4 October; he scored twice in a thrilling 4–3 win. Injury interrupted his first season, but he still scored twelve times as Arsenal finished third in the league. He became a regular in the first team in the following two seasons.

Swindin's tinkering with the Arsenal attacking line-up meant the versatile Henderson was unable to hold down any particular position in the side, and midway through the 1961–62 season he was transferred to Fulham for £14,000. He had played 111 games for Arsenal in total, scoring 29 goals.

In his first season at Craven Cottage, Henderson helped Fulham reach the 1961–62 FA Cup semi-final, in which they lost narrowly to Burnley. Henderson also helped keep the Cottagers in the First Division for two seasons. He was a Fulham regular up until March 1963, when he broke his leg. An attempted comeback was unsuccessful, and he left the club in 1964. He continued to play non-league football with Poole Town, where he was top scorer as they were promoted to the Southern League Premier Division, and Dorchester Town until his retirement from football in 1971.

== International career ==
Henderson made his representative debut in a B international against England B in March 1953. His first appearance for the senior team came on 6 May, in a friendly at home to Sweden; Scotland lost 2–1. Henderson's only goal for Scotland came on 3 October, in a 3–1 win over Northern Ireland in a 1953–54 British Home Championship that doubled as a qualifying group for the 1954 World Cup. Scotland finished runners-up and qualified. Henderson was included in their 22-man squad, but only 13 of the 22 travelled to the finals. Henderson stayed at home on reserve with the likes of Bobby Combe and Jimmy Binning. Inside forward George Hamilton was also on reserve but travelled after Bobby Johnstone withdrew through injury. His seventh and final senior cap was also against Northern Ireland, in a 2–2 draw on 5 November 1958.

== Personal life ==
Henderson was married with two sons. After his playing days ended, he left the game and settled in Dorset where he worked as a storeman for a builders' merchant. He died in Poole in 2005 at the age of 73.

== Career statistics ==
=== International appearances ===
Scotland national team
Year	Apps	Goals
1953	2	1
1954	2	0
1955	1	0
1958	2	0
Total	7	1

=== International goals ===
#	Date	Venue	Opponent	Score	Result	Competition	Ref
1	3 October 1953	Windsor Park, Belfast	Northern Ireland	3–1	3–1	1953–54 British Home Championship	

== Honours ==
Scotland

- British Home Championship runners-up: 1953–54

Poole Town

- Southern League Division One promotion: 1964–65
