= Len Wills =

English footballer

Personal information
- Full name: Leonard Edward Wills
- Date of birth: 8 November 1927
- Place of birth: Hackney, London, England
- Date of death: September 2010 (aged 82)
- Place of death: Essex, England
- Position: Right back

Senior career*
| Years | Team | Apps | (Gls) |
| 19??–1949 | Eton Manor | | |
| 1949–1962 | Arsenal | 195 | (4) |
| 1962–19?? | Romford | | |
- * Club domestic league appearances and goals

Leonard Edward Wills (8 November 1927 – September 2010) was an English footballer who played in the Football League for Arsenal.

== Life and career ==
Born in Hackney, London, Wills first played for the youth teams of non-league Eton Manor, before being signed by Arsenal in October 1949. For the next four years he played in Arsenal's reserve team, playing either at right half or right back. In October 1953, Arsenal's regular right back, Joe Wade, damaged his knee, and Wills promptly stepped up to replace him, making his debut against Tottenham Hotspur on 10 October 1953 – Arsenal won 4–1.

Wills played so well that he replaced Wade for the rest of that season, playing 30 matches, and another 24 in 1954–55. However, Arsenal signed Stan Charlton in November 1955 and he displaced Wills out of the Arsenal first team. Wills became a bit-part player for the next couple of seasons, deputising for Charlton at right back or Dennis Evans at left back.

After Charlton left the club in 1958, Wills regained the right back position, and became a regular in the side for the next three seasons, but by 1961 his age was starting to count against him. Youngsters Dave Bacuzzi and Eddie Magill shared the right-back spot during 1961–62, with Wills not getting a single game. He left the club on a free transfer at the end of that season, signing for Romford. In all he played 208 games for Arsenal in League and FA Cup, scoring 4 goals. He never won a major trophy at Arsenal (arriving in the first team just after the 1952–53 title triumph), but did play in their 1953 FA Charity Shield win over Blackpool.

After retiring from playing, Wills left the game completely and had a second career in the DIY retail trade.

Wills died in Essex in September 2010 at the age of 82.
