= John Snedden =

Scottish footballer

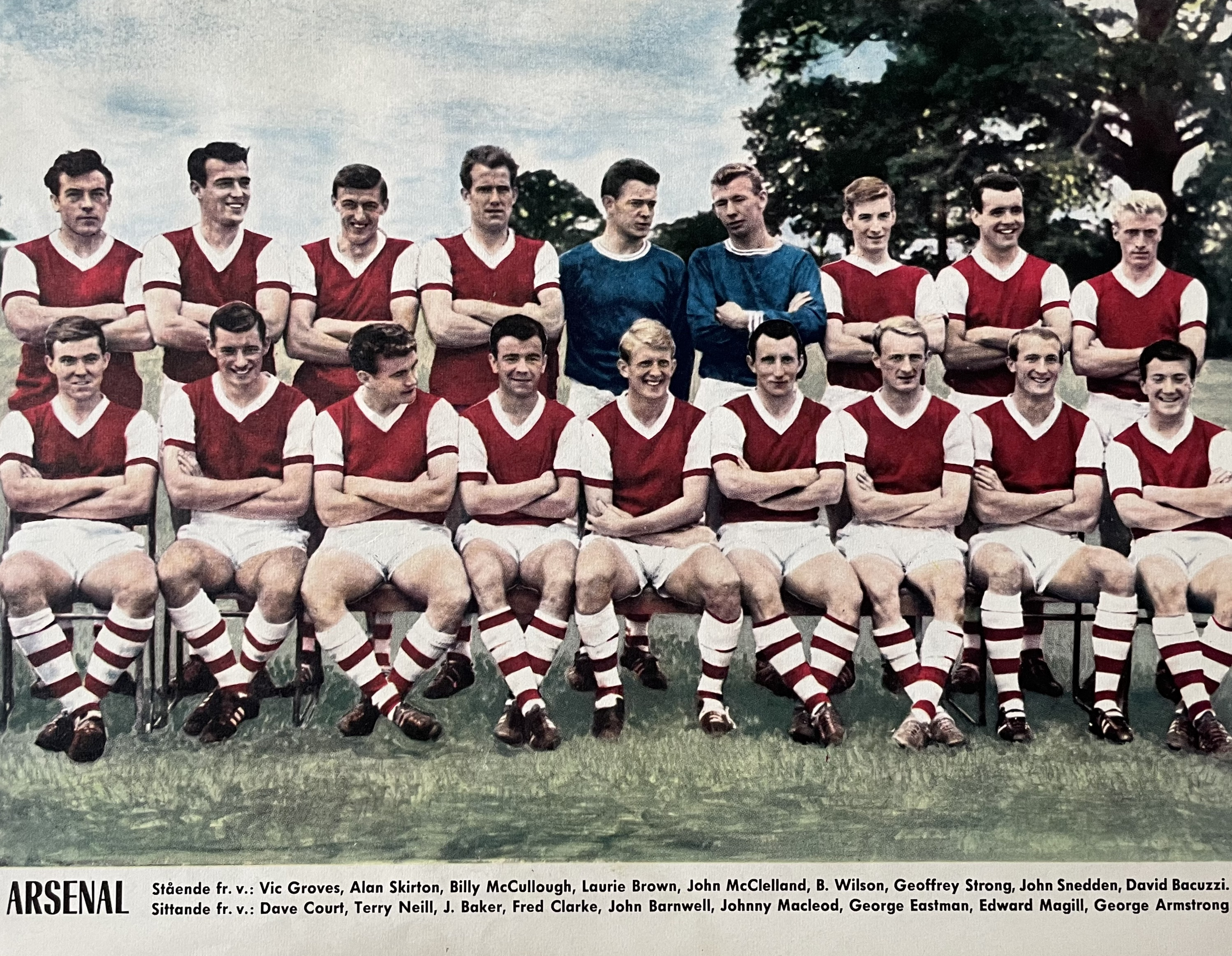

Personal information
- Full name: John Duncan Snedden
- Date of birth: 3 February 1942 (age 84)
- Place of birth: Bonnybridge, Scotland
- Position: Centre half

Senior career*
Years	Team	Apps	(Gls)
1959–1965	Arsenal	83	(0)
1965–1966	Charlton Athletic	20	(0)
1966–1968	Orient	27	(3)
1967–1968	→ Halifax Town (loan)	5	(0)
1968	Port Elizabeth City	?	(?)
1968	Addington	?	(?)
Total		135	(3)
- * Club domestic league appearances and goals

John Duncan Snedden (born 3 February 1942 in Bonnybridge, Scotland), is a Scottish footballer who played as a centre half in the Football League. On retiring from football John moved to Germany where he remained with his wife, Ingrid, until she died. He has only returned to Scotland twice in the years since his retirement.
