= Jack Kelsey =

Welsh footballer (1929-1992)

Personal information
- Full name: Alfred John Kelsey
- Date of birth: 19 November 1929
- Place of birth: Llansamlet, Swansea, Wales
- Date of death: 18 March 1992 (aged 62)
- Place of death: Friern Barnet, London, England
- Position: Goalkeeper

Youth career
- Winch Wen

Senior career*
Years	Team	Apps	(Gls)
1949–1963	Arsenal	327	(0)

International career
1954–1962	Wales	41	(0)
1955	Great Britain	1	(0)
1960	The Football League XI	1	(0)
- * Club domestic league appearances and goals

Alfred John Kelsey (19 November 1929 – 18 March 1992) was a Welsh international football goalkeeper, who also played for Arsenal. He is regarded as one of the greatest goalkeepers to play for Wales.

== Early life ==
Jack Kelsey was born at 382 Jersey Road in the Llansamlet area of Swansea, the second of three children born to Alfred Kelsey and his wife Sarah Ann (née Howe). His father hailed from London but had moved to South Wales in 1911 where he worked as a smelter furnaceman.

Kelsey attended Cwm School but left at a young age to work alongside his father and qualified as a crane driver.

== Club career ==
He was spotted by an ex-Arsenal player, Les Morris, whilst Kelsey was playing for his local side, Winch Wen, then in the Swansea & District League. Morris recommended Kelsey to Arsenal, who upon watching the goalkeeper for a few games, decided to sign him. Arsenal already had an established first-choice goalkeeper at this time, in George Swindin, so Kelsey could do nothing but wait for his chance to play for the first team.

After two years in the reserves, Kelsey made his first-team debut against Charlton Athletic on 24 February 1951 at Highbury, after Swindin had received an injury; However, Kelsey's first start was not an auspicious one, as Arsenal lost 5–2, their heaviest defeat at home since November 1928. Kelsey made a total of four appearances that season, but was dropped once Swindin returned and did not feature in Arsenal's 1951–52 run to the FA Cup final.

== Later career ==
After an entire season in the reserves, he returned to the side during the 1952–53 season, sharing goalkeeping duties with Swindin and Ted Platt; he made 29 appearances in a side that won the First Division title. He also played as Arsenal won the 1953 FA Charity Shield. With a rugged build and consistently solid catching, Kelsey managed to fully oust Swindin from the side (Swindin making only two appearances in 1953–54) and went on to be Arsenal's first-choice goalkeeper for the next eight seasons; only a broken arm sustained in an FA Cup tie against Sheffield United in 1959 put Kelsey out of the Arsenal side for any considerable amount of time, with Jim Standen taking over in the meantime.

Although his playing career coincided for the most part with a trophyless run for Arsenal – their best finish being third in 1958–59 – and thus he did not win further honours with them, he is still regarded by the club as one of their greatest-ever goalkeepers. He was also a runner-up in the first Inter-Cities Fairs Cup final in 1958, playing for a London XI representative side against FC Barcelona.

Kelsey also became a regular first choice keeper for Wales, making his debut in 1954, winning 41 caps in total. He was Wales's keeper in the 1958 World Cup, their only finals appearance until 2022. They were eventually knocked out 1–0 by winners Brazil in the quarter-finals. With the help of Kelsey, Wales did not concede a goal for 70 minutes against the Brazilians, until a shot by Pelé deflected off Welsh player Stuart Williams managed to beat Kelsey. Kelsey also played for the Great Britain team (which included three Northern Ireland players) against a Rest of Europe side in 1955 and for The Football League XI against the Scottish Football League XI in March 1960.

== Retirement and after ==
Kelsey's career was cut short after he sustained a back injury playing for Wales in a friendly against Brazil in May 1962, whilst trying to save at the feet of Vavá; despite many attempts to rectify his injury, he was forced to retire a year later. He received around £5,000 insurance money at the time. In all, he played 352 times for Arsenal, comprising 327 League matches, 24 in the FA Cup and 1 in the Charity Shield.

After retiring as a player, Kelsey later worked for Arsenal as the club's commercial manager, finally retiring in 1989. He died in Friern Barnet, London in 1992, at the age of 62.

Kelsey is survived by his two sons, Paul John Kelsey (Born 1958), Peter John Kelsey (Born 1961).

In September 2010 Kelsey was inducted to the Welsh Sports Hall of Fame.
