= John Petts (footballer) =

English footballer and manager

Personal information
- Full name: John William Frederick James Petts
- Date of birth: 2 October 1938 (age 88)
- Place of birth: Edmonton, London, England
- Position: Wing half

Youth career
- 1954–1957: Arsenal

Senior career*
Years	Team	Apps	(Gls)
1957–1962	Arsenal	32	(0)
1962–1965	Reading	34	(0)
1965–1970	Bristol Rovers	92	(3)
- Bath City
- Trowbridge Town
Total		158	(3)

International career
- England youth

Managerial career
- 1977–1978: Northampton Town
- * Club domestic league appearances and goals

John William Frederick James Petts (born 2 October 1938) is an English former professional football player and manager.

== Career ==
Petts was born in Edmonton, London. A wing half, he joined Arsenal in 1954, and made 32 appearances for them in the Football League. He later played for Reading and Bristol Rovers, before playing non-league football with Bath City and Trowbridge Town. He was also an England youth international.

Petts later had a spell as manager of Northampton Town between 1977 and 1978.

== Personal life ==
His son Paul was also a professional footballer.
