= List of Derby County F.C. players =

Derby County Football Club was founded in 1884, first entered the FA Cup in the same year, and became a founder member of the Football League in 1888. The club's first team have been English champions twice, and have the FA Cup once. All players who have made 100 or more appearances in nationally or internationally organised competitive matches for the club should be listed below.

Each player's details include the duration of his Derby career, his typical playing position while with the club, and the number of games played and goals scored in domestic league matches and in all senior competitive matches.

== List of players ==
=== Key ===
- Players are listed in chronological order according to the year in which they first played for the club, and then by alphabetical order of their surname.
- Appearances as a substitute are included.
- Statistics are correct up to and including the end of the match played 12 September 2026.

Positions key
GK	Goalkeeper	DF	Defender	MF	Midfielder	FW	Forward	U	Utility
CB	Centre back	FB	Fullback	LB	Left back	RB	Right back	SW	Sweeper
HB	Half back	LH	Left half	WH	Right half	WH	Wing half	IF	Inside forward
AM	Attacking midfielder	CM	Central midfielder	DM	Defensive midfielder	LM	Left midfielder	RM	Right midfielder
IR	Inside right	LW	Left winger	IL	Inside left	RW	Right winger	W	Winger

=== Table ===
Players are listed according to the date of their first team debut. Appearances and goals are for first-team competitive matches only; wartime matches are excluded. Substitute appearances included.

List of Derby County F.C. players with 100 or more appearances
Player	Nationality	Pos	Club career	Appearances	Goals	Notes						
Player	Nationality	Pos	Club career	Appearances	Goals	Notes	Walter Roulstone	England	MF	1887–1894	129	4
John Goodall	England	FW	1889–1899	238	85							
Archie Goodall	Ireland	HB	1889–1903	423	52							
Johnny McMillan	Scotland	IL	1890–1896	126	50							
John Cox	England	RH	1891–1899	238	7							
Jimmy Methven	Scotland	RB	1891–1906	511	0	Manager 1906–1922						
Jack Robinson	England	GK	1981–1987	180	0							
Jonathan Staley	England	DF	1891–1901	141	0							
Steve Bloomer	England	FW	1892–1906; 1910–1914	525	332	Record Derby goalscorer						
Joe Leiper	Scotland	FB	1892–1900	178	0							
Hugh McQueen	Scotland	OL	1895–1901	168	22							
John Boag	Scotland	FW	1896–1904	140	27							
Jack Fryer	England	GK	1897–1903	199	0							
John May	Scotland	WH	1898–1904	200	17							
Charles Leckie	Scotland	WH	1898–1905	139	1							
Ben Warren	England	HB	1899–1908	269	33							
Charlie Morris	Wales	DF	1900–1910	311	2							
George Davis	England	OL	1899–1909	155	29							
George Richards	England	WH	1901–1914	309	37							
Harry Maskrey	England	GK	1902–1909	222	0							
Ben Hall	England	CB	1903–1911	269	14							
John Davis	England	W	1904–1910	153	13							
Jack Nicholas	England	FB	1905–1912	143	0							
James Bagshaw	England	DF	1906–1920	240	6							
Alf Bentley	England	FW	1906–1911	168	112							
Jack Atkin	England	FB	1907–1922	325	3							
Ernald Scattergood	England	GK	1907–1915	192	3							
Tommy Barbour	Scotland	WH	1908–1921	294	3							
Horace Barnes	England	IL	1908–1914	167	78							
Jimmy Bauchop	England	FW	1909–1912	135	72							
George Lawrence	England	GK	1910–1924	145	0							
William Grimes	England	W	1910–1914	169	11							
Harry Leonard	England	FW	1911–1920	150	73							
Jimmy Moore	England	IF	1913–1926	218	82							
George Thornewell	England	OR	1919–1927	295	26							
Harold Wightman	England	CB	1919–1929	189	9							
Bert Chandler	England	RB	1919–1925	183	0							
Bernard McLaverty	England	HB	1920–1927	117	1							
Harry Storer	England	IL	1921–1928	274	63							
Ben Olney	England	GK	1921–1927	240	0							
Johnny McIntyre	Scotland	RH	1921–1931	369	9							
Lionel Murphy	England	W	1921–1928	235	49							
Syd Plackett	England	WH	1921–1927	156	3							
Tommy Crilly	England	FB	1922–1927	211	0							
Harry Thoms	England	HB	1922–1928	195	4							
Jackie Whitehouse	England	FW	1923–1929	200	86							
Harry Bedford	England	FW	1925–1930	218	153							
William Carr	England	FB	1925–1933	109	0							
Tommy Cooper	England	RB	1926–1934	266	1							
Georgie Mee	England	MF	1926–1932	155	31							
George Collin	England	LB	1927–1936	334	0							
Sammy Crooks	England	FW	1927–1946	445	111							
Harry Wilkes	England	GK	1927–1933	220	0							
George Stephenson	England	IF	1927–1931	120	56							
Jack Bowers	England	FW	1928–1936	220	183							
Peter Ramage	Scotland	IL	1928–1937	255	60							
Jack Barker	England	CB	1928–1939	353	2	Manager 1953–1955						
Jack Nicholas	England	MF	1928–1947	383	16	FA Cup Winner 1946; Player-Manager 1942–1944						
Jack Kirby	England	GK	1929–1938	191	0							
Errington Keen	England	LH	1930–1938	237	5							
Dally Duncan	Scotland	LW	1932–1946	289	69	FA Cup Winner 1946						
Ralph Hann	England	WH	1932–1939	120	0							
Jack Howe	England	DF	1936–1950	244	2							
Tim Ward	England	RW	1937–1951	260	5	Manager 1962–1967						
Jackie Stamps	England	FW	1939–1953	262	126	FA Cup Winner 1946						
Leon Leuty	England	CB	1945–1950	158	1	FA Cup Winner 1946						
Jackie Parr	England	FB	1945–1953	134	0	FA Cup Winner 1946						
Reg Harrison	England	RW	1945–1955	281	59	FA Cup Winner 1946						
Chick Musson	England	WH	1945–1954	280	0	FA Cup Winner 1946						
Frank Broome	England	FW	1946–1949	119	45							
Bert Mozley	England	RB	1946–1955	321	2							
Billy Steel	Scotland	IL	1947–1950	124	35							
Tommy Powell	England	IF	1948–1961	406	64							
Terry Webster	England	GK	1948–1958	178	0							
Johnny Morris	England	IF	1949–1952	140	47							
Jack Parry	England	IF	1948–1966	517	110							
Hugh McLaren	Scotland	LW	1949–1954	131	56							
Ken Oliver	England	DF	1949–1958	193	1							
Albert Mays	England	WH	1949–1960	281	21							
Ray Middleton	England	GK	1951–1954	120	0							
Geoff Barrowcliffe	England	FB	1951–1966	503	39							
Glyn Davies	Wales	CB	1953–1962	213	5							
Ray Young	England	CB	1954–1966	289	5							
Frank Upton	England	CB	1954–1961; 1965–1966	272	18							
Reg Ryan	Ireland	WH	1955–1958	139	31							
Les Moore	England	CB	1957–1964	156	3							
Ken Oxford	England	GK	1957–1963	162	0							
Ray Swallow	England	U	1958–1963	128	22							
Tony Conwell	England	RB	1959–1962	107	1							
Ian Buxton	England	IF	1959–1967	158	43							
Bill Curry	England	FW	1960–1965	164	76							
Barry Hutchinson	England	WH	1960–1964	116	57							
Mick Hopkinson	England	FB	1960–1968	131	6							
Reg Matthews	England	GK	1961–1968	246	0							
Phil Waller	England	CB	1961–1967	115	5							
Ron Webster	England	DF	1961–1978	535	7	League Champion 1971–72, 1974–75; Player of the Year 1973–74						
Bobby Ferguson	England	LB	1962–1965	129	0							
John Richardson	England	RB	1962–1971	133	5							
Gordon Hughes	England	RW	1963–1968	201	24							
Alan Durban	Wales	IF	1963–1973	403	112	League Champion 1971–72						
Eddie Thomas	England	FW	1964–1967	113	49							
Bobby Saxton	England	DF	1964–1968	108	1							
Colin Boulton	England	GK	1964–1978	344	0	League Champion 1971–72, 1974–75						
Peter Daniel	England	CB	1965–1979	246	8	League Champion 1971–72, 1974–75; Player of the Year 1974–75						
Roy McFarland	England	CB	1967–1981; 1983	530	48	League Champion 1971–72, 1974–75; Player of the Year 1968–69; Caretaker Manager 1984; Manager 1993–1995						
John Robson	England	DF	1967–1972	211	5	League Champion 1971–72						
Les Green	England	GK	1968–1971	129	0							
Dave Mackay	Scotland	CB	1968–1971	145	7	Player of the Year 1970–71; Manager 1973–1976						
John McGovern	Scotland	MF	1968–1974	237	20	League Champion 1971–72						
Kevin Hector	England	FW	1966–1978; 1980–1982	589	201	Record Derby appearances League Champion 1971–72, 1974–75; Player of the Year 1972–73						
John O'Hare	Scotland	FW	1967–1974	308	81	League Champion 1971–72; Player of the Year 1969–70						
Alan Hinton	England	LW	1967–1975	316	83	League Champion 1971–72, 1974–75						
Willie Carlin	England	MF	1968–1970	108	16							
Archie Gemmill	Scotland	MF	1970–1977; 1982-1984	324	25	League Champion 1971-72, 1974–75						
Colin Todd	England	CB	1971–1978	371	10	League Champion 1971–72, 1974–75; Player of the Year 1971–72; Manager 2001–2002						
Steve Powell	England	U	1971–1985	420	11	League Champion 1971–72, 1974–75; Player of the Year 1978–79						
Roger Davies	England	FW	1971–1976; 1979–1980	166	44	League Champion 1974–75						
David Nish	England	DF	1972–1979	237	14	League Champion 1974–75						
Henry Newton	England	MF	1973–1977	156	6	League Champion 1974–75						
Rod Thomas	England	DF	1973–1977	118	2	League Champion 1974–75						
Bruce Rioch	Scotland	MF	1974–1976; 1977–1979	184	54	League Champion 1974–75						
Charlie George	England	FW	1975–1978; 1982	147	56	Player of the Year 1975–76						
Dave Langan	Republic of Ireland	RB	1977–1980	155	1	Player of the Year 1977–78						
Gerry Daly	Republic of Ireland	MF	1977–1980	122	34							
Steve Buckley	England	DF	1978–1986	266	25	Player of the Year 1979–80, 1981–82						
Paul Emson	England	LW	1978–1983	138	13							
Dave Swindlehurst	England	FW	1980–1983	125	32							
Kevin Wilson	England	FW	1980–1985	141	19							
Paul Blades	England	DF	1982–1990	200	1							
Bobby Davison	England	FW	1982–1987; 1991	249	106	Player of the Year 1984–85						
Rob Hindmarch	England	CB	1984–1990	196	10							
Gary Micklewhite	England	MF	1985–1993	288	43							
Ross MacLaren	Scotland	CM	1985–1988	148	5	Player of the Year 1985–86						
Geraint Williams	Wales	MF	1985–1992	332	10	Player of the Year 1986–87						
John Gregory	England	MF	1985–1988	125	23	Manager 2002–2003						
Phil Gee	England	FW	1985–1992	152	31							
Michael Forsyth	England	DF	1986–1995	406	10	Player of the Year 1987–88						
Mel Sage	England	FB	1986–1992	175	4							
Nigel Callaghan	England	RW	1986–1989; 1990	100	13							
Ted McMinn	Scotland	LW	1988–1993	153	14	Player of the Year 1991–92						
Peter Shilton	England	GK	1987–1992	211	0							
Mark Wright	England	CB	1987–1991	171	10	Player of the Year 1988–89, 1989–90						
Trevor Hebberd	England	MF	1988–1991	106	14							
Dean Saunders	Wales	FW	1988–1991	131	57	Player of the Year 1990–1991						
Paul Williams	England	CB	1989–1995	195	10							
Martin Taylor	England	GK	1989–1997	120	0	Player of the Year 1993–94						
Jason Kavanagh	England	DF	1990–1996	127	1							
Dean Sturridge	England	FW	1991–2001	214	59							
Marco Gabbiadini	England	FW	1992–1997	227	68	Player of the Year 1992–93						
Paul Simpson	England	W	1992–1997	202	57							
Paul Kitson	England	FW	1992–1994	131	49							
Tommy Johnson	England	FW	1992–1995	129	41							
Mark Pembridge	Wales	MF	1992–1995	140	37							
Darren Wassall	England	CB	1992–1997	122	0	Interim Manager 2016						
Craig Short	England	CB	1992–1995	143	13	Player of the Year 1994–95						
Lee Carsley	Republic of Ireland	CM	1994–1999	166	5							
Russell Hoult	England	GK	1995–2000	138	0							
Darryl Powell	Jamaica	MF	1995–2002	227	11							
Gary Rowett	England	RB	1995–1998	120	4	Manager 2017–2018						
Chris Powell	England	LB	1996–1998	101	2	Player of the Year 1996–97; Caretaker Manager 2016						
Jacob Laursen	Denmark	RB	1996–2000	153	3	Player of the Year 1998–99						
Mart Poom	Estonia	GK	1997–2003	166	0	Player of the Year 1999–2000						
Stefano Eranio	Italy	MF	1997–2001	108	10							
Deon Burton	Jamaica	FW	1997–2002	143	31							
Rory Delap	Republic of Ireland	MF	1998–2001	113	13							
Horacio Carbonari	Argentina	CB	1998–2002	102	9							
Malcolm Christie	England	FW	1998–2002	129	35							
Paul Boertien	England	LB	1999–2007	126	2							
Seth Johnson	England	MF	1999–2001; 2005–2007	147	6							
Lee Morris	England	FW	1999–2004	100	18							
Georgi Kinkladze	Georgia	MF	1999–2003	100	8	Player of the Year 2002–03						
Chris Riggott	England	DF	1999–2003; 2011	100	7	Player of the Year 2000–01						
Richard Jackson	England	RB	1999–2007	127	0							
Adam Bolder	England	MF	2000–2007	181	11							
Lee Grant	England	GK	2000–2007; 2013–2017	186	0							
Tom Huddlestone	England	MF	2002–2005; 2017–2020	185	3							
Michael Johnson	Jamaica	CB	2003–2008	150	5							
Paul Peschisolido	Canada	FW	2004–2007	103	24							
Morten Bisgaard	Denmark	MF	2004–2007	112	10							
Stephen Bywater	England	GK	2006–2011	168	0							
Dean Leacock	England	DF	2006–2012	126	1							
Stephen Pearson	Scotland	MF	2007–2012	126	4							
Gary Teale	Scotland	RW	2007–2010	104	5							
Jay McEveley	Scotland	LB	2007–2010	101	6							
Robbie Savage	Wales	MF	2008–2011	137	7							
Paul Green	Republic of Ireland	MF	2008–2012	143	13							
Shaun Barker	England	CB	2009–2015	105	6	Player of the Year 2009–10						
Jake Buxton	England	CB	2009–2016	159	13							
John Brayford	England	RB	2010–2013	117	3	Player of the Year 2010–11						
Gareth Roberts	Wales	LB	2010–2013	104	1							
Jeff Hendrick	Republic of Ireland	MF	2010–2016; 2025	214	26							
Jamie Ward	Northern Ireland	LW	2011–2015	149	34							
Craig Bryson	Scotland	MF	2011–2019	276	42	Player of the Year 2011–12, 2013–14						
Jason Shackell	England	DF	2011–2012; 2015–2018	111	3							
Will Hughes	England	MF	2011–2017	187	12	Player of the Year 2014–15						
Richard Keogh	Republic of Ireland	CB	2012–2019	355	12	Player of the Year 2012–13						
Craig Forsyth	Scotland	LB	2013–	407	14							
Chris Martin	Scotland	FW	2013–2020	225	76							
Johnny Russell	Scotland	FW	2013–2018	162	28							
Andre Wisdom	England	RB	2013–2014; 2017–2021	145	2							
Cyrus Christie	Republic of Ireland	RB	2014–2017	117	2							
Tom Ince	England	LW	2015–2017	114	38							
Scott Carson	England	GK	2015–2021	171	0	Player of the Year 2015–16						
Andreas Weimann	Austria	RW	2015–2018; 2025–2026	115	10							
Curtis Davies	England	CB	2017–2023	175	9	Player of the Year 2021–22						
Tom Lawrence	Wales	FW	2017–2022	185	37							
Max Bird	England	DM	2017–2024	200	10							
Martyn Waghorn	England	FW	2018–2021; 2023–2024	150	37							
Matthew Clarke	England	CB	2019–2021; 2025–	144	5							
Jason Knight	Republic of Ireland	CM	2019–2023	166	14							
Louie Sibley	England	MF	2019–2024	173	20							
Liam Thompson	England	CM	2021–2026	124	4							
Eiran Cashin	Republic of Ireland	CB	2021–2025; 2026–	146	6							
Tom Barkhuizen	England	LW	2022–2025	113	14							
James Collins	Republic of Ireland	FW	2022–2025	118	31							
Nathaniel Mendez-Laing	Guatemala	W	2022–2025	145	21							
