= List of Derby County F.C. records and statistics =

This page details records and statistics related to Derby County F.C..

== Player records ==
=== Appearances ===
Players with 300 or more appearances for the club: starts(on as sub)

Pos	Player	Country	Years with club	Total Apps	Lge Apps
1.	Kevin Hector	(England)	1966–77, 80–81	581(8)	478(8)
2.	Ron Webster	(England)	1961–77	530(5)	451(4)
3.	Roy McFarland	(England)	1967–80, 83	525(5)	437(5)
4.	Steve Bloomer	(England)	1892–1905, 1910–13	525	474
5.	Jack Parry	(England)	1948–65	516(1)	482(1)
6.	Jimmy Methven	(Scotland)	1891–1906	511	458
7.	Geoff Barrowcliffe	(England)	1951–65	503	475
8.	Sammy Crooks	(England)	1927–46	445	408
9.	Archie Goodall	(Republic of Ireland)	1889–1902	423	380
10.	Steve Powell	(England)	1971–84	409(11)	342(10)
11.	Craig Forsyth	(Scotland)	2013-	360(47)	313(41)
12.	Tommy Powell	(England)	1948-61	406	380
13.	Michael Forsyth	(England)	1986-94	403(3)	323(2)
14.	Archie Gemmill	(Scotland)	1970-77, 82-83	404	324
15.	Alan Durban	(Wales)	1963-72	388(15)	336(10)
16.	Jack Nicholas	(England)	1928-46	383	347
17.	Colin Todd	(England)	1970-78	371	293
18.	Johnny McIntyre	(Scotland)	1921-31	369	349
19.	Steve Buckley	(England)	1977-86	366	323
20.	Richard Keogh	(Republic of Ireland)	2012-19	356	316
21.	Jack Barker	(England)	1928-38	353	326
22.	Colin Boulton	(England)	1964-77	344	272
23.	George Collin	(England)	1927-35	334	309
24.	Geraint Williams	(Wales)	1984-91	330(2)	276(1)
25.	Jack Atkin	(England)	1907-21	325	308
26.	Bert Mozley	(England)	1946-54	321	297
27.	Alan Hinton	(England)	1967-75	295(21)	240(13)
28.	Charlie Morris	(Wales)	1900-09	311	276
29.	George Richards	(England)	1901-13	309	284
30.	John O'Hare	(Scotland)	1967-73	305(3)	247(1)

Current players with 100 or more appearances:

Pos	Player	Country	Years with club	Total Apps	Lge Apps
1.	Craig Forsyth	(Scotland)	2013-	360(47)	313(41)
2.	Eiran Cashin	(Republic of Ireland)	2021-25, 26-	137(9)	123(5)
3.	Matt Clarke	(England)	2019-21, 25-	141(3)	136(2)

- As of game on 12 September 2026
- All Competitions stats include League, FA Cup, League Cup, League Test Match, Playoffs, Charity Shield, European Cup, UEFA Cup, Texaco Cup, EFL Trophy, Full Members Cup and Anglo-Italian Cup

==== Other records ====
- Youngest first-team player – Mason Bennett, 15 years 99 days, v. Middlesbrough, Championship, 22 October 2011.
- Oldest first-team player – Peter Shilton, 42 years 164 days, v. Watford, Division Two, 29 February 1992

=== Goalscorers ===
Players with 50 or more goals for the club:

Pos	Player	Country	Years with club	Total Goals	Lge Goals
1.	Steve Bloomer	(England)	1892–1905, 1910–13	332	293
2.	Kevin Hector	(England)	1966–77, 80–81	201	155
3.	Jack Bowers	(England)	1928–36	183	167
4.	Harry Bedford	(England)	1925–30	152	142
5.	Jackie Stamps	(England)	1938–53	126	100
6=	Alf Bentley	(England)	1906–10	112	99
6=	Alan Durban	(Wales)	1963–72	112	93
8.	Sammy Crooks	(England)	1927–46	111	101
9.	Jack Parry	(England)	1948–65	110	105
10.	Bobby Davison	(England)	1982–87, 91	106	91
11.	Jackie Whitehouse	(England)	1923-28	86	82
12.	John Goodall	(England)	1889-98	85	76
13.	Alan Hinton	(England)	1967-75	83	64
14.	Jim Moore	(England)	1913-25	82	75
15.	John O'Hare	(Scotland)	1967-73	81	65
16.	Horace Barnes	(England)	1908-13	78	74
17=	Bill Curry	(England)	1960-64	76	67
17=	Chris Martin	(Scotland)	2013-20	76	67
19.	Harry Leonard	(England)	1911-19	73	72
20.	Jimmy Bauchop	(Scotland)	1909-12	72	68
21.	Dally Duncan	(Scotland)	1931-46	69	63
22.	Marco Gabbiadini	(England)	1991-96	68	50
23.	Tommy Powell	(England)	1948-61	64	57
24.	Harry Storer	(England)	1920-28	63	60
25=	Peter Ramage	(Scotland)	1928-36	60	55
25=	Ray Straw	(England)	1951-57	60	57
27=	Reg Harrison	(England)	1945-54	59	52
27=	Dean Sturridge	(England)	1991-2000	59	53
29=	Barry Hutchinson	(England)	1960-63	57	51
29=	Dean Saunders	(Wales)	1988-90	57	42
29=	Paul Simpson	(England)	1991-97	57	48
32=	George Stephenson	(England)	1927-30	56	53
32=	Hugh McLaren	(Scotland)	1949-53	56	53
32=	Jack Lee	(England)	1950-53	56	54
32=	Charlie George	(England)	1975-78, 81	56	36
36.	Bruce Rioch	(Scotland)	1973-76, 77-79	54	38
37.	Archie Goodall	(Republic of Ireland)	1889-1902	52	48
38=	Johnny McMillan	(Scotland)	1890-95	50	45
38=	Raich Carter	(England)	1945-47	50	34

Current players with 10 or more goals for the club:

Pos	Player	Country	Years with club	Total Goals	Lge Goals
1.	Craig Forsyth	(Scotland)	2013-	14	14
2.	Carlton Morris	(England)	2025-	13	13
3.	Patrick Agyemang	(United States)	2025-	10	10

- As of game on 12 September 2026
- All Competitions stats include League, FA Cup, League Cup, League Test Match, Playoffs, Charity Shield, European Cup, UEFA Cup, Texaco Cup, EFL Trophy, Full Members Cup and Anglo-Italian Cup

==== Other records ====
- Most goals in a season – 43, Jack Bowers – 35 First Division, 8 FA Cup (1932–33)
- Most league goals in a season – 37, Jack Bowers, First Division, (1930–31) and 37, Ray Straw, Division 3 (N), (1956–57)
- Most goals in a single match – 6, Steve Bloomer (v. Sheffield Wednesday, First Division, 21 January 1899)
- Most goals in an FA Cup match – 4, joint record: Harry Bedford (v. Bradford City, 8 January 1927) and Jackie Stamps (v. Luton Town, 5 January 1946)
- Most goals in a League Cup match – 4, joint record Alan Hinton (v. Stockport County, 4 September 1968) and Kevin Wilson (v. Hartlepool United, 29 August 1984)
- Most goals in a European match – 5, Kevin Hector (v. Finn Harps, UEFA Cup, 15 September 1976)
- Youngest goalscorer – Mason Bennett, 16 years 176 days (v. Tranmere Rovers, FA Cup, 5 January 2013)
- Scoring in successive league matches – 6, joint record, John Goodall (1891–92), Alf Bentley (1909–10), Horace Barnes (1913–14), George Stephenson (1927–28), Jack Bowers (1930–31 and 1933–34) – the only Derby player to achieve this twice, Ray Straw (1956–57), Eddie Thomas (1964–65) – his first six games for Derby, Francesco Baiano (1997–98)

=== International caps ===
- First Derby international – Benjamin Spilsbury (for England v Ireland, 1885)
- Most capped Derby player while playing for the club – Deon Burton, 42 caps for Jamaica
- Most capped Derby player for England while playing for the club – Peter Shilton, 34 caps
- First Derby County players to play in a World Cup – Bruce Rioch and Don Masson (for Scotland v. Peru, 3 June 1978)
- First Derby players to play in a World Cup for England – Peter Shilton and Mark Wright (v. Republic of Ireland, 11 June 1990)

== Club records ==
=== Wins ===
- Most League wins in a season – 28 in 46 matches, Division 3 (N), (1955–56); League One, (2023–24)
- Fewest League wins in a season – 1 in 38 matches, Premier League, 2007–08

=== Defeats ===
- Most League defeats in a season – 29 in 38 matches, Premier League, 2007–08
- Fewest League defeats in a season – 5 in 42 matches, Second Division 1968–69

=== Goals ===
- Most League goals scored in a season – 111 in 46 matches, Division 3 (N), (1956–57)
- Fewest League goals scored in a season – 20 in 38 matches, Premier League, 2007–08
- Most League goals conceded in a season – 90 in 42 matches, First Division, (1936–37)
- Fewest League goals conceded in a season – 28 in 38 matches, Second Division, 1911–12

=== Points ===
- Most points in a League season (2 for a win) – 63 (from a possible 84) in 42 matches, Second Division, 1968–69 and Division 3 (N), (1955–56) and (1956–57)
- Most points in a League season (3 for a win) – 92 (from a possible 138) in 46 matches, League One, 2023–24
- Fewest points in a League season (2 for a win) – 23 (from a possible 84) in 42 matches, Second Division, (1954–55); 15 (from a possible 44) in 22 matches, Football League, (1890–91)
- Fewest points in a League season (3 for a win) – 11 (from a possible 114) in 38 matches, Premier League, 2007–08

=== Matches ===
==== Firsts ====
- First match – v. Great Lever, Friendly, 13 September 1884 (lost 6–0)
- First FA Cup match – v. Walsall Town, First Round, 8 November 1884 (lost 7–0)
- First League match – v. Bolton Wanderers, Football League, 8 September 1888 (won 6–3)
- First League Cup match – v. Watford, 11 October 1960 (won 5–2)
- First European match – v. FK Željezničar, European Cup, 13 September 1972 (won 2–0)

==== Record wins ====
- Record league victory: 9–0, (twice; home v. Wolves, Football League, 10 January 1891 & v. Sheffield Wednesday, First Division, 21 January 1899)
- Record away league victory: 8–0, (v. Bristol City Second Division, 29 September 1923)
- Record FA Cup win – 8–1 (home v. Barnsley St. Peter's, 30 January 1897)
- Record League Cup win – 7–0 (home v. Southend United, 7 October 1992)
- Record Premier League win – 4–0 (twice; home v. Southampton, 27 September 1997 and home v. Bolton Wanderers, 13 April 1998)
- Record European win – 12–0 (home v. Finn Harps, UEFA Cup, 15 September 1976)
- Record win on aggregate – 16–1 (v. Finn Harps, UEFA Cup 1976–77)

==== Record defeats ====
- Record League defeat – 0–8 (twice; away v. Blackburn, Football League, 3 January 1891 and v. Sunderland, First Division, 1 September 1894)
- Record home defeat – 0–7 (v. Walsall, FA Cup, 8 January 1884)
- Record FA Cup defeat – 2–11 (away v. Everton, 18 January 1890)
- Record Premier League defeat – 0–6 (twice; away v. Liverpool, 1 September 2007 and home v. Aston Villa 12 April 2008)
- Record League Cup defeat – 0–5 (twice; away v. Southampton, 8 October 1974 and away v. West Ham United, 1 November 1988)
- Record European defeat – 1–5 (away v. Real Madrid, European Cup, 5 November 1975)

==== Record draws ====
- Highest scoring draw – 5–5 (Home v. Everton, First Division, 15 October 1898, away v. Birmingham City, Second Division, 9 April 1966 and Home v. Scunthorpe, League Cup, 2012)

=== Attendances ===
==== The Racecourse Ground ====
- Highest attendance: 15,500 (est.) (v. Blackburn Rovers, FA Cup, 24 February 1894)
- Lowest attendance: 750 (est.) (v. Darwen, First Division, 18 November 1893)

==== The Baseball Ground ====
- Record attendance: 41,826 (v. Tottenham Hotspur, Football League First Division, 20 September 1969)
- Lowest attendance: 1,562 (v. Udinese, Anglo-Italian Cup, 15 November 1994)

==== Pride Park Stadium ====
- Highest attendance: 33,378 (v. Liverpool, Premier League, 18 March 2000)
- Lowest attendance: 1,952 (v. Wolverhampton Wanderers U21, EFL Trophy, 8 November 2023)

=== Transfers ===
- Record transfer fee paid: £10,000,000 to Arsenal F.C. for Krystian Bielik (2019)
- Record transfer fee received: £11,300,000 from Huddersfield Town for Tom Ince (2017);
