= List of Derby County F.C. seasons =

This article chronicles the seasons of Derby County Football Club from their formation in 1884 to the present day.

Chart of Derby County League Performances

Details of Derby County's final league position is given (from the 1888–99 season, when The Football League was founded), along with which round they made it to in both the FA Cup, the EFL Cup (which began in the 1960–61 season) and any European competitions that Derby had qualified for.

== Seasons ==
=== Overall ===
- Seasons spent at Level 1 of the football league system: 65
- Seasons spent at Level 2 of the football league system: 56
- Seasons spent at Level 3 of the football league system: 6
- Seasons spent at Level 4 of the football league system: 0

Season	League									FA Cup	EFL Cup (Note: The EFL Cup was founded in 1961.)	Europe / Other		Top goalscorer(s) (Note: Goals in all competitions (English Football League or Premier League, FA Cup, EFL Cup, EFL Trophy, Charity Shield and European) are counted.)	
Season	Division	Pld	W	D	L	GF	GA	Pts	Pos	FA Cup	EFL Cup	Europe / Other		Player(s)	Goals
1884–85	There was no League football until 1888.									R1				N/A	
1885–86	There was no League football until 1888.									R3				N/A	
1886–87	There was no League football until 1888.									R2				N/A	
1887–88	There was no League football until 1888.									R4				N/A	
1888–89	FL	22	7	2	13	41	61	16	10th	R2				(Scotland) Alex Higgins	12
1889–90	FL	22	9	3	10	43	55	21	7th	R1				(Scotland) Alex Higgins	14
1890–91	FL	22	7	1	14	47	81	15	11th	R2				(England) John Goodall	14
1891–92	FL	26	10	4	12	46	52	24	10th	R1				(England) John Goodall	15
1892–93	Div 1 (Note: At the beginning of the 1892–93 season, the Football League expanded to include a second division; the existing division (which Derby were playing in) was renamed the First Division.)	30	9	9	12	52	64	27	13th	R1				(England) John Goodall	14
1893–94	Div 1	30	16	4	10	73	62	36	3rd	QF				(Scotland) Johnny McMillan	21
1894–95	Div 1	30	7	9	14	45	68	23	15th	R1				(England) Steve Bloomer	11
1895–96	Div 1	30	17	7	6	68	35	41	2nd	SF				(England) Steve Bloomer	27
1896–97	Div 1	30	16	4	10	70	50	36	3rd	SF				(England) Steve Bloomer	31
1897–98	Div 1	30	11	6	13	57	61	28	10th	R/U				(England) Steve Bloomer	20
1898–99	Div 1	34	12	11	11	62	57	35	9th	R/U				(England) Steve Bloomer	30
1899–1900	Div 1	34	14	8	12	45	43	36	6th	R1				(England) Steve Bloomer	19
1900–01	Div 1	34	12	7	15	55	42	31	12th	QF				(England) Steve Bloomer	24
1901–02	Div 1	34	13	9	12	39	41	35	6th	SF				(England) Steve Bloomer	18
1902–03	Div 1	34	16	3	15	50	47	35	9th	R/U				(England) Steve Bloomer	13
1903–04	Div 1	34	9	10	15	58	60	35	14th	SF				(England) Steve Bloomer	25
1904–05	Div 1	34	12	8	14	37	48	32	11th	R1				(England) Steve Bloomer	13
1905–06	Div 1	38	14	7	17	39	58	35	15th	R2				(England) Steve Bloomer	12
1906–07	Div 1	38	9	9	20	41	59	27	19th	R3				(Scotland) Jimmy Long	9
1907–08	Div 2	38	21	4	13	77	45	46	6th	R1				(England) Alf Bentley	28
1908–09	Div 2	38	16	11	11	55	41	43	5th	SF				(England) Alf Bentley	32
1909–10	Div 2	38	22	9	7	72	47	53	4th	R2				(England) Alf Bentley	31
1910–11	Div 2	38	17	8	13	73	52	42	6th	QF				(England) Steve Bloomer	24
1911–12	Div 2	38	23	8	7	74	28	54	1st	R2				(England) Steve Bloomer	19
1912–13	Div 1	38	17	8	13	69	66	42	7th	R1				(England) Harry Leonard	15
1913–14	Div 1	38	8	11	19	55	71	27	20th	R2				(England) Horace Barnes	25
1914–15	Div 2	38	23	7	8	71	33	53	1st	R1				(England) Jimmy Moore	22
No competitive football was played between 1915 and 1919 due to the World War I
1919–20	Div 1	42	13	12	17	47	57	38	18th	R1				(England) Noah Burton	13
1920–21	Div 1	42	5	16	21	32	58	26	21st	R2				(Scotland) Bill Paterson	8
1921–22	Div 2	42	15	9	18	60	64	39	12th	R1				(England) Jimmy Moore	17
1922–23	Div 2	42	14	11	17	46	50	29	14th	SF				(England) Jimmy Moore	17
1923–24	Div 2	42	21	9	12	75	54	51	3rd	R3				(England) Harry Storer	27
1924–25	Div 2	42	22	11	9	71	36	55	3rd	R1				(England) Albert Fairclough	22
1925–26	Div 2	42	25	7	10	77	42	57	2nd	R4				(England) Harry Bedford	28
1926–27	Div 1	42	17	7	18	86	73	41	12th	R4				(England) Harry Bedford	26
1927–28	Div 1	42	17	10	15	96	83	44	4th	R4				(England) Harry Bedford	28
1928–29	Div 1	42	18	10	14	86	71	46	6th	R4				(England) Harry Bedford	30
1929–30	Div 1	42	21	8	13	90	82	50	2nd	R4				(England) Harry Bedford	31
1930–31	Div 1	42	18	10	14	94	79	46	6th	R3				(England) Jack Bowers	39
1931–32	Div 1	42	14	10	18	71	75	38	15th	R5				(England) Jack Bowers	26
1932–33	Div 1	42	15	14	13	76	69	44	7th	SF				(England) Jack Bowers	43
1933–34	Div 1	42	17	11	14	68	54	45	4th	R5				(England) Jack Bowers	37
1934–35	Div 1	42	18	9	15	81	66	45	6th	R5				(Scotland) Hughie Gallacher	24
1935–36	Div 1	42	18	12	12	61	52	48	2nd	QF				(Scotland) Hughie Gallacher	16
1936–37	Div 1	42	21	7	14	96	90	49	4th	R5				(Wales) Dai Astley	29
1937–38	Div 1	42	15	10	17	66	87	40	13th	R3				(Wales) Dai Astley	17
1938–39	Div 1	42	19	8	15	66	55	46	6th	R3				(England) Ronnie Dix (Scotland) Dave McCulloch	16
1939–40	Div 1	Abandoned due to World War II													
No competitive football was played between 1940 and 1946 due to the World War II
1945–46	Suspended due to World War II									W				(England) Raich Carter	12
1946–47	Div 1	42	18	5	19	73	79	41	14th	R5				(England) Raich Carter	21
1947–48	Div 1	42	19	12	11	77	57	50	4th	SF				(England) Reg Harrison	18
1948–49	Div 1	42	22	9	11	74	55	53	3rd	QF				(Scotland) Billy Steel	15
1949–50	Div 1	42	17	10	15	69	61	44	11th	QF				(England) Jackie Stamps	29
1950–51	Div 1	42	16	8	18	81	75	42	11th	R4				(England) Jack Lee	29
1951–52	Div 1	42	15	7	20	63	80	37	17th	R3				(England) Johnny Morris (England) Jack Parry	11
1952–53	Div 1	42	11	10	21	59	74	32	22nd	R3				(England) Jack Lee	17
1953–54	Div 2	42	12	11	19	64	82	35	18th	R3				(Scotland) Hugh McLaren	11
1954–55	Div 2	42	7	9	26	53	82	23	22nd	R2				(Scotland) Jimmy Dunn (England) Tommy Powell (England) Jesse Pye	8
1955–56	Div 3 (N)	46	28	7	11	110	55	63	2nd	R2				(England) Jack Parry	27
1956–57	Div 3 (N)	46	26	11	9	111	53	63	1st	R2				(England) Ray Straw	37
1957–58	Div 2	42	14	8	20	60	81	36	16th	R3				(Republic of Ireland) Reg Ryan	14
1958–59	Div 2	42	20	8	14	74	71	48	7th	R3				(England) Jack Parry	16
1959–60	Div 2	42	14	7	21	61	77	35	18th	R3				(England) Peter Thompson	12
1960–61	Div 2	42	15	10	17	80	80	40	12th	R3	R3			(England) Bill Curry	20
1961–62	Div 2	42	14	11	17	68	75	39	16th	R4	R3			(England) Bill Curry	25
1962–63	Div 2	42	12	12	18	61	72	36	18th	R4	R3			(England) Bill Curry (England) Barry Hutchinson	22
1963–64	Div 2	42	14	11	17	56	67	39	13th	R3	R2			(Wales) Alan Durban	11
1964–65	Div 2	42	16	11	15	84	79	43	9th	R3	R2			(Wales) Alan Durban (England) Eddie Thomas	22
1965–66	Div 2	42	16	11	15	71	68	43	8th	R3	R3			(Wales) Alan Durban (England) Eddie Thomas	17
1966–67	Div 2	42	12	12	18	68	72	36	17th	R3	R2			(England) Kevin Hector	16
1967–68	Div 2	42	13	10	19	71	78	36	18th	R3	SF			(England) Kevin Hector	24
1968–69	Div 2	42	26	11	5	65	32	63	1st	R3	QF			(England) Kevin Hector	20
1969–70	Div 1	42	22	9	11	64	37	53	4th	R5	QF			(England) Kevin Hector (Scotland) John O'Hare	16
1970–71	Div 1	42	16	10	16	56	54	42	9th	R5	R4	Fairs Cup	Ban (Note: Derby qualified for the Fairs Cup, but were banned from competing due to financial irregularities.)	(Scotland) John O'Hare	15
1971–72	Div 1	42	24	10	8	69	33	58	1st	R5	R2			(England) Alan Hinton	20
1972–73	Div 1	42	19	8	15	56	54	46	7th	QF	R3	European Cup	SF	(England) Kevin Hector	23
1973–74	Div 1	42	17	14	11	52	42	48	3rd	R4	R2			(England) Kevin Hector	19
1974–75	Div 1	42	21	11	10	67	49	53	1st	R5	R3	UEFA Cup	R3	(England) Kevin Hector	21
1975–76	Div 1	42	21	11	10	75	58	53	4th	SF	R3	Charity Shield	W	(England) Charlie George	24
1975–76	Div 1	42	21	11	10	75	58	53	4th	SF	R3	European Cup	R2	(England) Charlie George	24
1976–77	Div 1	42	9	19	14	50	55	37	15th	QF	QF	UEFA Cup	R2	(England) Charlie George	16
1977–78	Div 1	42	14	13	15	54	59	41	12th	R5	R3			(Republic of Ireland) Gerry Daly	12
1978–79	Div 1	42	10	11	21	44	71	31	19th	R3	R3			(Republic of Ireland) Gerry Daly	13
1979–80	Div 1	42	11	8	23	47	67	30	21st	R3	R2			(England) Alan Biley	9
1980–81	Div 2	42	15	15	12	57	52	45	6th	R3	R2			(England) David Swindlehurst	11
1981–82	Div 2	42	12	12	18	53	68	48 (Note: At the beginning of the 1981–82 season, the Football League changed the points system from two to three points for a win.)	16th	R3	R2			(Northern Ireland) Kevin Wilson	9
1982–83	Div 2	42	10	19	13	49	58	49	13th	R5	R3			(England) David Swindlehurst	11
1983–84	Div 2	42	11	9	22	36	72	42	20th	QF	R2			(England) Bobby Davison	18
1984–85	Div 3 (Note: At the beginning of the 1958–59 season, the Football League's Third Division (North) and Third Division (South) were replaced by a national Third Division and a national Fourth Division; therefore, Derby competed in the national Third Division upon relegation in 1984.)	46	19	13	14	65	54	70	7th (Note: Lowest League finish.)	R1	R2	Associate Members' Cup	R1	(England) Bobby Davison	26
1985–86	Div 3	46	23	15	8	80	41	84	3rd	R5	R3	Associate Members' Cup	PR	(England) Bobby Davison	23
1986–87	Div 2	42	25	9	8	64	38	84	1st	R3	R3			(England) Bobby Davison	22
1987–88	Div 1	40	10	13	17	35	45	43	15th	R3	R2	All English Clubs banned from European competition due to the Heysel Stadium disaster. (Note: Had English clubs not been banned from competing in European competition, Derby would have taken part in the UEFA Cup in the 1989–90 season.)		(England) Phil Gee (England) John Gregory	6
1988–89	Div 1	38	17	7	14	40	38	58	5th	R4	R3	All English Clubs banned from European competition due to the Heysel Stadium disaster.		(Wales) Dean Saunders	15
1989–90	Div 1	38	13	7	18	43	40	46	16th	R3	QF	All English Clubs banned from European competition due to the Heysel Stadium disaster.		(Wales) Dean Saunders	21
1990–91	Div 1	38	5	9	24	37	75	24	20th	R3	R4			(Wales) Dean Saunders	21
1991–92	Div 2	46	23	9	14	65	51	78	3rd	R4	R3	League play-offs	SF	(England) Paul Williams	16
1992–93	Div 1 (Note: At the beginning of the 1992–93 season, the clubs in the Football League First Division broke away to form the FA Premier League; as a result, the Football League's three remaining divisions were renamed: the Second Division (which Derby were playing in) became the First Division, the Third Division became the Second Division and the Fourth Division became the Third Division.)	46	19	9	18	65	57	66	8th	QF	R3	Anglo-Italian Cup	R/U	(England) Paul Kitson	24
1993–94	Div 1	46	20	11	15	73	68	71	6th	R3	R3	Anglo-Italian Cup	DNQ	(England) Tommy Johnson	19
1993–94	Div 1	46	20	11	15	73	68	71	6th	R3	R3	League play-offs	R/U	(England) Tommy Johnson	19
1994–95	Div 1	46	18	12	16	66	51	66	9th	R3	R4	Anglo-Italian Cup	GS	(England) Marco Gabbiadini	13
1995–96	Div 1	46	21	16	9	71	51	79	2nd	R3	R3			(England) Dean Sturridge	20
1996–97	Prem	38	11	13	14	45	58	46	12th	QF	R2			(England) Dean Sturridge	14
1997–98	Prem	38	16	7	15	52	49	55	9th	R4	R4			(Costa Rica) Paulo Wanchope	17
1998–99	Prem	38	13	13	12	40	45	52	8th	QF	R3			(Jamaica) Deon Burton	12
1999–2000	Prem	38	9	11	18	44	57	38	16th	R3	R3			(Republic of Ireland) Rory Delap	8
2000–01	Prem	38	10	12	16	37	59	42	17th	R4	R4			(England) Malcolm Christie	12
2001–02	Prem	38	8	6	24	33	63	30	19th	R3	R3			(Italy) Fabrizio Ravanelli	11
2002–03	Div 1	46	15	7	24	55	74	52	18th	R3	R2			(England) Malcolm Christie (England) Lee Morris	9
2003–04	Div 1	46	13	13	20	53	67	52	20th	R3	R1			(England) Ian Taylor	12
2004–05	Champ (Note: At the beginning of the 2004–05 season, the Football League renamed its divisions: the First Division (which Derby were playing in) became The Championship, the Second Division became League One and the Third Division became League Two.)	46	22	10	14	71	60	76	4th	R4	R1	League play-offs	SF	(Poland) Grzegorz Rasiak	17
2005–06	Champ	46	10	20	16	53	67	50	20th	R4	R1			(Spain) Iñigo Idiakez	11
2006–07	Champ	46	25	9	12	62	46	84	3rd (Note: Promoted via the play-offs.)	R5	R2	League play-offs	W	(Scotland) Steve Howard	19
2007–08	Prem	38	1	8	29	20	89	11	20th	R4	R2			(Scotland) Kenny Miller	6
2008–09	Champ	46	14	12	20	55	67	54	18th	R5	SF			(England) Rob Hulse	18
2009–10	Champ	46	15	11	20	53	63	56	14th	R5	R1			(England) Rob Hulse	12
2010–11	Champ	46	13	10	23	58	71	49	19th	R3	R1			(Scotland) Kris Commons	13
2011–12	Champ	46	18	10	18	50	58	64	12th	R4	R1			(England) Steve Davies (Jamaica) Theo Robinson	12
2012–13	Champ	46	16	13	17	65	62	61	10th	R4	R1			(Northern Ireland) Jamie Ward	12
2013–14	Champ	46	25	10	11	84	52	85	3rd	R3	R3	League play-offs	R/U	(Scotland) Chris Martin	25
2014–15	Champ	46	21	14	11	85	56	77	8th	R5	R5			(Scotland) Chris Martin	21
2015–16	Champ	46	21	15	10	66	43	78	5th	R4	R1	League play-offs	SF	(Scotland) Chris Martin	15
2016–17	Champ	46	18	13	15	54	50	67	9th	R4	R3			(England) Tom Ince	15
2017–18	Champ	46	20	15	11	69	48	75	6th	R3	R2	League play-offs	SF	(Czech Republic) Matěj Vydra	22
2018–19	Champ	46	20	14	12	69	54	74	6th	R5	R4	League play-offs	R/U	(Wales) Harry Wilson	18
2019–20	Champ	46	17	13	16	62	64	64	10th	R5	R2			(Scotland) Chris Martin (England) Martyn Waghorn	12
2020–21	Champ	46	11	11	24	36	58	44	21st	R3	R2			(Turkey) Colin Kazim-Richards	8
2021–22	Champ	46	14	13	19	45	53	34 (Note: Derby were deducted 21 points, 12 for entering administration & 9 for breaking EFL accountancy rules.)	23rd	R3	R2			(Wales) Tom Lawrence	11
2022–23	L1	46	21	13	12	67	46	76	7th	R4	R3	EFL Trophy	GS	(Republic of Ireland) David McGoldrick	25
2023–24	L1	46	28	8	10	78	37	92	2nd	R1	R1	EFL Trophy	R2	(Republic of Ireland) James Collins	19
2024–25	Champ	46	13	11	22	48	56	50	19th	R3	R2			(England) Jerry Yates	10
2025–26	Champ	46	20	9	17	67	59	69	8th	R3	R2			(England) Carlton Morris	12

== Key ==
Key to league record:

- Pld = Matches played
- W = Matches won
- D = Matches drawn
- L = Matches lost
- GF = Goals for
- GA = Goals against
- Pts = Points
- Pos = Final position

Key to divisions:

- FL = Football League
- Div 1 = Football League First Division
- Div 2 = Football League Second Division
- Div 3 (N) = Football League Third Division (North)
- Div 3 = Football League Third Division
- Prem = Premier League
- Champ = EFL Championship
- L1 = EFL League One

Key to rounds:

- Ban = Banned
- DNQ = Did not qualify for main competition
- GS = Group stage
- PR = Preliminary round
- R1 = Round 1
- R2 = Round 2
- R3 = Round 3
- R4 = Round 4
- R5 = Round 5
- QF = Quarter-finals
- SF = Semi-finals
- R/U = Runners-up
- W = Winners

Champions	Runners-up	Promoted	Relegated
