= Jack Nicholas (disambiguation) =

Jack Nicholas (1910–1977) was an English professional footballer.

Jack Nicholas may also refer to:

- Jack Nicholas (footballer, born 1885) (1885–1934), English footballer

== As a middle name ==
- Jack Nicholas Pritzker (1904–1979), American businessman, member of the Pritzker family
- Jack Agrios (Jack Nicholas Agrios, born 1938), Canadian lawyer
- Jack Cowgill (Jack Nicholas Cowgill, born 1997), English footballer

== See also ==
- Jack Nicklaus (born 1940), American professional golfer
