= Terry Webster =

English footballer (1930–2016)

Personal information
- Full name: Terence Charles Webster
- Date of birth: 9 July 1930
- Place of birth: Doncaster, England
- Date of death: March 2016 (aged 85)
- Position: Goalkeeper

Youth career
- Intake YC, Sheffield
- 1948: Doncaster Rovers

Senior career*
Years	Team	Apps	(Gls)
1948–1958	Derby County	172	(0)
1958–1961	Skegness Town		
- * Club domestic league appearances and goals

Terence Charles Webster (9 July 1930 – March 2016) was an English professional footballer who played as a goalkeeper, most notably for Derby County.

== Career ==
=== Early career ===
Webster, born in Doncaster started playing his football in Intake, Sheffield, before joining the youth setup at Doncaster Rovers in June 1948.

=== Derby County ===
In October 1948, Webster would sign with Derby County. Webster would make his senior league debut in a goalless draw at Deepdale against Preston North End on 5 March 1949. Webster would mainly perform in a role as back-up goalkeeper in his six season at the club as Bill Townsend and Ray Middleton acted as first choice goalkeepers.

In the 1954–55 season, had Middleton left Derby and George Hunter came in as a replacement, but by October 1954, Webster had beat out Hunter to become first choice keeper and played 24 games that season. Derby would though suffer relegation to the third tier of English football for the first time in the clubs history that season.

In the Third Division North, Webster would become undisputed first choice goalkeeper, playing in 45 games in 1955–56 and missing all but one game of Derby's 1956–57 Third Division North title winning campaign. On the clubs return to the Second Division, Webster would play in the clubs first 20 matches of the season, however he then lost his place in the side to Ken Oxford. His last appearance for Derby came in a 3–2 loss to Grimsby Town on 7 December 1957. Webster would leave Derby at the end of the season, and during his ten years at the club made a total of 178 first team appearances.

=== Skegness Town ===
Webster signed for Skegness Town in July 1958. He remained the club until July 1961.

== Death ==
Webster's death was announced by Derby County in March 2016, he died aged 85.

== Career statistics ==
Appearances and goals by club, season and competition
Club	Season	League			FA Cup		Total	
Club	Season	Division	Apps	Goals	Apps	Goals	Apps	Goals
Derby County	1948–49	First Division	14	0	0	0	14	0
Derby County	1949–50	First Division	13	0	0	0	13	0
Derby County	1950–51	First Division	9	0	0	0	9	0
Derby County	1951–52	First Division	0	0	0	0	0	0
Derby County	1952–53	First Division	0	0	0	0	0	0
Derby County	1953–54	Second Division	6	0	0	0	6	0
Derby County	1954–55	Second Division	23	0	1	0	24	0
Derby County	1955–56	Third Division North	42	0	3	0	45	0
Derby County	1956–57	Third Division North	45	0	2	0	47	0
Derby County	1957–58	Second Division	20	0	0	0	20	0
Career total			172	0	6	0	178	0

== Honours ==
Derby County

- Football League Third Division North winner: 1956–57
