= Ray Young (footballer) =

English footballer (1934–2022)

Personal information
- Full name: George Raymond Young
- Date of birth: 14 March 1934
- Place of birth: Derby, England
- Date of death: 27 December 2022 (aged 88)
- Place of death: Derby, England
- Position: Centre-half

Youth career
- 1949–1954: Derby County

Senior career*
| Years | Team | Apps | (Gls) |
| 1954–1966 | Derby County | 254 | (5) |
| 1966–1967 | Heanor Town | | |
| 1967–1968 | Burton Albion | | |
- * Club domestic league appearances and goals

George Raymond Young (14 March 1934 – 27 December 2022) was an English professional footballer who played as centre-half, most notably for his hometown club Derby County.

== Early life and career ==
=== Derby County ===
George Raymond Young was born on 14 March 1934 in Derby, Derbyshire. Young started his career as junior playing for the England schoolboys team, before joining Derby County's youth setup in 1949. Derby had high hopes for the player and he was seen a possible successor to Leon Leuty. Young played in the Derby's Colts team and signed professional terms with the club in March 1951.

After progressing into the reserve team, he had to wait several years to make his first-team debut, which happened following the arrival of manager Tim Ward, who replaced Harry Storer. Young's style of play better suited Ward's tactics, who promoted him as a first-team regular. His senior debut came in a Second Division match against Doncaster Rovers on 16 April 1954, a game which Derby won 3–1. After his first few senior games, Mark Eaton, writing for the Evening Telegraph, praised Young as being a "bright spot" within the central defence position, remarking that he believed Young's performances suggested that he could become a "stylish and dominating centre-half". Young was initially a part-time player for Derby, as he was also in the army, stationed at Aldershot Garrison. His national service call-up had been deferred by two years.

Derby hierarchy expected Young to hold down a regular slot in the team at centre-half, however for the majority of his career he struggle to do so and it was towards the end of his career where this occurred. His main weakness were lack of pace and being prone to errors by sometimes playing too casually. He fell behind the more physical players of Martin McDonnell and Les Moore, who were ahead in the pecking order. In 1957, he requested to be put on the transfer list, after falling behind McDonnell as Derby's first choice pivot. The request was unexpected and reportedly "caused consternation among supporters", given Young's popularity and favourable comparisons to the late former Derby defender Leon Leuty.

Young won the Third Division North in 1956–57 and left the club in September 1966, after losing his place to Bobby Saxton. He made a total of 268 starts and 1 substitute appearance for the club, scoring 5 goals.

=== After Derby County ===
Young joined Heanor Town in September 1966 on a free transfer, after turning down an opportunity to join Hartlepools United, as well as several offers from other clubs. Young had been hopeful of remaining a Football League player, and had an assurance from Heanor Town that they would not block any potential transfers to a League club if the opportunity arose.

He ended his football career at Burton Albion, joining them in May 1967. Albion had tried to sign him midway through the previous season, however his former club Heanor Town set a release price of £1,000. Albion released Young at the end of the season. He played for the first team, though lost his place towards the end of the season.

== Personal life ==
Outside of football, Young was a keen golfer, as well as playing cricket and badminton. In 1960, he was selected by Cheadle Hulme cricket club to play for them professionally for that season. He also completed an apprenticeship in plumbing. He had two children with wife Jean, a boy and a girl.

== Death ==
Young died on 27 December 2022 aged 88, at Derby's Florence Nightingale Community Hospital. His funeral was held in Derby on 30 January 2023.

== Career statistics ==
Appearances and goals by club, season and competition
| Club | Season | League | | | FA Cup | | League Cup | | Total | |
| Club | Season | Division | Apps | Goals | Apps | Goals | Apps | Goals | Apps | Goals |
|---|---|---|---|---|---|---|---|---|---|---|
| Derby County | 1953–54 | Second Division | 4 | 0 | 0 | 0 | — | | 4 | 0 |
| Derby County | 1954–55 | Second Division | 33 | 1 | 1 | 0 | — | | 34 | 1 |
| Derby County | 1955–56 | Third Division North | 5 | 0 | 0 | 0 | — | | 5 | 0 |
| Derby County | 1956–57 | Third Division North | 8 | 0 | 0 | 0 | — | | 8 | 0 |
| Derby County | 1957–58 | Second Division | 6 | 0 | 0 | 0 | — | | 6 | 0 |
| Derby County | 1958–59 | Second Division | 8 | 0 | 0 | 0 | — | | 8 | 0 |
| Derby County | 1959–60 | Second Division | 25 | 0 | 1 | 0 | — | | 26 | 0 |
| Derby County | 1960–61 | Second Division | 29 | 1 | 0 | 0 | 2 | 0 | 31 | 1 |
| Derby County | 1961–62 | Second Division | 13 | 0 | 0 | 0 | 1 | 0 | 14 | 0 |
| Derby County | 1962–63 | Second Division | 35 | 1 | 2 | 0 | 2 | 0 | 39 | 1 |
| Derby County | 1963–64 | Second Division | 38 | 0 | 1 | 0 | 1 | 0 | 40 | 0 |
| Derby County | 1964–65 | Second Division | 39 | 2 | 1 | 0 | 1 | 0 | 41 | 1 |
| Derby County | 1965–66 | Second Division | 11 | 0 | 0 | 0 | 2 | 0 | 13 | 1 |
| Derby County | Total | | 254 | 5 | 6 | 0 | 9 | 0 | 269 | 1 |
| Heanor Town | 1966–67 | Midland Football League | | | | | — | | | |
| Burton Albion | 1967–68 | Southern League Premier Division | | | | | — | | | |
| Career total | | | 254 | 5 | 6 | 0 | 9 | 0 | 269 | 1 |

== Honours ==
Derby County

- Football League Third Division North: 1956–57
