= Jackie Stamps =

English footballer (1918–1991)

Personal information
- Full name: John David Stamps
- Date of birth: 2 December 1918
- Place of birth: Thrybergh, West Riding of Yorkshire, England
- Date of death: 19 November 1991 (aged 72)
- Place of death: Winshill, Staffordshire, England
- Position: Centre-forward

Youth career
- 1936–1937: Silverwood Colliery

Senior career*
Years	Team	Apps	(Gls)
1937–1938	Mansfield Town	1	(0)
1938–1939	New Brighton	11	(5)
1939–1953	Derby County	233	(100)
1953–1954	Shrewsbury Town	22	(4)
1954–1956	Burton Albion	37	(39)
Total		304	(148)

Managerial career
- 1957–1959: Burton Albion
- * Club domestic league appearances and goals

John David Stamps (2 December 1918 – 19 November 1991) was an English footballer who played as a centre-forward, most notably for Derby County. He is best remembered for scoring two goals in the 1946 FA Cup Final for Derby County in a 4–1 win against Charlton Athletic. He started as an amateur with Silverwood Colliery before being signed by Mansfield Town but was released after making just one senior appearance. After signing with New Brighton, his performances attracted interest from top clubs, and in January 1939, he signed with Derby County. He made an immediate impact, scoring two goals on his league debut.

Stamps's career was disrupted by the outbreak of the Second World War, during which he was wounded at Dunkirk and later suffered a severe leg injury while playing for an army team. Despite being told the latter injury could end his career, he made a full recovery and continued to play at a high level. In addition to his wartime service, he became a key player for Derby County and in 1950, finished as their top scorer. After a brief stint at Shrewsbury Town, Stamps transferred to Burton Albion in 1954, where his career was cut short by a serious foot injury in 1955 that led to his early retirement from playing.

Stamps remained involved in football as a coach and later as a manager at Burton Albion. His health began to decline in the 1970s due to deteriorating vision, attributed to repeated heading of the ball during his playing days. His financial struggles were highlighted in 1970 when a public appeal raised funds for him, culminating in a benefit match. He died in 1991 at the age of 72 from cancer.

== Career ==
=== Early life and career ===
John David Stamps was born on 2 December 1918 in Thrybergh, West Riding of Yorkshire. He started his career in 1936 as an amateur with Silverwood Colliery before joining Mansfield Town in October 1937, having been scouted while working as a miner, when it was reported he was playing "exceptionally good games" for the reserve team. He struggled to break in to the first team, making just a single senior appearance for the club, and was released at the end of the season.

He was subsequently signed by New Brighton on a free transfer, with manager William James Sawyer announcing the signing on 11 August 1938. After initially playing for the reserve team, he made his senior debut on 12 November 1938 against Southport, following encouraging performances with the club's reserve team, where he scored 11 goals in 13 matches. By late January 1939, he had scored five league goals in eleven matches and his performances came to the attention of other clubs in the region, including Liverpool.

=== Derby County ===
After attracting interest from clubs such as Everton, Leeds and Newcastle, Stamps joined First Division leaders Derby in January 1939 for a transfer fee reportedly around £2,500, although other sources suggest it was closer to £1,500. He made his league debut in March 1939 against Charlton Athletic, scoring two second-half goals in a 3–1 win. His debut performance was reviewed favourably by Jack Haddon, writing for the Sunday Dispatch, who described him as a "thrustful, go-ahead opportunist who is a mighty useful chap to have on your side". His debut was also viewed favourably by Evening Telegraph writer Charles Mann, who commented that Stamps's performance "brought back a lot of the life to a jaded attack".

During the Second World War, he was wounded at Dunkirk and was one of the last men of the British Expeditionary Force to be evacuated in 1940. He also later severed a ligament in his leg while playing for an army team. Despite being told after the latter injury that it was career ending, he made a quick recovery on both occasions and returned to football. In 1942–43, he made 14 wartime guest appearances for Southampton, scoring 11 goals. He led the attack in Derby's 1946 FA Cup Final win against Charlton Athletic, in which he scored two goals in extra time. He came close to scoring in regular time but the ball burst as he shot, slowly dropping into the hands of Charlton's goalkeeper. It was the first time in a cup final game that a ball had burst. His FA Cup run that season included nine goals in eight matches. In August 1947, Aston Villa enquired about Stamps, to which Derby responded that "£25,000 would not buy him". He finished as Derby's highest scorer in 1950 and as the joint highest scorer in the league that season.

Following a spell on the sidelines due to an ankle injury, Stamps made his return to the starting lineup as centre-forward in a match against Sheffield Wednesday in March 1953. This marked his first start in that position since April of the previous year, with his prior 25 appearances all coming as an inside-left. In October 1953, reports emerged suggesting Stamps was the favourite for the vacant position of chief scout. At this time, he was playing for the reserve team while occasionally coaching. However, Derby quickly dismissed the reports, clarifying that Stamps was serving as a player-coach and assisting with scouting. Stamps was recalled to the starting lineup for Derby's match against league leaders Leicester on 12 December 1953, making only his second league appearance of the season. His sole other league appearance had been in the opening match of the campaign, also against Leicester. Between that time, Stamps had played in the reserve Central League, scoring 11 goals in 15 appearances. He ended his Derby career with 100 league goals in 233 games and 26 goals in 29 FA Cup games.

=== Shrewsbury Town ===
In December 1953, Stamps transferred to Shrewsbury Town for a reported "moderate fee", joining under the management of his former Derby teammate Sammy Crooks. At that time, Crooks had been concerned by the lack of goal scoring and had spent weeks trying to find an experienced forward player. Stamps made his home debut against Swindon Town, where Shrewsbury won their first game in their last twelve. By late January 1954, the signing of Stamps had reportedly improved the club's attack considerably and he was the only forward player to keep his place in the team when they faced Newport County that month. On 23 January, he scored a hat-trick against Norwich City.

Reports surfaced in June 1954 that Stamps had asked for a transfer away from the club, after refusing terms offered to him for the following season. Stamps was reported as saying that he would rather leave football completely than re-sign for Shrewsbury under the terms proposed. On 21 July, it was reported that Stamps had made arrangements to take charge of pre-season training at Matlock Town, planned to start on 8 August. However, just a week later, Burton Albion manager Reg Weston approached Shrewsbury about signing Stamps, which was rejected. Burton Albion had requested the release of Stamps, but Shrewsbury found the offer unacceptable. Despite this, they left the door open for any future satisfactory bids, which Burton could not afford. In early August 1954, it was reported that terms were agreed with Boston United for Stamps's transfer. However, this was denied by Shrewsbury, who indicated that Boston United had merely been given permission to talk to the player. Less than a week later, on 11 August, news surfaced that Burton Albion planned to complete the transfer of Stamps, which was possible after Stamps refused to re-sign for Shrewsbury.

=== Burton Albion ===
Stamps transferred to Burton Albion on 12 August 1954, with the transfer being funded by the Burton Albion Supporters' Club. He made his debut just two days later, on 14 August, in a charity fundraising practice match. Upon joining the club, he was also granted a temporary licence to run the Dog and Partridge Hotel in New Street, Burton.

In the 1954–55 season, Stamps had scored 12 goals (including two penalties) in the Birmingham & District League and 6 goals in cup ties by Christmas. He went on to finish the season as Burton's top scorer, with 39 league goals in 37 appearances, along with seven goals in cup ties. Stamps was appointed as player-coach in June 1955. However, in October, he suffered a serious injury to his left foot during an FA Cup second qualifying round match against Bedworth Town. Twisting awkwardly during a jump just before half-time, he broke five bones and severed several ligaments. Doctors informed him that he would never be able to play football again. Despite the prognosis, he continued coaching at the club and resumed light training in December, however still had pain in his foot and feared he would never be fit enough to play again. He was back in training in March 1956, still hopeful of returning to action, pending the results of an X-ray in May. He officially retired as a player in May 1956, although later made a return to the pitch in October 1956 for a charity match against Derby Corinthians. He was appointed as team-coach in April 1957.

In November 1957, as assistant manager, Stamps took over as caretaker manager following the dismissal of Sammy Crooks. He was offered the role permanently in March 1958, but was asked to tender his resignation just over 18 months later in October 1959 after a poor run of results, with the club facing severe financial difficulties and the threat of collapse.

== After retirement ==
In October 1962, it was reported that Stamps had picked up an ankle injury during a Burton and District F.A. match and was treated at hospital. He later played in another charity game in April 1964 along with fellow Derby County team-mate Ken Oliver.

For many years after leaving Derby County, Stamps remained a supporter, being described by the Evening Telegraph in 1966 as among their "most enthusiastic supporters" and would often wish the team good luck in the dressing room before a game.

== Personal life ==
Stamps began losing his sight around 1970, initially in one eye. Despite over twenty visits to various specialists, none were able to offer a solution. His vision problems were believed to be the result of repeated heading of a football during his playing career. In September 1970, The Sunday People published a feature article to draw attention to Stamps's struggles, shedding light on his financial difficulties as he was surviving on disability and unemployment benefits. Additionally, he received two one-time hardship grants of £50 from the Football Association and the Football League respectively. Former Charlton Athletic goalkeeper Sam Bartram, whom Stamps had scored against in the 1946 FA Cup Final, made attempts to organise a testimonial match to help raise funds and awareness of Stamps's condition. The benefit match took place the following month in October, with Burton Albion playing an all-stars team in front of a crowd of 12,000 at Derby's Baseball Ground. The match raised nearly £5,000 with Bobby Charlton being the standout star. He was elected as honorary vice-president of Derby F.C. in January 1983.

Stamps died on 19 November 1991 at his home in Winshill, Staffordshire, shortly before his 73rd birthday, after losing his battle with cancer. Although blind for the final 20 years of his life, he continued to attend Derby County games. He was remembered fondly by former teammates at Derby County, with Raich Carter highlighting his strength and Tommy Powell describing him as a "gentle giant and a wonderful man". His wife Norah died just the following month, on 27 December 1991.

A pub in Derby city centre, opened in 1998, was named after him but in the early 2000s was changed to a Walkabout bar.

== Career statistics ==
Appearances and goals by club, season and competition
Club	Season	League			FA Cup		Total	
Club	Season	Division	Apps	Goals	Apps	Goals	Apps	Goals
Mansfield Town	1937–38	Third Division South	1	0	0	0	1	0
New Brighton	1938–39	Third Division North	11	5	1	1	12	6
Derby County	1938–39	First Division	8	3	—		8	3
Derby County	1939–40	First Division	0 (Note: Stamps made three appearances, without scoring, for Derby County in the 1939–40 Football League before the season was abandoned after the outbreak of the Second World War.)	0	—		0	0
Derby County	1945–46	—			8	9	8	9
Derby County	1946–47	First Division	40	17	4	2	44	19
Derby County	1947–48	First Division	22	13	6	4	28	19
Derby County	1948–49	First Division	31	11	1	1	32	12
Derby County	1949–50	First Division	37	22	5	7	42	29
Derby County	1950–51	First Division	38	20	3	3	41	23
Derby County	1951–52	First Division	25	4	0	0	25	4
Derby County	1952–53	First Division	30	10	2	0	32	10
Derby County	1953–54	Second Division	2	0	—		2	0
Derby County	Total		233	100	29	26	262	126
Shrewsbury Town	1953–54	Third Division South	22	4	—		22	4
Burton Albion	1954–55	Birmingham & District League	37	39			37	39
Career total			304	148	30	27	334	175

== Honours ==
Derby County

- FA Cup: 1945–46
