= Tommy Powell (English footballer) =

English footballer (1925–1998)

Personal information
- Full name: Thomas Ernest Powell
- Date of birth: 12 April 1925
- Place of birth: Derby, England
- Date of death: 7 September 1998 (aged 73)
- Place of death: Derby, England
- Positions: Winger; inside forward

Youth career
- Derby Corinthians

Senior career*
Years	Team	Apps	(Gls)
1942–1961	Derby County	380	(57)
- * Club domestic league appearances and goals

Thomas Ernest Powell (12 April 1925 – 7 September 1998) was an English professional footballer who played 406 career games as a winger and inside forward for Derby County.

== Early life ==
Powell born in Derby in 1925, first played at the Baseball Ground for his school side, Firs Estate Junior School in a local schools cup final, he later became a pupil at The Bemrose School in the city. He started his playing career at local side Derby Corinthians, before joining Derby County in 1942.

== Footballing career ==
=== Wartime career ===
Powell first played for Derby County on Christmas Day 1941 as a wartime guest player aged 16 whist still a pupil at Bemrose School, he featured alongside future Derby County teammate Chick Musson and Jackie Parr, Derby lost the match 3–1 to a Royal Air Force Football Association XI but the 16-year did impress the over 10,000 spectators at the Baseball Ground with the Derby Evening Telegraph "Tom... a big lad with a long stride, need not feel too downhearted if he felt out of it before the course was run... he did at least get one chance to show that he had a fine shot in his gun", Powell became a regular part of Derby's wartime XIs during the World War II conflict.

=== Derby County ===
Powell was always earmarked to play professional league football for Derby County however the war and a period of National Service prevented Powell from making his league debut until 1948, aged 23 against Huddersfield Town in a First Division match on 25 August, Powell scored twice in this match. Derby finshied third in the top flight during his first season playing for the first team.

However, during the first half of his career, Derby suffered a decline in fortunes which eventually see the club relegated twice two seasons in 1953 and 1955, in 1953, Powell almost left Derby for Hull City in 1953 with the two clubs agreeing a fee of £10,000 for the player, but Powell did not want to leave his hometown club. It was felt Powell could have moved to bigger clubs and had the potential to play for England but his loyalty to his hometown club proved too strong.

In the Third Division North, Powell's skills were rare to see in third tier of English football and during the clubs second season at this level Powell built a great understanding with Ray Straw by helping to play ball in to correct positions which helped Straw on to his way to score 37 league goals in the 1956–57 season which allowed Derby to secure promotion to the Second Division as champions.

Powell would retire from football at the end of the 1960–61 season, though he would return the following season, until an injury against Portsmouth in a League Cup replay in November 1961 forced his career to end for good. He played 406 times Derby County in his career, scoring 64 goals.

== Style of play ==
Powell was described by Derby historian and journalist Gerald Mortimer as a player who lacked strength physically but made up for it with immaculate ball control and who built up good understanding with centre-forwards of where to play the ball to given them the best opportunities to score.

== Later life ==
Powell after retirement would coach and manage several amateur clubs as well as running soccer schools in Derby. He would also later work as an accountant in Abbey Street, as well as for the Derby Evening Telegraph until his retirement.

== Personal life ==
Powell's son, Steve was born in 1955 in Derby and he too would be educated at Bemrose and would play 420 times for Derby, becoming a two time league champion. The father and son duo made a combined 826 appearances for Derby, scoring a combined 85 goals.

== Death ==
Powell died in Derby on 7 September 1998, aged 73 after attending a meeting of disabled Derby supporters at the Baseball Ground.

== Career statistics ==
Appearances and goals by club, season and competition
Club	Season	League			FA Cup		League Cup		Total	
Club	Season	Division	Apps	Goals	Apps	Goals	Apps	Goals	Apps	Goals
Derby County	1948–49	First Division	22	6	4	2	—		26	8
Derby County	1949–50	First Division	21	1	5	4	—		26	5
Derby County	1950–51	First Division	23	2	1	0	—		24	2
Derby County	1951–52	First Division	26	5	2	0	—		27	5
Derby County	1952–53	First Division	23	1	1	0	—		24	1
Derby County	1953–54	Second Division	29	5	0	0	—		29	5
Derby County	1954–55	Second Division	34	8	1	0	—		35	8
Derby County	1955–56	Third Division North	39	12	3	0	—		42	12
Derby County	1956–57	Third Division North	38	1	2	1	—		40	2
Derby County	1957–58	Second Division	38	3	1	0	—		39	3
Derby County	1958–59	Second Division	31	5	2	0	—		33	5
Derby County	1959–60	Second Division	23	1	1	0	—		24	1
Derby County	1960–61	Second Division	30	6	1	0	0	0	31	6
Derby County	1961–62	Second Division	3	1	0	0	2	0	5	1
Career total			380	57	24	7	2	0	406	64

== Honours ==
Derby County

- Football League Third Division North winner: 1956–57
