= Jack Howe (English footballer) =

English footballer and manager

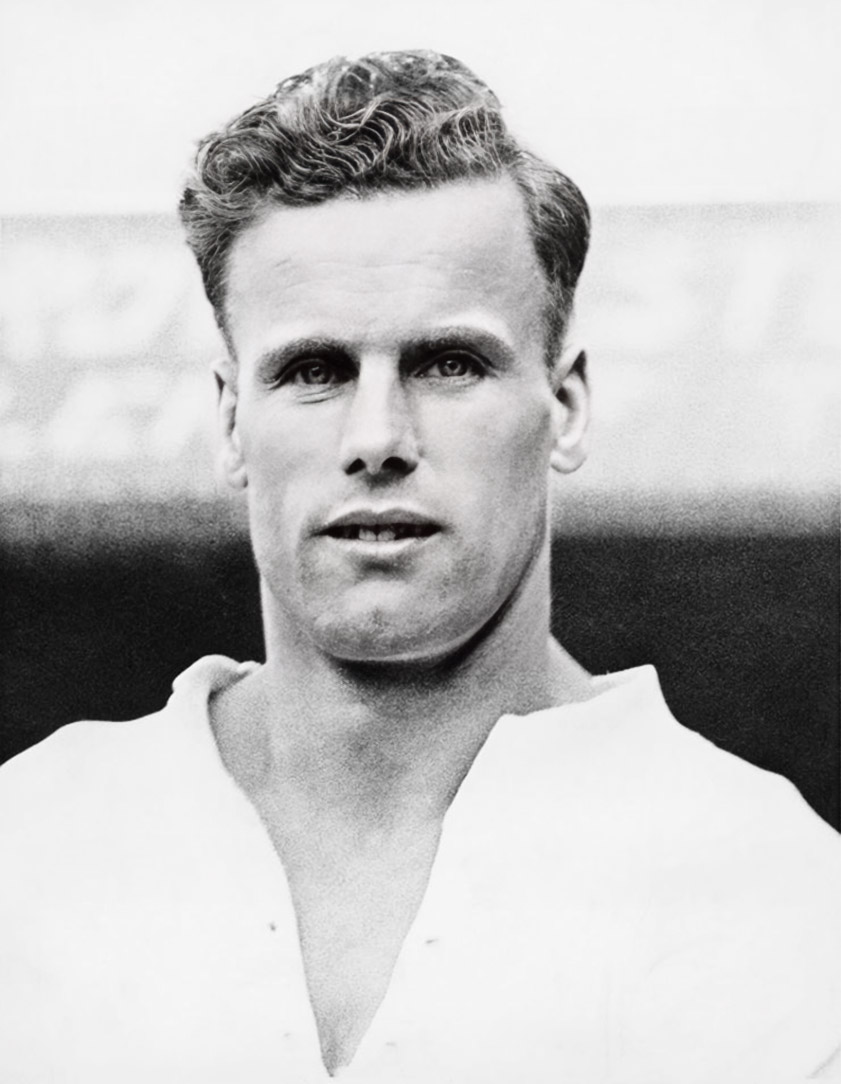

Personal information
- Full name: John Robert Howe
- Date of birth: 7 October 1915
- Place of birth: Hartlepool, England
- Date of death: 5 April 1987 (aged 71)
- Place of death: Hartlepool, England
- Height: 6 ft 0 in (1.83 m)
- Position: Defender

Senior career*
| Years | Team | Apps | (Gls) |
| 1934–1936 | Hartlepools United | 24 | (0) |
| 1936–1949 | Derby County | 223 | (2) |
| 1949–1951 | Huddersfield Town | 29 | (1) |

International career
| 1948–1949 | England | 3 | (0) |

Managerial career
- 1951–1953: King's Lynn
- * Club domestic league appearances and goals

John Robert Howe (7 October 1915 – 5 April 1987) was an English professional footballer who played as a defender and gained three caps for England in the late 1940s. He was a part of the Derby County side that won the 1946 FA Cup Final.

== Playing career ==
=== Early career ===
Howe started his playing career with his hometown club, Hartlepools, with whom he signed for aged 16. He played 16 times in his first season with the club. He was scouted by Arsenal's chief scout, Peter McWilliam, in early 1935, being described as one of Hartlepools' "biggest finds".

=== Derby County ===
==== Early years and war period ====
Howe transferred to Derby County in March 1936. His transfer came about when Derby manager George Jobey attended a Lincoln City match at Sincil Bank, initially to scout another player. However, Howe's performance caught Jobey's eye and he quickly recognised his potential. Impressed by what he saw, Jobey brought Howe back to Derby and signed him that very evening for a reported fee of £750, which was considered a bargain at the time.

Howe made his debut as Derby were finishing eight points behind champions Sunderland and was a regular until the Second World War when he joined the Queen's Own Cameron Highlanders with guest stints at Hearts, Falkirk, Aberdeen and St Mirren. He played for the Scottish League against the British Army. After service in India, he returned in time to play in the FA Cup 1946 semi-final replay, covering for the injured Leon Leuty at centre-half. He won his winners medal after featuring at left back in the Wembley final, covering for an injured Jack Parr who had broken his arm days before the game.

==== Captaincy and transfer rumours ====
Howe was appointed captain in May 1948 following Raich Carter's transfer to Hull. In April 1949, reports emerged suggesting that Derby were willing to release Howe, with their Scottish scout tasked to explore a potential deal with a Scottish club. Howe had expressed a desire to return closer to his homeland in the north of England and was reportedly interviewed by the directors of Mansfield Town for the managerial position in May 1949. In June 1949, he accepted the presidency of Derby Junior Football League for the upcoming season, with several fellow Derby team-mates serving on the committee.

Several months later on 19 October, Gateshead made a formal offer to Howe for their vacant position of player-manager, along with a substantial financial proposal to Derby for his transfer. He was reported to be considering the offer, with Derby giving their approval if he chose to accept. Howe declined the offer around a week later, making his decision known after watching Huddersfield Town play Derby at the Baseball Ground, instead choosing to join Huddersfield for a reported fee of £15,000.

=== Huddersfield Town ===
In October 1949, Howe signed for Huddersfield Town and was described by the Huddersfield Weekly Examiner as being among the country's most experienced defenders. His arrival was seen as a welcome addition to the club which had been struggling defensively. He made his debut against West Brom the following weekend. In 1951, at his own request, Howe was placed on the transfer list, attracting interest from both Hartlepools United and Gateshead, who were keen to secure him as a player-manager. He had previously declined an offer to join Gateshead in the same capacity before making his move to Huddersfield.

=== Late career ===
In August 1951, he was appointed player-manager at King's Lynn who competed in the Eastern Counties League, but resigned from his position at the end of the 1952–1953 season. He remained with the club, playing for the reserves team at centre-half, and also worked as a public house licensee in King's Lynn during the mid-1950s, a position he was reportedly still holding into the 1960s. He also had a spell playing for Sutton Town. He was one of the first professional footballers to wear contact lenses.

== International career ==
Howe made his England debut in 1948 in a 4–0 win against Italy. He went on to make two more appearances for his country, against Scotland and Ireland respectively in 1949. He was described as being a strong two footed defender with good ball distribution.

== Personal life ==
He was married to Eileen Howe and they had two children, Patricia and John. They had four grandchildren Susie, Rob, Steven and Leesa. His grandson, Steve Fletcher also played professionally and is the record appearance holder with AFC Bournemouth.

Howe died at his home in Hartlepool, Cleveland in April 1987, aged 71. He was the fifth member of the 1946 FA Cup winning team to die.

== Career statistics ==
Appearances and goals by club, season and competition
| Club | Season | League | | | FA Cup | | Total | |
| Club | Season | Division | Apps | Goals | Apps | Goals | Apps | Goals |
|---|---|---|---|---|---|---|---|---|
| Hartlepools United | 1934–35 | | | | | | | |
| Hartlepools United | 1935–36 | | | | | | | |
| Hartlepools United | Total | | 24 | | | | | |
| Derby County | 1935–36 | First Division | 2 | | | | | |
| Derby County | 1936–37 | First Division | 31 | | | | | |
| Derby County | 1937–38 | First Division | 39 | | | | | |
| Derby County | 1938–39 | First Division | 30 | | | | | |
| Derby County | 1945–46 | — | | | 2 | 0 | 2 | 0 |
| Derby County | 1946–47 | First Division | 35 | | | | | |
| Derby County | 1947–48 | First Division | 39 | | | | | |
| Derby County | 1948–49 | First Division | 37 | | | | | |
| Derby County | 1949–50 | First Division | 11 | | | | | |
| Derby County | Total | | 223 | 2 | | | 244 | |
| Huddersfield Town | 1949–50 | First Division | 20 | 1 | | | | |
| Huddersfield Town | 1950–51 | First Division | 9 | 0 | | | | |
| Huddersfield Town | Total | | 29 | 1 | | | | |

== Honours ==
Derby County

- FA Cup: 1945–46
