= George Collin =

English footballer (1905–1989)

Personal information
- Full name: George Collin
- Date of birth: 13 September 1905
- Place of birth: Oxhill, Stanley, England
- Date of death: 1 February 1989 (aged 83)
- Place of death: Derby, England
- Height: 5 ft 9 in (1.75 m)
- Position: Left-back

Youth career
- West Stanley

Senior career*
Years	Team	Apps	(Gls)
1924–1925	Arsenal	0	(0)
1925–1927	Bournemouth & Boscombe Athletic	48	(0)
1927–1936	Derby County	309	(0)
1936–1938	Sunderland	31	(0)
1938–1939	Port Vale	1	(0)
1939–19??	Burton Town		
Total		389+	(0+)

Managerial career
- 1939–19??: Burton Town
- * Club domestic league appearances and goals

George Collin (13 September 1905 – 1 February 1989) was an English footballer who played at left-back.

He played for Arsenal, Bournemouth & Boscombe Athletic, Sunderland, Port Vale, and Burton Town, but is most notable for his nine years with Derby County from 1927 to 1936. He helped the "Rams" to finish second in the First Division in 1929–30 and 1935–36.

== Career ==
Collin played for Sunderland based junior club West Stanley, before moving to London in 1924 for a trial with West Ham United. He instead signed a contract with Arsenal, before moving on to Bournemouth & Boscombe Athletic. He suffered a badly broken leg at Dean Court, but managed to return to full fitness.

He joined Derby County in November 1927, with manager George Jobey looking to Collin as a successor to Tom Crilly; this was despite Collin having recently broken his leg. After making his debut for the "Rams", the Derby Telegraph described him as "a class full-back... cool and discriminate". He made 28 appearances in 1927–28, as Derby finished fourth in the First Division. He played 42 games in 1928–29, as the club slipped down to sixth place. He made 35 league appearances in 1929–30, as County finished as the Football League's runners-up, ten points behind champions Sheffield Wednesday. He appeared 41 times in 1930–31, as Derby dropped down to sixth place again. He posted 43 appearances in 1931–32, as the club dropped down to 15th. Derby rose to seventh in 1932–33, with Collin playing 48 games, including the defeat to Manchester City in the semi-finals of the FA Cup. He played 38 games in 1933–34, as Derby once again finished in fourth place. They dropped to sixth position in 1934–35, with Collin putting in 39 appearances. He played 15 league games in 1935–36, as Derby again finished as runners-up, this time finishing eight points behind champions Sunderland. He transferred to Sunderland in June 1936, after losing his first-team place at Derby to future England international Jack Howe. He made a total of 334 senior appearances in his nine seasons at the Baseball Ground.

He played in the 1936 FA Charity Shield, where Sunderland beat Arsenal at Roker Park. The "Black Cats" followed up on their league success by lifting the FA Cup in 1937. However, Collin did not appear in the final. The club finished seventh in the league in 1936–37 and eighth in 1937–38. He signed with Third Division North club Port Vale in June 1938. He made his debut at the Old Recreation Ground on 27 August, in a 3–1 defeat by Aldershot. He was not selected again in the 1938–39 season, and was given a free transfer in April 1939. He later became the player-manager of Midland League club Burton Town.

== Style of play ==
Collin was a reliable left-back and a quick tackler.

== Personal life ==
He married Edith Osborne in the early 1930s. His niece, Valerie Allcock, served as Chairman of the Derby County Supporters Club for over 30 years.

== Career statistics ==
Appearances and goals by club, season and competition
Club	Season	League			FA Cup		Other		Total	
Club	Season	Division	Apps	Goals	Apps	Goals	Apps	Goals	Apps	Goals
Arsenal	1923–24	First Division	0	0	0	0	0	0	0	0
Bournemouth & Boscombe Athletic	1925–26	Third Division South	37	0	5	0	0	0	42	0
Bournemouth & Boscombe Athletic	1926–27	Third Division South	11	0	3	0	0	0	14	0
Bournemouth & Boscombe Athletic	Total		48	0	8	0	0	0	56	0
Derby County	1927–28	First Division	28	0	0	0	0	0	28	0
Derby County	1928–29	First Division	39	0	3	0	0	0	42	0
Derby County	1929–30	First Division	35	0	3	0	0	0	38	0
Derby County	1930–31	First Division	40	0	1	0	0	0	41	0
Derby County	1931–32	First Division	40	0	3	0	0	0	43	0
Derby County	1932–33	First Division	42	0	6	0	0	0	48	0
Derby County	1933–34	First Division	34	0	4	0	0	0	38	0
Derby County	1934–35	First Division	36	0	3	0	0	0	39	0
Derby County	1935–36	First Division	15	0	2	0	0	0	17	0
Derby County	Total		309	0	25	0	0	0	334	0
Sunderland	1936–37	First Division	31	0	1	0	1	0	33	0
Port Vale	1938–39	Third Division South	1	0	0	0	0	0	1	0
Career total			389	0	34	0	1	0	424	0

== Honours ==
Sunderland

- FA Charity Shield: 1936
