= George Lawrence (footballer, born 1889) =

English footballer (1889–1959)

Personal information
- Full name: George Harold Lawrence
- Date of birth: 10 March 1889
- Place of birth: Basford, England
- Date of death: 1 March 1959 (aged 69)
- Place of death: Derby, England
- Position: Goalkeeper

Youth career
- Manners Rangers
- 1909–1910: Ilkeston United

Senior career*
Years	Team	Apps	(Gls)
1910–1924	Derby County	137	(0)
1924–1925	Bristol City		
1925–1926	Lincoln City		
- Ilkeston United
- * Club domestic league appearances and goals

George Harold Lawrence (3 March 1889 – 1 March 1959) was an English professional footballer who played as a goalkeeper, most notably for Derby County.

== Career ==
=== Early career ===
Lawrence spent his junior career playing for Manners Rangers, before joining Ilkeston United in September 1909.

=== Derby County ===
In May 1910, Lawrence would sign for Derby County, where he would make his senior football debut against Blackpool on 17 September 1910 in the Second Division.

For his first four seasons at the club, Lawrence would play the role as backup goalkeeper to first choice keeper Ernald Scattergood, which restricted his appearances for the first team in the First Division, four league appearances in 1912–13 and nine in 1913–14. The club would get relegated in 1914. It wouldn't be until 1914 when Lawrence would take on the role as first choice goalkeeper, he played a major part in Derby's 1914–15 Second Division league championship, playing in 31 league matches that season.

World War I would then postpone league football for four seasons, and Lawrence would serve the country during the conflict. When league football resumed would retain his role as first choice Derby goalkeeper for another three seasons, playing 32 times in 1919–20. In September 1920 there were reports that Lawrence requested to be replaced on the transfer list by Derby but these reports were dismissed by the club and local newspaper Derby Evening Telegraph. Lawrence would play 28 times in 1920–21, where the club would suffer relegation again. and 23 times in 1921–22. In this season, Derby would play Coventry City at Highfield Road in November 1921, the first league meeting between the two sides, which was forced to be abandoned after half an hour with no score due to heavy fog. For the 1922–23 season Ben Olney would take over as first choice keeper. Lawrence played 7 times in 1922–23, and once in 1923–24. Lawrence featured mainly for the reserves during this period. Lawrence left Derby in the summer of 1924 and during his 14 years at the club, Lawrence made 145 first team appearances.

=== Post Derby County ===
Lawrence would then join Bristol City in August 1924, where he would play 14 times and then spent the 1925–26 season at Lincoln City, where he would play 7 times, before returning to Ilkeston United in the summer of 1926.

== Death ==
Lawrence died on 1 March 1959, aged 69 in Derby.

== Career statistics ==
Appearances and goals by club, season and competition
Club	Season	League			FA Cup		Total	
Club	Season	Division	Apps	Goals	Apps	Goals	Apps	Goals
Derby County	1910–11	Second Division	2	0	0	0	2	0
Derby County	1911–12	Second Division	0	0	0	0	0	0
Derby County	1912–13	First Division	4	0	0	0	0	0
Derby County	1913–14	First Division	9	0	2	0	11	0
Derby County	1914–15	Second Division	31	0	1	0	32	0
Derby County	1919–20	First Division	32	0	2	0	34	0
Derby County	1920–21	First Division	28	0	3	0	31	0
Derby County	1921–22	Second Division	23	0	0	0	23	0
Derby County	1922–23	Second Division	7	0	0	0	7	0
Derby County	1923–24	Second Division	1	0	0	0	1	0
Career total			137	0	8	0	145	0

== Honours ==
Derby County

- Football League Second Division champions: 1914–15
