= Bill Townsend (footballer) =

English footballer and manager (1922–1988)

Personal information
- Full name: William Townsend
- Date of birth: 27 December 1922
- Place of birth: Bedworth, England
- Date of death: 21 December 1988 (aged 65)
- Place of death: Thornton-Cleveleys, England
- Position: Goalkeeper

Youth career
- Nuneaton Borough
- 1939–1942: Derby County

Senior career*
Years	Team	Apps	(Gls)
1942–1953	Derby County	79	(0)
1953–1957	Burton Albion		
1957–1959	Banbury Spencer		
1959–1960	Burton Albion		

Managerial career
- 1959–1960: Burton Albion (player-manager)
- 1960–1962: Burton Albion
- * Club domestic league appearances and goals

William Townsend (27 December 1922 – 21 December 1988) was an English football player and manager. A goalkeeper he played for Nuneaton Borough, before moving to Derby County as a wartime guest, then becoming a professional player, he would then end his career at Burton Albion and Banbury Spencer. He would later return to Burton Albion as a player and later manager.

== Career ==
=== Early career ===
Townsend started his footballing career as a teenager at home town Nuneaton Borough before joining Derby County in 1939 as a wartime guest player. He signed a professional deal in 1942 and became a regular member of the Derby side during the war.

=== Derby County ===
After World War II ended, Townsend made his Derby senior debut on 2 March 1946, in a FA Cup quarter final tie against Aston Villa in front of 74,588 fans at Villa Park. Towsend would play in the 2nd leg a week later which ended in a 1–1 draw at the Baseball Ground. However Vic Woodley was not eligible to play in the games against Villa would play in the semi-final and the 1946 FA Cup final, so Townsend missed out on a winners medal.

As league football returned the following season, Townsend would start as third choice keeper behind Woodley and Alick Grant. In 1947–48, Woodley and Grant would both leave Derby and Townsend had three seasons where he came first choice goalkeeper. Injuries however hit Townsend's time at Derby County and he missed Derby's 1947–48 FA Cup semi final loss against Manchester United. Terry Webster and Harry Brown took over goalkeeping duties and when Ray Middleton joined in 1951, Townsend went two years and nine months without making a first team appearance. Townsend would play four games in 1953, with his last game for Derby being in a 1–1 draw against Charlton Athletic on 7 February 1953. Townsend left Derby in July 1953, he played 93 times for Derby, 79 times in the Football League.

=== Later career ===
Townsend would join Staffordshire club Burton Albion in July 1953, he played in Burton's 0–0 FA Cup third draw against Halifax Town where he made a string of impressive saves despite injuring a shoulder in the game. In June 1957, Townsend would join Banbury Spencer. He played for Banbury for two seasons.

== Managerial career ==
Townsend would return to Burton Albion in September 1959, as player-manager, Townsend would retire as a player in 1960 and he made 204 appearances in his two spells as a player. Townsend would remain as manager of Burton until October 1962.

== Personal life ==
After leaving Derby, Townsend became landlord of the Smiths' Arms in Branston.

== Death ==
Townsend died 21 December 1988, six days short of his 66th birthday in Thornton-Cleveleys.

== Honours ==
In 2021, Townsend was posthumously inducted into the Burton Albion Hall of Fame.
