= Jack Nicholas =

English footballer and manager

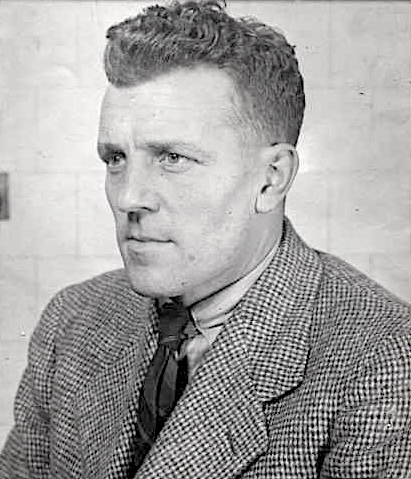

Personal information
- Full name: John Thomas Nicholas
- Date of birth: 26 November 1910
- Place of birth: Derby, England
- Date of death: 8 February 1977 (aged 66)
- Place of death: Nottingham, England
- Positions: Wing half; right back

Youth career
- –1926: Swansea Town
- 1926–1928: Derby County

Senior career*
| Years | Team | Apps | (Gls) |
| 1928–1947 | Derby County | 347 | (14) |
| Total | | 347 | (14) |

Managerial career
- 1942–1944: Derby County
- * Club domestic league appearances and goals

John Thomas Nicholas (26 November 1910 – 8 February 1977) was an English professional footballer who played as a wing half and right back for Derby County. After relocating to Wales with his family at a young age, he took up football and later captained the Welsh Schoolboys team.

In 1926, he signed as a youth player for Derby at aged 16, after Swansea Town declined his request for a professional contract. He made 347 league appearances for Derby between 1928 and 1947, debuting as a right-half and later transitioning to right-back. Nicholas also served as caretaker manager and player-manager during World War II and captained the team during their 1946 FA Cup Final victory. During the war, he also served with the Derby Borough Police.

After retiring in 1948 following an injury, he joined Derby's scouting team, eventually becoming chief scout and contributing to the recruitment of notable players. In 1957, he accepted a scouting role with Nottingham Forest, while also working as a salesman.

== Career ==
=== Youth career ===
After moving to South Wales aged two, Nicholas followed in the footsteps of his father, also called Jack Nicholas, in pursuing a football career. He went on to captain the Welsh Schoolboys team, an achievement he later recounted as one of his greatest honours. Having played for a several years, he graduated to amateur status for Swansea Town. However, when he sought a professional contract, the club declined. Shortly after, while attending a family wedding in Derby, his father met former Derby County manager George Jobey and club secretary Billy Moore. This encounter led to discussions about his future at Swansea and ultimately resulted in an invitation for him to join Derby County.

=== Senior career ===
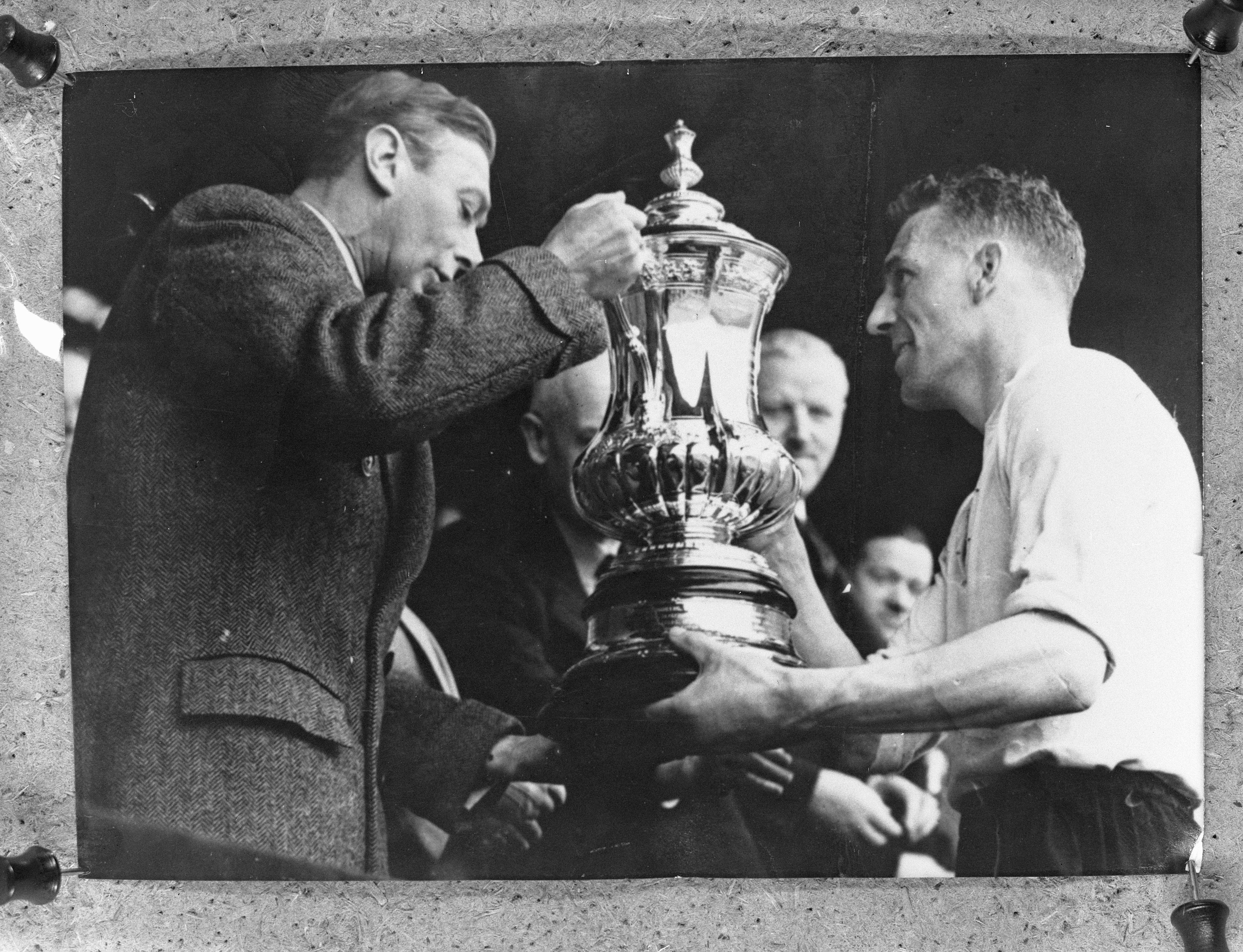
King George VI presents the FA Cup to Nicholas after the 1946 final

After signing as a youth player from Swansea in 1926, Nicholas spent his entire professional career with Derby County, making 347 appearances for them in the Football League between 1928 and 1947. His senior debut came in December 1928 against Blackburn Rovers, covering at right-half for the injured Johnny McIntyre. He made the position his own the following season after McIntyre transferred to Chesterfield, later moving to right-back in 1934 when Tom Cooper joined Liverpool.

Nicholas spent time as the club's caretaker manager and unofficially as a player-manager during the war. He played right-back during World War II and occasionally filled in as goalkeeper. He helped build the squad which he would later captain to victory in the 1946 FA Cup Final. However, during the 1946–1947 season, he suffered a thigh injury and ultimately decided to retire at the end of the following season, despite interest from several clubs, including Notts County, who attempted to persuade him against retirement.

=== After retirement ===
From 1948, he joined the scouting team for Derby and helped bring in players such as Jack Parry and Ray Young. By 1952, he was reported as Derby's chief scout. In 1957, he applied for the position of manager at Burton Albion. That same year, during a chance meeting with friend Billy Walker, he was offered a job on the scouting team of Nottingham Forest, later becoming their chief scout into the 1960s. Nicholas also held a job as a salesman alongside his scouting role.

== Outside football ==
During World War II, Nicholas joined the Derby Borough Police Force, after a period of serving with them as a special constable. In April 1940, he played a charity match for Derby Police against Chesterfield Police, with raised funds going towards war charities.

== Personal ==
Nicholas's father Jack Nicholas was also a former Derby County player at full-back and he later became Derby's head of ground staff. His father died in 1934, aged 49.

Nicholas died on 8 February 1977 at the age of 66, leaving a widow and two children.

== Honours ==
Derby County

- FA Cup: 1945–46
