= William Carr (footballer, born 1901) =

English footballer (1901–1990)

Personal information
- Full name: William Patterson Carr
- Date of birth: 6 November 1901
- Place of birth: Cambois, England
- Date of death: April 1990 (aged 88)
- Place of death: Derby, England
- Position: Full-back

Youth career
- Seaton Delaval

Senior career*
Years	Team	Apps	(Gls)
1924–1933	Derby County	102	(0)
1935–1937	Queens Park Rangers	28	
1937-1938	Barrow		
- * Club domestic league appearances and goals

William Patterson Carr (6 November 1901 – April 1990) was an English professional footballer who played as a full-back, most notably for Derby County.

== Career ==
Born in Cambois, Carr grew up in the North East and played football locally at Seaton Delaval, before being signed by professional Football League club Derby County in February 1924. He received early praise during his first month at Derby, being described as a "fine recruit" and a "rare talent". Originally signed as a right-half, Carr converted to a full-back, making his first appearance in the role for Derby in December 1926. During 1928, Carr could have transferred to Bradford City, though the club were unable to afford the player.

At Derby, Carr made 109 appearances and helped their promotion to the First Division in the 1925–26 season. He also helped the club finish runners-up in the 1929–30 league championship.

After leaving Derby, Carr joined Queens Park Rangers at the start of the 1935 season and had a short spell at Barrow before retiring.

== Death ==
Carr died in April 1990, aged 88 in Derby.
