= Ken Oxford =

English footballer

Personal information
- Full name: Kenneth Oxford
- Date of birth: 14 November 1929
- Place of birth: Oldham, Lancashire, England
- Date of death: 6 August 1993 (aged 63)
- Place of death: Nottingham, Nottinghamshire, England
- Position: Goalkeeper

Youth career
- Manchester City

Senior career*
Years	Team	Apps	(Gls)
1947–1948	Manchester City	1	(0)
1953–1958	Norwich City	128	(0)
1958–1963	Derby County	151	(0)
1964–1965	Doncaster Rovers	16	(0)
1965	Port Vale	0	(0)
1965–196?	Boston United		
Total		296+	(0)
- * Club domestic league appearances and goals

Kenneth Oxford (14 November 1929 – 6 August 1993) was an English footballer. A goalkeeper, he played 296 league games in an 18-year career in the Football League. He spent time with Manchester City, Norwich City, Derby County, Doncaster Rovers, Port Vale, and Boston United. He helped Boston to win the West Midlands (Regional) League in the 1966–67 season.

== Career ==
Oxford started his career by winning a contract at Manchester City, playing one First Division game at Maine Road in the 1947–48 season. He later had a non-playing spell at Chesterfield. He eventually ended up with Norwich City, who finished seventh in the Third Division South in 1953–54. Norman Low's "Canaries" finished in joint-11th place in 1954–55. Oxford was selected to play for the Third Division South representative side on 16 March 1955 and kept a clean sheet in a 2–0 victory over their Northern counterparts. Norwich then finished seventh in 1955–56, before finishing in last place in 1956–57. New boss Archie Macaulay then took Norwich to eighth spot in 1957–58. In his five years at Carrow Road, Oxford played 128 league games. He moved on to Derby County, who ended the 1958–59 campaign in seventh place in the Second Division. Harry Storer's "Rams" went on to finish 18th in 1959–60, 12th in 1960–61, and 16th in 1961–62. New manager Tim Ward took County to 18th in 1962–63 and 13th in 1963–64. During his five years at the Baseball Ground, Oxford made 151 league appearances. He spent the 1964–65 season with Bill Leivers's Doncaster Rovers, and made 16 Fourth Division in a brief stay at Belle Vue. In March 1965, he moved on to Jackie Mudie's Port Vale. He never played a game for the "Valiants", and remained on the sidelines as Jimmy O'Neill kept his first-team place as the club were relegated out of the Third Division. He left Vale Park on a free transfer to Boston United in May 1965.

== Post-retirement ==
After leaving the game, Oxford became a security guard. He died of a heart attack on 6 August 1993.

== Career statistics ==
Appearances and goals by club, season and competition
Club	Season	League			FA Cup		Other		Total	
Club	Season	Division	Apps	Goals	Apps	Goals	Apps	Goals	Apps	Goals
Manchester City	1947–48	First Division	1	0	0	0	—		1	0
Norwich City	1953–54	Third Division South	21	0	4	0	—		25	0
Norwich City	1954–55	Third Division South	17	0	0	0	—		17	0
Norwich City	1955–56	Third Division South	39	0	3	0	—		42	0
Norwich City	1956–57	Third Division South	32	0	1	0	—		33	0
Norwich City	1957–58	Third Division South	19	0	0	0	—		19	0
Norwich City	Total		128	0	8	0	0	0	136	0
Derby County	1957–58	Second Division	22	0	1	0	—		23	0
Derby County	1958–59	Second Division	38	0	2	0	—		40	0
Derby County	1959–60	Second Division	30	0	1	0	—		31	0
Derby County	1960–61	Second Division	17	0	0	0	0	0	17	0
Derby County	1961–62	Second Division	17	0	0	0	3 (Note: Appearances in League Cup)	0	20	0
Derby County	1962–63	Second Division	27	0	2	0	2	0	31	0
Derby County	Total		151	0	6	0	5	0	162	0
Doncaster Rovers	1964–65	Fourth Division	16	0	2	0	3	0	21	0
Port Vale	1964–65	Third Division	0	0	0	0	0	0	0	0
Boston United	1966–67	West Midlands (Regional) League	39	0	4	0	5	0	48	0
Career total			335	0	20	0	13	0	368	0

== Honours ==
Boston United

- West Midlands (Regional) League: 1966–67
