= Syd Plackett =

English footballer

Personal information
- Full name: Everard Vernon Sydney Plackett
- Date of birth: 21 September 1896
- Place of birth: Loughborough, England
- Date of death: 1949 (aged 52–53)
- Position: Wing half

Senior career*
Years	Team	Apps	(Gls)
1914–1915	Sawley United Church		
1919–1920	Sawley Discharged Soldiers Federation		
1921–1927	Derby County	140	(3)
1927–1930	Notts County	84	(0)
Total		224	(3)
- * Club domestic league appearances and goals

Everard Vernon Sydney Plackett (21 September 1896 – 1949) was an English footballer who played in the Football League for Derby County and Notts County.
