= William James Sawyer =

English football manager

William James Sawyer (1870–1940) was born in Liverpool. Better known simply as "WJ" or Bill to friends. He was an accountant who rose to be Secretary of the Leeds-Liverpool Canal Company. He played a prominent role in footballing circles on Merseyside over a 30-year period. He was instrumental in the formation of South Liverpool F.C., which in 1914 played the likes of Tranmere Rovers F.C., Chester City F.C., Accrington Stanley and others. He was Hon. Secretary/Manager of Everton F.C. in 1918-19 (until stepping down due to work commitments) - steering the club through tricky times as World War I ended. He remained on the Everton Board for a decade and chaired the Financial Committee. In 1925 he was involved in bringing Willian "Dixie" Dean to the club. Mr Sawyer also assisted in the formation of Wigan Borough FC (forerunner of Wigan Athletic). In 1933, he became Secretary-Manager at New Brighton A.F.C., who were South Liverpool FC, who relocated to New Brighton, guiding them to relative success over a 7-year period.

Known to be a "bon-viveur", he had twin sons in 1895 Daniel and William Herbert. William Herbert later served as President of the Everton Shareholders Federation.

WJ died on 27 June 1940 and is buried in Anfield Cemetery.
