= Geoff Barrowcliffe =

English footballer

Personal information
- Full name: Geoffrey Barrowcliffe
- Date of birth: 18 October 1931
- Place of birth: Little Eaton, Derbyshire
- Date of death: 26 September 2009 (aged 77)
- Place of death: Ilkeston, England
- Position: Full-back

Senior career*
Years	Team	Apps	(Gls)
–1950	Ilkeston Town		
1950–1966	Derby County	475	(37)
1966–1967	Boston United	41	(11)
- * Club domestic league appearances and goals

Geoff Barrowcliffe (18 October 1931 – 26 September 2009) was an English professional footballer who played as a fullback in The Football League for Derby County, and also played for several non-league clubs.

Barrowcliffe began his career at non-league Ilkeston Town, before being signed by Derby in October 1950. He spent the next 16 years at the Baseball Ground, and played 475 league games for the Rams. He also scored 37 goals for the club, most of them from the penalty spot.

He left Derby at the end of the 1965–66, and joined Boston United, where he played 41 games and scored 11 goals.

He later played for Heanor Town, Moor Green Colliery, Kimberley Town and Long Eaton United and managed Kimberley Town and Radford.

Barrowcliffe died in Ilkeston on 26 September 2009, at age 77. He had been suffering from Alzheimer's disease. Minute silences were observed before both Derby County's Championship game against Sheffield Wednesday on 3 October and a friendly between Derby and Ilkeston Town on 5 October.
