= Chick Musson =

English footballer

Personal information
- Birth name: Walter Urban Musson
- Date of birth: 8 October 1920
- Place of birth: Kilburn, England
- Date of death: 22 April 1955 (aged 34)
- Place of death: Loughborough, England
- Height: 5 ft 8 in (1.73 m)
- Position: Wing half

Youth career
- 19xx–1936: Holbrook St. Michael's
- 1936–1942: Derby County

Senior career*
Years	Team	Apps	(Gls)
1942–1954	Derby County	246	(0)
1954–1955	Loughborough Brush		

Managerial career
- 1954–1955: Loughborough Brush
- * Club domestic league appearances and goals

Walter Urban "Chick" Musson (8 October 1920 – 22 April 1955) was an English professional footballer who played as a wing half, most notably for Derby County. He later became player-manager of Loughborough Brush before his death in 1955.

== Career ==
=== Derby County ===
Born in Kilburn, Musson played non-league football for Holbrook St. Michael's, before signing with Derby County as an amateur in March 1936, aged 15. He became a first-team regular following his senior debut in 1942, and during his time was unchallenged in his role of left-half. In 1951, he succeeded Tim Ward as club captain, following the former's move to Barnsley, however suffered an injury that same year in a tour game against Holland, which kept him out of the team for most of the season. He later lost the captaincy after the first four games of the 1953–54 season.

He would spend eight seasons in the Football League with Derby County, where he made 246 appearances. During his time at the club, Musson received two benefit matches, in 1950 and 1953 respectively, the latter earning him £750.

=== Loughborough Brush ===
After leaving Derby in June 1954, he became player-manager of Loughborough Brush, making his debut the following August against Bedworth Town.

== Personal life ==
He was a regular member of the Derby County cricket team, as well as playing in Border League games.

The Evening Telegraph reported on 14 April 1955 that Musson had been admitted to Loughborough General Hospital with a blood complaint. He later died on 22 April 1955 from a serious kidney condition. He was survived by his wife and two children. Several members of the 1946 FA Cup Final team attended the funeral on 26 April, two of whom were pallbearers. Over 200 people were at the church, while crowds gathered outside. He became the first player of the cup final team to die.

== Honours ==
Derby County

- FA Cup: 1945–46
