= Leon Leuty =

English footballer (1920–1955)

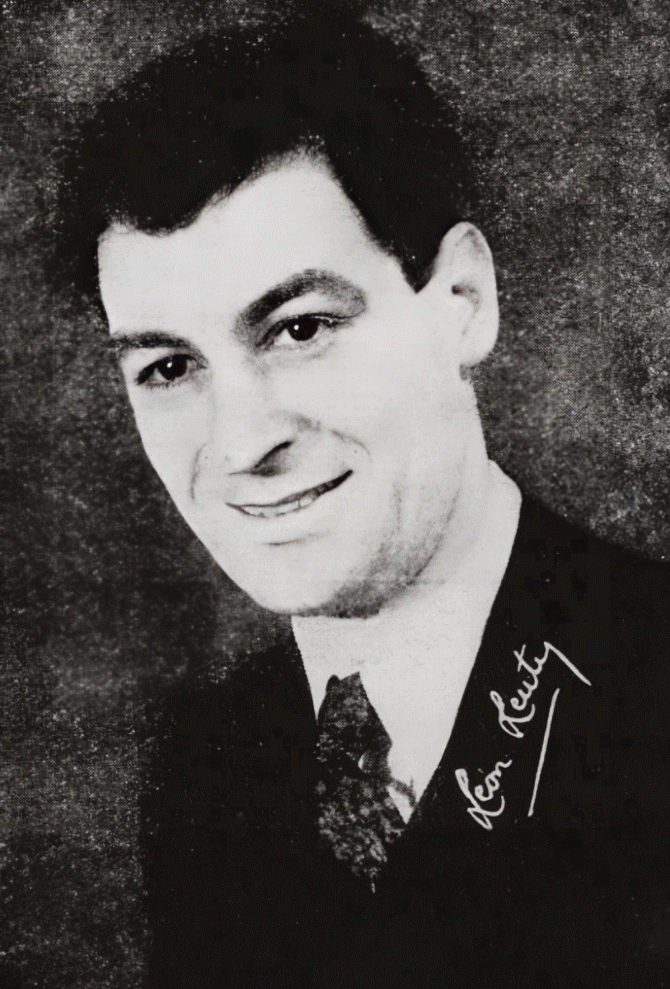
- Leuty in 1950

Personal information
- Full name: Leon Harry Leuty
- Date of birth: 23 October 1920
- Place of birth: Shrewsbury, England
- Date of death: 19 December 1955 (aged 35)
- Place of death: Nottingham, England
- Height: 5 ft 11 in (1.80 m)
- Position: Centre-half

Youth career
- Derby Corinthians
- 1938–1945: Derby County
- → Notts County (wartime guest)
- Rolls-Royce Welfare

Senior career*
| Years | Team | Apps | (Gls) |
| 1945–1950 | Derby County | 131 | (1) |
| 1950 | Bradford (Park Avenue) | 19 | (0) |
| 1950–1955 | Notts County | 188 | (3) |
| Total | | 338 | (4) |

International career
| | England B | 5 | |
- * Club domestic league appearances and goals

Leon Harry Leuty (23 October 1920 – 19 December 1955) was an English professional footballer who played as a centre-half, most notably for Derby County and Notts County. Leuty had originally played as an inside-right during his youth, where he became locally recognised. He also earned the Hoare Cricket Trophy for his cricket performances aged 13.

He undertook an engineering apprenticeship with Rolls-Royce, where he stayed for nine years. Despite originally not expecting a football career, Leuty signed as an amateur for Derby County before the outbreak of the Second World War. He played for Notts County as a wartime guest but gave up on his football aspirations following injuries, yet was persuaded to rejoin under manager Frank Womack's coaching.

After the war, Leuty signed a professional contract with Derby County and was part of the 1946 FA Cup final winning team. He faced challenges in his later years at Derby, expressing dissatisfaction with the club's handling of his fitness concerns. In March 1950, he transferred to Bradford (Park Avenue) for a then-noteworthy fee exceeding £20,000, and later that season to Notts County for a similar sum. Leuty faced unsettled periods at Notts County and at one time considered leaving, but became encouraged with the appointment of manager George Poyser.

Despite featuring for the England national B team and being in reserve in several senior international games, he never received a cap for the senior team. Leuty became ill in late 1955 and died in hospital in December 1955 from lymph sarcoma. His death prompted fundraising efforts through charity and testimonial matches, providing financial support to his widow and two children.

== Early life ==
Leon Harry Leuty was born on 23 October 1920 in Meole Brace, Shrewsbury, before he relocated with his family to Derby around the age of three. Described as shorter than the average height, Leuty had a friendly personality and a chubby face. His first experience in football took place at Pear Tree school, where he initially played as a goalkeeper. He recalled losing his first game by conceding eight goals, leading him to abandon the goalkeeper position. After moving to a local church school, he began playing as an inside-right before moving into a defensive position.

As he began to become recognised locally, he played in numerous trial matches at international level. He secured a position on the Derby Boys team at the age of ten, where he played for around three seasons. In September 1934, aged 13, he was recognised for his performances in schoolboy team cricket and was awarded the Hoare Cricket Trophy.

== Early career ==
Leuty never intended upon a professional football career. He chose an engineering apprenticeship with Rolls-Royce, following in the footsteps of his father. He ultimately spent around nine years with the company. During his apprenticeship, he had unsuccessful trials with Bolton Wanderers and Chesterfield during the 1937–38 season. Leuty signed as an amateur for Derby County in the 1938–39 season, after being spotted by them while playing for Derby Corinthians. Shortly before the outbreak of war, while playing for Derby's third team, he damaged his knee, requiring cartilage surgery. During his recovery, he played some games for Rolls-Royce Welfare.

== Club career ==
=== Derby County ===
During the Second World War, while employed as a Rolls-Royce engineer, he accepted an opportunity to play with Notts County as a wartime guest. The unavailability of Derby's Baseball Ground, requisitioned by the military during the early war years, prevented Leuty from playing for his home team. After sustaining another cartilage injury, he initially abandoned his football ambitions to prioritise his work at Rolls-Royce for the war effort. However, Notts County's manager, Frank Womack, later persuaded him to rejoin football to sustain his team. Having played in various positions during his youth, it was only while at Notts County that he became comfortable in the centre-half position, under the coaching of Womack. His performances caught the attention of Derby, who recalled him under rules that governed amateur players at the time. On his debut for Derby's first team as an amateur, they won a record 10–0 against Mansfield Town. He proceeded to play in Derby's next game before returning to Notts County for the remainder of the season, where he defeated his parent club in a cup-tie game.

He signed a professional contract with Derby County in May 1945 and played in the 1946 FA Cup final winning team. While with Derby, he made several international tours, the first time to Germany around 1945 to play a Royal Air Force team. At the end of the following season, he travelled to Czechoslovakia with Derby as holders of the FA Cup, where he first experienced playing against foreign teams. By late 1949, reports circulated about Leuty's desire on a transfer from Derby, although neither player nor club commented. He confirmed the rumours several years later, by that time having left Derby, disputing reports that he wished to leave due to wanting to have a "full benefit", but rather by discontent with the club's expectations during periods of unfitness. Despite multiple hospitalisations and expressing his lack of readiness to play, Leuty felt disregarded by the club and sought a move upon recovery.

=== Bradford (Park Avenue) ===
In early March 1950, Derby announced their willingness to listen to offers for Leuty. Bradford (Park Avenue), facing the threat of relegation, expressed interest and submitted a bid for around £20,000, sending two club directors to meet personally with Leuty. At this time, Leuty was described by the Bradford Observer as being "one of the country's best centre-half backs". Despite rival bids, including a matching offer from Sunderland, he initially hesitated to join Bradford. He later expressed that he had concerns about leaving the First Division, especially as Bradford at the time were fighting relegation in the Second Division, as well as uncertainty around relocating away from home, where he planned to marry. Described by The Nottingham Guardian as one of the best centre-halves in the country, Leuty ultimately succumbed to the persuasion of Bradford manager Fred Emery and signed with the club.

Bradford ultimately signed Leuty for a fee exceeding £24,000, at the time believed to be the second highest fee for a player, behind the £26,000 paid by Preston North End for Eddie Quigley the same season. Despite Leuty's contributions, Bradford couldn't avoid relegation that season. The club exhibited decency by not hindering Leuty's transfer when the opportunity arose shortly after his arrival. Unsettled at Bradford, Leuty opted to transfer to Notts County in autumn 1950, the club where he had previously played as a wartime guest. The estimated £25,000 fee, considered substantial at the time, positioned Leuty as one of the most expensive players when considering aggregate prices.

=== Notts County ===
Making his debut against Preston North End in September 1950, he quickly made an impact, earning praise for helping Notts County secure points and praised by the Football Post as "playing at the top of his form". In November 1951, he assumed the role of team captain after Tommy Lawton stepped down.

In August 1953, reports surfaced of Leuty's desire to leave Notts County. At that time, the club was fighting against relegation and were struggling to score goals. Leuty was tried as a centre-forward in an experimental single game against Everton in September 1953, due to the poor form of forward Cec McCormack. Further reports emerged in October 1953 of Leuty's request for a transfer, having been dropped from the team and with the club bottom of the league table. Reflecting on that period two years later, he recalled disillusionment with the club's situation, citing unrest in the dressing room and a lack of managerial stability. The subsequent appointment of George Poyser as manager rejuvenated the team and won their respect. Towards the end of 1953, his form had improved and was attracting interest from several Division 1 clubs, yet the manager insisted the club needed him. His previous desire to leave cost him the captaincy.

From early 1955, Leuty had a regular feature in the Derby Evening Telegraph, discussing his career and future ambitions. He remarked that he felt the game had become faster in the seasons following the war, yet felt physically fit and had no imminent intentions to retire. When asked about his most memorable game up until that point, he discussed the 1945–46 FA Cup sixth-round tie against Aston Villa, recalling it as a "thriller", as they came from behind to win the game 4–3 within the final five minutes.

== International career ==
Leuty played for the England B national team on at least five occasions, and captained the team on two occasions, against Finland and the Netherlands respectively. He was tipped for promotion to the senior team as centre-half, having twice been first reserve. He was selected to play for England against Scotland as part of a benefit match for the Burnden Park disaster fund, held in August 1946. He was described by the Daily Mirror in 1950 as being "England's best uncapped centre half". Leuty was regarded by some as being the most likely challenger to Stoke City's Neil Franklin as a centre-half starter for England. The Football Post remarked in February 1951 that he was "bound to come in for consideration" for the next international game, given his good form at that time. A sports writer for the Derby Evening Telegraph commented in April 1951 that they would be "very much surprised" if Leuty were not to be chosen to represent England in at least one of their upcoming matches.

By late 1953, Leuty had not been able to gain his first full cap for the national first team. The Nottingham Evening Post suggested that he had become a "forgotten man" after dropping down from the First Division, comparing his situation with other players who failed to feature in subsequent international games after joining clubs outside of the top division. Reflecting on missing out on an international cap, Leuty says that the fine form displayed by Neil Franklin, a close friend, prevented him from an opportunity to feature. He also accepted that his chances were hindered by not playing for a first division team once Franklin left for South America in 1950.

== Death ==
Towards the end of 1955, Leuty was admitted to hospital in November. After being discharged, he spectated a game against Plymouth where he was described as being "far from well", and was re-admitted in December to have a blood transfusion. Despite again being discharged, he was re-admitted with kidney troubles, at the advice of the club doctor. He died on 19 December 1955 at Nottingham General Hospital, leaving a widow and two children. Leuty died intestate and his estate was believed to be worth just short of £2,000. Five of his colleagues and the Notts County manager carried his coffin. A post-mortem concluded that he died from lymph sarcoma, a form of cancer.

Following his death, funds were raised for the family through a charity match and a testimonial match, with amounts of £1,750 and £500 respectively provided to his widow.

== Career statistics ==
Appearances and goals by club, season and competition
| Club | Season | League | | | FA Cup | | Total | |
| Club | Season | Division | Apps | Goals | Apps | Goals | Apps | Goals |
|---|---|---|---|---|---|---|---|---|
| Derby County | 1945–46 | — | | | 10 | 0 | 10 | 0 |
| Derby County | 1946–47 | First Division | 34 | 0 | 4 | 0 | 38 | 0 |
| Derby County | 1947–48 | First Division | 41 | 0 | 6 | 0 | 47 | 0 |
| Derby County | 1948–49 | First Division | 40 | 1 | 4 | 0 | 44 | 1 |
| Derby County | 1949–50 | First Division | 16 | 0 | 3 | 0 | 19 | 0 |
| Derby County | Total | | 131 | 1 | 27 | 0 | 158 | 1 |
| Bradford (Park Avenue) | 1949–50 | Second Division | 10 | 0 | — | | 10 | 0 |
| Bradford (Park Avenue) | 1950–51 | Third Division North | 9 | 0 | — | | 9 | 0 |
| Bradford (Park Avenue) | Total | | 19 | 0 | — | | 19 | 0 |
| Notts County | 1950–51 | Second Division | 33 | 3 | 1 | 1 | 34 | 4 |
| Notts County | 1951–52 | Second Division | 38 | 0 | 2 | 0 | 40 | 0 |
| Notts County | 1952–53 | Second Division | 38 | 0 | 4 | 0 | 42 | 0 |
| Notts County | 1953–54 | Second Division | 39 | 0 | 1 | 0 | 40 | 0 |
| Notts County | 1954–55 | Second Division | 38 | 0 | 5 | 0 | 43 | 0 |
| Notts County | 1955–56 | Second Division | 2 | 0 | 0 | 0 | 2 | 0 |
| Notts County | Total | | 188 | 3 | 13 | 1 | 201 | 4 |
| Career total | | | 338 | 4 | 40 | 1 | 378 | 5 |

== Honours ==
Derby County

- FA Cup: 1945–46
