= Jimmy Methven =

Scottish footballer and manager

Personal information
- Full name: James Methven
- Date of birth: 7 December 1868
- Place of birth: Ceres, Scotland
- Date of death: 25 March 1953 (aged 84)
- Position: Full back

Senior career*
Years	Team	Apps	(Gls)
1891–1906	Derby County	458	(0)

Managerial career
- 1906–1922: Derby County
- * Club domestic league appearances and goals

James Methven (7 December 1868 – 25 March 1953), was a Scottish footballer. Methven became synonymous with Derby County; he played for the club in three FA Cup Finals and managed the club for 16 years. In total Methven was on the books at the Baseball Ground for 31 years and represented the club, in various capacities, in over 1,000 matches.

Methven, though born in Ceres, Fife, first played senior football in Edinburgh, for Leith Athletic, Heart of Midlothian and St Bernard's. He joined a growing band of Scottish professionals in English football when he signed forms with Derby County at the end of the 1890-91 season.

In total he played 511 games and (was one of three players who) appeared in each of the three unsuccessful FA Cup appearances for the Rams, before taking the reins as manager immediately following Harry Newbould's departure in 1906. He last played for the club (at the age of 38) on 2 February 1907, in an FA Cup second-round tie against Lincoln City, which Derby won 1-0.

Methven was unable to stop the slide into the Second Division during his first season with the club and only converted the club's wayward fortunes when he persuaded the 36-year-old Steve Bloomer to return home from Middlesbrough in 1910, helping Derby County back to the First Division as champions in 1912. Methven finally left Derby in June 1922 having been in charge for 498 games (winning more than he lost) finally working for a local authority after a stint as a scout with Stoke City.
