= 1952–53 Derby County F.C. season =

Derby County
1952–53 season
- Manager: Stuart McMillan
- Stadium: Baseball Ground
- First Division: 22nd (32 Points)
- FA Cup: Third Round
Home colours

During the 1952–53 season Derby County competed in the Football League First Division where they finished in 22nd position with 32 points and were relegated to the Second Division along with Stoke City whom Derby beat 2–1 in the penultimate match of the season sending Stoke down.

== Final league table ==
=== First Division ===
Pos	Club	P	W	D	L	F	A	GA	Pts
1	Arsenal	42	21	12	9	97	64	1.516	54
2	Preston North End	42	21	12	9	85	60	1.417	54
3	Wolverhampton Wanderers	42	19	13	10	86	63	1.365	51
4	West Bromwich Albion	42	21	8	13	66	60	1.100	50
5	Charlton Athletic	42	19	11	12	77	63	1.222	49
6	Burnley	42	18	12	12	67	52	1.288	48
7	Blackpool	42	19	9	14	71	70	1.014	47
8	Manchester United	42	18	10	14	69	72	0.958	46
9	Sunderland	42	15	13	14	68	82	0.829	43
10	Tottenham Hotspur	42	15	11	16	78	69	1.130	41
11	Aston Villa	42	14	13	15	63	61	1.033	41
12	Cardiff City	42	14	12	16	54	46	1.174	40
13	Middlesbrough	42	14	11	17	70	77	0.909	39
14	Bolton Wanderers	42	15	9	18	61	69	0.884	39
15	Portsmouth	42	14	10	18	74	83	0.892	38
16	Newcastle United	42	14	9	19	59	70	0.843	37
17	Liverpool	42	14	8	20	61	82	0.744	36
18	Sheffield Wednesday	42	12	11	19	62	72	0.861	35
19	Chelsea	42	12	11	19	56	66	0.848	35
20	Manchester City	42	14	7	21	72	87	0.828	35
21	Stoke City	42	12	10	20	53	66	0.803	34
22	Derby County	42	11	10	21	59	74	0.797	32

Key: P = Matches played; W = Matches won; D = Matches drawn; L = Matches lost; F = Goals for; A = Goals against; GA = Goal average; Pts = Points

== Results ==
=== Legend ===
Win	Draw	Loss

=== Football League First Division ===
23 August 1952 1	Bolton Wanderers	2–0	Derby County	Burnden Park

27 August 1952 2	Chelsea	1–1	Derby County	Stamford Bridge

30 August 1952 3	Derby County	0–1	Aston Villa	Baseball Ground

3 September 1952 4	Derby County	3–2	Chelsea	Baseball Ground

6 September 1952 5	Sunderland	2–1	Derby County	Roker Park

10 September 1952 6	Derby County	2–3	Manchester United	Baseball Ground

13 September 1952 7	Derby County	2–3	Wolverhampton Wanderers	Baseball Ground

20 September 1952 8	Charlton Athletic	3–1	Derby County	The Valley

27 September 1952 9	Derby County	2–0	Arsenal	Baseball Ground

4 October 1952 10	Burnley	1–2	Derby County	Turf Moor

11 October 1952 11	Derby County	0–0	Tottenham Hotspur	Baseball Ground

18 October 1952 12	Sheffield Wednesday	2–0	Derby County	Hillsborough Stadium

25 October 1952 13	Derby County	1–1	Cardiff City	Baseball Ground

1 November 1952 14	Newcastle United	0–1	Derby County	St James' Park

8 November 1952 15	Derby County	1–1	West Bromwich Albion	Baseball Ground

15 November 1952 16	Middlesbrough	1–0	Derby County	Ayresome Park

22 November 1952 17	Derby County	3–2	Liverpool	Baseball Ground

29 November 1952 18	Manchester City	1–0	Derby County	Maine Road

6 December 1952 19	Derby County	4–0	Stoke City	Baseball Ground
				Attendance: 17,484

13 December 1952 20	Preston North End	3–0	Derby County	Deepdale

20 December 1952 21	Derby County	4–3	Bolton Wanderers	Baseball Ground

26 December 1952 22	Derby County	3–0	Portsmouth	Baseball Ground

27 December 1952 23	Portsmouth	2–2	Derby County	Fratton Park

1 January 1953 24	Manchester United	1–0	Derby County	Old Trafford

3 January 1953 25	Aston Villa	3–0	Derby County	Villa Park

17 January 1953 26	Derby County	3–1	Sunderland	Baseball Ground

24 January 1953 27	Wolverhampton Wanderers	3–1	Derby County	Molineux Stadium

7 February 1953 28	Derby County	1–1	Charlton Athletic	Baseball Ground

18 February 1953 29	Arsenal	6–2	Derby County	Arsenal Stadium

21 February 1953 30	Derby County	1–3	Burnley	Baseball Ground

7 March 1953 31	Derby County	2–1	Sheffield Wednesday	Baseball Ground

12 March 1953 32	Tottenham Hotspur	5–2	Derby County	White Hart Lane

14 March 1953 33	Cardiff City	2–0	Derby County	Ninian Park

21 March 1953 34	Derby County	0–2	Newcastle United	Baseball Ground

28 March 1953 35	West Bromwich Albion	2–2	Derby County	The Hawthorns

3 April 1953 36	Blackpool	2–1	Derby County	Bloomfield Road

4 April 1953 37	Derby County	3–3	Middlesbrough	Baseball Ground

6 April 1953 38	Derby County	1–1	Blackpool	Baseball Ground

11 April 1953 39	Liverpool	1–1	Derby County	Anfield

18 April 1953 40	Derby County	5–0	Manchester City	Baseball Ground

25 April 1953 41	Stoke City	1–2	Derby County	Victoria Ground

29 April 1953 42	Derby County	0–1	Preston North End	Baseball Ground

=== FA Cup ===
10 January 1953 Round 3	Derby County	4–4	Chelsea	Baseball Ground
	McLachlan 35'; Parry 45'; Lee 67'; McLaren 69'	Report	Bentley 58'; Oliver 70' (o.g.); Armstrong 76'; McNichol 78'	Attendance: 24,867

14 January 1953 Replay	Chelsea	1–0 (a.e.t.)	Derby County	Stamford Bridge
	Parsons 100'	Report		Attendance: 38,115
