= Peter Ramage (footballer, born 1908) =

Scottish footballer

Personal information
- Full name: Peter Martin Fairgrieve Ramage
- Date of birth: 26 March 1908
- Place of birth: Bonnyrigg, Scotland
- Date of death: 17 December 1982 (aged 74)
- Place of death: Ballyclare, Northern Ireland
- Position: Inside left

Senior career*
Years	Team	Apps	(Gls)
- Bonnyrigg Rose Athletic
- Tranent Juniors
- Newtongrange Star
1927–1928	Coventry City	26	(5)
1928–1937	Derby County	233	(55)
1937–1939	Chesterfield	71	(4)
- Chelmsford City
- → Notts County (guest)
- → Derby County (guest)
- Heanor Town
- Atherstone Town
1947–1948	Ilkeston Town	27	(10)
- Qualcast Sports
- Brush Sports
- * Club domestic league appearances and goals

Peter Martin Fairgrieve Ramage (26 March 1908 – 17 December 1982) was a Scottish footballer who played as an inside left.

== Career ==
Ramage began his career playing for hometown club Bonnyrigg Rose Athletic. Moves to Tranent Juniors and Newtongrange Star followed, before moving to England in 1927 to sign for Coventry City. In 1928, after scoring five times in 26 league games for Coventry, Ramage joined Derby County. At Derby, he played 233 Football League games for the club, scoring 55 times over the course of nine years. In 1937, Ramage signed for Chesterfield, playing 71 times over the course of two seasons. In 1939, Ramage signed for Chelmsford City. Due to the outbreak of World War II, he guested for Notts County and Derby County during his time at Chelmsford. Following the culmination of the war, Ramage played for non-league clubs Heanor Town, Atherstone Town, Ilkeston Town, Qualcast Sports and Brush Sports.
