= Les Moore =

English footballer

Personal information
- Full name: John Leslie Moore
- Date of birth: 7 July 1933
- Place of birth: Sheffield, Yorkshire, England
- Date of death: October 1992 (aged 59)
- Position: Centre half

Senior career*
Years	Team	Apps	(Gls)
–	Worksop Town		
1957–1964	Derby County	144	(3)
1964–1965	Boston United		
1965–1967	Lincoln City	59	(0)
–	Buxton		

Managerial career
- –1970: Buxton
- * Club domestic league appearances and goals

John Leslie "Les" Moore (7 July 1933 – 1992) was an English footballer who made 203 appearances in the Football League playing for Derby County and Lincoln City. He played as a centre half. He played for Worksop Town in the Midland League before joining Derby County for a £1,000 fee, and also played non-league football for Boston United and Buxton, who he also managed until 1970. He remained a semi-professional footballer throughout his career, while working as an insurance salesman.
