= Jack Atkin =

English footballer

Personal information
- Full name: John Thomas Atkin
- Date of birth: 1883
- Place of birth: Newhall, England
- Date of death: 15 December 1961 (aged 77–78)
- Position: Full back

Senior career*
Years	Team	Apps	(Gls)
–1907	Newhall Swifts		
1907–1922	Derby County	308	(3)
- * Club domestic league appearances and goals

John Thomas Atkin (1883 – 15 December 1961) was an English professional footballer who made over 300 appearances as a full back in the Football League for Derby County.

== Personal life ==
Atkin served as a gunner in the Royal Garrison Artillery during the First World War.

== Honours ==
Derby County

- Football League Second Division (2): 1911–12, 1914–15

== Career statistics ==
Appearances and goals by club, season and competition
Club	Season	League			FA Cup		Total	
Club	Season	Division	Apps	Goals	Apps	Goals	Apps	Goals
Derby County	1907–08	Second Division	14	0	0	0	14	0
Derby County	1908–09	Second Division	14	0	0	0	14	0
Derby County	1909–10	Second Division	35	0	1	0	36	0
Derby County	1910–11	Second Division	35	0	4	0	39	0
Derby County	1911–12	Second Division	34	0	2	0	36	0
Derby County	1912–13	First Division	38	0	1	0	39	0
Derby County	1913–14	First Division	33	0	2	0	35	0
Derby County	1914–15	Second Division	30	0	1	0	31	0
Derby County	1919–20	First Division	42	1	2	0	44	1
Derby County	1920–21	First Division	32	2	3	0	35	2
Derby County	1921–22	First Division	0	0	1	0	1	0
Career total			308	3	17	0	325	3
