= Jack Nicholas (footballer, born 1885) =

English footballer

Personal information
- Full name: William Joseph Nicholas
- Date of birth: 1885
- Place of birth: Staines, England
- Date of death: 14 July 1934 (aged 48–49)
- Position: Full back

Senior career*
Years	Team	Apps	(Gls)
1904–1905	Staines Town		
1905–1912	Derby County	130	(0)
1912–1920	Swansea Town		
Total		130	(0)
- * Club domestic league appearances and goals

William Joseph Nicholas (1885–1934) was an English footballer who played in the Football League for Derby County.

After leaving Derby, he joined Swansea Town where he was later made club captain. During his time at Swansea, he suffered with a recurring knee injury, which he reportedly had a successful operation on in June 1914. Nicholas was released by the club in the summer of 1920.

He was the father of Derby County player Jack Nicholas and later became head of ground staff at the club. He died in July 1934, aged 49.
