= Reg Harrison =

English footballer (1923–2020)

Personal information
- Full name: Reginald Frederick Harrison
- Date of birth: 22 May 1923
- Place of birth: Normanton, Derby, England
- Date of death: 17 September 2020 (aged 97)
- Place of death: Alvaston, England
- Position: Right winger

Youth career
- Derby Corinthians
- 1939–1944: Derby County

Senior career*
Years	Team	Apps	(Gls)
1944–1955	Derby County	254	(52)
- → Sheffield United (war guest)
- → Notts County (war guest)
- → Charlton Athletic (war guest)
- → Hartlepools United (war guest)
1955–1957	Boston United		
1957–1962	Long Eaton United		

Managerial career
- 1958–1962: Long Eaton United
- Wilmorton & Alvaston
- Alfreton Town
- * Club domestic league appearances and goals

Reginald Frederick Harrison (22 May 1923 – 17 September 2020) was an English professional footballer who played as a right winger.

== Early life ==
Born in May 1923 in Normanton, Derby, Harrison left school at 14 to train to be a decorator. During World War Two he served with the Royal Engineers, serving as an Army training officer based in England.

== Career ==
After playing non-league football for Derby Corinthians, Harrison signed for Derby County at the age of 16. He signed amateur forms in 1941 and turned professional in 1944, whilst he was also serving in the Army. During the war he guested for Sheffield United, Notts County, Charlton Athletic and Hartlepools United. He scored 52 goals in 254 league appearances for Derby, and 59 goals in 281 games in all competitions. Whilst with Derby, Harrison won the FA Cup in 1946. As of September 2018 he was also the oldest living FA Cup winner.

He left Derby to play for Boston United. He joined Long Eaton United as a player in 1957, becoming player-manager in February 1958, remaining in that position until May 1962. He later also managed Wilmorton & Alvaston and Alfreton Town.

After retiring as a player, Harrison worked for Derby City Council's Youth Service, and set up a youth centre and football club.

== Personal life ==
Harrison and his wife celebrated their 70th wedding anniversary in March 2015. The couple had two children (including a son who died from leukemia at the age of 7), two granddaughters, and, as of March 2015, one great-grandson. In September 2018 it was proposed by the local council that he would be awarded the Freedom of the City of Derby.

He died at home in Alvaston on 17 September 2020 at the age of 97. At the time of his death he was the oldest living FA Cup finalist.

== Honours ==
Derby County

- FA Cup: 1945–46
