= Harry Leonard (footballer, born 1886) =

English footballer

Personal information
- Full name: Henry Droxford Leonard
- Date of birth: July 1886
- Place of birth: Sunderland, England
- Date of death: 3 November 1951 (aged 65)
- Place of death: Derby, England
- Position: Centre forward

Youth career
- Sunderland West End
- Southwick

Senior career*
Years	Team	Apps	(Gls)
1907–1908	Newcastle United	0	(0)
1908–1911	Grimsby Town	53	(23)
1911	Middlesbrough	13	(3)
1911–1920	Derby County	144	(72)
1920–1921	Manchester United	10	(5)
1921–?	Heanor Town	?	(?)
Total		220	(103)
- * Club domestic league appearances and goals

Henry Droxford Leonard (July 1886 – 3 November 1951) was an English footballer. His regular position was as a forward. He was born in Sunderland. He played for Sunderland West End, Grimsby Town, Middlesbrough, Derby County, Leicester Fosse, Manchester United and Heanor Town.

== Personal life ==
Leonard served in the Royal Engineers during the First World War.
