= Ray Straw =

English footballer

Personal information
- Full name: Raymond Straw
- Date of birth: 22 May 1933
- Place of birth: Ilkeston, England
- Date of death: 13 May 2001 (aged 67)
- Position: Forward

Senior career*
Years	Team	Apps	(Gls)
1951–1957	Derby County	94	(57)
1957–1961	Coventry City	143	(79)
1961–1963	Mansfield Town	44	(12)
Total		281	(148)
- * Club domestic league appearances and goals

Raymond Straw (22 May 1933 – 13 May 2001) was an English professional footballer. During a professional career that lasted twelve years, he scored over 140 goals in the Football League in spells with Derby County, Coventry City and Mansfield Town. His 37 league goals for Derby during the 1956–57 season remains a joint club record.

== Career ==
=== Derby County ===
Straw was born in the village of Kirk Hallam in Ilkeston. After leaving school, he worked as a coal miner, He played football for non-league side Ilkeston Town, having previously represented his county school level. In August 1951, he joined First Division side Derby County and made his professional debut in the last match of the 1951–52 season against Chelsea at the age of 18. However, he was called up for his national service soon after and did not become a regular in the Derby first team until they had been relegated again.

His breakthrough season came in 1955–56 when he scored fourteen goals for Derby as they finished second in the Third Division North behind Grimsby Town. The following year, Straw's brother offered him a bonus of half a crown for every goal he scored and ten shillings for every hat-trick. During the season, Straw went on to score 37 goals in league games, equalling the club record set by Jack Bowers during the 1930–31 season, as Derby finished as winners of the Third Division North.

=== Coventry City ===
In November 1957, Straw joined Coventry City after impressing manager Billy Frith, making his debut in a match against Millwall on 23 November 1957. After arriving at the club, he was given the nickname "toffee" due to his penchant for chewing sweets. Straw finished as Coventry's top goalscorer in all four seasons he spent at the club, helping them achieve promotion to the Third Division during the 1958–59 season after scoring 27 goals. His total included a streak of scoring in eight consecutive league and cup matches, the longest streak of any Coventry player after World War II.

By appearing in the Third Division the following season, Straw became the first player to have played in all six divisions of the Football League, from the First Division to the Fourth Division and the North and South sections of the Third Division. He left Coventry in 1961 to join Mansfield Town where he finished his professional career. He later played for non-league side Lockheed Leamington.

== Honours ==
Derby County

- Football League Third Division North winner: 1956–57
