= Jimmy Moore (footballer, born 1889) =

English footballer

James Moore
Personal information
- Date of birth: 25 January 1889
- Place of birth: Handsworth, England
- Date of death: 15 April 1980 (aged 91)
- Height: 5 ft 6 1/2 in (1.69 m)
- Position: Inside forward

Youth career
- Quebec Albion (Handsworth)
- Cradley Heath

Senior career*
Years	Team	Apps	(Gls)
1911–1913	Glossop	67	(35)
1913–1926	Derby County	203	(75)
1926–1927	Chesterfield	41	(21)
1927–19??	Mansfield Town		
- Worcester City

International career
1923	England	1	(1)
- * Club domestic league appearances and goals

James Moore (25 January 1889 – 15 April 1980) was an English footballer who played at inside-left for Derby County and made one appearance for England in 1923.

== Football career ==
Moore was born in Handsworth in Birmingham and after playing for local sides Quebec Albion and Cradley Heath joined Glossop in the summer of 1911.

He remained with Glossop, then playing in the Football League Second Division for two seasons before moving to Derby County of the First Division for a fee of £1,500 in October 1913. Although Derby were relegated at the end of Moores's first season with the club, they bounced back and returned as champions in 1915. By this time, however, the First World War had broken out and football was suspended until 1919.

On Christmas Day 1922 (now back in the Second Division), Moore scored five goals for Derby County in a 6–0 victory over Crystal Palace.

In May 1923, Moore was called up to the England team for a tour of Sweden and was one of six débutantes selected for the match against Sweden on 21 May. Although Moore scored in a 4–2 victory, he lost his place for the next game to his namesake, Billy Moore of West Ham United; neither Moore was selected for England again. At the time of his solitary England appearance, Moore was aged 34 years and 11 days.

Moore remained at Derby County until March 1926, helping the club to regain their First Division status, before joining Chesterfield where he spent a season. He then made a few appearances in non-League football for Mansfield Town before winding up his career at Worcester City.

== Honours ==
Derby County

- Football League Second Division champions: 1914–15
- Football League Second Division runners-up: 1925–26
