= Johnny McIntyre (footballer, born 1898) =

Scottish footballer

Personal information
- Full name: John McMutrie McIntyre
- Date of birth: 19 October 1898
- Place of birth: Glasgow, Scotland
- Date of death: 1974 (aged 75–76)
- Height: 5 ft 8 in (1.73 m)
- Position: Right half

Senior career*
Years	Team	Apps	(Gls)
- Glasgow Perthshire
- Stenhousemuir
1921–1931	Derby County	349	(9)
1931–1933	Chesterfield	58	(0)
Total		407	(9)
- * Club domestic league appearances and goals

John McMutrie McIntyre (19 October 1898 – 1974) was a Scottish professional footballer who played in the English Football League in England for Derby County and Chesterfield.
