= Bill Curry (English footballer) =

English footballer

Personal information
- Full name: William Morton Curry
- Date of birth: 12 October 1935
- Place of birth: Longbenton, England
- Date of death: 20 August 1990 (aged 54)
- Place of death: Mansfield, England
- Height: 5 ft 10 in (1.78 m)
- Position: Centre forward

Youth career
- –: Newcastle United

Senior career*
Years	Team	Apps	(Gls)
1953–1959	Newcastle United	80	(36)
1959–1960	Brighton & Hove Albion	49	(26)
1960–1965	Derby County	148	(67)
1965–1968	Mansfield Town	102	(53)
1968–1969	Chesterfield	14	(2)
1969	→ Boston Town (loan)		

International career
1957	England U23	1	(1)

Managerial career
- 1971–1976: Boston Town
- 1977–1986: Sutton Town
- * Club domestic league appearances and goals

William Morton Curry (12 October 1935 – 20 August 1990) was an English professional footballer who scored 184 goals from 393 appearances in the Football League playing as a centre forward for Newcastle United, Brighton & Hove Albion, Derby County, Mansfield Town and Chesterfield. He played once, and scored, for England's under-23 team.

He was Brighton's top scorer in the 1959–60 season with 26 goals in all competitions, and Mansfield's top scorer in both 1965–66 and 1966–67. He went on to manage Boston Town to the Midland League title in the 1974–75 season, and spent nine years as manager of Sutton Town.

Curry was born in Longbenton, Northumberland, in 1935, and died in Mansfield, Nottinghamshire, in 1990 at the age of 54.
