= Alf Bentley (footballer, born 1887) =

English footballer

Personal information
- Date of birth: 15 September 1887
- Place of birth: Alfreton, England
- Date of death: 15 April 1940 (aged 52)
- Place of death: Alfreton, England
- Position: Centre-forward

Youth career
- 1905–1906: Alfreton

Senior career*
| Years | Team | Apps | (Gls) |
| 1906–1911 | Derby County | 151 | (98) |
| 1911–1913 | Bolton Wanderers | 51 | (15) |
| 1913–1922 | West Bromwich Albion | 97 | (46) |
| 1922–1924 | Burton Albion | | |
| 1924–1926 | Alfreton Town | | |
- * Club domestic league appearances and goals

Alfred Bentley (15 September 1887 – 15 April 1940) was an English footballer who played as a centre-forward.

== Biography ==
Bentley was born in Alfreton, Derbyshire. He turned professional with Derby County in December 1906, joining for a £50 fee. During the 1908–09 season he was the top scorer of the Second Division with 24 goals, with a further 8 goals in FA Cup matches.

In May 1911 he signed for Bolton Wanderers for £1000, before moving to West Bromwich Albion for £500 in June 1913. He scored all four goals on his league debut in a 4-1 win against Burnley in the first fixture of the season in September. 111 years passed before Josh Maja scored Albion's next opening day hattrick in August 2024 against Queen's Park Rangers.

Bentley joined Burton Albion in May 1922 and then his hometown club Alfreton Town in August 1924, before retiring from football in May 1926. He later worked in the steel industry and died in Alfreton in 1940.
