= Eddie Thomas (footballer, born 1933) =

English footballer

Personal information
- Full name: Edward Thomas
- Date of birth: 23 October 1933
- Place of birth: Newton-le-Willows, England
- Date of death: 12 November 2003 (aged 70)
- Place of death: Derby, England
- Position: Forward

Senior career*
Years	Team	Apps	(Gls)
1956–1960	Everton	86	(39)
1960–1962	Blackburn Rovers	37	(9)
1962–1964	Swansea Town	68	(21)
1964–1967	Derby County	105	(43)
1967–1968	Leyton Orient	11	(2)
Total		307	(114)
- * Club domestic league appearances and goals

Edward Thomas (23 October 1933 – 12 November 2003) was an English footballer who played in the Football League for Blackburn Rovers, Derby County, Everton, Leyton Orient and Swansea Town.

Thomas was signed for Derby by manager Tim Ward, and equalled a club record by scoring in each of his first six games for Derby in 1964.
