= Hugh McLaren (footballer, born 1926) =

Scottish footballer

Personal information
- Date of birth: 24 June 1926
- Place of birth: Hamilton, Scotland
- Date of death: 8 December 1965 (aged 39)
- Place of death: Derby, England
- Position: Left winger

Senior career*
Years	Team	Apps	(Gls)
- Blantyre Celtic
1947–1949	Kilmarnock	49	(26)
1949–1954	Derby County	119	(53)
1954–1955	Nottingham Forest	33	(15)
1955–1956	Walsall	31	(8)
1956–1957	Burton Albion		
1957–1959	Gresley Rovers	54	(27)
Total		286	(129)
- * Club domestic league appearances and goals

Hugh McLaren (24 June 1926 – 8 December 1965) was a Scottish professional footballer who played as a left winger.

== Career ==
Born in Hamilton, McLaren played for Blantyre Celtic, Kilmarnock, Derby County, Nottingham Forest, Walsall, Burton Albion and Gresley Rovers.

He died on 8 December 1965, from cancer.
