= Jack Parry (English footballer) =

English footballer (1931–2022)

Personal information
- Date of birth: 29 July 1931
- Place of birth: Derby, England
- Date of death: 19 July 2022 (aged 90)
- Place of death: Derby, England
- Positions: Inside forward; wing-half

Senior career*
Years	Team	Apps	(Gls)
1949–1966	Derby County	483	(105)
1967–1968	Boston United	29	(5)
Total		512	(110)
- * Club domestic league appearances and goals

Jack Parry (29 July 1931 – 19 July 2022) was an English footballer who spent 20 seasons of his career with Derby County. Parry played for Derby Boys and signed for the Rams in July 1948, a time when Raich Carter and Billy Steel were at the club. A one-club man, Parry remained at The Baseball Ground for 20 years and set a club record 482 League appearances up to the 1965–66 season (517 in total) until Kevin Hector overtook it. Parry is also the Rams' ninth highest goalscorer in all competitions with 110 goals, and fifth highest League goalscorer (105 goals).

An inside forward, Parry made his debut aged 17, and scored, in a 2–2 draw at home to Aston Villa in April 1949. He played sporadically until the last four games of the 1950–51 season and was leading scorer in 1951–52 with 11 goals in 28 League games. Parry's best scoring season was 24 goals in 34 League games in 1955–56 but was injured by Ray De Gruchy's challenge playing Grimsby Town at The Baseball Ground in March 1956. The back injury sustained in the game meant Parry was sidelined for the rest of the season and without his goals, Grimsby went on to win the Third Division North and take the only promotion place. The injury limited Parry's contribution the following season and he made 18 appearances, scoring seven goals, as Derby won the title. In the Second Division Parry became club captain and converted to wing-half but eventually lost his place in the 1965–66 season before moving on to Boston United.

Parry was a popular member of the dressing room. One well-known tale is when trainer Ralph Hann was treating him in a match for suspected concussion. Hann asked Parry where he was. "I'm at Wembley" said Parry. "We're beating Brazil 2–0 – and I've scored both."

His four brothers were also footballers: Cyril played for Notts County, Ray for Bolton Wanderers and England, and Reg and Glynn, who both played in non-league.

On 19 July 2022, Derby County announced that Parry had died.
