= History of Derby County F.C. (1884–1967) =

The history of Derby County Football Club from 1884 to 1967 covers the major events in the history of the club from its formation in 1884 until the end of the 1966–1967 season.

This era saw Derby County F.C. become one of the original twelve founder member of the Football League, finish League Runners-Up on three occasions, reach four FA Cup Finals, winning one, and record the club record for the longest continued presence in the top tier of the English football league system, spending 27 years (and 20 seasons) there between 1926 and 1953. A sharp decline towards the end of the era saw Derby lose their status as full league members for the only time in their history with relegation to the Third Division North in 1955 before they returned at settled in the Second Tier for much of the next 15 years.

In terms of players, it saw the club represented by arguably its greatest ever player, Steve Bloomer, who scored a club record 332 goals in 525 appearances, as well as other Football League greats such as John Goodall, Hughie Gallacher, Raich Carter and Peter Doherty.

== Formation and founder member of the Football League (1884–1892) ==
Derby County Football Club was formed in 1884, as an offshoot of Derbyshire County Cricket Club. Derbyshire, which had formed in 1871, had just embarked on a disastrous cricket season, losing all ten of its Championship matches, and was looking for methods of generating extra revenue. With the increasing popularity of football in the areas becoming apparent (Derby Midland had formed the previous year, and 1884 Derbyshire Cup Final had attracted 7,000 spectators, the biggest crowd in the area to ever watch football), William Morley, a bank clerk at the Midland Railway, and several other enthusiasts, saw the establishment of an associated football team as an opportunity to both generate extra revenue and give supporters a winter interest. They approached the Derbyshire FA, formed the previous year, proposing the name "Derbyshire County", to emphasise the connection to the cricket club. This was rejected as being too long, and the name "Derby County" was instead settled upon, with home games to be played at the County Ground.

1884–94 kit

Adopting a kit of amber, chocolate and blue, the club began to aggressively gather players, including Derby Midland's star winger George Bakewell and Darley Abbey's Ernest Hickinbottom, and embarked on an extensive programme of friendlies, beginning with a 6–0 away defeat by Great Lever on 13 September 1884. The club's official competitive debut in the First Round of the 1885 FA Cup, with a 7–0 defeat at home to Walsall Town on 8 November 1884. The club fared better in the following season's competition, where they recorded victories over Birmingham St. George's and Aston Villa, before losing to Small Heath Alliance in the Third Round. The victory over Aston Villa, who were established was one of the major forces in the English game at the time, was arguably one of the most important in the club's history as it attracted better opposition in friendlies and made Derby a prominent enough club to be one of the 12 founder members of The Football League when it was formed in 1888.

The opening day of the first ever Football League season was on 8 September 1888, and saw Derby come from 3–0 down away to Bolton Wanderers to win 6–3, though the club ultimately finished 10th out of 12 teams. Between September 1888 and 8 December 1888, the club embarked on a run of eight consecutive defeats which, despite being equaled twice, in 1865 in 1987–88, stands as a club record today.

Despite this poor start, the club acquired its first superstar in May 1889, with the shock capture of forward John Goodall. Goodall had just finished the season as the league's top scorer and had been part of Preston North End's famous "The Invincibles", who had just won the League and FA Cup Double and gone the whole league season unbeaten. Despite Goodall's presence the club could only manage a 7th-place finish in the 1890–91 Football League and recorded the club record defeat when they lost 11–2 away to Everton in the FA Cup first round.

The 1890–91 season opened with an extraordinary 8–5 victory over Blackburn Rovers at the Racecourse Ground, which was Indicative of the quixotic nature of the season ahead. Derby conceded 81 goals in just 22 matches, conceding 4 or more in over half the season fixtures. They also recorded the club record league victory of 9–0, which came against Wolverhampton Wanderers just a week after losing 8–0 away to Sunderland. The goalkeeper for much of the campaign was future Scotland international David Haddow, who joined from Albion Rovers in the summer. Haddow played just 16 matches for Derby, shipping 69 goals, before being sent back to Albion. His successor was Charles Bunyan, who had kept goal for Hyde United when they lost 26–0 to Preston North End in 1887. The club eventually recorded a finish of 11 out of 12 teams, largely thanks to the goals of John Goodall, who hit 13 in just 20 appearances.

In the 1891 close season, Derby absorbed Derby Midland, who had just beaten them 1–0 in the Derbyshire Senior Cup Final, leaving The Rams as Derby's sole professional football club. They still struggled in the league, however, finishing a mediocre 10th out 14 teams in the 1891–92 season, though the campaign was notable for the playing of one match, a 1–0 victory over Sunderland, at The Baseball Ground, later to be the club's home, due to a date clash with the County Ground's lessee, the Derby Recreation Company. The season also saw John Goodall become the first player to be picked for England whilst at the club when he played against Wales in March 1891.

In 1892 the Football League invited the Football Alliance to merge with them and a new look Football League Division One, consisting of the previous season's Football League clubs (minus the relegated Darwen) and the three strongest Alliance clubs (Nottingham Forest, Newton Heath and Sheffield Wednesday), was formed. One offshoot of this was the holding of the first ever competitive East Midlands derby, which saw Forest run out 3–2 winners at the County Ground.

== The Bloomer years (1892–1906) ==
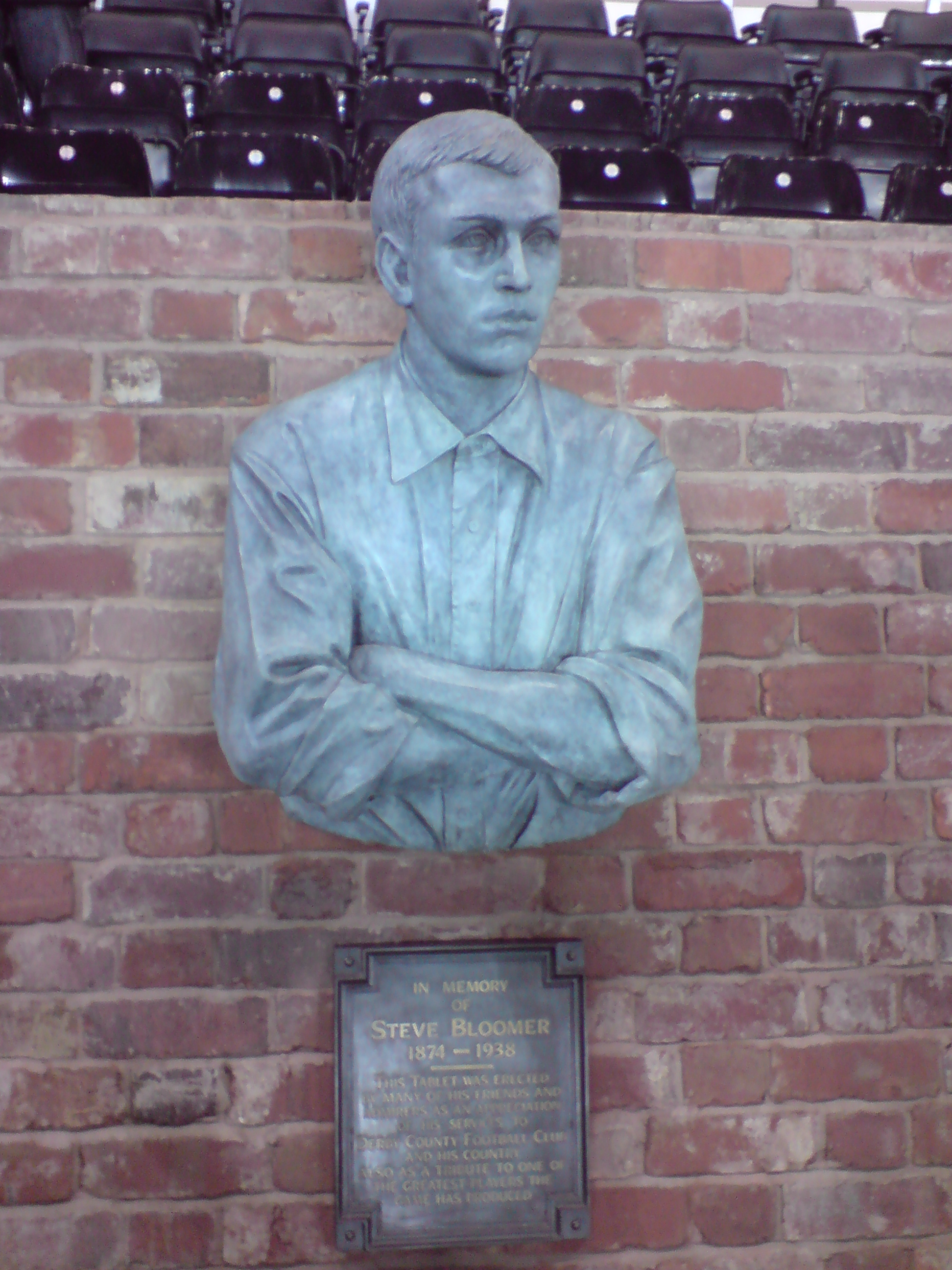
Steve Bloomer

The opening day of the 1892–93 season saw the league debut of 18-year-old Steve Bloomer in a 3–1 win away to Stoke City. Bloomer, widely regarded as the finest goalscorer of his generation and Derby County's finest ever player, was mentored by John Goodall, crediting John Goodall with his early development, and over the next 13 consecutive seasons Bloomer was the club's leading League goalscorer, as well as the overall top league scorer on five occasions in 1896, 1897, 1899, 1901 and 1904. Despite Bloomer's presence, the Derby could only finish the season in 13th out of 16 teams, though several notable records occurred during the campaign Archie Goodall's appearance in the 3–2 defeat at home to Nottingham Forest on 1 October was the first of his club record 167 consecutive appearances for the club, which took Goodall all the way up until 2 October 1897. Additionally, the 4–5 home defeat of 19 October to Notts County saw Walter Roulstone become the first player to register 100 League and Cup games for the club. There was also controversy in the FA Cup, when the 1st round tie against Sheffield Wednesday was declared void not once, (a 2–3 defeat) but twice (a 1–0 win) when the losing club on each occasion successfully questioned the eligibility of an opposition player. The tie was finally settled, at the third attempt, when Sheffield Wednesday ran out 4–2 victors.

The combination of Goodall and Bloomer began to bring Derby County to the fore as they embarked on their first spell of success, though they never achieved any silverware. The spell included finishing runners-up to Aston Villa in the (1895–96 First Division) and two third-place finishes (1893–94 and 1896–97). They also became a strong presence in the FA Cup, reaching the FA Cup Semi-finals twice in consecutive seasons in 1896 and 1897 and then the Final itself in both 1898 and 1899, though they lost out to Nottingham Forest and Sheffield United, 3–1 and 4–1 respectively. The period also saw three other significant occurrences in the club's history – in 1894 the club adopted its, now familiar, black and white kit colours, in 1895 moved to The Baseball Ground permanently and, in 1896, after becoming a limited company, appointed W.D. Clark as the club's first-ever manager. However, as the Rams approached the 1900s, John Goodall, so influential in the success of the last five seasons, was in his mid 30s and no longer a regular fixture in the Derby County line-up. His move to New Brighton Tower in 1900 coincided with a decline in the club's fortunes.

Derby started the new century with a sixth-place finish and appointed its first full-time manager in Harry Newbould, the first time a single man was in sole control of first team affairs. Newbould had previously served as secretary, and combined the role with his new post. He took Derby to the FA Cup semi-final in 1902, and went one better the following season, taking Derby County to its third final in six seasons in 1903, but had the ignomy of setting the record, which still stands, of the biggest defeat in FA Cup final history as Derby lost 6–0 to Bury. Despite cup success, and the bringing in of international players, such as Charlie Morris and Ben Warren, to the Baseball Ground, alongside the continuing form of Steve Bloomer, who scored his 200th Derby County goal in just 279 appearances in a 3–1 win over Everton in November 1902, Derby—under the cloud of increasing financial worries—began to suffer from a drop in league form and played out several finishes in the lower half of the table in 1903–04, 1904–05 and 1905–06.

== Bloomer departs and first relegation (1906–1911) ==
The close of the 1906 season saw Bloomer, against his wishes, sold to Middlesbrough, forcing Harry Newbould – who saw the enforced selling of Bloomer as a sign of things to come – defect to become manager/secretary at Manchester City in July 1906. Former Derby player Jimmy Methven, who was nearing the end of a career spent at right-back with The Rams, was appointed as Newbould's successor, but faced without a regular goal-scorer, found himself in the position of overseeing Derby's first ever relegation, as they finished 19th out of 20 in the 1906–07 First Division table.

Methven had to rebuild the team ahead of the 1907–08 Second Division season, and attempted to replace Bloomer with Alf Bentley, whom he signed for £50 from Alfreton Town. Despite Bentley proving a worthy successor to Bloomer, breaking Bloomer's records of Most Goals in a League Season as he struck 27 goals in 35 matches, Derby struggled to challenge for promotion, finishing just 6th in the table, eight points off of Champions Bradford City. The following campaign saw Derby reach another FA Cup Semi-final, where they lost out 2–1 to Bristol City in a replay, but could only finish 5th in the league, despite another exceptional season from Bentley, who broke another Bloomer record, this time of most League and Cup Goals in a Single Season, as he hit 32 goals in all competitions, including a hat-trick in a 3–0 victory over Nottingham Forest in the FA Cup Fourth round. Derby again improved by one place in the 1909/10 season, finishing fourth, just one point behind Champions Manchester City, and behind Oldham Athletic and Hull City on goal-difference. The nickname of 'The Busy B's' was given to the attacking trio of Bentley, Horace Barnes and Jimmy Bauchop, who, between them, accounted for 59 of Derby's 72 league goals that season, with Bentley becoming the first ever Derby player to hit thirty goals in a single campaign.

After scoring 62 goals in 130 games for Middlesbrough, Steve Bloomer, at the age of 35, returned to Derby County in time for the 1910/11 season and promptly retook his position as Derby's top scorer, hitting 20 as the now '5 Busy Bee's' (Bloomer, Bentley, Barnes, Bauchop and Frank Buckley) hit 63 of the Rams 73 goals, though they could only finish 6th.

== "Yo-yoing" between divisions and the Great War (1911–1924) ==
Despite selling Alf Bentley to Bolton Wanderers, the 1911/12 Second Division season saw Derby finally regain their place in the top flight after five years outside it, as they finished top of the league on goal difference over Chelsea, securing their first ever top spot finish. The season also saw Bloomer grab his 300th goal for Derby in 4–2 home win over Huddersfield Town. Derby's stay in the top flight was brief, however, and despite a 7th-place finish in their first season back in the First Division (a season which saw goalkeeper Earnest Scattergood become the only Goalkeeper to score for the club with a penalty in a 1–1 draw away to Manchester City on the final day of the season), the fading presence of the talismanic Steve Bloomer was reflected in the team. Bloomer, now aged 40, appeared only 5 times in the 1913/14 First Division season, scoring twice, both of which came in a 3–5 home defeat by Sheffield United on 6 September, taking his tally for the club to 332, and the club finished bottom of the league.

"Men argued with each other in pubs up and down England, not about the menace of the Kaiser's steel-helmeted hordes but about the price paid to Derby County for Horace Barnes"

— Leslie Knighton, Arsenal Manager, on Horace Barnes' move to Manchester City

After the breakout of World War I, the football authorities decided to carry on with the league programme despite criticisms it was unpatriotic. This was just as well for Derby, who won the 1914–15 Second Division by three points over Preston, who had been relegated with them the previous season. This was despite losing Horace Barnes to Manchester City for £2,500, equalling the British Record Transfer Fee paid by Blackburn Rovers for Percy Dawson, and setting the record for a transaction between English clubs. The fee sparked outrage across the country amid a moral debate over the value of a single human being when lives were being lost to war so cheaply.

The cancellation of the league programme meant that the Rams had to wait 5 years to play First Division football again as the outbreak of World War I led to the suspension of the Football League until 1919, when it reconvened. During this five-year break, Derby played one season in the wartime Midlands Section during 1915–16, before closing down for the duration of the war, the majority of the club's players turning out for Notts County. The end of the War in November 1918 came too late to start a proper league competition, though football, and Derby, resumed when Derby played in the small Midland Victory League in preparation for the return of football proper in August 1919.

The return to League action, and First Division football, saw Jimmy Methven charged with re-invigorating an increasingly ageing squad – whilst the squad did include players like Jimmy Bagshaw and Jimmy Moore, good enough to be capped for England even in their 30s, and two future internationals in Alf Quantrill and George Thornewell, the majority of the Derby squad was not up to the standard required. Methven also had to contend with his deteriorating eyesight. Derby struggled throughout the season and managed to stay up by just two points, finishing 18th; largely thanks to a run which saw them collect 4 wins and a draw from their last 5 games.

The efforts of the 1919/20 season provided just a brief reprieve for Derby, and they finished the 1920–21 season in 20th place, four points away from safety. Still struggling to replace Bloomer, the club set a club record of just 32 goals (which was to stand for over 80 years) and won just 5 out of their 42 matches. Methven fulfilled one final season as Derby County manager in their first season back in the second tier, guiding them to a lowly 12th place in the 1921–22 Second Division, the lowest position in the club's history, and, suffering from glaucoma and after undergoing an unsuccessful eye operation, left the club at the age of 53, ending a 31-year association with Derby County. Despite rumours linking former-England International Colin Veitch with the position, the club announced on 4 July 1922 that, after interviewing four applicants for the job, they had appointed Cecil Potter. Potter became the first Derby County manager without a previous association with the club, joining the club from his position as manager at Hartlepools, where he had guided the club to a fourth-place finish in the previous season's Football League Third Division North. He brought with him Hartlepool defenders Tom Crilly and Harry Thoms, who went on to make 406 appearances between them for the club.

Derby finished a further two places lower than the previous season in the 1922–23 campaign, but a new team was beginning to take shape. The club also reached its first FA Cup semi-final in 14 years, where they met fellow Second Division club West Ham United, going down 5–2 to miss out on their first Wembley FA Cup final. The 1923–24 season saw a marker improvement and the club finished third in the table, in no small part to the goal-scoring form of Harry Storer. Storer, bought two season before for £4,500 from Grimsby Town as a half-back, spent the season up front and netted 27 goals, including 4 in an 8–0 win away to Bristol City, the club's record away win. Despite finishing the season as the division's top-scorers, Derby missed out on promotion by a single goal, as Bury pipped them to second place on goal average. Going into the final game of the season against Leicester City, Potter's team needed to win by 5 goals to go up, but could only manage 4, missing out by 0.015 of a goal.

In July 1924, Derby finally purchased the Baseball Ground from Sir Francis Ley for £10,000 and started the 1924–25 season strongly, winning 9 of their first 12 games. However, a feeble end to the season, where they won just 2 of their final 11 matches, cost them promotion as their finished third, two points behind Manchester United. Potter left his position of manager after three seasons, with the intention of starting a dairy business in his native Sussex. He instead, however, replaced Herbert Chapman at Huddersfield Town, who had been lured away by Arsenal and won the league title, completing English Football's first ever Championship Hat-Trick in the process.

== Promotion and the first golden era (1924–1939) ==
To replace Potter, Derby tempted former Wolves manager George Jobey out of retirement. Jobey had retired to run a hotel in 1924 after winning the Third Division North with Wolves, but was tempted back into football by the Rams. Jobey imposed firm discipline at the club and earned them promotion in his first season at the club, a feat not emulated for another 70 years. Jobey always displayed a hunger for talented centre forwards, and the key signing was England International Harry Bedford, at a cost of £3,250, from Blackpool, who scored 27 goals as the Rams finished runners up to Sheffield Wednesday in the 1925–26 Second Division table. Bedford was joined in the Rams attack by two other Blackpool strikers towards the end of the season, in the form of Jimmy Gill and George Mee.

The return of First Division football to Derby after a five-year absence saw the main stand of The Baseball Ground expanded, and it reopened in September, remaining until the club left the ground. It allowed the club to record its first attendance over 30,000 when 30,557 turned up for the 2–0 victory over Bolton Wanderers on 27 December 1926. Derby set a club record of 86 goals in a league season, with Bedford and Gill both recording 22 goals each, but a poor defensive performance, shipping 73, meant Derby only finished 12th in the 1926–27 First Division table. Nevertheless, it was the club's highest league finish in 14 years, and the season saw some high scoring encounters, including a 6–3 home victory over Cardiff City, a 4–5 home defeat by Blackburn Rovers, an 8–0 victory over Sheffield Wednesday, and two 4–4 draws in the space of three games, away to Blackburn and at home to Huddersfield. Such high scoring affairs were characteristic of Jobey's reign at Derby, where he seemed more concerned with attacking than keeping games tight.

Goals were very much a feature of the following season too, as the signing of Sammy Crooks, who went on to be one of Derby's greatest ever players, from Durham City for just £300 in April 1927, alongside the continued goalscoring exploits of Harry Bedford, saw Derby hit 96 goals (their highest ever total in a top flight season), including 6 against Blackburn Rovers and 7 against Cardiff City. However, once again, there defence was far from watertight, and an against column of 83 saw them finish the 1927–28 First Division season in 4th, though it was still the club's highest league finish in 30 years. Jobey bought in Jack Barker for £200 from Denaby United in May 1928 to reinforce the backline, but Barker, a commanding presence throughout his time at Derby and who went on to gain 11 England caps, was more interested in attacking and the habit of Derby's goalscoring exploits being undermined by their defence continued into the 1928–29 season, where they recorded a 6th-placed finish. A new record attendance was also set when 30,651 turned up to watch a 1–2 home defeat by Huddersfield Town on Boxing Day 1928.

Derby equalled the closest they had ever come to that point of winning the league in the 1929–30 First Division season, when they finished 2nd, though they were ten points behind leaders Sheffield Wednesday. Despite scoring 90 goals, 30 of which came from Harry Bedford – equalling the club record set by Alf Bentley 20 years before – they conceded 82, and had to settle for the runners-up spot. The season saw Sammy Crooks gain the first of his 26 England Caps in a 5–2 victory over Scotland at Wembley. Crooks made 26 appearances for England in the inter-war years, a record only exceeded by Arsenal's Eddie Hapgood.

December 1930 saw the sale of Harry Bedford, who had hit 142 goals in 203 games, to Newcastle United. Bedford's sale finally meant that Jack Bowers, who has been signed Scunthorpe & Lindsey United in 28 May and used sparingly over the previous two season as Jobey nursed him into being a first team regular (though he had scored 8 in the 9 appearances he made), was able to cement his place in the first team. Making his first appearance in the 10th game of the season, a 4–2 home win over Arsenal (which set the club record of 23 home games without defeat, not equalled until 1995), Bowers went on to feature in every game for the remainder of the season, scoring 37 goals in the process, including 4 in a game three times, and smashing the club's goal scoring records. In January and February he equalled the club record of scoring in six consecutive games, hitting 15, though Derby's now customary shaky defending saw them still manage to lose three of them. Derby finished the 1930–31 First Division season in 6th.

Bowers continued his goal scoring form into the 1931–32 season, hitting 25 goals, but could only finish 15th out of 22 teams. He went even further in the 1932–33 and 1933–34 season as he twice finished the season as the league's top scorer, hitting 35 and 37 respectively. Derby also returned to the top 10, finishing 7th and then 4th, to further cement themselves as one of the country's premier clubs. 1933 also saw Derby reach their 10th semi-final (with Bowers hitting 8, taking his tally for the 1932/33 season to a club record 43 goals), where they were beaten 3–2 by Manchester City. That cup run also saw Derby's record attendance broken in the 6th round, where a 4–4 draw with Sunderland was watched by 34,218. The following season's 4th round tie with Wolves saw the record broken again, thanks to the completion of the double decker Osmaston End stand, as 37,727 saw Derby run out 3–0 winners.

Bowers was subject to a knee injury in November of the 1934–35 season which ruled him out for three months, leading Jobey to buy Hughie Gallacher for £2,750 from Chelsea. Gallagher, one of the all-time great centre forwards, hit 23 goals in just 27 games, including all 5 in a 5–2 victory over Blackburn, as Derby finished 6th. There was also a 9–3 home victory over West Bromwich Albion on 8 December, which saw Derby equal their highest ever league scorer.

Derby's side now boasted England internationals Tom Cooper, Jack Barker, Errington Keen, Sammy Crooks, Jack Bowers and Scottish internationals, Dally Duncan and Hughie Gallacher. Despite this array of talent, the silverware which would cement the reputation of George Jobey and, arguably, the first great Derby side, continued to elude them. The 1935–36 campaign was to be the closest they would come – they finished runners-up for the third time in the club's history, 8 points behind champions Sunderland as they won just 5 of their last 15 matches, finishing above Huddersfield Town on goal average. The 1936 season saw the club open its third new stand in a decade, the Normanton End (all of which lasted until the stadium was demolished) and break its attendance record again – 37,830 attending a 2–0 victory over Nottingham Forest on 25 January 1936. Although the first team could only finish second, the reserves, boosted by the presence of Jack Bowers who hit 30 goals as his slow recovery from the knee injury suffered in 1934 continued, won the club the Central League Championship for the first time.

With Hughie Gallacher sold to Notts County for £2,000 (after hitting 38 goals in just 51 games) Jobey reinforced his side for the 1936–37 season with the capture of Aston Villa strikers Ronnie Dix and Welsh international Dai Astley. Astley went on to hit 29 goals in 30 league and cup games, including three hat-tricks, as the Rams finished fourth. Astley finished top scorer again the following season as Derby finished 13th in the 1937–38 First Division table, a season which included a 7–1 home defeat by Manchester City, the heaviest home defeat in the club's history.

The 1938–39 season was the final full season of English football before it shut down due to World War II. Scottish international Dave McCulloch was signed for a then club record fee of £9,500 from Brentford and, with Ronnie Dix's full international debut for England against Norway, enabled the Rams to field an all international forward line up of Dix, Sammy Crooks (England), McCulloch, Dally Duncan (Scotland) and Dai Astley (Wales), which lasted for two months until Astley was sold Blackpool in January 1939. The season saw the club top of the league for 15 consecutive weeks from October until February but, instead of reaching out, contrived to lose 3 consecutive home games and 9 of their last 14 fixtures and ended up 6th in the table. McCulloch was, harshly, held up to have been a failure – despite hitting 16 in 31 matches and finishing as the club's joint top scorer alongside Ronnie Dix, with contemporary accounts saying the marauding style that had served him so well at Brentford for a more intricate style.

== The War years (1939–1946) ==
A 1939–40 season did start, but was abandoned after three fixtures, which brought 2 wins and a defeat for Derby. Derby where offered a place in a substitute competition but, mindful of criticism of being unpatriotic after continuing on following the outbreak of World War I, tested the water with a friendly against Leeds United. When less than 2,000 supporters turned up (Derby had been regularly attracting gates of 35,000+ towards the end of the 1930s) it was decided to close the club down.

1941 saw the departure of George Jobey from the managers seat after 16 years in charge. Much was made in the contemporary press of how Derby had managed to retain the services of players such as Sammy Crooks, Dally Duncan and Hughie Gallagher for significant periods of time despite never managing in win any major trophies – the question was answered when Jobey was called up before a joint F.A and Football League commission. At the time the maximum wage system was still in place, and was not to be successfully challenged for another 20 years, and the commission, which was, curiously, acting on allegations forwarded by Jobey, who supplied details in support of them, found that 'various payments in excess of those allowed under the transfer, bonus and signing on regulations of the Football League have been made by the Derby County club over a period of 12 seasons.' Jobey, alongside five of the club's directors, were suspended sine die (though Jobey's suspension was lifted in 1945) and the club was fined £500. The fine seemed small for such an offence, but a similar penalty was imposed on Leicester City and the commission was mindful that several clubs were guilty in the same areas.

Jobey marshalled Derby during their first period of continued success. After winning the 1926 Second Division title, Derby became a major force in the top flight of English football and the Baseball Ground crowds were treated to a multitude of international footballers, many of which cost next to nothing, such as Jack Bowers, Jack Barker and Sammy Crooks. Jobey, observing the idea that to win matches you had to score goals, loved centre forwards and brought some of the best in the land whilst at Derby – they scored 90+ goals in the top flight on four times in the 1930s and finished in the top 10 in 10 of the 13 top flight seasons under Jobey, including finishing runners-up twice, the most consistent First Division presence in the club's history. However, as Sammy Crooks stated in later years "We were too much about attack to win the league. Other clubs were better at keeping games tight."

1941 also saw the club reopen after a two-year closure. The majority of the club's players during this two-year break had turned out for local non-league clubs. With the efforts of Jack Nicholas and Jack Webb, the club re-opened and, on Christmas Day 1941, football returned to the Baseball Ground. Derby joined the Football League North in 1942–43, a programme which saw the league run in two-halves, one pre-Christmas and one post, and the confusion was further aided by the Football League War Cup, which later changed its name to the Midland Cup. The regular fixtures meant that Derby, with Jack Nicholas manager in all but name, relied heavily on youngsters and guest players. With war service spreading players all over the country, 'guests' were a vital method of allowing clubs to field competitive sides and it was through this system that two of Derby's greatest players – Peter C. Doherty and Raich Carter, former Championship winners with Manchester City and Sunderland respectively – who were both stationed in Loughborough. With the addition of these two, and the appointment in Match 1945 of Ted Magner, the first official successor to George Jobey, Derby won the double of the 1944–45 Football League North (Second Session) and the Midland Cup, beating Aston Villa 9–0 on aggregate. The end of World War II in 1945 came too late for a resumption of League football, but a 1945–46 FA Cup competition was held.

=== FA Cup triumph ===
As no guests were allowed in the 1945–46 FA Cup campaign Magner had to act quick to secure the signatures of Doherty and Carter, acquiring them for £6,000 each from Manchester City and Sunderland respectively. To make up for no league programme, each round of the FA Cup (save the semis and the final) was played over two legs.

1946 FA Cup Final
- Event: 1945–46 FA Cup
Derby County	Charlton Athletic
4	1
- Date: 27 April 1946
- Venue: Wembley Stadium, London
- Referee: E.D. Smith
- Attendance: 98, 215

The third round saw Derby run out 9–0 winners over Luton Town on aggregate, winning 6–0 at Kenilworth Road, with 4 goals from Jack Stamps, and 3–0 at the Baseball Ground. After overseeing this victory Magner left the club to move abroad and become manager of FC Metz. He was replaced by Stuart McMillan, who had appeared once for Derby and had operated in various capacities for the club, including scout under Jobey and as adviser to the club under Magner. The change of manager did not affect Derby's form and W.B.A. were dispatched 4–1 on aggregate in the fourth round (1–0 at home, 3–1 away), followed with a 10–1 aggregate victory over Brighton & Hove Albion (4–1 away, 6–0 at home), to set up a Quarter-final with Aston Villa.

Derby played in the 1945–46 Football League South alongside the FA Cup and, in a 2–1 home victory over Swansea Town, saw first choice goalkeeper Frank Boulton injured in a clash with Trevor Ford and miss the rest of the cup run. Although reserve keeper Billy Townsend acted as custodian for the quarter-final and, although he helped Derby progress after 4–3 victory at Villa Park and a 1–1 draw at the Baseball Ground, Derby weren't happy and, in March 1946, signed former England No. 1 Vic Woodley from non-league Bath City. Derby also lost Sammy Crooks to injury for the remainder of the competition when he was injured in the second leg against Aston Villa.

The FA Cup semi-final, the eleventh in the club's history, saw them drawn against Birmingham City, managed by former Derby player Harry Storer. Following a 0–0 draw at Hillsborough in front of 65,000, a replay was played four days later and Derby ran out 4–0 winners after extra time at Maine Road in front of 80, 407 – a record attendance for a midweek game between two Football League cups outside an FA Cup final. Derby suffered yet another injury blow when Jack Parr, an ever-present in the run to the final, suffered a broken right arm in a 4–3 Football League South win over Luton Town a week later, forcing him to miss the final.

Prior to the final, captain Jack Nicholas was taken to a Gypsy camp in an attempt to alleviate the curse placed on the club due to gypsy anger at the Baseball Ground being built on a Gypsy camping ground over 50 years previously. The evicted gypsies had stated the club would never win the FA Cup, and 3 final defeats, alongside 7 unsuccessful Semi finals, gave rise to superstition within the club. There was also the issue of finding better seats at Wembley for the players wives; they were originally placed in the open, at the mercy of the elements, leaving the senior players to serve the ultimatum – better seats or no match.

The format of the 1945/46 FA Cup meant Derby's first ever appearance at Wembley after playing a total of 10 matches and scoring 33 goals, including 12 from Sammy Crooks and 10 from Peter Doherty. A crowd of 98, 215 – the biggest crowd ever to watch Derby County – saw the Rams against Charlton Athletic. The first goal came in the 85th minute when Charlton's Bert Turner put through his own goal, the first ever own goal in an FA Cup final, to give Derby the lead before he himself equalised with a free kick, which deflected of Dally Duncan to wrong foot Vic Woodley, one minute later. There was still time for Jack Stamps to almost score a winner for Derby, when he shot on target in the last minute of normal time – but the effort died when the ball burst on the way to the goal.

Extra time was all Derby and, after Doherty gave Derby the lead in the 92nd minutes, Jack Stamps took centre stage and grabbed a brace (97 and 106) to secure the game 4–1 and win the first major trophy in the club's history.

== Resumption of League Football and decline (1946–1955) ==
Flush with the success of their first major cup win, Derby entered into the 1946–47 campaign with a renewed vigour. However, the 1946 Cup winning side never appeared together in the entire season, with four leaving the club shortly after winning the trophy. This was compounded by the double blow of losing Peter C. Doherty (who left for Huddersfield Town after falling out of the club for denying him the opportunity to take over the Arboretum Hotel) and Dally Duncan, who left to become coach at Luton Town. The end of a disappointing campaign saw Vic Woodley return to Bath City and club captain Jack Nicholas retire. Derby finished the season, mid-table, in 14th, but chairman Ben Robshaw was determined for the Rams to maintain the success of the 1930s and sanctioned McMillan to break the English transfer record with the £15,500 capture of Billy Steel from Greenock Morton. The capture revitalised the club, as it finished the 1947–48 campaign in 4th and reached yet another FA Cup Semi-final, losing 3–1 to Manchester United at Hillsborough. The British Transfer Record was broken again in March 1948 as Johnny Morris was signed from Manchester United for £24,500. He hit 13 goals in 13 games as the Rams managed to go one better and finish 3rd in the 1948–49 First Division table, the success seeing the club's average attendance hit a then club record of 29, 798. For much of the season Derby had looked more than capable of winning the title for the first time; They opened the season with 26 points from a possible 32, going unbeaten until their 17th fixture. However, just 6 wins from the next 17 matches put paid to any hopes of the title before 6 win from the final 7 helped the club finish 3rd, a position they would not equal or surpass for another 23 years.

In 1949, Derby once again fell foul of the footballing authorities. Jack Cattarall, the club secretary from March 1945 to July 1946, had been dismissed by the club after they discovered he was an undischarged bankrupt and found financial irregularities from his time in office. This led to an investigation by the Football League auditors who summoned another joint commission with the FA, mainly focused on accusations of payment of excessive wages, as it had under Jobey's reign, concerning a Czechoslovak tour undertaken by the, then, cup holders. The club admitted to the charges but denied instructing Cattarall to commit the offence. However, the club's 1941 suspensions counted against them and club chairman, Ben Robshaw, was suspended sine die for a second time, leaving football all together, as was Cattarall, who committed suicide in 1954. Robshaw, who had twice broken the transfer record and was a forward thinking chairman, was replaced by Ossie Jackson, who oversaw a steady decline in the club's fortunes.

The next season, 1949–50 campaign saw the club finish 11th in the table, though it broke its attendance record again when 38,063 saw the 4–2 win over Northampton Town in the FA Cup 5th round. It also saw another FA Cup winner departing to Huddersfield Town, as Jack Howe left the club after a 13-year association.

The 11th-placed finish was repeated in the 1950 – 51 season campaign, with the sale of Billy Steel to Dundee for £23,000 in September setting a new club record for a fee received. Jack Lee, who had joined from Leicester in June, finished the season as top scorer with 28 goals, including four in a 6–5 victory over Sunderland in December, and played and scored for England in a 4–1 win over Northern Ireland at Windsor Park. It was his only cap, and marked the final occasion a Derby player would represent the nation of another 20 years.

The ageing stars of the late 1940s were not being replaced by those of the same calibre and, from 1951 onwards, the club's decline became even more apparent. After finishing 17th in 1951 – 52, the club's lowest finish since it had returned to the top flight in 1926, Derby were finally relegated in the 1952 – 53 season. The club was in trouble from the very start, losing 6 of their first 8 games, and when Jimmy Dunn was bought for £15,000 in December to add goals to a team increasingly reliant on Jack Lee, form improved with 4 wins in six, with Dunn netting 3. This mini upturn also saw Jack Stamps grab his 100th, and final, league goal for the club in a 4–0 victory over Stoke City on 6 December. However, Dunn was soon ruled out for the rest of the campaign after a cartilage operation and the club only recorded 4 victories in the next 20 matches, a run which included 10 without a win, eventually finishing bottom. Relegation ended a 27-year stay in the top flight, which today stands as by far the club's longest consecutive stay in the top flight.

The return to Second Division football did not go as well as the club would have hoped and, after a poor start, which saw just 6 wins from 18 matches, Stuart McMillan was sacked after almost eight years in charge. His replacement was former Derby and England centre-half Jack Barker, who, after retiring from playing professionally, had worked as manager at Bradford City and Dundalk before returning to Derby to work at Rolls-Royce. Barker struggled to turn the Rams around, and they won only 6 of his 25 games in charge, 4 of which came in Barker's first 7 games, and endured a 14-match winless streak between 16 January and 16 April 1954. They eventually finished 18th in the 1953–54 Second Division table, the lowest finish in the club's history. just 5 years after finishing 3rd in the First Division.

Barker's first full season in charge did not go any better and, despite investing over £40,000 in players such as future Scottish international Stewart Imlach, former England forward Jesse Pye and Celtic goalkeeper George Hunter, the club lost its status as a full member of the football league for the only time in its history as it was relegated from the 1954–55 Second Division in bottom place. The club managed only 7 wins all season, winning just 2 of the last 22 fixtures. Whilst a 6–1 victory over Port Vale on 5 February offered a spasm off hope, it was followed by a 14-match winless streak which only ended on the last day of the season, when it was too late, with a 3–0 victory over Hull City. Attendances dropped to an average of just 15,000, the lowest since the 1920s, and, with the close season departure to Boston United of Reg Harrison, the last of the FA Cup winning side at the club, went any connection with the Golden age of the 1930s and 1940s.

== Third Tier football (1954–1957) ==
The club reacted to relegation in 1954–55 by sacking Jack Barker, whose 19 months in charge at the Baseball Ground left him very bitter: "I wouldn't be a manager again for £10,000 a week. The trouble is that the people you are working for know nothing about the game." He was replaced by another former Derby and England player Harry Storer, who had a good record at getting clubs promoted from the lower leagues, having got Coventry City to the Second Division in 1936 and Birmingham City to the First Division in 1948.

"I chose the manager as well as the club. I'd always admired Harry Storer. He had a sharp tongue, a heart of gold and a fantastic knowledge of the game."

— Reg 'Paddy' Ryan on Harry Storer

Storer walked into a club with a £60,000 overdraft and shattered morale. Making it his priority to establish leadership and discipline on the field, as well as off it, Storer made the inspirational capture of FA Cup-winner Reg Ryan for just £3,000 from West Bromwich Albion. The 1955–56 Football League Third Division was Derby's first ever season outside of the top two divisions and the club responded positively to the challenge, racking up a club record 63 points and 110 league goals (24 of which came from Jack Parry in just 34 appearances), only failing to score in 6 of their 42 games and, between 14 January and 31 March, also embarking on a run of 11 wins in 13 games as they finished runners-up to Champions Grimsby Town. However, at the time, only the first placed team were promoted and Derby missed out. The club also entered the FA Cup at the first round stage for the first time in its history and, after being taken to a replay by Crook Town, endured arguably the worst single playing day in the club's history when they were crushed 6–1 at home to Boston United in the second round. The Boston side contained six ex-Rams and the defeat was the largest ever inflicted on a league club by a non-league club.

Storer and Derby put these disappointments behind them in the following campaign and won the 1956–57 Football League Third Division and, with it, promotion, in style. They equalled the previous season's 63 points and set a new club record of 111 league goals, a club-record equalling 37 of which came from Ray Straw. Straw had been with the club since 1952, but didn't establish himself until halfway through the 1955–56 campaign, from which he hit 14 goals in 23 games. He also equalled the club record of scoring in six consecutive games in September. The style and success of Storer's attacking football saw the club regularly gather 20,000 home gates for the first time since relegation from the First Division, and even attracted 29,886 for the visit of Chesterfield in April 1957, a match in which they recorded their biggest win of the season with a 7–1 victory.

== Return to the Second Division and treading water (1957–1967) ==
Derby enjoyed only a moderate return to Second Division football, finishing the 1957–58 season in 16th. Goals proved a problem, especially when Straw, who had scored 60 goals in just 98 appearances, was sold to Coventry City after injuring an ankle in the 1957 close season tour of the Netherlands. Another key figure of the 1957 promotion, Paddy Ryan, also joined Coventry the following season.

Derby enjoyed a poor start to the 1958–59 season, earning just 4 wins in their opening 17 fixtures. However, the club rallied together and, after a 5–0 defeat away to Middlesbrough on 22 November, lost only 5 of their last 22 league games to finish 7th. However, this finish proved to be a false dawn as the club could only register an 18th-place finish in the 1959–60 season. Gates began to suffer as the club began to look increasingly unambitious, and they fell from 20,000 for the season opener against Rotherham United to just 10,440 for the final day victory over Lincoln City.

Storer bought in Bill Curry from Brighton and Hove Albion for £12,000 in the 1960–61 season in an attempt to bring an extra flourish to the stagnating Rams team. Curry proved a success, hitting 19 league goals in 30 appearances, though the club could once again only record a mid-table finish, ending 12th out of 20 teams. The 1960–61 also saw the introduction of the Football League Cup, with Derby's first ever appearance in the competition producing a 5–2 first-round victory away to Watford in the first round, eventually reaching the 3rd round where they lost 4–1 at home to Norwich City. Another season of mid-table obscurity (finishing 16th) in 1961–62 was to be Storer's final contribution to Derby County, as he retired in 1962, at the age of 64, after seven years as the club, citing a need the need to make way for a younger man. Storer's spell as manager had revived a club in a significant slump as it fell in the Football League North and his frugality in the transfer market had significantly reduced the club's overdraft, though he failed to make significant progress in the second tier. He was replaced by yet another former Derby player, Tim Ward, who had spent 14 years at the club between 1937 and 1951 as a classy left half, capped twice for England.

"The job has been the toughest I have ever had, and the shortage of money has been frustrating. The trouble with this club is that you can't put a threepenny stamp on a letter without consulting the board personally. I was told that money was available but I could never get an answer when I asked how much"

— Tim Ward on his time as Derby manager

Ward's management career had started in odd fashion, with an 8-day stint at Exeter City manager. After being appointed manager on 4 March 1953, and despite travelling to their Third Division South match against Ipswich Town, Barnsley, who had never released Ward, recalled him on 12 March and appointed him manager two weeks later. Though he arrived too late to save Barnsley from relegation, he achieved promotion straight away as Third Division North Champions in 1954. Though Barnsley were relegated again five years later, he was still comfortably established at Oakwell until joining Grimsby in January 1960. Another promotion followed as Grimsby finished runners up in the 1961–62 Third Division, just three points behind winners Portsmouth. His success at Grimsby saw him coveted by Derby County, who appointed him manager ahead of the 1962–63 season.

Ward's first season proved difficult and saw the club record just 1 win their first 15 games, before a run of just 4 defeats in 15 from late March until the end of the season saw the club finish 18th. Ward made the first of several key signings whilst he was at the club with the capture of inside forward Alan Durban for just £10,000 from Cardiff City in July 1963, and gave an increased first team role to Ron Webster, who had been at the club as a youngster since Harry Storer's reign. Durban finished as top scorer, though he only hit 9 goals, as Derby improved slightly to record a finish of 13th in the 1963–64 Second Division. The season also saw Jack Parry hit his 100th league goal for the club, becoming only the 6th player to do so after Steve Bloomer, Jack Bowers, Harry Bedford, Sammy Crooks and Jackie Stamps, when he scored in a 3–0 home win over Swansea Town. The gradual improvement under Ward continued into the 1964–65 campaign, where Durban linked up well with new signing Eddie Thomas, signed for just £3,500 from Swansea Town, as they both hit 22 league goals to help the Rams record a finish of 9th. The success of Thomas, who scored in each of his first 6 appearances for Derby to equal the club record, as later cited by Ward as counting against him – "(Thomas) proved a marvellous bargain and after that I was expected to sign other players as cheaply." The success of the Thomas/Durban partnership carried over into the 1965–66 season, where they both hit 17 goals, and the club climbed one place further to finish 8th, despite equalling the club's worst ever start to a league season by losing their first 4 games. The introduction of substitutions to English football saw Bobby Saxton become Derby County's first ever substitute player when he replaced Geoff Barrowcliffe after just 14 minutes of the opening day defeat by Southampton. Barrowcliffe went on to make his 500th appearance for the club when he started the 2–1 away defeat by Carlisle United on 7 September, only the fourth player to do so after Jimmy Methven, Steve Bloomer and his teammate Jack Parry.

The gradual improvement under Ward seemed to free the wallet of the board and, ahead of the 1966–67 season, broke the club transfer record with the £40,000 signing of Kevin Hector from Bradford Park Avenue, where he had hit 113 goals in just 176 games. It was the first sign of any ambition from Derby since the late 1940s and he scored on his home debut against Huddersfield Town in a 4–3 victory. Hector finished the season as top scorer with 16 in 30 games but, despite his success, Derby plunged to 17th in the table and it was decided not to renew the contract of Ward after five season as manager. Ward's five years at Derby were blighted by a lack of cash and a parochial attitude of the boardroom, but he is often credited with laying the foundations for the success of the 1970s, thanks to the signings of Hector and Durban, as well as providing first team football for Ron Webster, Colin Boulton and Peter Daniel, all of whom were part of the club's later title winning sides. Ward's replacements were Brian Clough and Peter Taylor who, between them, brought a revolution to the club.
