= 1945–46 Derby County F.C. season =

Derby County
1945–46 season
- Manager: Stuart McMillan
- Stadium: Baseball Ground
- Football League South: 4th (52 Points)
- FA Cup: Winners
Home colours

The 1945–46 season saw Derby compete in the wartime Southern Division, as well as the F.A. Cup, which they went on to win.

Derby broke a club record in this season, when they went matches 17 unbeaten, until losing to Coventry City in March 1946. Derby's sixth round FA cup tie against Aston Villa set an attendance record at Villa Park of 76,500 spectators, a record which remains to the present day.

Left-half Tommy Eggleston, who had joined Derby 10 years prior in 1946, made his only senior appearance for the club in the FA Cup 3rd round second leg tie against Luton, before his transfer to Leicester City.

== Competitions ==
=== South Region War League ===
Through the Second World War, the Football League North and Football League South divisions of the Football League were created temporarily to limit travel distances between games. Despite starting in 1940, there was only one full season in 1945–46. Derby participated in the southern division.

Pos	Team	Pld	W	D	L	GF	GA	GR	Pts
2	Aston Villa	42	25	11	6	106	58	1.828	61
3	Charlton Athletic	42	25	10	7	92	45	2.044	60
4	Derby County	42	22	8	12	104	62	1.677	52
5	West Bromwich Albion	42	22	8	12	104	69	1.507	52
6	Wolverhampton Wanderers	42	20	11	11	75	48	1.563	51

Source: rsssf.com and War Hammers II

=== F.A. Cup ===
5 January 1946 Third round	Luton	0–6	Derby	Luton
		Report	Crooks; Carter; Stamps	Stadium: Kenilworth Road; Attendance: 16,792

9 January 1946 Third round	Derby	3-0 (9-0 agg.)	Luton	Derby
	Carter 25', 33'; Morrison 90'	Report		Stadium: Baseball Ground; Attendance: 16,629; Referee: W. F. Daley

26 January 1946 Fourth round	Derby	1-0	West Bromwich Albion	Derby
	Doherty 60'	Report		Stadium: Baseball Ground; Attendance: 31,795; Referee: P. Snape

30 January 1946 Fourth round	West Bromwich Albion	1-3 (1-4 agg.)	Derby	West Bromwich
	Clarke 52'	Report	Carter 25'; Stamps 60' (pen.); Harrison 79'	Stadium: The Hawthorns; Attendance: 37,734; Referee: P. Snape

9 February 1946 Fifth round	Brighton	1-4	Derby	Brighton
	Willemse 60'	Report	Doherty 33', 85' (pen.); Carter 52', 81'	Stadium: Goldstone Ground; Referee: G. Clarke

13 February 1946 Fifth round	Derby	6-0 (10-1 agg.)	Brighton	Derby
	Doherty 7', 39'; Carter 9', 13', 52'; Crooks 54'	Report		Stadium: Baseball Ground; Attendance: 32,000

2 March 1946 Sixth round	Aston Villa	3-4	Derby	Birmingham
	Edwards 6'; Iverson 28'; Broome 66'	Report	Doherty 23', 85'; Carter 62'; Crooks 88'	Stadium: Villa Park; Attendance: 76,500

9 March 1946 Sixth round	Derby	1-1 (5-4 agg.)	Aston Villa	Derby
	Carter 44'	Report	Broome	Stadium: Baseball Ground; Attendance: 32,000; Referee: W. E. Ross-Gower

23 March 1946 Semi-finals	Derby	1-1	Birmingham	Sheffield
	Carter 4'	Report	Mulraney 59'	Stadium: Hillsborough Stadium; Attendance: 65,000; Referee: W. H. E. Evans

27 March 1946 Semi-finals (Replay)	Birmingham	0-4 (a.e.t.)	Derby	Manchester
		Report	Doherty 96', 112'; Stamps 103', 118'	Stadium: Maine Road; Attendance: 80,407; Referee: W. H. E. Evans

27 April 1946 Final	Derby	4-1 (a.e.t.)	Charlton Athletic	London
15:00 BST	B. Turner 85' (o.g.); Doherty 92'; Stamps 97', 106'	Report	B. Turner 86'	Stadium: Wembley; Attendance: 98,000; Referee: Eddie Smith

=== Friendlies ===
9 May 1945	Derby	2-2	Nottingham Forest	Derby
	Doherty	Report	Betts; Leverton	Stadium: Baseball Ground

17 August 1945	Nottingham Forest	1-4	Derby	Nottingham
	Martin	Report	Carter; Duncan; Attwood	Stadium: City Ground; Attendance: 8,000

== Statistics ==
=== Appearances and goals ===
No.	Pos	Nat	Player	Total		FA Cup	
No.	Pos	Nat	Player	Apps	Goals	Apps	Goals
Goalkeepers
	GK	(England) ENG	Frank Boulton	6	0	6	0
	GK	(England) ENG	Bill Townsend	2	0	2	0
	GK	(England) ENG	Vic Woodley	3	0	3	0
Defenders
	DF	(England) ENG	Tommy Eggleston	1	0	1	0
	DF	(England) ENG	Jack Howe	2	0	2	0
	DF	(England) ENG	Leon Leuty	10	0	10	0
	DF	(England) ENG	Jackie Parr	10	0	10	0
	DF		George Wilcox	0	0	0	0
Midfielders
	MF	(Scotland) SCO	Jim Bullions	11	0	11	0
	MF	(Scotland) SCO	Steve McLachlan	0	0	0	0
	MF	(England) ENG	Chick Musson	9	0	9	0
	MF	(Wales) WAL	Jack Nicholas	11	0	11	0
	MF	(England) ENG	Tim Ward	1	0	1	0
Forwards
	FW	(England) ENG	Raich Carter	11	12	11	12
	FW	(England) ENG	Sammy Crooks	5	3	5	3
	FW	(Northern Ireland) NIR	Peter Doherty	10	11	10	11
	FW	(Scotland) SCO	Dally Duncan	9	0	9	0
	FW	(England) ENG	Reg Harrison	6	1	6	1
	FW	(Scotland) SCO	Angus Morrison	6	1	6	1
	FW	(England) ENG	Jackie Stamps	8	10	8	10

Source: Derby County football club players
