= Arthur Betts =

Arthur Betts may refer to:

- Arthur Betts (cricketer) (1880–1948), Australian cricketer
- Arthur Betts (footballer, born 1886) (1886–1967), English association footballer for Derby County and Watford
- Arthur Betts (footballer, born 1917) (1917–1978), English professional footballer for Nottingham Forest F.C.
