= Eddie Hapgood =

English footballer & manager (1908–1973)

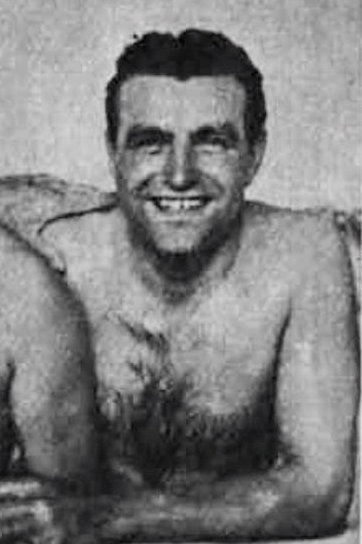

Personal information
- Full name: Edris Albert Hapgood
- Date of birth: 24 September 1908
- Place of birth: Bristol, England
- Date of death: 20 April 1973 (aged 64)
- Place of death: Leamington Spa, Warwickshire, England
- Height: 1.75 m (5 ft 9 in)
- Position: Full-back

Senior career*
Years	Team	Apps	(Gls)
1927	Kettering Town	12	(0)
1927–1944	Arsenal	393	(2)
1944	Chelsea	0	(0)
Total		405	(2)

International career
1933–1939	England	30	(0)

Managerial career
- 1944–1947: Blackburn Rovers
- 1948–1950: Watford
- 1950–1956: Bath City
- * Club domestic league appearances and goals

Edris Albert "Eddie" Hapgood (24 September 1908 – 20 April 1973) was an English footballer, who captained both Arsenal and England during the 1930s.

== Playing career ==
Hapgood was born in Bristol and started his footballing career in the mid-1920s as an amateur playing in local football in the Bristol Downs Association Football League for St Phillip's Marsh Adult School Juniors (while employed as a milkman), before getting his big break at Kettering Town in the Southern League. He was signed by Herbert Chapman's Arsenal for £950 in 1927. Initially a thin and fragile player, Arsenal's trainer Tom Whittaker forced him to take up weight training, and abandon his vegetarianism, and Hapgood eventually became known for his physique and power. He supplemented his footballer's maximum wage by fashion modelling and advertising chocolate.

Hapgood made his Arsenal debut on 19 November 1927 against Birmingham City but was initially used as backup for left back Horace Cope; he did not become Arsenal's regular left back until early 1929, but after that he made the position his own, right up until the outbreak of World War II in 1939. He played in Arsenal's 2–1 victory over Sheffield Wednesday in the Charity Shield at Stamford Bridge in October 1930. Arsenal won the match 2–1. He played 35 or more matches in every season in that period, earning a reputation as an elegant and unruffled defender; he even deputised as goalkeeper on two occasions when Frank Moss was injured. Hapgood went on to succeed Alex James as Arsenal captain, leading the side to the league title in 1937–38, whilst personally winning five League Championships and two FA Cups.

Hapgood also played for England 30 times, making his debut against Italy in Rome, on 13 May 1933, which finished in a 1–1 draw. Hapgood became England captain and wore the armband 21 times; his first match as captain was the infamous "Battle of Highbury" on 14 November 1934, against Italy, who were reigning World Champions at the time. England had not taken part in the World Cup, so the match was billed as the "true" World Championship match. The match was notoriously dirty, with many players sustaining injuries, including Hapgood himself with a broken nose; England beat the Italians (who were reduced to ten men for most of the match) 3–2.

Hapgood also captained England in another infamous match, against Germany in Berlin on 14 May 1938, where Hapgood and his players were made to give the Nazi salute before the match, under pressure from British diplomats. Hitler was not in attendance; England won the match 6–3.

The Second World War cut short Hapgood's playing career (he was only 30 when hostilities broke out). Hapgood served in the Royal Air Force during the war, whilst also playing for Arsenal and England in unofficial matches. In June 1940, he was one of five Arsenal players who guested for Southampton in a victory over Fulham at Craven Cottage. He also appeared as a guest player for West Ham United later in Second World War. It was during the war that Hapgood fell out with the Arsenal management, after he was loaned out to Chelsea and eventually left the club under a dark cloud. He played 440 times in all for Arsenal, scoring two goals.

== Post-playing career ==
In 1945, he wrote one of the first footballing autobiographies, entitled Football Ambassador, and after the war moved into management. He had stints in charge of Blackburn Rovers, and then Watford and Bath City. After that he left football completely; he fell on hard times and wrote back to his old club Arsenal asking for financial assistance (as he had never been given a testimonial match) but the club only sent him £30. He spent his later years running a YMCA hostel in Harwell, Berkshire and Egdon Hall (hostel for UKAEA apprentices) in Lynch Lane Weymouth, Dorset. He died in Leamington Spa, Warwickshire, on Good Friday 1973 at the age of 64.

== Honours ==
Arsenal

- Football League First Division: 1930–31, 1932–33, 1933–34, 1934–35, 1937–38
- FA Cup: 1929–30, 1935–36; runner-up: 1931–32
- FA Charity Shield: 1930, 1931, 1933, 1934

Individual

- Football League 100 Legends
