= Steve McLachlan =

Scottish footballer

Personal information
- Full name: Stephen McLacklan
- Date of birth: 19 September 1918
- Place of birth: Kirkcudbright, Scotland
- Date of death: 26 July 1990 (aged 71)
- Place of death: Dumfries, Scotland
- Height: 5 ft 8 in (1.73 m)
- Position: Wing half

Youth career
- St Cuthbert Wanderers
- ?–1938: Dalbeattie
- 1938–1939: Derby County

Senior career*
Years	Team	Apps	(Gls)
1939–1953	Derby County	58	(1)
1953–1955	Kilmarnock	18	(1)
- * Club domestic league appearances and goals

Stephen McLachlan (19 September 1918 – 26 July 1990) was a Scottish professional footballer who played as a wing half. He spent most of his career with Derby County, yet was often utilised as a reserve player and featured in less than 60 league games over a 14-year period. He later transferred to Kilmarnock where he was released after two years.

McLachlan died in July 1990 after a period of ill health.

== Early life ==
During World War II, McLachlan served with the Durham Light Infantry unit, latterly as a sergeant and won a distinguished service medal. During his youth, he played football with St Cuthbert Wanderers.

== Career ==
McLachlan joined Derby County in 1938, when he was signed by manager George Jobey in March 1938 from Dalbeattie, a junior club based in Scotland. He was 18 years old when he signed, but did not make his debut into league football until the following year against Preston North End. McLachlan was utilised mostly as a reserve player, with just brief appearances in the senior team, although refused several offers to move to other clubs when interest was shown.

At the end of the 1952–53 season, McLachlan was placed on Derby's transfer list, alongside Bill Townsend and Jackie Parr, all of whom had been with the club since prior to World War II. McLachlan played for Derby in 63 senior games, of which 5 were in the FA Cup. His best run of games came during the 1951–52 season, when he featured 28 times.

He transferred to Kilmarnock in June 1953 for a small fee and ended his career in Scotland. He was released by Kilmarnock in May 1955, after featuring in 28 games over two seasons, his last being in September 1954.

== Personal life ==
McLachlan died on 26 July 1990 in Dumfries, Scotland after a period of deteriorating health. He was survived by his widow (Jean McLachlan, d.2010) and son. News of his death wasn't reported in England until January 1991.

== Career statistics ==
Appearances and goals by club, season and competition
Club	Season	League			FA Cup		League Cup		Total	
Club	Season	Division	Apps	Goals	Apps	Goals	Apps	Goals	Apps	Goals
Derby County	1938–39	First Division	1	0	0	0	—		1	0
Derby County	1945–46	—			0	0	—		0	0
Derby County	1946–47	First Division	6	0	0	0	—		6	0
Derby County	1947–48	First Division	0	0	0	0	—		0	0
Derby County	1948–49	First Division	3	0	1	0	—		4	0
Derby County	1949–50	First Division	2	0	0	0	—		2	0
Derby County	1950–51	First Division	8	0	0	0	—		8	0
Derby County	1951–52	First Division	26	1	2	0	—		28	1
Derby County	1952–53	First Division	12	0	2	1	—		14	0
Derby County	Total		58	1	5	1	—		63	2
Kilmarnock	1953–54	Scottish Division B	18	1	0	0	6	0	24	1
Kilmarnock	1954–55	Scottish Division A	0	0	0	0	4	0	4	0
Kilmarnock	Total		18	1	0	0	10	0	28	1
Career total			76	2	5	1	10	0	91	3
