= Jackie Parr =

English footballer

Personal information
- Full name: Jack Parr
- Date of birth: 21 November 1920
- Place of birth: Derby, England
- Date of death: 28 March 1985 (aged 64)
- Position: Full-back

Youth career
- Holbrook Miners Welfare
- ????–1937: Little Eaton St Peter's
- 1937–1945: Derby County

Senior career*
Years	Team	Apps	(Gls)
1945–1953	Derby County	112	(0)
1953–1956	Shrewsbury Town	112	(0)
1956–1957	Gresley Rovers		
1957	Burton Albion		
1957–1958	Gresley Rovers		
1958–????	Belper Town		
Total		224	(0)
- * Club domestic league appearances and goals

Jack Parr (21 November 1920 – 28 March 1985) was an English footballer who played in the Football League for Derby County and Shrewsbury Town, among others.

== Career ==
=== Early career ===
Parr played for Holbrook Miners Welfare during his youth, as well as Little Eaton St Peter's, where he later became captain. He signed amateur forms with Derby in December 1937, not long before the outbreak of World War II. He frequently played for the club during the war seasons. Parr was spotted by Derby while playing against them during a game for Holbrook, having just returned from a leg injury. He remarked during a 1977 interview that had he not sustained the injury, he may not have had the opportunity to later play against Derby.

=== Main career ===
During Derby's 1945–46 season, where they won in the 1946 FA Cup final, Parr played in every game of the cup competition, except for the final, as he fractured his arm three weeks beforehand. He featured in a total of 134 games for Derby during peacetime.

Following the conclusion of the 1952–53 season, Parr left Derby to join Shrewsbury Town in July 1953, despite a late bid from West Bromwich Albion. He left the club in May 1956 on a free transfer.

=== Late career ===
In August 1956, Parr signed for Gresley Rovers, then managed by former team-mate Sammy Crooks. He later joined Burton Albion in June 1957, also then managed by Crooks, where he made six appearances in the first team before being released in November the same year. Parr re-signed for Gresley Rovers that same month and later for Belper Town in May 1958. In May 1959, Parr was announced as having moved into a player-coach role for Belper Town.

== Death ==
Parr died on 28 March 1985 in hospital and was survived by his wife and children. He was cremated the following month.
