= Ray Bowden =

English footballer

Personal information
- Full name: Edwin Raymond Bowden
- Date of birth: 13 September 1909
- Place of birth: Looe, England
- Date of death: 23 September 1998 (aged 89)
- Place of death: Plymouth, England
- Position: Inside forward

Senior career*
Years	Team	Apps	(Gls)
- Looe
1926–1933	Plymouth Argyle	145	(82)
1933–1937	Arsenal	123	(42)
1937–1939	Newcastle United	48	(6)

International career
1934–1936	England	6	(1)
- * Club domestic league appearances and goals

Edwin Raymond Bowden (13 September 1909 – 23 September 1998) was an English footballer who played as an inside forward. He scored 130 goals from 316 appearances in the Football League, playing for Plymouth Argyle, Arsenal and Newcastle United. (Note: Bowden played three matches and scored three goals – a hat-trick in an 8–1 defeat of Swansea Town – in the 1939–40 Football League season abandoned at the outbreak of the Second World War. Most statistical sources do not count matches from this season as part of a player's league record, although Joyce's Football League Players' Records does.) He was capped six times and scored once for England.

== Life and career ==
Bowden was born in Looe, Cornwall, and worked as a solicitor's clerk after he left school. He began his football career with the local non-league club, Looe F.C., for whom he scored more than 100 goals in a single season, including 10 in one match. He was spotted by Plymouth Argyle, signed amateur forms with them in 1926, and turned professional the following year. Still only 17 years old and of apparently frail physique, Bowden made his senior debut in March 1927. After two appearances the following season produced four goals, he took over the centre-forward position at the start of the 1928–29 season and went on to score 20 goals from 29 Third Division South matches. In 1929–30, his 18 goals from 28 league matches helped Argyle gain promotion to the Second Division as champions. In 1931, he was a member of the Football Association touring party that made a 17-match visit to Canada. On his return, he top-scored for Argyle for the second time – the first was in 1928–29 – and by the time he left the club, he had taken his totals to 82 goals from 145 league matches.

Bowden signed for Herbert Chapman's Arsenal in March 1933 for £4,500, as the intended replacement for David Jack. He scored in the first two of the seven First Division matches he played in what remained of that season – not enough for a league-winners' medal – but was a regular for the next two campaigns, as Arsenal won two more titles on the trot. Playing mainly as an inside forward, behind Ted Drake, he still scored his fair share despite his slight build in what was at the time a very physical game. His goalscoring included a haul of 13 in 1933–34, which made him Arsenal's top scorer in the league, jointly with Cliff Bastin, and 14 in 1934–35, which included a hat-trick in an 8–1 defeat of Liverpool. Bowden won his first cap for England that season, against Wales on 29 September 1934. Two months later, he was one of seven Arsenal players who played in England's 3–2 win against 1934 World Cup-winners Italy in the so-called "Battle of Highbury", during which he injured an ankle. In all Bowden represented his country six times and scored once, against Wales in February 1936; he also played twice for the Football League XI.

Bowden and Arsenal won the FA Cup in 1935–36, but by then his ankle was causing him problems, limiting his appearances for the club that season and the next. By the start of the 1937–38 season he had seemingly bounced back, playing ten matches in the first two months of the campaign, but in a reshuffle of the side he was sold to Second Division Newcastle United in November 1937 for £5,000 as Arsenal went on to win the First Division title without him. In all he played 138 matches for the Gunners, scoring 48 goals.

Bowden was a regular for Newcastle United for the next two years; the club narrowly escaped relegation in his first season. When first-class football was suspended on the outbreak of the Second World War, the 30-year-old Bowden decided to retire. After the war, he returned to Plymouth where he ran a sports shop with his brother. He died in 1998, aged 89, by which time he was the last surviving player of the great interwar Arsenal side.

== Honours ==
Plymouth Argyle

- Football League Third Division South: 1929–30

Arsenal

- Football League First Division: 1933–34, 1934–35
- FA Cup: 1935–36
- FA Charity Shield: 1933
