= Sidey =

Sidey is an English surname. Notable people with this surname include:

- Hugh Sidey (1927–2005), American journalist
- Jenni Sidey-Gibbons (born 1988), Canadian astronaut, engineer and academic
- Norman Sidey (1907–1969), English football player
- Rory Sidey (born 1986), Australian rugby union player
- Stuart Sidey (1908–2007), New Zealand politician
- Thomas Sidey (1863–1933), New Zealand politician

Also this name appears in Thranscarpathia region in Ukraine and Russia, each surname formed differently.

== See also ==
- Sidey, Manokwari Regency, Indonesia
