= History of Derby County F.C. =

The history of Derby County Football Club is described in detail in two separate articles:

- History of Derby County F.C. (1884–1967)
- History of Derby County F.C. (1967–present)
