= Frank Moss (footballer, born 1909) =

English footballer & manager (1909–1970)

Personal information
- Date of birth: 5 November 1909
- Place of birth: Leyland, England
- Date of death: 7 February 1970 (aged 60)
- Place of death: Preston, England
- Height: 1.76 m (5 ft 9 in)
- Position: Goalkeeper

Senior career*
Years	Team	Apps	(Gls)
1928–1929	Preston North End	24	(0)
1929–1931	Oldham Athletic	29	(0)
1931–1937	Arsenal	143	(1)
Total		196	(1)

International career
1934	England	5	(0)

Managerial career
- 1937–1940: Heart of Midlothian
- * Club domestic league appearances and goals

Frank Moss (5 November 1909 – 7 February 1970) was an English football player and manager.

A goalkeeper, Moss was born in Leyland, Lancashire, and first played for Preston North End, joining them in 1928. After a year and 24 games for Preston, he joined Oldham Athletic (as an understudy to England No. 1 Jack Hacking). He played 29 league games in one and a half seasons, before signing for Arsenal in November 1931 for £3,000.

Moss immediately took the first-team keeper's jersey from Charlie Preedy, and was a near ever-present for the Gunners for the next four seasons; he won a hat-trick of First Division titles (1932-33, 1933-34 and 1934-35) and played in the 1932 FA Cup Final, which Arsenal lost to Newcastle United after a controversial equaliser from Jack Allen, where the ball went behind the goal-line and out of play before being crossed back in for Allen to score. He also won the FA Charity Shield in 1933 and 1934.

Moss also played five times for England, making his debut on 14 April 1934 against Scotland at Wembley, keeping a clean sheet as England won 3–0. His final match for England was the "Battle of Highbury" match against World Champions Italy on 14 November 1935 at Highbury, in which seven Arsenal players started the match; England won 3–2.

Moss is also the only Arsenal goalkeeper to score in a first-class match. On 16 March 1935, in a First Division match against Everton, Moss dislocated his left shoulder; with no substitutes allowed in those days, Moss was forced to play the rest of the game on the left wing, and he scored Arsenal's first goal in a 2–0 win. That match also proved to be Moss's downfall, however. He found it hard to recover from the injury - he played five more matches in 1935-36 but the injury quickly recurred. He was finally advised to retire in the summer of 1937 at age 27. He played 161 matches for Arsenal in total.

After retiring as a player, Moss was appointed manager of Hearts, where he became both the club's youngest manager and the first to enjoy complete autonomy in matters of team selection. He led his side to a second-place league finish in his first season in charge, however with the outbreak of World War II in 1940 he resigned to return home, and left football altogether. He died in 1970 at the age of 60.

== Honours ==
Arsenal

- FA Cup runner-up: 1931–32

== See also ==
- List of goalscoring goalkeepers
