= Battle of Highbury =

1934 football match between England and Italy

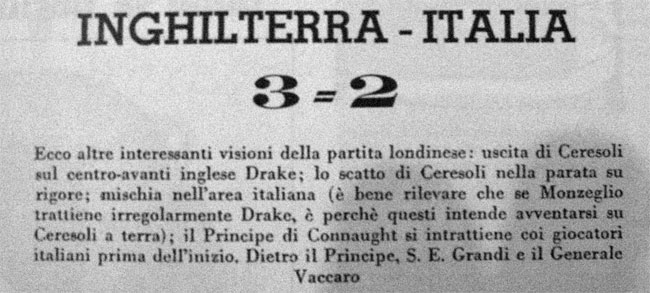
- Match report in Italian newspaper Il Calcio Illustrato
- Event: International friendly
England	Italy
(England)	(Italy)
3	2
- Date: 14 November 1934
- Venue: Highbury Stadium, London
- Referee: Otto Ohlsson (Sweden)
- Attendance: 56,044

The Battle of Highbury was a football match between England and Italy national teams that took place on 14 November 1934 at Highbury Stadium in Highbury, London. England won 3–2 in a hotly contested and frequently violent match.

== Background ==
This was Italy's first match since they had won the 1934 FIFA World Cup earlier that year, although England had not taken part as the Football Association had left FIFA in 1928. England were still considered one of the strongest teams in Europe at the time, and the match was billed in England at least as the "real" World Cup final.

The match set a record, in that it was the first and so far only time that seven players registered with the same club (namely Arsenal) started for England. Coincidentally, the match was played at Arsenal's home stadium, Highbury. In addition to the seven Arsenal players (Frank Moss, George Male, Eddie Hapgood, Wilf Copping, Ray Bowden, Ted Drake and Cliff Bastin), a young Stanley Matthews (Stoke City) won his second cap for the side; Cliff Britton (Everton), Jack Barker (Derby County) and Eric Brook (Manchester City) were the other three players. The England side was largely inexperienced, with every player having fewer than ten caps for his country.

== Match summary ==
=== First half ===
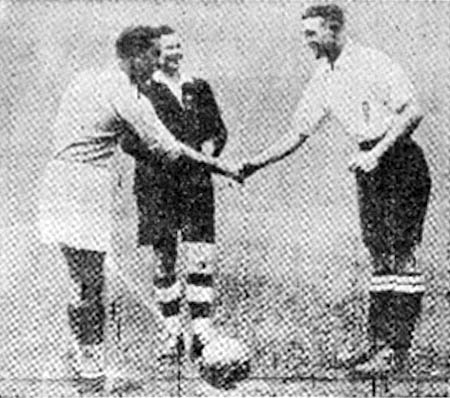
Both captains shake hands before the match

After only two minutes the Italian centre half Luis Monti had his foot broken in a rough tackle with Drake. Although Monti remained on the field for 15 minutes, he eventually had to leave the game leaving his team with ten men—at the time, no substitutes were allowed. Further, as Monti continued to play, other Italian players may not have been aware of the extent of his injury which is likely to have contributed to England's goals; England scored all its three goals in the first 12 minutes (at 2', 10', and 12'), while the Italians continued to play tactics where Monti was the last defender faced by the England attack. Eric Brook and Cliff Bastin caused the Italians an infinite amount of trouble by their passing and quick shooting.

Brook had missed a first-minute penalty after Drake was fouled by Carlo Ceresoli (who was able to save the goal with a prompt jump on the right). However he made amends by scoring twice, with a header (following a precise cross from Stanley Matthews) and a free kick, which Stanley Matthews described as being like a 'thunderbolt'. Drake added a third before half-time to make it 3–0. However, after realising the gravity of Monti's injury, the Italians adjusted their playing tactics so that England were unable to break through their defences.

The match was violent from the very start, with the visitors repeatedly retaliating against Drake's second-minute tackle: Eddie Hapgood had his nose broken (and had to be withdrawn for 15 minutes), while Bowden damaged his ankle, Drake was punched and Brook had his arm fractured.

=== Second half ===
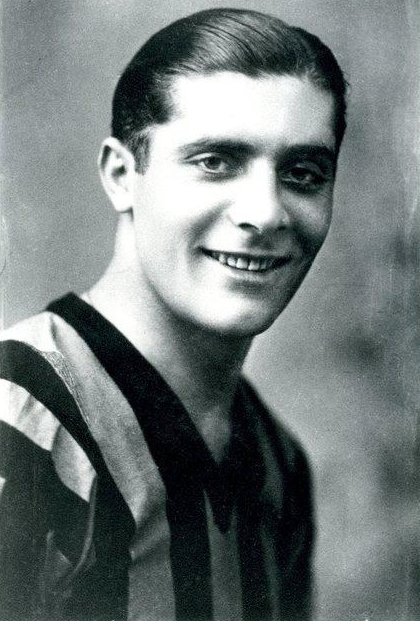
Giuseppe Meazza scored twice in the second half for Italy

However, Italy were not World Champions for nothing and after half time, despite the handicap of ten men, took the game to England. Giuseppe Meazza scored twice, and was only denied an equaliser by the woodwork and a series of saves from England's athletic goalkeeper, Frank Moss. Copping, England's "hardman", took the man of the match award with a strong fighting and tackling display in midfield.

The match settled nothing; although the English could claim a win and unofficial crown, the Italians claimed they had been handicapped for virtually the entire match by being a man down, and that England had scored only within the few minutes in which its strongest defender had been injured and not able to run. For this reason and despite the loss, in Italy the team players are still celebrated as "The Lions of Highbury". One thing that could not be contested was the violent nature of the match; the FA considered withdrawing from all internationals as a result, while Matthews would later recount that it was the most violent match of his long career.

England wore a white shirt and navy blue shorts. Italy wore traditional blue shirts and white shorts.

== Match details ==
14 November 1934

England	3–2	Italy
Brook 3', 10'; Drake 12'	Report	Meazza 58', 62'

Highbury Stadium, London
Attendance: 56,044
Referee: Otto Olsson (Sweden)

England	Italy

GK	Frank Moss
RB	George Male
LB	Eddie Hapgood (c)
RH	Cliff Britton
CH	Jack Barker
LH	Wilf Copping
OR	Stanley Matthews
IR	Ray Bowden
CF	Ted Drake
IL	Cliff Bastin
OL	Eric Brook

GK	Carlo Ceresoli
RB	Eraldo Monzeglio
LB	Luigi Allemandi
RH	Attilio Ferraris (c)
CH	Luis Monti
LH	Luigi Bertolini
OR	Enrique Guaita
IR	Pietro Serantoni
CF	Giuseppe Meazza
IL	Giovanni Ferrari
OL	Raimundo Orsi
Manager:
(Italy) Vittorio Pozzo
