= Les Fell =

English footballer

Personal information
- Full name: Leslie James Fell
- Date of birth: 16 December 1920
- Place of birth: Leyton, Essex, England
- Date of death: 9 October 2010 (aged 89)
- Place of death: Rochester, Kent, England
- Position: Winger

Senior career*
| Years | Team | Apps | (Gls) |
| 1945–1946 | Gravesend United | ? | (?) |
| 1946–1952 | Charlton Athletic | 13 | (2) |
| 1952–1954 | Crystal Palace | 65 | (6) |
| 1954–1955 | Margate | ? | (?) |
| Total | | 78 | (8) |
- * Club domestic league appearances and goals

Leslie James Fell (16 December 1920 – 9 October 2010) was an English footballer who played as a winger in the Football League.

He was known as 'Lightning Les' for his bursts of speed whilst playing for Charlton Athletic. The highlight of his football career was his appearance in the 1946 FA Cup final for Charlton where he played in the position of outside-right.

== Honours ==
Charlton Athletic

- FA Cup runner-up: 1945–46
