= Arthur Betts (cricketer) =

Australian cricketer

Personal information
- Born: 26 February 1880; Launceston, Tasmania, Australia
- Died: 4 August 1948 (aged 68); Belgrave, Victoria, Australia

Domestic team information
- Years: Team
- 1902-1903: Tasmania
- Source: Cricinfo, 17 January 2016

Arthur John Betts (26 February 1880 – 4 August 1948) was an Australian cricketer. He was a right-handed batsman and wicketkeeper who played for Tasmania. He was born in Launceston, Tasmania and died in Belgrave, Victoria.

Betts made a single first-class appearance for the team, during the 1902–03 season, against Victoria. He was dismissed for nought in each innings. Betts took three catches in each innings.

== See also ==
- List of Tasmanian representative cricketers
