= Norman Sidey =

English footballer

Personal information
- Full name: Norman William Sidey
- Date of birth: 31 May 1907
- Place of birth: Nunhead, England
- Date of death: 1969 (aged 61–62)
- Position: Defender

Senior career*
| Years | Team | Apps | (Gls) |
| 1928–1932 | Nunhead | | |
| 1932–1938 | Arsenal | 40 | (0) |
- * Club domestic league appearances and goals

Norman William Sidey (31 May 1907 – 1969) was an English footballer who played for Arsenal. He was part of the Arsenal sides that won the FA Charity Shield in 1933 and 1934.
