= Bert Turner (footballer, born 1909) =

Welsh footballer

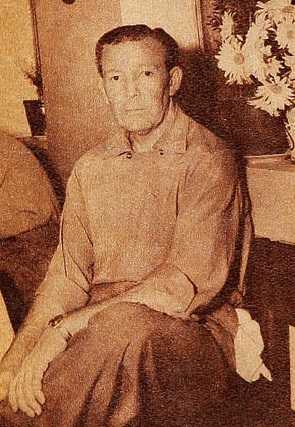

Personal information
- Full name: Herbert Gwyn Turner
- Date of birth: 19 June 1909
- Place of birth: Brithdir, Caerphilly, Wales
- Date of death: 8 June 1981 (aged 71)
- Place of death: Birchington-on-Sea, England
- Position: Full back

Senior career*
Years	Team	Apps	(Gls)
1933	Brithdir		
1933–1947	Charlton Athletic	179	(2)
1947–????	Dartford		

International career
1936–1939	Wales	8	(0)

Managerial career
- 1947–1949: Dartford
- 1950: Dordrecht
- 1951–1955: Malmö FF
- 1955–1956: Kalmar FF
- * Club domestic league appearances and goals

Herbert Gwyn Turner (19 June 1909 – 8 June 1981) was a Welsh international footballer who played as a full back for Charlton Athletic. He was best known for scoring for both sides in the 1946 FA Cup Final, becoming the first player to do so.

== Football career ==
Turner was born in Brithdir, Caerphilly and, after school, he joined the Welch Regiment where he had a reputation as an all-round sportsman winning medals for rugby, athletics and hockey with Army teams, as well as playing football. On leaving the army, he returned to his place of birth where he made four appearances for the village team before a trial with Charlton Athletic.

Turner signed in August 1933 and made his first team debut in the Football League Third Division South, with twenty appearances at centre half in the 1933–34 season as Charlton finished fifth in the table. In the next season, he started off at centre half, playing alongside Bill Dodgin and Frank Harris before the arrival of Don Welsh in February led to him being moved to right back. The team that manager Jimmy Seed had assembled went on to claim the Division title at the end of the season, and finished as runners-up in the Second Division in 1936, thus achieving back-to-back promotions.

In their first season in Division One, Charlton finished in the runners-up spot, missing the League title by only three points to champions Manchester City, with the meanest defence in the division conceding only 49 goals. Turner continued to play regularly for Charlton up to the outbreak of the Second World War, as Charlton consolidated their place in the top flight with fourth place and third-place finishes in the next two seasons.

By now, Turner's club form had brought him to the notice of the Welsh selectors and he made his international debut at Ninian Park on 17 October 1936 in a 2–1 victory over England. Wales followed this with victories over Scotland (2–1) and Ireland (4–1) to comfortably claim the 1937 British Home Championship. Turner made a total of eight appearances for Wales prior to the war, with five victories and three defeats. He continued to turn out regularly for Wales during the early part of the war, making a further eight appearances in wartime internationals.

During the war he was a guest-player for Lovell's Athletic, the works team for Lovell's sweet factory in Newport, Monmouthshire, Wales.

After the cessation of hostilities, there was no League football in 1945–46. The FA Cup was the main competition to be played this season; to make up for the lack of quality matches, all FA Cup rounds from round one up to and including the quarter-finals were made two-legged ties (rather than the traditional single matches) with the aggregate score determining who went through to the next round. After easy victories over Wolverhampton Wanderers, Preston North End and Brentford, Charlton met Bolton Wanderers in the semi-final. Bolton were still suffering from the after-effects of the Burnden Park disaster in which 33 spectators were killed as a result of overcrowding. Charlton won the semi-final comfortably to set up a Cup Final against Derby County.

The final was played at Wembley Stadium on 27 April 1946. The game was goalless until the 85th minute, when Jackie Stamps and a Charlton defender jumped up to head a centre from the right. As the ball was nodded out it went straight to Dally Duncan, who shot goalwards. Turner tried to kick the ball clear, but only managed to turn the ball into his own net. In the next minute Turner scored for his own side when he took a free-kick from the edge of the Rams' penalty area, and although goalkeeper Vic Woodley appeared to have the shot well covered, the ball struck a Derby player and was deflected past Woodley into the opposite corner of the net to which he was diving.

Turner thus became the first player to score for both sides in an FA Cup Final, a feat subsequently repeated by Tommy Hutchison in 1981 and Gary Mabbutt in 1987. At the age of 36 years 312 days, Turner also became the oldest player to score in an FA Cup Final. The match finished level after 90 minutes, but in extra time Derby County scored three goals to win the match 4–1.

Turner played one more season with Charlton, but was no longer a regular choice, and was used as cover for Peter Croker at right back or Herbert Johnson at right-half. Turner retired in 1947 after a 14-year Charlton career in which he played 196 matches. Apart from the cup-final goal, his only other goals were two penalties.

== Coaching career ==
He moved to Dartford as player-coach 1947 and 1950 he spent a year in the Netherlands coaching Dortrecht FC. He then left for Sweden where he coached Malmö FF and Kalmar FF.

== Later career ==
In 1956, he returned to England, where he became a licensee in Manston, Kent, until 1980.

== Family ==
His elder brother, Ernest was a forward with Merthyr Town and Southampton in the 1920s. Bert married Ena James 18 May 1937 and so became brother-in-law to Dai Astley (footballer) who was married to Ena's sister Muriel. In 1938 Ena gave birth to a daughter Jillian, who later lived in Sweden

== Honours ==
=== As a player ===
Charlton Athletic

- Football League Third Division South: 1934–35
- Football League Second Division runners-up: 1935–36
- FA Cup runner-up: 1945–46

Wales

- British Home Championship: 1937

=== As a manager ===
Malmö FF

- Allsvenskan: 1951, 1953
- Svenska Cupen: 1951, 1953
