= 1933 FA Charity Shield =

Everton	Arsenal
0	3
- Date: 18 October 1933
- Venue: Goodison Park, Liverpool
- Attendance: 20,000

The 1933 FA Charity Shield was the 20th FA Charity Shield, an annual football match. It was played between Everton (1932–33 FA Cup winners) and Arsenal (1932–33 Football League champions) at Goodison Park in Liverpool on 18 October 1933. Arsenal won the match 0–3.

== Match details ==
18 October 1933

Everton	0–3	Arsenal
		Birkett ?', ?'; Bowden

Goodison Park, Liverpool
Attendance: 40,000

Everton
Arsenal

GK	1	(England) Ted Sagar
DF	2	(Northern Ireland) Billy Cook
DF	3	(England) Bill Bocking
MF	4	(England) Cliff Britton
MF	5	(England) Charles Gee
MF	6	(Scotland) Jock Thomson
FW	7	(England) Albert Geldard
FW	8	(Scotland) James Dunn
FW	9	(England) Dixie Dean (c)
FW	10	(England) Tommy Johnson
FW	11	(Scotland) Jimmy Stein
Manager: (England) Thomas H. McIntosh

1	(England) Frank Moss
2	(England) George Male
3	(England) Eddie Hapgood
4	(Scotland) Frank Hill
5	(England) Norman Sidey
6	(Wales) Charlie Jones
7	(England) Ralph Birkett
8	(Scotland) Alex James (c)
9	(England) Ray Bowden
10	(Wales) Bob John
11	(England) Ernie Coleman
Manager: (England) Herbert Chapman
