= Jack Barker (English footballer) =

English footballer and manager

Personal information
- Full name: John William Barker
- Date of birth: 27 February 1906
- Place of birth: Denaby, England
- Date of death: 20 January 1982 (aged 75)
- Position: Defender

Youth career
- Denaby Rovers

Senior career*
Years	Team	Apps	(Gls)
- Denaby United
1928–1939	Derby County	327	(2)

International career
1934–1936	England	11	(0)

Managerial career
- 1946–1947: Bradford City
- 1947–48: Dundalk
- 1953–1955: Derby County
- * Club domestic league appearances and goals

John William Barker (27 February 1906 – 20 January 1982) was an English footballer who played 327 league games for Derby County and won 11 England caps. He later managed Derby County and Bradford City.

== Playing career ==
=== Derby County ===
Born in Denaby, near Conisbrough, England, Barker was a centre half who played youth football with Denaby Rovers in the Rawmarsh League while working full-time as a miner. His career nearly finished before it had barely started after he suffered a thigh injury at the pit following a roof collapse. He joined Midland League side Denaby United for one season, before he signed for Derby County for £200 in May 1928. He played in their great pre-war team under George Jobey when Derby were rarely outside the top six. Barker represented Derby in 327 league games but never won any silverware with the club.

=== England ===
However, his form earned Barker 11 caps for England. Barker won his first cap against Wales on 29 September 1934. His second game was the infamous Battle of Highbury in a hotly contested and violent match against Italy. Over the next two years he played nine more times both in friendlies and the British Home Championship. In his final game for England he was made captain against Wales on 17 October 1936.

== Managerial career ==
After retiring from Derby County, Barker joined the Army Physical Training Corps before being appointed Bradford City manager in May 1946 taking charge of the team's first season following World War Two. He was steering City to a high position in Division Three (North) when he resigned in January 1947 after just eight months in charge. His reign was the shortest in City's history at the time.

He had a brief spell in charge of Irish club, Dundalk before he returned to Derby to work for Rolls-Royce. He moved to be trainer-coach at Oldham Athletic in 1948.

In November 1953, he returned to football management at Derby County to replace Stuart McMillan. The club had lost its international players and in 1954–55 the side were relegated to Division Three (North) for the first time in its history.

== After football ==
Barker resigned to go back to work in Derby, as a fitter's mate at the Carriage and Wagon railway works in Derby.

Barker died in 1982 just before his 76th birthday following a fight against cancer and a spinal problem.
