= Arthur Betts (footballer, born 1917) =

English footballer (1917–1978)

Personal information
- Date of birth: 17 May 1917
- Place of birth: Sutton-in-Ashfield, England
- Date of death: 15 June 1978 (aged 61)
- Place of death: Sutton-in-Ashfield, England
- Position: Winger

Youth career
- Sutton Boys
- Hucknall Colts
- Sutton Junction F.C.
- Huthwaite CWS.

Senior career*
Years	Team	Apps	(Gls)
1936–1939 & 1944	Nottingham Forest	68	(10)
- * Club domestic league appearances and goals

Arthur Betts (17 May 1917 – 15 June 1978) was a professional Association Footballer who played for Nottingham Forest.

== Professional career ==
Betts was a winger (number 7 & 11) whose Football League career lasted from 1936 – 1939. His promising playing career was cut short due to injury (rupture to the internal lateral ligament of the right knee) in a match versus Coventry City. Betts was paid compensation by the league's insurers in 1941 having been told by doctors he would never play again, following major surgery to his injured knee. After convalescing, Betts regained fitness through a determined personal effort and expensive remedial physiotherapy. After an extraordinary recovery, regardless of medical opinion, Betts was asked to play again for Forest, having been spotted by an official excelling in the field at Cricket. Betts played in reserve team matches and one first team match, against Chesterfield F.C. in the 1944 war time Football League-North First Championship, over 5 years after his last first class match for Forest. Nevertheless, hopes of a long term comeback for Betts were dashed as league rules, which prevented a player from returning after receiving compensation, were imposed. Irrespective of his offer to repay his £350 compensation payment, the league's rules were upheld and Betts's professional career came to a premature end.

== Early career ==
Arthur Betts was born in Huthwaite, Sutton-in-Ashfield into a mining family. He excelled at sport at school and district level and at 14 was a member of the 1931 Sutton and District team that won the Cobbin Cup, beating Nottingham at Sutton Junction's ground. At 15 Betts had trials with Mansfield Town F.C. whilst with Hucknall Colts F.C. his first youth team. Betts was employed, after leaving school at 14, at New Hucknall Colliery in the lamp cabin. During the season 1934/35 Betts signed for Birmingham City F.C. as an amateur, and played "A" team matches for the club. Another club interested in Betts as an amateur was Sheffield United F.C. and he played an "A" team match against Bradford City F.C. "A" in 1935 whilst having changed employment, working for Co-operative Whole Sale (CWS) at Huthwaite in the hosiery industry. Betts also played for the CWS works team at this time. Like another exceptional local player of the time, Horace Burrows, Betts also turned out in junior football for Sutton Junction F.C. In 1936 Betts was offered a professional contract with Mansfield Town F.C. managed by Harold Wightman. Betts refused initially due to concern over leaving secure full-time employment. However, he committed to Wightman in September later that year when Wightman became the manager of Nottingham Forest. Betts signed professional terms in September 1936, making his debut against Bradford City on 28/12/36.

== Post injury career ==
Arthur Betts played cricket to a high level as an all-rounder for Huthwaite CWS, New Hucknall Colliery and Notts Club and Ground which was the nursery team of Nottinghamshire County Cricket Club. He played against Harold Larwood and Bill Voce in a benefit match for Larwood, the Notts and England Ashes winning bowler. Betts founded New Hucknall Colliery Boys' Club (Football, Cricket, Youth Club) with whom he served as treasurer, secretary, coach and trainer over a 23-year period. He was also Assistant Manager with Sutton Town F.C. Betts also managed the Notts F.A. youth team and worked on the Mansfield Youth Football League committee for many seasons. During the war years Betts was a member of the Home Guard. When his work as a knitter in hosiery with CWS (Cooperative Wholesale Limited) ended, Betts earned a living as a payroll officer and part-time groundsman, for New Hucknall Colliery, supporting his wife and family until his death in 1978.
