= Sammy Crooks =

English footballer (1908–1981)

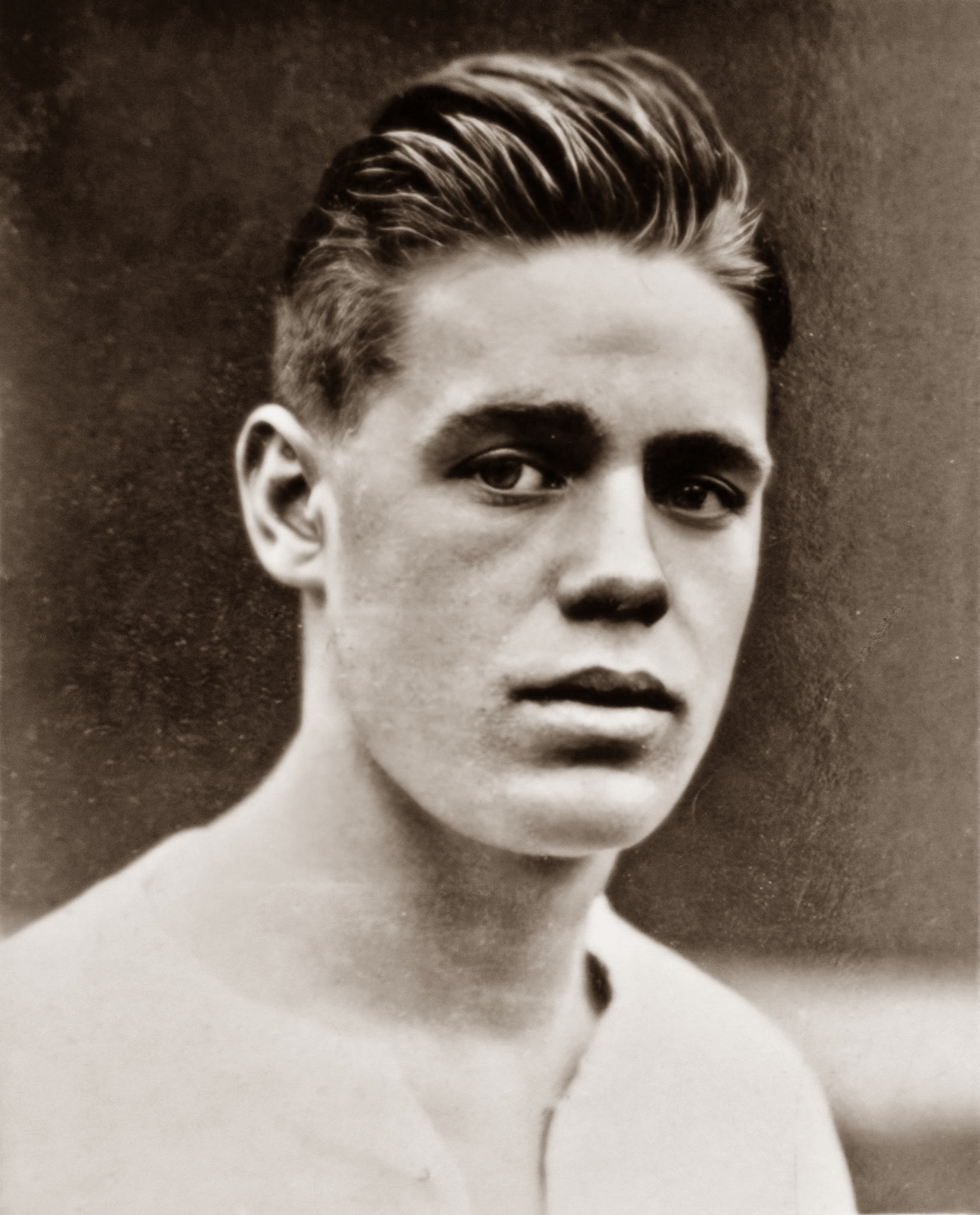
- Crooks around 1929

Personal information
- Full name: Samuel Dickinson Crooks
- Date of birth: 16 January 1908
- Place of birth: Bearpark, County Durham, England
- Date of death: 3 February 1981 (aged 73)
- Place of death: Belper, England
- Position: Outside right

Youth career
- Bearpark Colliery
- Brandon Juniors
- Tow Law Town

Senior career*
Years	Team	Apps	(Gls)
1926–1927	Durham City	16	(4)
1927–1946	Derby County	408	(101)
Total		424	(105)

International career
1930–1936	England	27	(7)

Managerial career
- 1949–1950: Retford Town
- 1950–1954: Shrewsbury Town
- 1954–1957: Gresley Rovers
- 1957: Burton Albion
- 1958–1959: Gresley Rovers
- 1959–1960: Heanor Town
- * Club domestic league appearances and goals

Samuel Dickinson Crooks (16 January 1908 – 3 February 1981) was an English footballer who played as outside forward or outside right for Derby County in the mid-war era. He was one of the best-known footballers of the 1920s and 1930s and was capped 26 times by England.

== Early life ==
Crooks was born at Bearpark, County Durham, one of a family of 17 children. After leaving school, he worked in the coal-mines and played for the colliery team and then for Tow Law Town in his spare time until problems with rheumatism forced him to abandon his career underground. When his health was restored he joined Durham City in June 1926 and made 16 appearances for them in the Third Division (North).

== Playing career ==
=== Club career ===
By April 1927, Crooks had been spotted by George Jobey and was signed for Derby County for a fee of £300, making his debut for The Rams in a 2–1 win over Leicester City on 10 September 1927. Between 1927 and 1946 he played 445 games for the Rams, scoring 111 goals. During this period, County were twice runners-up in the Football League, in 1930 and 1936.

In 1935, Arsenal attempted to sign Crooks and Tom Cooper in exchange for Alex James, but the deal fell through as Arsenal required a cash payment as well which Derby were not prepared to meet.

Crook's playing career was interrupted by World War II, but he made a handful of league appearances in the 1946–47 season before retiring.

He was unlucky to miss Derby's FA Cup win of 1946 due to a knee injury sustained in an earlier round against Aston Villa, having scored in all of the earlier rounds. Despite featuring in the practice match prior to the game, he was not considered fit enough to play in the final. Crooks believed that he was just a week away from being fit enough to have been able to feature, despite the possibility he may not have been risked in any scenario.

In total, he made 448 appearances for Derby, scoring 110 goals.

=== International career ===
His first appearance for England was in a 5–2 victory against Scotland on 5 April 1930. He then became a regular fixture in the England side with 15 consecutive appearances, making 27 total appearances and scoring 7 goals, including two in a 7–1 defeat of Spain on 9 December 1931. His final England appearance came in a 6–2 victory over Hungary on 2 December 1936, playing alongside Derby County colleagues Raich Carter and Eric Keen.

== Managerial career ==
In December 1949, Crooks accepted his first managerial position at Retford Town, several months after resigning as Derby County's chief scout. Following that resignation, Crooks had expressed that if he was unable to secure a managerial position in England, he would pursue opportunities in the United States. During his tenure at Retford, he occasionally played for the team, including a match in April when he featured as a winger against Ilkeston. Crooks left the club at the expiration of his contract in May 1950, having led them to win the Yorkshire League, with just one loss in 23 games.

In May 1950 he became manager of Shrewsbury Town, who had been elected to the Football League Division Three North for the 1950–51 season. He remained with the Shropshire side until 1954, leaving due to his wife wishing to return to Derby and also due to his own business interests.

In 1954 he moved to Gresley Rovers turning out occasionally as a player, making his début on Boxing Day 1954 in the Birmingham & District League at Burton Albion. There followed a spell as manager with Burton Albion from June 1957 until his sacking just six months later in November following a loss of confidence from the club's directors. He then returned to manage Gresley Rovers before becoming manager at Heanor Town. During this time he opened a sport clothing store in Derby.

After finishing in local team management he became Derby County's Chief Scout (until 1967) and also served for 14 years as Secretary of the Association Football Players Union.

His career has been marked by Durham City naming the upper lounge at New Ferens Park, 'The Sammy Crooks Lounge', which is home to some of the memorabilia from his playing career. Similarly, Belper Leisure Centre, situated in the town where he died, renamed the bar to 'The Sammy Crooks Suite'.

== Career statistics ==
Appearances and goals by club, season and competition
Club	Season	League			FA Cup		Total	
Club	Season	Division	Apps	Goals	Apps	Goals	Apps	Goals
Durham City	1926–27	Third Division North	16	4	-	-	16	4
Derby County	1927–28	First Division	34	10	3	0	37	10
Derby County	1928–29	First Division	29	6	2	0	31	6
Derby County	1929–30	First Division	34	10	3	0	37	10
Derby County	1930–31	First Division	37	15	1	0	38	15
Derby County	1931–32	First Division	37	11	3	0	40	11
Derby County	1932–33	First Division	28	5	6	2	34	7
Derby County	1933–34	First Division	37	7	4	1	41	8
Derby County	1934–35	First Division	36	10	3	2	39	12
Derby County	1935–36	First Division	29	4	4	1	33	5
Derby County	1936–37	First Division	34	9	1	0	35	9
Derby County	1937–38	First Division	37	7	1	0	38	7
Derby County	1938–39	First Division	33	7	1	0	34	7
Derby County	1945–46	—			5	3	5	3
Derby County	1946–47	First Division	3	0	—		3	0
Derby County	Total		408	101	37	9	445	110
Career total			424	105	36	9	460	114
