= 1945–46 FA Cup =

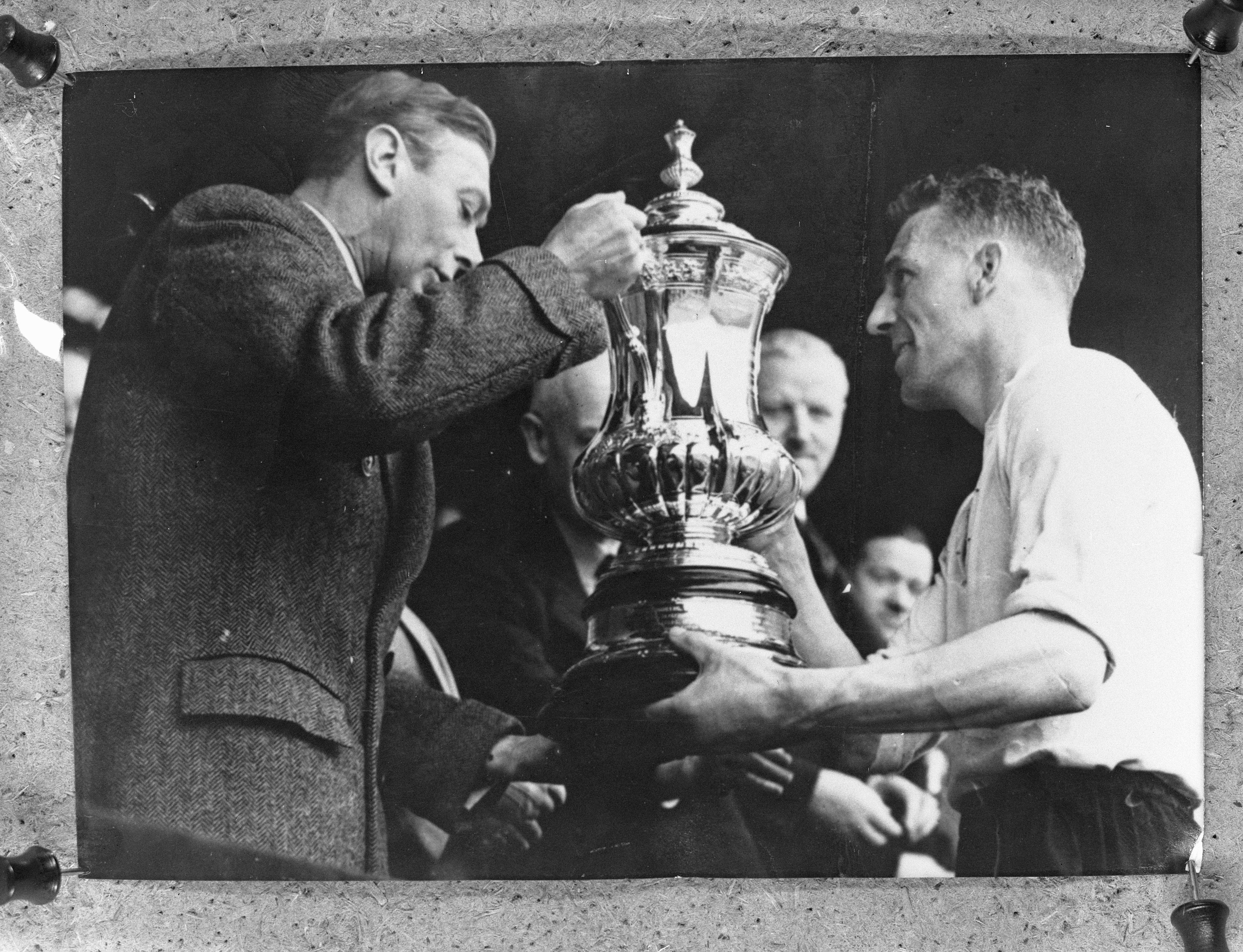
- The King presents the Cup to Derby captain Jack Nicholas after the final

Tournament details
- Country: England; Wales

Final positions
- Champions: Derby County (1st title)
- Runners-up: Charlton Athletic

The 1945–46 FA Cup was the 65th season of the world's oldest football cup competition, the Football Association Challenge Cup, generally known as the FA Cup, and the first to be held after the Second World War. Derby County were the winners, beating Charlton Athletic 4–1 after extra time in the final at Wembley, London. The tournament witnessed a disaster in the sixth round when, during the second leg of the Bolton–Stoke City tie, 33 people were crushed to death in the Burnden Park disaster.

For the only time in the history of the competition, all matches from the first round proper up to and including the sixth round proper were played over two legs, the first leg being played at the stadium of the team named first on the date specified for each round, which was always a Saturday. In the first and second rounds proper, the second leg was played on the following Saturday; from the third round onwards, it was played during the week following the first leg. If aggregate scores were level after 90 minutes of the second leg had been played, a replay would take place at a neutral venue. (Semi-finals and finals were played as single games at neutral venues; a drawn semi-final after 90 minutes was replayed, with a drawn semi-final going to extra time and possible subsequent replays; a drawn final went to extra time, and then subsequent replays if needed.) These changes were made in order to give clubs additional revenue, as the Football League would not resume normal play until the autumn of 1946.

== Calendar ==
Round	Date
Extra preliminary round	Saturday 1 September 1945
Preliminary round	Saturday 8 September 1945
First round qualifying	Saturday 22 September 1945
Second round qualifying	Saturday 6 October 1945
Third round qualifying	Saturday 20 October 1945
Fourth round qualifying	Saturday 3 November 1945
First round proper	Saturday 17 November 1945; Saturday 24 November 1945
Second round proper	Saturday 8 December 1945; Saturday 15 December 1945
Third round proper	Saturday 5 January 1946 w/c Monday 7 January 1946
Fourth round proper	Saturday 26 January 1946 w/c Monday 28 January 1946
Fifth round proper	Saturday 9 February 1946 w/c Monday 11 February 1946
Sixth round proper	Saturday 2 March 1946 w/c Monday 4 March 1946
Semi-finals	Saturday 23 March 1946
Final	Saturday 27 April 1946

w/c = week commencing

== Qualifying rounds ==
As with the 1919–20 tournament, participant numbers were down this season after many clubs from the lower echelons of the English football system did not resume after the Second World War. Local leagues across the UK were reeling after seven seasons of competitive hiatus, while other stronger clubs such as Burton Town were unable to survive the loss of regular income streams during wartime.

Most of the clubs from outside the Football League who did enter the tournament still competed in the qualifying rounds to secure one of 25 places available in the first round proper.

The 25 winners from the fourth qualifying round were Stockton, Willington, North Shields, Netherfield, Chorley, Marine, Stalybridge Celtic, Yorkshire Amateur, Shrewsbury Town, Gainsborough Trinity, Wellington Town, Kettering Town, Grantham, Wisbech Town, Chelmsford City, Romford, Barnet, Slough United, Walthamstow Avenue, Sutton United, Bromley, Trowbridge Town, Newport (IOW), Cheltenham Town and Lovell's Athletic.

Advancing to the competition proper for the first time were Willington, Netherfield, Wisbech Town, Slough United, Sutton United, Trowbridge Town and Lovell's Athletic, while Shrewsbury Town had not done so since 1909–10. Slough United's appearance in the first round was also the first by a team from that town since Swifts had been knocked out by The Wednesday in 1889-90.

This season's extra preliminary round contained only eight teams (four from Oxfordshire and two each from Buckinghamshire and Middlesex). None of those progressed past the second qualifying round. Barnet, Slough United and Sutton United were the only clubs to progress to the first round proper from the preliminary round.

== Results ==
=== First round proper ===
At this stage 38 Third Division North and Third Division South clubs, and Newport County from the Second Division, joined the 25 non-league clubs who had advanced from the qualifying rounds. Chester, Cardiff City, Crystal Palace and Norwich City received byes to the third round while Hull City and New Brighton did not enter the competition. To make the number of matches up, non-league sides Bath City, Yeovil Town, Bishop Auckland and South Liverpool received byes to this stage, with Bishop Auckland being the champions from the 1938-39 FA Amateur Cup.

The first leg matches were played on Saturday, 17 November 1945 and the second legs on the following Saturday, 24 November 1945. No replays were necessary.

Tie no	Team drawn first	Score	Team drawn second	Attendance	Notes
1	Darlington	2–0	Stockton		
1	Stockton	1–4	Darlington		
1	Darlington	6–1	Stockton		
2	Barnet	2–6	Queens Park Rangers		
2	Queens Park Rangers	2–1	Barnet		
2	Barnet	3–8	Queens Park Rangers		
3	Barrow	1–0	Netherfield		
3	Netherfield	2–2	Barrow		
3	Barrow	3–2	Netherfield		
4	Bath City	3–2	Cheltenham Town		
4	Cheltenham Town	0–2	Bath City		
4	Bath City	5–2	Cheltenham Town		
5	Sutton United	1–4	Walthamstow Avenue		
5	Walthamstow Avenue	7–2	Sutton United		
5	Sutton United	3–11	Walthamstow Avenue		
6	Watford	1–1	Southend United		
6	Southend United	0–3	Watford		
6	Watford	4–1	Southend United		
7	Marine	4–0	Stalybridge Celtic		
7	Stalybridge Celtic	3–3	Marine		
7	Marine	7–3	Stalybridge Celtic		
8	Reading	3–0	Aldershot		
8	Aldershot	7–3	Reading		
8	Reading	6–7	Aldershot		
9	Wisbech Town	0–3	Ipswich Town	4,356	
9	Ipswich Town	5–0	Wisbech Town	9,598	
9	Wisbech Town	0–8	Ipswich Town		
10	Notts County	2–2	Bradford City		
10	Bradford City	1–2	Notts County		
10	Notts County	4–3	Bradford City		
11	Crewe Alexandra	4–2	Wrexham		
11	Wrexham	3–0	Crewe Alexandra		
11	Crewe Alexandra	4–5	Wrexham		
12	Swindon Town	1–0	Bristol Rovers		
12	Bristol Rovers	4–1	Swindon Town		
12	Swindon Town	2–4	Bristol Rovers		
13	Shrewsbury Town	5–0	Walsall		
13	Walsall	4–1	Shrewsbury Town		
13	Shrewsbury Town	6–4	Walsall		
14	Doncaster Rovers	0–1	Rotherham United		
14	Rotherham United	2–1	Doncaster Rovers		
14	Doncaster Rovers	1–3	Rotherham United		
15	Stockport County	1–2	Rochdale		
15	Rochdale	1–1	Stockport County		
15	Stockport County	2–3	Rochdale		
16	Chorley	2–1	Accrington Stanley		
16	Accrington Stanley	2–0	Chorley		
16	Chorley	2–3	Accrington Stanley		
17	Trowbridge Town	1–3	Exeter City		
17	Exeter City	7–2	Trowbridge Town		
17	Trowbridge Town	3–10	Exeter City		
18	Northampton Town	5–1	Chelmsford City		
18	Chelmsford City	0–5	Northampton Town		
18	Northampton Town	10–1	Chelmsford City		
19	Bromley	6–1	Slough United		
19	Slough United	1–0	Bromley		
19	Bromley	6–2	Slough United		
20	South Liverpool	1–1	Tranmere Rovers		
20	Tranmere Rovers	6–1	South Liverpool		
20	South Liverpool	2–7	Tranmere Rovers		
21	Brighton & Hove Albion	3–1	Romford		
21	Romford	1–1	Brighton & Hove Albion		
21	Brighton & Hove Albion	4–2	Romford		
22	Carlisle United	5–1	North Shields		
22	North Shields	2–3	Carlisle United		
22	Carlisle United	8–3	North Shields		
23	Mansfield Town	3–0	Gainsborough Trinity		
23	Gainsborough Trinity	4–2	Mansfield Town		
23	Mansfield Town	5–4	Gainsborough Trinity		
24	Willington	0–5	Bishop Auckland		
24	Bishop Auckland	0–2	Willington		
24	Willington	2–5	Bishop Auckland		
25	Port Vale	4–0	Wellington Town		
25	Wellington Town	0–2	Port Vale		
25	Port Vale	6–0	Wellington Town		
26	Halifax Town	1–0	York City		
26	York City	4–2	Halifax Town		
26	Halifax Town	3–4	York City		
27	Southport	1–2	Oldham Athletic		
27	Oldham Athletic	3–1	Southport		
27	Southport	2–5	Oldham Athletic		
28	Yeovil Town	2–2	Bristol City		
28	Bristol City	3–0	Yeovil Town		
28	Yeovil Town	2–5	Bristol City		
29	Torquay United	0–1	Newport County	4,000	
29	Newport County	1–1	Torquay United	7,178	
29	Torquay United	1–2	Newport County		
30	Lovells Athletic	4–1	Bournemouth & Boscombe Athletic		
30	Bournemouth & Boscombe Athletic	3–2	Lovells Athletic		
30	Lovells Athletic	6–4	Bournemouth & Boscombe Athletic		
31	Yorkshire Amateur	1–0	Lincoln City		
31	Lincoln City	5–1	Yorkshire Amateur		
31	Yorkshire Amateur	2–5	Lincoln City		
32	Kettering Town	1–5	Grantham		
32	Grantham	2–2	Kettering Town		
32	Kettering Town	3–7	Grantham		
33	Gateshead	6–2	Hartlepools United		
33	Hartlepools United	1–2	Gateshead		
33	Gateshead	8–3	Hartlepools United		
34	Leyton Orient	2–1	Newport (IoW)		
34	Newport (IoW)	2–0	Leyton Orient		
34	Leyton Orient	2–3	Newport (IoW)		

=== Second round proper ===
The first leg matches were played on Saturday, 8 December 1945 and the second legs on the following Saturday, 15 December 1945. No replays were necessary.

Tie no	Home team	Score	Away team	Attendance	Notes
1	Barrow	4–2	Carlisle United		
1	Carlisle United	3–4	Barrow		
1	Barrow	8–5	Carlisle United		
2	Bristol City	4–2	Bristol Rovers		
2	Bristol Rovers	0–2	Bristol City		
2	Bristol City	6–2	Bristol Rovers		
3	Grantham	1–2	Mansfield Town		
3	Mansfield Town	2–1	Grantham		
3	Grantham	2–4	Mansfield Town		
4	Shrewsbury Town	0–1	Wrexham		
4	Wrexham	1–1	Shrewsbury Town		
4	Shrewsbury Town	1–2	Wrexham		
5	Bishop Auckland	1–2	York City		
5	York City	3–0	Bishop Auckland		
5	Bishop Auckland	1–5	York City		
6	Tranmere Rovers	3–1	Rochdale		
6	Rochdale	3–0	Tranmere Rovers		
6	Tranmere Rovers	3–4	Rochdale		
7	Queens Park Rangers	4–0	Ipswich Town		
7	Ipswich Town	0–2	Queens Park Rangers	10,571	
7	Queens Park Rangers	6–0	Ipswich Town		
8	Northampton Town	3–1	Notts County		
8	Notts County	3–2	Northampton Town		
8	Northampton Town	5–4	Notts County		
9	Bromley	1–3	Watford		
9	Watford	1–1	Bromley		
9	Bromley	2–4	Watford		
10	Oldham Athletic	2–1	Accrington Stanley		
10	Accrington Stanley	3–1	Oldham Athletic		
10	Oldham Athletic	3–4	Accrington Stanley		
11	Port Vale	3–1	Marine		
11	Marine	1–1	Port Vale		
11	Port Vale	4–2	Marine		
12	Newport County	5–1	Exeter City	5,606	
12	Exeter City	1–3	Newport County	9,000	
12	Newport County	8–2	Exeter City		
13	Lovells Athletic	2–1	Bath City		
13	Bath City	2–5	Lovells Athletic		
13	Lovells Athletic	7–3	Bath City		
14	Walthamstow Avenue	1–1	Brighton & Hove Albion		
14	Brighton & Hove Albion	4–2	Walthamstow Avenue		
14	Walthamstow Avenue	3–5	Brighton & Hove Albion		
15	Rotherham United	2–1	Lincoln City		
15	Lincoln City	1–1	Rotherham United		
15	Rotherham United	3–2	Lincoln City		
16	Aldershot	7–0	Newport (IoW)		
16	Newport (IoW)	0–5	Aldershot		
16	Aldershot	12–0	Newport (IoW)		
17	Gateshead	1–2	Darlington		
17	Darlington	2–4	Gateshead		
17	Gateshead	5–4	Darlington		

=== Third round proper ===
At this stage 43 Football League First and Second Division clubs entered the competition along with Chester, Cardiff City, Crystal Palace and Norwich City.

The first leg matches were played on Saturday, 5 January 1946 and the second legs in the following week commencing Monday, 7 January 1946. Two replays were necessary, both of which were played on Wednesday, 16 January 1946. Lovell's Athletic was the last non-league club left in the competition.

Tie no	Home team	Score	Away team	Date	Attendance	Notes
1	Chester	0–2	Liverpool	5 January 1946		
1	Liverpool	2–1	Chester	9 January 1946		
1	Chester	1–4	Liverpool			
2	Chesterfield	1–1	York City	5 January 1946		
2	York City	3–2	Chesterfield	9 January 1946		
2	Chesterfield	3–4	York City			
3	Bristol City	5–1	Swansea Town	5 January 1946		
3	Swansea Town	2–2	Bristol City	10 January 1946		
3	Bristol City	7–3	Swansea Town			
4	Bury	3–3	Rochdale	5 January 1946		
4	Rochdale	2–4	Bury	8 January 1946		
4	Bury	7–5	Rochdale			
5	Preston North End	2–1	Everton	5 January 1946		
5	Everton	2–2	Preston North End	9 January 1946		
5	Preston North End	4–3	Everton			
6	Southampton	4–3	Newport County	5 January 1946	22,000	
6	Newport County	1–2	Southampton	9 January 1946	8,509	
6	Southampton	6–4	Newport County			
7	Nottingham Forest	1–1	Watford	5 January 1946		
7	Watford	1–1	Nottingham Forest	9 January 1946		
7	Nottingham Forest	2–2	Watford			
Replay	Nottingham Forest	0–1	Watford	16 January 1946		
8	Bolton Wanderers	1–0	Blackburn Rovers	5 January 1946		
8	Blackburn Rovers	1–3	Bolton Wanderers	9 January 1946		
8	Bolton Wanderers	4–1	Blackburn Rovers			
9	Grimsby Town	1–3	Sunderland	5 January 1946		
9	Sunderland	2–1	Grimsby Town	9 January 1946		
9	Grimsby Town	2–5	Sunderland			
10	Luton Town	0–6	Derby County	5 January 1946	16,792	Report
10	Derby County	3–0	Luton Town	9 January 1946	16,629	Report
10	Luton Town	0–9	Derby County			
11	Wrexham	1–4	Blackpool	5 January 1946		
11	Blackpool	4–1	Wrexham	9 January 1946		
11	Wrexham	2–8	Blackpool			
12	Newcastle United	4–2	Barnsley	5 January 1946		
12	Barnsley	3–0	Newcastle United	9 January 1946		
12	Newcastle United	4–5	Barnsley			
13	Tottenham Hotspur	2–2	Brentford	5 January 1946		
13	Brentford	2–0	Tottenham Hotspur	10 January 1946		
13	Tottenham Hotspur	2–4	Brentford			
14	Manchester City	6–2	Barrow	5 January 1946		
14	Barrow	2–2	Manchester City	10 January 1946		
14	Manchester City	8–4	Barrow			
15	Queens Park Rangers	0–0	Crystal Palace	5 January 1946		
15	Crystal Palace	0–0	Queens Park Rangers	9 January 1946		
15	Queens Park Rangers	0–0	Crystal Palace			
Replay	Queens Park Rangers	1–0	Crystal Palace	16 January 1946		
16	Accrington Stanley	2–2	Manchester United	5 January 1946		
16	Manchester United	5–1	Accrington Stanley	9 January 1946		
16	Accrington Stanley	3–7	Manchester United			
17	Northampton Town	2–2	Millwall	5 January 1946		
17	Millwall	3–0	Northampton Town	7 January 1946		
17	Northampton Town	2–5	Millwall			
18	Coventry City	2–1	Aston Villa	5 January 1946		
18	Aston Villa	2–0	Coventry City	8 January 1946		
18	Coventry City	2–3	Aston Villa			
19	West Ham United	6–0	Arsenal	5 January 1946	35,000	
19	Arsenal	1–0	West Ham United	9 January 1946	22,000	
19	West Ham United	6–1	Arsenal			
20	Norwich City	1–2	Brighton & Hove Albion	5 January 1946		
20	Brighton & Hove Albion	4–1	Norwich City	9 January 1946		
20	Norwich City	2–6	Brighton & Hove Albion			
21	Chelsea	1–1	Leicester City	5 January 1946		
21	Leicester City	0–2	Chelsea	10 January 1946		
21	Chelsea	3–1	Leicester City			
22	Bradford Park Avenue	2–1	Port Vale	5 January 1946		
22	Port Vale	1–1	Bradford Park Avenue	7 January 1946		
22	Bradford Park Avenue	3–2	Port Vale			
23	Huddersfield Town	1–1	Sheffield United	5 January 1946		
23	Sheffield United	2–0	Huddersfield Town	7 January 1946		
23	Huddersfield Town	1–3	Sheffield United			
24	Mansfield Town	0–0	Sheffield Wednesday	5 January 1946		
24	Sheffield Wednesday	5–0	Mansfield Town	10 January 1946		
24	Mansfield Town	0–5	Sheffield Wednesday			
25	Cardiff City	1–1	West Bromwich Albion	5 January 1946		
25	West Bromwich Albion	4–0	Cardiff City	9 January 1946		
25	Cardiff City	1–5	West Bromwich Albion			
26	Charlton Athletic	3–1	Fulham	5 January 1946		
26	Fulham	2–1	Charlton Athletic	7 January 1946		
26	Charlton Athletic	4–3	Fulham			
27	Leeds United	4–4	Middlesbrough	5 January 1946		
27	Middlesbrough	7–2	Leeds United	9 January 1946		
27	Leeds United	6–11	Middlesbrough			
28	Lovells Athletic	2–4	Wolverhampton Wanderers	5 January 1946		
28	Wolverhampton Wanderers	8–1	Lovells Athletic	9 January 1946		
28	Lovells Athletic	3–12	Wolverhampton Wanderers			
29	Stoke City	3–1	Burnley	5 January 1946		
29	Burnley	2–1	Stoke City	7 January 1946		
29	Stoke City	4–3	Burnley			
30	Rotherham United	2–2	Gateshead	5 January 1946		
30	Gateshead	0–2	Rotherham United	9 January 1946		
30	Rotherham United	4–2	Gateshead			
31	Aldershot	2–0	Plymouth Argyle	5 January 1946		
31	Plymouth Argyle	0–1	Aldershot	9 January 1946		
31	Aldershot	3–0	Plymouth Argyle			
32	Birmingham City	1–0	Portsmouth	5 January 1946		
32	Portsmouth	0–0	Birmingham City	9 January 1946		
32	Birmingham City	1–0	Portsmouth			

=== Fourth round proper ===
The first leg matches were played on Saturday, 26 January 1946 and the second legs in the following week commencing Monday, 28 January 1946. One replay was necessary, which was played on 4 February 1946.

Tie no	Home team	Score	Away team	Date	Attendance	Notes
1	Blackpool	3–2	Middlesbrough	26 January 1946		
1	Middlesbrough	3–2	Blackpool	30 January 1946		
1	Blackpool	5–5	Middlesbrough			
Replay	Blackpool	0–1	Middlesbrough	4 February 1946		
2	Bristol City	2–1	Brentford	26 January 1946		
2	Brentford	5–0	Bristol City	31 January 1946		
2	Bristol City	2–6	Brentford			
3	Southampton	0–1	Queens Park Rangers	26 January 1946		
3	Queens Park Rangers	4–3	Southampton	30 January 1946		
3	Southampton	3–5	Queens Park Rangers			
4	Sheffield Wednesday	5–1	York City	26 January 1946		
4	York City	1–6	Sheffield Wednesday	30 January 1946		
4	Sheffield Wednesday	11–2	York City			
5	Bolton Wanderers	5–0	Liverpool	26 January 1946		
5	Liverpool	2–0	Bolton Wanderers	30 January 1946		
5	Bolton Wanderers	5–2	Liverpool			
6	Sunderland	3–1	Bury	26 January 1946		
6	Bury	5–4	Sunderland	29 January 1946		
6	Sunderland	7–6	Bury			
7	Derby County	1–0	West Bromwich Albion	26 January 1946	31,795	Report
7	West Bromwich Albion	1–3	Derby County	30 January 1946	37,734	Report
7	Derby County	4–1	West Bromwich Albion			
8	Barnsley	3–0	Rotherham United	26 January 1946		
8	Rotherham United	2–1	Barnsley	31 January 1946		
8	Barnsley	4–2	Rotherham United			
9	Brighton & Hove Albion	3–0	Aldershot	26 January 1946		
9	Aldershot	1–4	Brighton & Hove Albion	30 January 1946		
9	Brighton & Hove Albion	7–1	Aldershot			
10	Manchester United	1–0	Preston North End	26 January 1946		
10	Preston North End	3–1	Manchester United	30 January 1946		
10	Manchester United	2–3	Preston North End			
11	Millwall	2–4	Aston Villa	26 January 1946		
11	Aston Villa	9–1	Millwall	28 January 1946		
11	Millwall	3–13	Aston Villa			
12	Chelsea	2–0	West Ham United	26 January 1946	65,726	
12	West Ham United	1–0	Chelsea	30 January 1946	35,000	
12	Chelsea	2–1	West Ham United			
13	Bradford Park Avenue	1–3	Manchester City	26 January 1946		
13	Manchester City	2–8	Bradford Park Avenue	30 January 1946		
13	Bradford Park Avenue	9–5	Manchester City			
14	Charlton Athletic	5–2	Wolverhampton Wanderers	26 January 1946		
14	Wolverhampton Wanderers	1–1	Charlton Athletic	30 January 1946		
14	Charlton Athletic	6–3	Wolverhampton Wanderers			
15	Stoke City	2–0	Sheffield United	26 January 1946		
15	Sheffield United	3–2	Stoke City	28 January 1946		
15	Stoke City	4–3	Sheffield United			
16	Birmingham City	5–0	Watford	26 January 1946		
16	Watford	1–1	Birmingham City	30 January 1946		
16	Birmingham City	6–1	Watford			

=== Fifth round proper ===
The first leg matches were played on Saturday, 9 February 1946 and the second legs in the following week commencing Monday, 11 February 1946.

Tie no	Home team	Score	Away team	Date	Attendance	Notes
1	Preston North End	1–1	Charlton Athletic	9 February 1946		
1	Charlton Athletic	6–0	Preston North End	14 February 1946		
1	Preston North End	1–7	Charlton Athletic			
2	Bolton Wanderers	1–0	Middlesbrough	9 February 1946		
2	Middlesbrough	1–1	Bolton Wanderers	13 February 1946		
2	Bolton Wanderers	2–1	Middlesbrough			
3	Sunderland	1–0	Birmingham City	9 February 1946		
3	Birmingham City	3–1	Sunderland	13 February 1946		
3	Sunderland	2–3	Birmingham City			
4	Queens Park Rangers	1–3	Brentford	9 February 1946		
4	Brentford	0–0	Queens Park Rangers	14 February 1946		
4	Queens Park Rangers	1–3	Brentford			
5	Barnsley	0–1	Bradford Park Avenue	9 February 1946		
5	Bradford Park Avenue	1–1	Barnsley	13 February 1946		
5	Barnsley	1–2	Bradford Park Avenue			
6	Brighton & Hove Albion	1–4	Derby County	9 February 1946	22,000	Report
6	Derby County	6–0	Brighton & Hove Albion	14 February 1946	32,000	Report
6	Brighton & Hove Albion	1–10	Derby County			
7	Chelsea	0–1	Aston Villa	9 February 1946		
7	Aston Villa	1–0	Chelsea	12 February 1946		
7	Chelsea	0–2	Aston Villa			
8	Stoke City	2–0	Sheffield Wednesday	9 February 1946		
8	Sheffield Wednesday	0–0	Stoke City	11 February 1946		
8	Stoke City	2–0	Sheffield Wednesday			

=== Sixth round proper ===
2 March 1946	Aston Villa	3 – 4	Derby County	Villa Park, Birmingham
	Edwards 6'; Iverson 28'; Broome 66'	Report	Doherty 23' 85'; Carter 62'; Crooks 88'	Attendance: 76,500; Referee: W. E. Ross-Gower (London)

9 March 1946	Derby County	1 – 1	Aston Villa	Baseball Ground, Derby
	Carter 44'	Report	Broome	Attendance: 32,000; Referee: W. E. Ross-Gower (London)

Derby County win 5 – 4 on aggregate.

2 March 1946	Bradford Park Avenue	2 – 2	Birmingham City	Park Avenue, Bradford
			Dougall; Jones	Attendance: 19,732

9 March 1946	Birmingham City	6 – 0	Bradford Park Avenue	St Andrew's, Birmingham
	Dougall; Bodle; Mulraney			Attendance: 49,858

Birmingham City win 8 – 2 on aggregate.

2 March 1946	Charlton Athletic	6 – 3	Brentford	The Valley, London

6 March 1946	Brentford	1 – 3	Charlton Athletic	Griffin Park, London

Charlton Athletic win 9 – 4 on aggregate.

2 March 1946	Stoke City	0 – 2	Bolton Wanderers	Victoria Ground, Stoke-on-Trent

9 March 1946	Bolton Wanderers	0 – 0	Stoke City	Burnden Park, Bolton
				Attendance: A

Bolton Wanderers win 2 – 0 on aggregate.

=== Semi-finals ===
23 March 1946

Derby County	1 – 1	Birmingham City
Carter 4'	Report	Mulraney 59'

Hillsborough, Sheffield
Attendance: 65,013
Referee: W. H. E. Evans (Liverpool)
23 March 1946

Charlton Athletic	2 – 0	Bolton Wanderers
Duffy 36', 51'

Villa Park, Birmingham

==== Replay ====
27 March 1946

Birmingham City	0 – 4 (a.e.t.)	Derby County
	Report	Doherty 96', 112'; Stamps 103', 118'

Maine Road, Manchester
Attendance: 80,407

=== Final ===
The final took place on Saturday, 27 April 1946 at Wembley and ended in a 4–1 win for Derby County after extra time. Charlton Athletic's Bert Turner opened the scoring with an own goal in the 85th minute, which he equalised a minute later to force extra time. A goal from Peter Doherty and two from Jack Stamps completed Derby's victory.

27 April 1946
15:00 BST

Derby County	4–1 (a.e.t.)	Charlton Athletic
B. Turner 85' (o.g.); Doherty 92'; Stamps 97', 106'	Report	B. Turner 86'

Wembley, London
Attendance: 98,000
Referee: Eddie Smith

Derby County	Charlton Athletic
