= 1946 FA Cup final =

1946 FA Cup Final
- Event: 1945–46 FA Cup
Derby County	Charlton Athletic
4	1
- After extra time
- Date: 27 April 1946
- Venue: Wembley Stadium, London
- Referee: Eddie Smith (Cumberland)
- Attendance: 98,000

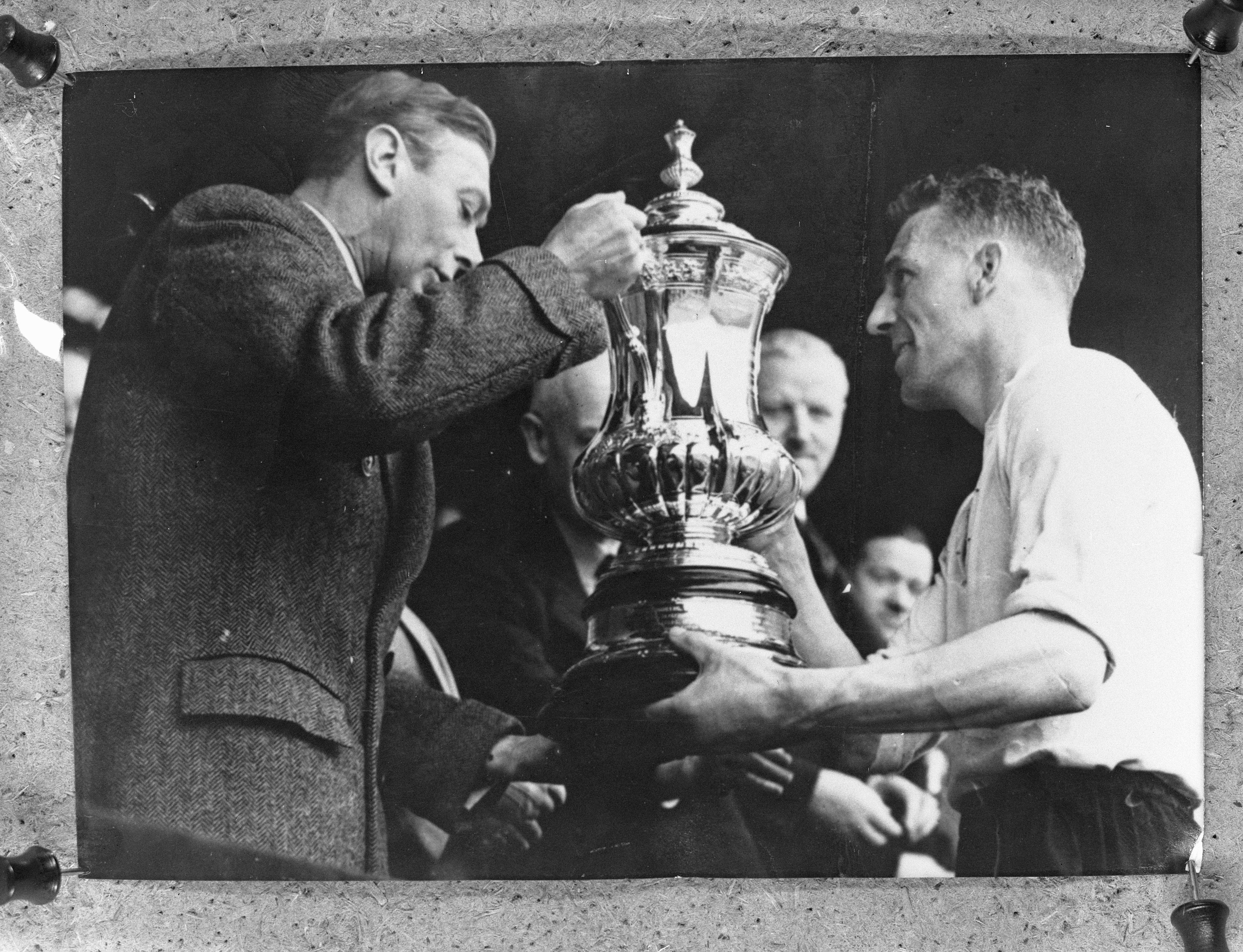
King George VI presents the Cup to Derby captain Jack Nicholas

The 1946 FA Cup final was the 65th final of the FA Cup, and the first after World War II. It took place on 27 April 1946 at Wembley Stadium and was contested between Derby County and Charlton Athletic.

Derby won the match 4–1 after extra time. Charlton's Bert Turner scored an own goal and then scored for his own team, thus becoming the first player to score for both sides in an FA Cup Final. Goals from Peter Doherty and Jackie Stamps (2) in the extra-time period gave Derby their first, and so far only, FA Cup triumph.

== Background ==
The game was the first FA Cup final to be played in seven years, due to World War II. Among the spectators were The King and The Queen. Demand for tickets was reported as being unprecedented, with ticket sales reaching around £45,000. Each team included both youthful and experienced players.

== Match summary ==
The game was goalless until the 85th minute, when a cross from the right was punched out by goalkeeper Sam Bartram, but it went straight to Dally Duncan who shot goalwards; Bert Turner tried to kick the ball clear, but only managed to deflect the ball into his own net. In the next minute, Turner scored for his own side when he took a free-kick from the edge of the Rams’ penalty area and, although goalkeeper Vic Woodley appeared to have the shot well covered, the ball struck a Derby player and was deflected past Woodley into the opposite corner of the net to which he was diving.

Turner thus became the first player to score for both sides in an FA Cup Final, subsequently repeated by Tommy Hutchison in 1981 and Gary Mabbutt in 1987. At the age of 36 years 312 days, Turner also became the oldest player to score in an FA Cup Final.

The match finished level after 90 minutes, but, in extra time, Derby County scored three goals to win the match 4–1.

When Stamps shot for goal in the closing minutes of normal time, the ball burst en route. Stamps went on to score twice with the new ball as Derby beat Charlton Athletic 4–1.

The players in the 1946 Cup final were awarded two medals each. Due to a shortage of gold following the Second World War, the two teams were initially presented with bronze medals (winners and runners-up) on the day, and subsequently awarded the proper gold versions when gold became more readily available later that year.

The last surviving player from the game, Derby's Reg Harrison, died on 17 September 2020.

== Match details ==
27 April 1946
15:00 BST

Derby County	4–1 (a.e.t.)	Charlton Athletic
B. Turner 85' (o.g.); Doherty 92'; Stamps 97', 106'	(Report)	B. Turner 86'

Wembley Stadium, London
Attendance: 98,000
Referee: Eddie Smith (Cumberland)

Derby County	Charlton Athletic

GK	1	(England) Vic Woodley
RB	2	(England) Jack Nicholas (c)
LB	3	(England) Jack Howe
RH	4	(Scotland) Jim Bullions
CH	5	(England) Leon Leuty
LH	6	(England) Chick Musson
OR	7	(England) Reg Harrison
IR	8	(England) Raich Carter
CF	9	(England) Jackie Stamps
IL	10	(Northern Ireland) Peter Doherty
OL	11	(Scotland) Dally Duncan
Manager:
(England) Stuart McMillan

GK	1	(England) Sam Bartram
RB	2	(England) Harold Phipps
LB	3	(England) Jack Shreeve
RH	4	(Wales) Bert Turner
CH	5	(England) Jack Oakes
LH	6	(England) Bert Johnson
OR	7	(England) Les Fell
IR	8	(England) Sailor Brown
CF	9	(England) Arthur Turner
IL	10	(England) Don Welsh (c)
OL	11	(Scotland) Chris Duffy
Manager:
(England) Jimmy Seed

Match rules

- 90 minutes.
- 30 minutes of extra-time if necessary.
- Replay if scores still level.
- No substitutes.
