= 1933–34 in English football =

Football in England
- Season: 1933–34

Men's football
- Football League: Arsenal
- Football League Second Division: Grimsby
- FA Cup: Manchester City

The 1933–34 season was the 59th season of competitive football in England.

== Diary of the season ==
- 6 January 1934 – Arsenal manager Herbert Chapman dies of pneumonia.

== Honours ==
| Competition | Winner | Runner-up |
|---|---|---|
| First Division | Arsenal (3) | Huddersfield Town |
| Second Division | Grimsby Town | Preston North End |
| Third Division North | Barnsley | Chesterfield |
| Third Division South | Norwich City | Coventry City |
| FA Cup | Manchester City (2) | Portsmouth |
| Charity Shield | Arsenal | Everton |
| Home Championship | Wales | England |

Notes = Number in parentheses is the times that club has won that honour. * indicates new record for competition

== Football League ==
=== First Division ===
| Pos | Team | Pld | W | D | L | GF | GA | GAv | Pts | Relegation |
|---|---|---|---|---|---|---|---|---|---|---|
| 1 | Arsenal (C) | 42 | 25 | 9 | 8 | 75 | 47 | 1.596 | 59 | |
| 2 | Huddersfield Town | 42 | 23 | 10 | 9 | 90 | 61 | 1.475 | 56 | |
| 3 | Tottenham Hotspur | 42 | 21 | 7 | 14 | 79 | 56 | 1.411 | 49 | |
| 4 | Derby County | 42 | 17 | 11 | 14 | 68 | 54 | 1.259 | 45 | |
| 5 | Manchester City | 42 | 17 | 11 | 14 | 65 | 72 | 0.903 | 45 | |
| 6 | Sunderland | 42 | 16 | 12 | 14 | 81 | 56 | 1.446 | 44 | |
| 7 | West Bromwich Albion | 42 | 17 | 10 | 15 | 78 | 70 | 1.114 | 44 | |
| 8 | Blackburn Rovers | 42 | 18 | 7 | 17 | 74 | 81 | 0.914 | 43 | |
| 9 | Leeds United | 42 | 17 | 8 | 17 | 75 | 66 | 1.136 | 42 | |
| 10 | Portsmouth | 42 | 15 | 12 | 15 | 52 | 55 | 0.945 | 42 | |
| 11 | Sheffield Wednesday | 42 | 16 | 9 | 17 | 62 | 67 | 0.925 | 41 | |
| 12 | Stoke City | 42 | 15 | 11 | 16 | 58 | 71 | 0.817 | 41 | |
| 13 | Aston Villa | 42 | 14 | 12 | 16 | 78 | 75 | 1.040 | 40 | |
| 14 | Everton | 42 | 12 | 16 | 14 | 62 | 63 | 0.984 | 40 | |
| 15 | Wolverhampton Wanderers | 42 | 14 | 12 | 16 | 74 | 86 | 0.860 | 40 | |
| 16 | Middlesbrough | 42 | 16 | 7 | 19 | 68 | 80 | 0.850 | 39 | |
| 17 | Leicester City | 42 | 14 | 11 | 17 | 59 | 74 | 0.797 | 39 | |
| 18 | Liverpool | 42 | 14 | 10 | 18 | 79 | 87 | 0.908 | 38 | |
| 19 | Chelsea | 42 | 14 | 8 | 20 | 67 | 69 | 0.971 | 36 | |
| 20 | Birmingham | 42 | 12 | 12 | 18 | 54 | 56 | 0.964 | 36 | |
| 21 | Newcastle United (R) | 42 | 10 | 14 | 18 | 68 | 77 | 0.883 | 34 | Relegation to the Second Division |
| 22 | Sheffield United (R) | 42 | 12 | 7 | 23 | 58 | 101 | 0.574 | 31 | Relegation to the Second Division |

Source: World Football
Rules for classification: 1) Points; 2) Goal average; 3) Goals scored
(C) Champions; (R) Relegated

=== Second Division ===
| Pos | Team | Pld | W | D | L | GF | GA | GAv | Pts | Promotion or relegation |
|---|---|---|---|---|---|---|---|---|---|---|
| 1 | Grimsby Town (C, P) | 42 | 27 | 5 | 10 | 103 | 59 | 1.746 | 59 | Promotion to the First Division |
| 2 | Preston North End (P) | 42 | 23 | 6 | 13 | 71 | 52 | 1.365 | 52 | Promotion to the First Division |
| 3 | Bolton Wanderers | 42 | 21 | 9 | 12 | 79 | 55 | 1.436 | 51 | |
| 4 | Brentford | 42 | 22 | 7 | 13 | 85 | 60 | 1.417 | 51 | |
| 5 | Bradford (Park Avenue) | 42 | 23 | 3 | 16 | 86 | 67 | 1.284 | 49 | |
| 6 | Bradford City | 42 | 20 | 6 | 16 | 73 | 67 | 1.090 | 46 | |
| 7 | West Ham United | 42 | 17 | 11 | 14 | 78 | 70 | 1.114 | 45 | |
| 8 | Port Vale | 42 | 19 | 7 | 16 | 60 | 55 | 1.091 | 45 | |
| 9 | Oldham Athletic | 42 | 17 | 10 | 15 | 72 | 60 | 1.200 | 44 | |
| 10 | Plymouth Argyle | 42 | 15 | 13 | 14 | 69 | 70 | 0.986 | 43 | |
| 11 | Blackpool | 42 | 15 | 13 | 14 | 62 | 64 | 0.969 | 43 | |
| 12 | Bury | 42 | 17 | 9 | 16 | 70 | 73 | 0.959 | 43 | |
| 13 | Burnley | 42 | 18 | 6 | 18 | 60 | 72 | 0.833 | 42 | |
| 14 | Southampton | 42 | 15 | 8 | 19 | 54 | 58 | 0.931 | 38 | |
| 15 | Hull City | 42 | 13 | 12 | 17 | 52 | 68 | 0.765 | 38 | |
| 16 | Fulham | 42 | 15 | 7 | 20 | 48 | 67 | 0.716 | 37 | |
| 17 | Nottingham Forest | 42 | 13 | 9 | 20 | 73 | 74 | 0.986 | 35 | |
| 18 | Notts County | 42 | 12 | 11 | 19 | 53 | 62 | 0.855 | 35 | |
| 19 | Swansea Town | 42 | 10 | 15 | 17 | 51 | 60 | 0.850 | 35 | |
| 20 | Manchester United | 42 | 14 | 6 | 22 | 59 | 85 | 0.694 | 34 | |
| 21 | Millwall (R) | 42 | 11 | 11 | 20 | 39 | 68 | 0.574 | 33 | Relegation to the Third Division South |
| 22 | Lincoln City (R) | 42 | 9 | 8 | 25 | 44 | 75 | 0.587 | 26 | Relegation to the Third Division North |

Rules for classification: 1) Points; 2) Goal average; 3) Goals scored
(C) Champions; (P) Promoted; (R) Relegated

=== Third Division North ===
| Pos | Team | Pld | W | D | L | GF | GA | GAv | Pts | Promotion |
|---|---|---|---|---|---|---|---|---|---|---|
| 1 | Barnsley (C, P) | 42 | 27 | 8 | 7 | 118 | 61 | 1.934 | 62 | Promotion to the Second Division |
| 2 | Chesterfield | 42 | 27 | 7 | 8 | 86 | 43 | 2.000 | 61 | |
| 3 | Stockport County | 42 | 24 | 11 | 7 | 115 | 52 | 2.212 | 59 | |
| 4 | Walsall | 42 | 23 | 7 | 12 | 97 | 60 | 1.617 | 53 | |
| 5 | Doncaster Rovers | 42 | 22 | 9 | 11 | 83 | 61 | 1.361 | 53 | |
| 6 | Wrexham | 42 | 23 | 5 | 14 | 102 | 73 | 1.397 | 51 | |
| 7 | Tranmere Rovers | 42 | 20 | 7 | 15 | 84 | 63 | 1.333 | 47 | |
| 8 | Barrow | 42 | 19 | 9 | 14 | 116 | 94 | 1.234 | 47 | |
| 9 | Halifax Town | 42 | 20 | 4 | 18 | 80 | 91 | 0.879 | 44 | |
| 10 | Chester | 42 | 17 | 6 | 19 | 89 | 86 | 1.035 | 40 | |
| 11 | Hartlepools United | 42 | 16 | 7 | 19 | 89 | 93 | 0.957 | 39 | |
| 12 | York City | 42 | 15 | 8 | 19 | 71 | 74 | 0.959 | 38 | |
| 13 | Carlisle United | 42 | 15 | 8 | 19 | 66 | 81 | 0.815 | 38 | |
| 14 | Crewe Alexandra | 42 | 15 | 6 | 21 | 81 | 97 | 0.835 | 36 | |
| 15 | New Brighton | 42 | 14 | 8 | 20 | 62 | 87 | 0.713 | 36 | |
| 16 | Darlington | 42 | 13 | 9 | 20 | 70 | 101 | 0.693 | 35 | |
| 17 | Mansfield Town | 42 | 11 | 12 | 19 | 81 | 88 | 0.920 | 34 | |
| 18 | Southport | 42 | 8 | 17 | 17 | 63 | 90 | 0.700 | 33 | |
| 19 | Gateshead | 42 | 12 | 9 | 21 | 76 | 110 | 0.691 | 33 | |
| 20 | Accrington Stanley | 42 | 13 | 7 | 22 | 65 | 101 | 0.644 | 33 | |
| 21 | Rotherham United | 42 | 10 | 8 | 24 | 53 | 91 | 0.582 | 28 | Re-elected |
| 22 | Rochdale | 42 | 9 | 6 | 27 | 53 | 103 | 0.515 | 24 | Re-elected |

Source: rsssf.com
(C) Champions; (P) Promoted

=== Third Division South ===
| Pos | Team | Pld | W | D | L | GF | GA | GAv | Pts | Promotion |
|---|---|---|---|---|---|---|---|---|---|---|
| 1 | Norwich City (C, P) | 42 | 25 | 11 | 6 | 88 | 49 | 1.796 | 61 | Promotion to the Second Division |
| 2 | Coventry City | 42 | 21 | 12 | 9 | 100 | 54 | 1.852 | 54 | |
| 3 | Reading | 42 | 21 | 12 | 9 | 82 | 50 | 1.640 | 54 | |
| 4 | Queens Park Rangers | 42 | 24 | 6 | 12 | 70 | 51 | 1.373 | 54 | |
| 5 | Charlton Athletic | 42 | 22 | 8 | 12 | 83 | 56 | 1.482 | 52 | |
| 6 | Luton Town | 42 | 21 | 10 | 11 | 83 | 61 | 1.361 | 52 | |
| 7 | Bristol Rovers | 42 | 20 | 11 | 11 | 77 | 47 | 1.638 | 51 | |
| 8 | Swindon Town | 42 | 17 | 11 | 14 | 64 | 68 | 0.941 | 45 | |
| 9 | Exeter City | 42 | 16 | 11 | 15 | 68 | 57 | 1.193 | 43 | |
| 10 | Brighton & Hove Albion | 42 | 15 | 13 | 14 | 68 | 60 | 1.133 | 43 | |
| 11 | Clapton Orient | 42 | 16 | 10 | 16 | 75 | 69 | 1.087 | 42 | |
| 12 | Crystal Palace | 42 | 16 | 9 | 17 | 71 | 67 | 1.060 | 41 | |
| 13 | Northampton Town | 42 | 14 | 12 | 16 | 71 | 78 | 0.910 | 40 | |
| 14 | Aldershot | 42 | 13 | 12 | 17 | 52 | 71 | 0.732 | 38 | |
| 15 | Watford | 42 | 15 | 7 | 20 | 71 | 63 | 1.127 | 37 | |
| 16 | Southend United | 42 | 12 | 10 | 20 | 51 | 74 | 0.689 | 34 | |
| 17 | Gillingham | 42 | 11 | 11 | 20 | 75 | 96 | 0.781 | 33 | |
| 18 | Newport County | 42 | 8 | 17 | 17 | 49 | 70 | 0.700 | 33 | |
| 19 | Bristol City | 42 | 10 | 13 | 19 | 58 | 85 | 0.682 | 33 | |
| 20 | Torquay United | 42 | 13 | 7 | 22 | 53 | 93 | 0.570 | 33 | |
| 21 | Bournemouth & Boscombe Athletic | 42 | 9 | 9 | 24 | 60 | 102 | 0.588 | 27 | Re-elected |
| 22 | Cardiff City | 42 | 9 | 6 | 27 | 57 | 105 | 0.543 | 24 | Re-elected |

(C) Champions; (P) Promoted

=== Top goalscorers ===
First Division

- Jack Bowers (Derby County) – 34 goals

Second Division

- Pat Glover (Grimsby Town) – 42 goals

Third Division North

- Alf Lythgoe (Stockport County) – 46 goals

Third Division South

- Albert Dawes (Northampton Town and Crystal Palace) – 27 goals
