= Paul Burgess (groundskeeper) =

English groundskeeper

- Born: 1978 (age 47–48); Blackpool, Lancashire, England
- Years active: 1994–
- Known for: Turf management

Paul Burgess (born 1978) is an English groundskeeper who specialises in turf management of football pitches. He is recognised as the world leader in turf management, and has won five Premier League Groundsman of the Year awards and accolades from the Institute of Groundsmanship.

== Early life ==
In 1992, after realising he did not have the ability to make it as a professional footballer, a 14-year-old Burgess explored other avenues of becoming involved with the sport. He read an interview with Arsenal F.C.'s head groundsman Steve Braddock, in either Shoot! or Match magazines, which led him to find out if his upcoming work experience stint could be served at his local professional club, Blackpool F.C.

Burgess attended Montgomery High School in Bispham between 1989 and 1994. He then studied a three-year turf management course at Myerscough College in Bilsborrow.

A Blackpool fan, Burgess used to sell programmes outside their Bloomfield Road ground on matchdays; over two decades later, on 22 May 2010, he was working on the Estadio Santiago Bernabeu pitch for the Champions League Final while the Seasiders were playing in their Championship play-off final at Wembley.

== Career ==
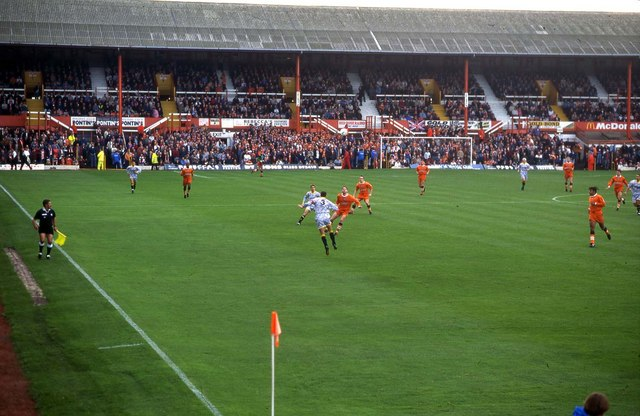
Bloomfield Road, October 1995

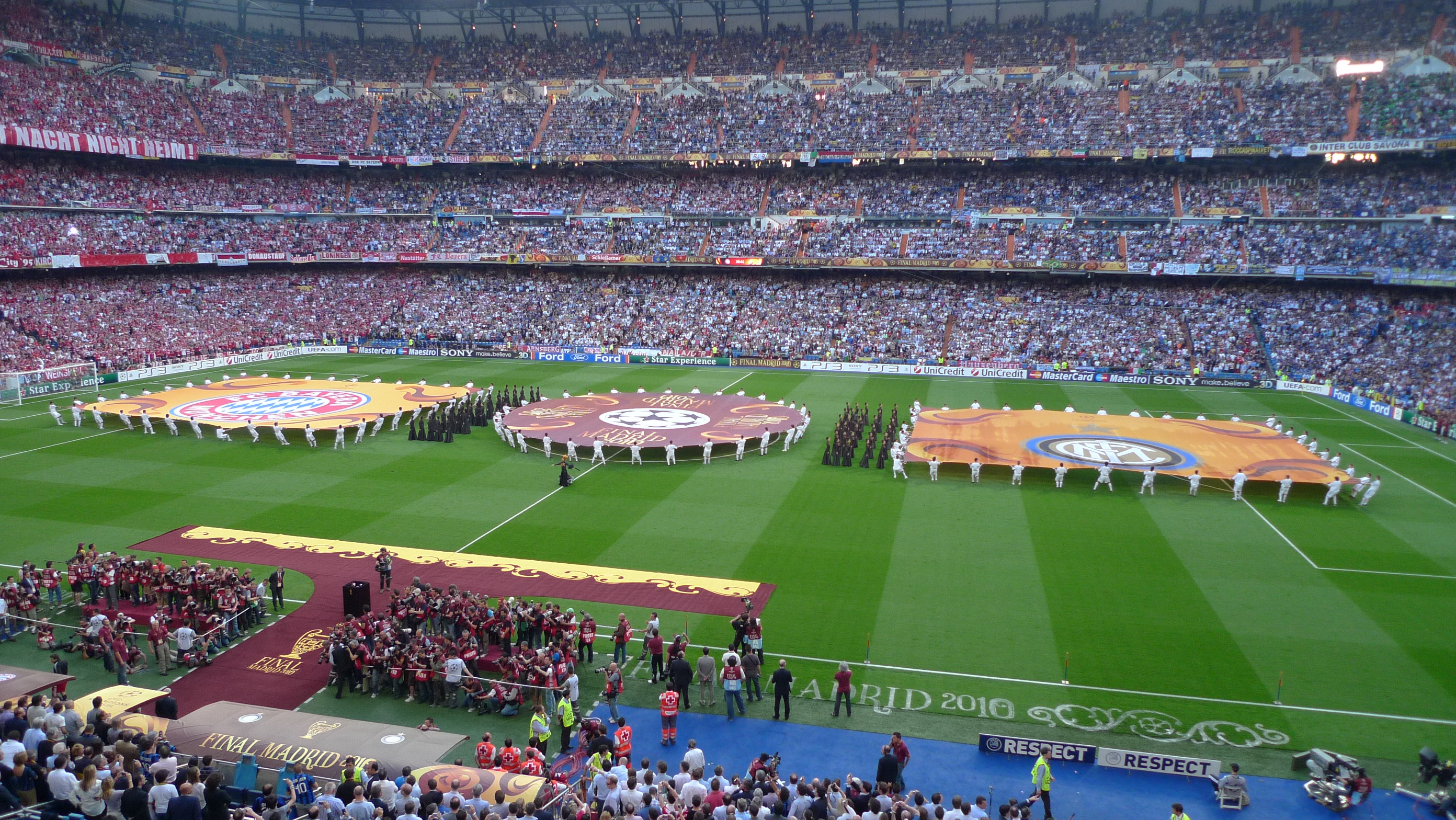
The Bernabeu during the opening ceremony for the 2010 UEFA Champions League Final

Burgess began his career in July 1995 as an apprentice groundsman at Blackpool's Bloomfield Road home, in Lancashire, England, where he was born. In November 1996, he moved on to become assistant groundsman to Steve Braddock at Arsenal between 1996 and 1999. At 21, he was promoted to being Highbury's head groundsman between 1999 and 2006, then at their new Emirates Stadium for three more years. He continued his studies at Myerscough College via a distance-learning programme.

In 2009, he was approached by Spanish club Real Madrid to improve the pitches at its Estadio Santiago Bernabeu stadium and at its training facility, Ciudad Real Madrid in Valdebebas. In all, he took care of thirteen pitches owned by the club, becoming known as their "gardener". 8.5 of the pitches were natural grass, while 4.5 were 3G surfaces. He monitored the status of the pitches in real time via six computer screens, enabling him to use additional technology to control the amount of sunlight, water and warmth the grass was exposed to. He was initially the club's grounds manager, becoming its Director of Grounds and Environment in 2018. He left the club in December 2020 to pursue a new challenge.

=== FIFA pitch consultant ===
Burgess has been a pitch consultant for FIFA, football's world governing body, since 2004.

== Personal life ==
Burgess became a father in 2010.
