= Arsenal Stadium =

Former football stadium in Highbury, North London, England

- Highbury; The Home of Football
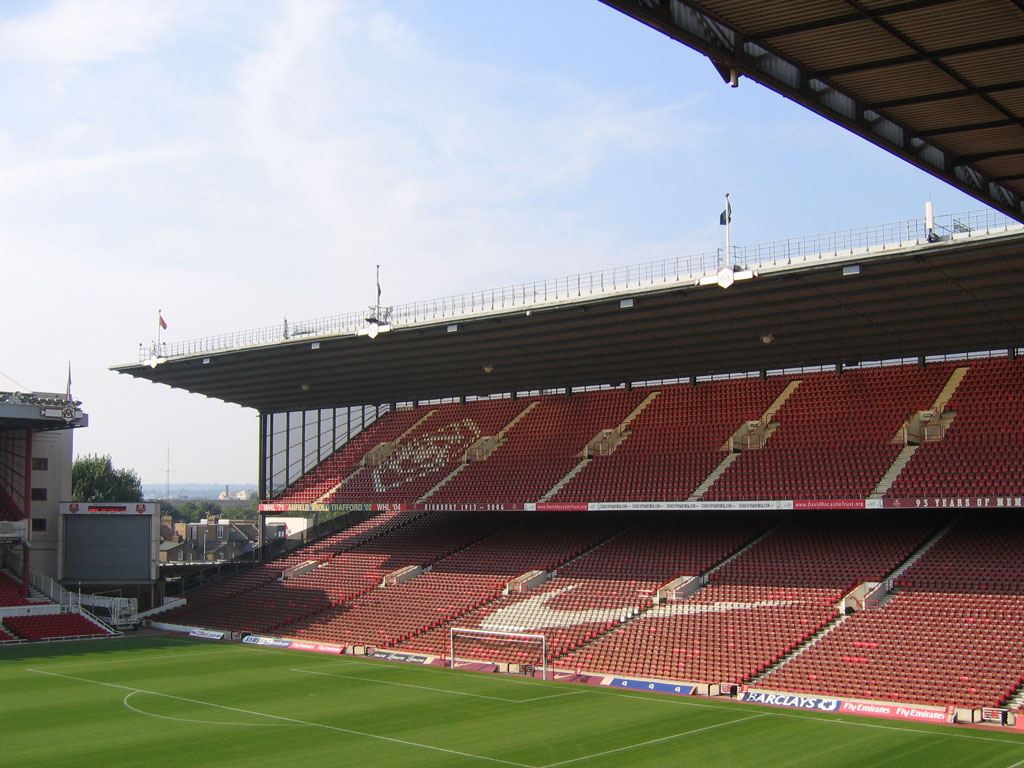
- The North Bank stand of the stadium in 2005, a year prior to demolition
- Interactive map of Arsenal Stadium
- Full name: Arsenal Stadium; Highbury Stadium
- Location: Highbury, London, England
- Coordinates: 51°33′28″N 0°6′10″W
- Owner: Arsenal Holdings plc
- Operator: Arsenal
- Capacity: 38,419 (at closure), 73,000 (peak)
- Field size: 109×73 yds / 100×67 m

Construction
- Opened: 6 September 1913
- Renovated: 1932–1936, 1992–1993
- Closed: 7 May 2006
- Demolished: 2006; redeveloped as Highbury Square
- Cost: £125,000 (1913 original) adjusted for inflation: £12.5m £175,000 (1930s redevelopment) adjusted for inflation: £9.9m £22.5m (1990s redevelopment) adjusted for inflation: £49.6m
- Architects: Archibald Leitch (1913 original); C. W. Ferrier and W. Binnie (1930s redevelopment); LOBB partnership (North Bank)

Tenant
- Arsenal F.C. (1913–2006)

Arsenal Stadium is a defunct football stadium in Highbury, London, which was the home of Arsenal Football Club between 6 September 1913 and 7 May 2006. It was popularly known as "Highbury" from the name of the district in which it was located.

It was originally built in 1913 on the site of a local college's recreation ground, and was significantly redeveloped twice. The first reconstruction came in the 1930s, from which the Art Deco East and West Stands date. There was a second development; the first phase, which added executive boxes to the Clock End, was completed in 1989, and afterward in 1993 a new North Bank Stand was constructed. These latter developments both followed the recommendations of the Taylor Report by replacing the terraces to make the stadium an all-seater with four stands. Further attempts to expand the stadium were blocked by the community, resulting in a reduction in capacity and matchday revenue. This led to Arsenal opting to build a new stadium, the Emirates Stadium.

After the club moved to its new stadium upon the conclusion of the 2005–06 season, Highbury was redeveloped as a residential development known as Highbury Square, with the Clock End and North Bank stands being demolished; parts of the East and West Stands remained and were incorporated into the new development due to their listed status.

The stadium hosted international matches – both for England and in the 1948 Summer Olympics – and FA Cup semi-finals, as well as boxing, baseball and cricket matches. Its presence also led to the local London Underground station being renamed as Arsenal in 1932, making it the only station on the Underground network to be named after a football club. In addition to its architecture, the stadium was known for its small but immaculate pitch and for the clock that had been positioned in the southern side of the ground since its introduction in 1930.

== History ==
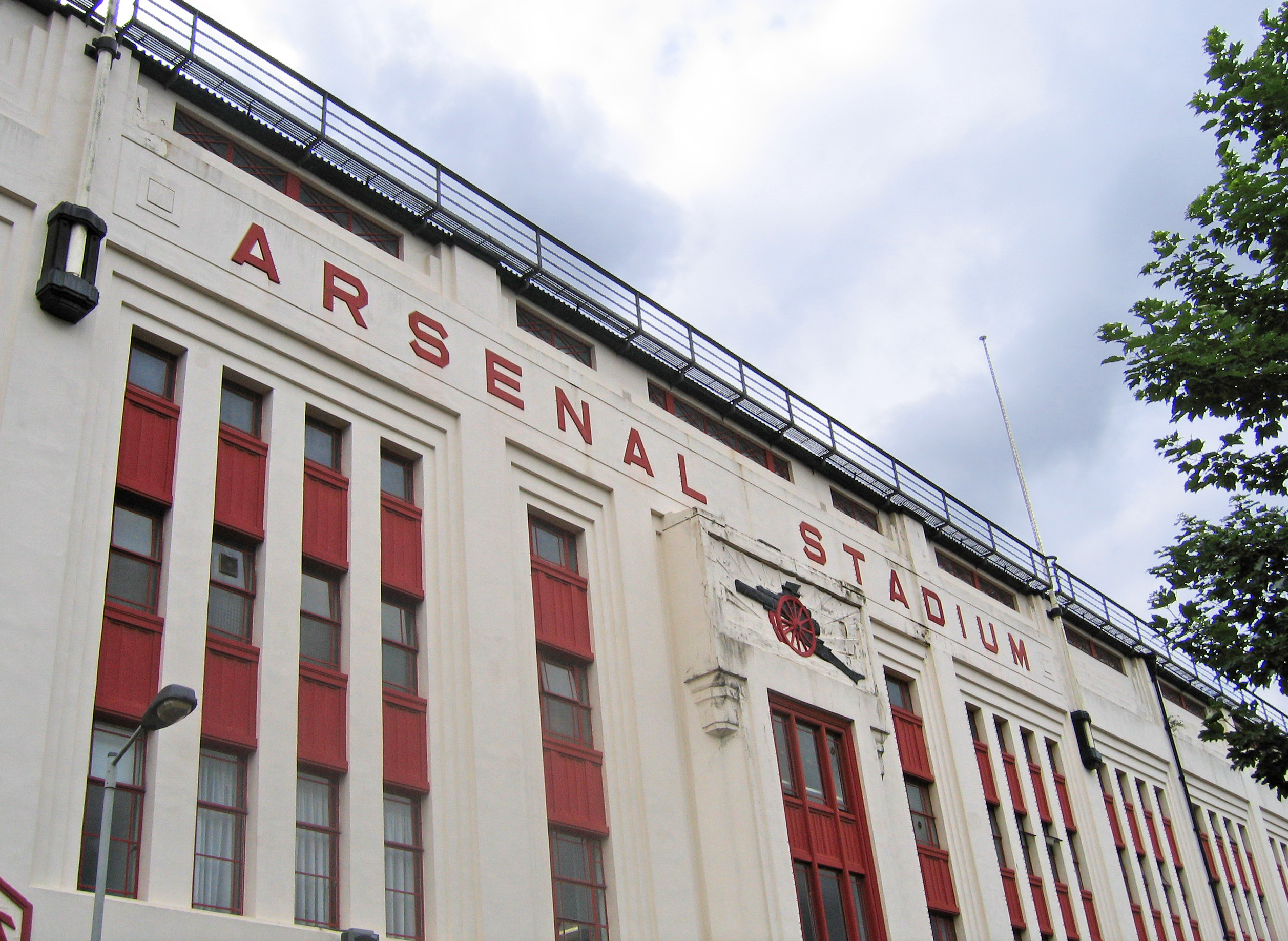
The façade of the East Stand, on Avenell Road, in 2005

The original stadium was built in 1913 after Woolwich Arsenal chairman Henry Norris moved the club from the Manor Ground in Plumstead, South East London to Highbury, leasing the recreation fields of St John's College of Divinity for 21 years for £20,000. The move was initially opposed by Islington Borough Council, residents and nearby clubs, Tottenham Hotspur and Clapton Orient. The lease agreement, signed by the Archbishop of Canterbury Randall Davidson, allowed no matches to be played on "holy days" and that no "intoxicating liquor" would be sold at the stadium; however, these stipulations were later dropped. One advantage of the site was its close proximity to Gillespie Road tube station.

The stadium, designed by Archibald Leitch, architect of many other football grounds of that era, was hurriedly built over the summer of 1913. It featured a single stand on the eastern side and the other three sides had banked terracing and cost £125,000. It opened on 6 September 1913 whilst not fully complete, for Arsenal's first match of the 1913–14 season, a 2–1 Second Division win against Leicester Fosse. Leicester's Tommy Benfield scored the first goal at the new ground while George Jobey was the first Arsenal player to do so. Highbury hosted its first England match in 1920. The Australian rugby league team suffered the first loss of their 1921–22 Kangaroo tour of Great Britain at Highbury to an English side 4 points to 5 before approximately 12,000 spectators. In 1925, Arsenal purchased the stadium site outright for the sum of £64,000.

No significant portion of Leitch's original stadium remains today following a series of bold redevelopments during the 1930s. The idea was to create a ground for London that could capture the grandeur of Villa Park, home of Birmingham club Aston Villa. The Highbury project was ambitious in its scale and reach, the first stand completed being the West Stand, designed by Claude Waterlow Ferrier and William Binnie in the Art Deco style which opened in 1932. On 5 November the same year, the local Tube station was renamed from Gillespie Road to Arsenal following successful persuasion by manager Herbert Chapman. The stadium's name was also changed from Highbury to Arsenal Stadium. Chapman next decided to install a 45-minute clock on the North Bank despite the Football Association's concern that it would undermine the referee's authority. The North Bank terrace was given a roof in 1935 and the clock was moved to the front of the southern terrace, giving it the name the Clock End. Leitch's main stand was demolished to make way for a new East Stand, matching the West, in 1936. The West Stand cost £45,000, while the East Stand went far over budget and the final cost was £130,000, this was mainly due to the expense of the facade.

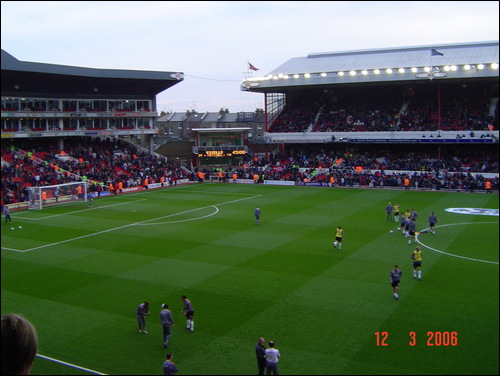
Highbury in 2006

During the 1948 Summer Olympics, the stadium hosted the football preliminaries. For the next 50 years, the stadium changed little, although during the Second World War the North Bank terrace was bombed and had to be rebuilt; the roof was not restored until 1956. Chapman had demonstrated floodlit football at Highbury in November 1932, however, the Football Association had banned its members from taking part in a floodlit match. Following the lifting of the ban in December 1950, in 1951 Arsenal became the first team in Division One to fit floodlights, with the first floodlit match being a friendly against Hapoel Tel Aviv on 19 September of that year. The floodlights that adorn Dalymount Park, once stood at the Arsenal stadium. They were shipped to Dublin in 1962. The inaugural floodlit match saw Arsenal beat Bohemians 3–8. Undersoil heating was added in 1964. Unlike at many other grounds, Arsenal refused to install perimeter fencing, even at the height of hooliganism in the 1980s, which made it ineligible for use as an FA Cup semi-final venue.

Before the Taylor report in January 1990 on the Hillsborough disaster was published, which recommended that football stadia become all-seater, both the North Bank and Clock End consisted of terracing, and the stadium often saw crowds of up to 60,000 or more; its largest attendance was 73,295 on 9 March 1935 when Arsenal played Sunderland in the First Division; the game finished 0–0. When the ground was initially constructed, it was to "accommodate 90,000 spectators". The Clock End was redeveloped in 1988–89 with the addition of a roof and 48 executive boxes, while seating was fitted into the remaining standing area in 1993.

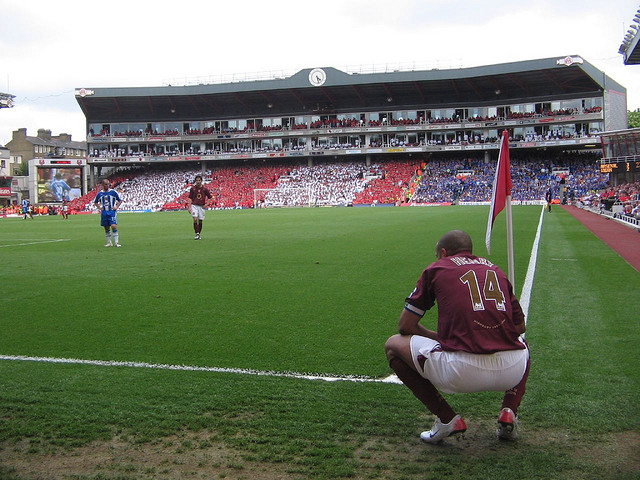
Thierry Henry waiting to take a corner kick during the last game held at Highbury, against Wigan Athletic on 7 May 2006

The North Bank, which had become home of Arsenal's most passionate supporters, was demolished at the end of the 1991–92 season. During redevelopment, a giant mural of fans was placed behind the goal at that end, to give the illusion that the players were kicking towards a crowd rather than a construction site. The mural initially attracted criticism for its absence of black fans, which was quickly rectified. The lengthy process of rebuilding the North Bank meant that Highbury was three-sided for the entire 1992–93 season, which was also the first season of the new FA Premier League. Although a lack of goals meant that Arsenal only finished 10th in the new league, they won both of the domestic cup competitions that season. Populous (then LOBB Partnership) designed all-seater two-tier North Bank Stand, the last area of Highbury to be refurbished, which was opened in August 1993 at a cost of £20 million amid strong opposition from local residents. The new North Bank Stand contained a museum and a concourse with video arcades, bars, confectionery counters, souvenir shops and fast-food stands. While the all-seater North Bank was "never the same as the old-fashioned Archibald Leitch stand" that it replaced, it was "much more like the future of Arsenal than the past" with its added amenities and "Gone were the days of pushing a petrified child through a packed crowd and placing them on a barrier from which they could only see a small section of the pitch". The old stand had received a fitting send off with a 5–1 defeat of Southampton, though the new stand had a less auspicious start, the first game being a surprise 0–3 defeat to Coventry City with all three goals coming from striker Micky Quinn. The first victory came 10 days later against Leeds United.

Arsenal did not always play their home matches at Highbury in the 93 years they were based there. During the Second World War the stadium was used as an ARP station and was bombed; Arsenal played their matches at White Hart Lane, home of North London rivals Tottenham Hotspur, until Highbury re-opened in 1946. More recently, Arsenal's home UEFA Champions League matches in the 1998–99 and 1999–00 seasons were played at Wembley Stadium, as Highbury's already limited capacity had to be reduced to accommodate advertising hoardings. Arsenal's record at Wembley (P6 W2 D1 L3) was relatively poor, and after two seasons the club switched back to playing at Highbury, not least because since Wembley closed for rebuilding in October 2000, it would not have been able to host their 2000–01 campaign. The club set a record attendance at Wembley, with 73,707 against RC Lens on 25 November 1998.

== Structure ==
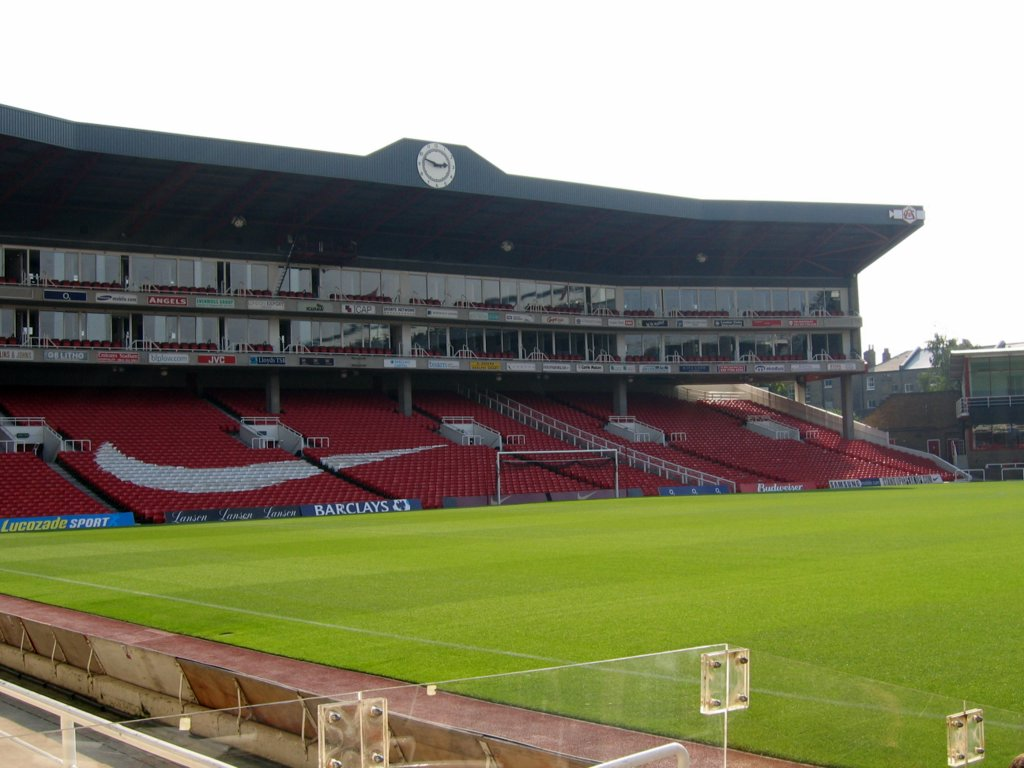
The Clock End, with executive boxes above, in 2005; since demolished

At the time of its closure, the stadium consisted of four separate all-seater stands; the pitch was aligned north–south, with the North Bank Stand (formerly the Laundry End) and South Stand (popularly known as the Clock End) at the ends of the field. The East and West Stands ran alongside the pitch and are two of the few examples of British football stands designed in the Art Deco style. The East Stand incorporated the club's offices and was well known for its marble halls (though the floors were actually terrazzo) which are often cited in media depictions of the stadium, and the facade that faces onto Avenell Road. The East Stand is considered architecturally significant enough to have been designated a Grade II listed building.

Herbert Chapman bust on the Marble Halls

The stadium's main entrances were on Gillespie Road, Avenell Road and Highbury Hill. When it closed, Highbury had a capacity of 38,419 (approximately 12,500 in the North Bank, 11,000 in the West Stand, 9,000 in the East Stand and 6,000 in the Clock End), all seated, and had Jumbotron screens in the south-east and north-west corners. Arsenal Stadium was well known for its very small immaculately-kept pitch, which measured only 109×73 yards (100×67 metres). Arsenal's groundsmen, Steve Braddock and his successor Paul Burgess, won the FA Premier League's Groundsman of the Year award several times for their work on the stadium.

== Closure and redevelopment ==
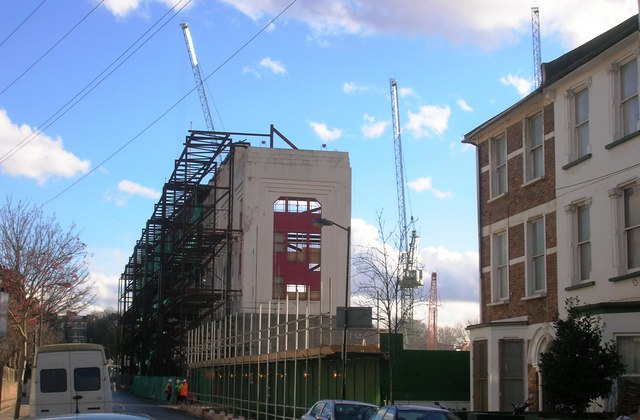
The façades of the East Stand (pictured in 2007) and West Stand were retained during the demolition of the stadium.

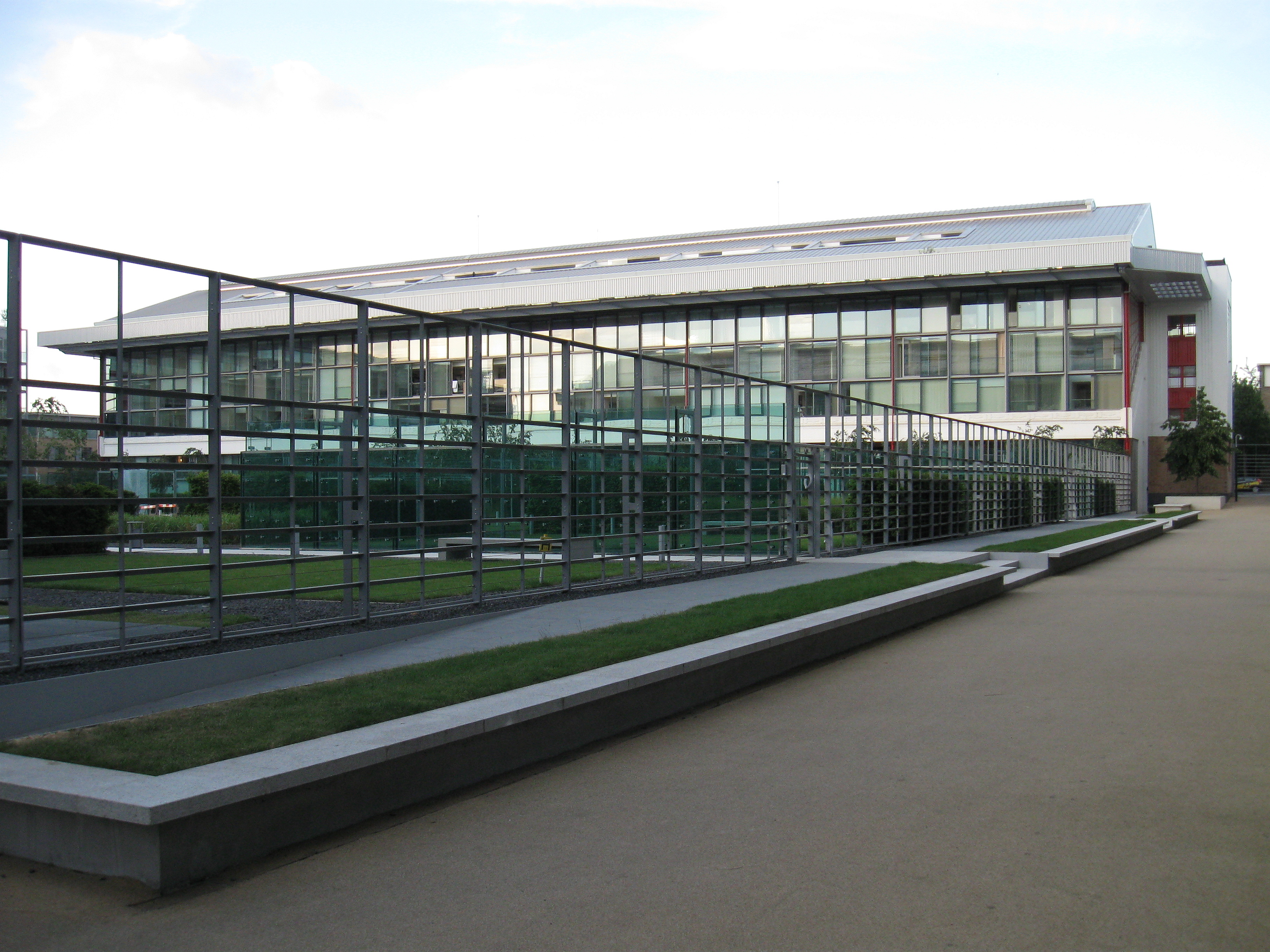
Flats in one of Highbury Square's converted Listed Stands.

The post-Taylor capacity of Highbury was limited to 38,419, while Arsenal's success during the 1990s and 2000s meant that virtually every home match was filled to near capacity. Restrictions, such as the East Stand's status as a listed building and the fact the stadium was surrounded on all sides by a residential area, made any future expansion of Highbury difficult and expensive, although the club's directors would have liked to have kept Arsenal at a modernised and expanded Highbury. In October 1998, just after Arsenal started playing Champions League games at Wembley, the club made an unsuccessful bid to buy the stadium and make it their permanent home to share with the England national football team.

In November 1999, Arsenal decided to leave Highbury and construct a new 60,000-seat stadium in nearby Ashburton Grove. It was confirmed in October 2004 that the new stadium would be called the Emirates Stadium as part of a sponsorship deal with the airline Emirates. The stadium opened in July 2006; Arsenal's offices were moved to a new building, Highbury House, which was named in commemoration of the former stadium.

For their final season at Highbury (2005–06) Arsenal ran a series of promotions honouring the stadium's legacy. A commemorative logo was designed featuring the club's traditional Art Deco crest from the 1930s, and the club's history at Highbury was celebrated through a series of themed matchdays. On the field, Arsenal temporarily set aside their traditional red shirts with white sleeves for the season and adopted a solid redcurrant shirt, the colour they wore during their first season at Highbury in 1913–14.

Arsenal's final game at the stadium was their FA Premier League match on 7 May 2006 against Wigan Athletic, the last game of the season. The team needed to better the result of neighbours Tottenham Hotspur to again secure qualification for the Champions League. Having been 2–1 behind, a hat trick by captain and all-time leading goal scorer Thierry Henry secured qualification, with Henry kneeling down to kiss the turf on scoring what proved to be the final goal seen at the stadium. The last goal scored in a regulation game at the stadium came in a Football Aid charity match when lifelong fan Alan Alger scored a penalty in the final minute of a fixture played on Thursday 8 June 2006 (exactly one month and one day after Henry's goal). After the stadium's closure, Arsenal held an auction to sell off many of the stadium's parts, including pieces of the pitch, the goalposts and former manager George Graham's desk. Sale of the stadium's seats had to be cancelled after it was found they contained trace amounts of the toxic metal cadmium.

As of 2010, The former Arsenal Stadium was redeveloped and converted into flats in a project known as "Highbury Square", a scheme that had 711 properties built on the site. The North Bank and Clock End stands were demolished. The exteriors of the listed Art Deco East Stand and the matching West Stand were preserved and incorporated into the new developments, while the rest of the stands' structures were removed, and the pitch became a communal garden. In October 2005 the proposed flats went on sale; as of May 2006 all properties in the North, East and West Stands had been taken.

Arsenal's clock was moved from Highbury to the outer side of the new stadium, with a new larger version of the feature added inside the ground in August 2010. At the same time as the unveiling of the new clock, the south stands at the venue were also renamed Clock End in line with the same name previously used at Highbury.

== Arsenal's record of results ==
Arsenal's complete competitive record at Highbury is as follows:

Competition	P	W	D	L	F	A	Win %
League (Note: Includes Premier League, First Division and Second Division.)	1689	981	412	296	3372	1692	58%
FA Cup (Note: One of these matches, a 5–1 win over Farnborough Town in 2003, was officially an "away" match, but after the draw the venue was switched to Highbury at Farnborough's request.)	142	92	32	18	305	123	64.5%
League Cup	98	69	14	15	195	74	70%
Europe (Note: Includes Champions League, Cup Winners' Cup, UEFA Cup and European Super Cup.)	76	50	17	9	153	60	66%
Charity Shield	5	4	0	1	13	6	80%
Total	2010	1196	475	339	4038	1955	60%

=== Record scorelines ===
Arsenal's biggest win at Highbury came on 9 January 1932, with an 11–1 victory over Darwen in the FA Cup. Their biggest defeats were 0–5 losses to Huddersfield Town in the First Division on 14 February 1925 and against Chelsea in the League Cup on 11 November 1998.

== Other events ==
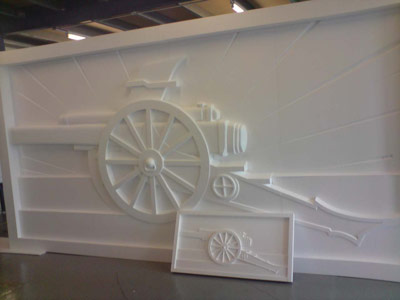
A replica facade of the cannon made from polystyrene for the redevelopment

=== International football ===
As well as being home to Arsenal, the stadium also hosted games for England matches; 12 internationals were played at Highbury from 1920 to 1961, most of them being friendlies. These included both England's first full home international against opposition outside of Great Britain and Ireland (Belgium in 1923), and the "Battle of Highbury", England's 3–2 win over World Champions Italy in 1934, where a record seven Arsenal players started the match, the most players from a single club to play in an England fixture.

England's record at Highbury is as follows:

Competition	P	W	D	L	F	A	Win %
World Cup Qualifiers	1	1	0	0	4	1	100%
British Home Championship	1	0	0	1	1	2	0%
Friendly matches (Note: One of these matches was a 3–0 win against a "Rest of Europe" side in 1938; although caps were awarded at the time, FIFA have since struck it from their records as an official international. The Football Association continues to recognise it as an official match.)	10	8	2	0	42	12	80%
Total	12	9	2	1	47	15	75%

In May 1963, England played The Football League XI at the stadium to celebrate the 100th anniversary of the Football Association and the 75th anniversary of the Football League. The stadium was also used as a football venue for two matches in the 1948 London Olympics – a first-round match and a quarter-final. It was also provisionally named as one of London's two host stadiums for the 1966 FIFA World Cup (along with Wembley), but was eventually dropped with White City Stadium taking the role instead. By the time of Euro 96, the pitch had been ruled too small for international football and the stadium would have been ineligible.

=== FA Cup semi-finals ===
Highbury was the venue for twelve FA Cup semi-finals as a neutral ground; the first in 1929 and the last in 1997. Between 1984 and 1992 the stadium was not included in the FA's list of approved venues after Arsenal refused to install perimeter fencing following a pitch invasion by Everton fans during their semi-final against Southampton. FA Cup semi-finals held at Highbury are listed below. Teams in bold went on to win the competition that year

#	Date	Winner	Score	Loser
1	1929	Portsmouth	1–0	Aston Villa
2	1937	Preston North End	4–1	West Bromwich Albion
3	1939	**Portsmouth**	2–1	Huddersfield Town
4	1949	Leicester City	3–1	Portsmouth
5	1958	Manchester United	5–3	Fulham
6	1978	**Ipswich Town**	3–1	West Bromwich Albion
7	1981	**Tottenham Hotspur**	3–0	Wolverhampton Wanderers
8	1982	Queens Park Rangers	1–0	West Bromwich Albion
9	1983	Brighton & Hove Albion	2–1	Sheffield Wednesday
10	1984	**Everton**	1–0 aet	Southampton
11	1992	**Liverpool**	1–1	Portsmouth
12	1997	**Chelsea**	3–0	Wimbledon

=== FA Amateur Cup finals ===
Arsenal Stadium was the venue for three FA Amateur Cup finals until it moved permanently to Wembley Stadium in 1949.

#	Date	Winner	Score	Runner-up
1	1929	Ilford	3–1	Leyton
2	1931	Wycombe Wanderers	1–0	Hayes
3	1947	Leytonstone	2–1	Wimbledon

=== 1955-58 Inter-Cities Fairs Cup ===
The stadium hosted the London XI's home leg against Lausanne Sports in the 1955–58 Inter-Cities Fairs Cup semi-finals; London won 2–0 on the night and 3–2 on aggregate.

=== Other sporting events ===
The stadium hosted several cricket games and also baseball matches involving American servicemen between 1916 and 1919. It was the venue for the 1966 World Heavyweight boxing title bout between Henry Cooper and Muhammad Ali, which Ali won. Highbury also played host to an international rugby league match on 10 October 1921 as part of the Australian rugby league team's 1921–22 Kangaroo tour of Great Britain. The match saw England defeat Australia 5–4 in front of 12,000 fans.

== Broadcasting milestones ==
On 22 January 1927, Arsenal's game against Sheffield United was the first radio broadcast of a football match. On 16 September 1937, a practice match between Arsenal and their reserves was the first trial televised game.

== Appearance in films ==
The stadium has been the backdrop for at least three films, including The Arsenal Stadium Mystery (1939) and Fever Pitch (1997). A floodlight match in the stadium, against unknown opposition, is the setting for the climax of the 1960 film Jackpot.
