= List of Derby County F.C. managers =

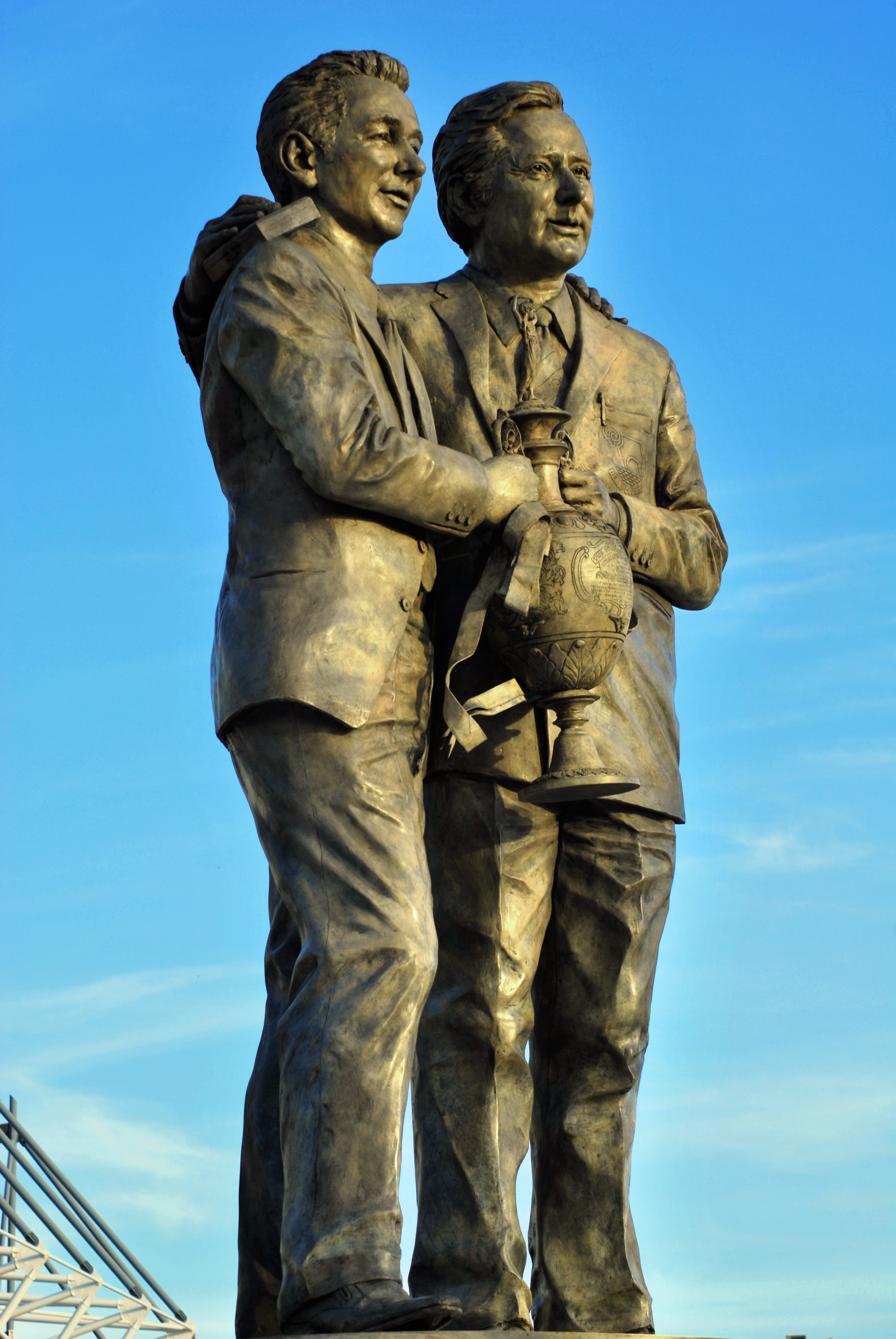
Statue outside Pride Park Stadium of Derby County's 1972 Football League-winning manager Brian Clough and his assistant Peter Taylor, who also managed the club

Derby County is an English association football club based in Derby, Derbyshire. The club was formed in 1884 but didn't appoint a full-time manager until 1896; prior to this the team for each match was selected by committee, a common practice in the early days of professional football. This chronological list comprises all those who have held the position of manager of the first team since 1896. Each manager's entry includes his dates of tenure and the club's overall competitive record (in terms of matches won, drawn and lost), honours won and significant achievements while under his care. Caretaker managers are included, where known, as well as those who have been in permanent charge. Derby have had 26 full-time managers. The most successful of these is Brian Clough, who won the club's first ever Football League title and reached the semi-final of the European Cup. The club's longest-serving managers were Jimmy Methven and George Jobey, who managed the club for 16 years, with Jobey being in charge for a club-record 629 games.

== Managers ==
As of 6 November 2026

Name	From	To	Record							Notes
Name	From	To	P	W	D	L	W %	L %	PPG	Notes
W.D. Clarke	1895									Secretary and Manager
(England) Harry Newbould	1 August 1896	31 July 1906	376	151	81	144	40.16	38.3	1.42	FA Cup finalists (1897–98, 1898–99, 1902–03)
(Scotland) Jimmy Methven	1 August 1906	30 June 1922	498	202	117	179	40.56	35.94	1.45	Division Two champions (1911–12, 1914–15)
(England) Cecil Potter	1 July 1922	31 July 1925	137	62	34	41	45.26	29.93	1.61	
(England) George Jobey	1 August 1925	1 May 1941	629	273	140	216	43.4	34.34	1.52	Division One runners-up (1929–30, 1935–36); Division Two promotion (1925–26)
(England) Ted Magner	1 August 1944	1 January 1946	11	9	2	0	81.82	0	2.64	Football League North champions (1944–45); Midlands Cup winners (1944–45)
(England) Stuart McMillan	1 January 1946	1 November 1953	346	146	73	127	42.2	36.71	1.48	FA Cup winners (1945–46)
(England) Jack Barker	1 November 1953	1 April 1955	64	12	16	36	18.75	56.25	0.81	
(England) Harry Storer Jr.	1 June 1955	31 May 1962	332	137	67	118	41.27	35.54	1.44	Football League Division Three North champions (1956–57)
(England) Tim Ward	1 June 1962	31 May 1967	219	72	59	88	32.88	40.18	1.26	
(England) Brian Clough	1 June 1967	15 October 1973	289	135	70	84	46.71	29.07	1.64	Division One champions (1971–72); Division Two champions (1968–69); European Cup semi-finalists (1972–73)
(Scotland) Jimmy Gordon	15 October 1973	23 October 1973	2	1	1	0	50	0	2	Caretaker manager
(Scotland) Dave Mackay	23 October 1973	25 November 1976	158	70	44	44	44.3	27.85	1.61	Division One champions (1974–75); Charity Shield winners (1975)
(England) Colin Murphy	25 November 1976	17 September 1977	35	7	15	13	20	37.14	1.03	
(Scotland) Tommy Docherty	17 September 1977	10 May 1979	78	24	21	33	30.77	42.31	1.19	
(England) Colin Addison	6 July 1979	25 January 1982	105	33	28	44	31.43	41.9	1.21	
(England) John Newman	25 January 1982	11 August 1982	35	6	13	16	17.14	45.71	0.89	
(England) Peter Taylor	11 August 1982	4 April 1984	66	19	22	25	28.79	37.88	1.2	
(England) Roy McFarland	4 April 1984	28 May 1984	9	4	1	4	44.44	44.44	1.44	
(England) Arthur Cox	28 May 1984	2 October 1993	453	184	108	161	40.62	35.54	1.46	Division Two champions (1986–87)
(England) Roy McFarland	2 October 1993	29 April 1995	93	40	21	31	43.01	33.33	1.52	
(Scotland) Billy McEwan	29 April 1995	15 June 1995	1	0	0	1	0	100	0	Caretaker manager
(England) Jim Smith	15 June 1995	7 October 2001	281	99	81	101	35.23	35.94	1.35	New Division One runners-up (1995–96)
(England) Colin Todd	8 October 2001	14 January 2002	17	4	2	11	23.53	64.71	0.82	
(Scotland) Billy McEwan	14 January 2002	30 January 2002	2	0	0	2	0	100	0	Caretaker manager
(England) John Gregory	30 January 2002	21 March 2003	55	16	9	30	29.09	54.55	1.04	
(England) Mark Lillis	21 March 2003	31 March 2003	1	0	0	1	0	100	0	Caretaker manager
(Scotland) George Burley	31 March 2003	7 June 2005	107	39	25	43	36.45	40.19	1.33	
(England) Phil Brown	24 June 2005	30 January 2006	33	7	14	12	21.21	36.36	1.06	
(England) Terry Westley	30 January 2006	2 June 2006	16	4	6	6	25	37.5	1.13	
(Scotland) Billy Davies	2 June 2006	26 November 2007	69	31	14	24	44.93	34.78	1.55	Championship playoffs winners (2006–07)
(England) Paul Jewell	28 November 2007	29 December 2008	58	13	15	30	22.41	51.72	0.93	
(England) Chris Hutchings	29 December 2008	6 January 2009	1	1	0	0	100	0	3	Caretaker manager
(England) David Lowe	6 January 2009	8 January 2009	1	1	0	0	100	0	3	Caretaker manager
(England) Nigel Clough	8 January 2009	28 September 2013	231	76	54	101	32.9	43.72	1.22	
(England) Darren Wassall	29 September 2013	1 October 2013	1	0	1	0	0	0	1	Caretaker manager
(England) Steve McClaren	1 October 2013	25 May 2015	95	51	22	22	54.26	23.4	1.84	
(England) Paul Clement	1 June 2015	8 February 2016	33	14	12	7	42.42	21.21	1.64	
(England) Darren Wassall	8 February 2016	27 May 2016	18	9	3	6	50	33.33	1.67	Interim head coach
(England) Nigel Pearson	27 May 2016	8 October 2016	14	3	5	6	21.43	42.86	1	
(England) Chris Powell	27 September 2016	12 October 2016	2	1	1	0	50	0	2	Caretaker manager
(England) Steve McClaren	12 October 2016	12 March 2017	29	13	7	9	44.83	31.03	1.59	
(England) Gary Rowett	14 March 2017	22 May 2018	60	26	18	16	43.33	26.67	1.6	
(England) Frank Lampard	31 May 2018	4 July 2019	57	24	17	16	42.11	28.07	1.56	
(Netherlands) Phillip Cocu	5 July 2019	14 November 2020	65	21	18	26	32.31	40	1.25	
(England) Wayne Rooney	15 November 2020	24 June 2022	85 (Note: Includes two games as part of a four man coaching setup (alongside Liam Rosenior, Shay Given and Justin Walker) and one FA Cup match in which Rooney and the entire Derby County first team squad were unavailable due to COVID-19 cases within the squad and resulting restrictions. Pat Lyons took temporary charge of an academy side in the 2–0 loss to Chorley, which is included as part of Rooney's record during his tenure.)	24	22	39	28.57	45.24	1.12	Interim player-manager (until 15 January 2021)
(England) Liam Rosenior	26 June 2022	22 September 2022	12	7	2	3	58.33	25	1.92	Interim manager
(England) Paul Warne	22 September 2022	7 February 2025	132	60	31	41	45.45	31.06	1.6	League One runners-up (2023-24)
(England) Matt Hamshaw	7 February 2025	13 February 2025	2	0	2	0	0	0	1	Caretaker manager
(England) John Eustace	13 February 2025	Present	79	28	17	34	35.44	43.04	1.28	
