= Highbury Square =

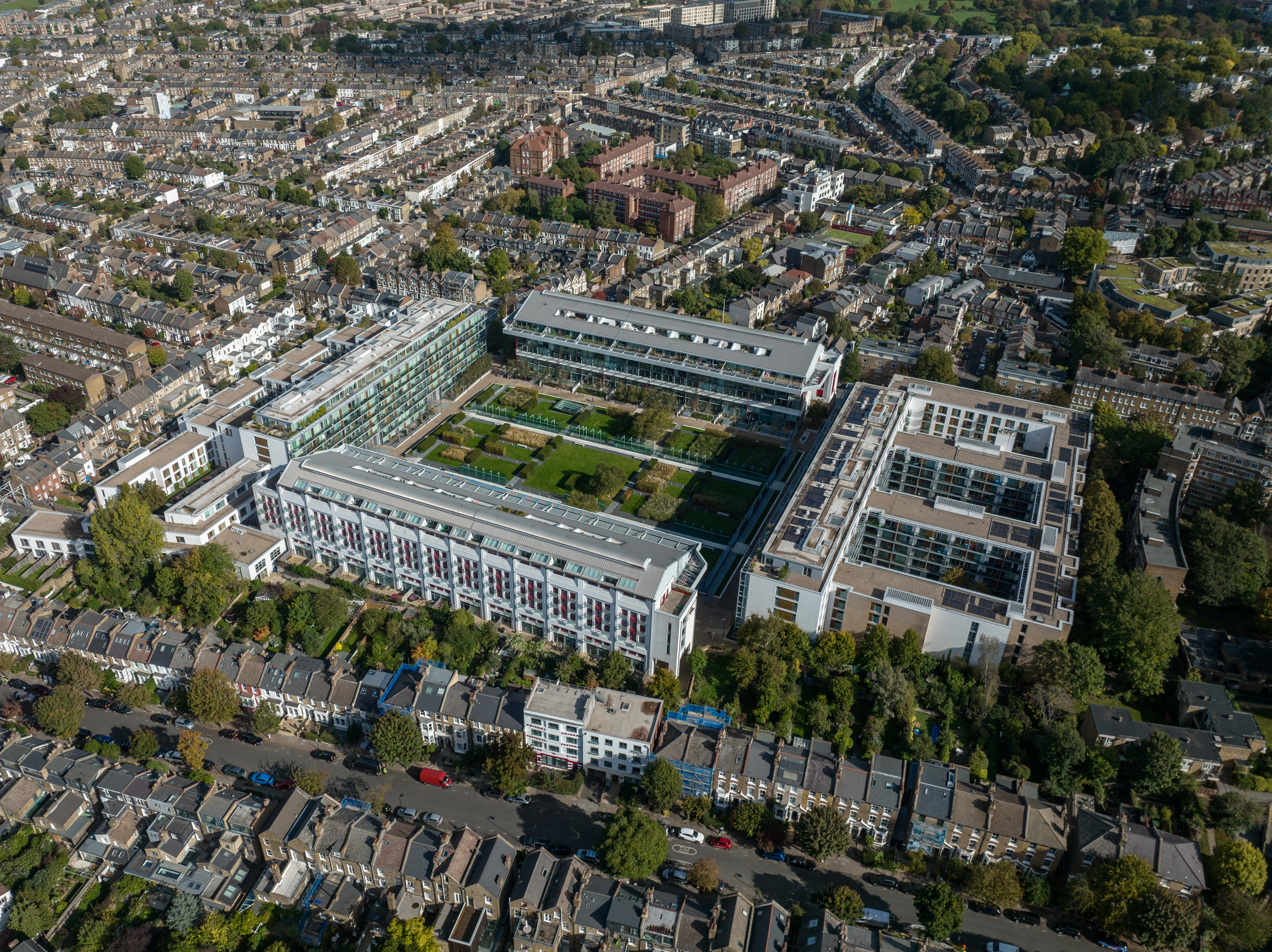
- Aerial view of Highbury Square in 2022
- Interactive map of the Highbury Square area
- Former names: Arsenal Stadium
- Alternative names: Highbury

General information
- Type: Apartment complex
- Location: Highbury, Avenell Road, N5, London, England
- Coordinates: 51°33′28″N 0°6′10″W
- Construction started: 2006
- Completed: 2010
- Owner: Arsenal F.C.

Design and construction
- Architects: Claude Waterlow Ferrier and William Binnie

Renovating team
- Architect: Allies and Morrison
- Renovating firm: Sir Robert McAlpine Ltd.

Highbury Square is an apartment complex in Highbury, London. It is a redevelopment of the old Highbury Stadium site, the home stadium of Arsenal F.C. until 2006 when they moved to the newly built Emirates Stadium nearby.

== History ==
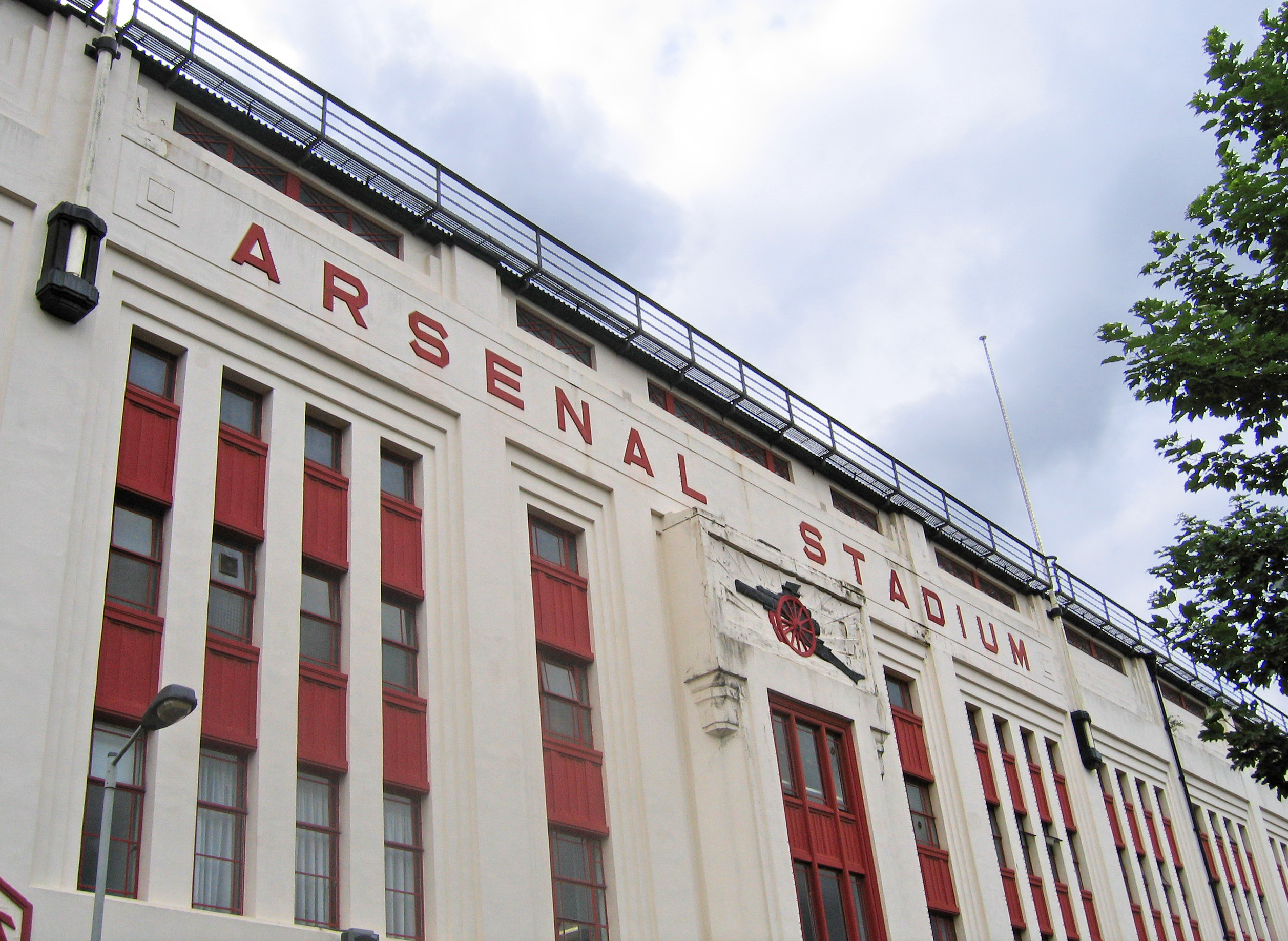
The East Stand facade

The venue was the home of Arsenal for 93 years until 2006, when the club moved to Emirates Stadium. Arsenal moved to Highbury from Woolwich in 1913 and Highbury's first stands were designed by Archibald Leitch. The main East and West stands were rebuilt in the 1930s in the Art Deco style. Their façades remain in the present development.

== Redevelopment ==
The North Bank and Clock End were demolished while the older Grade II listed buildings of the East and West Stands remained as part of the development. The pitch was redeveloped into gardens. Several parts of Arsenal Stadium were retained including the marble halls, the bust of Herbert Chapman and the players' tunnel. It was opened officially in 2009, by Arsenal manager Arsène Wenger.

Designed by Allies and Morrison, the renovation of the complex has been praised by critics for creating "a feeling of openness and nature" while also providing "protection and privacy". In 2009, Highbury Square's design won the MIPIM Special Jury Award.

== Characterisation ==
Highbury Square has 650 flats, which have a relatively high ground rent and many communal services (a higher-income centred service charge). The square has a public footpath through it and any public approach way, though little open to the sky, means it is arguably considered rather than a green court/courtyard, a garden square - the path was briefly forestalled for better drainage to be made.

In 2009, Arsenal sold 150 flats to London & Stamford Property at a 20% discount to brochure asking price as dozens of "buyers" (the word is used loosely in this context) failed to exchange contracts (or complete). Arsenal cleared their conversion bill by 2010.

== Sustainable design ==
The development's design incorporated some of the most up to date thinking to reduce carbon emissions, including the largest solar thermal heating installation of its type in Europe at the time of its construction together with combined heat and power (CHP) plant feeding into a district heating system which serves the whole development.
