= Cricket pitch =

Central strip of the cricket field

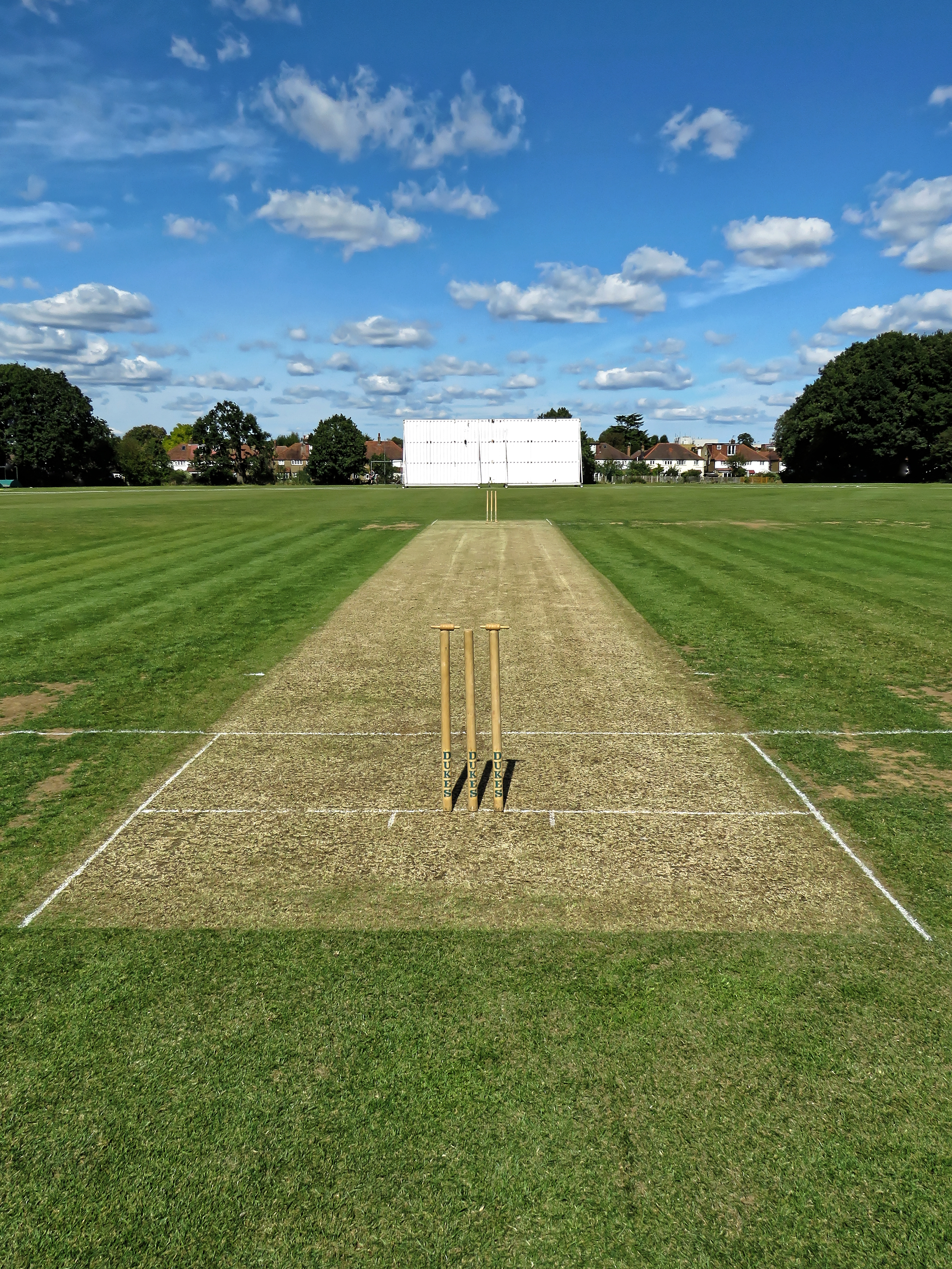
A cricket pitch in the centre of the field with a sight screen in the distance.

A cricket pitch is the rectangular central strip of a cricket field between the two wickets, where most of the action takes place. It is 22 yd (20.12 m) long (1 chain) and 10 ft (3.05 m) wide, and has specific markings delineating the creases, as specified by the Laws of Cricket. The surface is flat and is normally covered with extremely short grass, but can be completely dry or dusty soil with barely any grass or, in some circumstances (that are rarely seen in high level cricket), made from an artificial material. During a cricket match, the pitch is never altered or repaired, other than special circumstances that may change the condition. Any grass on the pitch at the start of the game, for example, may disappear due to wear.

As almost all deliveries bowled will bounce off the pitch towards the batter, the state and type of a cricket pitch can significantly affect the outcome of a match. The state of the pitch is so important that home teams can be fined or docked points if it is deemed unfit for normal play or dangerous for batters, with balls behaving unpredictably. Players may also face disciplinary action if found deliberately damaging or altering the pitch in violation of the Laws of Cricket. Because of these factors, coaches, players, and commentators often discuss how the pitch is "behaving" during a match—especially in first-class cricket or Test cricket, where conditions can change over several days. These changes also influence the coin toss decision, as captains weigh whether batting first or bowling first is more advantageous. For example, a captain might choose to bat first on a flat pitch but opt to bowl on a greener, more moist surface that offers early movement and more pace.

== Development ==
In 1620, Gunter's chain, measuring 22 yards long, was introduced for purposes of land survey. It was designed by English mathematician Edmund Gunter (1581–1626). Gunter's chain was probably adopted at a very early stage by cricketers for measuring the length of the pitch. The pitch length was specified as a mandatory 22 yards in the first known code of the Laws of Cricket in 1744, and it must have been a firmly-established rule long before then. Having a set length probably enabled cricketers to determine other rules which are related to the pitch.

Pitches were uncovered through the early history of the sport, and they soon deteriorated as a match progressed. An important innovation took place c. 1895 when marl began to be used in pitch preparation. Marl has a binding effect on soil, enabling pitches to last much longer than before.

== Creases and dimensions ==
Cricket pitch, with dimensions

See crease (cricket) and run (cricket) for the essentials.

The rectangular central area of the cricket field – the space used for pitches – is known as the square. Cricket pitches are usually oriented as close to the north–south direction as practical, because the low afternoon sun would be dangerous for a batter facing due west.

The pitch is 22 yd (20.12 m) long (1 chain) and 10 ft (3.05 m) wide,

The word wicket often occurs in reference to the pitch. Although technically incorrect according to the Laws of Cricket (Law 6 covers the pitch and Law 8 the wickets, distinguishing between them), cricket players, followers, and commentators persist in the usage, with context eliminating any possible ambiguity. Track or deck are other synonyms for pitch.

== Protected area ==
The protected area is the central portion of the pitch – a rectangle running down the middle of the pitch, two feet wide, and beginning five feet from each popping crease. Under the Laws of Cricket, a bowler must avoid running on this area during their follow-through after delivering the ball, unless they need to field the ball.

If a bowler runs on the protected area without due cause, an umpire will issue a warning to the bowler and to their team captain. The umpire issues a second and final warning if the bowler transgresses again. On the third offence, the umpire will eject the bowler from the attack, and the bowler may not bowl again for the remainder of the innings. (NB: check citations)

== State of the pitch ==
A perspective view of the cricket pitch from the bowler's end. The bowler runs in past one side of the wicket, delivering either "over" or "round" the wicket.

The state of the pitch is so important that home teams can be fined or docked points if it is deemed unfit for normal play or dangerous for batters, with balls behaving unpredictably. Players may also face disciplinary action if found deliberately damaging or altering the pitch in violation of the Laws of Cricket.

A natural pitch with grass longer or more moist than usual is described as a green pitch, green top, or green seamer. Such surfaces favour the bowler because the ball can move unpredictably off the seam and through the air.

A sticky wicket—a pitch that has become wet and is drying rapidly in hot sun—also causes the ball to behave erratically, particularly assisting slower or spin bowlers. Modern first-class pitches are usually protected from rain and dew, so true sticky wickets are now rare.

A dusty and very dry pitch often favours spin bowling because the ball grips more on such surfaces, giving the team with stronger spin bowlers a potential advantage.

As a multi-day match progresses, the pitch naturally dries. The Laws of Cricket prohibit watering during play, so cracks and dust often appear. Initially batting becomes easier as early moisture disappears, but later the surface may crumble into a dust bowl or minefield, again favouring spin bowlers who can extract sharp turn. A surface producing significant turn is called a turner—or, when extreme, a raging turner.

Because these changes alter the relative difficulty of batting and bowling, captains weigh expected pitch behaviour carefully when deciding—after winning the coin toss—whether to bat or bowl first.

=== Pitch condition ===
Pitches in different parts of the world have different characteristics. The nature of the pitch plays an important role in the actual game: it may have a significant influence on team selection and other aspects. Pitches in hot and dry climates or seasons tend to have less grass on them, making batting easier. Batters or bowlers can have different levels of success based on the region they are in, and this is partially due to variation in pitches. As the pitch deteriorates throughout a match, this can also have considerable influence on the success or failure of a team's bowling or batting efforts.

=== Pitch safety ===
Certain conditions, as set out by the ICC, must be met to ensure that a pitch is fit and safe to play on. If the pitch is found to excessively favour one side, or if other conditions cause it to be dangerous, the match may, after agreement between the captains and the umpires, be abandoned and possibly rescheduled.

== Preparation and maintenance of the playing area ==
Law 9 of the Laws of Cricket sets out rules covering the preparation and maintenance of the playing area.

=== Uncovered pitches ===
Cricket was originally played on uncovered pitches, meaning that the playing surface was fully exposed to the weather. Such pitches often produced unpredictable bounce and sharp turn after rain, giving bowlers a considerable advantage. The move towards routinely covering pitches began gradually and was largely completed by the 1960s.

==== Covering the pitch ====
A pitch is said to be covered when groundskeepers place protective sheets or covers over it to guard against rain or dew. The use or non-use of covers significantly affects how the ball comes off the surface, which can be contentious because even small changes in moisture alter bounce and pace.

Law 11 of the Laws of Cricket states that during a match the pitch shall not be completely covered unless otherwise agreed before the toss. When possible, the bowlers' run-ups are also covered in wet conditions to maintain safety. Covers are removed as early as conditions allow on any day that play is expected. Excess water can be cleared from the pitch or outfield with a machine known as a water hog.

=== Rolling the pitch ===
During a match, the captain of the batting side may request that the pitch be rolled for up to seven minutes before the start of each innings (other than the first) and before the beginning of each subsequent day's play. If the start of the first innings is delayed after the toss, the batting captain may also request rolling unless the umpires decide the delay has not altered the surface. If more than one roller is available, the batting captain chooses which to use. Regulations aim to prevent unnecessary delays but guarantee the captain's right to the allotted rolling time. Rolling compresses the soil, reducing moisture and changing pace or bounce, and can therefore favour either batter or bowler depending on conditions.

For the 2010 County Championship season, use of the heavy roller was banned because it was believed to create excessively flat pitches and contribute to drawn matches.

=== Sweeping ===
Before a pitch is rolled it is first swept to avoid any possible damage caused by rolling in debris. The pitch is also cleared of any debris at all intervals for meals, between innings and at the beginning of each day. The only exception to this is that the umpires do not allow sweeping to take place where they consider it may be detrimental to the surface of the pitch.

=== Mowing ===
Groundskeepers mow the pitch on each day of a match on which play is expected to take place. Once a game has begun, mowings take place under the supervision of the umpires.

=== Footholes and footholds ===
The umpires are required to make sure that bowlers' and batter's footholes are cleaned out and dried whenever necessary to facilitate play. In matches of more than one day's duration, if necessary, the footholes made by the bowler in his delivery stride may be returfed or covered with quick-setting fillings to make them safe and secure. Players may also secure their footholes using sawdust provided that the pitch is not damaged or they do not do so in a way that is unfair to the other team.

=== Research ===
England is the hub for considerable research in the preparation of cricket pitches, with Cranfield University working with the ECB and The Institute of Groundsmanship (IOG).

== Drop-in pitches ==
A drop-in pitch is a pitch that is prepared away from the ground or venue in which it is used, and "dropped" into place for a match to take place. This allows multi-purpose venues to host other sports and events with more versatility than a dedicated cricket ground would allow. Much like an integral pitch, a quality drop-in pitch takes several years to cultivate, grounds would maintain and utilise each drop-in pitch over multiple seasons, and pitches can deteriorate over many years to the point that they need to be retired.

They were first developed by WACA curator John Maley for use in the World Series Cricket matches, set up in the 1970s by Australian businessman Kerry Packer. Drop-in pitches became necessary for the World Series as they had to play in dual purpose venues operating outside of the cricket establishment. Along with other revolutions during the series including the white ball, floodlights, helmets, and coloured clothing, drop-in pitches were designed to also make games more interesting. They would start off bowler friendly seaming and spinning with uneven bounce for the first two days of a game. After that they became extremely easy for batting meaning high targets were chaseable on the fourth and fifth days, although there would still be something in the pitch for the bowlers.

In 2005, the Brisbane Cricket Ground (the "Gabba") rejected the use of a drop-in pitch, despite requests from the ground's other users, the Brisbane Lions AFL team. Although drop-in pitches are regularly used in the Melbourne Cricket Ground and in New Zealand, Queensland Cricket stated that Brisbane's weather and the difference in performance meant they preferred to prepare the ground in the traditional way.

== Artificial pitches ==
In amateur matches in some parts of the world, artificial pitches are sometimes used. These can be a slab of concrete overlaid with a coir mat or artificial turf. Sometimes dirt is put over the coir mat to provide an authentic feeling pitch. Artificial pitches are rare in professional cricket, being used only when exhibition matches are played in regions where cricket is not a common sport.

== Bibliography ==
- Bowen, Rowland (1970). Cricket: A History of its Growth and Development. London: Eyre & Spottiswoode. ISBN 978-04-13278-60-9.
- Morris, Steve (2025). Early cricket—a chronology. Craven Books (limited edition, by subscription only). [ISBN unspecified]
