= George Jobey =

English footballer and manager (1885-1962)

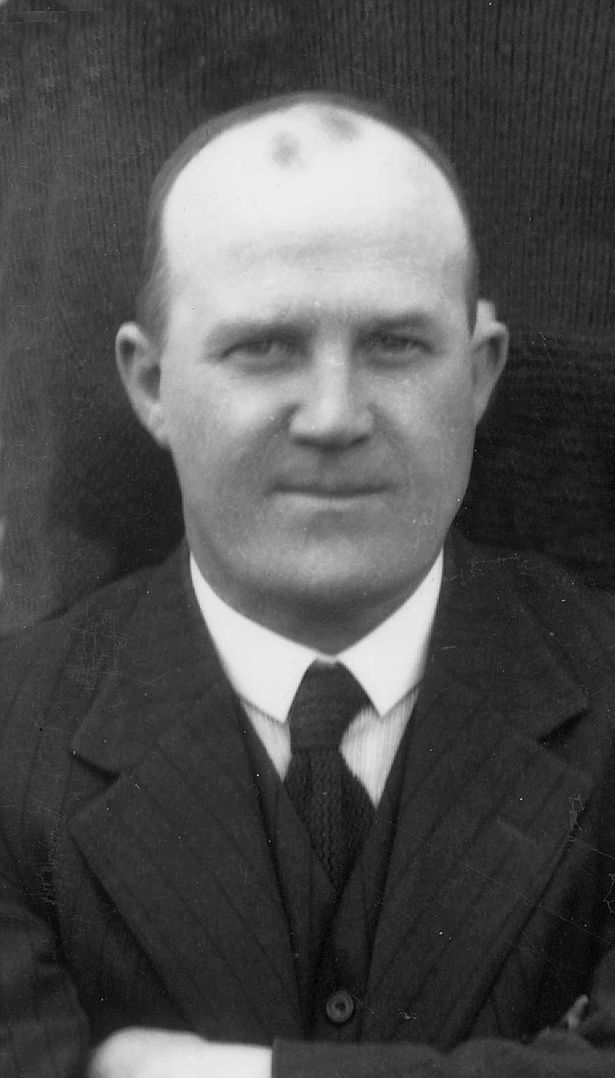

Personal information
- Date of birth: July 1885
- Place of birth: Heddon, near Newcastle-upon-Tyne, England
- Date of death: 9 May 1962 (aged 76)
- Place of death: Derby, England
- Height: 5 ft 8 1/2 in (1.74 m)
- Position: Defender

Youth career
- Morpeth Harriers

Senior career*
Years	Team	Apps	(Gls)
1906–1913	Newcastle United		
1913–1914	Woolwich Arsenal		
1914–1915	Bradford Park Avenue		
1915–1918	Hamilton Academical		
1918–1920	Leicester City		
1920–1922	Northampton Town		

Managerial career
- 1920–1922: Northampton Town (player-manager)
- 1922–1924: Wolverhampton Wanderers
- 1925–1941: Derby County
- 1952–1953: Mansfield Town
- * Club domestic league appearances and goals

George Jobey (July 1885 – 9 May 1962) was an English football player and manager. He won the league championship as a player with his hometown club Newcastle United.

== Career ==
Jobey was born in 1885 in Heddon, Newcastle-upon-Tyne, (Note: Births Sep 1885 Jobey George Castle W. 10b 282) and played football for local boys' clubs in Morpeth before joining Newcastle United in 1906. He made his senior debut on 20 April 1907 in a 4–2 loss at Bolton Wanderers.

He spent seven seasons with the Magpies but only played 53 matches, mostly playing at centre or right half; however, he played enough times to win a First Division winner's medal in 1908–09 and also picked up a runners-up medal in the 1911 FA Cup Final; Newcastle lost 1–0 in a replay to Bradford City after a goalless first match.

Jobey was transferred to Woolwich Arsenal in May 1913, and made an immediate impact. On 6 September 1913, Arsenal faced Leicester Fosse in their very first match at their new Arsenal Stadium in Highbury. After Leicester's Tommy Benfield had become the first player to score at the new stadium, Jobey joined him in the record books as the first Arsenal player to do so, heading home just before half-time. In the second half, he was injured and so became the first player to be stretchered off at Highbury.

He played 28 league matches that season before being transferred during the close season to Bradford Park Avenue. He only spent a single season at Bradford before World War I intervened and the Football League was suspended. He served in the Royal Garrison Artillery and played for Scottish club Hamilton Academical during the conflict, before moving to Leicester City after hostilities ended.

Jobey then became player-manager of Northampton Town in 1920, as the club became founder members of the Third Division. He achieved two mid table finished before quitting the game in April 1922 to become a hotelier.

He was tempted back into the game five months later to become manager of Wolverhampton Wanderers. His first season at Molineux proved a struggle and the club slipped down to the Third Division for the first time in their history. The following season saw an immediate return though as they won the 1923–24 Third Division (North) title.

However, he again dropped out of the game though after this success, returning to running a hotel. In 1925, he returned to football when he was appointed manager of Derby County. He was an immediate success, leading them to promotion in 1925–26 and twice securing runners-up place in the First Division, in 1929–30 and 1935–36. Derby toured Nazi Germany with Jobey as manager in 1934.

In 1941, he was accused of making illegal payments to players, as an inducement for them to sign for Derby; a Football Association inquiry found him guilty and banned him from football for life. Jobey's suspension was lifted in 1945, but apart from a year in charge of Mansfield Town between 1952 and 1953, he remained out of the game.

He died in hospital in Derby on 9 May 1962, aged 76.

== Honours ==
Newcastle United (as player)

- Football League championship: 1908–09
- FA Cup runner-up: 1911

Wolverhampton Wanderers

- Third Division championship: 1923–24
