= Water hog =

Sports ground maintenance machine

A water hog is a machine that removes water from sports grounds. The water hog was invented by Hugh McLaughlin.

Driven by a rider, it has a wide, front roller that absorbs the water, transfers it to a storage tank, and allows it to be discharged in a safe location. Some water hogs can suck off excess water at a rate of 200 gallons per minute and throw it as far as 100 feet away from the machine. It is designed so that it will not damage the turf.

Originally devised for use on cricket pitches, it is now used at a wide range of sporting venues including golf putting greens, football grounds, American football stadiums, and at gaelic football stadiums where it has proved very successful.

== Incidents ==
The water hog at the Taunton cricket ground failed, in May 2006, delaying the start of the Somerset v Hampshire C&G Trophy match, which was subsequently abandoned.
