= Emirates Stadium =

Football stadium in Holloway, London, England

- Ashburton Grove

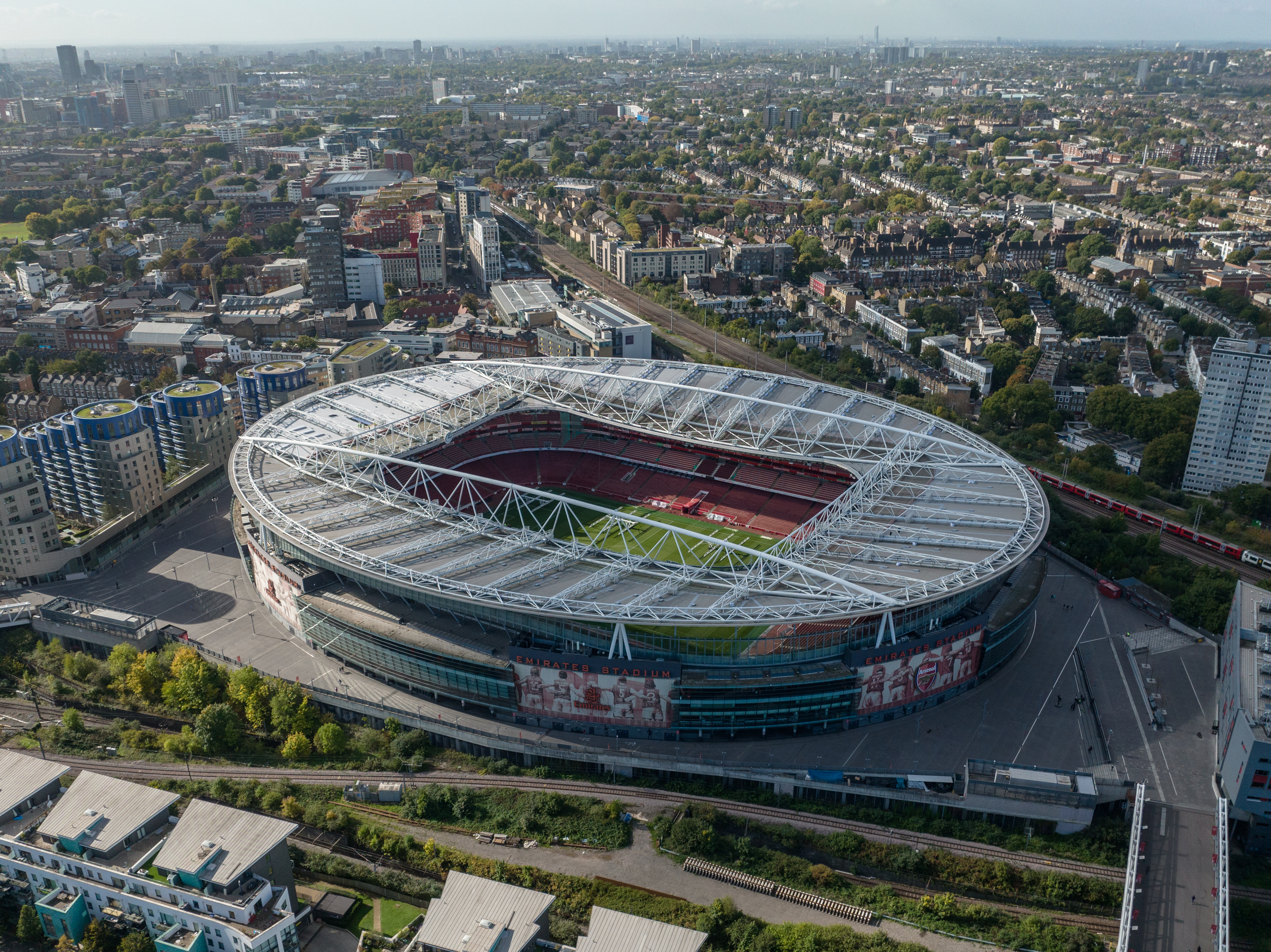
- UEFA
- Interactive map of Emirates Stadium
- Address: Hornsey Road
- Location: Holloway, London, England; N7 7AJ
- Coordinates: 51°33′18″N 0°6′30″W
- Owner: Kroenke Sports & Entertainment
- Capacity: 60,704
- Executive suites: 152
- Surface: GrassMaster
- Record attendance: 60,383 (Arsenal vs Liverpool, 27 October 2024)
- Field size: 105 by 68 metres (114.8 yd × 74.4 yd)

Construction
- Groundbreaking: February 2004
- Opened: 22 July 2006
- Cost: £390 million (2004)
- Architect: HOK Sport (Populous since 2009)
- Structural engineer: BuroHappold
- Services engineer: BuroHappold
- General contractor: Sir Robert McAlpine

Tenants
- Arsenal (2006–present); Arsenal Women (2024–present)

The Emirates Stadium (known as Arsenal Stadium for UEFA competitions) is a football stadium in Holloway, London, England. It has been the home stadium of Arsenal Football Club since its completion in 2006. Arsenal's women's team made the stadium their home in 2024. It has a current seated capacity of 60,704, making it one of the largest football stadiums in England by capacity.

In 1997, Arsenal explored the possibility of relocating to a new stadium, having been denied planning permission by Islington Council to expand its home stadium, Highbury. After considering various options (including purchasing Wembley Stadium), the club bought an industrial and waste disposal estate in Ashburton Grove in 2000. A year later, they received the council's approval to build a stadium on the site; manager Arsène Wenger described this as the "biggest decision in Arsenal's history" since the board appointed Herbert Chapman in the 1920s. Relocation plans began in 2002, but financial difficulties delayed work until 2004. Emirates was later announced as the main sponsor for the stadium. The entire stadium project was completed in 2006 at a cost of £390 million. The club's former stadium was redeveloped as Highbury Square, an apartment complex.

The quality of Arsenal's pitch and groundsmanship have been recognised internationally and led to it being nicknamed "the Carpet" by matchgoing fans and the wider sports media. Since 2009, the stadium has undergone a process of "Arsenalisation" with an aim of restoring visible links to Arsenal's history. The stadium hosts international football fixtures (including often acting as a de facto ground of the Brazil national team in Europe), as well as hosting international music acts on a regular basis.

== History ==
=== Background ===
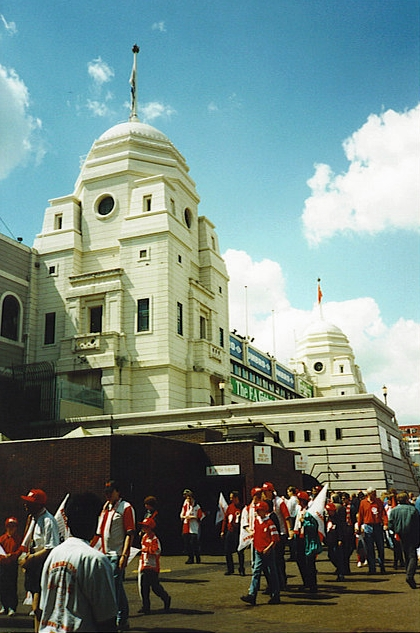
Wembley Stadium was one of the sites Arsenal considered relocating to.

Spectator safety at football grounds was a major concern during the 1980s, following incidents of hooliganism, and disasters such as the Bradford City stadium fire and the Heysel Stadium disaster in 1985, and the Hillsborough disaster in 1989. The Taylor Report into the Hillsborough tragedy was finalised in January 1990 and recommended the removal of terraces (standing areas) in favour of seating.

Under the amended Football Spectators Act 1989, it became compulsory for first and second tier English clubs to have their stadia all-seated in time for the 1994–95 season. Arsenal, like many other clubs, experienced difficulty raising income for converted terraced areas. At the end of the 1990–91 season, the club introduced a bond scheme which offered supporters the right to purchase a season ticket at its renovated North Bank stand of Highbury. The board felt this was the only viable option after considering other proposals; they did not want to compromise on traditions nor curb manager George Graham's transfer dealings. At a price of between £1,000 to £1,500, the 150-year bond was criticised by supporters, who argued it potentially blocked the participation of those less well-off from supporting Arsenal. A campaign directed by the Independent Arsenal Supporters' Association brought relative success as only a third of all bonds were sold.

The North Bank was the final stand to be refurbished. It opened in August 1993 at a cost of £20 million. The rework significantly reduced the stadium's capacity, from 57,000 at the beginning of the decade to under 40,000. High ticket prices to serve the club's existing debts and low attendance figures forced Arsenal to explore the possibility of building a larger stadium in 1997. The club wanted to attract an evergrowing fanbase and financially compete with the biggest clubs in England. By comparison, Manchester United enjoyed a rise in gate receipts; the club went from £43.9 million in 1994 to £87.9 million in 1997 because of Old Trafford's expansion.

Arsenal's initial proposal to rebuild Highbury was met with disapproval from local residents, as it required the demolition of 25 neighbouring houses. It later became problematic once the East Stand of the stadium was granted Grade II listing in July 1997. After much consultation, the club abandoned its plan, deciding a capacity of 48,000 was not large enough. Arsenal then investigated the possibility of relocating to Wembley Stadium and in March 1998 made an official bid to purchase the ground. The Football Association (FA) and the English National Stadium Trust opposed Arsenal's offer, claiming it harmed England's bid for the 2006 FIFA World Cup, which FIFA itself denied. In April 1998, Arsenal withdrew its bid and Wembley was purchased by the English National Stadium Trust. The club however was given permission to host its UEFA Champions League home ties at Wembley for the 1998–99 and 1999–2000 seasons. Although Arsenal's time in the competition was brief, twice exiting the group stages, the club set its record home attendance (73,707 against Lens) and earned record gate income in the 1998–99 season, highlighting potential profitability.

=== Site selection and development proposals ===
In November 1999, Arsenal examined the feasibility of building a new stadium in Ashburton Grove. Anthony Spencer, estate agent and club property adviser, recommended the area to director Danny Fiszman and vice-chairman David Dein having scoured over North London for potential areas. The land, 450 metres (490 yd) from Highbury was composed of a rubbish processing plant and industrial estate, 80% owned to varying levels by Islington Council, Railtrack and Sainsbury's. After passing the first significant milestone at Islington Council's planning committee, Arsenal submitted a planning application for a new-build 60,000 seater stadium in November 2000. This included a redevelopment project at Drayton Park, converting the existing ground Highbury to flats and building a new waste station in Lough Road. As part of the scheme, Arsenal intended to create 1,800 new jobs for the community and 2,300 new homes. Improvements to three railway stations, Holloway Road, Drayton Park and Finsbury Park, were included to cope with the increased capacity requirements from matchday crowds.

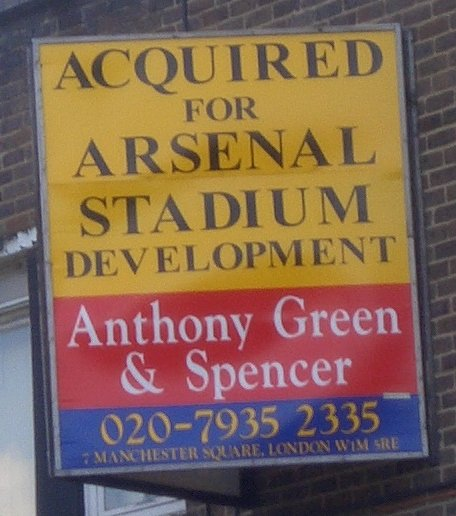
A board displaying the acquisition of the Ashburton Grove site for the stadium development

Islington Stadium Communities Alliance (ISCA) – an alliance of 16 groups representing local residents and businesses, was set up in January 2000 as a body against the redevelopment. Alison Carmichael, a spokeswoman for the group, said of the move, "It may look like Arsenal are doing great things for the area, but in its detail the plan is awful. We blame the council; the football club just wants to expand to make more money." Tom Lamb, an ISCA member, was concerned about as air pollution and growing traffic, adding "that is a consequence which most Arsenal fans would never see, because they are in Islington only for about thirty days a year."

Seven months after the planning application was submitted, a poll showed that 75% of respondents (2,133 residents) were against the scheme. By October 2001, the club asserted that a poll of Islington residents found that 70% were in favour, and received the backing from the then Mayor of London, Ken Livingstone. The club launched a campaign to aid the project in the run up to Christmas and planted the slogan "Let Arsenal support Islington" on advertising hoardings and in the backdrop of manager Arsène Wenger's press conferences.

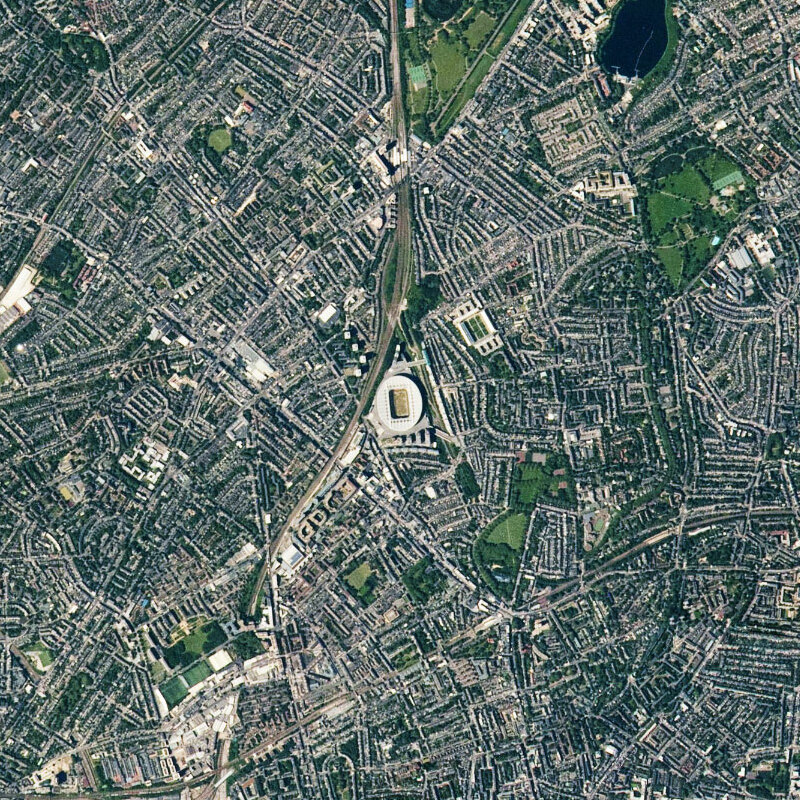
The Ashburton Grove site in North London, with the completed Emirates Stadium. Arsenal's former home Highbury Stadium can be seen north-east of the newer stadium.

Islington Council approved Arsenal's planning application on 10 December 2001, voting in favour of the Ashburton Grove development. The council also consented to the transfer of the existing waste recycling plant in Ashburton Grove to Lough Road. Livingstone approved the plans a month later, and it was then motioned to then-Transport Secretary Stephen Byers, who initially delayed making a final decision. He had considered whether to refer the scheme to a public inquiry, but eventually decided not to. Planning permission was granted by Islington Council in May 2002, but local residents and ISCA launched a late challenge to the High Court, arguing the plans were against the law. Duncan Ouseley dismissed the case in July 2002, paving the way for Arsenal to start work.

The club succeeded in a further legal challenge bought by small firms in January 2005 as the High Court upheld a decision by then-Deputy Prime Minister John Prescott to grant a compulsory purchase order in support of the scheme. The stadium later became issue in the local elections in May 2006. The Metropolitan Police restricted supporters' coaches to being parked in the nearby Sobel Sports Centre rather than in the underground stadium car park, and restricted access to 14 streets on match days. These police restrictions were conditions of the stadiums' health and safety certificate which the stadium requires to operate and open. The road closures were passed at a council meeting in July 2005.

=== Finance and naming ===
Securing finance for the stadium project proved a challenge as Arsenal received no public subsidy from the government. Whereas Wenger claimed French clubs "pay nothing at all for their stadium, nothing at all for their maintenance", and "Bayern Munich paid one euro for their ground", Arsenal were required to buy the site outright in one of London's most expensive areas. The club therefore sought other ways of generating income, such as making a profit on player trading. Arsenal recouped over £50 million from transfers involving Nicolas Anelka to Real Madrid, and Marc Overmars and Emmanuel Petit to Barcelona. The transfer of Anelka partly funded the club's new training ground, in London Colney, which opened in October 1999.

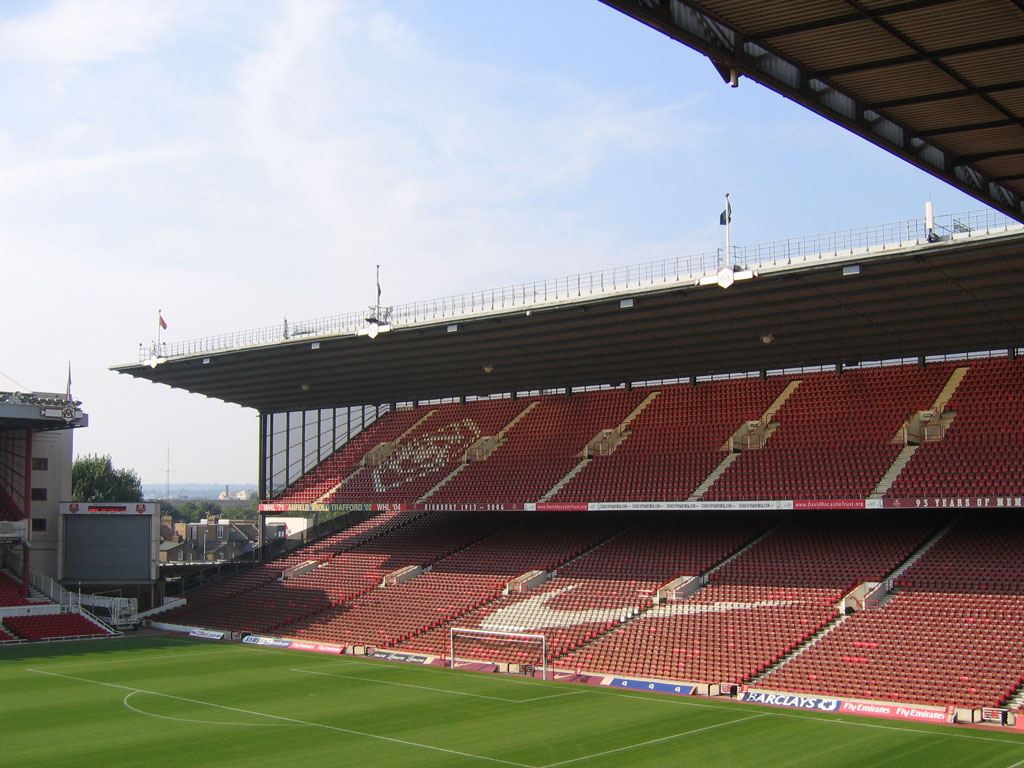
Arsenal organised another bond scheme in order to generate funds for the new stadium and redevelopment of Highbury.

The club also agreed new sponsorship deals. In September 2000, Granada Media Group purchased a 5% stake in Arsenal for £47 million. As part of the acquisition, Granada became the premier media agent for Arsenal, handling advertising, sponsorship, merchandising, publishing and licensing agreements. The club's managing director Keith Edelman confirmed in a statement that the investment would be used directly to fund for the new stadium. The collapse of ITV Digital (part-owned by Granada) in April 2002 coincided with news that the company was tied in to pay £30 million once arrangements for the new stadium were finalised.

In September 2002, Arsenal formulated plans to reduce its players' wage bill after making a pre-tax loss of £22.3 million for the 2001–02 financial year. The club appointed N M Rothschild & Sons to examine its financial situation and advise whether it was feasible for construction to press ahead at the end of March 2003. Although Arsenal secured a £260 million loan from a group of banks led by the Royal Bank of Scotland, the club suspended work on Ashburton Grove in April 2003, saying, "We have experienced a number of delays in arrangements for our new stadium project in recent months across a range of issues. The impact of these delays is that we will now be unable to deliver a stadium opening for the start of the 2005–06 season." The cost of building the stadium, forecasted at £400 million, had risen by £100 million during that period.

Throughout the summer of 2003, Arsenal gave fans the opportunity to register their interest in a relaunched bond scheme. The club planned to issue 3,000 bonds for between £3,500 and £5,000 each for a season ticket at Highbury, then at Ashburton Grove. Supporters reacted negatively to the news; AISA chairman Steven Powell said in a statement: "We are disappointed that the club has not consulted supporters before announcing a new bond scheme." Though Arsenal never stated how many bonds were sold, they did raise several million pounds through the scheme. The club also extended its contract with sportswear provider Nike, in a deal worth £55 million over seven years. Nike paid a minimum of £1 million each year as a royalty payment, contingent on sales.

Funding for the stadium was secured in February 2004. Later in the year Emirates bought naming rights for the stadium, in a 15-year deal estimated at £100 million that also included a 7-year shirt sponsorship, starting in the 2006–07 season. Emirates and Arsenal agreed to a new deal worth £150 million in November 2012, and shirt-sponsorship was extended to five years while naming rights were extended to 2028; a further extension of the shirt sponsorship rights was announced in August 2023, also taking that deal through 2028.

The stadium name is colloquially shortened from "Emirates Stadium" to "The Emirates", although some supporters continue to use the former name "Ashburton Grove" or "The Grove" to refer to the stadium, particularly by those who object to the concept of corporate sponsorship of stadium names. Due to UEFA regulations on stadium sponsors, the ground is referred to as Arsenal Stadium for European matches, which was also the official name of Highbury.

=== Construction and opening ===
Actual construction of the stadium began once Arsenal secured funding. The club appointed Sir Robert McAlpine in January 2002 to carry out building work and the stadium was designed by Populous, who were the architects for Stadium Australia (home of the 2000 Olympics and the South Sydney Rabbitohs NRL club) and the redevelopment of Ascot Racecourse. Construction consultants Arcadis and engineering firm Buro Happold were also involved in the process.

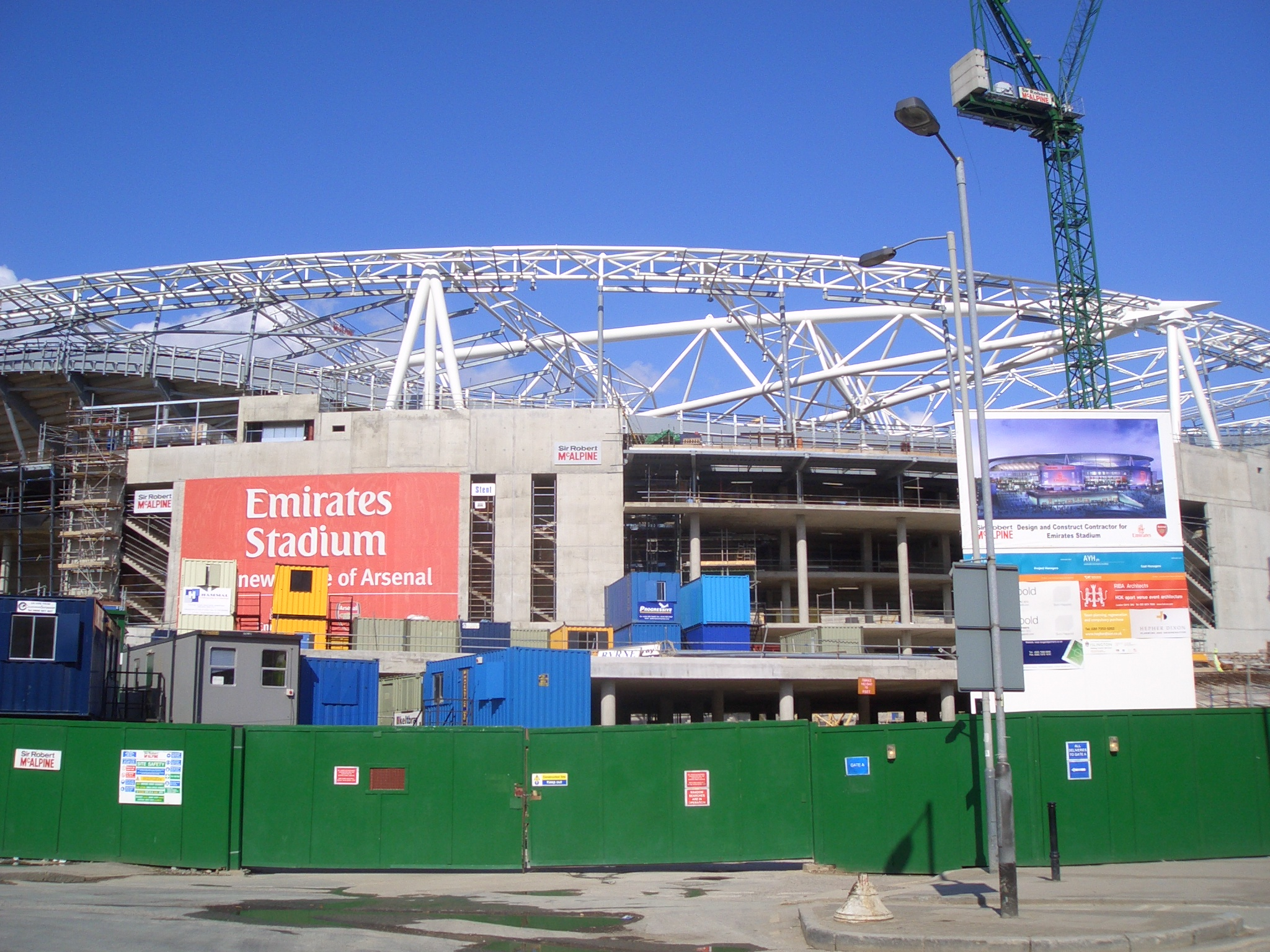
The Emirates Stadium under construction in May 2005

The first phase of demolition was completed by March 2004, and two months later, stand pilings on the West, East and North stands had been concluded. Two bridges over the Northern City railway line connecting the stadium to Drayton Park were also built; these were completed in August 2004. The stadium topped out in August 2005 and external glazing, power and water tank installation was completed by December 2005. The first seat in the new stadium was ceremonially installed on 13 March 2006 by Arsenal midfielder Abou Diaby. DD GrassMaster was selected as the pitch installer and Hewitt Sportsturf was contracted to design and construct the playing field. Floodlights were successfully tested for the first time on 25 June 2006, and a day later, the goalposts were erected.

In order to obtain the licences needed to open, the Emirates Stadium hosted three non-full capacity events. The first "ramp-up" event was a shareholder open day on 18 July 2006, the second an open training session for 20,000 selected club members held two days later. The third event was Dennis Bergkamp's testimonial match against Ajax on 22 July 2006. The Emirates Stadium was officially opened by Prince Philip, Duke of Edinburgh on 26 October 2006; his wife Queen Elizabeth II had suffered a back injury and was unable to carry out her duty. Prince Philip quipped to the crowd, "Well, you may not have my wife, but you've got the second-most experienced plaque unveiler in the world." The royal visit echoed the attendance of the Queen's uncle, the Prince of Wales (later King Edward VIII) at the official opening of Highbury's West Stand in 1932. As a result of the change of plan, the Queen extended to the club the honour of inviting the chairman, manager and first team to join her for afternoon tea at Buckingham Palace. Held on 15 February 2007, the engagement marked the first time a football club had been invited to the palace for such an event.

=== Loan repayments ===
Interest on the £260 million debt was set at a commercial fixed rate over a 14-year period. To refinance the cost, Arsenal planned to convert the money into a 30-year bond financed by banks. The proposed bond issue went ahead in July 2006. Arsenal issued £210 million worth of 13.5-year bonds with a spread of 52 basis points over government bonds and £50 million of 7.1-year bonds with a spread of 22 basis points over LIBOR. It was the first publicly marketed, asset-backed bond issue by a European football club. The effective interest rate on these bonds is 5.14% and 5.97%, respectively, and are due to be paid back over a 25-year period; the move to bonds has reduced the club's annual debt service cost to approximately £20 million a year. In September 2010, Arsenal announced that the Highbury Square development – one of the main sources of income to reduce the stadium debt – was now debt free and making revenue.

When Arsenal moved to the Emirates Stadium, the club prioritised repaying the loans over strengthening the playing squad. Arsenal's self-sustaining model relied heavily on qualifying for the UEFA Champions League; as Wenger recalled in 2016: "We had to be three years in the Champions League out of five and have an average of 54,000 people, and we didn't know we would be capable of that." The club sold several experienced players throughout the late 2000s and early 2010s and raised ticket prices, upsetting supporters who have called for change. Wenger took umbrage over criticism and revealed the bank loans were contingent on his commitment to the club: "The banks wanted the technical consistency to guarantee that we have a chance to pay [them] back. I did commit and I stayed and under very difficult circumstances. So for me to come back and on top of that [critics] reproach me for not having won the championship during that period it is a bit overboard." Wenger later described the stadium move as the toughest period of his life because of the restricted finances in place.

=== Arsenalisation ===
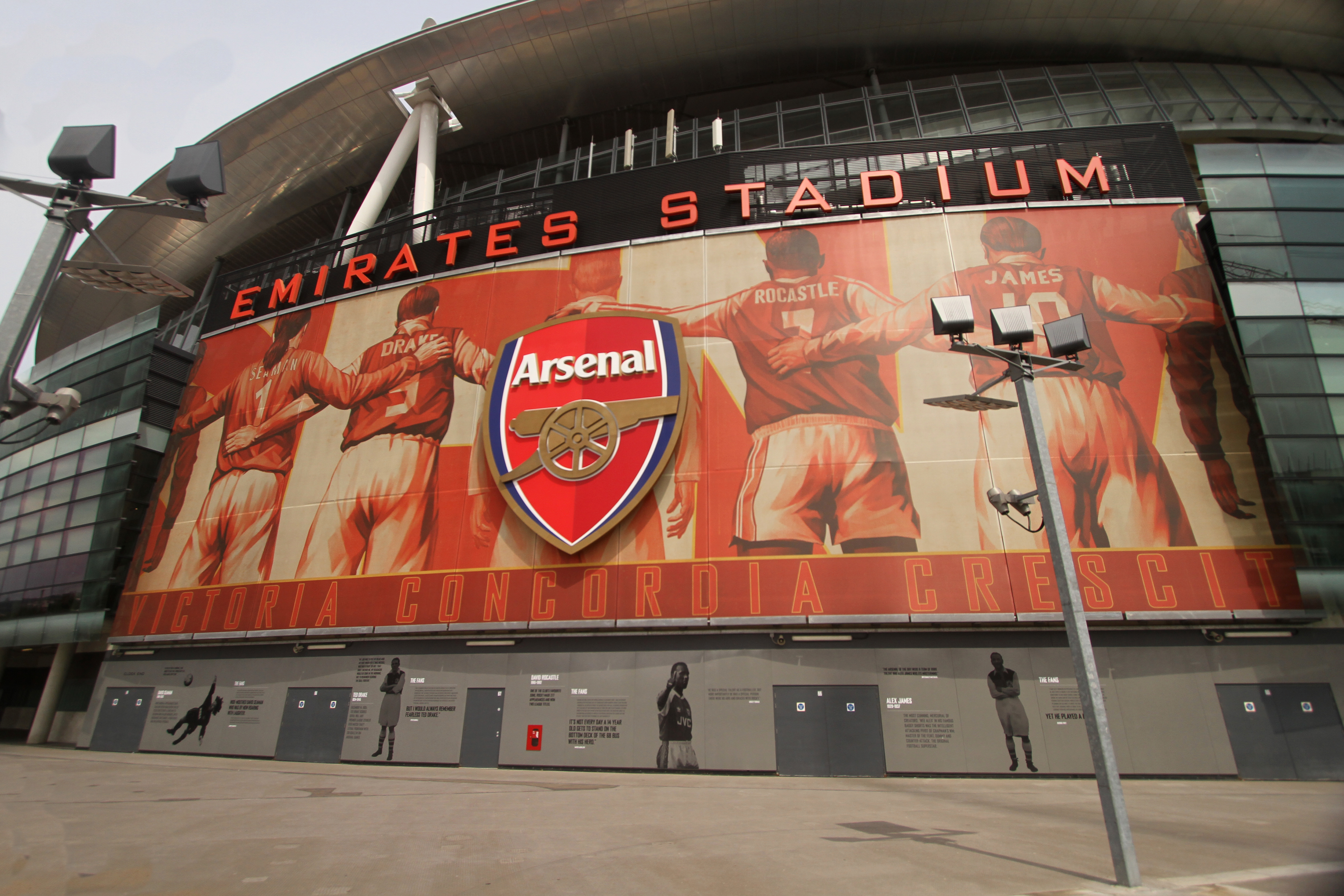
One of the murals installed on the stadium as a result of the Arsenalisation project

In August 2009, Arsenal began a programme of "Arsenalisation" of the Emirates Stadium after listening to feedback from supporters in a forum. The intention was to turn the stadium into a "visible stronghold of all things Arsenal through a variety of artistic and creative means", led by Arsenal chief executive Ivan Gazidis.

Among the first changes were white seats installed in the pattern of the club's trademark cannon, located in the lower level stands opposite the entrance tunnel. "The Spirit of Highbury", a shrine depicting every player to have played for Arsenal during its 93-year residence, was erected in late 2009 outside the stadium at the south end. Eight large murals on the exterior of the stadium were installed, each depicting four Arsenal legends linking arms, such that the effect of the completed design is 32 legends in a huddle embracing the stadium:

| Ian Wright | George Armstrong | David Jack | Martin Keown |
| Cliff Bastin | Tony Adams | Liam Brady | Thierry Henry |
| David Seaman | Ted Drake | David Rocastle | Alex James |
| Patrick Vieira | Reg Lewis | Lee Dixon | Joe Mercer |
| Dennis Bergkamp | Bob Wilson | Eddie Hapgood | Charlie George |
| Nigel Winterburn | David Danskin | Kenny Sansom | Jack Kelsey |
| Robert Pires | John Radford | David O'Leary | George Male |
| Ray Parlour | Frank McLintock | Steve Bould | Pat Rice |

Thierry Henry statue outside the stadium

Around the lower concourse of the stadium are additional murals depicting 12 "greatest moments" in Arsenal history, voted for by a poll on the club's website. Prior to the start of the 2010–11 season, Arsenal renamed the coloured seating quadrants of the ground as the East Stand, West Stand, North Bank, and Clock End. Akin to Highbury, this involved the installation of a clock above the newly renamed Clock End which was unveiled in a league match against Blackpool. In April 2011, Arsenal renamed two bridges near the stadium in honour of club directors Ken Friar and Danny Fiszman. As part of the club's 125 anniversary celebrations in December 2011, Arsenal unveiled three statues of former captain Tony Adams, record goalscorer Thierry Henry and manager Herbert Chapman outside of the stadium. Before Arsenal's match against Sunderland in February 2014, the club unveiled a statue of former striker Dennis Bergkamp, outside the west stand of Emirates Stadium.

Dennis Bergkamp statue outside the stadium

Banners and flags, often designed by supporters group REDaction, are hung around the ground. A large "49" flag, representing the record run of 49 unbeaten league games, is passed around the lower tier before kick off.

== Structure and facilities ==
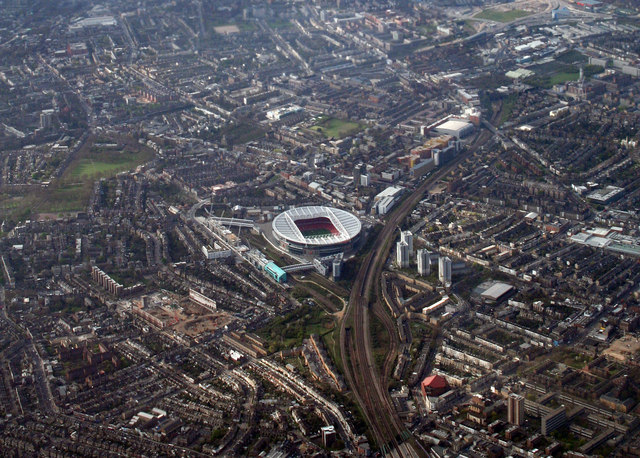
An aerial view of the Emirates Stadium and surrounding area, looking in a south-southwesterly direction. The site of Arsenal's former stadium Highbury, in the process of being redeveloped into Highbury Square, is visible northeast of the new stadium (below and to the left).

Described as "beautiful" and "intimidating" by architect Christopher Lee of Populous, the Emirates Stadium is a four-tiered bowl with translucent polycarbonate roofing over the stands, but not over the pitch. The underside is clad with metallic panels and the roof is supported by four triangular trusses, made of welded tubular steel. Two trusses span 200 metres (660 ft) in a north–south direction while a further two span an east–west direction. The trusses are supported by the stadium's vertical concrete cores, eight of which are connected to them by steel tripods. They in turn each house four stairways, a passenger lift as well as service access. Façades are either glazed or woven between the cores which allows visitors on the podium to see inside the stadium. The glass and steel construction was devised by Populous to give an impression that the stadium sparkles in sunlight and glows in the night.

The club briefing room

The upper and lower parts of the stadium feature standard seating. The stadium has two levels below ground that house its support facilities such as commercial kitchens, changing rooms and press and education centres. The main middle tier, known as the "Club Level", is premium priced and also includes the director's box. There are 7,139 seats at this level, which are sold on licences lasting from one to four years. Immediately above the club tier there is a small circle consisting of 150 boxes of 10, 12 and 15 seats. The total number of spectators at this level is 2,222. The high demand for tickets, as well as the relative wealth of their London fans, means revenue from premium seating and corporate boxes is nearly as high as the revenue from the entire stadium at Highbury.

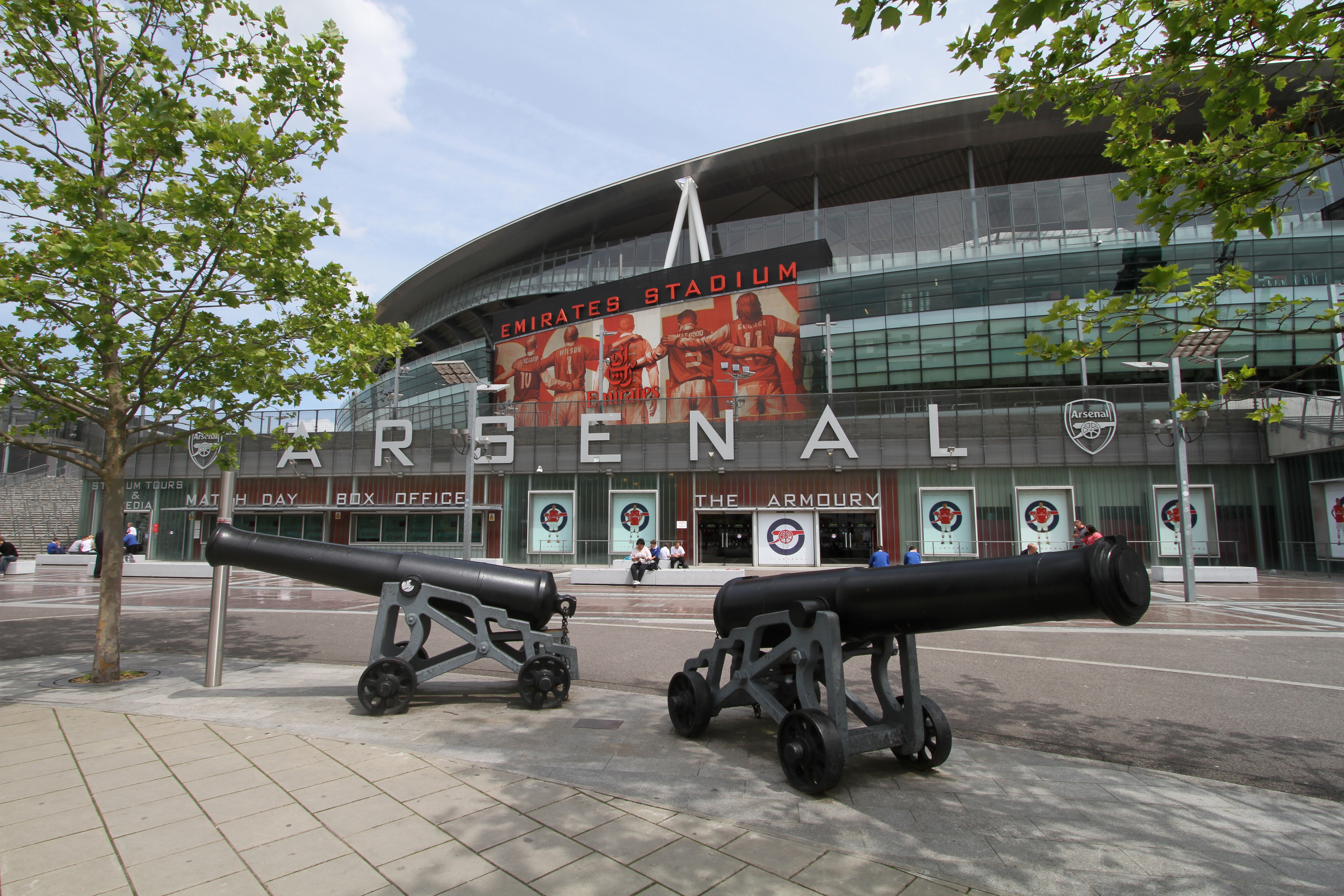
Cannons positioned outside the stadium

The upper tier is contoured to leave open space in the corners of the ground, and the roof is significantly canted inwards. Both of these features are meant to provide as much airflow and sunlight to the pitch as possible. Supporters in the upper tier on one side of the ground are unable to see supporters in the upper tier opposite. As part of a deal with Sony, the stadium was the first in the world to incorporate HDTV streaming. In the north-west and south-east corners of the stadium are two giant screens suspended from the roof.

Arsène Wenger bust

The pitch is 105 by 68 metres (115 by 74 yd) in size and the total grass area at Emirates is 113 by 76 metres (124 by 83 yd). Like Highbury, it runs north–south, with the players' tunnel and the dugouts on the west side of the pitch underneath the main TV camera. The quality of Arsenal's pitch and groundsmanship has been recognised internationally by bodies such as the Institute of Groundsmanship, and have led to the ground sometimes being referred to by players and fans as "The Carpet."

The away fans are found in the south-east corner of the lower tier. The away supporter configuration can be expanded from 1,500 seats to 4,500 seats behind the south goal in the lower tier, and a further 4,500 seats can be made available also in the upper tier, bringing the total to 9,000 supporters (the regulation 15% required for domestic cup competitions such as the FA Cup and EFL Cup). In total, the current seated capacity is 60,704, with future facilities in place which may allow future expansion of seats pending approval from regulatory bodies such as the Islington Council.

The club time capsule

The stadium additionally has facilities for fans with disabilities including a Guide Dog Toilet facility, a Disabled Supporters Match Day Lounge, Changing Places Toilet facilities which includes a hoist and changing table. In September 2017, Arsenal opened a sensory room at the stadium for the fans. There are 241 wheelchair accessible seats within the Emirates Stadium.

The Clock End on the club new stadium

The Emirates Stadium pays tribute to Arsenal's former home, Highbury. The club's offices are officially called Highbury House, located north-east of Emirates Stadium, and house the bust of Herbert Chapman that used to reside at Highbury. Three other busts that used to reside at Highbury of Claude Ferrier (architect of Highbury's East stand), Denis Hill-Wood (former Arsenal chairman) and manager Arsène Wenger have also been moved to Emirates Stadium and are in display in the entrance of the Diamond Club. Additionally, the clock that gave its name to the old Clock End has been resited on the new clock end which features a newer, larger replica of the clock. The Arsenal club museum, which was formerly held in the North Bank Stand, opened in October 2006 and is located to the north of the stadium, within the Northern Triangle building. It houses the marble statues that were once held in the marble halls of Highbury.

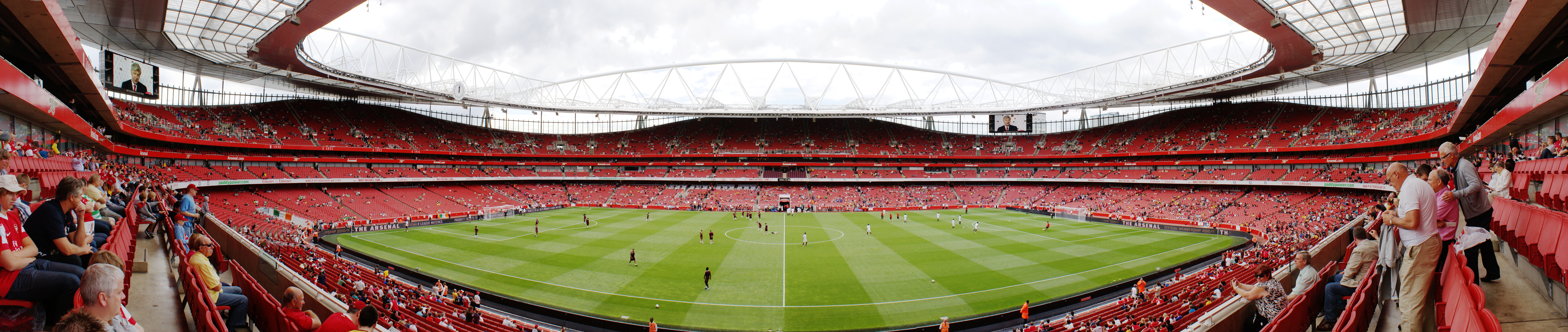
A panorama of players warming up from the east side

== Renovations ==
As of 2008, Arsenal's season ticket waiting list stood at 40,000 people. There has also been discussion on the implementation of safe standing.

In February 2022, the club announced major renovation plans to improve the Emirates Stadium. The first phase of renovations include installing new video boards, turnstile ticket readers, and refurbishing the stadium roof and wrap. Future renovation plans include completely overhauling the PA system and improving mobile connectivity within the stadium.

On 11 January 2023, Arsenal unveiled eight new pieces of artwork that would adorn the exterior of Emirates Stadium: Victoria Concordia Crescit, Remember Who You Are, Invincible, Come To See The Arsenal, Eighteen Eighty-Six, We All Follow The Arsenal, Future Brilliance, and Found a Place Where We Belong.

In October 2025, Arsenal stated that they were looking into increasing the capacity to 70,000 with changes to the seating gradient.

In May 2026, Arsenal announced they were putting together a plan to renovate the stadium. Later that year, on 6 August, Arsenal announced the renewal of their long-term partnership with Emirates, extending the agreement until 2033.

== Other uses ==
Aside from sporting uses, the Emirates Stadium operates as a conference centre. On 27 March 2008, it played host to a summit between British Prime Minister Gordon Brown and French President Nicolas Sarkozy, in part because the stadium was regarded as "a shining example of Anglo–French co-operation". The stadium has been used as a location for the audition stage of reality shows The X Factor, Britain's Got Talent and Big Brother. In 2016, the Emirates was a venue for Celebrity Masterchef, where contestants prepare meals for club staff members.

The Emirates has also been used as a music venue which increases the maximum capacity to 72,000. Bruce Springsteen and the E Street Band became the first band to play a concert at the stadium on 30 May 2008. They played a second gig the following night. British band Coldplay played three concerts at the Emirates in the June 2012, having sold out the first two dates within 30 minutes of going on sale. They were the first band to sell out the stadium for music purposes. Green Day set a gig attendance record when performing at the Emirates in June 2013. The Killers played 2 exclusive sold-out concerts at the Emirates for their Imploding the Mirage Tour on 3 and 4 June 2022. Robbie Williams played two concerts at the stadium on 6 and 7 June 2025 as part of his Britpop Tour.

== Records ==
It is difficult to get accurate attendance figures as Arsenal do not release these, but choose to use tickets sold. The average attendance for competitive first-team fixtures in the stadium's first season, 2006–07, was 59,837, with a Premier League average attendance of 60,045. By the 2016–17 season, the reported average home league attendance was 59,957. The attendances that Arsenal reported to the Metropolitan Police for the 2015–16 season show an average home match attendance of 54,918, ranging from a high of 60,007 against Aston Villa to a low of 44,878 against West Bromwich Albion. The highest attendance for an Arsenal match at the Emirates Stadium as of December 2022 is 60,383, for a Premier League match against Wolverhampton Wanderers on 2 November 2019. The lowest attendance at the ground is believed to be 25,909 for a match against FC BATE Borisov in the UEFA Europa League on 7 December 2017, however the official attendance for the game is recorded as 54,648.

The first player to score at the Emirates in a competitive fixture was Aston Villa defender Olof Mellberg after 53 minutes. In the same match Gilberto Silva scored Arsenal's first competitive goal at the ground. Jay Simpson was the first Arsenal player to score a hat trick at the Emirates Stadium against Cardiff City in February 2007, while Emmanuel Adebayor recorded Arsenal's 100th goal at the ground in January 2008 against Newcastle United. Arsenal's biggest margin of victory at the Emirates Stadium was by seven goals, achieved with a 7–0 win over Slavia Prague in the group stages of the UEFA Champions League on 23 October 2007. Their biggest margin of defeat at the ground was by four goals, when they were beaten 5–1 by Bayern Munich in the Champions League round of 16, second leg on 7 March 2017. Robin van Persie has scored the most goals at the Emirates Stadium with 64.

== Transport and access ==
A map of the Emirates Stadium and surrounding connections

The Emirates Stadium is served by a number of London Underground stations and bus routes. Arsenal station is the closest for the northern portion of the stadium accessed via the Ken Friar bridge, with Highbury & Islington station servicing the southern end. While Holloway Road station is the closest to the southern portion, it is entry-only before matches and exit-only afterwards to prevent overcrowding. Drayton Park station, adjacent to the Danny fiszman Bridge is shut on matchdays as the rail services to this station do not operate at weekends nor after 10 pm. £7.6 million was set aside in the planning permission for upgrading Drayton Park and Holloway Road; however Transport for London decided not to upgrade either station, in favour of improvement works at the interchanges at Highbury & Islington and Finsbury Park stations, both of which are served by Underground and National Rail services and are approximately a ten-minute walk away. The Emirates Stadium is the only football stadium that stands beside the East Coast Main Line between London and Edinburgh and is just over 2 miles from London King's Cross.

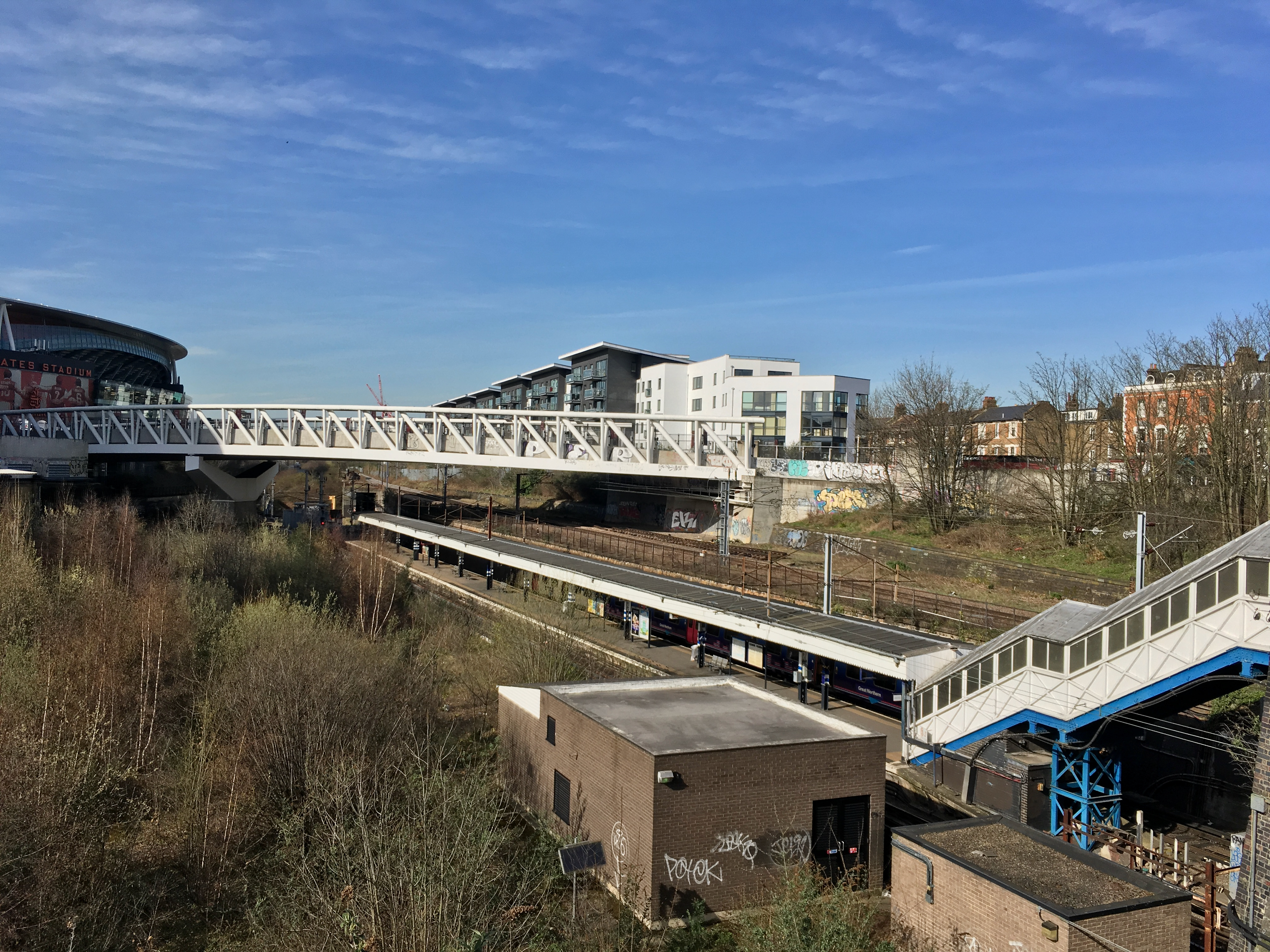
Footbridge over Drayton Park station, from Bryantwood Road in 2018.

Driving to the Emirates Stadium is strongly discouraged as there are strict matchday parking restrictions in operation around the stadium. An hour before kick-off to one hour after the final whistle there is a complete ban on vehicle movement on a number of the surrounding roads, except for Islington residents and businesses with a road closure access permit. The parking restrictions mean that the stadium is highly dependent on the Underground service, particularly when there is no overground service in operation.

The stadium opens to ticket holders two hours before kick-off. The main club shop, named 'The Armoury', and ticket offices are located near the West Stand, with other an additional store at the base of the North Bank Bridge, named 'All Arsenal' and the 'Arsenal Store' next to Finsbury Park station. Arsenal operates an electronic ticketing system where members of 'The Arsenal' (the club's fan membership scheme) use their membership cards to enter the stadium, thus removing the need for turnstile operators. Non-members are issued with one-off paper tickets embedded with an RFID tag allowing them to enter the stadium.
