= Tommy Benfield =

English footballer (1889–1918)

Personal information
- Full name: Thomas Charles Benfield
- Date of birth: 1889
- Place of birth: Leicester, England
- Date of death: 19 September 1918 (aged 29)
- Place of death: Somme, France
- Height: 5 ft 8 1/2 in (1.74 m)
- Positions: Outside right; inside forward; half back

Senior career*
Years	Team	Apps	(Gls)
c. 1905	Leicester Old Boys		
- Leicestershire Regiment
–1910	Leicester Nomads		
1910–1914	Leicester Fosse	106	(23)
1914–1918	Derby County	38	(5)
- * Club domestic league appearances and goals

Thomas Charles Benfield (1889 – 19 September 1918) was an English professional footballer who played in the Football League for Leicester Fosse and Derby County as a forward.

== Career ==
An outside right and inside forward, Benfield played for local Leicester clubs before Second Division Leicester Fosse bought him out of the Army for £25 in July 1910. Over the course of the following four seasons he made 111 appearances, scored 23 goals and was notable for scoring the first goal scored at Arsenal Stadium on 6 September 1913.

Benfield moved to local newly relegated Second Division rivals Derby County in June 1914 and had an excellent 1914–15 season, scoring 15 goals (including a brace in a 6–0 away win over Leicester Fosse on 28 December 1914) and helping the Rams to immediate promotion back to the First Division. The suspension of competitive football at the end of the 1914–15 season brought Benfield's professional career to an end, but he remained with the club and played his final wartime match on 16 March 1918. He also guested for Nottingham Forest and Grimsby Town during the war.

== Personal life ==
Prior to becoming a professional footballer, Benfield served in the Sherwood Foresters between 1905 and 1910. As of 1914, he was living in Leicester with his wife Elsie. After the outbreak of the First World War in 1914, Benfield enlisted in the Leicestershire Regiment and was serving as a sergeant when he was shot by a sniper in the area of Équancourt and Heudicourt, Somme on 11 September 1918, during the Hundred Days Offensive. He died of his wounds following an operation on 19 September, just under two months before the Armistice. Benfield was buried in Varennes Military Cemetery. As of November 2012, Ben Swift, Benfield's great-grand-nephew, was an employee of Leicester City.

== Career statistics ==
Appearances and goals by club, season and competition
Club	Season	League			FA Cup		Total	
Club	Season	Division	Apps	Goals	Apps	Goals	Apps	Goals
Leicester Fosse	1910–11	Second Division	16	3	1	0	17	3
Leicester Fosse	1911–12	Second Division	34	6	3	0	37	6
Leicester Fosse	1912–13	Second Division	20	3	1	0	21	3
Leicester Fosse	1913–14	Second Division	36	11	0	0	36	11
Leicester Fosse	Total		106	23	5	0	111	23
Derby County	1914–15	Second Division	38	15	1	0	39	15
Career total			144	38	6	0	150	38

== Honours ==
Derby County

- Football League Second Division: 1914–15
