= Claude Ferrier =

Scottish architect

Claude Waterlow Ferrier FRIBA (1879 – 6 July 1935) was a Scottish architect, who specialised in the Art Deco style.

== Life ==
Ferrier was the only son of the physician and neurologist Sir David Ferrier, and a nephew (through his mother) of the painter Ernest Albert Waterlow.

Educated at Marlborough College, Ferrier started his career as an apprentice at the practice of Aston Webb, but left to start his own practice at the age of just 23. Ferrier spent much of his time in Continental Europe, especially in France, which influenced his work; an avowed Francophile, he published an English-French dictionary of technical terms. He later returned to London, and set up a practice based in Westminster with William Binnie, a former deputy director of Works at the Imperial War Graves Commission, in 1927.

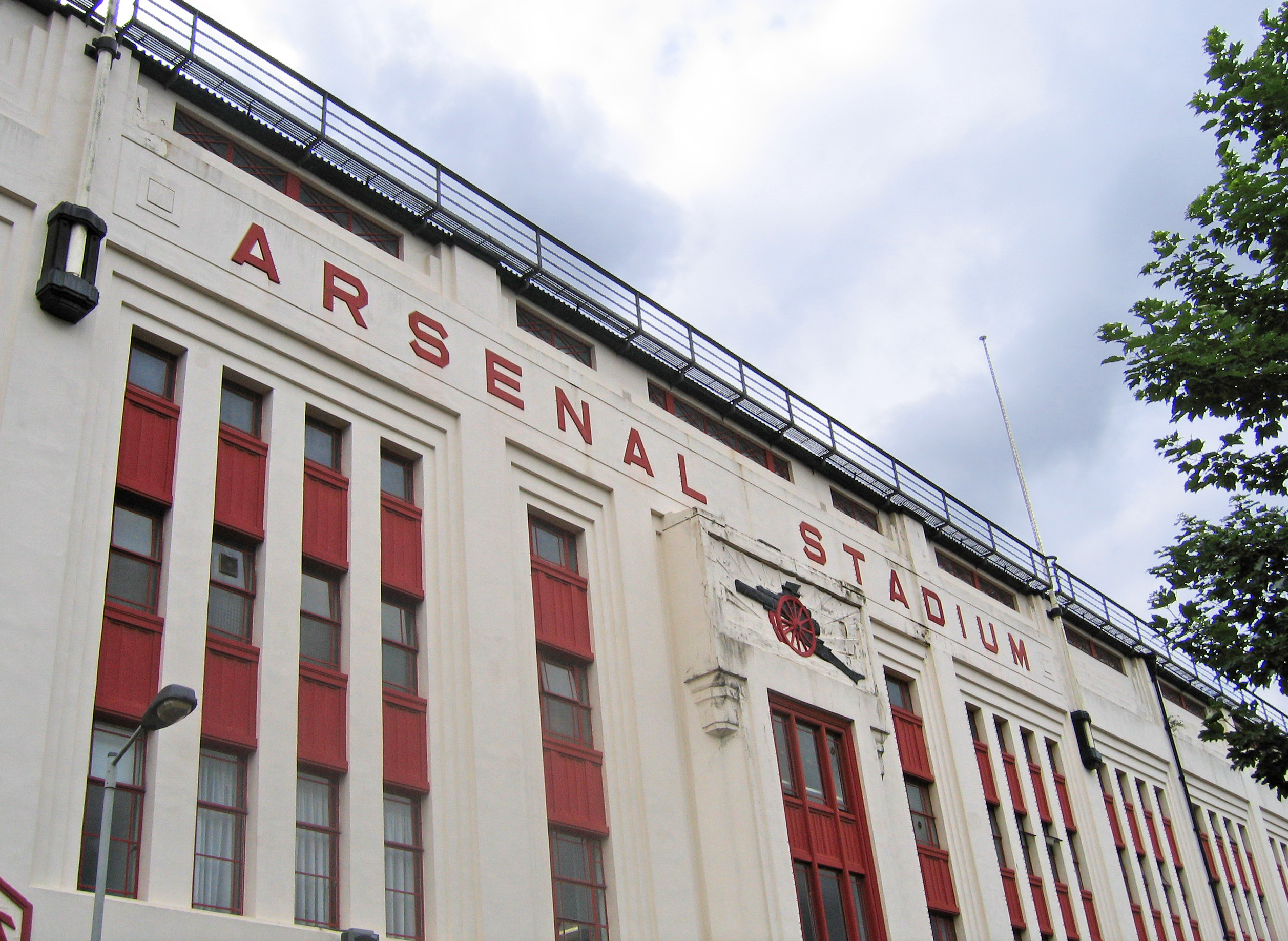
The East Stand, Arsenal Stadium

Buildings he worked on included:

- The headquarters of the RNIB at 224 Great Portland Street, London (built 1909–14)
- Refurbishment of and extension to the Army and Navy Club, St James's Square, London (1925–26)
- Extension to the National Temperance Hospital (now part of University College Hospital), London
- The West and East Stands of Arsenal Stadium, Highbury, London (1932 & 1936 respectively)

Ferrier did not live to see the completion of Highbury; he was killed after being struck by a motorcyclist in a crash the previous summer. A bust of him used to stand inside the West stand of Arsenal Stadium. The bust is now in storage and it will be placed somewhere in Arsenal F.C.'s new stadium Emirates Stadium.
