= Steve Braddock =

English groundskeeper

- Born: 6 February 1964; Hatfield, Hertfordshire, England
- Died: 19 August 2022 (aged 58)
- Known for: Turf management

Steve Braddock (6 February 1964 – 19 August 2022) was an English groundskeeper who was head groundsman for Arsenal between 1987 and 2022. In 2020, he became the second person to enter the Grounds Management Association hall of fame.

== Personal life ==
Braddock was married to Shuk, with whom he had two daughters.

== Death ==
Braddock died in 2022, aged 58. He had become ill during 2020. Arsenal's team wore black armbands in his memory for their next match, against Bournemouth on 20 August.
