= Institute of Groundsmanship =

- Founder: W. H. Bowles
- Established: 1934
- Members: 2000+
- Formerly called: National Association of Groundsmen
- Website: www.iog.org

The Institute of Groundsmanship is the world's largest not-for-profit organisation representing grounds men. Founded in 1934 by W. H. Bowles as the then National Association of Groundsmen, it has sought to improve both the status and standards of grounds professionals.

The Institute offers both short term practical courses with IOG certification and long-term educational qualifications certified by City and Guilds for groundsmen, as well as literature, jobs, a technical reference library, advice and consultancy, a local support network, and updates and newsletters.

== Membership ==
Membership of the IOG is divided into three sectors: Individual, Associate, and Corporate. The IOG currently has over 2,000 paying individual members; membership entitles them to a monthly magazine subscription, a technical reference library, free legal advice, support through local branches, access to the IOG Continuous Professional Development programme, discounts off high street stores, and IOG training courses.
