= 1929–30 Arsenal F.C. season =

English football club season

Arsenal
1929–30 season
- Chairman: Samuel Hill-Wood
- Manager: Herbert Chapman
- Stadium: Highbury
- First Division: 14th
- FA Cup: Winners

The 1929–30 Arsenal F.C. season was 11th consecutive season in the top division of English football. The Gunners won their first ever piece of silverware this season, beating manager Herbert Chapman's old side Huddersfield Town 2–0 in the FA Cup final, the first of many FA Cups the Gunners would go on to win.

== Football League First Division ==
=== League match details ===
Key

- In the result column, Arsenal's score is shown first
- H = Home match
- A = Away match

- pen. = Penalty kick
- o.g. = Own goal

Results

Date	Opponents	Result	Goalscorers	Attendance
31 August 1929	Leeds United (H)	4–0	Parker (pen.), Hulme, Jack (2)	41,885
4 September 1929	Manchester City (A)	1–3	Jack	38,458
7 September 1929	Sheffield Wednesday (A)	2–0	Hulme, Jack	31,735
11 September 1929	Manchester City (H)	3–2	Jack (2), Johnstone	23,057
14 September 1929	Burnley (H)	6–1	Hulme, Jack, Lambert (2), James, Waterfield (o.g.)	38,556
21 September 1929	Sunderland (A)	1–0	Lambert	34,804
25 September 1929	Aston Villa (A)	2–5	Thompson, James	33,850
28 September 1929	Bolton Wanderers (H)	1–2	Jones	42,723
5 October 1929	Everton (A)	1–1	Hulme	45,015
12 October 1929	Derby County (H)	1–1	Parker (pen.)	42,448
19 October 1929	Grimsby Town (H)	4–1	Hulme, Lambert (3)	43,794
26 October 1929	Manchester United (A)	0–1		12,662
2 November 1929	West Ham United (H)	0–1		44,828
9 November 1929	Birmingham (A)	3–2	Hulme (2), Jack	33,904
23 November 1929	Blackburn Rovers (A)	1–1	Halliday	25,591
27 November 1929	Middlesbrough (H)	1–2	Jack	28,326
30 November 1929	Newcastle United (H)	0–1		40,365
14 December 1929	Huddersfield Town (H)	2–0	Hulme, Jack	34,097
16 December 1929	Sheffield United (A)	1–4	Halliday	16,134
21 December 1929	Liverpool (A)	0–1		32,819
25 December 1929	Portsmouth (A)	1–0	James	27,475
26 December 1929	Portsmouth (H)	1–2	Hulme	49,433
28 December 1929	Leeds United (A)	0–2		29,167
4 January 1930	Sheffield Wednesday (H)	2–3	Parker, Bastin	40,766
18 January 1930	Burnley (A)	2–2	Jack, Bastin	22,566
1 February 1930	Bolton Wanderers (A)	0–0		27,336
8 February 1930	Everton (H)	4–0	Williams, Lambert (3)	27,302
19 February 1930	Derby County (A)	1–4	Halliday	11,136
22 February 1930	Grimsby Town (A)	1–1	Lambert	17,151
8 March 1930	West Ham United (A)	2–3	Jack (2)	31,268
12 March 1930	Manchester United (H)	4–2	Hulme, Bastin, Lambert, Williams	18,082
15 March 1930	Birmingham (H)	1–0	James	32,174
29 March 1930	Blackburn Rovers (H)	4–0	Hulme, Lambert, Williams	40,459
2 April 1930	Liverpool (H)	0–1		18,824
5 April 1930	Newcastle United (A)	1–1	Halliday	36,609
9 April 1930	Middlesbrough (A)	1–1	Hulme	9,287
12 April 1930	Sheffield United (H)	8–1	Hulme, Johnstone (2), Lambert (3), James, Bastin	24,217
18 April 1930	Leicester City (H)	1–1	James	46,663
19 April 1930	Huddersfield Town (A)	2–2	Hulme, Bastin	11,988
21 April 1930	Leicester City (A)	6–6	Halliday (4), Bastin (2)	27,241
28 April 1930	Sunderland (H)	0–1		31,250
3 May 1930	Aston Villa (H)	2–4	Lambert (2)	37,036

=== Partial league table ===
Football League First Division final table, positions 12–16
Pos	Team	Pld	W	D	L	GF	GA	GAv	Pts
12	Liverpool	42	16	9	17	63	79	0.797	41
13	Portsmouth	42	15	10	17	66	62	1.065	40
14	Arsenal	42	14	11	17	78	66	1.182	39
15	Bolton Wanderers	42	15	9	18	74	74	1.000	39
16	Middlesbrough	42	16	6	20	82	84	0.976	38

Rules for classification: 1) Points; 2) Goal average; 3) Goals scored

== FA Cup ==
Round	Date	Opponent	Venue	Result	Attendance	Goalscorers
R3	11 January 1930	Chelsea	H	2–0	55,579	
R4	25 January 1930	Birmingham	H	2–2	43,274	
R4 R	29 January 1930	Birmingham	A	1–0	47,521	
R5	15 February 1930	Middlesbrough	A	2–0	42,073	
R6	1 March 1930	West Ham United	A	3–0	40,797	
SF	22 March 1930	Hull City	N	2–2	47,549	
SF R	26 March 1930	Hull City	N	1–0	46,200	
F	26 April 1930	Huddersfield Town	N	2–0	92,486	

== Players ==
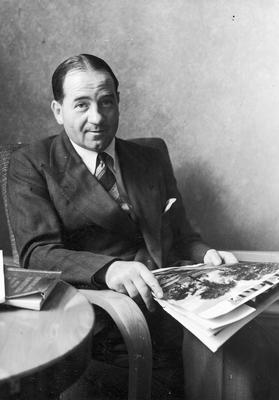
Alex James joined Arsenal from Preston North End in early June 1929 for £8,750.

Player statistics
Player	Position	Football League First Division		FA Cup		Total	
Player	Position	Apps.	Goals	Apps.	Goals	Apps.	Goals
Alf Baker	MF	19	0	7	2	26	2
Cliff Bastin	FW	21	7	8	4	29	11
Jimmy Brain	FW	6	0	0	0	6	0
Jack Butler	MF	2	0	0	0	2	0
Horace Cope	DF	1	0	0	0	1	0
Dave Halliday	FW	15	8	0	0	15	8
Eddie Hapgood	DF	38	0	8	0	46	0
Alf Haynes	MF	13	0	1	0	14	0
Joe Hulme	FW	37	14	4	0	41	14
Bert Humpish	DF	3	0	0	0	3	0
David Jack	MF	33	13	8	3	41	16
Alex James	FW	31	6	6	1	37	7
Bob John	MF	34	0	5	0	39	0
Bill Johnstone	FW	7	3	0	0	7	3
Charlie Jones	FW	31	1	4	0	35	1
Jack Lambert	FW	20	18	8	5	28	23
Dan Lewis	GK	30	0	6	0	36	0
Tom Parker	DF	41	3	8	0	49	3
Harry Peel	FW	1	0	0	0	1	0
Charlie Preedy	GK	12	0	2	0	14	0
Herbie Roberts	MF	26	0	5	0	31	0
Bill Seddon	MF	24	0	3	0	27	0
Leonard Thompson	FW	5	1	1	0	6	1
Joey Williams	FW	12	3	4	0	16	3

== See also ==
- 1929–30 in English football
- List of Arsenal F.C. seasons
