= List of Notts County F.C. managers =

Football club managers in England

Notts County Football Club, commonly known as Notts, (Note: Examples of the club name being shortened to Notts:) is a professional football club based in Nottingham, England. Founded in 1862, Notts County are the oldest professional football club in the world. They first competed in the FA Cup in 1877 and in 1888 became one of the 12 founding members of the Football League. Notts County have been promoted 14 times, relegated 17 times and have played in each of the top 5 divisions of English football.

== Managerial history ==
Club legend Jimmy Sirrel was arguably Notts best manager, winning three promotions in the 1970s and 1980s to reach the First Division in 1981. Notts County's most recent season in the top division was 1991–92 under Neil Warnock, who had overseen back-to-back promotions via the play-offs at Wembley Stadium.

Under future England manager Sam Allardyce, Notts won the Third Division championship in 1997–98, becoming the first team since World War II to win promotion in March, and breaking several club records, including longest winning run (10 games). A 3–1 win at Bury on 9 October 1999 put the Magpies second in the Second Division, but Allardyce resigned shortly afterwards to become manager of Bolton, and Notts would ultimately finish the 1999–2000 season in eighth.

=== List of managers ===
As of 03 June 2026

Name	Nat	From	To	Days in charge	Record				
Name	Nat	From	To	Days in charge	P	W	D	L	Win %
by committee	(England)	1862	1913	—					
Albert Fisher (secretary – manager)	(England)	1913	1927	—	444	167	114	163	37.61
R.C.White (Fisher's absence due to WW1)	(England)	1917	1919	—					
Horace Henshall (secretary – manager)	(England)	1927	1934	—	304	108	81	115	35.53
Charlie Jones	(Wales)	1934	1935	—	61	15	13	33	24.59
David Pratt	(Scotland)	1935	1935	—	7	1	1	5	14.29
Percy Smith	(England)	1935	1936	—	59	22	17	20	37.29
Jimmy McMullan	(Scotland)	1936	1937	—	51	29	11	11	56.86
Harry Parkes	(England)	1938	1938	—	68	24	14	30	35.29
J.R. `Tony`Towers	(England)	1939	1942	—	0	0	0	0	—
Frank Womack	(England)	1942	1943	—	0	0	0	0	—
Frank Buckley	(England)	1944	1946	—	4	2	1	1	50.00
Arthur Stollery	(England)	1946	1949	—	122	54	22	46	44.26
Eric Houghton	(England)	1949	1953	—	186	74	39	73	39.78
George Poyser	(England)	1953	1957	—	147	49	31	67	33.33
Frank Broome (caretaker)	(England)	1957	1957	—					
Tommy Lawton	(England)	7 May 1957	1 July 1958	—	44	13	6	25	29.55
Ernie Coleman (caretaker)	(England)	1958	1958	—					
Frank Hill	(Scotland)	1958	1961	—					
Ernie Coleman	(England)	1961	1963	—					
Eddie Lowe	(England)	1963	1965	—					
Ernie Coleman	(England)	1965	1965	—					
Jack Burkitt	(England)	1966	1967	—	42	15	11	16	35.71
Andy Beattie	(Scotland)	February 1967	September 1967	—	22	5	3	14	22.73
Billy Gray	(England)	1967	1968	—	51	15	13	23	29.41
Jack Wheeler (caretaker)	(England)	1968	1969	—					
Jimmy Sirrel	(Scotland)	1969	1975	—	291	139	72	80	47.77
Ronnie Fenton	(England)	1975	1977	—	90	35	24	31	38.89
Jimmy Sirrel	(Scotland)	1977	1982	—	180	61	57	62	33.89
Howard Wilkinson	(England)	1982	1983	—	49	19	8	22	38.78
Larry Lloyd	(England)	1983	1984	—	66	19	15	32	28.79
Richie Barker	(England)	1984	1985	—	27	5	6	16	18.52
Jimmy Sirrel	(Scotland)	1985	1987	—	110	46	32	32	41.82
John Barnwell	(England)	1987	1988	—	74	28	23	23	37.84
Neil Warnock	(England)	5 January 1989	14 January 1993	1,470	205	90	45	70	43.90
Mick Walker	(England)	14 January 1993	14 September 1994	608	82	31	19	32	37.80
Russell Slade	(England)	September 1994	January 1995	—	23	6	5	12	26.09
Howard Kendall	(England)	12 January 1995	1 April 1995	79	15	4	4	7	26.67
Steve Nicol	(Scotland)	20 January 1995	5 June 1995	136	20	4	7	9	20.00
Colin Murphy	(England)	5 June 1995	23 December 1996	567	83	33	24	26	39.76
Sam Allardyce	(England)	16 January 1997	19 October 1999	1,006	145	56	39	50	38.62
Gary Brazil	(England)	23 October 1999	June 2000	—	34	10	9	15	29.41
Jocky Scott	(Scotland)	28 June 2000	10 October 2001	469	71	28	19	24	39.44
Gary Brazil	(England)	10 October 2001	7 January 2002	89	20	4	6	10	20.00
Bill Dearden	(England)	7 January 2002	6 January 2004	730	103	30	27	46	29.13
Gary Mills	(England)	9 January 2004	4 November 2004	301	40	10	11	19	25.00
Ian Richardson (Caretaker)	(England)	4 November 2004	17 May 2005	194	34	11	9	14	32.35
Gudjon Thordarson	(Iceland)	17 May 2005	12 June 2006	391	50	13	16	21	26.00
Steve Thompson	(England)	12 June 2006	16 October 2007	491	65	21	19	25	32.31
Ian McParland	(Scotland)	18 October 2007	12 October 2009	725	103	28	31	44	27.18
Dave Kevan / Michael Johnson (Caretakers)	(Scotland) (Jamaica)	13 October 2009	27 October 2009	14	2	1	1	0	50.00
Hans Backe	(Sweden)	27 October 2009	15 December 2009	49	7	2	3	2	28.57
Dave Kevan (caretaker)	(Scotland)	15 December 2009	23 February 2010	70	11	6	3	2	54.55
Steve Cotterill	(England)	23 February 2010	27 May 2010	93	18	14	3	1	77.78
Craig Short	(England)	1 July 2010	24 October 2010	115	18	8	1	9	44.44
Paul Ince	(England)	27 October 2010	3 April 2011	158	29	10	6	13	34.48
Carl Heggs (caretaker)	(England)	3 April 2011	11 April 2011	8	2	0	0	2	0.00
Martin Allen	(England)	11 April 2011	18 February 2012	313	43	16	10	17	37.21
Keith Curle	(England)	20 February 2012	2 February 2013	348	51	23	14	14	45.10
Chris Kiwomya	(England)	2 February 2013	27 October 2013	267	34	9	9	16	26.47
Steve Hodge (caretaker)	(England)	27 October 2013	6 November 2013	10	2	1	0	1	50.00
Shaun Derry	(England)	6 November 2013	23 March 2015	502	77	26	14	37	33.77
Paul Hart / Mick Halsall (caretakers)	(England) (England)	23 March 2015	7 April 2015	15	3	0	3	0	0.00
Ricardo Moniz	(Netherlands)	7 April 2015	29 December 2015	266	34	11	8	15	32.35
Mick Halsall / Richard Dryden (caretakers)	(England) (England)	29 December 2015	10 January 2016	12	1	0	0	1	0.00
Jamie Fullarton	(Scotland)	10 January 2016	19 March 2016	69	12	3	1	8	25.00
Mark Cooper	(England)	20 March 2016	7 May 2016	48	10	3	2	5	30.00
John Sheridan	(England)	27 May 2016	2 January 2017	220	32	8	6	18	25.00
Alan Smith (caretaker)	(England)	3 January 2017	12 January 2017	10	1	0	0	1	0.00
Kevin Nolan	(England)	12 January 2017	26 August 2018	591	84	35	23	26	41.67
Steve Chettle / Mark Crossley (caretakers)	(England) (Wales)	26 August 2018	1 September 2018	6	1	0	0	1	0.00
Harry Kewell	(Australia)	31 August 2018	13 November 2018	74	14	3	4	7	21.43
Steve Chettle (caretaker)	(England)	13 November 2018	27 November 2018	15	4	1	2	1	25.00
Neal Ardley	(England)	28 November 2018	24 March 2021	855	108	46	29	33	42.59
Ian Burchnall	(England)	25 March 2021	27 May 2022	428	70	36	14	20	51.43
Luke Williams	(England)	14 June 2022	5 January 2024	570	82	48	16	18	58.54
Jim O'Brien	(Scotland)	5 January 2024	18 January 2024	13	1	0	1	0	0.00
Stuart Maynard	(England)	18 January 2024	22 May 2025	489	73	28	16	29	38.36
Martin Paterson	(Northern Ireland)	22 June 2025	Present		54	27	10	17	50.00

== Sources ==
- Allardyce, Sam (2015). Big Sam: My Autobiography. London: Headline Publishing. ISBN 978-1-47223-267-0.
- Rollin, Glenda (1998). Rothmans Football Yearbook 1998–99. London: Headline Book Publishing. ISBN 0-7472-2125-1.
- Warsop, Keith; Brown, Tony (2007). The Definitive Notts County F.C.: The Oldest League Club in the World. Nottingham: Tony Brown. ISBN 978-1-899468-99-7.
