= 1929–30 Newport County A.F.C. season =

Welsh association football club season

Newport County
1929–30 season
- Manager: Jimmy Hindmarsh
- Stadium: Somerton Park
- Third Division South: 18th
- FA Cup: 2nd round
- Welsh Cup: 6th round
- Top goalscorer: League: Martin (34); All: Martin (37)
- Highest home attendance: 10,766 vs Plymouth Argyle (21 April 1930)
- Lowest home attendance: 1,991 vs Gillingham (7 December 1929)
- Average home league attendance: 3,917
Home colours	Away colours

The 1929–30 season was Newport County's 10th season in the Football League. The club finished in 18th place and along the way recorded their biggest-ever Football League victory—a 10–0 defeat of near-neighbours Merthyr Town.

== Season review ==
=== Results summary ===
Overall								Home						Away					
Pld	W	D	L	GF	GA	GAv	Pts	W	D	L	GF	GA	Pts	W	D	L	GF	GA	Pts
42	12	10	20	74	85	0.871	34	9	9	3	48	29	27	3	1	17	26	56	7

Source: rsssf.com

=== Results by round ===
Round	1	2	3	4	5	6	7	8	9	10	11	12	13	14	15	16	17	18	19	20	21	22	23	24	25	26	27	28	29	30	31	32	33	34	35	36	37	38	39	40	41	42
Ground	A	H	H	A	A	H	A	A	H	A	A	H	A	H	A	H	H	H	H	A	A	A	H	H	H	A	H	A	H	H	A	H	A	A	H	H	A	A	H	H	A	A
Result	L	W	W	L	L	D	L	L	D	L	L	D	L	L	L	D	W	W	W	L	L	W	W	D	L	W	D	D	D	W	L	D	L	L	D	W	L	L	W	L	W	L
Position	16	10	7	7	14	16	16	20	18	20	20	20	20	20	21	21	20	20	18	20	20	19	17	17	17	17	17	18	16	15	16	16	17	17	17	16	17	18	17	17	17	18

Updated to match(es) played on 3 May 1930. Source: statto.com
A = Away; H = Home; W = Win; D = Draw; L = Loss

== Fixtures and results ==
=== Third Division South ===
Date	Opponents	Venue	Result	Scorers	Attendance
31 Aug 1929	Southend United	A	1–2	Morris	8,186
5 Sep 1929	Swindon Town	H	2–1	G.Richardson, Thomas	4,860
7 Sep 1929	Watford	H	1–0	G.Richardson	4,887
9 Sep 1929	Swindon Town	A	1–5	Gittins	4,952
14 Sep 1929	Coventry City	A	0–2		15,456
21 Sep 1929	Clapton Orient	H	0–0		4,877
25 Sep 1929	Crystal Palace	A	0–1		9,445
28 Sep 1929	Brentford	A	0–1		11,073
5 Oct 1929	Bristol Rovers	H	2–2	Gittins, Richards	2,471
12 Oct 1929	Brighton & Hove Albion	A	2–3	Riley, Morris	7,877
19 Oct 1929	Luton Town	A	2–4	G.Richardson, Thomas	8,825
26 Oct 1929	Bournemouth & Boscombe Athletic	H	1–1	Witton	3,640
2 Nov 1929	Walsall	A	1–2	Morris	5,424
9 Nov 1929	Queens Park Rangers	H	4–5	Martin 3, Morris	3,527
16 Nov 1929	Fulham	A	1–2	Martin	28,211
23 Nov 1929	Norwich City	H	4–4	Martin 2, Gittins, Thomas	2,541
7 Dec 1929	Gillingham	H	5–1	Martin 3, G.Richardson, Seymour	1,991
21 Dec 1929	Exeter City	H	4–1	Martin 2, Seymour, OG	2,606
25 Dec 1929	Torquay United	H	2–1	Morris, Thomas	3,337
26 Dec 1929	Torquay United	A	2–3	Martin, Seymour	5,928
31 Dec 1929	Northampton Town	A	0–2		5,797
4 Jan 1930	Watford	A	3–2	Martin 2, McKenna	5,851
18 Jan 1930	Coventry City	H	4–2	Martin 3, McKenna	3,963
25 Jan 1930	Southend United	H	0–0		4,945
1 Feb 1930	Brentford	H	1–3	Gittins	3,827
8 Feb 1930	Bristol Rovers	A	3–2	Martin 2, McKenna	5,469
22 Feb 1930	Luton Town	H	0–0		3,879
1 Mar 1930	Bournemouth & Boscombe Athletic	A	1–1	Riley	5,509
3 Mar 1930	Brighton & Hove Albion	H	2–2	Martin 2	2,670
8 Mar 1930	Walsall	H	3–2	Gittins, Seymour, Martin	4,260
15 Mar 1930	Queens Park Rangers	A	1–4	Martin	7,926
22 Mar 1930	Fulham	H	1–1	Martin	4,626
29 Mar 1930	Norwich City	A	1–4	Thomas	8,473
31 Mar 1930	Clapton Orient	A	1–3	Riley	2,362
5 Apr 1930	Crystal Palace	H	0–0		3,324
10 Apr 1930	Merthyr Town	H	10–0	Martin 5, Gittins 2, Thomas, Bagley, Lawson	1,997
12 Apr 1930	Gillingham	A	0–5		2,743
18 Apr 1930	Plymouth Argyle	A	1–3	Thomas	26,409
19 Apr 1930	Northampton Town	H	2–1	Martin 2	3,282
21 Apr 1930	Plymouth Argyle	H	0–2		10,766
26 Apr 1930	Exeter City	A	4–0	Martin 3, Seymour	3,723
3 May 1930	Merthyr Town	A	1–5	McKenna	1,189

=== FA Cup ===
Round	Date	Opponents	Venue	Result	Scorers	Attendance
1	30 Nov 1929	Kettering Town	H	3–2	Morris, Thomas, Martin	3,721
2	14 Dec 1929	Walsall	H	2–3	Morris, Martin	4,121

=== Welsh Cup ===
Round	Date	Opponents	Venue	Result	Scorers	Attendance
5	20 Mar 1930	Lovells Athletic	H	3–2	Gittins, Seymour, Martin	
6	12 Apr 1930	Colwyn Bay	A	0–4		

== League table ==
Pos	Team	Pld	W	D	L	F	A	GA	Pts
1	Plymouth Argyle	42	30	8	4	98	38	2.58	68
2	Brentford	42	28	5	9	94	44	2.14	61
3	Queens Park Rangers	42	21	9	12	80	68	1.18	51
4	Northampton Town	42	21	8	13	82	58	1.41	50
5	Brighton & Hove Albion	42	21	8	13	87	63	1.38	50
6	Coventry City	42	19	9	14	88	73	1.21	47
7	Fulham	42	18	11	13	87	83	1.05	47
8	Norwich City	42	18	10	14	88	77	1.14	46
9	Crystal Palace	42	17	12	13	81	74	1.09	46
10	Bournemouth & Boscombe Athletic	42	15	13	14	72	61	1.18	43
11	Southend United	42	15	13	14	69	59	1.17	43
12	Clapton Orient	42	14	13	15	55	62	0.89	41
13	Luton Town	42	14	12	16	64	78	0.82	40
14	Swindon Town	42	13	12	17	73	83	0.88	38
15	Watford	42	15	8	19	60	73	0.82	38
16	Exeter City	42	12	11	19	67	73	0.92	35
17	Walsall	42	13	8	21	71	78	0.91	34
18	Newport County	42	12	10	20	74	85	0.87	34
19	Torquay United	42	10	11	21	64	94	0.68	31
20	Bristol Rovers	42	11	8	23	67	93	0.72	30
21	Gillingham	42	11	8	23	51	80	0.64	30
22	Merthyr Town	42	6	9	27	60	135	0.44	21

Pld = Matches played; W = Matches won; D = Matches drawn; L = Matches lost; F = Goals for; A = Goals against;
GA = Goal average; Pts = Points

Key	
	Division Champions
	Re-elected
	Failed re-election
