= Thomas Penn (disambiguation) =

Thomas Penn was the son of William Penn.

Thomas or Tom Penn may also refer to:

- Thomas Penn (historian)
- Tom Penn, sports executive
- Tom Penn (footballer)
