= Tommy Black (footballer, born 1906) =

Scottish footballer

Personal information
- Full name: Thomas Black
- Date of birth: 1 December 1906
- Place of birth: Holytown, Scotland
- Date of death: 1993 (aged 86)
- Place of death: Bellshill, Scotland
- Height: 5 ft 8 1/2 in (1.74 m)
- Position: Left half

Youth career
- –: Strathclyde

Senior career*
Years	Team	Apps	(Gls)
1931–1933	Arsenal	0	(0)
1933–1939	Plymouth Argyle	162	(0)
1939–1940	Southend United	3	(0)
- * Club domestic league appearances and goals

Thomas Black (1 December 1906 – 1993) was a Scottish footballer who played as a left half in the Football League for Plymouth Argyle and Southend United. He also appeared for Arsenal in the FA Cup.

== Life and career ==
Black was born in Holytown. He began his career as an amateur with Strathclyde before joining Football League club Arsenal in 1931. Having spent two seasons playing for the club's reserves, Black was called up to the first team by Herbert Chapman for an FA Cup third round match at Walsall in January 1933. The home side won 2–0, with the second goal coming from a penalty that was given for a foul by Black. He was transfer-listed by Chapman and sold to Second Division club Plymouth Argyle within a week of the defeat. Black made nine appearances in his first two seasons with the club before establishing himself as their first-choice left half during the 1934–35 campaign.

Argyle finished fifth in the league in the 1936–37 season, and Black played in 41 games, which was a career best. After seven seasons with the club and 168 appearances in all competitions, Black moved to Third Division South team Southend United. He played in the first three league games of the 1939–40 campaign before it was abandoned due to the Second World War. He then left Southend United for Third Lanark FC in December 1939. He played three matches for Third Lanark in the Emergency League West, then played for them in the Southern League until 1942.
