= Ernie Coleman (footballer) =

English footballer (1908–1984)

Personal information
- Full name: Ernest Coleman
- Date of birth: 4 January 1908
- Place of birth: Blidworth, Nottinghamshire, England
- Date of death: 20 January 1984 (aged 76)
- Position: Centre forward

Youth career
- Hucknall

Senior career*
Years	Team	Apps	(Gls)
1927–1929	Halifax Town	19	(5)
1929–1932	Grimsby Town	85	(57)
1932–1934	Arsenal	45	(26)
1934–1937	Middlesbrough	85	(21)
1937–1939	Norwich City	63	(25)
Total		297	(134)

Managerial career
- Linby Colliery
- 1961–1963: Notts County
- 1965–1966: Notts County
- * Club domestic league appearances and goals

Ernest "Ernie" Coleman (4 January 1908 – 20 January 1984) was an English footballer who played as a centre forward.

== Career ==
Born in Blidworth, Nottinghamshire, Coleman started his career as a youth playing for Hucknall. After being turned down by Nottingham Forest he joined Halifax Town of the Third Division North in 1927. He scored five times in nineteen appearances, enough to catch the attention of Grimsby Town of the Second Division, joining them in March 1928. In just eight appearances in the 1928-29 season he scored seven times, helping Grimsby reach the First Division. Coleman remained at Grimsby for the next three seasons, and was Grimsby's top scorer in 1930-31 and 1931-32, and in March 1932 was signed by Herbert Chapman for £7,500 to join the reigning league champions, Arsenal; he made 85 league appearances for Grimsby, scoring 57 goals.

Intended as a replacement for Jack Lambert, Coleman made his Arsenal debut in a 2–1 win against Leicester City at Highbury on 5 March 1932 and played a total of six games that season, as Arsenal finished runners-up to Everton. In his first full season at the club, 1932-33, Coleman scored 24 times in just 27 league games, including two hat-tricks as Arsenal reclaimed their title, earning Coleman a championship medal. However, his form dropped in 1933-34 and he only scored once in 12 league appearances, though he played as they won the 1933 FA Charity Shield. The signing of Ted Drake in March 1934 meant Coleman was forced out of the Arsenal team, and he signed for Middlesbrough in August 1934. In total he had played 47 games for Arsenal, scoring 26 goals.

Coleman spent three seasons with Middlesbrough, scoring 21 goals in 85 league appearances, before finishing his career with Norwich City. After the Second World War, he was manager of Linby Colliery he left Linby to manage Notts County and saved them from relegation from the Football League. He died in 1984, aged 76.
