= Rochdale Town A.F.C. =

Defunct football club

Rochdale Town
- Full name: Rochdale Town Association Football Club
- Nicknames: the Rochdalians, the Townsmen
- Founded: 1901
- Dissolved: 1904
- Ground: Rochdale Cricket Ground
- Chairman: Mr D. Nevin
- Secretary: W. Greenhalgh

Rochdale Town A.F.C. was an association football club from the town of Rochdale, Lancashire, which played in the early 1900s.

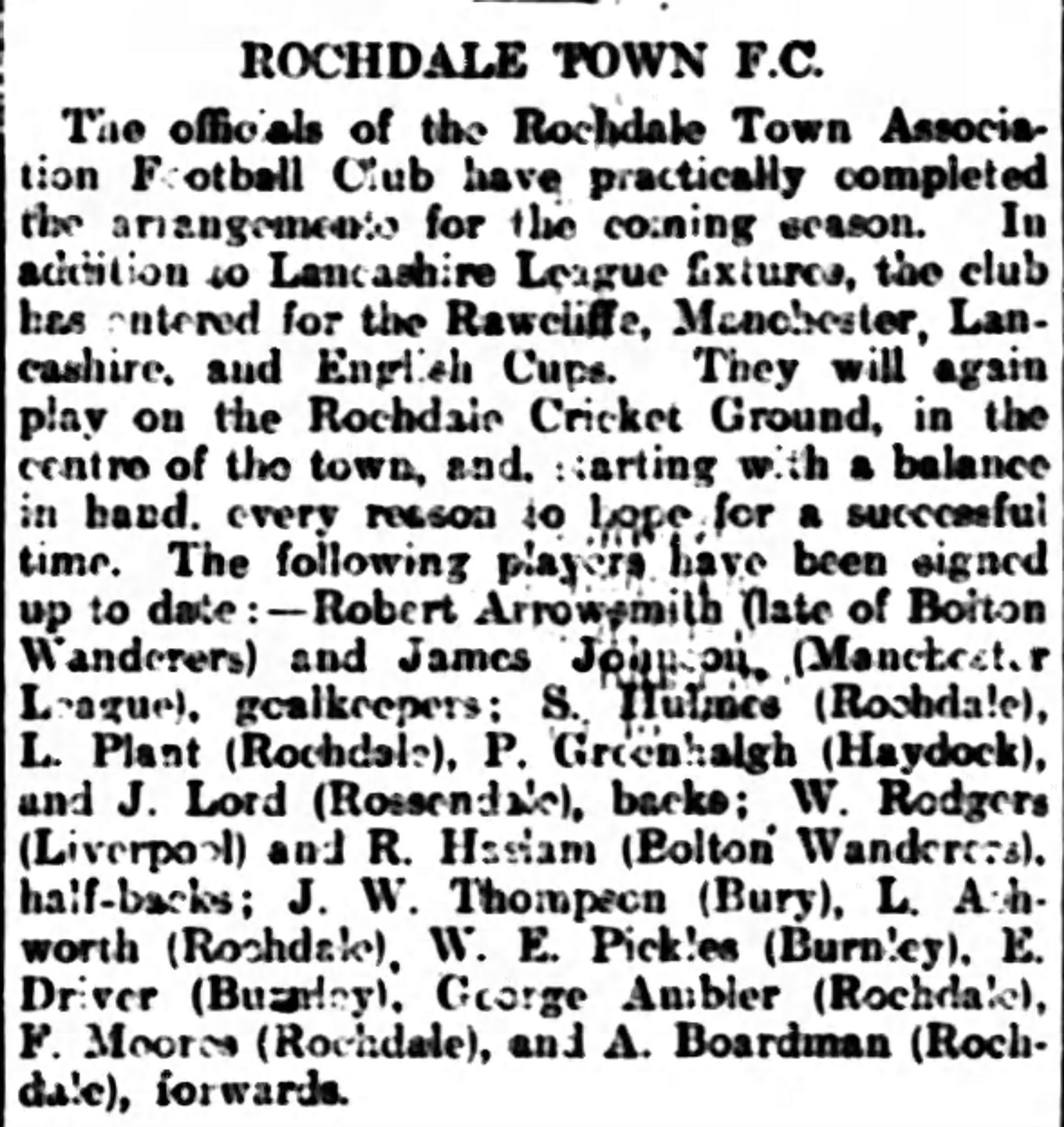
Rochdale Town A.F.C. preparations for the new season, Formby Times, 9 August 1902

== History ==
The club was formed on 1 January 1901, in the immediate aftermath of the collapse of Rochdale A.F.C., although the club was unable to play until it secured a ground, which it did in June. Nevertheless, the club did try to take over Rochdale A.F.C.'s fixtures in the Lancashire League for the remainder of the 1900–01 season, and did in fact join before the 1901–02 campaign.

The club finished 7th in the League, out of 13 clubs, in its first season, and also made a slight profit of £5 on income of £507; it was 7th again in 1902–03, this time out of 12. In 1903, the League was merged into the Lancashire Combination, and the Townsmen were entered into the second division. The club reached the third qualifying round of the FA Cup in both 1901–02 and 1902–03, and also entered the Lancashire Senior Cup in both seasons, but did not win a tie in either season. It finished the 1902–03 season losing to Southport Central in the Rawtenstall Charity Cup semi-final.

The club did not enter senior competition for 1903–04, playing instead in the Lancashire Junior Cup. Its ground change meant it could not host fixtures for the first month of the season, but, more seriously, the club had the prospect of entering the season without any players; not one of its squad had renewed contracts by mid-August 1903, resulting in the disbanding of the second XI and adverts being placed outside the district to recruit new men. The club had made a loss of £55 for the previous season, even after the club committee wrote off loans which they had given to the club.

With Rochdale Hornets having gathered most of the support for a winter game in the town, Rochdale Town found it impossible to compete; when home matches clashed, the Hornets' crowds were over 6,000, while the Townsmen could only attract 500, and losses caused had run to over £1,000. In December 1903, after two home matches for which the gate receipts were £6, the club withdrew from the Lancashire Combination. It did not formally disband at that time, with the club's league place being taken by Atherton Church House. At the time Town quit, its record was a mere 2 wins and 2 draws from 15 matches, only ahead of Bacup, who had played 5 games fewer. The club's final league match was a 3–1 home defeat to Brynn Central on 28 November, a sign of the club's straits being that it could only field 10 men.

The club was still in the Junior Cup (ironically, having beaten Atherton Church House in the first round), and managed to field an XI for its second round tie with Earlestown in January 1904, but it was hammered 13–0, five goals coming in the first 20 minutes. That defeat killed off the last remnants of the club.

== Ground ==
The club originally played at the Rochdale Cricket Ground, in the centre of town. In August 1903 it moved to "the old St Clement's ground, Spotland", the rent of £30 being half that which it paid to the cricket club, and the advantage of being available for longer in the season. Even that proved problematic for the club, having to play away matches for the first month of the season while the ground was being prepared, and the club having to come to a new arrangement when £15 fell due in November.
