= Spotland Stadium =

Football stadium

- Crown Oil Arena
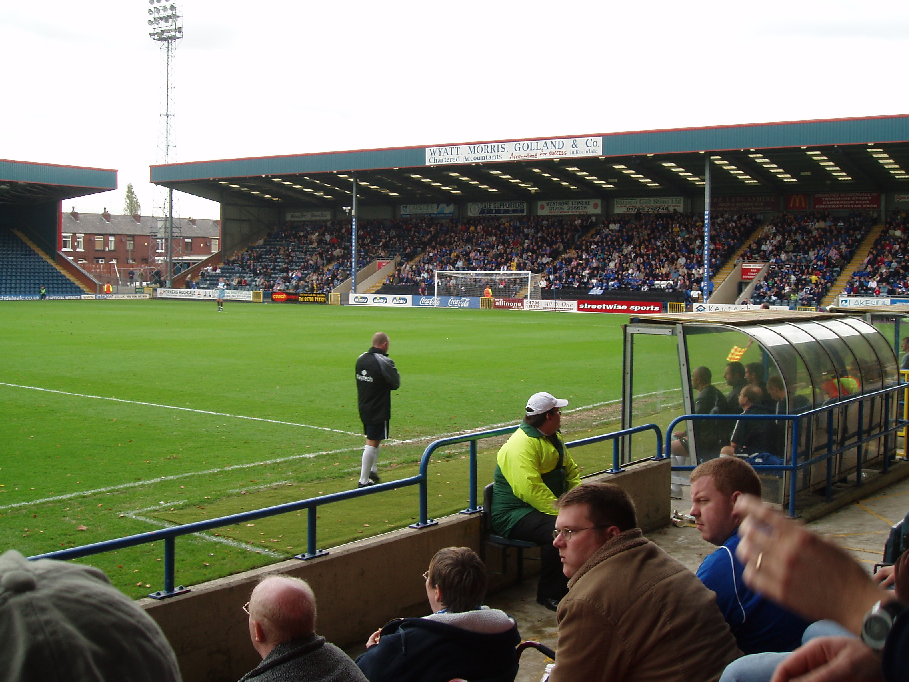
- Spotland Stadium in 2005
- Interactive map of Spotland Stadium
- Former names: St Clement's Playing Fields
- Location: Sandy Lane; Rochdale; Greater Manchester; OL11 5DR
- Coordinates: 53°37′15″N 2°10′48″W
- Owner: Rochdale A.F.C.
- Capacity: 10,249
- Surface: Grass
- Scoreboard: Clough Scoreboard
- Field size: 115 yd × 74 yd (105 m × 68 m)

Construction
- Opened: 1878

Tenants
- St Clement's Rugby Club (1878–1897); Rochdale A.F.C. (1896) (1900–1901); Rochdale Town F.C. (1902–1903); Rochdale A.F.C. (1907–present); Rochdale Hornets (1988–present)

Spotland Stadium, known as the Crown Oil Arena for sponsorship reasons, is a multi-purpose sports stadium in the Spotland district of Rochdale, Greater Manchester, England, which is home to Rochdale Association Football Club and the Rochdale Hornets Rugby League Football Club. The venue has a capacity of 10,249.

== History ==
Spotland was originally known as St Clement's Playing Fields, after the nearby St Clement's Church. Having previously been used for cricket, it became the home of St Clement's Rugby Club in 1878, until they disbanded in 1897. As well as staging local rugby competitions, the ground briefly hosted two short-lived football clubs – the earlier Rochdale A.F.C. from 1900 to 1901 and Rochdale Town from 1902 to 1903, but both folded. The present Rochdale A.F.C. was then formed to use the ground in 1907, later buying the freehold for £1,700 in 1914. By the time the club joined the Football League in 1921, a low wooden grandstand had been built on the south side of the ground, once the location of the cricket pavilion. Also by this time, the name of the surrounding area of the town, Spotland, had been adopted as the ground's name.

In August 2016, Rochdale A.F.C. renamed Spotland Stadium the Crown Oil Arena as part of a sponsorship deal by the Bury-based fuel company Crown Oil. In 2018, due to the winter weather the pitch got into such a bad state that a number of games had to be postponed. Subsequently, Rochdale were drawn against Tottenham Hotspur in the FA Cup and the Spurs manager Mauricio Pochettino was quoted "not a pitch in a condition to play football" after seeing some pictures leading Rochdale to relay the surface in time for their game.

== Structure and facilities ==
The ground has four stands: the David Kilpatrick Stand (or Main Stand), the Sandy Lane End, the Smith Metals Family Stand (Pearl Street End) and the Reside Estate Agency Stand (the Willbutts Lane Stand). All are fully seated, apart from the Sandy Lane End, which is a small terrace behind one of the goals.

The Main Stand features a statue of a long-standing Rochdale fan, David Clough, situated where he watched matches as a season-ticket holder. He had helped the club raise funds and left £250,000 to the club in his will when he died in 2020. The statue was unveiled in September 2021.

== Other uses ==
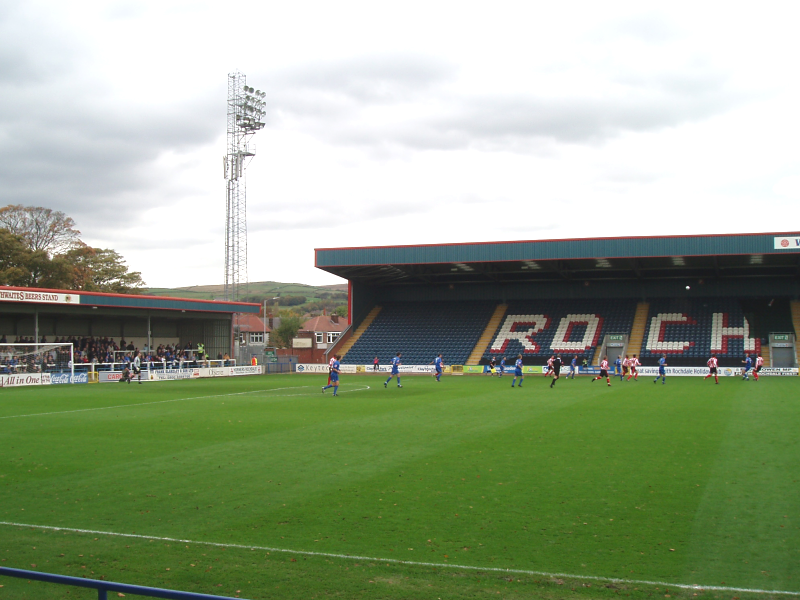
Spotland Stadium

Apart from local football and rugby league, Spotland has in the past been used to host minor nations rugby league matches, such as British Amateur Rugby League Association (British Amateur Rugby League Association) matches, and also the National League Cup finals of 2003 and 2004.

=== Rugby League World Cup ===
Spotland Stadium was selected as a venue for the 2013 Rugby League World Cup hosting a match between Fiji and Ireland. This was the first time that Rochdale has staged an event in a World Cup in any sport and the event was sold out with almost 9,000 people attending. (Note that Spotland Stadium had earlier been used to host the match between Ireland and Moldova in the 1995 Emerging Nations tournament which ran alongside that year's Rugby League World Cup, but this event is not considered to be part of the World Cup proper.)
