= Alex James (footballer) =

Scottish footballer

Personal information
- Full name: Alexander Wilson James
- Date of birth: 14 September 1901
- Place of birth: Mossend, Lanarkshire, Scotland
- Date of death: 1 June 1953 (aged 51)
- Place of death: London, England
- Position: Inside forward

Senior career*
Years	Team	Apps	(Gls)
- Bellshill Athletic
- Ashfield
1922–1925	Raith Rovers	98	(27)
1925–1929	Preston North End	147	(53)
1929–1937	Arsenal	231	(26)
1939	Drumcondra	0	(0)
Total		476	(106)

International career
1925–1932	Scotland	8	(3 (Note: James is credited with having scored an additional goal in the 7–3 Scotland win again Ireland in 1929. There was some controversy over Scotland's sixth goal in that both Hughie Gallacher, who had already scored four times, and Alex James went for the ball at the same point. Correspondence between Queen of the South FC and the Scottish Football Museum in 2016 favoured Gallacher, stating "Hughie himself was insistent that the goal was his, claiming that as he and Alex James (who was a good friend of his) were of a similar build (and of course in 1929 there were no numbers on the jerseys), it was easy for pressmen to make a mistake". James remains credited with the goal in some sources (including the Scottish Football Association website profiles as of 2021).))
- * Club domestic league appearances and goals

Alexander Wilson James (14 September 1901 – 1 June 1953) was a Scottish international footballer. He is mostly noted as a playmaking lynchpin at Arsenal with whom he won six trophies from 1930 to the 1936 season. James featured as a deep-lying creative midfielder who provided a link between defence and attack. He was famed for his high level of footballing intelligence, outstanding ball control and supreme passing.

James was described by Tom Finney as "an inspiration" and "pure magic" with his style of play eventually leading to comparisons with Dennis Bergkamp. His rheumatism meant he wore "baggy" shorts so as to conceal the long johns he put on for warmth. His baggy attire became his own trademark look displayed upon the field of play.

== Early years ==
Born in Mossend, Lanarkshire, James was schooled at the Bellshill Academy in Bellshill where he began a long friendship with Hughie Gallacher. James started his youth footballing career with local Junior clubs, Bellshill Athletic and Ashfield.

== Club career ==
=== Raith Rovers ===
Alex James joined Raith Rovers in 1922. Having finished third in the season before his arrival, Rovers' best league finish whilst James was at the club was fourth in 1924. Raith placed ninth within both the 1923 and 1925 seasons. All in all he made close to a hundred League appearances in his three seasons at Starks Park, and was also involved in an incident of shipwrecking in the summer of 1923 when the team's vessel bound for the Canary Islands struck rocks in a storm.

=== Preston North End ===
James then went on to link up for £3,000 (£158,000 today) with club Preston North End in 1925. During his time at the Second Division side, The Lilywhites twice seemed certain for promotion to only finish sixth and fourth respectively. He then fell out with the club firstly over his wages which were at the Football League's maximum of £8 a week, and also due to Preston not always releasing him for international duty with Scotland. Altogether James scored 55 goals in 157 appearances with the club.

=== Arsenal ===
James left Preston for Herbert Chapman's Arsenal in 1929 for £8,750 (£481,000 today), making his debut against Leeds United on 31 August 1929 two weeks before his 28th birthday. To circumvent the maximum wage rules, Arsenal arranged it so that his employment at the club was supplemented by a £250-a-year "sports demonstrator" job at Selfridges, the London department store. James had an unremarkable first season at Arsenal, partly because he was still recovering from injuries he had accrued at Preston. However his first season brought the first of six trophies in seven seasons when he played in the 1930 FA Cup Final win against Huddersfield Town, scoring the first in a 2–0 win to give Arsenal their first major trophy.

Over time he settled into his role and became part of the dominant side of English football in 1930s. Playing so deep as a supporting player, he scored relatively few goals for Arsenal – only 27 in 261 appearances – but created many times that number. James's passing and vision supplied the ammunition that Joe Hulme, David Jack, Cliff Bastin, and Jack Lambert all put into the net. James orchestrated Arsenal to their first ever First Division Championship win in 1930–31.

The defending champions started the 1931–32 season badly largely through missing goals from injured Jack Lambert. However, as Lambert returned to goalscoring form Arsenal enjoyed a good run to regain ground on leaders Everton. After their FA Cup semi final win they harboured hopes of a league and cup double; they were now only three points behind Everton with a game in hand. However, only two minutes into the next game at West Ham United, James suffered serious ligament damage that caused him to miss the rest of the league season. Without their playmaker, Arsenal won only one more league game and finished second to Everton. They also lost in the 1932 FA Cup Final against Newcastle United. James had been passed fit before injuring himself in a pre-match photo call for the press. Without him, Arsenal lost 2–1, albeit thanks to a highly controversial goal from Newcastle's Jack Allen. He recovered to help Arsenal to a second title in 1932–33.

Another spate of injuries marred James's 1933–34 season. Arsenal retained their title but scored far fewer (75) goals in the process. With James recovered they won a fourth championship, and their third in a row in 1934–35 in style. Ted Drake scored 42 league goals in his first season with the club, many of them supplied by James.

In 1935–36 James won his last trophy, a second FA Cup winners' medal, when he captained Arsenal to their 1–0 win over Sheffield United. With age and injuries taking their toll in the last two years of his career, Alex James retired from playing in the summer of 1937.

== International career ==
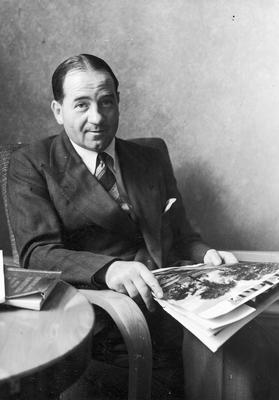
Alex James

Despite his club form, James won just eight caps for Scotland. This was partly due to Preston's reluctance to release him for international matches. He made his international debut on 31 October 1925 in a game against Wales which Scotland won 3–0. With the legendary "Wembley Wizards" team he scored a brace in their 5–1 thrashing of England at Wembley in 1928. This game was one of six where James and Hughie Gallacher both played with Scotland winning all of them. All three of James's international goals also came while playing alongside Gallacher.

== Later years ==
In the summer of 1939, James went to Poland, invited by the Polish Football Association (PZPN). He spent six weeks there, working with Polish coach Józef Kałuża and members of the national team. He taught them modern tactics and led several training sessions. James also played in one or two friendly games with Warsaw's teams.

In September 1939 James signed for Drumcondra in the League of Ireland and featured in two games for them. Both matches ended in defeat for Drumcondra to the same opponents St. James's Gate F.C. in the League of Ireland Shield and Leinster Senior Cup competitions respectively. After failing to agree terms with Drumcondra James left the club later that month.

During World War II he served in the Royal Artillery. After the war he became a journalist and as well running a football pools competition.

In 1949 he was invited back to Arsenal to coach the club's youth sides. However, he died quite suddenly from cancer in 1953 at the age of 51. He was survived by his wife and three children.

James was inducted into both the Scottish Football Hall of Fame and English Football Hall of Fame in 2005 in recognition of his contribution to the English game.

== In popular culture ==
He is mentioned in the lyrics of the 1930s song "With Her Head Tucked Underneath Her Arm" which was written by R. P. Weston and Bert Lee and originally performed by Stanley Holloway.

== Honours ==
Arsenal

- Football League First Division: 1930–31, 1932–33, 1933–34, 1934–35
- FA Cup: 1929–30, 1935–36
- FA Charity Shield: 1931, 1933

Individual

- English Football Hall of Fame: 2005
- Scottish Football Hall of Fame: 2005
- Raith Rovers Hall of Fame: 2013
