= Herbert Chapman =

English association football player and manager (1878–1934)

Personal information
- Date of birth: 19 January 1878
- Place of birth: Kiveton Park, England
- Date of death: 6 January 1934 (aged 55)
- Place of death: Hendon, England
- Position: Inside forward

Senior career*
Years	Team	Apps	(Gls)
–1896	Kiveton Park		
1896–1897	Ashton North End		
1897	Stalybridge Rovers		
1897–1898	Rochdale		
1898–1899	Grimsby Town	10	(4)
1899	Swindon Town	3	(2)
1899–1900	Sheppey United		
1900–1901	Worksop Town		
1901–1902	Northampton Town	22	(14)
1902–1903	Sheffield United	21	(2)
1903–1905	Notts County	7	(1)
1904–1905	→ Northampton Town (loan)		
1905–1907	Tottenham Hotspur	42	(16)
1907–1909	Northampton Town		

Managerial career
- 1907–1912: Northampton Town
- 1912–1918: Leeds City
- 1921–1925: Huddersfield Town
- 1925–1934: Arsenal
- * Club domestic league appearances and goals

Herbert Chapman (19 January 1878 – 6 January 1934) was an English football player and manager. Though he had an undistinguished playing career, he went on to become one of the most influential and successful managers in the early 20th century, before his sudden death in 1934. He is regarded as one of the game's greatest innovators.

As a player, Chapman played for a variety of clubs, at Football League and non-League levels. His record was generally unremarkable as a player; he made fewer than 40 League appearances over the course of a decade and did not win any major honours. Instead, he found success as a manager, first at Northampton Town between 1908 and 1912, which he led to a Southern League title. This attracted the attention of larger clubs and he moved to Leeds City, where he started to improve the team's fortunes before the First World War intervened. After the war ended, City were implicated in an illegal payments scandal and were eventually disbanded. Chapman was initially banned from football but successfully appealed. He took over at Huddersfield Town, winning an FA Cup and two First Division titles in the period of four years.

In 1925, Arsenal successfully tempted Chapman to join them, and he led the club to its first ever silverware by winning one FA Cup and two First Division titles. His work at Arsenal resulted in their becoming the dominant team of the 1930s – they won five League titles and two FA Cups in the decade before the suspension of football due to the outbreak of the Second World War – but he did not live to see the entirety of his team's success, dying suddenly from pneumonia in 1934, at the age of 55.

He is credited with improving Arsenal. He introduced new tactics (the WM formation, which forms the core of most modern-day formations) and training techniques to the game and the use of physiotherapists. He led the team, rather than letting board members lead. He also used floodlighting and numbered shirts, entered European club competitions, and has received many posthumous honours in recognition.

== Early life ==
Chapman was born in Kiveton Park, near Rotherham on 19 January 1878. His father, John, was a coal miner, but rather than spend his own life working down the pit, the young Herbert was bright enough to win a place at Sheffield Technical College (later to become part of the University of Sheffield), where he studied mining engineering.

Chapman was one of eleven children and was born into a keen sporting family, with two of his brothers also playing professional football. The most successful of these was his younger brother Harry, who played for The Wednesday during the 1900s, winning two League Championships and an FA Cup. His elder brother Thomas played for Grimsby Town, while another brother, Matthew, later became a director of the same club.

== Playing career ==
Chapman's playing career was that of a typical journeyman, owing mostly to the fact he often played as an amateur; this meant that whether he could play for a particular club was dictated by whether he could find an appropriate job nearby. He first played as a youth for his local side, Kiveton Park Colliery, winning the Hatchard Cup in 1894 alongside team-mate William Ross. He left the village that summer to join Ashton North End, before moving on to Stalybridge Rovers and then Rochdale (not to be confused with the modern-day Rochdale) – all three clubs being members of the Lancashire League. Chapman played at inside right, and although he lacked the skill of his brother Harry Chapman, he compensated for it with his strength and robustness.

In 1898, he moved to Second Division Grimsby Town. Though now playing in the professional Football League, Chapman was still an amateur at this stage and obtained a job with a firm of local solicitors to earn his way. Grimsby started the season poorly – they were near the bottom of the division by Christmas and were beaten 7–0 by Preston North End in the FA Cup, but rallied to finish tenth at the end of the 1898–99 season. By this time Chapman had been dropped from the team, having been unsuccessfully moved to centre forward, an unfamiliar position for him. He was released by Grimsby and drifted down into non-league football with a brief spell at Swindon Town, playing three games and scoring twice, but had to leave the club as he was unable to find a job in the area. He moved on to see out the season with Sheppey United, who finished bottom of the Southern League in 1899–1900. Chapman finished as United's top scorer but was injured at the end of this season, and still unable to find a job. Disheartened, he returned to his home town and turned out for Worksop Town of the Midland League in 1900–01, while resuming his studies, this time at Old Firth College in Sheffield.

Because of his studies, he mainly played for Worksop's reserves, but in a first-team match against Northampton Town he caught the opposition's eye and they offered him a contract, leading him to turn professional for the first time in 1901. He played for Northampton for the whole 1901–02 season, finishing as top scorer with 14 goals in 22 games for the club. During that season he had impressed in an FA Cup match against Sheffield United, leading them to offer Chapman a contract at the end of the season; Chapman accepted but dropped down to amateur status, wishing to make use of his engineering qualifications in the local area. He played 22 matches and scored twice for United, but struggled to keep his place in a team full of internationals, and was sold to Notts County for £300 at the end of 1902–03. Chapman turned professional again, but only made seven appearances in two years for County, scoring once.

In 1904, Chapman moved back to his old club Northampton Town, playing a season effectively on loan from Notts County (as they kept his registration), before being transferred permanently in 1905 to Tottenham Hotspur for £70. He scored eleven goals for Spurs in their 1905–06 Southern League campaign. He spent 1906–07 in and out of the side, scoring just three goals. With the season drawing to a close, he decided that he had had "a good innings" and decided to leave Tottenham and professional football for good, in favour of pursuing his career in engineering.

== Managerial career ==
=== Northampton Town ===
In 1907, as he was about to leave Tottenham Hotspur, Chapman had recommended Spurs team-mate Walter Bull to his old club Northampton Town, as their new manager. However, Bull changed his mind, and in turn recommended that Chapman take the job instead. Chapman changed his mind about retiring from the game, and instead agreed to become player-manager of Northampton Town. Northampton had finished bottom of the Southern League two seasons running immediately before Chapman's appointment, but Chapman turned the club around within a short period of time.

At the time, teams rarely employed tactics of any sort – Chapman would later remark: "No attempt was made to organise victory. The most that I remember was the occasional chat between, say two men playing on the same wing." As a manager, he sought to change that; after seeing Northampton lose to Norwich City despite dominating, Chapman opined that "a team can attack for too long". He thus set about creating a tactical framework for all his players; he dropped the half backs (midfield) back to give his forwards more space and draw the opposition defenders out of the penalty area, while encouraging his own back line to pass their way out of trouble. Gradually, he created a style of highly organised, counter-attacking football, which was at odds with the prevailing orthodoxy but nevertheless highly effective; Swindon Town's England international Harold Fleming, after losing 4–1 at home to Northampton, remarked to Chapman: "You have something more than a team: you have a machine."

To allow his system to reach its full potential, Chapman encouraged his chairman to spend money on new players. The club's first ever transfer fee, £400, was paid for Welsh international Lloyd Davies who remains Northampton's most capped player, winger Fred McDiarmid and playmaking centre half David McCartney. With this new talent, in his first season in charge, Chapman led Northampton to eighth place; with additional new signings, such as inside forward Albert Lewis from Coventry City, he used this as a springboard to take the Southern League title in 1908–09, with Lewis finishing as top scorer.

By now, Chapman had retired as a player in first-class football, having played his last match against Watford in January 1909, but filled the gap he left, as well as showing his eye for spotting talent, by signing players such as future England international Fanny Walden. As Southern League champions, Northampton contested and lost the 1909 FA Charity Shield, 2–0 to Newcastle United, and although they did not win the Southern League title again during Chapman's time as manager, they finished in the top four in each of the following three seasons. Additionally, they proved their mettle in the FA Cup against First Division sides, knocking out The Wednesday and taking Nottingham Forest and Newcastle United to replays, losing 1–0 both times.

Chapman was keen to get Northampton Town into the Football League, but with no automatic promotion or relegation rules at the time this proved very difficult. Chapman proposed a new two-division Football Alliance underneath the two divisions of the Football League, with automatic promotion and relegation (a similar system to the four-division League setup introduced in 1921), but this was rejected at the time (and would not come about until 1920). In the 1912 close season, he was offered the chance to manage Second Division Leeds City, and with Northampton's blessing moved north again to join the League club.

=== Leeds City ===
Leeds City had finished 19th in the Second Division in the season preceding Chapman's arrival, and were facing re-election. Chapman played an essential part in lobbying for the side's readmission and Leeds City were duly re-elected. That done, Chapman signed new talent such as Jimmy Speirs from Bradford City and despite some erratic performances – losing 6–0 in between two 5–1 wins, for example – City finished sixth in 1912–13, Chapman's first season. Attendances rose at Elland Road from 8,500 to 13,000 in his first year, as Chapman's attacking side scored 70 goals, the second-highest total in the entire division.

With a strengthening of the defence, City's form improved further the next season, in 1913–14, coming fourth, two points outside the promotion places. Despite having failed on his promise to get the team promoted within two years, City's rising attendances and resulting better profits for the club kept the directors happy, and the club were confident of promotion in 1914–15. However, the declaration of the First World War disrupted Leeds City's season, with attendances down as men signed up to fight. Chapman by now had amassed a very large squad and was unable to pick a consistent side, continually changing his first-choice lineup. Leeds City lost six of their last eight games of the season, finishing just fifteenth.

League football was suspended for the rest of the war, with Leeds City playing in regional competitions. With many players away fighting or having left the game due to a drop in wages, Leeds relied heavily on guest players during these matches. Chapman, meanwhile, had decided to help the war effort by taking up a position as manager of a munitions factory at Barnbow, near Cross Gates in 1916. For the next two years, City's assistant manager, George Cripps stood in for Chapman on the administrative side, while chairman Joe Connor and another director took charge of the team.

Chapman returned to Leeds City from Barnbow after hostilities had ended, but resigned suddenly in December 1918, eventually moving to Selby to take up a position as a superintendent at an oil and coke works. No reason was given for his resignation, but as football resumed in 1919–20, Leeds City were accused by a former player of financial irregularities, involving illegal payments to guest players during wartime matches. No documentary evidence was produced, but Leeds' refusal to allow the authorities access to their financial records was deemed a sign of guilt, and they were expelled from the Football League in October 1919 and five club officials, including Chapman, were banned from football for life. The club was dissolved, with the players auctioned off and their Elland Road ground taken over by the newly formed Leeds United.

=== Huddersfield Town ===
Chapman (standing far left), with the Huddersfield Town team of 1921–22, the season they first won the FA Cup

Chapman was still working at the coke works in Selby when his ban was imposed, but by Christmas 1920 the company was sold up and he was laid off. Soon after, however, he was approached by Huddersfield Town to become assistant to Ambrose Langley, who had been a former team-mate of Herbert Chapman's brother Harry at The Wednesday. Huddersfield Town backed Chapman in an appeal against his ban, arguing that as he had been working at the factory in Barnbow during the war, he had not been in charge of Leeds City during the time illegal payments were supposed to have been paid. The ban was overturned, and Chapman was formally installed as Langley's assistant on 1 February 1921.

Chapman was promoted to full secretary-manager, replacing Langley, the following month, and soon made an impact, signing players such as England international Clem Stephenson from Aston Villa (who became captain under Chapman) and 18-year-old unknown George Brown (who went on to become Huddersfield's all-time top scorer). In Chapman's first full season in charge (1921–22), Huddersfield Town won the FA Cup, beating Preston North End 1–0 in the final at Stamford Bridge, the club's first major trophy. In the league, however, his side had spent most of the season fighting relegation and had finished 14th, so Chapman looked to strengthen his squad.

As at Northampton, Chapman's tactics were based upon the principles of a strong defence and a fast, counter-attacking response, with the focus on quick, short passing and mazy runs from his wingers, who would pass low inside the defence instead of crossing from the byline. He had been granted control of all footballing affairs at the club and made this responsibility work to his advantage, encouraging the club's reserve and third teams to play the same style of football so that their players would function effectively in the first team if selected. He employed a wide-ranging scouting network to find the right players for his tactical system. Bolstered by the money from the cup run, Chapman was able to make further signings such as goalkeeper Ted Taylor and forward Charlie Wilson (later to be joined by George Cook).

With new players and using Chapman's system, Huddersfield were transformed. They finished third in 1922–23 and went on to win their first League title in 1923–24. This success was by the narrowest of margins – equal on points with Cardiff City, Huddersfield won by a difference of 0.024 (1.818 to 1.794) in goal average. The final goal by Brown in a 3–0 win over Nottingham Forest on the final day of the season proved crucial, although ultimately it was Huddersfield's superior defensive record which had given them the advantage.

Following the title win, Chapman kept faith with his squad, making only one new signing – outside right Joey Williams – as they successfully defended their League title in 1924–25. Huddersfield started brightly but a poor run of form in October and November (in part caused by an injury to goalkeeper Ted Taylor) saw them drop to ninth at one point. Taylor was replaced by new signing Billy Mercer and a resurgence in form saw Huddersfield climb the table, regaining top spot with a 5–0 win over Arsenal in February, and eventually finishing two points clear of runners-up West Bromwich Albion. As a testament to Chapman's philosophy of relying on a strong defence, it was the first time a title-winning side had gone through a season without conceding more than two goals in any match.

=== Arsenal ===
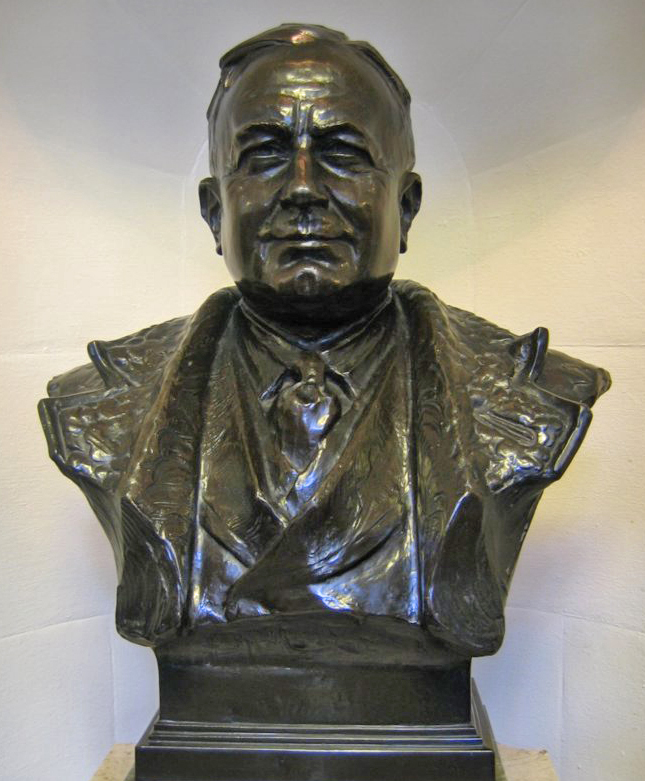
A bronze bust of Chapman stands inside Emirates Stadium as a tribute to his achievements at the club.

In the 1925 close season, Chapman had already set about improving his squad for Huddersfield to seek a third successive title (something which had never been achieved before). At the same time, Arsenal was looking to replace Leslie Knighton, who had been sacked. Arsenal chairman Sir Henry Norris placed an advertisement in the Athletic News:

Arsenal Football Club is open to receive applications for the position of TEAM MANAGER. He must be experienced and possess the highest qualifications for the post, both as to ability and personal character. Gentlemen whose sole ability to build up a good side depends on the payment of heavy and exhorbitant [sic] transfer fees need not apply.

Although Arsenal had been fighting relegation in both the two previous seasons, and despite the chairman's restriction on spending, Chapman nevertheless moved to Arsenal soon afterwards, attracted both by the London club's larger crowds and a salary of £2,000, double what he earned at Huddersfield Town. At Arsenal, Chapman immediately made an impact by signing 34-year-old Charlie Buchan, an England international and Sunderland's all-time record goalscorer, whom he made Arsenal captain.

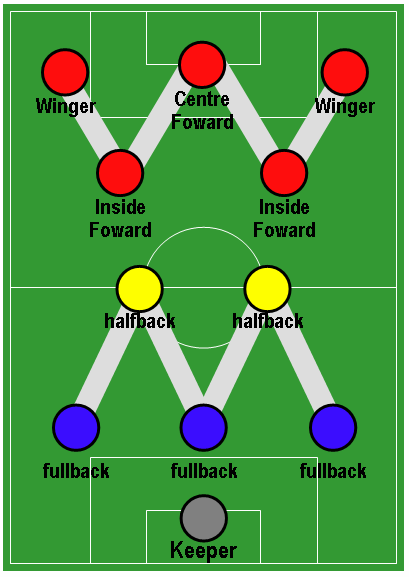
The "WM" formation that Chapman implemented at Arsenal

Chapman came to Arsenal promising to make them the "Newcastle of the South". Chapman and Buchan's arrival at the club also coincided with a change in the laws of the game in June 1925, that modified the offside law. The change had reduced the number of opposition players that an attacker needed between himself and the goal-line from three to two (including the goalkeeper). Buchan's idea, implemented by Chapman, was to move the centre half from a roaming position in midfield to a "stopper" position in defence. With the inside forwards brought back to help the midfield, this changed the usual formation from 2–3–5 to 3–4–3, or a "WM", so called after the shape it formed spelled out the letters. This meant the offside trap was now the responsibility of the single centre half, while the full backs were pushed wider to cover the wings.

Arsenal were by no means the only team to have come up with the idea of dropping the centre half into defence – Newcastle United beat Arsenal 7–0 that season employing such a system with Charlie Spencer at centre-half; Queen's Park and Tottenham Hotspur had also adopted similar systems. Chapman, however, was able to refine and improve on the idea better than his rivals, melding the tactical change with his own ideas on counter-attacking football, pacy wingers and a strong defence. Chapman himself summed it up by saying: "the most opportune time for scoring is immediately after repelling an attack, because opponents are then strung out in the wrong half of the field."

Arsenal went on to finish second in 1925–26, five points behind Chapman's old side Huddersfield Town, as they became the first club in England to win three titles in succession. It proved to be an early dawn for Arsenal, who spent most of the rest of the 1920s in mid-table, as Chapman took his time finding the right players to fit his new system, outlining a five-year plan for success. He retained relatively few players of his predecessor Knighton's era – Bob John, Alf Baker and Jimmy Brain being the exceptions – and instead looked to bring in talent from elsewhere.

In February 1926, he signed the pacy winger Joe Hulme, followed that summer by forward Jack Lambert and full-back Tom Parker, who would later succeed Buchan as captain. Although Arsenal's league form was indifferent, in 1927 they reached the FA Cup Final, their first, but lost 1–0 to Cardiff City after an error by goalkeeper Dan Lewis.

In the same year, Arsenal became embroiled in a scandal; footballers' pay at the time was limited by a maximum wage, but an FA inquiry found that Charlie Buchan had secretly received illegal payments from Arsenal as an incentive to sign for the club. Sir Henry Norris was indicted for his part and banned from football, but Chapman escaped punishment, and with the autocratic Norris replaced by the more benign Samuel Hill-Wood, Chapman's power and influence within the club increased, allowing him control over all aspects of the club's business. He persevered in building the team, strengthening his attacking lineup with the signings of David Jack in 1928, and Alex James and Cliff Bastin in 1929. As at his previous clubs, Chapman worked on improving the defence, notably through the signings of Herbie Roberts and Eddie Hapgood at centre half and left back respectively.

It was the signing of David Jack in particular that highlighted Chapman's cunning when it came to transfer negotiations. Bolton Wanderers had originally asked for a fee of £13,000, almost double the existing record. Bob Wall, Chapman's personal assistant at the time, later recounted the negotiations he made with Bolton's directors as follows:

We arrived at the hotel half-an-hour early. Chapman immediately went into the lounge bar. He called the waiter, placed two pound notes in his hand and said: "George, this is Mr Wall, my assistant. He will drink whisky and dry ginger. I will drink gin and tonic. We shall be joined by guests. They will drink whatever they like. See that our guests are given double of everything, but Mr Wall's whisky and dry ginger will contain no whisky, and my gin and tonic will contain no gin.

Chapman's subterfuge succeeded, as he managed to bargain the inebriated Bolton directors down to £10,890. He was less successful in his attempt to sign Jimmy McGrory from Celtic. He had set up a meeting with Celtic manager Willie Maley and young McGrory in summer 1928 when Maley and McGrory were on their way to a pilgrimage in Lourdes. A huge sum was offered (a blank cheque, some say) for the prolific McGrory, and Maley was more than ready to accept, for Celtic needed money to pay for its new stand. The deal fell through when McGrory, a homesick young Scotsman with an intense love for Celtic, refused to sign. He later (in 1935) broke the all-time goalscoring record.

Chapman had laid out a five-year plan for success in 1925, and it came to fruition exactly on schedule, as his Arsenal won their first major trophy in the 1930 FA Cup Final, beating his old side, Huddersfield Town, 2–0. Despite having finished only 14th in the League the same season, the win spurred Arsenal on and laid the foundations for a decade in which Arsenal would become the dominant team in England and eventually win five league titles.

Chapman had by now perfected Arsenal's ruthless, counter-attacking strategy. He employed a robust front line of Lambert supported by David Jack and Alex James as deep-lying inside forwards, filling the gap vacated by the movement of the centre half into defence; Alex James in particular, with his passing supplying the front men, became celebrated as the engine of the team during the coming decade. Chapman employed Bastin and Hulme as pacy wingers who could cut inside instead of hugging the touchline; they could either shoot for goal themselves or pick each other out if the centre forward was marked out of the game. With the exception of James, keeping and dwelling on the ball and individuality were discouraged in favour of a quick passing game, although Chapman still conceded: "All the men are expected to play to plan, but not so as to stifle individuality."

Chapman's tactics of fast-moving play meant the wing half line of John and Jones were now pushed in to cover central midfield, pivoting around the halfway line so that they could drop back to defend when necessary. Chapman was equally committed to a strong defence, saying that maintenance of a back line was "the rock bottom of football". Arsenal's defence were told to play deep and, with the support of the wing halves, fall back into their own penalty area when the opposition had the ball; this allowed the opposition plenty of possession in Arsenal's half, until they reached the 18-yard line and faced a massed defence. Once Arsenal regained the ball – usually through the centre half Herbie Roberts – the ball would be quickly passed forward and the wing halves would push up to support the attackers, meaning Arsenal could quickly commit as many as seven men forward as a unit to rapidly attack and try to score.

Chapman's system demanded a high level of fitness from his players, something which he strongly emphasised. He balanced the need for players suited to each task – in which his skill in spotting the right players and his extensive scouting network proved vital – with adapting his system to account for their abilities. Though highly effective, Chapman's fast, counter-attacking passing approach to football contrasted with how the game was traditionally played in England at the time, with its emphasis on dribbling, possession and dwelling on the ball, and thus brought accusations of "Lucky Arsenal" or "Boring Arsenal" from commentators and opposition. Nevertheless, despite the stereotype, in Arsenal's first title-winning season of 1930–31, they scored 127 goals in the League, which still stands as a club record.

Having won both League and Cup in separate seasons with two clubs, Chapman was determined to go one better and win the Double – which had not yet been won in the 20th century – in 1931–32 but ended up missing out on both, finishing second in the League behind Everton and losing the 1932 FA Cup Final controversially to Newcastle United, with Newcastle's equaliser coming after the ball had gone behind for a goal kick. Undeterred, Chapman kept faith with his side and launched a bid for the 1932–33 title. However, it was during this season that Arsenal suffered one of the most infamous defeats in their history.

In the FA Cup third round, Arsenal had been drawn against Walsall of the Third Division North. Arsenal, as the previous season's losing finalists and league leaders, were clear favourites to win the match. On the day, five of the Arsenal first team were out with injury or flu and had their places taken by reserves. Arsenal lost 2–0 in one of the greatest FA Cup upsets. Chapman was enraged by the result, and showed his ruthlessness by selling one player, Tommy Black, who had conceded a penalty in the game, to Plymouth Argyle within a week of the result; another, striker Charlie Walsh, was sold to Brentford a week later.

Despite the FA Cup setback, Arsenal bounced back in the League, and with the same scoring form as in 1930–31, finished the season having scored 118 League goals in total, including a 5–0 win over rivals Aston Villa in that season's title-deciding match. In the following close season, Chapman became the first professional manager in charge of England, albeit in an ad hoc unofficial capacity, for a summer tour of Europe. He did not have any input into the selection process, the team being determined by the FA's International Selection Committee, but did advise on tactics and gave pre-match team talks. Chapman was in charge for a friendly against Italy in Rome on 13 May 1933, which finished 1–1, and England's 4–0 win over Switzerland a week later.

Wary of his ageing Arsenal team and the club's inadequate reserves (as proven by the Walsall match), it was around this time that Chapman noted to club director George Allison: "The team's played out, Mr Allison, we must rebuild". Chapman started the process, signing Ray Bowden, Pat Beasley and Jimmy Dunne, and had converted the young George Male from left half to right back. Chapman would not live to see the end of the season, let alone complete the task of rebuilding his side. Arsenal went into 1933–34 looking to retain the title, and started consistently; they worked their way to the top of the league and were a comfortable four points clear after a goalless draw with Birmingham on 30 December 1933. This proved to be Chapman's last match in charge.

== Death ==
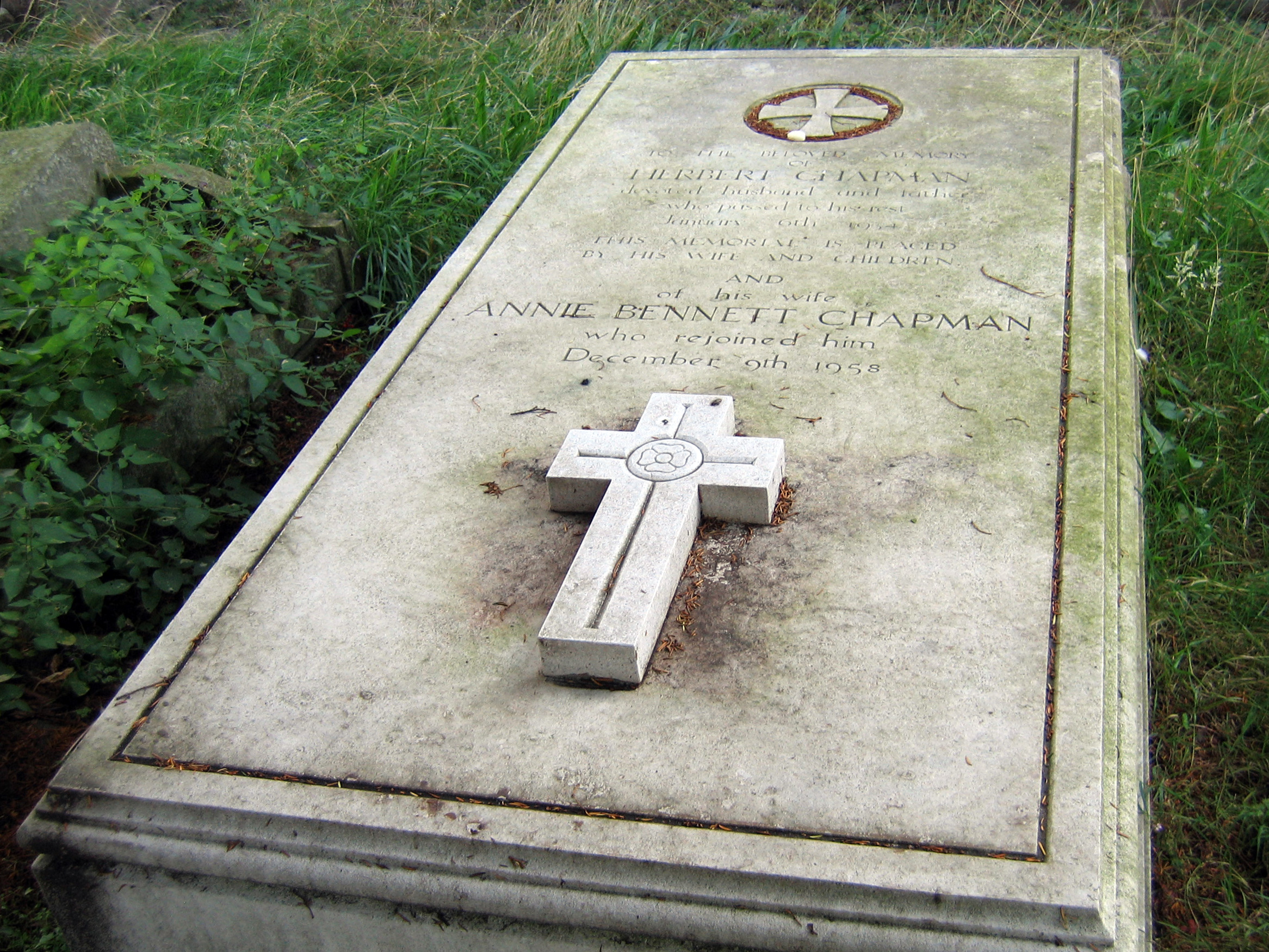
Chapman is buried in St Mary's Churchyard, Hendon, alongside his wife Annie, who died in 1958.

Chapman celebrated New Year in London before travelling north on a scouting trip to see Bury play Notts County on 1 January 1934. The following day, he travelled to his native Yorkshire to watch Sheffield Wednesday, Arsenal's next opponents, before spending a final night in his home town of Kiveton Park. He returned to London nursing a cold but was well enough to watch an Arsenal third-team match against Guildford City. Soon afterwards, his illness suddenly worsened; pneumonia set in, and Chapman quickly succumbed. He died in the early hours of 6 January 1934 at his home in Hendon. He was buried four days later in St Mary's Churchyard, Hendon.

Chapman was survived by a widow, Annie, two sons, Ken (born 1908) and Bruce (born 1911), and two daughters, Molly (born 1915) and Joyce (born 1919). Ken was a rugby union player for Harlequins, and later served as president of the Rugby Football Union.

== Legacy ==
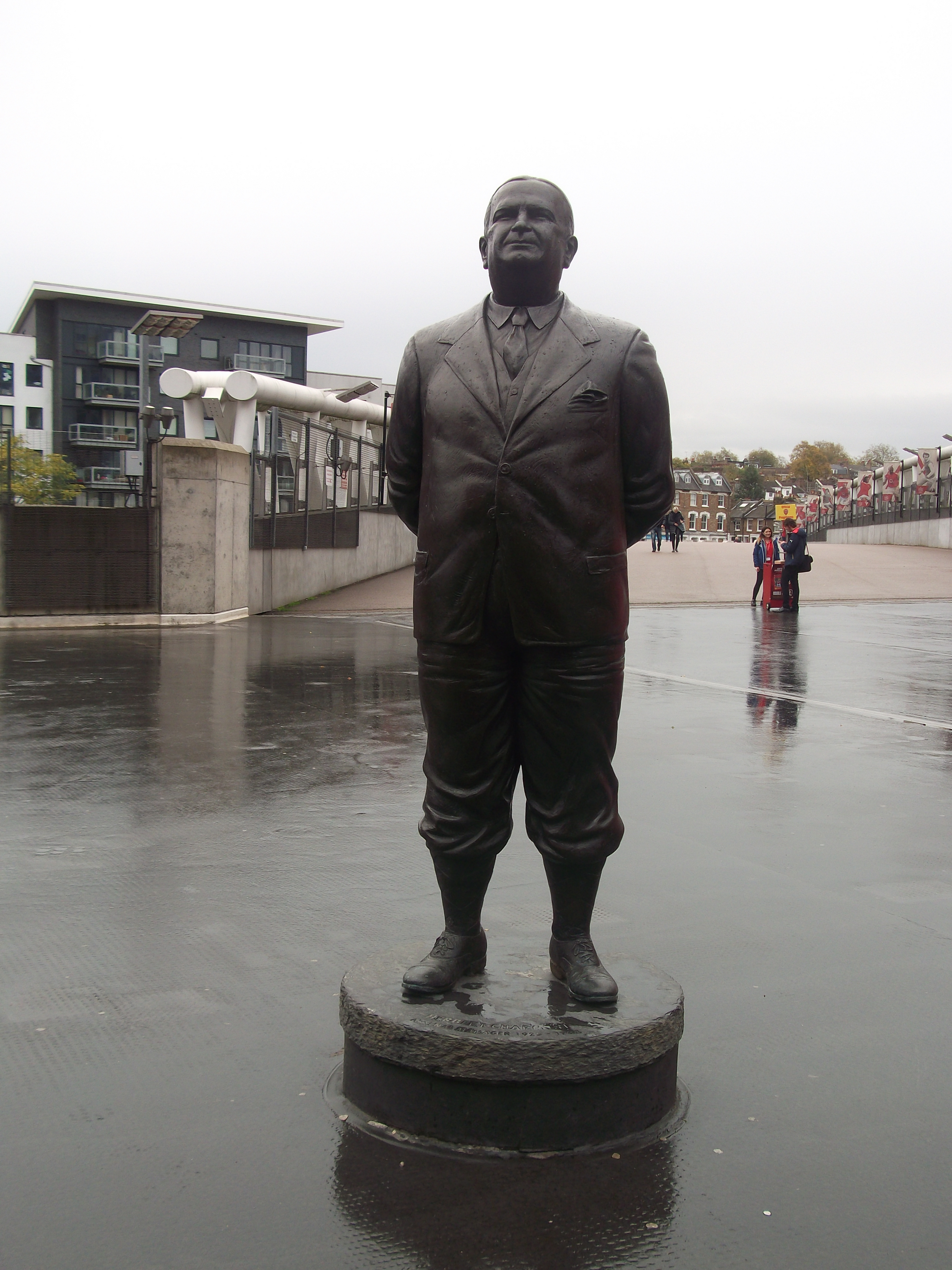
Statue of Chapman outside the Emirates Stadium

He is credited with transforming Arsenal into one of English football's leading clubs. Chapman introduced tactical innovations, most notably the WM formation, developed in response to the 1925 change to the offside law. The system involved three defenders, two half-backs, two inside-forwards and three forwards, creating a distinctive W and M shape across the pitch. It provided greater defensive stability while maintaining attacking options and became one of the most influential tactical systems in football, shaping the development of formations used in later decades.

Chapman was one of the first football managers in the modern sense of the word, taking full charge of the team, rather than letting board members pick the side. As well as his tactical innovations, he was a strong believer in physical fitness in football – he instituted a strict training regime and the use of physiotherapists and masseurs. He encouraged his players to openly discuss tactics and the game, instituting weekly team meetings at his clubs, and encouraged them to socialise in extra-curricular activities such as golf. He wrote regularly on football for the Sunday Express newspaper, and a collection of his writings was published after his death in a book, entitled Herbert Chapman on Football.

Unlike many of his contemporaries in Britain, Chapman was a fan of the continental game and counted among his friends Hugo Meisl and Jimmy Hogan, coaches of the Austrian "Wunderteam" of the 1930s. As long ago as 1909, he had taken his Northampton side on a tour of Germany to play 1. FC Nürnberg, and at Arsenal he had instituted an ongoing series of home-and-away friendlies against the likes of Racing Club de Paris. Chapman had proposed a Europe-wide club competition more than twenty years before the European Cup was instituted, and regularly took his teams abroad to play foreign sides. He was one of the first managers to consider signing black and foreign players; as well as signing Walter Tull, one of the first black professionals in the game, for Northampton Town in 1911, he attempted to recruit Austrian international goalkeeper Rudy Hiden for Arsenal in 1930, but was blocked by the Ministry of Labour, after protests from the Players' Union and the Football League. However, in the same year he did succeed in signing Gerard Keyser, the first Dutchman to play English league football, as an amateur, and Hiden was signed by Jimmy Hogan for Racing Club de Paris.

After attending a night-time match in Belgium in 1930 with his friend Hugo Meisl, Chapman became an early advocate of floodlights. He had lights installed in Highbury's new West Stand when it was constructed in 1932; however, they were used only for training, and Arsenal would have to wait until the 1950s for their officially sanctioned use in matches. Chapman oversaw much of the development of Highbury in the early 1930s, including the building of the West Stand and the addition of a clock which was eventually placed by the south terrace, giving it the name of the "Clock End". He is also credited with being behind the renaming of London Underground's Gillespie Road station to Arsenal. He even designed the scoreboard and turnstiles at the stadium.

Chapman advocated the use of white footballs and numbered shirts, as well as adding hoops to Arsenal's socks to make it easier for players to pick each other out. He later made a further change to Arsenal's kit, adding white sleeves to the previously all-red shirt and brightening the colour, before a match against Liverpool on 4 March 1933; the same kit theme of red with white sleeves or trim survives to this day. The tradition of both teams walking out together at the FA Cup Final was started in 1930 due to Chapman's involvement with both clubs, and has continued since.

== Career statistics ==
Managerial record by team and tenure
Team	From	To	Record				
Team	From	To	P	W	D	L	Win %
Northampton Town	1 August 1907	1 August 1912	212	106	44	62	50.00
Leeds City	1 August 1912	9 December 1918	241	123	44	74	51.04
Huddersfield Town	31 March 1921	11 June 1925	194	95	53	46	48.97
Arsenal	11 June 1925	6 January 1934	411	204	97	110	49.64
			1,058	528	238	292	49.91

== Honours ==
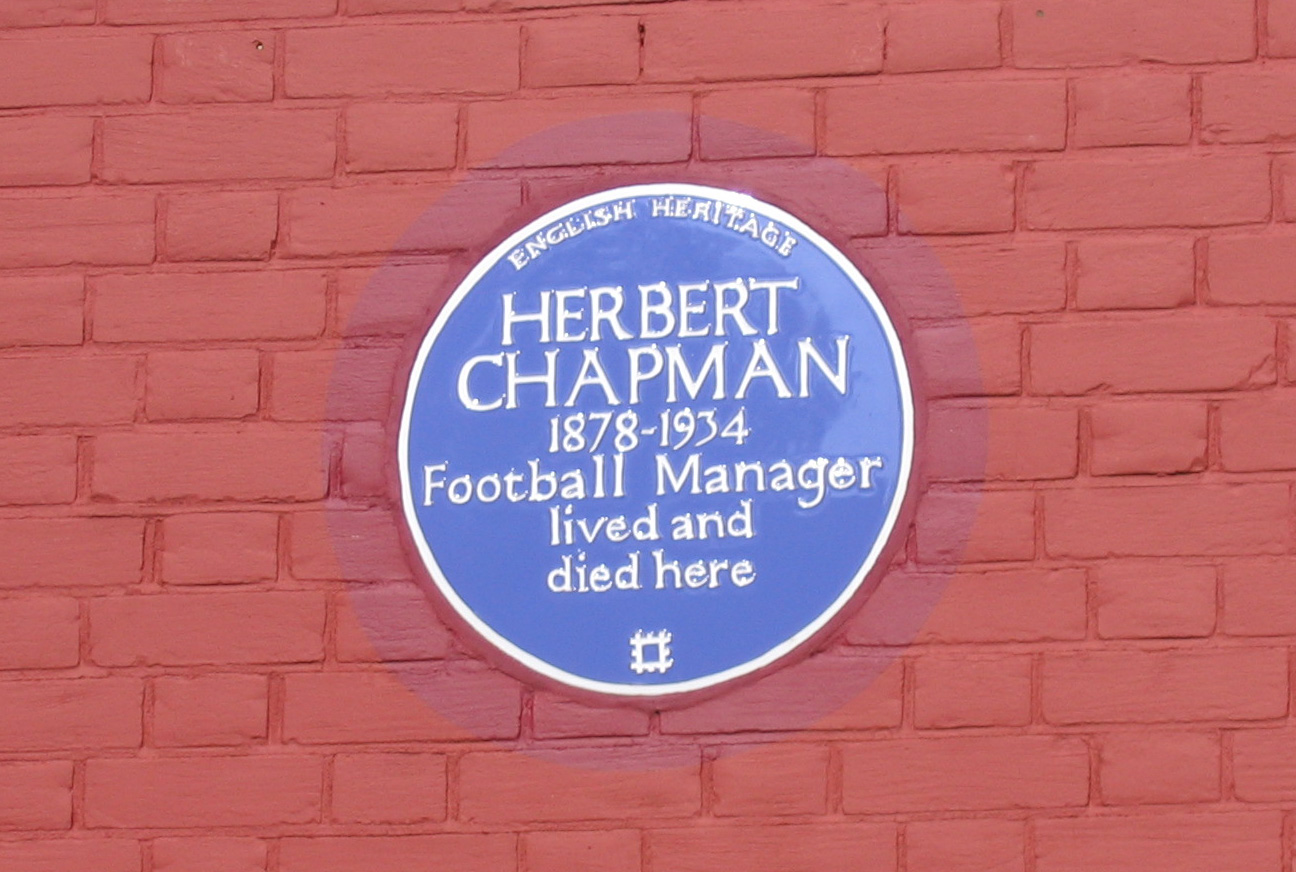
The English Heritage blue plaque outside Chapman's former residence in Hendon, the first such plaque to commemorate a football player or manager

Although he did not win any major honours as a player, as a manager Chapman won a Southern League title in 1908–09 with Northampton Town, four Football League titles (1923–24 and 1924–25 with Huddersfield Town, 1930–31 and 1932–33 with Arsenal) and two FA Cups (1921–22 with Huddersfield Town, 1929–30 with Arsenal). After his death the team he had built at Arsenal, under his successors Joe Shaw and George Allison, went on to win the 1933–34 and 1934–35 titles, emulating his Huddersfield Town team by completing a hat-trick. No team was to repeat the feat until Liverpool between 1982 and 1984. Chapman was honorary president of Scottish amateur football club Chirnside United until his death in 1934.

In 2003, Chapman was inducted into the English Football Hall of Fame in recognition of his impact as a manager. An English Heritage blue plaque commemorating Chapman was unveiled in March 2005, at the house in Hendon where Chapman lived from 1926 until his death. Chapman was the first footballer or football manager to be commemorated in this way by English Heritage. In 2004, on the seventieth anniversary of his death, The Sunday Times named him the greatest British manager of all time in a poll.

In tribute to his achievements at Arsenal, a bronze bust of Chapman, sculpted by Jacob Epstein resided inside the marble halls of the East Stand of Arsenal Stadium, Highbury until its closure in 2006, and was subsequently returned to Highbury to form part of the concierge entrance in the Grade II-Listed East Stand to the Highbury Square development. A replica sits in the Directors' Entrance at Emirates Stadium; he is one of only two Arsenal managers to be honoured this way, the other being Arsène Wenger. Furthermore, Arsenal's white away kit for the 2007–08 season was dedicated to Chapman and his achievements.

Huddersfield Town were presented with a replica of Chapman's bust by Arsenal, to celebrate their centenary in 2008. Additionally, as part of their centennial, Huddersfield contested the inaugural Herbert Chapman Trophy against Arsenal at the Galpharm Stadium on 6 August 2008, which Arsenal won 2–1.

On 9 December 2011, Arsenal unveiled a statue of Chapman outside Emirates Stadium in celebration of the club's 125th anniversary. The club also unveiled statues of former players Tony Adams and Thierry Henry.

=== Managerial ===
Northampton Town

- Southern League: 1908–09

Huddersfield Town

- Football League First Division: 1923–24, 1924–25
- FA Cup: 1921–22
- FA Charity Shield: 1922

Arsenal

- Football League First Division: 1930–31, 1932–33
- FA Cup: 1929–30; runner-up: 1931–32
- FA Charity Shield: 1930, 1931, 1933

Individual

- World Soccer 9th Greatest Manager of All Time: 2013
- France Football 24th Greatest Manager of All Time: 2019

== See also ==
- List of English football championship-winning managers
