= Tom Penn (footballer) =

English footballer (1897–1978)

Personal information
- Full name: Thomas Penn
- Date of birth: 11 October 1897
- Place of birth: Heath Common, Yorkshire, England
- Date of death: 1978 (aged 80–81)
- Height: 5 ft 10 in (1.78 m)
- Position: Full back

Senior career*
Years	Team	Apps	(Gls)
–	Methley Perseverance		
–	Altofts West Riding Colliery		
1925–1927	Bristol City	6	(0)
1927–1928	Darlington	14	(0)
1928–1929	Gainsborough Trinity		
1929–1931	Swindon Town	27	(0)
1931–1932	Yeovil & Petters United		
1932–1933	Gainsborough Trinity		
1933–1934	Bath City		
- * Club domestic league appearances and goals

Thomas Penn (11 October 1897 – 1978) was an English footballer who played as a full back in the Football League for Bristol City, Darlington and Swindon Town. He also played non-league football for Methley Perseverance, Altofts West Riding Colliery, Gainsborough Trinity, Yeovil & Petters United and Bath City.

== Life and career ==
Penn was born in Heath Common, West Riding of Yorkshire, in 1897. He played football for nearby Methley Perseverance and Altofts West Riding Colliery before signing for Football League Second Division club Bristol City in 1925. He appeared in six Football League games in his first season, but in his second, his appearances were restricted to the reserve team in the Western and Southern Leagues. In July 1927, he joined Darlington, newly relegated to the Third Division North. He went straight into the team, had a run of 7 matches at left back before losing his place, first to Tommy Greaves and then to James Mellon, and finished the season with 16 appearances, 14 in the league and 2 in the FA Cup.

Penn joined Midland League club Gainsborough Trinity ahead of the 1928–29 season, and returned to the Football League with Swindon Town at the end of it. He came into the side to replace the ageing Wally Dickinson, and played regularly until April 1930, but appeared only once for the first team in 1930–31. Penn joined Southern League Yeovil & Petters United on trial in November 1931 and, although initially reluctant to accept the terms offered, signed a contract in January 1932. He remained with the club until the end of the season before returning to Gainsborough for 1932–33. Penn made one first-team appearance for Bath City during the 1933–34 season.

He died in 1978, aged 80 or 81.
