= Rochdale A.F.C. (1896) =

Rochdale (1896)
- Full name: Rochdale Association Football Club
- Founded: 1896
- Dissolved: 1901
- Ground: Rochdale Athletic Grounds (1896–1900), Spotland (1900–01)
Home colours

Rochdale A.F.C. was a football club from Rochdale, Lancashire, which existed for five years around the turn of the 20th century. The club have no connection with the present day Rochdale A.F.C. other than the name and ground, which thus makes the current club a spiritual successor.

== History ==
In the late 19th century the predominant team sport in Rochdale was rugby, in contrast to nearby towns such as Bury and Bolton where association football was the dominant code. The town did not have a professional association football club until 1896, when the Rochdale Athletic Club and the Rochdale Athletic Ground Company formed Rochdale A.F.C.

Previously, there had been a number of amateur sides, including the original Rochdale A.F.C. side formed in 1894 by the Athletic Club. This side played in the Middleton & District League for the 1894/95 season, before folding in the summer of 1895. Many of the players left to join the Rochdale Wanderers club.

The earliest association side from Rochdale was Rochdale Clifford, who played from 1887, having played cricket for some seasons before that. Rochdale Clifford were a strong amateur side. In the 1891/92 season they played in both the Manchester Junior Cup and the Lancashire Junior Cup.

The 1896 Rochdale A.F.C. club joined the Lancashire Combination for the 1896–97 season, finishing sixth. The following year they transferred to the Lancashire League, but met with less success, finishing twelfth out of fourteen teams in 1897–98. The club also entered the FA Cup for the first time, reaching the second qualifying round. During this season future Huddersfield Town and Arsenal manager Herbert Chapman played for the club, before moving on to Grimsby Town

In the next two seasons the club continued to dwell in the lower reaches of the Lancashire League, with ninth place in 1899–1900 their highest finish. The club was then forced to move grounds, which coincided with financial hardship, and the team withdrew from the Lancashire League. The club entered the following season's FA Cup, winning two ties, but were unable to field a team for their third qualifying round tie against Workington. The club folded on 1 January 1901, immediately succeeded by a new side, Rochdale Town.

== Colours ==
The club wore royal blue jerseys.

== Ground ==
The club originally played at the Athletic Grounds, and left to play at St. Clement's Playing Fields, the ground now known as Spotland, at the end of the 1899–1900 season.
