= Ken Friar =

English football executive (1934–2026)

Ken Friar OBE
- Ken Friar statue at the Emirates Stadium
- Born: Kenneth John Friar; 13 August 1934; Islington, London, England
- Died: 13 October 2026 (aged 92)
- Title: Board member, managing director and secretary of Arsenal Football Club
- Spouse: Gwendoline Maureen Deacon (m. 1957; died 2020)
- Children: 2

Kenneth John Friar OBE (13 August 1934 – 13 October 2026) was an English football executive. He was a board member, the managing director and secretary of Arsenal Football Club. He was appointed president-for-life of the club in September 2020.

== Early life and career ==
Ken Friar was born in Islington on 13 August 1934. He was educated at St John's School, Highbury and Highbury County Grammar School after passing the eleven-plus. Friar began working at Arsenal part-time as a 12-year-old in 1946 after he kicked a football under the car of the Arsenal manager George Allison. Allison offered Friar a job as a matchday messenger boy at Arsenal after being impressed with his enthusiasm. He left school in 1950 and started work in the club's box office. Friar rose through the club ranks and became company secretary replacing Bob Wall in January 1973. During this time, he took part in discussions held in the 1970s between the boards of Arsenal and rivals Tottenham Hotspur to share a new stadium at Alexandra Palace.

On 17 February 1983, Friar was appointed managing director by chairman Peter Hill-Wood, a role he lasted in until 2000. During this time, he had taken an active role in negotiating manager and player contracts as well as fostering Arsenal's links with the community and supporter groups, in addition to successfully arguing against crowd-fencing at Highbury. He stepped down from this role to concentrate on the club's move to the Emirates Stadium and served on the board until September 2020 when he retired. On 1 May 2008, it was announced that he had become acting managing director on the resignation of Keith Edelman prior to the appointment of Ivan Gazidis.

He was appointed Officer of the Order of the British Empire (OBE) in the 2000 Birthday Honours for services to association football. The London Borough of Islington also awarded him the freedom of the borough in 2004.

As of 27 March 2007, he owned 47 shares representing 0.07% of Arsenal Football Club after he transferred 147 to the then Arsenal chairman Peter Hill-Wood.

As of 7 September 2015, he owned one share representing 0.0016% of Arsenal Football Club; Ivan Gazidis also owns one share, with the remaining shares being owned by Arsenal (AFC Holdings) Limited.

On 14 April 2011, The North Bridge, which joins Arsenal's Emirates Stadium to Arsenal tube station, was renamed The Ken Friar Bridge. At a short ceremony attended by Friar himself, family, friends and Club staff, a statue was unveiled at the end of the bridge, opposite the Arsenal Museum at the north end of the stadium. The statue depicts Friar playing football as a youngster in 1945 in front of the old Highbury Stadium. In 2020, he retired from the board and was named as Arsenal's president for life.

== Personal life and death ==
Friar married Gwendoline Maureen Deacon in 1957. They had a son and daughter. Gwendoline died of pancreatic cancer on 29 December 2020, aged 88. Friar died on 13 October 2026, aged 92.

Sporting positions
Preceded by Bob Wall	Arsenal F.C. Secretary; 1973–2000	Succeeded by Keith Edelman
Preceded by –	Arsenal F.C. managing director 1983–2000	Succeeded by Keith Edelman
