= Bob Wall (football administrator) =

English football administrator

William Robert Wall (25 February 1912 – 23 March 1981) was an English football administrator. He spent his entire career with Arsenal Football Club.

Born in Hackney, he went to school in the Highbury area and attended Finsbury Park commercial college. He was married to Clare (née Nightingale) until his death in 1981. They didn't have any children. He joined Arsenal in 1928 as a clerical worker, handling the club's box office and manager Herbert Chapman's personal correspondence. He soon gained Chapman's trust and assisted with transfer deals. In his very first deal at Chapman's side, when Chapman signed David Jack from Bolton Wanderers, Wall would later recall that Chapman made sure the Bolton directors' drinks contained double measures while his own had no alcohol whatsoever. When the Bolton directors got very drunk, Chapman managed to haggle down the fee to a price he considered a bargain.

Wall continued to work for Arsenal for nearly 50 years. He became assistant secretary in 1950 and secretary of Arsenal Football Club six years later. After secretary-manager Tom Whittaker died, the club decided to split the role, with Jack Crayston taking over the role of manager. Described by Arsenal captain Frank McLintock as "an authoritarian personality", Wall would eventually come to be effectively in charge of the club's day-to-day running with the board of directors taking a backseat role.

In 1973, Wall became Arsenal's general manager. Ken Friar succeeded him as secretary. In 1969, Wall published his own account of life at the club in Arsenal from the Heart (ISBN 0285502611). He retired from his position 1977, accepting a position on the club's board that he retained until his death.
