= Jimmy Brain =

English footballer (1900–1971)

Personal information
- Full name: James Brain
- Date of birth: 11 September 1900
- Place of birth: Bristol, England
- Date of death: 1971 (aged 70–71)
- Place of death: Barnet, London, England
- Height: 5 ft 9 in (1.75 m)
- Position: Centre forward

Senior career*
Years	Team	Apps	(Gls)
?–1923	Ton Pentre		
1923–1931	Arsenal	204	(125)
1931–1934	Tottenham Hotspur	45	(10)
1934–1937	Swansea Town	51	(25)
1937–1939	Bristol City	32	(9)
1939–1940	Cheltenham Town		

Managerial career
- 1939–?: King's Lynn
- 1937–1948: Cheltenham Town
- * Club domestic league appearances and goals

James Brain (11 September 1900 – 1971) was an English professional football manager and player who played as a centre forward.

== Career ==
Born in Bristol, Brain started his career playing in Wales, having an unsuccessful trial at Cardiff City, before gaining a regular place at Ton Pentre. In 1923, he moved to Arsenal, and in his eight years with Arsenal became one of the club's most successful goalscorers. After a year in the reserve side, Brain started his Arsenal first-team career with a goal on his debut, a 1–0 win against local rivals Tottenham Hotspur on 25 October 1924.

Brain was a prolific striker throughout his career, and was the club's top scorer for four seasons in a row, from 1924–25 to 1928–29; this included 39 goals in the 1925–26 season (second only to Ted Drake's haul of 45 in 1934–35), which included four hat tricks. The next season, 1926–27, Brain scored 34 goals, this haul including two four-goal tallies against Sheffield Wednesday and Burnley. Brain's goalscoring feats helped Arsenal reach their first FA Cup final, in 1926–27, though a mistake by goalkeeper Dan Lewis meant Arsenal lost 1–0 to Cardiff City.

However Brain's form dropped and in 1929–30 he lost out in competing for the front spot with Jack Lambert, David Jack and Dave Halliday all getting the nod ahead of him, meaning Brain only played six league matches this season. Brain therefore missed Arsenal' 1930 Cup final win over Huddersfield Town; Jack and Lambert led the line that day. He played in Arsenal's 2–1 victory over Sheffield Wednesday in the Charity Shield at Stamford Bridge in October 1930. The following season, 1930–31, Brain finally won a medal after playing sixteen matches (scoring four goals) in Arsenal's very first First Division title-winning season. Brain's final appearance in an Arsenal shirt was a 2–0 win over Sheffield Wednesday on 21 March 1931.

By now, Brain's age was catching up with him, and he had been overtaken in the goalscoring stakes by both Lambert and Jack. He left Arsenal for Tottenham for £2,500 in September 1931, becoming one of the few players to have moved directly between the two rival clubs. In total, he scored 139 goals in 232 appearances for Arsenal, making him Arsenal' joint-fifth top scorer of all time, and he was the first player ever to score 100 goals for the club, a feat he achieved in a 6–3 win over Liverpool on 7 March 1928. However, he never played for England; he managed to secure a trial for the national team but was never actually selected.

By the time Brain had joined Spurs he was in his thirties, and only played 47 times for them, scoring 10 goals, before leaving in 1934. He played his final years out at Swansea Town and Bristol City. After retiring as a player, Brain managed first King's Lynn and then Cheltenham Town from 1937 until 1948. During the war Brain briefly turned out for Cheltenham Town. He returned to his role as Cheltenham Town manager until 1948, after which he retired completely from football. He died in 1971, at the age of 71.

== Honours ==
=== Player ===
Arsenal

- Football League First Division: 1930–31
- FA Charity Shield: 1930
- FA Cup runner-up: 1926–27

=== Manager ===
Cheltenham Town

- Gloucestershire Northern Senior Professional Cup: 1939–40
