= David Jack =

English footballer and manager

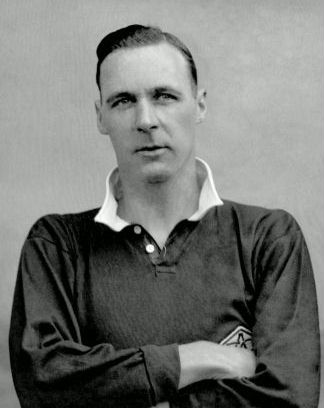

Personal information
- Full name: David Bone Nightingale Jack
- Date of birth: 3 April 1898
- Place of birth: Bolton, Lancashire, England
- Date of death: 10 September 1958 (aged 60)
- Place of death: Lambeth, London, England
- Height: 5 ft 10 1/2 in (1.79 m)
- Position: Inside forward

Senior career*
| Years | Team | Apps | (Gls) |
| 1919–1920 | Plymouth Argyle | 45 | (10) |
| 1920–1928 | Bolton Wanderers | 295 | (144) |
| 1928–1934 | Arsenal | 208 | (124) |
| Total | | 521 | (267) |

International career
| 1924–1932 | England | 9 | (3) |

Managerial career
- 1934–1940: Southend United
- 1944–1952: Middlesbrough
- 1953–1955: Shelbourne
- * Club domestic league appearances and goals

David Bone Nightingale Jack (3 April 1898 – 10 September 1958) was an English footballer who played as an inside forward. He scored 267 goals from 490 appearances in the Football League playing for Plymouth Argyle, Bolton Wanderers and Arsenal. He was the first footballer to be transferred for a fee in excess of £10,000, was the first to score at Wembley – in the 1923 FA Cup Final – and was capped nine times for England. After retiring as a player, he managed Southend United, Middlesbrough and Shelbourne.

== Personal life ==
Jack was born in Bolton, Lancashire, in 1898, the son of Scottish footballer Bob Jack and his wife Georgina Nightingale. He had two brothers, Rollo and Donald, who also played football.

Jack was married to Kathleen. Their son, also named David, became a journalist and writer who chaired both the Football Writers' Association and its Australian counterpart, the Australian Soccer Press Association. Jack died in St Thomas' Hospital, London, in 1958 at the age of 60.

He served in the Royal Navy during the First World War.

== Playing career ==
An inside forward, Jack started his senior career with his father's club, Plymouth Argyle, after the war. He played in the Southern League in 1919–20, and was a member of Plymouth's team for their first match in the newly formed Football League Third Division in 1920–21. He scored 15 goals in 48 appearances in all competitions. In late 1920 he returned to the town of his birth, signing for Bolton Wanderers for a fee of £3,500. He spent eight seasons with the Trotters, forming a formidable partnership with Joe Smith, and between them they scored more than 300 goals. While with Bolton, he made history by being the first person to score a goal at Wembley Stadium, in the 1923 FA Cup Final; Bolton won 2–0 and Jack earned his first medal.

A year later, he won his first England cap, in a 2–1 defeat against Wales on 3 March 1924. In eight years he played nine times for his country – four times as captain – and scored three goals. He continued to have success with Bolton, winning the FA Cup again in 1925–26, scoring the only goal in a 1–0 win over Manchester City. He was the club's top scorer for five of the eight seasons he was there, scoring 144 goals in 295 league matches. As of 2017, he remains Bolton's third highest goalscorer of all time, with 161 goals from 324 senior matches.

In 1928, with Bolton in financial trouble, Herbert Chapman's Arsenal made Jack the first five-digit signing in world football, almost double the previous record; the final fee paid was £10,647 10 shillings. According to Bob Wall, Chapman negotiated the transfer with Bolton's representatives in a hotel bar, his tactic being to drink gin and tonics without any gin in them, while asking the waiter to double the alcohol served to the other side. Chapman remained sober while the Bolton representatives got very drunk, and managed to haggle down the fee to a price he considered a bargain.

Intended as a replacement for retired captain Charlie Buchan, Jack was a success at Highbury. He made his debut against Newcastle United on 20 October 1928, and became a regular straight away. He was the club's top scorer for the 1928–29 season. Although less prolific than centre-forward Jack Lambert, he still scored important goals, including the one in the 1929–30 FA Cup semi-final against Hull City which sent Arsenal through to the final in which Arsenal beat Huddersfield Town 2–0 and Jack became the first player to win the Cup at Wembley with two different clubs. He played in Arsenal's 2–1 victory over Sheffield Wednesday in the Charity Shield at Stamford Bridge in October 1930.

Jack continued to feature for Arsenal through the early 1930s, recording a personal best of 34 goals in their First Division-winning season of 1930–31. He won two more titles in 1932–33 and 1933–34. By the time of the latter he was in his mid-30s and reaching the end of his career; competition for his place from new signing Ray Bowden meant Jack played only 16 matches that season. He retired soon after winning his third league medal, in May 1934. Altogether he scored 124 times in 208 matches for Arsenal, making him, as of 2017 the tenth-highest goalscorer in the club's history.

He is one of only three players to score more than 100 English top-flight league goals for two different clubs, along with Jimmy Greaves and Alan Shearer.

== Managerial career ==
After retiring from playing, Jack went on to manage Southend United from May 1934 to August 1940 and then Middlesbrough from November 1944 to April 1952. He also managed League of Ireland side Shelbourne from August 1953 to April 1955.

== Career statistics ==
Appearances and goals by club, season and competition
| Club | Season | League | | | FA Cup | | Charity Shield | | Total | |
| Club | Season | Division | Apps | Goals | Apps | Goals | Apps | Goals | Apps | Goals |
|---|---|---|---|---|---|---|---|---|---|---|
| Plymouth Argyle | 1919–20 | Southern League | 31 | 7 | 3 | 5 | 0 | 0 | 34 | 12 |
| Plymouth Argyle | 1920–21 | Third Division South | 14 | 3 | 0 | 0 | 0 | 0 | 14 | 3 |
| Plymouth Argyle | Total | | 45 | 10 | 3 | 5 | 0 | 0 | 48 | 15 |
| Bolton Wanderers | 1920–21 | First Division | 19 | 4 | 0 | 0 | 0 | 0 | 19 | 4 |
| Bolton Wanderers | 1921–22 | First Division | 39 | 24 | 2 | 0 | 0 | 0 | 41 | 24 |
| Bolton Wanderers | 1922–23 | First Division | 41 | 11 | 7 | 8 | 0 | 0 | 48 | 19 |
| Bolton Wanderers | 1923–24 | First Division | 39 | 24 | 3 | 3 | 0 | 0 | 42 | 27 |
| Bolton Wanderers | 1924–25 | First Division | 42 | 26 | 3 | 1 | 0 | 0 | 45 | 27 |
| Bolton Wanderers | 1925–26 | First Division | 37 | 14 | 8 | 4 | 0 | 0 | 45 | 18 |
| Bolton Wanderers | 1926–27 | First Division | 38 | 16 | 4 | 1 | 0 | 0 | 42 | 17 |
| Bolton Wanderers | 1927–28 | First Division | 33 | 24 | 2 | 0 | 0 | 0 | 35 | 24 |
| Bolton Wanderers | 1928–29 | First Division | 7 | 1 | 0 | 0 | 0 | 0 | 7 | 1 |
| Bolton Wanderers | Total | | 295 | 144 | 29 | 17 | 0 | 0 | 324 | 161 |
| Arsenal | 1928–29 | First Division | 31 | 25 | 5 | 1 | 0 | 0 | 36 | 26 |
| Arsenal | 1929–30 | First Division | 33 | 13 | 8 | 3 | 0 | 0 | 41 | 16 |
| Arsenal | 1930–31 | First Division | 35 | 31 | 3 | 2 | 1 | 1 | 39 | 34 |
| Arsenal | 1931–32 | First Division | 34 | 21 | 6 | 3 | 1 | 0 | 41 | 24 |
| Arsenal | 1932–33 | First Division | 34 | 18 | 1 | 0 | 0 | 0 | 35 | 18 |
| Arsenal | 1933–34 | First Division | 14 | 5 | 2 | 1 | 0 | 0 | 16 | 6 |
| Arsenal | Total | | 181 | 113 | 25 | 10 | 2 | 1 | 208 | 124 |
| Career total | | | 521 | 267 | 57 | 32 | 2 | 1 | 580 | 300 |

- 1923 Charity Shield appearance for Professionals v Amateurs
- 1926 Charity Shield appearance for Professionals v Amateurs

== Honours ==
Professionals

- FA Charity Shield: 1923

Bolton Wanderers

- FA Cup: 1922–23, 1925–26

Arsenal

- Football League First Division: 1930–31, 1932–33, 1933–34
- FA Cup: 1929–30; runner-up: 1931–32
- FA Charity Shield: 1930, 1931

== See also ==
- List of English football first tier top scorers
- List of footballers in England by number of league goals
- List of most expensive association football transfers
