= Bill Johnstone (Scottish footballer) =

Scottish footballer

Personal information
- Full name: William Johnstone
- Date of birth: 18 May 1901
- Place of birth: Markinch, Scotland
- Date of death: 1975 (aged 73–74)
- Positions: Inside forward; centre forward

Senior career*
Years	Team	Apps	(Gls)
–	Rosslyn Juniors		
1921–1922	King's Park	11	(1)
1922–1926	Clyde	98	(56)
1926–1929	Reading	78	(34)
1929–1931	Arsenal	9	(4)
1931–1933	Oldham Athletic	68	(28)
1933–1935	Clyde	56	(22)
1935–1936	Northwich Victoria		
- * Club domestic league appearances and goals

William Johnstone (18 May 1901 – 1975) was a Scottish footballer who played as an inside forward or centre forward. His clubs included King's Park and Clyde (two spells) in Scotland, and Reading, Arsenal and Oldham Athletic in England.

While at Clyde, he was selected for the Glasgow FA's annual challenge match against Sheffield in September 1926, scoring twice, and moved to Reading a few weeks later. In his first season with the Royals, he had a prominent role in the club's run to the FA Cup semi-final in 1926–27, and scored the winning goal in a giant-killing victory over reigning English champions Sheffield Wednesday in the same competition two years later.

Signed by Arsenal in summer 1929, technically he was a member of the Gunners' squad that won the Football League title in 1930–31, but he made only two appearances in that campaign before moving on to second-level Oldham mid-season, having failed in his efforts to break into what was a very strong attacking line-up at Highbury.
