= George Waterfield =

English footballer

Personal information
- Full name: George Smith Waterfield
- Date of birth: 2 June 1901
- Place of birth: Swinton, England
- Date of death: 1988 (aged 86–87)
- Height: 5 ft 9 in (1.75 m)
- Position: Defender

Senior career*
| Years | Team | Apps | (Gls) |
| 1923–1935 | Burnley | 371 | (5) |
| 1935–1936 | Crystal Palace | 2 | (0) |
- Nelson
| Total | | 373 | (5) |

International career
| 1927 | England | 1 | (0) |
- * Club domestic league appearances and goals

George Smith Waterfield (2 June 1901 – 1988) was an English professional footballer who played as a defender.
