= Methley Perseverance F.C. =

Defunct football team from Yorkshire, England

Coordinates: 53.740°N 1.391°W

Methley Perseverance
- Full name: Methley Perseverance Football Club

Methley Perseverance F.C. was an English football club based in Methley, West Yorkshire.

== History ==
The club won the Yorkshire Football League title in 1924 and 1926.
