= 1929–30 FA Cup =

Tournament details
- Country: England; Wales

Final positions
- Champions: Arsenal (1st title)
- Runners-up: Huddersfield Town

The 1929–30 FA Cup was the 55th season of the world's oldest football cup competition, the Football Association Challenge Cup, commonly known as the FA Cup. Arsenal won the competition for the first time, beating Huddersfield Town 2–0 in the final at Wembley.

First Division side Bolton Wanderers were the defending champions, but were eliminated in the third round by Birmingham.

Matches were scheduled to be played at the stadium of the team named first on the date specified for each round, which was always a Saturday. Some matches, however, might be rescheduled for other days if there were clashes with games for other competitions or the weather was inclement. If scores were level after 90 minutes had been played, a replay would take place at the stadium of the second-named team later the same week. If the replayed match was drawn further replays would be held until a winner was determined. If scores were level after 90 minutes had been played in a replay, a 30-minute period of extra time would be played.

== Calendar ==
Round	Date
Extra preliminary round	Saturday 7 September 1929
Preliminary round	Saturday 31 September 1929
First round qualifying	Saturday 5 October 1929
Second round qualifying	Saturday 19 October 1929
Third round qualifying	Saturday 2 November 1929
Fourth round qualifying	Saturday 16 November 1929
First round proper	Saturday 30 November 1929
Second round proper	Saturday 14 December 1929
Third round proper	Saturday 11 January 1930
Fourth round proper	Saturday 25 January 1930
Fifth round proper	Saturday 15 February 1930
Sixth round proper	Saturday 1 March 1930
Semi-finals	Saturday 22 March 1930
Final	Saturday 26 April 1930

== Qualifying rounds ==
Most participating clubs that were not members of the Football League joined the competition in the qualifying rounds. York City, who had been elected to the Football League Third Division North during the 1929 close season, also competed in the qualifying rounds of this tournament, being entered in the fourth qualifying round alongside Ashington - the club they defeated in the League ballot.

The 25 winners from the fourth qualifying round were Aldershot, Bath City, Barry, Thames, Wimbledon, Tunbridge Wells Rangers, Northfleet United, Folkestone, Margate, Dagenham Town, Nunhead, Leyton, Dulwich Hamlet, Peterborough & Fletton United, Kettering Town, Wellington Town, Newark Town, Scunthorpe & Lindsey United, Gainsborough Trinity, Manchester Central, Caernarfon Athletic, Lancaster Town and Shildon, along with Ashington and York City.

Those featuring in the main draw for the first time were Barry, Thames, Margate, Dagenham Town, Scunthorpe & Lindsey United, Manchester Central, Caernarfon Athletic and future FA Cup and FA Amateur Cup winners Wimbledon. Tunbridge Wells Rangers was appearing at this stage for the first time since 1905-06 while Newark Town's predecessor outfit Newark F.C. had last competed in the first round proper in 1885-86.

Wellington Town was the most successful club from this season's extra preliminary round, defeating Evesham Town, Worcester City, Shrewsbury Town, Oakengates Town, Cradley Heath and Boston Town before going out to Stockport County in the first round. Another notable extra preliminary contestant was Wealdstone, who lost a fourth qualifying round replay against Dulwich Hamlet at Lower Mead following a famous 7-all draw at Champion Hill in the initial match.

== First round proper ==
At this stage 41 clubs from the Football League Third Division North and South joined the 25 clubs who came through the qualifying rounds. Crystal Palace and Swindon Town were given byes to the third round. To make the number of matches up, non-league sides Mansfield Town and Ilford were given byes to this round, with Ilford being the winner of the previous season's FA Amateur Cup.

34 matches were scheduled to be played on Saturday, 30 November 1929. Seven were drawn and went to replays in the following midweek fixture, while third division clubs Clapton Orient and Doncaster Rovers needed second replays to see off qualifiers Folkestone and Shildon respectively.

Tie no	Home team	Score	Away team	Date
1	Bournemouth & Boscombe Athletic	2–0	Torquay United	30 November 1929
2	Barrow	1–0	Newark Town	30 November 1929
3	Nelson	0–3	Crewe Alexandra	30 November 1929
4	South Shields	2–4	Wrexham	30 November 1929
5	Walsall	1–0	Exeter City	30 November 1929
6	Gillingham	0–2	Margate	30 November 1929
7	Leyton	4–1	Merthyr Town	30 November 1929
8	Lincoln City	3–1	Wigan Borough	30 November 1929
9	Luton Town	2–3	Queens Park Rangers	30 November 1929
10	Gainsborough Trinity	0–0	Port Vale	30 November 1929
Replay	Port Vale	5–0	Gainsborough Trinity	4 December 1929
11	Doncaster Rovers	0–0	Shildon	30 November 1929
Replay	Shildon	1–1	Doncaster Rovers	4 December 1929
Replay	Doncaster Rovers	3–0	Shildon	9 December 1929
12	Ilford	0–3	Watford	30 November 1929
13	Wellington Town	1–4	Stockport County	30 November 1929
14	Fulham	4–0	Thames	30 November 1929
15	Accrington Stanley	3–1	Rochdale	30 November 1929
16	Brighton & Hove Albion	4–0	Peterborough & Fletton United	30 November 1929
17	Norwich City	3–3	Coventry City	30 November 1929
Replay	Coventry City	2–0	Norwich City	5 December 1929
18	Carlisle United	2–0	Halifax Town	30 November 1929
19	Tunbridge Wells Rangers	1–3	Bath City	30 November 1929
20	Clapton Orient	0–0	Folkestone	30 November 1929
Replay	Folkestone	2–2	Clapton Orient	4 December 1929
Replay	Clapton Orient	4–1	Folkestone	9 December 1929
21	Nunhead	0–2	Bristol Rovers	30 November 1929
22	Wimbledon	1–4	Northfleet United	30 November 1929
23	Southend United	1–0	Brentford	30 November 1929
24	Scunthorpe & Lindsey United	1–0	Hartlepools United	30 November 1929
25	Mansfield Town	0–2	Manchester Central	30 November 1929
26	Barry	0–0	Dagenham Town	30 November 1929
Replay	Dagenham Town	0–1	Barry	4 December 1929
27	Newport County	3–2	Kettering Town	30 November 1929
28	Southport	0–0	Chesterfield	30 November 1929
Replay	Chesterfield	3–2	Southport	4 December 1929
29	Dulwich Hamlet	0–3	Plymouth Argyle	30 November 1929
30	New Brighton	4–1	Lancaster Town	30 November 1929
31	York City	2–2	Tranmere Rovers	30 November 1929
Replay	Tranmere Rovers	0–1	York City	5 December 1929
32	Rotherham United	3–0	Ashington	30 November 1929
33	Aldershot	0–1	Northampton Town	30 November 1929
34	Caernarfon Athletic	4–2	Darlington	30 November 1929

== Second round proper ==
The matches were played on Saturday, 14 December 1929. Three matches were drawn, with replays taking place in the following midweek fixture.

Tie no	Home team	Score	Away team	Date
1	Chesterfield	2–0	Port Vale	14 December 1929
2	Watford	1–1	Plymouth Argyle	14 December 1929
Replay	Plymouth Argyle	3–0	Watford	18 December 1929
3	Leyton	1–4	Fulham	14 December 1929
4	Doncaster Rovers	1–0	New Brighton	14 December 1929
5	Stockport County	4–0	Barrow	14 December 1929
6	Queens Park Rangers	2–1	Lincoln City	14 December 1929
7	Bristol Rovers	4–1	Accrington Stanley	14 December 1929
8	Northampton Town	6–0	Margate	14 December 1929
9	Coventry City	7–1	Bath City	14 December 1929
10	Brighton & Hove Albion	4–1	Barry	14 December 1929
11	Carlisle United	4–2	Crewe Alexandra	14 December 1929
12	Clapton Orient	2–0	Northfleet United	14 December 1929
13	Southend United	1–4	York City	14 December 1929
14	Scunthorpe & Lindsey United	3–3	Rotherham United	14 December 1929
Replay	Rotherham United	5–4	Scunthorpe United	19 December 1929
15	Newport County	2–3	Walsall	14 December 1929
16	Caernarfon Athletic	1–1	Bournemouth & Boscombe Athletic	14 December 1929
Replay	Bournemouth & Boscombe Athletic	5–2	Caernarfon Athletic	18 December 1929
17	Manchester Central	0–1	Wrexham	14 December 1929

== Third round proper ==
The 44 First and Second Division clubs entered the competition at this stage, along with Crystal Palace, Swindon Town and amateur side Corinthian.

The matches were scheduled for Saturday, 11 January 1930. Eight matches were drawn and went to replays in the following midweek fixture, of which one went to a second replay. All teams in this round apart from Corinthian were Football League teams, but York City was the last participating side from the qualifying rounds.

Tie no	Home team	Score	Away team	Date
1	Birmingham	1–0	Bolton Wanderers	11 January 1930
2	Blackpool	2–1	Stockport County	11 January 1930
3	Chesterfield	1–1	Middlesbrough	11 January 1930
Replay	Middlesbrough	4–3	Chesterfield	15 January 1930
4	Bury	0–0	Huddersfield Town	11 January 1930
Replay	Huddersfield Town	3–1	Bury	15 January 1930
5	Liverpool	1–2	Cardiff City	11 January 1930
6	Walsall	2–0	Swansea Town	11 January 1930
7	Blackburn Rovers	4–1	Northampton Town	11 January 1930
8	Aston Villa	5–1	Reading	11 January 1930
9	Sheffield Wednesday	1–0	Burnley	11 January 1930
10	Derby County	5–1	Bristol City	11 January 1930
11	Doncaster Rovers	1–0	Stoke City	16 January 1930
12	Wrexham	1–0	West Bromwich Albion	11 January 1930
13	Sheffield United	2–1	Leicester City	11 January 1930
14	Newcastle United	1–1	York City	11 January 1930
Replay	York City	1–2	Newcastle United	15 January 1930
15	Tottenham Hotspur	2–2	Manchester City	11 January 1930
Replay	Manchester City	4–1	Tottenham Hotspur	15 January 1930
16	Fulham	1–1	Bournemouth & Boscombe Athletic	11 January 1930
Replay	Bournemouth & Boscombe Athletic	0–2	Fulham	15 January 1930
17	Barnsley	0–1	Bradford Park Avenue	11 January 1930
18	Coventry City	1–2	Sunderland	11 January 1930
19	Portsmouth	2–0	Preston North End	11 January 1930
20	West Ham United	4–0	Notts County	11 January 1930
21	Brighton & Hove Albion	1–1	Grimsby Town	11 January 1930
Replay	Grimsby Town	0–1	Brighton & Hove Albion	14 January 1930
22	Manchester United	0–2	Swindon Town	11 January 1930
23	Plymouth Argyle	3–4	Hull City	11 January 1930
24	Bradford City	4–1	Southampton	11 January 1930
25	Carlisle United	2–4	Everton	11 January 1930
26	Clapton Orient	1–0	Bristol Rovers	11 January 1930
27	Oldham Athletic	1–0	Wolverhampton Wanderers	11 January 1930
28	Charlton Athletic	1–1	Queens Park Rangers	11 January 1930
Replay	Queens Park Rangers	0–3	Charlton Athletic	16 January 1930
29	Arsenal	2–0	Chelsea	11 January 1930
30	Leeds United	8–1	Crystal Palace	11 January 1930
31	Corinthian	2–2	Millwall	11 January 1930
Replay	Millwall	1–1	Corinthian	15 January 1930
Replay	Millwall	5–1	Corinthian	20 January 1930
32	Rotherham United	0–5	Nottingham Forest	11 January 1930

== Fourth round proper ==
The matches were scheduled for Saturday, 25 January 1930. Five games were drawn and went to replays in the following midweek fixture, of which one went to a second replay.

Tie no	Home team	Score	Away team	Date
1	Nottingham Forest	2–1	Fulham	25 January 1930
2	Blackburn Rovers	4–1	Everton	25 January 1930
3	Aston Villa	3–1	Walsall	25 January 1930
4	Middlesbrough	1–1	Charlton Athletic	25 January 1930
Replay	Charlton Athletic	1–1	Middlesbrough	29 January 1930
Replay	Middlesbrough	1–0	Charlton Athletic	3 February 1930
5	Sunderland	2–1	Cardiff City	25 January 1930
6	Derby County	1–1	Bradford Park Avenue	25 January 1930
Replay	Bradford Park Avenue	2–1	Derby County	29 January 1930
7	Swindon Town	1–1	Manchester City	25 January 1930
Replay	Manchester City	10–1	Swindon Town	29 January 1930
8	Wrexham	0–0	Bradford City	25 January 1930
Replay	Bradford City	2–1	Wrexham	27 January 1930
9	Newcastle United	3–1	Clapton Orient	25 January 1930
10	Portsmouth	0–1	Brighton & Hove Albion	25 January 1930
11	West Ham United	4–1	Leeds United	25 January 1930
12	Millwall	4–0	Doncaster Rovers	25 January 1930
13	Hull City	3–1	Blackpool	25 January 1930
14	Oldham Athletic	3–4	Sheffield Wednesday	25 January 1930
15	Huddersfield Town	2–1	Sheffield United	25 January 1930
16	Arsenal	2–2	Birmingham	25 January 1930
Replay	Birmingham	0–1	Arsenal	29 January 1930

== Fifth round proper ==
The matches were scheduled for Saturday, 15 February 1930. There was one replay, between Sunderland and Nottingham Forest, played in the next midweek fixture.

Tie no	Home team	Score	Away team	Date
1	Aston Villa	4–1	Blackburn Rovers	15 February 1930
2	Sheffield Wednesday	5–1	Bradford Park Avenue	15 February 1930
3	Middlesbrough	0–2	Arsenal	15 February 1930
4	Sunderland	2–2	Nottingham Forest	15 February 1930
Replay	Nottingham Forest	3–1	Sunderland	19 February 1930
5	Newcastle United	3–0	Brighton & Hove Albion	15 February 1930
6	Manchester City	1–2	Hull City	15 February 1930
7	West Ham United	4–1	Millwall	15 February 1930
8	Huddersfield Town	2–1	Bradford City	15 February 1930

== Sixth round proper ==
The four Sixth Round ties were scheduled to be played on Saturday, 1 March 1930. There were two replays.

Tie no	Home team	Score	Away team	Date
1	Nottingham Forest	2–2	Sheffield Wednesday	1 March 1930
Replay	Sheffield Wednesday	3–1	Nottingham Forest	5 March 1930
2	Aston Villa	1–2	Huddersfield Town	1 March 1930
3	Newcastle United	1–1	Hull City	1 March 1930
Replay	Hull City	1–0	Newcastle United	6 March 1930
4	West Ham United	0–3	Arsenal	1 March 1930

== Semi-finals ==
The semi-final matches were played on Saturday, 22 March 1930. Arsenal and Hull City drew, replaying their game four days later. Huddersfield Town and Arsenal won their matches to meet in the final at Wembley.

22 March 1930
15:00

Huddersfield Town	2–1	Sheffield Wednesday

Old Trafford, Manchester

22 March 1930
15:00

Arsenal	2–2	Hull City
	Report

Elland Road, Leeds

Replay

26 March 1930
19:45

Arsenal	1–0	Hull City

Villa Park, Birmingham

== Final ==
The 1930 FA Cup Final was contested by Arsenal and Huddersfield Town at Wembley. Arsenal won 2–0, with goals from Alex James and Jack Lambert.

=== Match details ===
26 April 1930

Arsenal	2–0	Huddersfield Town
James 17'; Lambert 83'	(Report)

Wembley, London
Attendance: 92,488
Referee: T. Crew

Arsenal	Huddersfield Town

== See also ==
- FA Cup Final Results 1872-
