= List of Arsenal F.C. seasons =

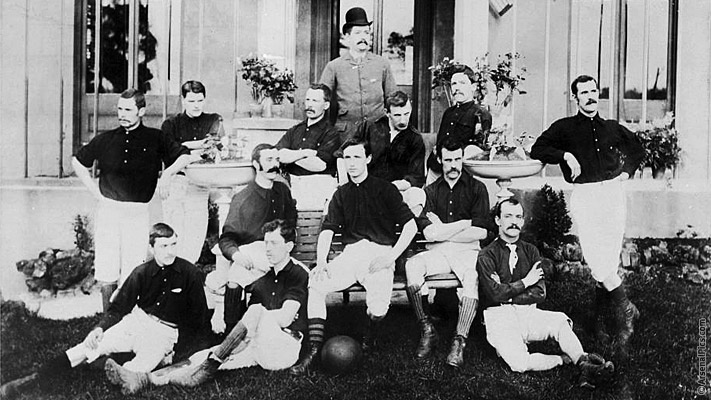
The Royal Arsenal squad of the 1888–89 season

Arsenal Football Club is an English professional association football club based in Holloway, London. The club was formed in Woolwich in 1886 as Dial Square before it was shortly renamed to Royal Arsenal, and then Woolwich Arsenal in 1893. They became the first southern member (Note: A club located in the southern counties of England. Initially these were amateur clubs, as professionalism in football was not as readily accepted in the south as in the north. In the 1893–94 season, Arsenal (under its former name Woolwich Arsenal) turned professional and became the first southern club admitted to the northern-oriented Football League. The following year saw the creation of the Southern Football League, which was composed of amateur and professional teams. By the 1920–21 season, the top division of the Southern Football League was absorbed by the Football League, to create its third division.) admitted into the Football League in 1893, having spent their first four seasons solely participating in cup tournaments and friendlies. The club's name was shortened to Arsenal in 1914, a year after moving to Highbury. In spite of finishing fifth in the Second Division in 1915, Arsenal rejoined the First Division at the expense of local rivals Tottenham Hotspur when football resumed after the First World War. Since that time, they have not fallen below the first tier of the English football league system and hold the record for the longest uninterrupted time in the top flight.

In the 1930s, Arsenal were the dominant side of England, winning five league championships and two FA Cups. Their fortunes waned, but the club soon enjoyed infrequent periods of success, including Inter-Cities Fairs Cup triumph and a first league and cup double in the 1970s. During the late 1980s, Arsenal had built a side that threatened Liverpool's league dominance, and performed greatly in cup competitions. The club played an active role in the formation of the Premier League in 1992, won the FA Cup in 1993 and the European Cup Winners Cup in 1994 and two doubles followed in 1998 and 2002. Arsenal made league history in 2003–04 when they became the first team in a 38-game season to go unbeaten. In the 2000s, Arsenal were finalists in both the UEFA Cup and UEFA Champions League, and have since equalled Real Madrid's record for most consecutive seasons in the latter competition.

As of the end of the 2025–26 season, the club's first team have spent 109 seasons in the top division of English football, and 13 in the second. Their worst league finish to date is 10th in the second tier, their placing at the end of the 1896–97 season. Arsenal's best-ever start to a Premier League season came in 2022–23, when they won nine of their first ten matches. The club's longest period without a competitive honour is 17 years, between the 1953–54 and 1969–70 seasons. Ted Drake holds the record for most competitive goals in a single season for Arsenal; he scored 44 during the 1934–35 campaign. The table details the club's achievements in major competitions, and the top scorers for each season. Records of reserve team and World War II competitions such as the London Combination and the London War Cup are not included.

== History ==
When Arsenal was founded in 1886 by munition workers' from Woolwich, the club resisted the lure of professionalism and remained an amateur side. Success in local cup competitions soon followed, and a tie against Derby County in the FA Cup on 17 January 1891 led to the opposition approaching two of Arsenal's players, in view of offering them professional contracts. Later that year the club resigned its membership of the Kent County and London Football Associations – both amateur governing bodies – and voted to turn professional, a move which attracted criticism from many southern clubs. (Note: Contrary to what was stated at the time, clubs from Southern England did not boycott Arsenal following their move to professional football, nor were the club expelled from the London or Kent FA.) In 1893, the club received an invitation to join the Football League, which the board accepted. Arsenal played in the Second Division for eleven seasons, while also participating in regional competitions, the Southern Combination and United League. The club won promotion in 1904, and enjoyed strong FA Cup campaigns in the mid-1900s, but the increase of football clubs in the capital and falling attendances at the Manor Ground pushed Arsenal close to bankruptcy by 1910. Sir Henry Norris and William Hall in that year took over Arsenal, and planned to relocate the team to Highbury in order to improve their financial standing. Arsenal were relegated back to the Second Division in 1913, but the move to North London brought about larger attendances than ever before.

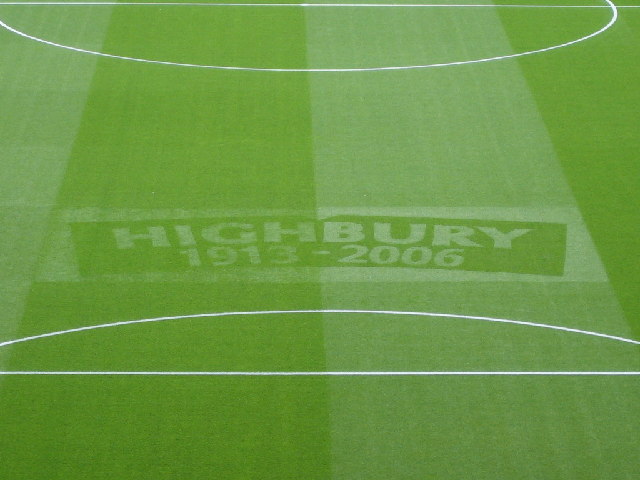
A valedictory campaign was held at Highbury during 2005–06, to mark Arsenal's final season at the ground.

In 1919, Norris arranged for the club's promotion back to the First Division, in contentious circumstances. With increased financial resources, the club established themselves as a permanent fixture in the division and was better able to spend money on new players. In 1930, Arsenal beat Huddersfield Town to win its first major piece of silverware: the FA Cup. Success continued right throughout the decade, as they won five league championships and a further FA Cup in seven years. Following the Second World War, Arsenal won two more championships and a FA Cup, but their fortunes gradually declined. It was not until 1970 that the club won another trophy – the Inter-Cities Fairs Cup, a European club competition designed to promote trade fairs. A first league and cup double was completed a year later; by the end of the decade Arsenal added another FA Cup, beating Manchester United in the 1979 final. 1980 saw Arsenal lose two finals in quick succession, defeated by West Ham United in the FA Cup final and then to Valencia in the Cup Winners' Cup on penalties. The club won their first League Cup in 1987, but a year later failed to retain the trophy as outsiders Luton Town beat them in the final. In 1989, Arsenal won their first league championship in 18 years, courtesy of Michael Thomas' last-minute goal against closest challengers Liverpool in the final game of the season. The club did not build on their success, finishing fourth the following season, but regained the title in 1991. As champions, Arsenal were eligible to play in the European Cup, (Note: Despite their status as champions in 1989, Arsenal were barred from participating in the 1989–90 European Cup as UEFA's ban on English teams from playing in European club competitions was in effect. The embargo which began in 1985 as a consequence of Liverpool's role in the Heysel tragedy, was not lifted until April 1990.) but their time in the competition ended abruptly as they were eliminated in the second round by Benfica.

The growth of commercialism in English football during the late 1980s and early 1990s paved the way for Arsenal and other prominent clubs to seek the possibility of setting up a new top-flight division. Unhappy with how income was distributed to the lower leagues and wanting to exploit television rights, Arsenal and 21 other First Division clubs handed a notice of resignation from the Football League by August 1991. The breakaway division, entitled the Premier League, was administered by The Football Association and received financial backing from Sky Television. Arsenal finished 10th in the inaugural season; the club did well in other competitions, winning a unique FA and League Cup double. They were victorious in the 1994 Cup Winners' Cup final, and came close to defending the trophy in 1995, before losing to Real Zaragoza.

Arsenal added more league and cup doubles in 1998 and 2002, and in 2004 became the first club in Premier League history to win the title without a single defeat. The side, nicknamed "The Invincibles" remained unbeaten for 49 games, before losing to Manchester United in October 2004. In 2006, Arsenal reached their first UEFA Champions League final but Barcelona scored twice in the second half to win the competition. Later that year, Arsenal moved to the Emirates Stadium which commenced a transitional period. Though the club strengthened their position in the league's "top four" and frequently participated in the Champions League, they struggled to hold on to their best players. In 2011–12, Arsenal made their worst start to a season for 58 years, but a strong finish saw the club overtake rivals Tottenham Hotspur to third position. After nine years without silverware, the club beat Hull City to win the 2014 FA Cup final and retained the trophy with a dominant display against Aston Villa in 2015, before clinching a record 13th in 2017. Arsenal won their fourteenth FA Cup in 2020, beating Chelsea.

== Key ==
Key to league competitions:

- Premier League (Prem) – England's top football league, established in 1992
- Football League First Division (Div 1) – The first tier of English football until the inception of the Premier League in 1992. It was downgraded to the second tier, but remained the highest division of the English Football League until 2004.
- Football League Second Division (Div 2) – The second tier of English football from its inception until 1992. It was downgraded to third-highest once the Premier League commenced and remained so until 2004.

- United League (United)
- Southern District Combination (S Comb)
- London League Premier Division (Lon Lge)

Key to colours and symbols:

| 1st or W | Winners |
| 2nd or RU | Runners-up |
| 3rd | Third place |
| | Current Season |
| ↑ | Promoted |
| ↓ | Relegated |
| ♦ | Top scorer in division |

Key to league record:

- Season = The year and article of the season
- Pos = Final position
- Pld = Matches played
- W = Matches won
- D = Matches drawn
- L = Matches lost
- GF = Goals scored
- GA = Goals against
- Pts = Points

Key to cup record:

- En-dash (–) = Arsenal did not participate
- DNE = The club did not enter cup play
- QR1 = First qualification round
- QR2 = Second qualification round, etc.
- Group = Group stage
- GS2 = Second group stage
- R1 = First round
- R2 = Second round, etc.
- R32 = Round of 32
- R16 = Round of 16
- QF = Quarter-finals
- SF = Semi-finals
- RU = Runners-up
- W = Winners

== Seasons ==
Results of league and cup competitions by season
| Season | Division | Pld | W | D | L | GF | GA | Pts | Pos | FA Cup (Note: The expansion of the FA Cup, from 15 clubs in its inaugural season to currently more than 700 has meant successive changes in the competition's structure. Teams in the top two divisions were made exempt from the qualifying stages and the first two rounds of the Cup in 1925–26. Because of this rounds were renamed; the fifth and sixth qualifying rounds became first and second round proper. Since 1914–15 there have been a total of 14 rounds, in comparison to five in 1871–72.) | League Cup | Community Shield | Competition | Result | Player(s) | Goals |
| Season | League | | | | | | | | | FA Cup | League Cup | Community Shield | Other / Europe (Note: Other competitions refer to the London Senior Cup, Kent Senior Cup, London Challenge Cup, London Charity Cup and the Football League Centenary Trophy. London Challenge Cup results are sourced to Kelly's first team line-ups (until the 1929–30 season) and Ollier (1995) thereafter. All other results, including the Inter-Cities Fairs Cup which was not administered by UEFA, are sourced to Kelly.) | | Top goalscorer(s) (Note: Includes goals scored in the Football League, Premier League, League Cup, FA Cup and Charity/Community Shield. The Inter-Cities Fairs Cup and European competitions organised by UEFA are also included, as are several now-defunct leagues and cup competitions: the United League, London League Premier Division, Southern District Combination, London Senior Cup, London Challenge Cup, Kent Senior Cup, London Charity Cup, Southern Floodlight Challenge Cup and commemorative Football League Centenary Trophy. Goals scored are sourced from Ollier (1995) until the 1993–94 season, and Kelly's first team line-ups before and thereafter.) | |
|---|---|---|---|---|---|---|---|---|---|---|---|---|---|---|---|---|
| 1886–87 | — | — | — | — | — | — | — | — | — | — | — | — | — | — | n/a | — |
| 1887–88 | — | — | — | — | — | — | — | — | — | — | — | — | London Senior Cup | R2 | n/a | — |
| 1888–89 | — | — | — | — | — | — | — | — | — | — | — | — | London Senior Cup Kent Senior Cup | SF R3 | Peter Connolly | 13 |
| 1889–90 | — | — | — | — | — | — | — | — | — | QR4 | — | — | London Senior Cup Kent Senior Cup London Charity Cup | RU W W | Hope Robertson Humphrey Barbour | 15 |
| 1890–91 | — | — | — | — | — | — | — | — | — | R1 | — | — | London Senior Cup London Charity Cup | W SF | Humphrey Barbour | 7 |
| 1891–92 | — | — | — | — | — | — | — | — | — | R1 | — | — | — | — | George Davie | 1 |
| 1892–93 | — | — | — | — | — | — | — | — | — | R1 | — | — | — | — | Charles Booth James Henderson | 5 |
| 1893–94 | Div 2 | 28 | 12 | 4 | 12 | 52 | 55 | 28 | 9th | R1 | — | — | — | — | James Henderson | 19 |
| 1894–95 | Div 2 | 30 | 14 | 6 | 10 | 75 | 58 | 34 | 8th | R1 | — | — | — | — | Peter Mortimer | 14 |
| 1895–96 | Div 2 | 30 | 14 | 4 | 12 | 58 | 42 | 32 | 7th | R1 | — | — | — | — | Henry Boyd | 13 |
| 1896–97 | Div 2 United (Note: The club was a founding member of the United League in 1896. The league lasted for three seasons before it disbanded.) | 30 14 | 13 6 | 4 3 | 13 5 | 68 28 | 70 34 | 30 15 | 10th 3rd | QR5 | — | — | — | — | Patrick O'Brien | 20 |
| 1897–98 | Div 2 United | 30 16 | 16 8 | 5 5 | 9 3 | 69 35 | 49 24 | 37 21 | 5th 3rd | R1 | — | — | — | — | Fergus Hunt | 16 |
| 1898–99 | Div 2 United | 34 20 | 18 10 | 5 4 | 11 6 | 72 40 | 41 30 | 31 24 | 7th 3rd | R1 | — | — | — | — | Fergus Hunt | 26 |
| 1899–1900 | Div 2 S Comb | 34 16 | 16 8 | 4 1 | 14 7 | 61 27 | 43 22 | 36 17 | 8th 4th | QR3 | — | — | — | — | Ralph Gaudie | 17 |
| 1900–01 | Div 2 | 34 | 15 | 6 | 13 | 39 | 35 | 36 | 7th | R2 | — | — | — | — | Ralph Gaudie | 8 |
| 1901–02 | Div 2 Lon Lge | 34 16 | 18 2 | 6 2 | 10 4 | 50 9 | 26 13 | 42 6 | 4th 5th | R1 | — | — | — | — | Tommy Briercliffe | 12 |
| 1902–03 | Div 2 Lon Lge | 34 10 | 20 6 | 8 0 | 6 4 | 66 14 | 30 10 | 48 12 | 3rd 3rd | R1 | — | — | — | — | Tim Coleman | 22 |
| 1903–04 | Div 2 ↑ Lon Lge | 34 12 | 21 6 | 7 2 | 6 4 | 91 24 | 22 19 | 49 14 | 2nd 3rd | R2 | — | — | — | — | Tommy Shanks | 25 |
| 1904–05 | Div 1 | 34 | 12 | 9 | 13 | 36 | 40 | 33 | 10th | R1 | — | — | — | — | Charlie Satterthwaite | 11 |
| 1905–06 | Div 1 | 38 | 15 | 7 | 16 | 62 | 64 | 37 | 12th | SF | — | — | — | — | Tim Coleman | 15 |
| 1906–07 | Div 1 | 38 | 20 | 4 | 14 | 66 | 59 | 44 | 7th | SF | — | — | — | — | Charlie Satterthwaite | 19 |
| 1907–08 | Div 1 | 38 | 12 | 12 | 14 | 51 | 63 | 36 | 15th (Note: Arsenal finished with exactly the same league record as Blackburn Rovers.) | R1 | — | — | — | — | Peter Kyle | 9 |
| 1908–09 | Div 1 | 38 | 14 | 10 | 14 | 52 | 49 | 38 | 6th | R2 | — | — | London Challenge Cup | SF | Thomas Fitchie | 10 |
| 1909–10 | Div 1 | 38 | 11 | 9 | 18 | 37 | 67 | 31 | 18th | R2 | — | — | London Challenge Cup | R2 | Charles Lewis | 8 |
| 1910–11 | Div 1 | 38 | 13 | 12 | 13 | 41 | 49 | 38 | 10th | R2 | — | — | London Challenge Cup | R2 | Jackie Chalmers | 16 |
| 1911–12 | Div 1 | 38 | 15 | 8 | 15 | 55 | 59 | 38 | 10th | R1 | — | — | London Challenge Cup | R2 | Alf Common | 19 |
| 1912–13 | Div 1 ↓ | 38 | 3 | 12 | 23 | 26 | 74 | 18 | 20th | R2 | — | — | London Challenge Cup | R1 | Charles Lewis | 4 |
| 1913–14 | Div 2 | 38 | 20 | 9 | 9 | 54 | 38 | 49 | 3rd | R1 | — | — | London Challenge Cup | SF | Pat Flanagan | 12 |
| 1914–15 | Div 2 ↑ (Note: Although they had finished outside the automatic promotion places in 1914–15, Arsenal were re-elected to the First Division after it expanded in 1919. According to Bernard Joy, Arsenal secured eighteen votes to Tottenham Hotspur's eight. However it has been alleged that Arsenal's promotion, on historical grounds rather than merit, was thanks to underhand actions by Norris, who was chairman of the club at the time; see History of Arsenal F.C. (1886–1966) for further details. These allegations range from political machinations to outright bribery; no firm proof of any wrongdoing has ever been found.) | 38 | 19 | 5 | 14 | 69 | 41 | 43 | 5th (Note: Arsenal were originally awarded sixth place due to an error calculating goal average, which was not corrected until 1975.) | R2 | — | — | London Challenge Cup | RU | Harry King | 29 |
| 1915–19 (Note: No competitive football was played between 1915 and 1919 due to the First World War. Arsenal competed in the London Combination from 1915–16 to 1918–19.) | — | — | — | — | — | — | — | — | — | — | — | — | — | — | n/a | — |
| 1919–20 | Div 1 | 42 | 15 | 12 | 15 | 56 | 58 | 42 | 10th | R2 | — | — | London Challenge Cup | R2 | Henry White | 15 |
| 1920–21 | Div 1 | 42 | 15 | 14 | 13 | 59 | 63 | 44 | 9th | R1 | — | — | London Challenge Cup | R3 | Fred Pagnam | 18 |
| 1921–22 | Div 1 | 42 | 15 | 7 | 20 | 47 | 56 | 37 | 17th | QF | — | — | London Challenge Cup | W | Henry White | 22 |
| 1922–23 | Div 1 | 42 | 16 | 10 | 16 | 61 | 62 | 42 | 11th | R1 | — | — | London Challenge Cup | R2 | Bob Turnbull | 21 |
| 1923–24 | Div 1 | 42 | 12 | 9 | 21 | 40 | 63 | 33 | 19th | R2 | — | — | London Challenge Cup | W | Harry Woods | 12 |
| 1924–25 | Div 1 | 42 | 14 | 5 | 23 | 46 | 58 | 33 | 20th | R1 | — | — | London Challenge Cup | R2 | Jimmy Brain | 15 |
| 1925–26 | Div 1 | 42 | 22 | 8 | 12 | 87 | 63 | 52 | 2nd | QF | — | — | London Challenge Cup | RU | Jimmy Brain | 37 |
| 1926–27 | Div 1 | 42 | 17 | 9 | 16 | 77 | 86 | 43 | 11th | RU | — | — | London Challenge Cup | R1 | Jimmy Brain | 34 |
| 1927–28 | Div 1 | 42 | 13 | 15 | 14 | 82 | 86 | 41 | 10th | SF | — | — | London Challenge Cup | R1 | Jimmy Brain | 29 |
| 1928–29 | Div 1 | 42 | 16 | 13 | 13 | 77 | 72 | 45 | 9th | QF | — | — | London Challenge Cup | R1 | David Jack | 26 |
| 1929–30 | Div 1 | 42 | 14 | 11 | 17 | 78 | 66 | 39 | 14th | W | — | — | London Challenge Cup | R1 | Jack Lambert | 23 |
| 1930–31 | Div 1 | 42 | 28 | 10 | 4 | 127 | 59 | 66 | 1st | R4 | — | W | London Challenge Cup | W | Jack Lambert | 39 |
| 1931–32 | Div 1 | 42 | 22 | 10 | 10 | 90 | 48 | 54 | 2nd | RU | — | W | London Challenge Cup | R2 | Jack Lambert | 26 |
| 1932–33 | Div 1 | 42 | 25 | 8 | 9 | 118 | 61 | 58 | 1st | R3 | — | — | London Challenge Cup | SF | Cliff Bastin | 33 |
| 1933–34 | Div 1 | 42 | 25 | 9 | 8 | 75 | 47 | 59 | 1st | QF | — | W | London Challenge Cup | W | Cliff Bastin | 15 |
| 1934–35 | Div 1 | 42 | 23 | 12 | 7 | 115 | 46 | 58 | 1st | QF | — | W | London Challenge Cup | R2 | Ted Drake | 44 ♦ |
| 1935–36 | Div 1 | 42 | 15 | 15 | 12 | 78 | 48 | 45 | 6th | W | — | RU | London Challenge Cup | W | Ted Drake | 27 |
| 1936–37 | Div 1 | 42 | 18 | 16 | 8 | 80 | 49 | 52 | 3rd | QF | — | RU | London Challenge Cup | RU | Ted Drake | 27 |
| 1937–38 | Div 1 | 42 | 21 | 10 | 11 | 77 | 44 | 52 | 1st | R5 | — | — | London Challenge Cup | SF | Ted Drake | 18 |
| 1938–39 | Div 1 | 42 | 19 | 9 | 14 | 55 | 41 | 47 | 5th | R3 | — | W | London Challenge Cup | SF | Ted Drake | 16 |
| 1939–45 (Note: In September 1939 first-class football was suspended due to the Second World War, with the 1939–40 league table voided and regional competitions contested instead.) | — | — | — | — | — | — | — | — | — | — | — | — | — | — | n/a | — |
| 1945–46 | — | — | — | — | — | — | — | — | — | R3 (Note: The FA Cup resumed in 1945, but league football remained regionally structured until the start of the 1946–47 season.) | — | — | — | — | Kevin O'Flanagan | 11 |
| 1946–47 | Div 1 | 42 | 16 | 9 | 17 | 72 | 70 | 41 | 13th | R3 | — | — | London Challenge Cup | R1 | Reg Lewis | 29 |
| 1947–48 | Div 1 | 42 | 23 | 13 | 6 | 81 | 32 | 59 | 1st | R3 | — | — | London Challenge Cup | R1 | Ronnie Rooke | 33 ♦ |
| 1948–49 | Div 1 | 42 | 18 | 13 | 11 | 74 | 44 | 49 | 5th | R4 | — | W | London Challenge Cup | R2 | Reg Lewis | 18 |
| 1949–50 | Div 1 | 42 | 19 | 11 | 12 | 79 | 55 | 49 | 6th | W | — | — | London Challenge Cup | R1 | Reg Lewis | 24 |
| 1950–51 | Div 1 | 42 | 19 | 9 | 14 | 73 | 56 | 47 | 5th | R5 | — | — (Note: Arsenal were not invited to take part in the 1950 FA Charity Shield despite winning the FA Cup, as the match was held between the England national football team that competed in the 1950 FIFA World Cup and the FA squad that participated in an exhibition tour of Canada during the same summer.) | London Challenge Cup | R1 | Doug Lishman | 17 |
| 1951–52 | Div 1 | 42 | 21 | 11 | 10 | 80 | 61 | 53 | 3rd | RU | — | — | London Challenge Cup | R1 | Doug Lishman | 29 |
| 1952–53 | Div 1 | 42 | 21 | 12 | 9 | 97 | 64 | 54 | 1st | QF | — | — | London Challenge Cup | R2 | Doug Lishman | 25 |
| 1953–54 | Div 1 | 42 | 15 | 13 | 14 | 75 | 73 | 43 | 12th | R4 | — | W | London Challenge Cup | W | Doug Lishman | 20 |
| 1954–55 | Div 1 | 42 | 17 | 9 | 16 | 69 | 63 | 43 | 9th | R4 | — | — | London Challenge Cup | W | Doug Lishman | 19 |
| 1955–56 | Div 1 | 42 | 18 | 10 | 14 | 60 | 61 | 46 | 5th | QF | — | — | London Challenge Cup | SF | Derek Tapscott | 21 |
| 1956–57 | Div 1 | 42 | 21 | 8 | 13 | 85 | 69 | 50 | 5th | QF | — | — | London Challenge Cup Southern Floodlight Challenge Cup | SF SF | Derek Tapscott | 32 |
| 1957–58 | Div 1 | 42 | 16 | 7 | 19 | 73 | 85 | 39 | 12th | R3 | — | — | London Challenge Cup Southern Floodlight Challenge Cup | W R1 | David Herd | 24 |
| 1958–59 | Div 1 | 42 | 21 | 8 | 13 | 88 | 68 | 50 | 3rd | R5 | — | — | London Challenge Cup Southern Floodlight Challenge Cup | SF W | David Herd | 21 |
| 1959–60 | Div 1 | 42 | 15 | 9 | 18 | 68 | 80 | 39 | 13th | R3 | — | — | London Challenge Cup Southern Floodlight Challenge Cup | R2 SF | David Herd | 14 |
| 1960–61 | Div 1 | 42 | 15 | 11 | 16 | 77 | 85 | 41 | 11th | R3 | DNE (Note: For the first six seasons of the Football League Cup, Arsenal declined to take part as its board preferred the London-centric Floodlit Cup (which became defunct once the new competition was introduced), and were against the League Cup acting as "an interim step towards league re-organisation." Arsenal eventually joined in the 1966–67 season for reasons unspecified; by the 1971–72 season it became mandatory for all Football League clubs to participate.) | — | London Challenge Cup | RU | David Herd | 30 |
| 1961–62 | Div 1 | 42 | 16 | 11 | 15 | 71 | 72 | 43 | 10th | R4 | DNE | — | London Challenge Cup | W | Alan Skirton | 23 |
| 1962–63 | Div 1 | 42 | 18 | 10 | 14 | 86 | 77 | 46 | 7th | R5 | DNE | — | London Challenge Cup | W | Joe Baker | 31 |
| 1963–64 | Div 1 | 42 | 17 | 11 | 14 | 90 | 82 | 45 | 8th | R5 | DNE | — | Inter-Cities Fairs Cup London Challenge Cup | R2 R2 | Geoff Strong | 31 |
| 1964–65 | Div 1 | 42 | 17 | 7 | 18 | 69 | 75 | 41 | 13th | R4 | DNE | — | London Challenge Cup | R1 | Joe Baker | 25 |
| 1965–66 | Div 1 | 42 | 12 | 13 | 17 | 62 | 75 | 37 | 14th | R3 | DNE | — | London Challenge Cup | RU | Joe Baker | 13 |
| 1966–67 | Div 1 | 42 | 16 | 14 | 12 | 58 | 47 | 46 | 7th | R5 | R3 | — | London Challenge Cup | R2 | George Graham | 12 |
| 1967–68 | Div 1 | 42 | 17 | 10 | 15 | 60 | 56 | 44 | 9th | R5 | RU | — | London Challenge Cup | R1 | George Graham | 21 |
| 1968–69 | Div 1 | 42 | 22 | 12 | 8 | 56 | 27 | 56 | 4th | R5 | RU | — | London Challenge Cup | R1 | John Radford | 19 |
| 1969–70 | Div 1 | 42 | 12 | 18 | 12 | 51 | 49 | 42 | 12th | R3 | R3 | — | Inter-Cities Fairs Cup London Challenge Cup | W W | John Radford | 19 |
| 1970–71 | Div 1 | 42 | 29 | 7 | 6 | 71 | 29 | 65 | 1st | W | R4 | — | Inter-Cities Fairs Cup London Challenge Cup | QF R2 | Ray Kennedy | 26 |
| 1971–72 | Div 1 | 42 | 22 | 8 | 12 | 58 | 40 | 52 | 5th | RU | R4 | — (Note: Arsenal did not participate in the 1971 FA Charity Shield due to a previously arranged pre-season tour that clashed with the event. Leicester City were invited to take part, and beat Cup runners-up Liverpool.) | European Cup London Challenge Cup | QF R2 | Ray Kennedy | 19 |
| 1972–73 | Div 1 | 42 | 23 | 11 | 8 | 57 | 43 | 57 | 2nd | SF | QF | — | London Challenge Cup | R1 | John Radford | 19 |
| 1973–74 | Div 1 | 42 | 14 | 14 | 14 | 49 | 51 | 42 | 10th | R4 | R2 | — | London Challenge Cup | SF | Ray Kennedy | 13 |
| 1974–75 | Div 1 | 42 | 13 | 11 | 18 | 47 | 49 | 37 | 16th | QF | R2 | — | — | — | Brian Kidd | 23 |
| 1975–76 | Div 1 | 42 | 13 | 10 | 19 | 47 | 53 | 36 | 17th | R3 | R2 | — | — | — | Brian Kidd | 11 |
| 1976–77 | Div 1 | 42 | 16 | 11 | 15 | 64 | 59 | 43 | 8th | R5 | QF | — | — | — | Malcolm Macdonald | 29 ♦ |
| 1977–78 | Div 1 | 42 | 21 | 10 | 11 | 60 | 37 | 52 | 5th | RU | SF | — | — | — | Malcolm Macdonald | 26 |
| 1978–79 | Div 1 | 42 | 17 | 14 | 11 | 61 | 48 | 48 | 7th | W | R2 | — | UEFA Cup | R3 | Frank Stapleton | 28 |
| 1979–80 | Div 1 | 42 | 18 | 16 | 8 | 52 | 36 | 52 | 4th | RU | QF | RU | Cup Winners' Cup | RU | Alan Sunderland | 29 |
| 1980–81 | Div 1 | 42 | 19 | 15 | 8 | 61 | 45 | 53 | 3rd | R3 | R4 | — | — | — | Frank Stapleton | 16 |
| 1981–82 | Div 1 (Note: This season saw the introduction of three points for a win instead of two.) | 42 | 20 | 11 | 11 | 48 | 37 | 71 | 5th | R3 | R4 | — | UEFA Cup | R2 | Alan Sunderland | 12 |
| 1982–83 | Div 1 | 42 | 16 | 10 | 16 | 58 | 56 | 58 | 10th | SF | SF | — | UEFA Cup | R1 | Tony Woodcock | 21 |
| 1983–84 | Div 1 | 42 | 18 | 9 | 15 | 74 | 60 | 63 | 6th | R3 | R4 | — | — | — | Tony Woodcock | 23 |
| 1984–85 | Div 1 | 42 | 19 | 9 | 14 | 61 | 49 | 66 | 7th | R4 | R3 | — | — | — | Tony Woodcock | 13 |
| 1985–86 | Div 1 | 42 | 20 | 9 | 13 | 49 | 47 | 69 | 7th | R5 | QF | — | — | — | Charlie Nicholas | 18 |
| 1986–87 | Div 1 | 42 | 20 | 10 | 12 | 58 | 35 | 70 | 4th | QF | W | — | — | — | Martin Hayes | 24 |
| 1987–88 | Div 1 | 40 | 18 | 12 | 10 | 58 | 39 | 66 | 6th | QF | RU | — | — | — | Alan Smith | 16 |
| 1988–89 | Div 1 | 38 | 22 | 10 | 6 | 73 | 36 | 76 | 1st | R3 | R3 | — | Football League Centenary Trophy | W | Alan Smith | 25 ♦ |
| 1989–90 | Div 1 | 38 | 18 | 8 | 12 | 54 | 38 | 62 | 4th | R4 | R4 | RU | — | — | Alan Smith | 13 |
| 1990–91 | Div 1 | 38 | 24 | 13 | 1 | 74 | 18 | 83 (Note: Arsenal were deducted two points for their part in a brawl with Manchester United on 20 October 1990.) | 1st | SF | R4 | — | — | — | Alan Smith | 27 ♦ |
| 1991–92 | Div 1 | 42 | 19 | 15 | 8 | 81 | 46 | 72 | 4th | R3 | R3 | W | European Cup | R2 | Ian Wright | 26 ♦ (Note: Ian Wright scored 29 goals in the First Division, five of which for Crystal Palace before his move to Arsenal in September 1991.) |
| 1992–93 | Prem | 42 | 15 | 11 | 16 | 40 | 38 | 56 | 10th | W | W | — | — | — | Ian Wright | 30 |
| 1993–94 | Prem | 42 | 18 | 17 | 7 | 53 | 28 | 71 | 4th | R4 | R4 | RU | Cup Winners' Cup | W | Ian Wright | 35 |
| 1994–95 | Prem | 42 | 13 | 12 | 17 | 52 | 49 | 51 | 12th | R3 | QF | — | Cup Winners' Cup Super Cup | RU RU | Ian Wright | 30 |
| 1995–96 | Prem | 38 | 17 | 12 | 9 | 49 | 32 | 63 | 5th | R3 | SF | — | — | — | Ian Wright | 22 |
| 1996–97 | Prem | 38 | 19 | 11 | 8 | 62 | 32 | 68 | 3rd | R4 | R4 | — | UEFA Cup | R1 | Ian Wright | 30 |
| 1997–98 | Prem | 38 | 23 | 9 | 6 | 68 | 33 | 78 | 1st | W | SF | — | UEFA Cup | R1 | Dennis Bergkamp | 22 |
| 1998–99 | Prem | 38 | 22 | 12 | 4 | 59 | 17 | 78 | 2nd | SF | R4 | W | Champions League | Group | Nicolas Anelka | 19 |
| 1999–2000 | Prem | 38 | 22 | 7 | 9 | 73 | 43 | 73 | 2nd | R4 | R4 | W | Champions League UEFA Cup (Note: Arsenal originally entered the 1999–2000 UEFA Champions League, but only came third in the group stage and were knocked out; however, they were granted a consolatory place in the UEFA Cup under the rules of the tournament at the time.) | Group RU | Thierry Henry | 26 |
| 2000–01 | Prem | 38 | 20 | 10 | 8 | 63 | 38 | 70 | 2nd | RU | R3 | — | Champions League | QF | Thierry Henry | 22 |
| 2001–02 | Prem | 38 | 26 | 9 | 3 | 79 | 36 | 87 | 1st | W | QF | — | Champions League | GS2 | Thierry Henry | 32 ♦ |
| 2002–03 | Prem | 38 | 23 | 9 | 6 | 85 | 42 | 78 | 2nd | W | R3 | W | Champions League | GS2 | Thierry Henry | 32 |
| 2003–04 | Prem | 38 | 26 | 12 | 0 | 73 | 26 | 90 | 1st | SF | SF | RU | Champions League | QF | Thierry Henry | 39 ♦ (Note: Thierry Henry was the division's top goalscorer with 30 goals, winning the European Golden Shoe in the process.) |
| 2004–05 | Prem | 38 | 25 | 8 | 5 | 87 | 36 | 83 | 2nd | W | QF | W | Champions League | R16 | Thierry Henry | 30 ♦ (Note: Joint holder of the European Golden Shoe with Diego Forlán, both of whom scored 25 goals.) |
| 2005–06 | Prem | 38 | 20 | 7 | 11 | 68 | 31 | 67 | 4th | R4 | SF | RU | Champions League | RU | Thierry Henry | 33 ♦ |
| 2006–07 | Prem | 38 | 19 | 11 | 8 | 63 | 35 | 68 | 4th | R5 | RU | — | Champions League | R16 | Robin van Persie | 13 |
| 2007–08 | Prem | 38 | 24 | 11 | 3 | 74 | 31 | 83 | 3rd | R5 | SF | — | Champions League | QF | Emmanuel Adebayor | 30 |
| 2008–09 | Prem | 38 | 20 | 12 | 6 | 68 | 37 | 72 | 4th | SF | QF | — | Champions League | SF | Robin van Persie | 20 |
| 2009–10 | Prem | 38 | 23 | 6 | 9 | 83 | 41 | 75 | 3rd | R4 | QF | — | Champions League | QF | Cesc Fàbregas | 19 |
| 2010–11 | Prem | 38 | 19 | 11 | 8 | 72 | 43 | 68 | 4th | QF | RU | — | Champions League | R16 | Robin van Persie | 22 |
| 2011–12 | Prem | 38 | 21 | 7 | 10 | 74 | 49 | 70 | 3rd | R5 | QF | — | Champions League | R16 | Robin van Persie | 37 ♦ |
| 2012–13 | Prem | 38 | 21 | 10 | 7 | 72 | 37 | 73 | 4th | R5 | QF | — | Champions League | R16 | Theo Walcott | 21 |
| 2013–14 | Prem | 38 | 24 | 7 | 7 | 68 | 41 | 79 | 4th | W | R4 | — | Champions League | R16 | Olivier Giroud | 22 |
| 2014–15 | Prem | 38 | 22 | 9 | 7 | 71 | 36 | 75 | 3rd | W | R3 | W | Champions League | R16 | Alexis Sánchez | 25 |
| 2015–16 | Prem | 38 | 20 | 11 | 7 | 65 | 36 | 71 | 2nd | QF | R4 | W | Champions League | R16 | Olivier Giroud | 24 |
| 2016–17 | Prem | 38 | 23 | 6 | 9 | 77 | 44 | 75 | 5th | W | QF | — | Champions League | R16 | Alexis Sánchez | 30 |
| 2017–18 | Prem | 38 | 19 | 6 | 13 | 74 | 51 | 63 | 6th | R3 | RU | W | Europa League | SF | Alexandre Lacazette | 17 |
| 2018–19 | Prem | 38 | 21 | 7 | 10 | 73 | 51 | 70 | 5th | R4 | QF | — | Europa League | RU | Pierre-Emerick Aubameyang | 31 ♦ |
| 2019–20 | Prem | 38 | 14 | 14 | 10 | 56 | 48 | 56 | 8th | W | R4 | — | Europa League | R32 | Pierre-Emerick Aubameyang | 29 |
| 2020–21 | Prem | 38 | 18 | 7 | 13 | 55 | 39 | 61 | 8th | R4 | QF | W | Europa League | SF | Alexandre Lacazette | 17 |
| 2021–22 | Prem | 38 | 22 | 3 | 13 | 61 | 48 | 69 | 5th | R3 | SF | — | — | — | Bukayo Saka | 12 |
| 2022–23 | Prem | 38 | 26 | 6 | 6 | 88 | 43 | 84 | 2nd | R4 | R3 | — | Europa League | R16 | Gabriel Martinelli Martin Ødegaard Bukayo Saka | 15 |
| 2023–24 | Prem | 38 | 28 | 5 | 5 | 91 | 29 | 89 | 2nd | R3 | R4 | W | Champions League | QF | Bukayo Saka | 20 |
| 2024–25 | Prem | 38 | 20 | 14 | 4 | 69 | 34 | 74 | 2nd | R3 | SF | — | Champions League | SF | Kai Havertz | 15 |
| 2025–26 | Prem | 38 | 26 | 7 | 5 | 71 | 27 | 85 | 1st | QF | RU | — | Champions League | RU | Viktor Gyökeres | 21 |
| 2026–27 | Prem | | | | | | | | | | | W | Champions League | | | |
