= Samuel Mills (footballer) =

English footballer (fl. 1890s)

Personal information
- Full name: Samuel Mills
- Date of birth: 1871
- Place of birth: Derby, England
- Position: Winger

Senior career*
Years	Team	Apps	(Gls)
- Alvaston
- Derby Midland
1891–1892	Derby County	45	(7)
- Leicester Fosse
- Loughborough
1895–1896	Woolwich Arsenal	24	(3)
- Heanor Town
- * Club domestic league appearances and goals

Samuel Mills (1871 – after 1896) was an English footballer who played in the Football League for Derby County and Woolwich Arsenal.

== Playing statistics ==
Club	Season	League			FA Cup		Total	
Club	Season	Division	Apps	Goals	Apps	Goals	Apps	Goals
Woolwich Arsenal	1895–96	Second Division	24	3	1	0	25	3
Career total			24	3	1	0	25	3
