= 1928–29 Arsenal F.C. season =

English football club season

Arsenal
1928–29 season
- Chairman: Henry Norris
- Manager: Herbert Chapman
- Stadium: Highbury
- First Division: 9th
- FA Cup: 6th Round

The 1928–29 season was Arsenal's 10th consecutive season in the top division of English football.

== Results ==
Arsenal's score comes first

=== Legend ===
Win	Draw	Loss

=== Football League First Division ===
Date	Opponent	Venue	Result	Attendance	Scorers
25 August 1928	The Wednesday	A	2–3		
29 August 1928	Derby County	H	1–3		
1 September 1928	Bolton Wanderers	H	2–0		
8 September 1928	Portsmouth	A	0–2		
15 September 1928	Birmingham	H	0–0		
22 September 1928	Manchester City	A	1–4		
26 September 1928	Derby County	A	0–0		
29 September 1928	Huddersfield Town	H	2–0		
6 October 1928	Everton	A	2–4		
13 October 1928	West Ham United	H	2–3		
20 October 1928	Newcastle United	A	3–0		
27 October 1928	Liverpool	H	4–4		
3 November 1928	Cardiff City	A	1–1		
10 November 1928	Sheffield United	H	2–0		
17 November 1928	Bury	A	0–1		
24 November 1928	Aston Villa	H	2–5		
1 December 1928	Leicester City	A	1–1		
8 December 1928	Manchester United	H	3–1		
15 December 1928	Leeds United	A	1–1		
22 December 1928	Burnley	H	3–1		
25 December 1928	Blackburn Rovers	A	2–5		
26 December 1928	Sunderland	H	1–1		
29 December 1928	The Wednesday	H	2–2		
1 January 1929	Sunderland	A	1–5		
5 January 1929	Bolton Wanderers	A	2–1		
19 January 1929	Portsmouth	H	4–0		
2 February 1929	Manchester City	H	0–0		
9 February 1929	Huddersfield Town	A	1–0		
23 February 1929	West Ham United	A	4–3		
9 March 1929	Liverpool	A	4–2		
13 March 1929	Birmingham	A	1–1		
16 March 1929	Cardiff City	H	2–1		
23 March 1929	Sheffield United	A	2–2		
29 March 1929	Blackburn Rovers	H	1–0		
30 March 1929	Bury	H	7–1		
2 April 1929	Newcastle United	H	1–2		
6 April 1929	Aston Villa	A	2–4		
13 April 1929	Leicester City	H	1–1		
20 April 1929	Manchester United	A	1–4		
22 April 1929	Everton	H	2–0		
27 April 1929	Leeds United	H	1–0		
4 May 1929	Burnley	A	3–3		

==== Final League table ====
Pos	Team	Pld	W	D	L	GF	GA	GAv	Pts
7	Blackburn Rovers	42	17	11	14	72	63	1.143	45
8	Manchester City	42	18	9	15	95	86	1.105	45
9	Arsenal	42	16	13	13	77	72	1.069	45
10	Newcastle United	42	19	6	17	70	72	0.972	44
11	Sheffield United	42	15	11	16	86	85	1.012	41

Source: World Football
Rules for classification: 1) Points; 2) Goal average; 3) Goals scored

=== FA Cup ===
Round	Date	Opponent	Venue	Result	Attendance	Goalscorers
R3	12 January 1929	Stoke City	H	2–1		
R4	26 January 1929	Mansfield Town	H	2–0		
R5	16 February 1929	Swindon Town	A	0–0		
R5 R	20 February 1929	Swindon Town	H	1–0		
R6	2 March 1929	Aston Villa	A	0–1		

== See also ==
- 1928–29 in English football
- List of Arsenal F.C. seasons
