= 1938–39 Arsenal F.C. season =

English football club season

Arsenal
1938–39 season
- Chairman: Bernard Forbes, 8th Earl of Granard
- Manager: George Allison
- Stadium: Highbury
- First Division: 5th
- FA Cup: Third round
Home colours	Away colours

The 1938–39 season was Arsenal's 20th consecutive season in the top division of English football.

== Results ==
Arsenal's score comes first

=== Legend ===
Win	Draw	Loss

=== Football League First Division ===
Date	Opponent	Venue	Result	Attendance	Scorers
27 August 1938	Portsmouth	H	2–0	54,940	
3 September 1938	Huddersfield Town	A	1–1	26,126	
8 September 1938	Brentford	A	0–1	38,535	
10 September 1938	Everton	H	1–2	64,555	
14 September 1938	Derby County	H	1–2	25,756	
17 September 1938	Wolverhampton Wanderers	A	1–0	45,364	
24 September 1938	Aston Villa	H	0–0	66,456	
1 October 1938	Sunderland	A	0–0	51,042	
8 October 1938	Grimsby Town	H	2–0	39,174	
15 October 1938	Chelsea	A	2–4	65,443	
22 October 1938	Preston North End	H	1–0	40,296	
29 October 1938	Bolton Wanderers	A	1–1	46,611	
5 November 1938	Leeds United	H	2–3	39,092	
12 November 1938	Liverpool	A	2–2	42,540	
19 November 1938	Leicester City	H	0–0	36,407	
26 November 1938	Middlesbrough	A	1–1	29,047	
3 December 1938	Birmingham	H	3–1	33,710	
10 December 1938	Manchester United	A	0–1	42,008	
17 December 1938	Stoke City	H	4–1	30,006	
24 December 1938	Portsmouth	A	0–0	21,344	
27 December 1938	Charlton Athletic	A	0–1	51,479	
31 December 1938	Huddersfeld Town	H	1–0	34,146	
14 January 1939	Everton	A	0–2	47,178	
21 January 1939	Charlton Athletic	H	2–0	39,702	
28 January 1939	Aston Villa	A	3–1	57,453	
1 February 1939	Wolverhampton Wanderers	H	0–0	33,103	
4 February 1939	Sunderland	H	2–0	45,875	
18 February 1939	Chelsea	H	1–0	54,510	
21 February 1939	Grimsby Town	A	1–2	10,845	
25 February 1939	Preston North End	A	1–2	29,678	
4 March 1939	Bolton Wanderers	H	3–1	29,814	
11 March 1939	Leeds United	A	2–4	22,160	
18 March 1939	Liverpool	H	2–0	31,495	
25 March 1939	Leicester City	A	2–0	22,565	
1 April 1939	Middlesbrough	H	1–2	34,669	
7 April 1939	Blackpool	A	0–1	31,497	
8 April 1939	Birmingham	A	2–1	33,250	
10 April 1939	Blackpool	H	2–1	30,760	
15 April 1939	Manchester United	H	2–1	25,741	
22 April 1939	Stoke City	A	0–1	26,039	
29 April 1939	Derby County	A	2–1	10,186	
6 May 1939	Brentford	H	2–0	30,928	

==== Final League table ====
Pos	Team	Pld	W	D	L	GF	GA	GAv	Pts
3	Charlton Athletic	42	22	6	14	75	59	1.271	50
4	Middlesbrough	42	20	9	13	93	74	1.257	49
5	Arsenal	42	19	9	14	55	41	1.341	47
6	Derby County	42	19	8	15	66	55	1.200	46
7	Stoke City	42	17	12	13	71	68	1.044	46

Source: World Football
Rules for classification: 1) Points; 2) Goal average; 3) Goals scored

=== FA Cup ===
Arsenal entered the FA Cup in the third round, in which they were drawn to face Chelsea.

Round	Date	Opponent	Venue	Result	Attendance	Goalscorers
R3	7 January 1939	Chelsea	A	1–2	58,095	

== See also ==
- 1938–39 in English football
- List of Arsenal F.C. seasons
