= 1933–34 Arsenal F.C. season =

English football club season

Arsenal
1933–34 season
- Chairman: Samuel Hill-Wood
- Manager: Herbert Chapman (to January); Joe Shaw (from January)
- Stadium: Highbury
- First Division: 1st
- FA Cup: Sixth Round
- Top goalscorer: League: Cliff Bastin (13); All: Cliff Bastin (15)

The 1933–34 season was Arsenal's 15th consecutive season in the top division of English football. The Gunners won the league again, for the third time in four years, again winning it at Chelsea, this time with a 2–2 draw. They finished three points clear of runners-up Huddersfield Town, but manager Herbert Chapman, who had invented the WM formation along with a host of other tactics, and had first suggested the use of floodlights and numbered shirts, as well as initiating with European competition, died of pneumonia on 6 January 1934. On the day of his death, the crowd at Highbury for that day's match stood to commemorate him.

Arsenal won the Charity Shield with a 3–0 triumph at Everton, but went out of the FA Cup against Aston Villa. Arsenal's biggest league win of the season was 6–0 against Middlesbrough; in all competitions it was 7–0 against Crystal Palace in the FA Cup fourth round. Their top scorer was once again Cliff Bastin, who scored 13 league goals and 15 in all competitions.

== Results ==
Arsenal's score comes first

=== Legend ===
Win	Draw	Loss

=== Football League First Division ===
Date	Opponent	Venue	Result	Attendance	Scorers
26 August 1933	Birmingham	H	1–1	44,662	
2 September 1933	Sheffield Wednesday	A	2–1	23,186	
6 September 1933	West Bromwich Albion	H	3–1	34,888	
9 September 1933	Manchester City	H	1–1	43,412	
13 September 1933	West Bromwich Albion	A	0–1	39,398	
16 September 1933	Tottenham Hotspur	A	1–1	56,612	
23 September 1933	Everton	A	1–3	53,792	
30 September 1933	Middlesbrough	H	6–0	28,293	
7 October 1933	Blackburn Rovers	A	2–2	31,636	
14 October 1933	Newcastle United	H	3–0	32,821	
21 October 1933	Leicester City	H	2–0	44,014	
28 October 1933	Aston Villa	A	3–2	54,323	
4 November 1933	Portsmouth	H	1–1	51,765	
11 November 1933	Wolverhampton Wanderers	A	1–0	37,210	
18 November 1933	Stoke City	H	3–0	32,972	
25 November 1933	Huddersfield Town	A	1–0	29,407	
2 December 1933	Liverpool	H	2–1	38,362	
9 December 1933	Sunderland	A	0–3	35,166	
16 December 1933	Chelsea	H	2–1	43,897	
23 December 1933	Sheffield United	A	3–1	31,453	
25 December 1933	Leeds United	A	1–0	33,193	
26 December 1933	Leeds United	H	2–0	22,817	
30 December 1933	Birmingham	A	0–0	34,771	
6 January 1934	Sheffield Wednesday	H	1–1	45,156	
20 January 1934	Manchester City	A	1–2	60,401	
31 January 1934	Tottenham Hotspur	H	1–3	68,674	
3 February 1934	Everton	H	1–2	24,025	
10 February 1934	Middlesbrough	A	2–0	15,894	
21 February 1934	Blackburn Rovers	H	2–1	29,886	
24 February 1934	Newcastle United	A	1–0	40,065	
8 March 1934	Leicester City	A	1–4	23,976	
10 March 1934	Aston Villa	H	3–2	41,169	
24 March 1934	Wolverhampton Wanderers	H	3–2	41,143	
30 March 1934	Derby County	H	1–0	69,007	
31 March 1934	Stoke City	A	1–1	43,163	
2 April 1934	Derby County	A	4–2	32,180	
7 April 1934	Huddersfield Town	H	3–1	55,930	
14 April 1934	Liverpool	A	3–2	43,027	
18 April 1934	Portsmouth	A	0–1	28,442	
21 April 1934	Sunderland	H	2–1	37,783	
28 April 1934	Chelsea	A	2–2	65,344	
5 May 1934	Sheffield United	H	2–0	25,265	

==== Final League table ====
Pos	Team	Pld	W	D	L	GF	GA	GAv	Pts
1	Arsenal (C)	42	25	9	8	75	47	1.596	59
2	Huddersfield Town	42	23	10	9	90	61	1.475	56
3	Tottenham Hotspur	42	21	7	14	79	56	1.411	49
4	Derby County	42	17	11	14	68	54	1.259	45
5	Manchester City	42	17	11	14	65	72	0.903	45

Source: World Football
Rules for classification: 1) Points; 2) Goal average; 3) Goals scored
(C) Champions

=== FA Cup ===
Round	Date	Opponent	Venue	Result	Attendance	Goalscorers
R3	13 January 1934	Luton Town	A	1–0	18,641	
R4	27 January 1934	Crystal Palace	H	7–0	56,177	
R5	17 February 1934	Derby County	H	1–0	66,905	
R6	3 March 1934	Aston Villa	H	1–2	67,566	

== See also ==
- 1933–34 in English football
- List of Arsenal F.C. seasons
