= 1926–27 Arsenal F.C. season =

English football club season

Arsenal
1926–27 season
- Chairman: Henry Norris
- Manager: Herbert Chapman
- Stadium: Highbury
- First Division: 11th
- FA Cup: Finalists
Home colours	Away colours

The 1926–27 season was Arsenal's 8th consecutive season in the top division of English football.

== Results ==
Arsenal's score comes first

=== Legend ===
Win	Draw	Loss

=== Football League First Division ===
Date	Opponent	Venue	Result	Attendance	Scorers
28 August 1926	Derby County	H	2–1		
1 September 1926	Bolton Wanderers	H	2–1		
4 September 1926	Sheffield United	A	0–4		
6 September 1926	Bolton Wanderers	A	2–2		
11 September 1926	Leicester City	H	2–2		
15 September 1926	Manchester United	A	2–2		
18 September 1926	Liverpool	H	2–0		
25 September 1926	Leeds United	A	1–4		
2 October 1926	Newcastle United	H	2–2		
9 October 1926	Burnley	A	0–2		
16 October 1926	West Ham United	H	2–2		
23 October 1926	The Wednesday	H	6–2		
30 October 1926	Everton	A	1–3		
6 November 1926	Blackburn Rovers	H	2–2		
13 November 1926	Huddersfield Town	A	3–3		
20 November 1926	Sunderland	H	2–3		
27 November 1926	West Bromwich Albion	A	3–1		
4 December 1926	Bury	H	1–0		
11 December 1926	Birmingham	A	0–0		
18 December 1926	Tottenham Hotspur	H	2–4		
27 December 1926	Cardiff City	A	0–2		
28 December 1926	Manchester United	H	1–0		
1 January 1927	Cardiff City	H	3–2		
15 January 1927	Derby County	A	2–0		
22 January 1927	Sheffield United	H	1–1		
5 February 1927	Liverpool	A	0–3		
10 February 1927	Leicester City	A	1–2		
12 February 1927	Leeds United	H	1–0		
26 February 1927	Burnley	H	6–2		
7 March 1927	West Ham United	A	0–7		
12 March 1927	The Wednesday	A	2–4		
19 March 1927	Everton	H	1–2		
2 April 1927	Huddersfield Town	H	0–2		
6 April 1927	Newcastle United	A	1–6		
9 April 1927	Sunderland	A	1–5		
15 April 1927	Aston Villa	H	2–1		
16 April 1927	West Bromwich Albion	H	4–1		
18 April 1927	Aston Villa	A	3–2		
28 April 1927	Blackburn Rovers	A	2–1		
30 April 1927	Birmingham	H	3–0		
4 May 1927	Bury	A	2–3		
7 May 1927	Tottenham Hotspur	A	4–0		

==== Final League table ====
Pos	Team	Pld	W	D	L	GF	GA	GAv	Pts
9	Liverpool	42	18	7	17	69	61	1.131	43
10	Aston Villa	42	18	7	17	81	83	0.976	43
11	Arsenal	42	17	9	16	77	86	0.895	43
12	Derby County	42	17	7	18	86	73	1.178	41
13	Tottenham Hotspur	42	16	9	17	76	78	0.974	41

Source: World Football
Rules for classification: 1) Points; 2) Goal average; 3) Goals scored

=== FA Cup ===
Round	Date	Opponent	Venue	Result	Attendance	Goalscorers
R3	8 January 1927	Sheffield United	A	3–2		
R4	29 January 1927	Port Vale	A	2–2		
R4 R	2 February 1927	Port Vale	H	1–0		
R5	19 February 1927	Liverpool	H	2–0		
R6	5 March 1927	Wolverhampton Wanderers	H	2–1		
SF	26 March 1927	Southampton	N	2–1		
F	23 April 1927	Cardiff City	N	0–1	91,206	

== See also ==
- 1926–27 in English football
- List of Arsenal F.C. seasons
