= 1934–35 Arsenal F.C. season =

English football club season

Arsenal
1934–35 season
- Chairman: Samuel Hill-Wood
- Manager: George Allison
- Stadium: Highbury
- First Division: 1st
- FA Cup: Sixth Round

The 1934–35 season was Arsenal's 16th consecutive season in the top division of English football. After the death of Herbert Chapman in January 1934, Joe Shaw had been designated as caretaker, but in the summer George Allison became full-time manager. In his debut season, he guided Arsenal to their third consecutive league title, with Arsenal finishing four points ahead of Sunderland and winning it at Middlesbrough. The Charity Shield was won at Highbury with a 4–0 victory over Manchester City, but the FA Cup run was ended by Sheffield Wednesday in the quarter-finals. During the season Arsenal had their highest ever Highbury attendance, with 73,295 witnessing a goalless draw against title rivals Sunderland. Ted Drake was top scorer with a club-record 42 goals from 41 league matches, thus topping the league scoring charts. In all competitions he made five more starts and scored two more goals. This season, Arsenal won 8-0 twice, against Leicester City and Middlesbrough, 7–0 against Wolves, 8–1 against Liverpool and 6–0 at rivals Tottenham.

== Results ==
Arsenal's score comes first

=== Legend ===
Win	Draw	Loss

=== Football League First Division ===
Date	Opponent	Venue	Result	Attendance	Scorers
25 August 1934	Portsmouth	A	3–3	39,710	
1 September 1934	Liverpool	H	8–1	54,062	
5 September 1934	Blackburn Rovers	H	4–0	39,654	
8 September 1934	Leeds United	A	1–1	29,447	
15 September 1934	West Bromwich Albion	H	4–3	40,016	
17 September 1934	Blackburn Rovers	A	0–2	25,472	
22 September 1934	Sheffield Wednesday	A	0–0	24,751	
29 September 1934	Birmingham	H	5–1	47,868	
6 October 1934	Stoke City	A	2–2	45,340	
13 October 1934	Manchester City	H	3–0	68,145	
20 October 1934	Tottenham Hotspur	H	5–1	70,544	
27 October 1934	Sunderland	A	1–2	43,744	
3 November 1934	Everton	H	2–0	50,350	
10 November 1934	Grimsby Town	A	2–2	26,288	
17 November 1934	Aston Villa	H	1–2	54,226	
24 November 1934	Chelsea	A	5–2	43,419	
1 December 1934	Wolverhampton Wanderers	H	7–0	39,532	
8 December 1934	Huddersfield Town	A	1–1	36,113	
15 December 1934	Leicester City	H	8–0	23,689	
22 December 1934	Derby County	A	1–3	26,091	
25 December 1934	Preston North End	H	5–3	40,201	
26 December 1934	Preston North End	A	1–2	39,411	
29 December 1934	Portsmouth	H	1–1	36,054	
5 January 1935	Liverpool	A	2–0	55,794	
19 January 1935	Leeds United	H	3–0	37,026	
30 January 1935	West Bromwich Albion	A	3–0	42,997	
2 February 1935	Sheffield Wednesday	H	4–1	57,922	
9 February 1935	Birmingham	A	0–3	50,188	
20 February 1935	Stoke City	H	2–0	30,529	
23 February 1935	Manchester City	A	1–1	79,491	
6 March 1935	Tottenham Hotspur	A	6–0	47,714	
9 March 1935	Sunderland	H	0–0	73,295	
16 March 1935	Everton	A	2–0	50,389	
23 March 1935	Grimsby Town	H	1–1	33,591	
30 March 1935	Aston Villa	A	3–1	59,572	
6 April 1935	Chelsea	H	2–2	54,020	
13 April 1935	Wolverhampton Wanderers	A	1–1	40,888	
19 April 1935	Middlesbrough	H	8–0	45,719	
20 April 1935	Huddersfield Town	H	1–0	41,892	
22 April 1935	Middlesbrough	A	1–0	29,171	
27 April 1935	Leicester City	A	5–3	26,958	
4 May 1935	Derby County	H	0–1	36,421	

==== Final League table ====
Pos	Team	Pld	W	D	L	GF	GA	GAv	Pts
1	Arsenal (C)	42	23	12	7	115	46	2.500	58
2	Sunderland	42	19	16	7	90	51	1.765	54
3	Sheffield Wednesday	42	18	13	11	70	64	1.094	49
4	Manchester City	42	20	8	14	82	67	1.224	48
5	Grimsby Town	42	17	11	14	78	60	1.300	45

Source: World Football
Rules for classification: 1) Points; 2) Goal average; 3) Goals scored
(C) Champions

=== FA Cup ===
Round	Date	Opponent	Venue	Result	Attendance	Goalscorers
R3	12 January 1935	Brighton & Hove Albion	A	2–0	22,343	
R4	26 January 1935	Leicester City	A	1–0	39,494	
R5	16 February 1935	Reading	A	1–0	30,621	
R6	2 March 1935	Sheffield Wednesday	A	1–2	66,945	

== See also ==
- 1934–35 in English football
- List of Arsenal F.C. seasons
