= 1930–31 Arsenal F.C. season =

English football club season

Arsenal
1930–31 season
- Chairman: Samuel Hill-Wood
- Manager: Herbert Chapman
- Stadium: Highbury
- First Division: 1st
- FA Cup: 4th Round

The 1930–31 Arsenal F.C. season was 12th consecutive season in the top division of English football. After winning the FA Cup the previous term, they claimed their first Division 1 title this season, finishing seven points clear of Aston Villa. Arsenal failed to retain the FA Cup, losing to Chelsea in the fourth round, but won the Charity Shield against Sheffield Wednesday in October 1930.

Arsenal's top scorer in the league was Jack Lambert, who scored 38 league goals and 39 times overall. The club earned 66 points from 42 league matches, with 28 wins, 10 draws and 4 losses.

Arsenal started the season well, winning the opening two matches 4–1 away from home, and won the first five league matches, and remained unbeaten for the first nine, before beating league champions Sheffield Wednesday 2–1 in the Charity Shield. They then suffered their first defeat of the season, 4–2, at Derby County, before making up for it with a 5–2 win over challengers Aston Villa nearly a month later. In December Arsenal beat Blackpool 7–1 to finish 1930 on a high. The following month they beat Aston Villa after a replay in the FA Cup third round, though the cup run ended in the next round at Chelsea. Arsenal then claimed their biggest-ever league win at Highbury in a 9-1 annihilation of Grimsby Town, with David Jack hitting four and Jack Lambert grabbing a hat-trick. A 7–2 win at Leicester City and a 6–3 victory over Derby County helped Arsenal in their title charge, but were stopped in their tracks on 14 March in a 5–1 loss at Aston Villa. Nonetheless, a 3–1 win over Liverpool on 18 April ensured Arsenal won the league for the first of fourteen times in their history.

== Results ==
Arsenal's score comes first

=== Legend ===
Win	Draw	Loss

=== Football League First Division ===
Date	Opponent	Venue	Result	Attendance	Scorers
30 August 1930	Blackpool	A	4–1	28,723	
1 September 1930	Bolton Wanderers	A	4–1	20,684	
6 September 1930	Leeds United	H	3–1	40,828	
10 September 1930	Blackburn Rovers	H	3–2	20,863	
13 September 1930	Sunderland	A	4–1	26,525	
15 September 1930	Blackburn Rovers	A	2–2	25,572	
20 September 1930	Leicester City	H	4–1	37,851	
27 September 1930	Birmingham	A	4–2	31,693	
4 October 1930	Sheffield United	H	1–1	47,113	
11 October 1930	Derby County	A	2–4	29,783	
18 October 1930	Manchester United	A	2–1	23,406	
25 October 1930	West Ham United	H	1–1	51,918	
1 November 1930	Huddersfield Town	A	1–1	25,772	
8 November 1930	Aston Villa	H	5–2	56,417	
15 November 1930	Sheffield Wednesday	A	2–1	43,671	
22 November 1930	Middlesbrough	H	5–3	32,517	
29 November 1930	Chelsea	A	5–1	74,667	
13 December 1930	Liverpool	A	1–1	44,342	
20 December 1930	Newcastle United	H	1–2	32,212	
25 December 1930	Manchester City	A	4–1	56,750	
26 December 1930	Manchester City	H	3–1	17,624	
27 December 1930	Blackpool	H	7–1	35,113	
17 January 1931	Sunderland	H	1–3	35,975	
28 January 1931	Grimsby Town	H	9–1	15,751	
31 January 1931	Birmingham	H	1–1	30,913	
5 February 1931	Leicester City	A	7–2	17,416	
7 February 1931	Sheffield United	A	1–1	49,602	
14 February 1931	Derby County	H	6–3	34,785	
21 February 1931	Manchester United	H	4–1	41,510	
28 February 1931	West Ham United	A	4–2	30,361	
7 March 1931	Huddersield Town	H	0–0	31,058	
11 March 1931	Leeds United	A	2–1	12,212	
14 March 1931	Aston Villa	A	1–5	60,997	
21 March 1931	Sheffield Wednesday	H	2–0	47,872	
28 March 1931	Middlesbrough	A	5–2	23,476	
3 April 1931	Portsmouth	A	1–1	31,398	
4 April 1931	Chelsea	H	2–1	53,867	
6 April 1931	Portsmouth	H	1–1	40,490	
11 April 1931	Grimsby Town	A	1–0	22,394	
18 April 1931	Liverpool	H	3–1	39,143	
25 April 1931	Newcastle United	A	3–1	21,747	
2 May 1931	Bolton Wanderers	H	5–0	35,406	

==== Final League table ====
Pos	Team	Pld	W	D	L	GF	GA	GAv	Pts
1	Arsenal (C)	42	28	10	4	127	59	2.153	66
2	Aston Villa	42	25	9	8	128	78	1.641	59
3	Sheffield Wednesday	42	22	8	12	102	75	1.360	52
4	Portsmouth	42	18	13	11	84	67	1.254	49
5	Huddersfield Town	42	18	12	12	81	65	1.246	48

Source: World Football
Rules for classification: 1) Points; 2) Goal average; 3) Goals scored
(C) Champions

=== FA Cup ===
Round	Date	Opponent	Venue	Result	Attendance	Goalscorers
R3	10 January 1931	Aston Villa	H	2–2	40,864	
R3 R	14 January 1931	Aston Villa	A	3–1	73,668	
R4	24 January 1931	Chelsea	A	1–2	62,945	

== See also ==
- 1930–31 in English football
- List of Arsenal F.C. seasons
