= 1951–52 Arsenal F.C. season =

English football club season

Arsenal
1951–52 season
- Chairman: Bracewell Smith
- Manager: Tom Whittaker
- Stadium: Highbury
- First Division: 3rd
- FA Cup: Runners-up
- Top goalscorer: League: Doug Lishman (23); All: Doug Lishman (29)
- Highest home attendance: 72,164 vs. Tottenham Hotspur (29 September 1951)
- Lowest home attendance: 35,985 vs. Charlton Athletic (13 March 1952)
Home colours	Away colours

The 1951–52 season was Arsenal Football Club's 26th consecutive season in the top flight of English football.

== Results ==
Arsenal's score comes first

=== Legend ===
Win	Draw	Loss

=== Football League First Division ===
Date	Opponent	Venue	Result	Attendance	Scorers
18 August 1951	Huddersfield Town	H	2–2	51,072	
22 August 1951	Chelsea	A	3–1	59,143	
25 August 1951	Wolverhampton Wanderers	A	1–2	40,931	
29 August 1951	Chelsea	H	2–1	45,768	
1 September 1951	Sunderland	H	3–0	66,137	
5 September 1951	Liverpool	H	0–0	47,483	
8 September 1951	Aston Villa	A	0–1	56,860	
12 September 1951	Liverpool	A	0–0	39,853	
15 September 1951	Derby County	H	3–1	47,151	
22 September 1951	Manchester City	A	2–0	48,418	
29 September 1951	Tottenham Hotspur	H	1–1	72,164	
6 October 1951	Preston North End	A	0–2	38,321	
13 October 1951	Burnley	H	1–0	45,531	
20 October 1951	Charlton Athletic	A	3–1	57,031	
27 October 1951	Fulham	H	4–3	51,178	
3 November 1951	Middlesbrough	A	3–0	35,408	
10 November 1951	West Bromwich Albion	H	6–3	52,431	
17 November 1951	Newcastle United	A	0–2	61,192	
24 November 1951	Bolton Wanderers	H	4–2	50,790	
1 December 1951	Stoke City	A	1–2	29,363	
8 December 1951	Manchester United	H	1–3	53,451	
15 December 1951	Huddersfield Town	A	3–2	22,427	
22 December 1951	Wolverhampton Wanderers	H	2–2	43,644	
25 December 1951	Portsmouth	H	4–1	51,241	
26 December 1951	Portsmouth	A	1–1	41,325	
29 December 1951	Sunderland	A	1–4	47,045	
5 January 1952	Aston Villa	H	2–1	51,540	
19 January 1952	Derby County	A	2–1	28,791	
26 January 1952	Manchester City	H	2–2	52,527	
9 February 1952	Tottenham Hotspur	A	2–1	66,438	
16 February 1952	Preston North End	H	3–3	59,949	
1 March 1952	Burnley	A	1–0	41,040	
13 March 1952	Charlton Athletic	H	2–1	35,985	
15 March 1952	Fulham	A	0–0	44,088	
22 March 1952	Middlesbrough	H	3–1	50,979	
11 April 1952	Blackpool	A	0–0	32,186	
12 April 1952	Bolton Wanderers	A	1–2	47,940	
14 April 1952	Blackpool	H	4–1	48,445	
16 April 1952	Newcastle United	H	1–1	51,205	
19 April 1952	Stoke City	H	4–1	44,962	
21 April 1952	West Bromwich Albion	A	1–3	39,618	
26 April 1952	Manchester United	A	1–6	55,516	

==== Final League table ====
Pos	Team	Pld	W	D	L	GF	GA	GAv	Pts
1	Manchester United (C)	42	23	11	8	95	52	1.827	57
2	Tottenham Hotspur	42	22	9	11	76	51	1.490	53
3	Arsenal	42	21	11	10	80	61	1.311	53
4	Portsmouth	42	20	8	14	68	58	1.172	48
5	Bolton Wanderers	42	19	10	13	65	61	1.066	48

Source: World Football
Rules for classification: 1) Points; 2) Goal average; 3) Goals scored
(C) Champions

=== FA Cup ===
Arsenal entered the FA Cup in the third round, in which they were drawn to face Norwich City.

Round	Date	Opponent	Venue	Result	Attendance	Goalscorers
R3	12 January 1952	Norwich City	A	5–0	38,964	Logie, Roper, Lishman (2), Goring
R4	2 February 1952	Barnsley	H	4–0	69,466	
R5	23 February 1952	Leyton Orient	A	2–0	30,000	
R6	8 March 1952	Luton Town	A	3–2	28,433	
SF	5 April 1952	Chelsea	N	1–1	68,084	
SF R	7 April 1952	Chelsea	N	3–0	57,450	
F	3 May 1952	Newcastle United	N	0–1	100,000	

== See also ==
- 1951–52 in English football
- List of Arsenal F.C. seasons
