= 1927–28 Arsenal F.C. season =

English football club season

Arsenal
1927–28 season
- Chairman: Henry Norris
- Manager: Herbert Chapman
- Stadium: Highbury
- First Division: 10th
- FA Cup: Semi-Finalists

The 1927–28 season was Arsenal's 9th consecutive season in the top division of English football.

== Results ==
Arsenal's score comes first

=== Legend ===
Win	Draw	Loss

=== Football League First Division ===
Date	Opponent	Venue	Result	Attendance	Scorers
27 August 1927	Bury	A	1–5		
31 August 1927	Burnley	H	4–1		
3 September 1927	Sheffield United	H	6–1		
5 September 1927	Burnley	A	2–1		
10 September 1927	Aston Villa	A	2–2		
17 September 1927	Sunderland	H	2–1		
24 September 1927	Derby County	A	0–4		
1 October 1927	West Ham United	H	2–2		
8 October 1927	Portsmouth	A	3–2		
15 October 1927	Leicester City	H	2–2		
22 October 1927	The Wednesday	A	1–1		
29 October 1928	Bolton Wanderers	H	1–2		
5 November 1927	Blackburn Rovers	A	1–4		
12 November 1927	Middlesbrough	H	3–1		
19 November 1927	Birmingham	A	1–1		
3 December 1927	Huddersfield Town	A	1–2		
10 December 1927	Newcastle United	H	4–1		
17 December 1927	Manchester United	A	1–4		
24 December 1927	Everton	H	3–2		
27 December 1927	Liverpool	A	2–0		
31 December 1927	Bury	H	3–1		
2 January 1928	Tottenham Hotspur	H	1–1		
7 January 1928	Sheffield United	A	4–6		
21 January 1928	Aston Villa	H	0–3		
4 February 1928	Derby County	H	3–4		
11 February 1928	West Ham United	A	2–2		
25 February 1928	Leicester City	A	2–3		
7 March 1928	Liverpool	H	6–3		
10 March 1928	Bolton Wanderers	A	1–1		
14 March 1928	Sunderland	A	1–5		
17 March 1928	Blackburn Rovers	H	3–2		
28 March 1928	Portsmouth	H	0–2		
31 March 1928	Birmingham	H	2–2		
6 April 1928	Cardiff City	H	3–0		
7 April 1928	Tottenham Hotspur	A	0–2		
9 April 1928	Cardiff City	A	2–2		
14 April 1928	Huddersfield Town	H	0–0		
18 April 1928	Middlesbrough	A	2–2		
21 April 1928	Newcastle United	A	1–1		
28 April 1928	Manchester United	H	0–1		
2 May 1929	The Wednesday	H	1–1		
5 May 1929	Everton	A	3–3		

==== Final League table ====
Pos	Team	Pld	W	D	L	GF	GA	GAv	Pts
8	Aston Villa	42	17	9	16	78	73	1.068	43
9	Newcastle United	42	15	13	14	79	81	0.975	43
10	Arsenal	42	13	15	14	82	86	0.953	41
11	Birmingham	42	13	15	14	70	75	0.933	41
12	Blackburn Rovers	42	16	9	17	66	78	0.846	41

Source: World Football
Rules for classification: 1) Points; 2) Goal average; 3) Goals scored

=== FA Cup ===
Round	Date	Opponent	Venue	Result	Attendance	Goalscorers
R3	14 January 1928	West Bromwich Albion	H	2–0		
R4	28 January 1928	Everton	H	4–3		
R5	18 February 1928	Aston Villa	H	4–1		
R6	3 March 1928	Stoke City	H	4–1		
SF	24 March 1928	Blackburn Rovers	A	0–1		

== See also ==
- 1927–28 in English football
- List of Arsenal F.C. seasons
