= 1948–49 Arsenal F.C. season =

English football club season

Arsenal
1948–49 season
- Chairman: Bracewell Smith
- Manager: Tom Whittaker
- Stadium: Highbury
- First Division: 5th
- FA Cup: Fourth round
Home colours	Away colours

The 1948–49 season was Arsenal Football Club's 23rd consecutive season in the top flight of English football.

== Results ==
Arsenal's score comes first

=== Legend ===
Win	Draw	Loss

=== FA Charity Shield ===
Arsenal entered the FA Charity Shield as 1947-48 League champions, in which they faced FA Cup winners Manchester United.

Date	Opponent	Venue	Result	Attendance	Goalscorers
6 October 1948	Manchester United	H	4–3	31,000	

=== Football League First Division ===
Date	Opponent	Venue	Result	Attendance	Scorers
21 August 1948	Huddersfield Town	A	1–1	30,620	
25 August 1948	Stoke City	H	3–0	43,867	
28 August 1948	Manchester United	H	0–1	64,150	
30 August 1948	Stoke City	A	0–1	39,645	
4 September 1948	Sheffield United	A	1–1	37,987	
8 September 1948	Liverpool	H	1–1	41,571	
11 September 1948	Aston Villa	H	3–1	54,144	
15 September 1948	Liverpool	A	1–0	46,714	
18 September 1948	Sunderland	A	1–1	64,436	
25 September 1948	Wolverhampton Wanderers	H	3–1	56,869	
2 October 1948	Bolton Wanderers	A	0–1	45,228	
9 October 1948	Burnley	H	3–1	53,657	
16 October 1948	Preston North End	A	1–1	31,476	
23 October 1948	Everton	H	5–0	49,048	
30 October 1948	Chelsea	A	1–0	56,476	
6 November 1948	Birmingham City	H	2–0	61,571	
13 November 1948	Middlesbrough	A	1–0	35,852	
20 November 1948	Newcastle United	H	0–1	68,283	
27 November 1948	Portsmouth	A	1–4	43,000	
4 December 1948	Manchester City	H	1–1	48,960	
11 December 1948	Charlton Athletic	A	3–4	51,517	
18 December 1948	Huddersfield Town	H	3–0	36,825	
25 December 1948	Derby County	H	3–3	40,665	
27 December 1948	Derby County	A	1–2	33,378	
1 January 1949	Manchester United	A	0–2	61,547	
15 January 1949	Sheffield United	H	5–3	46,727	
22 January 1949	Aston Villa	A	0–1	69,284	
5 February 1949	Sunderland	H	5–0	53,742	
19 February 1949	Wolverhampton Wanderers	A	3–1	54,536	
26 February 1949	Bolton Wanderers	H	5–0	50,263	
5 March 1949	Burnley	A	1–1	20,810	
12 March 1949	Preston North End	H	0–0	54,977	
19 March 1949	Newcastle United	A	2–3	55,548	
2 April 1949	Birmingham City	A	1–1	38,868	
9 April 1949	Middlesbrough	H	1–1	51,540	
15 April 1949	Blackpool	A	1–1	28,818	
16 April 1949	Everton	A	0–0	56,987	
18 April 1949	Blackpool	H	2–0	45,047	
23 April 1949	Chelsea	H	1–2	54,604	
27 April 1949	Manchester City	A	3–0	41,321	
4 May 1949	Portsmouth	H	3–2	56,973	
7 May 1949	Charlton Athletic	H	2–0	47,564	

==== Final League table ====
Pos	Team	Pld	W	D	L	GF	GA	GAv	Pts
3	Derby County	42	22	9	11	74	55	1.345	53
4	Newcastle United	42	20	12	10	70	56	1.250	52
5	Arsenal	42	18	13	11	74	44	1.682	49
6	Wolverhampton Wanderers	42	17	12	13	79	66	1.197	46
7	Manchester City	42	15	15	12	47	51	0.922	45

Source: World Football
Rules for classification: 1) Points; 2) Goal average; 3) Goals scored

=== FA Cup ===
Arsenal entered the FA Cup in the third round, in which they were drawn to face Tottenham Hotspur.

Round	Date	Opponent	Venue	Result	Attendance	Goalscorers
R3	8 January 1949	Tottenham Hotspur	H	3–0	47,314	
R4	29 January 1949	Derby County	A	0–1	31,079	

== See also ==
- 1948–49 in English football
- List of Arsenal F.C. seasons
