= 1920–21 Arsenal F.C. season =

English football club season

Arsenal
1920–21 season
- Chairman: Henry Norris
- Manager: Leslie Knighton
- Stadium: Highbury
- First Division: 9th
- FA Cup: 1st Round
Home colours	Away colours

The 1920–21 season was Arsenal's 2nd consecutive season in the top division of English football after playing in the London Combination league for several years. The team played 42 games, of which it won 15, drew 14, and lost 13. They finished 9th in the league.

== Results ==
Arsenal's score comes first

=== Legend ===
Win	Draw	Loss

=== Football League First Division ===
Date	Opponent	Venue	Result	Attendance	Scorers
28 August 1920	Aston Villa	A	0–5		
30 August 1920	Manchester United	H	2–0		
4 September 1920	Aston Villa	H	0–1		
6 September 1920	Manchester United	A	1-1		
11 September 1920	Manchester City	H	2–1		
18 September 1920	Manchester City	A	1–3		
25 September 1920	Middlesbrough	H	2–2		
2 October 1920	Middlesbrough	A	1–2		
9 October 1920	Bolton Wanderers	H	0–0		
16 October 1920	Bolton Wanderers	A	1–1		
23 October 1920	Derby County	A	1–1		
30 October 1920	Derby County	H	2–0		
6 November 1920	Blackburn Rovers	A	2–2		
13 November 1920	Blackburn Rovers	H	2–0		
20 November 1920	Huddersfield Town	A	4–0		
27 November 1920	Huddersfield Town	H	2–0		
4 December 1920	Chelsea	A	2–1		
11 December 1920	Chelsea	H	1–1		
18 December 1920	Bradford City	A	1–3		
25 December 1920	Everton	A	4–2		
27 December 1920	Everton	H	1–1		
1 January 1921	Bradford City	H	1–2		
15 January 1921	Tottenham Hotspur	A	1–2		
22 January 1921	Tottenham Hotspur	H	3–2		
29 January 1921	Sunderland	H	1–2		
5 February 1921	Sunderland	A	1–5		
12 February 1921	Oldham Athletic	A	1–1		
19 February 1921	Oldham Athletic	H	2–2		
26 February 1921	Preston North End	A	1–0		
12 March 1921	Burnley	A	0–1		
19 March 1921	Burnley	H	1–1		
26 March 1921	Sheffield United	H	2–6		
28 March 1921	West Bromwich Albion	H	2–1		
29 March 1921	West Bromwich Albion	A	4–3		
2 April 1921	Sheffield United	A	1–1		
9 April 1921	Bradford Park Avenue	H	2–1		
16 April 1921	Bradford Park Avenue	A	1–0		
23 April 1921	Newcastle United	H	1–1		
25 April 1921	Preston North End	H	2–1		
30 April 1921	Newcastle United	A	0–1		
2 May 1921	Liverpool	H	0–0		
7 May 1921	Liverpool	A	0–3		

==== Final League table ====
Pos	Team	Pld	W	D	L	GF	GA	GAv	Pts
7	Everton	42	17	13	12	66	55	1.200	47
8	Middlesbrough	42	17	12	13	53	53	1.000	46
9	Arsenal	42	15	14	13	59	63	0.937	44
10	Aston Villa	42	18	7	17	63	70	0.900	43
11	Blackburn Rovers	42	13	15	14	57	59	0.966	41

Source: World Football
Rules for classification: 1) Points; 2) Goal average; 3) Goals scored

=== FA Cup ===
Round	Date	Opponent	Venue	Result	Attendance	Goalscorers
R1	8 January 1921	Queen's Park Rangers	A	0–2		

== See also ==
- 1920–21 in English football
- List of Arsenal F.C. seasons
