= 1924–25 Arsenal F.C. season =

English football club season

Arsenal
1924–25 season
- Chairman: Henry Norris
- Manager: Leslie Knighton
- Stadium: Highbury
- First Division: 20th
- FA Cup: First round
- Top goalscorer: League: Jimmy Brain (12); All: Jimmy Brain (14)
- Highest home attendance: 51,000 vs. Tottenham Hotspur (25 October 1924)
- Lowest home attendance: 5,582 vs. Chelsea (27 October 1924)
Home colours	Away colours

The 1924–25 season was Arsenal's sixth season in the top division of English football.

== Results ==
Arsenal's score comes first

=== Legend ===
Win	Draw	Loss

=== Football League First Division ===
Date	Opponent	Venue	Result	Attendance	Scorers
30 August 1924	Nottingham Forest	A	2–0		
1 September 1924	Manchester City	H	1–0		
6 September 1924	Liverpool	H	2–0		
13 September 1924	Newcastle United	A	2–2		
17 September 1924	Manchester City	A	0–2		
20 September 1924	Sheffield United	H	2–0		
27 September 1924	West Ham United	A	0–1		
4 October 1924	Blackburn Rovers	H	1–0		
11 October 1924	Huddersfield Town	A	0–4		
13 October 1924	Bury	H	0–1		
18 October 1924	Aston Villa	H	1–1		
25 October 1924	Tottenham Hotspur	H	1–0		
1 November 1924	Bolton Wanderers	A	1–4		
8 November 1924	Nots County	H	0–1		
15 November 1924	Everton	A	3–2		
22 November 1924	Sunderland	H	0–0		
29 November 1924	Cardiff City	A	1–1		
6 December 1924	Preston North End	H	4–0		
13 December 1924	Burnley	A	0–1		
20 December 1924	Leeds United	H	6–1		
25 December 1924	Birmingham	A	1–2		
26 December 1924	Birmingham	H	0–1		
27 December 1924	Nottingham Forest	H	2–1		
3 January 1925	Liverpool	A	1–2		
17 January 1925	Newcastle United	H	0–2		
24 January 1925	Sheffield United	A	1–2		
7 February 1925	Blackburn Rovers	A	0–1		
14 February 1925	Huddersfield Town	H	0–5		
28 February 1925	Tottenham Hotspur	A	0–2		
7 March 1925	Bolton Wanderers	H	1–0		
14 March 1925	Notts County	A	1–2		
21 March 1925	Everton	H	3–1		
23 March 1925	West Ham United	H	1–2		
28 March 1925	Sunderland	A	0–2		
1 April 1925	Aston Villa	A	0–1		
4 April 1925	Cardiff City	H	1–1		
11 April 1925	Preston North End	A	0–2		
13 April 1925	West Bromwich Albion	A	0–2		
14 April 1925	West Bromwich Albion	H	2–0		
18 April 1925	Burnley	H	5–0		
25 April 1925	Leeds United	A	0–1		
2 May 1925	Bury	A	0–2		

==== Final League table ====
Pos	Team	Pld	W	D	L	GF	GA	GAv	Pts	Relegation
18	Leeds United	42	11	12	19	46	59	0.780	34	
19	Burnley	42	11	12	19	46	75	0.613	34	
20	Arsenal	42	14	5	23	46	58	0.793	33	
21	Preston North End (R)	42	10	6	26	37	74	0.500	26	Relegation to the Second Division
22	Nottingham Forest (R)	42	6	12	24	29	65	0.446	24	Relegation to the Second Division

Source: World Football
Rules for classification: 1) Points; 2) Goal average; 3) Goals scored
(R) Relegated

=== FA Cup ===
Arsenal entered the FA Cup in the first round proper, in which they were drawn to face West Ham United.

Round	Date	Opponent	Venue	Result	Attendance	Goalscorers
R1	14 January 1925	West Ham United	A	0–0	26,000	
R1 R	21 January 1925	West Ham United	H	2–2	34,160	Brain (2)
R1 2R	26 January 1925	West Ham United	N	0–1	36,955	

== See also ==
- 1924–25 in English football
- List of Arsenal F.C. seasons
