= 1919–20 Arsenal F.C. season =

English football club season

Arsenal
1919–20 season
- Chairman: Henry Norris
- Manager: Leslie Knighton
- Stadium: Highbury
- First Division: 10th
- FA Cup: 2nd Round
Home colours	Away colours

In the 1919–20 season, the Arsenal F.C. played 42 games, of which it won 15, drew 12 and lost 15. The team finished 10th in the league.

== Results ==
Arsenal's score comes first

=== Legend ===
Win	Draw	Loss

=== Football League First Division ===
Date	Opponent	Venue	Result	Attendance	Scorers
30 August 1919	Newcastle United	H	0–1	40,000	
1 September 1919	Liverpool	A	3–2	12,000	
6 September 1919	Newcastle United	A	1–3	45,000	
8 September 1919	Liverpool	H	1–0	20,000	
13 September 1919	Sunderland	A	1–1	30,000	
20 September 1919	Sunderland	H	3–2	42,000	
27 September 1919	Blackburn Rovers	A	2–2	5,000	
4 October 1919	Blackburn Rovers	H	0–1	30,000	
11 October 1919	Everton	A	0–0	35,000	
18 October 1919	Everton	H	1–1	30,000	
25 October 1919	Bradford City	H	1–2	35,000	
1 November 1919	Bradford City	A	1–1	16,000	
8 November 1919	Bolton Wanderers	H	2–2	30,000	
15 November 1919	Bolton Wanderers	A	2–2	20,000	
22 November 1919	Notts County	H	3–1	25,000	
29 November 1919	Notts County	A	2–2	6,000	
6 December 1919	Chelsea	H	1–1	50,000	
13 December 1919	Chelsea	A	1–3	60,000	
20 December 1919	Sheffield Wednesday	H	3–1	25,000	
25 December 1919	Derby County	A	1–2	14,000	
26 December 1919	Derby County	H	1–0	20,000	
27 December 1919	Sheffield Wednesday	A	2–1	23,000	
3 January 1920	Manchester City	H	2–2	32,000	
17 January 1920	Manchester City	A	1–4	25,000	
24 January 1920	Aston Villa	H	0–1	55,000	
7 February 1920	Oldham Athletic	H	3–2	32,000	
11 February 1920	Aston Villa	A	1–2	20,000	
14 February 1920	Oldham Athletic	A	0–3	14,000	
21 February 1920	Manchester United	H	0–3	25,000	
28 February 1920	Manchester United	A	1–0	30,000	
6 March 1920	Sheffield United	A	0–2	25,000	
13 March 1920	Sheffield United	H	3–0	35,000	
20 March 1920	Middlesbrough	A	0–1	22,000	
27 March 1920	Middlesbrough	H	2–1	25,000	
3 April 1920	Burnley	A	1–2	20,000	
5 April 1920	West Bromwich Albion	H	1–0	40,000	
6 April 1920	West Bromwich Albion	A	0–1	46,000	
10 April 1920	Burnley	H	2–0	20,000	
17 April 1920	Preston North End	A	1–1	13,000	
24 April 1920	Preston North End	H	0–0	35,000	
28 April 1920	Bradford Park Avenue	A	0–0	7,000	
1 May 1920	Bradford Park Avenue	H	3–0	30,000	

==== Final League table ====
Pos	Team	Pld	W	D	L	GF	GA	GAv	Pts
8	Newcastle United	42	17	9	16	44	39	1.128	43
9	Aston Villa	42	18	6	18	75	73	1.027	42
10	Arsenal	42	15	12	15	56	58	0.966	42
11	Bradford (Park Avenue)	42	15	12	15	60	63	0.952	42
12	Manchester United	42	13	14	15	54	50	1.080	40

Source: World Football
Rules for classification: 1) Points; 2) Goal average; 3) Goals scored

People now thought that Arsenal beat Manchester United 29-0

=== FA Cup ===
Round	Date	Opponent	Venue	Result	Attendance	Goalscorers
R1	10 January 1920	Rochdale	H	4–2	26,596	
R2	31 January 1920	Bristol City	A	0–1	25,900	

== See also ==
- 1919–20 in English football
- List of Arsenal F.C. seasons
