= 1935–36 Arsenal F.C. season =

English football club season

Arsenal
1935–36 season
- Chairman: Samuel Hill-Wood
- Manager: George Allison
- Stadium: Highbury
- First Division: 6th
- FA Cup: Winners

The 1935–36 season was Arsenal's 17th consecutive season in the top division of English football. They won the FA Cup for the second time in their history, after failing to retain the league for the third time running after finishing 6th, eleven points off champions Sunderland. The Gunners faced Sheffield United in the final at Wembley, and narrowly won 1-0 thanks to a Ted Drake goal. They had beaten Bristol Rovers, Liverpool, Newcastle (after a replay), Barnsley and Grimsby Town en route to Wembley. Early in the season, Arsenal had lost the Charity Shield 1–0 to Sheffield Wednesday, but two months later claimed their biggest win of the season, 7–1 at Aston Villa, with Ted Drake setting the all-time record for the most goals in one English top division match, after scoring all seven goals. He would finish as the club's top scorer that season with 24 league goals and 3 in the FA Cup.

== Results ==
Arsenal's score comes first

=== Legend ===
Win	Draw	Loss

=== Football League First Division ===
Date	Opponent	Venue	Result	Attendance	Scorers
31 August 1935	Sunderland	H	3–1	66,428	Drake 2, Bastin
3 September 1935	Grimsby Town	A	0–1	25,978	
7 September 1935	Birmingham	A	1–1	42,804	Drake
11 September 1935	Grimsby Town	H	6–0	33,633	Milne 3, Drake, Bowden, Beasley
14 September 1935	Sheffield Wednesday	H	2–2	59,462	Drake, Milne
18 September 1935	Leeds United	A	1–1	24,283	Drake
21 September 1935	Manchester City	H	2–3	61,290	Bastin, James
28 September 1935	Stoke City	A	3–0	45,570	Crayston, Bastin 2
5 October 1935	Blackburn Rovers	H	5–1	45,981	Bowden 3, Milne, Bastin
12 October 1935	Chelsea	A	1–1	82,905	Crayston
19 October 1935	Portsmouth	A	1–2	34,165	Milne
26 October 1935	Preston North End	H	2–1	42,126	Drake, Bastin
2 November 1935	Brentford	A	1–2	26,330	Parkin
9 November 1935	Derby County	H	1–1	54,027	Drake
16 November 1935	Everton	A	2–0	46,990	Drake, Bastin
23 November 1935	Wolverhampton Wanderers	H	4–0	39,860	Hulme, Drake 2, Rogers
30 November 1935	Huddersfield Town	A	0–0	35,816	
9 December 1935	Middlesbrough	H	2–0	23,365	Rogers 2
14 December 1935	Aston Villa	A	7–1	58,469	Drake 7
25 December 1935	Liverpool	A	1–0	45,899	Hulme
26 December 1935	Liverpool	H	1–2	57,035	Hulme
28 December 1935	Sunderland	A	4–5	58,773	own goal, Bastin, Drake, Bowden
4 January 1936	Birmingham	H	1–1	44,534	Drake
18 January 1936	Sheffield Wednesday	A	2–3	35,576	Roberts, Drake
1 February 1936	Stoke City	H	1–0	49,347	Drake
8 February 1936	Blackburn Rovers	A	1–0	24,998	Crayston
22 February 1936	Portsmouth	H	2–3	21,728	Compton, Dougall
4 March 1936	Derby County	A	4–0	17,390	Cox, Dougall, Kirchen, Crayston
7 March 1936	Huddersfield Town	H	1–1	43,930	Bastin
11 March 1936	Manchester City	A	0–1	32,750	
14 March 1936	Preston North End	A	0–1	30,039	
25 March 1936	Everton	H	1–1	18,693	Hulme
28 March 1936	Wolverhampton Wanderers	A	2–2	32,330	Kirchen, Beasley
1 April 1936	Bolton Wanderers	H	1–1	10,485	Westcott
4 April 1936	Brentford	H	1–1	28,303	Dougall
10 April 1936	West Bromwich Albion	H	4–0	61,545	Crayston, Hulme, Dunne, James
11 April 1936	Middlesbrough	A	2–2	31,006	Bowden, Bastin
13 April 1936	West Bromwich Albion	A	0–1	52,586	
18 April 1936	Aston Villa	H	1–0	55,431	Drake
27 April 1936	Chelsea	H	1–1	40,432	Drake
29 April 1936	Bolton Wanderers	A	1–2	29,479	Hulme
2 May 1936	Leeds United	H	2–2	25,920	Bastin, Kirchen

==== Final League table ====
Pos	Team	Pld	W	D	L	GF	GA	GAv	Pts
4	Stoke City	42	20	7	15	57	57	1.000	47
5	Brentford	42	17	12	13	81	60	1.350	46
6	Arsenal	42	15	15	12	78	48	1.625	45
7	Preston North End	42	18	8	16	67	64	1.047	44
8	Chelsea	42	15	13	14	65	72	0.903	43

Source: World Football
Rules for classification: 1) Points; 2) Goal average; 3) Goals scored

=== FA Cup ===
Arsenal entered the FA Cup in the third round, in which they were drawn to face Bristol Rovers.

Round	Date	Opponent	Venue	Result	Attendance	Goalscorers
R3	11 January 1936	Bristol Rovers	A	5–1	24,234	
R4	25 January 1936	Liverpool	A	2–0	53,720	
R5	15 February 1936	Newcastle United	A	3–3	65,484	
R5 R	19 February 1936	Newcastle United	H	3–0	62,391	
R6	29 February 1936	Barnsley	H	4–1	60,420	
SF	21 March 1936	Grimsby Town	N	1–0	63,210	
F	25 April 1936	Sheffield United	N	1–0	93,384	

== See also ==
- 1935–36 in English football
- List of Arsenal F.C. seasons
