= 1922–23 Arsenal F.C. season =

English football club season

Arsenal
1922–23 season
- Chairman: Henry Norris
- Manager: Leslie Knighton
- Stadium: Highbury
- First Division: 11th
- FA Cup: First round
- Top goalscorer: League: Bob Turnbull (20); All: Bob Turnbull (21)
- Highest home attendance: 55,000 vs. Tottenham Hotspur (30 September 1922)
- Lowest home attendance: 11,027 vs. Tottenham Hotspur (23 November 1922)
Home colours	Away colours

The 1922–23 season was Arsenal's fourth consecutive season in the top division of English football.

== Results ==
Arsenal's score comes first

=== Legend ===
Win	Draw	Loss

=== Football League First Division ===
Date	Opponent	Venue	Result	Attendance	Scorers
26 August 1922	Liverpool	A	2–5		
28 August 1922	Burnley	H	1–1		
2 September 1922	Liverpool	H	1–0		
4 September 1922	Burnley	A	1–4		
9 September 1922	Cardiff City	A	1–4		
16 September 1922	Cardiff City	H	2–1		
23 September 1922	Tottenham Hotspur	A	2–1		
30 September 1922	Tottenham Hotspur	H	0–2		
2 October 1922	Sheffield United	A	1–2		
7 October 1922	West Bromwich Albion	H	3–1		
14 October 1922	West Bromwich Albion	A	0–7		
21 October 1922	Newcastle United	A	1–1		
28 October 1922	Newcastle United	H	1–2		
4 November 1922	Everton	A	0–1		
11 November 1922	Everton	H	1–2		
18 November 1922	Sunderland	A	3–3		
25 November 1922	Sunderland	H	2–3		
2 December 1922	Birmingham	A	2–3		
9 December 1922	Birmingham	H	1–0		
16 December 1922	Huddersfield Town	H	1–1		
23 December 1922	Huddersfield Town	A	0–4		
25 December 1922	Bolton Wanderers	A	1–4		
26 December 1922	Bolton Wanderers	H	5–0		
30 December 1922	Stoke	H	3–0		
1 January 1923	Blackburn Rovers	A	5–0		
6 January 1923	Stoke	A	0–1		
20 January 1923	Manchester City	H	1–0		
27 January 1923	Manchester City	A	0–0		
3 February 1923	Nottingham Forest	A	1–2		
10 February 1923	Nottingham Forest	H	2–0		
17 February 1923	Chelsea	A	0–0		
24 February 1923	Chelsea	H	3–1		
3 March 1923	Middlesbrough	A	0–2		
10 March 1923	Middlesbrough	H	3–0		
17 March 1923	Oldham Athletic	H	2–0		
24 March 1923	Oldham Athletic	A	0–0		
31 March 1923	Aston Villa	H	2–0		
2 April 1923	Blackburn Rovers	H	1–1		
7 April 1923	Aston Villa	A	1–1		
14 April 1923	Preston North End	H	1–1		
21 April 1923	Preston North End	A	2–1		
28 April 1923	Sheffield United	H	2–0		

==== Final League table ====
Pos	Team	Pld	W	D	L	GF	GA	GAv	Pts
9	Cardiff City	42	18	7	17	73	59	1.237	43
10	Sheffield United	42	16	10	16	68	64	1.063	42
11	Arsenal	42	16	10	16	61	62	0.984	42
12	Tottenham Hotspur	42	17	7	18	50	50	1.000	41
13	Bolton Wanderers	42	14	12	16	50	58	0.862	40

Source: World Football
Rules for classification: 1) Points; 2) Goal average; 3) Goals scored

=== FA Cup ===
Arsenal entered the FA Cup in the first round proper, in which they were drawn to face Liverpool.

Round	Date	Opponent	Venue	Result	Attendance	Goalscorers
R1	13 January 1923	Liverpool	A	0–0	37,000	
R2	17 January 1923	Liverpool	H	1–4	39,000	Turnbull

== See also ==
- 1922–23 in English football
- List of Arsenal F.C. seasons
