= 1936–37 Arsenal F.C. season =

English football club season

Arsenal
1936–37 season
- Chairman: Bernard Forbes, 8th Earl of Granard
- Manager: George Allison
- Stadium: Highbury
- First Division: 3rd
- FA Cup: Sixth Round
Home colours	Away colours

The 1936–37 season was Arsenal's 18th consecutive season in the top division of English football.

== Results ==
Arsenal's score comes first

=== Legend ===
Win	Draw	Loss

=== Football League First Division ===
Date	Opponent	Venue	Result	Attendance	Scorers
29 August 1936	Everton	H	3–2	50,321	Bowden, Hapgood, James
3 September 1936	Brentford	A	0–2	31,056	
5 September 1936	Huddersfield Town	A	0–0	32,013	
9 September 1936	Brentford	H	1–1	44,010	Drake
12 September 1936	Sunderland	H	4–1	56,820	Crayston, Beasley, Roberts, Bastin
19 September 1936	Wolverhampton Wanderers	A	0–2	53,097	
26 September 1936	Derby County	H	2–2	61,390	Compton, Drake
3 October 1936	Manchester United	A	0–2	55,884	
10 October 1936	Sheffield Wednesday	H	1–1	46,421	Drake
17 October 1936	Charlton Athletic	A	2–0	68,160	Davidson, Compton
24 October 1936	Grimsby Town	H	0–0	51,202	
31 October 1936	Liverpool	A	1–2	39,251	Kirchen
7 November 1936	Leeds United	H	3–1	32,535	Drake, Kirchen, Milne, Davidson
14 November 1936	Birmingham	A	3–1	39,940	Drake (2), Kirchen
21 November 1936	Middlesbrough	H	5–3	44,829	Bowden, Bastin, Milne (2), Drake
28 November 1936	West Bromwich Albion	A	4–2	35,409	Drake (2), Milne (2)
5 December 1936	Manchester City	H	1–3	41,783	Drake
12 December 1936	Portsmouth	A	5–1	32,184	Davidson (4), Drake
19 December 1936	Chelsea	H	4–1	49,917	Kirchen (2), Drake, Davidson
25 December 1936	Preston North End	H	4–1	42,781	Drake (2), Milne, Kirchen
26 December 1936	Everton	A	1–1	59,440	Kirchen
28 December 1936	Preston North End	A	3–1	25,787	Nelson, Milne, Kirchen
1 January 1937	Bolton Wanderers	A	5–0	42,171	Drake (4), Milne
2 January 1937	Huddersfield Town	H	1–1	44,224	Kirchen
9 January 1937	Sunderland	A	1–1	54,694	Milne
23 January 1937	Wolverhampton Wanderers	H	3–0	33,896	Bowden, Bastin, Drake
3 February 1937	Derby County	A	4–5	22,064	Bastin, own goal, Drake, Kirchen
6 February 1937	Manchester United	H	1–1	37,236	Davidson
13 February 1937	Sheffield Wednesday	A	0–0	35,813	
24 February 1937	Charlton Athletic	H	1–1	60,568	Kirchen
27 February 1937	Grimsby Town	A	3–1	18,216	Kirchen (3)
10 March 1937	Liverpool	H	1–0	16,145	Kirchen
13 March 1937	Leeds United	A	4–3	25,148	Kirchen (2), Bowden, Bastin
20 March 1937	Birmingham City	H	1–1	46,086	Bowden
26 March 1937	Stoke City	H	0–0	59,495	
27 March 1937	Middlesbrough	A	1–1	44,523	Bowden
29 March 1937	Stoke City	A	0–0	51,480	
3 April 1937	West Bromwich Albion	H	2–0	38,773	Nelson, Davidson
10 April 1937	Manchester City	A	0–2	74,918	
17 April 1937	Portsmouth	H	4–0	29,098	Compton, Nelson, Kirchen
24 April 1937	Chelsea	A	0–2	53,325	
1 May 1937	Bolton Wanderers	H	0–0	22,875	

==== Final League table ====
Pos	Team	Pld	W	D	L	GF	GA	GAv	Pts
1	Manchester City (C)	42	22	13	7	107	61	1.754	57
2	Charlton Athletic	42	21	12	9	58	49	1.184	54
3	Arsenal	42	18	16	8	80	49	1.633	52
4	Derby County	42	21	7	14	96	90	1.067	49
5	Wolverhampton Wanderers	42	21	5	16	84	67	1.254	47

Source: World Football
Rules for classification: 1) Points; 2) Goal average; 3) Goals scored
(C) Champions

=== FA Cup ===
Arsenal entered the FA Cup in the third round, in which they were drawn to face Chesterfield.

Round	Date	Opponent	Venue	Result	Attendance	Goalscorers
R3	16 January 1937	Chesterfield	A	5–1	21,786	
R4	30 January 1937	Manchester United	H	5–0	45,697	
R5	20 February 1937	Burnley	A	7–1	54,445	
R6	6 March 1937	West Bromwich Albion	A	1–3	64,815	

== See also ==
- 1936–37 in English football
- List of Arsenal F.C. seasons
