= 1907–08 Woolwich Arsenal F.C. season =

English football club season

Woolwich Arsenal
1907–08 season
- Chairman: George Leavey
- Manager: Phil Kelso (to February); George Morrell (from February)
- Stadium: Manor Ground
- First Division: 15th
- FA Cup: 1st Round

== Results ==
Arsenal's score comes first

Win	Draw	Loss

=== Football League First Division ===
Date	Opponent	Venue	Result	Attendance	Scorers
2 September 1907	Notts County	H	1–1		
7 September 1907	Bristol City	H	0–4		
9 September 1907	Bury	A	2–3		
14 September 1907	Notts County	A	0–2		
21 September 1907	Manchester City	H	2–1		
28 September 1907	Preston North End	A	0–3		
5 October 1907	Bury	H	0–0		
12 October 1907	Aston Villa	A	1–0		
19 October 1907	Liverpool	H	2–1		
26 October 1907	Middlesbrough	A	0–0		
2 November 1907	Sheffield United	H	5–1		
9 November 1907	Chelsea	A	1–2		
16 November 1907	Nottingham Forest	H	3–1		
23 November 1907	Manchester United	A	2–4		
30 November 1907	Blackburn Rovers	H	2–0		
7 December 1907	Bolton Wanderers	A	1–3		
14 December 1907	Birmingham	H	1–1		
21 December 1907	Everton	A	1–1		
25 December 1907	Newcastle United	H	2–2		
28 December 1907	Sunderland	H	4–0		
31 December 1907	The Wednesday	A	0–6		
1 January 1908	Sunderland	A	2–5		
4 January 1908	Bristol City	A	2–1		
18 January 1908	Manchester City	A	0–4		
25 January 1908	Preston North End	H	1–1		
8 February 1908	Aston Villa	A	0–1		
15 February 1908	Liverpool	A	1–4		
22 February 1908	Middlesbrough	H	4–1		
29 February 1908	Sheffield United	A	2–2		
7 March 1908	Chelsea	H	0–0		
14 March 1908	Nottingham Forest	A	0–1		
21 March 1908	Manchester United	H	1–0		
28 March 1908	Blackburn Rovers	A	1–1		
4 April 1908	Bolton Wanderers	H	1–1		
11 April 1908	Birmingham	A	2–1		
17 April 1908	Newcastle United	A	1–2		
18 April 1908	Everton	H	2–1		
20 April 1908	The Wednesday	H	1–1		

==== Final League table ====
Pos	Team	Pld	W	D	L	GF	GA	GAv	Pts	Relegation
1	Manchester United (C)	38	23	6	9	81	48	1.688	52	
2	Aston Villa	38	17	9	12	77	59	1.305	43	
3	Manchester City	38	16	11	11	62	54	1.148	43	
4	Newcastle United	38	15	12	11	65	54	1.204	42	
5	The Wednesday	38	19	4	15	73	64	1.141	42	
6	Middlesbrough	38	17	7	14	54	45	1.200	41	
7	Bury	38	14	11	13	58	61	0.951	39	
8	Liverpool	38	16	6	16	68	61	1.115	38	
9	Nottingham Forest	38	13	11	14	59	62	0.952	37	
10	Bristol City	38	12	12	14	58	61	0.951	36	
11	Everton	38	15	6	17	58	64	0.906	36	
12	Preston North End	38	12	12	14	47	53	0.887	36	
13	Chelsea	38	14	8	16	53	62	0.855	36	
14	Blackburn Rovers	38	12	12	14	51	63	0.810	36	
15	Woolwich Arsenal	38	12	12	14	51	63	0.810	36	
16	Sunderland	38	16	3	19	78	75	1.040	35	
17	Sheffield United	38	12	11	15	52	58	0.897	35	
18	Notts County	38	13	8	17	39	51	0.765	34	
19	Bolton Wanderers (R)	38	14	5	19	52	58	0.897	33	Relegation to the Second Division
20	Birmingham (R)	38	9	12	17	40	60	0.667	30	Relegation to the Second Division

Source: World Football
Rules for classification: 1) Points; 2) Goal average; 3) Goals scored
(C) Champions; (R) Relegated

=== FA Cup ===
Round	Date	Opponent	Venue	Result	Attendance	Goalscorers
R1	11 January 1908	Hull City	H	0–0		
R1 R	16 January 1908	Hull City	A	1–4		
