= 1894–95 Woolwich Arsenal F.C. season =

English football club season

Woolwich Arsenal
1894–95 season
- Stadium: Manor Ground
- Second Division: 8th
- FA Cup: First Round

In the 1894–95 season, the Woolwich Arsenal F.C. played 30 games, won 14, draw 6 and lost 10. The team finished 8th in the season

== Results ==
Win	Draw	Loss

=== Football League Second Division ===
==== Final League table ====
Pos	Team	Pld	W	D	L	GF	GA	GAv	Pts
6	Darwen	30	16	4	10	74	43	1.721	36
7	Burton Wanderers	30	14	7	9	67	39	1.718	35
8	Woolwich Arsenal	30	14	6	10	75	58	1.293	34
9	Manchester City	30	14	3	13	82	72	1.139	31
10	Newcastle United	30	12	3	15	72	84	0.857	27

Rules for classification: 1) Points; 2) Goal average; 3) Goals scored
