= 1892–93 Royal Arsenal F.C. season =

English football club season

Royal Arsenal F.C.
1892–93 season
- Stadium: Invicta Ground

The 1892–93 Royal Arsenal season was their seventh since foundation as Dial Square F.C., and their fourth since their first official entry into the FA Cup. This campaign turned out to be one of the most tumultuous in the clubs history. After elimination in the first round proper of the FA Cup to Sunderland in late January, the club was taken to court by former centre-forward George Davie, who demanded fifty pounds for breach of contract earlier in the season.

Davie had initially been signed in October 1891, but an especially successful first season-wherein he netted 32 times in just 47 matches-Davie was re-signed by the club in the off-season of 1892. The club requested that Davie train twice per day, but an injury picked up in early September meant he only appeared in 54 of the required 156 sessions. Royal Arsenal perceived it as indiscipline on Davie's part, and terminated his contract in December of that year. But Davie argued the cause was simply down to his injury, and duly took the club to court to claim his fifty pounds. The day-long hearing ended with the jury finding for Royal Arsenal, and after this defeat Davie returned to his home country Scotland.

Around the same time, the club was informed that George Weaver, landlord of the home ground Invicta Ground, had doubled the £200 rent to a mammoth £400, and so the club returned to Manor Field. The club also moved headquarters to the Lord Derby pub, and in early May morphed into Woolwich Arsenal.

Meanwhile, the on-field season began with a home tie against Highland Light Infantry; the game was comfortably won 3–0, with the aforementioned Davie scoring alongside Arthur Elliot and captain Charles Booth. The club then won a record game against City Ramblers 10–1, with James Henderson, Elliot, and Booth all scoring hat-tricks(another record) alongside another Davie goal. The side then narrowly beat Millwall 3–2 with David Howat and Henderson scoring alongside the first competitive own goal that Royal Arsenal had ever profited from-scored by goalkeeper Obed Caygill. Gavin Crawford, Henderson and Booth all scored in a 3–0 victory over Clapton to ensure qualification into the first round proper of the FA Cup, but the side were thrashed 6-0 by Sunderland, conceding five first-half goals en route to elimination at that stage yet again.

== Results ==
Date	Opponent	Ground	Comp.	Score	Goalscorer(s)	Attendance
15 October 1892	Highland Light Infantry	H	FAC	3–0	Davie, Elliot, Booth	5,000
29 October 1892	City Ramblers	H	FAC	10–1	Henderson 3, Davie, Elliot 3, Booth 3	4,000
19 November 1892	Millwall Athletic	H	FAC	3–2	Howat, Henderson, Caygill(og)	12,000
10 December 1892	Clapton	H	FAC	3–0	Crawford, Henderson, Booth	4,000
21 January 1893	Sunderland	A	FAC	0–6		4,500
