= 1906–07 Woolwich Arsenal F.C. season =

English football club season

Woolwich Arsenal
1906–07 season
- Chairman: George Leavey
- Manager: Phil Kelso
- Stadium: Manor Ground
- First Division: 7th
- FA Cup: Semi-Finalists

In the 1906–07 season, the Woolwich Arsenal F.C. played 38 games, won 20, draw 4 and lost 14. The team finished 7th in the league.

== Results ==
Arsenal's score comes first

| Win | Draw | Loss |

=== Football League First Division ===
| Date | Opponent | Venue | Result | Attendance | Scorers |
|---|---|---|---|---|---|
| 1 September 1906 | Manchester City | A | 4–1 | | |
| 3 September 1906 | Bury | A | 1–4 | | |
| 8 September 1906 | Middlesbrough | H | 2–0 | | |
| 15 September 1906 | Preston North End | A | 3–0 | | |
| 22 September 1906 | Newcastle United | H | 2–0 | | |
| 29 September 1906 | Aston Villa | A | 2–2 | | |
| 6 October 1906 | Liverpool | H | 2–1 | | |
| 13 October 1906 | Bristol City | A | 3–1 | | |
| 20 October 1906 | Notts County | H | 1–0 | | |
| 27 October 1906 | Sheffield United | A | 2–4 | | |
| 3 November 1906 | Bolton Wanderers | H | 2–2 | | |
| 10 November 1906 | Manchester United | A | 0–1 | | |
| 17 November 1906 | Stoke | H | 2–1 | | |
| 24 November 1906 | Blackburn Rovers | A | 3–2 | | |
| 1 December 1906 | Sunderland | H | 0–1 | | |
| 8 December 1906 | Birmingham | A | 1–5 | | |
| 15 December 1906 | Everton | H | 3–1 | | |
| 22 December 1906 | Derby County | A | 0–0 | | |
| 26 December 1906 | Bury | H | 3–1 | | |
| 29 December 1906 | Manchester City | H | 4–1 | | |
| 1 January 1907 | The Wednesday | A | 1–1 | | |
| 5 January 1907 | Middlesbrough | A | 3–5 | | |
| 19 January 1907 | Preston North End | H | 1–0 | | |
| 26 January 1907 | Newcastle United | A | 0–1 | | |
| 9 February 1907 | Liverpool | A | 0–4 | | |
| 16 February 1907 | Bristol City | H | 1–2 | | |
| 2 March 1907 | Sheffield United | H | 0–1 | | |
| 16 March 1907 | Manchester United | H | 4–0 | | |
| 27 March 1907 | Bolton Wanderers | A | 0–3 | | |
| 29 March 1907 | The Wednesday | H | 1–0 | | |
| 30 March 1907 | Blackburn Rovers | H | 2–0 | | |
| 1 April 1907 | Aston Villa | H | 3–1 | | |
| 6 April 1907 | Sunderland | A | 3–2 | | |
| 10 April 1907 | Everton | A | 1–2 | | |
| 13 April 1907 | Birmingham | H | 2–1 | | |
| 15 April 1907 | Stoke | A | 0–2 | | |
| 17 April 1907 | Notts County | A | 1–4 | | |
| 27 April 1907 | Derby County | H | 3–2 | | |

==== Final League table ====
| Pos | Team | Pld | W | D | L | GF | GA | GAv | Pts | Relegation |
|---|---|---|---|---|---|---|---|---|---|---|
| 1 | Newcastle United (C) | 38 | 22 | 7 | 9 | 74 | 46 | 1.609 | 51 | |
| 2 | Bristol City | 38 | 20 | 8 | 10 | 66 | 47 | 1.404 | 48 | |
| 3 | Everton | 38 | 20 | 5 | 13 | 70 | 46 | 1.522 | 45 | |
| 4 | Sheffield United | 38 | 17 | 11 | 10 | 57 | 55 | 1.036 | 45 | |
| 5 | Aston Villa | 38 | 19 | 6 | 13 | 78 | 52 | 1.500 | 44 | |
| 6 | Bolton Wanderers | 38 | 18 | 8 | 12 | 59 | 47 | 1.255 | 44 | |
| 7 | Woolwich Arsenal | 38 | 20 | 4 | 14 | 66 | 59 | 1.119 | 44 | |
| 8 | Manchester United | 38 | 17 | 8 | 13 | 53 | 56 | 0.946 | 42 | |
| 9 | Birmingham | 38 | 15 | 8 | 15 | 52 | 52 | 1.000 | 38 | |
| 10 | Sunderland | 38 | 14 | 9 | 15 | 65 | 66 | 0.985 | 37 | |
| 11 | Middlesbrough | 38 | 15 | 6 | 17 | 56 | 63 | 0.889 | 36 | |
| 12 | Blackburn Rovers | 38 | 14 | 7 | 17 | 56 | 59 | 0.949 | 35 | |
| 13 | The Wednesday | 38 | 12 | 11 | 15 | 49 | 60 | 0.817 | 35 | |
| 14 | Preston North End | 38 | 14 | 7 | 17 | 44 | 57 | 0.772 | 35 | |
| 15 | Liverpool | 38 | 13 | 7 | 18 | 64 | 65 | 0.985 | 33 | |
| 16 | Bury | 38 | 13 | 6 | 19 | 58 | 68 | 0.853 | 32 | |
| 17 | Manchester City | 38 | 10 | 12 | 16 | 53 | 77 | 0.688 | 32 | |
| 18 | Notts County | 38 | 8 | 15 | 15 | 46 | 50 | 0.920 | 31 | |
| 19 | Derby County (R) | 38 | 9 | 9 | 20 | 41 | 59 | 0.695 | 27 | Relegation to the Second Division |
| 20 | Stoke (R) | 38 | 8 | 10 | 20 | 41 | 64 | 0.641 | 26 | Relegation to the Second Division |

Source: World Football
Rules for classification: 1) Points; 2) Goal average; 3) Goals scored
(C) Champions; (R) Relegated

=== FA Cup ===
| Round | Date | Opponent | Venue | Result | Attendance | Goalscorers |
|---|---|---|---|---|---|---|
| R1 | 12 January 1907 | Grimsby Town | A | 1–1 | | |
| R1 R | 16 January 1907 | Grimsby Town | H | 3–0 | | |
| R2 | 2 February 1907 | Bristol City | H | 2–1 | | |
| R3 | 23 February 1907 | Bristol Rovers | H | 1–0 | | |
| R4 | 9 March 1907 | Barnsley | A | 2–1 | | |
| SF | 23 March 1907 | The Wednesday | N | 1–3 | | |
