= 1891–92 Royal Arsenal F.C. season =

English football club season

Royal Arsenal F.C.
1891–92 season
- Stadium: Invicta Ground

During the late 1880s and early 90s, Royal Arsenal started to win local trophies, winning both the Kent Senior Cup and London Charity Cup in 1889–90 and the London Senior Cup in 1890–91; they also entered the FA Cup for the first time in 1889–90. However, the gulf between Arsenal and the professional sides from the North soon became apparent, and Arsenal faced the threat of their amateur players being lured away by the money professional sides could offer; after Derby County had played Arsenal in an FA Cup tie in 1891, they attempted to sign two of Arsenal's amateur players on professional contracts. Royal Arsenal's move to professionalism in 1891 was frowned upon by many of the amateur southern clubs, and they were banned from participating in local competitions by the London Football Association. With friendlies and the FA Cup the only matches available for Royal Arsenal, they attempted to set up a southern equivalent of The Football League, but the move failed. The club changed its name to Woolwich Arsenal in 1893 when it formed a limited liability company to raise capital to purchase the Manor Ground. Woolwich Arsenal's future looked bleak until the Football League came to their rescue by inviting them to join in 1893. Arsenal were the first Southern club to enter the League, initially joining the Second Division; in response, some of the club's amateur players who rejected professionalism and wanted a workers' team to represent just the Royal Arsenal, broke away to form a short-lived alternative side, Royal Ordnance Factories.

== Results ==
Date	Opponent	Ground	Comp.	Score	Goalscorer(s)	Attendance
16 January 1892	Small Heath	A	FAC	1–5	Davie	4,000
