= 1905–06 Woolwich Arsenal F.C. season =

English football club season

Woolwich Arsenal
1905–06 season
- Chairman: George Leavey
- Manager: Phil Kelso
- Stadium: Manor Ground
- First Division: 12th
- FA Cup: Semi-Finalists

In the 1905–06 season, the Woolwich Arsenal F.C. played 38 games, won 15, draw 7 and lost 16. The team finished 12th in the league.

== Results ==
Arsenal's score comes first

Win	Draw	Loss

=== Football League First Division ===
Date	Opponent	Venue	Result	Attendance	Scorers
2 September 1905	Liverpool	H	3–1		
9 September 1905	Sheffield United	A	1–3		
16 September 1905	Notts County	H	1–1		
18 September 1905	Preston North End	H	2–2		
23 September 1905	Stoke	A	1–2		
30 September 1905	Bolton Wanderers	H	0–0		
7 October 1905	Wolverhampton Wanderers	A	2–0		
14 October 1905	Blackburn Rovers	A	0–2		
21 October 1905	Sunderland	H	2–0		
28 October 1905	Birmingham	A	1–2		
4 November 1905	Everton	H	1–2		
11 November 1905	Derby County	A	1–5		
18 November 1905	The Wednesday	H	0–2		
25 November 1905	Nottingham Forest	A	1–3		
2 December 1905	Manchester City	H	2–0		
9 December 1905	Bury	A	0–2		
16 December 1905	Middlesbrough	H	2–2		
23 December 1905	Preston North End	A	2–2		
25 December 1905	Newcastle United	H	4–3		
27 December 1905	Aston Villa	A	1–2		
30 December 1905	Liverpool	A	0–3		
1 January 1906	Bolton Wanderers	A	1–6		
6 January 1906	Sheffield United	H	5–1		
20 January 1906	Notts County	A	0–1		
27 January 1906	Stoke	H	1–2		
10 February 1906	Wolverhampton Wanderers	H	2–1		
17 February 1906	Blackburn Rovers	H	3–2		
3 March 1906	Birmingham	H	5–0		
17 March 1906	Derby County	H	1–0		
21 March 1906	Everton	A	1–0		
24 March 1906	The Wednesday	A	2–4		
2 April 1906	Nottingham Forest	H	3–1		
7 April 1906	Manchester City	A	2–1		
13 April 1906	Aston Villa	H	2–1		
14 April 1906	Bury	H	4–0		
16 April 1906	Newcastle United	A	1–1		
21 April 1906	Middlesbrough	A	0–2		
25 April 1906	Sunderland	A	2–2		

==== Final League table ====
Pos	Team	Pld	W	D	L	GF	GA	GAv	Pts	Relegation
1	Liverpool (C)	38	23	5	10	79	46	1.717	51	
2	Preston North End	38	17	13	8	54	39	1.385	47	
3	The Wednesday	38	18	8	12	63	52	1.212	44	
4	Newcastle United	38	18	7	13	74	48	1.542	43	
5	Manchester City	38	19	5	14	73	54	1.352	43	
6	Bolton Wanderers	38	17	7	14	81	67	1.209	41	
7	Birmingham	38	17	7	14	65	59	1.102	41	
8	Aston Villa	38	17	6	15	72	56	1.286	40	
9	Blackburn Rovers	38	16	8	14	54	52	1.038	40	
10	Stoke	38	16	7	15	54	55	0.982	39	
11	Everton	38	15	7	16	70	66	1.061	37	
12	Woolwich Arsenal	38	15	7	16	62	64	0.969	37	
13	Sheffield United	38	15	6	17	57	62	0.919	36	
14	Sunderland	38	15	5	18	61	70	0.871	35	
15	Derby County	38	14	7	17	39	58	0.672	35	
16	Notts County	38	11	12	15	55	71	0.775	34	
17	Bury	38	11	10	17	57	74	0.770	32	
18	Middlesbrough	38	10	11	17	56	71	0.789	31	
19	Nottingham Forest (R)	38	13	5	20	58	79	0.734	31	Relegation to the Second Division
20	Wolverhampton Wanderers (R)	38	8	7	23	58	99	0.586	23	Relegation to the Second Division

Source: World Football
Rules for classification: 1) Points; 2) Goal average; 3) Goals scored
(C) Champions; (R) Relegated

=== FA Cup ===
Round	Date	Opponent	Venue	Result	Attendance	Goalscorers
R1	13 January 1906	West Ham United	H	1–1		
R1 R	18 January 1906	West Ham United	A	3–2		
R2	3 February 1906	Walford	H	3–0		
R3	24 February 1906	Sunderland	H	5–0		
R4	10 March 1906	Manchester United	A	3–2		
SF	31 March 1906	Newcastle United	N	0–2		
