= 1908–09 Woolwich Arsenal F.C. season =

English football club season

Woolwich Arsenal
1908–09 season
- Chairman: George Leavey
- Manager: George Morrell
- Stadium: Manor Ground
- First Division: 6th
- FA Cup: 2nd Round

In the 1908–09 season, the Woolwich Arsenal F.C. played 38 games, won 14, draw 10 and lost 14. The team finished 6th in the league.

== Results ==
Arsenal's score comes first

Win	Draw	Loss

=== Football League First Division ===
Date	Opponent	Venue	Result	Attendance	Scorers
2 September 1908	Everton	H	0–4		
5 September 1908	Notts County	A	1–2		
7 September 1908	Everton	A	3–0		
12 September 1908	Newcastle United	H	1–2		
19 September 1908	Bristol City	A	1–2		
26 September 1908	Preston North End	H	1–0		
3 October 1908	Middlesbrough	A	1–1		
10 October 1908	Manchester City	H	3–0		
17 October 1908	Liverpool	A	2–2		
24 October 1908	Bury	H	4–0		
31 October 1908	Sheffield United	A	1–1		
7 November 1908	Aston Villa	H	0–1		
14 November 1908	Nottingham Forest	A	1–0		
21 November 1908	Sunderland	H	0–4		
28 November 1908	Chelsea	A	2–1		
5 December 1908	Blackburn Rovers	H	0–1		
12 December 1908	Bradford City	A	1–4		
19 December 1908	Manchester United	H	0–1		
25 December 1908	Leicester Fosse	A	1–1		
26 December 1908	Leicester Fosse	H	2–1		
28 December 1908	The Wednesday	A	2–6		
2 January 1909	Notts County	H	1–0		
9 January 1909	Newcastle United	A	1–3		
23 January 1909	Bristol City	H	1–1		
30 January 1909	Preston North End	A	0–0		
13 February 1909	Manchester City	A	2–2		
20 February 1909	Liverpool	H	5–0		
27 February 1909	Bury	A	1–1		
13 March 1909	Aston Villa	A	1–2		
17 March 1909	Middlesbrough	H	1–1		
20 March 1909	Nottingham Forest	H	1–2		
27 March 1909	Sunderland	A	0–1		
1 April 1909	Sheffield United	H	1–0		
3 April 1909	Chelsea	H	0–0		
10 April 1909	Blackburn Rovers	A	3–1		
12 April 1909	The Wednesday	H	2–0		
17 April 1909	Bradford City	A	4–1		
27 April 1909	Manchester United	A	4–1		

==== Final League table ====
Pos	Team	Pld	W	D	L	GF	GA	GAv	Pts	Relegation
1	Newcastle United (C)	38	24	5	9	65	41	1.585	53	
2	Everton	38	18	10	10	82	57	1.439	46	
3	Sunderland	38	21	2	15	78	63	1.238	44	
4	Blackburn Rovers	38	14	13	11	61	50	1.220	41	
5	The Wednesday	38	17	6	15	67	61	1.098	40	
6	Woolwich Arsenal	38	14	10	14	52	49	1.061	38	
7	Aston Villa	38	14	10	14	58	56	1.036	38	
8	Bristol City	38	13	12	13	45	58	0.776	38	
9	Middlesbrough	38	14	9	15	59	53	1.113	37	
10	Preston North End	38	13	11	14	48	44	1.091	37	
11	Chelsea	38	14	9	15	56	61	0.918	37	
12	Sheffield United	38	14	9	15	51	59	0.864	37	
13	Manchester United	38	15	7	16	58	68	0.853	37	
14	Nottingham Forest	38	14	8	16	66	57	1.158	36	
15	Notts County	38	14	8	16	51	48	1.063	36	
16	Liverpool	38	15	6	17	57	65	0.877	36	
17	Bury	38	14	8	16	63	77	0.818	36	
18	Bradford City	38	12	10	16	47	47	1.000	34	
19	Manchester City (R)	38	15	4	19	67	69	0.971	34	Relegation to the Second Division
20	Leicester Fosse (R)	38	8	9	21	54	102	0.529	25	Relegation to the Second Division

Source: World Football
Rules for classification: 1) Points; 2) Goal average; 3) Goals scored
(C) Champions; (R) Relegated

=== FA Cup ===
Round	Date	Opponent	Venue	Result	Attendance	Goalscorers
R1	16 January 1909	Croydon Common	A	1–1		
R1 R	20 January 1909	Croydon Common	H	2–0		
R2	6 February 1909	Millwall Athletic	H	1–1		
R2 R	10 February 1909	Millwall Athletic	A	0–1		
