= 1904–05 Woolwich Arsenal F.C. season =

English football club season

Woolwich Arsenal
1904–05 season
- Chairman: George Leavey
- Manager: Phil Kelso
- Stadium: Manor Ground
- First Division: 10th
- FA Cup: First Round

Arsenal Football Club is a professional football club based in Islington, London, England. Arsenal plays in the Premier League, the top flight of English football. The club has won 14 league titles (including one unbeaten title), a record 14 FA Cups, two League Cups, 16 FA Community Shields, the League Centenary Trophy, one European Cup Winners' Cup, and one Inter-Cities Fairs Cup.

The 1904-05 season was Arsenal (under the name Woolwich Arsenal)'s first season in the top flight of English football; this marked the first appearance of a team from southern England.

== Results ==
Arsenal's score comes first

Win	Draw	Loss

=== Football League First Division ===
Date	Opponent	Venue	Result	Attendance	Scorers
3 September 1904	Newcastle United	A	0–3		
10 September 1904	Preston North End	H	0–0		
17 September 1904	Middlesbrough	A	0–1		
24 September 1904	Wolverhampton Wanderers	H	2–0		
1 October 1904	Bury	A	1–1		
8 October 1904	Aston Villa	H	1–0		
15 October 1904	Blackburn Rovers	A	1–1		
22 October 1904	Nottingham Forest	H	0–3		
29 October 1904	Sheffield Wednesday	A	3–0		
5 November 1904	Sunderland	H	0–0		
12 November 1904	Stoke	H	2–1		
19 November 1904	Derby County	A	0–0		
3 December 1904	Small Heath	A	1–2		
10 December 1904	Manchester City	H	1–0		
17 December 1904	Notts County	A	5–1		
24 December 1904	Sheffield United	H	1–0		
26 December 1904	Aston Villa	A	1–3		
27 December 1904	Nottingham Forest	A	3–0		
28 December 1904	Sheffield United	A	0–4		
31 December 1904	Newcastle United	H	0–2		
7 January 1905	Preston North End	A	0–3		
14 January 1905	Middlesbrough	H	1–1		
21 January 1905	Wolverhampton Wanderers	A	1–4		
28 January 1905	Bury	H	2–1		
11 February 1905	Blackburn Rovers	H	2–0		
25 February 1905	Sheffield Wednesday	H	3–0		
4 March 1905	Sunderland	A	1–1		
11 March 1905	Stoke City	A	0–2		
18 March 1905	Derby County	H	0–0		
1 April 1905	Small Heath	H	1–1		
5 April 1905	Everton	A	0–1		
8 April 1905	Manchester City	A	0–1		
15 April 1905	Notts County	H	1–2		
22 April 1905	Everton	H	2–1		

==== Final League table ====
Pos	Team	Pld	W	D	L	GF	GA	GAv	Pts
1	Newcastle United (C)	34	23	2	9	72	33	2.182	48
2	Everton	34	21	5	8	63	36	1.750	47
3	Manchester City	34	20	6	8	66	37	1.784	46
4	Aston Villa	34	19	4	11	63	43	1.465	42
5	Sunderland	34	16	8	10	60	44	1.364	40
6	Sheffield United	34	19	2	13	64	56	1.143	40
7	Small Heath	34	17	5	12	54	38	1.421	39
8	Preston North End	34	13	10	11	42	37	1.135	36
9	The Wednesday	34	14	5	15	61	57	1.070	33
10	Woolwich Arsenal	34	12	9	13	36	40	0.900	33
11	Derby County	34	12	8	14	37	48	0.771	32
12	Stoke	34	13	4	17	40	58	0.690	30
13	Blackburn Rovers	34	11	5	18	40	51	0.784	27
14	Wolverhampton Wanderers	34	11	4	19	47	73	0.644	26
15	Middlesbrough	34	9	8	17	36	56	0.643	26
16	Nottingham Forest	34	9	7	18	40	61	0.656	25
17	Bury	34	10	4	20	47	67	0.701	24
18	Notts County	34	5	8	21	36	69	0.522	18

Source: World Football
Rules for classification: 1) Points; 2) Goal average; 3) Goals scored
(C) Champions

=== FA Cup ===
Round	Date	Opponent	Venue	Result	Attendance	Goalscorers
R1	4 February 1905	Bristol City	H	0–0		
R1 R	8 February 1905	Bristol City	A	0–1		
