= 1887–88 Royal Arsenal F.C. season =

English football club season

Royal Arsenal
1887–88 season
- Chairman: None
- Manager: None
- None: None
- None: None
- Top goalscorer: League: N/A; All: JA. Morris (6)
- Highest home attendance: 600 vs Grove House (8 October 1887); 600 vs Millwall Rovers (30 March 1888)
- Lowest home attendance: 300 vs Alexandra United (1 October 1887)
Home colours

This was the second season of the club that was to become Arsenal F.C. In this season they moved from the common of Plumstead Ground to the privately owned Sportsman Ground, in order to charge an entrance fee to view games. The nearby Sportsman Pub was used as a dressing room. This season was notable for their inaugural participation in the London Senior Cup, and home and away games against enduring rivals, Tottenham Hotspur.

== Players ==
Below is a list of all Arsenal Players reported to play for them that season, and all confirmed appearances and goals. Out of the 24 games played that season, confirmed line-ups were recovered for 12 of these games, and goalscorers for 11. Players who predominantly played as goalkeepers are marked in Italics.

| | Friendlies | | LSC | | Total | |
| Player | App | Goals | App | Goals | | |
|---|---|---|---|---|---|---|
| B. Banks | 1 | 0 | 1 | 0 | 2 | 0 |
| CW. Bates | 0 | 0 | 1 | 0 | 1 | 0 |
| FW. Beardsley | 8 | 0 | 1 | 0 | 9 | 0 |
| J. Bee | 6 | 1 | 1 | 0 | 7 | 1 |
| A. Brown | 8 | 3 | 1 | 0 | 9 | 3 |
| P. Connolly | 4 | 4 | 0 | 0 | 4 | 4 |
| JB. Crichton | 9 | 3 | 1 | 0 | 10 | 3 |
| R. Crichton | 2 | 0 | 0 | 0 | 2 | 0 |
| D. Danskin (C) | 11 | 0 | 1 | 0 | 12 | 0 |
| E. Hartland | 6 | 1 | 0 | 0 | 6 | 1 |
| JG. Hill | 4 | 0 | 0 | 0 | 4 | 0 |
| FB. Hills | 5 | 1 | 0 | 0 | 5 | 1 |
| JW. Humble | 8 | 0 | 0 | 0 | 8 | 0 |
| WW. Levy | 1 | 0 | 0 | 0 | 1 | 0 |
| J. Lucas | 1 | 0 | 0 | 0 | 1 | 0 |
| W. Lucas | 3 | 0 | 0 | 0 | 3 | 0 |
| JA. Morris | 9 | 6 | 1 | 0 | 10 | 6 |
| J. Moy | 2 | 0 | 0 | 0 | 2 | 0 |
| J. Ogilvie | 1 | 0 | 0 | 0 | 1 | 0 |
| J. Potter | 2 | 1 | 0 | 0 | 2 | 1 |
| R. Price | 6 | 0 | 1 | 0 | 7 | 0 |
| S. Ridgwell | 3 | 0 | 1 | 0 | 4 | 0 |
| J. Ronald | 2 | 1 | 0 | 0 | 2 | 1 |
| J. Rowland | 1 | 0 | 0 | 0 | 1 | 0 |
| G. Smith | 2 | 0 | 0 | 0 | 2 | 0 |
| T. Wells | 11 | 1 | 1 | 0 | 12 | 0 |
| HB. Weeks | 4 | 1 | 0 | 0 | 4 | 1 |

=== Management ===
There was no manager for the 1887-88 season, though Fred Beardsley, Arthur Brown (both players) and Duncan Porteous were positioned as joint-secretaries amongst others, after Elijah Watkins left the position of secretary at the beginning of the season.

== Pre-season ==
=== Friendlies ===
| 1 October 1887 | Royal Arsenal | 5–1 | Alexandra United |
| | | | | Attendance: 300 |

| 8 October 1887 | Royal Arsenal | 3–1 | Grove House |
| | Potter (?); Crichton (?); Morris (?) | | | Attendance: 600 |
Note: This game was scheduled as a London Senior Cup match. However, the game was scratched and was played as a friendly.

| 15 October 1887 | Royal Arsenal | 2–2 | Clapham Pilgrims |
| | Morris (?); Crichton (?) |

| 22 October 1887 | Royal Arsenal | Unknown | St Luke's |
| | Bee (?); Ronald (?); Morris (?) |

| 5 November 1887 | Royal Arsenal | 4–0 | Grange Institute |
| | Bee (?); Ronald (?); Morris (?) |

| 12 November 1887 | Royal Arsenal | 1–1 | Iona Deptford |
| | Crichton (?) |

| 19 November 1887 | Tottenham Hotspur | 1–2 | Royal Arsenal |

| 26 November 1887 | Millwall Rovers | 0–3 | Royal Arsenal |

| 3 December 1887 | Royal Arsenal | Unknown | Grange Park |

| 10 December 1887 | Royal Arsenal | 1–2 | Brixton Rangers |

| 17 December 1887 | Shrewsbury Park | 4–0 | Royal Arsenal |

| 31 December 1887 | Forest Gate Alliance | 1–2 | Royal Arsenal |

| 14 January 1888 | Iona Deptford | 3–2 | Royal Arsenal |

| 28 January 1888 | Royal Arsenal | 6–0 | Champion Hill |

| 4 February 1888 | Royal Arsenal | 6–2 | Tottenham Hotspur |

| 11 February 1888 | Royal Arsenal | 3–3 | Millwall Rovers |

| 18 February 1888 | Royal Arsenal | 2–1 | Erith |
| | Crichton (?); Hill (?) |

| 25 February 1888 | Royal Arsenal | 1–1 | Forest Gate Alliance |

| 3 March 1888 | Royal Arsenal | 2–1 | Grange Institute |
| | Brown (?) |

| 10 March 1888 | Brixton Rangers | 9–3 | Royal Arsenal |

| 17 March 1888 | Royal Arsenal | 5–0 | Ascham |

| 30 March 1888 | Royal Arsenal | 3–0 | Millwall Rovers |
| | Morris (?); Brown (?) |

| 7 April 1888 | Alexandra United | 0–3 | Royal Arsenal |
| | | | Wells (?); Hartland (?); Weeks (?) |

== Competitions ==
=== Overview ===
| Competition | Record | | | | | | | |
| Competition | P | W | D | L | GF | GA | GD | Win % |
|---|---|---|---|---|---|---|---|---|
| London Senior Cup | 1 | 0 | 0 | 1 | 0 | 4 | −4 | 0.00 |
| Total | 1 | 0 | 0 | 1 | 0 | 4 | −4 | 0.00 |

Updated to match played 29 October 1887
Source: Competitions

=== London Senior Cup ===
| 29 December 1887 2 | Royal Arsenal | 0–4 | Barnes |
| | | | | Attendance: 500 |
