= 1909–10 Woolwich Arsenal F.C. season =

English football club season

Woolwich Arsenal
1909–10 season
- Chairman: George Leavey
- Manager: George Morrell
- Stadium: Manor Ground
- First Division: 18th
- FA Cup: 2nd Round

In the 1909–10 season, the Woolwich Arsenal F.C. played 38 games, won 11, draw 9 and lost 18. The team finished 18th in the league. They were one rank above being relegated back to the Second Division.

== Results ==
Arsenal's score comes first

Win	Draw	Loss

=== Football League First Division ===
Date	Opponent	Venue	Result	Attendance	Scorers
1 September 1909	Aston Villa	A	1–5		
4 September 1909	Sheffield United	H	0–0		
11 September 1909	Middlesbrough	A	2–5		
18 September 1909	Bolton Wanderers	A	0–3		
25 September 1909	Chelsea	H	3–2		
2 October 1909	Blackburn Rovers	A	0–7		
7 October 1909	Notts County	A	1–5		
9 October 1909	Nottingham Forest	H	0–1		
16 October 1909	Sunderland	A	2–6		
23 October 1909	Everton	H	1–0		
30 October 1909	Manchester United	A	0–1		
6 November 1909	Bradford City	H	0–1		
13 November 1909	The Wednesday	A	1–1		
20 November 1909	Bristol City	H	2–2		
27 November 1909	Bury	A	2–1		
4 December 1909	Tottenham Hotspur	H	1–0		
11 December 1909	Preston North End	A	4–3		
18 December 1909	Notts County	H	1–2		
25 December 1909	Newcastle United	H	0–3		
27 December 1909	Liverpool	H	1–1		
1 January 1910	Liverpool	A	1–5		
8 January 1910	Sheffield United	A	0–2		
22 January 1910	Middlesbrough	H	3–0		
29 January 1910	Bolton Wanderers	H	2–0		
12 February 1910	Blackburn Rovers	H	0–1		
26 February 1910	Sunderland	H	1–2		
2 March 1910	Nottingham Forest	A	1–1		
7 March 1910	Everton	A	0–1		
12 March 1910	Manchester United	H	0–0		
19 March 1910	Bradford City	A	1–0		
25 March 1910	Newcastle United	A	1–1		
26 March 1910	The Wednesday	H	0–1		
28 March 1910	Chelsea	A	1–0		
2 April 1910	Bristol City	A	1–0		
9 April 1910	Bury	H	0–0		
11 April 1910	Aston Villa	H	1–0		
16 April 1910	Tottenham Hotspur	A	1–1		
23 April 1910	Preston North End	H	1–3		

==== Final League table ====
Pos	Team	Pld	W	D	L	GF	GA	GAv	Pts	Relegation
1	Aston Villa (C)	38	23	7	8	84	42	2.000	53	
2	Liverpool	38	21	6	11	78	57	1.368	48	
3	Blackburn Rovers	38	18	9	11	73	55	1.327	45	
4	Newcastle United	38	19	7	12	70	56	1.250	45	
5	Manchester United	38	19	7	12	69	61	1.131	45	
6	Sheffield United	38	16	10	12	62	41	1.512	42	
7	Bradford City	38	17	8	13	64	47	1.362	42	
8	Sunderland	38	18	5	15	66	51	1.294	41	
9	Notts County	38	15	10	13	67	59	1.136	40	
10	Everton	38	16	8	14	51	56	0.911	40	
11	The Wednesday	38	15	9	14	60	63	0.952	39	
12	Preston North End	38	15	5	18	52	58	0.897	35	
13	Bury	38	12	9	17	62	66	0.939	33	
14	Nottingham Forest	38	11	11	16	54	72	0.750	33	
15	Tottenham Hotspur	38	11	10	17	53	69	0.768	32	
16	Bristol City	38	12	8	18	45	60	0.750	32	
17	Middlesbrough	38	11	9	18	56	73	0.767	31	
18	Woolwich Arsenal	38	11	9	18	37	67	0.552	31	
19	Chelsea (R)	38	11	7	20	47	70	0.671	29	Relegation to the Second Division
20	Bolton Wanderers (R)	38	9	6	23	44	71	0.620	24	Relegation to the Second Division

Source: World Football
Rules for classification: 1) Points; 2) Goal average; 3) Goals scored
(C) Champions; (R) Relegated

=== FA Cup ===
Round	Date	Opponent	Venue	Result	Attendance	Goalscorers
R1	15 January 1910	Watford	H	3–0		
R2	5 February 1910	Everton	A	0–5		
