= 1888–89 Royal Arsenal F.C. season =

English football club season

1888–1889 season
- Chairman: None
- Manager: None
- Stadium: Manor Field
- London Senior Cup: Semi-final
- Kent Senior Cup: Third round
- Top goalscorer: League: Connolly (13); All: Connolly (19)
- Highest home attendance: 2000 vs Clapton F.C. (19 January 1889)
- Lowest home attendance: 500

1888–1889 marked the third season of the club that was to become Arsenal F.C. After the flooding of the Sportsman's Ground, they moved to the nearby Manor Field, using the Lord Derby Pub as a headquarters, and the Railway Tavern as a dressing room. The team competed in the Kent Senior Cup (KSC) for the first time, as well as making their second appearance in the London Senior Cup, reaching the semi-finals of the latter competition. David Danskin continued as captain throughout the season.

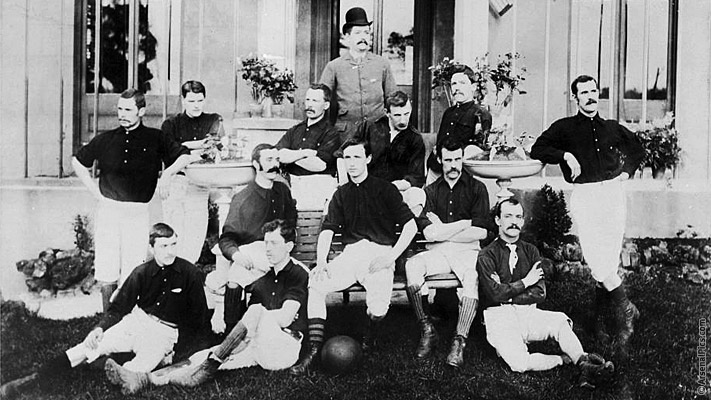
The 1888–1889 Royal Arsenal squad.

== Players ==
Below is a list of all players who made a registered appearance in the 1888–89 season, along with their appearances, and goals scored. Out of 33 games played, 20 complete line-ups were recorded, with partial records for another 8. Bold indicates that a player was making his debut for Royal Arsenal F.C. that season. Goalkeepers are marked in Italics.

| | Friendlies | | LSC | | KSC | | Total | |
| Player | App | Goals | App | Goals | App | Goals | App | Goals |
|---|---|---|---|---|---|---|---|---|
| **E. Agnew** | 1 | 0 | 0 | 0 | 0 | 0 | 1 | 0 |
| **A. Bannister** | 2 | 0 | 0 | 0 | 0 | 0 | 2 | 0 |
| **H. Barbour** | 5 | 4 | 0 | 0 | 0 | 0 | 5 | 4 |
| **JM. Bates** | 16 | 1 | 4 | 0 | 3 | 1 | 23 | 2 |
| FW. Beardsley | 10 | 0 | 4 | 0 | 3 | 0 | 17 | 0 |
| A. Brown | 13 | 0 | 4 | 0 | 3 | 0 | 20 | 0 |
| **Carter** | 1 | 0 | 0 | 0 | 0 | 0 | 1 | 0 |
| **JM. Charteris** | 10 | 6 | 4 | 1 | 2 | 3 | 16 | 10 |
| Peter Connolly | 13 | 6 | 4 | 7 | 3 | 6 | 20 | 19 |
| JB. Crichton | 1 | 0 | 4 | 0 | 1 | 0 | 6 | 0 |
| R. Crichton | 1 | 0 | 2 | 1 | 1 | 1 | 4 | 2 |
| **Cross** | 1 | 2 | 0 | 0 | 0 | 0 | 1 | 2 |
| D. Danskin (C) | 8 | 0 | 4 | 0 | 2 | 0 | 14 | 0 |
| E. Hartland | 5 | 0 | 0 | 0 | 1 | 0 | 6 | 0 |
| JG. Hill | 3 | 0 | 2 | 0 | 1 | 0 | 6 | 0 |
| **RT. Horsington** | 9 | 0 | 0 | 0 | 1 | 0 | 10 | 0 |
| **D. Howat** | 6 | 0 | 0 | 0 | 0 | 0 | 6 | 0 |
| JW. Humble | 1 | 0 | 0 | 0 | 0 | 0 | 1 | 0 |
| **G. Kennedy** | 1 | 0 | 0 | 0 | 0 | 0 | 1 | 0 |
| **JD. McBean** | 11 | 0 | 1 | 0 | 1 | 0 | 13 | 0 |
| **JW. Meggs** | 3 | 2 | 0 | 0 | 0 | 0 | 3 | 2 |
| JA. Morris | 6 | 0 | 4 | 0 | 2 | 1 | 12 | 1 |
| J. Rowland | 2 | 0 | 0 | 0 | 0 | 0 | 2 | 0 |
| **W. Russell** | 1 | 0 | 0 | 0 | 0 | 0 | 1 | 0 |
| **J. Saul** | 1 | 1 | 0 | 0 | 1 | 0 | 2 | 1 |
| **WW. Scott** | 13 | 3 | 4 | 1 | 3 | 1 | 20 | 5 |
| **J. Tomes** | 3 | 1 | 0 | 0 | 0 | 0 | 3 | 1 |
| **A. Walton** | 3 | 0 | 0 | 0 | 0 | 0 | 3 | 0 |
| HB. Weeks | 3 | 0 | 0 | 0 | 0 | 0 | 3 | 0 |
| T. Wells | 5 | 0 | 3 | 0 | 2 | 1 | 10 | 1 |
| **J. Wilkinson** | 1 | 0 | 0 | 0 | 0 | 0 | 1 | 0 |
| **J. Wilson** | 8 | 0 | 0 | 0 | 1 | 0 | 9 | 0 |

== Matches ==
A total of 34 games were played over the season, of which 7 were competitive cup fixtures, with the other 26 being friendlies. Over the course of the season, the Royal Arsenal recorded 17 Wins, 6 Draws and 10 losses, with 1 result unrecorded.

| Date | Opponents | Ground | Competition | Score | Attendance |
|---|---|---|---|---|---|
| 15 September 1888 | London Caledonians F.C. | H | | 3–3 | |
| 22 September 1888 | Tottenham Hotspur F.C. | H | | 0–1 | 500 |
| 29 September 1888 | Old St. Paul's | H | | 7–3 | 500 |
| 6 October 1888 | Grove House | H | | 2–0 | |
| 13 October 1888 | London Caledonians | H | | 4–0 | 700 |
| 20 October 1888 | 2nd Rifle Brigade | H | | 1–2 | |
| 27 October 1888 | Brixton Rangers | A | | 1–3 | |
| 3 November 1888 | Phoenix | H | LSC | 3–0 | 500 |
| 10 November 1888 | Horton Kirby | A | KSC | 6–2 | |
| 17 November 1888 | St. Lukes | A | | 1–1 | |
| 24 November 1888 | Dulwich | H | LSC | 4–2 | 1000 |
| 1 December 1888 | Phoenix | A | | 0–0 | |
| 8 December 1888 | Old St. Paul's | H | LSC | 3–1 | 1200 |
| 29 December 1888 | Iona | A | KSC | 5–1 | |
| 5 January 1889 | Vulcan | A | | 1–1 | |
| 12 January 1889 | Unity | H | | 0–0 | |
| 19 January 1889 | Clapton F.C. | N | LSC | 0–2 | 2000 |
| 26 January 1889 | St. Lukes | A | | | |
| 2 February 1889 | Ilford F.C. | H | | 1–2 | 500 |
| 9 February 1889 | Gravesend | A | KSC | 3–3 | 1000 |
| 16 February 1889 | Millwall Rovers | H | | W | |
| 23 February 1889 | Ilford F.C. | A | | 0–1 | |
| 2 March 1889 | London Caledonians | H | | 1–2 | 1500 |
| 9 March 1889 | Tottenham Hotspur | A | | 1–0 | |
| 16 March 1889 | South Eastern Rangers | H | | 1–2 | 500 |
| 23 March 1889 | 2nd Rifle Brigade | H | | 2–0 | |
| 30 March 1889 | Royal Artillery | H | | 9–0 | |
| 1 April 1889 | 2nd Rifle Brigade | | | 6–1 | |
| 6 April 1889 | Old St. Paul's | A | | 1–0 | |
| 13 April 1889 | Millwall F.C. | H | | 3–0 | |
| 19 April 1889 | Boston Town | A | | 1–4 | 1200 |
| 20 April 1889 | Spartan Rovers | H | | 6–0 | |
| 22 April 1889 | Scots Guards | H | | 7–2 | |
| 29 April 1889 | London Caledonians | H | | 0–1 | 1300 |
