= 1895–96 Woolwich Arsenal F.C. season =

English football club season

Woolwich Arsenal
1895–96 season
- Stadium: Manor Ground
- Second Division: 7th
- FA Cup: First Round

In the 1895–96 season, the Woolwich Arsenal F.C. played 30 games, won 14, drawn 4 and lost 12. The team finished 7th in the season.

== Results ==
Win	Draw	Loss

=== Football League Second Division ===
==== Final League table ====
Pos	Team	Pld	W	D	L	GF	GA	GAv	Pts
5	Newcastle United	30	16	2	12	73	50	1.460	34
6	Newton Heath	30	15	3	12	66	57	1.158	33
7	Woolwich Arsenal	30	14	4	12	58	42	1.381	32
8	Leicester Fosse	30	14	4	12	57	44	1.295	32
9	Darwen	30	12	6	12	72	67	1.075	30

Rules for classification: 1) Points; 2) Goal average; 3) Goals scored
