= History of Arsenal F.C. (1886–1966) =

History of an English football club

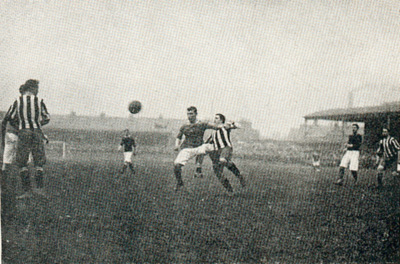
Woolwich Arsenal (in dark shirts) playing Newcastle United (in striped shirts) in an FA Cup semi-final at the Victoria Ground, Stoke on 31 March 1906

The history of Arsenal Football Club between 1886 and 1966 covers the time from the club's foundation, through the first two major periods of success (the 1930s, and the late 1940s and early 1950s, respectively) and the club's subsequent decline in the early 1960s.

Arsenal Football Club was founded in 1886 as a munition workers' team from Woolwich, then in Kent. They turned professional in 1891 and joined The Football League two years later. They were promoted to the First Division in 1904 but in 1910 the club went into voluntary liquidation due to financial problems and were bought out by a consortium of businessmen. New majority shareholder Sir Henry Norris improved the club's financial standing and moved the team to Arsenal Stadium, Highbury, north London in 1913. In 1919, after the First World War, the club was voted into the newly expanded First Division, where they have remained ever since.

It was not until the appointment of Herbert Chapman as manager in 1925 that Arsenal had their first period of major success. Chapman modernised and reformed the club's practices and tactics, and under him and his successor George Allison (who took over after Chapman's death in January 1934), Arsenal won five First Division titles and two FA Cups in the 1930s. After the Second World War, Tom Whittaker continued the success, leading the club to two First Division titles and an FA Cup. After Whittaker's death Arsenal's fortunes gradually declined; by 1966, they were consistently finishing around the middle of the league table and had not won a trophy in thirteen years. This led to the dismissal of Billy Wright as manager in 1966, and the appointment of Bertie Mee.

== Early years (1886–1910) ==
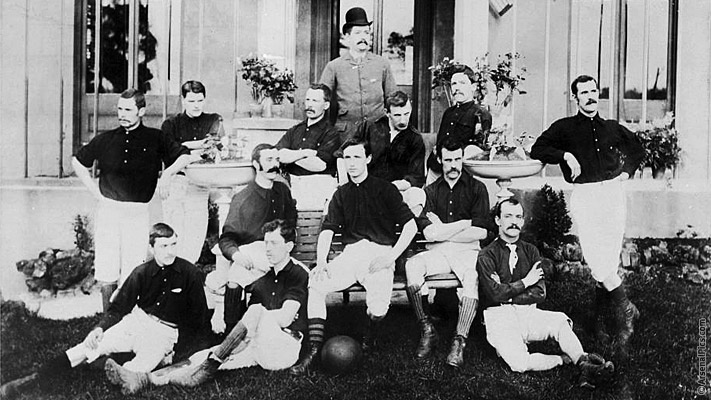
Royal Arsenal's squad of the 1888–89 season

The club was founded as Dial Square Football Club in 1886 by a group of workers employed by the Dial Square workshop at the Royal Arsenal, an armaments factory in Woolwich, which was then in Kent but was incorporated into London in 1889. (Note: Another football team based at the Royal Arsenal, Woolwich Union, had been founded in 1884, and some Dial Square players, including Fred Beardsley, had previously played for that side. However, club historians generally regard Dial Square as Arsenal's direct forerunners.) They were led by a Scotsman, David Danskin, who purchased the club's first football, Jack Humble and, later, former Nottingham Forest goalkeeper Fred Beardsley. (Note: Contrary to popular belief, Beardsley and Nottingham Forest did not provide the original red shirts worn by the players. Beardsley suggested that they play in the same colours as Forest, the shirts were purchased locally.) Dial Square played their first match on 11 December 1886 against Eastern Wanderers on an open field on the Isle of Dogs, which they won 6–0. (Note: The number of goals Dial Square scored is disputed, though six is the officially recorded figure.) The club was renamed Royal Arsenal soon afterwards, reportedly on Christmas Day. Initially the club played on Plumstead Common, but soon sought alternative homes, firstly the Sportsman Ground in Plumstead before moving to the adjacent Manor Ground in 1888. Unhappy with the Manor Ground's poor facilities, the club moved to the nearby Invicta Ground in 1890, before returning to the Manor Ground three years later as the Invicta Ground's rent proved too expensive.

During this period, Royal Arsenal were successful in various local trophies, winning both the Kent Senior Cup and London Charity Cup in the 1889–90 season and the London Senior Cup in 1890–91; they also entered the FA Cup for the first time in 1889–90. A gulf between Arsenal and the professional sides from Northern England soon became apparent, and Arsenal faced the threat of their amateur players being lured away by the money which professional sides could offer; after Derby County had played Arsenal in an FA Cup tie in 1891, they attempted to sign two of Arsenal's amateur players on professional contracts. Royal Arsenal's move to professionalism in 1891 was frowned upon by many of the amateur southern clubs, and they were banned from participating in local competitions by the London Football Association. With friendlies and the FA Cup the only matches available for Royal Arsenal, they attempted to set up a southern equivalent of The Football League, but the move failed. The club changed its name to Woolwich Arsenal in 1893 when it formed a limited liability company. The club was invited to join the Football League in 1893, initially in the Second Division, becoming the first Southern club to enter the League. In response, some of the club's amateur players who rejected professionalism and wanted a workers' team to represent just the Royal Arsenal, broke away to form a short-lived alternative side, Royal Ordnance Factories. Tragedy struck on November 23, 1896, when Arsenal player and first-ever captain Joe Powell died aged 23 of tetanus, having broken his arm tackling a Kettering player. Woolwich Arsenal played in the Second Division for eleven seasons, and generally occupied mid-table positions before the appointment of Harry Bradshaw as manager in 1899; Bradshaw and his signings, including goalkeeper Jimmy Ashcroft (Arsenal's first England international) and captain Jimmy Jackson, won promotion to the First Division in the 1903–04 season. Bradshaw moved on to Fulham in May 1904, before Arsenal had kicked a ball in the top flight. Despite some strong performances in the FA Cup – the club reached the semi-finals in 1905–06 and 1906–07 – Arsenal were unable to challenge for the League title, only twice finishing above tenth place in the First Division between 1904 and 1913. One cause of this decline was the club's ongoing financial problems; despite the boom in football during the early 20th century, the club's geographic isolation, in the relatively underpopulated area of Plumstead (then on the outskirts of urban London), meant that attendances and thus income were low. To stay afloat, Woolwich Arsenal were forced to sell their star players (including Ashcroft, as well as Tim Coleman and Bert Freeman), and slowly started to slip down the table, which compounded their financial situation as crowds fell. By the end of the decade the average attendance at Manor Ground was 11,000, a little over half of what it had been in 1904. The club was close to bankruptcy, and in 1910 went into voluntary liquidation before being bought out by a consortium of businessmen; the largest shareholder amongst the new owners was the property magnate Sir Henry Norris, who was also the chairman of Fulham.

== Move to Highbury and the promotion controversy (1910–1925) ==
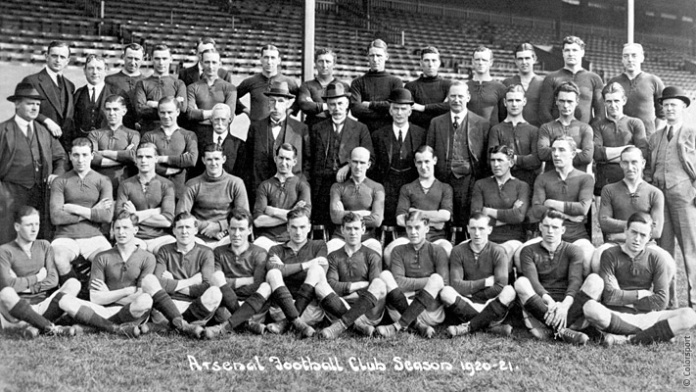
Arsenal's squad for the 1920–21 season, the club's best under Leslie Knighton, finishing ninth in the First Division

Norris was acutely aware of the problems associated with Woolwich Arsenal's location, and was desperate to improve the club's income. First, he tried to merge Woolwich Arsenal with his other club, Fulham. When that was blocked by the Football League, Norris abandoned the merger and looked to move the club elsewhere, eventually picking a site in Highbury, north London. Despite objections both from Woolwich-based fans and residents of Highbury, Norris saw the move through, reportedly spending £125,000 (equivalent to £12,470,450 in 2025) on building the new stadium, designed by Archibald Leitch, on a divinity college's playing fields. Woolwich Arsenal moved there in the 1913 close season, having finished bottom and been relegated to the Second Division in the 1912–13 season. The club replaced the "Woolwich" in its name with "The" in April 1914, finally becoming plain "Arsenal" in November 1919, although the press at the time continued to refer to them as "The Arsenal" and some still do. The move to Highbury brought about much larger crowds; the average attendance in Arsenal's first season at the new ground was 23,000 (compared to 11,000 at the Manor Ground) and rose further after promotion in 1919, finally warding off the spectre of financial ruin.

The club controversially rejoined the First Division in 1919, despite having only finished sixth in 1914–15, the last season of competitive football before the First World War — although an error in the calculation of goal average meant Arsenal had actually finished fifth, an error which was corrected by the Football League in 1975. The First Division was being expanded from 20 teams to 22, and the two new entrants were to be elected at an AGM of the Football League. On past precedent the two places would be given to the two clubs that would otherwise have been relegated, namely Chelsea and Tottenham Hotspur. Instead one of the extra places was awarded to Chelsea and a ballot was called for the remaining place. The candidates included 20th-placed Tottenham and, from the Second Division, Barnsley (who had finished third); Wolverhampton Wanderers, (fourth); Birmingham (fifth, later amended to sixth); Arsenal; Hull City (seventh); and Nottingham Forest (eighteenth). The League voted to promote sixth-placed Arsenal, for reasons of history over merit; Norris argued that Arsenal be promoted for their "long service to league football", having been the first League club from the South. The League board agreed; Arsenal received 18 votes, Tottenham 8, Barnsley 5 and Wolves 4, with a further 6 votes shared between the other clubs.

The announcement of the vote reportedly caught all the clubs, except Arsenal, unawares and the affair is a major contributing factor to the rivalry which has fuelled the long-standing enmity between Arsenal and Tottenham. There is also an inconsistency in the argument – if "long service to league football" was the criterion for promoting Arsenal instead of Tottenham then Wolverhampton Wanderers, who finished two points ahead of Arsenal and were founder members of the Football League, would appear to have had a stronger claim. It has been alleged that this was due to backroom deals or even outright bribery by Sir Henry Norris, colluding with his friend John McKenna, the chairman of Liverpool and the Football League, who recommended Arsenal's promotion at the AGM. No conclusive proof of wrongdoing has come to light, though other aspects of Norris's financial dealings unrelated to the promotion controversy have fuelled speculation on the matter; Norris resigned as chairman and left the club in 1929, having been found guilty by the Football Association of financial irregularities; he was found to have misused his expenses account, and to have pocketed the proceeds of the sale of the Arsenal team bus. Regardless of the circumstances of their promotion, Arsenal have remained in the top division since 1919, and as a result hold the English record for the longest unbroken stretch of top-flight football. There appear to be no extant records of the meetings which elected Arsenal to the First Division in 1919, however the book Making the Arsenal proposes a different reason for their election in that year, arguing that match-fixing issues from the final year of football before the war (1914–15) were used by Norris as a weapon in his battle to get Arsenal promoted. He demanded that Liverpool and Manchester United (some of whose players had been found guilty of match fixing) be punished by relegation or expulsion, and threatened to organise a breakaway from the league by Midlands and southern clubs if nothing was done. To placate him the League offered Arsenal a place in the First Division.

The club's return to the First Division was not immediately successful. Under Leslie Knighton, the club never finished higher than ninth, and in the 1923–24 season came close to returning to the Second Division, finishing 19th and only a point clear of the relegation zone. Arsenal did no better the following season, finishing 20th (although the club was a lot safer this time, being seven points clear of the relegation places), which was the last straw for Norris; he fired Knighton in May 1925, and appointed the Huddersfield Town manager Herbert Chapman in his place.

== Chapman era (1925–1934) ==
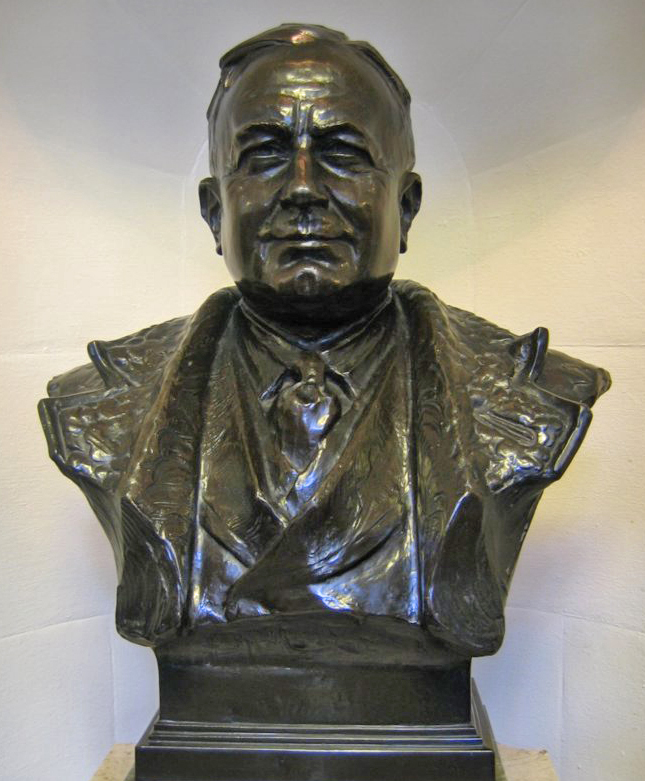
Herbert Chapman's achievements were commemorated by a bronze bust at the club's stadium.

Chapman reformed many of the club's practices, including modernising the training and physiotherapy regimes, adding numbers to the players' shirts in August 1928, and changing the team's colours, adding white sleeves to the red shirt in March 1933. Chapman also insisted on journalists dropping the definite article from the club's name, becoming just "Arsenal", and he successfully campaigned for the renaming of the local Tube station, Gillespie Road, to Arsenal. At the same time, Chapman had a large transfer budget by virtue of Arsenal's improved revenue from their new stadium and a change of heart from Henry Norris; previously a highly prudent chairman, Norris now dictated that there was to be heavy spending on new players. This led to Arsenal becoming known as the "Bank of England club". Chapman's first signing was veteran Charlie Buchan from Sunderland; as well as his contributions on the pitch, Buchan would play an important part of it. After Arsenal were beaten 7–0 by Newcastle United in October 1925, Buchan suggested a change to the formation to adapt to a relaxation of the offside law, adjusting Arsenal's formation to the "WM", strengthening the defence by pushing the centre half back into defence and the full-backs out to the wings. Over time, Chapman developed the formation further, putting an emphasis on a pacey forward line, wingers cutting inside, and the role of a creative ball-playing midfielder.

Arsenal came second in Chapman's first season, their best finish at that time, but for the next few seasons they finished in mid-table as Chapman took his time to assemble his side, slotting new signings such as winger Joe Hulme, forward Jack Lambert and defenders Tom Parker and Herbie Roberts into his new formation. In 1926–27, Arsenal reached their first FA Cup final, only to lose 1–0 to Cardiff City, after Arsenal's goalkeeper Dan Lewis let a harmless-looking shot slip through his arms and into the net; it was the only occasion in history that the FA Cup has been won by a club from outside England. Chapman was not deterred, and continued to build his side, signing future captain Eddie Hapgood, as well as three of the club's great attacking players, David Jack, Alex James and Cliff Bastin; it was especially James, Arsenal's playmaker in midfield, supplying the forward line and wingers, who became celebrated as the engine of the team. Three years after their first Cup final, in 1929–30, Arsenal reached Wembley again, this time up against Chapman's old club Huddersfield Town. The match was notable for being "buzzed" by the enormous German airship Graf Zeppelin. Arsenal were not distracted from their task; they won 2–0 with goals from James and Lambert to bring home the club's first major trophy. Their FA Cup success was the first in a decade in which Arsenal were the dominant club in England. They won the First Division for the first time in 1930–31; Arsenal performed strongly in a free-scoring title race with Aston Villa, recording several heavy wins (including 7–1 against Blackpool, 7–2 against Leicester City, and 9–1 against Grimsby Town. Arsenal finished the season as champions having scored 127 league goals (another club record), though runners-up Villa managed to score 128, a record for the most goals in an English top flight season.

The "Over the Line Final" – Newcastle United's Jimmy Richardson crosses the ball back into the Arsenal penalty area, setting up Jack Allen to score; the ball however was fully over the goal-line at the time and thus out of play. Newcastle went on to win 2–1.

The following season, 1931–32, Arsenal reached the FA Cup final again, losing controversially to Newcastle United. Arsenal had led 1–0 with a Bob John goal, but Newcastle's equaliser came after a long ball had seemingly gone over the goal line, and out for a goal kick. Newcastle winger Jimmy Richardson nevertheless crossed the ball back into play and Jack Allen levelled the match for the Magpies; Allen scored again in the second half to win the match 2–1. Everton had also pipped them to the League title; a poor start to the 1931–32 campaign meant that Arsenal played catch-up for most of the season, finishing two points adrift.

Arsenal bounced back the following season, winning their second League title. Arsenal had started the season weakly, but then went on a long winning run to catch up and then overtake fellow title challengers Aston Villa, whom they beat 5–0 at Highbury in April to clinch the title. By this time Chapman's first set of signings had started to show their age, so with an eye to the future Chapman promoted George Male to the first team to replace Parker, and signed Ray Bowden to take over from Jack. The team did, however, lose to Walsall of the Third Division North in a major upset in the FA Cup; five of the first team were out with injury or flu and had their place taken by reserves, and without them Arsenal lost 2–0 in one of the greatest FA Cup upsets of all time. One of the stand-ins, Tommy Black, was particularly to blame, conceding a penalty for Walsall's second, and was sold by an enraged Chapman to Plymouth Argyle within a week of the result; another, striker Charlie Walsh, was transferred to Brentford a week later.

== Hat-trick of League titles (1934–1939) ==
Arsenal had started the 1933–34 season solidly, but in January 1934 Chapman died suddenly from pneumonia. Despite this, under caretaker manager Joe Shaw Arsenal retained the title that season. Hulme and James were both out with injury for a large portion, and so Arsenal were not the attacking side they had been the previous season, scoring only 75 in the League, compared with 118 in 1932–33.

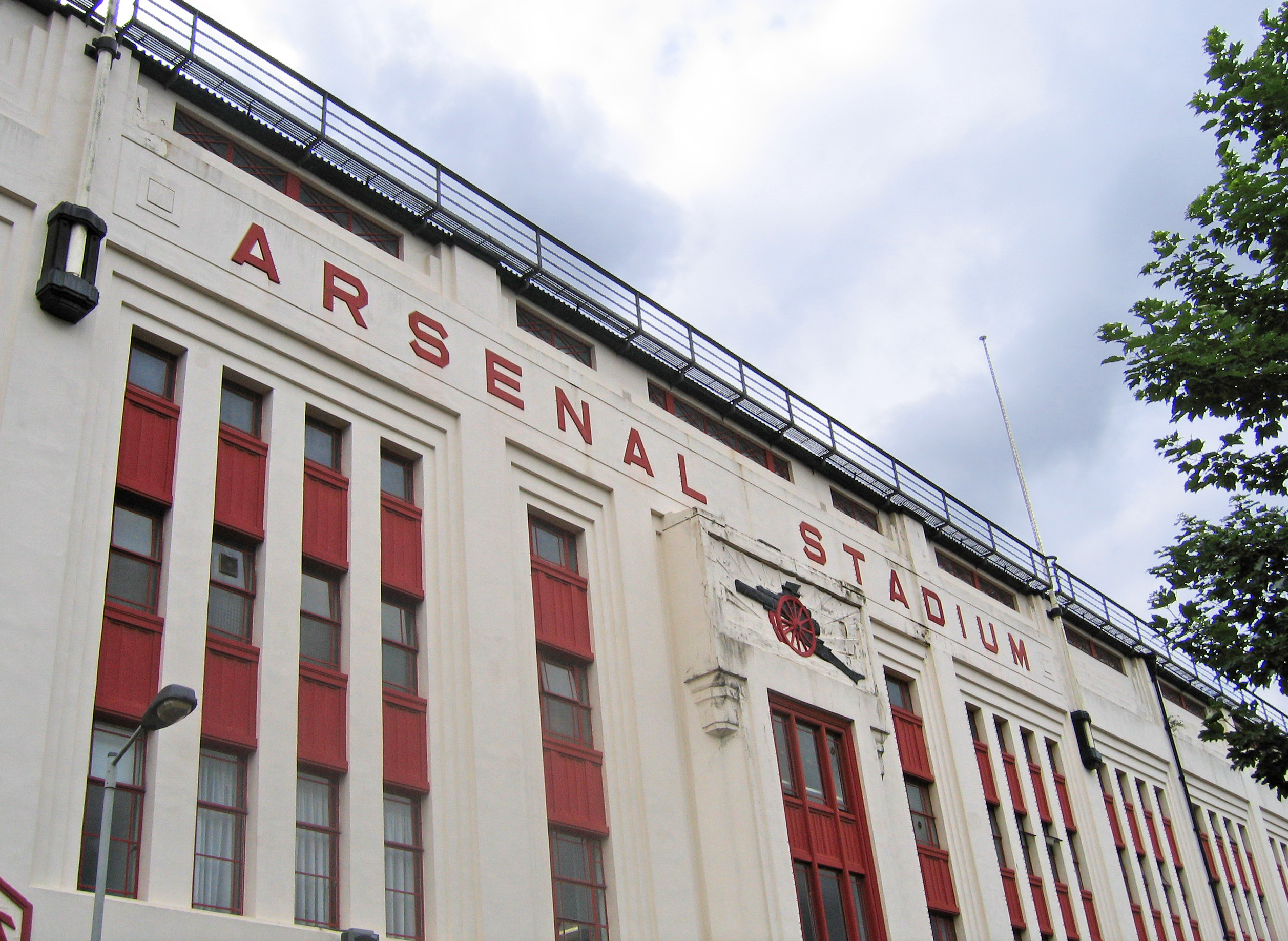
Arsenal Stadium's East Stand, which was built in 1936

George Allison (who had formerly been a director of the club) took over the job of team manager in the summer of 1934 and soon signed new blood for the side, including wing halves Jack Crayston and Wilf Copping (whose signings had been initiated by Chapman), and striker Ted Drake. With these new signings, Allison oversaw the completion of a hat-trick of League titles in 1934–35, and Arsenal were back to their attacking best; Drake scored a club record 42 league goals that season, and Arsenal racked up a series of heavily one-sided scorelines reminiscent of the 1930–31 season (including 7–0 against Wolves, 8–1 against Liverpool, and 8–0 twice, against Leicester City and Middlesbrough). Arsenal's strength was such that seven of the players that played for England against World Champions Italy in 1934 were on Arsenal's books; as of 2019 this remains a record number of players from a single club in an England team. England won 3–2 in an aggressive game dubbed the "Battle of Highbury".

Arsenal's ongoing success attracted larger and larger crowds. The club's home, Highbury, was completely redeveloped, with Leitch's stands from 1913 demolished and replaced with modern Art Deco stands, parts of which remain to this day — the façade of the East Stand is now a Grade II listed building, and both façades have been retained as part of the modern-day redevelopment of Highbury into an apartment complex. Meanwhile, the North Bank and Clock End terraces had roofs installed. The new stadium saw its largest attendance, 73,295, on 9 March 1935 for a match against Sunderland. Arsenal won a second FA Cup in 1935–36, winning 1–0 in the final against Sheffield United, and a fifth League title in 1937–38, pipping Wolves on the final day of the season, to cap off a highly successful decade.

== Second World War (1939–1945) ==
Soon after the outbreak of the Second World War in 1939, all first-class football in Britain was suspended, and the 1939–40 Football League season annulled. Highbury was requisitioned as an ARP station, with a barrage balloon operating behind the Clock End. During the Blitz, a bomb fell on the North Bank, destroying the roof and setting fire to the scrap that was being stored on the terrace. With Highbury closed, Arsenal instead played their home matches at White Hart Lane, home of their rivals Tottenham Hotspur. Wartime matches do not count in official statistics; competitions were played on a regional basis and teams often did not complete a full season; many footballers served in the armed forces as trainers or instructors and were away from their clubs for long periods of time, so they would often star as "guests" at other clubs. Arsenal won the Football League War Cup South in 1942–43 and the Football League (South) or London League titles in 1939–40, 1941–42 and 1942–43. In 1941 Arsenal were one of a number of clubs expelled from membership of the Football League for refusing to participate in the wartime Football League (South) and organising a rebel London League; it was not until April 1942 that they were readmitted after expressing regret and paying a £10 fine.

In November 1945, with league competition still suspended, Arsenal were one of the teams that played a Dynamo Moscow side touring the UK. With many players still serving abroad in the armed forces, Arsenal were severely depleted and used six guest players, including Stanley Matthews and Stan Mortensen, which led Dynamo to declare they were playing an England XI. The match, at White Hart Lane, kicked off in thick fog and Dynamo won 4–3, after Arsenal had led 3–1 at half-time. Though the score is generally agreed upon, after that accounts of the match diverge; even the identity of the goalscorers is disputed. (Note: For example, Cliff Bastin and Bernard Joy, who both played in the game, claimed that Vasili Kartsev scored Dynamo's first goal, while the journalist Brian Glanville, a spectator that day, asserted that it was Vsevolod Bobrov.) English reports alleged that Dynamo fielded twelve players at one point and tried to pressurise the referee into abandoning the match when they had been losing; in turn, the Soviets accused Arsenal of persistent foul play and even alleged that Allison had bet money on the result, a claim that was later retracted. The acrimony after the match was such that it inspired George Orwell to write his 1945 essay The Sporting Spirit, in which he opined on the nature of sport, namely that in his view "it is war minus the shooting".

== Post-war years (1945–1966) ==
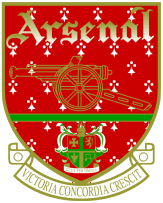
Arsenal adopted this red crest in 1949, which was a familiar sight until its replacement in 2002.

The war claimed the lives of nine Arsenal players, the most of any top-flight club, and the intervening time had cut short the careers of several others, including Bastin and Drake. Additionally, the debts from the construction of Highbury and the costs of repairing war damage were a heavy financial burden, and Arsenal struggled at first when competitive football resumed in 1946. They lost 6–1 on aggregate to West Ham United in the third round of the 1945–46 FA Cup, and upon the league's resumption in 1946–47 the club finished 13th, their worst in 17 years. Allison decided to retire from football at the end of that season, and was replaced by his assistant Tom Whittaker, a long-time servant of the club who had been trainer under Chapman. Whittaker enjoyed immediate success, winning the League title in the 1947–48 season; led by captain Joe Mercer's strong defence and with goals from attacking front two of Reg Lewis and Ronnie Rooke, Arsenal were top of the table from October until the season's climax, winning by a seven-point margin. However, given the age of the Arsenal side at the time (Rooke and Mercer were both over thirty, as were brothers Denis and Leslie Compton), long-term success was not possible. In response, Whittaker had brought in younger players such as Doug Lishman, Alex Forbes and Cliff Holton. Although Arsenal were unable to sustain any challenges for the League title, with the new blood they won the FA Cup in 1949–50, with Reg Lewis scoring both goals in a 2–0 win over Liverpool in the final.

The 1951–52 season saw the club nearly win the Double of League and FA Cup, but ultimately end up empty-handed; a series of injuries and a series of postponements leading to the team having to play ten games in a month at the end of the season saw Arsenal lose their last two matches, including the title decider against eventual champions Manchester United at Old Trafford on the last day of the season; after losing 6–1, the Gunners finished third, equal on points with Tottenham. A week later, Arsenal played Newcastle United in the 1952 FA Cup Final, with several recovering players rushed back into the first team; Walley Barnes was taken off injured with a twisted knee after 35 minutes, and ten-man Arsenal suffered further injuries to Holton, Roper and Daniel, so that by the end of the match they had only seven fully fit players on the pitch; with the numerical advantage in their favour, Newcastle won 1–0 with a goal from George Robledo.

Arsenal won their seventh League title in the 1952–53 season; in one of the closest title races, they beat Preston North End to the title on goal average after finishing level on points. The title looked to be Preston's after Arsenal lost to them 2–0 at Deepdale in the penultimate game of the season, but Arsenal came from behind to beat Burnley 3–2, to take the title by 0.099 of a goal. That proved to be Arsenal's last trophy for 17 years, as the club's fortunes began to wane, particularly after the unexpected death of Whittaker in October 1956. As the club's fortunes declined, they found themselves unable to attract many stars (Welsh international goalkeeper Jack Kelsey being a notable exception), while up and coming players such as David Herd left for more successful clubs. Jack Crayston and George Swindin, both former players, followed Whittaker but could not replicate his success. Apart from finishing third in 1958–59 and fifth in both 1955–56 and 1956–57, Arsenal usually finished in mid-table. Nor did the club have much luck in the FA Cup—after reaching the final in 1951–52, Arsenal would not get beyond the quarter-finals again until 1970–71. Rivals Tottenham Hotspur won the Double in 1960–61.

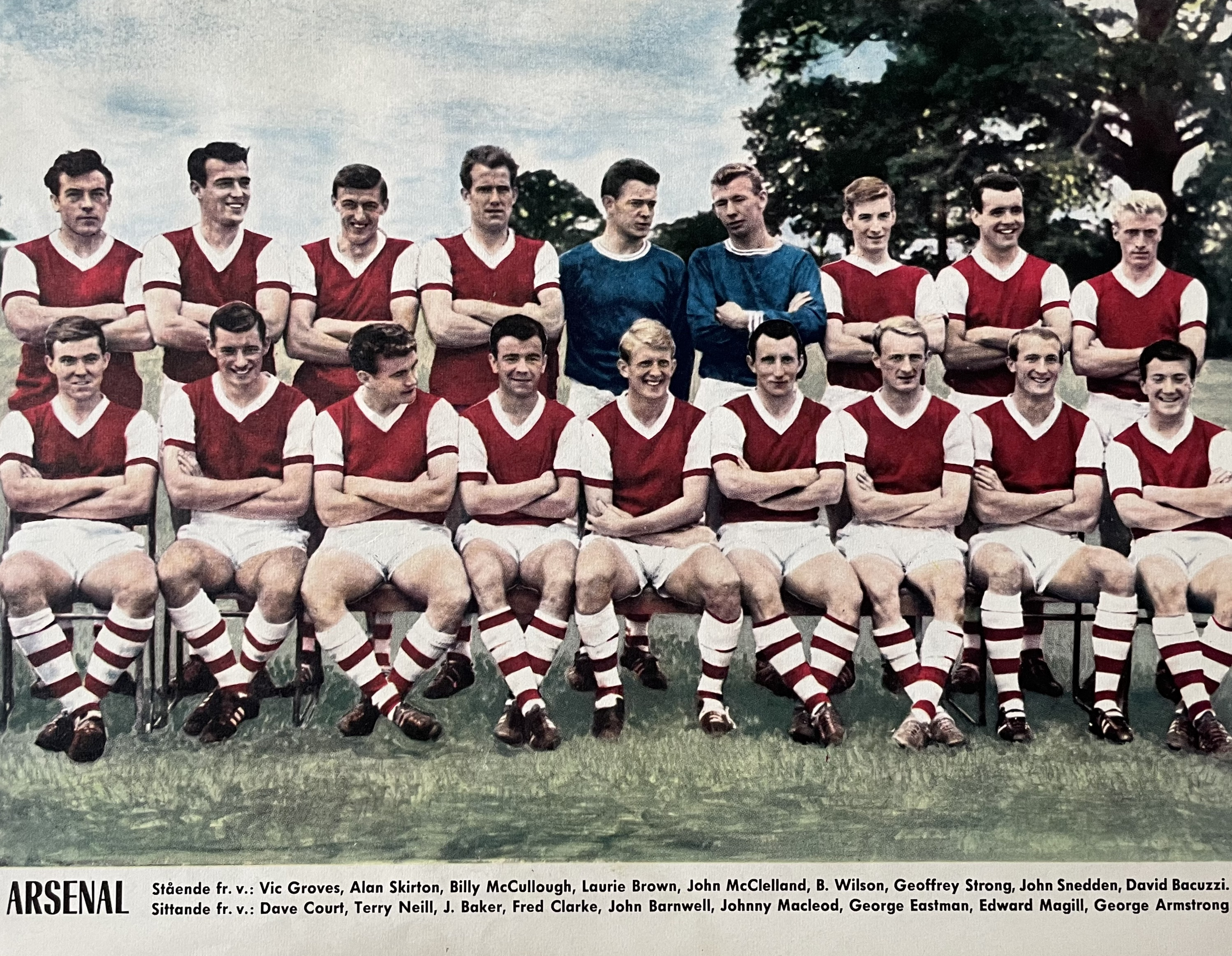
Arsenal F.C. in 1964 with players as Bob Wilson, Geoffrey Strong, John Snedden, David Bacuzzi, Terry Neill, Fred Clark, John Barnwell, Johnny MacLeod, Edward Magill and George Armstrong.

In 1962, Arsenal made the bold but ultimately unsuccessful step of appointing former England and Wolves captain Billy Wright as manager, despite his lack of managerial experience and the fact that he had no prior experience with the club. Like his two immediate predecessors, Wright was not very successful, although it was under his leadership that the club made their debut in European competition, in the 1963–64 Inter-Cities Fairs Cup after finishing seventh in 1962–63. In his final season, Arsenal finished 14th, their lowest position in 36 years, and recorded the lowest attendance at Highbury—4,554 for a match against Leeds United on 5 May 1966. (Note: In mitigation, that same night the 1966 European Cup Winners' Cup final between Borussia Dortmund and Liverpool was screened live on television, a comparatively rare and prestigious event for the time, which partly accounts for the low attendance.) The only Arsenal player to figure in England's 1966 FIFA World Cup-winning squad was George Eastham, who did not play at all during the tournament. Wright was dismissed by the Arsenal board in the summer of 1966 and replaced by club physiotherapist Bertie Mee.
