= List of Arsenal F.C. managers =

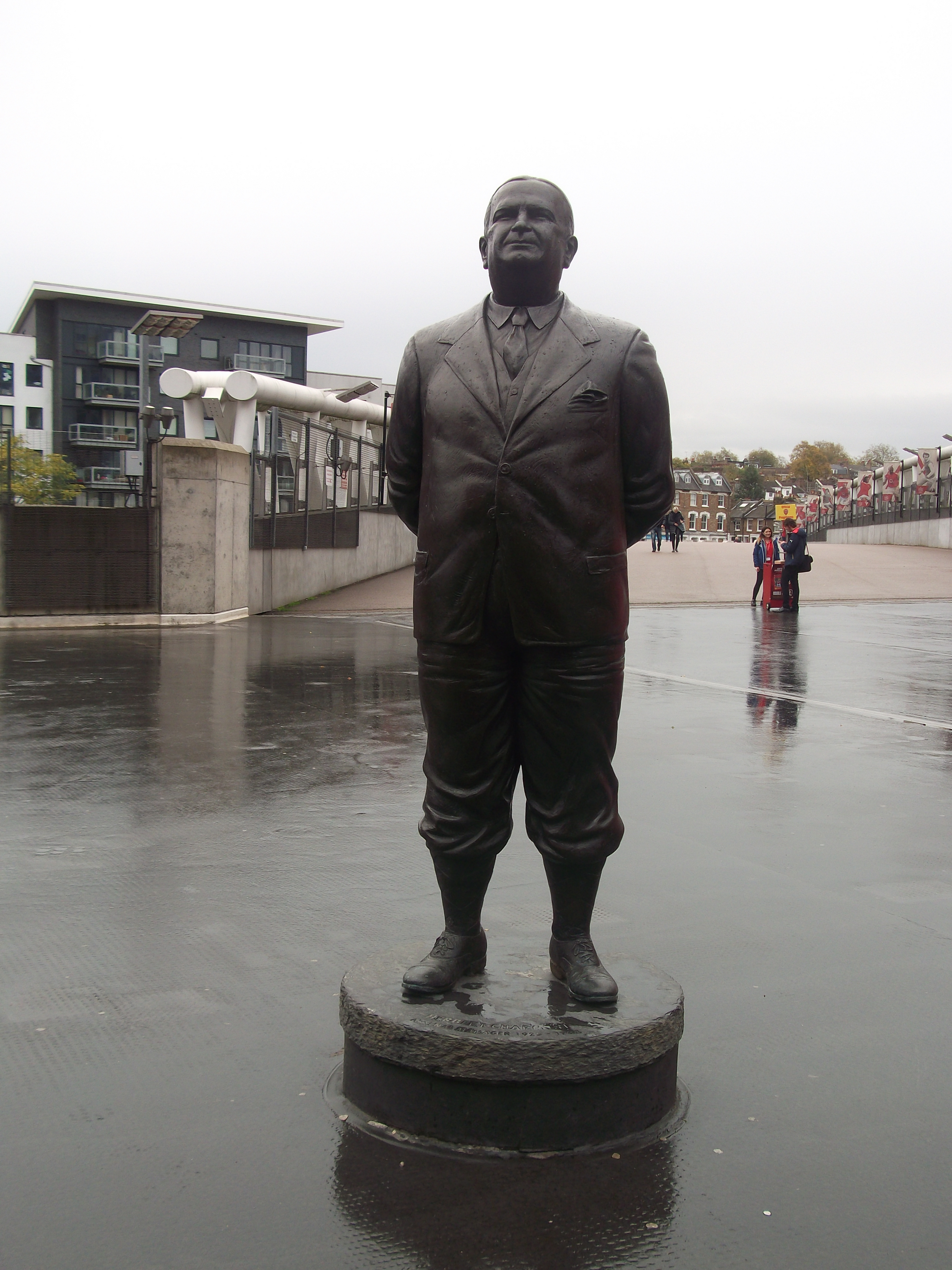
A statue of Herbert Chapman (1878–1934), Arsenal manager from 1925 to 1934

Arsenal Football Club is an English professional association football club based in Islington, London. The club was formed in Woolwich in 1886 as Dial Square before it was shortly renamed to Royal Arsenal, and then Woolwich Arsenal in 1893. They became the first southern member (Note: A club located in the southern counties of England. Initially these were amateur clubs, as professionalism in football was not as readily accepted in the south as in the north. In the 1893–94 season, Arsenal (under its former name Woolwich Arsenal) turned professional and became the first southern club admitted to the northern-oriented Football League. The following year saw the creation of the Southern Football League, which was composed of amateur and professional teams. By the 1920–21 season, the top division of the Southern Football League was absorbed by the Football League, to create its third division.) admitted into the Football League in 1893, having spent their first four seasons solely participating in cup tournaments and friendlies. The club's name was shortened to Arsenal in 1914, a year after moving to Highbury. In spite of finishing fifth in the Second Division in 1915, Arsenal rejoined the First Division at the expense of local rivals Tottenham Hotspur when football resumed after the First World War. Since that time, they have not fallen below the first tier of the English football league system and hold the record for the longest uninterrupted period in the top flight.

There have been twenty permanent and eight caretaker managers of Arsenal since 1897; Stewart Houston has managed the club in two separate spells as caretaker. The most successful person to manage Arsenal is Arsène Wenger, who won three Premier League titles, seven FA Cups and seven Community Shields between 1996 and 2018. Wenger is the club's longest-serving manager; he surpassed George Allison's record of 13 years in October 2009. Two Arsenal managers have died in the job – Herbert Chapman and Tom Whittaker.

This chronological list comprises all those who have held the position of manager of the first team of Arsenal since their foundation in 1886. Each manager's entry includes his dates of tenure and the club's overall competitive record (in terms of matches won, drawn and lost), honours won and significant achievements while under his care. Caretaker managers are included, where known, as well as those who have been in permanent charge.

== Managerial history ==
From 1893 to 1897, team management was undertaken by a committee of directors. The subsequent managerial role was known originally as "secretary-manager", as the manager also managed the club's affairs off the pitch as well as on it. Following the death of Tom Whittaker in 1956, the role was split and all in the role, from then to this day, have been given the title of manager and concentrated mainly on first-team affairs.

=== 1886–1925: Early years ===
Although Arsenal was founded in 1886, it was not until 1897 that the club appointed a permanent manager in charge of first-team affairs, with Thomas Mitchell universally recognised as Arsenal's first professional manager. (Note: Although the club's official website credits Sam Hollis as Arsenal's first "manager" in 1894, other sources claim he was only the club's trainer. and many sources, including the club's own official history, make no mention of Hollis and state that Mitchell was Arsenal's first manager.) Mitchell joined Arsenal five months after resigning from Blackburn Rovers in October 1896. The Scotsman's time at Woolwich Arsenal was brief and he left his post barely a year into his contract, though he did manage to take the club from tenth to fifth in the league. Mitchell guided Arsenal through a respectable cup run which culminated in the first round proper. William Elcoat succeeded Mitchell as manager in April 1898, and set about reviving the squad with new additions. The changes did not have the desired effect; his team finished seventh in a league of 18 and were beaten 6–0 by Derby County in the FA Cup first round. He departed in February 1899, and like his predecessor only remained for a season.

Harry Bradshaw, appointed in the summer of 1899, was faced with several difficulties, not least falling attendances and limited funds to attract the best players. In his five years at Arsenal, he managed to steer the club away from bankruptcy by signing local talent such as Jimmy Ashcroft and Jimmy Jackson, and directed his team's promotion to the First Division in 1903–04. Phil Kelso replaced Bradshaw in the close season and succeeded in keeping the club afloat in the top division. He also steered Arsenal to the semi-final stage of the FA Cup in the 1905–06 and 1906–07 seasons. Kelso departed in February 1908, amid uncertainty over the club's finances, and was replaced by George Morrell, a fellow Scotsman. Morrell's time as manager coincided with Sir Henry Norris' takeover of Arsenal and the club's subsequent relocation to Highbury. Arsenal were relegated to the Second Division in 1913, though the move to North London brought about much larger attendances.

Morrell left Arsenal during the First World War and James McEwen served as caretaker manager, presiding over two matches. Both managers' work over 1914–15 resulted in Arsenal finishing in fifth place and aided the club's re-election to the First Division. When professional football resumed in 1919, Norris appointed Leslie Knighton as the club's manager. Arsenal remained under financial strain during this period and stagnated in the league; Knighton in his autobiography claimed he was under strict instruction to spend little on transfers. His working relationship with Norris moreover deteriorated and in 1925 he was dismissed. The decision to sack Knighton was said to have been made following Arsenal's defeat to West Ham United in the FA Cup, a competition which presented the club's only realistic chance of silverware.

=== 1925–66: Arrival of Chapman, dominance and decline ===
In the close season of 1925, Norris proceeded with wholesale changes at the club and advertised the role of manager in the Athletic News:

Arsenal Football Club is open to receive applications for the position of TEAM MANAGER. He must be experienced and possess the highest qualifications for the post, both as to ability and personal character. Gentlemen whose sole ability to build up a good side depends on the payment of heavy and exhorbitant [sic] transfer fees need not apply.

The notice caught the attention of Huddersfield Town manager Herbert Chapman, who according to journalist and former Arsenal player Bernard Joy wanted to manage a London club: "Arsenal appealed to him because it was a struggling club, something he could work on and make a power in the land." He joined Arsenal in June 1925, and laid the foundations for the club's first period of success. Considered the "great innovator" of English football, Chapman introduced numbered shirts, advocated floodlights at Highbury and successfully campaigned for Gillespie Road station to be renamed to Arsenal on the London Underground. He also introduced new training techniques and tactics, adopting a "WM" formation in order to counter a change in the offside law.

One of Chapman's first decisions was to bring in Sunderland striker Charlie Buchan, recognising Arsenal's lack of goal threat. Arsenal finished second in Chapman's first season, a marked improvement on previous seasons, though finished no higher as the 1920s drew to a close. Chapman continued to reshape his team and buy players to fit his desired system. He led Arsenal to their first major trophy, as they beat his former side Huddersfield Town 2–0 in the 1930 FA Cup Final. The team continued to mature and won the 1930–31 First Division title, scoring 127 goals in the process. Chapman won another championship in 1932–33, after Arsenal ended the previous season as league and 1932 FA Cup runners-up.

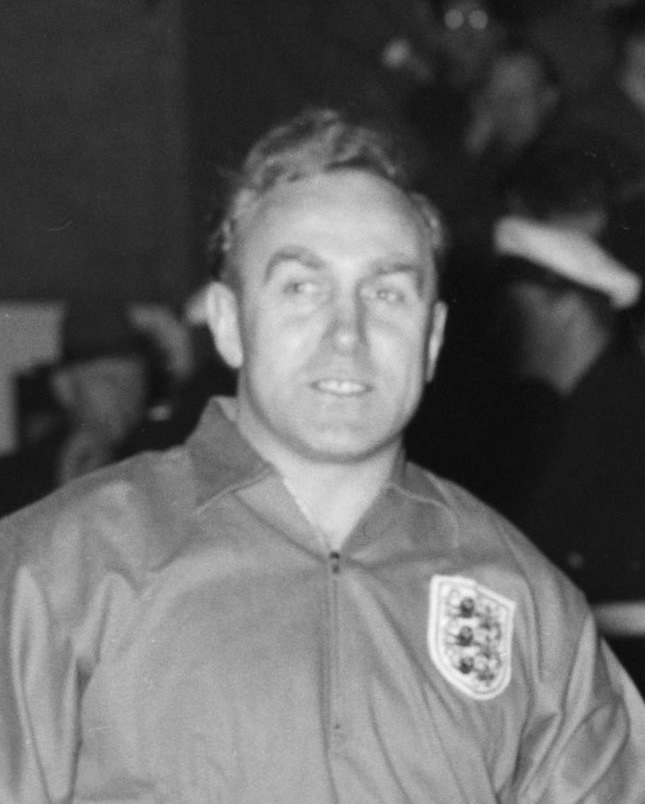
Billy Wright (1924–1994), manager of Arsenal from 1962 to 1966

In the early hours of 6 January 1934, Chapman died at his home in Hendon. Arsenal were top of the table by the New Year, but their league form stuttered as a result of Chapman's unexpected death. Joe Shaw stood in as caretaker manager and continued Chapman's good work, as Arsenal won the 1933–34 First Division title. In May 1934, Arsenal appointed George Allison, beginning a successful thirteen-year spell as manager. The club retained the league title in 1934–35 and in the next season defeated Sheffield United in the 1936 FA Cup Final. Arsenal won another championship in 1937–38, their fifth in eight years, to reinforce their position as the dominant team of the 1930s. Britain's involvement in the Second World War meant the ordinary football calendar was abandoned. In the early part of the 1940s, Arsenal participated in various wartime competitions, still managed by Allison.

Allison resigned in 1947, a year after professional football resumed, and his position was taken over by Tom Whittaker, the club's first-team trainer. Intent on playing an expansive style of football, he purchased Don Roper and converted Ian McPherson's position from defender to winger. The changes had the desired effect as Arsenal won the 1947–48 First Division championship. Whittaker won the club's third FA Cup in 1950 and repeated early league success in 1952–53. The club's success began to wane after this, which in turn commenced a stressful period for Whittaker. In October 1956 he died of a heart attack, aged 58. Jack Crayston presided over first-team affairs as caretaker, before he was named permanent manager at the end of 1956. His time was brief compared to his predecessors and left the club in May 1958, achieving a twelfth-place finish in the league.

Former Arsenal goalkeeper George Swindin returned to the club in June 1958 as manager. His tenure started well as he guided the club to a top-three position in the league, but subsequent mid-table finishes and poor cup showings led to his departure in May 1962. Swindin's replacement Billy Wright fared no better and journalist Brian Glanville wrote of his spell: "He had neither the guile nor the authority to make things work and he reacted almost childishly to criticism." Though Wright failed to guide Arsenal to former successes, he led Arsenal to a seventh-place finish in 1962–63, which ensured qualification for their first European competition, the Inter-Cities Fairs Cup.

=== 1966–96: Double winners, further league success ===
Wright was sacked by Arsenal in June 1966 and the board of directors hired the club's physiotherapist Bertie Mee as his successor. Mee insisted on an escape clause in his contract provided if the arrangement did not work, which the club duly obliged. The position became permanent eleven months later, even though Arsenal were 14th in the league table. The club's fortunes changed under Mee however, as he started to bed in youth players. He led Arsenal to successive League Cup final appearances in 1968 and 1969, and ended the club's 17-year wait for silverware when his side beat Anderlecht in the 1970 Inter-Cities Fairs Cup Final. Mee's greatest triumph was the club's league and cup double of 1970–71, but he struggled to better that achievement, having made radical changes to a successful team.

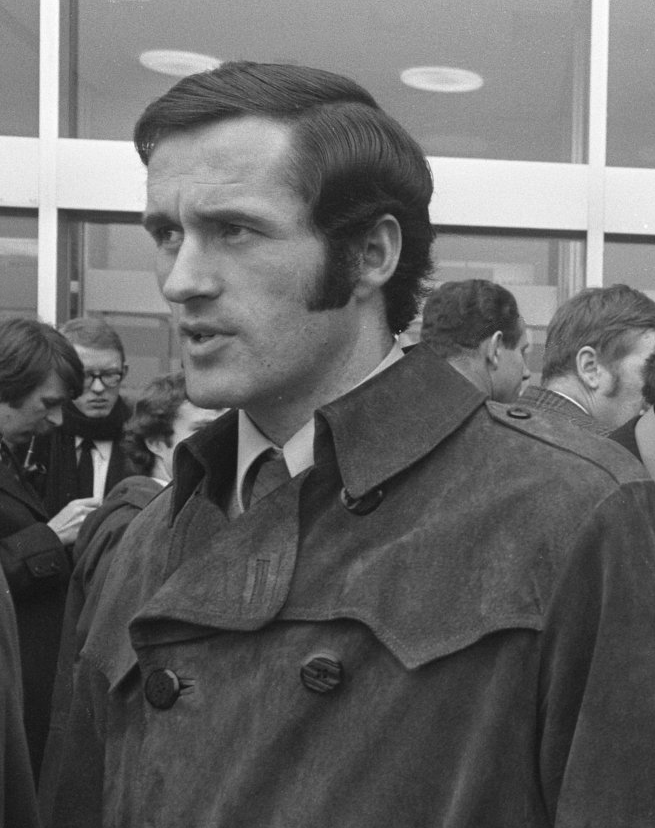
George Graham (pictured in 1970) won two league championships as Arsenal manager.

When Mee resigned at the end of 1975–76, the board opted for Terry Neill as their next manager. He arrived after guiding Tottenham Hotspur to a ninth-place finish, but his association with Arsenal's local rivals created animosity between himself and the club's fans. Neill led Arsenal to three FA Cup finals between 1978 and 1980, succeeding in the "five-minute final" of 1979. He took them to the 1980 Cup Winners' Cup Final, which they lost in a penalty-shootout to Spanish team Valencia. Poor league form and a surprise exit in the League Cup to Walsall led to Neill's dismissal midway through 1983–84. Don Howe was promoted as manager, initially in a caretaker capacity. Though his three years brought no major silverware, he was responsible for giving debuts to several players such as Tony Adams and David Rocastle, who served the club well during the late 1980s.

Howe departed in March 1986, and Steve Burtenshaw stood in for two months as caretaker. After making a tentative offer to Alex Ferguson, (Note: Ferguson was offered the Arsenal job after Howe's departure, but his commitment to the Scotland national team as temporary manager, coupled with Arsenal's insistence to reach a deal meant the proposal fell through. He eventually joined Manchester United in November 1986.) the board settled on appointing George Graham. He led Arsenal to appearances in the League Cup final in each of his first two seasons, winning in 1987, before losing in 1988. Arsenal's performances in the league also improved and in Graham's third season his team won the league championship in unprecedented fashion, defeating title rivals Liverpool by two clear goals on the final night of the season to be crowned champions on goals scored. He won his second league title in 1990–91, fielding a side that only lost one game throughout the season.

Arsenal's European Cup defeat to Benfica in October 1991 is regarded as a watershed moment in Graham's managerial career. He altered his tactics and built a stubborn team, which lacked the creativity associated with the first half of his Arsenal reign. Graham's Arsenal struggled to put together a title challenge in the newly-formed Premier League, but were cup specialists in the early half of the nineties. In 1992–93, Graham became the first manager to win the FA Cup and League Cup in the same season. A season later, he guided Arsenal to their first European trophy for almost a quarter of a century, as the team won the UEFA Cup Winners' Cup.

Graham was dismissed in February 1995, for bringing the club into disrepute over his transfer misconduct. He was found guilty of financial impropriety by a league investigation, leaving the board with no other choice but to terminate his contract. Stewart Houston came in as caretaker and revitalised the squad, taking Arsenal to the 1995 UEFA Cup Winners' Cup Final. The Arsenal board subsequently hired Bruce Rioch, on a three-year deal in June 1995. Rioch's tenure lasted just 61 weeks and in his only season at the club, he guided Arsenal to fifth position, which came with a UEFA Cup spot. Rioch was sacked in August 1996, amid reports of disagreements with vice-chairman David Dein.

=== 1996–2018: Wenger era ===
The dismissal of Rioch meant Houston was once again put in temporary charge of first-team affairs. When Houston left Arsenal to eventually become the Queens Park Rangers manager, his position was taken up by Pat Rice. Frenchman Arsène Wenger, in the meantime, agreed a deal with the Arsenal board to become the club's next manager. His appointment was confirmed in September 1996, after receiving an early release from Japanese club Nagoya Grampus Eight. Hill-Wood was highly optimistic of Wenger, despite the track record that came with previous foreign managers in the Premier League:

I believe Arsène Wenger is going to be a great success and drag football in this country into the 20th century. There is no doubt in my mind we are blinkered and backward as a sporting nation. Look at the British results in Europe, they were not good, including ours. We keep telling ourselves we have the best league in Europe, but it is not true. We need to catch up with the Continentals and we think Arsène is the man to help us.

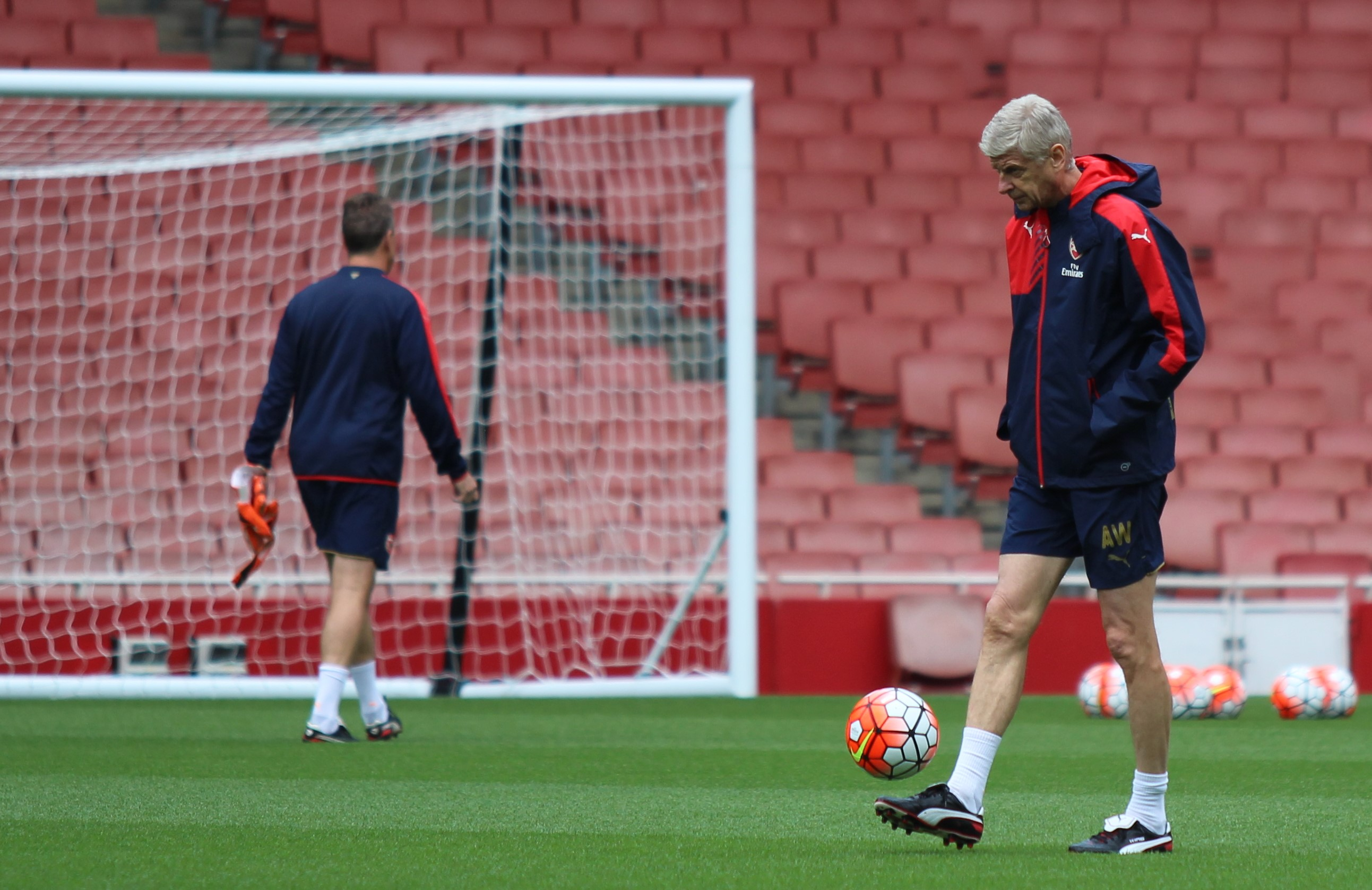
Arsène Wenger is Arsenal's longest serving manager.

Wenger has been credited with promoting the importance of diet and nutrition in football and advocating the principle that the sport ought to be entertaining on the pitch. The signings of Patrick Vieira, Emmanuel Petit, Marc Overmars and Nicolas Anelka, combined with the club's many experienced players, helped Arsenal win the double in 1997–98. Wenger led Arsenal to another double in 2001–02; his team scored in every Premier League game that season and won their remaining 13 matches to clinch the title. A year later, Wenger became the first manager since Keith Burkinshaw 21 years previously to retain the FA Cup; Arsenal beat Southampton 1–0 in the final. Wenger won his third league title in 2003–04, which earnt distinction as he guided his team to an unbeaten league season, something achieved only once before in English football, by Preston North End in 1888–89. Another FA Cup was won in 2005, this time on penalties against Manchester United. Wenger took Arsenal to their first UEFA Champions League final in 2006 and in the same year oversaw the club's relocation to the Emirates Stadium. In October 2009, Wenger surpassed Allinson to become Arsenal's longest serving manager and reflected the club were "maybe not crazy, but brave" to appoint him.

During 2013–14, Wenger celebrated his 1,000th game in charge of Arsenal and in the process became the fourth manager in English football (after Sir Matt Busby, Dario Gradi and Sir Alex Ferguson) to do so. The match however did not go as Wenger planned, as the team were beaten 6–0 by Chelsea. Wenger guided Arsenal to further FA Cup success at the end of the season, after a period of nine years without silverware. His team retained the cup the following year, and victory against Chelsea in the 2017 final placed Wenger as the most successful manager in the competition's history with seven trophies. Wenger signed a two-year extension once the season was over to take his contract to the end of the 2018–19 Season.

On 20 April 2018, Wenger announced he would step down as Arsenal manager at the end of the 2017–18 season. This season saw Wenger's Arsenal get knocked out of the FA Cup at the Third round stage for the first and only time in his 22 seasons at the club, while Arsenal made it through to the 2018 League Cup Final where they lost to Manchester City. Wenger made it to 3 EFL Cups finals with Arsenal but never won that competition.

His final home game was a 5–0 win against Burnley on 6 May 2018, where he received a standing ovation before the game and was gifted the gold mini-replica Premier League trophy he won during the 2003–04 Invincibles season as a departing gift from Arsenal. He officially concluded his tenure with a 1–0 away win against Huddersfield Town. Wenger later revealed that he wanted to stay at the club until the expiration of his contract, but the club thought it better he leave, with the board informing him in January of their decision to end his contract at the end of the season. He described the hostility he faced from the board and fans as "unjustified" and his exit as "very hard" and "very brutal".

=== 2018–present: Post-Wenger era ===
After conducting an overhaul in the club's operating model to coincide with Wenger's departure, Spaniard Unai Emery was named as the club's new head coach on 23 May 2018. He became the club's first ever 'head coach' and second manager from outside the United Kingdom. In Emery's first season, Arsenal finished fifth in the Premier League and as runner-up in the Europa League. On 29 November 2019, with Arsenal sitting in eighth place in the league, Emery was dismissed as manager and former player and assistant first team coach Freddie Ljungberg was appointed as interim head coach.

In December 2019, Arsenal appointed former club captain Mikel Arteta as the new head coach. In a season heavily impacted by the COVID-19 pandemic, Arsenal finished the league season in eighth, their lowest finish since 1994–95, but beat Chelsea 2–1 to earn a record-extending 14th FA Cup win. After the season, Arteta's title was changed from head coach to manager and then in August went on to win the 2020 Community Shield against league champions Liverpool. Arsenal finished the 2020-21 season in eighth place once again and did not win a cup competition and therefore not qualifying for a European competition for the first time in 26 years.

Arteta guided Arsenal to a fifth place Premier League finish in the 2021–22 campaign; having looked likely to finish in the top four, and hence qualify for the Champions League for the first time in six seasons, until the final three games where they were overtaken by rivals Tottenham. The whole season was documented in the Amazon Prime Video series All or Nothing: Arsenal, which allowed viewers to see candidly Arteta management style and tactics.

In the 2022–23 season, Arsenal finished second in the Premier League, their highest league finish since 2016, and qualified for the UEFA Champions League for the first time in seven years. The club repeated this feat in the 2023–24 and 2024–25 seasons, securing three consecutive second-place finishes. Arteta led Arsenal to a first place finish in the league after a consistent second place finishes in the last 3 seasons, winning the Premier League for the first time in 22 years.

== Managers ==
- Manager dates and statistics are sourced from The Arsenal History for Mitchell to Wenger, and Soccerbase thereafter for Wenger, Emery, Ljungberg and Arteta's results. Nationalities of named managers are sourced from Soar & Tyler (2011). Names of caretaker managers are supplied where known, and periods of caretaker management are highlighted in italics and marked † or ‡, depending on the scenario. Win percentage is rounded to two decimal places.
- Only first-team competitive matches are counted; games in the various wartime competitions and the abandoned 1939–40 Football League season are excluded. Wins, losses and draws are results at the final whistle; the results of penalty shoot-outs are not counted.
- Statistics are complete up to and including the match played on 7 November 2026.

Key

- M = matches played; W = matches won; D = matches drawn; L = matches lost; GF = Goals for; GA = Goals against; Win % = percentage of total matches won
- † Managers with this background and symbol in the "Name" column are italicised to denote caretaker appointments.
- ‡ Managers with this background and symbol in the "Name" column are italicised to denote caretaker appointments promoted to full-time manager.

List of Arsenal F.C. managers
Manager	Nationality	From	To	M	W	D	L	GF	GA	Win %	Honours	Notes
Thomas Mitchell	Scotland	30 March 1897	10 March 1898	45	23	8	14	106	79	51.11		
Unknown †		11 March 1898	April 1898	9	6	2	1	21	8	66.67		
William Elcoat	England	11 April 1898	16 February 1899	44	21	6	17	86	67	47.73		
Arthur Kennedy †	England	21 February 1899	29 April 1899	15	8	3	4	31	17	53.33		
Harry Bradshaw	England	30 June 1899	30 April 1904	235	118	44	73	403	237	50.21		
Phil Kelso	Scotland	1 May 1904	9 February 1908	152	63	31	58	225	229	41.45		
George Morrell	Scotland	10 February 1908	13 April 1915	309	113	74	122	392	428	36.57		
James McEwen †	England	19 April 1915	24 May 1919	2	1	0	1	7	3	50.00		(Note: Though not officially named secretary-manager, McEwen was in charge of first team-affairs at Arsenal and thus de facto manager after Morrell left the club; the vast majority of his time he oversaw wartime matches, which do not count toward the official record.)
Leslie Knighton	England	25 May 1919	16 May 1925	286	105	63	118	367	401	36.71		
Herbert Chapman	England	11 June 1925	6 January 1934	411	204	97	110	879	616	49.64	First Division champions: 1930–31, 1932–33 FA Cup winners: 1929–30 Charity Shield winners: 1930, 1931, 1933	
Joe Shaw †	England	6 January 1934	28 May 1934	23	14	3	6	44	29	60.87	First Division champions: 1933–34	(Note: Joe Shaw was appointed caretaker manager, while John Peters was appointed caretaker secretary.)
George Allison	England	28 May 1934	31 May 1947	279	129	74	76	534	327	46.24	First Division champions: 1934–35, 1937–38 FA Cup winners: 1935–36 Charity Shield winners: 1934, 1938	
Tom Whittaker	England	2 June 1947	24 October 1956	430	203	106	121	802	568	47.21	First Division champions: 1947–48, 1952–53 FA Cup winners: 1949–50 Charity Shield winners: 1948, 1953	(Note: Whittaker was taken ill in early 1956, and although he officially remained in charge at the start of the 1956–57 season, in practice Jack Crayston was team manager from then up until Whittaker's death in October.)
Jack Crayston ‡	England	24 October 1956	19 May 1958	81	34	17	30	148	151	41.98		
George Swindin	England	21 June 1958	1 May 1962	186	76	43	67	336	330	40.86		
Billy Wright	England	1 May 1962	13 June 1966	182	70	43	69	336	330	38.46		
Bertie Mee ‡	England	20 June 1966	4 May 1976	539	241	148	150	739	542	44.71	First Division champions: 1970–71 FA Cup winners: 1970–71 Inter-Cities Fairs Cup winners: 1969–70	
Terry Neill	Northern Ireland	9 July 1976	16 December 1983	416	187	117	112	601	446	44.95	FA Cup winners: 1978–79	
Don Howe ‡	England	16 December 1983	22 March 1986	117	54	32	31	187	142	46.15		
Steve Burtenshaw †	England	23 March 1986	14 May 1986	11	3	2	6	7	15	27.27		
George Graham	Scotland	14 May 1986	21 February 1995	460	225	133	102	711	403	48.91	First Division champions: 1988–89, 1990–91 FA Cup winners: 1992–93 Football League Cup winners: 1986–87, 1992–93 Charity Shield winners: 1991 (shared) UEFA Cup Winners' Cup winners: 1993–94	
Stewart Houston †	Scotland	21 February 1995	15 June 1995	19	7	3	9	29	25	36.84		
Bruce Rioch	Scotland	15 June 1995	12 August 1996	47	22	15	10	67	37	46.81		
Stewart Houston †	Scotland	12 August 1996	13 September 1996	6	2	2	2	11	10	33.33		
Pat Rice †	Northern Ireland	13 September 1996	30 September 1996	4	3	0	1	10	4	75.00		
Arsène Wenger	France	1 October 1996	13 May 2018	1,235	707	280	248	2,156	1,147	57.25	Premier League champions: 1997–98, 2001–02, 2003–04 FA Cup winners: 1997–98, 2001–02, 2002–03, 2004–05, 2013–14, 2014–15, 2016–17 Charity/Community Shield winners: 1998, 1999, 2002, 2004, 2014, 2015, 2017	(Note: Although Wenger's appointment was announced before Arsenal's match against Sunderland on 28 September 1996, Pat Rice remained in charge of the first team for that game and Wenger did not officially take over until 1 October 1996.) (Note: Wenger's statistics include the FA Cup match played against Sheffield United on 13 February 1999; Arsenal won 2–1 but the match was replayed following a controversy about the winning goal.)
Unai Emery	Spain	23 May 2018	29 November 2019	78	43	16	19	152	100	55.13		
Freddie Ljungberg (interim)	Sweden	29 November 2019	21 December 2019	6	1	3	2	8	10	16.67		
Mikel Arteta	Spain	22 December 2019	Present	370	227	69	74	690	345	61.35	Premier League champions: 2025–26 FA Cup winners: 2019–20 Community Shield winners: 2020, 2023, 2026	
