= 1935 FA Charity Shield =

- Event: FA Charity Shield
Sheffield Wednesday	Arsenal
1	0
- Date: 23 October 1935
- Venue: Highbury, London
- Attendance: "Under 15,000"

The 1935 FA Charity Shield was the 22nd FA Charity Shield, a football match between the winners of the previous season's First Division and FA Cup competitions. The match was contested by league champions Arsenal and FA Cup winners Sheffield Wednesday, and was played at Highbury, the home ground of Arsenal. Sheffield Wednesday won 1–0.

Arsenal were making their fifth appearance out of six Charity Shields, and they had won the previous four in which they had played, including a 2–1 victory over Sheffield Wednesday in the 1930 final. Sheffield Wednesday were making their second and as of 2016 most recent appearance in the competition.

The match was criticized as a poor game in which Arsenal under-performed. Wednesday were praised for their direct attacking play and solid defending. The only goal of the game was scored by Neil Dewar, after Arsenal failed to clear the ball at a corner. The second half of the match was broadcast with live commentary by George Allison – who was also the Arsenal manager – on the BBC's Regional radio station.

== Match details ==
23 October 1935

Arsenal	0–1	Sheffield Wednesday
		Dewar

Highbury, London
Attendance: "Under 15,000"

Arsenal	Sheffield Wednesday

GK	(Scotland) Alex Wilson
DF	(England) George Male
DF	(England) Eddie Hapgood (c)
MF	(Scotland) Frank Hill
MF	(England) Bernard Joy
MF	(England) Wilf Copping
FW	(England) Jack Crayston
FW	(Scotland) Jackie Milne
FW	(Republic of Ireland) Jimmy Dunne
FW	(Scotland) Bobby Davidson
FW	(England) Cliff Bastin
Manager:
(England) George Allison

GK	(England) Jack Brown
DF	(Scotland) Joe Nibloe
DF	(England) Ted Catlin
MF	(England) R. Rhodes
MF	(England) Walter Millership
MF	(England) Horace Burrows
FW	(England) Mark Hooper
FW	(Scotland) Bobbie Bruce
FW	(Scotland) Neil Dewar
FW	(England) Ronnie Starling (c)
FW	(England) Ellis Rimmer
Manager:
(England) Billy Walker
