= 1936 FA Cup final =

- Harry Hooper of Sheffield United and Alex James of Arsenal shake hands at the start of the match
- Event: 1935–36 FA Cup
Arsenal	Sheffield United
1	0
- Date: 25 April 1936
- Venue: Wembley Stadium, London
- Referee: Harry Nattrass (County Durham)
- Attendance: 93,384

The 1936 FA Cup final was a football match between Arsenal and Sheffield United on 25 April 1936 at Wembley. The showpiece match of English football's primary cup competition, the Football Association Challenge Cup (better known as the FA Cup), it was the 61st Cup final, and the fourteenth at the national stadium.

Each team received a bye to the third round of the tournament, and then progressed through five rounds before reaching the final. Arsenal were in a successful phase, with this final following recent First Division titles, while Sheffield United were attempting to emulate the success of their rivals Sheffield Wednesday in the tournament the year before. A closely fought first half was followed by a dominant second half by Arsenal, who won by a single goal, scored by Ted Drake in the 74th minute. A media ban by the stadium's bosses caused reporters to fly above the stadium in autogyros to see the match and the BBC experimented with sports commentators for the first time during its live broadcast of the final.

== Route to the final ==
=== Arsenal ===
Round	Opposition	Score	Venue
3rd	Bristol Rovers	5–1	Eastville Stadium (a)
4th	Liverpool	2–0	Anfield (a)
5th	Newcastle	3–3	St James' Park (a)
5th (replay)	Newcastle	3–0	Arsenal Stadium (h)
Quarter-final	Barnsley	4–1	Arsenal Stadium (h)
Semi-final	Grimsby Town	1–0	Leeds Road (n)

Being from the First and Second Divisions respectively, both Arsenal and Sheffield United were seeded into the third round of the FA Cup. In the third round itself, Arsenal were drawn away against Third Division South team Bristol Rovers. Arsenal missed a penalty, and the Third Division team went a goal up in the first half; Arsenal were playing so poorly that it seemed they would struggle even for a draw. The turnaround in the match occurred when Cliff Bastin took over from Bobby Davidson at the inside left position. Arsenal equalised in the 65th minute, and scored further four times over the course of the following fourteen minutes to win the game by five goals to one, with a single goal from Bowden and two each from Drake and Bastin.

They followed this in the fourth round with a 2–0 victory over Liverpool at Anfield. The match was played seven days after the death of King George V, with both teams wearing black armbands. The crowd of 60,000 stood to sing Abide with Me and God Save the King before the kickoff. In the fifth round they were drawn against Newcastle United, in a rematch of the 1932 final. Newcastle had already knocked out the current cup holders, Sheffield Wednesday, in an earlier round. On the day, the gates to St James' Park needed to be closed before the match started to keep additional spectators out, some 64,484 fans already being inside the ground. The match resulted in a 3–3 draw, Arsenal having gone a goal ahead each time, but Newcastle coming back and equalising. The reason being according to the report in The Times was because "Whenever the lead was gained, the side concentrated entirely on defence." In the replay at home, Arsenal won the game 3–0. They had gone a goal up in the first half from a penalty scored by Bastin after the Newcastle centre half David Davidson handled the ball in the box. Newcastle were unlucky not to draw level, and only Eddie Hapgood clearing a shot off the line prevented the scoreline being equal once more. The second goal came during an advance by Arsenal, where the Newcastle goalkeeper, Norman Tapken, cleared the ball directly to Arsenal midfielder Pat Beasley, who shot the ball into the back of an empty net. The final goal was another penalty, caused when Bastin was brought down in the box, who then promptly took and scored the shot himself.

In their quarter final, they defeated Second Division Barnsley 4–1, having outplayed them right from the start, the first goal coming in the fourth minute from Beasley in an attacking move. Bowden scored the second goal, and the third came from a penalty scored by Bastin. The fourth and final Arsenal goal was Beasley's second, with Barnsley's consolation goal coming a couple of minutes from the end of the match. In the semi-final, played at Huddersfield Town's ground, Arsenal beat Grimsby Town 1–0 in a match that was described by reporters as completely one-sided, with the goal coming from Bastin five minutes before half-time.

=== Sheffield United ===
Round	Opposition	Score	Venue
3rd	Burnley	0–0	Turf Moor (a)
3rd (replay)	Burnley	2–1	Bramall Lane (h)
4th	Preston North End	0–0	Deepdale (a)
4th (replay)	Preston North End	2–0	Bramall Lane (h)
5th	Leeds United	3–1	Bramall Lane (h)
Quarter-final	Tottenham Hotspur	3–1	Bramall Lane (h)
Semi-final	Fulham	2–1	Molineux Stadium (n)

Meanwhile, Sheffield United's third round match at Burnley ended in a 0–0 draw, before winning 2–1 in the replay at home on a snow-covered pitch in a game that was marred by heavy fog at the start. Harold Barton scored for United, before Ted Hancock equalized for Burnley. Bobby Barclay scored United's second goal before the break. An additional goal by Jock Dodds for United was disallowed in the second half due to the player being ruled offside.

The fourth round saw them drawn away again, this time at Preston North End again drawing 0–0 in the initial match, the return match at home on 30 January this time resulting in a 2–0 victory after playing the entire second half with only ten men in front of a crowd of 34,259 supporters. In comparison, a record crowd of 68,287 at Bramall Lane saw Sheffield United defeat Leeds United 3–1, the first time in the tournament they won without going to a replay. They repeated that scoreline against Tottenham Hotspur in the quarter-final on a marshy pitch in driving snow. United were up by half time thanks to a goal by Barclay. In the second half, Spurs came back strongly, but two goals from Dodds won the game for United, with Tottenham scoring a consolation goal late on.

Sheffield United were drawn against Fulham in the semi-final, which guaranteed that a Second Division team would make it through to the final. The match was held at Wolverhampton Wanderers' Molineux Stadium on 21 March, where United won 2–1. The two teams faced each other again a week later in a league match, where Fulham won 1–0 thanks to a penalty, ending an unbeaten run of 22 games for United.

== Pre-match ==
Arsenal crest at the time

Arsenal had most recently appeared in the final in 1932, being defeated by Newcastle United, while their most recent FA Cup victory came two seasons earlier in 1930 against Huddersfield Town. Meanwhile, Sheffield United had won the title in their previous appearance, beating Cardiff City in the 1925 final. Arsenal had been the more successful team in recent years, having won three First Division titles in succession in the past few seasons; while Sheffield United were keen to win the trophy after the success of rival team Sheffield Wednesday in the 1935 Final.

Both teams had provided players to the England national football team earlier in the month for a match against Scotland, with Arsenal providing George Male, Jack Crayston and Cliff Bastin, while Sheffield United gave Bobby Barclay. Alex James, despite being Arsenal's captain and having previously played for the Scottish international team, was not chosen for that match, which resulted in a 1–1 draw, enabling Scotland to win the 1936 British Home Championship.

Wembley bosses were in dispute with newsreel companies over the broadcast rights for the 1936 final. Gaumont British Film Company initially had offered £900 to film inside the ground, but this was refused by the authorities who wanted a sum of £1,500. They later backed down and said that they would accept the initial offer, but the film company was now only willing to pay £500. A solution could not be reached, and the media were banned from inside of the stadium. To get around the ban and be able to report on the match, a number of autogyros were hired to fly the reporters over the stadium giving them a birds–eye view of the match, with the only filming inside Wembley conducted by the official stadium cameraman. Autogyros had been used to film the final in 1935, and also by the Metropolitan police for crowd control.

It was the first year that commentators were used in the broadcast of an FA Cup final, with the BBC describing it as an "experiment". The first commentators were Ivan Sharpe and Norman Creek, who broadcast from 2:30 pm onwards before the game to take in the pre–match entertainment.

Arsenal played in red and white shirts in an FA Cup final for the first time, as on previous occasions in 1930 and 1932 they had worn fully red shirts. Additionally, before the 1967–68 season, Arsenal only wore team badges on their shirts on special occasions, such as FA Cup finals. The 1936 Cup final was the fourth occasion such a badge was worn. Sheffield United also wore crested red and white shirts, with a vertical stripe design.

== Match ==
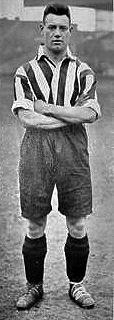
Bobby Barclay, inside forward for Sheffield United

More than 93,000 spectators attended the match, with fans from Sheffield travelling from the north on specially laid-on trains. Changes to the teams were made before the match, with Ted Drake available for Arsenal following an injury. Sheffield United replaced Don Bird with Bertie Williams on the outside left, and Charlie Wilkinson was brought back into the team to replace Albert Cox who had played in the semi-final against Fulham while Wilkinson was injured.

While the weather was fine, the wind whipped up to such an extent at pitch level that the ball was taken out of its proper flight on occasion. In the third minute Sheffield United were nearly a goal up after Arsenal goalkeeper Wilson dropped the ball to the ground and fumbled at it trying to pick it up. United players Barclay and Dodds both charged in to take advantage, but an Arsenal defender cleared the ball away before they could turn the opportunity into a goal. During the first fifteen minutes, United were the superior team with the work of their forwards only failing against the work of Arsenal's full backs and goalkeeper with Wilson continuing to looking not entirely safe. Arsenal's defenders eventually settled with Crayston and Copping stepping up for their team.

During the match, the attacks of Arsenal were mostly held at bay by Sheffield United's backs, with Bowden and Bastin both performing poorly, although it was Bastin who set up the move that resulted in the only goal of the game. Arsenal's attacking tactics had favored these two players, with not much play going through to Drake. The standout player was Joe Hulme who managed to cut inside repeatedly, threatening United with an extra yard or two of speed over his marker. James also performed well, getting in more attacks on goal than usual. Smith, in goal for the Blades, had a particularly steady game and their forwards Barclay and Pickering played particularly well with their attacks only prevented by the work of Male who was described by The Times as having the "game of his life". United's attacks were mostly restricted by the Arsenal defence to long range shooting. The first half of the match finished at a 0–0 draw, with the attacks spread equally between the two teams.

The second half started off with Crayston briefly taking on the role of a forward, driving in a shot that Smith did well to save. Arsenal's forwards followed this with a flowing move from James, Hulme and Bastin, with the final move resulting in Bastin heading just wide of the post. Although play in the first half was relatively equal, in the second half Arsenal were the superior side, simply outclassing the Second Division Sheffield United. In the 74th minute a movement was started by James, who passed the ball to Bastin. Bastin dribbled the ball past Hooper before crossing the ball into the centre for Drake, who drove the ball into the roof of the net with his left foot. Moments after the goal United were on the attack, Barton broke down the right wing, crossing the ball in for Dodds who, finding his marker out of position, headed the ball against the bar. Dodds later said in an interview, "I was just about to direct the ball down into the net when a wee fellow called Wilf Copping went up behind me and, in striving to get to the ball, punched me in the back. This had the unfortunate effect of knocking my head backwards so the ball thudded against the crossbar instead of nestling itself in the back of the net. But for that, who knows, things might have turned out different." Arsenal won the game with a single goal, the match having been mostly full of positive play and relatively free of fouls, although Drake was penalised on five occasions for using his elbows too much.

=== Match details ===
25 April 1936
15:00 BST

Arsenal	1–0	Sheffield United
Drake 74'	Report

Wembley, London
Attendance: 93,384
Referee: Harry Nattrass (County Durham)

Arsenal	Sheffield United

GK	(Scotland) Alex Wilson
RB	(England) George Male
LB	(England) Eddie Hapgood
RH	(England) Jack Crayston
CH	(England) Herbie Roberts
LH	(England) Wilf Copping
OR	(England) Joe Hulme
IR	(England) Ray Bowden
CF	(England) Ted Drake
IL	(Scotland) Alex James (c)
OL	(England) Cliff Bastin
Manager:
(England) George Allison

GK	(England) Jack Smith
RB	(England) Harry Hooper (c)
LB	(England) Charlie Wilkinson
RH	(England) Ernest Jackson
CH	(England) Tom Johnson
LH	(Scotland) Archie McPherson
OR	(England) Harold Barton
IR	(England) Bobby Barclay
CF	(Scotland) Jock Dodds
IL	(England) Jack Pickering
OL	(England) Bertie Williams
Manager:
(England) Teddy Davison

Match rules

- 90 minutes.
- 30 minutes of extra-time if necessary.
- Replay if scores still level.

== Post-match ==
Arsenal returned to Brighton following the game to rest, where they had conducted their pre-match training. The victorious players' wives were each presented with a silver wristwatch. Neither club reported any injuries sustained during the match. This was not the last match of the season for Arsenal, who followed the final with a further three league matches in a week, including a game against their London rivals Chelsea. Their final match of the season was against Brentford in the London Challenge Cup on 4 May, when they won 4–2. Arsenal finished the season in sixth position in the First Division, having drawn 2–2 with Leeds United in their final match. Sheffield United finished the Second Division in third position, and they missed out on promotion by one place.

Sheffield United are yet to return to an FA Cup Final. The shirt worn by Alex James during the 1936 final is displayed in the Arsenal Museum. Jock Dodds, who died on 23 February 2007 aged 91, was the last surviving player from the final.
