= Bobby Davidson (footballer) =

Scottish footballer

Personal information
- Full name: Robert Trimming Davidson
- Date of birth: 27 April 1913
- Place of birth: Lochgelly, Scotland
- Date of death: October 1988 (aged 75)
- Place of death: Coventry, England
- Height: 5 ft 5 in (1.65 m)
- Position: Inside forward

Youth career
- Prinslaw United

Senior career*
Years	Team	Apps	(Gls)
- Bowhill Rovers
1930–1933	St Bernard's	60	(30)
1933–1935	St Johnstone	58	(28)
1935–1937	Arsenal	57	(13)
1937–1948	Coventry City	47	(9)
1948–1949	Hinckley Athletic		
1949–1950	Redditch Town		
1950–1951	Rugby Town		
Total		222	(80)

International career
1934	Scottish League XI	1	(0)
- * Club domestic league appearances and goals

Robert Trimming Davidson (27 April 1913 – October 1988) was a Scottish footballer who played as an inside forward for St Bernard's, St Johnstone, Arsenal and Coventry City.

== Career ==
Considered a player with great talent and potential – but a variable temperament – from an early age, Davidson made one appearance for the Scottish Football League XI in 1934 while with St Johnstone and scored the Perth club's 1000th Scottish Football League goal.

After moving to Arsenal towards the end of the 1934–35 season he quickly won the Football League title and was seen as a possible successor to Alex James. However, he suffered from injuries and fell out of favour at the North London club after the 1935 FA Charity Shield match and was not selected for the 1936 FA Cup Final victory, and although back in the picture for the next campaign, finished on the losing side again in the 1936 FA Charity Shield. He moved to Coventry City in exchange for Leslie Jones in November 1937.

Having lost what may have been his peak years as a player to World War II, in which he served in the British Army and made guest appearances for several clubs, Davidson played a small number of games for Coventry after the conflict ended, departing aged 35 in 1948. He later featured for local non-league sides Hinckley Athletic, Redditch Town and Rugby Town.
