= Harry Hooper (footballer, born 1910) =

English footballer and manager (1910–1970)

Personal information
- Full name: Harry Reed Hooper
- Date of birth: 16 December 1910
- Place of birth: Burnley, England
- Date of death: 24 March 1970 (aged 59)
- Place of death: Halifax, England
- Height: 5 ft 10 1/2 in (1.79 m)
- Position: Full-back

Youth career
- –1928: Nelson Tradesmen

Senior career*
| Years | Team | Apps | (Gls) |
| 1928–1930 | Nelson | 21 | (0) |
| 1930–1947 | Sheffield United | 269 | (10) |
| 1947–1950 | Hartlepools United | 66 | (4) |
| Total | | 356 | (14) |

Managerial career
- 1957–1962: Halifax Town
- * Club domestic league appearances and goals

Harry Reed Hooper (16 December 1910 – 24 March 1970) was an English professional footballer who played as a full-back. Born in Burnley, Lancashire, he started his career with Nelson before joining Sheffield United in 1930. During his time with United, he captained the side in the 1936 FA Cup Final. After 17 years with the club, he moved to Hartlepools United before retiring in 1950. Between 1957 and 1962, he was the manager of Halifax Town.

== Playing career ==
=== Nelson ===
He was playing for Nelson Tradesmen when he was spotted by Football League Third Division North side Nelson, who signed him as an amateur in October 1928. He made his senior debut on 20 October in the 0–4 defeat away at Carlisle United. Hooper was awarded a professional contract the following month, but found it difficult to break into the first-team. He returned to the starting line-up in place of Clem Rigg for the 2–3 loss to Darlington on 5 January 1929 and retained his place for the next ten matches. Hooper found his first-team opportunities even more limited in the 1929–30 season following the signing of Billy Fairhurst from Southport.

=== Sheffield United ===
After making eight further league appearances for Nelson, Hooper was signed by First Division side Sheffield United. He moved along with half-back Harry Tordoff for a combined transfer fee of £750. On his arrival at United Hooper he became a regular at left-back, but in 1933 he switched to right-back and became first choice in that position until 1939, missing very few games. Hooper went on to play for Sheffield United for 17 years, scoring 10 goals in 269 league matches for the club. Hooper was made captain in 1935 and captained the side as they lost 0–1 to Arsenal in the 1936 FA Cup Final. Suffering an injury towards the end of the 1938–39 season he missed a lengthy run of games for the first time. Following the outbreak of World War II he joined the Royal Army Ordnance Corps and rarely played for United again, although he did make guest appearances for Portsmouth, Hartlepools United and Huddersfield Town. Following the cessation of hostilities, Hooper did briefly return to United's first team during the 1945–46 season but drifted out of contention and played out the remainder of his time at Bramall Lane in United's reserves. He left United having played 300 times, scoring eleven goals.

=== Hartlepools United ===
In July 1947, Hooper signed for Hartlepools United on a permanent basis and went on to make 66 league appearances for them, scoring 4 goals.

== Coaching career ==
Hartlepools released Hooper at the end of the 1949–50 season, and appointed him to the role of assistant trainer and coach. He moved on to an assistant trainer post at West Ham United in November 1950. In October 1957, he was appointed manager of Halifax Town, and spent almost five seasons in charge of the club before leaving in April 1962.

== Personal life ==
Harry Hooper was born in the town of Burnley, Lancashire, on 16 December 1910. Before becoming a professional footballer, he trained as a tailor. Hooper was a heavy smoker and would famously have a cigarette at half-time while with Sheffield United. His smoking was such that goalkeeper Jack Smith was the only teammate that would room with him on away trips. Following his retirement from football he lived in Halifax, West Yorkshire, and died from lung cancer there on 24 March 1970, at the age of 59. His son, also named Harry, was also a footballer and represented four different league clubs.

== Honours ==
Sheffield United

- FA Cup runner-up: 1935–36
