= Bobby Barclay =

English footballer (1906–1969)

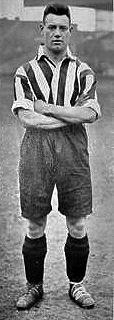

Personal information
- Full name: Robert Barclay
- Date of birth: 27 October 1906
- Place of birth: Scotswood, Newcastle upon Tyne, England
- Date of death: 13 July 1969 (aged 62)
- Place of death: Huddersfield, England
- Height: 5 ft 7 1/2 in (1.71 m)
- Position: Inside forward

Youth career
- Scotswood United Church
- Bell's Close Amateurs
- Allendale
- Scotswood

Senior career*
Years	Team	Apps	(Gls)
1928–1930	Derby County	61	(23)
1932–1937	Sheffield United	231	(67)
1937–1946	Huddersfield Town	74	(19)
1946–?	Hurst		
Total		366	(109)

International career
1932–1936	England	3	(2)
- * Club domestic league appearances and goals

Robert Barclay (27 October 1906 – 13 July 1969) was an English footballer who played as an inside forward. Born in Scotswood, Newcastle upon Tyne Barclay is best remembered for his time at Sheffield United for whom he played in the 1936 FA Cup Final, but also had spells for Derby County and Huddersfield Town. Barclay also represented England on three occasions, scoring two goals.

== Football career ==
=== Derby County ===
Barclay started his career with amateur clubs; Scotswood United Church, Bell's Close Amateurs, Allendale and finally Scotswood before signing for Derby County in 1928 where he became a protégé of George Jobey. He spent two seasons with The Rams scoring 23 league goals in 61 games.

=== Sheffield United ===
In 1931 Barclay signed for Sheffield United for £3,500. He was cool and methodical in his play, very clever, and was bought to lend inspiration to Jimmy Dunne in attack, although he also provided plenty of openings for the other attacking teammates (like inside-forward Jack Pickering). He remained a stalwart at Bramall Lane and was an important figure in the Blades FA Cup side of 1936, appearing in the final in which United lost 1–0 to Arsenal. Barclay scored 67 league goals for The Blades in 231 starts, although it has been said on numerous occasions that he given his apparent unselfishness in front of goal, he should have scored many more.

=== Huddersfield Town ===
In March 1937 Barclay was transferred to Huddersfield Town along with Eddie Boot for a combined fee of £7,000. He was a regular for Town in the following seasons and once again found himself on the losing side at Wembley as Huddersfield were beaten 1–0 by Preston North End in the 1938 FA Cup Final. With the outbreak of World War II the football league was suspended but Town retained Barclay's registration throughout. As was common in this period Barclay made wartime guest appearances for Barnsley, Bradford Park Avenue, Bradford City, York City, Crewe Alexandra, Oldham Athletic and back at his old club Sheffield United. With the war over Barclay was finally released by Huddersfield in 1946 having scored 19 goals from 74 league appearances.

== International career ==
Barclay's good form with Sheffield United meant it was no surprise when he was handed his first of 3 England international caps in 1932. He made his debut against Scotland on 9 April 1932 in a Home Championship aged 25 years. Scoring on his debut Barclay found the net again in England's next game later the same year; another Home Championship fixture, this time against Ireland. Despite this promising start he was overlooked until 1936 when he won his third and final cap in another Home Championship game against Scotland.

=== International goals ===
#	Date	Venue	Opponent	Result	Competition	Scored
1	9 April 1932	Wembley Stadium, London	Scotland	3–0	Home Championship	1
2	17 October 1932	Bloomfield Road, Blackpool	Ireland	1–0	Home Championship	1

== Honours ==
Sheffield United

- FA Cup runner-up: 1935–36

Huddersfield Town

- FA Cup runner-up: 1937–38

== Later career ==
Following his release by Huddersfield, Barclay played for Hurst in the Cheshire League before returning to Huddersfield Town to act as assistant trainer. He subsequently had a spell as a coach in the Netherlands.

== Bibliography ==
- A to Z Encyclopedia. Sheffield United matchday programme. 22 March 1986.
- Young, Percy A. (1962). Football in Sheffield. ISBN 0-9506272-4-0
- Clarebrough, Denis. (1989) Sheffield United F.C., The First 100 years. ISBN 0-9508588-1-1
- Clarebrough, Denis. From The Past, Sheffield United matchday programme, 26 December 1986.
