= Jack Pickering =

English footballer

Personal information
- Full name: John Pickering
- Date of birth: 18 December 1908
- Place of birth: High Green, Sheffield, England
- Date of death: 10 May 1977 (aged 68)
- Place of death: Bournemouth, England
- Height: 5 ft 10 1/2 in (1.79 m)
- Position: Inside left

Senior career*
Years	Team	Apps	(Gls)
1925–1948	Sheffield United	344	(102)

International career
1933	England	1	(0)
- * Club domestic league appearances and goals

John Pickering (18 December 1908 – 10 May 1977) was an English footballer who played for Sheffield United between 1925 and 1948. He played in the position of inside left.

== Life and career ==
Pickering learned his football at Barnsley Grammar School and Mortomley St. Saviours from where he came directly to Sheffield United at the age of 17, in 1925. He was a tall, long striding attacking player, and was instantly seen as a successor to Billy Gillespie at inside-forward. Pickering was a part-time player, first working as a bookmaker and then an accountant.

He was a clever manipulator of the ball and excelled at the long cross field pass which had been a feature of Sheffield United's play in the 1890s. He generally lay far back behind, directing his fellow forwards with discriminating passes.

Pickering became a regular first team player at the end of the 1920s as Gillespie's playing career wound down. His ball control was excellent as was his passing. He played a thoughtful studied game, simple in essence, but he was also a fast runner and began to score splendid goals with hard shots often from around the edge of the six-yard box.

Yet, the United matchday programme writer in October 1930 grumbled that Pickering did not put 'enough ginger' into his play and judged him as 'moody'.

He was chosen for the Football League side in 1932 and for the Rest against England in an international trial in March 1933. The Rest forward line played so well (winning 5-1) that they were all chosen to play Scotland at Hampden Park. Pickering received what turned out to be his only international cap for England in that match.

Pickering scored two goals in the FA Cup 5th round tie against Leeds United at Bramall Lane on 15 February 1936, in a match watched by a record crowd of 68,287.

He possessed a strong shot and played in 39 matches in season 1935-36, scoring 17 goals as Sheffield United reached the 1936 FA Cup Final. Pickering partnered striker Bobby Barclay in the final against Arsenal at Wembley Stadium, and both impressed with their stylish distribution and approach play. But it was not to be United's day and they lost the match 1–0.

In season 1938–39, Pickering was partnered with Jimmy Hagan in possibly one of United's most exciting teams of the 1900s. When World War II broke out, United were standing at the top of the First Division – the season was canceled after just three matches.

He played in wartime matches for Sheffield United, and made eleven appearances in the team which won the League North title in season 1945-46. The first post-war season saw him make just one appearance and that was in the Championship decider against Stoke City. Pickering scored United's second goal that was to take the title to Liverpool with United finishing sixth in Division One.

In a career that spanned 22 seasons, he made his final appearance for Sheffield United against Portsmouth at Bramall Lane on 1 January 1948 when he was 39 years old. Overall, he made 344 league appearances and scored 102 league goals, in a career exclusively with United.

Pickering had trained as an accountant, and he cut his formal links with the soccer world taking a hotel in Bournemouth. He died aged 68.

== Club statistics ==
Appearances and goals by club, season and competition
Club	Season	League			FA Cup		Other (Note: Appearance(s) in Sheffield & Hallamshire County Cup)		Total	
Club	Season	Division	Apps	Goals	Apps	Goals	Apps	Goals	Apps	Goals
Sheffield United	1926–27	Division One	1	0	0	0	0	0	1	0
Sheffield United	1927–28	Division One	2	0	0	0	0	0	2	0
Sheffield United	1928–29	Division One	10	4	0	0	0	0	10	4
Sheffield United	1929–30	Division One	38	14	2	0	2	2	42	16
Sheffield United	1930–31	Division One	23	4	1	0	0	0	24	4
Sheffield United	1931–32	Division One	34	10	2	1	0	0	36	11
Sheffield United	1932–33	Division One	39	13	2	0	1	0	42	13
Sheffield United	1933–34	Division One	28	12	0	0	2	1	30	13
Sheffield United	1934–35	Division Two	32	6	2	2	1	0	35	8
Sheffield United	1935–36	Division Two	35	14	4	3	2	1	41	18
Sheffield United	1936–37	Division Two	39	8	3	1	2	2	44	11
Sheffield United	1937–38	Division Two	37	11	3	1	0	0	40	12
Sheffield United	1938–39	Division Two	24	5	4	1	0	0	28	6
Sheffield United	1946–47	Division One	1	1	0	0	—		1	1
Sheffield United	1947–48	Division One	1	0	0	0	0	0	1	0
Career total			344	102	23	9	10	6	377	117

== Honours ==
Sheffield United

- FA Cup runner-up: 1935–36
