= Harry Nattrass =

English football referee

- Born: 1898; Seaham, County Durham, England

Domestic
| Years | League | Role |
| 1933–1947 | Football League | Referee |

Harry Nattrass (born 1898, date of death unknown) was an English football referee who hailed from Seaham, in County Durham.

== Career as a referee ==
He was a Football League referee from 1933 until the 1946–47 season, having actively participated as a match official during the Second World War. Perhaps his most famous match was the one between Scotland and Germany at Ibrox on Wednesday, 14 October 1936. That international signalled the arrival in Scotland of the team that represented the Nazi regime in Germany and there was concern that the game would be precipitated by demonstrations.

Nattrass' performance in the 1936 FA Cup Final between Sheffield United and Arsenal at Wembley went without comment. The match was won by the latter, courtesy of a Ted Drake goal.

== As a scout for Newcastle ==
After finishing with his refereeing career Nattrass was employed by Newcastle United as a scout in the 1960s and 1970s and he 'discovered' Irving Nattrass, who was not related though sharing the same surname.

| Preceded by Bert Fogg | FA Cup Final Referee; 1936 | Succeeded by R. G. Rudd |
