= George Swindin =

English footballer (1914–2005)

Personal information
- Full name: George Hedley Swindin
- Date of birth: 4 December 1914
- Place of birth: Campsall, Yorkshire, England
- Date of death: 26 October 2005 (aged 90)
- Place of death: Kettering, Northamptonshire, England
- Position: Goalkeeper

Youth career
- Rotherham YMCA
- New Stubbin Colliery

Senior career*
Years	Team	Apps	(Gls)
193?–1934	Rotherham United	0	(0)
1934–1936	Bradford City	26	(0)
1936–1954	Arsenal	297	(0)
1954–1955	Peterborough United	18	(0)

Managerial career
- 1954–1958: Peterborough United
- 1958–1962: Arsenal
- 1962: Norwich City
- 1962–1964: Cardiff City
- 1965: Kettering Town
- 1969–1970: Corby Town
- * Club domestic league appearances and goals

George Hedley Swindin (4 December 1914 – 26 October 2005) was an English football player and manager.

Playing as a goalkeeper, Swindin made more than 300 appearances in the Football League with Bradford City and Arsenal, where his 18-year career was interrupted by the Second World War. As manager, he led Peterborough United to three Midland League titles before spending a less successful spell with Arsenal. He also managed Norwich City and Cardiff City of the Football League and Kettering Town and Corby Town in non-league football.

== Playing career ==
Swindin was born in Campsall in the West Riding of Yorkshire, and attended South Grove Central School in Rotherham. He played for England against The Rest as a final trial for a schoolboy international against Wales in 1929, but was not selected. He played as an amateur for various local clubs, including for Rotherham United's reserve team in the Midland League, before turning professional in 1934 with Bradford City. Swindin established himself in the first team towards the end of the 1933–34 season, but a serious knee injury sustained in the last match of that campaign caused ongoing problems that disrupted his second season and eventually required surgery to remove cartilage. He played 26 Second Division matches for Bradford City, before being signed by Arsenal in April 1936 for £4,000.

He made his debut against Brentford on 3 September 1936, and played 19 games in his first season. His time at Arsenal was at first characterised by nervous and erratic displays, and he shared the goalkeeping spot with Alex Wilson and Frank Boulton. However, he played 17 league matches in 1937–38, more than either of his rivals, as Arsenal won the League title.

The Second World War interrupted his career somewhat, but Swindin continued to play through the war for Arsenal, while serving as a Physical Training Instructor in the Army. He made wartime guest appearances for clubs including Leeds United, while serving as a policeman in the area, Clapton Orient, and in 1945, Southampton.

By the time first-class football had resumed after the war, he became Arsenal's undisputed No. 1, and stayed there for the next few seasons. He had put his erraticness behind him, and he was a commanding keeper who was especially known for his aerial ability and assured handling of crosses, as well as his strong physical resilience. He won his second League title in 1947–48. After the arrival of Ted Platt in 1950, Swindin had to share the goalkeeper's spot for 1949–50, but played in both the 1950 and 1952 FA Cup Finals; Arsenal won the former against Liverpool, but lost to Newcastle United in the latter.

By 1952–53, Swindin was beginning to show his age, and another talented keeper, the Welshman Jack Kelsey, had taken his first-team place. Nevertheless, Swindin played 14 matches that season as Arsenal won the title again, giving him his third Championship winner's medal. Despite his excellent form for Arsenal, he was never capped by England at senior level, with Walter Winterbottom preferring Frank Swift and Bert Williams. In all, he played 297 first-class matches (not including wartime games) for the Gunners.

== Managerial career ==
Swindin moved to Midland League side Peterborough United as player-manager in 1954. He led them to three consecutive Midland League titles, from 1955–56 to 1957–58, and reached the Fourth Round of the FA Cup in 1956–57. Peterborough won the title twice more after Swindin left, enough to win election to the Football League in 1960. His contribution was recognised by his induction into the club's Hall of Fame.

In the meantime, Swindin had returned to Arsenal in 1958 as manager, and his side initially started strongly, finishing third in 1958–59. However, the team soon flagged and spent the next three seasons in mid-table. Despite signing players such as George Eastham and Tommy Docherty, Swindin was unable to bring any silverware to the club, while the club's rivals Tottenham Hotspur won the Double in 1960–61.

In March 1962, Arsenal chairman Denis Hill-Wood confirmed that Swindin's contract would not be renewed at the end of the season. He then became manager of Norwich City for five months, and then Cardiff City from late 1962 to 1964. At Cardiff, he signed John Charles from Roma, but after a bright start Cardiff soon faded and he resigned after the team were relegated to the Second Division. After that, he had spells as manager of Kettering Town and Corby Town before leaving the game for good.

== Final years ==
After leaving football, Swindin first owned a garage in Corby, before emigrating to Spain, where he lived for several years before returning to his homeland. In the later years of his life he suffered from Alzheimer's disease. He died at Kettering in October 2005 at the age of 90.

== Honours ==
=== Player ===
Arsenal

- Football League First Division: 1937–38, 1947–48, 1952–53
- FA Cup: 1949–50; runner-up: 1951–52
- FA Charity Shield: 1938, 1948

=== Managerial ===
Peterborough United

- Midland League: 1955–56, 1956–57, 1957–58

=== Individual ===
- Peterborough United Hall of Fame: 2013
