= Shouldham =

Village in Norfolk, England

Coordinates: 52.650979°N 0.47945°E

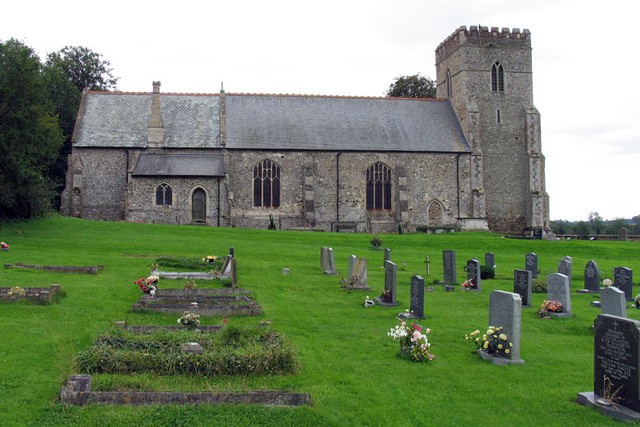
- All Saints, Shouldham

- Location within Norfolk
- Area: 16.04 km^{2} (6.19 sq mi)
- Population: 605 (2011)
  - Density: 38/km^{2} (98/sq mi)
- OS grid reference: TF678087
- Civil parish: Shouldham
- District: King's Lynn and West Norfolk
- Shire county: Norfolk
- Region: East
- Country: England
- Sovereign state: United Kingdom
- Post town: KING'S LYNN
- Postcode district: PE33
- Police: Norfolk
- Fire: Norfolk
- Ambulance: East of England

Shouldham is a village and civil parish in the English county of Norfolk. It covers an area of 16.04 km^{2} (6.19 sq mi) and had a population of 608 in 246 households at the 2001 census, the population reducing slightly to 605 at the 2011 census. It also contains a church (pictured) and a primary school (St Martins at Shouldham).

The villages name means 'homestead/village with an obligation'.

Shouldham is a parish of the Kings Lynn and West Norfolk district council, which is responsible for the most local services. Norfolk County Council is responsible for roads, some schools, and social services. For Westminster elections the parish forms part of the South West Norfolk constituency.
