= Joe Hulme =

English footballer and cricketer (1904–1991)

Personal information
- Full name: Joseph Harold Anthony Hulme
- Date of birth: 26 August 1904
- Place of birth: Stafford, Staffordshire, England
- Date of death: 27 September 1991 (aged 87)
- Place of death: Winchmore Hill, England
- Height: 5 ft 8 in (1.73 m)
- Position: Right winger

Youth career
- Stafford YMCA

Senior career*
Years	Team	Apps	(Gls)
1922–1924	York City	28	(3)
1924–1926	Blackburn Rovers	73	(6)
1926–1938	Arsenal	333	(107)
1938	Huddersfield Town	8	(0)
Total		442	(116)

International career
1927–1933	England	9	(4)

Managerial career
- 1946–1949: Tottenham Hotspur
- * Club domestic league appearances and goals

Joseph Harold Anthony Hulme (26 August 1904 – 27 September 1991) was an English footballer and cricketer.

== Football career ==
Born in Stafford, Hulme usually played as a right-winger. Hulme played for Stafford YMCA before starting his career in non-League football with Midland League side York City in October 1922, before moving to Blackburn Rovers in February 1924 for a fee of £250. He spent two years at Ewood Park and made 74 league appearances, scoring six goals. He moved to Arsenal in 1926, becoming one of Herbert Chapman's first major signings; known for his pace and ball control, Hulme spent twelve years at Arsenal and became part of the great Arsenal side of the 1930s.

Hulme made his Arsenal debut on 6 February 1926 away to Leeds United, and remained a regular for the rest of that season. That led him to be picked for the Football League XI that season, and the following season, 1926–27, he made his full England debut, against Scotland at Hampden Park on 2 April 1927. In all he would win nine caps for England, between 1927 and 1933. That same season he also played in his first FA Cup final, against Cardiff City, which Arsenal lost 1–0 after an error by goalkeeper Dan Lewis. Hulme played in Arsenal's 2–1 victory over Sheffield Wednesday in the Charity Shield at Stamford Bridge in October 1930.

Hulme remained first choice on the right-wing at Arsenal up until the 1932–33 season, combining with Cliff Bastin (who joined Arsenal in 1929) to form a pair of highly paced wingers supported passes from an attacking central midfielder, in the shape of Alex James. Hulme and Bastin were both prolific scorers for Arsenal, with Hulme hitting 18 goals in 1931–32 and 20 (including hat-tricks against Sunderland and Middlesbrough) the season after that. In the meantime Hulme and Arsenal had started winning trophies, taking the FA Cup in 1929–30, and followed it up with a pair of First Division titles in 1930–31 and 1932–33.

Injuries robbed Hulme of another title-winning medal, as he only made eight appearances (but still scored five times) in Arsenal's 1933–34 title-winning season. He returned to the Arsenal side the following season, 1934–35, and won his third league winners' medal with 16 appearances, although by now injury and losses of form meant he was not an automatic first choice, sharing duties with Pat Beasley and Alf Kirchen. In 1935–36 Hulme played 28 times in league and cup won his final honour with Arsenal, a second FA Cup medal after Arsenal beat Sheffield United 1–0 in the final, making him the only player to have played in all of Arsenal's first four cup finals.

Hulme spent his final two seasons at Arsenal (1936–37 and 1937–38) as a bit-part player, making just ten appearances in one and a half years. His final appearance came against Liverpool on 18 December 1937. In all he scored 125 goals in 374 appearances for the Gunners, making him the club's eighth-top scorer of all time. Hulme left Arsenal for Huddersfield in January 1938, where he saw out the rest of his career, picking up an FA Cup runners-up medal in the 1937–38 season before retiring from football at the end of that season. Arsenal also won the old First Division in 1937–38 but he only made seven league appearances all season.

Hulme was also a fine all-round cricketer, playing 225 times for Middlesex between 1929 and 1939 as an aggressive middle-order batsman and medium-fast bowler. Capped by Middlesex in 1930, he scored his first century that year, 117 against Warwickshire at Edgbaston. He first passed 1,000 runs for the season in 1932, and in 1934 made his highest aggregate, 1,258 runs at 34.94, including four hundreds. He was an excellent fielder in the deep, and a good runner between the wickets. In 225 matches he made 8,103 runs at an average of 26.56, the highest of his twelve hundreds being 143 against Gloucestershire at Bristol. His useful right-arm medium-pace bowling brought him 89 wickets at 36.40, with a career best of 4 for 44, and he held 110 catches.

After World War II, which he spent working as a policeman, Hulme became manager of Arsenal's fiercest rivals, Tottenham Hotspur from 1945 to 1949. He achieved little actual success at the time, but he did lay the foundations for their championship-winning side of 1950–51. After that, Hulme left football altogether, to become a successful journalist. He died at the age of 87, in 1991.

== Personal life ==
Born at Stafford as the third of four children, Hulme married Minnie Bennett at Fylde, Lancashire, in June 1927. Their twin daughters, Josephine and Mary, were born the following year.

== Honours ==
=== As a player ===
Arsenal

- Football League First Division: 1930–31, 1932–33, 1934–35
- FA Cup: 1929–30, 1935–36; runner-up: 1926–27, 1931–32
- FA Charity Shield: 1930, 1931

Huddersfield Town

- FA Cup runner-up: 1937–38
