= Phil Kelso =

Scottish football manager (1871–1935)

Personal information
- Full name: Philip Wade Kelso
- Date of birth: 26 May 1871
- Place of birth: Largs, Scotland
- Date of death: 13 February 1935 (aged 63)
- Place of death: London, England

Managerial career
- Years: Team
- 1903–1904: Hibernian
- 1904–1908: Woolwich Arsenal
- 1909–1924: Fulham

Phil Wade Kelso (26 May 1871 – 13 February 1935) was a Scottish football manager.

== Career ==
Kelso was born in Largs on the Firth of Clyde, Scotland. He was manager of Hibernian for one season, before taking over as manager of Woolwich Arsenal shortly before their promotion in 1904. He managed the club for four years, during which time he took the side to the FA Cup semi-finals two seasons in a row; however, his best in the league was seventh (in 1906-07).

With the club starting to run into financial trouble and with results declining, Kelso resigned in 1908 to return to Scotland to manage a hotel; but was tempted back down south to become manager of Fulham in 1909. He stayed with the Cottagers for 15 years, making him their longest-serving manager.

== Personal life ==
Kelso worked at the Royal Arsenal during the First World War. After retiring from football he managed pubs in the Hammersmith area and was chairman of the Football League Managers and Secretaries Association. Kelso died in London, in 1935, aged 63. He is buried in East Sheen.
