= 1938 FA Charity Shield =

- Event: FA Charity Shield
Arsenal	Preston North End
2	1
- Date: 26 September 1938
- Venue: Highbury, London
- Referee: G.W. Jones (Notts)
- Attendance: 7,233

The 1938 FA Charity Shield was the 25th Charity Shield, an annual English football match played between the winners of the previous season's Football League and FA Cup competitions. The match, held at Highbury on 26 September 1938, was contested by Arsenal, champions of the 1937–38 Football League and Preston North End, who beat Huddersfield Town in the final of the 1937–38 FA Cup. Arsenal won the match 2–1, both of their goals scored by Ted Drake. The competition would not be held again until 1948, due to the Second World War.

== Background ==
The FA Charity Shield was founded in 1908 as a successor to the Sheriff of London Charity Shield. It was a contest between the respective champions of the Football League and Southern League, and then by 1913 teams of amateur and professional players. In 1921, it was played by the Football League champions and FA Cup winners for the first time.

== Match ==
=== Details ===
26 September 1938
17:30 BST

Arsenal	2–1	Preston North End
Drake (?); Drake (?)		Beattie (?)

Arsenal Stadium, London
Attendance: 7,233
Referee: G.W. Jones (Notts)

Arsenal	Preston North End

1	(England) George Swindin
2	(England) George Male
3	(England) Leslie Compton
4	(England) Jack Crayston
5	(England) Bernard Joy
6	(England) Wilf Copping
7	(England) Alf Kirchen
8	(Wales) Leslie Jones
9	(England) Ted Drake
10	(Wales) Bryn Jones
11	(Wales) Horace Cumner
Manager: (England) George Allison

1	(England) George Holdcroft
2	(England) Frank Gallimore
3	(Scotland) Andy Beattie
4	(Scotland) Bill Shankly
5	(England) Bob Batey
6	(Scotland) Jimmy Milne
7	(Scotland) Terry McGibbons
8	(Scotland) George Mutch
9	(Scotland) Jimmy Dougal
10	(Scotland) Bobby Beattie
11	(Scotland) Bud Maxwell
Manager: Selection Committee
