= Gillespie Road =

Road in London

Coordinates: 51°33′33″N 0°06′12″W

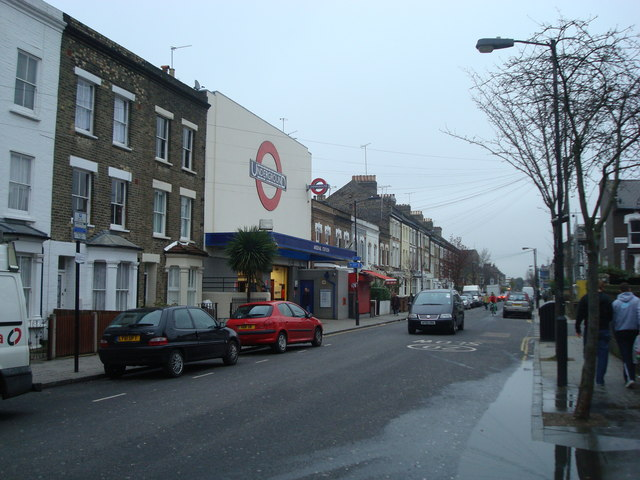
View towards Arsenal tube station, Gillespie Road, N5

Gillespie Road is a road in Highbury, north London, that runs east–west along the north side of Arsenal Stadium. Arsenal Underground station was originally named Gillespie Road, before being given its current name in 1932 following pressure from the club and its then manager Herbert Chapman. The original name is still displayed on the original Edwardian platform tiling.
