= Frank Boulton (footballer) =

English footballer

Personal information
- Full name: Frank Preece Boulton
- Date of birth: 12 August 1917
- Place of birth: Chipping Sodbury, England
- Date of death: 12 June 1987 (aged 69)
- Place of death: Swindon, England
- Position: Goalkeeper

Senior career*
Years	Team	Apps	(Gls)
–1936	Bath City		
1936–1938	Arsenal	36	(0)
1938–1946	Derby County	39	(0)
1946–1950	Swindon Town	97	(0)
1950–?	Crystal Palace	0	(0)
- * Club domestic league appearances and goals

Frank Preece Boulton (12 August 1917 – 12 June 1987) was an English footballer who played as a goalkeeper in the Football League for Arsenal, Derby County and Swindon Town.

Boulton started his career at Bath City, joining Arsenal age 19. He joined Derby County in August 1938 and made 39 League appearances either side of World War II. He joined Swindon Town in 1946, where he shared a house with his former Arsenal teammate Albert Young. As a matter of interest, Frank Boulton's first cousin, Arthur H Jones, was in the first Welsh Rugby side to win at Twickenham in 1933.
