= 1930 FA Charity Shield =

Arsenal	Sheffield Wednesday
2	1
- Date: 8 October 1930
- Venue: Stamford Bridge, London
- Attendance: 18,000

The 1930 FA Charity Shield was the 17th FA Charity Shield, an annual football match. It was played between Arsenal (1929–30 FA Cup winners) and Sheffield Wednesday (1929–30 Football League champions) at Stamford Bridge in London on 8 October 1930. Arsenal won the match 2–1.

== Match details ==
Arsenal took the lead through Hulme, and doubled their advantage before half-time when Jack scored. Sheffield Wednesday scored a consolation goal when Burgess converted a penalty awarded for a Jack handball, and the match ended 2–1.

Arsenal
Sheffield Wednesday

GK	(Netherlands) Gerrit Keizer
RB	(England) Tom Parker (c)
LB	(England) Eddie Hapgood
RH	(England) Bill Seddon
CH	(England) Herbie Roberts
LH	(Wales) Bob John
OR	(England) Joe Hulme
IR	(England) Jimmy Brain
CF	(England) Jack Lambert
IL	(England) David Jack
OL	(England) Cliff Bastin
Manager:
Herbert Chapman

GK	(England) Jack Brown
RB	(Scotland) Tommy Walker
LB	(England) Ernie Blenkinsop
RH	(England) Alfred Strange
CH	(England) Tony Leach (c)
LH	(England) Charlie Wilson
OR	(England) Mark Hooper
IR	(England) Jimmy Seed
CF	(England) Jack Ball
IL	(England) Harry Burgess
OL	(England) Ellis Rimmer
Manager:
Robert Brown

== Match ==
Arsenal won 2–1 with goals from Joe Hulme and David Jack. Harry Burgess scored a penalty for Sheffield Wednesday.
