= Jack Smith (footballer, born 1910) =

English footballer (1910–1986)

Personal information
- Full name: John Clayton Smith
- Date of birth: 15 September 1910
- Place of birth: Stocksbridge, West Riding of Yorkshire, England
- Date of death: 1986 (aged 75–76)
- Height: 5 ft 10 1/2 in (1.79 m)
- Position: Goalkeeper

Senior career*
Years	Team	Apps	(Gls)
1928–1929	Bolsterstone		
1929–1930	Worksop Town		
1930–1949	Sheffield United	347	(0)
- * Club domestic league appearances and goals

John Clayton Smith (15 September 1910 – 1986) was a footballer who played 347 league matches for Sheffield United between 1931 and 1949 as a goalkeeper.

He began by playing outfield for Bolsterstone FC, and first played in goal when replacing an injured team-mate. After an excellent performance, he remained as goalkeeper for the rest of the season, attracting the interest of both Sheffield clubs. He signed amateur forms with Sheffield Wednesday who loaned him to Worksop Town, but it was United who signed him as a professional after a couple of trial games in the Central League. Jack became one of the Blades most popular players, always remembered for his cheerful grin. Not for nothing he was nicknamed Smiler.

Between December 1935 and October 1947, he made 203 consecutive league appearances for United. Smith played for Sheffield United for 19 years, and in the final match of the 1948–49 season – a County Cup match against Barnsley – he was chaired from the field.

This was to have been his last appearance for the Blades, but he was forced out of retirement the following season for two matches due to an injury crisis. His final game was away at Grimsby Town in the Second Division on 24 September 1949, aged 39.

== Career statistics ==
Appearances and goals by club, season and competition
Club	Season	League			FA Cup		Other (Note: Appearance(s) in Sheffield & Hallamshire County Cup)		Total	
Club	Season	Division	Apps	Goals	Apps	Goals	Apps	Goals	Apps	Goals
Sheffield United	1930–31	First Division	7	0	0	0	1	0	8	0
Sheffield United	1931–32	First Division	21	0	2	0	0	0	23	0
Sheffield United	1932–33	First Division	32	0	0	0	0	0	32	0
Sheffield United	1933–34	First Division	31	0	1	0	0	0	32	0
Sheffield United	1934–35	Second Division	1	0	0	0	0	0	1	0
Sheffield United	1935–36	Second Division	35	0	8	0	2	0	45	0
Sheffield United	1936–37	Second Division	42	0	3	0	2	0	47	0
Sheffield United	1937–38	Second Division	42	0	3	0	1	0	46	0
Sheffield United	1938–39	Second Division	42	0	4	0	2	0	48	0
Sheffield United	1945–46	—			3	0	—		3	0
Sheffield United	1946–47	First Division	42	0	4	0	—		46	0
Sheffield United	1947–48	First Division	27	0	1	0	0	0	28	0
Sheffield United	1948–49	First Division	23	0	2	0	1	0	26	0
Sheffield United	1949–50	Second Division	2	0	0	0	0	0	2	0
Career total			347	0	31	0	9	0	387	0

== Baseball ==
Smith also played baseball for Sheffield Dons in their inaugural season in the semi-professional Yorkshire Baseball League, 1936. He competed successfully with several American and Canadian players. Smith played a number of positions but was most accomplished as keeper of first base. Smith also represented Yorkshire at baseball.

== Honours ==
Sheffield United

- FA Cup runner-up: 1935–36
