= Herbie Roberts =

English footballer

Personal information
- Full name: Herbert Roberts
- Date of birth: 19 February 1905
- Place of birth: Oswestry, Shropshire, England
- Date of death: 19 June 1944 (aged 39)
- Place of death: London, England
- Position: Centre half

Senior career*
Years	Team	Apps	(Gls)
1922–1926	Oswestry Town		
1926–1937	Arsenal	297	(4)

International career
1931	England	1	(0)
- * Club domestic league appearances and goals

Herbert Roberts (19 February 1905 – 19 June 1944) was an English footballer.

== Playing career ==
Born in Oswestry, Shropshire, Roberts first played as an amateur for his local club Oswestry Town, whilst working as a policeman. A tall, but quiet and unassuming right half, he was signed by Herbert Chapman's Arsenal in December 1926 for £200 and turned professional. He made his debut against Aston Villa on 18 April 1927, although he was not a regular in his first two seasons at the club, playing just five games.

Roberts' time came when Chapman converted him to a centre half, and he replaced Jack Butler in that position. In the new "WM" formation that Chapman and Arsenal captain Charlie Buchan pioneered, Roberts served as the tall "stopper" centre half in the middle of defence; at the time this was a new tactic, created in response to the 1925 relaxation of the offside law, but soon became a ubiquitous position in English football. Nevertheless, at the time Roberts was often abused and pilloried by opposition fans for what they saw as overly negative play.

By 1928–29, Roberts was featuring more regularly for Arsenal; however, he missed the 1929–30 FA Cup final with an injury. He played in Arsenal's 2–1 victory over Sheffield Wednesday in the Charity Shield at Stamford Bridge in October 1930. However, from the 1930–31 season Roberts was the undisputed first-choice centre-half at the club, making over 30 appearances for each season up until 1936–37. During this time, he won four First Division titles, and finally picked up an FA Cup medal in 1935–36 (having also played in the side that lost the 1931–32 final). He also won a second FA Charity Shield in 1931. During this period he won a single cap for England, against Scotland on 28 March 1931.

Roberts' long and successful career with Arsenal came to a sudden end early on in the 1937–38 season, when he broke his leg in a match against Middlesbrough and was subsequently forced to retire. Arsenal won the First Division title for a fifth time that season, but Roberts had only played 13 matches that season, one short of the minimum required for a medal at the time. In all he played 335 matches for Arsenal, scoring 5 goals.

Upon retiring he worked as a trainer to Arsenal's reserve side. When World War II broke out, Roberts joined the Royal Fusiliers, serving as a lieutenant. He died whilst on duty at the age of 39 from erysipelas, and was buried at Southgate Cemetery, north London; he was one of the 9 Arsenal players to perish serving in the war.

== Honours ==
Arsenal

- FA Cup: 1935–36; runner-up: 1931–32

== See also ==
- List of footballers killed during World War II

== External sources ==
- Arsenal.com, historic players, Herbie Roberts
