= Bernard Joy =

English footballer and journalist

Bernard Joy OBE

Personal information
- Full name: Bernard Joy
- Date of birth: 29 October 1911
- Place of birth: Fulham, London, England
- Date of death: 18 July 1984 (aged 72)
- Place of death: Kenton, London, England
- Position: Centre half

Senior career*
Years	Team	Apps	(Gls)
1931–1948	Casuals	84	(5)
1931-33	→ Southend United	0	(0)
1933–1936	Corinthians	29	(0)
1933–1934	→ Fulham	1	(0)
1935–1947	Arsenal	86	(0)
1940	→ Southampton	1	(0)
1940–1941	→ West Ham United	2	(0)

International career
1934-1937	England Amateurs	10	(0)
1936	England	1	(0)
	Great Britain	2	(2)
- * Club domestic league appearances and goals

Bernard Joy OBE (29 October 1911 – 18 July 1984) was an English footballer and journalist who played as a centre-half. He is notable for being the last amateur player to play for the England national team.

== Biography ==
Joy was born in Fulham, London and educated at Cardinal Vaughan Memorial School. He studied at the University of London, playing in his spare time for the university football side at centre half. After graduating, he played for Casuals, where he eventually became club captain. He also won ten caps for the England amateur team and was captain of the Great Britain football side at the 1936 Olympics in Berlin where they played China and Poland. Bernard was father to Christopher Margaret and Karen Joy.

While still registered as a Casuals player, Joy also played for several other clubs. He played 29 games for Corinthians between December 1933 and October 1936 including on Corinthian's Easter Tours of France (1934) and Germany (9-14 April 1936) and in Denmark (26 April 1936) for a game to celebrate KB Copenhagen's 60th Anniversary. This last game was between playing for Casuals in the FA Amateur Cup Final (18 April) and a Final Replay (2 May) that was necessary before overcoming Ilford. In the summer of 1937 he went on a tour of New Zealand, Australia and Ceylon with an FA Amateur X1. The tour lasted 10 weeks and the FA Amateur X1 played 22 games including playing Australia three times and New Zealand twice but these games not being recognised as amateur internationals. As an amateur, Joy played for professional clubs Southend United (1931–33) and Fulham (1933–34). In May 1935 he joined Arsenal, then First Division champions. Joy mainly played as a reserve, only playing two games in his first season – he did not make his debut for Arsenal until 1 April 1936 against Bolton Wanderers. Arsenal won the FA Cup that season but Joy played no part in the final.

However, he did gain recognition at international level soon after, when on 9 May 1936, he played for England in their 3–2 loss against Belgium, making him the last amateur to play for the national side; given the gulf in quality between the professional and amateur games in the modern day, it is exceedingly unlikely Joy's record will ever be taken by another player. Although Joy was playing for Arsenal at the time, he was still registered as a Casuals player and he is recorded in the England history books as playing for them at the time, not Arsenal.

Joy continued to play for Arsenal, mainly deputising for the Gunners' established centre-half Herbie Roberts. Roberts suffered a broken leg in October 1937 and Joy took his place in the side for the remainder of the 1937–38 season, winning a First Division winners' medal, and then, with Roberts having retired from the game, on through the 1938–39 season (earning a 1938 Charity Shield winners' medal in the process).

With the advent of World War II, Joy signed up to join the Royal Air Force where he was an PE instructor, though he still turned out for Arsenal (playing over 200 wartime matches) and won an unofficial wartime England cap. In June 1940, he was one of five Arsenal players who guested for Southampton in a victory over Fulham at Craven Cottage. He also appeared as a guest player for West Ham United later in World War II making two appearances.

When peace broke out and first-class football resumed, he played the first half of the 1946-47 season before deciding that his age (35) was counting against him; he retired from top-flight football in December 1946, though he carried on playing for the now merged Corinthians and Casuals team until 1948. In all, he played 95 first-class (i.e. non-wartime) matches for Arsenal, though he never scored a goal.

Before the war Joy was a teacher, but afterwards he decided not to return to the profession and moved into journalism. Joy began his career in journalism as a football writer on The Star, one of three London evening papers published in the 1940s. He later moved to the Evening Standard and the Sunday Express as football and lawn tennis correspondent until retirement in 1976. He also wrote one of the first histories of Arsenal Football Club, Forward, Arsenal! (1952), and several other football books.

Joy was appointed an Officer of the Order of the British Empire (OBE) in the 1977 Silver Jubilee and Birthday Honours.

He died in 1984, aged 72 of cancer. He often held dinner parties at his house in Osterley which many footballing celebrities would attend.

== Honours ==
Arsenal

- First Division: 1937–38
- FA Charity Shield: 1938

Casuals

- FA Amateur Cup: 1936

== Bibliography ==
- Harris, Jeff (1995). Hogg, Tony (ed.). Arsenal Who's Who. Independent UK Sports. ISBN 1-899429-03-4.
