= George Allison =

English football journalist, broadcaster and manager (1883–1957)

- Allison in 1936

Personal information
- Full name: George Frederick Allison
- Date of birth: 24 October 1883
- Place of birth: Hurworth-on-Tees, County Durham, England
- Date of death: 13 March 1957 (aged 73)
- Place of death: London, England

Managerial career
- Years: Team
- 1934–1947: Arsenal

George Frederick Allison (24 October 1883 – 13 March 1957) was an English football journalist, broadcaster and manager. He was the BBC's first sports commentator and Arsenal's second longest serving manager.

== Journalism career ==
Allison was born in Hurworth-on-Tees, County Durham, and attended Holy Trinity School in Stockton. He started out as a judge's secretary in his native North East, while playing for a local amateur team in Stockton-on-Tees. Allison ran a sideline in writing about his own team's exploits, and he was eventually convinced by his editor to become a full-time journalist. A year in Devonport aside, Allison spent most of his time in the Cleveland and Middlesbrough areas, and was briefly assistant to the secretary-manager of Middlesbrough F.C.

Allison moved to London in 1906, as the sports representative of the Hulton group of newspapers. Four years later he became greyhound correspondent for the Sporting Life and began to write Gunners' Mate in Arsenal's matchday programmes. After a chance encounter with Lord Kitchener before the 1911 coronation of King George V, Allison became London correspondent for the New York Post and a year later joined the staff of William Randolph Hearst, remaining in this post until 1934.

During World War I Allison worked for the War Office and the Admiralty, producing propaganda and later joined the Royal Flying Corps (later renamed the Royal Air Force). After the war Allison also moved into broadcasting, joining the BBC and becoming the first person to commentate on the radio on events such as the Derby and the Grand National (with the BBC's racing correspondent Meyrick Good), as well as the annual England v. Scotland international, and the FA Cup Final in 1927, between Cardiff City and Arsenal. By this time, he had already formed a strong association with the latter club.

== Football career ==
Having been a keen footballer in his youth (although he failed to make the grade as a professional, the best being a trial with Shildon), after his move to London in 1906, Allison soon became associated with Woolwich Arsenal. He became the club's programme editor and continued his association with the team after they moved to Highbury and renamed themselves "Arsenal". He became a member of the club's board of directors soon after the end of the First World War; he was at first club secretary and then managing director.

After the sudden death of legendary Arsenal boss Herbert Chapman earlier in January 1934, Allison was appointed Chapman's full-time successor in the summer of that year. Under Chapman and caretaker manager Joe Shaw, Arsenal had already won the League Championship twice in a row, in 1932–33 and 1933–34, and Allison made it a hat-trick, winning a third successive title in 1934–35. He also won the FA Cup in 1935–36 and the League again in 1937–38. In 1938, Allison set a world transfer record when he bought Bryn Jones from Wolverhampton for £14,000.

Allison famously appeared in a 1939 film set at Highbury, The Arsenal Stadium Mystery, where he had a speaking part as himself. Amongst his lines included one uttered at half time: "It's one-nil to the Arsenal. That's the way we like it.", a line of which helped foster and create the club's famous one-nil to the Arsenal chant.

Allison took a hands-off approach to managing, unlike his predecessor Chapman; Joe Shaw and Tom Whittaker took charge of training and squad discipline, while Allison concentrated on transfer policy and the club's relationship with the media. Arsenal player Bernard Joy later recounted: "[He was] tactful, friendly and good-hearted. But he fell short in his handling of footballers and lacked the professional's deep knowledge of the game". Allison's proponents have cited the trophies won under his reign, though by the end of the 1930s Arsenal were no longer the all-conquering team that they had once been. Allison was unable to replace many of the stars from the first half of the decade, especially Alex James.

With the advent of the Second World War, official competition in England was suspended. Allison continued to manage Arsenal in the Wartime League, going unpaid to do so. After hostilities had ended, many of the players that had made Arsenal a success (such as Cliff Bastin and Ted Drake) had retired from playing. Arsenal finished a disappointing 13th in 1946–47, and Allison, by now in his mid-sixties and tiring of managerial life, decided to step down and retire from the game. He died in 1957 after several years of illness.

== Personal life ==
Allison married Ethel Swordy in 1912.

== Honours ==
=== Managerial ===
Arsenal

- First Division: 1935, 1938
- FA Charity Shield: 1934, 1938
- FA Cup: 1936

=== Individual ===
- French Medal of Physical Culture

== See also ==
- List of English football championship winning managers
