= George Male =

English footballer (1910–1998)

Personal information
- Full name: Charles George Male
- Date of birth: 8 May 1910
- Place of birth: West Ham, Essex, England
- Date of death: 19 February 1998 (aged 87)
- Height: 5 ft 11 1/2 in (1.82 m)
- Positions: Right back; left half

Senior career*
Years	Team	Apps	(Gls)
1929–1948	Arsenal	285	(0)

International career
1934–1939	England	19	(0)
- * Club domestic league appearances and goals

Charles George Male (8 May 1910 – 19 February 1998) was an English footballer.

== Playing career ==
Born in West Ham, Essex, he is distantly related to current Arsenal player Max Dowman - Male's two-times great-grandfather is also Dowman's four-times great-grandfather.

He trialled with West Ham United before playing with non-league Clapton. He joined Arsenal as an amateur in November 1929, turning professional in May 1930 and made his debut in a 7–1 victory over Blackpool on 27 December 1930. Initially a left-winger or left-half, usually deputising for Bob John. Male's appearances were few and far between - three in 1930–31 (in which Arsenal won the First Division for the first time in their history) and nine in 1931–32, although he was a surprise choice at left half in the 1932 FA Cup final after Alex James was withdrawn because of injury and the side reshuffled as a result. Arsenal controversially lost 2–1 to Newcastle United, after Newcastle's equaliser had come after the ball had already gone behind for a goal kick.

In 1932, with Arsenal's current right back Tom Parker ageing and his replacement, Leslie Compton, not looking entirely assured, Male was converted from left half to right back by Arsenal manager Herbert Chapman; Male would later recount how, before being told of the switch by Chapman, he entered his office fearing for his future at the club, but Chapman convinced him not only could he play at right back, but that he was the best right back in the country.

Bolstered by Chapman's pep talk, Male slotted into the right back role easily, and he became a near ever-present for the next seven seasons; he was undisputed first-choice right back and played over 35 matches for every season in that period. During that time, Arsenal won the First Division four more times (1932–33, 1933–34, 1934–35 and 1937–38), as well as the FA Cup in 1935–36. He also won the FA Charity Shield in 1933, 1934 and 1938.

Male's performances for club soon meant he was an international; he made his debut for England against Scotland on 14 November 1934 and went on to win nineteen caps for his country, captaining the team for six of them.

By the end of the 1930s, Male was Arsenal captain, although injuries restricted his appearances in 1938–39. However, World War II intervened when Male was 29 and at the peak of his career; he played nearly 200 wartime matches for Arsenal, as well as serving in the Royal Air Force in Palestine. Upon the resumption of League football Male was 36, but still played 8 times in Arsenal's 1947–48 First Division-winning season, and thus became the first player in League history to play in six title-winning seasons. His last match for Arsenal was an 8–0 victory over Grimsby Town in May 1948. In all he played 318 matches for the Gunners, though he never scored a goal.

== Coaching career ==
After retiring from playing, Male became a coach at Arsenal, training the youth and reserve teams. He was later a scout, discovering, amongst others, Charlie George. He was still at the club to see it win its first Double in 1970–71, before retiring finally in 1975; he later emigrated to Canada to live with his son. Although at the time of his death in February 1998, at the age of 87, he was reported as being the last survivor of the Herbert Chapman era, Ray Bowden survived until September that year, and to a greater age (89).

== Honours ==
Arsenal

- FA Cup: 1935–36; runner-up: 1931–32
