= Jack Crayston =

English footballer (1910–1992)

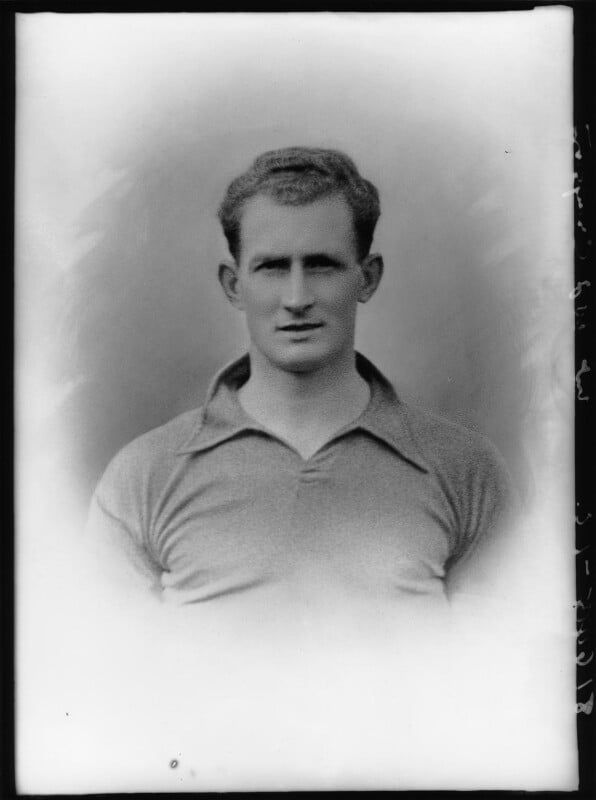
- Crayston in 1936

Personal information
- Full name: William John Crayston
- Date of birth: 9 October 1910
- Place of birth: Grange-over-Sands, Lancashire, England
- Date of death: 26 December 1992 (aged 82)
- Position: Right-half

Senior career*
Years	Team	Apps	(Gls)
?–1928	Ulverston Town		
1928–1930	Barrow	77	(1)
1930–1934	Bradford Park Avenue	97	(15)
1934–1943	Arsenal	168	(16)

International career
1935–1937	England	8	(1)

Managerial career
- 1956–1958: Arsenal
- 1958–1961: Doncaster Rovers
- * Club domestic league appearances and goals

William John Crayston (9 October 1910 – 26 December 1992) was an English football player and manager.

== Playing career ==
Born in Grange-over-Sands, Lancashire, Crayston played for local school sides and Ulverston Town before moving to Third Division North Barrow in 1928. He spent two seasons there before moving to Second Division Bradford (Park Avenue), where he developed into a strong and aerially powerful right-half.

Despite breaking both his wrist and leg in 1933–34, Crayston was signed by First Division champions Arsenal in 1934 as a replacement for Charlie Jones. He scored on his competitive debut in an 8–1 thrashing of Liverpool on 1 September 1934 and became a regular in the Arsenal side straight away, largely pushing Frank Hill out of the right-half spot. With Arsenal he won the League championship in 1934–35 and 1937–38, and the FA Cup in 1935–36. He also won the 1938 FA Charity Shield.

During this time, Crayston also became an England international; he made his debut in a 3–1 win against Germany on 4 December 1935, and in all won eight caps for his country between 1935 and 1937, scoring one goal. His final cap came in a 5–4 win against Czechoslovakia on 1 December 1937.

== Coaching and managerial career ==
Like many of his contemporaries, the Second World War robbed Crayston of what should have been the peak of his career; he joined the Royal Air Force whilst still playing irregular wartime football. However, a serious knee injury in a wartime match against West Ham United in 1943 forced Crayston to retire from playing. He played 207 matches in total (168 league matches), scoring 17 goals (16 league goals).

After his premature retirement and demobbing from the RAF, Crayston moved into coaching, and in June 1947 he became assistant to new Arsenal manager Tom Whittaker. After Whittaker's death in 1956, Crayston became caretaker manager on 24 October 1956 and permanent manager on 21 December 1956. However, his stewardship of the team was brief and unsuccessful; unable to bring any new players in, the team started to decline. In 1957–58 Arsenal slipped to 12th in the League (their worst position for 38 years) and faced a humiliating FA Cup defeat at the hands of Third Division South Northampton Town. Disillusioned, in May 1958 he resigned as Arsenal manager, and took up the reins at Doncaster Rovers a couple of months later, holding the post until his retirement from the game in 1961. He died in 1992, at the age of 82.

== Honours ==
Arsenal

- FA Cup: 1935–36
