= Cliff Bastin =

English footballer (1912–1991)

- Bastin in 1935

Personal information
- Full name: Clifford Sydney Bastin
- Date of birth: 14 March 1912
- Place of birth: Exeter, England
- Date of death: 4 December 1991 (aged 79)
- Place of death: Exeter, England
- Position: Left winger

Senior career*
Years	Team	Apps	(Gls)
1928–1929	Exeter City	17	(6)
1929–1947	Arsenal	395	(178)
Total		367	(184)

International career
1931–1938	England	21	(12)
- * Club domestic league appearances and goals

Clifford Sydney Bastin (14 March 1912 – 4 December 1991) was an English footballer who played as a winger for Exeter City and Arsenal. He also played for the England national team. Bastin is Arsenal's third-highest goalscorer of all time.

== Club career ==
=== Exeter City ===
Born in Exeter, Bastin started his career at Exeter City, making his début for the first team in 1928, at the age of 16. The match was on 14 April away against Coventry City. A week later Cliff Bastin scored two goals in Exeter's 5–1 home victory over Newport County, and was named man of the match. Despite only playing 17 games and scoring 6 goals in his time at Exeter, he was spotted by Arsenal manager Herbert Chapman in a match against Watford. Chapman was at the game to watch Watford player Tommy Barnett. But the 17-year-old Bastin's ability became so evident to him that he decided to sign him in May 1929.

=== Arsenal ===
Bastin made his début against Everton on 5 October 1929 and was immediately a first-team regular, making 21 league and 8 cup appearances that season. He went on to be a near ever-present in the side over the next decade, playing over 35 matches in every season up to and including 1937–38. His youthful appearance earned him the nickname "Boy Bastin", but despite such, Bastin's play was characterised by a remarkable coolness, and deadly precision in front of goal; he also became Arsenal's regular penalty-taker. Bastin's scoring feats are all the more remarkable considering he played on the left wing rather than as forward. At the time, Arsenal's strategy depended heavily on their wingers cutting into the penalty box with a supply of passes from playmaker Alex James being the source of many goals as well.

With Arsenal, Bastin won the FA Cup twice, in 1929–30 and 1935–36, and the First Division title five times, in 1930–31, 1932–33, 1933–34, 1934–35 and 1937–38. He played in Arsenal's 2–1 victory over Sheffield Wednesday in the Charity Shield at Stamford Bridge in October 1930. By the age of nineteen Bastin had won a League title, FA Cup and been capped for England, making him the youngest player ever to achieve all three. He scored 28 goals for Arsenal during the 1930-31 season. Bastin finished as Arsenal top scorer in 1932–33 and 1933–34, with 33 and 15 goals respectively. After centre-forward Ted Drake arrived in March 1934, Bastin was no longer Arsenal's primary winger.

With Drake scoring the majority of the goals and Alex James increasingly unavailable due to injury and age, Bastin was moved to inside-forward to replace James for much of the 1935–36 season, which saw Arsenal drop to sixth. Bastin still scored 17 goals, including six in Arsenal's run to the 1936 FA Cup Final, which they won 1–0. From 1 November during the 1936-37 season, at his own request, he played at right half. Bastin was eventually restored to the left wing to score 17 goals in the 1937–38 title-winning season. An injury to his right leg ruled him out of much of the 1938–39 season, the last one played before the outbreak of the Second World War.

The Second World War intervened when Bastin was 27, thus cutting short what should have been the peak of his career, although his leg injury would probably have done this in any case. Bastin was excused military service as he failed the army hearing test owing to his increasing deafness. Thus, during the war, he served as an ARP Warden, being stationed on top of Highbury stadium with Tom Whittaker. He also played matches in the Wartime League which was set up to boost civilian morale. He played 241 games during the war, and scored 70 goals. However, these matches are classed as unofficial, and do not count towards a player's career appearances and goal-scoring statistics.

Bastin's injured leg had hampered his performances in wartime matches, and would ultimately curtail his career. After the war, Bastin, by now in his thirties, would only play seven more times for Arsenal without scoring. His last appearance before retirement, came in an away match against Manchester United on 28 September 1946. The retirement of Cliff Bastin was announced in June 1947, while he was recovering from an ear operation.

Bastin's tally of 178 goals made him Arsenal's all-time top goalscorer from 1939 until 1997, when his total was surpassed by Ian Wright. In 2005 Thierry Henry passed each player's totals, and so Bastin is Arsenal's third-top goalscorer of all time. His record of 150 league goals for Arsenal stood for slightly longer, being equalled by Henry on 14 January 2006 and surpassed by him in February of the same year.

== International career ==
Bastin made his debut at senior level for England against Wales. This game was played at Anfield on 18 November 1931, which England won by a 3–1 margin. His first goal for England occurred in his second match for the national team, away against Italy, on 13 May 1933. A week later, he scored two goals against Switzerland in Bern. A most noteworthy highlight of his England career was the famous "Battle of Highbury", where England defeated 1934 World Cup winners Italy 3–2. Bastin also featured in a notorious match against Germany in Berlin in 1938, when the England team was ordered to give the Nazi salute before the match. England won 6–3, and Cliff Bastin scored his tenth goal for England. Bastin may have won more caps but at the time faced competition from Eric Brook. His last goal for England came via a penalty against France in Paris, on 26 May 1938. This was also Bastin's last international appearance.

Hugo Meisl, the coach of Austria, rated Cliff Bastin very highly as a player. Talking before the 1934 World Cup, about Austria's chances of winning the tournament, Meisl was not optimistic, but believed they could do so if they had Cliff Bastin.

== Later life and death ==
After retirement, Bastin returned to his native Exeter and ran a pub. His autobiography Cliff Bastin Remembers, was ghost-written in 1950 by Brian Glanville. He died in 1991 at the age of 79. A stand at St James Park, Exeter's home ground, is named in his honour and in 2009 he was inducted into the English Football Hall of Fame.

== Personal life ==
Bastin married Joan L. Shaul at Hendon, North London, in 1939. She outlived him by just over 20 years, dying in April 2012 at the age of 96. They had two daughters, Patricia and Barbara.

== Honours ==
Arsenal

- Football League First Division: 1930–31, 1932–33, 1933–34, 1934–35, 1937–38
- FA Cup: 1929–30, 1935–36; runner up: 1931–32
- FA Charity Shield: 1930, 1931, 1933, 1934, 1938

Individual

- English Football Hall of Fame Inductee
- Exeter City Hall of fame Inductee
