= List of Arsenal F.C. players =

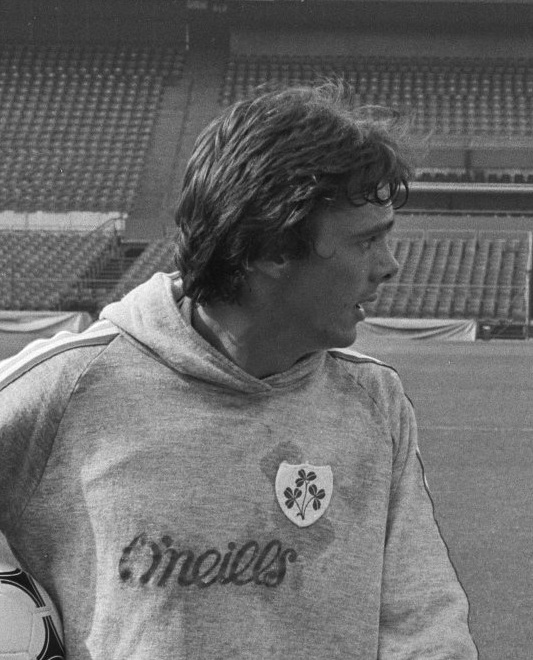
David O'Leary has played 722 times for Arsenal, more than any other player.

Arsenal Football Club, an association football club based in Islington, London, was founded in 1886 as Dial Square. They became the first southern member (Note: A club located in the southern counties of England. Initially these were amateur clubs, as professionalism in football was not as readily accepted in the south as in the north. In the 1893–94 season, Arsenal (under its former name Woolwich Arsenal) turned professional and became the first southern club admitted to the northern-oriented Football League. The following year saw the creation of the Southern Football League, which was composed of amateur and professional teams. By the 1920–21 season, the top division of the Southern Football League was absorbed by the Football League, to create its third division.) admitted into the Football League in 1893, having spent their first four seasons solely participating in cup tournaments and friendlies. The club's name, which shortly changed to Woolwich Arsenal, was shortened to Arsenal in 1914, a year after the club moved to Highbury. Despite finishing fifth in the Second Division in 1914–15, Arsenal rejoined the First Division at the expense of local rivals Tottenham Hotspur when football resumed after the First World War. Since that time, they have not fallen below the first tier of the English football league system and hold the record for the longest uninterrupted period in the top flight. The club's first team has competed in numerous nationally and internationally organised competitions, and all players who have played in 100 or more such matches are listed below.

David O'Leary holds the record for the greatest number of appearances for Arsenal. Between 1975 and 1993 the Irish defender played 722 times for the club. As of 2024, only eight players have made more than 500 appearances for Arsenal, including four of the so-called "famous five" defenders of the 1990s, Tony Adams, Lee Dixon, David Seaman and Nigel Winterburn. The club's goalscoring record is held by Thierry Henry, who scored 228 goals in all competitions between 1999 and 2007 and during a loan spell with the club in 2012. He surpassed the previous record of 185 goals, held by Ian Wright, in 2005, and became the first player to score 200 goals for Arsenal the following year.

In 2013, Arsenal launched the "100 Club" to formally recognise retired players with over 100 league appearances. As of September 2016, 75 living players have been inducted with a further 26 automatically enrolled once they end their careers.

As of 27 October 2026, a total of 934 players have played at least one official match for Arsenal throughout history. Alongside the British Isles, players from 65 different nationalities have played for Arsenal. Outside of the British Isles, France are the most represented with 30 players throughout history, followed by Spain with 19 players, and then Brazil with 16 players.

== Key ==
- The list is ordered first by date of debut, and then if necessary in alphabetical order.
- Appearances as a substitute are included. This feature of the game was introduced in the Football League at the start of the 1965–66 season.

Positions key
Pre-1960s		1960s–	
GK	Goalkeeper		
FB	Full-back	DF	Defender
HB	Half-back	MF	Midfielder
FW	Forward		

Nationality
Unless otherwise noted, the nationality of a player is determined by the country/countries which he has played for, or if said person has not played international football, their country of birth.
Position
Playing positions are listed according to the tactical formations that were employed at the time. Thus, the change in the names of defensive and midfield positions reflects the tactical evolution that occurred from the 1960s onwards.
Club career
Club career is defined as the first and last calendar years in which the player appeared for the club in any of the competitions listed below.
Total appearances and Total goals
Total appearances and goals comprise those in the Football League, Premier League, FA Cup, Football League Cup, FA Charity/Community Shield, European Cup/UEFA Champions League, UEFA Cup/UEFA Europa League, Inter-Cities Fairs Cup, UEFA Cup Winners' Cup, Football League Centenary Trophy and European Super Cup. Matches in the United League, Southern District Combination, London League and wartime competitions are excluded.

== Players ==
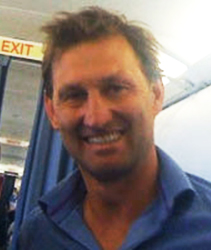
Tony Adams, who lies second in the all-time appearance list with 669. He was also captain from 1988 to 2002.

Percy Sands made 350 appearances in the early years, when the team was known as Woolwich Arsenal.

Another early player, Joe Shaw made 326 appearances.

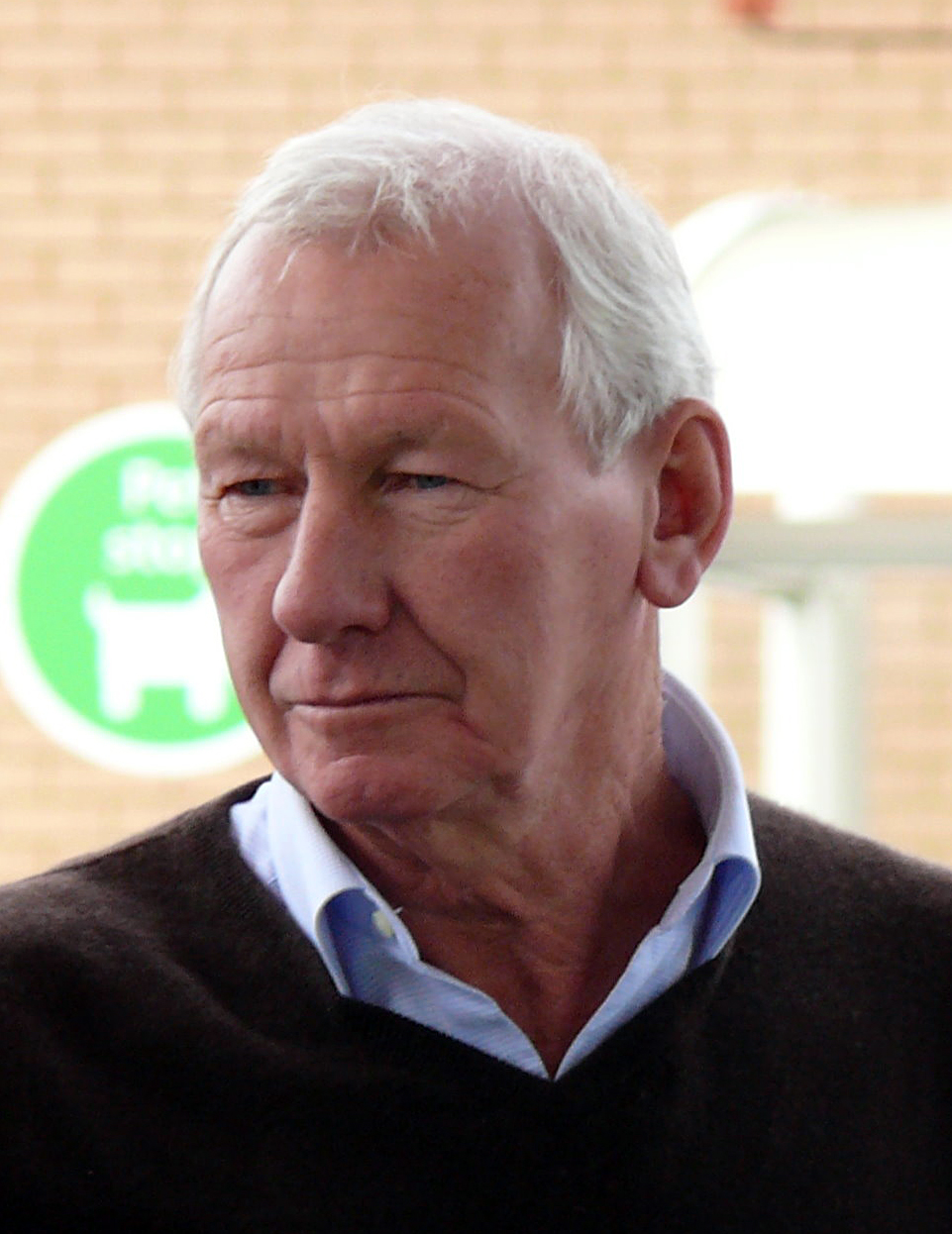
Bob Wilson made 308 appearances for the club in the 1960s and 70s.

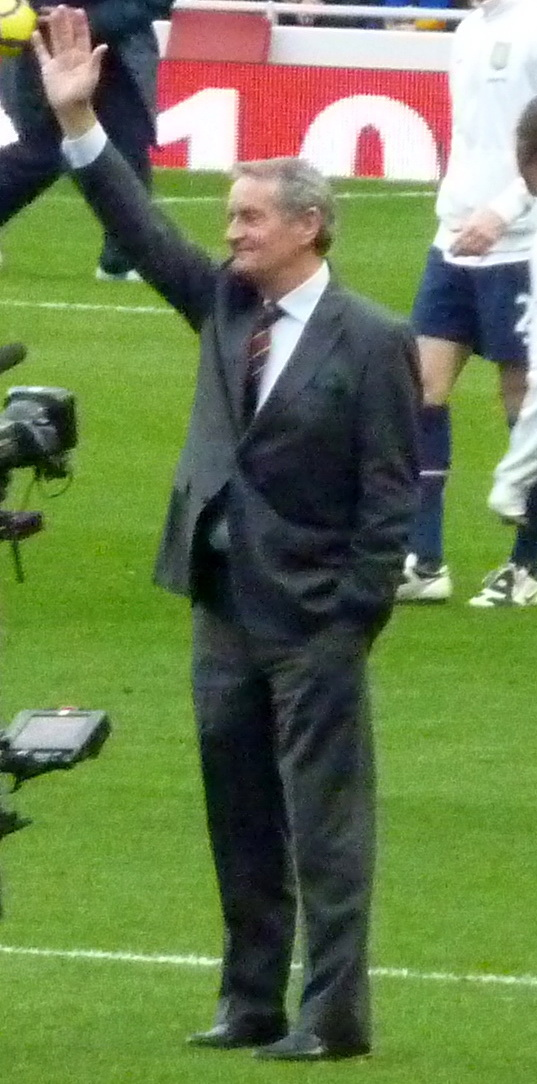
Frank McLintock made 403 appearances for the Gunners.

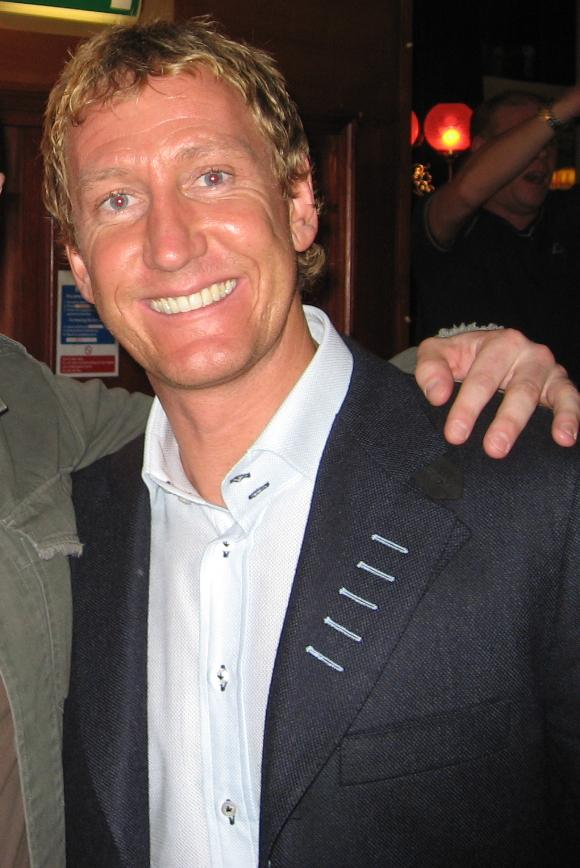
Nicknamed "The Romford Pelé", Ray Parlour has 464 appearances.

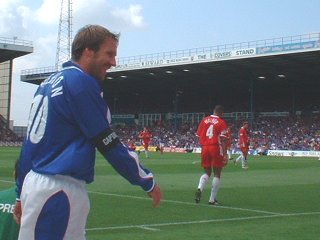
Seen here during his time with Portsmouth, Paul Merson has 423 appearances.

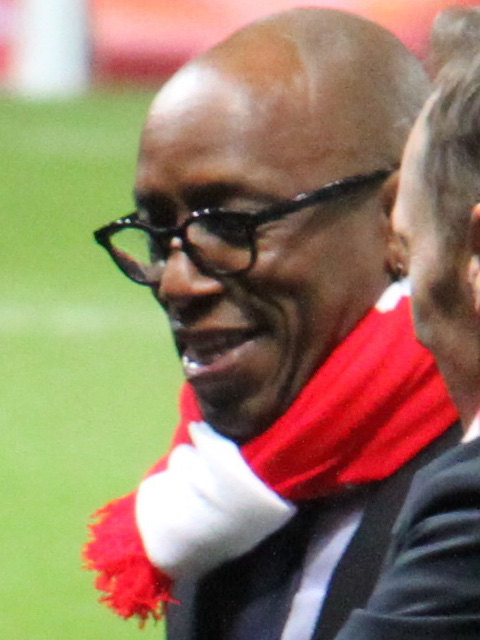
Ian Wright is Arsenal's second-highest all-time goalscorer.

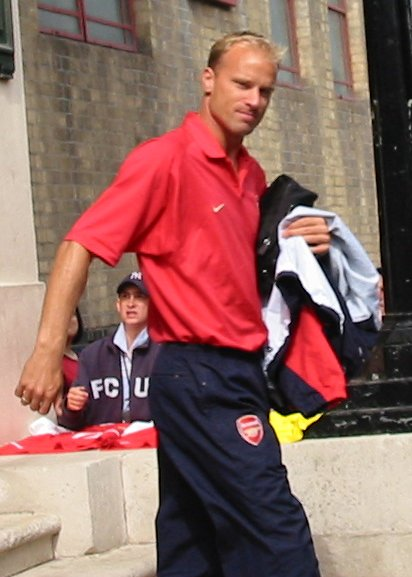
Dennis Bergkamp has more appearances than any other overseas player.

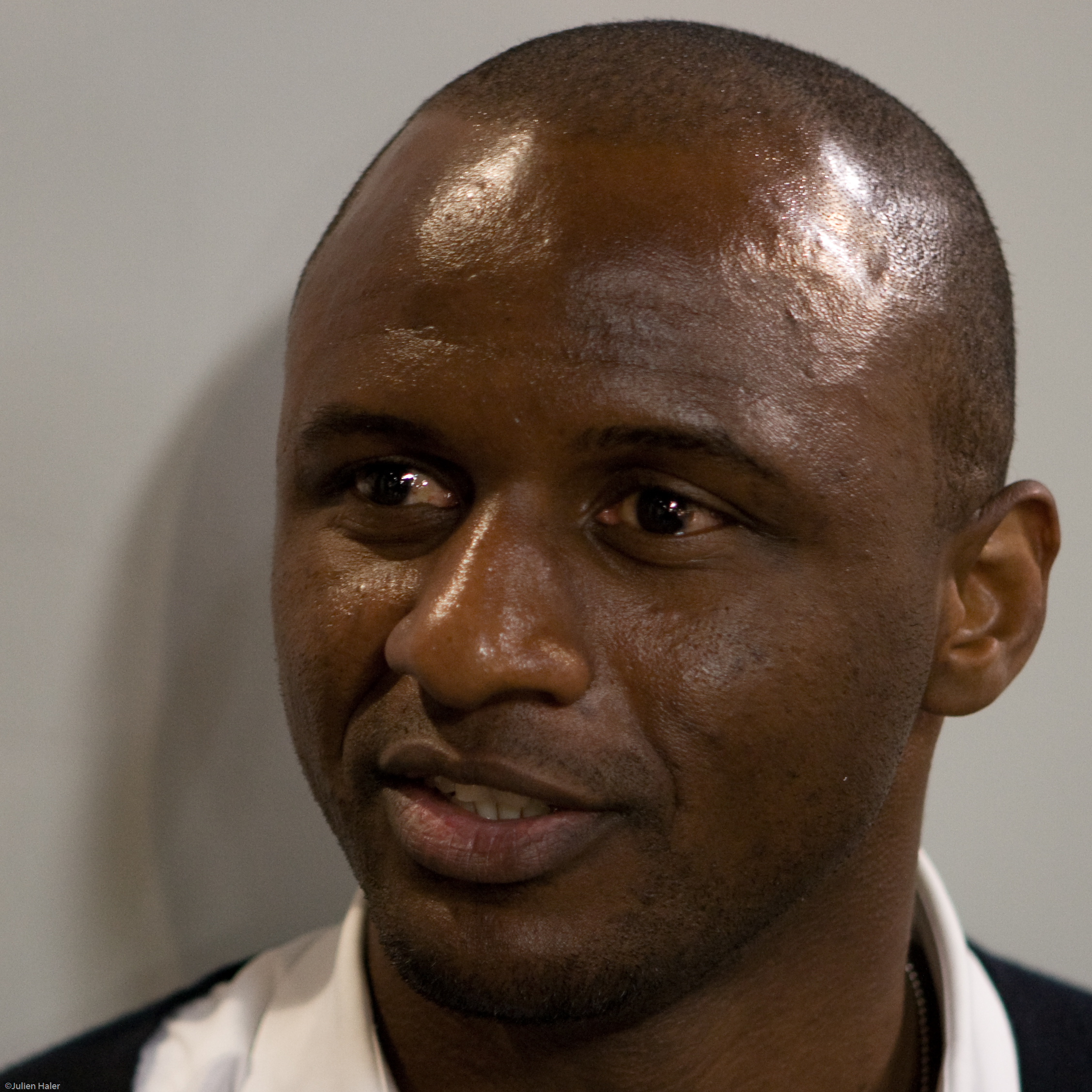
Patrick Vieira was captain from 2002 to 2005.

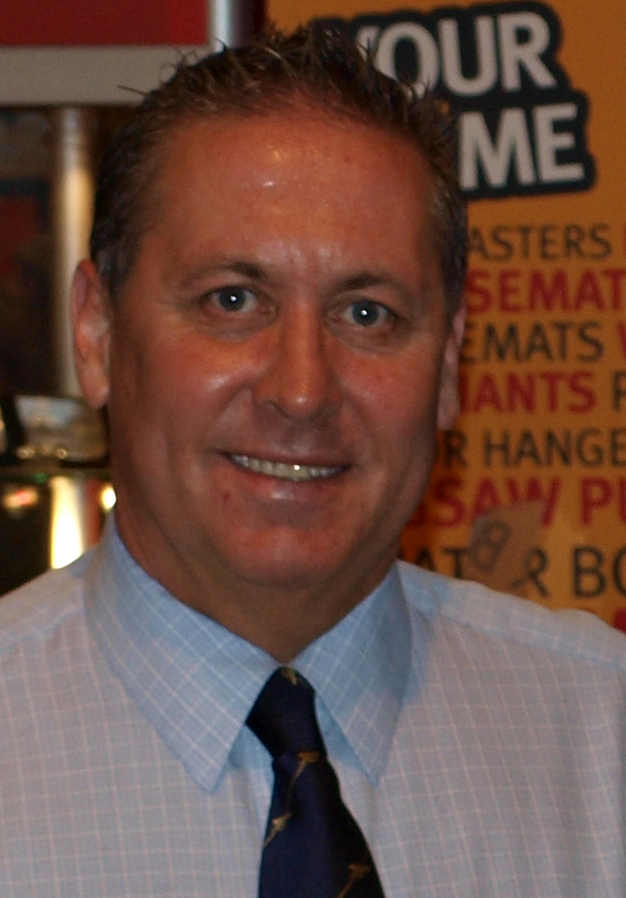
Kenny Sansom preceded Tony Adams as captain, holding the post until 1988.

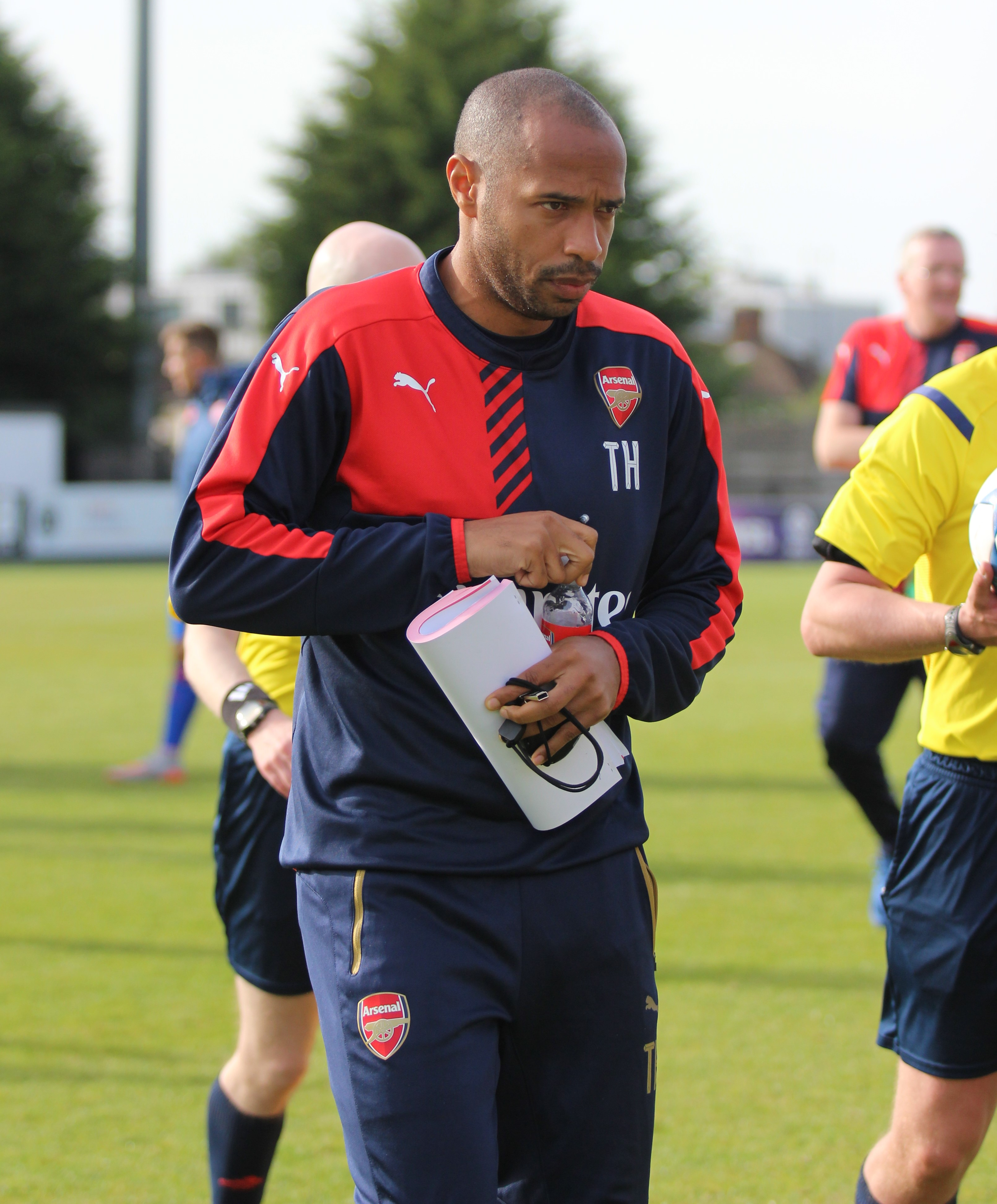
Thierry Henry is the all-time record goalscorer, and was also captain from 2005 to 2007.

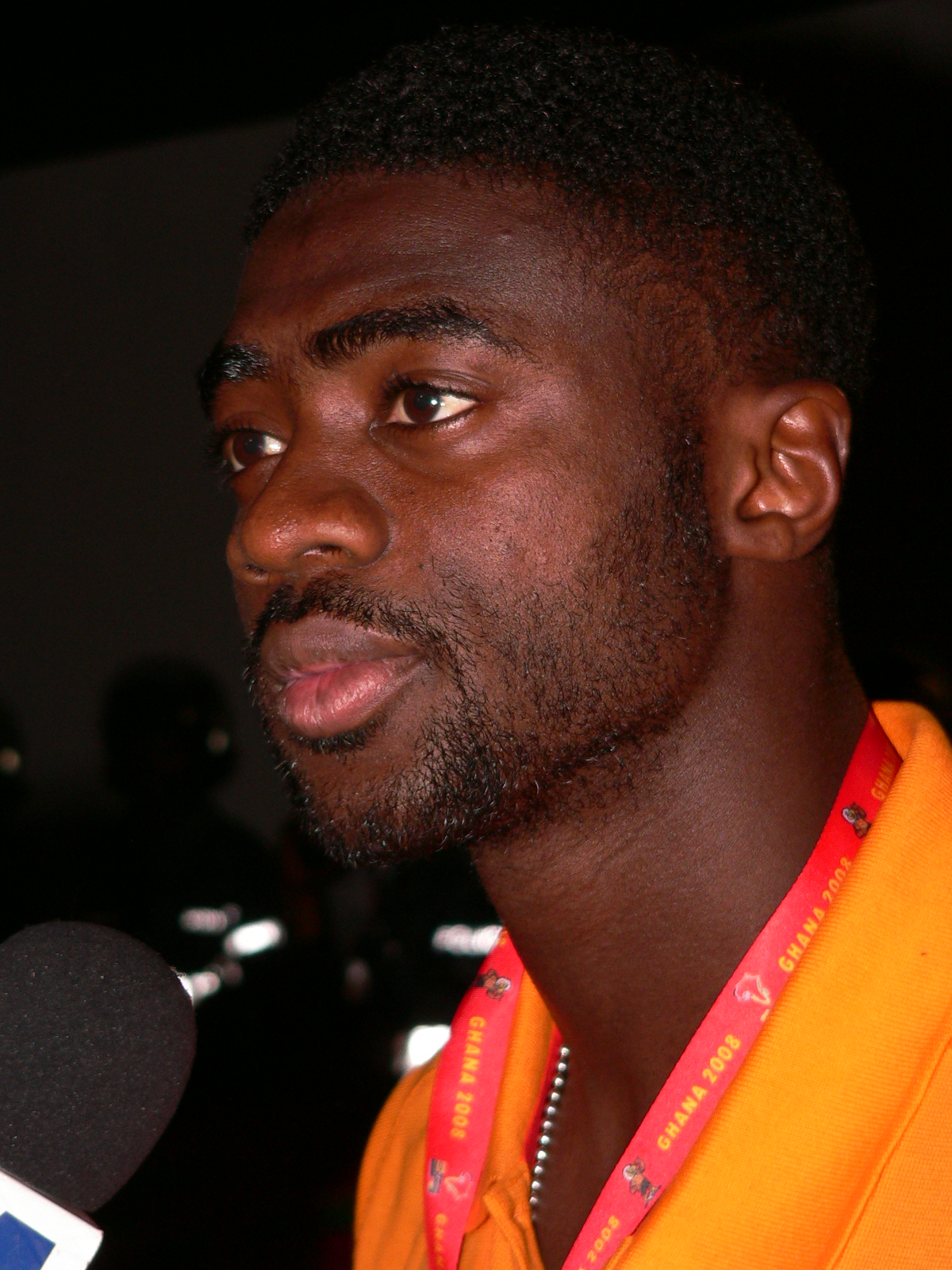
Kolo Touré made 326 appearances for Arsenal.

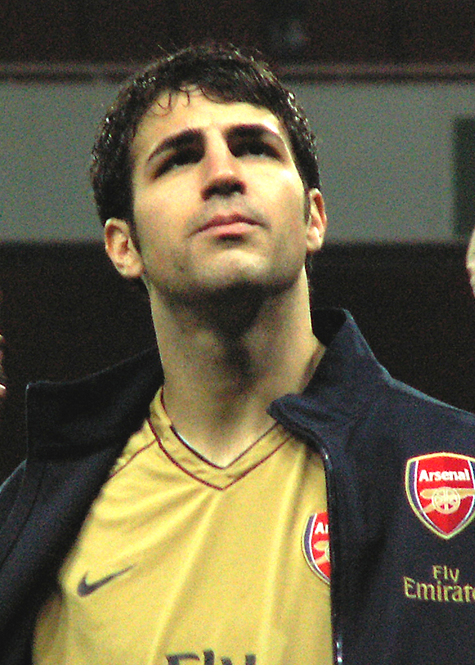
Cesc Fàbregas is Arsenal's youngest-ever goalscorer, and captained the side from 2008 to 2011.

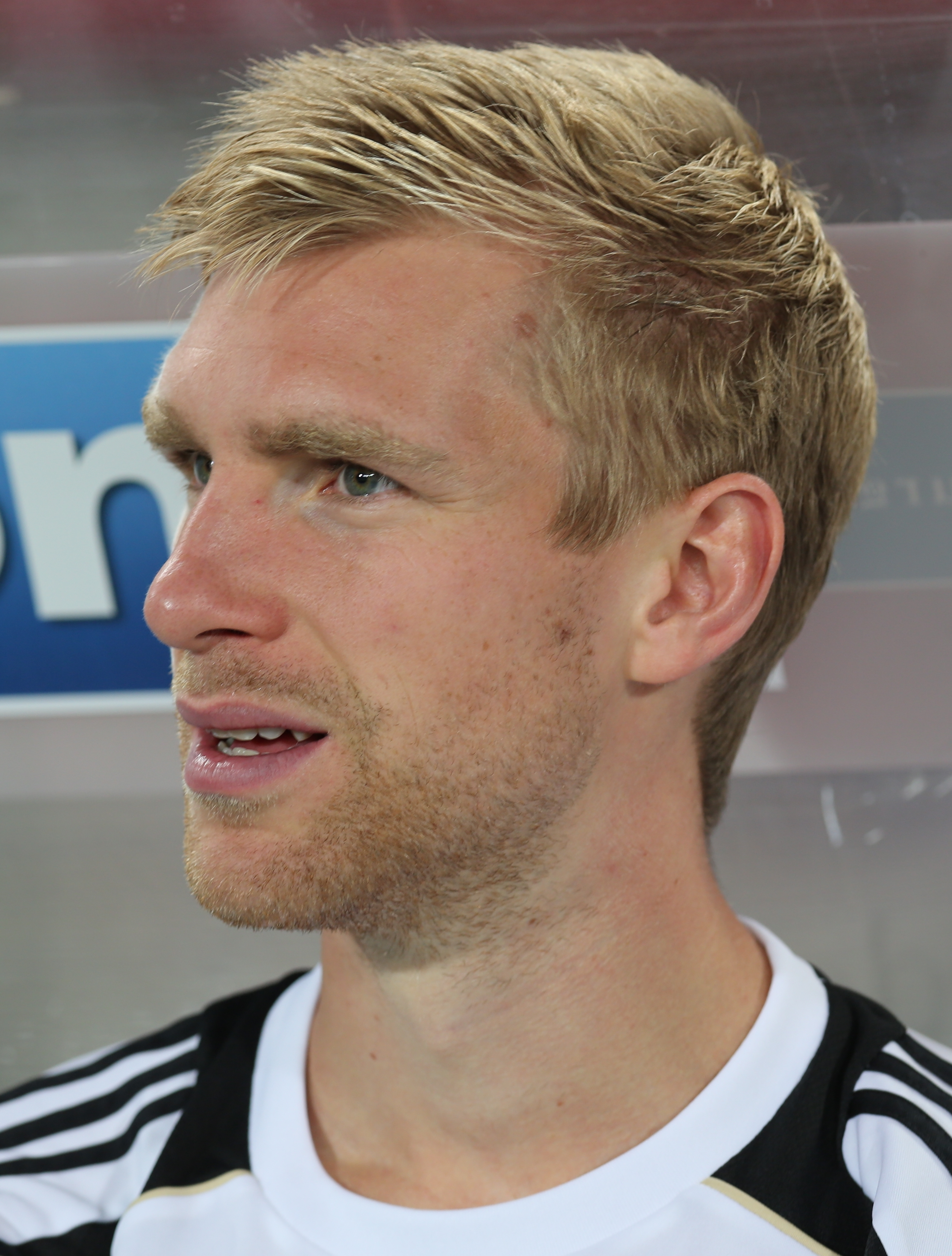
Per Mertesacker made 221 appearances for Arsenal and is the current Arsenal Academy manager.

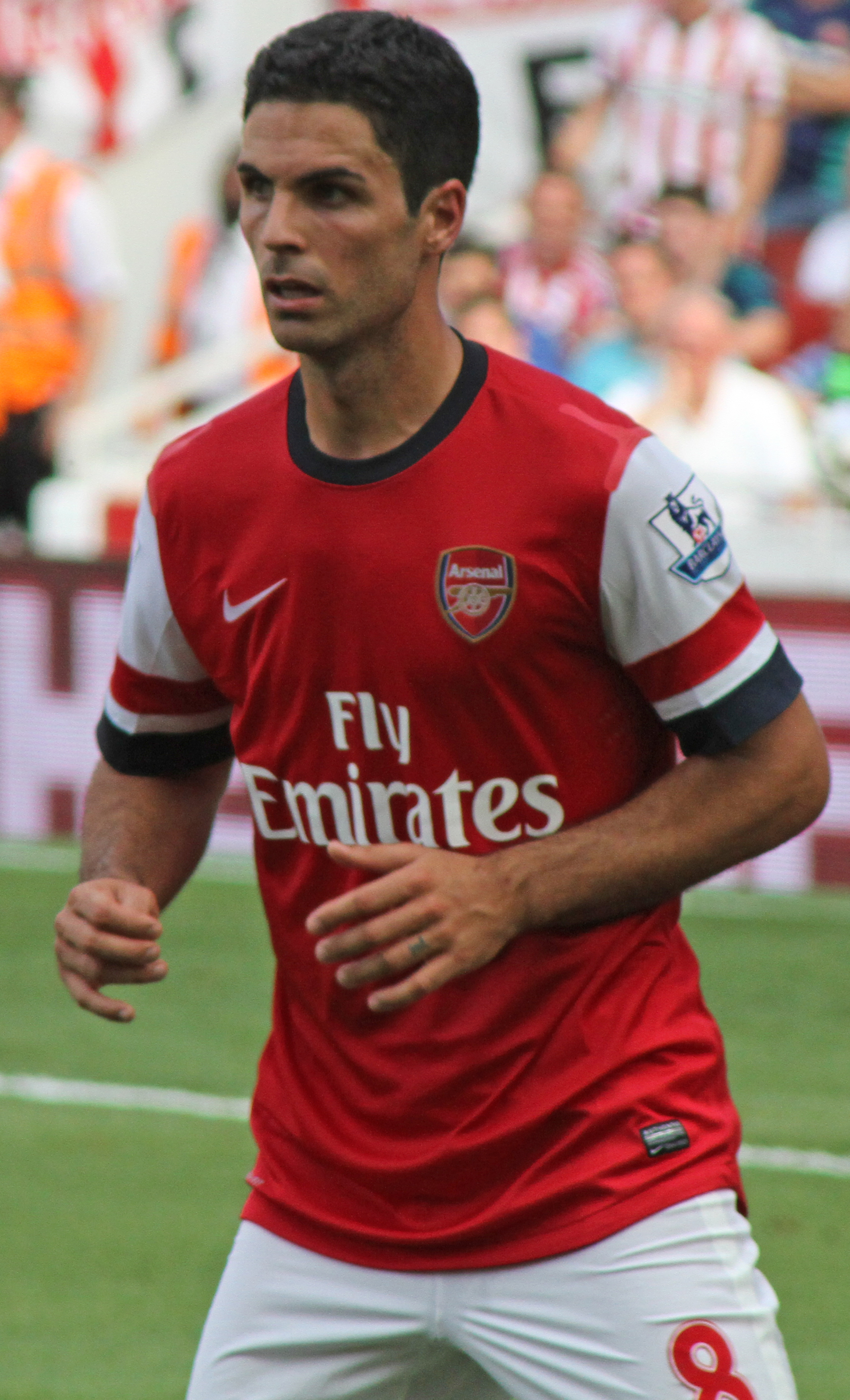
Mikel Arteta made 150 appearances for Arsenal and is the current manager.

Players highlighted in bold are still actively playing at Arsenal.

Statistics are correct up to and including the match played on 21 November 2026

List of Arsenal F.C. players with 100 or more appearances
Player	Nationality	Pos	Club career	Starts	Subs	Total	Goals
Player	Nationality	Pos	Club career	Appearances			Goals
Gavin Crawford	Scotland	FW	1891–1898	138	0	138	18
Fred Davis	England	HB	1893–1899	150	0	150	10
John Anderson	England	HB	1896–1903	153	0	153	11
John Dick	Scotland	HB	1898–1912	284	0	284	13
Duncan McNicol	Scotland	FB	1899–1903	112	0	112	1
Jimmy Jackson	Scotland	FB	1899–1905	204	0	204	1
Archie Cross	England	FB	1900–1910	149	0	149	0
Jimmy Ashcroft	England	GK	1900–1908	303	0	303	0
Tommy Briercliffe	England	FW	1901–1905	133	0	133	34
Bill Gooing	England	FW	1901–1905	106	0	106	48
Tim Coleman	England	FW	1902–1908	196	0	196	84
Roddy McEachrane	Scotland	HB	1902–1915	346	0	346	0
Percy Sands	England	HB	1902–1919	350	0	350	12
Archie Gray	Scotland	FB	1904–1912	200	0	200	0
David Neave	Scotland	FW	1904–1912	168	0	168	32
Charlie Satterthwaite	England	FW	1904–1910	141	0	141	48
Andy Ducat	England	HB	1905–1912	188	0	188	21
Jimmy Sharp	Scotland	FB	1905–1908	116	0	116	5
Hugh McDonald	Scotland	GK	1906; 1908–1910; 1912–1913	103	0	103	0
Charles Lewis	England	FW	1907–1920	220	0	220	34
Joe Shaw	England	FB	1907–1923	326	0	326	0
David Greenaway	Scotland	FW	1908–1921	170	0	170	13
Angus McKinnon	Scotland	HB	1908–1922	217	0	217	4
Pat Flanagan	England	FW	1910–1917	121	0	121	28
Alex Graham	Scotland	HB	1911–1924	179	0	179	20
Jock Rutherford	England	FW	1913–1923; 1923–1926 (Note: Rutherford left Arsenal to join Stoke in March 1923, but returned six months later.)	232	0	232	27
Billy Blyth	Scotland	HB	1914–1929	343	0	343	51
Frank Bradshaw	England	FB	1914–1923	142	0	142	14
Jack Butler	England	HB	1914–1930	296	0	296	8
Arthur Hutchins	England	FB	1919–1923	108	0	108	1
Henry White	England	FW	1919–1923	109	0	109	45
Joe Toner	Ireland	FW	1919–1926	100	0	100	6
Ernest Williamson	England	GK	1919–1923	113	0	113	0
Alf Baker	England	HB	1919–1931	351	0	351	26
Alec Mackie	Ireland	FB	1921–1926	118	0	118	1
Billy Milne	Scotland	HB	1921–1927	124	0	124	3
Jock Robson	Scotland	GK	1921–1925	101	0	101	0
Bob John	Wales	HB	1922–1937	470	0	470	13
Andy Kennedy	Ireland	FB	1922–1928	129	0	129	0
Jimmy Brain	England	FW	1924–1931	232	0	232	139
Syd Hoar	England	FW	1924–1929	117	0	117	18
Dan Lewis	Wales	GK	1924–1931	167	0	167	0
Charlie Buchan	England	FW	1925–1928	120	0	120	56
Joe Hulme	England	FW	1926–1937	374	0	374	125
Jack Lambert	England	FW	1926–1933	161	0	161	109
Tom Parker	England	FB	1926–1932	294	0	294	17
Herbie Roberts	England	HB	1926–1937	335	0	335	5
Eddie Hapgood	England	FB	1927–1939	440	0	440	2
David Jack	England	HB	1928–1934	208	0	208	124
Charlie Jones	Wales	FW	1928–1934	195	0	195	8
Cliff Bastin	England	FW	1929–1947	396	0	396	178
Alex James	Scotland	HB	1929–1937	261	0	261	27
Leslie Compton	England	HB	1930–1950	273	0	273	6
George Male	England	FB	1930–1948	318	0	318	0
Frank Moss	England	GK	1931–1936	161	0	161	1
Ray Bowden	England	FW	1933–1937	138	0	138	48
Wilf Copping	England	HB	1934–1939	189	0	189	0
Jack Crayston	England	HB	1934–1939	187	0	187	17
Ted Drake	England	FW	1934–1939	184	0	184	139
Alf Kirchen	England	FW	1935–1939	101	0	101	45
Reg Lewis	England	FW	1935–1953	176	0	176	118
George Swindin	England	GK	1936–1953	297	0	297	0
Walley Barnes	Wales	FB	1946–1955	294	0	294	12
Jimmy Logie	Scotland	HB	1946–1955	328	0	328	76
Ian McPherson	Scotland	FW	1946–1951	163	0	163	21
Joe Mercer	England	HB	1946–1954	275	0	275	2
Laurie Scott	England	FB	1946–1951	126	0	126	0
Archie Macaulay	Scotland	HB	1947–1950	108	0	108	1
Don Roper	England	FW	1947–1956	321	0	321	95
Alex Forbes	Scotland	HB	1948–1956	240	0	240	20
Doug Lishman	England	FW	1948–1955	244	0	244	137
Lionel Smith	England	FB	1948–1954	181	0	181	0
Peter Goring	England	FW	1949–1959	240	0	240	53
Jack Kelsey	Wales	GK	1949–1962	352	0	352	0
Cliff Holton	England	FW	1950–1958	217	0	217	88
Dave Bowen	Wales	HB	1951–1959	162	0	162	2
Dennis Evans	England	FB	1951–1960	207	0	207	12
Bill Dodgin	England	HB	1953–1960	207	0	207	1
Len Wills	England	FB	1953–1961	209	0	209	4
Jimmy Bloomfield	England	FW	1954–1960	227	0	227	56
Danny Clapton	England	FW	1954–1962	225	0	225	27
Joe Haverty	Republic of Ireland	FW	1954–1961	122	0	122	26
Derek Tapscott	Wales	HB	1954–1958	132	0	132	68
Stan Charlton	England	FB	1955–1958	110	0	110	3
Vic Groves	England	HB	1955–1964	203	0	203	37
David Herd	Scotland	FW	1955–1961	180	0	180	107
John Barnwell	England	HB	1957–1964	151	0	151	24
Jackie Henderson	Scotland	FW	1958–1961	111	0	111	29
Billy McCullough	Northern Ireland	DF	1958–1966	268	0	268	5
Eddie Magill	Northern Ireland	DF	1959–1965	131	0	131	0
George Eastham	England	FW	1960–1966	223	0	223	41
Terry Neill	Northern Ireland	DF	1960–1970	272	3	275	10
Alan Skirton	England	MF	1960–1966	153	1	154	54
Geoff Strong	England	FW	1960–1964	137	0	137	77
Laurie Brown	England	DF	1961–1963	109	0	109	2
Johnny MacLeod	Scotland	MF	1961–1964	112	0	112	28
George Armstrong	England	MF	1962–1977	607	14	621	68
Joe Baker	England	FW	1962–1966	156	0	156	100
David Court	England	MF	1962–1970	194	10	204	18
Jim Furnell	England	GK	1963–1968	167	0	167	0
Jon Sammels	England	MF	1963–1971	266	4	270	52
Ian Ure	Scotland	DF	1963–1969	202	0	202	2
Bob Wilson	Scotland	GK	1963–1974	308	0	308	0
Frank McLintock	Scotland	DF	1964–1973	401	2	403	32
John Radford	England	FW	1964–1976	475	6	481	149
Peter Simpson	England	DF	1964–1978	458	19	477	15
Peter Storey	England	DF	1965–1977	494	7	501	17
George Graham	Scotland	FW	1966–1972	296	12	308	77
Bob McNab	England	DF	1966–1975	362	3	365	6
Pat Rice	Northern Ireland	DF	1967–1980	521	7	528	13
Charlie George	England	FW	1969–1975	157	22	179	49
Eddie Kelly	Scotland	MF	1969–1975	211	11	222	19
Ray Kennedy	England	FW	1969–1974	206	6	212	71
Sammy Nelson	Northern Ireland	DF	1969–1981	325	14	339	12
Alan Ball	England	MF	1971–1976	217	0	217	52
Liam Brady	Republic of Ireland	MF	1973–1980	295	12	307	59
David Price	England	MF	1973–1981	165	11	176	19
Jimmy Rimmer	England	GK	1974–1977	146	0	146	0
David O'Leary	Republic of Ireland	DF	1973–1993	681	41	722	14
Frank Stapleton	Republic of Ireland	FW	1975–1981	297	3	300	108
John Devine	Republic of Ireland	DF	1976–1983	108	3	111	0
Malcolm Macdonald	England	FW	1976–1979	107	1	108	57
Pat Jennings	Northern Ireland	GK	1977–1984	327	0	327	0
Graham Rix	England	MF	1977–1988	447	17	464	51
Alan Sunderland	England	FW	1977–1983	278	3	281	92
Willie Young	Scotland	DF	1977–1981	236	1	237	19
John Hollins	England	MF	1979–1983	163	9	172	13
Brian Talbot	England	MF	1979–1985	311	16	327	49
Paul Davis	England	MF	1980–1994	416	31	447	37
Kenny Sansom	England	DF	1980–1988	394	0	394	6
Stewart Robson	England	MF	1981–1986	185	1	186	21
Chris Whyte	England	DF	1981–1985	108	5	113	8
Tony Woodcock	England	FW	1982–1986	164	5	169	68
Tony Adams	England	DF	1983–2002	663	6	669	48
Ian Allinson	England	MF	1983–1987	75	30	105	23
Charlie Nicholas	Scotland	FW	1983–1987	176	8	184	54
Viv Anderson	England	DF	1984–1987	150	0	150	15
Steve Williams	England	MF	1984–1988	119	2	121	5
John Lukic	England	GK	1984–1990; 1996–2001	298	0	298	0
Martin Hayes	England	MF	1985–1990	92	40	132	34
David Rocastle	England	MF	1985–1992	260	17	277	34
Martin Keown	England	DF	1985–1986; 1993–2004	408	41	449	8
Perry Groves	England	MF	1986–1992	120	83	203	28
Paul Merson	England	FW	1986–1997	381	44	425	99
Alan Smith	England	FW	1987–1995	318	29	347	115
Kevin Richardson	England	MF	1987–1990	111	11	122	8
Michael Thomas	England	MF	1987–1991	187	21	208	30
Steve Bould	England	DF	1988–1999	348	24	372	22
Kevin Campbell	England	FW	1988–1995	166	62	228	59
Lee Dixon	England	DF	1988–2002	598	21	619	28
Nigel Winterburn	England	DF	1987–2000	572	12	584	12
David Hillier	England	MF	1990–1996	113	30	143	2
Anders Limpar	Sweden	MF	1990–1994	96	20	116	20
Andy Linighan	England	DF	1990–1996	135	21	156	8
David Seaman	England	GK	1990–2003	564	0	564	0
Ian Wright	England	FW	1991–1998	279	9	288	185
John Jensen	Denmark	MF	1992–1996	130	8	138	1
Ray Parlour	England	MF	1992–2004	390	76	466	32
Dennis Bergkamp	Netherlands	FW	1995–2006	345	78	423	120
David Platt	England	MF	1995–1998	77	31	108	15
Patrick Vieira	France	MF	1996–2005	396	10	406	33
Gilles Grimandi	France	DF	1997–2002	128	42	170	6
Marc Overmars	Netherlands	MF	1997–2000	127	15	142	41
Emmanuel Petit	France	MF	1997–2000	114	4	118	11
Freddie Ljungberg	Sweden	MF	1998–2007	285	43	328	72
Ashley Cole	England	DF	1999–2006	218	10	228	9
Thierry Henry	France	FW	1999–2007; 2012	337	40	377	228
Nwankwo Kanu	Nigeria	FW	1999–2004	104	94	198	44
Oleh Luzhnyi	Ukraine	DF	1999–2003	91	19	110	0
Sylvain Wiltord	France	FW	2000–2004	124	51	175	49
Robert Pires	France	MF	2000–2006	238	46	284	84
Lauren	Cameroon	DF	2000–2006	227	14	241	9
Sol Campbell	England	DF	2001–2006; 2010	208	3	211	12
Edu	Brazil	MF	2001–2005	76	51	127	15
Gilberto Silva	Brazil	MF	2002–2008	213	31	244	24
Kolo Touré	Ivory Coast	DF	2002–2009	295	31	326	14
Jens Lehmann	Germany	GK	2003–2008; 2011	199	1	200	0
Cesc Fàbregas	Spain	MF	2003–2011	266	37	303	57
Gaël Clichy	France	DF	2003–2011	230	34	264	2
Philippe Senderos	Switzerland	DF	2004–2009	105	12	117	4
Manuel Almunia	Spain	GK	2004–2011	173	2	175	0
José Antonio Reyes	Spain	FW	2004–2006	89	21	110	23
Robin van Persie	Netherlands	FW	2004–2012	211	67	278	132
Mathieu Flamini	France	MF	2004–2008; 2013–2016	174	72	246	13
Johan Djourou	Switzerland	DF	2004–2012	123	21	144	1
Emmanuel Eboué	Ivory Coast	DF	2005–2011	159	55	214	10
Alexander Hleb	Belarus	MF	2005–2008	109	21	130	10
Nicklas Bendtner	Denmark	FW	2005–2014	83	88	171	47
Alex Song	Cameroon	MF	2005–2012	179	25	204	10
Abou Diaby	France	MF	2006–2015	136	44	180	19
Emmanuel Adebayor	Togo	FW	2006–2009	114	28	142	62
Tomáš Rosický	Czech Republic	MF	2006–2016	158	88	246	28
Theo Walcott	England	FW	2006–2018	252	145	397	108
William Gallas	France	DF	2006–2010	142	0	142	17
Denílson	Brazil	MF	2006–2011	120	33	153	10
Bacary Sagna	France	DF	2007–2014	272	12	284	5
Kieran Gibbs	England	DF	2007–2017	183	47	230	6
Aaron Ramsey	Wales	MF	2008–2019	261	108	369	64
Samir Nasri	France	MF	2008–2011	110	15	125	27
Jack Wilshere	England	MF	2008–2018	150	47	197	14
Francis Coquelin	France	MF	2008–2017	115	45	160	0
Andrey Arshavin	Russia	MF	2009–2013	97	47	144	31
Thomas Vermaelen	Belgium	DF	2009–2014	136	14	150	15
Wojciech Szczęsny	Poland	GK	2009–2015	181	0	181	0
Laurent Koscielny	France	DF	2010–2019	342	11	353	27
Alex Oxlade-Chamberlain	England	MF	2011–2017	115	83	198	20
Per Mertesacker	Germany	DF	2011–2018	215	6	221	10
Mikel Arteta	Spain	MF	2011–2016	131	19	150	16
Olivier Giroud	France	FW	2012–2018	169	84	253	105
Santi Cazorla	Spain	MF	2012–2018	166	14	180	29
Nacho Monreal	Spain	DF	2013–2019	223	28	251	10
Mesut Özil	Germany	MF	2013–2020	237	17	254	44
Héctor Bellerín	Spain	DF	2013–2021	220	19	239	9
Alexis Sánchez	Chile	FW	2014–2018	153	13	166	80
Calum Chambers	England	DF	2014–2022	87	35	122	5
Danny Welbeck	England	FW	2014–2019	78	48	126	32
Ainsley Maitland-Niles	England	MF	2014–2021	88	44	132	3
Petr Čech	Czech Republic	GK	2015–2019	139	0	139	0
Alex Iwobi	Nigeria	MF	2015–2019	103	46	149	15
Mohamed Elneny	Egypt	MF	2016–2024	108	53	161	6
Rob Holding	England	DF	2016–2023	132	30	162	5
Granit Xhaka	Switzerland	MF	2016–2023	279	18	297	23
Shkodran Mustafi	Germany	DF	2016–2020	142	9	151	9
Sead Kolašinac	Bosnia and Herzegovina	DF	2017–2022	94	24	118	5
Alexandre Lacazette	France	FW	2017–2022	150	56	206	71
Eddie Nketiah	England	FW	2017–2024	70	98	168	38
Pierre-Emerick Aubameyang	Gabon	FW	2018–2021	142	21	163	92
Bernd Leno	Germany	GK	2018–2022	124	1	125	0
Emile Smith Rowe	England	MF	2018–2024	63	52	115	18
**Bukayo Saka**	England	FW	2018–	275	48	323	85
Nicolas Pépé	Ivory Coast	FW	2019–2022	67	45	112	27
Gabriel Martinelli	Brazil	FW	2019–2026	186	92	278	62
Kieran Tierney	Scotland	DF	2019–2025	95	49	144	6
**Gabriel Magalhães**	Brazil	DF	2020–	264	14	278	25
Thomas Partey	Ghana	MF	2020–2025	132	35	167	9
**Martin Ødegaard**	Norway	MF	2021–	209	43	252	47
**Ben White**	England	DF	2021–	172	30	202	7
Gabriel Jesus	Brazil	FW	2022–2026	70	53	123	32
**William Saliba**	France	DF	2022–	180	4	184	8
Leandro Trossard	Belgium	FW	2023–2026	105	69	174	36
**Kai Havertz**	Germany	FW	2023–	98	29	127	40
**Declan Rice**	England	MF	2023–	160	14	174	22
**Jurriën Timber**	Netherlands	DF	2023–	88	18	106	7
**David Raya**	Spain	GK	2023–	163	0	163	0

== Captains ==
64 players have captained Arsenal since it was founded as Dial Square F.C. in 1886, the first being club founder David Danskin, who captained the team until he was forced to retire due to injury in 1889. The club's longest-serving captain is Tony Adams, who captained the club for 14 years between 1988 and 2002, and is frequently known as "Mr. Arsenal" for this achievement. The current captain is Martin Ødegaard.

Dates	Captain
1886–1889	(Scotland) David Danskin
1889	(England) Arthur Brown
1889–1890	(England) Morris Bates
1890–1891	(England) Bill Julian
1891–1892 (Note: Sandy Robertson replaced Bill Julian as captain in October 1891, and was the second of six captains to serve in the 1891–92 season. However, sources are unclear as to the specific dates of the captaincies of Buist, Howat, Graham, and Stewart.)	(Scotland) Sandy Robertson (Scotland) Robert Buist (England) David Howat (Scotland) Tom Graham (Scotland) William Stewart
1892–1893	(England) Charles Booth
1893–1894	(England) Joe Powell
1894–1895	(England) David Howat
1895–1896	(Wales) Caesar Jenkyns
1896–1898	(Scotland) Gavin Crawford
1898–1899	(England) John Anderson
1899–1900	(England) Joe Murphy
1900–1901	(Scotland) Duncan McNichol
1901–1905	(Scotland) Jimmy Jackson
1905–1906	(Scotland) John Dick
1906–1919	(England) Percy Sands
1919–1920	(England) Joe Shaw
1920–1922	(England) Frank Bradshaw
1922–1923	(Scotland) Alex Graham
1923–1924	(Scotland) Billy Blyth
1924–1925	(England) Alf Baker
1925–1928	(England) Charlie Buchan
1928–1929	(Scotland) Billy Blyth
1929–1932	(England) Tom Parker
1932–1933	(Wales) Charlie Jones
1933–1937	(Scotland) Alex James
1937–1944	(England) Eddie Hapgood
1944–1947	(England) George Male
1947–1954	(England) Joe Mercer
1954	(Scotland) Jimmy Logie
1954–1955	(Wales) Walley Barnes
1955–1956	(England) Don Roper
1956	(England) Cliff Holton
1956–1957	(England) Peter Goring
1957	(England) Cliff Holton
1957–1958	(England) Dennis Evans
1958–1959	(Wales) Dave Bowen
1959–1962	(England) Vic Groves
1962–1963	(Northern Ireland) Terry Neill
1963–1966	(England) George Eastham
1966–1967	(England) Don Howe
1967–1973	(Scotland) Frank McLintock
1973–1974	(England) Bob McNab
1974–1975	(England) Alan Ball
1975	(Scotland) Eddie Kelly
1975–1976	(England) Alan Ball
1976–1980	(Northern Ireland) Pat Rice
1980–1983	(Republic of Ireland) David O'Leary (Note: First captain from outside the United Kingdom.)
1983–1986	(England) Graham Rix
1986–1988	(England) Kenny Sansom
1988–2002	(England) Tony Adams (Note: Longest-serving captain.)
2002–2005	(France) Patrick Vieira (Note: First captain from outside the British Isles.)
2005–2007	(France) Thierry Henry
2007–2008	(France) William Gallas
2008–2011	(Spain) Cesc Fabregas
2011–2012	(Netherlands) Robin van Persie
2012–2014	(Belgium) Thomas Vermaelen
2014–2016	(Spain) Mikel Arteta
2016–2018	(Germany) Per Mertesacker
2018–2019	(France) Laurent Koscielny
2019	(Switzerland) Granit Xhaka
2019–2021	(Gabon) Pierre-Emerick Aubameyang (Note: First non-European captain.)
2021–2022	(France) Alexandre Lacazette
2022–present	(Norway) Martin Ødegaard
