= 1950–51 Arsenal F.C. season =

English football club season

Arsenal
1950–51 season
- Chairman: Bracewell Smith
- Manager: Tom Whittaker
- Stadium: Highbury
- First Division: 5th
- FA Cup: Fifth round
- Top goalscorer: League: Doug Lishman (17); All: Doug Lishman (17)
- Highest home attendance: 72,408 vs. Northampton Town (27 January 1951)
- Lowest home attendance: 32,374 vs. Burnley (16 December 1950)
Home colours	Away colours

The 1950–51 season was Arsenal Football Club's 25th consecutive season in the top flight of English football.

== Results ==
Arsenal's score comes first

=== Legend ===
Win	Draw	Loss

=== Football League First Division ===
Date	Opponent	Venue	Result	Attendance	Scorers
19 August 1950	Burnley	A	1–0	32,957	Roper
23 August 1950	Chelsea	H	0–0	61,166	
26 August 1950	Tottenham Hotspur	H	2–2	64,600	Roper, Barnes (pen.)
30 August 1950	Chelsea	A	1–0	48,792	Cox
5 September 1950	Sheffield Wednesday	H	3–0	45,647	Logie (2), Lishman
6 September 1950	Everton	H	2–1	36,576	Cox, Barnes (pen.)
9 September 1950	Middlesbrough	A	1–2	46,119	Lishman
13 September 1950	Everton	A	1–1	47,518	Goring
16 September 1950	Huddersfield Town	H	6–2	51,518	Goring (3), Logie (2), Lishman
23 September 1950	Newcastle United	A	1–2	66,926	Logie
30 September 1950	West Bromwich Albion	H	3–0	51,928	Lishman (2), Logie
7 October 1950	Charlton Athletic	A	3–1	63,539	Goring, Forbes, Roper
14 October 1950	Manchester United	H	3–0	66,150	Lishman, Goring, own goal
21 October 1950	Aston Villa	A	1–1	53,111	Logie
28 October 1950	Derby County	H	3–1	62,889	Logie, Forbes, Goring
4 November 1950	Wolverhampton Wanderers	A	1–0	55,548	Lishman
11 November 1950	Sunderland	H	5–1	68,682	Lishman (4), Roper
18 November 1950	Liverpool	A	3–1	44,193	Lishman, Logie, Roper
25 November 1950	Fulham	H	5–1	41,344	Lishman (3), Goring, Forbes
2 December 1950	Bolton Wanderers	A	0–3	40,489	
9 December 1950	Blackpool	H	4–4	57,445	Lishman, Forbes, Goring, Barnes (pen.)
16 December 1950	Burnley	H	0–1	32,374	
23 December 1950	Tottenham Hotspur	A	0–1	54,896	
25 December 1950	Stoke City	H	0–3	36,852	
26 December 1950	Stoke City	A	0–1	43,315	
30 December 1950	Sheffield Wednesday	A	2–0	39,583	Goring
13 January 1951	Middlesbrough	H	3–1	65,083	Lewis (2), Goring
20 January 1951	Huddersfield Town	A	2–2	37,175	Lewis (2)
3 February 1951	Newcastle United	H	0–0	55,073	
17 February 1951	West Bromwich Albion	A	0–2	45,999	
24 February 1951	Charlton Athletic	H	2–5	58,137	Goring (2)
3 March 1951	Manchester United	A	1–3	46,202	Holton
10 March 1951	Aston Villa	H	2–1	43,747	Lewis (2)
17 March 1951	Derby County	A	2–4	22,168	Lewis, Goring
23 March 1951	Portsmouth	H	0–1	52,051	
24 March 1951	Wolverhampton Wanderers	H	2–1	54,213	Holton (2)
26 March 1951	Portsmouth	A	1–1	39,189	Marden
31 March 1951	Sunderland	A	2–0	31,515	Marden, Roper
7 April 1951	Liverpool	H	1–2	34,664	Holton
14 April 1951	Fulham	A	2–3	34,111	Holton, Lewis
21 April 1951	Bolton Wanderers	H	1–1	45,040	Lishman
2 May 1951	Blackpool	A	1–0	23,044	Roper

==== Final League table ====
Pos	Team	Pld	W	D	L	GF	GA	GAv	Pts
3	Blackpool	42	20	10	12	79	53	1.491	50
4	Newcastle United	42	18	13	11	62	53	1.170	49
5	Arsenal	42	19	9	14	73	56	1.304	47
6	Middlesbrough	42	18	11	13	76	65	1.169	47
7	Portsmouth	42	16	15	11	71	68	1.044	47

Source: World Football
Rules for classification: 1) Points; 2) Goal average; 3) Goals scored

=== FA Cup ===
Arsenal entered the FA Cup in the third round, in which they were drawn to face Carlisle United.

Round	Date	Opponent	Venue	Result	Attendance	Goalscorers
R3	6 January 1951	Carlisle United	H	0–0	57,932	
R3 R	11 January 1951	Carlisle United	A	4–1	21,215	Logie, Goring, Lewis (2)
R4	14 January 1951	Northampton Town	H	3–2	72,408	Lewis (2), Roper
R5	10 February 1951	Manchester United	A	0–1	55,058	

== Squad statistics ==
Numbers in parentheses denote appearances as substitute.
Players with names in italics and marked * were on loan from another club for the whole of their season with Arsenal.

Pos.	Name	League		FA Cup		Friendles		Total	
Pos.	Name	Apps	Goals	Apps	Goals	Apps	Goals	Apps	Goals
GK	(England) George Swindin	21	0	0	0	8	0	29	0
GK	(England) Ted Platt	17	0	4	0	1 (2)	0	22 (2)	0
DF	(England) Walley Barnes	35	3	4	0	7	0	46	3

== See also ==
- 1950–51 in English football
- List of Arsenal F.C. seasons
