= John Moody (footballer) =

English footballer

Personal information
- Date of birth: 1 November 1904
- Place of birth: Heeley, Sheffield, England
- Date of death: 23 April 1963 (aged 58)
- Height: 5 ft 8 in (1.73 m)
- Position: Goalkeeper

Senior career*
| Years | Team | Apps | (Gls) |
| 1925–1928 | Arsenal | 6 | (0) |
| 1928–1930 | Bradford Park Avenue | | |
| 1930–1931 | Doncaster Rovers | | |
| 1931–1933 | Manchester United | 50 | (0) |
| 1933–1939 | Chesterfield | | |
- * Club domestic league appearances and goals

John Moody (1 November 1904 – 23 April 1963) was an English footballer. His regular position was as a goalkeeper.

Moody was born in Heeley, Sheffield and first played in local football in the Sheffield Amateur League. He was signed by Herbert Chapman's Arsenal in August 1925 but was initially fourth-choice goalkeeper behind Jock Robson, Bill Harper and Dan Lewis. He didn't make his first team debut for nearly two years, it coming in a 3–2 defeat away to Bury on 4 May 1927. Moody went on to keep goal in the final match of 1926-27, a 4-0 North London derby win, and covered for Lewis the following season in four matches while the latter was injured; his final game was a 6–4 defeat at Sheffield United on 7 January 1928.

After just six games in three years at Arsenal, Moody moved to Bradford Park Avenue in the 1928 close season. He spent two years at Bradford before stints at Doncaster Rovers, Manchester United and finally Chesterfield, winning the Third Division North title in 1935-36.
