= Neave (surname) =

Neave is a surname. Notable people with the surname include:

- Airey Neave (1916–1979), British soldier, barrister and politician assassinated by a car bomb
- Alida Neave, South African tennis player who reached the doubles finals in the 1929 French championship
- Bruce Neave (born 1949), Australian footballer
- Caroline Neave (1781–1863), British philanthropist and penal reformer
- Colin Neave (born 1943), Australian business executive
- David Neave (1883–1???), Scottish footballer
- Diana Neave (1919–1992), English baroness
- Dorina Neave (1880–1955), British author
- Geordie Neave (fl. 1895–1896), English footballer
- Guy Neave (born 1941), British social scientist and professor
- Julius Neave (1919–2008), English insurance executive
- Lizzie Neave (born 1987), British slalom canoeist in women's kayak; 2009 world champion
- Marcia Neave (born 1944), judge of the Supreme Court of Victoria (Australia) and academic
- Mark Neave (born 1980), English cricketer
- Sir Richard Neave, 1st Baronet (1731–1814), British merchant and a Governor of the Bank of England
- Richard Neave (born c. 1936), forensic artist
- Rikki Neave (1988–1994), English male murder victim
- Sheffield Airey Neave (1879–1961), British naturalist and entomologist
- Sheffield Neave (1799–1868), English merchant and Governor of the Bank of England
- Vera Neave (born 1893), British swimmer
- Victoria Neave (born 1980), American attorney and politician
- William Neave (c.1662–1713), Irish barrister, politician and law officer

== See also ==
- Neaves
