= Pat Flanagan =

Pat or Patrick Flanagan may refer to:

- Pat Flanagan (English footballer) (born 1891), English footballer
- Pat Flanagan (Gaelic footballer), Gaelic football manager and former player
- Pat Flanagan (sportscaster) (1893–1963), American baseball announcer
- Patrick Flanagan (born 1944), inventor of the Neurophone
- Patrick Flanagan (tug of war), American tug of war athlete
