= Duncan McDonald (Scottish footballer) =

Scottish footballer

Personal information
- Full name: Duncan McDonald
- Place of birth: Bo'ness, Scotland
- Position: Full back

Youth career
- Townside

Senior career*
Years	Team	Apps	(Gls)
1909–1911	Woolwich Arsenal	26	(0)
- West Hartlepool
- * Club domestic league appearances and goals

Duncan McDonald was a Scottish footballer, who played as a right-sided full back

Born in Bo'ness, McDonald started his career with Townside F.C.|Townside before joining Woolwich Arsenal in April 1909, but had to wait until 30 October 1909 to make his debut, against Manchester United. After that, he was a near ever-present in the 1909–10 season, with Archie Gray out of form and Joe Shaw moving to left back to cover, leaving a vacancy at right-back. However, in 1910–11 Gray forced his way back in and McDonald only played one league game all season.

McDonald played 27 times for Arsenal in total, before leaving in the summer of 1911 for West Hartlepool.
