= Archie Cross =

English footballer

Personal information
- Full name: Arthur George Cross
- Date of birth: 1880
- Place of birth: Dartford, Kent, England
- Date of death: After 1910
- Position: Right back

Senior career*
Years	Team	Apps	(Gls)
–1900	Dartford		
1900–1910	Woolwich Arsenal	132	(0)
1910–????	Dartford		
- * Club domestic league appearances and goals

Arthur George "Archie" Cross (1880 – after 1909) was an English footballer.

Cross was born in Dartford, Kent and started his career at Dartford F.C., before joining nearby Woolwich Arsenal in April 1900. A right back, he was initially the understudy to Duncan McNichol, but made his debut in a 1–1 draw with Blackpool on 6 October 1900. After playing just three games in 1900–01, he played in fifteen of Arsenal's first nineteen games of 1901–02, before losing his place again to McNichol. After another season as backup, he finally won a regular place in the side in 1903–04, during which Arsenal won promotion to the First Division for the first time in their history.

However, after Arsenal were promoted they signed his namesake Archie Gray, and Gray was included in the Arsenal side at the expense of Cross, who only played in just over a third of Arsenal's matches in their first three seasons in the top flight. In 1907 he switched sides to left back but was mainly use in the position as cover for the first-choice left back, Joe Shaw. Despite being only a reserve for much of his latter career, he was picked for an England trial in 1906, but never made it to the senior side. Cross left Woolwich Arsenal in 1910, with 149 appearances in league and cup to his name, although he never scored for the Reds. After leaving Arsenal, he saw out his career with a second spell at Dartford.
