= Neave =

Neave may refer to:

== Places ==
- Neave, Kentucky, an unincorporated community
- Neave Township, Darke County, Ohio
- Neave Island, off the coast of northern Scotland

== Other uses ==
- Neave (surname)
- Neave baronets, a title in the Baronetage of Great Britain
- Neave Brown (1929–2018), British architect

== See also ==
- Neaves, a surname
