= Archie Gray (footballer, born 1877) =

Scottish footballer

Personal information
- Full name: Archibald Gray
- Date of birth: 18 April 1877
- Place of birth: Cadder, Scotland
- Date of death: 29 July 1943 (aged 66)
- Place of death: Paisley, Scotland
- Height: 5 ft 7 in (1.70 m)
- Position: Defender

Youth career
- Govan Columbia

Senior career*
Years	Team	Apps	(Gls)
- Ashfield
1899–1904	Hibernian	51	(2)
1904–1912	Woolwich Arsenal	184	(0)
1912–1915	Fulham	25	(0)

International career
1903	Scottish League XI	1	(0)
1903	Scotland	1	(0)
- * Club domestic league appearances and goals

Archibald Gray (18 April 1877 – 29 July 1943) was a Scottish footballer who played as a defender.

Having lived in several places in the vicinity of Glasgow during his childhood, Gray began his career at Govan Columbia juveniles and Ashfield in the junior leagues, before joining Edinburgh side Hibernian in 1899. He spent five seasons with Hibs, winning the Scottish Cup in 1902. Gray made 18 league appearances and scored two goals as Hibs then won the Scottish Football League title in 1902–03. He also won his one and only cap for Scotland on 21 March 1903, against Ireland; Scotland lost 2–0. A week earlier, Gray had represented the Scottish League XI and again finished on the losing side, against the Irish League. He was given one further opportunity to impress the selectors in the Home Scots v Anglo-Scots trial match in the same month, but was injured during the match.

In the summer of 1904 Gray moved south to London to join Woolwich Arsenal, who had just been promoted to the First Division for the first time. Gray made his debut in Arsenal's very first First Division match, against Newcastle United on 3 September 1904 and immediately became the club's first-choice right back for the next five seasons; Woolwich Arsenal reached the semi-finals of the FA Cup twice (in 1905–06 and 1906–07), while in the League they usually occupied a comfortable spot in mid-table. Along with four other Gunners men – Roddy McEachrane, Tommy Hynds, Peter Kyle and Jimmy Sharp – Gray was invited to take part in the Anglo-Scots trial again in 1907, but he did not receive any further international honours subsequently (of the five, only Sharp did so).

Gray lost his regular place to fellow Scot Duncan McDonald in 1909, but he returned to the team during the 1910–11 season. He played in both full back positions, often as cover for Joe Shaw. However, having passed the age of 30 he found his place came under threat from younger players such as John Peart, and he was largely left out in the 1911–12 season. He played his final first-class match for Arseanal, his 200th, against Notts County on 23 December 1911. In spring 1912 he was transferred for £250 to Second Division Fulham, where he played 25 matches in three seasons, before his retirement in 1915. He died in a traffic accident in 1943 while working as a chauffeur.

== See also ==
- List of Arsenal F.C. players
- List of Scotland international footballers with one cap
