= Angus McKinnon =

Scottish footballer

Personal information
- Date of birth: 8 December 1886
- Place of birth: Paisley, Scotland
- Date of death: May 1968 (aged 81)
- Position: Left half

Youth career
- Petershill

Senior career*
Years	Team	Apps	(Gls)
- Carlisle United
1908–1922	(Woolwich) Arsenal	211	(4)
- * Club domestic league appearances and goals

Angus McKinnon (8 December 1886 – May 1968) was a Scottish footballer.

== Career ==
McKinnon was born in Paisley and started his career at junior side Petershill before moving south of the border to join Carlisle United, then of the Lancashire Combination. He then moved even further south, joining London side Woolwich Arsenal in May 1908. Initially a reserve player, McKinnon made his debut on 12 December 1908 in a 4–1 defeat at the hands of Bradford City, and only made one more appearance in the 1908–09 season. He mainly played at left half, as an understudy to fellow Scot Roddy McEachrane, and it wasn't until 1911 did McKinnon supplant his countryman and become a regular in the Woolwich Arsenal side.

McKinnon was a regular from then on, until official competition was suspended, a period with injury between March and November 1914 excepted. Unfortunately for him, his career with Woolwich Arsenal coincided with their relegation from the First Division in 1913; nevertheless he continued to serve Arsenal (as they had been renamed following their move to Highbury in 1913) as they pushed for promotion.

On the issue of the name the volume "Woolwich Arsenal the club that changed football" traces the changes of the club's name and reports that for the 1914/15 season the club defined itself in the programmes and elsewhere as "The Arsenal" (not Arsenal) for the first time on 10 April 1914 but that name was not registered and that formally with the Board of Trade or the Joint Stock Companies, as would have been required to make the change official.

During the war he served as a driver in the Royal Field Artillery, and returned to play for Arsenal, who had been elected back to the First Division, once competitive football resumed in 1919. Although by this time 32, he continued to play for Arsenal for another two seasons, and started the 1921–22 season as first-choice left half, before being replaced by the young Tom Whittaker.

McKinnon was given a free transfer in the summer of 1922, having played 217 matches for Arsenal, scoring 4 goals. He signed for Charlton Athletic, where he played one season, and then moved to Wigan Borough but did not play a single league match for the club and retired in 1923. After retiring, he joined New Brighton; he spent 27 years at the club, between 1935 and 1962, as either trainer or coach. He died in 1968, at the age of 81.
