= John McNicol =

Scottish footballer

Personal information
- Full name: John McNicol
- Date of birth: 22 August 1863
- Place of birth: Bonhill, Scotland
- Date of death: 7 July 1933 (aged 69–70)
- Position: Wing half

Senior career*
Years	Team	Apps	(Gls)
1889–1892	Vale of Leven	29	(0)
1894–1897	Dumbarton	8	(0)
- * Club domestic league appearances and goals

John McNicol (22 August 1863 – 7 July 1933) was a Scottish footballer who played for Vale of Leven and Dumbarton.

His younger brother Duncan McNicol was also a footballer.
