= Charlie Jones (footballer, born 1899) =

Welsh footballer (1899–1966)

Personal information
- Date of birth: 12 December 1899
- Place of birth: Troedyrhiw, Merthyr Tydfil, Wales
- Date of death: 1966 (aged 66–67)
- Height: 5 ft 7 in (1.70 m)
- Positions: Left winger; right half

Senior career*
Years	Team	Apps	(Gls)
1920–1921	Cardiff City	1	(0)
1921–1923	Stockport County	48	(9)
1923–1925	Oldham Athletic	68	(5)
1925–1928	Nottingham Forest	100	(22)
1928–1934	Arsenal	176	(8)

International career
1926–1933	Wales	8	(0)

Managerial career
- 1934–1935: Notts County
- * Club domestic league appearances and goals

Charles Jones (12 December 1899 – April 1966) was a Welsh international footballer.

Born in Troedyrhiw, Merthyr Tydfil, Jones started his career at Cardiff City, but was released in the summer of 1921 after just one appearance, a 1–0 defeat to Stoke City. He joined Stockport County, and in his first season at the club (1921–22) won a Third Division North medal and promotion to the Second Division. He moved in March 1923 to First Division Oldham Athletic, but the club were relegated to the Second Division soon after he joined; Jones spent another two seasons with the Latics in the second flight, and then joined fellow Second Division side Nottingham Forest in the summer of 1925.

Jones steadily made a name for himself as a talented left winger with Forest, making over 100 appearances for them in three years. It was also while there that he picked up the first of his eight caps for Wales, excelling in a 3–1 victory over England at Selhurst Park on 1 March 1926. In addition, he went on to captain his country several times.

Jones was signed by Herbert Chapman for Arsenal in May 1928, and often played as one of the forwards as Chapman introduced the WM formation. He missed only three league games in 1929–30, although he was not selected for the Gunners' 1930 FA Cup-winning side.

However, Jones proved his versatility by moving to right half, and became known as a tenacious ball-winner and committed tackler in the Arsenal midfield. With Arsenal he won three First Division winners' medals (in 1930–31, 1932–33 and 1933–34), and played in the 1931–32 FA Cup final (which Arsenal lost controversially to Newcastle United). He also won the FA Charity Shield in 1931 and 1933. Towards the end of his career his age was starting to catch up with him, and competition for midfield places was fierce; with players such as Bob John and Frank Hill in the Arsenal squad, Jones only played 16 matches in 1932–33. However his knowledge of the game and tactical sense were still appreciated by Arsenal managers Herbert Chapman and Joe Shaw; this meant he was a regular in the 1933–34 season, at the end of which he retired from the game, at the age of 34. In all he played 195 games for Arsenal, scoring eight goals.

Jones was manager of Notts County from May 1934 to December 1935.

== Honours ==
Arsenal

- FA Cup runner-up: 1931–32
