= John Anderson (footballer, born 1878) =

English footballer

Personal information
- Full name: John William Anderson
- Date of birth: 1878
- Place of birth: County Durham, England
- Date of death: After 1903
- Position: Half-back

Senior career*
Years	Team	Apps	(Gls)
- Crook Town
1896–1903	Woolwich Arsenal	144	(10)
1903–1904	Portsmouth	8	(0)
- * Club domestic league appearances and goals

John William Anderson (1878 – after 1903) was an English footballer.

== Career ==
Most likely born in County Durham, Anderson started out at non-league Crook Town before turning professional and joining Woolwich Arsenal in December 1896. He soon made his debut, in a Second Division match away to Darwen on 1 January 1897, which Arsenal lost 4–1. He was a mainstay for the rest of the 1896–97 season, playing all three half back positions; his continued versatility meant he remained a regular in the Arsenal side for the next five years.

Anderson's best season for Woolwich Arsenal was 1900–01, where he only missed two league fixtures all season, though he was still being used as a utility man across midfield, without making any single position his own. He continued to be a regular for another season but after the arrival of Roddy McEachrane in 1902, he was squeezed out of the Woolwich Arsenal side; he only played eight games in 1902–03 and left the club at the end of that season. In total he played 153 games for Arsenal, scoring eleven goals. He later joined Southern League Portsmouth; he is not to be confused, however, with the John Anderson who played for Portsmouth in the 1930s.
