= Middlecliffe =

Hamlet in South Yorkshire, England

Coordinates: 53°32′30″N 01°21′00″W

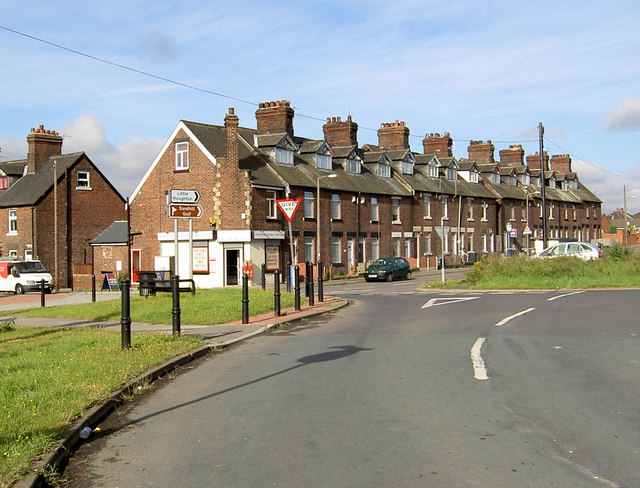
A row of houses in Middlecliffe

Middlecliffe is a small hamlet in South Yorkshire, England. It straddles the road between Darfield and Great Houghton, close to Barnsley, where Middlecliff Lane joins the B6273 road. The hamlet falls within the Darfield Ward of Barnsley MBC. It is mostly a collection of current and former council houses, small corner shop, a Working Mans Club and a sports ground – home to Houghton Main CC and FC. Middlecliffe is the birthplace of footballer Wilf Copping, who played for Leeds United, Arsenal and was capped 20 times for England.
