= Charlie Preedy =

English footballer

Personal information
- Date of birth: 11 January 1900
- Place of birth: Neemuch, Madhya Pradesh, India
- Date of death: 28 February 1978 (aged 78)
- Place of death: Lakenheath, Suffolk, England
- Position: Goalkeeper

Senior career*
Years	Team	Apps	(Gls)
1924–1928	Charlton Athletic	131	(0)
1928–1929	Wigan Borough	41	(0)
1929–1933	Arsenal	37	(0)
1933–1934	Bristol Rovers	39	(0)
1934–	Luton Town		
–1935	Margate		
- * Club domestic league appearances and goals

Charles James Fane Preedy (11 January 1900 – February 1978) was an English football goalkeeper.

One of six children, Preedy was born in Neemuch, British India, where his father was serving with the Royal Artillery. The family returned to Eltham, London, in 1907 where he attended Gordon School. He began playing football as a youth, turning professional in 1924 with Third Division South Charlton Athletic, where he became the club's regular keeper and made 131 league appearances in four seasons. In a Football League Management Committee Meeting in May 1928, Preedy was removed from retained to transfer list.

Preedy moved to Wigan Borough in 1928 and spent a single season there, playing 41 league matches, before moving to Arsenal in May 1929. He was not initially the Gunners' first team goalkeeper, instead mainly playing as understudy to Dan Lewis, Arsenal's regular keeper. Preedy made his Arsenal debut on 7 September 1929, against Sheffield Wednesday, and kept a clean sheet as Arsenal won 2–0.

Preedy kept his place after that match but was dropped after a 2–5 defeat to Aston Villa in November. After that, he was often left out of the team in favour of Lewis, but after Lewis was injured in a 6–6 draw against Leicester City, Preedy was picked to play in the FA Cup Final against Huddersfield Town at Wembley Stadium. Preedy kept a clean sheet and Arsenal won the match 2–0 in front of 100,000 spectators, the first of Arsenal's many successes over the years. He was presented with his winner's medal by King George V.

Arsenal manager Herbert Chapman was never happy with any of his goalkeepers and in an attempt to fill the role signed both Gerard Keizer and Bill Harper in the 1930 close season, and then Frank Moss a year later. Despite intense competition for the goalkeeper's place, Preedy made 25 appearances in the 1930–31 and 1931–32 seasons, but not enough to win a League Championship medal in the former.

After an entire season spent as Moss's understudy, Preedy left Arsenal for Bristol Rovers in 1933, having played 40 matches for the Gunners. After a season with Rovers he moved to Luton Town and finished his career with non-league Margate in 1935. He then followed in the footsteps of his elder brother Jack and became a London taxi driver. He died in 1978 at age 75.

== Honours ==
Arsenal

- FA Cup: 1929–30
- FA Charity Shield: 1931
