= David Neave =

Scottish footballer

Personal information
- Date of birth: 1883
- Place of birth: Arbroath, Scotland
- Date of death: Unknown
- Position: Left winger

Senior career*
Years	Team	Apps	(Gls)
- Forfar Athletic
- Montrose
- Arbroath
1904–1905	Woolwich Arsenal	3	(0)
1905	Leyton		
1905–1912	Woolwich Arsenal	151	(30)
1912–????	Merthyr Town		
- * Club domestic league appearances and goals

David Neave (born 1883) was a Scottish footballer.

== Career ==
Neave was born in Arbroath and first played for Forfar Athletic, Montrose and then Arbroath. In March 1904 he moved south of the border to join newly promoted Woolwich Arsenal. A left-winger, in his first season (1904-05) he was understudy to both Charlie Satterthwaite and Bobby Templeton and only played three league matches, his debut coming in a First Division match against Small Heath on 3 December 1904. Disgruntled, he left to join Leyton in May 1905, but by the end of the year had returned to Woolwich Arsenal.

In his second spell, Neave had more luck and by the start of the 1906-07 season he was a first-choice, as Woolwich Arsenal reached the FA Cup semi-finals, losing 3-1 to The Wednesday and seventh place in the League.

Neave continued to play for the next three season for Woolwich Arsenal as a near ever-present, though their form gradually tailed off and in 1909-10 they finished 18th; that season Neave was the club's top scorer, albeit with only five goals.

By then, Neave had been made to share the left wing position with Charles Lewis; he had only played in half the matches of Arsenal's 1909-10 campaign. This continued for the next two seasons, and by 1912 he was forced to be understudy to Lewis. Unhappy, he left Woolwich Arsenal in July 1912 to sign for Merthyr Town. In all he played 168 matches for Arsenal, scoring 32 goals. His fate after playing for Merthyr is unknown.
