= Wilf Copping =

English footballer and manager (1909–80)

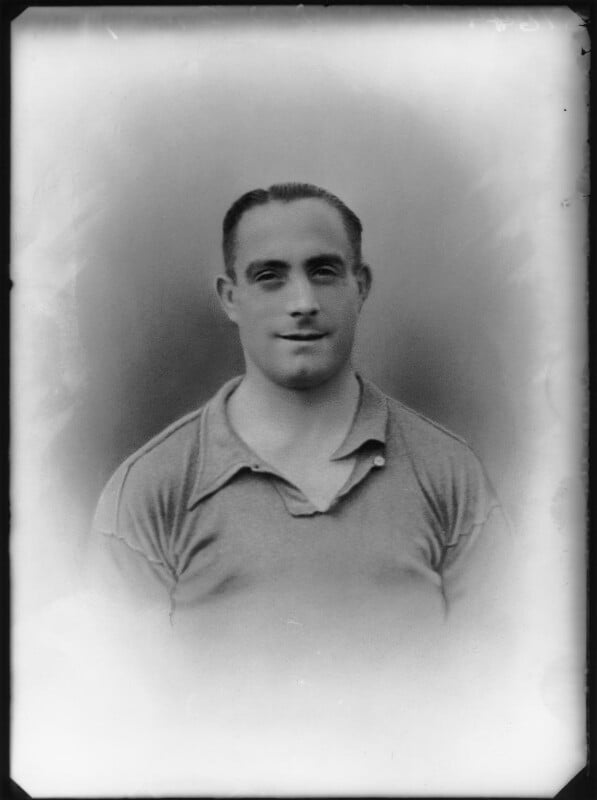
- Copping in 1936

Personal information
- Full name: Wilfred Copping
- Date of birth: 17 August 1909
- Place of birth: Barnsley, Yorkshire, England
- Date of death: June 1980 (aged 70)
- Place of death: Southend-on-Sea, Essex, England
- Positions: Left half; centre half

Senior career*
Years	Team	Apps	(Gls)
1929–1934	Leeds United	162	(0)
1934–1939	Arsenal	189	(0)
1939–1942	Leeds United	12	(0)
Total		363	(0)

International career
1933–1939	England	20	(0)

Managerial career
- 1946–1947: K. Beerschot V.A.C.
- * Club domestic league appearances and goals

Wilfred Copping (17 August 1909 – June 1980) was an English football player who played for Leeds United, Arsenal and the England national team.

== Career ==
=== Leeds United ===
Copping was born in Middlecliffe, Barnsley, Yorkshire, but was rejected by his local team Barnsley, and worked for a time in the pits while playing for Middlecliffe Rovers. He eventually joined Leeds United in 1929, and made his debut at the start of the 1930-31 season, soon becoming a regular in the Leeds half-back line.

Together with his Leeds United teammate Billy Furness, he made his debut for England, against Italy on 13 May 1933. Copping played over 160 League games for Leeds in five seasons, and won six England caps during that time.

=== Arsenal ===
Copping was signed by Arsenal in the summer of 1934 for £8,000, as a replacement for Bob John, and immediately took a first-team place at left half. He made his debut against Portsmouth on 25 August 1934, and was an ever-present in his first season for the club, until suffering a serious knee injury in the third-last match of the season against Everton. Copping soldiered on and remained on the pitch to ensure Arsenal won the game 2–0; this ensured the club won the 1934-35 First Division title.

Copping recovered from his injury to continue playing for Arsenal, making over 35 appearances in each of his first four seasons with the club. During his time at Highbury, Arsenal won the FA Cup in 1935-36, another League title in 1937-38, and two Charity Shields. His England career also continued, and he was one of seven Arsenal players to start England's match against Italy in November 1934 (the "Battle of Highbury") - a game for which he named man of the match. In total he won 20 caps for England between 1933 and 1939.

He remained a near-ever present for Arsenal until March 1939; with World War II looming, Copping put in a transfer request so that he could return to the North with his family. Arsenal duly complied, and Copping re-signed for Leeds United. In all he played 189 matches for Arsenal.

=== Return to Leeds United ===
Copping played out the rest of the 1938-39 season with Leeds United, but war broke out in September 1939 and all first-class football was cancelled. Copping joined the Army at the start of the war, and served in North Africa, eventually becoming a sergeant major. He played the occasional wartime game for Leeds, but retired from playing football in 1942.

Copping was known as a hard and strong player; his most famous quote was "the first man in a tackle never gets hurt". Despite his nickname of "The Iron Man", and his image (he took to the field unshaven, a remarkably unusual practice at the time), Copping was never booked or sent off in his career.

=== Later career ===
After the war ended, Copping became a trainer and coach at various clubs, including Beerschot in Belgium, Southend United, Bristol City and Coventry City. He retired to live in Southend-on-Sea. He died in 1980, aged 70.

In 1998, the Football League, as part of its centenary season celebrations, included Copping on its list of 100 League Legends.

== Honours ==
Arsenal

- Football League First Division: 1934–35, 1937–38
- FA Cup: 1935–36
- FA Charity Shield: 1934, 1938
