= Neaves =

Neaves is a surname. Notable people with the surname include:

- Alan Neaves (1925–2022), Australian public servant, lawyer and judge
- Charles Neaves, Lord Neaves (1800–1876), Scottish advocate, judge, theologian and writer
- Kevon Neaves (born 1985), Trinidad and Tobago footballer
- Rebecca Neaves (born 1997), Australian rules footballer

== See also ==
- Neave (disambiguation)
- Neves (surname)
