= Ben Marden =

English footballer

Personal information
- Full name: Reuben Marden
- Date of birth: 10 February 1927
- Place of birth: Fulham, England
- Date of death: 2000 (aged 72–73)
- Position: Forward

Senior career*
Years	Team	Apps	(Gls)
1949	Chelmsford City	62	(18)
1950–1955	Arsenal	42	(11)
1955–1957	Watford	41	(11)
- Bedford Town
Total		145	(40)
- * Club domestic league appearances and goals

Reuben "Ben" Marden (2 February 1927 – 2000) was an English footballer who played in the Football League for Arsenal and Watford.
