= Ernest Williamson =

English footballer

Personal information
- Full name: Ernest Clarke Williamson
- Date of birth: 24 May 1890
- Place of birth: Murton, England
- Date of death: 30 April 1964 (aged 73)
- Place of death: Norwich, England
- Height: 5 ft 10 in (1.78 m)
- Position: Goalkeeper

Senior career*
Years	Team	Apps	(Gls)
- Murton Red Star
- Wingate Albion
1913–1916	Croydon Common	65	(0)
1916–1923	Arsenal	105	(0)
1923–1925	Norwich City	43	(0)

International career
1923	England	2	(0)
- * Club domestic league appearances and goals

Ernest Clarke Williamson (24 May 1890 – 30 April 1964) was an English football goalkeeper.

== Career ==
Born in Murton, County Durham, Williamson began his career at local sides before moving to London in 1913 to join Croydon Common. During World War I he served in the Royal Army Service Corps and also turned out for various teams as a guest, including over 120 appearances for Arsenal. After the war ended, Williamson officially signed for Arsenal, who had just been promoted to the First Division, for a £150 fee. After sharing the keeper's jersey with Stephen Dunn in 1919–20 he made it his own the following season, playing 33 of the Gunners' 42 matches in 1920–21, and only missing one match the season after that.

His consistency for Arsenal brought the attention of the England selectors, and he became Arsenal's first post-First World War international, playing in both of England's matches away to Sweden on 21 May and 24 May 1923. However, by this time his Arsenal place was under threat; after conceding fourteen goals first in five matches during 1922–23 he had been dropped in favour of Dunn, and later Jock Robson. In June 1923 he left Arsenal for free to go to Norwich City. In all he played 113 official first-class matches for Arsenal, in addition to his unofficial wartime matches.

After playing for Division Three South Norwich for two seasons, Williamson retired from football altogether in 1925. He died in 1964, aged 73.

== Career statistics ==
Club	Season	League			FA Cup		Total	
Club	Season	Division	Apps	Goals	Apps	Goals	Apps	Goals
Croydon Common	1913–14	Southern League Second Division	30	0	1	0	31	0
Croydon Common	1914–15	Southern League First Division	35	0	2	0	37	0
Croydon Common	Total		65	0	3	0	68	0
Arsenal	1919–20	First Division	26	0	1	0	27	0
Arsenal	1920–21	First Division	33	0	1	0	34	0
Arsenal	1921–22	First Division	41	0	6	0	47	0
Arsenal	1922–23	First Division	5	0	0	0	5	0
Arsenal	Total		105	0	8	0	113	0
Career total			170	0	11	0	181	0
