= Gerrit Keizer =

Dutch footballer (1910–1980)

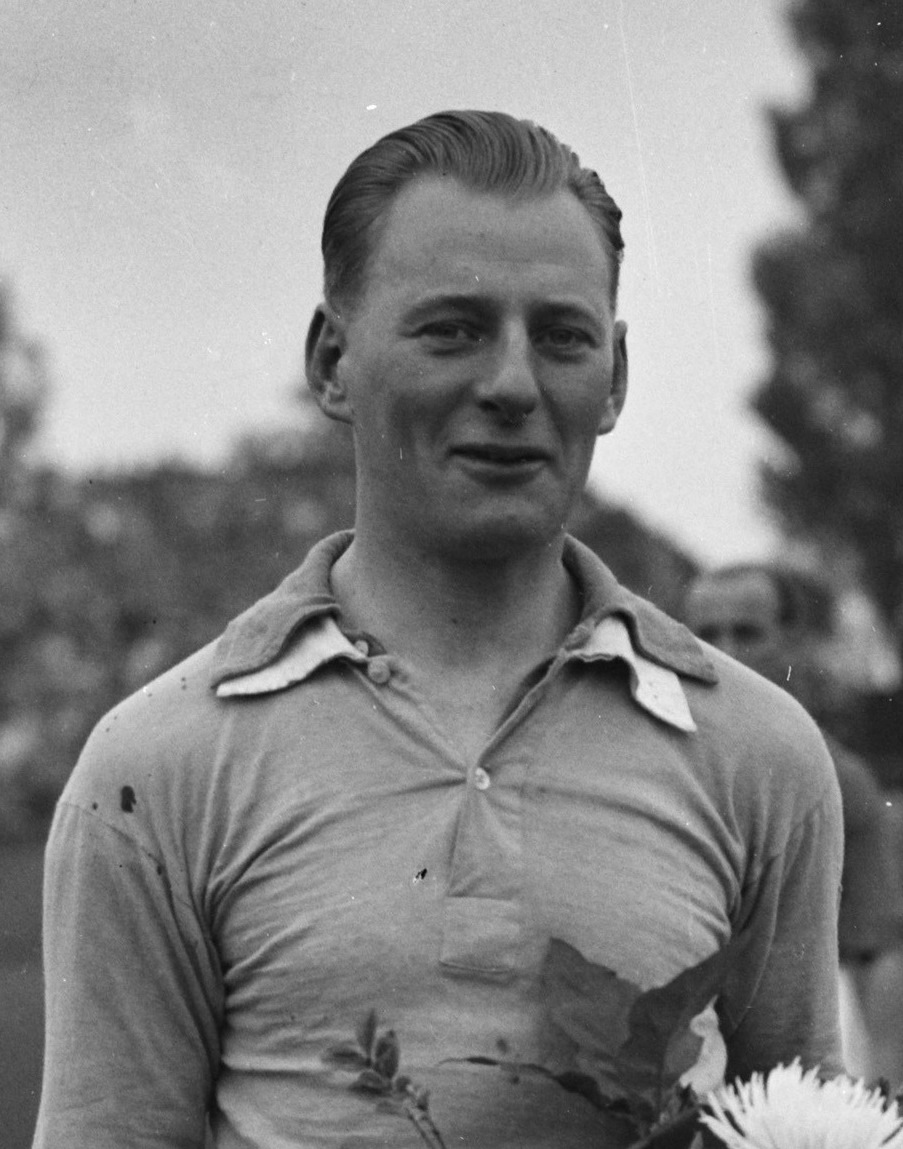
- Keizer in 1946

Personal information
- Full name: Gerard Pieter Keizer
- Date of birth: 18 August 1910
- Place of birth: Amsterdam, Netherlands
- Date of death: 5 December 1980 (aged 70)
- Place of death: Amsterdam, Netherlands
- Height: 1.88 m (6 ft 2 in)
- Position: Goalkeeper

Youth career
- 1918–1926: DEO Amsterdam
- 1926–1929: Ajax

Senior career*
Years	Team	Apps	(Gls)
1929	Ajax	4	(0)
1929–1930	Margate	47	(0)
1930–1931	Arsenal	12	(0)
1931–1932	Charlton Athletic	17	(0)
1932–1933	QPR	29	(0)
1933–1948	Ajax	298	(0)
Total		407	(0)

International career
1934	Netherlands	2	(0)
- * Club domestic league appearances and goals

Gerard Pieter "Gerrit" Keizer (8 August 1910 – 5 December 1980), also known as Gerard Keyser, was a Dutch footballer who played as a goalkeeper. Keizer was highly successful in Holland whilst playing with AFC Ajax. He was also the original "Flying Dutchman" at English side Arsenal, whom he helped to their first league title in English football.

== Club career ==
Keizer joined Ajax Amsterdam at the age of 16, and two years later made his debut for the side, against Stormvogels on 1 April 1929. For the first few years of his career he deputised for Ajax's No. 1 Jan de Boer. In 1930, he made a move to England.

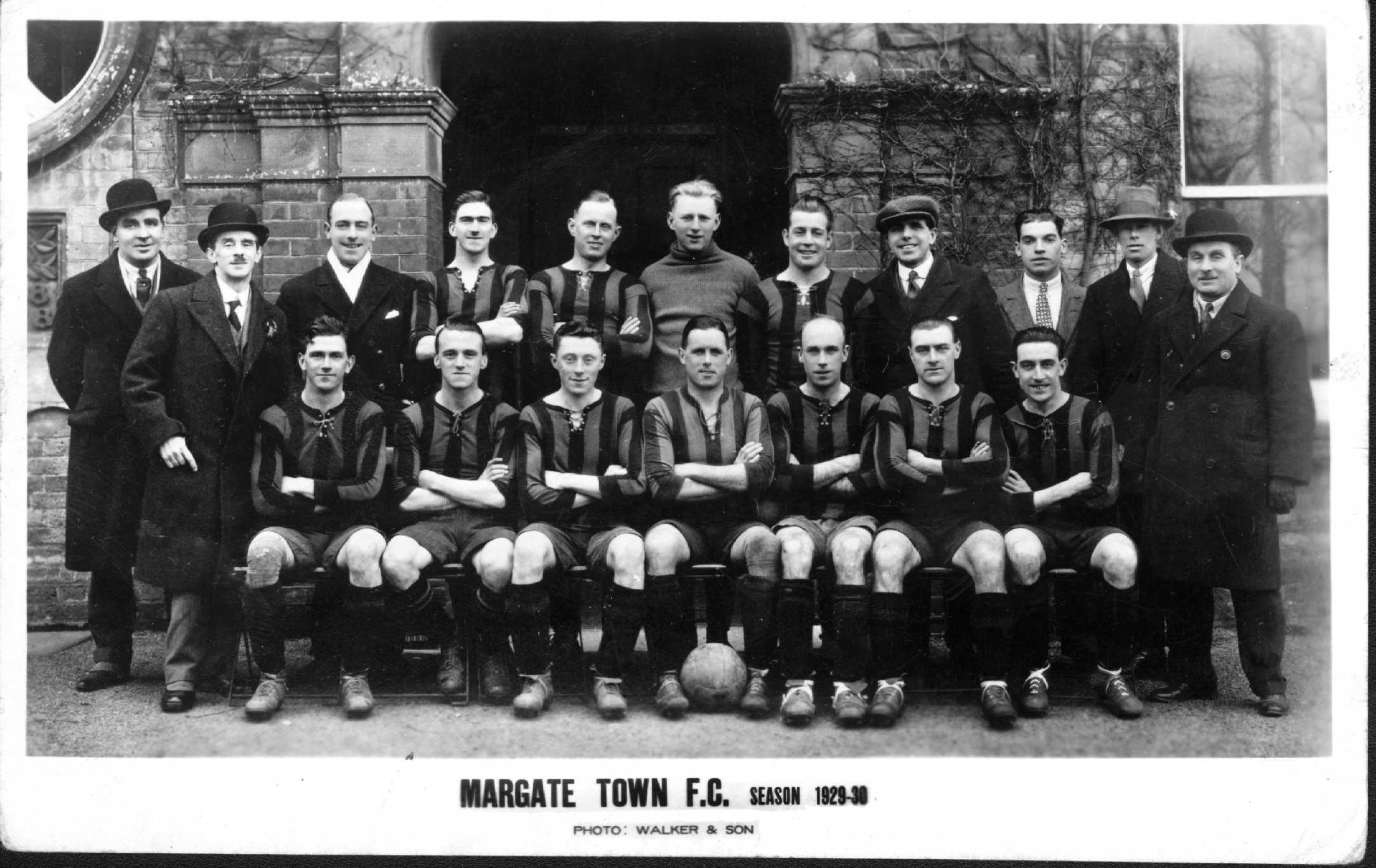
Keizer in the Margate team of 1929–1930

Keizer at first played for Kent side Margate. Keizer was outstanding for Margate, and soon Keizer was spotted by Arsenal's manager, Herbert Chapman. Keizer was at once pitched into Arsenal's first team, and made his club debut against Blackpool on 30 August 1930. He also featured in the Gunners' 2–1 1930 Charity Shield victory over Sheffield Wednesday. He went on to play in Arsenal's first twelve First Division matches of the 1930–31 season. With the Gunners, Keizer went on to win the First Division title of 1930–31. This victory was Arsenal's first ever league title.

Keizer's playing style was distinctly flamboyant, to the point of at times erratic. With stiff competition coming from Arsenal's other keepers, Bill Harper and Charlie Preedy, Keizer lost his regular spot within the side. He thus left Arsenal in July 1931 for Charlton Athletic. Keizer later played for club Queens Park Rangers.

Keizer finally returned to Amsterdam in 1933 to become Ajax's number one keeper. He eventually played over 300 matches for Ajax, becoming a club legend. A pair of his goalkeeping boots are as so on display within Ajax's museum.

== International career ==
Keizer was capped for the Netherlands national team on two occasions. His debut for Ons Oranje came in a qualifier against Belgium, a 4–2 win that took the Netherlands to the 1934 FIFA World Cup. However, Keizer was not picked for the squad that actually went to the tournament.

== Personal life ==
After the war, Ajax found themselves in deep financial trouble and so were not able to afford their own kits. Keizer flew to London to ask his old club Arsenal for help, who obligingly donated a set of kits and footballs.

Ajax thus played some matches in Arsenal's red and white shirts. Keizer continued to repeatedly journey across the Channel, but in 1947, he was discovered to be smuggling British banknotes within leather footballs; he was fined 30,000 guilders and sentenced to six months imprisonment.

Afterwards, Keizer went into business and became one of Amsterdam's leading greengrocers. In 1955, he returned to Ajax, this time as a member of the club's board. He died in 1980, aged 70.

== Honours ==
Arsenal

- Charity Shield: 1930
- First Division: 1930–31

Ajax

- Dutch overall champion 1934, 1937, 1939, 1947
- NVB Cup 1943
- Arol Cup 1934, 1941
