= Percy Sands =

English footballer

Personal information
- Full name: Percy Robert Sands
- Date of birth: 1881
- Place of birth: Norwood, London, England
- Date of death: 1965 (aged 83–84)
- Height: 5 ft 10 1/2 in (1.79 m)
- Position: Centre half

Senior career*
Years	Team	Apps	(Gls)
1902–1919	(Woolwich) Arsenal	327	(10)
1919–?	Southend United		
- * Club domestic league appearances and goals

Percy Robert Sands (1881 – December 1965) was an English footballer, who spent seventeen years playing for Arsenal, making him one of the club's most enduring servants.

Born in Norwood, London, Sands trained as a teacher in Cheltenham and also turned out for Cheltenham Town while in the town. He joined Woolwich Arsenal (as they were then known) as an amateur in 1902. While still an amateur, he became the club's first-choice centre half in 1903–04, having made his debut against Blackpool on 5 September 1903. He would not turn fully professional for another three years, and would still work as a teacher when not playing.

Woolwich Arsenal were promoted to the First Division in 1904, and Sands was a near ever-present in the side. Although Arsenal were an undistinguished mid-table side at this time, they reached the FA Cup semi-finals two years running, in 1905–06 and 1906–07. Nicknamed "Mr Reliable", Sands stuck with the club through leaner times, including financial difficulties and then relegation in 1912–13, by which time he had been made captain of the side, and the club's move to Highbury (and its subsequent renaming) that same year.

With the advent of World War I, first-class football was suspended, but despite his age (33), Sands continued to play for Arsenal in unofficial wartime matches. He later left to serve in the Royal Army Medical Corps on the Western Front. After peace broke out, he joined Southern League side Southend United, before retiring. In all he played 350 matches for the Gunners, a record that stood until it was broken by Bob John fifteen years later.

He was never capped for England, although he was called up for trials with the squad, and also played for the Football League representative team. He died in December 1965 aged 84.
