= Vera Neave =

British swimmer

Personal information
- Nationality: British
- Born: 1893

Sport
- Sport: swimming
- Club: Jersey Swimming Club; Enfield Ladies Club
- Coached by: David Billington her father

Vera Neave (born 1893) was a British swimmer in the early 20th century. She held multiple world records.

== Swimming ==
=== Affiliations ===
Neave was a member of the Jersey Swimming Club, where she was coached by David Billington. Later, she joined the Enfield Ladies Club in London, where her father served as her coach.

=== Achievements ===
On August 5, 1911, she became the first woman to win an open water swimming race in London. Out of 18 swimmers, 12 completed the race. Neave finished the 15-mile course in 4 hours, 9 minutes, and 39.6 seconds.

On 18 August 1912 she broke the 1 mile world record. with a time of 31: 41.8. The next year she broke the 2 miles world record with a time of 1 hour 1:15.4 minutes in a swimming pool in Liverpool. In 1915 she finished at the Traversée de Paris à la nage fifth of the twenty participants. In 1918 she holds two more world records. She is the 440 yards record holder with a time of 6:57.8 and the 550 yards world record holder with a time of 7:52. In August 1921 she again beat the 1 mile world record, now with a time of 21:41.8.
