= Bill Harper (footballer, born 1897) =

Scottish footballer

Personal information
- Full name: William Harper
- Date of birth: 19 January 1897
- Place of birth: Carnwath, Scotland
- Date of death: 12 April 1989 (aged 92)
- Place of death: Plymouth, England
- Position: Goalkeeper

Youth career
- Winchburgh Violet
- 1914: Winchburgh Thistle
- 1916: Edinburgh Emmett

Senior career*
Years	Team	Apps	(Gls)
1920–1925	Hibernian	178	(0)
1925–1927	Arsenal	42	(0)
1927–1929	Fall River	79	(0)
1929	Boston Soccer Club	4	(0)
1929	Boston Bears	21	(0)
1929–1930	New Bedford Whalers	31	(0)
1930	Fall River (guest)	0	(0)
1930–1931	Arsenal	21	(0)
1931–1939	Plymouth Argyle	78	(0)
Total		454	(0)

International career
1923–1926	Scottish League XI	2	(0)
1923–1926	Scotland	11	(0)
- * Club domestic league appearances and goals

William Harper (19 January 1897 – 12 April 1989) was a Scottish goalkeeper who played for, among others, Hibernian, Arsenal, Fall River and Plymouth Argyle. He also represented Scotland in 11 full internationals.

== Early years ==
Harper was the son of William Harper Sr., a blacksmith, and Christina Brown. Born in Lanarkshire but largely raised in Winchburgh, West Lothian, he initially followed his father into the blacksmith trade while also playing football for several junior teams. During the First World War he enlisted in the British Army and served with the 5th Brigade of the Scots Guards on the Western Front. Harper, an all-round sportsman, was brigade heavyweight boxing champion and captain of the Guards rugby union team when they won a brigade championship.

== Club career ==
=== Hibernian ===
Harper made his Scottish Football League debut for Hibernian against Airdrie on 1 September 1920. He spent five years at Easter Road, making over 200 appearances. He also played in two consecutive Scottish Cup Finals, in 1923 and 1924, but finished on the losing side on both occasions. While with Hibs he also won nine of his 11 Scotland caps and represented the Scottish League XI on two occasions.

=== Arsenal ===
In November 1925 Harper became one of Arsenal manager Herbert Chapman's first signings, joining the club for £4,000, then a record fee for a goalkeeper. He made his Arsenal debut against Bury on 14 November 1925, which Arsenal won 6–1. Harper became Arsenal's first-choice keeper straight away, displacing Jock Robson and young Welshman Dan Lewis. Harper finished 1925–26 and started 1926–27 as Arsenal's first choice keeper, but Chapman blamed Harper for a 4–2 defeat in a North London derby against Tottenham Hotspur on 18 December 1926 and ruthlessly dropped him in favour of Dan Lewis.

After three years playing in the American Soccer League, Harper rejoined Arsenal. Dan Lewis had by now left the club, and Harper became first choice over Charlie Preedy and Gerard Keizer. In his first season back at Arsenal, Harper won an English First Division winners' medal, as the club won their first ever league title in 1931. However, during the 1931–32 season Harper was dropped once again. He made his final senior league appearance for Arsenal away to Blackburn Rovers on 31 August 1931. During his two spells with Arsenal, Harper made 63 league appearances and 10 further appearances in the FA Cup.

=== American Soccer League ===
In between his two spells with Arsenal, Harper played in the American Soccer League. Between 1927 and 1929 he made 79 league appearances for Fall River He also played a further 3 games in the National Challenge Cup and 6 in the Lewis Cup and helped the 'Marksmen' win the league title during the 1928–29 season. Harper's time in the ASL coincided with both the Great Depression and the Soccer Wars, a power struggle between the ASL and the US Football Association. During this era many clubs relocated, merged or folded. Towards the end of the 1928–29 season Sam Mark, owner of the 'Marksmen', took over the struggling Boston Soccer Club and Harper then switched from the 'Marksmen' to the Boston team. By the time the Fall 1929 season started they had become the Boston Bears. When the Soccer Wars were resolved, new league rules forbid the ownership of two or more clubs and Mark's decided to sell Boston. However unable to find a buyer, he was forced to dissolve the team after just 4 games of the Spring 1930 season. Harper then joined New Bedford Whalers for the remainder of the season, making 31 league appearances. He also made a further 4 cup appearances, two in the National Challenge Cup and two in the Lewis Cup. During the summer of 1930 Harper rejoined Fall River and played in friendlies against Rangers and Kilmarnock and was a member of the 'Marksmen' squad that toured Central Europe.

=== Plymouth Argyle ===
In December 1931 Harper signed for Plymouth Argyle and went on to make 82 appearances in all competitions between then and 1939. During the Second World War he worked in the dockyards in Rosyth, Scotland. After the war he returned to Argyle where he served as a trainer, groundsman and even laundryman. Such was his contribution to the club that he was awarded a testimonial match against Arsenal in October 1972. Plymouth's training ground, Harper's Park, is also named after him.

== Scottish international ==
Between 1923 and 1926 Harper made 11 appearances for Scotland. He won his first nine caps while playing for Hibernian and his last two while with Arsenal. Harper made his international debut on 3 March 1923 in a 1–0 win against Ireland at Windsor Park. He subsequently played in all three games of the 1923, 1924 and 1925 British Home Championships and played in two of the three games in the 1926 competition. He made four appearances against Ireland, four against England and three against Wales. His record with Scotland included eight wins, two draws and just one defeat. With Harper in goal, Scotland also won the British Home Championship in 1923, 1925 and 1926 and finished as runners up in 1924. He made his last international appearance on 17 April 1926 in 1–0 win against England at Old Trafford.

== Honours ==
Scotland

- British Home Championship
  - Winners 1923, 1925, 1926 : 3
  - Runners Up 1924: 1

Hibernian

- Scottish Cup
  - Runners Up 1923, 1924: 2

Arsenal

- English First Division
  - Winners 1930–31: 1
- London Combination
  - Winners 1926–27: 1
- Northampton Charity Shield
  - Winners 1930–31: 1
- Sheriff of London Shield
  - Winners 1930–31: 1

Fall River F.C.

- American Soccer League
  - Winners 1928–29: 1
