= Doug Lishman =

English footballer

Personal information
- Full name: Douglas John Lishman
- Date of birth: 14 September 1923
- Place of birth: Birmingham, England
- Date of death: 21 December 1994 (aged 71)
- Position: Inside forward

Senior career*
Years	Team	Apps	(Gls)
- Paget Rangers
1946–1948	Walsall	59	(26)
1948–1956	Arsenal	226	(125)
1956–1957	Nottingham Forest	38	(22)

International career
1953	England B	1	(0)
- * Club domestic league appearances and goals

Douglas John Lishman (14 September 1923 – 21 December 1994) was an English footballer. Lishman, who played as an inside forward, featured for clubs Walsall, Arsenal & Nottingham Forest throughout his career. Lishman is as well Arsenal's seventh highest goalscorer of all time.

== Career ==
Born in Birmingham, Lishman first played as a centre forward for non-league Paget Rangers, before signing as a professional for Third Division South Walsall in August 1946. In two seasons with the Saddlers, Lishman scored 26 goals in 59 league appearances.

He was signed by Arsenal in the summer of 1948 for £10,500, as backup for Reg Lewis, who was only 28 but becoming ever more frequently injured. Lishman made his debut against Sheffield United on 4 September 1948, but after a promising first season (scoring 13 goals in 25 appearances), Lishman's 1949–50 and 1950–51 seasons were marred by injury. Lishman was passed over for the 1950 FA Cup Final (which Arsenal won 2–0), in favour of Lewis and Peter Goring, and then just as he came back into the Arsenal first team, he broke his leg playing against Stoke City in December 1950.

However, Lishman recovered to become Arsenal's top scorer in 1950–51, and the next season hit 30 goals, including three hat-tricks in three successive home matches; Arsenal finished third that season. The following 1951–52 season they reached the 1952 FA Cup Final, only to lose to Newcastle United; a series of injuries meant only eight fit players finished the match as no substitutes were allowed in those days. Lishman came close for Arsenal with a header, which clipped the crossbar, but Arsenal still lost the game 1–0.

Lishman's disappointment was soon forgotten, as Arsenal won the League Championship in 1952–53. Lishman was again Arsenal's top scorer, this time with 22, and with every goal proving vital as Arsenal won the title on goal average above Preston North End. His form was good enough for him to be picked for an England B match against Scotland B in March 1953, although he was never capped for the full national side.

Lishman was top scorer for another two seasons after that, making it five successive seasons as the club's top scorer in total. With younger men like Derek Tapscott and David Herd taking over goalscoring duties for Arsenal, however, Lishman was dropped from the first team in 1955–56. In all he scored 137 goals in 244 appearances, making him the club's seventh-highest goalscorer of all time.

In March 1956 he was sold to Second Division Nottingham Forest. Whilst at Forest Lishman, scored a hat-trick in a 4–0 win over Sheffield United, a win that allowed for Forest to be promoted to Division One in 1956–57. Lishman eventually decided to retire as a footballer in the summer of 1957, leaving the game entirely. He joined his father-in law in the furniture retail business in Stoke-on-Trent, later taking over the business himself. He continued to live in Stoke-on-Trent until his death in 1994.

== Honours ==
Arsenal

- Football League First Division: 1952–53
- FA Charity Shield: 1953
- FA Cup runner-up: 1951–52
