= Pat Flanagan (English footballer) =

English footballer

Personal information
- Full name: John Thomas Flanagan
- Date of birth: 20 September 1889
- Place of birth: Aston, England
- Date of death: 31 August 1917 (aged 27)
- Place of death: Mingoyo, German East Africa
- Height: 5 ft 6 in (1.68 m)
- Position: Inside forward

Youth career
- Verity's
- Stourbridge

Senior career*
Years	Team	Apps	(Gls)
1908–1909	Norwich City		
1909–1910	Fulham	11	(1)
1910–1917	Arsenal	114	(28)
- * Club domestic league appearances and goals

John Thomas Flanagan (20 September 1889 – 31 August 1917) was an English footballer.

== Career ==
While working for a bicycle manufacturer, Flanagan played youth football for Stourbridge. He turned professional with Norwich City during the 1907–08 season and moved to Fulham in 1909. In December 1910 joined Woolwich Arsenal (both clubs being owned by the same man, Sir Henry Norris, at the time). Flanagan made his debut on 11 February 1911 and over the next few seasons played in every forward position.

During the 1912–13 season Flanagan finished joint-top league goalscorer (with Charles Lewis) in the First Division. The next season 1913–14 he finished as Arsenal's top scorer with twelve league goals and one FA Cup goal, in the club's first season at Highbury. In total he had scored 28 goals in 121 league and cup appearances for Arsenal.

Flanagan was dropped by Arsenal at the end of 1914–15 and spent the next two seasons as a bit-part player during the First World War. He retired after an injury in 1917. Flanagan enlisted in the British Army under the Derby Scheme in December 1915, before returning to his reserved occupation as an artillery shell machinist at the Royal Arsenal. He was later mobilised into the Army Service Corps in February 1917 and posted to 816th M.T. Company in German East Africa. Driver Flanagan died of dysentery at the 52nd (Lowland) Casualty Clearing Station in Mingoyo on 31 August 1917.
