= Caroline Neave =

- Born: Caroline Hannah Neave; 23 March 1781
- Died: 7 December 1863 (aged 82)
- Occupation: Philanthropist

Caroline Hannah Neave (23 March 1781 — 7 December 1863) was a British philanthropist and penal reformer.

== Early life ==
Neave was born in 1781 to Richard and Frances Neave.

== Career ==
In 1822, she founded and ran Tothill Fields Asylum, a shelter for female former prisoners in Westminster after conversation with Elizabeth Fry, during which Fry lamented "Often have I known the career of a promising young woman, charged with a first offence, to end in a condemned cell!". Initially, the asylum hosted four inmates, increasing to nine by 1824. Neave joined Fry's British Ladies' Society for Promoting the Reformation of Female Prisoners after members of the group were impressed by the asylum. In 1825, Neave headed a subcommittee to establish and run Royal Manor Hall Asylum in Chelsea, an asylum for 'vicious female children' such as shoplifters that would later be taken over by Neave's Royal Female Philanthropic Society. The asylum used solitary confinement instead of corporal punishment, and prepared the children for marriage or domestic service.

Queen Victoria contributed fifty pounds to the running of Royal Manor Hall Asylum. By 1848, the Royal Manor Hall Asylum had hosted more than six hundred inmate.

In 1853, Neave gave evidence to the Select Committee on Criminal and Destitute Children.

Through her career, she also worked in prisons, refuges and convict-ships.
