= Duncan McNicol =

Scottish footballer

Personal information
- Full name: Duncan McNicol
- Date of birth: 16 January 1874
- Place of birth: Bonhill, Scotland
- Date of death: 5 March 1949 (aged 75)
- Place of death: Aberdeen, Scotland
- Position: Full-back

Senior career*
Years	Team	Apps	(Gls)
1893–1894	Vale of Leven		
1894	Darwen	1	(0)
1894–1897	Clyde	5	(0)
1897–1899	St Bernard's	18	(0)
1899–1903	Woolwich Arsenal	101	(1)
1903–1905	Aberdeen	36	(0)
- * Club domestic league appearances and goals

Duncan McNicol (16 January 1874 – 5 March 1949) was a Scottish footballer.

Born in Bonhill, Dunbartonshire, McNicol played in Scotland for local club Vale of Leven followed by Darwen in Lancashire (very briefly), Clyde in Glasgow and St Bernard's in Edinburgh, before moving south of the border to join Woolwich Arsenal in June 1899. He made his debut in a Second Division match against Leicester Fosse on 2 September 1899 and immediately became a first-team regular at left back; he played 30 out of 34 league matches in 1899–1900, which included appearing in Arsenal's 12–0 defeat of Loughborough on 12 March 1900.

He continued to feature regularly for the next two seasons, missing just five matches over the course of both 1900–01 and 1901–02. He eventually switched over to right back so Arsenal could accommodate Jimmy Jackson at left back; however the emergence of Archie Cross and a period of injury meant McNicol lost his place in 1902–03 and he eventually left Arsenal in October 1903. In total he played 112 matches, scoring one goal. He moved to Aberdeen and spent two seasons there as team captain before retiring prematurely in 1905 due to injury.

His elder brother John McNicol was also a footballer.
