= Billy Blyth =

Scottish footballer (1895–1968)

Personal information
- Full name: William Naismith Blyth
- Date of birth: 17 June 1895
- Place of birth: Dalkeith, Scotland
- Date of death: 1 July 1968 (aged 73)
- Place of death: Worthing, England
- Height: 5 ft 8 in (1.73 m)
- Positions: Left half; inside left

Youth career
- Wemyss Athletic

Senior career*
Years	Team	Apps	(Gls)
1913–1914	Manchester City	0	(0)
1914–1929	Arsenal	314	(45)
1929–1931	Birmingham	21	(4)
Total		335	(49)
- * Club domestic league appearances and goals

William Naismith Blyth (17 June 1895 – 1 July 1968), generally known as Billy Blyth, was a Scottish footballer.

Born in Dalkeith, Midlothian, Blyth played as a schoolboy for local junior side Wemyss Athletic. He was briefly on the books of Manchester City before signing for Arsenal in May 1914. He quickly made his debut for the Gunners, in a Second Division against Huddersfield Town on 21 November 1914, a game that Arsenal lost 3–0. Blyth made 12 appearances in 1914–15 but by then the First World War had broken out, and Blyth duly joined the Royal Army Service Corps, serving in France.

Upon the end of hostilities and the resumption of football in 1919, Blyth returned to Arsenal and immediately became a regular in the newly promoted side. An energetic "midfield dynamo", Blyth usually figured on the left of midfield, as a left half or inside left. He became a mainstay in the side, with over 300 league games in 10 seasons, and became club captain in 1925. He also played in the 1927 FA Cup Final, Arsenal's first cup final, which they lost 1–0 to Cardiff City. In total, he played 343 matches for Arsenal, scoring 51 goals.

He moved to Birmingham in May 1929, playing his last first-team game in September 1930 before retiring at the end of the 1930–31 season. Blyth also starred in one of the first football-related films, the 1930 production The Great Game. After retiring, Blyth moved back to Scotland, and ran a pub in Port Seton. He died in Worthing, West Sussex, England, in 1968 at the age of 73.

== Honours ==
=== Player ===
Arsenal

- FA Cup runner-up: 1926–27
