= Peter Goring =

English footballer and manager (1927–1994)

Personal information
- Date of birth: 2 January 1927
- Place of birth: Bishop's Cleeve, Gloucestershire, England
- Date of death: December 1994 (aged 67)
- Positions: Centre forward; right half

Senior career*
Years	Team	Apps	(Gls)
–1948	Cheltenham Town		
1948–1959	Arsenal	220	(51)
1959–?	Boston United		

Managerial career
- 1968–1979: Forest Green Rovers
- * Club domestic league appearances and goals

Harry "Peter" Goring (2 January 1927 – December 1994) was an English footballer.

Born in Bishop's Cleeve, Gloucestershire, one of six brothers, Goring first played for local Southern League side Cheltenham Town, making a name for himself as a prolific centre forward. In January 1948, he was signed by First Division club, Arsenal, although he spent the next eighteen months playing in the reserve side.

After impressing on the club's tour of Brazil in the summer of 1949, Goring made his first-team debut against Chelsea on 24 August 1949, when Arsenal won 2–1. In his first season, Goring was the club's second-top goalscorer, with 21 goals in 29 matches. Arsenal only finished fifth that season, but did win the FA Cup, beating Liverpool 2–0 in the final. Goring started up front but did not score.

Goring continued to play up front for the Gunners, scoring 16 times the following season, but was displaced by Cliff Holton in 1951-52, and his form noticeably dropped. He only scored five goals in 19 appearances that season. However, he fought his way back into the side in the following season, and scored ten goals in 29 appearances, with Arsenal winning the League on goal average.

However, in 1953-54 his goalscoring touch deserted him entirely, and he only played nine matches, without scoring a single goal. Arsenal manager Tom Whittaker still had faith in Goring and, after switching him to right half, Goring became a first team regular once again. He missed only six matches over the next two seasons, and was picked for a Football Association XI that toured the West Indies in the summer of 1955.

The latter years of Goring's career were affected by age and injuries. In his final three seasons at the club, between 1956 and 1959, he only played 25 times - and only twice in 1958-59 - as he gradually dropped down to the reserves. In all, he played 240 matches for Arsenal, scoring 53 goals. In the summer of 1959, Goring moved to Boston United, in a swap deal that took Alan Ashberry to Arsenal, before retiring from playing.

After retiring, Goring returned to Cheltenham to run the family butcher's shop, Wheeler & Goring on Tewkesbury Road. His other sporting love was golf and he became the golfing coach at Cleeve Hill golf course. In September 1968, Goring was appointed manager of Forest Green Rovers. He remained in charge of the club for 11 seasons, until his resignation in October 1979, during which time he took them from the Gloucestershire County League to the Hellenic League. He died in 1994, aged 67, and was buried at St Michael's church Bishop's Cleeve.

== Honours ==
Arsenal

- Football League First Division: 1952–53
- FA Cup: 1949–50
