= Jock Robson =

Scottish footballer

Personal information
- Full name: John Hardy Robson
- Date of birth: 15 April 1899
- Place of birth: Innerleithen, Tweeddale, Scotland
- Date of death: 1995 (aged 95–96)
- Position: Goalkeeper

Senior career*
Years	Team	Apps	(Gls)
?–1921	Vale of Leithen	?	(?)
1921–1926	Arsenal	97	(0)
1926-?	Bournemouth & Boscombe Athletic	42	(0)
	Montrose	?	(?)
- * Club domestic league appearances and goals

John Hardy Robson (15 April 1899 – 1995) was a Scottish footballer, who played as a goalkeeper.

Born in Innerleithen, Tweeddale, Robson played as a goalkeeper despite only standing at 5'8". Robson had served in the First World War with the Seaforth Highlanders; after returning home he played for local side Vale of Leithen. In November 1921, Robson was signed by Arsenal for £5, and initially was the club's third-choice goalkeeper behind Ernest Williamson and Stephen Dunn. With little experience and his lack of height, he was never expected to be thrust into the first team, but after first Williamson and then Dunn suffered poor form, Robson made his debut for Arsenal against Bolton Wanderers on 26 December 1922. Arsenal won 5-0 and Robson kept his place.

Robson played for the rest of the 1922–23 season, keeping twelve clean sheets in twenty matches, and he became an ever-present in the Arsenal side for the next season and a half; Arsenal were by no means a top side at this time, flirting dangerously with relegation in 1924 and 1925, but Robson's athletic keeping helped keep them up. However, after Welsh international Dan Lewis joined Arsenal in late 1924, Robson had to share goalkeeping duties with him.

Robson started the 1925–26 season as first-choice but after new Arsenal manager Herbert Chapman signed Bill Harper in November 1925, Robson's days at Arsenal were numbered. He made his last first-team appearance in a 5–2 win against Manchester City on 7 November 1925. After spending the rest of the season in the reserves, Robson left Arsenal in August 1926 for Bournemouth & Boscombe Athletic. In all, he played 101 matches for Arsenal.
