= Joe Shaw (footballer, born 1883) =

English footballer (1883–1963)

Personal information
- Full name: Joseph Ebenezer Shaw
- Date of birth: 7 May 1883
- Place of birth: Bury, Lancashire, England
- Date of death: September 1963 (aged 80)
- Height: 5 ft 9 in (1.75 m)
- Position: Full back

Senior career*
Years	Team	Apps	(Gls)
	Bury	?	(?)
19??–1907	Accrington Stanley	?	(?)
1907–1922	(Woolwich) Arsenal	309	(0)

Managerial career
- Jan–May 1934: Arsenal (caretaker manager)
- 1947–1956: Arsenal (assistant manager)
- * Club domestic league appearances and goals

Joseph Ebenezer Shaw (7 May 1883 – September 1963) was an English football player and coach.

== Career ==
Born in Bury, Lancashire, Shaw first played for his home club, Bury, and then Accrington Stanley, helping the side win the Lancashire Combination. Shaw then moved south to London, joining Woolwich Arsenal in 1907.

He made his debut against Preston North End on 28 September 1907, and had soon become a regular in the Arsenal side; he was first-choice left back for the next seven seasons. Although the club had shown early promise since their promotion to the First Division in 1904, with two successive FA Cup semi-final appearances in the seasons before Shaw's arrival, they soon quickly faded. After a high of sixth place in 1908-09, Woolwich Arsenal soon found themselves in trouble, and were relegated in 1912-13.

Despite this, Shaw stayed with the club as they moved across London to Highbury, and was an ever-present in the final 1914-15 season prior to first-class football being suspended for World War I. He continued to play during unofficial wartime matches, and by the time competitive football had resumed, he had made the switch to right back. In 1919 he was made Arsenal captain, succeeding the recently departed Percy Sands. By this time Arsenal were back in the First Division, and Shaw continued to play until the age of 38. In 1922 he had made his 300th first-class appearance against Newcastle United on 23 April 1921 becoming the third player in the club's history to do so, after Sands and Roddy McEachrane.

In all he played 326 matches for the club, although he never scored a goal. After retiring from playing, he became first a coach, and then manager of the Arsenal reserve side. After the unexpected death of Herbert Chapman in January 1934, Shaw became caretaker manager of the first team for the rest of the season; Shaw carried on Chapman's good work, as Arsenal won the 1933-34 League title, the third title in the club's history. After George Allison was appointed permanent first-team manager in the summer, Shaw went back to his post as reserves manager.

Shaw remained at Arsenal through the rest of the 1930s and during the Second World War. After the war ended, he had a stint as a coach at Chelsea, a spell which started at 1945 and lasted for the next two years. He then returned from Chelsea, towards Arsenal to become assistant manager to Tom Whittaker in 1947. He later served as a club ambassador and fully ended his footballing days in 1956, after 49 years' service for Arsenal. He died in 1963 at the age of 80.

== See also ==
- List of English football championship winning managers
