= Dan Lewis (footballer) =

Welsh footballer

Personal information
- Date of birth: 11 December 1902
- Place of birth: Maerdy, Rhondda, Wales
- Date of death: 1965 (aged 62–63)
- Height: 5 ft 11 in (1.80 m)
- Position: Goalkeeper

Youth career
- Maerdy

Senior career*
Years	Team	Apps	(Gls)
–1924	Clapton Orient		
1924–1931	Arsenal	142	(0)
1931–1932	Gillingham	6	(0)

International career
1927–1929	Wales	3	(0)
- * Club domestic league appearances and goals

Daniel Lewis (11 December 1902 – 1965) was a Welsh football goalkeeper, who is most notable for his time playing for Arsenal. He kept goal for Arsenal in the 1927 FA Cup Final where a mistake by him saw Cardiff City win the cup.

== Playing career ==
Born in Maerdy, Glamorgan, Lewis first played for local clubs, before moving to London and joining Clapton Orient. He also worked as a coal miner. His move to the big time came in 1924 when he joined First Division Arsenal. He made his debut for the Gunners on 15 November 1924 against Everton; Arsenal won 3–2 and Lewis remained for the next thirteen games. However, after letting in five in a match at home to Huddersfield Town on 14 February 1925, Lewis was dropped.

After Herbert Chapman arrived as Arsenal manager in 1925, Lewis shared goalkeeping duties with Jock Robson and Bill Harper, but Lewis gradually became the club's No. 1, particularly after Robson and Harper left in 1926 and 1927 respectively. He won his first cap for Wales in a 3–3 draw against England on 12 February 1927. In all he won three caps, the last of which was a 6–0 defeat by England at Stamford Bridge on 20 November 1929.

Lewis was the Arsenal goalkeeper in the 1927 FA Cup Final against Cardiff City at Wembley Stadium; it was the Gunners' first Cup final. In the 74th minute, Cardiff striker Hughie Ferguson hit a tame shot straight at Lewis, who dived down to make what should have been a comfortable save. However, Lewis fumbled the ball as he gathered it, and it slipped between his body and the crook of his elbow; Lewis turned around and tried in vain to reclaim the ball but only succeeded in knocking it with his elbow into the back of the net. Cardiff won the match 1–0, the only time a Welsh club has won the FA Cup. Lewis blamed his brand new jersey for the error, saying the wool was too greasy for him to grip the ball properly; since then, according to club legend, no Arsenal goalkeeper has played in a New Jersey before it is washed first.

Lewis continued to play as Arsenal's regular goalkeeper for the next three seasons. However, when they reached Wembley for their second Cup final in 1930, Lewis was injured in Arsenal's 6-6 semifinal tie with Leicester City. He missed the final and needed major surgery on his knee. He never fully recovered from this which effectively finished his football career. Arsenal, with Charlie Preedy in goal, beat Huddersfield 2–0 to claim their first major trophy.

Lewis hardly featured at all the following season, particularly after the signings of Bill Harper (for a second spell on a goalkeeper record fee of £4000) and Gerard Keizer. He was transferred to Gillingham in May 1931. In all he played 169 matches for Arsenal.

Lewis played only six times for Gillingham and apparently retired from professional football soon after. He died in 1965, at the age of 62.

== Honours ==
Arsenal

- FA Cup runner-up: 1926–27
