= Charles Lewis (footballer) =

English footballer

Personal information
- Full name: Charles Henry Lewis
- Date of birth: 15 August 1886
- Place of birth: Plumstead, London, England
- Date of death: 1967 (aged 80–81)
- Height: 5 ft 9 in (1.75 m)
- Positions: Centre forward; winger

Youth career
- Eltham
- Maidstone United

Senior career*
Years	Team	Apps	(Gls)
1907–1921	(Woolwich) Arsenal	206	(30)
1921–?	Margate		
- * Club domestic league appearances and goals

Charles Henry Lewis (15 August 1886 – 1967) was an English footballer.

Born in Plumstead, London, Lewis played for Eltham and then Maidstone United as a youth, before signing for Woolwich Arsenal in May 1907. A versatile forward, he was used by Arsenal in every attacking position, including centre forward and winger. Although he only made his Arsenal debut midway through his first season, against Sunderland on 28 December 1907, he finished the 1907–08 season as the club's second-top goalscorer, with eight, one behind Peter Kyle.

For the next two seasons Lewis featured regularly, playing the majority of Woolwich Arsenal's matches. However, at the time the club were struggling in the First Division, skirting relegation in 1909–10 (finishing 18th out of 20), before financial problems forced the club to sell its best players. Arsenal finished bottom of the First Division in 1912–13 having only scored 18 League goals; Lewis was Arsenal's top scorer that season, albeit with only four goals.

By now, Lewis mainly played as a supporting striker; this combined with Arsenal's poor attacking form meant he scored relatively few goals for the club. He faithfully stayed with the club (which in the meantime had moved to Highbury and renamed themselves "The Arsenal"), as they battled for promotion from the Second Division. The arrival of World War I robbed Lewis of the peak of his career; although he played in some wartime matches, by the time peace had broken out and Arsenal had returned to Division One in 1919, he was 33. He played in five League matches in 1919–20 before dropping down to the reserves.

Lewis left Arsenal in 1921, having played 220 times for the club, scoring 34 goals. He played for Margate before retiring. He died aged 80, in 1967.
