= Roddy McEachrane =

Scottish footballer

Personal information
- Full name: Roderick John McEachrane
- Date of birth: 3 February 1877
- Place of birth: Inverness, Scotland
- Date of death: 16 November 1952 (aged 75)
- Height: 5 ft 6 in (1.68 m)
- Position: Half back

Senior career*
Years	Team	Apps	(Gls)
1898–1902	Thames Ironworks	103	(6)
1902–1913	Woolwich Arsenal	313	(0)
- * Club domestic league appearances and goals

Roderick John McEachrane (3 February 1877 – 16 November 1952) was a Scottish footballer, born in Inverness.

McEachrane moved to Canning Town, London at the age of 20, to work at the Thames Iron Works, and joined the works football team, Thames Ironworks F.C. He soon settled in the side as a left half-back with a reputation for tough tackling. He was an ever-present for The Irons in the 1898–99 season, helping them to win the Southern League Division Two title. He was again an ever-present the following season, and again during Thames Ironworks' first season under their new name, West Ham United. McEachrane was also one of the Irons' first players to turn professional and during his time as a player for the club (in both its incarnations) he amassed 113 appearances and 6 goals.

In May 1902, McEachrane moved south of the River Thames to join Second Division side Woolwich Arsenal, and was later joined by ex-West Ham teammates James Bigden and Charlie Satterthwaite. He made his debut against Preston North End on 6 September 1902, and his arrival coincided with the south London club's first period of success, as they finished third in the 1902–03 season, and then second in 1903–04, which won them promotion to the First Division. McEachrane, at left half, was near ever-present, and although the Gunners usually only occupied mid-table in their first stint in the top flight, they reached the FA Cup semi-finals in 1905–06 and 1906–07.

McEachrane continued to be a stalwart in midfield for the next four seasons, as Woolwich Arsenal finished sixth in 1908–09 (McEachrane missing only two games that season), but he could not go on forever; by 1911 he was 33 and was displaced by fellow Scot Angus McKinnon. He remained at the club for another three seasons as McKinnon's understudy, although by now the club had fallen on hard times, and were relegated in 1912–13. He played his last first-team match for Woolwich Arsenal on 22 November 1913.

The arrival of World War I suspended all first-class football in England, and with it McEachrane's career finished. In all he played 346 games for Arsenal in eleven years, every single one at left half – he never scored a goal, however. He holds the Arsenal club record for the most appearances by a player without winning a cap or a medal. He died in 1952 aged 74.
