= Tom Whittaker (footballer) =

English footballer and manager

Personal information
- Full name: Thomas James Whittaker
- Date of birth: 21 July 1898
- Place of birth: Aldershot, Hampshire, England
- Date of death: 24 October 1956 (aged 58)
- Place of death: London, England
- Height: 5 ft 9 1/2 in (1.77 m)
- Position: Wing half

Senior career*
Years	Team	Apps	(Gls)
1919–1925	Arsenal	64	(2)

Managerial career
- 1947–1956: Arsenal
- * Club domestic league appearances and goals

Thomas James Whittaker MBE (21 July 1898 – 24 October 1956) was an English football player, trainer and manager, chiefly associated with Arsenal Football Club.

== Playing career ==
Whittaker was born at East Cavalry Barracks, Aldershot, Hampshire, but grew up in Newcastle upon Tyne from the age of three weeks. He spent his early football career in the North East of England as a youth player, whilst training as a marine engineer, later working in that role for Hawthorn Leslie & Co of Tyneside. He was called up to the British Army, signing up for the Royal Garrison Artillery, in 1917, moving to Lydd in Kent, before later switching to the Royal Navy. He was demobilised in 1919.

In the meantime, he had continued playing football for his regiment, and after serving his country in World War I, Whittaker forwent his engineering career and joined Leslie Knighton's Arsenal in November 1919. He first played as centre-forward then as wing-half. He signed as a professional in January 1920 and made his debut in a 1–0 defeat away to West Bromwich Albion on 6 April 1920 and became a regular in the side in the 1920s, playing 70 times for the club and scoring two goals.

He toured Australia as part of the Football Association side in 1925, but during the tour, in a match in Wollongong he broke his knee cap and was forced to retire from playing. Resolving to carry on in football, he joined Arsenal's coaching staff and entered study as a physiotherapist. He became Arsenal's first team trainer under Herbert Chapman in 1927 (whilst still younger than many of the players on the pitch). Whittaker had an important role under Chapman in reforming the training and physiotherapy regime at the club, and played an essential part in the club's successes of the 1930s.

== Managerial career ==
After Chapman's death in 1934, Whittaker continued to serve under his successor, George Allison, and also became a trainer for the England national team.

The Second World War saw Whittaker work as an ARP warden, before becoming a pilot in the Royal Air Force, achieving the rank of squadron leader. For his service on missions on D-Day, he was awarded an MBE.

With the end of the war, Whittaker resumed his role as trainer at Arsenal. After Allison's retirement in 1947, Whittaker became the club's new manager; under him the club won the League in 1947–48 and 1952–53 and the FA Cup in 1949–50. Whittaker sought to attract Blackpool's Stanley Matthews, who was approached after the Tangerines' visit to Highbury in 1954. Since Matthews was already receiving football's maximum wage at Bloomfield Road, he felt there was nothing to be gained by moving south. Matthews, however, stated that he was "very happy" and politely turned down the offer. "Such an approach was against the rules at the time and, consequently, I couldn't tell anyone about it, and I never have until now."

Whittaker, while still at the helm of Arsenal, died of a heart attack at the University College Hospital, London in 1956, at the age of 58.

== Personal life ==
Whittaker wrote an autobiography entitled The Arsenal Story which was posthumously released in 1957.

== Honours ==
=== Managerial ===
Arsenal

- Division One: 1947–48, 1952–53
- FA Cup: 1949–50
- FA Charity Shield: 1948, 1953

=== Individual ===
- Member of the Order of the British Empire: 1947

== See also ==
- List of English football championship winning managers
