= 1893–94 Woolwich Arsenal F.C. season =

English football club season

Woolwich Arsenal
1893–94 season
- Stadium: Manor Ground
- Second Division: 9th
- FA Cup: First Round
- Top goalscorer: League: James Henderson (12); All: James Henderson (18)

During the 1893–94 English football season, Woolwich Arsenal F.C. (named Arsenal F.C. since 1919) competed in the Football League Second Division. They won 12 games, drew 4, and lost 12, leaving them 9th in the league.

Arsenal were the first southern club to "embrace professionalism," and enter the Second Division of the Football League. After spending the last several seasons playing in Cup competitions and in friendlies, this was their first season in a professional league.

Arsenal's first League match was against Newcastle United at Pumstead on 2 September 1893.

== Players and statistics ==
Goalkeepers marked in italics.

	League		FA Cup		Friendlies		Total	
Player	App	Goals	App	Goals	App	Goals	App	Goals
Charles Booth	16	2	5	3	14	4	35	9
James Boyle	10	1	-	-	16	1	26	2
Stanley S. Briggs	2	-	-	-	2	-	4	0
Thomas Bryan	9	1	-	-	7	2	16	3
Robert Buist	17	1	4	-	16	1	37	2
Robert Buchanan	-	-	-	-	-	-	-	-
Lycurgus Burrows	6	-	-	-	4	-	10	0
Cook	-	-	-	-	1	-	1	0
Joseph Cooper	6	-	2	2	7	1	15	3
Gavin Crawford	21	3	5	1	19	8	45	12
Frederick W Davis	26	1	5	1	26	-	57	2
Daniel Devine	2	-	1	-	3	-	6	0
Arthur Elliott	24	10	5	5	20	16	49	31
Duncan Gemmell	5	-	-	-	6	1	11	1
Joseph Frederick "Billy" Heath	8	4	1	2	11	11	20	17
James Henderson	23	12	4	7	21	13	48	32
David Howat	27	1	4	-	24	-	55	1
GH Jacques	2	2	-	-	-	-	2	2
William Wallace Jeffery (outfield)	13	-	2	-	16	-	31	0
William Wallace Jeffery (in goal)	9 (2)	18*	2 (1)	1*	4(1)	4*	15 (4)	?
Frank V. Kirk	1	-	-	-	-	-	1	0
C McGahey	-	-	-	-	1	-	1	0
William McNab	2	1	-	-	4	3	6	4
P Mortimer	-	-	-	-	8	6	8	6
WC Muir	-	-	-	-	1	-	1	0
Patrick O'Brien	-	-	-	-	5	3	5	3
Joseph Powell	26	-	4	1	24	2	54	3
Walter J. Shaw	17	11	4	1	15	16	36	28
John A. Storrs	12	-	4	-	15	-	31	0
Watson	-	-	-	-	1	-	1	0
Charlie Williams	19(6)	37*	3(1)	4*	26(9)	40*	45 (16)	?
Walter Williams	1	-	-	-	1	2	2	2
Arthur George Worrall	4	1	-	-	11	3	15	4

== Results ==
Win	Draw	Loss

== Competitions ==
=== Football League Second Division ===
==== Final League table ====
Pos	Team	Pld	W	D	L	GF	GA	GAv	Pts	Qualification or relegation
7	Burslem Port Vale	28	13	4	11	66	64	1.031	30	
8	Lincoln City	28	11	6	11	59	58	1.017	28	
9	Woolwich Arsenal	28	12	4	12	52	55	0.945	28	
10	Walsall Town Swifts	28	10	3	15	51	61	0.836	23	
11	Middlesbrough Ironopolis (Note: Middlesbrough Ironopolis was liquidated at the end of the season.)	28	8	4	16	37	72	0.514	20	Dissolved

Rules for classification: 1) Points; 2) Goal average; 3) Goals scored

==== Matches ====
2 September 1893 1	Woolwich Arsenal	2–2	Newcastle United	Plumstead
	Shaw 8'; Elliott	Report	Sorley; Crate	Stadium: Manor Ground; Attendance: 6,000

9 September 1893 2	Notts County	3–2	Woolwich Arsenal	Nottingham
	Bruce; Watson	Report	Shaw 8'; Elliott	Stadium: Castle Ground; Attendance: 6,000

11 September 1893 3	Woolwich Arsenal	4–0	Walsall Town Swifts	Plumstead
	Heath; Crawford	Report		Stadium: Manor Ground; Attendance: 4,000

25 September 1893 4	Woolwich Arsenal	3–1	Grimsby Town	Plumstead
	Elliott; Heath; Booth	Report	Frith	Stadium: Manor Ground; Attendance: 2,000

30 September 1893 5	Newcastle United	6–0	Woolwich Arsenal	Newcastle upon Tyne
	Wallace; Thompson	Report		Stadium: St James' Park; Attendance: 2,000

21 October 1893 6	Small Heath	4–1	Woolwich Arsenal	Small Heath
	Wheldon; Hands; Hallam	Report	Henderson	Stadium: Coventry Road; Attendance: 3,000

28 October 1893 7	Woolwich Arsenal	0–5	Liverpool	Plumstead
		Report	McLean; McQueen; Stott; McCartney; Bradshaw	Stadium: Manor Ground; Attendance: 9,000

11 November 1893 8	Woolwich Arsenal	1–0	Ardwick	Plumstead
	Henderson	Report		Stadium: Manor Ground; Attendance: 4,500

13 November 1893 9	Woolwich Arsenal	3–0	Rotherham Town	Plumstead
	Henderson; Elliott; Shaw	Report		Stadium: Manor Ground; Attendance: 3,000

18 November 1893 10	Burton Swifts	6–2	Woolwich Arsenal	Burton upon Trent
	Stokes; Rowan; Dewey; Munro	Report	Elliott; Shaw	Stadium: Peel Croft; Attendance: 2,000

9 December 1893 11	Northwich Victoria	2–2	Woolwich Arsenal	Northwich
	Meredith	Report	Shaw; Boyle	Stadium: Drill Field; Attendance: 2,000

25 December 1893 12	Woolwich Arsenal	4–1	Burslem Port Vale	Plumstead
	Henderson; Shaw; Booth; Crawford	Report	Wood	Stadium: Manor Ground; Attendance: 10,000

26 December 1893 13	Grimsby Town	3–1	Woolwich Arsenal	Cleethorpes
	Jones; McCairns	Report	Buist (pen.)	Stadium: Blundell Park; Attendance: 3,000

30 December 1893 14	Ardwick	0–1	Woolwich Arsenal	Manchester
		Report	Henderson	Stadium: Hyde Road; Attendance: 4,000

1 January 1894 15	Liverpool	2–0	Woolwich Arsenal	Liverpool
	McVean; McBride	Report		Stadium: Anfield; Attendance: 5,000

6 January 1894 16	Burslem Port Vale	2–1	Woolwich Arsenal	Stoke-on-Trent
	Wood; Dean	Report	Elliott	Stadium: Athletic Ground; Attendance: 900; Referee: R. Kirkham

3 February 1894 17	Lincoln City	3–0	Woolwich Arsenal	Lincoln
	Raby; Flewitt	Report		Stadium: John O'Gaunts; Attendance: 2,000; Referee: J. Tomlinson

6 February 1894 18	Rotherham Town	1–1	Woolwich Arsenal	Rotherham
	Barr	Report	Worrall	Stadium: Clifton Grove; Attendance: 2,000

10 February 1894 19	Woolwich Arsenal	3–2	Crewe Alexandra	Plumstead
	Henderson	Report	Roberts; Sandham	Stadium: Manor Ground; Attendance: 4,000

12 February 1894 20	Walsall Town Swifts	1–2	Woolwich Arsenal	Walsall
	Holmes	Report	Henderson; Elliott	Stadium: West Bromwich Road; Attendance: 2,000

17 February 1894 21	Woolwich Arsenal	4–0	Lincoln City	Plumstead
	Elliott; Bryan; Stothert (o.g.)	Report		Stadium: Manor Ground; Attendance: 3,000

24 February 1894 22	Middlesbrough Ironopolis	3–6	Woolwich Arsenal	Middlesbrough
		Report	Shaw; Henderson; Davis	Stadium: Paradise Ground; Attendance: 500

3 March 1894 23	Crewe Alexandra	0–0	Woolwich Arsenal	Crewe
		Report		Stadium: Nantwich Road; Attendance: 2,000

10 March 1894 24	Woolwich Arsenal	1–0	Middlesbrough Ironopolis	Plumstead
	Shaw	Report		Stadium: Manor Ground; Attendance: 5,000

23 March 1894 25	Woolwich Arsenal	6–0	Northwich Victoria	Plumstead
	Howat; Elliott; Jaques; Henderson	Report		Stadium: Manor Ground; Attendance: 5,000

24 March 1894 26	Woolwich Arsenal	1–2	Notts County	Plumstead
	Crawford	Report	Bruce; Logan	Stadium: Manor Ground; Attendance: 13,000

31 March 1894 27	Woolwich Arsenal	1–4	Small Heath	Plumstead
	McNab	Report	Jenkyns; Wheldon; Mobley; Hallam	Stadium: Manor Ground; Attendance: 6,000

14 April 1894 28	Woolwich Arsenal	0–2	Burton Swifts	Plumstead
		Report	Ekins; Perry	Stadium: Manor Ground; Attendance: 2,000

=== FA Cup ===
Woolwich Arsenal were drawn at home to Ashford United in the first qualifying round. In the second qualifying round, Woolwich Arsenal were drawn at home to Clapton. They were drawn home to Millwall Rovers in the third qualifying round. In the fourth qualifying round, they were drawn away to 2nd Scots Guards. In the first round proper, they were drawn at home to The Wednesday.

14 October 1893 First qualifying round	Woolwich Arsenal	12–0	Ashford United	Plumstead
	Elliott; Booth; Heath; Crawford; Powell; Henderson	Report		Stadium: Manor Ground; Attendance: 3,000

4 November 1893 Second qualifying round	Woolwich Arsenal	6–2	Clapton	Plumstead
	Henderson; Shaw; Elliott; Cooper	Report	Raison; Hughes	Stadium: Manor Ground; Attendance: 2,500

25 November 1893 Third qualifying round	Woolwich Arsenal	2–0	Millwall Athletic	Plumstead
	Booth; Davis	Report		Stadium: Manor Ground; Attendance: 20,000

16 December 1893 Fourth qualifying round	2nd Scots Guards	1–2	Woolwich Arsenal
	Gosling	Report	Henderson	Attendance: 9,000

27 January 1894 First round	Woolwich Arsenal	1–2	The Wednesday	Plumstead
	Elliott	Report	Spiksley	Stadium: Manor Ground; Attendance: 15,000
