= List of Arsenal F.C. players (25–99 appearances) =

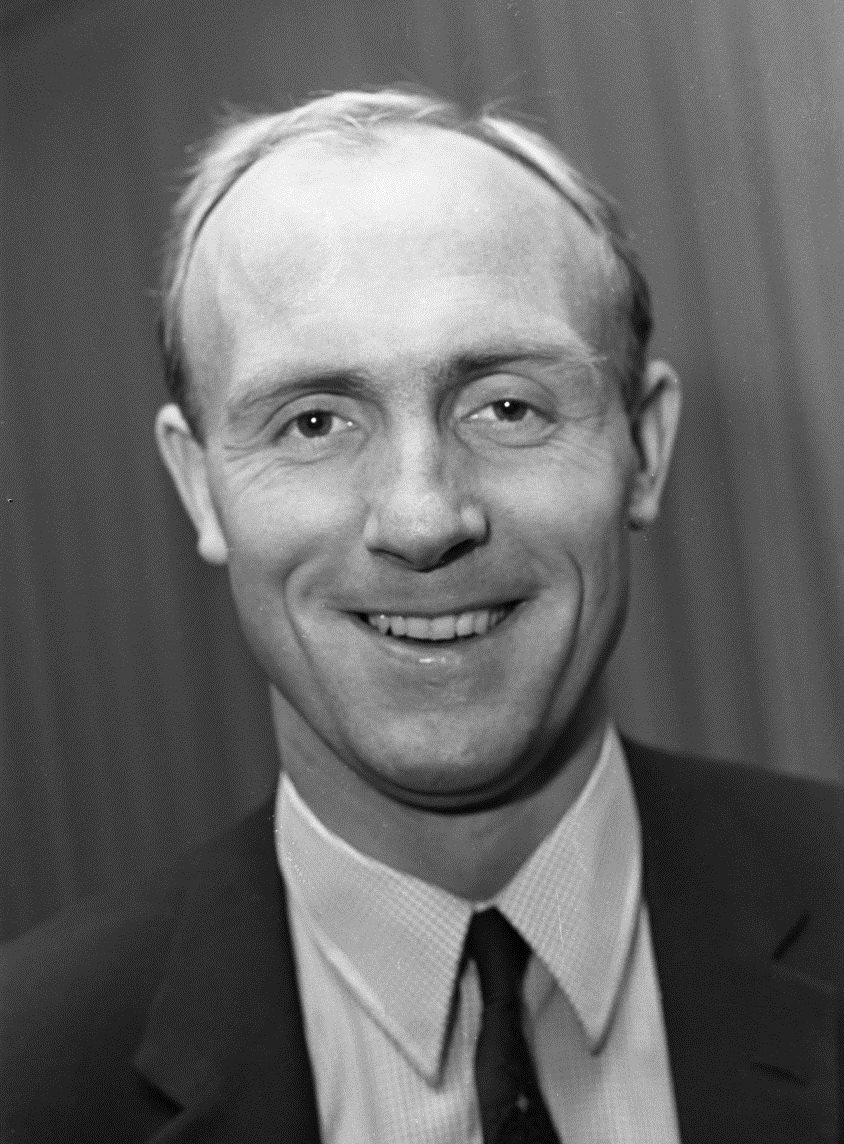
Don Howe, who played 74 games for Arsenal, managed the club from 1983 to 1986.

Arsenal Football Club, an association football club based in Islington, London, was founded in 1886 as Dial Square. They became the first southern member (Note: A club located in the southern counties of England. Initially these were amateur clubs, as professionalism in football was not as readily accepted in the south as in the north. In the 1893–94 season, Arsenal (under its former name Woolwich Arsenal) turned professional and became the first southern club admitted to the northern-oriented Football League. The following year saw the creation of the Southern Football League, which was composed of amateur and professional teams. By the 1920–21 season, the top division of the Southern Football League was absorbed by the Football League, to create its third division.) admitted into the Football League in 1893, having spent their first four seasons solely participating in cup tournaments and friendlies. The club's name, which shortly changed to Woolwich Arsenal, was shortened to Arsenal in 1914, a year after moving to Highbury. Despite finishing fifth in the Second Division in 1914–15, Arsenal rejoined the First Division at the expense of local rivals Tottenham Hotspur when football resumed after the First World War. Since that time, they have not fallen below the first tier of the English football league system and hold the record for the longest uninterrupted period in the top flight. The club's first team have competed in numerous nationally and internationally organised competitions, and all players who have played between 25 and 99 such matches, either as a member of the starting eleven or as a substitute, are listed below.

Each player's details include the duration of his Arsenal career, his typical playing position while with the club, and the number of games played and goals scored in all senior competitive matches. Two of these players, Tom Whittaker and Don Howe, went on to manage Arsenal; the former died in 1956, while in the job. The first player capped at full international level while with Arsenal was Caesar Jenkyns, when he appeared for Wales against Scotland on 21 March 1896. Bernard Joy moved into journalism following his football career, and authored the club's first detailed history book, Forward, Arsenal! Ronnie Rooke made 94 appearances for Arsenal and scored 70 goals; at a goalscoring rate of 0.745, he is the club's second-most prolific goalscorer.

Two players, Ray Daniel and Roger Ord, fell one short of 100 appearances for Arsenal. The list includes thirteen players who are still contracted to the club, and so can add to their totals.

== Key ==
- The list is ordered first by date of debut, and then if necessary in alphabetical order.
- Appearances as a substitute are included. This feature of the game was introduced in the Football League at the start of the 1965–66 season.

Positions key
Pre-1960s		1960s–	
GK	Goalkeeper		
FB	Full back	DF	Defender
HB	Half back	MF	Midfielder
FW	Forward		

Nationality
Unless otherwise noted, the nationality of a player is determined by the country/countries which he has played for, or if said person has not played international football, their country of birth.
Position
Playing positions are listed according to the tactical formations that were employed at the time. Thus the change in the names of defensive and midfield positions reflects the tactical evolution that occurred from the 1960s onwards.
Club career
Club career is defined as the first and last calendar years in which the player appeared for the club in any of the competitions listed below.
Total appearances and Total goals
Total appearances and goals comprise those in the Football League, Premier League, FA Cup, Football League Cup, FA Charity/Community Shield, European Cup/UEFA Champions League, UEFA Cup, Inter-Cities Fairs Cup, UEFA Cup Winners' Cup, Football League Centenary Trophy and European Super Cup. Matches in the United League, Southern District Combination, London League and wartime competitions are excluded.

== Players ==
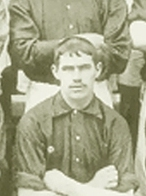
Abraham Foxall started 31 games for Arsenal, scoring three goals.

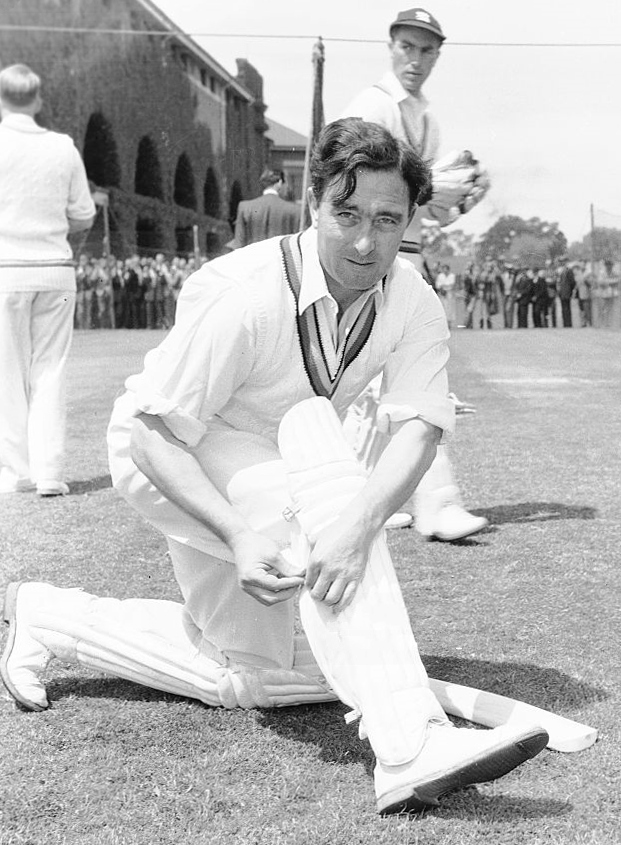
As well as playing football for Arsenal, Denis Compton forged a successful career in test cricket.

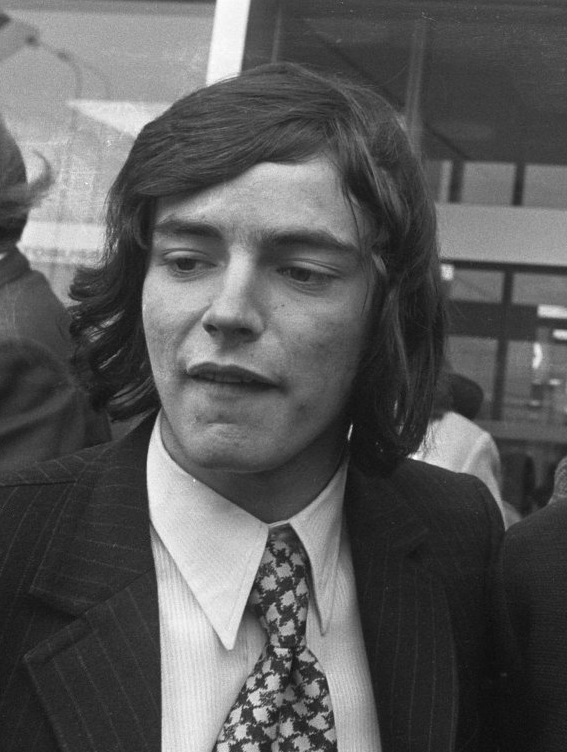
Peter Marinello scored on his Arsenal debut against Manchester United in January 1970.

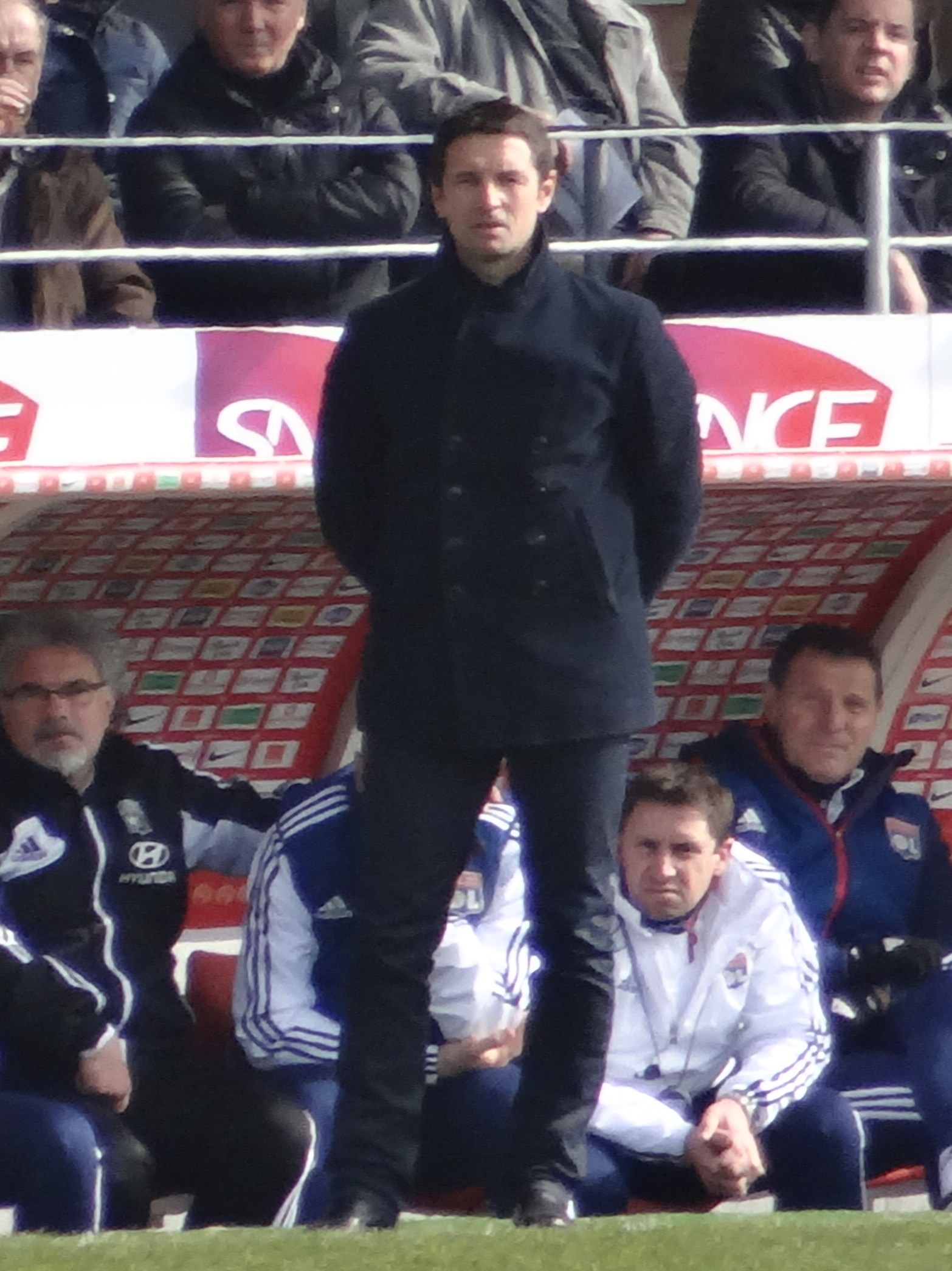
Rémi Garde, who played 45 times for Arsenal, was the club's first foreign captain.

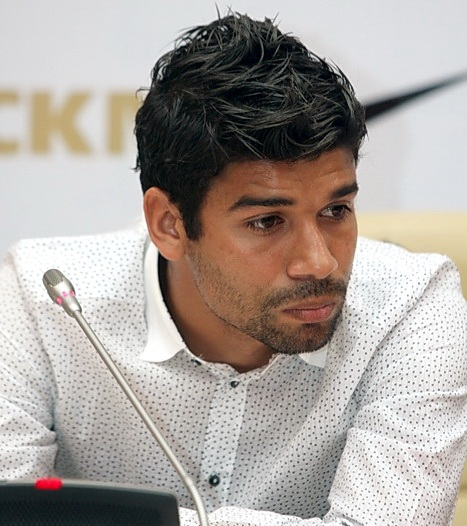
Eduardo made 67 appearances for Arsenal between 2007 and 2010, scoring 22 times.

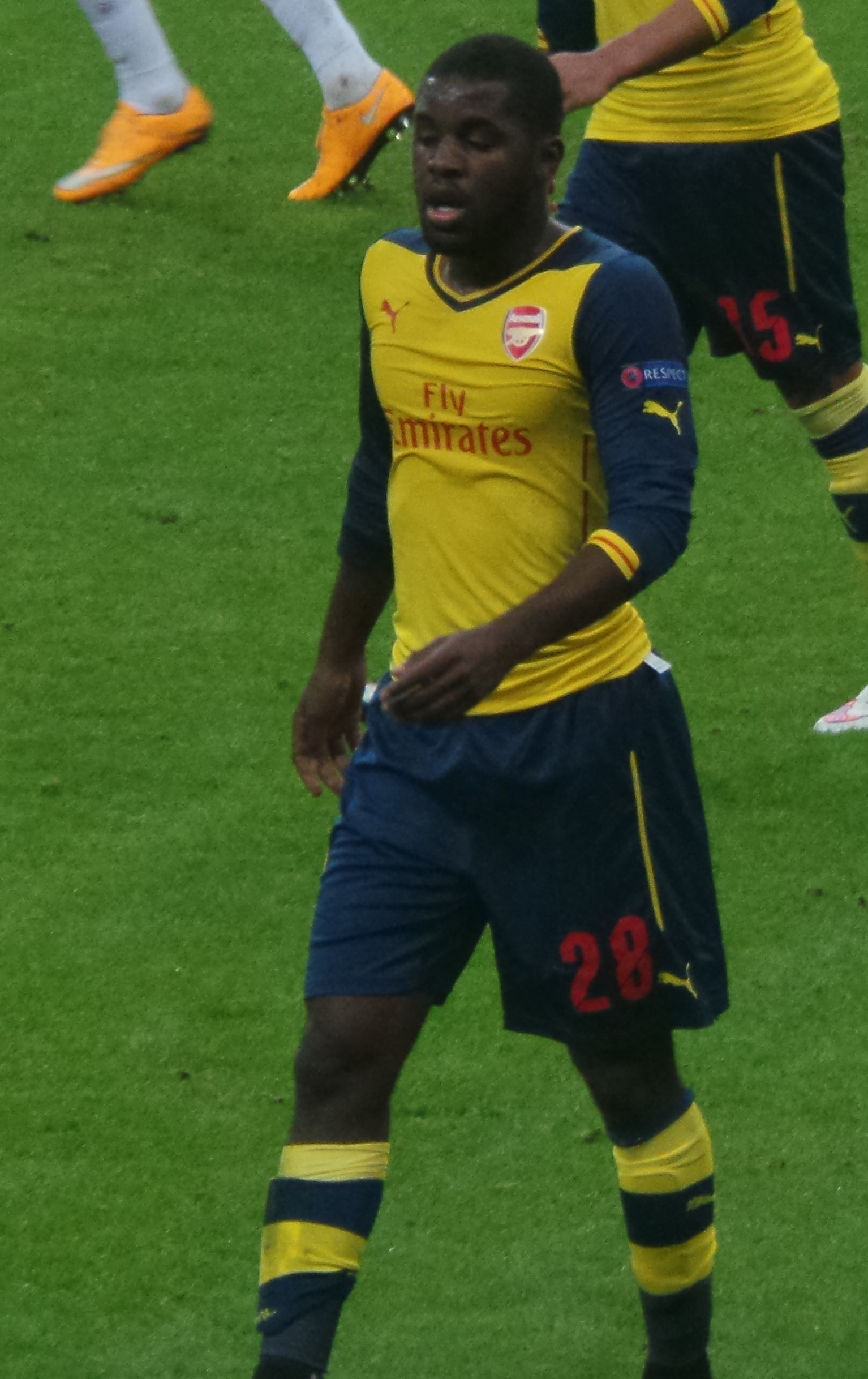
Joel Campbell made his debut for Arsenal as a substitute in the 2014 FA Community Shield.

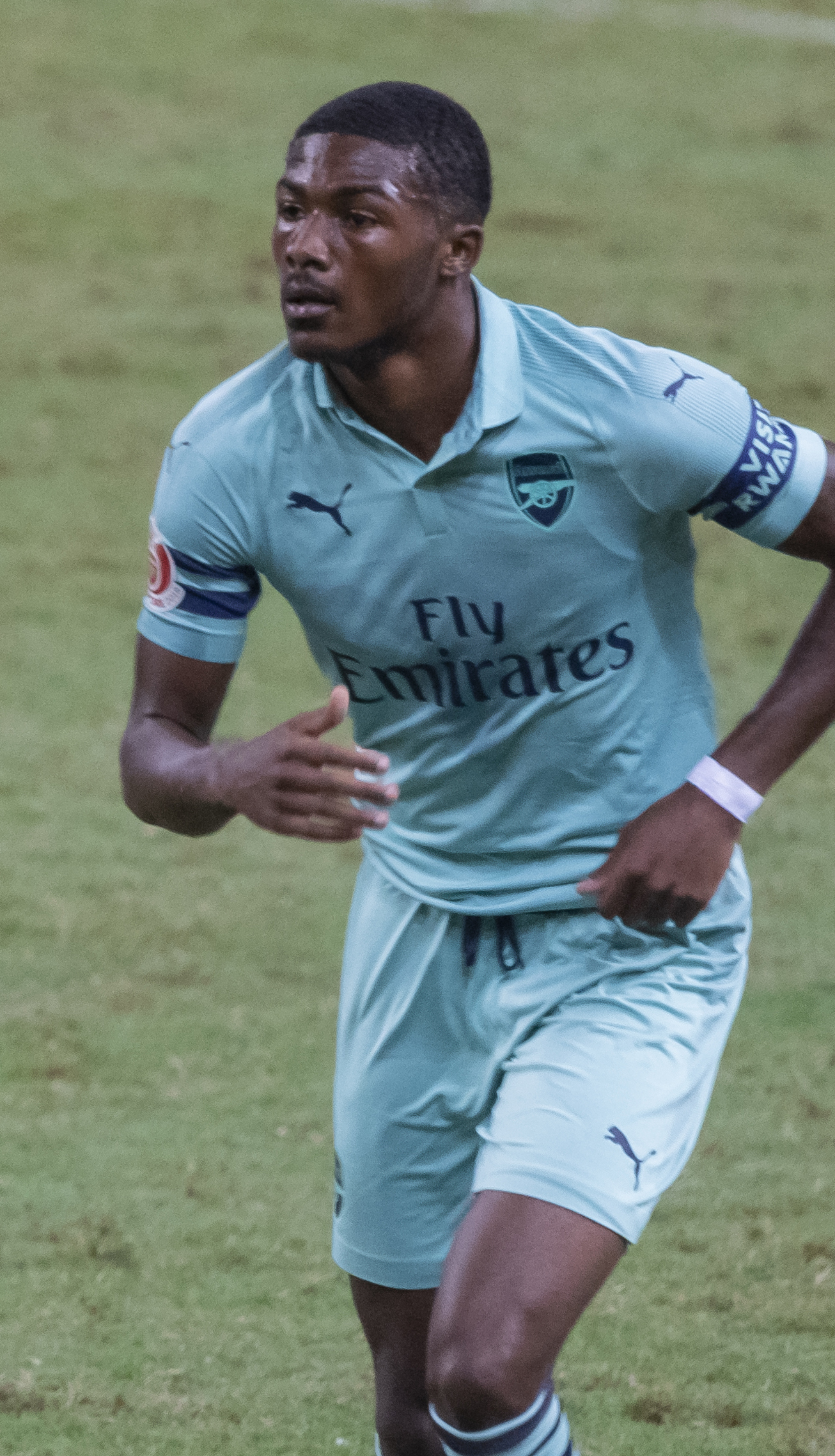
Ainsley Maitland-Niles made his professional debut for Arsenal in December 2014.

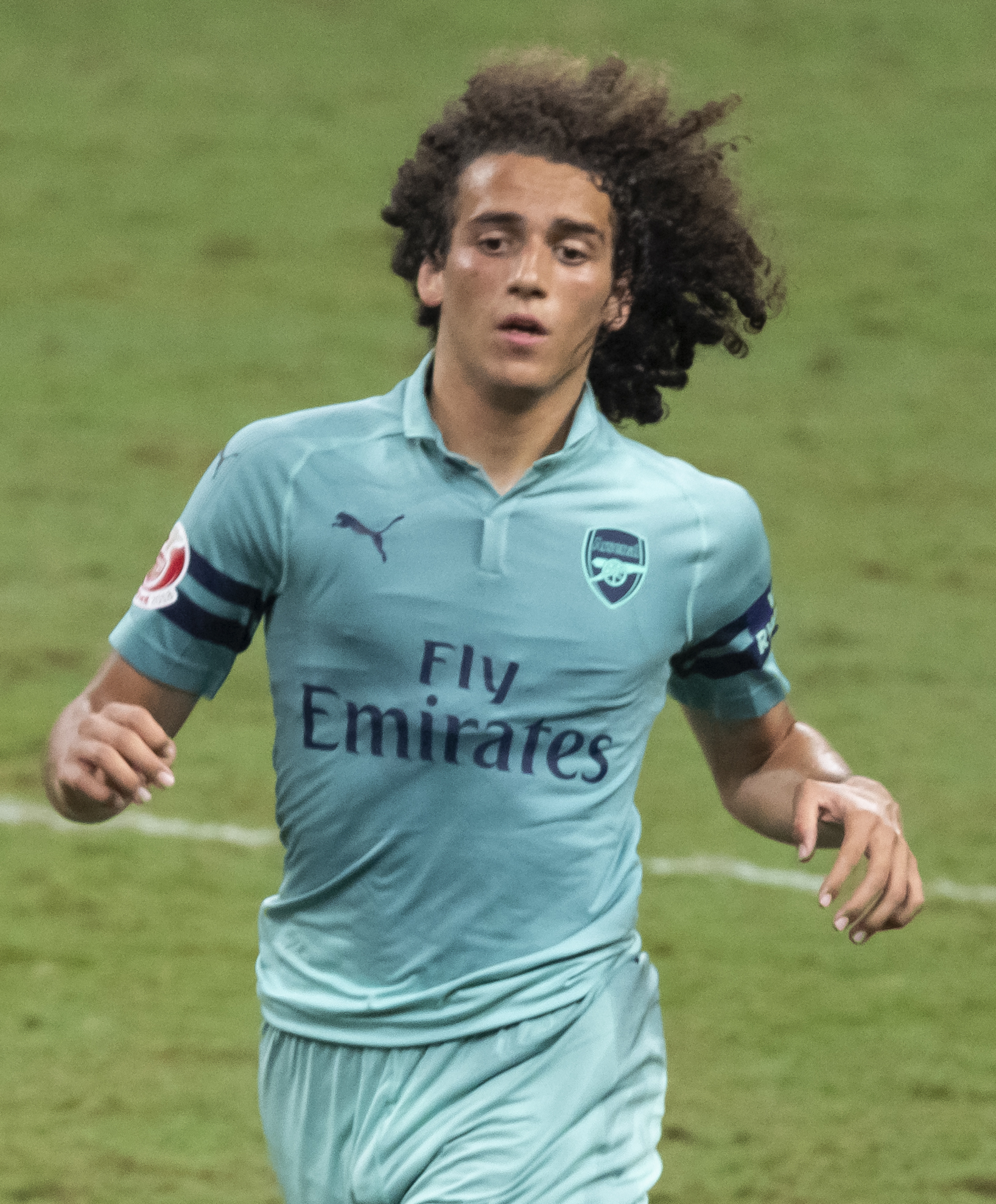
Matteo Guendouzi joined Arsenal in the summer of 2018.

Players highlighted in bold are still actively playing at Arsenal.

Statistics correct as of match played 21 November 2026

List of Arsenal F.C. players with between 25 and 99 appearances
Player	Nationality	Pos	Club career	Starts	Subs	Total	Goals
Player	Nationality	Pos	Club career	Appearances			Goals
David Howat	England	HB	1889–1896	72	0	72	3
Charles Booth	England	FW	1892–1894	26	0	26	10
Bob Buist	Scotland	FB	1892–1894	27	0	27	1
William Jeffery	Scotland	FB	1892–1894	31	0	31	0
James Henderson	Scotland	FW	1892–1895	47	0	47	31
Arthur Elliott	England	FW	1892–1894	34	0	34	19
Joe Powell	England	FB	1893–1896	92	0	92	2
James Boyle	Scotland	FB	1893–1897	66	0	66	9
Harry Storer	England	GK	1894–1898	41	0	41	0
Jock Caldwell	Scotland	FB	1894–1898	97	0	97	2
Peter Mortimer	Scotland	FW	1894–1896	48	0	48	23
Henry Boyd	Scotland	FW	1894–1896	41	0	41	32
Patrick O'Brien	Scotland	FW	1894–1897	67	0	67	29
Robert Buchanan	Scotland	FW	1894–1896	44	0	44	16
Caesar Jenkyns	Wales	FB	1895–1896	27	0	27	6
Samuel Mills	England	FW	1895–1896	25	0	25	3
Frank McAvoy	Scotland	FW	1895–1898	48	0	48	10
William Fairclough	Scotland	GK	1896–1897	27	0	27	0
Adam Haywood	England	FW	1896–1899	91	0	91	36
Finlay Sinclair	Scotland	FB	1896–1897	28	0	28	0
James Brock	Scotland	FW	1896–1898	63	0	63	23
John Russell	Scotland	FW	1896–1897	25	0	25	4
Roger Ord	England	GK	1897–1900	99	0	99	0
James McAuley	Scotland	FB	1897–1898	27	0	27	2
Fergus Hunt	England	FW	1897–1903	77	0	77	33
Craig McGeoch	Scotland	FW	1897–1899	39	0	39	14
William White	Scotland	FW	1897–1899	42	0	42	16
David Hannah	Ireland	HB	1897–1899	50	0	50	17
Alex McConnell	Scotland	FB	1897–1899	38	0	38	1
James Moir	Scotland	HB	1898–1900	45	0	45	0
John McAvoy	Scotland	FB	1898–1899	26	0	26	0
Herbert Shaw	England	FW	1898–1900	30	0	30	9
Joe Murphy	England	FW	1899–1900	32	0	32	0
Andrew McCowie	Scotland	FW	1899–1900	33	0	33	7
Paddy Logan	Scotland	FW	1899–1901	29	0	29	7
James Tennant	Scotland	FW	1899–1901	54	0	54	10
Ralph Gaudie	England	FW	1899–1901	50	0	50	23
Sandy Main	Scotland	FW	1899–1902	69	0	69	14
Walter Place	England	FW	1900–1901	45	0	45	7
Tommy Low	Scotland	FW	1900–1901	26	0	26	2
Peter Turner	Scotland	FW	1900–1901	36	0	36	5
Freddie Coles	England	HB	1900–1904	86	0	86	2
Abraham Foxall	England	FW	1901–1902	31	0	31	3
Thomas Fitchie	Scotland	FW	1902–1909	63	0	63	30
Walter Anderson	England	FW	1902–1903	30	0	30	11
Billy Linward	England	FW	1902–1905	50	0	50	10
Tommy Shanks	Ireland	FW	1903–1904	48	0	48	29
James Bigden	England	HB	1904–1908	87	0	87	1
Bob Templeton	Scotland	FW	1904–1906	41	0	41	1
Jim Bellamy	England	FW	1905–1907	29	0	29	4
Bertie Freeman	England	FW	1905–1908	49	0	49	24
William Garbutt	England	FW	1905–1908	65	0	65	14
Edwin Bateup	England	GK	1906–1911	36	0	36	0
Peter Kyle	Scotland	FW	1906–1908	60	0	60	23
Jackie Mordue	England	FW	1907–1908	28	0	28	1
Harold Lee	England	FW	1907–1909	41	0	41	15
Gordon Hoare	England	FW	1908–1911	34	0	34	13
Sam Raybould	England	FW	1908–1909	30	0	30	7
Matthew Thomson	Scotland	HB	1909–1913	94	0	94	1
Walter Lawrence	England	FW	1909–1910	26	0	26	0
Duncan McDonald	Scotland	FB	1909–1910	27	0	27	0
Alf Common	England	FW	1910–1912	80	0	80	23
Jackie Chalmers	Scotland	FW	1910–1912	51	0	51	22
Tom Winship	England	FW	1910–1915	56	0	56	7
George Burdett	England	GK	1911–1912	28	0	28	0
Jack Peart	England	FB	1911–1921	66	0	66	0
George Grant	England	HB	1911–1915	57	0	57	4
Charles Randall	Scotland	FW	1911–1913	44	0	44	12
Sidney Crawford	Scotland	GK	1911–1913	27	0	27	0
Frederick Groves	England	FW	1912–1921	53	0	53	7
Joe Fidler	England	FB	1913	25	0	25	0
Stephen Stonley	England	FW	1913–1914	39	0	39	14
Joe Lievesley	England	GK	1913–1915	75	0	75	0
Wally Hardinge	England	FW	1913–1920	55	0	55	14
George Jobey	England	HB	1913–1914	28	0	28	3
Bob Benson	England	FB	1914–1915	54	0	54	7
Chris Buckley	England	FB	1914–1920	59	0	59	3
Harry King	England	FW	1914–1915	39	0	39	29
Clem Voysey	England	HB	1919–1926	37	0	37	6
Stephen Dunn	England	GK	1919–1922	44	0	44	0
Fred Pagnam	England	FW	1919–1921	53	0	53	27
Tom Whittaker	England	HB	1920–1925	70	0	70	2
Jimmy Paterson	Scotland	FW	1920–1926	77	0	77	2
Reg Boreham	England	HB	1921–1923	53	0	53	18
Bob Turnbull	Scotland	FW	1921–1924	66	0	66	28
Andrew Young	England	FB	1922–1927	71	0	71	9
Harry Woods	England	FW	1923–1926	75	0	75	22
Sam Haden	England	FW	1923–1927	93	0	93	11
James Ramsay	Scotland	FW	1924–1926	75	0	75	10
Andrew Neil	Scotland	FW	1924–1926	57	0	57	10
Bill Harper	Scotland	GK	1925–1931	73	0	73	0
Bill Seddon	England	HB	1926–1931	76	0	76	0
Horace Cope	England	FB	1926–1933	76	0	76	0
Harry Peel	England	FW	1926–1929	52	0	52	6
Leonard Thompson	England	FW	1928–1932	27	0	27	6
Ray Parkin	England	FW	1929–1935	26	0	26	11
Charlie Preedy (Note: Preedy was born in Neemuch, India, but is considered a British citizen by descent under nationality law.)	England	GK	1929–1932	40	0	40	0
Joey Williams	England	FW	1929–1931	26	0	26	5
Alf Haynes	England	HB	1929–1933	31	0	31	0
Ernie Coleman	England	FW	1932–1934	46	0	46	26
Pat Beasley	England	HB	1932–1936	89	0	89	24
Frank Hill	Scotland	HB	1932–1936	81	0	81	4
Norman Sidey	England	DF	1932–1938	45	0	45	0
Jimmy Dunne	Republic of Ireland	FW	1933–1936	33	0	33	13
Alex Wilson	Scotland	GK	1934–1938	90	0	90	0
Bobby Davidson	Scotland	FW	1935–1937	63	0	63	15
Jackie Milne	Scotland	FW	1935–1937	54	0	54	19
Bernard Joy	England	DF	1936–1946	95	0	95	0
Denis Compton	England	FW	1936–1950	60	0	60	16
Frank Boulton	England	GK	1936–1938	42	0	42	0
David Nelson	Scotland	HB	1936–1946	29	0	29	4
Leslie Jones	Wales	FW	1937–1946	51	0	51	3
George Drury	England	FW	1938–1946	40	0	40	3
Bryn Jones	Wales	FW	1938–1949	76	0	76	8
Joe Wade	England	FB	1946–1954	93	0	93	0
Paddy Sloan	Republic of Ireland	HB	1946–1947	36	0	36	1
Ted Platt	England	GK	1946–1952	57	0	57	0
Ronnie Rooke	England	FW	1946–1949	94	0	94	70
Ray Daniel	Wales	FB	1949–1953	99	0	99	5
Arthur Shaw	England	HB	1949–1954	61	0	61	0
Freddie Cox	England	FW	1949–1953	94	0	94	16
Ben Marden	England	HB	1951–1955	42	0	42	11
Arthur Milton	England	FW	1951–1955	84	0	84	21
Gerry Ward	England	HB	1953–1962	84	0	84	10
Tommy Lawton	England	FW	1953–1955	38	0	38	15
William Dickson	Northern Ireland	HB	1953–1955	31	0	31	1
Con Sullivan	England	GK	1954–1957	32	0	32	0
Jim Fotheringham	Scotland	FB	1954–1958	76	0	76	0
Mike Tiddy	England	FW	1955–1958	52	0	52	8
Gordon Nutt	England	FW	1955–1960	51	0	51	10
Jim Standen	England	GK	1957–1960	38	0	38	0
John Petts	England	DF	1958–1962	32	0	32	1
Tommy Docherty	Scotland	FW	1958–1961	90	0	90	1
Mel Charles	Wales	FW	1959–1962	64	0	64	28
John Snedden	Scotland	DF	1960–1964	94	0	94	0
Jack McClelland	Northern Ireland	GK	1961–1964	49	0	49	0
Dave Bacuzzi	England	DF	1961–1964	48	0	48	0
Ian McKechnie	Scotland	GK	1961–1963	25	0	25	0
Fred Clarke	Northern Ireland	DF	1962–1965	28	0	28	0
Terry Anderson	England	MF	1963–1965	26	0	26	7
Don Howe	England	DF	1964–1966	74	0	74	1
Tony Burns	England	GK	1964–1965	33	0	33	0
Colin Addison	England	FW	1966–1967	31	1	32	10
David Jenkins	England	DF	1966–1968	24	1	25	9
George Johnston	Scotland	FW	1967–1969	20	5	25	3
Bobby Gould	England	FW	1968–1970	72	11	83	23
Jimmy Robertson	Scotland	FW	1968–1970	58	1	59	8
John Roberts	Wales	DF	1969–1972	77	4	81	5
Geoff Barnett	England	GK	1969–1975	49	0	49	0
Peter Marinello	Scotland	FW	1970–1973	43	8	51	5
Jeff Blockley	England	DF	1972–1974	62	0	62	1
Brian Hornsby	England	DF	1973–1975	23	3	26	6
Richie Powling	England	DF	1973–1977	54	5	59	3
John Matthews	England	MF	1974–1978	48	9	57	5
Brian Kidd	England	FW	1974–1976	90	0	90	34
Terry Mancini	Republic of Ireland	DF	1974–1976	62	0	62	1
Alex Cropley	Scotland	MF	1974–1976	33	1	34	6
Trevor Ross	England	MF	1975–1977	66	1	67	9
Alan Hudson	England	MF	1977–1978	46	1	47	0
Steve Walford	England	DF	1977–1981	78	20	98	4
Steve Gatting	England	DF	1978–1981	65	11	76	6
Paul Vaessen	England	FW	1978–1982	27	14	41	9
Brian McDermott	England	FW	1979–1984	44	28	72	13
George Wood	Scotland	GK	1980–1983	70	0	70	0
Peter Nicholas	Wales	MF	1981–1983	77	3	80	3
Raphael Meade	England	FW	1981–1985	32	19	51	16
Lee Chapman	England	FW	1982–1983	17	11	28	6
Colin Hill	Northern Ireland	DF	1983–1984	51	0	51	1
Tommy Caton	England	DF	1983–1986	95	0	95	3
Paul Mariner	England	FW	1984–1986	60	10	70	17
Niall Quinn	Republic of Ireland	FW	1985–1990	81	13	94	20
Gus Caesar	England	DF	1985–1990	31	20	51	0
Brian Marwood	England	FW	1988–1990	60	1	61	17
Colin Pates	England	DF	1990–1992	16	9	25	1
Jimmy Carter	England	MF	1991–1994	21	11	32	2
Steve Morrow	Northern Ireland	DF	1992–1997	52	33	85	3
Ian Selley	Scotland	MF	1992–1997	51	9	60	2
Paul Dickov	Scotland	FW	1993–1996	9	17	26	7
Scott Marshall	Scotland	DF	1993–1997	21	6	27	1
Eddie McGoldrick	Republic of Ireland	MF	1993–1995	44	13	57	1
Stefan Schwarz	Sweden	MF	1994–1995	49	0	49	4
Stephen Hughes	England	MF	1994–2000	36	41	77	7
John Hartson	Wales	FW	1995–1997	55	16	71	17
Glenn Helder	Netherlands	FW	1995–1996	33	16	49	1
Rémi Garde	France	MF	1996–1999	27	16	43	0
Nicolas Anelka	France	FW	1997–1999	74	17	91	28
Luís Boa Morte	Portugal	MF	1997–1999	13	26	39	4
Christopher Wreh	Liberia	FW	1997–2000	18	28	46	5
Alex Manninger	Austria	GK	1997–2001	63	1	64	0
Matthew Upson	England	DF	1997–2003	39	17	56	0
Nelson Vivas	Argentina	DF	1998–2001	29	40	69	1
Davor Šuker	Croatia	FW	1999–2000	15	24	39	11
Sylvinho	Brazil	DF	1999–2001	66	14	80	5
Jermaine Pennant	England	FW	1999–2005	12	14	26	3
Stuart Taylor	England	GK	2000–2003	26	4	30	0
Igors Stepanovs	Latvia	DF	2000–2003	29	2	31	1
Giovanni van Bronckhorst	Netherlands	MF	2001–2003	39	25	64	2
Francis Jeffers	England	FW	2001–2003	13	26	39	8
Jérémie Aliadière	France	FW	2001–2007	19	32	51	9
Pascal Cygan	France	DF	2002–2006	80	18	98	3
Justin Hoyte	Trinidad and Tobago	DF	2003–2008	50	18	68	0
Júlio Baptista	Brazil	FW	2006–2007	17	18	35	10
Armand Traoré	Senegal	DF	2006–2011	28	4	32	0
Eduardo	Croatia	FW	2007–2010	41	26	67	22
Łukasz Fabiański	Poland	GK	2007–2014	75	3	78	0
Carlos Vela	Mexico	FW	2008–2011	19	43	62	11
Mikaël Silvestre	France	DF	2008–2010	37	6	43	3
Marouane Chamakh	Morocco	FW	2010–2012	36	31	67	14
Sébastien Squillaci	France	DF	2010–2012	35	4	39	2
Gervinho	Ivory Coast	FW	2011–2013	44	19	63	11
Carl Jenkinson	England	DF	2011–2019	55	15	70	1
Yossi Benayoun	Israel	MF	2011–2012	15	10	25	5
André Santos	Brazil	DF	2011–2013	21	12	33	3
Emiliano Martinez	Argentina	GK	2012–2020	36	2	38	0
Lukas Podolski	Germany	FW	2012–2014	55	27	82	31
Mathieu Debuchy	France	DF	2014–2018	29	1	30	2
Joel Campbell	Costa Rica	FW	2014–2016	23	17	40	4
David Ospina	Colombia	GK	2014–2019	67	3	70	0
Gabriel	Brazil	DF	2015–2017	53	11	64	1
Reiss Nelson	England	FW	2017–2024	35	55	90	8
Joe Willock	England	MF	2017–2021	40	38	78	11
Henrikh Mkhitaryan	Armenia	MF	2018–2020	43	16	59	9
Sokratis Papastathopoulos	Greece	DF	2018–2021	65	4	69	6
Matteo Guendouzi	France	MF	2018–2022	57	25	82	1
Lucas Torreira	Uruguay	MF	2018–2022	55	34	89	4
Dani Ceballos	Spain	MF	2019–2021	48	29	77	2
David Luiz	Brazil	DF	2019–2021	69	4	73	4
Cédric Soares	Portugal	DF	2020–2024	45	19	64	2
Willian	Brazil	FW	2020–2021	21	16	37	1
Aaron Ramsdale	England	GK	2021–2024	89	0	89	0
Nuno Tavares	Portugal	DF	2021–2025	17	11	28	1
Albert Sambi Lokonga	Belgium	MF	2021–2025	26	13	39	0
Takehiro Tomiyasu	Japan	DF	2021–2025	50	34	84	2
Oleksandr Zinchenko	Ukraine	DF	2022–2025	60	31	91	3
Fábio Vieira	Portugal	MF	2022–2024	17	32	49	3
**Ethan Nwaneri**	England	MF	2022–	20	31	51	10
Jorginho	Italy	MF	2023–2025	46	33	79	2
Jakub Kiwior	Poland	DF	2023–2025	45	23	68	3
**Mikel Merino**	Spain	MF	2024–	54	40	94	16
**Riccardo Calafiori**	Italy	DF	2024–	56	22	78	6
**Myles Lewis-Skelly**	England	MF	2024–	55	33	88	1
Raheem Sterling	England	FW	2024–2025	13	15	28	1
**Martin Zubimendi**	Spain	MF	2025–	51	18	69	6
**Viktor Gyökeres**	Sweden	FW	2025–	46	24	70	23
**Eberechi Eze**	England	FW	2025–	43	24	67	13
**Noni Madueke**	England	FW	2025–	37	20	57	12
**Piero Hincapié**	Ecuador	DF	2025–	33	15	48	1
**Cristhian Mosquera**	Spain	DF	2025–	24	16	40	0
