= List of Margate F.C. managers =

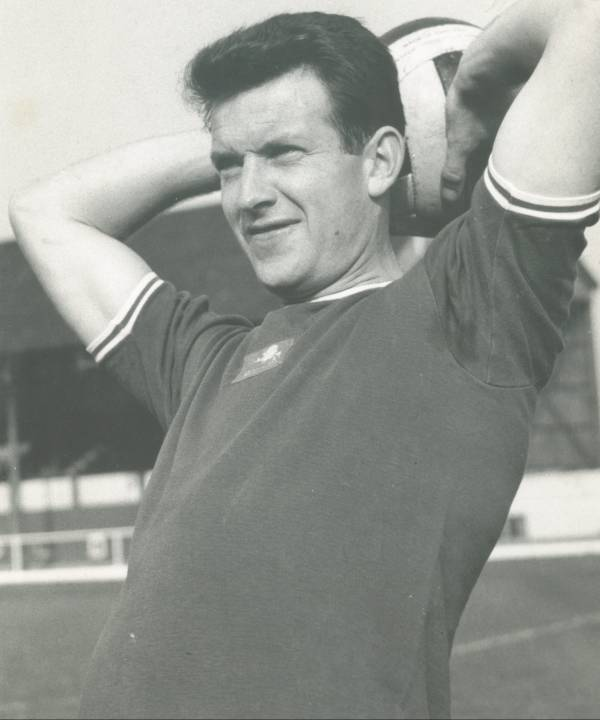
Les Riggs managed Margate for six years in the 1970s.

This is a list of Margate F.C. managers since the club appointed its first full-time manager in 1929, along with the number of competitive games managed and winning percentage where available.

== Managerial history ==
Although Margate F.C. was founded in 1896, a full-time manager was not appointed until 1929, when Arthur Graves was appointed upon the club's reformation after a year's hiatus. Three other managers came and went before the Second World War, after which Charlie Walker took over. He held the post for two years before being controversially sacked over claims his outside business interests were interfering with his management of the team.

The next manager to last more than one year in the position was Almer Hall, who was appointed in 1950 and held the post for twenty years and led the team to a large number of cup victories, though he was unable to achieve success in league competition. He was replaced in 1970 by former American international Gerry Baker, but his reign lasted only a year. Les Riggs was the next manager and remained in the job for six years but resigned over budget restrictions. Over the following decade, a number of managers came and went in quick succession as the club's financial problems increased.

In the late 1980s and early 1990s former professional players such as Tommy Taylor and Mark Weatherly managed the club with little success, but in 1996, former Dover Athletic manager, Chris Kinnear, took charge and oversaw the club's rise to the Conference National, the highest level of non-league football. The club experienced various off-field problems during this period and had fallen back to the Isthmian League Premier Division by the time Kinnear was dismissed in 2006, with former Gillingham player Robin Trott taking over. He held the job until his dismissal in April 2008.

== Managers ==
All senior competitive first-team matches are included. Statistics correct to 17 September 2008.

| Name | Nat | From | To | Record | | | | | Notes |
| Name | Nat | From | To | P | W | D | L | %W | Notes |
|---|---|---|---|---|---|---|---|---|---|
| Arthur Graves | | 1929 | tbc | | | | | | |
| James Ramsay | Scotland | 1934 | 1936 | | | | | | |
| Jack Lambert | | 1936 | tbc | | | | | | |
| Bill Fogg | | 1939 | 1940 | | | | | | |
| Charlie Walker | England | Summer 1946 | June 1948 | 85 | 53 | 13 | 19 | 62.35 | |
| Alex Weir | Scotland | July 1948 | October 1948 | 11 | 5 | 1 | 5 | 45.45 | |
| Club committee | – | November 1948 | June 1949 | 30 | 12 | 4 | 14 | 40.00 | |
| Jock Basford | | June 1949 | May 1950 | 40 | 19 | 7 | 14 | 47.50 | |
| Almer Hall | England | June 1950 | May 1970 | 1137 | 566 | 220 | 351 | 49.78 | |
| Gerry Baker | United States | Summer 1970 | September 1971 | 85 | 31 | 17 | 37 | 36.47 | |
| Committee/Eddie Clayton/Terry Morris | – | October 1971 | November 1971 | 9 | 5 | 0 | 4 | 55.56 | |
| Les Riggs | England | November 1971 | March 1977 | 347 | 146 | 84 | 117 | 42.07 | |
| Peter Donnelly | England | March 1977 | May 1977 | 16 | 2 | 5 | 9 | 12.50 | |
| Dennis Hunt | England | May 1977 | November 1978 | 68 | 34 | 17 | 17 | 50.00 | |
| Jack Smith | | November 1978 | June 1979 | 38 | 10 | 9 | 19 | 26.32 | |
| Terry Morris | England | June 1979 | November 1982 | 185 | 47 | 30 | 108 | 25.41 | |
| Peter Donnelly | England | November 1982 | May 1983 | 24 | 10 | 3 | 11 | 41.67 | |
| Alan Fagan | | May 1983 | November 1983 | 22 | 5 | 4 | 13 | 22.73 | |
| John Wickens | | November 1983 | March 1987 | 192 | 70 | 45 | 77 | 36.46 | |
| Norman Fusco | England | March 1987 | October 1988 | 83 | 31 | 32 | 20 | 37.35 | |
| Phil Winfield | England | October 1988 | October 1988 | 1 | 0 | 1 | 0 | 0.00 | |
| Garry Aldous | England | November 1988 | May 1989 | 35 | 6 | 8 | 21 | 17.14 | |
| Trevor Ford | | June 1989 | March 1990 | 46 | 14 | 18 | 14 | 30.43 | |
| Colin Powell | England | March 1990 | October 1990 | 27 | 12 | 5 | 10 | 44.44 | |
| Steve McRaye | | October 1990 | January 1991 | 18 | 6 | 3 | 9 | 33.33 | |
| Tommy Taylor | England | January 1991 | October 1991 | 33 | 10 | 11 | 12 | 30.30 | |
| Mark Weatherly | England | October 1991 | November 1991 | 7 | 3 | 3 | 1 | 42.86 | |
| Lee Smelt | England | November 1991 | June 1992 | 32 | 10 | 11 | 11 | 31.25 | |
| Lee Smelt and Mark Weatherly | England | June 1992 | September 1992 | 9 | 6 | 3 | 0 | 66.67 | |
| Mark Weatherly | England | September 1992 | February 1993 | 29 | 9 | 4 | 16 | 31.03 | |
| Mark Weatherly and Andy Woolford | England | February 1993 | May 1994 | 69 | 35 | 13 | 21 | 50.72 | |
| Bill Roffey | England | July 1994 | April 1995 | 48 | 19 | 8 | 21 | 39.58 | |
| Mark Weatherly and Karl Elsey | England/Wales | April 1995 | May 1995 | 7 | 2 | 2 | 3 | 28.57 | |
| Karl Elsey | Wales | May 1995 | March 1996 | 41 | 16 | 6 | 19 | 39.02 | |
| Mark Weatherly | England | March 1996 | May 1996 | 10 | 5 | 1 | 4 | 50.00 | |
| Chris Kinnear | England | 1996 | April 2006 | | | | | | |
| Robin Trott | England | April 2006 | April 2008 | 107 | | | | | |
| Steve McKimm | England | April 2008 | May 2008 | 2 | 1 | 0 | 1 | 50.00 | |
| Barry Ashby | England | May 2008 | October 2008 | 15 | 3 | 3 | 9 | 20.00 | |
| Terry Yorath | Wales | October 2008 | September 2009 | | | | | | |
