= Charles Frith =

Charles Frith may refer to:

- Charlie Frith (footballer) (1868–1942), English footballer
- Charlie Frith (cricketer) (1854–1919), New Zealand cricketer
- Charles H. Frith (1838–1912), American politician
