= James Ramsay (footballer) =

Scottish professional footballer (1898–1969)

Personal information
- Full name: James Howie Ramsay
- Date of birth: 7 August 1898
- Place of birth: Clydebank, West Dunbartonshire, Scotland
- Date of death: 26 January 1969
- Position: Inside forward

Senior career*
Years	Team	Apps	(Gls)
- Moore Park
- Arthurlie
- Renfrew Victoria
- Kilmarnock
1923–1926	Arsenal	69	(11)
- Kilmarnock
- Galston

Managerial career
- 1934–1936: Margate
- * Club domestic league appearances and goals

James Howie Ramsay (7 August 1898 – 26 January 1969) was a Scottish professional footballer and manager who notably played for Arsenal under Leslie Knighton and Herbert Chapman in the 1920s.

== Career ==
Arsenal bought Ramsay from Scottish side Kilmarnock in February 1924 for £1775. After making 78 appearances and scoring 11 goals for the club, he returned to Kilmarnock in December 1926. Ramsay later managed Margate in the 1930s.

== Playing statistics ==
Club	Season	League			FA Cup		Total	
Club	Season	Division	Apps	Goals	Apps	Goals	Apps	Goals
Arsenal	1923–24	First Division	11	3	0	0	11	3
Arsenal	1924–25	First Division	30	6	3	0	33	6
Arsenal	1925–26	First Division	16	0	3	0	19	0
Arsenal	1926–27	First Division	12	2	0	0	12	2
Career total			69	11	6	0	75	11

== See also ==
- List of Arsenal F.C. players (25–99 appearances)
- List of Margate F.C. managers
