= 1923–24 Arsenal F.C. season =

English football club season

Arsenal
1923–24 season
- Chairman: Henry Norris
- Manager: Leslie Knighton
- Stadium: Highbury
- First Division: 19th
- FA Cup: Second round
- Top goalscorer: League: Harry Woods (9); All: Harry Woods (10)
- Highest home attendance: 50,000 vs. Tottenham Hotspur (17 November 1923)
- Lowest home attendance: 15,000 vs. Sheffield United (25 February 1924)
Home colours	Away colours

The 1923–24 season was Arsenal's fifth consecutive season in the top division of English football.

== Results ==
Arsenal's score comes first

=== Legend ===
Win	Draw	Loss

=== Football League First Division ===
Date	Opponent	Venue	Result	Attendance	Scorers
25 August 1923	Newcastle United	H	1–4		
27 August 1923	West Ham United	A	0–1		
1 September 1923	Newcastle United	A	0–1		
8 September 1923	West Bromwich Albion	A	0–4		
10 September 1923	West Ham United	H	4–1		
15 September 1923	West Bromwich Albion	H	1–0		
22 September 1923	Birmingham	A	2–0		
29 September 1923	Birmingham	H	0–0		
6 October 1923	Manchester City	A	0–1		
13 October 1923	Manchester City	H	1–2		
20 October 1923	Bolton Wanderers	A	2–1		
27 October 1923	Bolton Wanderers	H	0–0		
3 November 1923	Middlesbrough	H	2–1		
10 November 1923	Middlesbrough	A	0–0		
17 November 1923	Tottenham Hotspur	H	5–1		
24 November 1923	Tottenham Hotspur	A	5–3		
1 December 1923	Blackburn Rovers	H	2–2		
8 December 1923	Blackburn Rovers	A	0–2		
15 December 1923	Huddersfield Town	H	1–3		
22 December 1923	Huddersfield Town	A	1–6		
26 December 1923	Notts County	A	2–1		
27 December 1923	Notts County	H	0–0		
29 December 1923	Chelsea	H	1–0		
5 January 1924	Chelsea	A	0–0		
19 January 1924	Cardiff City	H	1–2		
26 January 1924	Cardiff City	A	0–4		
9 February 1924	Sheffield United	A	1–3		
16 February 1924	Aston Villa	H	0–1		
25 February 1924	Sheffield United	H	1–3		
1 March 1924	Liverpool	H	3–1		
12 March 1924	Aston Villa	A	1–2		
15 March 1924	Nottingham Forest	A	1–2		
22 March 1924	Nottingham Forest	H	1–0		
2 April 1924	Liverpool	A	0–0		
5 April 1924	Burnley	H	2–0		
12 April 1924	Sunderland	H	2–0		
18 April 1924	Everton	A	1–3		
19 April 1924	Sunderland	A	1–1		
21 April 1924	Everton	H	0–1		
26 April 1924	Preston North End	A	2–0		
28 April 1924	Burnley	A	1–4		
3 May 1924	Preston North End	H	1–2		

=== FA Cup ===
Arsenal entered the FA Cup in the first round proper, in which they were drawn to face West Ham United.

Round	Date	Opponent	Venue	Result	Attendance	Goalscorers
R1	12 January 1924	Luton Town	H	4–1	37,500	Milne, Blyth, Turnbull, Woods
R2	14 January 1925	Cardiff City	A	0–1	35,000	

== See also ==
- 1923–24 in English football
- List of Arsenal F.C. seasons
