= Charles Booth (footballer) =

English footballer

Personal information
- Date of birth: 23 October 1868
- Place of birth: Gainsborough, Lincolnshire, England
- Date of death: September 17, 1898 (aged 29)
- Place of death: Wolverhampton, England
- Position: Outside left

Senior career*
Years	Team	Apps	(Gls)
- Gainsborough Trinity
1889–1892	Wolverhampton Wanderers	61	(9)
1892–1894	Woolwich Arsenal	26	(10)
1894–?	Loughborough		
- * Club domestic league appearances and goals

Charles Booth (15 August 1869 – September 1898) was an English footballer who played for Wolverhampton Wanderers and Woolwich Arsenal.

== Career ==
Booth was born in Gainsborough, Lincolnshire, and started at his hometown club Gainsborough Trinity before joining Wolverhampton Wanderers in 1889. He made his Football League debut on 7 September 1889 in a 2–0 win over Notts County.

He spent three seasons with the Midlands side before moving south to join Woolwich Arsenal in 1892. He was a regular in the side straight away, scoring five goals in the 1892–93 season (making him joint-top scorer with James Henderson).

Booth remained in the Arsenal side when they joined the Football League Second Division in 1893, playing at outside left in Arsenal's very first League match, against Newcastle United on 2 September 1893. He continued to play in the side until a 3–0 defeat to Lincoln City on 3 February 1894. Booth lost his place to Thomas Bryan and later moved to Loughborough.

He died in September 1898, aged 28.
