= Frank Norris (footballer) =

English footballer

Personal information
- Full name: Frank Norris
- Date of birth: 1869
- Place of birth: Preston, England
- Date of death: 1934 (aged 65)
- Place of death: Preston, England
- Position: Full back

Senior career*
Years	Team	Apps	(Gls)
- Preston Hornets
- Fishwick Ramblers
189?–1892	Preston North End	3	(0)
1892–1899?	Darlington		
- * Club domestic league appearances and goals

Frank Norris (1869–1934) was an English footballer who played in the Football League as a full back for Preston North End in 1891–92. He also played non-league football for Preston Hornets, Fishwick Ramblers and Darlington.

== Personal life ==
Norris's birth was registered in Preston, Lancashire in the third quarter of 1869. He was one of numerous children of Francis Norris (also known as Frank) and his wife Margaret. At the time of Norris's baptism at All Saints Church in September 1869, the family were living in the Ashton area of the city and Norris senior was working as an engine tenter.

Norris died in his native Preston in 1934 at the age of 65. His death was registered in the last quarter of that year.

== Football career ==
Norris began his senior football career playing as a centre forward for Preston Hornets, and also captained the team, before moving on to Fishwick Ramblers, which is where he became a full back. By the 1890–91 season, that team had become Preston North End's reserve eleven, and Norris acted as its captain. He made frequent appearances for Preston in friendly matches, and made his Football League debut on 26 September 1891, replacing the injured Nick Ross at left back – despite being primarily a right back – for the visit to Bolton Wanderers. Although Preston lost 3–0, the Preston Chronicle reported that "praise [was] also due to the backs (Holmes and Norris), the last named – from the Fishwick Ramblers – doing very well remembering it was his first trial in a first-class game." He kept his place for the next match, a 2–0 win away to Wolverhampton Wanderers, and again "did well for a youngster". His third and final league appearance came in April 1892 in the reverse fixture against Wolverhampton Wanderers. This time, he played alongside Ross, deputising for Bob Holmes who was away on England international duty; Preston won 3–0.

At the end of the season, Norris became one of numerous additions to the personnel of Darlington, then a professional club playing in the Northern League. He played regularly at full back, and contributed to their winning both the Durham Challenge Cup and its Cleveland equivalent that season. As a young man living in Preston, Norris had worked as a joiner, and when the Darlington club reverted to amateurism, he took employment in that trade at the North Road Railway Engine Works.

Together with four of his Darlington teammates, Norris was selected to represent the Cleveland Association against Cumberland in September 1895. Cleveland won 8–0, and the North-Eastern Daily Gazette thought he and Middlesbrough's Dan Wilson "proved an admirable pair of backs". Norris succeeded Davy Campbell as captain of Darlington for the 1895–96 season. He led the team to the league title and to the semifinal of that season's Amateur Cup, in which they were unexpectedly defeated by Bishop Auckland, having beaten them 7–2 a few weeks earlier.

Norris played in all Darlington's FA Cup matches from the 1892–93 through to 1896–97, and led them to a third Durham Cup victory. At a celebratory dinner at the end of the 1896–97 season, he recognised that his career might be coming to an end. Replying to the toast to Darlington Football Club and "their esteemed captain", he said that as long as he stayed in the area he would take an active interest in the club, keeping its welfare at heart, and if suitable new players arrived, he would "readily stand aside, and be prepared to fill any vacancies that might from time to time occur". Norris was selected for the inaugural Northern League representative fixture, between players contracted to clubs affiliated to the Durham Association and those from Cleveland clubs, in April 1897. He continued in Darlington's side thereafter, albeit less regularly, until at least the 1898–99 season.

== Style of play ==
With Darlington, Norris was consistently one of the better performers. According to a glowing profile in the Northern Echo, quoting "a Newcastle contemporary", "His kick is very sure and very strong. In addition he is a very ready tackler, showing unusual pluck and determination. His play evinces nothing, however, pertaining to recklessness. He goes in firmly and always gets the ball." This last was not entirely accurate: in an Amateur Cup tie against Old Carthusians in 1896, "Norris was the principal offender in the matter of fouls, and narrowly escaped being ordered off the field by the referee." If he had a fault, it was a tendency to be caught too far upfield: the Gazette suggested that he "would be well advised to stick more to his own position and not get so much among the forwards". Apart from his defensive duties, he took free kicks and penalties.
