= Billy Heath =

English footballer

Personal information
- Full name: William Joseph Michael Heath
- Date of birth: 1869
- Place of birth: Bristol, England
- Position: Forward

Senior career*
| Years | Team | Apps | (Gls) |
| 1891–1892 | Wolverhampton Wanderers | 8 | (4) |
| 1893–1895 | Woolwich Arsenal (Arsenal FC) | 10 | (5) |
- Gravesend United
- * Club domestic league appearances and goals

William Joseph Michael , better known as Billy Heath (1869 – after 1895), was an English footballer who played in the Football League for Wolverhampton Wanderers and Woolwich Arsenal. He is best known for having scored the first-ever penalty kick awarded in the Football League, doing it so in a match between Wolves and Accrington at Molineux Stadium on 14 September 1891, which Wolves won 5–0.
