= Jock Sorley =

Scottish footballer

Personal information
- Full name: John Sorley
- Date of birth: 26 February 1870
- Place of birth: Muirkirk, Scotland
- Date of death: 10 July 1945 (aged 75)
- Height: 5 ft 10 in (1.78 m)
- Position: Centre forward

Senior career*
Years	Team	Apps	(Gls)
1890–1891	Newmilns		
1891–1893	Newcastle East End		
1893	Newcastle United	1	(1)
1893	Middlesbrough		
1893–1895	Blackburn Rovers	26	(9)
1895–1896	Burton Swifts	26	(1)
1897	Hebburn Argyle		
Total		53	(11)
- * Club domestic league appearances and goals

John Sorley (26 February 1870 – 10 July 1945) was a Scottish footballer who played in the Football League for Blackburn Rovers, Burton Swifts and Newcastle United.
