= Fred Davis (footballer, born 1871) =

English footballer

Personal information
- Full name: Frederick William Davis
- Date of birth: 1871
- Place of birth: Smethwick, Staffordshire, England
- Date of death: After 1900
- Position: Wing half

Senior career*
Years	Team	Apps	(Gls)
- Soho Villa
- Birmingham St George's
1893–1899	Woolwich Arsenal	137	(8)
1899–1900	Nottingham Forest	0	(0)
- * Club domestic league appearances and goals

Frederick William Davis (1871 – after 1900) was an English footballer who played in the Football League for Woolwich Arsenal. A wing half, he also played for Soho Villa, Birmingham St George's and Nottingham Forest.

Davis was born in Smethwick, Staffordshire, and played as a wing half for local clubs including Soho Villa and Birmingham St George's before in 1893 signing for Woolwich Arsenal, who had just become the first club from the south of England to join the Football League. He made his league debut for the side in their second-ever league match, a 3–2 defeat away to Notts County on 9 September 1893. He was a near ever-present for the 1893–94 season (missing only one more game) and continued to do so for the four seasons after that.

With Davis in the side Woolwich Arsenal mainly occupied mid-table of the Second Division, reaching as high as fifth in 1897–98. After the end of the 1898–99 season Davis left Arsenal to join First Division Nottingham Forest. He had played exactly 150 games for Arsenal in six seasons, scoring ten goals. However, at Forest he never played a single match and appears to have left football entirely by the year 1900.
