= Stanley Briggs =

English footballer (1872–1931)

Personal information
- Date of birth: 7 February 1872
- Place of birth: Stamford Hill
- Date of death: 1931
- Place of death: Shell Lake, Saskatchewan, Canada
- Position: Centre half

Senior career*
Years	Team	Apps	(Gls)
- Folkestone
- Hermitage F.C.
1890–1892	Tottenham	0	(0)
1893	Woolwich Arsenal	2	(0)
1896–1898	Tottenham Hotspur	8	(1)
- Clapton
1902	Shepherds Bush		
- * Club domestic league appearances and goals

Stanley Briggs (7 February 1872 – 1931) was an English footballer who played as a centre half for Folkestone, Tottenham Hotspur, Woolwich Arsenal and Clapton.

== Career ==
Briggs first joined Tottenham in 1890, which was previously known as Hermitage. In October 1893 he joined Woolwich Arsenal and was there less than three months playing only two games. His first and debut match was against Rotherham Town, the other game was against Burton Swifts which ended 6–2. In 1895 when Tottenham moved to turn professional the club held a meeting at The Eagle pub in which Briggs refused to attend. This left Briggs the only amateur in the team when the rest turned professional. He was considered one of the best players in the team at the time.

After his football career, Briggs emigrated to Canada and died while playing tennis.

== Appearances ==
- Southern League: 7 apps, 1 goal
- FA Cup: 10 apps
- Other: 95 app, 10 goals
- Total: 112 apps, 11 goals
