= Peter Turner (Scottish footballer) =

Scottish footballer

Personal information
- Full name: Peter Turner
- Date of birth: 18 December 1876
- Place of birth: Glasgow, Scotland
- Date of death: 8 February 1970 (aged 93)
- Place of death: East Kilbride, Scotland
- Position: Inside forward

Senior career*
Years	Team	Apps	(Gls)
- Parkhead
1898–1900	St Bernard's		
1900–1901	Woolwich Arsenal	33	(5)
1901–1903	Middlesbrough	23	(6)
1903–1904	Luton Town		
1904–1907	Watford	99	(20)
1907–1908	Leyton		
1909	Doncaster Rovers		(0)
- * Club domestic league appearances and goals

Peter Turner (18 December 1876 – 8 February 1970) was a Scottish footballer. He played as an inside forward.

== Career ==
Born in Glasgow, Turner started his career in Scottish junior football, playing for Parkhead, St Bernard's, and the Scottish junior football team. He moved to England in 1900, playing for Woolwich Arsenal, Middlesbrough, Luton Town, Watford, Leyton and Doncaster Rovers.
