= Abraham Foxall =

English footballer (1874–1950)

Abe Foxall
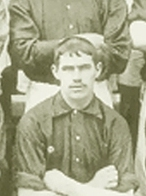

Personal information
- Full name: Abraham Foxall
- Date of birth: 8 November 1874
- Date of death: 1950 (aged 75–76)
- Position: Forward

Youth career
- Tinsley

Senior career*
Years	Team	Apps	(Gls)
1897-1899	Gainsborough Trinity	61	(15)
1899-1900	Liverpool FC	1	(0)
1900-1901	Queens Park Rangers	31	(4)
1901-1902	Woolwich Arsenal	31	(3)
1902–1903	Kettering		
1903-1904	Roundell		
1903-1906	Gainsborough Trinity	83	(8)
1906	Grantham Avenue		
- * Club domestic league appearances and goals

Abraham Foxall (8 November 1874 – 1950) was an English footballer who played as a striker.
