= William McNab (footballer) =

Scottish footballer

Personal information
- Full name: William McNab
- Date of birth: 1870
- Place of birth: Glasgow, Scotland
- Position: Centre forward

Senior career*
Years	Team	Apps	(Gls)
- Northern
1892–1894	Burnley	14	(5)
1894	Woolwich Arsenal	2	(1)
- Clapton Orient
- * Club domestic league appearances and goals

William McNab (1870 – unknown) was a Scottish professional footballer who played as a centre forward.

At representative level, he played once for the Scottish Football Alliance XI against the rival Scottish Football League in 1892, while with Northern.

He made no appearances for Clapton Orient after his brief time with Arsenal.
