= Fishwick Ramblers F.C. =

Fishwick Ramblers
- Full name: Fishwick Ramblers Football Club
- Nickname: the Ramblers
- Founded: 1875
- Dissolved: 12 February 1891
- Ground: Walton Brow
Home colours

Fishwick Ramblers F.C. was an English association football club from Preston in Lancashire.

== History ==
The club was founded as a rugby club. The club's ground was opposite the Cemetery Hotel in Preston. Although the club played at least one match in 1875 to association rules, and at least one in 1877 to Sheffield rules, it was mostly a rugby club until 1881. In January 1878, the club hosted Preston North End in the Preston Challenge Trophy, in front of 2,000 spectators, to rugby union rules, losing by 2 tries, 2 dead balls, and 4 touchdowns, to 2 tries.

=== Association football ===
In 1881, the club switched to playing solely association rules, with the first reported match against another club taking place at the end of February 1882. By the start of the next season, the club's ground was given as Walton Brow.

The club entered the Lancashire Cup for the first time in 1883–84, losing to Burnley Olympic in the first round.

Despite this check on ambitions, the club entered the FA Cup for the first time the following season. In a sign of changing times, the club faced an unsuccessful protest from Rishton after beating it in the Lancashire Cup because of professionalism, and neither Preston North End and Preston Zingari took part in the FA Cup because of arguments with the Football Association regarding professionalism. This left the Ramblers as the only Preston side in the competition; they beat Darwen Ramblers in the first round but lost to Darwen in the second. In the Lancashire Cup, the club went one round further, losing at Church in the third.

In 1885–86, the club was drawn against Halliwell of Bolton in the first round, and was initially given a walkover as the FA suspended Halliwell for using an Astley Bridge player in a friendly match without permission. However, on appeal, the FA lifted the suspension, and Halliwell won the tie 2–1, despite the FA's rules on professional eligibility requiring Halliwell to field mostly a reserve team.

The club did not enter the FA Cup again; an 11–0 defeat to Preston North End in a friendly shortly after the club's FA Cup exit may have been a factor.

In 1889, the club was a founder member of the new Lancashire Junior League competition, but, given the presence of the biggest club in the country on its doorstep, the club found that continuing even as a junior club to be too hard; after 19 games out of a scheduled 24, the Ramblers had only won three times, were bottom of the table by four points, and refused to complete its fixture list. From September 1890 it became the de facto reserve side of Preston North End, playing at Deepdale, and, in 1891, Preston asked for formal permission to absorb the club. On 12 February 1891, the Lancashire Football Association gave that permission and contracts were duly transferred, although the Ramblers played under the original name until the end of 1892.

== Colours ==
The club's colours were amber and black jerseys, with blue (serge) knickers.

== Ground ==
The club's ground was at Walton Brow, and its facilities were on the ground.

== Notable players ==
- Frank Norris
- Richard Whittle
- Frank Becton
