= Almer Hall =

English footballer and manager (1912–1994)

Personal information
- Date of birth: 12 November 1912
- Place of birth: Hove, England
- Date of death: 7 November 1994 (aged 81)
- Place of death: England
- Height: 5 ft 7 in (1.70 m)
- Position: Striker

Senior career*
Years	Team	Apps	(Gls)
- Southwick
1930–1934	Brighton & Hove Albion	0	(0)
1934–1937	Tottenham Hotspur	16	(3)
1937–1939	Southend United	37	(10)
1939	Bradford City	0	(0)
1945–1950	West Ham United	50	(11)
1950–1953	Margate	67	(36)

Managerial career
- 1950–1970: Margate
- * Club domestic league appearances and goals

Almeric George Hall (12 November 1912 – 7 November 1994) was an English footballer and manager.

Born in Hove, Hall, a striker, began his professional career in 1930 with his local club Brighton & Hove Albion. Before making any appearances for the Sussex club he moved to Tottenham Hotspur. He scored twice on his Spurs debut, in a 2–1 victory over Grimsby Town at White Hart Lane on Boxing Day 1934 in the First Division. He later played for Southend United, Bradford City, where his one appearance was later expunged from the records after the outbreak of the Second World War.

After the war he played for West Ham United where he made 50 Football League appearances, having previously appeared as a guest player for West Ham during the war, before moving to non-league Margate in 1950 as player-manager.

He played for the Kent club until 1953, when he retired from playing to concentrate on management and remained the club's manager until 1970. His twenty-year reign making him the club's longest serving manager. He led the team to a host of regional cup finals, as well as taking them into the rounds proper of the FA Cup on eleven occasions, but was not able to bring them any significant success in the league.

After leaving Margate he had a spell as a scout for Luton Town.
