= Billy Linward =

English footballer

Personal information
- Full name: William Henry Linward
- Date of birth: 1877
- Place of birth: Hull, England
- Date of death: 1940 (aged 62)
- Place of death: West Ham, England
- Position: Outside left

Senior career*
Years	Team	Apps	(Gls)
?−1895	Grimsby All Saints		
1895–1901	Doncaster Rovers		(53)
1901–1902	West Ham United	30	(3)
1902–1905	Woolwich Arsenal	47	(10)
1905–1906	Norwich City	3	(0)
1906–1907	Kilmarnock		
1907–1908	Maidstone United		
1908–	Dartford		
- * Club domestic league appearances and goals

William Henry Linward (1877–1940) was an English footballer who played as an outside left for Doncaster Rovers, West Ham United, Woolwich Arsenal, Norwich City, Kilmarnock and Maidstone United at the turn of the 20th century.

== Club career ==
Born in Hull, Linward is first known as playing for Grimsby All Saints, from where he moved to Doncaster Rovers in the Midland League for the start of the 1895–86 season.

=== Doncaster Rovers ===
He scored his first goal on his home debut in a 3–0 victory over Mansfield Town in front of a 1000 crowd. His time at Doncaster involved two Midland League championships and one runner up, plus being runner up in the Yorkshire League. In all competitive games in his 6 seasons at Doncaster he scored 65 goals including two hattricks. On 5 November 1898, he scored twice against Huddersfield in the Yorkshire League in the still standing joint record 14−0 Doncaster win.

=== West Ham United ===
Just as Doncaster were elected into the Football League for the 1901–02 season, Linward moved to Southern League club West Ham United receiving a wage of £2.10s a week. He played in all 30 League games for West Ham that season plus one FA Cup game before being bought by Second Division club, Woolwich Arsenal in the December of the 1902–03 season.

=== Woolwich Arsenal ===
His debut for the second 11 was against Millwall Athletic on Boxing Day and then his full first team debut was following day against Burnley. His first goal was the third in a 3–1 win over Preston North End on 3 January 1903. During his second season, Linward played an important part in Arsenal's promotion to the First Division for the first time in their history. This included scoring 5 times in 27 League games. After playing only 6 League games the following season in the top division, Linward moved in the summer to Norwich City.

=== Norwich City ===
He joined the Citizens (as the team were then nicknamed) when they first became a Southern League club, making his debut on 2 September 1905 in a 2–0 defeat at Plymouth Argyle, thus having the honour of appearing in their first ever match as a professional side. He played again against Watford and Brighton before the month was out but this would be the sum of his Norwich City contribution and after failing to secure a first team place, he left at the end of the season.

He spent the next season at Kilmarnock, the following one in non league football in Kent, with Maidstone United and later Dartford.

Linward died in West Ham in 1940 aged 62 years.

== Honours ==
Doncaster Rovers

- Midland League
  - Champions: 1896–97, 1898–99
  - Runners up: 1900–01
- Yorkshire League
  - Runners up: 1898–99
- Mexborough Montague Charity Cup
  - Winners: 1900–01

Arsenal

- Football League Second Division
  - Runners up: 1903–04
