= David Howat =

British football player

Personal information
- Date of birth: 1 October 1870
- Place of birth: Preston, Lancashire, England
- Position: Halfback

Senior career*
Years	Team	Apps	(Gls)
- Fishwick Ramblers
–1888	Preston North End		
1889–1896	Arsenal	72	(3)
- Third Lanark
Total		72	(3)
- * Club domestic league appearances and goals

David Howat (1 October 1870 – ?) was an English football player and engineer. He was born in Preston, Lancashire, England.

== Football career ==
Howat started his career at Fishwick Ramblers F.C., as a halfback. He then played for Preston North End, before playing for Arsenal F.C. in 1889.

At the club, he played between 1889 and 1896. He appeared in 72 games, and scored 3 goals for the team. He was a part of the London Senior Cup-winning squad of 1891, and was captain of the team in the 1894–1895 season. After leaving the team, he later played for Third Lanark.

== See also ==
- List of Arsenal F.C. players
