= Ashford United F.C. (1880) =

Ashford United
- Full name: Ashford United Football Club
- Founded: 1880
- Dissolved: 1906
- Ground: Godinton Road

Ashford United F.C. was an English football club based in Ashford, Kent. The side was formed in 1880 and won the Kent Senior Cup in 1893. A year later the club became founder members of the Kent League. The club played home games at Godinton Road. The club entered the FA Cup in 1893–1894, and were beaten by Arsenal 12–0. in the first qualifying round. United withdrew from the Kent League in 1906 and the club was closed down.
