= Robin Trott =

English footballer (born 1974)

Personal information
- Full name: Robin Francis Trott
- Date of birth: 17 August 1974 (age 52)
- Place of birth: Orpington, England
- Position: Central defender

Youth career
- Gillingham

Senior career*
Years	Team	Apps	(Gls)
1993–1995	Gillingham	10	(0)
1993–1994	→ Hastings Town (loan)		
1995–1996	Mansion (Hong Kong)		
1996–1997	Welling United		
1997–2003	Stevenage Borough	97	(8)
2003	Grays Athletic		
2003–2004	Gravesend & Northfleet	2	(0)
2004–2005	Billericay Town		
2005	Heybridge Swifts		
2005–2006	Billericay Town	?	
2006–2008	Margate	79	(2)
2008	Welling United	0	(0)
- Billericay Town

Managerial career
- 2006–2008: Margate
- * Club domestic league appearances and goals as of 08:11, 4 November 2008 (UTC)

Robin Francis Trott (born 17 August 1974) is an English football player and manager.

== Career ==
Trott began his career at Gillingham, where he made ten league appearances but found himself unable to command a regular first team place. In 1995, he left the club to try his luck in Hong Kong but returned to England the following year, where he has gone on to carve out a career in non-league football. A successful first season with Welling United saw him signed by Stevenage Borough for £8,000. He later played for Grays Athletic and Gravesend & Northfleet.

He served as player-manager of Margate from April 2006 until April 2008. He later had a short spell with Welling United, before signing for Billericay Town to begin a third spell with the Essex-based club. His third debut with The Blues came against Ramsgate on 25 October 2008.
