= Les Riggs =

English footballer and manager (1935–2020)

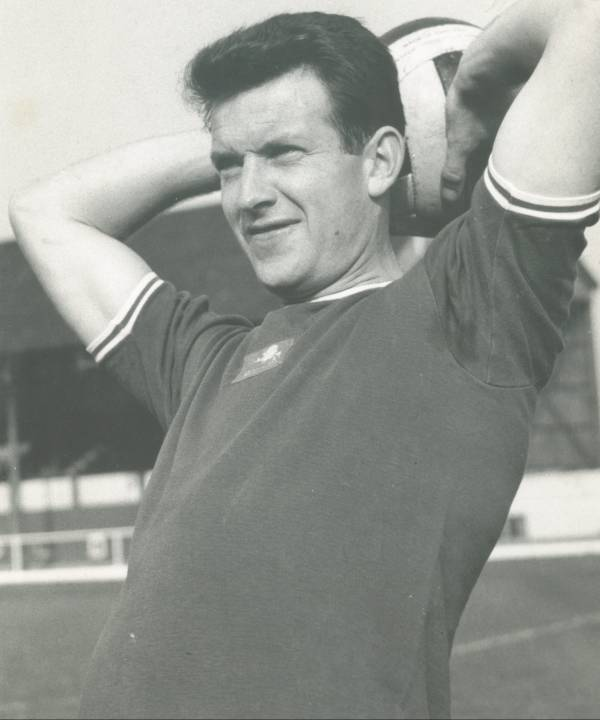
- Les Riggs pictured in a Gillingham shirt

Personal information
- Full name: Leslie John Riggs
- Date of birth: 30 May 1935
- Place of birth: Portsmouth, England
- Date of death: 29 December 2020 (aged 85)
- Position: Half-back

Youth career
- 1952–1953: Gillingham

Senior career*
Years	Team	Apps	(Gls)
1953–58	Gillingham	152	(3)
1958–61	Newport County	110	(3)
1961–63	Bury	6	(0)
1963–64	Crewe Alexandra	67	(6)
1964–65	Gillingham	18	(1)
1965–?	Ramsgate		

Managerial career
- 1965–?: Ramsgate
- 1971–77: Margate
- * Club domestic league appearances and goals as of 22 April 2007

Leslie John Riggs (30 May 1935 – 29 December 2020) was an English professional footballer. He made over 350 Football League appearances, his most successful spells being spent with Gillingham and Newport County.

== Career ==
Although born in Portsmouth, Riggs came through the junior ranks with Gillingham and made his league debut in April 1954 at the age of just 18. He went on to make 152 appearances for the Kent club and was noted for his tough tackling and long throw-ins.

In 1958 Riggs moved to Newport County for a fee of £1,750, where he again racked up over 100 Football League appearances. In 1961 he was sold to Bury for £750 but could only manage 6 league starts at Gigg Lane due to injury before a move to Crewe Alexandra in 1963. Eighteen months later he returned to Gillingham, who were strengthening their side after promotion to Division Three, and made 18 further appearances for the Gills.

In October 1965 Riggs joined non-league Ramsgate as player-manager and later spent more than five years as manager of their near-neighbours Margate.

After leaving football in 1977 Riggs ran a guest house and later opened a sporting goods shop in Cliftonville which still bears his name. He lived in Broadstairs in retirement. He died on 29 December 2020, aged 85.
