= Igors Stepanovs =

Igors Stepanovs may refer to:

- Igors Stepanovs (footballer, born 1966), Latvian footballer and coach
- Igors Stepanovs (footballer, born 1976), Latvian football defender
