= Thomas Bryan (English footballer) =

English footballer (1873–?)

Thomas Bryan (born 1873) was an English footballer who played in the Football League in the late 19th century. His clubs included Woolwich Arsenal and New Brompton and he made nine appearances in the League, scoring one goal.
