= Arthur Elliott (footballer) =

English footballer

Personal information
- Full name: Arthur Elliott
- Date of birth: 1870
- Place of birth: Nottingham, England
- Position: Forward

Senior career*
| Years | Team | Apps | (Gls) |
- Notts Rangers
| ?–1891 | Gainsborough Trinity | | |
| 1891–1892 | Accrington | 24 | (7) |
| 1893–1894 | Woolwich Arsenal | 24 | (10) |
| 1894 | Tottenham Hotspur | 0 | (0) |
| 1894–? | Nottingham Forest | | |
- * Club domestic league appearances and goals

Arthur Elliott (born 1870) was an English footballer who played in the Football League for Accrington and Woolwich Arsenal. He started his career playing for Notts Rangers and Gainsborough Trinity before joining Accrington. He played as an inside forward for Arsenal and scored 10 goals. He also joined Tottenham Hotspur in 1894, but played only one game for them in a friendly, as he decided to return to Nottingham and joined Nottingham Forest the same year.
