= James Boyle (footballer, born 1866) =

Scottish footballer

Personal information
- Date of birth: 11 July 1866
- Place of birth: Springburn, Scotland
- Positions: Centre-half; goalkeeper

Senior career*
Years	Team	Apps	(Gls)
- Towerhill
- Celtic
- Clyde
1893–1897	Woolwich Arsenal	61	(7)
- Dartford
- * Club domestic league appearances and goals

James Boyle (born 11 July 1866) was a Scottish footballer who played as a centre-half and goalkeeper in the Football League for Woolwich Arsenal. He had previously played for Celtic and Clyde, and went on to play for Dartford.
