= Charlie Frith (footballer) =

English footballer

Personal information
- Full name: Charles Frith
- Date of birth: 28 May 1868
- Place of birth: Grimsby, England
- Date of death: 28 August 1942 (aged 74)
- Position: Wing half

Senior career*
Years	Team	Apps	(Gls)
1892–1893	Humber Rovers		
1893–1894	Grimsby Town	9	(1)
1894–1???	Fleetwood Rangers		
- * Club domestic league appearances and goals

Charles Frith (28 May 1868 – 28 August 1942) was an English professional footballer who played as a wing half.
