= Harry Woods (footballer) =

English footballer

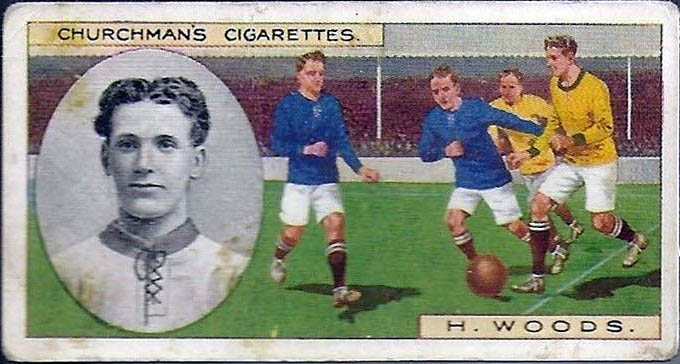

Personal information
- Date of birth: 12 March 1890
- Place of birth: St Helens, England
- Date of death: 1956 (aged 65–66)
- Height: 5 ft 7 1/2 in (1.71 m)
- Position: Inside forward

Senior career*
Years	Team	Apps	(Gls)
1908	St Helens Recreation		
1909	Ashton Town		
1910	St Helens Town		
1911–1915	Norwich City		
1919–1922	South Shields	92	(23)
1922–1923	Newcastle United	14	(2)
1923–1926	Arsenal	70	(21)
1926–1930	Luton Town	97	(22)
1930	North Shields		
- * Club domestic league appearances and goals

Harry Woods (12 March 1890 – 1956) was an English footballer who played as an inside forward. He initially trained as a glass worker whilst playing as an amateur for St Helens Recreation, and then Ashton Town and St Helens Town. In 1911, he joined Norwich City, then in the Southern League, where he played until the outbreak of World War I, making 151 appearances and scoring 37 goals in all competitions.

Woods served in the Tank Corps in France during the war, and finally began his Football League career with South Shields, then in the Second Division, in August 1919. After two seasons with the club, during which he scored 24 times in 95 games, which earned him a £2600 move to Newcastle United in January 1922. Woods failed to settle at St James' Park, however, managing just two goals in 16 appearances before he joined Arsenal on 25 August 1923. He scored ten goals in his first season, helping the Gunners to narrowly avoid relegation, but after Jimmy Brain made his first-team debut in October 1924 and established himself in the side, Woods' opportunities were limited. The team's form improved dramatically after Herbert Chapman was appointed manager in 1925, but Woods played only three times under him, and left for Luton Town in August 1926, where he scored 27 goals in 105 games. He moved back into non-league football with North Shields in 1930.

Woods died in 1956.

== Sources ==
- Harris, Jeff (1995). Hogg, Tony (ed.). Arsenal Who's Who. Independent UK Sports. ISBN 1-899429-03-4.
