= Joe Powell (footballer, born 1870) =

English footballer (1870–1896)

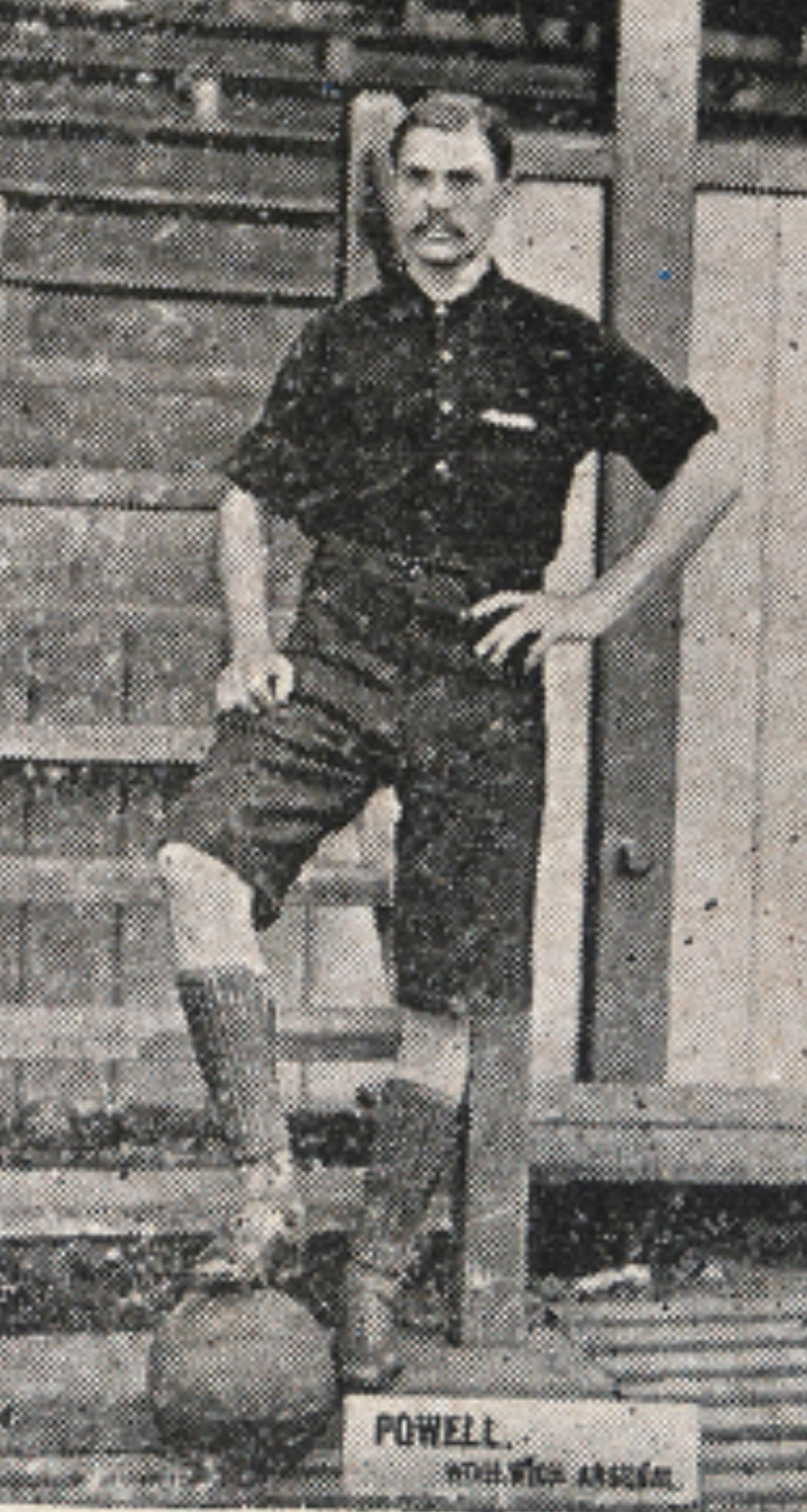

Personal information
- Full name: Joseph Joshua Powell
- Date of birth: 1870
- Place of birth: Bristol, England
- Date of death: 29 November 1896 (aged 26)
- Place of death: Plumstead, London, England
- Position: Right back

Senior career*
Years	Team	Apps	(Gls)
- South Staffordshire Regiment
1892–1896	Woolwich Arsenal	86	(1)
- * Club domestic league appearances and goals

Joseph Joshua Powell (1870 – 29 November 1896) was an English footballer who was captain of Woolwich Arsenal in their first season of League football. He is one of the earliest footballers to die as a result of an injury incurred while playing.

== Career ==
Born in Bristol in 1870, Powell had joined the Army as a young man, and served for six years in the South Staffordshire Regiment. He played football for the regimental team, and impressed enough in a match against the then Royal Arsenal in October 1892 that the club bought him out of the Army and signed him as a professional that December. Having turned professional, Arsenal had been shunned by many other clubs and county associations, and only competed in FA Cup matches and friendlies. A strong and purposeful right back, Powell immediately became a regular in the Arsenal side.

In 1893 Royal Arsenal were accepted into the Football League and joined the Second Division under the new name of Woolwich Arsenal. Powell captained the side in its inaugural match against Newcastle United on 2 September 1893. He went on to play in all but two of the club's League matches that season, and was a near ever-present for the next two seasons as well (missing three and five games respectively). He scored his first and only League goal for Arsenal in a 5–0 victory over Loughborough on 4 January 1896.

== Death from injury ==
In a United League match against Kettering on 23 November 1896, Powell broke his arm (or wrist), subsequently contracting blood poisoning and tetanus. Powell was too ill to travel to Guy's Hospital, so the surgeons had to come to his home to remove his arm. Despite having the arm amputated, he died six days after his injury at his Plumstead home at the age of 26. An inquest jury returned a verdict of accidental death, with no blame attached to anyone involved. He had played 92 League and FA Cup matches for the club.

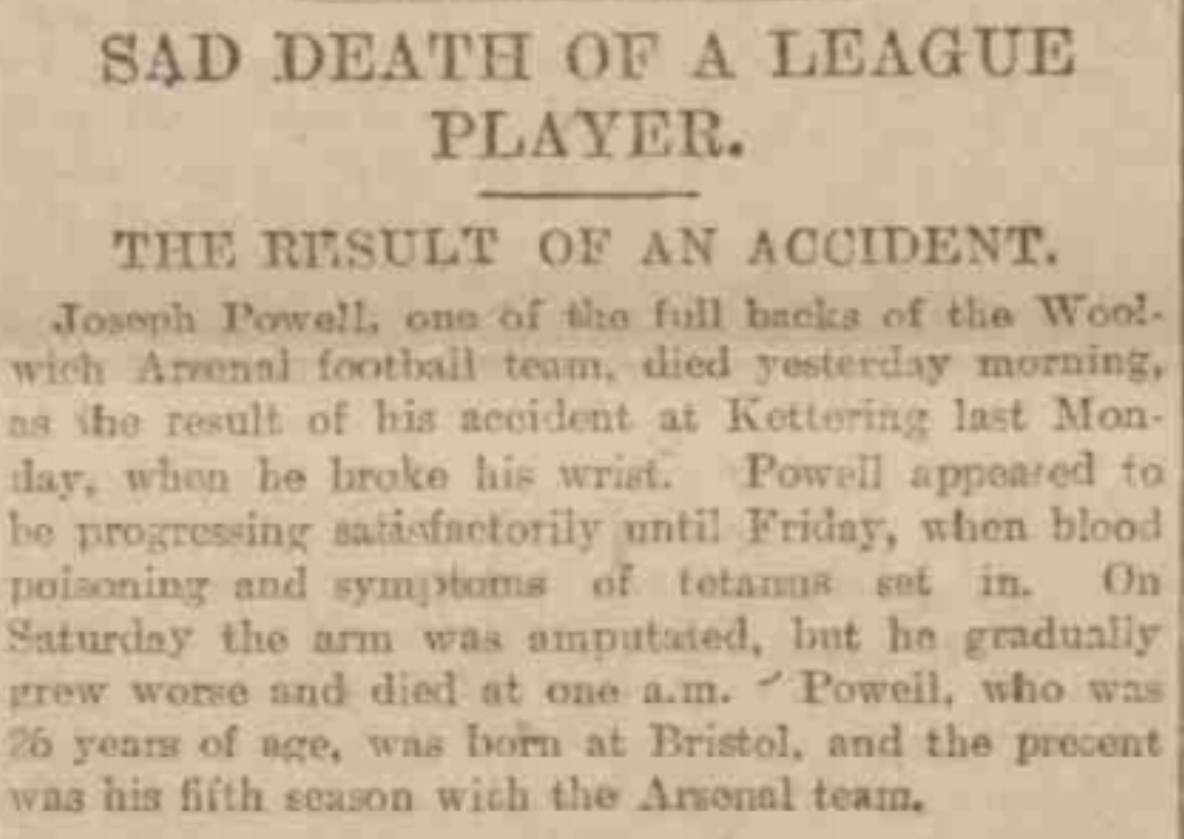
Monday 30 November 1896, taken from the Sheffield Daily Telegraph
