= James Henderson (footballer, born 1867) =

Scottish footballer

James Henderson (born 1867) was a Scottish footballer.

Henderson was born in Thornhill, Dumfries, and first played for the 5th Kirkcudbright Rifle Volunteers and then Rangers; he was a squad player in Rangers 1890–91 Scottish League-title winning season. In 1892 he moved south to London, signing for Woolwich Arsenal. An inside forward, he was a consistent goalscorer in Arsenal's last season before they joined the English Football League; having been boycotted by other sides for their turn to professionalism, these mainly consisted of friendlies and FA Cup matches.

Henderson was a regular in Arsenal's inaugural season in the Second Division, and scored 18 goals in 27 first-class games, finishing as Arsenal's top goalscorer; they finished 9th that season. However, the following season his goalscoring touch deserted him and he was released by the club in the summer of 1895, having played 47 League & Cup matches and scoring 30 goals in total. He played another 49 first-team matches and scored 30 goals in them. He returned to his native Scotland. His fate after that is unknown.
