= 1988–89 Arsenal F.C. season =

English football club season

Arsenal
1988–89 season
- Chairman: Peter Hill-Wood
- Manager: George Graham
- First Division: 1st
- FA Cup: Third round
- League Cup: Third round
- League Centenary Trophy: Winners
- Top goalscorer: League: Alan Smith (23); All: Alan Smith (25)
- Highest home attendance: 54,029 vs. Liverpool (9 November 1988)
- Lowest home attendance: 17,885 vs. Hull City (12 October 1988)
- Average home league attendance: 34,477
Home colours	Away colours

The 1988–89 season was the 94th in the history of Arsenal Football Club and their 63rd consecutive season in the top flight of English football. It began on 1 July 1988 and concluded on 30 June 1989, with competitive matches played between August and May. The club ended its 18-year wait for the league title by winning the Football League First Division championship in the most closely fought title race in the competition's history. Arsenal beat Liverpool 2–0 in the final match of the season to take the title on goals scored, as both clubs shared the same points total and goal difference. During the season Arsenal also enjoyed success in the Football League Centenary Trophy, but exited the League Cup to Liverpool in the third round and fell at the same stage of the FA Cup to West Ham United.

Earlier in the year manager George Graham had started to assemble a squad with a blend of youth and experience. Having already signed defenders Steve Bould and Lee Dixon, he set about trimming the squad letting Steve Williams and Kenny Sansom leave. Arsenal were not considered favourites for the league title at the start of the season, but a 5–1 win away at Wimbledon on the opening day led to talk over their chances. They continued their fine start to the campaign, particularly away from home and led the table from the Christmas period. At one stage Arsenal were 11 points clear of Liverpool, but a series of draws and surprising defeats allowed the gap to be closed. By the time Arsenal faced Liverpool on the final day, they were faced with an improbable challenge – winning by a two-goal margin against the defending champions to claim the title. Graham's cautious approach paid dividends as Arsenal led after the break, and deep into stoppage time midfielder Michael Thomas scored the all-important second goal.

17 different players represented Arsenal in four competitions and there were 14 different goalscorers. Arsenal's top goalscorer was Alan Smith, who scored 25 goals in 46 appearances. Smith and David Rocastle were the only Arsenal representatives in the PFA Team of the Year. Forward Paul Merson was named the PFA Young Player of the Year, an award voted for by his fellow peers. Once the league season finished, Arsenal players and staff paraded the trophy before a crowd of 250,000 on their way to a civic reception.

== Background ==
In May 1986, George Graham was appointed as Arsenal manager. He made an instant impact, guiding his team to League Cup success, and the club finished fourth in the Football League First Division. Arsenal however slipped to sixth in the league the following season, and lost out to Luton Town in the League Cup final a year later. Graham sought to resolve inconsistencies by freshening up his squad, promoting number of academy graduates while selling ageing players. By the summer of 1988, he achieved a blend of youth and experience, but little was thought of Arsenal's chances of winning the First Division.

=== Transfers ===
Arsenal sold a number of fringe players throughout the season so Graham could freshen the squad with new players. Having already signed Lee Dixon and Steve Bould from Stoke City, defender Kenny Sansom became surplus to requirement and eventually joined Newcastle United. Steve Williams was sold to Luton Town for £300,000 in June 1988. as the player felt first-team opportunities were scarce; the fee Luton paid was £100,000 less than Arsenal originally wanted. Graham Rix went to Caen on a free transfer. Other transfers saw Rhys Wilmot leave the club he joined as a trainee in 1977 after failing to displace John Lukic as first choice, and Andy Marriott left to join Brian Clough's Nottingham Forest in a deal worth £50,000.

Out

Position	Player	Transferred from	Fee	Date	Ref
MF	Graham Rix	Caen	Free	22 June 1988	
MF	Steve Williams	Luton Town	£300,000	22 July 1988	
DF	Kenny Sansom	Newcastle United	£300,000	23 December 1988	
GK	Rhys Wilmot	Plymouth Argyle	£100,000	14 July 1989	
GK	Andy Marriott	Nottingham Forest	£50,000	20 June 1989	

Loan out

Position	Player	Club	Date	Return	Ref
GK	Rhys Wilmot	Swansea City	23 February 1989	End of the season	
GK	Alan Miller	Plymouth Argyle	24 November 1988	End of the season	
FW	Kevin Campbell	Leyton Orient	16 January 1989	End of the season	

== Pre-season and friendlies ==
23 July 1988 1	Yeovil Town	0–5	Arsenal	Yeovil
			Davis; Marwood; Hayes; Richardson; Merson	Stadium: Huish Park

2 August 1988 2	Örebro (Sweden)	1–1	Arsenal	Örebro
			Smith

4 August 1988 3	Anundsjö (Sweden)	1–3	Arsenal	Bredbyn
			Rocastle; O'Leary

9 August 1988 4	Enköping (Sweden)	0–6	Arsenal	Enköping
			Merson; Rocastle; Groves

13 August 1988 Wembley Int. Tournament	Arsenal	4–0	Tottenham Hotspur	London
	Marwood; Merson; Smith	Report		Stadium: Wembley; Attendance: 30,104

14 August 1988 Wembley Int. Tournament	Arsenal	3–0	(Germany) Bayern Munich	London
	Smith; Dixon			Stadium: Wembley; Attendance: 27,364

16 August 1988 5	Birmingham City	0–4	Arsenal	Birmingham
			Marwood; Merson; Smith	Stadium: St Andrew's; Attendance: 2,422

19 August 1988 6	Leicester City	1–4	Arsenal	Leicester
			Thomas; Adams; Smith; Own goal

13 December 1988 7	Shrewsbury Town	1–2	Arsenal	Shrewsbury
			Davis; Ampadu

25 January 1989 8	Somerset Cricket Club (Bermuda)	0–1	Arsenal	Bermuda
			Hayes

27 January 1989 9	Bermuda National XI	2–4	Arsenal	Bermuda
			Richardson; Smith; Winterburn

14 February 1989 10	Arsenal	2–0	France	London
19:30	Smith; Hayes	Report		Stadium: Highbury; Attendance: 21,785

== Football League First Division ==
A total of 20 teams competed in the First Division in the 1988–89 season. Each team played 38 matches; two against every other team and one match at each club's stadium. Three points were awarded for each win, one point per draw, and none for defeats.

=== August–November ===
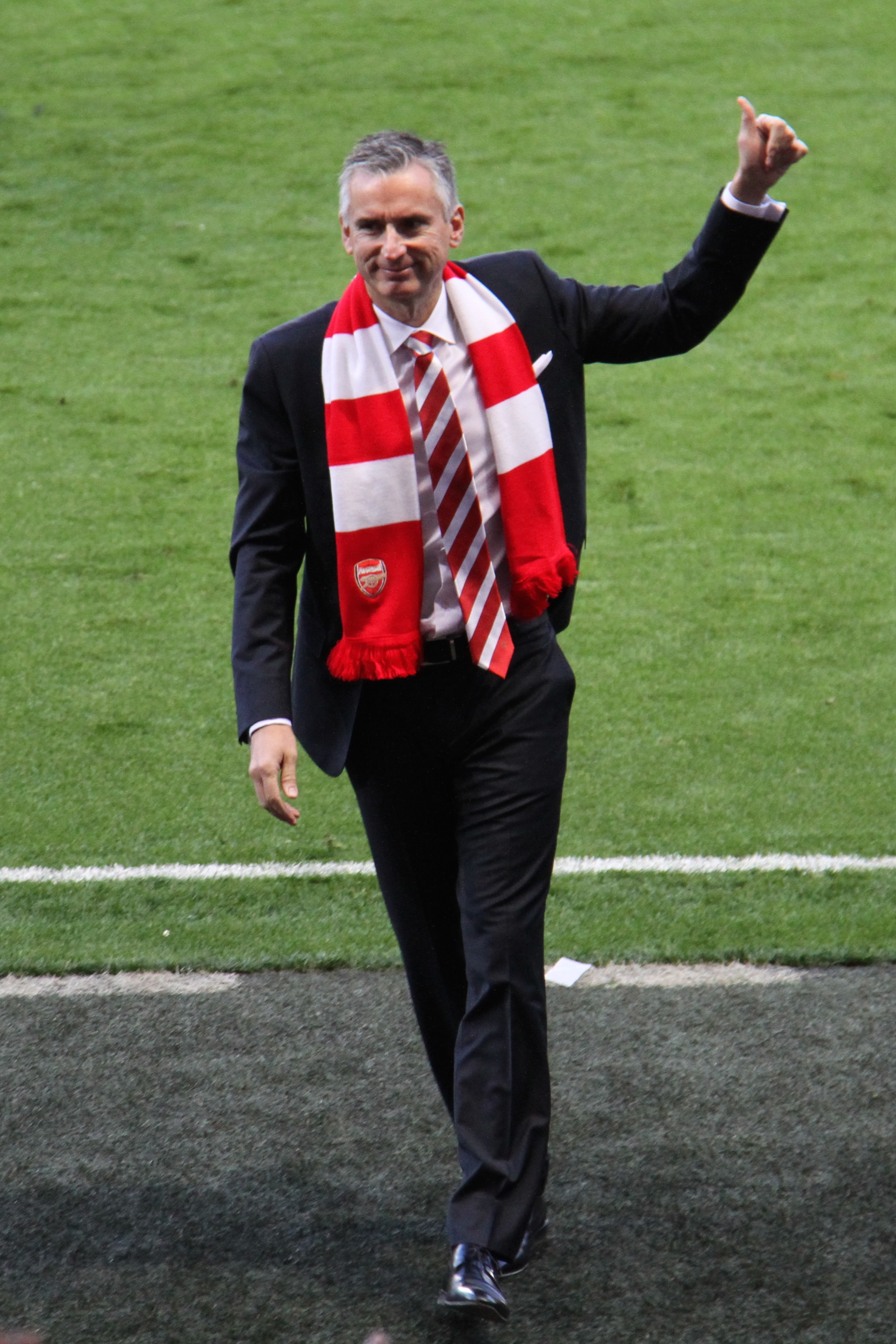
Alan Smith (pictured in 2014) reached the 10-goal mark for Arsenal in October, against Queens Park Rangers.

Arsenal began the league season away at Plough Lane, where they faced Wimbledon on 27 August 1988. The team started badly, going a goal behind after eight minutes but came back to win 5–1 with Alan Smith scoring a hat-trick. The manner of Arsenal's comeback had journalist Dennis Signy mulling over the club's chances of winning the league; he wrote in his Times match report: "...the Gunners made the bookmakers' odds of 16–1 against them for the championship look generous." At Highbury, Arsenal were beaten by newly promoted Aston Villa; for much of the first half Graham's side struggled to break through Villa's back five. The visitors were two goals up in the match before Arsenal equalised in the space of ten minutes. Andy Gray scored the winner in the 62nd minute from a free-kick contentiously awarded by the referee. Arsenal then faced Tottenham Hotspur in the season's first North London Derby, staged at White Hart Lane. A fast-paced and open first-half saw five goals in 17 minutes with Arsenal running out 3–2 winners. Graham later described it a "great" and "wonderful advertisement for the game", and felt the supporters and media would go away happy. Arsenal's home form continued to blight them as the team dropped two points against Southampton on 17 September 1988. The match was best remembered for an altercation between Paul Davis and Glenn Cockerill. The Arsenal midfielder punched Cockerill which was missed by the referee, but caught on camera. Davis was later banned for nine matches and handed a record £3,000 fine. Arsenal ended the month with a 2–1 defeat away to Sheffield Wednesday and sat in seventh position.

"He's anaemic, but he's leading the line superbly," was Graham's assessment of Smith as the striker scored two goals in Arsenal's 4–1 win at West Ham United. David Rocastle and Michael Thomas were the other goalscorers, contributing to the team's 13 league goals in four away matches. Goals from Adams and Smith saw Arsenal defeat Queens Park Rangers at home two weeks later, but they were held to a 1–1 draw at Luton Town despite dominating much of the game. Adams scored his second league goal of the season, at home to Coventry City to earn three points for the team. They also extended their unbeaten run in all competitions to seven matches. Kevin Richardson and Brian Marwood were singled out for praise by journalist Vince Wright, with the former "doing an excellent job on [David] Speedie," and the latter seemingly "involved in every penetrating move".

A live match audience witnessed Arsenal trounce Nottingham Forest at the City Ground in early November. Steve Bould, Brian Marwood, Adams and Smith each scored as the team came back from a goal behind to win. "It was a performance of true quality which must have made excellent viewing," was Graham's verdict and he described it as "satisfying" to beat Forest at their home ground. Arsenal were not at their fluent best against Newcastle United though came away from St James' Park with a clean sheet and a 1–0 win – Bould scored for the second successive match. Paul Merson scored twice against Middlesbrough as Arsenal recorded a 3–0 win and moved into second place, just two points behind Norwich City. Arsenal's five England internationals, who featured against Saudi Arabia a week before, were lauded in The Times for their performances, despite playing tamely for country. The match reporter suggested the club versus country dilemma could be solved by including more Arsenal players, something Graham was sceptical about when put to him. "I want England to do very well. It's just I want Arsenal to do better," he said. Arsenal's unbeaten run came to an end against Derby County, where at the Baseball Ground a debatable penalty was awarded to the home side which allowed them to get back into the game.

=== December–February ===
The visit of champions Liverpool in early December was seen by Graham and the media as a test of Arsenal's championship credentials. Arsenal entered the match boasting the division's best attacking record, while Liverpool conceded the fewest in the competition. In the game Liverpool went ahead through left winger John Barnes, but their lead was short lived as Smith equalised. Both sides spurned chances to win the game late on and the score stayed 1–1 at full time; Kenny Dalglish, the Liverpool player-manager however was delighted with a point and said afterwards: "That was as entertaining as any of the other four games we have played against each other this season." Arsenal failed to score for the first time in the season when they played league leaders Norwich City on 10 December 1988. The team returned to winning ways during the Christmas period. More than 37,000 spectators saw Arsenal defeat Manchester United by two goals to one, and on Boxing Day a brace from Marwood ensured Arsenal beat Charlton Athletic to go top of the league table. They continued their good form on New Year's Eve, beating Aston Villa 3–0.

The Highbury clock was unveiled in an elevated position before the game against Tottenham Hotspur as part of the ground's refurbishment work. Merson and Thomas scored a goal apiece against their bitter rivals, handing the team a fourth straight league win and send them two points clear of Norwich City. Match reporter Clive White conceded Tottenham had a legitimate claim for a penalty in the first half, but felt they never merited anything from the game, contrasting the visitor's disappointing play to Arsenal – "the epitome of pure, free-flowing football". The team continued their good away form by taking apart Everton at Goodison Park. Graham labelled his team as "nice and solid" after a goalless first half and the visitors sprung to life in the second, scoring three goals. Richardson, scorer of Arsenal's third, assessed the squad was more experienced than last year, adding "Everybody knows what they have to do." Arsenal failed to record a sixth straight win as Sheffield Wednesday held on for a 1–1 draw at Highbury the following weekend.

Victory against West Ham United moved Arsenal 10 points clear of third-place Coventry City and significantly ahead of defending champions Liverpool. The team came from behind against Millwall to seal another win. Their performance up until the second half was insipid, and after the interval they did as their manager asked and "upped their tempo" in search of an equaliser. Marwood eventually scored and the midfielder had a part to play in Smith getting the winning goal. Arsenal dropped two points away to Queens Park Rangers and were beaten by Coventry City – Bould conceded a late second-half penalty which was converted by Brian Kilcline. John Sillett, the manager of Coventry City felt pressure on Arsenal was "beginning to tell on them" and wanted to exploit that. Smith and Perry Groves each scored in Arsenal's 2–0 win against Luton Town, but February ended with a goalless draw at home to Millwall. Doubts were raised over Arsenal's championship credentials as Millwall successfully nullified their opponents' attacking threat. The visitors' own attacking duo – Teddy Sheringham and Tony Cascarino got the better of a struggling Adams, who was fortunate not to have conceded a penalty in the first half. Though Arsenal remained in first place after 27 matches, the gap built at the start of the calendar year was diminishing.

=== March–May ===
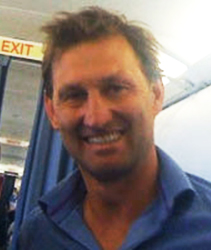
Tony Adams was the target of jibes by opposition fans throughout the season. A Daily Mirror back page depicted him as a donkey after a match in April 1989.

Arsenal's limitations were laid bare at home to Nottingham Forest as they were beaten 3–1. Clough's team, "the supreme masters of the counter-attack", produced a first-half performance of quality and hit the hosts on the break to score three times. Arsenal's form dipped as they drew 2–2 with Charlton Athletic, leaving themselves 11 points ahead of Liverpool, who had three games in hand. Davis returned to the line-up for only his third league start since October, and made a noticeable difference, "restor[ing] Arsenal's confidence" and gave their attack "imagination". He put Arsenal 2–1 up in the match, but Charlton equalised when Steve MacKenzie raced into the penalty area and from the right unleashed a shot that bobbled over Lukic.

Consecutive away fixtures brought mixed results; Arsenal beat Southampton 3–1 before drawing one-all at Old Trafford against Manchester United. Adams, a target for jeers by the crowd, had scored at both ends. The day after the game he saw a picture of himself on the back page of the Daily Mirror with donkey ears. The jibes affected Adams privately, but he later recollected how it motivated him to "play that much better". Arsenal strengthened their position at the top of the table with four straight wins, conceding no goals. Lee Dixon and Niall Quinn each scored against Everton and the team then beat Newcastle United by a single goal. It was a "nervous" performance and "hardly the stuff of potential champions", reflected by the narrow scoreline, though the team did create notable chances throughout the game. Richardson and Marwood were denied by last-ditch tackles, interventions and goalkeeping saves.

Arsenal turned on the style against Norwich City a few weeks later, recording their biggest win of the season. Smith, Thomas, Rocastle and Nigel Winterburn were all on the scoresheet and the 5–0 victory opened up a six-point gap at the top of the table. The Guardian correspondent David Lacey opined that the combination play between Smith and Merson was "crucial to Arsenal's momentum" as was Rocastle's athleticism down the right. Martin Hayes made a rare start for Arsenal and crucially scored the winner against Middlesbrough, all but relegating the North-East side. The absence of Davis, out with an injury, was felt as Arsenal unexpectedly lost at home to Derby County. In their final home match of the season Arsenal were held to a 2–2 draw by Wimbledon, paving the way for Liverpool to leapfrog them into first place and move three points clear. With one game remaining, Arsenal's title chances were as good as over.

==== Title decider ====
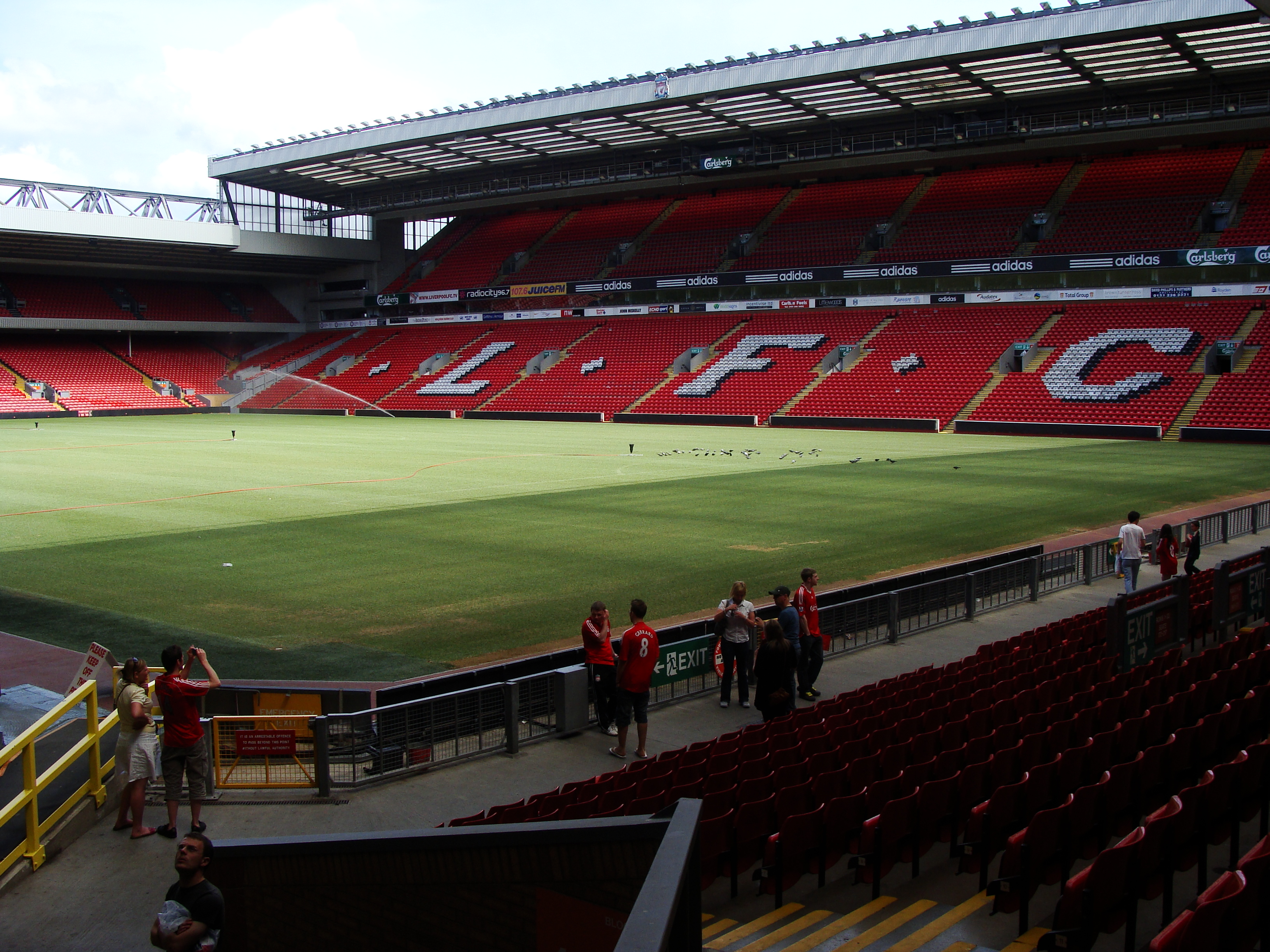
Anfield (pictured in 2009) was the setting for the final league game of the season, between Arsenal and Liverpool.

Arsenal's final match of the league season – against Liverpool, was originally scheduled a month earlier, but the events at Hillsborough, which saw 96 of Liverpool's supporters crushed to death in a stadium disaster, meant the game was postponed and rearranged. By the time the fixture drew ever closer, both clubs were close enough on points for it to act as a title decider; the odds however were against Arsenal as they had not won at Anfield in 15 years. Liverpool moreover had not lost by two goals – the margin Arsenal required to win the championship – in three years.

The game took place on a Friday evening and was televised to a national audience of over 12 million. Graham made a slight adjustment to his team's formation, bringing David O'Leary in to play as a sweeper in a back five. His thinking was to nullify Liverpool's attacking threat and for much of the first half, Arsenal stemmed their opponents' usual passing game. In the second half, Smith scored, but it looked increasingly likely the title would remain at Anfield as Arsenal struggled to increase their lead. However, deep into stoppage time, Thomas evaded a challenge by Steve Nicol and raced into the penalty area, before slipping the ball past advancing Bruce Grobbelaar to make the score 2–0. The final whistle was blown seconds later, ending Arsenal's 18-year wait to be crowned league champions. Described as "the most dramatic finish in the 120-year history of the English top flight" by BBC Sport in 2008, the title decider at Anfield generated interest in the sport and the events were depicted in Nick Hornby's best-selling book Fever Pitch.

=== Results ===
27 August 1988 1	Wimbledon	1–5	Arsenal	London
16:00 BST	Fashanu 8'		Marwood 16' Smith 24', 27', 58' Merson 85'	Stadium: Plough Lane; Attendance: 15,710; Referee: John Martin (England)

3 September 1988 2	Arsenal	2–3	Aston Villa	London
15:00 BST	Marwood 52' Smith 57'		McInally 28', 48'; Gray 59'	Stadium: Highbury; Attendance: 37,417; Referee: Dennis Hedges (England)

10 September 1988 3	Tottenham Hotspur	2–3	Arsenal	London
15:00 BST	Waddle 25' Gascoigne 40'		Winterburn 20' Marwood 29' Smith 30'	Stadium: White Hart Lane; Attendance: 32,621; Referee: Lester Shapter (England)

17 September 1988 4	Arsenal	2–2	Southampton	London
	Marwood (pen.); Smith			Stadium: Highbury; Attendance: 31,384

24 September 1988 5	Sheffield Wednesday	2–1	Arsenal	Sheffield
			Smith	Stadium: Hillsborough; Attendance: 17,830

1 October 1988 6	West Ham United	1–4	Arsenal	London
			Smith; Thomas; Rocastle	Stadium: Upton Park; Attendance: 27,658

22 October 1988 7	Arsenal	2–1	Queens Park Rangers	London
	Adams; Smith			Stadium: Highbury; Attendance: 33,202

25 October 1988 8	Luton Town	1–1	Arsenal	Luton
			Smith	Stadium: Kenilworth Road; Attendance: 10,548

29 October 1988 9	Arsenal	2–0	Coventry City	London
	Thomas; Adams			Stadium: Highbury; Attendance: 31,273

6 November 1988 10	Nottingham Forest	1–4	Arsenal	Nottingham
			Smith; Bould; Adams; Marwood	Stadium: City Ground; Attendance: 19,038

12 November 1988 11	Newcastle United	0–1	Arsenal	Newcastle
			Bould	Stadium: St James' Park; Attendance: 24,003

19 November 1988 12	Arsenal	3–0	Middlesbrough	London
	Merson; Rocastle			Stadium: Highbury; Attendance: 32,294

26 November 1988 13	Derby County	2–1	Arsenal	Derby
			Thomas	Stadium: Baseball Ground; Attendance: 21,209

4 December 1988 14	Arsenal	1–1	Liverpool	London
	Smith			Stadium: Highbury; Attendance: 31,863

10 December 1988 15	Norwich City	0–0	Arsenal	Norwich
				Stadium: Carrow Road; Attendance: 23,069

17 December 1988 16	Arsenal	2–1	Manchester United	London
	Thomas; Merson			Stadium: Highbury; Attendance: 37,422

26 December 1988 17	Charlton Athletic	2–3	Arsenal	London
			(pen.) Marwood; Merson	Stadium: Selhurst Park; Attendance: 18,439

31 December 1988 18	Aston Villa	0–3	Arsenal	Birmingham
			Smith; Rocastle; Groves	Stadium: Villa Park; Attendance: 32,486

2 January 1989 19	Arsenal	2–0	Tottenham Hotspur	London
	Merson; Thomas			Stadium: Highbury; Attendance: 45,129

14 January 1989 20	Everton	1–3	Arsenal	Liverpool
			Merson; Smith; Richardson	Stadium: Goodison Park; Attendance: 34,825

21 January 1989 21	Arsenal	1–1	Sheffield Wednesday	London
	Merson			Stadium: Highbury; Attendance: 33,490

4 February 1989 22	Arsenal	2–1	West Ham United	London
	Smith; Groves			Stadium: Highbury; Attendance: 40,139

11 February 1989 23	Millwall	1–2	Arsenal	London
			Marwood; Smith	Stadium: The Den; Attendance: 21,854

18 February 1989 24	Queens Park Rangers	0–0	Arsenal	London
				Stadium: Loftus Road; Attendance: 20,543

21 February 1989 25	Coventry City	1–0	Arsenal	Coventry
				Stadium: Highfield Road; Attendance: 21,390

25 February 1989 26	Arsenal	2–0	Luton Town	London
	Groves; Smith			Stadium: Highbury; Attendance: 31,012

28 February 1989 27	Arsenal	0–0	Millwall	London
				Stadium: Highbury; Attendance: 37,524

11 March 1989 28	Arsenal	1–3	Nottingham Forest	London
	Smith			Stadium: Highbury; Attendance: 39,639

21 March 1989 29	Arsenal	2–2	Charlton Athletic	London
	Rocastle; Davis			Stadium: Highbury; Attendance: 30,259

25 March 1989 30	Southampton	1–3	Arsenal	Southampton
			Groves; Rocastle; Merson	Stadium: The Dell; Attendance: 19,202

2 April 1989 31	Manchester United	1–1	Arsenal	Manchester
			Adams	Stadium: Old Trafford; Attendance: 37,977

8 April 1989 32	Arsenal	2–0	Everton	London
	Dixon; Quinn			Stadium: Highbury; Attendance: 37,608

15 April 1989 33	Arsenal	1–0	Newcastle United	London
	Marwood			Stadium: Highbury; Attendance: 38,023

1 May 1989 34	Arsenal	5–0	Norwich City	London
	Smith; Winterburn; Thomas; Rocastle			Stadium: Highbury; Attendance: 28,449

6 May 1989 35	Middlesbrough	0–1	Arsenal	Middlesbrough
			Hayes	Stadium: Ayresome Park; Attendance: 21,803

13 May 1989 36	Arsenal	1–2	Derby County	London
	Smith			Stadium: Highbury; Attendance: 41,008

17 May 1989 37	Arsenal	2–2	Wimbledon	London
	Winterburn; Merson			Stadium: Highbury; Attendance: 39,132

26 May 1989 38	Liverpool	0–2	Arsenal	Liverpool
20:05 BST		Report	Smith 52'; Thomas 90+1'	Stadium: Anfield; Attendance: 41,783; Referee: David Hutchinson (Oxfordshire)

=== Classification ===
Pos	Team	Pld	W	D	L	GF	GA	GD	Pts	Qualification or relegation
1	Arsenal (C)	38	22	10	6	73	36	+37	76	Disqualified from the European Cup
2	Liverpool (Note: Liverpool would have qualified as FA Cup winners.)	38	22	10	6	65	28	+37	76	Disqualified from the European Cup Winners' Cup
3	Nottingham Forest (Note: Nottingham Forest would have qualified as League Cup winners.)	38	17	13	8	64	43	+21	64	Disqualified from the UEFA Cup
4	Norwich City	38	17	11	10	48	45	+3	62	Disqualified from the UEFA Cup
5	Derby County	38	17	7	14	40	38	+2	58	

Source: World Football
Rules for classification: 1) Points; 2) Goal difference; 3) Goals scored
(C) Champions

==== Results summary ====
Overall								Home						Away					
Pld	W	D	L	GF	GA	GD	Pts	W	D	L	GF	GA	GD	W	D	L	GF	GA	GD
38	22	10	6	73	36	+37	76	10	6	3	35	19	+16	12	4	3	38	17	+21

==== Results by round ====
Round	1	2	3	4	5	6	7	8	9	10	11	12	13	14	15	16	17	18	19	20	21	22	23	24	25	26	27	28	29	30	31	32	33	34	35	36	37	38
Ground	A	H	A	H	A	A	H	A	H	A	A	H	A	H	A	H	A	A	H	A	H	H	A	A	A	H	H	H	H	A	A	H	H	H	A	H	H	A
Result	W	L	W	D	L	W	W	D	W	W	W	W	L	D	D	W	W	W	W	W	D	W	W	D	L	W	D	L	D	W	D	W	W	W	W	L	D	W
Position	1	8	6	5	7	6	4	3	2	2	2	2	2	2	2	2	1	1	1	1	1	1	1	1	1	1	1	1	1	1	1	1	1	1	1	1	2	1

A = Away; H = Home; W = Win; D = Draw; L = Loss

== FA Cup ==
Arsenal entered the FA Cup in the third round (last 64), in which they were drawn to face fellow First Division club West Ham United away from home. Their time in the competition was brief; Arsenal resiliently came from two goals down at Upton Park to force a replay, but they lost the tie at home by a single goal. Graham commended West Ham's approach afterwards, admitting they had done "...a very good job on us. They stopped us scoring and hoped they would nick one."

=== Match results ===
Key

- In result column, Arsenal's score shown first
- H = Home match
- A = Away match
- pen. = Penalty kick
- o.g. = Own goal

Date	Round	Opponents	Venue	Result	Scorers	Attendance
8 January 1989	Third	West Ham United (A)	Upton Park	2–2	Merson (2)	22,017
11 January 1989	Third (replay)	West Ham United (H)	Highbury	0–1		44,124

== Football League Cup ==
Arsenal entered the Football League Cup in the second round, where they were drawn against Hull City in a two-legged tie. At Boothferry Park, Marwood scored against his former side in a 2–1 win. Arsenal made light work of the second leg, where at Highbury Smith scored twice to make certain of progress into the fourth round. It was at that stage the team exited the competition, against Liverpool. The original tie at Anfield ended in a 1–1 draw, which meant it was replayed at Highbury. Both sides failed to convert their chances over 90 minutes, resulting in a second replay at Villa Park. Merson opened the scoring, before Steve McMahon brought Liverpool level and then his teammate John Aldridge got their second to knock Arsenal out of the competition.

=== Match results ===
Key

- In result column, Arsenal's score shown first
- H = Home match
- A = Away match
- N = Neutral match
- pen. = Penalty kick
- o.g. = Own goal

Date	Round	Opponents	Venue	Result	Scorers	Attendance
28 September 1988	Second (1st leg)	Hull City (A)	Kingston-upon-Hull	2–1	Winterburn, Marwood	11,450
12 October 1988	Second (2nd leg)	Hull City (H)	Highbury	3–0	Smith (2), Merson	17,885
2 November 1988	Third	Liverpool (A)	Anfield	1–1	Rocastle	31,951
9 November 1988	Third (replay)	Liverpool (H)	Highbury	0–0		54,029
23 November 1988	Third (second replay)	Liverpool (N)	Villa Park	1–2	Merson	21,708

== Football League Centenary Trophy ==
The Football League Centenary Trophy was held during the 1988–89 season to celebrate the 100th birthday of the Football League. It was a knockout competition, between the top eight sides from the 1987–88 First Division. In the quarter-final stage, Arsenal played Queens Park Rangers. Goals from Adams and Marwood were enough to send the club into the following round, where they then faced a makeshift Liverpool side at home. Arsenal took the lead in the tie, when Groves scored, but with 10 minutes of normal time remaining Steve Staunton equalised for the visitors. Arsenal quickly regained the lead however when Marwood's volley looped over goalkeeper Mike Hooper and into the net.

The final, staged at Villa Park, pitted Arsenal against Manchester United. Arsenal raced into a 2–0 lead before half-time, but United finished the game strongly and Clayton Blackmore scored to make it a tense finale. Graham's side however held on for the trophy, and the club also received a prize fund of £50,000.

31 August 1988 Quarter-final	Queens Park Rangers	0–2	Arsenal	London
			Adams 3, Marwood 76	Stadium: Loftus Road; Attendance: 10,019

20 September 1988 Semi-final	Arsenal	2–1	Liverpool	London
	Groves 33, Marwood 82,		Staunton 80	Stadium: Highbury; Attendance: 29,135

9 October 1988 Final	Arsenal	2–1	Manchester United	Birmingham
	Davis 36; Thomas 40		Blackmore 84	Stadium: Villa Park; Attendance: 22,182

== Squad statistics ==
Arsenal used a total of 17 players during the 1988–89 season and there were 14 different goalscorers. Thomas featured in 47 matches – the most of any Arsenal player in the campaign. Lukic, Winterburn and Rocastle started in all 38 league matches. The team scored a total of 88 goals in all competitions. The top goalscorer was Smith, with 25 goals – 23 of which were scored in the league.

Smith and Rocastle were the only Arsenal players named in the PFA Team of the Year for 1988–89; for Rocastle, it was his second consecutive appearance, as he featured in the line up a season ago. Merson was awarded the PFA Young Player of the Year in April 1989, an award voted by his fellow peers and professionals. The ceremony, which was held at London's Hilton Hotel, took place a day after the Hillsborough tragedy. A minute's silence was held and pre-planned extravaganzas were cancelled in respect.

Key

No. = Squad number

Pos = Playing position

Nat. = Nationality

Apps = Appearances

GK = Goalkeeper

DF = Defender

MF = Midfielder

FW = Forward

Pos.	Nat.	Name	League		FA Cup		League Cup		Centenary Trophy		Total	
Pos.	Nat.	Name	Apps	Goals	Apps	Goals	Apps	Goals	Apps	Goals	Apps	Goals
GK	(England)	John Lukic	38	0	2	0	5	0	3	0	48	0
DF	(England)	Nigel Winterburn	38	3	2	0	5	1	3	0	48	3
DF	(England)	Lee Dixon	31 (2)	1	1	0	5	0	2	0	39 (2)	1
DF	(England)	Tony Adams	36	4	2	0	5	0	3	1	46	5
DF	(England)	Steve Bould	26 (4)	2	1	0	5	0	1	0	33 (4)	2
DF	(Republic of Ireland)	David O'Leary	26	0	2	0	0	0	2	0	30	0
DF	(England)	Gus Caesar	2	0	0	0	0	0	0	0	2	0
MF	(England)	David Rocastle	38	6	2	0	5	1	3	0	48	7
MF	(England)	Michael Thomas	33 (4)	7	2	0	5	0	3	1	43 (4)	8
FW	(England)	Brian Marwood	31	9	2	0	5	1	3	2	41	12
MF	(England)	Kevin Richardson	32 (2)	1	2	0	3 (2)	0	2	0	39 (4)	1
MF	(England)	Paul Davis	11 (1)	1	(2)	0	2	0	2	1	15 (3)	2
MF	(England)	Perry Groves	6 (15)	4	(2)	0	1 (1)	0	2	1	9 (18)	4
FW	(England)	Alan Smith	36	23	2	0	5	2	3	0	46	25
FW	(England)	Paul Merson	29 (8)	10	2	2	4	2	1 (1)	0	36 (9)	14
MF	(England)	Martin Hayes	3 (14)	1	0	0	(4)	0	(2)	0	3 (20)	1
FW	(Republic of Ireland)	Niall Quinn	2 (1)	1	0	0	0	0	0	0	2 (1)	1

== See also ==
- 1988–89 in English football
- List of Arsenal F.C. seasons
