= 1986–87 Arsenal F.C. season =

English football club season

Arsenal F.C.
1986–87 season
- Chairman: Peter Hill-Wood
- Manager: George Graham
- First Division: 4th
- FA Cup: Quarter-finals
- League Cup: Winners
- Top goalscorer: League: Martin Hayes (19); All: Martin Hayes (24)
Home colours	Away colours

The 1986–87 season was Arsenal Football Club's 61st consecutive season in the top flight of English football. The first season managed by George Graham, Arsenal improved on their seventh-place performance in the 1985-86 season by ending the campaign in 4th. Graham also helped Arsenal to their first major trophy in eight years, winning the 1987 League Cup.

One notable piece of business in the transfer window was the purchase of striker Alan Smith, but Arsenal immediately loaned him back to his former club Leicester for the rest of the season.

Tony Adams was voted PFA Young Player of the Year after featuring in all of Arsenal's games.

== Season summary ==
This season saw the return of their former player George Graham as manager. Graham had been appointed just after the end of the previous season as successor to Don Howe who had resigned in late March. He had been a member of Arsenal's double winning team in 1971, but Arsenal had gone since 1979 without winning a major trophy, finishing seventh in the two seasons leading up to Graham's arrival and finishing as low as 10th in 1983.

On 9 June 1986 Graham’s first transfer activity was to sell Martin Keown to Aston Villa for £125,000, after refusing him an extra £50 a week, and giving a young Tony Adams the chance to establish himself in the side. Perry Groves was signed from Colchester on 4 September for £75,000. He made his debut as a sub one week later against Luton Town.

Arsenal started the season well and were top of the league from mid-November to late January. Arsenal showed qualities of teamwork based on a traditional solidity in defence which might have prolonged their challenge but for injuries to key players, most notably Paul Davis, and a 10-match winless run went against their title hopes in the second half of the season, and they eventually finished fourth, with Everton finishing champions for the second time in three seasons. Though Arsenal finished fourth in Graham’s first season in charge, Arsenal did win the Football League Cup, in a campaign marked by comebacks. Arsenal faced Tottenham Hotspur in the semi-finals; after losing 1–0 at Highbury in the first leg and conceding a second goal in the first half of the second leg at White Hart Lane, Arsenal scored twice through Viv Anderson and Niall Quinn to draw 2–2 on aggregate and force a replay; in the replay Spurs went 1–0 up, only for Arsenal to come back again with late goals from Ian Allinson and David Rocastle to win. The Wembley final against Liverpool was a repeat performance; after Arsenal had gone 1–0 down to an Ian Rush goal, two Charlie Nicholas goals brought Arsenal their first League Cup triumph and their first major trophy for eight years. However, UEFA voted to continue the ban on English clubs in European competitions that was imposed in the wake of the Heysel disaster in 1985 for a third season, and this meant that Arsenal were unable to compete in the 1987–88 UEFA-Cup.

Tony Adams, the 20-year-old centre-half who played in every single game for Arsenal this season, was voted PFA Young Player of the Year. Striker Niall Quinn and wingers David Rocastle and Martin Hayes both became regular members of the first team this season, with Hayes finishing as Arsenal's top scorer with 24 goals in all competitions.

== Squad ==
Note: Flags indicate national team as defined under FIFA eligibility rules; some limited exceptions apply. Players may hold more than one non-FIFA nationality.

Pos.	Nation	Player
GK	ENG	John Lukic
DF	ENG	Viv Anderson
DF	ENG	Kenny Sansom (captain)
MF	ENG	Steve Williams
DF	IRL	David O'Leary
DF	ENG	Tony Adams
MF	ENG	David Rocastle
MF	ENG	Paul Davis
FW	IRL	Niall Quinn
FW	SCO	Charlie Nicholas
MF	ENG	Martin Hayes

Pos.	Nation	Player
MF	ENG	Perry Groves
MF	ENG	Graham Rix
MF	ENG	Michael Thomas
DF	ENG	Gus Caesar
GK	WAL	Rhys Wilmot
MF	ENG	Ian Allinson
FW	ENG	Paul Merson
MF	ENG	Stewart Robson

== Results ==
=== First Division ===
Pos	Team	Pld	W	D	L	GF	GA	GD	Pts	Qualification or relegation
2	Liverpool	42	23	8	11	72	42	+30	77	Disqualified from the UEFA Cup
3	Tottenham Hotspur	42	21	8	13	68	43	+25	71	Disqualified from the UEFA Cup
4	Arsenal (Note: Arsenal would have qualified as League Cup winners.)	42	20	10	12	58	35	+23	70	Disqualified from the UEFA Cup
5	Norwich City	42	17	17	8	53	51	+2	68	
6	Wimbledon	42	19	9	14	57	50	+7	66	

Source: World Football
Rules for classification: 1) Points; 2) Goal difference; 3) Goals scored
Notes:

23 August 1986 1	Arsenal	1–0	Manchester United	London
	Nicholas			Stadium: Highbury; Attendance: 41,382

26 August 1986 2	Coventry City	2–1	Arsenal	Coventry
			Anderson	Stadium: Highfield Road; Attendance: 11,182

30 August 1986 3	Liverpool	2–1	Arsenal	Liverpool
	Mølby 19' (pen.); Rush 57'		Adams	Stadium: Anfield; Attendance: 38,637

2 September 1986 4	Arsenal	2–0	Sheffield Wednesday	London
	Quinn; Adams			Stadium: Highbury; Attendance: 20,101

6 September 1986 5	Arsenal	0–0	Tottenham Hotspur	London
				Stadium: Highbury; Attendance: 44,707

13 September 1986 6	Luton Town	0–0	Arsenal	Luton
				Stadium: Kenilworth Road; Attendance: 9,876

20 September 1986 7	Arsenal	0–0	Oxford United	London
				Stadium: Highbury; Attendance: 20,676

27 September 1986 8	Nottingham Forest	1–0	Arsenal	Nottingham
				Stadium: City Ground

4 October 1986 9	Everton	0–1	Arsenal	Liverpool
			Williams	Stadium: Goodison Park; Attendance: 30,007

11 October 1986 10	Arsenal	3–1	Watford	London
	Groves; Hayes pen.' Quinn			Stadium: Highbury; Attendance: 24,076

18 October 1986 11	Newcastle United	1–2	Arsenal	Newcastle-upon-Tyne
			Anderson; Williams	Stadium: St. James' Park; Attendance: 22,368

25 October 1986 12	Arsenal	3–1	Chelsea	London
	Hayes pen.' Rocastle			Stadium: Highbury; Attendance: 32,990

1 November 1986 13	Charlton Athletic	0–2	Arsenal	London
			Adams; Hayes	Stadium: Selhurst Park

8 November 1986 14	Arsenal	0–0	West Ham United	London
				Stadium: Highbury; Attendance: 36,084

15 November 1986 15	Southampton	0–4	Arsenal	Southampton
			Hayes pen.' Anderson; Quinn; Groves	Stadium: The Dell; Attendance: 18,728

22 November 1986 16	Arsenal	3–0	Manchester City	London
	Quinn; Anderson; Adams			Stadium: Highbury; Attendance: 29,009

29 November 1986 17	Aston Villa	0–4	Arsenal	Birmingham
			Hayes; Groves; Rocastle own goal	Stadium: Villa Park; Attendance: 21,658

6 December 1986 18	Arsenal	3–1	Queens Park Rangers	London
	Hayes; Quinn			Stadium: Highbury; Attendance: 34,049

13 December 1986 19	Norwich City	1–1	Arsenal	Norwich
			Hayes pen.'	Stadium: Carrow Road; Attendance: 21,409

20 December 1986 20	Arsenal	3–0	Luton Town	London
	Quinn; Adams; Hayes			Stadium: Highbury; Attendance: 28,217

26 December 1986 21	Leicester City	1–1	Arsenal	Leicester
			Hayes pen.'	Stadium: Filbert Street; Attendance: 19,205

27 December 1986 22	Arsenal	1–0	Southampton	London
	Quinn			Stadium: Highbury; Attendance: 38,118

1 January 1987 23	Arsenal	3–1	Wimbledon	London
	Nicholas; Hayes pen.'			Stadium: Highbury; Attendance: 36,144

4 January 1987 24	Tottenham Hotspur	1–2	Arsenal	London
			Adams; Davis	Stadium: White Hart Lane; Attendance: 37,723

18 January 1987 25	Arsenal	0–0	Coventry City	London
				Stadium: Highbury; Attendance: 17,561

24 January 1987 26	Manchester United	2–0	Arsenal	Manchester
				Stadium: Old Trafford; Attendance: 51,367

14 February 1987 27	Sheffield Wednesday	1–1	Arsenal	Sheffield
			Quinn	Stadium: Hillsborough; Attendance: 24,792

25 February 1987 28	Oxford United	0–0	Arsenal	Oxford
				Stadium: Manor Ground; Attendance: 13,296

7 March 1987 29	Chelsea	1–0	Arsenal	London
				Stadium: Stamford Bridge; Attendance: 29,301

10 March 1987 30	Arsenal	0–1	Liverpool	London
			Rush 20'	Stadium: Highbury; Attendance: 47,777

17 March 1987 31	Arsenal	0–0	Nottingham Forest	London
				Stadium: Highbury; Attendance: 18,352

21 March 1987 32	Watford	2–0	Arsenal	Watford
				Stadium: Vicarage Road; Attendance: 18,172

28 March 1987 33	Arsenal	0–1	Everton	London
				Stadium: Highbury; Attendance: 36,218

8 April 1987 34	West Ham United	3–1	Arsenal	London
			Hayes pen.'	Stadium: Boleyn Ground; Attendance: 26,174

11 April 1987 35	Arsenal	2–1	Charlton Athletic	London
	Davis; Hayes			Stadium: Highbury; Attendance: 26,111

14 April 1987 36	Arsenal	0–1	Newcastle United	London
				Stadium: Highbury; Attendance: 17,353

18 April 1987 37	Wimbledon	1–2	Arsenal	London
			Merson; Davis	Stadium: Plough Lane; Attendance: 8,515

20 April 1987 38	Arsenal	4–1	Leicester City	London
	Hayes pen.' Davis; Nicholas			Stadium: Highbury; Attendance: 18,767

25 April 1987 39	Manchester City	3–0	Arsenal	Manchester
				Stadium: Maine Road; Attendance: 18,072

2 May 1987 40	Arsenal	2–1	Aston Villa	London
	Hayes pen.'			Stadium: Highbury; Attendance: 18,463

4 May 1987 41	Queens Park Rangers	1–4	Arsenal	London
			Rix; Merson; Davis	Stadium: Loftus Road; Attendance: 13,387

9 May 1987 42	Arsenal	1–2	Norwich City	London
	Merson			Stadium: Highbury; Attendance: 24,001

=== Football League Cup ===
23 September 1986 Second round (1st Leg)	Arsenal	2–0	Huddersfield Town	London
	Davis; Quinn			Stadium: Highbury

7 October 1986 Second round (2nd Leg)	Huddersfield Town	1–1 (1–3 agg.)	Arsenal	Huddersfield
			Hayes	Stadium: Leeds Road

28 October 1986 Third round	Arsenal	3–1	Manchester City	London
	Rocastle; Hayes (p); Davis			Stadium: Highbury

18 November 1986 Fourth round	Arsenal	2–0	Charlton Athletic	London
	Quinn own goal			Stadium: Highbury

21 January 1987 Quarter-Final	Arsenal	2–0	Nottingham Forest	London
	Nicholas; Hayes			Stadium: Highbury

8 February 1987 Semi-Final (1st Leg)	Arsenal	0–1	Tottenham Hotspur	London
			C. Allen 39'	Stadium: Highbury

1 March 1987 Semi-Final (2nd Leg)	Tottenham Hotspur	1–2 (aet) (2–2 agg.)	Arsenal	London
	C. Allen 16'		Anderson 51'; Quinn 65'	Stadium: White Hart Lane, Tottenham

4 March 1987 Semi-Final (replay)	Tottenham Hotspur	1–2	Arsenal	London
	C. Allen 62'		Allinson 82'; Rocastle 90'	Stadium: White Hart Lane, Tottenham

5 April 1987 Final	Arsenal	2–1	Liverpool	London
	Nicholas 30', 83'		Rush 23'	Stadium: Wembley Stadium; Attendance: 96,000

=== FA Cup ===
Arsenal entered the FA Cup in the third round proper, in which they were drawn to face Reading.

10 January 1987 Third round	Reading	1–3	Arsenal	Reading
	Senior 22'		Nicholas 20', 52'; Hayes 36' (pen.)	Stadium: Elm Park

31 January 1987 Fourth round	Arsenal	6–1	Plymouth Argyle	London
	Nicholas; Anderson (2); Davis; Quinn; Rocastle		D. Rowbotham	Stadium: Highbury

21 February 1987 Fifth round	Arsenal	2–0	Barnsley	London
	Hayes (pen); Nicholas			Stadium: Highbury

14 March 1987 Sixth round	Arsenal	1–3	Watford	London
	Allinson 12'		Blissett 23', 88'; Barnes 52'	Stadium: Highbury

== Top scorers ==
=== First Division ===
- (England) Martin Hayes 19 (8 penalties)
- (Republic of Ireland) Niall Quinn 8
- (England) Tony Adams 6
- (England) Viv Anderson 4
- (Scotland) Charlie Nicholas 4
- (England) Paul Davis 4
