= 1989–90 Arsenal F.C. season =

English football club season

Arsenal
1989–90 season
- Chairman: Peter Hill-Wood
- Manager: George Graham
- Stadium: Highbury
- First Division: 4th
- FA Cup: Fourth round
- League Cup: Fourth round
- Top goalscorer: League: Alan Smith (10); All: Alan Smith (13)
- Highest home attendance: 43,483 vs. Queens Park Rangers (27 January 1990)
- Lowest home attendance: 26,865 vs. Southampton (2 May 1990)
Home colours	Away colours

The 1989–90 season was Arsenal Football Club's 64th consecutive season in the top flight of English football. After winning the title the previous season, Arsenal finished fourth in 1989–90, behind champions Liverpool, runners-up Aston Villa and third-placed Tottenham Hotspur in the title challenge.

== Season summary ==
Arsenal's campaign to retain the Championship in 1989–90 began well once they recovered from a 4–1 drubbing by Manchester United on the opening day, and in November they were on top. But the signs were not good; few of their victories were comfortable. The 4–3 home victory over Norwich on the first Saturday of November was particularly uncomfortable. The game marked David O'Learys 622nd major match for Arsenal, a club record, and it was an eventful occasion. O'Leary scored an equaliser as Arsenal recovered from 3–1 down and was also shown the yellow card. Then a last-minute penalty which gave Arsenal victory sparked a fracas involving 19 players. Three weeks later the FA Disciplinary Committee fined Norwich £50.000 and Arsenal £20.000. It was the first time clubs had been responsible for their players in such an incident. Arsenal's wheels wobbled in the fourth round of the Littlewoods Cup in November. After a two-leg, 8–1 victory over Plymouth and a 1–0 victory over Liverpool at Highbury, a visit to Second Division Oldham did not seem so awesome. Yet they were beaten 3–1 and, from Christmas onwards, their season fell apart. Five out of six successive away games were lost, with only one goal scored. Niall Quinn scored the winning goal against Stoke City in the FA-cup third round on 6 January 1990, which was to be his last game for Arsenal. After only 6 appearances in the League, Quinn left to join Manchester City for £700,000 in March 1990.

FA-cup defeat at Queens Park Rangers followed, David Rocastle and Michael Thomas suffered dramatic losses in form and the goals dried up for Alan Smith, only 10 compared to 23 the previous season. On the other hand, the introduction of Kevin Campbell was an exiting indication of the future.

As Arsenal had seen before, winning the championship and retaining it were different propositions. A final position of fourth was no disgrace, but it was 17 points behind Liverpool F.C.

Adams, Rocastle and Smith were all in Bobby Robson's preliminary squad to World Cup 1990. Adams was axed in preference to Mark Wright, Rocastle was excluded although he had played in five of England's six World Cup qualifying matches. Smith was omitted in favour of Steve Bull. The only Arsenal player to make an appearance in the World Cup 1990 was David O'Leary who scored the last decisive penalty that took Ireland to the quarter finals.

== Results ==
=== FA Charity Shield ===
As league champions, Arsenal contested the 1989 FA Charity Shield against Liverpool, who beat their local rivals Everton to win the 1989 FA Cup Final. Liverpool won the match on 12 August 1989 by 1–0 with a goal from Peter Beardsley.

12 August 1989 FA Charity Shield	Liverpool	1–0	Arsenal	London
	Beardsley 32'			Stadium: Wembley Stadium; Attendance: 63,149; Referee: Allan Gunn (Sussex)

=== First Division ===
Pos	Team	Pld	W	D	L	GF	GA	GD	Pts	Qualification or relegation
2	Aston Villa	38	21	7	10	57	38	+19	70	Qualification for the UEFA Cup first round
3	Tottenham Hotspur	38	19	6	13	59	47	+12	63	
4	Arsenal	38	18	8	12	54	38	+16	62	
5	Chelsea	38	16	12	10	58	50	+8	60	
6	Everton	38	17	8	13	57	46	+11	59	

Source: World Football
Rules for classification: 1) Points; 2) Goal difference; 3) Goals scored

19 August 1989 1	Manchester United	4–1	Arsenal	Manchester
	Bruce 2'; Hughes 63'; Webb 79'; McClair 83'		Rocastle 22'	Stadium: Old Trafford; Referee: David Hutchinson

22 August 1989 2	Arsenal	2–0	Coventry City	London
	Marwood 50'; Thomas 84'			Stadium: Highbury

26 August 1989 3	Arsenal	0–0	Wimbledon	London
				Stadium: Highbury

9 September 1989 4	Arsenal	5–0	Sheffield Wednesday	London
	Merson; Adams; Marwood; Thomas; Smith			Stadium: Highbury

16 September 1989 5	Nottingham Forest	1–2	Arsenal	Nottingham
	Parker		Merson; Marwood	Stadium: City Ground

23 September 1989 6	Arsenal	1–0	Charlton Athletic	London
	Marwood (pen)			Stadium: Highbury

30 September 1989 7	Chelsea	0–0	Arsenal	London
				Stadium: Stamford Bridge

14 October 1989 8	Arsenal	4–0	Manchester City	London
	Groves (2); Thomas; Merson			Stadium: Highbury

18 October 1989 9	Tottenham Hotspur	2–1	Arsenal	London
	Samways; Walsh		Michael Thomas	Stadium: White Hart Lane

21 October 1989 10	Everton	3–0	Arsenal	Liverpool
	Nevin 39', 82'; McDonald 78'			Stadium: Goodison Park

28 October 1989 11	Arsenal	1–1	Derby County	London
	Smith		Goddard	Stadium: Highbury

4 November 1989 12	Arsenal	4–3	Norwich City	London
	Quinn 55'; Dixon 60' (pen.), 90'; O'Leary 78'		Allen 19'; Phillips 30'; Sherwood 76'	Stadium: Highbury

11 November 1989 13	Millwall	1–2	Arsenal	London
	Sheringham		Thomas; Quinn	Stadium: The Den

18 November 1989 14	Arsenal	3–0	Queen's Park Rangers	London
	Smith; Dixon (pen); Jónsson			Stadium: Highbury

26 November 1989 15	Liverpool	2–1	Arsenal	Liverpool
	McMahon 30'; Barnes 65'		Smith 79'	Stadium: Anfield

3 December 1989 16	Arsenal	1–0	Manchester United	London
	Groves 15'			Stadium: Highbury

9 December 1989 17	Coventry City	0–1	Arsenal	Coventry
			Merson	Stadium: Highfield Road

16 December 1989 18	Arsenal	3–2	Luton Town	London
	Smith; Merson; Marwood		Elstrup (2,1 pen)	Stadium: Highbury

26 December 1989 19	Southampton	1–0	Arsenal	Southampton
	Rod Wallace			Stadium: The Dell

30 December 1989 20	Aston Villa	2–1	Arsenal	Birmingham
	Platt; Mountfield		Adams	Stadium: Villa Park

1 January 1990 21	Arsenal	4–1	Crystal Palace	London
	Smith (2); Dixon; Adams		Pardew	Stadium: Highbury

13 January 1990 22	Wimbledon	1–0	Arsenal	London
	Bennett			Stadium: Plough Lane

20 January 1990 23	Arsenal	1–0	Tottenham Hotspur	London
	Adams 64'			Stadium: Highbury

17 February 1990 24	Sheffield Wednesday	1–0	Arsenal	Sheffield
	Bould (o.g.)			Stadium: Hillsborough Stadium

27 February 1990 25	Charlton Athletic	0–0	Arsenal	London
				Stadium: Selhurst Park

3 March 1990 26	Queen's Park Rangers	2–0	Arsenal	London
	Wilkins; Wegerle			Stadium: Loftus Road

7 March 1990 27	Arsenal	3–0	Nottingham Forest	London
	Groves; Adams; Campbell			Stadium: Highbury

10 March 1990 28	Manchester City	1–1	Arsenal	Manchester
	White		Marwood	Stadium: Maine Road

17 March 1990 29	Arsenal	0–1	Chelsea	London
			Bumstead 63'	Stadium: Highbury

24 March 1990 30	Derby County	1–3	Arsenal	Derby
	Briscoe		Hayes (2); Campbell	Stadium: Baseball Ground

31 March 1990 31	Arsenal	1–0	Everton	London
	Smith 21'			Stadium: Highbury

11 April 1990 32	Arsenal	0–1	Aston Villa	London
			Price 85'	Stadium: Highbury

14 April 1990 33	Crystal Palace	1–1	Arsenal	London
	Gray		Hayes	Stadium: Selhurst Park

18 April 1990 34	Arsenal	1–1	Liverpool	London
	Merson 40'		Barnes 86'	Stadium: Highbury

21 April 1990 35	Luton Town	2–0	Arsenal	Luton
	Dowie; Black			Stadium: Kenilworth Road

28 April 1990 36	Arsenal	2–0	Millwall	London
	Davis; Merson			Stadium: Highbury

2 May 1990 37	Arsenal	2–1	Southampton	London
	Dixon (pen); Rocastle		Horne	Stadium: Highbury; Attendance: 26,685

5 May 1990 38	Norwich City	2–2	Arsenal	Norwich
	Bowen 13'; Fox 45'		Smith 44', 77'	Stadium: Carrow Road

=== Football League Cup ===
19 September 1989 Second round (1st Leg)	Arsenal	2–0	Plymouth Argyle	London
	Smith, o.g.			Stadium: Highbury; Attendance: 26,865

3 October 1989 Second round (2nd Leg)	Plymouth Argyle	1–6 (1–8 agg.)	Arsenal	Plymouth
			Thomas (3), Groves, Smith, o.g.	Stadium: Home Park; Attendance: 17,360

25 October 1989 Third round	Arsenal	1–0	Liverpool	London
	Smith 80'			Stadium: Highbury; Attendance: 40,814

22 November 1989 Fourth round	Oldham Athletic	3–1	Arsenal	Oldham
	Ritchie (2); Henry		Quinn 90'	Stadium: Boundary Park; Attendance: 14,924

=== FA Cup ===
Arsenal entered the FA Cup in the third round proper, in which they were drawn to face Stoke City.

6 January 1990 Third round	Stoke City	0–1	Arsenal	Stoke on Trent
			Quinn	Stadium: Victoria Ground; Attendance: 23,827

27 January 1990 Fourth round	Arsenal	0–0	Queen's Park Rangers	London
				Stadium: Highbury; Attendance: 43,483

31 January 1990 Fourth round replay	Queen's Park Rangers	2–0	Arsenal	London
	Sansom, Sinton			Stadium: Loftus Road; Attendance: 21,547

== Squad ==
Note: Flags indicate national team as defined under FIFA eligibility rules; some limited exceptions apply. Players may hold more than one non-FIFA nationality.

Pos.	Nation	Player
GK	ENG	John Lukic
DF	ENG	Lee Dixon
DF	ENG	Nigel Winterburn
MF	ENG	Michael Thomas
DF	ENG	Tony Adams (captain)
DF	IRL	David O'Leary
MF	ENG	David Rocastle
MF	ENG	Kevin Richardson
FW	ENG	Paul Merson
FW	ENG	Alan Smith
MF	ENG	Brian Marwood

Pos.	Nation	Player
MF	ENG	Perry Groves
DF	ENG	Steve Bould
FW	ENG	Kevin Campbell
MF	ENG	Paul Davis
MF	ENG	Martin Hayes
DF	ENG	Gus Caesar
FW	IRL	Niall Quinn
MF	ISL	Sigurdur Jonsson
DF	ENG	Colin Pates
MF	ENG	Kwame Ampadu

== Top scorers ==
=== First Division ===
- (England) Alan Smith 10
- (England) Paul Merson 7
- (England) Brian Marwood 6
- (England) Michael Thomas 5
- (England) Tony Adams 5
- (England) Lee Dixon 5

== See also ==
- 1989–90 in English football
- List of Arsenal F.C. seasons
