= Paul Davis (footballer, born 1961) =

English footballer (born 1961)

Personal information
- Full name: Paul Vincent Davis
- Date of birth: 9 December 1961 (age 64)
- Place of birth: Dulwich, England
- Height: 1.78 m (5 ft 10 in)
- Position: Midfielder

Senior career*
Years	Team	Apps	(Gls)
1980–1995	Arsenal	447	(30)
1990	→ IFK Eskilstuna (loan)	7	(1)
1995	Stabæk (loan)	1	(0)
1995–1996	Brentford	5	(0)
Total		482	(30)

International career
1982–1988	England U21	11	(2)
1991	Football League XI	1	(0)
1991	England B	1	(1)
- * Club domestic league appearances and goals

Paul Vincent Davis (born 9 December 1961) is an English former professional footballer who played as a midfielder. Davis was an integral part of the successful Arsenal side of the late 1980s, and early 1990s, winning the League Cup in 1987 and the First Division in 1989 and 1991. He also won the Cup-Double in 1993 and the Cup-Winners Cup 1994. Davis played 447 senior games for Arsenal, scoring 30 goals in the League and seven goals in the cups.

== Playing career ==
=== Arsenal ===
==== 1980–86: Debut and First-team regular ====
Born in Dulwich, London, but later raised in Bermondsey and Stockwell, Davis came to Arsenal as an associated schoolboy in October 1977 whilst playing for South London Schoolboys and on leaving school he became an apprentice in June 1978, turning professional a year later. A talented left-footed midfielder, he made his debut 7 April 1980 in a North London derby, a 2–1 victory against Tottenham Hotspur at White Hart Lane. The following season Paul started nine league games and scored his first goal for Arsenal in a 3–2 win at Highbury against Crystal Palace. In the early days he had to battle for a midfield place against Liam Brady, Graham Rix, Brian Talbot and John Hollins. The season after that, 1981–82, Davis became a regular in the First team, missing only four League games as well as winning his first of his eleven England U21 caps.

Davis developed a more physical style of play while retaining his technical ability in midfield. During the following two seasons, he became a regular on the right side of the midfield. In the early part of the 1985-86 season, he formed a midfield partnership with Stewart Robson, although his progress was interrupted by a groin injury that sidelined him for three months.

==== 1986–88: George Graham arrives ====
By the time George Graham arrived at Highbury in the summer of 1986, Davis was important to Arsenal but without a major winners' medal. Davis known for his pass accuracy and calmness, and for being a multi-purpose midfielder. In George Graham's first season in charge, 1986–87, Davis had a good campaign, partnering in the midfield with Steve Williams, including when Arsenal beat Liverpool in the League Cup Final 2–1. After a hernia operation in early 1988 Davis was in the side again in April 1988, bidding to retain the cup, but lost 3–2 to Luton Town in the Final.

==== 1988–90: Glenn Cockerill incident, injuries and League champions ====
On 17 September 1988, three days after being an unused substitute for England at Wembley against Denmark, Davis punched Southampton player Glenn Cockerill in the jaw, during a 2–2 draw at Highbury. It seemed inevitable that Davis would be sent off for such an indiscretion. However, none of the matchday officials saw the incident. Cockerill's jaw was broken and following the FA's analysis of TV footage Davis was given a then unprecedented nine-match ban and £3,000 fine. In fact in his previous nine seasons he had only been booked 14 times. Davis was subsequently removed from the England squad and lost the opportunity to represent his country. Davis played enough games to guarantee he would receive a championship medal, 12 league games and scoring once in the 1988–89 title winning season. In January 1989 he went with Arsenal to play two matches in Bermuda and suffered a bad thigh injury that plagued him so he missed the climax of the season at Anfield. In August 1989 he needed a hernia operation to cure a persistent groin problem.

Davis remained largely on the outside looking in throughout 1989–90, not appearing at all until Boxing Day, against Southampton as a substitute. Davis had started in just 5 matches in his new year comeback, even as a Nigel Winterburn replacement as a left back against Stoke City in the third round FA Cup tie, before a hamstring injury forced him out of contention for six weeks. A combination of the drive of Michael Thomas and the consistency of Kevin Richardson left him frustrated on the sidelines. Within this, Davis' relationship with Graham became strained. Yet, when the injuries began to mount up, toward the end of an unsuccessful defence of their title, Graham once again turned to Davis and it was within these last five games of the campaign that the subtleties he could offer attained a renewed value to the Gunners.

==== 1990–91: Ten years at Arsenal and a title triumph ====
However, after a spell on loan with Swedish club IFK Eskilstuna, six weeks in June and July 1990, he returned to play a regular role in the 1990–91 title triumph.

Along with the signings of David Seaman and Anders Limpar, it was the rejuvenation of Davis during the 1990–91 season that led to Arsenal reclaiming the First Division title, absorbing only one defeat along the way. Davis missed only one League game of the season and won Football League XI recognition. Davis together with Thomas were a seamless blend. They could both hound and harry opposing threats, but their link-up play was where they excelled. When under pressure, a pass from Davis boot could ping the ball 60 yards and, with the aerial prowess of Alan Smith waiting to receive, it meant Davis's long range passing was often used. Davis was also captain in Tony Adams absence. After ten years at Arsenal, Davis was honoured with a testimonial match at Highbury against Celtic on 30 July 1991.

==== 1991–92: A year on the sidelines ====
After starting the 1991–92 season in the same form as he ended 1990–91, Davis again succumbed to an injury, which kept him out of the Arsenal side. With him went Arsenal's league consistency, as did his renewed claims to a place in the national team, having performed well while on duty for England B, on 5 February 1991 against Wales. Although selected for the England senior squad on several occasions, he never made an appearance for the senior team, despite 12-appearances for the Under-21 team, where he captained the side.

Arsenal were knocked out by Benfica on 6 November 1991 in the European Cup. Afterwards Davis was fined and dumped from Graham's first-team plans, when he was criticising the manager's tactics. Asked to play more of a harrying, chasing game, he and Graham fell out. Davis recalled: "I had been asked to chase and track back more by George, particularly in the Benfica game. I didn't think it was my strength, I told him that. So we argued about it and I was dropped". Davis was replaced by David Hillier. Over the next sixteen months, Davis appeared just twice in the first team, the last at Loftus Road on 18 January 1992. Graham made him train with the youth team, and Davis went to see Graham, thinking that he might as well leave if he was not going to play. But Graham thought differently, making it clear that Davis was not going anywhere. Davis also missed the summer pre-season training because of a calf muscle strain in his right leg. He's also suffered problems with superficial veins. While he was recovering from the calf strain, he had an operation to remove the veins.

==== 1993–95: Comeback with Cup success and final seasons at Arsenal ====
When Davis finally returned and fought his way back into the team, he stepped up for his first league game in fourteen months against Norwich on 3 March 1993. Davis started in five more games in the league and returned just in time to lend a calming hand to the Arsenal side for both the 1993 League Cup Final and that year's FA Cup Final, defeating Sheffield Wednesday on both occasions. Ian Wright joked that Davis was saving himself for the cup finals. The latter success completed Davis' full complement of major domestic winners medals. In July 1993 the 31-year old midfielder agreed a new two-year contract.

Davis had forced his way back into the team starting 21 league games in 1993-94. He also played in all nine games in the Cup Winners Cup. Davis achieved a European honour as Arsenal defeated a star-studded Parma side in the 1994 Cup Winners' Cup final.

The signing of Stefan Schwarz in the summer of 1994 took Arsenal in a new direction and after only six appearances in 1994–95, some 15 years beyond his debut in that north London derby, he was released from the club on a free transfer in the wake of the arrival of Bruce Rioch as manager. Davis played his last game for the club on 3 December 1994 away at Nottingham Forest where he scored in a 2–2 draw.

After spending 16 seasons at Arsenal Davis was released on a free transfer in the summer of 1995.

=== Later career ===
Davis briefly joined Norwegian side Stabæk on a two-month pre-season loan deal, in an attempt to regain his fitness for the start of the 1995/96 season.

After his spell at Stabæk, appearing in one game as a substitute, he returned to London to sign for Brentford on a free transfer in September 1995, making five appearances. Davis made his last ever appearance in the Football League for Brentford in a 2–0 defeat at home to Shrewsbury on 4 November 1995.

== Coaching career ==
Davis returned to Arsenal to become a youth coach in 1996 but left the club in 2003 after several times being overlooked for promotion an issue he felt was related to skin color. In September 2003 Davis joined PFA, The Professional Footballers' Association coaching department to be a senior educator. On 27 October 2005, Davis was invited to become assistant manager of Kettering Town by new manager Paul Gascoigne, he left Kettering at the same time as Gascoigne's departure from the club on 5 December 2005, despite being asked to stay on, but he chose to return to the PFA where he worked in coach education and equality until February 2016. As of July 2008, he was working as the PFA's Regional Coach South East.

In March 2016, Davis joined the FA where he continues to work with the elite coach development team. Davis has studied and gained the FA and Pro UEFA Coaching awards, the highest coaching award in the U.K. along with his UEFA 'A' Licence and the FA Diploma in Football Management from Warwick University, as well as his coach educators awards. Davis is now a senior coach/coach educator for the organisation and he is also an ambassador for the 'Kick It Out' and 'Show Racism the Red Card organisations'.

On 26 August 2021, Davis was confirmed as an assistant coach for the England U17s working with Tom Curtis and Omer Riza.

== Honours ==
Arsenal

- Football League First Division: 1988–89, 1990–91
- FA Cup: 1992–93
- Football League Cup: 1986–87, 1992–93; runner-up: 1987–88
- FA Charity Shield: 1991 (shared)
- Football League Centenary Trophy: 1988
- European Cup Winners' Cup: 1993–94
