= Liverpool 0–2 Arsenal (1989) =

English football match

Liverpool vs Arsenal
- The match programme cover, featuring Liverpool's 1989 FA Cup Final win against local rivals Everton.
- Event: 1988–89 Football League First Division
Liverpool	Arsenal
0	2
- Date: 26 May 1989
- Venue: Anfield, Liverpool
- Referee: David Hutchinson (Oxfordshire)
- Attendance: 41,718
- Weather: Warm

The final match of the 1988–89 Football League season was contested at Anfield between Liverpool and Arsenal, respectively the first and second-placed teams in the First Division, on 26 May 1989. The clubs were close enough on points for the match to act as a decider for the championship. However, Arsenal had to win by at least two goals to overtake Liverpool in the table; anything else would result in Liverpool becoming champions. Arsenal won 2–0; midfielder Michael Thomas scored the second goal in the final seconds of the match, ending Arsenal's 18-year wait to be crowned champions.

The two clubs had been due to meet a month earlier, but the stadium disaster at Hillsborough during Liverpool's FA Cup semifinal against Nottingham Forest, which killed 97 Liverpool supporters, meant the fixture was postponed out of respect. It was moved to 26 May, six days after the FA Cup Final – which Liverpool won over crosstown rivals Everton. Arsenal manager George Graham adjusted his usual formation to a defensive one to stop Liverpool's attacking threat; David O'Leary was employed as a sweeper in a back five.

A peak British television audience of over 12 million on ITV saw a first half of few chances as Arsenal successfully nullified Liverpool. Striker Alan Smith scored from a header as play resumed in the second half, but as the game drew to a close with the score 1–0, Arsenal needed a second goal to win the title. In stoppage time, Arsenal's Thomas made a run through the Liverpool midfield. He scored a last-minute goal, in the process denying Liverpool the chance of a second League and Cup double.

The match is considered to be one of the most dramatic conclusions to a league season in the history of the English game and is sometimes seen as the starting point of a renaissance in English football. The ban on English clubs playing in European football was lifted a year later and a new top division – the Premier League – was formed in 1992, which generated more revenue for clubs. The title decider also formed the dramatic climax in the romantic fictional adaptation Fever Pitch (1997) of Nick Hornby's million-selling autobiographical essay Fever Pitch: A Fan's Life.

== Background ==
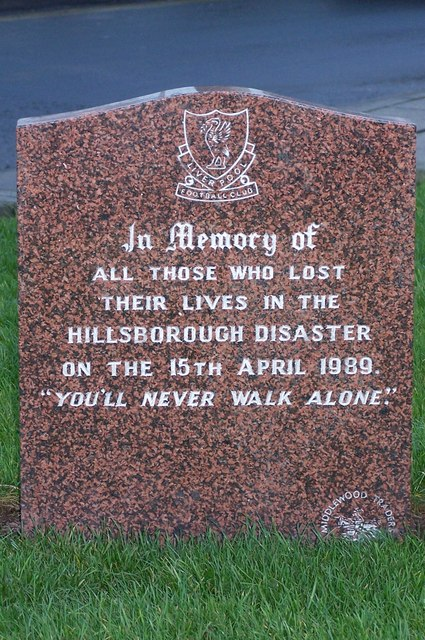
A memorial to the Liverpool supporters who died at Hillsborough. The incident happened a few weeks before the title decider.

The 1988–89 season marked the 100th anniversary of the Football League. A season earlier, the body commemorated its founding by organising an exhibition game between a Football League-select XI, and a World XI (captained by Diego Maradona), followed by a Football Festival in April 1988. The celebrations culminated in October 1988, when Arsenal won a centenary tournament involving seven other First Division clubs. Despite the efforts of the Football League, the events failed to capture the imagination of supporters and the media; The Times football correspondent Stuart Jones described the final tournament as: "the closing debacle of the embarrassing League centenary celebrations."

Football in England had reached its nadir in 1985 as clubs were banned from European competition for five years following the Heysel Stadium disaster. Hooliganism was at its peak and, along with difficult economic times, had contributed to a drop in attendances which did not begin to recover until the 1986-87 season. In the same year, the Kenilworth Road riot – violent scuffles between fans of Millwall and Luton Town – resulted in Prime Minister Margaret Thatcher's government setting up a "war cabinet" to combat football hooliganism. Incidents like these tarnished the sport's reputation, but commercial interest grew. In August 1988, ITV paid £44 million over four seasons to broadcast live First Division matches. The arrangement came about as British Satellite Broadcasting withdrew its joint offer with the BBC, unhappy at how the clubs were run. By November 1988 the government issued a broadcasting shakeup, which aided the growth of multichannel satellite television. ITV's contract therefore acted as a precursor to rising broadcasting deals and growing pressures to keep the top clubs in line.

For much of the 1988–89 season, Arsenal led the First Division table; their manager George Graham had assembled a side mixed with youth and experience, captained by academy graduate Tony Adams. At one stage Arsenal were 11 points clear of defending champions Liverpool, but their lead diminished following a run of bad results. Liverpool had been the dominant English side of the previous 15 years, having won nine league titles and a total of 21 major trophies since 1973. The 1988–89 season had also seen title challenges from surprise contenders including Coventry City and Norwich City.

Liverpool, coached by player-manager Kenny Dalglish, capitalised after an indifferent start to the campaign, and emerged as Arsenal's main challengers for the title. Towards the end of the season Liverpool supporters were involved in a sporting disaster at Hillsborough, where 95 of the club's supporters died as a result of overcrowding and loss of police control during a match against Nottingham Forest on 15 April - a 96th fan died in March 1993 after being in a coma for nearly four years, while a 97th fan who was severely brain damaged died 32 years later. The disaster was the worst of its kind in English sporting history, and led to an inquiry into safety standards of stadiums.

Due to the tragedy, Liverpool's fixture at home to Arsenal on 23 April was postponed; no suitable date was found until after the FA Cup Final, which was traditionally the last match of the English football season. It was eventually rescheduled for 26 May – six days after Liverpool's victory in the FA Cup final, on a Friday evening. By this stage, Liverpool were three points ahead of Arsenal, who needed to win by at least two clear goals to deprive Liverpool of the title and a then unique second double. The league season had ended for the remaining First Division clubs a week before.

== Pre-match ==
The 1988–89 title race was the closest in the history of the First Division. In the run-up to the Anfield match, Arsenal lost to Derby County and drew with Wimbledon; Liverpool won twice, 2–0 against Queens Park Rangers and 5–1 against West Ham United allowing them to overtake Arsenal with one game to play and take a superior goal difference. On the eve of the match, they were three points ahead, with the table looking as follows:

First Division table, 25 May 1989
Pos	Team	Pld	W	D	L	GF	GA	GD	Pts
1	Liverpool	37	22	10	5	65	26	+39	76
2	Arsenal	37	21	10	6	71	36	+35	73

A victory for Arsenal would bring the two teams level on points: victory by a margin of three or more goals would win Arsenal the title on goal difference. Victory by exactly two goals would leave the teams tied on both points and goal difference, but Arsenal would win the title by virtue of having scored more goals. Any other result (i.e. a Liverpool victory, a draw, or an Arsenal win by only one goal) would give the title to Liverpool.

Liverpool had not lost by two or more goals at Anfield in three years, and Arsenal had not won there in fifteen. Furthermore, Liverpool had never previously been defeated when playing forwards John Aldridge and Ian Rush together. The home side were therefore the overwhelming favourites to win the title – the Daily Mirror's sports sections led with the headline "You Haven't Got A Prayer, Arsenal". To defuse the tension, Graham gave his players two days off after their draw with Wimbledon. The mood in training was relaxed and the squad travelled to Liverpool on the day of the match, which surprised several players. During the coach trip, Graham showed his players a video of Arsenal's successful 1970–71 side to inspire and motivate his players.

In the United Kingdom, the game was shown live on The Match, which aired a live Division One game most weeks of the season from 1988 to 1992, across most of ITV's network stations. Elton Welsby presented coverage and his guest was the England manager Bobby Robson. The match commentator was Brian Moore, alongside former Tottenham Hotspur manager David Pleat. On radio, the action was described by Peter Jones and Alan Green on BBC Radio 2.

== Match ==
=== Summary ===
The match took place on a warm spring evening with the kick-off delayed because many Arsenal supporters were caught in traffic congestion. The Arsenal players presented flowers to fans in different parts of the ground in memory of those who had died in the Hillsborough disaster. Liverpool lined up in a traditional 4–4–2 formation: a four-man defence, four midfielders and two centre forwards. Arsenal adopted a 5–4–1 formation with David O'Leary in the unusual role of sweeper. Although Arsenal did not usually play this way, this enabled the full-backs Lee Dixon and Nigel Winterburn more scope to push forward and limit Liverpool's wing play.

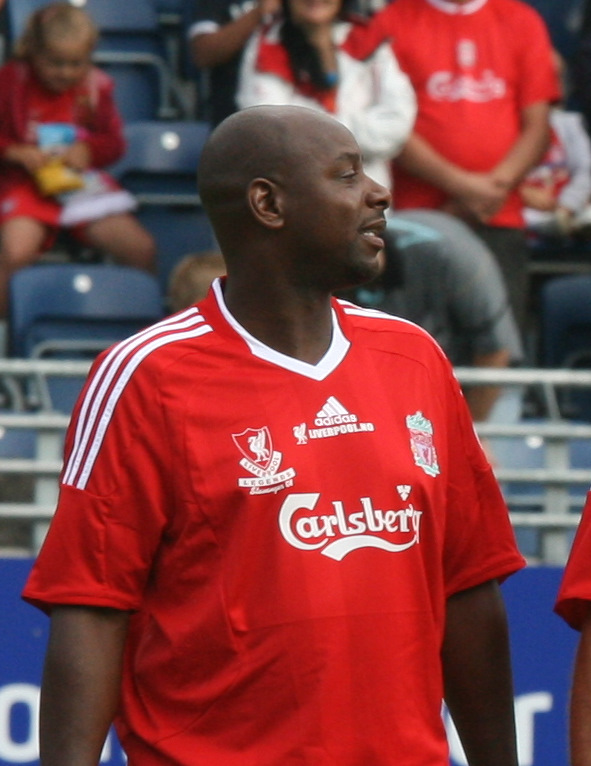
Michael Thomas (here wearing a Liverpool shirt) scored Arsenal's second goal

Arsenal kicked off the match and did their best to restrict Liverpool's passing game in the opening 45 minutes through tackling and quick counter-attacking with the long ball; with the game's flow interrupted and the two teams cancelling each other out, neither side built any momentum in the first half with few clear-cut chances. The first notable action came for Arsenal when a cross from Michael Thomas on the right which was met by Steve Bould, but Steve Nicol cleared it over the bar for a corner. Liverpool responded with a shot from outside the box from Rush after being teed up by Aldridge. However, soon after Rush was forced to go off with a groin strain and had to be replaced by Peter Beardsley in the 32nd minute. The score was 0–0 at half time.

Eight minutes after the restart, Whelan was penalised for an offence on the edge of the Liverpool area. Winterburn took the resulting indirect free kick, from which Alan Smith scored with a header. Liverpool's players protested, claiming Smith had not made contact (and thus the goal should have been disallowed, coming directly from an indirect free kick) or that there had been a push by O'Leary. After consulting his linesman, the referee David Hutchinson awarded the goal. After the match, he recalled none of the Liverpool players knew why they had protested, and TV replays confirm that Smith made contact.

With the score 1–0, Arsenal pushed forward but Liverpool still held the advantage. In the 74th minute an unmarked Thomas latched onto a pass from Richardson near the penalty spot, but shot weakly and it was smothered by Liverpool keeper Bruce Grobbelaar. Arsenal manager George Graham brought on Martin Hayes and Perry Groves, and switched to a more attack-oriented 4–4–2 formation. This gave Liverpool space to counter-attack through John Barnes and Aldridge. Aldridge and Ray Houghton both had late chances to equalise but did not capitalise on them; Houghton sliced a shot from the edge of the box wide, while Aldridge was caught offside meeting a Barnes throughball and scored a disallowed goal after the whistle had gone. As full-time approached the game was heading for a 1–0 scoreline, and thus Liverpool would win the title.

Arsenal come streaming forward now in surely what will be their last attack. A good ball by Dixon, finding Smith, for Thomas charging through the midfield! Thomas, it's up for grabs now! Thomas! Right at the end! An unbelievable climax to the league season. Well into injury-time, the Liverpool players are down absolutely abject. Aldridge is down, Barnes is down, Dalglish just stands there. Nicol's on his knees, McMahon's on his knees. Suddenly, it was Michael Thomas bursting through, the bounce fell his way. He flicks it wide of Grobbelaar, and we have the dramatic finish, maybe in the history of the Football League. The top two challenging on the night, and the title possibly decided in the last minute of the whole season.

— Brian Moore's commentary of Arsenal's winning goal.

As the time went past 90 minutes, an injury to Kevin Richardson held up play. TV cameras showed Liverpool midfielder Steve McMahon telling his teammates there was one minute remaining. The injury itself meant there would, in fact, be two minutes and 39 seconds of injury time played. Liverpool adopted time-wasting tactics, including an unnecessary backpass from McMahon to Grobbelaar. In the second minute of injury time, Arsenal launched their final attack. A Barnes run was intercepted by Richardson, and he passed the ball back to his goalkeeper John Lukic. Lukic bowled the ball out to Dixon, his long ball to Alan Smith was flicked on, finding Michael Thomas charging through the midfield. Thomas evaded a challenge by Nicol and raced into the penalty area, slipping the ball past the advancing Grobbelaar to score Arsenal's second.

Thomas had scored with just one minute and 18 seconds to go including whatever time the referee may have added due to the goal celebration. An actual 38 seconds were played after the ball was kicked off. Liverpool tried one last attack but Thomas managed to intercept and pass the ball back to Lukic. The final whistle confirmed Arsenal as champions, with the two sides inseparable on points and goal difference meaning the visitors won the title by virtue of having scored eight more goals than Liverpool throughout the season. Arsenal received the Championship trophy after the match.

=== Details ===
26 May 1989
20:05 BST

Liverpool	0–2	Arsenal
	Mirror Report	Smith 53'; Thomas 90+1'

Anfield, Liverpool
Attendance: 41,718
Referee: David Hutchinson (Oxfordshire)

Liverpool	Arsenal

GK	1	(Zimbabwe) Bruce Grobbelaar
CB	2	(England) Gary Ablett
RB	4	(Scotland) Steve Nicol
CB	6	(Scotland) Alan Hansen
LB	3	(Republic of Ireland) Steve Staunton
RM	7	(Republic of Ireland) Ray Houghton
CM	5	(Republic of Ireland) Ronnie Whelan (c)
CM	11	(England) Steve McMahon
LM	10	(England) John Barnes
CF	8	(Republic of Ireland) John Aldridge
CF	9	(Wales) Ian Rush	(substituted off) 32'
Substitutes:
DF	14	(England) Barry Venison
FW	12	(England) Peter Beardsley	(substituted on) 32'
Manager:
(Scotland) Kenny Dalglish

GK	1	(England) John Lukic
SW	5	(Republic of Ireland) David O'Leary
RB	2	(England) Lee Dixon
CB	6	(England) Tony Adams (c)
CB	10	(England) Steve Bould	(substituted off) 76'
LB	3	(England) Nigel Winterburn
MF	4	(England) Michael Thomas
MF	7	(England) David Rocastle	Yellow card
MF	8	(England) Kevin Richardson	Yellow card
MF	11	(England) Paul Merson	(substituted off) 73'
CF	9	(England) Alan Smith
Substitutes:
MF	12	(England) Perry Groves	(substituted on) 76'
MF	14	(England) Martin Hayes	(substituted on) 73'
Manager:
(Scotland) George Graham

Assistant referees:
Geoff Banwell (England)
P. Cullen (England)
W. Townson (Reserve)

Match rules

- 90 minutes, no extra time or penalties.
- Three points awarded to winner, none to loser.
- One point awarded to each in the event of a draw.
- Two named substitutes.
- Maximum of two substitutions.

== Post-match ==
Shortly after receiving the trophy, Adams was called over by pitchside reporter Jim Rosenthal for a conversation on the field, explaining his absence from the celebratory team photograph for the press. The Arsenal captain spoke of how his teammates were "really fired up" before the game and was delighted with the effort they put in during the course of the match. Graham was proud of his team's performance, and credited Adams, who "suffered an awful lot of stick which has given football very little dignity." When asked about the result he said, "Nobody outside Highbury expected us to do it, but when you lose belief you might as well get out of football." Dalglish paid tribute to his players and refused to blame the fixture rearrangements for losing out to Arsenal, lamenting "It just wasn't to be."

Stuart Jones in The Times wrote how Thomas's late strike was "...worthy of the occasion, defied belief, logic and all expectation. So did Arsenal's performance as a whole." The Guardian's David Lacey opined that Arsenal were deserved winners, calling the match "a marvellous night for English football" after the events at Hillsborough had overshadowed the sport.

== In popular culture ==
The events of the night formed the pivotal point of the 1997 film Fever Pitch, an adaptation of Nick Hornby's bestselling book of the same name. Hornby disagrees his book was responsible for gentrifying the sport, arguing "the owner of an international media empire" had more of a profound impact.

Moore's goal call for Arsenal's winner ("Thomas, it's up for grabs now!") has become synonymous with English football and is one of the sport's most memorable lines. In 2002, it was selected as one of the top ten commentaries of all time by The Observer, and the phrase It's Up For Grabs Now is used as the title of the Arsenal commemorative DVD of the match. It's Up For Grabs Now is also the title of a podcast, hosted by comedian and Arsenal supporter Alan Davies.

== Legacy ==
Last game of the season. You need two goals away from home. And Arsenal did it. I don't care what people are saying – that's the best ending ever of any league I've ever seen.

— Arsenal record goalscorer Thierry Henry on the 1989 final fixture

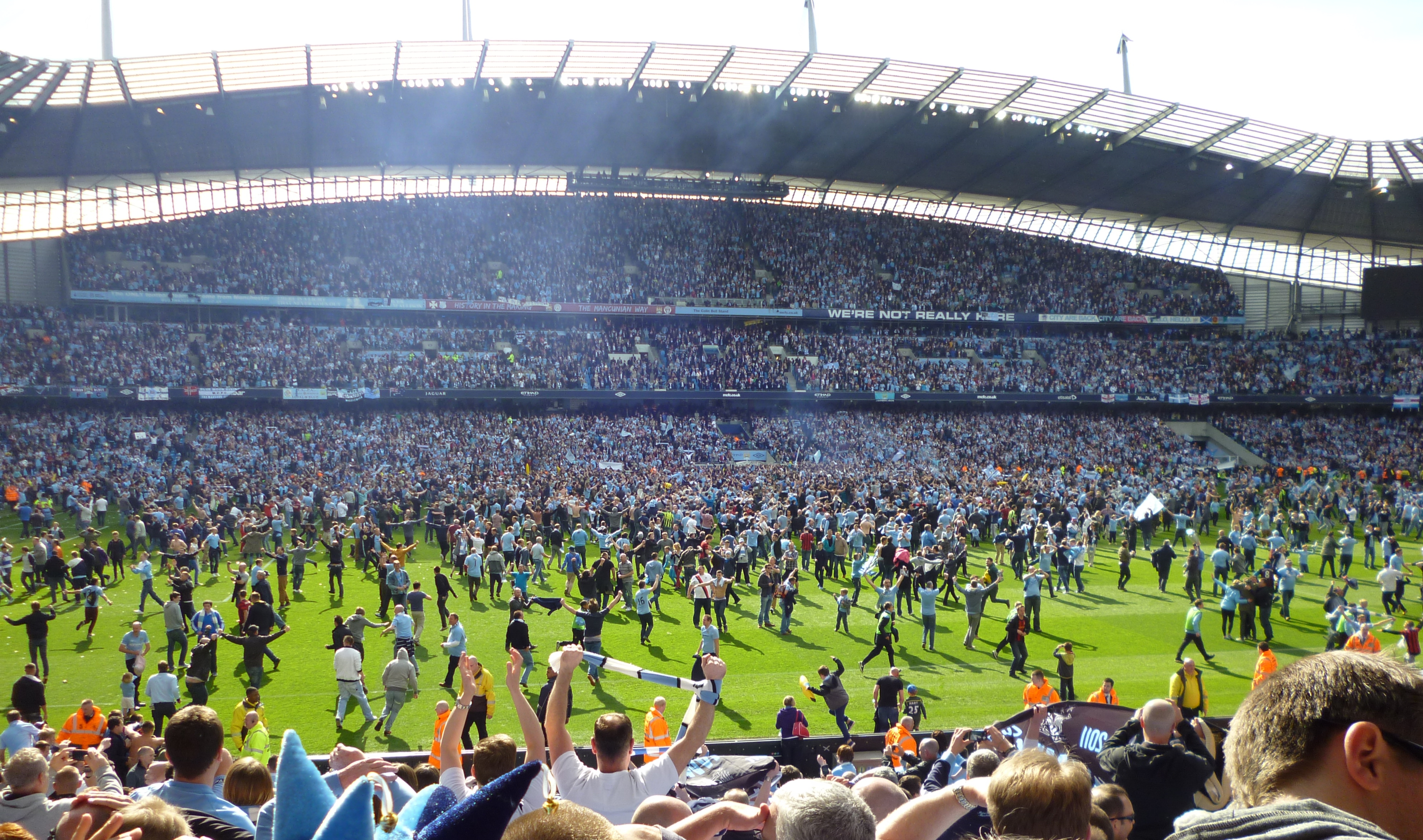
Manchester City's league win of 2011–12 bore comparison to Arsenal's in that the title was decided in the final seconds of the season.

The match has been cited as a pivotal turning point in English football. Author Jason Cowley noted how instead of rioting, Liverpool fans stayed on after the game and applauded Arsenal "as if they understood that we were at the start of something new; that there would be no returning to the ways of old". Cowley noted that "the speed and audacity of a movement that took the Kop's breath away and left Kenny Dalglish standing open-mouthed in disbelief by the Liverpool bench epitomised the healthier qualities of English football as the game approaches the 90s" and "describes the match as "the night football was reborn" and that the event "repaired the reputation of football".

Dominic Fifield suggested Arsenal's win "had shattered the myth that Liverpool were invincible", while Si Hughes in The Daily Telegraph wrote it "...set in motion the decline of one of football's grandest institutions." Although Liverpool regained the championship a year later, the club's dominance waned. In February 1991, Dalglish resigned as Liverpool manager after an FA Cup replay against Merseyside rivals Everton, citing stress as the principal cause. His successor, Graeme Souness, struggled to sustain the club's success with a conservative hierarchy and ageing squad, despite investing in youth players. Liverpool throughout the 1990s and 2000s declined as a league force and it would be 30 years until Liverpool would be crowned top-flight champions since Dalglish's, winning it in 2020.

Arsenal were unable to take part in the European Cup as English clubs were still banned from European competition. Graham's side went on to further successes in the early 1990s, winning the League title again in 1990–91, followed by a domestic cup double and finally the European Cup Winners' Cup. Despite his part in denying them the title, Thomas went on to play for Liverpool in a spell between 1991 and 1998, scoring the opener in their 2–0 victory over Sunderland in the 1992 FA Cup Final.

The title decider at Anfield is not only seen as the starting point of a renaissance in English football, but also the moment where businessmen started to see the untapped commercial potential of live football on television. In the early 1990s discussions were in progress between broadcasters and football chairmen over forming a breakaway league. With the backing of The Football Association, all of the First Division clubs resigned from the Football League to form the Premier League. The new division was created to ensure clubs could capitalise on television money and divide their earnings amongst themselves instead of the lower leagues. After a lengthy bidding process, satellite company BSkyB were awarded exclusive rights for £191m, over five years to show 60 matches per season. This represented an increase of 1,800% on the 1983 deal. In addition to broadcasting, clubs increased their revenue through higher ticket prices; for some like Arsenal, this was to facilitate the phasing out of standing terraces to ensure stadia complied with the Taylor Report.

In 1999, the match was ranked at number 60 in Channel 4's 100 Greatest TV Moments. In 2002, the match was ranked at number 15 in Channel 4's 100 Greatest Sporting Moments, and in 2007 Thomas's goal was voted the second greatest moment in Arsenal's history second only to the 2003–04 "Invincibles" completing an entire Premier League season unbeaten. To commemorate the 20th anniversary of the win, Arsenal's away kit for the 2008–09 season was styled on the same design as that of the 1988–89 season.

Manchester City's comeback to beat Queens Park Rangers 3–2 on 13 May 2012 at the Etihad Stadium on the final day of the 2011–12 Premier League season drew comparisons to the 1989 finish. On this occasion, needing to win after Manchester United beat Sunderland to win the league for the first time since 1967–68, City scored twice in stoppage time to overcome a 2–1 deficit, with Sergio Agüero scoring the winner just 100 seconds from the final whistle.
