= John Lukic =

English footballer (born 1960)

Personal information
- Full name: Jovan Lukic
- Date of birth: 11 December 1960 (age 65)
- Place of birth: Chesterfield, England
- Height: 6 ft 4 in (1.93 m)
- Position: Goalkeeper

Youth career
- Leeds United

Senior career*
Years	Team	Apps	(Gls)
1978–1983	Leeds United	146	(0)
1983–1990	Arsenal	223	(0)
1990–1996	Leeds United	209	(0)
1996–2001	Arsenal	18	(0)
Total		596	(0)

International career
1978–1979	England Youth	9	(0)
1980–1981	England U21	7	(0)
1990	England B	1	(0)
- * Club domestic league appearances and goals

Jovan Lukic (Serbian: Јован "Џон" Лукић, Jovan "Džon" Lukić; born 11 December 1960) is an English football coach and former professional footballer.

He played as a goalkeeper from 1978 to 2001 and spent his entire professional career playing for Leeds United and Arsenal, making 596 league appearances altogether over two spells with each club. He played in the Premier League for both, winning the League Cup and First Division title in his first spell at Highbury, he was part of the double winning Premier League and FA Cup winning squad of 1997–98 season but did not play enough games to win a medal, however he was on the bench for the 1999 Charity Shield victory. His Leeds accolades included another First Division title win in 1992 and the following summer's Charity Shield. He was capped for both the England U21 and England B teams.

== Club career ==
Lukic signed for Leeds United as a schoolboy. He learnt from David Harvey and replaced him, initially in a UEFA Cup Round One, Second Leg, tie against Valletta 3 October 1979, and then in the League at Brighton & Hove Albion on 13 October 1979 and went on to play 165 games for the Elland Road side.

After making a transfer request, Lukic moved to Arsenal in July 1983 for £75,000, as a long-term replacement for Pat Jennings.

In March 1984 Jennings was injured playing against Coventry City at Highfield Road and Lukic came into the side for four games, making his debut on 7 April 1984 against Stoke City at Highbury in a 3–1 win.

The following season, 1984–85, on 31 October 1984, Jennings played poorly against Oxford United away in the League Cup, where Arsenal were beaten 3–2, and Jennings was dropped for one game and Lukic came in to replace him, and though Jennings returned for the next three games, Lukic came back into the side and played every game for the rest of the season, nailing down the number one keepers spot.

In 1985–86 Lukic missed just three games in all competitions and in 1986–87 he clinched his first winners medal and won the League Cup Final against Liverpool.

In 1987–88 Lukic was ever present playing in all 52 matches Arsenal played that season including the return trip to Wembley against Luton Town to defend the League Cup, but Arsenal lost.

However, there were better days to come for Lukic and Arsenal in 1988–89, where Arsenal won the title in the last minute of the game against Liverpool. Lukic played his full part in it as he played every minute of every game that season.

1989–90 was Lukic's last season in his first spell at the club. For the third season in a row he played in every single Arsenal match.

In the summer of 1990 Arsenal manager George Graham signed David Seaman from Queens Park Rangers – Seaman had been Lukic's understudy at Leeds. On his departure, Graham commented "I still think John Lukic is one of the best keepers in the country; I just think David Seaman is the best".

Having played 277 times for the Gunners, Lukic rejoined Leeds. He became their most expensive signing in May 1990, to replace the ageing Mervyn Day, playing a further 265 times. Lukic won a second League title in 1991–92 and a runners up medal in the League Cup in 1995–96 where Leeds lost to Aston Villa at Wembley.

Manager Howard Wilkinson signed Nigel Martyn from Crystal Palace in the summer of 1996 and Lukic rejoined Arsenal on a free-transfer in July 1996. Lukic was granted a Testimonial by Leeds United and his two teams, Leeds United and Arsenal, met at Elland Road on 31 August 1996, in which he played for Arsenal in the first half and Leeds in the second half.

As deputy to David Seaman, he played 15 league games in 1996–97 as cover, but after the signing of Alex Manninger in 1997 he stepped down to No. 3. However, with Manninger injured, Lukic was on the bench for Arsenal's 2000 UEFA Cup final loss to Galatasaray, earning him a runners-up medal.

In 2000, after a series of injuries to the club's other 'keepers, he made a brief return to the first team, playing four times. The last of these four games, against Derby County, was a month shy of his 40th birthday; another one of these, a match against Lazio on 17 October 2000, made him, at the time, the oldest player ever to take part in a UEFA Champions League match. He retired in 2001 and now coaches part-time.

== International career ==
By the 1980s Lukic had attracted the attention of the then Yugoslavia side who approached him about playing for them. He declined to pursue England selection.

Though Lukic played for England at youth and under-21 level, he never won a cap for the senior team. He was twice in the full England squad, but was an unused sub in 1981 friendlies at Wembley against Spain and Brazil. On 11 December 1990 he was called up to the England "B" squad to play Algeria in Algiers and he kept a clean-sheet in a 0–0 draw against the Algerian top team as he came on as a half-time replacement for Nigel Martyn, who was with Crystal Palace at the time. It was to be his last representative appearance.

== Personal life ==
Lukic was born in Chesterfield to Yugoslavian parents; an urban legend states that Lukic's mother survived the Munich air disaster while pregnant with him; this is untrue, as the crash happened in February 1958, more than two years before Lukic was born. There was a Mrs Lukić on board the plane, who did survive (along with her young daughter) after being saved by Manchester United goalkeeper Harry Gregg.

Lukic has a son, also called John and also a goalkeeper, who was a youth player at Nottingham Forest until 2005; he signed professional terms with Grimsby Town in June 2005 to act as understudy to Steve Mildenhall for the 2005–06 season. However, he was released at the end of the season and briefly signed for Barnsley before withdrawing from competitive football.

As of 2011, Lukic worked as a freelance goalkeeping coach.

== Career statistics ==
=== Club ===
Appearances and goals by club, season and competition
Club	Season	League			FA Cup		League Cup		Europe		Other		Total	
Club	Season	Division	Apps	Goals	Apps	Goals	Apps	Goals	Apps	Goals	Apps	Goals	Apps	Goals
Leeds United	1979–80	First Division	33	0	1	0	0	0	3 (Note: Appearances in UEFA Cup)	0	—		37	0
Leeds United	1980–81	First Division	42	0	2	0	2	0	—		—		46	0
Leeds United	1981–82	First Division	42	0	2	0	2	0	—		—		46	0
Leeds United	1982–83	Second Division	29	0	4	0	3	0	—		—		36	0
Leeds United	Total		146	0	9	0	7	0	3	0	—		165	0
Arsenal	1983–84	First Division	4	0	0	0	0	0	—		—		4	0
Arsenal	1984–85	First Division	27	0	3	0	0	0	—		—		30	0
Arsenal	1985–86	First Division	40	0	5	0	6	0	—		—		51	0
Arsenal	1986–87	First Division	36	0	4	0	9	0	—		—		49	0
Arsenal	1987–88	First Division	40	0	4	0	8	0	—		—		52	0
Arsenal	1988–89	First Division	38	0	2	0	5	0	—		—		45	0
Arsenal	1989–90	First Division	38	0	3	0	4	0	—		1 (Note: Appearance in FA Charity Shield)	0	46	0
Arsenal	Total		223	0	21	0	32	0	—		1	0	277	0
Leeds United	1990–91	First Division	38	0	6	0	6	0	—		4 (Note: Appearance(s) in Full Members' Cup)	0	54	0
Leeds United	1991–92	First Division	42	0	1	0	5	0	—		1	0	49	0
Leeds United	1992–93	Premier League	39	0	3	0	3	0	5 (Note: Appearance(s) in UEFA Champions League)	0	1	0	51	0
Leeds United	1993–94	Premier League	20	0	0	0	0	0	—		—		20	0
Leeds United	1994–95	Premier League	42	0	4	0	2	0	—		—		48	0
Leeds United	1995–96	Premier League	28	0	5	0	7	0	4	0	—		44	0
Leeds United	Total		209	0	19	0	23	0	9	0	6	0	266	0
Arsenal	1996–97	Premier League	15	0	1	0	1	0	0	0	—		17	0
Arsenal	1997–98	Premier League	0	0	0	0	0	0	0	0	—		0	0
Arsenal	1998–99	Premier League	0	0	0	0	0	0	0	0	0	0	0	0
Arsenal	1999–2000	Premier League	0	0	0	0	0	0	0	0	0	0	0	0
Arsenal	2000–01	Premier League	3	0	0	0	0	0	1	0	—		4	0
Arsenal	Total		18	0	1	0	1	0	1	0	—		21	0
Career total			596	0	50	0	63	0	13	0	7	0	732	0

== Honours ==
Arsenal

- Football League First Division: 1988–89
- Football League Centenary Trophy: 1988
- Football League Cup: 1986–87; runner-up: 1987–88
- FA Charity Shield: 1999

Leeds United

- Football League First Division: 1991–92
- FA Charity Shield: 1992
- Football League Cup runner-up: 1995–96
