= Graham Rix =

English footballer (born 1957)

Personal information
- Full name: Graham Cyril Rix
- Date of birth: 23 October 1957 (age 68)
- Place of birth: Doncaster, England
- Height: 5 ft 9 in (1.75 m)
- Position: Midfielder

Youth career
- 1974–1975: Arsenal

Senior career*
Years	Team	Apps	(Gls)
1975–1988	Arsenal	351	(41)
1987–1988	→ Brentford (loan)	6	(0)
1988–1991	Caen	89	(9)
1991–1992	Le Havre	12	(0)
1992–1993	Dundee	14	(2)
1995	Chelsea	1	(0)
Total		473	(52)

International career
1977–1980	England U21	7	(0)
1979–1981	England B	2	(0)
1980–1984	England	17	(0)

Managerial career
- 2000: Chelsea (caretaker)
- 2001–2002: Portsmouth
- 2004: Oxford United
- 2005–2006: Heart of Midlothian
- 2012: Central
- 2013–2017: AFC Portchester
- 2022–2024: Fareham Town
- * Club domestic league appearances and goals

Graham Cyril Rix (born 23 October 1957) is an English former professional football player who later became a coach and manager.

Rix played for Arsenal for thirteen years, then Brentford (on loan), Caen, Le Havre, Dundee and Chelsea. He also won 17 caps for England between 1980 and 1984. Rix then managed Chelsea (as caretaker), Portsmouth, Oxford United, Heart of Midlothian, Central, AFC Portchester and Fareham Town.

== Club career ==
=== Arsenal ===
Originally from Doncaster, Yorkshire, Rix joined Arsenal as an apprentice in 1974 and turned professional the year after. He made his debut for the club against Leicester City on 2 April 1977, and marked it by scoring the opening goal. Rix immediately became a regular on the left wing, replacing George Armstrong. Together with Liam Brady, he formed part of an impressive attacking midfield, which helped Arsenal to three successive FA Cup finals between 1978 and 1980. Arsenal only won one of these, in 1979 against Manchester United; the final score was 3–2, with Rix crossing for Alan Sunderland's last-minute winner, just one minute after United had equalised to level the score 2–2.

Arsenal reached the European Cup Winners' Cup final the following season, against Valencia; the match finished 0–0 after extra time – a penalty shoot-out ensued, but Rix missed his penalty and Arsenal lost. He became captain of the club in 1983. Arsenal's form slumped in the early 1980s, though, meaning Rix was unable to claim any silverware as skipper. Arsenal won the 1986–87 League Cup; Rix was not part of the squad for the final against Liverpool but he contributed three appearances en route.

A series of injuries to his achilles tendon kept Rix out of the team in the mid-1980s, and he lost his starting place in the side to Martin Hayes. Rix had a spell on loan at Brentford, before being released in 1988. In all, he played 464 times for the Gunners, scoring 51 goals.

=== After Arsenal ===
After leaving the London club, Rix was the subject of offers from Sheffield Wednesday as well as Queens Park Rangers, but he instead signed for French club Caen, where he would spend three years before transferring to Le Havre, and then played in Scotland for Dundee before announcing his retirement as a player in 1993.

== International career ==
Between 1980 and 1984, Rix played for the England national team, including making five appearances at the 1982 World Cup. He was capped 17 times, but failed to score. His first appearance came on 10 September 1980 in a 4–0 win over Norway, his last in a 1–0 win over Northern Ireland on 4 April 1984.

== Coaching career ==
=== Chelsea ===
Rix joined Chelsea as youth team coach in mid-1993. During an injury crisis, he briefly enlisted as a player for the club, playing a solitary Premier League match in May 1995 against his former club Arsenal. Rix became assistant manager in 1996 under new Blues boss Ruud Gullit, and continued in the same role under Gullit's successor Gianluca Vialli, winning the FA Cup in 1997, and the League Cup and Cup Winners' Cup in 1998. He won the FA Cup again in 2000, before leaving the club, after a brief spell as caretaker manager following Vialli's sacking by Ken Bates.

=== Portsmouth and Oxford ===
Rix managed Portsmouth between 2001 and 2002, where his enthusiastic style of management started well, but tapered off in the middle of the 2001–02 season. A string of poor results, including a 4–1 home loss in the FA Cup to bottom of the Football League Leyton Orient, meant that Director of Football Harry Redknapp was given more responsibilities until he eventually replaced Rix as team manager toward the end of the season. Rix then managed Oxford United for seven months in 2004. Their form declined sharply during the last three months of the 2003–04 Division Three campaign: they fell from the automatic promotion places to ninth in the final table, failing to achieve a playoff place. He was dismissed after their poor form continued into the 2004–05 season.

=== Hearts ===
In November 2005, after speculation linking him with the manager's job at Scottish Premier League club Heart of Midlothian, it was confirmed that Rix would take over at Tynecastle. He officially took the position of head coach on 8 November 2005. Events reported in February 2006, by Scottish newspapers, suggested that Rix was unhappy with Vladimir Romanov's "hands on" approach and speculation increased that Romanov was involved in team selection. On 22 March 2006 Rix was sacked as manager after just four months in charge, with the club citing poor results as the reason.

=== Central FC ===
On 13 August 2012, Rix was named the first manager of Central FC, which was a newly formed club founded by former Trinidad and Tobago international football player Brent Sancho, that competed in the TT Pro League. Rix recorded his first league win with Central FC on 19 October 2012 with a 1–0 win over Police. Rix and Central FC parted ways through mutual consent on 21 December 2012.

=== AFC Portchester and Fareham Town ===
In February 2013, he was appointed head coach of AFC Portchester. He left the club in August 2017.

In August 2022, Rix took over as manager of Wessex Football League side Fareham Town. He was dismissed by the club in May 2024.

== Underage sex conviction ==
In March 1999, Rix was convicted of having underage sex with a 15-year-old girl, and sentenced to 12 months in prison, of which he served six. He was placed on the sex offender registry for ten years and banned by the FA from working with youth players under the age of 16. In 2013 he told The Independent that he thought she was of legal age. On his release from prison, he immediately returned to his old job. He subsequently claimed that there were "mitigating circumstances" in the case, saying: "I know the true story that I've never ever said".

== Racism and bullying allegations ==
In 2018, Rix, along with assistant manager Gwyn Williams, was accused of racism and physical assault by several Chelsea trainees who were of school age at the time. It was alleged that Rix had thrown a cup of hot coffee in the face of one player. Both denied the allegations. After a seven-month investigation, the police decided there was insufficient evidence to take any action. In February 2022, Chelsea agreed to make payments to several former players who had sued the club.

== Personal life ==
Rix has a daughter from his first marriage with Gill. After getting divorced, he married his second wife, Linda. In April 2017, Rix suffered a heart attack.

== Honours ==
=== Player ===
Arsenal

- FA Cup: 1978–79; runner-up: 1977–78, 1979–80

=== Managerial ===
AFC Porchester

- Russell Cotes Cup: 2014
- Sydenhams Wessex League Cup: 2015

Sporting positions
Preceded by David O'Leary	Arsenal captain 1983–1986	Succeeded by Kenny Sansom
