= 1987 Football League Cup final =

- Match programme cover
- Event: 1986–87 Football League Cup
Arsenal	Liverpool
2	1
- Date: 5 April 1987
- Venue: Wembley Stadium, London
- Referee: Lester Shapter (Devon)
- Attendance: 96,000

The 1987 Football League Cup final was a football match played on 5 April 1987 between Arsenal and Liverpool. The match, played in front of 96,000 spectators at Wembley Stadium, was won by Arsenal 2–1. Ian Rush opened the scoring for Liverpool with a side foot finish to the corner of the net, before Charlie Nicholas equalised, turning in a cross from the right in a crowded penalty area. Nicholas was credited with scoring the winning goal in the second half from a Perry Groves cross. His off-target shot deflected off Ronnie Whelan and was diverted past Liverpool goalkeeper Bruce Grobbelaar's outstretched hand and into the left corner of the net.

Arsenal also finished fourth in the First Division, but were unable to compete in the 1987–88 UEFA Cup as UEFA voted for the ban in English clubs in European competitions to continue for a third season.

Ian Rush's goal was his first to be scored on the losing side in any competition. It ended Liverpool's 144-match unbeaten streak in matches he had scored in.

== Match details ==
5 April 1987
15:15 BST

Arsenal	2–1	Liverpool
Nicholas 30', 83'	Report; Report	Rush 23'

Wembley Stadium, London
Attendance: 96,000
Referee: Lester Shapter (Devon)

Arsenal	Liverpool

GK	1	(England) John Lukic
RB	2	(England) Viv Anderson
LB	3	(England) Kenny Sansom (c)
CM	4	(England) Steve Williams
CB	5	(Republic of Ireland) David O'Leary
CB	6	(England) Tony Adams
RM	7	(England) David Rocastle
CM	8	(England) Paul Davis
CF	9	(Republic of Ireland) Niall Quinn	(substituted off) 73'
CF	10	(Scotland) Charlie Nicholas
LM	11	(England) Martin Hayes	(substituted off) 83'
Substitutes:
MF	12	(England) Perry Groves	(substituted on) 73'
MF	14	(England) Michael Thomas	(substituted on) 83'
Manager:
(Scotland) George Graham

GK	1	(Zimbabwe) Bruce Grobbelaar
CB	2	(Scotland) Gary Gillespie
RB	3	(England) Barry Venison
LM	4	(England) Nigel Spackman
LB	5	(Republic of Ireland) Ronnie Whelan
CB	6	(Scotland) Alan Hansen (c)
CF	7	(England) Paul Walsh	(substituted off) 73'
RM	8	(Australia) Craig Johnston
CF	9	(Wales) Ian Rush
CM	10	(Denmark) Jan Mølby
CM	11	(England) Steve McMahon	(substituted off) 87'
Substitutes:
FW	12	(Scotland) Kenny Dalglish	(substituted on) 73'
MF	14	(Scotland) John Wark	(substituted on) 87'
Player / Manager:
(Scotland) Kenny Dalglish
