= Brian Marwood =

English footballer (born 1960)

Personal information
- Full name: Brian Marwood
- Date of birth: 5 February 1960 (age 66)
- Place of birth: Seaham, England
- Height: 5 ft 7 in (1.70 m)
- Position: Winger

Youth career
- 1976–1979: Hull City

Senior career*
Years	Team	Apps	(Gls)
1979–1984	Hull City	191	(53)
1984–1988	Sheffield Wednesday	128	(27)
1988–1990	Arsenal	52	(16)
1990–1992	Sheffield United	22	(3)
1992	→ Middlesbrough (loan)	3	(0)
1992–1993	Swindon Town	11	(1)
1993–1994	Barnet	23	(0)
Total		430	(100)

International career
1988	England	1	(0)
- * Club domestic league appearances and goals

Brian Marwood (born 5 February 1960) is an English former footballer who made more than 400 appearances in the Football League and was capped once for England. He is City Football Group's managing director of global football.

== Club career ==
=== Hull City ===
Born 5 February 1960 in Seaham, County Durham, Marwood started his career at Hull City, joining in 1976 as an apprentice and making his way up through the youth and reserve ranks. A pacy and tricky winger, he made his debut aged 19 in a Third Division match against Mansfield Town on 12 January 1980. He spent five seasons with the Tigers, during which time they were relegated to the Fourth Division and then promoted back to the third. After 1983–84, in which Hull City reached the Associate Members' Cup Final and narrowly missed out on promotion to the Second Division, Marwood attracted the interest of Sheffield Wednesday. In all he played 191 times for Hull and scored 53 goals.

=== Sheffield Wednesday ===
In June 1984 Marwood was signed by Sheffield Wednesday for £115,000.

The newly promoted Owls had a strong return to the top-flight under the guiding hand of manager Howard Wilkinson. In four seasons Marwood was a first team fixture. In 1985–86 the Owls finished 5th in the First Division and reached the FA Cup semi-finals. Marwood was joint top goalscorer in the League with centre forward Lee Chapman. Despite Wednesday's form tailing off after that, Marwood still shone in the side and after 128 appearances and 27 goals, he moved on.

=== Arsenal ===
Marwood was signed by Arsenal for £600,000 in March 1988, as manager George Graham was searching for a more dependable alternative to the erratic and injury prone Martin Hayes. He made his Arsenal debut against Oxford United on 30 March 1988. His first goal for the Gunners was a penalty in a 1–1 draw against Coventry City at Highbury 2 May 1988.

Marwood's impact at Arsenal was nearly immediate; his crosses supplied striker Alan Smith with goals throughout the 1988–89 season, in which Arsenal won the First Division title for the first time since 1971. Smith himself credits Marwood as being the most prolific supplier of assists while he was at Arsenal. He scored in each of Arsenals first four games in the winning season. He was also a reliable penalty taker and very accurate from corners and other dead ball situations. During this time, Marwood firmly established himself as the club's first choice left winger. Injury forced Marwood to miss the last five matches of the season, which included Arsenal's title-winning match against Liverpool at Anfield. Nevertheless, he still took away a league winners medal with 31 appearances that season. However, with the ban on English clubs in Europe still in place, Marwood was unable to play in the European Cup.

Injury restricted Marwood's chances in the 1989–90 season, and he only managed nineteen matches his final season at Arsenal. After Arsenal signed Swedish international winger Anders Limpar in the summer of 1990, Marwood was no longer an automatic first choice, in all he played 60 matches for Arsenal, scoring 17 goals. His last goal for the Gunners came at Maine Road against Manchester City 10 March 1990.

=== Sheffield United ===
He was sold to Sheffield United for £350,000 in September 1990.

In three seasons at United, Marwood only managed 22 appearances, and was loaned to Middlesbrough before making a permanent move to Swindon Town midway through 1992–93; Marwood played eleven times as Swindon won promotion to the Premier League, but was released by the club that summer.

=== Barnet ===
He finished his career at Barnet where he spent one season, playing 23 games as Barnet were relegated from Division Two.

== International career ==
Marwood's performances for Arsenal earned him an England cap, in a friendly match against Saudi Arabia in Riyadh on 16 November 1988. As a 28-year-old he came on as a late substitution, replacing Michael Thomas, under manager Bobby Robson.

== Professional Footballers' Association ==
Marwood was chairman of the Professional Footballers' Association between 1990 and 1993.

== Career after retirement ==
Since retirement, Marwood has written his autobiography, The Life of Brian (ISBN 1-85158-367-X), and became a commentator on BBC Radio 5 Live, Sky Sports and STAR Sports. He worked as UK sports marketing manager for Nike from 1997 to 2009.

=== Manchester City ===
He joined Manchester City with the title of football administrator in 2009, being an ex-colleague of former executive chairman, Garry Cook, at Nike.

== Family ==
His son James was a former player at Newcastle United, St Mirren, Forest Green Rovers and Gateshead United. He currently coaches at Middlesbrough FC academy

== Honours ==
Hull City

- Associate Members' Cup runner-up: 1983–84

Arsenal

- Football League First Division: 1988-89
- Football League Centenary Trophy: 1988

== Footnotes ==
1. "Alan Smith interview". Arseweb.
1. Taylor, Daniel (23 February 2009). "Marwood to assist Hughes at City". guardian.co.uk. London.
2. https://www.arsenal.com/men/brian-marwood-akDgz8t0QmLTRetrieved 28 September 2026
