= Nigel Winterburn =

English footballer (born 1963)

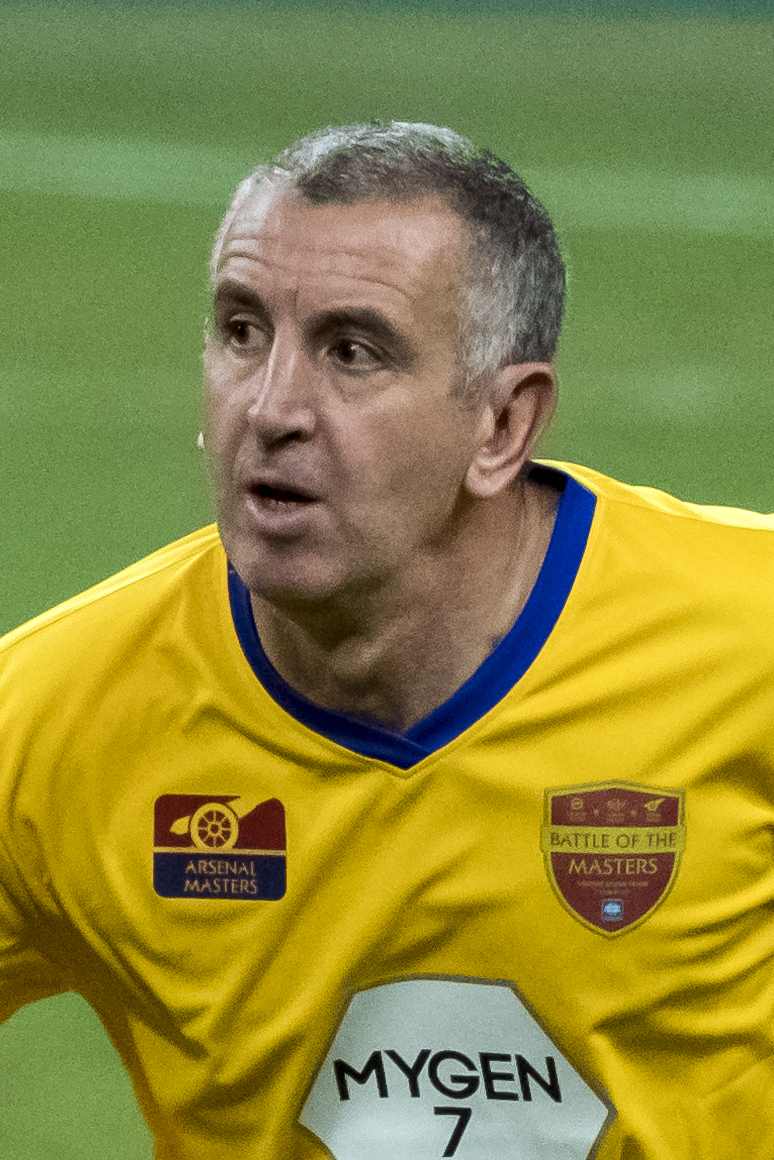
- Winterburn during a friendly match in 2017

Personal information
- Full name: Nigel Winterburn
- Date of birth: 11 December 1963 (age 62)
- Place of birth: Arley, Warwickshire, England
- Height: 5 ft 8 in (1.73 m)
- Position: Left back

Senior career*
Years	Team	Apps	(Gls)
1981–1982	Birmingham City	0	(0)
1982–1983	Oxford United	0	(0)
1983–1987	Wimbledon	165	(8)
1987–2000	Arsenal	440	(8)
2000–2003	West Ham United	82	(1)
Total		687	(17)

International career
1982	England Youth	1	(0)
1986	England U21	1	(0)
1990–1991	England B	3	(0)
1989–1993	England	2	(0)
- * Club domestic league appearances and goals

Nigel Winterburn (born 11 December 1963) is an English former professional footballer who made 687 appearances in the Football League and Premier League. He was capped twice by England, in 1989 and 1993.

Winterburn played primarily as a left back from 1981 to 2003. He is best known for his role alongside Tony Adams, Steve Bould, Martin Keown and Lee Dixon, forming the defensive line for Arsenal in the Premier League and European football during the 1990s. He also played for Wimbledon and West Ham United, and was contracted to Birmingham City and Oxford United.

After his playing career ended, he went into media work. He was briefly a part of the coaching staff at Blackburn Rovers.

== Playing career ==
=== Birmingham City ===
Winterburn was born in Arley, Warwickshire. He became an apprentice at Birmingham City in May 1980 before turning professional in 1981 after he had played for Nuneaton schoolboys. While at Birmingham City, Winterburn won an England Youth Cap but failed to make the Birmingham first team. After an unsuccessful trial at Oxford United, he was signed by Dave Bassett to join Wimbledon on a free transfer in August 1983.

=== Wimbledon ===
Winterburn contributed to Wimbledon's promotion from Division Three to Division Two in 1983–84, and from Division Two to Division One two years later. Winterburn was voted Wimbledon's Player of the Year in each of his four seasons with the club. He missed only 7 out of 172 league games, was ever-present in 1986–87 when Wimbledon finished sixth in the First Division, and was capped by the England under-21 team. In May 1987 he was transferred for £350,000 to Arsenal, whose manager, George Graham, was seeking a long-term replacement for Kenny Sansom.

=== Arsenal ===
Winterburn began his Arsenal career at right-back, an emergency measure employed by Graham after he had been unsuccessful in finding a replacement for Viv Anderson. Winterburn made his Arsenal league debut as a substitute at Highbury against Southampton on 21 November 1987, playing in 17 league games that season.

Though primarily left-footed, Winterburn settled into the right-back role and became quickly involved in two controversial incidents in his first season. First, he was seen to openly goad Brian McClair after the Manchester United striker had missed a late penalty in an FA Cup tie on 20 February 1988 at Highbury. The second incident came in the League Cup final later that same season. Despite having fallen behind in the early stages, Arsenal, the holders, were leading Luton Town 2–1 at Wembley with less than quarter of an hour to go when Arsenal were awarded a penalty after David Rocastle was fouled. Michael Thomas had been Arsenal's designated penalty taker all season but after spot-kick failures from Thomas and two subsequent successors, it was Winterburn – who had never taken a penalty for Arsenal before – who stepped up to take the kick. He struck powerfully towards to the bottom right-hand corner as he viewed it, but Luton goalkeeper Andy Dibble guessed correctly and pushed the ball round the post. A newly inspired Luton then scored twice in the final ten minutes and won the final 3–2.

Sansom, demoted to reserve team football, left Arsenal for Newcastle United in December 1988 and Winterburn settled into his more familiar left back role as a result, staying in it for more than a decade. He and fellow full back Lee Dixon flanked two superb central defenders in captain Tony Adams and veteran David O'Leary, joined during the 1989 season by Steve Bould. Often the manager would play all five of them as Arsenal took holders Liverpool to a last-game showdown at Anfield for the First Division title, which would have been Arsenal's first title since the Double year of 1971. Arsenal's situation meant they needed to win by at least two clear goals to clinch the championship. Winterburn's free kick set up a first for Alan Smith shortly after half-time, but the second looked as though it would elude them until Thomas scored in injury time. This victory was the culmination of the film Fever Pitch.

In the penultimate game, a 2–2 draw at home to Wimbledon on 17 May 1989, Winterburn scored what some consider the finest goal of his career, driving the ball diagonally into the far, top corner from 25 yards with his little-used right foot. Given both points and goal difference were identical (Arsenal winning the league on more goals scored), every single goal Arsenal scored that campaign eventually proved decisive in winning the league, but had Arsenal lost that day, then the Anfield game would have been irrelevant as the title would have already been lost.

Winterburn made his England debut later the same year, 15 November 1989, coming on as a substitute in a 0–0 draw against Italy. Though many media outlets and Winterburn's own club manager regularly extolled his virtues as an England left back, the national coach, Bobby Robson, had him as no higher than third in the pecking order. Stuart Pearce was going to the 1990 World Cup as first choice, with Tony Dorigo as back-up. Only injury to either would see a way open for Winterburn, and that did not happen; however, he did earn appearances for the B team.

Arsenal earned no trophies in 1990, but went on to win the league title again the next year with one loss. During a 1–0 victory away at Manchester United, there was a mass brawl that was started by a Winterburn tackle on Denis Irwin. Winterburn was eventually booked, and subsequently fined two weeks wages (along with 3 teammates and the manager, George Graham). Despite the two-point deduction – one more than Manchester United as Arsenal had been involved in a similar brawl against Norwich City in 1989 – Arsenal went on to win the league comfortably.

Two years later, Winterburn was in the Arsenal team which won both cup competitions and thus completed his domestic set of medals. Arsenal defeated Sheffield Wednesday 2–1 in both the League Cup and FA Cup finals, the latter in a replay.

Winterburn's form earned him a brief England recall by Graham Taylor, who included him in a squad for a mini-tournament in the U.S. during which England lost 2–0 to the United States national team. Winterburn came on as a sub for Manchester United winger Lee Sharpe in the final match of the contest against Germany. This was the last time he played for England.

In 1994, Arsenal beat Italian side Parma 1–0, to win the European Cup Winners Cup, Arsenal's first success continentally for a quarter of a century. They would not be so successful the following year as they reached the final again but were beaten 2–1 by Real Zaragoza.

Arsène Wenger arrived at Arsenal at the end of 1996, bringing a new focus on self-awareness and dietary habits into the Arsenal squad. This allowed the ageing defence (Adams was the youngest at 30 years of age; Martin Keown had also arrived to account for O'Leary's retirement after the 1993 FA Cup success) to thrive in and prolong the latter years of their careers. Arsenal won the "double" of Premiership and FA Cup in 1998. During the league campaign in September 1997, as against Wimbledon in 1989, Winterburn once again scored a vital goal, driving the ball from over 25 yards diagonally into the far, top corner, this time with his favoured left foot. The 89th-minute winner, in a 3–2 Arsenal victory against Chelsea away at Stamford Bridge, moved Arsenal up to 2nd in the table. Winterburn was called up by caretaker manager Howard Wilkinson for the England squad in a friendly against France in 1999 but he was the odd one out from Wilkinson's first XI – Seaman, Adams, Keown and Dixon all started but Winterburn lost out to Graeme Le Saux for the left-back slot and stayed on the bench for the 2–0 defeat.

In 1999–2000, Arsenal again failed to progress beyond the group stages of the Champions League, and therefore entered the UEFA Cup at the third round, where they were drawn against Nantes. During the first leg, which Arsenal won 3–0, Winterburn again scored with a drive into the far, top corner, though this time only from just outside the box. Arsenal went on to reach the UEFA Cup final but Winterburn had been forced out of the team by the Brazilian Sylvinho, although he in turn was displaced by the fledgling Ashley Cole within another 12 months.

=== West Ham United ===
Winterburn joined West Ham United in June 2000 for a fee of £250,000 after making 429 league appearances and scoring eight goals for Arsenal. He played 94 games in all competitions for West Ham, scoring one goal in a 1–0 away win against Leeds United on 18 November 2000. He retired in 2003, with his last game played on 2 February 2003 against Liverpool.

== International career ==
Winterburn made his full debut for England on 15 November 1989 against Italy. He made his second and final appearance for the senior national side nearly four years later on 19 June 1993 against Germany. The regular England left back at this stage was Stuart Pearce.

== Coaching career ==
On 14 July 2008, Winterburn joined Paul Ince's backroom staff at Blackburn Rovers as defensive coach. Following Ince's dismissal in December 2008, Winterburn was deemed surplus to requirements at Ewood Park. New manager Sam Allardyce stated, "I spoke to Nigel Winterburn today to say that, from my point of view, in terms of specialist defensive coaching, I think I can look after that area myself now."

== Media career ==
In 2013, Winterburn became a pundit for BT Sport at the start of their football coverage. He regularly appears on the programme BT Sport Score.

== Honours ==
Arsenal

- Football League First Division: 1988–89, 1990–91
- Premier League: 1997–98
- FA Cup: 1992–93, 1997–98
- Football League Cup: 1992–93; runner-up: 1987–88
- Football League Centenary Trophy: 1988
- FA Charity Shield: 1991 (shared), 1998, 1999
- European Cup Winners' Cup: 1993–94

Individual

- Arsenal Player of the Season: 1998–99
