= David Hutchinson (referee) =

English football referee

- Full name: David Hutchinson
- Born: England
- Other occupation: Police inspector

Domestic
Years	League	Role
1978–1990	English Football League	Referee

David Hutchinson is a former English football referee who served on the list from 1978 to 1990. Arguably the most notable match refereed by Hutchinson was the last game of the 1988–89 season between Arsenal and Liverpool, one of the most famous games in the history of English football.

He also was the referee for the infamous FA Cup Quarter Final between Luton and Millwall in 1985.

== Career ==
Hutchinson was in charge of the final match of the 1988–89 season, a game Arsenal needed to win by two clear goals in order to beat Liverpool to the league title. He was confronted by the Liverpool players angrily protesting that Arsenal's first goal, a header by Alan Smith, should have been disallowed. Hutchinson consulted with his linesman to confirm he had made the correct decision in awarding the goal. The linesman confirmed this and thus the goals stood. Hutchinson commented that he couldn't understand why the Liverpool players were protesting nor why their protests were so strong. Liverpool player Ray Houghton later admitted that none of the Liverpool players really knew what they were protesting about and they were just taken aback that they had conceded the goal.

He was a police inspector in Cambridgeshire and was on central service at the Home Office Central Planning Unit, Harrogate.
