= Steve Williams (footballer, born 1958) =

English footballer

Personal information
- Full name: Steven Charles Williams
- Date of birth: 12 July 1958 (age 68)
- Place of birth: Romford, England
- Height: 5 ft 11 in (1.80 m)
- Position: Midfielder

Youth career
- 1974–1976: Southampton

Senior career*
Years	Team	Apps	(Gls)
1976–1984	Southampton	279	(18)
1984–1988	Arsenal	95	(4)
1988–1991	Luton Town	40	(1)
1991–1993	Exeter City	48	(0)
1993	Derry City	2	(0)
Total		464	(23)

International career
1977–1980	England U21	14	(0)
1979–1981	England B	4	(0)
1983–1984	England	6	(0)
- * Club domestic league appearances and goals

Steven Charles Williams (born 12 July 1958) is an English former professional footballer who played as a midfielder.

He began his playing career with Southampton in 1976. Williams joined Arsenal in 1984 and spent four years with the club. In 1988, he signed for Luton Town. He also had a spell with Exeter City before he ended his career at Derry City.

During his international career, he won six caps for the England national team.

== Early life ==
Williams was born in 1958 in Romford, Essex. His parents ran a grocery shop. Williams excelled in sport at a young age, but he admitted opportunities were limited as his parents were too busy.

== Club career ==
=== Southampton ===
He started out as an apprentice with Southampton, having been a product of the Saints' London Selection Centre and joining the club straight from school.

He turned professional in 1975 and made his debut aged 17 on 6 April 1976, in a 1–0 victory away to local rivals, Portsmouth in a game where Peter Osgood was dropped for disciplinary reasons.

He went on to establish a partnership with Alan Ball, with Ball's short passing game being complemented by Williams' deep surges into the opposition half. After his first full season at Southampton in 1976–77, he was awarded the club's Player of the Season Award and earned recognition for England at under-21 level.

In the 1978–79 season, he was an ever-present in Saints' run to the 1979 League Cup final which they lost 3–2 to Brian Clough's Nottingham Forest. He succeeded Alan Ball as team captain and led The Saints to an FA Cup semi-final and to runners-up position in the 1983–84 First Division.

The following season, manager Lawrie McMenemy was becoming disillusioned with Southampton, feeling that he had taken the club as far as he could and this disillusionment spread to several senior players including Williams, leading to a transfer request. In all, he played 349 times for Southampton, scoring 27 goals.

=== Arsenal ===
In December 1984 Williams moved to his boyhood club Arsenal for £550,000. After making his debut in a North London derby match against Tottenham Hotspur on 1 January 1985, Williams was a regular for the remainder of the season. However, his next season, 1985–86, he suffered toe and hamstring injuries which limited his appearances in the side.

By the time he had recovered, George Graham had taken over as Arsenal manager, and initially Williams thrived, playing on the right hand side of midfield, alongside a young David Rocastle. In Graham's first season, Arsenal reached the League Cup final, where they beat Liverpool, with Williams collecting his first piece of silverware. Williams continued to play throughout the next season, but after Arsenal lost to Manchester United in January 1988, Williams was dropped to allow Michael Thomas to push forward into midfield. Unable to reclaim his place in the side, Williams fell out with Graham. In all he played 121 games for Arsenal, scoring five goals.

=== Later career ===
In July 1988, Williams moved to Luton Town, where he spent three seasons at Luton, before finishing his career at Exeter City, where he was also assistant manager to his former Southampton colleague, Alan Ball. His eventually retired in 1993, after a brief playing spell at Derry City where he made his League of Ireland debut against Shamrock Rovers in October 1993.

== International career ==
Williams played fourteen times for England's under-21s. He also won six caps for England, his debut coming against Australia on 12 June 1983.

== After football ==
After retiring from football, he went into the magazine publishing business in Exeter. He has since gone into property development.

== Honours ==
Southampton

- Football League Cup runner-up: 1978–79

Arsenal

- Football League Cup: 1986–87

Individual

- Southampton Player of the Season: 1977
