= Martin Hayes (footballer) =

English footballer and manager

Personal information
- Full name: Martin Hayes
- Date of birth: 21 March 1966 (age 60)
- Place of birth: Walthamstow, England
- Height: 6 ft 0 in (1.83 m)
- Positions: Winger; attacking midfielder

Youth career
- 1982–1983: Arsenal

Senior career*
Years	Team	Apps	(Gls)
1983–1990	Arsenal	102	(26)
1990–1993	Celtic	7	(0)
1991	→ Coventry City (loan)	0	(0)
1992	→ Wimbledon (loan)	2	(0)
1993–1995	Swansea City	61	(8)
1995	Southend United	0	(0)
1995	Dover Athletic	18	(5)
1995–1996	Cliftonville	3	(0)
1996	Crawley Town		
1996–1997	Collier Row & Romford	58	(29)
1998	Purfleet		
1997–1999	Romford	69	(28)
1999–2001	Bishop's Stortford		
Total		320	(104)

International career
1987–1988	England U21	3	(0)

Managerial career
- 1999–2008: Bishop's Stortford
- 2009–2010: Wingate & Finchley
- 2010–2011: Dover Athletic
- 2015–2016: Waltham Abbey
- * Club domestic league appearances and goals

Martin Hayes (born 21 March 1966) is an English football manager and former player. As a player, he made 165 appearances in the Football League. He most recently managed Waltham Abbey.

== Club career ==
=== Early career ===
Hayes played youth football for Essex schoolboys before joining Arsenal as an apprentice in June 1982.

=== Arsenal ===
A promising attacking player, either up front or on the left wing, Hayes impressed in the Arsenal youth and reserve teams, and made his first-team debut against Oxford United on 16 November 1985 at the age of 19. In that first season of first team football he played in 14 games, scoring three goals, when initially deputising for Graham Rix. Just weeks before the end of the season, Don Howe, the manager who had given Hayes his debut, stepped down as manager following reports that Arsenal had offered his job to Terry Venables, but when the new manager was announced a few weeks later it was George Graham who took over. And fortunately for Hayes, he remained in the new manager's plans.

With the ageing Rix starting to tire, Hayes soon established himself as Arsenal's regular left winger, and in 1986–87 he was the club's top scorer with 24 goals, 12 of them being penalties; he also played in the Gunners' League Cup-winning team that year, beating Liverpool 2–1. However, he could not continue this form the following season, and only scored three times – one of them being the opening goal in the League Cup final against Luton Town. However, Hayes also hit the post from a yard out when Arsenal were 2–1 up, and Luton staged a late comeback to take the game 3–2. The arrival of Brian Marwood in March threw his first team chances into serious doubt.

Hayes began to lose his form, and although he played 17 matches of Arsenal's 1988–89 First Division campaign, 14 of them were as substitute as new arrival Brian Marwood became Arsenal's regular on the left. However, he played an adequate number of games to qualify for a title winner's medal to add to his League Cup winner's medal from two years previously. He was on the pitch as a substitute in the final game of the season when Michael Thomas famously scored the title clinching goal at Anfield.

In all he played 132 matches for Arsenal, scoring 34 goals. His final season, 1989–90, brought him 12 First Division appearances and three goals, and he did not make a single first team appearance in the 1990–91 season.

=== Celtic ===
With Alan Smith as centre forward and Paul Merson on the left wing dominating up front, Hayes couldn't find any way into the Arsenal side in his favoured position, and after another season on the fringes, he left Arsenal on 29 September 1990 to join Celtic for £650,000. Hayes only played seven matches for Celtic, however, and never had a lengthy spell in the first team.

=== Swansea City ===
After a loan spell with Wimbledon, Hayes joined Swansea City in 1993, and spent two seasons at the Vetch Field. Hayes won the Football League Trophy with them in 1994, but the following year he was released on a free transfer. At the age of 29, a professional career which had once looked so promising was over.

=== Cliftonville F.C. ===
Hayes made his Irish League debut for the Reds on the 27 January 1996.

=== Non-league ===
Hayes had spells in non-league football with Dover Athletic, Crawley Town, Romford, Purfleet and eventually Bishop's Stortford.

== International career ==
Hayes won three England U21 caps during his time at Arsenal, but never played for the senior team.

== Management and coaching ==
Hayes became player-manager at Bishop's Stortford in 1999 and remained in charge until 24 November 2008, when his contract was terminated after almost a decade in charge.

In February 2009, he was appointed manager of Isthmian League First Division One North side Wingate & Finchley. In June 2010, he was appointed manager of Dover Athletic, a job he held until September 2011.

During his time at Dover Athletic, he guided the club to their most successful FA Cup run, reaching the third-round proper, where they lost at Huddersfield 2–0 in January 2011, having won a game against Kent neighbours Gillingham 2–0 in the first round and beating Aldershot 2–0 at home in the second round.

Hayes went on to manage Waltham Abbey, resigning in January 2016.

== Personal life ==
Hayes was born in Walthamstow, London. He is the brother of Paul Hayes, a striker who is 17 years his junior.

== Honours ==
Arsenal

- Football League First Division: 1988–89,
- Football League Cup: 1986–87; runner-up: 1987–88
