= Football League Centenary Trophy =

Tournament details
- Country: England
- Dates: 29 August – 9 October 1988
- Teams: 8

Final positions
- Champions: Arsenal
- Runners-up: Manchester United

Tournament statistics
- Matches played: 7
- Goals scored: 17 (2.43 per match)
- Attendance: 130,025 (18,575 per match)
- Top goal scorer(s): Brian Marwood (2 goals)

The Football League Centenary Trophy, also known as the Mercantile Credit Centenary Trophy for sponsorship reasons, was an English football tournament held during the 1988–89 season to celebrate the 100th birthday of The Football League. The competition was played on a knockout basis between the top eight sides from the Football League First Division the previous season, with the final between Arsenal and Manchester United taking place at the birthplace of League football, Aston Villa's home ground, Villa Park on 9 October 1988.

Goals from Paul Davis and Michael Thomas gave Arsenal a 2–1 victory, with Clayton Blackmore the scorer for United. Despite most of the country's leading clubs being involved, crowds for the Centenary Trophy were generally disappointing and only the semi-final match between Arsenal and Liverpool attracted more than 25,000.

== Background ==
The Football League marked its centenary during the 1987–88 and 1988–89 seasons with a number of events; an exhibition game between a Football League XI and a World XI in August 1987, followed by a Football League Centenary Tournament eight months later. The final centrepiece was the Football League Centenary Trophy, a one-off tournament which commenced at the start of the 1988–89 season. The clubs which qualified for the tournament were the previous season's top eight, as follows:

First Division table
| Pos | Team | Pld | W | D | L | GF | GA | GD | Pts |
|---|---|---|---|---|---|---|---|---|---|
| 1 | Liverpool | 40 | 26 | 12 | 2 | 87 | 24 | +63 | 90 |
| 2 | Manchester United | 40 | 23 | 12 | 5 | 71 | 38 | +33 | 81 |
| 3 | Nottingham Forest | 40 | 20 | 13 | 7 | 67 | 39 | +28 | 73 |
| 4 | Everton | 40 | 19 | 13 | 8 | 53 | 27 | +26 | 70 |
| 5 | Queens Park Rangers | 40 | 19 | 10 | 11 | 48 | 38 | +10 | 67 |
| 6 | Arsenal | 40 | 18 | 12 | 10 | 58 | 39 | +19 | 66 |
| 7 | Wimbledon | 40 | 14 | 15 | 11 | 58 | 47 | +11 | 57 |
| 8 | Newcastle United | 40 | 14 | 14 | 12 | 55 | 53 | +2 | 56 |

== Matches ==
=== Quarter-finals ===
The quarter-finals were staged over three days in August 1988. Liverpool recorded the biggest win of the round, defeating Nottingham Forest 4–1 at a half-capacity Anfield. The home side rested striker John Aldridge and started Ian Rush who player-manager Kenny Dalglish said "...needed some matches. We might as well get him as fit as we can, as quickly as we can." All of Liverpool's four goals came in the second half; Barry Venison set them on their way to victory with a well-hit shot in the 50th minute. Manchester United meanwhile secured a place in the semi-finals with a 1–0 win against Everton. Gordon Strachan scored the game's only goal in the second half, heading in at the far post, with manager Alex Ferguson stating post-match: "You're waiting for your first goal of the season, you've got people like [Brian] McClair and [Mark] Hughes on the park and it comes from Gordon Strachan's head!" Newcastle United needed extra time to overcome their opponents Wimbledon; the tie was settled by Michael O'Neill's goal in the 109th minute. Arsenal completed the semi-final line up with a 2–0 win away at Queens Park Rangers.

29 August 1988
15:00 BST

| Liverpool | 4–1 | Nottingham Forest |
|---|---|---|
| Venison 50'; Mølby 70' (pen.); Houghton 75'; Barnes 84' | | Webb 90' |

Anfield, Liverpool
Attendance: 20,141
Referee: G.Tyson (Sunderland)
29 August 1988
15:00 BST

| Manchester United | 1–0 | Everton |
|---|---|---|
| Strachan 66' |

Old Trafford, Manchester
Attendance: 16,439
Referee: G. Alpin (Westmorland County)
29 August 1988
19:30 BST

| Newcastle United | 1–0 (a.e.t.) | Wimbledon |
|---|---|---|
| O'Neill 109' |

St James' Park, Newcastle
Attendance: 17,141
Referee: Keith Hackett (South Yorkshire)
31 August 1988
19:45 BST

| Queens Park Rangers | 0–2 | Arsenal |
|---|---|---|
| | | Adams 3'; Marwood 76' |

Loftus Road, London
Attendance: 10,019
Referee: Roger Milford (Somerset)

=== Semi-finals ===
The semi-finals were played over two days in September 1988. Arsenal faced Liverpool at their home ground, Highbury. Injuries to eight first-team players, notably goalkeeper Bruce Grobbelaar, defender Alan Hansen, and winger John Barnes meant the visitors fielded an unfamiliar side, one which required the involvement of Dalglish towards the end of the tie. Arsenal took the lead just after the half-hour mark when a corner was flicked on by Alan Smith and Perry Groves was in space to nudge the ball past Mike Hooper. Liverpool equalised in the second half through Steve Staunton, but Brian Marwood's volley restored Arsenal's lead and they held on for a place in the final.

The second semi-final tie, between Manchester United and Newcastle United at Old Trafford was decided in extra time. An audience of just under 15,000 – "one of the smallest crowds to gather at Old Trafford for a senior fixture in many years" – saw two halves of insipid attacking football but stout defending. Newcastle came close to scoring the winner two minutes before normal time was up, only for substitute Mirandinha to miss. Defender Steve Bruce scored inside 44 seconds of extra time, and ten minutes later McClair headed in to give United a 2–0 win.

20 September 1988
19:45 BST

| Arsenal | 2–1 | Liverpool |
|---|---|---|
| Groves 33'; Marwood 82' | | Staunton 80' |

Highbury, London
Attendance: 29,135
Referee: John Martin (Wessex)
21 September 1988
19:30 BST

| Manchester United | 2–0 (a.e.t.) | Newcastle United |
|---|---|---|
| Bruce 91'; McClair 101' |

Old Trafford, Manchester
Attendance: 14,968
Referee: John Key (South Yorkshire)

=== Final ===
The tournament reached its climax on 9 October 1988, when Arsenal competed against Manchester United. The match was held at Villa Park. Before the match United captain Bryan Robson told a reporter there was "not so much pressure" on his teammates to win the competition, but noted the incentive of beating Arsenal as the winners stood to receive £50,000. The first half, played under drizzle, saw Arsenal score twice in four minutes to take a commanding lead before the break. Paul Davis broke the deadlock, before he turned provider and set Michael Thomas up to score their second. Once the rain stopped and United introduced Strachan on to the field, both sides played at a frantic pace. United ended the second half strongly, and scored with six minutes of normal time remaining through Clayton Blackmore. Strachan almost equalised but for Lee Dixon's intervention on the goal line.

Journalist Ian Ridley praised the end-to-end nature of the final and felt it showcased the best of English football, writing in The Guardian: "[It] illustrated perfectly the major development in the modern game; the swiftness that English supporters demand and that excites overseas viewers." In his match report, Steve Curry of the Daily Express summarised: "The League’s centenary celebrations have, overall, been a shambles, but this rousing finale at least left one worthwhile memory."

9 October 1988
15:00 BST

| Arsenal | 2–1 | Manchester United |
|---|---|---|
| Davis 36'; Thomas 40' | | Blackmore 84' |

Villa Park, Birmingham
Attendance: 22,182
Referee: George Courtney (County Durham)

== Goalscorers ==
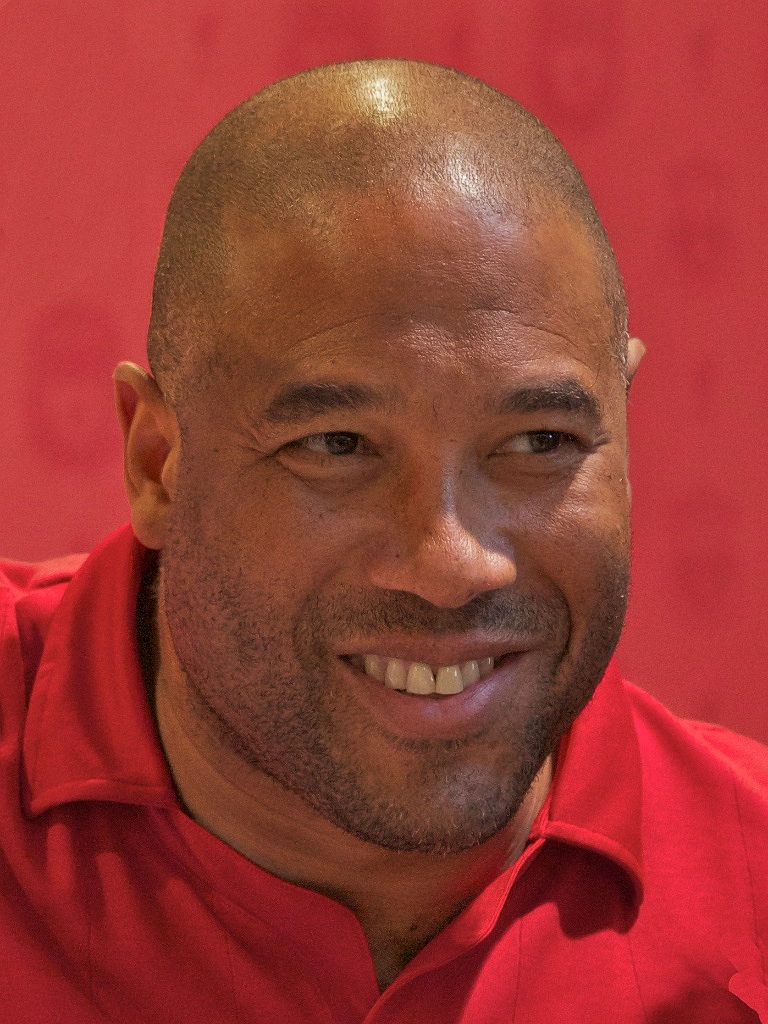
John Barnes (pictured in 2012), scored his only goal of the tournament for Liverpool against Nottingham Forest.

| Rank | Name | Team | Goals |
|---|---|---|---|
| 1 | (England) Brian Marwood | Arsenal | 2 |
| 2 | (England) Tony Adams | Arsenal | 1 |
| 2 | (England) John Barnes | Liverpool | 1 |
| 2 | (Wales) Clayton Blackmore | Manchester United | 1 |
| 2 | (England) Steve Bruce | Manchester United | 1 |
| 2 | (England) Paul Davis | Arsenal | 1 |
| 2 | (England) Perry Groves | Arsenal | 1 |
| 2 | (Republic of Ireland) Ray Houghton | Liverpool | 1 |
| 2 | (Scotland) Brian McClair | Manchester United | 1 |
| 2 | (Denmark) Jan Mølby | Liverpool | 1 |
| 2 | (Northern Ireland) Michael O'Neill | Newcastle United | 1 |
| 2 | (Scotland) Gordon Strachan | Manchester United | 1 |
| 2 | (England) Michael Thomas | Arsenal | 1 |
| 2 | (England) Barry Venison | Liverpool | 1 |
| 2 | (England) Neil Webb | Nottingham Forest | 1 |
