= 1981–82 Arsenal F.C. season =

English football club season

Arsenal F.C.
1981–82 season
- Chairman: Denis Hill-Wood
- Manager: Terry Neill
- First Division: 5th
- FA Cup: Third Round
- League Cup: Fourth Round
- UEFA Cup: Second Round
- Top goalscorer: League: Alan Sunderland (11); All: Alan Sunderland (12)
Home colours	Away colours

The 1981–82 season was Arsenal Football Club's 56th consecutive season in the top flight of English football. The club ended their campaign fifth in the Football League First Division. After losing Liam Brady in 1980, Arsenal lost Frank Stapleton, Arsenal's 1980-81 top scorer, to Manchester United. Pat Rice also departed Arsenal for Watford and David O'Leary assumed the captaincy.

Losing to Stoke at home on opening day boded poorly for the season. In January, goalkeeper Pat Jennings was injured and George Wood took his place. Arsenal also performed poorly in cup competitions, losing to rivals Tottenham Hotspur in the third round of the FA Cup and to Belgian semi-professional team KFC Winterslag in the UEFA Cup.

Alan Sunderland was Arsenal's top scorer. However, he only slightly improved on his previous goalscoring form, and Arsenal continuously suffered from a lack of goals.

JVC were the team's first shirt sponsor, the first time Arsenal had ever had the name of a sponsor on their shirts.

== Season summary ==
The start of the 1981/82 season went poorly for Arsenal manager Terry Neill. After losing Liam Brady in the summer of 1980, Frank Stapleton was the next star to leave Highbury, joining Manchester United in August 1981. Arsenal received only £1.5 million for the departure of their two stars, making it difficult to find replacements. Captain Pat Rice also left the club, departing for Watford. David O'Leary became the captain.

Terry Neill made several purchases but could not fill the team's absences. John Hawley joined Arsenal from Sunderland for £51,000 and scored 3 goals in 20 games, but he was soon sent on consecutive loans to Leyton Orient and Hull City. Hawley's former strike partner Ray Hankin briefly joined Arsenal from the Vancouver Whitecaps, but he appeared only twice (both times as a substitute in the League Cup) and no permanent move ensued.

This season was the first season that Arsenal bore the name of a sponsor on their shirts. The Japan Victor Company, or JVC as they’re better known, had the honour of being Arsenal’s first shirt sponsor.

A third-place finish during the previous campaign had seen Neill’s men go through the season unbeaten at home. But alarm bells immediately chimed when Stoke left Highbury victorious on the opening day of the 81/82 season. Five defeats in their first twelve League matches indicated that all was not well, and more worryingly the team had scored just eight goals in the process of slumping to 14th place in the table.

There was a welcome distraction in the UEFA Cup. Two wins against Panathinaikos, saw the club go through to the next round. And when Belgian part-timers Winterslag were paired with Arsenal in the draw for the second round, it looked as if Neill could at least look forward to another European trip in the last 16 of the competition. But again, Arsenal would pay for their wastefulness in front of goal. Arsenal won the second leg 2-1, but went out on the away goals rule and they were stunned when Winterslag went through. In fairness to Neill, the team did respond well after the Winterslag debacle. Five straight league wins, and just six defeats in the remaining 30 matches saw the club finish fifth in the League.

On 2 January 1982 Pat Jennings found himself on the treatment table, after a disappointing FA Cup third round exit, 0-1 against Tottenham Hotspur after an error by Jennings, and a groin injury forced him to limp off with 15 minutes to go. Due to substitution rules at the time, Peter Nicholas (beset by his own injury problems throughout the season) took to the goal. Scottish keeper George Wood assumed the No 1 spot until the end of the season.

== Squad ==
Note: Flags indicate national team as defined under FIFA eligibility rules; some limited exceptions apply. Players may hold more than one non-FIFA nationality.

Pos.	Nation	Player
GK	SCO	George Wood
DF	ENG	John Hollins
DF	ENG	Kenny Sansom
MF	ENG	Brian Talbot
DF	IRL	David O'Leary
DF	ENG	Chris Whyte
MF	ENG	Stewart Robson
MF	ENG	Paul Davis
FW	ENG	Alan Sunderland
MF	WAL	Peter Nicholas
MF	ENG	Graham Rix

Pos.	Nation	Player
GK	NIR	Pat Jennings
FW	ENG	John Hawley
DF	IRL	John Devine
DF	SCO	Willie Young
MF	ENG	Brian McDermott
FW	ENG	Paul Vaessen
FW	ENG	Raphael Meade
MF	IRL	Paul Gorman
FW	ENG	Ray Hankin

== Results ==
=== First Division ===
Pos	Team	Pld	W	D	L	GF	GA	GD	Pts	Qualification or relegation
3	Manchester United	42	22	12	8	59	29	+30	78	Qualification for the UEFA Cup first round
4	Tottenham Hotspur	42	20	11	11	67	48	+19	71	Qualification for the Cup Winners' Cup first round (Note: Tottenham Hotspur qualified for the European Cup Winners' Cup first round as the 1981–82 FA Cup winners.)
5	Arsenal	42	20	11	11	48	37	+11	71	Qualification for the UEFA Cup first round
6	Swansea City	42	21	6	15	58	51	+7	69	Qualification for the Cup Winners' Cup preliminary round (Note: Swansea City qualified for the European Cup Winners' Cup preliminary round as the 1982 Welsh Cup winners.)
7	Southampton	42	19	9	14	72	67	+5	66	Qualification for the UEFA Cup first round

Source: World Football
Rules for classification: 1) Points; 2) Goal difference; 3) Goals scored
Notes:

29 August 1981 1	Arsenal	0–1	Stoke City	London
				Stadium: Highbury

2 September 1981 2	West Bromwich Albion	0–2	Arsenal	West Bromwich
				Stadium: The Hawthorns

5 September 1981 3	Liverpool	2–0	Arsenal	Liverpool
				Stadium: Anfield

12 September 1981 4	Arsenal	1–1	Sunderland	London
				Stadium: Highbury

19 September 1981 5	Leeds United	0–0	Arsenal	Leeds
				Stadium: Elland Road

22 September 1981 6	Arsenal	1–0	Birmingham City	London
				Stadium: Highbury

26 September 1981 7	Arsenal	0–0	Manchester United	London
				Stadium: Highbury

3 October 1981 8	Notts County	2–1	Arsenal	Nottingham
				Stadium: Meadow Lane

10 October 1981 9	Swansea City	2–0	Arsenal	Swansea
				Stadium: Vetch Field

17 October 1981 10	Arsenal	1–0	Manchester City	London
				Stadium: Highbury

24 October 1981 11	Ipswich Town	2–1	Arsenal	Ipswich
				Stadium: Portman Road

31 October 1981 12	Arsenal	1–0	Coventry City	London
				Stadium: Highbury

7 November 1981 13	Aston Villa	0–2	Arsenal	Birmingham
				Stadium: Villa Park

21 November 1981 14	Nottingham Forest	1–2	Arsenal	Nottingham
				Stadium: City Ground

28 November 1981 15	Arsenal	1–0	Everton	London
				Stadium: Highbury

5 December 1981 16	West Ham United	1–2	Arsenal	London
				Stadium: Upton Park

20 January 1982 17	Stoke City	0–1	Arsenal	Stoke on Trent
				Stadium: Victoria Ground

23 January 1982 18	Southampton	3–1	Arsenal	Southampton
				Stadium: The Dell

26 January 1982 19	Arsenal	0–0	Brighton & Hove Albion	London
				Stadium: Highbury

30 January 1982 20	Arsenal	1–0	Leeds United	London
				Stadium: Highbury

2 February 1982 21	Arsenal	2–1	Wolverhampton Wanderers	London
				Stadium: Highbury

6 February 1982 22	Sunderland	0–0	Arsenal	Sunderland
				Stadium: Roker Park

13 February 1982 23	Arsenal	1–0	Notts County	London
				Stadium: Highbury

16 February 1982 24	Arsenal	1–0	Middlesbrough	London
				Stadium: Highbury

20 February 1982 25	Manchester United	0–0	Arsenal	Manchester
				Stadium: Old Trafford

27 February 1982 26	Arsenal	0–2	Swansea City	London
				Stadium: Highbury

6 March 1982 27	Manchester City	0–0	Arsenal	Manchester
				Stadium: Maine Road

13 March 1982 28	Arsenal	1–0	Ipswich Town	London
				Stadium: Highbury

16 March 1982 29	Arsenal	2–2	West Bromwich Albion	London
				Stadium: Highbury

20 March 1982 30	Coventry City	1–0	Arsenal	Coventry
				Stadium: Highfield Road

27 March 1982 31	Arsenal	4–3	Aston Villa	London
				Stadium: Highbury

29 March 1982 32	Tottenham Hotspur	2–2	Arsenal	London
				Stadium: White Hart Lane

3 April 1982 33	Wolverhapton Wanderers	1–1	Arsenal	Wolverhampton
				Stadium: Molineux

10 April 1982 34	Brighton & Hove Albion	2–1	Arsenal	Brighton
				Stadium: Goldstone Ground

12 April 1982 35	Arsenal	1–3	Tottenham Hotspur	London
				Stadium: Highbury

17 April 1982 36	Arsenal	2–0	Nottingham Forest	London
				Stadium: Highbury

24 April 1982 37	Everton	2–1	Arsenal	Liverpool
				Stadium: Goodison Park

1 May 1982 38	Arsenal	2–0	West Ham United	London
				Stadium: Highbury

4 May 1982 39	Birmingham City	0–1	Arsenal	Birmingham
				Stadium: St Andrew's

8 May 1982 40	Middlesbrough	1–3	Arsenal	Middlesbrough
				Stadium: Ayresome Park

11 May 1982 41	Arsenal	1–1	Liverpool	London
				Stadium: Highbury

15 May 1982 42	Arsenal	4–1	Southampton	London
				Stadium: Highbury

=== Football League Cup ===
6 October 1981 Second round (1st Leg)	Sheffield United	1–0	Arsenal	Sheffield
				Stadium: Bramel Lane

27 October 1981 Second round (2nd Leg)	Arsenal	2–0 (2–1 agg.)	Sheffield United	London
				Stadium: Highbury

10 November 1981 Third round	Arsenal	1–0	Norwich City	London
				Stadium: Highbury

1 December 1981 Fourth round	Arsenal	0–0	Liverpool	London
				Stadium: Highbury

8 December 1981 Fourth round replay	Liverpool	3–0 (aet)	Arsenal	Liverpool
				Stadium: Anfield

=== FA Cup ===
Arsenal entered the FA Cup in the third round proper, in which they were drawn to face Tottenham Hotspur.

2 January 1982 Third round	Tottenham Hotspur	1–0	Arsenal	London
				Stadium: White Hart Lane

=== UEFA Cup ===
16 September 1981 First round (1st Leg)	Panathinaikos (Greece)	0–2	(England) Arsenal	Athens
				Stadium: Leoforos Stadium

30 September 1981 First round (2nd Leg)	Arsenal (England)	1–0 (4–0 agg.)	(Greece) Panathinaikos	London
				Stadium: Highbury

21 October 1981 Second round (1st Leg)	FC Winterslag (Belgium)	1–0	(England) Arsenal	Genk
				Stadium: Winterslag Stadium

3 November 1981 Second round (2nd Leg)	Arsenal (England)	2–1 (2–2 agg.)	(Belgium) FC Winterslag	London
				Stadium: Highbury

== Top scorers ==
=== First Division ===
- (England) Alan Sunderland 11
- (England) Graham Rix 9
- (England) Brian Talbot 7
