= 1982–83 Arsenal F.C. season =

English football club season

Arsenal F.C.
1982–83 season
- Chairman: Peter Hill-Wood
- Manager: Terry Neill
- First Division: 10th
- FA Cup: Semi-Final
- League Cup: Semi-Final
- UEFA Cup: First Round
- Top goalscorer: League: Tony Woodcock (14); All: Tony Woodcock (21)
Home colours	Away colours

The 1982–83 season was Arsenal Football Club's 57th consecutive season in the top flight of English Football, the Football League First Division. The club ended the season tenth, down from the fifth of the previous season, which had qualified them for the UEFA Cup. However, they went out first-round of the UEFA Cup and lost to Manchester United in the semifinals of both the FA Cup and League Cup.

New signing Tony Woodcock was the top scorer in both league and all competitions.

Pat Jennings became the first player in English football to appear in 1,000 first team matches.

== Season summary ==
Arsenal had earned a place in the UEFA Cup with a fifth-place finish despite having recently lost some key players. Manchester United had snapped-up Frank Stapleton in 1981, while Liam Brady had moved to Juventus a year earlier. Manager Terry Neill once again attempted to boost Arsenal's scoring potential, signing Tony Woodcock for £500,000 from FC. Koln after the 1982 World Cup and Stoke City top scorer Lee Chapman for the same price. While Woodcock went on to be Arsenal's top scorer in the league with 14 goals in 34 games, Chapman scored only 6 goals in 28 appearances and was sold to Sunderland for £100,000 in December 1983.

Arsenal finished in mid table at 10th after being in the lower reaches of the league for much of the season. Arsenal reached the semi-finals of the FA Cup and League Cup but on both occasions were beaten by Manchester United.

Arsenal's foray into the 1982-83 UEFA Cup was short as they lost 8–4 on aggregate to Spartak Moscow, including a 5–2 drubbing at Highbury. Arsenal fans demonstrated that they could appreciate fine football for what it was. As the final whistle sounded, the Arsenal fans were applauding the Russians off the pitch, the show of admiration was so remarkable that the Spartak players reappeared on the centre circle to acknowledge the crowd.

37-year-old Pat Jennings became the first player in English football to appear in 1,000 first team matches. He reached this milestone against West Bromwich Albion on 26 February 1983. Jennings found himself out of favour at Arsenal in 1982 as Scottish keeper George Wood assumed the No 1 spot in half of the games of the season.

Arsenal Chairman Denis Hill-Wood died at age 76. His son Peter Hill-Wood succeeded him in the position.

== Squad ==
Note: Flags indicate national team as defined under FIFA eligibility rules; some limited exceptions apply. Players may hold more than one non-FIFA nationality.

Pos.	Nation	Player
GK	SCO	George Wood
DF	ENG	John Hollins
DF	ENG	Kenny Sansom
MF	ENG	Brian Talbot
DF	IRL	David O'Leary
DF	ENG	Chris Whyte
MF	ENG	Stewart Robson
MF	ENG	Paul Davis
FW	ENG	Alan Sunderland
FW	ENG	Tony Woodcock
MF	ENG	Graham Rix

Pos.	Nation	Player
GK	NIR	Pat Jennings
MF	WAL	Peter Nicholas
FW	ENG	Lee Chapman
MF	YUG	Vladimir Petrovic
DF	IRL	John Devine
MF	ENG	Brian McDermott
DF	NIR	Colin Hill
DF	ENG	John Kay
MF	ENG	Danny O'Shea
FW	ENG	John Hawley
FW	ENG	Raphael Meade
MF	IRL	Paul Gorman

== Results ==
=== First Division ===
Pos	Team	Pld	W	D	L	GF	GA	GD	Pts
8	West Ham United	42	20	4	18	68	62	+6	64
9	Ipswich Town	42	15	13	14	64	50	+14	58
10	Arsenal	42	16	10	16	58	56	+2	58
11	West Bromwich Albion	42	15	12	15	51	49	+2	57
12	Southampton	42	15	12	15	54	58	−4	57

Source: World Football
Rules for classification: 1) Points; 2) Goal difference; 3) Goals scored

28 August 1982 1	Stoke City	2–1	Arsenal	Stoke-on-Trent
				Stadium: Victoria Ground

31 August 1982 2	Arsenal	1–1	Norwich City	London
				Stadium: Highbury

4 September 1982 3	Arsenal	0–2	Liverpool	London
				Stadium: Highbury

7 September 1982 4	Brighton & Hove Albion	1–0	Arsenal	Brighton
				Stadium: Goldstone Ground

11 September 1982 5	Coventry City	0–2	Arsenal	Coventry
				Stadium: Highfield Road

18 September 1982 6	Arsenal	2–0	Notts County	London
				Stadium: Highbury

25 September 1982 7	Manchester United	0–0	Arsenal	Manchester
				Stadium: Old Trafford

2 October 1982 8	Arsenal	2–3	West Ham United	London
				Stadium: Highbury

9 October 1982 9	Ipswich Town	0–1	Arsenal	Ipswich
				Stadium: Portman Road

16 October 1982 10	Arsenal	2–0	West Bromwich Albion	London
				Stadium: Highbury

23 October 1982 11	Nottingham Forest	3–0	Arsenal	Nottingham
				Stadium: City Ground

30 October 1982 12	Arsenal	0–0	Birmingham City	London
				Stadium: Highbury

6 November 1982 13	Luton Town	2–2	Arsenal	Luton
				Stadium: Kenilworth Road

13 November 1982 14	Arsenal	1–1	Everton	London
				Stadium: Highbury

20 November 1982 15	Swansea City	1–2	Arsenal	Swansea
				Stadium: Vetch Field

27 November 1982 16	Arsenal	2–4	Watford	London
				Stadium: Highbury

4 December 1982 17	Manchester City	2–1	Arsenal	Manchester
				Stadium: Maine Road

7 December 1982 18	Arsenal	2–1	Aston Villa	London
				Stadium: Highbury

18 December 1982 19	Sunderland	3–0	Arsenal	Sunderland
				Stadium: Roker Park

27 December 1982 20	Arsenal	2–0	Tottenham Hotspur	London
				Stadium: Highbury

28 December 1982 21	Southampton	2–2	Arsenal	Southampton
				Stadium: The Dell

1 January 1983 22	Arsenal	2–1	Swansea City	London
				Stadium: Highbury

3 January 1983 23	Liverpool	3–1	Arsenal	Liverpool
				Stadium: Anfield

15 January 1983 24	Arsenal	3–0	Stoke City	London
				Stadium: Highbury

22 January 1983 25	Notts County	1–0	Arsenal	Nottingham
				Stadium: Meadow Lane

5 February 1983 26	Arsenal	3–1	Brighton & Hove Albion	London
				Stadium: Highbury

26 February 1983 27	West Bromwich Albion	0–0	Arsenal	West Bromwich
				Stadium: The Hawthorns

5 March 1983 28	Arsenal	0–0	Nottingham Forest	London
				Stadium: Highbury

15 March 1983 29	Birmingham City	2–1	Arsenal	Birmingham
				Stadium: St Andrew's

19 March 1983 30	Arsenal	4–1	Luton Town	London
				Stadium: Highbury

22 March 1983 31	Arsenal	2–2	Ipswich Town	London
				Stadium: Highbury

26 March 1983 32	Everton	2–3	Arsenal	Liverpool
				Stadium: Goodison Park

2 April 1983 33	Arsenal	0–0	Southampton	London
				Stadium: Highbury

4 April 1983 34	Tottenham Hotspur	5–0	Arsenal	London
				Stadium: White Hart Lane

9 April 1983 35	Arsenal	2–1	Coventry City	London
				Stadium: Highbury

20 April 1983 36	Norwich City	3–1	Arsenal	Norwich
				Stadium: Carrow Road

23 April 1983 37	Arsenal	3–0	Manchester City	London
				Stadium: Highbury

30 April 1983 38	Watford	2–1	Arsenal	Watford
				Stadium: Vicarage Road

2 May 1983 39	Arsenal	3–0	Manchester United	London
				Stadium: Highbury

7 May 1983 40	Arsenal	0–1	Sunderland	London
				Stadium: Highbury

10 May 1983 41	West Ham United	1–3	Arsenal	London
				Stadium: Upton Park

14 May 1983 42	Aston Villa	2–1	Arsenal	Birmingham
				Stadium: Villa Park

=== Football League Cup ===
5 October 1982 Second round (1st Leg)	Arsenal	2–1	Cardiff City	London
				Stadium: Highbury

26 October 1982 Second round (2nd Leg)	Cardiff City	1–3 (2–5 agg.)	Arsenal	Cardiff
				Stadium: Ninian Park

9 November 1982 Third round	Everton	1–1	Arsenal	Liverpool
				Stadium: Goodison Park

23 November 1982 Third round replay	Arsenal	3–0	Everton	London
				Stadium: Highbury

30 November 1982 Fourth round	Arsenal	1–0	Huddersfield Town	London
				Stadium: Highbury

18 January 1983 Quarter-final	Arsenal	1–0	Sheffield Wednesday	London
				Stadium: Highbury

15 February 1983 Semi-final (1st Leg)	Arsenal	2–4	Manchester United	London
				Stadium: Highbury

22 February 1983 Semi-final (2nd Leg)	Manchester United	2–1 (6–3 agg.)	Arsenal	Manchester
				Stadium: Old Trafford

=== FA Cup ===
Arsenal entered the FA Cup in the third round proper, in which they were drawn to face Bolton Wanderers.

8 January 1983 Third round	Arsenal	2–1	Bolton Wanderers	London
				Stadium: Highbury

29 January 1983 Fourth round	Arsenal	1–1	Leeds United	London
				Stadium: Highbury

2 February 1983 Fourth round replay	Leeds United	1–1	Arsenal	Leeds
				Stadium: Elland Road

9 February 1983 Fourth round 2nd replay	Arsenal	2–1	Leeds United	London
				Stadium: Highbury

19 February 1983 Fifth round	Middlesbrough	1–1	Arsenal	Middlesbrough
				Stadium: Ayresome Park

28 February 1983 Fifth round replay	Arsenal	3–2	Middlesbrough	London
				Stadium: Highbury

12 March 1983 Sixth round	Arsenal	2–0	Aston Villa	London
	Woodcock; Petrović			Stadium: Highbury

16 April 1983 Semi-final	Manchester United	2–1	Arsenal	Birmingham
	B. Robson 49'; Whiteside 70'		Woodcock 36'	Stadium: Villa Park; Attendance: 46,535

=== UEFA Cup ===
15 September 1982 First round (1st Leg)	Spartak Moscow (Soviet Union)	3–2	(England) Arsenal	Moscow
				Stadium: Central Lenin Stadium

29 September 1982 First round (2nd Leg)	Arsenal (England)	2–5 (4–8 agg.)	(Soviet Union) Spartak Moscow	London
				Stadium: Highbury

== Top scorers ==
=== First Division ===
- (England) Tony Woodcock 14
- (England) Brian Talbot 9
- (England) Graham Rix 6
- (England) Alan Sunderland 6
