= 1980–81 Arsenal F.C. season =

English football club season

Arsenal F.C.
1980–81 season
- Chairman: Denis Hill-Wood
- Manager: Terry Neill
- First Division: 3rd
- FA Cup: Third round
- League Cup: Fourth round
- Top goalscorer: League: Frank Stapleton (14); All: Frank Stapleton (16)
- Highest home attendance: 54,045 vs Tottenham Hotspur (30 August 1980)
- Lowest home attendance: 17,431 vs Birmingham City (31 March 1981)
Home colours	Away colours

The 1980–81 season was Arsenal Football Club's 55th consecutive season in the top flight of English football. The club ended their campaign third in the Football League First Division, despite a dismal start. Manager Terry Neill was attempting to follow up on finalist performances in both the FA Cup and the European Cup Winner's Cup during the previous season.

In the transfer business, Arsenal lost first-team regular Liam Brady to Juventus. Arsenal signed 19-year-old Clive Allen from Queens Park Rangers as a forward for £1.250.000 million, a club transfer record. However, Allen failed to make a competitive match appearance for the club and was instead moved-on to Crystal Palace in a swap deal for Kenny Sanson. Peter Nicholas also joined the club in March.

Frank Stapleton was Arsenal's top scorer in both the league and in all competitions. He left Arsenal for Manchester United at the end of the season.

Throughout the season, Arsenal went undefeated at Highbury in the League.

== Season summary ==
After the gruelling and heart breaking 70-match season in 1979/80, it was clear that Arsenal needed reinforcements if they wanted to progress to the next level, and it was essential that the money earned from their cup runs should be invested in the squad. Arsenal only received the maximum £600,000 allowed by UEFA and the EEC for international transfers when Liam Brady went to Juventus.

With the impending departure of Brady, Arsenal fans were in need of some positives, so the signing of Clive Allen at least provided a glimmer of hope. The 19-year-old centre forward was one of the most exciting prospects in the English game. After scoring 28 goals for QPR in the Second Division in 1979/80 Arsenal signed the teenager to provide competition and assistance to Frank Stapleton and Alan Sunderland. Arsenal had smashed their transfer record, spending £1.25 million on Allen, completely blitzing their previous high of £440,000 on Brian Talbot in the process and making Allen the first £1 million teenager.

Clive Allen's Arsenal career was over after just 62 days at the club. Allen, who played just three pre-season games for Arsenal, headed to Crystal Palace along with goalkeeper Paul Barron. In return England defender Kenny Sansom arrived at Highbury.

Arsenal also bought defensive midfielder Peter Nicholas from Crystal Palace in March 1981. He joined Arsenal when the club had won a grand total of three of the last 14 games played. After that Arsenal played nine, and only dropped two points and Nicholas didn’t play on the losing side. When he joined Arsenal they were 7th, eleven points behind the leaders.

By the end of the season Arsenal were 3rd, seven points behind the leaders, and qualified for the UEFA Cup. Arsenal had gone through the whole season undefeated at Highbury in the League and were undefeated in their final nine matches.

== Pre-season and friendlies ==
Date	Opponents	Venue	Result	Score F–A	Scorers	Attendance
1 August 1980	Rangers	A	L	0–2		27,000
3 August 1980	Aberdeen	A	L	1–2	Stapleton	
9 August 1980	Vasco da Gama	N	L	1–2	Talbot	
10 August 1980	Partizan Belgrade	A	D	0–0		

== Results ==
=== First Division ===
Pos	Team	Pld	W	D	L	GF	GA	GD	Pts	Qualification or relegation
1	Aston Villa (C)	42	26	8	8	72	40	+32	60	Qualification for the European Cup first round
2	Ipswich Town	42	23	10	9	77	43	+34	56	Qualification for the UEFA Cup first round
3	Arsenal	42	19	15	8	61	45	+16	53	Qualification for the UEFA Cup first round
4	West Bromwich Albion	42	20	12	10	60	42	+18	52	Qualification for the UEFA Cup first round
5	Liverpool	42	17	17	8	62	42	+20	51	Qualification for the European Cup first round (Note: Liverpool qualified for the European Cup first round as the 1980–81 European Cup winners.)

Source: World Football
Rules for classification: 1) Points; 2) Goal difference; 3) Goals scored
(C) Champions
Notes:

16 August 1980 1	West Bromwich Albion	0–1	Arsenal	West Bromwich
				Stadium: The Hawthorns

19 August 1980 2	Arsenal	1–1	Southampton	London
				Stadium: Highbury

23 August 1980 3	Coventry City	3–1	Arsenal	Coventry
				Stadium: Highfield Road

30 August 1980 4	Arsenal	2–0	Tottenham Hotspur	London
				Stadium: Highbury

6 September 1980 5	Manchester City	1–1	Arsenal	Manchester
				Stadium: Maine Road

13 September 1980 6	Arsenal	2–0	Stoke City	London
				Stadium: Highbury

20 September 1980 7	Middlesbrough	2–1	Arsenal	Middlesbrough
				Stadium: Ayresome Park

27 September 1980 8	Arsenal	1–0	Nottingham Forest	London
				Stadium: Highbury

4 October 1980 9	Arsenal	1–0	Leicester City	London
				Stadium: Highbury

7 October 1980 10	Birmingham City	3–1	Arsenal	Birmingham
				Stadium: St Andrew's

11 October 1980 11	Manchester United	0–0	Arsenal	Manchester
				Stadium: Old Trafford

18 October 1980 12	Arsenal	2–2	Sunderland	London
				Stadium: Highbury

21 October 1980 13	Arsenal	3–1	Norwich City	London
				Stadium: Highbury

25 October 1980 14	Liverpool	1–1	Arsenal	Liverpool
				Stadium: Anfield

1 November 1980 15	Arsenal	2–0	Brighton & Hove Albion	London
				Stadium: Highbury

8 November 1980 16	Leeds United	0–5	Arsenal	Leeds
				Stadium: Elland Road

11 November 1980 17	Southampton	3–1	Arsenal	Southampton
				Stadium: The Dell

15 November 1980 18	Arsenal	2–2	West Bromwich Albion	London
				Stadium: Highbury

22 November 1980 19	Arsenal	2–1	Everton	London
				Stadium: Highbury

29 November 1980 20	Aston Villa	1–1	Arsenal	Birmingham
				Stadium: Villa Park

6 December 1980 21	Arsenal	1–1	Wolverhampton Wanderers	London
				Stadium: Highbury

13 December 1980 22	Sunderland	2–0	Arsenal	Sunderland
				Stadium: Roker Park

20 December 1980 23	Arsenal	2–1	Manchester United	London
				Stadium: Highbury

26 December 1980 24	Crystal Palace	2–2	Arsenal	London
				Stadium: Selhurst Park

27 December 1980 25	Arsenal	1–1	Ipswich Town	London
				Stadium: Highbury

10 January 1981 26	Everton	1–2	Arsenal	Liverpool
				Stadium: Goodison Park

17 January 1981 27	Tottenham Hotspur	2–0	Arsenal	London
				Stadium: White Hart Lane

31 January 1981 28	Arsenal	2–2	Coventry City	London
				Stadium: Highbury

7 February 1981 29	Stoke City	1–1	Arsenal	Stoke on Trent
				Stadium: Victoria Ground

21 February 1981 30	Nottingham Forest	3–1	Arsenal	Nottingham
				Stadium: City Ground

24 February 1981 31	Arsenal	2–0	Manchester City	London
				Stadium: Highbury

28 February 1981 32	Arsenal	2–2	Middlesbrough	London
				Stadium: Highbury

7 March 1981 33	Leicester City	1–0	Arsenal	Leicester
				Stadium: Filbert Street

21 March 1981 34	Norwich City	1–1	Arsenal	Norwich
				Stadium: Carrow Road

28 March 1981 35	Arsenal	1–0	Liverpool	London
				Stadium: Highbury

31 March 1981 36	Arsenal	2–1	Birmingham City	London
				Stadium: Highbury

4 April 1981 37	Brighton & Hove Albion	0–1	Arsenal	Brighton
				Stadium: Goldstone Ground

11 April 1981 38	Arsenal	0–0	Leeds United	London
				Stadium: Highbury

18 April 1981 39	Ipswich Town	0–2	Arsenal	Ipswich
				Stadium: Portman Road

20 April 1981 40	Arsenal	3–2	Crystal Palace	London
				Stadium: Highbury

25 April 1981 41	Wolverhampton Wanderers	1–2	Arsenal	Wolverhampton
				Stadium: Molineux Stadium

2 May 1981 42	Arsenal	2–0	Aston Villa	London
				Stadium: Highbury

=== Football League Cup ===
26 August 1980 Second round (1st Leg)	Swansea City	1–1	Arsenal	Swansea
				Stadium: Vetch Field

2 September 1980 Second round (2nd Leg)	Arsenal	3–1 (4–2 agg.)	Swansea City	London
				Stadium: Highbury

22 September 1980 Third round	Stockport County	1–3	Arsenal	Stockport
				Stadium: Edgeley Park

4 November 1980 Fourth round	Tottenham Hotspur	1–0	Arsenal	London
	Ardiles 25'			Stadium: White Hart Lane

=== FA Cup ===
Arsenal entered the FA Cup in the third round proper, in which they were drawn to face Everton.

3 January 1981 Third round	Everton	2–0	Arsenal	Liverpool
				Stadium: Goodison Park

== Squad ==
Note: Flags indicate national team as defined under FIFA eligibility rules; some limited exceptions apply. Players may hold more than one non-FIFA nationality.

Pos.	Nation	Player
GK	NIR	Pat Jennings
DF	IRL	John Devine
DF	ENG	Kenny Sansom
MF	ENG	Brian Talbot
DF	IRL	David O'Leary
DF	SCO	Willie Young
MF	ENG	John Hollins
FW	ENG	Alan Sunderland
FW	IRL	Frank Stapleton
MF	ENG	Steve Gatting
MF	ENG	Graham Rix

Pos.	Nation	Player
DF	ENG	Steve Walford
MF	ENG	Brian McDermott
GK	SCO	George Wood
MF	ENG	David Price
MF	ENG	Paul Davis
MF	WAL	Peter Nicholas
FW	ENG	Paul Vaessen
DF	NIR	Pat Rice
DF	NIR	Sammy Nelson

== Top scorers ==
=== First Division ===
- (Republic of Ireland) Frank Stapleton 14
- (England) Alan Sunderland 7
- (England) Brian Talbot 7
