= 1979 FA Charity Shield =

- The match programme cover
Arsenal	Liverpool
1	3
- Date: 11 August 1979
- Venue: Wembley Stadium, London
- Referee: George Courtney (County Durham)
- Attendance: 92,800
- Weather: 20 °C (68 °F)

The 1979 FA Charity Shield was the 57th Charity Shield, an annual English football match played between the winners of the previous season's Football League and FA Cup. It was held at Wembley Stadium on 11 August 1979. The match was contested by Liverpool, champions of the 1978–79 Football League and Arsenal, who beat Manchester United in the final of the 1978–79 FA Cup. Watched by a crowd of 92,800, Liverpool won the match 3–1.

This was Arsenal's tenth Charity Shield appearance and Liverpool's ninth. Arsenal made no changes to the first team which played in the FA Cup Final the previous season, whereas for Liverpool new signing Avi Cohen started on the bench. In the match Liverpool took the lead in the 38th minute when Terry McDermott scored past goalkeeper Pat Jennings. They extended their lead through Kenny Dalglish in the 63rd minute before McDermott added his second two minutes later. Alan Sunderland scored a consolation for Arsenal late on.

== Background and pre-match ==
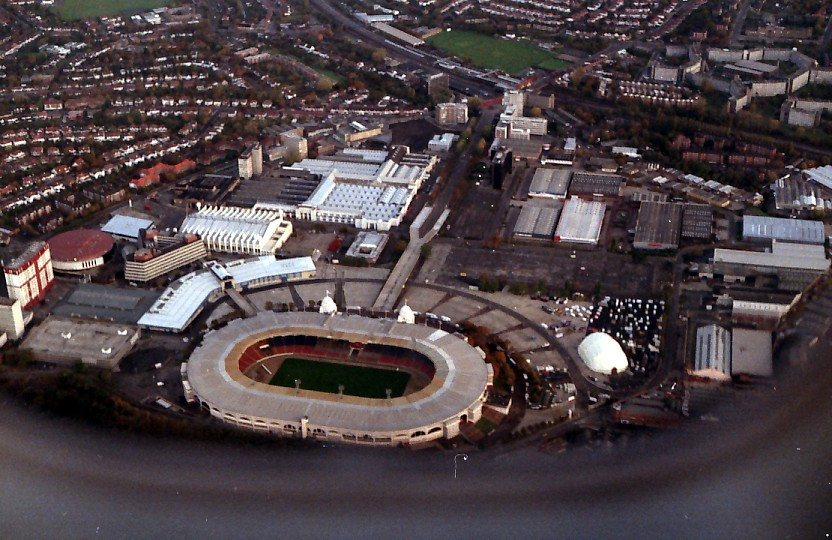
Wembley Stadium was the venue for the Charity Shield.

The FA Charity Shield was founded in 1908 as a successor to the Sheriff of London Charity Shield. It was a contest between the respective champions of the Football League and Southern League, and then by 1913 teams of amateur and professional players. In 1921, it was played by the Football League champions and FA Cup winners for the first time. This was the sixth year that Wembley Stadium played host to the Shield.

Liverpool qualified for the 1979 FA Charity Shield as winners of the previous season's First Division. Under manager Bob Paisley, the team amassed a then-record points total of 68 and conceded the fewest goals in a 42-game Football League season with 16. The other Charity Shield place went to Arsenal who beat Manchester United to win the final of the 1978–79 FA Cup. Arsenal led the game 2–0, but conceded twice late into the match before retaking the lead in the 89th minute; the final score was 3–2. The game is referred to as the "Five-minute final" as three goals were scored in that time frame.

This was Arsenal's first appearance in the Charity Shield in 26 years; prior to the game they had won seven Shields (1930, 1931, 1933, 1934, 1938, 1948 and 1953), and lost two (1935, 1936). Liverpool had won three previous Shields outright (1966, 1974, 1976), shared two with Manchester United (1965 and 1977) and one apiece with West Ham United (1964). The club lost one Shield contest – against Leicester City in 1971. Before the match Paisley told reporters, "Basically it is a conditioning game, part of the process of getting the players fit".

== Match ==
Arsenal organised themselves similarly to their opponents and named an unchanged team from the one which won the FA Cup. Liverpool employed a traditional 4–4–2 formation, with David Johnson playing alongside Kenny Dalglish up front. Defender Avi Cohen was named on the substitutes' bench, whereas Frank McGarvey – signed from St Mirren in the close season – was omitted from the matchday squad.

=== Summary ===
Liverpool dominated the opening exchanges, but struggled to create clear-cut chances. They almost went a goal behind when Frank Stapleton's header forced goalkeeper Ray Clemence into action. Seven minutes before the interval, Terry McDermott scored for Liverpool. The midfielder collected a pass from Ray Kennedy who surged through the centre, turned left and from outside the penalty area struck the ball low into the bottom left-hand corner. Arsenal began the second half with more vigour, but struggled to suppress Liverpool's attacks. Alan Kennedy found space to shoot after a one-two with Ray, but his effort went over the post. Arsenal were forced to make a substitution around the hour mark after Sammy Nelson collided with McDermott and was concussed; Willie Young replaced him. Liverpool extended their lead minutes later. Alan Hansen intercepted an Arsenal attack, strode forward and passed the ball to Dalglish. The striker approached the penalty area, cut inside Steve Walford and curled the ball into the right-hand corner. John Hollins came on for David Price, at which point Liverpool scored their third. Dalglish dispossessed Liam Brady, but tripped himself in the process. Johnson collected the ball and played it back to Dalglish, who charged forward and sprayed a pass towards McDermott, the furthest forward player on the right. The midfielder's shot went under the legs of Pat Jennings and into the goal. Alan Sunderland scored a late goal for Arsenal having combined well with Stapleton. This did not dampen the spirits of the Liverpool spectators, who chanted, "What's it like to be outclassed?" and, "Why are we so great?" during the course of the 90 minutes.

=== Details ===
11 August 1979
15:00 BST

Arsenal	1–3	Liverpool
Sunderland 88'		McDermott 38', 65'; Dalglish 63'

Wembley Stadium, London
Attendance: 92,800
Referee: George Courtney (County Durham)

Arsenal	Liverpool

GK	1	(Northern Ireland) Pat Jennings
DF	2	(Northern Ireland) Pat Rice (c)
DF	3	(Northern Ireland) Sammy Nelson	Substituted off
MF	4	(England) Brian Talbot
DF	5	(Republic of Ireland) David O'Leary
DF	6	(England) Steve Walford
MF	7	(Republic of Ireland) Liam Brady
FW	8	(England) Alan Sunderland
FW	9	(Republic of Ireland) Frank Stapleton
MF	10	(England) David Price	Substituted off
MF	11	(England) Graham Rix
Substitutes:
MF	12	(England) John Hollins	Substituted on
FW	13	(England) Paul Vaessen
DF	14	(England) Steve Gatting
DF	15	(Scotland) Willie Young	Substituted on
GK	16	(England) Paul Barron
Manager:
(Northern Ireland) Terry Neill

GK	1	(England) Ray Clemence
DF	2	(England) Phil Neal
DF	3	(England) Alan Kennedy
DF	4	(England) Phil Thompson (c)
MF	5	(England) Ray Kennedy
DF	6	(Scotland) Alan Hansen
FW	7	(Scotland) Kenny Dalglish
MF	8	(England) Jimmy Case
FW	9	(England) David Johnson
MF	10	(England) Terry McDermott
MF	11	(Scotland) Graeme Souness
Substitutes:
MF	12	(Republic of Ireland) Steve Heighway
GK	13	(England) Steve Ogrizovic
FW	14	(England) David Fairclough
DF	15	(Israel) Avi Cohen
MF	16	(England) Sammy Lee
Manager:
(England) Bob Paisley

Match rules

- 90 minutes, no extra time
- Five named substitutes
- Maximum of three substitutions

== Post-match ==
Liverpool's performance was greeted with applause from both sets of supporters as Phil Thompson led his team up to the Royal Box to receive the Charity Shield. Paisley was delighted with the manner of his team's win and quipped, "I am just sorry we didn't get two points for it!" He praised the Wembley surface and said of McDermott's first goal "[It] captured what we are looking for – the run, the control and the finish were perfect." Arsenal manager Terry Neill described the match as a "great advertisement for football" and felt his side contributed greatly in periods. Of his opponents, he said: "Liverpool are a smashing side and I don't expect to meet anyone better this season." Indeed, Liverpool went on to retain the First Division title, withstanding pressure from Manchester United and ending their league campaign on 60 points. Arsenal finished three places behind in fourth, and reached the finals of the FA Cup and UEFA Cup Winners' Cup, only to end the season empty-handed.

== See also ==
- 1979–80 Football League
- 1979–80 FA Cup
