= 1979–80 Arsenal F.C. season =

English football club season

Arsenal F.C.
1979–80 season
- Chairman: Denis Hill-Wood
- Manager: Terry Neill
- First Division: 4th
- FA Cup: Finalists
- League Cup: Fifth round
- European Cup Winners' Cup: Finalists
- Charity Shield: Runners-up
- Top goalscorer: League: Alan Sunderland/Frank Stapleton (14); All: Alan Sunderland (29)
| Home colours | Away colours |

The 1979–80 season was Arsenal Football Club's 54th consecutive season in the Football League First Division. The club finished the season in fourth after struggling with scoring goals and a congested schedule at the end of the season.

Arsenal reached the finals in the 1979-80 FA Cup and the 1979-80 European Cup Winner's Cup but failed to win either. After winning the FA Cup the previous season, Arsenal would not reach another cup final until 1987.

Alan Sunderland was the top scorer, with 14 goals in the league. Arsenal scored 52 goals in 42 league matches.

Liam Brady left the team at the end of the season for Juventus.

== Season summary ==
Prior to the season's beginning, Liam Brady announced that he would leave Highbury when his contract ran out at the end of the season. Despite an offer of increased wages and security from Arsenal, Brady wanted to experience European competition. Arsenal made few changes from the previous season in their squad, only bringing in midfielder John Hollins. Alan Hudson left for Seattle Sounders.

The season started with a 3-1 defeat to Liverpool at Wembley in the Charity Shield in August 1979. Arsenal finished the league season in fourth place in the First Division.

Arsenal reached the finals in two major cup competitions: the 1979-80 FA Cup and the 1979-80 European Cup Winner's Cup. Arsenal lost to Swindon in the quarterfinals of the League Cup, preventing them from progressing further. In the FA Cup, Arsenal faced Cardiff, Brighton, Bolton, and Watford (playing five replays in five rounds) before playing Liverpool in the semifinal. The semi-final fixtures against Juventus and Liverpool sandwiched each other around league games, making for a difficult schedule. Arsenal vs Liverpool went to a fourth match, the series concluding just nine games before the FA Cup final. Arsenal won the fourth game thanks to Brian Talbot's sole goal. Arsenal then faced West Ham in the final, in which Paul Allen became the youngest player to appear in a FA Cup final. Fatigue hit Arsenal hard with Talbot collapsing on the bus on the way home.

In the Cup Winners Cup, Arsenal began their campaign with a win over Fenerbahce before being paired with Magdeburg. They then beat IFK Göteborg 5-0 in the semi-finals before facing Juventus in the semifinal. In the second leg of the semifinal, Arsenal beat Juventus thanks to a header by 18-year old Paul Vaessen, making Arsenal the first British team to beat Juventus on their home soil. Arsenal played in the final against Valencia just four days after their loss in the FA Cup final. The game was decided by penalty shootout. Valencia won 5-4, as Valencia's goalkeeper blocked both Liam Brady's and Graham Rix's shots. Arsenal had played fifteen matches in 45 days prior.

In league performance, Arsenal struggled with consistency. At home, Arsenal won only eight of their games, drawing ten. Playing in a counter-attacking style, Arsenal did win ten of their away games. Cup competition late into the season caused fixture congestion and fatigue among Arsenal players. Due to such congestion, Arsenal even asked to rearrange the schedule for the North London Derby. Tottenham refused, but Arsenal won away at White Hart Lane - fielding six reserves! Although Arsenal had failed to qualify for European competition through their cup fixtures, they could qualify based on league position if they won their last two games. However, after winning their first game against Wolves, Arsenal lost 5-0 to Middlesbrough in their 50th game in the season, losing their position in European competition.

With fifth placed Nottingham Forest qualifying for the following year's European Cup as holders after winning it again at the end of May and sixth placed Wolverhampton Wanderers having qualified for the UEFA Cup as winners of the League Cup, Arsenal were the only team in the top six not to qualify for Europe. It is a record that still stands. No team has played a 70-match season before or since in England. Arsenal played 70 games throughout the course of the 1979/80, including 27 Cup games, of which two were Cup Finals against West Ham and Valencia; the two happening within the space of five days.

Despite finishing in fourth place in the league, they only scored 52 goals in 42 matches. Arsenal drew sixteen games throughout the league season, ten of them at home. In cup competitions, they drew a total of ten matches. Alan Sunderland finished the season as top goalscorer with 29, but only 14 of these came in the league.

== Squad ==
Note: Flags indicate national team as defined under FIFA eligibility rules; some limited exceptions apply. Players may hold more than one non-FIFA nationality.

| Pos. | Nation | Player |
|---|---|---|
| GK | NIR | Pat Jennings |
| DF | NIR | Pat Rice |
| DF | NIR | Sammy Nelson |
| MF | ENG | Brian Talbot |
| DF | IRL | David O'Leary |
| DF | SCO | Willie Young |
| MF | IRL | Liam Brady |
| FW | ENG | Alan Sunderland |
| FW | IRL | Frank Stapleton |
| MF | ENG | John Hollins |
| MF | ENG | Graham Rix |

| Pos. | Nation | Player |
|---|---|---|
| MF | ENG | David Price |
| DF | IRL | John Devine |
| DF | ENG | Steve Walford |
| DF | ENG | Steve Gatting |
| FW | ENG | Paul Vaessen |
| GK | ENG | Paul Barron |
| MF | ENG | Paul Davis |
| MF | ENG | Brian McDermott |

== Results ==
=== FA Charity Shield ===
As FA Cup winners, Arsenal contested the 1979 FA Charity Shield against League champions Liverpool. Liverpool won the match on 11 August 1979 by 3–1.

| 11 August 1979 FA Charity Shield | Liverpool | 3–1 | Arsenal | London |
| | McDermott 38', 65'; Dalglish 63' | | Sunderland 88' | Stadium: Wembley Stadium; Attendance: 92,800 |

=== First Division ===
| Pos | Team | Pld | W | D | L | GF | GA | GD | Pts | Qualification or relegation |
|---|---|---|---|---|---|---|---|---|---|---|
| 2 | Manchester United | 42 | 24 | 10 | 8 | 65 | 35 | +30 | 58 | Qualification for the UEFA Cup first round |
| 3 | Ipswich Town | 42 | 22 | 9 | 11 | 68 | 39 | +29 | 53 | Qualification for the UEFA Cup first round |
| 4 | Arsenal | 42 | 18 | 16 | 8 | 52 | 36 | +16 | 52 | |
| 5 | Nottingham Forest | 42 | 20 | 8 | 14 | 63 | 43 | +20 | 48 | Qualification for the European Cup first round (Note: Nottingham Forest qualified for the European Cup first round as the 1979–80 European Cup winners.) |
| 6 | Wolverhampton Wanderers | 42 | 19 | 9 | 14 | 58 | 47 | +11 | 47 | Qualification for the UEFA Cup first round (Note: Wolverhampton Wanderers qualified for the UEFA Cup as the 1979–80 Football League Cup winners.) |

Source: World Football
Rules for classification: 1) Points; 2) Goal difference; 3) Goals scored
Notes:

| 18 August 1979 1 | Brighton & Hove Albion | 0–4 | Arsenal | Brighton |
| | | | Brady (Pen), Stapleton, Sunderland (2) | Stadium: Goldstone Ground |

| 21 August 1979 2 | Arsenal | 0–2 | Ipswich Town | London |
| | | | | Stadium: Highbury |

| 25 August 1979 3 | Arsenal | 0–0 | Manchester United | London |
| | | | | Stadium: Highbury |

| 1 September 1979 4 | Leeds United | 1–1 | Arsenal | Leeds |
| | | | Stapleton | Stadium: Elland Road |

| 8 September 1979 5 | Derby County | 3–2 | Arsenal | Derby |
| | | | Stapleton, Sunderland | Stadium: Baseball Ground |

| 15 September 1979 6 | Arsenal | 2–0 | Middlesbrough | London |
| | Stapleton, Sunderland | | | Stadium: Highbury |

| 22 September 1979 7 | Aston Villa | 0–0 | Arsenal | Birmingham |
| | | | | Stadium: Villa Park |

| 29 September 1979 8 | Arsenal | 2–3 | Wolverhampton Wanderers | London |
| | Hollins, Stapleton | | | Stadium: Highbury |

| 6 October 1979 9 | Arsenal | 0–0 | Manchester City | London |
| | | | | Stadium: Highbury |

| 9 October 1979 10 | Ipswich Town | 1–2 | Arsenal | Ipswich |
| | | | Rix, Sunderland | Stadium: Portman Road |

| 13 October 1979 11 | Bolton Wanderers | 0–0 | Arsenal | Bolton |
| | | | | Stadium: Burnden Park |

| 20 October 1979 12 | Arsenal | 0–0 | Stoke City | London |
| | | | | Stadium: Highbury |

| 27 October 1979 13 | Bristol City | 0–1 | Arsenal | Bristol |
| | | | Sunderland | Stadium: Ashton Gate |

| 3 November 1979 14 | Arsenal | 3–0 | Brighton & Hove Albion | London |
| | Brady(Pen), Rix, Sunderland | | | Stadium: Highbury |

| 10 November 1979 15 | Crystal Palace | 1–0 | Arsenal | London |
| | | | | Stadium: Selhurst Park |

| 17 November 1979 16 | Arsenal | 2–0 | Everton | London |
| | Stapleton(2) | | | Stadium: Highbury |

| 24 November 1979 17 | Arsenal | 0–0 | Liverpool | London |
| | | | | Stadium: Highbury |

| 1 December 1979 18 | Nottingham Forest | 1–1 | Arsenal | Nottingham |
| | Stapleton | | | Stadium: City Ground |

| 8 December 1979 19 | Arsenal | 3–1 | Coventry City | London |
| | O'Leary, Stapleton, Sunderland | | | Stadium: Highbury |

| 15 December 1979 20 | West Bromwich Albion | 2–2 | Arsenal | West Bromwich |
| | | | Nelson, Stapleton | Stadium: The Hawthorns |

| 21 December 1979 21 | Arsenal | 1–1 | Norwich City | London |
| | Stapleton | | | Stadium: Highbury |

| 26 December 1979 22 | Arsenal | 1–0 | Tottenham Hotspur | London |
| | Sunderland | | | Stadium: Highbury |

| 29 December 1979 23 | Manchester United | 3–0 | Arsenal | Manchester |
| | | | | Stadium: Old Trafford |

| 1 January 1980 24 | Southampton | 0–1 | Arsenal | Southampton |
| | | | Young | Stadium: The Dell |

| 12 January 1980 25 | Arsenal | 0–1 | Leeds United | London |
| | | | | Stadium: Highbury |

| 19 January 1980 26 | Arsenal | 2–0 | Derby County | London |
| | Brady (Pen), Young | | | Stadium: Highbury |

| 9 February 1980 27 | Arsenal | 3–1 | Aston Villa | London |
| | Rix, Sunderland (2) | | | Stadium: Highbury |

| 23 February 1980 28 | Arsenal | 2–0 | Bolton Wanderers | London |
| | Stapleton, Young | | | Stadium: Highbury |

| 1 March 1980 29 | Stoke City | 2–3 | Arsenal | Stoke on Trent |
| | | | Brady, Price, Sunderland | Stadium: Victoria Ground |

| 11 March 1980 30 | Arsenal | 0–0 | Bristol City | London |
| | | | | Stadium: Highbury |

| 15 March 1980 31 | Manchester City | 0–3 | Arsenal | Manchester |
| | | | Brady (Pen), Brady, Stapleton | Stadium: Maine Road |

| 22 March 1980 32 | Arsenal | 1–1 | Crystal Palace | London |
| | Brady | | | Stadium: Highbury |

| 28 March 1980 33 | Everton | 0–1 | Arsenal | Liverpool |
| | | | Gatting | Stadium: Goodison Park |

| 2 April 1980 34 | Norwich City | 2–1 | Arsenal | Norwich |
| | | | Rix | Stadium: Carrow Road |

| 5 April 1980 35 | Arsenal | 1–1 | Southampton | London |
| | Sunderland | | | Stadium: Highbury |

| 7 April 1980 36 | Tottenham Hotspur | 1–2 | Arsenal | London |
| | | | Vaessen, Sunderland | Stadium: White Hart Lane |

| 19 April 1980 37 | Liverpool | 1–1 | Arsenal | Liverpool |
| | | | Talbot | Stadium: Anfield |

| 26 April 1980 38 | Arsenal | 1–1 | West Bromwich Albion | London |
| | Stapleton | | | Stadium: Highbury |

| 3 May 1980 39 | Coventry City | 0–1 | Arsenal | Coventry |
| | | | Vaessen | Stadium: Highfield Road |

| 5 May 1980 40 | Arsenal | 0–0 | Nottingham Forest | London |
| | | | | Stadium: Highbury |

| 16 May 1980 41 | Wolverhampton Wanderers | 1–2 | Arsenal | Wolverhampton |
| | | | Stapleton, Walford | Stadium: Molineux |

| 19 May 1980 42 | Middlesbrough | 5–0 | Arsenal | Middlesbrough |
| | | | | Stadium: Ayresome Park |

=== Football League Cup ===
| 29 August 1979 Second round (1st Leg) | Leeds United | 1–1 | Arsenal | Leeds |
| | | | | Stadium: Elland Road |

| 4 September 1979 Second round (2nd Leg) | Arsenal | 7–0 (8–1 agg.) | Leeds United | London |
| | | | | Stadium: Highbury |

| 25 September 1979 Third round | Arsenal | 1–0 | Southampton | London |
| | | | | Stadium: Highbury |

| 30 October 1979 Fourth round | Brighton & Hove Albion | 0–0 | Arsenal | Brighton |
| | | | | Stadium: Goldstone Ground |

| 13 November 1979 Fourth round replay | Arsenal | 4–0 | Brighton & Hove Albion | London |
| | | | | Stadium: Highbury |

| 4 December 1979 Fifth round | Arsenal | 1–1 | Swindon Town | London |
| | | | | Stadium: Highbury |

| 11 December 1979 Fifth round replay | Swindon Town | 4–3 (aet) | Arsenal | Swindon |
| | | | | Stadium: County Ground |

=== FA Cup ===
Arsenal entered the FA Cup in the third round proper, in which they were drawn to face Cardiff City.

| 5 January 1980 Third round | Cardiff City | 0–0 | Arsenal | Cardiff |
| | | | | Stadium: Ninian Park |

| 8 January 1980 Third round replay | Arsenal | 2–1 | Cardiff City | London |
| | | | | Stadium: Highbury |

| 26 January 1980 Fourth round | Arsenal | 2–0 | Brighton & Hove Albion | London |
| | | | | Stadium: Highbury |

| 16 February 1980 Fifth round | Bolton Wanderers | 1–1 | Arsenal | Bolton |
| | | | | Stadium: Burnden Park |

| 19 February 1980 Fifth round replay | Arsenal | 3–0 | Bolton Wanderers | London |
| | | | | Stadium: Highbury |

| 8 March 1980 Sixth round | Watford | 1–2 | Arsenal | London |
| | | | | Stadium: Vicarage Road |

| 12 April 1980 Semi-Final | Arsenal | 0–0 (aet) | Liverpool | Sheffield |
| | | | | Stadium: Hillsborough Stadium |

| 16 April 1980 Semi-Final replay | Arsenal | 1–1 (aet) | Liverpool | Birmingham |
| | | | | Stadium: Villa Park |

| 28 April 1980 Semi-Final 2nd replay | Arsenal | 1–1 (aet) | Liverpool | Sheffield |
| | | | | Stadium: Hillsborough Stadium |

| 1 May 1980 Semi-Final 3rd replay | Arsenal | 1–0 | Liverpool | Coventry |
| | | | | Stadium: Highfield Road |

| 10 May 1980 Final | Arsenal | 0–1 | West Ham United | London |
| | | | | Stadium: Wembley Stadium |

=== European Cup Winners' Cup ===
| 19 September 1979 First round (1st Leg) | Arsenal (England) | 2–0 | (Turkey) Fenerbahçe S.K. | London |
| | | | | Stadium: Highbury |

| 3 October 1979 First round (2nd Leg) | Fenerbahçe S.K. (Turkey) | 0–0 (0–2 agg.) | (England) Arsenal | Istanbul |
| | | | | Stadium: Şükrü Saracoğlu Stadium |

| 24 October 1979 Second round (1st Leg) | Arsenal (England) | 2–1 | (East Germany) Magdeburg | London |
| | | | | Stadium: Highbury |

| 7 November 1979 Second round (2nd Leg) | Magdeburg (East Germany) | 2–2 (3–4 agg.) | (England) Arsenal | Magdeburg |
| | | | | Stadium: Ernst Grube Stadium |

| 5 March 1980 Quarter-Final (1st Leg) | Arsenal (England) | 5–1 | (Sweden) IFK Göteborg | London |
| | | | | Stadium: Highbury |

| 19 March 1980 Quarter-Final (2nd Leg) | IFK Göteborg (Sweden) | 0–0 (1–5 agg.) | (England) Arsenal | Gothenburg |
| | | | | Stadium: Ullevi |

| 9 April 1980 Semi-Final (1st Leg) | Arsenal (England) | 1–1 | (Italy) Juventus | London |
| | | | | Stadium: Highbury |

| 23 April 1980 Semi-Final (2nd Leg) | Juventus (Italy) | 0–1 (1–2 agg.) | (England) Arsenal | Turin |
| | | | | Stadium: Stadio Comunale |

| 14 May 1980 Final | Arsenal (England) | 0–0 (aet) (4 – 5 pen.) | (Spain) Valencia CF | Brussels |
| | | | | Stadium: Heysel Stadium |

== Top scorers ==
=== First Division ===
- (England) Alan Sunderland 14
- (Republic of Ireland) Frank Stapleton 14
- (Republic of Ireland) Liam Brady 7
