= Kenny Sansom =

English footballer

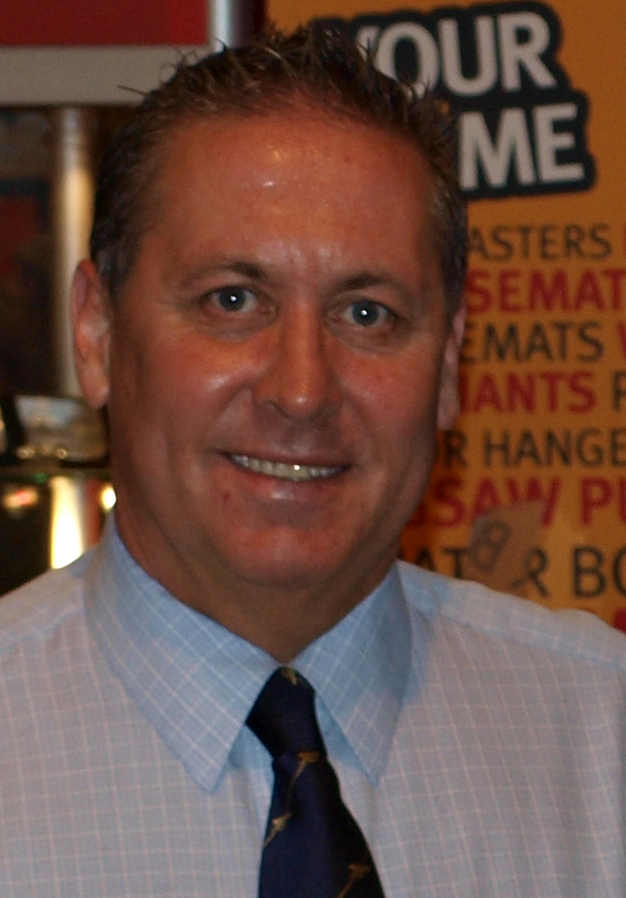
- Sansom in 2011

Personal information
- Full name: Kenneth Graham Sansom
- Date of birth: 26 September 1958 (age 68)
- Place of birth: Camberwell, London, England
- Height: 1.73 m (5 ft 8 in)
- Position: Left-back

Youth career
- Crystal Palace

Senior career*
Years	Team	Apps	(Gls)
1975–1980	Crystal Palace	172	(3)
1980–1988	Arsenal	314	(6)
1988–1989	Newcastle United	20	(0)
1989–1991	Queens Park Rangers	64	(0)
1991–1993	Coventry City	51	(0)
1993	Everton	7	(1)
1993	Brentford	8	(0)
1994	Watford	1	(0)
Total		637	(10)

International career
1974	England Schoolboys	7	(0)
1977	England Youth	5	(0)
1978–1980	England U21	8	(0)
1978–1979	England B	2	(0)
1979–1988	England	86	(1)
- * Club domestic league appearances and goals

Kenneth Graham Sansom (born 26 September 1958) is a former professional footballer who played as a left-back. An England international, he played for clubs such as Crystal Palace, Arsenal, Newcastle United, Coventry City, Queens Park Rangers, Everton and Watford.

He is the second most capped England national team full-back, having appeared 86 times for his country between 1979 and 1988.

== Club career ==
Kenneth Graham Sansom was born in Camberwell, London on 26 September 1958; the second youngest of five children. His father, George, was an itinerant who left the family home shortly after the birth of his youngest child. His mother, Rose, was a cleaner, and moved the family to Tulse Hill in 1960. He considered himself a goalkeeper in his early years, but while playing for a youth team called Spring Park Wolves he replaced an injured teammate at left-back, and remained a full-back for the rest of his career. He attended Beaufoy Secondary school, and was capped by England schoolboys.

=== Crystal Palace ===
Sansom was scouted by Arsenal, Queens Park Rangers and Tottenham Hotspur, but went on to join the youth team at Crystal Palace. He made his League debut against Tranmere Rovers on 7 May 1975.

In 1977, he captained the Palace junior team to FA Youth Cup success while also skippering the England youth team at the same level, collecting Palace's "Player of the Year" award in his first season.

Quick, calm, strong in the tackle and an excellent crosser of the ball, Sansom missed just one league game in a consecutive run of 156 games, starting in 1976, when Palace were in the Third Division. In the 1978–79 season Crystal Palace won the Second Division championship with Sansom integral to the young team. They were quickly labelled as the "Team of The '80s". and briefly topped the First Division at the start of the 1979–80 season although they ultimately finished in thirteenth position.

=== Arsenal ===
Arsenal submitted a bid of £1 million for Sansom in the summer of 1980, with striker Clive Allen going in exchange; this was an unusual move, as Allen was an equally prized young player and had only joined Arsenal from QPR a few weeks earlier, and was still to play a competitive match for the Gunners. Palace accepted the bid and Sansom left for Highbury.

Sansom made his Arsenal debut against West Bromwich Albion on 16 August 1980 and was an ever-present for the whole of that season and also the next, and a near-constant figure at left-back for the North London club. He was bestowed with the honour of Arsenal Player of the Season in 1981. Although a third-place finish did ensure European football was back on the agenda, no real title challenge was forthcoming. The next two seasons saw a top-five finish in 1982, and a disappointing tenth in 1983 when matters were not improved by semi-final defeats to Manchester United in both domestic cups. Terry Neill was dismissed in December 1983 and Don Howe took over. Arsenal finished sixth and seventh under Howe. During this period Sansom was remarkably consistent and ever present. After six seasons for Arsenal Sansom missed just seven games in all competitions. Meanwhile, silverware eluded both Sansom and Arsenal. In May 1986, Millwall manager George Graham, a former Arsenal double-winner, was appointed as Howe's long-term replacement, and it was the beginning of a new era of success at Highbury. Arsenal's form immediately improved and the club were top of the League at Christmas 1986.

Sansom finally won domestic silverware in 1987, captaining Arsenal to a League Cup final victory over Liverpool at Wembley; Arsenal came from a goal down to win 2–1, with Sansom starting the move which had led to Arsenal's late winner, scored by Charlie Nicholas.

The following season, Sansom's relationship with his Arsenal manager Graham soured and he was replaced as captain by fledgling defender Tony Adams, who was just 21. Sansom did, however, keep his place in the side; although Graham had just signed a long-term replacement in Nigel Winterburn. Arsenal reached the League Cup final again in 1988, but lost 3–2 to Luton Town in a dramatic and exciting match. Sansom's last appearance for Arsenal was against Everton at Goodison Park on 7 May 1988.

Sansom left Arsenal in December 1988, having not played a first team game at all for the first four months of 1988–89; Graham had signed Lee Dixon and had reshuffled the side, with Dixon playing at right-back and Winterburn on the left, replacing Sansom. Sansom had played 394 matches in total for Arsenal, scoring six goals.

=== Later career ===
Arsenal sold Sansom to Newcastle United for £300,000 in December 1988. The 1988-89 season was a season of contrasting fortunes between the two clubs as Arsenal won the League Championship and his new club finished bottom of the First Division. Sansom transferred to QPR in the summer of 1989 for £300,000 and scored against Arsenal in a 2–0 FA Cup fourth round replay victory at Loftus Road. After making 64 league appearances for QPR, he moved on to Coventry City for £100,000 in March 1991 and made 51 league appearances for 'The Sky Blues'. Sansom then had short spells at Everton (seven league appearances and one goal against Tottenham Hotspur), who he joined on a free transfer in February 1993, and First Division Brentford (eight appearances), who he joined on a free transfer a month later, March 1993, but he could not prevent 'The Bees' from being relegated. After playing non-league football with Chertsey Town, Sansom returned to league football again by joining Glenn Roeder and First Division Watford, as player and first team coach. Sansom made one league appearance for Watford, before he retired from top class football, though he did play on for non-league clubs such as Croydon F.C. and Slough Town. Since retiring from the game, he has often appeared on Sky Sports as a football analyst.

== International career ==
On 23 May 1979, Sansom made his debut for the full England team, in a goalless draw against Wales. The following year he starred for England in Euro 1980 in Italy, though England did not progress beyond the group stage. Sansom was a regular starter playing in the 1982 World Cup in Spain, in which England exited in the second group phase. He was still the first-choice left-back for the 1986 World Cup in Mexico, playing in all of the matches up to and including the quarter-final defeat against Argentina, in which he was one of the England players left trailing behind by Diego Maradona as the Argentinian burst from inside his own half to score a solo goal and his second of the match.

Sansom missed only a handful of England matches between 1980 and 1988; his record of 37 consecutive appearances between May 1984 and April 1987, has only been bettered by Billy Wright and Ron Flowers. He was occasionally rested in friendly matches so that coaches Ron Greenwood and then Bobby Robson could check on potential replacements Derek Statham, Alan Kennedy, Nick Pickering and Stuart Pearce in the event of losing Sansom either through serious injury or chronic loss of form. However, Sansom remained the regular left-back during England's UEFA Euro 1988 qualifying campaign.

That summer, Sansom was Robson's first-choice left-back for the European Championships, but England lost all three of their group games, starting with a surprise 1–0 defeat to the Republic of Ireland in their first ever finals match, having qualified under the management of Englishman and World Cup winner Jack Charlton.

Sansom made an error for the only goal of the game, toeing an attempted clearance high into the air and putting pressure on his fellow defenders, from which John Aldridge won a header for Ray Houghton to nod the ball past Peter Shilton. Sansom played in the other two group fixtures but after the tournament Stuart Pearce replaced him as England's first-choice left-back. After nine consecutive years, Sansom's international career was coming to a close, months before his 30th birthday. He was briefly recalled to the side in 1989 as a back-up when Pearce was injured, though he did not play. In all Sansom gained 86 caps with one goal which was scored in a 1984 World Cup qualifier against Finland.

Sansom is England's second-most capped full-back and only eleven players have appeared more times for England than Sansom. Among these are David Beckham, Bobby Moore, Steven Gerrard, Bobby Charlton, Bryan Robson, Frank Lampard, Michael Owen and Wayne Rooney and Peter Shilton. Jointly with Shilton, Sansom also holds the record for the most England caps in the 1980s, with 84 in all.

== Personal life ==
After retiring from playing, Sansom has battled with gambling addiction and alcoholism. In 2015 he said he had contemplated suicide after becoming homeless due to his problems.

Sansom was a tour guide on the "Legend's Tour" of Arsenal's Emirates Stadium.

He was a co-presenter of LBC Radio's Saturday afternoon football programme. Sansom was voted into Palace's Centenary XI.

On 7 February 2014, Sansom appeared at court in Bromley, charged with assault following an alleged incident at his former partner's property. He was cleared of all charges.

In May 2020 he was reportedly in hospital with an undisclosed illness. It was revealed six months later that he was diagnosed with Wernicke–Korsakoff syndrome, a type of dementia.

Sansom's father George and uncle Terry were investigated but not charged as suspects in the Great Train Robbery. Sansom stated that he thought that they were innocent, but that his uncle Freddie, a well-known armed robber, was likely a member of the gang that committed the crime.

== Career statistics ==
Appearances and goals by club, season and competition
Club	Season	League			FA Cup		Other		Total	
Club	Season	Division	Apps	Goals	Apps	Goals	Apps	Goals	Apps	Goals
Crystal Palace	1974–75	Third Division	1	0	0	0	0	0	1	0
Crystal Palace	1975–76	Third Division	6	0	0	0	0	0	6	0
Crystal Palace	1976–77	Third Division	46	0	6	0	3	0	55	0
Crystal Palace	1977–78	Second Division	41	2	1	0	4	0	46	2
Crystal Palace	1978–79	Second Division	42	0	4	1	4	0	50	1
Crystal Palace	1979–80	First Division	36	1	0	0	3	0	39	1
Crystal Palace	Total		172	3	11	1	14	0	197	4
Arsenal	1980–81	First Division	42	3	1	0	4	0	47	3
Arsenal	1981–82	First Division	42	0	1	0	9	0	52	0
Arsenal	1982–83	First Division	40	0	8	0	10	0	58	0
Arsenal	1983–84	First Division	40	1	1	0	4	0	45	1
Arsenal	1984–85	First Division	39	1	2	0	3	0	44	1
Arsenal	1985–86	First Division	42	0	5	0	7	0	54	0
Arsenal	1986–87	First Division	35	0	4	0	9	0	48	0
Arsenal	1987–88	First Division	34	1	4	0	8	0	46	1
Arsenal	Total		314	6	26	0	54	0	394	6
Newcastle United	1988–89	First Division	20	0	4	0	0	0	24	0
Queens Park Rangers	1989–90	First Division	36	0	9	2	3	0	48	2
Queens Park Rangers	1990–91	First Division	28	0	1	0	5	0	34	0
Queens Park Rangers	Total		64	0	10	2	8	0	82	2
Coventry City	1990–91	First Division	9	0	0	0	0	0	9	0
Coventry City	1991–92	First Division	21	0	2	0	0	0	23	0
Coventry City	1992–93	Premier League	21	0	0	0	2	0	23	0
Coventry City	Total		51	0	2	0	2	0	55	0
Everton	1992–93	Premier League	7	1	0	0	0	0	7	1
Brentford	1992–93	First Division	8	0	0	0	0	0	8	0
Watford	1994–95	First Division	1	0	0	0	0	0	1	0
Career total			637	10	53	3	78	0	768	13

== Honours ==
Crystal Palace Youth

- FA Youth Cup: 1977

Crystal Palace

- Football League Second Division: 1978–79

Arsenal

- Football League Cup: 1986–87; runner-up: 1987–88

England

- British Home Championship: 1981–82, 1982–83

Individual

- Crystal Palace Player of the Year: 1977, 1979
- Arsenal Player of the Season: 1980−81
- PFA Team of the Year: 1976–77 Third Division, 1977–78 Second Division, 1979–79 Second Division, 1979–80 First Division, 1980–81 First Division, 1981–82 First Division, 1983–84 First Division, 1984–85 First Division, 1985–86 First Division, 1986–87 First Division
