= 1987–88 Arsenal F.C. season =

English football club season

Arsenal
1987–88 season
- Chairman: Peter Hill-Wood
- Manager: George Graham
- Stadium: Highbury
- First Division: 6th
- FA Cup: Quarter-finals
- League Cup: Runners-up
- Top goalscorer: League: Alan Smith (11); All: Alan Smith (16)
- Highest home attendance: 54,703 vs. Liverpool (15 August 1987)
- Lowest home attendance: 18,321 vs. Doncaster Rovers (6 October 1987)
- Average home league attendance: 30,111
Home colours	Away colours

The 1987–88 season was Arsenal Football Club's 62nd consecutive season in the top flight of English football. Arsenal finished sixth in the Football League First Division. Although the team again reached the final of the League Cup, Arsenal could not replicate the previous season's success, losing 3-2 to Luton Town. Arsenal lost in the quarterfinals of the FA Cup to Nottingham Forest.

Arsenal saw several notable changes in the transfer market. Charlie Nicholas, hardly playing, departed and defender Viv Anderson left for Manchester United. Manager George Graham looked to strengthen Arsenal's defensive options, bringing in Nigel Winterburn at left-back and later in the season, Lee Dixon at right-back. Brian Marwood was also signed in the late window as an alternative to Martin Hayes, and soon formed a good relationship with striker Alan Smith. Michael Thomas and Paul Merson, Arsenal academy products, also became first team regulars.

Near the end of the season, 21-year-old Tony Adams was named captain.

== Season summary ==
After finishing fourth in the league and winning the Football League Cup a year earlier, Arsenal slipped to finish sixth. They did reach the League Cup final for the second year in a row. Although Arsenal took a 2–1 lead against Luton Town at Wembley, Nigel Winterburn missed a penalty which would have given them a 3–1 lead, and ended up losing the game 3–2. Arsenal were quarter-finalists in the FA Cup, losing to Nottingham Forest.

In the league, Arsenal got off to a slow start, winning just one of their first five games, before going top of the table with a 10-match winning run. They won 14 consecutive games between 12 September and 17 November 1987, in all competitions, a club record at the time.

However, Arsenal then went into freefall, winning just one of their next 11 league games. Injury to David O'Leary weakened the team's traditionally strong defense. Liverpool, the eventual league champion, easily won both their matches against Arsenal. Although their form improved during the final four months of the season, Arsenal could only manage a sixth-place finish. Young midfielders Michael Thomas and Paul Merson became regular members of the first team during this season. Defender Tony Adams, still only 21, succeeded Kenny Sansom as captain, on 6 March 1988 against Tottenham Hotspur at Highbury.

Arsenal had agreed an £850,000 deal for Leicester City striker Alan Smith two months before the end of the previous season, although he had remained on loan back at the East Midlands club until the end of the campaign. Smith finished as Arsenal's top scorer in his first season at the club, finding the net 16 times in all competitions. Charlie Nicholas, meanwhile, fell into Arsenal obscurity. After playing in the first three matches, he exclusively featured for the reserves before being sold to Aberdeen in January 1988.

A new signing at the start of the season was Nigel Winterburn, who arrived from Wimbledon to fill the right-back position left vacant by the sale of Viv Anderson to Manchester United. Michael Thomas started the 1987/88 season at right back but his athleticism and passing ability soon brought a move to central midfield. From January 1988 Winterburn, the left-footed defender initially had to settle for the right-back role. Later signings at the club, were defender Lee Dixon in January 1988, who started in six matches as right-back, as well as winger Brian Marwood in March 1988, who started in four before the end of the season.

Arsenal were in a great run of form when they travelled to The Dell to face Southampton on 9 April 1988. Arsenal were unbeaten in eight league games and, even though they were missing Tony Adams and David O’Leary, Southampton won 4–2. All the talk was centred on Southampton's new star, Alan Shearer who, at 17 years and 240 days, and broke Jimmy Greaves’ record of the youngest player to score a hat-trick in the English top flight. It had also been 21 years since a player had scored a hat-trick on his full debut in English football.

== Squad ==
Note: Flags indicate national team as defined under FIFA eligibility rules; some limited exceptions apply. Players may hold more than one non-FIFA nationality.

Pos.	Nation	Player
GK	ENG	John Lukic
DF	ENG	Michael Thomas
DF	ENG	Kenny Sansom (captain 1)
MF	ENG	Steve Williams
DF	IRL	David O'Leary
DF	ENG	Tony Adams (captain 2)
MF	ENG	David Rocastle
MF	ENG	Paul Davis
FW	ENG	Alan Smith
FW	ENG	Perry Groves
MF	ENG	Kevin Richardson

Pos.	Nation	Player
MF	ENG	Martin Hayes
DF	ENG	Gus Caesar
DF	ENG	Nigel Winterburn
FW	ENG	Paul Merson
MF	ENG	Graham Rix
FW	IRL	Niall Quinn
DF	ENG	Lee Dixon
MF	ENG	Brian Marwood
FW	SCO	Charlie Nicholas
FW	ENG	Kevin Campbell
GK	WAL	Rhys Wilmot

== Top scorers ==
=== First Division ===
- (England) Alan Smith 11
- (England) Michael Thomas 9
- (England) David Rocastle 7
- (England) Perry Groves 6
- (England) Paul Davis 5
- (England) Paul Merson 5

== Results ==
=== First Division ===
Pos	Team	Pld	W	D	L	GF	GA	GD	Pts	Qualification or relegation
4	Everton	40	19	13	8	53	27	+26	70	Qualified for the Football League Centenary Trophy
5	Queens Park Rangers	40	19	10	11	48	38	+10	67	Qualified for the Football League Centenary Trophy
6	Arsenal	40	18	12	10	58	39	+19	66	Qualified for the Football League Centenary Trophy
7	Wimbledon (Note: Wimbledon would have qualified as FA Cup winners.)	40	14	15	11	58	47	+11	57	Qualified for the Football League Centenary Trophy and disqualified from the European Cup Winners' Cup
8	Newcastle United	40	14	14	12	55	53	+2	56	Qualified for the Football League Centenary Trophy

Source: World Football
Rules for classification: 1) Points; 2) Goal difference; 3) Goals scored
Notes:

15 August 1987 1	Arsenal	1–2	Liverpool	London
				Stadium: Highbury; Attendance: 54,073

19 August 1987 2	Manchester United	0–0	Arsenal	Manchester
				Stadium: Old Trafford

22 August 1987 3	Queen's Park Rangers	2–0	Arsenal	London
				Stadium: Loftus Road

29 August 1987 4	Arsenal	6–0	Portsmouth	London
				Stadium: Highbury

31 August 1987 5	Luton Town	1–1	Arsenal	Luton
				Stadium: Kenilworth Road

12 September 1987 6	Nottingham Forest	0–1	Arsenal	Nottingham
				Stadium: City Ground

19 September 1987 7	Arsenal	3–0	Wimbledon	London
				Stadium: Highbury

26 September 1987 8	Arsenal	1–0	West Ham United	London
				Stadium: Highbury

3 October 1987 9	Charlton Athletic	0–3	Arsenal	London
				Stadium: Selhurst Park

10 October 1987 10	Arsenal	2–0	Oxford United	London
				Stadium: Highbury

18 October 1987 11	Tottenham Hotspur	1–2	Arsenal	London
				Stadium: White Hart Lane

24 October 1987 12	Arsenal	2–1	Derby County	London
				Stadium: Highbury

31 October 1987 13	Newcastle United	0–1	Arsenal	Newcastle
				Stadium: St James' Park

3 November 1987 14	Arsenal	3–1	Chelsea	London
				Stadium: Highbury

14 November 1987 15	Norwich City	2–4	Arsenal	Norwich
				Stadium: Carrow Road

21 November 1987 16	Arsenal	0–1	Southampton	London
				Stadium: Highbury

28 November 1987 17	Watford	2–0	Arsenal	London
				Stadium: Vicarage Road

5 December 1987 18	Arsenal	3–1	Sheffield Wednesday	London
				Stadium: Highbury

13 December 1987 19	Coventry City	0–0	Arsenal	Coventry
				Stadium: Highfield Road

19 December 1987 20	Arsenal	1–1	Everton	London
				Stadium: Highbury

26 December 1987 21	Arsenal	0–2	Nottingham Forest	London
				Stadium: Highbury

28 December 1987 22	Wimbledon	3–1	Arsenal	London
				Stadium: Plough Lane

1 January 1988 23	Portsmouth	1–1	Arsenal	Portsmouth
				Stadium: Fratton Park

2 January 1988 24	Arsenal	0–0	Queen's Park Rangers	London
				Stadium: Highbury

16 January 1988 25	Liverpool	2–0	Arsenal	Liverpool
				Stadium: Anfield

24 January 1988 26	Arsenal	1–2	Manchester United	London
				Stadium: Highbury

13 February 1988 27	Arsenal	2–1	Luton Town	London
				Stadium: Highbury

27 February 1988 28	Arsenal	4–0	Charlton Athletic	London
				Stadium: Highbury

6 March 1988 29	Arsenal	2–1	Tottenham Hotspur	London
				Stadium: Highbury

19 March 1988 30	Arsenal	1–1	Newcastle United	London
				Stadium: Highbury

26 March 1988 31	Derby County	0–0	Arsenal	Derby
				Stadium: Baseball Ground

30 March 1988 32	Oxford United	0–0	Arsenal	Oxford
				Stadium: Manor Ground

2 April 1988 33	Chelsea	1–1	Arsenal	London
				Stadium: Stamford Bridge

4 April 1988 34	Arsenal	2–0	Norwich City	London
				Stadium: Highbury

9 April 1988 35	Southampton	4–2	Arsenal	Southampton
				Stadium: The Dell

12 April 1988 36	West Ham United	0–1	Arsenal	London
				Stadium: Upton Park

15 April 1988 37	Arsenal	0–1	Watford	London
				Stadium: Highbury

30 April 1988 38	Sheffield Wednesday	3–3	Arsenal	Sheffield
				Stadium: Hillsborough Stadium

2 May 1988 39	Arsenal	1–1	Coventry City	London
				Stadium: Highbury

7 May 1988 40	Everton	1–2	Arsenal	Liverpool
				Stadium: Goodison Park

=== Football League Cup ===
23 September 1987 Second round (1st Leg)	Doncaster Rovers	0–3	Arsenal	Doncaster
				Stadium: Belle Vue

6 October 1987 Second round (2nd Leg)	Arsenal	1–0 (4–0 agg.)	Doncaster Rovers	London
				Stadium: Highbury

27 October 1987 Third round	Arsenal	3–0	Bournemouth	London
				Stadium: Highbury

17 November 1987 Fourth round	Arsenal	3–0	Stoke City	London
				Stadium: Highbury

20 January 1988 Quarter-Final	Sheffield Wednesday	0–1	Arsenal	Sheffield
				Stadium: Hillsborough Stadium

7 February 1988 Semi-Final (1st Leg)	Everton	0–1	Arsenal	Liverpool
				Stadium: Goodison Park

24 February 1988 Semi-Final (2nd Leg)	Arsenal	3–1 (4–1 agg.)	Everton	London
				Stadium: Highbury

24 April 1988 Final	Arsenal	2–3	Luton Town	London
	Hayes, Smith			Stadium: Wembley Stadium; Attendance: 95,732

=== FA Cup ===
Arsenal entered the FA Cup in the third round proper, in which they were drawn to face Millwall.

9 January 1988 Third round	Arsenal	2–0	Millwall	London
	Hayes, Rocastle			Stadium: Highbury; Attendance: 42,083

30 January 1988 Fourth round	Brighton & Hove Albion	1–2	Arsenal	Brighton
			Richardson, Groves	Stadium: Goldstone Ground; Attendance: 26,467

20 February 1988 Fifth round	Arsenal	2–1	Manchester United	London
	Smith, o.g.			Stadium: Highbury; Attendance: 54,161

12 March 1988 Sixth round	Arsenal	1–2	Nottingham Forest	London
	Rocastle			Stadium: Highbury; Attendance: 50,157

== See also ==
- 1987–88 in English football
- List of Arsenal F.C. seasons
