= 1984–85 Arsenal F.C. season =

English football club season

Arsenal F.C.
1984–85 season
- Manager: Don Howe
- First Division: 7th
- FA Cup: Fourth round
- League Cup: Third round
- Top goalscorer: League: Ian Allinson; Brian Talbot; Tony Woodcock (10 each); All: Tony Woodcock (13 goals)
| Home colours | Away colours |

The 1984–85 season was Arsenal Football Club's 59th consecutive season in the top flight of English football. After a promising start to the season, they slipped to seventh in the Football League First Division.

After the previous season's League Cup exit to Walsall, Arsenal once-again exited cup competition to lower-division opponents. The team lost to second-division Oxford United in the League Cup and third-division York City in the FA Cup.

Viv Anderson was one important addition to the squad, strengthening their defense when he joined Arsenal for £250,000. 18-year old Tony Adams made sixteen league appearances after his debut the previous season.

Midway through the season, Pat Jennings was replaced by John Lukic as the first choice keeper.

== Season summary ==
Arsenal's start to the 1984/85 season had been relatively promising, with eight wins in the first eleven league matches. Don Howe had taken over from Terry Neill in December 1983 and results had improved. At the end of October 1984 saw Arsenal looking like a team that could challenge for the title; they had reclaimed their place at the top of Division One. However, that good form soon dipped. After a 4-2 defeat at Old Trafford, Arsenal slowly began to fall. The season overall was a disappointment.

Some decent league performances were undermined by a complete lack of consistency, they lost to Second Division Oxford United in the League Cup, and Third Division York City in the FA Cup. York City's victory over Arsenal in the fourth round, still resonates as one of the competition's big shocks. A star-studded Arsenal-side, put together at a cost of more than £4.5 million and featuring eight internationals, arrived at Bootham Crescent on 26 January 1985. But on a snow-bound day in York, Arsenal met their match against a heroic side that defied the odds to record a 1–0 victory, with a last minute penalty by Keith Houchen.

The 1984-85 season was Pat Jennings' final season at Arsenal. On Halloween night in 1984, Arsenal played Oxford United away in the League Cup; Arsenal were beaten 3-2 and eliminated from the competition. John Lukic played the next game, but Jennings returned to the side for three more matches, the last being up at Hillsborough against Sheffield Wednesday on 25 November 1984. Lukic returned to the side against Luton Town 1 December 1984, and Jennings never played for Arsenal again. Jennings played in a farewell match against Tottenham Hotspur 8 May 1985 at Highbury.

== Squad ==
Note: Flags indicate national team as defined under FIFA eligibility rules; some limited exceptions apply. Players may hold more than one non-FIFA nationality.

| Pos. | Nation | Player |
|---|---|---|
| GK | ENG | John Lukic |
| DF | ENG | Viv Anderson |
| DF | ENG | Kenny Sansom |
| MF | ENG | Brian Talbot |
| DF | IRL | David O'Leary |
| DF | ENG | Tommy Caton |
| MF | ENG | Stewart Robson |
| MF | ENG | Paul Davis |
| FW | ENG | Paul Mariner |
| FW | ENG | Tony Woodcock |
| FW | SCO | Charlie Nicholas |

| Pos. | Nation | Player |
|---|---|---|
| MF | ENG | Ian Allinson |
| MF | ENG | Graham Rix |
| DF | ENG | Tony Adams |
| GK | NIR | Pat Jennings |
| MF | ENG | Steve Williams |
| FW | ENG | Raphael Meade |
| DF | NIR | Colin Hill |

== Results ==
=== First Division ===
| Pos | Team | Pld | W | D | L | GF | GA | GD | Pts | Qualification or relegation |
|---|---|---|---|---|---|---|---|---|---|---|
| 5 | Southampton | 42 | 19 | 11 | 12 | 56 | 47 | +9 | 68 | Qualified for the Football League Super Cup and disqualified from the UEFA Cup |
| 6 | Chelsea | 42 | 18 | 12 | 12 | 63 | 48 | +15 | 66 | |
| 7 | Arsenal | 42 | 19 | 9 | 14 | 61 | 49 | +12 | 66 | |
| 8 | Sheffield Wednesday | 42 | 17 | 14 | 11 | 58 | 45 | +13 | 65 | |
| 9 | Nottingham Forest | 42 | 19 | 7 | 16 | 56 | 48 | +8 | 64 | |

Source: World Football
Rules for classification: 1) Points; 2) Goal difference; 3) Goals scored

| 25 August 1984 1 | Arsenal | 1–1 | Chelsea | London |
| | | | | Stadium: Highbury |

| 29 August 1984 2 | Nottingham Forest | 2–0 | Arsenal | Nottingham |
| | | | | Stadium: City Ground |

| 1 September 1984 3 | Watford | 3–4 | Arsenal | Watford |
| | | | | Stadium: Vicarge Road |

| 4 September 1984 4 | Arsenal | 2–0 | Newcastle United | London |
| | | | | Stadium: Highbury |

| 8 September 1984 5 | Arsenal | 3–1 | Liverpool | London |
| | | | | Stadium: Highbury |

| 15 September 1984 6 | Ipswich Town | 2–1 | Arsenal | Ipswich |
| | | | | Stadium: Portman Road |

| 22 September 1984 7 | Arsenal | 4–0 | Stoke City | London |
| | | | | Stadium: Highbury |

| 29 September 1984 8 | Coventry City | 1–2 | Arsenal | Coventry |
| | | | | Stadium: Highfield Road |

| 6 October 1984 9 | Arsenal | 1–0 | Everton | London |
| | | | | Stadium: Highbury |

| 13 October 1984 10 | Leicester City | 1–4 | Arsenal | Leicester |
| | | | | Stadium: Filbert Street |

| 20 October 1984 11 | Arsenal | 3–2 | Sunderland | London |
| | | | | Stadium: Highbury |

| 27 October 1984 12 | West Ham United | 3–1 | Arsenal | London |
| | | | | Stadium: Upton Park |

| 2 November 1984 13 | Manchester United | 4–2 | Arsenal | Manchester |
| | | | | Stadium: Old Trafford |

| 10 November 1984 14 | Arsenal | 1–1 | Aston Villa | London |
| | | | | Stadium: Highbury |

| 17 November 1984 15 | Arsenal | 1–0 | Queen's Park Rangers | London |
| | | | | Stadium: Highbury |

| 25 November 1984 16 | Sheffield Wednesday | 2–1 | Arsenal | Sheffield |
| | | | | Stadium: Hillsborough |

| 1 December 1984 17 | Arsenal | 3–1 | Luton Town | London |
| | | | | Stadium: Highbury |

| 8 November 1984 18 | Southampton | 1–0 | Arsenal | Southampton |
| | | | | Stadium: The Dell |

| 15 December 1984 19 | Arsenal | 4–0 | West Bromwich Albion | London |
| | | | | Stadium: Highbury |

| 22 December 1984 20 | Arsenal | 1–1 | Watford | London |
| | | | | Stadium: Highbury |

| 26 December 1984 21 | Norwich City | 1–0 | Arsenal | Norwich |
| | | | | Stadium: Carrow Road |

| 29 December 1984 22 | Newcastle United | 1–3 | Arsenal | Newcastle |
| | | | | Stadium: St James' Park |

| 1 January 1985 23 | Arsenal | 1–2 | Tottenham Hotspur | London |
| | | | | Stadium: Highbury |

| 19 January 1985 24 | Chelsea | 1–1 | Arsenal | London |
| | | | | Stadium: Stamford Bridge |

| 2 February 1985 25 | Arsenal | 2–1 | Coventry City | London |
| | | | | Stadium: Highbury |

| 12 February 1985 26 | Liverpool | 3–0 | Arsenal | Liverpool |
| | | | | Stadium: Anfield |

| 23 February 1985 27 | Arsenal | 0–1 | Manchester United | London |
| | | | | Stadium: Highbury |

| 2 March 1985 28 | Arsenal | 2–1 | West Ham United | London |
| | | | | Stadium: Highbury |

| 9 March 1985 29 | Sunderland | 0–0 | Arsenal | Sunderland |
| | | | | Stadium: Roker Park |

| 13 March 1985 30 | Aston Villa | 0–0 | Arsenal | Birmingham |
| | | | | Stadium: Villa Park |

| 16 March 1985 31 | Arsenal | 2–0 | Leicester City | London |
| | | | | Stadium: Highbury |

| 19 March 1985 32 | Arsenal | 1–1 | Ipswich Town | London |
| | | | | Stadium: Highbury |

| 23 March 1985 33 | Everton | 2–0 | Arsenal | Liverpool |
| | | | | Stadium: Goodison Park |

| 30 March 1985 34 | Stoke City | 2–0 | Arsenal | Stoke |
| | | | | Stadium: Victoria Ground |

| 6 April 1985 35 | Arsenal | 2–0 | Norwich City | London |
| | | | | Stadium: Highbury |

| 13 April 1985 36 | Arsenal | 1–1 | Nottingham Forest | London |
| | | | | Stadium: Highbury |

| 17 April 1985 37 | Tottenham Hotspur | 0–2 | Arsenal | London |
| | | | | Stadium: White Hart Lane |

| 20 April 1985 38 | Queen's Park Rangers | 1–0 | Arsenal | London |
| | | | | Stadium: Loftus Road |

| 27 April 1985 39 | Arsenal | 1–0 | Sheffield Wednesday | London |
| | | | | Stadium: Highbury |

| 4 May 1985 40 | Luton Town | 3–1 | Arsenal | Luton |
| | | | | Stadium: Kenilworth Road |

| 6 May 1985 41 | Arsenal | 1–0 | Southampton | London |
| | | | | Stadium: Highbury |

| 11 May 1985 42 | West Bromwich Albion | 2–2 | Arsenal | West Bromwich |
| | | | | Stadium: The Hawthorns |

=== Football League Cup ===
| 25 September 1984 Second round (1st Leg) | Arsenal | 4–0 | Bristol Rovers | London |
| | | | | Stadium: Highbury |

| 9 October 1984 Second round (2nd Leg) | Bristol Rovers | 1–1 (1–5 agg.) | Arsenal | Bristol |
| | | | | Stadium: Eastville Stadium |

| 31 October 1984 Third round | Oxford United | 3–2 | Arsenal | Oxford |
| | | | | Stadium: Manor Ground, Oxford |

=== FA Cup ===
Arsenal entered the FA Cup in the third round proper, in which they were drawn to face Hereford United.

| 5 January 1985 Third round | Hereford United | 1–1 | Arsenal | Hereford |
| | Price 34' | | Woodcock 23' | Stadium: Edgar Street |

| 22 January 1985 Third round replay | Arsenal | 7–2 | Hereford United | London |
| | | | | Stadium: Highbury |

| 26 January 1985 Fourth round | York City | 1–0 | Arsenal | York |
| | Houchen 89' (pen.) | | | Stadium: Bootham Crescent |

== Top scorers ==
=== First Division ===
- (England) Tony Woodcock 10
- (England) Brian Talbot 10
- (England) Ian Allinson 10
- (Scotland) Charlie Nicholas 9
- (England) Paul Mariner 7
