= Iceland Triangular Tournament =

1986 Iceland Triangular Tournament
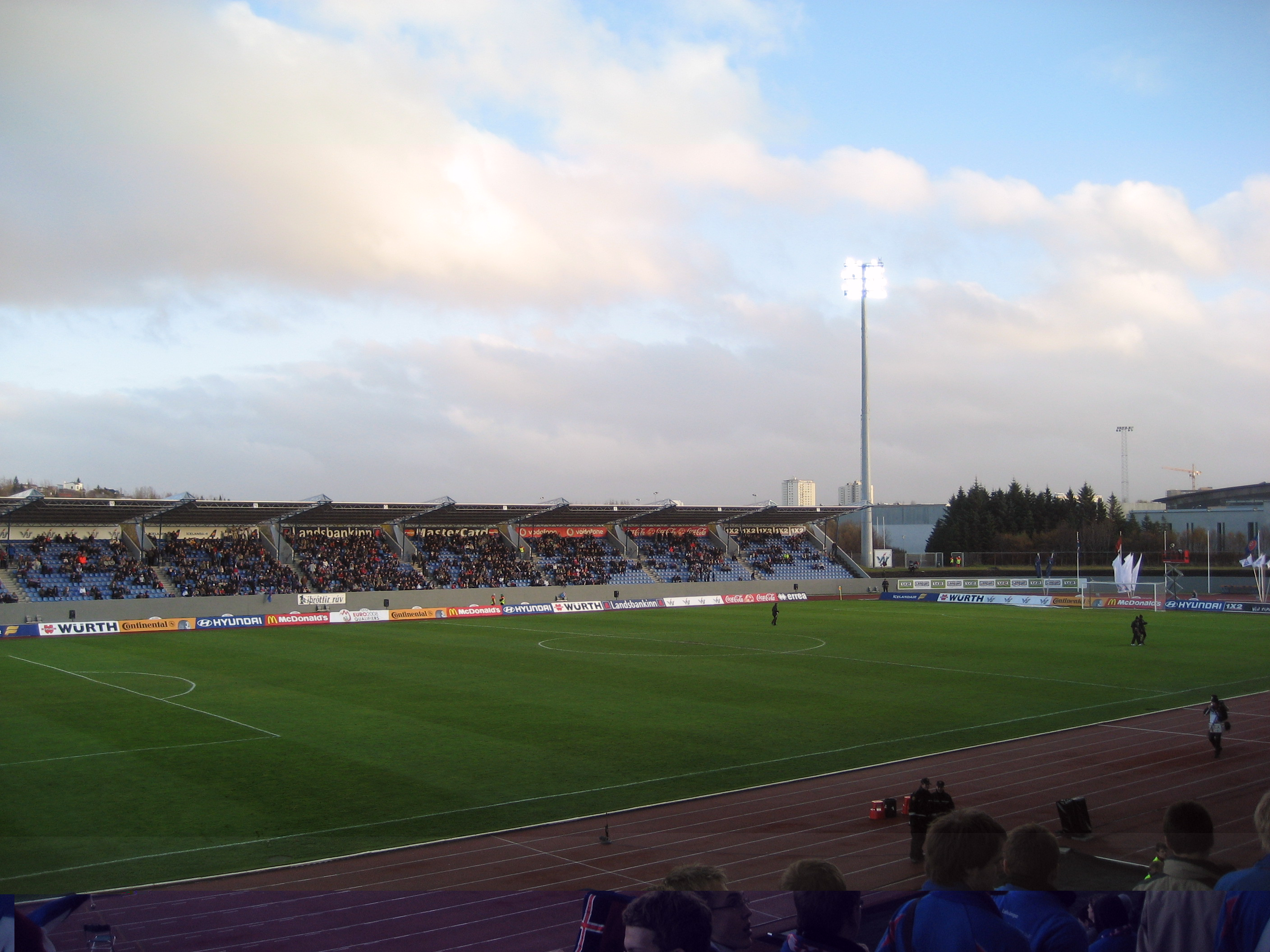
- Laugardalsvöllur stadium (pictured in 2009)

Tournament details
- Host country: Iceland
- City: Reykjavík
- Dates: 25 – 29 May 1986
- Teams: 3
- Venue: Laugardalsvöllur

Final positions
- Champions: Republic of Ireland

Tournament statistics
- Matches played: 3
- Goals scored: 7 (2.33 per match)
- Attendance: 6,687 (2,229 per match)
- Top scorer: 7 players (1 each)

The Iceland Triangular Tournament was an international football tournament in 1986. All matches were played in Laugardalsvöllur, Reykjavík. The three teams competing were the Republic of Ireland, Iceland and Czechoslovakia.

The Republic of Ireland won the competition, the first time that country won an international football tournament. It was notable as the beginning of the success that came under Jack Charlton's management; it was here that he trialled his famous tactics of pressuring opposition defenders in the hope of forcing mistakes. David O'Leary refused to play, instead going on a family holiday, which led to his being dropped from the international team for a time, Mick McCarthy taking his place at centre half. Ray Houghton, John Aldridge and Pat Bonner also established themselves in the Irish team after playing in Iceland. It featured the only international appearances by Mick Kennedy.

== Results ==
25 May 1986
19:00

Iceland	1–2	Republic of Ireland
Guðjohnsen 40'	(Report)	McGrath 34'; Daly 84'

Laugardalsvöllur, Reykjavík, Iceland
Attendance: 4,246
Referee: Worrall (England)

27 May 1986
19:00

Czechoslovakia	0–1	Republic of Ireland
	(Report)	Stapleton 82'

Laugardalsvöllur, Reykjavík, Iceland
Attendance: 1,000
Referee: Olsen (Iceland)

29 May 1986
19:00

Iceland	1–2	Czechoslovakia
Steinsson 64'	(Report)	Kula 82'; Jozef Chovanec

Laugardalsvöllur, Reykjavík, Iceland
Attendance: 1,441
Referee: Worrall (England)

== Table ==
	Team	Pld	W	D	L	GF	GA	GD	Pts
1	Republic of Ireland	2	2	0	0	3	1	+2	4
2	Czechoslovakia	2	1	0	1	2	2	0	2
3	Iceland	2	0	0	2	2	4	−2	0
