= John Devine (footballer, born 1958) =

Irish footballer, coach, and manager

Personal information
- Full name: John Anthony Devine
- Date of birth: 11 November 1958 (age 67)
- Place of birth: Dublin, Republic of Ireland
- Height: 5 ft 10 1/2 in (1.79 m)
- Positions: Right-back; midfielder

Senior career*
| Years | Team | Apps | (Gls) |
| 1978–1983 | Arsenal | 112 | (0) |
| 1983–1985 | Norwich City | 53 | (3) |
| 1985–1986 | Stoke City | 15 | (1) |
| 1987–1988 | East Bengal | 18 | (1) |
| 1988–1989 | IK Start | 6 | (2) |
| 1989–1991 | Shamrock Rovers | 41 | (7) |
| Total | | 245 | (14) |

International career
| 1978–1979 | Republic of Ireland U21 | 2 | (0) |
| 1979–1984 | Republic of Ireland | 13 | (0) |
- * Club domestic league appearances and goals

John Anthony Devine (born 11 November 1958) is an Irish former football player and coach.

Devine began his career with English club Arsenal along with a number of fellow Irish apprentices, He progressed through the youth ranks at Highbury and played in the 1980 FA Cup final defeat against West Ham United. In 1983, he signed for Norwich City. He spent two years at Carrow Road making 69 appearances and was an unused substitute in the 1985 Football League Cup final. In the summer of 1985 he signed for Stoke City but after making 16 appearances he broke his leg. He later spent time abroad playing in Norway for IK Start and in India with East Bengal before returning home in 1989 to play for Shamrock Rovers. After his playing career he coached Shelbourne and was later head coach of Sporting Fingal.

== Playing career ==
Born in Dublin, Devine joined London club Arsenal in November 1974 as an apprentice. Part of a large young Irish contingent at Arsenal (which also included Liam Brady, David O'Leary and Frank Stapleton), Devine turned professional in 1976. A full back who preferred playing on the right, he made his debut for the Gunners on 22 April 1978 in place of Pat Rice.

With the older Rice and Sammy Nelson occupying the Arsenal full back positions of the time, Devine didn't break into the first team straight away, although he did play in the 1980 FA Cup final defeat against West Ham United in preference to Nelson, Devine was also a member the Arsenal squad for the Gunners' Cup Winners Cup final against Valencia. After Rice left for Watford in the summer of 1980, Devine stepped up to become Arsenal's regular right-back, playing 44 times in 1980–81. However, his tenure there didn't last, after Devine was out of the side with a serious injury, John Hollins was moved back into defence as cover, and Devine could not reclaim his place once he had regained fitness.

He joined Norwich City in the summer of 1983 and played 69 games in two seasons for the "Canaries", and was a member of the squad in the 1985 League Cup final win. However, in the league Norwich suffered relegation in the Second Division and Devine left for Stoke City in November 1985. At the Victoria Ground Devine had the unenviable task of filling in for the retired Alan Hudson and made a good start as on his debut Stoke beat Oldham Athletic 4–2. He scored his only goal for Stoke in a 1–0 win over Fulham on 18 February 1986. His Stoke career was ended when he broke his leg after being tackled by Brighton & Hove Albion's Eric Young.

Devine then spent the 1988 season with Norwegian club Start helping the side gain promotion to 1. divisjon. He returned to Ireland with Shamrock Rovers in 1989 making his debut on 9 August in the Leinster Senior Cup (association football). He played in the first game at the RDS Arena on 30 September 1990 and helped Rovers to the FAI Cup final in 1991. He made a total of 41 appearances scoring 7 goals for the "Hoops". His last game was on the opening day of the 1991–92 season on 1 September.

Devine also spent a season in India with Kolkata giants East Bengal FC. From 1987 to 1988, he appeared in 18 matches for the Red and gold brigade in Calcutta Football League and Durand Cup, scoring a goal. He was in East Bengal's 1987 All Airlines Gold Cup and 1988 Calcutta Football League winning squad. Thus he became one of the greatest foreign recruits in the history of the club.

== International career ==
Devine was capped for the Republic of Ireland at every level, winning thirty caps in all, with thirteen of those coming for the senior side. He made his senior debut on 26 September 1979 against Czechoslovakia, and his last cap came against Norway on 17 October 1984. He never played in a World Cup or European Championship finals, as Ireland did not qualify for any tournaments during that time, although most of his caps were won in European and World Cup Qualifying games.

== Coaching career ==
He became head coach and then caretaker manager at Shelbourne after Eamonn Gregg was sacked in November 1994. Devine was head coach at Sporting Fingal for three seasons from 2008 to 2011, during which time the Club won promotion two years in succession and won the 2009 FAI Cup final against Sligo Rovers. He worked for 10 years at Manchester United's academy as the club's Irish Academy director.

== Career statistics ==
=== Club ===
Appearances and goals by club, season and competition
| Club | Season | League | | | FA Cup | | League Cup | | Europe | | Total | |
| Club | Season | Division | Apps | Goals | Apps | Goals | Apps | Goals | Apps | Goals | Apps | Goals |
|---|---|---|---|---|---|---|---|---|---|---|---|---|
| Arsenal | 1977–78 | First Division | 3 | 0 | 0 | 0 | 0 | 0 | 0 | 0 | 3 | 0 |
| Arsenal | 1978–79 | First Division | 7 | 0 | 0 | 0 | 0 | 0 | 1 | 0 | 8 | 0 |
| Arsenal | 1979–80 | First Division | 20 | 0 | 5 | 0 | 3 | 0 | 5 | 0 | 33 | 0 |
| Arsenal | 1980–81 | First Division | 39 | 0 | 1 | 0 | 4 | 0 | 0 | 0 | 44 | 0 |
| Arsenal | 1981–82 | First Division | 11 | 0 | 0 | 0 | 1 | 0 | 3 | 0 | 15 | 0 |
| Arsenal | 1982–83 | First Division | 9 | 0 | 0 | 0 | 0 | 0 | 0 | 0 | 9 | 0 |
| Arsenal | Total | | 89 | 0 | 6 | 0 | 8 | 0 | 9 | 0 | 112 | 0 |
| Norwich City | 1983–84 | First Division | 32 | 3 | 5 | 0 | 4 | 0 | 0 | 0 | 41 | 3 |
| Norwich City | 1984–85 | First Division | 21 | 0 | 3 | 0 | 4 | 0 | 0 | 0 | 28 | 0 |
| Norwich City | Total | | 53 | 3 | 8 | 0 | 8 | 0 | 0 | 0 | 69 | 3 |
| Stoke City | 1985–86 | Second Division | 15 | 1 | 1 | 0 | 0 | 0 | 0 | 0 | 16 | 1 |
| Career total | | | 153 | 4 | 15 | 0 | 16 | 0 | 9 | 0 | 197 | 4 |

=== International ===
Appearances and goals by national team and year
| National team | Year | Apps | Goals |
|---|---|---|---|
| Republic of Ireland | 1979 | 2 | 0 |
| Republic of Ireland | 1981 | 3 | 0 |
| Republic of Ireland | 1982 | 2 | 0 |
| Republic of Ireland | 1983 | 3 | 0 |
| Republic of Ireland | 1984 | 3 | 0 |
| Total | | 13 | 0 |

== Honours ==
=== As player ===
Arsenal

- FA Cup runner-up: 1979–80
- UEFA Cup Winners' Cup runner-up: 1979–80

Norwich City

- Football League Cup: 1984–85

IK Start

- 2. divisjon: 1988

Shamrock Rovers

- FAI Cup runner-up: 1991

East Bengal

- Calcutta Football League: 1988
- All Airlines Gold Cup: 1987

=== As head coach ===
Sporting Fingal

- FAI Cup: 2009

== Sources ==
- Paul Doolan; Robert Goggins. The Hoops. ISBN 0-7171-2121-6.
