= David O'Leary =

Football manager and Republic of Ireland international footballer

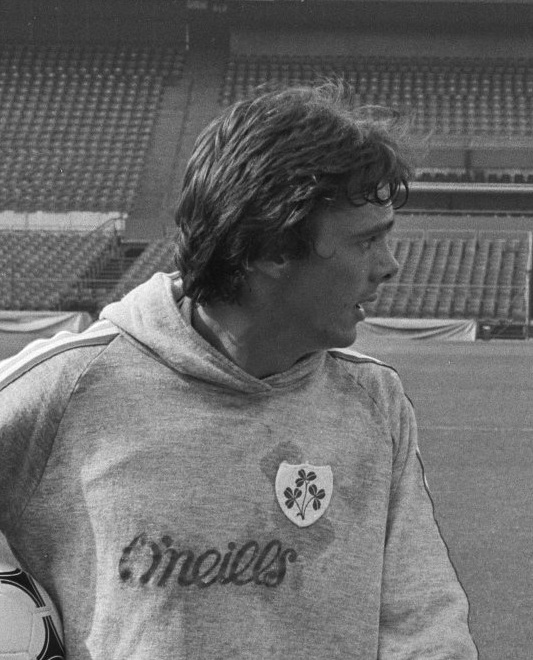
- O'Leary in 1981

Personal information
- Full name: David Anthony O'Leary
- Date of birth: 2 May 1958 (age 68)
- Place of birth: Stoke Newington, Greater London, England
- Height: 6 ft 1 in (1.86 m)
- Position: Centre-back

Youth career
- 1973–1975: Arsenal

Senior career*
Years	Team	Apps	(Gls)
1975–1993	Arsenal	558	(11)
1993–1995	Leeds United	10	(0)
Total		568	(11)

International career
1976–1993	Republic of Ireland	68	(1)

Managerial career
- 1998–2002: Leeds United
- 2003–2006: Aston Villa
- 2010–2011: Al-Ahli
- * Club domestic league appearances and goals

David Anthony O'Leary (born 2 May 1958) is a football manager and former player. The majority of his 20-year playing career was spent as a central defender at Arsenal, where his tally of 722 appearances stands as a club record. He played 68 times for the Republic of Ireland from 1976 to 1993, and was part of the squad that reached the quarter-finals of the 1990 FIFA World Cup.

O'Leary retired as a player after two years at Leeds United, and began managing the club in 1998. He built a team of young talents, and reached the semi-finals of the UEFA Champions League in 2000–01 before being dismissed the following year. He also managed Aston Villa for three Premier League seasons and had one year in charge of Al Ahli Dubai.

== Club career ==
O'Leary was born in Stoke Newington, London, on 2 May 1958, and moved to live in Dublin in 1961.

=== Arsenal ===
O'Leary had two weeks on trial at Manchester United before signing for Arsenal as an apprentice in 1973. He made his debut against Burnley on 16 August 1975 in a 3–3 draw, and despite being only 17, went on to make 30 appearances that season. The following year, he signed a professional contract. For the next 10 years, he played more than 40 matches a season (except for 1980–81, when he was out with an ankle injury and only played 27).

A calm and collected central defender, O'Leary was noted for his good positioning and elegant style of play. He won his first major honour with Arsenal when he played in their 3–2 win over Manchester United in the 1979 FA Cup final. He also played in the 1978 and 1980 Cup finals, and the 1980 European Cup Winners' Cup final, all of which Arsenal lost. The same year, he was nominated for the Ballon d'Or. In 1982, O'Leary became club captain but relinquished it to Graham Rix 18 months later.

In 1981, O'Leary rejected a move to Manchester United and signed a four-year extension at Arsenal. He missed the loss to Luton Town in the 1988 Football League Cup final due to an Achilles tendon rupture. O'Leary broke numerous appearance records at Arsenal; he was the youngest person to reach the 100- and 200-match milestones, and he made his 400th appearance while still only 26. He passed George Armstrong's all-time record of 621 first-team games in November 1989. By this time, O'Leary was no longer automatic first choice (with the partnership of Tony Adams and Steve Bould at the centre of George Graham's defence), but he still made over 20 appearances as Arsenal won the 1988–89 First Division title due to a 2–0 win at Anfield on the final day of the season.

O'Leary won another league title in 1991 and an FA Cup and League Cup double in 1993, though by this time he was mainly used as a substitute. He holds Arsenal's all-time record for appearances, with 722 first-team games, in a 20-year-long association with the club. In a poll to compile the list of the club's greatest-ever players, O'Leary was voted 14th. O'Leary assumes the role of a club ambassador for Arsenal.

=== Leeds United ===
O'Leary joined Leeds on a free transfer in 1993 after 19 years at Highbury. He retired due to another Achilles injury in 1995, after only 12 appearances. O'Leary was never sent off in a professional match.

== International career ==
O'Leary's international debut with the Republic of Ireland came as a teenager in a 1–1 friendly draw with England on 8 September 1976. Following the appointment of Jack Charlton, O'Leary was frozen out of the international setup for two years. After being left out of a squad for a mini tournament in Iceland in May 1986, O'Leary booked a family holiday, which he decided not to cancel when he was eventually asked up to the squad following several withdrawals. O'Leary did not feature until November 1988, thus missing out on Euro 88.

The highlight of his 68-cap international career came in the 1990 World Cup. With Ireland in a penalty shootout with Romania, Packie Bonner saved Daniel Timofte's last penalty. O'Leary then stepped up to take the decisive final penalty to win the shootout 5–4 to take Ireland to the quarterfinals. O'Leary's strike has since been voted as the greatest moment in Irish footballing history.

On 17 October 1990, O'Leary scored his only goal for the Republic of Ireland in a 5–0 win over Turkey in a Euro 92 qualifier. O'Leary was captain in his final international game on 17 February 1993, but was injured in the opening minutes of the 2–1 friendly win over Wales at Tolka Park.

== Managerial career ==
=== Leeds United ===
When the former Arsenal manager George Graham was put in charge at Leeds United in September 1996, O'Leary was installed as his assistant. He remained in this position for two years.

On 29 September 1998, in Graham's last match as manager, O'Leary was sent off for arguing with match officials in a UEFA Cup first-round game away to C.S. Marítimo, which Leeds won on penalties. Graham left for Tottenham Hotspur, and on O'Leary's debut as caretaker on 3 October, Leeds lost 1–0 at home to Leicester City, managed by Martin O'Neill who was linked with the Leeds job. After a goalless draw with Chelsea at Elland Road on 25 October, chairman Peter Ridsdale gave the job permanently to O'Leary on a 2 1/2-year deal for a salary of £600,000, then one of the highest salaries for managers in England.

At the end of the 1998–99 season, Leeds finished fourth in the Premier League and qualified for the UEFA Cup. Their 1999-2000 UEFA Cup campaign ended in the semifinal with defeat to the Turkish side Galatasaray, following the murders of two Leeds fans during violence the night before. On the domestic front, Leeds finished third in the Premier League and qualified for the Champions League. It was their first campaign at this level since the 1992–93 season. In August 2000, O'Leary signed a six-year contract, for which he would earn £10 million.

Leeds reached the semifinals of the Champions League in 2000-01, where they lost to eventual runners-up Valencia. Their Premier League form also dipped slightly and O'Leary's men had to settle for a UEFA Cup place, finishing fourth in the last season before the Champions League qualification spots for the English Premiership expanded from the top three to the top four. Although there was little indication of this at the time, this was a serious failure for the club because Ridsdale had borrowed £60 million against future gate receipts, budgeting for prolonged Champions League involvement.

The 2001–02 season began well for Leeds. They frequently topped the table during the first half of the season and were Premier League leaders on 1 January 2002, but a loss of form in the second half of the season had them slump into fifth place, again just outside the Champions League qualification spots, meaning that they would again have to settle for a UEFA Cup place.

Leeds players Jonathan Woodgate and Lee Bowyer were charged in an incident in Leeds city centre in January 2000, in which a man was beaten in what he believed was a racially motivated attack. In December 2001, Woodgate was convicted of affray and received 100 hours of community service, while Bowyer was acquitted. In January 2002, O'Leary wrote a book, Leeds United on Trial. In it, he revealed that the club hired private investigators in the Bowyer and Woodgate affair, and said that he felt the police wanted to "put one over the club"; he also criticised The Football Association for freezing the pair out of England squads until the end of the trial. He also alleged that Jimmy Floyd Hasselbaink refused to play unless he could be the highest-paid player at the club.

By June 2002, O'Leary had spent almost £100 million on new players in less than four years for no reward in terms of trophies, but he had never finished outside the top five as a manager. Ridsdale dismissed O'Leary as Leeds manager in the summer of 2002, replacing him with Terry Venables. O'Leary's departure signalled a downhill spiral for the club – highly attributable to the financial state that saw the sale of several key players, which saw three more managers (Venables, Peter Reid, and Eddie Gray) come and go before the club was finally relegated from the Premier League in 2004 with £80 million debt, and fell into League One (the third tier of the league) three years later. This fall from grace led to the phrase "doing a Leeds".

O'Leary's fame at Leeds rests upon his promotion of a series of younger players such as Woodgate, Bowyer, Alan Smith, Harry Kewell, Stephen McPhail, Eirik Bakke, Ian Harte, and Danny Mills (signed for £4 million from Charlton Athletic). He promoted several members of the youth team into an exciting Leeds side that played a pressing game relying on youthful enthusiasm. In a 2007 interview regarding the decline of Leeds, O'Leary stated, "I never wanted to leave Leeds. The fans are fantastic to me here. I hope they stay up because I had great times at the club."

O'Leary was dismissed with two years remaining of his contract and sued for compensation as the club claimed he had left by mutual consent. He settled with the club for £2 million and legal costs in February 2003.

=== Aston Villa ===
After settling his case with Leeds, O'Leary was linked with Sunderland who had sacked Howard Wilkinson in March 2003. On 21 May, he signed a three-year deal at Aston Villa, who had finished 16th under Graham Taylor. O'Leary targeted 6th place within two years. His first game on 16 August was a 2–1 loss at newly promoted Portsmouth; The Guardian journalist Russell Thomas wrote "Punters who have already wagered on Portsmouth going down might now consider covering themselves by entering Aston Villa into the equation".

In January 2004, O'Leary criticised chairman Doug Ellis for a lack of funding for transfers, as Villa had let go of 13 players while only signing Sunderland duo Thomas Sørensen and Gavin McCann for a combined £4.5 million; forward Dion Dublin had been playing in central defence. The team finished in sixth place – one place too low for European qualification due to Millwall's FA Cup final appearance and Middlesbrough's League Cup triumph.

O'Leary signed AC Milan's international defender Martin Laursen, Carlton Cole from Chelsea, and French midfielder Mathieu Berson ahead of the 2004–05 season, in which Villa finished 10th in the league. Despite six summer acquisitions including strikers Milan Baroš and Kevin Phillips, Villa finished 16th in 2005–06, just two places above the relegation zone. Following the relegation of local rivals Birmingham City and Bromwich Albion, Villa were the only Midlands side playing Premier League football in 2006–07.

On 19 July 2006, O'Leary's contract as Aston Villa manager was terminated by mutual consent, after an investigation into a statement against Ellis allegedly given by the squad. Ellis sold the club within a few days to Randy Lerner, and Martin O'Neill was appointed as manager.

=== Al-Ahli ===
O'Leary returned to management on 4 July 2010 with United Arab Emirates club Al-Ahli Dubai, where World Cup-winning Italy captain Fabio Cannavaro was signed and made skipper.

On 2 April 2011, O'Leary was relieved of his duties following a 5–1 defeat against Al Jazira. On 22 April 2011, Al-Ahli officially announced its decision to dismiss O'Leary with his assistant coach Roy Aitken. When he was dismissed, O'Leary had two years remaining on a three-year contract. In March 2012, he asked FIFA for help in receiving compensation from Al-Ahli for the early termination of his contract. In May 2013, he won $5.2 million (£3.34 million) compensation. The dispute was settled by FIFA's players' status committee. Al-Ahli claimed O'Leary had abandoned his post, despite previously stating he had been dismissed. O'Leary had won six of his 15 league games in charge.

== Personal life ==
O'Leary's father was an avid Arsenal supporter who had left Ireland to work in London as a contractor, and was later proud that his son chose Arsenal instead of Manchester United, who had also offered him terms to sign for them. O'Leary is a UK resident according to current UK Companies House documents, and maintains links to Yorkshire. He has been married to wife Joy for more than forty years. In 2002 she was the subject of hate mail during a failed CPS prosecution of two Leeds football players. The couple have two children together.

O'Leary's brother, Pierce, played for Shamrock Rovers and Celtic, and was capped seven times for the Republic of Ireland. His nephew, Ryan, declined to play for the Republic of Ireland Under-21s, choosing to play for Scotland, the country of his birth.

O'Leary endorsed a Game Boy Color game called O'Leary Manager 2000, which was released by Ubi Soft in 2000.

O'Leary was involved in a complex tax avoidance scheme, O'Leary v. McKinlay (Inspector of Taxes), that was struck down in the Chancery Court in December 1990. The scheme involved the loan of £266,000 (equivalent to £657,790 in 2025) by Arsenal, O'Leary's club, to trustees in Jersey, where it was held for his benefit.

== Playing statistics ==
=== Club ===
Appearances and goals by club, season and competition
Club	Season	League			FA Cup		League Cup		Europe		Total	
Club	Season	Division	Apps	Goals	Apps	Goals	Apps	Goals	Apps	Goals	Apps	Goals
Arsenal	1975–76	First Division	27	0	1	0	2	0	—		30	0
Arsenal	1976–77	First Division	33	2	3	0	4	1	—		40	3
Arsenal	1977–78	First Division	41	1	6	1	6	0	—		53	2
Arsenal	1978–79	First Division	37	2	11	0	1	0	5	0	54	2
Arsenal	1979–80	First Division	34	1	9	0	6	0	9	0	58	1
Arsenal	1980–81	First Division	24	1	1	0	2	0	—		27	1
Arsenal	1981–82	First Division	40	1	1	0	5	0	4	0	50	1
Arsenal	1982–83	First Division	36	1	5	0	7	0	2	0	50	1
Arsenal	1983–84	First Division	36	0	1	0	4	0	—		41	0
Arsenal	1984–85	First Division	36	0	3	0	3	0	—		42	0
Arsenal	1985–86	First Division	35	0	5	0	7	0	—		47	0
Arsenal	1986–87	First Division	39	0	4	0	9	0	—		52	0
Arsenal	1987–88	First Division	23	0	4	0	6	1	—		33	1
Arsenal	1988–89	First Division	26	0	1	0	0	0	—		27	0
Arsenal	1989–90	First Division	34	1	3	0	4	0	—		41	1
Arsenal	1990–91	First Division	21	1	6	0	1	0	—		28	1
Arsenal	1991–92	First Division	25	0	1	0	1	0	0	0	27	0
Arsenal	1992–93	Premier League	11	0	4	0	1	0	—		16	0
Arsenal	Total		558	11	69	1	69	2	20	0	716	14
Leeds United	1993–94	Premier League	10	0	0	0	0	0	—		10	0
Leeds United	1994–95	Premier League	0	0	0	0	0	0	—		0	0
Leeds United	Total		10	0	0	0	0	0	—		10	0
Career total			568	11	69	1	69	2	20	0	726	14

=== International ===
Appearances and goals by national team and year
National team	Year	Apps	Goals
Republic of Ireland	1976	2	0
Republic of Ireland	1977	4	0
Republic of Ireland	1978	3	0
Republic of Ireland	1979	5	0
Republic of Ireland	1980	3	0
Republic of Ireland	1981	5	0
Republic of Ireland	1982	2	0
Republic of Ireland	1983	1	0
Republic of Ireland	1984	6	0
Republic of Ireland	1985	8	0
Republic of Ireland	1986	1	0
Republic of Ireland	1987	0	0
Republic of Ireland	1988	1	0
Republic of Ireland	1989	5	0
Republic of Ireland	1990	9	1
Republic of Ireland	1991	6	0
Republic of Ireland	1992	6	0
Republic of Ireland	1993	1	0
Total		68	1

== Managerial statistics ==
As of 22 October 2010

Team	Nat	From	To	Record						
Team	Nat	From	To	P	W	D	L	GF	GA	Win %
Leeds United	(England)	1 October 1998	27 June 2002	203	101	47	55	320	217	49.75
Aston Villa	(England)	20 May 2003	19 July 2006	131	47	35	49	172	176	35.88
Al-Ahli	(United Arab Emirates)	4 July 2010	22 April 2011	7	3	2	2	14	13	42.86
Total				341	151	84	106	506	406	44.28

- Al-Ahli: Only league games

== Honours ==
=== Player ===
Arsenal

- Football League First Division: 1988–89, 1990–91
- FA Cup: 1978–79, 1992–93; runner-up: 1977–78, 1979–80
- Football League Cup: 1986–87, 1992–93
- FA Charity Shield: 1991 (shared)

Individual

- PFA Team of the Year: 1978–79 First Division, 1979–80 First Division, 1981–82 First Division
- Ballon d'Or nominee: 1980 (22nd)

=== Manager ===
Individual

- Premier League Manager of the Month: March 1999, March 2001, April 2001

== See also ==
- List of Republic of Ireland international footballers born outside the Republic of Ireland
