= Paul Gorman (footballer, born 1963) =

Irish footballer

Personal information
- Full name: Paul Anthony Gorman
- Date of birth: 6 August 1963 (age 63)
- Place of birth: Dublin, Ireland
- Height: 5 ft 10 in (1.78 m)
- Position: Midfielder

Youth career
- 1979–1980: Arsenal

Senior career*
Years	Team	Apps	(Gls)
1980–1984	Arsenal	6	(0)
1984–1985	Birmingham City	6	(0)
1985–1989	Carlisle United	148	(7)
1989–1990	Shelbourne	6	(1)
1989	→ Shrewsbury Town (loan)	(Note: The Shrewsbury appearances and goals are his totals for the club, covering both the initial loan spell and the permanent contract)	
1989–1991	Shrewsbury Town	54	(1)
1991–1992	Carlisle United	5	(0)
1992–199?	Gretna		
- Carlisle City

International career
1983	Republic of Ireland U-21	1	(0)
- * Club domestic league appearances and goals

Paul Anthony Gorman (born 6 August 1963) is an Irish former professional footballer who made 219 appearances in the Football League playing for Arsenal, Birmingham City, Carlisle United and Shrewsbury Town. He played as a midfielder.

== Playing career ==
Gorman was born in Dublin. He signed for Arsenal as an apprentice in 1979, and turned professional in 1980. He made his Football League debut on 6 March 1982 in the First Division goalless draw away at Manchester City. While an Arsenal player he was capped for the Republic of Ireland at under-21 level. In all he played six league games, and contributed to Arsenal's reserve team winning the Football Combination in the 1983–84 season, before he was released by the club and signed for Birmingham City. Gorman failed to cope with Birmingham's long ball style, and after only nine months with the club in which he played seven first-team games in all competitions, he joined Carlisle United for a fee of £10,000.

Gorman remained at Carlisle for four and a half years, playing 148 league games. In his first three seasons the club dropped from the Second Division to one place above the bottom of the Fourth. The 1988–89 season was described as Gorman's best with the club: he played 49 games in all competitions in a central midfield position and scored eight goals as Carlisle stabilised themselves in mid-table. The following season Gorman played only twice for Carlisle because of injury,

Gorman then came home to sign for Shelbourne and made his League of Ireland debut against Athlone Town A.F.C. on 16 October. In his last game he scored his only goal against Shamrock Rovers on 12 November at Tolka Park.

He then joined Shrewsbury Town, initially on loan. The transfer was made permanent in December for a fee of £20,000, and Gorman spent two years with the club before returning briefly to Carlisle.

Released in 1992, he moved on to Scottish club Gretna, then playing in the English football league system and newly promoted to the Northern Premier League Division One. He was part of the Gretna team that reached the First Round Proper of the 1994 FA Cup in which they led Division One (second tier) club Bolton Wanderers until near the end of the match. He also played for Carlisle City.

== After football ==
After finishing playing, Gorman settled in the Carlisle area and worked as a security officer. He takes an active interest in Carlisle United, and has appeared for their teams in charity matches.
