= George Wood (footballer) =

Scottish footballer

Personal information
- Full name: George Wood
- Date of birth: 26 September 1952 (age 74)
- Place of birth: Douglas, Scotland
- Height: 6 ft 3 in (1.91 m)
- Position: Goalkeeper

Youth career
- Forth Wanderers

Senior career*
Years	Team	Apps	(Gls)
1970–1971	East Stirlingshire	43	(1)
1971–1977	Blackpool	117	(0)
1977–1980	Everton	103	(0)
1980–1983	Arsenal	60	(0)
1983–1987	Crystal Palace	192	(0)
1987–1990	Cardiff City	67	(0)
1989–1990	→ Blackpool (loan)	15	(0)
1990–1991	Hereford United	41	(0)
1991–1992	Merthyr Tydfil	11	(0)
1992–1997	Inter Cardiff	127	(0)
Total		776	(1)

International career
1979–1982	Scotland	4	(0)

Managerial career
- Inter Cardiff
- * Club domestic league appearances and goals

George Wood (born 26 September 1952) is a Scottish former footballer who played as a goalkeeper. He played in the Scottish League for East Stirlingshire and in the English Football League for Blackpool, Everton, Arsenal, Crystal Palace, Cardiff City and Hereford United, before moving into Non-League football in Wales.

Wood was capped four times for Scotland, and was a member of their squad for the 1982 FIFA World Cup.

== Club career ==
Wood started his career at East Stirlingshire for whom he scored a goal from his own penalty area against Queen of the South on 9 January 1971.

He moved to Blackpool in 1972 for £10,000 – made up of an initial £7,000, followed by another £3,000 after twelve appearances – as cover for John Burridge. After spending time in the reserves, Wood made his debut on 15 April 1972, in a 2–0 home victory over Oxford United. He then spent the next four years jostling for the No. 1 jersey with Burridge, eventually establishing himself in 1975–76 after Burridge was sold to Aston Villa.

Wood was signed by First Division club Everton for £150,000 on 18 August 1977. He was their first-choice goalkeeper for the next two-and-a-half seasons, making over 120 appearances for the Toffees.

He joined Arsenal in August 1980 for £140,000, as potential successor to Pat Jennings with whom he shared the first-team goalkeeper's spot for the next two seasons. Jennings' longevity counted against Wood, and, as he was unable to supplant the Irish veteran, Wood was given a free transfer in May 1983 having made 60 league appearances in goal for Arsenal.

He was then signed by Crystal Palace, and was their first choice keeper for the next four-and-a-half seasons. Wood made 192 league appearances for Palace, which included nearly three seasons ever-present, and won the club's Player of the Year award in 1986.

Wood moved on to Cardiff City in January 1988, where he made 67 league appearances. He spent time on loan with Blackpool in 1990, and ended his league career with Hereford United in the 1990–91 season. Stints followed afterward at non-league sides Merthyr Tydfil, for whom he made 11 appearances in the 1991–92 Football Conference, and Inter Cardiff of the League of Wales. Wood stayed with Inter Cardiff for several years, both playing for and managing them in European competition.

== International career ==
Wood was in competition with Alan Rough and later with Billy Thomson and Jim Leighton for a place in the Scotland team. He made his debut in a 1–0 win against Northern Ireland in the 1978–79 Home Internationals on 22 May 1979. He played twice more that year, and made his fourth and final senior appearance on 28 April 1982, also in the Home Internationals against Northern Ireland. Wood was also a member of Scotland's squad for the 1982 World Cup in Spain.

== Coaching ==
He went on to coach goalkeepers at several league clubs, starting with Cardiff City and Hartlepool United. In June 2009, he joined Swindon Town, and returning for a third spell with Blackpool in August 2011. In December 2012 he moved on to another of his former clubs, Crystal Palace, where he remained for two-and-a-half seasons.

== Honours ==
=== Club ===
- Cardiff City
  - Fourth Division: promotion 1987–88
  - Welsh Cup: 1987–88

=== Individual ===
- PFA Second Division Team of the Year: 1976–77
- Crystal Palace F.C. Player of the Year: 1986
