= Alan Sunderland =

English footballer

Personal information
- Full name: Alan Sunderland
- Date of birth: 1 July 1953 (age 73)
- Place of birth: Conisbrough, England
- Height: 5 ft 9 in (1.75 m)
- Position: Forward

Youth career
- 1969–1971: Wolverhampton Wanderers

Senior career*
Years	Team	Apps	(Gls)
1971–1977	Wolverhampton Wanderers	158	(30)
1977–1984	Arsenal	206	(55)
1984	→ Ipswich Town (loan)	15	(3)
1984–1986	Ipswich Town	43	(8)
1987	Derry City	4	(2)
Total		426	(98)

International career
1974	England U23	1	(0)
1976	England U21	1	(0)
1978–1981	England B	7	(1)
1980	England	1	(0)

Managerial career
- 1996–1997: Birkirkara
- * Club domestic league appearances and goals

Alan Sunderland (born 1 July 1953) is an English former professional footballer who played as a forward in the Football League for Wolverhampton Wanderers, Arsenal and Ipswich Town. He was also capped once for England.

== Club career ==
Sunderland was born in Conisbrough, Yorkshire, and began his career at Wolverhampton Wanderers as an apprentice who played in midfield. With Wolves he won the 1974 League Cup in a 2–1 win over Manchester City in the final at Wembley. Sunderland also won the Second Division title in 1977 with Wolves. Altogether he made just under 200 appearances and scored 30 goals for the Midlands side.

In November 1977, he joined Arsenal for £220,000. Whilst at Highbury he switched from a midfield position to a forward role. Sunderland became a regular starter for the club, playing in the 1978 FA Cup final, which Arsenal lost to Ipswich Town.

Sunderland's most famous moment came in the 1979 FA Cup final. During the game Arsenal had gone 2–0 up against Manchester United, with goals from Brian Talbot and Frank Stapleton, and looked set for victory with only five minutes remaining. However, United scored twice in three minutes, with goals from Gordon McQueen and Sammy McIlroy, and extra time loomed. In the very last minute of the match, however, Arsenal pushed forward in a desperate counter-attack. Liam Brady fed Graham Rix on the left wing, and his cross was converted by Sunderland at the far post to make the score 3–2, and win Arsenal the cup.

Sunderland stayed at Arsenal for another five years, forming an impressive partnership with Frank Stapleton for two seasons. He was the club's top scorer in 1979–80 and 1981–82, and featured in the Arsenal sides that lost the 1980 FA Cup and Cup Winners' Cup finals.

However, after a spate of injuries and the arrivals of Tony Woodcock and Charlie Nicholas, he found himself out of the first team. Sunderland eventually left Arsenal after netting 92 goals from 281 appearances for the Gunners. He then joined Ipswich Town on loan in February 1984. He helped them to avoid relegation from the First Division, and made the move permanent later in the summer. He played for Ipswich until 1986, then had a brief stint at Irish club Derry City, before retiring.

== International career ==
Sunderland won a single England cap which came in a 2–1 friendly win over Australia in Sydney on 31 May 1980, and also represented his country at under-21 (as an over-age player), under-23 and 'B' team level.

== Personal life ==
Following retirement, Sunderland opened a pub in Ipswich. He eventually emigrated to Malta where he coached Birkirkara F.C. based within the town of Birkirkara.

== Honours ==
Wolverhampton Wanderers

- Football League Second Division: 1976–77
- Football League Cup: 1973–74

Arsenal

- FA Cup: 1978–79; runner-up: 1977–78, 1979–80
