= Frank Stapleton =

Irish football player, manager (born 1956)

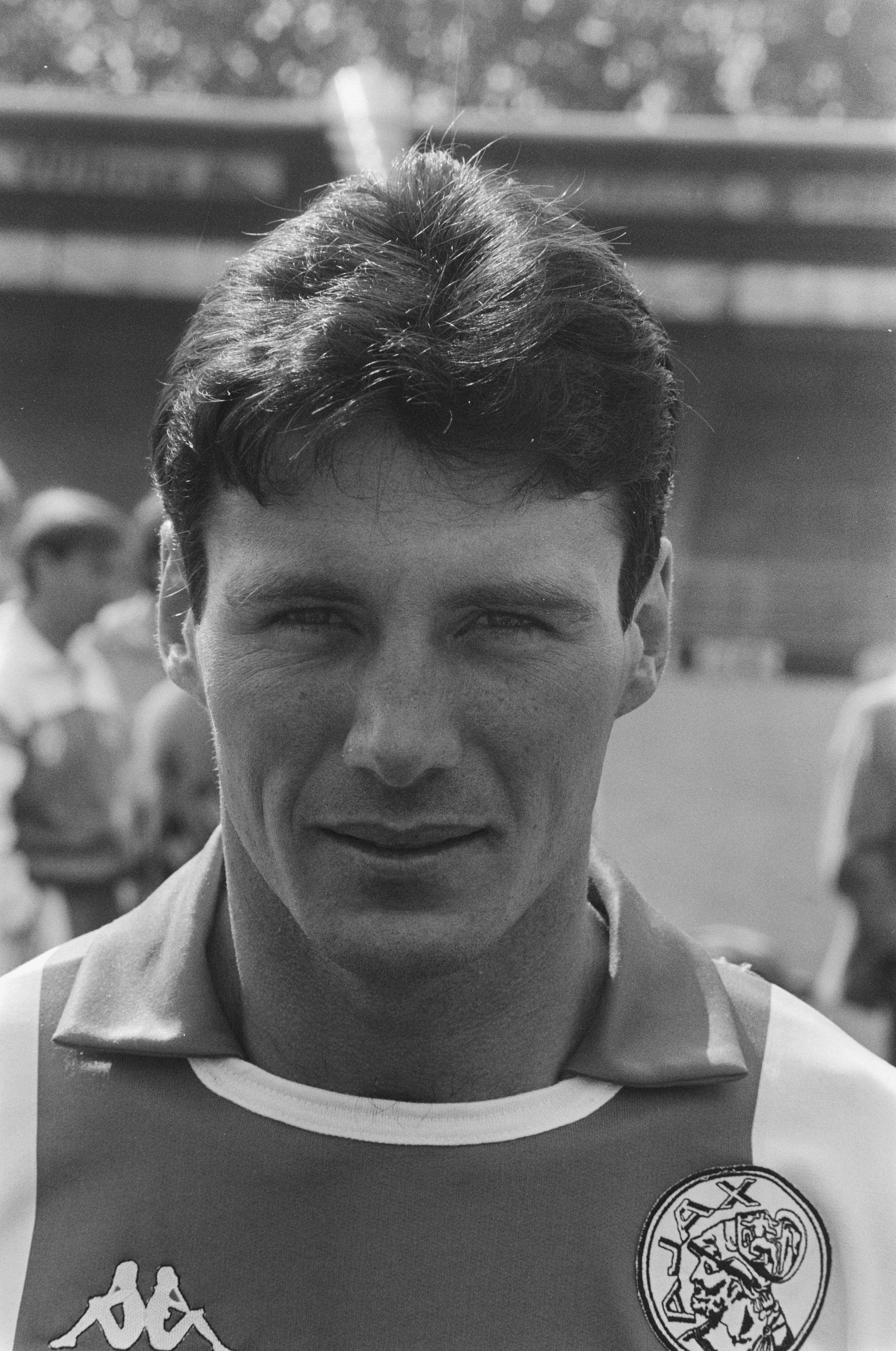
- Stapleton in 1987

Personal information
- Full name: Francis Anthony Stapleton
- Date of birth: 10 July 1956 (age 70)
- Place of birth: Artane, Dublin, Ireland
- Height: 1.80 m (5 ft 11 in)
- Position: Forward

Youth career
- St Martin's Dublin
- Bolton Athletic Dublin
- 1972–1975: Arsenal

Senior career*
Years	Team	Apps	(Gls)
1975–1981	Arsenal	225	(75)
1981–1987	Manchester United	223	(60)
1987–1988	Ajax	4	(0)
1988	→ Derby County (loan)	10	(1)
1988–1989	Le Havre	18	(5)
1989–1991	Blackburn Rovers	81	(13)
1991	Aldershot	1	(0)
1991	Huddersfield Town	5	(0)
1991–1994	Bradford City	68	(2)
1994	Brighton & Hove Albion	2	(0)
Total		637	(156)

International career
1976–1990	Republic of Ireland	71	(20)

Managerial career
- 1991–1994: Bradford City
- 1996: New England Revolution
- 2014–2015: Jordan (assistant)
- * Club domestic league appearances and goals

Francis Anthony Stapleton (born 10 July 1956) is an Irish former professional football player and manager. He is best remembered for his time at Arsenal, Manchester United and as a pivotal player for the Republic of Ireland national team. He has also been manager at Bradford City and MLS club New England Revolution.

== Club career ==
Stapleton was a distinguished centre forward, once touted as being among the best in the world in his position, and an exceptionally strong header of the ball. He started his career with Arsenal, joining them in 1972 as an apprentice, after being turned down by Manchester United. He made his first-team debut in March 1975, at home to Stoke City, and would go on to form a potent striking partnership with Malcolm Macdonald; the two scored 46 goals between them in 1976–77. He was Arsenal's top scorer for the three following seasons, and helped the Gunners reach a trio of FA Cup finals; Stapleton scored one of the goals in Arsenal's 1979 FA Cup Final 3–2 win over Manchester United, and scored 108 goals in 300 appearances in total for the Gunners.

Stapleton moved to Manchester United in the summer of 1981 for £900,000 (a fee set by tribunal after the two clubs could not agree) as new manager Ron Atkinson began building a team capable of challenging for silverware after a disappointing 1980–81 season under Dave Sexton. Stapleton helped United win the 1983 and 1985 FA Cups. It was in the first of those finals, when he scored against Brighton, in which Stapleton made history by becoming the first man to score for two different clubs in FA Cup Finals. United finished in the top four of the league in each of Stapleton's first five seasons at Old Trafford. In the 1985–86 season United won their first ten league games of the season before their form slumped and they finished fourth. Atkinson was dismissed and replaced by Alex Ferguson in November 1986, and Stapleton remained a regular member of the first team under the new manager. By the time of his departure from United, Stapleton became the highest ever Irish goalscorer in top flight English football.

Stapleton moved to Ajax on the recommendation of former teammate, Arnold Mühren, in the summer of 1987. But the move failed to live up to expectations, as Stapleton made just six appearances and scored one goal against Dundalk in the Cup Winners Cup. Stapleton then played on loan for three months with Derby County before heading to the European Championships in 1988 as the captain of the Republic of Ireland side, which defeated England, drew 1–1 with the Soviet Union, eventual runners-up, and lost by a single late goal to tournament winners, the Netherlands. He then played for French club Le Havre for a season, before returning to England with Blackburn Rovers in 1989, followed by moves to Aldershot, Huddersfield Town (as player-coach) and Bradford City.

After three seasons as player-manager at Bradford, he was dismissed following their narrow failure to qualify for the Division Two playoffs at the end of the 1993–94 season. He then had a brief spell at Brighton & Hove Albion in the 1994–95 season, playing two games before finally announcing his retirement as a player.

== International career ==
Stapleton gained 71 caps for the Republic of Ireland national team, scoring a then record 20 goals. He made his international debut under then player-manager Johnny Giles in a friendly match against Turkey in Ankara in 1976 at 20 years of age. He scored after only three minutes of his debut when he headed home a Giles free-kick at the near post in a 3–3 draw.

Stapleton was committed to international football insisting that an "international release clause" be inserted to all of his contracts so that he could be released to play in international games for Ireland.

Stapleton played a significant role in Ireland's attempt to qualify for the World Cup in Spain in 1982. Goals against Cyprus, the Netherlands and France for Stapleton in the qualifying matches were not enough as Ireland were denied a place at the World Cup by a superior French goal difference. Stapleton was made captain of the national team for the qualifying campaign for the 1986 World Cup though Ireland failed to emulate their fine performance in the 1982 qualifiers.

Jack Charlton took over as the Irish manager in 1986 and he kept Stapleton as captain despite a sometimes uneasy relationship between the two men. Stapleton scored a diving header in the opening Euro 1988 qualifier against Belgium in a 2–2 draw at the Heysel Stadium, Brussels that September. He also scored in a 2–1 defeat by Bulgaria in Sofia on 1 April 1987, with another goal against Luxembourg in a 2–1 victory at Lansdowne Road the following September.

Stapleton captained the Irish team to the 1988 Euro finals and played in all of their matches during the competition including Ireland's victory against England.

After the 1988 European Championships, Stapleton remained on the fringe of the national team during qualification for World Cup Italia 1990 making just two appearances late in the campaign. By then, his 20 goals for the Republic had made him the national side's all-time leading goalscorer – a record which would be broken ten years later by Niall Quinn, who was in the early stages of his own international career when Stapleton bowed out of the international scene.

He did, however, score an 87th-minute goal against Malta in a 3–0 friendly in Valletta just prior to those finals in Italy.

== Managerial career ==
Stapleton moved to the United States to manage Major League Soccer side New England Revolution in 1996, becoming the club's first-ever manager on 4 January 1996. His Revolution side recorded their first-ever win on 20 April against the MetroStars, Stapleton's Revolution did not have a particularly successful inaugural campaign, finishing the season with 15 wins and 17 losses. Stapleton announced his resignation on 26 September.

In the 2003–04 season he briefly returned to English football as a specialist coach of Bolton Wanderers. The Bolton manager Sam Allardyce wanted Stapleton to enhance the skills of the strikers at the club and saw the Irishman as an ideal candidate, given his successful playing career.

Stapleton was appointed assistant manager to former teammate Ray Wilkins with Jordan on 3 September 2014.

== Personal life ==
His sister Helena played for the Republic of Ireland women's national football team in the 1980s

He is second cousin of Irish actor Barry Keoghan.

== Career statistics ==
=== Club ===
Appearances and goals by club, season and competition
Club	Season	League			National cup (Note: Includes FA Cup, KNVB Cup)		League Cup		Europe		Other		Total	
Club	Season	Division	Apps	Goals	Apps	Goals	Apps	Goals	Apps	Goals	Apps	Goals	Apps	Goals
Arsenal	1974–75	First Division	1	0	0	0	0	0	—		—		1	0
Arsenal	1975–76	First Division	25	4	1	0	2	1	—		—		28	5
Arsenal	1976–77	First Division	40	13	3	1	6	3	—		—		49	17
Arsenal	1977–78	First Division	39	13	5	4	7	2	—		—		51	19
Arsenal	1978–79	First Division	41	17	11	6	1	1	6 (Note: Appearances in UEFA Cup)	4	—		59	28
Arsenal	1979–80	First Division	39	14	11	4	7	5	9 (Note: Appearances in European Cup Winners' Cup)	0	1 (Note: Appearance in FA Charity Shield)	0	67	23
Arsenal	1980–81	First Division	40	14	1	0	4	2	—		—		45	16
Arsenal	Total		225	75	32	15	27	14	15	4	1	0	300	108
Manchester United	1981–82	First Division	41	13	1	0	2	0	—		—		44	13
Manchester United	1982–83	First Division	41	14	7	3	9	2	2	0	—		59	19
Manchester United	1983–84	First Division	42	13	1	0	6	2	8	4	1	0	58	19
Manchester United	1984–85	First Division	24	6	5	2	2	0	5	1	—		36	9
Manchester United	1985–86	First Division	41	7	5	2	4	0	—		4 (Note: One appearance in FA Charity Shield, three appearances and one goal in Football League Super Cup)	1	54	10
Manchester United	1986–87	First Division	34	7	2	0	4	2	—		—		40	9
Manchester United	Total		223	60	21	7	27	6	15	5	5	1	291	79
Ajax	1987–88	Eredivisie	4	0	0	0	—		2	1	—		6	1
Ajax 2	1987–88	—	—		1	0	—		—		—		1	0
Derby County (loan)	1987–88	First Division	10	1	—		—		—		—		10	1
Le Havre	1988–89	Division 2	18	5	0	0	—		—		1 (Note: Appearance in French Division 1 Promotion play-offs)	0	19	5
Blackburn Rovers	1989–90	Second Division	43	3	2	1	2	0	—		3 (Note: One appearance in Full Members' Cup, two appearances in Football League play-offs)	0	50	4
Blackburn Rovers	1990–91	Second Division	38	10	2	0	3	1	—		0	0	43	11
Blackburn Rovers	Total		81	13	4	1	5	1	0	0	3	0	93	15
Aldershot	1991–92	Fourth Division	1	0	0	0	0	0	—		0	0	1	0
Huddersfield Town	1991–92	Third Division	5	0	2	1	1	0	—		1 (Note: Appearances in Associate Members' Cup / Football League Trophy)	0	9	1
Bradford City	1991–92	Third Division	27	0	—		—		—		—		27	0
Bradford City	1992–93	Second Division	13	2	0	0	0	0	—		1	0	14	2
Bradford City	1993–94	Second Division	28	0	0	0	3	0	—		0	0	31	0
Bradford City	Total		68	2	0	0	3	0	0	0	1	0	72	2
Brighton & Hove Albion	1994–95	Second Division	2	0	0	0	0	0	—		0	0	2	0
Career total			637	156	60	24	63	21	32	10	12	1	804	212

=== International ===
Appearances and goals by national team and year
National team	Year	Apps	Goals
Republic of Ireland	1976	2	1
Republic of Ireland	1977	3	0
Republic of Ireland	1978	4	1
Republic of Ireland	1979	5	1
Republic of Ireland	1980	6	1
Republic of Ireland	1981	6	3
Republic of Ireland	1982	4	3
Republic of Ireland	1983	5	2
Republic of Ireland	1984	5	0
Republic of Ireland	1985	8	2
Republic of Ireland	1986	6	2
Republic of Ireland	1987	6	2
Republic of Ireland	1988	6	0
Republic of Ireland	1989	4	1
Republic of Ireland	1990	1	1
Total		71	20

Scores and results list Republic of Ireland's goal tally first, score column indicates score after each Stapleton goal.

List of international goals scored by Frank Stapleton
No.	Date	Venue	Opponent	Score	Result	Competition
1	13 October 1976	19 Mayıs Stadium, Ankara, Turkey	Turkey	1–0	3–3	Friendly
2	24 May 1978	Idrætsparken, Copenhagen, Denmark	Denmark	1–0	3–3	UEFA Euro 1980 qualifying
3	17 October 1979	Lansdowne Road, Dublin, Ireland	Bulgaria	3–0	3–0	UEFA Euro 1980 qualifying
4	19 November 1980	Lansdowne Road, Dublin, Ireland	Cyprus	5–0	6–0	1982 FIFA World Cup qualification
5	29 April 1981	Lansdowne Road, Dublin, Ireland	Czechoslovakia	3–1	3–1	Friendly
6	9 September 1981	De Kuip, Rotterdam, Netherlands	Netherlands	2–2	2–2	1982 FIFA World Cup qualification
7	14 October 1981	Lansdowne Road, Dublin, Ireland	France	2–1	3–2	1982 FIFA World Cup qualification
8	13 October 1982	Lansdowne Road, Dublin, Ireland	Iceland	1–0	2–0	UEFA Euro 1984 qualifying
9	17 November 1982	Lansdowne Road, Dublin, Ireland	Spain	2–3	3–3	UEFA Euro 1984 qualifying
10	17 November 1982	Lansdowne Road, Dublin, Ireland	Spain	3–3	3–3	UEFA Euro 1984 qualifying
11	30 March 1983	National Stadium, Ta' Qali, Malta	Malta	1–0	1–0	UEFA Euro 1984 qualifying
12	16 November 1983	Dalymount Park, Dublin, Ireland	Malta	2–0	8–0	UEFA Euro 1984 qualifying
13	2 June 1985	Lansdowne Road, Dublin, Ireland	Switzerland	1–0	3–0	1986 FIFA World Cup qualification
14	13 November 1985	Lansdowne Road, Dublin, Ireland	Denmark	1–0	1–4	1986 FIFA World Cup qualification
15	27 May 1986	Laugardalsvöllur, Reykjavík, Iceland	Czechoslovakia	1–0	1–0	Iceland Triangular Tournament
16	10 September 1986	Constant Vanden Stock Stadium, Brussels, Belgium	Belgium	1–1	2–2	UEFA Euro 1988 qualifying
17	1 April 1987	Vasil Levski National Stadium, Sofia, Bulgaria	Bulgaria	1–1	1–2	UEFA Euro 1988 qualifying
18	9 September 1987	Lansdowne Road, Dublin, Ireland	Luxembourg	1–1	2–1	UEFA Euro 1988 qualifying
19	6 September 1989	Lansdowne Road, Dublin, Ireland	West Germany	1–0	1–1	Friendly
20	2 June 1990	National Stadium, Ta' Qali, Malta	Malta	3–0	3–0	Friendly

== Honours ==
Arsenal

- FA Cup: 1978–79; runner-up: 1977–78, 1979–80

Manchester United

- FA Cup: 1982–83, 1984–85
- FA Charity Shield: 1983
- Football League Cup runner-up: 1982–83

Individual

- Arsenal Player of the Season: 1976–77, 1979–80
- PFA Team of the Year: 1983–84 First Division
