= 1985–86 Arsenal F.C. season =

English football club season

Arsenal F.C.
1985–86 season
- Chairman: Peter Hill-Wood
- Manager: Don Howe (to 22 March); Steve Burtenshaw (caretaker, for remainder of season)
- First Division: 7th
- FA Cup: Fifth round
- League Cup: Quarter-finals
- Top goalscorer: League: Tony Woodcock (11); All: Charlie Nicholas (18)
Home colours	Away colours

The 1985–86 season was Arsenal Football Club's 60th consecutive season in the top flight of English football. In this season Arsenal celebrated its centenary, 100 years of footballing history. Arsenal finished seventh in the Football League First Division and saw little success in cup competitions, falling unceremoniously to Aston Villa in the quarterfinals of the League Cup.

Arsenal saw a promising group of young talent break into the first team, with Martin Keown, Tony Adams, Niall Quinn, and David Rocastle all making regular appearances.

Don Howe resigned from Arsenal in March 1986. Steven Burtenshaw took over from Howe, overseeing a slide from fifth to seventh place. George Graham became manager at the end of the season.

== Season summary ==
After 4 consecutive wins in a run of 8 wins, 2 draws and 1 defeat in 11 games Don Howe resigned on 22 March 1986. With Arsenal on the fringes of the title race, rumours were abound that the Arsenal board had approached Terry Venables with a view to naming him as Don Howe’s successor. When Howe was unable to get clarity or reassurance from the board, he promptly resigned.

Howe was hardly a failure, as the Gunners had not finished lower than seventh in the First Division under his leadership, but in the absence of silverware his exit became inevitable. Adopting a lower public profile than his predecessor, Howe did not invest heavily in the transfer market, preferring to augment his squad by bringing through youngsters such as Tony Adams, David Rocastle and Niall Quinn, but he never attained the desired blend.

Steven Burtenshaw took over with the club 5th in the league. The momentum was immediately lost and with five defeats in the next seven games Arsenal slipped away from their challenging position. Once again, the domestic cups would see the Gunners fall short. In the F.A. Cup they fell in the fifth round, losing 3 – 0 to Luton Town at Kenilworth Road after a replay. In the League Cup, another replay saw Arsenal bow out at the quarter-final stage to Aston Villa. On 8 April 1986 Paul Mariner played his last league game for Arsenal against Nottingham Forest. In his final season he made just 5 starts and 7 sub appearances in league and cup but failed to score.

The crowds declined too. On 26 April 1986 when Arsenal met West Bromwich Albion at Highbury just 14,843 turned up. The 2-2 draw made it just one win in eight matches. On 3 May against Birmingham City Tony Woodcock scored his 11th and final league goal of the season. He was Arsenal’s top scorer, as he was the previous season when both he and Brian Talbot got 10 each. Only 6,234 were in the crowd at St.Andrew's to see it. Two days later Tony Woodcock played his last game for Arsenal, a 3-0 away defeat to Oxford. Then with the season over, Arsenal finishing in 7th, on 14 May 1986 George Graham became manager.

== Squad ==
Note: Flags indicate national team as defined under FIFA eligibility rules; some limited exceptions apply. Players may hold more than one non-FIFA nationality.

Pos.	Nation	Player
GK	ENG	John Lukic
DF	ENG	Viv Anderson
DF	ENG	Kenny Sansom
MF	ENG	Stewart Robson
DF	IRL	David O'Leary
DF	ENG	Martin Keown
MF	ENG	Ian Allinson
MF	ENG	Paul Davis
FW	SCO	Charlie Nicholas
FW	ENG	Tony Woodcock
MF	ENG	Graham Rix (captain)

Pos.	Nation	Player
DF	ENG	Tommy Caton
MF	ENG	Steve Williams
MF	ENG	David Rocastle
FW	ENG	Martin Hayes
DF	ENG	Tony Adams
FW	IRL	Niall Quinn
DF	ENG	Chris Whyte
FW	ENG	Paul Mariner
DF	ENG	Gus Caesar
GK	WAL	Rhys Wilmot

== Results ==
=== First Division ===
Pos	Team	Pld	W	D	L	GF	GA	GD	Pts	Qualification or relegation
5	Sheffield Wednesday (Note: Since Everton would have instead qualified for the European Cup Winners' Cup, UEFA Cup qualification would have been passed down to Sheffield Wednesday.)	42	21	10	11	63	54	+9	73	Disqualified from the UEFA Cup
6	Chelsea	42	20	11	11	57	56	+1	71	
7	Arsenal	42	20	9	13	49	47	+2	69	
8	Nottingham Forest	42	19	11	12	69	53	+16	68	
9	Luton Town	42	18	12	12	61	44	+17	66	

Source: World Football
Rules for classification: 1) Points; 2) Goal difference; 3) Goals scored
Notes:

17 August 1985 1	Liverpool	2–0	Arsenal	Liverpool
				Stadium: Anfield

20 August 1985 2	Arsenal	3–2	Southampton	London
				Stadium: Highbury

24 August 1985 3	Arsenal	1–2	Manchester United	London
				Stadium: Highbury

27 August 1985 4	Luton Town	2–2	Arsenal	Luton
				Stadium: Kenilworth Road

31 August 1985 5	Arsenal	1–0	Leicester City	London
				Stadium: Highbury

3 September 1985 6	Queen's Park Rangers	0–1	Arsenal	London
				Stadium: Loftus Road

7 September 1985 7	Coventry City	0–2	Arsenal	Coventry
				Stadium: Highfield Road

14 September 1985 8	Arsenal	1–0	Sheffield Wednesday	London
				Stadium: Highbury

21 September 1985 9	Chelsea	2–1	Arsenal	London
				Stadium: Stamford Bridge

28 September 1985 10	Arsenal	0–0	Newcastle United	London
				Stadium: Highbury

5 October 1985 11	Arsenal	3–2	Aston Villa	London
			Goal	Stadium: Highbury

12 October 1985 12	West Ham United	0–0	Arsenal	London
	Hayes pen.' Rocastle			Stadium: Upton Park

19 October 1985 13	Arsenal	1–0	Ipswich Town	London
				Stadium: Highbury

26 October 1985 14	Nottingham Forest	3–2	Arsenal	Nottingham
				Stadium: City Ground

2 November 1985 15	Arsenal	1–0	Manchester City	London
				Stadium: Highbury

9 November 1985 16	Everton	6–1	Arsenal	Liverpool
				Stadium: Goodison Park

16 November 1985 17	Arsenal	2–1	Oxford United	London
				Stadium: Highbury

23 November 1985 18	West Bromwich Albion	0–0	Arsenal	West Bromwich
				Stadium: The Hawthorns

30 November 1985 19	Arsenal	0–0	Birmingham City	London
				Stadium: Highbury

7 December 1985 20	Southampton	3–0	Arsenal	Southampton
				Stadium: The Dell

14 December 1985 21	Arsenal	2–0	Liverpool	London
				Stadium: Highbury

21 December 1985 22	Manchester United	0–1	Arsenal	Manchester
				Stadium: Old Trafford

28 December 1985 23	Arsenal	3–1	Queen's Park Rangers	London
				Stadium: Highbury

1 January 1986 24	Arsenal	0–0	Tottenham Hotspur	London
				Stadium: Highbury

18 January 1986 25	Leicester City	2–2	Arsenal	Leicester
				Stadium: Filbert Street

1 February 1986 26	Arsenal	2–1	Luton Town	London
				Stadium: Highbury

1 March 1986 27	Newcastle United	1–0	Arsenal	Newcastle upon Tyne
				Stadium: St James' Park

8 March 1986 28	Aston Villa	1–4	Arsenal	Birmingham
				Stadium: Villa Park

11 March 1986 29	Ipswich Town	1–2	Arsenal	Ipswich
				Stadium: Portman Road

15 March 1986 30	Arsenal	1–0	West Ham United	London
				Stadium: Highbury

22 March 1986 31	Arsenal	3–0	Coventry City	London
				Stadium: Highbury

29 March 1986 32	Tottenham Hotspur	1–0	Arsenal	London
				Stadium: White Hart Lane

31 March 1986 33	Arsenal	0–2	Watford	London
				Stadium: Highbury

1 April 1986 34	Watford	3–0	Arsenal	London
				Stadium: Vicarage Road

5 April 1986 35	Manchester City	0–1	Arsenal	Manchester
				Stadium: Maine Road

8 April 1986 36	Arsenal	1–1	Nottingham Forest	London
				Stadium: Highbury

12 April 1986 37	Arsenal	0–1	Everton	London
				Stadium: Highbury

16 April 1986 38	Sheffield Wednesday	2–0	Arsenal	Sheffield
				Stadium: Hillsborough

26 April 1986 39	Arsenal	2–2	West Bromwich Albion	London
				Stadium: Highbury; Attendance: 14,843

29 April 1986 40	Arsenal	2–0	Chelsea	London
				Stadium: Highbury; Attendance: 24,025

3 May 1986 41	Birmingham City	0–1	Arsenal	Birmingham
				Stadium: St Andrew's; Attendance: 6,234

5 May 1986 42	Oxford United	3–0	Arsenal	Oxford
				Stadium: Manor Ground; Attendance: 13,651

=== Football League Cup ===
25 September 1985 Second round (1st Leg)	Hereford United	0–0	Arsenal	Hereford
				Stadium: Edgar Street

8 October 1985 Second round (2nd Leg)	Arsenal	2–1 (2–1 agg.)	Hereford United	London
				Stadium: Highbury

30 October 1985 Third round	Manchester City	1–2	Arsenal	Manchester
				Stadium: Maine Road

19 November 1985 Fourth round	Arsenal	0–0	Southampton	London
				Stadium: Highbury

26 November 1985 Fourth round (replay)	Southampton	1–3	Arsenal	Southampton
				Stadium: The Dell, Southampton

22 January 1986 Fifth round	Aston Villa	1–1	Arsenal	Birmingham
				Stadium: Villa Park

4 February 1986 Fifth round (replay)	Arsenal	1–2	Aston Villa	London
				Stadium: Highbury

=== FA Cup ===
Arsenal entered the FA Cup in the third round proper, in which they were drawn to face Grimsby Town.

4 January 1986 Third round	Grimsby Town	3–4	Arsenal	Grimsby
				Stadium: Blundel Park

25 January 1986 Fourth round	Arsenal	5–1	Rotherham United	London
				Stadium: Highbury

15 February 1986 Fifth round	Luton Town	2–2	Arsenal	Luton
				Stadium: Kenilworth Road

3 March 1986 Fifth round (replay)	Arsenal	0–0	Luton Town	London
				Stadium: Highbury

5 March 1986 Fifth round (2nd replay)	Luton Town	3–0	Arsenal	Luton
				Stadium: Kenilworth Road

== Top scorers ==
=== First Division ===
- (England) Tony Woodcock 11
- (Scotland) Charlie Nicholas 10
- (England) Ian Allinson 6
- (England) Paul Davis 4
- (England) Stewart Robson 4
