= 1985–86 in English football =

Football in England
- Season: 1985–86

Men's football
- First Division: Liverpool
- Second Division: Norwich City
- Third Division: Reading
- Fourth Division: Swindon Town
- Alliance Premier League: Enfield
- FA Cup: Liverpool
- Associate Members' Cup: Bristol City
- League Cup: Oxford United
- Charity Shield: Everton

The 1985–86 season was the 106th season of competitive football in England.

== Timeline ==
- 5 July 1985: Everton signed England striker Gary Lineker for £800,000.
- 10 July 1985: Everton sold striker Andy Gray to Aston Villa for £150,000, six years after he first left Villa Park to sign for Wolverhampton Wanderers. Gray departed from Goodison Park despite calls for manager Howard Kendall to retain him, as he helped Everton win three major trophies in his two seasons at the club.
- 12 July 1985: West Bromwich Albion signed striker Imre Varadi from Sheffield Wednesday for £285,000.
- 2 August 1985: Crystal Palace signed striker Ian Wright from Greenwich Borough.
- 10 August 1985: Everton beat Manchester United 2–0 in the FA Charity Shield at Wembley.
- 12 August 1985: Sheffield Wednesday signed striker Garry Thompson from West Bromwich Albion for £450,000.
- 17 August 1985: The league season began. Defending champions Everton suffered a 3–1 defeat to Leicester City on Filbert Street. FA Cup holders Manchester United beat Aston Villa 4–0 at Old Trafford. Tottenham Hotspur beat Watford 4–0 at White Hart Lane. Wimbledon won 3–0 against Middlesbrough, while Huddersfield Town beat Millwall 4–3 at Leeds Road. The season began without any live coverage of matches on TV after talks between ITV and the Football League to show live matches failed. International matches were the only matches shown on live TV.
- 24 August 1985: Oxford United achieved their first win in the First Division with a 5–0 victory over Leicester City at the Manor Ground. Watford beat West Bromwich Albion 5–1 at Vicarage Road. Manchester United were the only team in the First Division with a 100% record after three games, having beaten Arsenal 2–1 at Highbury. Sheffield Wednesday won 3–1 against Manchester City at Maine Road.
- 26 August 1985: Liverpool beat Ipswich Town 5–0 at Anfield in the First Division. Newcastle United won 2–1 against Coventry City. Leeds United lost 6–2 to Stoke City.
- 31 August 1985: Manchester United led the league after five straight wins, with Sheffield Wednesday in second place, while Chelsea and Newcastle United filled the next two places. Everton climbed to fifth as Lineker scored a hat-trick in a 4–1 win over Birmingham City at Goodison Park. In the Second Division, Portsmouth headed the promotion race, joined in the top three by Blackburn Rovers and Oldham Athletic.
- 4 September 1985: Manchester United won 3–0 against Newcastle United, Tottenham beat Chelsea 4–1 at White Hart Lane, Leicester and Watford drew 2–2 at Filbert Street, Aston Villa won 3–0 against West Bromwich Albion.
- 7 September 1985: Manchester United won 3–0 against Oxford United at Old Trafford. Liverpool won 3–1 against Watford. Everton lost 3–0 to Queens Park Rangers at Loftus Road. Tottenham beat Newcastle 5–1 at White Hart Lane. Down in the Second Division, Sunderland drew 3–3 with Grimsby Town at Roker Park.
- 8 September 1985: Nottingham Forest beat Leicester City 3-0 at Filbert Street.
- 10 September 1985: Scotland manager Jock Stein, 62, died at the end of a 1–1 draw between Scotland and Wales in the last game of the World Cup qualifying campaign at Ninian Park.
- 13 September 1985: Sheffield Wednesday signed winger Mark Chamberlain from Stoke City for £300,000.
- 14 September 1985: In the Manchester derby, Manchester United won 3–0 at Maine Road. Liverpool drew 2–2 with Oxford United at the Manor Ground. Arsenal won 1–0 at home against Sheffield Wednesday.
- 18 September 1985: Norwich City won 4–3 against Crystal Palace at Carrow Road.
- 21 September 1985: Manchester United won 5–1 against West Bromwich Albion at The Hawthorns in the First Division. Tottenham's beat Sheffield Wednesday 5-1, and move up to fifth place. Liverpool won the Merseyside derby 3–2 at Goodison Park.
- 28 September 1985: Charlton Athletic left The Valley after an inspection report by safety officials, and began a groundshare with Crystal Palace. Manchester United won their tenth game against Southampton at Old Trafford. Liverpool beat Tottenham 4–1 at Anfield. Chelsea lost 3–1 at Watford.
- 29 September 1985: West Bromwich Albion sacked Johnny Giles as manager and replaced him with Nobby Stiles.
- 1 October 1985: Ipswich Town, UEFA Cup winners in 1981 and league runners-up as recently as 1982, lost 1–0 against Luton Town.
- 2 October 1985: Leicester and Oxford drew 4–4 in the First Division at Filbert Street.
- 5 October 1985: Manchester United drew 1–1 against Luton Town, one game short of the record 11-match winning start set by Tottenham in 1960. Liverpool lost 2–1 to Queens Park Rangers. Chelsea won 1–0 against Manchester City at Maine Road. West Bromwich Albion drew 1–1 with Tottenham. In the Second Division Brighton beat Carlisle United 6–1 at the Goldstone Ground.
- 6 October 1985: Coventry City beat Leicester City 3–0 in the First Division at Highfield Road.
- 8 October 1985: Aston Villa beat Exeter City 8–1 at Villa Park. Liverpool won 5–2 against Oldham Athletic in their second leg visit to Boundary Park, making it 8–2 over the two legs.
- 11 October 1985: Leeds United sacked manager Eddie Gray and replaced him with former club captain Billy Bremner, who was recruited from Third Division side Doncaster Rovers.
- 12 October 1985: Reading set a football league record of winning their first 12 league games of the season, beating Newport County 2–0 at Somerton Park in the Third Division. Sheffield Wednesday drew 2–2 with Coventry City, and Everton lost 2–1 to Chelsea. West Bromwich Albion drew 2–2 with Leicester.
- 17 October 1985: Southampton signed midfielder Glenn Cockerill from Sheffield United for £225,000.
- 19 October 1985: Reading won 1–0 against Lincoln City at Sincil Bank. In the First Division, Manchester United and Liverpool drew 1–1 at Old Trafford. Chelsea lost 2–1 to Oxford. Sheffield Wednesday beat Leicester City 3–2 at Filbert Street. Luton Town won 7–0 against Southampton at Kenilworth Road. West Ham won 4–1 at home against Aston Villa. West Bromwich Albion won 2–1 against Birmingham City at The Hawthorns. Charlton beat Brighton 5–3.
- 20 October 1985: Tottenham were in seventh place in the First Division after winning 3–2 against Coventry City.
- 22 October 1985: In the Second Division, Sunderland beat Middlesbrough 1–0 at Roker Park.
- 23 October 1985: Reading drew 2–2 at home with Wolverhampton Wanderers.
- 26 October 1985: Manchester United won 2–1 against Chelsea, and Liverpool beat Luton Town 3–2 at Anfield. Sheffield Wednesday won 1–0 against West Bromwich Albion. Everton drew 1–1 with Manchester City at Maine Road. Tottenham lost 3–1 to Leicester City. Portsmouth won 4–0 against Millwall. Sheffield United won 4–1 against Bradford City. Oldham Athletic climbed up three places to second after winning 4–0 at home against Brighton. Norwich won 2–0 against Sunderland.
- 2 November 1985: Manchester United beat Coventry City 2–0 at Old Trafford, and Liverpool beat Leicester City 1–0 at Anfield. Everton lost 2–1 to West Ham. Charlton Athletic won 4–1 against Shrewsbury Town. Grimsby Town beat Millwall 5–1 at Blundell Park. Sheffield United beat Hull City 3–1 at Bramall Lane.
- 3 November 1985: West Bromwich Albion lost 2–1 to Nottingham Forest at the City Ground.
- 9 November 1985: Manchester United lost 1–0 to Sheffield Wednesday at Hillsborough. Liverpool won 3–0 against Coventry City. Lineker scored his second league hat-trick of the season as Everton beat Arsenal 6–1 at Goodison Park. West Ham won 2–1 against Oxford. Chelsea won 4–2 against Nottingham Forest. Tottenham lost 3–1 to Luton Town, and Sheffield United won 5–1 against Oldham Athletic at Boundary Park. Hull City won 5–0 against Fulham at Boothferry Park. Carlisle United won 3–0 against Stoke City.
- 13 November 1985: England completed their successful World Cup qualifying campaign by drawing with Northern Ireland at Wembley.
- 16 November 1985: Liverpool won 4–1 against West Bromwich Albion, while Manchester United drew with Tottenham. Everton beat Ipswich Town 4-3 at Portman Road. Manchester City won 2–0 against Nottingham Forest at the City Ground. In the Second Division, Brighton won 4–3 against Huddersfield, Middlesbrough won 3–2 against Oldham at Ayresome Park, and Sheffield United and Blackburn Rovers drew 3–3 at Bramall Lane.
- 23 November 1985: Manchester United lost 3–0 to Leicester City at Filbert Street. Liverpool won 2–0 against Birmingham City. Ipswich Town lost to Oxford United 4–3 after leading 3-0. Oldham lost 4–2 to Stoke.
- 26 November 1985: Ipswich Town beat Fourth Division pace-setters Swindon Town 6–1 at Portman Road in the Milk Cup, Chelsea drew 2–2 with Everton at Stamford Bridge and Liverpool beat Manchester United 2–1 at Anfield. Portsmouth had a replay against Tottenham after a goalless draw at Fratton Park, Arsenal beat Southampton 3–1, and Aston Villa won 2–1 against West Bromwich Albion.
- 29 November 1985: Manchester United signed Aston Villa midfielder Colin Gibson for £275,000.
- 30 November 1985: West Ham beat West Bromwich Albion 4-0, Ipswich Town won 2–1 against Sheffield Wednesday, and Everton beat Southampton 3–2 at the Dell.
- 1 December 1985: Nottingham Forest drew with Oxford United at the City Ground in the First Division.
- 7 December 1985: Manchester United beat Ipswich Town at Old Trafford, while Kenny Dalglish's Liverpool beat Aston Villa 3–0 at Anfield. Everton won 3–0 against West Bromwich Albion.
- 14 December 1985: Manchester United won 3–1 against Aston Villa. Liverpool lost 2–0 against Arsenal, for whom 19-year-old Irish striker Niall Quinn scored on his debut. West Ham United won 2–0 over Birmingham City. Everton lost 2–1 to Leicester City at Goodison Park. West Bromwich Albion drew 2–2 with Oxford at the Manor Ground. In the Second Division, Norwich City won 3–1 against Oldham.
- 19 December 1985 – The Football League confirms that the First Division will decrease to 21 clubs for the 1987–88 season, while the Second Division will expand to 23 clubs, and that in 1988–89 the First Division will have 20 clubs and the Second Division will have 23 clubs in 1987-88 and 24 clubs in 1988-89.
- 20 December 1985: The league accepted a £1.3 million offer to show nine First Division and League Cup games this season. The first match shown was the FA Cup third-round match between Charlton Athletic and West Ham on 5 January.
- 21 December 1985: Arsenal defeated Manchester United 1–0 at Old Trafford in the First Division, while Liverpool and Newcastle United drew 1–1. West Ham drew 0–0 with Luton Town. Chelsea won 2–1 against Birmingham City. Norwich City won against Millwall 6–1 at Carrow Road. Wimbledon, who were only elected to the Football League in 1977 and were still in the Fourth Division three seasons ago, won 5–0 against Sheffield United. Middlesbrough beat Fulham 3–0 at Craven Cottage.
- 22 December 1985: West Bromwich Albion won 3–1 against Watford. In the Second Division, Portsmouth won 1–0 against Carlisle United, and Derby and Blackpool won their matches in the Third Division. In the Fourth Division, Halifax scored three goals within 37 minutes against Scunthorpe United, and Iron forward John Hawley accomplished a hat-trick and won his team a point.
- 26 December 1985: In the First Division, Everton beat Manchester United 3–1 at Goodison Park. Liverpool lost 1–0 to Manchester City at Maine Road, and West Ham lost 1–0 to Tottenham.
- 28 December 1985: Everton won 3–1 against Sheffield Wednesday. Aston Villa and West Bromwich Albion drew 1–1 at Villa Park. Chelsea won 2–0 against Tottenham. Liverpool drew 1–1 with Nottingham Forest at the City Ground. Millwall won 5–0 against Hull City. Brighton won 3–2 against Leeds at Elland Road. Portsmouth won 4–0 against Shrewsbury Town.
- 1 January 1986: Manchester United beat Birmingham City 1–0 at Old Trafford. Everton drew 2–2 with Newcastle United on Tyneside. Liverpool drew 2–2 with Sheffield Wednesday. Nottingham Forest beat Coventry City 5–2 at the City Ground. Hull City won 4–1 against Barnsley at Oakwell. Norwich City and Portsmouth won their matches. Brighton won 2–0 against Crystal Palace.
- 2 January 1986: Middlesbrough were reported to be £1 million in debt. Peterborough United fan Barry Fox, 22, was jailed for three years for punching a policeman unconscious in the game against Northampton Town at London Road on 12 October.
- 4 January 1986: In the FA Cup's third round, Leicester City lost 3–1 to Third Division Bristol Rovers. Liverpool won 5–0 against Norwich City. Arsenal beat Grimsby Town 4–3 at Blundell Park. Ipswich Town and Bradford drew 4–4 at Portman Road.
- 5 January 1986: West Ham won 1–0 against Charlton Athletic at Selhurst Park. Everton won 1–0 against Exeter City. The FA Cup ties were the first televised domestic matches of the season.
- 9 January 1986: Manchester United won 2–0 against Rochdale.
- 11 January 1986: Manchester United beat Oxford United 3–1 at the Manor Ground. Everton won 4–3 against Queens Park Rangers. Chelsea won 1–0 over Luton Town. Ipswich Town won 1–0 against Birmingham City. West Bromwich Albion drew 1–1 with Newcastle United. Norwich City won 2–0 against Middlesbrough. Sunderland won 4–2 against Leeds United.
- 12 January 1986: Liverpool won 3–2 win against Watford at Vicarage Road.
- 14 January 1986: Birmingham City were knocked out of the FA Cup after losing 2–1 to Altrincham.
- 16 January 1986: Ron Saunders resigned as manager of Birmingham City.
- 18 January 1986: Manchester United lost 3–2 to Nottingham Forest. Lineker scored twice for Everton in their 2–0 win over Birmingham City.
- 22 January 1986: Former Manchester City manager John Bond was appointed as the new manager of Birmingham City.
- 25 January 1986: In the FA Cup's fourth round, Arsenal won 5–1 at home against Rotherham United, Sheffield Wednesday won 5–0 over Orient, and Manchester United drew 0–0 with Sunderland at Roker Park, in which captain Bryan Robson was substituted due to a shoulder injury.
- 26 January 1986: Liverpool won 2–1 against Chelsea in the FA Cup fourth round.
- 29 January 1986: Manchester United signed striker Terry Gibson from Coventry City for £600,000. In the FA Cup fourth round replays, Tottenham beat Notts County 5–0, Manchester United beat Sunderland 3–0, and Millwall beat Aston Villa 1–0.
- 1 February 1986: Everton won 1–0 at home against Tottenham. Liverpool lost 2–1 to Ipswich. Stiles resigned after four months as West Bromwich Albion's manager.
- 2 February 1986: Manchester United lost 2–1 to West Ham.
- 4 February 1986: Everton signed striker Warren Aspinall from Wigan Athletic for £150,000.
- 8 February 1986: Chelsea lost 4–1 to Oxford United.
- 9 February 1986: Everton remained at the top of the First Division on goal difference after Liverpool and Manchester United drew 1–1 at Anfield.
- 11 February 1986: Everton won 4–0 at home against Manchester City.
- 12 February 1986: The League Cup semi-finals were played. Aston Villa drew 2–2 with Oxford United, and Liverpool lost 1–0 to Queens Park Rangers.
- 14 February 1986: One month after leaving Birmingham City, Ron Saunders was named as the new manager of West Bromwich Albion.
- 15 February 1986: Liverpool drew 1–1 with York City at Bootham Crescent in the fifth round of the FA Cup.
- 16 February 1986: Coventry City and Birmingham City drew 4-4 at Highfield Road.
- 18 February 1986: York City lost the fifth round replay 3–1 to Liverpool at Anfield.
- 22 February 1986: Manchester United won 3–0 against West Bromwich Albion as Jesper Olsen scored a hat-trick.
- 1 March 1986: Everton beat Aston Villa 2–0 at home. Manchester United lost 1–0 to Southampton.
- 2 March 1986: Liverpool beat Tottenham 2–1 at White Hart Lane in the league.
- 4 March 1986: Everton won 2–1 against Tottenham in the fifth round of the FA Cup.
- 5 March 1986: In the FA Cup fifth round, Watford drew 1–1 with Bury at Vicarage Road, while Manchester United drew 1–1 with West Ham at Upton Park. Southampton won 1–0 against Millwall in a replay, while Sheffield Wednesday beat Derby County at Hillsborough, and Luton Town beat Arsenal 3–0 in a second replay. Liverpool drew 2–2 with Queens Park Rangers at Anfield.
- 8 March 1986: Watford beat Bury 3–0 at Gigg Lane. In the first two quarter-final ties, Everton drew 2–2 with Luton Town and forced a replay, while Southampton won 2–0 against Brighton. Aston Villa remained in the relegation zone after losing 4–1 to Arsenal, Chelsea won 1–0 against Manchester City, Ipswich Town won 1–0 at home against Nottingham Forest, Liverpool beat Queen Park Rangers 4–1 at Anfield, and West Bromwich Albion lost 5–0 to Tottenham.
- 9 March 1986: Manchester United lost 2–0 to West Ham in the FA Cup fifth round replays.
- 11 March 1986: Liverpool drew with Watford 0–0 in the FA Cup quarter-final. Arsenal won 2–1 against Ipswich Town. Southampton beat Queens Park Rangers 2–0 at Loftus Road.
- 12 March 1986: Oxford United reached the League Cup final for the first time after beating Aston Villa 4–3 on aggregate. Manchester United signed striker Peter Davenport from Nottingham Forest for £750,000. The England U21 team defeated Denmark 1–0 in the European Championship quarter-final in Copenhagen, with the only goal of the game coming from Coventry City midfielder Nick Pickering. In the FA Cup, West Ham lost 2–1 to Sheffield Wednesday at Hillsborough. Everton beat Luton Town 1–0 in the quarter-final replay at Goodison Park. Birmingham City lost 4–2 to Leicester City at Filbert Street. Norwich City won 4–1 against Huddersfield Town.
- 14 March 1986: Portsmouth signed Oldham Athletic striker Micky Quinn, who had scored 34 goals since he joined the Latics in January 1984, for £150,000.
- 15 March 1986: Liverpool won against Southampton 2–1 at the Dell. Norwich beat Carlisle United 2–1 at Carrow Road.
- 16 March 1986: Everton drew 1–1 with Chelsea.
- 17 March 1986: Liverpool won their FA Cup quarter-final replay against Watford 2–1 at Vicarage Road.
- 21 March 1986: Manchester United announced striker Mark Hughes was to join Barcelona, managed by former Queens Park Rangers and Crystal Palace boss Terry Venables, for a fee of £2 million at the end of the season.
- 22 March 1986: Don Howe resigns as Arsenal's manager after reports that Venables was offered his job. His final game in charge was Arsenal's 3–0 victory over Coventry. Coach Steve Burtenshaw remained in temporary charge at Highbury. Manchester United drew 2–2 in the Manchester derby. Liverpool beat Oxford United 6–0 at Anfield. Birmingham City won 3–0 against Aston Villa. Norwich City won 5–2 against Sheffield United.
- 23 March 1986: The first final of the Full Members Cup was played at Wembley Stadium, with Chelsea defeating Manchester City 5–4 with a hat-trick from David Speedie and two goals from Colin Lee.
- 25 March 1986: Steve Perryman, 34, left Tottenham after 17 years and signed for Oxford United on a free transfer.
- 26 March 1986: In the return leg of the under-21 European Championship quarter-final, England drew 1–1 with Denmark at Maine Road. Everton goalkeeper Neville Southall was ruled out after an ankle injury suffered on international duty for Wales.
- 27 March 1986: On transfer deadline day, Wimbledon paid £125,000 for Millwall striker John Fashanu. After Southall's injury, Everton signed veteran goalkeeper Pat Jennings on a short-term contract.
- 29 March 1986: Everton maintained their lead of the First Division with a 1–0 win over Newcastle United. Liverpool drew 0–0 with Sheffield Wednesday at Hillsborough. Manchester United drew 1–1 with Birmingham, while West Ham won against Chelsea 4–0 at Stamford Bridge. West Bromwich Albion won 1–0 against Southampton at The Hawthorns.
- 31 March 1986: Liverpool won 2–0 against Manchester City, and Everton drew 0–0 with Manchester United at Old Trafford. Chelsea lost 6–0 to Queens Park Rangers at Loftus Road. West Ham beat Tottenham 2–1 at Upton Park.
- 1 April 1986: West Bromwich Albion lost 3–0 to Luton Town. Arsenal lost 3–0 to Watford.
- 5 April 1986: Liverpool beat Southampton 2–0 in the FA Cup semi-final at White Hart Lane. Everton won 2–1 against Sheffield Wednesday in the other semi-final at Villa Park. Manchester United won 3–1 against Coventry City. Arsenal won 1–0 against Manchester City, while Chelsea drew 1–1 with Ipswich Town. Fulham lost 4–2 away to Sunderland. Norwich won 3–0 home against Brighton.
- 6 April 1986: Birmingham City lost 2–0 to Luton Town.
- 8 April 1986: West Ham won 1–0 home against Southampton.
- 9 April 1986: England's under-21 team lost 2–0 to Italy in Pisa in the semi-final first leg. Manchester United lost 2–1 to Chelsea. Aston Villa drew 2–2 with Newcastle United on Tyneside after Oxford won against Watford. Birmingham City lost 4–1 to Newcastle. Liverpool won 5–0 against Coventry City, while Everton won 1–0 against Arsenal. West Ham beat Oxford United 3–1 at Upton Park, and Aston Villa won 4–1 against Watford. Chelsea drew 0–0 with Nottingham Forest. Norwich City won 2–0 against Bradford City. Wimbldeon won 3–0 against Sunderland at Plough Lane.
- 12 April 1986: West Bromwich Albion were relegated from the First Division after losing 1–0 to Queens Park Rangers.
- 13 April 1986: Manchester United lost 2–0 to Sheffield Wednesday.
- 14 April 1986: Tottenham agreed a £50,000 fee with Millwall for 18-year-old defender Neil Ruddock. Queens Park Rangers beat Leicester City 4–1 in the First Division at Filbert Street.
- 15 April 1986: Everton won 2–0 win against Watford. Chelsea won 2–1 against West Ham.
- 16 April 1986: Liverpool beat Luton Town 1–0 at Kenilworth Road, and Aston Villa beat Ipswich Town 1–0. Manchester United won 4–2 against Newcastle United. Birmingham City lost 2–0 to Tottenham.
- 19 April 1986: Birmingham City lost 2–0 at home to Southampton and were relegated from the First Division. Manchester United tied 0–0 with Tottenham at White Hart Lane. Everton beat Ipswich Town 1–0, and Liverpool won 2–1 against West Bromwich Albion at the Hawthorns. Norwich City drew 1–1 with Stoke City.
- 20 April 1986: Oxford United beat Queens Park Rangers 3–0 in the Milk Cup final at Wembley.
- 21 April 1986: West Ham United beat Newcastle United 8–1 in the league at Upton Park, with defender Alvin Martin scoring a hat-trick.
- 23 April 1986: England's under-21 drew 1–1 with Italy at the County Ground in Swindon, with Arsenal midfielder Stewart Robson scoring their only goal.
- 26 April 1986: Wolverhampton Wanderers became the third West Midlands club to be relegated, and the second English league club to be relegated three consecutive times, after their descent into the Fourth Division is confirmed. Liverpool defender Gary Gillespie scores a hat-trick in a 5–0 league win over Birmingham City at Anfield, while Everton drew 0–0 with Nottingham Forest. West Ham won 1–0 at home against Coventry City, while Manchester United beat Leicester City 4–0 at Old Trafford. Chelsea lost 3–1 to Aston Villa. Ipswich Town climbed three places above the relegation zone with a 3–2 win over Oxford United. Fulham were relegated from the Second Division despite a 2–1 home win against Huddersfield Town, while Middlesbrough beat Millwall 3–0 to climb out of the bottom three, while Sunderland lost 3–1 to Brighton.
- 28 April 1986: Ray Stewart converted a penalty, which gave West Ham a 1–0 win against Manchester City.
- 29 April 1986: Charlton Athletic won 2–0 against Fulham. Carlisle won 2–0 against Brighton at Brunton Park. Sunderland won 2–0 against Shrewsbury Town.
- 30 April 1986: Everton lost 1–0 to Oxford, Liverpool won 2–0 against Leicester, and West Ham won 2–1 against Ipswich Town.
- 1 May 1986: Chelsea agreed a £400,000 fee for Hibernian striker Gordon Durie.
- 3 May 1986: Player-manager Kenny Dalglish scored the only goal as Liverpool beat Chelsea at Stamford Bridge to win the First Division title. Everton won against Southampton 6–1. Ipswich Town lost their last match 1–0 to Sheffield Wednesday. Coventry City and Leicester City secured survival with home wins. Charlton Athletic sealed their promotion from the Second Division with a 3–2 win against relegation-threatened Carlisle United. Wimbledon reached the First Division by winning 1–0 against Huddersfield.
- 5 May 1986: The First Division ended with four matches and 21 goals. Oxford United beat Arsenal 3–0, Chelsea finished sixth after losing 5–1 to Watford, Everton finished in second place after winning 3–1 against West Ham at Goodison Park, and Tottenham won 5–3 against Southampton. The Second Division ended with Blackburn winning 3–1 against Grimsby Town at Ewood Park, while Carlisle lost 2–1 to Oldham at Boundary Park. Reading won the Third Division after a 2–0 win over Doncaster Rovers, and were promoted to the Second Division. Lincoln City was relegated after they lost 3–2 to Wolves. Fourth Division champions Swindon Town finished the season with a Football League record of 102 points.
- 6 May 1986: Everton manager Howard Kendall dismissed speculation that Lineker would sign for Barcelona.
- 7 May 1986: After the Fourth Division ended, Rochdale drew 1–1 with Peterborough United at London Road and finished 18th to avoid having to apply for re-election to the Football League.
- 9 May 1986: Derby County were promoted from the Third Division after a 2–1 win over Rotherham United at the Baseball Ground.
- 10 May 1986: Ian Rush scored twice for Liverpool, beating Everton 3–1 in the first-ever all-Merseyside FA Cup final. Liverpool became the fifth club in history to win the league championship and FA Cup double.
- 13 May 1986: Tottenham sacked manager Peter Shreeves after two seasons in charge; he had turned Tottenham into title contenders and guided them to third place in his first season as manager, but during the second season they finished 10th in the First Division.
- 14 May 1986: Millwall manager George Graham returned to Highbury as the club's new manager. Aberdeen manager Alex Ferguson rejected the position.
- 16 May 1986: David Pleat stepped down as Luton Town's manager to become the new Tottenham manager.
- 22 May 1986: 20-year-old defender Denis Irwin joined Oldham Athletic on a free transfer from Leeds United.
- 3 June 1986: England lost 1–0 to Portugal in their opening World Cup game. Luton Town coach John Moore was named as the club's new manager.
- 5 June 1986: Coventry City signed winger David Phillips from Manchester City for £150,000.
- 6 June 1986: Morocco drew 0-0 with England.
- 8 June 1986: Ian Rush agreed to sign for Juventus for £3 million, but loaned back to Liverpool for the 1986–87 season.
- 11 June 1986: Lineker scored a hat-trick in England's 3–0 victory over Poland, which allowed them to advance to the second round of the World Cup.
- 13 June 1986: Southampton signed 19-year-old goalkeeper Tim Flowers from Wolverhampton Wanderers for £70,000, while 23-year-old midfielder Ian Crook joined Norwich City from Tottenham for £80,000.
- 18 June 1986: England beat Paraguay 3–0 and reached the World Cup quarter-finals for the first time since 1970.
- 22 June 1986: England lost 2–1 to Argentina.

== FA Cup ==
Liverpool beat Everton 3–1 in the final – with Rush scoring twice – to complete the third league championship and FA Cup double of the 20th century.

== League Cup ==
After being promoted to the First Division the season before, Oxford United won the League Cup, beating the Queens Park Rangers 3–0 in the final.

== Football League ==
=== First Division ===
Liverpool narrowly reclaimed the league title from Everton. They completed their first and only league and cup double by defeating Everton in the FA Cup final.

As a result of the previous year's Heysel Stadium disaster, both Liverpool and Everton missed out on the European Cup and European Cup Winners' Cup respectively, while West Ham United, Manchester United and Sheffield Wednesday all missed out on the UEFA Cup, as did Oxford United.

West Bromwich Albion fell back into Division Two after ten seasons, following a campaign in which they only won four games. Birmingham City performed almost as poorly and made an immediate return to Division Two. Coventry City had spent most of the season in the relegation zone until a late revival after George Curtis and John Sillett took over as co-managers with three games remaining.

Pos	Team	Pld	W	D	L	GF	GA	GD	Pts	Qualification or relegation
1	Liverpool (C)	42	26	10	6	89	37	+52	88	Disqualified from the European Cup
2	Everton (Note: Since the FA Cup winners, Liverpool, would have instead qualified for the European Cup, qualification would have instead been passed down to runners-up Everton.)	42	26	8	8	87	41	+46	86	Disqualified from the European Cup Winners' Cup
3	West Ham United	42	26	6	10	74	40	+34	84	Disqualified from the UEFA Cup
4	Manchester United	42	22	10	10	70	36	+34	76	Disqualified from the UEFA Cup
5	Sheffield Wednesday (Note: Since Everton would have instead qualified for the European Cup Winners' Cup, UEFA Cup qualification would have been passed down to Sheffield Wednesday.)	42	21	10	11	63	54	+9	73	Disqualified from the UEFA Cup
6	Chelsea	42	20	11	11	57	56	+1	71	
7	Arsenal	42	20	9	13	49	47	+2	69	
8	Nottingham Forest	42	19	11	12	69	53	+16	68	
9	Luton Town	42	18	12	12	61	44	+17	66	
10	Tottenham Hotspur	42	19	8	15	74	52	+22	65	
11	Newcastle United	42	17	12	13	67	72	−5	63	
12	Watford	42	16	11	15	69	62	+7	59	
13	Queens Park Rangers	42	15	7	20	53	64	−11	52	
14	Southampton	42	12	10	20	51	62	−11	46	
15	Manchester City	42	11	12	19	43	57	−14	45	
16	Aston Villa	42	10	14	18	51	67	−16	44	
17	Coventry City	42	11	10	21	48	71	−23	43	
18	Oxford United (Note: Oxford United would have qualified as League Cup winners.)	42	10	12	20	62	80	−18	42	Disqualified from the UEFA Cup
19	Leicester City	42	10	12	20	54	76	−22	42	
20	Ipswich Town (R)	42	11	8	23	32	55	−23	41	Relegation to the Second Division
21	Birmingham City (R)	42	8	5	29	30	73	−43	29	Relegation to the Second Division
22	West Bromwich Albion (R)	42	4	12	26	35	89	−54	24	Relegation to the Second Division

Source: World Football
Rules for classification: 1) Points; 2) Goal difference; 3) Goals scored
(C) Champions; (R) Relegated

=== Second Division ===
Norwich City won the Second Division title and were promoted back to the First Division after one season. Charlton Athletic, despite having suffered a financial crisis over the previous years and leaving their home ground The Valley to ground share with Crystal Palace at Selhurst Park, returned to the First Division for the first time since 1957. Wimbledon, who had been in the Fourth Division only three years before and were in only their second season in the Second Division, claimed the third and final promotion spot.

Fulham were relegated in last place after mounting financial pressures had forced them to sell off most of their squad during the summer. Middlesbrough suffered their only second relegation to the Third Division, as their own financial situation worsened to the point where they were locked out of their Ayresome Park ground and nearly expelled from the Football League before the following season.

Pos	Team	Pld	W	D	L	GF	GA	GD	Pts	Qualification or relegation
1	Norwich City (C, P)	42	25	9	8	84	37	+47	84	Promotion to the First Division
2	Charlton Athletic (P)	42	22	11	9	78	45	+33	77	Promotion to the First Division
3	Wimbledon (P)	42	21	13	8	58	37	+21	76	Promotion to the First Division
4	Portsmouth	42	22	7	13	69	41	+28	73	
5	Crystal Palace	42	19	9	14	57	52	+5	66	
6	Hull City	42	17	13	12	65	55	+10	64	
7	Sheffield United	42	17	11	14	64	63	+1	62	
8	Oldham Athletic	42	17	9	16	62	61	+1	60	
9	Millwall	42	17	8	17	64	65	−1	59	
10	Stoke City	42	14	15	13	48	50	−2	57	
11	Brighton & Hove Albion	42	16	8	18	64	64	0	56	
12	Barnsley	42	14	14	14	47	50	−3	56	
13	Bradford City	42	16	6	20	51	63	−12	54	
14	Leeds United	42	15	8	19	56	72	−16	53	
15	Grimsby Town	42	14	10	18	58	62	−4	52	
16	Huddersfield Town	42	14	10	18	51	67	−16	52	
17	Shrewsbury Town	42	14	9	19	52	64	−12	51	
18	Sunderland	42	13	11	18	47	61	−14	50	
19	Blackburn Rovers	42	12	13	17	53	62	−9	49	
20	Carlisle United (R)	42	13	7	22	47	71	−24	46	Relegation to the Third Division
21	Middlesbrough (R)	42	12	9	21	44	53	−9	45	Relegation to the Third Division
22	Fulham (R)	42	10	6	26	45	69	−24	36	Relegation to the Third Division

Rules for classification: 1) Points; 2) Goal difference; 3) Goals scored
(C) Champions; (P) Promoted; (R) Relegated

=== Third Division ===
Reading won the Third Division title after beginning the season with 13 successive victories, meaning they would be playing in the Second Division for the first time since 1931. Plymouth Argyle took the runner-up spot, and Derby County was the third promoted side.

The bottom two positions were occupied by Swansea City and the Wolverhampton Wanderers. Cardiff City and Lincoln City filled the other relegation spots.

Pos	Team	Pld	W	D	L	GF	GA	GD	Pts	Promotion or relegation
1	Reading (C, P)	46	29	7	10	67	51	+16	94	Promotion to the Second Division
2	Plymouth Argyle (P)	46	26	9	11	88	53	+35	87	Promotion to the Second Division
3	Derby County (P)	46	23	15	8	80	41	+39	84	Promotion to the Second Division
4	Wigan Athletic	46	23	14	9	82	48	+34	83	
5	Gillingham	46	22	13	11	81	54	+27	79	
6	Walsall	46	22	9	15	90	64	+26	75	
7	York City	46	20	11	15	77	58	+19	71	
8	Notts County	46	19	14	13	71	60	+11	71	
9	Bristol City	46	18	14	14	69	60	+9	68	
10	Brentford	46	18	12	16	58	61	−3	66	
11	Doncaster Rovers	46	16	16	14	45	52	−7	64	
12	Blackpool	46	17	12	17	66	55	+11	63	
13	Darlington	46	15	13	18	61	78	−17	58	
14	Rotherham United	46	15	12	19	61	59	+2	57	
15	Bournemouth	46	15	9	22	65	72	−7	54	
16	Bristol Rovers	46	14	12	20	51	75	−24	54	
17	Chesterfield	46	13	14	19	61	64	−3	53	
18	Bolton Wanderers	46	15	8	23	54	68	−14	53	
19	Newport County	46	11	18	17	52	65	−13	51	
20	Bury	46	12	13	21	63	67	−4	49	
21	Lincoln City (R)	46	10	16	20	55	77	−22	46	Relegation to the Fourth Division
22	Cardiff City (R)	46	12	9	25	53	83	−30	45	Relegation to the Fourth Division
23	Wolverhampton Wanderers (R)	46	11	10	25	57	98	−41	43	Relegation to the Fourth Division
24	Swansea City (R)	46	11	10	25	43	87	−44	43	Relegation to the Fourth Division

(C) Champions; (P) Promoted; (R) Relegated

=== Fourth Division ===
Swindon Town won promotion by a record-breaking 18 points, and became the second team (after York City two years previously) to exceed 100 points in a season, and was also awarded the board's decision to reinstate manager Lou Macari days after his controversial dismissal at the end of the previous season. Chester City, who had finished bottom of the league just two years prior, were promoted as runners-up. Mansfield Town and Port Vale took the two remaining promotion spaces.

Torquay United, Preston North End, Cambridge United, and Exeter City were made to apply for re-election. Preston, the inaugural Football League champions back in 1888–89, saw their lowest finish ever at 23rd position almost a century on from their two back-to-back titles.

Pos	Team	Pld	W	D	L	GF	GA	GD	Pts	Promotion or relegation
1	Swindon Town (C, P)	46	32	6	8	82	43	+39	102	Promotion to the Third Division
2	Chester City (P)	46	23	15	8	83	50	+33	84	Promotion to the Third Division
3	Mansfield Town (P)	46	23	12	11	74	47	+27	81	Promotion to the Third Division
4	Port Vale (P)	46	21	16	9	67	37	+30	79	Promotion to the Third Division
5	Orient	46	20	12	14	79	64	+15	72	
6	Colchester United	46	19	13	14	88	63	+25	70	
7	Hartlepool United	46	20	10	16	68	67	+1	70	
8	Northampton Town	46	18	10	18	79	58	+21	64	
9	Southend United	46	18	10	18	69	67	+2	64	
10	Hereford United	46	18	10	18	74	73	+1	64	
11	Stockport County	46	17	13	16	63	71	−8	64	
12	Crewe Alexandra	46	18	9	19	54	61	−7	63	
13	Wrexham	46	17	9	20	68	80	−12	60	Qualification for the European Cup Winners' Cup first round
14	Burnley	46	16	11	19	60	65	−5	59	
15	Scunthorpe United	46	15	14	17	50	55	−5	59	
16	Aldershot	46	17	7	22	66	74	−8	58	
17	Peterborough United	46	13	17	16	52	64	−12	56	
18	Rochdale	46	14	13	19	57	77	−20	55	
19	Tranmere Rovers	46	15	9	22	74	73	+1	54	
20	Halifax Town	46	14	12	20	60	71	−11	54	
21	Exeter City	46	13	15	18	47	59	−12	54	Re-elected
22	Cambridge United	46	15	9	22	65	80	−15	54	Re-elected
23	Preston North End	46	11	10	25	54	89	−35	43	Re-elected
24	Torquay United	46	9	10	27	43	88	−45	37	Re-elected

(C) Champions; (P) Promoted

=== Top goalscorers ===
First Division

- Gary Lineker (Everton) – 30 goals

Second Division

- Kevin Drinkell (Norwich City) – 22 goals

Third Division

- Trevor Senior (Reading) – 27 goals

Fourth Division

- Richard Cadette (Southend United) – 25 goals

== Famous debutants ==
- 24 August 1985: Julian Dicks, 17-year-old left-back, made his debut as a substitute for Birmingham City in a 2–0 defeat by Chelsea at Stamford Bridge.
- 31 August 1985: Ian Wright, 21-year-old striker, made his debut for Crystal Palace in a 3–2 defeat by Huddersfield Town at Selhurst Park in the Second Division soon after joining the club from non-league Greenwich Borough.
- 14 September 1985: Carlton Palmer, 19-year-old midfielder, made his debut as a substitute for West Bromwich Albion in a 4–1 defeat by Newcastle United at St James' Park.
- 28 September 1985: David Rocastle, 18-year-old midfielder, made his debut for Arsenal in a 1–1 draw with Newcastle United in the First Division at Highbury.
- 23 November 1985: Martin Keown, 19-year-old defender, made his debut for Arsenal in a goalless draw with West Bromwich Albion at The Hawthorns.
- 14 December 1985: Niall Quinn, 19-year-old centre-forward, made his debut and scored for Arsenal in a 2–0 win over Liverpool at Highbury.
- 15 March 1986: Dalian Atkinson, 17-year-old striker, made his debut as a substitute for Ipswich Town in a 3–1 defeat by Newcastle United at St James' Park.
- 3 May 1986: Earl Barrett, 19-year-old defender, made his debut as for Manchester City in a 1–1 draw with Luton Town at Maine Road.
