= 1985–86 Football League =

87th season of the Football League

The Football League
- Season: 1985–86
- Champions: Liverpool

The 1985–86 season was the 87th completed season of The Football League.

== Final league tables and results ==
The tables and results below are reproduced here in the exact form that they can be found at The Rec.Sport.Soccer Statistics Foundation website, with home and away statistics separated.

During the first five seasons of the league, that is, until the season 1893–94, re-election process concerned the clubs which finished in the bottom four of the league. From the 1894–95 season and until the 1920–21 season the re-election process was required of the clubs which finished in the bottom three of the league. From the 1922–23 season on it was required of the bottom two teams of both Third Division North and Third Division South. Since the Fourth Division was established in the 1958–59 season, the re-election process has concerned the bottom four clubs in that division.

== First Division ==
First Division
- Season: 1985–86
- Champions: Liverpool; 16th English title
- Relegated: Ipswich Town; Birmingham City; West Bromwich Albion
- Matches: 462
- Goals: 1,288 (2.79 per match)
- Top goalscorer: Gary Lineker (30 goals)
- Biggest home win: Luton Town 7–0 Southampton (19 October 1985); West Ham United 8–1 Newcastle United (21 April 1986)
- Biggest away win: Sheffield Wednesday 1–5 Everton (3 September 1985); West Bromwich Albion 1–5 Manchester United (21 September 1985); Chelsea 0–4 West Ham United (29 Mar 1986); Chelsea 1–5 Watford (5 May 1986)
- Highest scoring: West Ham United 8–1 Newcastle United (21 April 1986)
- Longest winning run: 10 matches Manchester United
- Longest unbeaten run: 18 matches West Ham United
- Longest losing run: 9 matches West Bromwich Albion

In a close three-horse race, Liverpool pipped Everton and West Ham United to the First Division title, while also defeating Merseyside rivals Everton in the FA Cup Final, thereby completing a historic double. Manchester United had been ten points clear in early November after winning their first ten matches; and thirteen of their first fifteen, but injuries, loss of form and ineffective signings had seen them fall away, leaving them still waiting for their first league title since 1967, mounting the pressure of manager Ron Atkinson, although the Old Trafford board initially decided to stick with Atkinson as their manager for the following season.

Arsenal finished seventh in the league for a third successive season, their manager Don Howe resigning a few weeks before the end of the season after it was reported that Terry Venables had been offered his job. Coach Steve Burtenshaw was placed in temporary charge of the first team until the end of the season, when George Graham returned to Highbury as manager. Tottenham Hotspur finished a disappointing 10th in the league, prompting the White Hart Lane board to sack manager Peter Shreeves and replace him with Luton Town's David Pleat.

At the lower end of the table, a disastrous season saw West Bromwich Albion relegated in bottom place after just four wins in the league, while nearby rivals Birmingham City fared nearly as badly, and were relegated in second place from bottom; both clubs would not return to the top flight until 2002. Their local rivals Aston Villa nearly went down with them, before a late upturn in form secured their survival. Oxford United had a memorable first season at this level as League Cup winners, but spent much of the season battling against relegation before finally managing to beat the drop. The final relegation place went to Ipswich Town, who had gradually fallen out of contention with the First Division's leading pack since Bobby Robson's departure to manage the England team four years earlier.

=== Final table ===
Pos	Team	Pld	W	D	L	GF	GA	GD	Pts	Qualification or relegation
1	Liverpool (C)	42	26	10	6	89	37	+52	88	Disqualified from the European Cup
2	Everton (Note: Since the FA Cup winners, Liverpool, would have instead qualified for the European Cup, qualification would have instead been passed down to runners-up Everton.)	42	26	8	8	87	41	+46	86	Disqualified from the European Cup Winners' Cup
3	West Ham United	42	26	6	10	74	40	+34	84	Disqualified from the UEFA Cup
4	Manchester United	42	22	10	10	70	36	+34	76	Disqualified from the UEFA Cup
5	Sheffield Wednesday (Note: Since Everton would have instead qualified for the European Cup Winners' Cup, UEFA Cup qualification would have been passed down to Sheffield Wednesday.)	42	21	10	11	63	54	+9	73	Disqualified from the UEFA Cup
6	Chelsea	42	20	11	11	57	56	+1	71	
7	Arsenal	42	20	9	13	49	47	+2	69	
8	Nottingham Forest	42	19	11	12	69	53	+16	68	
9	Luton Town	42	18	12	12	61	44	+17	66	
10	Tottenham Hotspur	42	19	8	15	74	52	+22	65	
11	Newcastle United	42	17	12	13	67	72	−5	63	
12	Watford	42	16	11	15	69	62	+7	59	
13	Queens Park Rangers	42	15	7	20	53	64	−11	52	
14	Southampton	42	12	10	20	51	62	−11	46	
15	Manchester City	42	11	12	19	43	57	−14	45	
16	Aston Villa	42	10	14	18	51	67	−16	44	
17	Coventry City	42	11	10	21	48	71	−23	43	
18	Oxford United (Note: Oxford United would have qualified as League Cup winners.)	42	10	12	20	62	80	−18	42	Disqualified from the UEFA Cup
19	Leicester City	42	10	12	20	54	76	−22	42	
20	Ipswich Town (R)	42	11	8	23	32	55	−23	41	Relegation to the Second Division
21	Birmingham City (R)	42	8	5	29	30	73	−43	29	Relegation to the Second Division
22	West Bromwich Albion (R)	42	4	12	26	35	89	−54	24	Relegation to the Second Division

Source: World Football
Rules for classification: 1) Points; 2) Goal difference; 3) Goals scored
(C) Champions; (R) Relegated

=== First Division results ===
Home \ Away	ARS	AST	BIR	CHE	COV	EVE	IPS	LEI	LIV	LUT	MCI	MUN	NEW	NOT	OXF	QPR	SHW	SOU	TOT	WAT	WBA	WHU
Arsenal		3–2	0–0	2–0	3–0	0–1	1–0	1–0	2–0	2–1	1–0	1–2	0–0	1–1	2–1	3–1	1–0	3–2	0–0	0–2	2–2	1–0
Aston Villa	1–4		0–3	3–1	1–1	0–0	1–0	1–0	2–2	3–1	0–1	1–3	1–2	1–2	2–0	1–2	1–1	0–0	1–2	4–1	1–1	2–1
Birmingham City	0–1	0–0		1–2	0–1	0–2	0–1	2–1	0–2	0–2	1–0	1–1	0–1	0–1	3–1	2–0	0–2	0–2	1–2	1–2	0–1	1–0
Chelsea	2–1	2–1	2–0		1–0	2–1	1–1	2–2	0–1	1–0	1–0	1–2	1–1	4–2	1–4	1–1	2–1	2–0	2–0	1–5	3–0	0–4
Coventry City	0–2	3–3	4–4	1–1		1–3	0–1	3–0	0–3	1–0	1–1	1–3	1–2	0–0	5–2	2–1	0–1	3–2	2–3	0–2	3–0	0–1
Everton	6–1	2–0	4–1	1–1	1–1		1–0	1–2	2–3	2–0	4–0	3–1	1–0	1–1	2–0	4–3	3–1	6–1	1–0	4–1	2–0	3–1
Ipswich Town	1–2	0–3	0–1	0–2	1–0	3–4		0–2	2–1	1–1	0–0	0–1	2–2	1–0	3–2	1–0	2–1	1–1	1–0	0–0	1–0	0–1
Leicester City	2–2	3–1	4–2	0–0	2–1	3–1	1–0		0–2	0–0	1–1	3–0	2–0	0–3	4–4	1–4	2–3	2–2	1–4	2–2	2–2	0–1
Liverpool	2–0	3–0	5–0	1–1	5–0	0–2	5–0	1–0		3–2	2–0	1–1	1–1	2–0	6–0	4–1	2–2	1–0	4–1	3–1	4–1	3–1
Luton Town	2–2	2–0	2–0	1–1	0–1	2–1	1–0	3–1	0–1		2–1	1–1	2–0	1–1	1–2	2–0	1–0	7–0	1–1	3–2	3–0	0–0
Manchester City	0–1	2–2	1–1	0–1	5–1	1–1	1–1	1–1	1–0	1–1		0–3	1–0	1–2	0–3	2–0	1–3	1–0	2–1	0–1	2–1	2–2
Manchester United	0–1	4–0	1–0	1–2	2–0	0–0	1–0	4–0	1–1	2–0	2–2		3–0	2–3	3–0	2–0	0–2	1–0	0–0	1–1	3–0	2–0
Newcastle United	1–0	2–2	4–1	1–3	3–2	2–2	3–1	2–1	1–0	2–2	3–1	2–4		0–3	3–0	3–1	4–1	2–1	2–2	1–1	4–1	1–2
Nottingham Forest	3–2	1–1	3–0	0–0	5–2	0–0	3–1	4–3	1–1	2–0	0–2	1–3	1–2		1–1	4–0	0–1	2–1	0–1	3–2	2–1	2–1
Oxford United	3–0	1–1	0–1	2–1	0–1	1–0	4–3	5–0	2–2	1–1	1–0	1–3	1–2	1–2		3–3	0–1	3–0	1–1	1–1	2–2	1–2
Queens Park Rangers	0–1	0–1	3–1	6–0	0–2	3–0	1–0	2–0	2–1	1–1	0–0	1–0	3–1	2–1	3–1		1–1	0–2	2–5	2–1	1–0	0–1
Sheffield Wednesday	2–0	2–0	5–1	1–1	2–2	1–5	1–0	1–0	0–0	3–2	3–2	1–0	2–2	2–1	2–1	0–0		2–1	1–2	2–1	1–0	2–2
Southampton	3–0	0–0	1–0	0–1	1–1	2–3	1–0	0–0	1–2	1–2	3–0	1–0	1–1	3–1	1–1	3–0	2–3		1–0	3–1	3–1	1–1
Tottenham Hotspur	1–0	4–2	2–0	4–1	0–1	0–1	2–0	1–3	1–2	1–3	0–2	0–0	5–1	0–3	5–1	1–1	5–1	5–3		4–0	5–0	1–0
Watford	3–0	1–1	3–0	3–1	3–0	0–2	0–0	2–1	2–3	1–2	3–2	1–1	4–1	1–1	2–2	2–0	2–1	1–1	1–0		5–1	0–2
West Bromwich Albion	0–0	0–3	2–1	0–3	0–0	0–3	1–2	2–2	1–2	1–2	2–3	1–5	1–1	1–1	1–1	0–1	1–1	1–0	1–1	3–1		2–3
West Ham United	0–0	4–1	2–0	1–2	1–0	2–1	2–1	3–0	2–2	0–1	1–0	2–1	8–1	4–2	3–1	3–1	1–0	1–0	2–1	2–1	4–0	

Legend: Blue = home team win; Yellow = draw; Red = away team win.

=== Managerial changes ===
Team	Outgoing manager	Manner of departure	Date of vacancy	Position in table	Incoming manager	Date of appointment
Liverpool	(England) Joe Fagan	Retired	30 May 1985	Pre-season	(Scotland) Kenny Dalglish	30 May 1985
Southampton	(England) Lawrie McMenemy	Signed by Sunderland	8 June 1985	Pre-season	(Northern Ireland) Chris Nicholl	12 July 1985
Queens Park Rangers	(England) Frank Sibley	Became assistant manager	11 June 1985	Pre-season	(England) Jim Smith	11 June 1985
Oxford United	(England) Jim Smith	Signed by Queens Park Rangers	11 June 1985	Pre-season	(England) Maurice Evans	11 June 1985
Chelsea	(England) John Neal	Retired	12 June 1985	Pre-season	(England) John Hollins	12 June 1985
Newcastle United	(England) Jack Charlton	Resigned	10 August 1985	Pre-season	(Northern Ireland) Willie McFaul	10 August 1985
West Bromwich Albion	(Republic of Ireland) Johnny Giles	Resigned	29 September 1985	22nd	(England) Nobby Stiles	29 September 1985
Birmingham City	(England) Ron Saunders	Resigned	16 January 1986	21st	(England) John Bond	22 January 1986
West Bromwich Albion	(England) Nobby Stiles	Sacked	1 February 1986	22nd	(England) Ron Saunders	14 February 1986
Arsenal	(England) Don Howe	Resigned	22 March 1986	5th	(England) Steve Burtenshaw (caretaker)	22 March 1986
Coventry City	(Scotland) Don Mackay	Sacked	13 April 1986	20th	(England) John Sillett	13 April 1986

=== First Division maps ===
Locations of the Football League First Division London teams 1985–1986
Locations of the Football League First Division 1985–1986 teams

== Second Division ==
Second Division
- Season: 1985–86
- Champions: Norwich City
- Promoted: Norwich City; Charlton Athletic; Wimbledon
- Relegated: Carlisle United; Middlesbrough; Fulham
- Matches: 462
- Goals: 1,264 (2.74 per match)
- Top goalscorer: Kevin Drinkell (22 goals)

Pos	Team	Pld	W	D	L	GF	GA	GD	Pts	Qualification or relegation
1	Norwich City (C, P)	42	25	9	8	84	37	+47	84	Promotion to the First Division
2	Charlton Athletic (P)	42	22	11	9	78	45	+33	77	Promotion to the First Division
3	Wimbledon (P)	42	21	13	8	58	37	+21	76	Promotion to the First Division
4	Portsmouth	42	22	7	13	69	41	+28	73	
5	Crystal Palace	42	19	9	14	57	52	+5	66	
6	Hull City	42	17	13	12	65	55	+10	64	
7	Sheffield United	42	17	11	14	64	63	+1	62	
8	Oldham Athletic	42	17	9	16	62	61	+1	60	
9	Millwall	42	17	8	17	64	65	−1	59	
10	Stoke City	42	14	15	13	48	50	−2	57	
11	Brighton & Hove Albion	42	16	8	18	64	64	0	56	
12	Barnsley	42	14	14	14	47	50	−3	56	
13	Bradford City	42	16	6	20	51	63	−12	54	
14	Leeds United	42	15	8	19	56	72	−16	53	
15	Grimsby Town	42	14	10	18	58	62	−4	52	
16	Huddersfield Town	42	14	10	18	51	67	−16	52	
17	Shrewsbury Town	42	14	9	19	52	64	−12	51	
18	Sunderland	42	13	11	18	47	61	−14	50	
19	Blackburn Rovers	42	12	13	17	53	62	−9	49	
20	Carlisle United (R)	42	13	7	22	47	71	−24	46	Relegation to the Third Division
21	Middlesbrough (R)	42	12	9	21	44	53	−9	45	Relegation to the Third Division
22	Fulham (R)	42	10	6	26	45	69	−24	36	Relegation to the Third Division

Rules for classification: 1) Points; 2) Goal difference; 3) Goals scored
(C) Champions; (P) Promoted; (R) Relegated

=== Results ===
Home \ Away	BAR	BLB	BRA	B&HA	CRL	CHA	CRY	FUL	GRI	HUD	HUL	LEE	MID	MIL	NWC	OLD	POR	SHU	SHR	STK	SUN	WDN
Barnsley		1–1	2–2	3–2	1–2	2–1	2–4	2–0	1–0	1–3	1–4	3–0	0–0	2–1	2–2	1–0	0–1	2–1	2–0	0–0	1–1	0–1
Blackburn Rovers	0–3		3–0	1–4	2–0	0–0	1–2	1–0	3–1	0–1	2–2	2–0	0–1	1–2	2–1	0–0	1–0	6–1	1–1	0–1	2–0	2–0
Bradford City	2–0	3–2		3–2	1–0	1–2	1–0	3–1	0–1	3–0	4–2	0–1	2–1	0–2	0–2	1–0	2–1	1–4	3–1	3–1	2–0	1–1
Brighton & Hove Albion	0–1	3–1	2–1		6–1	3–5	2–0	2–3	2–2	4–3	3–1	0–1	3–3	1–0	1–1	1–1	2–3	0–0	0–2	2–0	3–1	2–0
Carlisle United	1–1	2–1	1–2	2–0		2–3	2–2	2–1	1–2	2–0	2–1	1–2	1–0	1–0	0–4	3–1	0–1	1–0	0–2	3–0	1–2	2–3
Charlton Athletic	2–1	3–0	1–1	2–2	3–0		3–1	2–0	2–0	3–0	1–2	4–0	2–0	3–3	1–0	1–1	1–2	2–0	4–1	2–0	2–1	0–0
Crystal Palace	1–0	2–0	2–1	1–0	1–1	2–1		0–0	2–1	2–3	0–2	3–0	2–1	2–1	1–2	3–2	2–1	1–1	0–1	0–1	1–0	1–3
Fulham	2–0	3–3	4–1	1–0	0–1	0–3	2–3		2–1	2–1	1–1	3–1	0–3	1–2	0–1	2–2	0–1	2–3	2–1	1–0	1–2	0–2
Grimsby Town	1–2	5–2	2–0	0–2	1–0	2–2	3–0	1–0		1–1	0–1	1–0	3–2	5–1	1–0	1–4	1–0	0–1	3–1	3–3	1–1	0–1
Huddersfield Town	1–1	0–0	2–0	1–0	3–3	0–2	0–0	1–3	2–2		2–1	3–1	0–3	4–3	0–0	2–0	1–2	3–1	1–0	2–0	2–0	0–1
Hull City	0–1	2–2	1–0	2–0	4–0	1–1	1–2	5–0	2–0	3–1		2–1	0–0	3–0	1–0	4–2	2–2	0–0	4–3	0–2	1–1	1–1
Leeds United	0–2	1–1	2–1	2–3	2–0	1–2	1–3	1–0	1–1	2–0	1–1		1–0	3–1	0–2	3–1	2–1	1–1	1–1	4–0	1–1	0–0
Middlesbrough	0–0	0–0	1–1	0–1	1–3	1–3	0–2	1–0	3–1	0–1	1–2	2–2		3–0	1–1	3–2	1–0	1–2	3–1	1–1	2–0	1–0
Millwall	2–2	0–1	2–1	0–1	3–1	2–2	3–2	1–1	1–0	2–1	5–0	3–1	3–0		4–2	0–1	0–4	3–0	2–0	2–3	1–0	0–1
Norwich City	1–1	3–0	0–0	3–0	2–1	3–1	4–3	2–1	3–2	4–1	2–0	4–0	2–0	6–1		1–0	2–0	4–0	3–1	1–1	0–0	1–2
Oldham Athletic	1–1	3–1	0–1	4–0	2–1	2–1	2–0	2–1	2–1	1–1	3–1	3–1	1–0	0–0	1–3		2–0	1–5	4–3	2–4	2–2	2–1
Portsmouth	1–1	3–0	4–0	1–2	4–0	1–0	1–0	1–1	3–1	4–1	1–1	2–3	1–0	2–1	2–0	1–2		0–3	4–0	3–0	3–0	1–1
Sheffield United	3–1	3–3	3–1	3–0	1–0	1–1	0–0	2–1	1–1	1–1	3–1	3–2	0–1	1–3	2–5	2–0	0–0		1–1	1–2	1–0	4–0
Shrewsbury Town	3–0	2–0	2–0	2–1	0–0	2–1	0–2	2–1	0–2	3–0	0–0	1–3	2–1	1–1	0–3	2–0	1–1	3–1		1–0	1–2	1–1
Stoke City	0–0	2–2	3–1	1–1	0–0	0–0	0–0	1–0	1–1	3–0	0–1	6–2	3–2	0–0	1–1	2–0	2–0	1–3	2–2		1–0	0–0
Sunderland	2–0	0–2	1–1	2–1	2–2	1–2	1–1	4–2	3–3	1–0	1–1	4–2	1–0	1–2	0–2	0–3	1–3	2–1	2–0	2–0		2–1
Wimbledon	1–0	1–1	1–0	0–0	4–1	3–1	1–1	1–0	3–0	2–2	3–1	0–3	3–0	1–1	2–1	0–0	1–3	5–0	2–1	1–0	3–0	

Legend: Blue = home team win; Yellow = draw; Red = away team win.

=== Second Division maps ===
Locations of the Football League Second Division London teams 1985–1986
Locations of the Football League Second Division 1985–1986 teams

== Third Division ==
Football LeagueThird Division
- Season: 1985–86
- Champions: Reading (1st title)
- Promoted: Derby County; Plymouth Argyle
- Relegated: Cardiff City; Lincoln City; Wolverhampton Wanderers; Swansea City
- Matches: 552
- Goals: 1,550 (2.81 per match)
- Top goalscorer: Trevor Senior (Reading), 27

Pos	Team	Pld	W	D	L	GF	GA	GD	Pts	Promotion or relegation
1	Reading (C, P)	46	29	7	10	67	51	+16	94	Promotion to the Second Division
2	Plymouth Argyle (P)	46	26	9	11	88	53	+35	87	Promotion to the Second Division
3	Derby County (P)	46	23	15	8	80	41	+39	84	Promotion to the Second Division
4	Wigan Athletic	46	23	14	9	82	48	+34	83	
5	Gillingham	46	22	13	11	81	54	+27	79	
6	Walsall	46	22	9	15	90	64	+26	75	
7	York City	46	20	11	15	77	58	+19	71	
8	Notts County	46	19	14	13	71	60	+11	71	
9	Bristol City	46	18	14	14	69	60	+9	68	
10	Brentford	46	18	12	16	58	61	−3	66	
11	Doncaster Rovers	46	16	16	14	45	52	−7	64	
12	Blackpool	46	17	12	17	66	55	+11	63	
13	Darlington	46	15	13	18	61	78	−17	58	
14	Rotherham United	46	15	12	19	61	59	+2	57	
15	Bournemouth	46	15	9	22	65	72	−7	54	
16	Bristol Rovers	46	14	12	20	51	75	−24	54	
17	Chesterfield	46	13	14	19	61	64	−3	53	
18	Bolton Wanderers	46	15	8	23	54	68	−14	53	
19	Newport County	46	11	18	17	52	65	−13	51	
20	Bury	46	12	13	21	63	67	−4	49	
21	Lincoln City (R)	46	10	16	20	55	77	−22	46	Relegation to the Fourth Division
22	Cardiff City (R)	46	12	9	25	53	83	−30	45	Relegation to the Fourth Division
23	Wolverhampton Wanderers (R)	46	11	10	25	57	98	−41	43	Relegation to the Fourth Division
24	Swansea City (R)	46	11	10	25	43	87	−44	43	Relegation to the Fourth Division

(C) Champions; (P) Promoted; (R) Relegated

=== Third Division results ===
Home \ Away	BOU	BLP	BOL	BRE	BRC	BRR	BRY	CAR	CHF	DAR	DER	DON	GIL	LIN	NPC	NTC	PLY	REA	ROT	SWA	WAL	WIG	WOL	YOR
AFC Bournemouth		1–4	2–1	0–0	5–0	6–1	2–1	1–1	3–2	4–2	1–1	1–1	2–3	2–2	0–1	0–0	1–3	0–1	1–2	4–0	0–1	0–2	3–2	2–0
Blackpool	2–0		1–1	4–0	2–1	4–2	5–0	3–0	0–1	0–0	0–1	4–0	2–2	2–0	0–0	1–3	1–1	0–0	2–1	2–0	2–1	1–2	0–1	0–2
Bolton Wanderers	1–0	1–3		1–2	0–4	0–2	1–4	5–0	2–1	0–3	0–1	2–0	0–1	1–1	4–0	1–0	3–1	2–0	1–1	1–1	3–1	1–2	4–1	1–1
Brentford	1–0	1–1	1–1		1–2	1–0	1–0	3–0	1–0	2–1	3–3	1–3	1–2	0–1	0–0	1–1	1–1	1–2	1–1	1–0	1–3	1–3	2–1	3–3
Bristol City	1–3	2–1	2–0	0–0		2–0	4–1	2–1	0–0	1–0	1–1	4–1	1–2	1–1	3–1	3–0	2–0	3–0	3–1	0–1	2–3	1–0	3–0	2–2
Bristol Rovers	2–3	1–0	2–1	0–1	1–1		2–1	2–1	1–1	3–1	0–0	1–0	1–0	0–0	2–0	1–1	1–2	0–2	5–2	0–0	0–1	1–1	1–1	0–1
Bury	3–0	4–1	2–1	0–0	6–3	1–1		3–0	1–1	0–1	1–1	1–2	1–2	4–0	1–1	2–4	0–1	3–1	2–0	2–2	2–1	0–0	3–1	4–2
Cardiff City	0–1	1–0	0–1	1–0	1–3	2–0	0–0		0–2	0–1	0–2	0–1	1–1	2–1	1–1	1–3	1–2	1–3	2–3	1–0	1–1	3–1	1–1	2–1
Chesterfield	0–1	1–2	3–0	1–3	0–0	2–0	4–3	3–4		1–0	1–0	0–0	1–1	2–2	3–1	2–2	1–2	3–4	2–0	4–1	2–3	1–1	3–0	1–0
Darlington	0–0	2–1	1–1	3–5	2–1	3–3	1–1	4–1	2–1		2–1	0–2	3–2	1–0	3–2	2–3	0–2	0–0	2–2	6–0	0–3	1–1	2–1	1–0
Derby County	3–0	1–2	2–1	1–1	2–0	0–2	1–1	2–1	0–0	1–1		1–1	2–0	7–0	1–1	2–0	1–2	1–1	2–1	5–1	3–1	1–0	4–2	2–1
Doncaster Rovers	1–1	0–0	1–1	1–0	1–1	0–2	1–0	0–2	2–0	1–0	0–3		2–3	1–1	1–1	2–1	1–0	0–1	0–0	0–0	1–0	2–2	0–1	1–1
Gillingham	2–0	2–2	2–1	1–2	1–1	2–0	1–0	2–0	1–1	1–1	1–2	4–0		2–0	0–1	4–0	1–1	3–0	3–0	5–1	5–2	2–0	2–0	1–2
Lincoln City	3–2	0–3	1–1	3–0	1–1	2–2	2–0	0–4	2–1	1–1	0–1	3–3	1–0		1–1	0–2	1–1	0–1	0–0	4–1	3–2	0–0	2–3	3–4
Newport County	2–1	1–1	0–1	1–2	1–1	3–0	1–0	1–2	3–3	3–0	1–1	2–2	1–1	1–2		1–2	3–1	0–2	0–0	2–0	1–5	3–4	3–1	1–1
Notts County	3–1	1–2	1–0	0–4	4–0	0–0	2–2	1–4	2–1	5–0	0–3	1–1	1–1	3–2	1–2		2–0	0–0	1–0	3–0	3–1	1–1	4–0	3–1
Plymouth Argyle	2–1	3–1	4–1	2–0	4–0	4–2	3–0	4–4	0–0	4–2	4–1	0–1	3–0	2–1	2–0	0–1		0–1	4–0	2–0	2–0	2–1	3–1	2–2
Reading	1–2	1–0	1–0	3–1	1–0	3–2	2–0	1–1	4–2	0–2	1–0	2–0	1–2	0–2	2–0	3–1	4–3		2–1	2–0	2–1	1–0	2–2	0–0
Rotherham United	4–1	4–1	4–0	1–2	2–0	2–0	2–0	3–0	1–2	1–2	1–1	2–1	1–1	1–0	0–0	1–0	1–1	1–2		4–1	3–0	0–0	1–2	4–1
Swansea City	1–1	2–0	3–1	2–0	1–3	0–1	1–0	3–1	1–1	2–2	0–3	0–2	2–2	3–1	1–1	0–0	0–2	2–3	1–0		2–1	0–1	0–2	1–0
Walsall	4–2	1–1	2–0	1–2	2–1	6–0	3–2	6–3	3–0	0–0	1–1	1–0	4–1	2–1	2–0	0–0	2–2	6–0	3–1	3–1		3–3	1–1	3–1
Wigan Athletic	3–0	1–1	1–3	4–0	1–1	4–0	1–0	2–0	2–0	5–1	2–1	4–1	3–3	3–2	0–0	3–1	3–0	1–0	2–0	5–0	2–0		5–3	1–0
Wolverhampton Wanderers	0–3	2–1	0–2	1–4	2–1	3–4	1–1	3–1	1–0	2–1	0–4	1–2	1–3	1–1	1–2	2–2	0–3	2–3	0–0	1–5	0–0	2–2		3–2
York City	2–1	3–0	3–0	1–0	1–1	4–0	0–0	1–1	2–0	7–0	1–3	0–1	2–0	2–1	3–1	2–2	3–1	0–1	2–1	3–1	1–0	4–1	2–1	

Source: Soccerbase
Legend: Blue = home team win; Yellow = draw; Red = away team win.

=== Third Division maps ===
Locations of the Football League Third Division teams 1985–1986
Locations of the Football League Third Division London teams 1985–1986

== Fourth Division ==
Football LeagueFourth Division
- Season: 1985–86
- Champions: Swindon Town (1st title)
- Promoted: Chester City; Mansfield Town; Port Vale
- Failed re-election: None
- Matches: 552
- Goals: 1,576 (2.86 per match)
- Top goalscorer: Steve Taylor (Rochdale), 25; Richard Cadette (Southend United), 25

Pos	Team	Pld	W	D	L	GF	GA	GD	Pts	Promotion or relegation
1	Swindon Town (C, P)	46	32	6	8	82	43	+39	102	Promotion to the Third Division
2	Chester City (P)	46	23	15	8	83	50	+33	84	Promotion to the Third Division
3	Mansfield Town (P)	46	23	12	11	74	47	+27	81	Promotion to the Third Division
4	Port Vale (P)	46	21	16	9	67	37	+30	79	Promotion to the Third Division
5	Orient	46	20	12	14	79	64	+15	72	
6	Colchester United	46	19	13	14	88	63	+25	70	
7	Hartlepool United	46	20	10	16	68	67	+1	70	
8	Northampton Town	46	18	10	18	79	58	+21	64	
9	Southend United	46	18	10	18	69	67	+2	64	
10	Hereford United	46	18	10	18	74	73	+1	64	
11	Stockport County	46	17	13	16	63	71	−8	64	
12	Crewe Alexandra	46	18	9	19	54	61	−7	63	
13	Wrexham	46	17	9	20	68	80	−12	60	Qualification for the European Cup Winners' Cup first round
14	Burnley	46	16	11	19	60	65	−5	59	
15	Scunthorpe United	46	15	14	17	50	55	−5	59	
16	Aldershot	46	17	7	22	66	74	−8	58	
17	Peterborough United	46	13	17	16	52	64	−12	56	
18	Rochdale	46	14	13	19	57	77	−20	55	
19	Tranmere Rovers	46	15	9	22	74	73	+1	54	
20	Halifax Town	46	14	12	20	60	71	−11	54	
21	Exeter City	46	13	15	18	47	59	−12	54	Re-elected
22	Cambridge United	46	15	9	22	65	80	−15	54	Re-elected
23	Preston North End	46	11	10	25	54	89	−35	43	Re-elected
24	Torquay United	46	9	10	27	43	88	−45	37	Re-elected

(C) Champions; (P) Promoted

=== Fourth Division results ===
Home \ Away	ALD	BUR	CAM	CHE	COL	CRE	EXE	HAL	HAR	HER	LEY	MAN	NOR	PET	PTV	PNE	ROC	SCU	STD	STP	SWI	TOR	TRA	WRE
Aldershot		0–2	2–1	1–1	1–1	3–2	4–0	1–2	0–1	2–0	1–1	1–2	1–0	1–0	0–0	4–0	2–1	2–1	1–3	6–1	2–4	1–1	3–1	6–0
Burnley	1–2		1–1	1–0	0–2	0–1	3–1	1–3	2–0	3–2	1–0	2–1	3–2	1–1	1–2	1–1	1–0	1–2	1–3	0–1	0–2	3–0	3–1	5–2
Cambridge United	0–2	0–4		3–2	1–3	1–0	1–1	4–0	4–2	4–0	1–2	4–2	2–5	3–1	1–3	2–0	1–0	0–1	1–2	1–2	1–1	3–0	3–2	4–3
Chester City	1–0	4–0	1–1		4–0	4–0	2–1	1–1	1–1	1–0	3–0	1–0	2–3	2–1	4–1	2–0	1–1	1–1	2–0	1–0	0–1	3–1	1–0	2–1
Colchester United	4–0	2–2	4–1	2–3		1–2	1–1	3–1	3–1	4–1	4–0	0–0	2–0	5–0	1–0	4–0	0–1	1–1	2–0	3–1	1–1	0–0	1–2	5–2
Crewe Alexandra	2–0	3–1	0–1	2–2	0–2		0–1	2–2	0–0	2–0	1–3	2–1	0–1	1–1	0–1	3–3	4–2	4–0	1–1	0–1	2–0	1–0	2–1	3–2
Exeter City	2–0	0–2	0–0	1–3	2–2	1–2		1–0	1–2	3–2	1–1	1–0	1–2	0–1	1–0	3–0	2–0	2–0	0–2	1–0	0–3	2–2	1–0	0–1
Halifax Town	1–1	2–2	1–1	1–2	2–2	1–0	1–0		3–2	1–0	2–1	1–2	2–0	1–1	2–0	2–1	1–1	2–1	2–3	0–0	1–3	0–0	1–2	5–2
Hartlepool United	2–1	3–1	2–1	1–1	4–1	4–1	0–0	3–0		2–1	1–2	1–1	2–1	2–1	1–1	1–0	2–0	0–1	1–1	3–2	1–0	1–0	1–0	3–3
Hereford United	4–1	2–2	1–0	0–2	2–0	4–1	4–1	2–1	2–2		3–2	4–2	3–0	2–1	1–1	1–1	2–2	1–1	2–1	3–2	4–1	4–1	1–4	3–1
Orient	1–1	3–0	3–1	0–0	1–2	0–1	2–2	1–0	1–1	2–2		0–1	0–1	2–2	1–0	2–0	5–0	3–0	3–0	0–1	1–0	4–2	3–1	1–3
Mansfield Town	2–0	0–0	2–0	0–0	2–1	2–2	2–1	2–0	4–0	4–0	1–1		1–0	0–1	2–1	2–3	3–2	1–1	3–0	4–2	1–1	4–0	0–1	1–1
Northampton Town	2–3	2–0	0–2	2–2	1–0	0–1	2–2	4–0	3–0	1–3	2–3	1–0		2–2	2–2	6–0	1–0	2–2	0–0	3–1	0–1	5–1	2–2	1–2
Peterborough United	3–0	0–0	0–0	3–0	1–2	0–0	1–1	1–1	3–1	0–0	2–2	4–2	0–5		1–0	1–1	1–1	1–0	1–1	2–0	3–0	2–0	0–1	1–1
Port Vale	3–1	1–1	4–1	1–1	1–1	3–0	0–0	3–2	4–0	1–0	2–0	0–0	0–0	2–0		0–1	1–1	3–1	4–0	1–1	3–0	0–0	0–0	4–0
Preston North End	1–3	1–0	1–2	3–6	3–2	1–2	2–2	0–1	2–1	2–0	1–3	0–2	1–1	2–4	0–1		1–1	0–1	3–2	1–2	0–3	4–0	2–2	1–0
Rochdale	2–0	1–0	2–1	1–2	3–3	1–0	1–1	1–0	0–2	1–1	1–4	1–1	3–2	2–1	3–3	1–1		1–0	2–1	4–1	1–2	5–0	1–1	3–2
Scunthorpe United	1–0	1–1	0–0	2–0	1–1	3–1	1–0	3–3	1–0	2–1	2–2	0–3	1–0	2–0	0–0	1–3	3–1		2–0	2–3	0–2	4–0	0–1	1–1
Southend United	2–0	2–3	1–0	1–1	2–4	0–1	2–0	2–1	3–2	3–1	5–1	3–1	0–4	0–1	2–1	2–1	5–0	2–1		0–0	0–0	1–2	2–2	3–0
Stockport County	3–2	1–1	3–1	2–2	1–1	3–0	1–1	2–1	1–3	1–1	2–3	0–2	1–0	2–2	1–2	2–1	3–0	0–0	2–1		0–2	1–1	1–1	2–0
Swindon Town	4–1	3–1	1–0	4–2	2–1	1–0	2–1	3–1	3–2	1–0	4–1	2–1	3–2	3–0	0–0	4–1	4–0	1–1	2–1	1–0		2–1	2–1	0–1
Torquay United	1–2	2–0	1–1	0–3	2–1	0–0	1–2	2–0	1–3	2–1	2–2	1–2	1–1	2–0	0–1	1–0	1–2	1–0	2–2	4–3	0–1		1–2	1–3
Tranmere Rovers	3–0	2–1	6–2	2–3	3–4	0–1	0–1	0–3	4–2	1–2	0–3	1–2	1–3	7–0	1–2	2–3	2–0	2–1	1–1	2–3	3–1	2–0		1–3
Wrexham	4–1	0–1	6–2	1–1	2–1	2–1	1–1	2–1	1–0	0–1	1–3	1–2	1–0	0–1	1–3	1–1	2–0	1–0	0–0	3–0	0–1	3–2	1–1	

Source: Soccerbase
Legend: Blue = home team win; Yellow = draw; Red = away team win.

=== Fourth Division maps ===
Locations of the Football League Fourth Division London teams 1985–1986
Locations of the Football League Fourth Division teams 1985–1986

== Election/Re-election to the Football League ==
As champions of the Alliance Premier League, Enfield won the right to apply for election to the Football League, to replace one of the four bottom teams in the 1985–86 Football League Fourth Division. The vote went as follows:

Club	Final Position	Votes
Exeter City	21st (Fourth Division)	64
Preston North End	23rd (Fourth Division)	62.5
Cambridge United	22nd (Fourth Division)	61
Torquay United	24th (Fourth Division)	61
Enfield	1st (Alliance Premier League)	7.5

Hence, all four Football League teams were re-elected, and Enfield were denied membership of the Football League.

This was the last season in which the Alliance Premier League champions had to apply for election to the Football League. From the 1986–87 season, when the Alliance Premier League was re-branded as the Football Conference, the champions were automatically promoted, provided that they met the criteria set by the Football League.

== Attendances ==
=== Division One ===
#	Club	Average	Highest	Lowest
1	Manchester United	46,321	54,575	32,331
2	Liverpool FC	35,271	45,445	26,219
3	Everton FC	32,226	51,348	23,357
4	Manchester City FC	24,229	48,773	18,899
5	Arsenal FC	23,824	45,107	14,821
6	Newcastle United FC	23,434	32,183	16,785
7	Sheffield Wednesday FC	23,111	48,105	13,359
8	Chelsea FC	21,985	43,900	12,017
9	West Ham United FC	21,179	31,121	12,225
10	Tottenham Hotspur FC	20,859	33,835	9,359
11	Nottingham Forest FC	16,809	30,171	11,538
12	Watford FC	15,360	18,960	11,510
13	Aston Villa FC	15,237	27,626	8,456
14	Southampton FC	14,877	19,784	12,167
15	Ipswich Town FC	14,469	20,682	11,528
16	Queens Park Rangers FC	12,808	21,122	8,085
17	West Bromwich Albion FC	12,164	24,962	6,201
18	Leicester City FC	11,793	26,070	7,237
19	Coventry City FC	11,590	16,898	7,478
20	Luton Town FC	11,062	17,454	8,550
21	Oxford United FC	11,009	13,939	9,020
22	Birmingham City FC	10,900	24,971	5,833

=== Division Two ===
#	Club	Average	Highest	Lowest
1	Sunderland AFC	16,052	21,144	11,338
2	Norwich City FC	13,722	18,956	11,148
3	Portsmouth FC	13,614	18,859	9,560
4	Leeds United FC	13,259	21,128	9,638
5	Sheffield United FC	10,798	13,854	7,367
6	Brighton & Hove Albion FC	9,726	16,717	6,258
7	Stoke City FC	8,288	11,875	6,449
8	Hull City AFC	7,672	12,824	5,344
9	Huddersfield Town AFC	6,821	11,667	4,511
10	Crystal Palace FC	6,787	11,731	3,744
11	Middlesbrough FC	6,257	19,701	4,061
12	Barnsley FC	6,067	9,410	3,827
13	Charlton Athletic FC	6,028	13,214	3,059
14	Blackburn Rovers FC	5,826	9,666	3,616
15	Bradford City AFC	5,816	10,751	3,426
16	Millwall FC	5,459	9,158	3,188
17	Grimsby Town FC	5,157	9,121	3,476
18	Oldham Athletic FC	4,651	8,195	2,510
19	Fulham FC	4,624	9,281	2,134
20	Wimbledon FC	4,578	9,046	2,351
21	Carlisle United FC	4,010	9,249	2,418
22	Shrewsbury Town FC	3,927	9,595	2,364

=== Division Three ===
#	Club	Average	Highest	Lowest
1	Derby County FC	12,386	21,030	9,571
2	Plymouth Argyle FC	8,297	24,888	3,686
3	Reading FC	6,893	13,465	3,410
4	Bristol City FC	6,600	12,171	4,395
5	Walsall FC	4,891	10,480	3,282
6	Bolton Wanderers FC	4,847	9,252	2,902
7	Blackpool FC	4,536	9,473	1,995
8	Notts County FC	4,404	13,086	2,345
9	Swansea City AFC	4,306	6,989	2,779
10	Bristol Rovers FC	4,196	9,926	2,959
11	Wigan Athletic FC	4,148	9,485	2,657
12	York City FC	4,111	6,045	2,857
13	Wolverhampton Wanderers FC	4,020	9,166	2,205
14	Brentford FC	3,957	6,351	2,824
15	Gillingham FC	3,691	5,710	2,050
16	Rotherham United FC	3,474	6,030	2,101
17	AFC Bournemouth	3,424	6,105	1,873
18	Chesterfield FC	3,212	9,394	1,773
19	Cardiff City FC	3,061	8,375	1,663
20	Darlington FC	3,027	4,255	1,615
21	Bury FC	2,889	6,006	1,720
22	Doncaster Rovers FC	2,804	4,617	1,659
23	Lincoln City FC	2,617	6,237	1,379
24	Newport County AFC	2,494	6,461	1,508

=== Division Four ===
#	Club	Average	Highest	Lowest
1	Swindon Town FC	6,531	12,470	3,299
2	Mansfield Town FC	3,764	8,420	2,357
3	Port Vale FC	3,581	5,976	2,461
4	Preston North End FC	3,502	5,585	2,007
5	Burnley FC	3,204	4,279	1,988
6	Chester City FC	2,953	5,253	1,473
7	Southend United FC	2,785	8,119	1,006
8	Hereford United FC	2,756	4,094	1,857
9	Stockport County FC	2,667	4,690	1,354
10	Leyton Orient FC	2,629	3,713	1,443
11	Hartlepool United FC	2,593	4,195	1,282
12	Peterborough United FC	2,590	3,866	1,512
13	Northampton Town FC	2,385	4,449	1,167
14	Colchester United FC	2,328	3,927	1,356
15	Cambridge United FC	2,089	3,234	1,235
16	Exeter City FC	1,972	2,868	1,369
17	Wrexham AFC	1,820	3,519	912
18	Crewe Alexandra FC	1,817	4,986	1,009
19	Rochdale AFC	1,790	2,600	936
20	Scunthorpe United FC	1,778	2,495	1,238
21	Tranmere Rovers	1,566	3,188	1,031
22	Aldershot Town FC	1,480	3,723	1,027
23	Halifax Town AFC	1,406	2,334	732
24	Torquay United FC	1,240	2,558	850

== See also ==
- 1985–86 in English football
