= David Rocastle =

English footballer (1967–2001)

- Rocastle in the 1990s

Personal information
- Full name: David Carlyle Rocastle
- Date of birth: 2 May 1967
- Place of birth: Lewisham, London, England
- Date of death: 31 March 2001 (aged 33)
- Place of death: Slough, England
- Height: 5 ft 9 in (1.75 m)
- Position: Midfielder

Youth career
- 1982–1985: Arsenal

Senior career*
Years	Team	Apps	(Gls)
1985–1992	Arsenal	218	(24)
1992–1993	Leeds United	25	(2)
1993–1994	Manchester City	21	(2)
1994–1998	Chelsea	29	(0)
1997	→ Norwich City (loan)	11	(0)
1997	→ Hull City (loan)	11	(1)
1998–1999	Sabah	13	(8)
Total		328	(37)

International career
1986–1988	England U21	14	(2)
1988–1992	England B	2	(0)
1988–1992	England	14	(0)
- * Club domestic league appearances and goals

David Carlyle Rocastle (2 May 1967 – 31 March 2001) was an English professional footballer who played as a midfielder in the roles of a playmaker and a winger.

He spent the majority of his career at Arsenal where he was nicknamed "Rocky". Rocastle then went on to feature in the Premier League for Leeds United, Manchester City and Chelsea, before playing in the Football League for Norwich City and Hull City and finishing his career in Malaysia with Sabah FA. Rocastle also played for the England national team, in all earning 14 international caps for the Three Lions.

Arsène Wenger, who became Arsenal manager four years after Rocastle left the club, has described him as "a modern player, because the revolution of the game has gone on to more technique, and more skill" and as having an "exceptional dimension as a footballer". Rocastle is seen as a universally popular, iconic and legendary figure by many Arsenal fans, who often still chant his name at matches. The David Rocastle indoor centre at Arsenal's academy is named after him and his name is displayed at the Emirates Stadium.

== Club career ==
Rocastle was born in Lewisham on 2 May 1967 to Caribbean immigrants Leslie and Linda Rocastle, who moved to London during the 1950s. His father died aged 29 in 1972 from pneumonia when Rocastle was five years old, and his mother Linda subsequently remarried and had two more children. Rocastle attended the Turnham Primary School and the Roger Manwood secondary school in his teenage years.

=== Arsenal ===
After being rejected by Millwall, Rocastle joined Arsenal's Academy under Terry Neill in May 1982 and was given a professional contract in December 1984 by Neill's successor Don Howe. In his early career he faced problems with his eyesight, and contact lenses had to be used. According to his teammate Martin Keown "They couldn't work out why Rocastle was running around dribbling with his head down. So they took him to the halfway line and said: 'Can you see the goal?' and he couldn't. His eyesight was terrible. They sorted him out with contact lenses and his career took off."

He made his debut against Newcastle United 28 September 1985 and made 16 league appearances in the 1985–86 season, scoring once, against Aston Villa 8 March 1986, as Arsenal finished seventh in the league. Rocastles first goal came three weeks earlier in the FA-cup game against Luton Town 15 February which ended in a 2–2 draw. He remained a regular player in the first team following the departure of Don Howe and the appointment of George Graham as manager in May 1986.

In January 1987, Arsenal were away to Manchester United at Old Trafford. During the match Rocastle was sent off for retaliating to a tackle by United midfielder Norman Whiteside, a move which caused a huge scuffle between several of the opposing players. This scenario has been illustrated by many as the start of the fierce rivalry which now exists between the two clubs, especially as the two clubs being actively involved in competition for major honours almost every season since.

Rocastle, still only 19, went on to score the winning goal in the 1986–87 League Cup semi-final replay against Tottenham Hotspur which was won by a margin of 2 goals to 1 at White Hart Lane. The month before his 20th birthday he won a 1986–87 League Cup winners medal as Arsenal beat Liverpool 2–1 in the cup final at Wembley. Due to his feats during this season, Rocastle was bestowed with the honour of being named in the 1986–87 PFA Team of the Year and as well won the 1987 Barclays Young Eagle award. In the following season, he was again an influential member of the Arsenal side which reached the 1987–88 League Cup final against Luton Town the following year. In the game Arsenal surrendered a 2–1 lead with only seven minutes of the final left to play, and ended up losing 3–2 to a last minute Luton goal. He was also ever present for the Gunners in the 1987–88 season, helping Arsenal win the Football League Centenary Trophy in a 2–1 win over Manchester United.

Rocastle's first league championship with Arsenal came in 1988–89, when he played in every game that season. Rocastle's memorable solo strike against Middlesbrough 19 November 1988 and a lob from 30 yards against Aston Villa 31 December 1988 stood out during the title winning season. The success was sealed when they beat Liverpool 2–0 in the final game of the season at Anfield, snatching the title from the hosts on goals scored. Once again Rocastle won the Barclays Young Eagle award, with the honour bestowed upon him at the end of the 1989 season. Arsenal were however unable to compete in the 1989–90 European Cup because the ban on English clubs in European competition after the 1985 Heysel tragedy still had one year to run, but Rocastle would have the chance of playing in Europe's premier club competition twice over the next few seasons. Arsenal went on to finish fourth in the 1989–90 league season, missing out on a return to Europe as only the runners-up were entitled to a UEFA Cup place. Rocastle was struggling with a knee injury and had a decline in form, so he had an exploratory surgery on his knee to come back before the end of the season.

In 1990–91, Rocastle was limited to just 16 league appearances but he still played more than enough games to win another league title medal with Arsenal, who lost only one game that season. He started the games in the first two months of that winning season. Rocastle played against Manchester United 20 October 1990 at Old Trafford, and was involved and fined after the brawl. When he returned after two months absence at Boxing Day against Derby County, he broke his toe in the first minute of the game, and a new operation of his knee was also required.

The following season, he played 39 league games for the Gunners, and a renaissance for Rocastle playing in a modified role in central midfield. The new signing Ian Wright and Rocastle were childhood friends who went on to represent the Gunners together in the 1991–92 campaign. His last appearance in an Arsenal shirt was against Southampton 2 May 1992 in a 5–1 win. He scored four league goals in his last season. The most memorable, on 19 October 1991, was a lob from 25 yards over Peter Schmeichel at Old Trafford in a 1–1 draw. His last goal for Arsenal, again against Manchester United at Highbury 1 February 1992 in a 1–1 draw, came from a cross from Wright. Rocastle was also tasting European football for the first time as Arsenal reached the second round of the European Cup.

In seven seasons for Arsenal, Rocastle played 277 first team games and scored 34 goals, collecting two league title medals and a winner's medal in the League Cup, and playing the 1989 FA Charity Shield and 1991 FA Charity Shield at Wembley.

Despite his return to fitness during 1991–92, some fine performances, his general popularity, and stated opposition to the deal, on 23 July 1992 Rocastle's spell at Arsenal came to an end when he was sold to reigning league champions Leeds United. The deal dismayed many Arsenal fans, teammates and football writers because of the way it was handled by manager George Graham, .

=== Leeds United ===
Rocastle's arrival at Leeds United made him, up to that point, the club's' most expensive signing at up to £2 million. Manager Howard Wilkinson saw Rocastle as an eventual replacement for the veteran midfielder Gordon Strachan. However, Strachan would go on to spend nearly three more years at Elland Road and remained a regular first team player for two more seasons, by which time Rocastle had left the West Yorkshire club. He went on to play a total of 34 games for Leeds, only half of them in the starting line-up.

He made his debut for the club in a European Cup tie away to Bundesliga side VfB Stuttgart 16 September 1992 in a 3–0 defeat. Rocastle did not start in the new Premier League until 21 November against his former club Arsenal in a 3–0 win at Elland Road. He scored his first goal for Leeds in a 1–0 win against Manchester City 13 March 1993. Many Leeds fans would have liked to see the manager Wilkinson place more faith in Rocastle, because he was a popular figure, with glimpses of his outstanding technical ability shining through in spite of repeated injury problems. Rocastle scored his second and last goal in the following season for Leeds in a 4–1 victory over Chelsea 6 November 1993. His last game for Leeds came in the Premier League as a substitute for Strachan against Arsenal 18 December 1993.

=== Manchester City ===
Late in December 1993, he moved to Maine Road as replacement for David White, who in turn had joined Leeds earlier that month. Rocastle moved to City in a straight swap valued at £2 million and he made his debut against Southampton in a 1–1 draw 28 December 1993.

He was an instant hit with the fans and his class shone through immediately in a side that included a number of budget signings. Even though he was only 26, he had suffered numerous injuries in recent seasons and they were beginning to take their toll. But Rocastle still had what it took to thrill the City fans and, against Ipswich Town 5 February 1994, he produced one moment of Brazilian skill that set up a goal for Carl Griffiths and all but lifted the roof off Maine Road. It was a dummy, feign and drag back that saw him spin away from three defenders before his low cross was turned in by Griffiths at the near post to make it 1–1.

In Manchester City Rocastle scored two goals as City finished 16th in the Premier League – their lowest finish since winning promotion to the top flight in 1989. Rocastle scored the winning goal against Swindon Town 26 February 1994, and his second 5 March against Queens Park Rangers in a 1–1 draw at Loftus Road. He made 23 appearances for the club before moving to Chelsea shortly before the start of the 1994-95 season.

=== Chelsea ===
By the time Rocastle arrived at Chelsea from Man City in August 1994 for £1.25 million, his knee problem was common knowledge in the game. However, Chelsea manager Glenn Hoddle took the view that sixty minutes of Rocastle was worth ninety minutes of many other players. Hence he started regularly, but was substituted in two-thirds of the thirty-nine games he played that first season. His debut came 20 August 1994 at Stamford Bridge against Norwich City in a 2–0 win. Rocastle would go on to play 40 times for Chelsea and scored two goals in his time there. One of these came in a League Cup win over AFC Bournemouth, with the other being netted in a 1995 European Cup Winners Cup first-round game against FK Viktoria Žižkov. His performance in midfield on a memorable night 14 March 1995, when a 1–0 deficit against Club Brugge KV was overturned to send Chelsea through to the final-four, was probably his finest hour for them, even though he was inevitably substituted with thirty minutes to go. His experience proved invaluable throughout a European Cup-Winners Cup run which ended at the Semi-Final stage, going out to eventual winners Real Zaragoza by a single goal on aggregate.

Injury problems returned to haunt Rocastle in 1995–96, and he played just one game all season at Blackburn Rovers 28 October 1995. This would be the last game that Rocastle played for Chelsea, although he remained with the club until his contract at Chelsea expired in the summer of 1998.

Rocastle was loaned out to Norwich City in Division One, and made his Norwich debut against Grimsby Town on 18 January 1997. Rocastle impressed the Norwich fans with his intelligent passing and commitment and Mike Walker extended his loan spell for a second month. However Norwich were unable to meet his wage demands and Rocastle returned to Chelsea after 11 games in yellow and green. Rocastle also had trials with clubs including Aberdeen and Southampton shortly afterwards.

In October 1997, Rocastle was loaned out to Hull City in Division Three, and scored on his debut for the Tigers against Scarborough. Rocastle's final appearance for Hull City, a 2–1 defeat at home to Chester on Boxing Day 1997, also proved to be his last in English football.

=== Sabah FA ===
Rocastle eventually left Chelsea in 1998 to join up with Malaysian team Sabah on a free transfer. He quickly became a highly influential and popular player at the club and still had the knack of occasionally producing outstanding goals. Perhaps the best from his Malaysia stint was a long-range effort in a 4–1 home win against Perak, at the Likas Stadium in Kota Kinabalu, as Rocastle volleyed the ball in from 50 metres. Rocastle then saw Sabah upon a memorable run to the 1998 Malaysian FA Cup final where he earned a runners up medal. He eventually brought his playing days to an end in December 1999 due to injury.

== International career ==
After making two appearances for the England 'B' side, Rocastle was capped 14 times at under-21 level for England during the second half of the 1980s, scoring twice. Whilst playing for the Young Lions, he earned a runners-up medal in the 1988 Toulon Tournament and got to the UEFA European Under-21 Championship semi-finals of the same year.

Aged 21, he was capped at senior level for the first time against Denmark on 14 September 1988. Rocastle never found himself on the losing side as England won seven of the internationals that he appeared in and drew the other seven. A knee operation in 1990 put him out of World Cup contention after he had been an England regular. Rocastle was excluded although he had played in five of England's six World Cup qualifying matches. He was one of 26 players chosen by the manager, Bobby Robson, to go to training camp before the tournament, but he was one of four dropped from the official 22-man squad. Graham Taylor recalled Rocastle three times afterwards but he wasn't selected for the 1992 Euros. His final appearance for England came just after his 25th birthday, on 17 May 1992 against Brazil. Rocastle won 14 full caps for England but did not score.

== Illness and death ==
In February 2001, Rocastle announced that he was suffering from an aggressive form of non-Hodgkin's lymphoma (a cancer which attacks the immune system). He underwent a course of chemotherapy and was hopeful of a recovery but died on 31 March 2001 in the company of his wife and children. It was later revealed that Rocastle's lymphoma had been diagnosed as terminal at diagnosis in October 2000.

Rocastle was the first player to have played in the Premier League to die, almost a decade after its formation, and the first to have been capped at senior level by England during the 1990s.

Six weeks after Rocastle's death, his nine-year-old son Ryan was Arsenal's mascot for their FA Cup final match against Liverpool, a match in which they took the lead but ultimately lost 2–1.

Five years and a day after his death, 1 April 2006 was designated "David Rocastle Day", as part of the celebrations of Arsenal's final season at Highbury. Upon the day a league game was played which saw a brace from Thierry Henry in an eventual 5–0 win for Arsenal over Aston Villa. Fans paid tribute to Rocastle before the start of the match with a minute's applause.

In August 2006, Arsenal opened the David Rocastle indoor centre at the club's academy, located at Hale End in Walthamstow, London. Rocastle is also one of 32 Arsenal legends honoured by having their images illustrated on the side of the new Emirates Stadium. On 30 March 2013, Arsenal played a game which marked the 12-year anniversary of Rocastle's death. The fans sang his name throughout the first ten minutes, and his famous quote of "Remember who you are, what you are, and who you represent!" was shown on the screen. Just after this, Arsenal scored the first goal in a 4–1 victory in the match against Reading. Hull City paid tribute to Rocastle by erecting a sign in his honour at the KC Stadium for their league match against Arsenal in May 2015. On 2 April 2016, Arsenal's fans paid another similar tribute to him at the Emirates during Arsenal's match against Watford, which marked the 15th anniversary of Rocastle's death.

In 2026, Arsenal names one of their typefaces after him, a blackletter designed by David Rudnick.

== Personal life ==
Rocastle had three children with his wife Janet – son Ryan and daughters Melissa and Monique.

He is the cousin of another professional footballer, Craig Rocastle, and his brother Stephen played for Norwich City and was on the books of Derry City as well.

== The David Rocastle Trust ==
The David Rocastle Trust was a charity based in London, UK founded in memory of Rocastle. The charity, which was chosen by Arsenal as their club charity for the 2005–06 season, supported Rocastle's family as well as community projects and other registered charities. The charity shut down in 2010.

== Career statistics ==
Appearances and goals by club, season and competition
Club	Season	League			National cup		League cup		Continental		Total	
Club	Season	Division	Apps	Goals	Apps	Goals	Apps	Goals	Apps	Goals	Apps	Goals
Arsenal	1985–86	First Division	16	1	5	1	3	0	0	0	24	2
Arsenal	1986–87	First Division	36	2	4	1	8	2	0	0	48	5
Arsenal	1987–88	First Division	40	7	4	2	8	3	0	0	52	12
Arsenal	1988–89	First Division	38	6	2	0	5	1	0	0	45	7
Arsenal	1989–90	First Division	33	2	3	0	4	0	0	0	40	2
Arsenal	1990–91	First Division	16	2	1	0	2	0	0	0	19	2
Arsenal	1991–92	First Division	39	4	1	0	3	0	4	0	47	4
Arsenal	Total		218	24	20	4	33	6	4	0	275	34
Leeds United	1992–93	Premier League	18	1	3	0	2	0	3	0	26	1
Leeds United	1993–94	Premier League	7	1	0	0	1	0	0	0	8	1
Leeds United	Total		25	2	3	0	3	0	2	0	34	2
Manchester City	1993–94	Premier League	21	2	2	0	0	0	0	0	23	2
Chelsea	1994–95	Premier League	28	0	0	0	3	1	8	1	39	2
Chelsea	1995–96	Premier League	1	0	0	0	0	0	0	0	1	0
Chelsea	Total		29	0	0	0	3	1	8	1	40	2
Norwich City	1996–97	First Division	11	0								
Hull City	1997–98	Third Division	11	1								
Sabah	1998	Liga Perdana 1	13	8								
Sabah	1999	Liga Perdana 1		5		1						6
Sabah	Total											
Career total												

== Honours ==
Arsenal

- Football League First Division: 1988–89, 1990–91
- Football League Cup: 1986–87; runner-up: 1987–88
- FA Charity Shield: 1991 (shared)
- Football League Centenary Trophy: 1988

Leeds United

- FA Charity Shield: 1992

Sabah

- Piala FA: runner-up 1998

England youth

- Toulon Tournament: runner-up 1988

Individual

- PFA Team of the Year: 1986–87 First Division, 1988–89 First Division
- Arsenal Player of the Season: 1985–86
- Barclays Young Eagle: 1987 & 1989
