= Steve Burtenshaw =

English footballer and manager (1935–2022)

Personal information
- Full name: Stephen Burtenshaw
- Date of birth: 23 November 1935
- Place of birth: Portslade, England
- Date of death: 17 February 2022 (aged 86)
- Place of death: Worthing, England
- Height: 5 ft 11 in (1.80 m)
- Position: Wing half

Youth career
- –: Brighton & Hove Albion

Senior career*
Years	Team	Apps	(Gls)
1952–1966	Brighton & Hove Albion	237	(3)

Managerial career
- 1973–1975: Sheffield Wednesday
- 1977: Everton (caretaker)
- 1978–1979: Queens Park Rangers
- 1986: Arsenal (caretaker)
- * Club domestic league appearances and goals

Stephen Burtenshaw (23 November 1935 – 17 February 2022) was an English football player and manager. Burtenshaw played as a wing half for Brighton & Hove Albion. As a manager, he was at the helm of clubs Sheffield Wednesday, Everton, Queens Park Rangers and Arsenal.

== Career ==
Burtenshaw started off his playing days in 1952 featuring as a wing half for Brighton & Hove Albion. At Albion, he won the Third Division (South) title in 1957–58. He lifted the Fourth Division title in 1964–65 with the Seagulls. Altogether he played 237 games in the Football League for Brighton & Hove.

After his playing days came to an end Burtenshaw became a coach at Brighton. Amongst the players he took under his wing was Howard Wilkinson, the future First Division winning manager of Leeds United.

Burtenshaw joined Arsenal as a coach in 1971, succeeding Don Howe after his departure to West Bromwich Albion. Burtenshaw stayed for two years before resigning, despite the club reaching an FA Cup final and coming second in the First Division.

Soon after, he moved to Sheffield Wednesday and spent two years there as manager. He later became a coach at Everton, managing the side in a caretaker capacity for three games in January 1977 after the club sacked Billy Bingham. He also went on to be at the helm of club Queens Park Rangers from 1978 to 1979.

Burtenshaw later returned to Arsenal as a coach and scout, and was caretaker manager of the club between March and May 1986, after the resignation of Don Howe as manager; Arsenal finished seventh in the First Division that season. He returned to his coaching role after the club appointed George Graham that summer. Burtenshaw's time at the club was overshadowed when he admitted taking "bungs" for signing John Jensen, in the scandal that led to Graham's sacking as Arsenal manager. He was fined £7,500 with £2,500 costs by the Football Association.

After leaving Arsenal along with Bruce Rioch in 1996, Burtenshaw became chief scout under Stewart Houston at Queens Park Rangers. Despite suffering a stroke in 2001 he later joined Kevin Keegan as scout at Manchester City, before retiring from football altogether.

== Death ==
Burtenshaw died on 17 February 2022, at the age of 86.

== Honours ==
Brighton and Hove Albion

- Third Division (South): 1957–58
- Fourth Division: 1964–65
