= 1985–86 FA Cup =

Tournament details
- Country: England; Wales

Final positions
- Champions: Liverpool (3rd title)
- Runners-up: Everton

Tournament statistics
- Top goal scorer: Ian Rush (6)

The 1985–86 FA Cup was the 105th season of the world's oldest knockout football competition, the Football Association Challenge Cup, or FA Cup. The competition was won by Liverpool, who defeated local rivals Everton 3–1 at Wembley in the first ever Merseyside derby final. Liverpool thus became only the fifth club to win the league and FA Cup double.

== Qualifying rounds ==
Most participating clubs that were not members of the Football League competed in the qualifying rounds to secure one of 28 places available in the first round.

The winners from the fourth qualifying round were Frickley Athletic, South Liverpool, Whitby Town, Scarborough, Morecambe, Chorley, Macclesfield Town, Runcorn, Enfield, Dagenham, Nuneaton Borough, Leyton-Wingate, Wycombe Wanderers, Chelmsford City, VS Rugby, Halesowen Town, Bishop's Stortford, Aylesbury United, Dartford, Yeovil Town, Farnborough Town, Slough Town, Bath City, Windsor & Eton, Fareham Town, Maidstone United, Bognor Regis Town and Weymouth.

For only the third time since the introduction of qualifying rounds, all 28 clubs advancing to the first round had appeared in the competition proper before. However, Bath City had not featured at this stage since 1977–78, South Liverpool had not done so since 1972–73, Halesowen Town and Leyton-Wingate (as Leyton F.C.) had not done so since 1955–56, and Aylesbury United had not done so since 1951–52.

On the other hand, Yeovil Town was advancing from the qualifying rounds for a new record-establishing 36th time. They did this in the absence from this season's main draw of Kettering Town, who had jointly set the previous marks with Yeovil in each of the preceding five tournaments.

== First round proper ==
The 48 teams from the Football League Third and Fourth Divisions entered in this round along with the 28 non-league clubs from the qualifying rounds and Wealdstone, Boston United, Altrincham and Telford United who were given byes. The first round of games were played over the weekend 16–17 November 1985. Replays were played on the 19th–20th. The round included two clubs from Step 8 of the English football pyramid: Whitby Town from the Northern League and Halesowen Town from the West Midlands (Regional) League.

Tie no	Home team	Score	Away team	Date
1	Enfield (5)	0–2	Bognor Regis Town (6)	16 November 1985
2	AFC Bournemouth	0–0	Dartford (5)	16 November 1985
Replay	Dartford	0–2	AFC Bournemouth	19 November 1985
3	Bury	2–0	Chester City	16 November 1985
4	Rochdale	2–1	Darlington	16 November 1985
5	Yeovil Town (6)	2–4	Hereford United	16 November 1985
6	Reading	1–0	Wealdstone (5)	16 November 1985
7	Walsall	7–3	Preston North End	16 November 1985
8	Gillingham	3–0	Northampton Town	16 November 1985
9	Notts County	6–1	Scarborough (5)	17 November 1985
10	Macclesfield Town (6)	1–2	Hartlepool United	16 November 1985
11	Derby County	5–1	Crewe Alexandra	16 November 1985
12	Lincoln City	0–1	Blackpool	16 November 1985
13	Swindon Town	0–0	Bristol City	17 November 1985
Replay	Bristol City	4–2	Swindon Town	20 November 1985
14	Wrexham	3–1	Bolton Wanderers	16 November 1985
15	Tranmere Rovers	2–2	Chesterfield	16 November 1985
Replay	Chesterfield	0–1	Tranmere Rovers	19 November 1985
16	Stockport County	0–1	Telford United (5)	16 November 1985
17	Windsor & Eton (6)	1–1	Torquay United	16 November 1985
Replay	Torquay United	3–0	Windsor & Eton	19 November 1985
18	Chorley (6)	0–2	Altrincham (5)	16 November 1985
19	Wycombe Wanderers (5)	2–0	Colchester United	16 November 1985
20	Brentford	1–3	Bristol Rovers	16 November 1985
21	Plymouth Argyle	1–0	Aldershot	16 November 1985
22	Southend United	0–1	Newport County	16 November 1985
23	Exeter City	2–1	Cardiff City	16 November 1985
24	Mansfield Town	1–1	Port Vale	16 November 1985
Replay	Port Vale	1–0	Mansfield Town	18 November 1985
25	Halifax Town	1–3	Scunthorpe United	16 November 1985
26	Runcorn (5)	2–2	Boston United (5)	16 November 1985
Replay	Boston United	1–1	Runcorn	20 November 1985
Replay	Runcorn	4–1	Boston United	25 November 1985
27	York City	0–0	Morecambe (6)	16 November 1985
Replay	Morecambe	0–2	York City	19 November 1985
28	Bishop's Stortford (6)	2–2	Peterborough United	16 November 1985
Replay	Peterborough United	3–1	Bishop's Stortford	20 November 1985
29	Rotherham United	6–0	Wolverhampton Wanderers	16 November 1985
30	Wigan Athletic	4–1	Doncaster Rovers	16 November 1985
31	Chelmsford City (6)	1–0	Weymouth (5)	16 November 1985
32	Nuneaton Borough (5)	2–3	Burnley	16 November 1985
33	Slough Town (6)	2–2	Aylesbury United (6)	16 November 1985
Replay	Aylesbury United	2–5	Slough Town	19 November 1985
34	Whitby Town (8)	1–0	South Liverpool (6)	16 November 1985
35	Dagenham (5)	2–1	Cambridge United	16 November 1985
36	Fareham Town (6)	0–3	Maidstone United (5)	16 November 1985
37	Swansea City	2–0	Leyton-Wingate (7)	16 November 1985
38	Farnborough Town (6)	0–4	Bath City (5)	16 November 1985
39	Frickley Athletic (5)	1–1	Halesowen Town (8)	16 November 1985
Replay	Halesowen Town	1–3	Frickley Athletic	19 November 1985
40	VS Rugby (7)	2–2	Orient	16 November 1985
Replay	Orient	4–1	VS Rugby	19 November 1985

== Second round proper ==
The second round of games were played over 7–9 December 1985, with replays being played on the 10th. Whitby Town from the Northern League (Step 8) was again the lowest-ranked team in the draw.

Tie no	Home team	Score	Away team	Date
1	Blackpool	1–2	Altrincham (5)	7 December 1985
2	AFC Bournemouth	4–1	Dagenham (5)	7 December 1985
3	Bristol City	1–2	Exeter City	7 December 1985
4	Reading	2–0	Hereford United	7 December 1985
5	Gillingham	6–1	Bognor Regis Town (6)	7 December 1985
6	Notts County	2–2	Wrexham	7 December 1985
Replay	Wrexham	0–3	Notts County	10 December 1985
7	Derby County	6–1	Telford United (5)	9 December 1985
8	Tranmere Rovers	1–1	Bury	7 December 1985
Replay	Bury	2–1	Tranmere Rovers	10 December 1985
9	Wycombe Wanderers (5)	2–0	Chelmsford City (6)	7 December 1985
10	Plymouth Argyle	3–0	Maidstone United (5)	7 December 1985
11	Scunthorpe United	2–2	Rochdale	7 December 1985
Replay	Rochdale	2–1	Scunthorpe United	10 December 1985
12	Port Vale	0–0	Walsall	8 December 1985
Replay	Walsall	2–1	Port Vale	10 December 1985
13	Newport County	1–1	Torquay United	7 December 1985
Replay	Torquay United	2–3	Newport County	10 December 1985
14	Runcorn (5)	1–1	Wigan Athletic	7 December 1985
Replay	Wigan Athletic	4–0	Runcorn	10 December 1985
15	York City	3–1	Whitby Town (8)	7 December 1985
16	Rotherham United	4–1	Burnley	7 December 1985
17	Peterborough United	1–0	Bath City (5)	7 December 1985
18	Orient	2–2	Slough Town (6)	7 December 1985
Replay	Slough Town	2–3	Orient	10 December 1985
19	Swansea City	1–2	Bristol Rovers	7 December 1985
20	Hartlepool United	0–1	Frickley Athletic (5)	7 December 1985

== Third round proper ==
Teams from the Football League First and Second Divisions entered in this round. Most of the third round of games in the FA Cup were played over the weekend 4–6 January 1986, however various matches and replays were played as late as 16 January. Wycombe Wanderers, Altrincham and Frickley Athletic from the Alliance Premier League at Step 5 of English football were the lowest-ranked teams in the round.

Tie no	Home team	Score	Away team	Date
1	Bury (3)	2–0	Barnsley (2)	13 January 1986
2	Liverpool (1)	5–0	Norwich City (2)	4 January 1986
3	Walsall (3)	1–3	Manchester City (1)	4 January 1986
4	Gillingham (3)	1–1	Derby County (3)	4 January 1986
Replay	Derby County	3–1	Gillingham	13 January 1986
5	Nottingham Forest (1)	1–1	Blackburn Rovers (2)	4 January 1986
Replay	Blackburn Rovers	3–2	Nottingham Forest	13 January 1986
6	Sheffield Wednesday (1)	2–2	West Bromwich Albion (1)	13 January 1986
Replay	West Bromwich Albion	2–3	Sheffield Wednesday	16 January 1986
7	Grimsby Town (2)	3–4	Arsenal (1)	4 January 1986
8	Middlesbrough (2)	1–3	Southampton (1)	13 January 1986
9	Sunderland (2)	2–0	Newport County (3)	4 January 1986
10	Everton (1)	1–0	Exeter City (4)	5 January 1986
11	Shrewsbury Town (2)	0–1	Chelsea (1)	4 January 1986
12	Sheffield United (2)	2–0	Fulham (2)	13 January 1986
13	Ipswich Town (1)	4–4	Bradford City (2)	4 January 1986
Replay	Bradford City	0–1	Ipswich Town	13 January 1986
14	Newcastle United (1)	0–2	Brighton & Hove Albion (2)	4 January 1986
15	Bristol Rovers (3)	3–1	Leicester City (1)	4 January 1986
16	Coventry City (1)	1–3	Watford (1)	4 January 1986
17	Portsmouth (2)	2–2	Aston Villa (1)	4 January 1986
Replay	Aston Villa	3–2	Portsmouth	13 January 1986
18	Manchester United (1)	2–0	Rochdale (4)	9 January 1986
19	Millwall (2)	3–1	Wimbledon (2)	4 January 1986
20	Hull City (2)	2–2	Plymouth Argyle (3)	4 January 1986
Replay	Plymouth Argyle	0–1	Hull City	7 January 1986
21	Carlisle United (2)	1–0	Queens Park Rangers (1)	13 January 1986
22	Oldham Athletic (2)	1–2	Orient (4)	6 January 1986
23	Crystal Palace (2)	1–2	Luton Town (1)	6 January 1986
24	Huddersfield Town (2)	0–0	Reading (3)	4 January 1986
Replay	Reading	2–1	Huddersfield Town	13 January 1986
25	Charlton Athletic (2)	0–1	West Ham United (1)	5 January 1986
26	York City (3)	2–0	Wycombe Wanderers (5)	4 January 1986
27	Stoke City (2)	0–2	Notts County (3)	13 January 1986
28	Wigan Athletic (3)	3–0	AFC Bournemouth (3)	4 January 1986
29	Peterborough United (4)	1–0	Leeds United (2)	4 January 1986
30	Birmingham City (1)	1–2	Altrincham (5)	14 January 1986
31	Oxford United (1)	1–1	Tottenham Hotspur (1)	4 January 1986
Replay	Tottenham Hotspur	2–1	Oxford United	8 January 1986
32	Frickley Athletic (5)	1–3	Rotherham United (3)	4 January 1986

== Fourth round proper ==
The fourth round of games were played over the weekend 25–26 January 1986. Replays took place on 28–29 January, or 3–6 February. Altrincham was the lowest-ranked team in the draw and the last non-league club left in the competition.

Tie no	Home team	Score	Away team	Date
1	Southampton	3–0	Wigan Athletic	25 January 1986
2	Reading	1–1	Bury	25 January 1986
Replay	Bury	3–0	Reading	28 January 1986
3	Notts County	1–1	Tottenham Hotspur	25 January 1986
Replay	Tottenham Hotspur	5–0	Notts County	29 January 1986
4	Aston Villa	1–1	Millwall	25 January 1986
Replay	Millwall	1–0	Aston Villa	29 January 1986
5	Sheffield Wednesday	5–0	Orient	25 January 1986
6	Sunderland	1–1	Manchester United	25 January 1986
Replay	Manchester United	3–0	Sunderland	29 January 1986
7	Luton Town	4–0	Bristol Rovers	25 January 1986
8	Everton	3–1	Blackburn Rovers	25 January 1986
9	Sheffield United	0–1	Derby County	25 January 1986
10	Manchester City	1–1	Watford	25 January 1986
Replay	Watford	0–0	Manchester City	3 February 1986
Replay	Manchester City	1–3	Watford	6 February 1986
11	West Ham United	0–0	Ipswich Town	25 January 1986
Replay	Ipswich Town	1–1	West Ham United	4 February 1986
Replay	Ipswich Town	0–1	West Ham United	6 February 1986
12	Hull City	2–3	Brighton & Hove Albion	25 January 1986
13	Chelsea	1–2	Liverpool	26 January 1986
14	Arsenal	5–1	Rotherham United	25 January 1986
15	York City	2–0	Altrincham (5)	25 January 1986
16	Peterborough United	1–0	Carlisle United	25 January 1986

== Fifth round proper ==
The fifth round of games were intended to be played on 15 February 1986, but, due to bad weather and an amazing 8 replays over the 8 ties, some of the ties were not determined until just under a month later. Holders Manchester United were eliminated by West Ham United. Fourth Division side Peterborough United was the lowest-ranked team in the round.

Tie no	Home team	Score	Away team	Date
1	Southampton	0–0	Millwall	15 February 1986
Replay	Millwall	0–1	Southampton	5 March 1986
2	Watford	1–1	Bury	5 March 1986
Replay	Bury	0–3	Watford	8 March 1986
3	Derby County	1–1	Sheffield Wednesday	26 February 1986
Replay	Sheffield Wednesday	2–0	Derby County	5 March 1986
4	Luton Town	2–2	Arsenal	15 February 1986
Replay	Arsenal	0–0	Luton Town	3 March 1986
Replay	Luton Town	3–0	Arsenal	5 March 1986
5	Tottenham Hotspur	1–2	Everton	4 March 1986
6	West Ham United	1–1	Manchester United	5 March 1986
Replay	Manchester United	0–2	West Ham United	9 March 1986
7	York City	1–1	Liverpool	15 February 1986
Replay	Liverpool	3–1	York City	18 February 1986
8	Peterborough United	2–2	Brighton & Hove Albion	15 February 1986
Replay	Brighton & Hove Albion	1–0	Peterborough United	3 March 1986

== Sixth round proper ==
The sixth round of FA Cup games were played either at the weekend on 8 March or midweek on 11–12 March 1986. Replays were played in the following midweek fixture.

8 March 1986

Luton Town	2–2	Everton
Harford 22'; M. Stein 63'		Sharp 65'; Heath 77'

Kenilworth Road, Luton
Attendance: 15,529
Referee: Keith Hackett (Sheffield)

8 March 1986

Brighton & Hove Albion	0–2	Southampton
		Moran; Cockerill

Goldstone Ground, Brighton and Hove
Referee: Neil Midgley (Salford)

11 March 1986

Liverpool	0–0	Watford

Anfield, Liverpool
Attendance: 36,775
Referee: Roger Milford (Bristol)

12 March 1986

Sheffield Wednesday	2–1	West Ham United
Worthington; Shutt		Cottee

Hillsborough Stadium, Sheffield
Referee: Joe Worrall (Warrington)

=== Replays ===
12 March 1986

Everton	1–0	Luton Town
Lineker 16'

Goodison Park, Liverpool
Attendance: 44,264
Referee: Keith Hackett (Sheffield)

17 March 1986

Watford	1–2 (a.e.t.)	Liverpool
Barnes 47'		Mølby 86' (pen.); Rush 108'

Vicarage Road, Watford
Attendance: 28,097
Referee: Roger Milford

== Semi-finals ==
Everton reached their third consecutive FA Cup final.

5 April 1986

Liverpool	2–0 (a.e.t.)	Southampton
Rush 99', 104'	Report

White Hart Lane, London
Attendance: 44,605
Referee: Alan Saunders (Newcastle)

5 April 1986

Everton	2–1 (a.e.t.)	Sheffield Wednesday
Harper 50'; Sharp 98'	Report	Shutt 53'

Villa Park, Birmingham
Attendance: 47,711
Referee: Brian Hill (Kettering)

== Broadcast coverage ==
The BBC and ITV continued to alternate between live and highlights coverage from the 3rd round onwards.

Round 3: Charlton Athletic 0–1 West Ham United (Live, BBC). The Big Match (ITV) showed highlights of Grimsby Town 3–4 Arsenal and Portsmouth 2–2 Aston Villa. The third round marked the return of English football to British television following a rights dispute.

Round 4: Chelsea 1–2 Liverpool (Live, ITV). Match of the Day (BBC) showed highlights of Sunderland 0–0 Manchester United, Notts County 1–1 Tottenham Hotspur and Manchester City 1–1 Watford.

Round 5: The fifth round weekend was heavily disrupted by bad weather and the live game that was to be shown by the BBC was postponed. The Big Match (ITV) showed highlights of York City 1–1 Liverpool, Southampton 0–0 Millwall and Luton Town 2–2 Arsenal.

Round 5 Replay: Manchester United 0–2 West Ham United (Live, ITV). Such were the disruptions to the fifth round schedule this replay was staged on the Sunday of the weekend originally meant for the quarter finals. ITV opted to show this match live rather than a quarter final.

Round 6: As stated above, no quarter final was shown live by ITV. Match of the Day (BBC) showed highlights of Brighton & Hove Albion 0–2 Southampton and Luton Town 2–2 Everton. The following midweek, highlights were shown of Liverpool 0–0 Watford (ITV) and Sheffield Wednesday 2–1 West Ham United (Sportsnight, BBC).

Semi Finals: Liverpool 2–0 Southampton aet (Highlights, The Big Match, ITV). Everton 2–1 Sheffield Wednesday aet (Highlights, Match of the Day, BBC)

Final: Everton 1–3 Liverpool (Live, BBC and ITV shared)

== Final ==
10 May 1986
15:00 BST

Liverpool	3–1	Everton
Rush 56', 83'; Johnston 62'		Lineker 27'

Wembley Stadium, London
Attendance: 98,000
Referee: Alan Robinson (Waterlooville)

Liverpool	Everton
