= Don Howe =

English footballer, coach, manager, and pundit

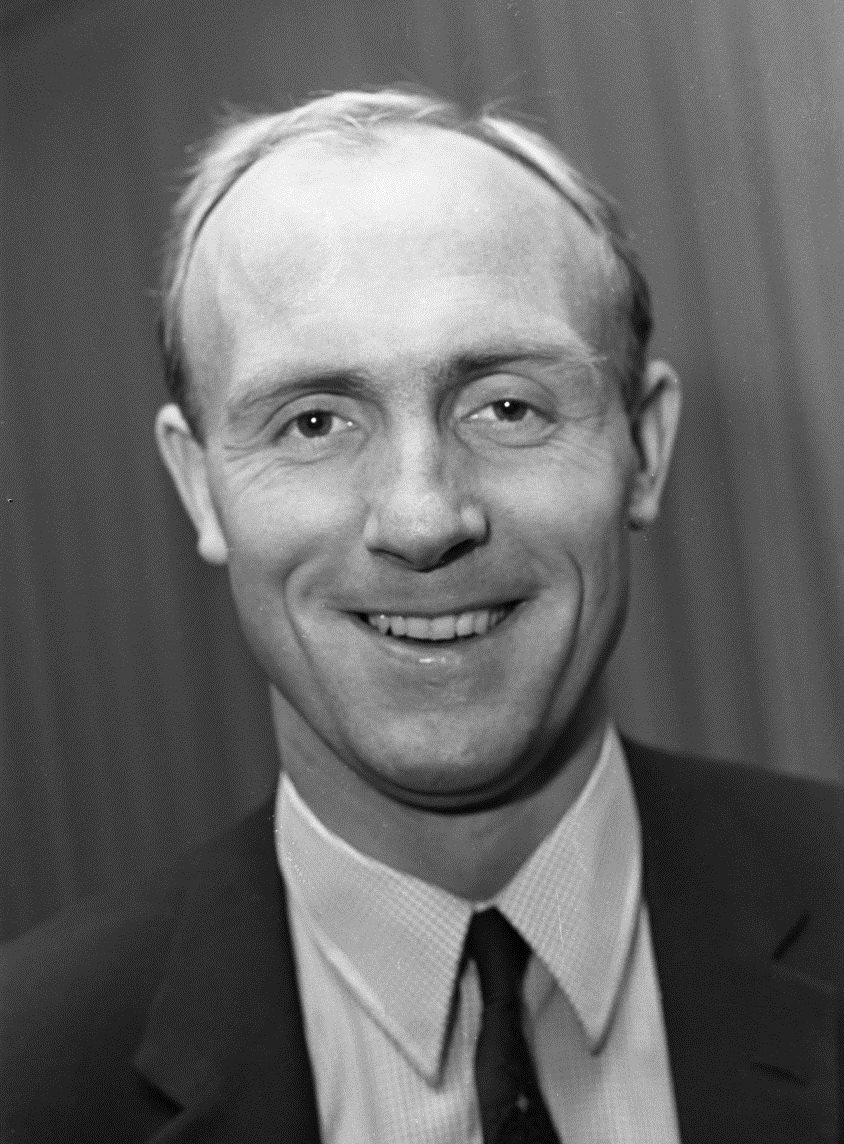
- Don Howe in 1967

Personal information
- Full name: Donald Howe
- Date of birth: 12 October 1935
- Place of birth: Springfield, Wolverhampton, England
- Date of death: 23 December 2015 (aged 80)
- Position: Right back

Senior career*
Years	Team	Apps	(Gls)
1952–1964	West Bromwich Albion	342	(17)
1964–1966	Arsenal	70	(1)
Total		412	(18)

International career
1957–1959	England	23	(0)

Managerial career
- 1971–1975: West Bromwich Albion
- 1975–1976: Galatasaray SK
- 1983–1986: Arsenal
- 1989–1991: Queens Park Rangers
- 1992: Coventry City
- * Club domestic league appearances and goals

Donald Howe (12 October 1935 – 23 December 2015) was an English football player, coach, manager and pundit. As a right back Howe featured for clubs West Bromwich Albion and Arsenal together with the England national football team in his playing career. He also went on to manage sides West Brom, Arsenal, Galatasaray, Queens Park Rangers and Coventry City. Howe was also a successful coach and has been described as one of the most influential figures of the English footballing game.

== Playing career ==
Howe was born in the Springfield area of Wolverhampton in 1935 and spent his secondary education at St Peter's Collegiate School.

Howe joined the West Bromwich Albion ground staff after leaving school, joining the club as a youth player in December 1950. He turned professional in November 1952, but did not make his debut until 1955, against Everton. In all he played 379 league and cup games scoring 19 goals for WBA in twelve years. In December 1963, while WBA captain, he was involved in a players' strike.

Howe was signed by Billy Wright's Arsenal in 1964, and was made club captain. However, in March 1966 he broke his leg playing against Blackpool and only played two further first team games both in September 1966. Firstly against Manchester City in the League on the 10th and then on the 13th against Gillingham in the League Cup. Howe made 70 appearances for Arsenal altogether.

In 2004, he was named as one of West Bromwich Albion's 16 greatest players, in a poll organised as part of the club's 125th anniversary celebrations.

== Coaching career ==
Howe retired from playing and became Arsenal's reserve team coach under Bertie Mee, then stepping up to first team coach after the departure of Dave Sexton in October 1967. Arsenal won the Double in 1971 with Howe playing a crucial role.

Not long afterward he returned to his old club, West Bromwich Albion, as manager. Howe's tenure at WBA was not a success, as the club were relegated to Division Two in 1973. Howe then joined Leeds United as a coach, later becoming assistant manager under Jimmy Armfield, before moving on to manage Turkish club Galatasaray in 1975. Howe rejoined Arsenal in 1977 as head coach, under Terry Neill.

After Neill's sacking on 16 December 1983, Howe became Arsenal caretaker-manager and was appointed permanently after the game against Leicester City on 28 April 1984. Despite introducing young players including Tony Adams, David Rocastle and Niall Quinn to the team during the mid-1980s, he was unable to win trophies, as Arsenal finished either 6th or 7th under him, although they did briefly top the league in October 1984.

After just over two years in the job, Howe resigned on 22 March 1986, shortly after Arsenal's match against Coventry City. George Graham succeeded him. This was subsequent to circulated reports that the board were looking at the time at FC Barcelona manager Terry Venables.

Howe later joined Wimbledon as assistant to Bobby Gould in 1987, and helped them win the FA Cup with a shock win over Liverpool in 1988. His coaching expertise earned him a great deal of credit for Wimbledon's cup triumph.

Howe then left Wimbledon to manage QPR between November 1989 and May 1991, with Gould briefly assisting him in the first half of the 1990–91 season.

In early 1992, Howe assisted Barry Fry with defensive work at Barnet.

Shortly after leaving QPR, he became assistant manager to Terry Butcher at Coventry City and became manager in January 1992 when Butcher was sacked. Howe secured a place in the new FA Premier League for Coventry, who missed relegation by one place, and just after the end of the 1991–92 season Gould rejoined him as joint manager of the Highfield Road club. However, Howe resigned as manager before the 1992–93 season began. He returned to Arsenal in 1997 as part of the Academy setup wherein as the head youth coach.

Howe also moved into journalism and broadcasting, becoming a pundit for Channel 4's coverage of Serie A.

== International career ==
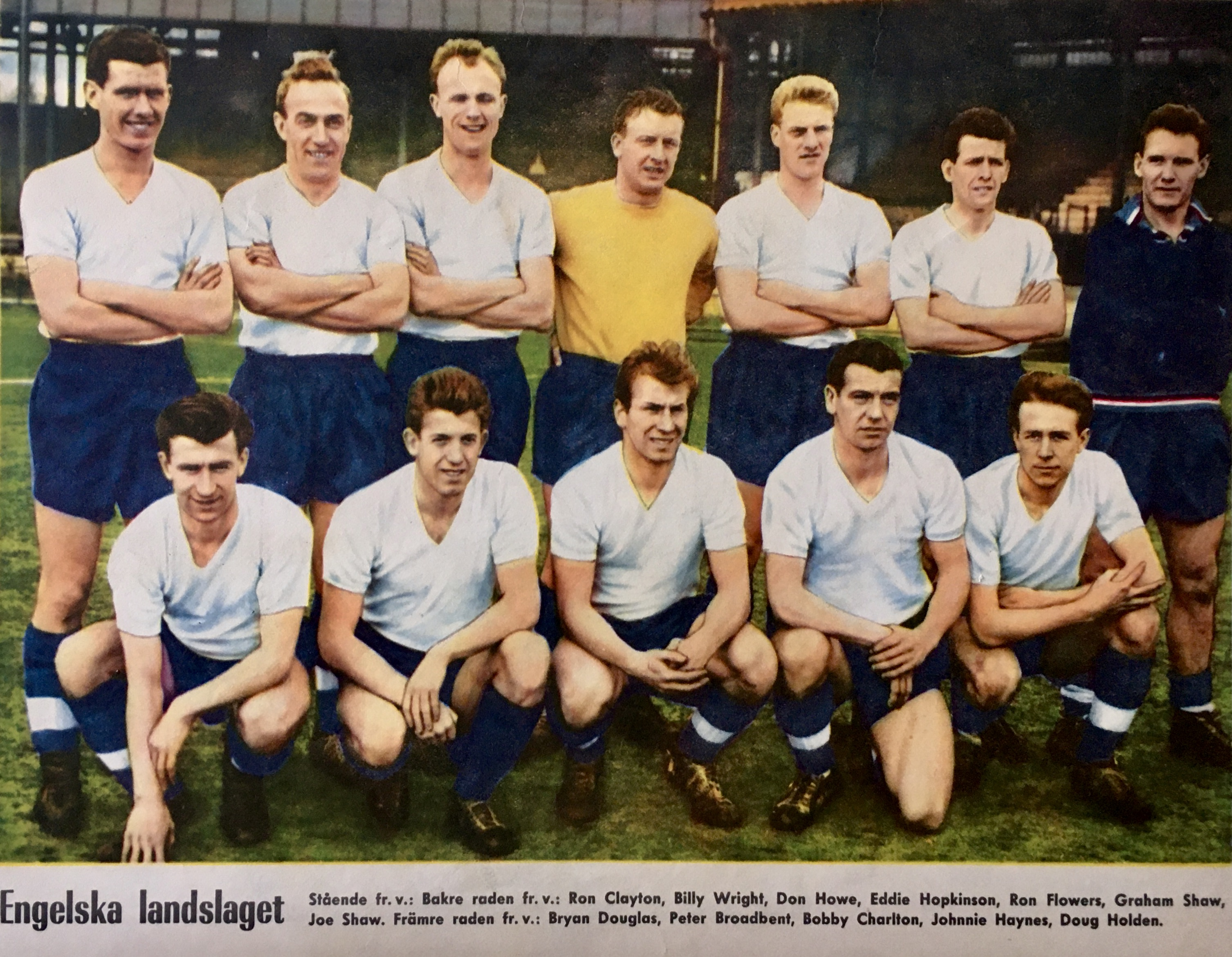
England national football team at Empire Stadium, London 11 April 1959. From the left, standing: Ronnie Clayton, Billy Wright (captain), Don Howe, Eddie Hopkinson, Ron Flowers, Graham Shaw, Joe Shaw; front row: Bryan Douglas, Peter Broadbent, Bobby Charlton, Johnny Haynes and Doug Holden

As a defender, he featured regularly in the England national football team. Howe played in the 1958 FIFA World Cup, and won 23 caps.

He became part of the England national team's coaching setup in 1981, working under Ron Greenwood. When Greenwood retired a year later, Howe continued to work for the national team under new manager Bobby Robson.

Howe became assistant for England under Terry Venables from January 1994 to June 1996, finishing with England's semi final appearance as host nation at Euro 96.

== Retirement ==
Howe retired from coaching in the summer of 2003 after more than 30 years. He though still ran youth coaching schemes across the United Kingdom. He occasionally wrote as a pundit for the BBC Sport website. He also held a regular column in the official Arsenal magazine.

Towards the end of 2007 and the beginning of 2008, he worked with the Football Association of Ireland (FAI) as part of a three-man panel to appoint Giovanni Trapattoni as the new national team manager.

== Death ==
Howe died, aged 80, in December 2015.

== Honours ==
=== Player ===
==== Club ====
West Bromwich Albion

- FA Cup: 1953-54
- FA Charity Shield: 1954

==== England ====
- British Home Championship: 1958, 1959, 1960

=== Assistant Manager ===
Arsenal

- Inter Cities Fairs Cup: 1970
- First Division: 1970–71
- FA Cup: 1970–71

Wimbledon

- FA Cup: 1987–88

=== Manager ===
Arsenal

- FA Cup: 1978–79
- FA Youth Cup: 2000
- FA Youth Cup: 2001

=== Individual ===
- LMA Special Merit Award: 2004
- FA Licensed Coaches Club Hall of Fame: 2013
