= 1958–59 Queens Park Rangers F.C. season =

English football club season

Queens Park Rangers
1958–59 season
- Chairman: Albert Hittinger
- Manager: Jack Taylor (resigns May 18th ), Alec Stock From June '59
- Stadium: Loftus Road
- Football League Third Division: 13th
- FA Cup: Third Round
- Southern Professional Floodlight Cup: Round One
- London Challenge Cup: Semi-Finals
- Top goalscorer: League: Arthur Longbottom 20; All: Arthur Longbottom 20
- Highest home attendance: 15,768 v Plymouth (27 December 1958)
- Lowest home attendance: 5,007 v Mansfield (21 February 1959)
- Biggest win: 5–0 v Wrexham (4 April 1959)
- Biggest defeat: 1–5 v Norwich (31 January 1959)
Home colours	Away colours	Third colours

The 1958-59 Queens Park Rangers season was the club's 68th season of existence and their 7th back in the restructured Football League Third Division following their relegation in the 1951–52 season. QPR finished 13th in their league campaign, and were eliminated in the third round of the FA Cup. On 18 May 1959, manager Jack Taylor resigned from his role at the club to become the manager of Leeds United F.C., Alec Stock was appointed as the new manager of QPR in June 1959.

== League standings ==
Pos	Team	Pld	W	D	L	GF	GA	GAv	Pts
11	Bradford City	46	18	11	17	84	76	1.105	47
12	Bournemouth & Boscombe Athletic	46	17	12	17	69	69	1.000	46
13	Queens Park Rangers	46	19	8	19	74	77	0.961	46
14	Southampton	46	17	11	18	88	80	1.100	45
15	Swindon Town	46	16	13	17	59	57	1.035	45

== Results ==
QPR scores given first

Win Draw Loss

=== Third Division ===
Date	Opponent	H / A	Result F–A	Scorers	Attendance	Position
23 August 1958	Reading (-)	A	2–2	Longbottom 2	16961	10
25 August 1958	Tranmere (4)	H	1–1	Cameron	12393	8
30 August 1958	Colchester (11)	H	4–2	Longbottom, Locke, Kerrins 2	9852	6
1 September 1958	Tranmere (11)	A	0–2		13959	11
6 September 1958	Bournemouth & Boscombe Ath. (9)	A	0–2		11890	18
9 September 1958	Doncaster Rovers	A	0–2		10725	19
13 September 1958	Norwich City (4)	H	2–1	Longbottom, Kerrins	10498	19
15 September 1958	Doncaster Rovers	A	3–1	Cameron, Kerrins, Longbottom	10118	13
20 September 1958	Southend United (11)	A	0–4		13524	20
22 September 1958	Stockport	A	3–2	Longbottom 3	12162	13
27 September 1958	Bury	H	2–1	Tomkys 2	10118	11
29 September 1958	Stockport	H	0–0		7458	10
4 October 1958	Mansfield Town (12)	A	4–3	Longbottom, Dawson, Cameron, Angell	10033	8
7 October 1958	Rochdale	A	2–2	Cameron, Tomkys	4276	9
11 October 1958	Chesterfield	H	2–2	Kerrins, Tomkys	9452	8
18 October 1958	Newport County	A	pp			
20 October 1958	Newport County (18)	A	1–3	Cameron	8410	11
25 October 1958	Halifax Town (14)	H	3–1	Longbottom 3	9607	8
1 November 1958	Accrington Stanley	A	4–2	Longbottom, Dawson 2, Tomkys	6498	6
8 November 1958	Southampton (6)	H	2–2	Longbottom, Petchey	11287	7
22 November 1958	Brentford (11)	H	1–2	Kerrins	15123	9
29 November 1958	Hull City (2)	A	0–1		11705	11
13 December 1958	Swindon	A	0–2		8307	15
20 December 1958	Reading (6)	H	2–0	Kerrins, Pearson	6909	12
26 December 1958	Plymouth (1)	A	2–3	Angell, Tomkys	30665	14
27 December 1958	Plymouth (1)	H	2–1	Pearson, Longbottom	15768	13
3 January 1959	Colchester (7)	A	0–3		8719	14
10 January 1959	Wrexham	A	pp			
17 January 1959	Bournemouth & Boscombe Ath. (11)	H	0–4		6041	16
24 January 1959	Bradford City	A	PP			
31 January 1959	Norwich City (19)	A	1–5	Longbottom	16781	18
7 February 1959	Southend United (3)	H	1–3	Petchey	6361	20
14 February 1959	Bury	A	1–3	Clark	5072	20
21 February 1959	Mansfield Town (18)	H	1–1	Locke	5007	20
28 February 1959	Chesterfield	A	3–2	Tomkys, Locke 2	8711	20
7 March 1959	Newport County (19)	H	4–2	Longbottom 2, Locke, Angell	5707	19
14 March 1959	Halifax Town (11)	A	1–2	Locke	5586	20
16 March 1959	Bradford City (17)	H	3–0	Whitelaw, Pearson 2	7578	16
21 March 1959	Accrington Stanley	H	3–1	Anderson, Pearson, Tighe (og)	8005	14
27 March 1959	Notts County (23)	H	2–1	Whitelaw, Pearson	12044	12
28 March 1959	Southampton (10)	A	0–1		9808	15
30 March 1959	Notts County (13)	A	1–0	Angell (pen)	6956	12
4 April 1959	Wrexham	H	5–0	Anderson 2, Whitelaw, Angell (pen), Longbottom	8670	11
8 April 1959	Wrexham	A	0–1		5738	11
11 April 1959	Brentford (3)	A	0–1		15905	13
18 April 1959	Hull City (1)	H	1–1	Whitelaw	9325	14
20 April 1959	Rochdale	H	3–0	Angell, Longbottom, Whitelaw	7280	12
25 April 1959	Bradford City (11)	A	0–1		6895	16
27 April 1959	Swindon	H	2–1	Angell, Tomkys	7628	13

=== London Challenge Cup ===
Date	Round	Opponents	H / A	Result F–A	Scorers	Attendance
6 October 1958	First Round	Walthamstow	H	3–2		
20 October 1958	Quarter-Finals	Fulham	H	4–2		
3 November 1958	Semi final	Tottenham	A	0–7		

=== Southern Professional Floodlight Cup ===
Date	Round	Opponents	H / A	Result F–A	Scorers	Attendance
13 October 1958	First Round	Fulham	A	0–4		8497

=== FA Cup ===
Date	Round	Opponents	H / A	Result F–A	Scorers	Attendance
15 November 1958	First Round	Walsall (Fourth Division)	A	1–0	Dawson	15123
6 December 1958	Second Round	Southampton (Third Division)	H	0–1		13166

=== Friendlies ===
Date	Opponentts		Score	Scorer
16-Aug-58	Whites v Reds	Practice Match		
27-Oct-58	Queens Park Rangers v All Stars XI	Jack Taylor/Arthur Longbottom Testimonial		
24-Jan-59	Leyton Orient v Queens Park Rangers	Friendly		
2-May-59	Crystal Palace v Queens Park Rangers	Charlie Catlett Testimonial	1-2	Angell pen

== Squad ==
Position	Nationality	Name	League Appearances	League Goals	Cup Appearances	F.A.Cup Goals	Southern Professional Floodlight Cup Goals	Total Appearances	Total Goals
GK	(England)	Ray Drinkwater	43		3			46	
GK	(England)	Pat Welton	3					3	
DF	(England)	Tony Ingham	46		3			49	
DF	(England)	Keith Rutter	44		3			47	
DF	(England)	Pat Woods	44		3			47	
DF	(England)	Walter Colgan	1					1	
MF	(England)	Pat Kerrins	29	7	3			32	7
MF	(England)	Stuart Richardson	1					1	
MF	(England)	John Pearson	16	5				16	5
MF	(England)	Peter Angell	45	6	3			48	6
MF	(England)	Arthur Longbottom	41	20	3			44	20
MF	(Scotland)	Bobby Cameron	22	5	3			25	5
MF	(England)	George Petchey	46	2	3			49	2
MF	(Northern Ireland)	Mike Powell	4					4	
FW	(England)	Mike Tomkys	25	8	3			28	8
FW	(Scotland)	Lesley Locke	25	5				25	5
FW	(Northern Ireland)	Alec Dawson	25	4	3	1		28	5
FW	(Scotland)	Tommy Anderson	10	3				10	3
FW	(Northern Ireland)	Brian Kelly	6					6	
FW	(Scotland)	George Whitelaw	11	5				11	5
FW	(England)	Clive Clark	19	1				19	1

== Transfers In ==
Name	from	Date	Fee
Ken Blakeway		July ?1958	
Brian Kelly	Dover	July 1958	
Tony Bantock	Fulham	July ?1958	
Terry Robinson *	Northampton	July ?1958	
Clive Clark	Leeds United	September 1958	
Graham Hopkins *		September ?1958	
George Wright *		October ?1958	
Brian Kelly	Dover	November 1958	
Tommy Anderson	Bournemouth	November 1958	
John Hutchins	Sittingbourne	February 2, 1959	
George Whitelaw	Sunderland	March 12, 1959	£2,000
Jimmy Andrews	Leyton Orient	June 1959	
Joe Cini *	Hibernians (Mlt)	June 1959	
Keith Spence		June 23, 1959	

== Transfers Out ==
Name	from	Date	Fee	Date	Club	Fee
Bob Fry	Bath City	Aug 16,1957		July 1958	Bexleyheath & Welling	
Doug Orr	Hendon	June 1957		July 1958	Queens Park	
Eddie Smith	Colchester United	July 1957	£1,050	July 1958	Chelmsford City	
Cecil Andrews	Crystal Palace	June 1956		July 1958	Sittingbourne	
Albert Rhodes	Workshop Town	December 15, 1954		July 1958	Tonbridge	
Peter Lay	Nottingham	July 13, 1956		July 1958	King's Lynn	
Bill Temby	Rhyl	February 14, 1955		July 1958	Dover	
Cecil (Archie) Andrews	Crystal P	June 25, 1956		July 1958	Sittingbourne	
John Crabb *		May 9, 1957		July 1958	Fulham	
Terry Peacock	Hull	Aug 2,1956		July 1958	Sittingbourne	
Bill Finney	Birmingham	May 15, 1957		July 1958	Crewe	
Graham Hopkins *		September ?1958		October? 1958		
Tom Standley	Basildon	May 18, 1957		November 1958	Bournemouth	
George Wright *		October ?1958		November? 1958		
Ken Blakeway		July 1958		June? 1959		
Tony Bantock	Fulham	July 1958		June? 1959	Redhill	
