= Tottenham Hotspur F.C. Under-21s and Academy =

Tottenham Hotspur Academy
- Full name: Tottenham Hotspur Football Club
- Nickname: The Lilywhites
- Short name: Spurs
- Ground: Hotspur Way, Enfield, London, England
- Chairman: Peter Charrington (non-executive)
- Manager: Wayne Burnett (Under-21s); Jamie Carr (Under-18s); Simon Davies (Academy)
- League: Premier League 2 U18 Premier League
Home colours	Away colours

The Tottenham Hotspur Academy is the youth system of Tottenham Hotspur Football Club. The academy was created to train and develop players from the age of eight all the way through to the age of 23. Many of those who have progressed through Tottenham's academy have gone on to sign professional contracts and several have represented their country at full international level.

The reserves in recent times have been known as the Development Squad to reflect the purpose of producing players for the first team. They won one Premier Reserve League South title following the league's formation in 1999 and were runners-up in the inaugural U21 Premier League which took over from 2012, becoming the Professional Development League's Premier League 2 in 2016. In Premier League 2, matches were for the under-23's until the 2022–23 season, since when the competition has been limited to under-21's. The team won Premier League 2 in season 2023–24.

The under-18's take part in the U18 Premier League, also a part of the Professional Development League.

== Historical reserve team ==
Prior to the formation of the academy, the reserve team played in the Football Combination. This was founded as the London Combination and originally consisted of London-based first teams, with reserve teams taking over in 1919. From 1926, clubs outside of London were admitted and the name of the league changed to the Football Combination. Tottenham's reserves were winners in seasons 1919–20, 1921–22, 1925–26, 1952–53, 1955–56, 1956–57, 1961–62, 1963–64, 1965–66, 1966–67, 1967–68, 1970–71, 1971–72, 1978–79, 1979–80, 1986–87, 1987–88, 1988–89 and 1994–95.

In 1999 the FA Premier Reserve League was founded and Tottenham's reserve team moved to that competition, remaining until the end of the 2008–09 season. Tottenham reserves won the FA Premier Reserve League, southern division, in season 2005–06, the first season under the managership of Clive Allen. Home games at that time were played at Broadhall Way, the home ground of Stevenage Borough. From the 2007–08 season home matches were played at Leyton Orient's home ground, the Matchroom Stadium. The club announced on 12 June 2009 that for the 2009–10 season it would not be entering a team in the Reserve League. Instead the reserve players would be loaned out for first team experience, and if necessary friendly matches would be arranged as required during the season to test out players returning from injury.

After not participating in the Reserve League for three seasons the club agreed to play in the newly formed Barclays U21 Premiership League from season 2012–13. This became the Professional Development League's Premier League 2 in 2016. The reserves have been succeeded by the Development Squad, a more modern iteration reflecting the intention to take players from the academy and help them achieve their potential by becoming First Team players, either at Tottenham Hotspur or elsewhere.

== Historical youth team ==
In 1923, Tottenham entered into an arrangement which saw Tottenham youngsters turn out for Northfleet United in the Kent League and associated cup competitions. Northfleet were Kent League Cup winners in 1923–24, and Kent League Division 1 champions in 1925–26, during which they scored 172 goals in a 36 match season. They won the Kent Senior Cup for five successive seasons between 1923–24 and 1927–28.

Northfleet United joined the Southern League Eastern Section in 1927–28 but left in 1930 and rejoined the Kent League. In 1931, the arrangement between the clubs was upgraded to full nursery team status and this heralded a period during which they scored a minimum of 110 goals in league competition each season. Northfleet were Kent League Division 1 Championship and Kent League Cup double winners in 1931–32 and 1934–35, league champions in 1935–36, and double winners again in 1936–37 (completing a hat-trick as league champions). They were Kent Senior Cup winners in 1937–38, and Kent League Division 1 champions again in 1938–39.

With the outbreak of the Second World War, league competition ceased as did the nursery team arrangement.

Tottenham Hotspur's youth team, for players aged 18 and under and known as Tottenham's 'A' team, was entered into the Eastern Counties League in 1948. They won the League Cup in their first season and the league title and the East Anglian Cup in their second. In 1957–58 they again won both the league and East Anglian Cup and went on to win the League Cup the following season. They won three consecutive league titles in 1959–60, 1960–61 and 1961–62. During their time in the Eastern Counties League the team played at White Hart Lane, as well as at Hoddesdon Town's Lowfield Ground (1950–51), the Hoddesdon Sports Arena (1951–52) and Brookfields Lane in Cheshunt (1952–1963).

In 1963 they moved to the Metropolitan League, winning the League Cup in 1963–64, the League Cup and Professional Cup in 1964–65 and the league itself in 1966–67.

In 1969 the youth team moved to the South East Counties League, winning it in seasons 1969–70, 1970–71, 1972–73, 1978–79, 1980–81, the five seasons 1985–86 through to 1989–90, 1991–92, 1992–93 and 1994–95. The youth team also won the national FA Youth Cup in 1970, 1974 and 1990. The team first won the South East Counties League Cup in 1985 and followed this with victories in 1986, 1988, 1991 (jointly), 1992, 1993, 1996 and 1997.

The youth team's reserves, otherwise known as the juniors or colts and consisting primarily of younger players, also took part in the South East Counties League. The league was originally split into Senior League and Junior League but from season 1985–86 it was Division One for the youth team and Division Two for the juniors.

The FA Premier Youth League was formed in 1997 and expanded in 1998 to be renamed the FA Premier Academy League, and the youth team left the South East Counties League.

== The Academy ==
The Tottenham Hotspur Academy coaches young footballers from the ages of 8 to 18 involving approximately 150 young players, looked after by 30 full-time and part-time staff. The academy features a network of 35 scouts who are tasked with finding the best local, national and international talent. Those under 16, in the Youth Development phase, are coached or play in the evenings and the weekend whilst they are in full-time education. On reaching 16, the best players are offered a place in the U18s Academy on a full-time two-year Scholarship contract. This provides an academic programme alongside their football commitments. Players will usually progress through first and second years of the Professional Development phase whereupon, on completion, they will either be offered a professional contract or be released. Where a player is borderline or has been held back because of injury there is the option of offering a third year at the academy by exception.

The Academy has Category One status, awarded by the Premier League's Elite Player Performance Plan.

Notable players to come through the Tottenham Hotspur Academy include Harry Kane, Ledley King, Jake Livermore, Ryan Mason, Danny Rose, Andros Townsend, Kyle Walker-Peters and Harry Winks, all of whom have gone on to represent their country at international level.

In 2017 the newly retired and former Tottenham player Scott Parker was appointed in charge of the Under-18s. In July 2018, Parker left Tottenham to return to his last club, Fulham, serving as first-team coach, and was replaced at Tottenham by his assistant Matt Wells. Matt Taylor took over in 2019 after Wells joined Parker at Fulham, and was himself replaced by Stuart Lewis in July 2021. Lewis was promoted to first team academy transition coach in July 2025 and Jamie Carr was appointed Under-18 coach in the November.

Academy managers have included Colin Murphy, Peter Suddaby, John McDermott and Dean Rastrick. The position is currently held by Simon Davies, who moved from head of coaching methodology on 20 June 2023 following Rastrick's departure from the club.

== Development squad ==
Players who have progressed through the academy and have shown the potential to play at a higher level are offered professional contracts and will then join the Development Squad, the successor to the reserve team. The Development Squad may also be joined by Under-21 players signed from other clubs or who are free agents and have proved themselves in trials at the club. The purpose of the Development Squad is to produce new players for the First Team, though breaking into the senior squad is no easy feat for a young player. As well as playing in Under-21 games, players may be loaned out to other clubs in lower leagues or sometimes abroad to give them experience and to aid their development.

In July 2014, former Aston Villa and Middlesbrough defender Ugo Ehiogu was appointed Under-21 team coach following a period of part-time work within the academy. On 20 April 2017, Ehiogu went into cardiac arrest after collapsing at Tottenham's training ground and died the following day at the age of 44. Two months later, Tottenham announced that they had appointed former Dagenham & Redbridge manager Wayne Burnett as Ehiogu's successor. Burnett had the title of Under-23 head coach but, following changes to Premier League 2, is now the Under-21 head coach. The Under-21s won Premier League 2 in season 2023–24.

== Notable seasons ==
=== 2005–06 season ===
New manager Clive Allen led the reserve team to their first FA Premier Reserve League South title, staying top of the table from mid-December and losing just three times during the league season. In the Barclays Premiership Reserve League Play-Off, contested by the winners of the Southern and Northern Reserve League titles, Tottenham Reserves lost 2–0 to Manchester United Reserves at Old Trafford.

=== 2012–13 season ===
Tottenham Under-21s won Group 2 of the Barclays U21 Premiership League in the first half of the season which qualified them for the Elite Group, which they also won. This put them through to the end of the season knock-out competition where they progressed all the way to the final, eventually losing 3–2 to Manchester United Under-21s.

=== 2014-15 season ===
On 6 September 2014, Tottenham Under-18s won the Premier League Under-18s Champions Cup, a two-day event held at Tottenham's training centre. The team, managed by Kieran McKenna, defeated Everton 5-1 then qualified for the final with a 1-1 draw against Spain's Real Madrid. In the final, they triumphed with a 1-0 win over Portugal's Benfica.

=== 2022–23 season ===
In May 2023, Tottenham Hotspur Under-18s won the Under-18 Premier League Cup, adding to the Under-17 version won the previous month. Both teams were managed by Stuart Lewis.

=== 2023–24 season ===
The Under-21s, coached by Wayne Burnett, won Premier League 2. The team won their first ten games of the 2023-24 season (including their first seven League games), before losing an EFL Trophy game 1-3 away to the eventual trophy winners League One Peterborough United on 31 October 2023. They ultimately won their first eleven league games and went on to win the league phase of Premier League 2. This qualified them for the play-off section of the competition, where they won the Play-Off Final on 26 May.

In addition, the team finished as losing finalists in the Premier League Cup.

=== 2024–25 season ===
The Under-17s, coached by Stuart Lewis, again won the Under-17 Premier League Cup, winning for the second time in three years after making it three finals in four seasons.

== Honours ==
=== Domestic ===
- Premier League 2
  - Winners (1): 2023–24
- FA Premier Reserve League – South
  - Winners (1): 2006
- FA Youth Cup
  - Winners (3): 1970, 1974, 1990
- Barclays U21 Premiership League
  - Winners Group 2 (1): 2012–13
  - Winners Elite Group (1): 2012–13
  - Runners-up U21 Premiership League (1): 2012–13
- U18 Premier League Cup
  - Winners (1): 2023
- U17 Premier League Cup
  - Winners (2): 2023, 2025
- U16 Premier League Cup
  - Winners (1): 2026

=== European ===
- Eurofoot Tournament
  - Winners (2): 2007, 2011
- Premier League Champions Cup
  - Winners (1): 2014

=== International ===
- Lion City Cup
  - Winners (1): 2015

== Players ==
=== Under-21s ===
As of 22 October 2026

Note: Flags indicate national team as defined under FIFA eligibility rules; some limited exceptions apply. Players may hold more than one non-FIFA nationality.

No.	Pos.	Nation	Player
46	GK	ENG	Luca Gunter
48	DF	ENG	Alfie Dorrington
49	MF	JAM	Tyrese Hall
51	GK	ENG	Jacob Knightbridge
52	MF	ENG	Callum Olusesi
56	GK	IRL	Aaron Maguire
57	MF	ENG	Rio Kyerematen
58	FW	ENG	Ellis Lehane
60	MF	ENG	Dan Batty
61	DF	ENG	Luca Furnell-Gill
62	MF	ENG	Max McFadden
66	DF	ENG	Malachi Hardy
71	FW	NIR	George Feeney

No.	Pos.	Nation	Player
72	FW	GUY	Reiss Elliott-Parris
74	DF	ENG	Maeson King
75	GK	ENG	Carey Bloedorn
76	DF	ENG	James Rowswell
77	GK	ENG	Samual Archer
78	DF	IRL	Harry Byrne
80	MF	ENG	Cole Ramsey
81	DF	FIN	Maxwell Adedeji
82	FW	ENG	Elisha Sowunmi
84	DF	GER	Miracle Adewole
86	MF	ENG	Ronny Moncur
89	MF	ENG	Tye Hall
—	GK	ENG	Dylan Thompson

==== Out on loan ====
As of 31 August 2026

Note: Flags indicate national team as defined under FIFA eligibility rules; some limited exceptions apply. Players may hold more than one non-FIFA nationality.

No.	Pos.	Nation	Player
43	MF	NIR	Jamie Donley (at Luton Town until 30 June 2027)
50	MF	ENG	George Abbott (at Mansfield Town until 30 June 2027)
53	MF	ENG	Reiss-Alexander Russell-Denny (at Bristol Rovers until 30 June 2027)
55	FW	IRL	Mason Melia (at Lincoln City until 30 June 2027)

No.	Pos.	Nation	Player
63	FW	ENG	Damola Ajayi (at Barnet until 30 June 2027)
70	FW	MAR	Yusuf Akhamrich (at Leyton Orient until 30 June 2027)
73	FW	ENG	Oliver Irow (at Plymouth Argyle until 30 June 2027)

=== Under-18s ===
==== Second Year Academy Players ====
As of 7 August 2026

Note: Flags indicate national team as defined under FIFA eligibility rules; some limited exceptions apply. Players may hold more than one non-FIFA nationality.

No.	Pos.	Nation	Player
67	DF	ENG	Jun'ai Byfield (professional)
87	FW	ENG	Oliver Boast (professional)
88	DF	ENG	Tyler Tingey (professional)
93	GK	ENG	Farren Doran (professional)
—	GK	ENG	Blake Irow (professional)
—	DF	ENG	Ezra Agyekum

No.	Pos.	Nation	Player
—	DF	ENG	Cayon Hanson
—	MF	ALB	Armend Muslika (professional)
—	MF	ENG	Cameron Thomas
—	FW	SCO	Conall Glancy (professional)
—	FW	WAL	Oliver Salter
—	FW	ENG	Joel Vidal-Philbert

==== Out on loan ====
Note: Flags indicate national team as defined under FIFA eligibility rules; some limited exceptions apply. Players may hold more than one non-FIFA nationality.

No.	Pos.	Nation	Player

==== First Year Academy Players ====
As of 15 July 2026

Note: Flags indicate national team as defined under FIFA eligibility rules; some limited exceptions apply. Players may hold more than one non-FIFA nationality.

No.	Pos.	Nation	Player
—	GK	ENG	Max Sievey (professional)
—	DF	JAM	Oscar Dawes
—	DF	WAL	Ted Evans
—	DF	ENG	George Jobling
—	DF	NGR	Solomon Olajide (professional)
—	DF	ENG	Oscar Sandiford (professional)
—	MF	SCO	Zion Beckles

No.	Pos.	Nation	Player
—	MF	ESP	Courtney Coffi Smith
—	MF	NIR	Harry Hughes
—	MF	ENG	Kwasi Senyah
—	MF	ENG	Toju Wellspring
—	FW	FRA	Melvyn Kabongolo
—	FW	DOM	Blake Philogene-Bidace
—	FW	NGR	Phoenix Offiah

==== Out on loan ====
Note: Flags indicate national team as defined under FIFA eligibility rules; some limited exceptions apply. Players may hold more than one non-FIFA nationality.

No.	Pos.	Nation	Player

== Notable Tottenham Hotspur F.C. youth team players or Academy graduates ==
The following list of youth team players or Academy graduates appeared in a competitive first team fixture for Tottenham Hotspur and have been capped in a full international since the Second World War. Players still currently playing for the club are in bold. Other still active players are in italics.

- (England) Eddie Baily
- (England) Nick Barmby
- (Algeria) Nabil Bentaleb
- (Wales) Mark Bowen
- (Northern Ireland) Noel Brotherston
- (Wales) Ronnie Burgess
- (England) Sol Campbell
- (Republic of Ireland) Stephen Carr
- (United States) Cameron Carter-Vickers
- (Sierra Leone) Steven Caulker (also played for England)
- (England) Peter Crouch
- (England) Ted Ditchburn
- (Northern Ireland) **Jamie Donley**
- (Cyprus) Anthony Georgiou
- (Northern Ireland) Phil Gray
- (England) Ron Henry
- (England) Glenn Hoddle
- (Wales) Mel Hopkins
- (Republic of Ireland) Chris Hughton
- (England) Harry Kane
- (Republic of Ireland) Stephen Kelly
- (England) Ledley King
- (England) Jake Livermore
- (Australia) Massimo Luongo
- (England) Noni Madueke
- (England) Ryan Mason
- (Northern Ireland) Chris McGrath
- (Northern Ireland) Paul McVeigh
- (England) Bill Nicholson
- (Republic of Ireland) Troy Parrott
- (Estonia) Maksim Paskotši
- (England) Steve Perryman
- (England) Jamie Redknapp
- (Northern Ireland) Stephen Robinson
- (England) Danny Rose
- (Scotland) Graeme Souness
- (England) Andros Townsend
- (Serbia) Miloš Veljković
- (England) Ian Walker
- (England) Kyle Walker-Peters
- (England) Keith Weller
- (England) Harry Winks
- (England) Luke Young

The following list of youth team or Academy players have been capped in a full international since the Second World War but never played in a competitive first team game for Tottenham. Players still currently playing for the club are in bold. Other still active players are in italics.

- (New Zealand) Bobby Almond
- (Scotland) Jordan Archer
- (Sierra Leone) Kallum Cesay
- (Guyana) Sam Cox
- (Jamaica) Simon Dawkins
- (England) Kerry Dixon
- (South Africa) Quinton Fortune
- (Antigua and Barbuda) Zaine Francis-Angol
- (Saint Lucia) Warren Hackett
- (Jamaica) **Tyrese Hall**
- (Northern Ireland) Mark Hughes
- (Sweden) Oscar Jansson
- (Iraq) Yaser Kasim
- (Democratic Republic of the Congo) Paul-José M'Poku
- (Jamaica) Danny Maddix
- (Democratic Republic of the Congo) Christian Maghoma
- (Democratic Republic of the Congo) Jacques Maghoma
- (Republic of Ireland) **Mason Melia**
- (Malawi) Jubril Okedina
- (Czech Republic) Tomáš Pekhart
- (Jamaica) Ramil Sheriff
- (Jamaica) Kevin Stewart
- (Northern Ireland) Ciarán Toner
- (Nigeria) William Troost-Ekong

The following additional list of youth team players or Academy graduates although uncapped in a full international have appeared in 100 or more competitive fixtures for the Tottenham Hotspur first team since the Second World War. Players still currently playing for the club are in bold. Other still active players are in italics.

- (England) Phil Beal
- (England) Garry Brooke
- (England) Eddie Clayton
- (England) Stephen Clemence
- (England) Barry Daines
- (England) Ray Evans
- (England) Mark Falco
- (England) Tommy Harmer
- (England) Micky Hazard
- (England) David Howells
- (England) Chris Jones
- (England) Tony Marchi
- (England) Paul Miller
- (England) Jimmy Neighbour
- (England) Keith Osgood
- (England) Jimmy Pearce
- (England) John Pratt
- (England) Vinny Samways
- (England) Frank Saul
- (England) Oliver Skipp
- (England) Sonny Walters

== Academy management and support staff ==
Role	Name
Academy Director	Simon Davies
Head of loans and pathways	Andy Scoulding
Lead player development and methodology analyst	Alex Vinall
Under-21 head coach	Wayne Burnett
Under-21 assistant coach	Troy Archibald-Henville
Under-18 head coach	Jamie Carr
Under-18 assistant coach	Bradley Allen
Under-16 head coach	Tom Hart
Under-16 assistant coach	Tom Carroll
Head of academy goalkeeping	Sam Donkin
Goalkeeping coach under-7 to under-12	Aaron Tillbrook
Head of academy coaching	Joe Staunton
Academy coach and college head coach	Ryan Hall
Academy coach	Connor McEnroe
Academy coach	Tony Tillbrook
Head of academy sports science	Joshua Rice
Head of academy medical	Dave Appanah
Lead academy physical development coach	Adrian van der Ploeg
Academy fitness coach under-21	Joshua Rice
Academy fitness coach under-18	Chris Riley
Head of academy football development	Gary Broadhurst
Head coach, football development centre	Paul Griffiths
Head of global football development	Andy Rogers
Academy and global football development coach	Jamal Rose
Global development coach	Frankie Rogers
Head of academy recruitment	Jack Chapman
National scouting coordinator	Nathan Keogh
Academy scout	Jake Pearson
Academy scout	Ayo Olubanjo
Academy recruitment officer	Jason Hogg
Head of academy operations and administration	Tom Pell
Academy administration manager	Amy Ganderton
Academy head of education	Mark Sinclair
Academy education assistant	Helene Michaels
Academy player care manager	Stephen Quinn
Transport manager and welfare officer	Nick Boulli
Academy kit manager	Tavish Mahandru
Development/Academy kit assistant	Stanley White

== Manager history ==
=== Reserve team manager / Head of development ===
The role of Reserve Team Manager was often filled by the club's Assistant Manager.

- (England) Harry Lowe (Reserve Team Manager 1938–1939)

There was no reserve team during World War 2.

- (England) Leonard Thompson (Reserve team coach prior to 1947)
- (England) Bill Nicholson (Assistant Manager and coach 1955–1958)
- (England) Harry Evans (Assistant Manager and coach 1959–1962)
- (England) Eddie Baily (Assistant Manager 1963–1974)
- (England) Pat Welton (Reserve team manager 1974–1976)
- (Wales) Peter Shreeves (Reserve team manager 1977–1980)
- (England) Robin "Robbie" Stepney (Reserve team manager 1980–1984)
- (England) John Pratt (Reserve team manager / Assistant Manager 1984–1986)
- (England) Doug Livermore (Reserve team manager 1986–1991)
- (England) Pat Holland (Reserve team manager 1988(?)–1995)
- (England) Roger Cross (Reserve team manager / Assistant Manager 1995–1997)
- (Republic of Ireland) Chris Hughton (Reserve team manager 1997–1998)
- (Republic of Ireland) Theo Foley (First team coach / Reserve team manager 1998–2001)
- (Scotland) Colin Calderwood (Reserve team manager 2001–2003)
- (England) Clive Allen (Reserve team manager 2003–2004)
- (England) Clive Allen (Reserve team manager 2005–2009)

There was no reserve team 2009–2012.

- 2012–2016 ???
- (England) John McDermott (Head of coaching and development 2016–2020) ^{Note 1}
- (England) Wayne Burnett (Under-23 manager 2017–present)
- (England) Ryan Mason (Head of player development Under-17 to Under-23 2020–2021)

^{Note 1}McDermott was already Head of coaching and development but it was not until 2016 that he was put in charge of all teams below the first team, and was therefore the notional reserve team manager.

=== Under-18 manager / Youth team manager ===
Prior to 1969 Tottenham did not have a full-time youth team manager. Jimmy Anderson was in charge of the Northfleet nursery team from 1934 to 1939 and was arguably the Tottenham youth team manager in all but name.
Sometimes the Under-18 manager is referred to as the Under-18 coach.

- (England) Pat Welton (1969–1974)
- (Wales) Peter Shreeves (1974–1977)
- 1977–1983 ???
- (England) John Pratt (1983–1984)
- (England) Keith Blunt (1984–1987)
- (England) Keith Waldon (1987–1994)
- (Scotland) Des Bulpin (1994–1995)
- (England) Colin Reid (1995–1998)
- 1998–2006 ???
- (England) Pat Holland (2001)
- (England) Alex Inglethorpe (2006–2012)
- 2012–2015 ???
- (Northern Ireland) Kieran McKenna (2015–2016)
- (England) John McDermott (2016–2017)
- (England) Scott Parker (2017–2018)
- (England) Matt Wells (2018–2019)
- (England) John McDermott (2019)
- (England) Matt Taylor (2019–2021)
- (England) Stuart Lewis (2021–2025)
- (England) Joe Staunton (interim only, 2025)
- (Republic of Ireland) Jamie Carr (2025-present)

=== Academy manager / Academy director ===
The titles 'Academy manager' and 'Academy director' seem to be interchangeable.

- (England) Colin Murphy (1998–1999)
- (England) Peter Suddaby (1999–2005)
- (England) John McDermott (2005–2020)
- (England) Dean Rastrick (2020–2023)
- (Wales) Simon Davies (2023–present)
