= List of Portsmouth F.C. managers =

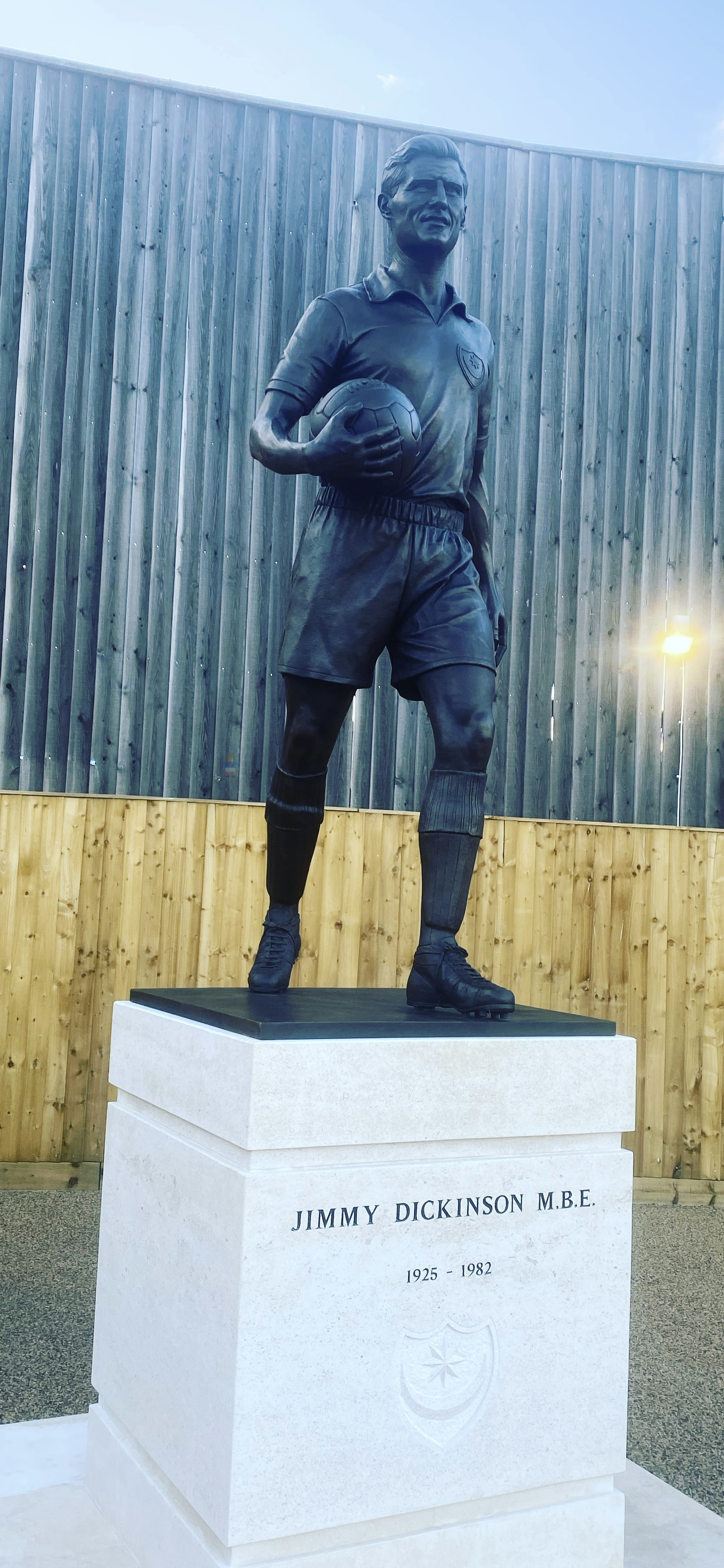
Statue of Jimmy Dickinson, player for Portsmouth from 1946 to 1965 and manager of Portsmouth 1977 to 1979, outside Fratton Park

Portsmouth Football Club is a professional football club based in Milton, Portsmouth, in Hampshire, England. The club was formed at 12 High Street, Old Portsmouth on 5 April 1898 as Portsmouth Football and Athletic Company and was elected to the Southern League Division 1 for the 1899-1900 season and finished runners-up in their first season.

Portsmouth Football Club have had 41 permanent managers and 10 caretaker managers in their history. The first manager was Frank Brettell who joined Portsmouth from Tottenham Hotspur in February 1899. The longest serving manager was Jack Tinn with 20 years from 1927 to 1947. The shortest serving permanent manager was Velimir Zajec at 4 months and 14 days. The most successful manager was Bob Jackson, winning two back to back First Division titles in 1948-49 and 1949-50 and a Charity Shield (shared) in 1949. Most recent success was with current manager John Mousinho, winning the League One title in 2024.

Bob Blyth, Ron Tindall, Jimmy Dickinson, Bobby Campbell, Guy Whittingham, and Andy Awford have all played for Portsmouth at one point and later would go on to manage the club as well. From 12 October 2000 to 25 February 2001 Steve Claridge was player-manager.

== Full Managers List and Statistics ==
Information and statistics correct as of 19 September 2026. Only competitive matches are counted.

Table headers

- Nationality – If the manager played international football as a player, the country/countries he played for are shown. Otherwise, the manager's nationality is given as their country of birth.
- From – The date of the start of the manager's tenure for Portsmouth.
- To – The date of the end of the manager's tenure for Portsmouth.
- P – The number of games managed for Portsmouth.
- W – The number of games won as a manager.
- D – The number of games drawn as a manager.
- L – The number of games lost as a manager.
- Win% – The total winning percentage under his management rounded to two decimal places.
- Honours – The trophies won while managing Portsmouth.

Key

- (n/a) = Information not available
- ^{p} = Player-manager

List of Portsmouth F.C. managers
Image	Name	Nationality	From	To	P	W	D	L	Win%	Honours	Ref
	Frank Brettell	England	February 1899	May 1901	88	56	9	23	63.64		
	Bob Blyth	Scotland	August 1901	May 1904	142	84	29	29	59.15		
	Richard Bonney	England	August 1904	May 1908	206	99	39	68	48.06		
	Robert Brown	England	August 1911	May 1920	220	100	48	72	45.45		
	John McCartney	Scotland	May 1920	May 1927	308	129	93	86	41.88	1 Third Division (tier 3) champions: 1923-24, 1 Second Division (tier 2) runners-up: 1926-27	
	Jack Tinn	England	May 1927	May 1947	586	229	131	226	39.08	1 FA Cup winners: 1938–39, 2 FA Cup runners-up: 1928–29, 1933–34	
	Bob Jackson	England	May 1947	June 1952	234	114	51	69	48.72	2 First Division (tier 1) champions: 1948-49, 1949-50, 1 Charity Shield (shared):1949	
	Eddie Lever	England	August 1952	April 1958	261	88	67	106	33.72		
	Freddie Cox	England	August 1958	February 1961	120	28	29	63	23.33		
	George Smith	England	April 1961	April 1970	430	157	112	161	36.51	1 Third Division (tier 3) champions: 1961-62	
	Ron Tindall	England	1 April 1970	10 May 1973	143	41	41	61	28.67		
	John Mortimore	England	10 May 1973	6 September 1974	54	18	16	20	33.33		
	Ian St. John	Scotland	13 September 1974	4 May 1977	138	35	38	65	25.36		
	Jimmy Dickinson	England	4 May 1977	1 May 1979	103	31	32	40	30.10		
	Frank Burrows	Scotland	1 May 1979	1 May 1982	159	67	47	45	42.14		
	Bobby Campbell	England	21 May 1982	11 May 1984	98	43	20	35	43.88	1 Third Division (tier 3) champions: 1982-83	
	Alan Ball	England	11 May 1984	17 January 1989	222	94	58	70	42.34	1 Second Division (tier 2) runners-up: 1986-87	
	John Gregory	England	17 January 1989	3 January 1990	50	10	15	25	20.00		
	Frank Burrows	Scotland	23 January 1990	13 March 1991	60	20	17	23	33.33		
	Jim Smith	England	1 June 1991	2 February 1995	200	82	54	64	41.00		
	Terry Fenwick	England	2 February 1995	13 January 1998	131	43	29	59	32.82		
	Alan Ball	England	26 January 1998	9 December 1999	97	28	26	43	28.87		
	Tony Pulis	Wales	13 January 2000	12 October 2000	35	11	10	14	31.43		
	Steve Claridge^{p}	England	12 October 2000	25 February 2001	23	5	10	8	21.74		
	Graham Rix	England	25 February 2001	25 March 2002	56	16	17	23	28.57		
	Harry Redknapp	England	25 March 2002	24 November 2004	116	54	26	36	46.55	1 First Division (tier 2) champions: 2002-03	
	Velimir Zajec	Croatia	24 November 2004	7 April 2005	21	5	4	12	23.81		
	Alain Perrin	France	7 April 2005	24 November 2005	21	4	6	11	19.05		
	Harry Redknapp	England	7 December 2005	25 October 2008	127	54	28	45	42.52	1 FA Cup winners: 2007–08, 1 FA Community Shield runners up: 2008	
	Tony Adams	England	25 October 2008	9 February 2009	22	4	7	11	18.18		
	Paul Hart	England	9 February 2009	24 November 2009	30	9	6	15	30.00		
	Avram Grant	Israel	26 November 2009	21 May 2010	33	10	7	16	30.30	1 FA Cup runners-up: 2009–10	
	Steve Cotterill	England	14 June 2010	14 October 2011	61	18	17	26	29.51		
	Michael Appleton	England	10 November 2011	7 November 2012	51	13	11	27	25.49		
	Guy Whittingham	England	7 November 2012	25 November 2013	51	11	15	25	21.57		
	Richie Barker	England	9 December 2013	27 March 2014	20	4	8	8	20.00		
	Andy Awford	England	27 March 2014	13 April 2015	55	20	17	18	36.36		
	Paul Cook	England	12 May 2015	31 May 2017	107	52	27	28	48.60	1 League Two (tier 4) champions: 2016-17	
	Kenny Jackett	Wales	2 June 2017	14 March 2021	211	107	44	60	50.71	1 EFL Trophy winners: 2018–19, 1 EFL Trophy runners-up: 2019–20	
	Danny Cowley	England	19 March 2021	2 January 2023	97	42	27	28	43.30		
	John Mousinho	England	20 January 2023	Present		75	51	59	40.11	1 League One (tier 3) champions: 2023-24	

=== Caretaker managers ===
Figures correct as of 20 January 2023
Includes all competitive matches.

Name	Nationality	From	To	P	W	D	L	Win %	Ref
Ron Tindall	England	6 September 1974	13 September 1974	2	0	0	2	0.00	
Tony Barton	England	March 1991	May 1991	12	5	2	5	41.67	
Keith Waldon	England	13 January 1998	26 January 1998	3	0	0	3	0.00	
Bob McNab	England	9 December 1999	13 January 2000	5	0	2	3	0.00	
Joe Jordan	Scotland	24 November 2005	7 December 2005	2	0	0	2	0.00	
Stuart Gray	England	October 2011	November 2011	6	3	1	2	50.00	
Andy Awford	England	25 November 2013	9 December 2013	3	0	2	1	0.00	
Gary Waddock	England	13 April 2015	12 May 2015	4	1	1	2	25.00	
Joe Gallen	England	14 March 2021	18 March 2021	1	0	0	1	0.00	
Simon Bassey	England	3 January 2023	20 January 2023	3	0	0	3	0.00	
