= Sporting Chance Clinic =

UK mental health organization

Sporting Chance
- Founded: 1 September 2000
- Founder: Tony Adams
- Location(s): Liphook, Hampshire and York, North Yorkshire
- Website: www.sportingchanceclinic.com

Sporting Chance (sometimes referred to by its original name, Sporting Chance Clinic) is a registered UK based charity.

Formed in September 2000 and set up by former Arsenal and England football captain Tony Adams, Sporting Chance provides support to current and former professional athletes for mental and emotional health problems and treatment of addictive disorders.

On 27 September 2013, it was announced that former CEO Peter Kay had died aged 52.

== Services ==
=== One-to-one therapy and triage ===
Sporting Chance offers access to a national network of therapists and counsellors, all are vetted as to their qualification, specialism, place of practice, that they are suitably insured, that they maintain personal supervision and of course, their geography. Sporting Chance’s diligence process mirrors that of the BACP (British Association of Counsellors and Psychotherapists) and the UKCP (United Kingdom Council for Psychotherapy). This service can be accessed through a stakeholder referral or directly via a 24-hour telephone line. This service delivers talking therapy and treatment solutions to a wide range of mental and emotional health presentations. Over a thousand current and retired professional athletes will use this service each year.

=== Residential treatment for addictive disorders ===
Sporting Chance provides the only residential treatment facility in the world for the treatment of addictive disorders exclusively working with professional athletes, based at Forest Mere Country Club near Liphook, Hampshire. The treatment models are suitable for those presenting alcohol, substance and gambling problems, which are considered symptoms of an addictive disorder. There are 3 treatment programs delivered over different time spans, these are 5, 12 and 26 days. All are fully residential and tailored to an athlete, providing facilities and activities to enable any athlete to maintain the level of physical fitness they require to compete. The system is based on the twelve-step program of Alcoholics Anonymous. The aim is to provide a safe environment where the addict can begin a new life free from the drug or behavior pattern that has been damaging them, their families and their sporting life. The philosophy is based on Adams's own experiences of his requirements as an athlete in his own recovery from alcoholism.

=== Education and training ===
The charity delivers education seminars and workshops to a range of audiences across sport, primarily the athletes themselves but also those who work directly with athletes and those who work for the leagues and governing bodies that run the sports in which the athletes take part. All content is tailored to the audience it serves taking into account the sport, the age group, audience members' roles within the sport and any potential learning blocks within the group. Subjects discussed include general mental health and wellbeing in a sporting context, transition, emotional resilience, the impact of social media, problematic gambling, illicit substance use and addiction.

== Patrons ==
The patrons include ex-Sports Minister Kate Hoey, former professional footballer Lee Dixon, Tony Smith, Irish Jockey Sir A.P McCoy, athlete Dame Kelly Holmes and musician Sir Elton John.

== Stakeholders ==
The clinic is supported by various sporting bodies and institutions including the Professional Footballers' Association, The Premier League, The Football Association, The Professional Cricketers' Association, Rugby League Cares, The Professional Jockeys Association.
