= Tony Adams =

English footballer (born 1966)

Tony Adams MBE
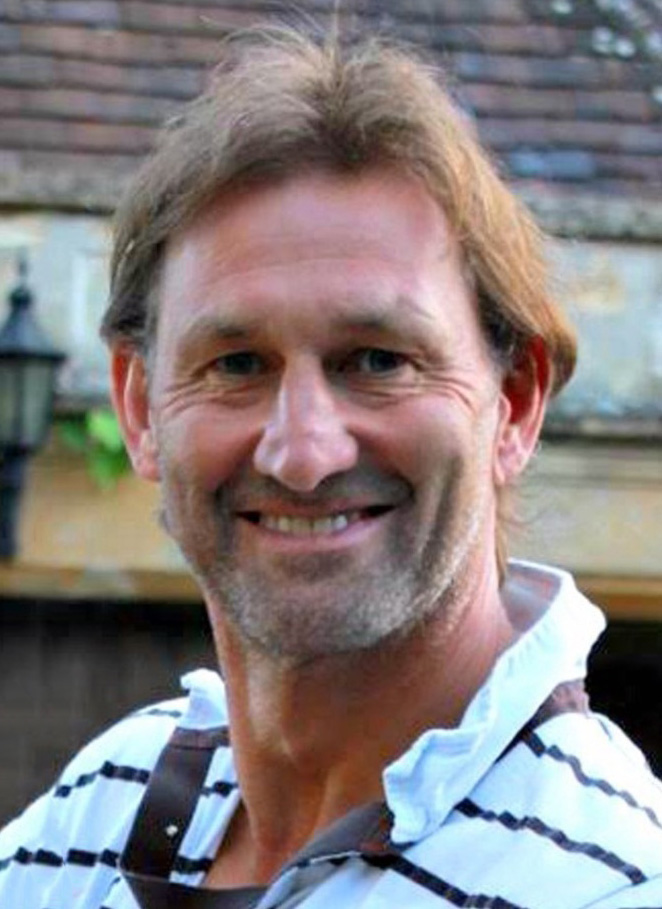
- Adams in 2017

Personal information
- Full name: Tony Alexander Adams
- Date of birth: 10 October 1966 (age 60)
- Place of birth: Romford, Greater London, England
- Height: 6 ft 3 in (1.91 m)
- Position: Centre-back

Youth career
- 1980–1983: Arsenal

Senior career*
Years	Team	Apps	(Gls)
1983–2002	Arsenal	504	(32)

International career
1983–1984	England U17	13	(5)
1985	England Youth	1	(0)
1985–1986	England U21	5	(1)
1989-1990	England B	4	(1)
1987–2000	England	66	(5)

Managerial career
- 2003–2004: Wycombe Wanderers
- 2008–2009: Portsmouth
- 2010–2011: Gabala
- 2017: Granada
- * Club domestic league appearances and goals

Tony Alexander Adams (born 10 October 1966) is an English former football player and manager. Adams played for Arsenal and England, captaining both. Known as "Mr. Arsenal", he spent his entire playing career of 19 years as a centre-back there, making 672 total appearances and winning four English league titles. He is considered one of Arsenal's greatest-ever players and is also included in the Football League 100 Legends.

With Arsenal, uniquely he captained a title-winning team in three different decades, won three FA Cups, two Football League Cups, a UEFA Cup Winners' Cup and two FA Community Shields. Adams is one of six people honoured with a statue outside the Emirates Stadium, Arsenal's home ground. He won 66 caps for England between 1987 and 2000 and played at four major tournaments.

When his playing career finished, Adams went into football management, spending periods in charge of Wycombe Wanderers, Portsmouth, Azerbaijani side Gabala and Spanish side Granada.

From early in his career Adams was an alcoholic. He was sentenced to four months in prison for driving while four times over the limit for blood alcohol, after crashing his car. From 1996 he recovered completely and became involved in helping sportspeople with drink, drug or gambling addictions by founding the Sporting Chance Clinic.

== Early life ==
Born in Romford, Greater London, Adams grew up in Dagenham and was a pupil at Hunters Hall Primary School from 1971 to 1978 and then Eastbrook Comprehensive School from 1978 to 1983. His cousin is fellow professional footballer Steve MacKenzie.

== Club career ==
=== 1983–1989: Early career and Anfield title ===
Adams signed for Arsenal as a schoolboy in 1980, and made his first-team debut on 5 November 1983 against Sunderland, aged 17. He accidentally put his shorts on back-to-front before the match. Then, with virtually his first touch of the ball during the game, he gave it away, leading to Sunderland's opening goal. He put the ball into the opponents' net, but the goal was disallowed. Adams became a regular player in the 1986–87 season, winning his first major trophy that season when playing in the Football League Cup Final win over Liverpool at Wembley.

On 1 January 1988, he became Arsenal captain at the age of 21, remaining as club captain for the next 14 years until his retirement.

Adams's strong discipline of the defence was considered a factor in Arsenal winning the League Cup in 1986–87 and then the First Division championship twice; the first in 1988–89 after a win over Liverpool in the final game of the season; the second in 1990–91, losing once all season.

=== 1989–1996: Arsenal's famous back four ===
Together with Lee Dixon, Nigel Winterburn and Steve Bould, Adams was part of the "famous back four" that lined up in Arsenal's defence, which, under George Graham, was renowned for its well-disciplined use of the offside trap. These four remained formidable for over a decade. Arsenal notably conceded just 18 goals during their title-winning 1990–91 league season, and the four players amassed over 2,000 appearances for the club.

In 1992–93 Adams was the captain of the first English side to win the League Cup and FA Cup double. In 1994, Adams led Arsenal to their first European trophy in 24 years by defeating favourites Parma 1–0 in the 1994 European Cup Winners' Cup final in Copenhagen.. On 13 August 1994, he was rewarded with a testimonial at Highbury against Crystal Palace. With an attendance of only 12,348, it was generally considered poor timing by the club.

Despite this success, alcoholism increasingly blighted his life from the mid-1980s. He was reportedly often involved in fights in nightclubs, and on 6 May 1990 crashed his car into a wall in Rayleigh; his blood alcohol level was found to be more than four times the legal drink-drive limit. On 19 December that year, at Southend Crown Court, he was sentenced to four months in prison, and freed after half of his sentence on 15 February 1991, but continued drinking for another six years. Adams later said that in early 1996, aged 29, he was in a very dark period, not wanting to live when not playing football, unable to "do life". He suffered a serious knee injury in February that year and did not play for Arsenal again in the 1995–96 season. One Sunday evening he drank seven bottles of chablis, so his (first) mother-in-law took the children.

From mid-1996, with help from a man he named only as "James W", he became one of the most high-profile recovering alcoholics in the UK; his battle with alcohol is detailed in his autobiography, Addicted, which was released in May 1998 to critical acclaim. BBC News reported in 2001 that he had become tee-total.

=== 1996–2002: Wenger's arrival and retirement ===
"When I first came to Arsenal, I realised the back four were all university graduates in the art of defending. As for Tony Adams, I consider him to be a doctor of defence."

— Wenger hailing Adams' experience in 1997.

Six weeks into Adams's sobriety, Arsène Wenger arrived as Arsenal manager in October 1996. Adams reflected in 2020 that Wenger understood his psychology, and knew of the dangers of alcohol, as his parents ran a pub. Adams rewarded his manager's understanding handsomely, captaining the club to two Premiership and FA Cup Doubles, in 1997–98 and 2001–02.

In August 2002, just before the start of the 2002–03 season, Adams retired from professional football after a career spanning almost 20 years, his last match being the 2002 FA Cup Final. He played 674 matches for Arsenal (only David O'Leary has played more) and was the most successful captain in the club's history. The number 6 shirt that Adams wore when playing was not used again until the 2006–07 season, when it was assigned to Philippe Senderos.

Just before his retirement as a player, Adams had applied to become manager of Brentford (who had just missed out on promotion to Division One) after the resignation of Steve Coppell, but his application was rejected.

Nicknamed "Mr Arsenal", he was honoured by Arsenal with a second testimonial game against Celtic in May 2002 with many Arsenal legends playing, including Ian Wright, John Lukic and Adams's fellow back four stalwarts, Dixon, Winterburn and Bould. The game finished 1–1 with Lee Dixon, in his final appearance for the Gunners, getting their goal. In March 2003, just seven months after his retirement and with Arsenal BBC Sport named Adams as the former Arsenal player that the club would most benefit from returning.

In 2004, Adams was inducted into the English Football Hall of Fame in recognition of his impact on the English game, and in 2008 he was placed third in the 50 Greatest Gunners poll on the club's website.

A statue of Adams was placed outside Emirates Stadium in celebration of the club's 125th anniversary on 9 December 2011. Manager Herbert Chapman and Arsenal's all-time top goal scorer Thierry Henry, and later Dennis Bergkamp and Arsène Wenger, were also immortalised with statues outside the ground.

== International career ==
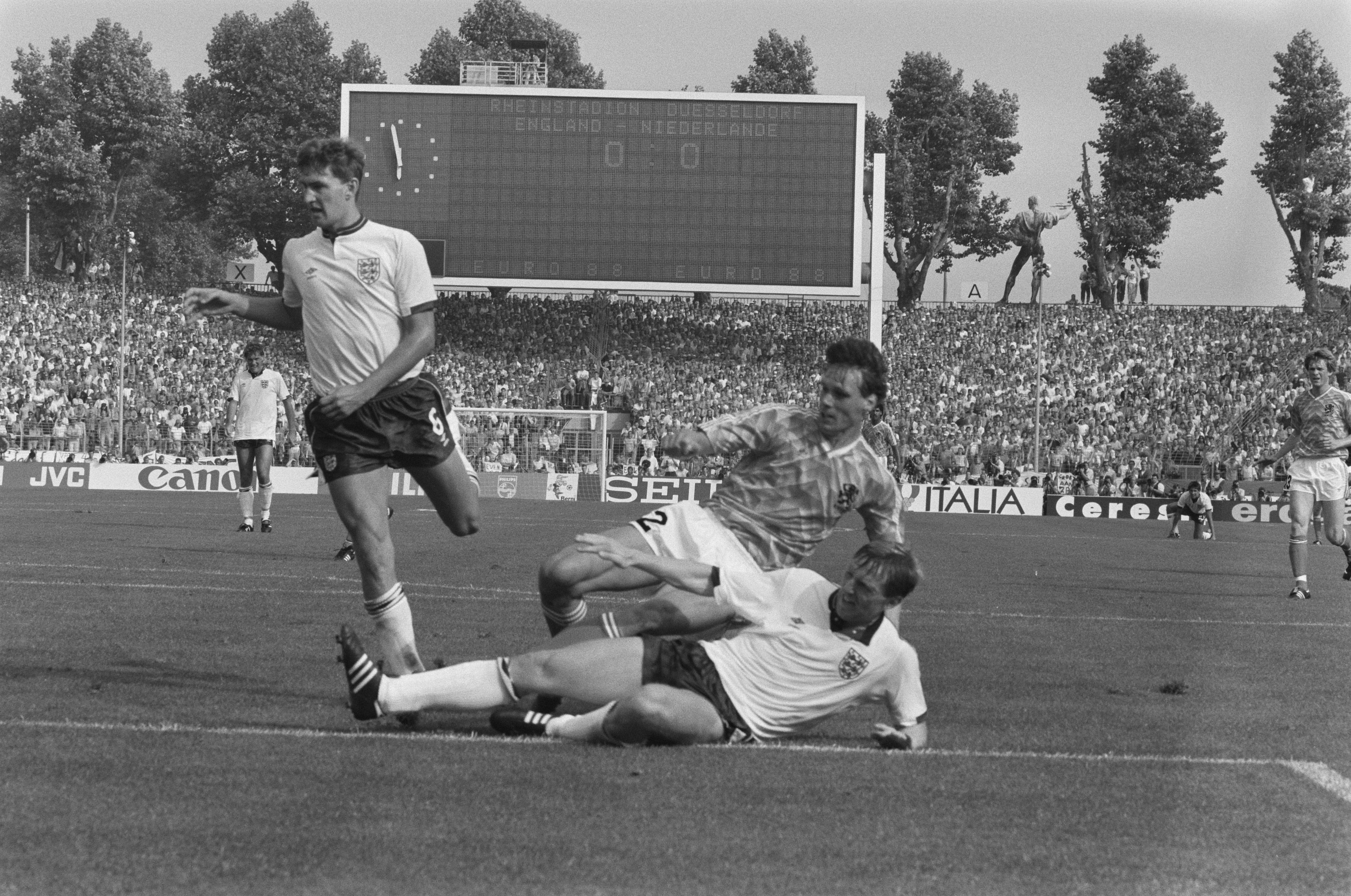
Adams (left) playing for England at UEFA Euro 1988, as the Netherlands' Marco van Basten scores the first of his three goals

Adams made his debut for England against Spain in 1987, and played in UEFA Euro 1988 in West Germany. England lost all three games, but Adams scored in a 3–1 defeat to the Soviet Union. He was the first player to represent England who had been born after the 1966 World Cup win.

After a highly promising start to his international career, Adams suffered a series of setbacks during the early 1990s. He was surprisingly left out of the 1990 FIFA World Cup squad by manager Bobby Robson, missed UEFA Euro 1992 due to injury, whilst England failed to qualify for the 1994 FIFA World Cup. England reached the semi-finals of UEFA Euro 1996 as the host nation, before losing on penalties to Germany.

Adams appeared at the 1998 FIFA World Cup in France. Later that year, he made headlines for several statements in his autobiography Addicted, criticising manager Glenn Hoddle for his management of David Beckham and Paul Gascoigne, and for making Alan Shearer captain instead of Adams; he also called Gascoigne an alcoholic, which was denied by the player's representatives. Hoddle told the press that he had no problems with Adams's opinions from the book.

His international swansong was England's unsuccessful UEFA Euro 2000 campaign in Belgium and the Netherlands. Adams started England's opening game against Portugal but suffered an injury during the match and missed the rest of the tournament.

With Shearer retiring from international football after the tournament, Adams regained the captaincy. However, within months, England lost a World Cup qualifier to Germany in October 2000, the match being the last to be staged at Wembley Stadium, before the stadium was demolished for rebuilding. That match was Adams's 60th Wembley appearance, a record. With Sven-Göran Eriksson eventually taking the helm and under increasing pressure for his place from the emerging and improving Rio Ferdinand, Adams retired from international football, having made 66 appearances, before Eriksson selected his first squad. He was the last England player to score at the old Wembley Stadium when he scored England's second goal in a 2–0 friendly win over Ukraine on 31 May 2000. This was also his first goal since he scored in a friendly against Saudi Arabia in November 1988, thus making the record for the longest gap between goals for England.

== Style of play ==
Described as a "stopper" (or man–marking defender) by Tom Sheen of The Guardian in 2014, Adams played as a centre-back. A tall, brave, rugged, physical, and committed defender, his main traits were his leadership, aerial prowess, and his ability to read the game and time his tackles. While initially he was not known to be the most gifted player on the ball from a technical standpoint, he developed this aspect of his game under Wenger, and he later excelled as a ball-playing centre-back, in which he became known for his ability to carry the ball out from the back, as well as his penchant for undertaking individual runs. However, he was also known for his lack of pace.

== Managerial and coaching career ==
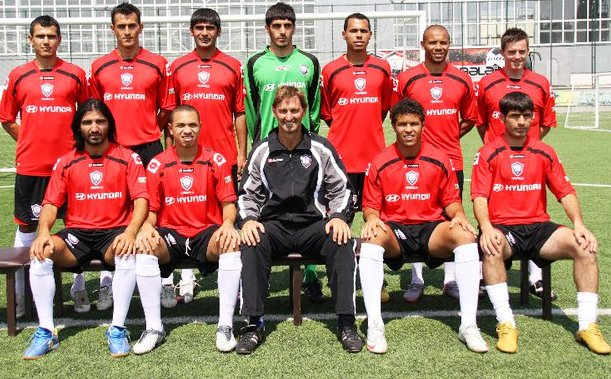
Adams (centre) with the Gabala senior team in 2010

After starting a sports science degree at Brunel University, Adams became the manager of Wycombe Wanderers on 5 November 2003. He took over the team that were in last place in the Football League Second Division (third tier). On his debut three days later, he won 4–1 at home to Swindon Town in the first round of the FA Cup. After a 2–1 loss at Tranmere Rovers on 12 April 2004 left the Chairboys 12 points inside the relegation zone with four games remaining, Adams said that his team would carry on fighting; unbeknown to the club, they were already relegated as two teams above them still had to play each other.

Wycombe began 2004–05 in the fourth tier, renamed League Two. Although the club were top of the table in August 2004, a loss of form saw them fall down the table. Adams resigned from Wycombe on 9 November 2004, with the club in 17th, citing personal reasons.

In July 2005, Adams accepted a trainee coaching role with Dutch side Feyenoord with special responsibility for its Jong team, which is a reserve/junior side. Adams later had a short spell seconded to Utrecht as a first team trainee coach in January and February 2006. While at Feyenoord he also worked part-time as a scout for Arsenal, watching games in Italy, France and the Netherlands.

Adams joined Portsmouth as assistant manager to Harry Redknapp in June 2006, a position left vacant by the departure of Kevin Bond. In his first season as assistant, Portsmouth finished ninth in the Premier League – their highest standing since the 1950s and won the 2007–08 FA Cup. Adams was appointed caretaker manager of Portsmouth in October 2008, alongside Joe Jordan, following the departure of Harry Redknapp to Tottenham Hotspur. He was subsequently appointed full-time manager. He was dismissed in February 2009 after 16 games in charge in which Portsmouth gained only 10 points.

In May 2010, Adams signed a three-year contract to manage Azerbaijani club FC Gabala of the Azerbaijan Premier League. He departed as coach of Gabala due on 16 November 2011, before the end of the 2011–12 season.

In October 2012, Adams returned to Gabala in the capacity of Sporting Director.

Whilst sporting director at Gabala, Adams suffered from acute chest pain whilst exercising. At the Baku Medical Plaza he was diagnosed with a severely blocked vein and underwent a successful angioplasty. After disclosing the surgery, Adams said the minor heart operation saved his life.

On 10 April 2017, Adams was named as manager of La Liga strugglers Granada CF until the end of the 2016–17 season. At the end of the season, Granada were relegated from La Liga ending their six-year stay in the top division. Adams lost all seven games as manager and was subsequently dismissed.

== Outside football ==
Adams married Jane Shea in 1992, after they met at a nightclub in Islington; the couple had two children together, a son and a daughter. They divorced in 1997 amid the couple's substance abuse. Following his recovery from alcoholism, Adams married Poppy Teacher in 2004 and had three children together. Poppy is a fifth-generation descendent of whisky firm founder William Teacher.

Adams said that his alcoholism reached its peak in 1996. It was common for him to wake up in soiled sheets, having wet the bed. During this period, he said he was tormented with self-loathing and hired sex workers to a hotel in central London.

In September 2000, as a result of his own experiences with alcoholism and drug addiction, Adams founded the Sporting Chance Clinic, a charitable foundation aimed at providing treatment, counselling and support for sports men and women suffering from drink, drug or gambling addictions. The clinic is modelled on the substance-abuse rehabilitation facility Crossroads Centre, founded by music artist Eric Clapton. The registered charity is supported by Elton John, Kate Hoey, Lee Dixon, Tony Smith, Tony McCoy, and Kelly Holmes. Adams' Arsenal testimonial match in May 2002 also raised £500,000 for the foundation.

During the COVID-19 pandemic, Adams founded Six Mental Health Solutions (SIX MHS), an organisation that provides mental health and addiction services to employees across a range of partnered businesses. SIX MHS has since formed partnerships with several organisations, including the building materials company Jewson in 2021, and the Football Writers' Association in 2024. He is also a patron of the National Association for Children of Alcoholics (NACOA UK), The Forward Trust, School-Home Support (SHS), and Saving Faces, a facial surgery research foundation.

In December 2018, Adams was named as the 29th President of the Rugby Football League, replacing politician Andy Burnham; he was succeeded in the honorary role by broadcaster Clare Balding a year later. Adams also took part as a celebrity contestant in the twentieth series of Strictly Come Dancing in 2022. After partnering with dance professional Katya Jones, the duo placed ninth after Adams was forced to withdraw due to injury. Adams also advised novelist Jilly Cooper on her 2023 book Tackle!

== Playing statistics ==
=== Club ===
Appearances and goals by club, season and competition
Club	Season	League			FA Cup		League Cup		Europe		Other		Total	
Club	Season	Division	Apps	Goals	Apps	Goals	Apps	Goals	Apps	Goals	Apps	Goals	Apps	Goals
Arsenal	1983–84	First Division	3	0	0	0	0	0	—		—		3	0
Arsenal	1984–85	First Division	16	0	1	0	1	0	—		—		18	0
Arsenal	1985–86	First Division	10	0	0	0	0	0	—		—		10	0
Arsenal	1986–87	First Division	42	6	4	0	9	0	—		—		55	6
Arsenal	1987–88	First Division	39	2	4	0	8	0	—		—		51	2
Arsenal	1988–89	First Division	36	4	2	0	5	0	—		3 (Note: Appearances in Football League Centenary Trophy)	1	46	5
Arsenal	1989–90	First Division	38	5	3	0	4	0	—		1 (Note: Appearance in FA Charity Shield)	0	46	5
Arsenal	1990–91	First Division	30	1	3	1	4	2	—		—		37	4
Arsenal	1991–92	First Division	35	2	1	0	3	0	4 (Note: Appearances in European Cup/UEFA Champions League)	0	1	0	44	2
Arsenal	1992–93	Premier League	35	0	8	2	9	0	—		—		52	2
Arsenal	1993–94	Premier League	35	0	3	2	2	0	8 (Note: Appearances in European Cup Winners' Cup)	2	1	0	49	4
Arsenal	1994–95	Premier League	27	3	1	0	4	1	10 (Note: Eight appearances in European Cup Winners' Cup; two appearances in European Super Cup)	0	—		42	4
Arsenal	1995–96	Premier League	21	1	2	0	5	2	—		—		28	3
Arsenal	1996–97	Premier League	28	3	3	0	3	0	1 (Note: Appearance(s) in UEFA Cup)	0	—		35	3
Arsenal	1997–98	Premier League	26	3	6	0	2	0	2	0	—		36	3
Arsenal	1998–99	Premier League	26	1	5	0	0	0	4	1	1	0	36	2
Arsenal	1999–2000	Premier League	21	0	1	1	0	0	11 (Note: Six appearances in UEFA Cup; five appearances in UEFA Champions League)	0	0	0	33	1
Arsenal	2000–01	Premier League	26	1	4	1	0	0	8	0	—		38	2
Arsenal	2001–02	Premier League	10	0	3	1	0	0	0	0	—		13	1
Career total			504	32	54	8	59	5	48	3	7	1	672	49

=== International ===
Appearances and goals by national team and year
National team	Year	Apps	Goals
England	1987	6	1
England	1988	11	3
England	1990	1	0
England	1991	1	0
England	1992	2	0
England	1993	7	0
England	1994	5	0
England	1995	6	0
England	1996	7	0
England	1997	2	0
England	1998	8	0
England	1999	6	0
England	2000	4	1
Total		66	5

Scores and results list England's goal tally first, score column indicates score after each Adams goal.

List of international goals scored by Tony Adams
No.	Date	Venue	Opponent	Score	Result	Competition	Ref.
1	11 November 1987	Stadion Crvene Zvezde, Belgrade, Yugoslavia	Yugoslavia	4–0	4–1	UEFA Euro 1988 qualifying	
2	23 March 1988	Wembley Stadium, London, England	Netherlands	2–2	2–2	Friendly	
3	18 June 1988	Waldstadion, Frankfurt, Germany	Soviet Union	1–1	1–3	UEFA Euro 1988	
4	16 November 1988	King Fahd Stadium, Riyadh, Saudi Arabia	Saudi Arabia	1–1	1–1	Friendly	
5	31 May 2000	Wembley Stadium, London, England	Ukraine	2–0	2–0	Friendly	

== Managerial statistics ==
Managerial record by team and tenure
Team	From	To	Record				
Team	From	To	P	W	D	L	Win %
Wycombe Wanderers	5 November 2003	9 November 2004	53	12	21	20	22.6
Portsmouth	28 October 2008	9 February 2009	21	4	6	11	19.0
Gabala	12 May 2010	16 November 2011	45	17	15	13	37.8
Granada	10 April 2017	3 June 2017	7	0	0	7	0.0
Total			126	33	42	51	26.2

== Honours ==
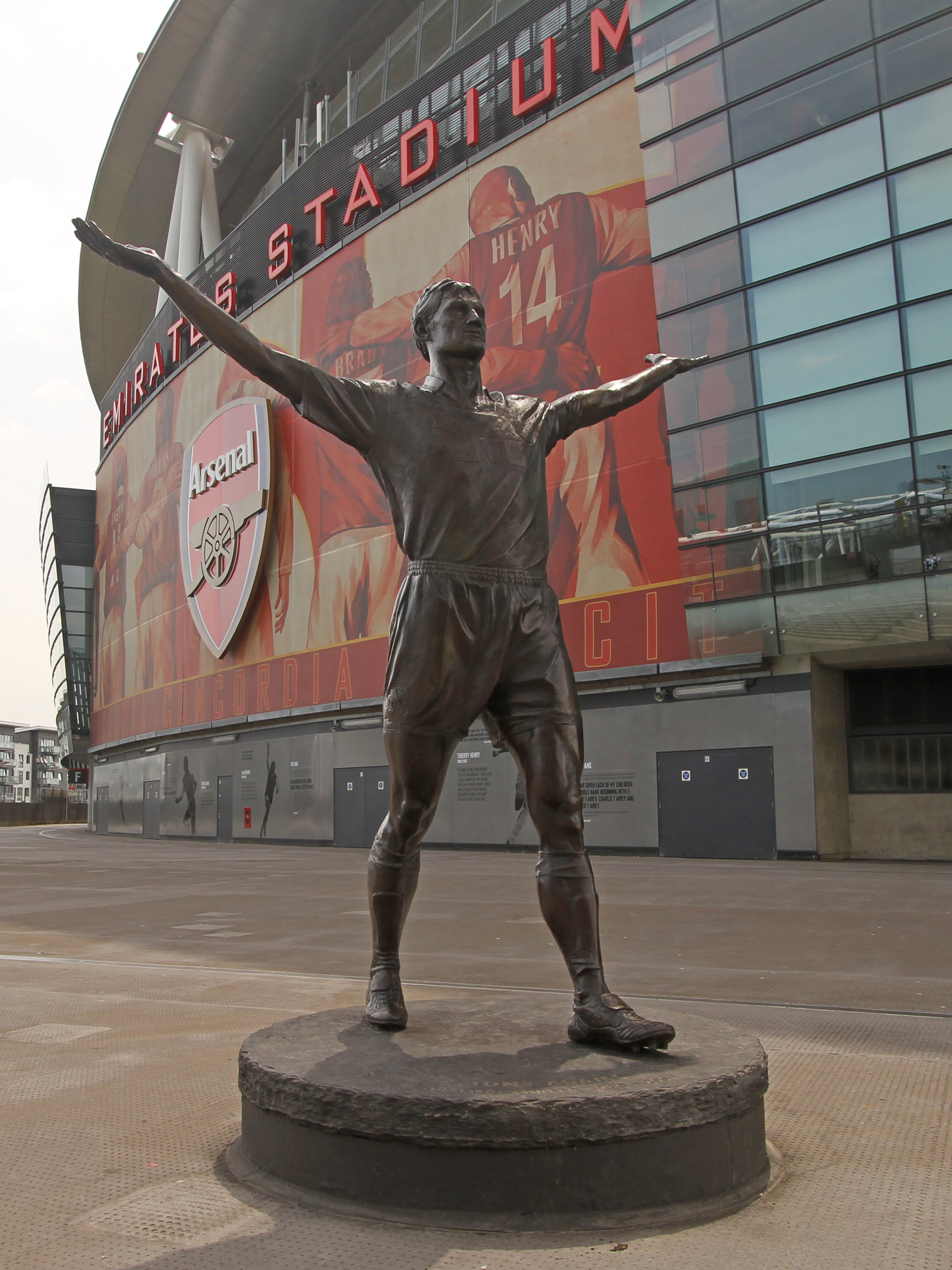
Adams statue outside Arsenal's Emirates Stadium

Arsenal

- Football League First Division: 1988–89, 1990–91
- Premier League: 1997–98, 2001–02
- FA Cup: 1992–93, 1997–98, 2001–02; runner-up: 2000–01
- Football League Cup: 1986–87, 1992–93; runner-up: 1987–88
- FA Charity Shield: 1991 (shared), 1998, 1999
- Football League Centenary Trophy: 1988
- European/UEFA Cup Winners' Cup: 1993–94; runner-up: 1994–95
- UEFA Cup runner-up: 1999–2000

Individual

- English Football Hall of Fame: 2004
- Premier League Hall of Fame: 2023
- Football League 100 Legends
- PFA Young Player of the Year: 1986–87
- PFA First Division/Premier League Team of the Year: 1986–87, 1993–94, 1995–96, 1996–97
- Ballon d'Or nominated: 1998
- Premier League 10 Seasons Awards: (1992–93 to 2001–02)
  - Domestic Team of the Decade
  - Overall Team of the Decade
- Premier League 20 Seasons Awards: (1992–93 to 2011–12)
  - Public choice Fantasy Teams of the 20 Seasons
  - Panel choice Fantasy Teams of the 20 Seasons
- FWA Tribute Award: 2002–03
- Arsenal Player of the Season: 1986−87, 1989−90, 1993−94

Orders

- Member of the Most Excellent Order of the British Empire: 1999

== Publications ==
- Adams, Tony; Ridley, Ian (1999). Addicted. London: CollinsWillow. ISBN 978-0002187954.
- —————; ————— (2017). Sober: Football. My Story. My Life. London: Simon & Schuster. ISBN 978-1-4711-5674-8.

== See also ==
- List of England national football team captains
- List of footballers in England by number of league appearances
- List of Arsenal F.C. players
- List of Portsmouth F.C. managers
- List of Wycombe Wanderers F.C. managers
- List of one-club men
