= Brian Kelly (footballer, born 1937) =

English footballer

Personal information
- Full name: William Brian Kelly
- Date of birth: 25 September 1937
- Place of birth: Isleworth, England
- Date of death: March 2013 (aged 75)
- Place of death: Redbridge, England
- Position: Centre forward

Senior career*
Years	Team	Apps	(Gls)
- Dover
1958–1959	Queens Park Rangers	6	(0)
- Dover
- Bexleyheath & Welling
- Romford
- Bexley United
Total		6+	(0+)
- * Club domestic league appearances and goals

William Brian Kelly (25 September 1937 – March 2013) was an English professional footballer who played as a centre forward for Dover, Queens Park Rangers, Bexleyheath & Welling, Romford and Bexley United.
