= George Whitelaw =

Scottish footballer (1937–2004)

Personal information
- Full name: George Whitelaw
- Date of birth: 1 January 1937
- Place of birth: Paisley, Renfrewshire, Scotland
- Date of death: 2004 (aged 66–67)
- Height: 5 ft 10 in (1.78 m)
- Position: Forward

Senior career*
Years	Team	Apps	(Gls)
1954–1955	Petershill		
1955–1958	St Johnstone		
1958–1959	Sunderland	5	(0)
1959	Queen`s Park Rangers	26	(10)
1959–1961	Halifax Town	52	(22)
1961–1962	Carlisle United	34	(10)
1962–1963	Stockport County	52	(18)
1963–1964	Barrow	7	(0)
1964	St Johnstone		
1964–196?	Stenhousemuir		
- * Club domestic league appearances and goals

George Whitelaw (1 January 1937 – 2004) was a Scottish professional footballer who played as a forward for Sunderland.
