= Pat Welton =

English footballer

Personal information
- Full name: Roy Patrick Welton
- Date of birth: 3 May 1928
- Place of birth: Eltham, Greenwich, England
- Date of death: 28 June 2010 (aged 82)
- Place of death: Romford, London, England
- Position: Goalkeeper

Senior career*
Years	Team	Apps	(Gls)
1949–1958	Leyton Orient	263	(0)
1958–1959	QPR	3	(0)

Managerial career
- 1959: St. Albans City
- 1960: Clapton
- Walthamstow Avenue
- 1962–1964: England U-18
- 1968–1969: Corinthian-Casuals
- * Club domestic league appearances and goals

Pat Welton (1928-2010) was a former football player for Leyton Orient and Queens Park Rangers.

Following his retirement from playing, he took over as manager of St. Albans City F.C. in 1959. He later worked as Keith Burkinshaw's assistant manager during his time at Tottenham Hotspur F.C. and the Bahrain national football team.

As head coach of the England under-18 national football team, he won the UEFA European Under-18 Championship twice, first winning in 1963 and retaining the title in 1964.

As well as his managerial career at minor clubs, he was also a

Pat was a popular figure around East Greenwich where he was pub landlord at the Old Friends on Trafalgar Road in Greenwich, where he also managed his pub football team the Greenwich Old Friends to great success.
