= Keith Waldon =

English football manager and physiotherapist

Keith Waldon is a physiotherapist and sports coach, who was assistant manager of Portsmouth F.C. under Terry Fenwick. He also acted as caretaker manager of the club in January 1998, after Fenwick's dismissal.

== Playing career ==
Keith Waldon played for Chelsea as a schoolboy then moved to Millwall as an apprentice professional and two years later signed professional terms. He failed to break into the first team and moved to the Southern League with Chelmsford City then to South Africa to play for Berea Park. There he sustained a broken leg which threatened to end his career but when Waldon returned to England he eventually recovered enough to play amateur football for Croydon, Dulwich Hamlet and Sutton United.

== Coaching career ==
Waldon had obtained his coaching badges while at Millwall and began working for the Football Association, running coach education courses. He progressed to coaching foreign managers and coaches when they sought their UEFA coaching badges. David Pleat persuaded Waldon to join the coaching staff of Tottenham Hotspur in 1984, acting as assistant to youth team manager Keith Blunt. Waldon took over as youth team manager when Blunt left, and was in charge of the team that won the FA Youth Cup in 1990.

Waldon left Tottenham in 1994 and joined Portsmouth, becoming caretaker manager in January 1998. In his time as caretaker, Waldon lost all three of his matches and at the end of January, Alan Ball was appointed as manager.

Keith is now the owner of Up&Running Sports Injuries Clinics Limited, where he acts as a director and therapist. He is also a qualified athletics and tennis coach.
