= Arsenal F.C. =

Association football club in England

Arsenal
- Full name: The Arsenal Football Club
- Nicknames: The Gunners; Gooners (supporters)
- Founded: 4 October 1886; 140 years ago as Dial Square F.C.
- Ground: Emirates Stadium
- Capacity: 60,704
- Coordinates: 51°33′18″N 0°6′30″W
- Owner: Kroenke Sports & Entertainment
- Co-chairmen: Stan Kroenke; Josh Kroenke
- Manager: Mikel Arteta
- League: Premier League
- 2025–26: Premier League, 1st of 20
- Website: arsenal.com
Home colours	Away colours	Third colours

The Arsenal Football Club, otherwise known as simply Arsenal, is a professional football club based in Islington, North London, England. They compete in the Premier League, the top tier of English football. Domestically, Arsenal have won 14 league titles (including one unbeaten), a record 14 FA Cups, 2 League Cups, 18 FA Community Shields and a Football League Centenary Trophy. In European football, they have won one European Cup Winners' Cup and one Inter-Cities Fairs Cup. In terms of trophies won, it is the third-most successful club in English football, and one of the most successful clubs in world football.

Arsenal was the first club from southern England to join the Football League in 1893, officially joining the First Division in 1904. Arsenal carries the longest active streak continuously in the top division (over 105 years and counting) and completed the 20th century with the highest average league position of any club. Arsenal has won the second-most top-flight matches in English football history. In the 1930s, Arsenal won five League Championships and two FA Cups, with another FA Cup and two more Championships coming after the war. In 1970–71, it won its first League and FA Cup double. Between 1989 and 2005, the club won five league titles and five FA Cups, including two more doubles. Between 1998 and 2017, Arsenal qualified for the UEFA Champions League for an English football record of nineteen consecutive seasons. The club finished as Champions League runners-up in 2006 and 2026.

In 1886, munitions workers at the Royal Arsenal in Woolwich founded the club as Dial Square. In 1913, the club crossed the city to the Arsenal Stadium in Highbury, becoming close neighbours of Tottenham Hotspur, thus creating the North London derby. Herbert Chapman won the club its first silverware, and his legacy enabled a trophy-laden period in the 1930s. He helped introduce the WM formation, floodlights, and shirt numbers; he also added the white sleeves and brighter red to the club's jersey. Arsène Wenger was the club's longest-serving manager and won the most trophies. He won a record seven FA Cups, and his third and final title-winning team set an English record for the longest top-flight unbeaten league run at 49 games between 2003 and 2004, receiving the nickname "The Invincibles".

In 2006, the club moved to the nearby Emirates Stadium. With an annual revenue of £616.6m in the 2023–24 season, Arsenal was estimated to be worth US$3.4 billion by Forbes, making it the world's eighth-most valuable football club, while also being one of the most followed sport teams in the world on social media. The motto of the club is Victoria Concordia Crescit, Latin for "Victory Through Harmony".

== History ==
=== 1886–1912: Dial Square to Royal Arsenal ===
David Danskin, a Scotsman, was the principal founder of Arsenal Football Club.

Dial Square Cricket Club, a works cricket team within the Royal Arsenal Ordnance in Woolwich, commemorated the end of their season with a "smoking concert" on 4 October 1886 at the Prince of Wales public house in Plumstead Common.

At the event, attended by Scotsman David Danskin, it was agreed to expand the cricket club and add a football section, Danskin and fifteen fellow munitions workers formed the Dial Square Football Club, named after a workshop at the heart of the Royal Arsenal complex. Each member contributed sixpence, and Danskin also added three shillings to help form the club. (Note: Woolwich and Plumstead were officially part of Kent until the creation of the County of London in 1889. The Arsenal History provides primary sources on the name, first meeting, and first match. Bernard Joy says Danskin was captain at founding. Danskin was made official captain the next month.) Dial Square played their first match on 11 December 1886 against the Eastern Wanderers and won 6–0. The club had been renamed Royal Arsenal by January 1887, and its first home was Plumstead Common, though they spent most of their time playing at the Manor Ground. Their first trophies were the Kent Senior Cup and London Charity Cup in 1889–90 and the London Senior Cup in 1890–91; these were the only county association trophies Arsenal won during their time in South East London. In 1891, Royal Arsenal became the first London club to turn professional.

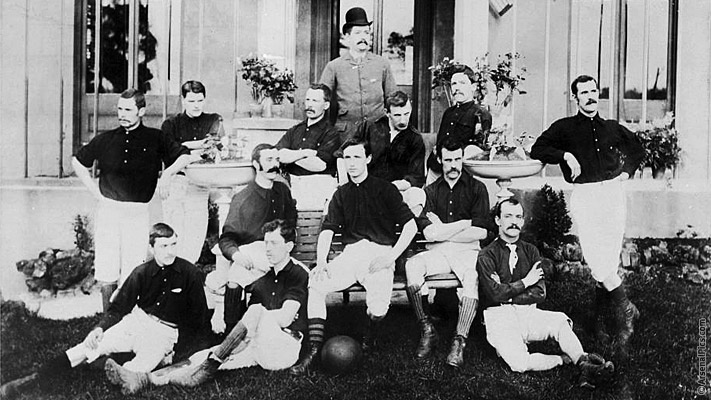
Royal Arsenal squad in 1888. Original captain David Danskin sits on the right of the bench.

Woolwich Arsenal squad

Royal Arsenal was renamed for the second time upon becoming a limited liability company in 1893. They registered their new name, Woolwich Arsenal, with the Football League when the club ascended later that year. Woolwich Arsenal was the first southern member of the Football League, starting out in the Second Division and reaching the First Division in 1904. Falling attendances, due to financial difficulties among the munitions workers and the arrival of more accessible football clubs elsewhere in the city, led the club close to bankruptcy by 1910. Businessmen Henry Norris and William Hall became involved in the club, and sought to move them elsewhere.

=== 1912–1925: Bank of England club ===
In 1913, soon after relegation back to the Second Division, the club moved across the river to the new Arsenal Stadium in Highbury. In 1919, the Football League controversially voted to promote The Arsenal, instead of relegated local rivals Tottenham Hotspur, into the newly enlarged First Division, despite only finishing fifth in the Second Division's last pre-war season of 1914–15. Later that year, The Arsenal started dropping "The" in official documents, gradually shifting its name for the final time towards Arsenal, as it is generally known today.

With a new home and First Division football, attendances were more than double those at the Manor Ground, and Arsenal's budget grew rapidly. With record-breaking spending and gate receipts, Arsenal quickly became known as the Bank of England club.

=== 1925–1934: Herbert Chapman's legendary Gunners ===
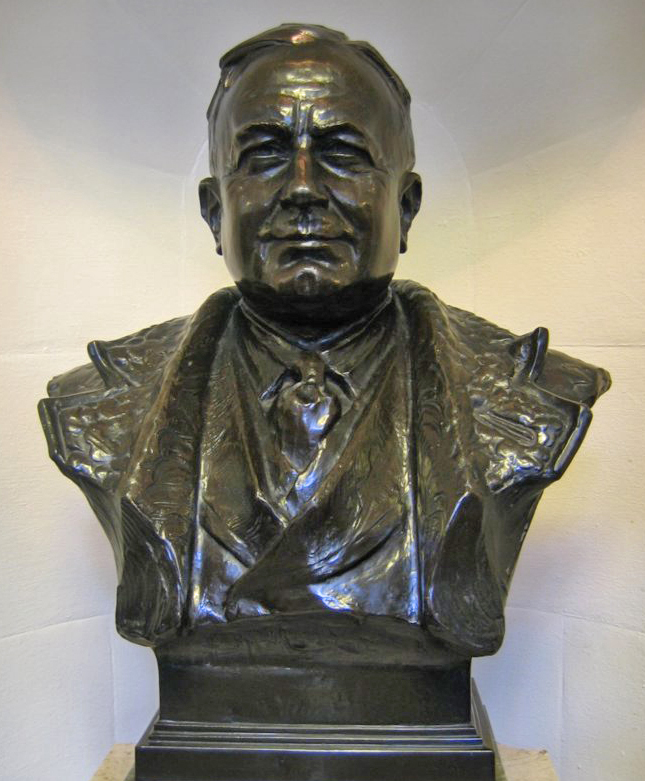
A bronze bust of Herbert Chapman stands inside the Emirates Stadium.

Arsenal's location and record-breaking salary offer lured star Huddersfield Town manager Herbert Chapman in 1925. Over the next five years, Chapman built a revolutionary new Arsenal. Firstly, he appointed a new trainer, Tom Whittaker who would one day rise to become a fabled Arsenal manager himself. With the help of player Charlie Buchan, implemented the nascent WM formation which would serve as a stable bedrock to his outfit. He also captured young talents such as Cliff Bastin and Eddie Hapgood, whilst also lavishing Highbury's high income on stars such as David Jack and Alex James.

Transformed, Chapman's Arsenal claimed their first national trophy, the FA Cup in 1930, and League Championships followed in 1930–31 and 1932–33. Chapman also presided over off-pitch changes: white sleeves and shirt numbers were added to the kit; (Note: The new shirts are exhibited in The Arsenal Shirt. Newspaper accounts of the addition of white sleeves are provided by Mark Andrews. The contemporary discussion around the first use of shirt numbers, and its initial trial by Chelsea F.C., is provided by Neil Glackin.) a Tube station was named after the club; and the first of two opulent Art Deco stands was completed, with some of the first floodlights in English football. Suddenly, in the middle of the 1933–34 season, Chapman died of pneumonia.

=== 1934–1947: Shaw, Allison and the Second World War ===
Arsenal squad from 1936.

Chapman's death meant work was left to his colleagues Joe Shaw and George Allison, with both proving to be shrewd and consummate custodians of Chapman's Arsenal team, seeing out a hat-trick of league wins with the 1933–34, 1934–35, and 1937–38 titles, and then furthermore winning the 1936 FA Cup.

World War II meant the Football League was suspended for seven years. While Arsenal were paraded by the nation as a symbol of solidarity with war efforts, the war took a huge toll on the team as the club had had more players killed than any top flight club. Furthermore, debt from reconstructing an ambitious North Bank Stand redevelopment greatly bled Arsenal's resources.

=== 1947–1962: Tom Whittaker's meteoric Gunners ===
Despite this period of turbulence and churn, Arsenal returned to win the league in the second post-war season of 1947–48. This was Tom Whittaker's first season as manager, and meant the club equalled the champions of England record. Whittaker, despite his humble and modest disposition, was oft-referred to as the "brains" behind Chapman's legendary Arsenal side. He gathered a successful and highly skilled Arsenal side in spite of greatly limited resources, with a fiery and expansive style that drove great fanfare at the time.

They won a third FA Cup in 1950, and then won a record-breaking seventh championship in 1952–53, making Arsenal the most successful team in English history at the time.

=== 1962–1984: Billy Wright, Bertie Mee and Terry Neill's cohorts ===
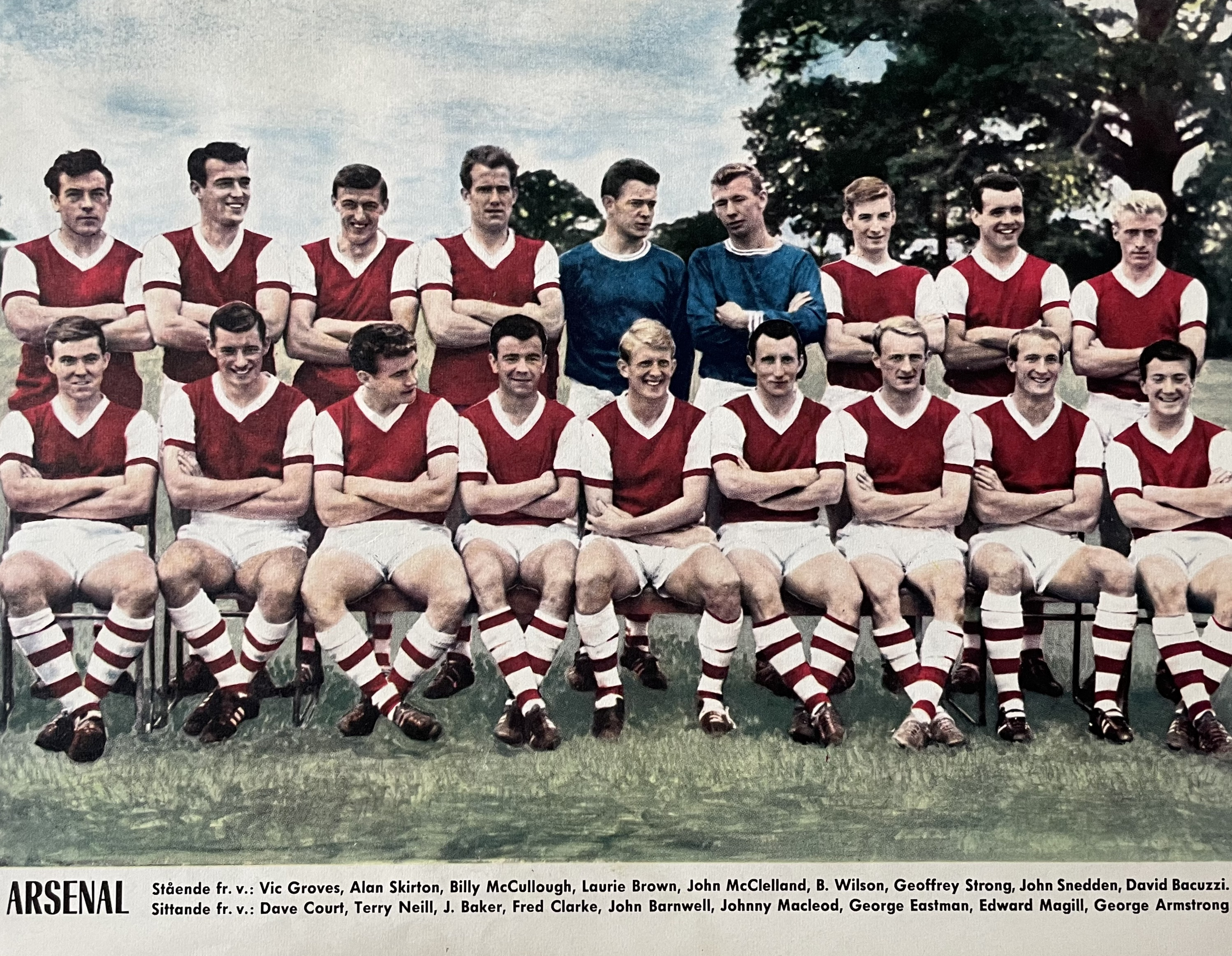
Arsenal squad in 1964.

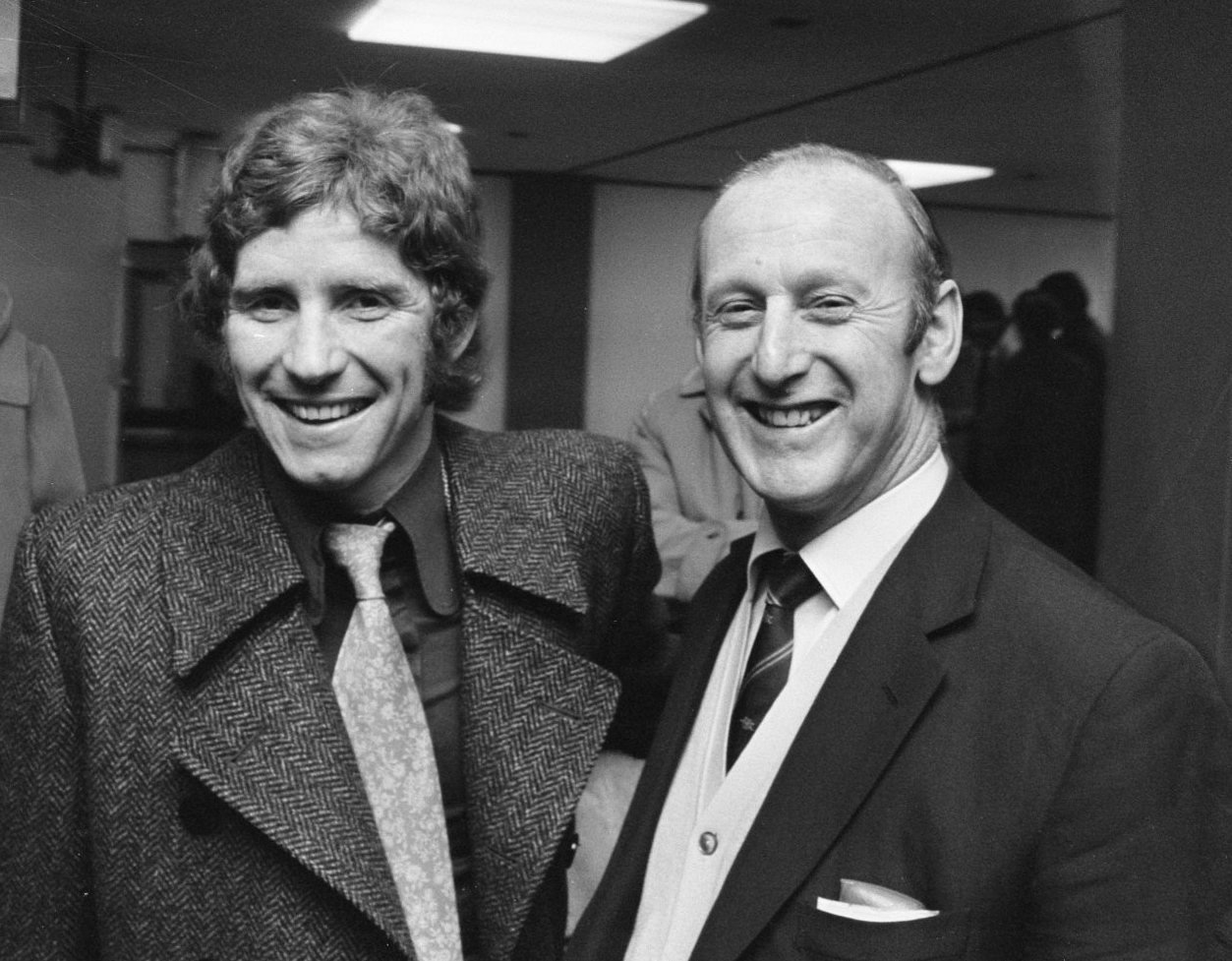
Alan Ball (left) and Bertie Mee (who led Arsenal to their first double in 1971), pictured in 1972

Arsenal were not to win the League or the FA Cup for another 18 years. The '53 Champions squad had aged, and the club failed to attract strong enough replacements. Although Arsenal were competitive during these years, their fortunes had waned; the club spent most of the 1950s and 1960s in mid-table mediocrity. Even former England captain Billy Wright could not bring the club any success as manager, in a stint between 1962 and 1966.

Arsenal tentatively appointed club physiotherapist Bertie Mee as acting manager in 1966 to incredulity by fans, sportsmedia press. With new assistant Don Howe and new players such as Bob McNab and George Graham, Mee led Arsenal to their first League Cup finals, in 1967–68 and 1968–69. Next season saw a breakthrough, with Arsenal's first competitive European trophy, the 1969–70 Inter-Cities Fairs Cup. The season after, Arsenal achieved an even greater triumph with their first League and FA Cup double, and a new champions of England record. This marked a premature high point of the decade; the Double-winning side was soon broken up and the rest of the decade was characterised by a series of near misses, with Arsenal finishing as FA Cup runners up in 1972, and First Division runners-up in 1972–73.

Former player Terry Neill succeeded Mee in 1976. At the age of 34, he became the youngest Arsenal manager to date. With new signings like Malcolm Macdonald and Pat Jennings, and a crop of talent in the side like Liam Brady and Frank Stapleton, the club reached a trio of FA Cup finals (1978 FA Cup, 1979 FA Cup and 1980 FA Cup), and lost the 1980 European Cup Winners' Cup Final on penalties. The club's only trophy during this time was the 1979 FA Cup, achieved with a last-minute 3–2 victory over Manchester United, in a final is widely regarded as a classic.

=== 1984–1996: George Graham's Arsenal ===
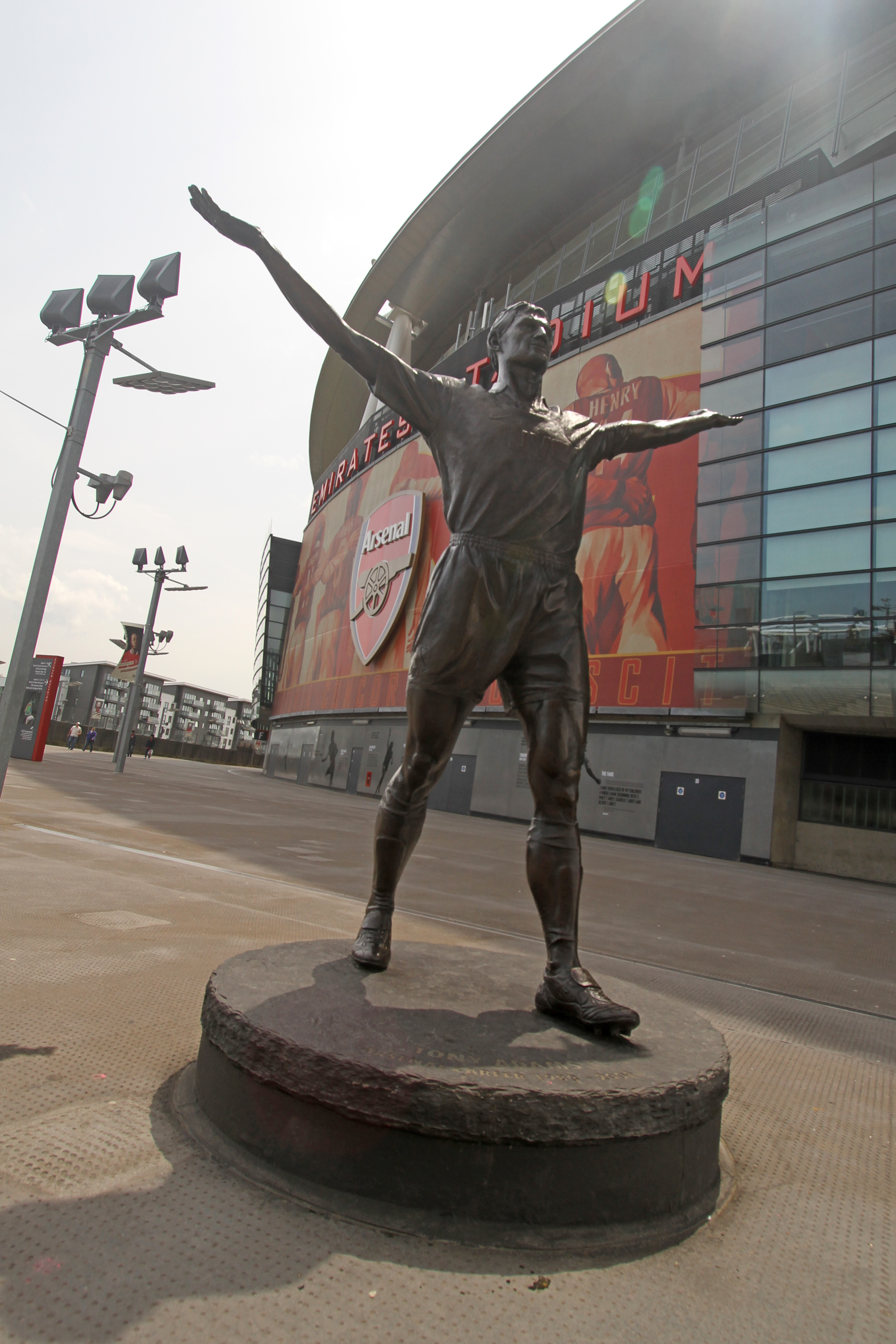
Tony Adams statue outside the Emirates Stadium

One of Mee's double winners, George Graham, returned as manager in 1986, with Arsenal winning their first League Cup in 1987, Graham's first season in charge. New signings Nigel Winterburn, Lee Dixon and Steve Bould had joined the club by 1988 to complete the "famous Back Four", led by homegrown player Tony Adams. (Note: Martin Keown was the 'fifth' member of the Back Four, but did not play for the club between 1986 and 1993.) Graham's credo of prioritising defensive excellence seemingly clashed with the club's traditionally expansive motifs in approaching football, and many had scepticism whether it would work with the young squad at the club in that time period; however, his methods quickly gained a cult following after initial successes.

The side immediately won the 1988 Football League Centenary Trophy, and followed it with the 1988–89 Football League title, snatched with a last-minute goal in the final game of the season against fellow title challengers Liverpool. Graham's Arsenal won another title in 1990–91, losing only one match, won the FA Cup and League Cup double in 1993, the European Cup Winners' Cup in 1994, and also participated and was defeated in the 1994 European Super Cup final by European champions AC Milan. Graham's reputation was tarnished when he was found to have taken kickbacks from agent Rune Hauge for signing certain players, and he was dismissed in February 1995. His replacement, Bruce Rioch, lasted for only one season, taking the side to the second European Cup Winners' Cup final in a row, lost against Real Zaragoza, but he left the club after a dispute with the board of directors.

=== 1996–2018: Arsène Wenger revolution ===
The club metamorphosed during the tenure of French manager Arsène Wenger, who was appointed in October 1996. Attacking football, an overhaul of dietary and fitness practices, (Note: These changes have received contemporary attention, and later praise and scepticism. For context of the broader use of science in English football, see Soccer Science.) and elite scouting (Note: Several analyses indicate strong league performance across the Wenger period, given Arsenal's footballing outlays, including a regression analysis on wage bills, regression on transfer spending, regression on both, and a bootstrapping approach for the period 2004–09.) defined his reign. Accumulating key players from Wenger's homeland, such as Patrick Vieira and Thierry Henry, Arsenal won a second League and Cup double in 1997–98 and a third in 2001–02. In addition, the club reached the final of the 1999–2000 UEFA Cup, were victorious in the 2003 and 2005 FA Cup finals, and won the Premier League in 2003–04 without losing a single match, an achievement which earned the side the nickname "The Invincibles". This feat came within a run of 49 league matches unbeaten from 7 May 2003 to 24 October 2004, a national record.

Arsenal finished in either first or second place in the league in eight of Wenger's first nine seasons at the club, although they never won the title in two consecutive seasons. The club had never progressed beyond the quarter-finals of the Champions League until 2005–06; in that season, they became the first club from London to reach the final in the competition's fifty-year history, but were beaten 2–1 by Barcelona. In July 2006, they moved into the Emirates Stadium, after 93 years at Highbury. Arsenal reached the finals of the 2007 and 2011 League Cups, losing 2–1 to Chelsea and Birmingham City respectively.

The club had not gained a trophy since the 2005 FA Cup until, spearheaded by club record acquisition Mesut Özil, Arsenal beat Hull City in the 2014 FA Cup final, coming back from a 2–0 deficit to win the match 3–2. A year later, Arsenal completed another victorious FA Cup campaign, and became the most successful club in the tournament's history by winning their 13th FA Cup in 2016–17. However, in that same season Arsenal finished fifth in the league, the first time they had finished outside the top four since before Wenger arrived in 1996. In his 21st and final season, Arsenal under Arsène Wenger finished sixth and won the FA Community Shield. Wenger departed Arsenal following the end of the season on 13 May 2018.

=== 2018–2019: Post-Wenger evolution ===
After conducting an overhaul in the club's operating model to coincide with Wenger's departure, Spaniard Unai Emery was named as the club's new head coach on 23 May 2018. He became the club's first ever 'head coach' and second manager from outside the United Kingdom. In Emery's first season, Arsenal finished fifth in the Premier League and as runner-up in the Europa League. On 29 November 2019, Emery was dismissed as manager and former player and assistant first team coach Freddie Ljungberg was appointed as interim head coach.

=== 2019–: Mikel Arteta era ===
On 20 December 2019, Arsenal appointed former club captain Mikel Arteta as the new head coach. Arsenal finished the 2019–20 season in eighth, their lowest finish since 1994–95, but beat Chelsea 2–1 to earn a record-extending 14th FA Cup win. After the season, Arteta's title was changed from head coach to manager. On 18 April 2021, Arsenal were announced as a founding club of the breakaway European competition The Super League; they withdrew from the competition two days later amid near-universal condemnation. Arsenal finished the 2020–21 season in eighth place once again, not qualifying for a European competition for the first time in 26 years. The season after (2021–22), Arteta had assembled the youngest outfit in the Premier League with an average starting age of 24 years and 308 days – more than a whole year younger than the next team. They finished in fifth in the Premier League that year, and qualified for next season's UEFA Europa League.

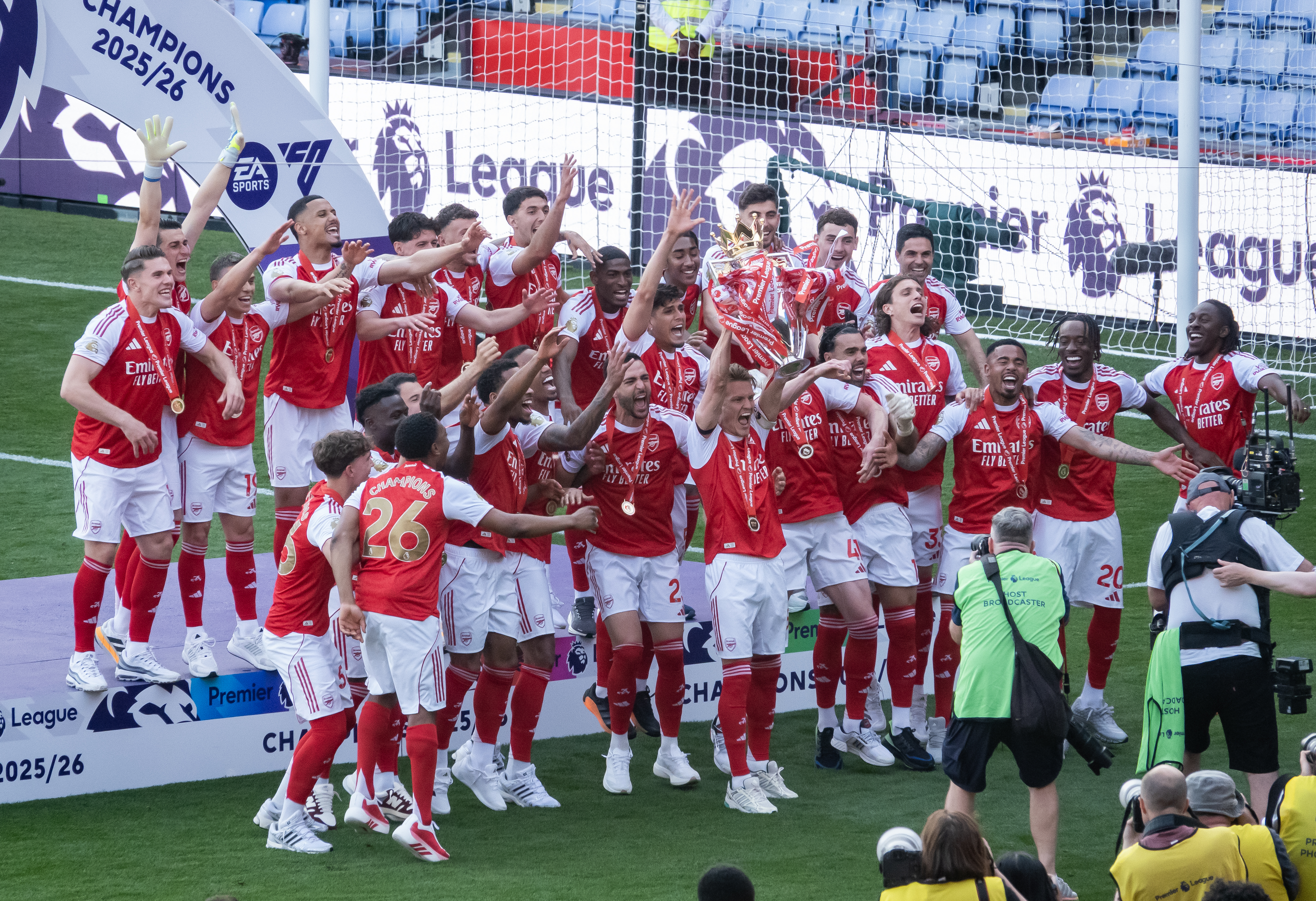
Arsenal being crowned Premier League champions on 24 May 2026

By the 2022–23 season, Arsenal returned to the Champions League by coming second to Manchester City, setting a record for most time spent on top of the table without actually winning the league, ending on 84 points. In the 2023–24 season, Arsenal beat Manchester City to claim their 17th FA Community Shield, they finished second in the Premier League to Manchester City with an improved 89 points from their previous campaign. In the 2024–25 UEFA Champions League, they reached the semi-finals only to lose to PSG 3–1 on aggregate. For the third season in a row Arsenal finished second, this time behind Liverpool, amassing a points tally of 74 in the 2024–25 Premier League season.

On 19 May 2026, in the 2025–26 season, Arsenal secured its 14th league title and its first since the 2003–04 season with one game to spare, by virtue of AFC Bournemouth's 1–1 draw against Manchester City. The title was Arsenal's first Premier League title under manager Mikel Arteta. In the same season, Arsenal reached the UEFA Champions League final for the second time in the club's history but lost to Paris Saint-Germain 4–3 on penalties after a 1–1 draw following extra time at the Puskás Aréna in Budapest.

== Crest ==
Crests of Arsenal F.C. prior to current crest
Royal Arsenal's first crest, adopted in 1888, two years after the formation of the club

'Monogram' badge used in the 1930 FA Cup Final

'Art Deco Crest'

Version of the 'Art Deco Crest' worn in the 1952 FA Cup final

Cannon featured on shirt from 1960s to 1990s

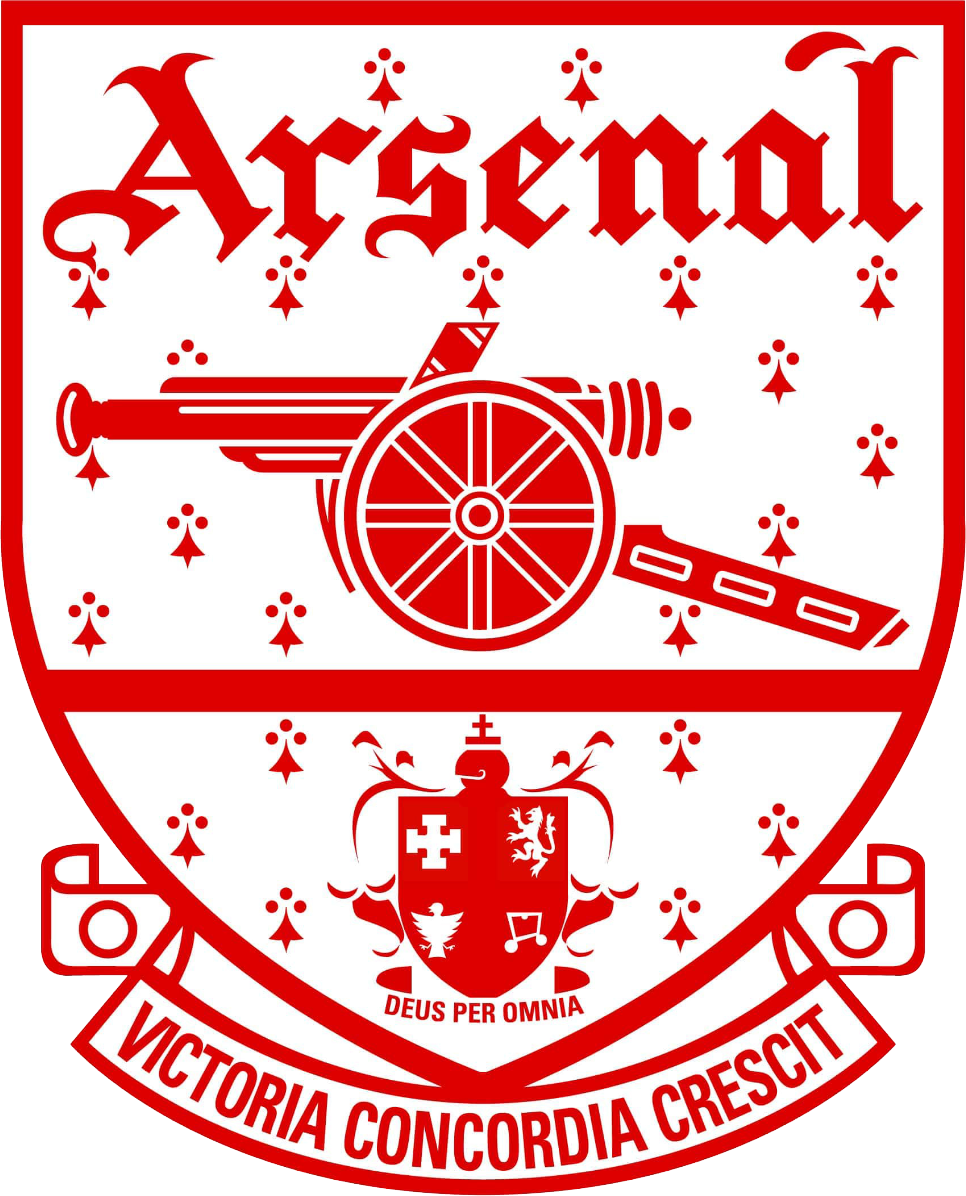
VCC crest: used between 1949 and 2002

Alternative versions of the VCC crest

c. 1990–1993

c. 1994–1995

c. 1996–2001

2001–02 season

Unveiled in 1888, Royal Arsenal's first crest featured three cannons viewed from above, pointing northwards, similar to the coat of arms of the Metropolitan Borough of Woolwich (nowadays transferred to the coat of arms of the Royal Borough of Greenwich). These can sometimes be mistaken for chimneys, but the presence of a carved lion's head and a cascabel on each are clear indicators that they are cannons. This was dropped after the move to Highbury in 1913, only to be reinstated in 1922, when the club adopted a crest featuring a single cannon, pointing eastwards, with the club's nickname, The Gunners, inscribed alongside it; this crest only lasted until 1925, when the cannon was reversed to point westward and its barrel slimmed down.

In 1949, the club unveiled a modernised crest featuring the same style of cannon below the club's name, set in blackletter typography, and above the coat of arms of the Metropolitan Borough of Islington and a scroll inscribed with the club's newly adopted Latin motto, Victoria Concordia Crescit (VCC) – "victory comes from harmony" – coined by the club's programme editor Harry Homer. For the first time, the crest was rendered in colour, which varied slightly over the crest's lifespan, finally becoming red, gold and green. Because of the numerous revisions of the crest, Arsenal were unable to copyright it. Although the club had managed to register the crest as a trademark, and had fought (and eventually won) a long legal battle with a local street trader who sold "unofficial" Arsenal merchandise, Arsenal eventually sought a more comprehensive legal protection. Therefore, in 2002 they introduced a new crest featuring more modern curved lines and a simplified style, which was copyrightable. The cannon once again faces east, and the club's name is written in a sans-serif typeface above the cannon. Green was replaced by dark blue. The new crest was criticised by some supporters; the Arsenal Independent Supporters' Association claimed that the club had ignored much of Arsenal's history and tradition with such a radical modern design, and that fans had not been properly consulted on the issue. Until the 1960s, a badge was worn on the playing shirt only for high-profile matches such as FA Cup finals, usually in the form of a monogram of the club's initials in red on a white background.

The monogram theme was developed into an Art Deco-style badge on which the letters A and C framed a football rather than the letter F, the whole set within a hexagonal border. This early example of a corporate logo, introduced as part of Herbert Chapman's rebranding of the club in the 1930s, was used not only on Cup Final shirts but as a design feature throughout Highbury Stadium, including above the main entrance and inlaid in the floors. From 1967, a white cannon was regularly worn on the shirts, until replaced by the club crest, sometimes with the addition of the nickname "The Gunners", in the 1990s.

In the 2011–12 season, Arsenal celebrated their 125th anniversary. The celebrations included a modified version of the current crest worn on their jerseys for the season. The crest was all-white, surrounded by 15 oak leaves to the right and 15 laurel leaves to the left. The oak leaves represent the 15 founding members of the club who met at the Royal Oak pub. The 15 laurel leaves represent the design detail on the six pence pieces paid by the founding fathers to establish the club. The laurel leaves also represent strength. To complete the crest, 1886 and 2011 are shown on either sides of the motto "Forward" at the bottom of the crest.

Starting in the 2021–22 season, Adidas reintroduced the cannon-only crest on that season's away kit. It was the first time it had been seen on an Arsenal shirt since 1991. It would remain in use on the away kit in 2022–23 and in 2023–24 would be added to the third kit as well, before being used on all three kits in 2024–25 – marking the first time the crest would not be seen on an Arsenal kit since its introduction in 2002.

== Colours ==
Arsenal's original home colours. The team wore a similar kit (but with redcurrant socks) during the 2005–06 season.
White sleeves first appeared on the shirt in 1933.
Yellow shirt with blue trim and blue shorts are Arsenal's traditional away colours.
Since the 1990s, Blue has been prominently used for either the away or third kit.

For much of Arsenal's history, their home colours have been bright red shirts with white sleeves and white shorts, though this has not always been the case. The choice of red is in recognition of a charitable donation from Nottingham Forest, soon after Arsenal's foundation in 1886. Two of Dial Square's founding members, Fred Beardsley and Morris Bates, were former Forest players who had moved to Woolwich for work. As they put together the first team in the area, no kit could be found, so Beardsley and Bates wrote home for help and received a set of kit and a ball. The shirt was redcurrant, a dark shade of red, and was worn with white shorts and socks with blue and white hoops.

In 1933, Herbert Chapman, wanting his players to be more distinctly dressed, updated the kit, adding white sleeves and changing the shade to a brighter pillar box red. Two possibilities have been suggested for the origin of the white sleeves. One story reports that Chapman noticed a supporter in the stands wearing a red sleeveless sweater over a white shirt; another was that he was inspired by a similar outfit worn by the cartoonist Tom Webster, with whom Chapman played golf. Regardless of which story is true, the red-and-white shirts have come to define Arsenal, and the team have worn that combination ever since that time, aside from two seasons. The first was 1966–67, when Arsenal wore all-red shirts; this proved unpopular, and the white sleeves returned the following season. The second was 2005–06, the last season that Arsenal played at Highbury, when the team wore commemorative redcurrant shirts similar to those worn in 1913, their first season in the stadium; the side reverted to their normal colours at the start of the next season. In the 2008–09 season, Arsenal replaced the traditional all-white sleeves with red sleeves that bore a broad white stripe.

Arsenal's home colours have been the inspiration for at least three other clubs. In 1909, Sparta Prague adopted a dark red kit like the one Arsenal wore at the time; in 1938, Hibernian adopted the design of the Arsenal shirt sleeves in their own green-and-white strip. In 1941, Luis Robledo, an England-schooled founder of Santa Fe and a fan of Arsenal, selected the main colours for his newly created team. In 1920, Sporting Clube de Braga's manager returned from a game at Highbury and changed his team's green kit to a duplicate of Arsenal's red-with-white-sleeves-and-shorts, giving rise to the team's nickname of Os Arsenalistas. These teams still wear those designs to this day.

For many years Arsenal's away colours were white or navy blue. However, in 1968 the FA banned navy shirts (they looked too similar to referees' black kit), so in the 1969–70 season Arsenal introduced an away kit of yellow shirts with blue shorts. This kit was worn in the 1971 FA Cup Final when Arsenal beat Liverpool to secure the double for the first time in their history. The yellow and blue strip became almost as famous as their iconic red-and-white home kit. Arsenal reached the FA Cup final again the following year wearing the red-and-white home strip and were beaten by Leeds United. Arsenal then competed in three consecutive FA Cup finals between 1978 and 1980 wearing their "lucky" yellow and blue strip, which remained the club's away strip until the release of a green and navy away kit in 1982–83. The following season, Arsenal returned to the yellow and blue scheme, albeit with a darker shade of blue than before.

When Nike took over from Adidas as Arsenal's kit provider in 1994, Arsenal's away colours were again changed to two-tone blue shirts and shorts. Since the advent of the lucrative replica kit market, the away kits have been changed regularly, with Arsenal usually releasing both away and third choice kits. During this period the designs have been either all blue designs, or variations on the traditional yellow and blue, such as the metallic gold and navy strip used in the 2001–02 season, the yellow and dark grey used from 2005 to 2007, and the yellow and maroon of 2010 to 2013. Until 2014, the away kit was changed every season, and the outgoing away kit became the third-choice kit if a new home kit was being introduced in the same year.

After Puma began manufacturing Arsenal's kits in 2014, new home, away and third kits were released every season. In the 2017–18 season, Puma released a new colour scheme for the away and third kits. The away kit was a light blue, which faded to a darker blue near the bottom, while the third kit was black with red highlight. Puma returned to the original colour scheme for the 2018–19 season. From the 2019–20 season Arsenal's kits are manufactured by Adidas.

=== Kit suppliers and shirt sponsors ===
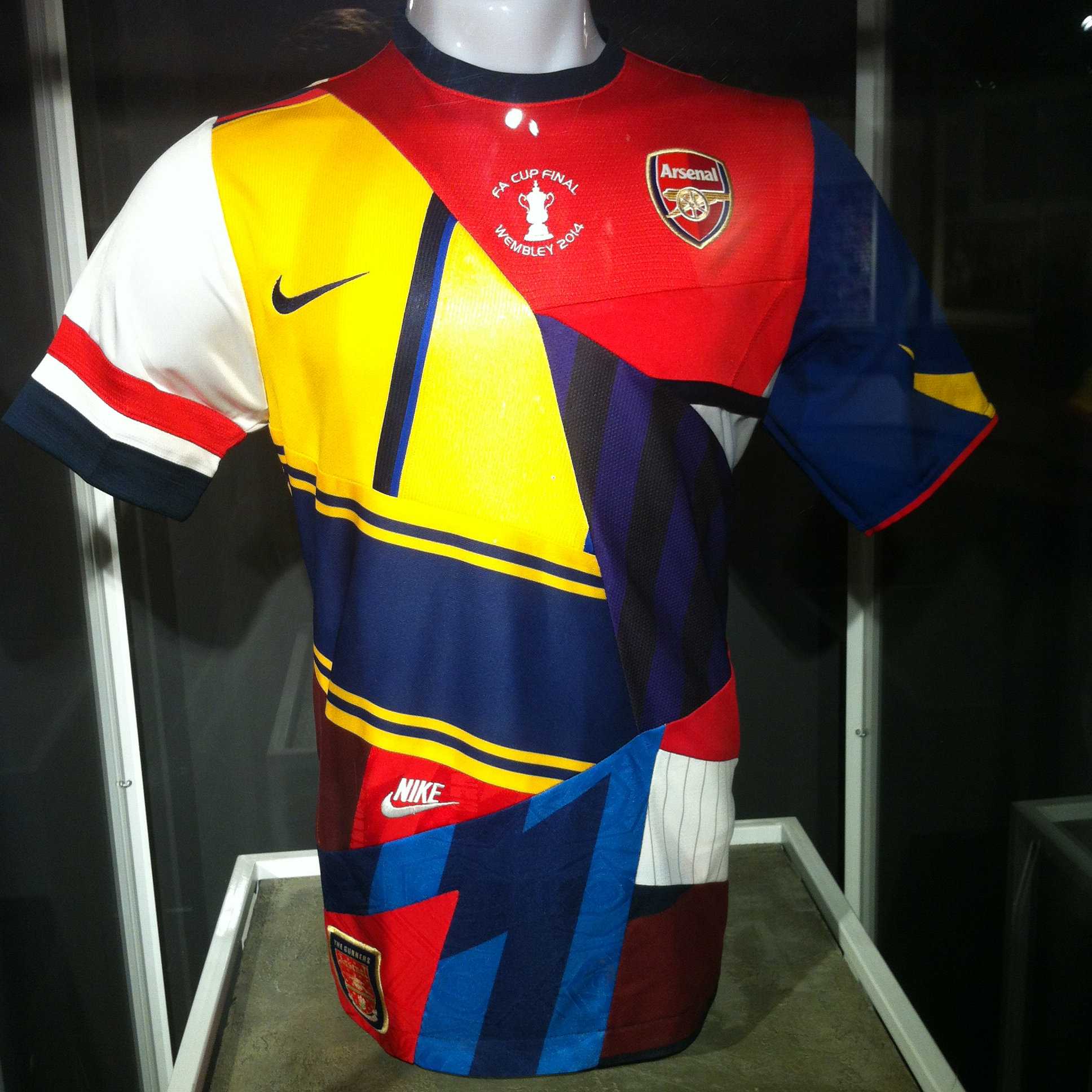
Arsenal mashup kit by Nike

Arsenal kit made by Puma for the 2016–17 season.

Arsenal kits
Period	Kit manufacturer	Shirt sponsor (chest)	Shirt sponsor (sleeve)
1886–1930	Unidentified	None	None
1930–1970	Bukta	None	None
1971–1981	Umbro	None	None
1981–1986	Umbro	JVC	None
1986–1994	Adidas	JVC	None
1994–1999	Nike	JVC	None
1999–2002	Nike	Dreamcast; Sega	None
2002–2006	Nike	O2	None
2006–2014	Nike	Emirates	None
2014–2018	Puma	Emirates	None
2018–2019	Puma	Emirates	Visit Rwanda
2019–2026	Adidas	Emirates	Visit Rwanda
2026–	Adidas	Emirates	Deel, Inc.

== Stadiums ==
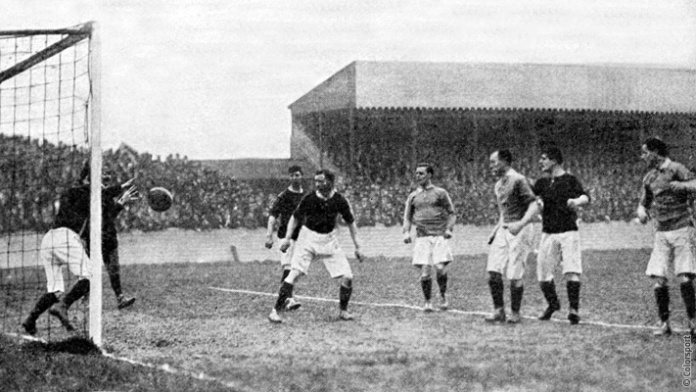
Manor Ground, Woolwich Arsenal vs. Everton

Before joining the Football League, Arsenal played briefly on Plumstead Common, then at the Manor Ground in Plumstead, then spent three years between 1890 and 1893 at the nearby Invicta Ground. Upon joining the Football League in 1893, the club returned to the Manor Ground and installed stands and terracing, upgrading it from just a field. Arsenal continued to play their home games there for the next twenty years (with two exceptions in the 1894–95 season), until the move to north London in 1913.

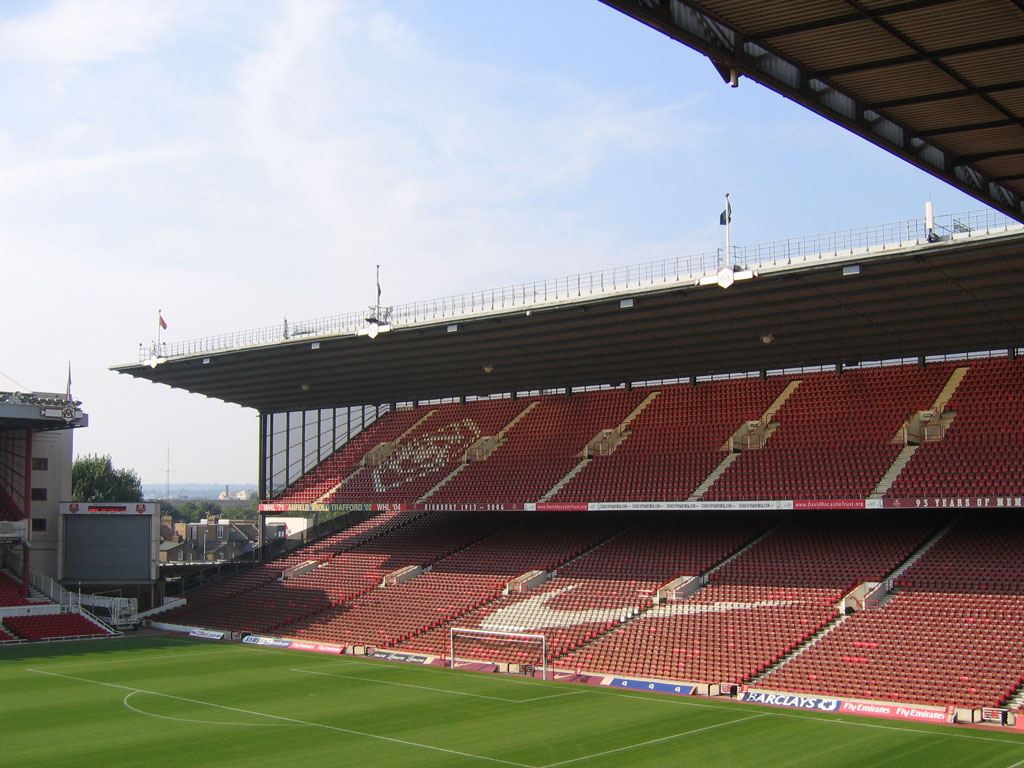
The North Bank Stand, Arsenal Stadium, Highbury

Widely referred to as Highbury, Arsenal Stadium was the club's home from September 1913 until May 2006. The original stadium was designed by the renowned football architect Archibald Leitch, and had a design common to many football grounds in the UK at the time, with a single covered stand and three open-air banks of terracing. The entire stadium was given a massive overhaul in the 1930s: new Art Deco West and East stands were constructed, opening in 1932 and 1936 respectively, and a roof was added to the North Bank terrace, which was bombed during the Second World War and not restored until 1954.

Highbury could hold more than 60,000 spectators at its peak, and had a capacity of 57,000 until the early 1990s. The Taylor Report and Premier League regulations obliged Arsenal to convert Highbury to an all-seater stadium in time for the 1993–94 season, thus reducing the capacity to 38,419 seated spectators. This capacity had to be reduced further during Champions League matches to accommodate additional advertising boards, so much so that for two seasons, from 1998 to 2000, Arsenal played Champions League home matches at Wembley, which could house more than 70,000 spectators.

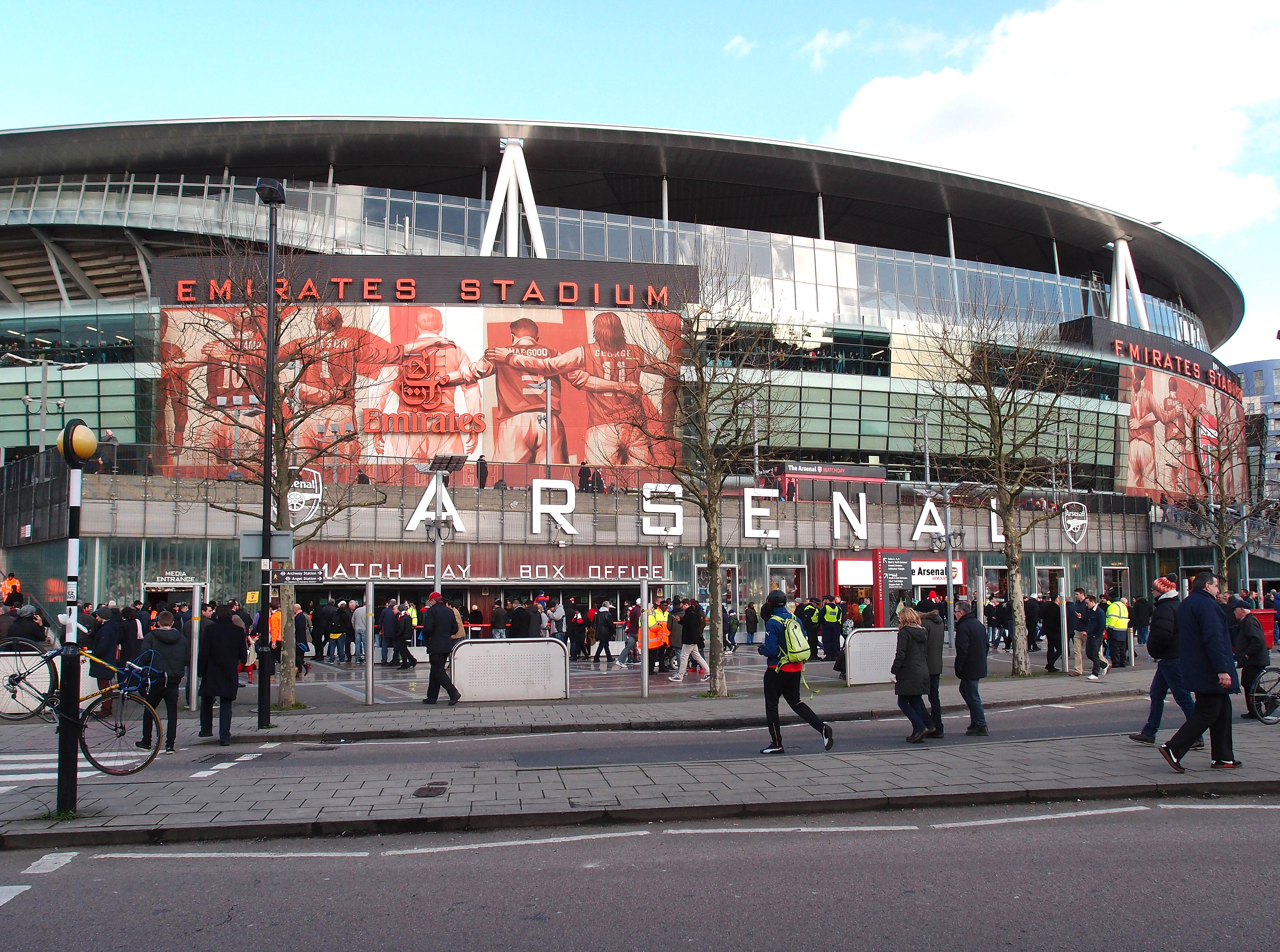
Emirates Stadium in 2016

Expansion of Highbury was restricted because the East Stand had been designated as a Grade II listed building and the other three stands were close to residential properties. These limitations prevented the club from maximising matchday revenue during the 1990s and first decade of the 21st century, putting them in danger of being left behind in the football boom of that time. After considering various options, in 2000 Arsenal proposed building a new 60,361-capacity stadium at Ashburton Grove, since named the Emirates Stadium, about 500 metres south-west of Highbury. The project was initially delayed by red tape and rising costs, and construction was completed in July 2006, in time for the start of the 2006–07 season. The stadium was named after its sponsors, the airline company Emirates, with whom the club signed the largest sponsorship deal in English football history, worth around £100 million. Some fans referred to the ground as Ashburton Grove, or the Grove, as they did not agree with corporate sponsorship of stadium names. The stadium will be officially known as Emirates Stadium until at least 2028, and the airline will be the club's shirt sponsor until at least 2024. From the start of the 2010–11 season on, the stands of the stadium have been officially known as North Bank, East Stand, West Stand and Clock end. The capacity of the Emirates now stands at 60,704.

Arsenal's players train at the Shenley Training Centre in Hertfordshire, a purpose-built facility which opened in 1999. Before that, the club used facilities on a nearby site owned by the University College of London Students' Union. Until 1961 they had trained at Highbury. Arsenal's Academy under-18 teams play their home matches at Shenley, while the reserves play their games at Meadow Park, which is also the home of Boreham Wood. Both the academy under-18 team and the reserves occasionally play their big games at the Emirates in front of a crowd reduced to only the lower west stand.

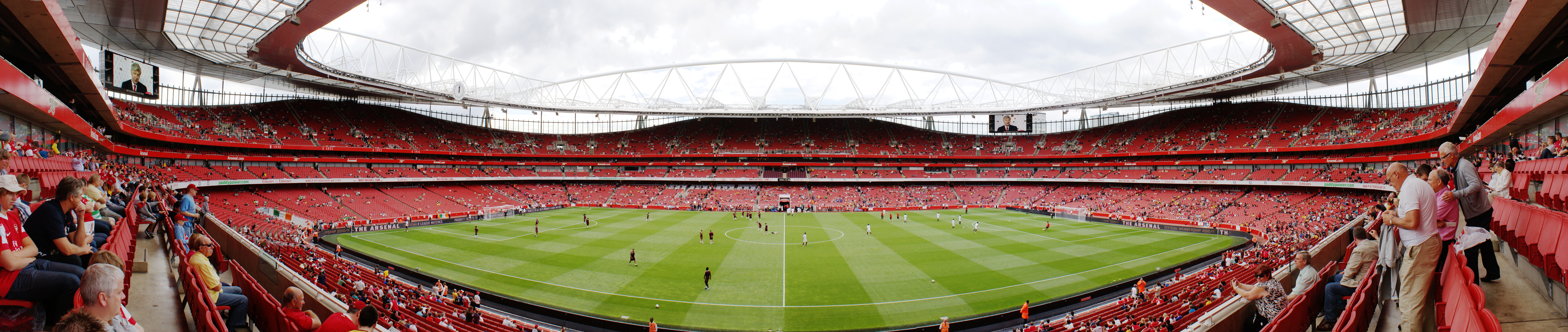
A panorama of the Emirates Stadium before a match

== Supporters and rivalries ==
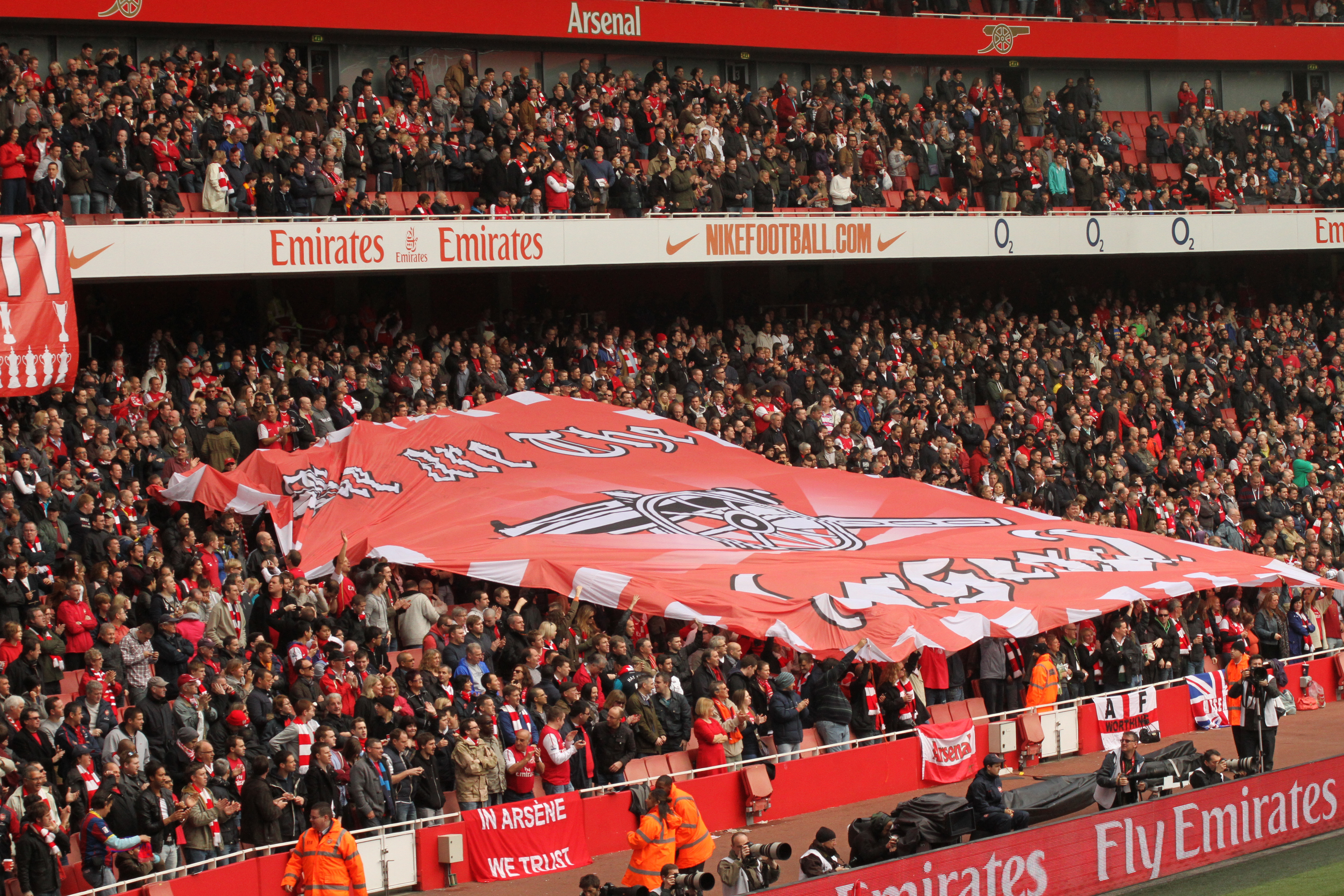
Arsenal supporters

Arsenal's fanbase are referred to as "Gooners" – the name derived from the club's nickname "The Gunners". Virtually all home matches sell out; in 2007–08 Arsenal had the second-highest average League attendance for an English club (60,070, which was 99.5% of available capacity), and, as of 2015, the third-highest all-time average attendance. In 2025 Arsenal had the fifth-highest average attendance of Premier League clubs. The club's location, adjoining wealthy areas such as Canonbury and Barnsbury, mixed areas such as Islington, Holloway, Highbury, and the adjacent London Borough of Camden, and largely working-class areas such as Finsbury Park and Stoke Newington, has meant that Arsenal's supporters have come from a variety of social classes. Much of the Afro-Caribbean support comes from the neighbouring London Borough of Hackney and a large portion of the South Asian Arsenal supporters commute to the stadium from Wembley Park, North West of the capital. There is also traditionally a large Irish community that followed Arsenal, with the surrounding Islington and particularly the nearby Archway area having a large community of residents with Irish heritage.

Like all major English football clubs, Arsenal have a number of domestic supporters' clubs, including the Arsenal Football Supporters' Club, which works closely with the club, and the Arsenal Independent Supporters' Association, which maintains a more independent line. The Arsenal Supporters' Trust promotes greater participation in ownership of the club by fans. The club's supporters also publish fanzines such as The Gooner, Gunflash and the satirical Up The Arse!.

Arsenal supporters in Uganda

There have always been Arsenal supporters outside London, and since the advent of satellite television, a supporter's attachment to a football club has become less dependent on geography. Consequently, Arsenal have a significant number of fans from beyond London and all over the world; in 2007, 24 UK, 37 Irish and 49 other overseas supporters' clubs were affiliated with the club. A 2011 report by SPORT+MARKT estimated Arsenal's global fanbase at 113 million. The club is especially popular in Africa, owing to many of its players, past and present, such as those from the Wenger era, coming from Africa or being descendants from west Africa and the Caribbean. As a homage to this support, the 2024–25 alternative away kit used black, red and green to refer to the pan-African flag. In 2025 the club's social media activity was the fifth-highest among English football clubs.

=== Chants ===
The team's anthem is "The Angel (North London Forever)" by Louis Dunford. and it is played before every Arsenal home game at the Emirates Stadium.

In addition to the usual English football chants, Arsenal's supporters sing "Freed from Desire" by Gala, "One-Nil to the Arsenal" (to the tune of "Go West") and also regularly sing "Who's that team they call the Arsenal", "Good Old Arsenal" (to the tune of "Rule, Britannia!") and "We're the North Bank/Clock End Highbury". The fans also chant "Boring, Boring Arsenal" in self-deprecating reference to Arsenal's reputation during the 1970s and 1980s as an overly defensive, cautious team.

=== Rivalries ===
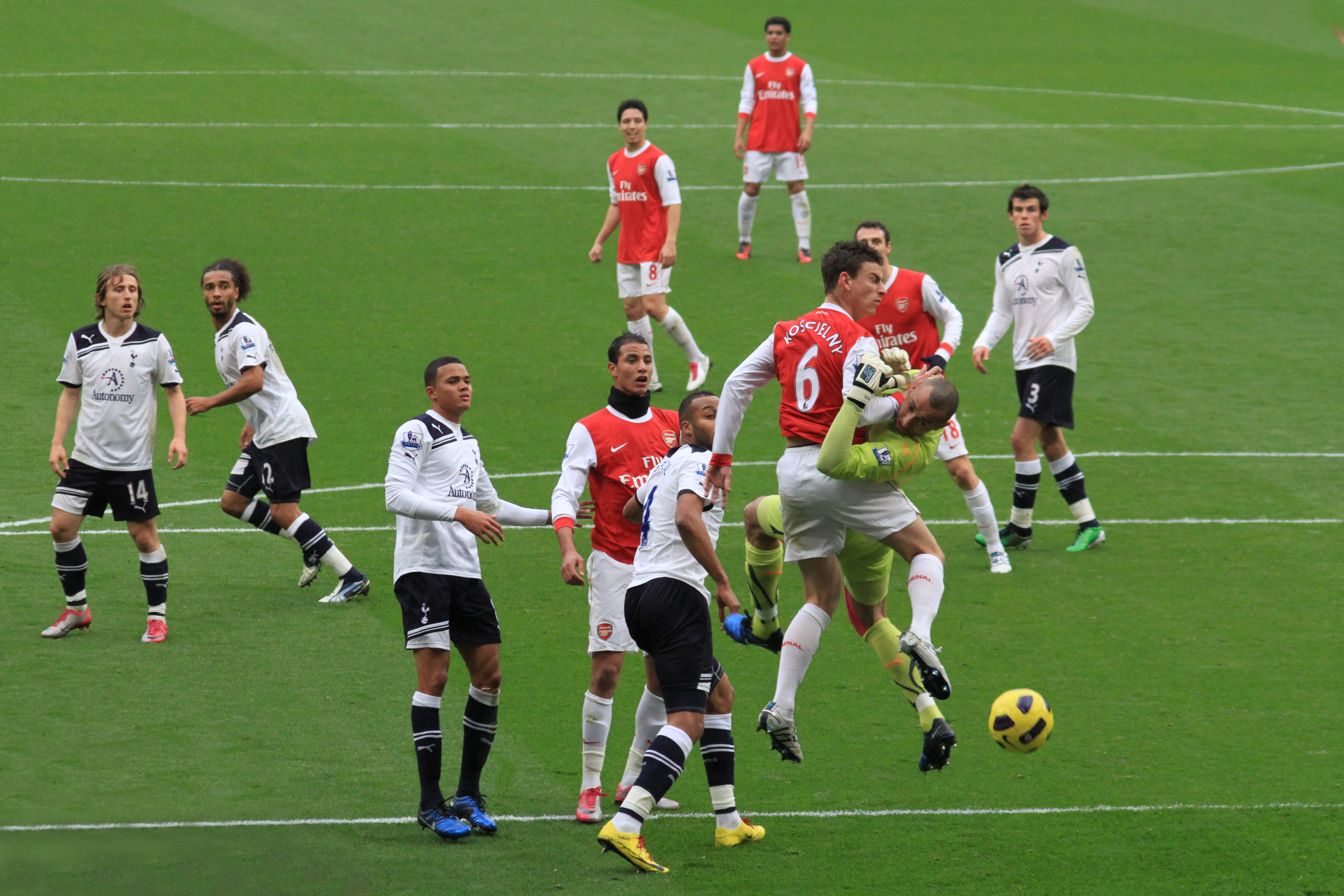
Arsenal playing against rivals Tottenham, in a game known as the North London derby, in November 2010

Arsenal's longest-running and deepest rivalry is with their nearest major neighbour, Tottenham Hotspur; matches between the two are referred to as the North London derby. There also exists a rivalry between Arsenal and Chelsea. In addition, Arsenal and Manchester United developed a strong on-pitch rivalry in the late 1980s, which intensified in the early 2000s when both clubs were competing for the Premier League title.

== Mascot ==
Gunnersaurus, the club official mascot since 1994

The club mascot is Gunnersaurus Rex, a smiling, seven-foot-tall green dinosaur, who first appeared at a home match against Manchester City in 20 August 1994. He is based on a drawing by then-11-year-old Peter Lovell, whose design and another similar idea won a Junior Gunners contest; his official backstory is that he hatched from an egg found during renovations at Highbury.

The same performer, Jerry Quy, has been inside the suit from the start; in early October 2020, as part of cost-cutting brought about by the COVID-19 pandemic, the club made him redundant from that and his other part-time job in supporter liaison, together with 55 full-time employees, although they later said Gunnersaurus could return after spectators were allowed back in stadiums. An online fundraiser was begun for Quy, and Mesut Özil offered to pay his salary himself as long as he remains with Arsenal. In November 2020, in advance of COVID-19 regulations being relaxed to allow supporters to attend home games from 3 December, Arsenal announced that Gunnersaurus would return, to be played by a roster of people that could include Quy if he wished.

== Ownership and finances ==
The largest shareholder on the Arsenal board is American sports tycoon Stan Kroenke. Kroenke first launched a bid for the club in April 2007, and faced competition for shares from Red and White Securities, which acquired its first shares from David Dein in August 2007. Red & White Securities was co-owned by Russian billionaire Alisher Usmanov and London-based Iranian financier Farhad Moshiri, though Usmanov bought Moshiri's stake in 2016. Kroenke came close to the 30% takeover threshold in November 2009, when he increased his holding to 18,594 shares (29.9%). In April 2011, Kroenke achieved a full takeover by purchasing the shareholdings of Nina Bracewell-Smith and Danny Fiszman, taking his shareholding to 62.89%. In May 2017, Kroenke owned 41,721 shares (67.05%) and Red & White Securities owned 18,695 shares (30.04%). In January 2018, Kroenke expanded his ownership by buying twenty-two more shares, taking his total ownership to 67.09%. In August 2018, Kroenke bought out Usmanov for £550m. Now owning more than 90% of the shares, he had the required stake to complete the buyout of the remaining shares and become the sole owner. There has been criticism of Arsenal's poor performance since Kroenke took over, which has been attributed to his ownership. Ivan Gazidis was the club's Chief executive from 2009 to 2018.

Arsenal's parent company, Arsenal Holdings plc, operates as an unlisted public limited company, whose ownership is considerably different from that of other football clubs. Only 62,219 shares in Arsenal have been issued, and they are not traded on a public exchange such as the FTSE or AIM; instead, they are traded relatively infrequently on the ICAP Securities and Derivatives Exchange, a specialist market. On 29 May 2017, a single share in Arsenal had a mid price of £18,000, which sets the club's market capitalisation value at approximately £1,119.9m. Most football clubs are not listed on an exchange, which makes direct comparisons of their values difficult. Consultants Brand Finance valued the club's brand and intangible assets at $703m in 2015, and consider Arsenal an AAA global brand. Business magazine Forbes valued Arsenal as a whole at $2.238 billion (£1.69 billion) in 2018, ranked third in English football. Research by the Henley Business School ranked Arsenal second in English football, modelling the club's value at £1.118 billion in 2015.

Arsenal's financial results for the 2019–20 season showed an after tax loss of £47.8m, due in part to the impact of the COVID-19 pandemic. The Deloitte Football Money League is a publication that homogenises and compares clubs' annual revenue. Deloitte put Arsenal's footballing revenue in 2019 at £392.7m (€445.6m), ranking Arsenal eleventh among world football clubs. Arsenal and Deloitte both listed the match day revenue generated in 2019 by the Emirates Stadium as €109.2m (£96.2m).

== In popular culture ==
Partly due to their proximity to the Alexandra Palace transmitter, Arsenal have appeared in a number of media "firsts". On 22 January 1927, their match at Highbury against Sheffield United was the first English League match to be broadcast live on radio. A decade later, on 16 September 1937, an exhibition match between Arsenal's first team and the reserves was the first football match in the world to be televised live. Arsenal also featured in the first edition of the BBC's Match of the Day, which screened highlights of their match against Liverpool at Anfield on 22 August 1964. Sky's coverage of Arsenal's January 2010 match against Manchester United was the first live public broadcast of a sports event on 3D television.

As one of the most successful teams in the country, Arsenal have often featured when football is depicted in the arts in Britain. They formed the backdrop to one of the earliest football-related novels, The Arsenal Stadium Mystery (1939), which was made into a film in the same year. The story centres on a friendly match between Arsenal and an amateur side, one of whose players is poisoned while playing. Many Arsenal players appeared as themselves in the film and manager George Allison was given a speaking part. The book Fever Pitch by Nick Hornby was an autobiographical account of Hornby's life and relationship with football, and with Arsenal in particular. Published in 1992, it formed part of the revival and rehabilitation of football in British society during the 1990s. The book was twice adapted for the cinema–the 1997 British film focuses on Arsenal's 1988–89 title win, and a 2005 American version features a fan of baseball's Boston Red Sox.

Arsenal have often been stereotyped as a defensive and "boring" side, especially during the 1970s and 1980s. In the 1997 film The Full Monty the principal characters move forward in a line and raise their hands, deliberately mimicking the Arsenal defence's offside trap, in an attempt to co-ordinate their striptease routine. Fifteen years later, an almost identical scene was included in the 2012 Disney science-fiction film John Carter (director and co-writer Andrew Stanton, a notable overseas supporter of the club), along with other visual cues and oblique dialogue hints and references to the club throughout the film. Another film reference to the club's defence comes in the film Plunkett & Macleane, in which two characters are named Dixon and Winterburn after Arsenal's long-serving full backs – the right-sided Lee Dixon and the left-sided Nigel Winterburn.

In August 2022, Amazon Prime Video released an eight-episode docuseries called All or Nothing: Arsenal. It documented the club by spending time with the coaching staff and players behind the scenes both on and off the field throughout their 2021–22 season, in which they were the youngest team in the Premier League with an average starting age of 24 years and 308 days – more than a whole year younger than the next team.

== In the community ==
In 1985, Arsenal founded a community scheme, "Arsenal in the Community", which offered sporting, social inclusion, educational and charitable projects. The club support a number of charitable causes directly and in 1992 established The Arsenal Charitable Trust, which by 2006 had raised more than £2 million for local causes. An ex-professional and celebrity football team associated with the club also raised money by playing charity matches. The club launched the Arsenal for Everyone initiative in 2008 as an annual celebration of the diversity of the Arsenal family. In the 2009–10 season Arsenal announced that they had raised a record breaking £818,897 for the Great Ormond Street Hospital Children's Charity. The original target was £500,000. In 2022, Arsenal and Adidas partnered up to launch the "No More Red" campaign to support the long-standing work being done by Arsenal in the Community to help keep young people safe from knife crime and youth violence. To promote the event, the club launched an exclusive all white kit that was not commercially available and only awarded to individuals who are making a positive difference in the community.

Save the Children has been Arsenal global charity partner since 2011 and have worked together in numerous projects to improve safety and well-being for vulnerable children in London and abroad. On 3 September 2016 The Arsenal Foundation has donated £1m to build football pitches for children in London, Indonesia, Iraq, Jordan and Somalia thanks to The Arsenal Foundation Legends Match against Milan Glorie at the Emirates Stadium. On 3 June 2018, Arsenal played Real Madrid in the Corazon Classic Match 2018 at the Bernabeu, where the proceeds went to Realtoo Real Madrid Foundation projects that are aimed at the most vulnerable children. In addition there will be a return meeting on 8 September 2018 at the Emirates stadium where proceeds will go towards the Arsenal foundation.

During 2007 in Pleiku, Vietnam, Arsenal partnered with the JMG Academy and the Hoang Anh Gia Lai Corporation to found a youth academy for the V.League 1 side Hoàng Anh Gia Lai, which saw a selection of Vietnam-based players train with Arsenal; the club ended their partnership with the club in 2017. Additionally, the club formally partnered with a variety of clubs overseas including Virginia based Richmond Strikers and Cairo based Wadi Degla.

== Players ==
=== First-team squad ===
As of 3 September 2026

Note: Flags indicate national team as defined under FIFA eligibility rules; some limited exceptions apply. Players may hold more than one non-FIFA nationality.

No.	Pos.	Nation	Player
1	GK	ESP	David Raya
2	DF	FRA	William Saliba
3	DF	ESP	Cristhian Mosquera
4	DF	ENG	Ben White
5	DF	ECU	Piero Hincapié
6	DF	BRA	Gabriel Magalhães
7	FW	ENG	Bukayo Saka (vice-captain)
8	MF	NOR	Martin Ødegaard (captain)
10	MF	ENG	Eberechi Eze
12	DF	NED	Jurriën Timber
13	GK	ESP	Kepa Arrizabalaga
14	FW	SWE	Viktor Gyökeres

No.	Pos.	Nation	Player
15	DF	ENG	Ezri Konsa
17	FW	GRE	Christos Tzolis
20	FW	ENG	Noni Madueke
23	MF	ESP	Mikel Merino
29	FW	GER	Kai Havertz
30	GK	FRA	Illan Meslier
33	DF	ITA	Riccardo Calafiori
36	MF	ESP	Martín Zubimendi
39	MF	BRA	Bruno Guimarães
41	MF	ENG	Declan Rice
49	DF	ENG	Myles Lewis-Skelly

Out on loan

Note: Flags indicate national team as defined under FIFA eligibility rules; some limited exceptions apply. Players may hold more than one non-FIFA nationality.

No.	Pos.	Nation	Player
22	FW	ENG	Ethan Nwaneri (on loan to Borussia Dortmund until 30 June 2027)
35	GK	ENG	Tommy Setford (on loan to Stevenage until 30 June 2027)

=== Under-21s and Academy ===
As of 27 October 2026

Players with at least one first-team appearance for Arsenal.

Note: Flags indicate national team as defined under FIFA eligibility rules; some limited exceptions apply. Players may hold more than one non-FIFA nationality.

No.	Pos.	Nation	Player
40	DF	ENG	Jaden Dixon
43	FW	ENG	Andre Harriman-Annous
44	MF	ENG	Ife Ibrahim
45	MF	ENG	Theo Julienne
53	FW	NIR	Ceadach O'Neill

No.	Pos.	Nation	Player
55	GK	ENG	Jack Porter
56	FW	ENG	Max Dowman
71	FW	ENG	Brando Bailey-Joseph
89	DF	ENG	Marli Salmon

Out on loan

Note: Flags indicate national team as defined under FIFA eligibility rules; some limited exceptions apply. Players may hold more than one non-FIFA nationality.

No.	Pos.	Nation	Player
46	FW	NED	Ismeal Kabia (on loan to St Mirren until 30 June 2027)
58	FW	ENG	Charles Sagoe Jr (on loan to Kalmar until 31 December 2026)

== Management and staff ==
=== Current staff ===
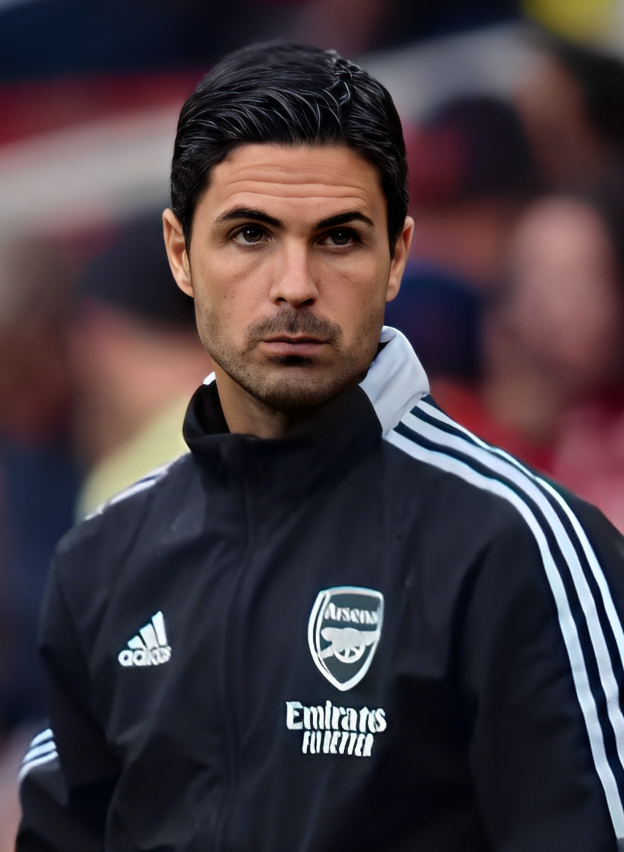
Having served as Arsenal's club captain during his playing career, Arteta was appointed as manager in December 2019.

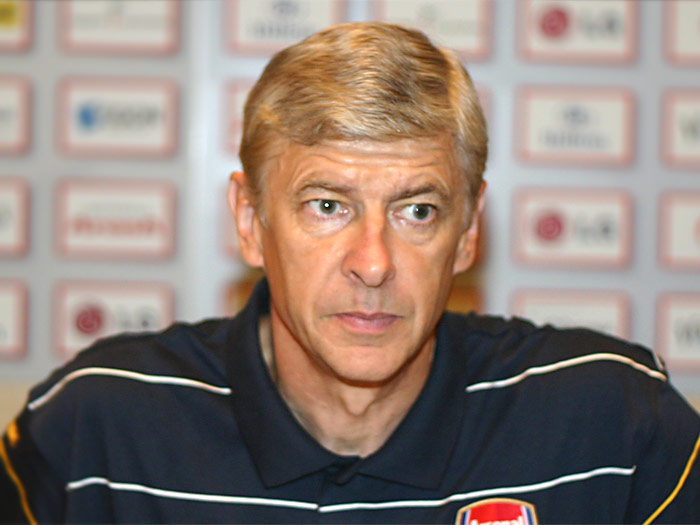
Arsène Wenger managed Arsenal from 1996 to 2018; he is the club's longest serving and most successful manager.

Management and staff as of 3 July 2026
Position	Name
Manager	(Spain) Mikel Arteta
Assistant manager	(Netherlands) Albert Stuivenberg
Assistant manager	(Spain) Miguel Molina
First team coach	(Argentina) Gabriel Heinze
Set-piece coach	(Germany) (France) Nicolas Jover
Goalkeeper coach	(Spain) Iñaki Caña
Assistant goalkeeper coach	(England) Terry Mason
Throw-in coach	(Denmark) Thomas Grønnemark
Academy director	(Belgium) Pascal De Maesschalck
Head of analysis	(England) Ben Chadwick
Performance analyst	(England) Jordan Nathan
Doctor	(England) Florence Newton
Physiotherapist	(England) Simon Murphy
Head of sports science and performance	(England) Tom Allen
Head of medical services	(Portugal) Arnaldo Abrantes
Lead first team strength & conditioning coach	(Republic of Ireland) Eoin Clarkin
Senior physical performance coach	(Spain) José Jiménez
Head of performance	(Spain) Antonio Gómez
Lead physical performance coach	(England) Sam Wilson
Physical performance coach	(England) Toby Griffiths
Fitness coach	(Spain) Izan Martín
Attacking phase coach	(England) Isa Hussein
Talent scout	(England) Tom Cooper
Kit manager	(England) Dennis Rockall
Assistant kit manager	(England) David Walter

=== Arsenal board ===
Arsenal board as of 19 September 2025
Position	Name
Co-chairman	(United States) Stan Kroenke
Co-chairman	(United States) Josh Kroenke
Director	(England) Lord Harris of Peckham
Non-Executive Directors	(United States) Kelly Blaha
Non-Executive Directors	(United States) Otto Maly
Non-Executive Directors	(United States) Dave Steiner
Non-Executive Directors	(England) Ben Winston
Sporting Director	(Italy) Andrea Berta
Chief Executive Officer	(England) Richard Garlick
Chief Commercial Officer	(England) Juliet Slot
Chief Financial Officer	(England) Stuart Wisely
Director of Football Operations	(England) James King

== Statistics and records ==
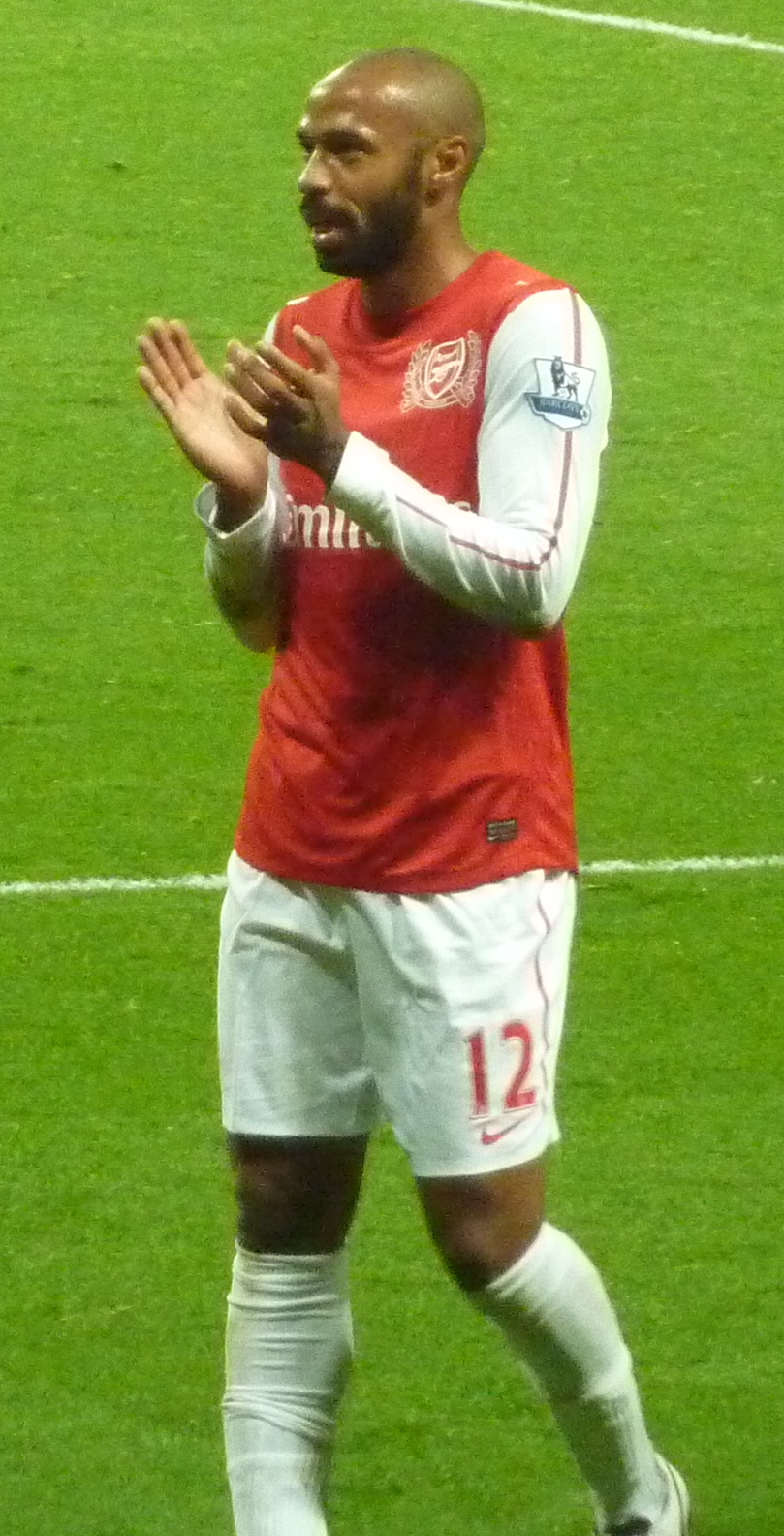
Thierry Henry is Arsenal's record goalscorer, with 228 goals in all competitions.

Arsenal's tally of 14 League Championships is the third highest in English football, after Liverpool (20) and Manchester United (20), and they were the first club to reach a seventh and an eighth League Championship. As of June 2020, they are one of seven teams, the others being Manchester United, Blackburn Rovers, Chelsea, Manchester City, Leicester City and Liverpool, to have won the Premier League since its formation in 1992.

They hold the highest number of FA Cup trophies, with 14. The club is one of only six clubs to have won the FA Cup twice in succession, in 2002 and 2003, and 2014 and 2015. Arsenal have achieved three League and FA Cup "Doubles" (in 1971, 1998 and 2002), a feat only previously achieved by Manchester United (in 1994, 1996 and 1999). They were the first side in English football to complete the FA Cup and League Cup double, in 1993. Arsenal were also the first London club to reach the final of the UEFA Champions League, in 2006, losing the final 2–1 to Barcelona and they lost the Champions League final again, in 2026, 3-4 on penalties against Paris Saint-Germain, after a 1-1 draw.

Arsenal have one of the best top-flight records in history, having finished below fourteenth only seven times. They have won the second most top flight league matches in English football, and have also accumulated the second most points, whether calculated by two points per win or by the contemporary points value. They have been in the top flight for the most consecutive seasons (98 as of 2023–24). Arsenal also have the highest average league finishing position for the 20th century, with an average league placement of 8.5.

Arsenal hold the record for the longest run of unbeaten League matches (49 between May 2003 and October 2004). This included all 38 matches of their title-winning 2003–04 season, when Arsenal became only the second club to finish a top-flight campaign unbeaten, after Preston North End (who played only 22 matches) in 1888–89. They also hold the record for the longest top flight win streak. Arsenal set a Champions League record during the 2005–06 season by going ten matches without conceding a goal, beating the previous best of seven set by AC Milan. They went a record total stretch of 995 minutes without letting an opponent score; the streak ended in the final, when Samuel Eto'o scored a 76th-minute equaliser for Barcelona.

David O'Leary holds the record for Arsenal appearances, having played 722 first-team matches between 1975 and 1993. Fellow centre half and former captain Tony Adams comes second, having played 669 times. The record for a goalkeeper is held by David Seaman, with 564 appearances. Thierry Henry is the club's top goalscorer with 228 goals in all competitions between 1999 and 2012; he surpassed Ian Wright's total of 185 in October 2005. Wright's record had stood since September 1997, when he overtook the longstanding total of 178 goals set by winger Cliff Bastin in 1939. Henry also holds the club record for goals scored in the League, with 175, a record that had been held by Bastin until February 2006. Declan Rice holds the Arsenal record signing price after a deal with West Ham United was completed in July 2023, for an initial £100 million. This easily surpassed the former record of £72 million for Nicolas Pepe.

Arsenal's record home attendance is 73,707, for a UEFA Champions League match against Lens on 25 November 1998 at Wembley, where the club formerly played home European matches because of the limits on Highbury's capacity. The record attendance for an Arsenal match at Highbury is 73,295, for a 0–0 draw against Sunderland on 9 March 1935, while that at Emirates Stadium is 60,161, for a 2–2 draw with Manchester United on 3 November 2007.

Chart showing Arsenal's league positions since admission to the Football League in 1893

== Honours ==
Arsenal's first ever silverware was won as the Royal Arsenal in 1890. The Kent Junior Cup, won by Royal Arsenal's reserves, was the club's first trophy, while the first team's first trophy came three weeks later when they won the Kent Senior Cup. Their first national senior honour came in 1930, when they won the FA Cup. The club enjoyed further success in the 1930s, winning another FA Cup and five Football League First Division titles. Arsenal won their first league and cup double in the 1970–71 season and twice repeated the feat, in 1997–98 and 2001–02, as well as winning a cup double of the FA Cup and League Cup in 1992–93. The 2003–04 season was the only 38-match league season unbeaten in English football history. A special gold version of the Premier League trophy was commissioned and presented to the club the following season.

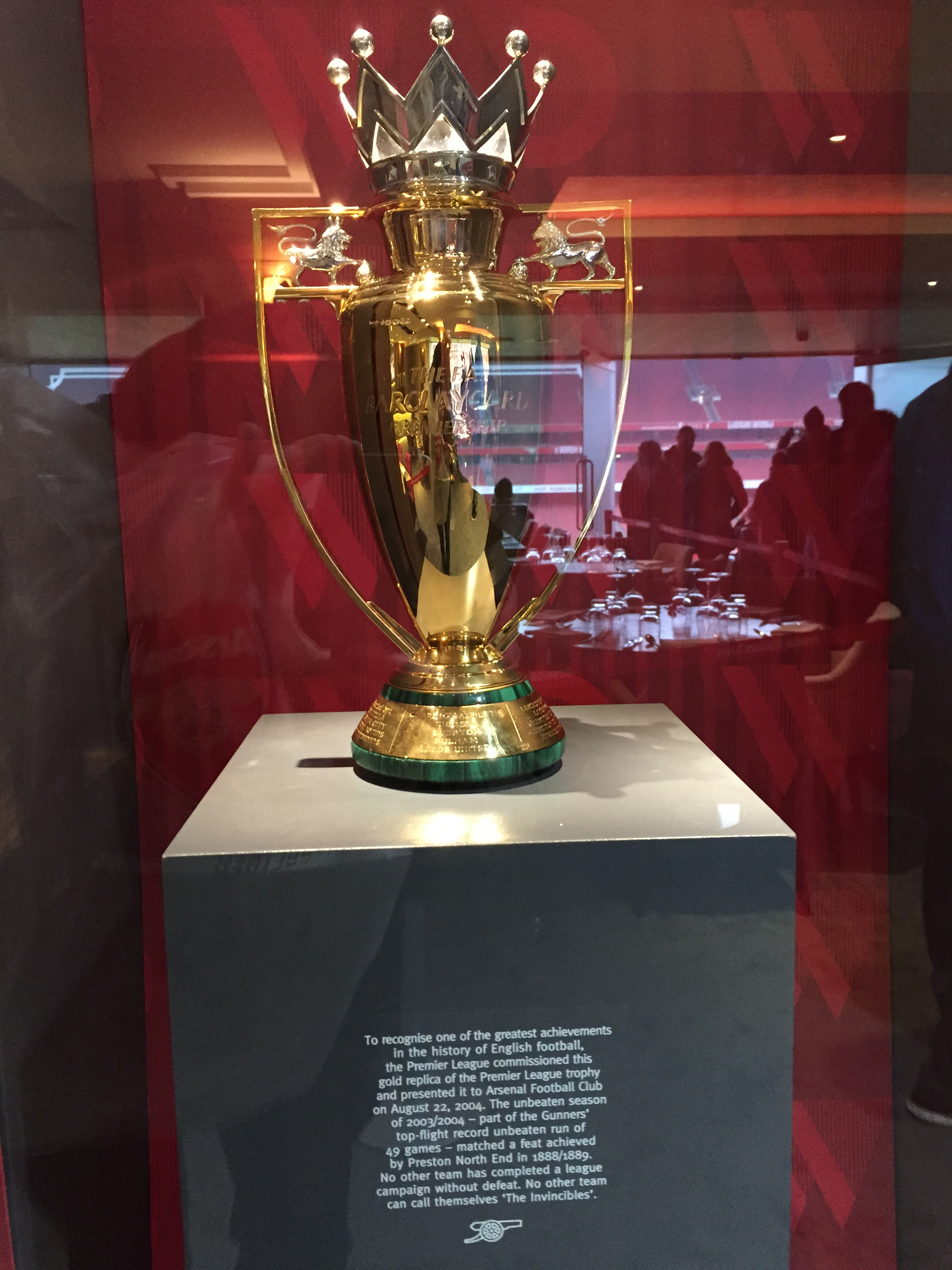
After completing the only unbeaten Premier League season, a unique gold trophy was commissioned to Arsenal.

Arsenal F.C. honours
Type	Competition	Titles	Seasons
Domestic	First Division/Premier League (Note: Upon its formation in 1992, the Premier League became the top tier of English football; the Football League First and Second Divisions then became the second and third tiers, respectively. From 2004, the First Division became the Championship and the Second Division became League One.)	14	1930–31, 1932–33, 1933–34, 1934–35, 1937–38, 1947–48, 1952–53, 1970–71, 1988–89, 1990–91, 1997–98, 2001–02, 2003–04, 2025–26
Domestic	FA Cup	14	1929–30, 1935–36, 1949–50, 1970–71, 1978–79, 1992–93, 1997–98, 2001–02, 2002–03, 2004–05, 2013–14, 2014–15, 2016–17, 2019–20
Domestic	EFL Cup (Note: Until 2016, the unsponsored name of the EFL Cup was the Football League Cup.)	2	1986–87, 1992–93
Domestic	FA Community Shield (Note: Until 2002, the FA Community Shield was known as the FA Charity Shield.)	18	1930, 1931, 1933, 1934, 1938, 1948, 1953, 1991, (Note: The 1991 FA Charity Shield was shared with Tottenham Hotspur.) 1998, 1999, 2002, 2004, 2014, 2015, 2017, 2020, 2023, 2026
Domestic	Football League Centenary Trophy	1	1988
Continental	UEFA Cup Winners' Cup	1	1993–94
Continental	Inter-Cities Fairs Cup	1	1969–70

- record
- ^{s} shared record

=== Other ===
When the FA Cup was the only national football association competition available to Arsenal, the other football association competitions were County Cups, and they made up many of the matches the club played during a season. Arsenal's first first-team trophy was a County Cup, the inaugural Kent Senior Cup. Arsenal became ineligible for the London Cups when the club turned professional in 1891, and rarely participated in County Cups after this. Due to the club's original location within the borders of both the London and Kent Football Associations, Arsenal competed in and won trophies organised by each.

During Arsenal's history, the club has participated in and won a variety of pre-season and friendly honours. These include Arsenal's own pre-season competition the Emirates Cup, begun in 2007. During the wars, previous competitions were widely suspended and the club had to participate in wartime competitions. During WWII, Arsenal won several of these.
