= Miranda Miller =

Miranda Miller may refer to:

- Miranda Miller (novelist) (born 1950), English novelist
- Miranda Miller (cyclist) (born 1990), Canadian downhill mountain biker
