= Patrick Wright (historian) =

British writer, broadcaster and academic

Patrick Wright FBA FRSL is a British writer, broadcaster and academic in the fields of cultural studies and cultural history. He was educated at the University of Kent and Simon Fraser University in British Columbia, Canada.

He is Professor (emeritus) of Literature, History and Politics at King's College London, having previously worked at the Institute of Cultural Analysis of Nottingham Trent University, and as a fellow of the London Consortium. In the 1980s he worked for the National Council for Voluntary Organisations in London, and was self-employed as a writer, broadcaster and occasional consultant between 1987 and 2000. He has written for many journals and newspapers, including The Guardian, where he was a contracted feature writer in the early 1990s. More recently, he has held a Mellon Fellowship at Tate Britain and, together with Timothy Hyman, curated a major Stanley Spencer exhibition. He presented a BBC2 series The River, about the River Thames, in 1999. Patrick Wright is a former presenter of Radio 3's arts programme Night Waves. He is also known for his work on British heritage.

He is the author of several books, many of which explore themes connected to England and Englishness, Psychogeography and cultural history, including The Village That Died for England and A Journey through Ruins: The Last Days of London.

== Honours and recognition ==
Wright was elected a Fellow of the British Academy in 2016 and of the Royal Society of Literature in 2025.

== Bibliography ==
- On Living in an Old Country: The National Past in Contemporary Britain. Verso Books. 1986. ISBN 978-0860918332.
- A Journey Through Ruins: The Last Days of London. Radius Books. 1991. ISBN 978-0091731908.
- The Village That Died for England: The strange story of Tyneham. Jonathan Cape. 1995. ISBN 978-0224038867.
- The River: The Thames in Our Time. BBC Books. 1999. ISBN 978-0563384786.
- Hyman, Timothy; Wright, Patrick (2001). Stanley Spencer. Tate Publishing. ISBN 978-1854373779.
- Tank: The Progress of a Monstrous War Machine. Viking Press. 2002. ISBN 978-0670030705.
- Iron Curtain: From Stage to Cold War. Oxford University Press. 2007. ISBN 978-0199231508.
- Passport to Peking: A Very British Mission to Mao's China. Oxford University Press. 2010. ISBN 978-0199541935.)
- The Sea View Has Me Again: Uwe Johnson in Sheerness. Repeater Books. 2020. ISBN 9781912248605.
