= Anthony Hyman =

British writer and broadcaster

- Born: 17 April 1946
- Died: 19 December 1999 (aged 53)
- Resting place: Brompton Cemetery, London, England
- Education: School of Oriental and African Studies
- Occupations: Writer, broadcaster
- Spouse: Hilary Hyman
- Parent: Alan Hyman (father)
- Relatives: Miranda Miller (sister); Timothy Hyman (rother)
- Writing career
- Notable works: Afghanistan Under Soviet Domination, 1964–81 (1982).

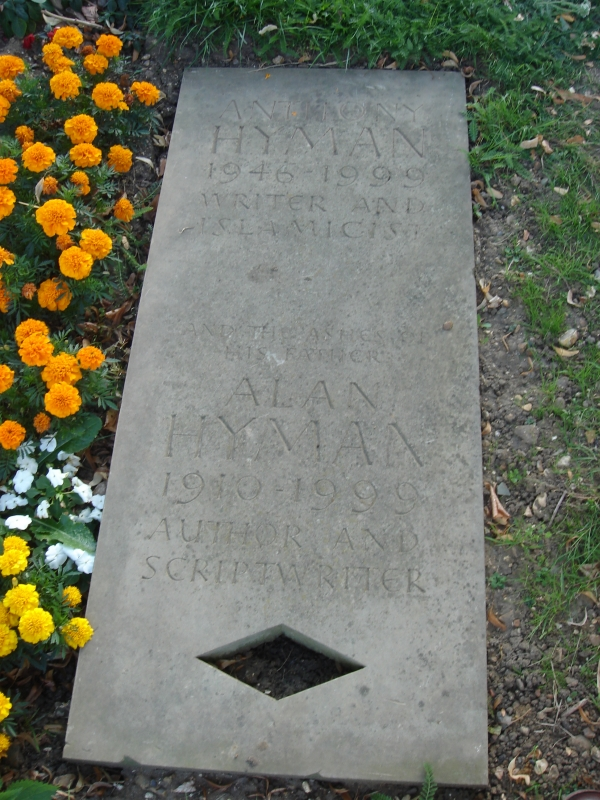
Funerary monument with his father Alan Hyman at the Brompton Cemetery, London

Anthony Hyman (17 April 1946 – 19 December 1999) was a British academic, writer, broadcaster, and Islamicist.

Anthony Hyman was a son of the author, journalist, and film writer Alan Hyman (1910–1999). His siblings were the author Miranda Miller, the artist Timothy Hyman, and Nicholas Hyman.

Hyman was a student at the London School of Oriental and African Studies, where he became interested in the Muslim world. He became an expert on Afghanistan, Iran, Pakistan, and Central Asia, and was a commentator for the BBC World Service for more than twenty years He was a linguist, historian, bibliophile, art lover, and traveller. His early work was on the development of Pan-Islamism in early 20th century India, out of which grew his interest in Pakistan and the wider Islamic world. He studied the Persian language and followed Afghan and Iranian politics closely.

In 1982, soon after Afghanistan increased its importance in global politics, Hyman's work, Afghanistan under Soviet Domination, was first published. His knowledge of the Afghan resistance's struggle against the Soviet Union during the Soviet-Afghan War challenged the traditional view of Afghan society and its process of radicalisation. He was concerned about the disintegration of Afghan unity under pressure from tribalism and sectarianism. In later years, he was particularly critical of the Taliban and of what he saw as their narrow vision of Afghanistan's future.

In the early 1980s, Hyman was also secretary of the Afghanistan Support Committee and worked with the Afghan Refugee Network and with Amnesty International. After the collapse of the Soviet Union, Hyman became absorbed with Central Asia, travelling there, learning Russian, acquainting himself with the politics and cultures of the new states and introducing these countries to a wider audience through his writings. As with Afghanistan, he advocated a higher-profile European interest in these countries and their needs. He was a founding director of the charity Links, which worked to resolve conflict and promoted democracy in the region in the early years of transition.

Hyman was at various times a research associate of the Royal Institute of International Affairs at Chatham House, a senior fellow of the MacArthur Foundation in New York and a visiting fellow of Queen Elizabeth House at Oxford University. He was also associate editor of the journal Central Asian Survey.

A Memorial Lecture was set up at SOAS, University of London, in 2002 and has run annually since that time. Its aim is to encourage discussion and debate about Afghanistan and its neighbours.

== Selected publications ==
Hyman published the following books among others:

- Hyman, Anthony (1982). Afghanistan Under Soviet Domination, 1964–81. New York: St. Martin's Press. ISBN 978-0-312-00926-7.
- ——; Ghayur, Muhammed; Kaushik, Naresh (1989). Pakistan, Zia and After--. New Delhi: Abhinav Publications. ISBN 81-7017-253-5.
- —— (1994). Political Change in Post-Soviet Central Asia. London: Royal Institute of International Affairs. OCLC 481153860.
