= Thomas Grønnemark =

Danish football coach

Personal information
- Date of birth: 12 December 1975 (age 50)
- Height: 1.83 m (6 ft 0 in)

Team information
- Current team: Arsenal (throw-in coach)

Thomas Grønnemark (born 12 December 1975) is a Danish professional football coach and former athlete and bobsledder who is currently the throw-in coach of Premier League club Arsenal.

Prior to football, Grønnemark was a track and field athlete competing as a sprinter and was a member of the Danish athletics and bobsleigh teams. He held the Guinness World Record for the longest throw-in.

Grønnemark moved to football in 2004 and has worked as a throw-in coach for a number of teams, including Viborg, Midtjylland, Silkeborg, Horsens and Brentford; he also worked as a coach for Liverpool between 2018 and 2023.
