= Arsenal Football Club v Reed =

Trademark case in English law

Arsenal Football Club v Matthew Reed is a trademark infringement case in English law concerning the sale of unlicensed merchandise bearing the Arsenal Football Club trademarks. The case revolved around Matthew Reed, who for approximately 30 years sold souvenirs near Arsenal's Highbury Stadium, some of which bore the club's registered trademarks. Arsenal FC initiated legal proceedings against Reed, alleging trademark infringement and passing off. The case ultimately reached the European Court of Justice (ECJ), which considered the implications of third-party use on the essential function of a trademark. The ECJ emphasized this "essential function" as guaranteeing the origin of goods, clarifying that even if a mark was perceived as a "badge of support" rather than an indicator of origin, its unauthorized use could still infringe if it jeopardized this guarantee. This was a significant development, broadening trademark protection beyond mere confusion of origin.

The ECJ clarified that the fact that a mark was primarily seen as a symbol of support did not automatically preclude infringement if its use, even in this context, affected the trademark owner's control over the origin of the goods. This ruling had a significant impact on the sale of unofficial merchandise, making it more difficult to sell items bearing registered trademarks, even with disclaimers, if that use could still affect the trademark's guarantee of origin. While the ECJ ruling provided guidance, its application within English law proved complex, involving subsequent appeals and interpretations. Ultimately, the English Court of Appeal upheld the principle that even use as a badge of allegiance could infringe if it impacted the essential function of the trademark, solidifying the ECJ's emphasis on protecting the guarantee of origin. The Arsenal v. Reed case remains a crucial precedent in trademark law, particularly concerning the balance between protecting trademark owners' rights and allowing the use of marks as expressions of support or affiliation.

== Summary ==
Arsenal FC is a football club, which owns registered trademarks. Matthew Reed had sold souvenirs bearing the registered trademarks of the Arsenal FC. In January 1999 Arsenal Football Club Plc started proceedings against Matthew Reed. They elected that Reed had infringed certain of the registered trademarks and had carried out acts of passing off. The European Court of Justice had considered whether the third party use affected, or was likely to affect, the essential function of the mark, and had found the third party use of the registered trademarks was liable to have an effect on the functions of the registered trademark.

== Legal issue ==
Arsenal FC is a well known football club which was founded in 1886. The club generated revenues of £381.7 million in the business year which ended 31 May 2010, inter alia by selling merchandising products. Arsenal FC owns UK trademark registrations for the word "Arsenal", registered trademark number 1383343, for the Arsenal Cannon device, registered trademark number 1387461, for the Arsenal FC crest device, registered trademark number 1387589 and the words "Arsenal Gunners", registered trademark number 1393203, which were registered in 1989. Matthew Reed had been selling football merchandise articles with the Arsenal FC marks from stalls near the Highbury Stadium for around 30 years. At the stalls were notices and disclaimers, stating that the products were not official. The few official products he had offered were specially labeled.

== High Court of Justice ==
Arsenal FC started proceedings in first instance against Reed in January 1999 at the High Court of Justice. They alleged that Reed infringed certain of their registered trademarks and had carried out committed acts of passing off. The High Court rejected the claim in the terms of passing off. It was mentioned by the High Court that the products sold by Reed were not noticed as an indication of origin by the customers, because of the disclaimer notices at the stalls. Arsenal FC could not prove that the customers were not able to differentiate between the original product and the ones sold by Reed. So there was no use of the marks as badges of origin which were causative for the claim of passing off. Additionally, it was held that the marks were only used as badges of allegiance and loyalty. In terms of the claim of trademark infringement it is relevant to make clear if any respective use of the sign is a trademark infringement or just the use as a mark. It was difficult to interpret whether this legal issue covered by the national law which is influenced by the First Council Directive 89/104 of December 21, 1988, to approximate the laws of the Member States relating to trade marks. To sort out that matter, the High Court referred the following questions to the European Court of Justice.

=== Referred Questions ===
1. Where a trade mark is validly registered and

(a) a third party uses in the course of trade a sign identical with that trade mark in relation to goods which are identical with those for which the trade mark is registered; and

(b) the third party has no defence to infringement by virtue of Article 6(1) of the Directive; does the third party have a defence to infringement on the ground that the use complained of does not indicate trade origin (i.e. a connection in the course of trade between the goods and the trade mark proprietor)?

2. If so, is the fact that the use in question would be perceived as a badge of support, loyalty or affiliation to the trade mark proprietor a sufficient connection?

=== Reason of decision ===
At first, the ECJ pointed out that Reed was using a sign in the course of trade which was identical with the trade mark registered by Arsenal FC. In this particular case, there is a trademark infringement. Beyond that the question had to be answered whether any use of the sign of a third party would entitle Arsenal FC to forbid this use. Or if there must be a specific interest by the owner of the registered trade mark. In this point, the ECJ made clear that Article 5 (1) (a) of the trade mark directive requires for its applicability a specific interest. Ensuing, the ECJ pointed out, that a specific interest is constituted by violation of an essential function. The owner of a registered trade mark could only prohibit the use of an identical sign if his interests regarding the essential function of the trade mark violated. The essential function of a registered trade mark is to identify the origin of the goods. So there is no danger of confusion by the customers. A use of an identical sign in a merely describing way would not violate the interest of the owner of the trade mark. The ECJ is convinced that the style of the products sold by Reed could lead to the impression in the course of trade, that there is a relationship between these products and Arsenal FC. Even the disclaimers at the stalls that the products sold by Reed are not official products of Arsenal FC, do not lead to another estimate. Following the opinion of the ECJ, most of all by the time the products left the stalls they can be regarded as official Products of the Arsenal FC by other customers. The interesting point here is that the arguments are identical with those, which lead to the rejection in the claim of passing off. Under this the decision about the claim of passing off maybe has to be reconsidered. But the ECJ did not say anything about this former ruling of the High Court and its arguments. Going back to the case, the ECJ assume to be convinced that the use of a sign which is identical with a registered trade mark is suitable to harm the guarantee of origin and therefore consequently the essential function of a registered trade mark. Consequently, in this particular case, there is a violation of the specific interests of the Arsenal FC by Reed. He used the sign in the meaning of Article 5 (1) of the trade mark directive. Therefore, there is a trade mark infringement by Reed selling products, not official wear by Arsenal FC, but carrying the sign of the Arsenal FC.

== Ruling of the court ==
For that reason, the European Court of Justice, in answer to the questions referred to it by the High Court of Justice of England and Wales, Chancery Division, by order of 4 May 2001, ruled: In a situation which is not covered by Article 6(1) of the First Council Directive 89/104/EEC of 21 December 1988 to approximate the laws of the Member States relating to trade marks, where a third party uses in the course of trade a sign which is identical to a validly registered trade mark on goods which are identical to those for which it is registered, the trade mark proprietor of the mark is entitled, in circumstances such as those in the present case, to rely on Article 5(1)(a) of that directive to prevent that use. It is immaterial that, in the context of that use, the sign is perceived as a badge of support for or loyalty or affiliation to the trade mark proprietor.

== Legal relevance ==
This decision has a special relevance for the trade mark law in view of the trade mark directive. It pointed out that the important requirements are the specific interests and as a consequence of that the essential function. For the applicability of the law, there has to be at first a specific interest by the owner of the registered trade mark. And therefore this special interest has to concern an essential function of the trade mark. In this case the ECJ pointed out that the essential function is the guarantee of origin. The consideration that there could be other essential functions is not far to seek obvious. If such interests exist and what they will be was left unanswered by European Court of Justice.

== Rejection of ECJ Ruling ==
When the case was remitted from the ECJ back to Laddie J, it was found that the ECJ had exceeded its jurisdiction and had made findings of fact, and contrary to the English Court's findings in the first judgment. Laddie J applied the ECJ's guidance on the principles of law and disregarding any conclusions reached on the facts. The case was decided in favour of Reed. Arsenal appealed.

== Appeal ==
The Court of Appeal allowed the appeal, and held that in so far as the ECJ had made findings of fact, the conclusions were not inconsistent with the findings of fact reached by the judge, and were inevitable in the circumstances. The ECJ had considered whether the third party's use affected or was likely to affect the essential function of the mark, and had found that Reed's use of the registered trade marks was liable to affect one of the functions of the registered mark.

At no stage had the ECJ suggested that use which was not understood by the public to be a designation of the origin, could not infringe. The judge had found that Reed's use of the marks did not indicate the origin of the goods but had failed to consider whether such use was liable to affect or jeopardise the guarantee of origin which was the essential feature of Arsenal's marks. Reed's use meant that the goods which did not originate from Arsenal were in free circulation. This affected the ability of Arsenal's marks to guarantee the origin of the goods.

It was also held that the use of the word 'Arsenal' on a scarf or other item of clothing could have three meanings:

a) the owner was a supporter of Arsenal

b) the goods came from Arsenal

c) a combination of the above two.

It was clear that the evidence showed that there were instances of confusion, albeit few, and that consumers seeing identical signs to Arsenal's registered marks, complained to Arsenal. If there was no such likelihood of confusion there would be no need for Reed to inform his customers expressly that the goods were not official. It was clear that the trademarks did designate origin.

Further, the judge's decision on passing off was doubted. Although, Aldous LJ's comments were obiter, the traditional form of passing off was said to be no longer definitive of the ambit of the cause of action which now was approximating to a law of 'unfair trading' or 'unfair competition'. To date (April 2007), there is little sign that Aldous LJ's comments have led to a wider tort of unfair competition within the UK.
