= Alan Hyman =

British author, journalist, and film writer (10 January 1910–1999)

- Born: 10 January 1910; England
- Died: 23 February 1999 (aged 89)
- Resting place: Brompton Cemetery, London, England
- Education: St Cyprian's School; Repton School
- Alma mater: Magdalene College, Cambridge
- Occupations: Author, journalist, and film writer
- Children: Miranda Miller; Timothy Hyman; Anthony Hyman; Nicholas Hyman

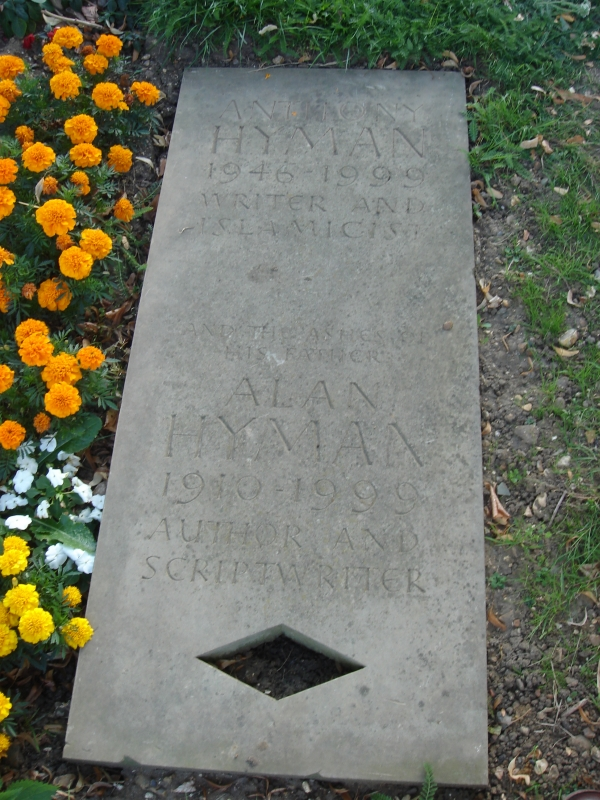
Funerary monument with his son Anthony Hyman at the Brompton Cemetery, London

Alan Maurice Hyman (10 January 1910 – 23 February 1999) was an English writer, journalist, and film writer.

== Life and work ==
Alan Hyman was the son of A. Hyman. He was educated at St Cyprian's School, Repton School, and Magdalene College, Cambridge. He became a journalist and worked on the staff of the Daily Sketch and Sunday Graphic from 1929 to 1932. Then he became a screenwriter and spent much of his life in the film industry.

At Gaumont, he worked for Michael Balcon and collaborated on the scripts of Sunshine Suzie and Falling in Love. Subsequently, he worked with Herbert Wilcox on Three Maxims and Victoria the Great and then with Thorold Dickinson as co-author of the script for the film The Arsenal Stadium Mystery in 1939. Later, he collaborated with Sydney Box on I Met a Murderer. During the Second World War, he was commissioned into the Royal Naval Volunteer Reserve and worked as a screenwriter.

Hyman wrote scripts for BBC radio, including for the programme Spotlight on a Tunesmith, compered by Ben Lyon, and Pioneers of Jazz. He joined Shell International in 1952, writing and producing scripts for their Visual Aids Unit. From 1954 to 1958, he was a member of the Council of the Screenwriters' Association and was on the film panel that selected the best British film scripts each year. He continued in journalism and became an expert on Sullivan's light operas and on Victorian burlesque theatre. He described this in The Gaiety Years a book about Gaiety Girls. He also wrote an important work on Horatio Bottomley, the swindler.

Hyman had four children, the author Miranda Miller, the artist Timothy Hyman, the Afghan scholar Anthony Hyman and Nicholas Hyman.

== Filmography ==
- Sunshine Suzie
- Falling in Love (1935) (story) ... aka Trouble Ahead (USA) starring Charles Farrell and Gregory Ratoff
- Three Maxims (1936)
- Victoria the Great (1937)
- The Arsenal Stadium Mystery (1939) (adaptation)
- I Met a Murderer

== Bibliography ==
- The Rise & Fall of Horatio Bottomley: The biography of a swindler, Cassell, 1972. ISBN 0-304-29023-8
- The Gaiety Years, Cassell, 1975. ISBN 0-304-29372-5
- Sullivan and his Satellites: A survey of English operettas 1860–1914, Elm Tree Books, 1978. ISBN 0-903443-24-4

== Sources ==
- Repton School Register
- Dustjacket notes to "The Gaiety Years"
