= Timothy Hyman =

English painter (1946–2024)

Timothy Hyman RA
- Born: 17 April 1946; Hove, Sussex, England
- Died: 7 September 2024 (aged 78)
- Education: Slade School of Fine Art
- Occupation: Author
- Father: Alan Hyman
- Relatives: Miranda Miller (sister); Anthony Hyman (brother)

Timothy Hyman RA (17 April 1946 – 7 September 2024) was a British figurative painter, art writer and curator. He published monographs on both Sienese Painting and on Pierre Bonnard, as well as most recently The World New Made: Figurative Painting in the Twentieth Century. He wrote extensively on art and film, was a regular contributor to The Times Literary Supplement (TLS) and curated exhibitions at the Tate, Institute of Contemporary Arts and Hayward galleries. Hyman was a portraitist but is best known for his narrative renditions of London. Drawing inspiration from artists such as Max Beckmann and Bonnard, as well as Lorenzetti and Brueghel, he explored his personal relationship, both real and mythological, with the city where he lived and worked. He employed vivid colours, shifting scale and perspectives, to create visionary works. He was elected an RA in 2011.

== Life and career ==
Hyman was born in Hove, Sussex, in 1946, and was brought up in London. He attended the Slade School of Fine Art between 1963 and 1967. Since 1980, he had ten London solo exhibitions. His earliest publications were on film (8½ as an Anatomy of Melancholy, Sight and Sound, 1974) and on literature (The Modus Vivendi of John Cowper Powys, 1972). He began to publish articles on painting in the mid-seventies in The London Magazine, and was a contributing editor to Artscribe. In 1979, he curated the controversial exhibition Narrative Paintings at the ICA in London and the Arnolfini in Bristol. In 1980 and 1982, he was a Visiting Professor in Baroda, (Vadodara) India, and completed several extensive British Council lecture tours. Hyman was Artist-in-Residence at Lincoln Cathedral, Sandown Racecourse and, most recently, at Maggie's Cancer Caring Centres (exhibited at the Royal Academy in 2015). Since 1982, he had been married to the author Judith Ravenscroft. He lived in North London. He died on 7 September 2024.

Hyman wrote on the work of many artists including Pierre Bonnard and the painters of the Sienese School as well as more contemporary artists, such as Howard Hodgkin R. B. Kitaj and the Indian painter Bhupen Khakhar From 1990, he was a regular contributor to The Times Literary Supplement and wrote on a variety of subjects including: Ernst Ludwig Kirchner Henry Darger and German Romanticism. Hyman also wrote extensively on film, including articles on Fellini, Andrei Tarkovsky and Derek Jarman. In 1998, Hyman's monograph on Bonnard (judged by The New Criterion as "by far the best thing ever written about the painter") was published by Thames & Hudson, and, in the same year, his book on Bhupen Khakhar was published in India. In 2003 his widely admired monograph Sienese Painting (Thames & Hudson), centred on Ambrogio Lorenzetti and other artists of the fourteenth and fifteenth century, was described in the TLS by David Ekserdjian as "an unimprovable union of exceptionally acute looking, magical prose, and authoritative scholarship". In 2016, Thames & Hudson published The World New Made: Figurative Painting in the Twentieth Century, described by Svetlana Alpers as "exhilarating to read"; and by Christopher Allen as "a delight, deeply but lightly erudite, intimate, written with exquisite intelligence."

Hyman and Roger Malbert curated the Hayward Gallery touring exhibition Carnivalesque in 2000.

In 2001, along with the cultural historian Patrick Wright, Hyman was lead curator for the acclaimed Stanley Spencer retrospective at Tate Britain. He also co-curated the major exhibition British Vision at the Museum of Fine Arts, Ghent, in 2007–2008.

Hyman was also well known for his lectures that investigate the tangents and marginalia of art history. He was a visiting lecturer in art at the Slade School of Fine Art, Glasgow School of Art, Central Saint Martins and the Royal College of Art for many years, as well as lecturing at the Working Men's College, the Tate, the National Gallery, London, and the Museum of Modern Art in New York.

Hyman died on 7 September 2024, at the age of 78.

== Exhibitions ==
- 1979: Narrative Paintings. Institute of Contemporary Art, London & Arnolfini, Bristol.
- 1981/83/85: Blond Fine Art, London
- 1982/83/86/88: Whitechapel Open, London.
- 1984: A Singular Vision. South London Art Gallery, London.
- 1985: Human Interest. Cornerhouse, Manchester.
- 1986: Self Portrait. Bath Festival and touring.
- 1988: The Subjective City. Barbican Art Gallery, London.
- 1991: EASTinternational, Norwich.
- 1993: Castlefield Gallery Manchester
- 1994: Chemould, Bombay, India
- 1997: Contemporary British Figurative Painting. Flowers East, London.
- 2000: Mid River: Paintings and Drawings of a Decade, Austin/Desmond Fine Art, London
- 2006: The Man Inscribed with London, curated by Nurit David, Gallery of the Artists' Studios, Tel Aviv
- 2009: The Man Inscribed with London, Austin/Desmond Fine Art, London
- 2015: A Year with Maggie's, Royal Academy of Arts, London
- 2018: Overlapping Circuits, collaborative mural with Luci Eyers, Transition Gallery, London
- 2019: Tree of Lives, collaborative mural with Perienne Christian and Luci Eyers, BAGT Studios, London

== Awards and prizes ==
- 1984–85: Artist-in-Residence, Westfield College London
- 1992: Artist-in-Residence, Sandown Racecourse
- 1992: Leverhulme Award
- 1993: Honorary Research Fellow, University College London
- 1995: Rootstein/Hopkins Award
- 1998: Wingate Foundation Award
- 2007: BP Travel Award (National Portrait Gallery, London)
- 2018: Awarded grant from Royal Literary Fund

== Publications (selected) ==
- Bonnard, Thames & Hudson, 1998 ISBN 978-0-500-20310-1
- Bhupen Khakhar, Chemould Publications and Mapin Publishing, 1998, ISBN 81-85822-55-7
- Carnivalesque Timothy Hyman, Roger Malbert & Malcolm Jones. Published by National Touring Exhibitions (Hayward Gallery); and University of California Press.2001 ISBN 978-1-85332-209-9
- Stanley Spencer Tate Publishing. London. 2001. ISBN 978-1-85437-377-9
- Sienese Painting, Thames & Hudson, 2003. ISBN 0-500-20372-5.
- Fifty Drawings, Lenz Books. 2010. ISBN 978-0-9564760-4-3.
- A Year with Maggie's, Royal Academy of Arts 2015, ISBN 978-1-907533-96-9
- The World New Made: Figurative Painting in the Twentieth Century, Thames & Hudson, 2016. ISBN 978-0-500-23945-2
