= The Arsenal Stadium Mystery =

1939 British film by Thorold Dickinson

- Arsenal manager George Allison gives a tactical team-talk to his players
- Directed by: Thorold Dickinson
- Written by: Thorold Dickinson; Donald Bull; Patrick Kirwan; Alan Hyman
- Based on: The Arsenal Stadium Mystery by Leonard Gribble.
- Produced by: Josef Somlo
- Starring: Leslie Banks; Greta Gynt; Ian McLean; Liane Linden; Anthony Bushell; Esmond Knight
- Cinematography: Desmond Dickinson
- Edited by: Sidney Stone
- Music by: Miklós Rózsa
- Production companies: Greenspan & Seligman (G&S Films); Denham Studios
- Distributed by: General Film Distributors
- Release date: November 1939
- Running time: 84 minutes
- Country: United Kingdom
- Language: English

The Arsenal Stadium Mystery is a 1939 British mystery film directed by Thorold Dickinson and starring Leslie Banks and Greta Gynt. It was written by Dickinson, Donald Bull, Patrick Kirwan and Alan Hyman, adapted from the 1939 novel of the same title by Leonard Gribble.

== Plot ==
The film is a murder mystery set at the original Arsenal Stadium, Gillespie Road, Highbury, London, the then home of Arsenal Football Club, one of the dominant teams in English football. The backdrop is a friendly match between Arsenal and The Trojans, a fictitious amateur side. One of the Trojans' players drops dead during the match and when it is revealed he has been poisoned, suspicion falls on his teammates as well as his former mistress. Detective Inspector Slade is called in to solve the crime.

The victim has been poisoned by a powerful digitalis-based chemical. There is evidence that he was being blackmailed.

The investigation gets complicated when the girlfriend (a prime suspect) is also murdered by the same method.

The police set a trap by putting a chemical on top of the poison, which turns the skin black after a few hours. The player responsible is then spotted whilst playing.

== Cast ==
- Leslie Banks as Insp. Anthony Slade
- Greta Gynt as Gwen Lee
- Ian McLean as Sgt. Clinton
- Liane Linden as Inga Larson
- Anthony Bushell as John Doyce
- Esmond Knight as George Raille
- Brian Worth as Phillip Morring
- Richard Norris as Richard Setchley
- Wyndham Goldie as Francis Kindilett
- Alastair Macintyre as Carter
- E. V. H. Emmett as himself
- George Allison as himself

== Production ==
The film was shot at Denham Film Studios and on location at the original Arsenal Stadium in Highbury.

The film stars several Arsenal players and members of staff such as Cliff Bastin and Eddie Hapgood, although only manager George Allison has a speaking part. The Trojans' body doubles on the pitch were players from Brentford, filmed during the First Division fixture between the two sides on 6 May 1939; this was the last match of the 1938–39 season and Arsenal's last official league fixture before the outbreak of the Second World War. Brentford's players wore white shirts for the match because their first choice red and white stripes would have clashed with Arsenal's red and white jerseys. The Trojans' players therefore wore similar white shirts in close up sequences which were then cut in with the match action.

Dickinson planned a follow-up, The Denham Studio Mystery, which was intended to incorporate footage from the aborted film I Claudius, but this fell through.

== Reception ==
The Monthly Film Bulletin wrote: "The Director of this ingenious story has wisely taken full advantage of his unusual accessories. The plot is complicated, and not always easy to follow, but this is readily overlooked in the excitement of really well-staged football sequences, and the presence on the screen of a famous team and its Manager and Trainer, with commentary by E. V. H. Emmett put over in characteristic fashion. There are other incidents, and thrills in abundance, and in addition Leslie Banks gives a most entertaining performance as a police inspector with an exuberant sense of humour and a discerning taste in hats. With such competition it speaks volumes for his acting that whenever he is on the screen he dominates the scene. The remainder of the cast supports him loyally. The background of the Stadium is most effectively and convincingly reproduced."

Kine Weekly wrote: "The drama opens and closes with easily the best football seen on the screen. The Arsenal Stadium is, of course, the venue, and so realistic is the play and impressive the crowd shots that these sequences have, amongst other things, a nostalgic value. The committing of the basic crime and its elucidation also have ingenuity and invention. Few will twig the actual murderer until the final whistle goes. And sporting and crime thrills are not all. There is the humour of Leslie Banks' character to give contrast and contribute to fluid and fascinating continuity. A visit to the Arsenal Stadium and an outstanding comedy thriller in one, a film with the widest possible appeal."

== See also ==
- List of association football films
