= Tank: The Progress of a Monstrous War Machine =

2002 book about tanks by Patrick Wright

- Author: Patrick Wright
- Publisher: Viking Press
- Publication date: 2002
- ISBN: 0-670-03070-8

Tank: The Progress of a Monstrous War Machine is a comprehensive history of the tank and its uses throughout the 20th century by historian Patrick Wright.
