= Leonard Gribble =

British crime writer (1908–1985)

Leonard Reginald Gribble
- Born: 1 February 1908; South Lambeth London, U.K.
- Died: 27 September 1985 (aged 77); Worthing, Sussex
- Occupation: Novelist
- Writing career
- Pen name: Leo Grex, Sterry Browning, Louis Grey, Dexter Muir, Landon Grant, Piers Marlowe, Bruce Sanders
- Language: English
- Notable work: The Arsenal Stadium Mystery
- Website: petersfraserdunlop.com/clients/leonard-gribble/

Leonard Reginald Gribble (1 February 1908 – 27 September 1985) was a prolific writer from Devon. His novels often focussed on the particulars of policing and the judicial system. Gribble also wrote under the pseudonyms Sterry Browning, Leo Grex, Louis Grey, Piers Marlow, Dexter Muir and Bruce Sanders; he also wrote some Westerns, under the name Landon Grant.

Gribble was one of the founding members of the Crime Writers' Association in 1953.

== Bibliography ==
=== As Leonard Gribble ===
==== Inspector/Superintendent Anthony Slade series ====
- The Case of the Marsden Rubies (1929)
- The Gillespie Suicide Mystery (1929)
- The Grand Modena Murder (1930)
- Is this Revenge (1931) aka The Serpentine Murder (Dodd Mead 1932)
- The Stolen Home Secretary (1932) aka The Stolen Statesman
- Queens of Crime (Hurst & Blackett 1932)
- The Secret of Tangles (1933) (Cherry Tree 1939)
- The Yellow Bungalow (1933)
- The Riddle of the Ravens (1934)
- Mystery at Tudor Arches (1935)
- The Case of the Malverne Diamonds (1936)
- Riley of the Special Branch (1936)
- Who Killed Oliver Cromwell? (1937)
- The Case Book of Anthony Slade (1937)
- Tragedy in E Flat (1938)
- The Arsenal Stadium Mystery (Harrap 1939) (filmed in 1939)
- Atomic Murder (Harrap 1947)
- Hangman’s Moon (1950)
- The Frightened Chameleon (1950)
- The Glass Alibi (1952)
- Murder Out of Season (1952)
- She Died Laughing (1953)
- The Inverted Crime (1954)
- Death Pays the Piper (Herbert Jenkins 1956)
- Superintendent Slade Investigates (1956)
- Stand In for Murder (1957)
- Don’t Argue with Death (1959)
- Wantons Die Hard (Herbert Jenkins 1961)
- Heads You Die (1964)
- The Violent Dark (1965)
- Strip Tease Macabre (1967)
- A Diplomat Dies (1969)
- Alias the Victim (1971)

==== Others ====
- Famous Feats of Detection and Deduction (Harrap 1933)
- The Death Chime (1934)
- Heroes of the Fighting RAF (Harrap 1941)
- Epics of the Fighting RAF (Harrap 1943)
- Heroes of the Merchant Navy (Harrap 1944)
- Transatlantic Trouble (Cherry Tree 1946)
- On Secret Service (Burke ?1947)
- The Secret of the Red Mill (Burke 1948)
- They Kidnapped Stanley Matthews (Herbert Jenkins 1950)
- The Missing Speed Ace (Burke 1950)
- Mystery Manor (1951)
- Speed Dermot (Burke 1951)
- The Bedside Marion Cran (Herbert Jenkins 1951)(with Marion Cran)
- The Velvet Mask (1952)
- Murder Mistaken (1953) with Janet Green
- Sally of Scotland Yard (1954) with Geraldine Laws
- Famous Manhunts (John Long ?1954)
- Triumphs of Scotland Yard (John Long 1955)
- Fifty Famous Animal Stories (ed)(Burke 1958)
- Murders Most Strange (John Long 1959)
- Stories for Boys (1961)
- Clues that Spelled Guilty (John Long 1961)
- When Killers Err (John Long 1962)
- The True Book About Great Escapes (Muller 1962)
- Famous Stories of High Adventure (Barker 1962)
- They Challenged the Yard (John Long 1963)
- Stories of Famous Detectives (Barker 1963)(Four Square 1966)
- Stories of Famous Spies (Barker 1964)
- Such Women Are Deadly (Arco NY 1965)
- Great Manhunters of the Yard (John Long 1966)
- Famous Stories of the Wild West (Target 1967)
- They Had a Way with Women (Arrow 1968)
- Fifty Famous Stories for Boys (Burke 1969)
- Strange Crimes of Passion (1970)
- More Famous Historical Mysteries (Muller 1972)
- Programmed for Death (1973)
- Famous Historical Mysteries (Target 1974)
- You Can’t Die Tomorrow (1975)
- Midsummer Slay Ride (1976)
- Famous Mysteries of Modern Times (Muller 1976)
- Crime on Her Hands (1977)
- Compelled to Kill (John Long 1977)
- They Came to Kill (John Long 1978)
- The Dead End Killers (John Long 1978)
- Death Needs No Alibi (1979)
- Dead End in Mayfair (1981)
- The Dead Don’t Scream (1983)
- Notorious Killers in the Night (Robert Hale 1983)
- Such Lethal Ladies (Robert Hale 1985)

=== As Leo Grex ===
==== Paul Irving series ====
- The Tragedy at Draythorpe (Hutchinson 1931)
- The Lonely Inn Mystery (1933)
- The Madison Murder (Hutchinson 1933)
- The Man from Manhattan (Hutchinson 1934)(Doubleday 1935)
- Murder in the Sanctuary (1934)
- Stolen Death (Hutchinson 1936)
- The Carlent Manor Crime (1939)
- Ace of Danger (Hutchinson 1952)

==== Phil Sanderson series ====
- Violent Keepsake (John Long 1967)
- The Hard Kill (John Long 1969)

==== Others ====
- The Nightborn (1931)
- Crooner’s Swan Song (1935)
- Transatlantic Trouble (1937)
- The Black Out Murders (Harrap 1940)
- The Stalag Mites (Harrap 1947)
- King Spiv (1948)
- Crooked Sixpence (Harrap 1949)
- Thanks for the Felony (John Long 1958)
- Larceny in Her Heart (John Long 1959)
- Terror Wears a Smile (John Long 1962)
- The Brass Knuckle (John Long 1964)
- Kill Now Pay Later (John Long 1971)
- Die as in Murder (1974)
- Murder Stranger than Fiction (Robert Hale 1975)
- Death Throws No Shadow (Robert Hale 1976)
- Detection Stranger than Fiction (Robert Hale 1977)
- Mix Me a Murder (Robert Hale 1978)
- Mystery Stranger than Fiction (Robert Hale 1979)(St Martin's Press 1979)
- These Crimes Made Headlines (Robert Hale 1980)
- Hot Ice (Robert Hale 1983)

=== As Louis Grey ===
- The Signet of Death (1934)

(reprinted Herbert Jenkins 1946 as by Dexter Muir)

=== As Dexter Muir ===
- The Pilgrims Meet Murder (Herbert Jenkins 1948)
- The Speckled Swan (Herbert Jenkins 1949)
- Rosemary for Death (Herbert Jenkins 1952)

=== As Sterry Browning ===
- Coastal Commandos (Nicholson & Watson 1946)(Digit 1953)
- Crime at Cape Folly (Clerke & Cockeran 1951)
- Santa Fe Gunslick (Clerke & Cockeran 1951)(Pearson's Western ?1950)
- Sex Marks the Spot (1954)
