= Miranda Miller (novelist) =

English novelist (born 1950)

- Born: 23 September 1950 (age 76); London, England
- Education: King's College London
- Occupation: Author
- Father: Alan Hyman
- Relatives: Timothy Hyman (brother); Anthony Hyman (brother)

Miranda Miller (born 23 September 1950) is an English novelist who has also published short stories and a book of interviews with homeless women and politicians.

== Biography ==
She was born in London, England, the daughter of Alan Hyman; she is the youngest of four children (including the artist Timothy Hyman and Afghan scholar Anthony Hyman). She was educated at St Christopher's School, Hampstead, Queen's College, London, and PNEU School, Queen's Gardens, before starting a History degree at King's College London. After a year, she moved to Rome, Italy, where she wrote her first novel. She has also lived in Libya, Saudi Arabia and Japan.

From 1979 to 1999, she was married to the artist and teacher Dr Michael Miller and has one daughter, Rebecca, born in 1981. She is now married to the musician Gordon St John Clarke and they live in North London.

== List of works ==
- Under the Rainbow: Hutchinson, 1978 (published under the name Miranda Hyman)
- Family: Hutchinson, 1979
- Before Natasha: Love Stories, 1985
- Smiles and the Millennium: Virago, 1987
- A Thousand and One Coffee Mornings: Scenes from Saudi Arabia: Peter Owen, 1989
- Bed and Breakfast: Women and Homelessness Today, The Women's Press, 1990
- Loving Mephistopheles: Peter Owen, 2007
- Nina in Utopia, Part 1 of The Bedlam Trilogy: Peter Owen, 2010
- The Fairy Visions of Richard Dadd, Part 2 of The Bedlam Trilogy: Peter Owen, 2013
- Angelica, Paintress of Minds: 2020, Barbican Press
- When I Was: 2025, Barbican Press

== Awards ==
- 1989: K Blundell Award from the Society of Authors
- 2013–15: Royal Literary Fund Fellowship at the Courtauld Institute
