= The Arsenal Stadium Mystery (novel) =

1939 novel by Leonard Gribble

- First edition
- Author: Leonard Gribble
- Series: Inspector Anthony Slade
- Genre: Mystery
- Publisher: George G. Harrap and Co.
- Publication date: 1939

The Arsenal Stadium Mystery is a novel by Leonard Gribble. It was first published by George G. Harrap and Co. in 1939.

It was later turned into a film of the same name, directed by Thorold Dickinson.
